= 2013 end-of-year rugby union internationals =

Test match series

The 2013 end of year rugby tests, also known as the 2013 Autumn internationals in the Northern Hemisphere, were a series of international rugby union matches predominantly played between European sides - England, France, Ireland, Italy, Scotland and Wales, and visiting Southern Hemisphere countries - Argentina, Australia, Fiji, New Zealand, Samoa, South Africa and Tonga.

In 2013, a record 39 test matches took place, with a record 24 matches including a tier 2 or tier 3 side, six of which being a tier 1 v tier 2 fixture, as the IRB builds up to the 2015 Rugby World Cup.

Australia made their first tour of the Home Nations since 2009. However, they could not achieve a first Grand Slam since 1984 following their 20–13 defeat to England in the opening week of their tour. In addition, Australia played Italy in Turin for the first time. World cup winners New Zealand played France - for the fourth time in 2013, England and Ireland. South Africa played Wales, Scotland and France while Argentina played England, Wales and Italy.

Three invitational teams were in action against international teams during November. The Māori All Blacks visited Canada and the United States, while the French Barbarians faced Samoa. The Barbarians and Fiji contested the Killik Cup, which marked 100 years of rugby in Fiji.

As in other recent seasons, New Zealand and Australia played the third Bledisloe Cup match.

== Test matches ==
=== Bledisloe Cup – 3rd test ===
19 October 2013
19:35 NZST (UTC+12)

New Zealand	41–33	Australia
Try: Savea 9' c Cane 29' c Cruden 36' c Read 53' m Con: Cruden (3/4) 10', 30', 37'; Pen: Cruden (4/6) 18', 22', 34', 43'; Barrett (1/1) 69'	Report	Try: Ashley-Cooper 39' c To'omua 47' c Kuridrani 76' c Con: Cooper (3/3) 40', 48', 77'; Pen: Cooper (3/3) 3', 24', 32; Drop: Cooper 15'

Forsyth Barr Stadium, Dunedin
Attendance: 28,973
Referee: Craig Joubert (South Africa)

Team details

FB	15	Israel Dagg
RW	14	Charles Piutau
OC	13	Ben Smith	(substituted off) 72'
IC	12	Ma'a Nonu
LW	11	Julian Savea
FH	10	Aaron Cruden	(substituted off) 59'
SH	9	Aaron Smith	(substituted off) 67'
N8	8	Kieran Read (c)
OF	7	Sam Cane
BF	6	Liam Messam	(substituted off) 72'
RL	5	Sam Whitelock
LL	4	Jeremy Thrush	(substituted off) 43'
TP	3	Charlie Faumuina	(substituted off) 67'
HK	2	Keven Mealamu	(substituted off) 59'
LP	1	Tony Woodcock	(substituted off) 67'
Replacements:
HK	16	Dane Coles	(substituted on) 59'
PR	17	Wyatt Crockett	(substituted on) 67'
PR	18	Ben Franks	(substituted on) 67'
LK	19	Brodie Retallick	(substituted on) 43'
FL	20	Steve Luatua	(substituted on) 72'
SH	21	Tawera Kerr-Barlow	(substituted on) 67'
FH	22	Beauden Barrett	(substituted on) 59'
FH	23	Tom Taylor	(substituted on) 72'
Coach:
(New Zealand) Steve Hansen

FB	15	Israel Folau
RW	14	Adam Ashley-Cooper
OC	13	Tevita Kuridrani
IC	12	Matt To'omua
LW	11	Peter Betham	(substituted off) 67'
FH	10	Quade Cooper
SH	9	Will Genia
N8	8	Ben McCalman	(substituted off) 67'
OF	7	Michael Hooper
BF	6	Ben Mowen
RL	5	James Horwill (c)	(substituted off) 64'
LL	4	Rob Simmons
TP	3	Ben Alexander	(substituted off) 48'
HK	2	Stephen Moore	(substituted off) 59'
LP	1	James Slipper	(substituted off) 61'
Replacements:
HK	16	Saia Fainga'a	(substituted on) 59'
PR	17	Benn Robinson	(substituted on) 48'
PR	18	Sekope Kepu	(substituted on) 61'
LK	19	Sitaleki Timani	(substituted on) 64'
FL	20	Dave Dennis	(substituted on) 67'
SH	21	Nic White
CE	22	Mike Harris
FB	23	Bernard Foley	(substituted on) 67'
Coach:
(Australia) Ewen McKenzie

Touch judges:
Jaco Peyper (South Africa)
Stuart Berry (South Africa)
Television match official:
Vinny Munro (New Zealand)

Notes:

- Australia's 33 points was the highest ever score by a visiting team against New Zealand.
- Will Genia became just the third Australian scrum-half and the 39th Wallaby to reach 50 caps.
- Peter Betham made his international debut for Australia.

=== 2–3 November ===
2 November 2013
14:00 JST (UTC+9)

Japan	6–54	New Zealand
Pen: Goromaru (2/2) 13', 22'	Report	Try: Piutau (2) 9' c, 74' c Cane 26' c B. Smith 29' c McCaw 31' c Thrush 50' c Halai 57 m Barrett 67' c Con: Carter (5/5) 10', 27', 29', 33', 51'; Barrett (2/3) 68', 75'

Chichibunomiya Rugby Stadium, Tokyo
Attendance: 20,454
Referee: Stuart Berry (South Africa)

Team details

FB	15	Ayumu Goromaru
RW	14	Toshiaki Hirose (c)	(substituted off) 59'
OC	13	Male Sa'u
IC	12	Craig Wing	(substituted off) 76'
LW	11	Kenki Fukuoka
FH	10	Harumichi Tatekawa	(substituted off) 28'
SH	9	Fumiaki Tanaka
N8	8	Koliniasi Holani	(substituted off) 40'
OF	7	Michael Broadhurst
BF	6	Hendrik Tui
RL	5	Hitoshi Ono
LL	4	Shoji Ito	(substituted off) 65'
TP	3	Kensuke Hatakeyama	(substituted off) 56'
HK	2	Shota Horie	(substituted off) 76'
LP	1	Masataka Mikami	(substituted off) 76'
Replacements:
HK	16	Yusuke Aoki	(substituted on) 76'
PR	17	Yusuke Nagae	(substituted on) 76'
PR	18	Hiroshi Yamashita	(substituted on) 56'
LK	19	Luke Thompson	(substituted on) 65'
N8	20	Takashi Kikutani	(substituted on) 40'
FH	21	Kosei Ono	(substituted on) 76'
FH	22	Yuu Tamura	(substituted on) 28'
WG	23	Yoshikazu Fujita	(substituted on) 59'
Coach:
(Australia) Scott Wisemantel

FB	15	Beauden Barrett
RW	14	Charles Piutau
OC	13	Ben Smith		(substituted off) 50'
IC	12	Francis Saili
LW	11	Frank Halai
FH	10	Dan Carter		(substituted off) 50'
SH	9	Tawera Kerr-Barlow		(substituted off) 68'
N8	8	Richie McCaw (c)
OF	7	Sam Cane	(yellow card) 80+1' to 80'
BF	6	Steve Luatua
RL	5	Dominic Bird		(substituted off) 61'
LL	4	Jeremy Thrush
TP	3	Ben Franks
HK	2	Dane Coles		(substituted off) 64'
LP	1	Wyatt Crockett		(substituted off) 68'
Replacements:
HK	16	Andrew Hore		(substituted on) 64'
PR	17	Jeffery Toomaga-Allen		(substituted on) 68'
PR	18	Charlie Faumuina
LK	19	Brodie Retallick
FL	20	Luke Whitelock		(substituted on) 61'
SH	21	Aaron Smith		(substituted on) 68'
FH	22	Tom Taylor		(substituted on) 50'
CE	23	Ryan Crotty		(substituted on) 50'
Coach:
(New Zealand) Steve Hansen

Touch judges:
Angus Gardner (Australia)
Andrew Lees (Australia)
Television match official:
Matt Goddard (Australia)

Notes:

- Dominic Bird, Frank Halai, Jeffery Toomaga-Allen and Luke Whitelock made their international debuts for New Zealand.
- This was the first test between the two teams to be played in Japan and outside the Rugby World Cup.

2 November 2013
14:30 GMT (UTC+0)

England	20–13	Australia
Try: Robshaw 50' c Farrell 58' c Con: Farrell (2/2) 31', 57'; Pen: Farrell (2/5) 3', 28',	Report	Try: To'omua 31' c Con: Cooper (1/1) 31'; Pen: Cooper (2/4) 9', 34'

Twickenham, London
Attendance: 80,691
Referee: George Clancy (Ireland)

Team details

FB	15	Mike Brown
RW	14	Chris Ashton
OC	13	Joel Tomkins
IC	12	Billy Twelvetrees	(substituted off) 66'
LW	11	Marland Yarde
FH	10	Owen Farrell
SH	9	Lee Dickson	(substituted off) 55'
N8	8	Billy Vunipola	(substituted off) 66'
OF	7	Chris Robshaw (c)
BF	6	Tom Wood
RL	5	Courtney Lawes
LL	4	Joe Launchbury	(substituted off) 75'
TP	3	Dan Cole	(substituted off) 66'
HK	2	Tom Youngs	(substituted off) 54'
LP	1	Mako Vunipola	(substituted off) 54'
Replacements:
HK	16	Dylan Hartley	(substituted on) 54'
PR	17	Joe Marler	(substituted on) 54'
PR	18	David Wilson	(substituted on) 66'
LK	19	Dave Attwood	(substituted on) 75'
N8	20	Ben Morgan	(substituted on) 66'
SH	21	Ben Youngs	(substituted on) 55'
FH	22	Toby Flood	(substituted on) 66'
FB	23	Ben Foden
Coach:
(England) Stuart Lancaster

FB	15	Israel Folau
RW	14	Adam Ashley-Cooper	49' to 54'
OC	13	Tevita Kuridrani
IC	12	Matt To'omua
LW	11	Nick Cummins
FH	10	Quade Cooper
SH	9	Will Genia	(substituted off) 66'
N8	8	Ben Mowen (c)
OF	7	Michael Hooper
BF	6	Scott Fardy	(substituted off) 49'
RL	5	James Horwill
LL	4	Sitaleki Timani	(substituted off) 62'
TP	3	Ben Alexander	(substituted off) 49'
HK	2	Stephen Moore	(substituted off) 68'
LP	1	James Slipper	(substituted off) 61'
Replacements:
HK	16	Saia Fainga'a	(substituted on) 68'
PR	17	Benn Robinson	(substituted on) 61'
PR	18	Sekope Kepu	(substituted on) 49'
LK	19	Kane Douglas	(substituted on) 62'
FL	20	Ben McCalman	(substituted on) 49'
SH	21	Nic White	(substituted on) 66'
CE	22	Christian Lealiifano
FB	23	Bernard Foley	(substituted on) 49'	(substituted off) 54'
Coach:
(Australia) Ewen McKenzie

Man of the Match:
Mike Brown (England)

Touch judges:
Romain Poite (France)
Dudley Phillips (Ireland)
Television match official:
Marshall Kilgore (Ireland)

Notes:

- England reclaimed the Cook Cup.
- Joel Tomkins made his international debut for England.

2 November 2013
18:30 CET (UTC+1)

Belgium	26–10	Tunisia
Try: Penalty try 16' c K. Williams 39' c Hendrickx 43' c Torfs 71' m Con: A. Williams (3/4) 17', 40', 45'	Report (In French)	Try: Penalty try 22' c Con: Khalifa 22'; Pen: Khalifa (1/4) 19'

Stade Leburton, Tubize
Referee: Vlad Iordachescu (Romania)

3 November 2013
13:00 EDT (UTC-4)

Canada	15–40	Māori All Blacks
Try: Hassler 5' m Carpenter 59' c Con: Underwood (1/2) 60'; Pen: Underwood (1/2) 55'	Report	Try: Guildford 14' m Gibson-Park (2) 30' c, 50' c Robinson 35' c Proctor 69' c Barrett 75' c Con: Taylor (2/3) 31', 37'; Robinson (2/2) 51', 70'; West (1/1) 76'

BMO Field, Toronto
Attendance: 22,566
Referee: Federico Anselmi (Argentina)

Team details

FB	15	Matt Evans
RW	14	Jeff Hassler
OC	13	Ciaran Hearn	(substituted off) 40'
IC	12	Harry Jones
LW	11	Conor Trainor
FH	10	Liam Underwood	(substituted off) 67'
SH	9	Phil Mack	(substituted off) 52'
N8	8	Aaron Carpenter (c)
OF	7	John Moonlight
BF	6	Nanyak Dala	(substituted off) 38'
RL	5	Tyler Ardron
LL	4	Jon Phelan	(substituted off) 68'
TP	3	Doug Wooldridge	(substituted off) 64'
HK	2	Ray Barkwill	(substituted off) 74'
LP	1	Hubert Buydens
Replacements:
PR	16	Jake Illnicki	(substituted on) 64'
PR	17	Ryan March
LK	18	Aaron Flagg	(substituted on) 68'
FL	19	Kyle Gilmour	(substituted on) 74'
FL	20	Adam Kleeberger	(substituted on) 38'
SH	21	Jamie Mackenzie	(substituted on) 52'
CE	22	Pat Parfrey	(substituted on) 67'
FH	23	Connor Braid	(substituted on) 40'
Coach:
(New Zealand) Kieran Crowley

FB	15	Robbie Robinson	(substituted off) 72'
RW	14	Andre Taylor
OC	13	Charlie Ngatai
IC	12	Jackson Willison	(substituted off) 72'
LW	11	Zac Guildford	(substituted off) 64'
FH	10	Tim Bateman (c)
SH	9	Jamison Gibson-Park
N8	8	Elliot Dixon
OF	7	Luke Braid	(substituted off) 53'
BF	6	Liam Squire
RL	5	Joe Wheeler	(substituted off) 66'
LL	4	Jarrad Hoeata
TP	3	Ben Afeaki	(substituted off) 70'
HK	2	Hika Elliot	(substituted off) 22'
LP	1	Kane Hames	(substituted off) 66'
Replacements:
PR	16	Chris Eves	(substituted on) 66'
PR	17	Nick Barrett	(substituted on) 70'
HK	18	Ash Dixon	(substituted on) 22'
N8	19	Blade Thomson	(substituted on) 66'
FL	20	Shane Christie	(substituted on) 53'
FB	21	Kurt Baker	(substituted on) 72'
FH	22	Ihaia West	(substituted on) 72'
WG	23	Matt Proctor	(substituted on) 64'
Coach:
(New Zealand) Colin Cooper

Man of the Match:
Zac Guildford (Māori All Blacks)

Touch judges:
USA Appt (United States)
USA Appt (United States)
Television match official:
USA Appt (United States)

=== 8–10 November ===
8 November 2013
19:00 CET (UTC+1)

Senegal	33–10	Ivory Coast
Try: Sargos 8' c Folliot 29' c Penalty try 76' c Con: Folliot (3/3) 8', 30', 76'; Pen: Folliot (4/4) 22', 40', 60'	Report	Try: Coulibaly 30' c Con: Lo (1/1) 31'; Pen: Lo (1/3) 19'

Stade Pierre-Antoine, Castres, France
Attendance: 700
Referee: Cédric Marchat (France)

9 November 2013
16:30 GET (UTC+4)

Georgia	19–15	Canada
Try: Zibzibadze 52' c Con: Kvirikashvili (1/1) 53'; Pen: Kvirikashvili (4/5) 2', 21', 26', 59'	Report	Pen: Underwood (3/4) 7', 17', 33'; Jones (2/2) 37', 57'

Dinamo Arena, Tbilisi
Attendance: 21,986
Referee: Lourens van der Merwe (South Africa)

Team details

FB	15	Merab Kvirikashvili
RW	14	Irakli Machkhaneli (c)		(substituted off) 28'
OC	13	Davit Kacharava
IC	12	Merab Sharikadze
LW	11	Tamaz Mchedlidze
FH	10	Lasha Malaghuradze
SH	9	Giorgi Begadze
N8	8	Giorgi Chkhaidze
OF	7	Mamuka Gorgodze
BF	6	Viktor Kolelishvili	(red card) 36'
RL	5	Levan Datunashvili		(substituted off) 79'
LL	4	Kote Mikautadze		(substituted off) 67'
TP	3	Davit Kubriashvili		(substituted off) 59'
HK	2	Shalva Mamukashvili		(substituted off) 73'
LP	1	Mikheil Nariashvili		(substituted off) 59'
Replacements:
HK	16	Simon Maisuradze		(substituted on) 73'
PR	17	Davit Khinchagishvili		(substituted on) 59'
PR	18	Levan Chilachava		(substituted on) 59'
FL	19	Shalva Sutiashvili		(substituted on) 67'
FL	20	Giorgi Tkhilaishvili		(substituted on) 79'
SH	21	Vazha Khutsishvili
CE	22	Tedo Zibzibadze		(substituted on) 28'
FB	23	Beka Tsiklauri
Coach:
(New Zealand) Milton Haig

FB	15	Matt Evans
RW	14	Jeff Hassler
OC	13	Conor Trainor
IC	12	Harry Jones
LW	11	Phil Mackenzie
FH	10	Liam Underwood		(substituted off) 40'
SH	9	Phil Mack		(substituted off) 70'
N8	8	Tyler Ardron (c)	(red card) 36'
OF	7	John Moonlight
BF	6	Jebb Sinclair
RL	5	Brett Beukeboom
LL	4	Jon Phelan		(substituted off) 70'
TP	3	Andrew Tiedemann		(substituted off) 41'
HK	2	Ray Barkwill		(substituted off) 40'
LP	1	Hubert Buydens
Replacements:
PR	16	Jake Illnicki		(substituted on) 41'
PR	17	Djustice Sears-Duru		(substituted on) 40'
HK	18	Benoît Piffero
LK	19	Tyler Hotson		(substituted on) 52'
FL	20	Adam Kleeberger
SH	21	Jamie Mackenzie		(substituted on) 70'
CE	22	Nick Blevins		(substituted on) 40'
FL	23	Nanyak Dala		(substituted on) 70'
Coach:
(New Zealand) Kieran Crowley

Touch judges:
Dudley Phillips (Ireland)
Vlad Iordachescu (Romania)
Television match official:
Geoff Warren (England)

9 November 2013
15:00 CET (UTC+1)

Italy	20–50	Australia
Try: McLean 11' c Cittadini 62' m Allan 78' m Con: Di Bernardo (1/1) 13'; Pen: Di Bernardo (1/3) 4'	Report	Try: Mowen 15' c Kuridrani 21' c Cummins (2) 31' m, 50' c Ashley-Cooper 58' c Tomane 66' c Folau 68' c Con: Cooper (4/5) 17', 22', 50', 58'; Lealiifano (2/2) 67', 70'; Pen: Lealiifano (1/1) 65'

Stadio Olimpico di Torino, Turin
Attendance: 25,177
Referee: Glen Jackson (New Zealand)

Team details

FB	15	Luke McLean
RW	14	Tommaso Benvenuti	(substituted off) 60'
OC	13	Luca Morisi
IC	12	Alberto Sgarbi
LW	11	Leonardo Sarto
FH	10	Alberto Di Bernardo	(substituted off) 60'
SH	9	Edoardo Gori	(substituted off) 70'
N8	8	Sergio Parisse (c)
OF	7	Robert Barbieri
BF	6	Alessandro Zanni
RL	5	Marco Bortolami	(substituted off) 64'
LL	4	Antonio Pavanello	(substituted off) 51'
TP	3	Martin Castrogiovanni	(substituted off) 59'
HK	2	Davide Giazzon	(substituted off) 51'
LP	1	Michele Rizzo	(substituted off) 51'
Replacements:
HK	16	Leonardo Ghiraldini	(substituted on) 51'
PR	17	Matías Agüero	(substituted on) 51'
PR	18	Lorenzo Cittadini	(substituted on) 59'
LK	19	Quintin Geldenhuys	(substituted on) 51'
LK	20	Joshua Furno	(substituted on) 64'
SH	21	Tobias Botes	(substituted on) 70'
FH	22	Tommaso Allan	(substituted on) 60'
WG	23	Tommaso Iannone	(substituted on) 60'
Coach:
(France) Jacques Brunel

FB	15	Israel Folau
RW	14	Adam Ashley-Cooper	(substituted off) 65'
OC	13	Tevita Kuridrani
IC	12	Matt To'omua
LW	11	Nick Cummins
FH	10	Quade Cooper	(substituted off) 59'
SH	9	Will Genia	(substituted off) 70'
N8	8	Ben Mowen (c)
OF	7	Michael Hooper	(substituted off) 65'
BF	6	Rob Simmons
RL	5	James Horwill
LL	4	Sitaleki Timani	(substituted off) 57'
TP	3	Ben Alexander	(substituted off) 51'
HK	2	Stephen Moore	(substituted off) 67'
LP	1	James Slipper	(substituted off) 60'
Replacements:
HK	16	Saia Fainga'a	(substituted on) 67'
PR	17	Benn Robinson	(substituted on) 60'
PR	18	Sekope Kepu	(substituted on) 51'
FL	19	Dave Dennis	(substituted on) 57'
FL	20	Liam Gill	(substituted on) 65'
SH	21	Nic White	(substituted on) 70'
CE	22	Christian Lealiifano	(substituted on) 59'
WG	23	Joe Tomane	(substituted on) 65'
Coach:
(Australia) Ewen McKenzie

Man of the Match:
Nick Cummins (Australia)

Touch judges:
Romain Poite (France)
John Lacey (Ireland)
Television match official:
Graham Hughes (England)

Notes:

- Luke McLean earned his 50th cap for Italy.
- Tommaso Allan made his international debut for Italy and scored his first test try.

9 November 2013
15:00 CET (UTC+1)

Belgium	12–36	(France) French Universities
Try: M. de Molder 45' c Penalty try 79' m Con: Brown (1/2) 45'	Report (In French)	Try: Penalty try 9' c Brousse 13' c Perraux 20' c Jedrasiak (2) 24' c, 34' m Con: Renaud (4/5) 9', 13', 22', 25'; Pen: Renaud (1/1) 11'

Stade des Trois Tilleuls, Boitsfort
Referee: Frank Himmer (Germany)

9 November 2013
14:30 GMT (UTC+0)

England	31–12	Argentina
Try: Launchbury 12' c Twelvetrees 20' c Ashton 33' c Morgan 77' c Con: Farrell (4/4) 13', 21', 34', 77'; Pen: Farrell (1/2) 5'	Report	Pen: Sánchez (3/4) 7', 45, 55'; Bosch (1/2) 17'

Twickenham, London
Attendance: 76,304
Referee: Pascal Gaüzère (France)

Team details

FB	15	Mike Brown	(substituted off) 75'
RW	14	Chris Ashton
OC	13	Joel Tomkins
IC	12	Billy Twelvetrees	(substituted off) 61'
LW	11	Ben Foden
FH	10	Owen Farrell
SH	9	Lee Dickson	(substituted off) 51'
N8	8	Billy Vunipola	(substituted off) 55'
OF	7	Chris Robshaw
BF	6	Tom Wood
RL	5	Courtney Lawes	(substituted off) 55'
LL	4	Joe Launchbury
TP	3	David Wilson	(substituted off) 62'
HK	2	Dylan Hartley	(substituted off) 62'
LP	1	Joe Marler	(substituted off) 40'
Replacements:
HK	16	Tom Youngs	(substituted on) 62'
PR	17	Alex Corbisiero	(substituted on) 40'
PR	18	Dan Cole	(substituted on) 62'
LK	19	Geoff Parling	(substituted on) 55'
N8	20	Ben Morgan	(substituted on) 55'
SH	21	Danny Care	(substituted on) 51'
FH	22	Toby Flood	(substituted on) 61'
FB	23	Alex Goode	(substituted on) 75'
Coach:
(England) Stuart Lancaster

FB	15	Lucas González Amorosino
RW	14	Horacio Agulla
OC	13	Marcelo Bosch
IC	12	Santiago Fernández
LW	11	Juan Imhoff	(substituted off) 31'
FH	10	Nicolás Sánchez	(substituted off) 64'
SH	9	Tomás Cubelli	(substituted off) 61'
N8	8	Juan Manuel Leguizamón (c)
OF	7	Julio Farías Cabello
BF	6	Pablo Matera
RL	5	Patricio Albacete
LL	4	Mariano Galarza	(substituted off) 54'
TP	3	Maximiliano Bustos	(substituted off) 66'
HK	2	Eusebio Guiñazú	(substituted off) 76'
LP	1	Marcos Ayerza	(substituted off) 76'
Replacements:
HK	16	Santiago Iglesias	(substituted on) 76'
PR	17	Nahuel Lobo	(substituted on) 76'
PR	18	Juan Pablo Orlandi	(substituted on) 66'
LK	19	Manuel Carizza	(substituted on) 54'
N8	20	Benjamín Macome		(substituted on) 67'
SH	21	Martín Landajo	(substituted on) 61'
CE	22	Gonzalo Tiesi	(substituted on) 64'	(substituted off) 67'
FB	23	Santiago Cordero	(substituted on) 31'
Coach:
(Argentina) Daniel Hourcade

Man of the Match:
Dylan Hartley (England)

Touch judges:
Chris Pollock (New Zealand)
Craig Joubert (South Africa)
Television match official:
Gareth Simmonds (Wales)

Notes:

- Santiago Cordero made his debut for Argentina.
- England won the Investec Challenge Cup, the first time the trophy has been contested.

9 November 2013
14:30 GMT (UTC+0)

Scotland	42–17	Japan
Try: Seymour (2) 31' m, 54' m Laidlaw 46' c Dickinson 63' c Weir 68' m Lamont 77' c Con: Laidlaw (2/4) 47', 64'; Weir (1/2) 78'; Pen: Laidlaw (2/3) 6, 21'	Report	Try: Fukuoka (2) 43' c, 51' c Con: Goromaru (2/2) 44', 52'; Pen: Goromaru (1/1) 35'

Murrayfield, Edinburgh
Attendance: 32,680
Referee: JP Doyle (England)

Team details

FB	15	Sean Maitland
RW	14	Tommy Seymour
OC	13	Nick De Luca
IC	12	Matt Scott
LW	11	Sean Lamont
FH	10	Ruaridh Jackson	(substituted off) 65'
SH	9	Greig Laidlaw	(substituted off) 73'
N8	8	David Denton
OF	7	Kelly Brown (c)
BF	6	Alasdair Strokosch	(substituted off) 70'
RL	5	Alastair Kellock	(substituted off) 57'
LL	4	Tim Swinson
TP	3	Euan Murray	(substituted off) 73'
HK	2	Ross Ford	(substituted off) 70'
LP	1	Ryan Grant	(substituted off) 28'
Replacements:
HK	16	Pat MacArthur	(substituted on) 70'
PR	17	Alasdair Dickinson	(substituted on) 28'
PR	18	Geoff Cross	(substituted on) 73'
LK	19	Richie Gray	(substituted on) 57'
FL	20	John Barclay	(substituted on) 70'
SH	21	Henry Pyrgos	(substituted on) 73'
FH	22	Duncan Weir	(substituted on) 65'
CE	23	Duncan Taylor
Coach:
(Australia) Scott Johnson

FB	15	Ayumu Goromaru	(yellow card) 77' to 80'
RW	14	Toshiaki Hirose (c)
OC	13	Male Sa'u
IC	12	Craig Wing		(substituted off) 70'
LW	11	Kenki Fukuoka
FH	10	Kosei Ono
SH	9	Fumiaki Tanaka		(substituted off) 61'
N8	8	Koliniasi Holani	(yellow card) 60' to 70'	(substituted off) 70'
OF	7	Michael Broadhurst
BF	6	Hendrik Tui
RL	5	Shinya Makabe
LL	4	Luke Thompson		(substituted off) 65'
TP	3	Kensuke Hatakeyama		(substituted off) 33'	(substituted on) 74'
HK	2	Shota Horie		(substituted off) 70'
LP	1	Masataka Mikami		(substituted off) 78'
Replacements:
HK	16	Yusuke Aoki		(substituted on) 70'
PR	17	Yusuke Nagae		(substituted on) 78'
PR	18	Hiroshi Yamashita		(substituted on) 33'	(substituted off) 74'
LK	19	Hitoshi Ono		(substituted on) 65'
N8	20	Takashi Kikutani		(substituted on) 70'
SH	21	Atsushi Hiwasa		(substituted on) 61'
FH	22	Yuu Tamura		(substituted on) 70'
WG	23	Yoshikazu Fujita
Coach:
(Australia) Scott Wisemantel

Man of the Match:
Tim Swinson (Scotland)

Touch judges:
Leighton Hodges (Wales)
Greg Garner (England)
Television match official:
Marshall Kilgore (Ireland)

9 November 2013
15:00 WET (UTC+0)

Portugal	13–36	Fiji
Try: Oliveira 74' c Con: P. Leal (1/1) 75'; Pen: P. Leal (2/3) 19', 63'	Report (In Portuguese)	Try: Nadolo 23' c Tikoirotuma 32' c Bai 46' m Botia 56' m Nalaga 69' m Kenatale 80' c Con: Bai (3/5) 24', 33', 80'

Universitário Lisboa, Lisbon
Referee: Juan Sylvestre (Argentina)

Team details

FB	15	Pedro Leal
RW	14	Gonçalo Foro
OC	13	Pedro Bettencourt	(substituted off) 75'
IC	12	Miguel Leal
LW	11	Duarte Moreira	(substituted off) 49'
FH	10	Francisco Almeida	(substituted off) 56'
SH	9	Francisco Magalhães
N8	8	Vasco Uva
OF	7	Julien Bardy	(substituted off) 40'
BF	6	António Duarte	(substituted off) 56'
RL	5	Gonçalo Uva
LL	4	Rafael Simões
TP	3	Bruno Medeiros	(substituted off) 63'
HK	2	João Correia (c)
LP	1	Jorge Segurado	(substituted off) 47'
Replacements:
PR	16	João Almeida	(substituted on) 47'
PR	17	Bruno Rocha	(substituted on) 63'
HK	18	Francisco Tavares
FL	19	Fernando Almeida	(substituted on) 56'
LK	20	Rui D'Orey	(substituted on) 40'
SH	21	Luís Salema	(substituted on) 56'
CE	22	Francisco Appleton	(substituted on) 75'
CE	23	Frederico Oliveira	(substituted on) 49'
Coach:
(Portugal) Frederico Sousa

FB	15	Timoci Nagusa	(yellow card) 27' to 37'
RW	14	Asaeli Tikoirotuma
OC	13	Nemani Nadolo		(substituted off) 49'
IC	12	Seremaia Bai
LW	11	Napolioni Nalaga		(substituted off) 52'
FH	10	Waisea Luveniyali		(substituted off) 65'
SH	9	Nikola Matawalu
N8	8	Sisa Koyamaibole		(substituted off) 59'
OF	7	Akapusi Qera (c)
BF	6	Apisai Naikatini
RL	5	Wame Lewaravu
LL	4	Apisalome Ratuniyarawa		(substituted off) 47'
TP	3	Setefano Somoca		(substituted off) 71'
HK	2	Viliame Veikoso		(substituted off) 59'
LP	1	Jerry Yanuyanutawa		(substituted off) 43'
Replacements:
HK	16	Seremaia Naureure		(substituted on) 59'
PR	17	Campese Ma'afu		(substituted on) 43'
PR	18	Manasa Saulo		(substituted on) 71'
LK	19	Dominiko Waqaniburotu		(substituted on) 47'
FL	20	Malakai Ravulo		(substituted on) 59'
SH	21	Nemia Kenatale		(substituted on) 65'
WG	22	Alex Rokobaro	(yellow card) 59' to 69'	(substituted on) 52'
CE	23	Levani Botia		(substituted on) 49'
Coach:
(Fiji) Inoke Male

Touch judges:
Ian Davies (Wales)
Andrew Davies (Wales)

9 November 2013
19:00 EET (UTC+2)

Romania	19–18	Tonga
Try: Macovei 48' c Con: Vlaicu (1/1) 49'; Pen: Vlaicu (4/5) 7', 40', 52', 80'	Report (In Romanian)	Try: Lilo (2) 56' c, 77' m Con: Apikotoa (1/1) 57'; Pen: Apikotoa (2/2) 18', 34'

Stadionul Arcul de Triumf, Bucharest
Referee: Francisco Pastrana (Argentina)

Team details

FB	15	Cătălin Fercu
RW	14	Ionuț Dumitru
OC	13	Csaba Gál		(substituted off) 74'
IC	12	Florin Vlaicu	(yellow card) 63' to 73'
LW	11	Stephen Hihetah		(substituted off) 68'
FH	10	Valentin Calafeteanu		(substituted off) 71'
SH	9	Florin Surugiu
N8	8	Mihai Macovei (c)	(yellow card) 55' to 65'
OF	7	Valentin Ursache
BF	6	Viorel Lucaci		(substituted off) 52'
RL	5	Marius Sirbe
LL	4	Valentin Popârlan		(substituted off) 49'
TP	3	Paulică Ion		(substituted off) 55'
HK	2	Otar Turashvili		(substituted off) 60'
LP	1	Mihai Lazăr		(substituted off) 63'
Replacements:
HK	16	Eugen Căpăţână		(substituted on) 60'
PR	17	Constantin Pristăviță		(substituted on) 63'
PR	18	Horaţiu Pungea		(substituted on) 55'
LK	19	Alin Coste		(substituted on) 49'
LK	20	Dorin Lazăr		(substituted on) 52'
CE	21	Cristian Dinis		(substituted on) 68'
CE	22	Robert Dascălu		(substituted on) 74'
FB	23	Dorin Manole		(substituted on) 71'
Coach:
(Wales) Lynn Howells

FB	15	Vunga Lilo
RW	14	William Helu
OC	13	Siale Piutau
IC	12	Sione Piukala
LW	11	Fetuʻu Vainikolo	(substituted off) 48'
FH	10	Fangatapu Apikotoa	(substituted off) 57'
SH	9	Tomasi Palu	(substituted off) 71'
N8	8	Viliami Maʻafu	(substituted off) 63'
OF	7	Nili Latu (c)
BF	6	Sione Kalamafoni
RL	5	Uili Koloʻofai	(substituted off) 75'
LL	4	Tukulua Lokotui
TP	3	Tevita Mailau	(substituted off) 52'
HK	2	Elvis Taione	(substituted off) 63'
LP	1	Sona Taumalolo	(substituted off) 57'
Replacements:
HK	16	Suliasi Taufalele	(substituted on) 63'
PR	17	Eddie Aholelei	(substituted on) 57'
PR	18	Sila Puafisi	(substituted on) 52'
LK	19	Opeti Fonua	(substituted on) 63'
FL	20	Viliami Faingaʻa	(substituted on) 75'
SH	21	Samisoni Fisilau	(substituted on) 71'
FH	22	Latiume Fosita	(substituted on) 57'
FB	23	David Halaifonua	(substituted on) 48'
Coach:
(Tonga) Mana Otai

Touch judges:
Andrew Mcmenemy (Scotland)
Adrian Graves (Scotland)
Television match official:
Alan Falzone (Italy)

9 November 2013
17:30 GMT (UTC+0)

Wales	15–24	South Africa
Pen: Halfpenny (5/5) 2', 8', 24', 33', 55'	Report	Try: De Villiers 10' c Du Plessis 16' c Du Preez 64' c Con: Steyn (2/2) 11', 17'; Lambie (1/1) 65'; Pen: Steyn (1/1) 4'

Millennium Stadium, Cardiff
Attendance: 66,490
Referee: Alain Rolland (Ireland)

Team details

FB	15	Leigh Halfpenny
RW	14	George North
OC	13	Jonathan Davies		(substituted off) 12'
IC	12	Scott Williams
LW	11	Liam Williams		(substituted off) 12'
FH	10	Rhys Priestland
SH	9	Mike Phillips		(substituted off) 72'
N8	8	Taulupe Faletau
OF	7	Sam Warburton (c)
BF	6	Dan Lydiate		(substituted off) 63'
RL	5	Alun Wyn Jones		(substituted off) 72'
LL	4	Bradley Davies
TP	3	Adam Jones		(substituted off) 30'
HK	2	Richard Hibbard		(substituted off) 63'
LP	1	Gethin Jenkins	(yellow card) 57' to 67'
Replacements:
HK	16	Ken Owens		(substituted on) 63'
PR	17	Paul James			(substituted on) 40'
PR	18	Scott Andrews		(substituted on) 30'	(substituted off) 40'
LK	19	Luke Charteris		(substituted on) 72'
FL	20	Justin Tipuric		(substituted on) 63'
SH	21	Lloyd Williams		(substituted on) 72'
CE	22	James Hook		(substituted on) 12'
CE	23	Ashley Beck		(substituted on) 12'
Coach:
(New Zealand) Warren Gatland

FB	15	Pat Lambie
RW	14	JP Pietersen		(substituted off) 71'
OC	13	Jaque Fourie
IC	12	Jean de Villiers (c)
LW	11	Bryan Habana
FH	10	Morné Steyn		(substituted off) 18'
SH	9	Fourie du Preez		(substituted off) 77'
N8	8	Duane Vermeulen
OF	7	Willem Alberts		(substituted off) 66'
BF	6	Francois Louw	(yellow card) 35' to 45'
RL	5	Flip van der Merwe
LL	4	Eben Etzebeth		(substituted off) 68'
TP	3	Frans Malherbe		(substituted off) 55'
HK	2	Bismarck du Plessis		(substituted off) 66'
LP	1	Tendai Mtawarira		(substituted off) 66'
Replacements:
HK	16	Adriaan Strauss		(substituted on) 66'
PR	17	Gurthrö Steenkamp		(substituted on) 66'
PR	18	Coenie Oosthuizen	(yellow card) 57' to 67'	(substituted on) 55'
LK	19	Pieter-Steph du Toit		(substituted on) 68'
FL	20	Siya Kolisi		(substituted on) 66'
SH	21	Ruan Pienaar		(substituted on) 77'
CE	22	JJ Engelbrecht		(substituted on) 71'
FB	23	Willie le Roux		(substituted on) 18'
Coach:
(South Africa) Heyneke Meyer

Man of the Match:
Fourie du Preez (South Africa)

Touch judges:
George Clancy (Ireland)
Marius Mitrea (Italy)
Television match official:
Eric Gauzins (France)

Notes:

- South Africa retained the Prince William Cup.
- Frans Malherbe and Pieter-Steph du Toit made their international debut for South Africa.

9 November 2013
17:45 WET (UTC+0)

Ireland	40–9	Samoa
Try: O'Mahony 25' m O'Brien 45' c D. Kearney (2) 65' c, 77' c McFadden 70' c Con: Jackson (3/5) 46', 66', 71'; Pen: Jackson (3/3) 3', 20', 40'	Report	Pen: T. Pisi (2/3) 7', 30'; Fotuali'i (1/1) 63'

Aviva Stadium, Dublin
Attendance: 39,108
Referee: Steve Walsh (Australia)

Team details

FB	15	Rob Kearney
RW	14	Tommy Bowe	(substituted off) 59'
OC	13	Brian O'Driscoll	(substituted off) 69'
IC	12	Gordon D'Arcy
LW	11	Fergus McFadden
FH	10	Paddy Jackson
SH	9	Conor Murray	(substituted off) 59'
N8	8	Jamie Heaslip (c)
OF	7	Chris Henry	(substituted off) 34'
BF	6	Peter O'Mahony	53' to 59'
RL	5	Devin Toner
LL	4	Mike McCarthy		(substituted off) 59'
TP	3	Mike Ross	(substituted off) 59'
HK	2	Rory Best	(substituted off) 69'
LP	1	Jack McGrath	(substituted off) 59'
Replacements:
HK	16	Seán Cronin	(substituted on) 69'
PR	17	Cian Healy	(substituted on) 59'
PR	18	Declan Fitzpatrick	(substituted on) 59'
LK	19	Paul O'Connell	(substituted on) 53'
FL	20	Seán O'Brien	(substituted on) 34'
SH	21	Eoin Reddan	(substituted on) 59'
CE	22	Ian Madigan	(substituted on) 69'
FB	23	David Kearney	(substituted on) 59'
Coach:
(New Zealand) Joe Schmidt

FB	15	Fa'atoina Autagavaia
RW	14	Alapati Leiua
OC	13	George Pisi	(yellow card) 39' to 49'	(substituted off) 73'
IC	12	Johnny Leota
LW	11	Brando Va'aulu		(substituted off) 56'
FH	10	Tusi Pisi		(substituted off) 56'
SH	9	Kahn Fotuali'i (c)
N8	8	Taiasina Tuifu'a		(substituted off) 66'
OF	7	Jack Lam
BF	6	Ofisa Treviranus
RL	5	Filo Paulo
LL	4	Fa'atiga Lemalu		(substituted off) 50'
TP	3	Logovi'i Mulipola		(substituted off) 7'
HK	2	Ole Avei		(substituted off) 50'
LP	1	Sakaria Taulafo		(substituted off) 73'
Replacements:
HK	16	Ti'i Paulo		(substituted on) 50'
PR	17	Viliamu Afatia		(substituted on) 73'
PR	18	James Johnston		(substituted on) 7'
LK	19	Joe Tekori		(substituted on) 50'
FL	20	Alafoti Fa'osiliva		(substituted on) 66'
SH	21	Jeremy Su'a		(substituted on) 56'
CE	22	Isaia Tuifua		(substituted on) 73'
CE	23	Fautua Otto		(substituted on) 56'
Coach:
(Samoa) Stephen Betham

Man of the Match:
Jack McGrath (Ireland)

Touch judges:
Wayne Barnes (England)
Luke Pearce (England)
Television match official:
Carlo Damasco (Italy)

Notes:

- This was Irelands biggest winning margin against Samoa.
- Jack McGrath and David Kearney, who scored two tries, made their debuts for Ireland, and Isaia Tuifua made his debut for Samoa.

9 November 2013
17:00 CLST (UTC-3)

Chile	3–26	Spain
Pen: Perrota (1/3) 47'	Report	Try: Feijoo (2) 27' m, 74' c Cook (2) 70' c, 79' c Con: González (2/3) 70', 75'; Genua (1/1) 80'

Centro de Alto Rendimiento del Rugby, Santiago
Referee: Claudio Antonio (Argentina)

Team details

FB	15	Francisco Neira
RW	14	Germán Herrera		(substituted off) 75'
OC	13	Felipe Brangier
IC	12	Francisco de la Fuente
LW	11	Pedro Verschae		(substituted off) 76'
FH	10	Francisco González
SH	9	Juan Pablo Perrota		(substituted off) 68'
N8	8	Nikola Bursic
OF	7	Benjamín Soto	(yellow card) 78' to 80'
BF	6	Ignacio Silva
RL	5	Matías Cabrera (c)
LL	4	Rolando Pellerano		(substituted off) 56'
TP	3	Roberto Oyarzún		(substituted off) 48'
HK	2	Manuel Gurruchaga		(substituted off) 65'
LP	1	Alejandro Rios		(substituted off) 75'
Replacements:
PR	16	Francisco Bórquez		(substituted on) 75'
HK	17	Renzo Bacigalupo		(substituted on) 65'
FL	18	Simón Pardakhty		(substituted on) 56'
LK	19	Cristóbal Niedmann
SH	20	Juan Pablo Larenas		(substituted on) 68'
CE	21	Felipe Porter		(substituted on) 75'
WG	22	Mauricio Urrutia		(substituted on) 76'
PR	23	Ramón Ayarza		(substituted on) 48'
Coach:
(Argentina) Omar Turcumán

FB	15	César Sempere
RW	14	Marcos Poggi
OC	13	Ignacio Contardi	(substituted off) 50'
IC	12	Javier Canosa
LW	11	Matías Tudela
FH	10	Daniel Snee
SH	9	Pablo Feijoo (c)
N8	8	Federico Negrillo	(substituted off) 70'
OF	7	Glen Rolls	(substituted off) 65'
BF	6	Gauthier Gibouin
RL	5	Aníbal Bonán	(substituted off) 48'
LL	4	Jesús Recuerda
TP	3	Jesús Moreno	(substituted off) 48'
HK	2	Fabien Rofes
LP	1	Beñat Auzqui	(substituted off) 65'
Replacements:
PR	16	Ion Insausti	(substituted on) 48'
PR	17	Joe Hutchinson	(substituted on) 71'
FL	18	Alejandro Blanco	(substituted on) 61'
FL	19	Adam Newton	(substituted on) 68'
LK	20	Matthew Cook	(substituted on) 48'
SH	21	Igor Genua		(substituted on) 75'
FB	22	Ignacio Gutierrez	(substituted on) 48'	(substituted off) 75'
PR	23	Agustín Ortíz	(substituted on) 61'
Coach:
(Spain) Santiago Santos

Touch judges:
Andrés Ramos (Argentina)
José Covassi (Argentina)

9 November 2013
21:00 CET (UTC+1)

France	19–26	New Zealand
Try: Dulin 68' c Con: Parra (1/1) 69'; Pen: Parra (4/6) 9', 24', 31', 42'	Report	Try: Piutau 46' c Read 64' c Con: Carter (1/1) 47'; Cruden (1/1) 65'; Pen: Carter (4/4) 12', 19', 27', 44'

Stade de France, Saint-Denis
Attendance: 80,000
Referee: Jaco Peyper (South Africa)

Team details

FB	15	Brice Dulin
RW	14	Yoann Huget
OC	13	Florian Fritz	(substituted off) 66'
IC	12	Wesley Fofana
LW	11	Maxime Médard
FH	10	Rémi Talès
SH	9	Morgan Parra	(substituted off) 76'
N8	8	Damien Chouly
OF	7	Wenceslas Lauret	(substituted off) 73'
BF	6	Thierry Dusautoir (c)
RL	5	Yoann Maestri	(substituted off) 56'
LL	4	Pascal Papé
TP	3	Nicolas Mas	(substituted off) 56'
HK	2	Benjamin Kayser	(substituted off) 52'
LP	1	Yannick Forestier	(substituted off) 60'
Replacements:
HK	16	Dimitri Szarzewski	(substituted on) 52'
PR	17	Vincent Debaty	(substituted on) 60'
PR	18	Rabah Slimani	(substituted on) 56'
LK	19	Sébastien Vahaamahina	(substituted on) 56'
FL	20	Antonie Claassen	(substituted on) 73'
SH	21	Jean-Marc Doussain	(substituted on) 76'
FH	22	Camille Lopez
CE	23	Gaël Fickou	(substituted on) 66'
Coach:
(France) Philippe Saint-André

FB	15	Israel Dagg
RW	14	Cory Jane	(substituted off) 69'
OC	13	Ben Smith
IC	12	Ma'a Nonu
LW	11	Charles Piutau
FH	10	Dan Carter	(substituted off) 52'
SH	9	Aaron Smith	(substituted off) 71'
N8	8	Kieran Read
OF	7	Richie McCaw (c)
BF	6	Liam Messam
RL	5	Sam Whitelock
LL	4	Brodie Retallick
TP	3	Owen Franks	(substituted off) 53'
HK	2	Keven Mealamu	(substituted off) 60'
LP	1	Tony Woodcock	(substituted off) 69'
Replacements:
HK	16	Dane Coles	(substituted on) 60'
PR	17	Wyatt Crockett	(substituted on) 69'
PR	18	Charlie Faumuina	(substituted on) 53'
FL	19	Steve Luatua
FL	20	Sam Cane
SH	21	Tawera Kerr-Barlow	(substituted on) 71'
FH	22	Aaron Cruden	(substituted on) 52'
CE	23	Ryan Crotty	(substituted on) 69'
Coach:
(New Zealand) Steve Hansen

Touch judges:
Nigel Owens (Wales)
Stuart Berry (South Africa)
Television match official:
Jim Yuille (Scotland)

Notes:

- New Zealand retained the Dave Gallaher Trophy.
- Richie McCaw became international rugby's most-capped captain, leading New Zealand for the 85th time in his 122nd test.
- Rabah Slimani made his international debut for France.

9 November 2013
19:00 EST (UTC-5)

United States	19–29	Māori All Blacks
Try: Dolan 71' c Con: Siddall (1/1) 73'; Pen: Siddall (4/4) 14', 26', 38', 63'	Report	Try: Gibson-Park 5' c Bateman (2) 43' c, 55' m Katene 78' c Con: Robinson (3/4) 6', 44', 79'; Pen: Robinson (1/1) 69'

PPL Park, Chester, Pennsylvania
Attendance: 18,500
Referee: Chris Assmus (Canada)

Team details

FB	15	Adam Siddall
RW	14	Luke Hume
OC	13	Seamus Kelly
IC	12	Andrew Suniula	(substituted off) 64'
LW	11	Tim Maupin
FH	10	Toby L'Estrange	(substituted off) 48'
SH	9	Mike Petri
N8	8	Cam Dolan
OF	7	Peter Dahl
BF	6	Todd Clever (c)	48' to 50'
RL	5	Tai Tuisamoa
LL	4	Graham Harriman
TP	3	Shawn Pittman	(substituted off) 48'
HK	2	Phil Thiel	(substituted off) 75'
LP	1	Nicholas Wallace
Replacements:
HK	16	Zach Fenoglio	(substituted on) 75'
PR	17	Titi Lamositele	(substituted on) 48'
PR	18	Olive Kilifi
LK	19	John Cullen
FL	20	Kyle Sumsion	(substituted on) 48'	(substituted off) 58'
SH	21	Shaun Davies
WG	22	Zachary Pangelinan	(substituted on) 48'
FH	23	Folau Niua	(substituted on) 64'
Coach:
(United States) Mike Tolkin

FB	15	Robbie Robinson
RW	14	Kurt Baker		(substituted off) 66'
OC	13	Charlie Ngatai
IC	12	Tim Bateman (c)
LW	11	Matt Proctor
FH	10	Ihaia West
SH	9	Jamison Gibson-Park
N8	8	Blade Thomson		(substituted off) 63'
OF	7	Luke Braid
BF	6	Shane Christie
RL	5	Joe Wheeler	(yellow card) 31' to 41'	(substituted off) 41'
LL	4	Jarrad Hoeata
TP	3	Ben Afeaki		(substituted off) 79'
HK	2	Ash Dixon		(substituted off) 69'
LP	1	Kane Hames		(substituted off) 47'
Replacements:
HK	16	Joe Royal		(substituted on) 69'
PR	17	Chris Eves		(substituted on) 47'
PR	18	Nick Barrett		(substituted on) 79'
LK	19	Luke Katene		(substituted on) 41'
N8	20	Elliot Dixon		(substituted on) 63'
SH	21	Chris Smylie
CE	22	Jackson Willison
WG	23	Zac Guildford		(substituted on) 66'
Coach:
(New Zealand) Colin Cooper

Man of the Match:
Cam Dolan (United States)

Touch judges:
David Smortchevsky (Canada)
Andrew McMaster (Canada)
Television match official:
Bryan Arclero (Canada)

10 November 2013
15:00 GMT (UTC+0)

Oxford University (England)	24–31	Russia
Try: Turner 16' c Lamont 31' c Rowlands 39' c Con: Hudson (1/1) 17'; Taylor (2/2) 32', 40'; Pen: Janney (1/3) 21'	Report	Try: Garbuzov 23' c Simplikevich 42' m Tsnobiladze 67' c Penalty try 75' c Galinovsky 80' m Con: Kushnarev (1/2) 24'; Gaisin (2/3) 68', 75'

Oxford University Sports Centre, Oxford
Referee: Ian Tempest (England)

=== 12–17 November ===
12 November 2013
19:45 GMT (UTC+0)

Gloucester (England)	40–5	Japan
Try: Sharples (3) 18' m, 24' c, 38' c Simpson-Daniel 21' c Reynolds 64' c Cox 75' c Con: Cook (5/6) 22', 26', 39', 65', 76'	Report	Try: Ives 2' m

Kingsholm Stadium, Gloucester
Attendance: 6,998
Referee: Ian Tempest (England)

Team details

FB	15	(England) Rob Cook
RW	14	(England) Charlie Sharples
OC	13	(England) Jonny May	(substituted off) 56'
IC	12	(England) Mike Tindall	(substituted off) 51'
LW	11	(England) James Simpson-Daniel
FH	10	(England) Ryan Mills
SH	9	(New Zealand) Jimmy Cowan	(substituted off) 51'
N8	8	(England) Matthew Cox
OF	7	(England) Andy Hazell	(substituted off) 46'
BF	6	(England) Tom Savage (c)
RL	5	(England) James Hudson	(substituted off) 2'
LL	4	(England) Elliott Stooke	(substituted off) 65'
TP	3	(England) Rupert Harden	(substituted off) 46'
HK	2	(England) Darren Dawidiuk	(substituted off) 48'	(substituted on) 61'
LP	1	(England) Yann Thomas
Replacements:
HK	16	(England) Koree Britton	(substituted on) 48'	(substituted off) 61'
PR	17	(England) James Gibbons	(substituted on) 65'
PR	18	(England) Shaun Knight	(substituted on) 48'
FL	19	(England) Lewis Ludlow	(substituted on) 46'
FL	20	(England) Ross Moriarty	(substituted on) 2'
SH	21	(England) Dan Robson	(substituted on) 51'
FH	22	(England) Billy Burns	(substituted on) 51'
WG	23	(Wales) Steph Reynolds	(substituted on) 56'
Coach:
(Wales) Nigel Davies

FB	15	Yoshikazu Fujita
RW	14	Akihito Yamada
OC	13	Seiichi Shimomura			57' to 67'
IC	12	Yasuki Hayashi
LW	11	Yuta Imamura		(substituted off) 49'	(substituted on) 57'	(substituted off) 67'
FH	10	Yuu Tamura		(substituted off) 70'
SH	9	Atsushi Hiwasa
N8	8	Takashi Kikutani (c)
OF	7	Kyosuke Horie	(yellow card) 51' to 61'
BF	6	Justin Ives		(substituted off) 66'
RL	5	Shoji Ito
LL	4	Shinya Makabe		(substituted off) 59'
TP	3	Hiroshi Yamashita		(substituted off) 56'
HK	2	Yusuke Aoki		(substituted on) 58'
LP	1	Yusuke Nagae		(substituted off) 42'
Replacements:
HK	16	Shota Horie		(substituted on) 58'
PR	17	Hisateru Hirashima		(substituted on) 42'
PR	18	Takuma Asahara		(substituted on) 56'
LK	19	Hitoshi Ono		(substituted on) 59'
FL	20	Michael Broadhurst		(substituted on) 66'
FH	21	Kosei Ono		(substituted on) 70'
CE	22	Kotaro Matsushima		(substituted on) 49'	(substituted off) 66'
WG	23	Kilryong So			(substituted on) 66'
Coach:
(Australia) Scott Wisemantel

Touch judges:
Paul Dix (England)
Stuart Terheege (England)

15 November 2013
19:30 GMT (UTC+0)

Russia	13–40	Japan
Try: Ostroushko 11' c Con: Gaisin (1/1) 12'; Pen: Gaisin (2/2) 19', 23'	Report	Try: Tui 14' c Broadhurst 43' c Sa'u (2) 48' m, 56' c Hirose 66' m Con: Goromaru (3/5) 16', 43', 57'; Pen: Goromaru (3/3) 2', 26', 47'

Eirias Stadium, Colwyn Bay, Wales
Attendance: 1,250
Referee: Luke Pearce (England)

Team details

FB	15	Ramil Gaisin		(substituted off) 64'
RW	14	Vasily Artemyev	(yellow card) 45' to 55'
OC	13	Dimitry Gerasimov		(substituted off) 61'
IC	12	Alexei Makovetskiy		(substituted off) 77'
LW	11	Vladimir Ostroushko
FH	10	Sergey Sugrobov
SH	9	Anton Ryabov
N8	8	Viktor Gresev
OF	7	Pavel Butenko
BF	6	Alexander Khudiakov
RL	5	Andrei Garbuzov		(substituted off) 57'
LL	4	Alexander Voytov (c)		(substituted off) 59'
TP	3	Evgeni Pronenko		(substituted off) 43'
HK	2	Valery Tsnobiladze		(substituted off) 47'
LP	1	Grigory Tsnobiladze
Replacements:
HK	16	Vladislav Korshunov		(substituted on) 47'
PR	17	Sergey Sekisov
PR	18	Innokenty Zykov		(substituted on) 43'
LK	19	Denis Antonov		(substituted on) 59'
FL	20	Artem Fatakhov		(substituted on) 57'
SH	21	Alexey Shcherban		(substituted on) 77'
CE	22	Igor Galinovsky		(substituted on) 61'
FB	23	Denis Simplikevich		(substituted on) 64'
Coach:
(Wales) Kingsley Jones

FB	15	Ayumu Goromaru
RW	14	Toshiaki Hirose (c)
OC	13	Male Sa'u
IC	12	Yuu Tamura	(substituted off) 67'
LW	11	Yoshikazu Fujita	(substituted off) 67'
FH	10	Kosei Ono
SH	9	Fumiaki Tanaka	(substituted off) 61'
N8	8	Koliniasi Holani	(substituted off) 57'
OF	7	Michael Broadhurst
BF	6	Hendrik Tui
RL	5	Luke Thompson
LL	4	Hitoshi Ono	(substituted off) 49'
TP	3	Kensuke Hatakeyama	48' to 53'		(substituted off) 59'
HK	2	Shota Horie	(substituted off) 74'
LP	1	Masataka Mikami	(substituted off) 65'
Replacements:
HK	16	Hiroki Yuhara	(substituted on) 74'
PR	17	Hisateru Hirashima	(substituted on) 65'
PR	18	Hiroshi Yamashita	(substituted on) 48'	(substituted off) 53'	(substituted on) 59'
LK	19	Shinya Makabe	(substituted on) 49'
LK	20	Justin Ives	(substituted on) 57'
SH	21	Atsushi Hiwasa	(substituted on) 61'
CE	22	Seiichi Shimomura	(substituted on) 67'
WG	23	Akihito Yamada	(substituted on) 67'
Coach:
(Australia) Scott Wisemantel

Touch judges:
Rhys Thomas (Wales)
Andrew Davies (Wales)

15 November 2013
20:00 BRST (UTC-2)

Brazil	0–68	Portugal
	Report (In Portuguese)	Try: G. Uva 9' c Duarte 24' c Simões (2) 30' m, 45' c Oliveira 38' c V. Uva 49' c Foro (2) 55' c, 64' c Bardy 71' c Esteves 73' c Con: P. Leal (9/10) 9', 25', 40', 46', 50', 56', 65', 71', 74'

Arena Barueri, Barueri, São Paulo
Attendance: 5,193
Referee: Federico Anselmi (Argentina)

Team details

FB	15	Guilherme Coghetto
RW	14	Lucas Tranquez
OC	13	Gustavo Badino
IC	12	Pedro Lopes
LW	11	André Luiz
FH	10	Alexandre Browne
SH	9	Felipe Claro
N8	8	Nick Smith
OF	7	Matheus Daniel
BF	6	João Luiz da Ros
RL	5	Lucas Piero
LL	4	Diego Pietrobon
TP	3	Jardel Vettorato
HK	2	Daniel Danielewicz (c)
LP	1	Jonatas Paulo
Replacements:
HK	16	Nelson Oliveira
PR	17	Lucas Abud
FL	18	Pedro Rosa
LK	19	Mauricio Camargo
SH	20	Bruno Garcia
SH	21	João Neto
FB	22	Matheus Silva
CE	23	Moisés Cavalleri
Coach:
(New Zealand) Brent Frew

FB	15	Pedro Leal
RW	14	Gonçalo Foro
OC	13	Pedro Bettencourt
IC	12	Miguel Leal
LW	11	Frederico Oliveira
FH	10	Francisco Almeida
SH	9	Francisco Pinto
N8	8	Vasco Uva	(yellow card) 34' to 44'
OF	7	Julien Bardy
BF	6	Antônio Duarte
RL	5	Gonçalo Uva
LL	4	Rafael Simões
TP	3	Jorge Segurado
HK	2	João Correia (c)
LP	1	Bruno Medeiros
Replacements:
PR	16	João Almeida
PR	17	Bruno Rocha
HK	18	Francisco Tavares
FL	19	Fernando Almeida
LK	20	Eric dos Santos
SH	21	Luís Salema
CE	22	Francisco Appleton
WG	23	Adérito Esteves
Coach:
(Portugal) Frederico Sousa

Touch judges:
Francisco González (Uruguay)
Alejandro Longres (Uruguay)

16 November 2013
14:00 GET (UTC+4)

Georgia	23–25	United States
Try: Kvirikashvili 13' c Sharikadze 66' c Con: Kvirikashvili (2/2) 14', 67'; Pen: Kvirikashvili (3) 4', 24' 76'	Report	Try: Wyles 22' m Scully 39' c Wallace 55' c Con: Siddall (2/3) 40', 56'; Pen: Siddall (2/3) 26', 80'

Rustavi Stadium, Rustavi
Attendance: 6,509
Referee: Mike Fraser (New Zealand)

Team details

FB	15	Merab Kvirikashvili
RW	14	Tamaz Mchedlidze	(substituted off) 68'
OC	13	Davit Kacharava
IC	12	Merab Sharikadze
LW	11	Tedo Zibzibadze
FH	10	Lasha Khmaladze
SH	9	Giorgi Begadze
N8	8	Giorgi Chkhaidze
OF	7	Mamuka Gorgodze (c)
BF	6	Shalva Sutiashvili	(substituted off) 73'
RL	5	Levan Datunashvili	(substituted off) 63'
LL	4	Kote Mikautadze
TP	3	Davit Kubriashvili	(substituted off) 56'
HK	2	Shalva Mamukashvili	(substituted off) 68'
LP	1	Davit Khinchagishvili	(substituted off) 56'
Replacements:
HK	16	Simon Maisuradze	(substituted on) 68'
PR	17	Mikheil Nariashvili	(substituted on) 56'
PR	18	Levan Chilachava	(substituted on) 56'
LK	19	Giorgi Nemsadze	(substituted on) 63'
FL	20	Giorgi Tkhilaishvili	(substituted on) 73'
SH	21	Vazha Khutsishvili
FH	22	Lasha Malaghuradze
FB	23	Beka Tsiklauri	(substituted on) 68'
Coach:
(New Zealand) Milton Haig

FB	15	Chris Wyles
RW	14	Blaine Scully
OC	13	Folau Niua
IC	12	Andrew Suniula
LW	11	Tim Maupin	(substituted off) 58'
FH	10	Adam Siddall
SH	9	Mike Petri
N8	8	Cam Dolan
OF	7	Derek Asbun	(substituted off) 69'
BF	6	Todd Clever (c)
RL	5	Samu Manoa
LL	4	Graham Harriman
TP	3	Eric Fry
HK	2	Phillip Thiel
LP	1	Nicholas Wallace	(substituted off) 77'
Replacements:
HK	16	Zach Fenoglio
PR	17	Olive Kilifi	(substituted on) 77'
PR	18	Titi Lamositele
FL	19	Inaki Basauri
FL	20	John Quill	(substituted on) 69'
SH	21	Shaun Davies
CE	22	Seamus Kelly
WG	23	Luke Hume	(substituted on) 58'
Coach:
(United States) Mike Tolkin

Touch judges:
Ian Davies (Wales)
Chris Williams (Wales)
Television match official:
Carlo Damasco (Italy)

16 November 2013
15:00 CET (UTC+1)

Italy	37–31	Fiji
Try: Parisse 29' c McLean 33' c Penalty try 57' c Vosawai 68' c Con: Orquera (3/3) 30', 34', 58'; Allan (1/1) 69'; Pen: Orquera (3/5) 3', 25', 46'	Report	Try: Talebula 7' m Nagusa (2) 47' m, 75' c Nadolo 59' c Nalaga 71' c Con: Bai (2/4) 60', 72', 75'

Stadio Giovanni Zini, Cremona
Attendance: 18,600
Referee: Leighton Hodges (Wales)

Team details

FB	15	Luke McLean
RW	14	Giovanbattista Venditti
OC	13	Gonzalo Canale
IC	12	Luca Morisi		(substituted off) 9'
LW	11	Tommaso Iannone
FH	10	Luciano Orquera		(substituted off) 67'
SH	9	Edoardo Gori		(substituted off) 40'
N8	8	Sergio Parisse (c)	(yellow card) 73' to 80'
OF	7	Mauro Bergamasco		(substituted off) 58'
BF	6	Alessandro Zanni
RL	5	Valerio Bernabò		(substituted off) 67'
LL	4	Quintin Geldenhuys
TP	3	Martin Castrogiovanni		(substituted off) 58'
HK	2	Leonardo Ghiraldini		(substituted off) 58'
LP	1	Michele Rizzo		(substituted off) 58'
Replacements:
HK	16	Davide Giazzon		(substituted on) 58'
PR	17	Matías Agüero		(substituted on) 58'
PR	18	Lorenzo Cittadini		(substituted on) 58'
LK	19	Joshua Furno		(substituted on) 67'
N8	20	Manoa Vosawai		(substituted on) 58'
SH	21	Tobias Botes		(substituted on) 40'
FH	22	Tommaso Allan		(substituted on) 67'
CE	23	Michele Campagnaro		(substituted on) 9'
Coach:
(France) Jacques Brunel

FB	15	Metuisela Talebula
RW	14	Timoci Nagusa
OC	13	Asaeli Tikoirotuma	(yellow card) 24' to 34'
IC	12	Nemani Nadolo	(yellow card) 28' to 38'
LW	11	Napolioni Nalaga
FH	10	Seremaia Bai
SH	9	Nemia Kenatale		(substituted off) 56'
N8	8	Sakiusa Matadigo	(yellow card) 25' to 35'	(substituted off) 63'
OF	7	Akapusi Qera (c)	(yellow card) 20' to 30'
BF	6	Dominiko Waqaniburotu		(substituted off) 76'
RL	5	Wame Lewaravu
LL	4	Apisai Naikatini		(substituted off) 42'
TP	3	Setefano Somoca		(substituted off) 61'
HK	2	Viliame Veikoso		(substituted off) 54'
LP	1	Jerry Yanuyanutawa		(substituted off) 61'
Replacements:
HK	16	Seremaia Naureure		(substituted on) 54'
PR	17	Campese Ma'afu		(substituted on) 61'
PR	18	Manasa Saulo		(substituted on) 61'
N8	19	Sisa Koyamaibole	(yellow card) 67' to 77'	(substituted on) 42'
FL	20	Malakai Ravulo		(substituted on) 63'
SH	21	Nikola Matawalu		(substituted on) 56'
FH	22	Waisea Luveniyali
CE	23	Adriu Delai		(substituted on) 76'
Coach:
(Fiji) Inoke Male

Touch judges:
Jaco Peyper (South Africa)
Joaquín Montes (Uruguay)
Television match official:
Eric Gauzins (France)

Notes:

- Martin Castrogiovanni and Sergio Parisse become the third and fourth Italian players to earn 100 caps.
- Michele Campagnaro made his international debut for Italy.
- Fiji's five yellow cards broke the record for the number of yellow cards by one team in an international match.

16 November 2013
15:00 CET (UTC+1)

French Barbarians (France)	20–19	Samoa
Try: Adams (2) 30' c, 60' m Vosloo 40' m Con: Trinh-Duc (1/3) 31'; Pen: Trinh-Duc (1/2) 75'	Report	Try: Leiua 2' m Va'aulu 17' c Fotuali'i 41' c Con: Fotuali'i (2/3) 18', 42'

Stade Marcel-Michelin, Clermont-Ferrand
Attendance: 10,138
Referee: JP Doyle (England)

Team details

FB	15	(Ivory Coast) Silvère Tian
RW	14	(New Zealand) Sitiveni Sivivatu
OC	13	(France) Aurélien Rougerie (c)
IC	12	(France) Rémi Lamerat
LW	11	(New Zealand) David Smith
FH	10	(France) François Trinh-Duc
SH	9	(South Africa) Heini Adams
N8	8	(France) Julien Bonnaire
OF	7	(France) Pierre Rabadan
BF	6	(South Africa) Gerhard Vosloo
RL	5	(Cameroon) Robins Tchale-Watchou
LL	4	(France) Christophe Samson
TP	3	(France) David Attoub
HK	2	(France) Brice Mach
LP	1	(France) Jean-Baptiste Poux
Replacements:
HK	16	(New Zealand) Rémi Bonfils
PR	17	(Bosnia and Herzegovina) Kenan Mutapcic
PR	18	(France) Aretz Iguiniz
LK	19	(France) Thibault Lassalle
FL	20	(France) Jonathan Best
SH	21	(France) Valentin Courrent
FH	22	(France) David Skrela
WG	23	(France) Alexis Palisson
Coaches:
(France) Fabrice Landreau (France) Franck Corrihons (France) Philippe Rougé-Thomas

FB	15	Fa'atoina Autagavaia
RW	14	Alapati Leiua
OC	13	Isaia Tuifua
IC	12	Johnny Leota
LW	11	Brando Va'aulu
FH	10	Kahn Fotuali'i (c)
SH	9	Jeremy Su'a
N8	8	Faifili Levave
OF	7	Jack Lam
BF	6	Alafoti Fa'osiliva
RL	5	Joe Tekori
LL	4	Piula Faasalele
TP	3	James Johnston
HK	2	Ti'i Paulo
LP	1	Viliamu Afatia
Replacements:
HK	16	Ole Avei
PR	17	Anthony Perenise
PR	18	Benjamin Sa
LK	19	Filo Paulo
FL	20	Ofisa Treviranus
FH	21	Patrick Fa'apale
WG	22	Sinoti Sinoti
CE	23	Ken Pisi
Coach:
(Samoa) Stephen Betham

Touch judges:
FFR Appt (France)
FFR Appt (France)

16 November 2013
14:30 GMT (UTC+0)

England	22–30	New Zealand
Try: Launchbury 23' c Con: Farrell (1/1) 24'; Pen: Farrell (5/5) 6, 33', 38', 52', 59'	Report	Try: Savea (2) 1' c, 63' c Read 16' c Con: Carter (2/2) 2', 17'; Cruden (1/1) 64'; Pen: Carter (1/1) 12'; Cruden (2/3) 31', 71'

Twickenham, London
Attendance: 81,739
Referee: Craig Joubert (South Africa)

Team details

FB	15	Mike Brown
RW	14	Chris Ashton
OC	13	Joel Tomkins	(substituted off) 76'
IC	12	Billy Twelvetrees
LW	11	Ben Foden
FH	10	Owen Farrell	(substituted off) 67'
SH	9	Lee Dickson	(substituted off) 65'
N8	8	Billy Vunipola	(substituted off) 57'
OF	7	Chris Robshaw (c)
BF	6	Tom Wood
RL	5	Courtney Lawes
LL	4	Joe Launchbury	(substituted off) 46'
TP	3	Dan Cole	(substituted off) 76'
HK	2	Dylan Hartley	(substituted off) 50'
LP	1	Joe Marler	(substituted off) 76'
Replacements:
HK	16	Tom Youngs	(substituted on) 50'
PR	17	Matt Mullan	(substituted on) 76'
PR	18	David Wilson	(substituted on) 76'
LK	19	Geoff Parling	(substituted on) 46'
N8	20	Ben Morgan	(substituted on) 57'
SH	21	Ben Youngs	(substituted on) 65'
FH	22	Toby Flood	(substituted on) 67'
FB	23	Alex Goode	(substituted on) 76'
Coach:
(England) Stuart Lancaster

FB	15	Israel Dagg
RW	14	Charles Piutau		(substituted off) 71'
OC	13	Ben Smith
IC	12	Ma'a Nonu
LW	11	Julian Savea
FH	10	Dan Carter		(substituted off) 25'
SH	9	Aaron Smith		(substituted off) 71'
N8	8	Kieran Read	(yellow card) 32' to 42'
OF	7	Richie McCaw (c)
BF	6	Liam Messam		(substituted off) 67'
RL	5	Sam Whitelock
LL	4	Brodie Retallick		(substituted off) 65'
TP	3	Owen Franks		(substituted off) 42'
HK	2	Keven Mealamu		(substituted off) 60'
LP	1	Tony Woodcock		(substituted off) 40'
Replacements:
HK	16	Dane Coles		(substituted on) 60'
PR	17	Wyatt Crockett		(substituted on) 40'
PR	18	Charlie Faumuina		(substituted on) 42'
LK	19	Luke Romano		(substituted on) 65'
FL	20	Steve Luatua		(substituted on) 67'
SH	21	Tawera Kerr-Barlow		(substituted on) 71'
FH	22	Aaron Cruden		(substituted on) 25'
CE	23	Ryan Crotty		(substituted on) 71'
Coach:
(New Zealand) Steve Hansen

Man of the Match:
Julian Savea (New Zealand)

Touch judges:
Nigel Owens (Wales)
Francisco Pastrana (Argentina)
Television match official:
Gareth Simmonds (Wales)

Notes:

- Dan Carter became the fifth All Black to earn 100 caps.
- Dylan Hartley earned his 50th cap for England, and Sam Whitelock earned his 50th cap for New Zealand.
- New Zealand regained the Hillary Shield after losing it in 2012.

16 November 2013
14:30 GMT (UTC+0)

Wales	40–6	Argentina
Try: Phillips 8' c North 23' c Faletau 55' c Owens 66' c Con: Halfpenny (4/4) 9', 23', 56', 67'; Pen: Halfpenny (4/5) 5', 17', 40', 43'	Report	Pen: Sánchez (2/3) 28', 50'

Millennium Stadium, Cardiff
Attendance: 46,253
Referee: John Lacey (Ireland)

Team details

FB	15	Leigh Halfpenny
RW	14	George North
OC	13	Cory Allen		(substituted off) 72'
IC	12	Scott Williams
LW	11	Liam Williams
FH	10	Dan Biggar		(substituted off) 68'
SH	9	Mike Phillips		(substituted off) 68'
N8	8	Taulupe Faletau		(substituted off) 74'
OF	7	Justin Tipuric	(yellow card) 11' to 21'
BF	6	Sam Warburton (c)
RL	5	Alun Wyn Jones
LL	4	Bradley Davies		(substituted off) 57'
TP	3	Rhodri Jones		(substituted off) 68'
HK	2	Richard Hibbard		(substituted off) 62'
LP	1	Gethin Jenkins		(substituted off) 68'
Replacements:
HK	16	Ken Owens		(substituted on) 62'
PR	17	Paul James		(substituted on) 68'
PR	18	Samson Lee		(substituted on) 68'
LK	19	Luke Charteris		(substituted on) 57'
FL	20	Ryan Jones		(substituted on) 74'
SH	21	Lloyd Williams		(substituted on) 68'
CE	22	James Hook		(substituted on) 68'
CE	23	Ashley Beck		(substituted on) 72'
Coach:
(New Zealand) Warren Gatland

FB	15	Joaquín Tuculet	(substituted off) 40'
RW	14	Horacio Agulla
OC	13	Marcelo Bosch
IC	12	Santiago Fernández	(substituted off) 58'
LW	11	Santiago Cordero
FH	10	Nicolás Sánchez
SH	9	Martín Landajo	(substituted off) 68'
N8	8	Juan Manuel Leguizamón (c)
OF	7	Julio Farías Cabello
BF	6	Pablo Matera	(substituted off) 54'
RL	5	Patricio Albacete
LL	4	Manuel Carizza	(substituted off) 65'
TP	3	Maximiliano Bustos	(substituted off) 73'
HK	2	Eusebio Guiñazú	(substituted off) 65'
LP	1	Marcos Ayerza	(substituted off) 72'
Replacements:
HK	16	Santiago Iglesias	(substituted on) 65'
PR	17	Nahuel Lobo	(substituted on) 72'
PR	18	Matías Díaz	(substituted on) 73'
LK	19	Tomás Lavanini	(substituted on) 65'
N8	20	Leonardo Senatore	(substituted on) 54'
SH	21	Tomás Cubelli	(substituted on) 68'
CE	22	Gabriel Ascárate	(substituted on) 58'
FB	23	Lucas González Amorosino	(substituted on) 40'
Coach:
(Argentina) Daniel Hourcade

Man of the Match:
Taulupe Faletau (Wales)

Touch judges:
Steve Walsh (Australia)
Lourens van der Merwe (South Africa)
Television match official:
Simon McDowell (Ireland)

Notes:

- Gethin Jenkins become the fourth Welsh player to earn 100 caps.
- Samson Lee and Cory Allen made their international debuts for Wales.
- Horacio Agulla earned his 50th cap for Argentina.
- This was Wales biggest winning margin over Argentina.

16 November 2013
18:00 CET (UTC+1)

France	38–18	Tonga
Try: Guitoune 5' m Chouly 40' c Dulin 50' c Kayser 73' c Con: Parra (2/3) 40', 52'; Michalak (1/1) 73'; Pen: Parra (4/4) 2', 17', 28', 63'	Report	Try: Vainikolo (2) 56' m, 80' c Con: Fosita (1/1) 80'; Pen: Apikotoa (2/4) 31', 38'

Stade Océane, Le Havre
Attendance: 19,968
Referee: Glen Jackson (New Zealand)

Team details

FB	15	Brice Dulin
RW	14	Sofiane Guitoune
OC	13	Gaël Fickou		23' to 28'
IC	12	Wesley Fofana				(substituted off) 66'
LW	11	Maxime Médard
FH	10	Rémi Talès		(substituted off) 65'
SH	9	Morgan Parra		(substituted off) 70'
N8	8	Damien Chouly
OF	7	Fulgence Ouedraogo		(substituted off) 15'
BF	6	Thierry Dusautoir (c)		(substituted off) 72'
RL	5	Yoann Maestri	(red card) 41'
LL	4	Sébastien Vahaamahina
TP	3	Nicolas Mas		(substituted off) 48'
HK	2	Dimitri Szarzewski		(substituted off) 48'
LP	1	Yannick Forestier		(substituted off) 48'
Replacements:
HK	16	Benjamin Kayser		(substituted on) 48'
PR	17	Vincent Debaty		(substituted on) 48'
PR	18	Rabah Slimani		(substituted on) 48'
LK	19	Pascal Papé		(substituted on) 72'
FL	20	Bernard Le Roux		(substituted on) 15'
SH	21	Jonathan Pélissié		(substituted on) 70'
FH	22	Frédéric Michalak		(substituted on) 65'
CE	23	Mathieu Bastareaud		(substituted on) 23'	(substituted off) 28'	(substituted on) 66'
Coach:
(France) Phillipe Saint-Andre

FB	15	Vunga Lilo		(substituted off) 72'
RW	14	Fetuʻu Vainikolo
OC	13	Siale Piutau
IC	12	Sione Piukala
LW	11	William Helu
FH	10	Fangatapu Apikotoa		(substituted off) 70'
SH	9	Taniela Moa	(yellow card) 40' to 50'	(substituted off) 63'
N8	8	Opeti Fonua		(substituted off) 48'
OF	7	Nili Latu (c)
BF	6	Sione Kalamafoni		(substituted off) 63'
RL	5	Joe Tuineau		(substituted off) 58'
LL	4	Tukulua Lokotui
TP	3	Tevita Mailau		(substituted off) 67'
HK	2	Elvis Taione		(substituted off) 58'
LP	1	Sona Taumalolo	(red card) 41'
Replacements:
HK	16	Ilaisa Maʻasi		(substituted on) 58'
PR	17	Taione Vea		(substituted on) 48'
PR	18	Sila Puafisi		(substituted on) 67'
N8	19	Viliami Maʻafu		(substituted on) 63'
FL	20	Hale T-Pole		(substituted on) 58'
SH	21	Samisoni Fisilau		(substituted on) 63'
FH	22	Latiume Fosita		(substituted on) 70'
WG	23	Tevita Halaifonua		(substituted on) 72'
Coach:
(Tonga) Mana Otai

Touch judges:
Wayne Barnes (England)
Juan Sylvestre (Argentina)
Television match official:
Alan Falzone (Italy)

Notes:

- Sofiane Guitoune and Jonathan Pélissié made their international debuts for France.

16 November 2013
19:00 EET (UTC+2)

Romania	21–20	Canada
Pen: Vlaicu (7/8) 9', 15', 21', 38', 57', 70', 80'	Report (In Romanian)	Try: Ardron 18' c Jones 48' c Con: Jones (2/2) 19', 49'; Pen: Jones (1/3) 42'; Pritchard (1/2) 76'

Stadionul Arcul de Triumf, Bucharest
Referee: Greg Garner (England)

Team details

FB	15	Cătălin Fercu
RW	14	Iulian Dumitraș
OC	13	Csaba Gál
IC	12	Florin Vlaicu
LW	11	Florin Ioniță
FH	10	Ciprian Căplescu
SH	9	Florin Surugiu	(substituted off) 61'
N8	8	Stelian Burcea	(substituted off) 49'
OF	7	Mihai Macovei (c)
BF	6	Viorel Lucaci
RL	5	Marius Sirbe
LL	4	Alin Coste	(substituted off) 67'
TP	3	Paulică Ion	(substituted off) 73'
HK	2	Otar Turashvili	(substituted off) 59'
LP	1	Mihai Lazăr	(substituted off) 71'
Replacements:
HK	16	Andrei Rădoi	(substituted on) 59'
PR	17	Constantin Pristăviță	(substituted on) 71'
PR	18	Horaţiu Pungea	(substituted on) 73'
LK	19	Valentin Popârlan	(substituted on) 67'
N8	20	Dorin Lazăr	(substituted on) 49'
CE	21	Robert Dascălu	(substituted on) 61'
CE	22	Cristian Dinis
FH	23	Gabriel Conache
Coach:
(Wales) Lynn Howells

FB	15	Matt Evans
RW	14	Jeff Hassler
OC	13	Ciaran Hearn
IC	12	Nick Blevins	(substituted off) 73'
LW	11	Phil Mackenzie	(substituted off) 61'
FH	10	Harry Jones
SH	9	Phil Mack
N8	8	Tyler Ardron (c)
OF	7	Nanyak Dala
BF	6	Jebb Sinclair	(substituted off) 69'
RL	5	Brett Beukeboom	(substituted off) 67'
LL	4	Tyler Hotson
TP	3	Andrew Tiedemann
HK	2	Benoît Piffero
LP	1	Hubert Buydens
Replacements:
HK	16	Ryan March
PR	17	Djustice Sears-Duru
PR	18	Jake Illnicki
FL	19	Adam Kleeberger	(substituted on) 67'
LK	20	Jon Phelan	(substituted on) 69'
SH	21	Jamie Mackenzie
WG	22	James Pritchard	(substituted on) 61'
CE	23	Conor Trainor	(substituted on) 74'
Coach:
(New Zealand) Kieran Crowley

Touch judges:
Marius Mitrea (Italy)
Giuseppe Vivarini (Italy)
Television match official:
Jim Yuille (Scotland)

16 November 2013
17:45 WET (UTC+0)

Ireland	15–32	Australia
Pen: Sexton (4/5) 12', 29', 33', 39'; Madigan (1/1) 56'	Report	Try: Cummins 17' c Hooper (2) 23' m, 66' c Cooper 45' c Con: Cooper (3/4) 18', 47', 68'; Pen: Cooper (2/3) 8', 49'

Aviva Stadium, Dublin
Attendance: 51,000
Referee: Chris Pollock (New Zealand)

Team details

FB	15	Rob Kearney			(substituted off) 73'
RW	14	Tommy Bowe
OC	13	Brian O'Driscoll	22' to 29'
IC	12	Luke Marshall
LW	11	Fergus McFadden
FH	10	Johnny Sexton	(substituted off) 40'
SH	9	Eoin Reddan	(substituted off) 56'
N8	8	Jamie Heaslip
OF	7	Seán O'Brien	(substituted off) 70'
BF	6	Peter O'Mahony
RL	5	Paul O'Connell (c)
LL	4	Devin Toner	(substituted off) 68'
TP	3	Mike Ross	(substituted off) 65'
HK	2	Rory Best	(substituted off) 65'
LP	1	Cian Healy	(substituted off) 68'
Replacements:
HK	16	Seán Cronin	(substituted on) 65'
PR	17	Jack McGrath	(substituted on) 68'
PR	18	Stephen Archer	(substituted on) 65'
LK	19	Mike McCarthy	(substituted on) 68'
FL	20	Kevin McLaughlin	(substituted on) 70'
SH	21	Conor Murray	(substituted on) 56'
FH	22	Ian Madigan	(substituted on) 40'
CE	23	Robbie Henshaw	(substituted on) 22'	(substituted off) 29'	(substituted on) 73'
Coach:
(New Zealand) Joe Schmidt

FB	15	Israel Folau
RW	14	Adam Ashley-Cooper		(substituted off) 57'
OC	13	Tevita Kuridrani	(red card) 72'
IC	12	Matt To'omua
LW	11	Nick Cummins
FH	10	Quade Cooper		(substituted off) 68'
SH	9	Will Genia		(substituted off) 65'
N8	8	Ben Mowen (c)
OF	7	Michael Hooper	(yellow card) 32' to 42'	(substituted off) 72'
BF	6	Scott Fardy
RL	5	James Horwill		(substituted off) 56'
LL	4	Rob Simmons
TP	3	Sekope Kepu		(substituted off) 65'
HK	2	Stephen Moore		(substituted off) 68'
LP	1	James Slipper		(substituted off) 68'
Replacements:
HK	16	Tatafu Polota-Nau		(substituted on) 68'
PR	17	Benn Robinson		(substituted on) 68'
PR	18	Paddy Ryan		(substituted on) 65'
LK	19	Sitaleki Timani		(substituted on) 56'
FL	20	Liam Gill		(substituted on) 72'
SH	21	Nic White		(substituted on) 65'
CE	22	Christian Lealiifano		(substituted on) 68'
WG	23	Joe Tomane		(substituted on) 57'
Coach:
(Australia) Ewen McKenzie

Man of the Match:
Michael Hooper (Australia)

Touch judges:
Romain Poite (France)
Stuart Berry (South Africa)
Television match official:
Geoff Warren (England)

Notes:

- Australia retained the Lansdowne Cup.

16 November 2013
16:30 UYST (UTC-3)

Uruguay	16–15	Spain
Try: Mieres 73' c Con: Ormaechea (1/1) 74'; Pen: Ormaechea (3/4) 7', 14', 54'	Report	Try: Auzqui 39' c Feijoo 46' m Con: Genua (1/2) 40'; Pen: Genua (1/1) 16'

Estadio Charrúa, Montevideo
Referee: Chris Assmus (Canada)

Team details

FB	15	Gastón Mieres
RW	14	Santiago Gibernau
OC	13	Andrés Vilaseca
IC	12	Alberto Román	(substituted off) 51'
LW	11	Jerónimo Etcheverry
FH	10	Felipe Berchesi
SH	9	Agustín Ormaechea
N8	8	Diego Magno
OF	7	Juan de Freitas
BF	6	Juan Manuel Gaminara
RL	5	Santiago Vilaseca	(substituted off) 69'
LL	4	Franco Lamanna	(substituted off) 48'
TP	3	Mario Sagario	(substituted off) 55'
HK	2	Nicolás Klappenbach (c)	(substituted off) 68'
LP	1	Alejo Corral	(substituted off) 55'
Replacements:
PR	16	Arturo Ávalo	(substituted on) 55'
PR	17	Francisco Jiménez	(substituted on) 55'
HK	18	Rodolfo De Mula	(substituted on) 67'
LK	19	Mathias Palomeque	(substituted on) 69'
FL	20	Alejandro Nieto	(substituted on) 48'
FL	21	Fernando Bascou
FH	22	Alejo Durán
CE	23	Joaquín Prada	(substituted on) 51'
Coach:
(Uruguay) Pablo Lemoine

FB	15	César Sempere
RW	14	Marcos Poggi
OC	13	Ignacio Contardi
IC	12	Javier Canosa
LW	11	Matías Tudela	(substituted off) 64'
FH	10	Igor Genua
SH	9	Pablo Feijoo (c)
N8	8	Federico Negrillo	(substituted off) 55'
OF	7	Glen Rolls	(substituted off) 75'
BF	6	Gauthier Gibouin
RL	5	Matthew Cook	(substituted off) 48'
LL	4	Jesús Recuerda
TP	3	Jesús Moreno	(substituted off) 48'
HK	2	Fabien Rofes	(substituted off) 55'
LP	1	Beñat Auzqui	(substituted off) 64'
Replacements:
PR	16	Ion Insausti	(substituted on) 55'
PR	17	Joe Hutchinson	(substituted on) 48'
FL	18	Alejandro Blanco	(substituted on) 75'
LK	19	Anibal Bonán	(substituted on) 48'
FL	20	Adam Newton	(substituted on) 55'
SH	21	Ignacio Villanueva
FB	22	Nil Baró	(substituted on) 64'
PR	23	Agustín Ortíz	(substituted on) 74'
Coach:
(Spain) Santiago Santos

Touch judges:
Carlos Poggi (Argentina)
Martín Rodríguez (Argentina)

17 November 2013
15:00 GMT (UTC+0)

Scotland	0–28	South Africa
	Report	Try: Alberts 4' c Le Roux 29' c Pietersen 31' c Oosthuizen 52' c Con: Lambie (4/4) 5', 30', 32', 54'

Murrayfield, Edinburgh
Attendance: 49,278
Referee: Jérôme Garcès (France)

Team details

FB	15	Sean Maitland
RW	14	Tommy Seymour	(substituted off) 64'
OC	13	Nick De Luca
IC	12	Duncan Taylor
LW	11	Sean Lamont
FH	10	Ruaridh Jackson	(substituted off) 55'
SH	9	Greig Laidlaw (c)	(substituted off) 68'
N8	8	David Denton
OF	7	John Barclay	(substituted off) 64'
BF	6	Alasdair Strokosch
RL	5	Jim Hamilton
LL	4	Richie Gray	(substituted off) 61'
TP	3	Moray Low
HK	2	Ross Ford	(substituted off) 55'
LP	1	Alasdair Dickinson	(substituted off) 55'
Replacements:
HK	16	Scott Lawson	(substituted on) 55'
PR	17	Ryan Grant	(substituted on) 55'
PR	18	Geoff Cross
LK	19	Jonny Gray	(substituted on) 61'
N8	20	Johnnie Beattie	(substituted on) 64'
SH	21	Chris Cusiter	(substituted on) 68'
FH	22	Duncan Weir	(substituted on) 55'
WG	23	Max Evans	(substituted on) 64'
Coach:
(Australia) Scott Johnson

FB	15	Willie le Roux
RW	14	JP Pietersen
OC	13	Jaque Fourie
IC	12	Jean de Villiers (c)
LW	11	Bryan Habana
FH	10	Pat Lambie		(substituted off) 70'
SH	9	Fourie du Preez		(substituted off) 64'
N8	8	Duane Vermeulen
OF	7	Willem Alberts		(substituted off) 40'
BF	6	Francois Louw		(substituted off) 75'
RL	5	Flip van der Merwe
LL	4	Bakkies Botha		(substituted off) 59'
TP	3	Frans Malherbe		(substituted off) 36'
HK	2	Adriaan Strauss		(substituted off) 60'
LP	1	Gurthrö Steenkamp		(substituted off) 56'
Replacements:
HK	16	Bismarck du Plessis		(substituted on) 60'
PR	17	Tendai Mtawarira		(substituted on) 56'
PR	18	Coenie Oosthuizen		(substituted on) 36'
LK	19	Eben Etzebeth		(substituted on) 59'
FL	20	Marcell Coetzee	(yellow card) 70' to 80'	(substituted on) 40'
SH	21	Ruan Pienaar		(substituted on) 64'
FH	22	Morné Steyn		(substituted on) 75'
CE	23	JJ Engelbrecht		(substituted on) 70'
Coach:
(South Africa) Heyneke Meyer

Man of the Match:
Willie le Roux (South Africa)

Touch judges:
Pascal Gaüzère (France)
Dudley Phillips (Ireland)
Television match official:
Marshall Kilgore (Ireland)

Notes:

- Jonny Gray made his international debut for Scotland.
- JP Pietersen earned his 50th test cap for South Africa.

=== 22–24 November ===
22 November 2013
19:30 GMT (UTC+0)

Wales	17–7	Tonga
Try: O. Williams 16' c Beck 25' c Con: Halfpenny (2/2) 16', 25'; Pen: Halfpenny (1/1) 14'	Report	Try: Helu 34' c Con: Fosita (1/1) 34'

Millennium Stadium, Cardiff
Attendance: 46,523
Referee: Mike Fraser (New Zealand)

Team details

FB	15	Leigh Halfpenny
RW	14	George North
OC	13	Owen Williams
IC	12	Ashley Beck
LW	11	Hallam Amos
FH	10	James Hook	(substituted off) 69'
SH	9	Lloyd Williams	(substituted off) 69'
N8	8	Ryan Jones (c)
OF	7	Justin Tipuric
BF	6	Dan Lydiate
RL	5	Ian Evans	(substituted off) 69'
LL	4	Luke Charteris
TP	3	Rhodri Jones	(substituted off) 69'
HK	2	Ken Owens	(substituted off) 69'
LP	1	Paul James	(substituted off) 69'
Replacements:
HK	16	Emyr Phillips	(substituted on) 69'
PR	17	Ryan Bevington	(substituted on) 69'
PR	18	Samson Lee	(substituted on) 69'
LK	19	Alun Wyn Jones	(substituted on) 69'
FL	20	Sam Warburton
SH	21	Rhodri Williams	(substituted on) 69'
FH	22	Rhys Priestland	(substituted on) 69'
FB	23	Jordan Williams
Coach:
(New Zealand) Warren Gatland

FB	15	Vunga Lilo	(substituted off) 71'
RW	14	Fetuʻu Vainikolo
OC	13	Siale Piutau
IC	12	Mataʻali Paea
LW	11	William Helu
FH	10	Latiume Fosita	(substituted off) 76'
SH	9	Taniela Moa	(substituted off) 51'
N8	8	Viliami Maʻafu	(substituted off) 41'
OF	7	Nili Latu (c)
BF	6	Sione Kalamafoni	(substituted off) 51'
RL	5	Joe Tuineau
LL	4	Tukulua Lokotui
TP	3	Sila Puafisi	(substituted off) 51'
HK	2	Elvis Taione	(substituted off) 62'
LP	1	Eddie Aholelei	(substituted off) 51'
Replacements:
HK	16	Suliasi Taufalele	(substituted on) 62'
PR	17	Taione Vea	(substituted on) 51'
PR	18	Tevita Mailau	(substituted on) 51'
FL	19	Hale T-Pole	(substituted on) 46'
LK	20	Opeti Fonua	(substituted on) 41'
SH	21	Samisoni Fisilau	(substituted on) 51'
FH	22	Fangatapu Apikotoa	(substituted on) 76'
WG	23	Tevita Halaifonua	(substituted on) 71'
Coach:
(Tonga) Mana Otai

Man of the Match:
Luke Charteris (Wales)

Touch judges:
Craig Joubert (South Africa)
Luke Pearce (England)
Television match official:
Carlo Damasco (Italy)

Notes:

- Hallam Amos and Rhodri Williams made their international debuts for Wales.
- Wales head coach Warren Gatland coached his 100th international game; 59 for Wales, 38 for Ireland and 3 for the British and Irish Lions.

23 November 2013
16:30 GET (UTC+4)

Georgia	16–15	Samoa
Try: Sharikadze 42' c Con: Kvirikashvili (1/1) 42'; Pen: Kvirikashvili (3/5) 6', 19', 78'	Report	Try: Leiua 13' m Lam 26' c Con: T. Pisi (1/2) 28'; Pen: T. Pisi (1/2) 69'

Mikheil Meskhi Stadium, Tbilisi
Attendance: 28,578
Referee: Romain Poite (France)

Team details

FB	15	Merab Kvirikashvili
RW	14	Tamaz Mchedlidze		(substituted off) 49'
OC	13	Davit Kacharava
IC	12	Merab Sharikadze
LW	11	Giorgi Shkinin		(substituted off) 67'
FH	10	Lasha Malaghuradze
SH	9	Giorgi Begadze
N8	8	Giorgi Chkhaidze
OF	7	Mamuka Gorgodze (c)	(yellow card) 16' to 26'
BF	6	Giorgi Tkhilaishvili		(substituted off) 70'
RL	5	Levan Datunashvili
LL	4	Kote Mikautadze		(substituted off) 59'
TP	3	Levan Chilachava		(substituted off) 40'
HK	2	Shalva Mamukashvili		(substituted off) 68'
LP	1	Mikheil Nariashvili		(substituted off) 67'
Replacements:
HK	16	Simon Maisuradze		(substituted on) 68'
PR	17	Zurab Zhvania		(substituted on) 67'
PR	18	Davit Kubriashvili		(substituted on) 40'
LK	19	Giorgi Nemsadze		(substituted on) 59'
FL	20	Shalva Sutiashvili		(substituted on) 70'
SH	21	Vazha Khutsishvili
CE	22	Tedo Zibzibadze		(substituted on) 49'
FB	23	Beka Tsiklauri		(substituted on) 67'
Coach:
(New Zealand) Milton Haig

FB	15	Fa'atoina Autagavaia
RW	14	Alapati Leiua
OC	13	Isaia Tuifua
IC	12	Johnny Leota		(substituted off) 59'
LW	11	Brando Va'aulu		(substituted off) 40'
FH	10	Tusi Pisi
SH	9	Kahn Fotuali'i (c)		(substituted off) 70'
N8	8	Faifili Levave
OF	7	Jack Lam
BF	6	Ofisa Treviranus		(substituted off) 50'
RL	5	Filo Paulo
LL	4	Piula Faasalele	(yellow card) 47' to 57'	(substituted off) 57'
TP	3	James Johnston		(substituted off) 63'
HK	2	Ti'i Paulo		(substituted off) 70'
LP	1	Sakaria Taulafo
Replacements:
HK	16	Ole Avei		(substituted on) 70'
PR	17	Viliamu Afatia
PR	18	Anthony Perenise		(substituted on) 63'
LK	24	Joe Tekori		(substituted on) 57'
FL	20	Taiasina Tuifu'a
SH	21	Jeremy Su'a		(substituted on) 70'
WG	22	Sinoti Sinoti		(substituted on) 40'
WG	23	Ken Pisi		(substituted on) 59'
Coach:
(Samoa) Stephen Betham

Man of the Match:
Mamuka Gorgodze (Georgia)

Touch judges:
Andrew Mcmenemy (Scotland)
Vlad Iordachescu (Romania)
Television match official:
Eric Gauzins (France)

Notes:

- First ever win for Georgia over Samoa.

23 November 2013
15:00 CET (UTC+1)

Italy	14–19	Argentina
Try: Campagnaro 62' m Pen: Allan (3/7) 4', 17', 24'	Report	Try: Imhoff 20' c Con: Sánchez (1/1) 21'; Pen: Sánchez (3/4) 33', 54', 67'; Drop: Sánchez 72'

Stadio Olimpico, Rome
Attendance: 37,315
Referee: Chris Pollock (New Zealand)

Team details

FB	15	Luke McLean
RW	14	Giovanbattista Venditti
OC	13	Michele Campagnaro
IC	12	Gonzalo Canale	(substituted off) 79'
LW	11	Tommaso Iannone
FH	10	Tommaso Allan	(substituted off) 65'
SH	9	Edoardo Gori	(substituted off) 71'
N8	8	Sergio Parisse (c)
OF	7	Robert Barbieri
BF	6	Alessandro Zanni
RL	5	Valerio Bernabò	(substituted off) 54'
LL	4	Quintin Geldenhuys	(substituted off) 71'
TP	3	Martin Castrogiovanni	(substituted off) 65'
HK	2	Leonardo Ghiraldini	(substituted off) 71'
LP	1	Michele Rizzo	(substituted off) 65'
Replacements:
HK	16	Davide Giazzon	(substituted on) 71'
PR	17	Matías Agüero	(substituted on) 65'
PR	18	Lorenzo Cittadini	(substituted on) 65'
LK	19	Marco Bortolami	(substituted on) 54'
LK	20	Joshua Furno	(substituted on) 71'
SH	21	Tobias Botes	(substituted on) 71'
FH	22	Luciano Orquera	(substituted on) 65'
WG	23	Tommaso Benvenuti	(substituted on) 79'
Coach:
(France) Jacques Brunel

FB	15	Joaquín Tuculet		(substituted off) 56'
RW	14	Lucas González Amorosino
OC	13	Horacio Agulla
IC	12	Gabriel Ascárate		(substituted off) 70'
LW	11	Juan Imhoff
FH	10	Nicolás Sánchez
SH	9	Martín Landajo		(substituted off) 65'
N8	8	Benjamín Macome		(substituted off) 65'	(substituted on) 70'
OF	7	Julio Farías Cabello		(substituted off) 60'
BF	6	Juan Manuel Leguizamón (c)
RL	5	Mariano Galarza
LL	4	Manuel Carizza		(substituted off) 74'
TP	3	Maximiliano Bustos
HK	2	Eusebio Guiñazú
LP	1	Marcos Ayerza	(yellow card) 60' to 70'
Replacements:
HK	16	Santiago Iglesias
PR	17	Nahuel Lobo		(substituted on) 65'	(substituted off) 70'
PR	18	Matías Díaz
LK	19	Tomás Lavanini		(substituted on) 74'
FL	20	Pablo Matera		(substituted on) 60'
SH	21	Tomás Cubelli		(substituted on) 65'
CE	22	Javier Rojas		(substituted on) 70'
FB	23	Santiago Cordero		(substituted on) 56'
Coach:
(Argentina) Daniel Hourcade

Touch judges:
George Clancy (Ireland)
JP Doyle (England)
Television match official:
Gareth Simmonds (Wales)

23 November 2013
15:00 GMT (UTC+0)

Russia	7–28	United States
Try: Garbuzov 52' c Con: Gaisin (1/1) 53'	Report	Try: Wyles 19' c Manoa 30' m Dolan 79' c Con: Siddall (2/3) 20', 80'; Pen: Siddall (3/3) 41', 43', 49'

Barnet Copthall, London, England
Referee: Marius Mitrea (Italy)

Team details

FB	15	Ramil Gaisin
RW	14	Vasily Artemyev
OC	13	Igor Galinovsky
IC	12	Dimitry Gerasimov
LW	11	Vladimir Ostroushko
FH	10	Sergey Sugrobov
SH	9	Anton Ryabov
N8	8	Viktor Gresev
OF	7	Pavel Butenko
BF	6	Alexander Khudiakov
RL	5	Andrei Garbuzov
LL	4	Alexander Voytov (c)
TP	3	Evgeni Pronenko
HK	2	Valery Tsnobiladze
LP	1	Grigory Tsnobiladze
Replacements:
HK	16	Vladislav Korshunov
PR	17	Aleksey Volkov
PR	18	Innokenty Zykov
LK	19	Denis Antonov
FL	20	Artem Fatakhov
FH	21	Yuri Kushnarev
WG	22	Andrey Otrokov
FB	23	Denis Simplikevich
Coach:
(Wales) Kingsley Jones

FB	15	Chris Wyles
RW	14	Blaine Scully
OC	13	Folau Niua
IC	12	Andrew Suniula
LW	11	Tim Maupin
FH	10	Adam Siddall
SH	9	Robbie Shaw
N8	8	Cam Dolan
OF	7	Scott LaValla
BF	6	Todd Clever (c)
RL	5	Samu Manoa
LL	4	Tai Tuisamoa
TP	3	Titi Lamositele
HK	2	Phil Thiel
LP	1	Nicholas Wallace
Replacements:
HK	16	Zach Fenoglio
PR	17	Olive Kilifi
PR	18	Eric Fry
LK	19	Graham Harriman
FL	20	Derek Asbun
SH	21	Shaun Davies
CE	22	Seamus Kelly
WG	23	Luke Hume
Coach:
(United States) Mike Tolkin

Touch judges:
RFU Appt (England)
RFU Appt (England)

23 November 2013
15:00 WET (UTC+0)

Portugal	8–52	Canada
Try: M. Leal 62' m Pen: P. Leal (1/1) 30'	Report	Try: Hearn (2) 10' c, 56' c Pritchard (2) 21' c, 40' m Blevins 52' c Braid 66' m Paris 70' m Con: Pritchard (4/7) 11', 22', 53', 58'; Pen: Pritchard (3/3) 28', 33', 47'

Universitário Lisboa, Lisbon
Attendance: 2,829
Referee: Ian Davies (Wales)

Team details

FB	15	Pedro Leal
RW	14	Gonçalo Foro
OC	13	Pedro Bettencourt
IC	12	Miguel Leal	(substituted off) 40'
LW	11	Frederico Oliveira	(substituted off) 61'
FH	10	Francisco Almeida
SH	9	Francisco Magalhães	(substituted off) 40'
N8	8	Vasco Uva
OF	7	António Duarte
BF	6	Fernando Almeida	(substituted off) 40'
RL	5	Gonçalo Uva
LL	4	Rafael Simões	(substituted off) 44'
TP	3	Jorge Segurado	(substituted off) 58'
HK	2	João Correia (c)	(substituted off) 67'
LP	1	Bruno Medeiros	(substituted off) 71'
Replacements:
PR	16	João Almeida	(substituted on) 71'
PR	17	Bruno Rocha	(substituted on) 58'
HK	18	Francisco Tavares	(substituted on) 67'
LK	19	Luís Portela	(substituted on) 40'
FL	20	Eric dos Santos	(substituted on) 44'
FB	21	Nuno Penha e Costa	(substituted on) 40'
CE	22	Francisco Appleton	(substituted on) 40'
WG	23	Aderito Esteves	(substituted on) 61'
Coach:
(Portugal) Frederico Sousa

FB	15	James Pritchard
RW	14	Conor Trainor
OC	13	Ciaran Hearn	(substituted off) 68'
IC	12	Nick Blevins
LW	11	Taylor Paris
FH	10	Harry Jones	(substituted off) 56'
SH	9	Phil Mack	(substituted off) 47'
N8	8	Adam Kleeberger
OF	7	Nanyak Dala
BF	6	John Moonlight	(substituted off) 48'
RL	5	Tyler Hotson
LL	4	Jon Phelan	(substituted off) 54'
TP	3	Andrew Tiedemann	(substituted off) 46'
HK	2	Ray Barkwill	(substituted off) 60'
LP	1	Hubert Buydens (c)	(substituted off) 73'
Replacements:
HK	16	Benoît Piffero	(substituted on) 60'
PR	17	Djustice Sears-Duru	(substituted on) 73'
PR	18	Jake Illnicki	(substituted on) 46'
LK	19	Brett Beukeboom	(substituted on) 54'
FL	20	Kyle Gilmour	(substituted on) 48'
SH	21	Jamie Mackenzie	(substituted on) 47'
CE	22	Pat Parfrey	(substituted on) 68'
FH	23	Connor Braid	(substituted on) 56'
Coach:
(New Zealand) Kieran Crowley

Touch judges:
Sean Brickell (Wales)
Wayne Davies (Wales)

23 November 2013
16:00 CET (UTC+1)

Spain	7–40	Japan
Try: Sempere 35' c Con: Garcia (1/1) 37'; Pen: Garcia 0/1	Report	Try: Horie 46' m Broadhurst (2) 59' c, 63' c Hirose 69' m Con: Goromaru (1/4) 64'; Pen: Goromaru (6/7) 2', 6', 10', 23', 39', 54'

Estadio Nacional Complutense, Madrid
Attendance: 6,000
Referee: Joaquín Montes (Uruguay)

Team details

FB	15	César Sempere
RW	14	Sebastien Ascarate
OC	13	Martín Heredia
IC	12	Jaime Nava
LW	11	Ignacio Contardi		(substituted off) 54'
FH	10	Mariano Garcia
SH	9	Pablo Feijoo (c)		(substituted off) 61'
N8	8	Gauthier Gibouin
OF	7	Matthew Cook	(yellow card) 58' to 68'
BF	6	Glen Rolls		(substituted off) 54'
RL	5	David Barrera
LL	4	Alejandro Blanco
TP	3	Agustín Ortíz		(substituted off) 67'
HK	2	Juan Anaya		(substituted off) 56'
LP	1	Frank Labbe		(substituted off) 59'	(substituted on) 68'	(substituted off) 72'
Replacements:
PR	16	Anthony Pradalie		(substituted on) 59'	68' to 72'
PR	17	Xabier Garmendia		(substituted on) 67'
LK	18	Ignacio Villanueva
FL	19	Adam Newton		(substituted on) 54'
WG	20	Matias Tudela		(substituted on) 61'
CE	21	Javier Canosa
SH	22	Igor Genua		(substituted on) 54'
HK	23	Unai Lasa		(substituted on) 56'
Coach:
(Spain) Santiago Santos

FB	15	Ayumu Goromaru
RW	14	Toshiaki Hirose (c)
OC	13	Male Sa'u
IC	12	Yuu Tamura		(substituted off) 54'
LW	11	Akihito Yamada		(substituted off) 76'
FH	10	Kosei Ono
SH	9	Fumiaki Tanaka		(substituted off) 47'
N8	8	Takashi Kikutani		(substituted off) 44'	(substituted on) 53'	(substituted off) 62'
OF	7	Michael Broadhurst
BF	6	Hendrik Tui
RL	5	Luke Thompson	(yellow card) 32' to 42'
LL	4	Hitoshi Ono		(substituted off) 52'
TP	3	Hiroshi Yamashita		(substituted off) 47'
HK	2	Shota Horie		(substituted off) 76'
LP	1	Hisateru Hirashima	(yellow card) 43' to 53'			(substituted off) 67'
Replacements:
HK	16	Hiroki Yuhara		(substituted on) 76'
PR	17	Masataka Mikami		(substituted on) 44'	(substituted off) 53'	(substituted on) 67'
PR	18	Kensuke Hatakeyama		(substituted on) 47'
LK	19	Shinya Makabe		(substituted on) 52'
LK	20	Justin Ives				(substituted on) 62'
SH	21	Atsushi Hiwasa		(substituted on) 47'
CE	22	Seiichi Shimomura		(substituted on) 54'
WG	23	Yuta Imamura		(substituted on) 76'
Coach:
(Australia) Scott Wisemantel

Touch judges:
Tual Trainini (France)
David Rosich (France)

23 November 2013
19:00 EET (UTC+2)

Romania	7–26	Fiji
Try: Penalty try 30' c Con: Vlaicu (1/1) 31'	Report (In Romanian)	Try: Talebula 13' m Nadolo 18' m Nagusa 41' c Con: Bai (1/3) 42'; Pen: Bai (2/2) 38', 40'; Nadolo (1/1) 77'

Stadionul Arcul de Triumf, Bucharest
Referee: Dudley Phillips (Ireland)

Team details

FB	15	Cătălin Fercu
RW	14	Ionuț Dumitru
OC	13	Robert Dascălu
IC	12	Csaba Gál
LW	11	Florin Ioniță
FH	10	Florin Vlaicu
SH	9	Valentin Calafeteanu
N8	8	Mihai Macovei (c)
OF	7	Viorel Lucaci
BF	6	Alexandru Mitu
RL	5	Marius Sirbe
LL	4	Valentin Popârlan
TP	3	Paulică Ion
HK	2	Otar Turashvili
LP	1	Mihai Lazăr
Replacements:
HK	16	Andrei Rădoi
PR	17	Constantin Pristăviță
PR	18	Horaţiu Pungea
LK	19	Alin Coste
FL	20	Dorin Lazăr
SH	21	Florin Surugiu
FH	22	Stephen Hihetah
CE	23	Cristian Dinis
Coach:
(Wales) Lynn Howells

FB	15	Metuisela Talebula
RW	14	Timoci Nagusa
OC	13	Asaeli Tikoirotuma
IC	12	Nemani Nadolo	(yellow card) 61' to 71'
LW	11	Napolioni Nalaga
FH	10	Seremaia Bai
SH	9	Nemia Kenatale
N8	8	Sakiusa Matadigo
OF	7	Akapusi Qera (c)
BF	6	Malakai Ravulo
RL	5	Apisai Naikatini
LL	4	Wame Lewaravu
TP	3	Setefano Somoca
HK	2	Seremaia Naureure
LP	1	Jerry Yanuyanutawa
Replacements:
HK	16	Peni Ravai
PR	17	Campese Ma'afu
PR	18	Manasa Saulo
LK	19	Sam Matavesi
N8	20	Nemani Nagusa
SH	21	Henry Seniloli
FH	22	Waisea Luveniyali
WG	23	Malakai Bakaniceva
Coach:
(Fiji) Inoke Male

Touch judges:
Sean Gallagher (Ireland)
John Carvill (Ireland)
Television match official:
Simon McDowell (Ireland)

23 November 2013
18:00 GMT (UTC+0)

Scotland	15–21	Australia
Pen: Laidlaw (5/6) 5', 10', 29', 36', 48'	Report	Try: Folau 26' c Feauai-Sautia 43' m Con: Lealiifano (1/2) 27'; Pen: Lealiifano (3/7) 2', 22', 50'

Murrayfield Stadium, Edinburgh
Attendance: 56,732
Referee: Jaco Peyper (South Africa)

Team details

FB	15	Sean Maitland
RW	14	Tommy Seymour
OC	13	Nick De Luca
IC	12	Duncan Taylor	(substituted off) 65'
LW	11	Sean Lamont
FH	10	Duncan Weir
SH	9	Greig Laidlaw	(substituted off) 58'
N8	8	David Denton	(substituted off) 60'
OF	7	Kelly Brown (c)
BF	6	Johnnie Beattie
RL	5	Jim Hamilton
LL	4	Grant Gilchrist	(substituted off) 65'
TP	3	Moray Low	(substituted off) 50'
HK	2	Ross Ford	(substituted off) 20'
LP	1	Ryan Grant	(substituted off) 46'
Replacements:
HK	16	Pat MacArthur	(substituted on) 20'
PR	17	Alasdair Dickinson	(substituted on) 46'
PR	18	Euan Murray	(substituted on) 50'
LK	19	Jonny Gray	(substituted on) 65'
FL	20	Kieran Low	(substituted on) 60'
SH	21	Chris Cusiter	(substituted on) 58'
FH	22	Ruaridh Jackson
WG	23	Max Evans	(substituted on) 65'
Coach:
(Australia) Scott Johnson

FB	15	Israel Folau
RW	14	Joe Tomane
OC	13	Christian Lealiifano
IC	12	Mike Harris
LW	11	Chris Feauai-Sautia
FH	10	Quade Cooper
SH	9	Will Genia		(substituted off) 65'
N8	8	Ben Mowen (c)
OF	7	Michael Hooper
BF	6	Scott Fardy		(substituted off) 75'
RL	5	James Horwill		(substituted off) 58'
LL	4	Rob Simmons	(yellow card) 47' to 57'
TP	3	Sekope Kepu		(substituted off) 58'
HK	2	Stephen Moore		(substituted off) 76'
LP	1	James Slipper
Replacements:
HK	16	Saia Fainga'a		(substituted on) 76'
PR	17	Ben Alexander		(substituted on) 58'
PR	18	Paddy Ryan
LK	19	Sitaleki Timani		(substituted on) 58'
FL	20	Ben McCalman		(substituted on) 75'
SH	21	Nic White		(substituted on) 65'
SH	22	Nick Phipps
FB	23	Bernard Foley
Coach:
(Australia) Ewen McKenzie

Man of the Match:
Israel Folau (Australia)

Touch judges:
Pascal Gauzère (France)
Francisco Pastrana (Argentina)
Television match official:
Geoff Warren (England)

Notes:

- Kieran Low made his international debut for Scotland.
- Jim Hamilton earned his 50th test cap for Scotland.
- Australia reclaimed the Hopetoun Cup for the first time since 2006 after losing it in 2009 and having been unable to reclaim it in 2012.

23 November 2013
21:00 CET (UTC+1)

France	10–19	South Africa
Try: Huget 40' c Con: Parra (1/1) 40'; Pen: Doussain (1/1) 73'	Report	Try: Pietersen 2' c Con: Steyn (1/1) 2'; Pen: Steyn (3/3) 26', 38', 59'; Pat Lambie (1/1) 78'

Stade de France, Saint-Denis
Attendance: 75,600
Referee: Wayne Barnes (England)

Team details

FB	15	Brice Dulin
RW	14	Yoann Huget
OC	13	Florian Fritz		(substituted off) 59'
IC	12	Wesley Fofana
LW	11	Sofiane Guitoune
FH	10	Rémi Talès		(substituted off) 74'
SH	9	Morgan Parra		(substituted off) 66'
N8	8	Damien Chouly
OF	7	Wenceslas Lauret		(substituted off) 69'
BF	6	Thierry Dusautoir (c)			(substituted off) 71'	(substituted on) 78'
RL	5	Yoann Maestri		(substituted off) 50'
LL	4	Pascal Papé
TP	3	Nicolas Mas		(substituted off) 56'
HK	2	Benjamin Kayser		(substituted off) 46'
LP	1	Yannick Forestier		(substituted off) 40'	(substituted on) 71'	(substituted off) 78'
Replacements:
HK	16	Dimitri Szarzewski		(substituted on) 46'
PR	17	Thomas Domingo	(yellow card) 67' to 77'	(substituted on) 40'
PR	18	Rabah Slimani		(substituted on) 56'
LK	19	Sébastien Vahaamahina		(substituted on) 50'
FL	20	Yannick Nyanga		(substituted on) 69'
SH	21	Jean-Marc Doussain		(substituted on) 66'
FH	22	Frédéric Michalak		(substituted on) 74'
CE	23	Mathieu Bastareaud		(substituted on) 59'
Coach:
(France) Phillipe Saint-Andre

FB	15	Willie le Roux		56' to 60'
RW	14	JP Pietersen
OC	13	Jaque Fourie
IC	12	Jean de Villiers (c)
LW	11	Bryan Habana
FH	10	Morné Steyn				(substituted off) 71'
SH	9	Ruan Pienaar
N8	8	Duane Vermeulen
OF	7	Willem Alberts		(substituted off) 67'
BF	6	Francois Louw	(yellow card) 72' to 80'
RL	5	Flip van der Merwe
LL	4	Eben Etzebeth		(substituted off) 15'
TP	3	Coenie Oosthuizen		(substituted off) 73'
HK	2	Bismarck du Plessis		(substituted off) 66'
LP	1	Tendai Mtawarira		(substituted off) 56'
Replacements:
HK	16	Adriaan Strauss		(substituted on) 66'
PR	17	Gurthrö Steenkamp		(substituted on) 56'
PR	18	Lourens Adriaanse		(substituted on) 73'
LK	19	Bakkies Botha		(substituted on) 15'	(substituted off) 74'
FL	20	Pieter-Steph du Toit		(substituted on) 67'
FL	21	Siya Kolisi			(substituted on) 74'
SH	22	Jano Vermaak
FH	23	Pat Lambie		(substituted on) 56'	(substituted off) 60'	(substituted on) 71'
Coach:
(South Africa) Heyneke Meyer

Touch judges:
Glen Jackson (New Zealand)
Leighton Hodges (Wales)
Television match official:
Iain Ramage (Scotland)

24 November 2013
14:00 WET (UTC+0)

Ireland	22–24	New Zealand
Try: Murray 4' c Best 10' c R. Kearney 17' m Con: Sexton (2/3) 5', 11'; Pen: Sexton (1/2) 33'	Report	Try: Savea 25' c B. Franks 64' c Crotty 80+2'; Con: Cruden (3/3) 26', 65', 80+3'; Pen: Cruden (1/2) 52'

Aviva Stadium, Dublin
Attendance: 51,000
Referee: Nigel Owens (Wales)

Team details

FB	15	Rob Kearney
RW	14	Tommy Bowe
OC	13	Brian O'Driscoll	(substituted off) 53'
IC	12	Gordon D'Arcy
LW	11	David Kearney
FH	10	Johnny Sexton	(substituted off) 75'
SH	9	Conor Murray
N8	8	Jamie Heaslip
OF	7	Seán O'Brien
BF	6	Peter O'Mahony	(substituted off) 56'
RL	5	Paul O'Connell (c)
LL	4	Devin Toner	(substituted off) 65'
TP	3	Mike Ross	(substituted off) 65'
HK	2	Rory Best	(substituted off) 14'
LP	1	Cian Healy	(substituted off) 69'
Replacements:
HK	16	Seán Cronin	(substituted on) 14'
PR	17	Jack McGrath	(substituted on) 69'
PR	18	Declan Fitzpatrick	(substituted on) 65'
LK	19	Mike McCarthy	(substituted on) 65'
FL	20	Kevin McLaughlin	(substituted on) 56'
SH	21	Isaac Boss
FH	22	Ian Madigan	(substituted on) 75'
WG	23	Luke Fitzgerald	(substituted on) 53'
Coach:
(New Zealand) Josef Schmidt

FB	15	Israel Dagg	(substituted off) 52'
RW	14	Cory Jane	(substituted off) 67'
OC	13	Ben Smith
IC	12	Ma'a Nonu
LW	11	Julian Savea
FH	10	Aaron Cruden
SH	9	Aaron Smith
N8	8	Kieran Read
OF	7	Richie McCaw (c)
BF	6	Steve Luatua	(substituted off) 56'
RL	5	Sam Whitelock
LL	4	Brodie Retallick
TP	3	Charlie Faumuina	(substituted off) 56'
HK	2	Andrew Hore	(substituted off) 42'
LP	1	Wyatt Crockett	(substituted off) 60'
Replacements:
HK	16	Dane Coles	(substituted on) 42'
PR	17	Ben Franks	(substituted on) 60'
PR	18	Owen Franks	(substituted on) 56'
LK	19	Liam Messam	(substituted on) 56'
FL	20	Sam Cane
SH	21	TJ Perenara
FH	22	Beauden Barrett	(substituted on) 67'
CE	23	Ryan Crotty	(substituted on) 52'
Coach:
(New Zealand) Steve Hansen

Man of the Match:
Seán O'Brien (Ireland)

Touch judges:
Jérôme Garcès (France)
Greg Garner (England)
Television match official:
Graham Hughes (England)

Notes:

- New Zealand were undefeated in 2013, winning 14 from 14 matches, and became the first team in the professional era to win every match in a calendar year.

=== 30 November ===
30 November 2013
14:30 GMT (UTC+0)

Barbarians	43–19	Fiji
Try: Du Plessis (2) 20' m, 38' m Vermeulen 35' c Piutau 52' c De Villiers (2) 55' c, 78' c Taylor 63' m Con: Lambie (4/7) 36', 53', 56', 78'	Report	Try: Tikoirotuma 4' c Seniloli 72' m Rokobaro 79' c Con: Bai (1/1) 6'; Luveniyali (1/2) 80'

Twickenham, London
Attendance: 67,319
Referee: Pascal Gauzère (France)

Team details

FB	15	(Argentina) Santiago Cordero		(substituted off) 40'
RW	14	(New Zealand) Frank Halai
OC	13	(Samoa) Gavin Williams		(substituted off) 54'
IC	12	(South Africa) Jean de Villiers (c)
LW	11	(New Zealand) Charles Piutau
FH	10	(South Africa) Pat Lambie
SH	9	(New Zealand) TJ Perenara		(substituted off) 49'
N8	8	(South Africa) Duane Vermeulen	(yellow card) 72' to 80'
OF	7	(South Africa) Schalk Burger
BF	6	(New Zealand) Steve Luatua
RL	5	(New Zealand) Dominic Bird		(substituted off) 78'
LL	4	(Argentina) Manuel Carizza		(substituted off) 49'
TP	3	(Argentina) Matías Díaz		(substituted off) 60'
HK	2	(South Africa) Bismarck du Plessis		(substituted off) 49'
LP	1	(South Africa) Tendai Mtawarira		(substituted off) 55'
Replacements:
HK	16	(New Zealand) Keven Mealamu		(substituted on) 49'
PR	17	(Argentina) Guillermo Ruan		(substituted on) 55'
PR	18	(South Africa) Coenie Oosthuizen		(substituted on) 60'
LK	19	(Ireland) Mick O'Driscoll		(substituted on) 78'
FL	20	(New Zealand) Luke Whitelock		(substituted on) 49'
SH	21	(Argentina) Martín Landajo		(substituted on) 49'
FH	22	(New Zealand) Tom Taylor		(substituted on) 54'
WG	23	(South Africa) Willie le Roux		(substituted on) 40'
Coach:
(New Zealand) Steve Hansen

FB	15	Nikola Matawalu
RW	14	Sammy Speight		(substituted off) 45'
OC	13	Asaeli Tikoirotuma
IC	12	Levani Botia
LW	11	Adriu Delai
FH	10	Seremaia Bai (c)		(substituted off) 66'
SH	9	Nemia Kenatale		(substituted off) 40'
N8	8	Netani Talei
OF	7	Malakai Ravulo	(yellow card) 22' to 32'	(substituted off) 59'
BF	6	Nemani Nagusa
RL	5	Apisai Naikatini		19' to 24'		(substituted off) 56'
LL	4	Leone Nakarawa
TP	3	Manasa Saulo		(substituted off) 54'
HK	2	Peni Ravai		(substituted off) 55'
LP	1	Campese Ma'afu		(substituted off) 54'
Replacements:
HK	16	Jerry Naureure		(substituted on) 55'
PR	17	Jerry Yanuyanutawa		(substituted on) 54'
PR	18	Setefano Somoca		(substituted on) 54'
FL	19	Sam Matavesi		(substituted on) 19'	(substituted off) 24'	(substituted on) 56'
N8	20	Maku Koroiyadi		(substituted on) 59'
SH	21	Henry Seniloli		(substituted on) 40'
FH	22	Waisea Luveniyali		(substituted on) 66'
WG	23	Alex Rokobaro		(substituted on) 45'
Coach:
(Fiji) Inoke Male

Man of the Match:
Bismarck du Plessis (Barbarians)

Touch judges:
Luke Pearce (England)
Greg Garner (England)
Television match official:
David Grashoff (England)

Notes:

- Fiji awarded caps for this match.
- The traditionally uncapped player of the Barbarians side was scrum-half TJ Perenara.
- Irish lock Mick O'Driscoll came out of retirement to cover the injured Eben Etzebeth; Etzebeth's original replacement, Flip van der Merwe, was not released for the game by

30 November 2013
17:00 GMT (UTC+0)

Wales	26–30	Australia
Try: North (2) 1' c, 58' c Con: Halfpenny (1/1) 2'; Biggar (1/1) 59'; Pen: Halfpenny (2/3) 11', 17'; Biggar (1/1) 30'; Priestland (1/1) 68'	Report	Try: Lealiifano 18' c Folau 36' c Tomane 48' c Con: Lealiifano (3/3) 20', 37', 49'; Pen: Lealiifano (3/3) 13', 42', 52'

Millennium Stadium, Cardiff
Attendance: 67,436
Referee: Wayne Barnes (England)

Team details

FB	15	Leigh Halfpenny
RW	14	Alex Cuthbert
OC	13	Owen Williams		(substituted off) 50'
IC	12	Scott Williams
LW	11	George North
FH	10	Dan Biggar	(yellow card) 35' to 45'	(substituted off) 63'
SH	9	Mike Phillips		(substituted off) 71'
N8	8	Taulupe Faletau
OF	7	Sam Warburton (c)
BF	6	Dan Lydiate		(substituted off) 63'
RL	5	Ian Evans
LL	4	Alun Wyn Jones
TP	3	Rhodri Jones		(substituted off) 66'
HK	2	Richard Hibbard		(substituted off) 63'
LP	1	Gethin Jenkins		(substituted off) 40'
Replacements:
HK	16	Ken Owens		(substituted on) 63'
PR	17	Ryan Bevington		(substituted on) 40'
PR	18	Samson Lee		(substituted on) 66'
FL	19	Ryan Jones
FL	20	Justin Tipuric		(substituted on) 63'
SH	21	Rhodri Williams		(substituted on) 71'
FH	22	Rhys Priestland		(substituted on) 63'
FB	23	Liam Williams		(substituted on) 50'
Coach:
(New Zealand) Warren Gatland

FB	15	Israel Folau
RW	14	Joe Tomane		(substituted off) 74'
OC	13	Adam Ashley-Cooper
IC	12	Christian Lealiifano		(substituted off) 62'
LW	11	Nick Cummins
FH	10	Quade Cooper	(yellow card) 74' to 80'
SH	9	Will Genia
N8	8	Ben Mowen (c)		(substituted off) 70'
OF	7	Michael Hooper
BF	6	Scott Fardy
RL	5	James Horwill		(substituted off) 60'
LL	4	Rob Simmons
TP	3	Sekope Kepu		(substituted off) 55'
HK	2	Stephen Moore		(substituted off) 70'
LP	1	James Slipper		(substituted off) 63'
Replacements:
HK	16	Tatafu Polota-Nau		(substituted on) 70'
PR	17	Benn Robinson		(substituted on) 63'
PR	18	Ben Alexander		(substituted on) 55'
LK	19	Kane Douglas		(substituted on) 60'
FL	20	Dave Dennis		(substituted on) 70'
SH	21	Nic White
CE	22	Mike Harris		(substituted on) 62'
FB	23	Bernard Foley		(substituted on) 74'
Coach:
(Australia) Ewen McKenzie

Man of the Match:
Quade Cooper (Australia)

Touch judges:
Alain Rolland (Ireland)
John Lacey (Ireland)
Television match official:
Jim Yuille (Scotland)

Notes:

- Quade Cooper earned his 50th test cap for Australia.
- Australia won the James Bevan Trophy for the eighth time and for the sixth time in a row.
- Israel Folau scored his 10th international try of the year in this match, equalling the Australian record.

=== 17–21 December ===
17 December 2013
19:30 HKT (UTC+8)

Hong Kong	28–17	Belgium
Try: Jones 79' c Con: Rimene (1/1) 80'; Pen: McAdam (4/5) 6', 10', 17', 23'; Rimene (3/3) 56', 66', 74'	Report	Try: Berger 2' m Pen: Brown (4/6) 12', 15', 20', 32',

King's Park, Hong Kong
Referee: Shuhei Kubo (Japan)

Team details

FB	15	Tom McColl
RW	14	Rowan Varty
OC	13	Jake Phelps
IC	12	Lee Jones
LW	11	Salom Yui Kam Shing
FH	10	Chris McAdam
SH	9	Andrew McCulla
N8	8	Pale Tauti
OF	7	Matt Lamming
BF	6	Nick Hewson (c)
RL	5	Paul Dwyer
LL	4	Bill Brant
TP	3	Stephen Nolan
HK	2	Tom Bolland
LP	1	Leon Wei
Replacements:
HK	16	Alex Harris
PR	17	Jack Bennett
PR	18	James Cooper
FL	19	Josh Li
WG	20	Alex McQueen
SH	21	Jamie Hood
FH	22	Ben Rimene
FL	23	Andrew Bridle
Coach:
(Wales) Leigh Jones

FB	15	Sébastien Guns
RW	14	Nicolas Meeus
OC	13	Dirk Haghedooren
IC	12	Guillaume Piron
LW	11	Jens Torfs
FH	10	Chris Brown
SH	9	Julien Berger
N8	8	Julien Morelli
OF	7	Thomas De Molder (c)
BF	6	Andrew Neill
RL	5	Cyrille Nana Njilem
LL	4	Pierre Hendrickx
TP	3	Maxime Jadot
HK	2	Bastian Vermeylen
LP	1	Norman Wende
Replacements:
PR	16	Julien Massimi
PR	17	Alain Miriallakis
PR	18	André Kouemou
LK	19	Matthieu Verschelden
LK	20	Bertrand Billi	(yellow card) 65' to 75'
SH	21	Hendrik Brouwers
CE	22	Guillaume Brebant
FL	23	Michaël De Molder
Coach:
(France) Richard McClintock

Touch judges:
Tobi Lothian (Hong Kong)
Gabriel Lee (Hong Kong)

21 December 2013
15:30 HKT (UTC+8)

Hong Kong	18–15	Belgium
Pen: Rimene (3/3) 19', 25', 39', 47', 51'; Drop: McAdam 79'	Report	Try: Torfs 33' m Piron 74' c Con: Brown (1/2) 75'; Pen: Brown (1/1) 14'

Hong Kong Football Club Stadium, Hong Kong
Referee: Akihisa Aso (Japan)

Team details

FB	15	Tom McColl
RW	14	Alex McQueen
OC	13	Jake Phelps
IC	12	Lee Jones
LW	11	Salom Yui Kam Shing
FH	10	Ben Rimene
SH	9	Andrew McCulla
N8	8	Pale Tauti
OF	7	Matt Lamming
BF	6	Nick Hewson (c)
RL	5	Paul Dwyer
LL	4	Charles French
TP	3	Stephen Nolan
HK	2	Alex Harris
LP	1	Jack Bennett
Replacements:
HK	16	Tom Bolland
PR	17	Leon Wei
PR	18	James Cooper
LK	19	Bill Brant
SH	20	Jamie Hood
FH	21	Chris McAdam
WG	22	Rowan Varty
FL	23	Andrew Bridle
Coach:
(Wales) Leigh Jones

FB	15
RW	14
OC	13
IC	12
LW	11
FH	10
SH	9
N8	8
OF	7
BF	6
RL	5
LL	4
TP	3
HK	2
LP	1
Replacements:
PR	16
PR	17
PR	18
LK	19
FL	20
SH	21
FH	22
CE	23
Coach:
(France) Richard McClintock

Touch judges:
Tobi Lothian (Hong Kong)
Patrick Kwok (Hong Kong)

== See also ==
- 2013 mid-year rugby union tests
- 2013 Māori All Blacks tour of North America
- 2013 Namibian Tri-Nations
- End of year rugby union tests
- Mid-year rugby union tests
- Serendib International Cup
