= Sila Puafisi =

Tonga international rugby union player

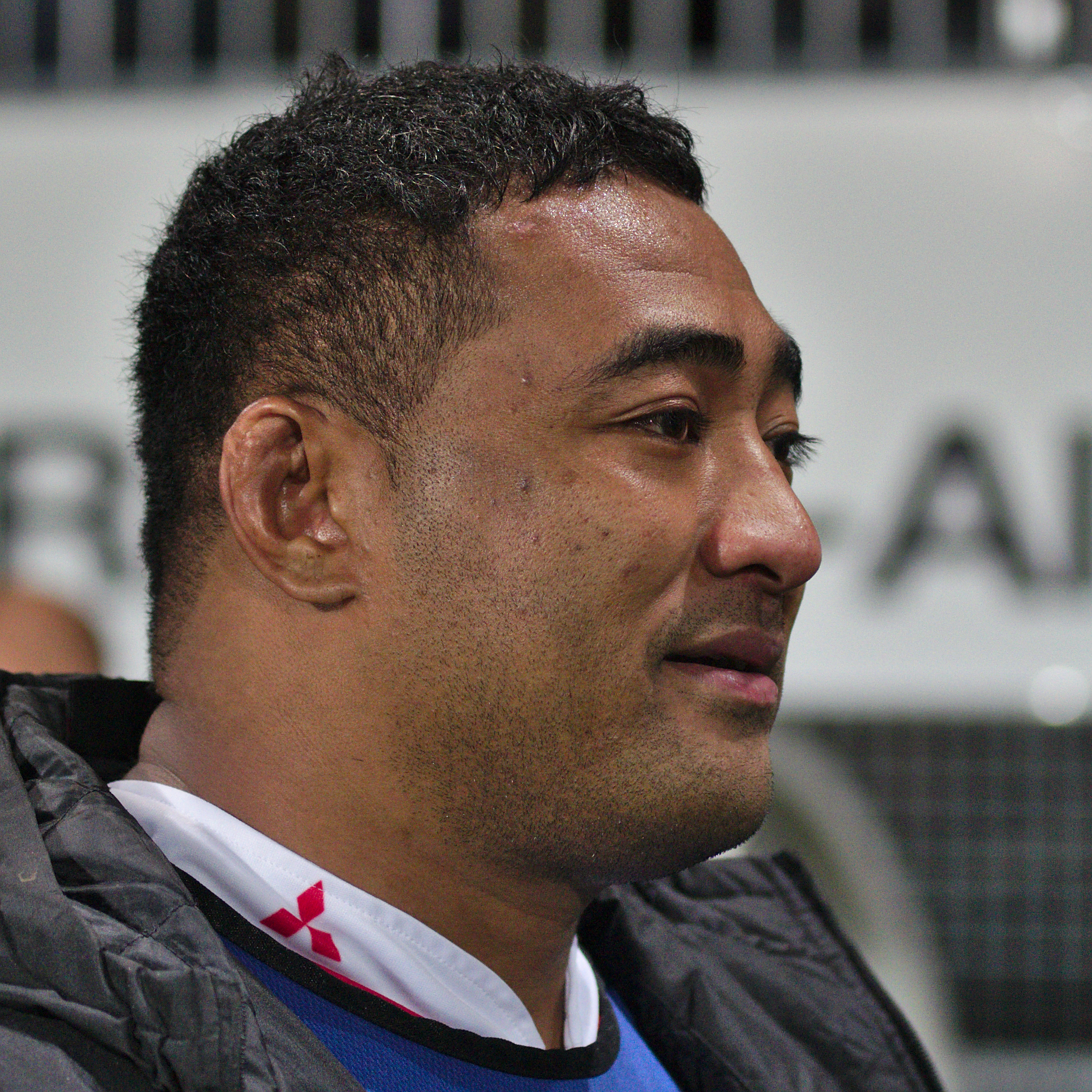
- Puafisi in 2014
- Born: Sila K.V. Puafisi; April 15, 1988 (age 38) Tefisi, Tonga
- Height: 6 ft 1 in (1.85 m)
- Weight: 268 lb (19 st 2 lb; 122 kg)

Rugby union career
- Position: Tighthead Prop
Senior career
Years	Team	Apps	(Points)
2013–2015	Gloucester Rugby	34	(5)
2015–2017	Glasgow Warriors	45	(15)
2017–2018	CA Brive	17	(0)
2018–2020	Stade Rochelais	28	(5)
2022	Hanazono Kintetsu Liners	4	(0)
- Correct as of 7 August 2022
Provincial / State sides
Years	Team	Apps	(Points)
2013	Tasman	11	(0)
2022	Northland	7	(0)
- Correct as of 8 October 2022
International career
Years	Team	Apps	(Points)
2011−	Tonga	28	(0)
- Correct as of 7 August 2022

Sila Puafisi (born 15 April 1988) is a Tongan international rugby union player. He previously played for Glasgow Warriors.

== Career ==
He played for Tasman Mako where they won the 2013 ITM Cup Championship.

He moved, in 2013, to Gloucester Rugby in the Aviva Premiership and was part of the squad that won the 2014–15 European Rugby Challenge Cup but was not used in the Final match against Edinburgh Rugby.

It was announced on 27 August 2015 that the prop had signed for Pro12 champions Glasgow Warriors on a one-year deal.

On 3 January 2017, Puafisi signs for French club CA Brive in the Top 14 from the 2017–18 season.

He signed for La Rochelle for the 2018–19 season.

In 2021 season he was back playing for the Karaka Rugby club in the Counties Manukau region of New Zealand.

=== International career ===
He made his international debut for Tonga in the 2011 IRB Pacific Nations Cup against Japan, losing at 28–27. He was called up to Tonga for the 2013 Autumn Internationals against Romania, France and Wales.
