= Steph Reynolds =

Welsh rugby union player (born 1993)

- Born: Stephan Jerome Reynolds; 23 October 1993 (age 33) Newport, Wales
- Height: 1.75 m (5 ft 9 in)
- Weight: 82 kg (12 st 13 lb)

Rugby union career
- Position: Wing
- Current team: Gloucester Rugby
Senior career
Years	Team	Apps	(Points)
2013–2015	Gloucester Rugby	13	(10)

Stephan Jerome Reynolds (born 23 October 1993) is a former Welsh professional rugby union player. He played as a wing for Gloucester. He is now settled down in his hometown of Chepstow.

In the 2015 Singha Sevens Series, he broke the record for most tries scored in the tournament's history scoring his 20th try against Harlequins in the cup quarter-final, only to be overtaken by Sale Sharks' Paolo Odogwu a year later.
