= Simon Maisuradze =

- Born: 14 September 1986 (age 40) Tbilisi, Georgia
- Height: 1.81 m (5 ft 11 in)
- Weight: 108 kg (17 st 0 lb)

Rugby union career
- Position: Hooker
Senior career
Years	Team	Apps	(Points)
2006-2007	Clermont	0	(0)
2007-2012	Bagnérais	31	(10)
2012-	La Voulte-Valence	54	(15)
- Correct as of 4 September 2015
International career
Years	Team	Apps	(Points)
2010–2015	Georgia	33	(0)
- Correct as of 2 October 2015

Simon Maisuradze (born 14 September 1986) is a Georgian rugby union player. His position is hooker, and he currently plays for La Voulte-Valence in the French Fédérale 1 and the Georgia national team.
