= Isaia Tuifua =

Samoan rugby union player (born 1987)

- Born: 24 August 1987 (age 39) Samoa
- Height: 1.78 m (5 ft 10 in)
- Weight: 99 kg (218 lb)
- School: St Paul's College; Avele College
- Notable relative: Taiasina Tuifua (brother)

Rugby union career
- Position: Inside Centre
Senior career
Years	Team	Apps	(Points)
2012–13	Vigo		
2014	Cardiff Blues	7	(0)
2015	US Montauban	16	(5)
Provincial / State sides
Years	Team	Apps	(Points)
2008–14, 16	Taranaki	35	(5)
- Correct as of 23 October 2016
International career
Years	Team	Apps	(Points)
2013–	Samoa	2	(0)
- Correct as of 16 November 2013

Isaia Tuifua (born 24 August 1987 in Samoa) is a Samoan rugby union player. He plays in the inside centre and occasionally on the wing. He played for the provincial based ITM Cup side Taranaki from 2008 to 2014. In 2014 he played for Cardiff Blues in Wales. He also plays for the Samoan national team. His nickname is Ice.
