= Taiasina Tuifu'a =

Taiasina Tuifua
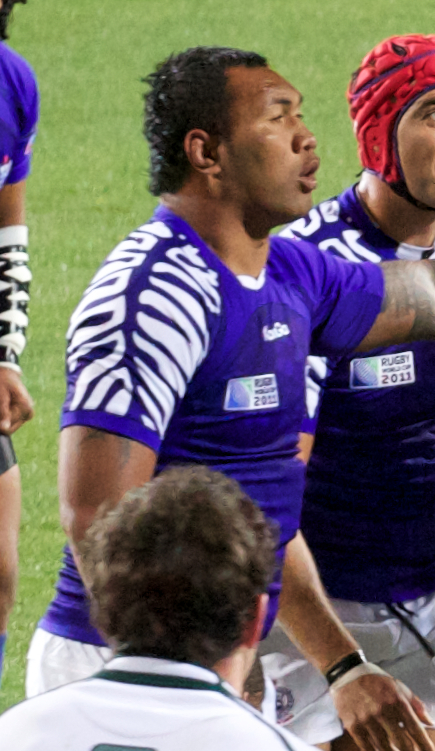
- Born: Taiasina Toleafoa Tuifua; 20 August 1984 (age 42) Moto'otua, Samoa
- Height: 195 cm (6 ft 5 in)
- Weight: 118 kg (18 st 8 lb; 260 lb)
- School: Auckland Grammar School
- Notable relative: Isaia Tuifua (brother)

Rugby union career
- Position(s): Number 8, Lock, Flanker
Senior career
Years	Team	Apps	(Points)
2004–2007	Counties Manukau	38	(40)
2008	Taranaki	10	(0)
2010–2011	Counties Manukau	14	(10)
2011–2013	Newcastle	31	(5)
2013–2015	Bordeaux-Bègles	37	(0)
2015–2018	Lyon	73	(25)
2018–	Grenoble		
- Correct as of 1 June 2017
Super Rugby
Years	Team	Apps	(Points)
2011	Chiefs	2	(0)
International career
Years	Team	Apps	(Points)
2011–2017	Samoa	19	(10)

Taiasina Tuifua (born 20 August 1984) is a Samoan rugby union player who currently plays for Grenoble in the Top 14 in France. His usual position is either at number 8 or at lock. He has won 19 caps at international level for Samoa played at the 2011 Rugby World Cup.

Tuifua was born in Samoa, but moved to New Zealand in 2002 on a rugby scholarship to Auckland Grammar School.
