= Robert Cătălin Dascălu =

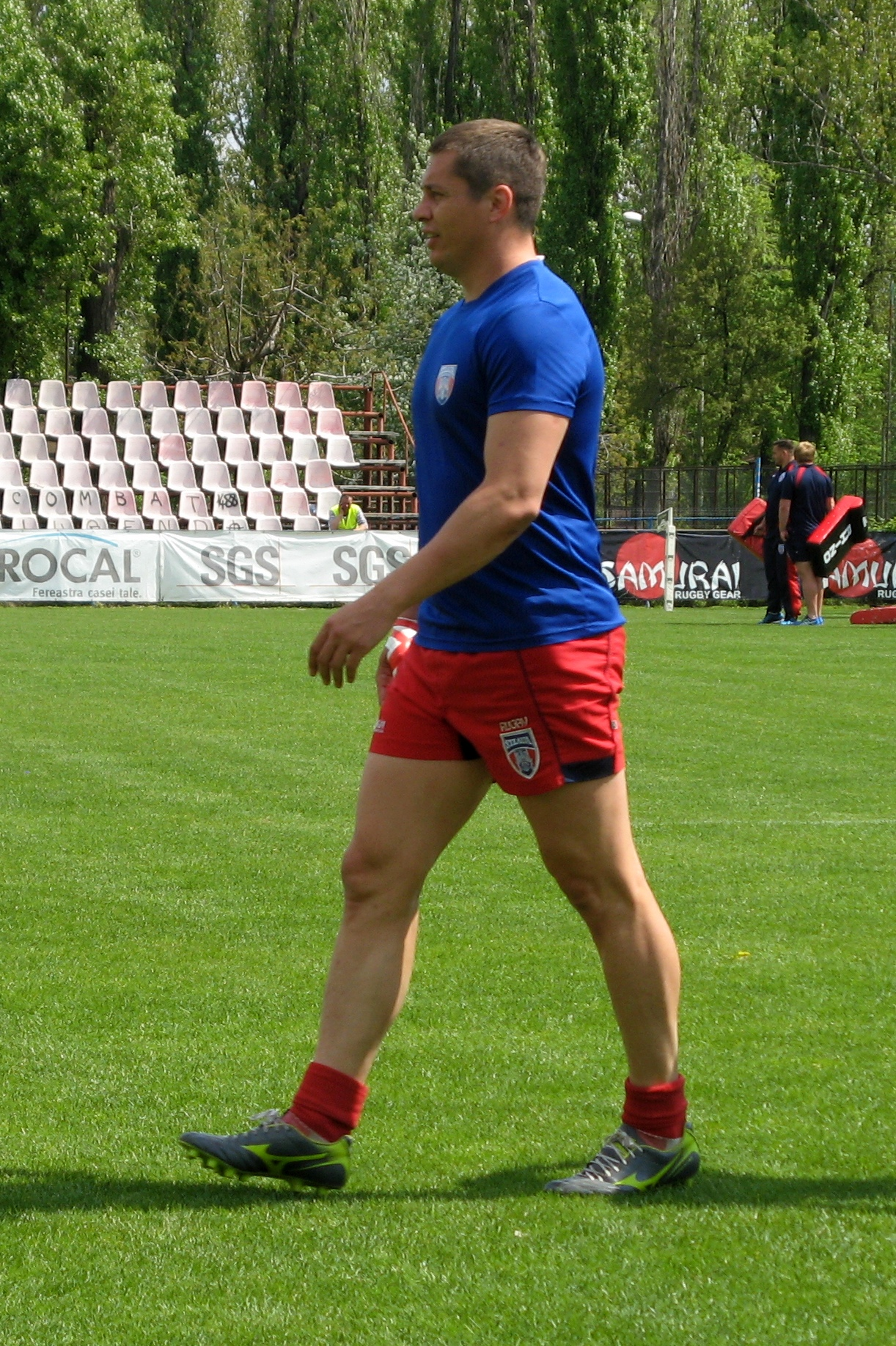
- Robert Cătălin Dascălu training with Steaua in 2017
- Born: Robert Cătălin Dascălu; 13 April 1984 (age 42) Gura Humorului, Romania
- Height: 1.85 m (6 ft 1 in)
- Weight: 96 kg (212 lb)

Rugby union career
- Position: Centre
- Current team: CS Știința Petroșani
Senior career
Years	Team	Apps	(Points)
2005–19	Steaua	50	(67)
2019–Present	CS Știința Petroșani		
- Correct as of 9 July 2015
Provincial / State sides
Years	Team	Apps	(Points)
2005–15	București Wolves	41	(15)
- Correct as of 18 September 2019
International career
Years	Team	Apps	(Points)
2006–Present	Romania	51	(30)
- Correct as of 9 July 2015

Robert Cătălin Dascălu (born 13 April 1984 in Gura Humorului, Romania) is a Romanian rugby union player. He plays as a centre for amateur club CS Știința Petroșani.

== Club career ==
For mostly of his career Dascălu played for Roamanian giants Steaua București. Dascălu also played for București based European Challenge Cup side the Wolves.

== International career ==
Dascălu also plays for Romania's national team the Oaks. He made his international debut in 2006 in the centre position against Ukraine. He has represented Romania in their 2007 Rugby World Cup qualifying before appearing for them in the 2007 Rugby World Cup.
