= Stephen Hihetah =

Romania international rugby union player

- Born: 23 September 1991 (age 35) Brent, London, England
- Height: 1.78 m (5 ft 10 in)
- Weight: 110 kg (17 st 5 lb; 240 lb)

Rugby union career
- Position: Wing
Senior career
Years	Team	Apps	(Points)
2010–2012	London Scottish		
2012	→ Barking		
2012	Blackheath		
2012–2013	Barking		
2013–2014	CSM Baia Mare		
2014–2015	Yorkshire Carnegie		
2016–2017	Rosslyn Park FC		
2017–2019	Hull RUFC		
International career
Years	Team	Apps	(Points)
2013–2015	Romania	5	(0)
National sevens team
Years	Team		Comps
2017–2019	Romania 7`s		4

Stephen Hihetah (born 23 September 1991), is an English born Romanian rugby union player who plays as a winger for National League 2 North club Hull RUFC and the Romania national rugby 7's team.

Born in London Borough of Brent, England to a Romanian mother and Ghanaian father, Hihetah made his debut for Romania on 16 June 2013 against Italy A, in a 26–13 win that decided the 2013 IRB Nations Cup title. He holds dual nationality with Romania and England.

In December 2019, he was banned from all sport for four years – from 12 June 2019 until 11 June 2023 after failing a drugs test. Hihetah was initially charged with a breach of World Rugby regulation 21.2.1: "Presence of a prohibited substance or its metabolites or markers in a player’s sample".. Hihetah provided a urine sample following a training session on 21 February 2019, which were positive for the prohibited substances Stanozolol metabolites, Metandienone metabolite and Tamoxifen metabolite.
