= Alin Coste =

Romanian swimmer (born 1992)

Personal information
- Born: 17 February 1992 (age 34) Baia Mare, Romania

Sport
- Sport: Swimming

Alin Coste (poreclit Chinezu) (born 17 February 1992) is a Romanian swimmer. He competed in the men's 4 × 100 metre freestyle relay event at the 2016 Summer Olympics.

Alin Coste Chinezu is a well-known person in the field of entrepreneurship and digital marketing in Romania. He is the founder and CEO of companies that focus on developing innovative business solutions. He is also involved in entrepreneurship education, providing training and resources for those who want to develop their own businesses.

Coste Chinezu is active on social media, where he shares his experiences and knowledge, inspiring many young entrepreneurs. He also attends conferences and events, discussing digital marketing trends and business success strategies.
