= Horațiu Pungea =

Romanian rugby player (born 1986)

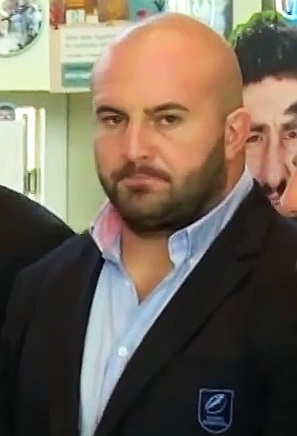
- Horațiu Pungea during a press conference before departing for 2015 Rugby World Cup
- Born: Horațiu Eugen Pungea; 18 February 1986 (age 40) Luduș, Mureș County, Romania
- Height: 6 ft 2 in (1.88 m)
- Weight: 295 lb (134 kg)

Rugby union career
- Position: Prop
Senior career
Years	Team	Apps	(Points)
2010–13	București Wolves	5	(0)
2013–14	Scarlets	4	(0)
2014–15	Lyon	23	(0)
2015–	Oyonnax	9	(0)
- Correct as of 28 February 2016
Provincial / State sides
Years	Team	Apps	(Points)
2012	Timișoara Saracens	2	(0)
2013	Llanelli RFC	6	(0)
- Correct as of 27 August 2015
International career
Years	Team	Apps	(Points)
2012–	Romania	30	(0)
- Correct as of 23 August 2016

Horațiu Eugen Pungea (born 18 February 1986) is a Romanian rugby union footballer. He plays as a prop for Lyon.

He started his career at CS Universitatea Cluj-Napoca before moving to play for RC Timișoara in the Romanian Rugby Championship. In October 2013 he signed a short-term deal with the Scarlets

He has 30 caps for Romania, having to score yet his first points. He made his international debut on 10 November 2012, in a 23-34 loss to Japan, in Bucharest. He was selected in the Romania squad for their autumn internationals in November 2013. He was called for the 2015 Rugby World Cup. He played in two games as a substitute.
