= Cristian Diniș Vârtic =

- Born: 19 June 1983 (age 43) Lupeni, Hunedoara, Romania
- Height: 6 ft 0 in (183 cm)
- Weight: 207 lb (94 kg)

Rugby union career
- Position: Centre
International career
Years	Team	Apps	(Points)
2012–14	Romania	15	(0)

Cristian Diniș Vârtic (born 19 June 1983) is a Romanian former international rugby union player.

== Rugby career ==
Born in Lupeni, Diniș Vârtic was a centre and came through the Cluj University Sports Club, which he joined aged 14. He competed in European competition with București Wolves and spent most of his career with CSM Știința Baia Mare, taking part in four Super League and two Romanian Cup title wins, before retiring in 2016.

=== International ===
Diniș Vârtic played for Romania between 2012 and 2014, gaining 15 total caps.

== Personal life ==
Diniș Vârtic's wife Georgeta represented Romania in international handball.

== See also ==
- List of Romania national rugby union players
