= 2012 Scotland rugby union tour of Australia, Fiji and Samoa =

- Coach: Andy Robinson
- Tour captain: Ross Ford
- Top test point scorer: Greig Laidlaw (38)
- Top test try scorer: Tim Visser (2)
Summary
P	W	D	L
Total
3	3	0	0
Test match
3	3	0	0
Opponent
P	W	D	L
Australia
1	1	0	0
Fiji
1	1	0	0
Samoa
1	1	0	0

Tour chronology
- Americas & SA 2014 →

In June 2012, the Scotland rugby union team made a tour of Australia, Fiji and Samoa, playing one test match against each.

The tour began with Scotland's second consecutive win over Australia, meaning they retained the Hopetoun Cup. (They had beaten Australia 9–8 at Murrayfield in 2009.) Scotland then travelled to Fiji, becoming the first "Tier 1" nation to play a test in a Pacific Island nation since Italy visited Fiji in 2006. Scotland recorded away victories over both Fiji and Samoa.

Scotland were also scheduled to play the New South Wales Waratahs on 10 June, but this match was called off on 11 May as the Waratahs were unable to field a team "due to injuries and the requirements of the Wallabies squad."

== Squad ==
Initial 28-man squad, named on 16 May. Ages and caps correct as of 5 June 2012.

- Head coach: (England) Andy Robinson

Note: Flags indicate national union for the club/province as defined by World Rugby.

Player	Position	Date of birth (age)	Caps	Club/province
Ross Ford (c)	Hooker	23 April 1984 (aged 28)	58	(Scotland) Edinburgh
Dougie Hall	Hooker	24 September 1980 (aged 31)	37	(Scotland) Glasgow Warriors
Scott Lawson	Hooker	28 September 1981 (aged 30)	32	(England) Gloucester
Geoff Cross	Prop	11 December 1982 (aged 29)	13	(Scotland) Edinburgh
Ryan Grant	Prop	8 October 1985 (aged 26)	0	(Scotland) Glasgow Warriors
Euan Murray	Prop	7 August 1980 (aged 31)	44	(England) Newcastle Falcons
Jon Welsh	Prop	13 October 1986 (aged 25)	1	(Scotland) Glasgow Warriors
Richie Gray	Lock	24 August 1989 (aged 22)	21	(Scotland) Glasgow Warriors
Alastair Kellock	Lock	14 June 1981 (aged 30)	41	(Scotland) Glasgow Warriors
Tom Ryder	Lock	21 February 1985 (aged 27)	0	(Scotland) Glasgow Warriors
John Barclay	Flanker	24 September 1986 (aged 25)	37	(Scotland) Glasgow Warriors
Rob Harley	Flanker	26 May 1990 (aged 22)	0	(Scotland) Glasgow Warriors
Ross Rennie	Flanker	29 March 1986 (aged 26)	16	(Scotland) Edinburgh
Alasdair Strokosch	Flanker	21 February 1983 (aged 29)	25	(England) Gloucester
Richie Vernon	Number 8	7 July 1987 (aged 24)	18	(England) Sale Sharks
Mike Blair	Scrum-half	20 April 1981 (aged 31)	80	(Scotland) Edinburgh
Chris Cusiter	Scrum-half	13 June 1982 (aged 29)	59	(Scotland) Glasgow Warriors
Greig Laidlaw	Scrum-half	12 October 1985 (aged 26)	7	(Scotland) Edinburgh
Duncan Weir	Fly-half	10 May 1991 (aged 21)	1	(Scotland) Glasgow Warriors
Joe Ansbro	Centre	29 October 1985 (aged 26)	9	(England) London Irish
Nick De Luca	Centre	1 February 1984 (aged 28)	33	(Scotland) Edinburgh
Alex Grove	Centre	30 November 1987 (aged 24)	3	(England) Worcester Warriors
Matt Scott	Centre	30 September 1990 (aged 21)	1	(Scotland) Edinburgh
Max Evans	Wing	12 September 1983 (aged 28)	28	(France) Castres
Sean Lamont	Wing	15 January 1981 (aged 31)	65	(Wales) Scarlets
Tim Visser	Wing	29 May 1987 (aged 25)	0	(Scotland) Edinburgh
Tom Brown	Fullback	31 March 1990 (aged 22)	0	(Scotland) Edinburgh
Stuart Hogg	Fullback	24 June 1992 (aged 19)	4	(Scotland) Glasgow Warriors

The following players were called up during the tour:

Note: Flags indicate national union for the club/province as defined by World Rugby.

Player	Position	Date of birth (age)	Caps	Club/province
Alex Dunbar	Centre	23 April 1990 (aged 22)	0	(Scotland) Glasgow Warriors
Stuart McInally	Number 8	9 September 1990 (aged 21)	0	(Scotland) Edinburgh
Moray Low (for Jon Welsh)	Prop	28 November 1984 (aged 27)	15	(Scotland) Glasgow Warriors

== Matches ==
=== Australia v Scotland ===
5 June 2012
19:30 AEST (UTC+10)

Australia	6–9	Scotland
Pen: Harris (2/2) 32', 42'	Report	Pen: Laidlaw (3/4) 22', 27', 80'

Hunter Stadium, Newcastle
Attendance: 20,088
Referee: Jaco Peyper (South Africa)

FB	15	Luke Morahan
RW	14	Joe Tomane
OC	13	Anthony Fainga'a
IC	12	Mike Harris
LW	11	Digby Ioane
FH	10	Berrick Barnes
SH	9	Will Genia
N8	8	Scott Higginbotham
OF	7	David Pocock (c)
BF	6	Dave Dennis	(substituted off) 65'
RL	5	Nathan Sharpe
LL	4	Sitaleki Timani	(substituted off) 55'
TP	3	Dan Palmer	(substituted off) 70'
HK	2	Stephen Moore
LP	1	James Slipper
Replacements:
HK	16	Saia Fainga'a
PR	17	Ben Alexander	(substituted on) 70'
LK	18	Rob Simmons	(substituted on) 55'
FL	19	Michael Hooper	(substituted on) 65'
SH	20	Nick Phipps
CE	21	Pat McCabe
WG	22	Adam Ashley-Cooper
Coach:
(New Zealand) Robbie Deans

FB	15	Stuart Hogg
RW	14	Joe Ansbro
OC	13	Nick De Luca
IC	12	Matt Scott
LW	11	Sean Lamont	(substituted off) 38'
FH	10	Greig Laidlaw
SH	9	Mike Blair	(substituted off) 63'
N8	8	John Barclay
OF	7	Ross Rennie
BF	6	Alasdair Strokosch
RL	5	Richie Gray
LL	4	Alastair Kellock
TP	3	Euan Murray
HK	2	Ross Ford (c)
LP	1	Ryan Grant
Replacements:
HK	16	Scott Lawson
PR	17	Jon Welsh
LK	18	Tom Ryder
N8	19	Richie Vernon
SH	20	Chris Cusiter	(substituted on) 63'
FH	21	Duncan Weir
FB	22	Tom Brown	(substituted on) 38'
Coach:
(England) Andy Robinson

Touch judges:
Craig Joubert (South Africa)
Keith Brown (New Zealand)
Television match official:
Vinny Munro (New Zealand)

- Six players made their full international debuts for Australia: Dan Palmer, Dave Dennis, Michael Hooper, Mike Harris, Joe Tomane and Luke Morahan.
- Two players made their full international debuts for Scotland: Ryan Grant and Tom Brown.

=== Fiji v Scotland ===
16 June 2012
14:00 (UTC+12)

Fiji	25–37	Scotland
Try: Domolailai 24' m Nayacalevu 48' c Talebula 64' c Con: Ralulu (2/3); Pen: Ralulu (2/3) 5', 7'	Report	Try: Laidlaw 16' c Penalty try 21' c Visser (2) 36' c, 72' c Con: Laidlaw (4/4); Pen: Laidlaw (3/3) 32', 46', 69'

Churchill Park, Lautoka
Attendance: 15,000
Referee: Jaco Peyper (South Africa)

FB	15	Isimeli Koniferedi	(substituted off) 60'
RW	14	Waisea Nayacalevu
OC	13	Vereniki Goneva
IC	12	Aloisio Buto	(substituted off) 58'
LW	11	Watisoni Votu
FH	10	Jonetai Ralulu
SH	9	Nikola Matawalu	(substituted off) 66'
N8	8	Netani Talei (c)
OF	7	Malakai Ravulo	(substituted off) 17'
BF	6	Iliesa Ratuva	(substituted off) 70'
RL	5	Leone Nakarawa
LL	4	Apisai Naikatini
TP	3	Setefano Somoca
HK	2	Viliame Veikoso	(substituted off) 60'
LP	1	Jerry Yanuyanutawa	(substituted off) 58'
Replacements:
HK	16	Talemaitoga Tuapati	(substituted on) 60'
PR	17	Waisea Nailago	(substituted on) 58'
FL	18	Josefa Domolailai	(substituted on) 17'
LK	19	Kelepi Ketedromo	(substituted on) 70'
SH	20	Nemia Kenatale	(substituted on) 66'
WG	21	Kameli Ratuvou	(substituted on) 58'
FB	22	Metuisela Talebula	(substituted on) 60'
Coach:
(Fiji) Inoke Male

FB	15	Stuart Hogg
RW	14	Max Evans	(substituted off) 62'
OC	13	Nick De Luca
IC	12	Matt Scott
LW	11	Tim Visser
FH	10	Greig Laidlaw	(substituted off) 77'
SH	9	Mike Blair	(substituted off) 55'
N8	8	John Barclay	(substituted off) 58'
OF	7	Ross Rennie
BF	6	Alasdair Strokosch
RL	5	Richie Gray	(substituted off) 78'
LL	4	Alastair Kellock
TP	3	Euan Murray	(substituted off) 66'
HK	2	Ross Ford (c)	(substituted off) 77'
LP	1	Ryan Grant
Replacements:
HK	16	Scott Lawson	(substituted on) 77'
PR	17	Geoff Cross	(substituted on) 66'
LK	18	Tom Ryder	(substituted on) 78'
FL	19	Richie Vernon	(substituted on) 58'
SH	20	Chris Cusiter	(substituted on) 55'
FH	21	Duncan Weir	(substituted on) 77'
WG	22	Sean Lamont	(substituted on) 62'
Coach:
(England) Andy Robinson

Touch judges:
Ian Smith (Australia)
Andrew Lees (Australia)

- Tim Visser made his debut for Scotland, only four days after becoming eligible by completing three years' residency.

=== Samoa v Scotland ===
23 June 2012
15:30 (UTC+12)

Samoa	16–17	Scotland
Try: Pisi 61' c Con: Pisi (1/1) 62'; Pen: Pisi (2/3) 23', 42'; Drop: Pisi 15'	Report	Try: Ansbro 17' c Rob Harley 78' c Con: Laidlaw (2/2) 18', 79'; Pen: Laidlaw (1/1) 51'

Apia Park, Apia
Referee: Jaco Peyper (South Africa)

FB	15	Fa'atoina Autagavai
RW	14	Paul Perez
OC	13	Fautua Otto	(substituted off) 28'
IC	12	Paul Williams
LW	11	David Lemi (c)
FH	10	Tusi Pisi
SH	9	Kahn Fotuali'i	(substituted off) 79'
N8	8	Kane Thompson
OF	7	Maurie Fa'asavalu
BF	6	Ben Masoe	(substituted off) 58'
RL	5	Daniel Crichton	(substituted off) 40'
LL	4	Fa'atiga Lemalu
TP	3	Census Johnston	(substituted off) 40'	(substituted on) 73'	(substituted off) 76'
HK	2	Ti'i Paulo	(substituted off) 64'
LP	1	Sakaria Taulafo	(substituted off) 73'	(substituted on) 76'
Replacements:
HK	16	Ole Avei	(substituted on) 64'
PR	17	Logovi'i Mulipola	(substituted on) 40'
LK	18	Joe Tekori	(substituted on) 40'
FL	19	Afa Aioni	(substituted on) 58'
SH	20	Jeremy Su'a	(substituted on) 79'
FH	21	Ki Anufe
FB	22	Lolo Lui	(substituted on) 28'
Coach:
(Samoa) Stephen Betham

FB	15	Stuart Hogg
RW	14	Sean Lamont
OC	13	Joe Ansbro	(substituted off) 58'
IC	12	Matt Scott
LW	11	Tim Visser
FH	10	Greig Laidlaw
SH	9	Chris Cusiter	(substituted off) 44'
N8	8	Richie Vernon	(substituted off) 63'
OF	7	Ross Rennie
BF	6	Alasdair Strokosch
RL	5	Alastair Kellock	(substituted off) 70'
LL	4	Richie Gray
TP	3	Euan Murray
HK	2	Ross Ford (c)	(substituted off) 64'
LP	1	Ryan Grant
Replacements:
HK	16	Scott Lawson	(substituted on) 64'
PR	17	Geoff Cross
LK	18	Tom Ryder	(substituted on) 70'
FL	19	Rob Harley	(substituted on) 63'
SH	20	Mike Blair	(substituted on) 44'
FH	21	Duncan Weir
WG	22	Max Evans	(substituted on) 58'
Coach:
(England) Andy Robinson

Touch judges:
Ian Smith (Australia)
Andrew Lees (Australia)

- Originally, New Zealand referee Chris Pollock was meant to referee this match, but due to injury, Jaco Peyper of South Africa took over. He is the same referee who refereed both the Australia and the Fiji game.
- It was announced just 50 minutes before kick off that Nick De Luca was out of the match due to thigh strain, and would be replaced by Joe Ansbro.

== Tour statistics ==
Player	Position	Start	Rep	Unused Rep	Minutes Played	Tries	Cons	Pens	Drops	Yellow cards	Red cards	Total points
Ross Ford	Hooker	3	0	0	221	0	0	0	0	0	0	0
Dougie Hall	Hooker	0	0	0	0	0	0	0	0	0	0	0
Scott Lawson	Hooker	0	2	1	19	0	0	0	0	0	0	0
Geoff Cross	Prop	0	1	1	14	0	0	0	0	0	0	0
Ryan Grant	Prop	3	0	0	240	0	0	0	0	0	0	0
Moray Low	Prop	0	0	0	0	0	0	0	0	0	0	0
Euan Murray	Prop	3	0	0	226	0	0	0	0	0	0	0
Jon Welsh	Prop	0	0	1	0	0	0	0	0	0	0	0
Richie Gray	Lock	3	0	0	238	0	0	0	0	0	0	0
Alastair Kellock	Lock	3	0	0	230	0	0	0	0	0	0	0
Tom Ryder	Lock	0	2	1	12	0	0	0	0	0	0	0
John Barclay	Flanker	2	0	0	138	0	0	0	0	0	0	0
Rob Harley	Flanker	0	1	0	17	1	0	0	0	0	0	5
Ross Rennie	Flanker	3	0	0	240	0	0	0	0	0	0	0
Alasdair Strokosch	Flanker	3	0	0	240	0	0	0	0	0	0	0
Stuart McInally	Number 8	0	0	0	0	0	0	0	0	0	0	0
Richie Vernon	Number 8	1	1	1	85	0	0	0	0	0	0	0
Mike Blair	Scrum-half	2	1	0	154	0	0	0	0	0	0	0
Chris Cusiter	Scrum-half	1	2	0	86	0	0	0	0	0	0	0
Greig Laidlaw	Scrum-half	3	0	0	237	1	6	7	0	0	0	38
Duncan Weir	Fly-half	0	1	2	3	0	0	0	0	0	0	0
Joe Ansbro	Centre	2	0	0	138	1	0	0	0	0	0	5
Nick De Luca	Centre	2	0	0	160	0	0	0	0	0	0	0
Alex Dunbar	Centre	0	0	0	0	0	0	0	0	0	0	0
Alex Grove	Centre	0	0	0	0	0	0	0	0	0	0	0
Matt Scott	Centre	3	0	0	240	0	0	0	0	0	0	0
Max Evans	Wing	1	1	0	84	0	0	0	0	0	0	0
Sean Lamont	Wing	2	1	0	136	0	0	0	0	0	0	0
Tim Visser	Wing	2	0	0	160	2	0	0	0	0	0	10
Tom Brown	Fullback	0	1	0	42	0	0	0	0	0	0	0
Stuart Hogg	Fullback	3	0	0	240	0	0	0	0	0	0	0
Penalty try	-	-	-	-	-	1	-	-	-	-	-	5
Total	-	-	-	-	-	6	6	7	0	0	0	63

== See also ==
- 2012 mid-year rugby test series
- 2012 England rugby union tour of South Africa
- 2012 Wales rugby union tour of Australia
- 2012 Ireland rugby union tour of New Zealand
- 2012 France rugby union tour of Argentina
- History of rugby union matches between Fiji and Scotland
- History of rugby union matches between Samoa and Scotland
- History of rugby union matches between Australia and Scotland
