= 2012 IRB Pacific Nations Cup =

Tournament details
- Countries: Fiji; Japan; Samoa; Tonga
- Tournament format(s): Round-robin
- Date: 5–23 June 2012

Tournament statistics
- Teams: 4
- Matches played: 6
- Attendance: 34,141 (5,690 per match)
- Tries scored: 28 (4.67 per match)
- Top point scorer(s): Kurt Morath (Tonga) (39 points)
- Top try scorer(s): David Lemi (Samoa) (3 tries)

Final
- Champions: Samoa (2nd title)
- Runners-up: Fiji

The 2012 Pacific Nations Cup rugby union tournament was held between the four national sides on the Pacific Rim: Fiji, Japan, Samoa and Tonga.

Japan were the reigning champion after they defeated Fiji in the 2011 competition at Churchill Park, Lautoka. The tournament ran from 5 to 23 June 2012 with most of the matches hosted by Japan. Only the match between Tonga and Fiji was played at Churchill Park in Fiji.

The tournament was a round-robin where each team plays all of the other teams once. There were four points for a win, two for a draw and none for a defeat. There were also bonus points offered with one bonus point for scoring four or more tries in a match and one bonus point for losing by 7 points or less.

Samoa emerged as champions.

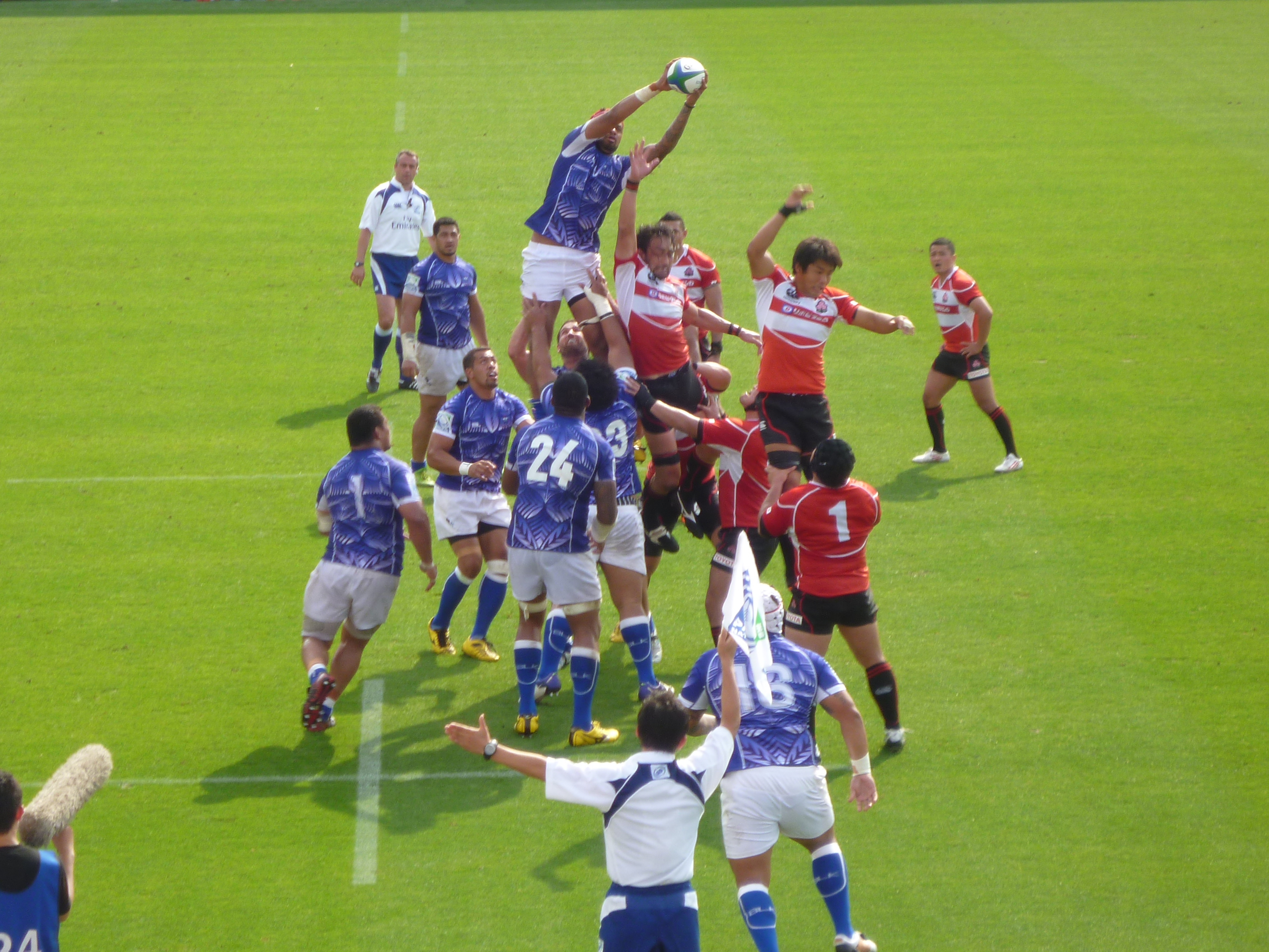
Japan vs Samoa Pacific Nations Cup Match at Chichibunomiya Stadium on 17 June 2012, which was won by Samoa 27-26

== Table ==
2012 IRB Pacific Nations Cup
	Team	Played	Won	Drawn	Lost	Points For	Points Against	Points Difference	Tries For	Tries Against	Try Bonus	Losing Bonus	Points
1	Samoa	3	3	0	0	76	70	+6	8	7	0	0	12
2	Fiji	3	2	0	1	80	65	+15	10	5	1	1	10
3	Tonga	3	1	0	2	59	69	-10	4	8	0	1	5
4	Japan	3	0	0	3	65	76	-11	7	9	1	3	4
Source : irb.com Points breakdown: *4 points for a win *2 points for a draw *1 bonus point for a loss by seven points or less *1 bonus point for scoring four or more tries in a match

== Schedule ==
=== Round 1 ===
5 June 2012
17:10 JST (UTC+09)

Samoa	20 – 18	Tonga
Try: Tuigamala 42' c Lemi 49' c Con: Anufe (2/2) 44', 51'; Pen: Anufe (2/2) 3', 40'; Drop: Lui (0/1)	Report; Stats	Pen: K. Morath (6/9) 6', 20', 35', 46', 54', 59'; Drop: K. Morath (0/1)

Mizuho Rugby Stadium, Nagoya
Attendance: 4,565
Referee: Wayne Barnes (England)

FB	15	Fa'atoina Autagavaia
RW	14	Ken Pisi	(substituted off) 51'
OC	13	Alvin Tavana
IC	12	Ki Anufe
LW	11	David Lemi (c)
FH	10	Lolo Lui
SH	9	Nalu Tuigamala	(substituted off) 51'
N8	8	Benjamin Masoe	(substituted off) 66'
OF	7	Afa Aiono
BF	6	Daniel Crichton
RL	5	Maselino Paulino	(substituted off) 59'
LL	4	Fa'atiga Lemalu
TP	3	Logovii Mulipola	(substituted off) 73'
HK	2	Pelesiusi Fualau	(substituted off) 49'
LP	1	Sakaria Taulafo
Replacements:
HK	16	Ole Avei	(substituted in) 49'
PR	17	Viliamu Afatia	(substituted in) 73'
LK	18	Misioka Timoteo	(substituted in) 59'
N8	19	Alafoti Fa'osiliva	(substituted in) 66'
SH	20	Jeremy Sua	(substituted in) 51'
WG	21	Paul Perez	(substituted in) 51'
FB	22	Patrick Fa'apale
Coach:
(Samoa) Stephen Betham

FB	15	Viliame Iongi
RW	14	Damien Fakafanua
OC	13	Mafileo Kefu
IC	12	Alipate Fatafehi	(substituted off) 40'
LW	11	Alaska Taufa	(yellow card) 2' to 12' (substituted off) 51'
FH	10	Kurt Morath
SH	9	Taniela Moa (c)
N8	8	Paula Kaho	(substituted off) 76'
OF	7	Sione Vaiomoʻunga
BF	6	Sitiveni Mafi	(substituted off) 59'
RL	5	Josh Afu
LL	4	Joe Tuineau
TP	3	Kisi Pulu
HK	2	Ilaisa Maʻasi
LP	1	Viliami Pola	(substituted off) 40'
Replacements:
PR	16	Tevita Mailau	(substituted in) 40'
PR	17	Sila Puafisi
N8	18	Pepa Koloamatangi	(substituted in) 76'
FL	19	Viliami Faingaʻa	(substituted in) 59'
SH	20	Tomasi Palu
WG	21	Siale Piutau	(substituted in) 51'
CE	22	Joseph Vaka	(substituted in) 40'
Coach:
(Australia) Toutai Kefu

Touch judges:
(Japan) Akihisa Aso
(Japan) Taku Otsuki

5 June 2012
19:10 JST (UTC+09)

Fiji	25 – 19	Japan
Try: Katonibau 20' c Nayacalevu 30' c Goneva 59' m Con: Koroilagilagi (2/3) 21', 32'; Pen: Koroilagilagi (2/4) 41', 51'	Report; Stats	Try: Penalty try 62' c Con: Goromaru (1/1) 60'; Pen: Goromaru (4/4) 5', 10', 19', 44'

Mizuho Rugby Stadium, Nagoya
Attendance: 6,036
Referee: John Lacey (Ireland)

FB	15	Isimeli Koniferedi
RW	14	Waisea Nayacalevu	(substituted off) 72'
OC	13	Vereniki Goneva	(substituted off) 60'
IC	12	Isake Katonibau
LW	11	Watisoni Votu
FH	10	Setareki Koroilagilagi
SH	9	Nikola Matawalu	(substituted off) 72'
N8	8	Netani Talei (c)	(substituted off) 65'
OF	7	Malakai Ravulo
BF	6	Iliesa Ratuva
RL	5	Leone Nakarawa
LL	4	Apisai Naikatini	(substituted off) 53'
TP	3	Graham Dewes	(substituted off) 56'
HK	2	Viliame Veikoso	(substituted off) 70'
LP	1	Setefano Somoca
Replacements:
HK	16	Seremaia Naureure	(substituted in) 70'
PR	17	Waisea Daveta	(substituted in) 56'
N8	18	Samu Bola	(substituted in) 65'
LK	19	Kelepi Ketedromo	(substituted in) 53'
SH	20	Kelemedi Bola	(substituted in) 72'
WG	21	Aloisio Buto	(substituted in) 60'
CE	22	Benedito Koroi	(substituted in) 72'
Coach:
(Fiji) Inoke Male

FB	15	Ayumu Goromaru
RW	14	Toshiaki Hirose (c)	(substituted off) 74'
OC	13	Tomohiro Senba
IC	12	Harumichi Tatekawa	(substituted off) 53'
LW	11	Hirotoki Onozawa
FH	10	Kosei Ono
SH	9	Atsushi Hiwasa	(substituted off) 72'
N8	8	Michael Leitch	(substituted off) 64'
OF	7	Takamichi Sasaki
BF	6	Yuta Mochizuki	(substituted off) 65'
RL	5	Hitoshi Ono
LL	4	Shinya Makabe
TP	3	Kensuke Hatakeyama
HK	2	Takeshi Kizu	(substituted off) 64'
LP	1	Yusuke Nagae	(substituted off) 61'
Replacements:
HK	16	Ryuhei Arita	(substituted in) 64'
PR	17	Hiroshi Yamashita	(substituted in) 61'
FL	18	Shoji Ito	(substituted in) 65'
N8	19	Takashi Kikutani	(substituted in) 64'
SH	20	Jun Fujii	(substituted in) 72'
CE	21	Ryan Nicholas	(substituted in) 53'
WG	22	Yasunori Nagatomo	(substituted in) 74'
Coach:
(Australia) Eddie Jones

Touch judges:
(Japan) Taizo Hirabayashi
(Japan) Kyosuke Toda

=== Round 2 ===
10 June 2012
12:10 JST (UTC+09)

Fiji	26 – 29	Samoa
Try: Kenatale 10' c Talei 73' mc Tuapati 79' m Con: Koroilagilagi (1/3) 11'; Pen: Koroilagilagi (3/5) 3', 24', 60'	Report; Stats	Try: Fa'osiliva 27' c Lemi 29' m, 50' m Con: Anufe (1/3) 28'; Pen: Anufe (4/5) 5', 21', 67', 77'; Drop: Anufe (0/1)

Chichibunomiya Rugby Stadium, Tokyo
Attendance: 5,906
Referee: Wayne Barnes (England)

FB	15	Kameli Ratuvou
RW	14	Aloisio Buto	(substituted off) 56'
OC	13	Vereniki Goneva	(substituted off) 75'
IC	12	Isake Katonibau
LW	11	Watisoni Votu
FH	10	Setareki Koroilagilagi
SH	9	Nemia Kenatale	(substituted off) 78'
N8	8	Netani Talei (c)
OF	7	Samu Bola
BF	6	Josefa Domolailai	(substituted off) 61'
RL	5	Leone Nakarawa
LL	4	Apisai Naikatini	(substituted off) 53'
TP	3	Waisea Daveta
HK	2	Seremaia Naureure	(substituted off) 64'
LP	1	Jerry Yanuyanutawa	(substituted off) 53'
Replacements:
HK	16	Talemaitoga Tuapati	(substituted in) 64'
PR	17	Setefano Somoca	(substituted in) 53'
FL	18	Iliesa Ratuva	(substituted in) 61'
LK	19	Malakai Ravulo	(substituted in) 53'
SH	20	Kelemedi Bola	(substituted in) 78'
CE	21	Iliesa Salusalu	(substituted in) 75'
WG	22	Waisea Nayacalevu	(substituted in) 56'
Coach:
(Fiji) Inoke Male

FB	15	Fa'atoina Autagavaia
RW	14	Paul Perez	(substituted off) 59'
OC	13	Lolo Lui
IC	12	Paul Williams	(substituted off) 40'
LW	11	David Lemi (c)
FH	10	Ki Anufe
SH	9	Jeremy Sua	(substituted off) 77'
N8	8	Ben Masoe
OF	7	Maurie Fa'asavalu	(substituted off) 49'
BF	6	Alafoti Fa'osiliva
RL	5	Daniel Crichton	(substituted off) 59'
LL	4	Fa'atiga Lemalu
TP	3	James Johnston	(substituted off) 41'
HK	2	Ole Avei	(substituted off) 75'
LP	1	Sakaria Taulafo
Replacements:
HK	16	Steve Fualau	(substituted in) 75'
PR	17	Logovi'i Mulipola	(substituted in) 41'
LK	18	Maselino Paulino	(substituted in) 59' (yellow card) 69' to 79'
FL	19	Misioka Timoteo	(substituted in) 49'
SH	20	Nalu Tuigamala	(substituted in) 77'
CE	21	Fautua Otto	(substituted in) 40'
WG	22	Ken Pisi	(substituted in) 59'
Coach:
(Samoa) Stephen Betham

Touch judges:
(Ireland) John Lacey
(Japan) Kazuhito Taniguchi

10 June 2012
14:10 JST (UTC+09)

Japan	20 – 24	Tonga
Try: Tui 13' c Goromaru 43' c Con: Goromaru (2/2) 14', 44'; Pen: Goromaru (2/4) 19', 69'	Report; Stats	Try: Taufa 15' c Moa 24' c Kaho 61' c Con: K. Morath (3/3) 16', 25', 63'; Pen: K. Morath (1/4) 25'; Drop: K. Morath (0/1)

Chichibunomiya Rugby Stadium, Tokyo
Attendance: 7,719
Referee: Pascal Gauzere (France)

FB	15	Ayumu Goromaru
RW	14	Toshiaki Hirose (c)
OC	13	Ryan Nicholas	6' to 9' 34' to 37'
IC	12	Harumichi Tatekawa
LW	11	Hirotoki Onozawa
FH	10	Kosei Ono
SH	9	Atsushi Hiwasa
N8	8	Hendrik Tui	(substituted off) 63'
OF	7	Takamichi Sasaki	(substituted off) 63'
BF	6	Yuta Mochizuki
RL	5	Hitoshi Ono	(substituted off) 73'
LL	4	Shinya Makabe
TP	3	Hiroshi Yamashita	(substituted off) 52'
HK	2	Takeshi Kizu	(substituted off) 40'
LP	1	Yusuke Nagae
Replacements:
HK	16	Ryuhei Arita	(substituted in) 40'
PR	17	Kensuke Hatakeyama	(substituted in) 52'
FL	18	Shoji Ito	(substituted in) 63'
N8	19	Takashi Kikutani	(substituted in) 63'
SH	20	Jun Fujii
CE	21	Tomohiro Senba	(substituted in) 6' (substituted off) 9' (substituted in) 34' (substituted off) 37' (substituted in) 73'
WG	22	Yasunori Nagatomo
Coach:
(Australia) Eddie Jones

FB	15	Viliame Iongi
RW	14	Siale Piutau
OC	13	Alipate Fatafehi	(substituted off) 40'
IC	12	Joseph Vaka
LW	11	Alaska Taufa
FH	10	Kurt Morath
SH	9	Taniela Moa (c)
N8	8	Viliami Maʻafu	(substituted off) 35'
OF	7	Sione Vaiomoʻunga	22' to 29'
BF	6	Sitiveni Mafi	(substituted off) 61'
RL	5	Joseph Tuineau
LL	4	Joshua Afu
TP	3	Kisi Pulu
HK	2	Ilaisia Maʻasi
LP	1	Tevita Mailau
Replacements:
HK	16	Viliami Pola
PR	17	Sila Puafisi
N8	18	Paula Kaho	(substituted in) 35'
FL	19	Pepa Koloamatangi	(substituted in) 22' (substituted off) 29' (substituted in) 61'
SH	20	Tomasi Palu
CE	21	Mafileo Kefu	(substituted in) 40' (yellow card) 70' to 80'
WG	22	Eddie Paea
Coach:
(Australia) Toutai Kefu

Touch judges:
(Ireland) John Lacey
(Japan) Taizo Hirabayashi

=== Round 3 ===
17 June 2012
14:10 JST (UTC+09)

Samoa	27 – 26	Japan
Try: Fotuali'i 31' c Lemalu (2) 38' c, 61' m Con: Anufe (2/2) 31', 39'; Lui (1/1); Pen: Anufe (2/5) 43', 65'; Drop: Fotuali'i (0/1)	Report; Stats	Try: Tui 19' m Kikutani (2) 26' m, 28' m Hirose 37' m Con: Goromaru (0/2); Nicholas (0/2); Pen: Goromaru (2/2) 7', 11'

Chichibunomiya Rugby Stadium, Tokyo
Attendance: 5,386
Referee: John Lacey (Ireland)

FB	15	Fa'atoina Autagavaia
RW	14	Paul Perez
OC	13	Lolo Lui
IC	12	Paul Williams
LW	11	David Lemi (c)
FH	10	Ki Anufe	(substituted off) 66'
SH	9	Kahn Fotuali'i
N8	8	Kane Thompson
OF	7	Maurie Fa'asavalu	(substituted off) 57'
BF	6	Alafoti Fa'osiliva
RL	5	Joe Tekori	19' to 24' (substituted off) 62'
LL	4	Fa'atiga Lemalu
TP	3	Logovi'i Mulipola	(yellow card) 17' to 27' (substituted off) 57'
HK	2	Ti'i Paulo	(substituted off) 57'
LP	1	Sakaria Taulafo	(yellow card) 36' to 46'
Replacements:
HK	16	Ole Avei	(substituted in) 57'
PR	17	Census Johnston	(substituted in) 19' (substituted off) 24' (substituted in) 57'
LK	18	Daniel Crichton	(substituted in) 62'
N8	19	Ben Masoe	(substituted in) 57'
FH	20	Jeremy Sua	(substituted in) 66'
CE	21	Fautua Otto
WG	22	Ken Pisi
Coach:
(Samoa) Stephen Betham

FB	15	Ayumu Goromaru	(substituted off) 68'
RW	14	Toshiaki Hirose (c)
OC	13	Tomohiro Senba
IC	12	Ryan Nicholas
LW	11	Hirotoki Onozawa
FH	10	Harumichi Tatekawa	(substituted off) 57'
SH	9	Atsushi Hiwasa	(substituted off) 70'
N8	8	Hendrik Tui
OF	7	Yuta Mochizuki	(substituted off) 57'
BF	6	Takashi Kikutani
RL	5	Hitoshi Ono
LL	4	Shinya Makabe	(substituted off) 61'
TP	3	Kensuke Hatakeyama	(substituted off) 63'
HK	2	Takeshi Kizu	(substituted off) 54'
LP	1	Yusuke Nagae
Replacements:
PR	16	Ryuhei Arita	(substituted in) 54'
PR	17	Hiroshi Yamashita	(substituted in) 63'
LK	18	Shoji Ito	(substituted in) 61'
FL	19	Takamichi Sasaki	(substituted in) 57'
SH	20	Jun Fujii	(substituted in) 70'
FH	21	Kosei Ono	(substituted in) 57'
WG	22	Yasunori Nagatomo	(substituted in) 68'
Coach:
(Australia) Eddie Jones

Touch judges:
(Japan) Taizo Hirabayashi
(Japan) Taku Otsuki

23 June 2012
15:40 (UTC+12)

Tonga	17 – 29	Fiji
Try: Piutau 43' m Con: K. Morath (0/1); Pen: K. Morath (4/5) 21', 28', 31', 61'	Report; Stats	Try: Talebula (2) 19' c, 64' m Naureure 47' c Mocetadra 61' c Con: Ralulu (2/3) 19', 47'; Talebula (1/1) 61'; Pen: Talebula (1/2) 67'; Drop: Talebula (0/1)

Churchill Park, Lautoka
Attendance: 4,529
Referee: Keith Brown (New Zealand)

FB	15	Viliame Iongi
RW	14	Siale Piutau
OC	13	Mafileo Kefu	(substituted off) 40'
IC	12	Alipate Fatafehi	(substituted off) 69'
LW	11	Alaska Taufa
FH	10	Kurt Morath	(substituted off) 71'
SH	9	Taniela Moa (c)
N8	8	Paula Kaho	(substituted off) 61'
OF	7	Sione Vaiomoʻunga
BF	6	Sitiveni Mafi	(substituted off) 26'
RL	5	Joseph Tuineau
LL	4	Joshua Afu
TP	3	Kisi Pulu	(substituted off) 76'
HK	2	Ilaisia Maʻasi	(substituted off) 66'
LP	1	Ofa Faingaʻanuku
Replacements:
HK	16	Viliami Pola	(substituted in) 66'
PR	17	Sila Puafisi	(substituted in) 76'
FL	18	Lua Lokotui	(substituted in) 26'
N8	19	Viliami Faingaʻa	(substituted in) 61'
FH	20	Tomasi Palu	(substituted in) 71'
CE	21	Joseph Vaka	(substituted in) 40'
CE	22	Eddie Paea	(substituted in) 69'
Coach:
(Australia) Toutai Kefu

FB	15	Metuisela Talebula
RW	14	Isimeli Koniferedi	(substituted off) 49'
OC	13	Vereniki Goneva	(substituted off) 63'
IC	12	Isake Katonibau
LW	11	Watisoni Votu
FH	10	Jonetani Ralulu	(substituted off) 67'
SH	9	Nikola Matawalu
N8	8	Kelepi Ketedromo
OF	7	Samu Bola	(substituted off) 65'
BF	6	Josefa Domolailai
RL	5	Leone Nakarawa	(substituted off) 45'
LL	4	Apisai Naikatini
TP	3	Setefano Somoca (c)
HK	2	Seremaia Naureure	(substituted off) 64'
LP	1	Graham Dewes	(substituted off) 46'
Replacements:
HK	16	Talemaitoga Tuapati	(substituted in) 64'
PR	17	Jerry Yanuyanutawa	(substituted in) 46'
LK	18	Iliesa Ratuva	(substituted in) 45'
FL	19	Apakuki Waisavu	(substituted in) 65'
SH	20	Kelemedi Bola	(substituted in) 63'
FH	21	Benedito Koroi	(substituted in) 67'
CE	22	Maikeli Mocetadra	(substituted in) 49'
Coach:
(Fiji) Inoke Male

Touch judges:
(New Zealand) Garratt Williamson
(Fiji) Samuela Tuidraki

== Statistics ==
=== Point scorers ===
Rank	Player	Team	Points
1	Kurt Morath	Tonga	39
2	Ayumu Goromaru	Japan	35
3	Ki Anufe	Samoa	34
4	Setareki Koroilagilagi	Fiji	21
5	David Lemi	Samoa	15
5	Metuisela Talebula	Fiji	15
7	Takashi Kikutani	Japan	10
7	Faatiga Lemalu	Samoa	10
7	Hendrik Tui	Japan	10

Source: irb.com

=== Try scorers ===
Rank	Player	Team	Tries
1	David Lemi	Samoa	3
2	Takashi Kikutani	Japan	2
2	Faatiga Lemalu	Samoa	2
2	Metuisela Talebula	Fiji	2
2	Hendrik Tui	Japan	2
6	17 players + 1 Penalty try		1

Source: irb.com

== See also ==
- 2012 IRB Nations Cup
