= 2014 IRB Pacific Nations Cup =

Tournament details
- Countries: Canada; Fiji; Japan; Samoa; Tonga; United States
- Tournament format(s): Round-robin
- Date: 7–21 June 2014

Tournament statistics
- Matches played: 6
- Attendance: 46,986 (7,831 per match)
- Tries scored: 37 (6.17 per match)
- Top point scorer(s): Ayumu Goromaru (Japan); 36 points
- Top try scorer(s): Blaine Scully (United States); 5 tries

Final
- Champions: Japan (Asia/Pacific conf) (2nd title); Samoa (Pacific Islands conf) (3rd title)
- Runners-up: United States (Asia/Pacific conf); Fiji (Pacific Islands conf)

The 2014 IRB Pacific Nations Cup, was the ninth edition of the IRB Pacific Nations Cup, the annual Tier 2 Rugby union tournament. Unlike previous competitions, the tournament was divided into two conferences of three teams each, with no interconference matches. Samoa emerged as the winner of the Pacific Islands conference title ahead of Fiji and Tonga, while Japan took out the Asia/Pacific conference remaining undefeated ahead of United States and Canada.

== Format ==
Each team played each other once in their respective conferences, with no interconference matches. Four points were awarded for a win, two points for a draw and one point for a bonus point; the bonus point being awarded should a team score four or more tries in a match, or for a loss by seven points or less. The winner of each conferences was the team with the most log points, with tiebreakers being the head to-head results between teams equal on log points, followed points difference for-and-against.

As the three-week tournament coincided with the three-week June international window, players were able to be released from their clubs for their national teams. When a team was not in action in either conference, they played host to a touring Tier 1 nation from Europe. In Round 1, the United States hosted Scotland, while Fiji hosted Italy. In Round 2, Canada played Scotland, and Samoa played Italy. In Round 3, Japan hosted Italy and Tonga played a Pacific Barbarians side.

The full match schedule was announced on 9 April 2014.

== Asia/Pacific conference ==
=== Table ===
	Team	Played	Won	Drawn	Lost	Points For	Points Against	Points Diff	Tries For	Tries Against	Try Bonus	Losing Bonus	Points
1	Japan (12)	2	2	0	0	71	54	+17	7	7	1	0	9
2	United States (18)	2	1	0	1	67	72	–5	8	9	2	0	6
3	Canada (15)	2	0	0	2	60	72	–12	8	7	1	1	2
Points breakdown: *4 points for a win *2 points for a draw *1 bonus point for a loss by seven points or less *1 bonus point for scoring four or more tries in a match Pre-tournament rankings are in parentheses. Source: IRB Updated: 15 June 2014

=== Fixtures ===
==== Round 1 ====
7 June 2014
18:00 PST (UTC-08)

Canada	25–34	Japan
Try: Hearn 7' m Moonlight 35' c Paris 38' c Con: Pritchard (2/3) 37', 39'; Pen: Pritchard (2/2) 18', 32'	Report	Try: Fujita 42' m Tamura 63' c Tui 72' c Con: Goromaru (2/3) 64', 73'; Pen: Goromaru (5/5) 13', 15', 28', 56', 80'

Swangard Stadium, Burnaby, British Columbia
Attendance: 6,382
Referee: Leighton Hodges (Wales)

Team details

FB	15	James Pritchard
RW	14	Jeff Hassler
OC	13	Ciaran Hearn	(substituted off) 68'
IC	12	Nick Blevins
LW	11	Taylor Paris
FH	10	Harry Jones	(substituted off) 73'
SH	9	Gordon McRorie	(substituted off) 56'
N8	8	Tyler Ardron (c)
OF	7	John Moonlight
BF	6	Adam Kleeberger	(substituted off) 51'
RL	5	Jamie Cudmore
LL	4	Tyler Hotson	(substituted off) 75'
TP	3	Jason Marshall	(substituted off) 59'
HK	2	Ray Barkwill	(substituted off) 75'
LP	1	Hubert Buydens	(substituted off) 56'
Replacements:
PR	16	Andrew Tiedemann	(substituted on) 56'
FL	17	Aaron Carpenter	(substituted on) 51'
PR	18	Jake Illnicki	(substituted on) 59'
LK	19	Jon Phelan	(substituted on) 75'
HK	20	Benoît Piffero	(substituted on) 75'
SH	21	Phil Mack	(substituted on) 56'
FB	22	Connor Braid	(substituted on) 73'
WG	23	D. T. H. van der Merwe	(substituted on) 68'
Coach:
(New Zealand) Kieran Crowley

FB	15	Ayumu Goromaru
RW	14	Yoshikazu Fujita		(substituted off) 43'
OC	13	Male Sa'u
IC	12	Yuu Tamura
LW	11	Akihito Yamada
FH	10	Harumichi Tatekawa
SH	9	Fumiaki Tanaka
N8	8	Koliniasi Holani		35' to 40'		(substituted off) 61'
OF	7	Michael Leitch (c)		(substituted off) 78'
BF	6	Justin Ives		9' to 13'
RL	5	Luke Thompson
LL	4	Hitoshi Ono		(substituted off) 51'
TP	3	Kensuke Hatakeyama		(substituted off) 72'
HK	2	Shota Horie	(yellow card) 32' to 42'
LP	1	Masataka Mikami		53' to 63'		(substituted off) 74'
Replacements:
PR	16	Hisateru Hirashima		(substituted on) 53'	(substituted off) 63'	(substituted on) 74'
HK	17	Takeshi Kizu		(substituted on) 35'	(substituted off) 40'
PR	18	Hiroshi Yamashita		(substituted on) 72'
LK	19	Shoji Ito		(substituted on) 51'
LK	20	Shinya Makabe		(substituted on) 78'
FL	21	Hendrik Tui		(substituted on) 9'	(substituted off) 13'	(substituted on) 61'
SH	22	Atsushi Hiwasa
WG	23	Toshiaki Hirose		(substituted on) 43'
Coach:
(Australia) Eddie Jones

Man of the Match:
Taylor Paris (Canada)

Touch judges:
Greg Garner (England)
Nick Ricono (United States)

Notes:

- Gordon McRorie made his international debut for Canada.

==== Round 2 ====
14 June 2014
19:30 PDT (UTC-07)

United States	29–37	Japan
Try: Dolan 9' c Scully (3) 32' c, 61' c, 68' m Con: Wyles (3/4) 10', 33', 22'; Pen: Wyles (1/1) 23'	Report	Try: Tanaka 13' c Yamada 27' c Holani (2) 43' c, 54' c Con: Goromaru (4/4) 14', 29', 44', 55'; Pen: Goromaru (3/4) 20', 50', 75'

StubHub Center, Carson, California
Attendance: 5,100
Referee: Greg Garner (England)

Team details

FB	15	Chris Wyles
RW	14	Blaine Scully
OC	13	Folau Niua
IC	12	Seamus Kelly
LW	11	Tim Maupin
FH	10	Shalom Suniula
SH	9	Mike Petri
N8	8	Cam Dolan	(substituted off) 50'
OF	7	Todd Clever (c)	(substituted off) 65'
BF	6	Danny Barrett
RL	5	Scott LaValla
LL	4	Samu Manoa
TP	3	Olive Kilifi	(substituted off) 55'
HK	2	Phil Thiel	(substituted off) 59'
LP	1	Nicholas Wallace	(substituted off) 55'
Replacements:
HK	16	Tom Coolican	(substituted on) 59'
PR	17	Eric Fry	(substituted on) 55'
PR	18	Titi Lamositele	(substituted on) 55'
LK	19	Louis Stanfill	(substituted on) 50'
FL	20	Kyle Sumsion	(substituted on) 65'
CE	21	Chad London
WG	22	Thretton Palamo
WG	23	Miles Craigwell
Coach:
(United States) Mike Tolkin

FB	15	Ayumu Goromaru
RW	14	Akihito Yamada
OC	13	Male Sa'u
IC	12	Yuu Tamura
LW	11	Kenki Fukuoka
FH	10	Harumichi Tatekawa
SH	9	Fumiaki Tanaka	(substituted off) 64'
N8	8	Koliniasi Holani	(substituted off) 58'
OF	7	Michael Leitch (c)
BF	6	Justin Ives
RL	5	Luke Thompson	(substituted off) 70'
LL	4	Shoji Ito	(substituted off) 58'
TP	3	Kensuke Hatakeyama
HK	2	Shota Horie
LP	1	Masataka Mikami	(substituted off) 55'
Replacements:
PR	16	Hisateru Hirashima	(substituted on) 55'
HK	17	Takeshi Kizu
PR	18	Hiroshi Yamashita
LK	19	Shinya Makabe	(substituted on) 70'
LK	20	Hitoshi Ono	(substituted on) 58'
FL	21	Hendrik Tui	(substituted on) 58'
SH	22	Atsushi Hiwasa	(substituted on) 64'
WG	23	Toshiaki Hirose
Coach:
(Australia) Eddie Jones

Touch judges:
Leighton Hodges (Wales)
Francisco Pastrana (Argentina)

==== Round 3 ====
21 June 2014
15:00 PDT (UTC-07)

United States	38–35	Canada
Try: Scully (2) 26' m, 60' c Wyles 31' c Thompson 70' c Con: Wyles (3/4) 32', 61', 71'; Pen: Wyles (4/4) 5', 11', 52', 68'	Report	Try: Jones (2) 22' c, 43' c Carpenter 36' c Pritchard 39' c Hearn 40' c Con: Pritchard (5/5) 24', 36', 39', 40', 44'

Bonney Field, Sacramento, California
Attendance: 7,804
Referee: Stuart Berry (South Africa)

Team details

FB	15	Chris Wyles		(substituted off) 75'
RW	14	Blaine Scully
OC	13	Seamus Kelly
IC	12	Thretton Palamo		(substituted off) 44'
LW	11	Brett Thompson
FH	10	Shalom Suniula
SH	9	Mike Petri
N8	8	Danny Barrett
OF	7	Scott LaValla	(yellow card) 80' to 80'
BF	6	Todd Clever (c)
RL	5	Hayden Smith		(substituted off) 63'
LL	4	Samu Manoa
TP	3	Olive Kilifi		(substituted off) 48'
HK	2	Phil Thiel		(substituted off) 47'
LP	1	Nicholas Wallace		(substituted off) 71'
Replacements:
HK	16	Tom Coolican		(substituted on) 47'
PR	17	Eric Fry		(substituted on) 71'
PR	18	Titi Lamositele		(substituted on) 48'
LK	19	Louis Stanfill		(substituted on) 63'
FL	20	Kyle Sumsion
CE	21	Folau Niua		(substituted on) 44'
CE	22	Chad London
WG	23	Luke Hume		(substituted on) 75'
Coach:
(United States) Mike Tolkin

FB	15	James Pritchard
RW	14	Jeff Hassler		(substituted off) 40'
OC	13	Ciaran Hearn
IC	12	Connor Braid
LW	11	D. T. H. van der Merwe
FH	10	Harry Jones
SH	9	Phil Mack	(yellow card) 9' to 19'	(substituted off) 34'
N8	8	Tyler Ardron (c)		(substituted off) 56'
OF	7	John Moonlight
BF	6	Jebb Sinclair	(yellow card) 52' to 62'
RL	5	Tyler Hotson		(substituted off) 40'
LL	4	Jamie Cudmore
TP	3	Jake Ilnicki		(substituted off) 40'
HK	2	Aaron Carpenter		(substituted off) 62'
LP	1	Andrew Tiedemann		(substituted off) 40'
Replacements:
PR	16	Hubert Buydens		(substituted on) 62'
HK	17	Ray Barkwill		(substituted on) 40'
PR	18	Jason Marshall		(substituted on) 40'
LK	19	Jon Phelan		(substituted on) 56'
FL	20	Kyle Gilmour		(substituted on) 40'
SH	21	Gordon McRorie		(substituted on) 34'
FH	22	Nathan Hirayama		(substituted on) 40'
CE	23	Nick Blevins
Coach:
(New Zealand) Kieran Crowley

Touch judges:
Greg Garner (England)
Leighton Hodges (Wales)

Notes:

- Brett Thompson made his international debut for the United States.
- This was the United States first win over Canada in seven attempts. United States last won in July 2009.

== Pacific Islands conference ==
=== Table ===
	Team	Played	Won	Drawn	Lost	Points For	Points Against	Points Diff	Tries For	Tries Against	Try Bonus	Losing Bonus	Points
1	Samoa (9)	2	1	1	0	36	31	+5	2	4	0	0	6
2	Fiji (11)	2	1	0	1	58	35	+23	8	2	1	1	6
3	Tonga (13)	2	0	1	1	35	63	–28	4	8	0	0	2
Points breakdown: *4 points for a win *2 points for a draw *1 bonus point for a loss by seven points or less *1 bonus point for scoring four or more tries in a match Pre-tournament rankings are in parentheses. Source: IRB Updated: 15 June 2014

=== Fixtures ===
==== Round 1 ====
7 June 2014
14:00 WST (UTC+13)

Samoa	18–18	Tonga
Try: Otto 31' m Lemi 66' c Con: T. Pisi (1/2) 67'; Pen: T. Pisi (2/3) 58', 75'	Report	Try: Katoa 22' c Afu 39' m Con: Fosita (1/2) 23'; Pen: Fosita (1/3) 70'; Apikotoa (1/1) 78'

Apia Park, Apia
Attendance: 14,500
Referee: Wayne Barnes (England)

Team details

FB	15	Fa'atoina Autagavaia
RW	14	Tua Otto				(substituted off) 54'
OC	13	Alapati Leiua
IC	12	Johnny Leota
LW	11	David Lemi (c)		32' to 35'
FH	10	Tusi Pisi
SH	9	Jeremy Su'a		(substituted off) 45'
N8	8	Taiasina Tuifu'a		(substituted off) 45'
OF	7	Jack Lam
BF	6	Faifili Levave		(substituted off) 50'
RL	5	Filo Paulo
LL	4	Kane Thompson			(substituted off) 74'	(substituted on) 78'	(substituted off) 79'
TP	3	Logovi'i Mulipola		(substituted off) 67'	(substituted on) 74'	(substituted off) 78'
HK	2	Ole Avei		(substituted off) 67'
LP	1	Sakaria Taulafo		(substituted off) 54'
Replacements:
HK	16	Ti'i Paulo		(substituted on) 67'
PR	17	Anthony Perenise		(substituted on) 54'
PR	18	Census Johnston	(yellow card) 71' to 80'	(substituted on) 67'
LK	19	Daniel Leo		(substituted on) 50'
FL	20	Ofisa Treviranus		(substituted on) 45'
SH	21	Kahn Fotuali'i		(substituted on) 45'
CE	22	George Pisi		(substituted on) 32'	(substituted off) 35'	(substituted on) 54'
WG	23	Anitelea Tuilagi					(substituted on) 79'
Coach:
(Samoa) Stephen Betham

FB	15	David Halaifonua
RW	14	Otulea Katoa		(substituted off) 50'
OC	13	Siale Piutau
IC	12	Fraser Anderson
LW	11	Alaska Taufa	(yellow card) 43' to 53'
FH	10	Latiume Fosita		(substituted off) 70'
SH	9	Samisoni Fisilau		(substituted off) 48'
N8	8	Viliami Maʻafu
OF	7	Nili Latu (c)
BF	6	Pasuka Mapakaitolo		(substituted off) 61'
RL	5	Lisiate Faʻaoso		(substituted off) 50'
LL	4	Josh Afu
TP	3	Sila Puafisi		(substituted off) 49'
HK	2	Suliasi Taufalele		(substituted off) 76'
LP	1	Tevita Mailau		(substituted off) 76'
Replacements:
PR	16	Paul Ngauamo		(substituted on) 76'
HK	17	Eddie Aholelei		(substituted on) 49'
PR	18	Kama Sakalia		(substituted on) 76'
LK	19	Daniel Faleafa		(substituted on) 50'
FL	20	Viliami Fihaki		(substituted on) 61'
SH	21	Sonatane Takulua		(substituted on) 48'
FH	22	Fangatapu Apikotoa		(substituted on) 70'
WG	23	Fetuʻu Vainikolo		(substituted on) 50'
Coach:
(Tonga) Mana Otai

Touch judges:
Mathieu Raynal (France)
Andrew Lees (Australia)

Notes:

- Paul Ngauamo and Sonatane Takulua made their international debuts for Tonga.

==== Round 2 ====
14 June 2014
15:00 FJT (UTC+12)

Fiji	45–17	Tonga
Try: Votu (2) 7' c, 52' c Nadolo 13' c Bobo (2) 31' c, 79 'c Waqaniburotu 80' c Con: Nadolo (6/6) 8', 14', 32', 53', 79', 80'; Pen: Nadolo (1/1) 4'	Report	Try: Fihaki (2) 64' c, 69' c Con: Fosita (2/2) 65', 70'; Pen: Apikotoa (1/2) 22'

Churchill Park, Lautoka
Attendance: 5,850
Referee: Rohan Hoffmann (Australia)

Team details

FB	15	Timoci Nagusa	(substituted off) 49'
RW	14	Sireli Bobo
OC	13	Adriu Delai	(substituted off) 75'
IC	12	Nemani Nadolo
LW	11	Watisoni Votu
FH	10	Jonetani Ralulu	(substituted off) 80'
SH	9	Nikola Matawalu	(substituted off) 79'
N8	8	Akapusi Qera (c)
OF	7	Malakai Ravulo	(substituted off) 40'
BF	6	Dominiko Waqaniburotu
RL	5	Leone Nakarawa
LL	4	Apisalome Ratuniyarawa	(substituted off) 68'
TP	3	Manasa Saulo	(substituted off) 49'	(substituted on) 70'
HK	2	Talemaitoga Tuapati	(substituted off) 74'
LP	1	Campese Ma'afu	(substituted off) 49'
Replacements:
HK	16	Viliame Veikoso	(substituted on) 74'
PR	17	Jerry Yanuyanutawa	(substituted on) 49'
PR	18	Isei Colati	(substituted on) 49'	(substituted off) 70'
LK	19	Apisai Naikatini	(substituted on) 68'
N8	20	Nemani Nagusa	(substituted on) 40'
SH	21	Nemia Kenatale	(substituted on) 79'
WG	22	Waisea Nayacalevu	(substituted on) 75'
FB	23	Metuisela Talebula	(substituted on) 49'
Coach:
(New Zealand) John McKee

FB	15	David Halaifonua
RW	14	Fetuʻu Vainikolo	(substituted off) 15'
OC	13	Siale Piutau
IC	12	Fraser Anderson
LW	11	Alaska Taufa
FH	10	Fangatapu Apikotoa	(substituted off) 56'
SH	9	Sonatane Takulua	(substituted off) 66'
N8	8	Viliami Maʻafu
OF	7	Nili Latu (c)
BF	6	Pasuka Mapakaitolo	(substituted off) 45'
RL	5	Daniel Faleafa	(substituted off) 63'
LL	4	Josh Afu
TP	3	Sila Puafisi	(substituted off) 54'
HK	2	Suliasi Taufalele	(substituted off) 48'
LP	1	Tevita Mailau	(substituted off) 48'
Replacements:
PR	16	Paul Ngauamo	(substituted on) 48'
HK	17	Ofa Faingaʻanuku	(substituted on) 48'
PR	18	Eddie Aholelei	(substituted on) 54'
LK	19	Steve Mafi	(substituted on) 45'
FL	20	Viliami Fihaki	(substituted on) 63'
SH	21	Samisoni Fisilau	(substituted on) 66'
FH	22	Latiume Fosita	(substituted on) 56'
WG	23	William Helu	(substituted on) 15'
Coach:
(Tonga) Mana Otai

Touch judges:
JP Doyle (England)
Mathieu Raynal (France)

Notes

- Fijian winger, Sireli Bobo became the oldest player ever to represent Fiji when he ran onto the field at 38 years and 137 days old.

==== Round 3 ====
21 June 2014
15:00 FJT (UTC+12)

Fiji	13–18	Samoa
Try: Nadolo 11' m Nalaga 42' m Pen: Nadolo (1/1) 45'	Report	Pen: T. Pisi (6/7) 2', 16', 25', 28', 40', 64'

ANZ National Stadium, Suva
Attendance: 7,350
Referee: Mathieu Raynal (France)

Team details

FB	15	Metuisela Talebula
RW	14	Napolioni Nalaga
OC	13	Asaeli Tikoirotuma
IC	12	Nemani Nadolo
LW	11	Sireli Bobo		(substituted off) 58'
FH	10	Jonetani Ralulu
SH	9	Nikola Matawalu
N8	8	Nemani Nagusa		(substituted off) 76'
OF	7	Akapusi Qera (c)
BF	6	Dominiko Waqaniburotu
RL	5	Leone Nakarawa	(yellow card) 39' to 49'
LL	4	Apisalome Ratuniyarawa		(substituted off) 65'
TP	3	Manasa Saulo
HK	2	Talemaitoga Tuapati
LP	1	Campese Ma'afu		(substituted off) 65'
Replacements:
HK	16	Sunia Koto
PR	17	Jerry Yanuyanutawa		(substituted on) 65'
PR	18	Leroy Atalifo
LK	19	Wame Lewaravu		(substituted on) 65'
FL	20	Malakai Ravulo		(substituted on) 76'
SH	21	Nemia Kenatale
WG	22	Watisoni Votu		(substituted on) 58'
FH	23	Isoa Donaldson
Coach:
(New Zealand) John McKee

FB	15	Fa'atoina Autagavaia
RW	14	Fautua Otto	(yellow card) 51' to 61'	(substituted off) 65'
OC	13	George Pisi
IC	12	Johnny Leota
LW	11	David Lemi (c)	(yellow card) 73' to 80'
FH	10	Tusi Pisi
SH	9	Kahn Fotuali'i
N8	8	Taiasina Tuifu'a		(substituted off) 73'
OF	7	Jack Lam
BF	6	Maurie Fa'asavalu
RL	5	Daniel Leo
LL	4	Filo Paulo		(substituted off) 55'
TP	3	James Johnston		(substituted off) 50'
HK	2	Ti'i Paulo		(substituted off) 53'
LP	1	Logovi'i Mulipola
Replacements:
HK	16	Ole Avei		(substituted on) 53'
PR	17	Anthony Perenise
PR	18	Census Johnston		(substituted on) 50'
LK	19	Piula Faasalele		(substituted on) 73'
FL	20	Joe Tekori		(substituted on) 55'
SH	21	Vavao Afemai
FH	22	Patrick Fa'apale		(substituted on) 65'
WG	23	Anitele'a Tuilagi
Coach:
(Samoa) Stephen Betham

Touch judges:
JP Doyle (England)
Rohan Hoffmann (Australia)

== Statistics ==
=== Points scorers ===
Pos	Name	Team	Pts
1	Ayumu Goromaru	Japan	36
2	Chris Wyles	United States	32
3	Nemani Nadolo	Fiji	28
4	Tusi Pisi	Samoa	26
5	James Pritchard	Canada	25
5	Blaine Scully	United States	25
7	Sireli Bobo	Fiji	10
7	Viliami Fihaki	Tonga	10
7	Ciaran Hearn	Canada	10
7	Koliniasi Holani	Japan	10
7	Harry Jones	Canada	10
7	Watisoni Votu	Fiji	10
13	Latiume Fosita	Tonga	9
14	Fangatapu Apikotoa	Tonga	6
15	Josh Afu	Tonga	5
15	Aaron Carpenter	Canada	5
15	Cam Dolan	United States	5
15	Yoshikazu Fujita	Japan	5
15	Otulea Katoa	Tonga	5
15	David Lemi	Samoa	5
15	John Moonlight	Canada	5
15	Napolioni Nalaga	Fiji	5
15	Tua Otto	Samoa	5
15	Taylor Paris	Canada	5
15	Yuu Tamura	Japan	5
15	Fumiaki Tanaka	Japan	5
15	Brett Thompson	United States	5
15	Hendrik Tui	Japan	5
15	Dominiko Waqaniburotu	Fiji	5
15	Akihito Yamada	Japan	5

=== Try scorers ===
Pos	Name	Team	Tries
1	Blaine Scully	United States	5
2	Sireli Bobo	Fiji	2
2	Viliami Fihaki	Tonga	2
2	Ciaran Hearn	Canada	2
2	Koliniasi Holani	Japan	2
2	Harry Jones	Canada	2
2	Nemani Nadolo	Fiji	2
2	Watisoni Votu	Fiji	2
6	Josh Afu	Tonga	1
6	Aaron Carpenter	Canada	1
6	Cam Dolan	United States	1
6	Yoshikazu Fujita	Japan	1
6	Otulea Katoa	Tonga	1
6	David Lemi	Samoa	1
6	John Moonlight	Canada	1
6	Napolioni Nalaga	Fiji	1
6	Tua Otto	Samoa	1
6	Taylor Paris	Canada	1
6	James Pritchard	Canada	1
6	Yuu Tamura	Japan	1
6	Fumiaki Tanaka	Japan	1
6	Brett Thompson	United States	1
6	Hendrik Tui	Japan	1
6	Dominiko Waqaniburotu	Fiji	1
6	Chris Wyles	United States	1
6	Akihito Yamada	Japan	1

== Squads ==
Nation	Stadium			Head coach	Captain
Nation	Home stadium	Capacity	City	Head coach	Captain
Canada	Swangard Stadium	5,288	Burnaby	(New Zealand) Kieran Crowley	Tyler Ardron
Fiji	ANZ Stadium	30,000	Suva	(New Zealand) John McKee	Akapusi Qera
Fiji	Churchill Park	18,000	Lautoka	(New Zealand) John McKee	Akapusi Qera
Japan	No home games			(Australia) Eddie Jones	Michael Leitch
Samoa	Apia Park	15,000	Apia	(Samoa) Stephen Betham	David Lemi
Tonga	No home games			(Tonga) Mana Otai	Nili Latu
United States	StubHub Center	30,510	Carson	(United States) Mike Tolkin	Todd Clever
United States	Bonney Field	8,000	Sacramento	(United States) Mike Tolkin	Todd Clever

Note: Number of caps and players' ages are indicated as of 7 June 2014 – the tournament's opening day, pre first tournament match.

=== Canada ===
Canada's 27-man roster for the 2014 IRB Pacific Nations Cup.

On 19 June, Nathan Hirayama and Kyle Gilmour were added to the squad as further cover for their respective positions.

Note: Flags indicate national union for the club/province as defined by World Rugby.

Player	Position	Date of birth (age)	Caps	Club/province
Ray Barkwill	Hooker	26 August 1980 (aged 33)	11	(Canada) Ontario Blues
Aaron Carpenter	Hooker	9 January 1983 (aged 31)	54	(England) Cornish Pirates
Benoît Piffero	Hooker	21 May 1987 (aged 27)	3	(France) Blagnac
Hubert Buydens	Prop	4 January 1982 (aged 32)	22	(New Zealand) Manawatu Turbos
Jake Illnicki	Prop	24 February 1992 (aged 22)	2	(Canada) BC Bears
Jason Marshall	Prop	5 February 1985 (aged 29)	24	(France) La Rochelle
Andrew Tiedemann	Prop	21 July 1988 (aged 25)	25	(Canada) Prairie Wolf Pack
Jamie Cudmore	Lock	6 September 1978 (aged 35)	28	(France) Clermont
Tyler Hotson	Lock	30 May 1985 (aged 29)	38	(England) London Scottish
Jon Phelan	Lock	20 January 1986 (aged 28)	15	(Canada) Atlantic Rock
Nanyak Dala	Flanker	18 June 1984 (aged 29)	28	(Canada) Saskatoon Wild Oats
Kyle Gilmour	Flanker		1	(Canada) Prairie Wolf Pack
Adam Kleeberger	Flanker	2 March 1984 (aged 30)	37	(Canada) BC Bears
John Moonlight	Flanker	2 July 1987 (aged 26)	11	(Canada) Ontario Blues
Jebb Sinclair	Flanker	8 April 1986 (aged 28)	32	(England) London Irish
Tyler Ardron (c)	Number 8	16 June 1991 (aged 22)	13	(Wales) Ospreys
Phil Mack	Scrum-half	18 September 1985 (aged 28)	18	(Canada) BC Bears
Gordon McRorie	Scrum-half		0	(Canada) Prairie Wolf Pack
Nathan Hirayama	Fly-half	23 March 1988 (aged 26)	13	(Canada) BC Bears
Harry Jones	Fly-half	26 August 1989 (aged 24)	9	(Canada) BC Bears
Liam Underwood	Fly-half	3 June 1991 (aged 23)	6	(Canada) Ontario Blues
Nick Blevins	Centre	11 November 1988 (aged 25)	17	(Canada) Prairie Wolf Pack
Ciaran Hearn	Centre	30 December 1985 (aged 28)	33	(Canada) Atlantic Rock
Pat Parfrey	Centre	1 November 1991 (aged 22)	5	(England) Atlantic Rock
Jeff Hassler	Wing	21 August 1991 (aged 22)	6	(Wales) Ospreys
D. T. H. van der Merwe	Wing	28 April 1986 (aged 28)	26	(Scotland) Glasgow Warriors
Taylor Paris	Wing	6 October 1992 (aged 21)	10	(France) Agen
Connor Braid	Fullback	31 May 1990 (aged 24)	9	(Canada) BC Bears
James Pritchard	Fullback	21 July 1979 (aged 34)	54	(England) Bedford Blues

=== Fiji ===
Fiji 29-man squad for the 2014 IRB Pacific Nations Cup.

On 31 May, it was announced that Vereniki Goneva and Levani Botia were withdrawn from the squad due to injury. Watisoni Votu was added to the squad to replace Goneva, while Botia was not replaced.

Ahead of the final Round 3 match against Samoa, McKee added former footballer Isoa Donaldson to the squad to increase depth in the Fly Half position.

Note: Flags indicate national union for the club/province as defined by World Rugby.

Player	Position	Date of birth (age)	Caps	Club/province
Sunia Koto	Hooker	15 April 1980 (aged 34)	35	(France) Narbonne
Talemaitoga Tuapati	Hooker	16 August 1984 (aged 29)	22	(New Zealand) Southland
Viliame Veikoso	Hooker	4 April 1982 (aged 32)	27	(Fiji) Suva
Leroy Atalifo	Prop		0	(Fiji) Suva
Isei Colati	Prop	23 December 1983 (aged 30)	0	(France) Nevers
Campese Ma'afu	Prop	19 December 1984 (aged 29)	22	(England) Nottingham
Manasa Saulo	Prop	6 April 1989 (aged 25)	10	(Fiji) Suva
Jerry Yanuyanutawa	Prop	10 April 1985 (aged 29)	13	(Scotland) Glasgow Warriors
Wame Lewaravu	Lock	24 September 1983 (aged 30)	24	(France) Stade Montois
Apisai Naikatini	Lock	4 April 1985 (aged 29)	15	(France) Brive
Leone Nakarawa	Lock	2 April 1988 (aged 26)	19	(Scotland) Glasgow Warriors
Rupeni Nasiga	Lock	8 October 1985 (aged 28)	14	(Fiji) Nadroga
Apisalome Ratuniyarawa	Lock	23 January 1983 (aged 31)	9	(France) Agen
Akapusi Qera (c)	Flanker	24 April 1984 (aged 30)	35	(France) Toulouse
Malakai Ravulo	Flanker	22 September 1983 (aged 30)	23	(Romania) RCJ Farul Constanța
Dominiko Waqaniburotu	Flanker	20 April 1986 (aged 28)	12	(France) Brive
Nemani Nagusa	Number 8	21 June 1988 (aged 25)	3	(Fiji) Nadroga
Netani Talei	Number 8	19 March 1983 (aged 31)	28	(Wales) Newport Gwent Dragons
Nemia Kenatale	Scrum-half	21 January 1986 (aged 28)	25	(Romania) RCJ Farul Constanța
Nikola Matawalu	Scrum-half	8 March 1989 (aged 25)	15	(Scotland) Glasgow Warriors
Isoa Donaldson	Fly-half		0	(Fiji) Suva
Jonetani Ralulu	Fly-half	30 September 1986 (aged 27)	9	(Fiji) Nadroga
Levani Botia	Centre	28 April 1988 (aged 26)	1	(France) La Rochelle
Adriu Delai	Centre	11 June 1984 (aged 29)	8	(France) Tarbes
Vereniki Goneva	Centre	5 April 1984 (aged 30)	29	(England) Leicester Tigers
Nemani Nadolo	Centre	31 January 1988 (aged 26)	11	(New Zealand) Crusaders
Sireli Bobo	Wing	28 January 1976 (aged 38)	17	(France) La Rochelle
Napolioni Nalaga	Wing	7 April 1986 (aged 28)	15	(France) Clermont
Waisea Nayacalevu	Wing	26 June 1990 (aged 23)	3	(France) Stade Français
Asaeli Tikoirotuma	Wing	24 June 1986 (aged 27)	3	(New Zealand) Chiefs
Watisoni Votu	Wing	25 March 1985 (aged 29)	7	(France) Perpignan
Timoci Nagusa	Fullback	14 July 1987 (aged 26)	16	(France) Montpellier
Metuisela Talebula	Fullback	20 May 1991 (aged 23)	7	(France) Bordeaux

=== Japan ===
Japanese 28-man squad for the 2014 IRB Pacific Nations Cup.

Note: Flags indicate national union for the club/province as defined by World Rugby.

Player	Position	Date of birth (age)	Caps	Club/province
Shota Horie	Hooker	21 January 1986 (aged 28)	29	(Australia) Melbourne Rebels
Takeshi Kizu	Hooker	15 July 1988 (aged 25)	27	(Japan) Kobelco Steelers
Kensuke Hatakeyama	Prop	2 August 1985 (aged 28)	54	(Japan) Suntory Sungoliath
Hisateru Hirashima	Prop	5 January 1983 (aged 31)	32	(Japan) Kobelco Steelers
Masataka Mikami	Prop	4 June 1988 (aged 26)	18	(Japan) Toshiba Brave Lupus
Hiroshi Yamashita	Prop	1 January 1986 (aged 28)	34	(Japan) Kobelco Steelers
Shoji Ito	Lock	2 December 1980 (aged 33)	23	(Japan) Kobelco Steelers
Justin Ives	Lock	24 May 1984 (aged 30)	20	(Japan) Canon Eagles
Shinya Makabe	Lock	26 March 1987 (aged 27)	24	(Japan) Suntory Sungoliath
Hitoshi Ono	Lock	6 May 1978 (aged 36)	82	(Japan) Toshiba Brave Lupus
Luke Thompson	Lock	16 April 1981 (aged 33)	45	(Japan) Kintetsu Liners
Kyosuke Horie	Flanker	11 July 1990 (aged 23)	2	(Japan) Yamaha Júbilo
Michael Leitch (c)	Flanker	7 October 1988 (aged 25)	34	(Japan) Toshiba Brave Lupus
Hendrik Tui	Flanker	13 December 1987 (aged 26)	22	(Japan) Suntory Sungoliath
Koliniasi Holani	Number 8	25 October 1981 (aged 32)	32	(Japan) Panasonic Wild Knights
Takashi Kikutani	Number 8	24 February 1980 (aged 34)	68	(England) Saracens
Atsushi Hiwasa	Scrum-half	22 May 1987 (aged 27)	35	(Japan) Suntory Sungoliath
Fumiaki Tanaka	Scrum-half	3 January 1985 (aged 29)	41	(New Zealand) Highlanders
Ryoto Nakamura	Fly-half	3 June 1991 (aged 23)	4	(Japan) Teikyo University
Harumichi Tatekawa	Fly-half	2 December 1989 (aged 24)	23	(Australia) Brumbies
Kotaro Matsushima	Centre	23 February 1993 (aged 21)	4	(Japan) Suntory Sungoliath
Male Sa'u	Centre	13 October 1987 (aged 26)	15	(Australia) Melbourne Rebels
Yuu Tamura	Centre	9 January 1989 (aged 25)	22	(Japan) NEC Green Rockets
Yoshikazu Fujita	Wing	8 September 1993 (aged 20)	17	(Japan) Waseda University
Kenki Fukuoka	Wing	7 September 1992 (aged 21)	9	(Japan) University of Tsukuba
Toshiaki Hirose	Wing	17 October 1981 (aged 32)	20	(Japan) Toshiba Brave Lupus
Akihito Yamada	Wing	26 July 1986 (aged 27)	6	(Japan) Panasonic Wild Knights
Ayumu Goromaru	Fullback	1 March 1986 (aged 28)	38	(Japan) Yamaha Júbilo

=== Samoa ===
Samoa 31-man squad for the 2014 IRB Pacific Nations Cup.

On 19 June, Joe Tekori was added to the squad to cover the back row.

Note: Flags indicate national union for the club/province as defined by World Rugby.

Player	Position	Date of birth (age)	Caps	Club/province
Ole Avei	Hooker	13 June 1983 (aged 30)	15	(France) Bordeaux Bègles
Ti'i Paulo	Hooker	13 January 1983 (aged 31)	17	(France) Clermont
Andrew Williams	Hooker	20 June 1985 (aged 28)	9	(Samoa) Marist St. Joseph
Census Johnston	Prop	6 May 1981 (aged 33)	42	(France) Toulouse
James Johnston	Prop	6 March 1986 (aged 28)	12	(England) Saracens
Logovi'i Mulipola	Prop	11 March 1987 (aged 27)	14	(England) Leicester Tigers
Anthony Perenise	Prop	18 October 1982 (aged 31)	15	(England) Bath
Sakaria Taulafo	Prop	29 January 1983 (aged 31)	26	(France) Stade Français
Piula Fa'asalele	Lock	22 January 1988 (aged 26)	2	(France) Castres
Fa'atiga Lemalu	Lock	17 April 1989 (aged 25)	9	(Japan) Fukuoka Sanix Blues
Daniel Leo	Lock	2 October 1982 (aged 31)	37	(France) Perpignan
Filo Paulo	Lock	6 November 1987 (aged 26)	8	(Wales) Cardiff Blues
Kane Thompson	Lock	9 January 1982 (aged 32)	26	(New Zealand) Chiefs
Maurie Fa'asavalu	Flanker	12 January 1980 (aged 34)	19	(England) Harlequins
Jack Lam	Flanker	18 November 1987 (aged 26)	5	(New Zealand) Hurricanes
Joe Tekori	Flanker	17 December 1983 (aged 30)	27	(France) Toulouse
Ofisa Treviranus	Flanker	31 March 1984 (aged 30)	27	(England) London Irish
Faifili Levave	Number 8	15 January 1986 (aged 28)	2	(New Zealand) Hurricanes
Taiasina Tuifu'a	Number 8	20 August 1984 (aged 29)	13	(France) Bordeaux Bègles
Vavao Afemai	Scrum-half	18 February 1992 (aged 22)	1	(Samoa) Vaiala Rugby
Kahn Fotuali'i	Scrum-half	22 May 1982 (aged 32)	16	(England) Northampton Saints
Jeremy Su'a	Scrum-half	10 November 1988 (aged 25)	13	(England) Worcester Warriors
Patrick Fa'apale	Fly-half	5 March 1991 (aged 23)	1	(Samoa) Vaiala Rugby
Tusi Pisi	Fly-half	18 June 1982 (aged 31)	18	(Japan) Suntory Sungoliath
Alapati Leiua	Centre	21 September 1988 (aged 25)	5	(New Zealand) Hurricanes
Johnny Leota	Centre	21 January 1984 (aged 30)	10	(England) Sale Sharks
Tua Otto	Centre	23 July 1985 (aged 28)	9	(England) Bristol
George Pisi	Centre	29 June 1986 (aged 27)	14	(England) Northampton Saints
David Lemi (c)	Wing	10 February 1982 (aged 32)	36	(England) Worcester Warriors
Anitelea Tuilagi	Wing	24 February 1981 (aged 33)	30	(Samoa) Vaiala Rugby
Brando Va'aulu	Wing	3 May 1987 (aged 27)	6	(Australia) Sunnybank Rugby
Fa'atoina Autagavaia	Fullback	18 September 1988 (aged 25)	8	(England) Northampton Saints

=== Tonga ===
Tonga's 29-man squad for the 2014 IRB Pacific Nations Cup.

Note: Flags indicate national union for the club/province as defined by World Rugby.

Player	Position	Date of birth (age)	Caps	Club/province
Paul Ngauamo	Hooker	19 February 1990 (aged 24)	0	(New Zealand) Sydenham R.F.C.
Suliasi Taufalele	Hooker	12 August 1988 (aged 25)	2	(New Zealand) Counties Manukau
Eddie Aholelei	Prop	3 December 1981 (aged 32)	4	(Australia) Melbourne Rebels
Ofa Faingaʻanuku	Prop	5 December 1982 (aged 31)	2	(England) Worcester Warriors
Tevita Mailau	Prop	25 April 1985 (aged 29)	8	(France) Stade Montois
Sila Puafisi	Prop	15 April 1988 (aged 26)	8	(England) Gloucester
Kama Sakalia	Prop	23 August 1985 (aged 28)	5	(Tonga) Marist 'Apifo'ou
Josh Afu	Lock	21 February 1987 (aged 27)	15	(Japan) Kamaishi Seawaves
Lisiate Faʻaoso	Lock	18 March 1983 (aged 31)	12	(France) Bayonne
Daniel Faleafa	Lock	13 February 1989 (aged 25)	2	(Australia) Randwick
Semisi Taulava	Lock	26 February 1983 (aged 31)	0	(England) Worcester Warriors
Viliami Fihaki	Flanker	17 January 1987 (aged 27)	3	(England) Sale Sharks
Steve Mafi	Flanker	9 December 1989 (aged 24)	9	(England) Leicester Tigers
Pasuka Mapakaitolo	Flanker	27 April 1980 (aged 34)	3	(Japan) Kobelco Steelers
Opeti Fonua	Number 8	26 May 1986 (aged 28)	5	(France) Bayonne
Nili Latu (c)	Number 8	19 February 1982 (aged 32)	37	(Japan) Green Rockets
Viliami Maʻafu	Number 8	9 March 1982 (aged 32)	16	(France) Oyonnax
Samisoni Fisilau	Scrum-half	29 November 1987 (aged 26)	13	(New Zealand) Bay of Plenty
Sonatane Takulua	Scrum-half	11 January 1991 (aged 23)	0	(New Zealand) Northland
Fangatapu Apikotoa	Fly-half	31 August 1983 (aged 30)	28	(Tonga) Marist 'Apifo'ou
Latiume Fosita	Fly-half	25 July 1992 (aged 21)	3	(New Zealand) Northland
Fraser Anderson	Centre	20 April 1984 (aged 30)	2	(Japan) Kobelco Steelers
Viliami Hakalo	Centre	12 April 1987 (aged 27)	6	(Tonga) Toa Saracens
Siale Piutau	Centre	13 October 1985 (aged 28)	14	(Japan) Yamaha Júbilo
Alaska Taufa	Centre	24 July 1983 (aged 30)	10	(Japan) Akita Northern Bullets
William Helu	Wing	19 April 1986 (aged 28)	18	(England) London Wasps
Fetuʻu Vainikolo	Wing	30 January 1985 (aged 29)	12	(England) Exeter Chiefs
David Halaifonua	Fullback	5 July 1987 (aged 26)	7	(Tonga) Hofoa
Otulea Katoa	Fullback	26 April 1991 (aged 23)	7	(Tonga) Grammar Teachers

=== United States ===
United States 40-man roster for the 2014 IRB Pacific Nations Cup. Caps are current as of June 1, 2014.

Note: Head coach Tolkin, will weekly reduce the squad to 28 for each test.

Note: Flags indicate national union for the club/province as defined by World Rugby.

Player	Position	Date of birth (age)	Caps	Club/province
Tom Coolican	Hooker	26 August 1988 (aged 25)	2	(England) Richmond
Zach Fenoglio	Hooker	29 July 1989 (aged 24)	7	(United States) Glendale Raptors
Phil Thiel	Hooker	29 October 1984 (aged 29)	19	(United States) Life University
TC Elliott	Prop		0	(United States) OPSB
Eric Fry	Prop	14 September 1987 (aged 26)	23	(England) Newcastle Falcons
Olive Kilifi	Prop	28 September 1986 (aged 27)	4	(United States) OPSB
Titi Lamositele	Prop	11 February 1995 (aged 19)	5	(England) Saracens
Shawn Pittman	Prop	22 January 1988 (aged 26)	30	(United States) OPSB
Nicholas Wallace	Prop	16 October 1989 (aged 24)	7	(Canada) James Bay
Nick Civetta	Lock	5 November 1989 (aged 24)	0	(Italy) Lazio Rugby
Brian Doyle	Lock	28 February 1984 (aged 30)	15	(United States) NYAC
Graham Harriman	Lock	23 February 1987 (aged 27)	4	(Canada) James Bay
Samu Manoa	Lock	5 March 1985 (aged 29)	7	(England) Northampton Saints
Hayden Smith	Lock	10 April 1985 (aged 29)	19	(England) Saracens
Louis Stanfill	Lock	30 May 1985 (aged 29)	45	(United States) OPSB
Tai Tuisamoa	Lock	28 August 1980 (aged 33)	2	(England) London Welsh
Todd Clever (c)	Flanker	16 January 1983 (aged 31)	56	(Japan) NTT Communications Shining Arcs
Scott LaValla	Flanker	4 July 1988 (aged 25)	23	(France) Stade Français
Ben Pinkelman	Flanker		0	(United States) Denver Barbarians
Kyle Sumsion	Flanker	24 January 1990 (aged 24)	2	(United States) Brigham Young Univ.
Danny Barrett	Number 8	23 March 1990 (aged 24)	0	(United States) SFGG
Cam Dolan	Number 8	7 March 1990 (aged 24)	8	(England) Northampton Saints
Matt Trouville	Number 8		0	(United States) OPSB
Nate Augspurger	Scrum-half		0	(United States) USA Eagles Sevens
Mike Petri	Scrum-half	16 August 1984 (aged 29)	41	(United States) NYAC
Garrett Brewer	Fly-half		0	(United States) Saint Mary's Gaels
Adam Siddall	Fly-half	27 July 1988 (aged 25)	6	(United States) Belmont Shore
Shalom Suniula	Fly-half	6 May 1988 (aged 26)	2	(United States) Belmont Shore
Troy Hall	Centre	16 February 1982 (age 44)	2	(United States) NYAC
Seamus Kelly	Centre	30 May 1991 (aged 23)	8	(United States) California Golden Bears
Chad London	Centre	27 September 1988 (aged 25)	0	(United States) Glendale Raptors
Folau Niua	Centre	27 January 1985 (aged 29)	6	(Scotland) Glasgow Warriors
Andrew Suniula	Centre	29 September 1982 (aged 31)	28	(England) London Wasps
Miles Craigwell	Wing	24 March 1986 (aged 28)	0	(United States) OPSB
Luke Hume	Wing	26 January 1988 (aged 26)	15	(France) RC Narbonne
Tim Maupin	Wing	23 March 1989 (aged 25)	3	(United States) Olympic Club
Thretton Palamo	Wing	22 September 1988 (aged 25)	3	(United States) University of Utah
Blaine Scully	Wing	29 February 1988 (aged 26)	17	(England) Leicester Tigers
Brett Thompson	Wing	16 August 1990 (aged 23)	0	(United States) Tempe RC
Chris Wyles	Fullback	13 September 1983 (aged 30)	41	(England) Saracens

== See also ==
- 2014 mid-year rugby union tests
- 2014 IRB Nations Cup
- 2014 IRB Tbilisi Cup
