= De La Salle College, Auckland =

De La Salle

Location
- 81 Gray Avenue, Māngere East, Auckland, New Zealand; 36°57′59″S 174°50′14″E

Information
- Type: State integrated, single-sex boys' secondary school (years 7–13)
- Motto: Latin: Bonum Certamen Certa (Fight The Good Fight of Faith)
- Established: 1953; 73 years ago
- Ministry of Education Institution no.: 94
- Principal: Myles Hogarty
- Enrolment: 971 (July 2026)
- Socio-economic decile: 1C
- Alumni: La Salle Collegians
- Website: delasalle.school.nz

De La Salle College is an integrated Catholic secondary boys' school in the south of Auckland, New Zealand. Established in 1953 by the De La Salle Brothers, it continues to educate young men in the Catholic faith and Christian values. In New Zealand there are two schools along with De La Salle College established by the Brothers in New Zealand, Francis Douglas Memorial College in New Plymouth and John Paul College in Rotorua. Students are encouraged to develop every aspect of their person and a strong emphasis is placed on excellence in academic study, cultural pride and sporting ability. Applicants need to be willing to support the Catholic character of the college.

== Philosophy ==
De La Salle College is a Lasallian educational institution, based on Christian and Catholic values. The college motto is "Fight the Good Fight of Faith". Prayer and worship are emphasised in the life of the college. The college students bear a crest on their uniform in the shape of a shield with a cross in the middle and the words 'Bonum Certamen Certa' which are the Latin words for the motto.

== History ==
De La Salle College was established in 1953.

In 2008 a new gymnasium was opened, replacing the previous gym, which was opened in 1969. Guests of honour included Prime Minister Helen Clark, Bishop Patrick Dunn, Manukau Mayor Len Brown, as well as past associates with the college. The old gym has been divided into technology suites and material workshops.

In 2012, former St Peters College deputy headmaster Myles Hogarty replaced Br David Miller as principal, ending a 60-year tradition of a De La Salle Brother principalship.

== Houses ==
The house system of De La Salle College places students into one of four houses, each named after a De La Salle Brother. This system is used for events such as inter-house athletics.

De La Salle College Houses:
Benildus	Named after De La Salle Brother Bénilde Romançon
Solomon	Named after De La Salle Brother Blessed Solomon Leclercq
Miguel	Named after De La Salle Brother Miguel Febres Cordero
Mutien	Named after De La Salle Brother Mutien-Marie Wiaux

== Sports ==
The school has taught many notable sportsmen. De La Salle has produced many great sporting talents including All Black great John Kirwan and Kiwi rugby league player Francis Leota. In recent times the most notable is All Black Isaia Toeava, Motu Tony (NZ Warriors, Kiwis) and Henry Fa'afili (NZ Warriors, Kiwis and Manu Samoa), Lesley Vainikolo (Canberra Raiders, Kiwis and England Rugby International), Junior Poluleuligaga (Waikato Chiefs, Manu Samoa), George Carmont (Newcastle Knights, Toa Samoa, Wigan Warriors), Jeff Lima (Melbourne Storm, Kiwis) and the late Sonny Fai (NZ Warriors).

The 2008 De La Salle 1st XV have had great success, winning not only the Auckland title, but the National title. The team traveled to Japan in 2009 for further competition.

=== Available sports ===
In winter, rugby, football, and basketball are offered. In the summer, volleyball, kilikiti, waka ama, softball, and cricket are offered. New Zealand Secondary Schools Rugby Champions 2008.

== Demographics ==
Last visited by Education Review Office (ERO) on 29 June 2016. The next review is scheduled within three years (2019).

De La Salle College had 996 students enrolled and all were males. Out of those, 66% were Samoan, 16% are Tongans, 8% Māori, 4% Cook Islands Māori, and 6% were of other ethnicity.

== Notable alumni ==
=== Education ===
- Patrick Lynch KNZM QSO – New Zealand Catholic education administrator.

=== Literary ===
- Ta'afuli Andrew Fiu – Author of Purple Heart, Random House 2006; motivational speaker.

=== Broadcasting ===
- Ric Salizzo – TV personality; SportsCafe presenter.

=== Public service ===
- Len Brown – Mayor of Auckland (2011–2016), Mayor of Manukau City (2007–2010)

=== Sport ===
==== Rugby league ====
- Isaak Ah Mau – player, Brisbane Broncos, North Queensland Cowboys
- Leeson Ah Mau – player, Junior Warriors and North Queensland Cowboys
- George Carmont – player, Newcastle Knights, Wigan Warriors and Samoa
- Henry Fa'afili – player, Warriors, Kiwis and Warrington
- Sonny Fai – player, Warriors
- Marvin Filipo – Warriors and Newcastle Knights
- Mark Ioane – player, Junior Warriors and Canberra Raiders
- Asu Kepaoa – Sydney Roosters and West Tigers
- Edward Kosi – NZ Warriors
- Mark Leafa – South Sydney, Sydney Roosters, Leigh Centurions and Castleford Tigers
- Francis Leota – player, Sheffield, Salford, Samoa and Kiwis
- Jeff Lima – player, Melbourne Storm and Kiwis
- Constantine Mika – player, Newcastle Knights
- Frank-Paul Nuuasala – player, Sydney Roosters, Canberra Raiders
- Ofahiki Ogden – player, Nrl Canterbury-Bankstown Bulldogs and Parramatta Eels
- Taniela Otukolo – NZ Warriors and Redcliffe Dolphins
- Tai Savea – player, Samoa
- Demitric Sifakula – NZ Warriors
- Jason Taumalolo – player, North Queensland Cowboys
- Motu Tony – player, Warriors, Kiwis and Hull FC
- Francis Tualau – player, Nrl Canterbury-Bankstown Bulldogs
- Honeti Tuha – Parramatta eels
- Paul Tuli – NZ Warriors and Junior Kiwis
- Demitric Vaimauga – NZ Warriors
- Lesley Vainikolo – player, Canberra, Bradford and Kiwis. England rugby union representative

==== Rugby union ====
- Tomas Aoake – San Diego Legion, Tasman and North Harbour Bunnings NPC
- Daniel Crichton – Otago
- Vaiolini Ekuasi – Auckland Blues and Melbourne Rebels
- Jonny Fa'amatuainu – player, Manu Samoa
- Piula Fa'asalele – player, Manu Samoa
- Johnny Fa'auli – player, Chiefs and Toshiba Brave Lupus
- Auvasa Faleali'i – Auckland, Bay of Plenty, Nevers (France) and Manu Samoa
- Sir John Kirwan – former Auckland and All Blacks player, current rugby coach
- Timothy Lafaele – player, Japan National Rugby Team and Tokyo Sunwolves
- Lalomilo Lalomilo – Bay of Plenty and Chiefs
- Fa'atiga Lemalu – player, Manu Samoa
- Taniela Moa – player, Auckland Blues and Tonga
- Melani Nanai – player, Auckland Blues and Worcester Warriors
- Dwayne Polataivao – Manu Samoa and Moana Pasifika
- Junior Polu – player, Manu Samoa
- Savelio Ropati – Bay of Plenty, Counties Manukau and Manu Samoa 7s
- Male Sa'u – Melbourne Rebels, Blues and Japan
- Sherwin Stowers – player, NZ Sevens, Auckland Blues
- Jamie-Jerry Taulagi – player, Queensland Reds and Sunwolves teams in Super Rugby and Agen in the French Top 14
- Isaia Toeava – player, Auckland Blues and All Blacks
- Alfie To'oala – player, Manu Samoa
- Hendrik Tui – Panasonic Wild Knights, Suntory Sungoliath and Queensland Reds.
- Ma'ave Joseph Tupe – NZ Rugby 7s, Bay of Plenty and Coco-Cola Red Sparks
- Wallace Sititi - player, Chiefs and All Blacks
- Kitiona Vai - New Zealand 7s
- Melanie Nanai - Auckland, Auckland Blues, Canterbury Crusaders, Manu Samoa, Barbarians

==== Football ====
- Mark Atkinson – former All Whites player

==== Professional wrestling ====
- Fale Simitaitoko – professional wrestler signed to New Japan Pro-Wrestling

== See also ==
- Jean-Baptiste de La Salle
- De La Salle
- Lasallian educational institutions
