= Takashi Kikutani =

Japanese rugby union player

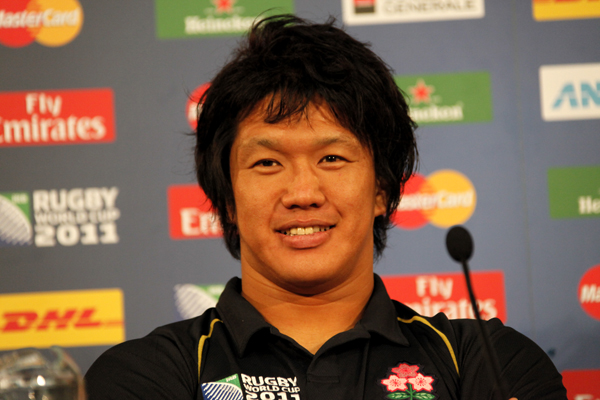
- Kikutani at a press conference during the 2011 Rugby World Cup
- Born: 24 February 1980 (age 46)
- Height: 187 cm (6 ft 2 in)
- Weight: 106 kg (16 st 10 lb)
- School: Imperial Palace Technical High School
- University: Osaka University of Health and Sport Sciences

Rugby union career
- Position(s): Flanker, Number 8, Lock
Senior career
Years	Team	Apps	(Points)
2004–2013	Toyota Verblitz	114	(225)
2013–2014	Saracens	0	(0)
2014–2018	Canon Eagles	37	(15)
- Correct as of 15 January 2017
International career
Years	Team	Apps	(Points)
2005–2014	Japan	68	(160)
National sevens team
Years	Team		Comps
	Japan		16

Takashi Kikutani (菊谷 崇, Kikutani Takashi; born 24 February 1980 in Nara) is a Japanese rugby union player, who plays at number 8 or flanker for Canon Eagles and previously Toyota Verblitz. He also represented Japan at international level, and is the second highest try scorer for a forward of all time.

== Professional career ==
Kikutani first played for the Japan 7s team in 1999 and represented them at the 2005 Rugby World Cup Sevens before making his debut for Japan in November 2005 against Spain where he scored a try. He established himself in the side through 2006 but was ruled out of the 2007 Rugby World Cup with a knee injury.

After recovering from injury, he returned to the side and took over Takuro Miuchi as captain in November 2008 by coach John Kirwan, and led the side until the end of the 2011 Rugby World Cup.

After a disappointing tournament for Japan, he was replaced as captain by Toshiaki Hirose and initially left out the squad altogether by new coach Eddie Jones, but soon returned for the 2012 Pacific Nations Cup, and re-established himself as vice captain to Hirose, and was singled out by Jones as one of the few Japanese players who has the attitude and physicality to be able to "smash" players. He dropped off the international scene in 2014.

Kikutani finished his international career as the second highest try scorer of all time by a forward with 32 tries, with only Diego Ormaechea of Uruguay having scored more.

At domestic level, Kikutani played most of his career at Toyota Verblitz, and has twice been named in Top League team of the season in 2009–10 and 2012–13. He left the club in December 2013 to join Saracens on a training contract, before returning to Japan with the Canon Eagles.
