= Taniela Otukolo =

Tongan rugby league footballer

Nella Otukolo
Personal information
- Full name: Taniela Otukolo
- Born: 22 May 2002 (age 23); Tofoa, Tonga
- Height: 179 cm (5 ft 10 in)
- Weight: 91 kg (14 st 5 lb)

Playing information
- Position: Hooker
Club
Years	Team	Pld	T	G	FG	P
2021–22	New Zealand Warriors	9	0	0	0	0
Representative
Years	Team	Pld	T	G	FG	P
2022	Tonga	1	0	0	0	0
- Source: As of 5 June 2022

Taniela Otukolo (born 22 May 2002) is a Tongan professional rugby league footballer who last played as a hooker for the New Zealand Warriors in the National Rugby League (NRL). He attended De La Salle College, Mangere East for all his college years.

== Background ==
"Nella" Otukolo was born in Tofoa, Tongatapu, Tonga.

He played his junior rugby league for the Otahuhu Leopards.

== Playing career ==
In round 15 of the 2021 NRL season, Otukolo made his first grade debut for the Warriors against the Newcastle Knights.
