= Isake Katonibau =

- Full name: Isake Camaibau Katonibau
- Born: 27 May 1983 (age 43) Suva, Fiji
- Height: 6 ft 3 in (191 cm)
- Weight: 210 lb (95 kg)

Rugby union career
- Position: Centre
International career
Years	Team	Apps	(Points)
2012	Fiji	3	(5)
Medal record
Rugby sevens
Pacific Games
Gold medal – first place	2015 Port Moresby	Men's tournament

Isake Camaibau Katonibau (born 27 May 1983) is a Fijian former rugby union international.

== Early life and education ==
Katonibau was born in Suva and educated at Marist Brothers High School.

== Career ==
In 2012, Katonibau was capped three times for the Flying Fijians in the Pacific Nations Cup. He made his appearances as a centre and scored a try on debut in a win over Japan in Nagoya.

Katonibau is a former captain of the Fiji rugby sevens team and was a member of the side that won the 2015 Hong Kong Sevens tournament. He was a forward in rugby sevens.

Injury problems caused Katonibau to be withdrawn from the sevens squad for the 2016 Summer Olympics and an assault charge in 2018, for allegedly striking a police officer, caused further interruptions to his career.

== See also ==
- List of Fiji national rugby union players
