= Seremaia Naureuere =

Fijian rugby union player (born 1987)

Seremaia Naureure
- Full name: Seremaia Naureure Namaraevu
- Born: 11 May 1987 (age 39) Vunidawa, Fiji

Rugby union career
- Position: Hooker
International career
Years	Team	Apps	(Points)
2012–13	Fiji	9	

Seremaia Naureure Namaraevu (born 11 May 1987) is a Fijian former international rugby union player.

Naureure hails from Lutu, Wainibuka, and is a younger brother of ex–Naitasiri captain Apisai Rinamalo.

A hooker, Naureure debuted for Fiji in a win over Japan in Nagoya during the 2012 Pacific Nations Cup. His nine Fiji caps included an appearance off the bench against England at Twickenham.

Naureure had 14 years of service for Nadroga and finished his career playing with Naitasiri.

== See also ==
- List of Fiji national rugby union players
