= Iliesa Ratuva =

Fijian international rugby union player (born 1980)

- Born: 19 March 1980 (age 46)
- Height: 6 ft 2 in (188 cm)
- Weight: 220 lb (100 kg)

Rugby union career
- Position: Flanker
International career
Years	Team	Apps	(Points)
2012–13	Fiji	8	(5)

Iliesa Ratuva (born 19 March 1980) is a Fijian former international rugby union player.

A policeman by profession, Ratuva was a product of the Nadroga colts and under-23 sides. He made his debut for Fiji during the 2012 IRB Pacific Nations Cup and was capped eight times in total, primarily as a flanker. His caps included an appearance against England at Twickenham. Retiring at the end of 2016, Ratuva bowed out of rugby with successful defences of the Farebrother-Sullivan Trophy and Skipper Cup playing for Nadroga.

== See also ==
- List of Fiji national rugby union players
