= Misioka Timoteo =

Samoa international rugby union player

- Full name: Misioka Maluapapa Timoteo
- Born: 26 November 1988 (age 37)
- Height: 6 ft 2 in (188 cm)
- Weight: 220 lb (100 kg)

Rugby union career
- Position: Loose forward / Prop
International career
Years	Team	Apps	(Points)
2009–14	Samoa	6	(0)

Misioka Maluapapa Timoteo (born 26 November 1988) is a Samoan former international rugby union player.

A forward, Timoteo could play a variety of positions in the scrum and was capped six times for Samoa, including matches against France and Italy on their 2009 end-of-year tour to Europe.

Timoteo won a Polish championship with Lechia Gdańsk in 2012–13 and was named "Best on Ground" in South Darwin's 2016 premiership win. He also played Queensland first-grade rugby for Wests and with Brisbane City in the National Rugby Championship.

== See also ==
- List of Samoa national rugby union players
