= Ben Masoe =

Samoan rugby player (born 1986)

- Born: 9 March 1986 (age 40)
- Height: 5 ft 11 in (180 cm)
- Weight: 242 lb (110 kg)

Rugby union career
- Position: Back-row
Provincial / State sides
Years	Team	Apps	(Points)
2011	Auckland	3	(0)
International career
Years	Team	Apps	(Points)
2012	Samoa	4	(0)

Ben Masoe (born 9 March 1986) is a Samoan former rugby union international.

Masoe was educated at Chanel College outside Apia.

After a standout season with Papatoetoe, Masoe played provincial rugby for Auckland in 2011.

Masoe, a loose forward, won four Samoa caps in 2012. He featured in all three matches for Samoa in their title-winning Pacific Nations Cup campaign, then was a starting flanker in a home Test against Scotland.

Before retiring, Masoe had three years as captain of the Bombay rugby club.

== See also ==
- List of Samoa national rugby union players
