= Daniel Crichton =

- Full name: Daniel Francis Crichton
- Born: 22 October 1985 (age 41) Wellington, New Zealand
- Height: 6 ft 6 in (198 cm)
- Weight: 240 lb (109 kg)
- School: De La Salle College

Rugby union career
- Position: Back-row
Provincial / State sides
Years	Team	Apps	(Points)
2005	Auckland	2	(0)
2006–07	Counties Manukau	9	(0)
2009	Tasman	5	(0)
International career
Years	Team	Apps	(Points)
2012	Samoa	4	(0)

Daniel Francis Crichton (born 22 October 1985) is a New Zealand-born Samoan former international rugby union player.

== Biography ==
Born in Wellington, Crichton was educated at Auckland's De La Salle College and represented New Zealand at under-19s level, featuring in a World Championship-winning team in 2004.

Crichton played his rugby as a loose forward and occasional lock. He competed in New Zealand provincial rugby for Auckland, Counties Manukau and Tasman. In 2012, Crichton played Test rugby with Samoa and was in the side that won the Pacific Nations Cup. He had overseas stints with Gran Ducato Parma in Italy and Farul Constanța in Romania.

== See also ==
- List of Samoa national rugby union players
