= Mafileo Kefu =

Tonga international rugby union player

Mafi Kefu
- Born: Mafileo Kefu; 5 February 1983 (age 43) Brisbane, Australia
- Height: 1.80 m (5 ft 11 in)
- Weight: 104 kg (229 lb)
- School: Brisbane State High School
- Notable relative: Toutai Kefu (brother)

Rugby union career
- Position: Centre
Senior career
Years	Team	Apps	(Points)
2005–2007	US Dax	41	(25)
2007–2011	Toulon	81	(85)
Provincial / State sides
Years	Team	Apps	(Points)
2012–2013	Bay of Plenty	9	(5)
Super Rugby
Years	Team	Apps	(Points)
2003	Reds	1	(5)
International career
Years	Team	Apps	(Points)
2012–	Tonga	3	(0)
- Correct as of 23 June 2012

Mafileo Kefu (born 5 February 1983 in Brisbane, Australia) is a rugby union footballer who played for RC Toulon and US Dax in France. He is the younger brother of former Wallabies number eight Toutai Kefu and Centre Steve Kefu, and son of Tongan Rugby star Fatai Kefu. After leaving France, he played at Bay of Plenty in New Zealand, and then returned to Souths in Brisbane after returning to Australia in 2012.
