= Ki Anufe =

Samoan rugby union player (born 1987)

- Born: 12 April 1987 (age 39)
- Height: 1.85 m (6 ft 1 in)
- Weight: 94 kg (207 lb; 14 st 11 lb)

Rugby union career
- Position: Fly-half
Provincial / State sides
Years	Team	Apps	(Points)
2013	Counties Manukau	6	(28)
International career
Years	Team	Apps	(Points)
2009–13	Samoa	6	(40)

Ki Anufe (born 12 April 1987) is a Samoan former international rugby union player.

== Rugby career ==
A fly-half, Anufe was capped six times for Samoa, making his debut in 2009. He was Samoa's top point scorer in their 2012 IRB Pacific Nations Cup triumph, with 34 points off his boot. While playing his rugby for Bombay, Anufe made six appearances in New Zealand provincial rugby with Counties Manukau in 2013. He had an overseas stint at Spanish club Santboiana 2015 and helped the club reach the División de Honor de Rugby final.

== See also ==
- List of Samoa national rugby union players
