= Jeremy Su'a =

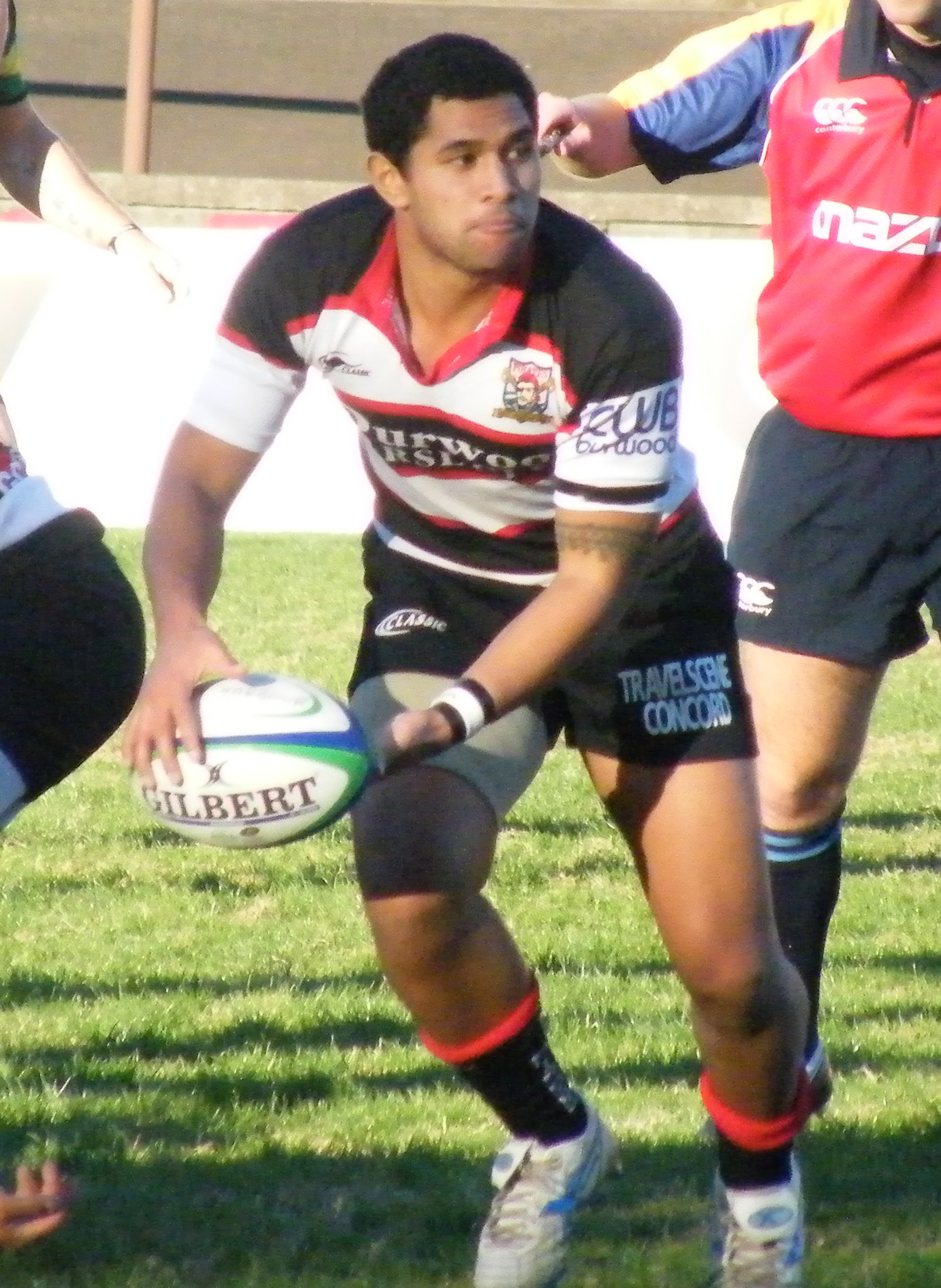
- Jeremy Su'a
- Born: Jeremy Su'a; 10 November 1988 (age 38) Wellington, New Zealand
- Height: 1.77 m (5 ft 9 1/2 in)
- Weight: 92 kg (14 st 7 lb)
- School: Westfields Sports High School

Rugby union career
- Position: Scrum-Half
Senior career
Years	Team	Apps	(Points)
2013–14	Worcester Warriors	16	(5)
2014−	Petrarca	7	(5)
- Correct as of 27 January 2015
Provincial / State sides
Years	Team	Apps	(Points)
2012	Tasman	11	(0)
- Correct as of 3 November 2012
Super Rugby
Years	Team	Apps	(Points)
2013	Crusaders	0	(0)
International career
Years	Team	Apps	(Points)
2011–2014	Samoa	15	(0)
2008	Australia U-20	3	(6)
2007	Australia U-19	4	(3)
2006	Australia Schoolboys	3	
- Correct as of 14 November 2013

Jeremy Su'a (born 10 November 1988) is a Samoan rugby union footballer. Su'a attended Westfields Sports High School in Sydney's South West alongside Tongan International Sitiveni Mafi and the likes of rugby league superstars Jarryd Hayne and Israel Folau. Su'a played his Junior rugby at the Parramatta Two Blues Rugby club and in 2006 played for the Australian Schoolboys. Moving through the age groups Su'a was a member of the Australian U19 team in 2007 and Australian U20 Team in 2008. He currently plays for the Worcester Warriors in the Aviva Premiership and Samoa, and usually plays as a scrum-half. He was part of the Samoan team at the 2011 Rugby World Cup where he played in two matches. He played for Sydney University 1st Grade Colts Under 21’s competition 2008 He made his 1st Grade debut with Penrith Emus 1st Grade in 2009 in the Shute Shield competition, where he played a further 2 seasons for Penrith Emus from 2010-2011 in the Shute Shield competition.

Su'a was named in the Crusaders squad for the 2013 Super Rugby season but played no super rugby matches. He signed with the Worcester Warriors for the 2013/2014 season.
