= Josefa Domolailai =

Fiji international rugby union player

- Full name: Joseva Ulago Domolailai
- Born: 11 December 1985 (age 40) Sigatoka, Fiji
- Height: 6 ft 6 in (198 cm)
- Weight: 253 lb (115 kg)

Rugby union career
- Position: Flanker / Lock
Senior career
Years	Team	Apps	(Points)
2007–08	USA Limoges		
2008–09	Petrarca Padova		
2009–11	AC Bobigny		
2011–12	FC Auch		
2012–16	Section Paloise		
2016–18	US Carcassonne		
2018–20	Rouen Normandie		
International career
Years	Team	Apps	(Points)
2008–12	Fiji	13	(10)

Joseva Ulago Domolailai (born 11 December 1985) is a Fijian former international rugby union player.

== Rugby career ==
Born in Sigatoka, Domolailai was primarily a back-row forward, capped 13 times for Fiji. He made his early international appearances as a lock, debuting against Tonga during Fiji's 2008 IRB Pacific Nations Cup campaign. His career included a Test against Scotland at Murrayfield, where he had to be stretchered off with a broken ankle.

Domolailai joined French club USA Limoges in 2007 and aside from one season in Italian rugby spent his entire career in France, also playing for AC Bobigny, FC Auch, Section Paloise, US Carcassonne and Rouen Normandie. He played some rugby in the Top 14 during his time in Pau and won a Pro D2 title with the club in 2015.

== See also ==
- List of Fiji national rugby union players
