= Setefano Somoca =

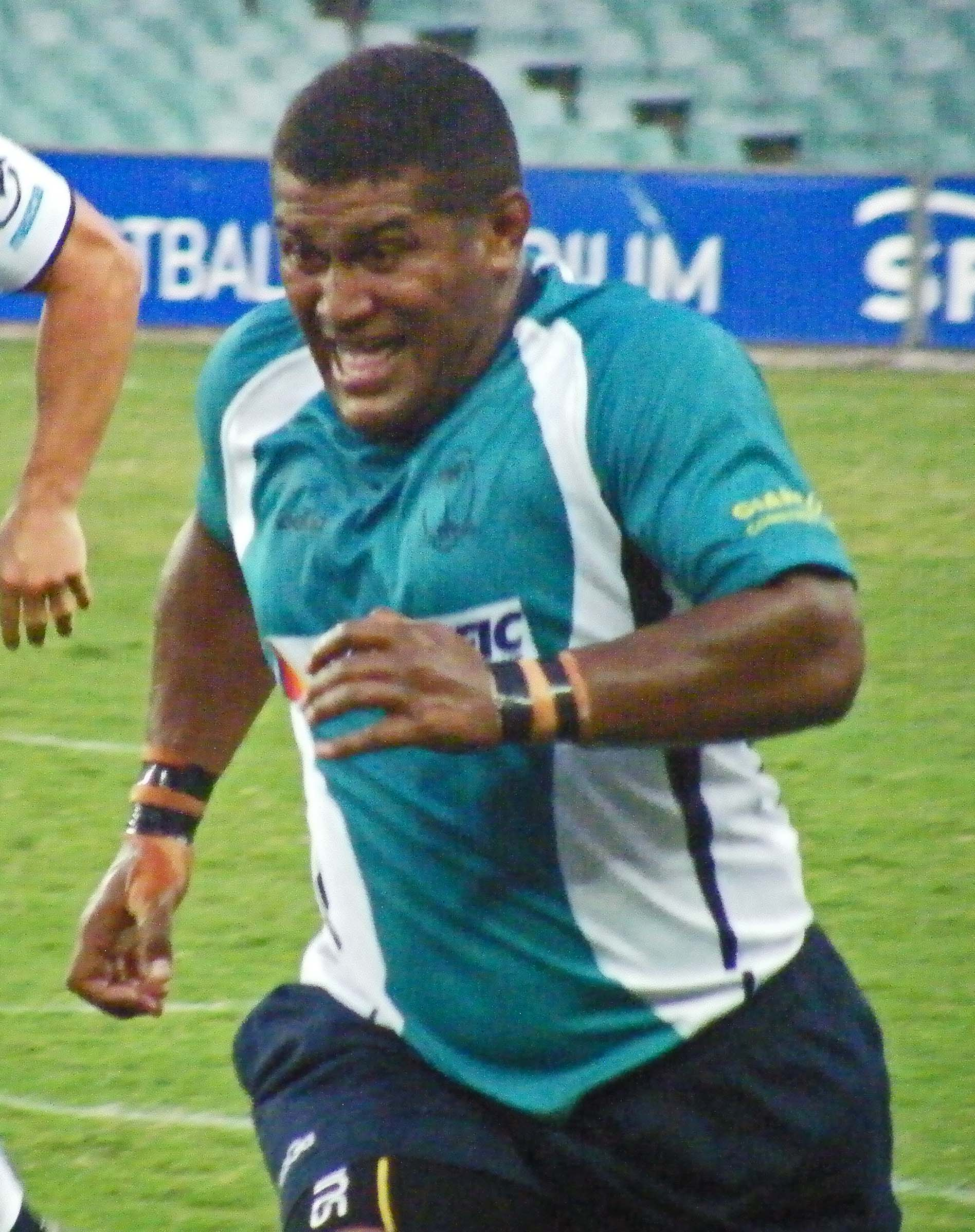
- Born: February 10, 1981 (age 45)
- Height: 1.85 m (6 ft 1 in)
- Weight: 122 kg (269 lb; 19.2 st)

Rugby union career
- Position: Prop
International career
Years	Team	Apps	(Points)
2011-	Fiji	8	(0)

Setefano Somoca (born 10 February 1981) is a Fijian rugby union footballer. He currently plays for the Nadroga rugby team and the Fiji national rugby union team and usually plays as a prop. He was part of the Fiji team at the 2011 Rugby World Cup where he played in two matches.
