= Simeli Koniferedi =

Fiji international rugby union player (born 1984)

- Full name: Isimeli Seinigi Koniferedi
- Born: 28 August 1984 (age 42) Sigatoka, Fiji
- Height: 5 ft 8 in (173 cm)
- Weight: 191 lb (87 kg)

Rugby union career
- Position: Fullback / Wing
Provincial / State sides
Years	Team	Apps	(Points)
2012	King Country	9	(30)
2013–14	North Otago	18	(20)
International career
Years	Team	Apps	(Points)
2012–13	Fiji	7	(0)

Isimeli Seinigi Koniferedi (born 28 August 1984) is a Fijian former rugby union international.

Koniferedi, born in Sigatoka, was a fullback and winger, capped seven times for Fiji from 2012 to 2013. He played against England at Twickenham in 2012 and was a member of Fiji's winning 2013 Pacific Nations Cup campaign.

While based in New Zealand, Koniferedi played provincial rugby for King Country and North Otago. He competed for Kurow during his time on the south island and later turned out for Wanganui Marist.

== See also ==
- List of Fiji national rugby union players
