= Kelepi Ketedromo =

- Full name: Kelepi Rokoua Ketedromo
- Born: 24 March 1981 (age 45)
- Height: 6 ft 2 in (188 cm)
- Weight: 218 lb (99 kg)

Rugby union career
- Position: Loose forward
International career
Years	Team	Apps	(Points)
2010–12	Fiji	5	(0)

Kelepi Rokoua Ketedromo (born 24 March 1981) is a Fijian former international rugby union player.

Raised in Vaturova, Cakaudrove Province, Ketedromo began playing rugby in primary school. He undertook his secondary schooling in Labasa, at Labasa College and then All Saints Secondary School.

Ketedromo played for the Navoci club after moving to Nadi and made his first national representative team as a Fiji Warriors representative at the 2009 Pacific Rugby Cup. Between 2010 and 2012, Ketedromo was capped five times for the full national side, primarily as a number eight. He captained the Fiji Warriors at the 2012 Pacific Rugby Cup in Australia.

== See also ==
- List of Fiji national rugby union players
