= Talemaitoga Tuapati =

Fijian rugby union footballer (born 1985)

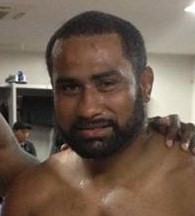
- Tuapati post match representing Fiji
- Full name: Talemaitoga Dautu Tuapati
- Born: 16 August 1985 (age 41) Suva, Fiji
- Height: 180 cm (5 ft 11 in)
- Weight: 107 kg (236 lb; 16 st 12 lb)
- School: Ratu Kadavulevu School

Rugby union career
- Position: Hooker
- Current team: Southland
Senior career
Years	Team	Apps	(Points)
2012–	Southland	25	(5)
2015	Stade Français	1	(0)
2015–2019	Provence	69	(65)
2019–2020	Carcassonne	16	(10)
- Correct as of 7 September 2020
International career
Years	Team	Apps	(Points)
2010–2018	Fiji	43	(15)
- Correct as of 7 September 2020

Talemaitoga Tuapati is a Fijian rugby union footballer. He plays hooker for the Woodlands rugby club and for Southland in New Zealand. Tuapati's selection to the Fijian squad came in 2010 after impressing selectors on the watch at the Pacific Rugby Cup tournament which included club teams from Fiji, Tonga and Samoa. He played at the 2014 Pacific Nations Cup.

Tuapati was selected in 2015 for Fiji by head coach John Mckee for the Pacific Nations Cup and World Cup in the UK.

In 2015 Tuapati was signed by Stade Français on a three-month deal as an injury replacement for Laurent Sempéré.
