= Waisea Nailago =

Fijian rugby union footballer

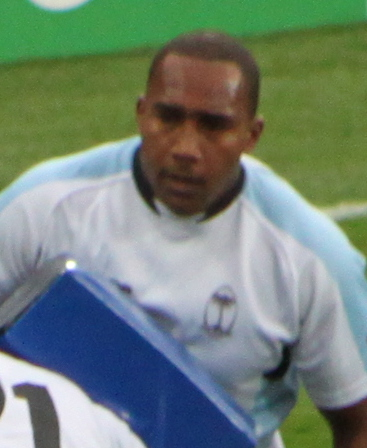
- Born: 28 March 1989 (age 37)
- Height: 1.93 m (6 ft 4 in)
- Weight: 108 kg (238 lb; 17.0 st)

Rugby union career
- Position: Prop
Senior career
Years	Team	Apps	(Points)
- CSM Baia Mare
International career
Years	Team	Apps	(Points)
2011-2012	Fiji	9	(0)

Waisea Nailago (born 28 March 1989) is a Fijian rugby union footballer. He plays for the Suva rugby team and usually plays as a prop. He was part of the Fiji team at the 2011 Rugby World Cup.
