= Waisea Nayacalevu =

Fiji international rugby union player

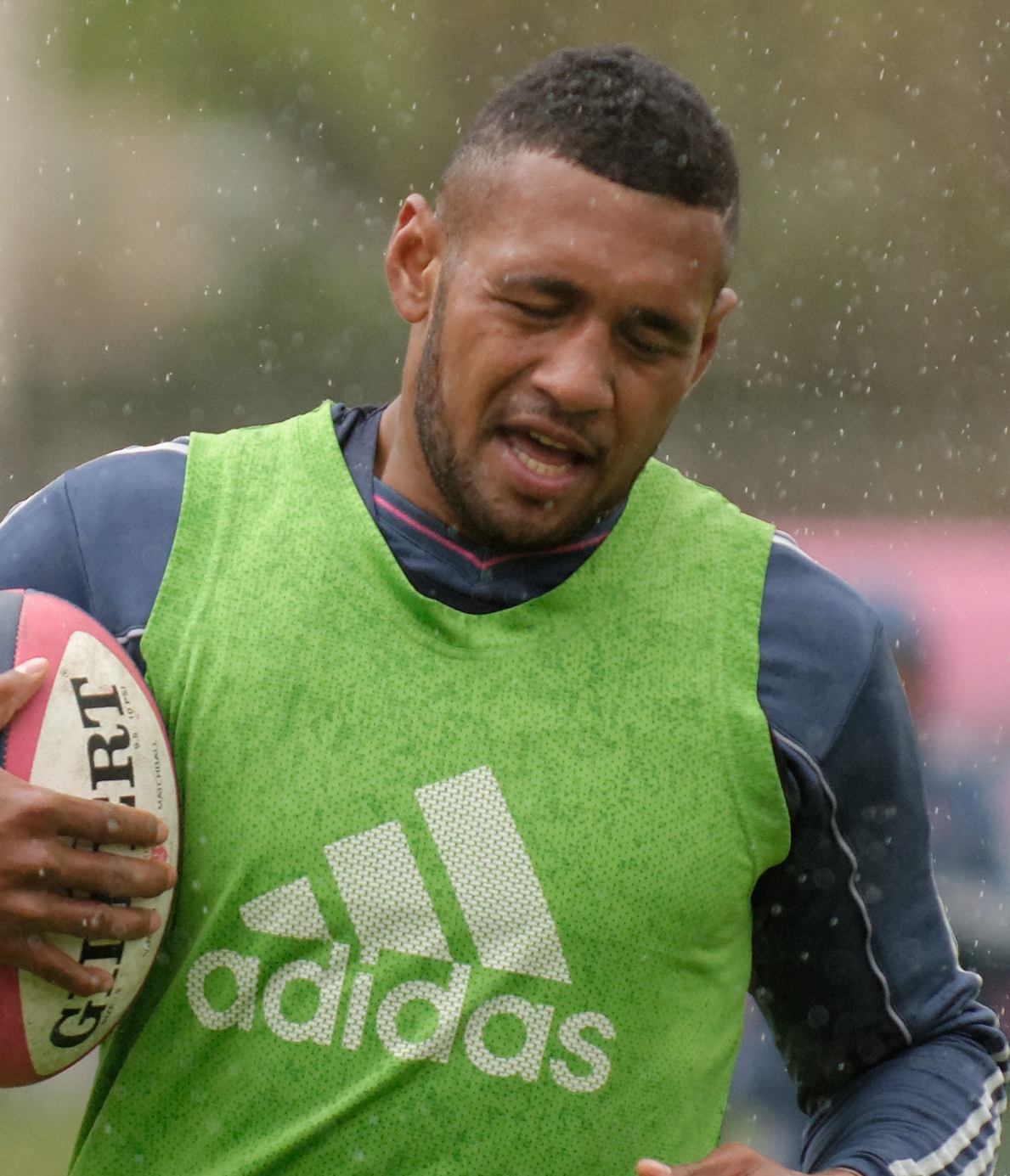
- Nayacalevu representing Stade Français during the Top 14
- Full name: Waisea Nayacalevu Vuidravuwalu
- Born: 26 June 1990 (age 36) Navua, Fiji
- Height: 1.93 m (6 ft 4 in)
- Weight: 105 kg (231 lb; 16 st 7 lb)
- School: Lomary Secondary School

Rugby union career
- Position(s): Centre, Wing
- Current team: Toulon
Senior career
Years	Team	Apps	(Points)
2012–2022	Stade Français	200	(410)
2022–2024	Toulon	20	(35)
2024–2025	Sale Sharks	7	(0)
2025	Ospreys	0	(0)
- Correct as of 4 August 2023
International career
Years	Team	Apps	(Points)
2012–	Fiji	40	(95)
- Correct as of 4 August 2023
National sevens team
Years	Team		Comps
2012–2016	Fiji		9
- Correct as of 4 August 2023

Waisea Nayacalevu Vuidravuwalu (born 26 June 1990) is a Fijian professional rugby union player who plays as a centre for Premiership Rugby club Sale Sharks and captains the Fiji national team.

== Club career ==
Waisea, along with his brother, Avenisi Vasuinubu both played for Melbourne Rugby in the Victoria Rugby Championships. The brothers decided to join the Uprising team in the Uprising 7's tournament held in Fiji in 2012.

He was signed on by French side Stade Français after his performance in the PNC and he made his debut against Montpellier in August 2012. After 10 years in Paris, Waisea signs for Top 14 rivals Toulon on a two-year deal ahead of the 2022–23 season.

On 16 March 2024, Waisea would move to England to sign for Sale Sharks in the Premiership Rugby competition ahead of the 2024–25 season.

== International career ==
He played so well at club level that both himself and his brother were selected to join the Fiji 7's team for the 2011–12 IRB Sevens World Series. Waisea was one of the stand-out performers that season scoring 25 tries that season equal with another rising star, Metuisela Talebula. He was selected in the Fiji 15's team for the 2012 IRB Pacific Nations Cup. He made his debut for Fiji against Japan on the right wing and scored a try as well. He scored a try against Scotland two weeks later. In May 2013, he returned to Fiji to try to win his place back to represent the Fiji 7's team at the 2013 Rugby World Cup Sevens.

Since 2021, he has been sharing the captaincy duties for the Flying Fijians with Levani Botia and Semi Radradra.

Selected to be the captain of the Flying Fijians in their historic victory over England in the warm-up match in 2023 at Twickenham Stadium and also led Fiji to the 2023 Rugby World Cup in France where they reached the quarterfinal after 16 years.

== Controversies ==
On July 22, 2017, he decided to celebrate the birthday of his teammate Josaia Raisuqe drinking at a club. They both left the club intoxicated and on the way they met a woman, Raisuqe grabbed the woman and physically molested her by fondling her breasts. Her friends tried to help but both Raisuqe and Nayacalevu punched them. Raisuqe and Nayacalevu were picked up by police at around 3am and spent the whole day in jail. They were taken to court two days later and a trial date was set for 29 November.

On 18 August, Stade Français Paris fired Raisuqe for "gross misconduct" and gave Nayacalevu a formal warning.

During the 2023 Rugby World Cup when he was the captain of the Fiji teams, right after the pool match against Portugal where Fiji lost, he swore at the journalists who were asking him questions in i-taukei language.

In January 2024, RC Toulon refused to extend his contract due to reasons they did not make public, after not playing rugby for nearly 4 months, the then Fiji national coach, Simon Raiwalui added him to the national team and made him captain which was controversial as he had no club and had not played rugby for 5 months but Raiwalui who treated Nayacalevu like his "God son" still added him to the national team and made him captain. Raiwalui then had a talk with his old teammate at Sale Sharks, the current Sale Sharks' Director of Rugby, Alex Sanderson for a favour and he signed Nayacalevu to Sharks in March 2024. but after playing a handful of games and having some poor matches, he was dropped and in January 2025, news claimed he signed for French 3rd Division side Nice after this Premiership season but a month later, Sale Sharks confirmed they dropped Nayacalevu and was picked by URC Side Ospreys for the remainder of the URC season.

He would leave the Ospreys one month later without playing a game.
