= Watisoni Votu =

Fiji international rugby union player

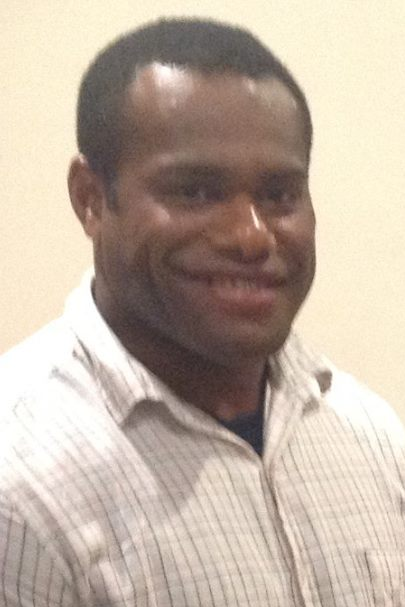
- Votu in 2014
- Born: Watisoni Votu; 25 March 1985 (age 41) Lautoka, Fiji
- Height: 1.87 m (6 ft 1 1/2 in)
- Weight: 93 kg (14 st 9 lb)
- Notable relative: Kaminieli Rasaku (nephew)

Rugby union career
- Position: Wing/ Centre
Senior career
Years	Team	Apps	(Points)
2012−13	Exeter Chiefs	7	(10)2t)
2013−2015	Perpignan	36	(30)
2015−2021	Pau	100	(200)
2021-	AS Béziers Hérault	79	(60)
- Correct as of 14 June 2015
International career
Years	Team	Apps	(Points)
2012−	Fiji	13	(25)
- Correct as of 17 November 2019
National sevens team
Years	Team		Comps
2009	Fiji		2

Watisoni Votu (born 25 March 1985 in Lautoka, Fiji) is a Fijian rugby union player. He plays Wing or Centre for Fiji on international level and at club level for AS Béziers Hérault in Pro D2. Watisoni also played for the province, Lautoka. Following a series of visa complications Votu's transfer was delayed to English Aviva Premiership side Exeter Chiefs.

Watisoni Votu got to be a part of the Fiji Sevens team in 2009 for the 2008-09 IRB 7s World Series.

In February 2012, Votu trialled with rugby league team, Newcastle Knights in hope of a contract but instead chose to consider offers from overseas.

Votu made his debut for Fiji in 2012 against Japan in the Pacific Nations Cup. He then was named in the sides 2012 end of year tour campaign. Votu took part in all four matches, playing against Gloucester, Ireland XV, Georgia and England.

Votu transfer to Exeter was completed on 9 January 2013. This took Exeter even longer due to an incident that took place in Levuka Town in Ovalau, Fiji in which Votu allegedly assaulted a woman. It was announced on 20 April 2013 that Votu at the conclusion of the 2012/2013 season will join French side USA Perpignan.

In April 2015, Votu signed for newly promoted Top 14 side, Pau.

After 6 years with Pau, Votu signed for Pro D2 side, AS Béziers Hérault.
