= Logovi'i Mulipola =

Samoa international rugby union player (born 1987)

- Born: Logovi'i Mulipola; 11 March 1987 (age 39) Manono Island, Samoa
- Height: 1.87 m (6 ft 1 1/2 in)
- Weight: 130 kg (20 st 7 lb; 287 lb)

Rugby union career
- Position: Prop
- Current team: Doncaster Knights
Senior career
Years	Team	Apps	(Points)
2012–2018	Leicester Tigers	131	(35)
2018–2023	Newcastle Falcons	64	(15)
2020	Gloucester (loan)	4	(0)
2023	Montpellier	0	(0)
2023–2024	Saracens	6	(0)
2024-	Doncaster Knights	0	(0)
- Correct as of 6 December 2023
International career
Years	Team	Apps	(Points)
2009–	Samoa	33	(5)
- Correct as of 20 November 2021

Logovi'i Mulipola (born 11 March 1987) is a Samoan rugby player who plays prop for Doncaster Knights in the RFU Championship.

== Club career ==
Mulipola joined Leicester Tigers on trial in November 2011 and made his debut as a replacement on 7 January 2012 against London Wasps in a Premiership game at Welford Road Stadium. On 11 January 2012 he signed a contract until the end of the 2012 season. Mulipola started the 2012 Anglo-Welsh Cup final as Leicester beat Northampton, he was a used as a 73rd minute replacement in the 2012 Premiership Final where Leicester lost to Harlequins.

For the 2012 ITM Cup, Mulipola signed with Hawke's Bay, for a six-month contract deal. This only became clear to Leicester Tigers after they signed him after his trial with the club. On 25 April 2012 it was announced Mulipola would not be joining Hawke's Bay and instead signed a new deal with Leicester to keep him in England.

Mulipola started the 2013 Premiership Final at loosehead for Leicester as they beat Northampton to become English champions. Injury has restricted Mulipola to just 19 starts across three seasons from 2015–18.

On 19 April 2018 it was announced Mulipola had signed for Newcastle Falcons, another Premiership side, for the 2018–19 season.

He joined Gloucester on a short-term deal in July 2020. He returned to Newcastle ahead of the 2020–21 season. He is currently contracted to remain at Newcastle until at least the end of the 2022–23 season. He left Newcastle upon the completion of his deal.

In July 2023, he was signed by Montpellier as a World Cup Joker.

In December 2023, he was signed by Saracens on a short-term deal as injury cover. In February 2024, he extended his deal with the club to the end of the season.

In preparation for the 2024/25 season, Logovi'i will play for Doncaster Knights in the RFU Championship.

== International career ==
Mulipola made his debut for Samoa against Papua New Guinea on 18 July 2009 and represented Samoa in the 2011 Rugby World Cup, where he came off the bench for 2 minutes against South Africa.

On 23 August 2019, he was named in Samoa's 34-man training squad for the 2019 Rugby World Cup, before being named in the final 31 on 31 August.

=== International tries ===
As of 20 November 2021

Try	Opposing team	Location	Venue	Competition	Date	Result	Score
1	United States	San Sebastián, Spain	Anoeta Stadium	2018 end-of-year rugby union internationals	10 November 2018	Loss	30 – 29

== Personal life ==
Mulipola has twin sons with the sister of Martin Castrogiovanni.

On 16 February 2018 Mulipola represented Samoa at a reception hosted by Queen Elizabeth II at Buckingham Palace to celebrate the achievements of the Commonwealth diaspora.
