= David Lemi =

Samoa international rugby union player

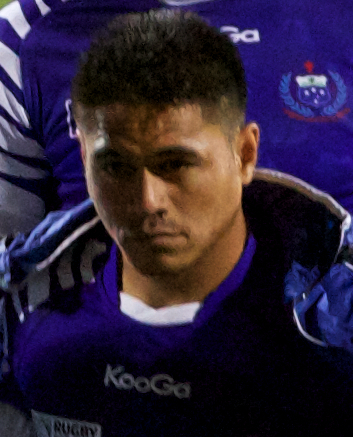
- Born: 10 February 1982 (age 44) Apia Samoa
- Height: 1.75 m (5 ft 9 in)
- Weight: 83 kg (13 st 1 lb; 183 lb)

Rugby union career
- Position: Wing
- Current team: Rouen Normandie
Senior career
Years	Team	Apps	(Points)
2005–2009	Bristol	84	(238)
2009–2011	London Wasps	44	(38)
2011–2012	Glasgow Warriors	10	(0)
2012–2014	Worcester Warriors	41	(85)
2014−2018	Bristol Bears	52	(115)
2018-	Rouen	1	(5)
- Correct as of 12 November 2018
International career
Years	Team	Apps	(Points)
2004–	Samoa	54	(65)
- Correct as of 12 November 2018
National sevens team
Years	Team		Comps
2003–2007	Samoa		
- Correct as of 12 November 2018

David Lemi (born 10 February 1982) is a former professional rugby player who played on the wing for Rouen.

Weighing 75 kg and only 1.75m tall, he is one of the smaller professional rugby players. However, his electric pace and low centre of gravity enabled him to be the 2nd highest Premiership try scorer for the 2005-06 season; and top scorer in the 2006-07 season.

As well as representing the Samoa national rugby sevens team, he has played for the senior 15-a-side team, representing his nation at the 2007 and 2011 World Cups.

== Europe ==
Lemi caught Bristol coach Richard Hill's eye in the 2005 Safari Sevens in Kenya and joined Bristol on a one-year deal.

During the 2005–06 season, Lemi scored 8 tries in 12 appearances. He signed a two-year contract extension in spring 2006.

Despite Bristol Rugby's relegation at the end of the 2008–09 season, Lemi still won The Sunday Times Try of the Season Award for the try he scored against Bath Rugby in the first game of the season. He was the joint second top try scorer in the 2008-09 Guinness Premiership season.

Following Bristol's relegation, it was confirmed in April that Lemi would be leaving the club. He was initially linked with Llanelli Scarlets. However, in May, Lemi signed a contract with Wasps. In 2012, Lemi signed a contract with Worcester Warriors and was reunited with former coach Richard Hill.

In 2014, Lemi was re-signed by Bristol, which would see him leave the Worcester Warriors at the end of the 2014 season and helped Bristol gain promotion the Aviva Premiership.

In April 2018, Lemi was announced as leaving Bristol Rugby at the end of the 2017/18 campaign, during which Bristol were promoted to the Aviva Premiership.
