= Malakai Ravulo =

Ratu Malakai Mana Ravulo
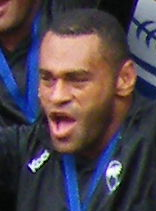
- Full name: Malakai Ravulo
- Born: 22 September 1983 (age 43) Korovou, Fiji
- Height: 1.90 m (6 ft 3 in)
- Weight: 107 kg (16 st 12 lb; 236 lb)

Rugby union career
- Position: Loose forward
- Current team: Farul Constanţa
Senior career
Years	Team	Apps	(Points)
2008–13	North Harbour	36	(10)
2014	Farul Constanţa	15	(5)
2015	Steaua București	7	(5)
- Correct as of 24 August 2015
International career
Years	Team	Apps	(Points)
2010–	Fiji	38	(10)
- Correct as of 24 June 2016

Malakai Ravulo (born 22 September 1983) is a Fijian rugby union player. He is a loose forward but spent most of his youth playing as a centre. He presently plays his rugby with the North Harbour rugby team in New Zealand.

Started his rugby at the prestigious rugby nursery Queen Victoria School in Fiji. Then was recruited to play work and play in Gisborne, NZ. He was then selected for Poverty Bay in the Heartland Championship where they won the title and was offered a contract to play professionally at North Harbor in the then ITM Cup. In October 2010 Malakai was selected for the Fiji 2010 November tour of Europe.
