= Toshiaki Hirose =

Japan international rugby union player

- Born: October 17, 1981 (age 45) Osaka, Japan
- Height: 173 cm (5 ft 8 in)
- Weight: 82 kg (12 st 13 lb; 181 lb)
- School: Kitano High School
- University: Keio University

Rugby union career
Senior career
Years	Team	Apps	(Points)
2004–2016	Toshiba Brave Lupus	166	(360)
International career
Years	Team	Apps	(Points)
2007–2015	Japan	28	(55)
National sevens team
Years	Team		Comps
	Japan		2

Toshiaki Hirose (廣瀬俊朗, Hirose Toshiaki; born October 17, 1981 in Osaka) is Japanese former rugby union player who played as a wing or fly half, and captained the national team between 2012 and 2013.

After becoming a regular starter for Toshiba Brave Lupus in the Top League, Hirose made his debut for Japan in 2007 against Hong Kong at fly-half scoring two tries, but never featured again under coach John Kirwan. He continued to be a key player at domestic level though, captaining Toshiba Brave Lupus to back to back Top League victories in 2009 and 2010.

In 2012, five years after his debut, he was recalled and named captain of the Japan national rugby union team by new coach, Eddie Jones. He had by now converted from fly-half to wing, and later that year led them to their first ever away wins in Europe against Romania and Georgia. He was also on the receiving end of a rant by Jones after a loss to the French Barbarians in June.

Hirose continued as captain in 2013, leading Japan to their first ever victory over Wales, but was dropped in 2014 with his place coming under increasing pressure from new caps Akihito Yamada and Kotaro Matsushima, and Jones citing a lack of pace. From there onwards he became a bit part player at international level with his remaining caps all coming off the bench as a utility player who could cover both fly-half and wing.

He was retained for the 2015 Rugby World Cup, with his leadership skills praised by Jones, but was the only player in the 31 man squad not to make the field in the tournament, and following a final season with Toshiba Brave Lupus decided to retire.
