= Steve Mafi =

Tonga international rugby union player

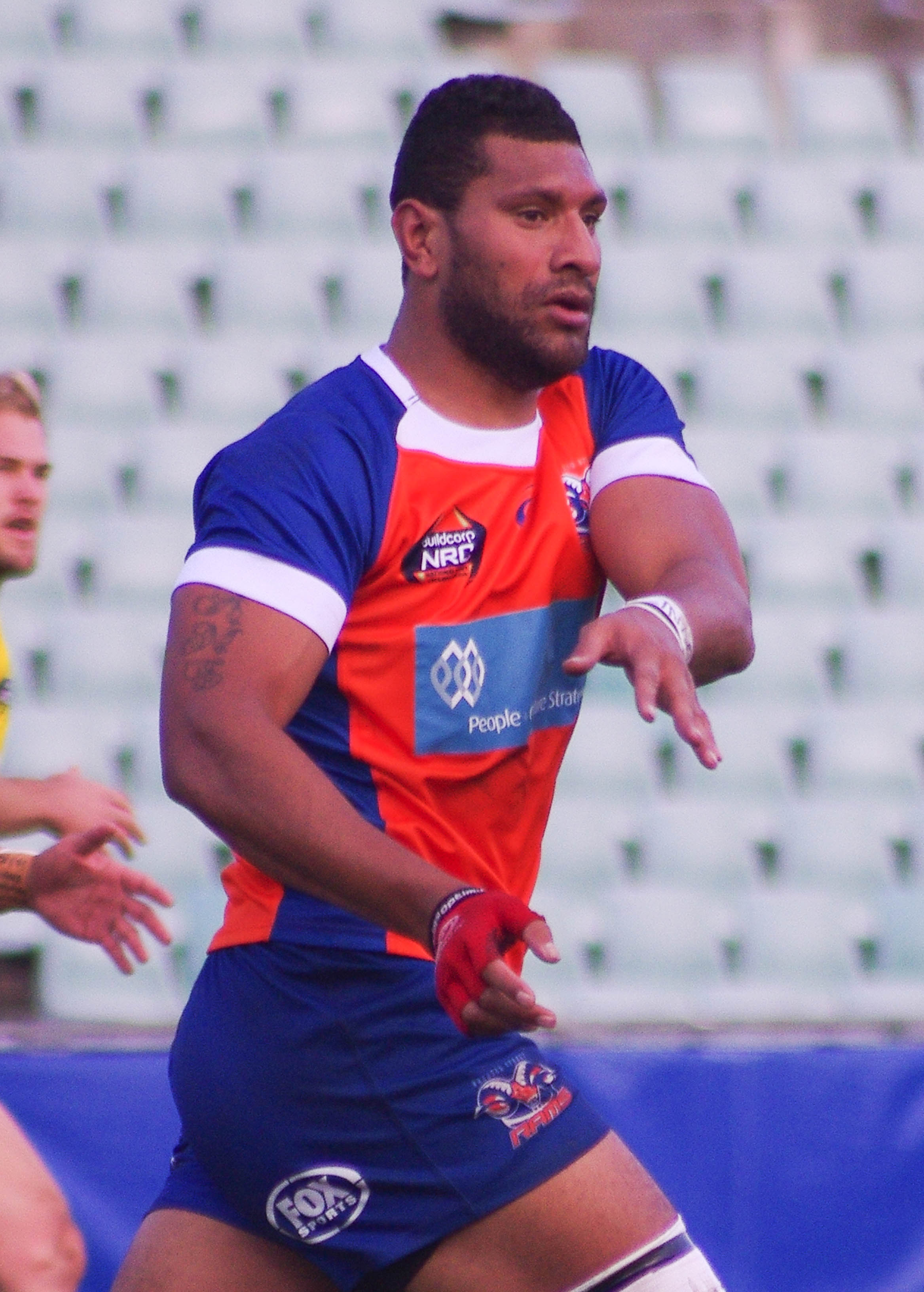
- Mafi representing Greater Sydney Rams during the National Rugby Championship
- Full name: Sitiveni Mafi
- Born: 9 December 1989 (age 36) Fairfield, New South Wales, Australia
- Height: 2.01 m (6 ft 7 in)
- Weight: 112 kg (247 lb; 17 st 9 lb)
- School: Westfields Sports High School

Rugby union career
- Position(s): Lock, Flanker, Number 8
- Current team: Oyonnax
Senior career
Years	Team	Apps	(Points)
2010–2014	Leicester Tigers	81	(55)
2014	Greater Sydney Rams	8	(0)
2015–2016	Force	26	(5)
2016–2019	Castres	56	(35)
2019–2022	London Irish	45	(40)
2022–	Oyonnax	16	(5)
- Correct as of 28 August 2023
International career
Years	Team	Apps	(Points)
2007	Australia U18	3	(0)
2010–	Tonga	41	(10)
- Correct as of 28 August 2023

Sitiveni Mafi (born 9 December 1989) is a professional rugby union player who plays as a lock for Top 14 club Oyonnax. Born in Australia, he represents Tonga at international level after qualifying on ancestry grounds.

== Club career ==
Mafi previously played for the Leicester Tigers and New South Wales Waratahs. Mafi played as a replacement during the 2013 Premiership final as Leicester defeated Northampton Saints. In the final of the 2017–18 Top 14 season he scored a try after coming on as a replacement as Castres defeated Montpellier.

He is the grandson of former Tonga captain Sione Mafi Pahulu. He attended Westfields Sports High School and played his Junior rugby at Parramatta Two Blues in Sydney's west. In 2007 he played for the Australian Schoolboys.

== Career statistics ==
=== Club summary ===
Year	Team	Played	Start	Sub	Tries	Cons	Pens	Drop	Points	Yel	Red
2015	Force	16	13	3	1	0	0	0	5	1	0
2016	Force	10	5	5	0	0	0	0	0	0	0
Career		26	18	8	1	0	0	0	5	1	0

as of 25 July 2016

== Honours ==
Leicester Tigers

- 1× Premiership Rugby: 2013

Castres

- 1× Top 14: 2018
