= Fa'atiga Lemalu =

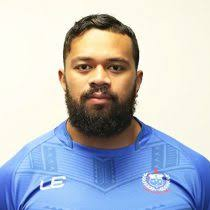
- Full name: Faatiga Lemalu
- Born: 17 April 1989 (age 37) Auckland, New Zealand
- Height: 1.97 m (6 ft 6 in)
- Weight: 115 kg (18 st 2 lb; 254 lb)
- School: De La Salle College, NZ
- Occupation: Rugby Union Player

Rugby union career
- Position: Lock
- Current team: Manawatu Turbos
Amateur team(s)
| Years | Team | Apps | (Points) |
| 2011–2012 | Papatoetoe RFC | 50 | (55) |
Senior career
| Years | Team | Apps | (Points) |
| 2013–2018 | Munakata Sanix Blues | 32 | (25) |
| 2016 | Sunwolves | 9 | (5) |
| 2018 | Auckland | 11 | (10) |
| 2018–2019 | Yorkshire Carnegie | 7 | (5) |
| 2019–2021 | Cornish Pirates | 19 | (5) |
| 2021 | Manawatu Turbos | 0 | (0) |
- Correct as of 1 August 2021
International career
| Years | Team | Apps | (Points) |
| 2007 | New Zealand Schools | 4 | (10) |
| 2012–present | Samoa | 25 | (15) |
- Correct as of 1 August 2021

Fa'atiga Lemalu (born 17 April 1989) is a New Zealand-born, Samoan international rugby union footballer who plays as a lock.

Lemalu played his professional rugby for the Munakata Sanix Blues in Fukuoka, Japan after joining them in 2013. He was also named in the new Japanese Sunwolves squad which made their first Super Rugby appearance for the 2016 season.

In 2017, Lemalu joined UK powerhouse club Saracens towards the later stage of the season as an injury cover during their 2016-17 Premiership Rugby campaign.

Lemalu would go on to play for Auckland Rugby, later becoming the champions of the 2018 Mitre 10 Cup in New Zealand since 2007.

Lemalu is a full international for Samoa having made his debut in a match against Tonga in 2012, missing the 2015 Rugby World Cup due to injury.

Yorkshire Carnegie strengthened their squad in November 2018 with the capture of Samoan international second row for the remainder of the 2018-2019 Greene King IPA Championship season.

At the beginning of the 2019 IPA Green King Championship, Cornish Pirates secured Lemalu on a two-year deal which saw him make 19 appearances before heading back to New Zealand signing with Manawatu Turbos for the upcoming Bunnings NPC 2021 season.

== Honours ==
- ASB College Sport Young Sportsperson of the Year (boys’ rugby union, Auckland region) – November 2007
