= 2014 end-of-year rugby union internationals =

The 2014 end-of-year rugby tests, also known as the 2014 autumn internationals in the Northern Hemisphere, were international rugby union matches predominantly played between visiting Southern Hemisphere countries and European nations.

Brazil, Canada, Germany, Georgia, Hong Kong, Japan, Namibia, Paraguay, Portugal, Romania, Russia, the United States and Uruguay A all played at least one test match during the three-week international window.

Within the window, the three Pacific Island teams faced Tier 1 opposition, when Wales and France hosted Fiji, and England and Italy hosted Samoa. At the time, Italy entered the Samoa test on the back of nine consecutive losses and a 15–0 loss to Samoa in Apia in June 2014. Scotland became the first Tier 1 nation to play a Test match on a fully artificial pitch when they hosted Tonga at Rugby Park, Kilmarnock, winning 37–12.

Georgia had a rare opportunity to play a Tier 1 nation in Ireland, who played The Lelos for the first time since their Pool D fixture in the 2007 Rugby World Cup. Ireland became the first Tier 1 nation to play Georgia since Argentina in June 2013, and the first Six Nations team to host a European Nations Cup team since Scotland's 48–6 win over Romania during the 2006 Autumn Internationals.

The United States played host to New Zealand for the first time since 1980, though that was not an official test match. Therefore, this was the first official test match between the two in America since 1913, when the All Blacks were 51–3 victors, and the last meeting between the two nations took place during the 1991 Rugby World Cup. The All Blacks won the game 74–6 in front of a sell-out crowd at Soldier Field.

History was made in Hong Kong, when a first-ever meeting between Hong Kong and Russia took place, and in Windhoek with a first-ever meeting between Germany and Namibia on Namibian soil.

Argentina visited Scotland, Italy and France, as they tried to build upon their first Rugby Championship win. Australia traveled to Wales, Ireland, England and France, who they had beaten 3–0 in their 2014 June Test series. New Zealand played Scotland, Wales and England, who had lost 3–0 to the All Blacks in their June Test series, while South Africa competed against Ireland, England, Wales and Italy.

Following a reduced 2014 IRB Pacific Nations Cup, the IRB organized matches between the Pacific island countries and North American teams at neutral venues in Europe; Tonga and Fiji played the United States, while Samoa played Canada. In addition to those, Romania hosted both Canada and the United States, while Romania and Georgia hosted Japan. Georgia also hosted Tonga for just their third meeting, the first since 1999.

Following the qualification of Namibia for the 2015 Rugby World Cup, an IRB–funded tour allowed Namibia to test themselves against higher ranked opposition; they played Canada in Colwyn Bay and Portugal in Lisbon. In preparation for a big year in Brazilian sport ahead of the introduction of Rugby sevens into the Olympic Games, Brazil hosted Uruguay and Paraguay to broaden their depth in the sport before their automatic participation in the 2016 competition.

Like in recent seasons, New Zealand and Australia played the third and final Bledisloe Cup Test match for the year, with New Zealand winning 29–28 with a last-minute try.

== Matches ==
=== 18 October ===
18 October 2014
20:00 AEST (UTC+10)

Australia	28–29	New Zealand
Try: Phipps 11' c Foley 38' m Ashley-Cooper 42'; Con: Foley (2/3) 13', 43'; Pen: Foley (2/2) 32', 58'; White (1/1) 76'	Report	Try: Jane 14' c Coles 34' m A. Smith 68' c Fekitoa 80'; Con: Barrett (2/3) 15', 69'; Slade (1/1) 80+1'; Pen: Barrett (1/1) 53'

Suncorp Stadium, Brisbane
Attendance: 45,186
Referee: Craig Joubert (South Africa)

Team details

FB	15	Israel Folau
RW	14	Adam Ashley-Cooper
OC	13	Tevita Kuridrani
IC	12	Christian Lealiifano
LW	11	Joe Tomane
FH	10	Bernard Foley
SH	9	Nick Phipps	(substituted off) 53'
N8	8	Scott Higginbotham	(substituted off) 60'
OF	7	Michael Hooper (c)
BF	6	Scott Fardy
RL	5	Rob Simmons
LL	4	Sam Carter	(substituted off) 63'
TP	3	Sekope Kepu	(substituted off) 63'
HK	2	Saia Fainga'a	(substituted off) 70'
LP	1	James Slipper	(substituted off) 66'
Replacements:
HK	16	Joshua Mann-Rea	(substituted on) 70'
PR	17	Benn Robinson	(substituted on) 66'
PR	18	Ben Alexander	(substituted on) 63'
LK	19	James Horwill	(substituted on) 63'
FL	20	Matt Hodgson	(substituted on) 60'
SH	21	Nic White	(substituted on) 53'
FH	22	Quade Cooper
WG	23	Rob Horne
Coach:
(Australia) Ewen McKenzie

FB	15	Israel Dagg
RW	14	Cory Jane		(substituted off) 40'
OC	13	Conrad Smith
IC	12	Malakai Fekitoa
LW	11	Julian Savea
FH	10	Beauden Barrett		(substituted off) 70'
SH	9	Aaron Smith		(substituted off) 70'
N8	8	Kieran Read
OF	7	Richie McCaw (c)
BF	6	Liam Messam		(substituted off) 61'
RL	5	Sam Whitelock		(substituted off) 56'
LL	4	Brodie Retallick
TP	3	Owen Franks		(substituted off) 47'
HK	2	Dane Coles		(substituted off) 44'
LP	1	Wyatt Crockett		(substituted off) 52'
Replacements:
HK	16	Keven Mealamu		(substituted on) 44'
PR	17	Ben Franks		(substituted on) 52'
PR	18	Charlie Faumuina		(substituted on) 47'
LK	19	Patrick Tuipulotu	(yellow card) 58' to 68'	(substituted on) 56'
FL	20	Sam Cane		(substituted on) 61'
SH	21	TJ Perenara		(substituted on) 70'
FH	22	Colin Slade		(substituted on) 70'
FB	23	Charles Piutau		(substituted on) 40'
Coach:
(New Zealand) Steve Hansen

Man of the Match:
Tevita Kuridrani (Australia)

Touch judges:
Jaco Peyper (South Africa)
Marius van der Westhuizen (South Africa)
Television match official:
Shaun Veldsman (South Africa)

Notes:

- Adam Ashley-Cooper became the sixth Australian player to earn 100 test caps, and the first to score a try in his 100th test.
- Adam Ashley-Cooper equaled David Campese's record of 8 tries scored against the All Blacks.
- Benn Robinson and Ben Alexander both equaled Al Baxter's 69 test caps and became the Wallabies' most-capped props.
- During the post-match press conference, Wallabies head coach Ewen McKenzie announced his resignation.

=== 29 October ===
29 October 2014
19:00 WAST (UTC+2)

Namibia	58–20	Germany
Try: Deysel 3' m Tromp (2) 11' c, 59' c Kitshoff (2) 22' c, 29' c R. De la Harpe 38' c Forbes 43' m Dames 47' m Greyling 76' m Con: Kaizemi (5/9) 12', 23', 30', 40', 61'; Pen: Kaizemi (1/2) 16'	Report	Try: Brenner 63' c Armstrong 68' c Con: Hilsenbeck (2/2) 64', 70'; Pen: Hilsenbeck (2/2) 7', 10'

Trustco United Rugby Club, Windhoek
Attendance: 3,000
Referee: Marius Jonker (South Africa)

Team details

FB	15	Danie Dames
RW	14	Malcolm Moore
OC	13	Darryl de la Harpe
IC	12	Johan Deysel
LW	11	Johann Tromp
FH	10	Shaun Kaizemi
SH	9	Ryan de la Harpe
N8	8	Tinus du Plessis
OF	7	Thomasau Forbes
BF	6	Rohan Kitshoff (c)
RL	5	Nico Esterhuyse
LL	4	Morné Blom
TP	3	André Schlechter
HK	2	Torsten van Jaarsveld
LP	1	Jaco Engels
Replacements:
HK	16	Rathony Becker
PR	17	Johnny Redelinghuys
PR	18	Casper Viviers
LK	19	Tjiuee Uanivi
SH	20	Eniell Buitendag
LK	21	Stefan Neustadt
FH	22	Theuns Kotzé
CE	23	JC Greyling
Coach:
(Namibia) Danie Vermeulen

FB	15	Steffen Liebig
RW	14	Mark Sztyndera
OC	13	Clemens von Grumbkow
IC	12	Anjo Buckman
LW	11	Marten Strauch
FH	10	Christopher Hilsenbeck
SH	9	Sean Armstrong (c)
N8	8	Rob May
OF	7	Robert Hittel
BF	6	Kehoma Brenner
RL	5	Benjamin Danso
LL	4	Robert Mohr
TP	3	Samy Füchsel
HK	2	Mika Tyumenev
LP	1	Arthur Zeiler
Replacements:
HK	16	Chris Kleebauer
PR	17	Marcus Bender
PR	18	Paul Weiss
LK	19	Benedikt Scherrer
FL	20	Ansgar Ruhnau
WG	21	Hendrik van der Merve
WG	22	Carlos Soteras-Merz
SH	23	Tim Menzel
Coach:
(South Africa) Kobus Potgieter

Touch judges:
Lourens van der Merwe (South Africa)
Rodney Boneparte (South Africa)

Notes:

- JC Greyling, Torsten van Jaarsveld and Tjiuee Uanivi made their international debuts for Namibia.
- Chris Kleebauer and Benedikt Scherrer made their international debuts for Germany.

=== 1 November ===
1 November 2014
14:00 JST (UTC+9)

Japan	21–61	Māori All Blacks
Try: Penalty try (2) 25' c, 73' c Mafi 52' c Con: Goromaru (3/3) 27', 53', 73'	Report	Try: Eves 7' m Emery (2) 20' c, 34' c Polwart 23' c West 46' c Milner-Skudder 55' m Ngatai 63' c Lowe 76' c Con: West (6/8) 21', 24', 35', 47', 64', 77'; Pen: West (3/5) 14', 17', 40'

Noevir Stadium, Kobe
Attendance: 21,234
Referee: Luke Pearce (England)

Team details

FB	15	Ayumu Goromaru
RW	14	Kotaro Matsushima
OC	13	Harumichi Tatekawa	(substituted off) 60'
IC	12	Male Sa'u
LW	11	Akihito Yamada	(substituted off) 53'
FH	10	Yuu Tamura	(substituted off) 40'
SH	9	Atsushi Hiwasa
N8	8	Hayden Hopgood	(substituted off) 49'
OF	7	Michael Leitch (c)
BF	6	Hendrik Tui
RL	5	Shoji Ito	(substituted off) 53'
LL	4	Luke Thompson
TP	3	Kensuke Hatakeyama	(substituted off) 64'
HK	2	Takeshi Kizu	(substituted off) 70'
LP	1	Masataka Mikami	(substituted off) 17'
Replacements:
PR	16	Keita Inagaki	(substituted on) 17'
HK	17	Hiroki Yuhara	(substituted on) 70'
PR	18	Shinnosuke Kakinaga	(substituted on) 64'
LK	19	Shinya Makabe	(substituted on) 53'
N8	20	Amanaki Mafi	(substituted on) 49'
SH	21	Keisuke Uchida	(substituted on) 60'
FH	22	Kosei Ono	(substituted on) 40'
WG	23	Karne Hesketh	(substituted on) 53'
Coach:
(Australia) Eddie Jones

FB	15	Robbie Robinson	(substituted off) 56'
RW	14	Matt Proctor
OC	13	Jason Emery	(substituted off) 54'
IC	12	Charlie Ngatai (c)
LW	11	James Lowe
FH	10	Ihaia West
SH	9	Chris Smylie	(substituted off) 56'
N8	8	Elliot Dixon	(substituted off) 49'
OF	7	Sean Polwart
BF	6	Blade Thomson
RL	5	Hayden Triggs	(substituted off) 53'
LL	4	Tom Franklin
TP	3	Mike Kainga	(substituted off) 59'
HK	2	Ash Dixon	(substituted off) 22'
LP	1	Chris Eves	(substituted off) 65'
Replacements:
HK	16	Codie Taylor	(substituted on) 22'
PR	17	Joe Royal	(substituted on) 65'
PR	18	Nick Barrett	(substituted on) 59'
FL	19	Nick Crosswell	(substituted on) 53'
FL	20	Dan Pryor	(substituted on) 49'
SH	21	Jamison Gibson-Park	(substituted on) 56'
FH	22	Marty McKenzie	(substituted on) 56'
WG	23	Nehe Milner-Skudder	(substituted on) 54'
Coach:
(New Zealand) Colin Cooper

Touch judges:
Angus Gardner (Australia)
James Leckie (Australia)
Television match official:
George Ayoub (Australia)

1 November 2014
14:30 GMT (UTC+0)

Barbarians	36–40	Australia
Try: Halai 14' m Thomson 26' c Saili 47' c Cummins 73'; Boshoff 77' c Con: Slade (2/3) 27', 48'; Boshoff (2/2) 74', 78'; Pen: Slade (1/1) 51'	Report	Try: Carter 24' c Robinson 30' c Kuridrani 46' c Horne 57' m Foley 63' c McMahon 66' c Con: Cooper (3/3) 25', 31', 47'; Foley (2/3) 64', 68'

Twickenham, London
Referee: Jaco Peyper (South Africa)

Team details

FB	15	(New Zealand) Tim Nanai-Williams
RW	14	(New Zealand) Frank Halai
OC	13	(South Africa) Juan de Jongh	(substituted off) 53'
IC	12	(New Zealand) Francis Saili
LW	11	(Australia) Nick Cummins
FH	10	(New Zealand) Colin Slade	(substituted off) 68'
SH	9	(Argentina) Tomás Cubelli	(substituted off) 59'
N8	8	(New Zealand) Steve Luatua
OF	7	(New Zealand) Matt Todd
BF	6	(New Zealand) Adam Thomson	(substituted off) 51'
RL	5	(Scotland) Alastair Kellock (c)	(substituted off) 49'
LL	4	(New Zealand) Dominic Bird
TP	3	(New Zealand) Angus Ta'avao	(substituted off) 49'
HK	2	(New Zealand) James Parsons	(substituted off) 49'
LP	1	(England) Matt Stevens	(substituted off) 49'
Replacements:
HK	16	(Samoa) Mahonri Schwalger	(substituted on) 49'
PR	17	(South Africa) Thomas du Toit	(substituted on) 49'
PR	18	(South Africa) Lourens Adriaanse	(substituted on) 49'
FL	19	(South Africa) Heinrich Brüssow	(substituted on) 51'
LK	20	(Argentina) Matías Alemanno	(substituted on) 49'
SH	21	(South Africa) Sarel Pretorius	(substituted on) 59'
FB	22	(Argentina) Joaquín Tuculet	(substituted on) 53'
FH	23	(South Africa) Marnitz Boshoff	(substituted on) 68'
Coach:
(New Zealand) John Kirwan

FB	15	Israel Folau
RW	14	Henry Speight
OC	13	Tevita Kuridrani
IC	12	Matt To'omua	(substituted off) 64'
LW	11	Rob Horne
FH	10	Quade Cooper	(substituted off) 53'
SH	9	Will Genia	(substituted off) 53'
N8	8	Ben McCalman
OF	7	Matt Hodgson (c)	20' to 26'
BF	6	Scott Higginbotham	(substituted off) 18'
RL	5	James Horwill
LL	4	Sam Carter			(substituted off) 57'
TP	3	Ben Alexander	(substituted off) 58'
HK	2	Saia Fainga'a	(substituted off) 53'
LP	1	Benn Robinson	(substituted off) 53'
Replacements:
HK	16	James Hanson	(substituted on) 53'
PR	17	James Slipper	(substituted on) 53'
PR	18	Sekope Kepu	(substituted on) 58'
LK	19	Will Skelton	(substituted on) 20'	(substituted off) 26'	(substituted on) 57'
FL	20	Sean McMahon	(substituted on) 18'
SH	21	Nic White	(substituted on) 53'
FH	22	Bernard Foley	(substituted on) 53'
CE	23	Christian Lealiifano	(substituted on) 64'
Coach:
(Australia) Michael Cheika

Man of the Match:
Tevita Kuridrani (Australia) Touch judges:
JP Doyle (England)
Greg Garner (England)
Television match official:
Rowan Kitt (England)

Notes:

- Australia won the Killik Cup, after the Barbarians won it in 2013 against Fiji and England failed to reclaim it in June 2014.

1 November 2014
15:00 CDT (UTC-05)

United States	6–74	New Zealand
Pen: Siddall (2/2) 10', 17'	Report	Try: Harris 2' m Jane 14' c Tuipulotu 19' c Williams (2) 20' c, 29' c Piutau 25' m Savea (2) 33' m, 78' c Moody 45' m Cruden 48' m Dagg 56' c Cane 64' c Con: Cruden (4/9) 15', 19', 21', 29'; Carter (3/3) 57', 65', 80'

Soldier Field, Chicago
Attendance: 61,500
Referee: Craig Joubert (South Africa)

Team details

FB	15	Chris Wyles
RW	14	Blaine Scully
OC	13	Seamus Kelly
IC	12	Andrew Suniula	(substituted off) 78'
LW	11	Brett Thompson	(substituted off) 36'
FH	10	Adam Siddall
SH	9	Mike Petri	(substituted off) 60'
N8	8	Danny Barrett	(substituted off) 6'
OF	7	Scott LaValla
BF	6	Todd Clever (c)
RL	5	Hayden Smith
LL	4	Samu Manoa
TP	3	Olive Kilifi	(substituted off) 55'	(substituted on) 72'
HK	2	Phil Thiel	(substituted off) 55'
LP	1	Eric Fry	(substituted off) 55'
Replacements:
HK	16	Tom Coolican	(substituted on) 55'
PR	17	Nicholas Wallace	(substituted on) 55'
PR	18	Mate Moeakiola	(substituted on) 55'	(substituted off) 72'
LK	19	Tai Tuisamoa	(substituted on) 6'	(substituted off) 67'
FL	20	Louis Stanfill		(substituted on) 67'
SH	21	Shalom Suniula	(substituted on) 60'
CE	22	Folau Niua	(substituted on) 36'
WG	23	Tim Stanfill	(substituted on) 78'
Coach:
(United States) Mike Tolkin

FB	15	Israel Dagg
RW	14	Cory Jane	(substituted off) 32'
OC	13	Ryan Crotty
IC	12	Sonny Bill Williams	(substituted off) 59'
LW	11	Charles Piutau
FH	10	Aaron Cruden	(substituted off) 50'
SH	9	TJ Perenara
N8	8	Kieran Read (c)	(substituted off) 54'
OF	7	Sam Cane
BF	6	Victor Vito	(substituted off) 71'
RL	5	Patrick Tuipulotu
LL	4	Jeremy Thrush
TP	3	Charlie Faumuina	(substituted off) 71'
HK	2	Nathan Harris	(substituted off) 12'
LP	1	Joe Moody	(substituted off) 51'
Replacements:
HK	16	Keven Mealamu	(substituted on) 12'
PR	17	Ben Franks	(substituted on) 51'
PR	18	Owen Franks	(substituted on) 71'
LK	19	Brodie Retallick	(substituted on) 71'
FL	20	Liam Messam	(substituted on) 54'
SH	21	Augustine Pulu	(substituted on) 59'
FH	22	Dan Carter	(substituted on) 50'
WG	23	Julian Savea	(substituted on) 32'
Coach:
(New Zealand) Steve Hansen

Man of the Match:
Sonny Bill Williams (New Zealand)

Touch judges:
Chris Assmus (Canada)
Andrew McMaster (Canada)
Television match official:
Brian Arciero (Canada)

Notes:

- The attendance for this match more than tripled the previous record crowd for an international rugby match in the U.S. of 20,181, set in June 2013 when the USA hosted Ireland at BBVA Compass Stadium in Houston. Soldier Field, with a 61,500 capacity, was sold out a week before the match.
- The score was a record for the All Blacks against the US, surpassing their 51–3 victory in 1913.
- Augustine Pulu made his international debut for New Zealand.
- Tim Stanfill made his international debut for the United States.

2 November 2014
15:15 GMT (UTC+0)

RFU Championship XV (England)	28–23	Canada
Try: Bright 6' c Tovey 42' c Mama 47' c Phillips 70' c Con: Rayner (3/3) 7', 43', 48'; Hallett (1/1) 71'	Report	Try: Gilmour 3' m McRorie (2) 27' c, 53' m Con: Pritchard (1/3) 28'; Pen: Pritchard (2/2) 9', 13'

Sixways Stadium, Worcester
Referee: Matthew Carley (England)

Team details

FB	15	(Ireland) Jack Tovey
RW	14	(Ireland) Michael Keating
OC	13	(England) Greg King
IC	12	(Wales) Will Owen
LW	11	(England) Miles Mantella	(substituted off) 55'
FH	10	(England) Lawrence Rayner	(substituted off) 61'
SH	9	(England) Tom Kessell	(substituted off) 55'
N8	8	(England) Mark Bright	(substituted off) 55'
OF	7	(South Africa) Nick Fenton-Wells
BF	6	(Zimbabwe) Marco Mama
RL	5	(England) Darren Barry	(substituted off) 61'
LL	4	(England) James Percival (c)
TP	3	(England) Michael Holford	(substituted off) 31'
HK	2	(England) Tom Cruse	(substituted off) 55'
LP	1	(England) Ryan Bower	(substituted off) 61'
Replacements:
HK	16	(England) Charlie Clare	(substituted on) 55'
PR	17	(England) Lee Imiolek	(substituted on) 61'
PR	18	(England) Max Maidment	(substituted on) 31'
LK	19	(England) James Phillips	(substituted on) 61'
N8	20	(England) Ryan Burrows	(substituted on) 55'
SH	21	(England) Jonny Arr	(substituted on) 55'
FH	22	(Ireland) Kieran Hallett	(substituted on) 61'
WG	23	(Scotland) Dougie Flockhart	(substituted on) 55'
Coach:
(England) Martin Haag

FB	15	James Pritchard
RW	14	Sean Duke
OC	13	Ciaran Hearn
IC	12	Nick Blevins		(substituted off) 65'
LW	11	Conor Trainor
FH	10	Pat Parfrey		(substituted off) 71'
SH	9	Gordon McRorie
N8	8	John Moonlight
OF	7	Nanyak Dala
BF	6	Kyle Gilmour
RL	5	Brett Beukeboom
LL	4	Tyler Hotson		(substituted off) 55'
TP	3	Andrew Tiedemann		(substituted off) 55'
HK	2	Ray Barkwill	(yellow card) 46' to 56'	(substituted off) 71'
LP	1	Hubert Buydens (c)
Replacements:
HK	16	Ryan Hamilton		(substituted on) 71'
PR	17	Doug Wooldridge
PR	18	Jake Illnicki		(substituted on) 55'
FB	19	Jordan Wilson-Ross		(substituted on) 71'
FL	20	Seb Pearson
SH	21	Sean White
FH	22	Connor Braid		(substituted on) 65'
LK	23	Jon Phelan		(substituted on) 55'
Coach:
(New Zealand) Kieran Crowley

Man of the Match:
(Zimbabwe) Marco Mama (RFU Championship XV)

Touch judges:
Philip Watters (England)
Jonathan Healy (England)
Television match official:
Geoff Warren (England)

=== 7/8 November ===
7 November 2014
19:00 GMT (UTC+0)

Canada	17–13	Namibia
Try: Dala 57' m Pen: McRorie (4/4) 7', 12', 31', 45'	Report	Try: Burger 74' c Con: Kotzé (1/1) 75'; Pen: Kotzé (2/3) 25', 32'

Eirias Stadium, Colwyn Bay, Wales
Referee: Stuart Berry (South Africa)

Team details

FB	15	D. T. H. van der Merwe
RW	14	Jordan Wilson-Ross
OC	13	Conor Trainor
IC	12	Ciaran Hearn
LW	11	Sean Duke
FH	10	Connor Braid
SH	9	Gordon McRorie	(substituted off) 62'
N8	8	John Moonlight
OF	7	Nanyak Dala
BF	6	Kyle Gilmour
RL	5	Jebb Sinclair
LL	4	Tyler Hotson	(substituted off) 59'
TP	3	Jason Marshall
HK	2	Ray Barkwill	(substituted off) 66'
LP	1	Hubert Buydens (c)
Replacements:
HK	16	Aaron Carpenter	(substituted on) 66'
PR	17	Jake Illnicki
PR	18	Doug Wooldridge
LK	19	Brett Beukeboom	(substituted on) 59'
CE	20	Nick Blevins
SH	21	Sean White	(substituted on) 62'
FH	22	Pat Parfrey
FB	23	James Pritchard
Coach:
(New Zealand) Kieran Crowley

FB	15	Chrysander Botha		(substituted off) 10'
RW	14	Danie Dames
OC	13	Darryl de la Harpe
IC	12	Johan Deysel
LW	11	David Philander
FH	10	Theuns Kotzé
SH	9	Eniell Buitendag		(substituted off) 40'
N8	8	PJ van Lill		7' to 10'
OF	7	Jacques Burger (c)
BF	6	Rohan Kitshoff	(yellow card) 36' to 46'
RL	5	Tjiuee Uanivi		(substituted off) 78'
LL	4	Morné Blom
TP	3	André Schlechter		(substituted off) 75'
HK	2	Torsten van Jaarsveld
LP	1	Johnny Redelinghuys		(substituted off) 75'
Replacements:
HK	16	Rathony Becker
PR	17	Franklin Bertolini		(substituted on) 75'
PR	18	Casper Viviers		(substituted on) 75'
LK	19	Stefan Neustadt		(substituted on) 78'
FL	20	Thomasau Forbes		(substituted on) 7'	(substituted off) 10'
SH	21	Ryan de la Harpe		(substituted on) 40'
FH	22	Shaun Kaizemi
WG	23	Johann Tromp		(substituted on) 10'
Coach:
(Namibia) Danie Vermeulen

Touch judges:
Neil Paterson (Scotland)
Martyn Lewis (Wales)

Notes:

- Jordan Wilson-Ross made his international debut for Canada.
- Franklin Bertolini made his international debut for Namibia.

8 November 2014
14:00 JST (UTC+9)

Japan	18–20	Māori All Blacks
Try: Yamada 38' m Penalty try 47' c Con: Goromaru (1/2) 48'; Pen: Goromaru (2/3) 54', 72'	Report	Try: Taylor 16' c Milner-Skudder 22' m Pryor 80' m Con: West (1/2) 17'; Pen: West (1/2) 31'

Chichibunomiya Rugby Stadium, Tokyo
Attendance: 20,515
Referee: Angus Gardner (Australia)

Team details

FB	15	Ayumu Goromaru
RW	14	Karne Hesketh
OC	13	Kotaro Matsushima
IC	12	Male Sa'u	(substituted off) 73'
LW	11	Akihito Yamada	(substituted off) 48'
FH	10	Kosei Ono
SH	9	Atsushi Hiwasa
N8	8	Amanaki Mafi
OF	7	Michael Leitch (c)	(substituted off) 75'
BF	6	Hendrik Tui
RL	5	Shinya Makabe	(substituted off) 65'
LL	4	Luke Thompson
TP	3	Kensuke Hatakeyama
HK	2	Takeshi Kizu	(substituted off) 58'
LP	1	Keita Inagaki
Replacements:
PR	16	Yusuke Nagae
HK	17	Hiroki Yuhara	(substituted on) 58'
PR	18	Shinnosuke Kakinaga
LK	19	Hitoshi Ono	(substituted on) 65'
N8	20	Hayden Hopgood	(substituted on) 75'
SH	21	Keisuke Uchida
FH	22	Harumichi Tatekawa	(substituted on) 68'
CE	23	Ryohei Yamanaka	(substituted on) 73'
Coach:
(Australia) Eddie Jones

FB	15	Nehe Milner-Skudder		(substituted off) 65'
RW	14	Kurt Baker
OC	13	Matt Proctor
IC	12	Charlie Ngatai (c)
LW	11	James Lowe
FH	10	Ihaia West		(substituted off) 58'
SH	9	Chris Smylie		(substituted off) 72'
N8	8	Elliot Dixon
OF	7	Sean Polwart		(substituted off) 46'
BF	6	Dan Pryor
RL	5	Blade Thomson
LL	4	Tom Franklin	(yellow card) 6' to 16'	(substituted off) 58'
TP	3	Mike Kainga
HK	2	Codie Taylor		(substituted off) 72'
LP	1	Chris Eves		(substituted off) 58'
Replacements:
HK	16	Joe Royal		(substituted on) 72'
PR	17	Brendon Edmonds		(substituted on) 58'
PR	18	Nick Barrett
LK	19	Hayden Triggs		(substituted on) 58'
N8	20	Mitchell Crosswell		(substituted on) 46'
SH	21	Jamison Gibson-Park		(substituted on) 72'
FH	22	Marty McKenzie		(substituted on) 58'
WG	23	Joe Webber		(substituted on) 65'
Coach:
(New Zealand) Colin Cooper

Touch judges:
Luke Pearce (England)
James Leckie (Australia)
Television match official:
George Ayoub (Australia)

8 November 2014
18:00 HKT (UTC+8)

Hong Kong	10–31	Russia
Try: Varty 74' c Con: Hood (1/1) 75'; Pen: Hood (1/1) 9'	Report	Try: Otrokov 13' c Galinovskiy 39' c Sidrov 78' m Con: Kushnarev (2/3) 14', 40'; Pen: Kushnarev (4/4) 3', 21', 30', 48'

Kings Park Sports Ground, Hong Kong
Referee: Akihisa Aso (Japan)

Team details

FB	15	James Richards	(substituted off) 48'
RW	14	Tom McQueen
OC	13	Max Woodward
IC	12	Lloyd Jones
LW	11	Salom Yiu Kam-Shing	(substituted off) 48'
FH	10	Jamie Hood
SH	9	Duncan Pollock	(substituted off) 68'
N8	8	Nick Hewson (c)	(substituted off) 47'
OF	7	Matt Lamming	(substituted off) 71'
BF	6	Josh Li
RL	5	Jack Delaforce
LL	4	Paul Dywer
TP	3	Alex Ng Wai-Shing	(substituted off) 40'
HK	2	Alex Harris	(substituted off) 66'
LP	1	John Aikmen	(substituted off) 48'
Replacements:
PR	16	Jack Parfitt	(substituted on) 40'
PR	17	Leon Wei Hon-Sum	(substituted on) 48'
HK	18	Lachlan Chubb	(substituted on) 66'
FL	19	Bill Brant	(substituted on) 47'
N8	20	Andrew Bridle	(substituted on) 71'
SH	21	Charles Cheung Ho-Ning	(substituted on) 68'
FH	22	Reece Hamon	(substituted on) 48'
WG	23	Rowan Varty	(substituted on) 48'
Coach:
(Scotland) Andrew Hall

FB	15	Vasily Artemyev (c)		(substituted off) 62'
RW	14	Andrei Otrokov	(yellow card) 68' to 78'
OC	13	Mikhail Babaev		(substituted off) 76'
IC	12	Vladimir Rudenko
LW	11	Igor Galinovskiy
FH	10	Yuri Kushnarev
SH	9	Alexey Shcherban		(substituted off) 76'
N8	8	Viktor Gresev
OF	7	Pavel Butenko
BF	6	Vitaly Zhivatov		(substituted off) 62'
RL	5	Andrei Garbuzov
LL	4	Ilya Osminko		(substituted off) 67'
TP	3	Evgeni Pronenko		(substituted off) 53'
HK	2	Stanislav Selskiy		(substituted off) 71'
LP	1	Grigory Tsnobiladze		(substituted off) 70'
Replacements:
HK	16	Sergey Chernyshev		(substituted on) 71'
PR	17	Sergey Sekisov		(substituted on) 70'
PR	18	Andrei Igretsov		(substituted on) 53'
LK	19	Nikolay Serkov		(substituted on) 67'
FL	20	Mikhai Sidorov		(substituted on) 62'
SH	21	Vasily Dorofeyev		(substituted on) 76'
FH	22	Ramil Gaisin		(substituted on) 76'
FB	23	Ilya Dyomushkin		(substituted on) 62'
Coach:
(Russia) Raphaël Saint-André

Touch judges:
Shuhei Kubo (Japan)
Takashi Harada (Japan)

Notes:

- John Aikmen, Reece Hamon, Jack Parfitt, Duncan Pollock and James Richards made their international debut for Hong Kong.
- Sergey Chernysev, Vasily Dorofeyev, Ilya Dyomushkin, Nikolay Serkov and Vitaly Zhivatov made their international debuts for Russia.
- Vasily Artemyev earned his 50th test cap for Russia.

8 November 2014
17:00 GET (UTC+4)

Georgia	9–23	Tonga
Pen: Kvirikashvili (3/4) 11', 40', 51'	Report	Try: Moa (2) 64' c, 70' m Lilo 77' m Con: Fosita (1/3) 65'; Pen: Morath (2/2) 27', 45'

Mikheil Meskhi Stadium, Tbilisi
Referee: Pascal Gaüzère (France)

Team details

FB	15	Merab Kvirikashvili
RW	14	Irakli Machkhaneli (c)
OC	13	Davit Kacharava
IC	12	Merab Sharikadze
LW	11	Tamaz Mchedlidze
FH	10	Lasha Khmaladze		(substituted off) 73'
SH	9	Giorgi Begadze		(substituted off) 73'
N8	8	Giorgi Chkhaidze				(substituted off) 66'
OF	7	Viktor Kolelishvili		32' to 40'
BF	6	Giga Tkhilaishvili	(yellow card) 76' to 80'
RL	5	Levan Datunashvili
LL	4	Konstantin Mikautadze
TP	3	Davit Kubriashvili		(substituted off) 66'
HK	2	Shalva Mamukashvili		(substituted off) 69'
LP	1	Mikheil Nariashvili		(substituted off) 66'
Replacements:
HK	16	Simon Maisuradze		(substituted on) 69'
PR	17	Zurabi Zhvania		(substituted on) 66'
PR	18	Levan Chilachava		(substituted on) 66'
LK	19	Giorgi Nemsadze
LK	20	Lasha Lomidze		(substituted on) 32'	(substituted off) 40'	(substituted on) 66'
SH	21	Vazha Khutsishvili		(substituted on) 73'
FH	22	Lasha Malaghuradze		(substituted on) 73'
CE	23	Sandro Todua
Coach:
(New Zealand) Milton Haig

FB	15	Vunga Lilo
RW	14	David Halaifonua
OC	13	Siale Piutau
IC	12	Mataʻali Paea	(substituted off) 61'
LW	11	Fetuʻu Vainikolo
FH	10	Kurt Morath	(substituted off) 61'
SH	9	Sonatane Takulua	(substituted off) 60'
N8	8	Viliami Maʻafu
OF	7	Nili Latu (c)	(substituted off) 76'
BF	6	Sione Kalamafoni
RL	5	Joe Tuineau	(substituted off) 76'
LL	4	Tukulua Lokotui
TP	3	Sila Puafisi	(substituted off) 54'
HK	2	Aleki Lutui	(substituted off) 69'
LP	1	Tevita Mailau	(substituted off) 54'
Replacements:
HK	16	Elvis Taione	(substituted on) 69'
PR	17	Siua Halanukonuka	(substituted on) 54'
PR	18	Paea Faʻanunu	(substituted on) 54'
LK	19	Lisiate Faʻaoso	(substituted on) 76'
LK	20	Hale T-Pole	(substituted on) 76'
SH	21	Taniela Moa	(substituted on) 60'
FH	22	Latiume Fosita	(substituted on) 61'
WG	23	Otulea Katoa	(substituted on) 61'
Coach:
(Tonga) Mana Otai

Touch judges:
Andrew McMenemy (Scotland)
Vlad Iordachescu (Romania)
Television match official:
Carlo Damasco (Italy)

Notes:

- Paea Faʻanunu and Siua Halanukonuka made their international debuts for Tonga.

8 November 2014
15:00 CET (UTC+1)

Italy	13–24	Samoa
Try: Favaro 47' m Parisse 65' c Con: Haimona (1/2) 66'; Pen: Haimona (4/6) 10', 43', 54', 73'	Report	Try: Lam 32' c Con: T. Pisi (1/1) 33'; Pen: T. Pisi (2/3) 26', 51'

Stadio Cino e Lillo Del Duca, Ascoli Piceno
Attendance: 11,100
Referee: Steve Walsh (Australia)

Team details

FB	15	Andrea Masi
RW	14	Luke McLean
OC	13	Michele Campagnaro
IC	12	Luca Morisi				(substituted off) 73'
LW	11	Leonardo Sarto		19' to 24'
FH	10	Kelly Haimona
SH	9	Edoardo Gori
N8	8	Sergio Parisse (c)
OF	7	Simone Favaro		(substituted off) 68'
BF	6	Alessandro Zanni
RL	5	Joshua Furno		(substituted off) 64'
LL	4	Quintin Geldenhuys
TP	3	Dario Chistolini		(substituted off) 69'
HK	2	Leonardo Ghiraldini		(substituted off) 64'
LP	1	Matías Agüero		(substituted off) 69'
Replacements:
HK	16	Andrea Manici		(substituted on) 64'
PR	17	Alberto De Marchi	(yellow card) 80+2' to 80+3'	(substituted on) 69'
PR	18	Lorenzo Cittadini		(substituted on) 69'
LK	19	Marco Bortolami		(substituted on) 64'
FL	20	Robert Barbieri		(substituted on) 68'
SH	21	Guglielmo Palazzani
FH	22	Luciano Orquera
WG	23	Giulio Toniolatti		(substituted on) 19'	(substituted off) 24'	(substituted on) 73'
Coach:
(France) Jacques Brunel

FB	15	Fa'atoina Autagavaia	(substituted off) 80'
RW	14	Ken Pisi
OC	13	Johnny Leota	(substituted off) 73'
IC	12	Alapati Leiua
LW	11	David Lemi (c)
FH	10	Tusi Pisi	(substituted off) 73'
SH	9	Kahn Fotuali'i
N8	8	Taiasina Tuifu'a
OF	7	Jack Lam	(substituted off) 67'
BF	6	Piula Fa'asalele
RL	5	Fa'atiga Lemalu
LL	4	Kane Thompson	(substituted off) 40'
TP	3	Anthony Perenise	(substituted off) 74'
HK	2	Ti’i Paulo	(substituted off) 52'
LP	1	Sakaria Taulafo	(substituted off) 52'
Replacements:
HK	16	Ole Avei	(substituted on) 52'
PR	17	Patrick-Albert Toetu	(substituted on) 74'
PR	18	Viliamu Afatia	(substituted on) 52'
LK	19	Filo Paulo	(substituted on) 40'
FL	20	Maurie Fa'asavalu	(substituted on) 67'
SH	21	Pete Cowley	(substituted on) 80'
FH	22	Michael Stanley	(substituted on) 73'
CE	23	Winston Stanley	(substituted on) 73'
Coach:
(Samoa) Stephen Betham

Man of the Match:
Simone Favaro (Italy)

Touch judges:
John Lacey (Ireland)
Greg Garner (England)
Television match official:
Gareth Simmonds (Wales)

Notes:

- Italy ends a 9 consecutive losing streak with their first win since their 37–31 against Fiji in November 2013.
- Kelly Haimona made his international debut for Italy.
- Michael and Winston Stanley, Pete Cowley and Patrick-Albert Toetu made their international debuts for Samoa.
- Quintin Geldenhuys earned his 50th test cap for Italy.

8 November 2014
14:30 GMT (UTC+0)

England	21–24	New Zealand
Try: May 3' m Penalty try 79' c Con: Ford (1/1) 79'; Pen: Farrell (3/3) 17', 21', 40'	Report	Try: Cruden 13' m McCaw 45' m Faumuina 71' m Pen: Cruden (2/3) 23', 36'; Barrett (1/2) 65'

Twickenham, London
Attendance: 82,223
Referee: Nigel Owens (Wales)

Team details

FB	15	Mike Brown
RW	14	Semesa Rokoduguni	(substituted off) 61'
OC	13	Brad Barritt
IC	12	Kyle Eastmond	(substituted off) 64'
LW	11	Jonny May
FH	10	Owen Farrell
SH	9	Danny Care	(substituted off) 61'
N8	8	Billy Vunipola	(substituted off) 52'
OF	7	Chris Robshaw (c)
BF	6	Tom Wood
RL	5	Courtney Lawes	(substituted off) 22'
LL	4	Dave Attwood
TP	3	David Wilson	(substituted off) 73'
HK	2	Dylan Hartley	(substituted off) 73'
LP	1	Joe Marler	(substituted off) 54'
Replacements:
HK	16	Rob Webber	(substituted on) 73'
PR	17	Matt Mullan	(substituted on) 54'
PR	18	Kieran Brookes	(substituted on) 73'
LK	19	George Kruis	(substituted on) 22'
N8	20	Ben Morgan	(substituted on) 52'
SH	21	Ben Youngs	(substituted on) 61'
FH	22	George Ford	(substituted on) 64'
WG	23	Anthony Watson	(substituted on) 61'
Coach:
(England) Stuart Lancaster

FB	15	Israel Dagg
RW	14	Ben Smith
OC	13	Conrad Smith		(substituted off) 47'
IC	12	Sonny Bill Williams
LW	11	Julian Savea
FH	10	Aaron Cruden		(substituted off) 59'
SH	9	Aaron Smith		(substituted off) 66'
N8	8	Kieran Read
OF	7	Richie McCaw (c)
BF	6	Jerome Kaino		(substituted off) 60'
RL	5	Sam Whitelock
LL	4	Brodie Retallick		(substituted off) 40'
TP	3	Owen Franks		(substituted off) 47'
HK	2	Dane Coles	(yellow card) 56' to 66'	(substituted off) 66'
LP	1	Wyatt Crockett		(substituted off) 59'
Replacements:
HK	16	Keven Mealamu		(substituted on) 60'
PR	17	Ben Franks		(substituted on) 59'
PR	18	Charlie Faumuina		(substituted on) 47'
LK	19	Patrick Tuipulotu		(substituted on) 40'
FL	20	Liam Messam		(substituted on) 66'
SH	21	TJ Perenara		(substituted on) 66'
FH	22	Beauden Barrett		(substituted on) 59'
CE	23	Ryan Crotty		(substituted on) 47'
Coach:
(New Zealand) Steve Hansen

Man of the Match:
Richie McCaw (New Zealand)

Touch judges:
Jérôme Garcès (France)
Dudley Phillips (Ireland)
Television match official:
Simon McDowell (Ireland)

Notes:

- New Zealand retain the Hillary Shield.
- George Kruis, Anthony Watson and Semesa Rokoduguni made their international debuts for England.

8 November 2014
14:30 GMT (UTC+0)

Wales	28–33	Australia
Try: Webb 2' c Cuthbert 24' c A. W. Jones 40' c Penalty try 64' c Con: Halfpenny (2/2) 4', 25'; Biggar (1/1) 40'; Priestland (1/1) 65'	Report	Try: Folau (2) 14' c, 20' c Kuridrani 28' c Con: Foley (3/3) 15', 21', 29'; Pen: Foley (3/3) 43', 56', 78'; Drop: Foley (1/1) 72'

Millennium Stadium, Cardiff
Attendance: 55,004
Referee: Craig Joubert (South Africa)

Team details

FB	15	Leigh Halfpenny	(substituted off) 29'
RW	14	Alex Cuthbert
OC	13	George North
IC	12	Jamie Roberts
LW	11	Liam Williams
FH	10	Dan Biggar	(substituted off) 47'
SH	9	Rhys Webb	(substituted off) 53'
N8	8	Taulupe Faletau
OF	7	Sam Warburton (c)
BF	6	Dan Lydiate	(substituted off) 75'
RL	5	Alun Wyn Jones
LL	4	Jake Ball	(substituted off) 68'
TP	3	Samson Lee	(substituted off) 68'
HK	2	Richard Hibbard	(substituted off) 57'
LP	1	Paul James	(substituted off) 57'
Replacements:
HK	16	Scott Baldwin	(substituted on) 57'
PR	17	Gethin Jenkins	(substituted on) 57'
PR	18	Rhodri Jones	(substituted on) 68'
LK	19	Bradley Davies	(substituted on) 68'
FL	20	Justin Tipuric	(substituted on) 75'
SH	21	Mike Phillips	(substituted on) 53'
FH	22	Rhys Priestland	(substituted on) 47'
CE	23	Cory Allen	(substituted on) 29'
Coach:
(New Zealand) Warren Gatland

FB	15	Israel Folau
RW	14	Adam Ashley-Cooper
OC	13	Tevita Kuridrani
IC	12	Christian Lealiifano	(substituted off) 76'
LW	11	Joe Tomane
FH	10	Bernard Foley
SH	9	Nick Phipps	(substituted off) 68'
N8	8	Ben McCalman
OF	7	Michael Hooper (c)
BF	6	Sean McMahon	(substituted off) 70'
RL	5	Rob Simmons	(substituted off) 67'
LL	4	Sam Carter	(substituted off) 50'
TP	3	Sekope Kepu	(substituted off) 65'
HK	2	Saia Fainga'a	(substituted off) 59'
LP	1	James Slipper	(substituted off) 73'
Replacements:
HK	16	James Hanson	(substituted on) 59'
PR	17	Tetera Faulkner	(substituted on) 73'
PR	18	Ben Alexander	(substituted on) 65'
LK	19	James Horwill	(substituted on) 67'
LK	20	Will Skelton	(substituted on) 50'
FL	21	Matt Hodgson	(substituted on) 70'
FH	22	Will Genia	(substituted on) 68'
WG	23	Rob Horne	(substituted on) 76'
Coach:
(Australia) Michael Cheika

Man of the Match:
Bernard Foley (Australia)

Touch judges:
Jaco Peyper (South Africa)
Peter Fitzgibbon (Ireland)
Television match official:
Graham Hughes (England)

Notes:

- Australia retain the James Bevan Trophy.
- Sean McMahon and Tetera Faulkner made their international debuts for Australia.
- Australia win their 10th consecutive match over Wales, surpassing their record of 9 consecutive wins over Wales.

8 November 2014
18:30 EET (UTC+2)

Romania	17–27	United States
Try: Penalty try 46' c Carpo 69' c Con: Vlaicu (2/2) 47', 70'; Pen: Vlaicu (1/4) 8'	Report	Try: Ngwenya 3' c T. Stanfill 29' c Niua 66' c Con: Siddall (3/3) 5', 30', 67'; Pen: Siddall (1/1) 40'; Drop: Petri (1/1) 58'

Stadionul Arcul de Triumf, Bucharest
Referee: Leighton Hodges (Wales)

Team details

FB	15	Cătălin Fercu
RW	14	Adrian Apostol
OC	13	Csaba Gál
IC	12	Florin Vlaicu
LW	11	Robert Neagu
FH	10	Dorin Manole
SH	9	Valentin Calafeteanu
N8	8	Daniel Carpo
OF	7	Ovidiu Tonița	(substituted off) 48'
BF	6	Mihai Macovei (c)
RL	5	Alin Coste	(substituted off) 55'
LL	4	Marius Sirbe
TP	3	Paulică Ion
HK	2	Otar Turashvili	12' to 24'		(substituted on) 63'
LP	1	Mihai Lazăr	(substituted off) 53'
Replacements:
HK	16	Andrei Rădoi	(substituted on) 12'	(substituted off) 24'	(substituted on) 63'
PR	17	Andrei Ursache	(substituted on) 53'
PR	18	Horaţiu Pungea
LK	19	Valentin Popârlan	(substituted on) 55'
N8	20	Vlad Nistor	(substituted on) 48'
SH	21	Florin Surugiu
FH	22	Catalin Dascălu
CE	23	Florin Ioniță
Coach:
(Wales) Lynn Howells

FB	15	Folau Niua
RW	14	Takudzwa Ngwenya
OC	13	Seamus Kelly
IC	12	Andrew Suniula
LW	11	Tim Stanfill
FH	10	Adam Siddall	(substituted off) 68'
SH	9	Mike Petri
N8	8	Matt Trouville
OF	7	John Quill
BF	6	Todd Clever (c)
RL	5	Louis Stanfill	(substituted off) 62'
LL	4	Tai Tuisamoa	(substituted off) 52'
TP	3	Olive Kilifi	(substituted off) 39'
HK	2	Phil Thiel	(substituted off) 52'
LP	1	Nicholas Wallace
Replacements:
HK	16	Tom Coolican	(substituted on) 52'
PR	17	Benjamin Tarr	(substituted on) 39'
PR	18	Mate Moeakiola
LK	19	Greg Peterson	(substituted on) 62'
N8	20	John Cullen	(substituted on) 52'
FL	21	Kyle Sumsion
FH	22	Shalom Suniula	(substituted on) 68'
CE	23	Roland Suniula
Coach:
(United States) Mike Tolkin

Touch judges:
Ian Davies (Wales)
Neil Hennessy (Wales)
Television match official:
Marshall Kilgore (Ireland)

Notes:

- Robert Neagu made his international debut for Romania.
- John Cullen, Greg Peterson, Benjamin Tarr and Matt Trouville made their international debuts for the United States.

8 November 2014
17:45 CET (UTC+1)

France	40–15	Fiji
Try: Thomas (3) 1' m, 53' c, 55' m Papé 66' c Fofana 72' c Con: Lopez (2/4) 54', 67'; Kockott (1/1) 72'; Pen: Lopez (3/4) 7', 28', 40'	Report	Try: Votu 45' m Nagusa 80+1' c Con: Nadolo (1/2) 80+2'; Pen: Nadolo (1/2) 43'

Stade Vélodrome, Marseille
Attendance: 44,228
Referee: Glen Jackson (New Zealand)

Team details

FB	15	Scott Spedding
RW	14	Yoann Huget
OC	13	Alexandre Dumoulin	(substituted off) 73'
IC	12	Wesley Fofana
LW	11	Teddy Thomas
FH	10	Camille Lopez	(substituted off) 67'
SH	9	Sébastien Tillous-Borde	(substituted off) 67'
N8	8	Damien Chouly	(substituted off) 67'
OF	7	Bernard Le Roux
BF	6	Thierry Dusautoir (c)
RL	5	Yoann Maestri	(substituted off) 72'
LL	4	Pascal Papé
TP	3	Nicolas Mas	(substituted off) 47'
HK	2	Guilhem Guirado	(substituted off) 50'
LP	1	Alexandre Menini	(substituted off) 57'
Replacements:
HK	16	Benjamin Kayser	(substituted on) 50'
PR	17	Xavier Chiocci	(substituted on) 57'
LK	18	Uini Atonio	(substituted on) 47'
LK	19	Alexandre Flanquart	(substituted on) 72'
FL	20	Charles Ollivon	(substituted on) 67'
SH	21	Rory Kockott	(substituted on) 67'
FH	22	Rémi Talès	(substituted on) 67'
CE	23	Mathieu Bastareaud	(substituted on) 73'
Coach:
(France) Philippe Saint-André

FB	15	Metuisela Talebula
RW	14	Watisoni Votu
OC	13	Asaeli Tikoirotuma
IC	12	Levani Botia	(substituted off) 40'
LW	11	Alipate Ratini	(substituted off) 58'
FH	10	Jonetani Ralulu
SH	9	Nikola Matawalu	(substituted off) 76'
N8	8	Masi Matadigo	(substituted off) 75'
OF	7	Akapusi Qera (c)
BF	6	Dominiko Waqaniburotu
RL	5	Apisalome Ratuniyarawa	(substituted off) 68'
LL	4	Leone Nakarawa
TP	3	Manasa Saulo	(substituted off) 75'
HK	2	Sunia Koto
LP	1	Campese Ma'afu	(substituted off) 64'
Replacements:
HK	16	Viliame Veikoso
PR	17	Jerry Yanuyanutawa	(substituted on) 64'
PR	18	Isei Colati	(substituted on) 75'
LK	19	Nemia Soqeta	(substituted on) 68'
FL	20	Malakai Ravulo	(substituted on) 75'
SH	21	Henry Seniloli	(substituted on) 76'
CE	22	Nemani Nadolo	(substituted on) 40'
FB	23	Timoci Nagusa	(substituted on) 58'
Coach:
(New Zealand) John McKee

Man of the Match:
Scott Spedding (France)

Touch judges:
Mike Fraser (New Zealand)
Federico Anselmi (Argentina)
Television match official:
Stefano Pennè (Italy)

Notes:

- Uini Atonio, Xavier Chiocci, Alexandre Dumoulin, Rory Kockott, Charles Ollivon, Scott Spedding and Teddy Thomas made their international debuts for France.
- Alipate Ratini and Nemia Soqeta made their international debuts for Fiji.

8 November 2014
17:30 WET (UTC+0)

Ireland	29–15	South Africa
Try: Ruddock 41' c Bowe 71' c Con: Sexton (2/2) 42', 73'; Pen: Sexton (4/4) 8', 23', 62', 70'; Madigan (1/1) 78'	Report	Try: Coetzee 56' c Pietersen 79' m Con: Pollard (1/1) 57'; Pen: Pollard (1/2) 37'

Aviva Stadium, Dublin
Attendance: 51,100
Referee: Romain Poite (France)

Team details

FB	15	Rob Kearney	(substituted off) 73'
RW	14	Tommy Bowe
OC	13	Jared Payne	(substituted off) 78'
IC	12	Robbie Henshaw
LW	11	Simon Zebo
FH	10	Johnny Sexton	(substituted off) 73'
SH	9	Conor Murray
N8	8	Jamie Heaslip
OF	7	Rhys Ruddock
BF	6	Peter O'Mahony	(substituted off) 70'
RL	5	Paul O'Connell (c)
LL	4	Devin Toner	(substituted off) 73'
TP	3	Mike Ross	(substituted off) 73'
HK	2	Seán Cronin	(substituted off) 57'
LP	1	Jack McGrath	(substituted off) 73'
Replacements:
HK	16	Richardt Strauss	(substituted on) 57'
PR	17	Dave Kilcoyne	(substituted on) 73'
PR	18	Rodney Ah You	(substituted on) 73'
LK	19	Mike McCarthy	(substituted on) 73'
FL	20	Tommy O'Donnell	(substituted on) 70'
SH	21	Eoin Reddan	(substituted on) 78'
FH	22	Ian Madigan	(substituted on) 73'
FB	23	Felix Jones	(substituted on) 73'
Coach:
(New Zealand) Joe Schmidt

FB	15	Willie le Roux
RW	14	Cornal Hendricks		(substituted off) 49'
OC	13	Jan Serfontein
IC	12	Jean de Villiers (c)
LW	11	Bryan Habana
FH	10	Handré Pollard		(substituted off) 66'
SH	9	Francois Hougaard		(substituted off) 56'
N8	8	Duane Vermeulen
OF	7	Oupa Mohojé		(substituted off) 46'
BF	6	Marcell Coetzee			(substituted off) 71'	(substituted on) 76'
RL	5	Victor Matfield
LL	4	Eben Etzebeth		(substituted off) 64'
TP	3	Jannie du Plessis		(substituted off) 70'
HK	2	Bismarck du Plessis		(substituted off) 50'	(substituted on) 71'	(substituted off) 76'
LP	1	Tendai Mtawarira		(substituted off) 66'
Replacements:
HK	16	Adriaan Strauss	(yellow card) 66' to 76'	(substituted on) 50'
PR	17	Trevor Nyakane		(substituted on) 66'
PR	18	Coenie Oosthuizen		(substituted on) 70'
LK	19	Bakkies Botha		(substituted on) 64'
FL	20	Schalk Burger		(substituted on) 46'
SH	21	Cobus Reinach		(substituted on) 56'
FH	22	Pat Lambie		(substituted on) 66'
CE	23	JP Pietersen		(substituted on) 49'
Coach:
(South Africa) Heyneke Meyer

Man of the Match:
Johnny Sexton (Ireland)

Touch judges:
JP Doyle (England)
Alexandre Ruiz (France)
Television match official:
Jim Yuille (Scotland)

Notes:

- Jared Payne made his international debut for Ireland.
- This was Ireland's first win over South Africa since 2009.
- Ireland became the first Six Nations team to beat South Africa since Scotland's 21–17 win in November 2010.

8 November 2014
17:30 GMT (UTC+0)

Scotland	41–31	Argentina
Try: R. Gray 5' c J. Gray 22' c Maitland 24' c Hogg 46' c Seymour 70' c Con: Laidlaw (4/4) 7', 23', 26', 47'; Weir (1/1) 71'; Pen: Laidlaw (2/4) 32', 61'	Report	Try: Ortega Desio 1' c Penalty try 69' c Cubelli(2) 73' c, 79' c Con: Sánchez (1/1) 2'; Hernández (3/3) 69', 74', 80'; Pen: Sánchez (1/2) 12'

Murrayfield Stadium, Edinburgh
Attendance: 36,764
Referee: Wayne Barnes (England)

Team details

FB	15	Stuart Hogg
RW	14	Sean Maitland
OC	13	Mark Bennett
IC	12	Alex Dunbar		(substituted off) 75'
LW	11	Tommy Seymour
FH	10	Finn Russell		(substituted off) 64'
SH	9	Greig Laidlaw (c)		(substituted off) 63'	(substituted on) 78'
N8	8	Adam Ashe
OF	7	Blair Cowan		(substituted off) 59'
BF	6	Rob Harley	(yellow card) 63' to 73'
RL	5	Jonny Gray
LL	4	Richie Gray		(substituted off) 68'
TP	3	Euan Murray		(substituted off) 70'
HK	2	Ross Ford		(substituted off) 63'
LP	1	Alasdair Dickinson		(substituted off) 68'
Replacements:
HK	16	Scott Lawson		(substituted on) 63'
PR	17	Gordon Reid		(substituted on) 68'
PR	18	Geoff Cross		(substituted on) 70'
LK	19	Jim Hamilton	(yellow card) 73' to 80'	(substituted on) 68'
FL	20	Alasdair Strokosch		(substituted on) 59'
SH	21	Henry Pyrgos		(substituted on) 63'	(substituted off) 78'
FH	22	Duncan Weir		(substituted on) 64'
CE	23	Sean Lamont		(substituted on) 75'
Coach:
(New Zealand) Vern Cotter

FB	15	Joaquín Tuculet
RW	14	Juan Imhoff	(yellow card) 20' to 30'
OC	13	Marcelo Bosch		(substituted off) 61'
IC	12	Juan Martín Hernández
LW	11	Manuel Montero
FH	10	Nicolás Sánchez		(substituted off) 52'
SH	9	Martín Landajo		(substituted off) 57'
N8	8	Leonardo Senatore
OF	7	Javier Ortega Desio
BF	6	Rodrigo Baez		(substituted off) 16'
RL	5	Juan Cruz Guillemaín		(substituted off) 68'
LL	4	Tomás Lavanini
TP	3	Ramiro Herrera		(substituted off) 45'
HK	2	Agustín Creevy (c)		(substituted off) 19'
LP	1	Marcos Ayerza		(substituted off) 61'
Replacements:
HK	16	Matías Cortese		(substituted on) 19'
PR	17	Lucas Noguera Paz		(substituted on) 61'
PR	18	Nahuel Tetaz Chaparro		(substituted on) 45'
LK	19	Lucas Ponce		(substituted on) 68'
FL	20	Facundo Isa		(substituted on) 16'
SH	21	Tomás Cubelli		(substituted on) 57'
FH	22	Santiago González Iglesias		(substituted on) 52'
WG	23	Horacio Agulla		(substituted on) 61'
Coach:
(Argentina) Daniel Hourcade

Man of the Match:
Greig Laidlaw (Scotland)

Touch judges:
George Clancy (Ireland)
Marius Mitrea (Italy)
Television match official:
Eric Gauzins (France)

Notes:

- Mark Bennett made his international debut for Scotland.
- Brothers Jonny and Richie Gray became the 21st set of brothers to play for Scotland together.
- Juan Cruz Guillemaín and Facundo Isa made their international debuts for Argentina.
- Juan Martín Hernández earned his 50th test cap for Argentina.
- This was Scotland's first win over Argentina at Murrayfield since their first ever meeting in 1990.

=== 14/15/16 November ===
14 November 2014
17:15 CET (UTC+1)

Italy	18–20	Argentina
Pen: Haimona (5/6) 3', 14', 20', 22', 49'; Orquera (1/1) 72'	Report	Try: González Amorosino 39' c De la Fuente 57' c Con: Hernández (2/2) 39', 58'; Pen: Hernández (1/2) 11'; Sánchez (1/1) 68'

Stadio Luigi Ferraris, Genoa
Attendance: 12,129
Referee: Craig Joubert (South Africa)

Team details

FB	15	Andrea Masi
LW	14	Leonardo Sarto
OC	13	Michele Campagnaro
IC	12	Luca Morisi
RW	11	Luke McLean	(substituted off) 73'
FH	10	Kelly Haimona	(substituted off) 70'
SH	9	Edoardo Gori	(substituted off) 70'
N8	8	Sergio Parisse (c)
OF	7	Simone Favaro	(substituted off) 56'
BF	6	Alessandro Zanni
RL	5	Joshua Furno	(substituted off) 70'
LL	4	Quintin Geldenhuys
TP	3	Martin Castrogiovanni	(substituted off) 56'
HK	2	Leonardo Ghiraldini	(substituted off) 73'
LP	1	Matías Agüero	(substituted off) 61'
Replacements:
HK	16	Andrea Manici	(substituted on) 73'
PR	17	Alberto De Marchi	(substituted on) 61'
PR	18	Dario Chistolini	(substituted on) 56'
LK	19	Marco Bortolami	(substituted on) 70'
FL	20	Francesco Minto	(substituted on) 56'
SH	21	Guglielmo Palazzani	(substituted on) 70'
FH	22	Luciano Orquera	(substituted on) 70'
WG	23	Giulio Toniolatti	(substituted on) 73'
Coach:
(France) Jacques Brunel

FB	15	Joaquín Tuculet	(substituted off) 40'
RW	14	Lucas González Amorosino
OC	13	Horacio Agulla
IC	12	Jerónimo de la Fuente
LW	11	Manuel Montero
FH	10	Juan Martín Hernández				(substituted off) 61'
SH	9	Tomás Cubelli (c)	(substituted off) 61'
N8	8	Leonardo Senatore
OF	7	Javier Ortega Desio
BF	6	Facundo Isa
RL	5	Tomás Lavanini
LL	4	Guido Petti	(substituted off) 67'
TP	3	Nahuel Tetaz Chaparro	(substituted off) 52'
HK	2	Matías Cortese	(substituted off) 56'
LP	1	Marcos Ayerza	(substituted off) 64'
Replacements:
HK	16	Santiago Iglesias	(substituted on) 56'
PR	17	Lucas Noguera Paz	(substituted on) 64'
PR	18	Ramiro Herrera	(substituted on) 52'
LK	19	Lucas Ponce	(substituted on) 67'
FL	20	Tomás Lezana
SH	21	Martín Landajo	(substituted on) 61'
FH	22	Nicolás Sánchez		(substituted on) 44'	(substituted off) 50'	(substituted on) 61'
CE	23	Matías Moroni	(substituted on) 40'	44' to 50'
Coach:
(Argentina) Daniel Hourcade

Man of the Match:
Andrea Masi (Italy)

Touch judges:
Glen Jackson (New Zealand)
Ian Davies (Wales)
Television match official:
Simon McDowell (Ireland)

Notes:

- Lucas Ponce and Guido Petti (both Argentina) made their international debuts.
- This fixture was originally scheduled for 15 November 15:00 CET kick off. But the match was brought forward by the FIR because of the bad weather expected to hit the region.

14 November 2014
19:00 CET (UTC+1)

French Barbarians	35–14	Namibia
Try: Capó Ortega 12' c Plisson 16' c Palisson 26' c Bias 37' c Fresia 42' c Con: Plisson (5/5) 13', 17', 27', 38', 42'	Report	Try: Van Lill 5' c Kotzé 32' c Con: Kotzé (1/1) 6'; R. De la Harpe (1/1) 33'

Stade Mayol, Toulon
Referee: Leighton Hodges (Wales)

14 November 2014
19:00 CET (UTC+1)

Samoa	23–13	Canada
Try: Perenise 60' c W. Stanley 72' c Con: M. Stanley (2/2) 61', 73'; Pen: M. Stanley (3/6) 12', 18', 30'	Report	Try: Trainor 70' c Con: Pritchard (1/1) 71'; Pen: McRorie (2/2) 34', 42'

Stade de la Rabine, Vannes, France
Attendance: 5,000
Referee: George Clancy (Ireland)

Team details

FB	15	Ahsee Tuala	(substituted off) 55'
RW	14	Alofa Alofa	(substituted off) 74'
OC	13	Rey Lee-Lo
IC	12	Alapati Leiua
LW	11	David Lemi (c)
FH	10	Michael Stanley
SH	9	Kahn Fotuali'i	(substituted off) 76'
N8	8	Ofisa Treviranus
OF	7	TJ Ioane	(substituted off) 65'
BF	6	Maurie Fa'asavalu
RL	5	Daniel Leo	(substituted off) 55'
LL	4	Filo Paulo
TP	3	Census Johnston	(substituted off) 55'
HK	2	Ole Avei	(substituted off) 69'
LP	1	Sakaria Taulafo	(substituted off) 76'
Replacements:
HK	16	Manu Leiataua	(substituted on) 69'
PR	17	Viliamu Afatia	(substituted on) 76'
PR	18	Anthony Perenise	(substituted on) 55'
LK	19	Kane Thompson	(substituted on) 55'
FL	20	Jack Lam	(substituted on) 65'
SH	21	Pete Cowley	(substituted on) 76'
CE	22	Winston Stanley	(substituted on) 55'
FB	23	Fa'atoina Autagavaia	(substituted on) 73'
Coach:
(Samoa) Stephen Betham

FB	15	James Pritchard
RW	14	Jeff Hassler
OC	13	Conor Trainor	(yellow card) 27' to 37'
IC	12	Ciaran Hearn		(substituted off) 73'
LW	11	D. T. H. van der Merwe
FH	10	Connor Braid		(substituted off) 64'
SH	9	Gordon McRorie		(substituted off) 63'
N8	8	Jebb Sinclair
OF	7	Nanyak Dala
BF	6	Kyle Gilmour		(substituted off) 55'
RL	5	Brett Beukeboom		(substituted off) 31'
LL	4	Jamie Cudmore
TP	3	Jason Marshall		5' to 10'		(substituted off) 71'
HK	2	Aaron Carpenter		(substituted off) 69'
LP	1	Hubert Buydens (c)		(substituted off) 71'
Replacements:
HK	16	Ray Barkwill		(substituted on) 69'
PR	17	Jake Illnicki		(substituted on) 5'	(substituted off) 10'	(substituted on) 71'
PR	18	Andrew Tiedemann		(substituted on) 71'
LK	19	Jon Phelan		(substituted on) 31'
N8	20	Richard Thorpe		(substituted on) 55'
SH	21	Sean White		(substituted on) 63'
FH	22	Pat Parfrey		(substituted on) 64'
FB	23	Jordan Wilson-Ross		(substituted on) 73'
Coach:
(New Zealand) Kieran Crowley

Touch judges:
Peter Fitzgibbon (Ireland)
Alexandre Ruiz (France)
Television match official:
Geoff Warren (England)

Notes:

- Alofa Alofa, TJ Ioane, Rey Lee-Lo and Ahsee Tuala made their international debuts for Samoa.
- Richard Thorpe made his international debut for Canada.

15 November 2014
18:00 HKT (UTC+8)

Hong Kong	29–37	Russia
Try: T. McQueen (2) 15' c, 50' c Varty 43' c Woodward 49' m Con: Hood (3/4) 16', 44', 51'; Pen: Hood (1/2) 34'	Report	Try: Galinovskiy (2) 6' c, 21' m Artemyev 31' c Serkov 39' m Penalty try 61' c Con: Gaisin (3/5) 7', 32', 62'; Pen: Gaisin (2/3) 11', 55'

Hong Kong Football Club Stadium, Hong Kong
Referee: Shuhei Kubo (Japan)

Team details

FB	15	Alex McQueen
RW	14	Tom McQueen
OC	13	Max Woodward
IC	12	Tyler Spitz
LW	11	Rowan Varty
FH	10	Jamie Hood
SH	9	Duncan Pollock
N8	8	Josh Li
OF	7	Matt Lamming
BF	6	Bill Brant
RL	5	Jack Delaforce
LL	4	Paul Dywer (c)
TP	3	Jack Nielsen
HK	2	Alex Harris
LP	1	Leon Wei Hon-Sum
Replacements:
PR	16	Jack Parfitt
PR	17	John Aikemn
HK	18	Lachlan Chubb
FL	19	Jack Capon
FL	20	Andrew Bridle
SH	21	Charles Cheung Ho-Ning
FH	22	Reece Hamon
WG	23	Salom Yiu Kam-Shing
Coach:
(Scotland) Andrew Hall

FB	15	Vasily Artemyev (c)
RW	14	Mikhail Babaev
OC	13	German Davydov
IC	12	Vladimir Rudenko
LW	11	Igor Galinovskiy
FH	10	Ramil Gaisin
SH	9	Alexey Shcherban
N8	8	Viktor Gresev
OF	7	Pavel Butenko
BF	6	Vitaly Zhivatov
RL	5	Andrei Garbuzov
LL	4	Nikolay Serkov
TP	3	Evgeni Pronenko
HK	2	Stanislav Selskiy
LP	1	Sergey Sekisov
Replacements:
HK	16	Sergey Chernyshev
PR	17	Grigory Tsnobiladze
PR	18	Andrei Igretsov
LK	19	Nikolay Pochechuyev
FL	20	Mikhai Sidorov
SH	21	Vasily Dorofeyev
FH	22	Yuri Kushnarev
CE	23	Dimitry Gerasimov
Coach:
(France) Raphaël Saint-André

Touch judges:
Akihisa Aso (Japan)
Takashi Harada (Japan)

Notes:

- Russia wins the Ustinov Cup series 2–0.

15 November 2014
16:00 EET (UTC+2)

Romania	13–18	Japan
Try: Penalty try 27' c Con: Vlaicu (1/1) 29'; Pen: Vlaicu (2/3) 17', 79'	Report (In Romanian)	Pen: Goromaru (6/6) 14', 32', 40', 45', 57', 78'

Stadionul Arcul de Triumf, Bucharest
Attendance: 2,715
Referee: Stuart Berry (South Africa)

Team details

FB	15	Cătălin Fercu
RW	14	Dorin Manole
OC	13	Csaba Gál
IC	12	Catalin Dascălu
LW	11	Ionuț Botezatu		(substituted off) 75'
FH	10	Florin Vlaicu
SH	9	Valentin Calafeteanu
N8	8	Daniel Carpo		(substituted off) 38'
OF	7	Mihai Macovei (c)
BF	6	Ovidiu Tonița		(substituted off) 59'
RL	5	Valentin Popârlan
LL	4	Marius Sirbe	(yellow card) 13' to 23'
TP	3	Paulică Ion		(substituted off) 66'
HK	2	Andrei Rădoi		(substituted off) 55'
LP	1	Andrei Ursache		(substituted off) 71'
Replacements:
HK	16	Otar Turashvili		(substituted on) 55'
PR	17	Mihai Lazăr		(substituted on) 71'
PR	18	Horaţiu Pungea		(substituted on) 66'
LK	19	Alin Coste		(substituted on) 59'
FL	20	Stelian Burcea		(substituted on) 38'
SH	21	Grigoraș Diaconescu
WG	22	Florin Ioniță		(substituted on) 75'
WG	23	Robert Neagu
Coach:
(Wales) Lynn Howells

FB	15	Ayumu Goromaru
RW	14	Karne Hesketh	(substituted off) 74'
OC	13	Kotaro Matsushima
IC	12	Male Sa'u
LW	11	Akihito Yamada	(substituted off) 38'
FH	10	Kosei Ono
SH	9	Atsushi Hiwasa
N8	8	Amanaki Mafi
OF	7	Michael Leitch (c)	(substituted off) 50'
BF	6	Hendrik Tui
RL	5	Shinya Makabe	(substituted off) 49'
LL	4	Shoji Ito
TP	3	Kensuke Hatakeyama	(substituted off) 79'
HK	2	Takeshi Kizu	(substituted off) 77'
LP	1	Masataka Mikami	(substituted off) 62'
Replacements:
PR	16	Keita Inagaki	(substituted on) 62'
HK	17	Hiroki Yuhara	(substituted on) 77'
PR	18	Hiroshi Yamashita	(substituted on) 79'
LK	19	Hitoshi Ono	(substituted on) 49'
N8	20	Hayden Hopgood	(substituted on) 50'
SH	21	Yuki Yatomi
FH	22	Harumichi Tatekawa	(substituted on) 38'
WG	23	Toshiaki Hirose	(substituted on) 74'
Coach:
(Australia) Eddie Jones

Touch judges:
Greg Garner (England)
RFU Appointment (England)
Television match official:
Marshall Kilgore (Ireland)

Notes:

- Daniel Carpo earned his 50th test cap for Romania.
- Karne Hesketh, Keita Inagaki and Amanaki Mafi made their international debuts for Japan.

15 November 2014
14:30 GMT (UTC+0)

England	28–31	South Africa
Try: Wilson 44' c Morgan 47' c Barritt 78' m Con: Farrell (2/2) 45', 48'; Pen: Farrell (2/2) 27', 35'; Ford (1/1) 67'	Report	Try: Serfontein 15' c Reinach 40' c Burger 53' m Con: Lambie (2/3) 15', 41'; Pen: Lambie (3/4) 10', 32', 66'; Drop: Lambie (1/1) 76'

Twickenham, London
Attendance: 82,000
Referee: Steve Walsh (Australia)

Team details

FB	15	Mike Brown
RW	14	Anthony Watson
OC	13	Brad Barritt
IC	12	Kyle Eastmond
LW	11	Jonny May
FH	10	Owen Farrell		(substituted off) 64'
SH	9	Danny Care		(substituted off) 64'
N8	8	Billy Vunipola		(substituted off) 43'
OF	7	Chris Robshaw (c)
BF	6	Tom Wood		(substituted off) 60'	(substituted on) 70'
RL	5	Courtney Lawes
LL	4	Dave Attwood		(substituted off) 66'
TP	3	David Wilson		(substituted off) 72'
HK	2	Dylan Hartley	(yellow card) 60' to 70'		(substituted off) 70'
LP	1	Joe Marler		(substituted off) 66'
Replacements:
HK	16	Rob Webber		(substituted on) 60'
PR	17	Matt Mullan		(substituted on) 66'
PR	18	Kieran Brookes		(substituted on) 72'
LK	19	George Kruis		(substituted on) 66'
N8	20	Ben Morgan		(substituted on) 43'
SH	21	Ben Youngs		(substituted on) 64'
FH	22	George Ford		(substituted on) 64'
WG	23	Marland Yarde
Coach:
(England) Stuart Lancaster

FB	15	Willie le Roux
RW	14	JP Pietersen
OC	13	Jan Serfontein
IC	12	Jean de Villiers (c)
LW	11	Bryan Habana
FH	10	Pat Lambie
SH	9	Cobus Reinach
N8	8	Duane Vermeulen
OF	7	Schalk Burger		(substituted off) 77'
BF	6	Marcell Coetzee
RL	5	Victor Matfield	(yellow card) 44' to 54'
LL	4	Eben Etzebeth		(substituted off) 64'
TP	3	Jannie du Plessis		(substituted off) 64'
HK	2	Adriaan Strauss		(substituted off) 60'
LP	1	Tendai Mtawarira		(substituted off) 74'
Replacements:
HK	16	Bismarck du Plessis		(substituted on) 60'
PR	17	Trevor Nyakane		(substituted on) 74'
PR	18	Coenie Oosthuizen		(substituted on) 64'
LK	19	Bakkies Botha		(substituted on) 64'
FL	20	Oupa Mohojé		(substituted on) 77'
SH	21	Francois Hougaard
FH	22	Handré Pollard
WG	23	Cornal Hendricks
Coach:
(South Africa) Heyneke Meyer

Man of the Match:
Schalk Burger (South Africa)

Touch judges:
Jérôme Garcès (France)
Nick Briant (New Zealand)
Television match official:
Eric Gauzins (France)

Notes:

- Danny Care earned his 50th test cap for England.
- With this loss, England lose their fifth consecutive match, their worst run of defeats since their 7 consecutive losses in 2006 - although four of the five were against world champions New Zealand.

15 November 2014
14:30 WET (UTC+0)

Wales	17–13	Fiji
Try: North 6' m Cuthbert 18' m Penalty try 36' c Con: Priestland (1/3) 37'	Report	Try: Nadolo 77' c Con: Nadolo (1/1) 78'; Pen: Nadolo (2/4) 22', 28'

Millennium Stadium, Cardiff
Attendance: 61,326
Referee: Pascal Gaüzère (France)

Team details

FB	15	Liam Williams
RW	14	Alex Cuthbert
OC	13	Scott Williams
IC	12	Jamie Roberts
LW	11	George North
FH	10	Rhys Priestland
SH	9	Mike Phillips
N8	8	Taulupe Faletau
OF	7	Justin Tipuric
BF	6	Dan Lydiate	(substituted off) 59'
RL	5	Luke Charteris	(substituted off) 65'
LL	4	Bradley Davies
TP	3	Samson Lee	(substituted off) 59'
HK	2	Scott Baldwin
LP	1	Gethin Jenkins (c)	(substituted off) 65'
Replacements:
HK	16	Emyr Phillips
PR	17	Nicky Smith	(substituted on) 65'
PR	18	Rhodri Jones	(substituted on) 59'
LK	19	Alun Wyn Jones	(substituted on) 65'
FL	20	James King	(substituted on) 59'
SH	21	Rhodri Williams
FH	22	James Hook
CE	23	Cory Allen
Coach:
(New Zealand) Warren Gatland

FB	15	Metuisela Talebula
RW	14	Waisea Nayacalevu
OC	13	Vereniki Goneva		(substituted off) 71'
IC	12	Nemani Nadolo
LW	11	Asaeli Tikoirotuma
FH	10	Josh Matavesi
SH	9	Nikola Matawalu		(substituted off) 71'
N8	8	Masi Matadigo		(substituted off) 43'	(substituted on) 46'	(substituted off) 60'
OF	7	Akapusi Qera (c)
BF	6	Dominiko Waqaniburotu		(substituted off) 71'
RL	5	Tevita Cavubati
LL	4	Leone Nakarawa		(substituted off) 65'
TP	3	Manasa Saulo		(substituted off) 71'
HK	2	Sunia Koto
LP	1	Campese Ma'afu	(yellow card) 36' to 46' (red card) 52'
Replacements:
HK	16	Talemaitoga Tuapati
PR	17	Jerry Yanuyanutawa		(substituted on) 43'	(substituted off) 46'	(substituted on) 60'
PR	18	Isei Colati		(substituted on) 71'
LK	19	Nemia Soqeta		(substituted on) 65'
FL	20	Malakai Ravulo		(substituted on) 71'
SH	21	Henry Seniloli		(substituted on) 71'
FH	22	Jonetani Ralulu
FB	23	Timoci Nagusa		(substituted on) 71'
Coach:
(New Zealand) John McKee

Man of the Match:
Liam Williams (Wales)

Touch judges:
Jaco Peyper (South Africa)
Dudley Phillips (Ireland)
Television match official:
Carlo Damasco (France)

Notes:

- Nicky Smith (Wales) made his international debut.

15 November 2014
16:45 GMT (UTC+0)

Tonga	40–12	United States
Try: Vainikolo 13' m Maʻafu 49' c Lilo 52' c Halaifonua 55' m Latu 78' c Con: Morath (2/4) 50', 54'; Fosita (1/1) 79'; Pen: Morath (3/4) 7', 20', 27'	Report	Try: Stanfill 3' c Quill 38' m Con: Niua (1/2) 4'

Kingsholm Stadium, Gloucester, England
Attendance: 8,949
Referee: Mike Fraser (New Zealand)

Team details

FB	15	Vunga Lilo
RW	14	David Halaifonua	(substituted off) 64'
OC	13	Siale Piutau
IC	12	Hemani Paea
LW	11	Fetuʻu Vainikolo
FH	10	Kurt Morath	(substituted off) 54'
SH	9	Sonatane Takulua	(substituted off) 69'
N8	8	Viliami Maʻafu
OF	7	Nili Latu (c)
BF	6	Sione Kalamafoni	(substituted off) 69'
RL	5	Joe Tuineau	(substituted off) 69'
LL	4	Tukulua Lokotui
TP	3	Paea Faʻanunu	(substituted off) 57'
HK	2	Aleki Lutui	(substituted off) 57'
LP	1	Tevita Mailau	(substituted off) 59'
Replacements:
HK	16	Elvis Taione	(substituted on) 57'
PR	17	Sione Lea	(substituted on) 59'
PR	18	Sila Puafisi	(substituted on) 57'
LK	19	Lisiate Faʻaoso	(substituted on) 69'
LK	20	Hale T-Pole	(substituted on) 69'
SH	21	Taniela Moa	(substituted on) 69'
FH	22	Latiume Fosita	(substituted on) 54'
WG	23	Otulea Katoa	(substituted on) 64'
Coach:
(Tonga) Mana Otai

FB	15	Folau Niua
RW	14	Tim Maupin
OC	13	Seamus Kelly
IC	12	Andrew Suniula		(substituted off) 57'
LW	11	Tim Stanfill
FH	10	Shalom Suniula
SH	9	Mike Petri
N8	8	Matt Trouville		(substituted off) 62'
OF	7	John Quill		(substituted off) 64'
BF	6	Scott LaValla (c)	(yellow card) 24' to 34'
RL	5	Greg Peterson		(substituted off) 57'
LL	4	John Cullen
TP	3	Mate Moeakiola		(substituted off) 69'
HK	2	Phil Thiel		(substituted off) 62'
LP	1	Nicholas Wallace
Replacements:
HK	16	Tom Coolican		(substituted on) 62'
PR	17	Angus Maclellan
PR	18	Benjamin Tarr		(substituted on) 69'
LK	19	Tai Tuisamoa		(substituted on) 57'
FL	20	Kyle Sumsion		(substituted on) 64'
FL	21	Todd Clever		(substituted on) 62'
CE	22	Thretton Palamo		(substituted on) 57'
CE	23	Ronald McLean
Coach:
(United States) Mike Tolkin

Touch judges:
Andrew McMenemy (Scotland)
Lloyd Linton (Scotland)

Notes:

- Sione Lea made his international debut for Tonga.

15 November 2014
17:30 GMT (UTC+0)

Scotland	16–24	New Zealand
Try: Seymour 11' c Con: Laidlaw (1/1) 12'; Pen: Laidlaw (3/4) 35', 45', 66'	Report	Try: Vito 9' m Thrush 73'; Con: Slade (1/1) 74'; Pen: Carter (3/4) 26', 31', 40'; Slade (1/1) 64'

Murrayfield Stadium, Edinburgh
Attendance: 66,004
Referee: Romain Poite (France)

Team details

FB	15	Stuart Hogg
RW	14	Sean Maitland
OC	13	Mark Bennett	(substituted off) 12'
IC	12	Alex Dunbar
LW	11	Tommy Seymour
FH	10	Finn Russell	(substituted off) 25'	(substituted on) 31'	(substituted off) 60'
SH	9	Greig Laidlaw (c)	(substituted off) 74'
N8	8	Adam Ashe	(substituted off) 56'
OF	7	Blair Cowan	(substituted off) 72'
BF	6	Rob Harley
RL	5	Jonny Gray
LL	4	Richie Gray
TP	3	Euan Murray	(substituted off) 30'
HK	2	Ross Ford	(substituted off) 74'
LP	1	Alasdair Dickinson	(substituted off) 76'
Replacements:
HK	16	Fraser Brown	(substituted on) 74'
PR	17	Gordon Reid	(substituted on) 76'
PR	18	Geoff Cross	(substituted on) 30'
FL	19	David Denton	(substituted on) 72'
N8	20	Johnnie Beattie	(substituted on) 56'
SH	21	Chris Cusiter	(substituted on) 74'
FH	22	Duncan Weir	(substituted on) 25'	(substituted off) 31'	(substituted on) 60'
CE	23	Sean Lamont	(substituted on) 12'
Coach:
(New Zealand) Vern Cotter

FB	15	Ben Smith
RW	14	Colin Slade
OC	13	Malakai Fekitoa	(substituted off) 55'
IC	12	Ryan Crotty
LW	11	Charles Piutau
FH	10	Dan Carter	(substituted off) 55'
SH	9	TJ Perenara	(substituted off) 78'
N8	8	Victor Vito	(substituted off) 37'
OF	7	Sam Cane
BF	6	Richie McCaw (c)
RL	5	Dominic Bird	(substituted off) 51'
LL	4	Jeremy Thrush
TP	3	Charlie Faumuina	(substituted off) 55'
HK	2	James Parsons	(substituted off) 46'
LP	1	Joe Moody	(substituted off) 51'
Replacements:
HK	16	Dane Coles	(substituted on) 46'
PR	17	Wyatt Crockett	(substituted on) 51'
PR	18	Ben Franks	(substituted on) 55'
LK	19	Luke Romano	(substituted on) 51'
FL	20	Liam Messam	(substituted on) 37'
SH	21	Augustine Pulu	(substituted on) 78'
CE	22	Sonny Bill Williams	(substituted on) 55'
WG	23	Julian Savea	(substituted on) 55'
Coach:
(New Zealand) Steve Hansen

Man of the Match:
Jeremy Thrush (New Zealand)

Touch judges:
John Lacey (Ireland)
Peter Fitzgibbon (Ireland)
Television match official:
Gareth Simmonds (Wales)

Notes:

- James Parsons made his international debut for New Zealand.

15 November 2014
21:00 CET (UTC+1)

France	29–26	Australia
Try: Tillous-Borde 6' c Thomas 28'c Con: Lopez (2/2) 8', 29'; Pen: Lopez (4/5) 16', 43', 48', 62'; Kockott (1/1) 71'	Report	Try: Ashley-Cooper 34' c Simmons 76' c Con: Foley (2/2) 36', 76'; Pen: Foley (4/4) 10', 19', 39', 53'

Stade de France, Saint-Denis
Attendance: 75,000
Referee: Nigel Owens (Wales)

Team details

FB	15	Scott Spedding
RW	14	Yoann Huget
OC	13	Alexandre Dumoulin		(substituted off) 40'
IC	12	Wesley Fofana
LW	11	Teddy Thomas
FH	10	Camille Lopez		(substituted off) 69'
SH	9	Sébastien Tillous-Borde		(substituted off) 53'
N8	8	Damien Chouly
OF	7	Bernard Le Roux		(substituted off) 74'
BF	6	Thierry Dusautoir (c)
RL	5	Yoann Maestri
LL	4	Pascal Papé		(substituted off) 56'
TP	3	Nicolas Mas		(substituted off) 40'
HK	2	Guilhem Guirado		(substituted off) 49'
LP	1	Alexandre Menini		(substituted off) 56'
Replacements:
HK	16	Benjamin Kayser		(substituted on) 49'
PR	17	Uini Atonio		(substituted on) 40'
PR	18	Xavier Chiocci		(substituted on) 56'
LK	19	Sebastien Vahaamahina		(substituted on) 56'
FL	20	Yannick Nyanga		(substituted on) 74'
SH	21	Rory Kockott		(substituted on) 53'
FH	22	Rémi Talès	(yellow card) 73' to 80'	(substituted on) 69'
CE	23	Mathieu Bastareaud		(substituted on) 40'
Coach:
(France) Philippe Saint-André

FB	15	Israel Folau
RW	14	Adam Ashley-Cooper
OC	13	Tevita Kuridrani
IC	12	Christian Lealiifano	(substituted off) 44'
LW	11	Joe Tomane	(substituted off) 60'
FH	10	Bernard Foley
SH	9	Nick Phipps	(substituted off) 69'
N8	8	Ben McCalman
OF	7	Michael Hooper (c)
BF	6	Sean McMahon	(substituted off) 69'
RL	5	Rob Simmons
LL	4	James Horwill	(substituted off) 49'
TP	3	Sekope Kepu	(substituted off) 65'
HK	2	Saia Fainga'a	(substituted off) 69'
LP	1	James Slipper	(substituted off) 61'
Replacements:
HK	16	James Hanson	(substituted on) 69'
PR	17	Benn Robinson	(substituted on) 61'
PR	18	Ben Alexander	(substituted on) 65'
LK	19	Will Skelton	(substituted on) 49'
FL	20	Matt Hodgson	(substituted on) 69'
SH	21	Will Genia	(substituted on) 69'
FH	22	Quade Cooper	(substituted on) 60'
WG	23	Rob Horne	(substituted on) 44'
Coach:
(Australia) Michael Cheika

Man of the Match:
Camille Lopez (France)

Touch judges:
Wayne Barnes (England)
Marius Mitrea (Italy)
Television match official:
Graham Hughes (England)

Notes:

- Sekope Kepu earned his 50th test cap for Australia.
- France reclaim the Trophée des Bicentenaires after losing it in June 2014.

16 November 2014
14:30 WET (UTC+0)

Ireland	49–7	Georgia
Try: Kilcoyne 42' c Strauss 50' c Zebo 61' c Jones (2) 67' m, 71' c Olding 73' c Con: Madigan (5/6) 42', 51', 63', 72', 74'; Pen: Madigan (3/4) 11', 16', 40'	Report	Try: Nemsadze 56' c Con: Kvirikashvili (1/1) 56'

Aviva Stadium, Dublin
Attendance: 40,156
Referee: JP Doyle (England)

Team details

FB	15	Felix Jones
RW	14	Craig Gilroy
OC	13	Darren Cave
IC	12	Gordon D'Arcy	(substituted off) 62'
LW	11	Simon Zebo	(substituted off) 62'
FH	10	Ian Madigan
SH	9	Eoin Reddan (c)	(substituted off) 62'
N8	8	Robbie Diack
OF	7	Tommy O'Donnell
BF	6	Dominic Ryan
RL	5	Mike McCarthy	(substituted off) 62'
LL	4	Dave Foley	(substituted off) 62'
TP	3	Mike Ross	(substituted off) 46'
HK	2	Richardt Strauss	(substituted off) 62'
LP	1	Dave Kilcoyne
Replacements:
HK	16	Seán Cronin	(substituted on) 62'
PR	17	Jack McGrath
PR	18	Rodney Ah You	(substituted on) 46'
LK	19	Devin Toner	(substituted on) 62'
N8	20	Robin Copeland	(substituted on) 62'
SH	21	Kieran Marmion	(substituted on) 62'
FH	22	Ian Keatley	(substituted on) 62'
CE	23	Stuart Olding	(substituted on) 62'
Coach:
(New Zealand) Joe Schmidt

FB	15	Merab Kvirikashvili
RW	14	Sandro Todua
OC	13	Davit Kacharava (c)
IC	12	Merab Sharikadze
LW	11	Tamaz Mchedlidze		(substituted off) 54'
FH	10	Lasha Khmaladze		(substituted off) 54'
SH	9	Giorgi Begadze	(yellow card) 40' to 50'	(substituted off) 57'
N8	8	Dimitri Basilaia	(yellow card) 60' to 70'
OF	7	Viktor Kolelishvili		(substituted off) 57'
BF	6	Giorgi Tkhilaishvili
RL	5	Giorgi Nemsadze
LL	4	Konstantin Mikautadze		(substituted off) 49'
TP	3	Davit Kubriashvili		(substituted off) 51'
HK	2	Shalva Mamukashvili		(substituted off) 51'
LP	1	Mikheil Nariashvili		(substituted off) 51'
Replacements:
HK	16	Simon Maisuradze		(substituted on) 51'
PR	17	Zurab Zhvania		(substituted on) 51'
PR	18	Levan Chilachava		(substituted on) 51'
LK	19	Levan Datunashvili		(substituted on) 49'
FL	20	Giorgi Chkhaidze		(substituted on) 57'
SH	21	Vazha Khutsishvili		(substituted on) 57'
FH	22	Lasha Malaghuradze		(substituted on) 54'
WG	23	Muraz Giorgadze		(substituted on) 54'
Coach:
(New Zealand) Milton Haig

Man of the Match:
Dave Foley (Ireland)

Touch judges:
Luke Pearce (England)
Federico Anselmi (Argentina)
Television match official:
Jim Yuille (Scotland)

Notes:

- Robin Copeland, Dominic Ryan and Dave Foley made their international debuts for Ireland.
- Lasha Malaghuradze earned his 50th test cap for Georgia.

=== 21/22/23 November ===
21 November 2014
19:00 CET (UTC+1)

Fiji	20–14	United States
Try: Nagusa 26' c Votu (2) 29' m, 49' m Con: Nadolo (1/3) 27'; Pen: Nadolo (1/1) 10'	Report	Try: Kelly 41' c Ngwenya 58' c Con: McLean (2/2) 42', 58'

Stade de la Rabine, Vannes, France
Referee: John Lacey (Ireland)

Team details

FB	15	Timoci Nagusa		31' to 40'
RW	14	Watisoni Votu	(yellow card) 67' to 77'
OC	13	Vereniki Goneva
IC	12	Nemani Nadolo		(substituted off) 73'
LW	11	Asaeli Tikoirotuma
FH	10	Josh Matavesi
SH	9	Henry Seniloli		(substituted off) 78'
N8	8	Masi Matadigo		(substituted off) 40'	(substituted on) 48'	(substituted off) 57'
OF	7	Malakai Ravulo
BF	6	Akapusi Qera (c)
RL	5	Tevita Cavubati		(substituted off) 71'
LL	4	Leone Nakarawa
TP	3	Manasa Saulo		(substituted off) 64'
HK	2	Talemaitoga Tuapati	(yellow card) 40' to 50'			(substituted off) 64'
LP	1	Peni Ravai		(substituted off) 78'
Replacements:
HK	16	Sunia Koto		(substituted on) 40'	(substituted off) 48'	(substituted on) 64'
PR	17	Isei Colati		(substituted on) 78'
PR	18	Taniela Koroi		(substituted on) 64'
LK	19	Nemia Soqeta		(substituted on) 71'
FL	20	Dominiko Waqaniburotu				(substituted on) 57'
SH	21	Nemia Kenatale		(substituted on) 78'
FH	22	Jonetani Ralulu		(substituted on) 31'	(substituted off) 40'
WG	23	Waisea Nayacalevu		(substituted on) 73'
Coach:
(New Zealand) John McKee

FB	15	Ronnie McLean
RW	14	Takudzwa Ngwenya
OC	13	Seamus Kelly
IC	12	Thretton Palamo
LW	11	Tim Stanfill
FH	10	Shalom Suniula
SH	9	Mike Petri
N8	8	Todd Clever (c)	(substituted off) 48'
OF	7	John Quill	39' to 40'
BF	6	Scott LaValla
RL	5	Greg Peterson
LL	4	John Cullen	(substituted off) 78'
TP	3	Mate Moeakiola
HK	2	Phil Thiel
LP	1	Olive Kilifi	(substituted off) 59'
Replacements:
HK	16	Tom Coolican
PR	17	Nicholas Wallace	(substituted on) 59'
PR	18	Benjamin Tarr
FL	19	Matt Trouville	(substituted on) 48'
FL	20	Kyle Sumsion	(substituted on) 39'	(substituted off) 40'
CE	21	Roland Suniula
LK	22	Louis Stanfill	(substituted on) 78'
WG	23	Tim Maupin
Coach:
(United States) Mike Tolkin

Touch judges:
Peter Fitzgibbon (Ireland)
Gary Conway (Ireland)
Television match official:
Iain Ramage (Scotland)

Notes:

- Taniela Koroi made his international debut for Fiji.
- Ronnie McLean made his international debut for the United States.

22 November 2014
15:00 CET (UTC+1)

Italy	6–22	South Africa
Pen: Haimona (2/4) 11', 40'	Report	Try: Oosthuizen 21' m Reinach 58'; Habana 79' c Con: Pollard (2/2) 59', 80'; Pen: Lambie (1/1) 15'

Stadio Euganeo, Padua
Attendance: 24,500
Referee: Jérôme Garcès (France)

Team details

FB	15	Andrea Masi
RW	14	Leonardo Sarto	(substituted off) 78'
OC	13	Michele Campagnaro
IC	12	Luca Morisi
LW	11	Luke McLean
FH	10	Kelly Haimona	(substituted off) 75'
SH	9	Edoardo Gori	(substituted off) 64'
N8	8	Sergio Parisse (c)
OF	7	Samuela Vunisa
BF	6	Alessandro Zanni	(substituted off) 40'
RL	5	Joshua Furno	(substituted off) 70'
LL	4	Quintin Geldenhuys
TP	3	Martin Castrogiovanni	(substituted off) 63'
HK	2	Leonardo Ghiraldini	(substituted off) 63'
LP	1	Matías Agüero	(substituted off) 34'
Replacements:
HK	16	Andrea Manici	(substituted on) 63'
PR	17	Alberto De Marchi	(substituted on) 34'
PR	18	Dario Chistolini	(substituted on) 63'
LK	19	Marco Bortolami	(substituted on) 70'
FL	20	Francesco Minto	(substituted on) 40'
SH	21	Guglielmo Palazzani	(substituted on) 64'
FH	22	Luciano Orquera	(substituted on) 75'
WG	23	Giulio Toniolatti	(substituted on) 78'
Coach:
(France) Jacques Brunel

FB	15	Johan Goosen	(substituted off) 57'
RW	14	JP Pietersen
OC	13	Jan Serfontein
IC	12	Jean de Villiers (c)
LW	11	Bryan Habana
FH	10	Pat Lambie	(substituted off) 57'
SH	9	Cobus Reinach	(substituted off) 60'
N8	8	Duane Vermeulen
OF	7	Oupa Mohojé		(substituted off) 65'
BF	6	Marcell Coetzee	(substituted off) 56'	(substituted on) 65'
RL	5	Victor Matfield
LL	4	Eben Etzebeth	(substituted off) 70'
TP	3	Coenie Oosthuizen	(substituted off) 60'
HK	2	Adriaan Strauss	(substituted off) 50'
LP	1	Trevor Nyakane	(substituted off) 56'
Replacements:
HK	16	Bismarck du Plessis	(substituted on) 50'
PR	17	Gurthrö Steenkamp	(substituted on) 56'
PR	18	Julian Redelinghuys	(substituted on) 60'
LK	19	Lood de Jager	(substituted on) 70'
FL	20	Nizaam Carr	(substituted on) 56'
SH	21	Francois Hougaard	(substituted on) 60'
FH	22	Handré Pollard	(substituted on) 57'
FB	23	Willie le Roux	(substituted on) 57'
Coach:
(South Africa) Heyneke Meyer

Man of the Match:
Cobus Reinach (South Africa)

Touch judges:
Pascal Gaüzère (France)
Alexandre Ruiz (France)
Television match official:
Gareth Simmonds (Wales)

Notes:

- Samuela Vunisa made his international debut for Italy.
- Nizaam Carr and Julian Redelinghuys made their international debuts for South Africa.

22 November 2014
12:15 BRST (UTC-2)

Brazil	6–25	(Uruguay) Charrúas XV
Pen: Rodox (1/3) 26'; Drop: Di Pilla (1/1) 11'	Report	Try: Ardao (2) 13' m, 38' m Soto (2) 20' m, 48' m Silva 68' m

Estádio da Cidadania, Volta Redonda
Referee: Henrique Platais (Brazil)

Team details

FB	15	Guilherme Coghetto
RW	14	Rodolfo Sampaio Veiga
OC	13	Eduardo Melotto
IC	12	Pedro Henrique Lopes
LW	11	Jefferson Felisberto
FH	10	Pedro Di Pilla
SH	9	Beukes Cremer
N8	8	Nick Smith
OF	7	Michael Oliveira Lopes Moraes
BF	6	Diogo Paixao
RL	5	Lucas Piero de Moraes
LL	4	Pedro Rosa
TP	3	Jardel Vettorato
HK	2	Daniel Danielewicz (c)
LP	1	Jonatas Paulo
Replacements:
PR	16	Luan Diego Paduano
HK	17	Vitor Ancina de Oliveira
PR	18	Luiz Gustavo Lemes Vieira
LK	19	João Luiz da Ros
FL	20	Rafael Morales
SH	21	Bruno Silva
FH	22	Mateus Estrela Tavares
CE	23	Bruno Cardoso Carvalho
Coach:
(Argentina) Rodolfo Ambrosio

FB	15	Rodrigo Silva
RW	14	Juan Pablo Risso
OC	13	José Serrato
IC	12	Alberto Román
LW	11	Joaquin Pena
FH	10	Manuel Blengio
SH	9	Guillermo Lijtenstein
N8	8	Mathías Braun
OF	7	Matías Beer
BF	6	Diego Ardao
RL	5	Ignacio Dotti
LL	4	Gonzalo Soto
TP	3	Carlos Arboleya (c)
HK	2	Germán Kessler
LP	1	Rodolfo De Mula
Replacements:
HK	16	Facundo Gattas
PR	17	Mateo Sanguinetti
PR	18	Francisco Jimenez
LK	19	Jorge Zerbino
LK	20	Juan Manuel Etcheverry
SH	21	Leandro Segredo
FH	22	Facundo Klappenbach
CE	23	Santiago Arata
Coach:
(Uruguay) Pablo Lemoine

Man of the Match:
Diego Ardao (Uruguay)

Touch judges:
Marcel Santo (Brazil)
Braz Magaldi (Brazil)
Television match official:
Marcelo Toscano (Brazil)

22 November 2014
14:30 GMT (UTC+0)

Scotland	37–12	Tonga
Try: Cowan 14' c Hogg 32' c Dunbar 47' m Cross 67' c Seymour 75' m Con: Laidlaw (3/4) 15', 33', 67'; Pen: Laidlaw (2/2) 53', 64'	Report	Pen: Fosita (4/5) 9', 20', 22', 27'

Rugby Park, Kilmarnock
Attendance: 16,026
Referee: JP Doyle (England)

Team details

FB	15	Stuart Hogg
RW	14	Tommy Seymour
OC	13	Sean Lamont		(substituted off) 73'
IC	12	Alex Dunbar	(yellow card) 24' to 34'
LW	11	Tim Visser
FH	10	Finn Russell		(substituted off) 77'
SH	9	Greig Laidlaw (c)		(substituted off) 72'
N8	8	Johnnie Beattie		(substituted off) 64'
OF	7	Blair Cowan
BF	6	Rob Harley
RL	5	Jonny Gray
LL	4	Richie Gray		(substituted off) 73'
TP	3	Geoff Cross		(substituted off) 78'
HK	2	Ross Ford		(substituted off) 70'
LP	1	Alasdair Dickinson		(substituted off) 64'
Replacements:
HK	16	Fraser Brown		(substituted on) 70'
PR	17	Gordon Reid		(substituted on) 64'
PR	18	Ryan Grant		(substituted on) 78'
LK	19	Kieran Low		(substituted on) 73'
FL	20	Alasdair Strokosch		(substituted on) 64'
SH	21	Chris Cusiter		(substituted on) 72'
FH	22	Duncan Weir		(substituted on) 77'
CE	23	Duncan Taylor		(substituted on) 73'
Coach:
(New Zealand) Vern Cotter

FB	15	Vunga Lilo		(substituted off) 68'
RW	14	David Halaifonua
OC	13	Siale Piutau
IC	12	Hemani Paea
LW	11	Fetuʻu Vainikolo
FH	10	Latiume Fosita		(substituted off) 69'
SH	9	Sonatane Takulua		(substituted off) 69'
N8	8	Viliami Maʻafu		(substituted off) 64'
OF	7	Nili Latu (c)	(yellow card) 12' to 22'
BF	6	Sione Kalamafoni
RL	5	Joe Tuineau		(substituted off) 64'
LL	4	Tukulua Lokotui
TP	3	Paea Faʻanunu		(substituted off) 51'
HK	2	Aleki Lutui		(substituted off) 54'
LP	1	Tevita Mailau		(substituted off) 51'	(substituted on) 68'
Replacements:
HK	16	Elvis Taione		(substituted on) 54'
PR	17	Sione Lea		(substituted on) 51'	(substituted off) 68'
PR	18	Sila Puafisi		(substituted on) 51'
LK	19	Lisiate Faʻaoso		(substituted on) 64'
LK	20	Hale T-Pole		(substituted on) 64'
SH	21	Tomasi Palu		(substituted on) 69'
FH	22	Kurt Morath		(substituted on) 69'
CE	23	Sione Piukala		(substituted on) 68'
Coach:
(Tonga) Mana Otai

Man of the Match:
Blair Cowan (Scotland)

Touch judges:
Greg Garner (England)
Marius Mitrea (Italy)
Television match official:
Carlo Damasco (Italy)

22 November 2014
16:30 GMT (UTC+0)

Ireland	26–23	Australia
Try: Zebo 11' c Bowe 14' c Con: Sexton (2/2) 12', 15'; Pen: Sexton (4/5) 5', 40', 45', 63'	Report	Try: Phipps (2) 17' c, 30' m Foley 22' m Con: Foley (1/3) 18'; Pen: Foley (2/2) 36', 48'

Aviva Stadium, Dublin
Attendance: 51,100
Referee: Glen Jackson (New Zealand)

Team details

FB	15	Rob Kearney	(substituted off) 77'
RW	14	Tommy Bowe
OC	13	Robbie Henshaw
IC	12	Gordon D'Arcy	(substituted off) 58'
LW	11	Simon Zebo
FH	10	Johnny Sexton			(substituted off) 77'
SH	9	Conor Murray	(substituted off) 71'	(substituted on) 75'
N8	8	Jamie Heaslip
OF	7	Rhys Ruddock
BF	6	Peter O'Mahony
RL	5	Paul O'Connell (c)
LL	4	Devin Toner	(substituted off) 61'
TP	3	Mike Ross
HK	2	Rory Best	(substituted off) 67'
LP	1	Jack McGrath
Replacements:
HK	16	Seán Cronin	(substituted on) 67'
PR	17	Dave Kilcoyne
PR	18	Rodney Ah You
LK	19	Dave Foley	(substituted on) 61'
FL	20	Tommy O'Donnell
SH	21	Eoin Reddan	(substituted on) 71'	(substituted off) 75'	(substituted on) 77'
FH	22	Ian Madigan	(substituted on) 58'
FB	23	Felix Jones	(substituted on) 77'
Coach:
(New Zealand) Joe Schmidt

FB	15	Israel Folau
RW	14	Adam Ashley-Cooper
OC	13	Tevita Kuridrani	(substituted off) 45'
IC	12	Matt To'omua
LW	11	Henry Speight
FH	10	Bernard Foley	(substituted off) 64'
SH	9	Nick Phipps	(substituted off) 67'
N8	8	Ben McCalman
OF	7	Michael Hooper (c)
BF	6	Luke Jones	(substituted off) 53'
RL	5	Rob Simmons
LL	4	Sam Carter	(substituted off) 71'
TP	3	Sekope Kepu	(substituted off) 70'
HK	2	Saia Fainga'a	(substituted off) 70'
LP	1	James Slipper	(substituted off) 75'
Replacements:
HK	16	James Hanson	(substituted on) 70'
PR	17	Benn Robinson	(substituted on) 75'
PR	18	Tetera Faulkner	(substituted on) 70'
LK	19	Will Skelton	(substituted on) 71'
N8	20	Jake Schatz	(substituted on) 53'
SH	21	Will Genia	(substituted on) 67'
FH	22	Quade Cooper	(substituted on) 64'
FB	23	Kurtley Beale	(substituted on) 45'
Coach:
(Australia) Michael Cheika

Man of the Match:
Paul O'Connell (Ireland)

Touch judges:
Nigel Owens (Wales)
Mike Fraser (New Zealand)
Television match official:
Eric Gauzins (France)

Notes:

- Ireland reclaim the Lansdowne Cup for the first time since 2006.
- Henry Speight made his international debut for Australia.
- With this win, Ireland earn their first Autumn series clean-sweep, since their 2006 Autumn series campaign.

22 November 2014
16:30 WET (UTC+0)

Portugal	29–20	Namibia
Try: Lima 11' c Almeida 38' m Ávila (2) 43' c, 70' c Con: Girão (3/4) 12', 44', 72'; Pen: Girão (1/1) 52'	Report	Try: Van Jaarsveld 24' c Tromp 78' c Con: Kotzé (2/2) 26', 79'; Pen: Kotzé (2/3) 5', 20'

Estádio Universitário de Lisboa, Lisbon
Referee: Federico Anselmi (Argentina)

Team details

FB	15	Pedro Bettencourt Ávila
RW	14	Tomás Appleton
OC	13	Manuel Vilela Pereira
IC	12	José Lima
LW	11	Gonçalo Foro
FH	10	Nuno Penha e Costa
SH	9	Francisco Pinto Magalhães
N8	8	Tiago Girão
OF	7	Vasco Uva (c)
BF	6	Rafael Simões
RL	5	Gonçalo Uva
LL	4	Fernando Almeida
TP	3	Bruno Rocha
HK	2	Nuno Taful
LP	1	Bruno Medeiros
Replacements:
PR	16	Jorge Segurado
HK	17	Vasco Marques
PR	18	Francisco Domingues
LK	19	Salvador Vassalo
FL	20	Francisco de Sousa
SH	21	Maxime Tonietta
FH	22	Rodrigo Figueiredo
CE	23	Manuel Murteira
Coach:
(Portugal) João Luís Pinto

FB	15	Danie Dames
RW	14	David Philander
OC	13	Johan Deysel
IC	12	Darryl de la Harpe
LW	11	Johann Tromp
FH	10	Theuns Kotzé
SH	9	Ryan de la Harpe
N8	8	PJ van Lill
OF	7	Thomasau Forbes
BF	6	Rohan Kitshoff (c)
RL	5	Tjiuee Uanivi
LL	4	Morné Blom
TP	3	Casper Viviers
HK	2	Torsten van Jaarsveld
LP	1	Franklin Bertolini
Replacements:
HK	16	Rathony Becker
PR	17	Shaun du Preez
PR	18	Quintin Esterhuyzen
LK	19	DG Wiese
LK	20	Stefan Neustädt
SH	21	Eniell Buitendag
FH	22	Shaun Kaizemi
CE	23	JC Greyling
Coach:
(Namibia) Danie Vermeulen

Touch judges:
Giuseppe Vivarini (Italy)
Vlad Iordachescu (Romania)

22 November 2014
18:30 EET (UTC+2)

Romania	18–9	Canada
Pen: Vlaicu (6/7) 28', 37', 50', 54', 60', 73'	Report	Pen: Pritchard (2/3) 5', 57'; McRorie (1/2) 47'

Stadionul Arcul de Triumf, Bucharest
Referee: Nick Briant (New Zealand)

Team details

FB	15	Cătălin Fercu
RW	14	Dorin Manole
OC	13	Csaba Gál	(substituted off) 11'
IC	12	Catalin Dascălu
LW	11	Ionuț Botezatu
FH	10	Florin Vlaicu
SH	9	Valentin Calafeteanu	(substituted off) 78'
N8	8	Stelian Burcea
OF	7	Valentin Ursache
BF	6	Mihai Macovei (c)	51' to 60'
RL	5	Valentin Popârlan
LL	4	Alin Coste	(substituted off) 69'
TP	3	Horaţiu Pungea	(substituted off) 60'
HK	2	Otar Turashvili	(substituted off) 62'
LP	1	Mihai Lazăr	(substituted off) 69'
Replacements:
HK	16	Andrei Rădoi	(substituted on) 62'
PR	17	Andrei Ursache	(substituted on) 69'
PR	18	Paulică Ion	(substituted on) 60'
LK	19	Marius Antonescu	(substituted on) 69'
N8	20	Vlad Nistor	(substituted on) 51'	(substituted off) 60'
SH	21	Florin Surugiu	(substituted on) 78'
WG	22	Florin Ioniță	(substituted on) 11'
WG	23	Robert Neagu
Coach:
(Wales) Lynn Howells

FB	15	James Pritchard
RW	14	Jeff Hassler	(substituted off) 78'
OC	13	Conor Trainor
IC	12	Ciaran Hearn
LW	11	D. T. H. van der Merwe
FH	10	Pat Parfrey	(substituted off) 65'
SH	9	Gordon McRorie	(substituted off) 76'
N8	8	Tyler Ardron (c)	(substituted off) 40'
OF	7	Nanyak Dala	(substituted off) 62'
BF	6	Jebb Sinclair
RL	5	Jon Phelan
LL	4	Jamie Cudmore
TP	3	Jason Marshall	(substituted off) 40'
HK	2	Aaron Carpenter	(substituted off) 45'
LP	1	Hubert Buydens
Replacements:
HK	16	Ray Barkwill	(substituted on) 45'
PR	17	Andrew Tiedemann	(substituted on) 40'
PR	18	Doug Wooldridge		(substituted on) 73'
FL	19	Kyle Gilmour	(substituted on) 62'
N8	20	Richard Thorpe	(substituted on) 40'	(substituted off) 73'
SH	21	Sean White	(substituted on) 65'
FB	22	Jordan Wilson-Ross	(substituted on) 76'
CE	23	Nick Blevins	(substituted on) 78'
Coach:
(New Zealand) Kieran Crowley

Touch judges:
Andrew McMenemy (Scotland)
Lloyd Linton (Scotland)
Television match official:
Geoff Warren (England)

22 November 2014
17:30 GMT (UTC+0)

Wales	16–34	New Zealand
Try: Webb 45' c Con: Halfpenny (1/1) 45'; Pen: Halfpenny (3/3) 6', 51', 67'	Report	Try: Savea 42' c Kaino 63' m Barrett (2) 69' c, 76' m Read 72' c Con: Barrett (1/2) 43'; Slade (2/3) 70', 73'; Pen: Barrett (1/2) 22'

Millennium Stadium, Cardiff
Attendance: 72,000
Referee: Wayne Barnes (England)

Team details

FB	15	Leigh Halfpenny
RW	14	Alex Cuthbert
OC	13	Jonathan Davies
IC	12	Jamie Roberts
LW	11	George North	(substituted off) 65'
FH	10	Dan Biggar	(substituted off) 73'
SH	9	Rhys Webb	(substituted off) 56'
N8	8	Taulupe Faletau
OF	7	Sam Warburton (c)
BF	6	Dan Lydiate	(substituted off) 61'
RL	5	Alun Wyn Jones
LL	4	Jake Ball	(substituted off) 61'
TP	3	Samson Lee	(substituted off) 73'
HK	2	Richard Hibbard	(substituted off) 61'
LP	1	Paul James	(substituted off) 73'	(substituted on) 76'
Replacements:
HK	16	Scott Baldwin	(substituted on) 61'
PR	17	Nicky Smith	(substituted on) 73'	(substituted off) 76'
PR	18	Rhodri Jones	(substituted on) 73'
LK	19	Luke Charteris	(substituted on) 61'
FL	20	Justin Tipuric	(substituted on) 61'
SH	21	Mike Phillips	(substituted on) 56'
FH	22	James Hook	(substituted on) 73'
FB	23	Liam Williams	(substituted on) 65'
Coach:
(New Zealand) Warren Gatland

FB	15	Ben Smith
RW	14	Charles Piutau	(substituted off) 55'
OC	13	Conrad Smith
IC	12	Sonny Bill Williams	(substituted off) 70'
LW	11	Julian Savea
FH	10	Beauden Barrett
SH	9	Aaron Smith	(substituted off) 72'
N8	8	Kieran Read
OF	7	Richie McCaw (c)
BF	6	Jerome Kaino	(substituted off) 64'
RL	5	Sam Whitelock	(substituted off) 64'
LL	4	Brodie Retallick
TP	3	Owen Franks	(substituted off) 46'
HK	2	Dane Coles	(substituted off) 64'
LP	1	Wyatt Crockett	(substituted off) 40'
Replacements:
HK	16	Keven Mealamu	(substituted on) 64'
PR	17	Joe Moody	(substituted on) 40'
PR	18	Charlie Faumuina	(substituted on) 46'
LK	19	Patrick Tuipulotu	(substituted on) 64'
FL	20	Liam Messam	(substituted on) 64'
SH	21	TJ Perenara	(substituted on) 72'
FH	22	Colin Slade	(substituted on) 55'
CE	23	Ryan Crotty	(substituted on) 70'
Coach:
(New Zealand) Steve Hansen

Man of the Match:
Jamie Roberts (Wales)

Touch judges:
Craig Joubert (South Africa)
Luke Pearce (England)
Television match official:
Graham Hughes (England)

Notes:

- Luke Charteris earned his 50th test cap for Wales.
- New Zealand Captain Richie McCaw, captained his side for the 100th time. Coincidentally his first match as captain, was against Wales at the Millennium Stadium during the 2004 end-of-year tests.
- Following this match, Brodie Retallick was named World Rugby Player of the Year, the sixth and third consecutive All Black to achieve the award, the All Blacks were named World Rugby Team of the Year for the eighth and fifth consecutive time, and Steve Hansen was named World Rugby Coach of the Year for the third consecutive year.

22 November 2014
19:00 GMT (UTC+0)

England	28–9	Samoa
Try: May (2) 19' c, 52' m Brown 45' c Con: Ford (2/3) 20', 46'; Pen: Ford (3/4) 17', 26', 41'	Report	Pen: T. Pisi (3/4) 3', 23', 49'

Twickenham, London
Attendance: 82,076
Referee: Jaco Peyper (South Africa)

Team details

FB	15	Mike Brown
RW	14	Anthony Watson
OC	13	Brad Barritt
IC	12	Owen Farrell	(substituted off) 64'
LW	11	Jonny May	8' to 17'		(substituted off) 60'
FH	10	George Ford
SH	9	Ben Youngs	(substituted off) 63'
N8	8	Ben Morgan
OF	7	Chris Robshaw (c)
BF	6	James Haskell	(substituted off) 67'
RL	5	Courtney Lawes	(substituted off) 53'
LL	4	Dave Attwood
TP	3	David Wilson	(substituted off) 58'
HK	2	Rob Webber	(substituted off) 70'
LP	1	Joe Marler	(substituted off) 58'
Replacements:
HK	16	Dylan Hartley	(substituted on) 70'
PR	17	Matt Mullan	(substituted on) 58'
PR	18	Kieran Brookes	(substituted on) 58'
LK	19	George Kruis	(substituted on) 53'
FL	20	Tom Wood	(substituted on) 67'
SH	21	Richard Wigglesworth	(substituted on) 63'
CE	22	Billy Twelvetrees	(substituted on) 64'
WG	23	Marland Yarde	(substituted on) 8'	(substituted off) 17'	(substituted on) 60'
Coach:
(England) Stuart Lancaster

FB	15	Ken Pisi
RW	14	Alapati Leiua
OC	13	Rey Lee-Lo
IC	12	Johnny Leota	(yellow card) 51' to 61'
LW	11	David Lemi (c)
FH	10	Tusi Pisi		(substituted off) 68'
SH	9	Kahn Fotuali'i
N8	8	Ofisa Treviranus
OF	7	Jack Lam		(substituted off) 55'
BF	6	Maurie Fa'asavalu
RL	5	Kane Thompson		(substituted off) 61'
LL	4	Filo Paulo		(substituted off) 51'
TP	3	Census Johnston		(substituted off) 55'
HK	2	Ti’i Paulo		(substituted off) 60'
LP	1	Sakaria Taulafo		(substituted off) 77'
Replacements:
HK	16	Manu Leiataua		(substituted on) 60'
PR	17	Viliamu Afatia		(substituted on) 77'
PR	18	Anthony Perenise		(substituted on) 55'
LK	19	Fa'atiga Lemalu		(substituted on) 61'
LK	20	Daniel Leo		(substituted on) 51'
N8	21	TJ Ioane		(substituted on) 55'
SH	22	Pete Cowley
FH	23	Michael Stanley		(substituted on) 68'
Coach:
(Samoa) Stephen Betham

Man of the Match:
Chris Robshaw (England)

Touch judges:
Mathieu Raynal (France)
Dudley Phillips (Ireland)
Television match official:
Simon McDowell (Ireland)

22 November 2014
21:00 CET (UTC+1)

France	13–18	Argentina
Try: Fofana 56' c Con: Lopez (1/1) 58'; Pen: Lopez (1/3) 36'; Kockott (1/2) 63'	Report	Pen: Sánchez (2/4) 1', 25'; Drop: Sánchez (3/3) 16', 29', 45'; Hernández (1/2) 27'

Stade de France, Saint-Denis
Attendance: 45,000
Referee: George Clancy (Ireland)

Team details

FB	15	Scott Spedding
RW	14	Yoann Huget
OC	13	Maxime Mermoz	(substituted off) 41'	(substituted on) 58'
IC	12	Wesley Fofana
LW	11	Maxime Médard		(substituted off) 58'
FH	10	Camille Lopez	(substituted off) 69'
SH	9	Sébastien Tillous-Borde	(substituted off) 46'
N8	8	Damien Chouly	(substituted off) 74'
OF	7	Bernard Le Roux
BF	6	Thierry Dusautoir (c)
RL	5	Sébastien Vahaamahina	(substituted off) 48'
LL	4	Pascal Papé
TP	3	Nicolas Mas	(substituted off) 41'
HK	2	Benjamin Kayser	(substituted off) 46'
LP	1	Xavier Chiocci	(substituted off) 37'
Replacements:
HK	16	Guilhem Guirado	(substituted on) 46'
PR	17	Alexandre Menini	(substituted on) 37'
PR	18	Uini Atonio	(substituted on) 41'
LK	19	Yoann Maestri	(substituted on) 48'
N8	20	Charles Ollivon	(substituted on) 74'
SH	21	Rory Kockott	(substituted on) 46'
FH	22	Rémi Talès	(substituted on) 69'
CE	23	Mathieu Bastareaud	(substituted on) 41'
Coach:
(France) Philippe Saint-André

FB	15	Joaquín Tuculet	(substituted off) 61'
RW	14	Juan Imhoff
OC	13	Marcelo Bosch	(substituted off) 16'
IC	12	Juan Martín Hernández
LW	11	Manuel Montero
FH	10	Nicolás Sánchez
SH	9	Tomás Cubelli	(substituted off) 61'
N8	8	Leonardo Senatore	(substituted off) 19'
OF	7	Javier Ortega Desio
BF	6	Facundo Isa
RL	5	Tomás Lavanini
LL	4	Guido Petti	(substituted off) 75'
TP	3	Nahuel Tetaz Chaparro	(substituted off) 57'
HK	2	Agustín Creevy (c)
LP	1	Marcos Ayerza	(substituted off) 64'
Replacements:
HK	16	Matías Cortese
PR	17	Lucas Noguera Paz	(substituted on) 64'
PR	18	Ramiro Herrera	(substituted on) 57'
LK	19	Lucas Ponce	(substituted on) 75'
FL	20	Tomás Lezana	(substituted on) 19'
SH	21	Martín Landajo	(substituted on) 61'
FH	22	Santiago González Iglesias	(substituted on) 16'
WG	23	Lucas González Amorosino	(substituted on) 61'
Coach:
(Argentina) Daniel Hourcade

Touch judges:
Steve Walsh (Australia)
Stuart Berry (South Africa)
Television match official:
Jim Yuille (Scotland)

Notes:

- Tomás Lezana made his international debut for Argentina.
- Argentina beat France for the first time on French Soil, since their 34–10 win during the 2007 Rugby World Cup third-place match.

23 November 2014
17:00 GET (UTC+4)

Georgia	35–24	Japan
Try: Mamukashvili 12' m Penalty try 22' c Kvirikashvili 38' m Khmaladze 53' m Tsiklauri 75' c Con: Kvirikashvili (2/5) 26', 76'; Pen: Kvirikashvili (2/2) 52', 72'	Report	Try: Hesketh (2) 29' c, 67' c Tatekawa 78' c Con: Goromaru (3/3) 34', 68', 79'; Pen: Goromaru (1/1) 27'

Mikheil Meskhi Stadium, Tbilisi
Referee: Romain Poite (France)

Team details

FB	15	Merab Kvirikashvili
RW	14	Tamaz Mchedlidze
OC	13	Davit Kacharava (c)	(substituted off) 2'
IC	12	Merab Sharikadze	(substituted off) 73'
LW	11	Sandro Todua
FH	10	Lasha Khmaladze
SH	9	Vazha Khutsishvili
N8	8	Lasha Lomidze
OF	7	Viktor Kolelishvili
BF	6	Giorgi Tkhilaishvili	42' to 53'		(substituted off) 65'
RL	5	Levan Datunashvili
LL	4	Giorgi Nemsadze	(substituted off) 55'
TP	3	Davit Kubriashvili	(substituted off) 55'
HK	2	Shalva Mamukashvili	(substituted off) 62'
LP	1	Mikheil Nariashvili	(substituted off) 62'
Replacements:
HK	16	Simon Maisuradze	(substituted on) 62'
PR	17	Zurab Zhvania	(substituted on) 62'
PR	18	Levan Chilachava	(substituted on) 55'
LK	19	Konstantin Mikautadze	(substituted on) 55'
FL	20	Giorgi Chkhaidze	(substituted on) 42'	(substituted off) 53'	(substituted on) 65'
SH	21	Giorgi Begadze	(substituted on) 73'
FB	22	Beka Tsiklauri		(substituted on) 56'
CE	23	Giorgi Aptsiauri	(substituted on) 2'	(substituted off) 56'
Coach:
(New Zealand) Milton Haig

FB	15	Ayumu Goromaru
RW	14	Kotaro Matsushima		(substituted off) 77'
OC	13	Male Sa'u
IC	12	Harumichi Tatekawa
LW	11	Karne Hesketh
FH	10	Yuu Tamura		(substituted off) 53'
SH	9	Atsushi Hiwasa		(substituted off) 70'
N8	8	Amanaki Mafi
OF	7	Hayden Hopgood		(substituted off) 62'
BF	6	Hendrik Tui
RL	5	Shoji Ito		(substituted off) 50'
LL	4	Luke Thompson	(yellow card) 20' to 30'
TP	3	Kensuke Hatakeyama (c)		(substituted off) 62'
HK	2	Takeshi Kizu		(substituted off) 61'
LP	1	Masataka Mikami		(substituted off) 61'
Replacements:
PR	16	Keita Inagaki	(yellow card) 71' to 80'	(substituted on) 61'
HK	17	Hiroki Yuhara		(substituted on) 62'
PR	18	Shinnosuke Kakinaga		(substituted on) 61'
LK	19	Hitoshi Ono		(substituted on) 62'
LK	20	Shinya Makabe		(substituted on) 50'
SH	21	Yuki Yatomi		(substituted on) 70'
FH	22	Kosei Ono		(substituted on) 53'
WG	23	Toshiaki Hirose		(substituted on) 77'
Coach:
(Australia) Eddie Jones

Touch judges:
Ian Davies (Wales)
FFR Appointmen (France)
Television match official:
Stefano Pennè (Italy)

Notes:

- Giorgi Aptsiauri made his international debut for Georgia.
- This was Georgia's first win over Japan, bar in their second game.

=== 29 November ===
29 November 2014
12:00 BRST (UTC-2)

Brazil	21–13	Paraguay
	Report

Estádio Martins Pereira, São José dos Campos
Referee: Joaquín Montes (Uruguay)

29 November 2014
14:30 GMT (UTC+0)

England	26–17	Australia
Try: Morgan (2) 28' c, 56' c Con: Ford (2/2) 29', 57'; Pen: Ford (4/6) 6', 12', 63', 76'	Report	Try: Foley 44' c Skelton 59' c Con: Foley (1/1) 45'; Cooper (1/1) 60'; Pen: Foley (1/1) 3'

Twickenham, London
Attendance: 82,044
Referee: Jérôme Garcès (France)

Team details

FB	15	Mike Brown
RW	14	Anthony Watson
OC	13	Brad Barritt	61' to 67'		(substituted off) 78'
IC	12	Billy Twelvetrees		(substituted off) 67'
LW	11	Jonny May
FH	10	George Ford
SH	9	Ben Youngs	(substituted off) 69'
N8	8	Ben Morgan
OF	7	Chris Robshaw (c)
BF	6	Tom Wood	(substituted off) 77'	(substituted on) 78'
RL	5	Courtney Lawes	(substituted off) 53'
LL	4	Dave Attwood
TP	3	David Wilson	(substituted off) 60'
HK	2	Dylan Hartley	(substituted off) 71'
LP	1	Joe Marler	(substituted off) 53'
Replacements:
HK	16	Rob Webber	(substituted on) 71'
PR	17	Matt Mullan	(substituted on) 53'
PR	18	Kieran Brookes	(substituted on) 60'
LK	19	George Kruis	(substituted on) 53'	(substituted off) 78'
FL	20	James Haskell	(substituted on) 77'
SH	21	Richard Wigglesworth	(substituted on) 69'
FH	22	Owen Farrell	(substituted on) 61'
WG	23	Marland Yarde			(substituted on) 78'
Coach:
(England) Stuart Lancaster

FB	15	Israel Folau
RW	14	Henry Speight	(substituted off) 63'
OC	13	Adam Ashley-Cooper
IC	12	Matt To'omua
LW	11	Rob Horne
FH	10	Bernard Foley	(substituted off) 45'
SH	9	Nick Phipps	(substituted off) 49'
N8	8	Ben McCalman
OF	7	Michael Hooper (c)
BF	6	Sean McMahon	(substituted off) 58'
RL	5	Rob Simmons	(substituted off) 40'
LL	4	Sam Carter
TP	3	Sekope Kepu	(substituted off) 51'
HK	2	Saia Fainga'a	(substituted off) 72'
LP	1	James Slipper	(substituted off) 67'
Replacements:
HK	16	James Hanson	(substituted on) 72'
PR	17	Benn Robinson	(substituted on) 67'
PR	18	Ben Alexander	(substituted on) 51'
LK	19	Will Skelton	(substituted on) 58'
FL	20	Luke Jones	(substituted on) 40'
SH	21	Nic White	(substituted on) 49'
FH	22	Quade Cooper	(substituted on) 45'
FB	23	Kurtley Beale	(substituted on) 63'
Coach:
(Australia) Michael Cheika

Man of the Match:
Ben Morgan (England)

Touch judges:
Nigel Owens (Wales)
Mathieu Raynal (France)
Television match official:
Simon McDowell (Ireland)

Notes:

- Rob Simmons earned his 50th test cap for Australia.
- England retained the Cook Cup.

29 November 2014
14:30 GMT (UTC+0)

Wales	12–6	South Africa
Pen: Halfpenny (4/5) 3', 47', 52', 56'	Report	Pen: Lambie (2/3) 9', 50'

Millennium Stadium, Cardiff
Attendance: 58,225
Referee: John Lacey (Ireland)

Team details

FB	15	Leigh Halfpenny	(substituted off) 64'
RW	14	Alex Cuthbert
OC	13	Jonathan Davies
IC	12	Jamie Roberts
LW	11	Liam Williams
FH	10	Dan Biggar
SH	9	Rhys Webb
N8	8	Taulupe Faletau
OF	7	Sam Warburton (c)
BF	6	Dan Lydiate
RL	5	Alun Wyn Jones
LL	4	Jake Ball
TP	3	Samson Lee
HK	2	Scott Baldwin
LP	1	Gethin Jenkins	(substituted off) 74'
Replacements:
HK	16	Emyr Phillips
PR	17	Aaron Jarvis	(substituted on) 74'
PR	18	Rhodri Jones
LK	19	Luke Charteris
FL	20	James King
SH	21	Mike Phillips
FH	22	Rhys Priestland
CE	23	Scott Williams	(substituted on) 64'
Coach:
(New Zealand) Warren Gatland

FB	15	Willie le Roux
RW	14	Cornal Hendricks	(yellow card) 62' to 72'
OC	13	Jan Serfontein
IC	12	Jean de Villiers (c)		(substituted off) 57'
LW	11	Lwazi Mvovo
FH	10	Pat Lambie		(substituted off) 56'
SH	9	Cobus Reinach		(substituted off) 61'
N8	8	Duane Vermeulen
OF	7	Oupa Mohojé		(substituted off) 53'
BF	6	Marcell Coetzee
RL	5	Victor Matfield
LL	4	Eben Etzebeth		(substituted off) 68'
TP	3	Coenie Oosthuizen		(substituted off) 69'
HK	2	Bismarck du Plessis		(substituted off) 56'
LP	1	Tendai Mtawarira		(substituted off) 53'
Replacements:
HK	16	Adriaan Strauss		(substituted on) 56'
PR	17	Trevor Nyakane		(substituted on) 53'
PR	18	Julian Redelinghuys		(substituted on) 69'
LK	19	Lood de Jager		(substituted on) 68'
FL	20	Nizaam Carr		(substituted on) 53'
SH	21	Francois Hougaard		(substituted on) 61'
FH	22	Handré Pollard		(substituted on) 56'
CE	23	Damian de Allende		(substituted on) 57'
Coach:
(South Africa) Heyneke Meyer

Man of the Match:
Dan Biggar (Wales)

Touch judges:
George Clancy (Ireland)
Pascal Gaüzère (France)
Television match official:
Graham Hughes (England)

Notes:

- Wales win the Prince William Cup for the first ever time since its creation in 2007.
- Wales beat South Africa for the first time since 1999, and for just the second time.
- Wales beat a Southern hemisphere great (Australia, New Zealand, South Africa) for the first time since 2008, ending a 22 match losing streak.

== See also ==
- End of year rugby union tests
- Mid-year rugby union tests
- 2014 mid-year rugby union tests
- 2014 Māori All Blacks tour of Japan
