= Robert Neagu =

Romania international rugby union player

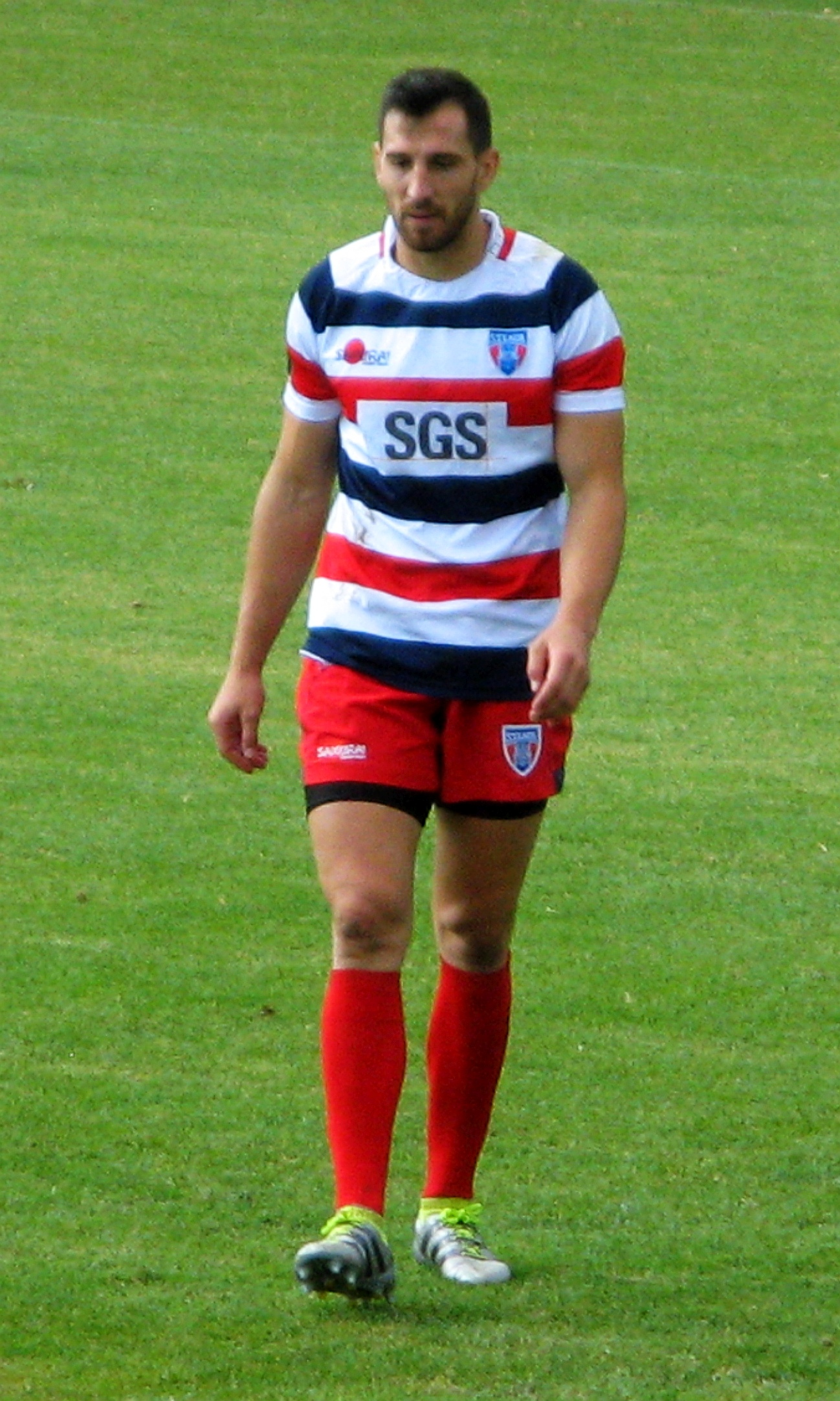
- Robert Neagu playing for Steaua in 2017
- Full name: Robert Gabriel Neagu
- Born: 20 July 1991 (age 35) Bârlad, Romania
- Height: 1.86 m (6 ft 1 in)
- Weight: 86 kg (13 st 8 lb; 190 lb)

Rugby union career
- Position(s): Wing, fullback
- Current team: Steaua
Senior career
Years	Team	Apps	(Points)
- Politehnica Iași
?–2015	Farul Constanța		
2015–	Steaua București	13	(40)
- Correct as of 15 September 2017
Provincial / State sides
Years	Team	Apps	(Points)
2014–15	București Wolves	5	(0)
- Correct as of 23 September 2017
International career
Years	Team	Apps	(Points)
2014–	Romania	2	(0)
- Correct as of 23 September 2017

Robert Gabriel Neagu (born 20 July 1991) is a Romanian rugby union football player. He plays mostly as a wing for professional SuperLiga club Steaua București but he can also play as a fullback. He also plays for Romania's national team, the Oaks, making his international debut during the second week of the 2014 end-of-year rugby union internationals in a match against the American Eagles.

== Career ==
Before joining Steaua București, Robert Neagu played for Farul Constanța and Politehnica Iași.
