= John Cullen (rugby union) =

American rugby union athlete

- Born: May 16, 1990 (age 36) La Mirada, California, U.S.
- Height: 1.95 m (6 ft 5 in)
- Weight: 118 kg (260 lb; 18 st 8 lb)

Rugby union career
- Position(s): Lock, No. 8
Amateur team(s)
Years	Team	Apps	(Points)
2011–2013	University of Utah		
2013–present	Seattle Saracens Des Moines Rugby Club		
Senior career
Years	Team	Apps	(Points)
2018–2020	Utah Warriors	26	(10)
2023–	Chicago Hounds	1	(0)
- Correct as of 19 April 2023
International career
Years	Team	Apps	(Points)
2014	United States	3	(0)
- Correct as of November 23, 2014

John Cullen (born May 16, 1990 in La Mirada, California) is an American rugby union athlete who plays for the Chicago Hounds in Major League Rugby (MLR).

He previously played for the Utah Warriors in the MLR and the United States national rugby union team as a lock.

He currently coaches alongside fellow USA Eagle Tim Maupin at Des Moines Rugby Club. Located in West Des Moines, Iowa, both John and Tim are working to turn the club into an MLR academy team. In recent years, the club has made great strides and are on the come up.

John was selected to tour with the USA Selects for the 2013 and 2014 Americas Rugby Championship, and most recently for the 2014 End of Year Tour of Europe. His debut with the Eagles was in November 2014 against Romania, and he earned his first starting cap against Tonga. He was called in to train at the Summer 2014 High-Performance Camp with the Men's Eagles Sevens team.

== Club ==
Cullen initially played his club rugby with Seattle Saracens, winners of the Okanagan Spring Brewery League as well as the inaugural Elite City Sevens Tournament. He was named to the All-Tournament Team for the 2014 Elite City Sevens Tournament and scored four tries in the 2014 World Club 7s Tournament at Twickenham Stadium as Seattle won the Shield.

== College ==
Cullen was a USA Rugby Collegiate All American at Utah and toured New Zealand with the 2013 Men's Collegiate All-Americans. Before transitioning to rugby, Cullen was a second-team all-Pac-12 conference left tackle who started 24 games in two seasons for Utah.
