= Lucas Ponce =

Argentine rugby union player (born 1990)

- Full name: Lucas Ponce
- Born: 3 September 1990 (age 36) Buenos Aires, Argentina
- Height: 1.98 m (6 ft 6 in)
- Weight: 113 kg (17 st 11 lb; 249 lb)

Rugby union career
- Position: Loose Forward
- Current team: CUBA
Senior career
Years	Team	Apps	(Points)
2010−	CUBA	44	(10)
2014−	Pampas XV	6	(0)
- Correct as of 1 December 2014
International career
Years	Team	Apps	(Points)
2009	Argentina Under-19	1	(0)
2010	Argentina Under-20	6	(0)
2010−14	Argentina Jaguars	6	(5)
2014–	Argentina	5	(5)
- Correct as of 1 December 2014

Lucas Ponce (born 3 September 1990) is an Argentine rugby union footballer who plays as a loose forward for Club Universitario de Buenos Aires and the Argentina national rugby union team.

== Career ==
To date, Ponce has played his entire career in his homeland with the CUBA club in the Torneo de la URBA.

== International career ==
Ponce was a member of the Argentina Under-20 side which competed in the 2010 IRB Junior World Championship, he also represented the Argentina Jaguars team in 2010, 2012 and 2014 and played for the Pampas XV during their 2014 tour of Oceania.

He made his senior debut for Los Pumas on 17 May 2014 in a clash against South American rivals Uruguay, he then went on to earn his second cap the following week against Chile where he also scored his first international try. He wasn't named in the Pumas squads for either the 2014 mid-year rugby union internationals or the 2014 Rugby Championship, however he did find a place in the squad which travelled to Europe for the 2014 end-of-year rugby union internationals where he played a part in all 3 matches on the tour against Scotland, Italy and France.
