= Isei Colati =

Fijian rugby union player (born 1983)

- Born: Isei Colati Koliavu; 23 December 1983 (age 42) Suva, Fiji
- Height: 1.75 m (5 ft 9 in)
- Weight: 115 kg (254 lb; 18 st 2 lb)
- School: Gospel High School

Rugby union career
International career
Years	Team	Apps	(Points)
2014–2015	Fiji	9	(0)
- Correct as of 3 December 2020

Isei Colati (born 23 December 1983) is a Fijian rugby union player. He was named in Fiji's squad for the 2015 Rugby World Cup.
