= Tom McQueen =

Scottish footballer (1929–2015)

Personal information
- Date of birth: 21 February 1929
- Place of birth: West Calder, Scotland
- Date of death: 10 February 2015 (aged 85)
- Place of death: Kilmarnock, Scotland
- Position: Goalkeeper

Senior career*
| Years | Team | Apps | (Gls) |
| 1946–1947 | Motherwell | 0 | (0) |
| 1947–1948 | Leith Athletic | 8 | (0) |
| 1947–1948 | Alloa Athletic | 2 | (0) |
| 1948–1952 | Kilbirnie Ladeside | | |
| 1952–1953 | Hibernian | 3 | (0) |
| 1953–1954 | Queen of the South | 0 | (0) |
| 1954–1957 | Accrington Stanley | 80 | (0) |
| 1956–1957 | East Fife | 6 | (0) |
| 1957–1960 | Berwick Rangers | 72 | (0) |
| 1960–1961 | Stranraer | 6 | (0) |
- * Club domestic league appearances and goals

Thomas McQueen (21 February 1929 – 10 February 2015) was a Scottish footballer who played as a goalkeeper in both the Scottish and English Football Leagues. He was the father of former Scotland defender Gordon McQueen.

== Career ==
Raised in Kilbirnie, as a youth McQueen was signed for Motherwell by former Scotland international George Stevenson, who came from the same town. He made no first team appearances at the club and after short spells at Leith Athletic and Alloa Athletic, joined his local Junior side, Kilbirnie Ladeside. His four years at the club culminated in a victorious Scottish Junior Cup final appearance in 1952, with Ladeside defeating Camelon Juniors 1–0 in front of 69,959 supporters at Hampden Park (the Camelon side contained John Hansen, father of future Scotland internationalists Alan and John).

McQueen's success at that level earned him a move to reigning Scottish League champions Hibernian, but he was unable to dislodge incumbent goalkeeper Tommy Younger and made only three league appearances for the Edinburgh side. He moved on to Queen of the South in 1953 before joining the large Scots colony at Accrington Stanley under manager Walter Galbraith. McQueen made eighty appearances for Accrington and his renowned long kicking became a tactic in the club's most successful era. Returning to Scotland, McQueen played out his career with East Fife, Berwick Rangers and Stranraer.

After retiring, McQueen returned to his trade as a joiner while in his spare time, he was a successful breeder of Border canaries as well as being a member of The Salvation Army.

McQueen died 11 days before his 86th birthday at the University Hospital Crosshouse, Kilmarnock, East Ayrshire. He was survived by his three children, including former Scotland international and Leeds United defender Gordon, and Iain who is assistant secretary and treasurer of the Scottish Junior Football Association. He was also the grandfather of Sky Sports presenter Hayley McQueen.

== Honours ==
Kilburnie Laeside

- Scottish Junior Cup: 1951–52
- Western League: 1951–52

== See also ==
- List of Scottish football families
