= Ronnie McLean =

British-American rugby union player (born 1985)

- Full name: Ronald Martin McLean-Dents
- Born: June 5, 1985 (age 41) Burbank, CA, United States
- Height: 6 ft 0 in (183 cm)
- Weight: 205 lb (93 kg)

Rugby union career
- Position: Centre
International career
Years	Team	Apps	(Points)
2014	United States	1	(4)

Ronald Martin McLean-Dents (born June 5, 1985) is a British-American rugby union player.

McLean was born in Burbank, California and moved to Coventry, England, aged six. His grandfather was the renowned Coventry RFC prop Mike McLean and he played his early rugby for the same club to continue the family association. He crossed to West Midlands rival Birmingham & Solihull in 2009.

A centre, McLean received a call up to the United States national team in 2014, while playing his rugby for third-tier English club Ealing Trailfinders. He made his only capped appearance in a test match against Fiji in Vannes, France, which he played out of position as a fullback and kicked two conversions in a 14–20 loss.

== See also ==
- List of United States national rugby union players
