= Salvador Vassalo =

Portuguese rugby union player

Salvador Maria Louro Vassalo Santos (born 1 March 1993) is a Portuguese rugby union player who plays as a flanker.

He plays for Cascais Rugby since he was 7 years old, and joined the first category in 2011/12.

He has 27 caps for Portugal, with 6 tries scored, 30 points on aggregate. He had his debut at the 29-20 win over Namibia, at 22 November 2014, in Lisbon, in a tour, aged 21 years old, in a game where he played as a substitute. He was the captain of the "Lobos".
