= Sione Lea =

- Full name: Sione Ma'a Lea
- Born: 12 January 1987 (age 39) Vavaʻu, Tonga
- Height: 1.82 m (6 ft 0 in)
- Weight: 108 kg (17 st 0 lb; 238 lb)
- School: Wesley College

Rugby union career
- Position(s): Hooker, Prop
- Current team: Taranaki
Senior career
Years	Team	Apps	(Points)
2011–2017	Taranaki	52	(5)
- Correct as of 22 May 2018
International career
Years	Team	Apps	(Points)
2014–2017	Tonga	5	(0)
- Correct as of 22 May 2018

Sione Ma'a Lea (born 12 January 1987) was a Tongan rugby union player. He played in the prop and occasionally hooker position for the New Zealand based Mitre 10 Cup side, Taranaki. Lea also represented Tonga at international level.
