= Ryan de la Harpe =

Namibia international rugby union player

Ryan De La Harpe
- Full name: Ryan Clifton Alexander De La Harpe
- Born: 2 September 1982 (age 44) Walvis Bay, South West Africa
- Height: 1.70 m (5 ft 7 in)
- Weight: 88 kg (194 lb)
- School: Windhoek High School
- Occupation: Professional Rugby Coach

Rugby union career
- Position: Scrum-half
International career
Years	Team	Apps	(Points)
2011-2014	Namibia	9	(5)
- Correct as of 9 September 2019

Ryan Clifton Alexander De La Harpe (born 2 September 1982) is a former Namibian rugby union player who played as a scrum-half represented Namibia internationally from 2011 to 2014, including appearances at the 2011 Rugby World Cup, and becoming the first Namibian to play for the world famous Barbarians . He was among the most recognisable Namibian scrum-halves of the 2010s. In 2022, he was appointed National U20s Head Rugby Coach and Academy Manager for Namibia. Prior to this appointment, he served as Head Coach at Vagabonds RUFC on the Isle of Man for four years.

Since leaving the NRU, De La Harpe has resumed his professional coaching career in the United Kingdom. He holds a RFU Advanced Rugby Union Coaching Certificate and is a certified World Rugby Educator. He currently works in the Fylde region for AFC Fylde Foundation, supporting people in the community through sport, education, and outreach initiatives. In 2019, De La Harpe co-founded De La Sports on the Isle of Man with his wife, offering rugby coaching and development programs across the Isle of Man and the UK. He also creates rugby coaching content on his YouTube channel.

== Playing career ==
De La Harpe's rugby journey began in his home country of Namibia, where he represented the national side at under-16, under-17, and under-18 level. Although he initially played on the wing during his early career, he aspired to play scrum-half—a position he later made his own during his professional career.

Before moving to England in 2007, De La Harpe played in South Africa for Orange Free State and the Pumas. He was involved in the South Africa under-21 elite squad and participated in representative teams including the African Leopards, a pan-African invitational side, and the Jaguars.

After relocating to England, De La Harpe joined Letchworth Garden City RUFC, before moving north to play for West Park St Helens . His performances earned him selection for the Lancashire County Rugby Football Union representative side and a stint with the Sale Sharks Jets. He later played for Fylde Rugby Club and Birmingham Moseley Rugby Club, contributing to both league and cup campaigns.

De La Harpe made his international debut for Namibia against Romania on 10 June 2011 prior to the World Cup call. He was included in the Namibian squad for the 2011 Rugby World Cup following the successful outing with Birmingham Moseley and featured in three group stage matches.

In 2014, he notably became the first Namibian to play for the famous Barbarians.

== Coaching career ==
He retired from international rugby in 2014 and pursued his career through coaching professionally. He gained his RFU Level 2 Coaching Award in 2008 and the Advanced Coaching Award (formerly Level 3) in 2020. In 2023, he became a certified World Rugby Level 2 Educator, enabling him to deliver accredited coaching courses and support rugby development programs internationally. He had coaching stints with Myerscough College, Lancashire County Rugby Football Union, Lancaster University. In 2018, Lancaster University won the Roses varsity tournament against York University for the first time in ten years, with a record score of 225.5 to 126.5. The Men's Rugby 1sts sealed the victory with a dramatic 31–18 comeback win in the final fixture of the weekend. Ryan De La Harpe was the Head Coach during this period, contributing to the rugby program's development and success.

=== Vagabonds RFC (2018–2022) ===
In August 2018, Ryan De La Harpe was appointed Head of Rugby at Vagabonds RFC on the Isle of Man, taking responsibility for the men's, women's, and junior sections of the club.

In January 2020, under De La Harpe's leadership, Vagabonds RUFC secured a 34–31 win over Liverpool University Medics, earning a top-four finish and a place in the Lancashire/Cheshire Division Two promotion shoot-out—their first promotion contention in over 25 years. The season was later curtailed due to the COVID-19 pandemic, and Vagabonds were awarded promotion based on their standing at the time.

In 2022, Vagabonds Hornets (the club's second XV) reached the semi-finals of the Ravenscroft Manx Plate, securing a top-two finish and a home semi-final.

During his tenure, De La Harpe also expanded youth and women's rugby programs, strengthened community ties, and mentored emerging coaches and players across the Isle of Man.

=== Namibia U20 and Academy Role ===
Ryan De La Harpe served as Head Coach of Namibia's U20 team and Academy Manager under the Namibian Rugby Union (NRU) until 2024. During his tenure, he led grassroots initiatives aimed at expanding youth participation and improving coaching standards across the country.

In 2023, he created and organised the first Nam Tag Tournament at the High School he used to attend, Windhoek High School, involving over 250 children—both boys and girls—from schools including Elim, Gammams, Khomasdal, MH Greef, and St Andrews Primary. De La Harpe emphasized the importance of exposing children to competitive rugby and expressed his commitment to investing in the future of Namibian rugby.

In 2022, De La Harpe introduced Namibia's first formal alignment camps for the U20 national team, aimed at preparing players for international competition and standardizing coaching practices. He also introduced community outreach programs, including sessions in Khomasdal, where he was raised.

During the 2023 Rugby World Cup, De La Harpe appeared several times as a live television analyst, contributing expert commentary alongside presenters and guests. His analysis covered high-profile fixtures including the opening match between New Zealand and France, one of Namibia's group stage games, and the tournament final. His media work complemented his coaching role, offering broader insights into elite-level rugby and Tier 2 development.

His coaching philosophy centered on applying the professional standards and inclusive practices he developed in the UK to uplift rugby in Namibia. De La Harpe's coaching philosophy emphasizes inclusive, age-appropriate development and long-term progression, consistent with principles of Long-Term Athlete Development (LTAD). His grassroots work in Namibia and youth coaching in the UK reflect this approach.

== Current Work ==
In addition to his rugby coaching, since 2024, De La Harpe has worked with the AFC Fylde Foundation, supporting community engagement and sport development initiatives across Lancashire. He also continues to run De La Sports, offering rugby coaching and development programs in the UK.

In March 2025, De La Harpe was appointed Head Coach of Thornton Cleveleys RFC following the departure of the previous coach. Just two months later, on 18 May 2025, the club won the Papa John's Community Cup Counties 2 North Shield, defeating Birmingham and Solihull Bees 25–18 in the final at Castle Park, Doncaster. The victory marked a rapid turnaround for the club, which had fallen short in the previous year's campaign. It showcased De La Harpe's impact on team cohesion, match preparation, and grassroots development.
