= 2013 IRB Pacific Nations Cup =

Rugby union tournament

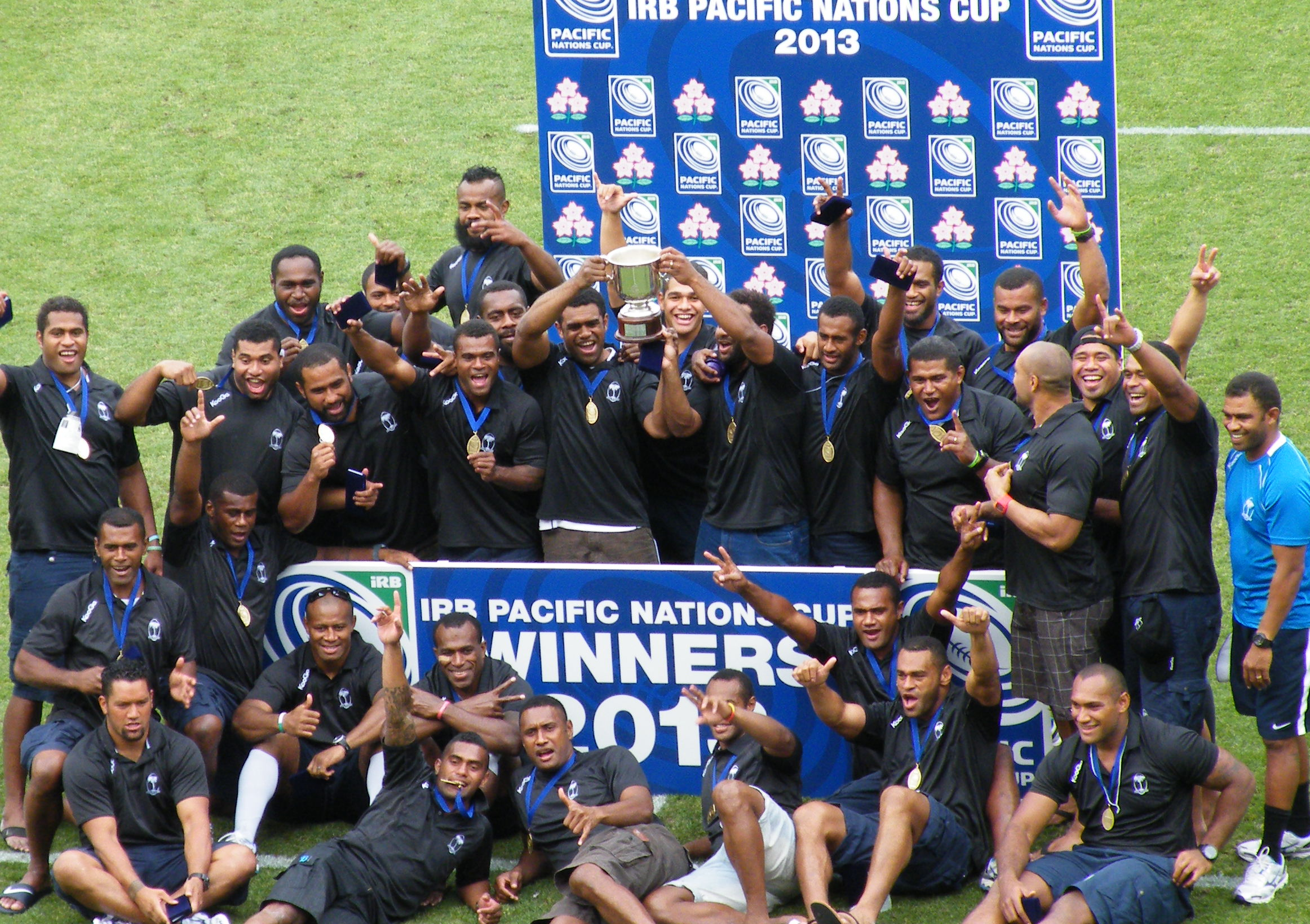

Tournament details
- Countries: Canada; Fiji; Japan; Tonga; United States
- Tournament format(s): Round-robin
- Date: 25 May – 23 June 2013

Tournament statistics
- Teams: 5
- Matches played: 10
- Attendance: 40,212 (4,021 per match)
- Tries scored: 49 (4.9 per match)
- Top point scorer(s): James Pritchard (Canada) (31 points)
- Top try scorer(s): Nemani Nadolo (Fiji); Fetuʻu Vainikolo (Tonga) (3 tries)

Final
- Champions: Fiji
- Runners-up: Canada

The 2013 Pacific Nations Cup rugby union tournament was held between five national sides in the Pacific Region: Canada, Fiji, Japan, Tonga, and USA.

Samoa were the reigning champion after they defeated Fiji in the 2012 competition but took the year off to compete in a tournament with South Africa, Scotland and Italy in the South African Quadrangular Tournament. Meanwhile, with the demise of the Churchill Cup, Canada and United States joined this competition for the first time.

The tournament ran from 25 May to 23 June 2013. Five of the matches were held in Japan, three in Canada, one in the U.S., and one in Fiji.

As with previous years, the tournament was a round-robin where each team played each of the other teams once. Four points were awarded for a win, two for a draw and none for a defeat. There were also bonus points offered with one bonus point for scoring four or more tries in a match and one bonus point for losing by 7 points or less.

== Table ==
	Team	Played	Won	Drawn	Lost	Points For	Points Against	Points Diff	Tries For	Tries Against	Try Bonus	Losing Bonus	Points
1	Fiji (13)	4	3	0	1	109	59	+50	14	7	3	1	16
2	Canada (14)	4	3	0	1	85	70	+15	8	7	0	1	13
3	Tonga (11)	4	2	0	2	93	96	-3	12	10	2	0	10
4	Japan (15)	4	2	0	2	79	82	-3	11	12	1	0	9
5	United States (16)	4	0	0	4	48	107	-59	4	13	0	1	1
Source : irb.com Points breakdown: *4 points for a win *2 points for a draw *1 bonus point for a loss by seven points or less *1 bonus point for scoring four or more tries in a match Pre-tournament rankings are in parentheses.

== Fixtures ==
=== Week 1 ===
25 May 2013
14:10 JST (UTC+9)

Japan	17–27	Tonga
Try: Kizu 21' m Sa'u 42' m Tui 62' c Con: Goromaru (1/3)	Report; IRB	Try: Vainikolo (2) 5' m, 13' c Helu 37' c Aholelei 45' m Con: Apikotoa (2/4); Pen: Apikotoa (1/2) 24'

Nippatsu Mitsuzawa Stadium, Kanagawa
Attendance: 5,598
Referee: Angus Gardner (Australia)

FB	15	Ayumu Goromaru
RW	14	Yoshikazu Fujita
OC	13	Male Sa'u
IC	12	Harumichi Tatekawa
LW	11	Hirotoki Onozawa	(substituted off) 60'
FH	10	Kosei Ono	(substituted off) 49'
SH	9	Atsushi Hiwasa
N8	8	Takashi Kikutani (c)
OF	7	Michael Broadhurst
BF	6	Hendrik Tui
RL	5	Shinya Makabe	(substituted off) 40'
LL	4	Hitoshi Ono
TP	3	Hiroshi Yamashita	(substituted off) 60'
HK	2	Takeshi Kizu	(substituted off) 60'
LP	1	Masataka Mikami
Replacements:
HK	16	Yusuke Aoki	(substituted in) 60'
PR	17	Takuma Asahara
PR	18	Kensuke Hatakeyama	(substituted in) 60'
LK	19	Shoji Ito	(substituted in) 40'
FL	20	Ryuta Yasui
SH	21	Keisuke Uchida
FH	22	Yuu Tamura	(substituted in) 49'
WG	23	Kenki Fukuoka	(substituted in) 60'
Coach:
(Australia) Eddie Jones

FB	15	David Halaifonua
RW	14	Fetuʻu Vainikolo
OC	13	Siale Piutau
IC	12	Sione Piukala
LW	11	William Helu
FH	10	Fangatapu Apikotoa		(substituted off) 47'
SH	9	Tomasi Palu		(substituted off) 49'
N8	8	Paula Kaho	(yellow card) 30' to 40'	(substituted off) 72'
OF	7	Nili Latu (c)
BF	6	Hale T-Pole
RL	5	Tukulua Lokotui
LL	4	Joshua Afu		(substituted off) 63'
TP	3	Taione Vea
HK	2	Elvis Taione		(substituted off) 72'
LP	1	Eddie Aholelei		(substituted off) 72'
Replacements:
HK	16	Ilaisa Maʻasi		(substituted in) 72'
PR	17	Kamaliele Sakalia		(substituted in) 72'
PR	18	Peni Fakalelu
LK	19	Samisone Masima		(substituted in) 63'
N8	20	Viliami Fihaki		(substituted in) 72'
SH	21	Taniela Moa		(substituted in) 49'
FH	22	Kurt Morath		(substituted in) 47'
WG	23	Viliame Iongi
Coach:
(Tonga) Mana Otai

Man of the Match:
Nili Latu (Tonga)

Touch judges:
(Australia) James Leckie
(Japan) Taizo Hirabayashi

25 May 2013
14:10 MDT (UTC-6)

Canada	16–9	United States
Try: Moonlight 17' c Con: Braid (1/1); Pen: Braid (3/4) 3', 67', 72'	Report; IRB	Pen: Siddall (3/4) 31', 48', 60'

Ellerslie Rugby Park, Edmonton
Attendance: 3,526
Referee: Francisco Pastrana (Argentina)

FB	15	Connor Braid
RW	14	Ciaran Hearn
OC	13	Nick Blevins
IC	12	Pat Parfrey	(substituted off) 67'
LW	11	Taylor Paris
FH	10	Harry Jones
SH	9	Sean White	(substituted off) 71'
N8	8	Aaron Carpenter (c)
OF	7	John Moonlight	(substituted off) 72'
BF	6	Tyler Ardron
RL	5	Tyler Hotson
LL	4	Brett Beukeboom	(substituted off) 53'
TP	3	Jason Marshall	(substituted off) 67'
HK	2	Ray Barkwill	(substituted off) 49'
LP	1	Hubert Buydens
Replacements:
HK	16	Ryan Hamilton	(substituted in) 49'
PR	17	Andrew Tiedemann	(substituted in) 67'
PR	18	Doug Wooldridge
LK	19	Jon Phelan	(substituted in) 53'
LK	20	Cameron Pierce
FL	21	Nanyak Dala	(substituted in) 72'
SH	22	Phil Mack	(substituted in) 71'
FB	23	Liam Underwood	(substituted in) 67'
Coach:
(New Zealand) Kieran Crowley

FB	15	Adam Siddall
RW	14	Luke Hume	(substituted off) 70'
OC	13	Troy Hall	(substituted off) 72'
IC	12	Andrew Suniula
LW	11	James Paterson
FH	10	Toby L'Estrange
SH	9	Robbie Shaw
N8	8	Todd Clever (c)
OF	7	Peter Dahl
BF	6	John Quill	(substituted off) 61'
RL	5	Louis Stanfill
LL	4	Brian Doyle
TP	3	Eric Fry
HK	2	Zach Fenoglio
LP	1	Shawn Pittman
Replacements:
HK	16	Tom Coolican
PR	17	Phil Thiel
PR	18	Nicholas Wallace
LK	19	Graham Harriman
FL	20	Liam Murphy	(substituted in) 61'
SH	21	Chris Saint
FH	22	Seamus Kelly	(substituted in) 72'
WG	23	Blaine Scully	(substituted in) 70'
Coach:
(United States) Mike Tolkin

Man of the Match:
Tyler Ardron (Canada)

Touch judges:
(Canada) David Smortchevsky
(Canada) Chris Assmus

=== Week 2 ===
1 June 2013
15:40 FJT (UTC+12)

Fiji	22–8	Japan
Try: Bobo 1' m Naikatini 49' m Natoga 69' c Nadolo 85' m Con: Koroilagilagi (1/3)	Report; IRB	Try: Fukuoka 81' m Pen: Goromaru (1/2) 46'

Churchill Park, Lautoka
Attendance: 3,500
Referee: Garratt Williamson (New Zealand)

FB	15	Simeli Koniferedi	(substituted off) 57'
RW	14	Adriu Delai	(substituted off) 68'
OC	13	Nemani Nadolo
IC	12	Leone Tabuarua
LW	11	Sireli Bobo
FH	10	Setareki Koroilagilagi	(substituted off) 72'
SH	9	Nemia Kenatale
N8	8	Netani Talei
OF	7	Akapusi Qera (c)	(substituted off) 66'
BF	6	Apisai Naikatini
RL	5	Wame Lewaravu	(substituted off) 62'
LL	4	Apisalome Ratuniyarawa
TP	3	Jerry Yanuyanutawa	(substituted off) 46'
HK	2	Talemaitoga Tuapati	(substituted off) 72'
LP	1	Setefano Somoca	(substituted off) 40'
Replacements:
HK	16	Viliame Veikoso	(substituted in) 72'
PR	17	Manasa Saulo	(substituted in) 40'
PR	18	Campese Ma'afu	(substituted in) 46'
LK	19	Rupeni Nasiga	(substituted in) 62'
FL	20	Malakai Ravulo	(substituted in) 66'
SH	21	Nikola Matawalu	(substituted in) 57'
FH	22	Jiuta Lutumailagi	(substituted in) 72'
WG	23	Aisea Natoga	(substituted in) 68'
Coach:
(Fiji) Inoke Male

FB	15	Ayumu Goromaru
RW	14	Yuta Imamura
OC	13	Male Sa'u
IC	12	Harumichi Tatekawa
LW	11	Hirotoki Onozawa	(substituted off) 58'
FH	10	Yuu Tamura	(substituted off) 58'
SH	9	Atsushi Hiwasa	(substituted off) 72'
N8	8	Takashi Kikutani (c)
OF	7	Hendrik Tui
BF	6	Michael Leitch	(substituted off) 46'
RL	5	Michael Broadhurst
LL	4	Hitoshi Ono
TP	3	Kensuke Hatakeyama	(substituted off) 46'
HK	2	Yusuke Aoki	(substituted off) 46'
LP	1	Masataka Mikami	(substituted off) 78'
Replacements:
HK	16	Takeshi Kizu	(substituted in) 46'
PR	17	Takuma Asahara	(substituted in) 78'
PR	18	Hiroshi Yamashita	(substituted in) 46'
LK	19	Toshizumi Kitagawa	(substituted in) 46'
N8	20	Shoji Ito
SH	21	Keisuke Uchida	(substituted in) 72'
FH	22	Craig Wing	(substituted in) 58'
WG	23	Kenki Fukuoka	(substituted in) 58'
Coach:
(Australia) Eddie Jones

Man of the Match:
Nemani Nadolo (Fiji)

Touch judges:
(Fiji) Sam Tuidraki
(Fiji) Mikea Rokodrakia

=== Week 3 ===
5 June 2013
18:40 EDT (UTC-04)

Canada	20–18	Fiji
Try: Carpenter 12' c Jones 44' m Barkwill 55' m Con: Braid (1/3); Pen: Braid (1/4) 28'	Report; IRB	Try: Nadolo 16' m Qera 73' c Con: Nadolo (1/2); Pen: Nadolo (2/2) 26', 30'

Twin Elm Rugby Park, Ottawa
Attendance: 4,548
Referee: JP Doyle (England)

FB	15	Connor Braid
RW	14	Matt Evans
OC	13	Ciaran Hearn
IC	12	Harry Jones	(substituted off) 56'
LW	11	Taylor Paris
FH	10	Liam Underwood
SH	9	Phil Mack	(substituted off) 80'
N8	8	Aaron Carpenter (c)	(substituted off) 40'
OF	7	Nanyak Dala	(substituted off) 65'
BF	6	Tyler Ardron
RL	5	Tyler Hotson
LL	4	Jon Phelan
TP	3	Jason Marshall
HK	2	Ryan Hamilton	(substituted off) 52'
LP	1	Andrew Tiedemann	(substituted off) 53'
Replacements:
HK	16	Ray Barkwill	(substituted in) 52'
PR	17	Hubert Buydens	(substituted in) 53'
PR	18	Tom Dolezel
LK	19	Jebb Sinclair	(substituted in) 40'
FL	20	John Moonlight	(substituted in) 65'
SH	21	Sean White	(substituted in) 80'
FH	22	Nathan Hirayama
CE	23	Nick Blevins	(substituted in) 56'
Coach:
(New Zealand) Kieran Crowley

FB	15	Simeli Koniferedi
RW	14	Adriu Delai	(substituted off) 68'
OC	13	Nemani Nadolo
IC	12	Leone Tabuarua
LW	11	Aisea Natoga
FH	10	Setareki Koroilagilagi	(substituted off) 65'
SH	9	Nemia Kenatale	(substituted off) 67'
N8	8	Akapusi Qera (c)
OF	7	Malakai Ravulo	(substituted off) 74'
BF	6	Apisai Naikatini	(substituted off) 54'
RL	5	Wame Lewaravu
LL	4	Apisalome Ratuniyarawa
TP	3	Setefano Somoca	(substituted off) 61'
HK	2	Talemaitoga Tuapati	(substituted off) 72'
LP	1	Jerry Yanuyanutawa	(substituted off) 54'
Replacements:
HK	16	Viliame Veikoso	(substituted in) 72'
PR	17	Manasa Saulo	(substituted in) 61'
PR	18	Campese Ma'afu	(substituted in) 54'
FL	19	Iliesa Ratuva	(substituted in) 74'
FL	20	Samuel Matavesi	(substituted in) 54'
SH	21	Aporosa Kenatale	(substituted in) 67'
FH	22	Jiuta Lutumailagi	(substituted in) 65'
CE	23	Iliesa Salusalu	(substituted in) 68'
Coach:
(Fiji) Inoke Male

Man of the Match:
Phil Mack (Canada)

Touch judges:
(United States) Brian Zapp
(United States) Leah Berard

=== Week 4 ===
8 June 2013
14:10 EDT (UTC-04)

Canada	36–27	Tonga
Try: Evans 43' c Duke 47' c Pritchard 54' c Con: Pritchard (3/3); Pen: Pritchard (4/4) 7', 19', 34', 78'; Hearn (1/1) 51'	Report; IRB	Try: Lokotui 2' c Iongi 65' c Vainikolo 70' m Helu 74' m Con: Morath (1/1); Hakalo (1/2); Pen: Morath (1/2) 49'

Richardson Memorial Stadium, Kingston, Ontario
Attendance: 3,117
Referee: JP Doyle (England)

FB	15	James Pritchard
RW	14	Matt Evans		(substituted off) 56'
OC	13	Ciaran Hearn		(substituted off) 56'
IC	12	Nick Blevins
LW	11	Sean Duke
FH	10	Nathan Hirayama
SH	9	Sean White		(substituted off) 65'
N8	8	Aaron Carpenter (c)		(substituted off) 66'
OF	7	John Moonlight
BF	6	Jebb Sinclair
RL	5	Tyler Hotson		(substituted off) 66'
LL	4	Brett Beukeboom
TP	3	Jason Marshall		(substituted off) 56'
HK	2	Ray Barkwill		(substituted off) 40'
LP	1	Hubert Buydens		(substituted off) 62'
Replacements:
HK	16	Ryan Hamilton		(substituted in) 40'
PR	17	Doug Wooldridge		(substituted in) 56'
PR	18	Tom Dolezel		(substituted in) 62'
FL	19	Nanyak Dala		(substituted in) 66'
N8	20	Tyler Ardron	(yellow card) 70' to 80'	(substituted in) 66'
SH	21	Phil Mack		(substituted in) 65'
FH	22	Liam Underwood		(substituted in) 56'
CE	23	Pat Parfrey		(substituted in) 56'
Coach:
(New Zealand) Kieran Crowley

FB	15	Viliami Hakalo
RW	14	Fetuʻu Vainikolo
OC	13	Siale Piutau		(substituted off) 62'
IC	12	Sione Piukala	(yellow card) 50' to 60'
LW	11	William Helu
FH	10	Kurt Morath		(substituted off) 53'
SH	9	Taniela Moa		(substituted off) 49'
N8	8	Viliami Fihaki		(substituted off) 36'
OF	7	Nili Latu (c)
BF	6	Hale T-Pole		(substituted off) 62'
RL	5	Tukulua Lokotui		(substituted off) 49'
LL	4	Emosi Kauhenga
TP	3	Taione Vea		(substituted off) 62'
HK	2	Ilaisa Maʻasi		(substituted off) 49'
LP	1	Eddie Aholelei	(red card) 34'
Replacements:
HK	16	Elvis Taione		(substituted in) 49'
PR	17	Kamaliele Sakalia		(substituted in) 36'
PR	18	Sila Puafisi		(substituted in) 62'
LK	19	Joshua Afu		(substituted in) 49'
N8	20	Paula Kaho		(substituted in) 62'
SH	21	Tomasi Palu		(substituted in) 49'
FH	22	Viliame Iongi		(substituted in) 62'
CE	23	David Halaifonua	(yellow card) 56' to 66'	(substituted in) 53'
Coach:
(Tonga) Mana Otai

Man of the Match:
John Moonlight (Canada)

Touch judges:
(United States) Nick Ricono
(United States) Gareth Morgan

=== Week 5 ===
14 June 2013
19:30 PDT (UTC-8)

United States	9–18	Tonga
Pen: Wyles (3/4) 4', 20', 31'	Report; IRB	Try: Piukala (2) 15' c, 42' m Con: Hakalo (1/1); Pen: Hakalo (1/1) 7'; Palu (1/1) 64'

StubHub Center, California
Attendance: 6,000
Referee: Francisco Pastrana (Argentina)

FB	15	Chris Wyles
RW	14	Takudzwa Ngwenya
OC	13	Seamus Kelly
IC	12	Andrew Suniula
LW	11	James Paterson
FH	10	Toby L'Estrange	(substituted off) 68'
SH	9	Mike Petri
N8	8	Todd Clever (c)
OF	7	Peter Dahl	(substituted off) 54'
BF	6	Scott Lavalla
RL	5	Louis Stanfill
LL	4	Brian Doyle
TP	3	Eric Fry	(substituted off) 61'
HK	2	Chris Biller	(substituted off) 68'
LP	1	Shawn Pittman
Replacements:
HK	16	Zach Fenoglio	(substituted in) 68'
PR	17	Nicholas Wallace	(substituted in) 61'
PR	18	Phil Thiel
LK	19	Graham Harriman
FL	20	John Quill	(substituted in) 54'
SH	21	Robbie Shaw	(substituted in) 54'
FH	22	Adam Siddall	(substituted in) 68'
FB	23	Blaine Scully
Coach:
(United States) Mike Tolkin

FB	15	Viliami Hakalo	(substituted off) 36'
RW	14	Viliame Iongi
OC	13	Fraser Anderson
IC	12	Sione Piukala
LW	11	William Helu
FH	10	Taniela Moa	(substituted off) 75'
SH	9	Tomasi Palu
N8	8	Paula Kaho	(substituted off) 51'
OF	7	Nili Latu (c)
BF	6	Hale T-Pole
RL	5	Tukulua Lokotui
LL	4	Joshua Afu	(substituted off) 72'
TP	3	Taione Vea
HK	2	Elvis Taione	(substituted off) 70'
LP	1	Kamaliele Sakalia	(substituted off) 64'
Replacements:
HK	16	Ilaisa Maʻasi
PR	17	Peni Fakalelu	(substituted in) 64'
PR	18	Sila Puafisi
LK	19	Emosi Kauhenga	(substituted in) 72'
LK	20	Daniel Faleafa	(substituted in) 75'
SH	21	Siale Fahiua
FH	22	Samisoni Pone	(substituted in) 36'
CE	23	Soni Masima	(substituted in) 70'
Coach:
(Tonga) Mana Otai

Touch judges:
(Canada) Bryan Arciero
(Canada) David Smortchevsky

=== Week 6 ===
19 June 2013
17:10 JST (UTC+9)

Fiji	35 – 10	United States
Try: Matawalu 17' c Nagusa 23' c Matadigo 46' m Kenatale 58' c Con: Baikeinuku (3/4); Pen: Baikeinuku (3/3) 12', 53', 79'	Report; IRB	Try: Suniula 38' c Con: Siddall (1/1); Pen: Siddall (1/1) 9'

Mizuho Rugby Stadium, Nagoya
Attendance: 3,459
Referee: Greg Garner (England)

FB	15	Timoci Nagusa	(substituted off) 40'
RW	14	Napolioni Nalaga
OC	13	Nemani Nadolo
IC	12	Seremaia Bai (vc)
LW	11	Sireli Bobo	(substituted off) 56'
FH	10	Setareki Koroilagilagi	(substituted off) 56'
SH	9	Nikola Matawalu
N8	8	Masi Matadigo
OF	7	Akapusi Qera (c)	(substituted off) 51'
BF	6	Netani Talei
RL	5	Apisai Naikatini	(substituted off) 56'
LL	4	Apisalome Ratuniyarawa
TP	3	Jerry Yanuyanutawa	(substituted off) 40'
HK	2	Tuapati Talemaitoga	(substituted off) 40'
LP	1	Setefano Somoca	(substituted off) 40'
Replacements:
HK	16	Viliame Veikoso	(substituted in) 40'
PR	17	Campese Ma'afu	(substituted in) 40'
PR	18	Manasa Saulo	(substituted in) 40'
LK	19	Iliesa Ratuva	(substituted in) 56'
FL	20	Malakai Ravulo	(substituted in) 51'
SH	21	Nemia Kenatale	(substituted in) 40'
CE	22	Leone Tabuarua	(substituted in) 56'
WG	23	Adriu Delai	(substituted in) 56'
Coach:
(Fiji) Inoke Male

FB	15	Blaine Scully
RW	14	Luke Hume
OC	13	Adam Siddall
IC	12	Seamus Kelly
LW	11	James Paterson	(substituted off) 33'
FH	10	Toby L'Estrange	(substituted off) 68'
SH	9	Robbie Shaw	(substituted off) 55'
N8	8	Cam Dolan
OF	7	Peter Dahl	(substituted off) 33'
BF	6	John Quill
RL	5	Louis Stanfill (c)
LL	4	Graham Harriman
TP	3	Eric Fry	(substituted off) 40'
HK	2	Zach Fenoglio	(substituted off) 63'
LP	1	Nick Wallace	(substituted off) 40'
Replacements:
HK	16	Chris Biller	(substituted in) 63'
PR	17	Shawn Pittman	(substituted in) 40'
PR	18	Phil Thiel	(substituted in) 40'
LK	19	Brian Doyle	(substituted in) 33'
FL	20	Todd Clever
SH	21	Mike Petri	(substituted in) 55'
CE	22	Andrew Suniula	(substituted in) 33'
FH	23	Chris Wyles	(substituted in) 68'
Coach:
(United States) Mike Tolkin

Touch judges:
(Japan) Taizo Hirabayashi
(Japan) Takashi Harada

19 June 2013
19:10 JST (UTC+9)

Japan	16–13	Canada
Try: Goromaru 63' c Con: Goromaru (1/1); Pen: Goromaru (3/4) 45', 52', 73'	Report; IRB	Try: Hearn 53' c Con: Pritchard (1/1); Pen: Pritchard (2/2) 3', 66'

Mizuho Rugby Stadium, Nagoya
Attendance: 4,456
Referee: Jonathon White (New Zealand)

FB	15	Ayumu Goromaru
RW	14	Toshiaki Hirose (c)
OC	13	Male Sa'u
IC	12	Yuu Tamura
LW	11	Kenki Fukuoka	(substituted off) 37'
FH	10	Harumichi Tatekawa
SH	9	Fumiaki Tanaka	(substituted off) 67'
N8	8	Takashi Kikutani
OF	7	Michael Broadhurst
BF	6	Hendrik Tui
RL	5	Shinya Makabe	(substituted off) 55'
LL	4	Justin Ives	(substituted off) 73'
TP	3	Kensuke Hatakeyama	(substituted off) 70'
HK	2	Shota Horie	(substituted off) 79'
LP	1	Yusuke Nagae	(substituted off) 70'
Replacements:
HK	16	Takeshi Kizu	(substituted in) 79'
PR	17	Masataka Mikami	(substituted in) 70'
PR	18	Hiroshi Yamashita	(substituted in) 70'
LK	19	Hitoshi Ono	(substituted in) 73'
LK	20	Shoji Ito	(substituted in) 55'
SH	21	Atsushi Hiwasa	(substituted in) 67'
CE	22	Seiichi Shimonura
WG	23	Yoshikazu Fujita	(substituted in) 37'
Coach:
(Australia) Eddie Jones

FB	15	James Pritchard
RW	14	Connor Braid
OC	13	Ciaran Hearn
IC	12	Nick Blevins
LW	11	Taylor Paris	(substituted off) 60'
FH	10	Liam Underwood	(substituted off) 65'
SH	9	Sean White
N8	8	Aaron Carpenter (c)	(substituted off) 60'
OF	7	Nanyak Dala
BF	6	Tyler Ardron
RL	5	Brett Beukeboom
LL	4	Jon Phelan	(substituted off) 67'
TP	3	Jason Marshall	(substituted off) 67'
HK	2	Ryan Hamilton	(substituted off) 41'
LP	1	Hubert Buydens	(substituted off) 76'
Replacements:
HK	16	Ray Barkwill	(substituted in) 41'
PR	17	Tom Dolezel	(substituted in) 76'
PR	18	Andrew Tiedemann	(substituted in) 67'
LK	19	Cameron Pierce	(substituted in) 67'
N8	20	Aaron Flagg	(substituted in) 60'
SH	21	Eric Wilson
WG	22	Mike Fuailefau	(substituted in) 60'
FH	23	Pat Parfrey	(substituted in) 65'
Coach:
(New Zealand) Kieran Crowley

Touch judges:
(New Zealand) Richard Kelly
(Japan) Toda Kyosuke

=== Week 7 ===
23 June 2013
12:10 JST (UTC+9)

Fiji	34–21	Tonga
Try: Bobo 24' c Nalaga (2) 34' c, 69' c Nadolo 64' c Con: Bai (4/4) 25', 35', 65', 70'; Pen: Bai (2/2) 57', 74'	Report; IRB	Try: Anderson 6' m Latu 79' c Con: Fahuia (1/1) 80'; Pen: Palu (3/6) 3', 11, 41'

Chichibunomiya Rugby Stadium, Tokyo
Attendance: 7,195
Referee: Jonathon White (New Zealand)

FB	15	Nikola Matawalu
RW	14	Napolioni Nalaga
OC	13	Nemani Nadolo	(substituted off) 71'
IC	12	Saula Radidi	(substituted off) 74'
LW	11	Sireli Bobo	(substituted off) 74'
FH	10	Seremaia Bai
SH	9	Nemia Kenatale
N8	8	Netani Talei	(substituted off) 57'
OF	7	Akapusi Qera (c)
BF	6	Apisai Naikatini	(substituted off) 68'
RL	5	Wame Lewaravu
LL	4	Apisalome Ratuniyarawa
TP	3	Setefano Somoca	(substituted off) 59'
HK	2	Viliame Veikoso	(substituted off) 59'
LP	1	Campese Ma'afu	(substituted off) 40'
Replacements:
HK	16	Tuapati Talemaitoga	(substituted in) 59'
PR	17	Jerry Yanuyanutawa	(substituted in) 40'
PR	18	Manasa Saulo	(substituted in) 59'
FL	19	Rupeni Nasiga	(substituted in) 68'
FL	20	Malakai Ravulo	(substituted in) 57'
FH	21	Setareki Koroilagilagi	(substituted in) 74'
CE	22	Adriu Delai	(substituted in) 74'
WG	23	Aisea Natoga	(substituted in) 71'
Coach:
(Fiji) Inoke Male

FB	15	Viliame Iongi	(substituted off) 78'
RW	14	Fraser Anderson
OC	13	Alaska Taufa
IC	12	Sione Piukala
LW	11	William Helu	(substituted off) 18'
FH	10	Taniela Moa
SH	9	Tomasi Palu
N8	8	Hale T-Pole
OF	7	Nili Latu (c)
BF	6	Emosi Kauhenga	(substituted off) 66'
RL	5	Tukulua Lokotui	(substituted off) 80'
LL	4	Josh Afu	(substituted off) 40'
TP	3	Taione Vea	(substituted off) 51'
HK	2	Elvis Taione	(substituted off) 51'
LP	1	Peni Fakalelu	(substituted off) 40'
Replacements:
HK	16	Ilaisia Maʻasi	(substituted in) 51'
PR	17	Kama Sakalia	(substituted in) 40'
PR	18	Sila Puafisi	(substituted in) 51'
LK	19	Soni Masima	(substituted in) 80'
FL	20	Viliami Fihaki	(substituted in) 66'
FB	21	Siale Fahiua	(substituted in) 78'
WG	22	Rocky Havili	(substituted in) 18'
LK	23	Daniel Faleafa	(substituted in) 40'
Coach:
(Tonga) Mana Otai

Touch judges:
(Japan) Taizo Hirabayashi
(Japan) Matsuoka Tatsuya

23 June 2013
14:10 JST (UTC+9)

Japan	38–20	United States
Try: Fujita 7' c Sa'u 25' m Tui 37' c Hirose 43' m Penalty try 52'; Tanaka 62' c Con: Goromaru (4/6) 8', 38, 53', 62'	Report; IRB	Try: Wyles 15' c Fry 21' m Hume 67' m Con: Wyles (1/3) 16'; Pen: Wyles (1/1) 30'

Chichibunomiya Rugby Stadium, Tokyo
Attendance: 9,467
Referee: Greg Garner (England)

FB	15	Ayumu Goromaru
RW	14	Toshiaki Hirose (c)
OC	13	Male Sa'u
IC	12	Craig Wing	(substituted off) 26'
LW	11	Yoshikazu Fujita	(substituted off) 78'
FH	10	Harumichi Tatekawa
SH	9	Fumiaki Tanaka	(substituted off) 72'
N8	8	Takashi Kikutani
OF	7	Michael Broadhurst
BF	6	Hendrik Tui
RL	5	Shoji Ito	(substituted off) 60'
LL	4	Hitoshi Ono	(substituted off) 53'
TP	3	Hiroshi Yamashita	(substituted off) 36'
HK	2	Shota Horie	(substituted off) 78'
LP	1	Masataka Mikami	(substituted off) 72'
Replacements:
PR	16	Takeshi Kizu	(substituted in) 78'
PR	17	Yusuke Nagae	(substituted in) 72'
PR	18	Kensuke Hatakeyama	(substituted in) 36'
LK	19	Shinya Makabe	(substituted in) 53'
LK	20	Justin Ives	(substituted in) 60'
SH	21	Atsushi Hiwasa	(substituted in) 72'
CE	22	Yuu Tamura	(substituted in) 26'
WG	23	Yuta Imamura	(substituted in) 78'
Coach:
(Australia) Eddie Jones

FB	15	Chris Wyles
RW	14	Luke Hume
OC	13	Adam Siddall
IC	12	Andrew Suniula		(substituted off) 70'
LW	11	James Paterson		(substituted off) 40'
FH	10	Toby L'Estrange
SH	9	Mike Petri		(substituted off) 70'
N8	8	Todd Clever (c)
OF	7	Peter Dahl		(substituted off) 39'
BF	6	John Quill
RL	5	Louis Stanfill		(substituted off) 75'
LL	4	Brian Doyle
TP	3	Eric Fry	(yellow card) 50' to 60'	(substituted off) 72'
HK	2	Chris Biller		(substituted off) 65'
LP	1	Shawn Pittman					(substituted off) 78'
Replacements:
HK	16	Zach Fenoglio		(substituted in) 65'
PR	17	Nick Wallace			(substituted in) 50'	(substituted off) 60'	(substituted in) 78'
PR	18	Phil Thiel		(substituted in) 72'
LK	19	Cam Dolan		(substituted in) 40'	(substituted off) 50'	(substituted in) 60'
FL	20	Liam Murphy		(substituted in) 75'
SH	21	Robbie Shaw		(substituted in) 70'
CE	22	Seamus Kelly		(substituted in) 70'
WG	23	Blaine Scully		(substituted in) 40'
Coach:
(United States) Mike Tolkin

Man of the Match:
Fumiaki Tanaka (Japan)

Touch judges:
(New Zealand) Richard Kelly
(Japan) Toda Kyosuke

== Squads ==
=== Canada ===
Canada's 44-man squad for their Summer 2013 games, including the 2013 IRB Pacific Nations Cup, the June international against Ireland, and the two Rugby World Cup Qualifiers vs the United States.

Head coach: (New Zealand) Kieran Crowley

Note: Flags indicate national union for the club/province as defined by World Rugby.

Player	Position	Date of birth (age)	Caps	Club/province
Ray Barkwill	Hooker	26 August 1980 (aged 32)	2	(Canada) Ontario Blues
Micha Govorchin	Hooker		0	(Canada) Pacific Tyee
Ryan Hamilton	Hooker	9 April 1988 (aged 25)	11	(Canada) Pacific Tyee
Benoît Piffero	Hooker	21 May 1987 (aged 26)	0	(Canada) The Rock
Hubert Buydens	Prop	4 January 1982 (aged 31)	14	(New Zealand) Manawatu
Tom Dolezel	Prop	13 August 1984 (aged 28)	10	(Canada) Ontario Blues
Doug Wooldridge	Prop	19 December 1985 (aged 27)	7	(Canada) Ontario Blues
Jason Marshall	Prop	5 February 1985 (aged 28)	17	(France) La Rochelle
Andrew Tiedemann	Prop	21 July 1988 (aged 24)	16	(Canada) Prairie Wolf Pack
Brett Beukeboom	Lock	13 August 1989 (aged 23)	3	(England) Plymouth Albion
Jamie Cudmore	Lock	6 September 1978 (aged 34)	27	(France) Clermont
Aaron Flagg	Lock	16 June 1989 (aged 23)	0	(Canada) Pacific Tyee
Tyler Hotson	Lock	30 May 1985 (aged 27)	29	(England) London Scottish
Jon Phelan	Lock	20 January 1986 (aged 27)	7	(France) Lille
Cameron Pierce	Lock	26 October 1991 (aged 21)	0	(France) Section Paloise
Jebb Sinclair	Lock	8 April 1986 (aged 27)	25	(England) London Irish
Nanyak Dala	Flanker	18 June 1984 (aged 28)	18	(Canada) Prairie Wolf Pack
Thyssen de Goede	Flanker	24 June 1988 (aged 24)	0	(Canada) James Bay AA
Adam Kleeberger	Flanker	2 March 1984 (aged 29)	35	(Canada) Victoria Vikes
John Moonlight	Flanker	2 July 1987 (aged 25)	3	(Canada) Ontario Blues
Chauncey O'Toole	Flanker	22 February 1986 (aged 27)	19	(Canada) The Rock
Tyler Ardron	Number 8	16 June 1991 (aged 21)	5	(Wales) Ospreys
Aaron Carpenter (c)	Number 8	9 January 1983 (age 43)	47	(England) Cornish Pirates
Phil Mack	Scrum-half	18 September 1985 (aged 27)	9	(Canada) Pacific Tyee
Jamie Mackenzie	Scrum-half	28 February 1989 (aged 24)	3	(Canada) Ontario Blues
Eric Wilson	Scrum-half	27 April 1983 (aged 30)	2	(Canada) Meraloma Rugby
Sean White	Scrum-half	28 June 1988 (aged 24)	18	(Canada) Pacific Tyee
Connor Braid	Fly-half	31 May 1990 (aged 22)	4	(England) Rotherham
Nathan Hirayama	Fly-half	23 March 1988 (aged 25)	9	(Canada) Victoria Vikes
Harry Jones	Fly-half	26 June 1989 (aged 23)	1	(Canada) Capilano
Pat Parfrey	Fly-half	1 November 1991 (aged 21)	0	(Canada) The Rock
Nick Blevins	Centre	11 November 1988 (aged 24)	8	(Canada) Prairie Wolf Pack
Ciaran Hearn	Centre	30 December 1985 (aged 27)	24	(Canada) The Rock
Phil Mackenzie	Centre	25 February 1987 (age 38)	17	(England) Sale Sharks
Conor Trainor	Centre	5 December 1989 (aged 23)	7	(Canada) Pacific Tyee
Sean Duke	Wing	7 May 1988 (aged 25)	9	(Canada) Pacific Tyee
Mike Fuailefau	Wing	20 March 1991 (aged 22)	0	(Canada) Pacific Tyee
Jeff Hassler	Wing	21 August 1991 (aged 21)	4	(Wales) Ospreys
Taylor Paris	Wing	6 October 1992 (aged 20)	5	(France) Agen
DTH van der Merwe	Fullback	28 April 1986 (aged 27)	24	(Scotland) Glasgow Warriors
Matt Evans	Fullback	2 January 1988 (aged 25)	18	(England) Cornish Pirates
James Pritchard (vc)	Fullback	21 July 1979 (aged 33)	47	(England) Bedford Blues
Liam Underwood	Fullback	3 June 1991 (aged 21)	0	(Canada) Ontario Blues
Jordan Wilson-Ross	Fullback	17 January 1989 (aged 24)	0	(Canada) Ontario Blues

=== Fiji ===
35-man extended Fiji squad for the 2013 IRB Pacific Nations Cup.

- Head coach: (Fiji) Inoke Male

Forwards
Player	Position	Club
Seremaia Naureure	Hooker	(Fiji) Nadroga
Talemaitoga Tuapati	Hooker	(New Zealand) Southland
Viliame Veikoso	Hooker	(Fiji) Suva
Waisea Daveta	Prop	(Fiji) Nadroga
Campese Ma'afu	Prop	(Wales) Cardiff Blues
Manasa Saulo	Prop	(Fiji) Suva
Setefano Somoca	Prop	(Fiji) Nadroga
Jerry Yanuyanutawa	Prop	(England) London Irish
Wame Lewaravu	Lock	(France) Mont-de-Marsan
Apisai Naikatini	Lock	(Japan) Toyota Verblitz
Rupeni Nasiga	Lock	(England) Plymouth Albion
Api Ratuniyarawa	Lock	(New Zealand) North Harbour
Savenaca Tabakanalagi	Lock	(Fiji) Suva
Jolame Bera	Flanker	(Fiji) Suva
Samuel Matavesi	Flanker	(England) Plymouth Albion
Iliesa Ratuva	Flanker	(Fiji) Nadroga
Malakai Ravulo	Flanker	(New Zealand) North Harbour
Akapusi Qera	Flanker	(England) Gloucester
Sakiusa Matadigo	Number eight	(France) Racing Metro
Netani Talei	Number eight	(Scotland) Edinburgh

Backs
Player	Position	Club
Aporosa Kenatale	Scrum-half	(Fiji) Suva
Nemia Kenatale	Scrum-half	(New Zealand) Southland
Nikola Matawalu	Scrum-half	(Scotland) Glasgow Warriors
Setareki Koroilagilagi	Fly-half	(Fiji) Lautoka
Jiuta Lutumailagi	Fly-half	(Fiji) Nadroga
Seremaia Bai	Fly-half	(France) Castres
Adriu Delai	Centre	(France) Massy
Saula Radidi	Centre	(France) Pau
Iliesa Salusalu	Centre	(Fiji) Namosi
Leone Tabuarua	Centre	(Fiji) Suva
Nemani Nadolo	Wing	(Japan) Green Rockets
Timoci Nagusa	Wing	(France) Montpellier
Sireli Bobo	Wing	(France) Racing Metro
Aisea Natoga	Wing	(Wales) Ospreys

=== Japan ===
Japanese 35-man squad for 2013 IRB Pacific Nations Cup and 2013 Welsh rugby union tour of Japan.

- Head coach: (Australia) Eddie Jones
- Caps updated: 13 May 2013

Note: Flags indicate national union for the club/province as defined by World Rugby.

Player	Position	Date of birth (age)	Caps	Club/province
Yusuke Aoki	Hooker	19 June 1983 (aged 29)	25	(Japan) Suntory Sungoliath
Shota Horie	Hooker	21 January 1986 (aged 27)	19	(Australia) Melbourne Rebels
Hiroki Yuhara	Hooker	21 January 1984 (aged 29)	11	(Japan) Toshiba Brave Lupus
Takuma Asahara	Prop	7 September 1987 (aged 25)	4	(Japan) Toshiba Brave Lupus
Kensuke Hatakeyama	Prop	2 August 1985 (aged 27)	39	(Japan) Suntory Sungoliath
Takeshi Kizu	Prop	15 July 1988 (aged 24)	16	(Japan) Kobelco Steelers
Masataka Mikami	Prop	4 June 1988 (aged 24)	3	(Japan) Toshiba Brave Lupus
Yusuke Nagae	Prop	19 July 1985 (aged 27)	9	(Japan) Ricoh Black Rams
Hiroshi Yamashita	Prop	1 January 1986 (aged 27)	19	(Japan) Kobelco Steelers
Michael Broadhurst	Lock	30 October 1986 (aged 26)	6	(Japan) Ricoh Black Rams
Shoji Ito	Lock	2 December 1980 (aged 32)	11	(Japan) Kobelco Steelers
Shinya Makabe	Lock	26 March 1987 (aged 26)	13	(Japan) Suntory Sungoliath
Hitoshi Ono	Lock	6 May 1978 (aged 35)	67	(Japan) Toshiba Brave Lupus
Hendrik Tui	Lock	13 December 1987 (aged 25)	8	(Japan) Panasonic Wild Knights
Justin Ives	Flanker	24 May 1984 (aged 29)	11	(Japan) Panasonic Wild Knights
Michael Leitch	Flanker	7 October 1988 (aged 24)	28	(New Zealand) Chiefs
Ryuta Yasui	Flanker	6 December 1989 (aged 23)	1	(Japan) Kobelco Steelers
Takashi Kikutani (c)	Number 8	24 February 1980 (aged 33)	57	(Japan) Toyota Verblitz
Koliniasi Holani	Number 8	25 October 1981 (aged 31)	25	(Japan) Panasonic Wild Knights
Atsushi Hiwasa	Scrum-half	22 May 1987 (aged 26)	21	(Japan) Suntory Sungoliath
Fumiaki Tanaka	Scrum-half	3 January 1985 (aged 28)	33	(New Zealand) Highlanders
Keisuke Uchida	Scrum-half	22 February 1992 (aged 21)	3	(Japan) University of Tsukuba
Ryoto Nakamura	Fly-half	28 January 1991 (aged 22)	1	(Japan) Teikyo University
Kosei Ono	Fly-half	17 April 1987 (aged 26)	17	(Japan) Suntory Sungoliath
Yuu Tamura	Fly-half	9 January 1989 (aged 24)	7	(Japan) NEC Green Rockets
Yuta Imamura	Centre	31 October 1984 (aged 28)	36	(Japan) Kobelco Steelers
Male Sa'u	Centre	13 October 1987 (aged 25)	3	(Japan) Yamaha Jubilo
Seiichi Shimonura	Centre	20 September 1981 (aged 31)	4	(Japan) Panasonic Wild Knights
Harumichi Tatekawa	Centre	2 December 1989 (aged 23)	13	(Japan) Kubota Spears
Craig Wing	Centre	26 December 1979 (aged 33)	1	(Japan) Kobelco Steelers
Yoshikazu Fujita	Wing	8 October 1993 (aged 19)	4	(Japan) Waseda University
Kenki Fukuoka	Wing	7 September 1992 (aged 20)	2	(Japan) University of Tsukuba
Toshiaki Hirose	Wing	17 October 1981 (aged 31)	12	(Japan) Toshiba Brave Lupus
Hirotoki Onozawa	Wing	29 March 1978 (aged 35)	78	(Japan) Suntory Sungoliath
Ayumu Goromaru	Fullback	1 March 1986 (aged 27)	23	(Japan) Yamaha Jubilo

=== Tonga ===
28-man Tonga squad for the 2013 IRB Pacific Nations Cup, 10 non-travelling reserves were also named.

Forwards
Player	Position	Club
Ilaisa Maʻasi	Hooker	(France) CS Viennie
Elvis Taione	Hooker	(England) Jersey
Eddie ʻAholelei	Prop	(Australia) Melbourne Rebels
Peni Fakalelu	Prop	(France) Pau
Sila Puafisi	Prop	(New Zealand) Tasman
Kamaliele Sakalia	Prop	(Tonga) Marist
Taione Vea	Prop	(New Zealand) North Harbour
Daniel Faleafa	Lock	(New Zealand) Northland
Samisoni Fifita Masima	Lock	(Tonga) Sila Pelu Ua
Tukulua Lokotui	Lock	(England) Gloucester
Rota Setu Ruirata	Lock	(Japan) Kamaishi
Viliami Fihaki	Flanker	(New Zealand) North Harbour
Paula Kaho	Flanker	(Australia) Canberra Vikings
Nili Latu	Flanker	(Japan) Green Rockets
Sione Kalamafoni	Number eight	(England) Gloucester
Viliami Maʻafu	Number eight	(New Zealand) Massey

Backs
Player	Position	Club
Taniela Moa	Scrum-half	(France) Pau
Tomasi Palu	Scrum-half	(New Zealand) Wellington
Fangatapu Apikotoa	Fly-half	(Italy) Amatori
Kurt Morath	Fly-half	(Japan) Kubota Spears
Suka Hufanga	Centre	(England) Newcastle Falcons
Sione Piukala	Centre	(France) Perpignan
Siale Piutau	Centre	(Japan) Yamaha Júbilo
William Helu	Wing	(Australia) Manly
Viliame Iongi	Wing	(Tonga) Marist
Fetuʻu Vainikolo	Wing	(Ireland) Connacht
Viliami Hakalo	Fullback	(Tonga) Spartan
David Halaifonua	Fullback	(Tonga) Hofoa

==== Non-travelling reserves ====
Reserves
Player	Position	Club
Ofa Faingaʻanuku	Prop	(Scotland) Glasgow Warriors
Akameta Feʻao	Lock	(Tonga) Toloa Old Boys
Emosi Kauhenga	Lock	(Japan) Ricoh Black Rams
Hale T-Pole	Flanker	(New Zealand) Northland
Sione Vaiomoʻunga	Flanker	(France) CS Vienne
Finau Tupa	Number eight	(Japan) Honda Motor
Siale Fahiua	Scrum-half	(Tonga) Toa ko Maʻafu
Manu Ahotaeiloa	Centre	(France) Bayonne
Fraser Anderson	Centre	(Japan) Kobelco Steelers
Alaska Taufa	Wing	(Japan) Akita

=== United States ===
Eagles 30-man training squad for the 2013 IRB Pacific Nations Cup.

- Head coach: (United States) Mike Tolkin

Note: Flags indicate national union for the club/province as defined by World Rugby.

Player	Position	Date of birth (age)	Caps	Club/province
Chris Biller	Hooker	11 October 1985 (aged 27)	22	(United States) SFGG
Tom Coolican	Hooker	26 August 1988 (aged 24)	0	(Australia) Waratahs A
Zach Fenoglio	Hooker	29 July 1989 (aged 23)	1	(United States) OMBAC
Eric Fry	Prop	14 September 1987 (aged 25)	12	(England) London Scottish F.C.
Mike MacDonald	Prop	27 November 1980 (aged 32)	67	(United States) Olympic Club
Shawn Pittman	Prop	22 January 1988 (aged 25)	23	(Republic of Ireland) Trinity
Phil Thiel	Hooker	29 October 1984 (aged 28)	12	(United States) Life
Nicholas Wallace	Prop	16 October 1989 (aged 23)	0	(United States) St Mary's College
John Cullen	Lock	16 May 1990 (aged 23)	0	Unattached
Brian Doyle	Lock	28 February 1984 (aged 29)	8	(United States) NYAC
Graham Harriman	Lock	23 February 1987 (aged 26)	1	(United States) Chicago Griffins
Louis Stanfill	Lock	30 May 1985 (aged 27)	36	(Italy) Vicenza Rangers
Peter Dahl	Flanker	11 November 1984 (aged 28)	5	(United States) Belmont Shore
Cam Dolan	Flanker	7 March 1990 (aged 23)	0	(United States) Life University
Liam Murphy	Flanker	11 July 1988 (aged 24)	0	(United States) Boston
John Quill	Flanker	3 October 1990 (aged 22)	3	(Republic of Ireland) Dolphin
Todd Clever (c)	Number 8	16 January 1983 (aged 30)	46	(Japan) NTT Communications Shining Arcs
Shaun Davies	Scrum-half	20 June 1989 (aged 23)	1	(United States) Glendale
Chris Saint	Scrum-half	18 July 1989 (aged 23)	0	(United States) Penn State
Robbie Shaw	Scrum-half	24 July 1983 (aged 29)	5	(England) Richmond
Toby L'Estrange	Fly-half	2 September 1988 (aged 24)	3	(United States) NYAC
Adam Siddall	Fly-half	27 July 1988 (aged 24)	0	(United States) Old Blue
Troy Hall	Centre	16 February 1982 (aged 31)	1	(United States) NYAC
Chad London	Centre		0	(United States) Glendale
Seamus Kelly	Centre	30 May 1991 (aged 21)	0	(United States) California Golden Bears
Andrew Suniula	Centre	29 September 1982 (aged 30)	18	(United States) Chicago Griffins
Luke Hume	Wing	26 January 1988 (aged 25)	6	(United States) USA 7's
Zachary Pangelinan	Wing	16 June 1988 (aged 24)	0	(United States) OMBAC
James Paterson	Fullback	11 April 1987 (aged 26)	7	(United States) Glendale
Blaine Scully	Fullback	29 February 1988 (aged 25)	8	(United States) USA 7's

== Statistics ==
=== Top points scorers ===
Pos	Name	Team	Points
1	James Pritchard	Canada	31
2	Seremaia Bai	Fiji	29
2	Ayumu Goromaru	Japan	29
4	Chris Wyles	United States	19
5	Connor Braid	Canada	16
6	Nemani Nadolo	Fiji	15
6	Fetuʻu Vainikolo	Tonga	15
8	Adam Siddall	United States	14
9	Tomasi Palu	Tonga	12
10	8 players		10

=== Top try scorers ===
Pos	Name	Team	Tries
1	Nemani Nadolo	Fiji	3
1	Fetuʻu Vainikolo	Tonga	3
3	Sireli Bobo	Fiji	2
3	Kenki Fukuoka	Japan	2
3	William Helu	Tonga	2
3	Sione Piukala	Tonga	2
3	Napolioni Nalaga	Fiji	2
3	Male Sa'u	Japan	2
3	Hendrik Tui	Japan	2
9	28 players + 1 penalty try		1

== See also ==
- 2013 IRB Nations Cup
- 2013 IRB Tbilisi Cup
