= 2012 International Rugby Series =

2012 IRB International Rugby Series
Date	9 to 17 November 2012
Teams	5
Countries	Canada; Russia; Samoa; Tonga; United States
Matches played	4
Venue	Eirias Stadium, Colwyn Bay, Wales
- Champions

The 2012 IRB International Rugby Series was the first edition of a rugby union tournament, created by the International Rugby Board for tier two and tier three nations, played at Parc Eirias, Colwyn Bay in Wales. The matches between Canada, Russia, Samoa, Tonga and the United States were played over two match days on 9 November and 17 November 2012.

The aim of the tournament was to increase the competitiveness between emerging rugby nations before the 2015 Rugby World Cup, to be held in England and Wales. Other unions involved in the 2012 International Rugby Series were Chile, Fiji, Georgia, Japan, Portugal, Romania and Uruguay.

The tournament matches were in addition to those between tier one and tier two/three nations within the 2012-2019 international tours and test schedule which increased the opportunities for emerging rugby nations to play the world's best teams in June and November.

== Fixtures ==
9 November 2012
18:00 WET/GMT+0 (UTC+0)

United States	40–26	Russia
Try: Fry 6' c L'Estrange 17' c Doyle 36' c Wyles 46' c Shaw 50' m, 58' c Con: Wyles (5/6)	Report	Try: Ostroushko 53' m Temnov (2) 61' m, 71' c Con: Klyuchnikov (1/3); Pen: Klyuchnikov 2', 12', 25' (3/4)

Eirias Stadium, Colwyn Bay, Wales
Referee: Leighton Hodges (Wales)

FB	15	Chris Wyles
RW	14	Cornelius Dirksen
OC	13	Paul Emerick
IC	12	Andrew Suniula
LW	11	Luke Hume
FH	10	Toby L'Estrange
SH	9	Robbie Shaw
N8	8	Todd Clever (c)
OF	7	John Quill
BF	6	Scott LaValla
RL	5	Louis Stanfill
LL	4	Brian Doyle
TP	3	Eric Fry
HK	2	Chris Biller
LP	1	Shawn Pittman
Replacements:
HK	16	Zach Fenoglio
PR	17	Nicholas Wallace
PR	18	Anthony Purpura
FL	19	Inaki Basauri
FL	20	Peter Dahl
SH	21	Mike Petri
CE	22	Roland Suniula
FH	23	Gearoid McDonald
Coach:
Mike Tolkin

FB	15	Igor Klyuchnikov
RW	14	Denis Simplikevich
OC	13	Vasily Artemyev
IC	12	Alexey Makovetskiy
LW	11	Vladimir Ostroushko
FH	10	Sergey Sugrobov
SH	9	Alexey Shcherban
N8	8	Victor Gresev
OF	7	Pavel Butenko
BF	6	Andrey Temnov
RL	5	Kirill Kulemin
LL	4	Alexander Voytov (c)
TP	3	Evgeny Pronenko
HK	2	Valery Tsnobiladze
LP	1	Gregory Tsnobiladze
Replacements:
HK	16	Vladislav Korshunov
PR	17	Alexey Volkov
PR	18	Innokenty Zykov
LK	19	Vladimir Boltenkov
FL	20	Andrey Garbuzov
SH	21	Gleb Babkin
FH	22	Ramil Gysin
CE	23	Dmitry Gerasimov
Coach:
(Wales) Kingsley Jones

Touch judges:
Wayne Davies (Wales)
Chris Williams (Wales)
Television match official:
Huw Lewis (Wales)

9 November 2012
20:00 WET/GMT+0 (UTC+0)

Canada	12–42	Samoa
Try: Moonlight 70' m Braid 74' c Con: Pritchard (1/2)	Report	Try: Tuifu'a 4' c Lilomaiava 16' m, 21' c, 41' c, 66' c Con: So'oialo (4/5); Pen: So'oialo 14', 50', 54' (3/3)

Eirias Stadium, Colwyn Bay, Wales
Attendance: 2,859
Referee: Francisco Pastrana (Argentina)

FB	15	James Pritchard
RW	14	Taylor Paris
OC	13	Ciaran Hearn
IC	12	Phil Mackenzie		(substituted off) 31'
LW	11	Matt Evans		(substituted off) 65'
FH	10	Connor Braid
SH	9	Sean White		(substituted off) 67'
N8	8	Aaron Carpenter (c)
OF	7	Chauncey O'Toole
BF	6	Tyler Ardron		(substituted off) 65'
RL	5	Tyler Hotson
LL	4	Jon Phelan		(substituted off) 65'
TP	3	Doug Wooldridge		(substituted off) 50'
HK	2	Ray Barkwill		(substituted off) 50'
LP	1	Hubert Buydens		(substituted off) 59'
Replacements:
HK	16	Ryan Hamilton		(substituted in) 50'
PR	17	Jason Marshall		(substituted in) 50'
PR	18	Andrew Tiedemann		(substituted in) 59'
LK	19	Brett Beukeboom		(substituted in) 65'
FL	20	John Moonlight		(substituted in) 65'
SH	21	Eric Wilson		(substituted in) 67'
CE	22	Nick Blevins	(yellow card) 53' to 63'	(substituted in) 31'
WG	23	Jeff Hassler		(substituted in) 65'
Coach:
(New Zealand) Kieran Crowley

FB	15	James So'oialo
RW	14	Paul Perez
OC	13	George Pisi
IC	12	Setaimata Sa	(substituted off) 51'
LW	11	Robert Lilomaiava
FH	10	Tusi Pisi	(substituted off) 67'
SH	9	Jeremy Su'a	(substituted off) 63'
N8	8	Taiasina Tuifu'a	(substituted off) 51'
OF	7	Fomai Tivaini
BF	6	Ofisa Treviranus	(substituted off) 61'
RL	5	Filo Paulo
LL	4	Fa'atiga Lemalu
TP	3	Census Johnston	(substituted off) 58'
HK	2	Ole Avei
LP	1	Sakaria Taulafo (c)	(substituted off) 67'
Replacements:
PR	16	Viliamu Afatia	(substituted in) 67'
LK	17	Joe Tekori	(substituted in) 61'
PR	18	James Johnston	(substituted in) 58'
HK	19	Ropeti Lafo		(substituted in) 72'
FB	20	Fa'atoina Autagavaia	(substituted in) 67'
SH	21	Kahn Fotuali'i	(substituted in) 63'
CE	22	Johnny Leota	(substituted in) 51'
FL	23	Alafoti Faosiliva	(substituted in) 51'	(substituted off) 72'
Coach:
Stephen Betham

Touch judges:
Wayne Davies (Wales)
Chris Williams (Wales)
Television match official:
Huw Lewis (Wales)

17 November 2012
18:00 WET/GMT+0 (UTC+0)

United States	13–22	Tonga
Try: Shaw 38' c Con: Pangelinan; Pen: Pangelinan 28', 45' (2/4)	Report	Try: Helu 2' m Lilo 59' c Piukala 75' c Con: Lilo (2/3); Pen: Lilo 51' (1/3)

Eirias Stadium, Colwyn Bay, Wales
Referee: Lourens van der Merwe (South Africa)

FB	15	Zach Pangelinan
RW	14	Cornelius Dirksen
OC	13	Paul Emerick
IC	12	Andrew Suniula
LW	11	Luke Hume
FH	10	Toby L'Estrange
SH	9	Robbie Shaw
N8	8	Todd Clever (c)
OF	7	John Quill
BF	6	Scott LaValla
RL	5	Louis Stanfill
LL	4	Brian Doyle
TP	3	Eric Fry
HK	2	Chris Biller
LP	1	Shawn Pittman
Replacements:
HK	16	Derek Asbun
PR	17	Nicholas Wallace
WG	18	Zach Pangelinan
FL	19	Inaki Basauri
FL	20	Peter Dahl
SH	21	Mike Petri
CE	22	Roland Suniula
FH	23	Gearoid McDonald
Coach:
Mike Tolkin

FB	15	Vunga Lilo
RW	14	Viliami Helu
OC	13	Suka Hufanga
IC	12	Sione Piukala
LW	11	Fetuʻu Vainikolo
FH	10	Fangatapu Apikotoa
SH	9	Taniela Moa
N8	8	Viliami Maʻafu
OF	7	Nili Latu (c)
BF	6	Steve Mafi
RL	5	Lua Lokotui
LL	4	Joseph Tuineau
TP	3	Halani Aulika
HK	2	Elvis Taione
LP	1	Alisona Taumalolo
Replacements:
HK	16	Ilaisia Ma'asi
PR	17	Kisi Pulu
PR	18	Tevita Mailau
FL	19	Hale T-Pole
SH	20	Joshua Afu
FH	21	Viliame Iongi
WG	22	Edmond Paea
WG	23	Alipate Fatafehi
Coach:
Mana Otai

Touch judges:
Tim Hayes (Wales)
Wayne Davies (Wales)
Television match official:
Paul Adams (Wales)

17 November 2012
20:00 WET/GMT+0 (UTC+0)

Canada	35–3	Russia
Try: Hassler 19' c, 57' c Paris 42' c Blevins 44' m Con: Pritchard (3/4); Pen: Pritchard 4', 10', 33' (3/4)	Report	Pen: Klyuchnikov 8' (1/3)

Eirias Stadium, Colwyn Bay, Wales
Referee: Francisco Pastrana (Argentina)

FB	15	James Pritchard
RW	14	Jeff Hassler
OC	13	Ciaran Hearn
IC	12	Nick Blevins
LW	11	Taylor Paris
FH	10	Harry Jones
SH	9	Eric Wilson
N8	8	Aaron Carpenter (c)
OF	7	Chauncey O'Toole
BF	6	Tyler Ardron
RL	5	Tyler Hotson
LL	4	Jebb Sinclair
TP	3	Jason Marshall
HK	2	Ryan Hamilton
LP	1	Andrew Tiedemann
Replacements:
PR	16	Hubert Buydens
HK	17	Ray Barkwill
PR	18	Doug Wooldridge
LK	19	Jon Phelan
CE	20	Phil Mackenzie
FL	21	Nanyak Dala
SH	22	Phil Mack
FH	23	Connor Braid
Coach:
(New Zealand) Kieran Crowley

FB	15	Igor Klyuchnikov
RW	14	Denis Simplikevich
OC	13	Vasily Artemyev
IC	12	Dmitry Gerasimov
LW	11	Vladimir Ostroushko
FH	10	Sergey Sugrobov
SH	9	Alexey Shcherban
N8	8	Victor Gresev
OF	7	Pavel Butenko
BF	6	Andrey Temnov
RL	5	Kirill Kulemin
LL	4	Alexander Voytov (c)
TP	3	Evgeny Pronenko
HK	2	Valery Tsnobiladze
LP	1	Gregory Tsnobiladze
Replacements:
HK	16	Vladislav Korshunov
PR	17	Alexey Volkov
PR	18	Innokenty Zykov
FL	19	Andrey Garbuzov
FH	20	Ramil Gysin
SH	21	Gleb Babkin
FL	22	Yuri Vengerov
CE	23	Sergey Trishin
Coach:
(Wales) Kingsley Jones

Touch judges:
Tim Hayes (Wales)
Wayne Davies (Wales)
Television match official:
Paul Adams (Wales)

== Sponsorship ==
The competition is funded by the International Rugby Board and supported by the Welsh Rugby Union (WRU) and Conwy County Borough Council.

== See also ==
- List of international rugby union teams
- IRB International Rugby Series
