= Lokotui =

Lokotui is a surname. Notable people with the surname include:

- Fotu Lokotui (born 1992), Tongan rugby union player
- Tukulua Lokotui (born 1979), New Zealand rugby union player
