= William Helu =

Tongan rugby union player

- Born: Viliami F.U.A. Helu; 19 April 1986 (age 40) Ōtāhuhu, New Zealand
- Height: 6 ft 1 in (1.85 m)
- Weight: 97.5 kg (15 st 5 lb; 215 lb)
- School: Wellington College

Rugby union career
- Position(s): Wing, Centre
Senior career
Years	Team	Apps	(Points)
2008–2009	USA Limoges	18	(20)
2009–2010	FC Grenoble	20	(10)
2010–2011	Rugby Roma Olimpic	7	(5)
2011–2012	Bristol Rugby	16	(50)
2012–2013	Manly RUFC	6	(10)
2013–2015	Wasps RFC	28	(70)
2015–2017	Edinburgh Rugby	14	(20)
2017–2018	Timișoara Saracens	6	(20)
International career
Years	Team	Apps	(Points)
2010–	Tonga	23	(35)
- Correct as of 9 October 2015

William Helu (born 19 April 1986) is a Tongan rugby union player. His usual position is on the wing or at centre. He is part of the Tonga national rugby union team and was part of the 2011 Rugby World Cup.

Helu was part of the Tongan squad that defeated France in the pool games at the 2011 Rugby World Cup in New Zealand. He signed with Bristol on a two-year deal but chose to leave the club for personal reasons after the 2011–2012 season.

He was part of the squad that beat Scotland 21–15 at Pittodrie in 2012. In 2013 he signed with London Wasps together with Taione Vea. where he quickly made a name for himself in the aviva premiership and European Challenge cup. He had some impressive performances for the club which was recognised by his peers and was voted the award for London Wasps players player award for the 2013–2014 season. He played in the 2013 Pacific Nations Cup. In 2015 he was part of the World Cup hosted in the United Kingdom where he played in 3 games.

Helu signed a two-year deal with Edinburgh in 2015.
