= Emosi =

Emosi is a masculine given name. Notable people with the name include:

- Emosi Kauhenga (born 1981), Tongan rugby union player
- Emosi Koloto (born 1965), Fijian rugby union and rugby league player
- Emosi Vucago (born 1983), Fijian rugby union player
