= Apisai Naikatini =

Fijian rugby union player

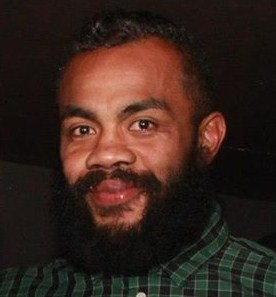
- Born: Apisai Namata Naikatini; 4 April 1985 (age 41) Nadi, Fiji
- Height: 1.96 m (6 ft 5 in)
- Weight: 115 kg (18 st 2 lb)

Rugby union career
- Position(s): Lock, Blindside Flanker
- Current team: Old Glory DC
Amateur team(s)
Years	Team	Apps	(Points)
2006–07	Northern United RFC		
2017–18	Johnsonville RFC		
Senior career
Years	Team	Apps	(Points)
2010–2013	Toyota Verblitz	4	(0)
2013–2014	CA Brive	4	(0)
2014	SU Agen		
2016–17	R.C. Aubenas Vals		
2019	Seattle Seawolves	18	(5)
2020–	Old Glory DC	26	(10)
2020–	→ London Royals (loan)		
- Correct as of 28 April 2022
Provincial / State sides
Years	Team	Apps	(Points)
2006–2013	Wellington	39	(20)
2019	Waikato		
- Correct as of 26 October 2013
Super Rugby
Years	Team	Apps	(Points)
2011–2012	Hurricanes	4	(0)
International career
Years	Team	Apps	(Points)
2012–14	Fiji	18	(5)
- Correct as of 29 June 2014

Apisai Namata Naikatini (born 4 April 1985) is a Fijian rugby union footballer. He plays lock and blindside flank for Fiji and Old Glory DC of Major League Rugby (MLR) in the United States.

== Early life ==
Naikatini attended the prestigious Marist Brothers High School and Natabua High School in Fiji, and Wanganui City College while playing in New Zealand.

== Club career ==
In 2007, he joined NZ provincial side Wellington for the 2007 Air New Zealand Cup. He made his provincial debut on 31 August against Counties Manukau at Blindside Flank. He helped his team reach the final. The following year, he was also instrumental in taking the team to the final but losing this time to Canterbury and then again in 2009. He made his Super Rugby debut coming on the bench in 2009 against the Cheetahs. He also played for the Hurricanes Development side in the Pacific Rugby Cup in 2011. He was also part of the Ranfurly Shield winning team. He joined Japanese side Toyota Verblitz at the end of 2012.

He helped his Wellington side to the 2013 ITM Cup final but lost to Canterbury.

=== France ===
In December 2013, he signed a short-term deal with French Top 14 side, Brive for the remainder of the 2013–14 Top 14 season, filling in for lock, Olivier Caisso who is fighting Hodgkin's lymphoma.

After his short stint, he joined another top 14 team, Agen the following season. He spent the 2016–17 season with Rugby Club Aubenas Vals in Fédérale 1. After this he returned to New Zealand to play club rugby with Johnsonville RFC.

=== United States ===
On 17 January 2019, he joined recently established American Major League Rugby outfit the Seattle Seawolves. He then moved across the country to Old Glory DC for the 2020 season.

== International career ==
Naikatini played 18 matches for Fiji between 2012 and 2014. He made his international debut for Fiji against Japan in the 2012 IRB Pacific Nations Cup at lock. He scored his first try a year later against Japan in the 2013 IRB Pacific Nations Cup.

He was initially named in Fiji's extended squad for the 2015 World Cup but was then assigned to non-traveling reserve status.

== Honours ==
=== Fiji ===
- Pacific Nations Cup: 2013
