= Aporosa Kenatale =

- Born: 12 April 1990 (age 36) Tavua, Fiji
- Height: 5 ft 9 in (175 cm)
- Weight: 161 lb (73 kg)

Rugby union career
- Position: Scrum-half
International career
Years	Team	Apps	(Points)
2013	Fiji	1	(0)

Aporosa Kenatale (born 12 April 1990) is a Fijian former rugby union international.

Kenatale was born in Tavua and educated at Ratu Kadavulevu School, Lodoni.

A scrum-half, Kenatale played for Suva in the Skipper Cup and was capped once for Fiji, as a substitute in an away Test against Canada at Twin Elm Rugby Park in the 2013 IRB Pacific Nations Cup.

Kenatale is the younger brother of Fiji international Nemia Kenatale.

== See also ==
- List of Fiji national rugby union players
