= Saula Radidi =

Fijian rugby union footballer (born 1984)

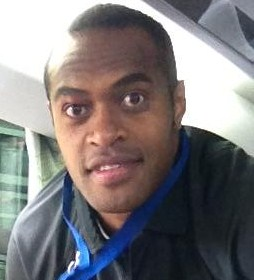
- Born: Saula Radidi; June 4, 1984 (age 42) Nausori, Fiji
- Height: 1.93 m (6 ft 4 in)
- Weight: 103 kg (16 st 3 lb)

Rugby union career
- Position: Centre
- Current team: Knights
International career
Years	Team	Apps	(Points)
2008-Present	Fiji	3	(5)

Saula Radidi (born 4 June 1984 in Nausori, Fiji) is a Fijian rugby union footballer. He plays as a centre for the Fijian national team. He was selected to represent Fiji against Australia during the 2010 June tours.

He has played his rugby both in Fiji and in New Zealand. His test debut was against the New Zealand Maori and took place at the Churchill Park stadium in Lautoka. He was part of the 2013 IRB Pacific Nations Cup winning side.

In June 2010 he was suspended for two matches for dangerous tackling.
