= Adam Siddall =

New Zealand–born American rugby union player (born 1988)

- Born: July 27, 1988 (age 38) Auckland, New Zealand
- Height: 6 ft 0 in (183 cm)
- Weight: 209 lb (95 kg)
- School: King's College, Auckland
- Occupation: Solicitor

Rugby union career
- Position: Fly-half
International career
Years	Team	Apps	(Points)
2013–14	United States	8	(52)

Adam Siddall (born July 27, 1988) is a New Zealand–born American former rugby union international.

Siddall, born in Auckland, New Zealand, was a U.S. citizen at birth due to American ancestry. He was educated at Auckland's King's College and obtained a law degree from the University of Auckland.

After moving to New York to play for Old Blue RFC, Siddall was called up by the United States for the 2013 Pacific Nations Cup, making his Test debut as a fullback against Canada in Toronto. He switched to fly-half for the 2013 end-of-year internationals and in the match against Georgia kicked a last-minute penalty, from 40 metres out, to give the U.S. their first win of the year. Concussion problems limited him to two capped matches in 2014, which included a Test against the All Blacks, before Siddall made the decision to step away from the game on doctors advice.

== See also ==
- List of United States national rugby union players
