= Jiuta Lutumailagi =

- Full name: Jiuta Beletinikoloni Lutumailagi
- Born: 3 June 1984 (age 42)
- Height: 5 ft 7 in (170 cm)
- Weight: 198 lb (90 kg)

Rugby union career
- Position: Fly-half
International career
Years	Team	Apps	(Points)
2013	Fiji	3	(2)
Medal record
Rugby sevens
World Games
Gold medal – first place	2009 Kaohsiung	Men's tournament
Pacific Mini Games
Silver medal – second place	2009 Cook Islands	Men's tournament

Jiuta Beletinikoloni Lutumailagi (born 3 June 1984) is a Fijian former rugby union international.

Lutumailagi, a Fijian IRB Sevens World Series representative, was in the sevens team which claimed a silver medal at the 2009 Pacific Mini Games in the Cook Islands. He played his rugby mainly as a fly-half and gained three caps for the Flying Fijians in 2013, as a substitute against Japan and Canada during the Pacific Nations Cup, then as the starting fly-half in Fiji's win over the Classic All Blacks, a match celebrating the Fiji Rugby Union centenary.

After switching codes, Lutumailagi was a Fiji rugby league nines representative at the 2015 Pacific Games.

== See also ==
- List of Fiji national rugby union players
