= Eric Wilson (rugby union) =

Canada international rugby union player

- Born: April 27, 1983 (age 43)
- Height: 5 ft 7 in (170 cm)
- Weight: 180 lb (82 kg)
- University: University of British Columbia
- Occupation: Firefighter

Rugby union career
- Position: Scrum-half
International career
Years	Team	Apps	(Points)
2012	Canada	2	(0)

Eric Wilson (born April 27, 1983) is a Canadian former international rugby union player.

Wilson, a firefighter by profession, played his club rugby for Vancouver club Meraloma and was the British Columbia Rugby Union's 2009 Player of the Year. He played representative rugby with the BC Bears and competed for Canada West in the short-lived North America 4 competition.

In 2012, Wilson was called up to replace scrum-half Phil Mack in the national team for a series of Test matches in Colwyn Bay, Wales. He made his debut off the bench against Samoa and gained a second cap as the starting scrum-half in Canada's win over Russia, with Sean White out injured.

== See also ==
- List of Canada national rugby union players
