= Liam Murphy (rugby union) =

US international rugby union player (born 1988)

- Full name: Liam Óg Murphy
- Born: July 11, 1988 (age 38) New Jersey, United States
- Height: 6 ft 1 in (185 cm)
- Weight: 225 lb (102 kg)
- School: St Munchin's College

Rugby union career
- Position: Back-row
International career
| Years | Team | Apps | (Points) |
| 2013 | United States | 2 | (0) |

Liam Óg Murphy (born July 11, 1988) is an Irish-American former international rugby union player.

Murphy was born in New Jersey to an American mother and Irish father, who came to the United States as a touring musician. Raised in Ennis, County Clare, Murphy attended St Munchin's College and won a Munster Schools Senior Cup title with the school's XV in 2006. He played his senior rugby in Ireland for Young Munster.

A back-row forward, Murphy competed in American rugby with Boston, from where he earned an international call up for the 2013 Pacific Nations Cup. He made his United States debut off the bench, replacing John Quill in a win over Canada in Edmonton, then received a second cap against Japan in Tokyo later in the tournament.

== See also ==
- List of United States national rugby union players
