= Graham Harriman =

US international rugby union player

- Born: February 23, 1987 (age 39)
- Height: 6 ft 5 in (196 cm)
- Weight: 255 lb (116 kg)

Rugby union career
- Position: Lock
International career
Years	Team	Apps	(Points)
2012–13	United States	4	(0)

Graham Harriman (born February 23, 1987) is an American former international rugby union player.

A native of Eden Prairie, Minnesota, Harriman picked up rugby on a study abroad trip to Sweden and then played with the University of Minnesota Duluth varsity team. He played his club rugby for Metropolis, Chicago Griffins and James Bay.

Harriman, a lock, was capped four times for the United States, debuting off the bench in 2012 against Romania in Bucharest. He was starting lock against Fiji during the 2013 Pacific Nations Cup and later that year played a further two Test matches, as well as an uncapped appearance against New Zealand Maori.

== See also ==
- List of United States national rugby union players
