= Daniel Faleafa =

Tongan rugby union player

- Full name: Daniel Tonga Faleafa
- Born: 13 February 1989 (age 37) Auckland, New Zealand
- Height: 1.95 m (6 ft 5 in)
- Weight: 108 kg (17 st 0 lb; 238 lb)
- School: Mount Albert Grammar School

Rugby union career
- Position(s): Lock, Flanker
- Current team: Colomiers
Senior career
Years	Team	Apps	(Points)
2009	Auckland	2	(0)
2009–2012	Northland	22	(10)
2013	Southern Districts	8	(5)
2014	Randwick	3	(0)
2014–2017	Albi	70	(45)
2017–2018	Colomiers	16	(5)
2018-2019	Coventry	12	(0)
2020	Austin Elite		
- Correct as of 22 May 2018
International career
Years	Team	Apps	(Points)
2009	New Zealand U20	3	(0)
2013–2022	Tonga	28	(10)
- Correct as of 18 October 2019

Daniel Tonga Faleafa (born 13 February 1989) is a Tongan rugby union player. He plays in the flanker and occasionally lock position for the Western Sydney Two Blues in the Shute Shield. Faleafa also represented Tonga at international level.

== Early years ==
Daniel Faleafa attended Mt Roskill Grammar School and Mount Albert Grammar School in Auckland. He played for the New Zealand national schoolboy rugby union team in 2007.

== Playing career ==
Daniel Faleafa is a powerful and athletic backrower who is very adept at playing lock due to his brilliant lineout ability. He started off as a member of the Auckland Rugby Academy and in 2009 was a key member of the New Zealand national under-20 rugby union team that won the 2009 IRB Junior World Championship. Daniel joined Northland in on loan in 2009 where he played 1 ITM Cup game before returning to Auckland to make another 2 ITM Cup appearances that same season. Faleafa joined Northland full-time from 2010 and made 15 appearances over the next three seasons.

Faleafa signed on as Captain of the Western Sydney Two Blues for the 2024 Shute Shield season.

== International career ==
Faleafa is a former New Zealand representative at Secondary School and Under-20 level. In 2013 he was named to play for Tonga in the 2013 IRB Pacific Nations Cup.
