= Tom Dolezel =

Canadian rugby union player

- Born: August 13, 1984 (age 42)
- Height: 6 ft 3 in (1.91 m)
- Weight: 253 lb (115 kg; 18 st 1 lb)

Rugby union career
- Position: Prop
Senior career
Years	Team	Apps	(Points)
2009-2016	Ontario Blues		
2018-2019	Toronto Arrows	9	
- Correct as of 14 June 2019
International career
Years	Team	Apps	(Points)
2009-2016	Canada	16	(5)

Tom Dolezel (born August 13, 1984) is a Canadian rugby union player. Dolezel played internationally for Canada and formerly played Canadian football. He made his debut for Canada in 2009 in a test match against Russia.

Dolezel played briefly for the Calgary Stampeders in the CFL. He played in the qualifiers for the 2015 Rugby World Cup against the United States but did not make the cut for the World Cup squad due to injury.

In 2016, Tom became the head coach of the University of Western Ontario's Men's Rugby team following a season spent as Assistant Coach.

In 2018, Tom debuted with the Ontario Arrows in their first game of the season against the Houston SaberCats.
