= Aisea Natoga =

Fiji international rugby union player (born 1990)

- Full name: Aisea Natoga
- Born: 5 September 1990 (age 36) Fiji
- Height: 188 cm (6 ft 2 in)
- Weight: 91 kg (14 st 5 lb; 201 lb)

Rugby union career
- Position: Winger
- Current team: Ospreys
Senior career
Years	Team	Apps	(Points)
2013–2015	Ospreys	33	(50)
2015–2016	Carcassonne	4	(0)
International career
Years	Team	Apps	(Points)
2012–2013	Fiji	4	(5)
- Correct as of 19 February 2017

Aisea Natoga (born 5 September 1990) is a Fijian rugby union player who played for Ospreys as a winger. He is a Fijian international.

Natoga made his debut for the Ospreys in 2013 having previously played for Aberavon RFC and Neath RFC.
