= Taione Vea =

Tonga international rugby union player

- Born: Taione Vea; 1 December 1988 (age 37) Auckland, New Zealand
- Height: 1.89 m (6 ft 2 in)
- Weight: 126 kg (19 st 12 lb)
- School: Westlake Boys High School
- Occupation: Former Professional Rugby Player

Rugby union career
- Position: Prop
Senior career
Years	Team	Apps	(Points)
2013–2014	Wasps	16	(5)
2014–2015	London Welsh	23	(10)
2015–2016	Newcastle Falcons	24	(5)
Provincial / State sides
Years	Team	Apps	(Points)
2010–2013	North Harbour	16	(0)
International career
Years	Team	Apps	(Points)
2013	Tonga	6	(0)

Taione Vea (born 1 December 1988) is a former Tonga rugby union player who most recently played for Newcastle Falcons in the Aviva Premiership, and represented the Tonga national team on six occasions in 2013.

== Club career ==
Vea first joined the New Zealand outfit North Harbour, in 2010 to compete in the ITM Cup campaigns. After three years, he moved to England as he was signed by Wasps ahead of the 2013–14 season. On 11 June 2014, Vea signed for newly promoted side London Welsh ahead of the 2014–15 season. On 17 March 2015, Vea signed for Newcastle Falcons for the upcoming 2015–16 season. Due to a serious spinal injury he suffered during the Aviva Premiership game against Sale Sharks on 2 September 2016, Vea was unfortunately forced to retire from rugby.

== International career ==
Vea made his international debut for Tonga, where he started in the 2013 IRB Pacific Nations Cup defeating Japan 27–17. His last test appearance came to the 2013 Autumn Internationals where they were defeated by Wales 17–7.

He was selected again for Tonga for the 2014 Autumn Internationals.
