= Nicholas Wallace =

American rugby union player (born 1989)

- Born: 16 October 1989 (age 37) Bellingham, Washington, U.S.
- School: St. Mary's

Rugby union career
- Position: Prop
Amateur team(s)
Years	Team	Apps	(Points)
- Chuckanut Bay RFC
Senior career
Years	Team	Apps	(Points)
2016	Denver Stampede	12	(5)
- Correct as of 28 December 2020
International career
Years	Team	Apps	(Points)
2009	Canada U20	5	(0)
2013–2015	United States	15	(5)
- Correct as of 28 December 2020

Nicholas Wallace (born 16 October 1989) is a former rugby union footballer who played prop for the United States national rugby union team, and the Denver Stampede.

== Youth and early career ==
Wallace played rugby with the Chuckanut rugby club in Ferndale, Washington, the same rugby program that produced U.S. international prop Shawn Pittman. Despite his rugby background, Wallace accepted a scholarship to play American football as a defensive lineman at Western Washington University. Wallace transferred to Saint Mary’s College to play rugby, where he was a four-time Collegiate All-American.

== U.S. national team ==
Wallace was a member of the 2013 Eagles Select XV for the American Rugby Championships in Victoria, British Columbia, Canada.

Wallace earned his first cap for the U.S. national team in a match against Tonga on June 14, 2013. He scored his first international try in the Eagles’ victory against Georgia on November 16, 2013.

Wallace, whose mother is Canadian, had briefly trained with Canada's under-20 national team.

== Club ==
Wallace played for James Bay in Canada’s BC Premier League. Wallace currently plays for Denver in the North American PRO Rugby competition.

== See also ==
- Saint Mary's Gaels#Men's rugby
