= Hendrik Tui =

Japan international rugby union player

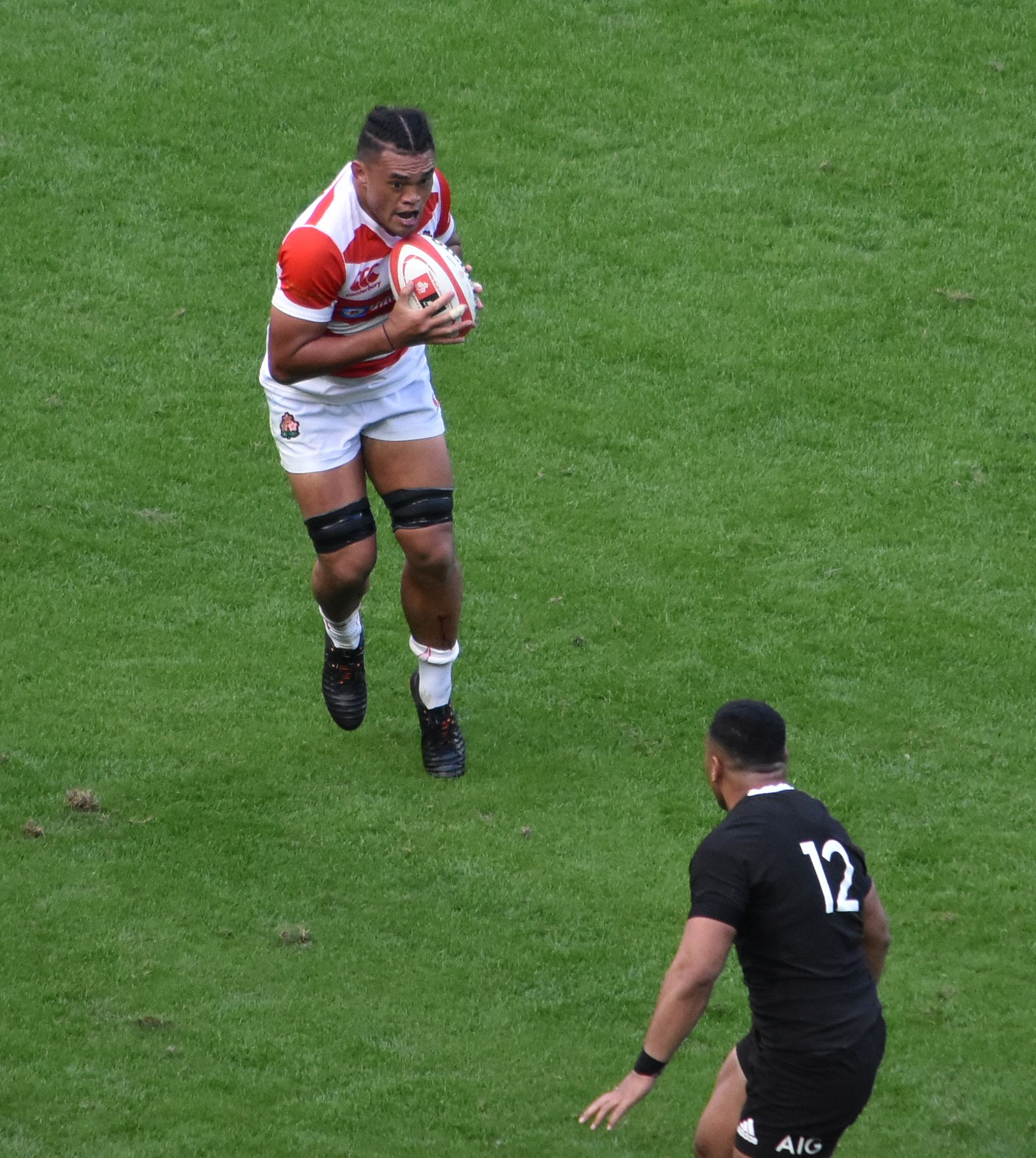
- Full name: Hendrik Tui
- Born: 13 December 1987 (age 38) Auckland, New Zealand
- Height: 1.89 m (6 ft 2 1/2 in)
- Weight: 107 kg (16 st 12 lb; 236 lb)

Rugby union career
- Position: Flanker / Number 8 / Lock / Wing
Senior career
Years	Team	Apps	(Points)
2011–2013	Panasonic Wild Knights	27	(40)
2013–2024	Suntory Sungoliath	149	(205)
2015–2017	Reds	29	(10)
2019	Sunwolves	11	(0)
2024-2026	Urayasu D-Rocks	21	(5)
- Correct as of 21 February 2021
International career
Years	Team	Apps	(Points)
2012–2019	Japan	47	(90)
- Correct as of 21 February 2021

Hendrik Tui (born 13 December 1987) is a Japanese international rugby union player who currently plays as a loose forward for Suntory Sungoliath in the Top League. From 2015 he will represent the Queensland Reds in Super Rugby. He also plays the position of Wing.

== Career ==
Born in New Zealand, Tui is of Samoan descent. He attended De La Salle College, Mangere East, Auckland before going onto university in Japan. Tui has made a name for himself in Japanese rugby, first with the Panasonic Wild Knights, and latterly with Suntory Sungoliath whom he joined in 2013. Some strong showings alongside ex-Wallaby international back-row forward George Smith brought him to the attention of Super Rugby franchise the Queensland Reds, and he was contracted to the Brisbane-based side for the 2015 Super Rugby season.

== International ==
Tui made his international debut for Japan against Tonga in June 2012 and to date has made 25 appearances for his national side and scored 11 tries.
