= Rupeni Nasiga =

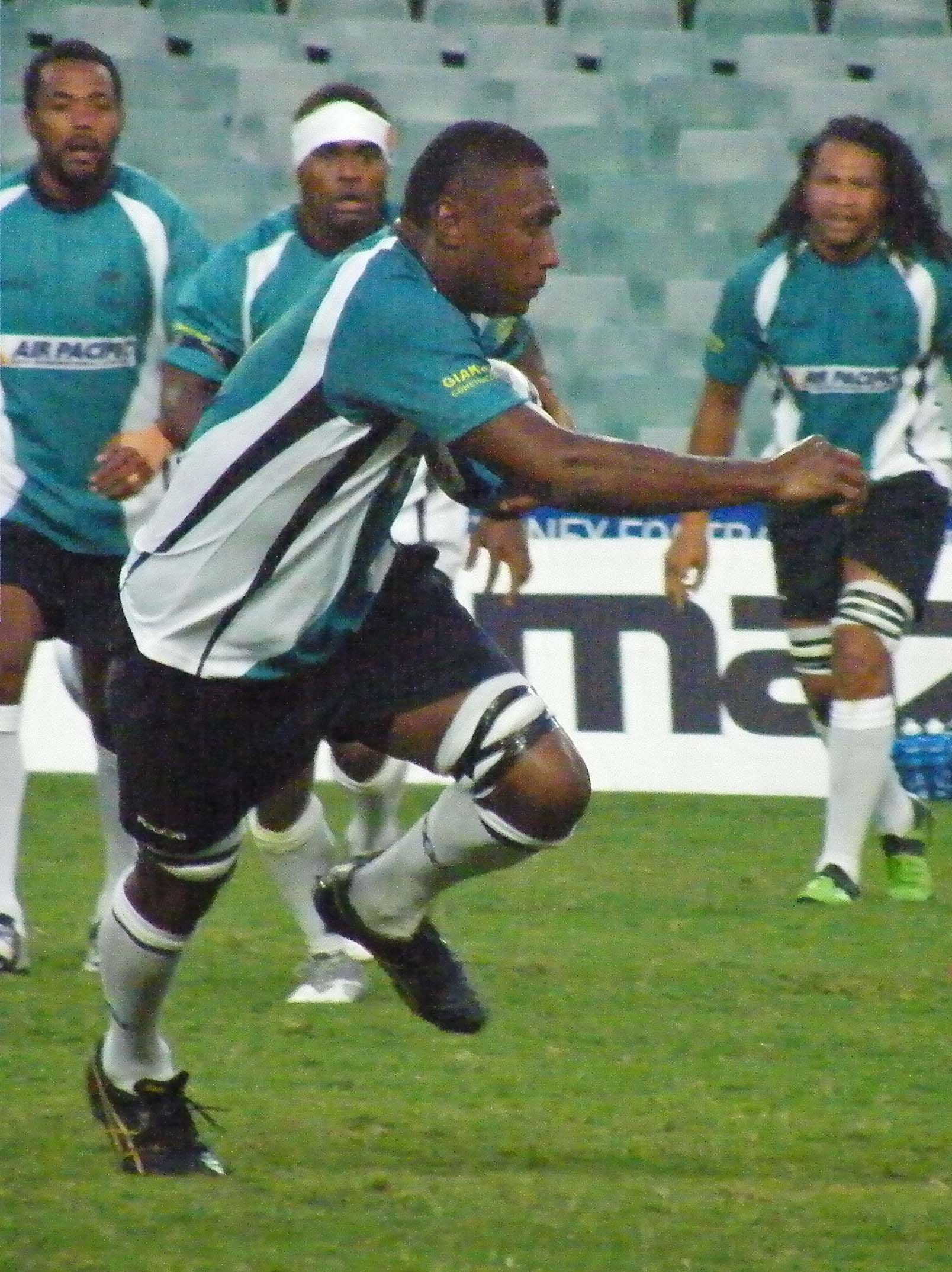
- Born: Rupeni Nasiga; 8 October 1985 (age 41) Sigatoka, Fiji
- Height: 6 ft 6 in (1.98 m)
- Weight: 104 kg (229 lb; 16.4 st)

Rugby union career
- Position: Lock
Senior career
Years	Team	Apps	(Points)
2008	Counties Manukau	4	(0)
2012-2013	Plymouth	15	(5)
- Correct as of 29 June 2014
International career
Years	Team	Apps	(Points)
2008-	Fiji	15	(10)
- Correct as of 29 June 2014

Rupeni Nasiga (born 8 October 1985) is a Fijian rugby union footballer. He currently plays for the Nadroga rugby team and the Fiji national rugby union team and usually plays as a lock. He was part of the Fiji team at the 2011 Rugby World Cup where he played in two matches, he made his international debut in 2008.
