= Masataka Mikami =

Japan international rugby union player (born 1988)

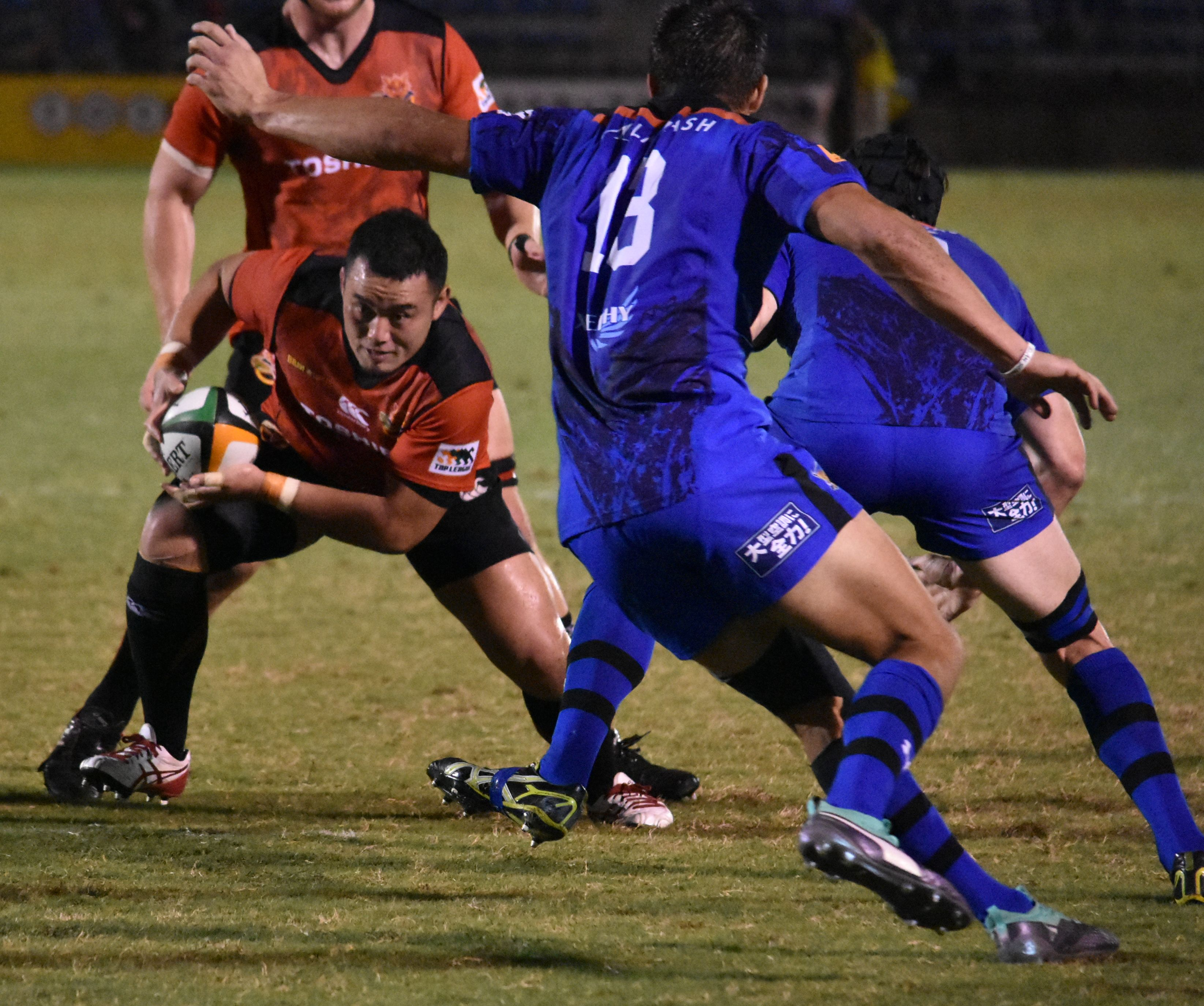
- Mikami in 2018
- Born: 4 June 1988 (age 38) Aomori, Japan
- Height: 1.78 m (5 ft 10 in)
- Weight: 115 kg (18 st 2 lb; 254 lb)
- School: Aomori Technical High School
- University: Tokai University

Rugby union career
- Position: Prop
- Current team: Toshiba Brave Lupus
Senior career
Years	Team	Apps	(Points)
2011–present	Toshiba Brave Lupus	169	(45)
2016–2019	Sunwolves	33	(0)
- Correct as of 21 February 2021
International career
Years	Team	Apps	(Points)
2007–2008	Japan U20	10	(10)
2013–2018	Japan	35	(5)
- Correct as of 21 February 2021

Masataka Mikami (三上 正貴, Mikami Masataka; born 4 June 1988 in Aomori, Japan) is a Japanese rugby union player. He was named in Japan's squad for the 2015 Rugby World Cup.
