= Cameron Pierce (rugby union) =

Canada international rugby union player

- Born: October 26, 1991 (age 35)
- Height: 2.00 m (6 ft 7 in)
- Weight: 105 kg (231 lb)

Rugby union career
- Position: Lock
Amateur team(s)
Years	Team	Apps	(Points)
2011–2013	ASM Clermont Academy		
Senior career
Years	Team	Apps	(Points)
2013–2017	Pau	22	(5)
International career
Years	Team	Apps	(Points)
2011	Canada U20	4	(10)
2013–2017	Canada	3	(0)

Cameron Pierce (born 26 October 1991) is a rugby union lock who plays for Pau and Canada. Pierce made his debut for Canada in 2013.

== Career ==
Following an impressive campaign at the 2011 Junior World Trophy, scoring two tries, Pierce was offered a two-year academy deal with Clermont-Auvergne. From 2011 to 2013 Pierce made appearances for the Clermont Espoirs squad. Ahead of the 2013–14 season, Pierce signed a contract with Pau, playing in the French second division. At the end of the 2014–15 season Pau won promotion to the Top 14, the premier French league. Pierce would continue to play with the club appearing in seven matches for Pau's 2015–16 season. However, despite his contract not expiring until the end of the 2016–17 season, Pierce left the team early citing multiple concussion issues.

Coaching career Rugby Club Libournais: Forwards Coach 2020–2022
