= Shoji Ito =

Japanese rugby union player

- Born: 2 December 1980 (age 45) Kobe, Hyōgo, Japan
- Height: 191 cm (6 ft 3 in)
- Weight: 102 kg (16 st 1 lb)
- School: Hyogo Technical High School
- University: Kyoto Sangyo University

Rugby union career
- Position(s): Lock, Flanker, No.8
Senior career
Years	Team	Apps	(Points)
2003-2009	Ricoh Black Rams	62	(?)
2009-2018	Kobelco Steelers	104	(50)
- Correct as of 16 February 2023
International career
Years	Team	Apps	(Points)
2012-2015	Japan national team	36	(5)
- Correct as of 23 September 2015
Coaching career
- Years: Team
- 2018-2021: Kyoto Sangyo University
- 2021-2025: MIE Honda HEAT (Forwards coach)
- 2025-: Japan national team (Assist coach)

Shoji Ito (伊藤 鐘史, Itō Shōji; born 2 December 1980) is a coach and former Japanese rugby union player. He was named in Japan's squad for the 2015 Rugby World Cup. He is currently the assist coach of the Japan national team.

== Playing career ==
2003-2009 Ricoh Black Rams

2004 International Rugby Academy of New Zealand

2005 Grammar Carlton Rugby Football Club (Auckland, New Zealand)

2009-2018 Kobelco Steelers

2012-2015 Japan national team (・Japan v Wales 2013 ・Rugby World Cup 2015)

== Coaching career ==
2018-2020 Kyoto Sangyo University (Forwards coach)

2020-2021 Kyoto Sangyo University (Head coach)

2021-2025 MIE Honda HEAT (Forwards coach)

2024 JAPAN XV (Assist coach)

2025- Japan national team (Assist coach)
