= Tomasi Palu =

Thomas Palu
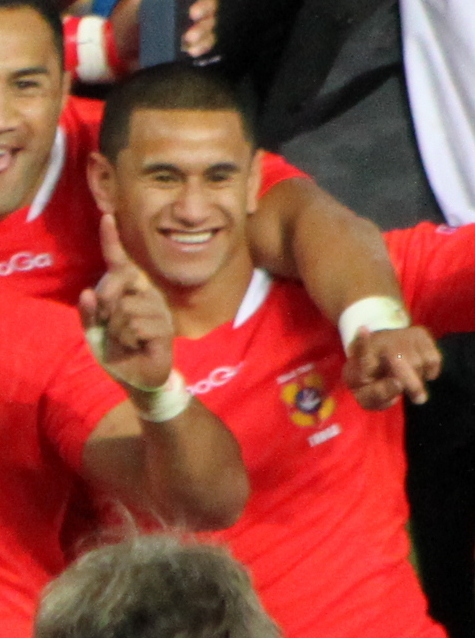
- Born: Tomasi T. Palu; 23 September 1986 (age 40) Wellington, New Zealand
- Height: 5 ft 9 in (1.75 m)
- Weight: 202 lb (14 st 6 lb; 92 kg)
- School: Wellington College

Rugby union career
- Position: Scrum-half
Senior career
Years	Team	Apps	(Points)
2014−15	Doncaster Knights	4	(0)
- Correct as of 28 November 2014
Provincial / State sides
Years	Team	Apps	(Points)
2008,13, 15−	Wellington	31	(15)
- Correct as of 22 October 2016
International career
Years	Team	Apps	(Points)
2011−	Tonga	13	(9)
- Correct as of 26 November 2016

Tomasi Palu (born 23 September 1986) is a Tongan rugby union footballer. His usual position is Scrum-half. He was part of the Tongan squad at the 2011 Rugby World Cup where he played in two matches.
