= Sione Piukala =

- Born: Sione Piukala; 8 June 1985 (age 41) Tonga
- Height: 1.82 m (6 ft 0 in)
- Weight: 105 kg (16 st 7 lb; 231 lb)

Rugby union career
- Position: Centre
- Current team: Perpignan
Senior career
Years	Team	Apps	(Points)
2012–	Perpignan	116	(140)
- Correct as of 5 April 2018
International career
Years	Team	Apps	(Points)
2008–2015	Tonga	19	(15)
- Correct as of 4 October 2015

Sione Piukala (born 8 June 1985) is a rugby union centre who plays for Perpignan and Tonga.

Piukala made his debut for Tonga in 2008 and was part of the Tonga squad at the 2015 Rugby World Cup.
