= Toby L'Estrange =

US international rugby union player

- Born: September 2, 1988 (age 38) Berkeley, California, U.S.
- Height: 5 ft 10 in (1.78 m)
- Weight: 194 lb (88 kg)
- Occupations: Rugby player; teacher

Rugby union career
- Position: Fly-half
Amateur team(s)
Years	Team	Apps	(Points)
2012–2013	NYAC RFC		
Senior career
Years	Team	Apps	(Points)
2014	London Welsh	5	(7)
- Correct as of 22 April 2014
International career
Years	Team	Apps	(Points)
2012–2015	United States	13	(5)
- Correct as of 25 December 2020

Toby L'Estrange (born September 2, 1988) is an Australian-American former rugby union player who played flyhalf for London Welsh and for the United States Eagles.

L'Estrange was supposed to join the U.S. team for the June 2012 tests, but was unable to join the team at that time due to a broken arm. L'Estrange made his debut for the U.S. on November 9, 2012 against Russia, scoring a try in a 40–26 victory for the U.S. L'Estrange started all three matches for the U.S. at flyhalf during the November 2013 tests.

In February 2014 he signed with RFU Championship side London Welsh. L'Estrange appeared five times for the Welsh but sustained a fractured leg and was subsequently released at the end of the season.
