= Doug Wooldridge =

Canada international rugby union player

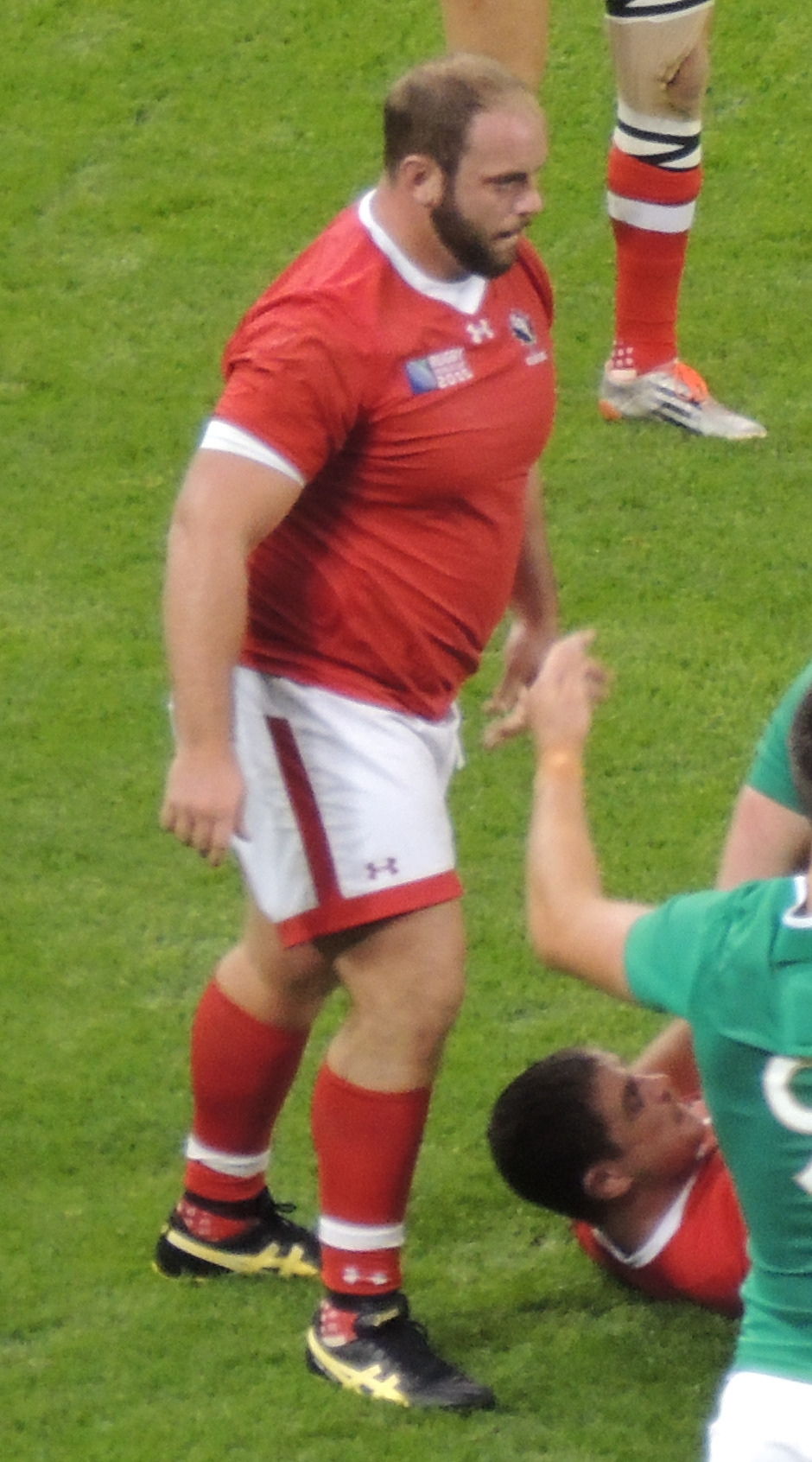
- Wooldridge at the 2015 Rugby World Cup.
- Born: December 19, 1985 (age 40)
- Height: 1.83 m (6 ft 0 in)
- Weight: 125 kg (276 lb; 19 st 10 lb)

Rugby union career
- Position: Prop
Senior career
| Years | Team | Apps | (Points) |
| 2016 | Clermont Auvergne | 1 | (0) |
| 2019- | Toronto Arrows | 1 | (0) |
- Correct as of 6 April 2019
Provincial / State sides
| Years | Team | Apps | (Points) |
| 2009- | Ontario Blues | | |
International career
| Years | Team | Apps | (Points) |
| 2009-Present | Canada | 23 | (0) |

Doug Wooldridge (born 19 December 1985 in Lindsay, Ontario) is a rugby union prop who played for Ontario Blues and Canada. Wooldridge made his debut for Canada in 2009 and was part of the Canada squad at the 2015 Rugby World Cup. Few months after the World Cup, Wooldridge joined ASM Clermont in Top 14 as a medical cover for the Georgian tight head prop, Davit Zirakashvili.
