= Jason Marshall (rugby union) =

Canada international rugby union player

- Born: Jason Marshall; 5 February 1985 (age 41) North Vancouver, British Columbia, Canada
- Height: 1.90 m (6 ft 3 in)
- Weight: 107.9 kg (238 lb)
- School: Carson Graham Secondary
- University: Simon Fraser University

Rugby union career
- Position: Prop
Amateur team(s)
Years	Team	Apps	(Points)
- Capilano RFC
–	James Bay AA		
Senior career
Years	Team	Apps	(Points)
2011-13	Aurillac	37	(0)
2013-14	La Rochelle	5	(0)
2015-	Agen	16	(5)
- Correct as of 26 August 2015
Provincial / State sides
Years	Team	Apps	(Points)
2014	Hawke's Bay	12	(0)
International career
Years	Team	Apps	(Points)
2008-	Canada	31	(15)
- Correct as of 7 September 2015

Jason Marshall (born 5 February 1985) is a Canadian rugby union player. His position is tighthead prop, and he has played 27 tests for the Canada national team. Marshall currently plays for La Rochelle in the Rugby Pro D2. Marshall had previously played rugby in the British Columbia Premiership with Capilano RFC and James Bay Athletic Association, BC Bears in the Canadian Rugby Championship, and Stade Aurillacois Cantal Auvergne in the Rugby Pro D2.

Marshall originally had aspirations of becoming a professional football player as he played as a quarterback with Simon Fraser University and eventually tried out for the Edmonton Eskimos of the Canadian Football League. After being cut from the Eskimos Marshall focused on rugby eventually making the Canada national senior team in 2008.

Marshall competed for Canada at the 2011 Rugby World Cup starting at tighthead prop in all four of Canada's pool matches.
