= Robbie Shaw =

US international rugby union player

- Born: 24 July 1983 (age 43) Taplow, England
- Height: 1.77 m (5 ft 10 in)
- Weight: 89 kg (14 st 0 lb)
- School: RGS High Wycombe
- University: Brunel University

Rugby union career
- Position: Scrum-half
Senior career
Years	Team	Apps	(Points)
2008	Connacht	1	(0)
2010–2011	Bristol	17	(0)
2011–2012	Yorkshire Carnegie	26	(5)
2013–2014	London Scottish	6	(0)
2015–2016	Ohio Aviators	16	(41)
2017	Hartpury College R.F.C.	2	(0)
- Correct as of 7 June 2021
International career
Years	Team	Apps	(Points)
2004	Ireland under-21		
2008–2013	United States	13	(15)
- Correct as of 8 December 2013

Robbie Shaw (born 24 July 1983) is a former international rugby union player who played scrum-half. Shaw played for the United States national rugby union team.

Shaw played for Bristol and was released at the end of the 2010-11 RFU Championship. Shaw joined Bristol after a short stint at Esher. He has also previously played for London Wasps, London Welsh, Connacht and Galwegians. He made one substitute appearance for Connacht on 2 May 2008 against Cardiff Blues.

In July 2011, Welsh region the Scarlets said that Shaw was training with them to be ready for the 2011–12 season. In June 2013 Shaw signed to play for Esher in National League 1. After a three match stint with London Scottish F.C. during the 2013–14 season Shaw returned to Esher for the 2014–15 season.

== International ==
Shaw has twelve international caps for the United States. Shaw narrowly missed out on making the United States squad for the 2011 Rugby World Cup.

Shaw also played for the Ireland U21 side that reached the final of the World Championships in 2004. Shaw is also a United Kingdom citizen.
