= Francisco Pastrana =

Argentinian rugby union referee

- Born: 13 September 1979 (age 47) Buenos Aires, Argentina

Rugby union career
Refereeing career
Years	Competition	Apps
2009–12	IRB Junior World Championship	
2009–	Test Matches	
2013	Super Rugby	

Francisco Pastrana is a Rugby Union referee who represents the Argentine Rugby Union. Until 2003, he played Fly Half for the famous Hindu Club in Buenos Aires till injuries took their toll and forced him to stop playing in 2003.

In 2004, Pastrana started refereeing and now he is a full-time, professional rugby referee, officiating across many test and non-test match globally. His international refereeing started in 2009, when he refereed a match between Kenya under 20s and the United States under 20s in the 2009 IRB Junior World Rugby Trophy. Later in 2009, he refereed a Rugby World Cup qualification mach between Uruguay and the United States. He later touch judged the Rugby World Cup Repechage final between Uruguay and Romania.

In 2010, he was one of many referees to referee a match in the 2010 IRB Junior World Championship, where he would referee the 3rd place play-off between England under 20s and South Africa under 20s. He was once again on the IRB panel for the 2011 and 2012 IRB Junior World Championship.

In 2011, he refereed a home game between Argentina and the French Barbarians but he is yet to referee a Tier 1 match, although he was a touch judge during the 2013 Six Nations Championship.

Francisco Pastrana became the first foreigner to referee a Super Rugby match, being on an 18-man refereeing panel for the 2013 Super Rugby season. His first match was the Australian derby between Melbourne Rebels and Queensland Reds. He was removed from the 2014 Super Rugby refereeing panel after drawing heavy criticism for his performance at the Blues versus Cheetahs match on 22 March.

Despite primarily refereeing 15's Rugby Union, he has at time refereed on the Sevens circuit, playing part in the IRB Sevens World Series.
