= Matt Evans (rugby union) =

Canada international rugby union player

- Born: Matthew Evans; 2 January 1988 (age 38) Salisbury, England
- Height: 183 cm (6 ft 0 in)
- Weight: 89 kg (196 lb)
- School: Shawnigan Lake School
- University: Hartpury College

Rugby union career
- Position: Fly-half / Centre / Fullback
Senior career
Years	Team	Apps	(Points)
2010–2011	Dragons	1	(0)
2010–2011	Newport RFC	15	(35)
2011–2020	Cornish Pirates	68	(75)
International career
Years	Team	Apps	(Points)
2008	Canada U20	5	(10)
2008–2019	Canada	39	(55)
Medal record
Men's rugby sevens
Representing Canada
Pan American Games
Gold medal – first place	2011 Guadalajara	Team competition

Matthew Evans (born 2 January 1988) is a Canadian former rugby union player who most recently played for the Cornish Pirates in the RFU Championship. He is a utility back and has played in various back-line positions including fly-half, centre, wing, and fullback.

Evans competed at the 2008 IRB Junior World Championship representing Canada. He played five games and scored two tries, one versus Scotland and one versus Australia. Evans made his international debut for the Canada senior men's team in 2008 against Ireland at Thomond Park in Limerick.

He joined the Welsh regional team the Newport Gwent Dragons in the Celtic League in June 2010 but was released at the end of the 2010-11 Magners League.

On 8 July 2011 Evans was selected as part of the 30-man Canadian squad for the 2011 Rugby World Cup.

It was reported on 21 October 2011 that Evans would join RFU Championship side the Cornish Pirates as cover for the injured Wes Davies.

On March 9, 2020, Evans hung up his boots, retiring from professional rugby whilst taking on the role of Team Manager for the Cornish Pirates.
