= John Moonlight =

Canadian rugby union player

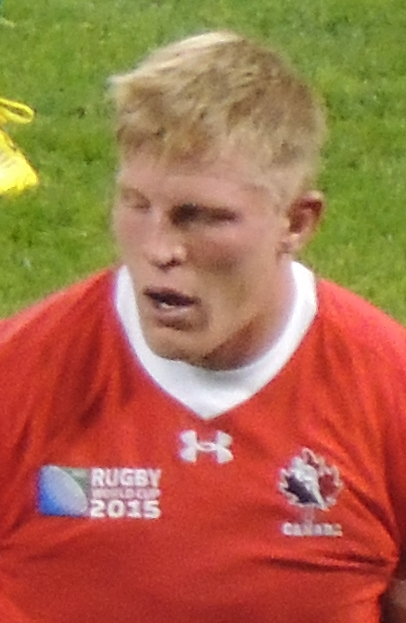
- Moonlight playing for Canada at the 2015RWC
- Born: 2 July 1987 (age 39) Scarborough, Ontario
- Height: 1.87 m (6 ft 2 in)
- Weight: 101 kg (223 lb)

Rugby union career
- Position: Loose forward
Amateur team(s)
| Years | Team | Apps | (Points) |
- Ajax Wanderers / James Bay Athletic Association
Senior career
| Years | Team | Apps | (Points) |
| 2019- 2020 | Toronto Arrows | 8 | (5) |
- Correct as of 9 June 2019
International career
| Years | Team | Apps | (Points) |
| 2009–2018 | Canada 7’s | 65 | (580) |

John Moonlight (born July 2, 1987) is a Canadian rugby union player for the Toronto Arrows of Major League Rugby. Moonlight was formerly a Canadian Rugby 7's player on the HSBC Sevens World Series. Moonlight made his debut for Canada in 2009 in Hong Kong. He has played in 65 World Series tournaments for Canada scoring 116 tries. He has represented Canada at three Commonwealth Games and won 2 Pam-Am Games gold medals. He has also represented Canada in the rugby union 15's code. He has represented Canada 23 times and was part of the Canada squad at the 2015 Rugby World Cup. He retired from international rugby in April 2018 to start a career as a firefighter in his hometown of Pickering.
