= Brian Doyle (rugby union) =

US international rugby union player

- Born: February 28, 1984 (age 42) Rockland, New York, U.S.
- Height: 6 ft 7 in (2.01 m)
- Weight: 245 lb (111 kg)
- Occupation: Professional rugby union player

Rugby union career
- Position: Lock
Senior career
Years	Team	Apps	(Points)
2016	San Diego Breakers	3	(0)
- Correct as of 10 April 2020
International career
Years	Team	Apps	(Points)
2008–2013	United States	15	(5)
- Correct as of 10 April 2020

Brian Doyle (born February 28, 1984, in Concord, California) is a former American rugby union player who last played for the San Diego Breakers and the United States national rugby union team. He played second row.
