= Jon Phelan =

Canada international rugby union player

- Full name: Jonathan Phelan
- Born: January 20, 1986 (age 40)
- Height: 6 ft 8 in (203 cm)
- Weight: 244 lb (111 kg)
- University: McGill University
- Occupation: Engineer

Rugby union career
- Position: Lock
Senior career
Years	Team	Apps	(Points)
2014–16	Doncaster Knights		
International career
Years	Team	Apps	(Points)
2010–15	Canada	23	(0)

Jonathan Phelan (born 20 January 1986) is a Canadian former professional rugby union player.

Raised in Montreal, Phelan played his early rugby with Saint-Anne-de-Bellevue, after picking up the sport while in high school. He was a varsity player at McGill University, where he completed a master's degree in engineering.

Phelan, a 6 ft 8 in lock, got his first national call up while playing with the Rock in St. John's. He was a Canada representative from 2010 to 2015, gaining 23 total caps, during which time he also played professionally in Europe, with a season at French club Lille Métropole and two seasons with Doncaster Knights in England.

== See also ==
- List of Canada national rugby union players
