= Elvis Taione =

Tonga international rugby union player

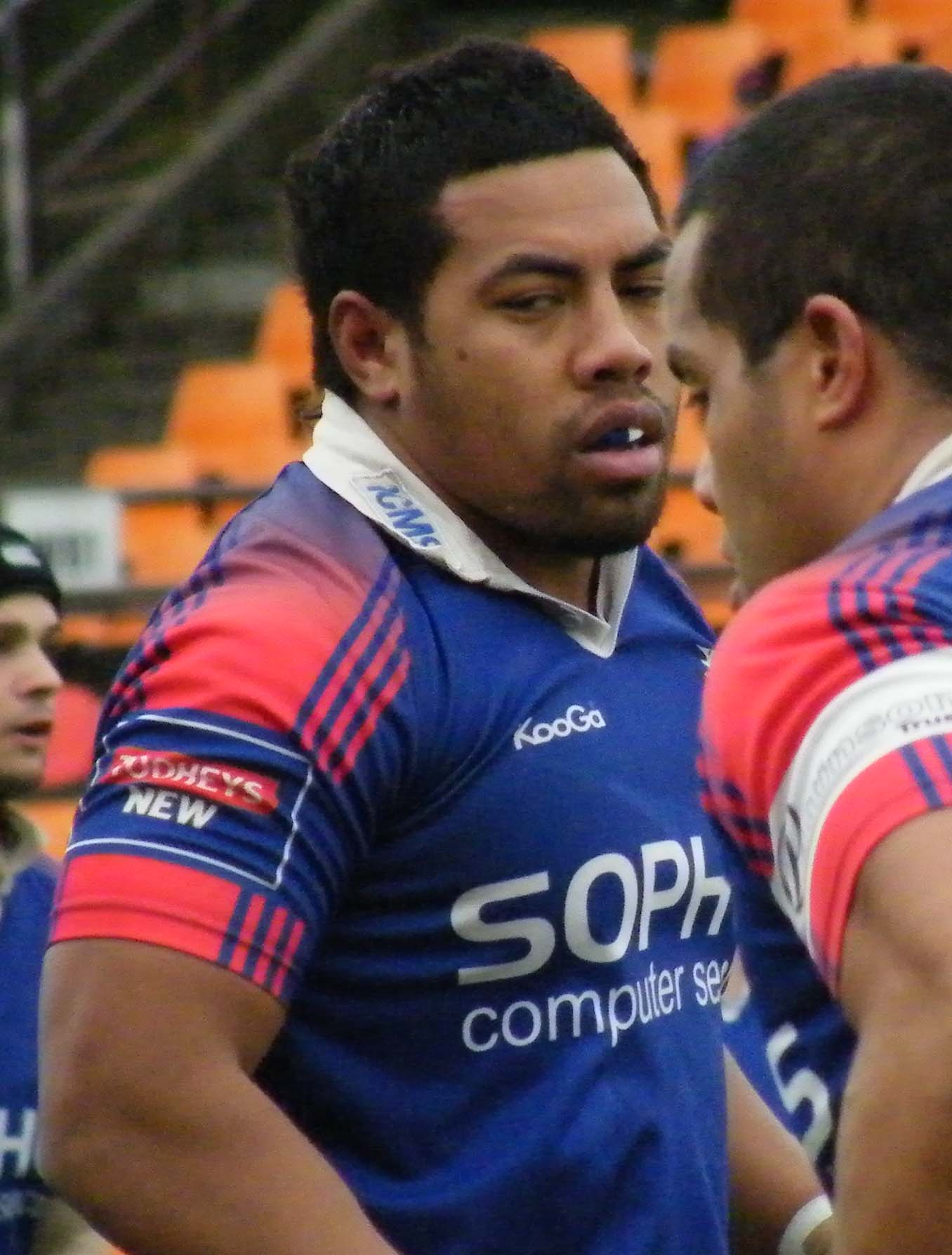
- Born: Elvis Taione; 25 May 1983 (age 43) Nukualofa, Tonga
- Height: 1.80 m (5 ft 11 in)
- Weight: 112 kg (17 st 9 lb; 247 lb)

Rugby union career
- Position: Hooker
Senior career
Years	Team	Apps	(Points)
2013–2014	Jersey Reds	23	(5)
2014−2021	Exeter Chiefs	80	(35)
2021–	Ospreys		
- Correct as of 26 January 2020
Super Rugby
Years	Team	Apps	(Points)
2011	Waratahs	1	(0)
2012	Western Force	6	(0)
- Correct as of 24 August 2015
International career
Years	Team	Apps	(Points)
2012–	Tonga	26	(0)
- Correct as of 19 November 2016

Elvis Taione (born 25 May 1983 in Nukualofa, Tonga) is a rugby union footballer. His regular playing position is hooker. He previously played Super Rugby for the Western Force, Waratahs, Jersey in the RFU Championship and is currently signed to Exeter Chiefs, winning the Aviva Premiership in 2016/17.

Exeter Chiefs signed Taione in March 2014 on a two-year contract. He was named in Tonga's 2015 Rugby World Cup squad.

On 15 June 2021, after seven season with Exeter, Taione would leave to join Welsh region Ospreys in the United Rugby Championship for the 2021–22 season.
