= Peter Dahl (rugby union) =

American rugby union player

- Born: 12 November 1984 (age 42) Christchurch, New Zealand
- Height: 6 ft 2 in (1.88 m)
- Weight: 220 lb (100 kg)
- School: Mount Aspiring College
- University: Otago Polytechnic

Rugby union career
- Position: Flanker
Amateur team(s)
Years	Team	Apps	(Points)
2013–2015	Belmont Shore RFC		
2015–2018	Glendale Raptors		
Senior career
Years	Team	Apps	(Points)
2016	Denver Stampede	10	(5)
2018–2019	Glendale Raptors	21	(15)
- Correct as of 25 February 2021
International career
Years	Team	Apps	(Points)
2009–2013	United States	12	(0)
National sevens team
Years	Team		Comps
2012	United States		1

Peter Dahl (born 12 November 1984) is a New Zealand born American professional rugby union player. He plays as a flanker for Glendale Raptors in Major League Rugby having previously played for the USA Eagles internationally.
