= Luke Hume =

US international rugby union & league footballer

Personal information
- Born: 26 January 1988 (age 38) Sydney, Australia
- Height: 5 ft 9 in (175 cm)
- Weight: 190 lb (86 kg)

Playing information

Rugby league
- Position: Five-eighth, Stand-off
Club
Years	Team	Pld	T	G	FG	P
2009–11	New York Knights	0	0	0	0	0
Representative
Years	Team	Pld	T	G	FG	P
2009–11	United States	0	0	0	0	0

Rugby union
- Position: Wing, Fullback
Club
Years	Team	Pld	T	G	FG	P
2012–13	Old Blue RFC	0	0	0	0	0
2014–14	Narbonne	2				0
2019–21	Rugby United New York	14	2	0	0	10
	Total	16	2	0	0	10
Representative
Years	Team	Pld	T	G	FG	P
2012–16	United States	20	3			15
2012–13	United States 7s	8

Luke Hume (born 26 January 1988), nicknamed the "Bald Eagle", is an American former rugby union and rugby league footballer who plays for the USA Eagles and USA 7s rugby teams. He currently plays Wing and Fullback for Rugby United New York (RUNY) in Major League Rugby (MLR).

Hume also played for French club RC Narbonne in the Pro D2 during the 2013–14 season. He formerly played rugby league with the USA Tomahawks.

== Background ==
Hume was born in Sydney, Australia.

== Rugby league ==
Originally from Sydney, Hume moved to New York City where he began playing rugby league for the New York Knights in the American National Rugby League. In 2009, his first year with the team, he led the Knights to a league championship and was awarded AMNRL MVP. Hume typically played Five-eighth. Hume scored a hat trick and earned man of the match honours in a 38–20 USA Tomahawks victory over the Ireland A side in the Donnybrook Cup. In September 2013, Hume was called up to the Tomahawks World Cup squad but had to withdraw after sustaining a broken leg.

== Rugby union ==
Hume debuted for the Eagles in June 2012 in a loss to Canada during which he scored a try.

Hume played club rugby union for Old Blue in New York.

In rugby sevens, Hume debuted for the U.S. national team in 2012, and helped the USA qualify for the 2013 Rugby World Cup Sevens during the 2012 NACRA Sevens. Hume was signed to a contract by the U.S. national team for 2013.

In August 2013 Hume began playing for Gloucester A as part of a trial, scoring two tries in his first two matches for the A side team. Despite strong performances, Gloucester were unable to sign Hume for the 2013–14 season, but were keen on the possibility of Hume returning for the following season.

In January 2014 Hume signed a contract for RC Narbonne until the end of the season under the 'Medical Joker' rule making two appearances for the side. Hume left Narbonne at the end of his first season with the club, to pursue other opportunities in professional rugby.

== See also ==
- United States national rugby sevens team
