= Ryan Hamilton (rugby union) =

Canada international rugby union player

- Born: Ryan Hamilton; 9 April 1988 (age 38) Edmonton, Alberta
- Height: 182 cm (6 ft 0 in)
- Weight: 104 kg (16 st 5 lb)
- University: Victoria

Rugby union career
- Position: Hooker
Amateur team(s)
Years	Team	Apps	(Points)
- Victoria Vikes
–	Capilano RFC		
Provincial / State sides
Years	Team	Apps	(Points)
- Pacific Tyee
International career
Years	Team	Apps	(Points)
2008	Canada U20	5	(0)
2010-15	Canada	17	(0)
- Correct as of 17 November 2012

Ryan Hamilton (born 9 April 1988) was a Canadian rugby union player. He played internationally for the Canadian national side, making 17 appearances, 4 of which came during the 2011 Rugby World Cup. In addition to the national XV side, Hamilton appeared in all 5 matches in the 2008 IRB Junior World Championship for the Canada U20 side in Wales, in which Canada finished eleventh. Hamilton was born in Edmonton, Alberta.

He played as a hooker for all of his career, making his senior Canada debut in 2010 against Uruguay on June 5, 2010. On 2 April 2015, Hamilton announced his retirement from the game, after ten years with Rugby Canada from the Under 17 level to the Senior Men's Team.
