= Taniela Moa =

Tonga international rugby union player (1985–2021)

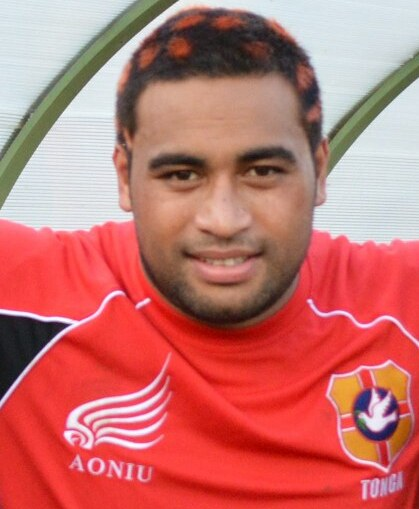
- Moa in 2012
- Born: Taniela Moa; 11 March 1985 Tofoa, Tonga
- Died: 16 December 2021 (aged 36)
- Height: 1.82 m (6 ft 0 in)
- Weight: 102 kg (225 lb)

Rugby union career
- Position(s): Scrum-half, Fly-half
Senior career
Years	Team	Apps	(Points)
2011–17	Section Paloise	89	(45)
- Correct as of 19 December 2019
Provincial / State sides
Years	Team	Apps	(Points)
2005−09	Auckland	58	(55)
2010−11	Bay of Plenty	17	(40)
Super Rugby
Years	Team	Apps	(Points)
2007−10	Blues	27	(25)
2011	Chiefs	4	(0)
International career
Years	Team	Apps	(Points)
2011-2015	Tonga	20	(15)
- Correct as of 23 November 2014

Taniela Moa (11 March 1985 – 16 December 2021) was a Tongan rugby union player. He last played for Section Paloise. He also played for the Blues and Chiefs in Super Rugby, and Auckland and Bay of Plenty in the NPC. His main position was scrum-half but he could also cover the fly-half position.

Moa was born in Tonga before moving to Auckland, where he was educated at Onehunga High School and Southern Cross Campus before finishing his last year at De La Salle College, Mangere East.

He represented the Ikale Tahi at the 2011 Rugby World Cup. He won a total of 20 caps for Tonga.

Moa died at the age of 36 on 16 December 2021.
