= Emosi Kauhenga =

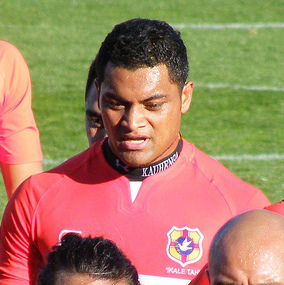
- Born: April 27, 1981 (age 45) Folaha, Tonga
- Height: 1.96 m (6 ft 5 in)
- Weight: 120 kg (265 lb)

Rugby union career
- Position: Lock
Senior career
| Years | Team | Apps | (Points) |
| 2007−2018 | Ricoh Black Rams | 62 | (110) |
- Correct as of 15 January 2017
International career
| Years | Team | Apps | (Points) |
| | Tonga | 5 | |

Emosi Kauhenga (born 27 April 1981 in Folaha, Tonga) is a rugby union footballer. He plays at lock.

In 2007 he was named to Tonga's Rugby World Cup squad. In 2009 he was selected for a team to play Ireland.
