= Shawn Pittman (rugby union) =

American rugby union coach

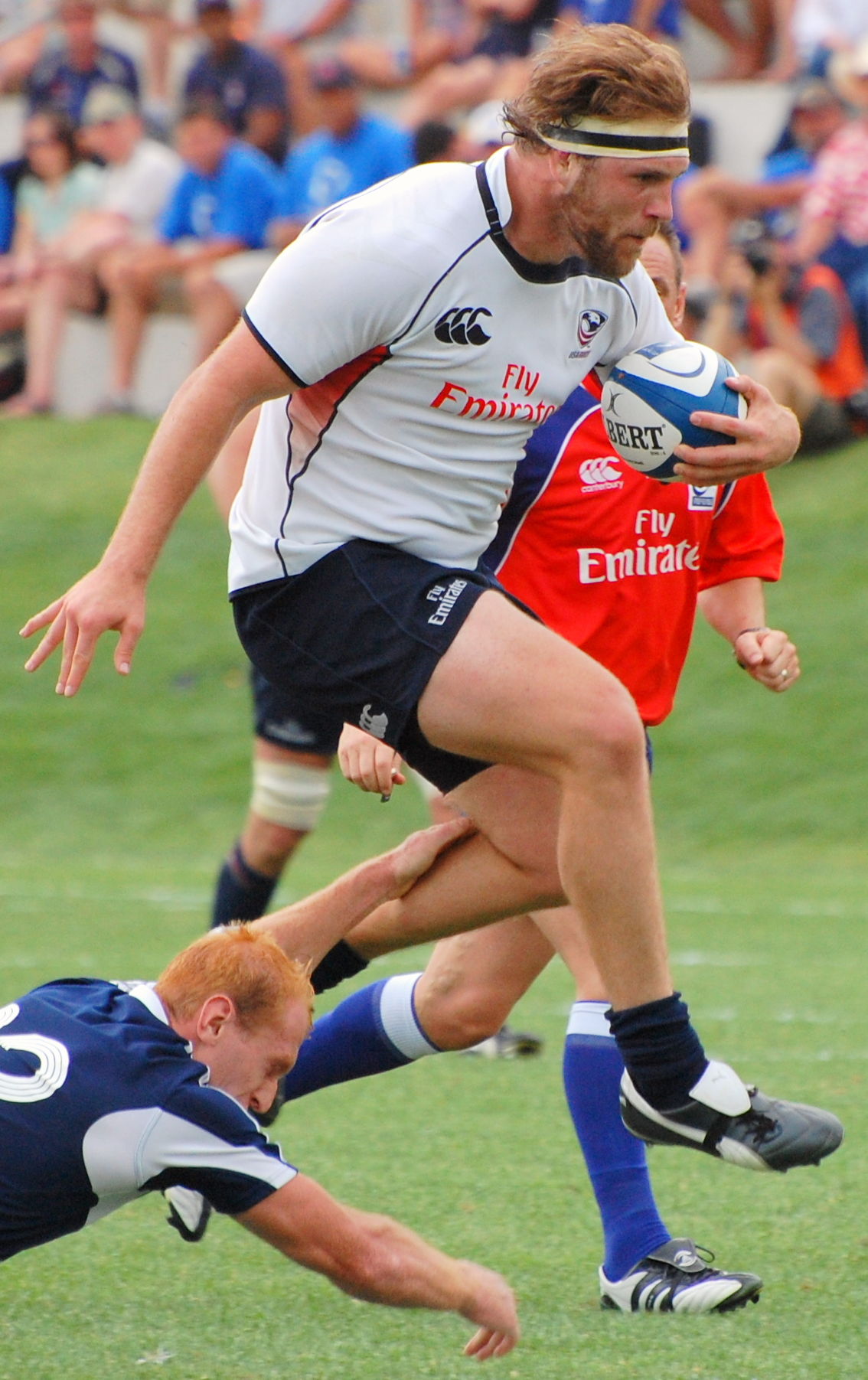
- Born: Shawn Pittman; January 22, 1988 (age 38) Bellingham, Washington, U.S.
- Height: 1.91 m (6 ft 3 in)
- Weight: 118 kg (260 lb; 18.6 st)

Rugby union career
- Position: Prop
Amateur team(s)
Years	Team	Apps	(Points)
- Bayside Sharks
–	Chuckanut Bay RFC		
Senior career
Years	Team	Apps	(Points)
2010–2013	London Welsh	46	(5)
- Correct as of 5 February 2014
International career
Years	Team	Apps	(Points)
2007	United States U19		
2008	United States U20	5	(5)
2008–2013	United States	30	(0)
- Correct as of 31 December 2020
Coaching career
- Years: Team
- United States (asst)
- 2021: Utah Warriors
- Correct as of 19 February 2021

Shawn Pittman (born January 22, 1988) is an American former rugby union player and coach. He played prop for Old Puget Sound Beach and represented the United States Eagles at the 2011 Rugby World Cup. Pittman was with the Utah Warriors from 2019-2022 and finished his stint as the head coach of the program.

He also represented his country at under-19 and under-20 levels. His debut for his country was against Uruguay on November 8, 2008.

== Youth rugby ==
Pittman started playing rugby when he was 18, after being persuaded to take up the sport by some rugby-playing friends.

He first played representative rugby for the U.S. in 2006. He was selected for the U.S. squad for the Under-19 World Junior Championships in Belfast in 2007. Also in 2007, Pittman undertook the International Rugby Academy of New Zealand's Advanced Course at Massey University in Palmerston North, where he met the likes of Grant Fox.

In 2008, Pittman played for the US national under-20 team in the first-ever IRB Junior World Championship in Wales. Pittman played in all five matches and scored two tries in the defeats to Fiji and South Africa.

== Senior and professional rugby ==
Pitman made his senior debut for the U.S. Eagles against Uruguay in November 2008. He also featured against the England Saxons in 2009. He featured in the 2010 Churchill Cup, putting in a man-of-the-match performance in a 39–22 win over Russia.

Pittman joined London Welsh in the summer of 2010 from Canadian side Bayside Sharks, having previously gained Super League experience in the U.S. with Golden Gate. It was a fitting end to his first season in English rugby in which Pittman had been a permanent feature in the Welsh front row, making 29 appearances for the club and scoring one try in the 54-9 play-off win over Bristol at Old Deer Park.

Pittman and the Eagles beat Russia 32-25 to clinch the 2011 Churchill Cup Bowl at Sixways in England in June. Pittman played in all four U.S. matches in the 2011 Rugby World Cup in New Zealand, starting in two.

Pittman’s last appearances for the U.S. were in August 2013, starting in a pair of matches against Canada. Pittman struggled with concussion issues, before announcing his retirement from rugby in September 2014.

== Coaching career ==
2016 - USA Men's U20's Assistant Coach

2017 - Current USA Rugby Men's National Team Assistant Coach. Shawn joined the Eagles as an Assistant Coach in 2017 with the changeover in head coach from John Mitchell to Gary Gold. Pittman was a part of the staff that lead the USA to the 2019 RWC.

In 2019 Pittman joined the Utah Warriors as an Assistant Coach. In 2021, Shawn took over as interim head coach and was named Major League Rugby Coach of the Year for the 2021 season. After the season, he was named head coach heading into the 2022 season.

Pittman is currently a Firefighter in Snohomish County and has retired from professional coaching.
