= Sean White (rugby union) =

Canadian rugby union player (born 1988)

- Born: June 28, 1988 (age 38) Victoria, British Columbia, Canada
- Height: 1.80 m (5 ft 11 in)
- Weight: 85 kg (187 lb; 13.4 st)

Rugby union career
- Position(s): Scrum-half, Full back, Utility back
Senior career
Years	Team	Apps	(Points)
- BC Bears
International career
Years	Team	Apps	(Points)
2008–2016	Canada	27	(10)

Sean White (born June 28, 1988) is a Canadian rugby union player. He plays as a scrum-half for the Canada national rugby union team. He made his debut for Canada against Japan in 2009.

White was included in the 2011 Rugby World Cup squad for Canada. White also played 32 tournaments on the World Rugby circuit from 2008 to 2016.
