= Tukulua Lokotui =

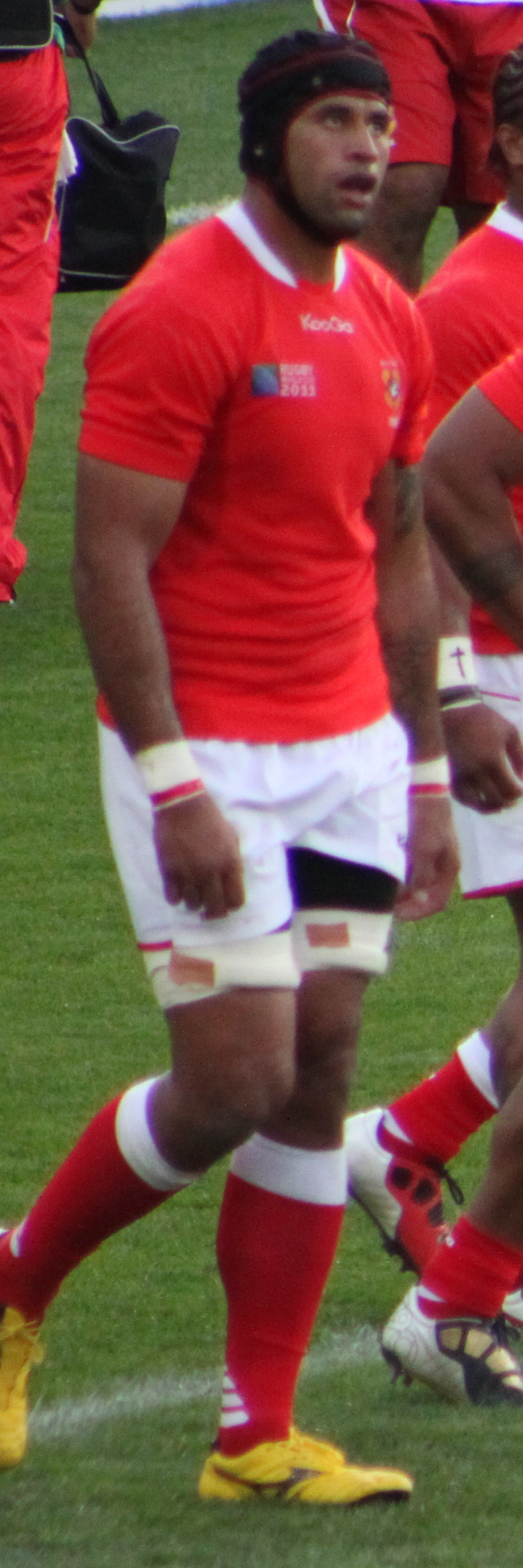
- Born: Tukulua Alukutua Lokotui; 31 December 1979 (age 46) Auckland, New Zealand
- Height: 6 ft 5 in (1.96 m)
- Weight: 253 lb (115 kg)

Rugby union career
- Position: Lock
- Current team: AS Beziers Herault
Senior career
Years	Team	Apps	(Points)
2008	Stade Français	8	(0)
2008−12	Kintetsu Liners	20	(15)
2012	Wellington	7	(0)
2013−14	Gloucester	17	(0)
2014−18	Béziers	86	(10)
Provincial / State sides
Years	Team	Apps	(Points)
2006−07	Hawke's Bay	11	(10)
International career
Years	Team	Apps	(Points)
2001-	Tonga	28	(15)
- Correct as of 9 October 2015

Tukulua Lokotui (born 31 December 1979) is a rugby union footballer who played at lock for Béziers. Lokotui played for Tonga at the 2011 and the 2015 Rugby World Cup squads.

In 2013 Lokotui was cited for a dangerous tackle on Dave Attwood when Bath defeated Gloucester. He was also named in Tonga's squad for their end of the year tour of Asia and Europe.
