= 2016 June rugby union tests =

The 2016 mid-year rugby union internationals (also known as the summer internationals in the Northern Hemisphere) are international rugby union matches that were mostly played in the Southern Hemisphere during the June international window.

The matches were part of World Rugby's global rugby calendar (2012–19) that included Test matches between the touring Northern Hemisphere nations and the home Southern Hemisphere nations, whilst some of the touring teams played mid-week matches against provincial or regional sides. In addition to this, the global calendar gave Tier 2 nations the opportunity to host Tier 1 nations outside the November international window, intended to increase competitiveness from the Tier 2 sides.

All Six Nations teams were in action. The grand slam winners England played a three-test series against Rugby Championship champions Australia. South Africa hosted a three-test series against Ireland, while Wales toured New Zealand, where they played the a three-test series against the world champions, and played a mid-week match against the Chiefs. Wales also played a single match against England for the Old Mutual Wealth Cup before travelling to New Zealand. Argentina hosted Italy, before they played a two-test series against France, whilst Italy played Canada and the United States.

2019 World Cup hosts Japan hosted Scotland for a two-test series, whilst they also played away to Canada in a first ever rugby union Test match at BC Place. Russia toured North America for the first time sonce 2010, playing tests against both Canada and the United States.

Georgia traveled to the Pacific Islands, where Fiji and Samoa each hosted the Lelos for the first time; Georgia also faced Tonga at a neutral venue in Fiji. Brazil hosted Kenya, the first time Brazil had hosted an African nation.

== Overview ==
=== Series ===
Event	Result	Winners
Argentina v France test series	1–1	Drawn
Australia v England test series	0–3	England
Japan v Scotland test series	0–2	Scotland
South Africa v Ireland test series	2–1	South Africa
South Africa A v England Saxons series	0–2	England A
New Zealand v Wales test series	3–0	New Zealand
Uruguay v Fiji Warriors series	0–2	Fiji Warriors

=== Other tours ===
Team/Tour	Opponents
Italy tour	Argentina (lost) – United States (won) – Canada (won)
Georgia tour	Samoa (draw) – Tonga (won) – Fiji (won)
Russia tour	Canada (lost) – United States (lost)

== Fixtures ==
14 May 2016
15:30 UYT (UTC-03)

Uruguay	28–42	Fiji Warriors
Try: Kessler 19' c Arboleya 59' m Freitas 73' m Silva 80' c Con: M. Secco (2/4) 20', 80'	Report (In Spanish)	Try: Vularika 8' c Penalty try 45' c Ucutabua 63' c Raiyala 66' m Ratu 77' c Con: Vularika (3/4) 8', 63', 78'; Pen: Vularika (2/3) 35', 39'

Estadio Charrúa, Montevideo
Referee: Joaquín Montes (Uruguay)

Team details

FB	15	Rodrigo Silva
RW	14	Nicolás Freitas
OC	13	Joaquín Prada
IC	12	Andrés Vilaseca
LW	11	Sebastían Schroeder
FH	10	Martín Secco
SH	9	Guillermo Lijtenstein
N8	8	Alejandro Nieto
OF	7	Gonzalo Campomar
BF	6	Juan Manuel Gaminara (c)
RL	5	Diego Magno
LL	4	Ignacio Dotti
TP	3	Carlos Arboleya
HK	2	Germán Kessler
LP	1	Facundo Gattas
Replacements:
PR	16	Mateo Sanguinetti
PR	17	Diego Arbelo
HK	18	Ignacio Secco
LK	19	Mathias Palomeque
FL	20	Fernando Bascou
FL	21	Gonzalo Soto
CE	22	Facundo Klappenbach
WG	23	Santiago Martinez
Coach:
(Uruguay) Esteban Meneses

FB	15	Cyril Reece
RW	14	Lepani Raiyala
OC	13	Saimoni Tuilaucala
IC	12	Frederick Hickes
LW	11	Nacani Wakaya
FH	10	Seru Vularika
SH	9	Henry Seniloli
N8	8	Eremasi Radrodo
OF	7	Mosese Voka
BF	6	Johnny Dyer
RL	5	Mataiasi Ucutabua
LL	4	Joseva Levula
TP	3	Mesake Doge
HK	2	Jale Sessen
LP	1	Peni Ravai (c)
Replacements:
HK	16	Samu Suguturaga
PR	17	Joeli Veitayaki Jr.
PR	18	Asaeli Sorovaki
LK	19	Kelepi Naimasi
FL	20	Mesulame Kunavula
SH	21	Alifereti Mocelutu
FH	22	Isaia Nataba
FB	23	Kitione Ratu
Coach:
(Fiji) Senirusi Seruvakula

Team details

Notes:

- In this uncapped match, World Rugby trialed the new 6-point try, 2-point penalty law, while a penalty try is an automatic 8 points.

21 May 2016
15:30 UYT (UTC-03)

Uruguay	22–44	Fiji Warriors
Try: Campomar (2) 10' c, 72' c Nieto 39' m Con: Vilaseca (2/3) 11', 73'	Report (In Spanish)	Try: Naimasi 3' c Vularika 8' m Hickes 25' c Penalty try 40'; Voka 43' m Reece 78' c Con: Vularika (3/5) 4', 26', 79'

Estadio Charrúa, Montevideo
Referee: Joaquín Montes (Uruguay)

Team details

FB	15	Rodrigo Silva
RW	14	Federico Favaro
OC	13	Joaquín Prada
IC	12	Andrés Vilaseca
LW	11	Nicolás Freitas
FH	10	Manuel Blengio
SH	9	Guillermo Lijtenstein
N8	8	Alejandro Nieto
OF	7	Gonzalo Campomar
BF	6	Juan Manuel Gaminara (c)
RL	5	Diego Ayala
LL	4	Franco Lamanna
TP	3	Diego Arbelo
HK	2	Carlos Arboleya
LP	1	Mateo Sanguinetti
Replacements:
HK	16	Germán Kessler
PR	17	Facundo Gattas
PR	18	Juan Echeverría
LK	19	Ignacio Dotti
FL	20	Diego Magno
FL	21	Matías Beer
CE	22	Facundo Klappenbach
WG	23	Santiago Martinez
Coach:
(Uruguay) Esteban Meneses

FB	15	Kitione Ratu
RW	14	Lepani Raiyala
OC	13	Aporosa Duwai
IC	12	Frederick Hickes
LW	11	Nacani Wakaya
FH	10	Seru Vularika
SH	9	Henry Seniloli
N8	8	Eremasi Radrodo (c)
OF	7	Mosese Voka
BF	6	Kelepi Naimasi
RL	5	Mataiasi Ucutabua
LL	4	Joseva Levula
TP	3	Mesake Doge
HK	2	Jale Sessen
LP	1	Joeli Veitayaki Jr.
Replacements:
HK	16	Samu Suguturaga
PR	17	Osea Naganilau
PR	18	Asaeli Sorovaki
LK	19	Vasikali Mudu
FL	20	Johnny Dyer
SH	21	Nemani Raiwalui
FH	22	Meli Nakarawa
FB	23	Cyril Reece
Coach:
(Fiji) Senirusi Seruvakula

Team details

29 May 2016
15:00 BST (UTC+01)

England	27–13	Wales
Try: Burrell 19' m Watson 32' m Youngs 43' m Clifford 46' c Yarde 60' m Con: Ford (1/5) 47'	Report	Try: Evans 5' c Con: Biggar (1/1) 6'; Pen: Biggar (2/2) 13', 27'

Twickenham Stadium, London
Attendance: 81,128
Referee: Marius Mitrea (Italy)

Team details

FB	15	Mike Brown
RW	14	Anthony Watson
OC	13	Jonathan Joseph	(substituted off) 65'
IC	12	Luther Burrell
LW	11	Marland Yarde
FH	10	George Ford	(substituted off) 75'
SH	9	Ben Youngs	(substituted off) 55'
N8	8	Jack Clifford (rugby)
OF	7	James Haskell	(substituted off) 62'
BF	6	Teimana Harrison
RL	5	Courtney Lawes	(substituted off) 62'
LL	4	Joe Launchbury
TP	3	Dan Cole	(substituted off) 68'
HK	2	Dylan Hartley (c)	(substituted off) 76'
LP	1	Matt Mullan	(substituted off) 65'
Replacements:
HK	16	Tommy Taylor	(substituted in) 76'
PR	17	Ellis Genge	(substituted in) 65'
PR	18	Paul Hill	(substituted in) 68'
LK	19	Dave Attwood	(substituted in) 62'
FL	20	Matt Kvesic	(substituted in) 62'
SH	21	Danny Care	(substituted in) 55'
FH	22	Ollie Devoto	(substituted in) 75'
CE	23	Elliot Daly	(substituted in) 65'
Coach:
(Australia) Eddie Jones

FB	15	Liam Williams
RW	14	George North
OC	13	Scott Williams	(substituted off) 55'
IC	12	Jamie Roberts
LW	11	Hallam Amos
FH	10	Dan Biggar	(substituted off) 55'
SH	9	Rhys Webb	(substituted off) 65'
N8	8	Taulupe Faletau
OF	7	Dan Lydiate (c)	(substituted off) 23'
BF	6	Ross Moriarty
RL	5	Alun Wyn Jones	(substituted off) 57'
LL	4	Jake Ball
TP	3	Samson Lee	(substituted off) 62'
HK	2	Scott Baldwin	(substituted off) 55'
LP	1	Rob Evans	(substituted off) 55'
Replacements:
HK	16	Kristian Dacey	(substituted in) 55'
PR	17	Gethin Jenkins	(substituted in) 55'
PR	18	Rhodri Jones	(substituted in) 62'
FL	19	Josh Turnbull	(substituted in) 57'
FL	20	James King	(substituted in) 23'
SH	21	Lloyd Williams	(substituted in) 65'
FH	22	Rhys Priestland	(substituted in) 55'
FH	23	Gareth Anscombe	(substituted in) 55'
Coach:
(New Zealand) Warren Gatland

Man of the Match:
Joe Launchbury (England)

Touch judges:
John Lacey (Ireland)
George Clancy (Ireland)
Television match official:
Simon McDowell (Australia)

Notes:

- Ollie Devoto, Ellis Genge, Teimana Harrison and Tommy Taylor (all England) made their international debuts.

10 June 2016
19:10 SAST (UTC+02)

South Africa A	24–32	England A
Try: Brummer 49' c Van Zyl 63' c Notshe 70' c Con: Brummer (3/3) 47', 63', 71'; Pen: April (1/1) 9'	Report	Try: Hepburn 15' c Rokoduguni 29' c Robson 32' m Devoto 77' c Con: Cipriani (3/4) 17', 30', 78'; Pen: Cipriani (2/2) 24', 54'

Free State Stadium, Bloemfontein
Attendance: 10,265
Referee: Rasta Rasivhenge (South Africa)

Team details

FB	15	Leolin Zas
RW	14	Travis Ismaiel
OC	13	Francois Venter
IC	12	Howard Mnisi	(substituted off) 71'
LW	11	Courtnall Skosan
FH	10	Garth April	(substituted off) 47'
SH	9	Nic Groom	(substituted off) 62'
N8	8	Nizaam Carr	(substituted off) 62'
OF	7	Oupa Mohojé (c)
BF	6	Sikhumbuzo Notshe
RL	5	Stephan Lewies	(substituted off) 47'
LL	4	JD Schickerling
TP	3	Vincent Koch	(substituted off) 47'	(substituted in) 60'	(substituted off) 64'
HK	2	Scarra Ntubeni	(substituted off) 47'
LP	1	Thomas du Toit	(substituted off) 47'
Replacements:
HK	16	Malcolm Marx	(substituted in) 47'
PR	17	Lizo Gqoboka	(substituted in) 47'
PR	18	Coenie Oosthuizen	(substituted in) 47'	(substituted off) 60'	(substituted in) 64'
LK	19	RG Snyman	(substituted in) 47'
FL	20	Jean-Luc du Preez	(substituted in) 62'
SH	21	Piet van Zyl	(substituted in) 62'
FH	22	Francois Brummer	(substituted in) 47'
CE	23	Lukhanyo Am	(substituted in) 71'
Coach:
(South Africa) Johan Ackermann

FB	15	Mike Haley
RW	14	Semesa Rokoduguni	(substituted off) 51'
OC	13	Nick Tompkins
IC	12	Ollie Devoto
LW	11	Alex Lewington	(substituted off) 71'
FH	10	Danny Cipriani
SH	9	Dan Robson	(substituted off) 34'
N8	8	Sam Jones	(substituted off) 60'
OF	7	Matt Kvesic
BF	6	Don Armand
RL	5	Charlie Ewels
LL	4	Dave Attwood (c)	(substituted off) 67'
TP	3	Kieran Brookes	(substituted off) 51'
HK	2	Tommy Taylor	(substituted off) 56'
LP	1	Alec Hepburn	(substituted off) 51'
Replacements:
HK	16	George McGuigan	(substituted in) 56'
PR	17	Ross Harrison	(substituted in) 51'
PR	18	Jake Cooper-Woolley	(substituted in) 51'
LK	19	Mitch Lees	(substituted in) 67'
FL	20	Dave Ewers	(substituted in) 60'
SH	21	Micky Young	(substituted in) 34'
CE	22	Sam James	(substituted in) 71'
WG	23	Christian Wade	(substituted in) 51'
Coach:
(England) Ali Hepher

Man of the Match:
Danny Cipriani (England Saxons)

Touch judges:
Lourens van der Merwe (South Africa)
Jaco Kotze (South Africa)
Television match official:
Marius Jonker (South Africa)

11 June 2016
15:00 (UTC+13)

Samoa	19–19	Georgia
Try: Lemi 44' c Con: Fa'apale (1/1) 44'; Pen: Fa'apale (4/4) 32', 40', 41', 54'	Report	Try: Tkhilaishvili 50' c Con: Kvirikashvili (1/1) 51'; Pen: Kvirikashvili (4/6) 3', 8', 37', 62'

Apia Park, Apia
Attendance: 5,500
Referee: Ben O'Keeffe (New Zealand)

Team details

FB	15	Albert Nikoro
RW	14	Fa'atoina Autagavaia	(substituted off) 73'
OC	13	Rey Lee-Lo
IC	12	Faialaga Afamasaga
LW	11	David Lemi (c)
FH	10	Patrick Fa'apale	(substituted off) 75'
SH	9	Dwayne Polataivao	(substituted off) 77'
N8	8	Jeff Lepa
OF	7	TJ Ioane	(substituted off) 66'
BF	6	Alafoti Fa'osiliva
RL	5	Filo Paulo	(substituted off) 71'
LL	4	Fa'atiga Lemalu
TP	3	James Johnston	59' to 70'
HK	2	Motu Matu'u	(substituted off) 57'
LP	1	Sam Aiono	(substituted off) 73'
Replacements:
HK	16	Seilala Lam	(substituted in) 57'
PR	17	Nu'uuli Lene	(substituted in) 73'
PR	18	Jake Grey	(substituted in) 59'	(substituted off) 70'
LK	19	Talaga Alofipo	(substituted in) 71'
FL	20	Oneone Fa'afou	(substituted in) 66'
WG	21	Danny Tusitala	(substituted in) 77'
FB	22	D'Angelo Leuila	(substituted in) 75'
WG	23	Malu Falaniko	(substituted in) 73'
Coach:
(Samoa) Alama Ieremia

FB	15	Merab Kvirikashvili	(substituted off) 72'
RW	14	Giorgi Pruidze	(substituted off) 72'
OC	13	Davit Kacharava
IC	12	Merab Sharikadze
LW	11	Alexander Todua
FH	10	Lasha Khmaladze
SH	9	Giorgi Begadze	(substituted off) 59'
N8	8	Lasha Lomidze
OF	7	Giorgi Tkhilaishvili
BF	6	Shalva Sutiashvili (c)	(substituted off) 71'
RL	5	Giorgi Nemsadze
LL	4	Giorgi Chkhaidze	(substituted off) 71'
TP	3	Irakli Mirtskhulava	(substituted off) 51'
HK	2	Jaba Bregvadze	(substituted off) 51'
LP	1	Kakha Asieshvili	(substituted off) 51'
Replacements:
HK	16	Shalva Mamukashvili	(substituted in) 51'
PR	17	Zurab Zhvania	(substituted in) 51'
PR	18	Anton Peikrishvili	(substituted in) 51'
LK	19	Nodar Tcheishvili	(substituted in) 71'
FL	20	Saba Shubitidze	(substituted in) 71'
SH	21	Vazha Khutsishvili	(substituted in) 59'
FH	22	Lasha Malaghuradze	(substituted in) 72'
CE	23	Tamaz Mchedlidze	(substituted in) 72'
Coach:
(New Zealand) Milton Haig

Touch judges:
Andrew Lees (Australia)
James Leckie (Australia)

Notes:

- This was the first time that Samoa has hosted Georgia in a home test match.
- Talaga Alofipo, Malu Falaniko, Seilala Lam, Nu'uuli Lene, Jeff Lepa, D'Angelo Leuila, Albert Nikoro, Dwayne Polataivao and Danny Tusitala (all Samoa) made their international debuts.

11 June 2016
19:35 NZST (UTC+12)

New Zealand	39–21	Wales
Try: J. Savea 15' m Naholo (2) 18' c, 62' c Read 68' c Harris 80' c Con: Cruden (4/5) 19', 63', 69', 80'; Pen: Cruden (2/4) 5', 48'	Report	Try: Faletau 9' m Webb 31' c Con: Biggar (1/2) 32'; Pen: Biggar (3/4) 21', 26', 53'

Eden Park, Auckland
Attendance: 46,270
Referee: Wayne Barnes (England)

Team details

FB	15	Ben Smith
RW	14	Waisake Naholo
OC	13	Malakai Fekitoa	(substituted off) 75'
IC	12	Ryan Crotty
LW	11	Julian Savea	(substituted off) 43'
FH	10	Aaron Cruden
SH	9	Aaron Smith	(substituted off) 69'
N8	8	Kieran Read (c)
OF	7	Sam Cane	(substituted off) 60'
BF	6	Jerome Kaino
RL	5	Brodie Retallick
LL	4	Luke Romano	(substituted off) 53'
TP	3	Owen Franks	(substituted off) 46'
HK	2	Dane Coles	(substituted off) 72'
LP	1	Joe Moody	(substituted off) 48'
Replacements:
HK	16	Nathan Harris	(substituted in) 72'
PR	17	Wyatt Crockett	(substituted in) 48'
PR	18	Charlie Faumuina	(substituted in) 46'
LK	19	Patrick Tuipulotu	(substituted in) 53'
FL	20	Ardie Savea	(substituted in) 60'
SH	21	TJ Perenara	(substituted in) 69'
FH	22	Beauden Barrett	(substituted in) 43'
CE	23	Seta Tamanivalu	(substituted in) 75'
Coach:
(New Zealand) Steve Hansen

FB	15	Liam Williams	(substituted off) 65'
RW	14	George North	(substituted off) 78'
OC	13	Jonathan Davies
IC	12	Jamie Roberts	(substituted off) 65'
LW	11	Hallam Amos
FH	10	Dan Biggar
SH	9	Rhys Webb	(substituted off) 72'
N8	8	Taulupe Faletau
OF	7	Sam Warburton (c)	(substituted off) 72'
BF	6	Ross Moriarty
RL	5	Alun Wyn Jones	(substituted off) 45'	(substituted in) 51'
LL	4	Bradley Davies			(substituted off) 72'
TP	3	Samson Lee	(substituted off) 72'
HK	2	Ken Owens	(substituted off) 65'
LP	1	Gethin Jenkins	(substituted off) 65'
Replacements:
HK	16	Scott Baldwin	(substituted in) 65'
PR	17	Rob Evans	(substituted in) 65'
PR	18	Tomas Francis	(substituted in) 72'
LK	19	Jake Ball	(substituted in) 45'	(substituted off) 51'	(substituted in) 72'
FL	20	Ellis Jenkins	(substituted in) 72'
SH	21	Gareth Davies	(substituted in) 72'
FH	22	Gareth Anscombe	(substituted in) 65'
CE	23	Scott Williams	(substituted in) 65'
Coach:
(New Zealand) Warren Gatland

Man of the Match:
Ben Smith (New Zealand)

Touch judges:
Jaco Peyper (South Africa)
Will Houston (Australia)
Television match official:
George Ayoub (Australia)

Notes:

- Alun Wyn Jones became the fifth Welsh player to earn his 100th cap.
- Ardie Savea and Seta Tamanivalu (both New Zealand) and Ellis Jenkins (Wales) made their international debuts.
- There was no replacement issued for George North when he was taken off injured at the end of the game, Wales played with 14 players.

11 June 2016
20:00 AEST (UTC+10)

Australia	28–39	England
Try: Hooper (2) 8' m, 58' m Folau 15' m Kuridrani 70' c Con: Foley (1/4) 71'; Pen: Foley (2/2) 36', 77'	Report	Try: Joseph 31' c Yarde 45' c Nowell 79' c Con: Farrell (3/3) 32', 47', 80'; Pen: Farrell (6/7) 20', 27', 30', 40', 56', 66'

Lang Park, Brisbane
Attendance: 48,735
Referee: Romain Poite (France)

Team details

FB	15	Israel Folau
RW	14	Dane Haylett-Petty
OC	13	Tevita Kuridrani
IC	12	Samu Kerevi
LW	11	Rob Horne		(substituted off) 28'
FH	10	Bernard Foley
SH	9	Nick Phipps		(substituted off) 77'
N8	8	David Pocock
OF	7	Michael Hooper			(substituted off) 69'
BF	6	Scott Fardy		(substituted off) 67'	(substituted in) 69'
RL	5	Rob Simmons		(substituted off) 24'
LL	4	Rory Arnold		(substituted off) 47'
TP	3	Greg Holmes		(substituted off) 56'
HK	2	Stephen Moore (c)		(substituted off) 56'
LP	1	Scott Sio	(yellow card) 53' to 63'	(substituted off) 65'
Replacements:
PR	16	Tatafu Polota-Nau		(substituted in) 56'
PR	17	James Slipper		(substituted in) 65'
HK	18	Sekope Kepu		(substituted in) 56'
LK	19	James Horwill		(substituted in) 24'
LK	20	Dean Mumm		(substituted in) 47'
FL	21	Sean McMahon		(substituted in) 67'
SH	22	Nick Frisby		(substituted in) 77'
FH	23	Christian Lealiifano		(substituted in) 28'
Coach:
(Australia) Michael Cheika

FB	15	Mike Brown
RW	14	Anthony Watson	(substituted off) 69'
OC	13	Jonathan Joseph
IC	12	Luther Burrell	(substituted off) 28'
LW	11	Marland Yarde
FH	10	Owen Farrell
SH	9	Ben Youngs	(substituted off) 69'
N8	8	Billy Vunipola	(substituted off) 71'
OF	7	James Haskell
BF	6	Chris Robshaw
RL	5	George Kruis	(substituted off) 59'
LL	4	Maro Itoje
TP	3	Dan Cole	(substituted off) 65'
HK	2	Dylan Hartley (c)	(substituted off) 71'
LP	1	Mako Vunipola	(substituted off) 65'
Replacements:
HK	16	Luke Cowan-Dickie	(substituted in) 71'
PR	17	Matt Mullan	(substituted in) 65'
PR	18	Paul Hill	(substituted in) 65'
LK	19	Joe Launchbury	(substituted in) 71'
LK	20	Courtney Lawes	(substituted in) 59'
SH	21	Danny Care	(substituted in) 69'
FH	22	George Ford	(substituted in) 28'
WG	23	Jack Nowell	(substituted in) 69'
Coach:
(Australia) Eddie Jones

Man of the Match:
James Haskell (England)

Touch judges:
Craig Joubert (South Africa)
Glen Jackson (New Zealand)
Television match official:
Ben Skeen (New Zealand)

Notes:

- Rory Arnold, Nick Frisby, Samu Kerevi and Dane Haylett-Petty (all Australia) made their international debuts.
- Mike Brown (England) earned his 50th test cap.
- England win back-to-back tests in Australia for the first time since 2003, while winning in Brisbane for the first time ever.
- The 39 points scored by England, are the most points scored by England against Australia.

11 June 2016
17:00 SAST (UTC+02)

South Africa	20–26	Ireland
Try: Mvovo 31' c Du Toit 68' c Con: Jantjies (2/2) 31', 68'; Pen: Lambie (1/2) 15'; Jantjies (1/1) 25'	Report	Try: Payne 10' c Murray 42' c Con: Jackson (2/2) 11', 42'; Pen: Jackson (3/4) 18', 67', 76'; Drop: Jackson (1/2) 36'

Newlands Stadium, Cape Town
Attendance: 42,620
Referee: Mathieu Raynal (France)

Team details

FB	15	Willie le Roux
RW	14	JP Pietersen
OC	13	Lionel Mapoe		(substituted off) 68'
IC	12	Damian de Allende
LW	11	Lwazi Mvovo
FH	10	Pat Lambie		(substituted off) 22'
SH	9	Faf de Klerk		(substituted off) 68'
N8	8	Duane Vermeulen
OF	7	Siya Kolisi
BF	6	Francois Louw		(substituted off) 55'
RL	5	Lood de Jager	(yellow card) 10' to 20'	(substituted off) 55'
LL	4	Eben Etzebeth
TP	3	Frans Malherbe		(substituted off) 76'
HK	2	Adriaan Strauss (c)
LP	1	Tendai Mtawarira		(substituted off) 58'
Replacements:
PR	16	Bongi Mbonambi
PR	17	Trevor Nyakane		(substituted in) 58'
HK	18	Julian Redelinghuys		(substituted in) 76'
LK	19	Pieter-Steph du Toit		(substituted in) 55'
N8	20	Warren Whiteley		(substituted in) 55'
SH	21	Rudy Paige		(substituted in) 68'
FH	22	Elton Jantjies		(substituted in) 22'
CE	23	Jesse Kriel		(substituted in) 68'
Coach:
(South Africa) Allister Coetzee

FB	15	Jared Payne
RW	14	Andrew Trimble
OC	13	Robbie Henshaw	(yellow card) 31' to 41'
IC	12	Luke Marshall
LW	11	Keith Earls		(substituted off) 76'
FH	10	Paddy Jackson
SH	9	Conor Murray
N8	8	Jamie Heaslip
OF	7	Jordi Murphy		(substituted off) 73'
BF	6	CJ Stander	(red card) 22'
RL	5	Devin Toner
LL	4	Iain Henderson		(substituted off) 68'
TP	3	Mike Ross		(substituted off) 58'
HK	2	Rory Best (c)		(substituted off) 68'
LP	1	Jack McGrath
Replacements:
HK	16	Sean Cronin		(substituted in) 68'
PR	17	Finlay Bealham
PR	18	Tadhg Furlong		(substituted in) 58'
LK	19	Ultan Dillane		(substituted in) 68'
FL	20	Rhys Ruddock		(substituted in) 73'
SH	21	Kieran Marmion
FH	22	Ian Madigan
WG	23	Craig Gilroy		(substituted in) 76'
Coach:
(New Zealand) Joe Schmidt

Man of the Match:
Devin Toner (Ireland)

Touch judges:
Angus Gardner (Australia)
Matthew Carley (England)
Television match official:
Jim Yuille (Scotland)

Notes:

- Faf de Klerk (South Africa) made his international debut.
- This was Ireland's first ever victory over South Africa in South Africa.

11 June 2016
15:45 ART (UTC-03)

Argentina	30–24	Italy
Try: Montero 25' m Moroni 60' c Con: Sánchez (1/2) 61'; Pen: Sánchez (6/7) 9', 20', 31', 36', 58', 65'	Report	Try: Sarto 34' c Favaro 68' m Con: Canna (1/1) 35'; Pen: Canna (4/5) 15', 28', 39', 42'

Estadio Brigadier General Estanislao López, Santa Fe
Attendance: 30,000
Referee: Stuart Berry (South Africa)

Team details

FB	15	Joaquín Tuculet
RW	14	Santiago Cordero		(substituted off) 73'
OC	13	Matías Moroni
IC	12	Juan Martín Hernández		(substituted off) 59'
LW	11	Manuel Montero
FH	10	Nicolás Sánchez
SH	9	Martín Landajo		(substituted off) 59'
N8	8	Facundo Isa
OF	7	Tomás Lezana		(substituted off) 65'
BF	6	Pablo Matera
RL	5	Matías Alemanno		(substituted off) 58'
LL	4	Guido Petti	(yellow card) 28' to 38'
TP	3	Nahuel Tetaz Chaparro
HK	2	Agustín Creevy (c)		(substituted off) 65'
LP	1	Santiago García Botta
Replacements:
HK	16	Julián Montoya		(substituted in) 65'
PR	17	Felipe Arregui
PR	18	Enrique Pieretto
FL	19	Javier Ortega Desio		(substituted in) 58'
FL	20	Juan Manuel Leguizamón		(substituted in) 65'
SH	21	Tomás Cubelli		(substituted in) 59'
CE	22	Jerónimo de la Fuente		(substituted in) 59'
FB	23	Ramiro Moyano		(substituted in) 73'
Coach:
(Argentina) Daniel Hourcade

FB	15	Luke McLean
RW	14	Leonardo Sarto
OC	13	Michele Campagnaro
IC	12	Tommaso Boni
LW	11	David Odiete	(substituted off) 62'
FH	10	Carlo Canna	(substituted off) 69'
SH	9	Edoardo Gori (c)
N8	8	Dries van Schalkwyk
OF	7	Simone Favaro
BF	6	Braam Steyn	(substituted off) 9'
RL	5	Marco Fuser
LL	4	Quintin Geldenhuys	(substituted off) 51'
TP	3	Lorenzo Cittadini	(substituted off) 55'
HK	2	Ornel Gega	(substituted off) 62'
LP	1	Andrea Lovotti	(substituted off) 57'
Replacements:
HK	16	Oliviero Fabiani	(substituted in) 62'
PR	17	Sami Panico	(substituted in) 57'
PR	18	Pietro Ceccarelli	(substituted in) 55'
LK	19	Valerio Bernabò	(substituted in) 51'
FL	20	Robert Barbieri	(substituted in) 9'
SH	21	Guglielmo Palazzani
FH	22	Tommaso Allan	(substituted in) 69'
WG	23	Giovanbattista Venditti	(substituted in) 62'
Coach:
(Ireland) Conor O'Shea

Touch judges:
Luke Pearce (England)
Joaquín Montes (Uruguay)
Television match official:
Johan Greeff (South Africa)

Notes:

- Tommaso Boni and Sami Panico (both Italy) made their international debuts.

11 June 2016
15:00 PDT (UTC-07)

Canada	22–26	Japan
Try: Paris 6' m Barkwill 20' c Cudmore 45' m Carpenter 79' m Con: McRorie (1/4) 21'	Report	Try: Kizu 33' c Matsushima 69' c Con: Tamura (2/2) 35', 70'; Pen: Tamura (4/4) 10', 40', 51', 75'

BC Place, Vancouver
Attendance: 10,250
Referee: Federico Anselmi (Argentina)

Team details

FB	15	Matt Evans
RW	14	Dan Moor
OC	13	Brock Staller
IC	12	Nick Blevins
LW	11	Taylor Paris		(substituted off) 72'
FH	10	Pat Parfrey		(substituted off) 60'
SH	9	Gordon McRorie
N8	8	Aaron Carpenter	(yellow card) 51' to 61'
OF	7	Lucas Rumball		(substituted off) 54'
BF	6	Kyle Baillie		(substituted off) 66'
RL	5	Evan Olmstead
LL	4	Jamie Cudmore (c)		(substituted off) 60'
TP	3	Jake Ilnicki		(substituted off) 72'
HK	2	Ray Barkwill		(substituted off) 67'
LP	1	Djustice Sears-Duru
Replacements:
HK	16	Eric Howard		(substituted in) 67'
PR	17	Tom Dolezel		(substituted in) 72'
PR	18	Matt Tierney
LK	19	Paul Ciulini		(substituted in) 60'
FL	20	Matt Heaton		(substituted in) 54'
FL	21	Alistair Clark		(substituted in) 66'
SH	22	Jamie Mackenzie		(substituted in) 60'
CE	23	Mozac Samson		(substituted in) 72'
Coach:
(New Zealand) Mark Anscombe

FB	15	Kotaro Matsushima
RW	14	Mifiposeti Paea
OC	13	Tim Bennetts		(substituted off) 70'
IC	12	Harumichi Tatekawa (c)
LW	11	Yasutaka Sasakura		(substituted off) 76'
FH	10	Yu Tamura
SH	9	Fumiaki Tanaka		(substituted off) 40'
N8	8	Kyosuke Horie
OF	7	Taiyo Ando		(substituted off) 40'
BF	6	Yoshiya Hosoda	(red card) 54'
RL	5	Naohiro Kotaki
LL	4	Kazuhiko Usami		(substituted off) 70'
TP	3	Kensuke Hatakeyama		(substituted off) 49'
HK	2	Takeshi Kizu
LP	1	Keita Inagaki
Replacements:
HK	16	Futoshi Mori
PR	17	Masataka Mikami
PR	18	Shinnosuke Kakinaga		(substituted in) 49'
LK	19	Kotaro Yatabe		(substituted in) 70'
FL	20	Shokei Kin		(substituted in) 40'
SH	21	Kaito Shigeno		(substituted in) 40'
FH	22	Kosei Ono		(substituted in) 70'
FB	23	Rikiya Matsuda		(substituted in) 76'
Coach:
(New Zealand) Mark Hammett

Man of the Match:
Djustice Sears-Duru (Canada)

Touch judges:
Kurt Weaver (United States)
Derek Summers (United States)
Television match official:
David Smortchevsky (Canada)

Notes:

- Matt Heaton (Canada) and Yoshiya Hosoda, Rikiya Matsuda, Mifiposeti Paea, Yasutaka Sasakura and Kaito Shigeno (all Japan) made their international debuts.

14 June 2016
18:35 NZST (UTC+12)

Chiefs (New Zealand)	40–7	Wales
Try: Weber 7' c Sanders 31' c Bird 37' c Lowe 66' c Pulu 74' m McNicol 77' c Con: Donald (4/4) 7', 32', 39', 67'; Lowe (1/2) 78'	Report	Try: Dacey 55' c Con: Priestland (1/1) 56'

Waikato Stadium, Hamilton
Attendance: 17,756
Referee: Mike Fraser (New Zealand)

Team details

FB	15	(New Zealand) James Lowe
RW	14	(Niue) Toni Pulu
OC	13	(New Zealand) Anton Lienert-Brown
IC	12	(New Zealand) Andrew Horrell
LW	11	(New Zealand) Sam Vaka	(substituted off) 49'
FH	10	(New Zealand) Stephen Donald (c)	(substituted off) 68'
SH	9	(New Zealand) Brad Weber	(substituted off) 71'
N8	8	(New Zealand) Tom Sanders	(substituted off) 61'
OF	7	(New Zealand) Lachlan Boshier
BF	6	(New Zealand) Mitchell Brown
RL	5	(New Zealand) Michael Allardice	(substituted off) 26'
LL	4	(New Zealand) Dominic Bird
TP	3	(Japan) Hiroshi Yamashita	(substituted off) 49'
HK	2	(New Zealand) Rhys Marshall	(substituted off) 40'
LP	1	(New Zealand) Mitchell Graham	(substituted off) 14'
Replacements:
HK	16	(New Zealand) Hika Elliot	(substituted in) 40'
PR	17	(Tonga) Siegfried Fisiihoi	(substituted in) 14'
PR	18	(New Zealand) Atunaisa Moli	(substituted in) 49'
FL	19	(New Zealand) Taleni Seu	(substituted in) 26'
FL	20	(New Zealand) Tevita Koloamatangi	(substituted in) 61'
SH	21	(New Zealand) Kayne Hammington	(substituted in) 71'
FH	22	(New Zealand) Sam McNicol	(substituted in) 49'
WG	23	(Tonga) Latu Vaeno	(substituted in) 68'
Coach:
(New Zealand) Dave Rennie

FB	15	Matthew Morgan
RW	14	Eli Walker
OC	13	Tyler Morgan	(substituted off) 55'
IC	12	Scott Williams	(substituted off) 61'
LW	11	Tom James
FH	10	Rhys Priestland
SH	9	Gareth Davies	(substituted off) 56'
N8	8	James King
OF	7	Sam Warburton	(substituted off) 45'
BF	6	Josh Turnbull
RL	5	Luke Charteris (c)
LL	4	Jake Ball	(substituted off) 49'
TP	3	Tomas Francis	(substituted off) 56'
HK	2	Scott Baldwin	(substituted off) 49'
LP	1	Rob Evans	(substituted off) 49'
Replacements:
HK	16	Kristian Dacey	(substituted in) 49'
PR	17	Aaron Jarvis	(substituted in) 49'
PR	18	Rhodri Jones	(substituted in) 56'
LK	19	Bradley Davies	(substituted in) 49'
N8	20	Taulupe Faletau	(substituted in) 45'
SH	21	Aled Davies	(substituted in) 56'
CE	22	Jamie Roberts	(substituted in) 55'
FH	23	Rhys Patchell	(substituted in) 61'
Coach:
(New Zealand) Warren Gatland

Man of the Match:
(New Zealand) Stephen Donald (Chiefs)

Touch judges:
Nick Briant (New Zealand)
Jamie Nutbrown (New Zealand)
Television match official:
Shane McDermott (New Zealand)

Notes:

- Ellis Jenkins was named to start, but was withdrawn from the team after failing to recover from injury and was replaced with Sam Warburton.
- Bench players Gareth Anscombe and Ross Moriarty were pulled out of the team moments before kick-off due to injury and replaced with Taulupe Faletau and Jamie Roberts.

17 June 2016
19:10 SAST (UTC+02)

South Africa A	26–29	England A
Try: Du Preez 8' m Petersen (2) 39' c, 42' c Venter 45' c Con: Brummer (2/3) 40', 46'; Zas (1/1) 43'	Report	Try: Taylor (2) 35' m, 47' c Kvesic 55' c Wade 74' c Con: Cipriani (3/4) 49', 56', 75'; Pen: Cipriani (1/1) 29'

Outeniqua Park, George
Referee: Jaco van Heerden (South Africa)

Team details

FB	15	Leolin Zas	(substituted off) 76'
RW	14	Sergeal Petersen
OC	13	Francois Venter
IC	12	Lukhanyo Am
LW	11	Courtnall Skosan	(substituted off) 58'
FH	10	Francois Brummer
SH	9	Piet van Zyl	(substituted off) 63'
N8	8	Arno Botha
OF	7	Oupa Mohojé (c)	(substituted off) 35'
BF	6	Jean-Luc du Preez
RL	5	RG Snyman	(substituted off) 62'
LL	4	Jason Jenkins
TP	3	Marcel van der Merwe	(substituted off) 40'
HK	2	Malcolm Marx	(substituted off) 58'
LP	1	Thomas du Toit	(substituted off) 40'
Replacements:
HK	16	Edgar Marutlulle	(substituted in) 58'
PR	17	Coenie Oosthuizen	(substituted in) 40'
PR	18	Lizo Gqoboka	(substituted in) 40'
LK	19	JD Schickerling	(substituted in) 62'
FL	20	Nizaam Carr	(substituted in) 35'
SH	21	Ntando Kebe	(substituted in) 63'
CE	22	Howard Mnisi	(substituted in) 76'
WG	23	Travis Ismaiel	(substituted in) 58'
Coach:
(South Africa) Johan Ackermann

FB	15	Mike Haley	(substituted off) 3'
RW	14	Semesa Rokoduguni	(substituted off) 63'
OC	13	Nick Tompkins
IC	12	Ollie Devoto
LW	11	Christian Wade
FH	10	Danny Cipriani
SH	9	Dan Robson	(substituted off) 67'
N8	8	Don Armand	(substituted off) 69'
OF	7	Matt Kvesic
BF	6	Dave Ewers
RL	5	Charlie Ewels	(substituted off) 53'
LL	4	Dave Attwood (c)
TP	3	Kieran Brookes	(substituted off) 57'
HK	2	Tommy Taylor	(substituted off) 67'
LP	1	Alec Hepburn
Replacements:
HK	16	George McGuigan	(substituted in) 67'
PR	17	Ross Harrison
PR	18	Jake Cooper-Woolley	(substituted in) 57'
LK	19	Mitch Lees	(substituted in) 53'
FL	20	Sam Jones	(substituted in) 69'
SH	21	Micky Young	(substituted in) 67'
CE	22	Sam Hill	(substituted in) 63'
CE	23	Sam James	(substituted in) 3'
Coach:
(England) Ali Hepher

Touch judges:
Quinton Immelman (South Africa)
Egon Seconds (South Africa)
Television match official:
Shaun Veldsman (South Africa)

17 June 2016
17:00 BRT (UTC-03)

Brazil	17–18	Kenya
Try: Arruda 2' m Pen: Cecarelli (4/5) 10', 16', 40', 74'	Report (In Portuguese)	Try: Ambunya 16' c Muniafu 58' m Con: Mukidza (1/2) 17'; Pen: Mukidza (2/3) 28', 77'

Zerão, Macapá
Referee: Alejandro Longres (Uruguay)

Team details

FB	15	Daniel Sancery
RW	14	Robert Tenório	(substituted off) 40'
OC	13	Felipe Sancery
IC	12	Laurent Bourda-Couhet
LW	11	Guilherme Coghetto	(substituted off) 55'
FH	10	Leonardo Cecarelli
SH	9	Johannes Beukes	(substituted off) 69'
N8	8	Nick Smith
OF	7	João Luiz da Ros (c)	(substituted off) 55'
BF	6	André Arruda
RL	5	Luiz Gustavo Viera
LL	4	Cleber Dias
TP	3	Caíque Silva	(substituted off) 60'
HK	2	Wilton Rebolo
LP	1	Lucas Abud
Replacements:
HK	16	Luan Almeida
PR	17	Jonatas Paulo	(substituted in) 60'
PR	18	Alexandre Figuero
FL	19	Matheus Wolf
FL	20	Mark Jackson	(substituted in) 55'
CE	21	Matheus Cruz	(substituted in) 69'
WG	22	Luan Soares	(substituted in) 55'
CE	23	Matheus Estrela	(substituted in) 40'
Coach:
(Argentina) Rodolfo Ambrosio

FB	15	Vincent Mose
RW	14	Darwin Mukidza
OC	13	David Ambunya
IC	12	Nick Barasa
LW	11	Dennis Muhanji		(substituted off) 72'
FH	10	Isaac Adimo		(substituted off) 55'
SH	9	Edwin Achayo
N8	8	Brian Nyikuli (c)
OF	7	Tony Owuor
BF	6	Mike Okombe		(substituted off) 50'
RL	5	Oliver Mang'eni
LL	4	Simeon Muniafu		(substituted off) 73'
TP	3	Curtis Lilako		(substituted off) 60'
HK	2	Sammy Warui		(substituted off) 50'
LP	1	Moses Amusala	(yellow card) 47' to 57'	(substituted off) 59'
Replacements:
HK	16	Peter Karia		(substituted in) 50'
PR	17	Joseph Kang'ethe		(substituted in) 50'
PR	18	James Kang'ethe		(substituted in) 60'
LK	19	Eric Kerre		(substituted in) 73'
FL	20	Dan Sikuta		(substituted in) 59'
SH	21	Samson Onsomu
CE	22	Nato Simiyu		(substituted in) 55'
FB	23	Tony Onyango		(substituted in) 72'
Coach:
(South Africa) Jerome Paarwater

Touch judges:
Murilo Bragotto (Brazil)
Régis Dantas (Brazil)

18 June 2016
12:45 FJT (UTC+12)

Tonga	20–23	Georgia
Try: Iongi 6' c Fonua 69' c Con: Takulua (1/1) 7'; Fosita (1/1) 70'; Pen: Takulua (1/2) 34'; Halaifonua (1/1) 43'	Report	Try: Kacharava (2) 19' c, 80+4' c Con: Kvirikashvili (1/1) 21'; Malaghuradze (1/1) 80+5'; Pen: Kvirikashvili (3/5) 2', 32', 41'

ANZ National Stadium, Suva, Fiji
Attendance: 300
Referee: Nick Briant (New Zealand)

Team details

FB	15	David Halaifonua
RW	14	Otulea Katoa
OC	13	Apakuki Ma'afu
IC	12	Latiume Fosita
LW	11	Viliame Iongi		(substituted off) 77'
FH	10	Kali Hala		(substituted off) 36'
SH	9	Sonatane Takulua		(substituted off) 64'
N8	8	Sione Tau	(yellow card) 80+3' to 80+5'
OF	7	Jack Ram
BF	6	Nili Latu (c)
RL	5	Daniel Faleafa
LL	4	Uili Koloʻofai		(substituted off) 55'
TP	3	Sione Faletau		(substituted off) 40'
HK	2	Elvis Taione		(substituted off) 55'
LP	1	Eddie Aholelei		(substituted off) 40'
Replacements:
PR	16	Kama Sakalia		(substituted in) 40'
HK	17	Sione Anga’aelangi		(substituted in) 55'
PR	18	Sila Puafisi		(substituted in) 40'
FL	19	Opeti Fonua		(substituted in) 55'
N8	20	Mikaele Mafi
SH	21	Wayne Ngaluafe		(substituted in) 64'
FB	22	Viliami Hakalo		(substituted in) 36'
WG	23	Daniel Kilioni		(substituted in) 77'
Coach:
(Australia) Toutai Kefu

FB	15	Merab Kvirikashvili		(substituted off) 72'
RW	14	Tamaz Mchedlidze	(yellow card) 58' to 68'	(substituted off) 69'
OC	13	Davit Kacharava
IC	12	Merab Sharikadze
LW	11	Alexander Todua
FH	10	Lasha Khmaladze
SH	9	Giorgi Begadze		(substituted off) 73'
N8	8	Beka Bitsadze
OF	7	Giorgi Tkhilaishvili		(substituted off) 58'
BF	6	Shalva Sutiashvili (c)
RL	5	Giorgi Nemsadze
LL	4	Giorgi Chkhaidze		(substituted off) 69'
TP	3	Anton Peikrishvili		(substituted off) 45'
HK	2	Jaba Bregvadze		(substituted off) 60'
LP	1	Zurab Zhvania		(substituted off) 45'
Replacements:
HK	16	Shalva Mamukashvili		(substituted in) 60'
PR	17	Kakha Asieshvili		(substituted in) 45'
PR	18	Irakli Mirtskhulava		(substituted in) 45'
LK	19	Nodar Tcheishvili		(substituted in) 69'
N8	20	Lasha Lomidze		(substituted in) 58'
SH	21	Vazha Khutsishvili		(substituted in) 73'
FH	22	Lasha Malaghuradze		(substituted in) 72'
WG	23	Giorgi Pruidze		(substituted in) 69'
Coach:
(New Zealand) Milton Haig

Touch judges:
Pascal Gaüzère (France)
Faa'vae Neru (Samoa)

Notes:

- Wayne Ngaluafe (Tonga) made his international debut.

18 June 2016
19:35 NZST (UTC+12)

New Zealand	36–22	Wales
Try: Dagg 20' c B. Smith 51' c Barrett 55' c Naholo 60' m Savea 65' c Con: Cruden (1/1) 22'; Barrett (3/4) 52', 55', 66'; Pen: Cruden (1/1) 30'	Report	Try: Jones 40' c L. Williams 73' c J. Davies 76' m Con: Biggar (2/2) 40', 74'; Pen: Biggar (1/1) 17'

Wellington Regional Stadium, Wellington
Attendance: 35,907
Referee: Jaco Peyper (South Africa)

Team details

FB	15	Israel Dagg
RW	14	Ben Smith
OC	13	Malakai Fekitoa	2' to 15'		(substituted off) 40'
IC	12	Ryan Crotty
LW	11	Waisake Naholo
FH	10	Aaron Cruden	(substituted off) 33'
SH	9	Aaron Smith	(substituted off) 64'
N8	8	Kieran Read (c)
OF	7	Sam Cane	(substituted off) 57'
BF	6	Jerome Kaino
RL	5	Sam Whitelock
LL	4	Brodie Retallick	(substituted off) 67'
TP	3	Owen Franks	(substituted off) 46'
HK	2	Dane Coles	(substituted off) 75'
LP	1	Joe Moody	(substituted off) 54'
Replacements:
HK	16	Nathan Harris	(substituted in) 75'
PR	17	Wyatt Crockett	(substituted in) 54'
PR	18	Charlie Faumuina	(substituted in) 46'
LK	19	Patrick Tuipulotu	(substituted in) 67'
FL	20	Ardie Savea	(substituted in) 57'
SH	21	TJ Perenara	(substituted in) 64'
FH	22	Beauden Barrett	(substituted in) 33'
CE	23	Seta Tamanivalu	(substituted in) 2'	(substituted off) 15'	(substituted in) 40'
Coach:
(New Zealand) Steve Hansen

FB	15	Rhys Patchell
RW	14	Liam Williams
OC	13	Jonathan Davies
IC	12	Jamie Roberts	(substituted off) 77'
LW	11	Hallam Amos
FH	10	Dan Biggar	(substituted off) 75'
SH	9	Rhys Webb	(substituted off) 77'
N8	8	Taulupe Faletau
OF	7	Sam Warburton (c)	(substituted off) 75'
BF	6	Ross Moriarty
RL	5	Alun Wyn Jones
LL	4	Luke Charteris	(substituted off) 61'
TP	3	Samson Lee	(substituted off) 61'
HK	2	Ken Owens	(substituted off) 61'
LP	1	Gethin Jenkins	24' to 31'		(substituted off) 59'
Replacements:
HK	16	Scott Baldwin	(substituted in) 61'
PR	17	Rob Evans	(substituted in) 24'	(substituted off) 31'	(substituted in) 59'
PR	18	Tomas Francis	(substituted in) 61'
LK	19	Bradley Davies	(substituted in) 61'
FL	20	Ellis Jenkins	(substituted in) 75'
SH	21	Gareth Davies	(substituted in) 77'
FH	22	Rhys Priestland	(substituted in) 75'
CE	23	Scott Williams	(substituted in) 77'
Coach:
(New Zealand) Warren Gatland

Man of the Match:
Israel Dagg (New Zealand)

Touch judges:
Jérôme Garcès (France)
Wayne Barnes (England)
Television match official:
George Ayoub (Australia)

Notes:

- Israel Dagg and Ben Smith (New Zealand) earned their 50th test caps.

18 June 2016
20:00 AEST (UTC+10)

Australia	7–23	England
Try: Moore 34' c Con: Foley (1/1) 35'	Report	Try: Hartley 18' c Farrell 74' c Con: Farrell (2/2) 19', 75'; Pen: Farrell (3/4) 30', 51', 79'

Melbourne Rectangular Stadium, Melbourne
Attendance: 29,871
Referee: Craig Joubert (South Africa)

Team details

FB	15	Israel Folau
RW	14	Dane Haylett-Petty	(substituted off) 69'
OC	13	Tevita Kuridrani
IC	12	Samu Kerevi	(substituted off) 60'
LW	11	Rob Horne
FH	10	Bernard Foley
SH	9	Nick Phipps	(substituted off) 69'
N8	8	Sean McMahon	(substituted off) 50'
OF	7	Michael Hooper
BF	6	Scott Fardy
RL	5	Sam Carter
LL	4	Rory Arnold	33' to 40'		(substituted off) 50'
TP	3	Sekope Kepu	(substituted off) 46'
HK	2	Stephen Moore (c)	(substituted off) 54'
LP	1	James Slipper	(substituted off) 46'
Replacements:
HK	16	Tatafu Polota-Nau	(substituted in) 54'
PR	17	Toby Smith	(substituted in) 46'
PR	18	Greg Holmes	(substituted in) 46'
LK	19	Dean Mumm	(substituted in) 33'	(substituted off) 40'	(substituted in) 50'
N8	20	Ben McCalman	(substituted in) 50'
SH	21	Nick Frisby	(substituted in) 69'
CE	22	Christian Lealiifano	(substituted in) 60'
WG	23	Luke Morahan	(substituted in) 69'
Coach:
(Australia) Michael Cheika

FB	15	Mike Brown
RW	14	Anthony Watson	(substituted off) 76'
OC	13	Jonathan Joseph
IC	12	Owen Farrell
LW	11	Jack Nowell
FH	10	George Ford
SH	9	Ben Youngs	(substituted off) 65'
N8	8	Billy Vunipola
OF	7	James Haskell	(substituted off) 71'
BF	6	Chris Robshaw	(substituted off) 71'
RL	5	George Kruis	(substituted off) 55'
LL	4	Maro Itoje
TP	3	Dan Cole	(substituted off) 65'
HK	2	Dylan Hartley (c)	(substituted off) 71'
LP	1	Mako Vunipola	(substituted off) 65'
Replacements:
HK	16	Jamie George	(substituted in) 71'
PR	17	Matt Mullan	(substituted in) 65'
PR	18	Paul Hill	(substituted in) 65'
LK	19	Joe Launchbury	(substituted in) 71'
LK	20	Courtney Lawes	(substituted in) 55'
FL	21	Jack Clifford (rugby)	(substituted in) 71'
SH	22	Danny Care	(substituted in) 65'
CE	23	Elliot Daly	(substituted in) 76'
Coach:
(Australia) Eddie Jones

Man of the Match:
Chris Robshaw (England)

Touch judges:
Nigel Owens (Wales)
Mike Fraser (New Zealand)
Television match official:
Glenn Newman (New Zealand)

Notes:

- Chris Robshaw (England) earned his 50th test cap.
- England retain the Cook Cup for the third consecutive time.
- England win their first ever test-series against Australia.
- England win their third consecutive match against Australia in Australia, the first time they have done this.

18 June 2016
19:20 JST (UTC+09)

Japan	13–26	Scotland
Try: Horie 8' c Con: Tamura (1/1) 9'; Pen: Tamura (2/3) 28', 55'	Report	Try: Penalty try 37' c Nel 41' c Con: Laidlaw (2/2) 38', 43'; Pen: Laidlaw (4/4) 4', 15', 19', 62'

Toyota Stadium, Toyota, Aichi
Attendance: 24,113
Referee: Ben O'Keeffe (New Zealand)

Team details

FB	15	Kotaro Matsushima		(substituted off) 15'
RW	14	Mifiposeti Paea
OC	13	Tim Bennetts
IC	12	Harumichi Tatekawa
LW	11	Yasutaka Sasakura
FH	10	Yu Tamura
SH	9	Kaito Shigeno		(substituted off) 48'
N8	8	Amanaki Mafi
OF	7	Shokei Kin
BF	6	Hendrik Tui	(yellow card) 34' to 44'	(substituted off) 78'
RL	5	Naohiro Kotaki
LL	4	Hitoshi Ono
TP	3	Kensuke Hatakeyama		(substituted off) 51'
HK	2	Shota Horie (c)
LP	1	Keita Inagaki
Replacements:
HK	16	Takeshi Kizu
PR	17	Masataka Mikami
PR	18	Shinnosuke Kakinaga		(substituted in) 51'
LK	19	Kotaro Yatabe
FL	20	Hiroki Yamamoto		(substituted in) 78'
SH	21	Keisuke Uchida		(substituted in) 48'
FH	22	Kosei Ono
FB	23	Rikiya Matsuda	(yellow card) 37' to 47'	(substituted in) 15'
Coach:
(New Zealand) Mark Hammett

FB	15	Stuart Hogg
RW	14	Tommy Seymour
OC	13	Duncan Taylor	(substituted off) 66'
IC	12	Matt Scott
LW	11	Damien Hoyland	(substituted off) 56'
FH	10	Ruaridh Jackson
SH	9	Greig Laidlaw (c)
N8	8	Ryan Wilson	(substituted off) 64'
OF	7	John Hardie
BF	6	John Barclay
RL	5	Jonny Gray
LL	4	Richie Gray	(substituted off) 66'
TP	3	WP Nel	(substituted off) 64'
HK	2	Stuart McInally	(substituted off) 47'
LP	1	Alasdair Dickinson	(substituted off) 3'
Replacements:
HK	16	Fraser Brown	(substituted in) 47'
PR	17	Rory Sutherland	(substituted in) 3'
PR	18	Moray Low	(substituted in) 64'
LK	19	Tim Swinson	(substituted in) 66'
N8	20	David Denton	(substituted in) 64'
SH	21	Henry Pyrgos
CE	22	Peter Horne	(substituted in) 66'
WG	23	Sean Maitland	(substituted in) 56'
Coach:
(New Zealand) Vern Cotter

Touch judges:
Marius Mitrea (Italy)
Brendan Pickerill (New Zealand)
Television match official:
Ian Smith (Australia)

18 June 2016
17:00 SAST (UTC+02)

South Africa	32–26	Ireland
Try: Combrinck 55' c Whiteley 63' m Du Toit 69' c De Allende 75' c Con: Jantjies (3/4) 57', 70', 76'; Pen: Jantjies (2/4) 3', 80'	Report	Try: Toner 33' c Heaslip 59' c Con: Jackson (2/2) 34', 60'; Pen: Jackson (4/6) 10', 14', 22', 27'

Ellis Park Stadium, Johannesburg
Attendance: 58,400
Referee: Angus Gardner (Australia)

Team details

FB	15	Willie le Roux
RW	14	JP Pietersen
OC	13	Lionel Mapoe
IC	12	Damian de Allende
LW	11	Lwazi Mvovo	(substituted off) 40'
FH	10	Elton Jantjies	(substituted off) 59'	(substituted in) 62'
SH	9	Faf de Klerk
N8	8	Duane Vermeulen	(substituted off) 40'
OF	7	Siya Kolisi	(substituted off) 67'
BF	6	Francois Louw
RL	5	Pieter-Steph du Toit
LL	4	Eben Etzebeth
TP	3	Frans Malherbe	(substituted off) 46'
HK	2	Adriaan Strauss (c)
LP	1	Tendai Mtawarira	(substituted off) 51'
Replacements:
HK	16	Bongi Mbonambi
PR	17	Trevor Nyakane	(substituted in) 51'
PR	18	Julian Redelinghuys	(substituted in) 46'
LK	19	Franco Mostert	(substituted in) 67'
N8	20	Warren Whiteley	(substituted in) 40'
SH	21	Rudy Paige
FH	22	Morné Steyn	(substituted in) 59'	(substituted off) 62'
WG	23	Ruan Combrinck	(substituted in) 40'
Coach:
(South Africa) Allister Coetzee

FB	15	Jared Payne	(substituted off) 76'
RW	14	Andrew Trimble
OC	13	Robbie Henshaw	(substituted off) 76'
IC	12	Stuart Olding
LW	11	Craig Gilroy
FH	10	Paddy Jackson
SH	9	Conor Murray	(substituted off) 77'
N8	8	Jamie Heaslip
OF	7	Rhys Ruddock	42' to 49'
BF	6	Iain Henderson			(substituted off) 70'
RL	5	Quinn Roux	(substituted off) 50'
LL	4	Devin Toner
TP	3	Tadhg Furlong	(substituted off) 59'
HK	2	Rory Best (c)	(substituted off) 65'
LP	1	Jack McGrath	(substituted off) 65'
Replacements:
HK	16	Richardt Strauss	(substituted in) 65'
PR	17	David Kilcoyne]	(substituted in) 65'
PR	18	Finlay Bealham	(substituted in) 59'
LK	19	Donnacha Ryan	(substituted in) 50'
FL	20	Sean Reidy	(substituted in) 42'	(substituted off) 49'	(substituted in) 70'
SH	21	Kieran Marmion	(substituted in) 77'
FH	22	Ian Madigan	(substituted in) 76'
FB	23	Tiernan O'Halloran	(substituted in) 76'
Coach:
(New Zealand) Joe Schmidt

Man of the Match:
Ruan Combrinck (South Africa)

Touch judges:
Glen Jackson (New Zealand)
Ben Whitehouse (Wales)
Television match official:
Jim Yuille (Scotland)

Notes:

- Ruan Combrinck and Franco Mostert (both South Africa) and Tiernan O'Halloran, Sean Reidy and Quinn Roux (all Ireland) made their international debuts.

18 June 2016
15:00 MDT (UTC-06)

Canada	46–21	Russia
Try: McRorie (2) 3' c, 45' c Paris 9' m Evans 12' c Parfrey 23' c Wilson-Ross 55' c Con: McRorie (5/6) 4', 13', 24', 46', 56'; Pen: McRorie (2/2) 43', 72'	Report	Try: Zykov 29' c Yolgin 66' c Matveev 76' c Con: Kushnarev (3/3) 31', 67', 77'

Calgary Rugby Park, Calgary
Referee: Shuhei Kubo (Japan)

Team details

FB	15	Matt Evans
RW	14	Dan Moor
OC	13	Mozac Samson
IC	12	Nick Blevins
LW	11	Taylor Paris	(substituted off) 36'
FH	10	Pat Parfrey	(substituted off) 61'
SH	9	Gordon McRorie
N8	8	Aaron Carpenter
OF	7	Lucas Rumball	(substituted off) 60'
BF	6	Kyle Baillie
RL	5	Evan Olmstead
LL	4	Jamie Cudmore (c)	(substituted off) 58'
TP	3	Jake Ilnicki	(substituted off) 65'
HK	2	Ray Barkwill	(substituted off) 56'
LP	1	Djustice Sears-Duru	(substituted off) 72'
Replacements:
HK	16	Eric Howard	(substituted in) 56'
PR	17	Tom Dolezel		(substituted in) 68'
PR	18	Matt Tierney	(substituted in) 65'
LK	19	Cameron Pierce	(substituted in) 58'	(substituted off) 68'
FL	20	Alistair Clark	(substituted in) 60'
SH	21	Jamie Mackenzie	(substituted in) 72'
FH	22	Liam Underwood	(substituted in) 61'
WG	23	Jordan Wilson-Ross	(substituted in) 36'
Coach:
(New Zealand) Mark Anscombe

FB	15	Vasily Artemyev (c)
RW	14	Konstantin Uzunov
OC	13	Dimitry Gerasimov	(substituted off) 65'
IC	12	Vladimir Rudenko
LW	11	Evgeni Kolomiytsev
FH	10	Yuri Kushnarev	(substituted off) 77'
SH	9	Alexei Shcherban	(substituted off) 69'
N8	8	Anton Rudoy
OF	7	Andrei Temnov	(substituted off) 53'
BF	6	Victor Gresev
RL	5	Denis Antonov	(substituted off) 58'
LL	4	Andrei Garbuzov
TP	3	Innokenty Zykov	(substituted off) 60'
HK	2	Nazir Gasanov	(substituted off) 56'
LP	1	Azamat Bitiev	(substituted off) 53'
Replacements:
HK	16	Evgeni Matveev	(substituted in) 56'
PR	17	Alexei Volkov	(substituted in) 53'
PR	18	Vladimir Podrezov	(substituted in) 60'
LK	19	Evgeny Yolgin	(substituted in) 58'
FL	20	Pavel Butenko	(substituted in) 53'
SH	21	Ruslan Yagudin	(substituted in) 69'
FH	22	Sergey Yanyushkin	(substituted in) 77'
FB	23	Anton Ryabov	(substituted in) 65'
Coach:
(Russia) Alexander Pervukhin

Man of the Match:
Gordon McRorie (Canada)

Touch judges:
Federico Anselmi (Argentina)
Kurt Weaver (United States)
Television match official:
Davey Ardrey (United States)

Notes:

- Matt Tierney (Canada) and Konstantin Uzunov (Russia) made their international debuts.

18 June 2016
18:00 PDT (UTC-07)

United States	20–24	Italy
Try: Penaltry try 20' c Lamborn 68' c Con: MacGinty (2/2) 21', 69'; Pen: MacGinty (2/2) 11', 50'	Report	Try: Gega (2) 29' m, 54' c Con: Canna (1/2) 55'; Pen: Canna (3/3) 15', 39', 80'; Drop: Canna (1/1) 43'

Avaya Stadium, San Jose
Referee: Marius van der Westhuizen (South Africa)

Team details

FB	15	Will Holder
RW	14	Takudzwa Ngwenya		(substituted off) 4'
OC	13	Thretton Palamo
IC	12	Shalom Suniula
LW	11	Blaine Scully
FH	10	AJ MacGinty
SH	9	Nate Augspurger
N8	8	Cam Dolan	(yellow card) 53' to 63'
OF	7	Todd Clever (c)
BF	6	Andrew Durutalo
RL	5	Greg Peterson		(substituted off) 21'
LL	4	Nate Brakeley
TP	3	Chris Baumann		(substituted off) 66'
HK	2	James Hilterbrand		(substituted off) 52'
LP	1	Titi Lamositele		(substituted off) 75'
Replacements:
HK	16	Joe Taufete'e		(substituted in) 52'
PR	17	Ben Tarr		(substituted in) 66'
PR	18	Angus MacLellan		(substituted in) 75'
LK	19	Stephen Tomasin
FL	20	Harry Higgins
FL	21	Tony Lamborn		(substituted in) 21'
CE	22	Chad London
FB	23	Mike Te'o		(substituted in) 4'
Coach:
(New Zealand) John Mitchell

FB	15	Luke McLean
RW	14	Leonardo Sarto		(substituted off) 4'
OC	13	Michele Campagnaro
IC	12	Tommaso Castello
LW	11	David Odiete
FH	10	Carlo Canna	(yellow card) 20' to 30'
SH	9	Edoardo Gori (c)		(substituted off) 64'
N8	8	Dries van Schalkwyk
OF	7	Simone Favaro
BF	6	Maxime Mbanda		(substituted off) 61'
RL	5	Marco Fuser
LL	4	Quintin Geldenhuys		(substituted off) 55'
TP	3	Lorenzo Cittadini		(substituted off) 55'
HK	2	Ornel Gega		(substituted off) 55'
LP	1	Andrea Lovotti		(substituted off) 59'
Replacements:
HK	16	Oliviero Fabiani		(substituted in) 55'
PR	17	Sami Panico		(substituted in) 59'
PR	18	Pietro Ceccarelli		(substituted in) 55'
LK	19	Valerio Bernabò		(substituted in) 55'
FL	20	Sebastian Negri		(substituted in) 61'
SH	21	Guglielmo Palazzani		(substituted in) 64'
FH	22	Tommaso Allan
WG	23	Giovanbattista Venditti		(substituted in) 4'
Coach:
(Ireland) Conor O'Shea

Touch judges:
Matthew Carley (England)
Chris Assmus (Canada)
Television match official:
Graham Hughes (England)

Notes:

- Nate Augspurger, Tony Lamborn and Angus MacLellan (all United States) and Tommaso Castello, Maxime Mbanda and Sebastian Negri (all Italy) made their international debuts.

19 June 2016
18:10 ART (UTC-03)

Argentina	30–19	France
Try: Montero 19' c Tuculet 28' c Petti 73' c Con: Sánchez (3/3) 20', 29', 74'; Pen: Sánchez (3/5) 16', 61', 65'	Report	Try: Bonfils 31' c Con: Plisson (1/1) 32'; Pen: Plisson (4/6) 10', 43', 48', 53'

Estadio Monumental José Fierro, Tucumán
Referee: John Lacey (Ireland)

Team details

FB	15	Joaquín Tuculet		(substituted off) 75'
RW	14	Santiago Cordero
OC	13	Matías Moroni
IC	12	Juan Martín Hernández		(substituted off) 21'
LW	11	Manuel Montero
FH	10	Nicolás Sánchez
SH	9	Martín Landajo		(substituted off) 61'
N8	8	Facundo Isa
OF	7	Tomás Lezana		(substituted off) 59'
BF	6	Pablo Matera
RL	5	Javier Ortega Desio	(yellow card) 48' to 58'
LL	4	Guido Petti
TP	3	Ramiro Herrera
HK	2	Agustín Creevy (c)		(substituted off) 65'
LP	1	Nahuel Tetaz Chaparro		(substituted off) 79'
Replacements:
HK	16	Julián Montoya		(substituted in) 65'
PR	17	Santiago García Botta		(substituted in) 79'
PR	18	Enrique Pieretto
LK	19	Ignacio Larrague
FL	20	Juan Manuel Leguizamón		(substituted in) 59'
SH	21	Tomás Cubelli		(substituted in) 61'
FH	22	Santiago González Iglesias		(substituted in) 21'
FB	23	Ramiro Moyano		(substituted in) 75'
Coach:
(Argentina) Daniel Hourcade

FB	15	Hugo Bonneval
RW	14	Xavier Mignot
OC	13	Julien Rey
IC	12	Jonathan Danty		(substituted off) 62'
LW	11	Djibril Camara
FH	10	Jules Plisson (c)
SH	9	Baptiste Serin		(substituted off) 71'
N8	8	Kevin Gourdon		(substituted off) 62'	(substituted in) 75'
OF	7	Raphaël Lakafia		(substituted off) 37'
BF	6	Loann Goujon
RL	5	William Demotte
LL	4	Julien Le Devedec
TP	3	Rabah Slimani		(substituted off) 50'
HK	2	Rémi Bonfils		(substituted off) 67'
LP	1	Jefferson Poirot	(yellow card) 60' to 70'		(substituted off) 75'
Replacements:
HK	16	Clément Maynadier		(substituted in) 67'
PR	17	Uini Atonio		(substituted in) 50'
PR	18	Lucas Pointud		(substituted in) 62'
LK	19	Fabrice Metz		(substituted in) 75'
N8	20	Louis Picamoles		(substituted in) 37'
SH	21	Sébastien Bezy		(substituted in) 71'
FH	22	François Trinh-Duc		(substituted in) 75'
CE	23	Gaël Fickou		(substituted in) 62'
Coach:
(France) Guy Novès

Touch judges:
Stuart Berry (South Africa)
Luke Pearce (England)
Television match official:
Johan Greeff (South Africa)

Notes:

- Rémi Bonfils, William Demotte, Kevin Gourdon, Julien Le Devedec, Clément Maynadier, Fabrice Metz, Xavier Mignot, Lucas Pointud, Julien Rey and Baptiste Serin (all France) made their international debuts.

24 June 2016
15:00 FJT (UTC+12)

Fiji	3–14	Georgia
Pen: Volavola (1/1) 12'	Report	Try: Khmaladze 41' m Pen: Kvirikashvili (3/5) 8', 55', 80+3'

ANZ National Stadium, Suva
Attendance: 1,025
Referee: JP Doyle (England)

Team details

FB	15	Benito Masilevu
RW	14	Savenaca Rawaca	(substituted off) 52'
OC	13	Adriu Delai	(substituted off) 52'
IC	12	Eroni Vasiteri
LW	11	Patrick Osborne
FH	10	Ben Volavola
SH	9	Nemia Kenatale	(substituted off) 74'
N8	8	Eremasi Radrodro	(substituted off) 56'
OF	7	Mosese Voka
BF	6	Naulia Dawai
RL	5	Tevita Cavubati
LL	4	Savenaca Tabakanalagi	(substituted off) 40'
TP	3	Taniela Koroi	(substituted off) 52'
HK	2	Sunia Koto (c)	(substituted off) 70'
LP	1	Peni Ravai	(substituted off) 56'
Replacements:
HK	16	Viliame Veikoso	(substituted in) 70'
PR	17	Campese Ma'afu	(substituted in) 56'
PR	18	Mesake Doge	(substituted in) 52'
FL	19	Nemia Soqeta	(substituted in) 40'
FL	20	Malakai Ravulo	(substituted in) 56'
SH	21	Henry Seniloli	(substituted in) 74'
FH	22	Seremaia Bai	(substituted in) 52'
CE	23	Vereniki Goneva	(substituted in) 52'
Coach:
(New Zealand) John McKee

FB	15	Merab Kvirikashvili
RW	14	Giorgi Pruidze
OC	13	Davit Kacharava
IC	12	Merab Sharikadze
LW	11	Tamaz Mchedlidze
FH	10	Lasha Khmaladze	(substituted off) 70'
SH	9	Giorgi Begadze
N8	8	Beka Bitsadze
OF	7	Giorgi Tkhilaishvili	(substituted off) 64'
BF	6	Shalva Sutiashvili (c)	(substituted off) 47'
RL	5	Giorgi Nemsadze
LL	4	Giorgi Chkhaidze	(substituted off) 75'
TP	3	Irakli Mirtskhulava	(substituted off) 59'
HK	2	Jaba Bregvadze	(substituted off) 59'
LP	1	Kakha Asieshvili	(substituted off) 56'
Replacements:
HK	16	Shalva Mamukashvili	(substituted in) 59'
PR	17	Zurab Zhvania	(substituted in) 56'
PR	18	Nika Khatiashvili	(substituted in) 69'
LK	19	Nodar Tcheishvili	(substituted in) 75'
N8	20	Lasha Lomidze	(substituted in) 47'
SH	21	Vazha Khutsishvili
FH	22	Lasha Malaghuradze	(substituted in) 70'
FL	23	Saba Shubitidze	(substituted in) 64'
Coach:
(New Zealand) Milton Haig

Touch judges:
George Clancy (Ireland)
James Leckie (Australia)

Notes:

- Mesake Doge and Savenaca Rawaca (both Fiji) made their international debuts.
- This was Georgia's first ever win over Fiji.
- With this win, Georgia has beaten all 12 tier 2 nations.

25 June 2016
19:35 NZST (UTC+12)

New Zealand	46–6	Wales
Try: B. Smith 23' m Moala 34' c Barrett (2) 44' c, 56' c Coles 62' c Dagg 80' c Con: Barrett (5/6) 35', 45', 58', 63', 80'; Pen: Barrett (2/2) 16', 27'	Report	Pen: Biggar (2/2) 6', 18'

Forsyth Barr Stadium, Dunedin
Referee: Jérôme Garcès (France)

Team details

FB	15	Israel Dagg
RW	14	Ben Smith
OC	13	George Moala		(substituted off) 48'
IC	12	Ryan Crotty		(substituted off) 55'
LW	11	Julian Savea
FH	10	Beauden Barrett
SH	9	Aaron Smith		(substituted off) 71'
N8	8	Kieran Read (c)
OF	7	Sam Cane	(yellow card) 46' to 56'
BF	6	Elliot Dixon		(substituted off) 55'
RL	5	Sam Whitelock
LL	4	Brodie Retallick		(substituted off) 65'
TP	3	Charlie Faumuina		(substituted off) 53'
HK	2	Dane Coles		(substituted off) 71'
LP	1	Joe Moody		(substituted off) 53'
Replacements:
HK	16	Codie Taylor		(substituted in) 71'
PR	17	Wyatt Crockett		(substituted in) 53'
PR	18	Ofa Tu'ungafasi		(substituted in) 53'
LK	19	Luke Romano		(substituted in) 65'
FL	20	Liam Squire		(substituted in) 55'
SH	21	Tawera Kerr-Barlow		(substituted in) 71'
FH	22	Lima Sopoaga		(substituted in) 55'
WG	23	Waisake Naholo		(substituted in) 48'
Coach:
(New Zealand) Steve Hansen

FB	15	Rhys Patchell
RW	14	Liam Williams	31' to 38'
OC	13	Jonathan Davies
IC	12	Jamie Roberts			(substituted off) 54'
LW	11	Hallam Amos
FH	10	Dan Biggar	(substituted off) 59'
SH	9	Rhys Webb	(substituted off) 55'
N8	8	Taulupe Faletau
OF	7	Sam Warburton (c)	(substituted off) 70'
BF	6	Ross Moriarty
RL	5	Alun Wyn Jones
LL	4	Luke Charteris	(substituted off) 59'
TP	3	Tomas Francis	(substituted off) 47'
HK	2	Ken Owens	(substituted off) 57'
LP	1	Rob Evans	(substituted off) 47'
Replacements:
HK	16	Scott Baldwin	(substituted in) 57'
PR	17	Aaron Jarvis	(substituted in) 47'
PR	18	Samson Lee	(substituted in) 47'
LK	19	Jake Ball	(substituted in) 59'
FL	20	Ellis Jenkins	(substituted in) 70'
SH	21	Gareth Davies	(substituted in) 55'
FH	22	Rhys Priestland	(substituted in) 59'
CE	23	Scott Williams	(substituted in) 31'	(substituted off) 38'	(substituted in) 54'
Coach:
(New Zealand) Warren Gatland

Man of the Match:
Beauden Barrett (New Zealand)

Touch judges:
Jaco Peyper (South Africa)
Andrew Lees (Australia)
Television match official:
George Ayoub (Australia)

Notes:

- Elliot Dixon, Liam Squire and Ofa Tu'ungafasi (all New Zealand) made their international debuts.
- Brodie Retallick and Aaron Smith (both New Zealand) earned their 50th test caps.

25 June 2016
20:00 AEST (UTC+10)

Australia	40–44	England
Try: Foley 12' c Haylett-Petty 20' m Hooper 50' c Folau 57' c Naiyaravoro 80' m Con: Foley (3/5) 13', 51', 58'; Pen: Foley (3/4) 27', 40', 71'	Report	Try: Cole 10' c Brown 29' c B. Vunipola 43' m George 66' c Con: Farrell (3/4) 11', 30', 67'; Pen: Farrell (6/6) 25', 47', 55', 61', 69', 79'

Sydney Football Stadium, Sydney
Attendance: 44,063
Referee: Nigel Owens (Wales)

Team details

FB	15	Israel Folau
RW	14	Dane Haylett-Petty
OC	13	Tevita Kuridrani
IC	12	Matt To'omua	(substituted off) 67'
LW	11	Rob Horne	(substituted off) 67'
FH	10	Bernard Foley
SH	9	Nick Phipps
N8	8	Sean McMahon
OF	7	Michael Hooper
BF	6	Scott Fardy
RL	5	Rob Simmons	(substituted off) 40'
LL	4	Will Skelton	(substituted off) 51'
TP	3	Sekope Kepu	(substituted off) 58'
HK	2	Stephen Moore (c)	(substituted off) 62'
LP	1	James Slipper	(substituted off) 58'
Replacements:
HK	16	Tatafu Polota-Nau	(substituted in) 62'
PR	17	Scott Sio	(substituted in) 58'
PR	18	Greg Holmes	(substituted in) 58'
LK	19	Adam Coleman	(substituted in) 40'
N8	20	Wycliff Palu	(substituted in) 51'
SH	21	Nick Frisby
FH	22	Christian Lealiifano	(substituted in) 67'
WG	23	Taqele Naiyaravoro	(substituted in) 67'
Coach:
(Australia) Michael Cheika

FB	15	Mike Brown
RW	14	Anthony Watson
OC	13	Jonathan Joseph
IC	12	Owen Farrell
LW	11	Jack Nowell
FH	10	George Ford
SH	9	Ben Youngs	(substituted off) 53'
N8	8	Billy Vunipola	(substituted off) 74'
OF	7	Teimana Harrison	(substituted off) 31'
BF	6	Chris Robshaw	(substituted off) 53'
RL	5	George Kruis	(substituted off) 61'
LL	4	Maro Itoje
TP	3	Dan Cole	(substituted off) 67'
HK	2	Dylan Hartley (c)	(substituted off) 63'
LP	1	Mako Vunipola	(substituted off) 79'
Replacements:
HK	16	Jamie George	(substituted in) 63'
PR	17	Matt Mullan	(substituted in) 79'
PR	18	Paul Hill	(substituted in) 67'
LK	19	Joe Launchbury	(substituted in) 61'
LK	20	Courtney Lawes	(substituted in) 31'
FL	21	Jack Clifford (rugby)	(substituted in) 53'
SH	22	Danny Care	(substituted in) 53'
CE	23	Elliot Daly	(substituted in) 74'
Coach:
(Australia) Eddie Jones

Man of the Match:
Owen Farrell (England)

Touch judges:
Craig Joubert (South Africa)
Mike Fraser (New Zealand)
Television match official:
Ben Skeen (New Zealand)

Notes:

- Adam Coleman (Australia) made his international debut.
- England score their most points against Australia in Australia, surpassing the 39 points scored in the first test of this test series.
- Australia lose 3–0 for the first time since they lost their three-test series to South Africa in 1971.

25 June 2016
19:20 JST (UTC+09)

Japan	16–21	Scotland
Try: Shigeno 20' c Con: Tamura (1/1) 21'; Pen: Tamura (3/3) 6', 29', 49'	Report	Pen: Pyrgos (3/4) 2', 15', 25'; Laidlaw (4/4) 52', 60', 70', 77'

Ajinomoto Stadium, Chōfu
Attendance: 34,073
Referee: Marius Mitrea (Italy)

Team details

FB	15	Rikiya Matsuda	(substituted off) 77'
RW	14	Male Sa'u
OC	13	Tim Bennetts	(substituted off) 55'
IC	12	Harumichi Tatekawa
LW	11	Yasutaka Sasakura
FH	10	Yu Tamura
SH	9	Kaito Shigeno	(substituted off) 61'
N8	8	Amanaki Mafi
OF	7	Shokei Kin
BF	6	Hendrik Tui	(substituted off) 60'
RL	5	Naohiro Kotaki
LL	4	Hitoshi Ono	(substituted off) 65'
TP	3	Kensuke Hatakeyama	(substituted off) 55'
HK	2	Shota Horie (c)	(substituted off) 60'
LP	1	Keita Inagaki	(substituted off) 71'
Replacements:
HK	16	Takeshi Kizu	(substituted in) 60'
PR	17	Masataka Mikami	(substituted in) 71'
PR	18	Shinnosuke Kakinaga	(substituted in) 55'
LK	19	Kotaro Yatabe	(substituted in) 65'
N8	20	Koliniasi Holani	(substituted in) 60'
SH	21	Keisuke Uchida	(substituted in) 61'
FH	22	Kosei Ono	(substituted in) 55'
CE	23	Mifiposeti Paea	(substituted in) 77'
Coach:
(New Zealand) Mark Hammett

FB	15	Stuart Hogg
RW	14	Tommy Seymour
OC	13	Matt Scott
IC	12	Peter Horne
LW	11	Sean Maitland	(substituted off) 79'
FH	10	Ruaridh Jackson	(substituted off) 57'
SH	9	Henry Pyrgos (c)	(substituted off) 49'
N8	8	Ryan Wilson	(substituted off) 44'
OF	7	John Barclay	(substituted off) 67'
BF	6	Josh Strauss
RL	5	Jonny Gray
LL	4	Richie Gray
TP	3	Moray Low	(substituted off) 40'
HK	2	Stuart McInally	(substituted off) 40'
LP	1	Rory Sutherland	(substituted off) 40'
Replacements:
HK	16	Fraser Brown	(substituted in) 40'
PR	17	Gordon Reid	(substituted in) 40'
PR	18	WP Nel	(substituted in) 40'
LK	19	Tim Swinson	(substituted in) 67'
FL	20	John Hardie	(substituted in) 44'
SH	21	Greig Laidlaw	(substituted in) 49'
CE	22	Huw Jones	(substituted in) 57'
WG	23	Sean Lamont	(substituted in) 79'
Coach:
(New Zealand) Vern Cotter

Touch judges:
Ben O'Keeffe (New Zealand)
Brendan Pickerill (New Zealand)
Television match official:
Ian Smith (Australia)

Notes:

- Huw Jones (Scotland) made his international debut.
- The 34,073 crowd was a record home crowd for a Japanese rugby international.

25 June 2016
17:00 SAST (UTC+02)

South Africa	19–13	Ireland
Try: Pietersen 39' c Con: Jantjies (1/1) 40'; Pen: Jantjies (3/4) 5', 31', 68'; Combrinck (1/1) 59'	Report	Try: Marshall 15' c Con: Jackson (1/1) 16'; Pen: Jackson (2/3) 22', 69'

Nelson Mandela Bay Stadium, Port Elizabeth
Attendance: 42,324
Referee: Glen Jackson (New Zealand)

Team details

FB	15	Willie le Roux	(yellow card) 10' to 20'
RW	14	Ruan Combrinck
OC	13	Lionel Mapoe
IC	12	Damian de Allende
LW	11	JP Pietersen
FH	10	Elton Jantjies
SH	9	Faf de Klerk
N8	8	Warren Whiteley
OF	7	Siya Kolisi		(substituted off) 60'
BF	6	Francois Louw
RL	5	Pieter-Steph du Toit
LL	4	Eben Etzebeth		(substituted off) 73'
TP	3	Frans Malherbe		(substituted off) 56'
HK	2	Adriaan Strauss (c)		(substituted off) 78'
LP	1	Tendai Mtawarira		(substituted off) 56'
Replacements:
HK	16	Bongi Mbonambi		(substituted in) 78'
PR	17	Steven Kitshoff		(substituted in) 56'
PR	18	Julian Redelinghuys		(substituted in) 56'
LK	19	Franco Mostert		(substituted in) 73'
FL	20	Jaco Kriel		(substituted in) 60'
SH	21	Rudy Paige
FH	22	Morné Steyn
WG	23	Lwazi Mvovo
Coach:
(South Africa) Allister Coetzee

FB	15	Tiernan O'Halloran	(substituted off) 10'	(substituted in) 18'	(substituted off) 40'
RW	14	Andrew Trimble
OC	13	Luke Marshall
IC	12	Stuart Olding
LW	11	Keith Earls	(substituted off) 72'
FH	10	Paddy Jackson
SH	9	Conor Murray	(substituted off) 68'
N8	8	Jamie Heaslip
OF	7	Jordi Murphy
BF	6	CJ Stander	(substituted off) 68'
RL	5	Devin Toner
LL	4	Iain Henderson	(substituted off) 68'
TP	3	Mike Ross	(substituted off) 50'
HK	2	Rory Best (c)	(substituted off) 72'
LP	1	Jack McGrath
Replacements:
HK	16	Sean Cronin	(substituted in) 72'
PR	17	Finlay Bealham
PR	18	Tadhg Furlong	(substituted in) 50'
LK	19	Ultan Dillane	(substituted in) 68'
FL	20	Rhys Ruddock	(substituted in) 68'
SH	21	Eoin Reddan	(substituted in) 68'
FH	22	Ian Madigan	(substituted in) 72'
WG	23	Matt Healy	(substituted in) 10'	(substituted off) 18'	(substituted in) 40'
Coach:
(New Zealand) Joe Schmidt

Man of the Match:
JP Pietersen (South Africa)

Touch judges:
Angus Gardner (Australia)
Ben Whitehouse (Wales)
Television match official:
Rowan Kitt (England)

Notes:

- Steven Kitshoff, Jaco Kriel and Bongi Mbonambi (all South Africa) and Matt Healy (Ireland) made their international debuts.
- Conor Murray (Ireland) earned his 50th test cap.
- This was Eoin Reddan's last international after announcing his retirement from the professional game.

25 June 2016
15:10 ART (UTC-03)

Argentina	0–27	France
	Report	Try: Bonneval 38' c Lamerat 50' c Goujon 62' c Con: Serin (3/3) 39', 51', 62'; Pen: Serin (2/2) 25', 44'

Estadio Monumental José Fierro, Tucumán
Referee: Wayne Barnes (England)

Team details

FB	15	Joaquín Tuculet
RW	14	Santiago Cordero		(substituted off) 63'
OC	13	Matías Moroni		(substituted off) 67'
IC	12	Jerónimo de la Fuente
LW	11	Manuel Montero
FH	10	Nicolás Sánchez
SH	9	Tomás Cubelli		(substituted off) 58'
N8	8	Facundo Isa		(substituted off) 54'
OF	7	Javier Ortega Desio
BF	6	Pablo Matera		(substituted off) 51'
RL	5	Tomás Lavanini	(yellow card) 62' to 72'
LL	4	Guido Petti
TP	3	Ramiro Herrera		(substituted off) 71'
HK	2	Agustín Creevy (c)		(substituted off) 58'
LP	1	Nahuel Tetaz Chaparro		(substituted off) 63'
Replacements:
HK	16	Julián Montoya		(substituted in) 58'
PR	17	Santiago García Botta		(substituted in) 63'
PR	18	Enrique Pieretto		(substituted in) 71'
FL	19	Tomás Lezana		(substituted in) 51'
FL	20	Juan Manuel Leguizamón		(substituted in) 54'
SH	21	Martín Landajo		(substituted in) 58'
CE	22	Matías Orlando		(substituted in) 67'
WG	23	Lucas González Amorosino		(substituted in) 63'
Coach:
(Argentina) Daniel Hourcade

FB	15	Maxime Médard
RW	14	Hugo Bonneval
OC	13	Gaël Fickou
IC	12	Rémi Lamerat
LW	11	Djibril Camara	(substituted off) 35'
FH	10	François Trinh-Duc	(substituted off) 72'
SH	9	Baptiste Serin	(substituted off) 63'
N8	8	Louis Picamoles
OF	7	Kevin Gourdon	(substituted off) 69'
BF	6	Loann Goujon
RL	5	Yoann Maestri (c)
LL	4	Julien Le Devedec	65' to 75'
TP	3	Uini Atonio	(substituted off) 56'
HK	2	Rémi Bonfils	(substituted off) 65'
LP	1	Jefferson Poirot	(substituted off) 69'
Replacements:
HK	16	Clément Maynadier	(substituted in) 65'
PR	17	Lucas Pointud	(substituted in) 69'
PR	18	Rabah Slimani	(substituted in) 56'
LK	19	Paul Jedrasiak	(substituted in) 65'
FL	20	Kélian Galletier	(substituted in) 69'	(substituted off) 75'
SH	21	Sébastien Bezy	(substituted in) 63'
FH	22	Jules Plisson	(substituted in) 72'
CE	23	Julien Rey	(substituted in) 35'
Coach:
(France) Guy Novès

Touch judges:
John Lacey (Ireland)
Luke Pearce (England)
Television match official:
Johan Greeff (South Africa)

Notes:

- Kélian Galletier (France) made his international debut.
- Lucas González Amorosino (Argentina) earned his 50th test cap.
- Xavier Mignot was named to start, but was replaced with Hugo Bonneval before kick-off due to injury.
- This is the first time Argentina has failed to score any points in a test match since they lost 16–0 against Ireland in 2007. It is the first time they have failed to score any points against France since their first ever meeting in 1949.

25 June 2016
19:00 PDT (UTC-07)

United States	25–0	Russia
Try: Te'o 64' c Con: MacGinty (1/1) 65'; Pen: MacGinty (6/6) 10', 14', 28', 36', 40', 44'	Report

Bonney Field, Sacramento
Referee: Matthew Carley (England)

Team details

FB	15	Will Holder	(substituted off) 40'
RW	14	Mike Te'o
OC	13	Thretton Palamo	(substituted off) 51'
IC	12	Shalom Suniula
LW	11	Blaine Scully (c)
FH	10	AJ MacGinty
SH	9	Nate Augspurger	(substituted off) 66'
N8	8	Cam Dolan
OF	7	Tony Lamborn	(substituted off) 60'
BF	6	Todd Clever
RL	5	Nate Brakeley
LL	4	James King	(substituted off) 72'
TP	3	Chris Baumann	(substituted off) 67'
HK	2	James Hilterbrand	(substituted off) 51'
LP	1	Titi Lamositele	(substituted off) 60'
Replacements:
HK	16	Joe Taufete'e	(substituted in) 51'
PR	17	Ben Tarr	(substituted in) 67'
PR	18	Angus MacLellan	(substituted in) 60'
FL	19	Harry Higgins	(substituted in) 72'
N8	20	Langilangi Haupeakui	(substituted in) 60'
SH	21	Stephen Tomasin	(substituted in) 66'
CE	22	Chad London	(substituted in) 51'
WG	23	Luke Hume	(substituted in) 40'
Coach:
(New Zealand) John Mitchell

FB	15	Ramil Gaisin		(substituted off) 48'
RW	14	Denis Simplikevich
OC	13	Kirill Golosnitskiy		(substituted off) 48'
IC	12	Dimitry Gerasimov
LW	11	Vasily Artemyev (c)
FH	10	Yuri Kushnarev
SH	9	Ruslan Yagudin		(substituted off) 44'
N8	8	Anton Rudoy
OF	7	Pavel Butenko		(substituted off) 48'
BF	6	Victor Gresev
RL	5	Denis Antonov		(substituted off) 58'
LL	4	Andrei Garbuzov	(yellow card) 47' to 57'
TP	3	Evgeni Pronenko		(substituted off) 53'
HK	2	Evgeni Matveev		(substituted off) 44'
LP	1	Alexei Volkov		(substituted off) 44'
Replacements:
HK	16	Nazir Gasanov		(substituted in) 44'
PR	17	Azamat Bitiev		(substituted in) 44'
PR	18	Vladimir Podrezov		(substituted in) 53'
LK	19	Evgeny Yolgin		(substituted in) 58'
FL	20	Danila Chegodaev		(substituted in) 48'
SH	21	Alexei Shcherban		(substituted in) 44'
CE	22	Evgeni Kolomiytsev		(substituted in) 48'
FB	23	Anton Ryabov		(substituted in) 48'
Coach:
(Russia) Alexander Pervukhin

Touch judges:
Marius van der Westhuizen (South Africa)
Chris Assmus (Canada)
Television match official:
Graham Hughes (England)

Notes:

- Langilangi Haupeakui, Harry Higgins and Stephen Tomasin (all United States) and Kirill Golosnitskiy (Russia) made their international debuts.
- Todd Clever earned his 58th test cap to become the Eagles most capped player, surpassing Mike MacDonald.

26 June 2016
12:00 EDT (UTC-04)

Canada	18–20	Italy
Pen: McRorie (6/6) 11', 23', 31', 47', 53', 66'		Try: Gega 59' m Pen: Allan (4/5) 7', 15', 34', 50'; Canna (1/1) 71'

BMO Field, Toronto
Referee: Alexandre Ruiz (France)

Team details

FB	15	Matt Evans
RW	14	Dan Moor
OC	13	Ciaran Hearn	(yellow card) 25' to 35'
IC	12	Nick Blevins
LW	11	Taylor Paris
FH	10	Pat Parfrey		(substituted off) 58'
SH	9	Gordon McRorie
N8	8	Aaron Carpenter
OF	7	Lucas Rumball
BF	6	Kyle Baillie		(substituted off) 68'
RL	5	Evan Olmstead		50' to 60'
LL	4	Jamie Cudmore (c)			(substituted off) 60'
TP	3	Jake Ilnicki
HK	2	Ray Barkwill		(substituted off) 68'
LP	1	Djustice Sears-Duru		(substituted off) 62'	(substituted in) 75'
Replacements:
HK	16	Eric Howard		(substituted in) 68'
PR	17	Tom Dolezel		(substituted in) 62'	(substituted off) 75'
PR	18	Matt Tierney
LK	19	Paul Ciulini		(substituted in) 50'
FL	20	Matt Heaton		(substituted in) 68'
SH	21	Jamie Mackenzie
FH	22	Liam Underwood		(substituted in) 58'
FB	23	Brock Staller
Coach:
(New Zealand) Mark Anscombe

FB	15	David Odiete
RW	14	Angelo Esposito
OC	13	Michele Campagnaro
IC	12	Tommaso Boni
LW	11	Giovanbattista Venditti
FH	10	Tommaso Allan		(substituted off) 60'
SH	9	Edoardo Gori (c)		(substituted off) 60'
N8	8	Dries van Schalkwyk
OF	7	Simone Favaro
BF	6	Maxime Mbanda		(substituted off) 66'
RL	5	Marco Fuser
LL	4	Quintin Geldenhuys
TP	3	Lorenzo Cittadini		(substituted off) 54'
HK	2	Ornel Gega		(substituted off) 73'
LP	1	Andrea Lovotti		(substituted off) 54'
Replacements:
HK	16	Tommaso D'Apice		(substituted in) 73'
PR	17	Sami Panico		(substituted in) 54'
PR	18	Pietro Ceccarelli		(substituted in) 54'
FL	19	Sebastian Negri		(substituted in) 66'
FL	20	Jacopo Sarto
SH	21	Guglielmo Palazzani		(substituted in) 60'
FH	22	Carlo Canna	(yellow card) 75' to 80'	(substituted in) 60'
CE	23	Giulio Bisegni
Coach:
(Ireland) Conor O'Shea

Touch judges:
Shuhei Kubo (Japan)
Ed Gardner (United States)
Television match official:
Andrew Hosie (Canada)

Notes:

- Ciaran Hearn (Canada) and Lorenzo Cittadini (Italy) earned their 50th test caps.

== See also ==
- Mid-year rugby union tests
- End-of-year rugby union tests
- 2016 Africa Cup
- 2016 World Rugby Nations Cup
- 2016 Asian Rugby Championship
- 2016 World Rugby Pacific Nations Cup
- 2016 Sudamérica Rugby Cup
- 2016 end-of-year rugby union internationals
