= 2016 World Rugby Pacific Nations Cup =

Tournament details
- Countries: Fiji; Samoa; Tonga
- Tournament format(s): Round-robin
- Date: 11–25 June 2016

Tournament statistics
- Teams: 3
- Matches played: 3
- Tries scored: 12 (4 per match)
- Top point scorer(s): (Fiji) Seremaia Bai (24)
- Top try scorer(s): 8 players with 1 try

Final
- Champions: Fiji (3rd title)

The 2016 World Rugby Pacific Nations Cup was the eleventh edition of the World Rugby Pacific Nations Cup (formerly known as the IRB Pacific Nations Cup), an annual international rugby union tournament. The 2016 title was contested by the Pacific nations of Fiji, Samoa and Tonga. Fiji won title and was undefeated in the two matches the team played.

Teams competing in previous years, Canada, Japan and the United States were not scheduled to participate in the tournament for 2016 and 2017 due to the 2019 Rugby World Cup qualifying format. The top two teams on aggregate across the 2016 and 2017 Pacific Nations Cups qualified for Japan 2019, with the team finishing third scheduled to enter the repechage for qualification.

== Table ==
Pos	Team	Pld	W	D	L	PF	PA	PD	TF	TA	TB	LB	Pts
1	Fiji	2	2	0	0	49	34	+15	5	3	0	0	8
2	Samoa	2	1	0	1	46	36	+10	4	3	0	0	4
3	Tonga	2	0	0	2	28	53	−25	3	6	0	1	1

Rules for classification: 4 points for a win, 2 points for a draw, 1 bonus point for a loss by seven points or less, 1 bonus point for scoring four or more tries in a match

== Fixtures ==
The full match schedule was announced on 19 February 2015.

=== Round 1 ===
11 June 2016
15:00 FJT (UTC+12)

Fiji	23–18	Tonga
Try: Volavola 45' c Soqeta 50' m Radrodro 74' m Con: Bai (1/3) 46'; Pen: Bai (2/2) 58', 71'	Report	Try: Iongi 27' c Takulua 30' m Con: Takulua (1/2) 28'; Pen: Takulua (2/2) 20', 56'

ANZ National Stadium, Suva
Attendance: 2,000
Referee: Nigel Owens (Wales)

FB	15	Samisoni Viriviri
RW	14	Patrick Osborne	(substituted off) 53'
OC	13	Vereniki Goneva
IC	12	Seremaia Bai
LW	11	Adriu Delai	(substituted off) 67'
FH	10	Ben Volavola
SH	9	Nemia Kenatale	(substituted off) 66'
N8	8	Nemia Soqeta	(substituted off) 55'
OF	7	Malakai Ravulo	(substituted off) 12'
BF	6	Naulia Dawai
RL	5	Leone Nakarawa
LL	4	Tevita Cavubati
TP	3	Lee Roy Atalifo	(substituted off) 67'
HK	2	Sunia Koto (c)
LP	1	Campese Ma'afu	(substituted off) 74'
Replacements:
HK	16	Viliame Veikoso
PR	17	Peni Ravai	(substituted in) 74'
PR	18	Taniela Koroi	(substituted in) 67'
LK	19	Savenaca Tabakanalagi	(substituted in) 55'
N8	20	Eremasi Radrodro	(substituted in) 12'
SH	21	Henry Seniloli	(substituted in) 66'
SH	22	Serupepeli Vularika	(substituted in) 67'
WG	23	Benito Masilevu	(substituted in) 53'
Coach:
(New Zealand) John McKee

FB	15	David Halaifonua	(yellow card) 34' to 45'
RW	14	Viliame Iongi
OC	13	Nafi Tuitavake		(substituted off) 26'
IC	12	Viliami Hakalo		(substituted off) 67'
LW	11	Daniel Kilioni
FH	10	Latiume Fosita
SH	9	Sonatane Takulua
N8	8	Sione Kalamafoni		(substituted off) 40'
OF	7	Jack Ram
BF	6	Nili Latu (c)
RL	5	Uili Koloʻofai
LL	4	Daniel Faleafa		(substituted off) 67'
TP	3	Sione Faletau		(substituted off) 53'
HK	2	Elvis Taione		(substituted off) 60'
LP	1	Eddie Aholelei		(substituted off) 58'	(substituted in) 73'
Replacements:
HK	16	Sione Anga’aelangi		(substituted in) 60'
PR	17	Kama Sakalia		(substituted in) 58'	(substituted off) 73'
PR	18	Fusi Malimali		(substituted in) 53'
FL	19	Opeti Fonua		(substituted in) 67'
FL	20	Sione Tau		(substituted in) 40'
SH	21	Wayne Ngaluafe
CE	22	Apakuki Ma'afu		(substituted in) 26'
FB	23	Kali Hala		(substituted in) 67'
Coach:
(Australia) Toutai Kefu

Touch judges:
Mike Fraser (New Zealand)
Brendan Pickerill (New Zealand)

Notes:

- Naulia Dawai, Patrick Osborne, Eremasi Radrodro, Savenaca Tabakanalagi, Samisoni Viriviri and Serupepeli Vularika (all Fiji) and Sione Anga’aelangi, Sione Faletau, Kali Hala, Daniel Kilioni, Apakuki Ma'afu, Fusi Malimali, Sione Tau and Nafi Tuitavake (all Tonga) made their international debuts.
- Referee Nigel Owens refereed his 71st game, surpassing Jonathan Kaplan's 70-games refereed record set in 2013.

=== Round 2 ===
18 June 2016
15:00 FJT (UTC+12)

Fiji	26–16	Samoa
Try: Koto 39' c Osborne 77' c Con: Bai (2/2) 40', 78'; Pen: Bai (4/4) 2', 41', 46', 62'	Report	Try: Matu'u 33' c Con: Pisi (1/1) 34'; Pen: Pisi (3/4) 6', 22', 27'

ANZ National Stadium, Suva
Attendance: 2,063
Referee: George Clancy (Ireland)

FB	15	Samisoni Viriviri
RW	14	Waisea Nayacalevu	(yellow card) 26' to 36'
OC	13	Vereniki Goneva
IC	12	Eroni Vasiteri		(substituted off) 52'
LW	11	Patrick Osborne
FH	10	Seremaia Bai
SH	9	Henry Seniloli		(substituted off) 51'
N8	8	Eremasi Radrodro
OF	7	Naulia Dawai
BF	6	Leone Nakarawa		(substituted off) 78'
RL	5	Tevita Cavubati
LL	4	Api Ratuniyarawa		(substituted off) 49'
TP	3	Lee Roy Atalifo		(substituted off) 63'
HK	2	Sunia Koto (c)
LP	1	Campese Ma'afu		(substituted off) 70'
Replacements:
HK	16	Viliame Veikoso
PR	17	Peni Ravai		(substituted in) 70'
PR	18	Taniela Koroi		(substituted in) 63'
FL	19	Nemia Soqeta		(substituted in) 49'
N8	20	Mosese Voka		(substituted in) 78'
SH	21	Serupepeli Vularika		(substituted in) 51'
FH	22	Ben Volavola		(substituted in) 52'
WG	23	Benito Masilevu
Coach:
(New Zealand) John McKee

FB	15	Albert Nikoro
RW	14	Fa'atoina Autagavaia
OC	13	Rey Lee-Lo
IC	12	Faialaga Afamasaga
LW	11	David Lemi (c)
FH	10	Tusi Pisi	(substituted off) 49'
SH	9	Dwayne Polataivao	(substituted off) 58'
N8	8	Alafoti Fa'osiliva
OF	7	Greg Foe
BF	6	Faifili Levave	(substituted off) 47'
RL	5	Filo Paulo
LL	4	Fa'atiga Lemalu
TP	3	James Johnston	(substituted off) 30'
HK	2	Motu Matu'u	(substituted off) 47'
LP	1	Sakaria Taulafo	(substituted off) 69'
Replacements:
HK	16	Manu Leiataua	(substituted in) 47'
PR	17	Sam Aiono	(substituted in) 30'
PR	18	Census Johnston	(substituted in) 69'
FL	19	Jeff Lepa
N8	20	TJ Ioane	(substituted in) 47'
SH	21	Pele Cowley	(substituted in) 58'
FH	22	Patrick Fa'apale	(substituted in) 49'
WG	23	Malu Falaniko
Coach:
(New Zealand) Alama Ieremia

Touch judges:
JP Doyle (Ireland)
James Leckie (Australia)

Notes:

- Eroni Vasiteri (Fiji) and Greg Foe (Samoa) made their international debuts.

=== Round 3 ===
25 June 2016
15:00 WST (UTC+13)

Samoa	30–10	Tonga
Try: Penalty try 7' c Lepa 11' c Tusitala 77' c Con: Fa'apale (2/2) 9', 11'; Leuila (1/1) 78'; Pen: Fa'apale (3/5) 16', 29', 33'	Report	Try: Fonua 61' c Con: Takulua (1/1) 61'; Pen: Takulua (1/2) 13'

Apia Park, Apia
Attendance: 5,500
Referee: Pascal Gaüzère (France)

FB	15	Malu Falaniko
RW	14	Fa'atoina Autagavaia
OC	13	Paul Perez
IC	12	Rey Lee-Lo
LW	11	David Lemi (c)
FH	10	Patrick Fa'apale		(substituted off) 40'
SH	9	Pele Cowley		(substituted off) 55'
N8	8	Alafoti Fa'osiliva		(substituted off) 68'
OF	7	Greg Foe
BF	6	Faifili Levave		(substituted off) 55'
RL	5	Fa'atiga Lemalu
LL	4	Jeff Lepa		(substituted off) 49'
TP	3	Census Johnston		(substituted off) 40'
HK	2	Manu Leiataua		(substituted off) 49'
LP	1	Sakaria Taulafo
Replacements:
HK	16	Seilala Lam		(substituted in) 49'
PR	17	Sam Aiono		(substituted in) 68'
PR	18	Viliamu Afatia	(yellow card) 65' to 75'	(substituted in) 40'
LK	19	Filo Paulo		(substituted in) 49'
N8	20	TJ Ioane		(substituted in) 55'
WG	21	Danny Tusitala		(substituted in) 55'
FB	22	D'Angelo Leuila		(substituted in) 40'
FB	23	Albert Nikoro
Coach:
(New Zealand) Alama Ieremia

FB	15	David Halaifonua	(yellow card) 44' to 54'
RW	14	Otulea Katoa	(yellow card) 7' to 17'
OC	13	Apakuki Ma'afu
IC	12	Latiume Fosita
LW	11	Viliame Iongi
FH	10	Martin Naufahu		(substituted off) 40'
SH	9	Sonatane Takulua
N8	8	Sione Kalamafoni
OF	7	Jack Ram		(substituted off) 35'
BF	6	Nili Latu (c)
RL	5	Uili Koloʻofai		(substituted off) 50'
LL	4	Daniel Faleafa
TP	3	Sila Puafisi		(substituted off) 68'
HK	2	Elvis Taione		(substituted off) 70'
LP	1	Kama Sakalia		(substituted off) 68'
Replacements:
HK	16	Sione Anga’aelangi		(substituted in) 70'
PR	17	Eddie Aholelei		(substituted in) 68'
PR	18	Sione Faletau		(substituted in) 68'
FL	19	Opeti Fonua		(substituted in) 50'
FL	20	Sione Tau		(substituted in) 35'
SH	21	Wayne Ngaluafe
FB	22	Viliami Hakalo		(substituted in) 40'
WG	23	Daniel Kilioni
Coach:
(Australia) Toutai Kefu

Touch judges:
JP Doyle (Ireland)
James Leckie (Australia)

Notes:

- Martin Naufahu (Tonga) made his international debut.

== Squads ==
Nation	Head coach	Captain
Fiji	(New Zealand) John McKee	Sunia Koto
Samoa	(New Zealand) Alama Ieremia	David Lemi
Tonga	(Australia) Toutai Kefu	Nili Latu

Note: Number of caps and players' ages are indicated as of 11 June 2016 – the tournament's opening day, pre first tournament match.

=== Fiji ===
On 20 May, Head Coach John McKee announced a 28-man squad for the Pacific Nations Cup and their June test against Georgia.

On 7 June, Samisoni Viriviri joined the squad.

Winger Adriu Delai and lock Savenaca Tabakanalagi were late additions to the squad ahead of the Tongan fixture on 11 June.

Player	Position	Date of birth (age)	Caps	Club/province
Sunia Koto (c)	Hooker	15 April 1980 (aged 36)	46	(France) Narbonne
Jale Sassen	Hooker	6 September 1992 (aged 23)	0	(Fiji) Suva
Viliame Veikoso	Hooker	4 April 1982 (aged 34)	32	(England) Doncaster
Lee Roy Atalifo	Prop	10 March 1988 (aged 28)	4	(Italy) Rovigo Delta
Mesake Doge	Prop	1 April 1993 (aged 23)	0	(Fiji) Naitasiri
Taniela Koroi	Prop	February 8, 1990 (aged 26)	3	(Italy) Mogliano
Campese Ma'afu	Prop	19 December 1984 (aged 31)	39	(France) Provence
Peni Ravai	Prop	16 June 1990 (aged 25)	13	(Fiji) Nadroga
Tevita Cavubati	Lock	12 August 1987 (aged 28)	12	(England) Worcester
Leone Nakarawa	Lock	2 April 1988 (aged 28)	35	(Scotland) Glasgow Warriors
Savenaca Tabakanalagi	Lock	31 August 1986 (aged 29)	0	(France) Strasbourg
Api Ratuniyarawa	Lock	11 July 1986 (aged 29)	18	(France) Agen
Malakai Ravulo	Flanker	22 September 1983 (aged 32)	36	(Romania) Steaua București
Nemia Soqeta	Flanker	4 March 1985 (aged 31)	9	(France) Biarritz Olympique
Dominiko Waqaniburotu	Flanker	20 April 1986 (aged 30)	27	(France) Brive
Eremasi Radrodro	Number 8		0	(Fiji) Nadroga
Nemia Kenatale	Scrum-half	21 January 1986 (aged 30)	37	(Romania) Farul Constanța
Henry Seniloli	Scrum-half	15 June 1989 (aged 26)	10	(Fiji) Tailevu
Serupepeli Vularika	Scrum-half		0	(Fiji) Suva
Seremaia Bai	Fly-half	4 January 1979 (aged 37)	50	(England) Leicester Tigers
Ben Volavola	Fly-half	13 January 1991 (aged 25)	9	(New Zealand) Crusaders
Vereniki Goneva	Centre	5 April 1984 (aged 32)	39	(England) Leicester Tigers
John Stewart	Centre	17 February 1988 (aged 28)	0	(Japan) Sunwolves
Eroni Vasiteri	Centre	21 May 1989 (aged 27)	0	(France) Agen
Adriu Delai	Wing	11 June 1984 (aged 32)	12	(France) Stade Montois
Benito Masilevu	Wing	7 October 1989 (aged 26)	1	(France) Brive
Waisea Nayacalevu	Wing	26 June 1990 (aged 25)	13	(France) Stade Français
Patrick Osborne	Wing	14 June 1987 (aged 28)	0	(New Zealand) Highlanders
Savenaca Rawaca	Wing	20 August 1991 (aged 24)	0	Fiji Sevens
Samisoni Viriviri	Wing	25 April 1988 (aged 28)	0	(France) Montauban
Kini Murimurivalu	Fullback	15 May 1989 (aged 27)	13	(France) La Rochelle

=== Samoa ===
On 10 May, Head Coach Alama Ieremia announced a 40-man extended squad for the Pacific Nations Cup and their June test against Georgia.

Player	Position	Date of birth (age)	Caps	Club/province
Seilala Lam	Hooker	February 18, 1989 (aged 27)	0	(France) Nevers
Manu Leiataua	Hooker	December 26, 1986 (aged 29)	9	(France) Aurillac
Motu Matu'u	Hooker	April 30, 1987 (aged 29)	31	(New Zealand) Hurricanes
Viliamu Afatia	Prop	May 24, 1990 (aged 26)	14	(France) Agen
Sam Aiono	Prop	April 7, 1989 (aged 27)	1	(New Zealand) Bobbay
Jake Grey	Prop	February 17, 1984 (aged 32)	4	(Samoa) SCOPA
Census Johnston	Prop	May 6, 1981 (aged 35)	52	(France) Toulouse
James Johnston	Prop	March 6, 1986 (aged 30)	14	(England) Worcester Warriors
Nu'uuli Lene	Prop	February 4, 1980 (aged 36)	0	(Samoa) Oriental Rongotai
Sakaria Taulafo	Prop	January 29, 1983 (aged 33)	40	(France) Stade Français
Talaga Alofipo	Lock	November 21, 1992 (aged 23)	0	(Samoa) Vaimoso
Piula Fa'asalele	Lock	January 22, 1988 (aged 28)	5	(France) Castres Olympique
Fa'atiga Lemalu	Lock	April 17, 1989 (aged 27)	15	(Japan) Sunwolves
Filo Paulo	Lock	November 6, 1987 (aged 28)	22	(Italy) Benetton Treviso
Oneone Fa'afou	Flanker	June 2, 1992 (aged 24)	2	(Samoa) Vaiala
Alafoti Fa'osiliva	Flanker	October 28, 1985 (aged 30)	15	(England) Bath
Greg Foe	Flanker	December 17, 1991 (aged 24)	0	(New Zealand) Poneke
Jack Lam	Flanker	November 18, 1987 (aged 28)	19	(England) Bristol
Jeff Lepa	Flanker	October 9, 1991 (aged 24)	0	(New Zealand) Waimea Old Boys
Faifili Levave	Flanker	January 15, 1986 (aged 30)	10	(Japan) Mitsubishi Sagamihara DynaBoars
Elia Elia	Number 8	January 22, 1996 (aged 20)	0	(New Zealand) St Thomas College
TJ Ioane	Number 8	May 9, 1989 (aged 27)	8	(England) Sale Sharks
Pele Cowley	Scrum-half	April 16, 1993 (aged 23)	4	(New Zealand) Pukekohe
Auvasa Faleali'i	Scrum-half	February 9, 1990 (aged 26)	0	(France) Nevers
Dwayne Polataivao	Scrum-half	July 30, 1990 (aged 25)	0	(New Zealand) Pakuranga United
Patrick Fa'apale	Fly-half	May 3, 1991 (aged 25)	7	(Italy) Fiamme Oro
Tusi Pisi	Fly-half	June 18, 1982 (aged 33)	25	(Japan) Sunwolves
Michael Stanley	Fly-half	December 29, 1989 (aged 26)	8	(England) Old Elthamians
Faialaga Afamasaga	Centre	March 5, 1989 (aged 27)	3	(Samoa) Apia
Rey Lee-Lo	Centre	February 20, 1986 (aged 30)	6	(Wales) Cardiff Blues
Paul Perez	Centre	July 26, 1986 (aged 29)	15	(France) Toulouse
Winston Stanley	Centre	February 11, 1989 (aged 27)	2	(England) Harlequins
Alofa Alofa	Wing	March 12, 1991 (aged 25)	3	(France) La Rochelle
Fa'atoina Autagavaia	Wing	September 18, 1988 (aged 27)	18	(France) Nevers
Malu Falaniko	Wing	July 18, 1995 (aged 20)	0	(Samoa) Vaiala
David Lemi (c)	Wing	February 10, 1982 (aged 34)	42	(England) Bristol
Isaia Petelo	Wing		0	(New Zealand) Marist St Pats
Danny Tusitala	Wing	October 18, 1991 (aged 24)	0	(New Zealand) Ponsonby
D'Angelo Leuila	Fullback	January 18, 1997 (aged 19)	0	(New Zealand) Papatoetoe
Tim Nanai-Williams	Fullback	June 12, 1989 (aged 26)	5	(Japan) Ricoh Black Rams
Albert Nikoro	Fullback	August 7, 1992 (aged 23)	0	(Japan) Western Force

=== Tonga ===
On 3 June, head coach Toutai Kefu announced a 28-man squad ahead of Tonga's June test against Georgia and the Pacific Nations Cup.

Note: Flags indicate national union for the club/province as defined by World Rugby.

Player	Position	Date of birth (age)	Caps	Club/province
Sione Angaʻaelangi	Hooker	7 November 1998 (aged 17)	0	(New Zealand) Karaka
Elvis Taione	Hooker	25 May 1983 (aged 33)	21	(England) Exeter Chiefs
Eddie Aholelei	Prop	3 December 1981 (aged 34)	6	(England) London Welsh
Sione Faletau	Prop	20 June 1988 (aged 27)	0	(New Zealand) Sydenham
Fusi Malimali	Prop	1 October 1990 (aged 25)	0	Unattached
Sila Puafisi	Prop	15 April 1988 (aged 28)	23	(Scotland) Glasgow Warriors
Kama Sakalia	Prop	23 August 1985 (aged 30)	6	(Tonga) Marist 'Apifo'ou
Ben Tameifuna	Prop	30 August 1991 (aged 24)	0	(France) Racing 92
Daniel Faleafa	Lock	13 February 1989 (aged 27)	4	(France) Albi
Uili Koloʻofai	Lock	29 September 1982 (aged 33)	5	(England) Jersey Reds
Opeti Fonua	Flanker	26 May 1986 (aged 30)	8	(England) Leicester Tigers
Sione Kalamafoni	Flanker	18 May 1988 (aged 28)	29	(England) Gloucester
Nili Latu (c)	Flanker	19 February 1982 (aged 34)	43	(England) Newcastle Falcons
Jack Ram	Flanker	14 January 1987 (aged 29)	5	(New Zealand) Blues
Sione Tau	Flanker	21 February 1989 (aged 27)	0	(France) Agen
Viliami Fihaki	Number 8	17 January 1987 (aged 29)	8	(England) Sale Sharks
Mikaele Mafi	Number 8	29 May 1987 (aged 29)	0	(New Zealand) Southern
Wayne Ngaluafe	Scrum-half	13 October 1988 (aged 27)	0	(Australia) West Harbour
Sonatane Takulua	Scrum-half	11 January 1991 (aged 25)	14	(England) Newcastle Falcons
Latiume Fosita	Fly-half	25 July 1992 (aged 23)	15	(New Zealand) Papatoetoe
Martin Naufahu	Fly-half	8 July 1990 (aged 25)	0	(Australia) Footscray
Otulea Katoa	Centre	26 April 1991 (aged 25)	7	(Scotland) Edinburgh
Apakuki Ma'afu	Centre	3 October 1987 (aged 28)	0	(Australia) Randwick
Nafi Tuitavake	Centre	29 January 1989 (aged 27)	0	(France) Narbonne
David Halaifonua	Wing	5 July 1987 (aged 28)	15	(England) Gloucester
Viliame Iongi	Wing	8 August 1989 (aged 26)	18	(United States) San Francisco Rush
Daniel Kilioni	Wing	22 February 1993 (aged 23)	0	(France) Grenoble
Viliami Hakalo	Fullback	12 April 1987 (aged 29)	6	(England) Nottingham
Kali Hala	Fullback	6 March 1991 (aged 25)	0	(New Zealand) Karaka
