= Adriu Delai =

Fijian rugby union player

- Born: June 11, 1984 (age 42)
- Height: 1.86 m (6 ft 1 in)
- Weight: 90 kg (198 lb)

Rugby union career
- Position(s): Wing, Centre
Senior career
Years	Team	Apps	(Points)
2016–	Biarritz	29	(40)
2014–2016	Stade Montois	43	(10)
2013–2014	Tarbes	27	(25)
2013	Massy	9	(10)
2012	Rodez	4	(5)
International career
Years	Team	Apps	(Points)
2011–2016	Fiji	14	(10)

Adriu Delai (born June 11, 1984) is a Fijian rugby union player. He is a Fijian international and has played for several French clubs in the Pro D2 and Fédérale 1. In 2016 he played against Georgia in a test match for their 2016 mid-year tour. He was selected to play in the 2016 Pacific Nations Cup.

== Honours & achievements ==
Biarritz

- Rugby Pro D2 top try scorer: 2017–18 (15 tries)
