= Nemia Soqeta =

Fijian rugby union player (born 1985)

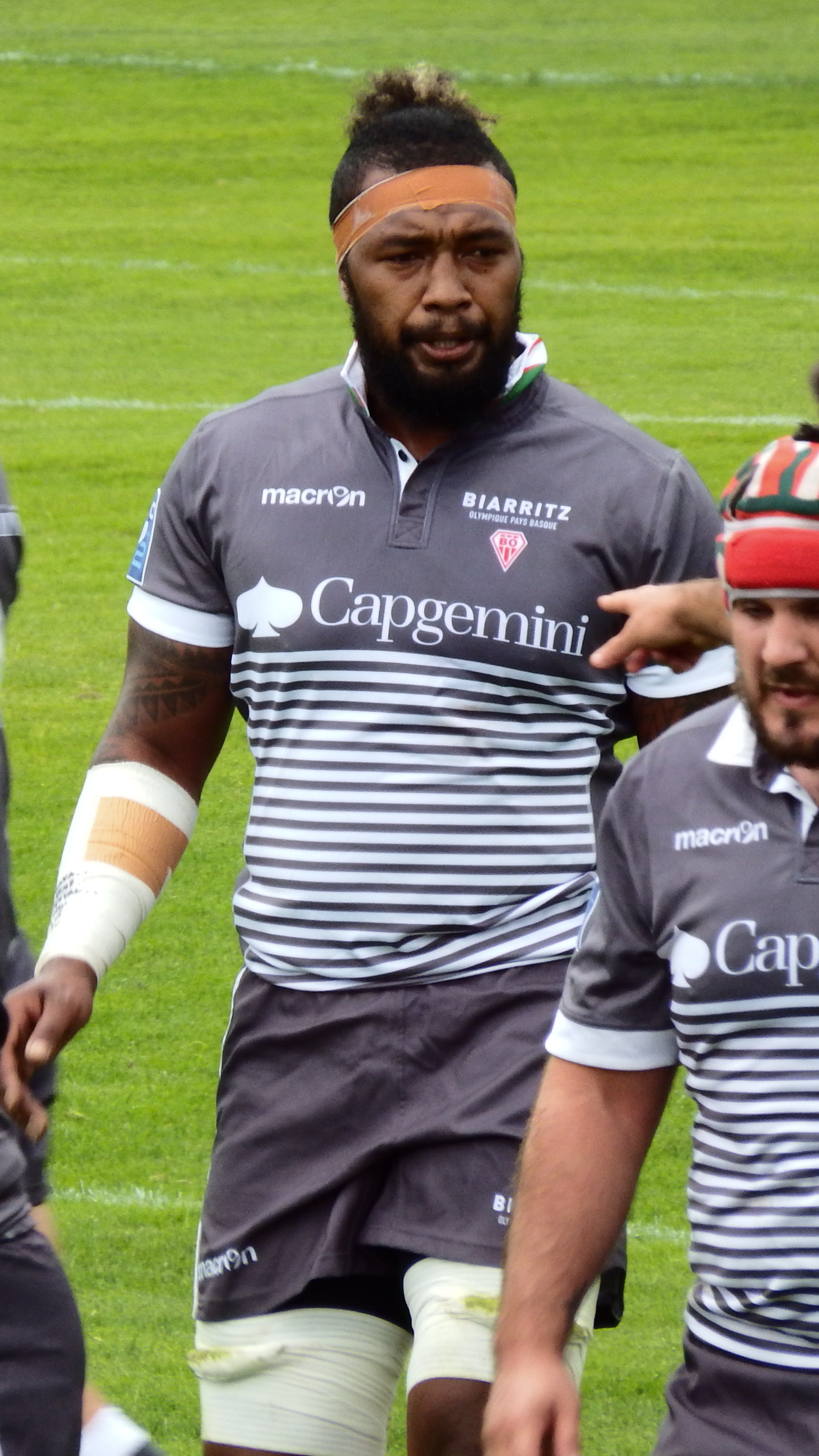
- Soqeta during a match against US Dax, October 2016
- Full name: Nemia Rata Soqeta
- Born: 4 March 1985 (age 41) Nadi, Fiji
- Height: 196 cm (6 ft 5 in)
- Weight: 117 kg (258 lb; 18 st 6 lb)
- School: Wesley College

Rugby union career
- Position(s): Lock, Number 8
- Current team: US Dax
Senior career
Years	Team	Apps	(Points)
2008–2013	Taranaki	30	(5)
2010–2011	Toyota Industries Shuttles	4	(0)
2013–2014	Oyonnax	11	(5)
2014–2018	Biarritz	79	(30)
2018–	US Dax	36	(10)
- Correct as of 12 May 2020
International career
Years	Team	Apps	(Points)
2014–2016	Fiji	14	(5)
- Correct as of 12 May 2020

Nemia Soqeta (born 4 March 1985) is a Fijian rugby union player. He was named in Fiji's squad for the 2015 Rugby World Cup.

He played for the French club Oyonnax in the Top 14. In 2016, Soqeta was named in the squad for the World Rugby Pacific Nations Cup. He played in the test match against Georgia, when Georgia toured the Pacific nations in their 2016 mid-year tour.
