= Greg Foe =

Samoan international rugby union player

- Full name: Gregory Foe
- Born: 17 December 1991 (age 34) Samoa
- Height: 1.81 m (5 ft 11 in)
- Weight: 102 kg (16 st 1 lb; 225 lb)
- School: Papatoetoe High School

Rugby union career
- Position: Flanker
- Current team: Wellington
Senior career
Years	Team	Apps	(Points)
2014–	Wellington	21	(10)
- Correct as of 19 November 2016
International career
Years	Team	Apps	(Points)
2011	Samoa U20	3	(0)
2013–	Samoa sevens	7	(45)
2016	Samoa A	4	(10)
2016–	Samoa	5	(0)
- Correct as of 26 November 2016

Greg Foe (born 17 December 1991) is a Samoan international rugby union player who currently plays as a flanker for Wellington in New Zealand's domestic Mitre 10 Cup.

== Senior career ==
Foe debuted for the Wellington Lions during the 2014 ITM Cup, however that was to be his sole appearance during the competition that year. 2015 was to prove to be a more successful campaign for him on a personal level, making 10 appearances, 5 of which were from the start and then by 2016, he had established himself as a regular in the Wellington side which reached the Championship semi-finals before going down to North Harbour.

== International ==
Born in Samoa, but raised in New Zealand, Foe has represented the land of his birth at numerous levels including; under 20, sevens and Samoa A.

He first made the Samoa senior national team in 2016, debuting in the number 7 jersey in a 26–16 defeat against Fiji in Suva. He went on to earn a second cap a week later in a victory over Tonga and later in the year was named in the Samoa squad for the 2016 end-of-year rugby union internationals.
