= Daniel Kilioni =

Tonga international rugby union player

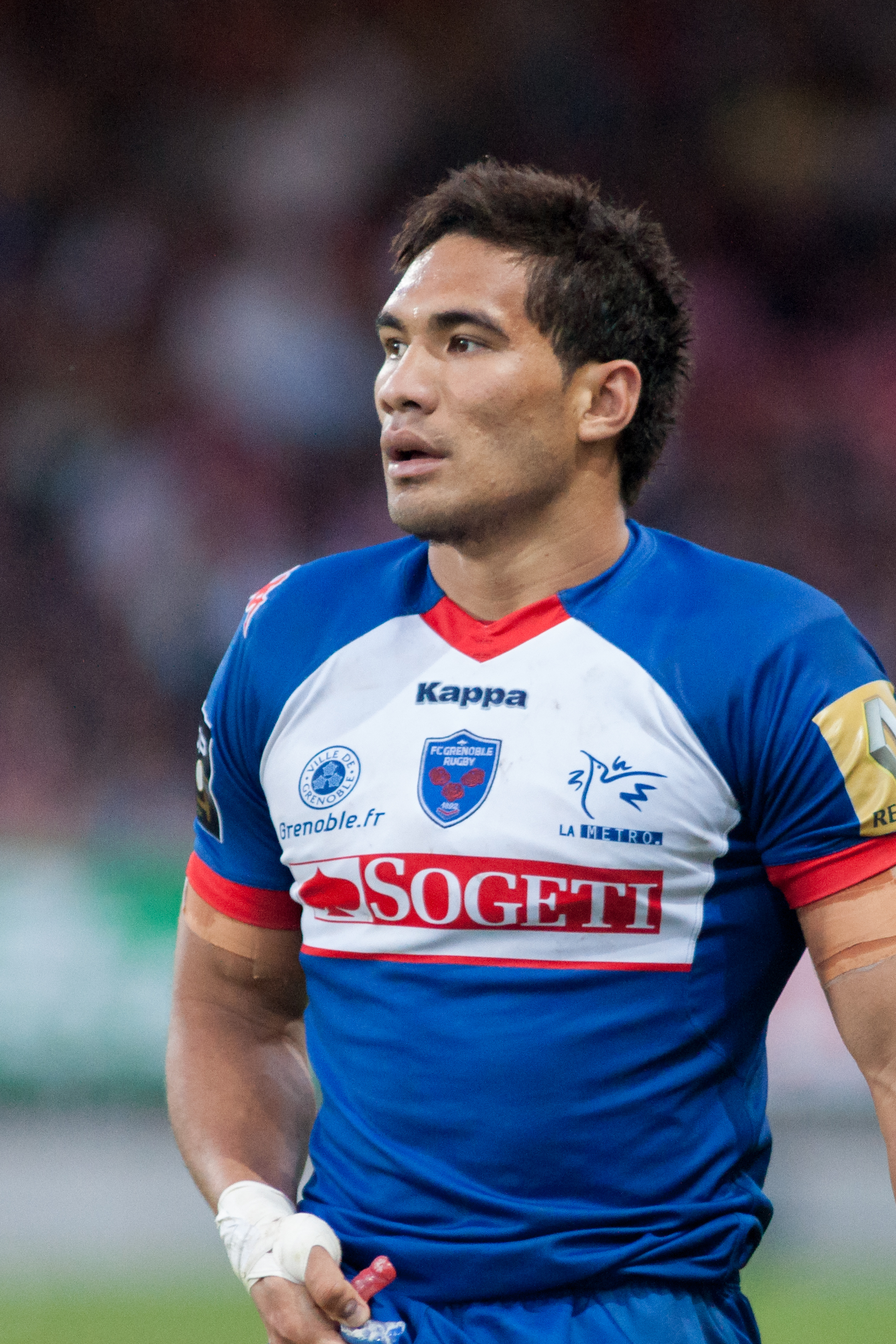
- Born: 22 February 1993 (age 33) Havelu, Tonga
- Height: 6 ft 1 in (185 cm)
- Weight: 213 lb (97 kg)

Rugby union career
- Position: Wing
Senior career
Years	Team	Apps	(Points)
2013–16	FC Grenoble	32	(30)
2016–17	US Carcassonne	5	(5)
2017–20	FC Grenoble	22	(15)
2021–	CM Floirac		
International career
Years	Team	Apps	(Points)
2016–18	Tonga	4	(0)

Daniel Kilioni (born 22 February 1993) is a Tongan professional rugby union player.

== Rugby career ==
Born in Havelu, Tonga, Kilioni is a winger, based in France since 2013. He started as a junior at FC Grenoble and signed a professional contract with the Top 14 club in 2016. Except for one season on loan with US Carcassonne, Kilioni remained in Grenoble until 2020, after which he joined CM Floirac.

=== International ===
Kilioni made his debut for Tonga against Fiji in Suva during the 2016 Pacific Nations Cup and was capped as a substitute a week later against Georgia. He gained a further two caps in 2018, including a match against Wales at Cardiff's Millennium Stadium. In 2019, Kilioni was flown to Japan for Tonga's final two World Cup pool matches, replacing injured winger Nafi Tuitavake, who had suffered a broken arm.

== See also ==
- List of Tonga national rugby union players
