= Jeff Lepa =

Samoa international rugby union player

- Born: 10 September 1991 (age 35) Apia, Samoa
- Height: 1.95 m (6 ft 5 in)
- Weight: 112 kg (17 st 9 lb; 247 lb)
- School: Linwood College; Christchurch Boys' High School

Rugby union career
- Position: Lock / Loose forward
- Current team: Tasman
Senior career
Years	Team	Apps	(Points)
2014–	Tasman	5	(0)
- Correct as of 12 November 2016
International career
Years	Team	Apps	(Points)
2016–	Samoa	6	(5)
- Correct as of 26 November 2016

Jeff Lepa (born 10 September 1991) is a Samoan international rugby union player who currently plays as a lock or loose forward for Tasman in New Zealand's domestic Mitre 10 Cup.

== Early career ==
Born in Apia, capital city of Samoa, Lepa emigrated to New Zealand as a child. He made the Linwood College first XV at the age of 14 and later transferred to the prestigious Christchurch Boys' High School with whom he played in 2009. Upon leaving school, he joined the Waimea Old Boys' Club in the Tasman club league.

== Senior career ==
Lepa's club form saw him first named in the Tasman Makos provincial squad in 2014, however he didn't get any game time. He debuted for the Makos the following season, making 3 substitute appearances. His first start came in 2016 and he made 2 appearances during the season as Tasman reached the Premiership final before going down to Canterbury

== International ==
Based largely on excellent club form for the Waimea Old Boys, Lepa was called up by the land of his birth, Samoa, ahead of the 2016 mid-year rugby union internationals. He debuted in the number eight jersey in Samoa's 19–19 draw with Georgia in Apia on 11 June 2016. He then featured as a lock in the other two June test matches against Pacific rivals Fiji and Tonga with his first international try coming in the victory over Tonga on 25 June.

Samoa head-coach Alama Ieremia also named Lepa in his squad for the 2016 end-of-year rugby union internationals against France, Georgia and Canada.
