= Harry Higgins (rugby) =

US international rugby union & league player

- Born: 8 October 1991 (age 35)
- Height: 6 ft 3 in (1.91 m)
- Weight: 230 lb (100 kg; 16 st 6 lb)

Rugby union career
- Position: Flanker
Senior career
Years	Team	Apps	(Points)
2016–2019	Old Blue R.F.C.		
2020–	Rugby ATL		
International career
Years	Team	Apps	(Points)
2016	United States	1	
- Rugby league career

Playing information
Club
Years	Team	Pld	T	G	FG	P
2021	Atlanta Rhinos

Harrison Gordon "Harry" Higgins (born 8 October 1991) is an Australian-born rugby union and rugby league player who played for the United States national rugby union team. He played for Rugby ATL of Major League Rugby (MLR) and Atlanta Rhinos of North American Rugby League (NARL). He also for played for Wests Bulldogs.

A versatile player, Higgins can play No. 8 and Lock, but primarily plays flanker.

Higgins attended Brisbane Grammar School from 2004 to 2008 and played in the First XV.

Higgins debuted for the U.S. on 18 June 2016 against Italy.

He also played for Old Blue Rugby Football Club in New York.

He also played Rugby League in 2021 for the Atlanta Rhinos of North American Rugby League.

Higgins also played for Wests Bulldogs, winning a premiership with the club in 2022.
