= Opeti Fonua =

Tongan rugby union player

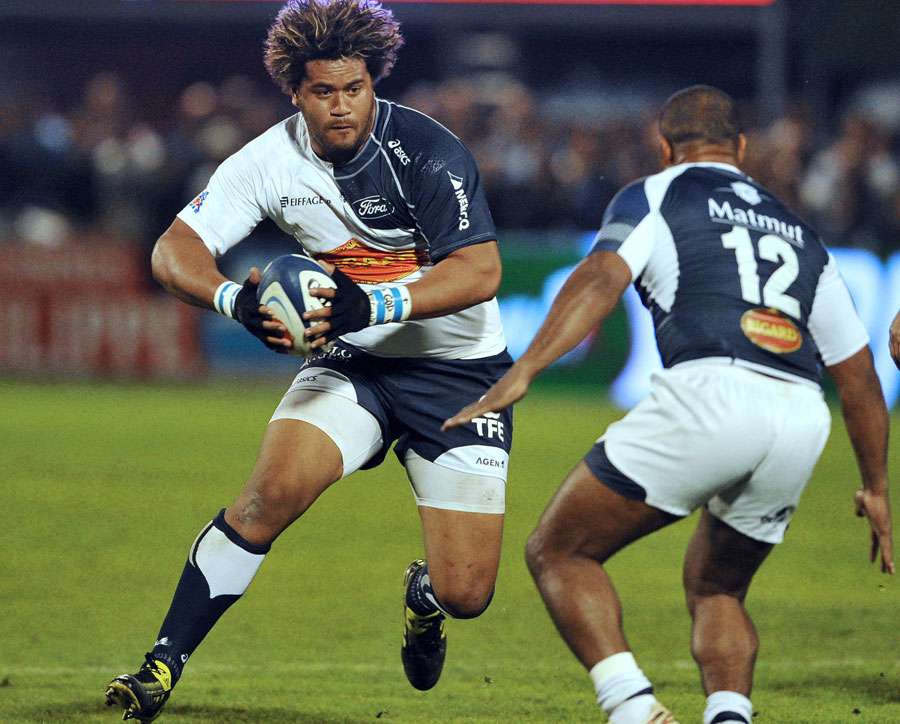
- Born: Opeti Fonua; 26 May 1986 (age 40) Tonga
- Height: 1.98 m (6 ft 6 in)
- Weight: 135 kg (298 lb; 21 st 4 lb)

Rugby union career
- Position(s): Number 8, Lock
Senior career
Years	Team	Apps	(Points)
2005-07	SU Agen	35	(50)
2007-08	FC Auch	12	(0)
2008-13	SU Agen	111	(155)
2013-15	Bayonne	31	(20)
2015	London Welsh	16	(30)
2015-2016	Leicester Tigers	7	(5)
2016-2017	Newcastle Falcons	12	(0)
2017-	SU Agen	0	(0)
- Correct as of February 2016
International career
Years	Team	Apps	(Points)
2009-	Tonga	11	(10)

Opeti Fonua (born 26 May 1986) is a Tongan rugby union player who plays number 8 for SU Agen, having transferred from Newcastle Falcons. Fonua is known for his immense size and strength, but also for his surprisingly high levels of speed and agility for his size (his official weight according to his Su Agen profile is 150 kg), although in the past he has been listed as lighter. A highly physical player, both with and without the ball, Fonua is known for big tackles and strong carries.

On 10 February 2015, it was announced Fonua had signed for Leicester Tigers Fonua was named in Tonga's 2015 Rugby World Cup squad.
