= Fa'atoina Autagavaia =

Samoa international rugby union player

- Born: Fa'atoina Autagavaia; 18 September 1988 (age 38) Vailoa i Palauli, Samoa
- Height: 1.87 m (6 ft 1 1/2 in)
- Weight: 92 kg (203 lb)

Rugby union career
- Position: Fullback
Senior career
Years	Team	Apps	(Points)
2012-2013	Northland Rugby Union	8	(10)
2013–14	Northampton Saints	10	(5)
2014–	USO Nevers	52	(115)
- Correct as of 2 November 2018
International career
Years	Team	Apps	(Points)
2012–	Samoa	21	(15)
- Correct as of 25 June 2016

Fa'atoina Autagavaia (born 18 September 1988) is a Samoan rugby union player. He plays in the fullback (and occasionally wing) position for USO Nevers and for the Samoan national team.
