= Save Tabakanalagi =

- Full name: Savenaca Tabakanalagi
- Born: 31 August 1986 (age 40)

Rugby union career
- Position: Lock
International career
Years	Team	Apps	(Points)
2016	Fiji	2	(0)

Savenaca Tabakanalagi (born 31 August 1986) is a Fijian rugby union player and former international.

Based in France since 2015, Tabakanalagi is a lock and plays with RC Sablais. Previously, he played at Rugby Club Strasbourg and CS Beaune. He has also competed in New Zealand rugby for the Paeroa West club.

Tabakanalagi, a Suva product, was capped twice by Fiji in 2016, for home Tests against Tonga and Georgia.

== See also ==
- List of Fiji national rugby union players
