= Patrick Fa'apale =

- Born: May 3, 1991 (age 35)
- Height: 1.79 m (5 ft 10 in)
- Weight: 90 kg (14 st 2 lb; 198 lb)

Rugby union career
- Position: Fly half
Senior career
Years	Team	Apps	(Points)
2015−2016	Fiamme Oro	7	(21)
2019−	Manuma Samoa		
International career
Years	Team	Apps	(Points)
2014–present	Samoa	14	(65)

Patrick Fa'apale (born 3 May 1991) is a rugby union fly-half who plays for Vaiala and Samoa. Fa’apale made his debut for Samoa in 2014 and was part of the squad at the 2015 Rugby World Cup.
