= Taniela Koroi =

Fijian rugby union player (born 1990)

- Born: 8 February 1990 (age 36) Kadavu, Fiji
- Height: 1.84 m (6 ft 1/2 in)
- Weight: 125 kg (276 lb)
- School: Tawa College

Rugby union career
- Position: Prop/Hooker
- Current team: ASMacon Rugby
Senior career
| Years | Team | Apps | (Points) |
| 2014-16 2015-18 2021- | Mogliano Rugby London Scottish ASMacon Rugby | | |
Provincial / State sides
| Years | Team | Apps | (Points) |
| | Wellington | 11 | (5) |
| 2018–2019 | Auckland | 5 | (0) |
- Correct as of 19 November 2018
International career
| Years | Team | Apps | (Points) |
| 2014– | Fiji | 6 | (0) |
- Correct as of 24 June 2016

Taniela Koroi (born 8 February 1990) is a Fijian rugby union player. He was in Fiji's squad for the 2015 Rugby World Cup. He plays in the prop position.
