= Danny Tusitala =

Samoan rugby union player

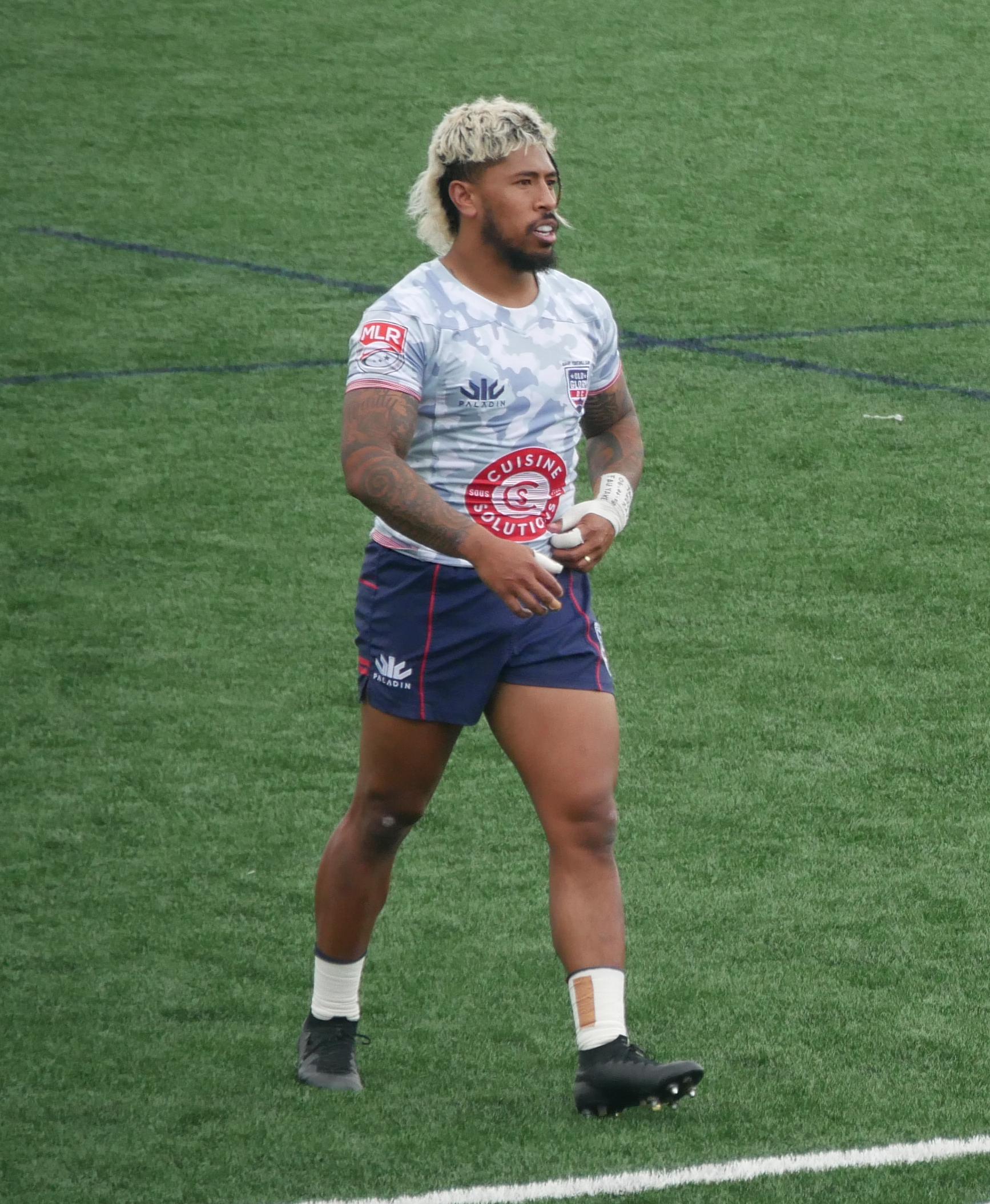
- Danny Tusitala playing for Old Glory DC
- Full name: Danny Joseph Kirifi Tusitala
- Born: 18 October 1991 (age 35) Auckland, New Zealand
- Height: 172 cm (5 ft 8 in)
- Weight: 83 kg (183 lb; 13 st 1 lb)
- School: Kelston Boys' High School

Rugby union career
- Position: Half-back
- Current team: Old Glory DC
Senior career
Years	Team	Apps	(Points)
2017–2018	Aurillac	9	(5)
2019–2020	Auckland	17	(10)
2020–	Old Glory DC	58	(76)
2021	Hawke's Bay	5	(0)
- Correct as of 12 April 2024
International career
Years	Team	Apps	(Points)
2016–2018	Samoa A	13	(25)
2016, 2024	Samoa	5	(5)
- Correct as of 4 September 2024
National sevens team
Years	Team		Comps
2015–2019	Samoa		13

Danny Tusitala (born 18 October 1991 in New Zealand) is a Samoan rugby union player, who plays as a scrum-half for Old Glory DC in Major League Rugby (MLR).

In October 2021, he joined Hawke's Bay in the National Provincial Championship competition as an injury replacement for the remainder of their 2021 Bunnings NPC season.

Tusitala previously played for Auckland in the Mitre 10 Cup and Aurillac in the Pro D2. He has played for Samoa internationally in both the XV and sevens forms of the game.
