= Eroni Vasiteri =

- Full name: Eroni Vasiteri Narumasa
- Born: 27 May 1989 (age 37) Fiji
- Height: 1.83 m (6 ft 0 in)
- Weight: 110 kg (17 st 5 lb; 243 lb)

Rugby union career
- Position: Centre
- Current team: Fijian Drua
Amateur team(s)
Years	Team	Apps	(Points)
2013	Navosa		
2014–2016	Nadroga		
Senior career
Years	Team	Apps	(Points)
2015–2016	Agen	11	(0)
2017–present	Fijian Drua	5	(5)
- Correct as of 11 October 2017
International career
Years	Team	Apps	(Points)
2015–present	Fiji Warriors	8	(10)
2016–present	Fiji	6	(5)
- Correct as of 23 November 2018

Eroni Vasiteri (born 27 May 1989) is a Fijian rugby union player. His usual position is as a centre, and he currently plays for Fijian Drua, having previously represented Connacht.
