= Viliami Hakalo =

Tongan rugby union player (born 1987)

- Born: 4 December 1987 (age 38) Tonga
- Height: 1.85 m (6 ft 1 in)
- Weight: 104 kg (16 st 5 lb; 229 lb)

Rugby union career
- Position: Centre
Senior career
Years	Team	Apps	(Points)
2006–2007	Provence	6	(10)
2007–2008	Blagnac	14	(0)
2014–2015	Bedford Blues	13	(10)
2015–2018	Nottingham	60	(62)
2018–2020	Saracens	10	(10)
- Correct as of 25 September 2018
International career
Years	Team	Apps	(Points)
2006–2018	Tonga	10	(22)
- Correct as of 25 September 2018

Viliami Hakalo (born 4 December 1987) is a Tongan rugby union player. His usual position is as a Centre.
