= Failaga Afamasaga =

Samoa international rugby union player

Faialaga Afamasaga
- Born: 5 March 1989 (age 37) Fasito'o Tai, Western Samoa
- Height: 1.78 m (5 ft 10 in)
- Weight: 106 kg (234 lb; 16 st 10 lb)
- School: Avele College

Rugby union career
- Position: Centre
- Current team: Colorno
Senior career
Years	Team	Apps	(Points)
2015	Northland		
2016−2018	Zebre	12	(5)
2018−2021	Colorno	11	(15)
- Correct as of 11 October 2017
International career
Years	Team	Apps	(Points)
2007	Samoa Under 20	5	(13)
2015–16	Samoa A	8	(7)
2015–16	Samoa	6	(0)
- Correct as of 11 October 2017

Faialaga Afamasaga (born 5 March 1989) is a Samoan rugby union player. His usual position is as a Centre, and he currently plays for Colorno in Top12.

From 2016 to 2018 he played for Zebre.

After playing for Samoa Under 19 squad in 2007, from 2015 to 2016 he was named in the Samoa and Samoa A squads.
