= Wayne Ngaluafe =

Tonga international rugby union player

- Full name: Terence Jethro Wayne Ngaluafe
- Born: 13 October 1988 (age 38) Auckland, New Zealand
- Height: 6 ft 0 in (183 cm)
- Weight: 176 lb (80 kg)

Rugby union career
- Position: Halfback
Provincial / State sides
Years	Team	Apps	(Points)
2011	Northland	9	(0)
2013–14	Auckland	11	(0)
Super Rugby
Years	Team	Apps	(Points)
2013	Blues	2	(0)
International career
Years	Team	Apps	(Points)
2016	Tonga	1	(0)

Terence Jethro Wayne Ngaluafe (born 13 October 1988) is a New Zealand-born Tongan former rugby union player.

Born in Auckland, Ngaluafe was a New Zealand under-19s representative halfback and played in the side that won the 2007 Under 19 Rugby World Championship, before switching his allegiance.

Ngaluafe, an Auckland and Northland provincial player, made two appearances for the Blues, both off the bench. He debuted in their match against France in 2013, as a second-half replacement for Jamison Gibson-Park, then a month later got flown over to Bloemfontein when Piri Weepu pulled out of a match against the Cheetahs.

In 2016, Ngaluafe gained a cap for Tonga against Georgia in Suva.

Ngaluafe played rugby for West Harbour in the Shute Shield.

== See also ==
- List of Tonga national rugby union players
