= James Leckie =

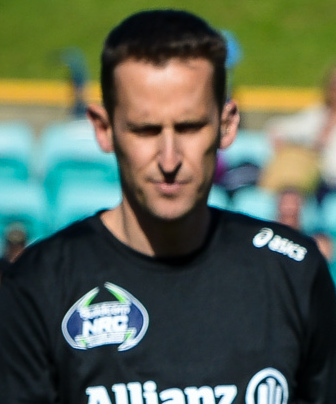
- Born: 27 November 1975 (age 50)

Rugby union career
Refereeing career
Years	Competition	Apps
2006	Test Matches	
2005	U-19 World Championship	
–	Commonwealth Games	
–	Hong Kong 7's	
–	Super Rugby	

James Thomas Leckie (born 27 November 1975) is a rugby union referee from Sydney, Australia. Originally a teacher and sportsmaster at Trinity Grammar School (Summer Hill), Leckie took up refereeing in 1994 and became a full-time referee in 2007. He was appointed to his first test match in 2006, which was a 2007 Rugby World Cup qualifying match between Hong Kong and Korea. He was appointed to the 2005 IRB Under-19 World Championship final and was introduced on to the 2006 IRB panel of touch judges and TMOs for test matches. James has continued to be include on the IRB panel of assistant referees in subsequent years. He has also refereed the rugby union final at the Commonwealth Games and a final at the Hong Kong Sevens. Leckie is also a regular referee in Super Rugby and in 2009, was named as one of 9 referees from the SANZAR countries, on the merit based panel, who are to take charge of at least 75% of all games. This is so the best 9 referees from Australia, New Zealand and South Africa, take charge of the Southern Hemispheres best players and teams.

James Leckie is now a teacher in Sydney, Australia.
