= Uili Koloʻofai =

Tonga international rugby union player

- Born: 29 September 1982 (age 44)
- Height: 6 ft 6 in (1.98 m)
- Weight: 260 lb (118 kg)
- School: King's High School, Dunedin

Rugby union career
- Position: Lock/Flanker
Senior career
Years	Team	Apps	(Points)
2010–2011	Crociati Parma Rugby FC	20	(20)
2011–2012	Rugby Club Cavalieri I Prato	17	(25)
2012–2014	US Colomiers	44	(5)
2014–2015	Newcastle Falcons	3	(5)
2015–2018	Jersey Reds	69	(80)
Provincial / State sides
Years	Team	Apps	(Points)
2004-2009	Otago	10	(15)
International career
Years	Team	Apps	(Points)
2013-	Tonga	8	(0)

Uili Kolo'ofai (born 29 September 1982, in Auckland, New Zealand) is a rugby union player from Tonga. He plays for the Tongan national side and previously for Newcastle Falcons as lock. Kolo'ofai was named in Tonga's 2015 Rugby World Cup squad.

Kolo'ofai signed with Newcastle Falcons in 2014 on a two-year contract. After only a year he left the club due to injury woes that saw him make only a few appearances for the Falcons. He played in Japan before he moved to Europe and played in Italy for Parma and Cavalieri Prato. Then he moved to France and played for Colomiers before joining the Newcastle Falcons. After granted early release from Newcastle, Kolofai signed for Jersey Reds from the 2015-16 RFU Championship season.
