= Sione Faletau =

- Born: 20 June 1988 (age 38) Tonga
- Height: 1.83 m (6 ft 0 in)
- Weight: 127 kg (20 st 0 lb; 280 lb)

Rugby union career
- Position: Prop
- Current team: Bristol Bears
Senior career
Years	Team	Apps	(Points)
2013–2015	Canterbury	10	(5)
2016	Counties Manukau	8	(5)
2016–2017	Yorkshire Carnegie	12	(10)
2017–	Bristol Bears	9	(0)
- Correct as of 8 September 2018
International career
Years	Team	Apps	(Points)
2015	Tonga	1	(0)
- Correct as of 8 September 2018

Sione Faletau (born 20 June 1988) is a Tonga rugby union player. His usual position is as a Prop, and he currently plays for Bristol Bears.

Faletau has previously played for Tonga and Yorkshire Carnegie. In March 2017 he was signed to Bristol.
