= 2012 June rugby union tests =

The 2012 mid-year rugby union tests (also known as the Summer Internationals in the Northern Hemisphere) refer to the rugby union Internationals that were played through June, mostly in the Southern Hemisphere.

These matches marked the start of a global rugby calendar established by the International Rugby Board (IRB), which runs until 2019. The calendar includes a return of traditional tours by European teams, in which a team plays multiple Tests against a southern hemisphere side, often with mid-week matches against provincial or regional sides. This year, all three of the teams that competed in the Rugby Championship's predecessor tournament, the Tri Nations, hosted European nations in three-Test series. Australia hosted Wales, marking the first three-Test series in Australia by a top European side since the British & Irish Lions' 2001 tour. South Africa hosted England for three Tests, the first extended tour of that country by a single nation since New Zealand toured in 1996.

The new calendar also provided expanded Test opportunities for so-called "Tier 2" nations. As part of this IRB initiative, another tradition returned – tours of the Pacific Islands by major nations. Scotland became the first Tier 1 nation to play a Test in the Pacific Islands since 2006, visiting Fiji and Samoa. Also, Italy toured the Americas, claiming wins over Canada and the United States and a loss to Argentina.

== Overview ==
=== Series ===
Tour	Result	Winners
Australia v Wales test series (3 tests)	3–0	Australia
New Zealand v Ireland test series (3 tests)	3–0	New Zealand
Argentina v France test series (2 tests)	1–1	Drawn
South Africa v England test series (3 tests)	2–0	South Africa
Japan v French Barbarians test series (2 tests)	0–2	French Barbarians

=== Other tours ===
Team/Tour	Opponents
Barbarians end of season tour	England (lost) – Ireland (won) – Wales (lost)
Italy tour	Argentina (lost) – Canada (won) – United States (won)
Scotland tour	Australia (won) – Fiji (won) – Samoa (won)
Georgia tour	United States (lost) – Canada (lost)

== Fixtures ==
=== Week 1 ===
27 May 2012
14:30 BST (UTC+01)

England	57–26	Barbarians
Try: Ashton (3) 17' c, 37' c, 43' c Hartley 34' m Wade 57' c Wigglesworth 66' c Joseph (2) 69' c, 79' c Con: Farrell (7/8) 17', 38', 44', 57', 67', 70', 80'; Pen: Farrell (1/2) 2'	Report	Try: Muliaina (2) 31' m, 47' c Tindall 63' c Taele 71' c Con: Donald (2/3) 32', 64'; Contepomi (1/1) 72'

Twickenham Stadium, London
Attendance: 42,269
Referee: John Lacey (Ireland)

FB	15	Ben Foden	(substituted off) 50'
RW	14	Chris Ashton
OC	13	Brad Barritt
IC	12	Owen Farrell
LW	11	Christian Wade
FH	10	Charlie Hodgson
SH	9	Lee Dickson	(substituted off) 60'
N8	8	Phil Dowson (c)	(substituted off) 67'
OF	7	Carl Fearns	(substituted off) 55'
BF	6	Tom Johnson	(substituted off) 50'
RL	5	Tom Palmer
LL	4	Mouritz Botha	(substituted off) 55'
TP	3	Paul Doran-Jones
HK	2	Dylan Hartley
LP	1	Matt Stevens	(substituted off) 40'
Replacements:
HK	16	Lee Mears	(substituted on) 67'
PR	17	Matt Mullan	(substituted on) 40'
LK	18	Joe Launchbury	(substituted on) 55'
FL	19	Jamie Gibson	(substituted on) 55'
SH	20	Richard Wigglesworth	(substituted on) 60'
CE	21	Jonathan Joseph	(substituted on) 50'
FB	22	Alex Goode	(substituted on) 50'
Coach:
(England) Stuart Lancaster

FB	15	(New Zealand) Mils Muliaina
RW	14	(England) Paul Sackey	(substituted off) 45'
OC	13	(New Zealand) Casey Laulala
IC	12	(England) Mike Tindall	(substituted off) 67'
LW	11	(England) Iain Balshaw
FH	10	(New Zealand) Stephen Donald
SH	9	(Scotland) Rory Lawson	(substituted off) 56'
N8	8	(Scotland) Johnnie Beattie	(substituted off) 67'
OF	7	(Fiji) Akapusi Qera	(substituted off) 59'
BF	6	(South Africa) Ernst Joubert
RL	5	(South Africa) Anton van Zyl
LL	4	(Australia) Mark Chisholm
TP	3	(New Zealand) John Afoa
HK	2	(South Africa) John Smit (c)	(substituted off) 59'
LP	1	(New Zealand) Neemia Tialata	(substituted off) 59'
Replacements:
HK	16	(France) Benoît August	(substituted on) 59'
PR	17	(Wales) Duncan Jones	(substituted on) 59'
LK	18	(Samoa) Pelu Taele	(substituted on) 67'
N8	19	(France) Raphaël Lakafia	(substituted on) 59'
SH	20	(France) Jérôme Fillol	(substituted on) 56'
FH	21	(Argentina) Felipe Contepomi	(substituted on) 67'
WG	22	(Samoa) Sailosi Tagicakibau	(substituted on) 45'
Coach:
(New Zealand) John Kirwan

Assistant referees:
Peter Fitzgibbon (Ireland)
Simon McDowell (Ireland)

- As per tradition, the Barbarians' side featured uncapped players: Jérôme Fillol, Ernst Joubert and Anton van Zyl.

=== Week 2 ===
29 May 2012
19:45 BST (UTC+01)

Ireland	28–29	Barbarians
Try: Gilroy (2) 15' c, 64' c Earls 25' c Zebo 44' c Con: O'Gara (4/4) 15', 25', 44', 64'	Report	Try: Balshaw 11' c C. van Zyl 18' c Sackey 29' c Tindall 58' m Con: Contepomi (3/4) 11', 18', 29'; Pen: Contepomi (1/1) 78'

Kingsholm Stadium, Gloucester
Attendance: 11,654
Referee: Jérôme Garcès (France)

FB	15	Keith Earls
RW	14	Craig Gilroy
OC	13	Darren Cave
IC	12	Paddy Wallace
LW	11	Simon Zebo
FH	10	Ronan O'Gara (c)
SH	9	Conor Murray
N8	8	Peter O'Mahony	(substituted off) 71'
OF	7	Chris Henry	(substituted off) 60'
BF	6	John Muldoon
RL	5	Donnacha Ryan
LL	4	Dan Tuohy	(substituted off) 60'
TP	3	Declan Fitzpatrick	(substituted off) 58'	(substituted on) 70'
HK	2	Mike Sherry
LP	1	Brett Wilkinson	(substituted off) 70'
Replacements:
HK	16	Rory Best
PR	17	Ronan Loughney	(substituted on) 58'
LK	18	Donncha O'Callaghan	(substituted on) 60'
FL	19	James Coughlan	(substituted on) 60'
SH	20	Paul Marshall
CE	21	Nevin Spence
WG	22	Andrew Trimble	(substituted on) 71'
Coach:
(Ireland) Declan Kidney

FB	15	(France) Cédric Heymans	(substituted off) 68'
RW	14	(England) Paul Sackey
OC	13	(England) Mike Tindall
IC	12	(France) Damien Traille
LW	11	(Samoa) Sailosi Tagicakibau
FH	10	(Argentina) Felipe Contepomi
SH	9	(Scotland) Rory Lawson	(substituted off) 71'
N8	8	(France) Raphaël Lakafia
OF	7	(South Africa) Francois Louw
BF	6	(Georgia (country)) Mamuka Gorgodze	(substituted off) 66'
RL	5	(Italy) Corniel van Zyl
LL	4	(Ireland) Mick O'Driscoll (c)
TP	3	(New Zealand) John Afoa
HK	2	(France) Benoît August	(substituted off) 41'
LP	1	(Wales) Duncan Jones	(substituted off) 56'
Replacements:
HK	16	(New Zealand) Aled de Malmanche	(substituted on) 41'
PR	17	(New Zealand) Neemia Tialata	(substituted on) 56'
LK	18	(Samoa) Pelu Taele
FL	19	(Fiji) Akapusi Qera	(substituted on) 66'
SH	20	(Wales) Richie Rees	(substituted on) 71'
FH	21	(New Zealand) Stephen Donald	(substituted on) 68'
WG	22	(Fiji) Isa Nacewa
Coach:
(New Zealand) John Kirwan

- Contrary to tradition, the Barbarians side did not feature any uncapped players.

2 June 2012
14:00 BST (UTC+01)

Wales	30–21	Barbarians
Try: Robinson 10' c Hook 71' c Brew 79' c Con: Hook (3/3) 11', 72', 80'; Pen: Hook (3/3) 4', 25', 51'	Report	Try: Donald (2) 27' c, 59' c Rees 36' c Con: Donald (3/3) 28', 37', 60'

Millennium Stadium, Cardiff
Attendance: 57,565
Referee: Alain Rolland (Ireland)

FB	15	Liam Williams
RW	14	Harry Robinson		(substituted off) 35'	(substituted on) 44'	(substituted off) 68'
OC	13	Andrew Bishop
IC	12	James Hook
LW	11	Aled Brew
FH	10	Dan Biggar		(substituted off) 64'
SH	9	Lloyd Williams		(substituted off) 51'
N8	8	Ryan Jones		(substituted off) 44'
OF	7	Justin Tipuric
BF	6	Josh Turnbull
RL	5	Ian Evans
LL	4	Alun Wyn Jones		(substituted off) 45'
TP	3	Rhodri Jones		(substituted off) 51'
HK	2	Matthew Rees (c)		(substituted off) 68'
LP	1	Rhys Gill	(yellow card) 34' to 44'
Replacements:
HK	16	Richard Hibbard		(substituted on) 68'
PR	17	Paul James		(substituted on) 35'
LK	18	Aaron Shingler		(substituted on) 51'
FL	19	Martyn Williams		(substituted on) 45'
SH	20	Rhys Webb		(substituted on) 51'
CE	21	Adam Warren		(substituted on) 64'
FB	22	Will Harries		(substituted on) 68'
Coach:
(Wales) Rob Howley

FB	15	(New Zealand) Mils Muliaina	(substituted off) 66'
RW	14	(Fiji) Isa Nacewa
OC	13	(England) Mike Tindall	(substituted off) 46'
IC	12	(New Zealand) Casey Laulala
LW	11	(Wales) Shane Williams
FH	10	(New Zealand) Stephen Donald
SH	9	(Wales) Richie Rees	(substituted off) 56'
N8	8	(Scotland) Johnnie Beattie
OF	7	(Georgia (country)) Mamuka Gorgodze	(substituted off) 56'
BF	6	(South Africa) Francois Louw
RL	5	(Australia) Mark Chisholm
LL	4	(Ireland) Mick O'Driscoll	(substituted off) 40'
TP	3	(South Africa) John Smit (c)	(substituted off) 46'
HK	2	(France) Benoît August	(substituted off) 40'
LP	1	(Wales) Duncan Jones
Replacements:
HK	16	(New Zealand) Aled de Malmanche	(substituted on) 40'
PR	17	(New Zealand) Neemia Tialata	(substituted on) 46'
LK	18	(South Africa) Anton van Zyl	(substituted on) 40'
N8	19	(Fiji) Akapusi Qera	(substituted on) 56'
SH	20	(Scotland) Rory Lawson	(substituted on) 56'
WG	21	(Samoa) Sailosi Tagicakibau	(substituted on) 46'
FB	22	(France) Cédric Heymans	(substituted on) 66'
Coach:
(New Zealand) John Kirwan

- The Welsh Rugby Union announced that this would be a fully capped match. As a result, Martyn Williams became the third Welsh player with 100 caps when he came off the bench. It was also announced that this match would be the last international appearance of Martyn Williams and Wales top try-scorer Shane Williams.
- Four players made their full international debuts for Wales: Rhodri Jones, Harry Robinson, Liam Williams and Adam Warren.

=== Week 3 ===
5 June 2012
19:30 AEST (UTC+10)

Australia	6–9	Scotland
Pen: Harris (2/2) 32', 42'	Report	Pen: Laidlaw (3/4) 22', 27', 80'

Newcastle International Sports Centre, Newcastle
Attendance: 20,088
Referee: Jaco Peyper (South Africa)

FB	15	Luke Morahan
RW	14	Joe Tomane
OC	13	Anthony Fainga'a
IC	12	Mike Harris
LW	11	Digby Ioane
FH	10	Berrick Barnes
SH	9	Will Genia
N8	8	Scott Higginbotham
OF	7	David Pocock (c)
BF	6	Dave Dennis	(substituted off) 65'
RL	5	Nathan Sharpe
LL	4	Sitaleki Timani	(substituted off) 54'
TP	3	Dan Palmer	(substituted off) 70'
HK	2	Stephen Moore
LP	1	James Slipper
Replacements:
HK	16	Saia Fainga'a
PR	17	Ben Alexander	(substituted on) 70'
LK	18	Rob Simmons	(substituted on) 54'
FL	19	Michael Hooper	(substituted on) 65'
SH	20	Nick Phipps
CE	21	Pat McCabe
WG	22	Adam Ashley-Cooper
Coach:
(New Zealand) Robbie Deans

FB	15	Stuart Hogg
RW	14	Joe Ansbro
OC	13	Nick De Luca
IC	12	Matt Scott
LW	11	Sean Lamont	(substituted off) 38'
FH	10	Greig Laidlaw
SH	9	Mike Blair	(substituted off) 63'
N8	8	John Barclay
OF	7	Ross Rennie
BF	6	Alasdair Strokosch
RL	5	Richie Gray
LL	4	Alastair Kellock
TP	3	Euan Murray
HK	2	Ross Ford (c)
LP	1	Ryan Grant
Replacements:
HK	16	Scott Lawson
PR	17	Jon Welsh
LK	18	Tom Ryder
N8	19	Richie Vernon
SH	20	Chris Cusiter	(substituted on) 63'
FH	21	Duncan Weir
FB	22	Tom Brown	(substituted on) 38'
Coach:
(England) Andy Robinson

Assistant referees:
Craig Joubert (South Africa)
Keith Brown (New Zealand)
Television match official:
Vinny Munro (New Zealand)

- Scotland claimed their first win in Australia since 1982.
- Six players made their full international debut for Australia: Dan Palmer, Dave Dennis, Michael Hooper, Mike Harris, Joe Tomane and Luke Morahan.
- Two players made their full international debut for Scotland: Ryan Grant and Tom Brown.

9 June 2012
19:35 NZST (UTC+12)

New Zealand	42–10	Ireland
Try: Savea (3) 25' c, 37' c, 43' c Thomson 54' m Smith 77' c Con: Carter (4/5) 26', 38', 45, 78; Pen: Carter (3/3) 5', 14', 17'	Report	Try: McFadden 48' c Con: Sexton (1/1) 49'; Pen: Sexton (1/1) 7'

Eden Park, Auckland
Attendance: 43,300
Referee: Nigel Owens (Wales)

FB	15	Israel Dagg
RW	14	Zac Guildford	(substituted off) 52'
OC	13	Conrad Smith
IC	12	Sonny Bill Williams
LW	11	Julian Savea	(substituted off) 64'
FH	10	Dan Carter
SH	9	Aaron Smith	(substituted off) 56'
N8	8	Kieran Read
OF	7	Richie McCaw (c)
BF	6	Victor Vito	(substituted off) 46'
RL	5	Sam Whitelock
LL	4	Brodie Retallick	(substituted off) 52'
TP	3	Owen Franks	(substituted off) 61'
HK	2	Andrew Hore	(substituted off) 61'
LP	1	Tony Woodcock
Replacements:
HK	16	Hika Elliot	(substituted on) 61'
PR	17	Ben Franks	(substituted on) 61'
LK	18	Ali Williams	(substituted on) 52'
FL	19	Adam Thomson	(substituted on) 46'
SH	20	Piri Weepu	(substituted on) 56'
FH	21	Aaron Cruden	(substituted on) 64'
WG	22	Ben Smith	(substituted on) 52'
Coach:
(New Zealand) Steve Hansen

FB	15	Rob Kearney
RW	14	Fergus McFadden
OC	13	Brian O'Driscoll (c)
IC	12	Keith Earls	(substituted off) 72'
LW	11	Simon Zebo
FH	10	Johnny Sexton	(substituted off) 57'
SH	9	Conor Murray	(substituted off) 61'
N8	8	Jamie Heaslip
OF	7	Seán O'Brien
BF	6	Peter O'Mahony	(substituted off) 61'
RL	5	Donnacha Ryan
LL	4	Dan Tuohy	(substituted off) 61'
TP	3	Declan Fitzpatrick	(substituted off) 55'
HK	2	Rory Best
LP	1	Cian Healy	(substituted off) 71'
Replacements:
HK	16	Seán Cronin	(substituted on) 71'
PR	17	Ronan Loughney	(substituted on) 55'
LK	18	Donncha O'Callaghan	(substituted on) 61'
N8	19	Kevin McLaughlin	(substituted on) 61'
SH	20	Eoin Reddan	(substituted on) 61'
FH	21	Ronan O'Gara	(substituted on) 57'
OC	22	Darren Cave	(substituted on) 72'
Coach:
(Ireland) Declan Kidney

Assistant referees:
Jaco Peyper (South Africa)
James Leckie (Australia)
Television match official:
Matt Goddard (Australia)

- Three players made their full international debut for New Zealand: Brodie Retallick, Julian Savea and Aaron Smith.
- Three players made their full international debut for Ireland: Simon Zebo, Declan Fitzpatrick and Ronan Loughney.

9 June 2012
20:00 AEST (UTC+10)

Australia	27–19	Wales
Try: Higginbotham 14' c Genia 40' c McCabe 66' c Con: Barnes (3/3) 15', 42', 67'; Pen: Barnes (1/3) 8'; Drop: Barnes (1/1) 49'	Report	Try: Cuthbert 57' c Con: Halfpenny (1/1) 59'; Pen: Halfpenny (4/4) 21', 45', 55', 62'

Suncorp Stadium, Brisbane
Attendance: 43,000
Referee: Craig Joubert (South Africa)

FB	15	Adam Ashley-Cooper
RW	14	Cooper Vuna			(substituted off) 71'
OC	13	Rob Horne	50' to 55'
IC	12	Pat McCabe
LW	11	Digby Ioane
FH	10	Berrick Barnes
SH	9	Will Genia
N8	8	Wycliff Palu	(substituted off) 58'
OF	7	David Pocock (c)
BF	6	Scott Higginbotham
RL	5	Nathan Sharpe	(substituted off) 64'
LL	4	Rob Simmons
TP	3	Sekope Kepu
HK	2	Tatafu Polota-Nau	(substituted off) 55'
LP	1	Benn Robinson	(substituted off) 58'
Replacements:
HK	16	Stephen Moore	(substituted on) 55'
PR	17	Ben Alexander	(substituted on) 58'
FL	18	Dave Dennis	(substituted on) 64'
FL	19	Michael Hooper	(substituted on) 58'
SH	20	Nic White
OC	21	Anthony Fainga'a	(substituted on) 50'	(substituted off) 55'	(substituted on) 71'
IC	22	Mike Harris
Coach:
(New Zealand) Robbie Deans

FB	15	Leigh Halfpenny
RW	14	Alex Cuthbert
OC	13	Jonathan Davies
IC	12	Scott Williams	(substituted off) 55'
LW	11	George North	(substituted off) 28'
FH	10	Rhys Priestland
SH	9	Mike Phillips
N8	8	Taulupe Faletau	(substituted off) 51'
OF	7	Sam Warburton (c)
BF	6	Dan Lydiate
RL	5	Luke Charteris	(substituted off) 51'
LL	4	Bradley Davies
TP	3	Adam Jones	(substituted off) 75'
HK	2	Ken Owens	(substituted off) 51'
LP	1	Gethin Jenkins
Replacements:
HK	16	Matthew Rees	(substituted on) 51'
PR	17	Paul James	(substituted on) 75'
LK	18	Alun Wyn Jones	(substituted on) 51'
N8	19	Ryan Jones	(substituted on) 51'
SH	20	Lloyd Williams
FH	21	James Hook	(substituted on) 28'
OC	22	Ashley Beck	(substituted on) 55'
Coach:
(Wales) Rob Howley

Assistant referees:
Keith Brown (New Zealand)
Garratt Williamson (New Zealand)
Television match official:
Vinny Munro (New Zealand)

- Cooper Vuna (Australia) and Ashley Beck (Wales) made their full international debuts.

9 June 2012
17:00 SAST (UTC+02)

South Africa	22–17	England
Try: M. Steyn 47' m de Villiers 59' m Pen: M. Steyn (4/5) 13', 29', 69', 77'	Report	Try: Foden 80' m Pen: Farrell (4/4) 6', 26', 63', 65'

Mr Price Kings Park, Durban
Attendance: 43,052
Referee: Steve Walsh (Australia)

FB	15	Zane Kirchner	(substituted off) 40'
RW	14	JP Pietersen
OC	13	Jean de Villiers (c)
IC	12	Frans Steyn
LW	11	Bryan Habana	(substituted off) 31'	(substituted on) 40'
FH	10	Morné Steyn
SH	9	Francois Hougaard	(substituted off) 56'
N8	8	Pierre Spies
OF	7	Willem Alberts
BF	6	Marcell Coetzee	(substituted off) 72'
RL	5	Juandré Kruger
LL	4	Eben Etzebeth	(substituted off) 58'
TP	3	Jannie du Plessis	(substituted off) 49'	(substituted on) 58'
HK	2	Bismarck du Plessis	(substituted off) 65'
LP	1	Tendai Mtawarira	(substituted off) 58'
Replacements:
HK	16	Adriaan Strauss	(substituted on) 65'
PR	17	Coenie Oosthuizen	(substituted on) 49'
LK	18	Flip van der Merwe	(substituted on) 58'
FL	19	Keegan Daniel	(substituted on) 72'
SH	20	Ruan Pienaar	(substituted on) 56'
FB	21	Patrick Lambie	(substituted on) 40'
WG	22	Wynand Olivier	(substituted on) 31'	(substituted off) 40'
Coach:
(South Africa) Heyneke Meyer

FB	15	Mike Brown	(substituted off) 78'
RW	14	Chris Ashton
OC	13	Manu Tuilagi
IC	12	Brad Barritt	(substituted off) 53'
LW	11	Ben Foden
FH	10	Owen Farrell
SH	9	Ben Youngs	(substituted off) 72'
N8	8	Ben Morgan
OF	7	Chris Robshaw (c)
BF	6	Tom Johnson
RL	5	Geoff Parling
LL	4	Mouritz Botha	(substituted off) 58'
TP	3	Dan Cole
HK	2	Dylan Hartley	(substituted off) 75'
LP	1	Joe Marler	(substituted off) 72'
Replacements:
HK	16	Lee Mears	(substituted on) 75'
PR	17	Paul Doran-Jones	(substituted on) 72'
LK	18	Tom Palmer	(substituted on) 58'
N8	19	Phil Dowson
SH	20	Lee Dickson	(substituted on) 72'
FH	21	Toby Flood	(substituted on) 53'
FB	22	Jonathan Joseph	(substituted on) 78'
Coach:
(England) Stuart Lancaster

Assistant referees:
Alain Rolland (Ireland)
Simon McDowell (Ireland)
Television match official:
Iain Ramage (Scotland)

- Four players made their full international debut for South Africa: Marcell Coetzee, Eben Etzebeth, Juandré Kruger and Coenie Oosthuizen.
- Three players made their full international debut for England: Tom Johnson, Joe Marler and Jonathan Joseph

9 June 2012
15:40 ART (UTC-03)

Argentina	37–22	Italy
Try: Leonardi 33' c Roncero 56' c Senatore 66' c Contepomi 74' c Con: Contepomi (4/4) 34', 57, 67, 75'; Pen: Contepomi (3/4) 10', 28', 44'	Report	Try: Penalty try 24' c Gori 54' m Ma. Bergamasco 79' c Con: Burton (1/2) 25'; Bocchino (1/1) 80'; Pen: Burton (1/1) 1'

Estadio Bicentenario, San Juan
Attendance: 10,000
Referee: Jérôme Garcès (France)

FB	15	Joaquín Tuculet
RW	14	Belisario Agulla		(substituted off) 55'
OC	13	Gabriel Ascárate
IC	12	Felipe Contepomi (c)
LW	11	Agustín Gosio
FH	10	Ignacio Mieres
SH	9	Martín Landajo		(substituted off) 73'
N8	8	Leonardo Senatore
OF	7	Tomás Leonardi		(substituted off) 70'
BF	6	Genaro Fessia		(substituted off) 50'
RL	5	Julio Farías Cabello	(yellow card) 21' to 31'
LL	4	Esteban Lozada
TP	3	Francisco Gómez Kodela		(substituted off) 58'
HK	2	Eusebio Guiñazú		(substituted off) 65'
LP	1	Rodrigo Roncero
Replacements:
HK	16	Bruno Postiglioni		(substituted on) 65'
PR	17	Nahuel Tetaz Chaparro		(substituted on) 58'
FL	18	Tomás de la Vega		(substituted on) 50'
LK	19	Santiago Guzmán		(substituted on) 70'
SH	20	Tomás Cubelli		(substituted on) 73'
WG	21	Manuel Montero		(substituted on) 55'
FB	22	Román Miralles
Coach:
(Argentina) Santiago Phelan

FB	15	Luke McLean
RW	14	Giovanbattista Venditti
OC	13	Roberto Quartaroli
IC	12	Alberto Sgarbi
LW	11	Tommaso Benvenuti
FH	10	Kris Burton	(substituted off) 68'
SH	9	Edoardo Gori
N8	8	Robert Barbieri	(substituted off) 55'
OF	7	Mauro Bergamasco
BF	6	Alessandro Zanni
RL	5	Marco Bortolami (c)	(substituted off) 44'
LL	4	Antonio Pavanello
TP	3	Martin Castrogiovanni
HK	2	Carlo Festuccia
LP	1	Alberto de Marchi
Replacements:
HK	16	Davide Giazzon
PR	17	Lorenzo Romano
LK	18	Joshua Furno	(substituted on) 44'
FL	19	Simone Favaro	(substituted on) 55'
SH	20	Tito Tebaldi
FH	21	Riccardo Bocchino	(substituted on) 68'
WG	22	Giulio Toniolatti
Coach:
(France) Jacques Brunel

Assistant referees:
George Clancy (Ireland)
Christie du Preez (South Africa)
Television match official:
Shaun Veldsman (South Africa)

- Tomas Cubelli, Ignacio Mieres, Manuel Montero, Bruno Postiglioni and Joaquin Tuculet made their full international debuts for Argentina.
- Alberto de Marchi made his full international debut for Italy.

9 June 2012
14:00 EDT (UTC-04)

Canada	28–25	United States
Try: Evans; Hearn; Carpenter; Con: Pritchard (2/3); Pen: Pritchard (3/3)	Report	Try: Hume; Paterson; LaValla; Con: Holder (2/3); Pen: Holder (2/2)

Richardson Memorial Stadium, Kingston, Ontario
Attendance: 7,521
Referee: Marius Jonker (South Africa)

FB	15	James Pritchard
RW	14	Sean Duke
OC	13	D. T. H. van der Merwe
IC	12	Mike Scholz
LW	11	Ciaran Hearn
FH	10	Matt Evans
SH	9	Sean White
N8	8	Aaron Carpenter (c)
OF	7	Chauncey O'Toole	Temporarily suspended
BF	6	Nanyak Dala
RL	5	Tyler Hotson
LL	4	Brett Beukeboom
TP	3	Andrew Tiedemann
HK	2	Ryan Hamilton
LP	1	Hubert Buydens
Replacements:
HK	16	Jason Marshall
PR	17	Tom Dolezel
FL	18	Jebb Sinclair
FL	19	Tyler Ardron
SH	20	Kyle Armstrong
FB	21	Phil Mackenzie
CR	22	Jeff Hassler
Coach:
(New Zealand) Kieran Crowley

FB	15	Chris Wyles
RW	14	James Paterson
OC	13	Paul Emerick
IC	12	Andrew Suniula
LW	11	Luke Hume
FH	10	Will Holder
SH	9	Mike Petri
N8	8	Todd Clever (c)
OF	7	Andrew Durutalo
BF	6	Scott LaValla
RL	5	Brian Doyle
LL	4	Louis Stanfill
TP	3	Eric Fry
HK	2	Chris Biller
LP	1	Mike MacDonald
Replacements:
HK	16	Derek Asbun
PR	17	Shawn Pittman
LK	18	Tom Katzfey
FL	19	Taylor Mokate
SH	20	Shaun Davies
FH	21	Roland Suniula
WG	22	Colin Hawley
Coach:
(United States) Mike Tolkin

Assistant referees:
Dave Pearson (England)
Stuart Berry (South Africa)

=== Week 4 ===
15 June 2012
19:00 EDT (UTC-04)

Canada	16–25	Italy
Try: Trainor 32' c Con: Pritchard (1/1) 33'; Pen: Pritchard (3/4) 3', 29', 52'	Report	Try: D'Apice 50' c Con: Burton (1/1) 51'; Pen: Burton (6/7) 11', 25', 40', 42', 61', 71'

BMO Field, Toronto, Ontario
Attendance: 12,220
Referee: Dave Pearson (England)

FB	15	James Pritchard
RW	14	Conor Trainor
OC	13	D. T. H. van der Merwe
IC	12	Mike Scholz	(substituted off) 63'
LW	11	Phil Mackenzie
FH	10	Matt Evans
SH	9	Sean White	(substituted off) 58'
N8	8	Aaron Carpenter (c)
OF	7	Chauncey O'Toole
BF	6	Tyler Ardron	(substituted off) 67'
RL	5	Tyler Hotson	(substituted off) 77'
LL	4	Jebb Sinclair
TP	3	Jason Marshall
HK	2	Mike Pletch	(substituted off) 58'
LP	1	Hubert Buydens	(substituted off) 15'
Replacements:
PR	16	Andrew Tiedemann	(substituted on) 58'
PR	17	Tom Dolezel	(substituted on) 15'
LK	18	Jon Phelan	(substituted on) 77'
FL	19	Nanyak Dala	(substituted on) 67'
SH	20	Ed Fairhurst	(substituted on) 58'
FH	21	Liam Underwood
WG	22	Ciaran Hearn	(substituted on) 63'
Coach:
(New Zealand) Kieran Crowley

FB	15	Alberto Benettin	(substituted off) 47'	(substituted on) 65'
RW	14	Giovanbattista Venditti
OC	13	Andrea Pratichetti
IC	12	Alberto Sgarbi
LW	11	Tommaso Benvenuti
FH	10	Kris Burton
SH	9	Tito Tebaldi	(substituted off) 58'
N8	8	Robert Barbieri
OF	7	Simone Favaro
BF	6	Alessandro Zanni
RL	5	Antonio Pavanello
LL	4	Joshua Furno	(substituted off) 61'
TP	3	Martin Castrogiovanni (c)
HK	2	Tommaso D'Apice	(substituted off) 67'
LP	1	Michele Rizzo	(substituted off) 79'
Replacements:
HK	16	Carlo Festuccia	(substituted on) 67'
PR	17	Lorenzo Romano	(substituted on) 79'
LK	18	Marco Fuser	(substituted on) 61'	(substituted off) 75'
FL	19	Mauro Bergamasco	(substituted on) 75'
SH	20	Edoardo Gori	(substituted on) 58'
FH	21	Riccardo Bocchino
FB	22	Giulio Toniolatti	(substituted on) 47'	(substituted off) 65'
Coach:
(France) Jacques Brunel

16 June 2012
19:35 NZST (UTC+12)

New Zealand	22–19	Ireland
Try: A. Smith 42' c Con: Carter (1/1) 43'; Pen: Carter (4/5) 22', 30', 35', 64'; Drop: Carter (1/1) 81'	Report	Try: Murray 11' c Con: Sexton (1/1) 12'; Pen: Sexton (4/5) 20', 47', 65', 69'

Rugby League Park, Christchurch
Attendance: 21,000
Referee: Nigel Owens (Wales)

FB	15	Israel Dagg	(yellow card) 71' to 80'
RW	14	Zac Guildford
OC	13	Conrad Smith
IC	12	Sonny Bill Williams
LW	11	Julian Savea		(substituted off) 73'
FH	10	Dan Carter
SH	9	Aaron Smith		(substituted off) 64'
N8	8	Kieran Read		(substituted off) 40'
OF	7	Richie McCaw (c)
BF	6	Adam Thomson		(substituted off) 65'	(substituted on) 69'
RL	5	Sam Whitelock
LL	4	Brodie Retallick		(substituted off) 64'	(substituted on) 65'	(substituted off) 69'
TP	3	Owen Franks		(substituted off) 57'
HK	2	Andrew Hore
LP	1	Tony Woodcock
Replacements:
HK	16	Hika Elliot
PR	17	Ben Franks		(substituted on) 57'
LK	18	Ali Williams		(substituted on) 64'
LK	19	Sam Cane		(substituted on) 40'
SH	20	Piri Weepu		(substituted on) 64'
FH	21	Aaron Cruden
WG	22	Ben Smith		(substituted on) 73'
Coach:
(New Zealand) Steve Hansen

FB	15	Rob Kearney
RW	14	Fergus McFadden
OC	13	Brian O'Driscoll (c)
IC	12	Gordon D'Arcy	(substituted off) 51'
LW	11	Andrew Trimble
FH	10	Johnny Sexton
SH	9	Conor Murray	(substituted off) 64'
N8	8	Jamie Heaslip
OF	7	Seán O'Brien
BF	6	Kevin McLaughlin	(substituted off) 61'
RL	5	Donnacha Ryan
LL	4	Dan Tuohy	(substituted off) 58'
TP	3	Mike Ross
HK	2	Rory Best
LP	1	Cian Healy
Replacements:
HK	16	Seán Cronin
PR	17	Declan Fitzpatrick
LK	18	Donncha O'Callaghan	(substituted on) 58'
N8	19	Peter O'Mahony	(substituted on) 61'
SH	20	Eoin Reddan	(substituted on) 64'
FH	21	Ronan O'Gara	(substituted on) 51'
WG	22	Simon Zebo
Coach:
(Ireland) Declan Kidney

Assistant referees:
Romain Poite (France)
Pascal Gaüzère (France)
Television match official:
Matt Goddard (Australia)

- This was Ireland's first test match in Christchurch.

16 June 2012
20:00 AEST (UTC+10)

Australia	25–23	Wales
Try: Horne 38' c Con: Barnes (1/1) 39'; Pen: Barnes (5/6) 19', 29', 47', 58', 64'; Harris (1/1) 80'	Report	Try: North 3' c Davies 43' c Con: Halfpenny (2/2) 4', 44'; Pen: Halfpenny (3/3) 49', 60', 66'

Etihad Stadium, Melbourne
Attendance: 33,880
Referee: Chris Pollock (New Zealand)

FB	15	Adam Ashley-Cooper
RW	14	Cooper Vuna	(yellow card) 59' to 69'	(substituted off) 70'
OC	13	Rob Horne
IC	12	Pat McCabe
LW	11	Digby Ioane
FH	10	Berrick Barnes		(substituted off) 72'
SH	9	Will Genia
N8	8	Wycliff Palu		(substituted off) 54'
OF	7	David Pocock (c)
BF	6	Scott Higginbotham
RL	5	Nathan Sharpe
LL	4	Rob Simmons		(substituted off) 69'
TP	3	Sekope Kepu
HK	2	Tatafu Polota-Nau		(substituted off) 50'
LP	1	Benn Robinson		(substituted off) 64'
Replacements:
HK	16	Stephen Moore		(substituted on) 50'
PR	17	Ben Alexander		(substituted on) 64'
FL	18	Dave Dennis		(substituted on) 54'
FL	19	Michael Hooper		(substituted on) 69'
SH	20	Nic White
OC	21	Anthony Fainga'a		(substituted on) 70'
IC	22	Mike Harris		(substituted on) 72'
Coach:
(New Zealand) Robbie Deans

FB	15	Leigh Halfpenny
RW	14	Alex Cuthbert
OC	13	Jonathan Davies
IC	12	Ashley Beck
LW	11	George North
FH	10	Rhys Priestland
SH	9	Mike Phillips	(substituted off) 65'
N8	8	Ryan Jones
OF	7	Sam Warburton (c)
BF	6	Dan Lydiate
RL	5	Alun Wyn Jones	(substituted off) 67'
LL	4	Bradley Davies
TP	3	Adam Jones
HK	2	Matthew Rees	(substituted off) 66'
LP	1	Gethin Jenkins
Replacements:
HK	16	Richard Hibbard	(substituted on) 66'
PR	17	Paul James
LK	18	Luke Charteris	(substituted on) 67'
N8	19	Justin Tipuric
SH	20	Rhys Webb	(substituted on) 65'
FH	21	James Hook
WG	22	Scott Williams
Coach:
(Wales) Rob Howley

Assistant referees:
Craig Joubert (South Africa)
Garratt Williamson (New Zealand)
Television match official:
Vinny Munro (New Zealand)

16 June 2012
14:00 (UTC+12)

Fiji	25–37	Scotland
Try: Domolailai 24' m Nayacalevu 48' c Talebula 64' c Con: Ralulu (2/3) 49', 65'; Pen: Ralulu (2/3) 5', 7'	Report	Try: Laidlaw 16' c Penalty try 21' c Visser (2) 36' c, 72' c Con: Laidlaw (4/4) 17', 22', 37', 72'; Pen: Laidlaw (3/3) 32', 46', 69'

Churchill Park, Lautoka
Attendance: 15,000
Referee: Jaco Peyper (South Africa)

FB	15	Isimeli Koniferedi	(substituted off) 60'
RW	14	Waisea Nayacalevu
OC	13	Vereniki Goneva
IC	12	Aloisio Buto	(substituted off) 58'
LW	11	Watisoni Votu
FH	10	Jonetani Ralulu
SH	9	Nikola Matawalu	(substituted off) 66'
N8	8	Netani Talei (c)
OF	7	Malakai Ravulo	(substituted off) 17'
BF	6	Iliesa Ratuva	(substituted off) 70'
RL	5	Leone Nakarawa
LL	4	Apisai Naikatini
TP	3	Setefano Somoca
HK	2	Viliame Veikoso	(substituted off) 60'
LP	1	Jerry Yanuyanutawa	(substituted off) 58'
Replacements:
HK	16	Talemaitoga Tuapati	(substituted on) 60'
PR	17	Waisea Daveta	(substituted on) 58'
FL	18	Josefa Domolailai	(substituted on) 17'
LK	19	Kelepi Ketedromo	(substituted on) 70'
SH	20	Nemia Kenatale	(substituted on) 66'
WG	21	Kameli Ratuvou	(substituted on) 58'
FB	22	Metuisela Talebula	(substituted on) 60'
Coach:
(Fiji) Inoke Male

FB	15	Stuart Hogg
RW	14	Max Evans	(substituted off) 62'
OC	13	Nick De Luca
IC	12	Matt Scott
LW	11	Tim Visser
FH	10	Greig Laidlaw	(substituted off) 77'
SH	9	Mike Blair	(substituted off) 55'
N8	8	John Barclay	(substituted off) 58'
OF	7	Ross Rennie
BF	6	Alasdair Strokosch
RL	5	Richie Gray	(substituted off) 78'
LL	4	Alastair Kellock
TP	3	Euan Murray	(substituted off) 66'
HK	2	Ross Ford (c)	(substituted off) 77'
LP	1	Ryan Grant
Replacements:
HK	16	Scott Lawson	(substituted on) 77'
PR	17	Geoff Cross	(substituted on) 66'
LK	18	Tom Ryder	(substituted on) 78'
FL	19	Richie Vernon	(substituted on) 58'
SH	20	Chris Cusiter	(substituted on) 55'
FH	21	Duncan Weir	(substituted on) 77'
WG	22	Sean Lamont	(substituted on) 62'
Coach:
(England) Andy Robinson

Assistant referees:
Ian Smith (Australia)
Andrew Lees (Australia)

- Tim Visser made his debut for Scotland, only four days after becoming eligible by completing three years' residency.

16 June 2012
17:00 SAST (UTC+02)

South Africa	36–27	England
Try: Alberts 4' m B. du Plessis 9' c Hougaard 19' c Pietersen 73' m Con: M. Steyn (2/4) 10', 20'; Pen: M. Steyn (3/6) 15', 46', 58'; Drop: M. Steyn (1/1) 26'	Report	Try: Flood 23' c Youngs (2) 51' c, 61' c Con: Flood (3/3) 24', 52', 62'; Pen: Flood (2/2) 9', 64'

Ellis Park Stadium, Johannesburg
Attendance: 60,101
Referee: Alain Rolland (Ireland)

FB	15	Patrick Lambie	(substituted off) 44'
RW	14	JP Pietersen
OC	13	Jean de Villiers (c)
IC	12	Frans Steyn
LW	11	Bryan Habana	(substituted off) 57'
FH	10	Morné Steyn
SH	9	Francois Hougaard
N8	8	Pierre Spies
OF	7	Willem Alberts	(substituted off) 52'
BF	6	Marcell Coetzee
RL	5	Juandré Kruger	(substituted off) 62'
LL	4	Eben Etzebeth
TP	3	Jannie du Plessis	(substituted off) 59'
HK	2	Bismarck du Plessis	(substituted off) 60'
LP	1	Tendai Mtawarira
Replacements:
HK	16	Adriaan Strauss	(substituted on) 60'
PR	17	Werner Kruger	(substituted on) 59'
LK	18	Flip van der Merwe	(substituted on) 62'
FL	19	Keegan Daniel	(substituted on) 52'
SH	20	Ruan Pienaar	(substituted on) 57'
WG	21	Wynand Olivier	(substituted on) 44'
FB	22	Bjorn Basson
Coach:
(South Africa) Heyneke Meyer

FB	15	Ben Foden
RW	14	Chris Ashton
OC	13	Jonathan Joseph	(substituted off) 77'
IC	12	Manu Tuilagi
LW	11	David Strettle	(substituted off) 59'
FH	10	Toby Flood
SH	9	Ben Youngs	(substituted off) 74'
N8	8	Ben Morgan	(substituted off) 46'
OF	7	Chris Robshaw (c)
BF	6	Tom Johnson
RL	5	Geoff Parling
LL	4	Mouritz Botha	(substituted off) 44'
TP	3	Dan Cole	(substituted off) 49'	(substituted on) 56'
HK	2	Dylan Hartley	(substituted off) 74'
LP	1	Joe Marler	(substituted off) 56'
Replacements:
HK	16	Lee Mears	(substituted on) 74'
PR	17	Alex Corbisiero	(substituted on) 49'
LK	18	Tom Palmer	(substituted on) 44'
FL	19	Thomas Waldrom	(substituted on) 46'
SH	20	Lee Dickson	(substituted on) 74'
FH	21	Owen Farrell	(substituted on) 59'
FB	22	Alex Goode	(substituted on) 77'
Coach:
(England) Stuart Lancaster

Assistant referees:
Steve Walsh (Australia)
Simon McDowell (Ireland)
Television match official:
Iain Ramage (Scotland)

16 June 2012
18:10 ART (UTC-03)

Argentina	23–20	France
Try: Agulla 4' c Montero 76' c Con: Contepomi (2/2) 5', 77'; Pen: Contepomi (3/6) 24', 39', 56'	Report	Try: Picamoles 26' m Pen: Parra (4/5) 3', 10', 22', 43'; Trinh-Duc (1/1) 52'

Estadio Mario Alberto Kempes, Córdoba
Attendance: 40,000
Referee: George Clancy (Ireland)

FB	15	Román Miralles		(substituted off) 40'
RW	14	Belisario Agulla
OC	13	Joaquín Tuculet
IC	12	Felipe Contepomi (c)
LW	11	Manuel Montero
FH	10	Ignacio Mieres
SH	9	Martín Landajo		(substituted off) 48'
N8	8	Tomás Leonardi	(yellow card) 51' to 61'
OF	7	Tomás de la Vega
BF	6	Julio Farías Cabello
RL	5	Esteban Lozada		(substituted off) 56'
LL	4	Benjamín Macome		(substituted off) 65'
TP	3	Nahuel Tetaz Chaparro		(substituted off) 56'
HK	2	Bruno Postiglioni		(substituted off) 56'
LP	1	Eusebio Guiñazú
Replacements:
HK	16	Andrés Bordoy		(substituted on) 56'
PR	17	Pablo Henn		(substituted on) 56'
LK	18	Rodrigo Bruno		(substituted on) 65'
LK	19	Rodrigo Báez		(substituted on) 56'
SH	20	Tomás Cubelli		(substituted on) 48'
FB	21	Benjamín Urdapilleta		(substituted on) 40'
WG	22	Facundo Barrea
Coach:
(Argentina) Santiago Phelan

FB	15	Brice Dulin
RW	14	Jean-Marcellin Buttin
OC	13	Wesley Fofana
IC	12	Florian Fritz	(substituted off) 78'
LW	11	Yoann Huget
FH	10	François Trinh-Duc	(substituted off) 58'
SH	9	Morgan Parra
N8	8	Louis Picamoles	(substituted off) 66'
OF	7	Fulgence Ouedraogo
BF	6	Wenceslas Lauret
RL	5	Yoann Maestri	(substituted off) 74'
LL	4	Pascal Papé (c)
TP	3	David Attoub
HK	2	Dimitri Szarzewski	(substituted off) 66'
LP	1	Yvan Watremez	(substituted off) 40'
Replacements:
HK	16	Christopher Tolofua	(substituted on) 66'
PR	17	Vincent Debaty	(substituted on) 40'
LK	18	Romain Taofifenua	(substituted on) 74'
FL	19	Alexandre Lapandry	(substituted on) 66'
SH	20	Maxime Machenaud
FH	21	Frédéric Michalak	(substituted on) 58'
CE	22	Maxime Mermoz	(substituted on) 78'
Coach:
(France) Philippe Saint-André

Assistant referees:
Wayne Barnes (England)
Christie du Preez (South Africa)
Television match official:
Shaun Veldsman (South Africa)

- Brice Dulin, Romain Taofifenua, Christopher Tolofua and Yvan Watremez made their full international debuts for France in this match.
- Rodrigo Baez made his full international debut for Argentina in this match.

16 June 2012
19:00 MDT (UTC-06)

United States	36–20	Georgia
Try: A. Suniula 10' m Paterson 26' c Petri 35' c Clever 73' m Con: Wyles (2/4); Pen: Wyles (4/7) 2', 23', 39', 59'	Report	Try: Kvirikashvili 18' m Sharikadze 50' m Kacharava 60' c Con: Kvirikashvili (1/3); Pen: Kvirikashvili (1/1) 32'

Infinity Park, Glendale, Colorado
Attendance: 3,800
Referee: Marius Jonker (South Africa)

FB	15	Chris Wyles
RW	14	Luke Hume
OC	13	Paul Emerick	(substituted off) 40'
IC	12	Andrew Suniula
LW	11	James Paterson
FH	10	Roland Suniula	(substituted off) 78'
SH	9	Mike Petri	(substituted off) 75'
N8	8	Todd Clever (c)
OF	7	Scott LaValla
BF	6	Taylor Mokate	(substituted off) 48'
RL	5	Brian Doyle
LL	4	Louis Stanfill
TP	3	Eric Fry	(substituted off) 75'
HK	2	Chris Biller	(substituted off) 78'
LP	1	Shawn Pittman
Replacements:
HK	16	Derek Asbun	(substituted on) 78'
PR	17	Tolifili Liufau	(substituted on) 75'
PR	18	Mike MacDonald
FL	19	Andrew Durutalo	(substituted on) 48'
SH	20	Shaun Davies	(substituted on) 75'
FH	21	Will Holder	(substituted on) 78'
CE	22	Colin Hawley	(substituted on) 40'
Coach:
(United States) Mike Tolkin

FB	15	Lasha Khmaladze
RW	14	Irakli Machkhaneli
OC	13	Davit Kacharava
IC	12	Merab Sharikadze
LW	11	Sandro Todua	(substituted off) 49'
FH	10	Merab Kvirikashvili	(substituted off) 43'
SH	9	Irakli Abuseridze (c)	(substituted off) 71'
N8	8	Giorgi Chkhaidze
OF	7	Givi Berishvili	(substituted off) 49'
BF	6	Grigol Labadze
RL	5	Vakhtang Maisuradze	(substituted off) 40'
LL	4	Beka Bitsadze
TP	3	Davit Zirakashvili
HK	2	Revaz Belkania	(substituted off) 53'
LP	1	Mikheil Nariashvili
Replacements:
HK	16	Shalva Mamukashvili	(substituted on) 53'
PR	17	Irakli Mirtskhulava
LK	18	Zviad Maisuradze	(substituted on) 40'
FL	19	Giorgi Tkhilaishvili	(substituted on) 49'
SH	20	Giorgi Begadze	(substituted on) 71'
FH	21	Lasha Malaguradze	(substituted on) 43'
WG	22	Irakli Kiasashvili	(substituted on) 49'
Coach:
(New Zealand) Milton Haig

Assistant referees:
Jérôme Garcès (France)
Dave Smortchevsky (Canada)

- Three players made their full international debuts for the USA: Derek Asbun, Shaun Davies, and Tolifili Liufau.

=== Week 5 ===
20 June 2012
19:30 JST (UTC+09)

Japan	21–40	French Barbarians
Try: Ono 33' c Tamura 41' c Ito 68' c Con: Tamura (3/3) 33', 41', 68'	Report	Try: Lapeyre (2) 2' m, 30' c Lacrampe 10' c O'Connor 40' c Arias 80' m Con: Lopez (3/5) 11', 30', 40'; Pen: Lapeyre (1/1) 23'; Lopez (1/1) 38'; Bernard (1/1) 79'

Chichibunomiya Rugby Stadium, Tokyo
Attendance: 9,761
Referee: Bryce Lawrence (New Zealand)

FB	15	Yasunori Nagatomo
RW	14	Toshiaki Hirose (c)	(substituted off) 60'
OC	13	Tomohiro Senba
IC	12	Yu Tamura
LW	11	Sho Takenaka
FH	10	Kosei Ono
SH	9	Jun Fujii	(substituted off) 60'
N8	8	Shoji Ito
OF	7	Takamichi Sasaki	(substituted off) 65'
BF	6	Tsuyoshi Murata	(substituted off) 57'
RL	5	Michael Broadhurst
LL	4	Koji Shinozuka
TP	3	Hiroshi Yamashita	(substituted off) 62'
HK	2	Ryuhei Arita	(substituted off) 41'
LP	1	Masakazu Nagano
Replacements:
HK	16	Takeshi Kizu	(substituted on) 41'
PR	17	Hidetatsu Tuboi	(substituted on) 62'
LK	18	Shinya Makabe	(substituted on) 57'
FL	19	Yusaku Kuwazuru
SH	20	Keisuke Uchida	(substituted on) 60'
CE	21	Harumichi Tatekawa	(substituted on) 65'
FB	22	Ayumu Goromaru	(substituted on) 60'
Coach:
(New Zealand) Eddie Jones

FB	15	(France) Benjamin Lapeyre
RW	14	(France) Julien Arias
OC	13	(France) Henry Chavancy
IC	12	(France) Guillaume Boussès		(substituted off) 60'
LW	11	(France) Marvin O'Connor
FH	10	(France) Camille Lopez	(yellow card) 12' to 22'	(substituted off) 60'
SH	9	(France) Thierry Lacrampe	(yellow card) 50' to 60'
N8	8	(France) Damien Chouly
OF	7	(France) Pierre Rabadan		(substituted off) 61'	(substituted on) 70'
BF	6	(France) Ibrahim Diarra		(substituted off) 70'
RL	5	(France) Romain Millo-Chluski
LL	4	(France) Matthias Rolland		(substituted off) 53'
TP	3	(France) Rabah Slimani		(substituted off) 53'	(substituted on) 77'
HK	2	(France) William Servat (c)		(substituted off) 70'
LP	1	(France) Yannick Forestier		(substituted off) 77'
Replacements:
HK	16	(France) Mathieu Bonello		(substituted on) 70'
PR	17	(France) Aretz Iguiniz		(substituted on) 53'
LK	18	(Cameroon) Robins Tchalé-Watchou		(substituted on) 53'
FL	19	(South Africa) Antonie Claassen		(substituted on) 61'
FH	20	(France) Pierre Bernard		(substituted on) 60'
UB	21	(France) Romain Teulet
FB	22	(France) Hugo Bonneval		(substituted on) 60'
Coach:
(France) Laurent Labit and Laurent Travers

- This match was the first ever encounter between Japan and the French Barbarians. (Both teams had however played twice against each other in Sevens tournaments, at the Hong Kong Sevens in 1987 and at the Air France Sevens in 1999, the Baa-Baas claiming both victories.)
- Pierre Bernard, Hugo Bonneval (following in his father Eric's footsteps), Henry Chavancy, Ibrahim Diarra, Thierry Lacrampe, Camille Lopez, Romain Millo-Chluski, Marvin O'Connor, Rabah Slimani and captain William Servat all made their debuts in the blue-striped shirt.

23 June 2012
15:30 SST (UTC+13)

Samoa	16–17	Scotland
Try: T. Pisi 61' c Con: T. Pisi (1/1) 62'; Pen: T. Pisi (2/3) 23', 42'; Drop: T. Pisi 15'	Report	Try: Ansbro 17' c Harley 78' c Con: Laidlaw (2/2) 18', 79'; Pen: Laidlaw (1/1) 51'

Apia Park, Apia
Referee: Jaco Peyper (South Africa)

FB	15	Fa’atoina Autagavaia
RW	14	Paul Perez
OC	13	Fautua Otto	(substituted off) 28'
IC	12	Paul Williams
LW	11	David Lemi (c)
FH	10	Tusi Pisi
SH	9	Kahn Fotuali'i	(substituted off) 79'
N8	8	Kane Thompson
OF	7	Maurie Fa'asavalu
BF	6	Ben Masoe	(substituted off) 58'
RL	5	Daniel Crichton	(substituted off) 40'
LL	4	Fa’atiga Lemalu
TP	3	Census Johnston	(substituted off) 40'	(substituted on) 73'	(substituted off) 76'
HK	2	Ti’i Paulo	(substituted off) 64'
LP	1	Sakaria Taulafo	(substituted off) 73'	(substituted on) 76'
Replacements:
HK	16	Ole Avei	(substituted on) 64'
PR	17	Logovi'i Mulipola	(substituted on) 40'
LK	18	Joe Tekori	(substituted on) 40'
FL	19	Afa Aioni	(substituted on) 58'
SH	20	Jeremy Su'a	(substituted on) 79'
FH	21	Ki Anufe
FB	22	Lolo Lui	(substituted on) 28'
Coach:
(Samoa) Stephen Betham

FB	15	Stuart Hogg
RW	14	Sean Lamont
OC	13	Joe Ansbro	(substituted off) 58'
IC	12	Matt Scott
LW	11	Tim Visser
FH	10	Greig Laidlaw
SH	9	Chris Cusiter	(substituted off) 44'
N8	8	Richie Vernon	(substituted off) 63'
OF	7	Ross Rennie
BF	6	Alasdair Strokosch
RL	5	Alastair Kellock	(substituted off) 70'
LL	4	Richie Gray
TP	3	Euan Murray
HK	2	Ross Ford (c)	(substituted off) 64'
LP	1	Ryan Grant
Replacements:
HK	16	Scott Lawson	(substituted on) 64'
PR	17	Geoff Cross
LK	18	Tom Ryder	(substituted on) 70'
FL	19	Rob Harley	(substituted on) 63'
SH	20	Mike Blair	(substituted on) 44'
FH	21	Duncan Weir
WG	22	Max Evans	(substituted on) 58'
Coach:
(England) Andy Robinson

Assistant referees:
Ian Smith (Australia)
Andrew Lees (Australia)

- Originally, New Zealand referee Chris Pollock was meant to referee this match, but due to injury, Jaco Peyper of South Africa was the referee. He also refereed both the Australia and the Fiji games.
- It was announced 50 minutes before kick-off that Nick De Luca was out of the match due to a thigh strain, and would be replaced by Joe Ansbro.

23 June 2012
15:00 AEST (UTC+10)

Australia	20–19	Wales
Try: Horne 64' m Pen: Barnes (5/5) 3', 9', 16', 38', 74'	Report	Try: R. Jones 60' c Con: Halfpenny (1/1) 61'; Pen: Halfpenny (4/5) 7', 13', 24', 70'

Sydney Football Stadium, Sydney
Attendance: 42,889
Referee: Craig Joubert (South Africa)

FB	15	Kurtley Beale
RW	14	Adam Ashley-Cooper
OC	13	Rob Horne
IC	12	Pat McCabe	(substituted off) 34'
LW	11	Digby Ioane
FH	10	Berrick Barnes
SH	9	Will Genia
N8	8	Wycliff Palu
OF	7	David Pocock (c)
BF	6	Scott Higginbotham	(substituted off) 56'
RL	5	Nathan Sharpe
LL	4	Sitaleki Timani	(substituted off) 72'
TP	3	Sekope Kepu	(substituted off) 56'
HK	2	Tatafu Polota-Nau	(substituted off) 56'
LP	1	Benn Robinson
Replacements:
HK	16	Stephen Moore	(substituted on) 56'
PR	17	Ben Alexander	(substituted on) 56'
LK	18	Rob Simmons	(substituted on) 72'
FL	19	Dave Dennis	(substituted on) 56'
FL	20	Michael Hooper
SH	21	Nic White
OC	22	Anthony Fainga'a	(substituted on) 34'
Coach:
(New Zealand) Robbie Deans

FB	15	Leigh Halfpenny
RW	14	Alex Cuthbert
OC	13	Jonathan Davies
IC	12	Ashley Beck	(substituted off) 65'
LW	11	George North
FH	10	Rhys Priestland	(substituted off) 69'
SH	9	Mike Phillips
N8	8	Ryan Jones	(substituted off) 49'	(substituted on) 56'
OF	7	Sam Warburton (c)	(substituted off) 28'
BF	6	Dan Lydiate
RL	5	Alun Wyn Jones	(substituted off) 65'
LL	4	Bradley Davies
TP	3	Adam Jones
HK	2	Matthew Rees	(substituted off) 65'
LP	1	Gethin Jenkins	(substituted off) 40'
Replacements:
HK	16	Ken Owens	(substituted on) 65'
PR	17	Paul James	(substituted on) 40'
LK	18	Luke Charteris	(substituted on) 49'	(substituted off) 56'	(substituted on) 65'
N8	19	Justin Tipuric	(substituted on) 28'
SH	20	Rhys Webb
FH	21	James Hook	(substituted on) 69'
WG	22	Scott Williams	(substituted on) 65'
Coach:
(Wales) Rob Howley

Assistant referees:
Jaco Peyper (South Africa)
Jonathon White (New Zealand)
Television match official:
Vinny Munro (New Zealand)

23 June 2012
19:35 NZST (UTC+12)

New Zealand	60–0	Ireland
Try: Cane (2) 6' c, 43' c S.B. Williams (2) 11' c, 18' c B. Smith 22' m Gear 49' m Messam 57' m Dagg 62' c Thomson 72' c Con: Cruden (2/2) 7', 12'; Dagg (1/2) 19'; Barrett (3/3) 44', 63', 73'; Pen: Barrett (1/1) 40'	Report

Waikato Stadium, Hamilton
Attendance: 25,100
Referee: Romain Poite (France)

FB	15	Israel Dagg
RW	14	Ben Smith
OC	13	Conrad Smith	(substituted off) 60'
IC	12	Sonny Bill Williams
LW	11	Hosea Gear
FH	10	Aaron Cruden	(substituted off) 23'
SH	9	Aaron Smith	(substituted off) 60'
N8	8	Richie McCaw (c)
OF	7	Sam Cane	(substituted off) 69'
BF	6	Liam Messam
RL	5	Sam Whitelock	(substituted off) 57'
LL	4	Luke Romano
TP	3	Owen Franks
HK	2	Andrew Hore	(substituted off) 43'
LP	1	Tony Woodcock	(substituted off) 76'
Replacements:
HK	16	Keven Mealamu	(substituted on) 43'
PR	17	Ben Franks	(substituted on) 76'
LK	18	Brodie Retallick	(substituted on) 57'
FL	19	Adam Thomson	(substituted on) 69'
SH	20	Piri Weepu	(substituted on) 60'
FH	21	Beauden Barrett	(substituted on) 23'
IC	22	Tamati Ellison	(substituted on) 60'
Coach:
(New Zealand) Steve Hansen

FB	15	Rob Kearney	(yellow card) 40' to 50'
RW	14	Fergus McFadden
OC	13	Brian O'Driscoll (c)
IC	12	Paddy Wallace		(substituted off) 54'
LW	11	Keith Earls		(substituted off) 50'	(substituted on) 54'	(substituted off) 73'
FH	10	Johnny Sexton
SH	9	Conor Murray		(substituted off) 59'
N8	8	Peter O'Mahony
OF	7	Seán O'Brien
BF	6	Kevin McLaughlin		(substituted off) 54'
RL	5	Donnacha Ryan
LL	4	Dan Tuohy		(substituted off) 55'
TP	3	Mike Ross		(substituted off) 59'
HK	2	Rory Best		(substituted off) 68'
LP	1	Cian Healy
Replacements:
HK	16	Seán Cronin		(substituted on) 68'
PR	17	Declan Fitzpatrick		(substituted on) 59'
LK	18	Donncha O'Callaghan		(substituted on) 55'
FL	19	Chris Henry		(substituted on) 54'
SH	20	Eoin Reddan		(substituted on) 59'
FH	21	Ronan O'Gara		(substituted on) 54'
WG	22	Andrew Trimble		(substituted on) 50'	(substituted off) 54'	(substituted on) 73'
Coach:
(Ireland) Declan Kidney

Assistant referees:
Pascal Gauzere (France)
James Leckie (Australia)
Television match official:
Matt Goddard (Australia)

- New Zealand captain Richie McCaw picked up his 94th Test victory, breaking the all-time record he previously shared with Australia's George Gregan.

23 June 2012
17:00 SAST (UTC+02)

South Africa	14–14	England
Try: Pietersen 61' m Pen: M. Steyn (3/5) 6', 15', 27'	Report	Try: Care 11' m Pen: Flood (1/2) 2'; Farrell (2/2) 44', 71'

Nelson Mandela Bay Stadium, Port Elizabeth
Attendance: 45,000
Referee: Steve Walsh (Australia)

FB	15	Gio Aplon
RW	14	JP Pietersen
OC	13	Jean de Villiers (c)
IC	12	Wynand Olivier
LW	11	Bryan Habana
FH	10	Morné Steyn
SH	9	Francois Hougaard	(substituted off) 49'
N8	8	Pierre Spies
OF	7	Jacques Potgieter	(substituted off) 54'
BF	6	Marcell Coetzee
RL	5	Juandré Kruger
LL	4	Eben Etzebeth	(substituted off) 54'
TP	3	Jannie du Plessis	(substituted off) 75'
HK	2	Bismarck du Plessis	(substituted off) 63'
LP	1	Tendai Mtawarira
Replacements:
HK	16	Adriaan Strauss	(substituted on) 63'
PR	17	Werner Kruger	(substituted on) 75'
LK	18	Flip van der Merwe	(substituted on) 54'
FL	19	Ryan Kankowski	(substituted on) 54'
SH	20	Ruan Pienaar	(substituted on) 49'
FB	21	Elton Jantjies
WG	22	Bjorn Basson
Coach:
(South Africa) Heyneke Meyer

FB	15	Alex Goode
RW	14	Chris Ashton
OC	13	Jonathan Joseph					(substituted off) 63'
IC	12	Manu Tuilagi
LW	11	Ben Foden
FH	10	Toby Flood		(substituted off) 12'
SH	9	Danny Care
N8	8	Thomas Waldrom
OF	7	James Haskell
BF	6	Tom Johnson		(substituted off) 54'	(substituted on) 61'	(substituted off) 66'
RL	5	Geoff Parling
LL	4	Tom Palmer		(substituted off) 66'
TP	3	Dan Cole
HK	2	Dylan Hartley (c)	(yellow card) 51' to 61'
LP	1	Alex Corbisiero
Replacements:
HK	16	Lee Mears		(substituted on) 54'	(substituted off) 61'
PR	17	Joe Marler
LK	18	Mouritz Botha		(substituted on) 66'
N8	19	Phil Dowson				(substituted on) 66'
SH	20	Lee Dickson
FH	21	Owen Farrell		(substituted on) 12'	(substituted off) 27'	(substituted on) 35'
OC	22	Brad Barritt			(substituted on) 27'	(substituted off) 35'	(substituted on) 63'
Coach:
(England) Stuart Lancaster

Assistant referees:
Nigel Owens (Wales)
John Lacey (Ireland)
Television match official:
Giulio De Santis (Italy)

23 June 2012
18:10 ART (UTC-03)

Argentina	10–49	France
Try: De la Vega 74' c Con: Contepomi (1/1) 74'; Pen: Contepomi (1/1) 25'	Report	Try: Fall 11' c Huget (2) 33' c, 62' m Machenaud 39' c Mermoz 55' c Lapandry 67' c Con: Michalak (5/6) 12', 33', 40', 56', 68'; Pen: Michalak (3/3) 17', 27', 30'

Estadio Monumental José Fierro, Tucumán
Attendance: 30,000
Referee: George Clancy (Ireland)

FB	15	Joaquín Tuculet	(substituted off) 40'
RW	14	Facundo Barrea
OC	13	Agustín Gosio
IC	12	Felipe Contepomi (c)
LW	11	Manuel Montero
FH	10	Benjamín Urdapilleta
SH	9	Tomás Cubelli
N8	8	Leonardo Senatore	(substituted off) 58'
OF	7	Tomás Leonardi
BF	6	Tomás de la Vega
RL	5	Esteban Lozada
LL	4	Julio Farías Cabello	(substituted off) 27'
TP	3	Francisco Gómez Kodela
HK	2	Andrés Bordoy	(substituted off) 55'
LP	1	Eusebio Guiñazú
Replacements:
PR	16	Nahuel Tetaz Chaparro
HK	17	Bruno Postiglioni	(substituted on) 55'
LK	18	Santiago Guzmán
LK	19	Benjamin Macome	(substituted on) 27'
FL	20	Rodrigo Báez	(substituted on) 58'
SH	21	Martín Landajo
CE	22	Gabriel Ascarate	(substituted on) 40'
Coach:
(Argentina) Santiago Phelan

FB	15	Brice Dulin
RW	14	Benjamin Fall		(substituted off) 58'
OC	13	Florian Fritz
IC	12	Maxime Mermoz
LW	11	Yoann Huget
FH	10	Frédéric Michalak		(substituted off) 69'
SH	9	Maxime Machenaud		(substituted off) 69'
N8	8	Louis Picamoles		(substituted off) 64'
OF	7	Fulgence Ouedraogo
BF	6	Alexandre Lapandry		(substituted off) 79'
RL	5	Pascal Papé (c)
LL	4	Yoann Maestri		(substituted off) 47'
TP	3	David Attoub		(substituted off) 47'
HK	2	Dimitri Szarzewski		(substituted off) 56'	(substituted on) 79'
LP	1	Vincent Debaty
Replacements:
HK	16	Christopher Tolofua	(yellow card) 72' to 80'	(substituted on) 56'
PR	17	Thomas Domingo		(substituted on) 47'
LK	18	Christophe Samson		(substituted on) 47'
FL	19	Wenceslas Lauret		(substituted on) 64'
SH	20	Morgan Parra		(substituted on) 69'
FH	21	François Trinh-Duc		(substituted on) 69'
CE	22	Wesley Fofana		(substituted on) 58'
Coach:
(France) Philippe Saint-André

Assistant referees:
Wayne Barnes (England)
Christie du Preez (South Africa)
Television match official:
Shaun Veldsman (South Africa)

- Facundo Barrea made his full international debut for Argentina in this match.
- Maxime Machenaud and Christophe Samson made their full international debuts for France in this match.
- France won by a margin of 39 points, the biggest margin of victory for either side in matches between Argentina and France.

23 June 2012
14:00 PDT (UTC-07)

Canada	31–12	Georgia
Try: Van Der Merwe 5' c Pritchard 22' c Duke 42' m Con: Pritchard (2/3) 6', 23'; Pen: Pritchard (4/4) 9', 30', 40', 80'	Report	Try: Nariashvili 36' c Mamukashvili 66' m Con: Kvirikashvili (1/2) 37'

Swangard Stadium, Burnaby, British Columbia
Attendance: 3,661
Referee: Dave Pearson (England)

FB	15	James Pritchard
RW	14	D. T. H. van der Merwe
OC	13	Conor Trainor
IC	12	Phil Mackenzie
LW	11	Sean Duke
FH	10	Matt Evans
SH	9	Edward Fairhurst
N8	8	Aaron Carpenter (c)
OF	7	Nanyak Dala
BF	6	Tyler Ardron
RL	5	Tyler Hotson
LL	4	Jebb Sinclair
TP	3	Jason Marshall	Temporarily suspended
HK	2	Andrew Tiedemann
LP	1	Tom Dolezel
Replacements:
HK	16	Mike Pletch
PR	17	Doug Woolridge
LK	18	Brett Beukeboom
FL	19	Jon Phelan
SH	20	Sean White
WG	21	Jeff Hassler
WG	22	Ciaran Hearn
Coach:
(New Zealand) Kieran Crowley

FB	15	Irakli Kiasashvili
RW	14	Irakli Machkhaneli
OC	13	Davit Kacharava
IC	12	Tedo Zibzibadze
LW	11	Lexo Gugava
FH	10	Merab Kvirikashvili
SH	9	Irakli Abuseridze (c)
N8	8	Beka Bitsadze
OF	7	Giorgi Tkhilaishvili
BF	6	Gia Labadze
RL	5	Vakhtang Maisuradze
LL	4	Giorgi Chkhaidze
TP	3	Davit Zirakashvili
HK	2	Rezo Belkania
LP	1	Mikheil Nariashvili
Replacements:
HK	16	Shalva Mamukashvili
PR	17	Levan Chilachava
LK	18	Shalva Sutiashvili
FL	19	Givi Berishvili
SH	20	Bidzina Samkharadze
FH	21	Lasha Malaghuradze
CE	22	Sandro Todua
Coach:
(New Zealand) Milton Haig

Assistant referees:
Stuart Berry (South Africa)
Nick Ricono (United States)

- It was announced several minutes before kick-off that Chauncey O'Toole was out injured and Nanyak Dala had replaced him.

23 June 2012
19:30 CDT (UTC-05)

United States	10–30	Italy
Try: Emerick 31' c Con: Wyles (1/1) 32'; Pen: Wyles (1/2) 11'	Report	Try: Festuccia 7' c Gori 34' c Burton 78' c Con: Bocchino (2/2) 8', 35'; Burton (1/1) 79'; Pen: Bocchino (2/2) 17', 33'; Burton (1/1) 68'

BBVA Compass Stadium, Houston
Attendance: 17,214
Referee: Jérôme Garcès (France)

FB	15	Chris Wyles
RW	14	James Paterson		(substituted off) 40'
OC	13	Paul Emerick	(red card) 65'
IC	12	Andrew Suniula	(red card) 44'
LW	11	Luke Hume
FH	10	Roland Suniula		(substituted off) 75'
SH	9	Mike Petri		(substituted off) 75'
N8	8	Todd Clever (c)
OF	7	Scott Lavalla
BF	6	Taylor Mokate		(substituted off) 59'
RL	5	Brian Doyle		(substituted off) 71'
LL	4	Louis Stanfill
TP	3	Eric Fry		40' to 47'		(substituted off) 65'
HK	2	Chris Biller
LP	1	Shawn Pittman
Replacements:
HK	16	Derek Asbun		(substituted on) 71'
PR	17	Mike MacDonald		(substituted on) 40'	(substituted off) 47'
PR	18	Tolifili Liufau				(substituted on) 65'
FL	19	Andrew Durutalo		(substituted on) 59'
SH	20	Mose Timoteo		(substituted on) 75'
FH	21	Will Holder		(substituted on) 75'
WG	22	Colin Hawley		(substituted on) 40'
Coach:
(United States) Mike Tolkin

FB	15	Luke McLean
RW	14	Giovanbattista Venditti
OC	13	Roberto Quartaroli
IC	12	Luca Morisi
LW	11	Tommaso Benvenuti
FH	10	Riccardo Bocchino
SH	9	Edoardo Gori
N8	8	Robert Barbieri
OF	7	Mauro Bergamasco
BF	6	Alessandro Zanni
RL	5	Joshua Furno
LL	4	Antonio Pavanello
TP	3	Martin Castrogiovanni (c)
HK	2	Carlo Festuccia
LP	1	Alberto de Marchi
Replacements:
HK	16	Davide Giazzon
PR	17	Michele Rizzo
LK	18	Simone Favaro
FL	19	Tommaso D'Apice
SH	20	Tito Tebaldi
FH	21	Kris Burton
CE	22	Alberto Sgarbi
Coach:
(France) Jacques Brunel

Assistant referees:
Derek Stoltz (Canada)
Marc Nelson (United States)
Television match official:
Dave Ardrey (United States)

24 June 2012
14:00 JST (UTC+09)

Japan	18–51	French Barbarians
Try: Takenaka (40'+2') m Broadhurst 58' c Con: Goromaru (1/2) 59'; Pen: Goromaru (2/2) 29', 44'	Report	Try: Bonneval 27' c Lacrampe 31' c Bernard 57' c Gunther 66' c Claassen 68' c Rabadan 80' c Con: Teulet (2/2) 27', 80'; Bernard (4/4) 33', 57', 67', 69'; Pen: Bernard (3/3) 16', 51', 54'

Chichibunomiya Rugby Stadium, Tokyo
Attendance: 6,000

FB	15	Ayumu Goromaru
RW	14	Sho Takenaka
OC	13	Ryan Nicholas
IC	12	Harumichi Tatekawa
LW	11	Hirotoki Onozawa
FH	10	Kosei Ono	(substituted off) 53'
SH	9	Atsushi Hiwasa	(substituted off) 69'
N8	8	Hendrik Tui
OF	7	Yuta Mochizuki	(substituted off) 60'
BF	6	Takashi Kikutani	(substituted off) 67'
RL	5	Hitoshi Ono (c)
LL	4	Michael Broadhurst
TP	3	Kensuke Hatakeyama	(substituted off) 60'
HK	2	Takeshi Kizu	(substituted off) 59'
LP	1	Yusuke Nagae
Replacements:
HK	16	Ryuhei Arita	(substituted on) 59'
PR	17	Hiroshi Yamashita	(substituted on) 60'
LK	18	Shinya Makabe	(substituted on) 67'
FL	19	Shoji Ito	(substituted on) 60'
SH	20	Jun Fujii	(substituted on) 69'
WG	21	Yu Tamura	(substituted on) 53'
CR	22	Yasunori Nagatomo
Coach:
(New Zealand) Eddie Jones

FB	15	(France) Romain Teulet
RW	14	(France) Jean-Marc Mazzonetto
OC	13	(France) Henry Chavancy
IC	12	(France) Hugo Bonneval	(substituted off) 63'
LW	11	(England) Ollie Phillips
FH	10	(France) Pierre Bernard
SH	9	(France) Thierry Lacrampe	(substituted off) 58'
N8	8	(South Africa) Antonie Claassen
OF	7	(France) Pierrick Gunther
BF	6	(France) Ibrahim Diarra	(substituted off) 67'
RL	5	(Cameroon) Robins Tchalé-Watchou	(substituted off) 63'
LL	4	(France) Matthias Rolland
TP	3	(France) Aretz Iguiniz
HK	2	(France) William Servat (c)	(substituted off) 65'	(substituted on) 75'	(substituted off) 79'
LP	1	(France) Lionel Faure	51' to 57'
Replacements:
HK	16	(France) Mathieu Bonello	(substituted on) 65'	75' to 79'
PR	17	(France) Yannick Forestier	(substituted on) 51'	(substituted off) 57'
N8	18	(France) Romain Millo-Chluski	(substituted on) 63'
FL	19	(France) Pierre Rabadan	(substituted on) 67'
FH	20	(France) Marvin O'Connor
WG	21	(France) Guillaume Boussès	(substituted on) 63'
SH	22	(France) Benjamin Lapeyre	(substituted on) 58'
Coach:
(France) Laurent Labit and Laurent Travers

- Pierrick Gunther, Jean-Marc Mazzonetto and Ollie Phillips made their debuts for the French Barbarians.

== See also ==
- Mid-year rugby union test series
- 2012 Asian Five Nations
- 2012 IRB Pacific Nations Cup
- 2012 IRB Nations Cup
- 2012 Ireland rugby union tour of New Zealand
- 2012 France rugby union tour of Argentina
- 2012 England rugby union tour of South Africa
- 2012 Scotland rugby union tour of Australasia
- 2012 France rugby union tour of Argentina
