= Morgan Poi =

- Full name: Morgan Parekura Poi
- Born: 7 March 1995 (age 31) Gisborne, New Zealand
- Height: 193 cm (6 ft 4 in)
- Weight: 119 kg (262 lb; 18 st 10 lb)
- School: Napier Boys' High School
- University: Victoria University of Wellington
- Notable relative: Kimiora Poi

Rugby union career
- Position: Prop
- Current team: Wellington, Old Boys University
Senior career
Years	Team	Apps	(Points)
2017	Ngāti Porou East Coast	3	(0)
2019 –	Wellington	4	(0)
- Correct as of 28 August 2020

Morgan Poi (born 7 March 1995) is a New Zealand rugby union player who currently plays as a prop for Wellington in New Zealand's domestic Mitre 10 Cup.

== Early career ==
Poi was born in Gisborne and raised in Tikitiki, a small East Coast town roughly 90 miles from Gisborne, where he spent his earlier years. His parents making the decision to move to Napier for Poi to be educated there. He attended Napier Boys' High School and during that time played first XV rugby throughout 2011 and 2012. Captaining the side in 2012 to the National Top Four competition.

== Senior career ==
After finishing secondary school, he relocated to Wellington, attending Victoria University of Wellington and playing rugby for club rugby powerhouse Old Boys University rugby.

He was part of a dominant era of under 21 colts rugby at the club, going undefeated in 2013 and 2014. Since being elevated to the Premier side, Poi has been instrumental in the clubs 3 Jubilee Cup victories in 2015, 2017 and 2018 and accompanying celebrations at The Cambridge Hotel.

In 2015, Poi was named in the New Zealand Under-20s for the Oceania Championship and was in line for selection to the World Rugby Under 20 Championship, however he ruptured his spleen playing for the Hurricanes Development team and was consequently ruled out of contention.

Returning from injury for the Mighty Billy Goats and helping them win their second Jubilee Cup in three years, Poi's form was noticed by his home region, Ngāti Porou East Coast and was selected for their 2017 Heartland Championship campaign.

His form for club over the next couple of seasons was undeniable with Poi finally being selected for the Wellington Lions for their 2019 campaign earning four caps before once again injury struck.

Heading into the 2020 Mitre 10 Cup, Poi has once again been selected in the Wellington Lions squad.

== Personal life ==
Poi is the older brother of New Zealand netball international, Kimiora Poi.
