= Eric Fry =

American rugby union player (born 1987)

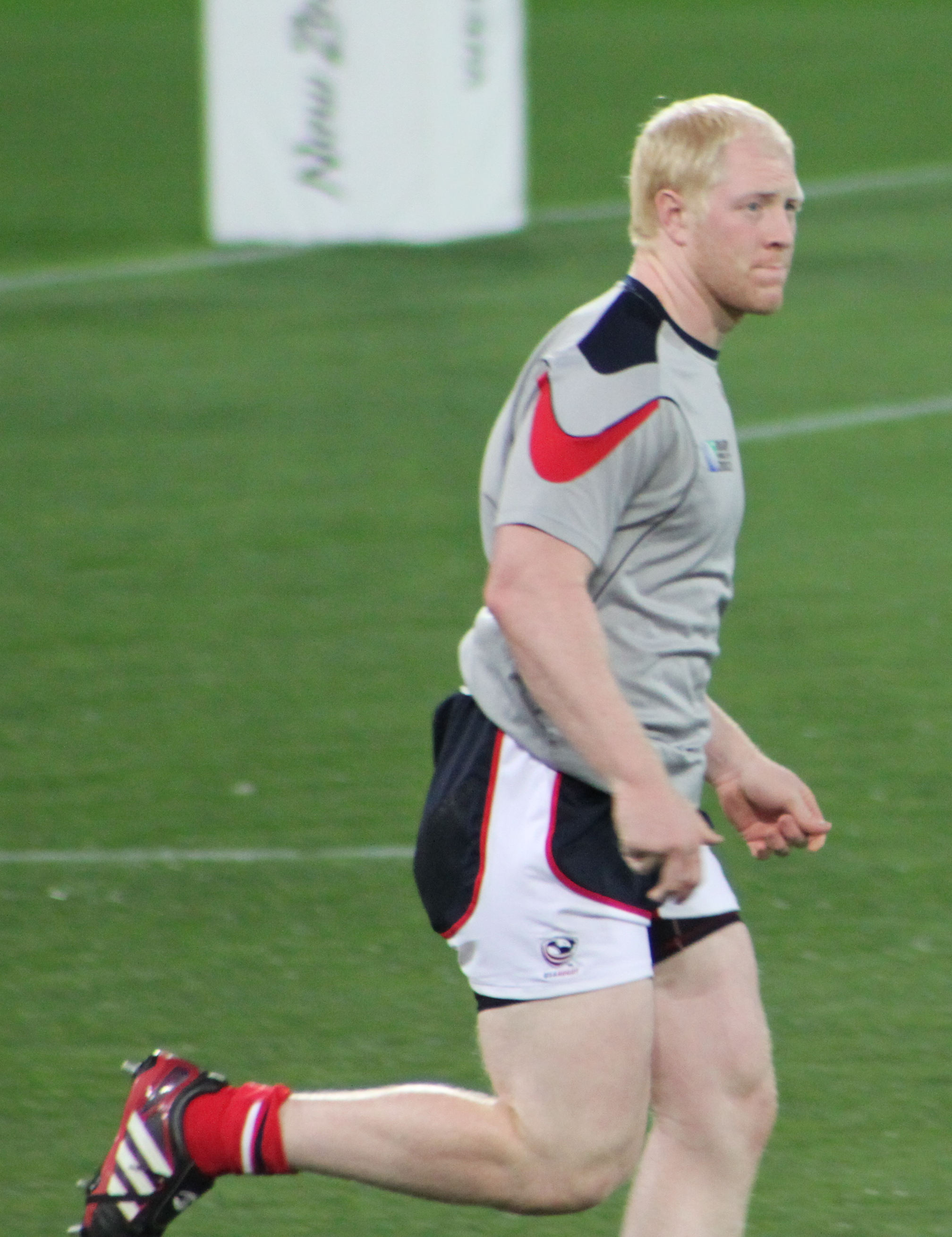
- Born: Eric Fry; August 14, 1987 (age 39) Davis, California, United States
- Height: 1.93 m (6 ft 4 in)
- Weight: 120 kg (265 lb; 18 st 13 lb)
- School: Jesuit High School (CA)
- University: University of California, Berkeley

Rugby union career
- Position: Prop
Amateur team(s)
Years	Team	Apps	(Points)
2009–2011	Las Vegas Blackjacks		
2012	Old Boys University		
2022	Oxford University RFC		
Senior career
Years	Team	Apps	(Points)
2012	Manawatu	7	(0)
2012–2014	London Scottish	23	(0)
2014–2016	Newcastle Falcons	23	(0)
2016	Sacramento Express	5	(0)
2016–2020	RC Vannes	45	(15)
- Correct as of 31 March 2021
International career
Years	Team	Apps	(Points)
2011–2019	United States	48	(15)
- Correct as of 31 March 2020

Eric Fry (born September 14, 1987) is an American international rugby union player who plays prop. Fry last played for RC Vannes of the Pro D2 in France, and previously played in the English Premiership for Newcastle Falcons and London Scottish in the RFU Championship. He can play either tighthead prop or loosehead prop, and is considered a strong scrummager with a high work rate.

== Early life ==
Fry played rugby in high school for Sacramento Jesuit, where he helped the school win the 2004 National High School Championship. He played college rugby at Cal, where he was a four time All-American selection and won four national championships.

== Club career ==
Fry began playing for Old Boys University in 2012 in The Jubilee Cup. On July 17, 2012, he signed to play for the Manawatu Turbos in the ITM Cup.

In August 2012 he joined London Scottish who compete in the RFU Rugby Championship. At the conclusion of the 2013–14 season, Fry was named in the Championship Dream XV based on his performance during the season.

After two seasons with London Scottish, Fry signed with the Newcastle Falcons for the 2014–15 Aviva Premiership season.

After two seasons with Newcastle, Fry returned to the US to join Sacramento Express on their maiden 2016 season in PRO Rugby. The move was announced on June 25, 2016, and Fry made his first appearance the following day.

Fry spent four seasons in the Pro D2 with RC Vannes from 2016 to 2020.

In April 2022 he appeared for Oxford University in their 21–17 victory over Cambridge in the 140th Varsity Match, alongside fellow American internationals, Andrew Durutalo and Nick Civetta.

== International career ==
Fry first played for the United States U-19 team in 2004–05. He was selected to tour with the United States national rugby union team, the USA Eagles, in their November 2010 tour of Europe against Portugal, Scotland A, Saracens and Georgia.

In 2011 Fry earned his first international cap as a substitute against Tonga in the Churchill Cup. He was also a member of the USA Eagles for the 2011 Rugby World Cup in New Zealand where he started against Australia. He played for the US in the June 2012 mid-year tests, starting all three matches.
