= Wainuiomata Rugby Football Club =

Rugby union team in New Zealand

Wainuiomata Rugby Football Club (WRFC) is a rugby union club based in Wainuiomata, an outlying suburb of Lower Hutt, New Zealand.

The club was formed in 1946 during the significant settlement of the area in the post-war era; mostly by young families attracted by the affordable new housing on offer.

== History ==
The club has since been through many ups and downs. The 1980s were particularly successful with the club winning many lower-grade titles. However following the 1987 season many players defected to the rival Wainuiomata Rugby League Club, with the club relegated from the Premier ranks the following season. The club would not return to Wellington's top flight until 2006.

Since returning to the Swindale Shield, Wainuiomata have won the Hardham Cup twice in 2007, defeating Oriental-Rongotai, and again in 2010, defeating Avalon and were runners-up to Upper Hutt in 2006 and Tawa in 2008. In 2011 the club qualified for the Jubilee Cup, finishing 7th, and qualified for the semi-finals in 2012.

In 2014, the club made its first appearance in the premier competition's Jubilee Cup Final, facing local rivals Hutt Old Boys-Marist. The club was defeated in the final, 11–14.

== Season records ==
The club has also enjoyed success with its second and third teams. The second side were promoted out of the Senior 2 competition in 2011 and retained their place in Senior 1 after the second round. In 2012, the second side qualified for the Hardham Cup as one of the top four eligible sides, finishing seventh. The third side won the Senior 3 competition in 2012 and, being eligible for promotion, competed in the Senior 3 competition in 2013.

== Facilities ==
The club is based at William Jones Park, which has an indoor training facility and a single field. Matches are also played at Mary Crowther Park, a short distance away.

The club also fields Colts (U21), Under 85kg restricted and Presidents grade (over 35s) sides at a senior level, as well as a number of junior sides. The club maintains close links with Wainuiomata High School, providing a pathway into senior rugby.

== Notable players ==
Piri Weepu and Jonah Lomu are the club's two All Blacks alumni, with Weepu regularly playing for the club when circumstances allowed him to do so. Jonah Lomu played for the club twice in 2000 and 2001 and also represented the club when donning its club socks when appearing for Barbarian F.C in 2000.

Justin Va'a and Earl Va'a represented Manu Samoa including appearances at two Rugby World Cup tournaments. Uale Mai was a stalwart for the Samoa national rugby sevens team and was named IRB International Sevens Player of the Year in 2006.
