= Taele =

Taele is a surname. Notable people with the surname include:

- Pelu Taele (born 1981), New Zealand-born Samoan and Niue international rugby union footballer
- Xavi Taele (born 2004), New Zealand rugby union player
