= Taylor Mokate =

US international rugby union player

- Born: March 4, 1988 (age 38) Dallas, Texas, U.S.
- Height: 1.95 m (6 ft 5 in)
- Weight: 106.8 kg (16 st 11 lb)
- University: University of Oklahoma
- Occupation: Professional Rugby Union Player

Rugby union career
- Position(s): Number 8, Flanker
Amateur team(s)
Years	Team	Apps	(Points)
2012	Old Boys University		
International career
Years	Team	Apps	(Points)
2012-present	USA	3	(5 1t)
National sevens team
Years	Team		Comps
2011-2012	USA 7s		
- Correct as of July 18, 2012

Taylor Mokate is an American professional rugby player who was formerly contracted to play for the USA Sevens during 2012.

Originally recruited as a tight end to play at the University of Oklahoma, Mokate ended playing on the rugby team. Mokate signed to play for Old Boys University an amateur club based in New Zealand to compete for The Jubilee Cup during the 2012 season.

On June 9, 2012 Mokate earned his first cap for the USA in a 25-28 loss to Canada. Mokate scored his first international try in a victory against Georgia. In July 2012 Mokate signed a contract to play professionally for the USA Sevens, but that contract was not renewed for 2013.
