= Tyler Ardron =

Canada international rugby union player

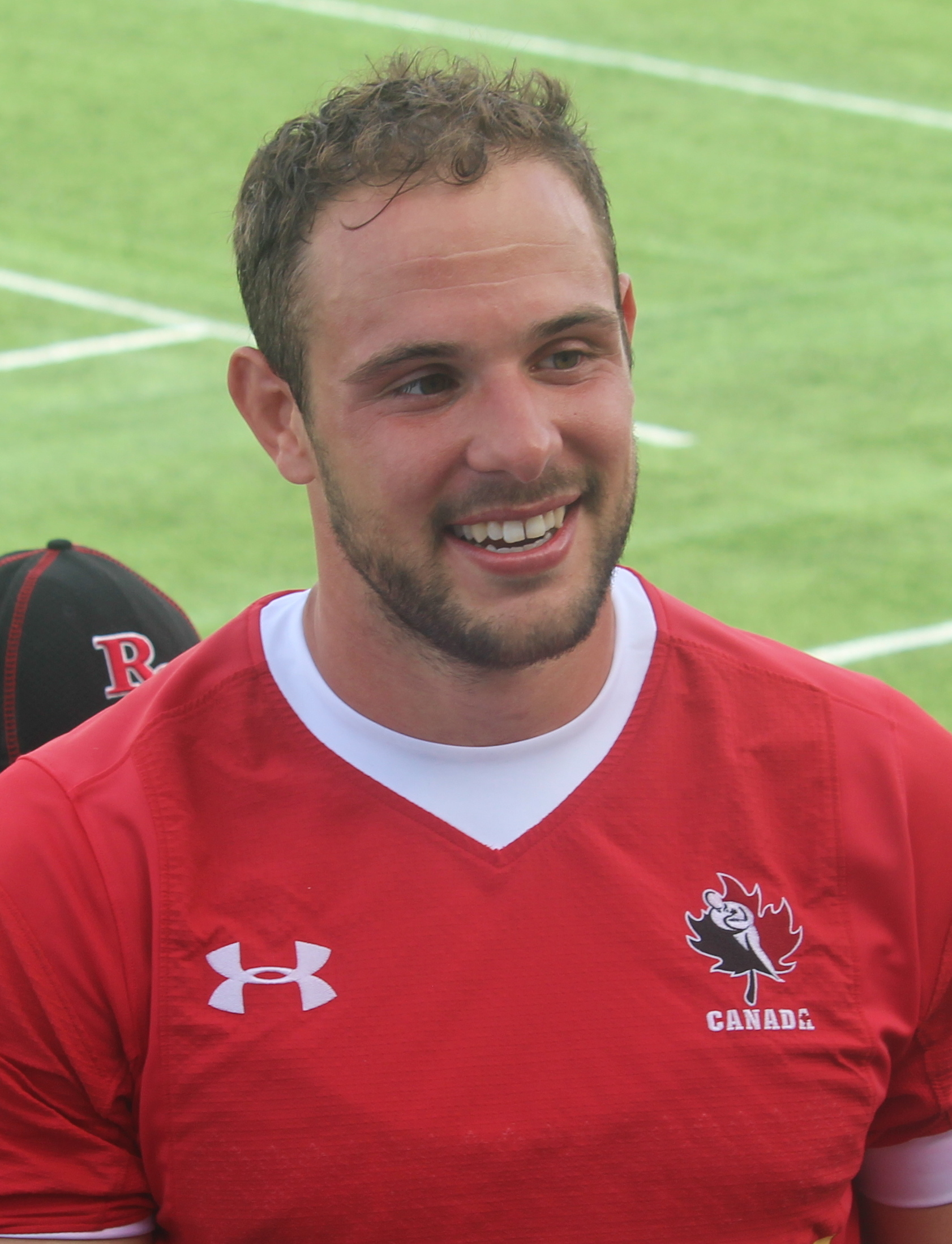
- Ardron with Canada, June 2017
- Full name: Tyler James Ardron
- Born: 16 June 1991 (age 35) Peterborough, Ontario, Canada
- Height: 6 ft 4 in (193 cm)
- Weight: 243 lb (110 kg; 17 st 5 lb)
- School: Kawartha Pine Ridge District School

Rugby union career
- Position(s): Lock, Number 8
- Current team: Castres
Senior career
Years	Team	Apps	(Points)
2013–2017	Ospreys	64	(35)
2017–2018	Bay of Plenty	15	(10)
2018–2020	Chiefs	30	(25)
2020–	Castres	45	(25)
- Correct as of 26 February 2022
International career
Years	Team	Apps	(Points)
2010–2011	Canada U20	6	(15)
2012–	Canada	40	(25)
2019	Barbarian F.C.	3	(0)
- Correct as of 20 March 2022
National sevens team
Years	Team		Comps
2012–2013	Canada		8
- Correct as of 20 June 2020

Tyler Ardron (born 16 June 1991) is a Canadian rugby union player who plays for Canada nationally and Castres in the Top 14. Ardron plays in the back-row but is also capable of providing cover in the second row.

== Club career ==
Ardron joined the Ospreys for the 2013-2014 RaboDirect Pro12 season. Ardron made his first appearance for the Ospreys on 14 September 2013. Coming off the bench, Ardron played for 26 minutes against Leinster.

Ardron signed for the Chiefs in Super Rugby for 2018 and Bay of Plenty in the Mitre 10 Cup for 2017.

Ardron made the switch to Castres Olympique in the French TOP 14 for the 2022–21 season.

== International career ==
Ardron made his debut for the Canada national rugby union team against the United States during the 2012 Summer Internationals and captained the team from 2013, notably at the World Cup in 2015 and 2019.

On August 22, 2025, Ardron was the key player in Canada’s 34-20 defeat of 16th-ranked United States in front of 11,587 fans at McMahon Stadium in Calgary, Alberta, Canada. The game was in the opening round of the 2025 Pacific Nations Cup, which is a qualifying tournament for the 2027 Men’s Rugby World Cup. In his first test match since 2021, Ardron, playing #8, scored four tries to equal a Canadian single-test record that has stood since 2000. The victory gave 25th-ranked Canada their first win over their long-time rivals since 2021.
