= Peter Palmer (rugby union) =

- Notable relative: Dan Palmer (son)

Rugby union career
- Position: Hooker
Provincial / State sides
| Years | Team | Apps | (Points) |
| 1982–92 | New South Wales | 35 | (8) |

Peter Palmer is an Australian former rugby union player.

Palmer is the son of NSW Country second-rower Harold "Hadja" Palmer.

A hooker, Palmer was a product of Illawarra rugby and represented Australia under-18s. He featured regularly in the New South Wales state side from 1982 to 1992 and was a reserve for Australia's 1991 Rugby World Cup squad.

Palmer is the father of former Wallabies prop Dan Palmer.
