= Nick Civetta =

American rugby union player (born 1989)

- Born: November 5, 1989 (age 37) Scarsdale, New York, U.S.
- Height: 6 ft 8 in (2.03 m)
- Weight: 118 kg (18 st 8 lb; 260 lb)
- University: University of Notre Dame; University of California, Berkeley; University of Oxford

Rugby union career
- Position: Lock
Amateur team(s)
Years	Team	Apps	(Points)
2012	SFGG		
2013	New York Athletic Club RFC		
2021–2022	Oxford University RFC		
- Correct as of May 12, 2014
Senior career
Years	Team	Apps	(Points)
2013–2014	Lazio	19	(10)
2014–2015	Rugby Viadana	9	(0)
2015–2016	I Medicei	20	(45)
2016–2018	Newcastle Falcons	5	(0)
2017–2018	→ Doncaster Knights (loan)	12	(0)
2018–2019	Doncaster Knights	15	(15)
2019–2020	Vannes	15	(0)
2021–2022	Rugby United New York	18	(5)
- Correct as of 21 November 2022
International career
Years	Team	Apps	(Points)
2012	USA Selects	3	(0)
2016–2022	United States	35	(20)
- Correct as of 21 November 2022

Nick Civetta (born November 5, 1989) is an American former professional rugby player who last played for Rugby New York of Major League Rugby. He also played internationally for the United States rugby team. He played as a second row.

He previously played for RC Vannes in the Rugby Pro D2.

== University rugby ==
Civetta was born in White Plains, New York. Civetta's rugby career began at 18 when he began playing for the University of Notre Dame Rugby Football Club. He was named an All-American in his junior and senior years. Civetta graduated with a B.S in Civil Engineering from the University of Notre Dame, and a M.S. in Geotechnical Engineering from the University of California, Berkeley. Civetta finished an M.S. at the University of Oxford in 2022. He played in the 2022 Varsity Match, earning a winning blue.

== Club career ==
Civetta moved to Berkeley, CA and played for San Francisco Golden Gate RFC in the Rugby Super League in 2012. In 2013, he played with New York Athletic Club in the newly formed US Elite Cup.

In the summer of 2013, Civetta signed a contract with Rome-based Lazio playing in the National Championship of Excellence competition. After the 2013–2014 season, Civetta signed with Parma based Rugby Viadana.

On 6 May 2016, Civetta signed for England top-flight club Newcastle Falcons in the Aviva Premiership from the 2016-17 season. Civetta made his debut for Newcastle playing 58 minutes in a loss to Ospreys in the European Challenge Cup.

After spending the next season on loan with the Doncaster Knights, that he permanently joined for the 2018-19 season.

After the world cup, Civetta joined RC Vannes on a medical joker contract. He played 15 matches before the season was cut short due to the COVID-19 pandemic.

Civetta signed with Rugby United New York for the 2021 Major League Rugby season. In April 2022 he scored a try for Oxford University in their 21–17 victory over Cambridge in the 140th Varsity Match while appearing alongside fellow American internationals, Eric Fry and Andrew Durutalo.

== International career ==
In 2012, Civetta was selected to the USA Selects that played in the 2012 Americas Rugby Championship. He appeared in all three games against Argentina, Canada, and Uruguay, starting two of them.

In November 2016, Civetta made his senior USA debut against New Zealand Maori and his test debut against Romania. His second cap came the following week in a 20-17 loss against Tonga.

Civetta was selected for the USA 2019 Rugby World Cup squad. He was named a starter in three pool matches against England, France, and Tonga. In March 2023 he confirmed his retirement from professional rugby.
