= Dan Palmer (rugby union) =

Australia international rugby union player

- Born: Daniel Palmer; 13 September 1988 (age 38) Shellharbour, Australia
- Height: 1.8 m (5 ft 11 in)
- Weight: 115 kg (18 st 2 lb)
- Notable relative: Peter Palmer (father)

Rugby union career
- Position: Prop
Senior career
Years	Team	Apps	(Points)
2007	Melbourne Rebels	2	(0)
2008–2013	Southern Districts	50	(0)
2008–2010	Waratahs	14	(0)
2011–2013	Brumbies	31	(0)
2013	Grenoble	0	(0)
2015	Brumbies	1	(0)
International career
Years	Team	Apps	(Points)
2006	Australian Schoolboys		
2007	Australia U19		
2008	Australia U20		
2012	Australia	1	(0)
Coaching career
- Years: Team
- 2015–2018: ACT Brumbies (set piece)
- 2019: Suntory Sungoliath (assistant)
- 2020–2023: ACT Brumbies (scrum)
- 2023: Australia (lineout)
- 2023–2024: Leicester Tigers (scrum)

Dan Palmer (born 13 September 1988) is an Australian rugby union coach and retired professional player. He was the lineout coach for the Australia national team at the 2023 Rugby World Cup and most recently was the Leicester Tigers scrum coach. He played for the New South Wales Waratahs and ACT Brumbies in Super Rugby, before a short stint with French club Grenoble. He also earned one cap for Australia in 2012. His usual position was tighthead prop.

== Early life ==
Palmer was born in Shellharbour, New South Wales. He played junior rugby with Kiama and attended Warilla High School. He represented Australia at Schoolboy, Under-19 and Under-20 levels. He played his senior club rugby in Sydney for Southern Districts in the Shute Shield.

== Rugby career ==
In 2007, Palmer played for the Melbourne Rebels in the Australian Rugby Championship. He joined the New South Wales Waratahs squad in 2008 and was signed to a three-year deal after making his debut against the Highlanders in round three of the Super 14 competition. In 2011 he was looking for more playing time and moved to ACT to play for the Brumbies, where he became their starting tighthead prop.

Palmer was capped as the starting tighthead prop for Australia against Scotland in Newcastle on 5 June 2012. In January 2013, Palmer signed to play for FC Grenoble from the 2013–14 season.

However, he never played a match for Grenoble due to a persistent foot injury and subsequently announced his retirement from rugby union at the end of 2014. He returned to Australia to combine university studies with a scrum coaching role at the ACT Brumbies. Despite a drop in weight to below 16 stone, Palmer returned to the playing roster at the Brumbies as a short-term appointment at prop for team's tour to South Africa during the 2015 Super Rugby season.

== Coaching ==
Palmer became involved with coaching the Brumbies upon his retirement, he has also coached Australia 'A' and Suntory Sungoliath. He will coach Australia's lineout at the 2023 Rugby World Cup then take up a position as Leicester Tigers scrum coach. In June 2024 Palmer resigned his position at Leicester following Dan McKellar who left earlier in the week.

== Other ==
After rugby, Palmer returned to study and completed a double degree in science and psychology at the Australian National University. As of 2026, Palmer is in the last stages of his PhD in cellular neuroscience.

He is the first openly gay Wallabies player.
