= Benjamin Lapeyre =

French rugby union player

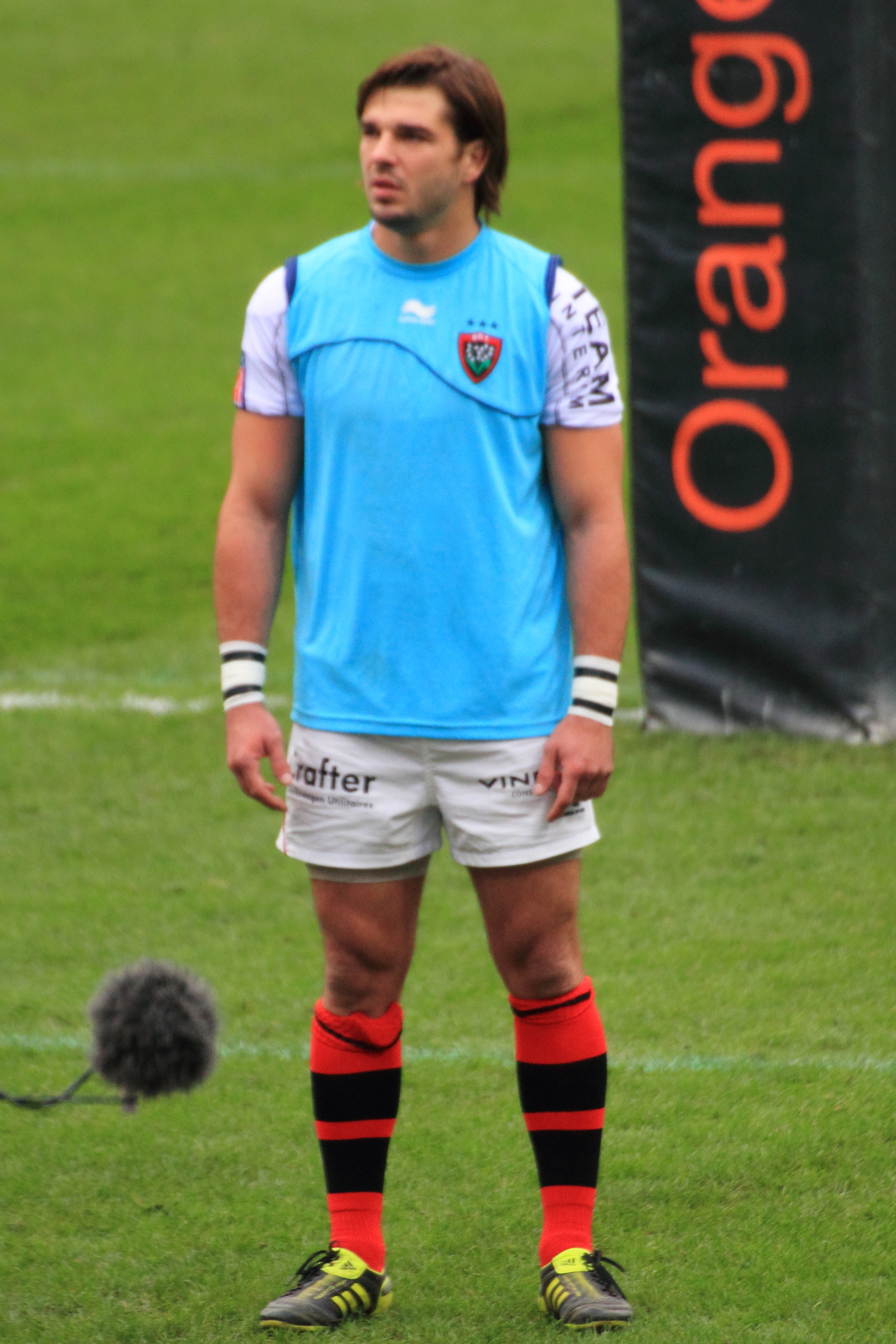
- Born: Benjamin Lapeyre; 24 September 1986 (age 40) Castres, France
- Height: 1.81 m (5 ft 11 1/2 in)
- Weight: 87 kg (13 st 10 lb)

Rugby union career
- Position(s): Fullback, Wing
- Current team: Brive
Senior career
Years	Team	Apps	(Points)
2007–2008	Castres	1	(0)
2008–2010	Albi	62	(116)
2010–2013	Toulon	63	(95)
2013–2015	Racing	31	(26)
2015–2016	La Rochelle	15	(25)
2016–	Brive	33	(62)
- Correct as of 20 November 2016

Benjamin Lapeyre (born 24 September 1986 in Castres) is a French rugby union player. His position is Fullback, although he can also play as a Wing. He currently plays for CA Brive in the French Top 14.
