= Aretz Iguiniz =

French rugby union player

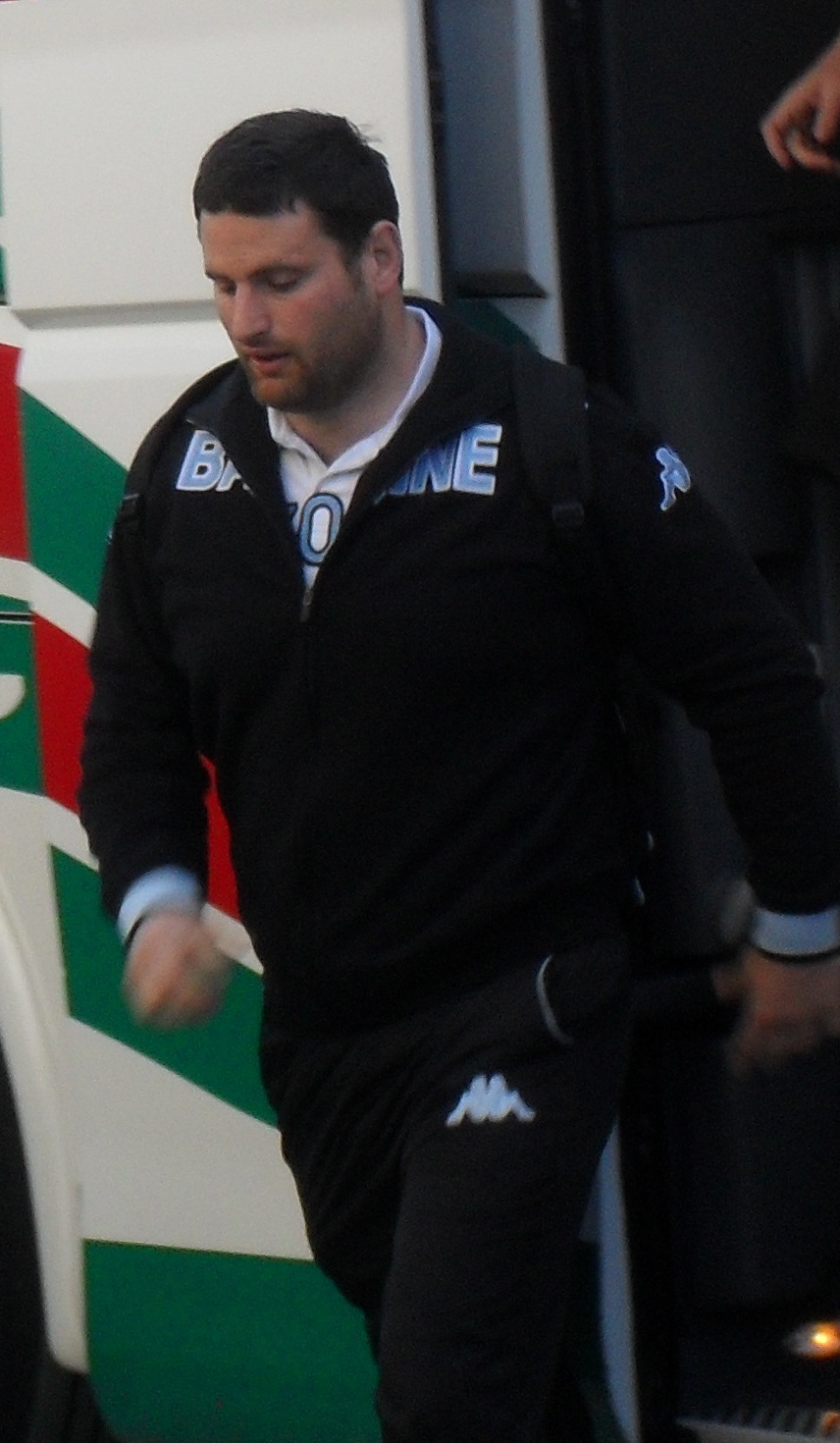
- Born: 3 June 1983 (age 43)
- Height: 1.88 m (6 ft 2 in)
- Weight: 114 kg (17 st 13 lb)

Rugby union career
- Position: Prop
Senior career
Years	Team	Apps	(Points)
2005–2020	Bayonne	373	(25)

Aretz Iguiniz (born 3 June 1983) is a former French rugby union player. His position was Prop and he played his entire career for Aviron Bayonnais in the Top 14.
