= Thierry Lacrampe =

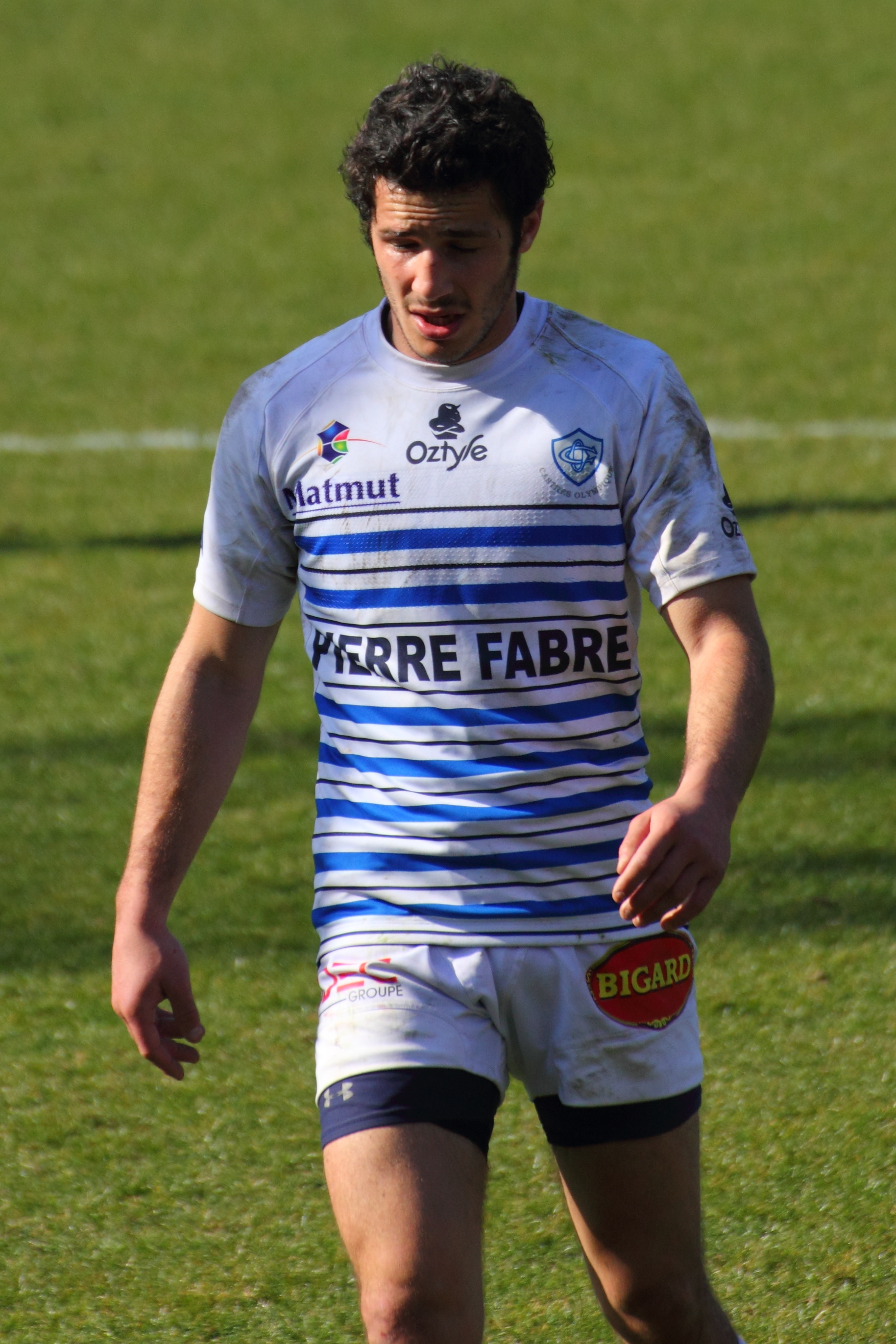
- Born: 23 February 1988 (age 38) Lourdes, France
- Height: 1.77 m (5 ft 9 1/2 in)
- Weight: 78 kg (12 st 4 lb)

Rugby union career
- Position: Scrum-half
Senior career
| Years | Team | Apps | (Points) |
| 2006–2011 | Tarbes | 102 | (56) |
| 2011–2013 | Castres | 32 | (17) |
| 2013-15 | Clermont | 35 | (34) |
| 2015-17 | Section Paloise | 18 | (5) |
- Correct as of 19 December 2019

Thierry Lacrampe (born 23 February 1988) is a French rugby union player. His position is Scrum-half and he formerly played for Section Paloise in the Top 14. He began his career with Tarbes in the Pro D2 before moving to Castres in 2011.
