= Tolifili Liufau =

US international rugby union player (born 1984)

- Full name: Tolifili Hefakala Andre Liufau
- Born: August 13, 1984 (age 42) Waikiki, Hawaii, U.S.
- Height: 6 ft 2 in (188 cm)
- Weight: 300 lb (136 kg)
- School: Saint Louis School
- University: Fresno City College; University of Utah
- Notable relative: Stan Mataele (uncle)

Rugby union career
- Position: Prop
International career
Years	Team	Apps	(Points)
2012	United States	2	(0)

Tolifili Hefakala Andre Liufau (born August 13, 1984) is an American former rugby union international.

Liufau, educated at Saint Louis School in Honolulu, is a nephew of former NFL player Stan Mataele.

Originally a gridiron football player, Liufau was a defensive lineman and had two years playing college football at Fresno City College, before transferring to the University of Utah. He played in the Arena Football League for the Rio Grande Valley Dorados and Arizona Rattlers after his collegiate career. A rugby union prop, Liufau got started in the sport with the Los Angeles club in 2010 and spent the 2011/12 season in France with USO Nevers, competing in the Fédérale 1 competition. He made two capped appearances for the United States in 2012, against Georgia and Italy.

== See also ==
- List of United States national rugby union players
