= Pierrick Gunther =

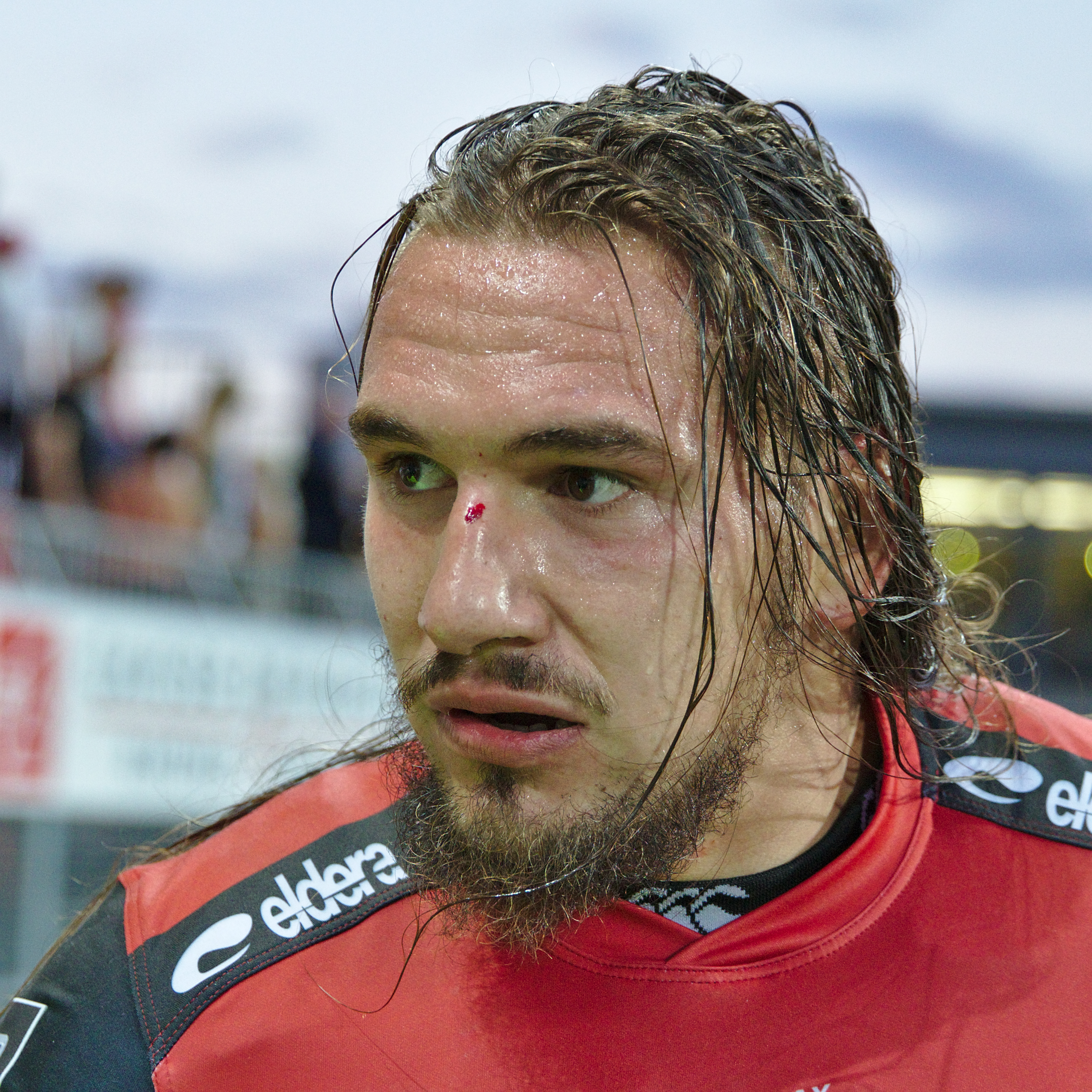
- Born: 4 June 1989 (age 37) Roubaix, France
- Height: 1.90 m (6 ft 3 in)
- Weight: 106 kg (16 st 10 lb)

Rugby union career
- Position: Flanker
Senior career
| Years | Team | Apps | (Points) |
| 2007–14 | RC Toulon | 70 | (30) |
| 2014-15 | Lyon OU | 4 | (0) |
| 2015-16 | Oyonnax Rugby | 22 | (5) |
| 2016- | Section Paloise | 75 | (30) |
- Correct as of 19 December 2019
International career
| Years | Team | Apps | (Points) |
| 2012– | France | 1 | (0) |
- Correct as of 5 November 2012

Pierrick Gunther (born 16 October 1989) is a French rugby union player. His position is Flanker and he plays for the Top 14 team Section Paloise.
