= James Paterson (rugby union) =

US international rugby union player

- Born: James Douglas Paterson; 11 April 1987 (age 39) Christchurch, New Zealand
- Height: 1.85 m (6 ft 1 in)
- Weight: 98 kg (216 lb)
- School: Christchurch Boys' High School

Rugby union career
- Position: Wing
Amateur team(s)
Years	Team	Apps	(Points)
2012–	Glendale Raptors		
Provincial / State sides
Years	Team	Apps	(Points)
2008–2009	Canterbury	19	(50)
2010–2011	Southland	7	(0)
Super Rugby
Years	Team	Apps	(Points)
2010–2011	Highlanders	21	(10)
International career
Years	Team	Apps	(Points)
2011–2012	United States	12	(15)
- Correct as of 31 January 2014

James Douglas Paterson born in Christchurch, New Zealand) is a former rugby union player with dual United States and New Zealand citizenship (born in New Zealand, mother is American). Paterson played Super Rugby for the Highlanders between 2010 and 2011. Paterson played for the United States at the 2011 Rugby World Cup.

== Youth ==
Paterson's first introduction to rugby was in 1999 after returning from 8 years living in Budapest, Hungary where his father developed and directed an Agricultural Trading and Consultancy business. He returned to Christchurch, his home town and enrolled in Medbury Intermediate School where he played for the First XV. He then enrolled at Christchurch Boys' High School where he went on to play for the First XV in his 5th form (now known as Year 11).

After four years he was on the move again to Colorado, USA where he ended up playing high school football. Paterson impressed in a short period of time, achieving Colorado State recognition for the most running yards in a season as a Wide Receiver & Running Back. In the off season for football and prior to High School graduation from Pine Creek High School, Colorado Springs he along with his father, John, helped develop the Colorado Springs High School Rugby Club winning State in 2005. This team is now a frequent winner of the Colorado State High School State Championships.

In 2005 Paterson was selected for the USA U19 National Rugby team where he played in the U19 Rugby World Cup in South Africa, and the following year Captained the USA team at the U19 Rugby World Cup in Dubai.

== Career ==
Paterson accepted a contract to the Canterbury Rugby Union – Crusaders in 2006 combined with a scholarship to the University of Lincoln College. He moved to Christchurch as a Crusaders wider training group team member. In 2007 he was selected for the New Zealand U21 team but suffered a minor knee injury so was unable to tour. Paterson played for the Canterbury NPC team for two seasons 2008 (one of the leading NPC try scorers) and 2009 collecting two NPC Championship titles. In 2009 he was named "One of five NZ's most promising players" in the 75th Jubilee of the NZ Rugby Almanack.

In 2010 Paterson accepted a contract to Super Rugby with the Highlanders. As part of the move south he also signed up with the Southland Stags in the newly named ITM rugby competition (Formally NPC). He spent two seasons with Southland and the Highlanders.

In 2012 Paterson decided to join his family international business based in Colorado Springs, Colorado, USA. When time permits he plays rugby for Glendale Raptors and for the Eagles. He underwent knee surgery for the second time in 2013 ruling him out of all Eagles assemblies until 2014.

== Education ==
Primary schools

- Greater Grace School of Budapest, Hungary
- Medbury Intermediate School, Christchurch, New Zealand

Secondary schools

- Christchurch Boys' High School
- Pine Creek High School, Colorado Springs, Colorado, USA (2005 Graduate)

Universities

- Colorado School of Mines, Golden, Colorado, USA
- Lincoln College (2010 graduate in BA Commerce & Management)
