= Derek Asbun =

US international rugby union player

- Born: September 16, 1988 (age 38) Bakersfield, CA, United States
- Height: 6 ft 0 in (183 cm)
- Weight: 214 lb (97 kg)

Rugby union career
- Position: Flanker / Hooker
International career
Years	Team	Apps	(Points)
2012–13	United States	7	(0)

Derek Asbun (born September 16, 1988) is an American former rugby union international.

== Family and early life ==
Asbun was born in Bakersfield, California and grew up in the Bay Area (San Ramon valley) close to Walnut Creek and Danville. He attended De La Salle High School. His father is Dr. Horacio Asbun, an oncology surgeon born in La Paz, Bolivia and educated in Chile and Spain, as well as the United States. His brother is Dr. Domenech Asbun, a hepatobiliary and pancreas surgeon at Miami Cancer Institute. His grandfather was Dr. Juan Asbun, a general surgeon from La Paz, Bolivia.

== Rugby career ==
A forward, Asbun was primarily a flanker and played collegiate rugby with UC Berkeley, where he was team captain and twice earned All-American honors.

Asbun continued his studies at Oxford University and was the varsity team's 2012 "player of the year".

Asbun played for the United States Eagles (national team) in 2012 and 2013, gaining seven caps.

== Business career ==
After his rugby career, Asbun pursued a career in business. As of 2026, Asbun is Head of Portfolio Development at Salesforce Ventures. His position prior to Salesforce Ventures was Senior Director of Business Development at Sapphire Ventures.

== Bolivian family ==
The Asbun family (sometimes transcribed as Hazboun or Hasbun in Bolivia) is of Palestinian Christian origin from the town of Bethlehem, with a documented genealogy that reaches back to the late 16th century. They were among the first Palestinian families to settle in Bolivia, arriving in Cochabamba at the beginning of the 20th century. Prior to that, they had been in Chile for one generation.

Derek Asbun's grandfather was Dr. Juan Asbun Zugbi, who was born in Cochabamba, Bolivia, studied medicine in Santiago, Chile, where he met his wife Odette Yacir Karmy, and pursued his professional career in La Paz, Bolivia. His father is Dr. Horacio Asbun Yacir. His uncle is Sergio Asbun Yacir, who is a former president of the professional association football (soccer) club The Strongest. Sergio Mauricio Asbun Saba, the CEO of Banco Económico, is a second cousin of Horacio Asbun Yacir.

The sister of Derek Asbun's father, Patricia Maria Asbun-Yacir, a 1970 graduate of the University of Paris, spent her adult life in her husband's country Costa Rica; she was a translator, genealogist and fine artist. She is the subject of a biography

A distant cousin of Juan Asbun Yacir was General Juan Pereda Asbun (1931-2012), a former president of Bolivia.

A distant cousin is Patricia Asbun Galarza, who represented Bolivia as Miss Bolivia in the Miss World 1979 beauty pageant.

Another distant cousin is Rodrigo Hasbun, a Bolivian writer of short stories and novels.

== See also ==
- List of United States national rugby union players
