= Robins Tchale-Watchou =

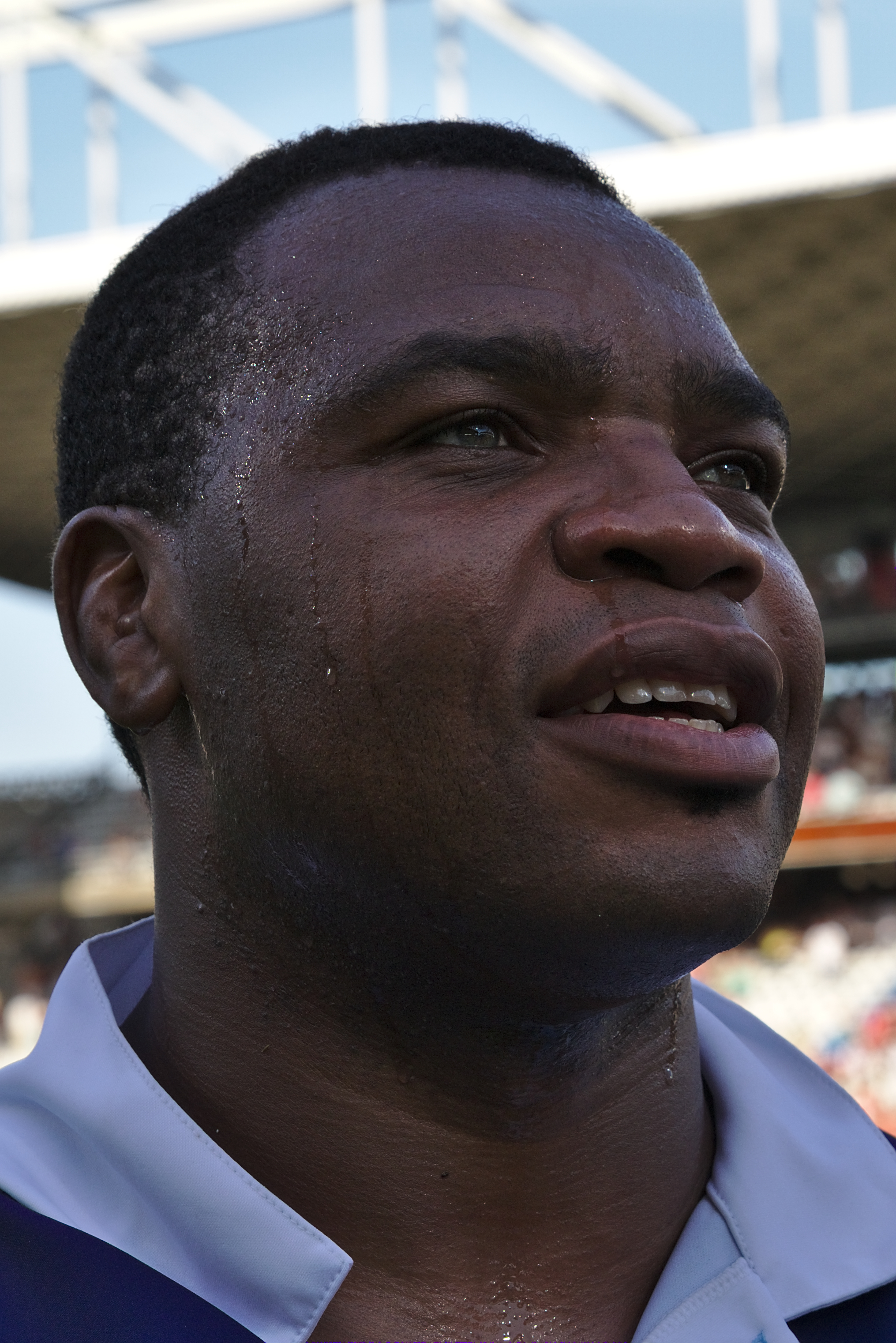
- Born: 10 May 1983 (age 43) Dschang, Cameroon
- Height: 196 cm (6 ft 5 in)
- Weight: 134 kg (21 st 1 lb; 295 lb)
- University: University of Dschang

Rugby union career
- Position(s): Lock, Flanker
Senior career
Years	Team	Apps	(Points)
2005–2006	Aurillac	26	(5)
2006–2007	Gaillac	26	(10)
2007–2008	Auch	18	(0)
2008–2009	Stade Français	9	(0)
2009–2013	Perpignan	104	(10)
2013–2017	Montpellier	92	(15)
- Correct as of 15 September 2017
International career
Years	Team	Apps	(Points)
- Cameroon
- Correct as of 15 September 2017

Robins Tchale-Watchou (born 10 May 1983) is a former Cameroonian rugby union player and the CEO of Vivendi Sports and Chairman of the MMA league ARES.

He played as a lock in France for Stade Français, Perpignan, Montpellier, and the Barbarians.

== Life and career ==
Robins was born in 1983, in the university town of Dschang, Cameroon, the second of eight children. His father was a wood trader and former weightlifter. He was initially a basketball player and took up rugby at the age of sixteen after French rugby player Olivier Vachiet convinced him to swap sports. He made his début for Cameroon in 2002, aged 19.

He received his first professional contract in 2005, with Aurillac in the French Pro D2. In his first season Aurillac were relegated and Robins joined UA Gaillac, who had just been promoted to the D2. Gaillac are also relegated, this time for financial reasons, but Tchale-Watchou impressed and was signed by Top 14 club Auch Gers. Auch were once again relegated.

After Auch's relegation, he was signed by Paris club Stade Français. It was not a successful move for Robins, starting only 3 games all season. He was not offered a new contract by the club. He was signed by USA Perpignan in 2009, establishing himself as a key member of the side that reached the Top 14 final in 2010. He is known by the nicknames Bulldoz, Tchou Tchou and Pikachu.

In February 2018, Robins Tchale-Watchou is appointed CEO of Vivendi Sports, a Vivendi Group company whose aim is to design and organise sports competitions, drawing on the Group's expertise in the sports sector.

Robins is also:

- Chairman of the Professional Union of French Rugby Players
- Chairman of the French Federation of Sports Unions and Associations
- Executive Board Member of French Rugby Federation
- Executive board member of the National Rugby League (France)
- Executive board member of the Rugby World Cup France 2023
- Board Member at the IRPA (international rugby players association)

== Honours ==
- Top 14 Finalist – 2009–10
- Winner of the European Rugby Challenge Cup - 2015-16
