= Andrew Durutalo =

American rugby union player (born 1987)

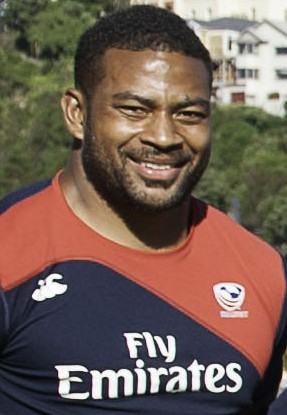
- Durutalo in 2014
- Born: Andrew Mataininotu Van Slyke Mataininotu Durutalo; October 25, 1987 (age 39) New York, New York, United States
- Height: 1.88 m (6 ft 2 in)
- Weight: 245 lb (17 st 7 lb; 111 kg)
- School: Suva Grammar School
- University: Hakuoh University

Rugby union career
- Position: Flanker
Amateur team(s)
Years	Team	Apps	(Points)
2012	OPSB		
2021–2022	Oxford University RFC		
Senior career
Years	Team	Apps	(Points)
2017–2018	Ealing Trailfinders	6	(20)
2017–2018	Worcester Warriors	6	(0)
2018–2020	Ealing Trailfinders	23	(42)
2020–	Seattle Seawolves	9	(5)
- Correct as of 15 April 2022
Super Rugby
Years	Team	Apps	(Points)
2016	Sunwolves	12	(5)
International career
Years	Team	Apps	(Points)
2006	Fiji U20	2	(5)
2012–2018	USA	22	(20)
- Correct as of 16 March 2018
National sevens team
Years	Team		Comps
2011–2017	United States 7s		43
- Correct as of 25 December 2020

Andrew Durutalo (born October 25, 1987) is a Fijian-raised American-born professional rugby player who plays for the Seattle Seawolves of Major League Rugby (MLR). He has been capped by the U.S. national sevens team and the United States national rugby union team.

== Early life ==
Durutalo was born in New York but soon moved to Fiji where he attended Suva Grammar School. He graduated with a degree in Business administration from Hakuoh University in Japan.

== Club career ==
After a successful spell with the USA sevens program, Durutalo signed with the Sunwolves for the 2016 Super Rugby season.

On 16 May 2017, Durutalo signs for English Championship club Ealing Trailfinders based in London ahead of the 2017-18 season. scoring five tries in his first six appearances attracted attention from the English Premiership. He moved up to the English Premiership, on 16 October 2017, signing with Worcester Warriors.

On 16 April 2018, Durutalo will return to Ealing Trailfinders back in the RFU Championship on a long-term deal from the 2018-19 season.

In 2021 he was awarded "Man of the Match" in the 139th Varsity Match. In April 2022 he scored a try for Oxford University in their 21–17 victory over Cambridge in the 140th Varsity Match while appearing alongside fellow American internationals, Eric Fry and Nick Civetta.

After playing eight matches for the Seattle Seawolves in 2021 MLR season, he re-signed with the Seawolves for the 2022 season.

== International career ==
He played at the 2006 Under 19 Rugby World Championship. He also represented Fiji's Under 20s team.

Duratalo was first capped by the United States in 2012 against Canada. Durutalo played for the U.S. at the 2015 Rugby World Cup in England.

Durutalo also played for the U.S. national sevens team at the 2016 Summer Olympics, where the U.S. finished in ninth place, missing the quarterfinal round.
