= Pelu Taele =

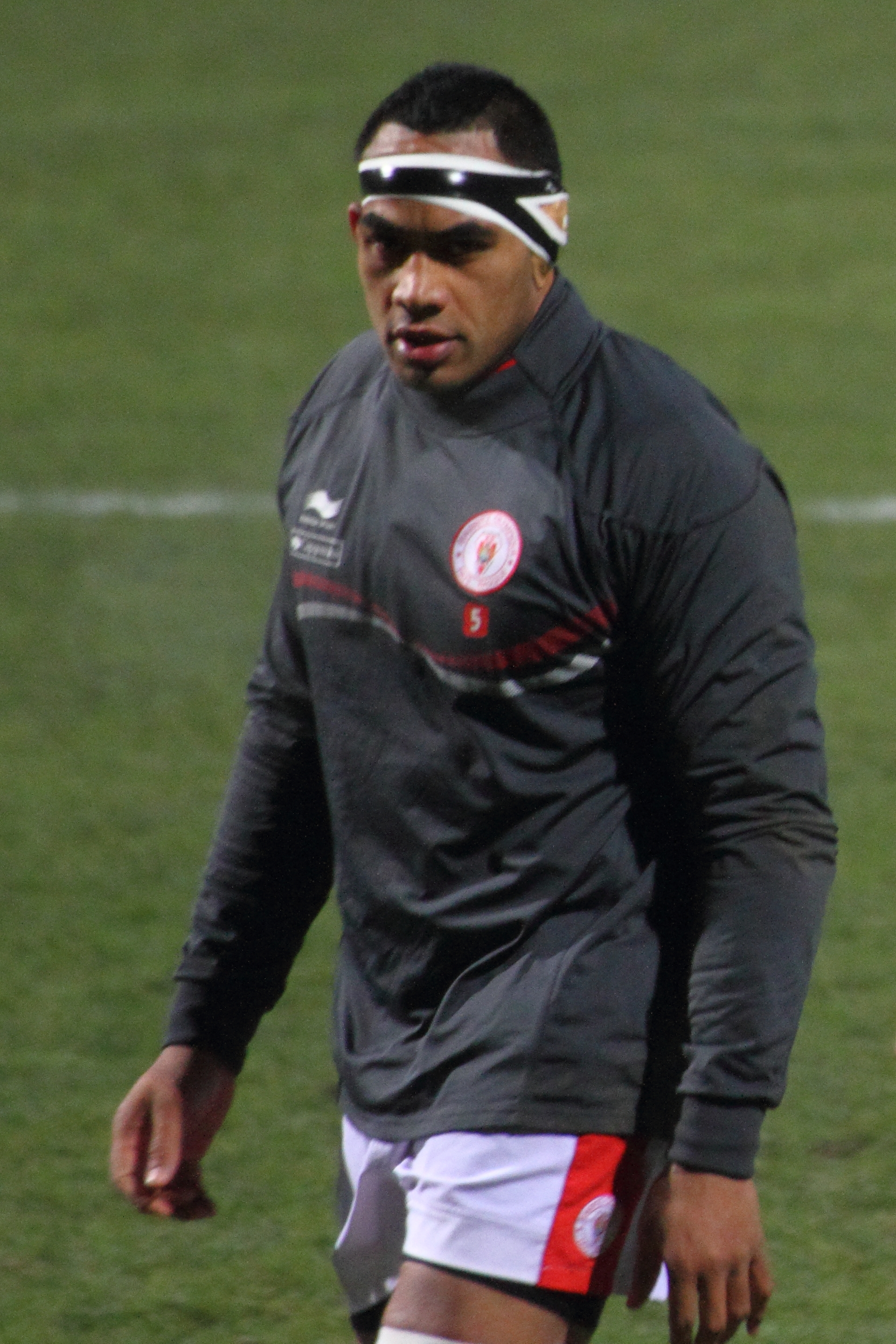
- Born: Pelu Ian Taele-Pavihi; 28 September 1981 (age 45) Dunedin, New Zealand
- Height: 1.98 m (6 ft 6 in)
- Weight: 251 lb (114 kg)

Rugby union career
- Position: Lock
- Current team: Biarritz Olympique
Senior career
Years	Team	Apps	(Points)
2006–2007	Leeds Tykes	12	(5)
2007–2009	Parma	39	(25)
2009–2014	Biarritz	111	(25)
2014-2017	Bayonne	46	(5)
2017-	RC Narbonne	14	(0)
- Correct as of 30 January 2015
Provincial / State sides
Years	Team	Apps	(Points)
2004–2006	Otago	2	(0)
International career
Years	Team	Apps	(Points)
2005–2010	Samoa	11	(0)

Pelu Ian Taele-Pavihi (born 28 September 1981, in Dunedin), also known as Pelu Taele, is a New Zealand-born Samoan and Niue international rugby union footballer. He is a 1.98 metres (6 ft 6 in) second row forward who joined Biarritz Olympique before the 2009–10 season.

== Club career ==
Taele played for the Highlanders development squad in 2004 and represented Otago in the National Provincial Championship. He signed for Saracens in July 2006, with the intention of joining up with the squad after completing the New Zealand season with Otago. By the time he arrived in England, there was too much competition for his position at Saracens so he was loaned to Leeds Tykes. Taele then spent two seasons with Overmach Parma, where he was part of the team that won the Coppa Italia in both 2008 and 2009. Before the 2009–10 season Taele moved to Biarritz Olympique. In 2014 he signed a two-year deal with Aviron Bayonnais.

== International career ==
Taele gained selection for the Samoan national side by virtue of his performances with Otago. He made his international debut against Tonga in July 2005 and was in the starting XV against England later the same year. He featured in the 2006 IRB Pacific 5 Nations squad with tests against the Junior All Blacks, Fiji, Tonga and Japan, and (as of November 2011) has eight caps in total.
