= Old Boys University =

New Zealand rugby union club

Old Boys University are a New Zealand rugby union club, who were the 2015 winners of the Wellington Rugby Football Union's premier club rugby grade, the Jubilee Cup. They were the first holders of the Hardham Cup in 1939 and won it most recently in 2009. The club's predecessor team, Victoria University Club, were the first winners of The Jubilee Cup in 1929.

== History ==
The team is an amalgamation of the Wellington College Old Boys' club and the Victoria University of Wellington rugby union club. They are commonly referred to as OBU. The team's jerseys are bottle green and white hoops with a black patch and gold numbers, reflecting the colours of the two teams who merged to form the club. OBU's alternate strip is a black jersey with a harlequin front panel consisting of the four colours of the two clubs: black and white from WCOB, and green and yellow from VUWRFC.

== Players ==
Although the club is amateur, many professional players have been in the team. Many OBU players have gone on to national and international level. Notable players include:

- Wes Goosen from Wellington College
- New Zealand representative Conrad Smith
- Michael Hobbs
- Lima Sopoaga
- Tomasi Palu
- Black Fern Claire Rowat
- 1921 All Black captain George Aitken
- Stu Wilson.
