= Hutt Old Boys-Marist =

New Zealand rugby football club

- Full name: Hutt Old Boys-Marist RFC
- Founded: 1992; 33 years ago
- Ground: Hutt Recreation Ground
- League: Jubilee Cup Premier
- 2014: 1st

Official website
- hobm.co.nz

Hutt Old Boys-Marist (HOBM) is a New Zealand rugby football club. Playing in the competitions of the Wellington Rugby Football Union, it is based at the Hutt Recreation Ground in Lower Hutt.

Hutt Old Boys-Marist is a product of mergers over many years between former clubs, including Hutt (founded 1910), Hutt Valley High School Old Boys (1953) and Hutt Valley Marist (1949). The clubs merged in 1992, and played their first season in 1993, as Hutt Old Boys Marist, making the Hutt Recreation their home ground, and club rooms, while Hutt Valley Marist abandoned its club rooms located at Fraser park in Taita. The club celebrated its centennial in 2010, marking 100 years since the formation of the Hutt Rugby Club from earlier clubs Woburn and Kia Ora.

The Hutt Old Boys Club founded in 1967 played for many years in a gold jersey with green shorts and gold and green socks, but returned in the 1990s to the red and white of the previous Hutt club before adding green on amalgamation with Hutt Valley Marist. Hutt Valley Marist's strip was green, white, and maroon.

HOBM has won Wellington's premier rugby trophy, the Jubilee Cup, several times. Hutt won in 1931 and 1934, Hutt OB in 1991, and HOBM in 2007, 2014 and 2025. Hutt OB also won the Swindale Shield, for the first-round competition in 1989 in their first year after being promoted, also claiming it in 1997, 2012 and 2015.

HOBM has produced, or been the home club for, a number of All Blacks. Colin Loader represented the All Black in 1953–54, while former All Blacks Steven Pokere, Hika Reid and Mark Shaw played for the club in the late 1980s and early 1990s. Also Bernie Fraser represented the All Blacks, and Wellington, and also played for Hutt Valley Marist in the 70s and 80s. More recent All Blacks affiliated to HOBM include Piri Weepu, Hosea Gear and Jeremy Thrush.
