= The Jubilee Cup =

Rugby union trophy in New Zealand

The Jubilee Cup is a rugby trophy. It is the premier club competition trophy of the Wellington Rugby Football Union, and the current holders are Petone, following their defeat of HOBM in the 2026 final.

== Origins and history ==
The Jubilee Cup was first presented for competition in 1929 by the WRFU, honouring the union's 50th Jubilee. The first winners were the Victoria University club, defending the title they won in 1928.

Petone are the club with the most Jubilee Cup successes, winning the trophy 22 times, including five consecutive wins from 1967 to 1971. Two of these titles were shared, with St Pat's Old Boys in 1949 and Wellington in 1982.

The next most successful club is Marist St Pats (14 titles since formation in 1971) who can also claim another 6 titles from its predecessor clubs Marist Brothers Old Boys (3 outright, 2 shared) and St Pat's Old Boys (1 shared). Other clubs with five or more titles are Athletic (7 outright, 1 shared), Victoria University (7 outright, 1 shared), Wellington (five outright, two shared), and Poneke (five outright plus another two in amalgamation with Oriental during World War II).

By contrast Oriental-Rongotai's 2011 victory was their first outright Wellington title since 1910. Old Boys-University's 2015 success was their first since their 1991 merger, and first for the merger identity since University's last win in 1966.

== Recent history ==
Between 1993 and 1996 the trophy was rebranded as the Lion Brown Trophy for sponsorship purposes. This also coincided with the introduction of the current finals format. Since then the trophy has been won by Marist St Pats (7), Petone (3), Norths (3) Poneke (2), Hutt Old Boys-Marist (2), Tawa (2), Oriental-Rongotai (2), Western Suburbs (1), and Old Boys-University (1). Norths and Marist St Pats also shared the 2008 title after the final finished 10-all and the competition rules did not allow for extra-time to be played, a situation which has since been rectified.

== Competition format ==
Currently the Jubilee Cup round is the second round of the Wellington competition. The fourteen teams in the Premier competition firstly play the round-robin Swindale Shield competition over 13 rounds, with the top 8 teams moving onto the Jubilee Cup round (the bottom 6 teams are joined by the top 2 eligible teams from the Premier Reserve competition to contest the Hardham Cup). The Jubilee Cup is also contested in a round-robin format, this time over seven rounds, with the top 4 teams progressing to the semi-finals where the top team (since 2009 awarded the Andy Leslie Trophy) hosts the fourth-placed qualifier and second hosts third. The final is then held at usually a neutral venue. Athletic Park hosted the final up to the 1999 decider, since then Westpac Stadium has been the main venue, though recent finals have been held at the Petone Recreation Ground, Hutt Recreation Ground, and Porirua Park.

== Wellington Club Championship titles won (Jubilee Cup from 1929 and pre-Jubilee Cup) ==
Wellington club rugby championship winners
Club(s)	Year
Petone	2026
Hutt Old Boys Marist	2025
OBU	2024
Oriental-Rongotai	2023
Northern United	2022
Tawa	2021
Old Boys University	2020
Northern United	2019
Old Boys University	2018
Old Boys University	2017
Tawa	2016
Old Boys University	2015
Hutt Old Boys Marist	2014
Tawa	2013
Marist St Pat's	2012
Oriental-Rongotai	2011
Northern United	2010
Marist St Pat's	2009
Marist St Pat's/Northern United	2008
Hutt Old Boys Marist	2007
Northern United	2006
Petone	2005
Northern United	2004
Poneke	2003
Marist St Pat's	2002
Marist St Pat's	2001
Petone	2000
Marist St Pat's	1999
Western Suburbs	1998
Marist St Pat's	1997
Poneke	1996
Marist St Pat's	1995
Marist St Pat's	1994
Petone	1993
Petone	1992
Hutt Old Boys	1991
Petone	1990
Petone	1989
Marist St Pat's	1988
Wellington	1987
Petone	1986
Wellington	1985
Marist St Pat's	1984
Wellington	1983
Wellington/Petone	1982
Marist St Pat's	1981
Petone	1980
Marist St Pat's	1979
Marist St Pat's/Wellington	1978
Athletic	1977
Petone	1976
Poneke	1975
Petone	1974
Petone	1973
Wellington/Athletic	1972
Petone	1971
Petone	1970
Petone	1969
Petone	1968
Petone	1967
Victoria University	1966
Athletic	1965
Marist Bros Old Boys/ Victoria University	1964
Marist Bros Old Boys	1963
Marist Bros Old Boys/Onslow	1962
Petone	1961
Marist Bros Old Boys	1960
Petone	1959
Victoria University	1958
Petone	1957
Petone	1956
Onslow	1955
Victoria University	1954
Victoria University	1953
Victoria University	1952
Poneke	1951
Marist Bros Old Boys	1950
Petone/St Pat's Old Boys	1949
Marist Bros Old Boys	1948
Wellington	1947
Victoria University	1946
Athletic	1945
Poneke-Oriental	1944
Poneke-Oriental	1943
Petone	1942
Athletic	1941
Athletic	1940
Wellington	1939
Petone	1938
Athletic	1937
Athletic	1936
Petone	1935
Hutt	1934
Wellington College Old Boys	1933
Poneke	1932
Hutt	1931
Petone	1930
Victoria University	1929
Victoria University	1928
Wellington College Old Boys	1927
Athletic	1926
Poneke	1925
Petone	1924
Petone	1923
Petone	1922
Poneke	1921
Petone	1920
Poneke	1919
Poneke	1918
Petone	1917
Petone	1916
Athletic	1915
Athletic and Wellington shared	1914
Athletic	1913
Athletic	1912
Athletic	1911
Oriental	1910
Poneke	1909
Melrose	1908
Petone	1907
Petone	1906
Petone	1905
Petone	1904
Poneke	1903
Melrose	1902
Wellington	1901
Melrose	1900
Petone	1899
Melrose	1898
Melrose	1897
Melrose	1896
Petone	1895
Poneke	1894
Poneke	1893
Poneke	1892
Athletic	1891
Wellington	1890
Poneke	1889
Poneke	1888
Poneke	1887
Poneke	1886
Wellington	1885
Athletic	1884
Wellington and Greytown shared	1883
Athletic	1882
No Contests	1881
Athletic	1880

== Number of titles by club ==
Club	Total Titles Won	Outright Titles	Shared Titles
Petone	40	38	2
Poneke	20	18	0
Athletic	18	16	2
Marist St Pat's	14	12	2
Wellington	13	8	5
Victoria University	10	9	1
Northern United	7	6	1
Marist Bros Old Boys	6	4	2
Melrose	6	6	0
Tawa	3	3	0
Hutt Old Boys Marist	6	6	0
Old Boys University	3	3	0
Onslow	2	1	1
Hutt	2	2	0
Wellington College Old Boys	2	2	0
Poneke-Oriental	2	2	0
Oriental-Rongotai	2	2	0
Western Suburbs	1	1	0
St Pat's Old Boys	1	0	1
Greytown	1	0	1

Statistic valid as of August 2022.

Total Jubilee Cup titles won credited to modern successor / custodian club
Club	Titles won	Current, pre-mergers / custodian teams
Petone	38	
MSP	21	Marist St Pat's: 14, Marist Bros Old Boys: 6, St Pat's Old Boys: 1
Western Suburbs	21	Western Suburbs: 1, Athletic: 18, Onslow: 2
Poneke	20	Poneke 18, Poneke-Oriental: 2
OBU	15	OBU: 3, Victoria University: 10, Wellington College Old Boys: 2
Wellington	13	
Northern United	7	
HOBM	6	HOBM: 3, Hutt 2, Hutt OB 1
Oriental-Rongotai	4	Oriental-Rongotai: 2, Poneke-Oriental: 2
Tawa	3	
Greytown	1	
Wainuiomata	0	
Upper Hutt	0	
Stokes Valley	0	
Paremata-Plimmerton	0	
Newlands	0	
Johnsonville	0	
Avalon	0	
Eastbourne	0	

Statistic valid as of July 2023.
