= 2015 June rugby union tests =

The 2015 mid-year rugby union internationals (also known as the Summer internationals in the Northern Hemisphere) refer to international rugby union matches that were mostly played in the Southern Hemisphere.

Because of the 2015 Rugby World Cup, no test series took place. This allowed the European season to finish two weeks later, with the final of the 2014–15 Top 14 season taking place on 13 June. The 2015 Super Rugby season was able to run for 21 consecutive weeks, without the three-week international break in June, to allow an earlier and shortened 2015 Rugby Championship.

Although the international window did not take place, some nations participating in the World Cup opted to play uncapped matches in preparation for the tournament. Uruguay hosted Fiji's A side, the Fiji Warriors in Montevideo, with the Warriors playing Argentina's A-side Argentina Jaguars, between the two fixtures. With Russia not competing in the 2015 Rugby World Cup, or either of World Rugby's Nations Cup or Tbilisi Cup, they toured Namibia for a two-test series.

Three historic matches also took place. Samoa hosted New Zealand in Apia for the first time as an official test match, the first Pacific nation to do so. Kenya played two test matches, against Portugal and Spain. Portugal became the first European side to visit Kenya for an official test match.

== Fixtures ==
=== 23 May ===
23 May 2015
15:30 UYT (UTC-03)

Uruguay	22–30	Fiji Warriors
Try: Penalty try 56' c Palomeque 74' c Arboleya 79' m Con: Etcheverry (2/3) 56', 75'; Pen: Etcheverry (1/1) 7'	Report (In Spanish)	Try: Ledua (2) 8' m, 42' c Dyer 32' m Vasiteri 39' m Wakaya 58' m Con: Vularika (1/5) 43'; Pen: Vuibau (1/1) 62'

Estadio Charrúa, Montevideo
Referee: Juan Sylvestre (Argentina)

Team details

FB	15	Santiago Gibernau
RW	14	Leandro Leivas
OC	13	Joaquín Prada
IC	12	Alberto Román
LW	11	Francisco Bulanti
FH	10	Jerónimo Etcheverry
SH	9	Rodrigo Silva
N8	8	Agustín Alonso
OF	7	Diego Magno
BF	6	Fernando Bascou
RL	5	Jorge Zerbino
LL	4	Santiago Vilaseca (c)
TP	3	Mario Sagario
HK	2	Germán Kessler
LP	1	Mateo Sanguinetti
Replacements:
HK	16	Carlos Arboleya	(yellow card) 60' to 70'
PR	17	Alejo Corral
PR	18	Oscar Durán
LK	19	Mathias Palomeque
FL	20	Matias Beer
LK	21	Mathias Braun
SH	22	Alejo Durán
FH	23	Manuel Blengio
Coach:
(Uruguay) Pablo Lemoine

FB	15	Tikilaci Vuibau
RW	14	Sam Speight
OC	13	John Stewart
IC	12	Eroni Vasiteri
LW	11	Nacani Wakaya
FH	10	Kini Douglas
SH	9	Serupepeli Vularika
N8	8	Johnny Dyer	(yellow card) 69' to 79'
OF	7	Meli Baivatu
BF	6	Apisai Naikatini
RL	5	Mataiasi Ucutabua
LL	4	Savenaca Tabakanalagi
TP	3	Taniela Koroi
HK	2	Sireli Ledua (c)
LP	1	Peni Ravai
Replacements:
PR	16	Seru Tabaiwalu
HK	17	Kirwan Sanday	(yellow card) 54' to 64'
PR	18	Joeli Veitayaki
N8	19	Jolame Bera
FL	20	Malakai Namalo
SH	21	Emori Waqa
CE	22	Saimoni Tuilaucala
FB	23	Kitione Ratu
Coach:
(Fiji) Senirusi Seruvakula

Touch judges:
Jason Mola (Argentina)
Esteban Filipanics (Argentina)

Notes:

- Uruguay gave this match Test Match status and awarded caps in this match.

=== 27/28/30/31 May ===
27 May 2015
19:00 UYT (UTC-03)

Argentina XV	21–23	Fiji Warriors
Try: Isa 10' c Lezana 41' c González Iglesias 50' c Con: González Iglesias (3/3) 10', 42', 51'	Report (In Spanish)	Try: Stewart 4' c Tabakanalagi 40' m Wakaya 59' m Con: Vularika (1/2) 5'; Pen: Vuibau (2/2) 14', 24'

Estadio Suppici, Colonia del Sacramento
Referee: Joaquín Montes (Uruguay)

Team details

FB	15	Santiago Cordero
RW	14	Tomás Carrió
OC	13	Jerónimo de la Fuente
IC	12	Gabriel Ascárate
LW	11	Román Miralles
FH	10	Santiago González Iglesias
SH	9	Martín Landajo (c)
N8	8	Facundo Isa
OF	7	Javier Ortega Desio	(yellow card) 79' to 80'
BF	6	Tomás Lezana
RL	5	Gerónimo Albertario
LL	4	Guido Petti
TP	3	Bruno Postiglioni
HK	2	Santiago Iglesias Valdez
LP	1	Lucas Noguera Paz
Replacements:
PR	16	Julián Montoya
HK	17	Matías Cortese
PR	18	Santiago García Botta
LK	19	Manuel Plaza
FL	20	Lisandro Ahualli de Chazal
SH	21	Gonzalo Bertranou
FH	22	Juan León Novillo
CE	23	Brian Ormson
Coach:
(Argentina) Daniel Hourcade

FB	15	Tikilaci Vuibau
RW	14	Sam Speight
OC	13	John Stewart	(yellow card) 31' to 41'
IC	12	Eroni Vasiteri
LW	11	Nacani Wakaya
FH	10	Emori Waqa
SH	9	Serupepeli Vularika
N8	8	Jolame Bera
OF	7	Johnny Dyer
BF	6	Timoci Sauvoli
RL	5	Apisai Naikatini
LL	4	Savenaca Tabakanalagi
TP	3	Kirwan Sanday
HK	2	Sireli Ledua (c)
LP	1	Peni Ravai
Replacements:
PR	16	Jale Sassen
HK	17	Joeli Veitayaki
PR	18	Lee-Roy Atalifo
LK	19	Mataiasi Ucutabua
FL	20	Meli Baivatu
FH	21	Kini Douglas
CE	22	Saimoni Tuilaucala
WG	23	Josaia Qumi
Coach:
(Fiji) Senirusi Seruvakula

Touch judges:
Francisco González (Uruguay)
José Covassi (Argentina)

28 May 2015
19:45 IST (UTC+01)

Ireland	21–22	Barbarians
Try: Gilroy 15' c Henry 61' c Jackson 79' c Con: Madigan (3/3) 16', 61', 79'	Report	Try: Cuthbert (2) 4' m, 72' c Kirchner 42' c Con: Gopperth (2/3) 43', 74'; Pen: Gopperth (1/1) 54'

Thomond Park, Limerick
Referee: Greg Garner (England)

Team details

FB	15	Rob Kearney
RW	14	David Kearney
OC	13	Collie O'Shea		(substituted off) 74'
IC	12	Luke Marshall		(substituted off) 50'
LW	11	Craig Gilroy
FH	10	Ian Madigan
SH	9	Eoin Reddan		(substituted off) 62'
N8	8	Jamie Heaslip (c)
OF	7	Chris Henry					(substituted off) 74'
BF	6	Robbie Diack		(substituted off) 40'	(substituted on) 42'	(substituted off) 54'	(substituted on) 74'
RL	5	Dan Tuohy		(substituted off) 62'
LL	4	Devin Toner
TP	3	Tadhg Furlong		(substituted off) 62'
HK	2	Richardt Strauss		54' to 58'
LP	1	Jack McGrath	(yellow card) 32' to 42'		(substituted off) 42'
Replacements:
HK	16	Rob Herring		(substituted on) 54'	(substituted off) 58'
PR	17	Michael Bent		(substituted on) 40'
PR	18	Mike Ross		(substituted on) 62'
LK	19	Ben Marshall		(substituted on) 62'
FL	20	Jordi Murphy				(substituted on) 54'
SH	21	Luke McGrath		(substituted on) 62'
FH	22	Paddy Jackson		(substituted on) 50'
WG	23	Cian Kelleher		(substituted on) 74'
Coach:
(New Zealand) Joe Schmidt

FB	15	(South Africa) Zane Kirchner
RW	14	(Wales) Alex Cuthbert
OC	13	(New Zealand) Joe Rokocoko		(substituted off) 60'
IC	12	(South Africa) Wynand Olivier
LW	11	(New Zealand) David Smith
FH	10	(New Zealand) Jimmy Gopperth
SH	9	(South Africa) Ruan Pienaar
N8	8	(Japan) Koliniasi Holani		(substituted off) 45'
OF	7	(South Africa) Gerhard Vosloo
BF	6	(Ireland) Shane Jennings (c)
RL	5	(Georgia (country)) Konstantin Mikautadze
LL	4	(Uruguay) Rodrigo Capó Ortega		(substituted off) 7'
TP	3	(Wales) Adam Jones
HK	2	(South Africa) Deon Fourie		(substituted off) 79'
LP	1	(Argentina) Roberto Tejerizo	(yellow card) 40' to 50'			(substituted off) 58'
Replacements:
HK	16	(England) Dave Ward		(substituted on) 79'
PR	17	(New Zealand) Saimone Taumoepeau		(substituted on) 45'	(substituted off) 50'	(substituted on) 58'
PR	18	(Argentina) Matías Díaz
LK	19	(Scotland) Nathan Hines		(substituted on) 7'
FL	20	(Australia) George Smith			(substituted on) 50'
SH	21	(Argentina) Tomás Cubelli
FH	22	(Samoa) Tusi Pisi
FB	23	(South Africa) Gio Aplon		(substituted on) 60'
Coach:
(New Zealand) Robbie Deans

Man of the Match:
(South Africa) Deon Fourie (Barbarians)

Touch judges:
David Wilkinson (Ireland)
Andy Brace (Ireland)
Television match official:
Dermot Moloney (Ireland)

Notes:

- This was Nathan Hines and Shane Jennings last professional match.

30 May 2015
16:00 EAT (UTC+03)

Kenya	41–15	Portugal
Try: Mukidza 8' c Omiyo 20' c Nyikuli 47' c Oliech 55' c Aringo 76' c Con: Asiligwa (2/2) 9', 21'; Mukidza (3/3) 49', 56', 77'; Pen: Mukidza (1/2) 36'; Drop: Adimo (1/1) 65'	Report	Try: Ferrador 28' c Appleton 79' m Con: Ricardo (1/2) 30'; Pen: Ricardo (1/1) 33'

RFUEA Ground, Nairobi
Attendance: 5,000
Referee: Oscar Lambert (Namibia)

Team details

FB	15	Sammy Oliech
RW	14	Darwin Mukidza
OC	13	Fabian Olando
IC	12	Kelvin Omiyo
LW	11	Jacob Ojee
FH	10	Isaac Adimo
SH	9	Lyle Asiligwa
N8	8	Joshua Chisanga
OF	7	Michael Okombe
BF	6	Brian Nyikuli (c)
RL	5	Emmanuel Mavala
LL	4	Oliver Mang’eni
TP	3	Curtis Lilako
HK	2	Sammy Warui
LP	1	Moses Amusala
Replacements:
HK	16	Peter Karia
PR	17	Duncan Mwangi
PR	18	Isaiah Nyariki
LK	19	Martin Owillah
FL	20	Ronnie Mwenesi
SH	21	Robert Aringo
FH	22	Vincent Mose
WG	23	Dennis Muhanji
Coach:
(South Africa) Jerome Paarwater

FB	15	António Ferrador
RW	14	Tomás Appleton
OC	13	Manuel Pereira
IC	12	Adrien Timoteo
LW	11	Tomás Noronha
FH	10	Yannick Ricardo
SH	9	Maxime Tonieta
N8	8	Gonçalo Uva
OF	7	Vasco Uva (c)
BF	6	Thibault Freitas
RL	5	David dos Reis
LL	4	Eric dos Santos
TP	3	Tony Martins
HK	2	Miguel Vilaça
LP	1	Jorge Segurado
Replacements:
HK	16	Duarte Diniz
PR	17	Francisco Domingues
PR	18	Anthony Alves
LK	19	Diogo Toorn
FL	20	Filipe Pereira
SH	21	André Aquino
FH	22	João Diogo Silva
CE	23	João Silva
Coach:
(Portugal) João Luís Pinto

Touch judges:
Godwin Karuga (Kenya)
John Bosco Muamba (Kenya)

Notes:

- Vasco Uva earned his 100th test cap.

31 May 2015
15:00 BST (UTC+01)

England	73–12	Barbarians
Try: Yarde 10' c Slater 20' c Clifford 26' c Wade (3) 30' c, 34' c, 73' c Cipriani (2) 38' c, 78' c Slade 41' c Beaumont 59' c Con: Cipriani (10/10) 11', 21', 27', 31', 34', 39', 42', 60', 74', 80'; Pen: Cipriani (1/1) 17'	Report	Try: Thorn 12' m Waldrom 48' c Con: Pisi (1/2) 49'

Twickenham, London
Attendance: 34,667
Referee: George Clancy (Ireland)

Team details

FB	15	Mathew Tait	(substituted off) 55'
RW	14	Christian Wade
OC	13	Elliot Daly
IC	12	Henry Slade
LW	11	Marland Yarde	(substituted off) 61'
FH	10	Danny Cipriani
SH	9	Lee Dickson (c)	(substituted off) 64'
N8	8	Josh Beaumont
OF	7	Jack Clifford
BF	6	Mark Wilson
RL	5	Joe Launchbury	(substituted off) 49'
LL	4	Ed Slater	(substituted off) 55'
TP	3	Kieran Brookes	(substituted off) 61'
HK	2	Luke Cowan-Dickie	(substituted off) 49'
LP	1	Matt Mullan	(substituted off) 49'
Replacements:
HK	16	Tommy Taylor	(substituted on) 49'
PR	17	Alex Waller	(substituted on) 49'
PR	18	Gareth Denman	(substituted on) 61'
LK	19	James Gaskell	(substituted on) 49'
FL	20	Jon Fisher	(substituted on) 55'
SH	21	Will Chudley	(substituted on) 64'
FH	22	Shane Geraghty	(substituted on) 55'
WG	23	Alex Lewington	(substituted on) 61'
Coach:
(England) Stuart Lancaster

FB	15	(South Africa) Gio Aplon		(substituted off) 45'
RW	14	(New Zealand) David Smith
OC	13	(New Zealand) Joe Rokocoko
IC	12	(South Africa) Wynand Olivier		(substituted off) 53'
LW	11	(England) Ugo Monye
FH	10	(Samoa) Tusi Pisi
SH	9	(Argentina) Tomás Cubelli		(substituted off) 72'
N8	8	(England) Thomas Waldrom	(yellow card) 20' to 30'
OF	7	(Australia) George Smith
BF	6	(New Zealand) George Whitelock		(substituted off) 40'
RL	5	(New Zealand) Brad Thorn (c)	(yellow card) 70' to 80'
LL	4	(United States) Samu Manoa
TP	3	(Argentina) Matías Díaz		(substituted off) 40'
HK	2	(England) Dave Ward		(substituted off) 40'
LP	1	(New Zealand) Saimone Taumoepeau		(substituted off) 40'
Replacements:
HK	16	(South Africa) Deon Fourie		(substituted on) 40'
PR	17	(Argentina) Roberto Tejerizo		(substituted on) 40'
PR	18	(Wales) Adam Jones		(substituted on) 40'
LK	19	(Scotland) Nathan Hines
FL	20	(Argentina) Pablo Matera		(substituted on) 40'
SH	21	(South Africa) Ruan Pienaar		(substituted on) 72'
FH	22	(New Zealand) Stephen Brett		(substituted on) 53'
WG	23	(Japan) Yoshikazu Fujita		(substituted on) 45'
Coach:
(New Zealand) Robbie Deans

Man of the Match:
Danny Cipriani (England)

Touch judges:
Luke Pearce (England)
Paul Dix (England)
Television match official:
Sean Davey (England)

Notes:

- This was Ugo Monye's and Brad Thorn's last professional match.
- This was England's largest winning margin over the Barbarians, surpassing the 31 point winning margin recorded in May 2012.
- This was the Barbarians largest ever defeat. It was previously the 59–8 loss to the British and Irish Lions during the 2013 British and Irish Lions tour to Australia.

31 May 2015
16:00 UYT (UTC-03)

Uruguay	22–42	Fiji Warriors
Try: Alonso 38' c Kessler 63' m A. Vilaseca 66' c Con: Ormaechea (2/3) 38', 66'; Pen: Ormaechea (1/2) 12'	Report (In Spanish)	Try: Vasiteri (2) 15' c, 32' c Stewart 20' c Vularika 26' c Douglas 69' m Con: Vularika (4/5) 16', 21', 28', 33'; Pen: Vularika (3/4) 10', 25', 42'

Estadio Charrúa, Montevideo
Referee: Federico Anselmi (Argentina)

Team details

FB	15	Rodrigo Silva
RW	14	Francisco Bulanti
OC	13	Santiago Gibernau
IC	12	Alberto Román
LW	11	Joaquín Prada
FH	10	Manuel Blengio
SH	9	Agustín Ormaechea
N8	8	Agustín Alonso
OF	7	Diego Magno
BF	6	Matías Beer	(yellow card) 2' to 12'
RL	5	Jorge Zerbino
LL	4	Santiago Vilaseca (c)
TP	3	Mario Sagario
HK	2	Nicolás Klappenbach
LP	1	Alejo Corral
Replacements:
PR	16	Oscar Durán
HK	17	German Kessler
PR	18	Mateo Sanguinetti
LK	19	Mathias Palomeque
FL	20	Fernando Bascou
LK	21	Mathias Braun
SH	22	Alejo Durán
CE	23	Andrés Vilaseca
Coach:
(Uruguay) Pablo Lemoine

FB	15	Tikilaci Vuibau
RW	14	Nacani Wakaya
OC	13	John Stewart
IC	12	Eroni Vasiteri (c)
LW	11	Josaia Quminakelo
FH	10	Kini Douglas
SH	9	Serupepeli Vularika	(yellow card) 47' to 57'
N8	8	Johnny Dyer	(yellow card) 60' to 70'
OF	7	Jolame Bera
BF	6	Timoci Sauvoli
RL	5	Savenaca Tabakanalagi
LL	4	Apisai Naikatini
TP	3	Lee-Roy Atalifo
HK	2	Jale Sassen
LP	1	Peni Ravai
Replacements:
HK	16	Sireli Ledua
PR	17	Joeli Veitayaki
PR	18	Taniela Koroi
LK	19	Mataiasi Ucutabua
FL	20	Malakai Namalo
SH	21	Emori Waqa
CE	22	Saimoni Tuilaucala
WG	23	Sam Speight
Coach:
(Fiji) Senirusi Seruvakula

Touch judges:
Damian Schneider (Argentina)
Pablo Deluca (Argentina)

Notes:

- Uruguay gave this match Test Match status, and awarded caps in this match.

=== 20 June ===
20 June 2015
15:30 ART (UTC-03)

Argentina	22–28	(France) French Barbarians
Try: Cubelli 24' c Noguera Paz 42' c Cordero 46' m Con: Socino (2/3) 25', 43'; Pen: Socino (1/2) 15'	Report (In Spanish)	Try: Tastet 5' m Penalty try 22' c Orioli 38' c Con: Urdapilleta (2/3) 22', 39'; Pen: Urdapilleta (3/3) 60', 64', 75'

Old Resian Club, Rosario
Referee: Angus Gardner (Australia)

Team details

FB	15	Román Miralles
RW	14	Joaquín Tuculet		(substituted off) 61'
OC	13	Matías Moroni
IC	12	Jerónimo de la Fuente		(substituted off) 53'
LW	11	Santiago Cordero
FH	10	Juan Pablo Socino
SH	9	Tomás Cubelli (c)		(substituted off) 61'
N8	8	Benjamín Macome		(substituted off) 49'
OF	7	Javier Ortega Desio
BF	6	Tomás Lezana		(substituted off) 72'
RL	5	Matías Alemanno
LL	4	Guido Petti
TP	3	Nahuel Tetaz Chaparro		(substituted off) 48'	(substituted on) 72'	(substituted off) 79'
HK	2	Matías Cortese		(substituted off) 48'
LP	1	Lucas Noguera Paz		(substituted off) 61'
Replacements:
HK	16	Santiago Iglesias Valdez		(substituted on) 48'
PR	17	Matías Díaz	(yellow card) 69' to 79'	(substituted on) 48'
N8	18	Facundo Isa		(substituted on) 49'	(substituted off) 72'	(substituted on) 79'
PR	19	Bruno Postiglioni		(substituted on) 61'
FL	20	Lisandro Ahualli de Chazal		(substituted on) 72'
SH	21	Martín Landajo		(substituted on) 61'
FH	22	Santiago González Iglesias		(substituted on) 53'
WG	23	Belisario Agulla		(substituted on) 61'
Coach:
(Argentina) Daniel Hourcade

FB	15	(France) Gaëtan Germain
RW	14	(France) Julien Jané	(substituted off) 61'
OC	13	(France) Henry Chavancy
IC	12	(France) Julien Rey
LW	11	(France) Benjamin Lapeyre
FH	10	(Argentina) Benjamín Urdapilleta	(substituted off) 77'
SH	9	(South Africa) Heini Adams (c)	(substituted off) 68'
N8	8	(France) Virgile Bruni	(substituted off) 65'
OF	7	(France) Karim Ghezal
BF	6	(France) Julien Tastet
RL	5	(France) Jocelino Suta	16' to 26'
LL	4	(France) Thibault Lassalle			(substituted off) 54'
TP	3	(France) Walter Desmaison	(substituted off) 40'
HK	2	(France) Jean-Charles Orioli	(substituted off) 48'
LP	1	(France) Lucas Pointud	(substituted off) 48'
Replacements:
HK	16	(France) Brice Mach	(substituted on) 48'
PR	17	(France) Antoine Tichit	(substituted on) 48'
PR	18	(France) Jean-Baptiste Poux	(substituted on) 40'
FH	19	(France) Gilles Bosch	(substituted on) 77'
WG	20	(Ivory Coast) Silvère Tian	(substituted on) 61'
FL	21	(France) Benoit Guyot	(substituted on) 65'
SH	22	(France) Jérôme Fillol	(substituted on) 68'
LK	23	(France) Arnaud Méla	(substituted on) 16'	(substituted off) 26'	(substituted on) 54'
Coach:
(France) Fabrice Landreau (France) Philippe Rouge-Thomas

Touch judges:
Ben O'Keeffe (New Zealand)
Joaquín Montes (Uruguay)

=== 26 June ===
26 June 2015
18:30 ART (UTC-03)

Argentina	21–9	(France) French Barbarians
Try: Matera 25' m Ortega Desio 61' c Con: Socino (1/2) 62'; Pen: Socino (3/3) 20', 40', 43'	Report (In Spanish)	Pen: Urdapilleta (3/4) 2', 39', 51'

La Plata Rugby Club, La Plata
Referee: Ben O'Keeffe (New Zealand)

Team details

FB	15	Román Miralles	(substituted off) 65'
RW	14	Matías Moroni
OC	13	Jerónimo de la Fuente
IC	12	Juan Pablo Socino
LW	11	Tomás Carrió
FH	10	Santiago González Iglesias	(substituted off) 51'
SH	9	Martín Landajo (c)	(substituted off) 63'
N8	8	Facundo Isa
OF	7	Javier Ortega Desio
BF	6	Pablo Matera	(substituted off) 43'
RL	5	Tomás Lavanini
LL	4	Guido Petti	(substituted off) 63'
TP	3	Matías Díaz	(substituted off) 54'
HK	2	Julián Montoya	(substituted off) 57'
LP	1	Lucas Noguera Paz	(substituted off) 63'
Replacements:
HK	16	Santiago Iglesias Valdez	(substituted on) 57'
PR	17	Bruno Postiglioni	(substituted on) 63'
PR	18	Nahuel Tetaz Chaparro	(substituted on) 54'
LK	19	Matías Alemanno	(substituted on) 63'
N8	20	Benjamín Macome	(substituted on) 43'
SH	21	Tomás Cubelli	(substituted on) 63'
FH	22	Nicolás Sánchez	(substituted on) 51'
FB	23	Lucas González Amorosino	(substituted on) 65'
Coach:
(Argentina) Daniel Hourcade

FB	15	(France) Geoffrey Palis
RW	14	(France) Benjamin Lapeyre
OC	13	(France) Henry Chavancy	(substituted off) 63'
IC	12	(France) Jonathan Danty
LW	11	(Ivory Coast) Silvère Tian
FH	10	(Argentina) Benjamín Urdapilleta	(substituted off) 70'
SH	9	(France) Jérôme Fillol (c)	(substituted off) 63'
N8	8	(France) Virgile Bruni
OF	7	(France) Pierre Rabadan	(substituted off) 51'
BF	6	(France) Antoine Burban
RL	5	(France) Arnaud Méla	(substituted off) 67'
LL	4	(France) Thibault Lassalle
TP	3	(France) Jean-Baptiste Poux	(substituted off) 57'
HK	2	(France) Brice Mach	(substituted off) 43'
LP	1	(France) Antoine Tichit	(substituted off) 43'
Replacements:
HK	16	(France) Jean-Charles Orioli	(substituted on) 43'
PR	17	(France) Lucas Pointud	(substituted on) 43'
PR	18	(France) Walter Desmaison	(substituted on) 57'
FH	19	(France) Gilles Bosch	(substituted on) 70'
FL	20	(France) Julien Tastet	(substituted on) 51'
SH	21	(South Africa) Heini Adams	(substituted on) 63'
CE	22	(France) Julien Rey	(substituted on) 63'
LK	23	(France) Jocelino Suta	(substituted on) 67'
Coach:
(France) Fabrice Landreau (France) Philippe Rouge-Thomas

Touch judges:
Angus Gardner (Australia)
Joaquín Montes (Uruguay)
Television match official:
Pablo Deluca (Argentina)

=== 8/11 July ===
8 July 2015
15:00 WST (UTC+13)

Samoa	16–25	New Zealand
Try: Fa'osiliva 64' c Con: Nanai-Williams (1/1) 65'; Pen: T. Pisi (3/4) 22', 50', 55'	Report	Try: Moala 46' c Con: Carter (1/1) 47'; Pen: Carter (6/7) 6', 17', 27', 33', 59', 74'

Apia Park, Apia
Attendance: 8,104
Referee: Jaco Peyper (South Africa)

Team details

FB	15	Tim Nanai-Williams
RW	14	Alofa Alofa	(substituted off) 62'
OC	13	Paul Perez
IC	12	Johnny Leota	(substituted off) 72'
LW	11	Alesana Tuilagi
FH	10	Tusi Pisi	(substituted off) 66'
SH	9	Kahn Fotuali'i
N8	8	Ofisa Treviranus (c)	(substituted off) 40'
OF	7	Jack Lam
BF	6	Alafoti Fa'osiliva
RL	5	Kane Thompson
LL	4	Filo Paulo	(substituted off) 63'
TP	3	Census Johnston	(substituted off) 55'
HK	2	Ole Avei	(substituted off) 55'
LP	1	Sakaria Taulafo	(substituted off) 72'
Replacements:
HK	16	Manu Leiataua	(substituted on) 55'
PR	17	Viliamu Afatia	(substituted on) 72'
PR	18	Anthony Perenise	(substituted on) 55'
LK	19	Joe Tekori	(substituted on) 63'
FL	20	Maurie Fa'asavalu	(substituted on) 40'
SH	21	Pele Cowley	(substituted on) 66'
CE	22	Faialaga Afamasaga	(substituted on) 72'
WG	23	Ken Pisi	(substituted on) 62'
Coach:
(Samoa) Stephen Betham

FB	15	Israel Dagg	(substituted off) 52'
RW	14	George Moala			(substituted off) 70'
OC	13	Ryan Crotty
IC	12	Sonny Bill Williams
LW	11	Charles Piutau
FH	10	Dan Carter
SH	9	Andrew Ellis	(substituted off) 63'
N8	8	Kieran Read
OF	7	Richie McCaw (c)
BF	6	Jerome Kaino	(substituted off) 59'
RL	5	Sam Whitelock			(substituted off) 59'
LL	4	Luke Romano	20' to 34'
TP	3	Owen Franks	(substituted off) 57'
HK	2	Keven Mealamu	(substituted off) 63'
LP	1	Tony Woodcock	(substituted off) 47'
Replacements:
HK	16	Hika Elliot	(substituted on) 63'
PR	17	Wyatt Crockett	(substituted on) 47'
PR	18	Nepo Laulala	(substituted on) 57'
LK	19	Brodie Retallick	(substituted on) 20'	(substituted off) 34'	(substituted on) 59'
FL	20	Matt Todd	(substituted on) 59'
SH	21	Brad Weber	(substituted on) 63'
FH	22	Colin Slade	(substituted on) 52'	(substituted off) 66'	(substituted on) 70'
CE	23	Charlie Ngatai		(substituted on) 66'
Coach:
(New Zealand) Steve Hansen

Touch judges:
Angus Gardner (Australia)
Rohan Hoffmann (Australia)
Television match official:
George Ayoub (Australia)

Notes:

- This was the first match played by New Zealand against a Pacific Island team in the Pacific, and they became the first SANZAR team to play in Apia.
- Faialaga Afamasaga and Tim Nanai-Williams made their international debuts for Samoa.
- Nepo Laulala, George Moala, Charlie Ngatai and Brad Weber made their international debuts for New Zealand.

11 July 2015
15:00 FJT (UTC+12)

Fiji	26–27	Māori All Blacks
Try: Murimurivalu 3' m Nadolo 34' m Qera 40' c Con: Matavesi (1/1) 40'; Pen: Nadolo (3/3) 13', 24', 33'	Report	Try: R. Ioane 29' c D. McKenzie 52' c E. Dixon 69' c Con: M. McKenzie (2/2) 30', 53'; Black (1/1) 70'; Pen: M. McKenzie (2/2) 19', 42'

ANZ National Stadium, Suva
Referee: Angus Gardner (Australia)

Team details

FB	15	Kini Murimurivalu
RW	14	Benito Masilevu
OC	13	Vereniki Goneva
IC	12	Gabiriele Lovobalavu
LW	11	Nemani Nadolo
FH	10	Josh Matavesi
SH	9	Nemia Kenatale
N8	8	Akapusi Qera (c)
OF	7	Malakai Ravulo
BF	6	Dominiko Waqaniburotu
RL	5	Leone Nakarawa
LL	4	Api Ratuniyarawa
TP	3	Manasa Saulo
HK	2	Talemaitoga Tuapati
LP	1	Campese Ma'afu
Replacements:
HK	16	Viliame Veikoso
PR	17	Peni Ravai
PR	18	Isei Colati
FL	19	Nemia Soqeta
N8	20	Sakiusa Matadigo
SH	21	Nikola Matawalu
FH	22	Ben Volavola
WG	23	Napolioni Nalaga
Coach:
(New Zealand) John McKee

FB	15	Damian McKenzie
RW	14	Rieko Ioane
OC	13	Matt Proctor
IC	12	Charlie Ngatai (c)
LW	11	Kurt Baker
FH	10	Marty McKenzie
SH	9	Tawera Kerr-Barlow
N8	8	Blade Thomson
OF	7	Mitchell Crosswell
BF	6	Akira Ioane
RL	5	Hayden Triggs
LL	4	Jacob Skeen
TP	3	Ben May
HK	2	Ash Dixon
LP	1	Joe Moody
Replacements:
HK	16	Quentin MacDonald
PR	17	Brendon Edmonds
PR	18	Josh Hohneck
FL	19	Heiden Bedwell-Curtis
N8	20	Elliot Dixon
SH	21	Jamison Gibson-Park
FH	22	Otere Black
CE	23	Jason Emery
Coach:
(New Zealand) Colin Cooper

Touch judges:
Jaco Peyper (South Africa)
Rohan Hoffmann (Australia)

Notes:

- Benito Masilevu and Ben Volavola made their international debuts for Fiji.
- Fiji gave this match Test Match status and awarded caps in this match.

11 July 2015
15:00 WAT (UTC+01)

Namibia	39–19	Russia
Try: R. Van Wyk (2) 15' c, 60' m Jantjies 51' c Greyling 65' c Deysel 78' c Con: Kotzé (3/4) 16', 52', 79'; Jantjies (1/1) 65'; Pen: Kotzé (2/6) 4', 31'	Report	Try: Galinovskiy 7' c Gresev 40' m Chegodaev 71' c Con: Kushnarev (2/3) 8', 72'

Hage Geingob Rugby Stadium, Windhoek
Attendance: 3,000
Referee: Lesego Legoete (South Africa)

Team details

FB	15	Johann Tromp
RW	14	David Philander
OC	13	Danie van Wyk
IC	12	Johan Deysel
LW	11	Russell van Wyk
FH	10	Theuns Kotzé
SH	9	Eugene Jantjies
N8	8	Tinus du Plessis
OF	7	Thomasau Forbes
BF	6	Jacques Burger (c)
RL	5	Janco Venter
LL	4	Tjiuee Uanivi
TP	3	Casper Viviers
HK	2	DG Wiese
LP	1	Jaco Engels
Replacements:
HK	16	Torsten van Jaarsveld
PR	17	Raoul Larson
PR	18	AJ de Klerk
FL	19	Renaldo Bothma
FL	20	Rohan Kitshoff
SH	21	Arthur Bouwer
CE	22	JC Greyling
FB	23	Chrysander Botha
Coach:
(Wales) Phil Davies

FB	15	Anton Ryabov
RW	14	Igor Galinovskiy
OC	13	Dimitry Gerasimov
IC	12	Vladimir Rudenko
LW	11	Andrei Otrokov
FH	10	Yuri Kushnarev
SH	9	Alexey Shcherban
N8	8	Victor Gresev
OF	7	Dimitri Krotov
BF	6	Andrei Temnov (c)
RL	5	Pavel Butenko
LL	4	Andrei Garbuzov
TP	3	Innokenty Zykov
HK	2	Stanislav Selskiy
LP	1	Aleksey Volkov
Replacements:
HK	16	Yevgeny Matveyev
PR	17	Vladimir Podrezov
PR	18	Evgeni Pronenko
N8	19	Alexei Panasenko
FL	20	Danila Chegodaev
SH	21	Ruslan Yagudin
CE	22	Evgeny Kolomytsev
WG	23	Alexey Mikhaltsov
Coach:
(Russia) Alexander Pervukhin

Man of the Match:
Russell van Wyk (Namibia)

Touch judges:
Jacky Husselmann (Namibia)
Harry van Niekerk (Namibia)

Notes:

- This was Namibia's first ever win over Russia.
- Namibia Captain Jacques Burger played in his first home since 2009, and was his first win since 2010.

11 July 2015
17:00 SAST (UTC+02)

South Africa	46–10	World XV
Try: De Allende (2) 9' m, 79' c Etzebeth 17' c Le Roux (3) 23' c, 53' m, 65' m Reinach 74' c Con: Pollard (2/5) 18', 24'; Lambie (2/2) 75', 80'; Pen: Pollard (1/2) 4'	Report	Try: Burden 34' c Con: Harris (1/1) 35'; Pen: Harris (1/2) 20'

DHL Newlands, Cape Town
Referee: John Lacey (Ireland)

Team details

FB	15	Willie le Roux	(yellow card) 69' to 79'
RW	14	JP Pietersen
OC	13	Jesse Kriel		(substituted off) 60'
IC	12	Damian de Allende
LW	11	Bryan Habana		(substituted off) 54'
FH	10	Handré Pollard
SH	9	Ruan Pienaar		(substituted off) 67'
N8	8	Warren Whiteley		(substituted off) 53'
OF	7	Marcell Coetzee
BF	6	Francois Louw	(yellow card) 59' to 69'
RL	5	Victor Matfield (c)
LL	4	Eben Etzebeth		(substituted off) 67'
TP	3	Jannie du Plessis		(substituted off) 53'
HK	2	Bismarck du Plessis		(substituted off) 53'
LP	1	Tendai Mtawarira		(substituted off) 40'
Replacements:
HK	16	Adriaan Strauss		(substituted on) 53'
PR	17	Trevor Nyakane		(substituted on) 40'
PR	18	Vincent Koch		(substituted on) 53'
FL	19	Oupa Mohojé		(substituted on) 67'
FL	20	Schalk Burger		(substituted on) 53'
CE	21	Cobus Reinach		(substituted on) 67'
FH	22	Pat Lambie		(substituted on) 54'
CE	23	Jean de Villiers		(substituted on) 60'
Coach:
(South Africa) Heyneke Meyer

FB	15	(England) Delon Armitage
RW	14	(Australia) Lachlan Turner	(substituted off) 60'
OC	13	(South Africa) JJ Engelbrecht
IC	12	(France) Maxime Mermoz
LW	11	(New Zealand) David Smith
FH	10	(Australia) Mike Harris	(substituted off) 69'
SH	9	(Australia) Luke Burgess	(substituted off) 41'
N8	8	(New Zealand) Luke Whitelock
OF	7	(England) Steffon Armitage
BF	6	(New Zealand) Jordan Taufua
RL	5	(South Africa) Bakkies Botha (c)	(substituted off) 12'	(substituted on) 22'	(substituted off) 57'
LL	4	(New Zealand) Ali Williams			(substituted off) 28'
TP	3	(New Zealand) Carl Hayman	(substituted off) 51'
HK	2	(South Africa) Craig Burden	(substituted off) 41'
LP	1	(South Africa) Gurthrö Steenkamp	(substituted off) 51'
Replacements:
HK	16	(France) David Roumieu	(substituted on) 41'
PR	17	(France) Alexandre Menini	(substituted on) 51'
PR	18	(South Africa) Petrus du Plessis	(substituted on) 51'
LK	19	(South Africa) Flip van der Merwe	(substituted on) 12'	(substituted off) 22'	(substituted on) 28'
FL	20	(France) Louis-Benoît Madaule			(substituted on) 57'
SH	21	(France) Maxime Machenaud	(substituted on) 41'
CE	22	(New Zealand) Andrew Horrell	(substituted on) 69'
WG	23	(New Zealand) Rudi Wulf	(substituted on) 60'
Coach:
(New Zealand) Robbie Deans (France) Bernard Laporte

Man of the Match:
Damian de Allende (South Africa)

Touch judges:
Marius van der Westhuizen (South Africa)
Jason Jaftha (South Africa)
Television match official:
Deon van Blommestein (Australia)

=== 18 July ===
18 July 2015
19:35 NZST (UTC+12)

Māori All Blacks	17–34	New Zealand Barbarians
Try: D. McKenzie 47' c Rei 70' c Con: M. McKenzie (1/1) 47'; Black (1/1) 71'; Pen: M. McKenzie (1/1) 5'	Report	Try: Gibson 24' m Drummond 28' c Tamanivalu 57' c Osborne 60' m Taylor 78' c Con: Taylor (3/5) 29', 58', 79'; Pen: Taylor (1/1) 3'

Eden Park, Auckland
Referee: Kane McBride (New Zealand)

Team details

FB	15	Damian McKenzie
RW	14	Rieko Ioane
OC	13	Sean Wainui
IC	12	Charlie Ngatai (c)
LW	11	Matt Proctor
FH	10	Marty McKenzie
SH	9	Tawera Kerr-Barlow
N8	8	Elliot Dixon
OF	7	Mitchell Crosswell
BF	6	Blade Thomson
RL	5	Hayden Triggs
LL	4	Joe Wheeler
TP	3	Brendon Edmonds
HK	2	Ash Dixon
LP	1	Joe Moody
Replacements:
HK	16	Quentin MacDonald
PR	17	Joe Royal
PR	18	Marcel Renata
FL	19	Akira Ioane
FL	20	Joe Edwards
SH	21	Brad Weber
FH	22	Otere Black
WG	23	Codey Rei
Coach:
(New Zealand) Colin Cooper

FB	15	Andrew Horrell
RW	14	Cory Jane
OC	13	Seta Tamanivalu
IC	12	George Moala
LW	11	Patrick Osborne
FH	10	Tom Taylor
SH	9	Mitchell Drummond
N8	8	Luke Whitelock
OF	7	Blake Gibson
BF	6	Brad Shields (c)
RL	5	Dominic Bird
LL	4	Alex Ainley
TP	3	Ofa Tu'ungafasi
HK	2	Liam Coltman
LP	1	Mitchell Graham
Replacements:
HK	16	James Parsons
PR	17	Reggie Goodes
PR	18	Ben Tameifuna
LK	19	Mark Reddish
N8	20	Jordan Taufua
SH	21	Te Toiroa Tahuiorangi
FH	22	Ihaia West
CE	23	Richard Buckman
Coach:
(New Zealand) Scott McLeod

Touch judges:
Brendon Pickerill (New Zealand)
Angus Mabey (New Zealand)
Television match official:
Shaun Elliott (New Zealand)

18 July 2015
16:00 EAT (UTC+03)

Kenya	36–27	Spain
Try: Mukidza (2) 7' m, 13' m Mang’eni 37' c Oliech 46' m Penalty try 70' c Buyachi 78' c Con: Mukidza (3/6) 38', 70', 79'	Report	Try: Penalty try 43' c Bonán 50' c Baró 60' c Con: Linklater (3/3) 44', 51', 60'; Pen: Linklater (2/3) 3', 25'

RFUEA Ground, Nairobi
Referee: Greg Garner (England)

Team details

FB	15	Vincent Mose
RW	14	Darwin Mukidza
OC	13	Samuel Motari
IC	12	Kelvin Omiyo
LW	11	Jacob Ojee
FH	10	Samuel Oliech
SH	9	Edwin Achayo
N8	8	Joshua Chisanga
OF	7	Michael Okombe
BF	6	Brian Nyikuli (c)
RL	5	Oliver Mang’eni
LL	4	Ronnie Mwenesi
TP	3	Isaiah Nyariki
HK	2	Samuel Warui
LP	1	Moses Amusala
Replacements:
HK	16	Peter Karia
PR	17	Curtis Lilako
LK	18	Davis Chenge
FL	19	Wilson Kopondo
SH	20	Robert Aringo
WG	21	Dennis Muhanji
FH	22	Isaac Adimo
PR	23	Lawrence Buyachi
Coach:
(South Africa) Jerome Paarwater

FB	15	Marcos Puig
RW	14	Pierre García
OC	13	Pablo Fontes
IC	12	Thibaut Álvarez
LW	11	Nil Baró
FH	10	Brad Linklater
SH	9	Gregory Maiquez
N8	8	Jaime Nava (c)
OF	7	Mathieu Roca
BF	6	Anibal Bonán
RL	5	Jesús Recuerda
LL	4	David González
TP	3	Francisco Blanco
HK	2	Joe Hutchinson
LP	1	Francisco Sanz Benlloch
Replacements:
PR	16	Ion Insausti
HK	17	Jonathan Phipps
PR	18	Fernando Martin Lopez Perez
LK	19	Victor Sanchez Borrego
FL	20	Javier De Juan
FL	21	Jose Luis del Valle
SH	22	Facundo Munilla
CE	23	Guillermo Mateu
Coach:
(Spain) Santiago Santos

Touch judges:
Raymond Oruo (Kenya)
Amos Wamanga (Kenya)
Television match official:
Karimi Mwangi (Kenya)

18 July 2015
15:00 WAT (UTC+01)

Namibia	45–5	Russia
Try: Van Wyk 9' c Kotzé 46' m Marais (3) 59' c, 74' c, 80' c Con: Kotzé (4/5) 10', 60', 75', 80'; Pen: Kotzé (4/4) 3', 22', 28', 64'	Report	Try: Matveyev 33' m

Hage Geingob Rugby Stadium, Windhoek
Referee: Marius van der Westhuizen (South Africa)

Team details

FB	15	Chrysander Botha
RW	14	Conrad Marais
OC	13	JC Greyling
IC	12	Johan Deysel
LW	11	Russell van Wyk
FH	10	Theuns Kotzé
SH	9	Eugene Jantjies
N8	8	Rezando Botes
OF	7	Tinus du Plessis
BF	6	Jacques Burger (c)
RL	5	Janco Venter
LL	4	Tjiuee Uanivi
TP	3	Raoul Larson
HK	2	Torsten van Jaarsveld
LP	1	Casper Viviers
Replacements:
HK	16	Louis van der Westhuizen
PR	17	Jaco Engels
PR	18	AJ de Klerk
FL	19	Renaldo Bothma
FL	20	Rohan Kitshoff
SH	21	Arthur Bouwer
CE	22	Darryl de la Harpe
CE	23	Heinrich Smit
Coach:
(Wales) Phil Davies

FB	15	Anton Ryabov
RW	14	Andrei Otrokov
OC	13	Dimitry Gerasimov
IC	12	Vladimir Rudenko
LW	11	Igor Galinovskiy
FH	10	Yuri Kushnarev
SH	9	Ruslan Yagudin
N8	8	Victor Gresev
OF	7	Pavel Butenko
BF	6	Andrei Temnov (c)
RL	5	Andrei Garbuzov
LL	4	Alexei Panasenko
TP	3	Innokenty Zykov
HK	2	Yevgeny Matveyev
LP	1	Andrey Polivalov
Replacements:
HK	16	Aleksey Volkov
PR	17	Vladimir Podrezov
PR	18	Evgeni Pronenko
FL	19	Dimitri Krotov
FL	20	Danila Chegodaev
SH	21	Alexey Shcherban
CE	22	Evgeny Kolomytsev
WG	23	Andrey Lizogub
Coach:
(Russia) Alexander Pervukhin

Man of the Match:
Theuns Kotzé (Namibia)

Touch judges:
Danie Koen (Namibia)
Coenraad Moolman (Namibia)

== See also ==
- Mid-year rugby union tests
- End-of-year rugby union tests
- 2015 World Rugby Tbilisi Cup
- 2015 World Rugby Nations Cup
- 2015 World Rugby Pacific Nations Cup
- 2015 Asian Rugby Championship
- 2015 Rugby World Cup warm-up matches
- 2015 Rugby World Cup
- 2015 end-of-year rugby union internationals
