= 2021 Fiji rugby union tour of New Zealand =

- Date: 10–17 July 2021
- Coach: Vern Cotter
- Tour captains: Levani Botia; Leone Nakarawa
- Test series winners: New Zealand (2–0)
- Top test point scorer: Ben Volavola (14)
- Top test try scorers: Mesu Kunavula (1); Peni Ravai (1); Albert Tuisue (1)
Summary
P	W	D	L
Total
2	0	0	2
Test match
2	0	0	2
Opponent
P	W	D	L
New Zealand
2	0	0	2

Tour chronology
- ← 2018 Great Britain, France 2022 Europe →

The 2021 Fiji rugby union tour of New Zealand (Māori: Te haerenga o te tīma whutupaoro uniana o Whītī ki Aotearoa i te tau 2021; Fijian: Lakovi Aotearoa ni timi ni rakavi ni Viti ena yabaki 2021), widely known as the 2021 Steinlager Series in New Zealand for sponsorship reasons, was a two-Test tour of New Zealand by the Fiji national rugby union team during the July international window. The tour kicked off on 10 July during the COVID-19 pandemic in New Zealand, and finished on 17 July following New Zealand's successive victory to finish the tour with a 2–0 whitewash.

It was Fiji's first tour of New Zealand since 2003 (17 years, 11 months) and their first sole tour of the country since 1997 (24 years).

== Background ==
In June 2021, ahead of the scheduled Fijian tour, a New Zealand Gazette notice issued by the Minister for COVID-19 Response Chris Hipkins, taken with the advice of the Director-General of Health Ashley Bloomfield, granted the Fijian rugby team an exemption from some requirements under the COVID-19 Public Health Response (Isolation and Quarantine) Order 2020. At the time, most people entering New Zealand had to complete managed isolation and quarantine (MIQ) to help prevent the spread of COVID-19. The exemption allowed the team to enter New Zealand under strict alternative health measures instead of following the standard MIQ rules. These measures included COVID-19 testing, restricted movement, and close monitoring to minimise the risk of transmission. The exemption began on the night of 11 July and expired on 18 July.

Prior to the tour, Fiji had played just one Test match since the 2019 Rugby World Cup (1 year and 274 days): a 38–24 victory against Georgia in the Autumn Nations Cup played at Murrayfield Stadium in Scotland in December 2020. They had one Test match confirmed against Australia on 18 July 2020, to take place during the 2020 July Test window. However, due to the impacts of COVID-19, all Test matches in this period were postponed by World Rugby, and later cancelled.

New Zealand had played two Tests against Australia in October 2020 in their lead up to the 2020 Tri Nations Series, which saw them play a further four matches, followed by a one-off Test against Tonga in Auckland.

== Schedule ==
Date and time	Venue	Home	Score	Away
10 July; 19:05 NZST (UTC+12)	Forsyth Barr Stadium, Dunedin	New Zealand	57–23	Fiji
17 July; 19:05 NZST (UTC+12)	Waikato Stadium, Hamilton	New Zealand	60–13	Fiji

== Venues ==
The tour and venues were confirmed in May 2021, with Forsyth Barr Stadium in Dunedin and Hamilton's Waikato Stadium being announced. It was also reported that Italy had been originally planned to tour New Zealand but cancelled due to concerns around travelling during the COVID-19 pandemic.

Dunedin	2021 Fiji rugby union tour of New Zealand is located in New Zealand
Forsyth Barr Stadium	2021 Fiji rugby union tour of New Zealand is located in New Zealand
Capacity: 30,748	2021 Fiji rugby union tour of New Zealand is located in New Zealand
Hamilton	2021 Fiji rugby union tour of New Zealand is located in New Zealand
Waikato Stadium	2021 Fiji rugby union tour of New Zealand is located in New Zealand
Capacity: 25,800	2021 Fiji rugby union tour of New Zealand is located in New Zealand

== Squads ==
=== Fiji ===
On 15 June 2021, a 33-man squad was named for tour of New Zealand.

Player	Position	Date of birth (age)	Caps	Club/province
Mesu Dolokoto	Hooker	21 January 1995 (aged 26)	9	(Scotland) Glasgow Warriors
Sam Matavesi	Hooker	13 January 1992 (aged 29)	14	(England) Northampton Saints
Peniami Narisia	Hooker	10 June 1997 (aged 24)	0	(France) Brive
Lee Roy Atalifo	Prop	10 May 1988 (aged 33)	12	(Scotland) Edinburgh
Mesake Doge	Prop	4 January 1993 (aged 28)	2	(France) Brive
Haereiti Hetet	Prop	10 July 1997 (aged 24)	1	(New Zealand) Bay of Plenty
Eroni Mawi	Prop	2 June 1996 (aged 25)	13	(England) Saracens
Peni Ravai	Prop	16 June 1990 (aged 31)	33	(France) Clermont
Luke Tagi	Prop	23 June 1997 (aged 24)	1	(France) Stade Français Paris
Temo Mayanavanua	Lock	9 November 1997 (aged 23)	1	(France) Lyon
Leone Nakarawa	Lock	2 April 1988 (aged 33)	62	(Scotland) Glasgow Warriors
Tevita Ratuva	Lock	8 May 1995 (aged 26)	7	(Wales) Scarlets
Albert Tuisue	Lock	6 June 1993 (aged 28)	8	(England) London Irish
John Dyer	Back row	6 February 1992 (aged 29)	2	(France) Biarritz
Kitione Kamikamica	Back row	27 April 1996 (aged 25)	0	(France) Brive
Mesulame Kunavula	Back row	31 October 1995 (aged 25)	1	(Scotland) Edinburgh
Peceli Yato	Back row	17 January 1993 (aged 28)	20	(France) Clermont
Simione Kuruvoli	Scrum-half	2 January 1999 (aged 22)	1	(Fiji) Tailevu
Frank Lomani	Scrum-half	18 April 1996 (aged 25)	16	(Australia) Rebels
Moses Sorovi	Scrum-half	15 January 1996 (aged 25)	0	(Australia) Reds
Teti Tela	Fly-half	7 March 1991 (aged 30)	0	(Australia) GPS
Ben Volavola	Fly-half	13 January 1991 (aged 30)	37	(France) Perpignan
Levani Botia	Centre	14 March 1989 (aged 32)	19	(France) La Rochelle
Vilimoni Botitu	Centre	16 June 1998 (aged 23)	0	(France) Castres
Eneriko Buliruarua	Centre	23 January 1997 (aged 24)	0	(France) Brive
Waisea Nayacalevu	Centre	26 June 1990 (aged 31)	21	(France) Stade Français Paris
Onisi Ratave	Centre	6 June 1992 (aged 29)	0	Fiji Sevens
Vinaya Habosi	Wing	30 January 2000 (aged 21)	0	Fiji Sevens
Manasa Mataele	Wing	27 November 1996 (aged 24)	0	(New Zealand) Crusaders
Nemani Nadolo	Wing	31 January 1988 (aged 33)	28	(England) Leicester Tigers
Eroni Sau	Wing	2 May 1990 (aged 31)	3	(Scotland) Edinburgh
Kini Murimurivalu	Fullback	15 May 1989 (aged 32)	31	(England) Leicester Tigers
Seta Tuicuvu	Fullback	7 September 1995 (aged 25)	2	(France) Brive

=== New Zealand ===
New Zealand's 36-man squad for the 2021 Steinlager Series against Tonga and Fiji was announced on 21 June. On 5 July, Samisoni Taukei'aho was called into the squad as injury cover.

Player	Position	Date of birth (age)	Caps	Franchise/province
Asafo Aumua	Hooker	5 March 1997 (aged 24)	2	(New Zealand) Hurricanes / Wellington
Dane Coles	Hooker	10 December 1986 (aged 34)	75	(New Zealand) Hurricanes / Wellington
Samisoni Taukei'aho	Hooker	8 August 1997 (aged 23)	0	(New Zealand) Chiefs / Waikato
Codie Taylor	Hooker	31 March 1991 (aged 30)	56	(New Zealand) Crusaders / Canterbury
George Bower	Prop	28 May 1992 (aged 29)	1	(New Zealand) Crusaders / Otago
Ethan de Groot	Prop	22 July 1998 (aged 22)	0	(New Zealand) Highlanders / Southland
Nepo Laulala	Prop	6 November 1991 (aged 29)	29	(New Zealand) Blues / Counties Manukau
Tyrel Lomax	Prop	16 March 1996 (aged 25)	7	(New Zealand) Hurricanes / Tasman
Angus Ta'avao	Prop	22 March 1990 (aged 31)	15	(New Zealand) Chiefs / Auckland
Karl Tu'inukuafe	Prop	21 February 1993 (aged 28)	18	(New Zealand) Blues / North Harbour
Scott Barrett	Lock	20 November 1993 (aged 27)	41	(New Zealand) Crusaders / Taranaki
Brodie Retallick	Lock	31 May 1991 (aged 30)	81	(Japan) Kobe Steelers / Hawke's Bay
Patrick Tuipulotu	Lock	23 January 1993 (aged 28)	36	(New Zealand) Blues / Auckland
Tupou Vaa'i	Lock	27 January 2000 (aged 21)	4	(New Zealand) Chiefs / Taranaki
Sam Whitelock (c)	Lock	12 October 1988 (aged 32)	123	(New Zealand) Crusaders / Canterbury
Ethan Blackadder	Loose forward	22 March 1995 (aged 26)	1	(New Zealand) Crusaders / Tasman
Shannon Frizell	Loose forward	11 February 1994 (aged 27)	13	(New Zealand) Highlanders / Tasman
Akira Ioane	Loose forward	16 June 1995 (aged 26)	3	(New Zealand) Blues / Auckland
Luke Jacobson	Loose forward	20 April 1997 (aged 24)	3	(New Zealand) Chiefs / Waikato
Dalton Papalii	Loose forward	11 October 1997 (aged 23)	5	(New Zealand) Blues / Counties Manukau
Ardie Savea	Loose forward	14 October 1993 (aged 27)	49	(New Zealand) Hurricanes / Wellington
Hoskins Sotutu	Loose forward	12 July 1998 (aged 22)	5	(New Zealand) Blues / Counties Manukau
Finlay Christie	Half-back	19 September 1995 (aged 25)	1	(New Zealand) Blues / Tasman
Aaron Smith	Half-back	21 November 1988 (aged 32)	97	(New Zealand) Highlanders / Manawatu
Brad Weber	Half-back	17 January 1991 (aged 30)	8	(New Zealand) Chiefs / Hawke's Bay
Beauden Barrett	First five-eighth	27 May 1991 (aged 30)	89	(Japan) Suntory Sungoliath / Taranaki
Richie Mo'unga	First five-eighth	25 May 1994 (aged 27)	23	(New Zealand) Crusaders / Canterbury
Braydon Ennor	Centre	16 July 1997 (aged 23)	1	(New Zealand) Crusaders / Canterbury
David Havili	Centre	23 December 1994 (aged 26)	3	(New Zealand) Crusaders / Tasman
Rieko Ioane	Centre	18 March 1997 (aged 24)	34	(New Zealand) Blues / Auckland
Anton Lienert-Brown	Centre	15 April 1995 (aged 26)	49	(New Zealand) Chiefs / Waikato
Quinn Tupaea	Centre	10 May 1999 (aged 22)	1	(New Zealand) Chiefs / Waikato
George Bridge	Wing	1 April 1995 (aged 26)	11	(New Zealand) Crusaders / Canterbury
Will Jordan	Wing	24 February 1998 (aged 23)	3	(New Zealand) Crusaders / Tasman
Sevu Reece	Wing	13 February 1997 (aged 24)	8	(New Zealand) Crusaders / Tasman
Jordie Barrett	Fullback	17 February 1997 (aged 24)	24	(New Zealand) Hurricanes / Taranaki
Damian McKenzie	Fullback	20 May 1995 (aged 26)	28	(New Zealand) Chiefs / Waikato

== Test series ==
=== First Test ===
10 July 2021
19:05 NZST (UTC+12)

New Zealand	57–23	Fiji
Try: J. Barrett 9' c Havili (2) 18' c', 21' c Bridge 44' m Coles (4) 52' m, 64' c, 73' c, 76' c Jordan 69' m Con: Barrett (6/9) 10', 18', 22', 65', 74', 77'	Report	Try: Tuisue 28' m Kunavula 48' m Penalty try 61'; Pen: Volavola (2/2) 6', 13'

Forsyth Barr Stadium, Dunedin
Attendance: 15,103
Referee: Paul Williams (New Zealand) (Note: Australian match officials Nic Berry, Damon Murphy and Graham Cooper were all appointed for the first Test in Dunedin. However, due to COVID-related travel challenges, the aforementioned officials were replaced with New Zealand's Paul Williams, Mike Fraser, and Jonathan Bredin.)

FB	15	Jordie Barrett				(substituted off) 68'
RW	14	Sevu Reece
OC	13	Rieko Ioane
IC	12	David Havili	(yellow card) 61' to 71'
LW	11	George Bridge		(substituted off) 66'
FH	10	Beauden Barrett		(substituted off) 24'	(substituted on) 34'
SH	9	Aaron Smith (c)		(substituted off) 68'
N8	8	Hoskins Sotutu		(substituted off) 66'
OF	7	Ethan Blackadder
BF	6	Shannon Frizell
RL	5	Brodie Retallick
LL	4	Patrick Tuipulotu		(substituted off) 57'
TP	3	Nepo Laulala		(substituted off) 50'
HK	2	Codie Taylor		(substituted off) 50'
LP	1	George Bower		(substituted off) 50'
Replacements:
HK	16	Dane Coles		(substituted on) 50'
PR	17	Ethan de Groot		(substituted on) 50'
PR	18	Tyrel Lomax		(substituted on) 50'
LK	19	Sam Whitelock		(substituted on) 57'
N8	20	Luke Jacobson		(substituted on) 66'
SH	21	Finlay Christie		(substituted on) 68'
FB	22	Damian McKenzie		(substituted on) 24'	(substituted off) 34'	(substituted on) 68'
WG	23	Will Jordan		(substituted on) 66'
Coach:
Ian Foster

FB	15	Kini Murimurivalu	(yellow card) 52' to 62'	(substituted off) 74'	(substituted on) 77'
RW	14	Eroni Sau			(substituted off) 77'
OC	13	Waisea Nayacalevu
IC	12	Levani Botia (c)
LW	11	Nemani Nadolo		(substituted off) 44'
FH	10	Ben Volavola
SH	9	Simione Kuruvoli		(substituted off) 52'
N8	8	Albert Tuisue
OF	7	Mesulame Kunavula		(substituted off) 54'
BF	6	John Dyer
RL	5	Leone Nakarawa
LL	4	Temo Mayanavanua		(substituted off) 61'
TP	3	Mesake Doge		(substituted off) 61'
HK	2	Samuel Matavesi		(substituted off) 71'
LP	1	Peni Ravai		(substituted off) 52'
Replacements:
HK	16	Peniami Narisia		(substituted on) 71'
PR	17	Haereiti Hetet		(substituted on) 52'
PR	18	Lee Roy Atalifo		(substituted on) 61'
LK	19	Tevita Ratuva		(substituted on) 61'
FL	20	Peceli Yato		(substituted on) 54'
FB	21	Seta Tuicuvu		(substituted on) 52'
CE	22	Eneriko Buliruarua		(substituted on) 74'
WG	23	Manasa Mataele		(substituted on) 44'
Coach:
Vern Cotter

Assistant referees:
Mike Fraser (New Zealand)
Jono Bredin (New Zealand)
Television match official:
Chris Hart (New Zealand)

Notes:

- Ethan de Groot (New Zealand) and Eneriko Buliruarua, Manasa Mataele and Peniami Narisia (all Fiji) made their international debuts.

=== Second Test ===
17 July 2021
19:05 NZST (UTC+12)

New Zealand	60–13	Fiji
Try: Reece (3) 15' c, 31' c, 36' m Savea 40' c Jordan 42' c R. Ioane 49' c Taukei'aho (2) 59' m, 80' c Frizell 68' c Con: Mo'unga (5/6) 15', 33', 40', 42', 51'; B. Barrett (2/3) 69', 80'; Pen: Mo'unga (1/1) 29'	Report	Try: Ravai 44' c Con: Volavola (1/1) 46'; Pen: Volavola (2/2) 5', 18'

Waikato Stadium, Hamilton
Attendance: 25,800
Referee: Damon Murphy (Australia) (Note: Replaces Angus Gardner after failing to recover from injury sustained in early 2021.)

FB	15	Damian McKenzie
RW	14	Will Jordan	(substituted off) 43'
OC	13	Anton Lienert-Brown
IC	12	David Havili
LW	11	Sevu Reece
FH	10	Richie Mo'unga	(substituted off) 58'
SH	9	Aaron Smith	(substituted off) 64'
N8	8	Luke Jacobson
OF	7	Ardie Savea
BF	6	Akira Ioane	(substituted off) 67'
RL	5	Sam Whitelock (c)
LL	4	Scott Barrett	(substituted off) 55'
TP	3	Nepo Laulala	(substituted off) 50'
HK	2	Codie Taylor	(substituted off) 55'
LP	1	George Bower	(substituted off) 50'
Replacements:
HK	16	Samisoni Taukei'aho	(substituted on) 55'
PR	17	Ethan de Groot	(substituted on) 50'
PR	18	Angus Ta'avao	(substituted on) 50'
LK	19	Brodie Retallick	(substituted on) 55'
FL	20	Shannon Frizell	(substituted on) 67'
SH	21	Brad Weber	(substituted on) 64'
FH	22	Beauden Barrett	(substituted on) 58'
CE	23	Rieko Ioane	(substituted on) 43'
Coach:
Ian Foster

FB	15	Kini Murimurivalu		(substituted off) 64'
RW	14	Seta Tuicuvu
OC	13	Waisea Nayacalevu
IC	12	Eneriko Buliruarua
LW	11	Nemani Nadolo		(substituted off) 55'
FH	10	Ben Volavola		(substituted off) 74'
SH	9	Frank Lomani
N8	8	Peceli Yato		(substituted off) 64'	(substituted on) 71'
OF	7	Mesulame Kunavula			(substituted off) 71'
BF	6	John Dyer		(substituted off) 42'
RL	5	Leone Nakarawa (c)	(yellow card) 37' to 47'
LL	4	Temo Mayanavanua
TP	3	Mesake Doge		(substituted off) 60'
HK	2	Sam Matavesi		(substituted off) 69'
LP	1	Peni Ravai		(substituted off) 60'
Replacements:
HK	16	Mesu Dolokoto		(substituted on) 69'
PR	17	Eroni Mawi		(substituted on) 60'
PR	18	Lee Roy Atalifo		(substituted on) 60'
LK	19	Albert Tuisue		(substituted on) 42'
FL	20	Kitione Kamikamica		(substituted on) 64'
SH	21	Moses Sorovi		(substituted on) 64'
FH	22	Teti Tela		(substituted on) 74'
WG	23	Manasa Mataele		(substituted on) 55'
Coach:
Vern Cotter

Assistant referees:
Graham Cooper (Australia)
Jordan Way (Australia)
Television match official:
Aaron Patterson (New Zealand)

Notes:

- Dane Coles (New Zealand) was named on the bench but was withdrawn due to injury and replaced by Samisoni Taukei'aho.
- Samisoni Taukei'aho (New Zealand) and Kitione Kamikamica, Moses Sorovi and Teti Tela (all Fiji) made their international debut.
- Ardie Savea and Anton Lienert-Brown (New Zealand) earned their 50th test cap.

== See also ==
- 2021 July Tests
