= Rugby union in Namibia =

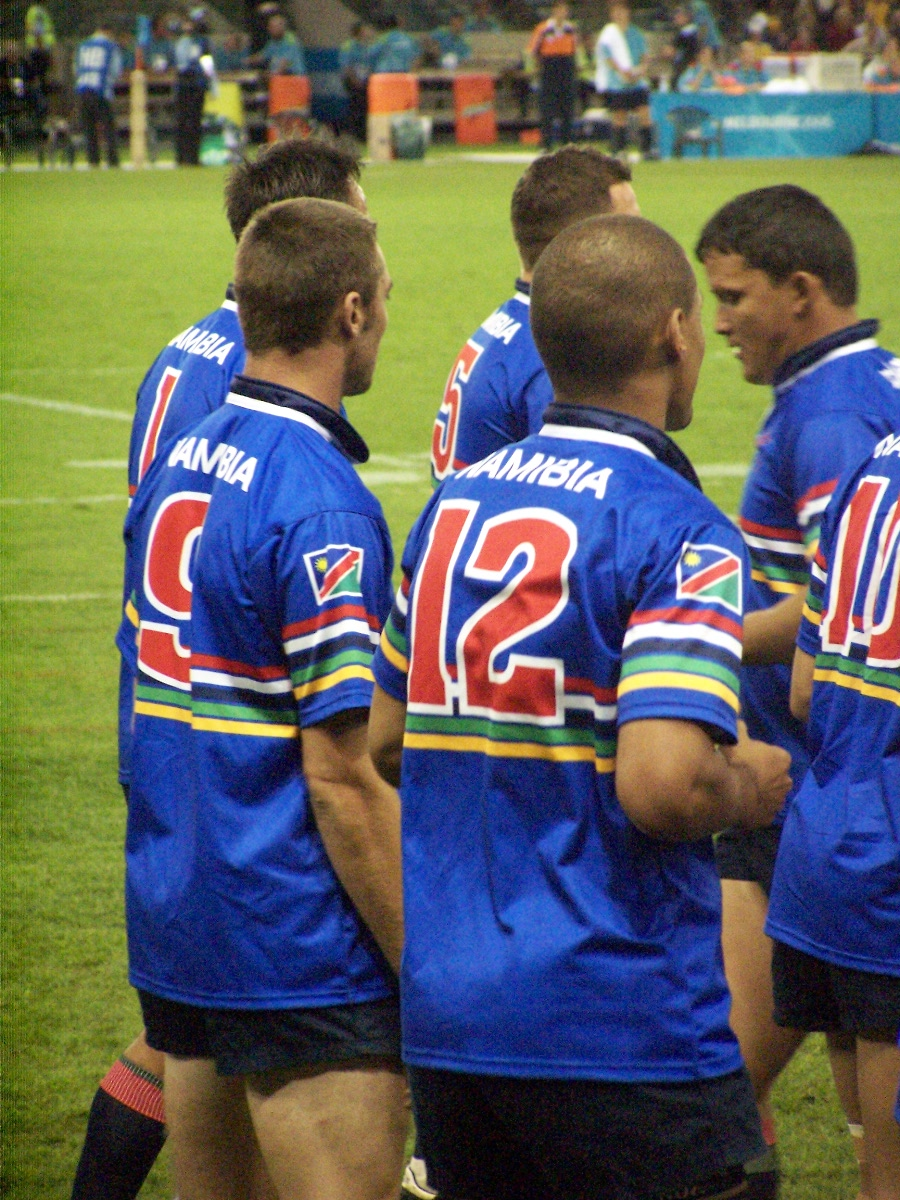
- Namibia Rugby Team 7s team warming up at the Telstra Dome
- Country: Namibia
- Governing body: Namibia Rugby Union
- National team: Namibia
- Nickname: Welwitschias
- First played: 1916
- Registered players: 9317
- Clubs: 36

National competitions
- Rugby World Cup; Africa Cup; Rugby World Cup Sevens; IRB Sevens World Series

Club competitions
- NRU Rugby Domestic League; Rugby Challenge

Rugby union in Namibia is a popular team sport in Namibia and its predecessor province of South West Africa. Because Namibia was formerly ruled by South Africa, rugby in Namibia was frequently influenced by events in that country and its domestic competition.

== Governing body ==
The Namibia Rugby Union is the governing body for rugby union in Namibia. The organisation was formed in March 1990, the same month that it joined the International Rugby Board (IRB).

Before independence in 1990, the governing body was the South African Rugby Board. Earlier bodies operating in South West Africa, from 1916 to 1990, were the South Africa Rugby Football Board (for whites only), founded in 1889 and the South Africa Coloured Rugby Board, founded in 1896.

== History ==
=== Pre-independence ===
In 1915, during World War I, South Africa, being a member of the British Commonwealth and a former British colony, occupied the German colony of South West Africa, later to be known as Namibia.

It is believed that Namibian rugby began in 1916 when it was introduced by migrants from South Africa. Due to this, and Namibia’s long period under South African rule, it can be seen as one of several countries within South African rugby’s sphere of influence, alongside Lesotho, Zimbabwe, Eswatini, and Botswana.

The British and Irish Lions played games in South West Africa on several occasions – in 1962, 1968, 1974, and 1980. Because South West Africa was part of the South African polity, this meant that rugby there was tainted with the image of apartheid, and moreover, the independence of Namibia coincided with the period in which the Lions did not tour Africa, due to the controversy connected with this. When the Lions' tours to SA resumed in 1997, they no longer played games against other African sides, as previously occurred.

From 1966 to 1988, the Namibian War of Independence was in full swing with guerrillas from the nationalist South West Africa People's Organization (SWAPO) and others fighting South African rule.

=== Post-independence ===
Namibia came to international attention in 1991, when they beat the Italian side and defeated the touring Irish in two tests. Phil Matthews' team was beaten 15-6 in the first test, and 26-15 in a match just two months before they started their 1991 Rugby World Cup campaign. For the Irish to be caught unawares was hardly surprising – Namibia had previously languished in the B Division of South Africa's Currie Cup, and only pulled away to become an independent nation in the 1980s. After independence, Namibia had to mostly make do with games against Zimbabwe, most of which they won.

This did not, however, mean a total cessation of international tours to Namibia; for example, Ireland toured Namibia in 1991.

Namibian rugby still bears some similarities to its South African counterpart, using an aggressive, fast-moving game, ideal for their arid conditions. There have been some attempts to remedy this, and the conscious effort to bring in black players has included caps for the likes of Eden Meyer. Big hard forwards such as Johann Barnard are complemented by fast running backs such as Henning Snyman, Gerhard Mans and Andre Snoop (who now plays rugby league in England). It remains to be seen if Namibia can shake off image as a South African satellite.

John Robbie, former captain of Ireland and the British Lions paid tribute to Namibia, saying,

Namibia could never be fancied to win the Currie Cup against big sides such as the Transvaal and Western Province, but none of the top side ever travel to Windhoek expecting anything but the hardest of matches.

The first major hitch in Namibia's rugby ambitions came in the qualifiers for the 1995 Rugby World Cup when they were beaten 13-12 by Côte d'Ivoire, and drew 16-16 with Morocco, which prevented them from entering the tournament. Namibia had rested several key players against Côte d'Ivoire in this game. However, more recently Namibia have been the consistent representatives of Africa beyond South Africa itself.

=== Present ===
As in South Africa, the sport is most popular among Afrikaans speakers, but is also enjoyed by many English-speaking white Namibians. The sport is popular among school children, but the rugby union–playing population in Namibia is still relatively small, with 36 clubs as of 1990.

Being a large, sparsely populated country with limited infrastructure, players often have to travel great distances to reach games. This is a common problem in many African countries, but Namibia has dealt with better than most. Another unusual feature of Namibian rugby is a high proportion of evangelical Christians, who often hold prayer meetings before matches and sometimes refuse to play on Sundays.

== National team ==
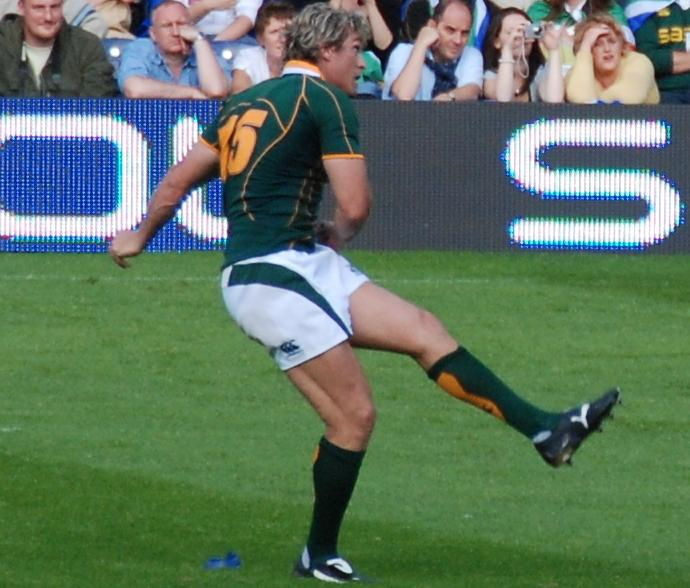
Percy Montgomery, born in Walvis Bay, playing for the Springboks.

The Namibian national team are commonly known as the Welwitschias.

Until independence, players for Namibia were also eligible to represent South Africa; Namibian-born Springboks included Jan Ellis and Percy Montgomery (although in the latter case, his birthplace Walvis Bay was an exclave of South Africa until 1994). Various players pursue their rugby careers in South Africa and in a number of European countries. Frik du Preez, the South African player, also lived in the former South West Africa for a while.

Namibia's players are notable for their other professions. For example:

- Rudi van Vuuren is also a World Cup cricketer for Namibia and a doctor. He is best known for representing his country in both the 2003 Cricket World Cup and the 2003 Rugby Union World Cup; as a result he became the first man to compete in the final stages of world-cup competitions in cricket and rugby union in the same year.
- Schalk van der Merwe also got some press attention as he is a part-time animal tamer and works regularly with lions.
- Bratley Langenhoven, who plays for German champions SC 1880 Frankfurt
- Marius Visser, the heaviest player in the 2007 Rugby World Cup at 140 kilogrammes.

== Domestic competitions ==
=== Currie Cup ===
The Currie Cup tournament is South Africa's premier domestic rugby union competition, featuring teams representing either entire provinces or substantial regions within provinces. Before Namibia gained its independence in 1990, the team, as South West Africa, played in South Africa's Currie Cup competition. Their best result was in 1988, when they finished third. They won the B section Currie Cup in 1987, beating Western Transvaal.

=== South African competitions ===
A Namibian team called the Welwitschias also participated in several seasons of South African domestic rugby. It entered the Vodacom Cup in 2010, 2011 and 2015. The Vodacom Cup is a second-tier competition primarily used for developmental purposes, which runs alongside the Super Rugby season and involves all 14 South African provincial unions, with some invitational teams from other countries, such as the Pampas XV from Argentina and Simba XV from Kenya.

After the demise of the competition after the 2015 season, the Welwitschias participated in the First Division of the Currie Cup competition, as well as the replacement competition for the Vodacom Cup, the Rugby Challenge, launched in 2017. However, prior to the 2018 Currie Cup First Division, a lot of teams were struggling financially. The Welwitschias were informed that they would have to pay the travel costs for teams travelling to games in Windhoek, but — after initial reports indicated that they raised the money with the help of World Rugby — they could not raise the required funds and announced their withdrawal from the competition.

=== NRU Premier League ===
The NRU Premier League is Namibia's national rugby league and is contested by nine sides from all over Namibia. The current NRU Domestic League teams are:

- FNB Wanderers R.F.C
- FNB Western Suburbs R.C
- FNB Kudus R.C
- FNB Reho Falcon R.C
- FNB Rehoboth R.C
- Trustco United R.F.C
- FNB Grootfontein R.C
- FNB UNAM R.C
- Dolphin R.C

=== NRU Reserve League ===
- FNB Wanderers 2 R.F.C
- FNB Western Suburbs 2 R.C
- FNB Kudus 2 R.C
- FNB Reho Falcon 2 R.C
- FNB Rehoboth 2 R.C
- Trustco United 2 R.F.C
- FNB Grootfontein 2 R.C
- FNB UNAM 2 R.C
- Dolphin 2 R.C

=== First Division - Central ===
- Vipers R.C
- Mariental R.C
- Okahandja Highlanders R.C
- NUST R.C

=== First Division - North/West ===
- Sparta 1 R.C
- Kudus 3 R.C
- Etosha R.C
- Sparta 2 R.C

=== First Division - South ===
- Ocean Swallows R.C
- Oranjemund R.C
- Keetmanshoop Rams R.C
- Rosh Pinah Arende R.C

=== NRU Women's Premier League ===
- Wanderers W.R.C
- Unam W.R.C
- United W.R.C
- Kudus W.R.C
- Oceans Rugby W.R.C
- Rehoboth W.R.C
- Grootfontein W.R.C

== International competitions ==
=== Rugby World Cup ===
Namibia has made the World Cup on seven occasions, in 1999, 2003, 2007, 2011, 2015, 2019, and 2023 but has never won a game. In August 2018, the Welwitchias qualified for their sixth Rugby World Cup by defeating Kenya 53-28 in Windhoek. They competed in Pool B for the 2019 World Cup in Japan and drew a match against Canada to finish fourth in the group.

== Rugby union stadiums in Namibia ==
Stadium	Capacity	City	Tenants	Image
Hage Geingob Rugby Stadium	10,000	Windhoek	Namibian national rugby union team Welwitschias	

== See also ==
- Hage Geingob Rugby Stadium
- Namibia national rugby union team
- Namibia Rugby Union
- Welwitschias
- Lists of stadiums

== Sources ==
- Bath, Richard, ed. (1997). The Complete Book of Rugby. Seven Oaks Ltd. ISBN 1-86200-013-1.
- Richards, Huw (2007). "Chapter 14: Journeys without Maps". A Game for Hooligans: The History of Rugby Union. Edinburgh: Mainstream Publishing. ISBN 978-1-84596-255-5.
