= Gerhard Mans (rugby union) =

Namibian rugby union footballer (1962–2022)

- Born: Gerhard Mans; 19 April 1962 Karasburg, South West Africa (now Namibia)
- Died: 4 May 2022 (aged 60) Windhoek, Namibia
- Height: 1.70 m (5 ft 7 in)
- Weight: 82 kg (181 lb)
- School: Wennie du Plessis, Gobabis
- University: University of the Free State

Rugby union career
Provincial / State sides
Years	Team	Apps	(Points)
1982–1984	Orange Free State	24	
1985–1989	South West Africa		
International career
Years	Team	Apps	(Points)
1990–1994	Namibia	27	(114)

Gerhard Mans (19 April 1962 – 4 May 2022) was a Namibian rugby union player. He was the father of Gerhard Mans, who represented Namibia in cycling.

== Playing career ==
Born in Karasburg, a small town in southern South West Africa (now Namibia), Mans attended school in Gobabis and after school moved to Bloemfontein, South Africa for tertiary studies at the University of the Orange Free State.

He made his senior provincial debut in South Africa for the Orange Free State in 1982 and in 1985 returned to his home country. At the time South West Africa participated in the South African domestic rugby competitions. In 1987 Mans was appointed captain of South West Africa and under his leadership during 1987, South West Africa won the B division of the Currie Cup and gained promotion to the A division for the 1988 season.

In 1990, Namibia gained independence and consequently withdrew from the South African rugby competitions. Mans was selected as captain for the first Namibian national side after independence. Namibia played its first test match on 24 March 1990 in Windhoek against Zimbabwe and Mans scored one of his team's six tries in a 33–18 victory. In his second test, against Portugal, he scored a record six tries. Mans continued to play 27 test matches and scored 26 tries for Namibia and also captained the team 26 times. The only occasion that he did not captain the team, was during the 1995 World Cup qualifying final group stages against the Ivory Coast, when he played as a replacement and the team was captained by Henning Snyman. Mans retired at the end of the 1994 season, after Namibia failed to qualify for the 1995 World Cup.

=== Test history ===
No.	Opposition	Result (NAM 1st)	Position	Tries	Date	Venue
1.	Zimbabwe	33–18	Wing (c)	1	24 March 1990	South West Stadium, Windhoek
2.	Portugal	86–9	Wing (c)	6	21 April 1990	South West Stadium, Windhoek
3.	Wales	9–18	Wing (c)	1	2 June 1990	South West Stadium, Windhoek
4.	Wales	30–34	Wing (c)	1	9 June 1990	South West Stadium, Windhoek
5.	France XV	15–24	Wing (c)		23 June 1990	South West Stadium, Windhoek
6.	Spain	36–6	Wing (c)	2	18 May 1991	Campo Universitaria, Madrid
7.	Portugal	34–12	Wing (c)	1	24 May 1991	Universitario Lisboa, Lisbon
8.	Italy	17–7	Wing (c)	1	15 June 1991	South West Stadium, Windhoek
9.	Italy	33–19	Wing (c)	1	22 June 1991	South West Stadium, Windhoek
10.	Zimbabwe	34–15	Wing (c)		29 June 1991	South West Stadium, Windhoek
11.	Zimbabwe	53–9	Wing (c)		6 July 1991	South West Stadium, Windhoek
12.	Ireland	15–6	Wing (c)	1	20 July 1991	South West Stadium, Windhoek
13.	Ireland	26–15	Wing (c)	1	27 July 1991	South West Stadium, Windhoek
14.	Zimbabwe	22–19	Wing (c)		3 August 1991	Police Grounds, Harare
15.	Zimbabwe	23–16	Fullback (c)		10 August 1991	Police Grounds, Harare
16.	Zimbabwe	46–20	Fullback (c)	1	7 September 1991	South West Stadium, Windhoek
17.	Zimbabwe	55–23	Wing (c)	2	9 May 1992	South West Stadium, Windhoek
18.	Zimbabwe	69–26	Wing (c)	1	16 May 1992	South West Stadium, Windhoek
19.	Wales	23–38	Wing (c)		5 June 1993	South West Stadium, Windhoek
20.	Arabian Gulf	64–20	Wing (c)	3	3 July 1993	RFUEA Ground, Nairobi
21.	Kenya	60–9	Wing (c)	1	7 July 1993	RFUEA Ground, Nairobi
22.	Zimbabwe	41–16	Wing (c)	3	10 July 1993	RFUEA Ground, Nairobi
23.	Russia	12–31	Wing (c)		19 March 1994	South West Stadium, Windhoek
24.	Zimbabwe	25–20	Wing (c)		14 June 1994	COC Stadium, Casablanca
25.	Ivory Coast	12–13	Replacement		16 June 1994	COC Stadium, Casablanca
26.	Morocco	16–16	Fullback (c)		18 June 1994	COC Stadium, Casablanca
27.	Hong Kong	22–12	Wing (c)		24 August 1994	South West Stadium, Windhoek

== Accolades ==
Mans was one of the five nominees for 1988 SA Rugby player of the Year award. The other nominees for the award were Adolf Malan, Calla Scholtz, Tiaan Strauss and the eventual winner of the award, Naas Botha.
