= Ben Volavola =

Fiji international rugby union player

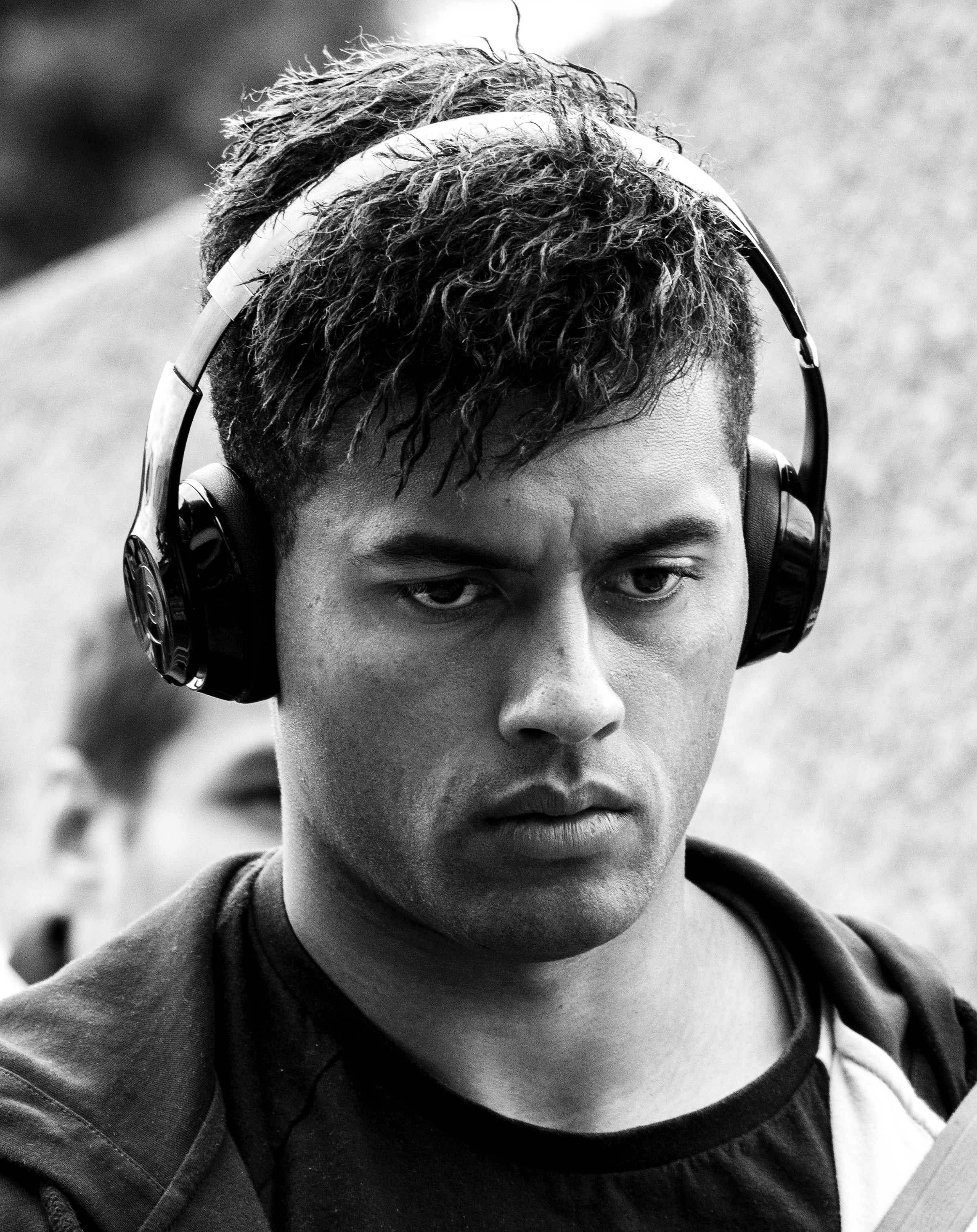
- Volavola in 2019.
- Full name: Ben Thomas Tuvula Volavola
- Born: 13 January 1991 (age 35) Sydney, Australia
- Height: 191 cm (6 ft 3 in)
- Weight: 91 kg (201 lb)
- School: Endeavour Sports High School; Newington College; ACPE
- Notable relative: Peni Volavola (grandfather)

Rugby union career
Amateur team(s)
Years	Team	Apps	(Points)
2012–2015	Southern Districts	36	(248)
Senior career
Years	Team	Apps	(Points)
2014	Greater Sydney Rams	8	(72)
2017–2018	Bordeaux Bègles	14	(13)
2018–2020	Racing 92	36	(26)
2020–2021	Perpignan	17	(128)
2021–2023	Racing 92	22	(16)
2023–2024	Agen	12	(17)
2024–2025	Leicester Tigers	10	(25)
- Correct as of 25 June 2025
Provincial / State sides
Years	Team	Apps	(Points)
2016	Canterbury	7	(11)
2017	North Harbour	10	(58)
Super Rugby
Years	Team	Apps	(Points)
2013	NSW Waratahs	8	(10)
2016	Crusaders	7	(11)
2017	Melbourne Rebels	10	(10)
2026	Queensland Reds	7	(7)
- Correct as of 6 June 2026
International career
Years	Team	Apps	(Points)
2011	Australia U20	5	(37)
2015–	Fiji	38	(239)

Ben Volavola (born 13 January 1991) is a Fijian Australian international rugby union player. He currently plays for the Queensland Reds in the Super Rugby Pacific competition. He has previously played for Leicester Tigers in England's Premiership Rugby, Agen in the French Pro D2 competition; for Bordeaux Bègles, Racing 92 and Perpignan in the Top 14; as well as Super Rugby clubs including the Waratahs, Crusaders, and the Rebels. Volavola typically plays as either a fly-half or full back.

== Early life ==
Volavola was born in Sydney. He moved to Fiji with his Fijian parents at one-years-old and remained in Fiji until he was eight-years-old, returning to Sydney in 2000 with his mother and younger brother. He is of Fijian descent on his mother's side of the family and Indo-Fijian descent on his father's side. He is the grandson of former Suva Mayor, Ratu Peni Volavola, and of the former Suva netball representative Vasiti Mea Naqova.

Upon his return to Australia, Volavola began secondary schooling at St George Christian School (2004), Endeavour Sports High School (2005–2008) and later Newington College (2009–2010). In 2012, he completed his Certificate III and IV in Fitness at the Australian Institute of Fitness in 2012. He also finished a Business Diploma with the Australian Vocational Training Academy.

== Rugby career ==
=== Super Rugby ===
His performances for Southern Districts in the Shute Shield have earned him a spot in the Waratahs Extended Playing Squad for the 2013 Super Rugby season. He represented Australia Under 20 in the 2011 IRB Junior World Championship in Italy.

Volavola signed for the Crusaders in the 2016 Super Rugby season to replace a number 10 exodus at the Crusaders with Dan Carter, Colin Slade and Tom Taylor who are moving to play rugby in Europe as well as confirming his eligibility to join Fiji for the upcoming 2015 Rugby World Cup. He signed a two-year deal.

After getting picked by Fiji for the upcoming 2015 World Rugby Pacific Nations Cup, he intends to make the 10 jersey which was worn by former Fijian flyhalf, Nicky Little who Volavola regards as one of his heroes. His parents, Dinesh Shankar and Ema Volavola have been supportive of their son's decision to represent Fiji.

He came off the bench against Māori All Blacks on his debut in the 2015 mid-year rugby union internationals as Fiji had given the match, test status.

He started at 10 for Fiji against Tonga in the 2015 World Rugby Pacific Nations Cup scoring 15 points (3 conversions and 3 penalties).

He was named one of Fiji's 31 man squad for the Rugby World Cup 2015 which was hosted in England and Wales. He played all 4 matches, against all three of the biggest teams in Fiji's group; England (lost 35–11), Australia (lost 28–13) and Wales (lost 23–13) and the last against Uruguay where Fiji won 45–17.

In January 2017, he signed for Australian Super Rugby side, Melbourne Rebels. He played for one season before leaving the club.

=== Europe ===
In October 2017, after playing all of his professional career in the Super Rugby, NRC, and Mitre 10 Cup Volavola signed for French Top 14 club Bordeaux Bègles. Confirmation was released in November 2017. He joined Fijian teammate Peni Ravai.

In June 2018, Volavola signed for his 2nd French club, Racing 92 as a backup to injured playmaker Pat Lambie.

On 10 May 2020, Volavola sign for Pro D2 side Perpignan ahead of the 2020–21 season.

On 26 August 2024, Volavola was signed by Leicester Tigers in England's Premiership Rugby. He departed after one season and making 10 appearances.

=== Return to Super Rugby Pacific ===
On 3 November 2025, it was confirmed that Volavola would return to Australia to sign for Queensland Reds for the 2026 Super Rugby Pacific season.

== Super Rugby statistics ==
As of 6 November 2017

Season	Team	Games	Starts	Sub	Mins	Tries	Cons	Pens	Drops	Points	Yel	Red
2013	Waratahs	12	1	7	237	2	0	0	0	10	0	0
2014	Waratahs	0	0	0	0	0	0	0	0	0	0	0
2015	Waratahs	0	0	0	0	0	0	0	0	0	0	0
2016	Crusaders	8	2	5	295	1	3	0	0	11	0	0
2017	Rebels	11	7	3	570	0	2	2	0	10	0	0
Total		25	10	15	1102	3	5	2	0	31	0	0

== Personal life ==
In October 2017, Volavola was seen with actress Shailene Woodley on multiple occasions. The duo later posted several photos of each other on social media, confirming their relationship, and in January 2018, Woodley posted a picture of Volavola saying "damn I love him". In April 2020, it was reported that the relationship with Woodley had ended. He married Kristine Phipps on June 24, 2022, at Sydney, Australia. They have a son born in 2023.
