= Arthur Bouwer =

South African-born Namibian rugby union player

- Full name: Arthur Christo Bouwer
- Born: 5 December 1989 (age 36) Sasolburg, South Africa
- Height: 1.77 m (5 ft 9 1/2 in)
- Weight: 86 kg (13 st 8 lb; 190 lb)
- School: HTS Windhoek

Rugby union career
- Position: Scrum-half
Senior career
Years	Team	Apps	(Points)
2015–2016	Welwitschias	11	(0)
- Correct as of 1 December 2016
International career
Years	Team	Apps	(Points)
2012–2016	Namibia	15	(5)
- Correct as of 1 December 2016

Arthur Christo Bouwer (born 5 December 1989) is a South African-born Namibian rugby union player, that played international rugby for the Namibia national team between 2012 and 2016. He also played for the Welwitschias in the South African Vodacom Cup and Currie Cup competitions. He usually played as a scrum-half.

== Rugby career ==
Bouwer was born in Sasolburg in South Africa, but grew up in Windhoek. He made his test debut for Namibia in July 2012 against Senegal in Madagascar, and quickly established himself as a regular for the national team, making 15 appearances over the next four years.

He also represented the Welwitschias in the South African domestic Vodacom Cup and Currie Cup competitions in 2015 and 2016, making eleven appearances.

In June 2016, he represented Namibia at the 2016 World Rugby Nations Cup in Bucharest, where he tested positively for banned substance chlorodehydromethyltestosterone. World Rugby imposed a four-year ban on Bouwer, ruling him out of action until 11 July 2020.
