= Mesu Kunavula =

Fijian rugby union player (born 1995)

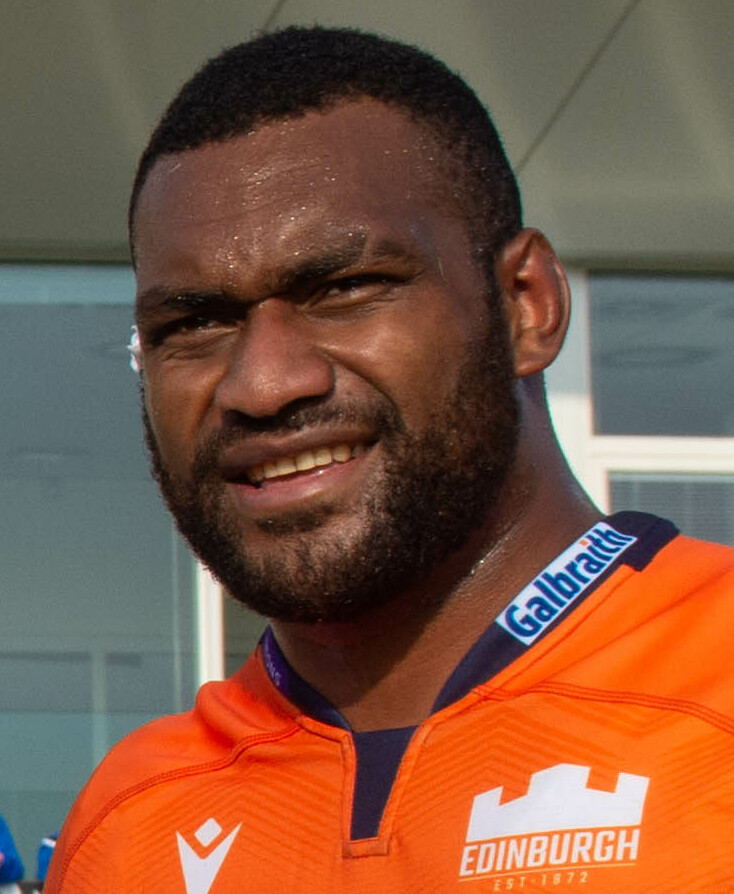
- Full name: Mesulame Kunavula
- Born: 31 October 1995 (age 31) Nadroumai, Nadroga, Fiji
- Height: 195 cm (6 ft 5 in)
- Weight: 125 kg (276 lb; 19 st 10 lb)
- Notable relative: Waisake Naholo (cousin)

Rugby union career
- Position(s): Flanker, Lock
- Current team: Waratahs
Senior career
Years	Team	Apps	(Points)
2019–2022	Edinburgh Rugby	23	(5)
2022–2023	Brive	10	(5)
2024-	Waratahs	0	(0)
- Correct as of 15 November 2023
International career
Years	Team	Apps	(Points)
2020–2021	Fiji	8	(15)
- Correct as of 15 November 2023
National sevens team
Years	Team		Comps
2015–2019	Fiji 7s		23 (144)

Mesu Kunavula (born 31 October 1995) is a Fijian international rugby union player, who currently plays for the NSW Waratahs in Super Rugby. His playing position is lock or flanker.

Kunavula made his debut for the Fiji Rugby 7s team at the 2016 Dubai Rugby Sevens Tournament and is a silver medalist at the 2018 Commonwealth Games.

In 2019 he signed a contract with Edinburgh. In January 2022 he extended his contract with Edinburgh.
