= 1997 Fiji rugby union tour of New Zealand =

Summary
P	W	D	L
Total
6	3	0	3
Test match
1	0	0	1
Opponent
P	W	D	L
New Zealand
1	0	0	1

The 1997 Fiji rugby union tour of New Zealand was a series of matches played in May and June 1997 in New Zealand by Fiji national rugby union team.

== Results ==
Scores and results list Fiji's points tally first.

Opposing Team	For	Against	Date	Venue	Status
South Island Inv. XV	24	31	26 May 1997	Westport	Tour match
Mid-.South Canterbury	55	24	29 May 1997	Timaru	Tour match
Central Vikings	19	10	1 June 1997	Palmerston North	Tour match
Wanganui	28	19	5 June 1997	Wanganui	Tour match
Counties Manukau	20	23	11 June 1997	Pukekohe	Tour match
New Zealand	5	71	14 June 1997	Albany	Test match
