= Joeli Veitayaki Jr. =

Fiji international rugby union player

Joeli Veitayaki
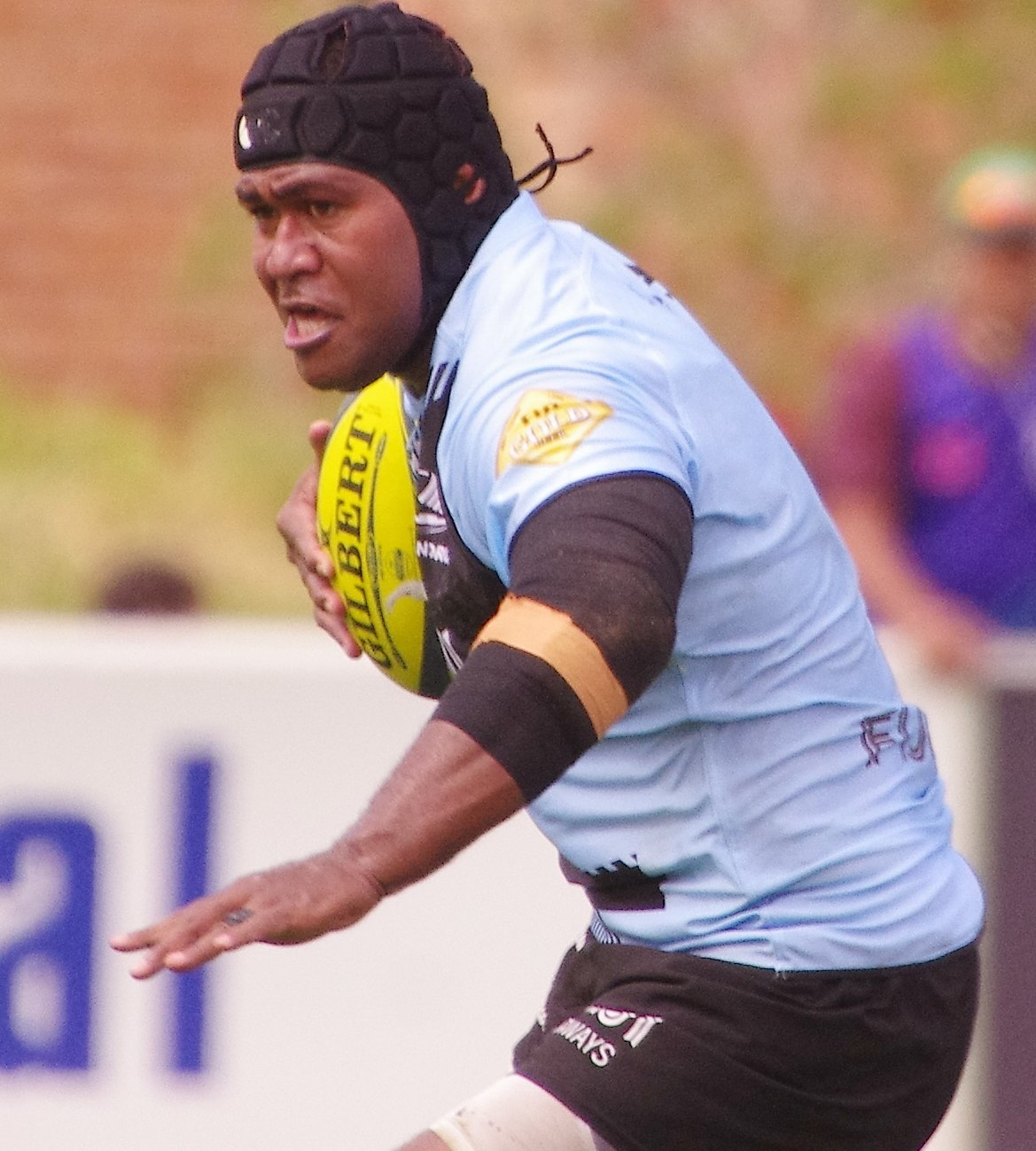
- Veitayaki playing for Drua in 2017
- Full name: Joeli Veitayaki Jr.
- Born: 14 March 1986 (age 40)
- Height: 5 ft 11 in (180 cm)
- Weight: 253 lb (115 kg)
- Notable relative: Pauliasi Tabulutu (uncle)

Rugby union career
- Position: Prop
International career
Years	Team	Apps	(Points)
2016–19	Fiji	7	(0)

Joeli Veitayaki Jr. (born 14 March 1986) is a Fijian former rugby union international.

Veitayaki, a native of Gau Island, is of no relation to the Fiji prop of the same name, but is a nephew of dual-code international Pauliasi Tabulutu. He plays his local rugby for Naitasiri and has been capped seven times for Fiji, all as a substitute. In 2018, he was a member of the Fijian Drua side which won the National Rugby Championship.

== See also ==
- List of Fiji national rugby union players
