= Román Miralles =

Argentine rugby union player (born 1983)

- Born: 1 August 1983 (age 43) Rosario, Argentina
- Height: 6 ft 1 in (185 cm)
- Weight: 172 lb (78 kg)

Rugby union career
- Position: Fullback
International career
Years	Team	Apps	(Points)
2005–15	Argentina	7	(15)

Román Miralles (born 1 August 1983) is an Argentine former international rugby union player.

A product of the Duendes club in Rosario, Miralles was a specialist fullback, known in the rugby world as "Pitu".

Miralles first represented Argentina at Under 21s level and was capped seven times for the Pumas in sporadic appearances between 2005 and 2015. He featured in the Pampas XV that won the 2011 Vodacom Cup. In 2012, Miralles made a Test appearance as the Pumas starting fullback in a win over France in Cordoba.

== See also ==
- List of Argentina national rugby union players
