= Peniami Narisia =

Fijian rugby union player (born 1997)

- Full name: Peniami Nasali Narisia Vuadreu
- Born: 10 June 1997 (age 29) Fiji
- Height: 180 cm (5 ft 11 in)
- Weight: 92 kg (203 lb; 14 st 7 lb)

Rugby union career
- Position: Hooker
- Current team: Brive
Senior career
Years	Team	Apps	(Points)
2015–	Brive	51	(15)
- Correct as of 1 November 2021
International career
Years	Team	Apps	(Points)
2015	Fiji U20	4	(0)
2021–	Fiji	1	(0)
- Correct as of 1 November 2021

Peniami Narisia (born 10 June 1997 in Fiji) is a Fijian rugby union player who plays for Brive in the Top 14. His playing position is hooker. Narisia has played for Brive since 2015. He made his debut for Fiji in 2021 against New Zealand.
