= John Dyer (rugby union) =

Fijian rugby union player (born 1992)

- Full name: John Augustine Fabian Dyer
- Born: 6 February 1992 (age 34) Fiji
- Height: 190 cm (6 ft 3 in)
- Weight: 105 kg (231 lb; 16 st 7 lb)

Rugby union career
- Position: Flanker
- Current team: Biarritz
Senior career
Years	Team	Apps	(Points)
2018–2019	Drua	16	(27)
2019–2020	Racing 92	0	(0)
2020–	Biarritz	85	(50)
- Correct as of 23 January 2024
International career
Years	Team	Apps	(Points)
2016–2019	Fiji Warriors	6	(5)
2019–	Fiji	4	(10)
- Correct as of 1 November 2021

John Dyer (born 6 February 1992 in Fiji) is a Fijian rugby union player who plays for Biarritz in the Top 14. His playing position is flanker. Dyer signed for Biarritz in 2020, having previously represented the Fijian Drua and Racing 92. He made his debut for Fiji in 2019 against the Māori All Blacks.
