= Namibia Rugby Union =

Sports governing body in Namibia

the Welwitschias
- Sport: Rugby union
- Founded: 1990
- World Rugby affiliation: 1990
- CAR affiliation: 1990
- President: Corrie Mensah
- Men's coach: Allister Coetzee

Namibia Rugby Union is the governing body for rugby union in Namibia. It was formed in March 1990, the same month that it joined the International Rugby Board.

== See also ==
- Namibia national rugby union team
- Namibia Sports Commission
