= Hage Geingob Rugby Stadium =

Rugby stadium in Windhoek, Namibia

Hage Geingob Stadium
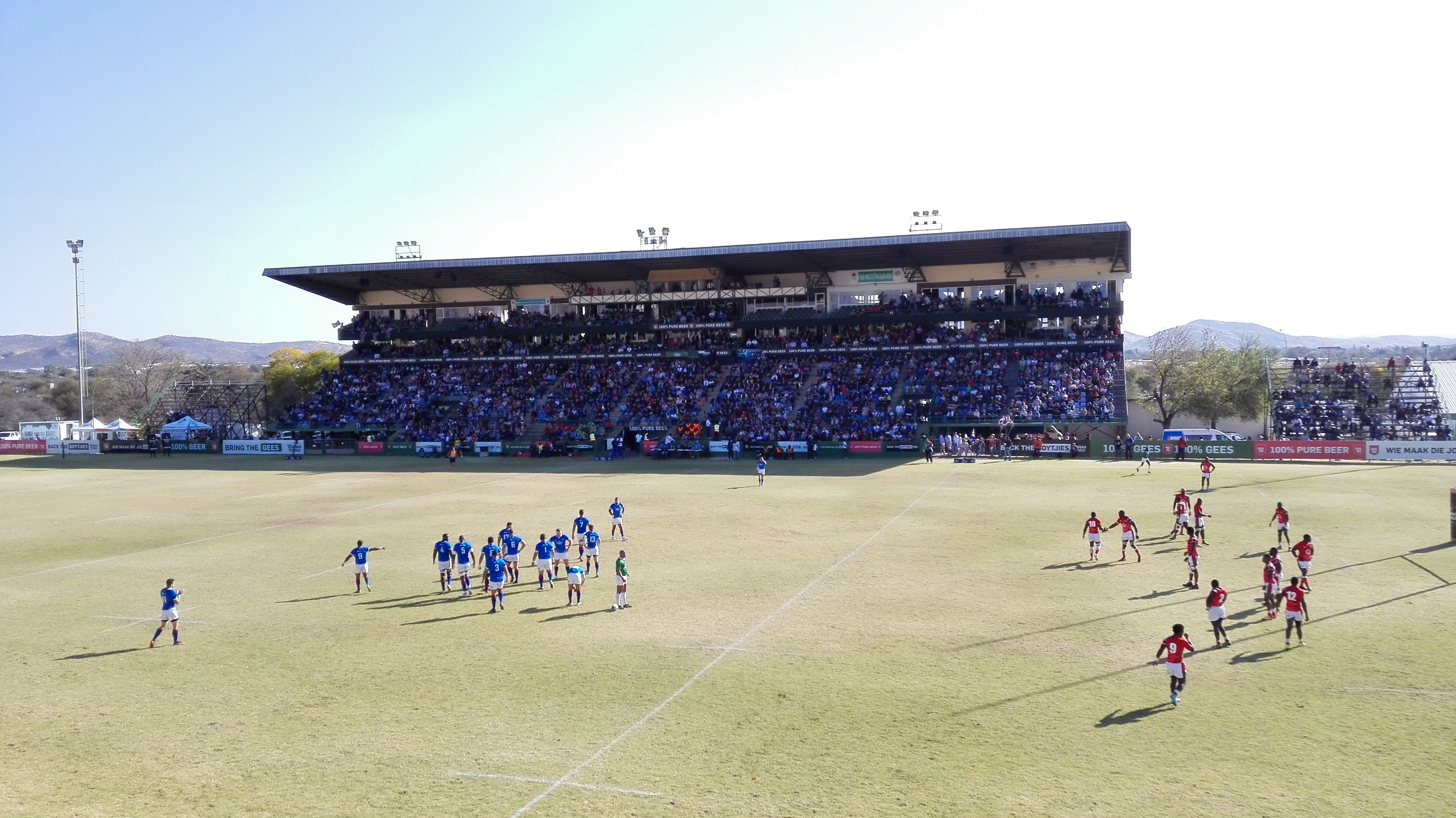
- Main stand of the Hage Geingob Stadium
- Interactive map of Hage Geingob Stadium
- Location: Windhoek, Namibia
- Coordinates: 22°36′27″S 17°05′27″E
- Owner: Namibia Rugby Union
- Operator: Namibia Rugby Union
- Capacity: 10,000
- Surface: Grass

Construction
- Opened: 1991

Tenants
- Namibian national rugby union team Welwitschias

The Hage Geingob Stadium (previously known as the South West Stadium) is a rugby stadium in Windhoek, Namibia. It is named after Hage Geingob, who was President of Namibia from 2015 to 2024. The stadium has a capacity of 10,000. Namibia Rugby Union is the owner and operator of the stadium. A transfer of ownership to the Ministry of Sport, Youth and National Service is planned.

The stadium is commonly used by the Namibian national rugby union team who compete in the Africa Cup, and by the Welwitschias who compete in the Rugby Challenge.
