= Peni Ravai =

Fiji international rugby union player

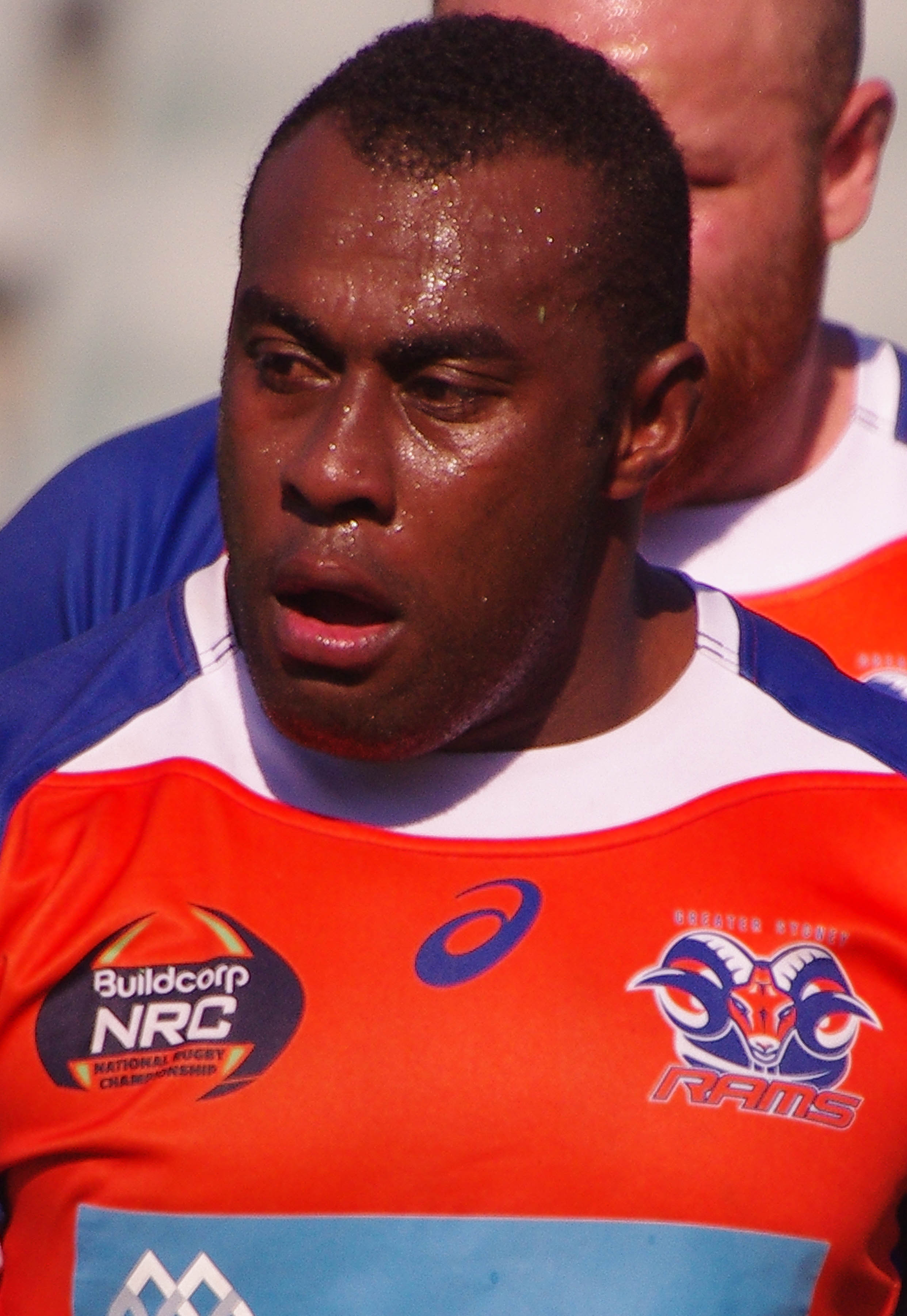
- Ravai representing Greater Sydney Rams in the 2014 National Rugby Championship, October 2014
- Full name: Peni Ravai Kovekalou
- Born: 16 June 1990 (age 36) Verata, Fiji
- Height: 185 cm (6 ft 1 in)
- Weight: 127 kg (280 lb; 20 st 0 lb)
- School: Ratu Kadavulevu School

Rugby union career
- Position: Prop
- Current team: Reds
Senior career
Years	Team	Apps	(Points)
2014	Greater Sydney Rams	4	(0)
2016	Southland	9	(10)
2017	Aurillac	12	(15)
2017–2020	Bordeaux Bègles	43	(50)
2020–2022	Clermont	38	(20)
2023–2024	Reds	27	(15)
- Correct as of 7 June 2024
International career
Years	Team	Apps	(Points)
2013–	Fiji	50	(22)
2016	Fiji Warriors	4	(0)
- Correct as of 31 January 2023
National sevens team
Years	Team		Comps
2013	Fiji		1
- Correct as of 18 July 2021

Peni Ravai Kovekalou (born 16 June 1990) is a Fijian rugby union player, who currently plays at hooker and prop for the Flying Fijians and the Reds in Super Rugby. He previously played for Southland in the Mitre 10 Cup in New Zealand, Aurillac in the Pro D2, and Bordeaux Bègles and Clermont Auvergne in the Top 14. He has also played at centre and on the wings.

== Career ==
Ravai grew up playing rugby in the backline. He played wing and centre. When he made it to provincial level, he started playing in the forwards as there was no place in the backline. He became Nadroga's starting prop and at times played on the flanks as well as in the backline. He has also played 7's rugby for Davetalevu. He joined the Fiji Barbarians team at the Uprising 7's tournament and helped them win the title.

In February 2013, he was selected into the Fiji 7's team to replace the injured Josua Tuisova. He made his international 7's debut at the 2013 USA Sevens. He is also Fiji's first international prop to play international 7's rugby for Fiji.

He was then recruited by Inoke Male, the Fiji 15's coach to join the team on their 2013 end-of-year rugby union internationals. He made his debut off the bench at hooker against Romania.

In August 2014, he was signed by Greater Sydney Rams to join the newly created, National Rugby Championship in Australia. He made his debut at hooker for the RAMS in October.

In May 2015, he was named in the Fiji Warriors team to tour Uruguay in the 2015 mid-year rugby union internationals. He started at Loosehead prop in the first match against Uruguay and kept his place in the starting XV a few days later when the Warriors faced Argentina Jaguars. The Warriors won all their games on tour. He was included in the Fiji side for the 2015 World Rugby Pacific Nations Cup. He came off the bench against the Māori All Blacks in their one-off test. He then came off the bench against Tonga scoring a try in the 73rd minute to seal Fiji a win. He started at Loose-head prop against Samoa a week later. In May 2016, he captained the Fiji Warriors side to a 2 match win against the Uruguay national team during the 2016 mid-year rugby union internationals. The same month he was signed by the Woodlands Rugby Club and would be in the hunt to make the Southland Stags side for the 2016 Mitre 10 Cup.

In July 2016, he was included in the Southland Stags side for the 2016 Mitre 10 Cup. He made his debut against Otago in the first round.

In November 2016, he joined Fiji for the 2016 end-of-year rugby union internationals. He came off the bench against England national rugby union team in the 5th minute after Campese Ma’afu was taken off and gained metres with ball in hand. He then started at loosehead against Japan and played just as well

He signed for Aurillac for the 2016–17 Rugby Pro D2 season playing 12 games and scoring 3 tries and his performance saw him getting signed by Bordeaux-Bègles in the Top 14

He was named in the Fiji team for the 2017 mid-year rugby union internationals as well as the 2017 World Rugby Pacific Nations Cup.

On 23 May 2020, Ravai signs for Top 14 rivals Clermont Auvergne ahead of the 2020–21 season.
