= Namibia national rugby union team =

National rugby union team representing Namibia

Namibia
- Nickname: Welwitschias
- Emblem: African fish eagle
- Union: Namibia Rugby Union
- Director of Rugby: Jacques Burger
- Head coach: Pieter Rossouw
- Captain: Johan Deysel
- Most caps: Eugene Jantjies (70)
- Top scorer: Theuns Kotzé (430)
- Top try scorer: Chrysander Botha (28)
- Home stadium: Hage Geingob Rugby Stadium
First colours	Second colours

World Rugby ranking
- Current: 26 (as of 19 June 2026)
- Highest: 18 (2017)
- Lowest: 29 (2006)

First international
- South West Africa 0–9 British and Irish Lions (Windhoek, Namibia; 5 July 1955)

Biggest win
- Namibia 118–0 Tunisia (Windhoek, Namibia; 23 June 2018)

Biggest defeat
- Australia 142–0 Namibia (Adelaide, Australia; 25 October 2003)

World Cup
- Appearances: 7 (first in 1999)
- Best result: Pool stage (1999, 2003, 2007, 2011, 2015, 2019, 2023)
- Website: nru.com.na

The Namibia national rugby union team (nicknamed the Welwitschias) represents Namibia in men's international rugby union competitions. They are a tier-two nation in the World Rugby tier system, and have participated in seven Rugby World Cup competitions since their first appearance in 1999. They are governed by the Namibia Rugby Union.

Namibia has been playing international rugby since the early 1900s. As well as having competed at the World Cup, Namibia competes annually in the Africa Cup. Until independence, players for Namibia were also eligible to represent South Africa, with Namibian-born Springboks including Jan Ellis.

== History ==
=== 1990s ===
Rugby union has been played in Namibia since 1916 when it was introduced by soldiers from South Africa who had invaded the German-run colony.

Before Namibia gained its independence in 1990, the team, as South West Africa, played in South Africa's domestic club competition, the Currie Cup. The team achieved their best result in the 1988 season, where they finished third.

The Namibia Rugby Union was formed in March 1990, and it joined the International Rugby Board in the same month. Independence came too late for Namibia to qualify for the 1991 Rugby World Cup. Hardened by regular, tough competition in the Currie Cup, the first few years of Namibian rugby union were relatively successful, their highest point being 2–0 home series victories over Ireland and Italy in 1991. That year the Welwitschias won all 10 of their Tests, the others being five victories against Zimbabwe and one against Portugal in Lisbon. One of Namibia's players, Andre Stoop was signed by English champion rugby league club, Wigan.

During the international seasons Namibia played six games; the first of which was a 55–23 win over Zimbabwe. Following another victory over Zimbabwe, in 1993 Namibia played Wales in Windhoek, losing 38–23. Namibia completed big victories over the Arabian Gulf rugby team, Kenya and Zimbabwe in the initial rounds of 1995 Rugby World Cup qualifying.

Russia toured Namibia in 1994, defeating the home team 31–12 in Windhoek. Although Namibia defeated Zimbabwe that year, the team lost to Côte d'Ivoire and drew with Morocco (all in Casablanca). In 1996 Namibia played two matches; losing 15–13 to Zimbabwe, and then defeating them by one point in a subsequent meeting. They played two games in 1997 as well, losing to Tonga and Zimbabwe.

During 1998 Namibia took part in the African tournaments for 1999 Rugby World Cup qualification. They started out in Round 3, where they finished second in the pool behind Zimbabwe on points difference (defeating Zimbabwe but losing to Tunisia). Namibia defeated Côte d'Ivoire, Morocco and Zimbabwe to qualify for the 1999 Rugby World Cup.

The team's participation was put in doubt when the Namibian government's Sports Commission barred the team from participating in a South African competition it had been using as preparation, and threatened to stop the team from taking part in the World Cup. This followed criticisms from non-white rugby clubs that the Namibian Rugby Union displayed racist attitudes. Ultimately, however, the team were allowed to take part.

The 1999 World Cup marked their debut at the tournament and since then they have been Africa's second representative alongside South Africa. While they suffered heavy defeats by France, Fiji and Canada, they took pride in scoring an early try and being level with France after 20 minutes.

=== 2000–present ===
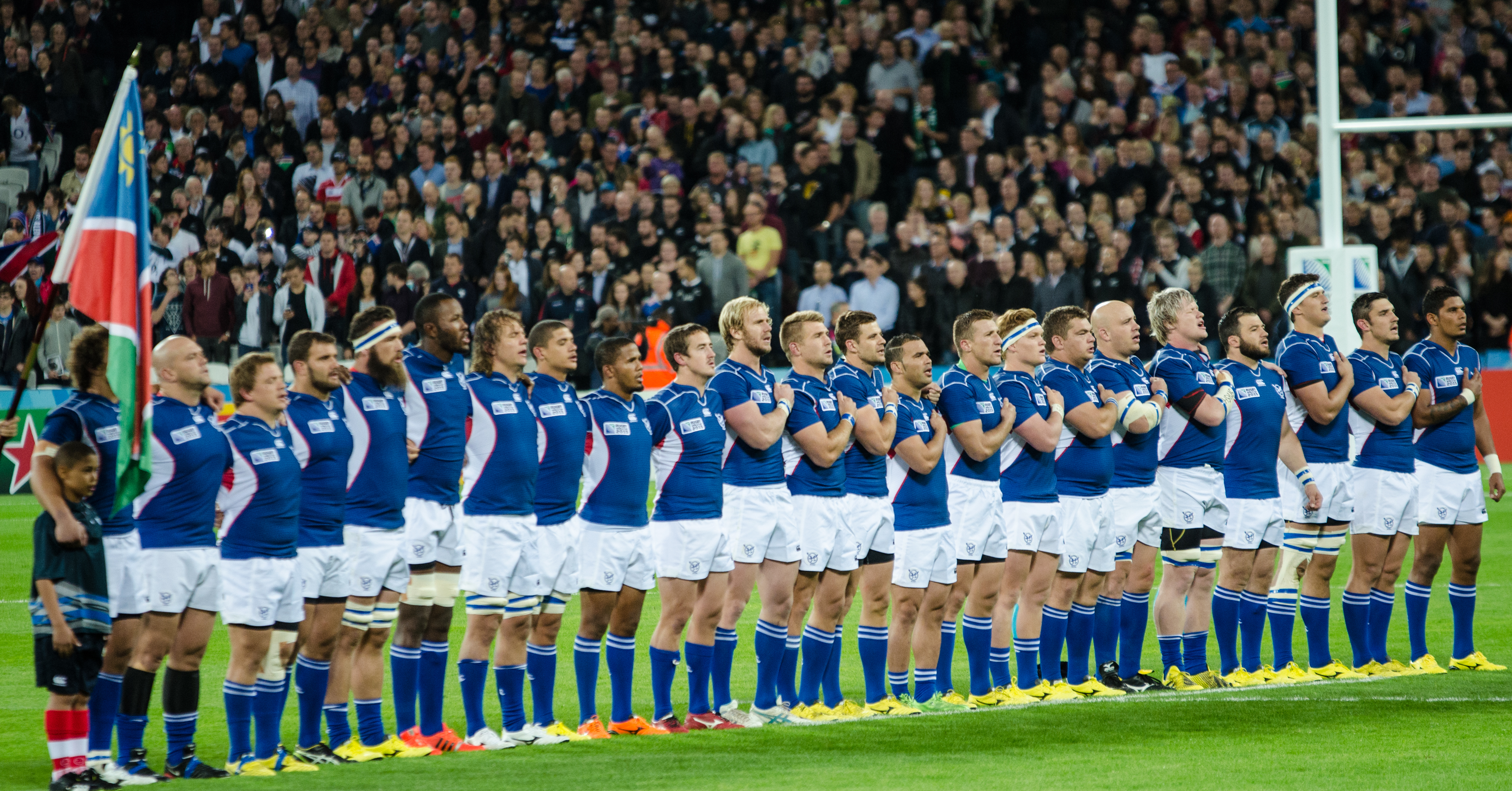
The national rugby union team of Namibia in 2015.

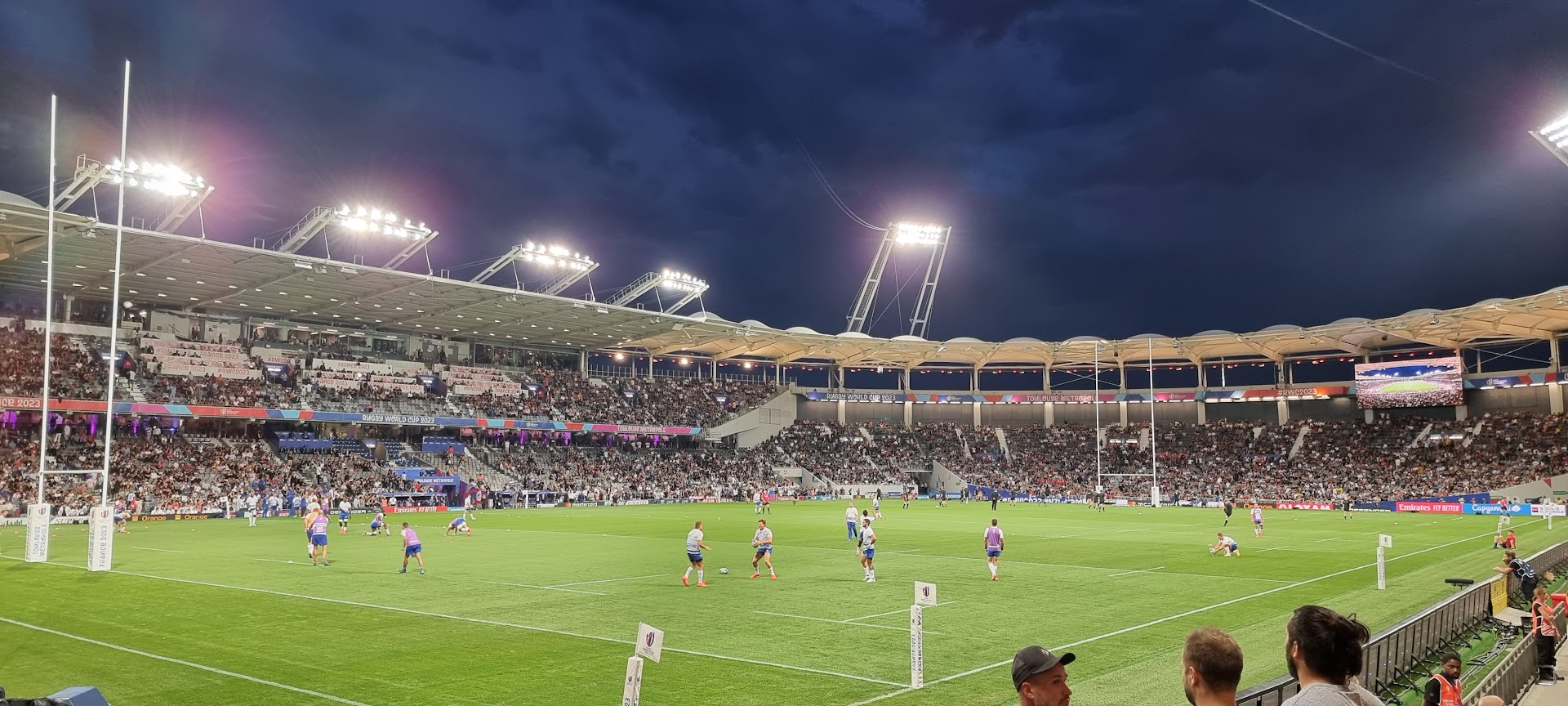
2023 Rugby World Cup match between New Zealand (All Blacks) and Namibia in Toulouse, France.

With a small player base, and lacking frequent or strong competition, the team has deteriorated in the 21st century. Their record in the World Cups has been poor as they have not yet managed a win. Their record defeat, 142–0 against Australia in the 2003 tournament, led to some questioning the presence of the minor teams at the tournament.

Namibia initially struggled in the qualifiers for the 2007 tournament, suffering a shock defeat to Kenya, their first ever to the African Great Lakes nation, and another to Tunisia. Following the Kenya loss, the Namibian squad slumped to 28th in the IRB rankings. However, after defeating Tunisia at home, the team was effectively through to two deciding matches against Morocco, to determine which of the two African nations would make it to France in 2007. Namibia convincingly won both legs, qualifying for the World Cup.

As the lowest ranked team at the start of the 2007 World Cup, Namibia was given no chance in its opening game of against Ireland. However, the Namibian squad frustrated Ireland, then the 5th ranked team in the world, and scored two tries for its narrowest World Cup loss of 32–17. They were convincingly beaten in their games with Argentina (63–3) and France (87–10). And, in the game in which they were seen as having the best chance to win, they suffered a disappointing 30–0 loss to Georgia, to end the tournament winless.

The African side was able to win the IRB Nations Cup in 2010.

Namibia achieved their fourth World Cup qualification in a row after defeating Côte d'Ivoire in 2011. They were drawn into Pool D, with South Africa, Wales, Fiji and Samoa. Their first match in the Rugby World Cup held in New Zealand (at the Rotorua International Stadium) resulted in a defeat by Fiji by 45–29. Their second match in this tournament was a 49–12 loss to Samoa but the third was an 87–0 loss to South Africa. In their final pool game, Wales proved to be too strong, as Namibia conceded 12 tries in an 81–7 defeat. Theuns Kotzé provided his side's one consolation, as his conversion of a Heinz Koll try made him Namibia's all-time highest Rugby World Cup points scorer.

The Welwitschias played the 2015 Vodacom Cup, collecting six defeats and one win against the Limpopo Blue Bulls. Namibia qualified for their fourth Rugby World Cup in 2015. They were placed in Pool C with New Zealand, Georgia, Tonga and Argentina. They managed to lose to Georgia by a single point (17–16), their best result ever and winning their first bonus point at the competition.

They qualified for the 2019 Rugby World Cup for the sixth time by winning the Rugby Africa Gold Cup and joined pool B along with South Africa, New Zealand, Italy and Canada. The team lost to New Zealand, South Africa and Italy, while the match versus Canada was cancelled because of Typhoon Hagibis.

== Wins against Tier 1 nations ==
15 June 1991	Namibia	17–7	Italy	(Namibia) Windhoek

22 June 1991	Namibia	33–19	Italy	(Namibia) Windhoek

20 July 1991	Namibia	15–6	Ireland	(Namibia) Windhoek

27 July 1991	Namibia	26–15	Ireland	(Namibia) Windhoek

== South West Africa Record vs Touring Teams ==
Before independence Namibia played as South West Africa and played touring teams who toured South Africa.

Opponent	Played	Won	Lost	Drawn	Win %	For	Aga	Diff
Australia	3	0	2	1	0.00%	28	71	−43
British and Irish Lions	4	0	4	0	0.00%	22	69	—47
Chile	2	1	1	0	50.00%	66	48	+18
France	2	0	1	1	0.00%	19	48	—29
New Zealand	2	0	2	0	0.00%	3	43	−40
Paraguay	1	1	0	0	100.00%	110	0	+110
Uruguay	1	1	0	0	100.00%	38	22	+16
Southern Rhodesia	6	1	5	0	16.67%	58	136	−78
Total	21	4	15	2	19.05%	344	437	−93

Date	Score	Touring Team	Venue
5 July 1955	0–9	British and Irish Lions	Mabel Vlok Park, Windhoek
11 July 1959	3–19	Southern Rhodesia	Otjiwarongo
8 July 1960	3–27	New Zealand	South West Stadium, Windhoek
27 July 1961	14–14	Australia	South West Stadium, Windhoek
12 June 1962	6–14	British and Irish Lions	South West Stadium, Windhoek
31 July 1963	6–24	Australia	South West Stadium, Windhoek
13 June 1964	15–6	Southern Rhodesia	South West Stadium, Windhoek
13 March 1966	3–19	Southern Rhodesia	Hartsfield Stadium, Bulawayo
15 June 1968	0–23	British and Irish Lions	South West Stadium, Windhoek
21 September 1968	8–34	Southern Rhodesia	South West Stadium, Windhoek
1 September 1969	8–33	Australia	South West Stadium, Windhoek
4 July 1970	0–16	New Zealand	South West Stadium, Windhoek
8 June 1971	6–35	France	South West Stadium, Windhoek
18 May 1974	16–23	British and Irish Lions	South West Stadium, Windhoek
17 June 1975	13–13	France	South West Stadium, Windhoek
7 May 1977	15–22	Southern Rhodesia	South West Stadium, Windhoek
29 October 1983	30–33	Chile	Santiago
5 November 1983	38–22	Uruguay	Montevideo
24 October 1988	36–15	Chile	Santiago
3 November 1988	110–0	Paraguay	Asunción

== Overall record ==
Rugby World Cup record									Qualification						
Year	Round	Pld	W	D	L	PF	PA	Squad	Pos	Pld	W	D	L	PF	PA
(New Zealand) (Australia) 1987	Part of South Africa: Not an independent country								—						
(England) (France) (Ireland) (Scotland) (Wales) 1991	Did not enter								—						
(South Africa) 1995	Did not qualify								2nd	6	4	1	1	218	104
(Wales) 1999	Pool Stage	3	0	0	3	42	186	Squad	1st	5	4	0	1	127	78
(Australia) 2003	Pool Stage	4	0	0	4	28	310	Squad	P/O	4	3	0	1	197	73
(France) 2007	Pool Stage	4	0	0	4	30	212	Squad	P/O	6	4	0	2	190	96
(New Zealand) 2011	Pool Stage	4	0	0	4	44	266	Squad	P/O	6	5	1	0	155	81
(England) 2015	Pool Stage	4	0	0	4	70	174	Squad	1st	7	5	0	2	289	159
(Japan) 2019	Pool Stage	4	0	1	3	34	175	Squad	1st	10	10	0	0	619	133
(France) 2023	Pool Stage	4	0	0	4	37	255	Squad	P/O	5	4	0	1	206	58
(Australia) 2027	Did not qualify								P/O	8	6	0	2	291	169
(United States) 2031	To be determined														
Total	—	27	0	1	26	285	1578	—	—	57	44	2	11	2292	951
Champions; Runners–up; Third place; Fourth place; Home venue

During Typhoon Hagibis; Namibia v Canada was to be cancelled and recorded as 0–0 draw

Men's World Rugby Rankings Top 30 as of 28 September 2026
Rank	Change (Note: Change from the previous week)	Team	Points
1	Steady	South Africa	93.09
2	Steady	New Zealand	91.15
3	Steady	Ireland	88.08
4	Steady	France	87.43
5	Steady	England	85.68
6	▲1	Australia	85.55
7	▼1	Scotland	84.78
8	Steady	Argentina	82.24
9	Steady	Japan	77.28
10	Steady	Fiji	76.81
11	Steady	Wales	76.38
12	Steady	Italy	76.30
13	Steady	Georgia	73.94
14	Steady	Portugal	69.39
15	Steady	United States	67.58
16	Steady	Chile	66.94
17	Steady	Spain	66.83
18	Steady	Uruguay	65.75
19	Steady	Tonga	65.14
20	Steady	Samoa	64.73
21	Steady	Romania	62.45
22	Steady	Canada	62.29
23	Steady	Belgium	61.03
24	Steady	Hong Kong	60.74
25	Steady	Zimbabwe	57.68
26	Steady	Namibia	56.96
27	Steady	Netherlands	56.44
28	Steady	Switzerland	55.47
29	Steady	Czech Republic	54.78
30	Steady	Poland	54.54

Namibia's historical rankings

Source: World Rugby
Graph updated to 24 August 2026

Below is a table of the representative rugby matches played by a Namibia national XV at test level up until 24 October 2026, updated after match with Zimbabwe.

Opponent	Played	Won	Lost	Drawn	Win %	For	Aga	Diff
Algeria	1	1	0	0	100%	21	7	+14
Arabian Gulf	1	1	0	0	100%	64	20	+44
Argentina	3	0	3	0	0%	36	194	−158
Argentina XV	1	0	1	0	0%	27	34	−7
Australia	1	0	1	0	0%	0	142	−142
Belgium	1	0	1	0	0%	15	22	−7
Brazil	1	1	0	0	100%	40	31	+9
Burkina Faso	2	2	0	0	100%	109	10	+99
Canada	3	1	2	0	33.33%	67	126	—59
Chile	1	1	0	0	100%	28	26	+2
Fiji	2	0	2	0	0%	43	116	−73
France	3	0	3	0	0%	23	230	—207
France XV	2	0	2	0	0%	36	49	—13
Georgia	5	1	4	0	20%	73	112	—39
Germany	2	2	0	0	100%	137	33	+104
Hong Kong	1	1	0	0	100%	22	12	+10
Ireland	4	2	2	0	50%	65	117	−52
Italy	6	2	4	0	33.33%	110	247	—137
Italy A	1	0	1	0	0%	21	43	—22
Ivory Coast	6	2	3	1	33.33%	127	98	+29
Kenya	13	11	2	0	84.62%	642	252	+390
Madagascar	5	4	1	0	80%	362	94	+268
Morocco	8	5	2	1	62.5%	196	144	+52
New Zealand	3	0	3	0	0%	26	200	−174
Portugal	9	6	3	0	66.67%	280	185	+95
Romania	6	1	5	0	16.67%	66	158	−92
Russia	7	2	5	0	28.57%	141	183	−42
Samoa	3	0	3	0	0%	33	115	—82
Senegal	5	5	0	0	100%	218	57	+161
South Africa	3	0	3	0	0%	16	249	—233
Spain	7	2	5	0	28.57%	134	174	—40
Tonga	2	0	2	0	0%	35	55	−20
Tunisia	11	8	3	0	72.73%	368	159	+209
Uganda	6	5	1	0	83.33%	266	113	+153
United Arab Emirates	1	1	0	0	100%	86	29	+57
Uruguay	6	1	5	0	16.67%	156	204	−48
Wales	4	0	4	0	0%	69	171	−102
West Germany	1	1	0	0	100%	54	7	+47
Zambia	3	3	0	0	100%	203	32	+171
Zimbabwe	36	30	6	0	83.33%	1,310	773	+537
Total	186	102	82	2	54.84%	5,725	5,023	+702

== Players ==
=== Current squad ===
On 28 October, Namibia named a 30-player squad ahead of the 2027 Rugby World Cup Final Qualification Tournament.

Head Coach: (South Africa) Pieter Rossouw

- Caps Updated: 13 November 2025 (after Samoa v Namibia)

Player	Position	Date of birth (age)	Caps	Club/province
Armand Combrinck	Hooker	17 April 1997 (age 29)	7	(South Africa) Maties Rugby Club
Louis van der Westhuizen	Hooker	25 February 1995 (age 31)	42	(South Africa) Cheetahs
Torsten van Jaarsveld	Hooker	30 June 1987 (age 39)	29	(France) Stade Montois
Otja Auala	Prop		6	University of Namibia
Joshua Bester	Prop		0	(South Africa) Western Province Academy
Aranos Coetzee	Prop	14 March 1988 (age 38)	42	(South Africa) Cheetahs
Gianluca Savoldelli	Prop		2	(South Africa) Western Province Academy
Haitembu Shikufa	Prop	28 November 2000 (age 25)	16	(South Africa) Leopards
Tiaan de Klerk	Lock	12 June 2001 (age 25)	6	(South Africa) Pumas
Max Katjijeko	Lock	8 April 1995 (age 31)	37	(Romania) CSA Steaua București
Adriaan Ludick	Lock	22 July 1998 (age 28)	20	(Romania) CSA Steaua București
Johan Retief	Lock	10 October 1995 (age 31)	36	(Russia) Krasny Yar
Adriaan Booysen	Back row	17 May 1996 (age 30)	30	(France) US Marmande
Wian Conradie	Back row	14 October 1994 (age 32)	38	(United States) New England Free Jacks
Prince ǃGaoseb	Back row	7 July 1998 (age 28)	25	(Romania) CSA Steaua București
Riaan Grové	Back row	4 April 2003 (age 23)	2	(France) Sarlat
Johan Luttig	Back row	28 May 1996 (age 30)	5	(Namibia) Grootfontein
AJ Kearns	Scrum-half	12 October 1998 (age 28)	9	University of Namibia
TC Kisting	Scrum-half	13 January 1994 (age 32)	23	(Romania) Dinamo București
Jacques Theron	Scrum-half	22 March 1999 (age 27)	14	(Namibia) Wanderers
Cliven Loubser	Fly-half	24 February 1997 (age 29)	35	(United States) Anthem RC
André van den Berg	Fly-half	23 January 1998 (age 28)	14	(France) AS Fleurance
Danco Burger	Centre	28 July 1998 (age 28)	21	(Namibia) Wanderers
Johan Deysel	Centre	26 September 1991 (age 35)	42	(Namibia) Wanderers
Divan Rossouw	Centre	12 March 1996 (age 30)	12	(United States) Seattle Seawolves
J. C. Greyling	Wing	21 June 1991 (age 35)	53	(Namibia) Wanderers
Jürgen Meyer	Wing		6	(Namibia) Wanderers
Jay-Cee Nel	Wing	7 January 1999 (age 27)	6	(South Africa) Pumas
Danie van der Merwe	Wing	22 August 1985 (age 41)	5	(Namibia) Wanderers
Aston Mukwiilongo	Fullback		2	(Namibia) Kudus

== Individual all-time records ==
=== Most caps ===
#	Player	Pos	Span	Mat	Start	Sub	Pts	Tries	Conv	Pens	Drop	Won	Lost	Draw	Win %
1	Eugene Jantjies	Scrum-half	2006–2019	70	46	24	72	3	15	8	1	35	34	1	50.71
2	PJ van Lill	Flanker	2006–2023	63	39	24	40	8	0	0	0	31	31	1	50.00
3	Chrysander Botha	Fullback	2008–2018	55	53	2	209	28	15	13	0	34	20	1	62.72
4	Tinus du Plessis	Flanker	2006–2016	52	44	8	40	8	0	0	0	27	24	1	52.88
5	Darryl de la Harpe	Centre	2010–2019	50	39	11	50	10	0	0	0	25	25	0	50.00
6	Johnny Redelinghuys	Prop	2006–2015	49	31	18	25	5	0	0	0	22	26	1	45.91
7	JC Greyling	Centre	2014–2023	46	38	8	145	29	0	0	0	25	21	0	56.75
7	Johann Tromp	Centre	2012–2021	46	37	9	105	21	0	0	0	26	20	0	55.55
9	Rohan Kitshoff	Flanker	2010–2019	45	31	14	110	22	0	0	0	24	21	0	53.33
10	Casper Viviers	Prop	2010-2023	42	31	11	5	1	0	0	0	23	19	0	52.50

Last updated: Namibia vs Uruguay, 27 September 2023.

=== Most tries ===
#	Player	Pos	Span	Mat	Start	Sub	Pts	Tries	Conv	Pens	Drop
1	JC Greyling	Centre	2014–2023	46	38	8	145	29	0	0	0
2	Chrysander Botha	Fullback	2008–2018	55	53	2	209	28	15	13	0
3	Gerhard Mans	Wing	1990–1994	27	26	1	114	26	0	0	0
4	Rohan Kitshoff	Flanker	2010–2019	45	31	14	110	22	0	0	0
4	Eden Meyer	Wing	1991–1996	21	20	1	102	22	0	0	0
6	Johann Tromp	Centre	2012–2021	46	37	9	105	21	0	0	0
7	Wian Conradie	Flanker	2015–present	30	25	5	90	14	0	0	0
8	Melrick Afrika	Wing	2003–2007	23	18	5	62	12	1	0	0
8	Johan Deysel	Centre	2013–2023	38	36	2	60	12	0	0	0
8	Louis van der Westhuizen	Hooker	2013–present	31	15	16	60	12	0	0	0

Last updated: Namibia vs Uruguay, 27 September 2023.

=== Most points ===
#	Player	Pos	Span	Mat	Start	Sub	Pts	Tries	Conv	Pens	Drop
1	Theuns Kotzé	Fly-half	2011–2017	40	35	5	430	6	110	55	5
2	Jaco Coetzee	Fly-half	1990–1995	28	27	1	335	6	81	45	3
3	Cliven Loubser	Fly-half	2017–present	25	23	2	218	5	65	21	0
4	Chrysander Botha	Fullback	2008–2018	55	53	2	209	28	15	13	0
5	Mot Schreuder	Fly-half	2002–2007	19	17	2	158	4	42	18	0
6	JC Greyling	Centre	2014–2023	46	38	8	145	29	0	0	0
7	Rudie van Vuuren	Fly-half	1997–2003	15	10	5	120	3	27	17	0
8	Gerhard Mans	Wing	1990–1994	27	26	1	114	26	0	0	0
9	Rohan Kitshoff	Flanker	2010–2019	45	31	14	110	22	0	0	0
10	Eden Meyer	Wing	1991–1996	21	20	1	102	22	0	0	0

Last updated: Namibia vs Uruguay, 27 September 2023. Statistics include officially capped matches only.

=== Most points in a match ===
#	Player	Pos	Pts	Tries	Conv	Pens	Drop	Opposition	Venue	Date
1	Justinus van der Westhuizen	Fly-half	33	3	9	0	0	Zambia	(Namibia) Windhoek	26/05/2007
2	Jaco Coetzee	Fly-half	30	3	6	1	0	Kenya	(Kenya) Nairobi	07/07/1993
3	Chrysander Botha	Fullback	29	2	5	3	0	Ivory Coast	(Namibia) Windhoek	27/06/2009
4	Moolman Olivier	Fly-half	26	1	11	0	0	Portugal	(Namibia) Windhoek	21/04/1990
4	Cliven Loubser	Fly-half	26	2	8	0	0	Morocco	(Morocco) Casablanca	30/06/2018
6	Riaan van Wyk	Wing	25	5	0	0	0	Madagascar	(Namibia) Windhoek	15/06/2002
6	Theuns Kotzé	Fly-half	25	1	4	4	0	Russia	(Namibia) Windhoek	18/07/2015
8	Gerhard Mans	Wing	24	6	0	0	0	Portugal	(Namibia) Windhoek	21/04/1990
8	Mot Schreuder	Fly-half	24	0	12	0	0	Kenya	(Namibia) Windhoek	27/05/2006
8	Theuns Kotzé	Fly-half	24	0	12	0	0	Madagascar	(Namibia) Windhoek	06/07/2014

Last updated: Namibia vs Uruguay, 27 September 2023. Statistics include officially capped matches only.

=== Most tries in a match ===
#	Player	Pos	Pts	Tries	Conv	Pens	Drop	Opposition	Venue	Date
1	Gerhard Mans	Wing	24	6	0	0	0	Portugal	(Namibia) Windhoek	21/04/1990
2	Riaan van Wyk	Wing	25	5	0	0	0	Madagascar	(Namibia) Windhoek	15/06/2002
3	Eden Meyer	Wing	20	4	0	0	0	Zimbabwe	(Namibia) Windhoek	16/05/1992
3	Melrick Afrika	Wing	20	4	0	0	0	Kenya	(Kenya) Nairobi	16/08/2003
3	Renaldo Bothma	Number 8	20	4	0	0	0	Madagascar	(Kenya) Nairobi	06/07/2014
3	Rohan Kitshoff	Flanker	20	4	0	0	0	Senegal	(Namibia) Windhoek	08/07/2017
3	JC Greyling	Centre	20	4	0	0	0	Tunisia	(Namibia) Windhoek	23/06/2018
3	Lesley Klim	Wing	20	4	0	0	0	Tunisia	(Namibia) Windhoek	23/06/2018
9	17 players on 3 tries									

Last updated: Namibia vs Uruguay, 27 September 2023. Statistics include officially capped matches only.

=== Most matches as captain ===
#	Player	Pos	Span	Mat	Won	Lost	Draw	%	Pts	Tries	Conv	Pens	Drop
1	Gerhard Mans	Wing	1990–1994	26	20	5	1	78.84	114	26	0	0	0
2	Johan Deysel	Centre	2018–2023	19	12	7	0	66.00	30	6	0	0	0
3	Jacques Burger	Flanker	2007–2015	17	7	10	0	41.17	25	5	0	0	0
4	PJ van Lill	Flanker	2012–2021	14	9	5	0	61.53	10	2	0	0	0
5	Corné Powell	Centre	2002–2007	13	9	4	0	69.23	25	5	0	0	0

Last updated: Namibia vs Uruguay, 27 September 2023. Statistics include officially capped matches only.

== Past coaches ==
Since the 1999 Rugby World Cup

Years	Coach
1999	(South Africa) Rudy Joubert
2000	(Namibia) Sarel Losper
2000–2001	(Namibia) Henry Pretorius
2002–2003	(New Zealand) David Waterston
2004–2005	(Namibia) Danie Vermeulen
2005	(Namibia) Christo Alexander
2006–2007	(Namibia) Johan Venter
2007	(Namibia) Hakkies Husselman
2008–2009	(South Africa) John Williams
2009–2011	(Namibia) Johan Diergaardt
2012–2015	(Namibia) Danie Vermeulen
2015–2019	(Wales) Phil Davies
2020	(Namibia) Johan Diergaardt
2021–2024	(South Africa) Allister Coetzee
2024–2025	(Namibia) Chrysander Botha
2025	(Namibia) Jacques Burger (Interim)
2025	(South Africa) Pieter Rossouw

== See also ==
- Namibia Rugby Union
- Rugby union in Namibia
