= 2015 World Rugby Pacific Nations Cup =

2015 IRB Pacific Nations Cup

Tournament details
- Countries: Canada; Fiji; Japan; Samoa; Tonga; United States
- Tournament format(s): Round-robin
- Date: 18 July - 3 August 2015

Tournament statistics
- Teams: 6
- Matches played: 12
- Attendance: 70,785 (5,899 per match)
- Tries scored: 53 (4.42 per match)
- Top point scorer(s): (Tonga) Kurt Morath (49)
- Top try scorer(s): (Fiji) Leone Nakarawa (4) (Tonga) Sonatane Takulua (4) (Tonga) Fetuʻu Vainikolo (4)

Final
- Champions: Fiji (2nd title)
- Runners-up: Samoa

The 2015 World Rugby Pacific Nations Cup was the tenth edition of the World Rugby Pacific Nations Cup (formerly known as the IRB Pacific Nations Cup), an annual international rugby union tournament. The 2015 title was contested between the Tier 2 nations of Canada, Fiji, Japan, Samoa, Tonga and the United States.

Due to the 2015 Rugby World Cup, the tournament took place in July and August with all teams having access to overseas players. Like the 2014 IRB Pacific Nations Cup, the six teams were divided into two pools, but instead of playing each team from the same pool like in 2014, each team played the three teams from the opposing pool. Following the three rounds of cross pool matches, the six teams were seeded one through to six and played in three final play-offs to determine who finishes first to sixth. The final was contested between Fiji and Samoa, who had previously drawn 30–30 during the Cross-pool matches. Fiji won the final 39–29, scoring 6 tries to claim their second title.

== Venues ==
Five venues will be used:

Venue	City	Capacity	Round
ANZ Stadium	(Fiji) Suva	15,000	Round 1
Avaya Stadium	(United States) San Jose	18,000	Round 1
BMO Field	(Canada) Toronto	30,000	Round 3
Bonney Field	(United States) Sacramento	8,000	Round 2
Swangard Stadium	(Canada) Burnaby	5,288	Round 2 & Finals

== Final positioning ==
Pos.	Pool	Team	Played	Won	Drawn	Lost	PF	PA	PD	TF	TA
1	2	Fiji	4	3	1	0	126	103	+23	16	12
2	1	Samoa	4	2	1	1	101	105	-4	11	13
3	1	Tonga	4	3	0	1	114	87	+27	12	8
4	1	Japan	4	1	0	3	80	87	-7	6	7
5	2	United States	4	2	0	2	73	85	-12	4	8
6	2	Canada	4	0	0	4	57	84	-27	5	6

== Table ==
	Team	Played	Won	Drawn	Lost	PF	PA	PD	TF	TA	Try Bonus	Losing Bonus	Points
Overall Standings
1	Fiji (10)	3	2	1	0	87	74	+13	10	9	1	0	11
2	Samoa (9)	3	2	1	0	72	66	+6	8	7	1	0	11
3	Tonga (12)	3	2	0	1	83	67	+16	9	7	0	0	8
4	Japan (13)	3	1	0	2	60	56	+4	5	4	0	2	6
5	United States (16)	3	1	0	2	58	72	-14	4	7	0	1	5
6	Canada (17)	3	0	0	3	44	69	-25	4	6	0	1	1
Pool 1 Standings
1	Samoa	3	2	1	0	72	66	+6	8	7	1	0	11
2	Tonga	3	2	0	1	83	67	+16	9	7	0	0	8
3	Japan	3	1	0	2	60	56	+4	5	4	0	2	6
Pool 2 Standings
1	Fiji	3	2	1	0	87	74	+13	10	9	1	0	11
2	United States	3	1	0	2	58	72	-14	4	7	0	1	5
3	Canada	3	0	0	3	44	69	-25	4	6	0	1	1
Points breakdown: *4 points for a win *2 points for a draw *1 bonus point for a loss by seven points or less *1 bonus point for scoring four or more tries in a match Pre-tournament rankings are in parentheses.

== Fixtures ==
The full match schedule was announced on 19 February 2015.

=== Cross-pool matches ===
==== Round 1 ====
18 July 2015
15:00 FJT (UTC+12)

Fiji	30–22	Tonga
Try: Seniloli 38' c Nayacalevu 66' c Ravai 73' c Con: Volavola (3/3) 39', 67', 74'; Pen: Volavola (3/4) 23', 54', 61'	Report	Try: Vainikolo 5' m Veainu 47' c Takulua 65' c Con: Lilo (1/1) 48'; Morath (1/1) 66'; Pen: Lilo (1/1) 40'

ANZ National Stadium, Suva
Attendance: 3,000
Referee: Chris Pollock (New Zealand)

FB	15	Kini Murimurivalu
RW	14	Waisea Nayacalevu
OC	13	Vereniki Goneva (c)
IC	12	Levani Botia
LW	11	Asaeli Tikoirotuma
FH	10	Ben Volavola	(substituted off) 78'
SH	9	Henry Seniloli	(substituted off) 63'
N8	8	Sakiusa Matadigo	(substituted off) 76'
OF	7	Malakai Ravulo
BF	6	Dominiko Waqaniburotu
RL	5	Leone Nakarawa
LL	4	Tevita Cavubati	(substituted off) 76'
TP	3	Manasa Saulo
HK	2	Sunia Koto	(substituted off) 60'
LP	1	Campese Ma'afu	(substituted off) 74'
Replacements:
HK	16	Talemaitoga Tuapati	(substituted on) 60'
PR	17	Peni Ravai	(substituted on) 74'
PR	18	Taniela Koroi
LK	19	Nemia Soqeta	(substituted on) 76'
FL	20	Peceli Yato	(substituted on) 76'
SH	21	Nikola Matawalu	(substituted on) 63'
FH	22	Josh Matavesi	(substituted on) 78'
FB	23	Metuisela Talebula
Coach:
(New Zealand) John McKee

FB	15	Vunga Lilo
RW	14	Telusa Veainu
OC	13	Alipate Fatafehi	(substituted off) 62'
IC	12	Sione Piukala
LW	11	Fetuʻu Vainikolo
FH	10	Latiume Fosita	(substituted off) 79'
SH	9	Taniela Moa	(substituted off) 40'
N8	8	Viliami Maʻafu
OF	7	Nili Latu (c)
BF	6	Hale T-Pole	(substituted off) 76'
RL	5	Tukulua Lokotui
LL	4	Steve Mafi	(substituted off) 73'
TP	3	Halani Aulika	(substituted off) 55'
HK	2	Elvis Taione
LP	1	Sona Taumalolo	(substituted off) 55'
Replacements:
HK	16	Sosefo Sakalia
PR	17	Tevita Mailau	(substituted on) 55'
PR	18	Sila Puafisi	(substituted on) 55'
LK	19	Uili Koloʻofai	(substituted on) 73'
FL	20	Viliami Fihaki	(substituted on) 76'
SH	21	Sonatane Takulua	(substituted on) 40'
FH	22	Kurt Morath	(substituted on) 62'
WG	23	Otulea Katoa	(substituted on) 79'
Coach:
(Tonga) Mana Otai

Man of the Match:
Levani Botia (Fiji)

Touch judges:
Nick Briant (New Zealand)
Ben O'Keeffe (New Zealand)

Notes:

- Peceli Yato made his international debut for Fiji.
- Telusa Veainu made his international debuts for Tonga.

18 July 2015
17:00 PDT (UTC-07)

Canada	6–20	Japan
Pen: McRorie (2/2) 17', 61'	Report	Try: Fujita 13' m Pen: Goromaru (5/6) 5', 45', 54', 64', 66'

Avaya Stadium, San Jose
Attendance: 8,900
Referee: Luke Pearce (England)

FB	15	Matt Evans
RW	14	Jeff Hassler
OC	13	Ciaran Hearn
IC	12	Connor Braid
LW	11	D. T. H. van der Merwe	(substituted off) 54'
FH	10	Liam Underwood	(substituted off) 75'
SH	9	Gordon McRorie	(substituted off) 68'
N8	8	Tyler Ardron (c)
OF	7	Richard Thorpe
BF	6	Thyssen de Goede	(substituted off) 61'
RL	5	Jon Phelan	(substituted off) 64'
LL	4	Brett Beukeboom
TP	3	Doug Wooldridge	(substituted off) 46'
HK	2	Ray Barkwill	24' to 35'		(substituted off) 56'
LP	1	Hubert Buydens	(substituted off) 68'
Replacements:
HK	16	Aaron Carpenter	(substituted on) 24'	(substituted off) 35'	(substituted on) 56'
PR	17	Djustice Sears-Duru	(substituted on) 68'
PR	18	Andrew Tiedemann	(substituted on) 46'
LK	19	Tyler Hotson	(substituted on) 64'
FL	20	Callum Morrison	(substituted on) 61'
SH	21	Phil Mack	(substituted on) 68'
FH	22	Nathan Hirayama	(substituted on) 75'
WG	23	Phil Mackenzie	(substituted on) 54'
Coach:
(New Zealand) Kieran Crowley

FB	15	Ayumu Goromaru (c)
RW	14	Yoshikazu Fujita		(substituted off) 64'
OC	13	Kotaro Matsushima
IC	12	Yuu Tamura	(yellow card) 33' to 43'
LW	11	Kenki Fukuoka
FH	10	Harumichi Tatekawa		(substituted off) 10'
SH	9	Atsushi Hiwasa
N8	8	Hayden Hopgood
OF	7	Michael Broadhurst
BF	6	Justin Ives
RL	5	Luke Thompson
LL	4	Hitoshi Ono		(substituted off) 61'
TP	3	Hiroshi Yamashita		(substituted off) 51'
HK	2	Shota Horie		(substituted off) 70'
LP	1	Hisateru Hirashima		(substituted off) 51'
Replacements:
PR	16	Keita Inagaki		(substituted on) 51'
HK	17	Takeshi Kizu		(substituted on) 70'
PR	18	Shinnosuke Kakinaga		(substituted on) 51'
LK	19	Kazuhiko Usami		(substituted on) 61'
FL	20	Tsuyoshi Murata
SH	21	Keisuke Uchida
WG	22	Toshiaki Hirose		(substituted on) 10'
CE	23	Tim Bennetts		(substituted on) 64'
Coach:
(Australia) Eddie Jones

Man of the Match:
Ayumu Goromaru (Japan)

Touch judges:
Federico Anselmi (Argentina)
Nick Ricono (United States)

Notes:

- Thyssen de Goede and Callum Morrison made their international debuts for Canada.
- Tim Bennetts made his international debut for Japan.

18 July 2015
19:00 PDT (UTC-07)

United States	16–21	Samoa
Try: Lamositele 74' c Con: MacGinty (1/1) 75'; Pen: MacGinty (3/4) 22', 55', 64'	Report	Try: A. Tuilagi 32' c Tuala 37' m Con: Fa'apale (1/2) 33'; Pen: Fa'apale (3/4) 4', 15', 24'

Avaya Stadium, San Jose
Attendance: 10,017
Referee: JP Doyle (England)

FB	15	Chris Wyles (c)
RW	14	Takudzwa Ngwenya	(substituted off) 73'
OC	13	Seamus Kelly
IC	12	Thretton Palamo	(substituted off) 63'
LW	11	Blaine Scully
FH	10	AJ MacGinty
SH	9	Shalom Suniula	(substituted off) 61'
N8	8	Danny Barrett
OF	7	John Quill
BF	6	Cam Dolan
RL	5	Greg Peterson	(substituted off) 51'
LL	4	Hayden Smith	(substituted off) 65'
TP	3	Matekitonga Moeakiola	(substituted off) 24'
HK	2	Phil Thiel	(substituted off) 59'
LP	1	Eric Fry
Replacements:
HK	16	Zach Fenoglio	(substituted on) 59'
PR	17	Chris Baumann
PR	18	Titi Lamositele	(substituted on) 24'
LK	19	Scott LaValla	(substituted on) 51'
FL	20	Andrew Durutalo	(substituted on) 65'
SH	21	Mike Petri	(substituted on) 61'
CE	22	Andrew Suniula	(substituted on) 63'
WG	23	Zack Test	(substituted on) 73'
Coach:
(United States) Mike Tolkin

FB	15	Ahsee Tuala	(substituted off) 70'
RW	14	Sinoti Sinoti
OC	13	Paul Perez
IC	12	Faialaga Afamasaga	(substituted off) 61'
LW	11	Alesana Tuilagi (c)
FH	10	Patrick Fa'apale
SH	9	Vavao Afemai	(substituted off) 75'
N8	8	Sanele Vavae Tuilagi	(substituted off) 64'
OF	7	Jack Lam
BF	6	TJ Ioane
RL	5	Faatiga Lemalu
LL	4	Filo Paulo	(substituted off) 70'
TP	3	Anthony Perenise
HK	2	Manu Leiataua	(substituted off) 53'
LP	1	Sakaria Taulafo	(substituted off) 53'
Replacements:
HK	16	Motu Matu'u	(substituted on) 53'
PR	17	Viliamu Afatia	(substituted on) 53'
PR	18	Jake Grey
LK	19	Maselino Paulino	(substituted on) 70'
FL	20	Oneone Faafou	(substituted on) 64'
SH	21	Pele Cowley	(substituted on) 75'
CE	22	Johnny Leota	(substituted on) 61'
FB	23	Fa'atoina Autagavaia	(substituted on) 70'
Coach:
(Samoa) Stephen Betham

Man of the Match:
TJ Ioane (Samoa)

Touch judges:
Federico Anselmi (Argentina)
Andrew McMaster (Canada)

Notes:

- AJ MacGinty and Zack Test made their international debuts for the United States.
- Motu Matu'u and Sanele Vavae Tuilagi made their international debuts for Samoa.

==== Round 2 ====
24 July 2015
17:00 PDT (UTC-07)

Fiji	30–30	Samoa
Try: Nakarawa (2) 10' m, 13' c Talebula 35' m Lovobalavu 42' c Con: Volavola (2/4) 14', 43'; Pen: Volavola (2/3) 49', 76'	Report	Try: Perez (2) 20' c, 62' m Perenise 55' m Ioane 72' c Con: Stanley (2/4) 21', 73'; Pen: Stanley (1/2) 4'; Fa'apale (1/1) 79'

Bonney Field, Sacramento
Attendance: 5,500
Referee: JP Doyle (England)

FB	15	Metuisela Talebula	(substituted off) 77'
RW	14	Waisea Nayacalevu
OC	13	Vereniki Goneva
IC	12	Gabiriele Lovobalavu
LW	11	Asaeli Tikoirotuma	(substituted off) 65'
FH	10	Ben Volavola
SH	9	Nemia Kenatale	(substituted off) 71'
N8	8	Sakiusa Matadigo
OF	7	Akapusi Qera (c)	(substituted off) 60'
BF	6	Peceli Yato	(substituted off) 51'
RL	5	Leone Nakarawa
LL	4	Api Ratuniyarawa
TP	3	Manasa Saulo	(substituted off) 77'
HK	2	Sunia Koto	16' to 29'		(substituted off) 71'
LP	1	Peni Ravai	(substituted off) 56'
Replacements:
HK	16	Viliame Veikoso	(substituted on) 16'	(substituted off) 29'	(substituted on) 71'
PR	17	Campese Ma'afu	(substituted on) 56'
PR	18	Taniela Koroi	(substituted on) 77'
LK	19	Nemia Soqeta	(substituted on) 60'
FL	20	Malakai Ravulo	(substituted on) 51'
SH	21	Henry Seniloli	(substituted on) 71'
FH	22	Josh Matavesi	(substituted on) 77'
WG	23	Napolioni Nalaga	(substituted on) 65'
Coach:
(New Zealand) John McKee

FB	15	Fa'atoina Autagavaia	(substituted off) 48'
RW	14	Alofa Alofa
OC	13	Paul Perez
IC	12	Johnny Leota
LW	11	Alesana Tuilagi (c)
FH	10	Michael Stanley	(substituted off) 74'
SH	9	Pele Cowley
N8	8	Sanele Vavae Tuilagi	(substituted off) 48'
OF	7	Jack Lam
BF	6	TJ Ioane
RL	5	Fa'atiga Lemalu	(substituted off) 56'
LL	4	Filo Paulo
TP	3	Anthony Perenise	(substituted off) 61'
HK	2	Motu Matu'u	(substituted off) 52'
LP	1	Sakaria Taulafo	(substituted off) 70'
Replacements:
HK	16	Manu Leiataua	(substituted on) 52'
PR	17	Viliamu Afatia	(substituted on) 70'
PR	18	Jake Grey	(substituted on) 61'
LK	19	Joe Tekori	(substituted on) 56'
FL	20	Faifili Levave	(substituted on) 48'
SH	21	Vavao Afemai
FH	22	Patrick Fa'apale	(substituted on) 74'
WG	23	Faleniu Iosi	(substituted on) 48'
Coach:
(Samoa) Stephen Betham

Man of the Match:
Leone Nakarawa (Fiji)

Touch judges:
Luke Pearce (England)
Andrew McMaster (Canada)

Notes:

- This was Fiji's and Samoa's first draw since 1989.
- Faleniu Iosi made his international debut for Samoa.

24 July 2015
19:00 PDT (UTC-07)

Canada	18–28	Tonga
Try: Carpenter (2) 1' c, 22' m Con: McRorie (1/2) 2'; Pen: Underwood (1/1) 10'; McRorie (1/1) 53'	Report	Try: Takulua (2) 35' c, 67' m Katoa 44' c Con: Morath (2/3) 36', 45'; Pen: Morath (3/4) 17', 51', 57'

Swangard Stadium, Burnaby
Attendance: 3,468
Referee: Federico Anselmi (Argentina)

FB	15	Matt Evans		(substituted off) 71'
RW	14	Jeff Hassler
OC	13	Ciaran Hearn		(substituted off) 6'
IC	12	Connor Braid
LW	11	D. T. H. van der Merwe
FH	10	Liam Underwood	(yellow card) 33' to 43'
SH	9	Gordon McRorie		(substituted off) 69'
N8	8	Tyler Ardron (c)
OF	7	John Moonlight		(substituted off) 57'
BF	6	Richard Thorpe
RL	5	Brett Beukeboom
LL	4	Jon Phelan		(substituted off) 63'
TP	3	Andrew Tiedemann		(substituted off) 40'
HK	2	Aaron Carpenter		(substituted off) 69'
LP	1	Hubert Buydens		(substituted off) 71'
Replacements:
HK	16	Benoît Piffero		(substituted on) 69'
PR	17	Djustice Sears-Duru		(substituted on) 71'
PR	18	Doug Wooldridge		(substituted on) 40'
FL	19	Callum Morrison		(substituted on) 63'
FL	20	Kyle Gilmour		(substituted on) 57'
SH	21	Phil Mack		(substituted on) 69'
FH	22	Nathan Hirayama		(substituted on) 71'
WG	23	Phil Mackenzie		(substituted on) 6'
Coach:
(New Zealand) Kieran Crowley

FB	15	Vunga Lilo
RW	14	Telusa Veainu	(yellow card) 78' to 80'
OC	13	Sione Piukala
IC	12	Viliami Tahituʻa
LW	11	Fetuʻu Vainikolo		(substituted off) 27'
FH	10	Kurt Morath		(substituted off) 77'
SH	9	Sonatane Takulua
N8	8	Viliami Maʻafu		(substituted off) 38'
OF	7	Nili Latu (c)
BF	6	Hale T-Pole
RL	5	Joe Tuineau		(substituted off) 47'
LL	4	Steve Mafi
TP	3	Halani Aulika		(substituted off) 54'
HK	2	Elvis Taione		(substituted off) 72'
LP	1	Tevita Mailau		(substituted off) 54'
Replacements:
HK	16	Sosefo Sakalia		(substituted on) 72'
PR	17	Sona Taumalolo	(yellow card) 79' to 80'	(substituted on) 54'
PR	18	Sila Puafisi		(substituted on) 54'
LK	19	Uili Koloʻofai		(substituted on) 47'
FL	20	Viliami Fihaki		(substituted on) 38'
SH	21	Sosefo Maʻake
FH	22	Latiume Fosita		(substituted on) 77'
WG	23	Otulea Katoa		(substituted on) 27'
Coach:
(Tonga) Mana Otai

Man of the Match:
Sonatane Takulua (Tonga)

Touch judges:
Kurt Weaver (United States)
Brian Zapp (United States)

Notes:

- Sosefo Sakalia and Viliami Tahituʻa made their international debuts for Tonga.

24 July 2015
20:00 PDT (UTC-07)

United States	23–18	Japan
Try: Durutalo 68' m Pen: MacGinty (6/7) 7', 19', 31', 56', 62', 65'	Report	Try: Yamada 39' m Holani 49' c Con: Tatekawa (1/2) 50'; Pen: Tatekawa (2/3) 29', 37'

Bonney Field, Sacramento
Attendance: 11,000
Referee: Luke Pearce (England)

FB	15	Chris Wyles (c)
RW	14	Blaine Scully
OC	13	Seamus Kelly
IC	12	Thretton Palamo		(substituted off) 65'
LW	11	Takudzwa Ngwenya	(yellow card) 47' to 57'	(substituted off) 72'
FH	10	AJ MacGinty
SH	9	Mike Petri		(substituted off) 74'
N8	8	Danny Barrett		(substituted off) 56'
OF	7	Andrew Durutalo
BF	6	Scott LaValla
RL	5	Cam Dolan
LL	4	Hayden Smith		(substituted off) 76'
TP	3	Titi Lamositele
HK	2	Zach Fenoglio		(substituted off) 60'
LP	1	Eric Fry
Replacements:
HK	16	Phil Thiel		(substituted on) 60'
PR	17	Nicholas Wallace
PR	18	Chris Baumann
LK	19	Louis Stanfill		(substituted on) 76'
FL	20	Alastair McFarland		(substituted on) 56'
SH	21	Shalom Suniula		(substituted on) 74'
CE	22	Folau Niua		(substituted on) 65'
WG	23	Zack Test		(substituted on) 72'
Coach:
(United States) Mike Tolkin

FB	15	Yoshikazu Fujita
RW	14	Karne Hesketh
OC	13	Kotaro Matsushima
IC	12	Ryohei Yamanaka		(substituted off) 69'
LW	11	Akihito Yamada
FH	10	Harumichi Tatekawa
SH	9	Keisuke Uchida		(substituted off) 62'
N8	8	Koliniasi Holani
OF	7	Michael Broadhurst	(yellow card) 79' to 80'
BF	6	Justin Ives
RL	5	Luke Thompson
LL	4	Hitoshi Ono		(substituted off) 60'
TP	3	Kensuke Hatakeyama (c)		(substituted off) 72'
HK	2	Takeshi Kizu		(substituted off) 50'
LP	1	Keita Inagaki		(substituted off) 74'
Replacements:
PR	16	Hisateru Hirashima		(substituted on) 74'
HK	17	Hiroki Yuhara		(substituted on) 50'
PR	18	Shinnosuke Kakinaga		(substituted on) 72'
LK	19	Kazuhiko Usami
FL	20	Tsuyoshi Murata		(substituted on) 60'
SH	21	Atsushi Hiwasa		(substituted on) 62'
FH	22	Kosei Ono		(substituted on) 69'
CE	23	Tim Bennetts
Coach:
(Australia) Eddie Jones

Man of the Match:
AJ MacGinty (United States)

Touch judges:
JP Doyle (England)
Andrew McMaster (Canada)

Notes:

- Alastair McFarland made his international debut for the United States.
- Mike Petri earned his 50th test cap for the United States.

==== Round 3 ====
29 July 2015
15:30 EDT (UTC-04)

United States	19–33	Tonga
Try: Durutalo (2) 70' m, 80 m Pen: Niua (3/4) 14', 47', 59'	Report	Try: Vainikolo (2) 5' c, 65' c Veainu 52' c Con: Morath (3/3) 6', 53', 66'; Pen: Morath (4/5) 17', 24', 37', 55'

BMO Field, Toronto
Attendance: 9,600
Referee: Alexandre Ruiz (France)

FB	15	Troy Hall
RW	14	Brett Thompson
OC	13	Folau Niua	(substituted off) 79'
IC	12	Andrew Suniula
LW	11	Zack Test
FH	10	Toby L'Estrange	(substituted off) 50'
SH	9	Shalom Suniula
N8	8	Alastair McFarland
OF	7	Scott LaValla
BF	6	Cam Dolan	(substituted off) 59'
RL	5	Greg Peterson
LL	4	Louis Stanfill	(substituted off) 18'
TP	3	Chris Baumann
HK	2	Phil Thiel (c)	(substituted off) 40'
LP	1	Mate Moeakiola	(substituted off) 47'
Replacements:
HK	16	Zach Fenoglio	(substituted on) 40'
PR	17	Nicholas Wallace		(substituted on) 78'
PR	18	Eric Fry	(substituted on) 47'	(substituted off) 78'
LK	19	Hayden Smith	(substituted on) 18'
FL	20	Andrew Durutalo	(substituted on) 59'
SH	21	Mike Petri	(substituted on) 50'
CE	22	Thretton Palamo	(substituted on) 79'
WG	23	Tim Stanfill
Coach:
(United States) Mike Tolkin

FB	15	Otulea Katoa
RW	14	Telusa Veainu	(substituted off) 61'
OC	13	Sione Piukala
IC	12	Alipate Fatafehi	(substituted off) 49'
LW	11	Fetuʻu Vainikolo
FH	10	Kurt Morath
SH	9	Sonatane Takulua	(substituted off) 71'
N8	8	Viliami Fihaki	(substituted off) 63'
OF	7	Jack Ram
BF	6	Steve Mafi (c)
RL	5	Joe Tuineau
LL	4	Uili Koloʻofai	(substituted off) 59'
TP	3	Halani Aulika	(substituted off) 61'
HK	2	Elvis Taione	(substituted off) 71'
LP	1	Soane Tongaʻuiha	(substituted off) 48'
Replacements:
HK	16	Sosefo Sakalia	(substituted on) 71'
PR	17	Sona Taumalolo	(substituted on) 48'
PR	18	Sila Puafisi	(substituted on) 61'
LK	19	Tukulua Lokotui	(substituted on) 59'
FL	20	Hale T-Pole	(substituted on) 63'
SH	21	Sosefo Maʻake	(substituted on) 71'
FH	22	Latiume Fosita	(substituted on) 49'
FB	23	Vunga Lilo	(substituted on) 61'
Coach:
(Tonga) Mana Otai

Man of the Match:
Fetuʻu Vainikolo (Tonga)

Touch judges:
JP Doyle (England)
Andrew McMaster (Canada)

Notes:

- Chris Baumann made his international debut for the United States.
- Sosefo Maʻake and Jack Ram made their international debuts for Tonga.

29 July 2015
18:00 EDT (UTC-04)

Fiji	27–22	Japan
Try: Cavubati 21' c Matavesi 25' c Talebula 28' c Con: Matavesi (3/3) 22', 26', 29'; Pen: Matavesi (2/3) 19', 61'	Report	Try: Yamada 48' m Tui 68' m Pen: Goromaru (4/4) 5', 11', 17', 52'

BMO Field, Toronto
Attendance: 8,100
Referee: Pascal Gaüzère (France)

FB	15	Kini Murimurivalu		(substituted off) 70'
RW	14	Metuisela Talebula
OC	13	Vereniki Goneva
IC	12	Levani Botia
LW	11	Napolioni Nalaga
FH	10	Josh Matavesi
SH	9	Henry Seniloli		(substituted off) 61'
N8	8	Akapusi Qera (c)
OF	7	Malakai Ravulo		(substituted off) 44'	(substituted on) 56'	(substituted off) 70'
BF	6	Dominiko Waqaniburotu
RL	5	Leone Nakarawa	(yellow card) 77' to 80'
LL	4	Tevita Cavubati
TP	3	Manasa Saulo	(yellow card) 44' to 54'		(substituted off) 56'
HK	2	Talemaitoga Tuapati		(substituted off) 61'
LP	1	Campese Ma'afu	(yellow card) 79' to 80'
Replacements:
HK	16	Sunia Koto		(substituted on) 61'
PR	17	Peni Ravai			(substituted on) 79'
PR	18	Isei Colati		(substituted on) 44'
LK	19	Nemia Soqeta
FL	20	Peceli Yato				(substituted on) 70'
SH	21	Nikola Matawalu		(substituted on) 61'
FH	22	Ben Volavola		(substituted on) 70'	(substituted off) 79'
WG	23	Waisea Nayacalevu
Coach:
(New Zealand) John McKee

FB	15	Ayumu Goromaru
RW	14	Akihito Yamada
OC	13	Kotaro Matsushima
IC	12	Yu Tamura	(substituted off) 26'	(substituted on) 56'	(substituted off) 59'
LW	11	Kenki Fukuoka	(substituted off) 65'
FH	10	Harumichi Tatekawa		56' to 59'
SH	9	Fumiaki Tanaka
N8	8	Hendrik Tui
OF	7	Michael Leitch (c)
BF	6	Michael Broadhurst	(substituted off) 70'
RL	5	Shoji Ito	(substituted off) 54'
LL	4	Luke Thompson
TP	3	Hiroshi Yamashita	(substituted off) 39'
HK	2	Shota Horie
LP	1	Keita Inagaki	(substituted off) 69'
Replacements:
PR	16	Hisateru Hirashima	(substituted on) 69'
HK	17	Hiroki Yuhara
PR	18	Kensuke Hatakeyama	(substituted on) 39'
LK	19	Hitoshi Ono	(substituted on) 54'
FL	20	Justin Ives	(substituted on) 70'
SH	21	Atsushi Hiwasa
FH	22	Kosei Ono	(substituted on) 26'
WG	23	Yoshikazu Fujita	(substituted on) 65'
Coach:
(Australia) Eddie Jones

Man of the Match:
Josh Matavesi (Fiji)

Touch judges:
Angus Gardner (Australia)
Dudley Phillips (Ireland)

29 July 2015
20:30 EDT (UTC-04)

Canada	20–21	Samoa
Try: Blevins 6' c Mackenzie 75' c Con: Pritchard (2/2) 7' 76'; Pen: Pritchard (2/4) 2', 12'	Report	Try: Perenise 43' c Taulafo 80' m Con: Stanley (1/2) 44'; Pen: Stanley (3/3) 22', 63', 65'

BMO Field, Toronto
Attendance: 11,200
Referee: Angus Gardner (Australia)

FB	15	James Pritchard
RW	14	Phil Mackenzie
OC	13	Conor Trainor
IC	12	Nick Blevins
LW	11	Matt Evans	(substituted off) 61'
FH	10	Nathan Hirayama
SH	9	Phil Mack	(substituted off) 61'
N8	8	Tyler Ardron (c)	(substituted off) 3'
OF	7	John Moonlight
BF	6	Kyle Gilmour	(substituted off) 76'
RL	5	Evan Olmstead
LL	4	Tyler Hotson
TP	3	Doug Wooldridge	(substituted off) 50'
HK	2	Ray Barkwill	35' to 40'		(substituted off) 50'
LP	1	Djustice Sears-Duru	(substituted off) 50'	(substituted on) 72'
Replacements:
HK	16	Benoît Piffero	(substituted on) 35'	(substituted off) 40'	(substituted on) 50'
PR	17	Hubert Buydens	(substituted on) 50'
PR	18	Andrew Tiedemann	(substituted on) 50'	(substituted off) 72'
FL	19	Callum Morrison	(substituted on) 76'
FL	20	Thyssen de Goede	(substituted on) 3'	(substituted off) 55'
N8	21	Aaron Carpenter		(substituted on) 55'
SH	22	Gordon McRorie	(substituted on) 61'
FH	23	Harry Jones	(substituted on) 61'
Coach:
(New Zealand) Kieran Crowley

FB	15	Ahsee Tuala		(substituted off) 76'
RW	14	Sinoti Sinoti
OC	13	Paul Perez	(yellow card) 12' to 22'	(substituted off) 63'
IC	12	Faialaga Afamasaga
LW	11	Alesana Tuilagi (c)
FH	10	Michael Stanley
SH	9	Pele Cowley		(substituted off) 15'
N8	8	Sanele Vavae Tuilagi		(substituted off) 69'
OF	7	TJ Ioane
BF	6	Faifili Levave
RL	5	Joe Tekori		(substituted off) 55'
LL	4	Filo Paulo
TP	3	Anthony Perenise		(substituted off) 63'
HK	2	Motu Matu'u		(substituted off) 72'
LP	1	Viliamu Afatia		(substituted off) 48'
Replacements:
HK	16	Andrew Williams		(substituted on) 72'
PR	17	Sakaria Taulafo		(substituted on) 48'
PR	18	Jake Grey		(substituted on) 63'
LK	19	Maselino Paulino		(substituted on) 55'
FL	20	Francis Ieremia		(substituted on) 69'
SH	21	Vavao Afemai		(substituted on) 15'
FH	22	Patrick Fa'apale		(substituted on) 76'
WG	23	Faleniu Iosi		(substituted on) 63'
Coach:
(Samoa) Stephen Betham

Man of the Match:
Phil Mack (Canada)

Touch judges:
Luke Pearce (England)
Dudley Phillips (Ireland)

Notes:

- Evan Olmstead made his international debut for Canada.
- Francis Ieremia made hie international debut for Samoa.

=== Finals ===
==== 3rd Place play-off ====
3 August 2015
11:00 PDT (UTC-07)

Tonga	31–20	Japan
Try: Aulika 30' c Vainikolo 54' c Takulua 79' c Con: Morath (2/3) 31', 80'; Pen: Morath (4/5) 10', 34', 40', 60'	Report	Try: Tui 32' m Pen: Goromaru (5/6) 7', 16', 42', 48', 64'

Swangard Stadium, Burnaby
Referee: Angus Gardner (Australia)

FB	15	Vunga Lilo
RW	14	Otulea Katoa
OC	13	Sione Piukala
IC	12	Viliami Tahituʻa
LW	11	Fetuʻu Vainikolo
FH	10	Kurt Morath
SH	9	Sonatane Takulua
N8	8	Hale T-Pole
OF	7	Nili Latu (c)	(yellow card) 25' to 35'
BF	6	Jack Ram
RL	5	Uili Koloʻofai
LL	4	Tukulua Lokotui
TP	3	Halani Aulika		(substituted off) 55'
HK	2	Elvis Taione
LP	1	Tevita Mailau
Replacements:
HK	16	Kalafi Pongi
PR	17	Soane Tongaʻuiha
PR	18	Sila Puafisi		(substituted on) 55'
LK	19	Sosefo Sakalia
FL	20	Viliami Fihaki
SH	21	Wayne Ngaluafe
FH	22	Martin Naufahu
CE	23	Latiume Fosita
Coach:
(Tonga) Mana Otai

FB	15	Ayumu Goromaru
RW	14	Karne Hesketh
OC	13	Kotaro Matsushima
IC	12	Harumichi Tatekawa
LW	11	Yoshikazu Fujita		(substituted off) 74'
FH	10	Kosei Ono		(substituted off) 64'
SH	9	Fumiaki Tanaka		(substituted off) 74'
N8	8	Koliniasi Holani
OF	7	Michael Broadhurst		(substituted off) 24'
BF	6	Michael Leitch (c)	(yellow card) 28' to 38'
RL	5	Hitoshi Ono		(substituted off) 64'
LL	4	Shoji Ito
TP	3	Hiroshi Yamashita		(substituted off) 40'
HK	2	Shota Horie
LP	1	Keita Inagaki		(substituted off) 33'
Replacements:
PR	16	Hisateru Hirashima		(substituted on) 33'
HK	17	Hiroki Yuhara
PR	18	Kensuke Hatakeyama		(substituted on) 40'
N8	19	Hayden Hopgood	(yellow card) 70' to 80'	(substituted on) 64'
FL	20	Hendrik Tui		(substituted on) 24'
SH	21	Atsushi Hiwasa		(substituted on) 74'
CE	22	Craig Wing		(substituted on) 64'
CE	23	Tim Bennetts		(substituted on) 74'
Coach:
(Australia) Eddie Jones

Man of the Match:
Sonatane Takulua (Tonga)

Touch judges:
Dudley Phillips (Ireland)
Harry Mason (Canada)
Television match official:
USA Appt. (United States)

==== 5th Place play-off ====
3 August 2015
14:00 PDT (UTC-07)

United States	15–13	Canada
Pen: MacGinty (4/4) 10', 21', 24', 30'; Drop: MacGinty (1/1) 79'	Report	Try: Blevins 71' c Con: Underwood (1/1) 72'; Pen: Underwood (2/3) 2', 44'

Swangard Stadium, Burnaby
Referee: Alexandre Ruiz (France)

FB	15	Chris Wyles (c)
RW	14	Brett Thompson
OC	13	Folau Niua
IC	12	Andrew Suniula		(substituted off) 58'
LW	11	Zack Test
FH	10	AJ MacGinty	(yellow card) 62' to 72'
SH	9	Mike Petri		(substituted off) 70'
N8	8	Danny Barrett	(yellow card) 49' to 59'
OF	7	Andrew Durutalo		(substituted off) 56'
BF	6	Scott LaValla
RL	5	Greg Peterson	(yellow card) 23' to 33'	(substituted off) 56'
LL	4	Hayden Smith		(substituted off) 65'
TP	3	Titi Lamositele		(substituted off) 65'
HK	2	Zach Fenoglio		(substituted off) 62'
LP	1	Eric Fry
Replacements:
HK	16	Phil Thiel		(substituted on) 62'
PR	17	Matekitonga Moeakiola
PR	18	Chris Baumann		(substituted on) 65'
N8	19	Cam Dolan		(substituted on) 56'
FL	20	John Quill		(substituted on) 56'
FL	21	Alastair McFarland		(substituted on) 65'
FH	22	Shalom Suniula		(substituted on) 70'
CE	23	Thretton Palamo		(substituted on) 58'
Coach:
(United States) Mike Tolkin

FB	15	Harry Jones
RW	14	Jeff Hassler
OC	13	Ciaran Hearn
IC	12	Connor Braid		(substituted off) 56'
LW	11	Conor Trainor		(substituted off) 63'
FH	10	Liam Underwood
SH	9	Jamie Mackenzie		(substituted off) 60'
N8	8	Richard Thorpe		(substituted off) 56'
OF	7	John Moonlight	(yellow card) 30' to 40'
BF	6	Kyle Gilmour
RL	5	Brett Beukeboom		(substituted off) 32'
LL	4	Jon Phelan
TP	3	Jake Ilnicki		(substituted off) 56'
HK	2	Aaron Carpenter (c)		(substituted off) 56'
LP	1	Hubert Buydens		(substituted off) 62'
Replacements:
HK	16	Ray Barkwill		(substituted on) 56'
PR	17	Djustice Sears-Duru		(substituted on) 62'
PR	18	Doug Wooldridge		(substituted on) 56'
FL	19	Evan Olmstead		(substituted on) 32'
FL	20	Nanyak Dala		(substituted on) 56'
SH	21	Phil Mack		(substituted on) 60'
CE	22	Nick Blevins		(substituted on) 56'
FB	23	James Pritchard		(substituted on) 63'
Coach:
(New Zealand) Kieran Crowley

Man of the Match:
Jeff Hassler (Canada)

Touch judges:
Dudley Phillips (Ireland)
Harry Mason (Canada)
Television match official:
USA Appt. (United States)

Notes:

- This was the United States first win over Canada in Canada since 2005.
- With the United States win in 2014, this was the United States first back to back wins since 2003.

==== 1st Place play-off ====
3 August 2015
17:00 PDT (UTC-07)

Fiji	39–29	Samoa
Try: Nakarawa (2) 2' c, 51' m Matawalu 20' c Murimurivalu 60' c Qera 62' c Con: Matavesi (2/2) 3', 21'; Volavola (2/3) 61', 63'; Pen: Matavesi (1/2) 15'; Volavola (1/2) 75'	Report	Try: Lam 43' c Autagavaia (2) 48' m, 69' m Con: Stanley (1/2) 44'; Pen: Stanley (4/4) 18', 24', 32', 53'

Swangard Stadium, Burnaby
Referee: Pascal Gaüzère (France)

FB	15	Kini Murimurivalu
RW	14	Metuisela Talebula
OC	13	Waisea Nayacalevu
IC	12	Gabiriele Lovobalavu		(substituted off) 46'
LW	11	Asaeli Tikoirotuma
FH	10	Josh Matavesi		(substituted off) 68'
SH	9	Nikola Matawalu
N8	8	Sakiusa Matadigo
OF	7	Akapusi Qera (c)
BF	6	Dominiko Waqaniburotu		(substituted off) 49'
RL	5	Leone Nakarawa
LL	4	Tevita Cavubati		(substituted off) 65'
TP	3	Manasa Saulo
HK	2	Sunia Koto		(substituted off) 72'
LP	1	Campese Ma'afu		(substituted off) 65'
Replacements:
HK	16	Talemaitoga Tuapati		(substituted on) 72'
PR	17	Peni Ravai		(substituted on) 65'
PR	18	Isei Colati
LK	19	Nemia Soqeta		(substituted on) 63'
FL	20	Peceli Yato	(yellow card) 67' to 77'	(substituted on) 49'
SH	21	Nemia Kenatale
FH	22	Ben Volavola		(substituted on) 46'
WG	23	Napolioni Nalaga		(substituted on) 68'
Coach:
(New Zealand) John McKee

FB	15	Ahsee Tuala	(substituted off) 58'
RW	14	Fa'atoina Autagavaia
OC	13	Johnny Leota
IC	12	Faialaga Afamasaga
LW	11	Alesana Tuilagi (c)
FH	10	Michael Stanley	(substituted off) 58'
SH	9	Kahn Fotuali'i	(substituted off) 72'
N8	8	Sanele Vavae Tuilagi
OF	7	Jack Lam	(substituted off) 61'
BF	6	Faifili Levave
RL	5	Fa'atiga Lemalu	(substituted off) 46'
LL	4	Joe Tekori
TP	3	Anthony Perenise	(substituted off) 72'
HK	2	Manu Leiataua	(substituted off) 75'
LP	1	Sakaria Taulafo	(substituted off) 73'
Replacements:
HK	16	Andrew Williams	(substituted on) 75'
PR	17	Viliamu Afatia	(substituted on) 73'
PR	18	Jake Grey	(substituted on) 72'
LK	19	Filo Paulo	(substituted on) 46'
N8	20	TJ Ioane	(substituted on) 61'
SH	21	Vavao Afemai	(substituted on) 72'
FH	22	Patrick Fa'apale	(substituted on) 58'
WG	23	Sinoti Sinoti	(substituted on) 58'
Coach:
(Samoa) Stephen Betham

Man of the Match:
Nikola Matawalu (Fiji)

Touch judges:
Alexandre Ruiz (France)
Kurt Weaver (United States)
Television match official:
USA Appt. (United States)

== Statistics ==
=== Points scorers ===
Pos	Name	Team	Pts
1	Kurt Morath	Tonga	49
2	AJ MacGinty	United States	44
3	Ayumu Goromaru	Japan	42
4	Michael Stanley	Samoa	32
4	Ben Volavola	Fiji	32
6	Josh Matavesi	Fiji	24
7	Leone Nakarawa	Fiji	20
7	Sonatane Takulua	Tonga	20
7	Fetuʻu Vainikolo	Tonga	20
10	Andrew Durutalo	United States	15
11	Patrick Fa'apale	Samoa	14
12	Gordon McRorie	Canada	11
12	Liam Underwood	Canada	11
14	Fa'atoina Autagavaia	Samoa	10
14	Nick Blevins	Canada	10
14	Aaron Carpenter	Canada	10
14	Anthony Perenise	Samoa	10
14	Paul Perez	Samoa	10
14	James Pritchard	Canada	10
14	Metuisela Talebula	Fiji	10
14	Hendrik Tui	Japan	10
14	Telusa Veainu	Tonga	10
14	Akihito Yamada	Japan	10
24	Folau Niua	United States	9
25	Harumichi Tatekawa	Japan	8
26	Halani Aulika	Tonga	5
26	Tevita Cavubati	Fiji	5
26	Yoshikazu Fujita	Japan	5
26	Koliniasi Holani	Japan	5
26	TJ Ioane	Samoa	5
26	Otulea Katoa	Tonga	5
26	Jack Lam	Samoa	5
26	Titi Lamositele	United States	5
26	Gabiriele Lovobalavu	Fiji	5
26	Vunga Lilo	Tonga	5
26	Phil Mackenzie	Canada	5
26	Nikola Matawalu	Fiji	5
26	Kini Murimurivalu	Fiji	5
26	Waisea Nayacalevu	Fiji	5
26	Akapusi Qera	Fiji	5
26	Peni Ravai	Fiji	5
26	Henry Seniloli	Fiji	5
26	Sakaria Taulafo	Samoa	5
26	Ahsee Tuala	Samoa	5
26	Alesana Tuilagi	Samoa	5

=== Try scorers ===
Pos	Name	Team	Tries
1	Leone Nakarawa	Fiji	4
1	Sonatane Takulua	Tonga	4
1	Fetuʻu Vainikolo	Tonga	4
4	Andrew Durutalo	United States	3
5	Fa'atoina Autagavaia	Samoa	2
5	Nick Blevins	Canada	2
5	Aaron Carpenter	Canada	2
5	Anthony Perenise	Samoa	2
5	Paul Perez	Samoa	2
5	Metuisela Talebula	Fiji	2
5	Hendrik Tui	Japan	2
5	Telusa Veainu	Tonga	2
5	Akihito Yamada	Japan	2
14	Halani Aulika	Tonga	1
14	Tevita Cavubati	Fiji	1
14	Yoshikazu Fujita	Japan	1
14	Koliniasi Holani	Japan	1
14	TJ Ioane	Samoa	1
14	Otulea Katoa	Tonga	1
14	Jack Lam	Samoa	1
14	Titi Lamositele	United States	1
14	Gabiriele Lovobalavu	Fiji	1
14	Phil Mackenzie	Canada	1
14	Nikola Matawalu	Fiji	1
14	Kini Murimurivalu	Fiji	1
14	Josh Matavesi	Fiji	1
14	Waisea Nayacalevu	Fiji	1
14	Akapusi Qera	Fiji	1
14	Peni Ravai	Fiji	1
14	Henry Seniloli	Fiji	1
14	Sakaria Taulafo	Samoa	1
14	Ahsee Tuala	Samoa	1
14	Alesana Tuilagi	Samoa	1

== Squads ==
Nation	Head coach	Captain
Canada	(New Zealand) Kieran Crowley	Tyler Ardron
Fiji	(New Zealand) John McKee	Akapusi Qera
Japan	(Australia) Eddie Jones	Ayumu Goromaru
Samoa	(Samoa) Stephen Betham	Alesana Tuilagi
Tonga	(Tonga) Mana Otai	Nili Latu
United States	(United States) Mike Tolkin	Chris Wyles

Note: Number of caps and players' ages are indicated as of 18 July 2015 – the tournament's opening day, pre first tournament match.

=== Canada ===
Canada's 36-man squad for the 2015 World Rugby Pacific Nations Cup.

Phil Mack, John Moonlight and Nathan Hirayama were late additions to the squad.

Harry Jones and Conor Trainor were added to the squad ahead of the Samoan match.

Nanyak Dala and Jake Ilnicki were added to the squad ahead of the United States final match.

Note: Flags indicate national union for the club/province as defined by World Rugby.

Player	Position	Date of birth (age)	Caps	Club/province
Ray Barkwill	Hooker	26 August 1980 (aged 34)	17	(Canada) Ontario Blues
Aaron Carpenter	Hooker	9 January 1983 (aged 32)	60	(England) Cornish Pirates
Owen Parfrey	Hooker	21 April 1985 (aged 30)	0	(Canada) Atlantic Rock
Benoît Piffero	Hooker	21 May 1987 (aged 28)	4	(Canada) Atlantic Rock
Hubert Buydens	Prop	4 January 1982 (aged 33)	28	(Canada) Prairie Wolf Pack
Tom Dolezel	Prop	13 August 1984 (aged 30)	13	(Canada) Ontario Blues
Jake Ilnicki	Prop	24 February 1992 (aged 23)	6	(Australia) Eastern Suburbs
Jason Marshall	Prop	5 February 1985 (aged 30)	30	(France) Agen
Djustice Sears-Duru	Prop	24 May 1994 (aged 21)	1	(Canada) Ontario Blues
Andrew Tiedemann	Prop	21 July 1988 (aged 26)	30	(England) Plymouth Albion
Doug Wooldridge	Prop	19 December 1985 (aged 29)	14	(Canada) Ontario Blues
Brett Beukeboom	Lock	13 August 1989 (aged 25)	11	(England) Cornish Pirates
Aaron Flagg	Lock	16 June 1989 (aged 26)	1	(Canada) BC Bears
Tyler Hotson	Lock	30 May 1985 (aged 30)	42	(England) Doncaster Knights
Jon Phelan	Lock	20 January 1986 (aged 29)	19	(England) Doncaster Knights
Cameron Pierce	Lock	26 October 1991 (aged 23)	1	(France) Pau
Nanyak Dala	Flanker	18 June 1984 (aged 31)	31	(Canada) Prairie Wolf Pack
Thyssen de Goede	Flanker	24 June 1988 (aged 27)	0	(Canada) BC Bears
Kyle Gilmour	Flanker	26 January 1988 (aged 27)	5	(Canada) Prairie Wolf Pack
John Moonlight	Flanker	2 July 1987 (aged 28)	15	(Canada) Ontario Blues
Callum Morrison	Flanker	28 November 1985 (aged 29)	0	(Canada) BC Bears
Evan Olmstead	Flanker	21 February 1991 (aged 24)	0	(Australia) Parramatta Two Blues
Lucas Rumball	Flanker	28 October 1995 (aged 19)	0	(Canada) Ontario Blues
Tyler Ardron (c)	Number 8	16 June 1991 (aged 24)	17	(Wales) Ospreys
Richard Thorpe	Number 8	1 November 1984 (aged 30)	2	(England) London Welsh
Phil Mack	Scrum-half	18 September 1985 (aged 29)	21	(Canada) BC Bears
Jamie Mackenzie	Scrum-half	28 February 1989 (aged 26)	5	(Canada) Ontario Blues
Gordon McRorie	Scrum-half	12 May 1988 (aged 27)	6	(Canada) Prairie Wolf Pack
Connor Braid	Fly-half	31 May 1990 (aged 25)	14	(Canada) BC Bears
Nathan Hirayama	Fly-half	23 March 1988 (aged 27)	14	(Canada) BC Bears
Harry Jones	Fly-half	26 August 1989 (aged 25)	12	(Canada) BC Bears
Liam Underwood	Fly-half	3 June 1991 (aged 24)	6	(Canada) Ontario Blues
Nick Blevins	Centre	11 November 1988 (aged 26)	20	(Canada) Prairie Wolf Pack
Ciaran Hearn	Centre	30 December 1985 (aged 29)	39	(Canada) Atlantic Rock
Pat Parfrey	Centre	1 November 1991 (aged 23)	7	(Canada) Atlantic Rock
Conor Trainor	Centre	12 May 1989 (aged 26)	13	(Canada) BC Bears
Matt Evans	Wing	2 January 1988 (aged 27)	24	(England) Cornish Pirates
Jeff Hassler	Wing	21 August 1991 (aged 23)	11	(Wales) Ospreys
Phil Mackenzie	Wing	25 February 1987 (aged 28)	21	(Canada) Ontario Blues
Taylor Paris	Wing	6 October 1992 (aged 22)	12	(France) Agen
D. T. H. van der Merwe	Wing	28 April 1986 (aged 29)	32	(Wales) Scarlets
James Pritchard	Fullback	21 July 1979 (aged 35)	59	(England) Bedford Blues

=== Fiji ===
On 12 July 2015, Head Coach John McKee announced a 31-man squad for the 2015 World Rugby Pacific Nations Cup. * denotes non-traveling reserves.

Note: Flags indicate national union for the club/province as defined by World Rugby.

Player	Position	Date of birth (age)	Caps	Club/province
Sunia Koto	Hooker	15 April 1980 (aged 35)	38	(France) Narbonne
Jale Sassen *	Hooker	6 September 1992 (aged 22)	0	(Fiji) Tailevu
Talemaitoga Tuapati	Hooker	16 August 1984 (aged 30)	27	(France) Pays d'Aix
Viliame Veikoso	Hooker	4 April 1982 (aged 33)	29	(England) Doncaster
Lee-roy Atalifo *	Prop	10 May 1988 (aged 27)	1	(Fiji) Suva
Isei Colati	Prop	23 December 1983 (aged 31)	6	(France) Nevers
Taniela Koroi	Prop	8 February 1990 (aged 25)	1	(New Zealand) Wellington
Campese Ma'afu	Prop	19 December 1984 (aged 30)	29	(France) Pays d'Aix
Peni Ravai	Prop	16 June 1990 (aged 25)	3	(Fiji) Nadroga
Manasa Saulo	Prop	6 April 1989 (aged 26)	18	(Romania) Timișoara Saracens
Joeli Veitayaki Jr.	Prop		0	(Fiji) Naitasiri
Jerry Yanuyanutawa *	Prop	10 April 1985 (aged 30)	19	(Scotland) Glasgow Warriors
Tevita Cavubati	Lock	12 August 1987 (aged 27)	4	(Wales) Ospreys
Apisai Naikatini *	Lock	4 April 1985 (aged 30)	18	(France) Agen
Leone Nakarawa	Lock	2 April 1988 (aged 27)	26	(Scotland) Glasgow Warriors
Api Ratuniyarawa	Lock	23 January 1983 (aged 32)	15	(France) Agen
Nemia Soqeta	Lock	4 March 1985 (aged 30)	4	(France) Biarritz
Akapusi Qera (c)	Flanker	24 April 1984 (aged 31)	43	(France) Montpellier
Malakai Ravulo	Flanker	22 September 1983 (aged 31)	30	(Romania) RCJ Farul Constanța
Dominiko Waqaniburotu	Flanker	20 April 1986 (aged 29)	20	(France) Brive
Peceli Yato	Flanker	17 January 1993 (aged 22)	0	(France) Clermont
Johnny Dyer *	Number 8		0	(Fiji) Vatukoula
Sakiusa Matadigo	Number 8	8 August 1982 (aged 32)	16	(France) Lyon
Nemani Nagusa *	Number 8	21 June 1988 (aged 27)	6	(New Zealand) Tasman
Nemia Kenatale	Scrum-half	21 January 1986 (aged 29)	30	(Romania) RCJ Farul Constanța
Nikola Matawalu	Scrum-half	8 March 1989 (aged 26)	22	(England) Bath
Henry Seniloli	Scrum-half	15 June 1989 (aged 26)	4	(Italy) Benetton Treviso
Serupepeli Vularika *	Scrum-half		0	(Fiji) Suva
Josh Matavesi	Fly-half	5 October 1990 (aged 24)	9	(Wales) Ospreys
Ben Volavola	Fly-half	13 January 1991 (aged 24)	1	(Australia) Waratahs
Seremaia Bai *	Centre	4 January 1979 (aged 36)	49	(England) Leicester Tigers
Levani Botia	Centre	28 April 1988 (aged 27)	2	(France) La Rochelle
Gabiriele Lovobalavu	Centre	20 June 1985 (aged 30)	17	(France) Bayonne
Asaeli Tikoirotuma	Centre	24 June 1986 (aged 29)	9	(England) London Irish
Vereniki Goneva	Wing	5 April 1984 (aged 31)	32	(England) Leicester Tigers
Benito Masilevu *	Wing	7 October 1989 (aged 25)	1	(France) Brive
Nemani Nadolo	Wing	31 January 1988 (aged 27)	19	(New Zealand) Crusaders
Napolioni Nalaga *	Wing	7 April 1986 (aged 29)	17	(France) Lyon
Waisea Nayacalevu	Wing	26 June 1990 (aged 25)	7	(France) Stade Français
Kini Murimurivalu	Fullback	15 May 1989 (aged 26)	7	(France) La Rochelle
Metuisela Talebula	Fullback	20 May 1991 (aged 24)	13	(France) Bordeaux Bègles

=== Japan ===
On 29 June 2015, Jones named a 37-man squad for the 2015 World Rugby Pacific Nations Cup.

Note: Flags indicate national union for the club/province as defined by World Rugby.

Player	Position	Date of birth (age)	Caps	Club/province
Shota Horie	Hooker	21 January 1986 (aged 29)	32	(Japan) Panasonic Wild Knights
Takeshi Kizu	Hooker	15 July 1988 (aged 27)	33	(Japan) Kobelco Steelers
Hiroki Yuhara	Hooker	21 January 1984 (aged 31)	20	(Japan) Toshiba Brave Lupus
Kensuke Hatakeyama	Prop	2 August 1985 (aged 29)	63	(Japan) Suntory Sungoliath
Hisateru Hirashima	Prop	15 January 1983 (aged 32)	38	(Japan) Kobelco Steelers
Keita Inagaki	Prop	2 June 1990 (aged 25)	2	(Australia) Melbourne Rebels
Shinnosuke Kakinaga	Prop	19 December 1992 (aged 22)	3	(Japan) Suntory Sungoliath
Masataka Mikami	Prop	4 June 1988 (aged 27)	26	(Japan) Toshiba Brave Lupus
Hiroshi Yamashita	Prop	1 January 1986 (aged 29)	39	(Japan) Kobelco Steelers
Shoji Ito	Lock	2 December 1980 (aged 34)	32	(Japan) Kobelco Steelers
Shinya Makabe	Lock	26 March 1987 (aged 28)	29	(Japan) Suntory Sungoliath
Hitoshi Ono	Lock	6 May 1978 (aged 37)	87	(Japan) Toshiba Brave Lupus
Luke Thompson	Lock	16 April 1981 (aged 34)	53	(Japan) Kintetsu Liners
Kazuhiko Usami	Lock	17 March 1992 (aged 23)	3	(Japan) Canon Eagles
Michael Broadhurst	Flanker	30 October 1986 (aged 28)	16	(Japan) Ricoh Black Rams
Justin Ives	Flanker	24 May 1984 (aged 31)	27	(Japan) Canon Eagles
Michael Leitch	Flanker	7 October 1988 (aged 26)	38	(New Zealand) Chiefs
Tsuyoshi Murata	Flanker	15 December 1988 (aged 26)	3	(Japan) NEC Green Rockets
Hendrik Tui	Flanker	13 December 1987 (aged 27)	27	(Australia) Queensland Reds
Koliniasi Holani	Number 8	25 October 1981 (aged 33)	39	(Japan) Panasonic Wild Knights
Hayden Hopgood	Number 8	30 July 1980 (aged 34)	7	Unattached
Atsushi Hiwasa	Scrum-half	22 May 1987 (aged 28)	41	(Japan) Suntory Sungoliath
Fumiaki Tanaka	Scrum-half	3 January 1985 (aged 30)	44	(New Zealand) Highlanders
Keisuke Uchida	Scrum-half	22 February 1992 (aged 23)	8	(Japan) Panasonic Wild Knights
Kosei Ono	Fly-half	17 April 1987 (aged 28)	24	(Japan) Suntory Sungoliath
Yuu Tamura	Fly-half	9 January 1989 (aged 26)	30	(Japan) NEC Green Rockets
Harumichi Tatekawa	Fly-half	2 December 1989 (aged 25)	32	(Japan) Kubota Spears
Tim Bennetts	Centre	1 August 1990 (aged 24)	0	(Japan) Canon Eagles
Karne Hesketh	Centre	1 August 1985 (aged 29)	6	(Japan) Munakata Sanix Blues
Craig Wing	Centre	26 December 1979 (aged 35)	7	(Japan) Kobelco Steelers
Ryohei Yamanaka	Centre	22 June 1988 (aged 27)	3	(Japan) Kobelco Steelers
Yoshikazu Fujita	Wing	8 September 1993 (aged 21)	18	(Japan) Waseda University
Kenki Fukuoka	Wing	7 September 1992 (aged 22)	13	(Japan) Tsukuba University
Toshiaki Hirose	Wing	17 October 1981 (aged 33)	26	(Japan) Toshiba Brave Lupus
Kotaro Matsushima	Wing	26 February 1993 (aged 22)	6	(Australia) New South Wales Waratahs
Akihito Yamada	Wing	26 July 1985 (aged 29)	11	(Australia) Western Force
Ayumu Goromaru (c)	Fullback	1 March 1986 (aged 29)	47	(Japan) Yamaha Júbilo

=== Samoa ===
Samoa 30-man squad for the 2015 World Rugby Pacific Nations Cup.

Jack Lam was a late call up to the squad.

Note: Flags indicate national union for the club/province as defined by World Rugby.

Player	Position	Date of birth (age)	Caps	Club/province
Manu Leiataua	Hooker	26 December 1986 (aged 28)	5	(France) Aurillac
Motu Matu'u	Hooker	30 April 1987 (aged 28)	0	(New Zealand) Hurricanes
Andrew Williams	Hooker	20 June 1985 (aged 30)	9	(Samoa) Marist St. Joseph
Viliamu Afatia	Prop	24 May 1990 (aged 25)	7	(France) Agen
Jake Grey	Prop	17 February 1984 (aged 31)	1	(Samoa) SCOPA
James Johnston	Prop	6 March 1986 (aged 29)	14	(England) Wasps
Anthony Perenise	Prop	18 October 1982 (aged 32)	20	(England) Bristol
Sakaria Taulafo	Prop	29 January 1983 (aged 32)	32	(France) Stade Français
Fa'atiga Lemalu	Lock	17 April 1989 (aged 26)	12	(France) Bourgoin
Maselino Paulino	Lock	21 June 1988 (aged 27)	5	(New Zealand) Waikato
Filo Paulo	Lock	6 November 1987 (aged 27)	14	(Italy) Benetton Treviso
Joe Tekori	Lock	17 December 1983 (aged 31)	29	(France) Toulouse
Oneone Fa'afou	Flanker	2 June 1992 (aged 23)	1	(Samoa) Vaiala
Francis Ieremia	Flanker	17 November 1992 (aged 22)	0	(Samoa) Moata'a
Jack Lam	Flanker	18 November 1987 (aged 27)	12	(England) Bristol
Faifili Levave	Flanker	15 January 1986 (aged 29)	3	(Japan) Toyota Verblitz
TJ Ioane	Number 8	9 May 1989 (aged 26)	2	(England) Sale Sharks
Sanele Vavae Tuilagi	Number 8	15 June 1988 (aged 27)	0	(France) Carcassonne
Vavao Afemai	Scrum-half	18 February 1992 (aged 23)	2	(Samoa) Vaiala
Pele Cowley	Scrum-half	16 April 1993 (aged 22)	3	(New Zealand) Western Suburbs
Patrick Fa'apale	Fly-half	5 March 1991 (aged 24)	1	(Samoa) Vaiala
Michael Stanley	Fly-half	29 December 1989 (aged 25)	3	(Republic of Ireland) Ulster
Faialaga Afamasaga	Centre	5 March 1989 (aged 26)	1	(Samoa) SCOPA
Johnny Leota	Centre	21 January 1984 (aged 31)	16	(England) Sale Sharks
Paul Perez	Centre	26 July 1986 (aged 28)	8	(South Africa) Sharks
Alofa Alofa	Wing	12 March 1991 (aged 24)	2	(France) La Rochelle
Faleniu Iosi	Wing	28 May 1989 (aged 26)	0	(Samoa) Moata'a
Sinoti Sinoti	Wing	9 September 1985 (aged 29)	2	(England) Newcastle Falcons
Alesana Tuilagi (c)	Wing	24 February 1981 (aged 34)	30	(England) Newcastle Falcons
Fa'atoina Autagavaia	Fullback	18 September 1988 (aged 26)	13	(France) Nevers
Ahsee Tuala	Fullback	23 August 1989 (aged 25)	1	(England) Northampton Saints

=== Tonga ===
On the 22 June, head coach Mana Otai announced their 31-man squad for the 2015 World Rugby Pacific Nations Cup in Fiji and Canada. Five debutantes join a squad that draws on the experience of 2014's European Test squad, with familiar faces like Nili Latu returning to continue his string leadership role within the team.

Wayne Ngaluafe and Viliami Tahituʻa were called up for the Canada test.

Jack Ram was called up ahead of the USA test.

Note: Flags indicate national union for the club/province as defined by World Rugby.

Player	Position	Date of birth (age)	Caps	Club/province
Kalafi Pongi	Hooker	12 March 1993 (aged 22)	0	(New Zealand) Auckland
Sosefo Sakalia	Hooker	14 December 1991 (aged 23)	0	(Romania) CSM București
Elvis Taione	Hooker	25 May 1983 (aged 32)	13	(England) Exeter Chiefs
Halani Aulika	Prop	31 August 1983 (aged 31)	8	(England) London Irish
Siua Halanukonuka	Prop	9 August 1986 (aged 28)	1	(France) Narbonne
Tevita Mailau	Prop	25 April 1985 (aged 30)	13	(France) Perpignan
Sila Puafisi	Prop	15 April 1988 (aged 27)	13	(England) Gloucester
Sona Taumalolo	Prop	13 November 1981 (aged 33)	13	(France) Grenoble
Soane Tongaʻuiha	Prop	21 January 1982 (aged 33)	13	(France) Oyonnax
Uili Koloʻofai	Lock	29 September 1982 (aged 32)	1	(England) Newcastle Falcons
Tukulua Lokotui	Lock	31 December 1979 (aged 35)	21	(France) Béziers Hérault
Steve Mafi	Lock	9 December 1989 (aged 25)	10	(Australia) Western Force
Joe Tuineau	Lock	18 August 1981 (aged 33)	18	(France) Lyon
Viliami Fihaki	Flanker	17 January 1987 (aged 28)	5	(England) Sale Sharks
Nili Latu (c)	Flanker	19 February 1982 (aged 33)	36	(England) Newcastle Falcons
Jack Ram	Flanker	14 January 1987 (aged 28)	0	(New Zealand) Blues
Hale T-Pole	Flanker	30 April 1979 (aged 36)	26	(New Zealand) Otago
Opeti Fonua	Number 8	26 May 1986 (aged 29)	5	(England) Leicester Tigers
Viliami Maʻafu	Number 8	9 March 1982 (aged 33)	21	(France) Oyonnax
Sosefo Maʻake	Scrum-half	15 September 1991 (aged 23)	0	(Tonga) Havelu Bulldogs
Taniela Moa	Scrum-half	3 November 1985 (aged 29)	20	(France) Pau
Wayne Ngaluafe	Scrum-half	13 October 1988 (aged 26)	0	(New Zealand) Auckland
Sonatane Takulua	Scrum-half	1 November 1991 (aged 23)	5	(England) Newcastle Falcons
Latiume Fosita	Fly-half	25 July 1992 (aged 22)	8	(England) Doncaster Knights
Kurt Morath	Fly-half	13 November 1984 (aged 30)	21	(France) Biarritz Olympique
Martin Naufahu	Fly-half	8 July 1990 (aged 25)	0	(Australia) Melbourne Rising
Alipate Fatafehi	Centre	13 December 1984 (aged 30)	17	(France) Colomiers
Sione Piukala	Centre	8 June 1985 (aged 30)	10	(France) Perpignan
Siale Piutau	Centre	13 October 1985 (aged 29)	19	(Japan) Yamaha Júbilo
Viliami Tahituʻa	Centre	10 December 1992 (age 33)	0	(New Zealand) Northland
Otulea Katoa	Wing	26 April 1991 (aged 24)	3	(Scotland) Edinburgh
Fetuʻu Vainikolo	Wing	30 January 1985 (aged 30)	17	(France) Oyonnax
Telusa Veainu	Wing	26 December 1990 (aged 24)	0	(Australia) Melbourne Rebels
Vunga Lilo	Fullback	28 February 1983 (aged 32)	33	(France) Montauban

=== United States ===
United States 32-man squad for the 2015 World Rugby Pacific Nations Cup.

Inaki Basauri, John Cullen, Tom Coolican, Lemoto Filikitonga, Ben Landry, Chad London, Samu Manoa, Tim Maupin, Ronnie McLean, Louis Mulholland, Zachary Pangelinan, Robbie Shaw, Mike Shepherd, Tim Stanfill, Kyle Sumsion, Matt Trouville, Tai Tuisamoa and Nicholas Wallace were all in the 2015 Rugby World Cup training squad, but was not selected for the final PNC squad.

Tim Stanfill and Nicholas Wallace were added to the main squad ahead of the round 3 clash with Tonga.

Note: Flags indicate national union for the club/province as defined by World Rugby.

Player	Position	Date of birth (age)	Caps	Club/province
Zach Fenoglio	Hooker	July 29, 1989 (aged 25)	7	(United States) Glendale Raptors
Phil Thiel	Hooker	October 29, 1984 (aged 30)	26	(United States) Life University
Chris Baumann	Prop	May 18, 1987 (aged 28)	0	(United States) Santa Monica
Eric Fry	Prop	September 14, 1987 (aged 27)	27	(England) Newcastle Falcons
Olive Kilifi	Prop	September 28, 1986 (aged 28)	10	(United States) Seattle Saracens
Titi Lamositele	Prop	February 11, 1995 (aged 20)	8	(England) Saracens
Matekitonga Moeakiola	Prop	May 16, 1978 (aged 37)	29	(France) Castenet
Nicholas Wallace	Prop	October 16, 1989 (age 36)	14	(United States) Glendale Raptors
Greg Peterson	Lock	March 26, 1991 (aged 24)	3	(Scotland) Glasgow Warriors
Hayden Smith	Lock	April 10, 1985 (aged 30)	22	(England) Saracens
Louis Stanfill	Lock	May 30, 1985 (aged 30)	51	(United States) Seattle Saracens
Todd Clever	Flanker	January 16, 1983 (aged 32)	63	(United States) OMBAC
Andrew Durutalo	Flanker	October 25, 1987 (aged 27)	3	(United States) USA Sevens
Scott LaValla	Flanker	July 4, 1988 (aged 27)	29	(France) Stade Français
Alastair McFarland	Flanker	June 2, 1989 (age 37)	0	(United States) NYAC
John Quill	Flanker	March 10, 1990 (aged 25)	10	(United States) NYAC
Danny Barrett	Number 8	March 23, 1990 (aged 25)	4	(United States) USA Sevens
Cam Dolan	Number 8	March 7, 1990 (aged 25)	10	(Wales) Cardiff Blues
Niku Kruger	Scrum-half	October 9, 1991 (age 34)	0	(United States) Kutztown Golden Bears
Mike Petri	Scrum-half	August 16, 1984 (aged 30)	48	(United States) NYAC
Toby L'Estrange	Fly-half	September 2, 1988 (aged 26)	12	(United States) NYAC
AJ MacGinty	Fly-half	February 26, 1990 (age 36)	0	(United States) Life University
Shalom Suniula	Fly-half	May 6, 1988 (aged 27)	9	(United States) Seattle Saracens
Seamus Kelly	Centre	May 30, 1991 (aged 24)	15	(United States) SFGG
Folau Niua	Centre	January 27, 1985 (aged 30)	12	(United States) USA Sevens
Thretton Palamo	Centre	September 22, 1988 (aged 26)	5	(England) London Welsh
Andrew Suniula	Centre	September 29, 1987 (aged 27)	33	(Romania) CSM București
Takudzwa Ngwenya	Wing	July 22, 1985 (aged 29)	29	(France) Biarritz Olympique
Blaine Scully (vc)	Wing	February 29, 1988 (aged 27)	21	(Wales) Cardiff Blues
Tim Stanfill	Wing	April 7, 1989 (age 37)	4	(United States) Seattle Saracens
Brett Thompson	Wing	August 17, 1990 (aged 24)	2	(United States) USA Sevens
Zack Test	Wing	October 13, 1989 (aged 25)	0	(United States) USA Sevens
Troy Hall	Fullback	May 16, 1982 (aged 33)	2	(United States) NYAC
Chris Wyles (c)	Fullback	September 13, 1983 (aged 31)	45	(England) Saracens

== See also ==
- 2015 mid-year rugby union internationals
- 2015 Rugby World Cup warm-up matches
