= Sosefo =

Sosefo is a given name. Notable people with the given name include:

- Sosefo Fifita (born 2003), New Zealand rugby league player
- Sosefo Ma'ake (born 1991), Tongan rugby union player
- Sosefo Mautāmakia I (died 1933), king of Uvea
- Sosefo Mautāmakia II (r. 1916–1918), king of Uvea
- Sosefo Panuve (born 1987), Wallisian athlete
- Sosefo Sakalia (born 1991), Tongan rugby union player
- Sosefo Suve (fl. 2012), Wallisian politician
- Sosefo Feʻaomoeata Vakata (born 1969), Tongan politician
