= Maʻake =

Maʻake is a given name and surname. Notable people with the name include:

- Maʻake Kemoeatu (born 1979), Tongan-American football player
- Sosefo Ma'ake (born 1991), Tongan rugby union player
