= Pennant Hills High School =

Location
- New South Wales; Australia; 33°44′0″S 151°3′38″E

Information
- Type: secondary, co-educational, day school
- Motto: Latin: Nil Nisi Bonum (Nothing but the best)
- Established: 1966
- Principal: Ross Warren
- Enrolment: ~1270
- Campus: Suburban
- Colours: Red, blue and white
- Website: pennanthil-h.schools.nsw.gov.au

Pennant Hills High School is a government, comprehensive, co-educational, high school situated in the northern suburb of Pennant Hills in Sydney, New South Wales, Australia, about 15–20 minutes to walk from Pennant Hills railway station. Established in 1966, the school had a student population of 1,270 students as of 2004, and has generally maintained these student numbers. The street address is Boundary Road, but all vehicular access is via Laurence Street.

== Educational structure ==
Pennant Hills High School offers many subjects, with the faculties including Social Sciences, Science, Agriculture, English, Music, Christian Education, History, Maths, Visual Arts, Industrial Arts or TAS, Languages and Physical Education. PHHS also contains a Special Education system, helping physically and intellectually challenged students.

== Physical buildings and grounds ==
Pennant Hills High School contains a multi-purpose centre (Robert Stacey Hall), new Design and Technology/Visual Arts buildings, the Alfred Gray Memorial Library, and many specialty rooms including science labs, cooking and computer rooms. It also has two fields for sports such as football, rugby and cricket. An agricultural plot is located at the rear of the school, housing crops, sheep, chickens and other livestock.

The school's buildings were constructed according to the hilly terrain of the area, so that there are no more than two levels at any single point. PHHS has 4 levels, and room numbers are determined by which level it is in: Level 1 is primarily Social Sciences (Business Studies, Geography etc.), as well as Textiles rooms. Level 2 has Language, Agriculture, Science, Food Technology, and Drama, while Level 3 (located at the Laurence Street level) is where the main quad of the school is located, along with the library and reception. It too, has Science rooms, as well as Maths, History, and Wood/Metal Technology ooms. Level 4 is primarily English, History, Maths and Visual Arts classrooms. The Industrial and Visual Arts building (completed in 2005) has two main entry points, from the Garden Quad (in Level 3) and through a pedestrian bridge on Level 4.

The school suffered from a fire on 11 June 2001, destroying the school administration building, Industrial Arts Block, and the English, History, Mathematics and Visual Arts staffrooms.

As is commonly the case with such school fires, many student works (notably Visual and Industrial arts HSC projects) were destroyed, causing considerable distress among affected students. Also as a result of this fire, many portable classrooms were set up for a number of years, near the main oval and where the COLA (Covered Outdoor Learning Area) is now situated. It is estimated that for at least 3 years there could have been up to 20–25 portables (this has not been confirmed). What we do know is that in 2005, the number of portables decreased, down to eight. In 2006, after the completion of the COLA and the new TAS/VA block, four of these were removed. Now (as of April 2009) these four remain. Three of these are used by English mainly. The other one is used for Special Education, as it has wheelchair access. Operation Phoenix Rising oversaw the completion of the rebuilding effort to be completed in 2012. In early 2018 2 of the Science portable rooms were removed from the school, these were located on the bottom level of the school. Currently (as of June 2018) there are 2 remaining portable rooms which are used by the Special Education Department, these 2 portables are currently located next to the COLA with a wheelchair access ramp. As of 2023, there are no remaining portables.

The school now has had a lift installed between levels 2 and 4 (for use by disabled or injured students), and a new Design and Technology and Visual Arts building. In 2005, a new Covered Outdoor Learning Area (COLA) was constructed, and in 2022, crickets nets were constructed.

The Agriculture area is fondly known as the "Ag Plot" or the "Farm" and consists of several small paddocks, an area for growing plants, a machinery shed, a tool shed, a greenhouse and another shed that stores seeds and the like.

== Notable alumni ==
- Ray Barber, politician
- Tim Bennetts, rugby union player
- John Faulkner, former Senator
- Lisa Ho, fashion designer
- Verity James, television and radio presenter

== See also ==
- List of Government schools in New South Wales
