= Callum Morrison =

Canada international rugby union player

- Born: November 28, 1985 (age 40) British Columbia, Canada
- Height: 6 ft 4 in (193 cm)
- Weight: 233 lb (106 kg)

Rugby union career
- Position: Flanker / Lock
International career
Years	Team	Apps	(Points)
2015–16	Canada	5	(0)

Callum Morrison (born November 28, 1985) is a Canadian former international rugby union player.

Born in British Columbia, Morrison played his rugby with Meraloma, UBC Old Boys Ravens and the BC Bears, captaining the latter in the Canadian Rugby Championship. He was a forward, used in either the second or back row.

Morrison made his debut for Canada against Japan at the 2015 World Rugby Pacific Nations Cup, where he was capped three times off the bench. He gained a further two caps at the 2016 Americas Rugby Championship as a starting lock.

== See also ==
- List of Canada national rugby union players
