= Sonny Tonga'uiha =

Sonny Tongaʻuiha
- Born: 1 August 2006 (age 20) Northampton, England
- Height: 1.93 m (6 ft 4 in)
- Weight: 135 kg (21 st 4 lb; 298 lb)
- School: Northampton School for Boys
- Notable relative(s): Soane Tongaʻuiha (father); Hudson Tongaʻuiha (uncle)

Rugby union career
- Position: Prop
- Current team: Northampton Saints
Senior career
Years	Team	Apps	(Points)
2024–	Northampton Saints	3	(0)
- Correct as of 19 January 2026
International career
Years	Team	Apps	(Points)
2024	England U18		
2026–	England U20	10	(5)

Sonny Tonga’uiha (born 1 August 2006) is an English professional rugby union footballer who plays as a prop forward for Northampton Saints.

== Early life ==
He attended the Northampton School for Boys. He joined the Northampton Saints at under-14 level and went on to play for the Saints’ U18 side that reached the 2023-24 Premiership Rugby Academy League final.

== Club career ==
In May 2024, he joined the Northampton Saints senior academy ahead of the 2024-25 season. He made his professional debut on 1 November 2024 in the Premiership Rugby Cup against Leicester Tigers. To mark the occasion he was awarded his jersey by his father, a former Saints player himself, in a presentation.

== International career ==
He was involved with England at under-18 level in 2024. He was a try scorer for England U20 against Wales U20 in the 2026 U20 Six Nations on 6 February 2026. He continued with the side and featured at the 2026 World Rugby Junior World Championship.

== Personal life ==
He is the son of Tongan former rugby union international player Soane Tongaʻuiha.
