= Levani Botia =

Fiji international rugby union player

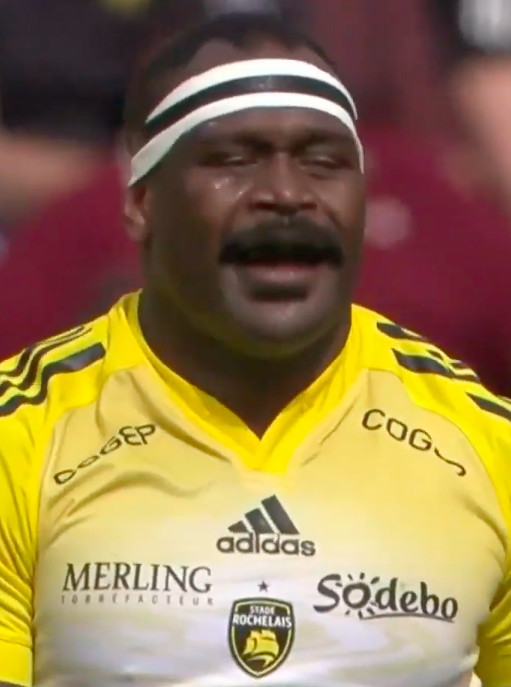
- Botia playing for La Rochelle in 2023
- Born: Levani Botia Veivuke; 14 March 1989 (age 37) Naitasiri, Fiji
- Height: 1.82 m (6 ft 0 in)
- Weight: 106 kg (16 st 10 lb; 234 lb)

Rugby union career
- Position(s): Centre, Flanker, Wing
- Current team: La Rochelle
Senior career
Years	Team	Apps	(Points)
2014−	La Rochelle	199	(200)
- Correct as of 30 April 2024
International career
Years	Team	Apps	(Points)
2014–	Fiji	30	(30)
- Correct as of 30 April 2024
National sevens team
Years	Team		Comps
2011–2014	Fiji		65

Levani Botia (born 14 March 1989 in Naitasiri) is a Fijian rugby union footballer. Nicknamed "Demolition Man", he plays centre, flanker and wing for La Rochelle and his national team, Fiji.

== Career ==
Botia worked as a prison officer, it was then that he got a chance to play for the Warden's 7's team in a local competition. He never told his wife that he played rugby professionally until she saw him one day on TV playing at the 2011 Pacific Games in New Caledonia.

He did not go to high school as he left school after finishing class eight to focus on his rugby career. He left for Suva after a few years and there he played for the Suva development side before playing for City Eagles. He was spotted one day by former Fiji 7's coach Waisale Serevi who included him in the sevens team to the 2011 Pacific Games. After returning, he was included in the Fiji team for the 2012–13 IRB Sevens World Series; an injury ruled him out for most of the season but he was included in the Fiji team for the 2013 Rugby World Cup Sevens. Botia also played in the Digicel Cup for his province, Namosi and he even took his side to the semi-final in 2013. He captained the national 7's team in some tournaments.

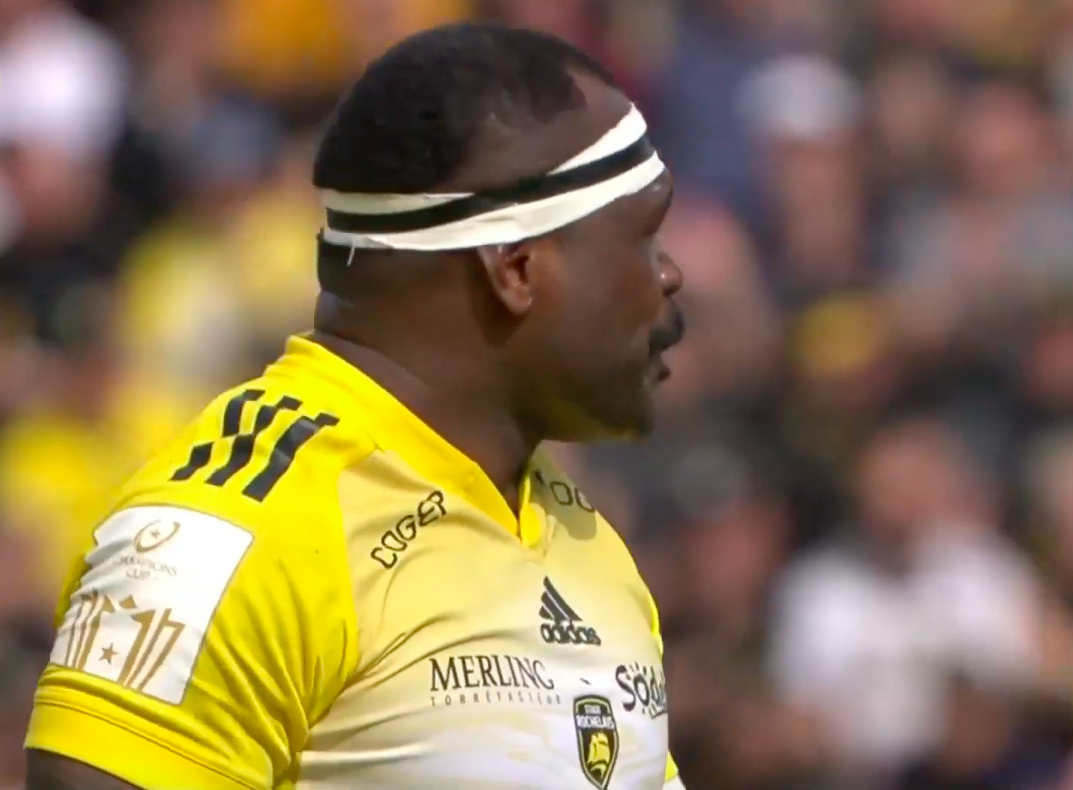
Botia playing for La Rochelle in 2023

In February 2014, he joined French Pro D2 rugby side, La Rochelle.

=== Fiji national team (15s) ===
He made his International debut for the Fiji against Portugal and scored a try on debut. He then played again for Fiji a week later against the Barbarians, a centennial match for Fiji to celebrate 100 years of rugby in Fiji.

He then joined the team a year later when they played France, starting at inside centre.

In June 2015, he was included in the Fiji team to play in the 2015 World Rugby Pacific Nations Cup. He set up one of the tries of the year when he regathered a kick and set off on one of his trademark runs and then bumped off two Tongan players to set up a try for Henry Seniloli.

He was included in the final 31-member squad to the 2015 Rugby World Cup.

He was also selected for the 2019 Rugby World Cup squad and the 33-member squad for the 2023 Rugby World Cup.

== Career statistics ==
- Test debut - Portugal v Fiji at Lisbon, Nov 9, 2013
- Latest Test - England v Fiji at Marseille, Oct 15, 2023

== Honours ==
La Rochelle

- 2× European Rugby Champions Cup: 2022, 2023
- 1× European Rugby Champions Cup runner-up: 2021
- 1× European Rugby Challenge Cup runner-up: 2019
- 1× Top 14 runner-up: 2021
