= Tim Bennetts =

Japan international rugby union player

- Born: 1 August 1990 (age 36) Sydney, Australia
- Height: 1.83 m (6 ft 0 in)
- Weight: 96 kg (15 st 2 lb; 212 lb)
- School: Pennant Hills High School

Rugby union career
- Position: Centre
Senior career
Years	Team	Apps	(Points)
2012–2019	Canon Eagles	65	(115)
2020–2021	Munakata Sanix Blues	11	(15)
2022–2024	NEC Green Rockets	28	(20)
- Correct as of 21 February 2021
International career
Years	Team	Apps	(Points)
2015–2016	Japan	5	(0)
- Correct as of 21 February 2021

Tim Bennetts (born 1 August 1990) is an Australian-born Japanese international rugby union player who plays as a centre. He currently plays for the Canon Eagles in Japan's domestic Top League.

== Early / provincial career ==
Bennetts was born and raised in Sydney, where he attended Pennant Hills High School. He started playing Top League rugby in Japan with the Canon Eagles in 2012 and has been a regular starter for them over the past 4 seasons.

== International ==
Bennetts made his international debut for his adopted country, Japan, in a world cup warm-up match against Canada in San Jose, California on 18 July 2015. He did not make the squad for the tournament, but became more of a regular the following year, starting all 3 matches during the 2016 mid-year rugby union internationals series.
