= Viliamu Afatia =

Samoan rugby union player

- Born: Viliamu Afatia; 24 May 1990 (age 36) Vaiala, Samoa
- Height: 1.80 m (5 ft 11 in)
- Weight: 124 kg (19 st 7 lb; 273 lb)

Rugby union career
- Position: Prop
Senior career
Years	Team	Apps	(Points)
2011–2016	Agen	75	(10)
2016–2018	Racing 92	50	(5)
2018–2019	Bordeaux Bègles	8	(0)
2019–	Bayonne	16	(0)
- Correct as of 30 November 2019
International career
Years	Team	Apps	(Points)
2012–	Samoa	21	(0)
- Correct as of 25 October 2018

Viliamu Afatia (born 24 May 1990) is a Samoan rugby union player. He joined Agen ahead of the 2011/2012 season. He plays prop for Samoa on international level. Afatia also plays for Bordeaux Bègles in their Top 14 campaign.

Viliamu Afatia made his debut for Samoa coming off the bench against Tonga in the 2012 IRB Pacific Nations Cup. Afatia then was named in the Samoan squad for their 2012 end-of-year rugby union test matches against Canada, Wales and France. In 2015, he was selected for the 2015 Rugby World Cup.
