= Tevita Mailau =

- Born: Tevita Mailau; 25 April 1985 (age 41) Sydney, Australia
- Height: 1.85 m (6 ft 1 in)
- Weight: 115 kg (18 st 2 lb; 254 lb)
- School: Wesley College

Rugby union career
- Position: Loosehead Prop
- Current team: USA Perpignan
Senior career
Years	Team	Apps	(Points)
2012–15	Mont de Marsan	54	(5)
2015–18	Perpignan	58	(0)
- Correct as of 30 December 2019 @ 16:20:52PM (AEST)
Provincial / State sides
Years	Team	Apps	(Points)
2007–08	Northland	2	(0)
2008–12	Auckland	41	(15)
- Correct as of 24 August 2015
Super Rugby
Years	Team	Apps	(Points)
2009-2012	Blues	38	(10)
- Correct as of 25 July 2012
International career
Years	Team	Apps	(Points)
2012–	Tonga	21	(0)
- Correct as of 26 November 2016

Tevita Mailau (born 25 April 1985 in Sydney, Australia) is a rugby union player who plays for Stade Montois in the Top 14 and Tonga internationally. He previously played for the Auckland Blues in Super Rugby and Auckland in the ITM Cup.

== Career ==
=== Domestic Rugby ===
Mailau made his debut for Auckland in 2006 in a game against Fiji Warriors in Lautoka. The following season he spent a full year as a loan player with the Northland Taniwha playing all eleven games including two starts. His 2008 season was spent between both Northland and Auckland where he spent four weeks as a loan player before returning to Auckland.

2009 saw Mailau make his Super 14 debut for the Blues in their Round Two 59–26 loss to the Bulls in Pretoria. In 2012, after making 38 Blues appearances, he signed with Stade Montois of the Top 14.

=== Representative career ===
Mailau has the distinction of being able to play either loosehead or tighthead prop. He has represented New Zealand at both Secondary Schools and under 21 level. He made his international debut for Tonga in 2012.
