= Pele Cowley =

Samoan international rugby union player

- Full name: Pelefofaga Z. Cowley
- Born: 16 April 1993 (age 33) Auckland, New Zealand
- Height: 1.75 m (5 ft 9 in)
- Weight: 85 kg (13 st 5 lb; 187 lb)
- School: Mount Albert Grammar School
- Notable relative(s): Sean Maitland, cousin

Rugby union career
- Position: Halfback
- Current team: Waikato
Senior career
Years	Team	Apps	(Points)
2015	Counties Manukau	4	(5)
2016–2017	Waikato	14	(0)
2016/2017	Cardiff Blues	5	(5)
2020	Counties Manukau	3	(0)
2020-	Austin Gilgronis	11	(10)
- Correct as of 2 June 2021
International career
Years	Team	Apps	(Points)
2014–	Samoa	14	(5)
- Correct as of 2 June 2021

Pele Cowley (born 16 April 1993) is a Samoan international rugby union player who currently plays as a halfback for Waikato in New Zealand's domestic Mitre 10 Cup. He also plays for the Austin Gilgronis of Major League Rugby (MLR) in the United States.

== Senior career ==
Cowley originally came up through the club ranks in Auckland before earning his first provincial recognition with the Pukekohe-based, Counties Manukau Steelers in 2015. He switched provinces in 2016, playing club rugby with Hamilton Old Boys as well as making 5 appearances for Waikato in the 2016 Mitre 10 Cup.

== International ==
Cowley was still an Auckland club player when he received his first senior call up from Samoa in 2014. He debuted as a second-half substitute in a 24–13 defeat against Italy in Ascoli Piceno on 8 November 2014.
