= Vavao Afemai =

Samoan rugby union player

- Born: 18 February 1992 (age 34) Motootua, Samoa
- Height: 1.68 m (5 ft 6 in)
- Weight: 65 kg (143 lb)
- School: Avele College

Rugby union career
- Position: Scrum-half
International career
Years	Team	Apps	(Points)
2015–	Samoa	8	(0)
- Correct as of 10 October 2015
National sevens team
Years	Team		Comps
2013–14	Samoa		6
- Correct as of 20 September 2015

Vavao Afemai (born 18 February 1992) is a Samoan rugby union player. He was named in Samoa's squad for the 2015 Rugby World Cup. He plays as a scrum-half.
