= Soane Tongaʻuiha =

Tonga international rugby union player

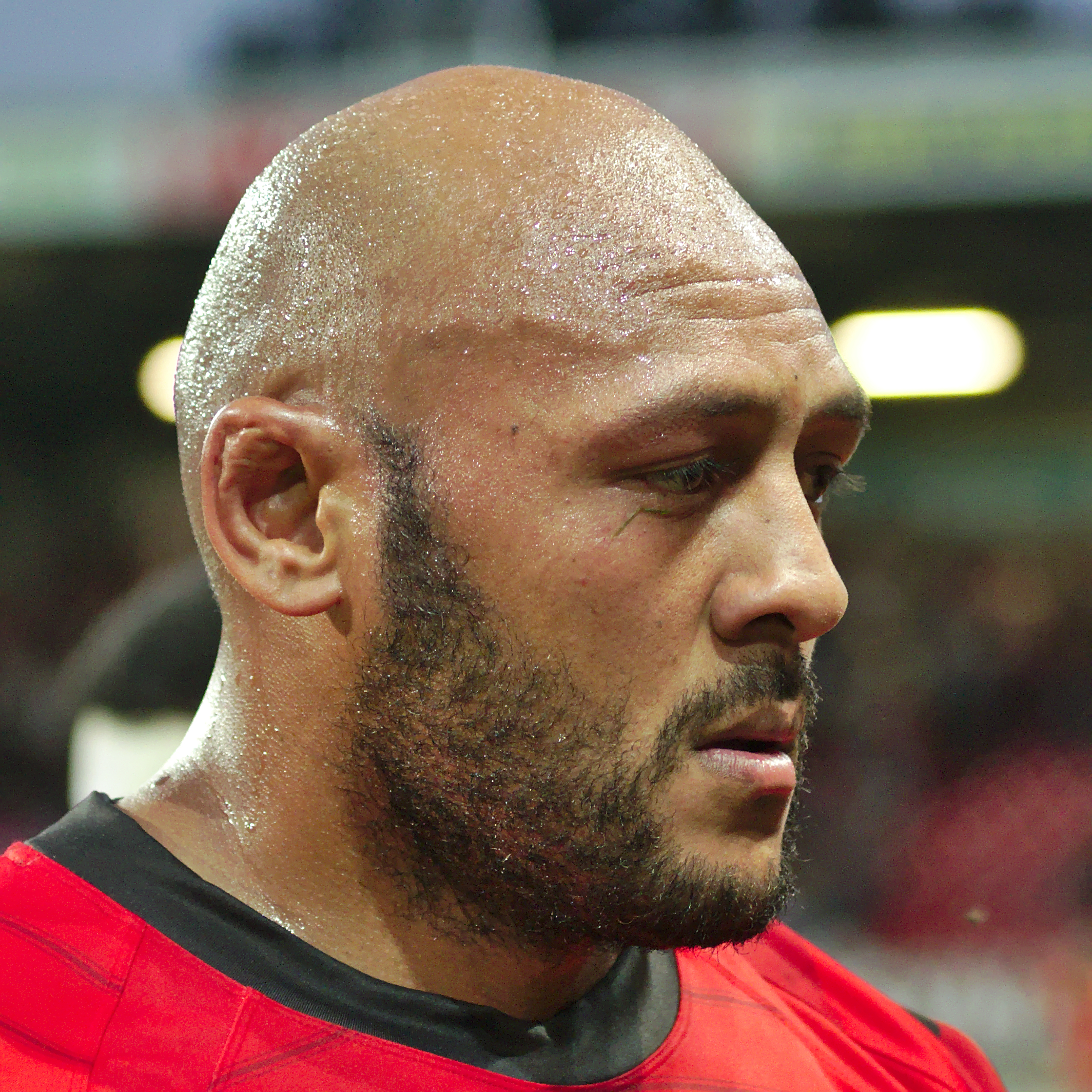
- Born: Soane Tongaʻuiha; 21 January 1982 (age 44) Houma, Tonga
- Height: 1.91 m (6 ft 3 in)
- Weight: 130 kg (20 st 7 lb; 290 lb)
- School: St Peter's College
- Notable relative: Hudson Tongaʻuiha (brother)

Rugby union career
- Position: Prop
Amateur team(s)
Years	Team	Apps	(Points)
- Ponsonby
Senior career
Years	Team	Apps	(Points)
2001–05	Auckland	4	(0)
2004-06	Bedford Blues	49	(5)
2006–13	Northampton Saints	184	(115)
2013–14	Racing Métro	14	(0)
2014–16	Oyonnax	28	(10)
2016-18	Bristol Rugby	20	(10)
2018-20	Ampthill		
2020–22	Chinnor		
2022-26	Banbury		
- Correct as of 13 July 2025
International career
Years	Team	Apps	(Points)
2001	New Zealand U19		
2003	New Zealand U21		
2004	Pacific Islanders	3	(0)
2004–15	Tonga	18	(5)
- Correct as of 13 July 2025

Soane Tongaʻuiha (born 21 January 1982) is a Tongan-born, New Zealand-educated, rugby union player and coach. His longest stint was spent with the Northampton Saints, with whom he formed a formidable reputation and rose to prominence, becoming a fan favourite. He has played internationally for Tonga. His position of choice is loose-head prop, although he sometimes plays at tight-head. He is known for his large size and fierce runs.

== Club career ==
Tongaʻuiha moved from Tonga to Auckland, New Zealand with his family at the age of eight. At first, in Auckland, he played rugby league. He played rugby union from the age of 15 when he went to St Peter's College, Auckland the same Catholic school attended by Pat Lam who also taught there. In his final year at school, in 2000, the team went through the season undefeated, winning the Auckland Championship and the New Zealand First XV Knock out competition. The team was inspired by Pat Lam. In 2001, Tongaʻuiha joined the Ponsonby rugby club in Auckland where he was selected for the Auckland Colts side, playing one game against Japan. Tongaʻuiha was selected for the Auckland team in 2002 and 2003, playing 12 games and scoring one try.

He first made his break at Bedford Blues as he shone in the 2005/06 season, helping Bedford to a second-place finish behind rugby giants Harlequins, and a Powergen Trophy final place. This, combined with his mobile aggressive ball-carrying, caused Northampton Saints to consider using him. He had also scored a try against Saints in Northampton's victory over Bedford Blues in the Powergen Cup game in December 2004.

Tongaʻuiha moved to Northampton Saints at the start of the 2006/07 season and at first – being behind Scotland and British & Irish Lions legend Tom Smith- did not have too many starts in the Guinness Premiership. However, in the 2007/08 season, when Saints found themselves in National League 1, he excelled and earned a number of first team appearances as Northampton Saints cruised towards promotion at the end of the season.

This upward trend in performances continued into the 2008/09 season when – combined with Tom Smith's move towards coaching – Tongaʻuiha cemented his place in the match-day squad and has had his fair share of appearances in the starting XV. Tongaʻuiha became something of a crowd favourite at Franklin's Gardens, earning the nickname 'Tiny' – an ironic take on his size.

On 27 January 2010, it was announced that Tongaʻuiha would join Saracens at the start of the 2010/11 season. However, in April 2010, he changed his mind and signed a new three-year contract with the Saints.

Tongaʻuiha left the Saints at the end of the season 2012–2013 to join the Top 14 Paris club Racing Metro. On 16 May 2014, Soane left Racing Metro to join Top 14 rivals Oyonnax from the 2014–15 season.

On 30 June 2016, Tongaʻuiha returned to England to join new Aviva Premiership side Bristol Rugby on a two-year deal, prior to the 2016–17 season.

He was released by Bristol in April 2018. Shortly after Tongaʻuiha took up a player–coach role at Ampthill RUFC. Ampthill were promoted to the Championship at the end of the 2018–19 season.

In August 2020 it was confirmed that Tongaʻuiha had signed for National League 1 side Chinnor as a player/coach.

In the summer of 2022 he moved to Banbury RUFC, where he has since navigated them to 4 steady seasons in regional 1 (level 5) rugby.

== International career ==
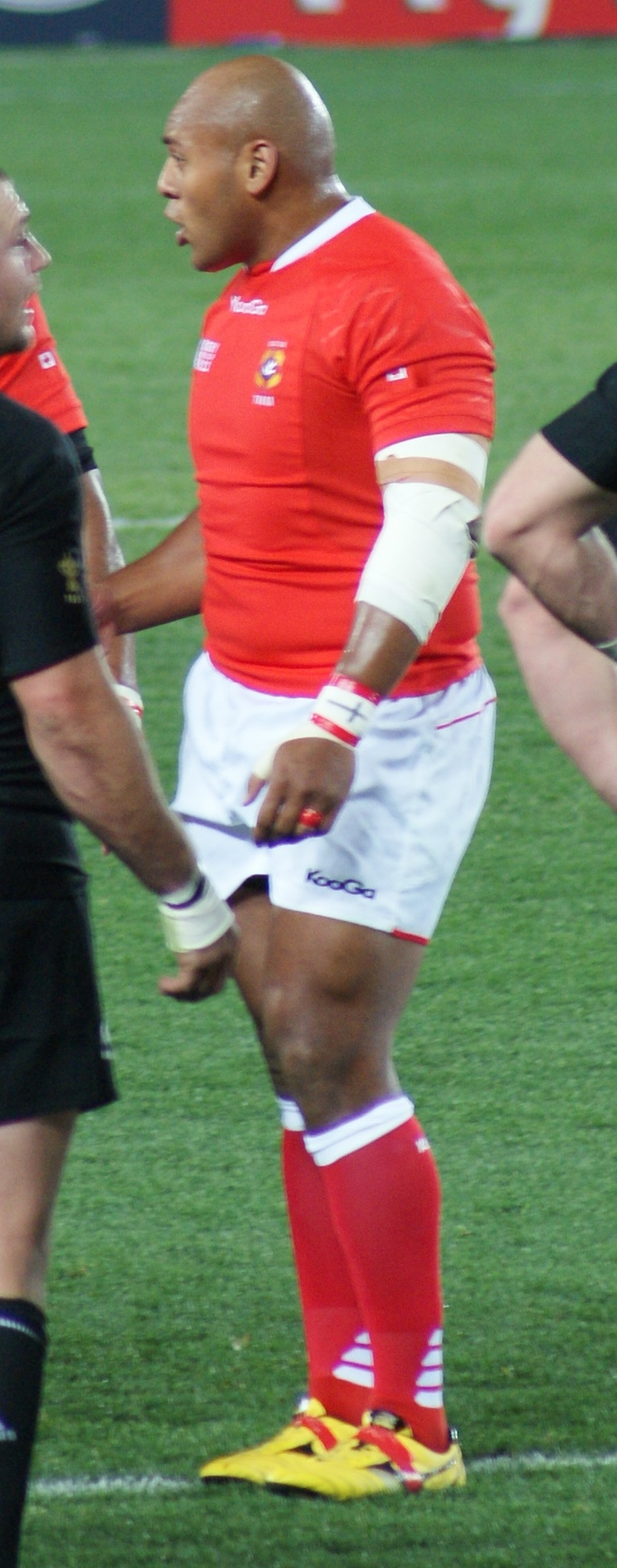
Tongaʻuiha during the 2011 Rugby World Cup

=== New Zealand ===
Tongaʻuiha played for the New Zealand under 19 team in 2001, winning the World Cup.

In 2003, he was selected for the New Zealand under 21 team and again won the applicable age grade World Cup.

=== Tonga ===
Tongaʻuiha's international career began in 2004 with selection to the newly formed Pacific Islanders rugby union team, a composite team made up of the best players from Samoa, Fiji and Tonga.

His career stalled after that as being a professional playing in Europe restricted him from summer tests for his native Tonga. His sights had been firmly set on the 2007 Rugby World Cup to be held in France – ensuring his and other seasoned professionals playing Europe's participation.

In 2007, he travelled to France as part of the Tongan national rugby team to take part in the 2007 Rugby World Cup, playing in all four games as Tonga upset the form book, beating the US and arch rivals Samoa and pushing eventual winners South Africa and runners-up England all the way. By the end of the tournament, Tongaʻuiha had seven caps for Tonga.

Tongaʻuiha was again part of his country's World Cup squad for the 2011 event, starting in three and featuring in all four of Tonga's matches, including the impressive 19–14 win in their final game over runners-up France.

== Personal life ==
His son Sonny Tonga'uiha made his debut for Northampton Saints in 2024.
