= Scott LaValla =

US international rugby union player

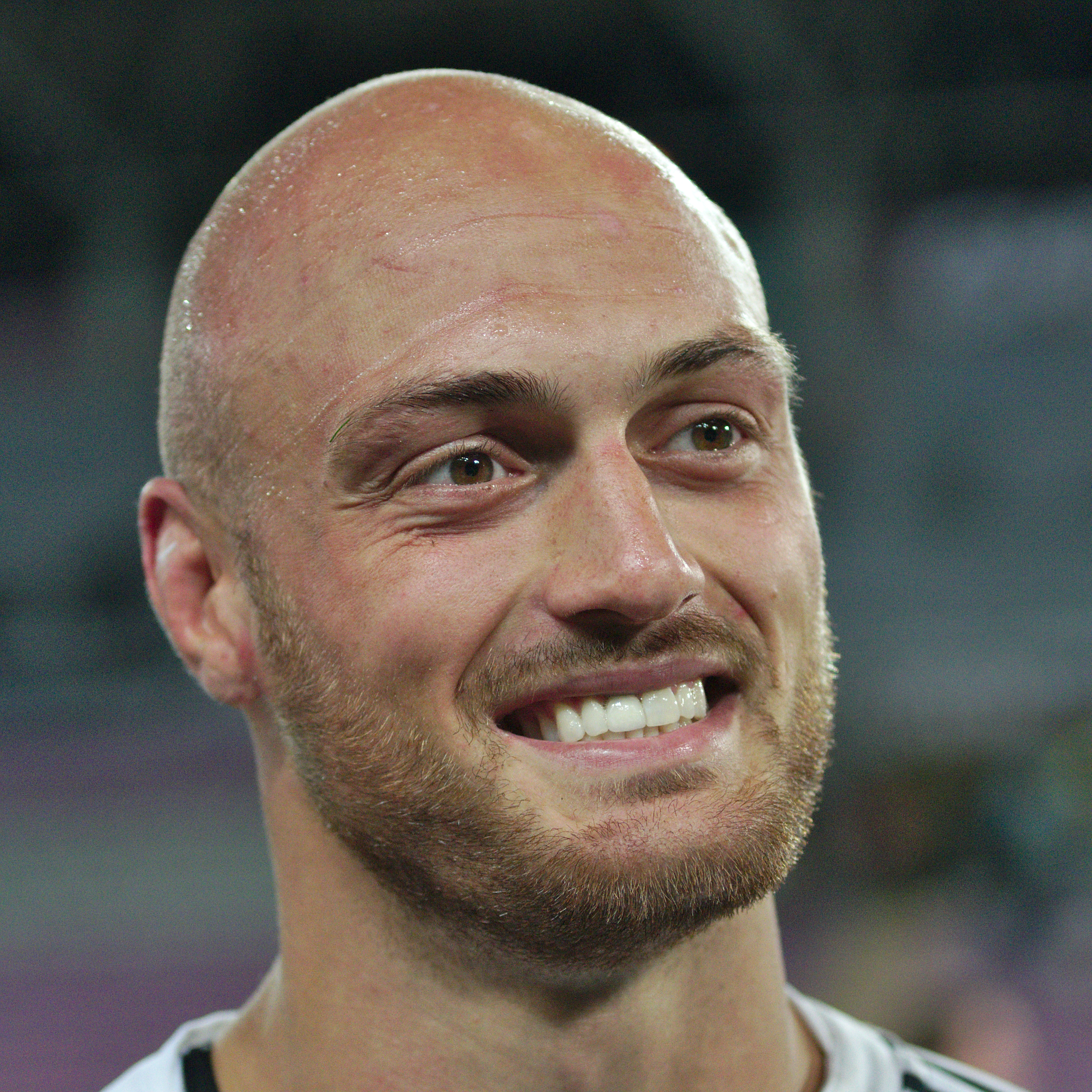
- Scott LaValla, 2014
- Born: Scott Coble LaValla; July 4, 1988 (age 38) Olympia, Washington, United States
- Height: 1.97 m (6 ft 5 1/2 in)
- Weight: 117 kg (18 st 6 lb; 258 lb)
- School: North Thurston High School
- University: Trinity College, Dublin
- Occupation: Professional rugby union player

Rugby union career
- Position(s): Lock, Flanker, No.8
Amateur team(s)
Years	Team	Apps	(Points)
2007–2011	Dublin University		
2009–2010	Ulster Ravens		
- Correct as of 28 February 2014
Senior career
Years	Team	Apps	(Points)
2011–2015	Stade Français	82	(5)
- Correct as of 6 June 2015
International career
Years	Team	Apps	(Points)
2007	United States U-19s	4	(0)
2008	United States U-20s	5	(0)
2010–2015	United States	33	(5)
- Correct as of 4 August 2015

Scott LaValla (born July 4, 1988, in Olympia WA) is a retired American rugby union player. LaValla played lock for Stade Français in the Top 14 from 2011 until his retirement in 2015.

== Early life ==
Scott first started playing rugby at age 16. He attended North Thurston High School in Lacey, WA. He went on to play for the Budd Bay Barbarians U-19 team and then the Pacific NW Loggers U-19.

Scott represented the Ulster Ravens during the 2009–10 season.

LaValla played his club rugby for Dublin University Football Club (the Trinity College Dublin rugby club) and was elected Club Captain for the 2010–2011 season. He led his side to a 31–22 win in the annual Dublin Universities Colours match over University College Dublin R.F.C., and led DUFC to victory in the 2010–2011 club rugby sevens tournament. LaValla studied Philosophy and Political Science while at Trinity College Dublin.

== International ==
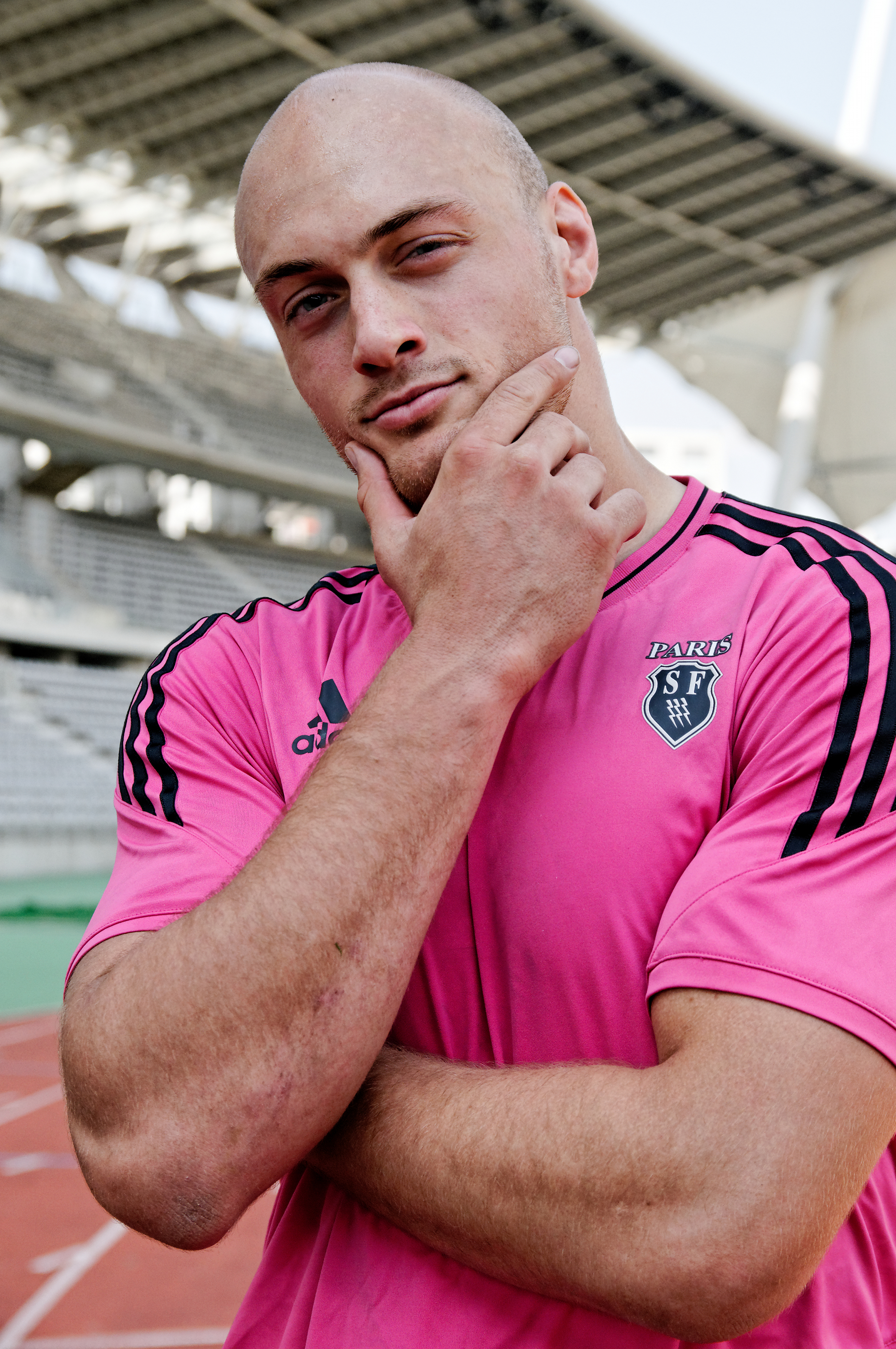
Scott LaValla Stade Français

LaValla made the USA U-19 team in 2007 that competed in the Freedom Cup and IRB Junior World Cup. He played at the U20 level in February 2008 against Canada. In 2008 he captained the U-20 side that played in Ireland.

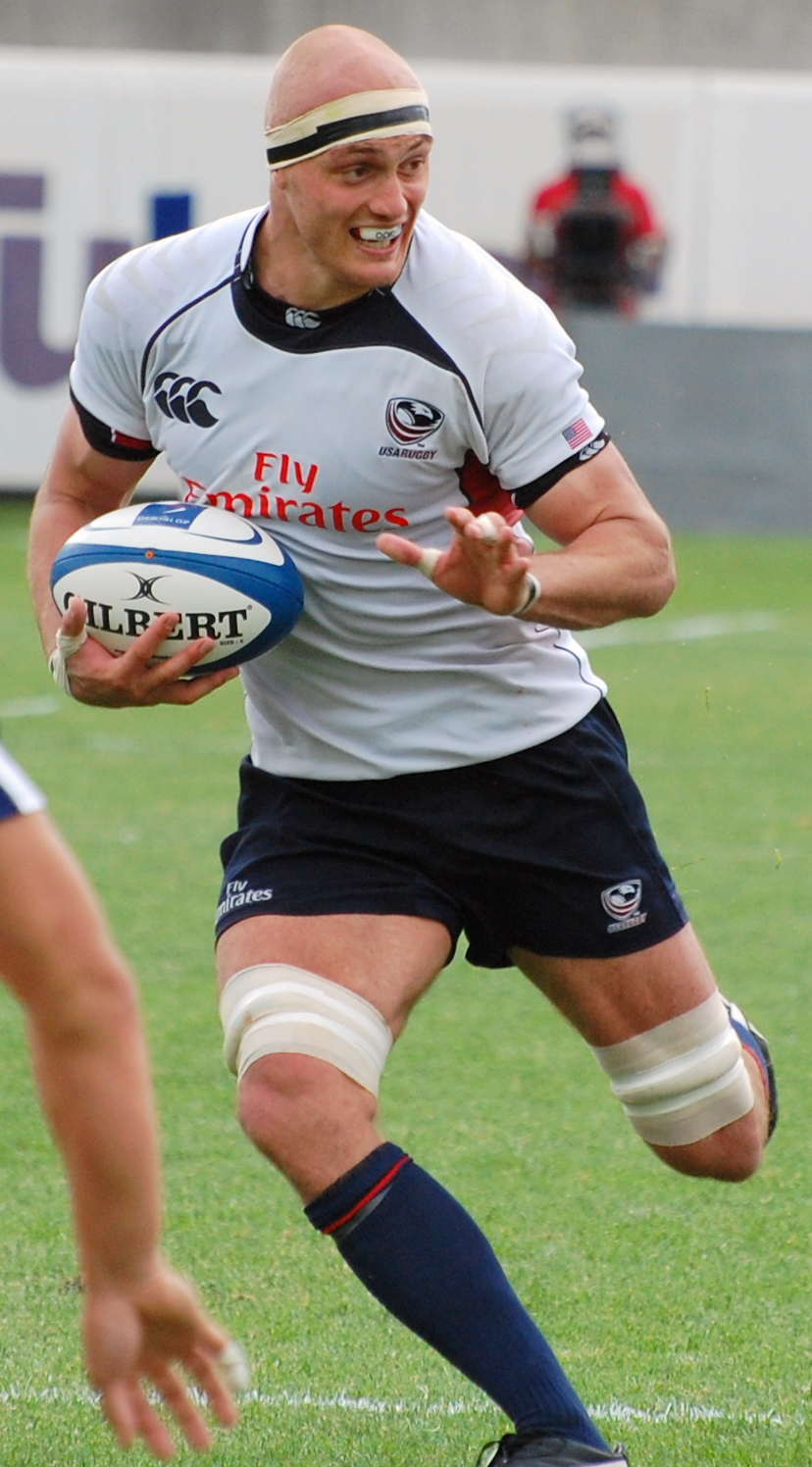
Scott Lavalla playing for the Eagles against Russia in the 2010 Churchill

LaValla's international test debut for the men's national team was the 2010 Churchill Cup, where he played three matches. He was selected to tour with the USA Eagles squad for the Autumn 2010 tour of Europe. LaValla was included the USA squad for the 2011 Rugby World Cup. On June 9, 2012, LaValla scored his first try for the Eagles in a 28-25 losing effort against Canada.

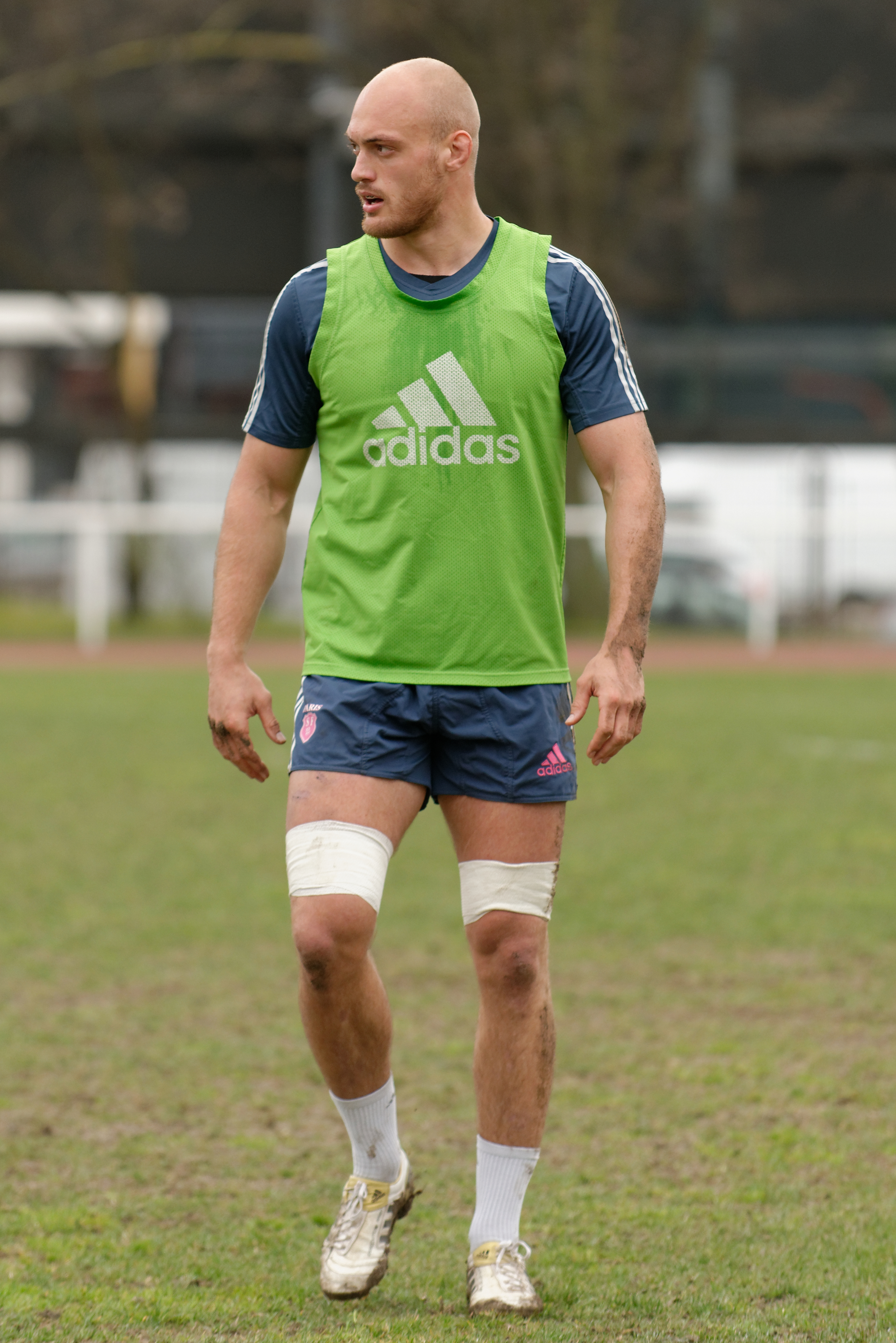
Scott LaValla training with Stade Francais in 2013

LaValla did not appear for the U.S. at the 2015 Rugby World Cup due to a broken elbow. He retired from rugby at the end of 2015.
