= Alastair McFarland =

US international rugby union player

- Born: 2 June 1989 (age 37) Sydney, NSW, Australia
- Height: 1.93 m (6 ft 4 in)
- Weight: 114 kg (251 lb; 17 st 13 lb)
- School: St. Ignatius College
- University: Australian Catholic University St. John's University

Rugby union career
- Position(s): Flanker, Number 8
- Current team: New York Athletic Club
Amateur team(s)
Years	Team	Apps	(Points)
2008–2011	Northern Suburbs Rugby Club		
2010–2011	Randwick Rugby Club		
2012	New York Athletic Club RFC		
International career
Years	Team	Apps	(Points)
2015–2017	United States	13	(0)
- Correct as of 1 January 2021

Alastair "Al" McFarland (born 2 June 1989) is a former Australian-American rugby union player who played for the USA Eagles. He played as a number 8 or flanker.

McFarland won USA Rugby Club Division I National Championships with New York Athletic Club in 2012 and 2015.

In July 2015, he earned his first National Team selection to the 2015 Pacific Nations Cup, earning his first cap against Japan in Sacramento. Following his international debut, he continued to make appearances with the Men's Eagles, suiting up as a starter for 6 of his 9 total matches including the 2015 Rugby World Cup.

In 2017, McFarland joined the team for the 2017 Americas Rugby Championship where he helped the United States clinch their first ever title victory in the tournament.
