= Viliami Tahituʻa =

Tongan rugby union player (born 1992)

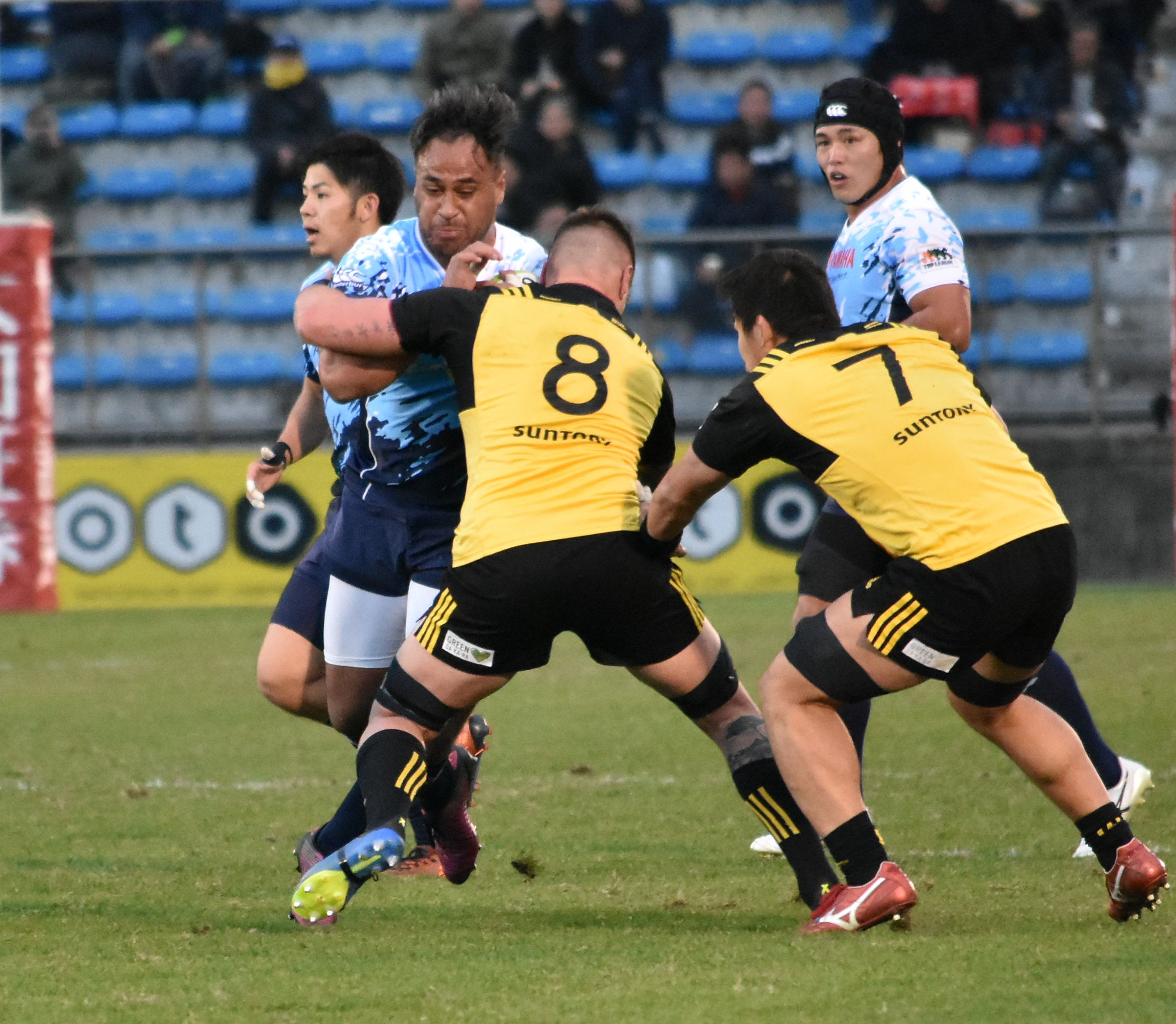
- Born: 10 September 1992 (age 34)
- Height: 1.80 m (5 ft 11 in)
- Weight: 105 kg (231 lb)

Rugby union career
- Position: Centre
Senior career
Years	Team	Apps	(Points)
2013–14	Northland	8	(0)
2016–2026	Yamaha Júbilo	105	(135)
- Correct as of 21 February 2021
International career
Years	Team	Apps	(Points)
2015–2017	Tonga	4	(0)
- Correct as of 16 June 2017

Viliami Tahitu'a (born 10 September 1992) is a rugby union centre who plays for Tonga. Tahitu'a made his debut for Tonga in July 2015 and was part of the Tonga squad at the 2015 Rugby World Cup.

He was selected again for the Tongan squad in 2017.

In July 2014 he was selected for Northland.
