= Maselino Paulino =

Samoan rugby player (born 1988)

- Born: 21 June 1988 (age 38) Samoa
- Height: 2.05 m (6 ft 9 in)
- Weight: 118 kg (18 st 8 lb; 260 lb)

Rugby union career
- Position(s): Lock, Flanker
Senior career
Years	Team	Apps	(Points)
2011-12	Hawke's Bay	7	(5)
2015–2016	Scarlets	16	(0)
2016–2017	Lyon	11	(0)
2017–2018	RC Narbonne	15	(10)
2018-	Stade Montois	32	(15)
- Correct as of 29 December 2019
International career
Years	Team	Apps	(Points)
2008–	Samoa	7	(0)
- Correct as of 6 April 2016

Maselino Paulino (born 21 June 1988) is a Samoan rugby union player who plays as a second-row or flanker.

He made his debut for the Samoa national rugby union team in September 2008, playing against New Zealand in New Plymouth. He has made 7 appearances for his country to date, spread over 8 calendar years. His last appearance came in the June 2015 international victory against Canada, but Paulino was not selected to be a part of Samoa's final squad for the 2015 Rugby World Cup. He stands at 205 cm in height, slightly under 6 ft 9 in.

Paulino joined the Scarlets in October 2015, originally signing on trial before signing a season-long contract. To date, Paulino has received 3 yellow cards in 15 appearances, and he was also suspended for 3 weeks for striking Courtney Lawes in the Rugby Challenge Cup match against Northampton Saints in January 2016. In March 2016, Lyon announced that they had signed Paulino for the 2016–17 season. On 14 February 2017, Paulino would leave Lyon to join Pro D2 club RC Narbonne from the 2017–18 season.
