= Sosefo Sakalia =

Tonga international rugby union player

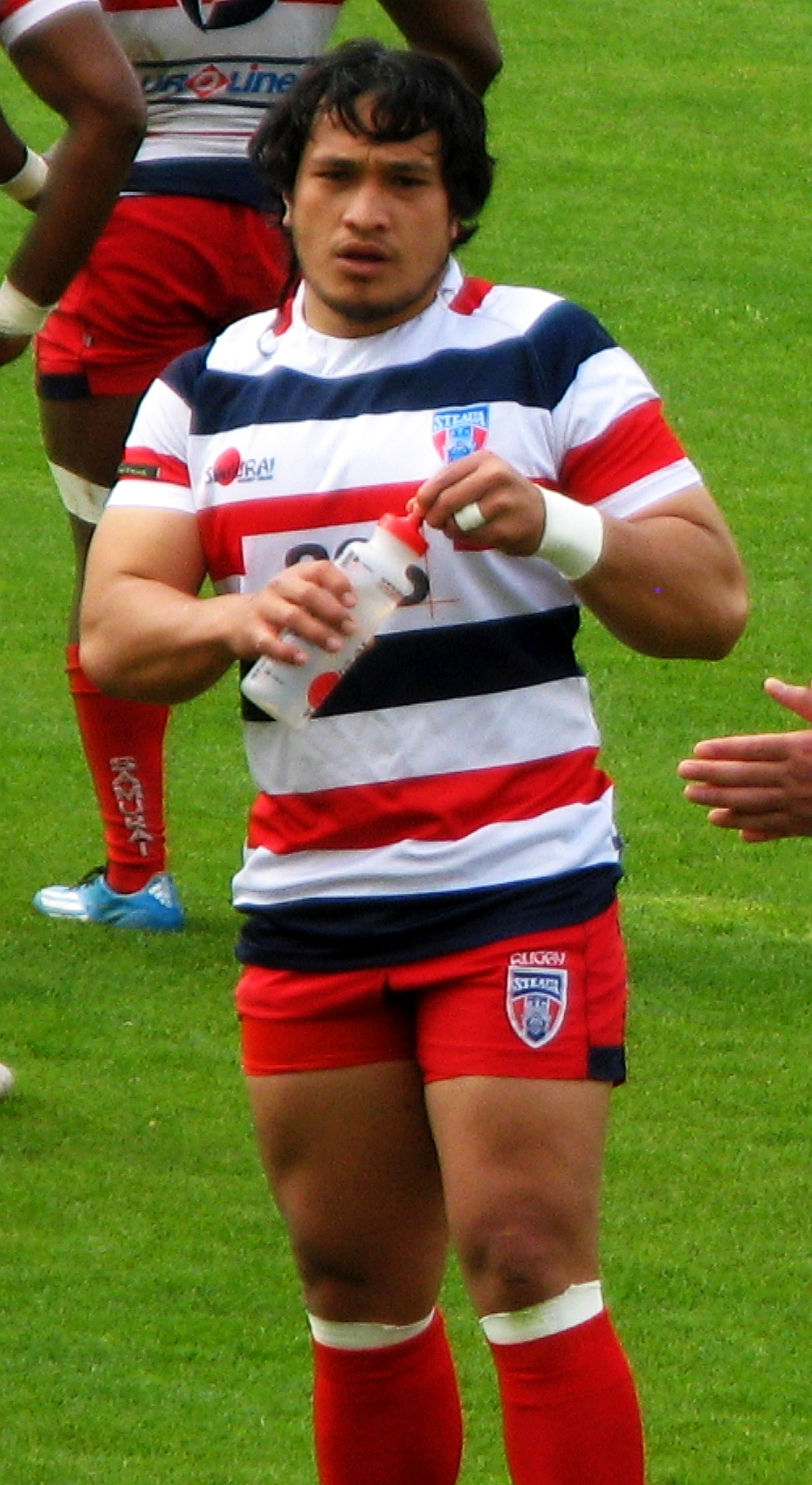
- Sakalia representing Steaua București during the Liga Națională de Rugby
- Born: 14 December 1991 (age 34) Nukuʻalofa, Tonga
- Height: 1.78 m (5 ft 10 in)
- Weight: 96 kg (212 lb; 15 st 2 lb)
- School: Apifo'ou College

Rugby union career
- Position: Hooker
- Current team: Kolomotu'a
Senior career
| Years | Team | Apps | (Points) |
| 2014 | Steaua București | 14 | (15) |
| 2015 | Olimpia București | 7 | (0) |
| 2016–2018 | Steaua București | 11 | (40) |
| 2019 | Asia Pacific Dragons | 1 | (0) |
- Correct as of 18 June 2023
International career
| Years | Team | Apps | (Points) |
| 2010–2011 | Tonga U20 | 8 | (0) |
| 2015– | Tonga | 14 | (15) |
- Correct as of 18 June 2023

Sosefo Sakalia (born 14 December 1991) is a Tongan professional rugby union player who plays as a hooker for Tongatapu club Kolomotu'a and the Tonga national team.

== Professional career ==
Sakalia made his international debut at the 2015 World Rugby Pacific Nations Cup in a match against the Canucks. Before rejoining Steaua București in 2016, Sakalia also played for Olimpia București during 2015.
