= Jake Grey =

Samoan rugby union player (1984–2021)

- Born: 17 February 1984
- Died: 19 December 2021 (aged 37) Moto'otua Hospital, Apia, Samoa
- Height: 1.8 m (5 ft 11 in)
- Weight: 125 kg (276 lb; 19 st 10 lb)

Rugby union career
- Position: Prop
International career
Years	Team	Apps	(Points)
2014–?	Samoa	5	(0)

Jake Jacob Grey (17 February 1984 – 19 December 2021) was a Samoan rugby union prop who played for SCOPA and the Samoa national rugby union team.

Grey made his debut for Samoa in 2014 in Samoa's 4 Test series and was part of the squad at the 2015 Rugby World Cup.

He spent some time in Ireland after arriving in 2006 and departed in 2012 with hopes of representing Samoa.

Grey died on 19 December 2021, at the age of 37, after suffering from cancer.
