= Liam Underwood =

Canada international rugby union player (born 1991)

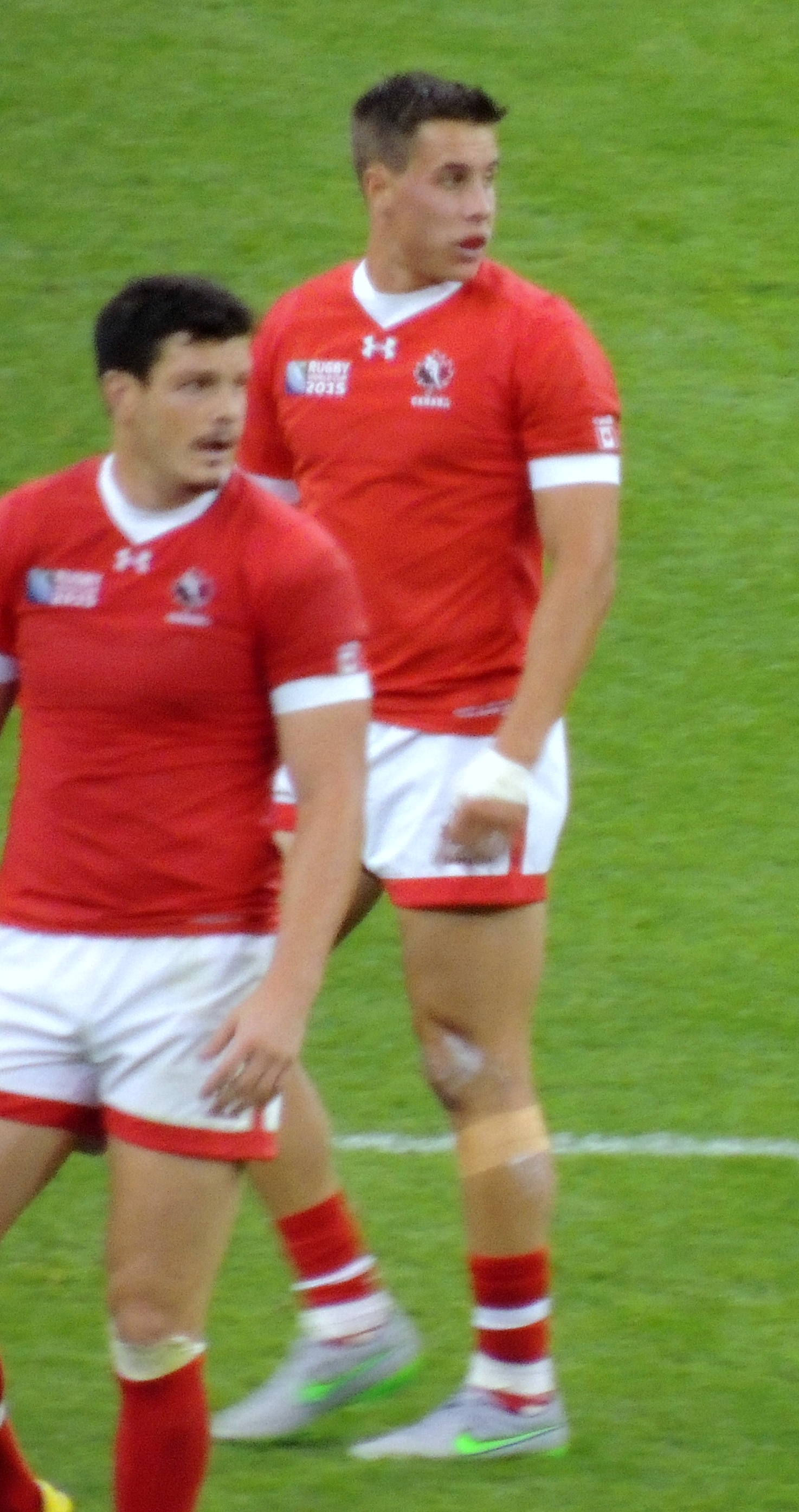
- Underwood playing for Canada in the 2015 Rugby World Cup
- Born: 3 June 1991 (age 35) Toronto, Ontario
- Height: 1.89 m (6 ft 2 in)
- Weight: 91 kg (201 lb)

Rugby union career
- Position: Fly half
International career
Years	Team	Apps	(Points)
2013–present	Canada	13	(17)

Liam Underwood (born 3 June 1991 in Toronto, Ontario) is a rugby union fly-half who plays for Ontario Blues and Canada. Underwood made his debut for Canada in 2013 and was part of the Canada squad at the 2015 Rugby World Cup.
