= Sosefo Maʻake =

Sosefo Ma'ake
- Born: September 15, 1991 (age 35) Tongatapu, Tonga
- Height: 1.79 m (5 ft 10 1/2 in)
- Weight: 97 kg (15 st 4 lb; 214 lb)

Rugby union career
- Position: Halfback
Senior career
Years	Team	Apps	(Points)
2015	Havelu Bulldogs		
International career
Years	Team	Apps	(Points)
2015	Tonga	1	(0)
- Correct as of 14 September 2015

Sosefo Ma'ake (born 15 September 1991, Tonga) is a rugby union footballer. He plays internationally for Tonga and competed at the 2015 Pacific Nations Cup. He plays as a Halfback. Ma'ake was named in Tonga's 2015 Rugby World Cup.
