= 2015 Rugby World Cup warm-up matches =

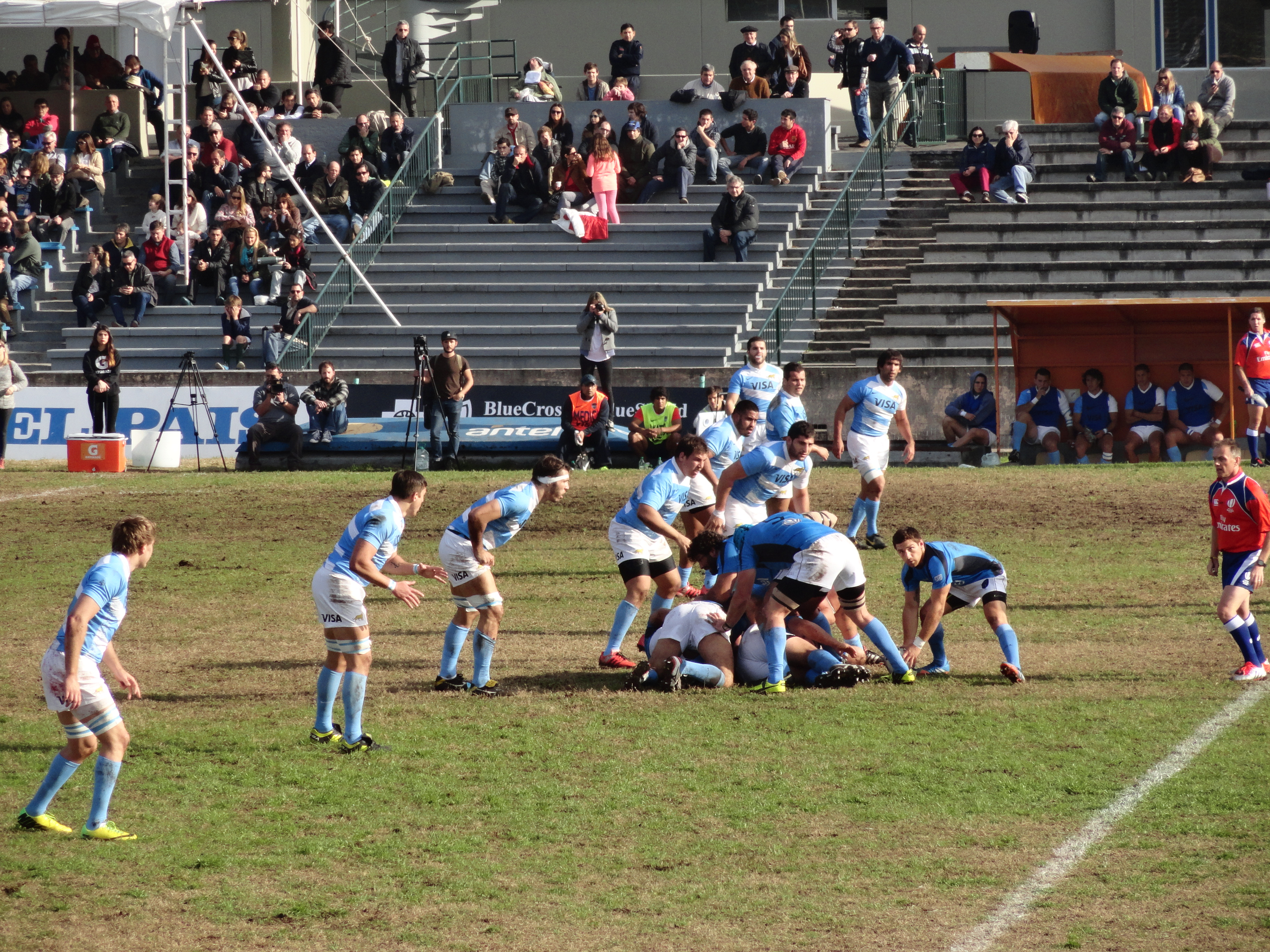
Uruguay Teros vs Argentina XV

The 2015 Rugby World Cup warm-up matches were a series of rugby union test matches that took place in August and September 2015, as the 20 competing teams prepared for the 2015 Rugby World Cup.

For most teams, their preparation kicked off in August after various training camps before the squad announcement deadline date of 31 August. Uruguay were the first to begin their warm-up campaign at the start of August, playing three tests: first against an Argentina XV, and then a two-test series against Japan, before playing an uncapped match against a Basque Selection team. Wales and reigning Six Nations champions Ireland followed suit a week later, with the first game of a home and away series, after which Wales played Italy, just days after they announced their final World Cup team. Hosts England played a home and away test series against France before they played Ireland in London. Both Ireland and France played Scotland at home, while Scotland played a home and away test series against the Italians.

With a reduced 2015 Rugby Championship, participants Argentina hosted South Africa, while reigning World Cup champions New Zealand hosted Australia for the second Bledisloe Cup match of 2015. En route to the World Cup, the Wallabies stopped off in the United States to play their national team for the first time on American soil since 1976. The United States also hosted English club side Harlequins, while they also faced Canada in Ottawa. Canada additionally hosted Pro12 champions Glasgow Warriors, before they faced Georgia and Fiji at a neutral venue in the United Kingdom, which also hosted Georgia's encounter with Japan. Glasgow's Scottish counterparts Edinburgh, faced Romania, who also took on Tonga for just their second time in their history.

Aside from Harlequins, other English clubs faced international opposition, when Newcastle Falcons faced Georgia, Leicester Tigers faced Argentina, Yorkshire Carnegie played Romania and Wasps hosted Samoa. Samoa were the first international rugby union team to play at the Olympic Stadium in London, when they faced the Barbarians, with most of that team haven played for a World XV side against Japan a week earlier.

== Fixtures ==
=== Week 1 ===
1 August 2015
15:30 UYT (UTC-03)

Uruguay	30–26	Argentina XV
Try: Bulanti 26' m Etcheverry 43' c Con: Ormaechea (1/2) 44'; Pen: Ormaechea (1/1) 8'; Berchesi (5/6) 11', 28', 34', 64', 75'	Report (In Spanish)	Try: Báez 14' m Orlando 37' c Panceyra Garrido 41' c Paulín 58' c Con: Novillo (2/3) 38', 42'; Miotti (1/1) 59'

Estadio Charrúa, Montevideo
Referee: Chris Pollock (New Zealand)

Team details

FB	15	Jerónimo Etcheverry (c)
RW	14	Francisco Bulanti
OC	13	Pedro Deal		(substituted off) 64'
IC	12	Andrés Vilaseca
LW	11	Rodrigo Silva
FH	10	Felipe Berchesi	(yellow card) 50'
SH	9	Agustín Ormaechea
N8	8	Alejandro Nieto
OF	7	Fernando Bascou		(substituted off) 55'
BF	6	Juan de Freitas		(substituted off) 64'
RL	5	Mathias Palomeque		(substituted off) 62'
LL	4	Franco Lamanna
TP	3	Mario Sagario		(substituted off) 64'
HK	2	Germán Kessler		(substituted off) 55'
LP	1	Juan Echeverría		(substituted off) 51'
Replacements:
PR	16	Oscar Durán		(substituted on) 64'
HK	17	Arturo Avalo		(substituted on) 55'
PR	18	Alejo Corral		(substituted on) 51'
LK	19	Ignacio Dotti		(substituted on) 62'
FL	20	Gabriel Puig		(substituted on) 64'
FL	21	Agustín Alonso		(substituted on) 55'
SH	22	Guillermo Lijtenstein
CE	23	Joaquín Prada		(substituted on) 24'
Coach:
(Uruguay) Pablo Lemoine

FB	15	Román Miralles
RW	14	Ramiro Moyano	(substituted off) 44'
OC	13	Matías Orlando (c)	(substituted off) 53'
IC	12	Joaquín Paz
LW	11	Axel Müller
FH	10	Juan León Novillo
SH	9	Gonzalo Bertranou	(substituted off) 70'
N8	8	Lisandro Ahualli de Chazal
OF	7	Gonzalo Paulín
BF	6	Rodrigo Báez
RL	5	Aníbal Panceyra Garrido
LL	4	Ignacio Larrague	(substituted off) 64'
TP	3	Guido Randisi	(substituted off) 58'
HK	2	Santiago Iglesias Valdez	(substituted off) 58'
LP	1	Roberto Tejerizo	(substituted off) 48'
Replacements:
HK	16	Tomas Baravalle	(substituted on) 58'
PR	17	Santiago García Botta	(substituted on) 48'
PR	18	Cristian Bartolini	(substituted on) 58'
LK	19	Ignacio Calas
FL	20	Vito Scaglione	(substituted on) 64'
SH	21	Patricio Baronio	(substituted on) 70'
FH	22	Domingo Miotti	(substituted on) 53'
CE	23	Tomás Granella	(substituted on) 44'
Coach:
(Argentina) Felipe Contepomi (Argentina) Ricardo Le Fort

Man of the Match:
Alejandro Nieto (Uruguay)

Touch judges:
Federico Anselmi (Argentina)
Joaquín Montes (Uruguay)

Notes:

- Uruguay awarded caps for this match.
- This was Uruguay's first ever victory over Argentina, despite it not being a full test match.

=== Week 2 ===
8 August 2015
14:30 BST (UTC+01)

Wales	21–35	Ireland
Try: Hibbard 36' c Tipuric 70' c Cuthbert 80' c Con: Hook (1/1) 37'; Anscombe (2/2) 71', 80+2'	Report	Try: Heaslip 8' m Cave 22' c Earls 29' c Zebo 47' m Jones 53' m Con: Jackson (2/5) 22', 30'; Pen: Jackson (2/2) 18', 33'

Millennium Stadium, Cardiff
Attendance: 74,000
Referee: Glen Jackson (New Zealand)

Team details

FB	15	Hallam Amos
RW	14	Alex Cuthbert
OC	13	Tyler Morgan
IC	12	Scott Williams (c)		(substituted off) 56'
LW	11	Eli Walker
FH	10	James Hook		(substituted off) 49'
SH	9	Mike Phillips		(substituted off) 49'
N8	8	Dan Baker		(substituted off) 40'
OF	7	Justin Tipuric
BF	6	Ross Moriarty	(yellow card) 45'
RL	5	Dominic Day
LL	4	Jake Ball		(substituted off) 57'
TP	3	Aaron Jarvis		(substituted off) 57'
HK	2	Richard Hibbard		(substituted off) 50'
LP	1	Nicky Smith		(substituted off) 50'
Replacements:
HK	16	Kristian Dacey		(substituted on) 50'
PR	17	Rob Evans		(substituted on) 50'
PR	18	Scott Andrews		(substituted on) 57'
FL	19	James King		(substituted on) 57'
N8	20	Taulupe Faletau		(substituted on) 40'
SH	21	Lloyd Williams		(substituted on) 49'
FH	22	Gareth Anscombe		(substituted on) 49'
FB	23	Matthew Morgan		(substituted on) 56'
Coach:
(New Zealand) Warren Gatland

FB	15	Felix Jones
RW	14	Andrew Trimble		(substituted off) 34'
OC	13	Keith Earls		(substituted off) 67'
IC	12	Darren Cave
LW	11	Fergus McFadden
FH	10	Paddy Jackson
SH	9	Eoin Reddan		(substituted off) 67'
N8	8	Jamie Heaslip (c)		(substituted off) 54'
OF	7	Tommy O'Donnell		(substituted off) 75'
BF	6	Jordi Murphy
RL	5	Donnacha Ryan		(substituted off) 49'
LL	4	Iain Henderson
TP	3	Mike Ross		(substituted off) 57'
HK	2	Richardt Strauss		(substituted off) 19'	(substituted on) 25'	(substituted off) 64'
LP	1	Jack McGrath		(substituted off) 51'
Replacements:
HK	16	Rory Best		(substituted on) 19'	(substituted off) 25'	(substituted on) 64'
PR	17	Dave Kilcoyne		(substituted on) 51'
PR	18	Michael Bent		(substituted on) 57'
LK	19	Dan Tuohy		(substituted on) 49'
FL	20	Chris Henry	(yellow card) 59'	(substituted on) 54'
SH	21	Kieran Marmion		(substituted on) 67'
FH	22	Ian Madigan		(substituted on) 67'
WG	23	Simon Zebo		(substituted on) 34'
Coach:
(New Zealand) Joe Schmidt

Man of the Match:
Keith Earls (Ireland)

Touch judges:
Pascal Gauzère (France)
Mathieu Raynal (France)
Television match official:
Graham Hughes (England)

Notes:

- Gareth Anscombe, Kristian Dacey, Dominic Day, Ross Moriarty Tyler Morgan and Eli Walker (all Wales) made their international debuts.
- Mike Ross (Ireland) earned his 50th test cap.
- No replacement was issued when Tommy O'Donnell was taken off injured in the 75th minute.

=== Week 3 ===
14 August 2015
17:30 BST (UTC+01)

Yorkshire Carnegie (England)	10–10	Romania
Try: Fitzpatrick 69' c Con: Leonard (1/1) 71'; Pen: Leonard (1/1) 27'	Report	Try: Morrison 36' c Con: Vlaicu (1/1) 37'; Pen: Vlaicu (1/1) 19'

Headingley, Leeds
Referee: Ian Tempest (England)

15 August 2015
19:35 NZST (UTC+12)

New Zealand	41–13	Australia
Try: Coles 21' c Penalty try 47' c Nonu (2) 50' c, 64' c C. Smith 53' c Con: Carter (5/5) 23', 47', 51', 54', 66'; Pen: Carter (2/3) 17', 28'	Report	Try: Folau 76' c Con: White (1/1) 77'; Pen: Cooper (2/2) 7', 31'

Eden Park, Auckland
Attendance: 48,457
Referee: Nigel Owens (Wales)

Team details

FB	15	Ben Smith
RW	14	Nehe Milner-Skudder	(substituted off) 51'
OC	13	Conrad Smith	(substituted off) 67'
IC	12	Ma'a Nonu
LW	11	Julian Savea
FH	10	Dan Carter
SH	9	Aaron Smith	(substituted off) 65'
N8	8	Kieran Read
OF	7	Richie McCaw (c)	(substituted off) 67'
BF	6	Victor Vito	(substituted off) 63'
RL	5	Sam Whitelock
LL	4	Brodie Retallick
TP	3	Owen Franks	(substituted off) 62'
HK	2	Dane Coles	(substituted off) 65'
LP	1	Tony Woodcock	(substituted off) 51'
Replacements:
HK	16	Keven Mealamu	(substituted on) 65'
PR	17	Wyatt Crockett	(substituted on) 51'
PR	18	Nepo Laulala	(substituted on) 62'
FL	19	Jerome Kaino	(substituted on) 67'
FL	20	Sam Cane	(substituted on) 63'
SH	21	TJ Perenara	(substituted on) 65'
FH	22	Colin Slade	(substituted on) 51'
CE	23	Malakai Fekitoa	(substituted on) 67'
Coach:
(New Zealand) Steve Hansen

FB	15	Israel Folau
RW	14	Henry Speight		(substituted off) 37'	(substituted on) 40'	(substituted off) 48'
OC	13	Tevita Kuridrani
IC	12	Matt To'omua
LW	11	Adam Ashley-Cooper
FH	10	Quade Cooper	(yellow card) 48'			(substituted off) 58'
SH	9	Nic White
N8	8	Wycliff Palu				(substituted off) 40'
OF	7	Michael Hooper		(substituted off) 27'	(substituted on) 31'
BF	6	Scott Fardy
RL	5	James Horwill		(substituted off) 62'
LL	4	Will Skelton		(substituted off) 40'
TP	3	Sekope Kepu		(substituted off) 51'	(substituted on) 62'	(substituted off) 66'
HK	2	Stephen Moore (c)		(substituted off) 66'
LP	1	Scott Sio		(substituted off) 51'
Replacements:
HK	16	Tatafu Polota-Nau		(substituted on) 66'
PR	17	James Slipper		(substituted on) 51'
PR	18	Greg Holmes		(substituted on) 51'	(substituted off) 62'	(substituted on) 66'
LK	19	Dean Mumm		(substituted on) 40'
LK	20	Kane Douglas		(substituted on) 62'
FL	21	David Pocock		(substituted on) 27'	(substituted off) 31'	(substituted on) 40'
CE	22	Matt Giteau				(substituted on) 48'
CE	23	Kurtley Beale		(substituted on) 37'	(substituted off) 40'	(substituted on) 58'
Coach:
(Australia) Michael Cheika

Man of the Match:
Ma'a Nonu (New Zealand)

Touch judges:
Wayne Barnes (England)
Federico Anselmi (Argentina)
Television match official:
Shaun Veldsman (South Africa)

Notes:

- Richie McCaw surpassed Ireland's Brian O'Driscoll world record as the most capped rugby player, with 142 caps.
- David Pocock (Australia) earned his 50th test cap.
- New Zealand retained the Bledisloe Cup.

15 August 2015
18:00 JST (UTC+09)

Japan	20–45	World XV
Try: Hesketh 13' c Penalty try 66' c Con: Goromaru (1/1) 15'; Tatekawa (1/1) 67'; Pen: Goromaru (2/3) 48', 57'	Report	Try: Naiyaravoro (3) 20' c, 69' c, 78' m Ellis (2) 53' c, 59' c Con: Barnes (3/3) 21', 53', 61'; Harris (1/2) 70'; Pen: Barnes (4/5) 6', 12', 32', 39'

Chichibunomiya Rugby Stadium, Tokyo
Attendance: 12,740
Referee: Andrew Lees (Australia)

Team details

FB	15	Ayumu Goromaru	(substituted off) 62'
RW	14	Karne Hesketh
OC	13	Kotaro Matsushima
IC	12	Male Sa'u
LW	11	Kenki Fukuoka	(substituted off) 51'
FH	10	Harumichi Tatekawa
SH	9	Fumiaki Tanaka	(substituted off) 65'
N8	8	Koliniasi Holani
OF	7	Michael Leitch (c)
BF	6	Hendrik Tui
RL	5	Justin Ives	(substituted off) 36'
LL	4	Luke Thompson
TP	3	Kensuke Hatakeyama	(substituted off) 51'
HK	2	Shota Horie	(substituted off) 68'
LP	1	Masataka Mikami	51' to 57'
Replacements:
PR	16	Hisateru Hirashima	(substituted on) 51'	(substituted off) 57'
HK	17	Takeshi Kizu	(substituted on) 68'
PR	18	Hiroshi Yamashita	(substituted on) 51'
LK	19	Kazuhiko Usami	(substituted on) 36'	(substituted off) 70'
N8	20	Hayden Hopgood		(substituted on) 70'
SH	21	Atsushi Hiwasa	(substituted on) 65'
CE	22	Craig Wing	(substituted on) 51'
WG	23	Yoshikazu Fujita	(substituted on) 62'
Coach:
(Australia) Eddie Jones

FB	15	(Australia) James O'Connor		(substituted off) 58'
RW	14	(Fiji) Taqele Naiyaravoro
OC	13	(Australia) Ben Tapuai
IC	12	(Australia) Christian Lealiifano
LW	11	(Australia) Nick Cummins
FH	10	(Australia) Berrick Barnes		(substituted off) 67'
SH	9	(New Zealand) Andrew Ellis
N8	8	(South Africa) Pierre Spies
OF	7	(Australia) Liam Gill
BF	6	(New Zealand) Adam Thomson		(substituted off) 53'
RL	5	(New Zealand) Ali Williams	(yellow card) 66'
LL	4	(South Africa) Bakkies Botha (c)		(substituted off) 53'
TP	3	(New Zealand) Carl Hayman		(substituted off) 58'
HK	2	(New Zealand) Andrew Hore		(substituted off) 53'
LP	1	(Australia) Benn Robinson		(substituted off) 58'
Replacements:
HK	16	(Australia) Tolu Latu		(substituted on) 53'
PR	17	(Australia) Ben Alexander		(substituted on) 58'
PR	18	(South Africa) Petrus du Plessis		(substituted on) 58'
LK	19	(Australia) Luke Jones		(substituted on) 53'
FL	20	(Australia) Sean McMahon		(substituted on) 53'
SH	21	(Australia) Luke Burgess		(substituted on) 67'
FH	22	(Australia) Mike Harris		(substituted on) 58'
WG	23	(Australia) Dom Shipperley
Coach:
(New Zealand) Robbie Deans

Touch judges:
Hirabayashi Taizo (Japan)
Shimizu Rui (Japan)

15 August 2015
17:00 WEST (UTC+01)

Ireland	28–22	Scotland
Try: Henry 14' c Cronin 53' c Zebo 59' c Fitzgerald 68' c Con: Madigan (4/4) 15', 55', 60', 70'	Report	Try: Cowan 30' c Pyrgos 43' m Horne 63' c Con: Horne (1/2) 32'; Jackson (1/1) 65'; Pen: Horne (1/2) 59'

Aviva Stadium, Dublin
Attendance: 31,780
Referee: Pascal Gaüzère (France)

Team details

FB	15	Simon Zebo	(substituted off) 77'
RW	14	Tommy Bowe	(substituted off) 59'
OC	13	Jared Payne
IC	12	Gordon D'Arcy
LW	11	Luke Fitzgerald
FH	10	Ian Madigan
SH	9	Isaac Boss	(substituted off) 65'
N8	8	Seán O'Brien (c)
OF	7	Chris Henry
BF	6	Jack Conan	(substituted off) 65'
RL	5	Dan Tuohy
LL	4	Devin Toner	(substituted off) 55'
TP	3	Mike Ross	(substituted off) 51'
HK	2	Seán Cronin	(substituted off) 59'
LP	1	Dave Kilcoyne	(substituted off) 59'
Replacements:
HK	16	Richardt Strauss	(substituted on) 59'
PR	17	Michael Bent	(substituted on) 59'
PR	18	Nathan White	(substituted on) 51'
LK	19	Paul O'Connell	(substituted on) 55'
FL	20	Jordi Murphy	(substituted on) 65'
SH	21	Eoin Reddan	(substituted on) 65'
FH	22	Paddy Jackson	(substituted on) 77'
WG	23	David Kearney	(substituted on) 59'
Coach:
(New Zealand) Joe Schmidt

FB	15	Ruaridh Jackson
RW	14	Sean Lamont
OC	13	Richie Vernon	(substituted off) 59'
IC	12	Peter Horne
LW	11	Tim Visser
FH	10	Greig Tonks
SH	9	Henry Pyrgos (c)	(substituted off) 65'
N8	8	David Denton
OF	7	Hugh Blake
BF	6	Blair Cowan	(substituted off) 57'
RL	5	Grant Gilchrist
LL	4	Jim Hamilton	(substituted off) 55'
TP	3	Jon Welsh	(substituted off) 46'
HK	2	Fraser Brown	(substituted off) 51'
LP	1	Ryan Grant	(substituted off) 44'
Replacements:
HK	16	Ross Ford	(substituted on) 51'
PR	17	Gordon Reid	(substituted on) 44'
PR	18	Michael Cusack	(substituted on) 46'
LK	19	Rob Harley	(substituted on) 55'
FL	20	John Barclay	(substituted on) 57'
SH	21	Sam Hidalgo-Clyne	(substituted on) 65'
FH	22	Duncan Weir
CE	23	Matt Scott	(substituted on) 59'
Coach:
(New Zealand) Vern Cotter

Man of the Match:
Simon Zebo (Ireland)

Touch judges:
Jérôme Garcès (France)
Marius Mitrea (Italy)
Television match official:
Graham Hughes (England)

Notes:

- Jack Conan, Nathan White (both Ireland), Hugh Blake and Michael Cusack (both Scotland) made their international debuts.

15 August 2015
20:00 BST (UTC+01)

England	19–14	France
Try: Watson (2) 10' c, 17' m May 45' c Con: Farrell (2/3) 12', 46'	Report	Try: Ouedraogo 60' m Con: Kockott (0/1); Pen: Parra (3/3) 6', 25', 32'

Twickenham, London
Attendance: 63,113
Referee: John Lacey (Ireland)

Team details

FB	15	Alex Goode		(substituted off) 49'
RW	14	Anthony Watson
OC	13	Henry Slade		(substituted off) 65'
IC	12	Sam Burgess	(yellow card) 35'
LW	11	Jonny May
FH	10	Owen Farrell
SH	9	Richard Wigglesworth		(substituted off) 49'
N8	8	Ben Morgan		(substituted off) 40'
OF	7	Calum Clark	(yellow card) 53'
BF	6	Tom Wood (c)
RL	5	Geoff Parling		(substituted off) 55'
LL	4	George Kruis
TP	3	Kieran Brookes		(substituted off) 55'
HK	2	Rob Webber		(substituted off) 55'
LP	1	Mako Vunipola		(substituted off) 62'
Replacements:
HK	16	Luke Cowan-Dickie		(substituted on) 55'
PR	17	Alex Corbisiero		(substituted on) 62'
PR	18	David Wilson		(substituted on) 55'
LK	19	Dave Attwood		(substituted on) 55'
FL	20	James Haskell		(substituted on) 40'
SH	21	Danny Care		(substituted on) 49'
FH	22	Danny Cipriani		(substituted on) 49'
CE	23	Billy Twelvetrees		(substituted on) 65'
Coach:
(England) Stuart Lancaster

FB	15	Scott Spedding
RW	14	Sofiane Guitoune
OC	13	Rémi Lamerat
IC	12	Alexandre Dumoulin			(substituted off) 65'
LW	11	Brice Dulin	16' to 25'
FH	10	François Trinh-Duc	(substituted off) 60'
SH	9	Morgan Parra	(substituted off) 60'
N8	8	Louis Picamoles
OF	7	Fulgence Ouedraogo
BF	6	Yannick Nyanga	(substituted off) 55'
RL	5	Yoann Maestri	(substituted off) 65'
LL	4	Alexandre Flanquart
TP	3	Nicolas Mas	(substituted off) 50'
HK	2	Dimitri Szarzewski (c)	(substituted off) 52'
LP	1	Vincent Debaty	(substituted off) 52'
Replacements:
HK	16	Guilhem Guirado	(substituted on) 52'
PR	17	Xavier Chiocci	(substituted on) 52'
PR	18	Uini Atonio	(substituted on) 50'
LK	19	Sébastien Vahaamahina	(substituted on) 65'
N8	20	Loann Goujon	(substituted on) 55'
SH	21	Rory Kockott	(substituted on) 60'
FH	22	Rémi Talès	(substituted on) 60'
CE	23	Gaël Fickou	(substituted on) 16'	(substituted off) 25'	(substituted on) 65'
Coach:
(France) Philippe Saint-André

Man of the Match:
Anthony Watson (England)

Touch judges:
George Clancy (Ireland)
Leighton Hodges (Wales)
Television match official:
Simon McDowell (Ireland)

Notes:

- Sam Burgess, Calum Clark, Luke Cowan-Dickie and Henry Slade (England) made their international debuts.
- François Trinh-Duc (France) earned his 50th test cap.
- This was the 100th match contested between England and France.

15 August 2015
16:40 ART (UTC-03)

Argentina	12–26	South Africa
Pen: Sánchez (4/4) 14', 33', 38', 51'	Report	Try: Habana 26' c Mvovo 29' c Con: Lambie (2/2) 27', 31'; Pen: Lambie (3/3) 6', 17', 55'; Drop: Lambie (1/1) 42'

Estadio José Amalfitani, Buenos Aires
Referee: Glen Jackson (New Zealand)

Team details

FB	15	Joaquín Tuculet		(substituted off) 58'
RW	14	Santiago Cordero
OC	13	Matías Moroni		(substituted off) 74'
IC	12	Juan Pablo Socino
LW	11	Juan Imhoff
FH	10	Nicolás Sánchez
SH	9	Martín Landajo		(substituted off) 58'
N8	8	Juan Manuel Leguizamón		(substituted off) 51'
OF	7	Juan Martín Fernández Lobbe
BF	6	Tomás Lezana
RL	5	Tomás Lavanini	(yellow card) 62'
LL	4	Benjamín Macome		(substituted off) 51'
TP	3	Nahuel Tetaz Chaparro		(substituted off) 52'
HK	2	Agustín Creevy (c)		(substituted off) 40'
LP	1	Lucas Noguera Paz		(substituted off) 73'
Replacements:
HK	16	Julián Montoya		(substituted on) 40'
PR	17	Santiago García Botta		(substituted on) 73'
PR	18	Juan Pablo Orlandi		(substituted on) 52'
LK	19	Matías Alemanno		(substituted on) 51'
FL	20	Pablo Matera		(substituted on) 51'
SH	21	Tomás Cubelli		(substituted on) 58'
FH	22	Santiago González Iglesias		(substituted on) 74'
FB	23	Lucas González Amorosino		(substituted on) 58'
Coach:
(Argentina) Daniel Hourcade

FB	15	Zane Kirchner	(substituted off) 74'
RW	14	Lwazi Mvovo
OC	13	Jesse Kriel
IC	12	Damian de Allende	(substituted off) 63'
LW	11	Bryan Habana
FH	10	Pat Lambie
SH	9	Ruan Pienaar	(substituted off) 75'
N8	8	Schalk Burger
OF	7	Willem Alberts	(substituted off) 63'
BF	6	Heinrich Brüssow
RL	5	Victor Matfield (c)	(substituted off) 55'
LL	4	Eben Etzebeth
TP	3	Marcel van der Merwe	(substituted off) 48'
HK	2	Adriaan Strauss	(substituted off) 40'
LP	1	Trevor Nyakane	(substituted off) 47'
Replacements:
HK	16	Schalk Brits	(substituted on) 40'
PR	17	Tendai Mtawarira	(substituted on) 47'
PR	18	Frans Malherbe	(substituted on) 48'
LK	19	Flip van der Merwe	(substituted on) 55'
LK	20	Pieter-Steph du Toit	(substituted on) 63'
SH	21	Cobus Reinach	(substituted on) 75'
FH	22	Handré Pollard	(substituted on) 74'
CE	23	Jan Serfontein	(substituted on) 63'
Coach:
(South Africa) Heyneke Meyer

Touch judges:
Romain Poite (France)
Mike Fraser (New Zealand)
Television match official:
George Ayoub (Australia)

Notes:

- Santiago García Botta (Argentina) made his international debut.

=== Week 4 ===
21 August 2015
18:30 BST (UTC+01)

Edinburgh (Scotland)	31–16	Romania
Try: Grant (3) 20' m, 38' m, 78' c Du Preez 23' c Te Rure 62' c Con: Fowles (1/3) 24'; Te Rure (2/2) 64', 78'	Report	Try: Apostol 55' c Con: Dumbravă (1/1) 56'; Pen: Vlaicu (2/3) 15', 34'; Dumbravă (1/1) 61'

The Greenyards, Melrose
Attendance: 1,300
Referee: Greg Garner (England)

22 August 2015
18:00 JST (UTC+09)

Japan	30–8	Uruguay
Try: Tui (2) 10' c, 65' c Horie 32' c Con: Goromaru (3/3) 11', 33', 66'; Pen: Goromaru (3/3) 20', 43', 52'	Report	Try: Etcheverry 38' m Pen: Berchesi (1/1) 15'

Level-5 Stadium, Fukuoka
Attendance: 10,238
Referee: Jérôme Garcès (France)

Team details

FB	15	Ayumu Goromaru
RW	14	Karne Hesketh
OC	13	Male Sa'u
IC	12	Yu Tamura	(substituted off) 62'
LW	11	Keisuke Uchida	(substituted off) 50'
FH	10	Harumichi Tatekawa
SH	9	Atsushi Hiwasa	(substituted off) 52'
N8	8	Hendrik Tui
OF	7	Hayden Hopgood	(substituted off) 54'
BF	6	Michael Leitch (c)
RL	5	Shoji Ito
LL	4	Hitoshi Ono	(substituted off) 57'
TP	3	Hiroshi Yamashita	(substituted off) 54'
HK	2	Shota Horie	(substituted off) 62'
LP	1	Masataka Mikami	(substituted off) 68'
Replacements:
PR	16	Takayuki Watanabe	(substituted on) 68'
HK	17	Hiroki Yuhara	(substituted on) 62'
PR	18	Shinnosuke Kakinaga	(substituted on) 54'
LK	19	Luke Thompson	(substituted on) 57'
FL	20	Tsuyoshi Murata	(substituted on) 54'
SH	21	Fumiaki Tanaka	(substituted on) 52'
WG	22	Toshiaki Hirose	(substituted on) 62'
WG	23	Yoshikazu Fujita	(substituted on) 50'
Coach:
(Australia) Eddie Jones

FB	15	Gastón Mieres
RW	14	Santiago Gibernau
OC	13	Joaquín Prada
IC	12	Andrés Vilaseca
LW	11	Jerónimo Etcheverry	(substituted off) 64'
FH	10	Felipe Berchesi
SH	9	Agustín Ormaechea	(substituted off) 70'
N8	8	Alejandro Nieto	(substituted off) 57'
OF	7	Diego Magno	(substituted off) 64'
BF	6	Juan Manuel Gaminara
RL	5	Jorge Zerbino	(substituted off) 52'
LL	4	Santiago Vilaseca (c)
TP	3	Mario Sagario	(substituted off) 62'
HK	2	Nicolás Klappenbach	(substituted off) 18'
LP	1	Alejo Corral	(substituted off) 68'
Replacements:
HK	16	Germán Kessler	(substituted on) 62'
PR	17	Oscar Durán	(substituted on) 68'
PR	18	Carlos Arboleya	(substituted on) 18'
LK	19	Franco Lamanna	(substituted on) 52'
FL	20	Matías Beer	(substituted on) 64'
FL	21	Juan de Freitas	(substituted on) 57'
SH	22	Alejo Durán	(substituted on) 70'
WG	23	Leandro Leivas	(substituted on) 64'
Coach:
(Uruguay) Pablo Lemoine

Touch judges:
George Clancy (Ireland)
Leighton Hodges (Wales)

Notes:

- This was Japan's first ever win over Uruguay.

22 August 2015
20:00 CEST (UTC+02)

Italy	12–16	Scotland
Pen: Garcia (1/2) 17'; Allan (3/3) 24', 40', 61'	Report	Try: Pyrgos 73'; Con: Weir (1/1) 74'; Pen: Weir (3/4) 3', 12', 19'

Stadio Olimpico di Torino, Turin
Attendance: 10,800
Referee: JP Doyle (England)

Team details

FB	15	Andrea Masi
RW	14	Leonardo Sarto
OC	13	Tommaso Benvenuti	(substituted off) 66'
IC	12	Gonzalo Garcia	(substituted off) 75'
LW	11	Giovanbattista Venditti
FH	10	Tommaso Allan
SH	9	Guglielmo Palazzani	(substituted off) 75'
N8	8	Samuela Vunisa
OF	7	Alessandro Zanni
BF	6	Francesco Minto	(substituted off) 60'
RL	5	Valerio Bernabò	(substituted off) 51'
LL	4	Quintin Geldenhuys (c)
TP	3	Lorenzo Cittadini	(substituted off) 49'
HK	2	Davide Giazzon	(substituted off) 49'
LP	1	Matías Agüero	(substituted off) 49'
Replacements:
HK	16	Leonardo Ghiraldini	(substituted on) 49'
PR	17	Michele Rizzo	(substituted on) 49'
PR	18	Martin Castrogiovanni	(substituted on) 49'
LK	19	Marco Bortolami	(substituted on) 51'
FL	20	Mauro Bergamasco	(substituted on) 60'
SH	21	Marcello Violi	(substituted on) 75'
FH	22	Carlo Canna	(substituted on) 75'
FB	23	Luke McLean	(substituted on) 66'
Coach:
(France) Jacques Brunel

FB	15	Greig Tonks
RW	14	Sean Lamont
OC	13	Richie Vernon	(substituted off) 68'
IC	12	Matt Scott
LW	11	Rory Hughes	(substituted off) 62'
FH	10	Duncan Weir
SH	9	Sam Hidalgo-Clyne	(substituted off) 61'
N8	8	Adam Ashe
OF	7	John Hardie	(substituted off) 55'
BF	6	Alasdair Strokosch (c)
RL	5	Jim Hamilton
LL	4	Richie Gray
TP	3	Michael Cusack	(substituted off) 49'
HK	2	Stuart McInally	(substituted off) 51'
LP	1	Gordon Reid	(substituted off) 43'
Replacements:
HK	16	Ross Ford	(substituted on) 51'
PR	17	Alasdair Dickinson	(substituted on) 43'
PR	18	WP Nel	(substituted on) 46'
HK	19	Kevin Bryce
FL	20	Hamish Watson	(substituted on) 55'
SH	21	Henry Pyrgos	(substituted on) 61'
CE	22	Peter Horne	(substituted on) 68'
WG	23	Damien Hoyland	(substituted on) 62'
Coach:
(New Zealand) Vern Cotter

Man of the Match:
Samuela Vunisa (Italy)

Touch judges:
Nigel Owens (Wales)
Luke Pearce (England)
Television match official:
Graham Hughes (England)

Notes:

- Carlo Canna, Marcello Violi (both Italy), John Hardie, Damien Hoyland, Rory Hughes Stuart McInally and WP Nel (all Scotland) made their international debuts; Nel was the first Scottish Rugby Union project player to be capped.
- Grant Gilchrist was due to captain Scotland, but pulled out of the game prior to kick off due to illness. Jim Hamilton took his place in the starting XV, with hooker Kevin Bryce filling the vacated bench place.
- This Scottish win ended their six-match losing streak.

22 August 2015
21:00 CEST (UTC+02)

France	25–20	England
Try: Huget 45' c Con: Michalak (1/1) 46'; Pen: Spedding (1/1) 3'; Michalak (5/6) 10', 16', 25', 33', 65'	Report	Try: Cipriani 71' c Joseph 77' c Con: Ford (2/2) 72', 78'; Pen: Ford (2/3) 27', 39'

Stade de France, Saint-Denis
Attendance: 65,000
Referee: Jaco Peyper (South Africa)

Team details

FB	15	Scott Spedding
RW	14	Yoann Huget
OC	13	Mathieu Bastareaud	(substituted off) 67'
IC	12	Wesley Fofana
LW	11	Noa Nakaitaci
FH	10	Frédéric Michalak	(substituted off) 69'
SH	9	Sébastien Tillous-Borde	(substituted off) 70'
N8	8	Louis Picamoles	(substituted off) 56'
OF	7	Bernard Le Roux
BF	6	Damien Chouly
RL	5	Yoann Maestri
LL	4	Pascal Papé (c)	(substituted off) 67'
TP	3	Rabah Slimani	(substituted off) 63'
HK	2	Guilhem Guirado	(substituted off) 56'
LP	1	Eddy Ben Arous	(substituted off) 56'
Replacements:
HK	16	Benjamin Kayser	(substituted on) 56'
PR	17	Vincent Debaty	(substituted on) 56'
PR	18	Uini Atonio	(substituted on) 63'
LK	19	Alexandre Flanquart	(substituted on) 67'
FL	20	Yannick Nyanga	(substituted on) 56'
SH	21	Rory Kockott	(substituted on) 70'
FH	22	Rémi Talès	(substituted on) 69'
CE	23	Gaël Fickou	(substituted on) 67'
Coach:
(France) Philippe Saint-André

FB	15	Mike Brown
RW	14	Jack Nowell
OC	13	Jonathan Joseph
IC	12	Luther Burrell	(substituted off) 63'
LW	11	Jonny May	(substituted off) 63'
FH	10	George Ford
SH	9	Ben Youngs	(substituted off) 48'
N8	8	Billy Vunipola
OF	7	Chris Robshaw (c)
BF	6	James Haskell	(substituted off) 53'
RL	5	Courtney Lawes
LL	4	Joe Launchbury	(substituted off) 53'
TP	3	Dan Cole	(substituted off) 65'
HK	2	Tom Youngs	(substituted off) 48'
LP	1	Joe Marler	(substituted off) 65'
Replacements:
HK	16	Jamie George	(substituted on) 48'
PR	17	Mako Vunipola	(substituted on) 65'
PR	18	David Wilson	(substituted on) 65'
LK	19	Dave Attwood	(substituted on) 53'
N8	20	Nick Easter	(substituted on) 53'
SH	21	Danny Care	(substituted on) 48'
FH	22	Danny Cipriani	(substituted on) 63'
CE	23	Billy Twelvetrees	(substituted on) 63'
Coach:
(England) Stuart Lancaster

Touch judges:
John Lacey (Ireland)
Marius Mitrea (Italy)
Television match official:
Simon McDowell (Ireland)

Notes:

- Jamie George (England) made his international debut.
- Frédéric Michalak became France's top point scorer with 394 points, surpassing Christophe Lamaison's record of 380.

22 August 2015
16:00 EDT (UTC-04)

Canada	23–41	United States
Try: Paris 47' m Blevins 56' m Carpenter 77' c Con: Hirayama (1/2) 78'; Pen: McRorie (1/2) 3'; Drop: Hirayama (1/1) 17'	Report	Try: Peterson 28' c Durutalo 35' c Suniula 68' c Petri 73' c Dolan 80' c Con: MacGinty (5/5) 29', 36', 70', 75', 80'; Pen: MacGinty (2/3) 32', 51'

Twin Elm Rugby Park, Ottawa
Attendance: 5,168
Referee: Stuart Berry (South Africa)

Team details

FB	15	Harry Jones
RW	14	Phil Mackenzie	(substituted off) 70'
OC	13	Conor Trainor	(substituted off) 70'
IC	12	Nick Blevins
LW	11	Taylor Paris
FH	10	Nathan Hirayama
SH	9	Gordon McRorie	(substituted off) 54'
N8	8	Aaron Carpenter (c)
OF	7	John Moonlight
BF	6	Nanyak Dala	(substituted off) 75'
RL	5	Jon Phelan	(substituted off) 54'
LL	4	Tyler Hotson
TP	3	Doug Wooldridge	(substituted off) 57'
HK	2	Ray Barkwill	(substituted off) 15'	(substituted on) 26'	(substituted off) 75'
LP	1	Hubert Buydens	(substituted off) 57'
Replacements:
HK	16	Benoît Piffero	(substituted on) 15'	(substituted off) 26'	(substituted on) 75'
PR	17	Djustice Sears-Duru	(substituted on) 57'
PR	18	Andrew Tiedemann	(substituted on) 57'
LK	19	Evan Olmstead	(substituted on) 54'
FL	20	Kyle Gilmour	(substituted on) 75'
SH	21	Phil Mack	(substituted on) 54'
CE	22	Ciaran Hearn	(substituted on) 70'
WG	23	Matt Evans	(substituted on) 70'
Coach:
(New Zealand) Kieran Crowley

FB	15	Chris Wyles (c)
RW	14	Blaine Scully
OC	13	Seamus Kelly
IC	12	Thretton Palamo	(substituted off) 57'
LW	11	Brett Thompson
FH	10	AJ MacGinty
SH	9	Mike Petri	(substituted off) 75'
N8	8	Danny Barrett	(substituted off) 67'
OF	7	Andrew Durutalo
BF	6	Alastair McFarland	(substituted off) 75'
RL	5	Greg Peterson	(substituted off) 66'
LL	4	Cam Dolan
TP	3	Titi Lamositele	(substituted off) 64'
HK	2	Zach Fenoglio	(substituted off) 64'
LP	1	Eric Fry	(substituted off) 75'
Replacements:
HK	16	Phil Thiel	(substituted on) 64'
PR	17	Olive Kilifi	(substituted on) 75'
PR	18	Chris Baumann	(substituted on) 64'
LK	19	Louis Stanfill	(substituted on) 66'
FL	20	Matt Trouville	(substituted on) 75'
FL	21	John Quill	(substituted on) 62'
SH	22	Niku Kruger	(substituted on) 75'
CE	23	Andrew Suniula	(substituted on) 57'
Coach:
(United States) Mike Tolkin

Man of the Match:
Taylor Paris (Canada)

Touch judges:
Andrew McMaster (Canada)
Greg Garner (England)

Notes:

- Niku Kruger (United States) made his international debut.
- This win saw the United States claim their third consecutive win over Canada, setting a new record for their longest winning streak against Canada.
- 41 points was the most points the United States had ever scored against Canada.

=== Week 5 ===
28 August 2015
19:30 BST (UTC+01)

Nottingham (England)	14–69	Tonga
Try: Penalty try 29' c Skelcey 64' c Con: Rayner (2/2) 30', 65'	Report	Try: Veainu 2' c Fonua (4) 10' c, 39' c, 50' m, 61' m Helu (2) 20' m, 56' c Piutau 43' c Taione 53' c Takulua (2) 70' c, 78' m Con: Fosita (6/8) 3', 10', 40', 44', 54', 56'; Takulua (1/3) 71'

Lady Bay Sports Ground, Lady Bay
Attendance: 2,500
Referee: Ian Tempest (England)

28 August 2015
19:45 BST (UTC+01)

Newcastle Falcons (England)	27–7	Georgia
Try: Mayhew 15' m Catterick 43' m Tait 48' m McGuigan 70' m Harris 77' c Con: Willis (1/3) 78'	Report	Try: Gorgodze 53' c Con: Tsiklauri (1/1) 54'

Kingston Park, Newcastle upon Tyne
Attendance: 2,355
Referee: Lloyd Linton (Scotland)

29 August 2015
18:00 JST (UTC+09)

Japan	40–0	Uruguay
Try: Goromaru 12'; K. Ono 15' c Broadhurst 25' c Matsushima 44' c Tui 50' m Fukuoka 66' c Con: Goromaru (5/6) 13', 16', 26', 46', 68'	Report

Chichibunomiya Rugby Stadium, Tokyo
Attendance: 11,515
Referee: George Clancy (Ireland)

Team details

FB	15	Ayumu Goromaru
RW	14	Kotaro Matsushima
OC	13	Male Sa'u	(substituted off) 61'
IC	12	Craig Wing	(substituted off) 40'
LW	11	Kenki Fukuoka
FH	10	Kosei Ono
SH	9	Fumiaki Tanaka	(substituted off) 54'
N8	8	Hendrik Tui
OF	7	Michael Broadhurst
BF	6	Michael Leitch (c)
RL	5	Hitoshi Ono	(substituted off) 47'
LL	4	Luke Thompson
TP	3	Kensuke Hatakeyama	(substituted off) 57'
HK	2	Shota Horie	(substituted off) 60'
LP	1	Masataka Mikami	(substituted off) 51'
Replacements:
PR	16	Takayuki Watanabe	(substituted on) 51'
HK	17	Takeshi Kizu	(substituted on) 60'
PR	18	Hiroshi Yamashita	(substituted on) 57'
LK	19	Shinya Makabe	(substituted on) 47'	(substituted off) 67'
FL	20	Hayden Hopgood		(substituted on) 67'
SH	21	Atsushi Hiwasa	(substituted on) 54'
FH	22	Harumichi Tatekawa	(substituted on) 40'
WG	23	Karne Hesketh	(substituted on) 61'
Coach:
(Australia) Eddie Jones

FB	15	Gastón Mieres		(substituted off) 46'
RW	14	Leandro Leivas
OC	13	Joaquín Prada		(substituted off) 70'
IC	12	Andrés Vilaseca
LW	11	Santiago Gibernau
FH	10	Felipe Berchesi
SH	9	Agustín Ormaechea	(yellow card) 4'
N8	8	Alejandro Nieto
OF	7	Diego Magno		(substituted off) 40'
BF	6	Juan Manuel Gaminara	(yellow card) 81'
RL	5	Jorge Zerbino		(substituted off) 54'
LL	4	Santiago Vilaseca (c)		(substituted off) 48'
TP	3	Mario Sagario		(substituted off) 70'
HK	2	Carlos Arboleya		(substituted off) 45'
LP	1	Alejo Corral		(substituted off) 52'
Replacements:
HK	16	Germán Kessler		(substituted on) 45'
PR	17	Oscar Durán		(substituted on) 70'
PR	18	Mateo Sanguinetti		(substituted on) 52'
LK	19	Mathias Palomeque		(substituted on) 48'
FL	20	Matías Beer		(substituted on) 40'
FL	21	Juan de Freitas		(substituted on) 54'
SH	22	Alejo Durán		(substituted on) 70'
CE	23	Alberto Román		(substituted on) 46'
Coach:
(Uruguay) Pablo Lemoine

Touch judges:
Leighton Hodges (Wales)
Shuhei Kubo (Japan)

29 August 2015
14:30 WEST (UTC+01)

Ireland	10–16	Wales
Try: Henderson 40' c Con: Sexton (1/1) 40'; Pen: Sexton (1/1) 28'	Report	Try: Tipuric 23' c Con: Halfpenny (1/1) 25'; Pen: Halfpenny (3/3) 17', 63', 70'

Aviva Stadium, Dublin
Attendance: 47,430
Referee: Craig Joubert (South Africa)

Team details

FB	15	Rob Kearney
RW	14	David Kearney
OC	13	Luke Fitzgerald	(substituted off) 67'
IC	12	Robbie Henshaw
LW	11	Keith Earls	(substituted off) 63'
FH	10	Johnny Sexton	(substituted off) 63'
SH	9	Conor Murray	(substituted off) 63'
N8	8	Jamie Heaslip
OF	7	Jordi Murphy
BF	6	Peter O'Mahony	(substituted off) 50'
RL	5	Paul O'Connell (c)
LL	4	Iain Henderson
TP	3	Nathan White	(substituted off) 56'
HK	2	Richardt Strauss	(substituted off) 50'
LP	1	Jack McGrath	(substituted off) 60'
Replacements:
HK	16	Seán Cronin	(substituted on) 50'
PR	17	Dave Kilcoyne	(substituted on) 60'
PR	18	Tadhg Furlong	(substituted on) 56'
LK	19	Donnacha Ryan	(substituted on) 67'
FL	20	Seán O'Brien	(substituted on) 50'
SH	21	Eoin Reddan	(substituted on) 63'
FH	22	Paddy Jackson	(substituted on) 63'
FB	23	Felix Jones	(substituted on) 63'
Coach:
(New Zealand) Joe Schmidt

FB	15	Leigh Halfpenny
RW	14	Alex Cuthbert
OC	13	Scott Williams
IC	12	Jamie Roberts	(substituted off) 61'
LW	11	George North
FH	10	Dan Biggar	(substituted off) 63'
SH	9	Rhys Webb	(substituted off) 63'
N8	8	Taulupe Faletau
OF	7	Justin Tipuric
BF	6	Dan Lydiate	50' to 60'
RL	5	Alun Wyn Jones (c)			(substituted off) 72'
LL	4	Bradley Davies	(substituted off) 53'
TP	3	Tomas Francis	(substituted off) 53'
HK	2	Ken Owens	(substituted off) 53'
LP	1	Gethin Jenkins	(substituted off) 46'
Replacements:
HK	16	Scott Baldwin	(substituted on) 53'
PR	17	Paul James	(substituted on) 46'
PR	18	Aaron Jarvis	(substituted on) 53'
LK	19	Luke Charteris	(substituted on) 53'
FL	20	James King	(substituted on) 50'	(substituted off) 60'	(substituted on) 72'
SH	21	Gareth Davies	(substituted on) 63'
FH	22	Rhys Priestland	(substituted on) 63'
WG	23	Hallam Amos	(substituted on) 61'
Coach:
(New Zealand) Warren Gatland

Man of the Match:
Justin Tipuric (Wales)

Touch judges:
Wayne Barnes (England)
Luke Pearce (England)
Television match official:
Graham Hughes (England)

Notes:

- Tadhg Furlong (Ireland) and Tomas Francis (Wales) made their international debuts.
- George North (Wales) earned his 50th test cap, the youngest player to do so for any nation.
- This was Ireland's first loss at home since their 24–22 loss to New Zealand during the 2013 end of year tests.

29 August 2015
15:00 BST (UTC+01)

Barbarians	27–24	Samoa
Try: Thomson (2) 1' m, 49' m Gill 23' c Tapuai (2) 29' m, 63' m Con: Lealiifano (1/5) 24' c	Report	Try: Perenise 5' c K. Pisi 34' c Lam 53' c Con: T. Pisi (2/2) 6', 35; Nanai-Williams (1/1) 54'; Pen: T. Pisi (1/2) 19'

Olympic Stadium, London
Attendance: 41,039
Referee: John Lacey (Ireland)

Team details

FB	15	(Samoa) Paul Williams				(substituted off) 40'
RW	14	(Fiji) Taqele Naiyaravoro
OC	13	(Australia) Ben Tapuai
IC	12	(South Africa) Wynand Olivier
LW	11	(New Zealand) Dwayne Sweeney		(substituted off) 54'
FH	10	(Australia) Christian Lealiifano
SH	9	(Australia) Luke Burgess		(substituted off) 54'
N8	8	(South Africa) Pierre Spies		(substituted off) 40'
OF	7	(Australia) Liam Gill
BF	6	(New Zealand) Adam Thomson
RL	5	(Australia) Luke Jones
LL	4	(South Africa) Bakkies Botha (c)		(substituted off) 54'
TP	3	(New Zealand) Carl Hayman		(substituted off) 54'
HK	2	(Australia) Saia Fainga'a	(yellow card) 16'	(substituted off) 54'
LP	1	(Australia) Benn Robinson		(substituted off) 59'
Replacements:
HK	16	(Australia) Tolu Latu		(substituted on) 54'
PR	17	(New Zealand) Josh Hohneck		(substituted on) 54'
PR	18	(Scotland) Kyle Traynor		(substituted on) 59'
LK	19	(New Zealand) Ali Williams		(substituted on) 54'
FL	20	(South Africa) Jacques Potgieter		(substituted on) 40'
SH	21	(South Africa) Nic Groom		(substituted on) 54'
FH	22	(Australia) Mike Harris		(substituted on) 14'	(substituted off) 23'	(substituted on) 40'
WG	23	(Australia) Tom English		(substituted on) 54'
Coach:
(New Zealand) Jamie Joseph

FB	15	Tim Nanai-Williams
RW	14	Fa'atoina Autagavaia		(substituted off) 69'
OC	13	Paul Perez
IC	12	Rey Lee-Lo
LW	11	Ken Pisi
FH	10	Tusi Pisi		(substituted off) 54'
SH	9	Kahn Fotuali'i		(substituted off) 40'
N8	8	Ofisa Treviranus (c)		(substituted off) 65'
OF	7	Jack Lam
BF	6	Maurie Fa'asavalu		(substituted off) 50'
RL	5	Kane Thompson	(red card) 16'
LL	4	Filo Paulo
TP	3	Anthony Perenise		(substituted off) 70'
HK	2	Ole Avei		(substituted off) 54'
LP	1	Sakaria Taulafo
Replacements:
HK	16	Manu Leiataua		(substituted on) 54'
PR	17	Viliamu Afatia
PR	18	Jake Grey		(substituted on) 70'
FL	19	Faifili Levave		(substituted on) 50'
N8	20	Sanele Vavae Tuilagi		(substituted on) 65'
SH	21	Vavao Afemai		(substituted on) 40'
FH	22	Patrick Fa'apale	(yellow card) 71'	(substituted on) 54'
CE	23	Johnny Leota		(substituted on) 69'
Coach:
(Samoa) Stephen Betham

Touch judges:
Greg Garner (England)
Paul Dix (England)
Television match official:
Sean Davey (England)

29 August 2015
15:15 BST (UTC+01)

Scotland	48–7	Italy
Try: Lamont (2) 8' c, 61' m Barclay 38' c Visser (2) 47' m, 71' c Bennett 79' m Con: Laidlaw (2/4) 9', 38'; Russell (1/2) 72'; Pen: Laidlaw (4/4) 4', 22', 26', 55'	Report	Try: Campagnaro 29' c Con: Allan (1/1) 30'

Murrayfield Stadium, Edinburgh
Attendance: 43,831
Referee: Romain Poite (France)

Team details

FB	15	Stuart Hogg	(substituted off) 68'
RW	14	Sean Lamont
OC	13	Mark Bennett
IC	12	Peter Horne	(substituted off) 51'
LW	11	Tim Visser
FH	10	Finn Russell
SH	9	Greig Laidlaw (c)	(substituted off) 65'
N8	8	David Denton
OF	7	John Barclay	(substituted off) 60'
BF	6	Ryan Wilson
RL	5	Jonny Gray
LL	4	Grant Gilchrist	(substituted off) 60'
TP	3	WP Nel	(substituted off) 62'
HK	2	Ross Ford	(substituted off) 57'
LP	1	Alasdair Dickinson	(substituted off) 60'
Replacements:
HK	16	Stuart McInally	(substituted on) 57'
PR	17	Gordon Reid	(substituted on) 60'
PR	18	Jon Welsh	(substituted on) 62'
LK	19	Rob Harley	(substituted on) 60'
FL	20	Blair Cowan	(substituted on) 60'
SH	21	Henry Pyrgos	(substituted on) 65'
FH	22	Ruaridh Jackson	(substituted on) 68'
CE	23	Matt Scott	(substituted on) 51'
Coach:
(New Zealand) Vern Cotter

FB	15	Luke McLean
RW	14	Angelo Esposito		(substituted off) 51'
OC	13	Michele Campagnaro
IC	12	Luca Morisi
LW	11	Leonardo Sarto
FH	10	Tommaso Allan		(substituted off) 73'
SH	9	Guglielmo Palazzani		(substituted off) 73'
N8	8	Samuela Vunisa			(substituted off) 74'	(substituted on) 78'
OF	7	Francesco Minto	(yellow card) 37'	(substituted off) 64'
BF	6	Alessandro Zanni
RL	5	Joshua Furno
LL	4	Marco Fuser		(substituted off) 55'
TP	3	Martin Castrogiovanni		(substituted off) 55'	(substituted on) 74'	(substituted off) 78'
HK	2	Leonardo Ghiraldini (c)		(substituted off) 64'
LP	1	Matías Agüero		(substituted off) 33'
Replacements:
HK	16	Andrea Manici		(substituted on) 64'
PR	17	Michele Rizzo	(yellow card) 68'	(substituted on) 33'
PR	18	Dario Chistolini		(substituted on) 55'
LK	19	Quintin Geldenhuys		(substituted on) 55'
FL	20	Mauro Bergamasco		(substituted on) 64'
SH	21	Marcello Violi		(substituted on) 73'
FH	22	Carlo Canna		(substituted on) 73'
FB	23	Andrea Masi		(substituted on) 51'
Coach:
(France) Jacques Brunel

Man of the Match:
Alasdair Dickinson (Scotland)

Touch judges:
JP Doyle (England)
Mathieu Raynal (France)
Television match official:
Shaun Veldsman (South Africa)

Notes:

- This was Scotland's largest winning margin over Italy of 41 points, surpassing the previous 38 point margin in 2003.
- The 48 points was also the most points scored by Scotland over Italy.

29 August 2015
15:00 ADT (UTC-03)

Canada	19–12	(Scotland) Glasgow Warriors
Try: Cudmore 15' c Evans 26' c Van der Merwe 75' m Con: Hirayama (2/2) 16', 27'	Report	Try: G. Bryce 3' m Bulumakau 69' c Con: Wight (1/1) 70'

Graves-Oakley Memorial Park, Halifax
Attendance: 4,812
Referee: Chris Assmus (Canada)

30 August 2015
15:30 EDT (UTC-04)

United States	19–24	(England) Harlequins
Try: Palamo 19' m Test 80' m Pen: MacGinty (2/5) 4', 5'; Niua (1/1) 60'	Report	Try: Dickson 29' c Wallace (2) 35' c, 67' c Con: N. Evans (2/2) 30', 36'; Botica (1/1) 68'; Pen: Botica (1/1) 78'

PPL Park, Chester
Referee: Kurt Weaver (United States)

=== Week 6 ===
2 September 2015
19:30 BST (UTC+01)

Georgia	15–16	Canada
Try: Tkhilaishvili 28' c Tsiklauri 74' m Con: Malaghuradze (1/2) 28'; Pen: Malaghuradze (1/1) 13'	Report	Try: Tiedemann 4' c Con: Hirayama (1/1) 5'; Pen: Hirayama (3/4) 19', 33', 46'

Molesey Road, Esher, Surrey
Referee: JP Doyle (England)

Team details

FB	15	Beka Tsiklauri
RW	14	Giorgi Pruidze
OC	13	Merab Sharikadze	(substituted off) 46'
IC	12	Tamaz Mchedlidze
LW	11	Giorgi Pruidze
FH	10	Lasha Malaghuradze	(substituted off) 74'
SH	9	Giorgi Begadze	(substituted off) 57'
N8	8	Lasha Lomidze	(substituted off) 60'
OF	7	Mamuka Gorgodze (c)
BF	6	Giorgi Tkhilaishvili
RL	5	Levan Datunashvili	(substituted off) 60'
LL	4	Giorgi Nemsadze
TP	3	Levan Chilachava	(substituted off) 69'
HK	2	Shalva Mamukashvili	(substituted off) 52'
LP	1	Kakha Asieshvili	(substituted off) 57'
Replacements:
HK	16	Jaba Bregvadze	(substituted on) 52'
PR	17	Mikheil Nariashvili	(substituted on) 57'
PR	18	Davit Zirakashvili	(substituted on) 69'
LK	19	Konstantin Mikautadze	(substituted on) 60'
LK	20	Giorgi Chkhaidze	(substituted on) 60'
SH	21	Vazha Khutsishvili	(substituted on) 57'
FH	22	Lasha Khmaladze	(substituted on) 74'
WG	23	Davit Kacharava	(substituted on) 46'
Coach:
(New Zealand) Milton Haig

FB	15	Matt Evans		(substituted off) 52'
RW	14	Jeff Hassler		(substituted off) 71'
OC	13	Ciaran Hearn
IC	12	Nick Blevins	Booked
LW	11	Phil Mackenzie
FH	10	Nathan Hirayama
SH	9	Jamie Mackenzie		(substituted off) 65'
N8	8	Aaron Carpenter
OF	7	John Moonlight
BF	6	Jebb Sinclair		(substituted off) 60'
RL	5	Jamie Cudmore (c)		(substituted off) 60'
LL	4	Brett Beukeboom
TP	3	Andrew Tiedemann
HK	2	Ray Barkwill		(substituted off) 68'
LP	1	Djustice Sears-Duru		(substituted off) 60'
Replacements:
HK	16	Benoît Piffero		(substituted on) 68'
PR	17	Hubert Buydens		(substituted on) 60'
PR	18	Jason Marshall
LK	19	Evan Olmstead		(substituted on) 60'
FL	20	Kyle Gilmour		(substituted on) 60'
SH	21	Gordon McRorie		(substituted on) 65'
CE	22	Conor Trainor		(substituted on) 71'
FB	23	Harry Jones		(substituted on) 52'
Coach:
(New Zealand) Kieran Crowley

Touch judges:
Luke Pearce (England)
Greg Garner (England)

Notes:

- Giorgi Nemsadze (Georgia) earned his 50th test cap.

5 September 2015
14:30 BST (UTC+01)

England	21–13	Ireland
Try: May 2' c Watson 13' m Con: Ford (1/2) 4'; Pen: Ford (1/1) 46'; Farrell (2/2) 72', 77'	Report	Try: O'Connell 52' c Con: Sexton (1/1) 53'; Pen: Sexton (2/2) 7', 49'

Twickenham, London
Attendance: 80,138
Referee: Nigel Owens (Wales)

Team details

FB	15	Mike Brown
RW	14	Anthony Watson
OC	13	Jonathan Joseph
IC	12	Brad Barritt	(substituted off) 59'
LW	11	Jonny May
FH	10	George Ford	(substituted off) 59'
SH	9	Ben Youngs	(substituted off) 59'
N8	8	Ben Morgan	(substituted off) 55'
OF	7	Chris Robshaw (c)
BF	6	Tom Wood
RL	5	Geoff Parling	12' to 18'		(substituted off) 44'
LL	4	Courtney Lawes
TP	3	Dan Cole	(substituted off) 61'
HK	2	Tom Youngs	(substituted off) 59'
LP	1	Joe Marler	(substituted off) 55'
Replacements:
HK	16	Jamie George	(substituted on) 59'
PR	17	Mako Vunipola	(substituted on) 55'
PR	18	Kieran Brookes	(substituted on) 61'
LK	19	Joe Launchbury	(substituted on) 12'	(substituted off) 18'	(substituted on) 44'
N8	20	Billy Vunipola	(substituted on) 55'
SH	21	Richard Wigglesworth	(substituted on) 59'
FH	22	Owen Farrell	(substituted on) 59'
CE	23	Sam Burgess	(substituted on) 59'
Coach:
(England) Stuart Lancaster

FB	15	Simon Zebo	(substituted off) 69'
RW	14	Tommy Bowe
OC	13	Jared Payne
IC	12	Robbie Henshaw	(substituted off) 59'
LW	11	David Kearney	59' to 65'
FH	10	Johnny Sexton		(substituted off) 65'
SH	9	Conor Murray	(substituted off) 16'
N8	8	Jamie Heaslip
OF	7	Seán O'Brien	(substituted off) 60'
BF	6	Peter O'Mahony
RL	5	Paul O'Connell (c)	(substituted off) 65'
LL	4	Devin Toner
TP	3	Mike Ross	(substituted off) 59'
HK	2	Rory Best	(substituted off) 60'
LP	1	Jack McGrath
Replacements:
HK	16	Richardt Strauss	(substituted on) 60'
PR	17	Tadhg Furlong	(substituted on) 69'
PR	18	Nathan White	(substituted on) 59'
LK	19	Donnacha Ryan	(substituted on) 65'
FL	20	Chris Henry	(substituted on) 60'
SH	21	Eoin Reddan	(substituted on) 16'
FH	22	Ian Madigan	(substituted on) 59'
CE	23	Darren Cave	(substituted on) 59'
Coach:
(New Zealand) Joe Schmidt

Man of the Match:
Tom Wood (England)

Touch judges:
Romain Poite (France)
Leighton Hodges (Wales)
Television match official:
Shaun Veldsman (South Africa)

5 September 2015
15:00 BST (UTC+01)

Leicester Tigers (England)	34–55	Argentina
Try: Brugnara 30' c Beckett 61' c Burns 66' c Odogwu 68' c Con: Bell (1/1) 30'; Burns (3/3) 62', 67', 69'; Pen: Bell (2/2) 10', 40'	Report	Try: Cordero 6' c Bosch 12' c Imhoff 20' c Sánchez 38' c Montoya 48' m Agulla (2) 58' m, 80' c Socino 72' m Leguizamón 78' m Con: Sánchez (4/4) 7', 13', 20', 38'; Socino (1/5) 80'

Welford Road, Leicester
Referee: Tim Wigglesworth (England)

5 September 2015
16:30 BST (UTC+01)

Wasps (England)	19–25	Samoa
Try: Hughes 4' m Wade 27' c Gaskell 76' c Con: Gopperth (1/2) 28'; Lozowski (1/1) 77'	Report	Try: Levave 51' c Autagavaia 56' m Faosiliva 78' c Con: Stanley (1/2) 51'; Fa’apale (1/1) 80'; Pen: Stanley (2/3) 30', 41'

Ricoh Arena, Coventry
Attendance: 10,898
Referee: Neil Hennesey (Wales)

5 September 2015
16:45 BST (UTC+01)

Japan	13–10	Georgia
Try: Mafi 77' c Con: Goromaru (1/1) 78'; Pen: Goromaru (2/3) 2', 26'	Report	Try: Giorgadze 15' c Con: Kvirikashvili (1/1) 16'; Pen: Malaghuradze (1/2) 70'

Kingsholm Stadium, Gloucester
Referee: John Lacey (Ireland)

Team details

FB	15	Ayumu Goromaru
RW	14	Yoshikazu Fujita		(substituted off) 46'
OC	13	Male Sa'u
IC	12	Craig Wing
LW	11	Hendrik Tui
FH	10	Harumichi Tatekawa		(substituted off) 49'
SH	9	Fumiaki Tanaka		(substituted off) 62'
N8	8	Koliniasi Holani		(substituted off) 46'
OF	7	Michael Broadhurst
BF	6	Michael Leitch (c)
RL	5	Luke Thompson
LL	4	Hitoshi Ono		(substituted off) 54'
TP	3	Hiroshi Yamashita		(substituted off) 34'
HK	2	Shota Horie	(yellow card) 31'	(substituted off) 74'
LP	1	Masataka Mikami
Replacements:
PR	16	Takayuki Watanabe
HK	17	Takeshi Kizu		(substituted on) 74'
PR	18	Kensuke Hatakeyama		(substituted on) 34'
LK	19	Shinya Makabe		(substituted on) 54'
N8	20	Amanaki Mafi		(substituted on) 46'
SH	21	Atsushi Hiwasa		(substituted on) 62'
FH	22	Kosei Ono		(substituted on) 49'
CE	23	Kotaro Matsushima		(substituted on) 46'
Coach:
(Australia) Eddie Jones

FB	15	Merab Kvirikashvili
RW	14	Muraz Giorgadze
OC	13	Davit Kacharava
IC	12	Merab Sharikadze		(substituted off) 58'
LW	11	Giorgi Aptsiauri
FH	10	Lasha Malaghuradze
SH	9	Vasil Lobzhanidze		(substituted off) 55'
N8	8	Mamuka Gorgodze (c)		(substituted off) 67'
OF	7	Vito Kolelishvili	(yellow card) 27'
BF	6	Shalva Sutiashvili
RL	5	Kote Mikautadze
LL	4	Giorgi Nemsadze		(substituted off) 60'
TP	3	Davit Zirakashvili		(substituted off) 60'
HK	2	Jaba Bregvadze		(substituted off) 49'
LP	1	Mikheil Nariashvili		(substituted off) 60'
Replacements:
HK	16	Shalva Mamukashvili		(substituted on) 49'
PR	17	Davit Kubriashvili		(substituted on) 60'
PR	18	Levan Chilachava		(substituted on) 60'
LK	19	Levan Datunashvili		(substituted on) 60'
LK	20	Giorgi Chkhaidze		(substituted on) 67'
SH	21	Giorgi Begadze		(substituted on) 55'
CE	22	Tamaz Mchedlidze		(substituted on) 58'
WG	23	Giorgi Pruidze
Coach:
(New Zealand) Milton Haig

Touch judges:
Marius Mitrea (Italy)
Tom Foley (England)
Television match official:
Simon Adams (England)

Notes:

- Davit Zirakashvili (Georgia) earned his 50th test caps.

5 September 2015
17:00 BST (UTC+01)

Wales	23–19	Italy
Try: North 12' m Pen: Halfpenny (5/5) 28', 48', 61', 64', 68'; Biggar (1/1) 74'	Report	Try: Sarto 2' m Palazzani 80' m Pen: Allan (2/2) 9', 31'; Drop: Canna (1/1) 62'

Millennium Stadium, Cardiff
Attendance: 52,981
Referee: George Clancy (Ireland)

Team details

FB	15	Leigh Halfpenny			(substituted off) 69'
RW	14	Alex Cuthbert	(substituted off) 20'	(substituted on) 26'
OC	13	Cory Allen
IC	12	Scott Williams
LW	11	George North
FH	10	Dan Biggar
SH	9	Rhys Webb	(substituted off) 26'
N8	8	Taulupe Faletau	(substituted off) 63'
OF	7	Sam Warburton (c)
BF	6	James King
RL	5	Dominic Day
LL	4	Jake Ball	(substituted off) 53'
TP	3	Tomas Francis	(substituted off) 63'
HK	2	Ken Owens	(substituted off) 68'
LP	1	Gethin Jenkins	(substituted off) 53'
Replacements:
HK	16	Kristian Dacey	(substituted on) 68'
PR	17	Paul James	(substituted on) 53'
PR	18	Aaron Jarvis	(substituted on) 63'
LK	19	Luke Charteris	(substituted on) 53'
FL	20	Ross Moriarty	(substituted on) 63'
SH	21	Gareth Davies	(substituted on) 26'
FH	22	Rhys Priestland
FB	23	Matthew Morgan	(substituted on) 20'	(substituted off) 26'	(substituted on) 69'
Coach:
(New Zealand) Warren Gatland

FB	15	Andrea Masi
RW	14	Leonardo Sarto
OC	13	Luca Morisi	(substituted off) 4'
IC	12	Gonzalo Garcia	(substituted off) 65'
LW	11	Giovanbattista Venditti
FH	10	Tommaso Allan	(substituted off) 58'
SH	9	Edoardo Gori
N8	8	Sergio Parisse (c)	(substituted off) 65'
OF	7	Francesco Minto
BF	6	Alessandro Zanni
RL	5	Joshua Furno	(substituted off) 65'
LL	4	Quintin Geldenhuys
TP	3	Martin Castrogiovanni	(substituted off) 40'
HK	2	Leonardo Ghiraldini	(substituted off) 75'
LP	1	Michele Rizzo	(substituted off) 52'
Replacements:
HK	16	Andrea Manici	(substituted on) 75'
PR	17	Matías Agüero	(substituted on) 52'
PR	18	Lorenzo Cittadini	(substituted on) 40'
LK	19	Valerio Bernabò	(substituted on) 65'
FL	20	Samuela Vunisa	(substituted on) 65'
SH	21	Guglielmo Palazzani	(substituted on) 65'
FH	22	Carlo Canna	(substituted on) 58'
WG	23	Luke McLean	(substituted on) 4'
Coach:
(France) Jacques Brunel

Man of the Match:
Scott Williams (Wales)

Touch judges:
Greg Garner (England)
Dudley Phillips (Ireland)
Television match official:
Simon McDowell (Ireland)

5 September 2015
21:00 EEST (UTC+03)

Romania	16–21	Tonga
Try: Rădoi 79' c Con: Vlaicu (1/1) 80'; Pen: Vlaicu (3/3) 30', 38', 58'	Report	Try: Penalty try 26' c Takulua 69' m Con: Morath (1/2) 27'; Pen: Morath (3/4) 40' 62', 73'

Stadionul Arcul de Triumf, Bucharest
Referee: Pascal Gaüzère (France)

Team details

FB	15	Cătălin Fercu
RW	14	Mădălin Lemnaru
OC	13	Paula Kinikinilau
IC	12	Florin Vlaicu
LW	11	Adrian Apostol
FH	10	Dănuț Dumbravă	(substituted off) 58'
SH	9	Florin Surugiu
N8	8	Mihai Macovei (c)
OF	7	Viorel Lucaci	(substituted off) 70'
BF	6	Valentin Ursache
RL	5	Johan van Heerden
LL	4	Valentin Popârlan	(substituted off) 68'
TP	3	Paulică Ion	(substituted off) 62'
HK	2	Otar Turashvili	(substituted off) 52'
LP	1	Andrei Ursache	(substituted off) 62'
Replacements:
HK	16	Andrei Rădoi	(substituted on) 52'
PR	17	Mihai Lazăr	(substituted on) 62'
PR	18	Horațiu Pungea	(substituted on) 62'
LK	19	Marius Antonescu	(substituted on) 68'
N8	20	Daniel Carpo	(substituted on) 70'
SH	21	Valentin Calafeteanu
WG	22	Ionuț Botezatu
CE	23	Csaba Gál	(substituted on) 58'
Coach:
(Wales) Lynn Howells

FB	15	Telusa Veainu
RW	14	David Halaifonua
OC	13	William Helu	(substituted off) 71'
IC	12	Siale Piutau
LW	11	Fetuʻu Vainikolo	(substituted off) 54'
FH	10	Kurt Morath
SH	9	Sonatane Takulua
N8	8	Sione Kalamafoni
OF	7	Nili Latu (c)
BF	6	Steve Mafi	(substituted off) 68'
RL	5	Joe Tuineau	(substituted off) 58'
LL	4	Tukulua Lokotui
TP	3	Halani Aulika	(substituted off) 62'
HK	2	Elvis Taione	(substituted off) 40'
LP	1	Soane Tongaʻuiha	(substituted off) 57'
Replacements:
HK	16	Paul Ngauamo	(substituted on) 40'
PR	17	Sila Puafisi	(substituted on) 57'
PR	18	Sona Taumalolo	(substituted on) 62'
FL	19	Hale T-Pole	(substituted on) 58'
N8	20	Viliami Maʻafu	(substituted on) 68'
SH	21	Sosefo Ma’ake
FH	22	Latiume Fosita	(substituted on) 71'
FB	23	Vunga Lilo	(substituted on) 54'
Coach:
(Tonga) Mana Otai

Touch judges:
Mathieu Raynal (France)
Alexandre Ruiz (France)

Notes:

- Florin Surugiu (Romania) earned his 50th test cap.
- Paula Kinikinilau and Johan van Heerden (Romania) made their international debuts.
- This was Tonga's first ever win over Romania.

5 September 2015
21:00 CEST (UTC+02)

France	19–16	Scotland
Try: Nakaitaci 72'; Con: Parra (1/1) 73'; Pen: Michalak (3/4) 17', 30', 43'; Spedding (1/1) 58'	Report	Try: Seymour 60' c Con: Laidlaw (1/1) 61'; Pen: Laidlaw (3/3) 8', 21', 40'

Stade de France, Saint-Denis
Attendance: 47,200
Referee: Wayne Barnes (England)

Team details

FB	15	Scott Spedding
RW	14	Yoann Huget
OC	13	Mathieu Bastareaud
IC	12	Wesley Fofana	(substituted off) 34'
LW	11	Noa Nakaitaci
FH	10	Frédéric Michalak	(substituted off) 72'
SH	9	Sébastien Tillous-Borde	(substituted off) 59'
N8	8	Louis Picamoles	(substituted off) 65'
OF	7	Damien Chouly
BF	6	Thierry Dusautoir (c)
RL	5	Alexandre Flanquart
LL	4	Pascal Papé	(substituted off) 52'
TP	3	Rabah Slimani	(substituted off) 3'	(substituted on) 8'	(substituted off) 56'
HK	2	Guilhem Guirado	(substituted off) 56'
LP	1	Eddy Ben Arous	(substituted off) 56'
Replacements:
HK	16	Dimitri Szarzewski	(substituted on) 56'
PR	17	Vincent Debaty	(substituted on) 56'
PR	18	Nicolas Mas	(substituted on) 3'	(substituted off) 8'	(substituted on) 56'
FL	19	Bernard Le Roux	(substituted on) 52'
FL	20	Yannick Nyanga	(substituted on) 65'
SH	21	Morgan Parra	(substituted on) 59'
FH	22	Rémi Talès	(substituted on) 72'
CE	23	Alexandre Dumoulin	(substituted on) 34'
Coach:
(France) Philippe Saint-André

FB	15	Sean Maitland
RW	14	Tommy Seymour		(substituted off) 67'
OC	13	Mark Bennett
IC	12	Matt Scott
LW	11	Tim Visser
FH	10	Finn Russell
SH	9	Greig Laidlaw (c)
N8	8	David Denton	(yellow card) 70'
OF	7	John Hardie
BF	6	Ryan Wilson		(substituted off) 6'
RL	5	Jonny Gray		(substituted off) 62'
LL	4	Richie Gray
TP	3	WP Nel		(substituted off) 59'
HK	2	Ross Ford		(substituted off) 64'
LP	1	Alasdair Dickinson		(substituted off) 6'
Replacements:
HK	16	Fraser Brown		(substituted on) 64'
PR	17	Gordon Reid		(substituted on) 6'
PR	18	Jon Welsh		(substituted on) 59'
LK	19	Tim Swinson		(substituted on) 62'
FL	20	Alasdair Strokosch		(substituted on) 53'
SH	21	Sam Hidalgo-Clyne
FH	22	Duncan Weir
WG	23	Sean Lamont		(substituted on) 67'
Coach:
(New Zealand) Vern Cotter

Touch judges:
JP Doyle (England)
Luke Pearce (England)
Television match official:
Graham Hughes (England)

5 September 2015
18:30 CDT (UTC-05)

United States	10–47	Australia
Try: Petri 31' c Con: MacGinty (1/1) 33'; Pen: MacGinty (1/1) 19'	Report	Try: Foley 8' c Phipps 14' c McMahon 48' c Mumm 54' c Beale 69' c Cooper 74' c Naiyaravoro 78' m Con: Foley (6/7) 9', 15', 49', 55', 70', 74'

Soldier Field, Chicago
Attendance: 23,212
Referee: Jaco Peyper (South Africa)

Team details

FB	15	Blaine Scully	(substituted off) 15'	(substituted on) 21'
RW	14	Takudzwa Ngwenya
OC	13	Seamus Kelly
IC	12	Thretton Palamo			(substituted off) 75'
LW	11	Chris Wyles (c)
FH	10	AJ MacGinty	(substituted off) 71'
SH	9	Mike Petri
N8	8	Samu Manoa	(substituted off) 40'
OF	7	Andrew Durutalo
BF	6	Alastair McFarland	(substituted off) 38'
RL	5	Greg Peterson
LL	4	Cam Dolan	(substituted off) 58'
TP	3	Titi Lamositele	(substituted off) 58'
HK	2	Zach Fenoglio	(substituted off) 4'	(substituted on) 10'	(substituted off) 56'
LP	1	Eric Fry	(substituted off) 56'
Replacements:
HK	16	Phil Thiel	(substituted on) 4'	(substituted off) 10'	(substituted on) 56'
PR	17	Olive Kilifi	(substituted on) 56'
PR	18	Chris Baumann	(substituted on) 58'
LK	19	Louis Stanfill	(substituted on) 58'
FL	20	John Quill	(substituted on) 40'
N8	21	Danny Barrett	(substituted on) 38'
FH	22	Shalom Suniula	(substituted on) 71'
CE	23	Folau Niua	(substituted on) 15'	(substituted off) 21'	(substituted on) 75'
Coach:
(United States) Mike Tolkin

FB	15	Kurtley Beale
RW	14	Joe Tomane
OC	13	Henry Speight
IC	12	Matt Giteau	(substituted off) 55'
LW	11	Rob Horne	(substituted off) 70'
FH	10	Bernard Foley
SH	9	Nick Phipps	(substituted off) 46'
N8	8	Wycliff Palu	(substituted off) 50'
OF	7	Sean McMahon
BF	6	Ben McCalman
RL	5	Rob Simmons	(substituted off) 46'
LL	4	Kane Douglas
TP	3	Greg Holmes	(substituted off) 56'
HK	2	Tatafu Polota-Nau	(substituted off) 58'
LP	1	James Slipper (c)	(substituted off) 65'
Replacements:
HK	16	James Hanson	(substituted on) 58'
PR	17	Scott Sio	(substituted on) 65'
PR	18	Toby Smith	(substituted on) 56'
LK	19	Dean Mumm	(substituted on) 46'
LK	20	Sam Carter	(substituted on) 50'
SH	21	Will Genia	(substituted on) 46'
FH	22	Quade Cooper	(substituted on) 55'
WG	23	Taqele Naiyaravoro	(substituted on) 70'
Coach:
(Australia) Michael Cheika

Man of the Match:
Sean McMahon

Touch judges:
Joaquín Montes (Uruguay)
Dave Smortchevsky (Canada)
Television match official:
Andrew McMaster (Canada)

Notes:

- Chris Wyles (United States) earned his 50th test cap.
- Taqele Naiyaravoro and Toby Smith (both Australia) made their international debuts.

6 September 2015
14:30 BST (UTC+01)

Canada	18–47	Fiji
Try: Trainor 33' m Van der Merwe (2) 69' m, 71' m Pen: McRorie (1/1) 16'	Report	Try: Matawalu (2) 22' c, 37' c Nayacalevu (2) 25' c, 60' c Talebula 78' c Con: Nadolo (5/5) 23', 26', 38', 61', 79'; Pen: Nadolo (4/4) 8', 12', 30', 63'

Twickenham Stoop, London
Referee: Mathieu Raynal (France)

Team details

FB	15	Harry Jones	(substituted off) 45'
RW	14	Phil Mackenzie	(substituted off) 71'
OC	13	Conor Trainor
IC	12	Connor Braid
LW	11	D. T. H. van der Merwe
FH	10	Liam Underwood
SH	9	Gordon McRorie	(substituted off) 66'
N8	8	Richard Thorpe
OF	7	Nanyak Dala
BF	6	Kyle Gilmour
RL	5	Jamie Cudmore (c)	(substituted off) 52'
LL	4	Evan Olmstead
TP	3	Jason Marshall	(substituted off) 13'
HK	2	Benoît Piffero	(substituted off) 52'
LP	1	Hubert Buydens	(substituted off) 52'
Replacements:
HK	16	Aaron Carpenter	(substituted on) 52'
PR	17	Djustice Sears-Duru	(substituted on) 52'
PR	18	Jake Ilnicki	(substituted on) 13'
FL	19	Jebb Sinclair	(substituted on) 52'
FL	20	John Moonlight
SH	21	Phil Mack	(substituted on) 66'
CE	22	Ciaran Hearn	(substituted on) 45'
CE	23	Nick Blevins	(substituted on) 71'
Coach:
(New Zealand) Kieran Crowley

FB	15	Metuisela Talebula
RW	14	Waisea Nayacalevu
OC	13	Vereniki Goneva		(substituted off) 75'
IC	12	Gabiriele Lovobalavu
LW	11	Nemani Nadolo
FH	10	Josh Matavesi		(substituted off) 61'
SH	9	Nikola Matawalu		(substituted off) 40'
N8	8	Sakiusa Matadigo		(substituted off) 42'
OF	7	Akapusi Qera (c)
BF	6	Dominiko Waqaniburotu
RL	5	Leone Nakarawa
LL	4	Api Ratuniyarawa		(substituted off) 55'
TP	3	Manasa Saulo		(substituted off) 71'
HK	2	Sunia Koto		(substituted off) 60'
LP	1	Campese Ma'afu		(substituted off) 52'
Replacements:
HK	16	Viliame Veikoso		(substituted on) 60'
PR	17	Peni Ravai		(substituted on) 52'
PR	18	Lee-roy Atalifo		(substituted on) 71'
LK	19	Tevita Cavubati		(substituted on) 55'
N8	20	Netani Talei	(yellow card) 71'	(substituted on) 42'
SH	21	Nemia Kenatale		(substituted on) 40'
FH	22	Asaeli Tikoirotuma		(substituted on) 61'
FB	23	Kini Murimurivalu		(substituted on) 75'
Coach:
(New Zealand) John McKee

Touch judges:
Ian Davies (Wales)
Vlad Iordachescu (Romania)

6 September 2015
17:00 CEST (UTC+02)

Basque Country	19–41	Uruguay
	Report

Campos Deportivos de Fadura, Getxo

Team details

FB	15	Jon Iturriria
RW	14	Ander Ayala
OC	13	Vincent Bordagaray
IC	12	Beñat Goicoetxea
LW	11	Clement Sallaber
FH	10	Igor Genua
SH	9	Pablo Feijóo
N8	8	Jon Magunazelaia
OF	7	Juanicotena
BF	6	Clement Pinon (c)
RL	5	Julen Zamakola
LL	4	Damien Elgoyhen
TP	3	Sebastien Guillemin
HK	2	David Pérez
LP	1	Ekaitz Sadaba
Replacements:
PR	16	Christophe Gaye
HK	17	Facundo Orive
PR	18	Iker Lavín
LK	19	Gastón Ibarburu
FL	20	William Broca
SH	21	Mikel Ezeiza
WG	22	Mathieu Betache
WG	23	Axier Álvarez de Eulate
Coach:
(France) Jean Pierre Elissalde

FB	15	Jerónimo Etcheverry
RW	14	Francisco Bulanti
OC	13	Joaquín Prada
IC	12	Alberto Román
LW	11	Rodrigo Silva
FH	10	Manuel Blengio
SH	9	Alejo Durán
N8	8	Agustín Alonso
OF	7	Fernando Bascou
BF	6	Juan de Freitas
RL	5	Mathias Palomeque
LL	4	Franco Lamanna
TP	3	Oscar Durán (c)
HK	2	Germán Kessler
LP	1	Mateo Sanguinetti
Replacements:
HK	16	Carlos Arboleya
PR	17	Mario Sagario
PR	18	Alejo Corral
LK	19	Jorge Zerbino
FL	20	Diego Magno
FL	21	Matías Beer
SH	22	Andrés Vilaseca
WG	23	Santiago Gibernau
Coach:
(Uruguay) Pablo Lemoine

== See also ==
- 2015 World Rugby Pacific Nations Cup
- 2015 Rugby Championship
