= 2015 Rugby World Cup Pool A =

Pool A of the 2015 Rugby World Cup began on 18 September 2015 and was completed on 10 October 2015. The pool was composed of hosts England, as well as the third- and fourth-placed teams from 2011, Australia and Wales. They were joined by the Oceania qualifier, Fiji, and the repechage qualifier, Uruguay. The group was called the group of death, with four of the five teams in the top 10 of the World Rugby Rankings going into the tournament. Australia and Wales qualified for the quarter-finals.

== Standings ==
Pos	Team	Pld	W	D	L	PF	PA	PD	T	B	Pts	Qualification
1	Australia	4	4	0	0	141	35	+106	17	1	17	Advanced to the quarter-finals and qualified for the 2019 Rugby World Cup
2	Wales	4	3	0	1	111	62	+49	11	1	13	Advanced to the quarter-finals and qualified for the 2019 Rugby World Cup
3	England	4	2	0	2	133	75	+58	16	3	11	Eliminated but qualified for 2019 Rugby World Cup
4	Fiji	4	1	0	3	84	101	−17	10	1	5	
5	Uruguay	4	0	0	4	30	226	−196	2	0	0	

== Matches ==
All times are local United Kingdom time (UTC+01)

=== England vs Fiji ===
18 September 2015
20:00

England	35–11	Fiji
Try: Penalty try 13' c Brown (2) 22' m, 72' c B. Vunipola 80' c Con: Ford (1/2) 13'; Farrell (2/2) 73', 80'; Pen: Ford (2/3) 3', 34'; Farrell (1/1) 68'	Report	Try: Nadolo 30' m Pen: Nadolo (1/3) 37'; Volavola (1/2) 64'

Twickenham Stadium, London
Attendance: 80,015
Referee: Jaco Peyper (South Africa)

England	Fiji

FB	15	Mike Brown
RW	14	Anthony Watson
OC	13	Jonathan Joseph
IC	12	Brad Barritt	(substituted off) 62'
LW	11	Jonny May
FH	10	George Ford	(substituted off) 62'
SH	9	Ben Youngs	(substituted off) 52'
N8	8	Ben Morgan	(substituted off) 52'
OF	7	Chris Robshaw (c)
BF	6	Tom Wood
RL	5	Courtney Lawes
LL	4	Geoff Parling	(substituted off) 52'
TP	3	Dan Cole	(substituted off) 68'
HK	2	Tom Youngs	(substituted off) 73'
LP	1	Joe Marler	(substituted off) 52'
Replacements:
HK	16	Rob Webber	(substituted in) 73'
PR	17	Mako Vunipola	(substituted in) 52'
PR	18	Kieran Brookes	(substituted in) 68'
LK	19	Joe Launchbury	(substituted in) 52'
N8	20	Billy Vunipola	(substituted in) 52'
SH	21	Richard Wigglesworth	(substituted in) 52'
FH	22	Owen Farrell	(substituted in) 62'
CE	23	Sam Burgess	(substituted in) 62'
Coach:
(England) Stuart Lancaster

FB	15	Metuisela Talebula
RW	14	Waisea Nayacalevu
OC	13	Vereniki Goneva
IC	12	Gabiriele Lovobalavu
LW	11	Nemani Nadolo
FH	10	Ben Volavola
SH	9	Nikola Matawalu	(yellow card) 13'
N8	8	Sakiusa Matadigo
OF	7	Akapusi Qera (c)
BF	6	Dominiko Waqaniburotu		(substituted off) 60'
RL	5	Leone Nakarawa
LL	4	Api Ratuniyarawa		(substituted off) 41'
TP	3	Manasa Saulo		(substituted off) 76'
HK	2	Sunia Koto		(substituted off) 74'
LP	1	Campese Ma'afu		(substituted off) 74'
Replacements:
HK	16	Tuapati Talemaitoga		(substituted in) 74'
PR	17	Peni Ravai		(substituted in) 74'
PR	18	Isei Colati		(substituted in) 76'
LK	19	Tevita Cavubati		(substituted in) 41'
FL	20	Peceli Yato		(substituted in) 60'
SH	21	Nemia Kenatale
FH	22	Josh Matavesi
WG	23	Asaeli Tikoirotuma
Coach:
(New Zealand) John McKee

Man of the Match:
Mike Brown (England)

Touch judges:
John Lacey (Ireland)
Stuart Berry (South Africa)
Television match official:
Shaun Veldsman (South Africa)

Notes:

- Ben Youngs earned his 50th test cap for England.

=== Wales vs Uruguay ===
20 September 2015
14:30

Wales	54–9	Uruguay
Try: Lee 15' c Allen (3) 19' c, 30' c, 40' c Amos 50' c G. Davies (2) 60' m, 80' c Tipuric 71' c Con: Priestland (7/8) 16', 19', 30', 40', 51', 72', 80'	Report	Pen: Berchesi (3/4) 2', 9', 24'

Millennium Stadium, Cardiff
Attendance: 71,887
Referee: Romain Poite (France)

Wales	Uruguay

FB	15	Liam Williams	(substituted off) 36'
RW	14	Alex Cuthbert
OC	13	Cory Allen	(substituted off) 55'
IC	12	Scott Williams
LW	11	Hallam Amos
FH	10	Rhys Priestland
SH	9	Gareth Davies
N8	8	James King	(substituted off) 47'	(substituted in) 75'
OF	7	Justin Tipuric
BF	6	Sam Warburton (c)	(substituted off) 59'
RL	5	Luke Charteris	(substituted off) 47'
LL	4	Jake Ball
TP	3	Samson Lee	(substituted off) 40'
HK	2	Scott Baldwin	(substituted off) 63'
LP	1	Paul James	(substituted off) 32'
Replacements:
HK	16	Ken Owens	(substituted in) 63'
PR	17	Aaron Jarvis	(substituted in) 32'
PR	18	Tomas Francis	(substituted in) 40'
LK	19	Dominic Day	(substituted in) 47'
FL	20	Dan Lydiate	(substituted in) 59'	(substituted off) 75'
FL	21	Ross Moriarty	(substituted in) 47'
SH	22	Lloyd Williams	(substituted in) 55'
FB	23	Matthew Morgan	(substituted in) 36'
Coach:
(New Zealand) Warren Gatland

FB	15	Gastón Mieres
RW	14	Santiago Gibernau
OC	13	Joaquín Prada
IC	12	Andrés Vilaseca	(substituted off) 75'
LW	11	Rodrigo Silva
FH	10	Felipe Berchesi
SH	9	Agustín Ormaechea	(substituted off) 75'
N8	8	Alejandro Nieto
OF	7	Matías Beer	(substituted off) 59'
BF	6	Juan Manuel Gaminara
RL	5	Jorge Zerbino	(substituted off) 62'
LL	4	Santiago Vilaseca (c)	(substituted off) 75'
TP	3	Mario Sagario	(substituted off) 72'
HK	2	Carlos Arboleya	(substituted off) 78'
LP	1	Alejo Corral	(substituted off) 78'
Replacements:
HK	16	Germán Kessler	(substituted in) 78'
PR	17	Oscar Durán	(substituted in) 72'
PR	18	Mateo Sanguinetti	(substituted in) 78'
LK	19	Franco Lamanna	(substituted in) 62'
FL	20	Agustín Alonso	(substituted in) 75'
FL	21	Juan de Freitas	(substituted in) 59'
SH	22	Alejo Durán	(substituted in) 75'
WG	23	Francisco Bulanti	(substituted in) 75'
Coach:
(Uruguay) Pablo Lemoine

Man of the Match:
Cory Allen (Wales)

Touch judges:
Pascal Gaüzère (France)
Mathieu Raynal (France)
Television match official:
Ben Skeen (New Zealand)

Notes

- This was the first ever match between these nations.

=== Australia vs Fiji ===
23 September 2015
16:45

Australia	28–13	Fiji
Try: Pocock (2) 26' c, 31' m Kepu 43' c Con: Foley (2/3) 28', 44'; Pen: Foley (3/3) 10', 38', 70'	Report	Try: Volavola 60' c Con: Nadolo (1/1) 61'; Pen: Nadolo (2/2) 21', 47'

Millennium Stadium, Cardiff
Attendance: 67,253
Referee: Glen Jackson (New Zealand)

Australia	Fiji

FB	15	Israel Folau
RW	14	Adam Ashley-Cooper
OC	13	Tevita Kuridrani	(yellow card) 74'
IC	12	Matt Giteau		(substituted off) 72'
LW	11	Rob Horne
FH	10	Bernard Foley		(substituted off) 78'
SH	9	Will Genia		(substituted off) 67'
N8	8	David Pocock
OF	7	Michael Hooper
BF	6	Scott Fardy
RL	5	Rob Simmons		(substituted off) 62'
LL	4	Kane Douglas		(substituted off) 70'
TP	3	Sekope Kepu		(substituted off) 56'
HK	2	Stephen Moore (c)		(substituted off) 67'
LP	1	Scott Sio		(substituted off) 56'	(substituted in) 67'
Replacements:
HK	16	Tatafu Polota-Nau		(substituted in) 67'
PR	17	James Slipper		(substituted in) 56'	(substituted off) 67'
PR	18	Greg Holmes		(substituted in) 56'
LK	19	Will Skelton		(substituted in) 70'
LK	20	Dean Mumm		(substituted in) 62'
SH	21	Nick Phipps		(substituted in) 67'
CE	22	Matt To'omua		(substituted in) 78'
CE	23	Kurtley Beale		(substituted in) 72'
Coach:
(Australia) Michael Cheika

FB	15	Metuisela Talebula
RW	14	Waisea Nayacalevu		(substituted off) 5'
OC	13	Vereniki Goneva
IC	12	Gabiriele Lovobalavu
LW	11	Nemani Nadolo
FH	10	Ben Volavola
SH	9	Nikola Matawalu		(substituted off) 50'
N8	8	Netani Talei		(substituted off) 67'
OF	7	Akapusi Qera (c)
BF	6	Peceli Yato		(substituted off) 35'	(substituted in) 40'
RL	5	Leone Nakarawa
LL	4	Tevita Cavubati		(substituted off) 62'
TP	3	Manasa Saulo		(substituted off) 78'
HK	2	Talemaitoga Tuapati
LP	1	Campese Ma'afu	(yellow card) 30'
Replacements:
HK	16	Viliame Veikoso
PR	17	Peni Ravai		(substituted in) 35'	(substituted off) 40'
PR	18	Isei Colati		(substituted in) 78'
LK	19	Nemia Soqeta		(substituted in) 62'
FL	20	Malakai Ravulo		(substituted in) 67'
SH	21	Nemia Kenatale		(substituted in) 50'
FH	22	Josh Matavesi
WG	23	Asaeli Tikoirotuma		(substituted in) 5'
Coach:
(New Zealand) John McKee

Man of the Match:
David Pocock (Australia)

Touch judges:
Nigel Owens (Wales)
Leighton Hodges (Wales)
Television match official:
Graham Hughes (England)

=== England vs Wales ===
26 September 2015
20:00

England	25–28	Wales
Try: May 27' c Con: Farrell (1/1) 29'; Pen: Farrell (5/5) 12', 24', 44', 52', 69'; Drop: Farrell 18'	Report	Try: G. Davies 71' c Con: Biggar (1/1) 72'; Pen: Biggar (7/7) 3', 16', 40', 48', 54', 59', 75'

Twickenham Stadium, London
Attendance: 81,129
Referee: Jérôme Garcès (France)

England	Wales

FB	15	Mike Brown
RW	14	Anthony Watson
OC	13	Brad Barritt
IC	12	Sam Burgess	(substituted off) 70'
LW	11	Jonny May
FH	10	Owen Farrell
SH	9	Ben Youngs	(substituted off) 49'
N8	8	Billy Vunipola	(substituted off) 63'
OF	7	Chris Robshaw (c)
BF	6	Tom Wood
RL	5	Courtney Lawes	(substituted off) 40'
LL	4	Geoff Parling
TP	3	Dan Cole	(substituted off) 72'
HK	2	Tom Youngs	(substituted off) 67'
LP	1	Joe Marler	(substituted off) 61'
Replacements:
HK	16	Rob Webber	(substituted in) 67'
PR	17	Mako Vunipola	(substituted in) 63'
PR	18	Kieran Brookes	(substituted in) 72'
LK	19	Joe Launchbury	(substituted in) 40'
FL	20	James Haskell	(substituted in) 63'
SH	21	Richard Wigglesworth	(substituted in) 49'
FH	22	George Ford	(substituted in) 70'
FB	23	Alex Goode
Coach:
(England) Stuart Lancaster

FB	15	Liam Williams	(substituted off) 67'
RW	14	George North
OC	13	Scott Williams	(substituted off) 63'
IC	12	Jamie Roberts
LW	11	Hallam Amos	(substituted off) 67'
FH	10	Dan Biggar
SH	9	Gareth Davies
N8	8	Taulupe Faletau
OF	7	Sam Warburton (c)
BF	6	Dan Lydiate	(substituted off) 70'
RL	5	Alun Wyn Jones
LL	4	Bradley Davies	(substituted off) 70'
TP	3	Tomas Francis	(substituted off) 49'
HK	2	Scott Baldwin	(substituted off) 49'
LP	1	Gethin Jenkins
Replacements:
HK	16	Ken Owens	(substituted in) 49'
PR	17	Aaron Jarvis
PR	18	Samson Lee	(substituted in) 49'
LK	19	Luke Charteris	(substituted in) 70'
FL	20	Justin Tipuric	(substituted in) 70'
SH	21	Lloyd Williams	(substituted in) 67'
FH	22	Rhys Priestland	(substituted in) 67'
WG	23	Alex Cuthbert	(substituted in) 63'
Coach:
(New Zealand) Warren Gatland

Man of the Match:
Dan Biggar (Wales)

Touch judges:
Romain Poite (France)
Mathieu Raynal (France)
Television match official:
Shaun Veldsman (South Africa)

Notes:

- This was the first time the host nation had lost a match in the pool stage since France lost to Argentina 17–12 in 2007.

=== Australia vs Uruguay ===
27 September 2015
12:00

Australia	65–3	Uruguay
Try: McMahon (2) 7' m, 69' m Tomane 9' c Mumm 26' m Speight 31' c McCalman (2) 36' c, 61' c Mitchell (2) 47' m, 52' m To'omua 71' m Kuridrani 80' c Con: Cooper (5/11) 10', 32', 36', 62', 80'	Report	Pen: Berchesi (1/1) 24'

Villa Park, Birmingham
Attendance: 39,605
Referee: Pascal Gaüzère (France)

Australia	Uruguay

FB	15	Kurtley Beale
RW	14	Joe Tomane
OC	13	Henry Speight
IC	12	Matt To'omua		(substituted off) 78'
LW	11	Drew Mitchell
FH	10	Quade Cooper	(yellow card) 15'
SH	9	Nick Phipps
N8	8	Wycliff Palu		(substituted off) 40'
OF	7	Sean McMahon
BF	6	Ben McCalman
RL	5	Will Skelton		(substituted off) 57'
LL	4	Dean Mumm (c)
TP	3	Toby Smith
HK	2	Tatafu Polota-Nau
LP	1	Scott Sio		(substituted off) 49'
Replacements:
HK	16	Stephen Moore
PR	17	Sekope Kepu		(substituted in) 49'
PR	18	Greg Holmes
LK	19	Kane Douglas		(substituted in) 57'
LK	20	Rob Simmons		(substituted in) 40'
SH	21	Will Genia
FH	22	Bernard Foley
CE	23	Tevita Kuridrani		(substituted in) 78'
Coach:
(Australia) Michael Cheika

FB	15	Gastón Mieres
RW	14	Leandro Leivas
OC	13	Joaquín Prada
IC	12	Andrés Vilaseca	(substituted off) 70'
LW	11	Rodrigo Silva
FH	10	Felipe Berchesi	(substituted off) 70'
SH	9	Agustín Ormaechea
N8	8	Juan Manuel Gaminara	(substituted off) 70'
OF	7	Matías Beer
BF	6	Juan de Freitas	(substituted off) 55'
RL	5	Franco Lamanna	(substituted off) 55'
LL	4	Santiago Vilaseca (c)
TP	3	Mario Sagario	(substituted off) 53'
HK	2	Germán Kessler	(substituted off) 41'
LP	1	Mateo Sanguinetti	(substituted off) 53'
Replacements:
HK	16	Nicolás Klappenbach	(substituted in) 53'
PR	17	Oscar Durán	(substituted in) 53'
PR	18	Carlos Arboleya	(substituted in) 41'
N8	19	Alejandro Nieto	(substituted in) 55'
FL	20	Diego Magno	(substituted in) 55'
FL	21	Fernando Bascou	(substituted in) 70'
SH	22	Alejo Durán	(substituted in) 70'
CE	23	Alberto Román	(substituted in) 70'
Coach:
(Uruguay) Pablo Lemoine

Man of the Match:
Sean McMahon (Australia)

Touch judges:
Jaco Peyper (South Africa)
Marius Mitrea (Italy)
Television match official:
Graham Hughes (England)

Notes:

- This was the first meeting between the two nations.
- Diego Magno earned his 50th test cap for Uruguay.
- Drew Mitchell scored his 12th World Cup try, surpassing Chris Latham's Australian World Cup record of 11 tries.

=== Wales vs Fiji ===
1 October 2015
16:45

Wales	23–13	Fiji
Try: G. Davies 7' c Baldwin 32' c Con: Biggar (2/2) 8', 34'; Pen: Biggar (3/3) 21', 55', 69'	Report	Try: Goneva 49' c Con: Volavola (1/1) 50'; Pen: Volavola (2/2) 14', 38'

Millennium Stadium, Cardiff
Attendance: 71,576
Referee: John Lacey (Ireland)

Wales	Fiji

FB	15	Matthew Morgan	(substituted off) 71'
RW	14	Alex Cuthbert	20' to 27'
OC	13	Tyler Morgan
IC	12	Jamie Roberts
LW	11	George North
FH	10	Dan Biggar	(substituted off) 73'
SH	9	Gareth Davies
N8	8	Taulupe Faletau
OF	7	Sam Warburton (c)
BF	6	Dan Lydiate	(substituted off) 69'
RL	5	Alun Wyn Jones
LL	4	Bradley Davies	14' to 27'		(substituted off) 64'
TP	3	Tomas Francis	(substituted off) 50'
HK	2	Scott Baldwin	(substituted off) 55'
LP	1	Gethin Jenkins	(substituted off) 67'
Replacements:
HK	16	Ken Owens	(substituted in) 55'
PR	17	Aaron Jarvis	(substituted in) 67'
PR	18	Samson Lee	(substituted in) 50'
LK	19	Luke Charteris	(substituted in) 14'	(substituted off) 27'	(substituted in) 64'
FL	20	Justin Tipuric	(substituted in) 69'
SH	21	Lloyd Williams	(substituted in) 20'	(substituted off) 27'
FH	22	Rhys Priestland	(substituted in) 73'
CE	23	James Hook	(substituted in) 71'
Coach:
(New Zealand) Warren Gatland

FB	15	Metuisela Talebula
RW	14	Timoci Nagusa
OC	13	Vereniki Goneva	(substituted off) 71'
IC	12	Levani Botia	(substituted off) 75'
LW	11	Asaeli Tikoirotuma
FH	10	Ben Volavola
SH	9	Nemia Kenatale	(substituted off) 71'
N8	8	Netani Talei
OF	7	Akapusi Qera (c)
BF	6	Dominiko Waqaniburotu	(substituted off) 69'
RL	5	Leone Nakarawa
LL	4	Tevita Cavubati	(substituted off) 69'
TP	3	Manasa Saulo	(substituted off) 77'
HK	2	Sunia Koto	(substituted off) 75'
LP	1	Campese Ma'afu	(substituted off) 77'
Replacements:
HK	16	Viliame Veikoso	(substituted in) 75'
PR	17	Peni Ravai	(substituted in) 77'
PR	18	Lee Roy Atalifo	(substituted in) 77'
LK	19	Nemia Soqeta	(substituted in) 69'
FL	20	Malakai Ravulo	(substituted in) 69'
SH	21	Henry Seniloli	(substituted in) 71'
FH	22	Josh Matavesi	(substituted in) 71'
FB	23	Kini Murimurivalu	(substituted in) 75'
Coach:
(New Zealand) John McKee

Man of the Match:
Gareth Davies (Wales)

Touch judges:
Jérôme Garcès (France)
Mathieu Raynal (France)
Television match official:
George Ayoub (Australia)

Notes:

- Taulupe Faletau and Dan Lydiate earned their 50th test cap for Wales.
- Akapusi Qera earned his 50th test cap for Fiji.

=== England vs Australia ===
3 October 2015
20:00

England	13–33	Australia
Try: Watson 56' c Con: Farrell (1/1) 57'; Pen: Farrell (2/2) 13', 65'	Report	Try: Foley (2) 20' c, 35' c Giteau 80' c Con: Foley (3/3) 22', 36', 80'; Pen: Foley (4/4) 8', 50', 72', 76'

Twickenham Stadium, London
Attendance: 81,010
Referee: Romain Poite (France)

England	Australia

FB	15	Mike Brown
RW	14	Anthony Watson
OC	13	Jonathan Joseph
IC	12	Brad Barritt		(substituted off) 65'
LW	11	Jonny May		(substituted off) 40'
FH	10	Owen Farrell	(yellow card) 71'
SH	9	Ben Youngs		(substituted off) 50'
N8	8	Ben Morgan		(substituted off) 58'
OF	7	Chris Robshaw (c)
BF	6	Tom Wood
RL	5	Geoff Parling
LL	4	Joe Launchbury		(substituted off) 69'
TP	3	Dan Cole		(substituted off) 54'
HK	2	Tom Youngs		(substituted off) 61'
LP	1	Joe Marler		(substituted off) 50'
Replacements:
HK	16	Rob Webber		(substituted in) 61'
PR	17	Mako Vunipola		(substituted in) 50'
PR	18	Kieran Brookes		(substituted in) 54'
LK	19	George Kruis		(substituted in) 69'
N8	20	Nick Easter		(substituted in) 58'
SH	21	Richard Wigglesworth		(substituted in) 50'
FH	22	George Ford		(substituted in) 40'
CE	23	Sam Burgess		(substituted in) 65'
Coach:
(England) Stuart Lancaster

FB	15	Israel Folau	(substituted off) 65'
RW	14	Adam Ashley-Cooper
OC	13	Tevita Kuridrani
IC	12	Matt Giteau
LW	11	Rob Horne	(substituted off) 11'
FH	10	Bernard Foley
SH	9	Will Genia	(substituted off) 61'
N8	8	David Pocock
OF	7	Michael Hooper
BF	6	Scott Fardy	(substituted off) 76'
RL	5	Rob Simmons	(substituted off) 65'
LL	4	Kane Douglas
TP	3	Sekope Kepu	(substituted off) 57'
HK	2	Stephen Moore (c)	(substituted off) 65'
LP	1	Scott Sio	(substituted off) 57'
Replacements:
HK	16	Tatafu Polota-Nau	(substituted in) 65'
PR	17	James Slipper	(substituted in) 57'
PR	18	Greg Holmes	(substituted in) 57'
LK	19	Dean Mumm	(substituted in) 65'
N8	20	Ben McCalman	(substituted in) 76'
SH	21	Nick Phipps	(substituted in) 61'
CE	22	Matt To'omua	(substituted in) 65'
CE	23	Kurtley Beale	(substituted in) 11'
Coach:
(Australia) Michael Cheika

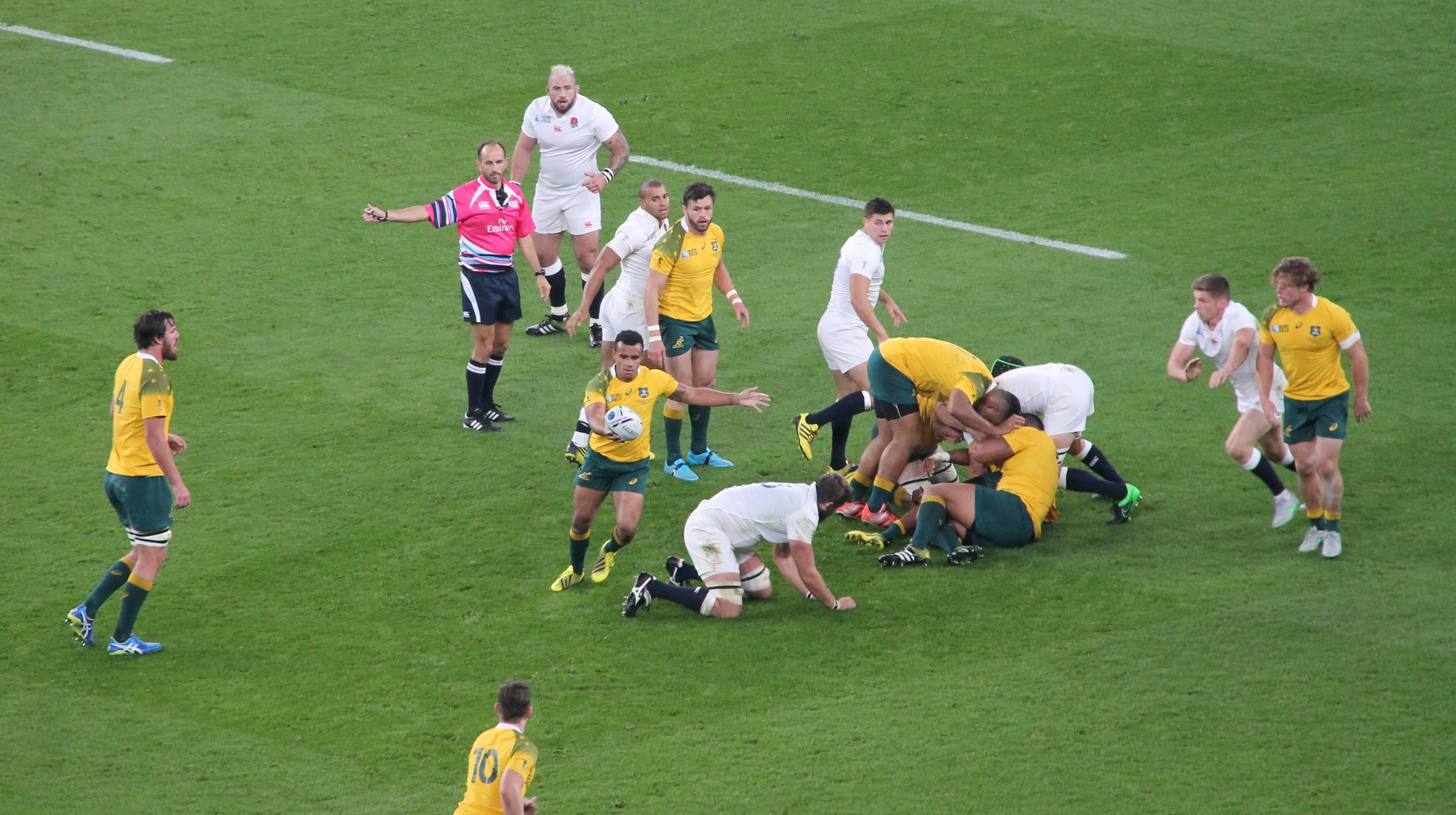

Man of the Match:
Joe Launchbury (England)

Touch judges:
George Clancy (Ireland)
Marius Mitrea (Italy)
Television match official:
Shaun Veldsman (South Africa)

Notes:

- With this loss, England became the first host nation since Wales in 1991 not to make it out of the Pools.
- This was Australia's largest winning margin over England in England, while scoring the most points against them in England.

=== Fiji vs Uruguay ===
6 October 2015
20:00

Fiji	47–15	Uruguay
Try: Penalty try (2) 3' c, 27' c Kenatale 8' m Nakarawa 38' c Cavubati 64' c Murimurivalu 66' c Nadolo 79' c Con: Nadolo (6/7) 3', 28', 39', 65', 66', 80	Report	Try: Arboleya 17' c Ormaechea 58' m Con: Ormaechea (1/2) 18'; Pen: Durán (1/1) 15'

Stadium mk, Milton Keynes
Attendance: 30,048
Referee: JP Doyle (England)

Fiji	Uruguay

FB	15	Kini Murimurivalu
RW	14	Asaeli Tikoirotuma
OC	13	Vereniki Goneva		(substituted off) 65'
IC	12	Levani Botia
LW	11	Nemani Nadolo
FH	10	Ben Volavola		(substituted off) 69'
SH	9	Nemia Kenatale		(substituted off) 61'
N8	8	Sakiusa Matadigo		(substituted off) 56'
OF	7	Akapusi Qera (c)
BF	6	Dominiko Waqaniburotu		(substituted off) 67'	(substituted in) 78'
RL	5	Leone Nakarawa
LL	4	Api Ratuniyarawa		(substituted off) 56'
TP	3	Lee Roy Atalifo		(substituted off) 75'
HK	2	Sunia Koto		(substituted off) 75'
LP	1	Campese Ma'afu	(yellow card) 66'		(substituted off) 78'
Replacements:
HK	16	Viliame Veikoso		(substituted in) 75'
PR	17	Peni Ravai		(substituted in) 67'
PR	18	Taniela Koroi		(substituted in) 75'
LK	19	Tevita Cavubati		(substituted in) 56'
N8	20	Netani Talei		(substituted in) 56'
SH	21	Henry Seniloli		(substituted in) 61'
FH	22	Josh Matavesi		(substituted in) 69'
WG	23	Timoci Nagusa		(substituted in) 65'
Coach:
(New Zealand) John McKee

FB	15	Gastón Mieres
RW	14	Santiago Gibernau		(substituted off) 75'
OC	13	Joaquín Prada
IC	12	Andrés Vilaseca
LW	11	Rodrigo Silva
FH	10	Alejo Durán		(substituted off) 65'
SH	9	Agustín Ormaechea	(yellow card) 3' (red card) 66'
N8	8	Diego Magno
OF	7	Matías Beer		(substituted off) 70'
BF	6	Juan Manuel Gaminara		(substituted off) 75'
RL	5	Jorge Zerbino		(substituted off) 65'
LL	4	Santiago Vilaseca (c)
TP	3	Mario Sagario		(substituted off) 65'
HK	2	Carlos Arboleya
LP	1	Alejo Corral		(substituted off) 40'
Replacements:
HK	16	Germán Kessler
PR	17	Oscar Durán		(substituted in) 65'
PR	18	Mateo Sanguinetti		(substituted in) 40'
LK	19	Mathias Palomeque		(substituted in) 65'
LK	20	Franco Lamanna		(substituted in) 70'
FL	21	Juan de Freitas		(substituted in) 75'
WG	22	Jerónimo Etcheverry		(substituted in) 65'
WG	23	Francisco Bulanti		(substituted in) 75'
Coach:
(Uruguay) Pablo Lemoine

Man of the Match:
Leone Nakarawa (Fiji)

Touch judges:
Jaco Peyper (South Africa)
Leighton Hodges (Wales)
Television match official:
Graham Hughes (England)

Notes:

- Mario Sagario earned his 50th test cap for Uruguay.

=== Australia vs Wales ===
10 October 2015
16:45

Australia	15–6	Wales
Pen: Foley (5/6) 25', 31', 37', 51', 73'	Report	Pen: Biggar (2/3) 5', 34'

Twickenham Stadium, London
Attendance: 80,863
Referee: Craig Joubert (South Africa)

Australia	Wales

FB	15	Israel Folau
RW	14	Adam Ashley-Cooper
OC	13	Tevita Kuridrani
IC	12	Matt Giteau		(substituted off) 67'
LW	11	Drew Mitchell		(substituted off) 67'
FH	10	Bernard Foley
SH	9	Will Genia	(yellow card) 57'	(substituted off) 68'
N8	8	David Pocock		(substituted off) 60'
OF	7	Sean McMahon		(substituted off) 49'
BF	6	Scott Fardy
RL	5	Dean Mumm	(yellow card) 60'
LL	4	Kane Douglas
TP	3	Sekope Kepu		(substituted off) 56'
HK	2	Stephen Moore (c)		(substituted off) 67'
LP	1	Scott Sio		(substituted off) 63'
Replacements:
HK	16	Tatafu Polota-Nau		(substituted in) 67'
PR	17	James Slipper		(substituted in) 63'
PR	18	Greg Holmes		(substituted in) 56'
LK	19	Rob Simmons		(substituted in) 60'
N8	20	Ben McCalman		(substituted in) 49'
SH	21	Nick Phipps		(substituted in) 68'
CE	22	Matt To'omua		(substituted in) 67'
CE	23	Kurtley Beale		(substituted in) 67'
Coach:
(Australia) Michael Cheika

FB	15	Gareth Anscombe
RW	14	Alex Cuthbert	(yellow card) 77'
OC	13	George North
IC	12	Jamie Roberts		(substituted off) 79'
LW	11	Liam Williams		(substituted off) 74'
FH	10	Dan Biggar		(substituted off) 74'
SH	9	Gareth Davies
N8	8	Taulupe Faletau
OF	7	Justin Tipuric		(substituted off) 73'
BF	6	Sam Warburton (c)
RL	5	Alun Wyn Jones
LL	4	Luke Charteris
TP	3	Samson Lee		(substituted off) 54'
HK	2	Scott Baldwin		(substituted off) 73'
LP	1	Paul James		(substituted off) 73'
Replacements:
HK	16	Ken Owens		(substituted in) 73'
PR	17	Aaron Jarvis		(substituted in) 73'
PR	18	Tomas Francis		(substituted in) 54'
LK	19	Jake Ball
FL	20	Ross Moriarty		(substituted in) 73'
SH	21	Lloyd Williams		(substituted in) 79'
FH	22	Rhys Priestland		(substituted in) 74'
CE	23	James Hook		(substituted in) 74'
Coach:
(New Zealand) Warren Gatland

Man of the Match:
Gareth Davies (Wales)

Touch judges:
Jérôme Garcès (France)
Stuart Berry (South Africa)
Television match official:
Shaun Veldsman (South Africa)

Notes:

- This was the first match between Australia and Wales in which both sides have failed to score a try since Wales' 6–0 win in 1947.

=== England vs Uruguay ===
10 October 2015
20:00

England	60–3	Uruguay
Try: Watson (2) 7' c, 42' m Easter (3) 18' c, 23' c, 60' m Slade 54' m Nowell (3) 57' c, 70' m, 74' m Penalty try 80' c Con: Farrell (4/6) 8', 19', 25', 58'; Ford (1/4) 80'	Report	Pen: Berchesi (1/1) 2'

City of Manchester Stadium, Manchester
Attendance: 50,778
Referee: Chris Pollock (New Zealand)

England	Uruguay

FB	15	Alex Goode
RW	14	Anthony Watson	(substituted off) 67'
OC	13	Henry Slade
IC	12	Owen Farrell	(substituted off) 59'
LW	11	Jack Nowell
FH	10	George Ford
SH	9	Danny Care	(substituted off) 71'
N8	8	Nick Easter
OF	7	Chris Robshaw (c)
BF	6	James Haskell	(substituted off) 61'
RL	5	Geoff Parling	(substituted off) 56'
LL	4	Joe Launchbury
TP	3	Dan Cole	(substituted off) 43'
HK	2	Tom Youngs	(substituted off) 30'
LP	1	Mako Vunipola	(substituted off) 71'
Replacements:
HK	16	Jamie George	(substituted in) 30'
PR	17	Joe Marler	(substituted in) 71'
PR	18	David Wilson	(substituted in) 43'
LK	19	George Kruis	(substituted in) 56'
FL	20	Tom Wood	(substituted in) 61'
SH	21	Richard Wigglesworth	(substituted in) 71'
CE	22	Jonathan Joseph	(substituted in) 59'
FB	23	Mike Brown	(substituted in) 67'
Coach:
(England) Stuart Lancaster

FB	15	Gastón Mieres
RW	14	Santiago Gibernau
OC	13	Joaquín Prada
IC	12	Andrés Vilaseca
LW	11	Rodrigo Silva
FH	10	Felipe Berchesi		(substituted off) 74'
SH	9	Agustín Ormaechea		(substituted off) 74'
N8	8	Alejandro Nieto		(substituted off) 69'
OF	7	Matías Beer		(substituted off) 69'
BF	6	Juan Manuel Gaminara
RL	5	Jorge Zerbino		(substituted off) 63'
LL	4	Santiago Vilaseca (c)	(yellow card) 40+2'
TP	3	Mario Sagario		(substituted off) 63'
HK	2	Carlos Arboleya		(substituted off) 71'
LP	1	Mateo Sanguinetti		(substituted off) 63'
Replacements:
HK	16	Nicolás Klappenbach		(substituted in) 63'
PR	17	Oscar Durán		(substituted in) 71'
PR	18	Alejo Corral		(substituted in) 63'
LK	19	Mathias Palomeque		(substituted in) 63'
FL	20	Diego Magno		(substituted in) 69'
FL	21	Agustín Alonso		(substituted in) 69'
SH	22	Alejo Durán		(substituted in) 74'
FH	23	Manuel Blengio		(substituted in) 74'
Coach:
(Uruguay) Pablo Lemoine

Man of the Match:
Nick Easter (England)

Touch judges:
Angus Gardner (Australia)
Federico Anselmi (Argentina)
Television match official:
George Ayoub (Australia)

Notes:

- Alejo Corral earned his 50th test cap for Uruguay.
- Nick Easter became the oldest player ever to score an international hat-trick.
