= Giorgi Pruidze =

Georgia international rugby union player

- Born: 2 June 1994 (age 32) Tsqaltubo, Georgia
- Height: 1.91 m (6 ft 3 in)
- Weight: 95 kg (14 st 13 lb)

Rugby union career
- Position(s): Wing, Centre
Senior career
Years	Team	Apps	(Points)
2014-2017	AIA Kutaisi	32	(25)
2017-	Krasny Yar	12	(20)
- Correct as of 26 September 2015
International career
Years	Team	Apps	(Points)
2015–	Georgia	15	(15)
- Correct as of 19 April 2018

Giorgi Pruidze (born June 2, 1994) is a Georgian rugby union player. His position is wing, and he plays for AIA Kutaisi in the Georgia Championship and the Georgia national team.

Pruidze played for Georgia in the warm-up matches for the 2015 Rugby World Cup, including Georgia's match against Canada. Pruidze was named to Georgia's squad for the 2015 Rugby World Cup, where he played in Georgia's match against Argentina.

Pruidze also played in Georgia's 59–7 win against Germany in February 2016, a match where Pruidze achieved a small amount of notoriety for a misjudged chip that granted underdogs Germany a surprising early lead. Pruidze scored a try in Georgia's 38–9 rout against Romania in March 2016 in front of more than 50,000 fans in Tbilisi. Pruidze was again named to Georgia's squad for the June 2016 tests, where he was named to Georgia's matchday squad against Fiji.
