= Patricio Baronio =

Argentine rugby union player

- Born: Patricio Baronio Gauna; 5 June 1996 (age 30) Rosario, Argentina
- Height: 1.78 m (5 ft 10 in)
- Weight: 82 kg (12.9 st; 181 lb)
- Notable relative: Juan Baronio (brother)

Rugby union career
- Position: Scrum-half
Amateur team(s)
Years	Team	Apps	(Points)
2014–2019	Jockey Rosario	13	(15)
Senior career
Years	Team	Apps	(Points)
2020–2021	Selknam	13	(47)
2021−2022	Eibar RT		
2022–	Viadana		
2024–	→Zebre Parma		
- Correct as of 20 September 2024
International career
Years	Team	Apps	(Points)
2015–2016	Argentina U20		
2016	Argentina XV	1	(0)
- Correct as of 8 September 2024

Patricio Baronio Gauna (Note: In this Spanish name, the first or paternal surname is Baronio and the second or maternal family name is Gauna.) (born 5 June 1996) is an Argentine rugby union player and he currently plays for Viadana in Italian Top10 and on loan for Zebre Parma in United Rugby Championship as Permit Player. His preferred position is scrum-half.

== Professional career ==
Baronia debuted at age 18 in Argentina. In 2020 and 2021 he was selected for Chilean Superliga Americana de Rugby team Seknam. Under contract with Viadana, Baronio was named as Permit Player for Zebre Parma in summer 2024. ahead of the 2024–25 United Rugby Championship. He made his debut in Round 1 of United Rugby Championship in the 2024–25 season against the Cardiff.

In 2015 and 2016, he played for Argentina Under 20 for annual World Rugby U20 Championship. In 2016 he played also for Argentina XV.
