= Oscar Durán =

Uruguayan rugby union footballer

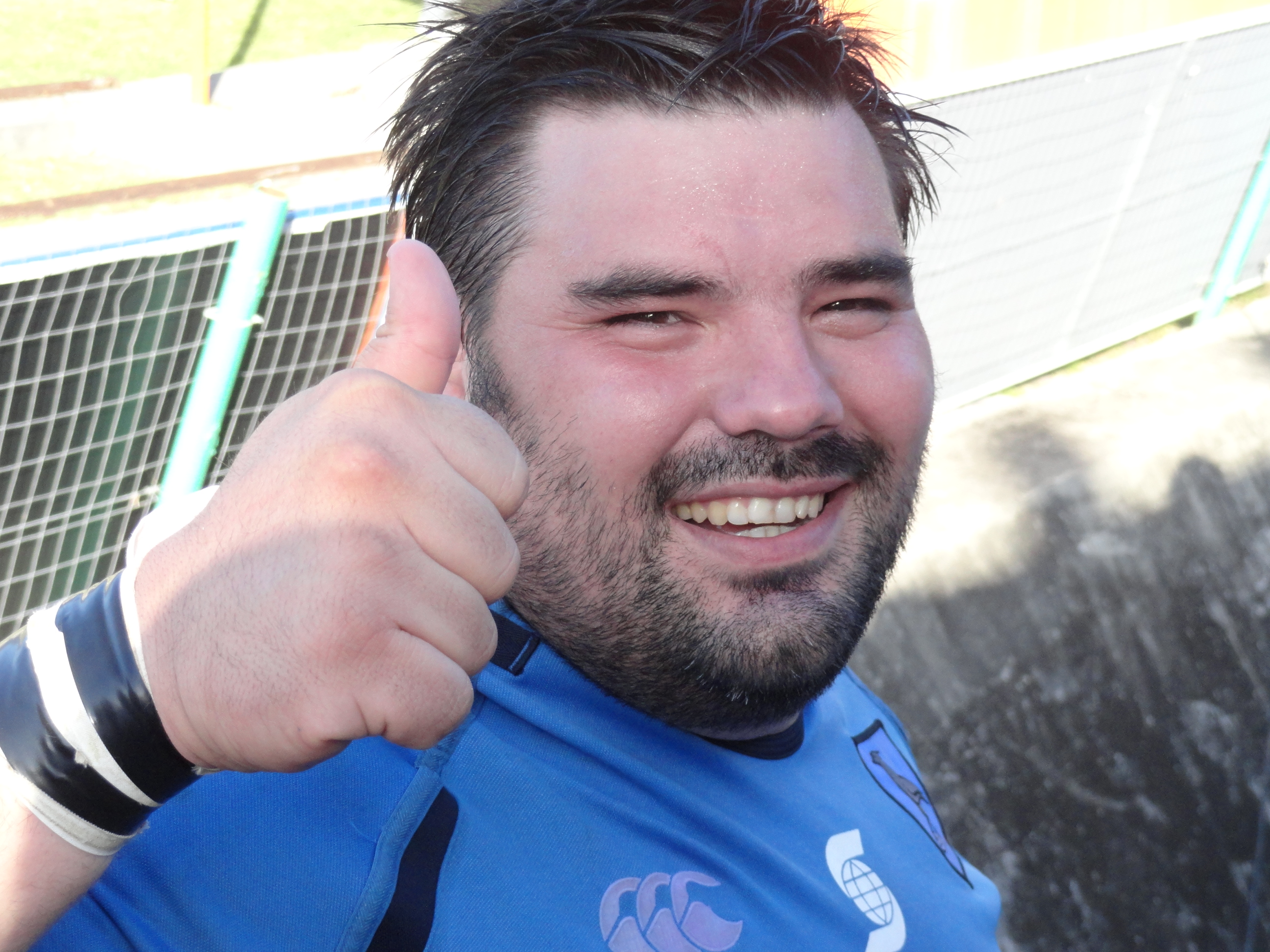
- Born: 16 August 1980 (age 46) Montevideo, Uruguay
- Height: 1.74 m (5 1/2 ft)
- Weight: 115 kg (18 st 2 lb; 254 lb)

Rugby union career
- Position(s): Prop, Hooker
International career
Years	Team	Apps	(Points)
2001-2015	Uruguay	35	(10)
- Correct as of 10 October 2015
Coaching career
- Years: Team
- 2015–: Uruguay (forwards coach)

Oscar Durán (born 16 August 1980) is a Uruguayan rugby union player. He was named in Uruguay's squad for the 2015 Rugby World Cup, and later retired after the tournament.

On 23 December 2015, he was named the new scrum-forwards coach for the national side under new head coach Estebán Meneses.
