= Jorge Zerbino =

Uruguay international rugby union player

- Born: 27 December 1991 (age 34)
- Height: 1.92 m (6 ft 3 1/2 in)
- Weight: 112 kg (17 st 9 lb; 247 lb)

Rugby union career
- Position: Lock
International career
Years	Team	Apps	(Points)
2015-	Uruguay	14	(0)
- Correct as of 10 October 2015

Jorge Zerbino (born 27 December 1991) is a Uruguayan rugby union player. He was named in Uruguay's squad for the 2015 Rugby World Cup. He plays as a second-row.
