= Mathías Palomeque =

Uruguayan rugby union player

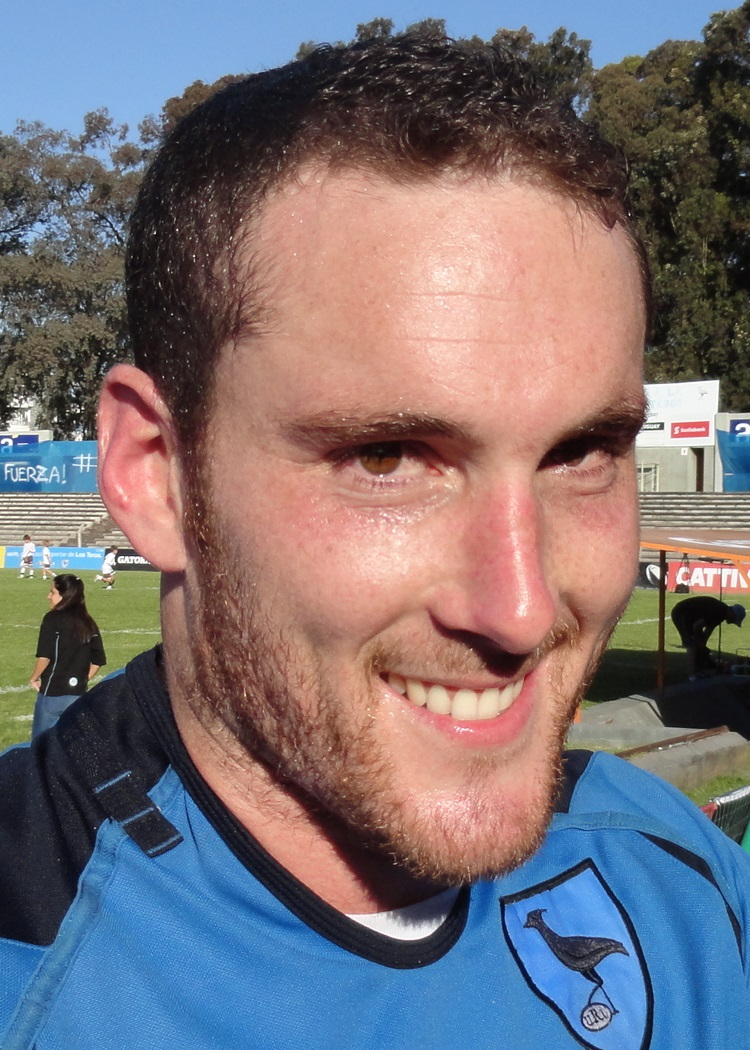
- Born: 7 October 1986 (age 40) San José de Mayo, Uruguay
- Height: 1.91 m (6 ft 3 in)
- Weight: 105 kg (16 st 7 lb; 231 lb)

Rugby union career
- Position: Lock
International career
| Years | Team | Apps | (Points) |
| 2011- | Uruguay | 28 | (5) |
- Correct as of 1 March 2016

Mathías Palomeque (born 7 October 1986) is a Uruguayan rugby union player. He was named in Uruguay's squad for the 2015 Rugby World Cup.
