= Alberto Román =

Uruguayan rugby union player

- Born: 1 June 1987 (age 39) Montevideo, Uruguay
- Height: 1.78 m (5 ft 10 in)
- Weight: 95 kg (14 st 13 lb; 209 lb)

Rugby union career
- Position: Centre
International career
Years	Team	Apps	(Points)
2011-	Uruguay	40	(30)
- Correct as of 1 March 2016

Alberto "Paco" Román (born 1 June 1987 in Montevideo) is a Uruguayan rugby union player who plays as a centre for Pucaru Stade Gaulois. He was named in Uruguay's squad for the 2015 Rugby World Cup.

In September 2012, he moved to Italy along with his countryman Jerónimo Etcheverry to play for Rugby Club Valpolicella.

His career started in 1994, when he joined the Deutscher Klub where "El Pata" established a rugby school for small children. Later on, this school merged with the DSM (Colegio Alemán), where Gonzalo "El manco" Laborde participated and mentor "Paco" during his firsts steps. One of his first important achievements was in 2002, when Colegio Alemán won for the first time the Uruguayan championship against British School. In 2003, he joined the "Alte Deutsche", a newly created Rugby Club for German School Alumni.
