= Joaquín Prada =

Uruguayan rugby union player

- Born: 15 July 1991 (age 35)
- Height: 1.81 m (5 ft 11 1/2 in)
- Weight: 95 kg (14 st 13 lb; 209 lb)

Rugby union career
- Position: Centre
International career
Years	Team	Apps	(Points)
2013-	Uruguay	46	(87)
- Correct as of 23 November 2018

Joaquín Prada (born 15 July 1991) is a Uruguayan rugby union player who currently plays as a centre for Los Cuervos at the Uruguayan Rugby Championship. He was named in Uruguay's squad for the 2015 Rugby World Cup.
