= Tevita Cavubati =

Fijian rugby union player (born 1987)

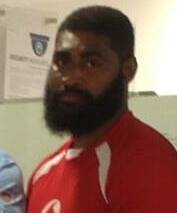
- Born: Tevita Gucake Naqaqa Cavubati; 12 August 1987 (age 39) Suva, Fiji
- Height: 2.01 m (6 ft 7 in)
- Weight: 120 kg (18 st 13 lb; 265 lb)
- Notable relative: Bill Cavubati

Rugby union career
- Position: Lock
Amateur team(s)
Years	Team	Apps	(Points)
2010–2012	Waimea Old Boys		
Senior career
Years	Team	Apps	(Points)
2012–2014	Tasman Makos	25	(0)
2014–2015	Ospreys	5	(0)
2015–2017	Worcester Warriors	24	(5)
2019–2021	Newcastle Falcons	37	(10)
2021–2022	Harlequins	11	(5)
2022–2023	Perpignan		
2023–2024	Bédarrides		
2024–	[[Blackheath F.C.|Blackheath]]		
- Correct as of 3 July 2019
International career
Years	Team	Apps	(Points)
2011–	Fiji	26	(10)
- Correct as of 7 September 2019

Tevita ‘Tex’ Cavubati (born 12 August 1987) is a Fijian Rugby Union player who currently plays as a lock for Tonbridge Juddians in National League 1 and for Fiji.

== Club career ==
Cavubati comes from a strong rugby family, with brother Bill turning out as a prop for Wellington in the ITM Cup and playing 38 tests for Fiji. His first chance in rugby came when he played for Spotswood United in New Zealand, between 2008 and 2010, however despite gaining good competitive experience here he was never able to make the ITM Cup side of his local union, Taranaki. After a short spell back in his native Fiji he returned to New Zealand ahead of the 2012 ITM Cup this time earning a contract with the Tasman Makos. He has since become an established member of the Makos side and helped them to reach the Premiership final in 2014.

After playing for Welsh region Ospreys in the Pro14, as of 16 September 2015, Cavubati signed for English club Worcester Warriors from the 2015–16 season.

On 2 May 2017, Cavubati signed for Premiership rivals Newcastle Falcons from the 2017-18 Premiership campaign.

In 2016 he sustained an injury to his right leg which kept him out of the game for five months. He signed for Harlequins in July 2019, joining the club after the 2019 Rugby World Cup.

On 3 July 2019, Cavubati signed for Premiership rivals Harlequins from the 2019–20 season.

On 11 July 2021, Cavubati makes his move to France as he signed for Perpignan in the Top 14 competition ahead of the 2021–22 season.

On 3 July 2024, Cavubati moved back to England and signed for Blackheath FC, the oldest independent Rugby club in the world, based in South East London.

== International career ==
Cavubati received his first senior cap for Fiji in a match against Tonga in July 2011 and had to wait another 3 years before adding to his cap tally. His impressive form for Tasman in 2014 saw him named in the squad for the 2014 end-of-year rugby union internationals and he played all 3 tests in this series against France, Wales and the United States.
