= Juan de Freitas =

Uruguay international rugby union player

- Born: 13 December 1989 (age 36)
- Height: 1.81 m (6 ft)
- Weight: 97 kg (15 st 4 lb; 214 lb)

Rugby union career
- Position: Flanker
International career
Years	Team	Apps	(Points)
2009-	Uruguay	43	(17)
- Correct as of 7 March 2017

Juan de Freitas (born 13 December 1989) is a Uruguayan rugby union player. He was named in Uruguay's squad for the 2015 Rugby World Cup.

== Honours ==
Uruguay U20

- World Rugby Under 20 Trophy: 2008
