= Carlos Arboleya =

Uruguayan rugby union player

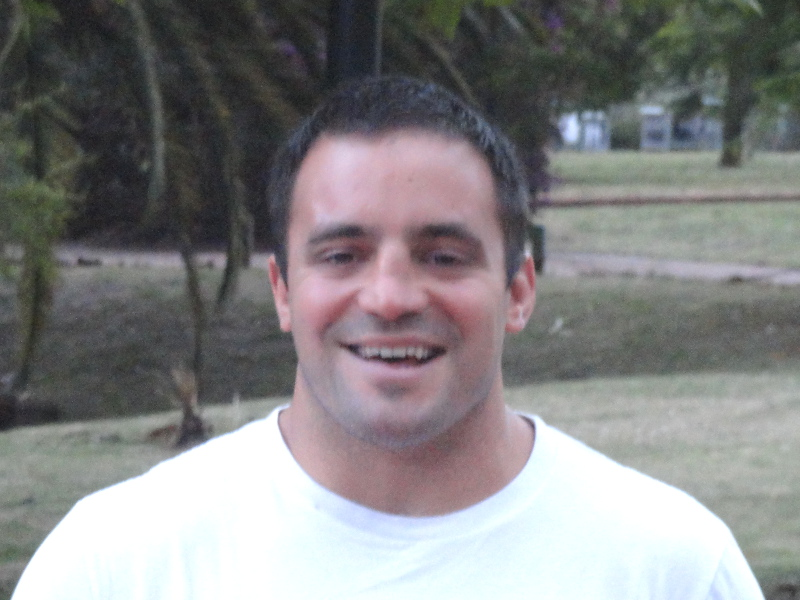
- Arboleya in 2015
- Born: 23 July 1985 (age 41) Montevideo, Uruguay
- Height: 1.73 m (5 ft 8 in)
- Weight: 110 kg (17 st 5 lb; 240 lb)

Rugby union career
- Position(s): Hooker, Prop
International career
| Years | Team | Apps | (Points) |
| 2004- | Uruguay | 67 | (25) |
- Correct as of 16 March 2018

Carlos Arboleya (born 23 July 1985) is a Uruguayan rugby union player. He was named in Uruguay's squad for the 2015 Rugby World Cup.

He is currently married to Maria Jose Faral.

== Test career ==
| | Span | Mat | Start | Sub | Pts | Tries | Conv | Pens | Drop | Won | Lost | Draw | % |
|---|---|---|---|---|---|---|---|---|---|---|---|---|---|
| All Tests | 2004-2018 | 67 | 39 | 28 | 25 | 5 | 0 | 0 | 0 | 29 | 37 | 1 | 44.02 |
| IRB Rugby World Cup | 2015-2015 | 4 | 3 | 1 | 5 | 1 | 0 | 0 | 0 | 0 | 4 | 0 | 0.00 |
