= Santiago Vilaseca =

Uruguay international rugby union player

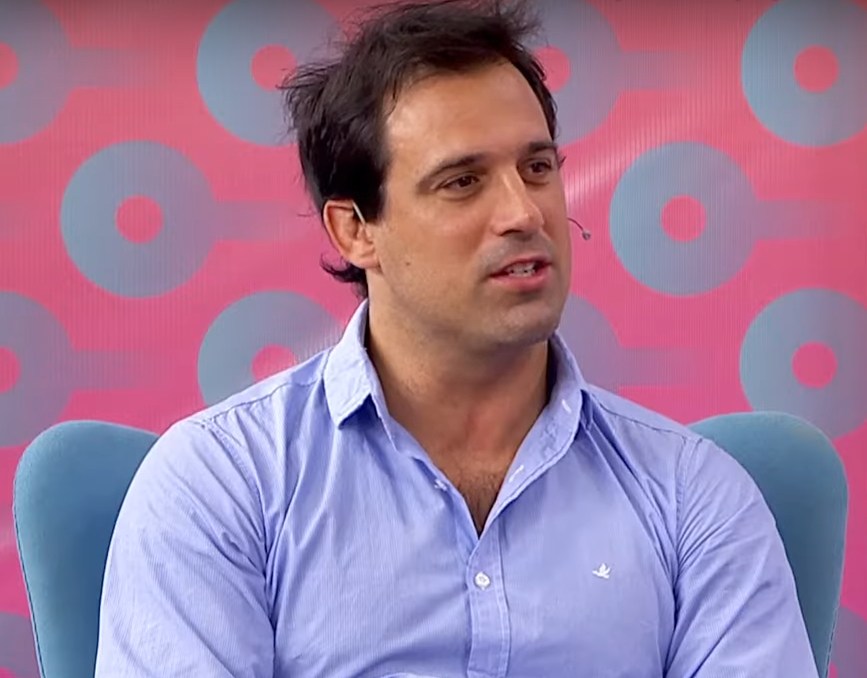
- Born: Santiago Vilaseca; September 17, 1984 (age 42) Montevideo, Uruguay
- Height: 6 ft 1.6 in (1.87 m)
- Weight: 230 lb (104 kg)
- School: The British Schools of Montevideo

Rugby union career
- Position: Lock
International career
Years	Team	Apps	(Points)
2008–present	Uruguay	37	(0)
- Correct as of 10 October 2015

Santiago Vilaseca (born 17 September 1984 in Montevideo), is a Uruguayan rugby union player. He currently plays a Lock for the Old Boys Club U21 in the Campeonato Uruguayo de Rugby.

Vilaseca, represents the Uruguay national team and has captained the side on many occasions, most notably during the 2015 Rugby World Cup. Having earned 32 caps for his country, on 30 August 2015 he was selected to captain Uruguay into their first World Cup campaign in 12 years, the last being during the 2003 Rugby World Cup.
