= Fernando Bascou =

Uruguayan rugby union player

- Born: 5 April 1987 (age 39)
- Height: 1.88 m (6 ft 2 in)
- Weight: 96 kg (15 st 2 lb; 212 lb)

Rugby union career
- Position: Flanker
International career
Years	Team	Apps	(Points)
2011-	Uruguay	26	(0)
- Correct as of 27 September 2015

Fernando Bascou (born 5 April 1987) is a Uruguayan rugby union player. He was named in Uruguay's squad for the 2015 Rugby World Cup.
