= Nicolás Klappenbach =

Uruguay international rugby union player

- Born: March 25, 1982 (age 44) Montevideo, Uruguay
- Height: 5 ft 10 in (1.78 m)
- Weight: 214 lb (97 kg)

Rugby union career
- Position: Hooker
International career
Years	Team	Apps	(Points)
2005–present	Uruguay	48	(10)
- Correct as of 10 October 2015

Nicolás Klappenbach (born 25 March 1982) is a Uruguayan rugby union player. He plays as a hooker. He is a physician.

Klappenbach plays for Champagnat Rugby, in Uruguay.

He has 38 caps for Uruguay, since 2005, with 2 tries scored, 10 points on aggregate. He played at the 2007 Rugby World Cup and at the 2011 Rugby World Cup qualifyings. He was involved in the 2015 Rugby World Cup successful qualification. He has been the captain for the "Teros".
