= Francisco Bulanti =

Uruguayan rugby union player

- Born: 12 April 1980 (age 46)
- Height: 1.78 m (5 ft 10 in)
- Weight: 87 kg (13 st 10 lb; 192 lb)

Rugby union career
- Position: Wing
International career
Years	Team	Apps	(Points)
2004-	Uruguay	24	(15)
- Correct as of 6 October 2015

Francisco Bulanti (born 12 April 1980) is a Uruguayan rugby union player. He was named in Uruguay's squad for the 2015 Rugby World Cup.
