= Diego Magno =

Uruguayan rugby union player

- Born: 27 April 1989 (age 37)
- Height: 1.89 m (6 ft 2 1/2 in)
- Weight: 105 kg (16 st 7 lb; 231 lb)

Rugby union career
- Position: Flanker / No. 8
Senior career
Years	Team	Apps	(Points)
2019−2021	Houston SaberCats	29	(5)
2022−	Peñarol Rugby		
International career
Years	Team	Apps	(Points)
2008−2009	Uruguay Under 20	9	(10)
2010−2023	Uruguay	104	(70)
- Correct as of 31 July 2023

Diego Magno (born 27 April 1989) is a Uruguayan rugby union player who played flanker and 8 for the Houston SaberCats in Major League Rugby (MLR).

He was named in Uruguay's squad for the 2015 and 2019 Rugby World Cup.

== Honours ==
Uruguay U20

- World Rugby Under 20 Trophy: 2008
