= Agustín Alonso =

Uruguayan rugby union player

- Born: 24 September 1991 (age 35) Montevideo, Uruguay
- Height: 1.74 m (5 1/2 ft)
- Weight: 85 kg (13 st 5 lb; 187 lb)

Rugby union career
- Position: Flanker
International career
Years	Team	Apps	(Points)
2014-	Uruguay	13	(10)
- Correct as of 10 October 2015

Agustín Alonso (born 24 September 1991) is a Uruguayan rugby union player. He was named in Uruguay's squad for the 2015 Rugby World Cup.
