= Santiago Gibernau =

Uruguayan rugby union player

- Born: 15 May 1988 (age 38) Montevideo, Uruguay
- Height: 1.80 m (5 ft 11 in)
- Weight: 80 kg (12 st 8 lb; 180 lb)

Rugby union career
International career
Years	Team	Apps	(Points)
2009-	Uruguay	37	(50)
- Correct as of 26 November 2016

Santiago Gibernau (born 15 May 1988) is a Uruguayan rugby union player. He plays as a wing.

Gibernau plays for Carrasco Polo Club, in the Campeonato Uruguayo de Rugby.

He has 35 caps for Uruguay, with 10 tries scored, 50 points on aggregate. He had his first game at the 85–7 win over Paraguay, at 25 April 2009, in Montevideo, at the 2011 Rugby World Cup qualifyings. He scored a try in his international debut. He was named in Uruguay's squad for the 2015 Rugby World Cup. He played in three games but didn't scored.

== Honours ==
Uruguay U20

- World Rugby Under 20 Trophy: 2008
