= Matías Beer =

Uruguay international rugby union player

- Born: 16 December 1993 (age 32)
- Height: 1.95 m (6 ft 5 in)
- Weight: 102 kg (16 st 1 lb; 225 lb)

Rugby union career
- Position(s): Lock, Flanker
International career
Years	Team	Apps	(Points)
2014-	Uruguay	50	(43)
- Correct as of 1 March 2016

Matías Beer Vuco (born 16 December 1993) is a decorated Uruguayan rugby union player.

He was named in Uruguay's squad for the 2013 Junior Rugby World Cup hosted in Temuco, Chile and immediately afterwards drafted for the Uruguayan Senior National Squad after an outstanding performance.

He was named in Uruguay's squad for the 2015 Rugby World Cup and became the youngest player on the first team to play all 4 venues. He was one of the most distinguished Uruguayan players throughout the tournament catching the eye of the entire audience for his sacrifice and fierce despite his physical complexion. He retired from the National Squad in 2016 because of concussion injuries suffered during his career but continued to play in his club for an additional year.

After only playing for a year with his club and getting to win the National Championship in 2016 as member of the first squad and referrer he was forced to retire for medical reasons because of additional severe concussion episodes. He stayed close to his club during the following years as assistant coach getting to win the National Championship in 2017 and 2019.
