= Alejandro Nieto =

Uruguayan rugby union player

Alejandro Martin Nieto Serra
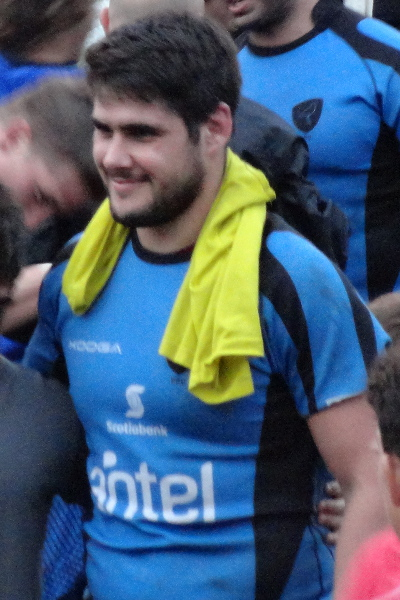
- Alejandro Nieto Serra at 2016 Americas Rugby Championship vs USA
- Born: Alejandro Martin Nieto Serra; 7 January 1988 (age 38) Montevideo, Uruguay
- Height: 1.86 m (6 ft)
- Weight: 108 kg (17 st 0 lb; 238 lb)

Rugby union career
- Position: Number 8
Senior career
| Years | Team | Apps | (Points) |
| 2019 | Houston SaberCats | 11 | (5) |
| 2020− | Peñarol | 1 | (0) |
International career
| Years | Team | Apps | (Points) |
| 2008 | Uruguay Under 20 | 4 | (0) |
| 2012- | Uruguay | 69 | (35) |
- Correct as of 7 September 2019

Alejandro Nieto (born 7 January 1988 in Montevideo) is a Uruguayan rugby union player who plays for Champagnat. He was a member of the Uruguay squad at the 2015 Rugby World Cup.

He has been an active participant in the Uruguay qualifying run for RWC 2019, gaining the final place in pool D. This included victories over Canada, Namibia, Russia and Spain.

In 2019 Nieto signed for the Houston SaberCats.

== Personal ==
Nieto attended St Catherine's School and the Crandon Institute.

== Honours ==
Uruguay U20

- World Rugby Under 20 Trophy: 2008
