= 2015 Rugby World Cup final =

Rugby competition in London, England

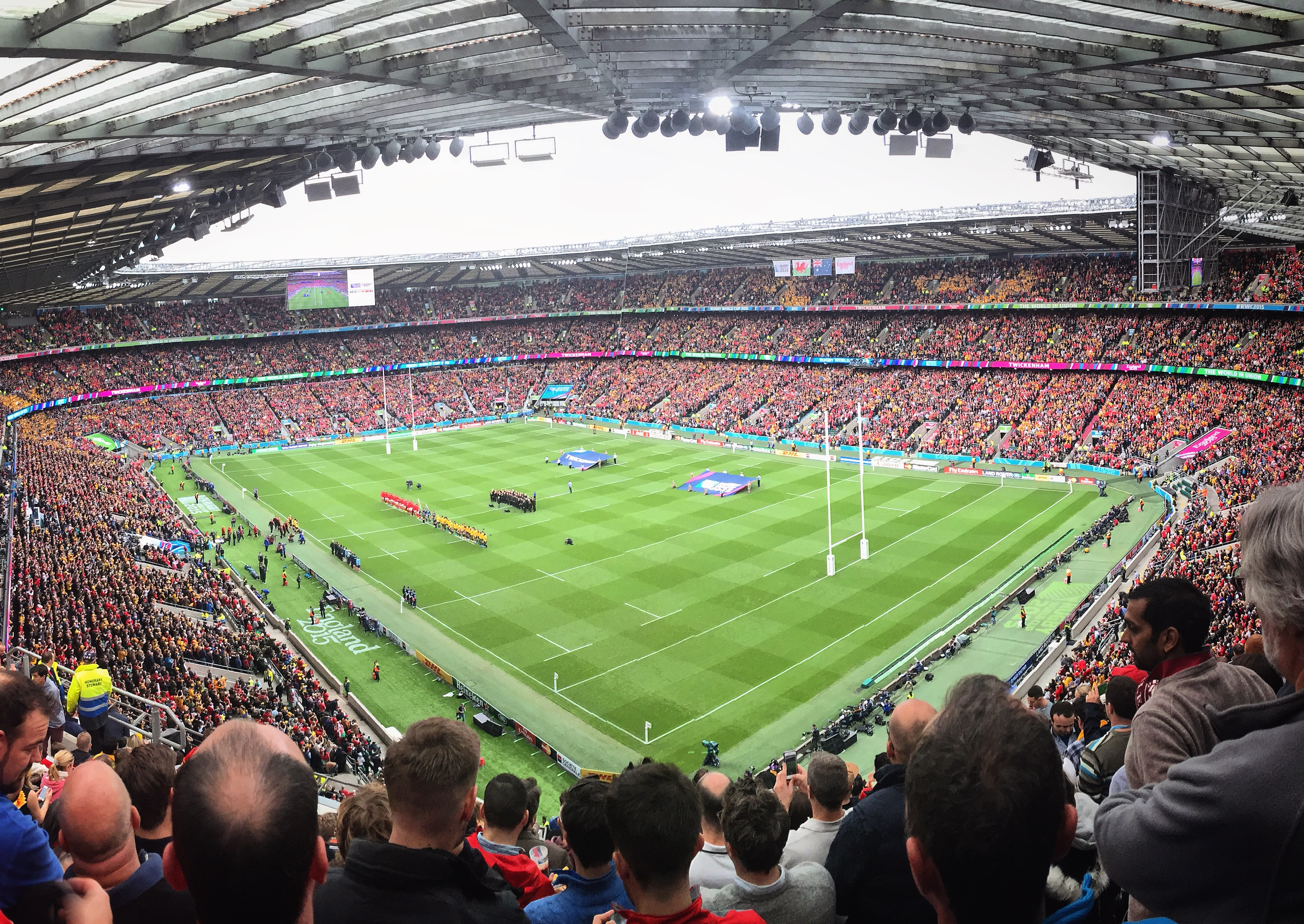
- Twickenham Stadium hosted the match
- Event: 2015 Rugby World Cup
| New Zealand | Australia |
| (New Zealand) | (Australia) |
| 34 | 17 |
- Date: 31 October 2015
- Venue: Twickenham Stadium, London
- Man of the Match: Dan Carter (New Zealand)
- Referee: Nigel Owens (Wales)
- Attendance: 80,125

The 2015 Rugby World Cup final was a rugby union match to determine the winner of the 2015 Rugby World Cup, played between reigning champions New Zealand and their rivals Australia on 31 October 2015 at Twickenham Stadium in London. New Zealand beat Australia 34–17, winning the World Cup for a record third time, and becoming the first team to retain the Webb Ellis Cup. The 51 points scored in this final is the highest of all Rugby World Cup finals.

This match saw a new record for tries in a Rugby World Cup final with the teams combining for five, surpassing the previous record of four scored in the 1987 final. It was only the second final between two teams from the Southern Hemisphere, the previous one being South Africa's win over New Zealand in 1995.

== Route to the final ==
New Zealand
Round
Australia
Opponent
Result
Pool stage
Opponent
Result
Argentina
26–16
Match 1
Fiji
28–13
Namibia
58–14
Match 2
Uruguay
65–3
Georgia
43–10
Match 3
England
33–13
Tonga
47–9
Match 4
Wales
15–6

| Pos | Team | Pld | W | D | L | PF | PA | PD | T | B | Pts | Qualification |
|---|---|---|---|---|---|---|---|---|---|---|---|---|
| 1 | New Zealand | 4 | 4 | 0 | 0 | 174 | 49 | +125 | 25 | 3 | 19 | Advanced to the quarter-finals and qualified for the 2019 Rugby World Cup |
| 2 | Argentina | 4 | 3 | 0 | 1 | 179 | 70 | +109 | 22 | 3 | 15 | Advanced to the quarter-finals and qualified for the 2019 Rugby World Cup |
| 3 | Georgia | 4 | 2 | 0 | 2 | 53 | 123 | −70 | 5 | 0 | 8 | Eliminated but qualified for 2019 Rugby World Cup |
| 4 | Tonga | 4 | 1 | 0 | 3 | 70 | 130 | −60 | 8 | 2 | 6 | |
| 5 | Namibia | 4 | 0 | 0 | 4 | 70 | 174 | −104 | 8 | 1 | 1 | |

Final standing

| Pos | Team | Pld | W | D | L | PF | PA | PD | T | B | Pts | Qualification |
|---|---|---|---|---|---|---|---|---|---|---|---|---|
| 1 | Australia | 4 | 4 | 0 | 0 | 141 | 35 | +106 | 17 | 1 | 17 | Advanced to the quarter-finals and qualified for the 2019 Rugby World Cup |
| 2 | Wales | 4 | 3 | 0 | 1 | 111 | 62 | +49 | 11 | 1 | 13 | Advanced to the quarter-finals and qualified for the 2019 Rugby World Cup |
| 3 | England | 4 | 2 | 0 | 2 | 133 | 75 | +58 | 16 | 3 | 11 | Eliminated but qualified for 2019 Rugby World Cup |
| 4 | Fiji | 4 | 1 | 0 | 3 | 84 | 101 | −17 | 10 | 1 | 5 | |
| 5 | Uruguay | 4 | 0 | 0 | 4 | 30 | 226 | −196 | 2 | 0 | 0 | |

Opponent
Result
Knockout stage
Opponent
Result
France
62–13
Quarter-finals
Scotland
35–34
South Africa
20–18
Semi-finals
Argentina
29–15

=== New Zealand ===
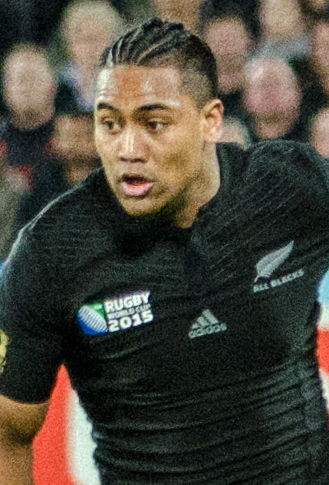
Julian Savea scored a joint record eight tries in New Zealand's progress to the final, including two hat-tricks

Having been in band 1 in the draw, New Zealand were placed as the top team participating in Pool C. They began their tournament with a steady performance against Argentina, earning a 26–16 victory (though having been 13–12 down at half time) in front of a then-record crowd of 89,019 at Wembley on 20 September. On that day, their starting XV was the most experienced ever. Their performance remained steady four days later with a 58–14 win over Namibia in which they scored nine tries. On 2 October, they faced Georgia – their first ever encounter – at the Millennium Stadium, with Julian Savea scoring a hat-trick to help New Zealand to a 43–10 win. New Zealand's last pool match was on 9 October, with their performance improving to reach a successful 47–9 victory over Tonga, which included a try by Ma'a Nonu who earned his 100th test cap during the match.

In the quarter-finals, the All Blacks faced France, the last team to beat New Zealand in a Rugby World Cup match (in the quarter-final stage of the 2007 Rugby World Cup, also at the Millennium Stadium). However, New Zealand defeated France emphatically 62–13, the highest winning margin in a World Cup knockout game since their win over Wales in 1987. Julian Savea scored a second hat-trick in the rout, equaling Jonah Lomu and Bryan Habana's record of eight tries in a World Cup. New Zealand reached the final after defeating South Africa 20–18 in a tight semi-final on 24 October, where New Zealand became the first ever nation to make four Rugby World Cup finals, having previously made the 1987, 1995 and 2011 tournament deciders.

=== Australia ===
Having also been in band 1 in the draw, Australia were placed as the top team in Pool A, and began their campaign with a 28–13 win over Fiji in Cardiff. Head Coach Michael Cheika, who had only been in charge of the team since 22 October 2014, had been open about the short four-day turn-around between Fiji and Uruguay, and openly admitted he would field two different starting XVs against either team. Had it not been for an injury to James Slipper in the Fiji game, Cheika would have followed this through; instead, he made 14 changes for the match against Uruguay. On 27 September, they crushed Uruguay 65–3, scoring 11 tries, including two each for Sean McMahon, Ben McCalman and Drew Mitchell. They then went on to defeat hosts England at Twickenham, with Bernard Foley scoring two tries, kicking all three conversions and scoring all four penalties in a record 33–13 win. On 10 October, Australia won 15–6 against Wales in the last game of the pool stage; no tries were scored in the match — the first time this had happened since 1947 — but Foley scored five of the six penalties that he took. During the match, Australia successfully defended for nearly 10 minutes with two players in the sin bin, a period of play that was widely referred to in the media as potentially "defining" the Australian campaign.

Australia nearly lost their quarter-final match on 18 October, requiring a controversial last-minute penalty from Foley to beat Scotland 35–34. The decision by referee Craig Joubert to award a penalty was later deemed incorrect by World Rugby, who issued a statement saying Joubert should have given a scrum instead. Despite this, Australia went on to the semi-final and faced Argentina. They defeated the Pumas 29–15, to reach the final, to become the second team, after New Zealand, to make four Rugby World Cup finals, having previously played in the 1991, 1999 and 2003 finals.

== Match ==
=== Summary ===
New Zealand played with most of the possession and territory early in the match. After eight minutes, Dan Carter scored the first points in the match, putting New Zealand ahead 3–0. In the 15th minute New Zealand fullback Ben Smith knocked the ball on, and from the resulting scrum New Zealand were penalised when their front row collapsed allowing Bernard Foley to tie the scores. Referee Nigel Owens awarded a penalty to New Zealand after Sekope Kepu made a high tackle on Dan Carter. Carter successfully kicked a penalty goal, and gave New Zealand a three-point lead. At the kick off Wallabies lock Kane Douglas injured his knee jumping for the ball, and was replaced by Dean Mumm. At 26 minutes Wallabies centre Matt Giteau suffered concussion tackling All Blacks lock Brodie Retallick and was replaced by Kurtley Beale. At 27 minutes Carter stretched New Zealand's lead with another penalty goal. The first try was scored just before halftime with New Zealand winger Nehe Milner-Skudder touching down in the corner. Carter converted giving New Zealand a lead of 16–3 at the end of the first half.

Two minutes into the second half, New Zealand's replacement centre Sonny Bill Williams offloaded the ball to Ma'a Nonu who beat a handful of Australian defenders to score a try, extending the lead to 21–3. In the 52nd minute, New Zealand fullback Ben Smith was sin-binned after tip-tackling Australia's Drew Mitchell. While Smith was in the sin-bin, Australia ran in two tries – the first to number eight David Pocock from a driving maul, and the second to centre Tevita Kuridrani following a kick to score. Foley converted both tries to bring Australia within four points with 16 minutes remaining. With 10 minutes left on the clock, Carter kicked a drop goal from 40 metres to open up the gap to seven points. Several minutes later, New Zealand were awarded a penalty, with Carter converting long range to give New Zealand a 27–17 lead. Needing to score quick tries to stay in the match, Australia lost the ball, which was kicked ahead by Ben Smith, allowing Beauden Barrett to chase and score the clinching try. Carter converted the try with his right (non-dominant) foot, to make the final score 34–17.

New Zealand became the first team in the History of the Rugby World Cup to successfully defend their title after eight editions of the tournament. They also became the first team to win three Rugby World Cups, previously winning the 1987 and 2011 editions, both of which were held on home soil, making this occasion the first time that New Zealand won the tournament on foreign soil.

=== Details ===
31 October 2015
16:00 GMT (UTC+00)

| New Zealand | 34–17 | Australia |
| Try: Milner-Skudder 39' c Nonu 42' m Barrett 79' c Con: Carter (2/3) 40', 80'; Pen: Carter (4/4) 8', 27', 36', 75'; Drop: Carter 70' | Report | Try: Pocock 53' c Kuridrani 64' c Con: Foley (2/2) 54', 65'; Pen: Foley (1/1) 14' |

Twickenham Stadium, London
Attendance: 80,125
Referee: Nigel Owens (Wales)

| New Zealand | Australia |

| FB | 15 | Ben Smith | (yellow card) 52' |
| RW | 14 | Nehe Milner-Skudder | | (substituted off) 65' |
| OC | 13 | Conrad Smith | | (substituted off) 40' |
| IC | 12 | Ma'a Nonu |
| LW | 11 | Julian Savea |
| FH | 10 | Dan Carter |
| SH | 9 | Aaron Smith | | (substituted off) 71' |
| N8 | 8 | Kieran Read |
| OF | 7 | Richie McCaw (c) | | (substituted off) 80' |
| BF | 6 | Jerome Kaino | | (substituted off) 71' |
| RL | 5 | Sam Whitelock |
| LL | 4 | Brodie Retallick |
| TP | 3 | Owen Franks | | (substituted off) 54' |
| HK | 2 | Dane Coles | | (substituted off) 65' |
| LP | 1 | Joe Moody | | (substituted off) 59' |
Replacements:
| HK | 16 | Keven Mealamu | | (substituted on) 65' |
| PR | 17 | Ben Franks | | (substituted on) 59' |
| PR | 18 | Charlie Faumuina | | (substituted on) 54' |
| N8 | 19 | Victor Vito | | (substituted on) 71' |
| FL | 20 | Sam Cane | | (substituted on) 80' |
| SH | 21 | Tawera Kerr-Barlow | | (substituted on) 71' |
| FH | 22 | Beauden Barrett | | (substituted on) 65' |
| CE | 23 | Sonny Bill Williams | | (substituted on) 40' |
Coach:
(New Zealand) Steve Hansen

| FB | 15 | Israel Folau |
| RW | 14 | Adam Ashley-Cooper |
| OC | 13 | Tevita Kuridrani |
| IC | 12 | Matt Giteau | (substituted off) 26' |
| LW | 11 | Drew Mitchell | 66' to 71' |
| FH | 10 | Bernard Foley |
| SH | 9 | Will Genia | (substituted off) 70' |
| N8 | 8 | David Pocock |
| OF | 7 | Michael Hooper |
| BF | 6 | Scott Fardy | (substituted off) 61' |
| RL | 5 | Rob Simmons |
| LL | 4 | Kane Douglas | (substituted off) 15' |
| TP | 3 | Sekope Kepu | (substituted off) 59' |
| HK | 2 | Stephen Moore (c) | (substituted off) 55' |
| LP | 1 | Scott Sio | (substituted off) 59' |
Replacements:
| HK | 16 | Tatafu Polota-Nau | (substituted on) 55' |
| PR | 17 | James Slipper | (substituted on) 59' |
| PR | 18 | Greg Holmes | (substituted on) 59' |
| LK | 19 | Dean Mumm | (substituted on) 15' |
| N8 | 20 | Ben McCalman | (substituted on) 61' |
| SH | 21 | Nick Phipps | (substituted on) 70' |
| CE | 22 | Matt To'omua | (substituted on) 66' | (substituted off) 71' |
| CE | 23 | Kurtley Beale | (substituted on) 26' |
Coach:
(Australia) Michael Cheika

Man of the Match:
Dan Carter (New Zealand)

Assistant referees:
Jérôme Garcès (France)
Wayne Barnes (England)
Television match official:
Shaun Veldsman (South Africa)

Notes:

- New Zealand became the first team to retain the Rugby World Cup title, and win a third World Cup title.
- This was the first time New Zealand won the World Cup on foreign soil.
- The aggregate 51 points scored was the most in a Rugby World Cup final.
- Ben Smith became the first player to receive a yellow card in a Rugby World Cup final.
- New Zealand's Sonny Bill Williams, Jerome Kaino and Sam Whitelock played in a record 14th consecutive World Cup win.
- Fourteen New Zealand players joined five Australians and one South African as two-time winners of the World Cup.

=== Statistics ===
| | New Zealand | Australia |
|---|---|---|
| Tries | 3 | 2 |
| Conversions | 2 | 2 |
| Penalties (attempts) | 4(4) | 1(1) |
| Drop goals (attempts) | 1(1) | 0(0) |
Match stats
| Territory (1st/2nd) | 54% (71% / 39%) | 46% (29% / 61%) |
| Possession (1st/2nd) | 53% (79% / 35%) | 47% (21% / 65%) |
Attacking
| Metres made | 513 | 425 |
| Clean breaks | 19 | 4 |
| Offloads | 8 | 2 |
| Carries crossed gainline | 53 | 38 |
| Tries from kicks | 0 | 0 |
| Kicks from hand | 39 | 38 |
| Passes | 151 | 139 |
| Runs | 121 | 115 |
Defending
| Tackles | 114 | 117 |
| Tackles missed | 15 | 27 |
| Turnovers won | 9 | 8 |
| Turnovers in own half | 3 | 7 |
| Rucks won | 83 | 79 |
| Rucks lost | 7 | 5 |
| Mauls won | 2 | 2 |
Set pieces
| Scrums (won/lost) | (3/0) | (4/1) |
| Line-outs (won/lost) | (14/0) | (7/3) |
Discipline
| Yellow cards | 1 | 0 |
| Red cards | 0 | 0 |
| Penalties conceded | 7 | 11 |
| Penalties conceded own half | 3 | 7 |
| Penalties conceded at lineout | 0 | 0 |
| Penalties conceded at scrum | 1 | 1 |
| Free Kicks conceded | 0 | 0 |
Reference: Rugby World Cup, ESPN Scrum, Stuff New Zealand

- Most kicks: 16 – Bernard Foley (Australia)
- Most passes: 82 – Aaron Smith (New Zealand)
- Most runs: 16 – Israel Folau (Australia)
- Most metres made: 124 – Nehe Milner-Skudder (New Zealand)
- Most clean breaks: 5 – Nehe Milner-Skudder (New Zealand)
- Most defenders beaten: 6 – Ben Smith (New Zealand)
- Most offloads: 2 –
  - Richie McCaw (New Zealand)
  - Ben Smith (New Zealand)
  - Sonny Bill Williams (New Zealand)
- Most carries crossed gain line: 8 –
  - Nehe Milner-Skudder (New Zealand)
  - Julian Savea (New Zealand)
- Most lineouts stolen: 1 – Brodie Retallick (New Zealand)
- Most lineouts won on throw: 12 – Dane Coles (New Zealand)
- Most tackles: 13 –
  - Dean Mumm (Australia)
  - David Pocock (Australia)
- Most missed tackles: 4 –
  - Michael Hooper (Australia)
  - Rob Simmons (Australia)
- Most turnovers conceded: 4 – Drew Mitchell (Australia)
- Most penalties conceded: 3 – Sekope Kepu (Australia)

== Closing ceremony ==
At the closing ceremony on 31 October, English singer Laura Wright sang World in Union. This was followed by the handover to Japan for the 2019 Rugby World Cup. Prince Harry presented the Webb Ellis Cup to winning captain Richie McCaw after the match, once the team's name had been engraved on the base of the trophy.
