= 2015 Rugby World Cup knockout stage =

The knockout stage of the 2015 Rugby World Cup began on 17 October with two quarter-finals and concluded on 31 October with the final at Twickenham Stadium in London with all matches played over the course of three consecutive weekends.

== Qualified teams ==
Australia went unbeaten to finish in first place in Pool A, with Wales in second place. In Pool B, South Africa finished top despite losing their opening match against Japan, ahead of Scotland in second place. New Zealand also went unbeaten as winners of Pool C, with Argentina in second. Pool D was topped by Northern Hemisphere teams, with Ireland coming first and France in second.

Pool	Winners	Runners-up
A	Australia	Wales
B	South Africa	Scotland
C	New Zealand	Argentina
D	Ireland	France

== Bracket ==
Quarter-finals
17 October – Twickenham Stadium
South Africa	23
Wales	19
17 October – Millennium Stadium
New Zealand	62
France	13
18 October – Millennium Stadium
Ireland	20
Argentina	43
18 October – Twickenham Stadium
Australia	35
Scotland	34

Semi-finals
24 October – Twickenham Stadium
South Africa	18
New Zealand	20
25 October – Twickenham Stadium
Argentina	15
Australia	29

Final
31 October – Twickenham Stadium
New Zealand	34
Australia	17
Third place
30 October – Olympic Stadium
South Africa	24
Argentina	13

== Quarter-finals ==
=== South Africa vs Wales ===
17 October 2015
16:00 BST (UTC+01)

South Africa	23–19	Wales
Try: Du Preez 75' m Pen: Pollard (5/7) 9', 13', 17', 21', 62'; Drop: Pollard 52'	Report	Try: G. Davies 18' c Con: Biggar (1/1) 19'; Pen: Biggar (3/4) 15', 47', 64'; Drop: Biggar 40'

Twickenham Stadium, London
Attendance: 79,572
Referee: Wayne Barnes (England)

South Africa	Wales

FB	15	Willie le Roux
RW	14	JP Pietersen
OC	13	Jesse Kriel	(substituted off) 68'
IC	12	Damian de Allende
LW	11	Bryan Habana
FH	10	Handré Pollard	(substituted off) 77'
SH	9	Fourie du Preez (c)
N8	8	Duane Vermeulen
OF	7	Schalk Burger
BF	6	Francois Louw	(substituted off) 68'
RL	5	Lood de Jager
LL	4	Eben Etzebeth	(substituted off) 68'
TP	3	Frans Malherbe	(substituted off) 61'
HK	2	Bismarck du Plessis	12' to 24'		(substituted off) 56'
LP	1	Tendai Mtawarira	(substituted off) 57'
Replacements:
HK	16	Adriaan Strauss	(substituted on) 12'	(substituted off) 24'	(substituted on) 56'
PR	17	Trevor Nyakane	(substituted on) 57'
PR	18	Jannie du Plessis	(substituted on) 61'
LK	19	Pieter-Steph du Toit	(substituted on) 68'
FL	20	Willem Alberts	(substituted on) 68'
SH	21	Ruan Pienaar
FH	22	Pat Lambie	(substituted on) 77'
CE	23	Jan Serfontein	(substituted on) 68'
Coach:
(South Africa) Heyneke Meyer

FB	15	Gareth Anscombe
RW	14	Alex Cuthbert
OC	13	Tyler Morgan	(substituted off) 68'
IC	12	Jamie Roberts
LW	11	George North
FH	10	Dan Biggar	(substituted off) 74'
SH	9	Gareth Davies	(substituted off) 71'
N8	8	Taulupe Faletau
OF	7	Sam Warburton (c)
BF	6	Dan Lydiate	(substituted off) 68'
RL	5	Alun Wyn Jones
LL	4	Luke Charteris	(substituted off) 64'
TP	3	Samson Lee	(substituted off) 56'
HK	2	Scott Baldwin	(substituted off) 57'
LP	1	Gethin Jenkins	(substituted off) 56'
Replacements:
HK	16	Ken Owens	(substituted on) 57'
PR	17	Paul James	(substituted on) 56'
PR	18	Tomas Francis	(substituted on) 56'
LK	19	Bradley Davies	(substituted on) 64'
FL	20	Justin Tipuric	(substituted on) 68'
SH	21	Lloyd Williams	(substituted on) 71'
FH	22	Rhys Priestland	(substituted on) 74'
CE	23	James Hook	(substituted on) 68'
Coach:
(New Zealand) Warren Gatland

Man of the Match:
Schalk Burger (South Africa)

Touch judges:
George Clancy (Ireland)
JP Doyle (England)
Television match official:
Graham Hughes (England)

=== New Zealand vs France ===
17 October 2015
20:00 BST (UTC+01)

New Zealand	62–13	France
Try: Retallick 11' c Milner-Skudder 23' c Savea (3) 29' c, 38' m, 59' c Kaino 50' m Read 64' c Kerr-Barlow (2) 68' c, 71' c Con: Carter (7/9) 12', 25', 31', 60', 65', 68', 72'; Pen: Carter (1/1) 7'	Report	Try: Picamoles 36' c Con: Parra (1/1) 37'; Pen: Spedding (1/1) 9'; Parra (1/2) 15'

Millennium Stadium, Cardiff
Attendance: 71,619
Referee: Nigel Owens (Wales)

New Zealand	France

FB	15	Ben Smith
RW	14	Nehe Milner-Skudder	(substituted off) 40'
OC	13	Conrad Smith	(substituted off) 52'
IC	12	Ma'a Nonu
LW	11	Julian Savea
FH	10	Dan Carter
SH	9	Aaron Smith	(substituted off) 65'
N8	8	Kieran Read
OF	7	Richie McCaw (c)	(substituted off) 69'
BF	6	Jerome Kaino	(substituted off) 65'
RL	5	Sam Whitelock
LL	4	Brodie Retallick
TP	3	Owen Franks	(substituted off) 51'
HK	2	Dane Coles	(substituted off) 60'
LP	1	Wyatt Crockett	(substituted off) 25'
Replacements:
HK	16	Keven Mealamu	(substituted on) 60'
PR	17	Joe Moody	(substituted on) 25'
PR	18	Charlie Faumuina	(substituted on) 51'
N8	19	Victor Vito	(substituted on) 65'
FL	20	Sam Cane	(substituted on) 69'
SH	21	Tawera Kerr-Barlow	(substituted on) 65'
FH	22	Beauden Barrett	(substituted on) 40'
CE	23	Sonny Bill Williams	(substituted on) 52'
Coach:
(New Zealand) Steve Hansen

FB	15	Scott Spedding
RW	14	Noa Nakaitaci
OC	13	Alexandre Dumoulin		(substituted off) 61'
IC	12	Wesley Fofana
LW	11	Brice Dulin
FH	10	Frédéric Michalak		(substituted off) 12'
SH	9	Morgan Parra		(substituted off) 69'
N8	8	Louis Picamoles	(yellow card) 47'	(substituted off) 72'
OF	7	Bernard Le Roux
BF	6	Thierry Dusautoir (c)
RL	5	Yoann Maestri
LL	4	Pascal Papé		(substituted off) 48'
TP	3	Rabah Slimani		(substituted off) 61'
HK	2	Guilhem Guirado		(substituted off) 57'
LP	1	Eddy Ben Arous		(substituted off) 61'
Replacements:
HK	16	Dimitri Szarzewski		(substituted on) 57'
PR	17	Vincent Debaty		(substituted on) 61'
PR	18	Nicolas Mas		(substituted on) 61'
N8	19	Damien Chouly		(substituted on) 72'
FL	20	Yannick Nyanga		(substituted on) 48'
SH	21	Rory Kockott		(substituted on) 69'
FH	22	Rémi Talès		(substituted on) 12'
CE	23	Mathieu Bastareaud		(substituted on) 61'
Coach:
(France) Philippe Saint-André

Man of the Match:
Julian Savea (New Zealand)

Touch judges:
Jaco Peyper (South Africa)
John Lacey (Ireland)
Television match official:
Shaun Veldsman (South Africa)

Notes:

- This was the largest winning margin in a Rugby World Cup knockout stage match, surpassing the 43-point winning margin New Zealand set against Wales in 1987.
- The nine tries scored by New Zealand is the most scored by one team in a Rugby World Cup knockout stage match.
- With his hat-trick of tries in this match, Julian Savea equalled Jonah Lomu and Bryan Habana's single-tournament record of eight tries.

=== Ireland vs Argentina ===
18 October 2015
13:00 BST (UTC+01)

Ireland	20–43	Argentina
Try: Fitzgerald 26' c Murphy 44' c Con: Madigan (2/2) 27', 45'; Pen: Madigan (2/4) 20', 53'	Report	Try: Moroni 3' c Imhoff (2) 10' c, 73' c Tuculet 69' c Con: Sánchez (4/4) 5', 10', 70', 74'; Pen: Sánchez (5/6) 13', 22', 51', 64', 77'

Millennium Stadium, Cardiff
Attendance: 72,316
Referee: Jérôme Garcès (France)

Ireland	Argentina

FB	15	Rob Kearney
RW	14	Tommy Bowe	(substituted off) 13'
OC	13	Keith Earls
IC	12	Robbie Henshaw
LW	11	Dave Kearney
FH	10	Ian Madigan
SH	9	Conor Murray	(substituted off) 70'
N8	8	Jamie Heaslip (c)
OF	7	Chris Henry
BF	6	Jordi Murphy	(substituted off) 70'
RL	5	Iain Henderson	(substituted off) 71'
LL	4	Devin Toner
TP	3	Mike Ross	(substituted off) 51'
HK	2	Rory Best	(substituted off) 66'
LP	1	Cian Healy	(substituted off) 51'
Replacements:
HK	16	Richardt Strauss	(substituted on) 66'
PR	17	Jack McGrath	(substituted on) 51'
PR	18	Nathan White	(substituted on) 51'
LK	19	Donnacha Ryan	(substituted on) 71'
FL	20	Rhys Ruddock	(substituted on) 70'
SH	21	Eoin Reddan	(substituted on) 70'
FH	22	Paddy Jackson
WG	23	Luke Fitzgerald	(substituted on) 13'
Coach:
(New Zealand) Joe Schmidt

FB	15	Joaquín Tuculet
RW	14	Santiago Cordero
OC	13	Matías Moroni		(substituted off) 68'
IC	12	Juan Martín Hernández
LW	11	Juan Imhoff
FH	10	Nicolás Sánchez
SH	9	Martín Landajo		(substituted off) 53'
N8	8	Leonardo Senatore		(substituted off) 23'	(substituted on) 28'	(substituted off) 51'
OF	7	Juan Martín Fernández Lobbe
BF	6	Pablo Matera
RL	5	Tomás Lavanini
LL	4	Guido Petti		(substituted off) 60'
TP	3	Ramiro Herrera	(yellow card) 17'			(substituted off) 72'
HK	2	Agustín Creevy (c)		(substituted off) 56'
LP	1	Marcos Ayerza		(substituted off) 68'
Replacements:
HK	16	Julián Montoya		(substituted on) 56'
PR	17	Lucas Noguera Paz		(substituted on) 68'
PR	18	Juan Pablo Orlandi		(substituted on) 23'	(substituted off) 28'	(substituted on) 72'
LK	19	Matías Alemanno		(substituted on) 60'
N8	20	Facundo Isa				(substituted on) 51'
SH	21	Tomás Cubelli		(substituted on) 53'
CE	22	Jerónimo de la Fuente		(substituted on) 68'
FB	23	Lucas González Amorosino
Coach:
(Argentina) Daniel Hourcade

Man of the Match:
Nicolás Sánchez (Argentina)

Touch judges:
Romain Poite (France)
Chris Pollock (New Zealand)
Television match official:
George Ayoub (Australia)

Notes:

- This was Argentina's first victory over Ireland since their 30–15 victory in the 2007 Rugby World Cup.
- This was Argentina's largest winning margin over Ireland, surpassing the 16-point margin recorded in June 2007.

=== Australia vs Scotland ===
18 October 2015
16:00 BST (UTC+01)

Australia	35–34	Scotland
Try: Ashley-Cooper 9' m Mitchell (2) 30' m, 43' c Hooper 40' m Kuridrani 64' c Con: Foley (2/5) 44', 65'; Pen: Foley (2/2) 54', 80'	Report	Try: Horne 18' c Seymour 59' m Bennett 74' c Con: Laidlaw (2/3) 19', 75'; Pen: Laidlaw (5/5) 14', 21', 34', 47', 69'

Twickenham Stadium, London
Attendance: 77,110
Referee: Craig Joubert (South Africa)

Australia	Scotland

FB	15	Kurtley Beale
RW	14	Adam Ashley-Cooper
OC	13	Tevita Kuridrani
IC	12	Matt Giteau
LW	11	Drew Mitchell
FH	10	Bernard Foley
SH	9	Will Genia	(substituted off) 71'
N8	8	Ben McCalman
OF	7	Michael Hooper
BF	6	Scott Fardy
RL	5	Rob Simmons	(substituted off) 66'
LL	4	Kane Douglas
TP	3	Sekope Kepu	(substituted off) 54'
HK	2	Stephen Moore (c)	(substituted off) 62'
LP	1	Scott Sio	(substituted off) 51'
Replacements:
HK	16	Tatafu Polota-Nau	(substituted on) 62'
PR	17	James Slipper	(substituted on) 51'
PR	18	Greg Holmes	(substituted on) 54'
LK	19	Dean Mumm	(substituted on) 66'
FL	20	Sean McMahon
SH	21	Nick Phipps	(substituted on) 71'
CE	22	Matt To'omua
FH	23	Quade Cooper
Coach:
(Australia) Michael Cheika

FB	15	Stuart Hogg
RW	14	Sean Maitland	(yellow card) 42'
OC	13	Mark Bennett
IC	12	Peter Horne		(substituted off) 71'
LW	11	Tommy Seymour		(substituted off) 63'
FH	10	Finn Russell
SH	9	Greig Laidlaw (c)
N8	8	David Denton
OF	7	John Hardie
BF	6	Blair Cowan		(substituted off) 67'
RL	5	Jonny Gray		(substituted off) 67'
LL	4	Richie Gray
TP	3	WP Nel		(substituted off) 75'
HK	2	Ross Ford		(substituted off) 54'
LP	1	Alasdair Dickinson		(substituted off) 47'
Replacements:
HK	16	Fraser Brown		(substituted on) 54'
PR	17	Gordon Reid		(substituted on) 47'
PR	18	Jon Welsh		(substituted on) 75'
LK	19	Tim Swinson		(substituted on) 67'
N8	20	Josh Strauss		(substituted on) 67'
SH	21	Henry Pyrgos
CE	22	Richie Vernon		(substituted on) 71'
WG	23	Sean Lamont		(substituted on) 63'
Coach:
(New Zealand) Vern Cotter

Man of the Match:
Matt Giteau (Australia)

Touch judges:
Glen Jackson (New Zealand)
Pascal Gaüzère (France)
Television match official:
Ben Skeen (New Zealand)

Notes:

- Fraser Brown and Tim Swinson were named to start, but after Ross Ford and Jonny Gray's three-match bans were overturned, they were named in the team minutes before kick off.
- Matt Giteau and Stephen Moore became the seventh and eighth Australian players to earn 100 test caps.
- The 34 points scored by Scotland were the most they had ever scored against Australia.
- After the match, World Rugby issued a statement over referee Craig Joubert's controversial decision to award a late penalty to Australia. The report concluded that while Joubert could not have consulted TMO at the time, his decision was in fact wrong, as the replay showed that Australia's Nick Phipps had played the ball before Scotland's Jon Welsh received it. The correct call should have been a scrum awarded to Australia for the original knock-on.

== Semi-finals ==
This was the first Rugby World Cup where no Northern Hemisphere team reached the semi-finals. The semi-final line-up consisted of the four Rugby Championship teams: New Zealand, South Africa, Argentina and Australia. Both matches were played at Twickenham which was also used for the same stage back in the 1999 Rugby World Cup.

=== South Africa vs New Zealand ===
24 October 2015
16:00 BST (UTC+01)

South Africa	18–20	New Zealand
Pen: Pollard (5/5) 3', 11', 21', 39', 58'; Lambie (1/1) 69'	Report	Try: Kaino 6' c Barrett 52' c Con: Carter (2/2) 9', 53'; Pen: Carter (1/2) 60'; Drop: Carter 46'

Twickenham Stadium, London
Attendance: 80,090
Referee: Jérôme Garcès (France)

South Africa	New Zealand

FB	15	Willie le Roux
RW	14	JP Pietersen
OC	13	Jesse Kriel
IC	12	Damian de Allende		(substituted off) 79'
LW	11	Bryan Habana	(yellow card) 52'
FH	10	Handré Pollard		(substituted off) 65'
SH	9	Fourie du Preez (c)
N8	8	Duane Vermeulen
OF	7	Schalk Burger				(substituted off) 64'
BF	6	Francois Louw		29' to 35'
RL	5	Lood de Jager		(substituted off) 60'
LL	4	Eben Etzebeth
TP	3	Frans Malherbe		(substituted off) 60'
HK	2	Bismarck du Plessis		(substituted off) 53'
LP	1	Tendai Mtawarira		(substituted off) 53'
Replacements:
HK	16	Adriaan Strauss		(substituted on) 53'
PR	17	Trevor Nyakane		(substituted on) 53'
PR	18	Jannie du Plessis		(substituted on) 60'
LK	19	Victor Matfield		(substituted on) 60'
FL	20	Willem Alberts		(substituted on) 29'	(substituted off) 35'	(substituted on) 64'
SH	21	Ruan Pienaar
FH	22	Pat Lambie		(substituted on) 65'
CE	23	Jan Serfontein		(substituted on) 79'
Coach:
(South Africa) Heyneke Meyer

FB	15	Ben Smith
RW	14	Nehe Milner-Skudder		(substituted off) 49'
OC	13	Conrad Smith
IC	12	Ma'a Nonu		(substituted off) 52'
LW	11	Julian Savea
FH	10	Dan Carter
SH	9	Aaron Smith
N8	8	Kieran Read
OF	7	Richie McCaw (c)
BF	6	Jerome Kaino	(yellow card) 39'	(substituted off) 67'
RL	5	Sam Whitelock
LL	4	Brodie Retallick
TP	3	Owen Franks		(substituted off) 52'
HK	2	Dane Coles		(substituted off) 67'
LP	1	Joe Moody		(substituted off) 69'
Replacements:
HK	16	Keven Mealamu		(substituted on) 67'
PR	17	Ben Franks		(substituted on) 69'
PR	18	Charlie Faumuina		(substituted on) 52'
N8	19	Victor Vito
FL	20	Sam Cane		(substituted on) 67'
SH	21	Tawera Kerr-Barlow
FH	22	Beauden Barrett		(substituted on) 49'
CE	23	Sonny Bill Williams		(substituted on) 52'
Coach:
(New Zealand) Steve Hansen

Man of the Match:
Ben Smith (New Zealand)

Touch judges:
Romain Poite (France)
John Lacey (Ireland)
Television match official:
George Ayoub (Australia)

Notes:

- New Zealand became the first team to reach four Rugby World Cup finals, having previously played in the 1987, 1995, and 2011 finals.
- New Zealand's Sonny Bill Williams, Jerome Kaino and Sam Whitelock played in a record 13 consecutive World Cup wins.

=== Argentina vs Australia ===
25 October 2015
16:00 GMT (UTC+00)

Argentina	15–29	Australia
Pen: Sánchez (5/5) 7', 24', 36', 45', 55'	Report	Try: Simmons 2' c Ashley-Cooper (3) 10' c, 32' m, 72' c Con: Foley (3/4) 3', 11', 73'; Pen: Foley (1/2) 48'

Twickenham Stadium, London
Attendance: 80,025
Referee: Wayne Barnes (England)

Argentina	Australia

FB	15	Joaquín Tuculet
RW	14	Santiago Cordero
OC	13	Marcelo Bosch
IC	12	Juan Martín Hernández		(substituted off) 44'
LW	11	Juan Imhoff		(substituted off) 18'
FH	10	Nicolás Sánchez
SH	9	Martín Landajo		(substituted off) 56'
N8	8	Leonardo Senatore		(substituted off) 49'
OF	7	Juan Martín Fernández Lobbe
BF	6	Pablo Matera
RL	5	Tomás Lavanini	(yellow card) 26'
LL	4	Guido Petti		(substituted off) 58'
TP	3	Ramiro Herrera		(substituted off) 61'
HK	2	Agustín Creevy (c)		(substituted off) 31'
LP	1	Marcos Ayerza		(substituted off) 61'
Replacements:
HK	16	Julián Montoya		(substituted on) 31'
PR	17	Lucas Noguera Paz		(substituted on) 61'
PR	18	Juan Figallo		(substituted on) 61'
LK	19	Matías Alemanno		(substituted on) 58'
N8	20	Facundo Isa		(substituted on) 49'
SH	21	Tomás Cubelli		(substituted on) 56'
CE	22	Jerónimo de la Fuente		(substituted on) 44'
FB	23	Lucas González Amorosino		(substituted on) 18'
Coach:
(Argentina) Daniel Hourcade

FB	15	Israel Folau	(substituted off) 65'
RW	14	Adam Ashley-Cooper
OC	13	Tevita Kuridrani
IC	12	Matt Giteau	(substituted off) 47'
LW	11	Drew Mitchell
FH	10	Bernard Foley
SH	9	Will Genia	(substituted off) 67'
N8	8	David Pocock
OF	7	Michael Hooper
BF	6	Scott Fardy	56' to 61'		(substituted off) 71'
RL	5	Rob Simmons	(substituted off) 67'
LL	4	Kane Douglas
TP	3	Sekope Kepu	(substituted off) 53'
HK	2	Stephen Moore (c)	(substituted off) 59'
LP	1	James Slipper	(substituted off) 53'
Replacements:
HK	16	Tatafu Polota-Nau	(substituted on) 59'
PR	17	Toby Smith	(substituted on) 53'
PR	18	Greg Holmes	(substituted on) 53'
LK	19	Dean Mumm	(substituted on) 67'
N8	20	Ben McCalman	(substituted on) 56'	(substituted off) 61'	(substituted on) 71'
SH	21	Nick Phipps	(substituted on) 67'
CE	22	Matt To'omua	(substituted on) 65'
CE	23	Kurtley Beale	(substituted on) 47'
Coach:
(Australia) Michael Cheika

Man of the Match:
Adam Ashley-Cooper (Australia)

Touch judges:
Jaco Peyper (South Africa)
George Clancy (Ireland)
Television match official:
Ben Skeen (New Zealand)

Notes:

- Michael Hooper, just 3 years and 140 days since his debut, became the fastest player ever to earn his 50th test cap, surpassing Australia's Al Baxter's record of 4 years and 44 days, and became the youngest Australian to achieve the 50-test landmark.
- James Slipper became Australia's most capped prop, surpassing both Ben Alexander's and Benn Robinson's record of 72 caps.
- Australia became the second team, after New Zealand, to reach four Rugby World Cup finals, having previously played in the 1991, 1999, and 2003 finals.

== Bronze final: South Africa vs Argentina ==
30 October 2015
20:00 GMT (UTC+00)

South Africa	24–13	Argentina
Try: Pietersen 6' c Etzebeth 43' m Con: Pollard (1/2) 7'; Pen: Pollard (4/5) 14', 33', 40', 48'	Report	Try: Orlandi 80' c Con: Sánchez (1/1) 80'; Pen: Sánchez (1/1) 52'; Drop: Sánchez 42'

Olympic Stadium, London
Attendance: 55,925
Referee: John Lacey (Ireland)

South Africa	Argentina

FB	15	Willie le Roux	(substituted off) 64'
RW	14	JP Pietersen
OC	13	Jesse Kriel
IC	12	Damian de Allende
LW	11	Bryan Habana	(substituted off) 67'
FH	10	Handré Pollard
SH	9	Ruan Pienaar	(substituted off) 77'
N8	8	Duane Vermeulen
OF	7	Schalk Burger	(substituted off) 53'	(substituted on) 61'	(substituted off) 66'
BF	6	Francois Louw		61' to 66'
RL	5	Victor Matfield (c)	(substituted off) 63'
LL	4	Eben Etzebeth
TP	3	Frans Malherbe	(substituted off) 61'	(substituted on) 70'
HK	2	Bismarck du Plessis	(substituted off) 49'
LP	1	Tendai Mtawarira	(substituted off) 40'
Replacements:
HK	16	Adriaan Strauss	(substituted on) 49'
PR	17	Trevor Nyakane	(substituted on) 40'
PR	18	Jannie du Plessis	(substituted on) 61'	(substituted off) 70'
LK	19	Lood de Jager	(substituted on) 63'
FL	20	Willem Alberts	(substituted on) 53'
SH	21	Rudy Paige	(substituted on) 77'
FH	22	Pat Lambie	(substituted on) 64'
CE	23	Jan Serfontein	(substituted on) 67'
Coach:
(South Africa) Heyneke Meyer

FB	15	Lucas González Amorosino
RW	14	Santiago Cordero
OC	13	Matías Moroni
IC	12	Jerónimo de la Fuente		(substituted off) 71'
LW	11	Horacio Agulla		(substituted off) 58'
FH	10	Nicolás Sánchez (c)
SH	9	Tomás Cubelli	(yellow card) 5'	(substituted off) 53'
N8	8	Juan Manuel Leguizamón
OF	7	Juan Martín Fernández Lobbe		(substituted off) 53'
BF	6	Javier Ortega Desio
RL	5	Tomás Lavanini
LL	4	Matías Alemanno		(substituted off) 47'
TP	3	Ramiro Herrera		(substituted off) 55'
HK	2	Julián Montoya		(substituted off) 77'
LP	1	Juan Figallo		15' to 22'		(substituted off) 61'	(substituted on) 64'	(substituted off) 71'
Replacements:
PR	16	Lucas Noguera Paz		(substituted on) 15'	(substituted off) 22'	(substituted on) 61'	64' to 71'
PR	17	Juan Pablo Orlandi		(substituted on) 55'
PR	18	Santiago García Botta		(substituted on) 77'
LK	19	Guido Petti		(substituted on) 47'
N8	20	Facundo Isa		(substituted on) 53'
SH	21	Martín Landajo		(substituted on) 53'
FH	22	Santiago González Iglesias		(substituted on) 71'
CE	23	Juan Pablo Socino		(substituted on) 58'
Coach:
(Argentina) Daniel Hourcade

Man of the Match:
Damian de Allende (South Africa)

Touch judges:
Glen Jackson (New Zealand)
Chris Pollock (New Zealand)
Television match official:
Graham Hughes (England)

Notes:

- Pat Lambie earned his 50th test cap for South Africa.

== Final: New Zealand vs Australia ==
31 October 2015
16:00 GMT (UTC+00)

New Zealand	34–17	Australia
Try: Milner-Skudder 39' c Nonu 42' m Barrett 79' c Con: Carter (2/3) 40', 80'; Pen: Carter (4/4) 8', 27', 36', 75'; Drop: Carter 70'	Report	Try: Pocock 53' c Kuridrani 64' c Con: Foley (2/2) 54', 65'; Pen: Foley (1/1) 14'

Twickenham Stadium, London
Attendance: 80,125
Referee: Nigel Owens (Wales)

New Zealand	Australia

FB	15	Ben Smith	(yellow card) 52'
RW	14	Nehe Milner-Skudder		(substituted off) 65'
OC	13	Conrad Smith		(substituted off) 40'
IC	12	Ma'a Nonu
LW	11	Julian Savea
FH	10	Dan Carter
SH	9	Aaron Smith		(substituted off) 71'
N8	8	Kieran Read
OF	7	Richie McCaw (c)		(substituted off) 80'
BF	6	Jerome Kaino		(substituted off) 71'
RL	5	Sam Whitelock
LL	4	Brodie Retallick
TP	3	Owen Franks		(substituted off) 54'
HK	2	Dane Coles		(substituted off) 65'
LP	1	Joe Moody		(substituted off) 59'
Replacements:
HK	16	Keven Mealamu		(substituted on) 65'
PR	17	Ben Franks		(substituted on) 59'
PR	18	Charlie Faumuina		(substituted on) 54'
N8	19	Victor Vito		(substituted on) 71'
FL	20	Sam Cane		(substituted on) 80'
SH	21	Tawera Kerr-Barlow		(substituted on) 71'
FH	22	Beauden Barrett		(substituted on) 65'
CE	23	Sonny Bill Williams		(substituted on) 40'
Coach:
(New Zealand) Steve Hansen

FB	15	Israel Folau
RW	14	Adam Ashley-Cooper
OC	13	Tevita Kuridrani
IC	12	Matt Giteau	(substituted off) 26'
LW	11	Drew Mitchell	(substituted off) 66'	(substituted on) 71'
FH	10	Bernard Foley
SH	9	Will Genia	(substituted off) 70'
N8	8	David Pocock
OF	7	Michael Hooper
BF	6	Scott Fardy	(substituted off) 61'
RL	5	Rob Simmons
LL	4	Kane Douglas	(substituted off) 15'
TP	3	Sekope Kepu	(substituted off) 59'
HK	2	Stephen Moore (c)	(substituted off) 55'
LP	1	Scott Sio	(substituted off) 59'
Replacements:
HK	16	Tatafu Polota-Nau	(substituted on) 55'
PR	17	James Slipper	(substituted on) 59'
PR	18	Greg Holmes	(substituted on) 59'
LK	19	Dean Mumm	(substituted on) 15'
N8	20	Ben McCalman	(substituted on) 61'
SH	21	Nick Phipps	(substituted on) 70'
CE	22	Matt To'omua	(substituted on) 66'	(substituted off) 71'
CE	23	Kurtley Beale	(substituted on) 26'
Coach:
(Australia) Michael Cheika

Man of the Match:
Dan Carter (New Zealand)

Touch judges:
Jérôme Garcès (France)
Wayne Barnes (England)
Television match official:
Shaun Veldsman (South Africa)

Notes:

- New Zealand became the first team to retain the Rugby World Cup title, and win a third World Cup title.
- This was the first time New Zealand won the World Cup on foreign soil.
- The aggregate 51 points scored was the most ever in a Rugby World Cup final.
- Ben Smith became the first player to receive a yellow card in a Rugby World Cup final.
- New Zealand's Sonny Bill Williams, Jerome Kaino and Sam Whitelock played in a record 14th consecutive World Cup wins.
- Fourteen New Zealand players joined five Australians and one South African as winners of multiple Rugby World Cups. McCaw became the first player to captain two World Cup winners.
