= Drew Mitchell =

Australian rugby union player (born 1984)

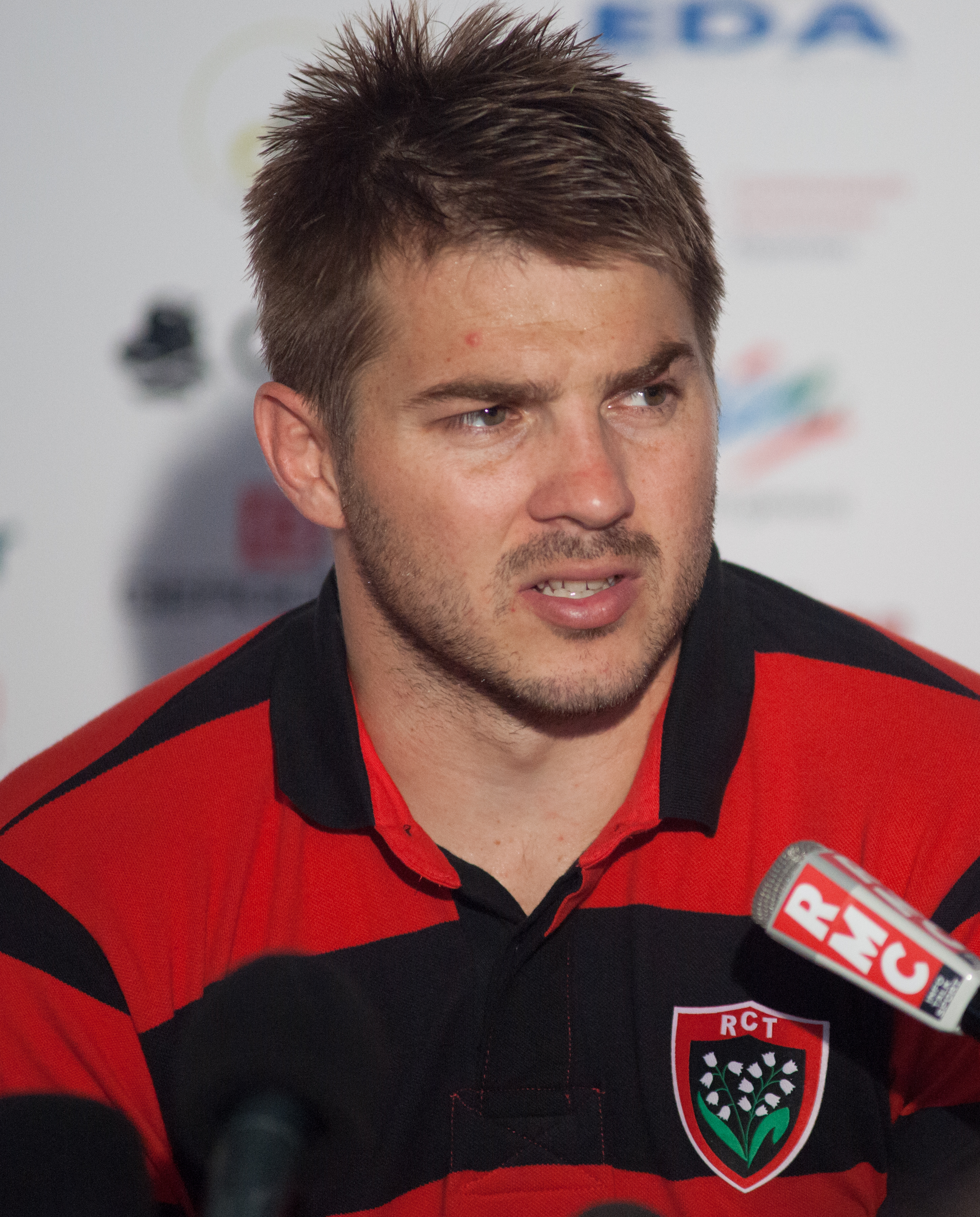
- Mitchell in 2013
- Born: Drew Allan Mitchell; 26 March 1984 (age 42) Liverpool, New South Wales, Australia
- Height: 1.82 m (5 ft 11 1/2 in)
- Weight: 92 kg (14 st 7 lb)
- School: St Patrick's College, Shorncliffe

Rugby union career
- Position(s): Wing, Fullback
Senior career
Years	Team	Apps	(Points)
2004–2006	Reds	35	(45)
2007–2009	Force	38	(45)
2010–2013	Waratahs	39	(85)
2013–2017	Toulon	82	(170)
- Correct as of 16 April 2017
International career
Years	Team	Apps	(Points)
2000	Australia U16	1	(0)
2001	Australian Schoolboys	5	(0)
2004	Australia U21	4	(0)
2008	Australia A	3	(15)
2005–2016	Australia	71	(170)
- Correct as of 10 September 2016
Medal record
Men's rugby union
Representing Australia
Rugby World Cup
Silver medal – second place	2015 England	Squad
Bronze medal – third place	2011 New Zealand	Squad

Drew Allan Mitchell (born 26 March 1984) is an Australian former professional rugby union player. He played on the wing or as fullback. Up to the 2006 season he played for the Queensland Reds in the Super 12. He played for the Western Force for the 2007–2009 Super 14 seasons. From 2010 to 2013 he played for the New South Wales Waratahs. And between 2013 and 2017 he played for Toulon in the French Top 14 competition. He made his Test debut for Australia in 2005, making 71 caps by his retirement. He is Australia's highest try-scorer in Rugby World Cup history.

== Early life ==
Mitchell was born Liverpool, New South Wales, Australia in 1984.

Mitchell was educated at Strathpine West State School and St Patrick's College, Shorncliffe and played his junior rugby for the Pine Rivers Pumas Rugby Union club, going on to play rugby for University of Queensland Rugby Club. Mitchell went on to captain the Queensland Academy of Sport U-19 team as well as going on to be an Australian Schoolboy and Sevens international.

== Career ==
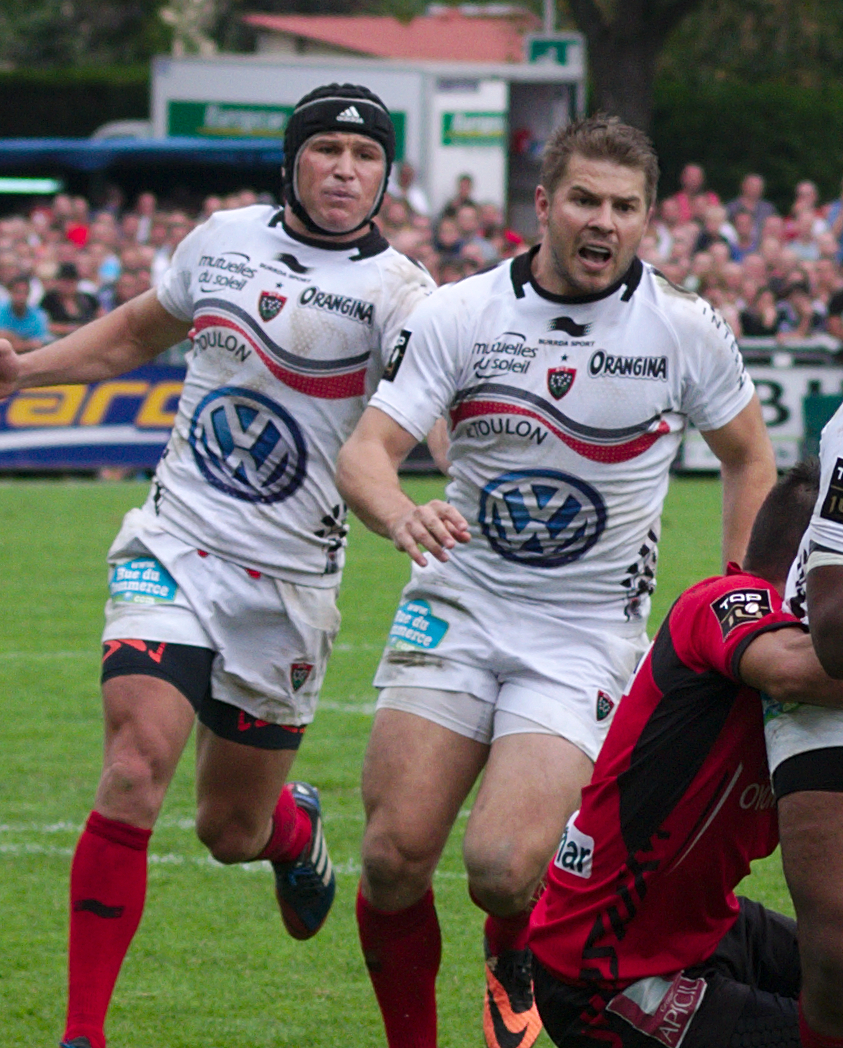
Mitchell alongside Australian teammate Matt Giteau with Toulon

Mitchell's domestic future again had a period of speculation when he was approached by the NSW Waratahs and the ACT Brumbies ahead of the 2010 Super Rugby season. Mitchell eventually signed for the NSW Waratahs, replacing Sam Norton-Knight.

Mitchell dislocated his ankle and broke a bone in his leg after he collided with Scott Higginbotham of the Reds during their match on Saturday, 23 April and was initially ruled out of the 2011 Rugby World Cup. However, he subsequently made a full recovery and was included in Australia's tournament squad. In the lead up to the 2012 Super Rugby season Mitchell suffered an ankle problem, and missed the Waratahs pre-season games. He did not play any games in the first half of the competition, making only five appearances all season.

In 2013, Mitchell agreed a two-year deal to play for Toulon for the 2012–13 Top 14 season. Mitchell went on to make 81 appearances for the Toulon side, securing several European & French crowns, his final match being a Top 14 Final loss to Clermont.

On 17 April 2017, Mitchell announced the end of his rugby career on Twitter in spite of previous reports of a possible return to the Super Rugby.

In February 2022, Mitchell participated in a charity match at Suncorp Stadium to raise funds for Tonga after a tsunami devastated the island nation. After taking a number of heavy tackles from the Tongan side, Mitchell jokingly remarked that he "donated a hamstring and a rib to the Tongan relief fund", and also stressed that there was "no chance" of a comeback to the sport.

== International career ==
Mitchell made his international debut for the Wallabies against South Africa in 2005, after being selected post-season with the Queensland Reds in which he was named Australia's Rookie of the Year.

Mitchell's international career stalled after Australia's 2005 Spring Tour, and he didn't feature for the Wallabies again until Wales toured in 2007. By this time Mitchell had switched to newly formed Western Force and impressed enough to gain a place in the Australia squad for the 2007 World Cup in France. He scored seven tries during that tournament.

He made one substitute appearance against Ireland and in two starts scored one try against the USA and two against Russia. He injured his hamstring in the final pool stage match of the 2011 World Cup, missing the remainder of the tournament.

Mitchell's international career turned to a standstill after he left the Super Rugby back in 2013, but with the Australian Rugby change of rules to the eligibility of overseas based Australian Rugby players under Giteau's law, Mitchell and Toulon teammate Matt Giteau were included in the Wallabies' squad for the 2015 Rugby Championship. With solid performances playing against the Springboks in the 24–20 win at Suncorp Stadium, and the 27–19 win against New Zealand at ANZ Stadium, Mitchell was included in the Wallabies' 31-man squad for the 2015 Rugby World Cup.

Mitchell's last match playing for the Wallabies was in the 2016 Rugby Championship victory against the Springboks, coming off the bench after a groin injury.

== Other ventures ==
In 2021, Mitchell was part of the commentary lineup for the Nine Network's Stan Sport coverage of Australia's Test matches.

== Career statistics ==
=== Club ===
As of 4 June 2017.

Statistics by club, season and competition
Club	Season	League				Other			Total		
Club	Season	Division	Apps	Tries	Points	Apps	Tries	Points	Apps	Tries	Points
Reds	2004	Super 12	11	2	10	—			11	2	10
Reds	2005	Super 12	11	4	20	—			11	4	20
Reds	2006	Super 12	13	3	15	—			13	3	15
Reds	Total		35	9	45	—			35	9	45
Force	2007	Super 14	13	3	15	—			13	3	15
Force	2008	Super 14	12	2	10	—			12	2	10
Force	2009	Super 14	13	4	20	—			13	4	20
Force	Total		38	9	45	—			38	9	45
Waratahs	2010	Super 14	14	9	45	—			14	9	45
Waratahs	2011	Super Rugby	9	6	30	—			9	6	30
Waratahs	2012	Super Rugby	4	1	5	—			4	1	5
Waratahs	2013	Super Rugby	12	1	5	1 (Note: Appearance in the 2013 Lions series)	0	0	13	1	5
Waratahs	Total		39	17	85	1	0	0	40	17	85
Toulon	2013–14	Top 14	20	4	20	9 (Note: Appearances in the 2013–14 Heineken Cup)	1	5	29	5	25
Toulon	2014–15	Top 14	24	9	45	6 (Note: Appearances in the European Champions Cup)	2	10	30	11	55
Toulon	2015–16	Top 14	10	6	30	3 (Note: Appearances in the European Champions Cup)	1	5	13	7	35
Toulon	2016–17	Top 14	14	1	5	1 (Note: Appearance in the European Champions Cup)	0	0	15	1	5
Toulon	Total		68	20	100	19	4	20	87	24	120
Career total			180	55	275	20	4	20	200	59	295

=== International ===
As of 10 September 2017.

Statistics by team and year
Team	Year	Statistic		
Team	Year	Apps	Tries	Points
Australia A	2008	3	3	15
Australia	2005	10	6	30
Australia	2007	11	8	40
Australia	2008	8	3	15
Australia	2009	12	1	5
Australia	2010	14	9	45
Australia	2011	3	3	15
Australia	2012	5	0	0
Australia	2015	7	4	20
Australia	2016	1	0	0
Total		71	34	170

=== International tries ===
List of international tries scored by Drew Mitchell
No.	Opponent	Location	Competition	Date	Result	Ref.
1	South Africa	Stadium Australia, Sydney Olympic Park	2005 June Tests	9 July 2005	30–12	
2	New Zealand	Stadium Australia, Sydney Olympic Park	2005 Tri Nations Series	13 August 2005	13–30	
3	France	Stade Vélodrome, Marseille	2005 Autumn Internationals	5 November 2005	16–26	
4	England	Twickenham Stadium, London	2005 Autumn Internationals	12 November 2005	16–26	
5	Ireland	Lansdowne Road, Dublin	2005 Autumn Internationals	19 November 2005	30–14	
6	Ireland	Lansdowne Road, Dublin	2005 Autumn Internationals	19 November 2005	30–14	
7	Wales	Lang Park, Brisbane	2007 Wales tour of Australia	2 June 2007	31–0	
8	Japan	Stade de Gerland, Lyon	2007 Rugby World Cup	8 September 2007	91–3	
9	Japan	Stade de Gerland, Lyon	2007 Rugby World Cup	8 September 2007	91–3	
10	Fiji	Stade de la Mosson, Montpellier	2007 Rugby World Cup	23 September 2007	55–12	
11	Fiji	Stade de la Mosson, Montpellier	2007 Rugby World Cup	23 September 2007	55–12	
12	Fiji	Stade de la Mosson, Montpellier	2007 Rugby World Cup	23 September 2007	55–12	
13	Canada	Stade Chaban-Delmas, Bordeaux	2007 Rugby World Cup	29 September 2007	37–6	
14	Canada	Stade Chaban-Delmas, Bordeaux	2007 Rugby World Cup	29 September 2007	37–6	
15	South Africa	Ellis Park Stadium, Johannesburg	2008 Tri Nations Series	30 August 2008	8–53	
16	New Zealand	Hong Kong Stadium, Hong Kong	2008 Autumn Internationals	1 November 2008	14–19	
17	New Zealand	Hong Kong Stadium, Hong Kong	2008 Autumn Internationals	1 November 2008	14–19	
18	Ireland	Croke Park, Dublin	2009 Autumn Internationals	15 November 2009	20–20	
19	Fiji	Canberra Stadium, Canberra	2010 June Tests	5 June 2010	49–3	
20	South Africa	Lang Park, Brisbane	2010 Tri Nations Series	24 July 2010	30–13	
21	New Zealand	Docklands Stadium, Melbourne	2010 Tri Nations Series	31 July 2010	28–49	
22	South Africa	Free State Stadium, Bloemfontein	2010 Tri Nations Series	4 September 2010	41–39	
23	New Zealand	Hong Kong Stadium, Hong Kong	2010 Autumn Internationals	30 October 2010	26–24	
24	Italy	Stadio Artemio Franchi, Florence	2010 Autumn Internationals	20 November 2010	32–14	
25	France	Stade de France, Saint-Denis	2010 Autumn Internationals	27 November 2010	59–16	
26	France	Stade de France, Saint-Denis	2010 Autumn Internationals	27 November 2010	59–16	
27	France	Stade de France, Saint-Denis	2010 Autumn Internationals	27 November 2010	59–16	
28	United States	Wellington Regional Stadium, Wellington	2011 Rugby World Cup	23 September 2011	67–5	
29	Russia	Trafalgar Park, Nelson	2011 Rugby World Cup	1 October 2011	68–22	
30	Russia	Trafalgar Park, Nelson	2011 Rugby World Cup	1 October 2011	68–22	
31	Uruguay	Villa Park, Birmingham	2015 Rugby World Cup	27 September 2015	65–3	
32	Uruguay	Villa Park, Birmingham	2015 Rugby World Cup	27 September 2015	65–3	
33	Scotland	Twickenham Stadium, London	2015 Rugby World Cup	18 October 2015	35–34	
34	Scotland	Twickenham Stadium, London	2015 Rugby World Cup	18 October 2015	35–34	

== Awards and honours ==
Toulon

- Top 14: 2013–14
- European Champions Cup: 2014, 2015

Australia

- Rugby World Cup: 2015 (runners-up)
- The Rugby Championship: 2015

Individual

- Australian Super Rugby Rookie of the Year: 2005
