= Sekope Kepu =

Australia international rugby union player

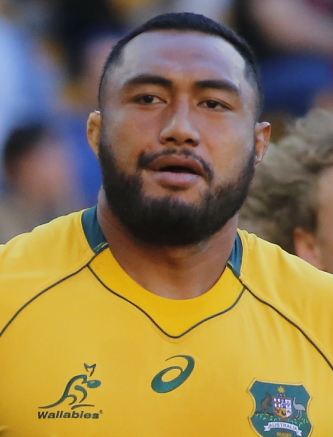
- Kepu playing for the Wallabies against Italy, 24 June 2017
- Born: Sekope Miami Kepu; 5 February 1986 (age 40) Sydney, New South Wales, Australia
- Height: 188 cm (6 ft 2 in)
- Weight: 125 kg (276 lb; 19 st 10 lb)

Rugby union career
- Position: Tighthead Prop
Senior career
| Years | Team | Apps | (Points) |
| 2015–2016 | Bordeaux | 19 | (5) |
| 2018 | NSW Country Eagles | 1 | (0) |
| 2019–2021 | London Irish | 16 | (0) |
Provincial / State sides
| Years | Team | Apps | (Points) |
| 2006–2007, 2021 | Counties Manukau | 9 | (0) |
Super Rugby
| Years | Team | Apps | (Points) |
| 2008–2019 | Waratahs | 141 | (25) |
| 2022–2024 | Moana Pasifika | 22 | (10) |
- Correct as of 28 June 2026
International career
| Years | Team | Apps | (Points) |
| 2003 | New Zealand U17 | | |
| 2004–2005 | New Zealand U19 | | |
| 2006 | New Zealand U21 | | |
| 2008 | Australia A | | |
| 2008–2019 | Australia | 110 | (20) |
- Correct as of 20 March 2022
Medal record
Men's rugby union
Representing Australia
Rugby World Cup
| Silver medal – second place | 2015 England | Squad |
| Bronze medal – third place | 2011 New Zealand | Squad |

Sekope Kepu (born 5 February 1986) is an Australian former professional rugby union player who played prop. He last played for Moana Pasifika in Super Rugby in 2024. He had previously played for Australian club the New South Wales Waratahs, French club Bordeaux, and English side London Irish, as well as the Australia national team. Kepu made his international debut for Australia in 2008 and became a regular squad member, earning over 100 caps in his international career.

== Early life ==
Kepu was born in Sydney, Australia, to Tongan parents, but his family relocated to Auckland, New Zealand while he was still a youngster. He began playing rugby with Tamaki Rugby Football Club Under 7s and attended school in the Auckland suburb Glen Innes.

Kepu captained the Wesley College first XV from the number eight position in 2004 before switching to the front row with the New Zealand under-19s in 2005. He represented New Zealand at under 17, 19 and 21 levels.

== Rugby Union career ==
Between 2005 and 2007, Kepu was a member of the wider training group for the Chiefs, and was a standout player for Counties Manukau in the Air New Zealand Cup in 2006. A broken collarbone ended his 2007 season and saw him end the year without a Super 14 contract.

Kepu moved back to Sydney at the age of 21 to play for the NSW Waratahs. He made his Super Rugby debut on 1 March 2008 against the Highlanders in Dunedin, playing as the starting loosehead after Wallabies prop Al Baxter was ruled out due to a head knock.

In June 2008, Kepu played for Australia A in the 2008 Pacific Nations Cup. He was selected for the Wallabies on the 2008 and 2009 Spring tours, and made his test debut on 8 November 2008, against Italy at Padova. He gained two more test caps from the bench on those tours but then waited for more than a year to make another test appearance.

Kepu had a strong season at the Waratahs in 2011 with 13 Super Rugby appearances, including 12 starts.

In the 2011 Tri Nations Series, Kepu became the first choice loosehead prop for the Wallabies after Benn Robinson was ruled out of the entire campaign due to a knee injury. Kepu started in all four tests and cemented his position. Australia won the 2011 Tri Nations cup.

Kepu was a key player for Australia at the 2011 Rugby World Cup, starting in six of the seven matches that the Wallabies played.

In March 2013, he re-signed with Australian Rugby to commit to the Wallabies and Waratahs for a further two years. Since then, Kepu has played at tighthead rather than loosehead prop for the Wallabies. Kepu's re-signing led to him starting in all three knockout rounds of the 2015 Rugby World Cup, but he was ill-disciplined in the final against New Zealand, on 31 October 2015, which Australia lost 17–34.

Kepu's third Super Rugby try against the Chiefs in round 15 of 2017 was well received by the press. He had an excellent 2017 season, being one of the best-performing Wallabies of the year. During his 90th test, Kepu ended the season being red-carded against Scotland on 25 November 2017. In the 39th minute of the test, he shoulder-charged Scottish flanker Hamish Watson's head, with Australia leading 12–10 at the time. Australia failed to perform well with Kepu off the field, losing 53–24. Kepu became the second Wallaby to be sent off in that decade, teammate Tevita Kuridrani having been sent off in 2013.

In October 2018, Kepu became the first prop to make 100 appearances for Australia, appearing against New Zealand in a 37–20 loss.

On 6 May 2019, it was announced that he had signed for London Irish in the Gallagher Premiership. On 8 February 2021 it was confirmed that he had left the club for personal reasons.

Kepu played for Counties Manukau in the 2021 NPC, and captained Moana Pasifika for the 2022 Super Rugby Pacific Competition.

In May 2024, Kepu announced his retirement from professional rugby.
