= Victor Vito (rugby union) =

Rugby player

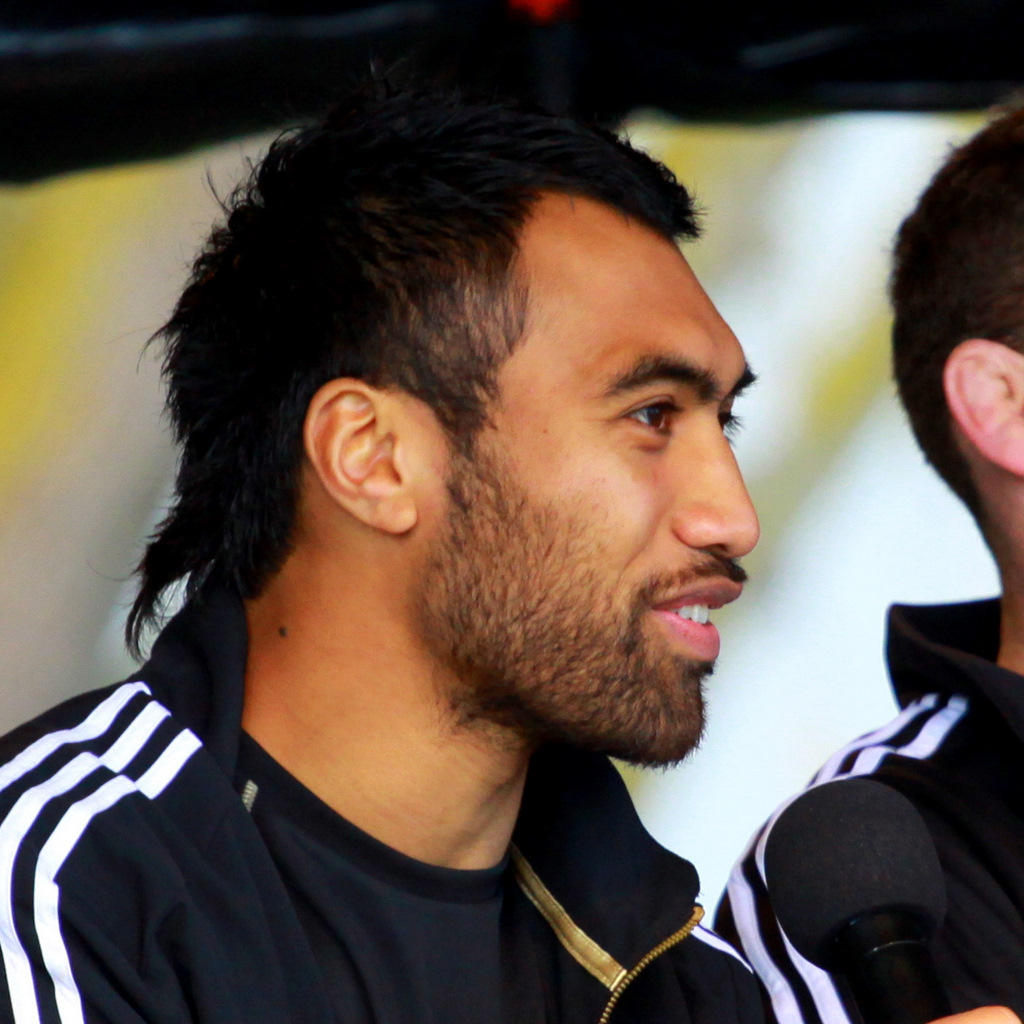
- Born: Victor Vasefanua Junior Vito; 27 March 1987 (age 39) Wellington, New Zealand
- Height: 1.92 m (6 ft 3 1/2 in)
- Weight: 112 kg (17 st 9 lb)
- School: Scots College, Wellington

Rugby union career
- Position: Loose forward
- Current team: La Rochelle
Amateur team(s)
Years	Team	Apps	(Points)
- Marist St Pats
Senior career
Years	Team	Apps	(Points)
2016–2022	La Rochelle	134	(80)
- Correct as of 12 August 2022
Provincial / State sides
Years	Team	Apps	(Points)
2006–2015	Wellington	62	(50)
- Correct as of 23 October 2015
Super Rugby
Years	Team	Apps	(Points)
2009–2016	Hurricanes	100	(60)
- Correct as of 6 August 2016
International career
Years	Team	Apps	(Points)
2006	New Zealand U19		
2007	New Zealand U21		
2010–2015	New Zealand	33	(20)
- Correct as of 31 October 2015

Victor Vasefanua Junior Vito (born 27 March 1987) is a retired New Zealand rugby player and All Black who last played blindside flanker for French team La Rochelle. He was a star of New Zealand Sevens, and captained the 2006 New Zealand Under 19 Rugby team. Also in 2006 Vito was nominated for the IRB Under 19 Player of the Year Award. He was a key member of 2011 and 2015 Rugby World Cup winning teams, becoming one of only 44 players who have won the Rugby World Cup on multiple occasions.

Vito attended the Wellington private school, Scots College, where he played for the 1st XV and was a boarder.

While playing rugby in New Zealand, Vito was a member of amateur rugby Marist St Pats in Wellington, and was a prominent player in the 2009 Wellington Lions. In 2010 he started for the Hurricanes Super 14 team and was named in the All Blacks extended squad for the first tests of the year.

During an interview with the ZM FM Morning Crew, Vito described his new position in the All Blacks as "a really really awesome promotion."

Vito was a colour commentator for Sky Network Television at the 2010 Wellington Sevens. During the tournament he revealed he was a fan of NFL side Tampa Bay Buccaneers and regarded Ronde Barber as a personal idol of his.

In 2010, he was bestowed the matai title of Leaupepetele in the village of Fasito'outa. Vito was in the All Blacks camp, preparing for his test debut off the bench against Ireland, when his mother Luma'ava Leaupepe-Timoteo returned to their village in Samoa to accept the passing of the title.

It is one of Samoa's highest honours, and was bestowed by Leaupepe Tele to the eldest sons of his respective children: Vito and three of his cousins.

"My grandfather holds the highest title in Fasito'o Uta and he's getting on now and he needed to pass it on to keep the name in the family," Vito explained.

Vito, despite inexperience compared to other players was selected for the 2011 Rugby World Cup over Liam Messam, and was again selected for the 2015 Rugby World Cup where he played as a substitute for the knockout stages, becoming one of only 20 players to have been part of multiple World Cup-winning sides.

His last appearance for the All Blacks was the game against Australia at Twickenham on 31 October 2015, where the All Blacks won the Webb Ellis Cup for the third time and first consecutive time. Vito announced his move to La Rochelle in France after the final, meaning his 2016 Super Rugby campaign would be his last.

In the final of the 2016 Super Rugby final Vito played in his 100th and final game for the Hurricanes. The Hurricanes won the title, beating the Lions from South Africa.

Vito currently plays for Top 14 Rugby Team Stade Rochelais where he won the French Top 14 Player of the Year award in 2017. He was also a nominee for EPCR European Player of The Year in 2018, helping his team to their first Champions cup season and Quarter-Final playoff.

== Teams ==
- La Rochelle (2016–present)
- New Zealand All Blacks (2010–2015)
- Hurricanes (2009–2016)
- Wellington Lions (2006–2016)
- New Zealand National Sevens Team (2007, 2008)
- New Zealand U21 Team (2007)
- New Zealand U19 Team (2006)
- New Zealand Secondary Schools (2004)
