= Kane Douglas =

Australia international rugby union player

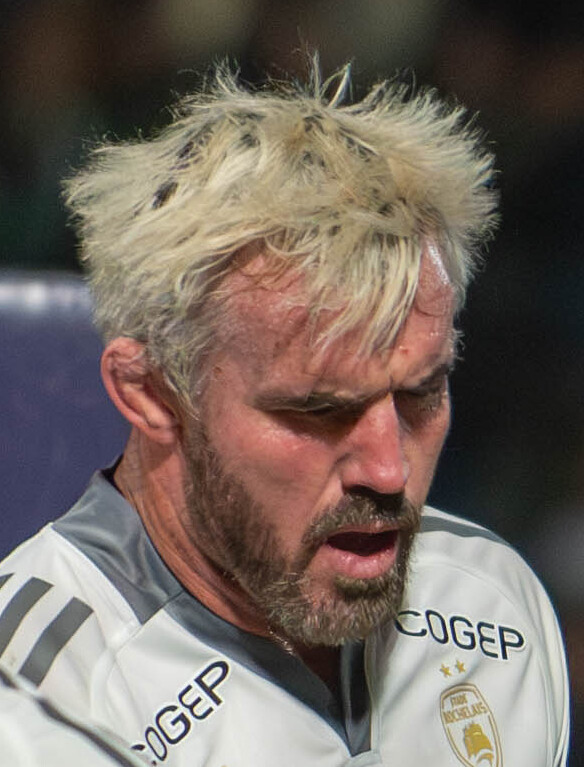
- Douglas in 2025
- Born: Kane P. Douglas; 1 June 1989 (age 37) Maclean, New South Wales, Australia
- Height: 2.02 m (6 ft 7 1/2 in)
- Weight: 123 kg (271 lb; 19 st 5 lb)
- School: Maclean High School
- Notable relative: Luke Douglas (brother)

Rugby union career
- Position: Lock
Amateur team(s)
Years	Team	Apps	(Points)
2012	Yamba Buccaneers		
2012–2014	Southern Districts	15	(0)
Senior career
Years	Team	Apps	(Points)
2014	NSW Country Eagles	1	(0)
2014–2015	Leinster	20	(0)
2016–2018	Brisbane City	6	(0)
2018–2024	Bordeaux	145	(10)
2024–	La Rochelle	20	(5)
- Correct as of 25 May 2025
Super Rugby
Years	Team	Apps	(Points)
2010–2014	Waratahs	76	(10)
2015–2018	Reds	29	(0)
- Correct as of 21 July 2016
International career
Years	Team	Apps	(Points)
2012–2018	Australia	31	(0)
- Correct as of 26 November 2016
Medal record
Men's rugby union
Representing Australia
Rugby World Cup
Silver medal – second place	2015 England	Squad

Kane Douglas (born 1 June 1989) is a former Australian professional rugby union footballer who most currently played as a lock for La Rochelle in Top 14.

Douglas previously played a season with Irish province Leinster, as well as eight seasons in Super Rugby for New South Wales and Queensland. He represented Australia in international rugby, including at the 2015 Rugby World Cup.

Kane Douglas is the middle brother of three sons born to Christopher and Patricia (Trish) Douglas. His older brother, Luke Douglas is an Australian-born Scotland rugby league footballer. Younger brother Jake plays in England for the Yorkshire side Driffield RUFC.

Kane Douglas played his junior rugby with the Yamba Buccaneers, captaining the Under 17 team to a premiership in 2006.

In 2008, Douglas was selected to train with the NSW Waratahs Academy under the guidance of Head Coach Joe Barakat. He was promoted to Junior Waratahs professional squad in 2009 making his debut for the Waratahs against the Queensland Reds in 2010 off the bench. He immediately forced his way into the starting side and has missed just four games since, two of those due to the suspension.

Douglas was named to debut for Australia against Argentina at the Gold Coast, where he gained his first Australian Wallabies cap on 17 September 2012.

On 20 May 20, 2014, Leinster confirmed signing Douglas for the 2014–15 season. He played his first game for Leinster v Cardiff Blues on Friday 26 September 2014.

On 31 July 2015, Douglas returned to Australia to sign for Super Rugby side Queensland Reds on a three-year deal from the 2015 season onwards.

Douglas would return to France with Top 14 side Bordeaux from the 2018–19 season. On 19 August 2024, Douglas would sign for French rivals La Rochelle from the 2024–25 season.
