= Greg Holmes (rugby union) =

- Born: Gregory Holmes; 11 June 1983 (age 43) Warwick, Queensland, Australia
- Height: 1.83 m (6 ft 0 in)
- Weight: 114 kg (251 lb; 17 st 13 lb)
- School: Downlands College

Rugby union career
- Position: Prop
Senior career
Years	Team	Apps	(Points)
2005−2016	Sunnybank	27	(20)
2007	Ballymore Tornadoes	2	(0)
2014−15	Queensland Country	4	(0)
2016−2020	Exeter Chiefs	43	(10)
2020	Western Force		
- Correct as of 1 July 2020
Super Rugby
Years	Team	Apps	(Points)
2005–2016	Reds	144	(35)
2020−2022	Force	20	(0)
- Correct as of 23 March 2022
International career
Years	Team	Apps	(Points)
2005–2021	Australia	28	(10)
Medal record
Men's rugby union
Representing Australia
Rugby World Cup
Silver medal – second place	2015 England	Squad

Greg Holmes (born 11 June 1983) is an Australian former rugby union footballer. He played for the Western Force in the Super Rugby and the Australia national rugby union team. His position was prop, and played either side of the scrum.

== Career ==
Holmes made his Super 12 debut for the Reds in 2005 playing the Auckland Blues in Auckland. After having a strong debut season, Holmes found himself getting a callup to the Wallabies squad to tour Europe. He made his Australian debut against France in Marseille. Holmes came off the bench in Australia's loss to England at Twickenham, where the English overpowered the Wallabies with their scrummaging. He was included in John Connolly's Wallabies side to face England at Telstra Stadium. In the return match against the English, Australia won 34 to 3. In 2006, Holmes scored a remarkable try against the Irish, running over 60 metres to touch down. He also scored in Australia's 49–0 victory over South Africa, this time scoring a try more akin to a prop by smashing through three South African would-be tacklers. In 2011, Holmes was included in Wallabies squad.

Holmes announced on 21 December 2015 that he would be calling time on his Wallabies career and joining Aviva Premiership side Exeter Chiefs for the 2016/17 season on a two-year deal.

He later signed for the Western Force ahead of the 2020 Super Rugby AU season before being recalled to the national squad for a Test against Argentina in the 2021 Rugby Championship at the age of 38, making him the oldest Wallaby to make the side since World War II.
