= Ben McCalman =

Australian rugby union player (born 1988)

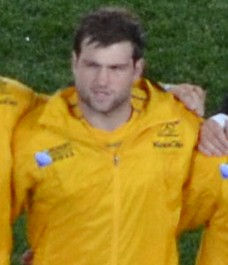
- McCalman at the 2011 Rugby World Cup
- Born: Benjamin McCalman; 18 March 1988 (age 38) Dubbo, New South Wales, Australia
- Height: 192 cm (6 ft 4 in)
- Weight: 106 kg (16 st 10 lb)
- School: Kinross Wolaroi
- University: Sydney University

Rugby union career
- Position: Lock / Loose forward
Senior career
Years	Team	Apps	(Points)
2014	Perth Spirit	11	(25)
2015−2016	Panasonic Wild Knights	9	(25)
- Correct as of 21 July 2014
Super Rugby
Years	Team	Apps	(Points)
2010–2017	Force	91	(55)
- Correct as of 20 July 2016
International career
Years	Team	Apps	(Points)
2010–2017	Australia	53	(20)
- Correct as of 25 November 2017
Medal record
Men's Rugby union
Representing Australia
Rugby World Cup
Silver medal – second place	2015 England	Squad
Bronze medal – third place	2011 New Zealand	Squad

Ben McCalman (born 18 March 1988 in Dubbo, New South Wales) is a former Australian rugby union footballer, playing for the Western Force in the international Super Rugby competition, and Australia.

McCalman attended the Kinross Wolaroi School in Orange. In 2005 and 2006 he made the Australian Schools selection. McCalman then furthered his education at Sydney University. He made his Western Force and Wallabies debuts in 2010 and was a part of the Australian 2011 Rugby World Cup campaign.

In 2015, McCalman signed a three-year flexible contract with the Australian Rugby Union, becoming just the second player to sign a flexible contract. The new deal allows him to play the 2015–16 season in Japan's Top League, whilst remaining with the Western Force until the end of the 2018 season.

== Super Rugby statistics ==
As of 20 July 2016

Season	Team	Games	Starts	Sub	Mins	Tries	Cons	Pens	Drops	Points	Yel	Red
2010	Force	13	8	5	716	0	0	0	0	0	0	0
2011	Force	16	14	2	1170	1	0	0	0	5	0	0
2012	Force	8	5	3	358	1	0	0	0	5	0	0
2013	Force	14	11	3	794	2	0	0	0	10	0	0
2014	Force	14	14	0	1066	4	0	0	0	20	1	0
2015	Force	15	15	0	1152	1	0	0	0	5	0	0
2016	Force	11	9	2	632	2	0	0	0	10	0	0
Total		91	76	15	5888	11	0	0	0	55	1	0
