= Rob Simmons (rugby union) =

Australia international rugby union player

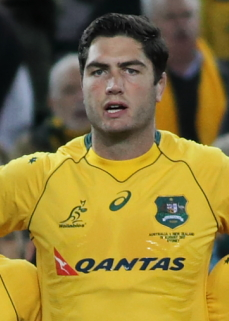
- Born: Robert A. Simmons; 19 April 1989 (age 37) Theodore, Queensland, Australia
- Height: 200 cm (6 ft 7 in)
- Weight: 115 kg (18 st 2 lb; 254 lb)
- School: The Southport School

Rugby union career
- Position(s): Lock, Flanker
Amateur team(s)
Years	Team	Apps	(Points)
2007–2010	Sunnybank		
Senior career
Years	Team	Apps	(Points)
2007	East Coast Aces	2	(0)
2014	Queensland Country	3	(6)
2018	Sydney Rays	2	(0)
2020–2023	London Irish	65	(5)
2023–2026	Clermont Auvergne	68	(20)
- Correct as of 31 May 2026
Super Rugby
Years	Team	Apps	(Points)
2008–2017	Reds	114	(20)
2018–2020	Waratahs	43	(15)
- Correct as of 29 August 2020
International career
Years	Team	Apps	(Points)
2010–2020	Australia	105	(15)
2008	Australia U20		
2007	Australia U19		
2006	Australian Schoolboys	3	
- Correct as of 5 December 2020
Medal record
Men's rugby union
Representing Australia
Rugby World Cup
Silver medal – second place	2015 England	Squad
Bronze medal – third place	2011 New Zealand	Squad

Rob Simmons (born 19 April 1989) is an Australian rugby union footballer. He last played for Clermont in the Top 14 in France. He represented Australia in international fixtures from 2010 to 2020. His position is lock, but he can also play in the back row.

== Early life ==
Simmons was born in Theodore, Queensland. He attended The Southport School, on the Gold Coast in Queensland, and played for the Australian Schoolboys team in 2006.

Simmons was selected for the Australian U19s representative side in 2007. He played for the Australian Under 20 side at the 2008 IRB Junior World Cup in Wales.

== Career ==
In 2007, Simmons played for the East Coast Aces in the inaugural Australian Rugby Championship. He made his Super Rugby debut for the Queensland Reds in South Africa off the bench against the Bulls at the beginning of the 2009 season.

Simmons made his test rugby debut for Australia in 2010, playing against South Africa in Brisbane.

Simmons scored with a 2nd minute intercept try in Australia's Rugby World Cup 2015 Semi-final win over Argentina. This was the fastest try of the 2015 Rugby World Cup.

On 16 January 2015, Simmons, along with teammate Karmichael Hunt, were appointed vice-captains of the Queensland Reds.

In late 2017, Simmons was axed by the Queensland Reds after playing almost ten years of rugby in Queensland.

In early 2018, Simmons left the Queensland Reds and joined fellow Australian Super Rugby team, the New South Wales Waratahs.

In July 2020, it was announced that Simmons would join English Premiership Rugby side London Irish ahead of the 2020–21 season.

In March 2023, Simmons signed a two-year contract with Clermont in the Top 14, with the deal starting in the 2023–2024 season.
