= 2015 Rugby World Cup =

Rugby Union tournament

- Too Big To Miss.

Tournament details
- Host nation: England
- Venue: 13 (in 11 host cities)
- Dates: 18 September – 31 October (44 days)
- No. of nations: 20 (96 qualifying)

Final positions
- Champions: New Zealand (3rd title)
- Runner-up: Australia
- Third place: South Africa

Tournament statistics
- Matches played: 48
- Attendance: 2,477,805 (51,621 per match)
- Top scorer(s): (Argentina) Nicolás Sánchez (97)
- Most tries: (New Zealand) Julian Savea (8)

The 2015 Rugby World Cup was the eighth Rugby World Cup, the quadrennial rugby union world championship. The tournament was hosted by England (Note: Although England, with its governing body the Rugby Football Union, was officially the sole "host nation" of the tournament, 8 matches were played in Cardiff, Wales.) from 18 September to 31 October. Of the 20 countries competing in the World Cup in 2011, there was only one change: Uruguay replaced Russia. This was the first men's Rugby World Cup with no new teams to the tournament.

Reigning champions The All Blacks won the cup and defended their title by defeating Australia 34–17 in the final; South Africa defeated Argentina to take third place. This was the first Rugby World Cup where no Northern Hemisphere team got beyond the quarter-finals. New Zealand were the first team to retain their title and the first to win for a third time.

The highly contested match between Japan and South Africa on the opening weekend, in which Japan scored the winning try in the final minute, was widely considered the biggest upset in the history of international rugby. Hosts England were eliminated at the pool stage, after defeats by Wales and Australia; this was the first time the knockout stage did not feature a host nation.

== Host selection ==
=== Submission of interest ===
The International Rugby Board (IRB) requested that any member unions wishing to host this tournament or the 2019 Rugby World Cup should indicate their interest by 15 August 2008. This would be purely to indicate interest; no details had to be provided at this stage. A record 10 unions indicated formal interest in hosting the 2015 and/or the 2019 events: Australia, England, Ireland, Italy, Jamaica, Japan, Russia, Scotland, South Africa and Wales. Argentina had been reported in early 2008 as having given preliminary consideration to bidding, but did not ultimately formally indicate an interest in bidding.

Of the 10 nations that had expressed formal interest, many withdrew their candidacy in early 2009. Jamaica was the first to withdraw its candidacy. Russia withdrew in February 2009 to concentrate on bidding for the 2013 Rugby World Cup Sevens, Australia and Ireland withdrew in spring 2009 due to financial reasons. Scotland withdrew in April 2009 after they were unable to secure co-hosting partners for the tournament. Wales was the last nation to officially pull out after they failed to submit a bid by 8 May 2009, but Wales backed England's bid and some games were played at Cardiff's Millennium Stadium.

=== Final bids ===
The final nations that bid for the right to host the 2015 Rugby World Cup were England, Japan, South Africa and Italy. Four confirmed bids was a record number for the Rugby World Cup.

On 28 July 2009, the IRB confirmed that England would host the 2015 Rugby World Cup, and Japan would host the 2019 event, having voted 16–10 in favour of approving the recommendation from Rugby World Cup Ltd (RWCL) that England and Japan should be named hosts. (Note: The IRB became World Rugby on 19 November 2014. However, the 2015 World Cup retained its IRB branding, given the proximity of the rebrand to the event, and as merchandise was already available with IRB branding at the time of the name change. The 2019 Rugby World Cup was the first to use full World Rugby branding.) RWCL chairman Bernard Lapasset revealed the result on 28 July 2009 at IRB headquarters.

==== England ====
In September 2007, The Guardian reported that the Rugby Football Union had decided to submit a bid. BBC News reported in February 2009 that the intent was for a solo bid from the RFU, but with the possibility of some matches being played in Scotland, Wales or Ireland. It was hoped that the 2015 World Cup would add to Britain's "Decade of Sport" (including the 2012 Summer Olympics, 2012 Summer Paralympics, 2013 Rugby League World Cup and 2014 Commonwealth Games).

It was also claimed that the bid had a very strong chance of success due to the IRB's belief that the 2011 tournament might make a loss, therefore making it particularly important to ensure a profit, which was considered a strong point of England's proposed bid. The chief executive of the Rugby Football Union, Francis Baron, said that the tournament would target sales of 3 million tickets. England's package was projected to generate £300 million for the IRB – £220 million in commercial returns from broadcasting, sponsorship and merchandising, and the £80 million tournament fee.

==== Italy ====
Italy stated its desire to host, and an Italian bid to host the Rugby World Cup in 2015 or 2019 was confirmed on 20 July 2008. Italy declared that it wanted to host "For the Enlargement of the Frontiers of Our Sport". It was a slogan relevant to the then-current landscape of World Cup rugby, given that 2007 was the first time that the Rugby World Cup was hosted by a primarily non-English-speaking country.

The Italian bid offered the largest cities and stadiums in the country and promised a fast domestic train system. The Italian Rugby Federation (FIR) also included the importance of the population and the growth of rugby since Italy joined the Six Nations in 2000 as reasons for hosting a World Cup. Rugby had been growing increasingly popular in Italy in recent years, with improved crowds at international matches.

The Stadio Olimpico in Rome had been proposed as the venue to host the final and the first match of the tournament. Milan and Naples were included as the other large venues. The entire list was a selection of large stadiums spread across the country. Stade Vélodrome in Marseille, France was also included as the tenth proposed venue.

==== Japan ====
The Japan Rugby Football Union officially submitted its tender to the IRB in May 2009. Japan was seen as a favourite to host after finishing as runner-up in the bidding for the 2011 event. Japan was seen as having a lot to offer rugby's growth in Asia. Its population of 127 million, its large economy, and its ability to place rugby before a new Asian audience made it a front-runner for hosting rights. Furthermore, rugby in Japan had developed a following, and with 126,000 registered players, Japan had more players than some of the Six Nations. Japan's Top League was a showcase for Japanese rugby, and there was excitement about Japan's entry into the RWC. Japan's experience in co-hosting the 2002 FIFA World Cup was also seen as a boost, with Japan already possessing the necessary stadiums and infrastructure.

==== South Africa ====
The South African Rugby Union (SARU) had confirmed its intent to bid for the 2015 tournament, and in May 2009 South Africa delivered its application to the IRB. South Africa had previously made an unsuccessful bid to host the 2011 RWC. The strengths of a South African bid would be that it is in the same time zone as Europe, the wealthiest television market from a rugby perspective, that South Africa were the current World Cup holders, that they had successfully hosted the 1995 Rugby World Cup, won the 2007 Rugby World Cup and that they were in the process of building large new stadiums for the then-upcoming 2010 FIFA World Cup.

== Venues ==
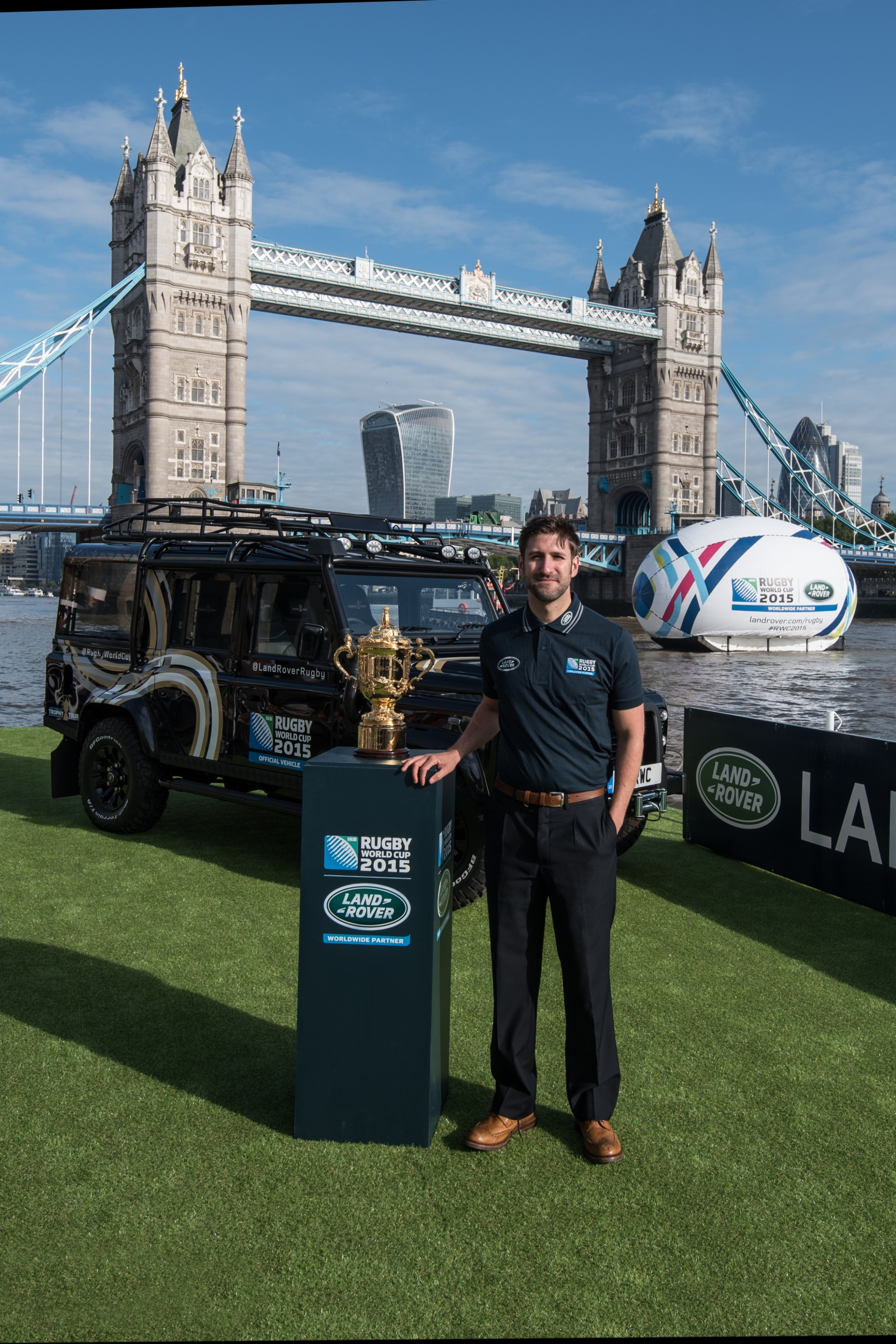
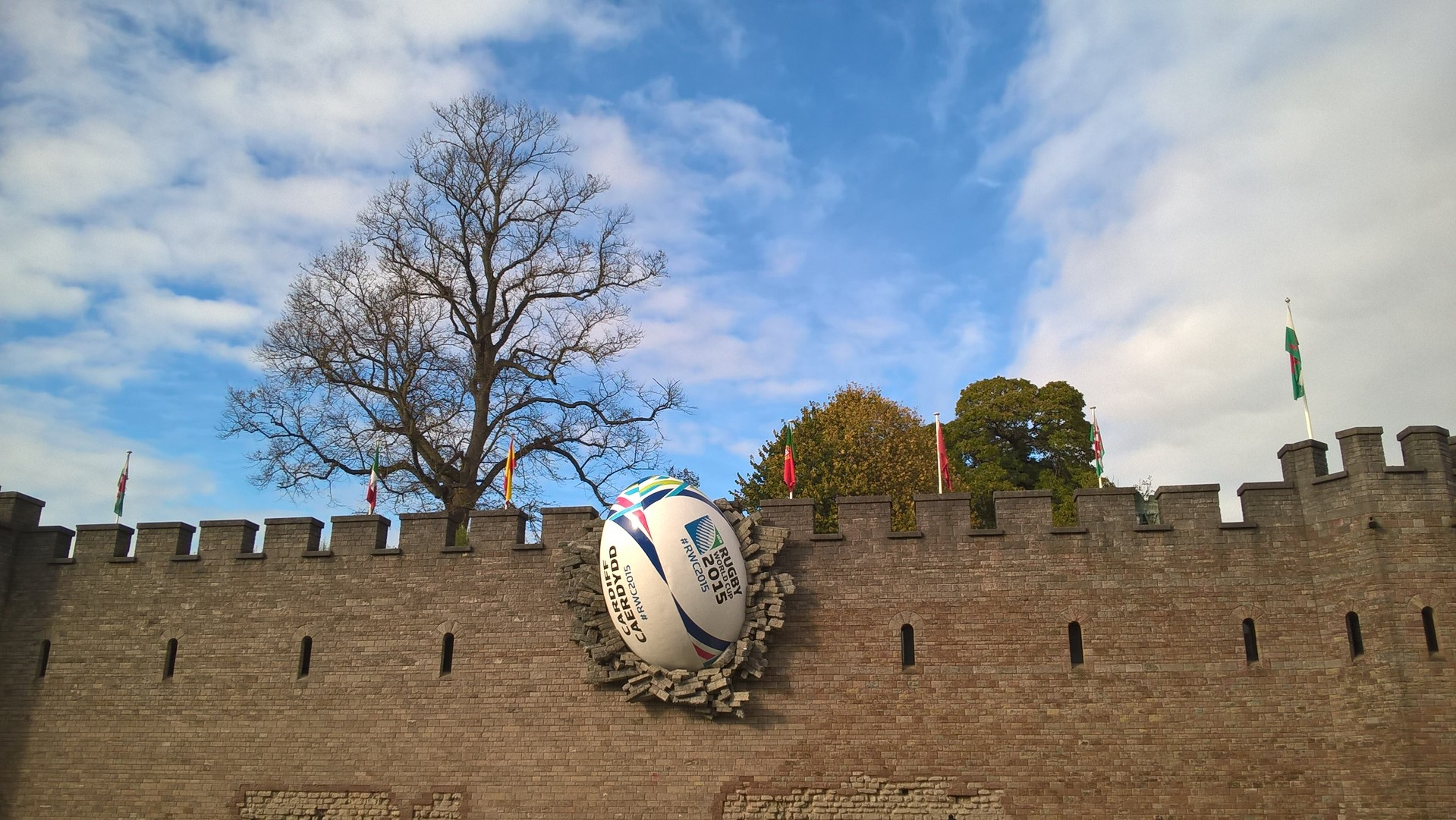
The Rugby World Cup ball in the host cities of London and Cardiff

After England were appointed tournament hosts on 28 July 2009, the proposed stadia for the tournament were revealed. The final venues were confirmed, along with the tournament's schedule, on 2 May 2013. Twelve of the stadia were located in England, while the Millennium Stadium located in neighbour Wales was also to be used. In 2011, the IRB approved the use of the Millennium Stadium, despite being outside of the host country, due to its capacity and strategic location. Of the thirteen venues, two were dedicated rugby union grounds (Kingsholm Stadium and Sandy Park), two were national rugby stadia (Twickenham and the Millennium Stadium), two were multi-purpose stadia (Wembley Stadium and the Olympic Stadium), and the remainder were association football grounds.

Proposed venues that did not make the final selection were the Stadium of Light in Sunderland, Coventry's Ricoh Arena, St Mary's Stadium in Southampton, Pride Park Stadium in Derby, Anfield in Liverpool and Bristol's Ashton Gate. In April 2013, Old Trafford was withdrawn from consideration by its owners, Manchester United F.C., citing commitments to hosting rugby league and its Super League Grand Final and concerns about pitch degradation. The RWCL then approached neighbouring Manchester City about leasing their home stadium as a replacement. City agreed to let their stadium be used for the tournament but only for one match due to footballing commitments – down from the original three which were to be played at Old Trafford. Etihad Stadium, as it was known for football sponsorship purposes, would be called 'Manchester City Stadium' by organisers for the duration of the tournament.

(England) London				(Wales) Cardiff
Wembley Stadium	Twickenham		Olympic Stadium	Millennium Stadium
Capacity: 90,000	Capacity: 82,000		Capacity: 56,000	Capacity: 74,154
(England) Newcastle	2015 Rugby World Cup (England)			(England) Manchester
St James' Park	2015 Rugby World Cup (England)			City of Manchester Stadium
Capacity: 52,409	2015 Rugby World Cup (England)			Capacity: 55,097
(England) Birmingham	2015 Rugby World Cup (England)			(England) Leeds
Villa Park	2015 Rugby World Cup (England)			Elland Road
Capacity: 42,785	2015 Rugby World Cup (England)			Capacity: 37,914
(England) Leicester	(England) Brighton	(England) Milton Keynes	(England) Gloucester	(England) Exeter
Leicester City Stadium	Brighton Community Stadium	Stadium MK	Kingsholm Stadium	Sandy Park
Capacity: 32,312	Capacity: 30,750	Capacity: 30,717	Capacity: 16,500	Capacity: 12,300

Source: The Telegraph

=== Team bases ===
The 41 venues that acted as bases for the teams were announced on 26 August 2014. All prospective team bases were subject to a rigorous selection process, which included a programme of detailed site visits as well as liaison with the competing teams. Each team base included an outdoor and indoor training facility, a swimming pool, gym and hotel and would be used by the competing teams in the lead up to and during the World Cup.

Team	Venue(s)
Argentina	St George's Park; Haileybury School; Cheltenham RFC (Cheltenham RFC, Leisure@, Gym 66)
Australia	Dulwich College; University of Bath
Canada	Leicester Grammar School; Cardiff Metropolitan University; Swansea University (Swansea University, Wales National Pool); West Park Leeds RUFC (West Park Leeds RUFC, John Charles Centre for Sport)
England	Pennyhill Park Hotel; Salford (AJ Bell Stadium, Irlam & Cadishead Leisure Centre)
Fiji	Swansea University (Swansea University, Wales National Pool); London Irish RFC (London Irish RFC, Elmbridge Xcel Leisure Complex); Milton Keynes & MK Dons (Woughton on the Green, Bletchley Leisure Centre)
France	The Vale Resort; Trinity School, Croydon
Georgia	Woodbury Park & Bicton College (Woodbury Park Hotel & Golf Club, Bicton College); Bristol & SGS Wise (South Gloucestershire & Stroud College, Bradley Stoke Leisure Centre); Celtic Manor Resort & Newport (Newport High School/Active Living Centre, The Celtic Academy)
Ireland	St George's Park; Surrey Sports Park; Sport Wales National Centre; Celtic Manor Resort & Newport (Newport High School/Active Living Centre, The Celtic Academy)
Italy	Surrey Sports Park; Cobham RFC (Cobham RFC, ACS Cobham)
Japan	Warwick School; Brighton College
Namibia	Loughborough University; Cobham RFC (Cobham RFC, ACS Cobham); Plymouth (St Mark & St John Uni., Plymouth RFC, Plymouth Life Centre & Royal Navy RU)
New Zealand	Sport Wales National Centre; The Lensbury & St Mary's University; Darlington Mowden Park RFC (Darlington Mowden Park RFC, Middlesbrough F.C.)
Romania	Dulwich College; Woodbury Park & Bicton College (Woodbury Park Hotel & Golf Club, Bicton College); Sutton Coldfield RFC (Sutton Coldfield RFC, Birmingham Met. College, Wyndley Leisure Centre, CrossFitB76)
Samoa	Milton Keynes & MK Dons (Woughton on the Green, Bletchley Leisure Centre); University of Brighton (University of Brighton, Prince Regent Swimming Complex); Gateshead (Gateshead International Stadium, Gateshead Leisure Centre, Gateshead College); Sutton Coldfield RFC (Sutton Coldfield RFC, Birmingham Met. College, Wyndley Leisure Centre, CrossFitB76)
Scotland	Hartpury College; Newcastle Royal Grammar School; Leeds Metropolitan University & University of Leeds
South Africa	University of Birmingham; The Lensbury & St Mary's University; Eastbourne College & University of Brighton; Gateshead (Gateshead International Stadium, Gateshead Leisure Centre, Gateshead College)
Tonga	University of Exeter; Loughborough University; University of Northumbria; Cheltenham RFC (Cheltenham RFC, Leisure@, Gym 66)
United States	Hartpury College; Haileybury School; Royal Navy Rugby Union; Leeds Trinity University (Leeds Trinity University, Kirkstall Leisure Centre)
Wales	The Vale Resort; London Irish RFC (London Irish RFC, Elmbridge Xcel Leisure Complex)
Uruguay	Moulton College; Loughborough University; Manchester (Broughton Park RUFC, The Hough End Centre, Manchester Aquatics Centre); Celtic Manor Resort & Newport (Newport High School/Active Living Centre, The Celtic Academy)
Knock-out phase	The Vale Resort; London Irish RFC; Surrey Sports Park; Swansea University; Pennyhill Park Hotel; Sport Wales National Centre; Celtic Manor Resort & Newport; The Lensbury & St Mary's University

== Qualifying ==
Of the 20 teams competing at the 2015 World Cup, 12 of them qualified by finishing in the top three places in their pools in the 2011 Rugby World Cup. The other eight teams qualified through regional competition. As the host nation, England qualified automatically. The qualification process for the remaining teams incorporated existing regional competitions such as the European Nations Cup.

=== Qualified teams ===
Twenty teams played in the final tournament. They are listed below, along with their pre-tournament positions in the World Rugby Rankings. The list of teams was the same as in the 2003 tournament.

Asia Rugby (1)

- Japan (13)

Rugby Africa (2)

- South Africa (3)
- Namibia (20)

Sudamérica Rugby (2)

- Argentina (8)
- Uruguay (19)

NACRA (2)

- Canada (18)
- United States (15)

Rugby Europe (8)

- England (4)
- France (7)
- Georgia (16)
- Ireland (6)
- Italy (14)
- Romania (17)
- Scotland (10)
- Wales (5)

Oceania Rugby (5)

- Australia (2)
- Fiji (9)
- New Zealand (1)
- Samoa (12)
- Tonga (11)

Country qualified for World Cup Country did not qualify Country not an IRB member

== Draw ==
Seedings for the pools of the 2015 World Cup were based on the teams' respective IRB Rankings. The draw, hosted by Will Greenwood, was conducted on 3 December 2012 in London, and used the World Rankings as of that day, just after the 2012 end-of-year rugby union internationals, which finished on 1 December 2012. The 12 automatic qualifiers from 2011 were allocated to their respective bands based on their rankings:

- Band 1, made up of the top 4 automatic qualifiers, (1–4)
- Band 2, made up of the next 4 automatic qualifiers, (5–8)
- Band 3, made up of the next 4 automatic qualifiers (9–12)

The remaining 8 qualifying places were allocated to Bands 4 and 5, based on previous World Cup playing strength;

- Band 4, made up of Oceania 1, Europe 1, Asia 1 and Americas 1
- Band 5, made up of Africa 1, Europe 2, Americas 2 and play-off winner

This meant the 20 teams, qualified and qualifiers, were seeded thus:

Pot 1
- New Zealand (1)
- South Africa (2)
- Australia (3)
- France (4)
Pot 2
- England (5)
- Ireland (6)
- Samoa (7)
- Argentina (8)
Pot 3
- Wales (9)
- Italy (10)
- Tonga (11)
- Scotland (12)
Pot 4
- Canada (Americas 1)
- Japan (Asia 1)
- Georgia (Europe 1)
- Fiji (Oceania 1)
Pot 5
- Namibia (Africa 1)
- United States (Americas 2)
- Romania (Europe 2)
- Uruguay (Repechage)

The draw saw a representative randomly draw a ball from a pot, the first drawn ball goes to Pool A, the second Pool B, the third Pool C and the fourth Pool D. The draw began with Pot 5, drawn by All Blacks captain Richie McCaw, followed by Pot 4, drawn by RWC 2015 Ambassador and English women's international Maggie Alphonsi, then Pot 3, drawn by Mayor of London Boris Johnson, Pot 2, drawn by the then Chief Executive for RWC 2015 Debbie Jevans, and finally Pot 1, drawn by IRB chairman Bernard Lapasset.

=== Draw criticism ===
The timing of the draw drew criticism due to the long period between the draw occurring and the commencement of the tournament – three years. Indeed, by the time of the pool match between England and Wales on 26 September, pool A contained the 2nd, 3rd and 4th (Australia, England and Wales) ranked teams in the world. Following England's elimination at the pool stage after defeats by Australia and Wales, Wales coach Warren Gatland noted that "Everyone is making a thing about the first home country to hold a World Cup to miss out on the quarter-finals, but the stupid thing, as we all know, is why was the World Cup draw done three years ago? That's just ridiculous as far as I am concerned. If they had followed the football model, then we wouldn't be in this position. There are other people outside this who need to have a look at themselves and why those decisions were made, and you have got to feel sorry for the people involved and who this has affected". The chief executive of World Rugby Brett Gosper subsequently acknowledged criticisms, saying "We'll look at that next time to see if it's possible to make the draw closer to the tournament".

== Squads ==
Each country was allowed a squad of 31 players for the tournament. These squads were to be submitted to World Rugby by a deadline of 31 August 2015. Once the squad was submitted, a player could be replaced if injured, but would not be allowed to return to the squad. There was also a stand-down period of 48 hours before the new player was allowed to take the field. Hence, a replacement player called into a squad on the eve of a game would not be permitted to play in that game.

== Opening ceremony ==
The opening ceremony of the 2015 Rugby World Cup took place at Twickenham Stadium in London on 18 September 2015 at 19:20 (BST). The ceremony told the legend of how William Webb Ellis created the sport of rugby union, and featured the choir of Rugby School singing "Swing Low, Sweet Chariot", an anthem of rugby union in England. All the participating teams were represented by a former player in the ceremony; the host nation, England, was represented by World Cup-winning captain Martin Johnson. The ceremony was directed by Kim Gavin, who was also responsible for directing the closing ceremonies of both the 2012 Summer Olympics and the 2012 Summer Paralympics. Prince Harry, Duke of Sussex, who had an acting part previously in the ceremony, declared the tournament officially open, ending his speech with the words, "We're ready. Game on." British Prime Minister David Cameron said on social media that the 2015 Rugby World Cup would be the best ever.

== Pool stage ==
The first round, or pool stage, saw the 20 teams divided into four pools of five teams, using the same format that was used in 2003, 2007, and 2011. Each pool was a single round-robin of ten games, in which each team played one match against each of the other teams in the same pool. Teams were awarded four points for a win, two points for a draw and none for a defeat. A team scoring four tries in one match scored a bonus point, as did a team that lost by fewer than eight points.

Pool A	Pool B	Pool C	Pool D
Australia; England; Wales; Fiji; Uruguay	South Africa; Samoa; Scotland; Japan; United States	New Zealand; Argentina; Tonga; Georgia; Namibia	France; Ireland; Italy; Canada; Romania

The teams finishing in the top two of each pool would advance to the quarter-finals. The top three teams of each pool received automatic qualification to the 2019 Rugby World Cup (Japan had already automatically qualified as hosts).

Tie-breaking criteria

If two or more teams were tied on match points, the following tiebreakers would apply:

1. The winner of the match between the two teams;
2. Difference between points scored for and points scored against in all pool matches;
3. Difference between tries scored for and tries scored against in all pool matches;
4. Points scored in all pool matches;
5. Most tries scored in all pool matches;
6. Official World Rugby Rankings as of 12 October 2015.

If three teams were tied on points, the above criteria would be used to decide first place in the Pool, and then the criteria would be used again (starting from criteria 1) to decide second place in the Pool.

Key to colours in pool tables
Advanced to the quarter-finals and qualified for the 2019 Men's Rugby World Cup
Eliminated but qualified for 2019 Men's Rugby World Cup

=== Pool A ===
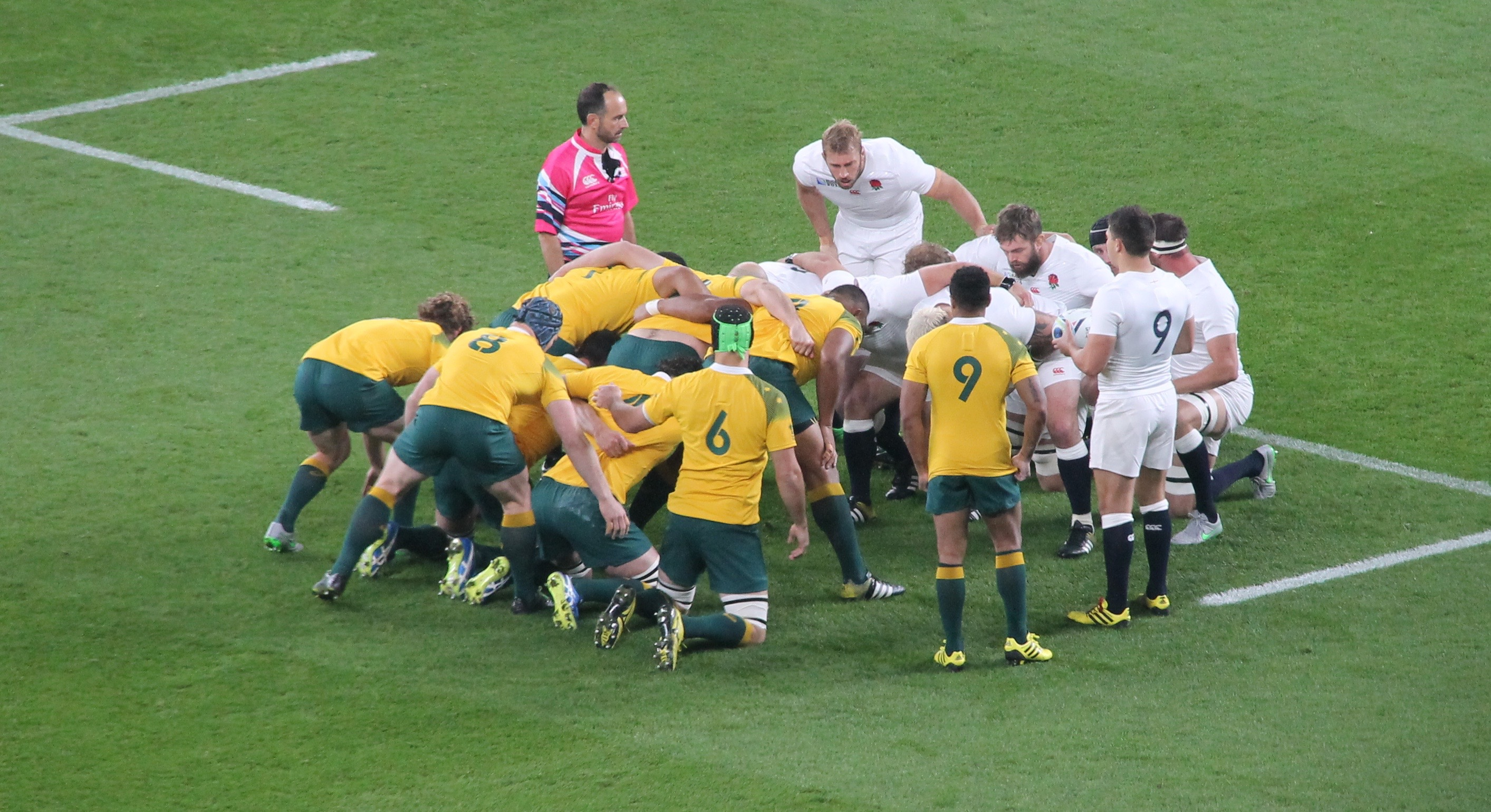
Australia beat England 33–13 at Twickenham Stadium in London.

Pos	Team	Pld	W	D	L	PF	PA	PD	T	B	Pts
1	Australia	4	4	0	0	141	35	+106	17	1	17
2	Wales	4	3	0	1	111	62	+49	11	1	13
3	England	4	2	0	2	133	75	+58	16	3	11
4	Fiji	4	1	0	3	84	101	−17	10	1	5
5	Uruguay	4	0	0	4	30	226	−196	2	0	0

18 September 2015	England	35–11	Fiji	Twickenham Stadium, London
20 September 2015	Wales	54–9	Uruguay	Millennium Stadium, Cardiff
23 September 2015	Australia	28–13	Fiji	Millennium Stadium, Cardiff
26 September 2015	England	25–28	Wales	Twickenham Stadium, London
27 September 2015	Australia	65–3	Uruguay	Villa Park, Birmingham
1 October 2015	Wales	23–13	Fiji	Millennium Stadium, Cardiff
3 October 2015	England	13–33	Australia	Twickenham Stadium, London
6 October 2015	Fiji	47–15	Uruguay	Stadium mk, Milton Keynes
10 October 2015	Australia	15–6	Wales	Twickenham Stadium, London
10 October 2015	England	60–3	Uruguay	City of Manchester Stadium, Manchester

=== Pool B ===
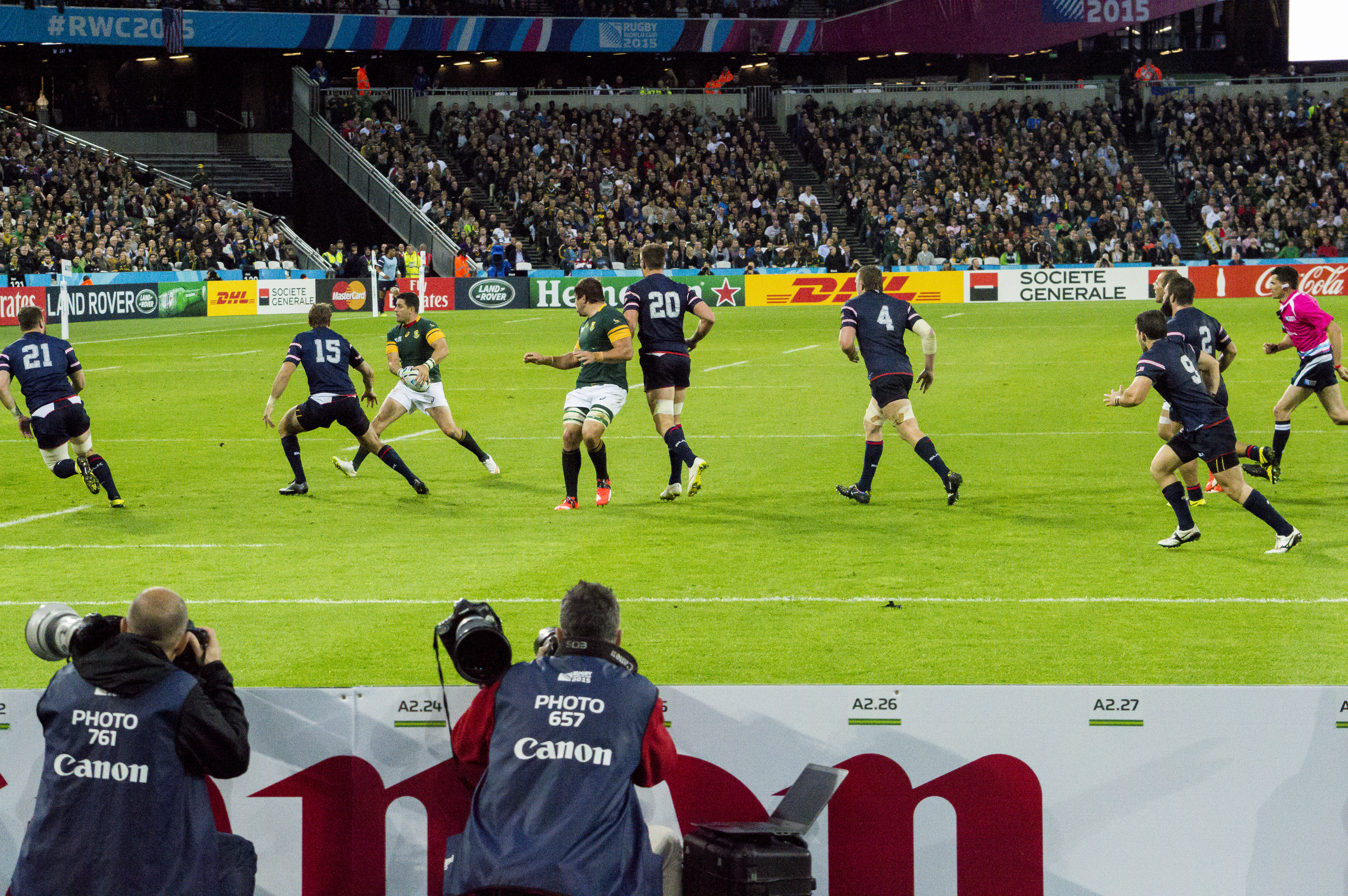
South Africa beat the USA 64–0 at the Olympic Stadium in London.

Pos	Team	Pld	W	D	L	PF	PA	PD	T	B	Pts
1	South Africa	4	3	0	1	176	56	+120	23	4	16
2	Scotland	4	3	0	1	136	93	+43	14	2	14
3	Japan	4	3	0	1	98	100	−2	9	0	12
4	Samoa	4	1	0	3	69	124	−55	7	2	6
5	United States	4	0	0	4	50	156	−106	5	0	0

19 September 2015	South Africa	32–34	Japan	Brighton Community Stadium, Brighton
20 September 2015	Samoa	25–16	United States	Brighton Community Stadium, Brighton
23 September 2015	Scotland	45–10	Japan	Kingsholm, Gloucester
26 September 2015	South Africa	46–6	Samoa	Villa Park, Birmingham
27 September 2015	Scotland	39–16	United States	Elland Road, Leeds
3 October 2015	Samoa	5–26	Japan	Stadium MK, Milton Keynes
3 October 2015	South Africa	34–16	Scotland	St. James' Park, Newcastle
7 October 2015	South Africa	64–0	United States	Olympic Stadium, London
10 October 2015	Samoa	33–36	Scotland	St. James' Park, Newcastle
11 October 2015	United States	18–28	Japan	Kingsholm, Gloucester

=== Pool C ===
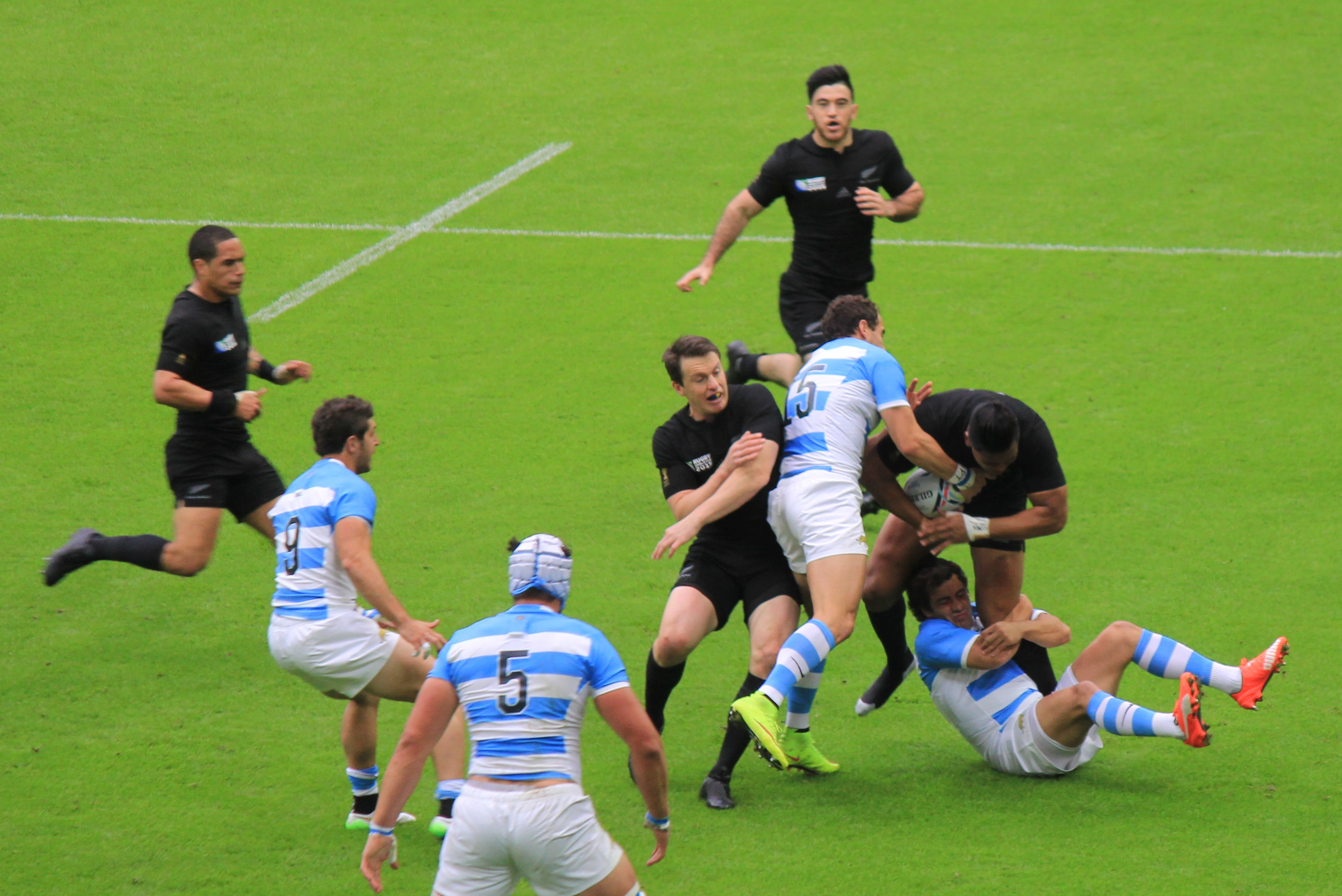
New Zealand beat Argentina 26–16 at Wembley Stadium in London.

Pos	Team	Pld	W	D	L	PF	PA	PD	T	B	Pts
1	New Zealand	4	4	0	0	174	49	+125	25	3	19
2	Argentina	4	3	0	1	179	70	+109	22	3	15
3	Georgia	4	2	0	2	53	123	−70	5	0	8
4	Tonga	4	1	0	3	70	130	−60	8	2	6
5	Namibia	4	0	0	4	70	174	−104	8	1	1

19 September 2015	Tonga	10–17	Georgia	Kingsholm, Gloucester
20 September 2015	New Zealand	26–16	Argentina	Wembley Stadium, London
24 September 2015	New Zealand	58–14	Namibia	Olympic Stadium, London
25 September 2015	Argentina	54–9	Georgia	Kingsholm, Gloucester
29 September 2015	Tonga	35–21	Namibia	Sandy Park, Exeter
2 October 2015	New Zealand	43–10	Georgia	Millennium Stadium, Cardiff
4 October 2015	Argentina	45–16	Tonga	Leicester City Stadium, Leicester
7 October 2015	Namibia	16–17	Georgia	Sandy Park, Exeter
9 October 2015	New Zealand	47–9	Tonga	St. James' Park, Newcastle
11 October 2015	Argentina	64–19	Namibia	Leicester City Stadium, Leicester

=== Pool D ===
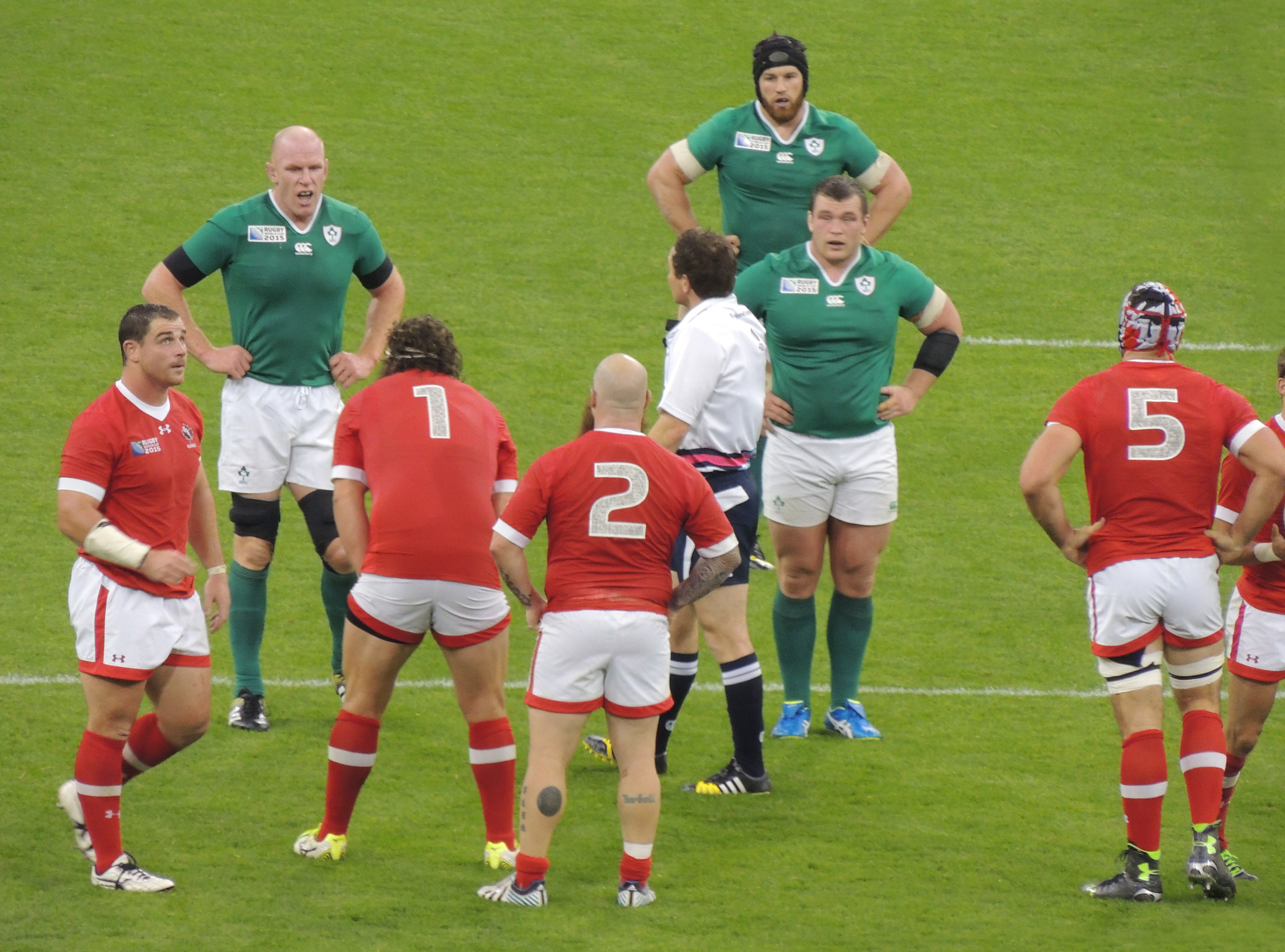
Ireland beat Canada 50–7 at the Millennium Stadium in Cardiff.

Pos	Team	Pld	W	D	L	PF	PA	PD	T	B	Pts
1	Ireland	4	4	0	0	134	35	+99	16	2	18
2	France	4	3	0	1	120	63	+57	12	2	14
3	Italy	4	2	0	2	74	88	−14	7	2	10
4	Romania	4	1	0	3	60	129	−69	7	0	4
5	Canada	4	0	0	4	58	131	−73	7	2	2

19 September 2015	Ireland	50–7	Canada	Millennium Stadium, Cardiff
19 September 2015	France	32–10	Italy	Twickenham Stadium, London
23 September 2015	France	38–11	Romania	Olympic Stadium, London
26 September 2015	Italy	23–18	Canada	Elland Road, Leeds
27 September 2015	Ireland	44–10	Romania	Wembley Stadium, London
1 October 2015	France	41–18	Canada	Stadium MK, Milton Keynes
4 October 2015	Ireland	16–9	Italy	Olympic Stadium, London
6 October 2015	Canada	15–17	Romania	Leicester City Stadium, Leicester
11 October 2015	Italy	32–22	Romania	Sandy Park, Exeter
11 October 2015	France	9–24	Ireland	Millennium Stadium, Cardiff

== Knockout stage ==
Quarter-finals
17 October – London (Twickenham)
South Africa	23
Wales	19
17 October – Cardiff
New Zealand	62
France	13
18 October – Cardiff
Ireland	20
Argentina	43
18 October – London (Twickenham)
Australia	35
Scotland	34

Semi-finals
24 October – London (Twickenham)
South Africa	18
New Zealand	20
25 October – London (Twickenham)
Argentina	15
Australia	29

Final
31 October – London (Twickenham)
New Zealand	34
Australia	17
Third place
30 October – London (Olympic)
South Africa	24
Argentina	13

=== Quarter-finals ===
17 October 2015
16:00 BST (UTC+01)

South Africa	23–19	Wales
Try: Du Preez 75' m Pen: Pollard (5/7) 9', 13', 17', 21', 62'; Drop: Pollard 52'	Report	Try: G. Davies 18' c Con: Biggar (1/1) 19'; Pen: Biggar (3/4) 15', 47', 64'; Drop: Biggar 40'

Twickenham Stadium, London
Attendance: 79,572
Referee: Wayne Barnes (England)

17 October 2015
20:00 BST (UTC+01)

New Zealand	62–13	France
Try: Retallick 11' c Milner-Skudder 23' c Savea (3) 29' c, 38' m, 59' c Kaino 50' m Read 64' c Kerr-Barlow (2) 68' c, 71' c Con: Carter (7/9) 12', 25', 31', 60', 65', 68', 72'; Pen: Carter (1/1) 7'	Report	Try: Picamoles 36' c Con: Parra (1/1) 37'; Pen: Spedding (1/1) 9'; Parra (1/2) 15'

Millennium Stadium, Cardiff
Attendance: 71,619
Referee: Nigel Owens (Wales)

18 October 2015
13:00 BST (UTC+01)

Ireland	20–43	Argentina
Try: Fitzgerald 26' c Murphy 44' c Con: Madigan (2/2) 27', 45'; Pen: Madigan (2/4) 20', 53'	Report	Try: Moroni 3' c Imhoff (2) 10' c, 73' c Tuculet 69' c Con: Sánchez (4/4) 5', 10', 70', 74'; Pen: Sánchez (5/6) 13', 22', 51', 64', 77'

Millennium Stadium, Cardiff
Attendance: 72,316
Referee: Jérôme Garcès (France)

18 October 2015
16:00 BST (UTC+01)

Australia	35–34	Scotland
Try: Ashley-Cooper 9' m Mitchell (2) 30' m, 43' c Hooper 40' m Kuridrani 64' c Con: Foley (2/5) 44', 65'; Pen: Foley (2/2) 54', 80'	Report	Try: Horne 18' c Seymour 59' m Bennett 74' c Con: Laidlaw (2/3) 19', 75'; Pen: Laidlaw (5/5) 14', 21', 34', 47', 69'

Twickenham Stadium, London
Attendance: 77,110
Referee: Craig Joubert (South Africa)

=== Semi-finals ===
24 October 2015
16:00 BST (UTC+01)

South Africa	18–20	New Zealand
Pen: Pollard (5/5) 3', 11', 21', 39', 58'; Lambie (1/1) 69'	Report	Try: Kaino 6' c Barrett 52' c Con: Carter (2/2) 9', 53'; Pen: Carter (1/2) 60'; Drop: Carter 46'

Twickenham Stadium, London
Attendance: 80,090
Referee: Jérôme Garcès (France)

25 October 2015
16:00 GMT (UTC+00)

Argentina	15–29	Australia
Pen: Sánchez (5/5) 7', 24', 36', 45', 55'	Report	Try: Simmons 2' c Ashley-Cooper (3) 10' c, 32' m, 72' c Con: Foley (3/4) 3', 11', 73'; Pen: Foley (1/2) 48'

Twickenham Stadium, London
Attendance: 80,025
Referee: Wayne Barnes (England)

=== Bronze final ===
30 October 2015
20:00 GMT (UTC+00)

South Africa	24–13	Argentina
Try: Pietersen 6' c Etzebeth 43' m Con: Pollard (1/2) 7'; Pen: Pollard (4/5) 14', 33', 40', 48'	Report	Try: Orlandi 80' c Con: Sánchez (1/1) 80'; Pen: Sánchez (1/1) 52'; Drop: Sánchez 42'

Olympic Stadium, London
Attendance: 55,925
Referee: John Lacey (Ireland)

=== Final ===
31 October 2015
16:00 GMT (UTC+00)

New Zealand	34–17	Australia
Try: Milner-Skudder 39' c Nonu 42' m Barrett 79' c Con: Carter (2/3) 40', 80'; Pen: Carter (4/4) 8', 27', 36', 75'; Drop: Carter 70'	Report	Try: Pocock 53' c Kuridrani 64' c Con: Foley (2/2) 54', 65'; Pen: Foley (1/1) 14'

Twickenham Stadium, London
Attendance: 80,125
Referee: Nigel Owens (Wales)

== Awards ==
At the 2015 World Rugby Awards, Japan's game-winning final try against South Africa was named the best match moment of the tournament. A dream team was named made up of the best performing players of the tournament.

2015 Rugby World Cup dream team

Pos.		Player
FB	15	(Japan) Ayumu Goromaru
RW	14	(New Zealand) Nehe Milner-Skudder
OC	13	(New Zealand) Conrad Smith
IC	12	(Australia) Matt Giteau
LW	11	(New Zealand) Julian Savea
FH	10	(New Zealand) Dan Carter
SH	9	(Scotland) Greig Laidlaw

Pos.		Player
N8	8	(Australia) David Pocock
OF	7	(South Africa) Schalk Burger
BF	6	(Georgia (country)) Mamuka Gorgodze
RL	5	(Fiji) Leone Nakarawa
LL	4	(South Africa) Eben Etzebeth
TP	3	(Argentina) Ramiro Herrera
HK	2	(Australia) Stephen Moore
LP	1	(Argentina) Marcos Ayerza

== Statistics ==
Most points
Player	Team	Points
Nicolás Sánchez	Argentina	97
Handré Pollard	South Africa	93
Bernard Foley	Australia	82
Dan Carter	New Zealand	82
Greig Laidlaw	Scotland	79

The tournament's top point scorer was Argentine fly-half Nicolás Sánchez, who scored 97 points. New Zealand wing Julian Savea scored the most tries, eight, equalling the record for one tournament set by his compatriot Jonah Lomu and South African Bryan Habana.

== Match officials ==
World Rugby named the following twelve referees, seven assistant referees and four television match officials to handle the pool stage games:

Referees

- Wayne Barnes (England)
- George Clancy (Ireland)
- JP Doyle (England)
- Jérôme Garcès (France)
- Pascal Gaüzère (France)
- Glen Jackson (New Zealand)
- Craig Joubert (South Africa)
- John Lacey (Ireland)
- Nigel Owens (Wales)
- Jaco Peyper (South Africa)
- Romain Poite (France)
- Chris Pollock (New Zealand)

Assistant referees

- Federico Anselmi (Argentina)
- Stuart Berry (South Africa)
- Mike Fraser (New Zealand)
- Angus Gardner (Australia)
- Leighton Hodges (Wales)
- Marius Mitrea (Italy)
- Mathieu Raynal (France)

Television match officials

- George Ayoub (Australia)
- Graham Hughes (England)
- Ben Skeen (New Zealand)
- Shaun Veldsman (South Africa)

== Media coverage ==
ITV Sport was the UK and worldwide host broadcaster for the 2015 event, having signed a deal in 2011 to broadcast the 2011 and 2015 RWC tournaments. ITV won the rights after outbidding rivals including the BBC and Sky Sports. It showed every match from the tournament live in the UK on ITV or ITV4.

Country or region	Broadcaster	Broadcasting
Africa^{1}	SuperSport	All 48 matches broadcast live
Argentina	ESPN Extra	All 48 matches broadcast live.
Argentina	TV Pública	All Argentina matches, plus opening, semi-final and final matches.
Australia	Fox Sports	All 48 matches broadcast live
Australia	Nine Network	All Australian matches, some other pool games and all knockout games free-to-air live
Azerbaijan; Turkey	Tivibu Spor	45 matches live (excluding Tonga v Georgia, Wales v Fiji and France v Canada at the pool stage)
Brazil	ESPN Brasil	All 48 matches broadcast live
Canada	TSN	All 48 matches live on either TSN, TSN2 or TSN.ca
Canada	RDS	Rights to a select number of matches in French
Caribbean; Central America^{2} Mexico; South America^{3}	ESPN	At least 16 matches (all Argentina and Uruguay matches, plus all knockout stage matches).
China	CCTV	All 48 matches broadcast live
Czech Republic; Slovakia	Pragosport/Czech Television	All 48 matches broadcast live
Fiji	Fiji TV	All 48 matches broadcast live
Fiji	FBC TV	All 48 matches broadcast live free to air
France and French Overseas Territories	TF1	21 matches, including all France matches, selected pool stage matches, all knockout stage matches
France and French Overseas Territories	Canal+	27 matches that will not be broadcast by TF1
Georgia	1TV	All 48 matches broadcast live
Hungary	Digi Sport	More than 40 matches broadcast live
India	Sony SIX	All 48 matches broadcast live
Ireland	TV3; 3e	All 48 matches broadcast live. TV3 began broadcasting in HD just before the competition.
Israel	Sport1	TBA
Italy	Sky Sport	All 48 matches broadcast live, and delay at 11 p.m. of Italy matches, a quarter-final, a semi-final and the final on TV8
Japan	J Sports	All 48 matches broadcast live
Japan	Nippon TV	Japanese commentary of all Japanese pool-stage matches, 2 quarter-finals, both semi-finals, the bronze final and the final
Japan	NHK	Free to air coverage of 16 matches, including all Japanese matches, the opening match, 2 quarter-finals, both semi-finals, the bronze final and the final
Latvia	Best 4 Sport TV	All 48 matches live or on delay and repeat
Netherlands	RTL 7	Total of 24 matches live
New Zealand	Sky Sport	All 48 matches broadcast live
New Zealand	Prime Television	Live: opening match, 2 quarter-finals, 1 semi-final, bronze final, final; delayed: New Zealand pool matches, other quarter-finals, other semi-final.
Poland	Polsat Sport	All 48 matches broadcast live or on delay
Portugal	Sport TV	All 48 matches broadcast live
Romania	Digi Sport	All 48 matches broadcast live
Russia	Peretz	More than 30 matches broadcast delay on TV and live on internet
Samoa	Sky Pacific (Fiji TV)	All 48 matches broadcast live
South Asia	Sony SIX	All 48 matches broadcast live with sister channel Sony Kix.
Sri Lanka	Channel Eye	All 48 matches live or on delay and repeat (Free to air)
South Africa	SABC; SuperSport	29 live matches, including all South African matches, and 7 delayed matches All 48 matches broadcast live with repeats and highlights
Spain	Canal+ Deportes (Movistar+)	All 48 matches broadcast live
Tonga	Sky Pacific (Fiji TV)	All 48 matches broadcast live
United Kingdom	ITV Network	All 48 matches live on either ITV, STV (Scotland), UTV (Northern Ireland) or ITV4
United Kingdom	BBC Radio	Live radio commentary for all 48 games. Radio Cymru broadcast live commentary of all Wales games in Welsh
United Kingdom	S4C	All Wales matches live in Welsh, the opening match, one quarter-final and one semi-final, the bronze final and the final
United States	Universal Sports; NBC & Univision	All 48 matches live online in the US; Live coverage of nine matches between the two broadcasters – all USA pool matches, opening match, both semi-finals, bronze final and the final
Uruguay	Teledoce	Only Uruguay matches

^{1} Except British Indian Ocean Territory – Chagos Archipelago, Cape Verde, Chad, Democratic Republic of Congo, Djibouti, Mauritania, Mauritius, Mayotte, North Africa, Réunion, Somalia, South Sudan and Tristan da Cunha
^{2} Except Belize
^{3} Except Brazil and South Georgia and South Sandwich Islands

Television network	Country or region	Broadcasting
Canal+ Africa	Francophone Central and West Africa	All 48 matches live on Canal+ Sport 3
Eurosport	Austria, Belgium, Germany, Liechtenstein, Luxembourg, Switzerland	20 matches live, including opening match and final
Fox Sports Asia	Cambodia, China (Via STAR Sports), Hong Kong, Indonesia, South Korea (via STAR Sports Korea), Macau, Mongolia, Myanmar, Papua New Guinea, Philippines, Singapore, Taiwan, Thailand, Vietnam, Malaysia	All 48 matches broadcast live
Fiji TV	Cook Islands, East Timor, Solomon Islands, Niue, Nauru, Vanuatu, Kiribati, Northern Marianas, Tokelau, Tahiti, Tuvalu, New Caledonia, American Samoa, Marshall Islands, Palau and Federated States of Micronesia. Papua New Guinea, Wallis and Futuna, Nouvelle Calédonie, Îles Éparses, Polynésie Française.	All 48 matches broadcast live
OSN	Algeria, Bahrain, Egypt, Jordan, Kuwait, Lebanon, Morocco, Saudi Arabia, Oman, Qatar, Tunisia, UAE	All 48 matches broadcast live or on delay
TF1	Monaco	21 matches, including all French matches, selected pool stage matches, all knockout matches
Viaplay, Viasat	Denmark, Finland, Norway, Sweden	All 48 matches broadcast live on OTT Service Viaplay, with selected games on Viasat Sport

== Video game ==
The officially licensed Rugby World Cup 2015 video game was released on 4 September 2015 on PC, PS3, PS4, PS Vita, Xbox 360 and Xbox One. IGN rated the game 1.5/10, calling it "unbearable to play".

== Tickets ==
Ticket prices were announced in November 2013 with general sale applications launching in September 2014. Adult ticket prices started at £15 for pool matches and children's tickets were available from £7 at 41 of the 48 matches. Tickets for the final ranged from £150 to £715.

== See also ==
- 2015 Rugby World Cup warm-up matches
