= 2017–18 Munster Rugby season =

- Ground(s): Thomond Park (Capacity: 25,600); Irish Independent Park (Capacity: 8,008)
- Director of Rugby: Rassie Erasmus (until 13 November 2017)
- Coach: Johann van Graan (from 20 November 2017)
- Captain: Peter O'Mahony
- Most appearances: Jack O'Donoghue (30)
- Top scorer: Ian Keatley (174)
- Most tries: Alex Wootton (9)
- League: Pro14
- 2017–18: 2nd (Conf. A), Semi-finals
1st kit	2nd kit	3rd kit

The 2017–18 Munster Rugby season was Munster's seventeenth season competing in the Pro14, alongside which they also competed in the European Rugby Champions Cup. It was Rassie Erasmus's second season as director of rugby and Johann van Graan's first as head coach.

== Events ==
In June 2017, after many weeks of media speculation, Munster confirmed that director of rugby Rassie Erasmus and Defence Coach Jacques Nienaber would leave their roles with the province and return to South Africa on 31 December 2017. In the same month however, coaches Jerry Flannery and Felix Jones extended their contracts with the province by two years, both expanding their roles to forwards coach and backline and attack coach respectively. Team manager Niall O'Donovan also signed a new three-year contract.

In the provinces only pre-season fixture, Munster beat English side Worcester Warriors 35–26 in Sixways Stadium on 24 August. The match saw former Munster stalwarts Peter Stringer and Donncha O'Callaghan play against their old club, while new signings Chris Farrell, Gerbrandt Grobler and James Hart made their non-competitive debuts for Munster. Munster began their 2017–18 Pro14 campaign on 1 September 2017, scoring six tries on their way to a comfortable 34–3 win against Benetton. In October 2017, Munster confirmed that then-South Africa Forwards Coach Johann van Graan would join the province in November as their new head coach. In the same month, it was announced that Munster's all-time leading try scorer, Simon Zebo, would leave the province at the end of the season.

In Rounds 1 & 2 of the 2017–18 European Rugby Champions Cup in October 2017, Munster drew 17–17 away to Castres before earning a 14–7 win at home to Racing 92. Erasmus and Nienaber left the province in early November 2017, with the province confirming their departure on 13 November 2017. Johann van Graan's first official game as Munster's new head coach was a 36–19 win away against Zebre in the Pro14 on 26 November 2017. Lions Defence Coach JP Ferreira joined Munster in December 2017. In the December Champions Cup double-header against Leicester Tigers, Munster won 33–10 at home before winning 25–16 away, their first win at Welford Road for 11 years. In doing so, Munster became the first team to defeat Leicester in both games of the double-header since they were introduced in 1999, while the home victory also saw Munster surpass 4,000 points in the competition. In Rounds 5 & 6 of the Champions Cup, Munster lost 34–30 away to Racing 92 before beating Castres 48–3 at home, securing a record 17th quarter-final. Munster beat 3-time tournament champions Toulon 20–19 in the quarter-final after a late Andrew Conway try and conversion from Ian Keatley. In the semi-final, Munster were beaten 27–22 by their French pool 4 opponents Racing 92.

Munster finished 2nd in Conference A of the 2017–18 Pro14 season on 69 points. In their semi-final qualifier against Edinburgh on 5 May 2018, Munster won 20–16 to progress to a semi-final away from home. In the semi-final against recently crowned Champions Cup winners and arch-rivals Leinster on 19 May 2018, Munster lost 16–15, bringing to an end their 2017–18 season.

== Coaching and management staff 2017–18 ==
Position	Name	Nationality
Head coach	Johann van Graan	South Africa
Defence coach	JP Ferreira	South Africa
Backs and attack coach	Felix Jones	Ireland
Forwards coach	Jerry Flannery	Ireland
Team manager	Niall O'Donovan	Ireland
Head of athletic performance	Denis Logan	United States
Senior strength and conditioning coach	Aidan O'Connell	Ireland
Strength and conditioning coach	Adam Sheehan	Ireland
Strength and conditioning coach	PJ Wilson	Ireland
Performance analyst	George Murray	Ireland

== Senior playing squad 2017–18 ==
Munster player movements for the 2017–18 season. For a full list, see List of 2017–18 Pro14 transfers.

=== Players in ===
- (Ireland) Chris Farrell from (France) Grenoble
- (Ireland) JJ Hanrahan from (England) Northampton Saints
- (Ireland) James Hart from (France) Racing 92
- (Ireland) Brian Scott promoted from Academy
- (Ireland) Conor Oliver promoted from Academy
- (Ireland) Bill Johnston promoted from Academy
- (Ireland) Dan Goggin promoted from Academy
- (Ireland) Stephen Fitzgerald promoted from Academy
- (South Africa) Chris Cloete from (South Africa) Southern Kings\Pumas
- (South Africa) Gerbrandt Grobler from (France) Racing 92
- (England) Ciaran Parker from (England) Sale Sharks
- (Ireland) Mark Flanagan from (England) Saracens (three-month loan)
- (Ireland) Jeremy Loughman from (Ireland) Leinster (three-month contract)

=== Players out ===
- (Ireland) Dave Foley to (France) Pau
- (Ireland) Cian Bohane retired
- (Ireland) Rory Burke to (England) Nottingham
- (Australia) Mark Chisholm retired
- (Ireland) Donnacha Ryan to (France) Racing 92
- (Ireland) John Madigan to (France) Massy
- (Ireland) Peter McCabe to (Ireland) Connacht
- (New Zealand) Francis Saili to (England) Harlequins
- (Ireland) Duncan Casey to (France) Grenoble

The Munster senior squad for 2017–18 is:

Note: Flags indicate national union under World Rugby eligibility rules. Players may hold more than one non-World Rugby nationality.

Player	Position	Union
Duncan Casey	Hooker	Ireland
Rhys Marshall	Hooker	New Zealand
Kevin O'Byrne	Hooker	Ireland
**Niall Scannell**	Hooker	Ireland
**Mike Sherry**	Hooker	Ireland
**Stephen Archer**	Prop	Ireland
**James Cronin**	Prop	Ireland
**Dave Kilcoyne**	Prop	Ireland
Jeremy Loughman	Prop	Ireland
Ciaran Parker*	Prop	England
**John Ryan**	Prop	Ireland
Brian Scott	Prop	Ireland
Mark Flanagan	Lock	Ireland
Gerbrandt Grobler	Lock	South Africa
**Billy Holland**	Lock	Ireland
Jean Kleyn	Lock	South Africa
Darren O'Shea	Lock	Ireland
Chris Cloete	Flanker	South Africa
Dave O'Callaghan	Flanker	Ireland
**Tommy O'Donnell**	Flanker	Ireland
Conor Oliver	Flanker	Ireland
**Peter O'Mahony** (c)	Flanker	Ireland
**Robin Copeland**	Number 8	Ireland
**Jack O'Donoghue**	Number 8	Ireland
**CJ Stander**	Number 8	Ireland

Player	Position	Union
James Hart	Scrum-half	Ireland
**Conor Murray**	Scrum-half	Ireland
Duncan Williams	Scrum-half	Ireland
Tyler Bleyendaal*	Fly-half	New Zealand
JJ Hanrahan	Fly-half	Ireland
Bill Johnston	Fly-half	Ireland
**Ian Keatley**	Fly-half	Ireland
Sammy Arnold	Centre	Ireland
**Chris Farrell**	Centre	Ireland
Dan Goggin	Centre	Ireland
David Johnston	Centre	Ireland
**Rory Scannell**	Centre	Ireland
**Jaco Taute**	Centre	South Africa
**Andrew Conway**	Wing	Ireland
**Keith Earls**	Wing	Ireland
Ronan O'Mahony	Wing	Ireland
**Darren Sweetnam**	Wing	Ireland
Alex Wootton	Wing	Ireland
Stephen Fitzgerald	Fullback	Ireland
**Simon Zebo**	Fullback	Ireland

- Internationally capped players in **bold**.
- Players qualified to play for Ireland on residency or dual nationality. *
- Irish provinces are currently limited to four non-Irish eligible (NIE) players and one non-Irish qualified player (NIQ or "Project Player").
- Notes:

== 2017–18 Pro14 ==
2017–18 Pro14 tables
Conference A
	Team	P	W	D	L	PF	PA	PD	TF	TA	TBP	LBP	PTS
1	(Scotland) Glasgow Warriors (SF)	21	15	1	5	614	366	+248	81	38	12	2	76
2	(Ireland) Munster (SF)	21	13	1	7	568	361	+207	78	42	10	5	69
3	(South Africa) Cheetahs (QF)	21	12	0	9	609	554	+55	75	68	10	5	63
4	(Wales) Cardiff Blues	21	11	0	10	502	482	+20	56	59	5	5	54
5	(Wales) Ospreys	21	9	0	12	390	487	−97	44	60	5	3	44
6	(Ireland) Connacht	21	7	0	14	445	477	−32	53	54	5	6	39
7	(Italy) Zebre	21	7	0	14	408	593	–185	50	78	4	4	36
Conference B
	Team	P	W	D	L	PF	PA	PD	TF	TA	TBP	LBP	PTS
1	(Ireland) Leinster (CH)	21	14	1	6	601	374	+227	83	46	10	2	70
2	(Wales) Scarlets (RU)	21	14	1	6	528	365	+163	69	43	9	3	70
3	(Scotland) Edinburgh (QF)	21	15	0	6	494	375	+119	62	44	7	1	68
4	(Ireland) Ulster (PO)	21	12	2	7	538	482	+56	68	61	8	2	62
5	(Italy) Benetton	21	11	0	10	415	451	−36	51	55	6	5	55
6	(Wales) Dragons	21	2	2	17	378	672	−294	43	94	4	4	20
7	(South Africa) Southern Kings	21	1	0	20	378	829	−451	48	119	4	3	11
If teams are level at any stage, tiebreakers are applied in the following order -: 1. number of matches won 2. the difference between points for and points against 3. the number of tries scored 4. the most points scored 5. the difference between tries for and tries against 6. the fewest red cards received 7. the fewest yellow cards received
Green background indicates teams that competed in the Pro14 play-offs, and also earned a place in the 2018–19 European Champions Cup (excluding South African teams who are ineligible); Blue background indicates teams outside the play-off places that earned a place in the 2018–19 European Champions Cup, including the winner of the play-off between the two fourth-ranked European teams in each conference Yellow background indicates the loser of the play-off between the two fourth-ranked European teams in each conference, that earned a place in the 2018–19 European Rugby Challenge Cup. Plain background indicates teams that earned a place in the 2018–19 European Rugby Challenge Cup. (CH) Champions. (RU) Runners-up. (SF) Losing semi-finalists. (QF) Losing quarter-finalists. (PO) Champions Cup play-off winners.

=== Round 1 ===
1 September 2017
19:35

(1 BP) Munster (Ireland)	34–3	(Italy) Benetton
Try: Kleyn (2) 8' c, 48' c Bleyendaal 13' m Sweetnam 26' m Wootton 30' m Conway 34' m Con: Bleyendaal (2/6) 9', 49'	Report	Pen: Banks (1/1) 19'

Irish Independent Park
Attendance: 7,854
Referee: Ian Davies (WRU)

=== Round 2 ===
9 September 2017
17:15

(1 BP) Munster (Ireland)	51–18	(South Africa) Cheetahs
Try: O'Donnell 6' c Wootton (4) 19' c, 34' m, 54' m, 60' c Kleyn 48' m Farrell 50' c Zebo 71' m Con: Keatley (4/8) 7', 20', 50', 61'; Pen: Keatley (1/1) 3'	Report	Try: Small-Smith 40' m H. Venter 80' c Con: Petzer (1/2) 80'+1; Pen: Petzer (2/2) 15', 24'

Thomond Park
Attendance: 15,144
Referee: Ben Whitehouse (WRU)

=== Round 3 ===
16 September 2017
15:15

(1 BP) Ospreys (Wales)	16–21	(Ireland) Munster
Try: Hook 11' c Con: S. Davies (1/1) 12'; Pen: S. Davies (3/3) 43', 56', 63'	Report	Try: Kleyn 19' c Sweetnam 36' m Con: Bleyendaal (1/2) 20'; Pen: Bleyendaal (3/5) 9', 50', 76'

Liberty Stadium
Attendance: 7,302
Referee: Stuart Berry (SARU)

=== Round 4 ===
22 September 2017
19:35

(1 BP) Glasgow Warriors (Scotland)	37–10	(Ireland) Munster
Try: Sarto 3' c Jones 35' c Grigg 44' c Cummings 62' c Con: Russell (4/4) 4', 37', 45', 64'; Pen: Russell (3/3) 9', 34', 55'	Report	Try: R. Scannell 14' m Farrell 47' m

Scotstoun Stadium
Attendance: 7,351
Referee: Nigel Owens (WRU)

=== Round 5 ===
30 September 2017
13:30

(1 BP) Munster (Ireland)	39–16	(Wales) Cardiff Blues
Try: Murray 12' c Ryan 51' c Hanrahan (2) 55' c, 71' m Copeland 67' c Con: Keatley (4/5) 13', 52', 56', 68'; Pen: Keatley (2/2) 23', 35'	Report	Try: Turnbull 25' c Con: Evans (1/1) 26'; Pen: Evans (3/3) 7', 19', 30'

Thomond Park
Attendance: 13,558
Referee: Quinton Immelman (SARU)

=== Round 6 ===
7 October 2017
14:00

Leinster (Ireland)	23–17	(Ireland) Munster (1 BP)
Try: O'Loughlin (2) 16' c, 34' c Con: Sexton (2/2) 17', 35'; Pen: Sexton (3/3) 43', 51', 54'	Report	Try: Keatley 26' c Earls (2) 47' m, 78' m Con: Keatley (1/1) 27'

Aviva Stadium
Attendance: 46,374
Referee: Ben Whitehouse (WRU)

=== Round 7 ===
27 October 2017
19:35

Connacht (Ireland)	20–16	(Ireland) Munster (1 BP)
Try: O'Halloran 22' c Farrell 66' c Con: Carty (1/1) 22'; Ronaldson (1/1) 67'; Pen: Carty (2/3) 39', 50'	Report	Try: Zebo 3' c Con: Keatley (1/1) 4'; Pen: Keatley (2/2) 16', 30'; Hanrahan (1/1) 65'

Galway Sportsgrounds
Attendance: 7,089
Referee: Nigel Owens (WRU)

=== Round 8 ===
3 November 2017
19:35

(1 BP) Munster (Ireland)	49–6	(Wales) Dragons
Try: Scannell 20' c Zebo 28' c O'Donoghue 47' c Sweetnam 57' c Arnold (2) 63' c, 77' c O'Byrne 69' c Con: Hanrahan (7/7) 21', 30', 48', 58', 64', 70', 78'	Report	Pen: O'Brien (2/2) 24', 41'

Irish Independent Park
Attendance: 8,008
Referee: Mike Adamson (SRU)

=== Round 9 ===
26 November 2017
14:30

Zebre (Italy)	19–36	(Ireland) Munster (1 BP)
Try: Bisegni 35' c Sarto 40' c Venditti 68' m Con: Palazzani (2/3) 36', 40'+1	Report	Try: Scannell 17' c Hart 24' c Wootton (2) 51' m, 55' c Nash 80' c Con: Hanrahan (4/5) 18', 25', 56', 80'+1; Pen: Hanrahan (1/3) 9'

Stadio Sergio Lanfranchi
Attendance: 2,500
Referee: Lloyd Linton (SRU)

=== Round 10 ===
2 December 2017
17:30

(1 BP) Munster (Ireland)	36–10	(Wales) Ospreys
Try: Arnold 17' c Sweetnam 22' c Cloete 29' c Scannell 42' c O'Donoghue 55' m Con: Keatley (4/5) 18', 23', 30', 43'; Pen: Keatley (1/1) 4'	Report	Try: Hassler 38' m Jones 70' m

Irish Independent Park
Attendance: 8,008
Referee: Ben Whitehouse (WRU)

=== Round 11 ===
26 December 2017
15:15

(1 BP) Munster (Ireland)	24–34	(Ireland) Leinster (1 BP)
Try: Murray 17' m Keatley 45' c Conway (2) 48' c, 76' m Con: Keatley (2/3) 46', 49'	Report	Try: Leavy 8' c Penalty try 20'; Henshaw 22' c Larmour 69' c Con: R. Byrne (3/3) 9', 24', 70'; Pen: R. Byrne (2/2) 1', 12'

Thomond Park
Attendance: 26,267
Referee: Nigel Owens (WRU)

=== Round 12 ===
1 January 2018
17:35

(1 BP) Ulster (Ireland)	24–17	(Ireland) Munster (1 BP)
Try: Cave 57' c Gilroy (2) 61' m, 73' c Lyttle 79' m Con: Cooney (2/4) 58', 74'	Report	Try: Scannell (2) 13' m, 24' m Penalty try 33'

Kingspan Stadium
Attendance: 17,594
Referee: Sean Gallagher (IRFU)

=== Round 13 ===
6 January 2018
19:45

(1 BP) Munster (Ireland)	39–13	(Ireland) Connacht
Try: O'Shea 19' c Conway 53' c Earls 59' m Murray (2) 63' c, 69' c Con: Keatley (4/5) 20', 54', 64', 70'; Pen: Keatley (2/2) 30', 50'	Report	Try: McCartney 77'c Con: Ronaldson (1/1) 78'; Pen: Carty (2/2) 2', 24'

Thomond Park
Attendance: 18,604
Referee: David Wilkinson (IRFU)

=== Round 14 ===
10 February 2018
19:35

(1 BP) Munster (Ireland)	33–5	(Italy) Zebre
Try: Arnold (2) 25' m, 73' c Scott 36' c Copeland 55' c R. Scannell 57' c Con: Hanrahan (1/2) 37'; Keatley (3/3) 56', 58', 74'	Report	Try: Palazzani 52' m

Thomond Park
Attendance: 13,412
Referee: Ben Whitehouse (WRU)

=== Round 15 ===
17 February 2018
17:30

Cardiff Blues (Wales)	25–18	(Ireland) Munster (1 BP)
Try: Cook 18' m L. Williams 23' c Lane 26' c Con: Evans (2/3) 24', 27'; Pen: Evans (2/2) 67', 75'	Report	Try: Cloete 33' m Fitzgerald 52' c Con: Keatley (1/2) 53'; Pen: Keatley (1/2) 43'; Bleyendaal (1/1) 80'+1

Cardiff Arms Park
Attendance: 6,086
Referee: Stuart Berry (SARU)

=== Round 16 ===
23 February 2018
19:00

Munster (Ireland)	21–10	(Scotland) Glasgow Warriors
Try: Scannell 24' c Cronin 48' m Con: Bleyendaal (1/2) 24'; Pen: Bleyendaal (3/3) 10', 34', 61'	Report	Try: Horne 46' c Con: Hastings (1/1) 47'; Pen: Hastings (1/1) 42'

Irish Independent Park
Attendance: 8,008
Referee: Marius Mitrea (FIR)

=== Round 17 ===
2 March 2018
19:35

Edinburgh (Scotland)	Postponed	(Ireland) Munster

Murrayfield Stadium
Referee: Ben Whitehouse (WRU)

=== Round 17 rescheduled match ===
16 March 2018
19:35

Edinburgh (Scotland)	12–6	(Ireland) Munster (1 BP)
Try: Van der Merwe (2) 35' m, 56' c Con: Van der Walt (1/2) 57'	Report	Pen: Hanrahan (2/2) 19', 49'

Murrayfield Stadium
Attendance: 4,089
Referee: Ben Whitehouse (WRU)

- Match rescheduled from 2 March 2018.

=== Round 18 ===
24 March 2018
17:30

Munster (Ireland)	19–7	(Wales) Scarlets
Try: Hart 27' m Copeland 47' c Wootton 77' c Con: Keatley (2/3) 47', 78'	Report	Try: A. Davies 6' c Con: Patchell (1/1) 7'

Thomond Park
Attendance: 14,215
Referee: Marius Mitrea (FIR)

=== Round 19 ===
7 April 2018
18:35

Southern Kings (South Africa)	22–39	(Ireland) Munster
Try: Ntsila 26' c Greef 30' m Makase 74' c Con: Banda (2/3) 28', 75'; Pen: Banda (1/1) 35'	Report	Try: N. Scannell 37' m Nash 40'+3 m Stander 47' c Goggin 53' m Marshall 68' c Kilcoyne 71' c Con: Ian Keatley (3/5) 48', 68', 72'; Pen: Ian Keatley (1/1) 16'

Outeniqua Park
Attendance: 6,318
Referee: Lloyd Linton (SRU)

=== Round 20 ===
13 April 2018
18:35

(1 BP) Cheetahs (South Africa)	17–19	(Ireland) Munster
Try: Blommetjies 10' c Meyer 28' c Con: Goosen (2/2) 11', 29'; Pen: Goosen (1/1) 40'	Report	Try: Murray 36' c Con: Hanrahan (1/1) 36'; Pen: Hanrahan (3/3) 44', 52', 61'; Murray (1/1) 65'

Toyota Stadium
Attendance: 6,869
Referee: Mike Adamson (SRU)

=== Round 21 ===
28 April 2018
17:35

Munster (Ireland)	24–24	(Ireland) Ulster
Try: Williams 1' c Scott 26' c Copeland 48' c Con: Hanrahan (3/3) 2', 28', 49'; Pen: Hanrahan (1/1) 67'	Report	Try: McCloskey 4' c Best (2) 32' c, 40' c Con: McPhillips (3/3) 5', 34', 40'; Pen: McPhillips (1/1) 15'

Thomond Park
Attendance: 16,178
Referee: Ben Whitehouse (WRU)

=== Semi-final qualifier ===
5 May 2018
15:15

Munster (Ireland)	20–16	(Scotland) Edinburgh
Try: Marshall 8' c Earls 42' c Con: Hanrahan (2/2) 9', 43'; Pen: Hanrahan (2/3) 51', 72'	Report	Try: Fowles 58' c Con: Van der Walt (1/1) 59'; Pen: Hidalgo-Clyne (3/3) 18', 24', 55'

Thomond Park
Attendance: 10,205
Referee: Nigel Owens (WRU)

=== Semi-final ===
19 May 2018
15:15

Leinster (Ireland)	16–15	(Ireland) Munster
Try: Conan 7' c Con: Carbery (1/1) 7'; Pen: Byrne (2/3) 20', 45'; Carbery (1/2) 76'	Report	Try: Earls 43' m Grobler 78' c Con: Keatley (1/1) 78'; Pen: Hanrahan (1/2) 18'

RDS Arena
Attendance: 18,930
Referee: Stuart Berry (SARU)

== 2017–18 European Rugby Champions Cup ==
Munster faced Racing 92, Leicester Tigers and Castres Olympique in Pool 4 of the 2017–18 European Rugby Champions Cup. They were seeded in Tier 1 following their 1st-place finish in the regular 2016–17 Pro12 season.

Team	P	W	D	L	PF	PA	Diff	TF	TA	TB	LB	Pts
(Ireland) Munster (3)	6	4	1	1	167	87	+80	18	8	2	1	21
(France) Racing 92 (7)	6	4	0	2	128	105	+23	14	10	1	2	19
(France) Castres	6	2	1	3	111	161	–50	13	20	2	0	12
(England) Leicester Tigers	6	1	0	5	118	171	–53	12	19	1	2	7

=== Round 1 ===
15 October 2017
14:00

Castres (France)	17–17	(Ireland) Munster
Try: Ebersohn 12' c Dumora 32' c Con: Urdapilleta (2/2) 13', 33'; Pen: Urdapilleta (1/1) 50'	Report	Try: Zebo 30' c Kilcoyne 46' c Con: Bleyendaal (2/2) 31', 47'; Pen: Bleyendaal (1/1) 38'

Stade Pierre-Antoine
Attendance: 9,577
Referee: Matthew Carley (RFU)

=== Round 2 ===
21 October 2017
17:30

Munster (Ireland)	14–7	(France) Racing 92 (1 BP)
Try: Murray 60' c Conway 69' c Con: Keatley (2/2) 61', 70'	Report	Try: Nakarawa 75' c Con: Iribaren (1/1) 76'

Thomond Park
Attendance: 22,054
Referee: JP Doyle (RFU)

=== Round 3 ===
9 December 2017
19:45

(1 BP) Munster (Ireland)	33–10	(England) Leicester Tigers
Try: Marshall 19' c Zebo 30' c O'Mahony 55' m Cloete 67' m Con: Keatley (2/4) 20', 31'; Pen: Keatley (3/3) 7', 26', 37'	Report	Try: Thacker 64' c Con: G. Ford (1/1) 65'; Pen: G. Ford (1/1) 35'

Thomond Park
Attendance: 25,355
Referee: Jérôme Garcès (FFR)

=== Round 4 ===
17 December 2017
17:30

Leicester Tigers (England)	16–25	(Ireland) Munster
Try: Tait 12' c Con: G. Ford (1/1) 13'; Pen: G. Ford (3/3) 2', 51', 60'	Report	Try: Stander 42' c Con: Keatley (1/1) 43'; Pen: Keatley (6/7) 10', 23', 33', 39', 72', 77'

Welford Road
Attendance: 23,100
Referee: Mathieu Raynal (FFR)

=== Round 5 ===
14 January 2018
15:15

Racing 92 (France)	34–30	(Ireland) Munster (1 BP)
Try: Nyanga 2' c Andreu 42' m Szarzewski 64' c Con: Machenaud (2/3) 3', 65'; Pen: Machenaud (5/5) 8', 40', 55', 75', 77'	Report	Try: Kleyn 20' c Earls 45' c Farrell 51' c Con: Keatley (3/3) 21', 46', 51'; Pen: Keatley (2/3) 56', 64'; Murray (1/3) 74'

Paris La Défense Arena
Attendance: 16,155
Referee: Matthew Carley (RFU)

=== Round 6 ===
21 January 2018
16:00

(1 BP) Munster (Ireland)	48–3	(France) Castres
Try: Earls 33' c Marshall 44' c Penalty try 56'; Zebo 58' c Wootton 67' c Cronin 80' c Con: Keatley (3/3) 34', 45', 59'; Hanrahan (2/2) 68', 80'+1; Pen: Keatley (2/2) 17', 25'	Report	Pen: Kockott (1/1) 13'

Thomond Park
Attendance: 23,116
Referee: Ben Whitehouse (WRU)

=== Quarter-final ===
31 March 2018
15:15

Munster (Ireland) (3)	20–19	(6) (France) Toulon
Try: Murray 27' c Conway 74' c Con: Keatley (2/2) 28', 75'; Pen: Keatley (2/2) 31', 55'	Report	Try: Ashton 64' c Con: Trinh-Duc (1/1) 65'; Pen: Belleau (1/1) 9'; Trinh-Duc (2/2) 60', 67'; Drop: Belleau (1/1) 18'

Thomond Park
Attendance: 26,265
Referee: Nigel Owens (WRU)

=== Semi-final ===
22 April 2018
15:15

Racing 92 (France) (7)	27–22	(3) (Ireland) Munster
Try: Thomas (2) 4' c, 17' c Machenaud 21' c Con: Machenaud (3/3) 6', 19', 23'; Pen: Machenaud (2/3) 26', 42'	Report	Try: Zebo 62' m Marshall 75' c Conway 80' c Con: Hanrahan (2/3) 76', 80'+1; Pen: Keatley (1/1) 16'

Stade Chaban-Delmas
Attendance: 24,574
Referee: JP Doyle (RFU)
