= Billy Holland =

Irish rugby union player (born 1985)

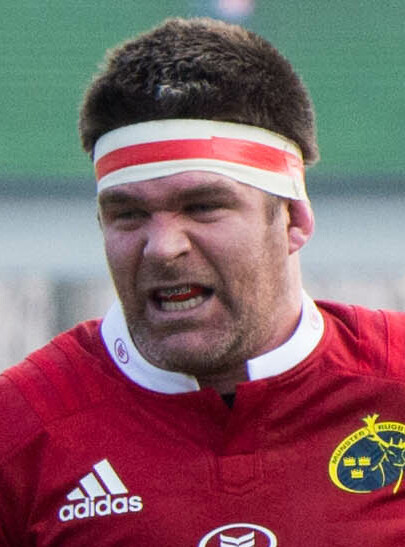
- Holland in 2017
- Born: 3 August 1985 (age 41) Cork, Ireland
- Height: 1.91 m (6 ft 3 in)
- Weight: 112 kg (17.6 st; 247 lb)
- School: Christian Brothers College
- University: University College Cork
- Notable relative: Jerry Holland (father)

Rugby union career
- Position(s): Lock, Flanker
Amateur team(s)
Years	Team	Apps	(Points)
- UCC
- Cork Constitution
Senior career
Years	Team	Apps	(Points)
2007–2021	Munster	247	(30)
- Correct as of 11 June 2021
International career
Years	Team	Apps	(Points)
2014–2015	Emerging Ireland	5	(5)
2016	Ireland	1	(0)
- Correct as of 12 November 2016

Billy Holland (born 3 August 1985) is an Irish former rugby union player, who spent his entire career playing for his native province of Munster, whilst also earning a single international cap for Ireland. He played primarily as a lock, though also played flanker occasionally, and represented Cork Constitution in the All-Ireland League.

== Professional career ==
=== Munster ===
Holland made his full debut for Munster against Scarlets on 22 September 2007, having made his non-competitive debut against Saracens in a friendly on 7 September. He was part of the Munster team that narrowly lost to New Zealand on 18 November 2008, in the opening game of the new Thomond Park. He made his Heineken Cup debut in Munster 2009–10 Heineken Cup quarter-final against Northampton Saints on 10 April 2010. Holland started for Munster in their historic 15–6 victory over Australia on 16 November 2010.

He signed a new two-year contract with Munster in March 2012. Holland led Munster A to victory in the 2011–12 British and Irish Cup Final, putting in a captains performance in the 31–12 win. Holland captained Munster against Dragons on 29 November 2013. He signed a new two-year contract with Munster in February 2014, which will see him remain with the province until at least June 2016. Holland was nominated for the 2015 Munster Rugby Senior Player of the Year Award in April 2015. In January 2016, Holland signed a new two-year contract with Munster. He was nominated for the 2016 Munster Senior Player of the Year Award, the second successive season he was nominated. On 5 May 2017, Holland was named in the 2016–17 Pro12 Dream Team. Holland started Munster's first 16 games of the 2017–18 season and signed a two-year contract extension with the province in January 2018.

He won his 200th cap for Munster during their 2018–19 Pro14 round 13 win against Connacht on 5 January 2019, becoming just the tenth player to achieve the feat with the province. He signed a one-year contract extension with the province in February 2020. Holland became Munster's joint-second most capped player with Ronan O'Gara on 240 caps when he captained the province to a 22–10 away win against Edinburgh in round 12 of the 2020–21 Pro14 on 20 February 2021, also winning the Man-of-the-Match award. He retired at the end of the 2020–21 season after 14 years with the province, and was named in the 2020–21 Pro14 Dream Team in his final season. Holland's final game for Munster was their 54–11 away win against Italian side Zebre in round 6 of the Pro14 Rainbow Cup on 11 June 2021.

=== Ireland ===
Holland had represented Ireland Schools, Ireland under 19s and Ireland under 21s. He won the IRUPA Award for Unsung Hero on 8 May 2013. He started for Emerging Ireland their second 2014 IRB Nations Cup game against Uruguay on 18 June 2014, scoring a try. He also started in the 31–10 victory over Romania on 22 June 2014, a win that secured the 2014 IRB Nations Cup for Emerging Ireland.

Holland was added to the senior Ireland squad for the 2015 Six Nations Championship game against England on 24 February 2015. He was named in the Emerging Ireland squad for the 2015 World Rugby Tbilisi Cup on 19 May 2015. Holland started in the opening 25–0 win against Emerging Italy on 13 June 2015. Holland started in the 33–7 win against Uruguay on 17 June 2015. He captained the side in the 45–12 win against Georgia on 21 June 2015, a win which secured the tournament for Emerging Ireland.

On 26 October 2016, Holland was named in Ireland's squad for the 2016 end-of-year rugby union internationals. On 12 November 2016, Holland made his senior Ireland debut when he started in the 52–21 win against Canada. On 23 January 2017, Holland was named in the Ireland squad for the opening two rounds of the 2017 Six Nations Championship. Holland was awarded the Contribution to Irish Society accolade at the Irish Rugby Players Awards in October 2020.

Holland was the recipient of the 2021 Guinness Rugby Writers of Ireland's Tom Rooney Award in recognition of his contribution to Irish rugby.

== Honours ==
=== Emerging Ireland ===
- World Rugby Nations Cup
  - Winner (1): 2014
- World Rugby Tbilisi Cup
  - Winner (1): 2015

=== Individual ===
- United Rugby Championship Dream Team
  - Member (2): 2016–17, 2020–21
