= Dave Foley (rugby union) =

Irish rugby union player

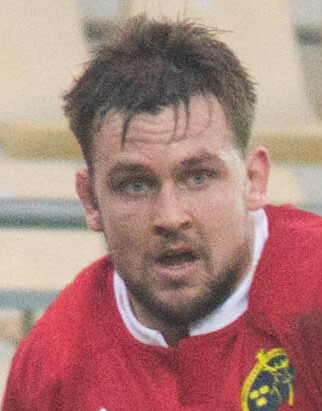
- Foley in 2016
- Born: 16 May 1978 (age 48) Clonmel, Ireland
- Height: 1.98 m (6 ft 6 in)
- Weight: 112 kg (17.6 st; 247 lb)
- School: CBS High School Clonmel
- University: University of Limerick

Rugby union career
- Position: Lock
Amateur team(s)
Years	Team	Apps	(Points)
20??–2017	UL Bohemians		
Senior career
Years	Team	Apps	(Points)
2010–2017	Munster	84	(0)
2017–2019	Pau	29	(5)
- Correct as of 4 May 2019
International career
Years	Team	Apps	(Points)
2013–2014	Emerging Ireland	6	(0)
2014	Ireland	2	(0)
- Correct as of 30 November 2014

Dave Foley (born 16 May 1988) is an Irish rugby union player for French side Pau in the Top 14 and European Rugby Challenge Cup. He plays as a lock.

== Munster ==
Foley made his Munster debut against Connacht in April 2010. His first start for Munster was against Benetton Treviso in February 2011. A dislocated shoulder sustained in a Pro12 game against Newport Gwent Dragons on 3 March 2012 ruled Foley out for 'a while'. He signed a one-year contract extension with Munster in March 2012. In January 2013, Foley signed a further contract extension with Munster. Foley was ruled out for 3 months with a wrist injury in January 2015. He returned form the injury on 5 September 2015. On 16 March 2017, it was confirmed that Foley required a second wrist surgery.

== Pau ==
On 21 March 2017, it was announced that Foley would joining French Top 14 side Pau at the beginning of the 2017–18 season. In making the move, Foley joined ex-Munster teammates Paddy Butler and Sean Dougall and former Munster backs coach Simon Mannix at the club.

== Ireland ==
Foley was named in the Emerging Ireland squad to take part in the 2013 IRB Tbilisi Cup on 19 May 2013. He started against Georgia in Emerging Ireland's first game of the tournament on 7 June 2013. Foley also started in Emerging Ireland' second game, a 19–8 defeat to South Africa President's XV on 11 June 2013. He started Emerging Ireland 42–33 final game victory against Uruguay on 16 June 2013. Foley was again selected in the Emerging Ireland squad when it was announced on 26 May 2014. He started against Russia in their first 2014 IRB Nations Cup match on 13 June 2014. Foley came off the bench in their second game against Uruguay on 18 June 2014. He started in the 31–10 win Romania on 22 June 2014, a win that secured the 2014 IRB Nations Cup for Emerging Ireland.

Foley was named in the Ireland squad for the 2014 Guinness Series on 21 October 2014. Foley made his senior debut for Ireland on 16 November 2014, starting in the 49–7 win against Georgia and earning the Man-of-the-Match award. He also came on in the 26–23 win against Australia on 22 November 2014. On 22 February 2016, Foley was named in Ireland's squad for the 2016 Six Nations Championship fixture against England. He was called-up as an injury replacement for Mike McCarthy.

== Honours ==
=== Emerging Ireland ===
- World Rugby Tbilisi Cup
  - Runner-Up (1): (2013)
- World Rugby Nations Cup
  - Winner (1): (2014)
