= 2014 IRB Nations Cup =

Tournament details
- Countries: Emerging Ireland; Romania; Russia; Uruguay
- Tournament format(s): Round-robin
- Date: 13 – 22 June 2014

Tournament statistics
- Teams: 4
- Matches played: 6
- Tries scored: 31 (5.17 per match)
- Top point scorer(s): (Romania) Florin Vlaicu (32 points)
- Top try scorer(s): (Ireland) Craig Gilroy (4 tries)

Final
- Champions: Emerging Ireland
- Runners-up: Romania

The 2014 IRB Nations Cup was the ninth edition of the international rugby union tournament, a competition created by the International Rugby Board. For the eighth time in a row, it was held in Bucharest, Romania. It was played between 13 and 22 June and ran alongside the 2014 IRB Tbilisi Cup in Georgia. Romania were joined by Uruguay, Emerging Ireland and ENC side Russia and defended the title they won in 2012 and 2013. All of the fixtures were played at the 5,000 capacity Stadionul Naţional de Rugby, the home stadium for the hosts Romania.

The Emerging Ireland team won the title for the first time and Robin Copeland was named as the player of the tournament.

== Standings ==
	Team	Games				Points			Tries		Bounus points		Points
	Team	Played	Won	Drawn	Lost	For	Against	Difference	For	Against	Try Bonus	Losing Bonus	Points
1	Emerging Ireland	3	3	0	0	148	13	135	21	1	3	0	15
2	Romania	3	2	0	1	64	65	–1	6	7	0	0	8
3	Uruguay	3	1	0	2	32	91	–59	2	10	0	0	4
4	Russia	3	0	0	3	24	99	–75	2	13	0	2	2
Source : www.irb.com Points breakdown: *4 points for a win *2 points for a draw *1 bonus point for a loss by seven points or less *1 bonus point for scoring four or more tries in a match

== Fixtures ==
=== Matchday 1 ===
13 June 2014
16:00 EET (UTC+2)

Emerging Ireland	66 – 0 Abandoned at 49'	Russia
Try: Keatley 3' m Conway (3) 6' c, 23' m, 26' c Annett 10' c Gilroy (2) 28' c, 44' c Copeland 34' c O'Donnell 36' c Marshall 41' c Con: Keatley (5/7) 7', 11', 27', 29', 35'; Hanrahan (3/3) 37', 42', 45'	Report	Pen: Gaysin (0/1) 15'

Referee: Ian Davies (Wales)

FB	15	Johne Murphy
RW	14	Craig Gilroy
OC	13	Eoin Griffin
IC	12	Stuart McCloskey
LW	11	Andrew Conway
FH	10	Ian Keatley	(substituted off) 35'
SH	9	Paul Marshall
N8	8	Robin Copeland
OF	7	Tommy O'Donnell
BF	6	Dominic Ryan (c)
RL	5	Dave Foley
LL	4	Michael Kearney
TP	3	Michael Bent	(substituted off) 46'
HK	2	Niall Annett	(substituted off) 40'
LP	1	Callum Black
Replacements:
HK	16	James Tracy	(substituted on) 40'
PR	17	John Ryan	(substituted on) 46'
LK	18	Billy Holland
FL	19	Sean Dougall
SH	20	Luke McGrath
FH	21	JJ Hanrahan	(substituted on) 35'
CE	22	Brendan Macken
Coach:
(Ireland) Dan McFarland

FB	15	Igor Klyuchnikov
RW	14	Mikhail Babaev
OC	13	German Davydov
IC	12	Alexey Makovetskiy
LW	11	Igor Galinovskiy
FH	10	Ramil Gaysin
SH	9	Alexander Ianiushkin		(substituted off) 46'
N8	8	Victor Gresev
OF	7	Andrey Temnov
BF	6	Andrey Garbuzov
RL	5	Denis Antonov
LL	4	Alexander Voytov (c)		(substituted off) 46'
TP	3	Sergey Sekisov
HK	2	Stanislav Selskiy	(yellow card) 46' to 56'
LP	1	Alexey Volkov		(substituted off) 46'
Replacements:
HK	16	Valery Tsnobiladze
PR	17	Grigory Tsnobiladze		(substituted on) 46'
LK	18	Alexander Bezverkhov
FL	19	Artem Fatakhov		(substituted on) 46'
FL	20	Pavel Butenko
SH	21	Alexey Shcherban		(substituted on) 46'
FH	22	Sergey Ianiushkin
Coach:
(France) Raphaël Saint-André

Touch judges:
Cristian Serban (Romania)
Alexandru Ionescu (Romania)
Television match official:
Razvan Iordachescu (Romania)

13 June 2014
19:00 EET (UTC+2)

Romania	34 – 16	Uruguay
Try: Turashvili 35' c Macovei 45' c Ionita 74' m Con: Vlaicu (2/3) 36', 46'; Pen: Vlaicu (4/4) 5', 11', 53', 58'; Drop: Vlaicu (1/1) 25'	IRB	Try: Gibernau 29' c Con: Prada (1/1) 30'; Pen: Prada (3/4) 24', 26', 61'

Referee: Chris Assmus (Canada)

FB	15	Gabriel Conache
RW	14	Ionuț Dumitru
OC	13	Csaba Gál
IC	12	Florin Vlaicu
LW	11	Florin Ioniță
FH	10	Filip Lazăr	(substituted off) 66'
SH	9	Florin Surugiu	(substituted off) 78'
N8	8	Daniel Carpo
OF	7	Mihai Macovei (c)
BF	6	Viorel Lucaci	(substituted off) 60'
RL	5	Marius Sirbe
LL	4	Valentin Popârlan	(substituted off) 66'
TP	3	Constantin Pristăviță		(substituted off) 75'
HK	2	Otar Turashvili	14' to 23'
LP	1	Horaţiu Pungea	(substituted off) 48'	(substituted on) 75'
Replacements:
HK	16	Eugen Căpăţână	(substituted on) 14'	(substituted off) 23'
PR	17	Alexandru Ţăruş	(substituted on) 48'
LK	18	Dorin Lazăr	(substituted on) 60'
N8	19	Vlad Nistor	(substituted on) 66'
CE	20	Catalin Robert Dascalu	(substituted on) 66'
SH	21	Valentin Ivan	(substituted on) 78'
FH	22	Daniel Statulescu
Coach:
(Wales) Lynn Howells

FB	15	Gastón Mieres
RW	14	Santiago Gibernau
OC	13	Joaquín Prada
IC	12	Alberto Roman
LW	11	Gaston Gibernau		(substituted off) 53'
FH	10	Alejo Durán		(substituted off) 53'
SH	9	Guillermo Lijtenstein
N8	8	Alejandro Nieto
OF	7	Diego Magno		(substituted off) 65'
BF	6	Juan de Freitas		(substituted off) 69'
RL	5	Franco Lamanna	(yellow card) 62' to 72'
LL	4	Cristofer Soares De Lima		(substituted off) 49'
TP	3	Juan Echeverría		(substituted off) 49'	(substituted on) 78'
HK	2	Nicolás Klappenbach (c)		(substituted off) 69'
LP	1	Alejo Corral			(substituted off) 78'
Replacements:
PR	16	Carlos Arboleya		(substituted on) 49'
PR	17	Mateo Sanguinetti		(substituted on) 69'
LK	18	Mathias Braun		(substituted on) 49'
FL	19	Fernando Bascou		(substituted on) 65'
FL	20	Agustin Alonso		(substituted on) 69'
FB	21	Jerónimo Etcheverry		(substituted on) 53'
WG	22	Federico Favaro		(substituted on) 53'
Coach:
(Uruguay) Pablo Lemoine

Touch judges:
Razvan Vasiliu (Romania)
Gabriel Seitan (Romania)
Television match official:
Razvan Iordachescu (Romania)

=== Matchday 2 ===
18 June 2014
16:00 EET (UTC+2)

Emerging Ireland	51 – 3	Uruguay
Try: Gilroy 7' c Kearney 24' c Butler (2) 33' m, 51' c Holland 64' c Marshall 75' m Con: Hanrahan (5/6) 8', 25', 52', 61', 65'; Pen: Hanrahan (2/2) 20', 40'; Keatley (1/1) 80'	Report	Pen: Prada (1/2) 4'

Referee: Marius Mitrea (Italy)

18 June 2014
19:00 EET (UTC+2)

Romania	20 – 18	Russia
Try: Penalty Try 70',78'; Con: Florin Vlaicu (2/2) 71',79'; Pen: Florin Vlaicu (2/2) 8',36'	Report	Try: Andrey Temnov 32', Vladimir Ostroushko 56'; Con: Ramil Gaysin (1/2) 33'; Pen: Ramil Gaysin (2/3) 22',50'

Stadionul Arcul de Triumf, Bucharest
Referee: Chris Assmus

FB	15	Gabriel Conache
RW	14	Stephen Hihetah
OC	13	Catalin Robert Dascalu
IC	12	Florin Vlaicu
LW	11	Ionut Dumitru
FH	10	Filip Lazăr		(substituted off) 50'
SH	9	Florin Surugiu		(substituted off) 64'
N8	8	Daniel Carpo
OF	7	Dorin Lazăr		(substituted off) 48'
BF	6	Mihai Macovei		(c)
RL	5	Marius Sirbe
LL	4	Marian Drenceanu		(substituted off) 45'
TP	3	Alexandru Tarus		(substituted off) 64'
HK	2	Eugen Capatana		(substituted off) 47'	(substituted on) 64'
LP	1	Ionel Badiu		(substituted off) 48'
Replacements:
HK	16	Otar Turashvili		(substituted on) 47'	(substituted off) 64'
PR	17	Horatiu Pungea		(substituted on) 50'
LK	18	Valentin Popârlan	(yellow card) 49' to 59'	(substituted on) 45'
N8	19	Viorel Lucaci	(yellow card) 51' to 61'	(substituted on) 48'
CE	20	Csaba Gál		(substituted on) 50'
SH	21	Valentin Ivan		(substituted on) 50'
FH	22	Andrei Ilie
Coach:
(Wales) Lynn Howells

FB	15	Igor Klyuchnikov		(substituted off) 68'
RW	14	Mikhail Babaev
OC	13	Dmitry Gerasimov
IC	12	Alexey Makovetskiy
LW	11	Vladimir Ostroushko
FH	10	Ramil Gaysin
SH	9	Alexander Ianiushkin		(substituted off) 61'
N8	8	Victor Gresev	(yellow card) 76' to 80 '	(substituted off) 48'
OF	7	Andrey Temnov
BF	6	Pavel Butenko		(substituted off) 64'
RL	5	Artem Fatakhov		(substituted off) 69'
LL	4	Alexander Voytov(c)	(yellow card) 8' to 18'
TP	3	Andrey Igretsov	(yellow card) 45' to 55'	(substituted off) 68'
HK	2	Valery Tsnobiladze	(yellow card) 69' to 79'
LP	1	Grigory Tsnobiladze
Replacements:
PR	16	Stanislav Selskiy		(substituted on) 69'
PR	17	Alexander Bezverkhov		(substituted on) 48'	(substituted off) 55'	(substituted on) 68'	(substituted off) 76'
LK	18	Denis Antonov
FL	19	Yevgeny Matveyev		(substituted on) 64'
FL	20	Igor Galinovskiy		(substituted on) 68'
FB	21	Alexey Shcherban		(substituted on) 61'
WG	22	Sergey Ianiushkin
Coach:
(France) Raphaël Saint-André

Touch judges:
Cristian Serban (Romania)
Bogdan Gordin (Romania)
Television match official:
Razvan Iordachescu (Romania)

=== Matchday 3 ===
22 June 2014
16:00 EET (UTC+2)

Russia	6 – 13	Uruguay
Pen: Kushnarev (2/4) 11', 14'	Report	Try: Lamanna 60' c Con: Prada (1/1) 61'; Pen: Prada (2/5) 52', 77'

Referee: Marius Mitrea (Italy)

22 June 2014
19:00 EET (UTC+2)

Romania	10 – 31	Emerging Ireland
Try: Penalty try 78'; Drop: Florin Vlaicu (1/1) 13'	Report	Try: Dominic Ryan 28' c Craig Gilroy 31' c Robin Copeland 41' c Penalty try 80'; Con: Ian Keatley (3/3) 31', 36', 50'; Pen: Ian Keatley (1/2) 3'

Stadionul Arcul de Triumf
Referee: Ian Davies (Wales)

== Top scorers ==
=== Top points scorers ===
Rank	Player	Team	Points
1	Florin Vlaicu	Romania	32
2	Ian Keatley	Emerging Ireland	27
3	Joaquin Prada	Uruguay	22
4	Craig Gilroy	Emerging Ireland	20
5	Andrew Conway	Emerging Ireland	15
6	JJ Hanrahan	Emerging Ireland	12
7	Robin Copeland	Emerging Ireland	10
7	Paul Marshall	Emerging Ireland	10
9	Ramil Gaysin	Russia	8
10	Yuri Kushnarev	Russia	6

=== Top try scorers ===
Rank	Player	Team	Tries
1	Craig Gilroy	Emerging Ireland	4
2	Andrew Conway	Emerging Ireland	3
3	Robin Copeland	Emerging Ireland	2
3	Paul Marshall	Emerging Ireland	2
5	Niall Annett	Emerging Ireland	1
5	Santiago Gibernau	Uruguay	1
5	Florin Ionita	Romania	1
5	Ian Keatley	Emerging Ireland	1
5	Mihai Macovei	Romania	1
5	Tommy O'Donnell	Emerging Ireland	1
5	Dominic Ryan	Emerging Ireland	1
5	Otar Turashvili	Romania	1
5	Franco Lamanna	Uruguay	1
5	Andrey Temnov	Russia	1
5	Vladimir Ostroushko	Russia	1

== See also ==
- 2014 IRB Pacific Nations Cup
- 2014 IRB Tbilisi Cup
