= Filip Lazăr =

Filip Lazăr may refer to:

- Filip Lazăr (musician) (1894–1936), Romanian composer and pianist
- Filip Lazăr (rugby union) (born 1990), Romanian rugby union player
