= Robin Copeland =

Irish rugby union player (born 1987)

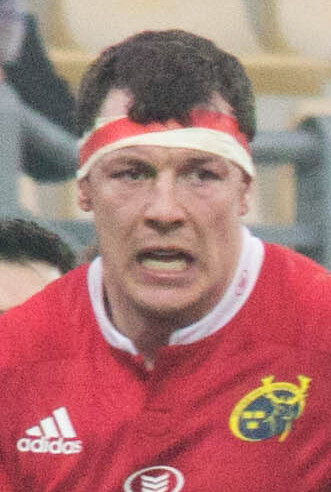
- Copeland in 2016
- Born: 23 October 1987 (age 39) Wexford, Ireland
- Height: 1.96 m (6 ft 5 in)
- Weight: 110 kg (17 st; 240 lb)
- School: Kilkenny College
- University: Dublin Business School

Rugby union career
- Position(s): Number 8, Flanker, Lock
Amateur team(s)
Years	Team	Apps	(Points)
20??–2010	St Mary's College		
Senior career
Years	Team	Apps	(Points)
2010–2011	Plymouth Albion	20	(15)
2011–2012	Rotherham Titans	26	(65)
2012–2014	Cardiff Blues	53	(40)
2014–2018	Munster	71	(60)
2018–2020	Connacht	18	(5)
2020–	Soyaux Angoulême	28	(5)
- Correct as of 19 September 2021
International career
Years	Team	Apps	(Points)
2014	Ireland Wolfhounds	1	(0)
2014	Emerging Ireland	3	(10)
2014	Ireland	1	(0)
- Correct as of 17 November 2014

Robin Copeland (born 23 October 1987) is an Irish rugby union player for Soyaux Angoulême. He plays primarily as a number 8, but has occasionally played as a flanker and lock.

== Career ==
=== Cardiff Blues ===
Copeland joined Cardiff Blues at the beginning of the 2012–13 season.

=== Munster ===
Copeland joined Irish province Munster in July 2014 on a two-year contract. He made his debut for Munster on 12 September 2014, starting against Benetton. He scored his first try for Munster in the game against Leinster on 4 October 2014. He came on against Saracens in Round 2 of the Champions Cup on 24 October 2014. Copeland was ruled out for the remainder of the 2014–15 season in February 2015, following a shoulder injury that required stabilisation surgery. He made his return on 5 September 2015. In December 2015, Copeland signed a two-year contract extension with Munster. On 11 November 2016, Copeland won the Man-of-the-Match award in Munster's historic 27–14 win against the Māori All Blacks. Copeland left Munster at the end of the 2017–18 season.

=== Connacht ===
Copeland joined Munster's Pro14 rivals Connacht on a two-year contract at the beginning of the 2018–19 season.

=== Soyaux Angoulême ===
Copeland joined French Pro D2 club Soyaux Angoulême on a three-year contract from the 2020–21 season.

== Ireland ==
On 14 January 2014, Copeland was named in the preliminary 44-man squad for the 2014 Six Nations Championship. He made his debut for Ireland Wolfhounds when he started for them in their friendly against England Saxons on 25 January 2014. On 27 January 2014, Copeland was named in Ireland's 34-man squad for the opening two fixtures of the 2014 Six Nations Championship. Copeland was selected in the Emerging Ireland squad on 26 May 2014. He started against Russia in their first 2014 IRB Nations Cup match on 13 June 2014, scoring a try. Copeland came off the bench in their second game against Uruguay on 18 June 2014. He started in the 31–10 win Romania on 22 June 2014, scoring a try in the win that secured the 2014 IRB Nations Cup for Emerging Ireland. Copeland was named Player of the Tournament for the 2014 IRB Nations Cup. Copeland made his senior debut for Ireland on 16 November 2014, coming off the bench in the 49–7 win against Georgia during the 2014 November Tests.

== Honours ==
=== Munster A ===
- British and Irish Cup
  - Winner (1): (2016–17)

=== Emerging Ireland ===
- World Rugby Nations Cup
  - Winner (1): (2014)
