= JJ Hanrahan =

Irish rugby union player (born 1992)

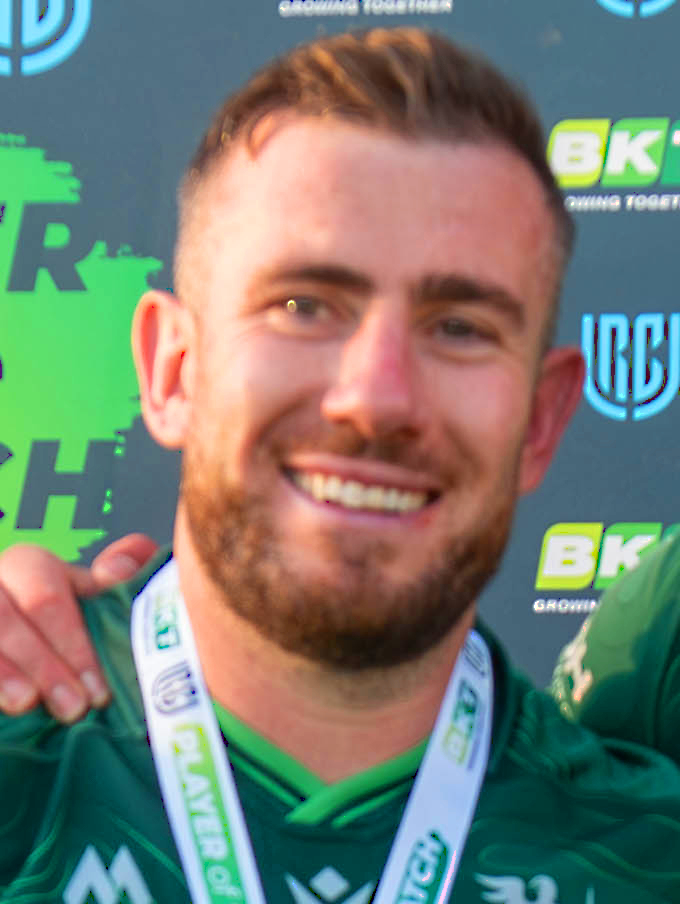
- Hanrahan in 2025
- Born: John Joseph Hanrahan; 27 July 1992 (age 34) Currow, Ireland
- Height: 1.81 m (5 ft 11 1/2 in)
- Weight: 92 kg (14.5 st; 203 lb)
- School: Rockwell College

Rugby union career
- Position(s): Fly-half, Centre, Fullback
Amateur team(s)
Years	Team	Apps	(Points)
- Castleisland RFC
- UL Bohemians
Senior career
Years	Team	Apps	(Points)
2012–2015	Munster	64	(264)
2015–2017	Northampton Saints	30	(69)
2017–2021	Munster	77	(471)
2021–2022	Clermont	23	(46)
2022–2023	Dragons	15	(88)
2023–2025	Connacht	23	(145)
2025-	Munster	23	(64)
- Correct as of 31 October 2026
International career
Years	Team	Apps	(Points)
2011–2012	Ireland U20	16	(61)
2014–2015	Emerging Ireland	5	(17)
- Correct as of 26 October 2016

John Joseph Hanrahan (born 27 July 1992) is an Irish rugby union player who plays for Munster in the United Rugby Championship. He plays primarily as a fly-half, but can also play as a centre or fullback.

== Early years ==
Hanrahan began playing rugby with Castleisland RFC in County Kerry at the age of 7. He attended Rockwell College, moving there after being spotted playing for Castleisland in a Munster Under-16 final, and he scored a winning drop-goal for Rockwell in their 2010 semi-final, before losing the 2010 Munster Schools Rugby Senior Cup Final to Presentation Brothers College, Cork.

== Club career ==
=== Munster ===
Hanrahan made his first senior appearance for Munster against La Rochelle in a non-capped pre-season friendly on 12 August 2011. He was part of the Munster A team that won the 2012 British and Irish Cup. He was promoted to a professional contract by Munster for the 2012–13 season. He made his full debut for Munster on 22 September 2012, in a Pro12 fixture against Dragons. Hanrahan made his Heineken Cup debut on 21 October 2012, coming on as a replacement in Munster's second round fixture against Edinburgh at Thomond Park. He made his start for Munster on 26 October 2012, in a Pro12 game against Zebre, scoring two tries and winning the Man-of-the-Match award. Hanrahan signed a two-year contract extension with Munster in January 2013.

In his first start of the 2013–14 season, against Zebre on 13 September 2013, Hanrahan scored 21 points in a Man-of-the-match-winning performance. Hanrahan came off the bench against Edinburgh in Round 1 of the 2013–14 Heineken Cup on 12 October 2013. He came off the bench against Gloucester in Round 2 on 19 October 2013. On 25 October 2013, Hanrahan scored all of Munster's points 6–13 win against Glasgow Warriors in another Man-of-the-Match performance. Hanrahan scored the winning try in Munster's 17–18 win against Perpignan in Round 4 of the 2013–14 Heineken Cup on 14 December 2013. He was named Man-of-the-Match in Munster's 16–10 win against Scarlets on 21 December 2013, scoring 11 points and setting up Ronan O'Mahony's match-winning try with a crucial cross-field kick in injury time. He scored all of Munster's points in their 22–16 win against Connacht on 27 December 2013. Hanrahan scored 24-points in Munster's 54–13 win against Cardiff Blues on 8 February 2014. He came on against Toulouse in Munster's 47–23 Heineken Cup quarter-final win on 5 April 2014. He suffered a groin injury in Munster's game against Glasgow Warriors on 12 April 2013, which ruled him out the inter-provincial derby against Connacht on 19 April 2014. Hanrahan's match-winning try against Perpignan in Round 4 of the Heineken Cup was nominated for the IRUPA Try of the Year 2014 award on 23 April 2014. He came off the bench in Munster's 24–16 semi-final defeat to Toulon on 27 April 2014. Hanrahan won the Munster Young Player of the Year Award on 8 May 2014. Hanrahan also won the 2013–14 Pro12 Golden Boot Award for his 88.71% place kick conversion rate.

Hanrahan scored 21 points against Cardiff Blues on 1 November 2014. He started at fullback against Dragons on 21 November 2014. He scored 18 points and won the Man-of-the-Match award in Munster's 33–16 win against Cardiff Blues on 14 February 2015. Hanrahan scored a late try to help Munster secure a 25–25 draw with Scarlets on 21 February 2015. Hanrahan made his final appearance for Munster on 30 May 2015, coming off the bench in their 31–13 2015 Pro12 Grand Final defeat against Glasgow Warriors.

=== Northampton Saints ===
On 7 January 2015, it was confirmed that Hanrahan would leave Munster at the end of the 2014–15 season to join English Premiership side Northampton Saints. Hanrahan made his debut for Northampton on 24 October 2015, coming off the bench to replace the injured George Pisi in Saints' 42–16 win against Newcastle Falcons. He started for Northampton in their opening 2015–16 European Rugby Champions Cup pool game against Scarlets on 14 November 2015, scoring 5 points in his team's 15–11 win. Hanrahan's Saints career was plagued with injury however, and he only made 31 appearances for the side in the two seasons he was at the club.

=== Return to Munster ===
On 24 January 2017, it was announced that, after two seasons with Northampton, Hanrahan would be returning to Munster on a two-year contract, beginning at the conclusion of the 2016–17 season. He made his competitive return for Munster on 30 September 2017, coming off the bench against Cardiff Blues in Round 5 of the 2017–18 Pro14 and scoring two tries in the provinces 39–16 win.

Hanrahan converted all 7 tries and won the Man-of-the-Match award in Munster's 49–6 win against Dragons on 3 November 2017. Hanrahan started at fly-half in Munster's 2018–19 Pro14 opening win against South African side Cheetahs on 1 September 2018, scoring one try and four conversions in the provinces 38–0 victory. He signed a two-year contract extension with Munster in December 2018, a deal that will see him remain with the province until at least June 2021. Hanrahan scored 20 points, including one try, three conversions and three penalties, and earned the Man-of-the-Match award in Munster's 30–5 Champions Cup pool two win against French side Castres on 9 December 2018, having been a late call-up to the starting XV after Joey Carbery reported a tight hamstring before the game.

Hanrahan won his 100th cap for Munster in their fixture against Italian side Benetton on 12 April 2019, scoring 17 points, including four conversions and three penalties, and winning the Man-of-the-Match award in the provinces 37–28 away win. Hanrahan scored the match-winning penalty in the 76th minute to secure a 15–13 victory against Benetton in their league quarter-final on 4 May 2019. Hanrahan won the 2019–20 Pro14 Golden Boot award for the best kicker in the competition, ending the regular season with a 90.91% success rate. This was the second time he had won the accolade, having previously won it in the 2013–14 season.

In round two of the 2020–21 Champions Cup on 19 December 2020, Hanrahan scored 24 points off the kicking tee for Munster in their 39–31 away win against French side Clermont. At one point during the first-half, Clermont had been 28–9 ahead, but penalties from Hanrahan kept Munster ticking over on the scoreboard before their comeback win in France. In Munster's rescheduled 2020–21 Pro14 round 5 fixture away to Italian side Benetton on 30 January 2021, Hanrahan came off the bench to replace Ben Healy and scored an 81st minute drop-goal to earn an 18–16 win for Munster. Hanrahan's try in Munster's 38–27 win against Cardiff Blues in round 3 of the 2020–21 Pro14 on 26 October 2020 won the Try of the Season award with both Eir Sport and Rugby Players Ireland.

=== Clermont Auvergne ===
Hanrahan joined French Top 14 club Clermont on a one-year contract, with the option of a second year, ahead of the 2021–22 season. He made his competitive debut for the club in their opening fixture of the 2021–22 Top 14 season away to Lyon on 5 September 2021, starting at fly-half and scoring a try in Clermont's 28–19 defeat.

=== Dragons ===
Hanrahan moved to Wales to join Newport-based club Dragons on a three-year contract from the 2022–23 season, and made his senior competitive debut for the club in their 44–6 defeat against Edinburgh in round one of the 2022–23 United Rugby Championship on 17 September 2022, starting and scoring all of Dragons' points from two penalties. Hanrahan scored 18 points off the kicking tee in the Dragons' 23–17 home win against his former club Munster in round two of the URC on 25 September 2022, helping his new club to their first win against the province in seven years.

=== Connacht ===
Hanrahan was released early from his contract with the Dragons and returned to Ireland to join Connacht ahead of the 2023–24 season.

=== Second Return to Munster ===
In March 2025 it was confirmed that Hanrahan would rejoin Munster for a third spell, with a two-year deal from July 2025 to June 2027.

== Ireland ==
=== Under-20s ===
Hanrahan made his debut for Ireland Under-20 on 11 February 2011 against France Under-20, during the 2011 Under-20 Six Nations Championship. He played at the 2011 Junior World Championship. In June 2012, he was fly-half for Ireland Under-20 in a famous win at the 2012 U-20 IRB Junior World Championship against hosts South Africa Under-20. Hanrahan again played a crucial role at fly-half in Ireland Under-20s victories against England Under-20s and France Under-20s, wins that saw Ireland Under-20 finish 5th at the 2012 competition, their best ever finish at the time. For his performances at the Junior World Championship, and throughout 2012, Hanrahan was nominated for the IRB Junior Player of the Year Award 2012.

=== Emerging Ireland ===
Hanrahan was selected in the Emerging Ireland squad on 26 May 2014. He came off the bench against Russia in their first 2014 IRB Nations Cup match on 13 June 2014, scoring 6 points. He started in their second game against Uruguay on 18 June 2014, scoring 13 points. Hanrahan came off the bench in the 31–10 win Romania on 22 June 2014, a win that secured the 2014 IRB Nations Cup for Emerging Ireland.

Hanrahan was named in the Emerging Ireland squad for the 2015 World Rugby Tbilisi Cup on 19 May 2015. He scored 5 points in Emerging Ireland's opening 25–0 win against Emerging Italy on 13 June 2015. He also started and scored 15 points off the tee in the 45–12 win against Georgia on 21 June 2015, a win which secured the tournament for Emerging Ireland.

== Honours ==
=== Munster ===
- United Rugby Championship
  - Runner Up (2): 2014–15, 2020–21

=== Munster A ===
- British and Irish Cup
  - Winner (1): 2011–12

=== Emerging Ireland ===
- World Rugby Nations Cup
  - Winner (1): 2014
- World Rugby Tbilisi Cup
  - Winner (1): 2015
