= Andrei Ilie =

Romanian rugby union footballer

- Full name: Andrei-Daniel Ilie
- Born: 22 May 1990 (age 36) Bucharest, Romania
- Height: 1.82 m (5 ft 11 1/2 in)
- Weight: 88 kg (13 st 12 lb; 194 lb)

Rugby union career
- Position(s): Centre, wing
Senior career
Years	Team	Apps	(Points)
20??–11	CSM București		
2011–12	Farul Constanța		
2012–13	Dinamo București		
2013–15	Farul Constanța	12	(5)
- Correct as of 22 April 2020
Provincial / State sides
Years	Team	Apps	(Points)
2014–15	București Wolves	4	(0)
- Correct as of 22 April 2020
International career
Years	Team	Apps	(Points)
2014–present	Romania	1	(0)
- Correct as of 22 April 2020

Andrei-Daniel Ilie (born 22 May 1990) is a Romanian rugby union footballer. He plays as a centre or wing. He most recently played for professional SuperLiga club, Farul Constanța.

== Club career ==
During his career, Andrei Ilie played for CSM București, Farul Constanța, Dinamo București and once again for Farul Constanța.

=== Provincial / State sides ===
Ilie was also selected between 2014 and 2015 for the State side assembled to play in the European Cups, namely București Wolves.

== International career ==
Ilie is also selected for Romania's national team, the Oaks, making his international debut during the 2014 IRB Nations Cup in a test match against Emerging Ireland.
