= Jerry Holland =

Jerry Holland may refer to:

- Jerry Holland (musician) (1955–2009), Canadian fiddler
- Jerry Holland (rugby union) (1955–2022), Irish rugby union player and coach
- Jerry Holland (ice hockey) (born 1954), Canadian ice hockey player
