= Sean Dougall =

Irish rugby union player

- Born: 28 October 1989 (age 37) Perth, Scotland
- Height: 1.86 m (6 ft 1 in)
- Weight: 108 kg (17.0 st; 238 lb)
- School: Barnard Castle School
- University: Setanta College

Rugby union career
- Position: Flanker
Amateur team(s)
Years	Team	Apps	(Points)
- West Hartlepool Juniors Malone
Senior career
Years	Team	Apps	(Points)
2010–2012	Rotherham	47	(13)
2012–2015	Munster	42	(30)
2015–2019	Pau	73	(30)
2019–2021	Roval Drôme XV	16	(10)
- Correct as of 6 March 2022
International career
Years	Team	Apps	(Points)
2014	Emerging Ireland	2	(0)
- Correct as of 23 June 2014
Coaching career
- Years: Team
- 2021–: La Rochelle

Sean Dougall (born 28 October 1989) is an Irish former rugby union player, and current coach. He played primarily as an openside Flanker but could also play blindside or No.8. Dougall is currently the contact skills coach at La Rochelle in the French Top 14.

== Professional career ==
=== Ulster ===
Dougall joined the Ulster academy in 2008 and was a member for two years.

=== Rotherham ===
Dougall left Ulster for English side Rotherham, joining in 2010. He captained Rotherham whenever Sam Dickinson, the usual captain, was unavailable. After signing a deal to join Munster for the 2012–13 season, Dougall played his last game for Rotherham against Bedford Blues on 21 April 2012.

=== Munster ===
On 16 March 2012, it was announced that Irish province, and two-time European champions, Munster had signed Dougall on a one-year contract for the 2012–13 season. Speaking ahead of his move to Munster, Dougall talked about the competition for places in the Munster back-row and the opportunity this gives him.

"The chance to train and play with the likes of David Wallace is another great opportunity and will improve aspects of my game as well as hopefully adding attributes that I never had before. To play for a team like Munster has always been an aspiration of mine. With the culture and ethos they have over there I knew it was a fantastic opportunity"

Dougall made his full Munster debut on 1 September 2012, in their opening 2012–13 Pro12 league fixture against Edinburgh. He made his European Rugby Champions Cup debut on 13 October 2012, in Munster's opening fixture away to Racing 92. Dougall also scored his first try for Munster in this game. In January 2013, Dougall agreed a two-year contract extension with Munster. Dougall started in Munster's 24–16 semi-final defeat to Toulon on 27 April 2014.

=== Pau ===
On 30 January 2015, it was announced that Dougall would be joining French Rugby Pro D2 side Pau after the 2014–15 season, having decided not to renew his contract with Munster. In May 2017, it was announced that Dougall had signed a two-year contract extension with Pau.

=== Valence Romans Drôme Rugby ===
After four seasons at Pau, Dougall joined another French club, Valence Romans Drôme Rugby, who had been promoted from Fédérale 1 to the Rugby Pro D2 for the 2019–20 season.

=== Stade Rochelais ===
Upon retiring from playing, Dougall signed with La Rochelle as Strength and Conditioning Assistant Coach for the Professional and Academy teams for the 2021-22 season where Dougall’s former Munster teammate Ronan O'Gara was director of rugby. Stade Rochelais went on to win the European Champions Cup 2021-22. In May 2022, Dougall signed a further two year contract with the La Rochelle as Contact skills conditioning coach for the Professional, Academy and Youth team.

== Ireland ==
Dougall played for Ireland U18 and Ireland U19 and stated a desire to play for Ireland's senior national team. He was selected in the Emerging Ireland squad on 26 May 2014. Dougall started in their second game against Uruguay on 18 June 2014. He also started in the 31–10 win Romania on 22 June 2014, a win that secured the 2014 IRB Nations Cup for Emerging Ireland.

== Honours ==
=== Emerging Ireland ===
- World Rugby Nations Cup
  - Winner (1): (2014)
