= John Ryan (rugby union, born 1988) =

Irish rugby union player

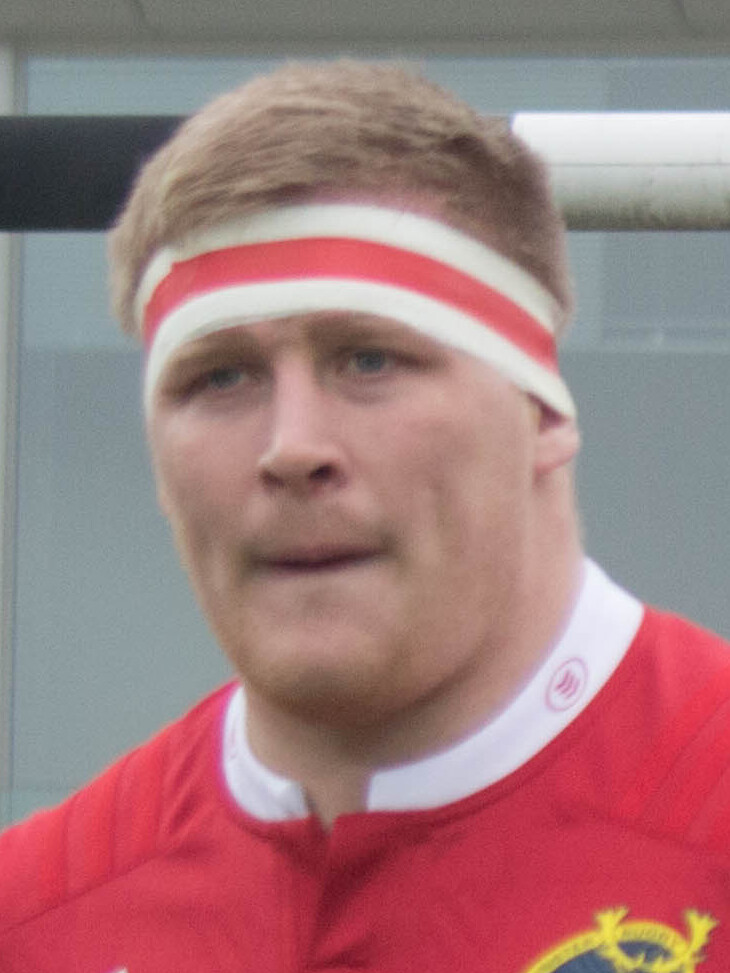
- Ryan in 2016
- Born: John William Ryan; 2 August 1988 (age 38) Berrings, Ireland
- Height: 1.83 m (6 ft 0 in)
- Weight: 120 kg (19 st; 260 lb)
- School: Christian Brothers College
- University: University College Cork; Limerick Institute of Technology

Rugby union career
- Position: Prop
Amateur team(s)
Years	Team	Apps	(Points)
2007–2011	UCC		
2011–2022	Cork Constitution		
Senior career
Years	Team	Apps	(Points)
2011–2022	Munster	197	(25)
2012	→ London Irish (loan)	2	(0)
2022	Wasps	4	(0)
2022–2023	Munster	8	(5)
2023	Chiefs	17	(0)
2023–	Munster	52	(0)
- Correct as of 04 April 2026
International career
Years	Team	Apps	(Points)
2013–2014	Emerging Ireland	3	(0)
2016–2021	Ireland	24	(5)
2022	Barbarians	3	(0)
- Correct as of 20 November 2022

John William Ryan (born 2 August 1988) is an Irish rugby union player who plays as a prop for United Rugby Championship club Munster.

== Early career ==
From Berrings, Cork and educated at Christian Brothers College, Ryan played schools rugby for Christian Brothers and represented Munster at Schools, U19, U20 and Academy level. In 2010 and 2011, he also played for the International Club XV.

== Club career ==
=== Munster ===
Ryan joined the Munster senior squad in 2010–11. He made his Munster senior debut against Cardiff Blues on 23 September 2011. Ryan signed a contract extension with the province in March 2012. He won the 2011–12 British and Irish Cup with Munster A on 27 April 2012. He made his Heineken Cup debut for Munster on 20 January 2013, as a replacement against Racing 92. In January 2016, Munster announced that Ryan had signed a three-year contract extension with the province.

On 17 September 2016, Ryan was named Man-of-the-Match against Dragons at Rodney Parade. On 1 April 2017, Ryan scored a try and won the Man-of-the-Match award in Munster's 41–16 2016–17 European Rugby Champions Cup quarter-final victory against Toulouse. On 25 April 2017, it was announced that Ryan had been nominated by his teammates for the 2017 Munster Rugby Senior Player of the Year, alongside Niall Scannell and Tyler Bleyendaal. On 5 May 2017, Ryan was named in the 2016–17 Pro12 Dream Team. Ryan earned his 100th cap for Munster on 16 September 2017, when he was used as a replacement in the provinces win against Ospreys in round 3 of the 2017–18 Pro14.

He signed a three-year contract extension with Munster in December 2018. Ryan won his 150th cap for Munster during their 15–6 defeat against Saracens during round 4 of the 2019–20 Champions Cup on 14 December 2019. He left Munster at the end of the 2021–22 season.

=== Loan to London Irish ===
Ryan joined English Premiership side London Irish on a short-term loan on 27 August 2012. He played twice for the club, replacing Leo Halavatau on both occasions against Gloucester and Wasps.

=== Wasps ===
Ryan joined English Premiership Rugby club Wasps from the 2022–23 season. Wasps entered administration on 17 October 2022 and Ryan was made redundant along with all other players and coaching staff.

=== Return to Munster ===
Following Wasps' administration and the news that Stephen Archer would require ankle surgery, Ryan returned to Munster on a three-month contract announced in late October 2022. Ryan made his 'second' debut for Munster in their 15–14 defeat against provincial rivals Ulster in round seven of the 2022–23 United Rugby Championship on 29 October 2022. He earned his 200th cap for Munster in their 2022–23 United Rugby Championship round nine fixture against Edinburgh on 2 December 2022, starting in the province's 38–17 away win, and earned his 50th Champions Cup cap for Munster in their 18–13 home defeat against Toulouse in round one of the 2022–23 Champions Cup on 11 December 2022. Ryan was unavailable for Munster's final fixture of January 2023 away to Benetton, bringing to an end his second stint with the province.

=== Chiefs ===
After Angus Ta'avao was ruled out of the 2023 Super Rugby Pacific season due to a neck injury, New Zealand team the Chiefs signed Ryan for the duration of the season. Ryan made his debut for the Chiefs as a 63rd minute replacement for George Dyer in their 31–10 away win against defending champions Crusaders in round one of the tournament on 24 February 2023.

=== Third spell with Munster ===
Ryan returned to Munster after the completion of his time with the Chiefs in New Zealand, joining his home province on a one-year contract for the 2023–24 season. After two additional one-year extensions, it was announced in April 2026 that he would retire at the end of the season.

== International career ==
=== Ireland ===
Ryan was named in the Emerging Ireland squad to take part in the 2013 IRB Tbilisi Cup on 19 May 2013. Ryan was again selected in the Emerging Ireland squad when it was announced on 26 May 2014. He came off the bench against Russia in their first 2014 IRB Nations Cup match on 13 June 2014. He started in their second game against Uruguay on 18 June 2014. Ryan started in the 31–10 win Romania on 22 June 2014, a win that secured the 2014 IRB Nations Cup for Emerging Ireland.

Ryan was named in Ireland's squad for the 2016 end-of-year rugby union internationals, his first senior squad call-up. On 12 November 2016, Ryan made his senior Ireland debut when he came on as a replacement in the 52–21 win against Canada. Ryan was named in the Ireland squad for the 2017 Six Nations Championship. He came off the bench for Ireland in all 5 games of the tournament. Ryan was also selected in the squad for the 2017 Summer Tour against the United States and Japan. On 10 June 2017, Ryan made his first start for Ireland, doing so in the one-off test against the United States in the Red Bull Arena, New Jersey, before starting both test victories against Japan.

He featured off the bench in Ireland's wins against South Africa and Argentina during the 2017 Autumn Internationals. Ryan made two appearances for Ireland as they won a Grand Slam during the 2018 Six Nations Championship, featuring off the bench against France and Wales. He started in the first test and came off the bench during the third in Ireland's historic series victory against Australia in June 2018. Ryan scored his first try for Ireland in their 57–14 win against the United States during the 2018 Autumn Tests on 24 November 2018.

Ryan was selected in the 31-man Ireland squad for the 2019 Rugby World Cup, having featured in the warm-up matches against Italy and Wales. Ryan's only appearance during the world cup itself was a start in Ireland's 35–0 win against Russia during the pool stage. During the Autumn Nations Cup, Ryan featured off the bench in Ireland's 23–10 win against Georgia on 29 November, and the 31–16 win against Scotland on 5 December, which secured a third-place finish for Ireland in the tournament., and Ryan was again used as a replacement in Ireland's 39–31 victory against Japan during the 2021 July rugby union tests.

=== Barbarians ===
Ryan was selected in the Barbarians squad to face an All Blacks XV on 13 November and Harlequins RFC as part of the 2022 Autumn Nations Series. Ryan's former Munster teammate Ronan O'Gara coached the Barbarians in the former match, with Ryan starting in the Barbarians' 35–31 win. Ryan also started in the Barbarians' 31–30 win against Premiership Rugby side Bath on 20 November.

== Statistics ==
=== International analysis by opposition ===
Against	Played	Won	Lost	Drawn	Tries	Points	% Won
Argentina	1	1	0	0	0	0	100
Australia	2	1	1	0	0	0	50
Canada	1	1	0	0	0	0	100
England	1	1	0	0	0	0	100
France	3	3	0	0	0	0	100
Georgia	1	1	0	0	0	0	100
Italy	3	3	0	0	0	0	100
Japan	3	3	0	0	0	0	100
Russia	1	1	0	0	0	0	100
Scotland	2	1	1	0	0	0	50
South Africa	1	1	0	0	0	0	100
United States	2	2	0	0	1	5	100
Wales	3	2	1	0	0	0	66.67
Total	24	21	3	0	1	5	87.5

Correct as of 3 July 2021

== Honours ==
=== Munster A ===
- British and Irish Cup
  - Winner (1): (2011–12)

=== Munster ===
- United Rugby Championship
  - Winner (1): 2022–23

=== Emerging Ireland ===
- World Rugby Nations Cup
  - Winner (1): (2014)

=== Ireland ===
- Six Nations Championship:
  - Winner (1): 2018
- Grand Slam:
  - Winner (1): 2018
- Triple Crown:
  - Winner (1): 2018
