= James Cronin (rugby union) =

Irish rugby union player (born 1990)

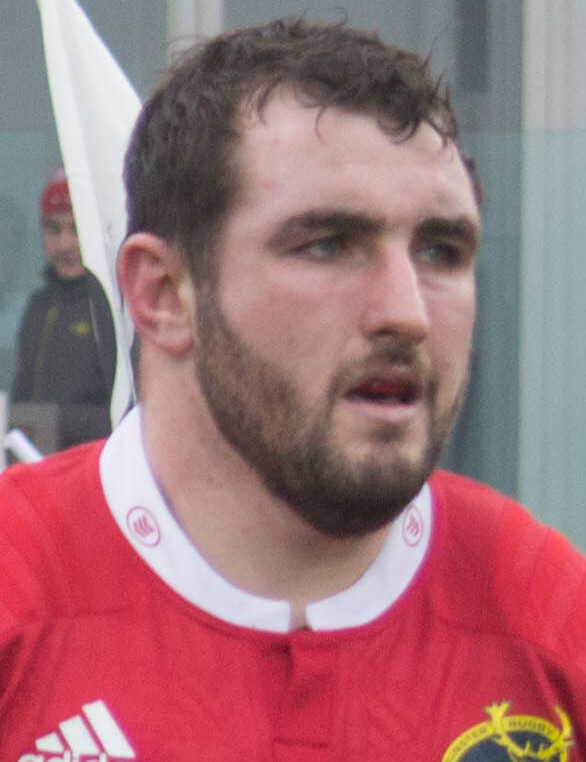
- Cronin in 2016
- Born: 23 November 1990 (age 35) Ballincollig, Cork, Ireland
- Height: 1.83 m (6 ft 0 in)
- Weight: 116 kg (18 st 4 lb)

Rugby union career
- Position: Prop
Youth career
- Ballincollig
Amateur team(s)
Years	Team	Apps	(Points)
- Dolphin
- Highfield
Senior career
Years	Team	Apps	(Points)
2013–2021	Munster	143	(100)
2021–2022	Biarritz	14	(5)
2022–2025	Leicester Tigers	50	(35)
- Correct as of 15 June 2025
International career
Years	Team	Apps	(Points)
2014–2016	Ireland	3	(0)
2015	Emerging Ireland	2	(0)
2017	Barbarians	1	(0)
- Correct as of 19 May 2025

James Cronin (born 23 November 1990) is an Irish rugby union player. He previously represented his native province of Munster in the URC, French club Biarritz in the Top 14 and for Leicester Tigers in England's Premiership Rugby. He plays as a prop and represented Highfield in the All-Ireland League.

== Early life ==
Cronin began playing rugby in Ballincollig before moving to Highfield to play at under-18 level, where he won Munster and All-Ireland titles.

== Career ==
=== Munster ===
Cronin made his debut for Munster A on 8 December 2012, starting against Rotherham Titans in the British and Irish Cup. Whilst in year two of the Munster Academy, he was promoted to a development contract with the senior Munster squad for the 2013–14 season. Cronin made his debut for the senior Munster team on 13 April 2013, coming on as a replacement against Leinster in a Pro12 fixture. He won the John McCarthy Award for Munster Academy Player of the Year for the 2012–13 season on 10 May 2013.

Cronin scored his first try for Munster against Edinburgh on 7 September 2013, in a game that was also his first start. He came off the bench in Munster's opening 2013–14 Heineken Cup fixture against Edinburgh on 12 October 2013. He was a replacement in the Round 2 win against Gloucester on 19 October 2013. Cronin was a replacement again in the Round 3 game against Perpignan on 8 December 2013. He made his first Heineken Cup start on 14 December 2013, against Perpignan in Round 4. Cronin signed a new two-year contract with Munster in January 2014. He came off the bench against Gloucester on 11 January 2014 during the 7–20 Munster win that secured quarter-final qualification. Cronin came off the bench against Edinburgh in the Round 6 38–6 win on 19 January 2014 that secured a home quarter-final. He came off the bench in Munster's 24–16 semi-final defeat to Toulon on 27 April 2014.

Cronin scored a try against Leinster in Munster's 23–34 win on 4 October 2014. Cronin came on in Munster's first European Rugby Champions Cup game against Sale Sharks on 18 October 2014. He started against Saracens in Round 2 of the Champions Cup on 24 October 2014. Cronin was ruled out for at least 6 weeks with an ankle injury sustained during the Saracens game. He came off the bench against Clermont Auvergne on 6 December 2014. Cronin started against Saracens on 17 January 2015. He started the final pool game against Sale Sharks on 25 January 2015.

He came off the bench in Munster's opening 2015–16 European Rugby Champions Cup pool game against Benetton on 14 November 2015. Cronin started against Leicester Tigers on 12 December 2015. In January 2016, Cronin signed a three-year contract extension with Munster, which will see him remain with the province until at least June 2019. In October 2016, Cronin was banned for 4 weeks after being found guilty of stamping on the head of an opponent during Munster's game against Leinster on 8 October. On 23 January 2017, Cronin was ruled out for 6–8 weeks following surgery on a thumb injury sustained in Munster's win against Racing 92 on 21 January. Cronin won his 100th cap for Munster during their 24–24 draw with Ulster in round 21 of the 2017–18 Pro14 season on 28 April 2018, a fixture in which he won the Man-of-the-Match award.

He signed a two-year contract extension with Munster in October 2018, a deal that will see him remain with the province until at least June 2021. Cronin made his return from injury for Munster in their opening 39–9 victory against Welsh side Dragons in the 2019–20 Pro14 on 28 September 2019, his first competitive appearance since November 2018.

Cronin was given a one-month ban in April 2020 due to an unintentional doping violation. He had been unwell in the buildup to Munster's 2019–20 Champions Cup round 2 match against Racing 92 on 23 November 2019, and had been prescribed antibiotics by Munster's team doctor. However, when Cronin collected the prescription, he was mistakenly given the prescription for a different person with the same name by the pharmacy. When selected for an in-competition anti-doping test following the match, Cronin tested positive for two banned substances: prednisolone and prednisone, neither of which Cronin had a therapeutic use exemption for. Though the independent judicial officer found that there "was no significant fault on behalf of the player, and that there were clear and compelling mitigating factors", it was determined that Cronin bore some responsibility for his failed test.

Cronin was released by Munster at the end of the 2020–21 season. His final appearance for the province was in their 31–27 win against Cardiff Blues in round 4 of the Pro14 Rainbow Cup on 28 May 2021.

=== Biarritz ===
Following his release by Munster, Cronin joined French club Biarritz, who had recently been promoted back to the Top 14, ahead of the 2021–22 season. Cronin joined former Munster teammates Dave O'Callaghan, James Hart and Francis Saili at the club, where Billy Scannell, younger brother of Munster's Niall and Rory, was also on the books.

=== Leicester Tigers ===
Cronin joined English Gallagher Premiership club Leicester Tigers from the 2022–23 season.

== Ireland ==
Cronin was named in the Ireland squad for their 2014 Tour to Argentina on 19 May 2014. He came off the bench in the second test against Argentina on 14 June 2014 to make his Ireland debut. Ireland won the game 23–17. He was named in the Ireland squad for the 2014 November Tests on 21 October 2014.

Cronin was named in the Ireland squad for the opening rounds of the 2015 Six Nations Championship on 1 February 2015. He came off the bench against Italy on 7 February 2015. Cronin suffered a knee injury during the game which required a minor surgical procedure. He was named in the Emerging Ireland squad for the 2015 World Rugby Tbilisi Cup on 19 May 2015. Cronin started in the 33–7 win against Uruguay on 17 June 2015. He also started in the 45–12 win against Georgia on 21 June 2015, a win which secured the tournament for Emerging Ireland.

On 20 January 2016, Cronin was named in Ireland's 35-man squad for the 2016 Six Nations Championship. On 13 February 2016, Cronin came off the bench against France in Ireland's second game of the Six Nations.

== Honours ==
=== Emerging Ireland ===
- World Rugby Tbilisi Cup
  - Winner (1): (2015)
