= Andrew Conway =

Irish rugby union player (born 1991)

- Born: Andrew Joseph Conway; 11 July 1991 (age 35) Dublin, Ireland
- Height: 1.80 m (5 ft 11 in)
- Weight: 90 kg (14 st; 200 lb)
- School: Blackrock College

Rugby union career
- Position(s): Wing, Fullback
Amateur team(s)
Years	Team	Apps	(Points)
20??–2013	Blackrock College		
2013–	Garryowen		
Senior career
Years	Team	Apps	(Points)
2010–2013	Leinster	42	(40)
2013–2023	Munster	150	(250)
- Correct as of 21 October 2023
International career
Years	Team	Apps	(Points)
2009	Ireland Schools	1	(0)
2010–2011	Ireland U20	16	(70)
2014–2015	Emerging Ireland	6	(30)
2015	Ireland Wolfhounds	1	(0)
2017–2022	Ireland	30	(75)
- Correct as of 12 March 2022

Andrew Joseph Conway (born 11 July 1991) is a former Irish rugby union player who played as a wing or fullback for United Rugby Championship club Munster.

== Blackrock College ==
While attending Blackrock College, Conway helped the school win both the Leinster Schools Junior Cup and the Leinster Schools Rugby Senior Cup.

== Leinster ==
Conway joined the Leinster Academy at the beginning of the 2009–10 season. Conway signed his first professional contract in 2010 for Leinster after impressing with the academy. He made his senior debut for Leinster in a Magners League fixture against Scarlets on 20 February 2010, coming on as a late substitution and setting up Johnny Sexton's try. He made his starting debut for Leinster on 7 March 2010, with a victory over the Cardiff Blues. Conway made his Heineken Cup debut in Leinster's 2012–13 Heineken Cup pool fixture against Exeter Chiefs on 13 October 2012. Conway scored a hat-trick for Leinster on 3 May 2013, in their Pro12 game against Ospreys. He started for Leinster against Stade Français in the 2012–13 European Challenge Cup Final on 17 May 2013, which Leinster won 34–13. Conway also started for Leinster in the 2012–13 Pro12 Final victory against Ulster on 25 May 2013, which Leinster won 24–18.

== Munster ==
It was announced on 25 January 2013 that Conway would be joining Munster on a two-year contract at the beginning of the 2013–14 season. He made his Munster debut on 13 September 2013, starting against Zebre. Conway scored his first try for Munster against Cardiff Blues on 23 November 2013. He started in Munster's first European Rugby Champions Cup game against Sale Sharks on 18 October 2014. Conway signed a one-year contract extension with Munster in January 2015. He scored two tries in Munster's 65–10 win against Sale Sharks on 25 January 2015. Conway started at fullback in Munster's opening 2015–16 European Rugby Champions Cup pool game against Benetton on 14 November 2015. In January 2016, Conway signed a two-year contract extension with Munster. On 1 April 2017, Conway scored a try in Munster's 41–16 2016–17 European Rugby Champions Cup quarter-final win against Toulouse.

On 9 September 2017, Conway made his 100th appearance in the Pro14 when he started against South African side Cheetahs in round 2 of the 2017–18 Pro14. Conway was sent-off in Munster's 20–16 defeat against Connacht on 27 October 2017 and subsequently banned for one week. He signed a new two-year contract with Munster in February 2018. Conway scored a 74th minute try, converted by Ian Keatley, to earn Munster a 20–19 win against Toulon in the quarter-finals of the 2017–18 European Rugby Champions Cup. The try was nominated for the Volkswagen-sponsored Try of the Year when the Rugby Players Ireland Awards nominees were announced in April 2018. Conway earned his 100th cap for Munster on 6 October 2018, doing so when he started against old club Leinster in round 6 of the 2018–19 Pro14. He scored two tries in Munster's 44–14 win against Edinburgh on 30 November 2018.

Conway signed a three-year contract with Munster in February 2020. His try against Ospreys in round one of the 2019–20 Champions Cup won the Try of the Year award at the 2020 Irish Rugby Players awards in October 2020. Conway signed a two-year contract extension with the province in December 2022, a deal that would have seen him remain with Munster until at least June 2025; however, on November 9, 2023, Munster announced that Conway would retire from professional rugby with immediate effect due to a knee injury.

== Ireland ==
In 2010, Conway was a part of Ireland's under-20s Six Nations Championship winning team. Conway scored a hat-trick of tries against Scotland at the 2010 IRB Junior World Championship.

Conway was named in the Emerging Ireland squad to take part in the 2013 IRB Tbilisi Cup on 19 May 2013. However, a calf injury ruled Conway out of the tournament. Conway was again selected in the Emerging Ireland squad when it was announced on 26 May 2014. He started against Russia in their first 2014 IRB Nations Cup match on 13 June 2014, scoring a hat-trick. Conway came off the bench in their second game against Uruguay on 18 June 2014. He started in the 31–10 win Romania on 22 June 2014, a win that secured the 2014 IRB Nations Cup for Emerging Ireland.

Conway came off the bench for Ireland Wolfhounds in their game against England Saxons on 30 January 2015. He was named in the Emerging Ireland squad for the 2015 World Rugby Tbilisi Cup on 19 May 2015. Conway scored a try in Emerging Ireland's opening 25–0 win against Emerging Italy on 13 June 2015. Conway started against Uruguay on 17 June 2015, scoring a try in Emerging Ireland's 33–7 win. He also started and scored a try in the 45–12 win against Georgia on 21 June 2015, a win which secured the tournament for Emerging Ireland.

On 23 January 2017, Conway was named in the Ireland squad for the opening two rounds of the 2017 Six Nations Championship. On 18 March, Conway made his debut for the senior Ireland team, coming on as a half-time replacement for Munster teammate Keith Earls in the sides 13–9 victory against England in the Aviva Stadium. Conway was also selected in the squad for the 2017 Summer Tour against the United States and Japan. He started both tests against Japan. Having been selected in the squad for the 2017 Autumn Internationals, Conway scored his first try for Ireland in their 38–3 win against South Africa on 11 November 2017. A week later, he was Man-of-the-Match in Ireland's 23–20 win against Fiji, whilst he also featured off the bench in the win against Argentina.

Conway started in the second test during Ireland's historic 2–1 series victory against Australia in June 2018, scoring a try in the 26–21 victory, before missing the third test through injury. Conway scored a hat-trick and earned the Man-of-the-Match award in Ireland's 57–14 win against the United States during the 2018 Autumn Tests on 24 November 2018.

Conway made two appearances for Ireland during the 2019 Six Nations Championship, in the 26–16 win against Italy, and the 26–14 win against France. He was selected in the 31-man Ireland squad for the 2019 Rugby World Cup, having featured in the warm-up matches against Italy, England and Wales. During the World Cup itself, Conway started in Ireland's opening 27–3 win against Scotland and in the 35–0 win against Russia, before featuring off the bench in Ireland's 47–5 win against Samoa in their final pool game.

Retained by new head coach Andy Farrell in his squad for the 2020 Six Nations Championship, Conway in Ireland's 19–12 opening win against Scotland on 1 February 2020, their 24–14 win against defending champions Wales on 8 February, and their 24–12 defeat against England, before the tournament was suspended due to the COVID-19 pandemic. The tournament eventually resumed in October 2020, with Conway starting in Ireland's 50–17 win against Italy and the 35–27 defeat against France in their final fixture of the tournament.

Conway was nominated for the Players' Player of the Year award at the 2020 Irish Rugby Players awards in October 2020. With the usual format of end-of-year international tests not possible due to the COVID-19 pandemic, Ireland instead participated in the Autumn Nations Cup. Conway started in the 32–9 opening win against Wales on 13 November. During the 2021 July rugby union tests, Conway started in Ireland's 39–31 win against Japan. In the 2021 Autumn Nations Series, Conway started in Ireland's 60–5 win against Japan on 6 November, in which he scored a hat-trick of tries, and in the famous 29–20 win against New Zealand on 13 November.

Conway picked up where he left off for Ireland in their opening fixture of the 2022 Six Nations Championship at home to Wales on 5 February, scoring two tries in their 29–7 win, before also starting in their 30–24 defeat away to France on 12 February, and their 32–15 away win against England on 12 March. A knee injury ruled Conway out of Ireland's final game of the tournament against Scotland; Ireland went on to win the game 26–5, winning the Triple Crown by doing so. That knee injury later required surgery, which ruled Conway out of the 2022 Ireland rugby union tour of New Zealand.

== Personal life ==
Conway and his partner Lizzie welcomed their first child, a daughter, in April 2022, before the couple married in August of that year.

== Statistics ==
=== International analysis by opposition ===
Against	Played	Won	Lost	Drawn	Tries	Points	% Won
Argentina	2	2	0	0	0	0	100
Australia	1	1	0	0	1	5	100
England	4	2	2	0	0	0	50
Fiji	1	1	0	0	0	0	100
France	3	1	2	0	0	0	33.33
Italy	4	4	0	0	1	5	100
Japan	3	3	0	0	3	15	100
New Zealand	1	1	0	0	0	0	100
Russia	1	1	0	0	1	5	100
Samoa	1	1	0	0	1	5	100
Scotland	2	2	0	0	1	5	100
South Africa	1	1	0	0	1	5	100
United States	2	2	0	0	3	15	100
Wales	4	4	0	0	3	15	100
Total	30	26	4	0	15	75	86.67

=== International tries ===
Try	Opposing team	Location	Venue	Competition	Date	Result	Score
1	South Africa	Dublin	Aviva Stadium	2017 November Tests	11 November 2017	Won	38 – 3
2	Australia	Melbourne	AAMI Park	2018 Ireland tour	16 June 2018	Won	21 – 26
3	United States	Dublin	Aviva Stadium	2018 November Tests	24 November 2018	Won	57 – 14
4	United States	Dublin	Aviva Stadium	2018 November Tests	24 November 2018	Won	57 – 14
5	United States	Dublin	Aviva Stadium	2018 November Tests	24 November 2018	Won	57 – 14
6	Italy	Dublin	Aviva Stadium	2019 Rugby World Cup warm-up	10 August 2019	Won	29 – 10
7	Scotland	Yokohama	International Stadium Yokohama	2019 Rugby World Cup	22 September 2019	Won	27 – 3
8	Russia	Kobe	Kobe Misaki Stadium	2019 Rugby World Cup	3 October 2019	Won	35 – 0
9	Samoa	Fukuoka	Fukuoka Hakatanomori Stadium	2019 Rugby World Cup	12 October 2019	Won	47 – 5
10	Wales	Dublin	Aviva Stadium	2020 Six Nations	8 February 2020	Won	24 – 14
11	Japan	Dublin	Aviva Stadium	2021 November Tests	6 November 2021	Won	60 – 5
12	Japan	Dublin	Aviva Stadium	2021 November Tests	6 November 2021	Won	60 – 5
13	Japan	Dublin	Aviva Stadium	2021 November Tests	6 November 2021	Won	60 – 5
14	Wales	Dublin	Aviva Stadium	2022 Six Nations	5 February 2022	Won	29 – 7
15	Wales	Dublin	Aviva Stadium	2022 Six Nations	5 February 2022	Won	29 – 7

Correct as of 12 March 2022

== Honours ==
=== Leinster ===
- European Rugby Challenge Cup:
  - Winner (1): 2012–13
- United Rugby Championship:
  - Winner (1): 2012–13

=== Emerging Ireland ===
- World Rugby Nations Cup
  - Winner (1): (2014)
- World Rugby Tbilisi Cup
  - Winner (1): (2015)

=== Ireland ===
- Triple Crown:
  - Winner (1): 2022
