= Ian Keatley =

Irish rugby union player (born 1987)

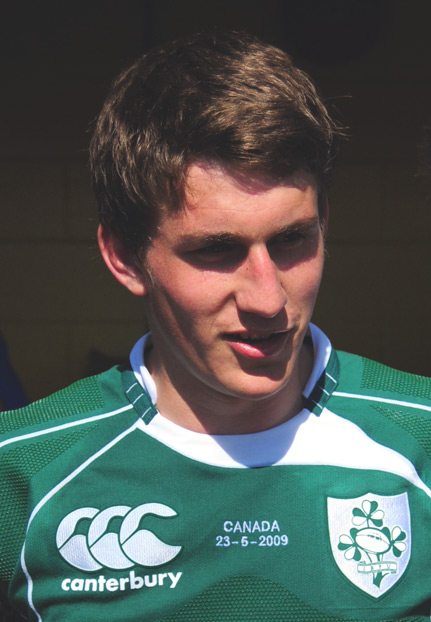
- Keatley after Ireland's win over Canada in Vancouver
- Born: Ian James T. Keatley; 1 April 1987 (age 39) Dublin, Ireland
- Height: 1.80 m (5 ft 11 in)
- Weight: 91 kg (14.3 st; 201 lb)
- School: Belvedere College
- University: University College Dublin

Rugby union career
- Position(s): Fly-half, Centre, Fullback
Amateur team(s)
| Years | Team | Apps | (Points) |
- Suttonians
- UCD
- Clontarf
| 2008–2011 | Corinthians | | |
| 2011–2019 | Young Munster | | |
Senior career
| Years | Team | Apps | (Points) |
| 2007–2008 | Leinster | 0 | (0) |
| 2008–2011 | Connacht | 77 | (688) |
| 2011–2019 | Munster | 180 | (1,247) |
| 2019 | London Irish | 7 | (67) |
| 2019–2021 | Benetton | 20 | (110) |
| 2021 | Glasgow Warriors | 4 | (17) |
- Correct as of 11 June 2021
International career
| Years | Team | Apps | (Points) |
| 2007 | Ireland U20 | 5 | (54) |
| 2007–2014 | Ireland Wolfhounds | 10 | (20) |
| 2009–2017 | Ireland | 7 | (37) |
| 2013–2014 | Emerging Ireland | 6 | (67) |
| 2008 | Ireland Sevens | | |
- Correct as of 25 November 2017

Ian James T. Keatley (born 1 April 1987) is an Irish rugby union player. He plays primarily as a fly-half, but can also play as a centre or fullback.

== Early life ==
Keatley was born in Dublin, where he was educated at Belvedere College and University College Dublin. He was a member of the Belvedere College team which won the Leinster Senior Schools Cup in 2005, the first time the school had achieved this in 33 years. He also represented Suttonians whilst in Dublin.

== Professional career ==
=== Connacht ===
After spending one season as part of Leinster's senior team, during which time he failed to make any appearances for the first team, Keatley joined rival Irish province Connacht ahead of the 2008–09 season. Keatley made his first appearance for the side on 5 September 2008, starting in a 2008–09 Celtic League match against the Ospreys. Keatley played in 17 of Connacht's 18 league games for the season, starting in all of the matches he played. Keatley also made his European debut that season on 10 October 2008, starting in the team's 2008–09 European Challenge Cup game with French side Dax. Of Connacht's six games in the group stages of the competition, Keatley started five, missing a match against London Irish. Keatley also started in Connacht's quarter-final defeat to eventual champions Northampton Saints. He scored a total of 185 points for the province during the course of his first season.

In the following season, Keatley continued to be a regular player for Connacht. He played in all 18 of Connacht's 2009–10 Celtic League games, 13 of these appearances coming as starts. In the 2009–10 Challenge Cup, Keatley played in all of Connacht's group games, starting in four and coming on as a replacement in the other two. Connacht won all of their group games to enter the knockout as top seeds. Keatley started in the province's quarter-final win over Bourgoin, kicking two conversions and a penalty. In the semi-final, Connacht faced a Toulon side featuring Jonny Wilkinson. Keatley kicked all of Connacht's points in the game, as the province were beaten 19–12. Keatley scored a total of 208 points for Connacht over the 2009–10 season.

In the 2010–11 season, Keatley's former coach from the Ireland Under-20 team, Eric Elwood, took over as Connacht coach. With the expansion of the competition to include 12 teams, Keatley featured in all 22 of Connacht's 2010–11 Celtic League games, with just two of his appearances coming as a replacement. In the 2010–11 Challenge Cup, Keatley started all six of the team's games as they failed to qualify for the knock-out stages, finishing second in their group to eventual champions Harlequins. He scored a total of 295 points for the province throughout both competitions.

After his three seasons with Connacht Rugby, Keatley was the province's record points scorer, with a total of 688 points. He left Connacht at the end of the 2010–11 season, joining another Irish province, this time going to Munster.

=== Munster ===
Keatley joined Munster to replace Paul Warwick, signing a two-year contract. He made his Munster debut against Dragons in September 2011. He kicked six from six against Cardiff Blues on 23 September 2011 to win the match 18–13 for Munster, earning the Man-of-the-Match award. Keatley made his Heineken Cup debut in Munster's Round 5 26–10 win over Castres. He scored his first points in the Heinken Cup, a conversion, in Munster's Round 6 51–36 win against Northampton Saints on 21 January 2012. He scored 20 points for Munster in their 35–29 win against Glasgow Warriors on 15 April 2012. Keatley was also crucial in Munster's 20–20 draw with Scarlets on 23 April 2012, kicking 10 points and putting in a superb defensive effort to secure a place in the league play-offs for Munster. He missed Munster's final regular fixture of the 2011–12 season against Ulster after picking up a knock in training.

Keatley signed a two-year contract extension with Munster in January 2013. He won the Man-of-the-Match award in Munster's opening 2013–14 Pro12 victory against Edinburgh on 7 September 2013. He kicked 14 points in Munster's 19–15 win against Leinster on 5 October 2013, a game in which he also won the Man-of-the-Match award. Keatley won another Man-of-the-Match award in Munster's 18–14 away win against Dragons on 29 November 2013, a game in which he kicked all of Munster's points. Keatley was nominated for the 2014 Munster Rugby Senior Player of the Year award on 1 May 2014.

Keatley scored 21 points in Munster's 34–23 away win against Leinster on 4 October 2014. He scored the winning drop-goal in Munster's first game in the European Rugby Champions Cup against Sale Sharks on 18 October 2014. He was the Man-of-the-Match in Munster's 38–12 away win against Dragons on 21 November 2014, scoring 13 points. It was announced on 7 January 2015 that Keatley had signed a two-year contract extension with Munster. Keatley scored 15 points, including a try, and won the Man-of-the-Match award in Munster's 35–27 win against Cardiff Blues on 17 October 2015. On 2 January 2016, Keatley scored all of Munster's points in their 9–7 win against Ulster, earning the Man-of-the-Match award.

On 1 October 2016, Keatley kicked 6 points in Munster's 49–5 win against Zebre in a 2016–17 Pro12 fixture. In doing so, he crossed the 1,000-point mark for the province. On 2 December 2016, Keatley scored the winning drop-goal in Munster's 15–16 away win against Glasgow Warriors. On 6 May 2017, Keatley made his 150th appearance for Munster during their 50–14 victory against Connacht, in which he scored 15 points off the kicking tee and won the Man-of-the-Match award. On 19 May 2017, it was announced that Keatley had signed a two-year contract extension with Munster. Keatley was Man-of-the-Match in Munster's 2017–18 Pro14 Round 5 victory against Cardiff Blues on 30 September 2017. He scored 20 points off the kicking tee in Munster's 25–16 away win against Leicester Tigers in the 2017–18 Champions Cup on 17 December 2017. In Munster's Champions Cup quarter-final against Toulon on 31 March 2017, Keatley converted Andrew Conway's 74th minute try to earn Munster a 20–19 win.

At the time of his departure from Munster for London Irish in January 2019, Keatley was Munster's second all-time highest points scorer with 1,247 in his 180 appearances for the province. He was also third on the all-time list for points scored in the United Rugby Championship with 1,428, and fifth on the list for appearances with 196.

=== London Irish ===
Keatley joined English RFU Championship side London Irish, where former Munster and Ireland head coach Declan Kidney is director of rugby, in January 2019 for the remainder of the 2018–19 season. He debuted for the club on 16 February 2019, starting at fly-half and scoring Irish's opening try and converting it, before going off injured in the 27th minute of their 52–22 win against Coventry. Keatley started in Irish's 46–7 away win against Richmond on 19 April 2019, a victory that secured the 2018–19 RFU Championship for the Exiles and a return to the Gallagher Premiership.

=== Benetton and Glasgow Warriors ===
Keatley joined Italian United Rugby Championship side Benetton ahead of the 2019–20 season. He was granted an early release from his contract with Benetton in January 2021.

Keatley joined Scottish club Glasgow Warriors in January 2021 on a contract for the remainder of the 2020–21 season, providing fly-half cover for the injured Adam Hastings and Peter Horne. Keatley said of the move: "This club is a top-quality outfit and I'm relishing the chance to be able to play alongside some of its top-quality talent.".

Keatley replaced Ross Thompson in the Warriors' match against Zebre on 6 March 2021, becoming Glasgow Warrior No. 325 and scoring 3 conversions in Glasgow's 31–20 bonus point win over the Italian side. Keatley was released by Glasgow at the end of the 2020–21 season.

== Ireland ==
Keatley made his senior debut for Ireland during their 2009 Summer Tour to North America. He won his first cap against Canada on 23 May, scoring 10 points. He won a second cap on 31 May 2009, when Ireland beat United States 27–10, with Keatley scoring 7 points. Keatley was selected in the Ireland Wolfhounds squad for their game against England Saxons in January 2012. He started the game at fly-half.

Keatley was drafted into Ireland's training squad for the 2013 Six Nations Championship on 21 January 2013. Keatley played for Ireland Wolfhounds in their friendly against England Saxons on 25 January 2013. Keatley was named in the Emerging Ireland squad to take part in the 2013 IRB Tbilisi Cup on 19 May 2013. He started against Georgia in Emerging Ireland's first game of the tournament on 7 June 2013, scoring 15 points in his sides 20–15 victory. Keatley also started the 19–8 defeat against South Africa President's XV on 11 June 2013. He scored 22 points against Uruguay in Emerging Ireland's 42–33 victory on 16 June 2013, a win which secured his side a second-place finish at the tournament.

In January 2014, Keatley was included in the provisional 44-man squad for the 2014 Six Nations Championship. He came off the bench for Ireland Wolfhounds in their friendly against England Saxons on 25 January 2014. Keatley was again selected in the Emerging Ireland squad when it was announced on 26 May 2014. He started against Russia in their first 2014 IRB Nations Cup match on 13 June 2014, scoring a try and four conversions. Keatley came off the bench in their second game against Uruguay on 18 June 2014, scoring 3 points. He started in the 31–10 win Romania on 22 June 2014, a win that secured the 2014 IRB Nations Cup for Emerging Ireland.

Keatley was named in the Ireland squad for the 2014 autumn internationals on 21 October 2014. He came off the bench in the 49–7 win against Georgia on 16 November 2014. He was named in the Ireland squad for the opening rounds of the 2015 Six Nations Championship on 1 February 2015. He started in the first game against Italy on 7 February 2015, scoring 14 points in Ireland's 26–3 win. In January 2017, Keatley was added to the Ireland squad for the 2017 Six Nations Championship as injury cover for Johnny Sexton. Having been selected in the squad for the 2017 Autumn Internationals, Keatley came off the bench against Fiji on 18 November 2017 and scored the winning penalty in Ireland's 23–20 victory.

== Honours ==
=== London Irish ===
- RFU Championship
  - Winner (1): 2018–19

=== Emerging Ireland ===
- World Rugby Tbilisi Cup
  - Runner-Up (1): 2013
- World Rugby Nations Cup
  - Winner (1): 2014

=== Ireland ===
- Six Nations Championship:
  - Winner (1): 2015
