= Italian Rugby Federation =

Governing body of rugby union in Italy

Federazione Italiana Rugby
- Sport: Rugby union
- Founded: 1928; 97 years ago
- World Rugby affiliation: 1987
- Rugby Europe affiliation: 1934
- President: Andrea Duodo
- Men's coach: Gonzalo Quesada
- Women's coach: Giovanni Raineri
- Website: federugby.it

The Italian Rugby Federation (Italian: Federazione Italiana Rugby) or FIR is the governing body for the sport of rugby union in Italy. The FIR has one seat on the 28-member World Rugby Council, the governing body of World Rugby. (All other members of the Six Nations have two seats on the council.)

There are two fully professional Italian clubs that play in the United Rugby Championship, in the European Rugby Champions Cup and in the European Rugby Challenge Cup — Benetton and Zebre. There are twelve semi-professional Italian clubs that play in the Top12, four of which qualify to play in the European Rugby Challenge Cup Qualifying Competition to qualify to the European Rugby Challenge Cup.

== History ==
On 25 July 1911 a Propaganda Committee was formed to promote the sport of rugby union in Italy. In 1928 this body became the Federazione Italiana Rugby (FIR). In 1934 the FIR was a founder member of the Fédération Internationale de Rugby Amateur, now known as Rugby Europe.

The FIR joined the International Rugby Football Board, later known as the International Rugby Board and now as World Rugby, in 1987 when Italy took part in the inaugural World Cup. The Italy national rugby union team has played in the Six Nations Championship since 2000.

Italy bid to host the 2015 Rugby World Cup came close to winning but lost to England by just three votes.

== Leadership ==
- Andrea Duodo (2024–present), former player, accountant, businessman
- Marzio Innocenti (2021–2024), physician, former captain of the Italian national team
- Alfredo Gavazzi (2012–2021), businessman, former hooker, president and founder of Rugby Calvisano
- Giancarlo Dondi (1996–2012), businessman, former flanker for Fiamme Oro and Parma, gained Italy's entry into the Six Nations Championship in 2000
- Maurizio Mondelli (1984–1996), engineer and former player for Rugby Roma

== National teams ==
The FIR is responsible for fielding several men's national teams:

- Italy national rugby union team - plays in the Six Nations and in the Rugby World Cup
- Emerging Italy - plays in the World Rugby Nations Cup or in the World Rugby Tbilisi Cup
- Italy national rugby sevens team - plays in the Sevens Grand Prix Series, has participated in the Rugby World Cup Sevens
- Italy national under-20 rugby union team - plays in the Junior World Championship or in the World Rugby Under 20 Trophy and in the Six Nations Under 20s

The FIR is also responsible for fielding several women's national teams:

- Italy national women's rugby union team - plays in the Women's Six Nations and in the Women's Rugby World Cup
- Italy women's national rugby sevens team- has participated in the Rugby World Cup Sevens

== See also ==
- Rugby union in Italy
- Italy national rugby union team
- Top12
- United Rugby Championship
