= Jerry Holland (rugby union) =

Irish rugby union player and coach (1955–2022)

- Born: Jeremiah Joseph Holland; 24 November 1955 Cork, Ireland
- Died: 13 November 2022 (aged 66)
- Notable relative: Billy Holland (son)

Rugby union career
- Position: Lock
Amateur team(s)
Years	Team	Apps	(Points)
- UCC
- Cork Constitution
Senior career
Years	Team	Apps	(Points)
- Munster
- Leinster
International career
Years	Team	Apps	(Points)
1981–1986	Ireland	3	(0)
Coaching career
- Years: Team
- 1994–1997: Munster (Head coach)
- 1997–1998: Munster (Assistant coach)
- 1998–1999: Ireland A (Manager)
- 2000–2008: Munster (Manager)

Jeremiah Joseph Holland (24 November 1955 – 13 November 2022) was an Irish rugby union player and coach.

== Life and career ==
Born in Cork, Holland played for Munster and won three caps for Ireland between 1981 and 1986, before transitioning into coaching, becoming Munster's head coach for three seasons from 1994–95 until 1996–97, overseeing the provinces transition from an amateur to professional side and their first fixtures in the Heineken Cup. In his time as head coach, Munster won the IRFU Interprovincial Championship twice, in 1994–95 and 1996–97, and won all of their home Heineken Cup games. Ahead of the 1997–98 season, all four Irish provinces were to appoint full-time directors of coaching, but Holland chose not to apply for the role. Instead, Holland became part of Munster's coaching staff under new head coach John Bevan, as well as becoming Ireland A's manager for the 1998–99 season, before becoming Munster manager from 2000 until 2007. After rugby, Holland worked for EBS, one of Ireland's largest financial institutions. His son, Billy, is also a rugby player, winning over 200 caps for Munster and one cap for Ireland in 2016. He died on 13 November 2022, at the age of 66.

== Honours (as coach) ==
=== Munster ===
- IRFU Interprovincial Championship
  - Winner (2): 1994–95, 1996–97
