= Gabriel Conache =

Romanian rugby union footballer

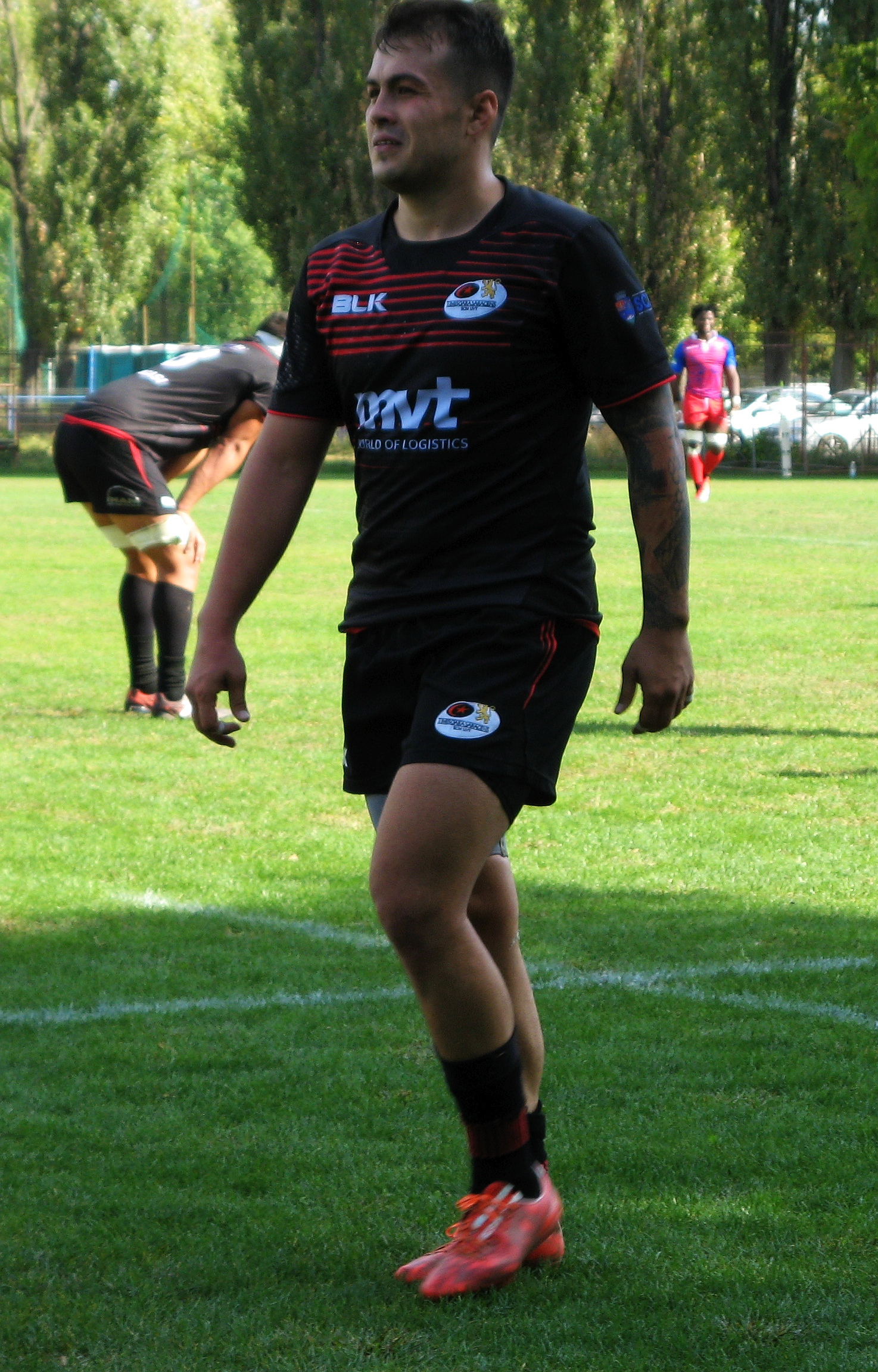
- Gabriel Conache in 2018 during a SuperLiga match
- Born: Gabriel Conache; 24 January 1991 (age 35) Suceava, Romania
- Height: 5 ft 10.9 in (1.80 m)
- Weight: 12 st 8.4 lb (80.0 kg)

Rugby union career
- Position: Fly-half
Senior career
Years	Team	Apps	(Points)
- RC Timişoara

Gabriel Conache (born 24 January 1991, Suceava, Romania) is a Romanian rugby union footballer. He plays the position of fly-half and is currently playing for RC Timişoara in the Romanian Rugby Championship. He is an international player being capped for the Romanian rugby union team U18. Romania won 4th place at the European Rugby Championship U18 with him as a member of the line-up. He was the best player of the match during his first cap against Italy, where he scored most of the points for his team, even managing to open the score via a penalty and even scoring a try which he also converted making the score 10-0 for Romania.
