= Michael Bent =

Ireland international rugby union player

- Full name: Michael Ryan Bent
- Born: 25 April 1986 (age 40) Hāwera, New Zealand
- Height: 186 cm (6 ft 1 in)
- Weight: 118 kg (260 lb; 18 st 8 lb)
- School: Hawera High School

Rugby union career
- Position: Prop
- Current team: Taranaki
Senior career
Years	Team	Apps	(Points)
2009–	Taranaki	48	(0)
2011–2012	Hurricanes	11	(0)
2012–2021	Leinster	164	(40)
- Correct as of 16 July 2021
International career
Years	Team	Apps	(Points)
2012–2022	Ireland	5	(0)
2013–2014	Emerging Ireland	5	(0)
- Correct as of 16 July 2021

Michael Bent (born 25 April 1986 in Hāwera, New Zealand) is a New Zealand born rugby union player who can play as a tight or loosehead prop. He played for Leinster in the Pro14 and represented Ireland at international level.

He has also represented Taranaki in the ITM Cup, and spent two seasons with the Hurricanes in Super Rugby. He made his debut for Ireland against South Africa in the 2012 autumn international series.

== Domestic career ==
At the age of 23 Bent was selected for the Taranaki team as a versatile prop – playing both Tight and Loosehead positions.

Bent made three pre-season appearances and five competition appearances in the 2011 Super 15 season for the Hurricanes. After playing his first games for the Hurricanes, Bent linked up with Taranaki in the 2011 ITM Cup. Playing on both sides of the scrum, Bent was a key cog in Taranaki's third place ITM Cup finish and Ranfurly Shield winning season.

After being used as nothing more than a bit part player for the Hurricanes in 2012, Bent returned to Taranaki and played in every one of the side's 13 first-class matches. While he was used extensively as a loosehead prop in 2011, Bent showed his versatility by making the No 3 jersey his own in a campaign that saw Taranaki defend the Ranfurly Shield six times and win seven of their 10 regular season national provincial championship fixtures. He developed his game this season, improving his defence, mobility and ball carrying. As well as the player of the year, Bent was named the sportsman of the year - the players' player of the year - who best demonstrated excellence on and off the field. Surprisingly, and an anomaly of the awards, Bent was not named forward of the year by the selection panel made up of the Taranaki management team. Instead, that prize went to No 8 Blade Thomson.

== Leinster and Ireland ==
In late October 2012 Bent arrived in Ireland to join Leinster. He was immediately drafted into the Ireland squad for their November Internationals. He qualifies to play for Ireland through his Irish grandmother, and made his debut against South Africa on 10 November 2012 at Lansdowne Road. Following a strong season in the Championship, Bent was named to his first Pro14 Dream Team at the conclusion of the 2020–21 season. In April 2021 Bent announced that he would retire after the Pro14 Rainbow Cup.

== Return to New Zealand ==
As a 35 year-old, Bent played for Taranaki in the 2021 Bunnings NPC and played for the Southern Rugby club.

In July 2022, Bent was called on by the Ireland national rugby union team during the 2022 Ireland rugby union tour of New Zealand as a late injury replacement and played the last five minutes for them in the 30-24 victory over the Māori All Blacks.

== Honours ==
Leinster

- European Rugby Champions Cup (1): 2018
- Pro14 (6): 2013, 2014, 2018, 2019, 2020, 2021
- European Challenge Cup (1): 2013

Individual

- Pro14 Dream Team (1): 2020–21
