= Filip Lazăr (rugby union) =

Romanian rugby union footballer

- Full name: Filip-Emanuel Lazăr
- Born: 17 April 1990 (age 36) Constanța, Romania
- Height: 1.78 m (5 ft 10 in)
- Weight: 85.8 kg (13 st 7 lb; 189 lb)
- University: Faculty of Physical Education and Sports, Ovidius University
- Occupation: Kinesiologist

Rugby union career
- Position: Centre
Youth career
- Cleopatra Mamaia
- LPS "Nicolae Rotaru"
Senior career
Years	Team	Apps	(Points)
2010–12	Farul Constanța		
2012–13	Rugby Club Trignacais		
2013–14	Rugby athletic club angérien		
2014–15	Steaua București		
2015–18	Beauvais Rugby Club		
- Correct as of 9 May 2020
Provincial / State sides
Years	Team	Apps	(Points)
2014	București Wolves	1	(0)
- Correct as of 9 May 2020
International career
Years	Team	Apps	(Points)
2014	Romania	2	(0)
- Correct as of 9 May 2020

Filip-Emanuel Lazăr (born 17 April 1990) is a former Romanian rugby union footballer and currently a kinesiologist. He played as a centre.

== Club career ==
Filip Lazăr started playing rugby with Romanian youth club Cleopatra Mamaia under the guidance of coaches Nicoale Dinu and Adrian Tinca. His next club was LPS "Nicolae Rotaru" where he was coached by Virgil Năstase. After finishing his junior years, Lazăr was signed by SuperLiga side, Farul Constanța. After some time with his native club, Lazăr moved to France and joined Fédérale 2 club, Rugby Club Trignacais. In order to improve his abilities, he signed to Fédérale 1 side, Rugby athletic club angérien. After some impressive performances in France, he was signed by Romanian giants, Steaua București. AFter just one season with the Red and blues he once again moved to France and played for three seasons for what would become his last career club, Beauvais Rugby Club.

=== Provincial / State sides ===
Lazăr was also selected in 2014 for the State side assembled to play in the European Cups, namely București Wolves.

== International career ==
Lazăr was also selected for Romania's national team, the Oaks, making his international debut during the 2014 IRB Nations Cup in a test match against Los Teros.
