= Filip Lazăr (musician) =

Filip Lazăr (6 May 1894 – 3 November 1936) was an avant-garde Romanian composer and pianist.

== Life and career ==
Lazăr was born in Craiova, Romania and died in Paris, France. At the Bucharest Conservatory (1907–1912) he studied piano with Emilia Saegiu, theory with Dumitru Georgescu Kiriac and with Alfonso Castaldi he studied harmony, counterpoint and composition. He studied for two years with Castaldi at the Leipzig Conservatory before touring as a pianist, playing much new music. From 1928 he was in France and Switzerland. He ventured from a Romanian nationalistic style into serialism and neo-classicism.

From 1925, important publishers in Paris (Durand, Salabert, Max Eschig and Heugel) and Vienna (Universal Edition) began printing the works of Lazăr and other Romanian composers such as Mihail Jora, Marcel Mihalovici and George Enescu.

In 1920 Lazăr was a founder-member of the Society of Romanian Composers. In 1932, along with Mihalovici, he was among the founders of the Triton society of contemporary music in Paris (1932–1939), and a member of its active committee.

== Theatre music ==
- 1918 – La bouteille de Panurge, ballet, libretto by André Cœuroy
- 1928 – Les Images de Béatrice, op. 18, opera from The Cenci by Percy Bysshe Shelley, libretto by André Cœuroy

== Symphonic music ==
- 1919 – Prelude, for orchestra
- 1921 – Romanian Suite in D, for orchestra
- 1924 – Divertissement on a simple theme, for orchestra
- 1925 – Suite Valaque, for small orchestra
- 1925 – "Gypsies", scherzo for full orchestra, played in Paris 1927, conducted by Serge Koussevitzky
- 1927 – Concerto Grosso, for orchestra, no. 1, op 17
- 1928 – Le Ring. Un round de 4 minutes, for orchestra no. 2 - a symphonic miniature inspired by a boxing match, played in Paris in 1930, conducted by George Georgescu
- 1931 – Musique pour Radio
- 1931 – Overture for small orchestra
- 1931 – Concerto No. 2, for piano and orchestra, op. 19
- 1934 – Concerto No. 3, for piano and orchestra, op. 23
- 1934 – Concerto No. 4, for percussion and 12 instruments, op. 24 – in 1935 premiered at the Triton concerts in Paris, conducted by Charles Munch, the next year played in Boston; Chamber concerto
- 1931 – Concerto Grosso No. 2, unfinished

== Chamber music ==
- 1915 – Sonata in F for piano
- 1919 – Sonata in E minor for violin and piano
- 1924 – Suite I for piano
- 1925 – Suite II for piano Both suites played in Bucharest by Mme. Manya Botez.
- 1925 – Two Romanian folk dances for piano
- 1925 – Bagatelle for cello (or double bass) and piano (or orchestra)
- 1926 – Sonata III for piano
- 1927 – Bagatelle for piano
- 1929 – Sonata in A minor for piano, op. 15
- 1929 – Little pieces for children, op. 16
- 1934 – Trio for oboe, clarinet and bassoon
- 1935 – Trio for violin, viola and cello
- 1936 – Little suite for oboe, clarinet and bassoon; Trio for harps; Quintet for harps

== Choral music ==
- 1924 – "Dor de crâng", folk songs for mixed voices
- 1924 – "Paparudele", 6-part folk songs for mixed voices

== Vocal music ==
- 1926 – Two folk songs, for voice and piano ([Romanian] "Cuprinde: Mi-a trimis bădița dor"; "Dorule pribeag; Vai, mândruțo!")
- 1927 – Three pastorals, for voice and piano, lyrics by St. Octavian Iosif ([Romanian] "Cuprinde: Singurel ca un haiduc"; "Boii stau la jug supuși"; "Dragă codrule, te las!" )
- Melody on a poem by Heinrich Heine for voice and piano
- Six melodies for voice and piano (or orchestra)

== Biography ==
- V. Tomescu, Filip Lazăr, Editura Muzicală, București, 1963 [Romanian]
