= World Rugby Tbilisi Cup =

Rugby union competition

- Sport: Rugby union
- Founded: 2013
- No. of teams: 4
- Country: 2015 Teams; Emerging Ireland; Emerging Italy; Georgia; Uruguay
- Most recent champion: Emerging Ireland (2015)

The World Rugby Tbilisi Cup is a rugby union competition that was first held in 2013 at Avchala Stadium in Tbilisi with the hosts Georgia joined by Uruguay, who regularly take part in the Nations Cup, and two newly founded teams: Emerging Ireland, who were made up of young Irish players that didn't get selected for the Lions tour to Australia or the national side's tour to North America, and a South Africa President's XV, composed of Currie Cup players.

Georgia was the only team to return for the second edition in 2014. They were joined by Spain and two teams that regularly take part in the IRB Nations Cup, Argentina Jaguars and Emerging Italy. In 2015, Emerging Ireland, Emerging Italy and Uruguay returned to the tournament, with Emerging Ireland claiming the title for the first ever time.

In 2026 it was recreated as annual competition between club from European emerging nations and South African teams excluded from United Rugby Championship. It could be consider an extention of Toyota Challenge.

== History ==
=== Teams ===
The teams that participated in the Tbilisi Cup and their finishing positions are as follows:

Team	2013	2014	2015	2026
Argentina XV	—N/a	1st	—N/a	—N/a
Emerging Ireland	2nd	—N/a	1st	—N/a
Georgia	3rd	2nd	3rd	—N/a
Emerging Italy	—N/a	3rd	2nd	—N/a
South Africa President's XV	1st	—N/a	—N/a	—N/a
Spain	—N/a	4th	—N/a	—N/a
Uruguay	4th	—N/a	4th	—N/a
Cheetahs	—N/a	—N/a	—N/a	4th
Griquas	—N/a	—N/a	—N/a	1st
Pumas	—N/a	—N/a	—N/a	2nd
(Georgia (country)) Black Lion	—N/a	—N/a	—N/a	3rd
Lusitanos	—N/a	—N/a	—N/a	6th
Castilla y León Iberians	—N/a	—N/a	—N/a	5th

== Statistics ==
Updated 21 June 2015 after 2015 World Rugby Tbilisi Cup.

=== Leading point scorers ===
Pos	Name	Team	Points
1	Beka Tsiklauri	Georgia	54
2	Ian Keatley	Emerging Ireland	40
3	Juan Pablo Socino	Argentina XV	36
4	Carlo Canna	Emerging Italy	34
5	Lasha Malaghuradze	Georgia	28
6	Carl Bezuidenhout	South Africa President's XV	25
7	JJ Hanrahan	Emerging Ireland	20
8	Andrew Conway	Emerging Ireland	15
9	Agustín Ormaechea	Uruguay	12
10	Jerónimo Etcheverry	Uruguay	11

=== Leading try scorers ===
Pos	Name	Team	Tries
1	Andrew Conway	Emerging Ireland	3
2	Uzair Cassiem	South Africa President's XV	2
2	Matt Healy	Emerging Ireland	2
2	Ian Keatley	Emerging Ireland	2
2	Niall Morris	Emerging Ireland	2
2	Ramiro Moyano	Argentina XV	2
2	Tamaz Mtchedlidze	Georgia	2
2	Sebastian Poet	Argentina XV	2
2	Alexander Todua	Georgia	2
2	Michele Visentin	Emerging Italy	2
2	Zurab Zhvania	Georgia	2

== 2026 ==
- 2026 teams:
- Cheetahs
- Griquas
- Pumas
- (Georgia (country)) Black Lion
- Lusitanos
- Castilla y León Iberians

=== Matchday 1 ===
24 September 2026

Black Lion	15–21	Griquas (South Africa)

Avchala Stadium, Tbilisi

24 September 2026

Lusitanos	26–38	Cheetahs (South Africa)

Avchala Stadium, Tbilisi

24 September 2026

Castilla y León Iberians	21–64	Pumas (South Africa)

Avchala Stadium, Tbilisi

=== Matchday 2 ===
29 September 2026

Black Lion	21-19	Pumas (South Africa)

Avchala Stadium, Tbilisi

29 September 2026

Castilla y León Iberians	22-19	Cheetahs (South Africa)

Avchala Stadium, Tbilisi

29 September 2026

Lusitanos	19-59	Griquas (South Africa)

Avchala Stadium, Tbilisi

=== Matchday 3 ===
4 October 2026

Black Lion	36-25	Cheetahs (South Africa)

Avchala Stadium, Tbilisi

4 October 2026

Castilla y León Iberians	15-48	Griquas (South Africa)

Avchala Stadium, Tbilisi

4 October 2026

Lusitanos	20-68	Pumas (South Africa)

Avchala Stadium, Tbilisi

== See also ==
- World Rugby Nations Cup
- World Rugby Pacific Nations Cup
- Americas Rugby Championship
- Toyota Challenge
