= Emerging Ireland =

Irish rugby team

- Union: Irish Rugby Football Union
- Emblem: Shamrock
- Founded: 2013
- Location: Ireland
- Director of Rugby: David Humphreys
- Coach: Simon Easterby
- Captain: Alex Kendellen
- Most caps: Ian Keatley (6 caps); Andrew Conway
- Top scorer: Ian Keatley (67 points)
- Most tries: Andrew Conway (6 tries)
Team kit	Change kit

First international
- Georgia 15–20 E. Ireland (7 June 2013)

Largest win
- E. Ireland 66–0 Russia (13 June 2014)

Largest defeat
- E. Ireland 8–19 South Africa XV (11 June 2013)

Emerging Ireland is an Irish international rugby union team that represents Ireland in selected matches, tours and competitions. Composed of Ireland qualified players only, mostly uncapped or at the beginning of their careers, it forms part of the development pathway to the senior Ireland team. It is not to be confused with the Ireland Wolfhounds, the national 'A' team which occasionally competes and is a level below the national side but with no age restrictions, nor with the Elite U-20 team with strict age limits that competes in the Under-20 Six Nations and Rugby World Cup.

Emerging Ireland operates primarily as a touring side, allowing for a extended period of training and competition together for players and coaches. As of 2024, Emerging Ireland had undertaken five tours for a total of 15 matches. Their record over those matches was 14 games won, and a single defeat against a South African Presidents XV in 2013.

== History ==
=== 2013 Tbilisi Cup ===
The team was created to offer Tier 1 level opposition for Tier 2 sides in the IRB Tbilisi Cup, held in Tbilisi, Georgia. Allen Clarke, Ian Costello and Joey Miles managed the team, with Rhys Ruddock as captain.

In Emerging Ireland's opening match, they faced hosts Georgia. This match was won by the Emerging side 20–15 in their first ever game. In their second match, South Africa President's XV beat Emerging Ireland 19–8, before Emerging Ireland beat Uruguay 42–33 on 16 June 2013 to secure a second-place finish in the tournament.

The squad for the tournament was named on 19 May 2013. The initial squad featured four internationally capped players; Michael Bent, Seán Cronin, Ian Keatley and Rhys Ruddock the captain. However, Cronin was called up to the senior squad on 26 May 2013, thus lowering the international players from four to three. The remaining twenty three players, had, at the time, not played for Ireland internationally or at test level.

=== 2014 IRB Nations Cup ===
On 1 April 2014, it was announced that Emerging Ireland would take part in the 2014 edition of the IRB Nations Cup in Bucharest, Romania. Dan McFarland, Connacht assistant coach at the time, was appointed as head coach and Ulster backs coach, Neil Doak was chosen to assist him.

In the first game of the cup Emerging Ireland beat Russia by a score of 66–0 at 45 minutes into the game, when it was stopped by the referee, Ian Davies, because of a storm and fears for the players safety. The match included 10 tries,3 of those from Andrew Conway. This was Emerging Ireland's largest ever win in international rugby. Dan McFarland's side beat Uruguay 51–3 in their second game to set up the last game against Romania as a title decider. This game turned out to be the closest of all their games but Emerging Ireland still ran out at 31–10 winners to secure the IRB nations cup with 3 bonus point victories.

=== 2015 Tbilisi Cup ===
Emerging Ireland won the 2015 Tbilisi Cup tournament with three from three victories, taking the Tbilisi Cup for their first ever time.

=== 2022 South Africa Tour ===
After a significant hiatus, Emerging Ireland re-emerged, but with a different purpose, providing development opportunities for young senior players in international conditions, Simon Easterby was appointed head coach of the Emerging Ireland squad for their three fixtures against South African Currie Cup sides in Autumn 2022. Ireland won their first match of the tour beating the Griquas 54–7 at Toyota Stadium. They won their second match of the tour with a 28–24 victory over the Pumas. Emerging Ireland completed a sweep of their tour of South Africa on 9 October with a 21–14 win over the Cheetahs.

=== 2024 South Africa Tour ===
Emerging Ireland returned to South Africa in October 2024 for a three match tour against the Pumas, Western Force and the Cheetahs. They started their tour with a 36-24 victory over the Pumas in Bloemfontein. Ireland beat the Western Force 29–24 in its second match of the tour. Emerging Ireland secured their second Toyota Challenge crown with a 24–33 victory over the Cheetahs going three for three on their South Africa tour.

== Statistics ==
=== Overall ===
Against	Played	Won	Drawn	Lost	For	Against	Diff	% Won
(South Africa) Cheetahs	2	2	0	0	54	38	+16	100.00%
Georgia	2	2	0	0	65	27	+38	100.00%
(South Africa) Griquas	1	1	0	0	54	7	+47	100.00%
Emerging Italy	1	1	0	0	25	0	+25	100.00%
(South Africa) Pumas	2	2	0	0	64	48	+16	100.00%
Russia	1	1	0	0	66	0	+66	100.00%
(South Africa) SA Pres. XV	1	0	0	1	8	19	–11	0.00%
Uruguay	3	3	0	0	126	43	+83	100.00%
Romania	1	1	0	0	31	10	+21	100.00%
(Australia) Western Force	1	1	0	0	29	24	+5	100.00%
Total	15	14	0	1	522	216	+306	93.33%

Up to date as of 9 October 2024

Tournament	Coach(es)	Captain	Games					
Tournament	Coach(es)	Captain	Played	Won	Drawn	Lost	PF	PA
2013 IRB Tbilisi Cup	Allen Clarke	Rhys Ruddock	3	2	0	1	70	67
2014 IRB Nations Cup	Dan McFarland	Dominic Ryan	3	3	0	0	148	13
2015 World Rugby Tbilisi Cup	Allen Clarke	Rhys Ruddock	3	3	0	0	103	19
2022 Toyota Challenge	Simon Easterby	Max Deegan	3	3	0	0	103	45
2024 Toyota Challenge	Simon Easterby	Alex Kendellen	3	3	0	0	98	72

== Honours ==
- Toyota Challenge
  - Winners: 2 (2022, 2024)
- World Rugby Nations Cup
  - Winners: 1 (2014)
- World Rugby Tbilisi Cup
  - Winners: 1 (2015)
  - Runners-Up: 1 (2013)

== Current squad ==
Emerging Ireland 33-man squad for the Toyota Challenge was announced on 18 September 2024. Head Coach: Simon Easterby

Player	Club	Province
Forwards
Jack Aungier	Clontarf	Connacht
Jack Boyle	UCD	Leinster
James Culhane	UCD	Leinster
Jordan Duggan	Naas	Connacht
Sean Edogbo	UCC	Munster
Ronan Foxe	Garryowen	Munster
Cormac Izuchukwu	Ballynahinch	Ulster
Sean Jansen		Connacht
Alex Kendellen (c)	UCC	Munster
Gus McCarthy	ICD	Leinster
Darragh Murray	Buccaneers	Connacht
Evan O’Connell	UL Bohemians	Munster
Conor O’Tighearnaigh	ICD	Leinster
Danny Sheahan	Cork Constitution	Munster
Harry Sheridan	Dublin University	Ulster
Stephen Smyth	Old Wesley	Leinster
Alex Soroka	Clontarf	Leinster
Backs
Scott Wilson	Queen’s University	Ulster
Shayne Bolton		Connacht
Hugh Cooney	Clontarf	Leinster
Ethan Coughlan	Shannon	Munster
Matthew Devine	Corinthians	Connacht
Cormac Foley	Lansdowne	Leinster
Hugh Gavin	Galwegians	Connacht
Jack Murphy	Clontarf	Ulster
Tommy O’Brien	UCD	Leinster
Sean O’Brien	Clontarf	Munster
Ben O’Connor	UCC	Munster
Andrew Osborne	Naas	Leinster
Jude Postlethwaite	City of Armagh	Ulster
Sam Prendergast	Lansdowne	Leinster
Rob Russell	Dublin University	Leinster
Zac Ward	Ballynahinch	Ulster

=== Head coaches and statistics ===
Correct as of 9 October 2024

Coach	Season(s)	GP	W	D	L	Win %	Loss %	Championships / notes
(Ireland) Allen Clarke	2013	3	2	0	1	66.67%	33.33%	
(England) Dan McFarland	2014	3	3	0	0	100%	0%	2014 IRB Nations Cup
(Ireland) Allen Clarke	2015	3	3	0	0	100%	0%	2015 World Rugby Tbilisi Cup
(Ireland) Simon Easterby	2022–2024	6	6	0	0	100%	0%	2022 Toyota Challenge, 2024 Toyota Challenge
Total	2013–present	15	14	0	1	93.33%	6.67%	

== See also ==
- Ireland national rugby union team
- Ireland Wolfhounds
- Ireland national under-20 rugby union team
- IRB Tbilisi Cup
- IRB Nations Cup
