= World Rugby Nations Cup =

International rugby union competition

- Upcoming season or competition: 2026 World Rugby Nations Cup
- Sport: Rugby union
- First season: 2026; 0 years ago
- No. of teams: 12
- Most recent champions: United States (Americas-Pacific pool); Georgia (European-African-Asian pool)

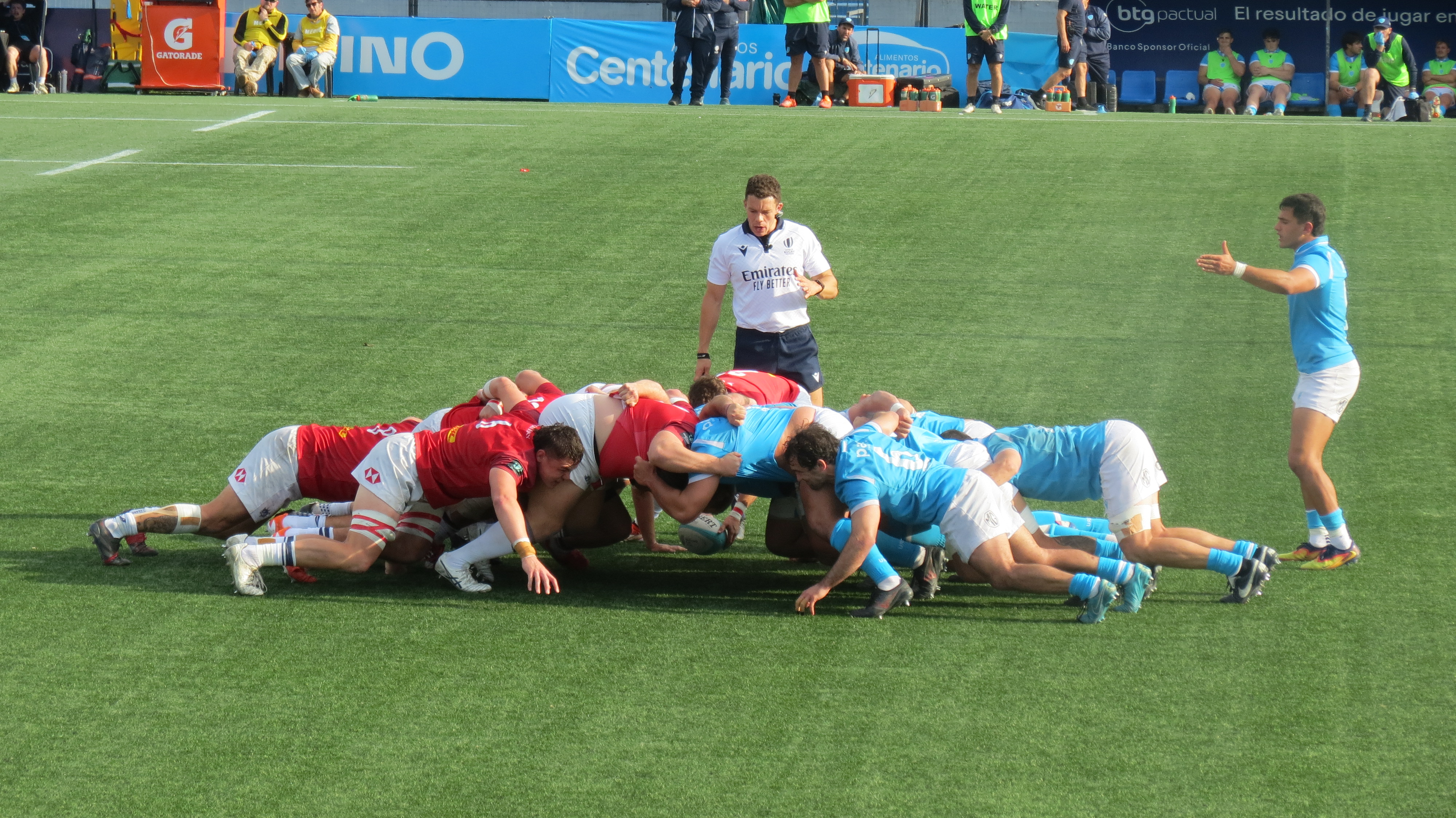
Uruguay vs Hong Kong

The World Rugby Nations Cup is a second tier rugby union competition for international men's teams, run by World Rugby, that is taking place concurrently with the Nations Championship. It consists of twelve teams, with promotion and relegation between the Nations Cup and the Nations Championship commencing from 2030.

In December 2024 when the Nations Championship was initially being planned, it was reported that the second division would initially consist of the 12 teams that successfully qualify for the 2027 Men's Rugby World Cup through the qualification process, meaning all the qualified teams for the 2027 tournament would take part in the inaugural edition of either the Nations Championship itself or the second division competition. On 17 November 2025, World Rugby confirmed that the second division competition would be called the World Rugby Nations Cup.

At the same time, it was announced that in Rugby World Cup and British & Irish Lions years, when the Nations Championship and Nations Cup are not played, 'cross competition matches' between the Nations Championship teams and the Nations Cup teams will be prioritised.

== Teams ==
With no promotion or relegation in the first two editions, the following teams will contest both the inaugural tournament and the second edition:

Nations Championship
Team	Competition	Region
Europe, Africa, and Asia Pool
Georgia	Rugby Europe Championship	Europe
Hong Kong	Asia Rugby Championship	Asia
Portugal	Rugby Europe Championship	Europe
Spain	Rugby Europe Championship	Europe
Romania	Rugby Europe Championship	Europe
Zimbabwe	Rugby Africa Cup	Africa
Americas and Pacific Pool
Canada	Pacific Nations Cup	North America
Chile	South American Rugby Championship	South America
Samoa	Pacific Nations Cup	Oceania
Tonga	Pacific Nations Cup	Oceania
United States	Pacific Nations Cup	North America
Uruguay	South American Rugby Championship	South America

As with the Nations Championship the initial competition will consist of two broadly geographic pools, an America-Pacific pool consisting of the four Americas teams plus Tonga and Samoa and a European-African-Asian pool, consisting of the four European sides, Zimbabwe and Hong Kong. For the first two editions in 2026 and 2028, there will not be a finals day, and two champions will be crowned, one in each pool. In addition, Samoa, Tonga, Zimbabwe and Hong Kong will play their home matches in neutral venues; in the case of Samoa and Tonga, in the Americas and in the case of Hong Kong and Zimbabwe, in Europe.

== See also ==
- WXV Global Series Challenger
