= 2026 U20 Rugby Championship =

International Rugby Championship

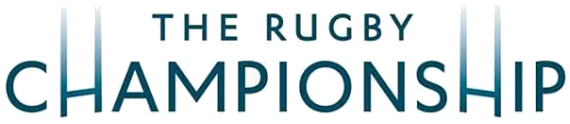

Tournament details
- Host: South Africa
- Date: 27 April – 9 May 2026
- Countries: Argentina; Australia; New Zealand; South Africa

Final positions
- Champions: South Africa (1st title)

Tournament statistics
- Matches played: 6
- Tries scored: 58 (9.67 per match)
- Top scorer(s): Yaqeen Ahmed (42)
- Most tries: Jack Benade (4)

The 2026 U20 Rugby Championship, also known as 2026 TRC U20, was the third edition of the rugby union competition, the U20 Rugby Championship, the under-20 equivalent of The Rugby Championship, played by senior men's teams of Argentina, Australia, New Zealand, and South Africa. The South African U20 side claimed their first title after playing a draw with the New Zealand U20 side 29-29 on 9 May 2026 in the last pool match. The tournament dates and venue were announced in March 2026, hosted by South Africa, with every match played at the Nelson Mandela Bay Stadium in Gqeberha (formerly called Port Elizabeth), Eastern Cape.

New Zealand were the defending champions. Last year, the New Zealand U20 side defended their title, defeating the hosts South Africa 48–45.

== Venue ==
The venue was confirmed in March 2026, a month prior to the tournaments scheduled start date.

North End (Gqeberha)
Nelson Mandela Bay Stadium
Capacity: 46,000
2026 U20 Rugby Championship is located in Eastern Cape
2026 U20 Rugby Championship is located in South Africa

== Table ==
Pos	Team	Pld	W	D	L	PF	PA	PD	TF	TA	TB	LB	Pts
1	South Africa (H, C)	3	2	1	0	133	67	+66	20	11	3	0	13
2	New Zealand	3	1	1	1	80	83	−3	14	13	2	0	8
3	Argentina	3	1	0	2	76	97	−21	11	16	2	1	7
4	Australia	3	1	0	2	78	120	−42	13	18	2	1	7

Updated to match(es) played on 9 May 2026. Source: All Rugby
(C) Champion; (H) Host

== Fixtures ==
Fixtures were announced alongside the tournament venue and dates (March 2026).

=== Round 1 ===
27 April
14:00 SAST (UTC+02)

New Zealand (1 BP)	34–29	Australia (2 BP)
Try: Norrie 5' m, 46' m Stuart 16' c Wiseman 64' c Woodley 66' m Williams 68' m Con: Muliaina (2/6) 17', 65'	Report	Try: Le Maitre 8' c Whitfield 21' m Taka 24' m Mackay 35' c Jaques 57' m Con: Mackay (2/5) 9', 36'; Cards: Watters (red card) 54'; Grover (yellow card) 62'

Nelson Mandela Bay Stadium
Attendance: 10,000+
Referee: Hanru van Rooyen (South Africa)

FB	15	Cohen Norrie	(substituted off) 54' (substituted on) 60'
RW	14	Oliver Guerin
OC	13	David Lewai	(substituted off) 60'
IC	12	Haki Wiseman
LW	11	Siale Pahulu	(substituted off) 58'
FH	10	Mika Muliaina
SH	9	Charlie Sinton	(substituted off) 75'
N8	8	Patrick Mauga	(substituted off) 58'
BF	7	Caleb Woodley
OF	6	Finn McLeod
RL	5	Jake Frost
LL	4	Max Fale	(substituted off) 50'
TP	3	Dane Johnston	(substituted off) 50'
HK	2	Josh Findlay
LP	1	Henry Stuart	(substituted off) 50'
Replacements:
HK	16	Luka Patumaka Makata
PR	17	Ethan Webber	(substituted on) 50'
PR	18	Alexander Hewitt	(substituted on) 50'
LK	19	John Falloon	(substituted on) 50'
N8	20	Micah Fale	(substituted on) 58'
SH	21	Jackson Hughan	(substituted on) 75'
FH	22	Jay Reihana	(substituted on) 54'
RW	23	Logan Williams	(substituted on) 58'
Coaches:
(New Zealand) Jarrad Hoeata
(New Zealand) Alex Robertson

FB	15	Louis Fenwicke
RW	14	Riley Whitfeld
OC	13	Leo Jaques
IC	12	Frankie Goldsbrough		(substituted off) 19'
LW	11	Cooper Watters	(red card) 54'
FH	10	Finn Mackay
SH	9	Angus Grover	(yellow card) 62' to 72'	(substituted off) 73'
N8	8	Eli Langi
BF	7	Marshall Le Maitre		(substituted off) 64'
OF	6	Tom Robinson
RL	5	Isaac Fonua		(substituted off) 80'
LL	4	Will Ross
TP	3	Edwin Langi		(substituted off) 80'
HK	2	Ewald Kruger		(substituted off) 69'
LP	1	Jacob Job		(substituted off) 80'
Replacements:
HK	16	Tyler Maybery		(substituted on) 69'
PR	17	Harper Strachan		(substituted on) 80'
PR	18	Jonah Rangiwai		(substituted on) 80'
LK	19	Kenneth Harris		(substituted on) 80'
N8	20	Cooper Eagle		(substituted on) 73'
SH	21	Sam Blank		(substituted on) 67'
OC	22	Jonty Fowler
LW	23	Taione Taka		(substituted on) 19'
Coach:
(Australia) Chris Whitaker

Assistant referees:
Sean Muller (South Africa)
Lulutho Matomela (South Africa)
Television match official:
Egon Seconds (South Africa)

27 April
16:10 SAST (UTC+02)

South Africa (1BP)	48–21	Argentina
Try: Adams 5' m, 26' c Schoeman 9' c Ahmed 16' c Benade 19' m, 34' m, 55' m Reid 51' c Con: Ahmed (4/8) 10', 17', 26', 52'	Report	Try: Torre 62' c, 80' c Dande 74' c Con: Giannantonio (3/3) 63', 75', 80'

Nelson Mandela Bay Stadium
Attendance: 10,398
Referee: Gonzalo de Achaval (Argentina)

FB	15	Alzeadon Felix
RW	14	Jack Benade	(substituted off) 75'
OC	13	Samuel Badenhorst
IC	12	Ethan Adams	(substituted off) 64'
LW	11	Lindsey Jansen
FH	10	Yaqeen Ahmed
SH	9	Hendre Schoeman	(substituted off) 61'
N8	8	Kebotile Maake	(substituted off) 57'
BF	7	Thomas Beling
OF	6	Luke Cannon	(substituted off) 49'
RL	5	Riley Norton (c)
LL	4	Heinrich Theron
TP	3	Danie Kruger	(substituted off) 49'
HK	2	Liam van Wyk	(substituted off) 57'
LP	1	Rambo Kubheka	(substituted off) 49'
Replacements:
HK	16	Mahle Sithole	(substituted on) 57'
PR	17	Olliver Reid	(substituted on) 49'
PR	18	Kai Pratt	(substituted on) 49'
LK	19	JD Hattingh	(substituted on) 49'
N8	20	Risima Khosa	(substituted on) 57'
SH	21	Jayden Brits	(substituted on) 61'
FH	22	Vusi Moyo	(substituted on) 64'
RW	23	Kuthadzo Rasivhaga	(substituted on) 75'
Coach:
(South Africa) Kevin Foote

FB	15	Luciano Avaca
RW	14	Constantino Keller
OC	13	Ramon Fernandez	(substituted off) 68'
IC	12	Pedro Coll
LW	11	Mateo Tanoni	(substituted off) 49'
FH	10	Manuel Giannantonio
SH	9	Ignacio Zabella	(substituted off) 54'
N8	8	Basilio Canas	(substituted off) 54'
BF	7	Joaquin Pascual Viale
OF	6	Tomas Dande (c)
RL	5	Agustin Ponzio
LL	4	Jeremy Annand	(substituted off) 49'
TP	3	Bautista Salinas Mealla	(substituted off) 68'
HK	2	Nicolas Cambiasso	(substituted off) 57'
LP	1	Benjamin Farias Cerioni	(substituted off) 57'
Replacements:
HK	16	Manuel Cuneo Camargo	(substituted on) 57'
PR	17	Fabrizio Cebron	(substituted on) 57'
PR	18	Federico Narvaez	(substituted on) 68'
LK	19	Jeronimo Sorondo	(substituted on) 49'
N8	20	Federico Torre	(substituted on) 54'
SH	21	Juan Preumayr	(substituted on) 54'
OC	22	Benjamin Ordiz	(substituted on) 68'
LW	23	Simon Pfister	(substituted on) 49'
Coach:
(Argentina) José Pellicena

Assistant referees:
Sean Muller (South Africa)
Lulutho Matomela (South Africa)
Television match official:
Egon Seconds (South Africa)

=== Round 2 ===
3 May
14:00 SAST (UTC+02)

New Zealand	17–25	Argentina
Try: Wiseman 33' c van der Westhuizen 40' m McLeod 74' m Con: Norrie (1/3) 34'; Cards: Frost (yellow card) 35'; Webber (yellow card) 36'	Report	Try: Serpa 16' m Penalty Try 37'; Avaca 56' m Miranda 71' m Con: Serpa (0/3); Pen: Serpa (1/1) 25'

Nelson Mandela Bay Stadium
Attendance: 10,000+
Referee: Ella Goldsmith (Australia)

FB	15	Cohen Norrie
RW	14	Jay Reihana
OC	13	Ollie Guerin		(substituted off) 65'
IC	12	Jack Wiseman
LW	11	JD van der Westhuizen		(substituted off) 59'
FH	10	Mika Muliaina
SH	9	Charlie Sinton		(substituted off) 40'
N8	8	Finn McLeod
BF	7	Kobe Brownlee
OF	6	Logan Platt		(substituted off) 53'
RL	5	Jake Frost	(yellow card) 35' to 45'
LL	4	Max Fale		(substituted off) 49'
TP	3	Alex Hewitt		(substituted off) 49'
HK	2	Josh Findlay		(substituted off) 58'
LP	1	Ethan Webber	(yellow card) 36' to 46'	(substituted off) 65'
Replacements:
HK	16	Luka Patumaka Makata		(substituted on) 58'
PR	17	Charlie Wallis		(substituted on) 65'
PR	18	Dane Johnston		(substituted on) 49'
LK	19	John Falloon		(substituted on) 49'
N8	20	Micah Fale		(substituted on) 53'
SH	21	Boston Krone		(substituted on) 40'
FH	22	Angus Revell		(substituted on) 65'
RW	23	Logan Williams		(substituted on) 59'
Coaches:
(New Zealand) Jarrad Hoeata
(New Zealand) Alex Robertson

FB	15	Simon Pfister
RW	14	Bautista Quiroga Miguens	(substituted off) 41'
OC	13	Pedro Coll
IC	12	Benjamin Ordiz
LW	11	Luciano Avaca
FH	10	Federico Serpa	(substituted off) 65'
SH	9	Juan Preumayr
N8	8	Federico Torre
BF	7	Jeronimo Sorondo	(substituted off) 46'
OF	6	Franco Marizza	(substituted off) 29' (substituted on) 34'
RL	5	Bautista Benavides	(substituted off) 65'
LL	4	Joaquin Pascual Viale
TP	3	Bautista Salinas Mealla
HK	2	Manuel Cuneo	(substituted off) 54'
LP	1	Fabrizio Cebron	(substituted off) 51'
Replacements:
HK	16	Nicolas Cambiasso	(substituted on) 54'
PR	17	Benjamin Farias Cerioni	(substituted on) 51'
PR	18	German Tello Fredes
LK	19	Augustin Ponzio	(substituted on) 65'
N8	20	Basilio Canas	(substituted on) 29' (substituted off) 34'
SH	21	Benjamin Ledesma Arocena	(substituted on) 65'
OC	22	Ramon Fernandez Miranda	(substituted on) 69'
LW	23	Manuel Giannantonio	(substituted on) 41'
Coach:
(Argentina) José Pellicena

Assistant referees:
Christopher Allison (South Africa)
Lulutho Matomela (South Africa)
Television match official:
Ben Crouse (South Africa)

3 May
16:10 SAST (UTC+02)

South Africa (1 BP)	56–17	Australia
Try: Benade 14' c Vyambwera 20' c Penalty Try 26', 34'; Adams 52' c Schoeman 58' c Cannon 67' c Ahmed 74' c Con: Ahmed (4/4) 15', 21', 53', 59'; Moyo (2/2) 68', 75'	Report	Try: Mackay 32' c Whitfield 36' m Taka 64' m Con: Mackay (1/3) 32'

Nelson Mandela Bay Stadium
Attendance: 10,000+
Referee: Gonzalo de Achaval (Argentina)

FB	15	Akahluwa Boqwana	(substituted off) 71'
RW	14	Jack Benade
OC	13	Samuel Badenhorst
IC	12	Ethan Adams	(substituted off) 65'
LW	11	Khuthadzo Rasivhaga
FH	10	Yaqeen Ahmed
SH	9	Hendre Schoeman	(substituted off) 65'
N8	8	Kebotile Maake	(substituted off) 57'
BF	7	Wasi Vyambwera
OF	6	Luke Cannon
RL	5	Riley Norton (c)
LL	4	Heinrich Theron	(substituted off) 61'
TP	3	Danie Kruger	(substituted off) 50'
HK	2	Liam van Wyk	(substituted off) 70'
LP	1	Rambo Kubheka	(substituted off) 51'
Replacements:
HK	16	Mahle Sithole	(substituted on) 70'
PR	17	Olliver Reid	(substituted on) 51'
PR	18	Luan van der Berg	(substituted on) 50'
LK	19	JD Hattingh	(substituted on) 61'
N8	20	Gert Kemp	(substituted on) 57'
SH	21	Jayden Brits	(substituted on) 65'
FH	22	Vusi Moyo	(substituted on) 65'
RW	23	Jade Muller	(substituted on) 71'
Coach:
(South Africa) Kevin Foote

FB	15	Louis Fenwicke		(substituted off) 66'
RW	14	Riley Whitfeld
OC	13	Leo Jaques	(yellow card) 16' to 26'
IC	12	Zach Fittler		(substituted off) 60'
LW	11	Tai Taka	(yellow card) 34' to 44'
FH	10	Finn Mackay		(substituted off) 41'
SH	9	Angus Grover
N8	8	Eli Langi		(substituted off) 67'
BF	7	Tom Robinson (c)
OF	6	Luca Cleverley		(substituted off) 59'
RL	5	Isaac Fonua	(yellow card) 26' to 36'	(substituted off) 57'
LL	4	Will Ross
TP	3	Edwin Langi		(substituted off) 57'
HK	2	Ewald Kruger		(substituted off) 66'
LP	1	Jacob Job		(substituted off) 57'
Replacements:
HK	16	Tyler Maybery		(substituted on) 66'
PR	17	Nicholas Hill		(substituted on) 57'
PR	18	Jonah Rangiwai		(substituted on) 57'
LK	19	Kenneth Harris		(substituted on) 57'
N8	20	Toby Brial		(substituted on) 59'
SH	21	Marshall Le Maitrek		(substituted on) 67'
OC	22	Jonty Fowler		(substituted on) 41'
LW	23	Chayse Geros		(substituted on) 60'
Coach:
(Australia) Chris Whitaker

Assistant referees:
Christopher Allison (South Africa)
Lulutho Matomela (South Africa)
Television match official:
Ben Crouse (South Africa)

=== Round 3 ===
9 May
14:00 SAST (UTC+02)

Argentina	30–32	Australia
Try: Cuneo 29' c Arocena 66' c Cebron 71' m, 78' m Con: Serpa (2/3) 30', 67'; Giannantonio (0/1); Pen: Serpa (2/2) 37', 77'; Cards: Benavides (yellow card) 32'		Try: Langi 4' c, 48' c Jaques 33' m Robinson 39' m Kruger 43' m Con: Fowler (2/5) 5', 49'; Pen: Fowler (1/1) 75'

Nelson Mandela Bay Stadium
Referee: Christopher Allison (South Africa)

FB	15	Simon Pfister
RW	14	Benjamin Ledesma Arocena
OC	13	Pedro Coll
IC	12	Benjamin Ordiz
LW	11	Luciano Avaca
FH	10	Federico Serpa		(substituted off) 77'
SH	9	Juan Preumayr		(substituted off) 61'
N8	8	Federico Torre		(substituted off) 62'
BF	7	Jeronimo Sorondo		(substituted off) 53'
OF	6	Tomas Dande		(substituted off) 53'
RL	5	Bautista Benavides	(yellow card) 32' to 42'
LL	4	Joaquin Pascual Viale
TP	3	Bautista Salinas Mealla		(substituted off) 67'
HK	2	Manuel Cuneo		(substituted off) 45'
LP	1	Benjamin Farias Cerioni		(substituted off) 44'
Replacements:
HK	16	Nicolas Cambiasso		(substituted on) 45'
PR	17	Fabrizio Cebron		(substituted on) 44'
PR	18	Federico Narvaez		(substituted on) 67'
LK	19	Toribio Latorre		(substituted on) 53'
N8	20	Franco Marizza		(substituted on) 53'
SH	21	Ignacio Zabella		(substituted on) 61'
OC	22	Ramon Fernandez Miranda		(substituted on) 62'
LW	23	Manuel Giannantonio		(substituted on) 77'
Coach:
(Argentina) José Pellicena

FB	15	Louis Fenwicke	(substituted off) 66'
RW	14	Riley Whitfeld
OC	13	Leo Jaques
IC	12	Zach Fittler	(substituted off) 60'
LW	11	Tai Taka
FH	10	Finn Mackay	(substituted off) 41'
SH	9	Angus Grover
N8	8	Eli Langi	(substituted off) 67'
BF	7	Tom Robinson (c)
OF	6	Luca Cleverley	(substituted off) 59'
RL	5	Isaac Fonua	(substituted off) 57'
LL	4	Will Ross
TP	3	Edwin Langi	(substituted off) 57'
HK	2	Ewald Kruger	(substituted off) 66'
LP	1	Jacob Job	(substituted off) 57'
Replacements:
HK	16	Tyler Maybery	(substituted on) 66'
PR	17	Nicholas Hill	(substituted on) 57'
PR	18	Jonah Rangiwai	(substituted on) 57'
LK	19	Kenneth Harris	(substituted on) 57'
N8	20	Toby Brial	(substituted on) 59'
SH	21	Marshall Le Maitrek	(substituted on) 67'
OC	22	Jonty Fowler	(substituted on) 41'
LW	23	Chayse Geros	(substituted on) 60'
Coach:
(Australia) Chris Whitaker

Assistant referees:
Sean Muller (South Africa)
Lulutho Matomela (South Africa)
Television match official:
Marius Jonker (South Africa)

9 May
16:10 SAST (UTC+02)

South Africa	29–29	New Zealand
Try: Boqwana 10' m, 36' c Maake 29' c Badenhorst 42' c Con: Ahmed (3/4) 30', 37', 43'; Pen: Ahmed (1/1) 5'; Cards: Benade (yellow card) 77'		Try: Johnston 7' m Guerin 15' m Woodley 21' m McLeod 48' c Penalty Try 77'; Con: Muliaina (1/4) 49'; Cards: Pahulu (red card) 67'

Nelson Mandela Bay Stadium
Attendance: 18,138
Referee: Ella Goldsmith (Australia)

FB	15	Akahluwa Boqwana		(substituted off) 76'
RW	14	Jack Benade	(yellow card) 77'
OC	13	Samuel Badenhorst
IC	12	Ethan Adams		(substituted off) 34'
LW	11	Khuthadzo Rasivhaga
FH	10	Yaqeen Ahmed
SH	9	Hendre Schoeman		(substituted off) 72'
N8	8	Kebotile Maake		(substituted off) 50'
BF	7	Wasi Vyambwera
OF	6	Luke Cannon
RL	5	Riley Norton (c)
LL	4	Heinrich Theron		(substituted off) 63'
TP	3	Danie Kruger		(substituted off) 50'
HK	2	Liam van Wyk		(substituted off) 68'
LP	1	Rambo Kubheka		(substituted off) 50'
Replacements:
HK	16	Mahle Sithole		(substituted on) 68'
PR	17	Olliver Reid		(substituted on) 50'
PR	18	Luan van der Berg		(substituted on) 50'
LK	19	JD Hattingh		(substituted on) 63'
N8	20	Risima Khosa		(substituted on) 50'
SH	21	Jayden Brits		(substituted on) 72'
FH	22	Vusi Moyo		(substituted on) 34'
RW	23	Jade Muller		(substituted on) 76'
Coach:
(South Africa) Kevin Foote

FB	15	Cohen Norrie		(substituted off) 19'
RW	14	Oliver Guerin
OC	13	Siale Pahulu	(red card) 67'
IC	12	Haki Wiseman
LW	11	Logan Wiliams
FH	10	Mika Muliaina
SH	9	Charlie Sinton		(substituted off) 68'
N8	8	Patrick Mauga		(substituted off) 58'
BF	7	Caleb Woodley		(substituted off) 71'
OF	6	Finn McLeod
RL	5	Jake Frost
LL	4	Max Fale		(substituted off) 58'
TP	3	Dane Johnston		(substituted off) 51'
HK	2	Josh Findlay		(substituted off) 68'
LP	1	Henry Stuart		(substituted off) 51'
Replacements:
HK	16	Jericho Wharehinga		(substituted on) 68'
PR	17	Ethan Webber		(substituted on) 51'
PR	18	Alexander Hewitt		(substituted on) 51'
LK	19	John Falloon		(substituted on) 58'
N8	20	Micah Fale		(substituted on) 58'
SH	21	Jackson Hughan		(substituted on) 68'
FH	22	David Lewai		(substituted on) 19'
RW	23	Kobe Brownlee		(substituted on) 71'
Coaches:
(New Zealand) Jarrad Hoeata
(New Zealand) Alex Robertson

Assistant referees:
Sean Muller (South Africa)
Lulutho Matomela (South Africa)
Television match official:
Marius Jonker (South Africa)

== Statistics ==
The following players are the 2026 U20 Rugby Championship leaders:

=== Points scorers ===
Pos.	Name	Team	Pts.
1	Yaqeen Ahmed	South Africa	42
2	Jack Benade	South Africa	20
3	Federico Serpa	Argentina	18
4	Finn Mackay	Australia	16
5	Ethan Adams	South Africa	15
6	Cohen Norrie	New Zealand	12
7	Federico Torre	Argentina	10
7	Benjamin Ledesma Arocena	Argentina	10
7	Hendre Schoeman	South Africa	10
7	Akahluwa Boqwana	South Africa	10
7	Jack Wiseman	New Zealand	10
7	Finn McLeod	New Zealand	10
7	Caleb Woodley	New Zealand	10
7	Tai Taka	Australia	10
7	Riley Whitfield	Australia	10
7	Leo Jaques	Australia	10
7	Edwin Langi	Australia	10
18	Jonty Fowler	Australia	7
19	Manuel Giannantonio	Argentina	6
19	Mika Muliaina	New Zealand	6
21	Wasi Vyambwera	South Africa	5
21	Oliver Reid	South Africa	5
21	Kebotile Maake	South Africa	5
21	Luke Cannon	South Africa	5
21	Samuel Badenhorst	South Africa	5
21	Tomas Dande	Argentina	5
21	Ramon Fernandez Miranda	Argentina	5
21	Luciano Avaca	Argentina	5
21	Fabrizio Cebron	Argentina	5
21	Manuel Cuneo	Argentina	5
21	JD van der Westhuizen	New Zealand	5
21	Henry Stuart	New Zealand	5
21	Dane Johnston	New Zealand	5
21	Ollie Guerin	New Zealand	5
21	Logan Williams	New Zealand	5
21	Marshall Le Maitre	Australia	5
21	Tom Robinson	Australia	5
21	Ewald Kruger	Australia	5
39	Vusi Moyo	South Africa	4

=== Try scorers ===
Pos.	Name	Team	Tries
1	Jack Benade	South Africa	4
2	Ethan Adams	South Africa	3
3	Cohen Norrie	New Zealand	2
3	Jack Wiseman	New Zealand	2
3	Finn McLeod	New Zealand	2
3	Caleb Woodley	New Zealand	2
3	Hendre Schoeman	South Africa	2
3	Yaqeen Ahmed	South Africa	2
3	Akahluwa Boqwana	South Africa	2
3	Benjamin Ledesma Arocena	Argentina	2
3	Federico Torre	Argentina	2
3	Riley Whitfield	Australia	2
3	Finn Mackay	Australia	2
3	Tai Taka	Australia	2
3	Leo Jaques	Australia	2
3	Edwin Langi	Australia	2
18	Dane Johnston	New Zealand	1
18	Henry Stuart	New Zealand	1
18	Jean van der Westhuizen	New Zealand	1
18	Logan Williams	New Zealand	1
18	Ollie Guerin	New Zealand	1
18	Marshall Le Maitre	Australia	1
18	Tom Robinson	Australia	1
18	Ewald Kruger	Australia	1
18	Federico Serpa	Argentina	1
18	Tomas Dande	Argentina	1
18	Ramon Fernandez Miranda	Argentina	1
18	Luciano Avaca	Argentina	1
18	Fabrizio Cebron	Argentina	1
18	Manuel Cuneo	Argentina	1
18	Oliver Reid	South Africa	1
18	Luke Cannon	South Africa	1
18	Wasi Vyambwera	South Africa	1
18	Samuel Badenhorst	South Africa	1
18	Kebotile Maake	South Africa	1

=== Metres gained ===
Pos.	Name	Team	m
1	Luciano Avaca	Argentina	279
2	Ethan Adams	South Africa	187
3	Yaqeen Ahmed	South Africa	186
3	Simon Pfister	Argentina	186
5	Jack Benade	South Africa	170
5	Logan Williams	New Zealand	170
7	Leo Jacques	Australia	161
8	Khuti Rasivhaga	South Africa	147
9	Mika Muliaina	New Zealand	136
10	Akahluwa Boqwana	South Africa	129

=== Defenders beaten ===
Pos.	Name	Team	DB
1	Ethan Adams	South Africa	23
2	Luciano Avaca	Argentina	16
3	Yaqeen Ahmed	South Africa	15
4	Cohen Norrie	New Zealand	13
4	Leo Jacques	Australia	13
6	Simon Pfister	Argentina	11
7	Jack Benda	South Africa	9
7	Kebotile Maake	South Africa	9
9	Pedro Coll	Argentina	8
10	Finn Mackay	Australia	7
10	Khuti Rasivhaga	South Africa	7

*Stats correct as on May 11, 2026 (Round 3)

== See also ==
- 2026 World Rugby U20 Championship
- 2026 Six Nations U20 Championship
