= 2015 World Rugby Tbilisi Cup =

Tournament details
- Countries: Emerging Ireland; Emerging Italy; Georgia; Uruguay
- Date: 13 – 21 June 2015

Tournament statistics
- Teams: 4
- Matches played: 6
- Tries scored: 26 (4.33 per match)
- Top point scorer(s): (Italy) Carlo Canna (29)
- Top try scorer(s): (Ireland) Andrew Conway (3)

Final
- Champions: Emerging Ireland (1st title)
- Runners-up: Emerging Italy

The 2015 World Rugby Tbilisi Cup was the third edition of this international rugby union tournament, created by World Rugby. It was played from 13 to 21 June 2015 at the Avchala Stadium in Tbilisi, running alongside the 2015 World Rugby Nations Cup in Romania. The hosts Georgia were joined by 2015 Rugby World Cup counterparts Uruguay, and development sides Emerging Ireland and Emerging Italy.

Emerging Ireland won the tournament with three from three victories, taking the Tbilisi Cup for their first ever time.

== Standings ==
	Team	Games				Points			Tries		Bonus points	Points
	Team	Played	Won	Drawn	Lost	For	Against	Difference	For	Against	Bonus points	Points
1	Emerging Ireland	3	3	0	0	103	19	+84	15	3	3	15
2	Emerging Italy	3	2	0	1	49	48	+1	4	6	0	8
3	Georgia	3	1	0	2	41	81	–40	4	9	0	4
4	Uruguay	3	0	0	3	30	75	–45	3	8	0	0
Source : www.worldrugby.org Points breakdown: *4 points for a win *2 points for a draw *1 bonus point for a loss by seven points or less *1 bonus point for scoring four or more tries in a match

== Fixtures ==
The fixtures were announced on 6 May 2015.

=== Matchday 1 ===
13 June 2015
17:00 GET (UTC+4)

Emerging Italy	0–25	Emerging Ireland
	Match stats	Try: Griffin 13' m Conway 24' m McCloskey 27' c O'Halloran 80' c Con: Hanrahan (1/4) 28'; Pen: Hanrahan (1/1) 5'

Referee: Mathieu Raynal (France)

FB	15	Alberto Chiesa (c)
RW	14	Filippo Guarducci		(substituted off) 20'	(substituted on) 29'	(substituted off) 55'	(substituted on) 66'
OC	13	Roberto Quartaroli
IC	12	Giovanni Massaro		(substituted off) 28'
LW	11	Gabriele Di Giulio
FH	10	Carlo Canna
SH	9	Simone Marinaro
N8	8	Maxime Mbanda
OF	7	Emiliano Caffini		(substituted off) 45'
BF	6	Matteo Corazzi		(substituted off) 54'
RL	5	Filippo Gerosa		(substituted off) 72'
LL	4	Federico Ruzza
TP	3	George Giovani Iacob				(substituted off) 50'
HK	2	Luca Bigi		(substituted off) 40'
LP	1	Federico Zani	(yellow card) 18' to 28'	(substituted off) 52'		(substituted on) 55'	(substituted off) 66'
Replacements:
HK	16	Oliviero Fabiani		(substituted on) 40'
PR	17	Giuseppe Di Stefano		(substituted on) 52'
PR	18	Pietro Ceccarelli	(yellow card) 55' to 65'	(substituted on) 20'	(substituted off) 29'	(substituted on) 50'
FL	19	Alessio Zdrilich		(substituted on) 54'
N8	20	Mirko Amenta		(substituted on) 72'
SH	21	Simone Parisotto
CE	22	Giovanni Benvenuti		(substituted on) 28'
LK	23	Sebastian Negri		(substituted on) 45'
Coach:
(Italy) Umberto Casellato

FB	15	Tiernan O'Halloran
RW	14	Andrew Conway		(substituted off) 61'
OC	13	Eoin Griffin
IC	12	Stuart McCloskey		(substituted off) 66'
LW	11	Matt Healy
FH	10	JJ Hanrahan
SH	9	Luke McGrath		(substituted off) 59'
N8	8	Jack Conan
OF	7	Dan Leavy
BF	6	Rhys Ruddock (c)		(substituted off) 55'
RL	5	Billy Holland		(substituted off) 62'
LL	4	Ben Marshall
TP	3	Stephen Archer		(substituted off) 54'
HK	2	Rob Herring		(substituted off) 50'
LP	1	Denis Buckley		(substituted off) 54'
Replacements:
PR	16	Dave Heffernan		(substituted on) 50'
HK	17	Andrew Warwick	(yellow card) 74' to 80'	(substituted on) 54'
PR	18	Finlay Bealham		(substituted on) 54'
FL	19	Andrew Browne		(substituted on) 62'
FL	20	Eoghan Masterson		(substituted on) 55'
SH	21	John Cooney		(substituted on) 59'
FH	22	Rory Scannell		(substituted on) 66'
FB	23	Peter Nelson		(substituted on) 61'
Coach:
(Ireland) Allen Clarke

13 June 2015
19:00 GET (UTC+4)

Georgia	19–10	Uruguay
Try: Mikautadze 7' c Con: Tsiklauri (1/1) 8'; Pen: Tsiklauri (3/6) 12', 38', 66'; Malaghuradze (1/1) 80'	Stats	Try: Gibernau 30' c Con: Ormaechea (1/1) 31'; Pen: Ormaechea (1/2) 15'

Referee: Marius Mitrea (Italy)

FB	15	Beka Tsiklauri
RW	14	Giorgi Aptsiauri
OC	13	Revaz Gigauri		(substituted off) 63'
IC	12	Merab Sharikadze		(substituted off) 79'
LW	11	Giorgi Pruidze
FH	10	Lasha Malaghuradze
SH	9	Giorgi Begadze		(substituted off) 63'
N8	8	Beka Bitsadz
OF	7	Lasha Lomidze	(yellow card) 30' to 60'
BF	6	Saba Shubitidze		(substituted off) 25'	(substituted on) 33'	(substituted off) 60'
RL	5	Konstantin Mikautadze		(substituted off) 54'
LL	4	Levan Datunashvili (c)
TP	3	Nikoloz Khatiashvili	(yellow card) 22' to 32'			(substituted off) 71'
HK	2	Jaba Bregvadze		(substituted off) 79'
LP	1	Giorgi Tetrashvili		(substituted off) 60'
Replacements:
PR	16	Giorgi Tedoradze		(substituted on) 79'
HK	17	Archil Bezhiashvili		(substituted on) 60'
PR	18	Irakli Mirtskhulava		(substituted on) 25'	(substituted off) 33'	(substituted on) 71'
LK	19	Giorgi Chkhaidze	(yellow card) 61' to 71'	(substituted on) 54'
FL	20	Beka Gorgadze		(substituted on) 60'
SH	21	Vazha Khutsishvili		(substituted on) 63'
CE	22	Giorgi Talakhadze		(substituted on) 79'
WG	23	Tamaz Mtchedlidze		(substituted on) 63'
Coach:
(New Zealand) Milton Haig

FB	15	Gastón Mieres
RW	14	Leandro Leivas		(substituted off) 53'
OC	13	Joaquín Prada
IC	12	Alberto Román
LW	11	Santiago Gibernau
FH	10	Manuel Blengio		(substituted off) 71'
SH	9	Agustín Ormaechea
N8	8	Juan Manuel Gaminara
OF	7	Fernando Bascou		(substituted off) 53'
BF	6	Matías Beer		(substituted off) 73'
RL	5	Jorge Zerbino	(yellow card) 52' to 62'	(substituted off) 73'
LL	4	Santiago Vilaseca (c)
TP	3	Mario Sagario		(substituted off) 47'
HK	2	Nicolás Klappenbach		(substituted off) 47'
LP	1	Alejo Corral		(substituted off) 63'
Replacements:
HK	16	Germán Kessler		(substituted on) 47'
PR	17	Carlos Arboleya		(substituted on) 47'
PR	18	Mateo Sanguinetti		(substituted on) 63'
LK	19	Mathias Palomeque		(substituted on) 73'
FL	20	Diego Magno		(substituted on) 53'
N8	21	Mathias Braun		(substituted on) 73'
SH	22	Alejo Durán		(substituted on) 71'
WG	23	Jerónimo Etcheverry		(substituted on) 53'
Coach:
(Uruguay) Pablo Lemoine

=== Matchday 2 ===
17 June 2015
17:00 GET (UTC+4)

Uruguay	7–33	Emerging Ireland
Try: Penalty try 71' c Con: Ormaechea (1/1) 72'	Report	Try: Conway 5' c Cooney 10' m Kelleher 13' c Penalty try 40' c Marshall 79' c Con: Scannell (4/5) 6', 15', 40', 80'

Referee: Marius Mitrea (Italy)

FB	15	Jerónimo Etcheverry		(substituted off) 70'
RW	14	Leandro Leivas (c)
OC	13	Joaquín Prada		(substituted off) 65'
IC	12	Andrés Vilaseca
LW	11	Santiago Gibernau
FH	10	Alejo Durán
SH	9	Agustín Ormaechea
N8	8	Alejandro Nieto
OF	7	Diego Magno		(substituted off) 64'
BF	6	Agustín Alonso	(yellow card) 38' to 48'	(substituted off) 65'
RL	5	Mathias Palomeque		(substituted off) 40'
LL	4	Franco Lamanna
TP	3	Carlos Arboleya		(substituted off) 56'
HK	2	Germán Kessler		(substituted off) 52'
LP	1	Mateo Sanguinetti		(substituted off) 52'
Replacements:
HK	16	Nicolás Klappenbach		(substituted on) 52'
PR	17	Mario Sagario		(substituted on) 56'
PR	18	Alejo Corral		(substituted on) 52'
LK	19	Santiago Vilaseca		(substituted on) 64'
FL	20	Fernando Bascou		(substituted on) 65'
N8	21	Mathias Braun		(substituted on) 40'
FH	22	Manuel Blengio		(substituted on) 65'
CE	23	Alberto Román		(substituted on) 70'
Coach:
(Uruguay) Pablo Lemoine

FB	15	Peter Nelson
RW	14	Cian Kelleher	(yellow card) 62' to 72'
OC	13	Eoin Griffin
IC	12	Noel Reid
LW	11	Andrew Conway
FH	10	Rory Scannell
SH	9	John Cooney
N8	8	Eoghan Masterson		(substituted off) 60'
OF	7	Frankie Taggart
BF	6	Rhys Ruddock (c)
RL	5	Billy Holland		(substituted off) 50'
LL	4	Andrew Browne
TP	3	Stephen Archer		(substituted off) 50'
HK	2	Dave Heffernan		(substituted off) 60'
LP	1	James Cronin		(substituted off) 59'
Replacements:
PR	16	Rob Herring		(substituted on) 60'
HK	17	Denis Buckley		(substituted on) 59'
PR	18	Andrew Warwick		(substituted on) 50'
FL	19	Ben Marshall		(substituted on) 50'
FL	20	Dan Leavy
N8	21	Jack Conan		(substituted on) 60'
SH	22	Luke McGrath
FH	23	JJ Hanrahan
Coach:
(Ireland) Allen Clarke

17 June 2015
19:00 GET (UTC+4)

Georgia	10–26	Emerging Italy
Try: Gorgadze 80' c Con: Tsiklauri (1/1) 80'; Pen: Malaghuradze (1/1) 8'	Stats	Try: Marinaro 58' c Mbanda 65' c Con: Canna (2/2) 58', 65'; Pen: Canna (3/3) 5', 58', 62'; Drop: Canna (1/1) 42'

Referee: Marius van der Westhuizen (South Africa)

FB	15	Giorgi Aptsiauri
RW	14	Muraz Giorgadze	(yellow card) 61' to 71'
OC	13	Giorgi Talakhadze		(substituted off) 54'
IC	12	Tamaz Mchedlidze
LW	11	Alexandre Khutsishvili
FH	10	Lasha Malaghuradze		(substituted off) 13'
SH	9	Vazha Khutsishvili		(substituted off) 58'
N8	8	Beka Bitsadze
OF	7	Beka Gorgadze
BF	6	Saba Shubitidze		(substituted off) 31'
RL	5	Giorgi Chkhaidze
LL	4	Levan Datunashvili (c)		(substituted off) 56'
TP	3	Irakli Mirtskhulava		(substituted off) 52'
HK	2	Simon Maisuradze		(substituted off) 52'
LP	1	Anton Peikrishvili		(substituted off) 52'
Replacements:
PR	16	Jaba Bregvadze		(substituted on) 52'
HK	17	Archil Bezhiashvili		(substituted on) 52'
PR	18	Nikoloz Khatiashvili		(substituted on) 52'
LK	19	Konstantin Mikautadze		(substituted on) 56'
FL	20	Otar Giorgadze		(substituted on) 31'
SH	21	Giorgi Begadze		(substituted on) 58'
WG	22	Giorgi Pruidze		(substituted on) 13'
FB	23	Beka Tsiklauri		(substituted on) 54'
Coach:
(New Zealand) Milton Haig

FB	15	Alberto Chiesa (c)
RW	14	Filippo Guarducci
OC	13	Giovanni Benvenuti
IC	12	Roberto Quartaroli
LW	11	Gabriele Di Giulio
FH	10	Carlo Canna
SH	9	Simone Marinaro	(substituted off) 78'
N8	8	Maxime Mbanda
OF	7	Emiliano Caffini
BF	6	Sebastian Negri
RL	5	Filippo Gerosa
LL	4	Federico Ruzza	(substituted off) 77'
TP	3	Giuseppe Di Stefano	(substituted off) 72'
HK	2	Oliviero Fabiani	(substituted off) 51'
LP	1	Federico Zani	(substituted off) 51'
Replacements:
HK	16	Luca Bigi	(substituted on) 72'
PR	17	Laert Naka	(substituted on) 51'
PR	18	Pietro Ceccarelli	(substituted on) 51'
FL	19	Alessio Zdrilich
FL	20	Mirko Amenta	(substituted on) 77'
SH	21	Simone Parisotto	(substituted on) 78'
FB	22	Christian Becerra
LK	23	Matteo Corazzi
Coach:
(Italy) Umberto Casellato

=== Matchday 3 ===
21 June 2015
17:00 GET (UTC+4)

Uruguay	13–23	Emerging Italy
Try: Arboleya 72' c Con: Ormaechea (1/1) 73'; Pen: Ormaechea (1/2) 30'; Drop: Durán (1/1) 8'	Stats	Try: Fabiani 26' c Di Giulio 39' c Con: Canna (2/2) 27', 40'; Pen: Canna (2/2) 12', 75'; Drop: Canna (1/1) 77'

Referee: Marius van der Westhuizen (South Africa)

FB	15	Gastón Mieres
RW	14	Leandro Leivas
OC	13	Joaquín Prada
IC	12	Alberto Román		(substituted off) 78'
LW	11	Santiago Gibernau
FH	10	Alejo Durán
SH	9	Agustín Ormaechea		(substituted off) 78'
N8	8	Alejandro Nieto		(substituted off) 78'
OF	7	Matías Beer
BF	6	Juan Manuel Gaminara	(yellow card) 18' to 28'
RL	5	Jorge Zerbino
LL	4	Santiago Vilaseca (c)		(substituted off) 52'
TP	3	Carlos Arboleya
HK	2	Nicolás Klappenbach		(substituted off) 51'
LP	1	Alejo Corral		(substituted off) 40'
Replacements:
PR	16	Mario Sagario		(substituted on) 51'
PR	17	Mateo Sanguinetti	(yellow card) 59' to 69'	(substituted on) 40'
FL	18	Agustín Alonso
LK	19	Franco Lamanna		(substituted on) 52'
FL	20	Diego Magno
FL	21	Fernando Bascou		(substituted on) 78'
FH	22	Manuel Blengio		(substituted on) 78'
CE	23	Andrés Vilaseca		(substituted on) 78'
Coach:
(Uruguay) Pablo Lemoine

FB	15	Alberto Chiesa (c)
RW	14	Filippo Guarducci
OC	13	Giovanni Benvenuti
IC	12	Roberto Quartaroli
LW	11	Gabriele Di Giulio
FH	10	Carlo Canna
SH	9	Simone Marinaro		(substituted off) 78'
N8	8	Maxime Mbanda		(substituted off) 44'
OF	7	Emiliano Caffini
BF	6	Sebastian Negri
RL	5	Alessio Zdrilich		(substituted off) 45'
LL	4	Federico Ruzza
TP	3	Pietro Ceccarelli		(substituted off) 59'
HK	2	Oliviero Fabiani	(yellow card) 64' to 74'
LP	1	Federico Zani		(substituted off) 53'
Replacements:
HK	16	Luca Bigi
PR	17	Laert Naka		(substituted on) 53'
PR	18	Giuseppe Di Stefano		(substituted on) 59'
LK	19	Filippo Gerosa		(substituted on) 45'
FL	20	Matteo Corazzi
SH	21	Simone Parisotto
FB	22	Christian Becerra
N8	23	Mirko Amenta		(substituted on) 44'
Coach:
(Italy) Umberto Casellato

21 June 2015
19:00 GET (UTC+4)

Georgia	12–45	Emerging Ireland
Try: Lomidze 6' m Penalty try 55' c Con: Tsiklauri (1/2) 55'; Drop: Tsiklauri (0/1)	Report	Try: Penalty try 31' c Healy (2) 45' c, 66' c Masterson 49' c Conway 72' c Bealham 74' c Con: Hanrahan (6/6) 32', 45', 50', 67', 73', 75'; Pen: Hanrahan (1/2) 18'

Attendance: 2,200
Referee: Mathieu Raynal (France)

FB	15	Beka Tsiklauri
RW	14	Alexandre Khutsishvili	(yellow card) 47' to 57'
OC	13	Revaz Gigauri
IC	12	Tamaz Mtchedlidze
LW	11	Giorgi Pruidze		(substituted off) 59'
FH	10	Mamuka Ninidze
SH	9	Giorgi Begadze		(substituted off) 64'
N8	8	Lasha Lomidze		(substituted off) 35'
OF	7	Giorgi Chkhaidze
BF	6	Beka Bitsadze
RL	5	Konstantin Mikautadze
LL	4	Levan Datunashvili (c)		(substituted off) 11'
TP	3	Anton Peikrishvili		(substituted off) 48'
HK	2	Simon Maisuradze		(substituted off) 48'
LP	1	Zurab Zhvania		(substituted off) 73'
Replacements:
PR	16	Jaba Bregvadze		(substituted on) 48'
HK	17	Giorgi Tetrashvili		(substituted on) 73'
PR	18	Irakli Mirtskhulava		(substituted on) 48'
LK	19	Otar Giorgadze		(substituted on) 11'
FL	20	Saba Shubitidze		(substituted on) 35'
SH	21	Vazha Khutsishvili		(substituted on) 64'
FH	22	Irakli Svanidze		(substituted on) 59'
WG	23	Giorgi Aptsiauri
Coach:
(New Zealand) Milton Haig

FB	15	Tiernan O'Halloran
RW	14	Andrew Conway
OC	13	Stuart McCloskey
IC	12	Noel Reid	(substituted off) 59'
LW	11	Matt Healy
FH	10	JJ Hanrahan
SH	9	Luke McGrath
N8	8	Jack Conan
OF	7	Dan Leavy
BF	6	Eoghan Masterson
RL	5	Billy Holland (c)	(substituted off) 7'
LL	4	Ben Marshall
TP	3	Stephen Archer	(substituted off) 73'
HK	2	Rob Herring	(substituted off) 73'
LP	1	James Cronin
Replacements:
PR	16	Dave Heffernan	(substituted on) 73'
HK	17	Denis Buckley
PR	18	Finlay Bealham	(substituted on) 73'
LK	19	Andrew Browne	(substituted on) 7'
FL	20	Frankie Taggart
SH	21	John Cooney
CE	22	Eoin Griffin	(substituted on) 59'
FB	23	Peter Nelson
Coach:
(Ireland) Allen Clarke

== See also ==
- 2015 World Rugby Nations Cup
- 2015 World Rugby Pacific Nations Cup
