= 2010 IRB Junior World Championship =

Tournament details
- Host: Argentina
- Date: 5 June 2010– 21 June 2010
- Teams: 12

Final positions
- Champions: New Zealand
- Runner-up: Australia
- Third place: South Africa

Tournament statistics
- Matches played: 30
- Top scorer(s): Tyler Bleyendaal (NZL)
- Most tries: Julian Savea (NZL)

The 2010 IRB Junior World Championship was the third annual international rugby union competition for Under 20 national teams, this competition replaced the now defunct under 19 and under 21 world championships. The event was organised by rugby's governing body, the International Rugby Board (IRB). The competition was contested by 12 men's junior national teams and was held in June 2010 and hosted by Argentina. The competition was won by New Zealand.

== Venues ==
City	Ground	Capacity
Santa Fe	Estadio Brigadier General Estanislao López	46,000
Paraná	Estudiantes de Paraná	16,740
Rosario	Estadio Marcelo Bielsa	42,000

== Pool stage ==
=== Pool A ===
Team	Pld	W	D	L	TF	PF	PA	+/-	BP	Pts
New Zealand	3	3	0	0	22	164	28	+136	3	15
Wales	3	2	0	1	5	63	59	+4	0	8
Fiji	3	1	0	2	3	29	87	−58	0	4
Samoa	3	0	0	3	3	32	114	−82	1	1

5 June
2:00pm

Fiji	11 – 44	New Zealand
Nasiganiyavi 29' m	Report	Try: Robertson 16' c Allen 24' c Grice 46' c Polwart 80' c Marshall 89' c Con: Parker (3/3) 17', 25', 47'; Bleyendaal (2/2) 81', 90'; Pen: Parker (3) 2', 5', 57'

Estadio Brigadier General Estanislao López, Santa Fe
Referee: JP Doyle (England)

5 June
4:00pm

Wales	22 – 13	Samoa
Jarvis P 5 Jarvis P 15; Faletau (yellow card) 18'; Jarvis P 28; Jarvis P 42; Jarvis P 70; Beck T 73; Jarvis C 74	Report	Tualaulelei T 20; Sililoto T 40+1; Faleono P 47

C.A. Estudiantes, Paraná
Referee: Nathan Pearce (Australia)

9 June
3:00pm

Wales	31 – 3	Fiji
Jarvis P 8 Jarvis P 10; John T 12; Jarvis C 13; Jarvis P 19; Allen T 24; Jarvis P 46; Beck T 80+2; Shingler C 80+3	Report	Nalasekata (yellow card) 18'; Matavesi P 20; Ugavule (yellow card) 66'

C.A. Estudiantes, Paraná
Referee: John Lacey (Ireland)

9 June
4:00pm

New Zealand	77 – 7	Samoa
Bleyendaal (c) P 11; Bleyendaal (c) P 17; Thomson T 20; Thomson T 25; Bleyendaal (c) C 26; Veainu T 29; Bleyendaal (c) C 30; Savea T 32; Bleyendaal (c) T 36; Bleyendaal (c) C 37; Savea T 46; Bleyendaal (c) C 47; Savea T 50; Bleyendaal (c) C 51; Ngauamo T 63; Savea T 72; Parker C 73; Ngatai T 75; Parker C 76; Prattley T 80+5; Parker C 80+6	Report	Iopu (yellow card) 57'; Tyrell T 68; Faleono C 68

Estadio Brigadier General Estanislao López, Santa Fe
Referee: Pascal Gaüzère (France)

13 June
2:10pm

New Zealand	43 – 10	Wales
Bleyendaal (c) P 1 Kerr-Barlow T 7 Bleyendaal (c) C 8 Savea T 16; Bleyendaal (c) C 17; Savea T 26; Bleyendaal (c) C 27; Marshall T 35; Bleyendaal (c) C 36; Veainu T 67; Bleyendaal (c) C 68; Marshall T 70	Report	Jarvis P 18; Williams T 29; Jarvis C 30; Taylor (yellow card) 60'

Estadio Brigadier General Estanislao López, Santa Fe
Referee: Peter Allan (Scotland)

13 June
3:00pm

Samoa	12 – 15	Fiji
Faleono P 7 Faleono P 26; Faleono P 69; Faleono P 74	Report	Matavesi P 3 Maritino Nemani William Marcus (yellow card) 22'; Tanikorolevu T 49; Dawai T 79; Matavesi C 80; Nalasekata (yellow card) 80+4'

C.A. Estudiantes, Paraná
Referee: JP Doyle (England)

=== Pool B ===
Team	Pld	W	D	L	TF	PF	PA	+/-	BP	Pts
England	3	3	0	0	9	101	52	+49	1	13
France	3	2	0	1	5	65	62	+3	1	9
Argentina	3	1	0	2	8	69	100	−31	0	4
Ireland	3	0	0	3	5	64	85	−21	2	2

5 June
2:10pm

France	25 – 22	Ireland
Doussain P 19; Doussain P 25; Doussain P 40; Doussain P 40+2; Erbani T 73; Bosch C 74; Bosch P 75; Bosch P 80+5	Report	McKinney P 28; McKinney P 40+4; McKinney P 43; McKinney P 51; McKinney P 57; Zebo T 79; McKinney C 80

Estadio Marcelo Bielsa, Rosario
Referee: Jaco Peyper (South Africa)

5 June
4:10pm

Argentina	22 – 48	England
Moyano T 7 Muedra C 8 Coria T 25; Muedra C 26; Muedra T 40+1; Muedra P 42	Report	Martin P 5 Martin P 16; May T 28; Martin C 29; Martin P 35; May T 37; Martin C 38; Martin P 44; May T 57; Martin P 61; Rowan (c) T 74; Martin C 75; Wade T 80+3; Martin C 80+4

Estadio Marcelo Bielsa, Rosario
Referee: John Lacey (Ireland)

9 June
2:10pm

England	36 – 21	Ireland
Homer P 5 Homer P 10; Gibson T 18; Homer C 18; Homer P 24; Homer P 49; Burns T 64; Homer C 65; Homer P 71; Burns T 80+1; Homer C 80+2	Report	McKinney P 2 McKinney P 14; Conway T 40; McKinney P 52; Griffin T 80+4; Reid C 80+5

Estadio Marcelo Bielsa, Rosario
Referee: Garratt Williamson (New Zealand)

9 June
4:10pm

Argentina	23 – 31	France
Muedra DG 15; Baravalle T 24; Moyano T 39; De la Vega T 53; Mendez C 54; Hernestrosa P 60	Report	Bales T 3 Bosch C 3 Lamerat T 13; Bosch C 13; Lamerat T 17; Bosch C 18; Sousa T 27; Bosch C 28; Taofifenua (yellow card) 56'; Bosch P 72

Estadio Marcelo Bielsa, Rosario
Referee: JP Doyle (England)

13 June
2:10pm

England	17 – 9	France
Burns P 21; Burns P 52; Gibson T 56; Clegg DG 73; Burns P 79	Report	Doussain P 11; Doussain P 22; Lamerat (yellow card) 62'; Bosch P 75

Estadio Marcelo Bielsa, Rosario
Referee: Francisco Pastrana (Argentina)

13 June
4:10pm

Ireland	21 – 24	Argentina
McKinney P 10; Marshall T 15; McKinney C 16; McKinney P 24; Butler (yellow card) 36'; McKinney P 50; Doyle T 75	Report	Vila T 34; Mendez C 34; Mendez P 36; Muedra DG 40; De la Vega T 46; Mendez P 52; Mendez P 69

Estadio Marcelo Bielsa, Rosario
Referee: Pascal Gaüzère (France)

=== Pool C ===
Team	Pld	W	D	L	TF	PF	PA	+/-	BP	Pts
Australia	3	3	0	0	25	167	53	+114	3	15
South Africa	3	2	0	1	20	148	56	+92	4	12
Scotland	3	1	0	2	4	40	134	−94	0	4
Tonga	3	0	0	3	2	22	134	−112	0	0

5 June
2:00pm

Tonga	14 – 40	South Africa
Toloke P 7 Latu (yellow card) 48'; Toloke P 57; Toloke P 68; Moala T 76	Report	Lambie P 1 Lambie P 9 Lambie P 18; Mastriet T 22; Lambie C 23; Lambie P 30; Stander (c) T 40+1; Lambie C 40+1; Venter T 53; Lambie C 54; Lambie T 80+3; Lambie C 80+4

C.A. Estudiantes, Paraná
Referee: Peter Allan (Scotland)

5 June
4:00pm

Australia	58 – 13	Scotland
To'omua P 4 Morahan T 12; Coleman T 19; To'omua C 20; Toua T 24; To'omua C 25; Toua T 32; Schatz (c) T 40+3; To'omua C 40+4; Toua T 61; Alo-Emile (yellow card) 67'; Faingaa T 74; To'omua C 75; Jeloudev T 77; To'omua C 78; Jones T 80+2	Report	Weir P 15; Weir P 29; Fife T 65; Weir C 66

Estadio Brigadier General Estanislao López, Santa Fe
Referee: Pascal Gaüzère (France)

9 June
1:00pm

Australia	67 – 5	Tonga
McCaffrey T 4 White C 4 White T 8 White C 8 Sio T 35; Mitchell T 40+1; White C 40+1; Coleman T 42; White C 42; Battye T 46; Manu (yellow card) 54'; Robertson T 60; White T 64; Schatz T 73; Lance (c) T 78; To'omua C 78; White T 80+1; To'omua C 80+2	Report	Sakalia (yellow card) 31'; Latu T 48

C.A. Estudiantes, Paraná
Referee: Jaco Peyper (South Africa)

9 June
2:00pm

South Africa	73 – 0	Scotland
Mjekevu T 2 Lambie C 3 Kolisi T 9 Lambie C 10; Kolisi T 12; Lambie C 13; Van der Merwe T 21; Lambie C 22; Badenhorst T 28; Jantjies T 37; Lambie C 38; Lambie T 46; Lambie C 47; Sithole T 50; Lambie C 51; Sithole T 57; Lambie C 58; Jantjies T 64; Jantjies C 65; Okafor T 72	Report

Estadio Brigadier General Estanislao López, Santa Fe
Referee: Francisco Pastrana (Argentina)

13 June
1:00pm

Scotland	27 – 3	Tonga
Weir P 4 Kennedy T 13; Weir C 14; Weir P 33; Maltman T 54; Weir C 55; McInally (c) T 80+1; Weir C 80+2	Report	Soatame P 47; Pinomi (yellow card) 53'; Sekona (yellow card) 80+3'

C.A. Estudiantes, Paraná
Referee: Nathan Pearce (Australia)

13 June
4:10pm

South Africa	35 – 42	Australia
Lambie P 1 Mjekevu T 8 Lambie T 23; Van der Merwe T 40; Lambie C 40+1; Lambie P 42; Mjekevu T 54; Lambie C 55; Taute T 67	Report	Shipperley T 12; To'omua C 13; To'omua P 15; Coleman T 26; To'omua C 27; Shipperley T 33; To'omua C 34; Shipperley T 49; To'omua C 50; To'omua P 60; Quirk T 64; To'omua P 76

Estadio Brigadier General Estanislao López, Santa Fe
Referee: Garratt Williamson (New Zealand)

== Knockout stage ==
=== 9th place play-offs ===
9th Place Play-Off Semi-finals
1	Ireland	37
4	Samoa	10
3	Scotland	28
2	Tonga	8

9th Place Play-Off
Ireland	53
Scotland	23
11th Place Play-Off
Samoa	3
Tonga	23

==== Play-off semi finals ====
17 June
1:00pm

Ireland	37 – 10	Samoa
Reid P 1 Reid T 15; Annett (c) T 21; Reid C 22; Conway T 36; Boyle T 47; Reid C 48; Griffin T 75; Boyle T 77; Reid C 78	Report	Faleono P 5 Keresoma T 28; Maleilegaoi C 29; Sililoto (yellow card) 44'; Faleono (yellow card) 47'; Malo (yellow card) 73'

C.A. Estudiantes, Paraná
Referee: Jaco Peyper (South Africa)

17 June
3:15pm

Scotland	28 – 8	Tonga
Weir P 3 McInally (c) T 6 Weir C 7 Weir P 15; Weir P 40+3; Tait T 50; Weir C 51; Walker T 58	Report	Soatame P 9 Latu T 74

C.A. Estudiantes, Paraná
Referee: Francisco Pastrana (Argentina)

==== 11th place play-off ====
21 June
2:15pm

Samoa	3 – 23	Tonga
Maleilegaoi P 40+1	Report	Michael Toloke P 17; Michael Toloke P 26; Katoa T 31; Aho T 46; Piutau T 89; Soatame C 89; Tuku'afu (yellow card) 80+2'

C.A. Estudiantes, Paraná
Referee: John Lacey (Ireland)

==== 9th place play-off ====
21 June
12:00pm

Ireland	53 – 23	Scotland
Zebo P 7 Reid P 11; Conway T 12; Reid T 17; Reid C 17; Conway T 22; Reid C 22; Zebo T 46; Reid C 46; Annett (c) T 50; Reid C 50; Conway T 63; Reid C 63; Cooney T 70; Reid C 70	Report	Weir P 14; Weir P 20; Harley T 28; Weir C 28; Weir P 31; McInally (c) T 61; Weir C 61; Weir (yellow card) 80+9'; Fedorciow (yellow card) 80+10'

C.A. Estudiantes, Paraná
Referee: Garratt Williamson (New Zealand)

=== 5th place play-offs ===
5th Place Play-Off Semi-finals
1	Wales	19 (8)
4	Argentina	19 (9)
3	France	44
2	Fiji	9

5th Place Play-Off
Argentina	23
France	37
7th Place Play-Off
Wales	39
Fiji	15

==== Play-off semi finals ====
17 June
2:00pm

Wales	19 – 19 (8–9 a.p.)	Argentina
Shingler P 12; Shingler P 34; Shingler P 46; Downes T 60; Shingler C 61; Jarvis P 75	Report	Mendez P 8 Mendez P 44; Barone T 63; Mendez C 64; Muedra P 73; Muedra P 80+1

Estadio Brigadier General Estanislao López, Santa Fe
Referee: Peter Allan (Scotland)

17 June
4:15pm

France	44 – 9	Fiji
Bosch P 10; Geledan T 29; Bosch C 30; Bosch P 40+4; Erbani T 49; Bosch C 50; Bosch P 54; Lagain T 73; Bosch C 74; Erbani T 80+1; Bosch C 80+2; Bonneval T 80+5; Bosch C 80+6	Report	Matavesi DG 8 Matavesi P 12; Matavesi P 44

Estadio Brigadier General Estanislao López, Santa Fe
Referee: Nathan Pearce (Australia)

==== 7th place play-off ====
21 June
12:00pm

Wales	39 – 15	Fiji
Jarvis P 3 Jarvis P 15; Jarvis P 23; Jarvis P 40+1; Jarvis P 45; Jarvis P 62; Allen T 67; Jarvis C 68; Davies T 79; Jarvis C 80; Allen T 80+3; Shingler C 80+4	Report	Ratulevu T 1 Linde C 2 Linde P 13; Marcus T35

Estadio Brigadier General Estanislao López, Santa Fe
Referee: Jaco Peyper (South Africa)

==== 5th place play-off ====
21 June
2:15pm

Argentina	23 – 37	France
Mendez P 24; Mendez P 42; De la Vega T 62; Muedra C 63; Lopez T 69; De la Vega T 89+3	Report	Gimeno T 28; Taofifenua T 40+5; Doussain C 40+6; Gimeno T 48; Doussain C 49; Ivaldi (c) T 52; Doussain P 58; Bosch P 65; Dulin T 72; Bosch C 73

Estadio Brigadier General Estanislao López, Santa Fe
Referee: Peter Allan (Scotland)

=== Championship play-offs ===
Semi-finals
1	Australia	28
4	England	16
3	New Zealand	36
2	South Africa	7

Final
Australia	17
New Zealand	62
3rd Place Play-Off
England	22
South Africa	27

==== Championship semi finals ====
17 June
2:10pm

Australia	28 – 16	England
To'omua P 4 Aidan Toua T 15; To'omua C 16; Morahan T 31; To'omua C 32; To'omua P 39; To'omua P 67; Sitauti T 75	Report	Smith T 8 Martin P 22; Martin P 58; May T 79

Estadio Marcelo Bielsa, Rosario
Referee: Garratt Williamson (New Zealand)

17 June
4:30pm

New Zealand	36 – 7	South Africa
Savea T 5 Bleyendaal (c) P 18; Thomson T 23; Bleyendaal (c) C 24; Grice T 29; Bleyendaal (c) C 30; Bleyendaal (c) P 51; Bleyendaal (c) P 57; Bleyendaal (c) P 59; Savea T 70	Report	Du Preez T 40+2; Lambie C 40+3

Estadio Marcelo Bielsa, Rosario
Referee: John Lacey (Ireland)

==== 3rd place play-off ====
21 June
4:45pm

England	22 – 27	South Africa
Watson T 13; Burns C 14; Green (yellow card) 16'; Burns T 23; Burns C 23; Marler T 33; Clegg P 68	Report	Scheepers T 8 Lambie C 9 Van der Walt (yellow card) 16'; Sithole T 25; Lambie T 41; Sithole T 57; Lambie C 57; Lambie P 73

Estadio Marcelo Bielsa, Rosario
Referee: Francisco Pastrana (Argentina)

==== Final ====
21 June
7:10pm

Australia	17 – 62	New Zealand
To'omua P 5 Morahan T 54; To'omua C 55; Sitauti T 69; To'omua C 70	Report	Coltman T 1 Tom Marshall T 9 Bleyendaal (c) C 9 Bleyendaal (c) P 15; Veainu T 19; Bleyendaal (c) C 20; Bleyendaal (c) P 37; Bleyendaal (c) P 41; Polwart T 44; Bleyendaal (c) C 45; Bleyendaal (c) T 47; Bleyendaal (c) C 48; Bleyendaal (c) P 52; Bleyendaal (c) P 60; Coltman (yellow card) 62'; Veainu T 71; Parker C 72; Veainu T 76; Parker C 77

Estadio Marcelo Bielsa, Rosario
Referee: Pascal Gaüzère (France)

== Final standings ==
Pos	Team
1	New Zealand
2	Australia
3	South Africa
4	England
5	France
6	Argentina
7	Wales
8	Fiji
9	Ireland
10	Scotland
11	Tonga
12	Samoa

== Media coverage ==
IRB broadcasting rights:

- Argentina: ESPN+ (All matches)
- Australia: FOX (Australian matches plus semis and finals)
- Brazil: BandSports (12 matches)
- Canada: Setanta (12 matches)
- Cook Islands: Elijah Communications (12 matches)
- Fiji: Fiji TV (Fiji matches on delay plus 12 matches)
- Ireland: Setanta Ireland (12 matches)
- Israel: Ananey Communications (12 matches)
- New Zealand: Sky (12 matches)
- Niue: TV Niue (12 matches)
- Romania: DTH (12 matches)
- Samoa: SBC (12 matches)
- Solomon Islands: Solomon Islands National TV (12 matches)
- Tonga: Digicel (12 matches)
- United Kingdom: Sky (12 matches)
- Wales: S4C (Welsh matches plus semis and finals)
- Latin America: ESPN Sur (Host broadcaster)
- Middle East: Showtime (10 matches)
- Pan Asia: Eurosport (12 matches)
- Pan Europe: Eurosport (12 matches)
- Southern Africa: M-Net/SuperSport (12 matches)

== See also ==
- 2010 IRB Junior World Rugby Trophy
