= Hoeata =

Hoeata is a surname. Notable people with the surname include:

- Fin Hoeata (born 1996), New Zealand rugby union player
- Jarrad Hoeata (born 1983), New Zealand rugby union player
- Riki Hoeata (born 1988), New Zealand rugby union player
