= Rhys Williams =

Rhys or Reece Williams may refer to:

== Sportspeople ==
- R. H. Williams (rugby union) (1930–1993), Welsh rugby union player; full name Rhys Haydn Williams
- Rhys Williams (rugby union, born 1979), Welsh rugby union hooker
- Rhys Williams (rugby union, born 1980), Welsh rugby union full-back and wing
- Rhys Williams (hurdler) (born 1984), Welsh athlete
- Reece Williams (born 1985), Australian rugby player
- Reece Williams (cricketer) (born 1988), South African cricketer
- Rhys Williams (rugby union, born 1988), Welsh rugby union centre
- Rhys Williams (soccer, born 1988), Australian professional association football player
- Rhys Williams (rugby league) (born 1989), Welsh rugby league footballer
- Rhys Williams (rugby union, born 1990), Welsh rugby union hooker
- Rhys Williams (soccer, born 1995), American soccer player
- Rhys Williams (footballer, born 2001), English footballer

== Others ==
- Rhys Williams (actor) (1897–1969), Welsh actor
- Rhys Williams (Australian politician), Australian politician
- Rhys Rhys-Williams (1865–1955), British Liberal MP
- Albert Rhys Williams (1883–1962), Welsh-American political activist
- Rhys H. Williams (sociologist) (born 1957), professor of sociology

== Characters ==
- Rhys Williams (Torchwood), portrayed in British science fiction series Torchwood
- Rhys Williams, a primary character in the 1977 novel Bloodline, by Sidney Sheldon
- Reese Williams and Bianca Montgomery, lesbian couple portrayed on American drama All My Children
- Reese Williams, an associate of Moon Knight in Marvel Comics

== See also ==
- Williams (surname)
