= Giuseppe Di Stefano (rugby union) =

- Born: 18 March 1989 (age 37) Udine italy
- Height: 1.90 m (6 ft 3 in)
- Weight: 130 kg (287 lb; 20 st 7 lb)

Rugby union career
- Position: Prop
- Current team: Fiamme Oro
Youth career
- Wasps Stabia
Senior career
Years	Team	Apps	(Points)
2009−2012	Wasps Stabia		
2012−2018	Fiamme Oro	91	(10)
2015	→Zebre	1	(0)
2017	→Benetton	1	(0)
2018−2020	Benetton	5	(0)
2019−2020	→Fiamme Oro	4	(0)
2020−2021	Fiamme Oro	3	(0)
- Correct as of 16 May 2020
International career
Years	Team	Apps	(Points)
2015−2016	Emerging Italy	6	(0)
- Correct as of 16 May 2020

Giuseppe Di Stefano (Udine, 18 March 1989) is an Italian rugby union player. His usual position is as a Prop and he currently plays for Fiamme Oro in Top12.

In 2015–16 Pro12 season he was named as Additional Player for Zebre and from 2017 to 2020 he played for Benetton

In 2015 and 2016, Di Stefano was named in the Emerging Italy squad for the Tbilisi Cup and Nations Cup.
