= Guarducci =

Guarducci is an Italian surname. Notable people with the surname include the following:

- Filippo Guarducci (born 1993), Italian rugby union player
- Ivan Guarducci (born 1941), Italian physician and politician
- Marcello Guarducci (born 1956), Italian swimmer
- Margherita Guarducci (1902–1999), Italian archaeologist and epigraphist
- Tommaso Guarducci (c.1720–1803), Italian castrato singer
