= Talakhadze =

Talakhadze (Georgian: ტალახაძე) is a Georgian surname. Notable people with the surname include:

- Giorgi Talakhadze (born 1994), Georgian rugby union player
- Lasha Talakhadze (born 1993), Georgian weightlifter
