= Denis Buckley =

Irish rugby union player (born 1990)

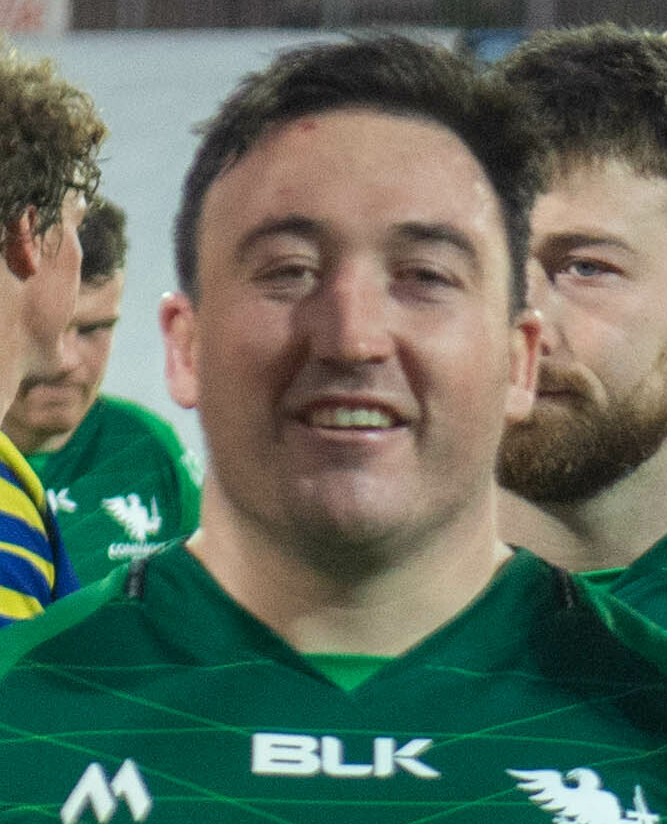
- Buckley in 2023
- Born: 9 August 1990 (age 36) County Roscommon, Ireland
- Height: 1.77 m (5 ft 10 in)
- Weight: 110 kg (17 st 5 lb)
- School: Blackrock College
- University: NUI Galway

Rugby union career
- Position: Prop
- Current team: Connacht
Amateur team(s)
Years	Team	Apps	(Points)
- Creggs RFC
Senior career
Years	Team	Apps	(Points)
2011–	Connacht	244	(35)
- Correct as of 28 February 2026
International career
Years	Team	Apps	(Points)
2010	Ireland U20	3	(0)
2015	Emerging Ireland	2	(0)
2018	Barbarians F.C.	1	(0)
- Correct as of 6 June 2021

Denis Buckley (born 9 August 1990) is a rugby union player from Ireland. He predominantly plays as a loosehead prop. Buckley currently plays for Irish provincial team Connacht in the Pro14. He plays his club rugby for Buccaneers.

Buckley has represented Ireland internationally at under-age level, and played for the Emerging Ireland side at the 2015 Tbilisi Cup. However, he has yet to represent Ireland at full international level.

== Early life ==
Raised in County Roscommon, Buckley first played rugby with local club Creggs RFC, he went on to play two seasons in the Ulster Bank League with Corinthians after joining the Connacht academy from Blackrock, later moving to Athlone-based team Buccaneers. Buckley was a student at Blackrock College. He has also studied at NUI Galway. Buckley joined the Connacht academy in 2009.

== Career ==
=== Connacht ===
Buckley became part of Connacht's academy ahead of the 2009–10 season. In September 2011, while in his third year at the academy, Buckley made his first appearance for the team. He came on as a replacement in a 2011–12 Pro12 match against Benetton Treviso. His first European appearance came against Toulouse in the 2011–12 Heineken Cup on 14 January 2012, also as a replacement. Buckley made his first start on 24 February that year in a Pro 12 match with Edinburgh. In total, his first season saw him make eight Pro 12 appearances and feature in two Heineken Cup games for the province.

Buckley became part of Connacht's senior squad the following season and played more regularly for the team, starting seven matches in the 2012–13 Pro12 and making 15 appearances in the competition overall. He also featured in five of the team's six matches in the 2012–13 Heineken Cup, starting in the game away against Zebre, and in both ties with Harlequins. Buckley signed a new contract in November 2012 to keep him with the province until 2015.

Buckley suffered a slow start to the following season, with injuries meaning he did not make his first appearance until 29 November 2013 when he was a replacement against Edinburgh in the 2013–14 Pro12. His next game came in that season's Heineken Cup, where he came on from the bench in a famous victory over four time European champions Toulouse in France. He appeared in four of Connacht's pool games in the Cup, being a replacement on each occasion. In February 2014, Connacht's first choice loosehead prop, Brett Wilkinson, suffered a neck injury against Saracens, which ultimately forced him to retire. This saw Buckley play more frequently for the province, starting all but two of Connacht's remaining matches and featuring as a replacement in the others. Buckley made a total of 14 appearances in the 2013–14 Pro12, six of these coming as a replacement.

Buckley earned his 200th cap for Connacht in a 20–12 loss to Benetton on 29 May 2021 during the Pro14 Rainbow Cup.

=== International ===
==== Ireland ====
Buckley has also been involved with Ireland at under-age international level. He was part of the Irish set up at school's and under-18 level. Although he was part of Allen Clarke's Ireland under-20 squads for both the Under-20 Six Nations and Junior World Cup in 2010, he never made an appearance for the side. At senior level, Buckley was selected for the Emerging Ireland squad to participate in the 2015 Tbilisi Cup, again coached by Clarke. He played in two of the team's three games as they won the tournament for the first time.

==== Barbarians ====
In May 2018, Buckley was called up for international invitational side the Barbarians, coached by his former Connacht boss Pat Lam. He was named to start against England alongside his Connacht teammates Niyi Adeolokun and Ultan Dillane.

== Honours ==
Individual

- Pro12 Dream Team (2): 2014–15, 2015–16

Connacht

- Pro14 Championship (1): 2015–16
