= Federico Ruzza =

Italy international rugby union player

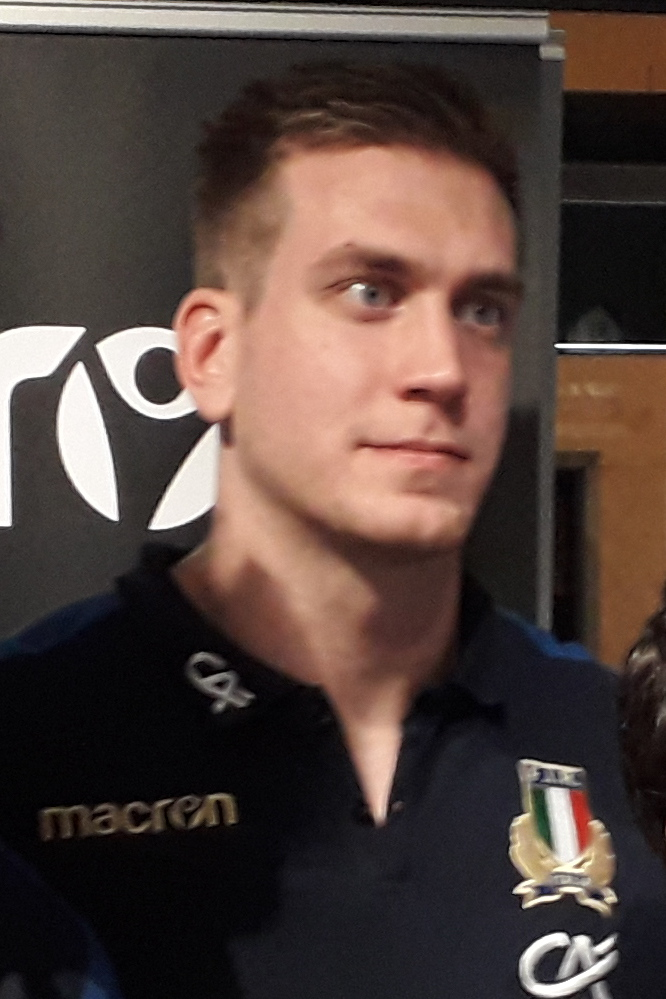
- Ruzza during a Six Nations event, March 2018
- Born: 4 August 1994 (age 32) Padua, Italy
- Height: 198 cm (6 ft 6 in)
- Weight: 113 kg (249 lb; 17 st 11 lb)

Rugby union career
- Position: Lock
- Current team: Benetton
Senior career
Years	Team	Apps	(Points)
2014–2015	Viadana	17	(20)
2015	→Zebre Parma	2	(0)
2015–2017	Zebre Parma	44	(35)
2017−	Benetton	146	(120)
- Correct as of 29 Aug 2026
International career
Years	Team	Apps	(Points)
2014	Italy U20	9	(0)
2015	Emerging Italy	3	(0)
2017–	Italy	74	(0)
- Correct as of 29 Aug 2026
National sevens team
Years	Team		Comps
2014	Italy		1
- Correct as of 19 November 2022

Federico Ruzza (born 4 August 1994) is an Italian professional rugby union player who primarily plays lock for Benetton of the United Rugby Championship.

== Professional career ==
Under contract with Viadana, for 2014–15 Pro12 season, Ruzza named as Permit Player for Zebre in Pro 14 and he played for Zebre from 2015 to 2017.

In 2014, Ruzza was named in the Italy Under 20 and Italy Sevens squads. In 2015 he was also named in the Emerging Italy squad for the 2015 World Rugby Tbilisi Cup. Ruzza was part of the Italian squad for the 2017 Six Nations Championship having made his test debut against Scotland during the 2017 Six Nations Championship. On 18 August 2019, he was named in the final 31-man squad for the 2019 Rugby World Cup.

On 22 August 2023, he was named in the Italy's 33-man squad for the 2023 Rugby World Cup.
