= Ben Marshall (rugby union) =

Irish rugby union player

- Born: 8 June 1990 (age 36) Dublin, Ireland
- Height: 1.96 m (6 ft 5 in)
- Weight: 118 kg (18 st 8 lb)
- School: St. Andrew's College
- University: University College Dublin

Rugby union career
- Position(s): Lock, Flanker
Amateur team(s)
Years	Team	Apps	(Points)
–2011	UCD		
2011–2017	Old Belvedere		
Provincial / State sides
Years	Team	Apps	(Points)
2010–2015	Leinster	20	(10)
2015–2017	Connacht	5	(5)
- Correct as of 31 January 2017
International career
Years	Team	Apps	(Points)
2008	Ireland U18	3	(0)
2010	Ireland U20	10	(5)
2015	Emerging Ireland	3	(5)
- Correct as of 27 May 2015

Ben Marshall (born 8 June 1990) is a retired rugby union player from Ireland. He primarily played as a lock or in the back row. Marshall played for Irish provincial sides Leinster and Connacht in the Pro12, but was forced to retire in 2017 due to a concussion.

== Early life ==
Born in Dublin, Marshall attended St. Andrew's College in the city, playing rugby for the school. He played with UCD, and Old Belvedere while part of the Leinster academy.

== Career ==
=== Leinster ===
Marshall came through the youth system of his native province, Leinster. During his time in the team's academy he featured for the second tier side, Leinster A against other provincial sides and in the British and Irish Cup. Marshall made his first senior appearance for the province as a replacement against Ulster in the 2010–11 Celtic League, but did not feature again during the season.

Marshall did not feature for the senior squad during the 2011–12 season, but made his first senior start for Leinster early in the 2012–13 Pro12 against Newport Gwent Dragons, scoring a try. Marshall made a total of seven appearances in the league for Leinster during the course of the season, with five of these coming as starts, as the province won their third Pro12 title. He also played for Leinster A in the 2012–13 British and Irish Cup, but missed the final against Newcastle Falcons after being forced off 23 minutes into the semi-final against Munster A.

In the following season, Marshall did not make any senior starts, though he did make two appearances from the bench in the 2013–14 Pro12. Marshall also played in the 2013–14 British and Irish Cup, and was able to start the final against Leeds Carnegie. He suffered an early injury however, and was forced off after just seven minutes in Leinster A's 44–17 victory.

In the 2014–15 Pro12, Marshall played his highest number of league games for Leinster, making a total of nine appearances, all but two of these coming as a replacement. He also scored his second try for the senior side against Edinburgh. On 19 April 2015 Marshall made his European debut for Leinster, coming off the bench against Toulon in the 2014–15 Rugby Champions Cup semi-final. Marshall left Leinster at the end of the 2014–15 season, having made 20 first team appearances.

=== Connacht ===
In May 2015, it was announced that Marshall would be moving to Irish provincial rivals Connacht ahead of the 2015–16 season. Marshall made his debut for the team on the opening day of the season, coming off the bench against Newport Gwent Dragons. He went on to make four more appearances for Connacht, with his final appearance coming against Ospreys. In 2017 Marshall announced his retirement from the game owing to a concussion injury.

=== International ===
Marshall has represented Ireland at under-age international level. He made three appearances for the Ireland Under-18 schools team, before progressing to the Irish Under-20 team. Marshall played for Ireland in the Under 20s Six Nations and was part of the Under-20 team's squad for the 2010 Junior World Championship in Argentina.

In May 2015, Marshall was named in the Emerging Ireland squad for the 2015 Tbilisi Cup. Ahead of the tournament, Marshall was part of an Ireland XV that took on the Barbarians in Thomond Park. He featured as a replacement for Dan Tuohy, but was on the losing side as Ireland were beaten 22–21. Marshall started the opening game of the Tbilisi against Emerging Italy, came off the bench in the following match with Uruguay and started the final game against hosts Georgia as Ireland won the tournament for the first time.
