= Craft Smoothie =

NZ delivery service

- Type: Private
- Industry: Meal kit E-commerce; Retail
- Founded: 2016
- Founders: Riki Hoeata
- Headquarters: New Zealand
- Areas served: New Zealand Wide; Auckland; Wellington; Christchurch; Hamilton; Tauranga; Napier-Hastings; Dunedin; Queenstown; Wānaka; Palmerston North; Nelson; Blenheim; Rotorua; Taupō; New Plymouth; Whangārei; Invercargill; Timaru; Whanganui; Gisborne

Craft Smoothie is a smoothie box delivery service that delivers pre-portioned smoothie ingredients and recipes weekly to subscribers in New Zealand.

== History ==
Craft Smoothie was started by former New Zealand Rugby player, Riki Hoeata, following a concussion injury which cut short his rugby playing career. The first smoothie boxes were delivered in 2016, and in October 2017, Craft Smoothie was named a finalist in The David Awards in the categories of Most Outstanding Fledgling Business and Most Outstanding Triumph Over Adversity and was the winner of the Solo Meo Award for 2017.

== Products ==
Each smoothie kit comes with pre-portioned ingredients and instructions to make superfood smoothies at home. The recipes change each week depending on the season and include fresh fruit and vegetables, and organic nuts, seeds and superfoods.

== Awards ==
- The David Awards – Solo Meo Award (2017)
