= Oliviero Fabiani =

Italy international rugby union player

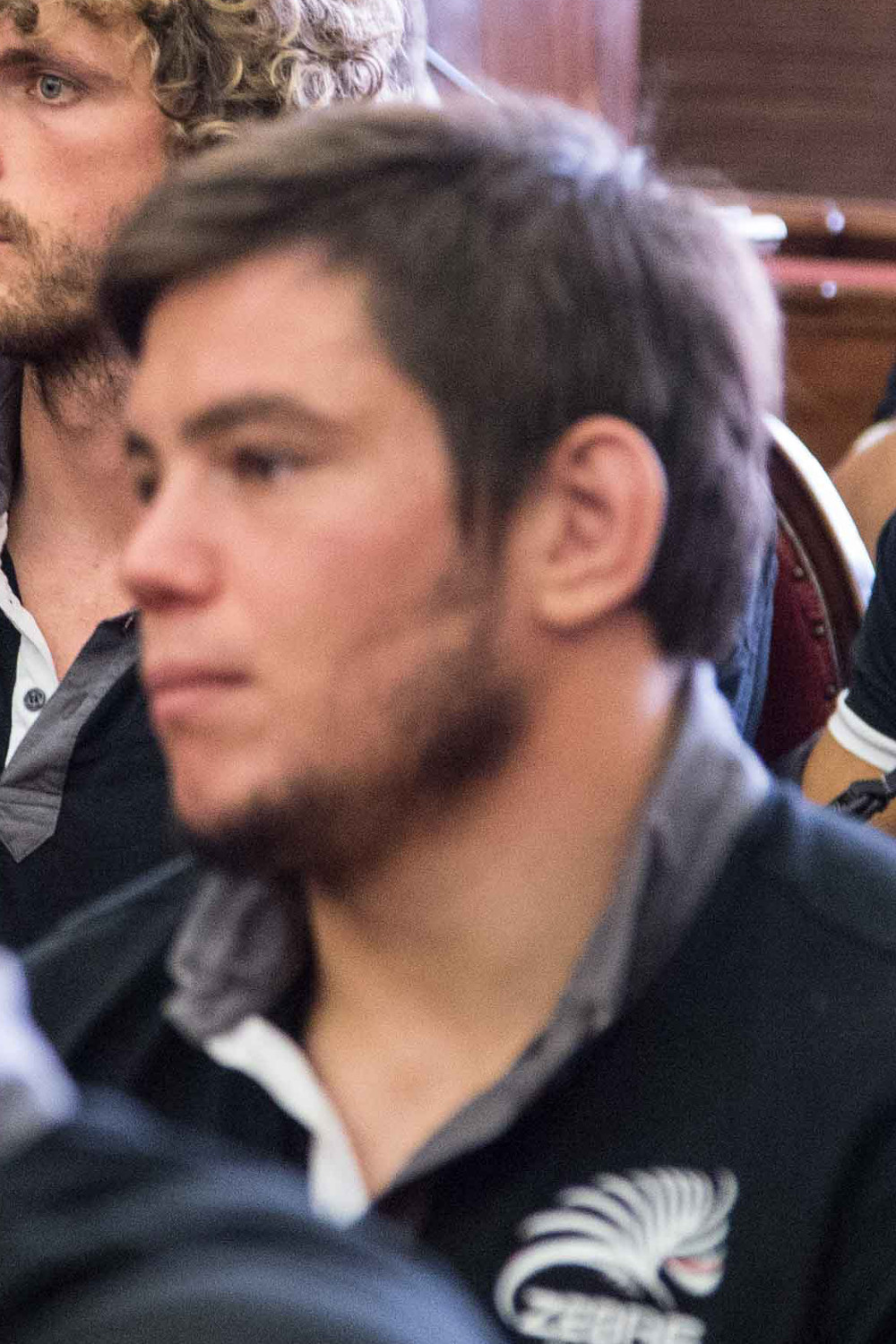
- Fabiani in 2014
- Born: 13 July 1990 (age 36) Rome
- Height: 1.80 m (5 ft 11 in)
- Weight: 98 kg (15 st 6 lb; 216 lb)

Rugby union career
- Position: Hooker
Youth career
- 2000−07: Unione Sportiva Primavera Rugby
- 2007−10: Lazio
Senior career
Years	Team	Apps	(Points)
2010−2014	Lazio	69	(35)
2014−2022	Zebre	140	(35)
2022−2024	Colorno	28	(30)
- Correct as of 25 Feb 2022
International career
Years	Team	Apps	(Points)
2013−2014	Italy Sevens	17	(15)
2015	Emerging Italy	3	(5)
2016−2019	Italy	11	(0)
- Correct as of 13 Mar 2021
Coaching career
- Years: Team
- 2024–: Colorno (Assistant Coach)

Oliviero Fabiani (born 13 July 1990) was an Italian rugby union player. His usual position was as hooker. He represented Italy on 16 occasions.

== Professional career ==
In 2013 and 2014, Fabiani was named in the Italy Sevens squad to participate at the annual Sevens Grand Prix Series and in 2015, he was also named in the Emerging Italy squad for the 2015 World Rugby Tbilisi Cup.

On 18 August 2019, he was named in the final 31-man squad for the 2019 Rugby World Cup.

After the experience with Lazio, from 2014 to 2022, he played with Zebre. From 2022 to 2024, he currently played for Colorno in Top10.

== Coaching career ==
He has been assistant coach of Colorno since June 2024.
