= Ethan Adams =

- Born: 3 March 2007 (age 19) Kareedouw, Eastern Cape
- Height: 1.75 m (5 ft 9 in)
- Weight: 104 kg (16.4 st; 229 lb)
- School: Grey College

Rugby union career
- Position: Centre
Youth career
- 2024-2025: Cheetahs
Senior career
Years	Team	Apps	(Points)
2026-	Golden Lions	3	(10)
2026-	Lions	3	(0)
- Correct as of 26 October 2026
International career
Years	Team	Apps	(Points)
2024-2025	South Africa U18	5	(10)
2026-	South Africa U20s	3	(15)
- Correct as of 26 October 2026

Ethan Adams (born 3 March 2007) is a South African rugby union player who plays as a centre for the United Rugby Championship team the Lions and the South Africa national under-20 rugby union team. Adams was a highly promising schoolboy player while playing for Grey College, with some calling him the best ever schoolboy centre in South Africa.

== Early career ==
Adams was named the Global School Challenge player of the tournament in 2024, while only 17 years old. His performances for Grey College earned him selection for the SA schools team in 2024 and 2025.

Adams represented the Cheetahs at the 2024 Craven Week competition. In 2025 he was signed by the Lions.

== International career ==
In 2026 Adams was named in the South Africa U20s team to tour Georgia in 2 friendlies. He would make his debut at inside centre in the 35-0 win over Georgia U20s. In his first game in the 2026 U20 Rugby Championship, he would score 2 tries and win man of the match. This performance again attracted national attention, with SuperSport calling him "one of the best young talents in the world."
