= Finn McLeod =

New Zealand rugby union player

- Born: 18 December 2006 (age 19) Christchurch, New Zealand
- Height: 194 cm (6 ft 4 in)
- Weight: 107 kg (236 lb; 16 st 12 lb)
- School: Christchurch Boys' High School
- Notable relative: Alex Wyllie (grandfather)

Rugby union career
- Position: Flanker / Number 8
- Current team: Crusaders / Canterbury
Senior career
Years	Team	Apps	(Points)
2026–	Canterbury	4	(10)
2027–	Crusaders	0	(0)
- Correct as of 1 November 2026
International career
Years	Team	Apps	(Points)
2025–2026	New Zealand U20	13	(25)
- Correct as of 1 November 2026

Finn McLeod (born 18 December 2006) is an New Zealand rugby union player, who plays for the Crusaders. His preferred position is flanker or number 8.

== Early career ==
McLeod was born in Christchurch and attended Christchurch Boys' High School, where he earned selection for the NZ Schools side in 2024. He joined up with the Crusaders academy after school, being named in the Junior Crusaders side. In 2025, McLeod was called into the New Zealand U20, before again being named in the side in 2026. He is the grandson of former All Black Alex Wyllie.

== Professional career ==
McLeod was named in the Canterbury squad for the 2026 Hilux NPC. He was then named in the Crusaders squad for the 2027 Super Rugby Pacific season.
