= Matthew Jarvis (rugby union) =

- Born: Matthew Jarvis; 25 August 1990 (age 36) Neath, Wales
- Height: 1.93 m (6 ft 4 in)
- Weight: 98 kg (15.4 st)
- University: University of Glamorgan (now the University of South Wales)

Rugby union career
- Position(s): Fly-half, Fullback
- Current team: Pontypool
Senior career
Years	Team	Apps	(Points)
2011-2013	Connacht	24	(45)
2013-	Nottingham	0	(0)
- Correct as of 5 May 2013
International career
Years	Team	Apps	(Points)
2010	Wales U20		
- Correct as of 27 June 2010

Mathew Jarvis (born 25 August 1990) is a rugby union player for Connacht Rugby. His favoured position is out-half. Jarvis signed for Connacht from the Welsh Rugby Union team the Ospreys.

== Honours ==
Jarvis has played for the Welsh U-18 and U-20 teams.
