= Manuel Blengio =

Uruguayan rugby union player

- Born: 28 April 1994 (age 32)
- Height: 1.83 m (6 ft 0 in)
- Weight: 84 kg (13 st 3 lb; 185 lb)

Rugby union career
- Position: Fly-half
International career
Years	Team	Apps	(Points)
2015-	Uruguay	17	(23)
- Correct as of 16 March 2018

Manuel Blengio (born 28 April 1994) is a Uruguayan rugby union player. He was named in Uruguay's squad for the 2015 Rugby World Cup.
