= Jake Frost =

New Zealand rugby union player

- Born: 24 February 2006 (age 20) New Zealand
- Height: 198 cm (6 ft 6 in)
- Weight: 116 kg (256 lb; 18 st 4 lb)
- School: Christchurch Boys' High School

Rugby union career
- Position: Lock
- Current team: Crusaders / Tasman
Senior career
Years	Team	Apps	(Points)
2026–	Tasman	7	(0)
2027–	Crusaders	0	(0)
- Correct as of 9 November 2026
International career
Years	Team	Apps	(Points)
2026	New Zealand U20	8	(10)
- Correct as of 9 November 2026

Jake Frost (born 24 February 2006) is a New Zealand rugby union player, who plays for the Crusaders. His preferred position is lock.

== Early career ==
Frost is from New Zealand and attended Christchurch Boys' High School. His school performances earned him selection for New Zealand U18s in 2024, and a place in the Crusaders academy, who he represented at U20 level in 2025. In 2026, he was named in the New Zealand U20 development side, before being named in the full squad later in the year.

== Professional career ==
Frost has represented Tasman in the National Provincial Championship since 2026, being named in their squad for the 2026 Hilux NPC competition. In October 2026, he was named in the Crusaders wider training group for the 2027 Super Rugby Pacific season.
