= Rhys Williams (rugby union, born 1990) =

- Born: Rhys Williams; 16 January 1990 (age 36) Pontypridd, Wales
- Height: 183 cm (6 ft 0 in)
- Weight: 107 kg (16 st 12 lb)

Rugby union career
- Position: Hooker
- Current team: Cardiff Blues
Senior career
Years	Team	Apps	(Points)
2010-	Cardiff Blues	31	(0)
- Correct as of 18:00, 14 November 2012 (UTC)

For people of the same name see Rhys Williams (disambiguation)

Rhys Williams (born 16 January 1990) is a Welsh rugby union player. A hooker, he plays club rugby for Cardiff Blues regional team having previously played for Pontypridd RFC.
