= Haki Wiseman =

New Zealand rugby union player

- Full name: Jack Wiseman
- Born: 17 December 2006 (age 19) Rotorua, New Zealand
- Height: 183 cm (6 ft 0 in)
- Weight: 93 kg (205 lb; 14 st 9 lb)
- School: New Plymouth Boys' High School

Rugby union career
- Position: Midfield
- Current team: Chiefs / Taranaki
Senior career
Years	Team	Apps	(Points)
2026–	Taranaki	6	(0)
2027–	Chiefs	0	(0)
- Correct as of 10 November 2026
International career
Years	Team	Apps	(Points)
2025–2026	New Zealand U20	14	(15)
- Correct as of 10 November 2026

Haki Wiseman (born 17 December 2006) is a New Zealand rugby union player, who plays for the Chiefs. His preferred position is midfield.

== Early career ==
Wiseman was born in Rotorua and attended New Plymouth Boys' High School. His school performances earned him selection for New Zealand Schools in 2024, and selection for the Chiefs academy who he represented at U18 level in 2024, and U20 level in 2025. Wiseman was named in the New Zealand U20 side in both 2025 and 2026.

== Professional career ==
Wiseman has represented Taranaki in the National Provincial Championship since 2026, being named in their squad for the 2026 Hilux NPC competition. In October 2026, he was named in the Chiefs wider training group for the 2027 Super Rugby Pacific season.
