= Roberto Quartaroli =

Italy international rugby union player

- Born: 29 March 1988 (age 38) L'Aquila
- Height: 6 ft 3 in (1.91 m)
- Weight: 202 lb (92 kg; 14.4 st)

Rugby union career
- Position: Wing
Senior career
Years	Team	Apps	(Points)
2006−2008	L'Aquila		
2008−2010	Crociati Parma	38	(30)
2010−2012	Aironi	19	(5)
2012−2014	Zebre	19	(0)
2014−2015	Viadana	13	(5)
2015−2020	Fiamme Oro	56	(60)
International career
Years	Team	Apps	(Points)
2008	Italy Under 20	5	(0)
2010−2016	Emerging Italy	8	(0)
2008−2012	Italy	4	(0)

Roberto Quartaroli (born 29 March 1988) is a retired Italian rugby union player, native of L'Aquila, he normally plays as a centre. He represented Italy on 4 occasions.

After playing for Italy Under 20 in 2008, from 210 to 2016, Quartaroli was named in the Emerging Italy squad. In January 2012 he was called up to the Italian team for the 2012 Six Nations Championship.
