= New Zealand national under-20 rugby union team =

New Zealand
- Union: New Zealand Rugby
- Nickname: Baby Blacks
- Coach(es): Jarrad Hoeata; Alex Robertson
- Top scorer: Trent Renata (59)
- Most tries: Zac Guildford and Tevita Li (8)
Team kit

First international
- New Zealand 48–9 Tonga (6 June 2008; Cardiff Arms Park, Cardiff)

Largest win
- New Zealand 92–0 Wales (14 June 2011; Rugby Rovigo Delta, Rovigo)

Largest defeat
- Australia 24–0 New Zealand (5 May 2019; Bond Sports Park, Gold Coast)

World Cup
- Appearances: 15 (First in 2008)
- Best result: Champions (2008, 2009, 2010, 2011, 2015, 2017)

The New Zealand national under-20 rugby union team, nicknamed the Baby Blacks, is the representative rugby union team from New Zealand. It replaced the two former age grade teams, the under-19s and the under-21s. Their first tournament was the 2008 IRB Junior World Championship, which they won after defeating England (38–3) in the final. They have gone on to also win the World Rugby Under 20 Championship in 2009, 2010, 2011, 2015 and 2017. The New Zealand under-20s have been nicknamed the "Baby Blacks" after the youthful All Blacks side which played in 1986.

== Overall ==
Summary of all matches played by the New Zealand Under-20s as of 18 July 2026 following the match against England in the 2026 World Rugby Junior World Championship.

| Opposition | Played | Won | Drawn | Lost | %Win |
|---|---|---|---|---|---|
| Argentina | 8 | 7 | 0 | 1 | 87.5% |
| Australia | 19 | 14 | 1 | 4 | 73.7% |
| England | 7 | 6 | 0 | 1 | 85.7% |
| Fiji | 7 | 7 | 0 | 0 | 100% |
| France | 8 | 4 | 0 | 4 | 50% |
| Georgia | 4 | 4 | 0 | 0 | 100% |
| Ireland | 10 | 9 | 0 | 1 | 90% |
| Italy | 4 | 4 | 0 | 0 | 100% |
| Japan | 5 | 5 | 0 | 0 | 100% |
| Samoa | 5 | 5 | 0 | 0 | 100% |
| Scotland | 5 | 5 | 0 | 0 | 100% |
| South Africa | 11 | 2 | 2 | 7 | 18.2% |
| Spain | 1 | 1 | 0 | 0 | 100% |
| Tonga | 2 | 2 | 0 | 0 | 100% |
| Uruguay | 1 | 1 | 0 | 0 | 100% |
| Wales | 11 | 9 | 0 | 2 | 81.8% |
| Total | 108 | 85 | 3 | 11 | 78.7% |

=== World Rugby U20 Championship record ===
| Year | Round | Position | Pld | W | D | L | PF | PA |
|---|---|---|---|---|---|---|---|---|
| 2008 | Champions | 1st | 5 | 5 | 0 | 0 | 242 | 28 |
| 2009 | Champions | 1st | 5 | 5 | 0 | 0 | 215 | 54 |
| 2010 | Champions | 1st | 5 | 5 | 0 | 0 | 262 | 52 |
| 2011 | Champions | 1st | 5 | 5 | 0 | 0 | 274 | 51 |
| 2012 | Runners-up | 2nd | 5 | 3 | 0 | 2 | 148 | 49 |
| 2013 | Semi-finals | 4th | 5 | 3 | 0 | 2 | 159 | 116 |
| 2014 | Semi-finals | 3rd | 5 | 3 | 0 | 2 | 196 | 107 |
| 2015 | Champions | 1st | 5 | 5 | 0 | 0 | 191 | 63 |
| 2016 | 5th place | 5th | 5 | 4 | 0 | 1 | 223 | 86 |
| 2017 | Champions | 1st | 5 | 5 | 0 | 0 | 282 | 92 |
| 2018 | Semi-finals | 4th | 5 | 3 | 0 | 2 | 173 | 84 |
| 2019 | 7th place | 7th | 5 | 3 | 0 | 2 | 161 | 96 |
| 2023 | 7th place | 7th | 5 | 3 | 0 | 2 | 188 | 150 |
| 2024 | Semi-finals | 3rd | 5 | 4 | 0 | 1 | 182 | 152 |
| 2025 | Runners-up | 2nd | 5 | 4 | 0 | 1 | 170 | 95 |
| 2026 | 3rd place | 3rd | 5 | 4 | 0 | 1 | 182 | 114 |
| Total | 16/16 | 6 titles | 80 | 64 | 0 | 16 | 3,248 | 1,389 |

=== Oceania Rugby U20 Championship record ===
| Year | Round | Position | Pld | W | D | L | PF | PA |
|---|---|---|---|---|---|---|---|---|
| 2015 | Champions | 1st | 3 | 3 | 0 | 0 | 157 | 43 |
| 2016 | Champions | 1st | 2 | 1 | 0 | 1 | 54 | 35 |
| 2017 | Champions | 1st | 3 | 3 | 0 | 0 | 186 | 32 |
| 2018 | Champions | 1st | 3 | 3 | 0 | 0 | 195 | 43 |
| 2019 | Runners-up | 2nd | 3 | 2 | 0 | 1 | 140 | 43 |
| 2022 | Champions | 1st | 3 | 3 | 0 | 0 | 175 | 26 |
| Total | 6/6 | 5 titles | 17 | 15 | 0 | 2 | 907 | 222 |

=== U20 Rugby Championship record ===
| Year | Round | Position | Pld | W | D | L | PF | PA |
|---|---|---|---|---|---|---|---|---|
| 2024 | Champions | 1st | 3 | 2 | 1 | 0 | 92 | 58 |
| 2025 | Champions | 1st | 3 | 2 | 1 | 0 | 152 | 95 |
| 2026 | Runners-Up | 2nd | 3 | 1 | 1 | 1 | 80 | 83 |
| Total | 3/3 | 2 titles | 9 | 5 | 3 | 1 | 324 | 236 |

== Players ==
=== Recent squads ===
==== 2026 ====
On 9 June 2026, a 30-player squad was announced for the 2026 World Rugby Junior World Championship in Georgia.

| Player | Position | Region/Province |
|---|---|---|
| Alani Fakava | Hooker | Hurricanes, Manawatu |
| Josh Findlay | Hooker | Crusaders, Canterbury |
| Xavier Leota | Hooker | Blues, Auckland |
| Alexander Hewitt | Prop | Hurricanes, Wellington |
| Dane Johnston | Prop | Chiefs, Taranaki |
| James Moore | Prop | Crusaders, Canterbury |
| Henry Stuart | Prop | Highlanders, Otago |
| Ethan Webber | Prop | Highlanders, Otago |
| Max Fale | Lock | Crusaders, Canterbury |
| John Falloon | Lock | Hurricanes, Wellington |
| Jake Frost | Lock | Crusaders, Canterbury |
| Kobe Brownlee | Loose forward | Crusaders, Tasman |
| Micah Fale | Loose forward | Chiefs, Waikato |
| Jake Hutchings | Loose forward | Blues, Auckland |
| Patrick Mauga | Loose forward | Hurricanes, Hawke's Bay |
| Bradley Tocker | Loose forward | Chiefs, Taranaki |
| Caleb Woodley | Loose forward | Blues, Auckland |
| Jackson Hughan | Halfback | Highlanders, Southland |
| Boston Krone | Halfback | Blues, Auckland |
| Charlie Sinton | Halfback | Chiefs, Bay of Plenty |
| Cohen Norrie | First five-eighth | Blues, Auckland |
| Mika Muliaina | First five-eighth | Highlanders, Southland |
| David Lewai | Midfield back | Chiefs, Waikato |
| Siale Pahulu | Midfield back | Blues, Auckland |
| Triumph Voice | Midfield back | Hurricanes, Hawke's Bay |
| Haki Wiseman | Midfield back | Chiefs, Taranaki |
| Lautasi Etuale | Outside back | Crusaders, Canterbury |
| Oliver Guerin | Outside back | Chiefs, Waikato |
| Kele Lasaqa | Outside back | Chiefs, Bay of Plenty |
| Logan Williams | Outside back | Crusaders, Canterbury |

Non-travelling reserves

Charlie Wallis, Luka Makata, Emori Balenaisa, Jericho Wharehinga, Nate Bodle, Zac Taulapapa, Alex Arnold, Logan Platt, Drew Berg-McLean, Charlie Sullivan, Jimmy Taylor, Angus Revell, JD Van der Westhuizen, Jay Reihana, Noah Rogers.

=== Award winners ===
The following New Zealand U20s players have been recognised at the World Rugby Awards since 2008:

World Rugby Junior Player of the Year
| Year | Nominees | Winners |
|---|---|---|
| 2008 | Luke Braid | Luke Braid |
| 2008 | Chris Smith | Luke Braid |
| 2009 | Aaron Cruden | Aaron Cruden |
| 2009 | Winston Stanley | Aaron Cruden |
| 2010 | Tyler Bleyendaal | Julian Savea |
| 2010 | Julian Savea | Julian Savea |
| 2011 | Sam Cane | — |
| 2011 | Luke Whitelock | — |
| 2013 | Ardie Savea | — |
| 2014 | Tevita Li | — |
| 2015 | Akira Ioane | — |
| 2015 | Tevita Li (2) | — |
| 2016 | Shaun Stevenson | — |
| 2017 | Tiaan Falcon | — |
| 2017 | Will Jordan | — |

== Coaches ==
Due to the U20 category only existing since the combining of the U19 and U21 age groups in 2007, the following table only includes coaches appointed since. In the inaugural tournament in 2008, Dave Rennie and Russell Hilton-Jones served as co-coaches in charge of the team. Craig Philpott is the longest serving coach. Jarrad Hoeata and Alex Robertson are the current co-head coaches.

Updated to: 19 July 2025

| Coach | Tenure | P | W | D | L | W% |
|---|---|---|---|---|---|---|
| Dave Rennie | 2008 | 5 | 5 | 0 | 0 | 100% |
| Russell Hilton-Jones | 2008 | 5 | 5 | 0 | 0 | 100% |
| Dave Rennie | 2009–2010 | 10 | 10 | 0 | 0 | 100% |
| Mark Anscombe | 2011 | 5 | 5 | 0 | 0 | 100% |
| Rob Penney | 2012 | 5 | 3 | 0 | 2 | 60% |
| Chris Boyd | 2013–2014 | 10 | 6 | 0 | 4 | 60% |
| Scott Robertson | 2015–2016 | 15 | 13 | 0 | 2 | 86.67% |
| (New Zealand) Craig Philpott | 2017–2019 | 24 | 19 | 0 | 5 | 79.17% |
| Tom Donnelly | 2022 | 3 | 3 | 0 | 0 | 100% |
| Clark Laidlaw | 2023 | 7 | 4 | 0 | 3 | 57.14% |
| Jono Gibbes | 2024 | 8 | 6 | 1 | 1 | 75% |
| Milton Haig | 2025 | 3 | 2 | 1 | 0 | 66.67% |
| Jarrad Hoeata | 2025– | 5 | 4 | 0 | 1 | 80% |
| Alex Robertson | 2025– | 5 | 4 | 0 | 1 | 80% |

== See also ==
- New Zealand national schoolboy rugby union team
- New Zealand national under-19 rugby union team
- New Zealand national under-21 rugby union team
- Junior All Blacks
