= Irakli Mirtskhulava =

- Born: 22 December 1988 (age 37) Kutaisi, Georgian SSR, Soviet Union
- Height: 1.84 m (6 ft 1/2 in)
- Weight: 119 kg (18 st 10 lb)

Rugby union career
- Position: Prop
Senior career
Years	Team	Apps	(Points)
2013-2016	Tarbes	27	(0)
2016-	Oyonnax Rugby	25	(5)
International career
Years	Team	Apps	(Points)
2016-	Georgia	14	(0)
- Correct as of 23 June 2018

Irakli Mirtskhulava is a Georgian rugby union player who plays as a prop for Oyonnax in the Top 14.
