= Max Fale =

New Zealand rugby union player

- Born: 10 November 2006 (age 20) New Zealand
- Height: 203 cm (6 ft 8 in)
- Weight: 122 kg (269 lb; 19 st 3 lb)
- School: St Thomas of Canterbury College

Rugby union career
- Position: Lock
- Current team: Crusaders / Canterbury
Senior career
Years	Team	Apps	(Points)
2026–	Canterbury	5	(0)
2027–	Crusaders	0	(0)
- Correct as of 9 November 2026
International career
Years	Team	Apps	(Points)
2026	New Zealand U20	7	(5)
- Correct as of 9 November 2026

Max Fale (born 10 November 2006) is a New Zealand rugby union player, who plays for the Crusaders. His preferred position is lock.

== Early career ==
Fale was born in New Zealand and attended St Thomas of Canterbury College. His school performances earned him selection for New Zealand U18s in 2024, and a place in the Crusaders academy, who he represented at U20 level in 2025. In 2026, he was named in the New Zealand U20 development side, before being named in the full squad later in the year.

== Professional career ==
Fale has represented Canterbury in the National Provincial Championship since 2026, being named as an additional player in their squad for the 2026 Hilux NPC competition. In October 2026, he was named in the Crusaders wider training group for the 2027 Super Rugby Pacific season.
