= Gabriele Di Giulio =

Italian rugby union player

- Born: 30 April 1994 (age 32) Frascati, Italy
- Height: 1.85 m (6 ft 1 in)
- Weight: 86 kg (13 st 8 lb; 190 lb)

Rugby union career
- Position: Wing
- Current team: Zebre
Youth career
- Frascati Rugby
Senior career
Years	Team	Apps	(Points)
2013−2014	F.I.R. Academy		
2014−2016	Calvisano	27	(45)
2015	→Zebre	2	(0)
2016−2022	Zebre	46	(30)
- Correct as of 2 Oct 2021
International career
Years	Team	Apps	(Points)
2014	Italy Under 20	7	(5)
2015−2016	Emerging Italy	5	(6)
- Correct as of 19 May 2020

Gabriele Di Giulio (Frascati, 30 April 1994) is a retired Italian rugby union player. His usual position was as a Wing and he currently plays for Zebre in Pro14.

Under contract with Calvisano, for 2015–16 Pro12 season, he named as Additional Player for Zebre. He played with Zebre from 2016 to 2022.

In 2014, Di Giulio was named in the Italy Under 20 squad and in 2015 and 2016 he was named in the Emerging Italy squad.
