= Finn Mackay (rugby union) =

Australian rugby union player

- Born: 4 June 2007 (age 19) Australia
- Height: 189 cm (6 ft 2 in)
- Weight: 84 kg (185 lb; 13 st 3 lb)
- School: St Laurence's College

Rugby union career
- Position: Fly-half
- Current team: Reds
Senior career
Years	Team	Apps	(Points)
2026–	Reds	1	(0)
- Correct as of 13 February 2026

Finn Mackay (born 4 June 2007) is an Australian rugby union player, who plays for the Reds in the Super Rugby. His preferred position is fly-half.

== Early career ==
Australian-born, Mackay started his career in Brisbane, playing junior rugby for South's Magpies, attending St Laurence's College. Before moving to Melbourne where he played for Brighton Grammar, then reattending St Laurence's College in Queensland A member of the Reds academy, he plays his club rugby for Souths. He represented Australia Schools in 2025.

== Professional career ==
Mackay debuted for Queensland against Saitama Wild Knights in October 2025. He was then named in the Reds squad for the 2026 Super Rugby Pacific season, having previously signed a two-year development contract in August 2025. He made his debut for the Reds in Round 1 of the season against the Waratahs.
