= Rhys Williams (rugby union, born 1988) =

Welsh rugby union player

- Born: Rhys Williams; 27 January 1988 (age 38) Swansea, Wales
- Height: 182 cm (6 ft 0 in)
- Weight: 111 kg (245 lb)

Rugby union career
- Position: Centre
- Current team: Carmarthen Quins
Senior career
Years	Team	Apps	(Points)
2007-10	Llandovery RFC	60	(85)
2013-	Carmarthen Quins	57	(96)
Provincial / State sides
Years	Team	Apps	(Points)
2014	Dragons	2	(0)
International career
Years	Team	Apps	(Points)
2005-06	Wales U18		
2006-07	Wales U19	6	(5)
2007	Wales U20	5	(0)

Rhys Williams (born 27 January 1988) is a Welsh rugby union player who played at centre for Llanelli RFC, Scarlets, Llandovery RFC, USON pro d2 France, Carmarthen Quins., Dragons, Swansea RFC, Ospreys, Bridgend RFC, and currently player coach for Bridgend Athletic RFC.
