= Wasps Stabia Rugby =

Italian rugby union club, based in Castellammare di Stabia

Coordinates: 40°42′22″N 14°29′40″E

- Full name: Wasps Stabia Rugby
- Union: Italian Rugby Federation
- Nickname: Wasps
- Founded: 2006; 20 years ago
- Location: Castellammare di Stabia, Italy
- Ground: Stadio Romeo Menti (Capacity: 12,000)
- President: (Italy) Gianandrea de Antonellis
- Coach: (Italy) Salvatore Lucia
- Captain: (Italy) Raffaele Sorrentino
- League: Serie C girone Campania
1st kit	2nd kit

Official website
- www.stabiarugby.it

The Wasps Stabia Rugby was a rugby union club in the town of Castellammare di Stabia, near Naples in Italy that play in Serie C, the fourth division of the national league.

== History ==
The club was founded in 2006 by Fabio D'Arco and Gianclaudio Romeo. During its life, the club took part in Seria C of the Italian championship. In 2012 won the Italian Regional Cup Under 18. From 2010 and 2012, it was led by the president Gianandrea de Antonellis.

== Links to other clubs ==
The supporters of Stabia have been quick to form links with other clubs, notably Wasps, a Premiership team in England.

== See also ==
- Italian Rugby Federation
