= Riki Hoeata =

New Zealand rugby player

Richard Hoeata
- Born: 15 January 1988 (age 38) Tauranga, New Zealand
- Height: 1.95 m (6 ft 5 in)
- Weight: 107 kg (236 lb)
- Notable relative: Jarrad Hoeata (brother)

Rugby union career
- Position(s): Lock, Flanker
Provincial / State sides
Years	Team	Apps	(Points)
2011–12	Tasman	14	(5)
2014–15	Taranaki	21	(0)
- Correct as of 23 October 2016

Riki Hoeata (born 15 January 1988) is a former New Zealand rugby union player.

He played in the lock (and occasionally flanker) position for Taranaki and Tasman. Aged only 21, Hoeata started his career with Taranaki after he was named for their 2009 pre-season campaign. After his 2010 opening season, the impression left on selectors was positive, leading to Hoeata moving south from the North Island to make his provincial debut for Tasman during the 2011 ITM Cup. He earned his first NPC start in Tasman's 9–19 loss to Northland in week one of the competition, he made a total of six appearances and crossed the line once. Hoeata returned to play for Taranaki in 2014 and 2015. He was part of Taranaki's NPC Premiership winning squad in 2014. He retired after the 2015 season, citing a concussion sustained during practice.

In 2016 he founded Craft Smoothie, a New Zealand-wide smoothie box delivery service. As of 2026 Hoeata says he has "moved on" from that business.
