= Cohen Norrie =

New Zealand rugby union player

- Born: 24 November 2006 (age 19) New Zealand
- Height: 174 cm (5 ft 9 in)
- Weight: 77 kg (170 lb; 12 st 2 lb)
- School: Sacred Heart College, Auckland

Rugby union career
- Position: First five-eighth / Fullback
- Current team: Blues / Auckland
Senior career
Years	Team	Apps	(Points)
2025–	Auckland	8	(15)
2027–	Blues	0	(0)
- Correct as of 11 November 2026
International career
Years	Team	Apps	(Points)
2026	New Zealand U20	8	(35)
- Correct as of 11 November 2026

Cohen Norrie (born 24 November 2006) is a New Zealand rugby union player, who plays for the Blues. His preferred position is first five-eighth or fullback.

== Early career ==
Norrie was born in New Zealand and attended Sacred Heart College, Auckland. His school performances earned him selection for the New Zealand Schools side in 2024, and selection for the Blues academy who he represented at U18 level in 2023, and U20 level in 2025. Norrie was named in the New Zealand U20 side in 2026.

== Professional career ==
Norrie has represented Auckland in the National Provincial Championship since 2025, being named in their squad for the 2026 Hilux NPC competition. In October 2026, he was named in the Blues wider training group for the 2027 Super Rugby Pacific season.
