= Caleb Woodley =

New Zealand rugby union player

- Born: 1 July 2006 (age 20) Auckland, New Zealand
- Height: 185 cm (6 ft 1 in)
- Weight: 106 kg (234 lb; 16 st 10 lb)
- School: Sacred Heart College, Auckland

Rugby union career
- Position: Flanker
- Current team: Blues / Auckland
Senior career
Years	Team	Apps	(Points)
2025–	Auckland	7	(5)
2027–	Blues	0	(0)
- Correct as of 11 November 2026
International career
Years	Team	Apps	(Points)
2025–2026	New Zealand U20	14	(20)
- Correct as of 11 November 2026

Caleb Woodley (born 1 July 2006) is a New Zealand rugby union player, who plays for the Blues. His preferred position is flanker.

== Early career ==
Woodley was born in Auckland and attended Sacred Heart College, Auckland. His school performances earned him selection for the NZ Maori U18 side in 2024, and selection for the Blues academy who he represented at U18 level in 2023, and U20 level in 2025. Woodley was named in the New Zealand U20 side in both 2025 and 2026.

== Professional career ==
Woodley has represented Auckland in the National Provincial Championship since 2025, being named in their squad for the 2026 Hilux NPC competition. In October 2026, he was named in the Blues wider training group for the 2027 Super Rugby Pacific season.
