= Finn Mackay =

Sociologist and feminist campaigner

- Born: 1976 or 1977 (age 48–49)
- Occupations: Sociologist; activist
- Years active: 2001–present
- Known for: Radical feminist and trans feminist activism
- Website: drfinnmackay.co.uk

Finn Mackay (born 1976 or 1977) is a British sociologist and radical trans feminist campaigner.

A senior lecturer in sociology at University of the West of England, Bristol, Mackay completed a PhD in the Centre for Gender & Violence Research at the University of Bristol. They (Note: Mackay uses they/them pronouns.) returned to academia to study the changes in the British women's liberation movement.

== Early life and identity ==
Mackay grew up in rural Scotland, and visited family in Nottingham every summer, where they played with the local boys.

Mackay identifies as "a queer butch, or transmasc, identifying with much in the trans-with-an-asterisk label". During their teenage years, Mackay was part of an all-women's peace camp, where they became involved in lesbian feminism. Mackay has also subscribed to radical feminism (an anti-patriarchal strand of feminism that believes an individual's biological role in reproduction should not matter outside of reproductive matters) since being a teen.

== Activism ==
In 2004, Mackay founded the London Feminist Network, a group helping victims of domestic violence, and has argued against the pornographication of mainstream popular culture. They have also led a revival of the "Reclaim the Night" movement, and have written about its history.

== Books ==
- Radical Feminism: Feminist Activism in Movement, Palgrave Macmillan, 2015.
- Female Masculinities and the Gender Wars: The Politics of Sex, Bloomsbury Publishing, 2021.

== See also ==
- Radical feminism
- Transgender feminism
- Feminist sex wars
- Feminist views on transgender topics
