= Mika Muliaina =

New Zealand rugby union player

- Born: 16 March 2007 (age 19) New Zealand
- Height: 177 cm (5 ft 10 in)
- Weight: 88 kg (194 lb; 13 st 12 lb)
- School: Southland Boys' High School
- Notable relative: Mils Muliaina (nephew)

Rugby union career
- Position: First five-eighth
- Current team: Highlanders / Southland
Senior career
Years	Team	Apps	(Points)
2025–	Southland	17	(46)
2027–	Highlanders	0	(0)
- Correct as of 1 November 2026
International career
Years	Team	Apps	(Points)
2026	New Zealand U20	6	(33)
- Correct as of 1 November 2026

Mika Muliaina (born 16 March 2007) is a New Zealand rugby union player, who plays for the Highlanders. His preferred position is first five-eighth.

== Early career ==
Born in New Zealand, Muliaina attended Southland Boys' High School, where as a 16-year old helped them with the NZ Schools title, and earned selection for the NZ Schools Barbarians side. After school, Muliaina joined up with the Highlanders academy, representing their U20 squad in 2025. In 2026, he represented the New Zealand U20 side. He is the nephew of former All Black Mils Muliaina.

== Professional career ==
Muliaina was named in the Southland squad for the 2025 Bunnings NPC. In December 2025, Muliaina signed a long-term contract with the Highlanders. He again represented Southland in the 2026 Hilux NPC, before being named in the Highlanders squad for the 2027 Super Rugby Pacific season.
