= Rhys Williams (rugby union, born 1979) =

Welsh rugby union player (born 1979)

Rhys Williams (born 9 October 1979) is a Welsh former rugby union player who played as a hooker. Born in Pontypool, he made one appearance for Cardiff RFC in a pre-season friendly against Bath in 2002, and was part of the Llanelli Scarlets side at the advent of regional rugby in the 2003–04 season. He played 11 times for the Scarlets, including four times in pre-season, making his last appearance in professional rugby off the bench in a 31–20 loss to Leinster on 7 November 2003.
