= Filippo Gerosa =

Italian rugby union player

- Born: 26 October 1991 (age 35) Forlimpopoli, Italy
- Height: 1.80 m (5 ft 11 in)
- Weight: 120 kg (265 lb; 18 st 13 lb)

Rugby union career
- Position: Lock
- Current team: Valorugby Emilia
Youth career
- Forlì Rugby
Senior career
| Years | Team | Apps | (Points) |
| 2010−2011 | F.I.R. Academy | | |
| 2011−2012 | Crociati Parma | 5 | (0) |
| 2012−2013 | Calvisano | 14 | (10) |
| 2013−2014 | I Cavalieri Prato | 21 | (0) |
| 2014−2016 | Viadana | 31 | (20) |
| 2015 | →Zebre | 1 | (0) |
| 2015 | →Benetton Treviso | 2 | (0) |
| 2016−2017 | Benetton Treviso | 15 | (0) |
| 2017−2020 | Petrarca Padova | 48 | (15) |
| 2020−2024 | Valorugby Emilia | 58 | (25) |
- Correct as of 27 May 2020
International career
| Years | Team | Apps | (Points) |
| 2011 | Italy Under 20 | 4 | (0) |
| 2014−2016 | Emerging Italy | 9 | (5) |
- Correct as of 30 May 2020

Filippo Gerosa (born 26 October 1991 in Forlimpopoli) is an Italian rugby union player. His usual position is as a Lock and he currently plays for Valorugby Emilia in Top12.

In 2014–15 Pro12 season, he was named like Additional Player for Zebre and in 2015–16 Pro12 season for Benetton Treviso. In 2016–17 Pro12, he also played for Benetton Treviso all the season.

After playing for Italy Under 20 in 2011, from 2014 to 2016, he also was named in the Emerging Italy squad.
