= Emiliano Caffini =

Italian rugby union player

- Born: 7 December 1989 (age 36) Mantua, Italy
- Height: 1.95 m (6 ft 5 in)
- Weight: 109 kg (240 lb; 17 st 2 lb)

Rugby union career
- Position: Lock
Youth career
- Rugby Mantova
Senior career
Years	Team	Apps	(Points)
2008−2009	F.I.R. Academy		
2009−2010	Viadana	0	(0)
2010−2011	Gran Ducato Parma	12	(0)
2011−2012	Crociati Parma	18	(0)
2012−2014	Zebre	40	(0)
2014−2015	Rovigo Delta	24	(20)
2015−2016	Zebre	14	(0)
2016−2022	Fiamme Oro	67	(25)
- Correct as of 4 August 2020
International career
Years	Team	Apps	(Points)
2008−2009	Italy Under 20	14	(0)
2012−2015	Emerging Italy	12	(0)
- Correct as of 4 August 2020

Emiliano Caffini (born 7 December 1989) is a retired Italian rugby union player. His usual position was as a Lock and he played for Fiamme Oro in Top12.

From 2012 to 2014 and in 2015–16 Pro12 season, Caffini played for Zebre.

After playing for Italy Under 20 in 2008 and 2009, from 2012 to 2015 Caffini was named in the Emerging Italy squad.
