= Patrick Mauga =

New Zealand rugby union player

- Born: 7 March 2006 (age 20) New Zealand
- Height: 189 cm (6 ft 2 in)
- Weight: 107 kg (236 lb; 16 st 12 lb)
- School: St John's College, Hastings

Rugby union career
- Position: Flanker / Number 8
- Current team: Hurricanes / Hawke's Bay
Senior career
Years	Team	Apps	(Points)
2026–	Hawke's Bay	4	(0)
2027–	Hurricanes	0	(0)
- Correct as of 8 November 2026
International career
Years	Team	Apps	(Points)
2026	New Zealand U20	6	(0)
- Correct as of 8 November 2026

Patrick Mauga (born 7 March 2006) is a New Zealand rugby union player, who plays for the Hurricanes. His preferred position is flanker or number 8.

== Early career ==
Mauga was born in New Zealand and attended St John's College, Hastings. His school performances earned him selection for in the Hawke's Bay academy. In 2026, he was named in the New Zealand U20 development side, before being named in the full squad later in the year. He plays his club rugby for Napier Old Boys Marist.

== Professional career ==
Mauga has represented Hawke's Bay in the National Provincial Championship since 2026, being named in their squad for the 2026 Hilux NPC competition. In October 2026, he was named in the Hurricanes wider training group for the 2027 Super Rugby Pacific season.
