= Charlie Sinton =

New Zealand rugby union player

- Born: 24 November 2006 (age 19)
- Height: 1.75 m (5 ft 9 in)
- Weight: 83 kg (183 lb; 13 st 1 lb)
- School: Tauranga Boys' College

Rugby union career
- Position: Scrum-half
- Current team: Chiefs
Senior career
| Years | Team | Apps | (Points) |
| 2025– | Bay of Plenty | | |
International career
| Years | Team | Apps | (Points) |
| 2025-2026 | New Zealand Under-20 | | |

Charlie Sinton (born 24 November 2006) is a New Zealand rugby union footballer who plays for Bay of Plenty and Super Rugby club Chiefs. He is a New Zealand U20 international. His preferred position is scrum-half.

== Club career ==
Having attended Tauranga Boys' College, in 2024, Sinton captained the NZ Schools team. The following year, he went on to play for Bay of Plenty in the National Provincial Championship, making his debut on 3 August 2025, coming off the bench against Tasman in a 37-7 victory at Tauranga Domain. The following week, Sinton scored his first try for the club in a 39-22 victory against Counties Manukau Steelers. He made his first start and played the full 80 minutes in a 55-19 win against Manawatu the following month.

Sinton joined Super Rugby club Chiefs ahead of the 2027 season.

== International career ==
Sinton is a New Zealand U20 international, but missed the 2025 World Rugby U20 Championship in Italy due to a late injury suffered in a pre-tournament training camp in Venice. He went on to play at the 2026 World Rugby U20 Championship in Georgia.
