= Filippo Guarducci =

Italian rugby union player

- Born: 25 August 1993 (age 33)
- Height: 184 cm (6 ft 0 in)
- Weight: 89 kg (196 lb; 14 st 0 lb)

Rugby union career
- Position: Wing
- Current team: Mogliano
Youth career
- Mogliano
Senior career
Years	Team	Apps	(Points)
2012−2023	Mogliano	132	(152)
- Correct as of 22 November 2020
International career
Years	Team	Apps	(Points)
2012−2013	Italy Under 20	14	(15)
2015	Emerging Italy	3	(0)
2014−2020	Italy Sevens	15	(20)
- Correct as of 22 November 2020

Filippo Guarducci (born 25 August 1993) is an Italian rugby union player. His usual position is Flanker. He plays for Mogliano in Top12 since 2012.

From 2012 to 2015 Guarducci was named in the Italy Under 20 squad. In 2015 he was named in Emerging Italy for the annual World Rugby Tbilisi Cup.
