= Noel Reid =

Irish rugby union player

- Born: Noel Reid; 22 May 1990 (age 36) Dublin, Ireland
- Height: 1.85 m (6 ft 1 in)
- Weight: 92 kg (14.5 st; 203 lb)
- School: St Michael's College

Rugby union career
- Position(s): Centre, Fly-half
- Current team: Toronto Arrows
Amateur team(s)
Years	Team	Apps	(Points)
- Clontarf
Senior career
Years	Team	Apps	(Points)
2011–2019	Leinster	120	(103)
2019–2020	Leicester Tigers	19	(45)
2020–2022	Agen	16	(8)
2022	London Irish	2	(8)
2023–	Toronto Arrows		
- Correct as of 18 March 2023
International career
Years	Team	Apps	(Points)
2008	Ireland Schools	2	
2009	Ireland U20	6	(34)
2013	Emerging Ireland	3	
2015	Ireland Wolfhounds	1	
2014	Ireland	1	
- Correct as of 10 February 2015

Noel Reid (born 22 May 1990) is an Irish rugby union player who currently plays for the Toronto Arrows in Major League Rugby (MLR). His preferred position is fly-half or centre.

Between 2011 and 2019 he played 120 games for Leinster. He has also played professionally for Leicester Tigers, London Irish and Agen.

== Early career ==
In 2007, Reid won the Leinster Schools Rugby Senior Cup with St Michael's College.

== Professional career ==
=== Leinster ===
He made his senior debut in September 2012 against the Scarlets and scored a hattrick on his debut. During his time at Leinster he was part of three European Rugby Champions Cup winning squads and four Pro14 winning squads.

=== Leicester Tigers ===
Ahead of the 2019–20 season, Reid joined English Premiership side Leicester Tigers. He left ahead of the 2020–21 season, having made 19 appearances.

=== Agen ===
He signed with France Top14 side Agen ahead of the 2020–21 season. Agen was relegated at the end of the season with Reid having made 11 appearances. After a further 5 appearances in the ProD2, he left for London Irish.

=== London Irish ===
Reid was signed by Premiership Rugby side London Irish in February 2022 for the remainder of the 2021–22 season. He made his debut against Harlequin sin the Premiership Rugby Cup.

== Ireland ==
Reid made his senior debut for Ireland on 14 June 2014 when coming off the bench in the second test of the tour to Argentina.
