= Jarrad Hoeata =

NZ international rugby union player

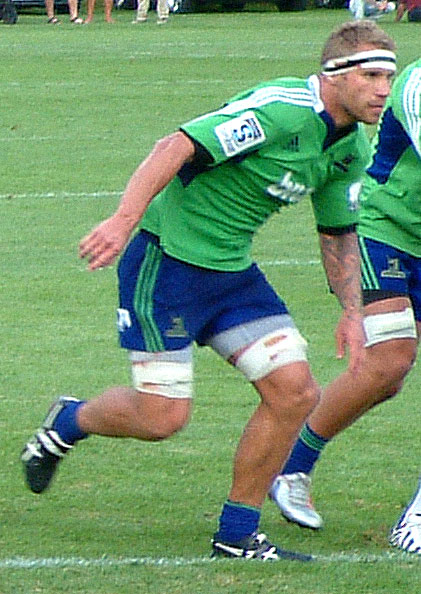
- Born: Jarrad Michael Robert Alexander Hoeata; 12 December 1983 (age 42) Tauranga, New Zealand
- Height: 1.96 m (6 ft 5 in)
- Weight: 112 kg (247 lb)
- School: Tauranga Boys' College
- Notable relative(s): Fin Hoeata (brother); Riki Hoeata (brother)

Rugby union career
- Position(s): Lock, Flanker, Number 8
Senior career
Years	Team	Apps	(Points)
2005	Canterbury	1	(0)
2006–2014	Taranaki	82	(20)
2010	Chiefs	6	(0)
2011–2014	Highlanders	53	(5)
2014–2017	Cardiff Blues	62	(5)
2017	North Harbour	10	(0)
2018	Montpellier	5	(0)
2018–20	Taranaki	9	(0)
- Correct as of 1 March 2019
International career
Years	Team	Apps	(Points)
2007–2017	New Zealand Maori	10	(0)
2011	New Zealand	3	(0)
- Correct as of 19 June 2018
National sevens team
Years	Team		Comps
2006	New Zealand		2
Coaching career
- Years: Team
- 2019–2025: Taranaki (assistant)
- 2024: New Zealand U20 (assistant)
- 2025–: New Zealand U20
- 2026–: Chiefs (assistant)
- 2026–: Taranaki

Jarrad Hoeata (born 12 December 1983) is a coach and a former professional rugby union player who plays for New Zealand side Taranaki. He made his debut for the All Blacks during the 2011 Tri Nations tournament.

== Early life ==
Hoeata was born on 12 December 1983 in Tauranga where he grew up in Papamoa in the Bay of Plenty but moved to Christchurch to study for a teaching career. He comes from a family of four brothers and a sister.

Hoeata's sporting talents centred on volleyball in which he played for the New Zealand secondary schools team in regular series against Australia. But in his latter years at school he showed some rugby talent and was selected in the Tauranga Boys' College first XV and then the Bay of Plenty secondary schools side.

After his schooldays in Tauranga, Hoeata headed for Christchurch to try his hand at Teachers College, while also having a crack at advancing his rugby. After a season of club rugby, playing alongside the likes of Andrew Mehrtens and Reuben Thorne on occasions, Canterbury officials saw his talent and was whisked into the union's academy setup and went on to play for Canterbury and the Crusaders development team.

== Domestic career ==
Hoeata largely played for Canterbury B but made one appearance for Canterbury – "in Andrew Mehrtens' last game" – a Ranfurly Shield defence against Marlborough in 2005. He came off the bench but hasn't been remembered if it was to replace Thorne on the blindside flank or one of the starting locks. The 2006 season proved to be a turning point for Hoeata, then aged 23. He made the move to Taranaki. It became clear Hoeata would have to leave Canterbury just because there were so many All Blacks there.

He added another 13 caps in 2007 from a one-match suspension. After making a dangerous charge on North Harbour fullback George Pisi. After losing much of 2008 to a serious knee injury Hoeata established himself as a regular starter for Taranaki in the 2009 Air New Zealand Cup after making 12 starts to earn himself a Super Rugby contract.

Hoeata earned a spot with the Chiefs for the 2010 Super 14 season, and spent the season as a depth player on the squad, making 5 appearances but not starting a match. But got his chance to make his Super Rugby debut off the bench against the Bulls. Hoeata's 2010 season with Taranaki started on a sour note with a drunk-driving arrest but he rebounded with his strongest season for Taranaki in the 2010 ITM Cup, scoring two tries as the province was one of the surprises of the competition.

When Jamie Joseph, who had previously coached Hoeata with the New Zealand Māori, offered Hoeata a chance to move south to join the Highlanders for the 2011 Super Rugby season, Hoeata jumped at the chance. While he played mainly at flanker with Taranaki, Joseph chose to use him as a lock and he developed into one of the form players of the competition, with his strong play keeping All Black Tom Donnelly on the substitute's bench.

In January 2018, Hoeata joined French Top 14 side Montpellier Hérault Rugby as a medical joker replacement for the injured Jacques du Plessis.

== International career ==
After a strong season with Taranaki, Hoeata was selected to the New Zealand Māori for their 2010 Centenary Series. Used as a lock by coach Jamie Joseph, he started all three games in the series and was one of the standouts in victories over Ireland and England.

Hoeata's strong performances with the Highlanders saw him garner attention as a potential future All Black, and he was selected to the national squad for the 2011 Tri Nations Series. He made his All Blacks debut on 22 July 2011 against Fiji in a 60–14 victory. However he narrowly missed selection to the victorious New Zealand squad for the 2011 Rugby World Cup.
