= Giorgi Talakhadze =

- Born: 24 August 1994 (age 32) Tbilisi, Georgia
- Height: 1.85 m (6 ft 1 in)
- Weight: 94 kg (14 st 11 lb)

Rugby union career
- Position: Centre
Senior career
Years	Team	Apps	(Points)
- Lelo Saracens
- Correct as of 28/06/2015
International career
Years	Team	Apps	(Points)
2015–	Georgia	2	(0)
- Correct as of 28/06/2015

Giorgi Talakhadze (born August 24, 1994) is a Georgian rugby union player. His position is centre, and he currently plays for Lelo Saracens in the Georgia Championship and the Georgia national team.
