= 2013 June rugby union tests =

The 2013 mid-year rugby union tests (also known as the summer internationals in the Northern Hemisphere) were international rugby union matches that were played in June 2013, mostly in the Southern Hemisphere.

These matches were played in the second year of the global rugby calendar established by the International Rugby Board (IRB), which ran until 2019. They included tests between Northern Hemisphere and Southern Hemisphere nations, whilst some of the touring teams played mid-week matches against provincial or regional sides.

The international window coincided with the 2013 British & Irish Lions tour to Australia, consisting of a three-test series between the Lions and Australia, plus seven non-test matches. South Africa hosted a quadrangular tournament, with Italy, Samoa and Scotland. France toured New Zealand, playing a three-test series and a mid-week match against the Blues. England played a two-test series against Argentina, after a warm-up match against South American XV, made up of players from Argentina, Brazil, Chile and Uruguay.

Like in 2012, the new global calendar provided expanded Test opportunities for Tier 2 nations. Japan hosted a two-test tour by Wales, their first home matches against a Tier 1 side since their defeat against Italy in 2006. Ireland visited North America, playing one test each against United States and Canada. Argentina played Georgia for the first time on home soil, and for the first time outside the Rugby World Cup.

== Overview ==
| Event | Result | Victor |
|---|---|---|
| Australia v British & Irish Lions test series | 1–2 | British & Irish Lions |
| New Zealand v France test series | 3–0 | New Zealand |
| Argentina v England test series | 0–2 | England |
| Japan v Wales test series | 1–1 | Drawn |
| South African Quadrangular Tournament | – | South Africa |

Note:

- The South African Quadrangular Tournament was a tournament that consisted of hosts South Africa and three visiting nations; Italy, Scotland and Tier 2 nation Samoa. South Africa beat Samoa in the final.

=== Other tours ===
| Team/Tour | Opponents |
|---|---|
| Ireland tour | United States (won) – Canada (won) |

== Matches ==
=== 26 May ===
26 May 2013
13:00 BST (UTC+01)

| England | 40–12 | Barbarians |
| Try: Burns 1' c Yarde 43' c Eastmond 55' m Wade 61' c Twelvetrees 66' m Con: Burns (3/4) 1', 44', 62'; Pen: Burns (3/3) 4', 11', 24' | Report | Try: Brits 70' m Daly 77' c Con: Evans (1/2) 78' |

Twickenham Stadium, London
Attendance: 60,601
Referee: Leighton Hodges (Wales)

Team details

| FB | 15 | Mike Brown | (substituted off) 52' |
| RW | 14 | Christian Wade |
| OC | 13 | Jonathan Joseph |
| IC | 12 | Billy Twelvetrees |
| LW | 11 | Marland Yarde |
| FH | 10 | Freddie Burns | (substituted off) 64' |
| SH | 9 | Richard Wigglesworth | (substituted off) 47' |
| N8 | 8 | Ben Morgan | (substituted off) 47' |
| OF | 7 | Matt Kvesic |
| BF | 6 | Tom Johnson |
| RL | 5 | Dave Attwood | (substituted off) 47' |
| LL | 4 | Joe Launchbury |
| TP | 3 | David Wilson | (substituted off) 47' |
| HK | 2 | Rob Webber (c) | (substituted off) 60' |
| LP | 1 | Alex Corbisiero | (substituted off) 57' |
Replacements:
| HK | 16 | David Paice | (substituted on) 60' |
| PR | 17 | Joe Marler | (substituted on) 57' |
| PR | 18 | Henry Thomas | (substituted on) 47' |
| LK | 19 | Kearnan Myall | (substituted on) 47' |
| N8 | 20 | Billy Vunipola | (substituted on) 47' |
| SH | 21 | Haydn Thomas | (substituted on) 47' |
| CE | 22 | Kyle Eastmond | (substituted on) 52' |
| WG | 23 | Jonny May | (substituted on) 64' |
Coach:
(England) Stuart Lancaster

| FB | 15 | (England) Elliot Daly |
| RW | 14 | (Fiji) Timoci Nagusa | (substituted off) 60' |
| OC | 13 | (New Zealand) Casey Laulala |
| IC | 12 | (England) Mike Tindall (c) |
| LW | 11 | (United States) Takudzwa Ngwenya |
| FH | 10 | (Wales) James Hook | (substituted off) 64' |
| SH | 9 | (Wales) Dwayne Peel | (substituted off) 50' |
| N8 | 8 | (France) Imanol Harinordoquy | (substituted off) 60' |
| OF | 7 | (New Zealand) Jonathan Poff |
| BF | 6 | (Italy) Alessandro Zanni |
| RL | 5 | (South Africa) Marco Wentzel |
| LL | 4 | (Scotland) Jim Hamilton | (substituted off) 57' |
| TP | 3 | (Samoa) James Johnston | (substituted off) 64' |
| HK | 2 | (Wales) Matthew Rees | (substituted off) 46' |
| LP | 1 | (Italy) Andrea Lo Cicero | (substituted off) 46' |
Replacements:
| HK | 16 | (South Africa) Schalk Brits | (substituted on) 46' |
| PR | 17 | (Wales) Duncan Jones | (substituted on) 46' |
| PR | 18 | (Wales) Paul James | (substituted on) 64' |
| LK | 19 | (Australia) Dean Mumm | (substituted on) 57' |
| FL | 20 | (England) Sam Jones | (substituted on) 60' |
| SH | 21 | (France) Dimitri Yachvili | (substituted on) 50' |
| FH | 22 | (New Zealand) Nick Evans | (substituted on) 64' |
| WG | 23 | (Hong Kong) Rowan Varty | (substituted on) 60' |
Coach:
(Wales) Dai Young

Man of the Match:
Joe Launchbury (England)

Touch judges:
Nigel Owens (Wales)
Paul Dix (England)
Television match official:
David Grashoff (England)

=== 1/2 June ===
1 June 2013
19:30 HKT (UTC+8)

| British & Irish Lions | 59–8 | Barbarians |
| Try: O'Connell 27' c Phillips (2) 32' c, 43' c Davies 57' c Cuthbert (2) 60', 69'; Lydiate 74'; A. W. Jones 80+1' m Con: Farrell (3/3) 27', 32', 43'; Sexton (2/5) 58', 76'; Pen: Farrell (3/4) 3', 20', 40' | Report | Try: Fotuali'i 56' m Pen: Daly (1/1) 15' |

Hong Kong Stadium, Hong Kong
Attendance: 28,643
Referee: Steve Walsh (Australia)

Team details

| FB | 15 | (Scotland) Stuart Hogg |
| RW | 14 | (Wales) Alex Cuthbert |
| OC | 13 | (Wales) Jonathan Davies |
| IC | 12 | (Wales) Jamie Roberts | (substituted off) 66' |
| LW | 11 | (Scotland) Sean Maitland |
| FH | 10 | (England) Owen Farrell | (substituted off) 57' |
| SH | 9 | (Wales) Mike Phillips | (substituted off) 57' |
| N8 | 8 | (Wales) Taulupe Faletau | (substituted off) 62' |
| OF | 7 | (Wales) Justin Tipuric |
| BF | 6 | (Wales) Dan Lydiate |
| RL | 5 | (Ireland) Paul O'Connell (c) | 27' to 36' | | (substituted off) 62' |
| LL | 4 | (Scotland) Richie Gray |
| TP | 3 | (Wales) Adam Jones | (substituted off) 54' |
| HK | 2 | (Wales) Richard Hibbard | (substituted off) 52' |
| LP | 1 | (England) Mako Vunipola | (substituted off) 54' |
Replacements:
| HK | 16 | (England) Tom Youngs | (substituted on) 52' |
| PR | 17 | (Ireland) Cian Healy | (substituted on) 54' |
| PR | 18 | (England) Matt Stevens | (substituted on) 54' |
| LK | 19 | (Wales) Alun Wyn Jones | (substituted on) 27' | (substituted off) 36' | (substituted on) 62' |
| N8 | 20 | (Ireland) Jamie Heaslip | (substituted on) 62' |
| SH | 21 | (Ireland) Conor Murray | (substituted on) 57' |
| FH | 22 | (Ireland) Johnny Sexton | (substituted on) 57' |
| WG | 23 | (Wales) George North | (substituted on) 66' |
Coach:
(New Zealand) Warren Gatland

| FB | 15 | (New Zealand) Jared Payne |
| RW | 14 | (New Zealand) Joe Rokocoko |
| OC | 13 | (England) Elliot Daly |
| IC | 12 | (New Zealand) Casey Laulala | | (substituted off) 68' |
| LW | 11 | (United States) Takudzwa Ngwenya | | (substituted off) 59' |
| FH | 10 | (New Zealand) Nick Evans |
| SH | 9 | (France) Dimitri Yachvili | | (substituted off) 52' |
| N8 | 8 | (Italy) Sergio Parisse (c) |
| OF | 7 | (England) Sam Jones |
| BF | 6 | (United States) Samu Manoa | | (substituted off) 10' | (substituted on) 19' |
| RL | 5 | (Australia) Dean Mumm | | (substituted off) 52' |
| LL | 4 | (South Africa) Marco Wentzel | | (substituted off) 59' |
| TP | 3 | (Italy) Martin Castrogiovanni | | (substituted off) 68' |
| HK | 2 | (South Africa) Schalk Brits | (yellow card) 7' to 17' | | | (substituted off) 44' |
| LP | 1 | (Wales) Paul James | | (substituted off) 57' |
Replacements:
| HK | 16 | (Italy) Leonardo Ghiraldini | | (substituted on) 10' | (substituted off) 19' | (substituted on) 44' |
| PR | 17 | (Wales) Duncan Jones | | (substituted on) 57' |
| PR | 18 | (Italy) Andrea Lo Cicero | | (substituted on) 68' |
| LK | 19 | (Scotland) Jim Hamilton | | (substituted on) 59' |
| N8 | 20 | (France) Imanol Harinordoquy | | (substituted on) 52' |
| SH | 21 | (Samoa) Kahn Fotuali'i | | (substituted on) 52' |
| FH | 22 | (Wales) James Hook | | (substituted on) 68' |
| WG | 23 | (England) Mike Tindall | | (substituted on) 59' |
Coach:
(Wales) Dai Young

Man of the Match:
Mike Phillips (British & Irish Lions)

Touch judges:
Lourens van der Merwe (South Africa)
Angus Gardner (Australia)
Television match official:
Matt Goddard (Australia)

2 June 2013
15:30 UYT (UTC-3)

| CONSUR XV | 21–41 | England |
| Try: Penalty try 17' c Sansot 43' c Magno 68' c Con: Madero (3/3) 18', 44', 69' | Report | Try: Foden (2) 20' m, 47' m Vunipola (3) 29' c, 32' c, 35 m Wood 39' c Doran-Jones 58' m Con: Myler (3/7) 30', 33', 40' |

Estadio Charrúa, Montevideo
Referee: Joaquín Montes (Uruguay)

Team details

| FB | 15 | (Argentina) Tomás Carrió |
| RW | 14 | (Argentina) Belisario Agulla |
| OC | 13 | (Argentina) Francisco Sansot | | (substituted off) 61' |
| IC | 12 | (Argentina) Juan Pablo Socino |
| LW | 11 | (Uruguay) Leandro Leivas | | (substituted off) 67' |
| FH | 10 | (Argentina) Benjamín Madero |
| SH | 9 | (Argentina) Tomás Cubelli (c) | | (substituted off) 70' |
| N8 | 8 | (Argentina) Antonio Ahualli | | (substituted off) 65' |
| OF | 7 | (Argentina) Javier Ortega Desio |
| BF | 6 | (Argentina) Tomás de la Vega |
| RL | 5 | (Chile) Pablo Huete | | | (substituted off) 54' | (substituted on) 63' |
| LL | 4 | (Argentina) César Fruttero | | (substituted off) 63' |
| TP | 3 | (Uruguay) Mario Sagario | | (substituted off) 49' | (substituted on) 54' | (substituted off) 63' |
| HK | 2 | (Uruguay) Arturo Ávalo | | (substituted off) 49' |
| LP | 1 | (Argentina) Bruno Postiglioni | | (substituted off) 49' |
Replacements:
| PR | 16 | (Uruguay) Alejo Corral | | (substituted on) 49' |
| PR | 17 | (Uruguay) Óscar Durán | (yellow card) 53' to 63' | (substituted on) 49' |
| HK | 18 | (Uruguay) Nicolás Klappenbach | | (substituted on) 49' |
| FL | 19 | (Uruguay) Diego Magno | | (substituted on) 63' |
| FL | 20 | (Uruguay) Juan Gaminara | | (substituted on) 65' |
| SH | 21 | (Uruguay) Agustín Ormachea | | (substituted on) 70' |
| CE | 22 | (Brazil) Moisés Duque | | (substituted on) 61' |
| CE | 23 | (Uruguay) Santiago Gibernau | | (substituted on) 67' |
Coach:
(Uruguay) Pablo Lemoine

| FB | 15 | Ben Foden |
| RW | 14 | Jonny May | (yellow card) 18' to 28' |
| OC | 13 | Luther Burrell |
| IC | 12 | Kyle Eastmond | | (substituted off) 60' |
| LW | 11 | David Strettle |
| FH | 10 | Stephen Myler |
| SH | 9 | Richard Wigglesworth | | (substituted off) 51' |
| N8 | 8 | Billy Vunipola | | | (substituted off) 73' |
| OF | 7 | Tom Johnson |
| BF | 6 | Tom Wood (c) | | (substituted off) 49' |
| RL | 5 | Kearnan Myall |
| LL | 4 | Courtney Lawes | | (substituted off) 60' |
| TP | 3 | Henry Thomas | | (substituted off) 49' |
| HK | 2 | David Paice | | (substituted off) 49' |
| LP | 1 | Joe Marler | | (substituted off) 64' | (substituted on) 73' |
Replacements:
| HK | 16 | Rob Buchanan | | (substituted on) 49' |
| PR | 17 | Alex Corbisiero | (yellow card) 71' to end' | (substituted on) 64' |
| PR | 18 | Paul Doran-Jones | | (substituted on) 49' |
| LK | 19 | Dave Attwood | | (substituted on) 60' |
| FL | 20 | Matt Kvesic | | (substituted on) 49' |
| SH | 21 | Lee Dickson | | (substituted on) 51' |
| FH | 22 | Freddie Burns |
| CE | 23 | Jonathan Joseph | | (substituted on) 60' |
Coach:
(England) Stuart Lancaster

Touch judges:
Federico Anselmi (Argentina)
Carlos Poggi (Argentina)

=== 8 June ===
8 June 2013
14:00 JST (UTC+9)

| Japan | 18–22 | Wales |
| Try: Broadhurst 38' m Fujita 69' c Con: Goromaru (1/2) 70'; Pen: Goromaru (2/4) 15', 20' | Report | Try: Robinson 63' c Con: Biggar (1/1) 64'; Pen: Biggar (4/5) 23', 29', 46', 59'; Patchell (1/1) 79' |

Kintetsu Hanazono Rugby Stadium, Osaka
Attendance: 20,152
Referee: Lourens van der Merwe (South Africa)

Team details

| FB | 15 | Ayumu Goromaru |
| RW | 14 | Yoshikazu Fujita |
| OC | 13 | Male Sa'u |
| IC | 12 | Craig Wing | (substituted off) 70' |
| LW | 11 | Kenki Fukuoka | (substituted off) 79' |
| FH | 10 | Harumichi Tatekawa |
| SH | 9 | Fumiaki Tanaka | (substituted off) 66' |
| N8 | 8 | Takashi Kikutani (c) |
| OF | 7 | Michael Broadhurst |
| BF | 6 | Hendrik Tui | (substituted off) 72' |
| RL | 5 | Shoji Ito |
| LL | 4 | Hitoshi Ono | (substituted off) 80' |
| TP | 3 | Hiroshi Yamashita | (substituted off) 64' |
| HK | 2 | Shota Horie | 30' to 32' | | (substituted off) 72' |
| LP | 1 | Masataka Mikami | (substituted off) 60' |
Replacements:
| HK | 16 | Takeshi Kizu | (substituted on) 30' | (substituted off) 32' | (substituted on) 72' |
| PR | 17 | Yusuke Nagae | (substituted on) 60' |
| PR | 18 | Kensuke Hatakeyama | (substituted on) 64' |
| LK | 19 | Toshizumi Kitagawa | (substituted on) 80' |
| FL | 20 | Ryuta Yasui | (substituted on) 72' |
| SH | 21 | Atsushi Hiwasa | (substituted on) 66' |
| FH | 22 | Yuu Tamura | (substituted on) 70' |
| WG | 23 | Hirotoki Onozawa | (substituted on) 79' |
Coach:
(Australia) Eddie Jones

| FB | 15 | Liam Williams |
| RW | 14 | Harry Robinson |
| OC | 13 | Owen Williams |
| IC | 12 | Jonathan Spratt |
| LW | 11 | Dafydd Howells |
| FH | 10 | Dan Biggar | | (substituted off) 64' |
| SH | 9 | Lloyd Williams | | (substituted off) 60' |
| N8 | 8 | Rob McCusker | (yellow card) 19' to 29' | (substituted off) 60' |
| OF | 7 | James King |
| BF | 6 | Andrew Coombs | | (substituted off) 51' |
| RL | 5 | Lou Reed |
| LL | 4 | Bradley Davies (c) |
| TP | 3 | Scott Andrews |
| HK | 2 | Emyr Phillips |
| LP | 1 | Ryan Bevington | | (substituted off) 51' |
Replacements:
| HK | 16 | Scott Baldwin |
| PR | 17 | Rhys Gill | | (substituted on) 51' |
| PR | 18 | Rhodri Jones |
| N8 | 19 | Andries Pretorius | | (substituted on) 51' |
| FL | 20 | Dan Baker | | (substituted on) 60' |
| SH | 21 | Tavis Knoyle | | (substituted on) 60' |
| FH | 22 | Rhys Patchell | | (substituted on) 64' |
| FB | 23 | Tom Prydie |
Coach:
(Wales) Robin McBryde

Touch judges:
Greg Garner (England)
Taizo Hirabayashi (Japan)

Notes:

- Dan Baker, Dafydd Howells, James King, Rhys Patchell, Emyr Phillips, Andries Pretorius and Owen Williams (all Wales) made their international debuts.

8 June 2013
19:35 NZST (UTC+12)

| New Zealand | 23–13 | France |
| Try: A. Smith 32' c Cane 37' c Con: Cruden (2/2) 33', 38; Pen: Cruden (3/6) 21', 60', 74' | Report | Try: Fofana 9' c Con: Machenaud (1/1) 10'; Pen: Machenaud (1/2) 35'; Lopez (1/1) 46' |

Eden Park, Auckland
Attendance: 45,561
Referee: Wayne Barnes (England)

Team details

| FB | 15 | Israel Dagg | (substituted off) 66' |
| RW | 14 | Ben Smith |
| OC | 13 | Conrad Smith |
| IC | 12 | Ma'a Nonu |
| LW | 11 | Julian Savea |
| FH | 10 | Aaron Cruden | (substituted off) 74' |
| SH | 9 | Aaron Smith | (substituted off) 65' |
| N8 | 8 | Kieran Read (c) |
| OF | 7 | Sam Cane |
| BF | 6 | Liam Messam |
| RL | 5 | Brodie Retallick |
| LL | 4 | Luke Romano |
| TP | 3 | Owen Franks | (substituted off) 60' |
| HK | 2 | Dane Coles | (substituted off) 55' |
| LP | 1 | Wyatt Crockett | (substituted off) 74' |
Replacements:
| HK | 16 | Keven Mealamu | (substituted on) 55' |
| PR | 17 | Ben Franks | (substituted on) 60' |
| PR | 18 | Ben Afeaki | (substituted on) 74' |
| LK | 19 | Jeremy Thrush |
| FL | 20 | Victor Vito |
| SH | 21 | Tawera Kerr-Barlow | (substituted on) 65' |
| FH | 22 | Beauden Barrett | (substituted on) 74' |
| CE | 23 | Rene Ranger | (substituted on) 66' |
Coach:
(New Zealand) Steve Hansen

| FB | 15 | Yoann Huget |
| RW | 14 | Adrien Planté |
| OC | 13 | Florian Fritz | (substituted off) 69' |
| IC | 12 | Wesley Fofana |
| LW | 11 | Maxime Médard |
| FH | 10 | Camille Lopez | (substituted off) 65' |
| SH | 9 | Maxime Machenaud | (substituted off) 42' |
| N8 | 8 | Louis Picamoles |
| OF | 7 | Fulgence Ouedraogo | (substituted off) 36' |
| BF | 6 | Thierry Dusautoir (c) |
| RL | 5 | Yoann Maestri | (substituted off) 70' |
| LL | 4 | Sébastien Vahaamahina |
| TP | 3 | Luc Ducalcon | (substituted off) 51' |
| HK | 2 | Dimitri Szarzewski | (substituted off) 57' |
| LP | 1 | Thomas Domingo | (substituted off) 51' |
Replacements:
| HK | 16 | Guilhem Guirado | (substituted on) 57' |
| PR | 17 | Vincent Debaty | (substituted on) 51' |
| PR | 18 | Daniel Kotze | (substituted on) 51' |
| LK | 19 | Alexandre Flanquart | (substituted on) 70' |
| FL | 20 | Yannick Nyanga | (substituted on) 36' |
| SH | 21 | Jean-Marc Doussain | (substituted on) 42' |
| FH | 22 | Frédéric Michalak | (substituted on) 65' |
| CE | 23 | Maxime Mermoz | (substituted on) 69' |
Coach:
(France) Philippe Saint-André

Man of the Match:
Ben Smith (New Zealand)

Touch judges:
Alain Rolland (Ireland)
James Leckie (Australia)
Television match official:
Matt Goddard (Australia)

8 June 2013
16:10 ART (UTC-03)

| Argentina | 3–32 | England |
| Pen: Bustos Moyano (1/4) 40' | Report | Try: Strettle 17' m Twelvetrees 25' c Morgan 31' c Vunipola 80'; Con: Burns (3/4) 26', 32', 80'; Pen: Burns (2/2) 8', 11' |

Estadio Padre Ernesto Martearena, Salta
Attendance: 20,000
Referee: Chris Pollock (New Zealand)

Team details

| FB | 15 | Martín Bustos Moyano |
| RW | 14 | Matías Orlando | (substituted off) 58' |
| OC | 13 | Gonzalo Tiesi |
| IC | 12 | Felipe Contepomi (c) |
| LW | 11 | Manuel Montero |
| FH | 10 | Benjamín Urdapilleta | (substituted off) 58' |
| SH | 9 | Martín Landajo | (substituted off) 67' |
| N8 | 8 | Tomás Leonardi |
| OF | 7 | Benjamín Macome |
| BF | 6 | Julio Farías Cabello | (substituted off) 71' |
| RL | 5 | Mariano Galarza |
| LL | 4 | Esteban Lozada | (substituted off) 61' |
| TP | 3 | Maximiliano Bustos | (substituted off) 66' |
| HK | 2 | Martín García Veiga | (substituted off) 54' |
| LP | 1 | Pablo Henn | (substituted off) 50' |
Replacements:
| HK | 16 | Mauricio Guidone | (substituted on) 54' |
| PR | 17 | Guillermo Roan | (substituted on) 50' |
| PR | 18 | Francisco Gómez Kodela | (substituted on) 66' |
| LK | 19 | Tomás Vallejos | (substituted on) 61' |
| FL | 20 | Tomás de la Vega | (substituted on) 71' |
| SH | 21 | Nicolás Vergallo | (substituted on) 67' |
| CE | 22 | Gabriel Ascárate | (substituted on) 58' |
| WG | 23 | Belisario Agulla | (substituted on) 58' |
Coach:
(Argentina) Santiago Phelan

| FB | 15 | Mike Brown | | (substituted off) 74' |
| RW | 14 | Christian Wade |
| OC | 13 | Jonathan Joseph | | (substituted off) 65' |
| IC | 12 | Billy Twelvetrees |
| LW | 11 | David Strettle |
| FH | 10 | Freddie Burns |
| SH | 9 | Lee Dickson | | (substituted off) 53' |
| N8 | 8 | Ben Morgan | | (substituted off) 67' |
| OF | 7 | Matt Kvesic |
| BF | 6 | Tom Wood (c) |
| RL | 5 | Dave Attwood | | (substituted off) 53' |
| LL | 4 | Joe Launchbury |
| TP | 3 | David Wilson | | (substituted off) 74' |
| HK | 2 | Rob Webber | | (substituted off) 67' |
| LP | 1 | Joe Marler | | (substituted off) 74' |
Replacements:
| HK | 16 | David Paice | | (substituted on) 67' |
| PR | 17 | Henry Thomas | | (substituted on) 74' |
| PR | 18 | Paul Doran-Jones | | (substituted on) 74' |
| LK | 19 | Courtney Lawes | (yellow card) 69' to 79' | (substituted on) 53' |
| N8 | 20 | Billy Vunipola | | (substituted on) 67' |
| SH | 21 | Richard Wigglesworth | | (substituted on) 53' |
| FH | 22 | Kyle Eastmond | | (substituted on) 65' |
| FB | 23 | Ben Foden | | (substituted on) 74' |
Coach:
(England) Stuart Lancaster

Man of the Match:
Ben Morgan (England)

Touch judges:
Nigel Owens (Wales)
Christie du Preez (South Africa)
Television match official:
Shaun Veldsman (South Africa)

8 June 2013
19:30 CDT (UTC-5)

| United States | 12–15 | Ireland |
| Pen: Wyles (4/5) 25', 32', 57', 65' | Report | Pen: Madigan (5/7) 9', 17', 30', 39', 53' |

BBVA Compass Stadium, Houston
Attendance: 20,181
Referee: Francisco Pastrana (Argentina)

Team details

| FB | 15 | Chris Wyles |
| RW | 14 | Luke Hume | | (substituted off) 61' |
| OC | 13 | Seamus Kelly |
| IC | 12 | Andrew Suniula |
| LW | 11 | Takudzwa Ngwenya |
| FH | 10 | Toby L'Estrange |
| SH | 9 | Mike Petri |
| N8 | 8 | Todd Clever (c) | (yellow card) 52' to 62' |
| OF | 7 | Scott LaValla |
| BF | 6 | Samu Manoa |
| RL | 5 | Louis Stanfill |
| LL | 4 | Brian Doyle | | 12' to 25' |
| TP | 3 | Eric Fry |
| HK | 2 | Chris Biller |
| LP | 1 | Shawn Pittman |
Replacements:
| HK | 16 | Zach Fenoglio |
| PR | 17 | Nicholas Wallace |
| PR | 18 | Phil Thiel |
| LK | 19 | Peter Dahl | | (substituted on) 12' | (substituted off) 25' |
| FL | 20 | John Quill |
| SH | 21 | Robbie Shaw |
| WG | 22 | James Paterson | | (substituted on) 61' |
| FH | 23 | Adam Siddall |
Coach:
(United States) Mike Tolkin

| FB | 15 | Robbie Henshaw |
| RW | 14 | Fergus McFadden | 35' to 40' |
| OC | 13 | Darren Cave |
| IC | 12 | Stuart Olding |
| LW | 11 | Simon Zebo |
| FH | 10 | Ian Madigan |
| SH | 9 | Isaac Boss | (substituted off) 71' |
| N8 | 8 | Peter O'Mahony (c) |
| OF | 7 | Chris Henry | 51' to 58' | | (substituted off) 76' |
| BF | 6 | Iain Henderson |
| RL | 5 | Devin Toner |
| LL | 4 | Mike McCarthy | (substituted off) 76' |
| TP | 3 | Mike Ross | (substituted off) 54' |
| HK | 2 | Richardt Strauss | (substituted off) 76' |
| LP | 1 | Dave Kilcoyne | (substituted off) 58' |
Replacements:
| HK | 16 | Mike Sherry | (substituted on) 76' |
| PR | 17 | Jamie Hagan | (substituted on) 54' |
| PR | 18 | Tom Court | (substituted on) 58' |
| LK | 19 | Dan Tuohy | (substituted on) 76' |
| FL | 20 | Tommy O'Donnell | (substituted on) 51' | (substituted off) 58' | (substituted on) 76' |
| SH | 21 | Paul Marshall | (substituted on) 71' |
| FH | 22 | Paddy Jackson |
| WG | 23 | Felix Jones | (substituted on) 35' | (substituted off) 40' |
Coach:
(Ireland) Les Kiss

Man of the Match:
Ian Madigan (Ireland)

Touch judges:
Bryan Arciero (Canada)
Chris Assmus (Canada)

Notes:

- This match set a record attendance for a United States home game.

=== 11–12 June ===
11 June 2013
19:05 NZST (UTC+12)

| Blues (New Zealand) | 15–38 | France |
| Try: Parsons 57' m Moala 62' c Con: McKenzie (1/2) 63'; Pen: Kerr (1/1) 2' | Report | Try: Fickou 44' c Nakaitaci 48' c, 51' m Kayser 66' c Con: Doussain (3/4) 45', 49', 67'; Pen: Doussain (4/5) 4', 10', 21', 24' |

North Harbour Stadium, Auckland
Attendance: 10,071
Referee: Jaco Peyper (South Africa)

Team details

| FB | 15 | Marty McKenzie |
| RW | 14 | Frank Halai |
| OC | 13 | Malakai Fekitoa |
| IC | 12 | Jackson Willison |
| LW | 11 | George Moala |
| FH | 10 | Baden Kerr | (substituted off) 17' |
| SH | 9 | Jamison Gibson-Park | (substituted off) 52' |
| N8 | 8 | Peter Saili |
| OF | 7 | Brendon O'Connor |
| BF | 6 | Kane Barrett | (substituted off) 43' |
| RL | 5 | Culum Retallick |
| LL | 4 | Anthony Boric | (substituted off) 50' |
| TP | 3 | Ofa Tu'ungafasi | (substituted off) 57' | (substituted on) 72' |
| HK | 2 | James Parsons (c) | (substituted off) 66' |
| LP | 1 | Sam Prattley | | (substituted off) 72' |
Replacements:
| HK | 16 | Quentin MacDonald | (substituted on) 66' |
| PR | 17 | Angus Ta'avao | (substituted on) 57' |
| LK | 18 | Liaki Moli | (substituted on) 50' |
| LK | 19 | Ronald Raaymakers |
| FL | 20 | Sean Polwart | (substituted on) 43' |
| FH | 21 | Chris Noakes | (substituted on) 17' | (substituted off) 52' |
| CE | 22 | Tevita Li | | (substituted on) 52' |
| SH | 23 | Wayne Ngaluafe | (substituted on) 52' |
Coach:
(New Zealand) Sir John Kirwan

| FB | 15 | Maxime Médard | (substituted off) 50' |
| RW | 14 | Noa Nakaitaci |
| OC | 13 | Gaël Fickou |
| IC | 12 | Maxime Mermoz |
| LW | 11 | Marc Andreu |
| FH | 10 | Rémi Talès | (substituted off) 47' |
| SH | 9 | Jean-Marc Doussain | (substituted off) 68' |
| N8 | 8 | Antonie Claassen |
| OF | 7 | Bernard Le Roux | (substituted off) 52' |
| BF | 6 | Yannick Nyanga (c) | (substituted off) 50' |
| RL | 5 | Alexandre Flanquart |
| LL | 4 | Christophe Samson | (substituted off) 60' |
| TP | 3 | Nicolas Mas | (substituted off) 52' |
| HK | 2 | Guilhem Guirado |
| LP | 1 | Eddy Ben Arous | (substituted off) 57' |
Replacements:
| HK | 16 | Benjamin Kayser | (substituted on) 50' |
| PR | 17 | Vincent Debaty | (substituted on) 57' |
| PR | 18 | Daniel Kötze | (substituted on) 52' |
| LK | 19 | Sébastien Vahaamahina | (substituted on) 60' |
| N8 | 20 | Damien Chouly | (substituted on) 52' |
| SH | 21 | Frédéric Michalak | (substituted on) 47' |
| FH | 22 | Camille Lopez | (substituted on) 68' |
| FB | 23 | Brice Dulin | (substituted on) 50' |
Coach:
(France) Philippe Saint-André

Touch judges:
Richard Kelly (New Zealand)
Sheldon Eden-Whaitiri (New Zealand)
Television match official:
Glenn Newman (New Zealand)

12 June 2013
18:00 FJT (UTC+12)

| Fiji | 33–14 | (New Zealand) Classic All Blacks |
| Try: Nadolo 55' c Ravulo 60' c Somoca 80' c Con: Bai (3/3) 56', 61', 80'; Pen: Bai (4/5) 2', 8', 64', 72' | Report | Try: Thomson 39' m Pen: Ai'i (3/4) 22', 29', 36' |

ANZ National Stadium, Suva
Referee: James Bolabiu (Fiji)

Team details

| FB | 15 | Timoci Nagusa |
| RW | 14 | Sireli Bobo |
| OC | 13 | Nemani Nadolo |
| IC | 12 | Seremaia Bai |
| LW | 11 | Napolioni Nalaga |
| FH | 10 | Jiuta Lutumailagi |
| SH | 9 | Nikola Matawalu |
| N8 | 8 | Masi Matadigo |
| OF | 7 | Akapusi Qera (c) |
| BF | 6 | Netani Talei |
| RL | 5 | Wame Lewaravu |
| LL | 4 | Apisalome Ratuniyarawa |
| TP | 3 | Setefano Somoca |
| HK | 2 | Viliame Veikoso |
| LP | 1 | Campese Ma'afu |
Replacements:
| HK | 16 | Tuapati Talemaitoga |
| PR | 17 | Manasa Saulo |
| PR | 18 | Jerry Yanuyanutawa |
| N8 | 19 | Api Naikatini |
| LK | 20 | Malakai Ravulo |
| FH | 21 | Nemia Kenatale |
| FB | 22 | Simeli Koniferedi |
| WG | 23 | Aisea Natoga |
| FL | 24 | Rupeni Nasiga |
Coach:
(Fiji) Inoke Male

| FB | 15 | Gavin Williams |
| RW | 14 | Sitiveni Sivivatu |
| OC | 13 | Rupeni Caucaunibuca |
| IC | 12 | Sam Tuitupou |
| LW | 11 | Josevata Rokocoko |
| FH | 10 | Orene Ai'i |
| SH | 9 | Justin Marshall (c) |
| N8 | 8 | Jerry Collins |
| OF | 7 | Chris Masoe |
| BF | 6 | Adam Thomson |
| RL | 5 | Jay Williams |
| LL | 4 | Bradley Mika |
| TP | 3 | Nick Barrett |
| HK | 2 | Jason Rutledge |
| LP | 1 | AJ Woonton |
Replacements:
| HK | 16 | Joe Ward |
| PR | 17 | Ben Suasala |
| PR | 18 | Jody Allen |
| LK | 19 | Jack Whetton |
| FL | 20 | Rodney So'oialo |
| SH | 21 | Will Whetton |
| FH | 22 | Kevin Senio |
| WG | 23 | Derek Carpenter |
| CE | 24 | Murray Williams |
Coach:
(New Zealand) Peter Sloane

Notes:

- This match was to mark Fiji's centennial celebrations (the Fiji Rugby Union was established in 1913).
- This was a full capped test match for Fiji.

=== 15 June ===
15 June 2013
14:00 JST (UTC+9)

| Japan | 23–8 | Wales |
| Try: Wing 49' c Broadhurst 60' c Con: Goromaru (2/2) 49', 61'; Pen: Goromaru (3/3) 14', 34', 76' | Report | Try: Prydie 44 m Pen: Biggar (1/2) 21' |

Chichibunomiya Rugby Stadium, Tokyo
Attendance: 21,062
Referee: Greg Garner (England)

Team details

| FB | 15 | Ayumu Goromaru |
| RW | 14 | Toshiaki Hirose (c) |
| OC | 13 | Male Sa'u |
| IC | 12 | Craig Wing | (substituted off) 69' |
| LW | 11 | Kenki Fukuoka | (substituted off) 79' |
| FH | 10 | Harumichi Tatekawa |
| SH | 9 | Fumiaki Tanaka | (substituted off) 67' |
| N8 | 8 | Takashi Kikutani |
| OF | 7 | Michael Broadhurst |
| BF | 6 | Hendrik Tui |
| RL | 5 | Shoji Ito | (substituted off) 45' |
| LL | 4 | Hitoshi Ono | (substituted off) 74' |
| TP | 3 | Hiroshi Yamashita | (substituted off) 45' |
| HK | 2 | Shota Horie | (substituted off) 79' |
| LP | 1 | Masataka Mikami | (substituted off) 69' |
Replacements:
| HK | 16 | Takeshi Kizu | (substituted on) 79' |
| PR | 17 | Yusuke Nagae | (substituted on) 69' |
| PR | 18 | Kensuke Hatakeyama | (substituted on) 45' |
| LK | 19 | Shinya Makabe | (substituted on) 45' |
| FL | 20 | Justin Ives | (substituted on) 74' |
| SH | 21 | Atsushi Hiwasa | (substituted on) 67' |
| FH | 22 | Yuu Tamura | (substituted on) 69' |
| WG | 23 | Yoshikazu Fujita | (substituted on) 79' |
Coach:
(Australia) Eddie Jones

| FB | 15 | Liam Williams | (substituted off) 53' |
| RW | 14 | Harry Robinson |
| OC | 13 | Owen Williams | (substituted off) 23' |
| IC | 12 | Jonathan Spratt |
| LW | 11 | Tom Prydie |
| FH | 10 | Dan Biggar |
| SH | 9 | Lloyd Williams | (substituted off) 50' |
| N8 | 8 | Andries Pretorius |
| OF | 7 | Josh Navidi | (substituted off) 63' |
| BF | 6 | James King |
| RL | 5 | Lou Reed | (substituted off) 50' |
| LL | 4 | Bradley Davies (c) |
| TP | 3 | Scott Andrews | (substituted off) 57' |
| HK | 2 | Emyr Phillips | (substituted off) 78' |
| LP | 1 | Rhys Gill | (substituted off) 57' |
Replacements:
| HK | 16 | Scott Baldwin | (substituted on) 78' |
| PR | 17 | Rhodri Jones | (substituted on) 57' |
| PR | 18 | Craig Mitchell | (substituted on) 57' |
| LK | 19 | Andrew Coombs | (substituted on) 50' |
| FL | 20 | Dan Baker | (substituted on) 63' |
| SH | 21 | Tavis Knoyle | (substituted on) 50' |
| FH | 22 | Rhys Patchell | (substituted on) 23' |
| WG | 23 | Dafydd Howells | (substituted on) 53' |
Coach:
(Wales) Robin McBryde

Touch judges:
Lourens van der Merwe (South Africa)
Taizo Hirabayashi (Japan)

Notes:

- This was Japan's first ever victory over Wales.

15 June 2013
19:35 NZST (UTC+12)

| New Zealand | 30–0 | France |
| Try: Savea 3', c B Smith 48' c Barrett 76' c Con: Cruden (3/3) 4', 49', 77'; Pen: Cruden (3/4) 22', 54', 64' | Report |

Rugby League Park, Christchurch
Attendance: 20,785
Referee: Alain Rolland (Ireland)

Team details

| FB | 15 | Israel Dagg |
| RW | 14 | Ben Smith | (substituted off) 75' |
| OC | 13 | Conrad Smith |
| IC | 12 | Ma'a Nonu |
| LW | 11 | Julian Savea | (substituted off) 59' |
| FH | 10 | Aaron Cruden |
| SH | 9 | Aaron Smith | (substituted off) 59' |
| N8 | 8 | Kieran Read (c) |
| OF | 7 | Sam Cane |
| BF | 6 | Liam Messam | (substituted off) 62' |
| RL | 5 | Sam Whitelock | (substituted off) 68' |
| LL | 4 | Luke Romano |
| TP | 3 | Owen Franks | (substituted off) 68' |
| HK | 2 | Dane Coles | (substituted off) 58' |
| LP | 1 | Wyatt Crockett | (substituted off) 62' |
Replacements:
| HK | 16 | Andrew Hore | (substituted on) 58' |
| PR | 17 | Tony Woodcock | (substituted on) 62' |
| PR | 18 | Ben Franks | (substituted on) 68' |
| LK | 19 | Jeremy Thrush | (substituted on) 68' |
| FL | 20 | Victor Vito | (substituted on) 62' |
| SH | 21 | Piri Weepu | (substituted on) 59' |
| FH | 22 | Beauden Barrett | (substituted on) 75' |
| CE | 23 | Rene Ranger | (substituted on) 59' |
Coach:
(New Zealand) Steve Hansen

| FB | 15 | Maxime Médard | (substituted off) 40' |
| RW | 14 | Adrien Planté |
| OC | 13 | Florian Fritz | (substituted off) 59' |
| IC | 12 | Wesley Fofana |
| LW | 11 | Yoann Huget |
| FH | 10 | Frédéric Michalak |
| SH | 9 | Maxime Machenaud | (substituted off) 64' |
| N8 | 8 | Louis Picamoles | (substituted off) 53' |
| OF | 7 | Bernard Le Roux |
| BF | 6 | Thierry Dusautoir (c) |
| RL | 5 | Yoann Maestri |
| LL | 4 | Christophe Samson | (substituted off) 64' |
| TP | 3 | Nicolas Mas | (substituted off) 67' |
| HK | 2 | Dimitri Szarzewski | (substituted off) 50' |
| LP | 1 | Thomas Domingo | (substituted off) 67' |
Replacements:
| HK | 16 | Benjamin Kayser | (substituted on) 50' |
| PR | 17 | Vincent Debaty | (substituted on) 67' |
| PR | 18 | Luc Ducalcon | (substituted on) 67' |
| LK | 19 | Sébastien Vahaamahina | (substituted on) 64' |
| FL | 20 | Yannick Nyanga | (substituted on) 53' |
| FB | 21 | Brice Dulin | (substituted on) 40' |
| FH | 22 | Rémi Talès | (substituted on) 64' |
| CE | 23 | Mathieu Bastareaud | (substituted on) 59' |
Coach:
(France) Philippe Saint-André

Touch judges:
Wayne Barnes (England)
James Leckie (Australia)
Television match official:
George Ayoub (Australia)

Notes:

- This was the 500th test match for the All Blacks in 110 years
- Captaining the All Blacks for the third time, Kieran Read earned his 50th cap in this match.
- This was the first time France has failed to score against the All Blacks.

15 June 2013
16:10 ART (UTC-03)

| Argentina | 26–51 | England |
| Try: Montero 49' c Leonardi 69' c Con: Moyano (2/2) 50', 70'; Pen: Moyano (4/4) 3', 10', 21', 26' | Report | Try: Penalty try (2) 30' c, 40' c Burns 36' m Webber 53' m Yarde (2) 57' c, 73' c Eastmond 64' c Con: Burns (4/6) 30', 40', 58', 65'; Myler (1/1) 74'; Pen: Burns (2/3) 7', 24' |

Estadio José Amalfitani, Buenos Aires
Referee: Nigel Owens (Wales)

Team details

| FB | 15 | Martín Bustos Moyano | (yellow card) 39' to 49' |
| RW | 14 | Belisario Agulla |
| OC | 13 | Gonzalo Tiesi |
| IC | 12 | Gabriel Ascárate | | (substituted off) 72' |
| LW | 11 | Manuel Montero | | (substituted off) 66' |
| FH | 10 | Felipe Contepomi (c) |
| SH | 9 | Nicolás Vergallo | | (substituted off) 59' |
| N8 | 8 | Tomás Leonardi |
| OF | 7 | Benjamín Macome |
| BF | 6 | Rodrigo Baez | | (substituted off) 59' |
| RL | 5 | Mariano Galarza |
| LL | 4 | Julio Farías Cabello | | (substituted off) 52' |
| TP | 3 | Maximiliano Bustos | | (substituted off) 66' |
| HK | 2 | Martín García Veiga |
| LP | 1 | Guillermo Roan | | (substituted off) 40' |
Replacements:
| HK | 16 | Mauricio Guidone | | | (substituted on) 55' |
| PR | 17 | Pablo Henn | | (substituted on) 40' | (substituted off) 55' |
| PR | 18 | Francisco Gómez Kodela | | (substituted on) 66' |
| LK | 19 | Esteban Lozada | | (substituted on) 52' |
| FL | 20 | Tomás de la Vega | | (substituted on) 59' |
| SH | 21 | Tomás Cubelli | | (substituted on) 59' |
| FH | 22 | Benjamín Madero | | (substituted on) 72' |
| CE | 23 | Matías Orlando | | (substituted on) 66' |
Coach:
(Argentina) Santiago Phelan

| FB | 15 | Mike Brown | (substituted off) 59' |
| RW | 14 | Jonny May |
| OC | 13 | Jonathan Joseph |
| IC | 12 | Kyle Eastmond |
| LW | 11 | Marland Yarde |
| FH | 10 | Freddie Burns | (substituted off) 65' |
| SH | 9 | Lee Dickson | (substituted off) 55' |
| N8 | 8 | Ben Morgan | (substituted off) 59' |
| OF | 7 | Matt Kvesic |
| BF | 6 | Tom Wood (c) |
| RL | 5 | Dave Attwood | (substituted off) 50' |
| LL | 4 | Joe Launchbury |
| TP | 3 | David Wilson | (substituted off) 75' |
| HK | 2 | Rob Webber | (substituted off) 61' |
| LP | 1 | Joe Marler | (substituted off) 65' |
Replacements:
| HK | 16 | David Paice | (substituted on) 61' |
| PR | 17 | Paul Doran-Jones | (substituted on) 65' |
| PR | 18 | Henry Thomas | (substituted on) 75' |
| LK | 19 | Courtney Lawes | (substituted on) 50' |
| N8 | 20 | Billy Vunipola | (substituted on) 59' |
| SH | 21 | Richard Wigglesworth | (substituted on) 55' |
| FH | 22 | Stephen Myler | (substituted on) 65' |
| FB | 23 | Ben Foden | (substituted on) 59' |
Coach:
(England) Stuart Lancaster

Man of the Match:
Marland Yarde (England)

Touch judges:
Marius Jonker (South Africa)
Christie du Preez (South Africa)
Television match official:
Shaun Veldsman (South Africa)

Notes:

- Winger Christian Wade was named in the starting XV, but was withdrawn following a British & Irish Lions call-up
- First test series win for England in Argentina since 1981

15 June 2013
20:00 EDT (UTC-04)

| Canada | 14–40 | Ireland |
| Try: Ardron 46' m Pen: Pritchard (3/3) 6', 17', 24' | Report | Try: Trimble 9' c McFadden (3) 27' m, 58' c, 80+1' c Cave 54' c O'Donnell 67' c Con: Madigan (3/4) 11', 55', 59'; Jackson (2/2) 68', 80+2' |

BMO Field, Toronto
Attendance: 20,396
Referee: Leighton Hodges (Wales)

Team details

| FB | 15 | Connor Braid | (substituted off) 61' |
| RW | 14 | James Pritchard |
| OC | 13 | Ciaran Hearn |
| IC | 12 | Harry Jones |
| LW | 11 | Taylor Paris |
| FH | 10 | Nathan Hirayama |
| SH | 9 | Phil Mack | (substituted off) 55' |
| N8 | 8 | Aaron Carpenter (c) | (substituted off) 79' |
| OF | 7 | John Moonlight | (substituted off) 61' |
| BF | 6 | Tyler Ardron |
| RL | 5 | Tyler Hotson | (substituted off) 69' |
| LL | 4 | Jebb Sinclair |
| TP | 3 | Jason Marshall | (substituted off) 72' |
| HK | 2 | Ray Barkwill | (substituted off) 54' |
| LP | 1 | Hubert Buydens | (substituted off) 72' |
Replacements:
| HK | 16 | Ryan Hamilton | (substituted on) 54' |
| PR | 17 | Andrew Tiedemann | (substituted on) 72' |
| PR | 18 | Doug Wooldridge | (substituted on) 72' |
| LK | 19 | Jon Phelan | (substituted on) 69' |
| FL | 20 | Nanyak Dala | (substituted on) 61' |
| SH | 21 | Sean White | (substituted on) 55' |
| CE | 22 | Nick Blevins | (substituted on) 79' |
| CE | 23 | Pat Parfrey | (substituted on) 61' |
Coach:
(New Zealand) Kieran Crowley

| FB | 15 | Felix Jones |
| RW | 14 | Fergus McFadden |
| OC | 13 | Darren Cave | (substituted off) 72' |
| IC | 12 | James Downey |
| LW | 11 | Andrew Trimble |
| FH | 10 | Ian Madigan | (substituted off) 61' |
| SH | 9 | Isaac Boss | (substituted off) 57' |
| N8 | 8 | Peter O'Mahony (c) |
| OF | 7 | Tommy O'Donnell |
| BF | 6 | Kevin McLaughlin | (substituted off) 71' |
| RL | 5 | Devin Toner |
| LL | 4 | Dan Tuohy | (substituted off) 71' |
| TP | 3 | Mike Ross | (substituted off) 61' |
| HK | 2 | Richardt Strauss | (substituted off) 65' |
| LP | 1 | Tom Court | (substituted off) 65' |
Replacements:
| HK | 16 | Seán Cronin | (substituted on) 65' |
| PR | 17 | Dave Kilcoyne | (substituted on) 65' |
| PR | 18 | Declan Fitzpatrick | (substituted on) 61' |
| LK | 19 | Mike McCarthy | (substituted on) 71' |
| FL | 20 | Chris Henry | (substituted on) 71' |
| SH | 21 | Paul Marshall | (substituted on) 57' |
| FH | 22 | Paddy Jackson | (substituted on) 61' |
| FB | 23 | Robbie Henshaw | (substituted on) 72' |
Coach:
(Ireland) Les Kiss

Man of the Match:
Fergus McFadden (Ireland)

Touch judges:
Nick Ricono (United States)
Ed Gardner (United States)

Notes:

- This match set a record attendance for a rugby match on Canadian soil.

=== 22 June ===
22 June 2013
19:35 NZST (UTC+12)

| New Zealand | 24–9 | France |
| Try: B Smith 35' m Barrett 80'; Con: Carter (1/2) 80+1'; Pen: Carter (4/6) 15', 49', 58', 72' | Report | Pen: Doussain (2/4) 39', 45'; Drop: Fritz 7' |

Yarrow Stadium, New Plymouth
Attendance: 23,000
Referee: Nigel Owens (Wales)

Team details

| FB | 15 | Israel Dagg |
| RW | 14 | Ben Smith |
| OC | 13 | Conrad Smith |
| IC | 12 | Ma'a Nonu | (substituted off) 77' |
| LW | 11 | Rene Ranger | (substituted off) 72' |
| FH | 10 | Dan Carter |
| SH | 9 | Piri Weepu | (substituted off) 41' |
| N8 | 8 | Kieran Read (c) |
| OF | 7 | Sam Cane | (substituted off) 72' |
| BF | 6 | Victor Vito | (substituted off) 70' |
| RL | 5 | Sam Whitelock |
| LL | 4 | Luke Romano |
| TP | 3 | Owen Franks |
| HK | 2 | Andrew Hore | (substituted off) 63' |
| LP | 1 | Wyatt Crockett | (substituted off) 41' |
Replacements:
| HK | 16 | Keven Mealamu | (substituted on) 63' |
| PR | 17 | Tony Woodcock | (substituted on) 41' |
| PR | 18 | Ben Franks |
| FL | 19 | Steve Luatua | (substituted on) 70' |
| N8 | 20 | Matt Todd | (substituted on) 72' |
| SH | 21 | Tawera Kerr-Barlow | (substituted on) 41' |
| FH | 22 | Beauden Barrett | (substituted on) 77' |
| WG | 23 | Charles Piutau | (substituted on) 72' |
Coach:
(New Zealand) Steve Hansen

| FB | 15 | Brice Dulin |
| RW | 14 | Marc Andreu |
| OC | 13 | Florian Fritz | | | (substituted off) 63' |
| IC | 12 | Wesley Fofana |
| LW | 11 | Yoann Huget | | 3' to 9' |
| FH | 10 | Rémi Talès | | (substituted off) 72' |
| SH | 9 | Jean-Marc Doussain | | (substituted off) 58' |
| N8 | 8 | Antonie Claassen | | (substituted off) 72' |
| OF | 7 | Damien Chouly |
| BF | 6 | Thierry Dusautoir (c) |
| RL | 5 | Yoann Maestri | (yellow card) 71' to end' |
| LL | 4 | Alexandre Flanquart | | (substituted off) 58' |
| TP | 3 | Nicolas Mas | | (substituted off) 64' |
| HK | 2 | Benjamin Kayser | | (substituted off) 64' |
| LP | 1 | Thomas Domingo | | (substituted off) 64' |
Replacements:
| HK | 16 | Dimitri Szarzewski | | (substituted on) 64' |
| PR | 17 | Eddy Ben Arous | | (substituted on) 64' |
| PR | 18 | Luc Ducalcon | | (substituted on) 64' |
| LK | 19 | Sébastien Vahaamahina | | (substituted on) 58' |
| FL | 20 | Bernard Le Roux | | (substituted on) 72' |
| SH | 21 | Maxime Machenaud | | (substituted on) 58' |
| FH | 22 | Camille Lopez | | (substituted on) 72' |
| CE | 23 | Mathieu Bastareaud | | (substituted on) 3' (substituted off) 9' | (substituted on) 63' |
Coach:
(France) Philippe Saint-André

Touch judges:
Alain Rolland (Ireland)
Wayne Barnes (England)
Television match official:
George Ayoub (Australia)

22 June 2013
20:00 AEST (UTC+10)

| Australia | 21–23 | British & Irish Lions |
| Try: Folau (2) 12' c, 34' m Con: O'Connor (1/2) 13'; Pen: O'Connor (1/3) 51'; Beale (2/4) 61', 68' | Report | Try: North 25' c Cuthbert 48' c Con: Halfpenny (2/2) 27', 48'; Pen: Halfpenny (3/4) 23', 31', 65' |

Lang Park, Brisbane
Attendance: 52,499
Referee: Chris Pollock (New Zealand)

Team details

| FB | 15 | Berrick Barnes | (substituted off) 38' |
| RW | 14 | Israel Folau |
| OC | 13 | Adam Ashley-Cooper | (substituted off) 76' |
| IC | 12 | Christian Lealiifano | (substituted off) 1' |
| LW | 11 | Digby Ioane |
| FH | 10 | James O'Connor |
| SH | 9 | Will Genia |
| N8 | 8 | Wycliff Palu |
| OF | 7 | Michael Hooper |
| BF | 6 | Ben Mowen |
| RL | 5 | James Horwill (c) |
| LL | 4 | Kane Douglas | (substituted off) 68' |
| TP | 3 | Ben Alexander | (substituted off) 57' |
| HK | 2 | Stephen Moore |
| LP | 1 | Benn Robinson | (substituted off) 68' |
Replacements:
| HK | 16 | Saia Fainga'a |
| PR | 17 | James Slipper | (substituted on) 68' |
| PR | 18 | Sekope Kepu | (substituted on) 57' |
| LK | 19 | Rob Simmons | (substituted on) 68' |
| FL | 20 | Liam Gill | | (substituted on) 46' |
| SH | 21 | Nick Phipps | (substituted on) 76' |
| CE | 22 | Pat McCabe | (substituted on) 1' | (substituted off) 46' |
| FH | 23 | Kurtley Beale | (substituted on) 38' |
Coach:
(New Zealand) Robbie Deans

| FB | 15 | (Wales) Leigh Halfpenny |
| RW | 14 | (Wales) Alex Cuthbert |
| OC | 13 | (Ireland) Brian O'Driscoll |
| IC | 12 | (Wales) Jonathan Davies |
| LW | 11 | (Wales) George North |
| FH | 10 | (Ireland) Johnny Sexton |
| SH | 9 | (Wales) Mike Phillips | (substituted off) 62' |
| N8 | 8 | (Ireland) Jamie Heaslip |
| OF | 7 | (Wales) Sam Warburton (c) |
| BF | 6 | (England) Tom Croft | (substituted off) 72' |
| RL | 5 | (Ireland) Paul O'Connell |
| LL | 4 | (Wales) Alun Wyn Jones | (substituted off) 70' |
| TP | 3 | (Wales) Adam Jones | (substituted off) 51' |
| HK | 2 | (England) Tom Youngs | (substituted off) 64' |
| LP | 1 | (England) Alex Corbisiero | (substituted off) 51' |
Replacements:
| HK | 16 | (Wales) Richard Hibbard | (substituted on) 64' |
| PR | 17 | (England) Mako Vunipola | (substituted on) 51' |
| PR | 18 | (England) Dan Cole | (substituted on) 51' |
| LK | 19 | (England) Geoff Parling | (substituted on) 70' |
| FL | 20 | (Wales) Dan Lydiate | (substituted on) 72' |
| SH | 21 | (England) Ben Youngs | (substituted on) 62' |
| FH | 22 | (England) Owen Farrell |
| WG | 23 | (Scotland) Sean Maitland |
Coach:
(New Zealand) Warren Gatland

Man of the Match
George North (British & Irish Lions)

Touch judges:
Craig Joubert (South Africa)
Romain Poite (France)
Television match official:
Vinny Munro (New Zealand)

22 June 2013
16:10 ART (UTC-03)

| Argentina | 29–18 | Georgia |
| Try: Cubelli 76' c Pen: Moyano (8/11) 2', 17', 38', 45', 50', 53', 61', 70' | Report (Spanish) | Pen: Tsiklauri (4/4) 7', 15', 31', 34'; Malaghuradze (1/1) 72'; Drop: Tsiklauri 57' |

Estadio San Juan del Bicentenario, San Juan
Referee: George Clancy (Ireland)

Team details

| FB | 15 | Martín Bustos Moyano | (substituted off) 72' |
| RW | 14 | Belisario Agulla |
| OC | 13 | Gabriel Ascárate |
| IC | 12 | Gonzalo Tiesi (c) | (substituted off) 68' |
| LW | 11 | Tomás Carrió |
| FH | 10 | Benjamín Madero |
| SH | 9 | Tomás Cubelli |
| N8 | 8 | Benjamín Macome |
| OF | 7 | Tomás de la Vega | (substituted off) 60' |
| BF | 6 | Rodrigo Baez |
| RL | 5 | Mariano Galarza |
| LL | 4 | Esteban Lozada | (substituted off) 60' |
| TP | 3 | Maximiliano Bustos | (substituted off) 79' |
| HK | 2 | Martín García Veiga | (substituted off) 79' |
| LP | 1 | Guillermo Roan | (substituted off) 78' |
Replacements:
| HK | 16 | Mauricio Guidone | (substituted on) 79' |
| PR | 17 | Bruno Postiglioni | (substituted on) 78' |
| PR | 18 | Francisco Gómez Kodela | (substituted on) 79' |
| LK | 19 | Tomás Vallejos | (substituted on) 60' |
| FL | 20 | Tomás Leonardi | (substituted on) 60' |
| SH | 21 | Martín Landajo |
| FH | 22 | Benjamín Urdapilleta | (substituted on) 72' |
| CE | 23 | Matías Orlando | (substituted on) 68' |
Coach:
(Argentina) Santiago Phelan

| FB | 15 | Beka Tsiklauri | (substituted off) 71' |
| RW | 14 | Irakli Machkhaneli (c) |
| OC | 13 | David Kacharava |
| IC | 12 | Merab Sharikadze |
| LW | 11 | Tamaz Mchedlidze |
| FH | 10 | Lasha Khmaladze | (substituted off) 66' |
| SH | 9 | Giorgi Begadze | (substituted off) 66' |
| N8 | 8 | Giorgi Chkhaidze |
| OF | 7 | Viktor Kolelishvili |
| BF | 6 | Shalva Sutiashvili | (substituted off) 78' |
| RL | 5 | Levan Datunashvili |
| LL | 4 | Vakhtang Maisuradze | (substituted off) 60' |
| TP | 3 | Davit Zirakashvili | (substituted off) 71' |
| HK | 2 | Jaba Bregvadze | (substituted off) 71' |
| LP | 1 | Vasil Kakovin | (substituted off) 63' |
Replacements:
| HK | 16 | Revaz Belkania | (substituted on) 71' |
| PR | 17 | Anton Peikrishvili | (substituted on) 63' |
| PR | 18 | Levan Chilachava | (substituted on) 71' |
| LK | 19 | Giorgi Nemsadze | (substituted on) 60' |
| FL | 20 | Beka Bitsadze | (substituted on) 78' |
| SH | 21 | Vazha Khutsishvili | (substituted on) 66' |
| FH | 22 | Lasha Malaghuradze | (substituted on) 66' |
| WG | 23 | Irakli Kiasashvili | (substituted on) 71' |
Coach:
(New Zealand) Milton Haig

Touch judges:
Marius Jonker (South Africa)
Christie du Preez (South Africa)
Television match official:
Shaun Veldsman (South Africa)

=== 29 June ===
29 June 2013
20:00 AEST (UTC+10)

| Australia | 16–15 | British & Irish Lions |
| Try: Ashley-Cooper 74' c Con: Lealiifano (1/1) 76'; Pen: Lealiifano (3/3) 16', 23', 36 | Report | Pen: Halfpenny (5/7) 9', 27', 32', 39', 62' |

Docklands Stadium, Melbourne
Attendance: 56,771
Referee: Craig Joubert (South Africa)

Team details

| FB | 15 | Kurtley Beale |
| RW | 14 | Israel Folau |
| OC | 13 | Adam Ashley-Cooper |
| IC | 12 | Christian Lealiifano |
| LW | 11 | Joe Tomane |
| FH | 10 | James O'Connor |
| SH | 9 | Will Genia |
| N8 | 8 | Wycliff Palu | (substituted off) 60' |
| OF | 7 | Michael Hooper |
| BF | 6 | Ben Mowen |
| RL | 5 | James Horwill (c) |
| LL | 4 | Kane Douglas | (substituted off) 53' |
| TP | 3 | Ben Alexander | (substituted off) 58' |
| HK | 2 | Stephen Moore |
| LP | 1 | Benn Robinson | (substituted off) 60' | (substituted on) 76' |
Replacements:
| HK | 16 | Saia Fainga'a |
| PR | 17 | James Slipper | (substituted on) 60' | (substituted off) 76' |
| PR | 18 | Sekope Kepu | (substituted on) 58' |
| LK | 19 | Rob Simmons | (substituted on) 53' |
| FL | 20 | Liam Gill | (substituted on) 60' |
| SH | 21 | Nick Phipps |
| CE | 22 | Rob Horne |
| FB | 23 | Jesse Mogg |
Coach:
(New Zealand) Robbie Deans

| FB | 15 | (Wales) Leigh Halfpenny |
| RW | 14 | (Ireland) Tommy Bowe |
| OC | 13 | (Ireland) Brian O'Driscoll |
| IC | 12 | (Wales) Jonathan Davies |
| LW | 11 | (Wales) George North |
| FH | 10 | (Ireland) Johnny Sexton |
| SH | 9 | (England) Ben Youngs | (substituted off) 53' |
| N8 | 8 | (Ireland) Jamie Heaslip | (substituted off) 62' |
| OF | 7 | (Wales) Sam Warburton (c) | (substituted off) 66' |
| BF | 6 | (Wales) Dan Lydiate |
| RL | 5 | (England) Geoff Parling |
| LL | 4 | (Wales) Alun Wyn Jones |
| TP | 3 | (Wales) Adam Jones | (substituted off) 58' |
| HK | 2 | (England) Tom Youngs | (substituted off) 56' |
| LP | 1 | (England) Mako Vunipola |
Replacements:
| HK | 16 | (Wales) Richard Hibbard | (substituted on) 56' |
| PR | 17 | (Scotland) Ryan Grant |
| PR | 18 | (England) Dan Cole | (substituted on) 58' |
| FL | 19 | (England) Tom Croft | (substituted on) 66' |
| FL | 20 | (Ireland) Seán O'Brien | (substituted on) 62' |
| SH | 21 | (Ireland) Conor Murray | (substituted on) 53' |
| FH | 22 | (England) Owen Farrell |
| WG | 23 | (Wales) Alex Cuthbert |
Coach:
(New Zealand) Warren Gatland

Man of the Match
Christian Lealiifano (Australia)

Touch judges:
Chris Pollock (New Zealand)
Romain Poite (France)
Television match official:
Ben Skeen (New Zealand)

=== 6 July ===
6 July 2013
20:00 AEST (UTC+10)

| Australia | 16–41 | British & Irish Lions |
| Try: O'Connor 40' c Con: Lealiifano (1/1) 40'; Pen: Lealiifano (3/3) 8', 41', 45' | Report | Try: Corbisiero 1' c Sexton 57' c North 64' m Roberts 67' c Con: Halfpenny (3/4) 2', 57', 69'; Pen: Halfpenny (5/5) 7', 12', 15', 25', 51' |

Stadium Australia, Sydney
Attendance: 83,702
Referee: Romain Poite (France)

Team details

| FB | 15 | Kurtley Beale |
| RW | 14 | Israel Folau | | (substituted off) 27' |
| OC | 13 | Adam Ashley-Cooper |
| IC | 12 | Christian Lealiifano |
| LW | 11 | Joe Tomane |
| FH | 10 | James O'Connor |
| SH | 9 | Will Genia | | (substituted off) 70' |
| N8 | 8 | Wycliff Palu | | (substituted off) 60' |
| OF | 7 | George Smith | | (substituted off) 4' | (substituted on) 9' | (substituted off) 27' | (substituted on) 35' | (substituted off) 66' |
| BF | 6 | Ben Mowen |
| RL | 5 | James Horwill (c) |
| LL | 4 | Kane Douglas | | (substituted off) 62' |
| TP | 3 | Ben Alexander | (yellow card) 24' to 34' | | | | (substituted off) 35' |
| HK | 2 | Stephen Moore | | 55' to 63' | | (substituted off) 72' |
| LP | 1 | Benn Robinson | | (substituted off) 66' |
Replacements:
| HK | 16 | Saia Fainga'a | | (substituted on) 55' | (substituted off) 63' | (substituted on) 72' |
| PR | 17 | James Slipper | | (substituted on) 66' |
| PR | 18 | Sekope Kepu | | | | (substituted on) 27' |
| LK | 19 | Rob Simmons | | (substituted on) 62' |
| FL | 20 | Ben McCalman | | (substituted on) 60' |
| FL | 21 | Michael Hooper | | (substituted on) 4' | (substituted off) 9' | | | (substituted on) 66' |
| SH | 22 | Nick Phipps | | (substituted on) 70' |
| FB | 23 | Jesse Mogg | | (substituted on) 27' |
Coach:
(New Zealand) Robbie Deans

| FB | 15 | (Wales) Leigh Halfpenny |
| RW | 14 | (Ireland) Tommy Bowe |
| OC | 13 | (Wales) Jonathan Davies |
| IC | 12 | (Wales) Jamie Roberts | (substituted off) 69' |
| LW | 11 | (Wales) George North |
| FH | 10 | (Ireland) Johnny Sexton | (substituted off) 63' |
| SH | 9 | (Wales) Mike Phillips | (substituted off) 51' |
| N8 | 8 | (Wales) Taulupe Faletau | 55' to 59' |
| OF | 7 | (Ireland) Seán O'Brien | | (substituted off) 59' |
| BF | 6 | (Wales) Dan Lydiate |
| RL | 5 | (England) Geoff Parling | (substituted off) 67' |
| LL | 4 | (Wales) Alun Wyn Jones (c) |
| TP | 3 | (Wales) Adam Jones | (substituted off) 55' |
| HK | 2 | (Wales) Richard Hibbard | (substituted off) 47' |
| LP | 1 | (England) Alex Corbisiero | (substituted off) 67' |
Replacements:
| HK | 16 | (England) Tom Youngs | (substituted on) 47' |
| PR | 17 | (England) Mako Vunipola | (substituted on) 67' |
| PR | 18 | (England) Dan Cole | (substituted on) 55' |
| LK | 19 | (Scotland) Richie Gray | (substituted on) 67' |
| FL | 20 | (Wales) Justin Tipuric | (substituted on) 55' |
| SH | 21 | (Ireland) Conor Murray | (substituted on) 51' |
| FH | 22 | (England) Owen Farrell | (substituted on) 63' |
| CE | 23 | (England) Manu Tuilagi | (substituted on) 69' |
Coach:
(New Zealand) Warren Gatland

Man of the Match
Leigh Halfpenny (British & Irish Lions)

Touch judges:
Chris Pollock (New Zealand)
Craig Joubert (South Africa)
Television match official:
Vinny Munro (New Zealand)

== South African quadrangular tournament ==
On 6 December 2012, the SARU announced that South Africa would host Samoa, Italy and Scotland in a four-team tournament. The hosts and Samoa each played Italy and Scotland in a league format. On June 22, the top two teams, South Africa and Samoa, played to determine first and second place, and the bottom two, Scotland and Italy, played for third and fourth place.

| | Team | Played | Won | Drawn | Lost | Points For | Points Against | Points Difference | Tries For | Tries Against | Try Bonus | Losing Bonus | Points |
|---|---|---|---|---|---|---|---|---|---|---|---|---|---|
| 1 | South Africa | 3 | 3 | 0 | 0 | 130 | 50 | +80 | 16 | 5 | 2 | 0 | 14 |
| 2 | Samoa | 3 | 2 | 0 | 1 | 89 | 83 | +6 | 10 | 10 | 1 | 0 | 9 |
| 3 | Scotland | 3 | 1 | 0 | 2 | 64 | 86 | −22 | 9 | 10 | 0 | 0 | 4 |
| 4 | Italy | 3 | 0 | 0 | 3 | 49 | 113 | −64 | 4 | 13 | 0 | 1 | 1 |
Points breakdown: *4 points for a win;*2 points for a draw;*1 bonus point for a loss by 7 points or less;*1 bonus point for scoring 4 or more tries

=== Matches ===
8 June 2013
14:15 SAST (UTC+02)

| Samoa | 27–17 | Scotland |
| Try: So'oialo 6' c Tuilagi (2) 11' c, 62' c Con: So'oialo (3/3) 8', 13', 64'; Pen: So'oialo (2/3) 53', 69' | Report | Try: Lamont 49' m Pen: Laidlaw (4/5) 10', 18', 31', 41' |

Kings Park Stadium, Durban
Attendance: 9,753
Referee: John Lacey (Ireland)

Team details

| FB | 15 | James So'oialo |
| RW | 14 | Alapati Leiua | (substituted off) 79' |
| OC | 13 | Paul Williams (c) |
| IC | 12 | Johnny Leota | (substituted off) 73' |
| LW | 11 | Alesana Tuilagi |
| FH | 10 | Tusi Pisi |
| SH | 9 | Jeremy Su'a |
| N8 | 8 | Taiasina Tuifu'a |
| OF | 7 | Jack Lam |
| BF | 6 | Ofisa Treviranus |
| RL | 5 | Daniel Leo | (substituted off) 54' |
| LL | 4 | Teofilo Paulo |
| TP | 3 | Census Johnston | (substituted off) 54' |
| HK | 2 | Ole Avei | (substituted off) 54' |
| LP | 1 | Logovi'i Mulipola | (substituted off) 77' |
Replacements:
| HK | 16 | Manu Leiatua | (substituted on) 54' |
| PR | 17 | Sakaria Taulafo | (substituted on) 77' |
| PR | 18 | James Johnston | (substituted on) 54' |
| LK | 19 | Fa'atiga Lemalu | (substituted on) 54' |
| SH | 20 | Junior Poluleuligaga |
| CE | 21 | Brando Va'aulu | (substituted on) 79' |
| CE | 22 | Seilala Mapusua | (substituted on) 73' |
| FL | 23 | Alafoti Fa'osiliva |
Coach:
(Samoa) Stephen Betham

| FB | 15 | Greig Tonks |
| RW | 14 | Sean Lamont |
| OC | 13 | Alex Dunbar |
| IC | 12 | Matt Scott |
| LW | 11 | Tim Visser | (substituted off) 69' |
| FH | 10 | Tom Heathcote | (substituted off) 59' |
| SH | 9 | Greig Laidlaw | (substituted off) 69' |
| N8 | 8 | Johnnie Beattie |
| OF | 7 | Kelly Brown (c) | (substituted off) 40' |
| BF | 6 | Alasdair Strokosch |
| RL | 5 | Alastair Kellock | (substituted off) 66' |
| LL | 4 | Grant Gilchrist |
| TP | 3 | Euan Murray | (substituted off) 44' |
| HK | 2 | Pat MacArthur | (substituted off) 11' |
| LP | 1 | Alasdair Dickinson | (substituted off) 66' |
Replacements:
| HK | 16 | Steven Lawrie | (substituted on) 11' |
| PR | 17 | Moray Low | (substituted on) 66' |
| PR | 18 | Geoff Cross | (substituted on) 44' |
| LK | 19 | Jim Hamilton | (substituted on) 66' |
| N8 | 20 | Ryan Wilson | (substituted on) 40' |
| SH | 21 | Henry Pyrgos | (substituted on) 69' |
| FH | 22 | Peter Horne | (substituted on) 59' |
| WG | 23 | Duncan Taylor | (substituted on) 69' |
Coach:
(Australia) Scott Johnson

Man of the Match:
Alesana Tuilagi (Samoa)

Touch judges:
Marius Jonker (South Africa)
Sindile Mayende (South Africa)
Television match official:
Johann Meuwesen (South Africa)

Notes:

- Prop Ryan Grant was originally selected at loosehead prop, but was replaced following a call-up for the 2013 British & Irish Lions tour to Australia.
- This was Samoa's first victory over Scotland.

8 June 2013
17:15 SAST (UTC+02)

| South Africa | 44–10 | Italy |
| Try: Strauss 13' c Engelbrecht 22' c Habana 65'; De Villiers 74' c Basson 77'; Con: Steyn (4/4) 14', 23', 66', 75'; Lambie (1/1) 78'; Pen: Steyn (3/3) 3', 10', 63' | Report | Try: Sgarbi 46' c Con: Di Bernardo (1/1) 48'; Pen: Di Bernardo (1/2) 58' |

Kings Park Stadium, Durban
Attendance: 23,663
Referee: Pascal Gaüzère (France)

Team details

| FB | 15 | Willie le Roux |
| RW | 14 | Bryan Habana | | (substituted off) 71' |
| OC | 13 | JJ Engelbrecht |
| IC | 12 | Jean de Villiers (c) |
| LW | 11 | Bjorn Basson | (yellow card) 42' to 52' |
| FH | 10 | Morné Steyn | | (substituted off) 77' |
| SH | 9 | Jano Vermaak | | (substituted off) 60' |
| N8 | 8 | Pierre Spies |
| OF | 7 | Arno Botha | | | | (substituted off) 72' |
| BF | 6 | Francois Louw | | 54' to 67' |
| RL | 5 | Juandré Kruger | | (substituted off) 58' |
| LL | 4 | Eben Etzebeth |
| TP | 3 | Jannie du Plessis | | (substituted off) 67' |
| HK | 2 | Adriaan Strauss | | (substituted off) 73' |
| LP | 1 | Tendai Mtawarira | | (substituted off) 73' |
Replacements:
| HK | 16 | Chiliboy Ralepelle | | (substituted on) 73' |
| PR | 17 | Trevor Nyakane | | (substituted on) 73' |
| PR | 18 | Coenie Oosthuizen | | (substituted on) 67' |
| LK | 19 | Flip van der Merwe | | (substituted on) 58' |
| FL | 20 | Marcell Coetzee | | (substituted on) 54' | (substituted off) 67' | (substituted on) 72' |
| SH | 21 | Ruan Pienaar | | (substituted on) 60' |
| FH | 22 | Pat Lambie | | (substituted on) 77' |
| CE | 23 | Jan Serfontein | | (substituted on) 71' |
Coach:
(South Africa) Heyneke Meyer

| FB | 15 | Andrea Masi |
| RW | 14 | Giovanbattista Venditti |
| OC | 13 | Luca Morisi | | (substituted off) 68' |
| IC | 12 | Alberto Sgarbi |
| LW | 11 | Luke McLean |
| FH | 10 | Alberto Di Bernardo |
| SH | 9 | Edoardo Gori | | (substituted off) 60' |
| N8 | 8 | Sergio Parisse (c) |
| OF | 7 | Robert Barbieri | | (substituted off) 49' |
| BF | 6 | Alessandro Zanni |
| RL | 5 | Marco Bortolami | (yellow card) 13' to 23' | (substituted off) 66' |
| LL | 4 | Antonio Pavanello |
| TP | 3 | Lorenzo Cittadini | | (substituted off) 49' |
| HK | 2 | Leonardo Ghiraldini | | (substituted off) 45' |
| LP | 1 | Alberto de Marchi | | (substituted off) 45' |
Replacements:
| HK | 16 | Davide Giazzon | | (substituted on) 45' |
| PR | 17 | Matías Agüero | | (substituted on) 45' |
| PR | 18 | Martin Castrogiovanni | | (substituted on) 49' |
| LK | 19 | Valerio Bernabò | | (substituted on) 66' |
| LK | 20 | Joshua Furno | | (substituted on) 49' |
| SH | 21 | Tobias Botes | | (substituted on) 60' |
| FH | 22 | Luciano Orquera |
| WG | 23 | Tommaso Iannone | | (substituted on) 68' |
Coach:
(France) Jacques Brunel

Man of the Match:
Bryan Habana (South Africa)

Touch judges:
Blake Beattie (South Africa)
Neil Hennessy (Wales)
Television match official:
Paul Ackermann (South Africa)

15 June 2013
14:15 SAST (UTC+02)

| Samoa | 39–10 | Italy |
| Try: Williams 20' c Leiua 41' m Leota 53' c Tuifu'a 63' c Va'aulu 72' c Con: Williams (3/4) 21', 53', 64'; Anufe (1/1) 73'; Pen: Williams (2/3) 30', 51' | Report | Try: Penalty try 70' c Con: Di Bernardo (1/1) 70'; Pen: Orquera (1/3) 27' |

Mbombela Stadium, Nelspruit
Attendance: 11,724
Referee: Craig Joubert (South Africa)

Team details

| FB | 15 | Brando Va'aulu |
| RW | 14 | Alapati Leiua | (yellow card) 69' to 79' |
| OC | 13 | Paul Williams (c) |
| IC | 12 | Johnny Leota | | (substituted off) 72' |
| LW | 11 | Alesana Tuilagi |
| FH | 10 | Tusi Pisi | | (substituted off) 57' |
| SH | 9 | Jeremy Su'a | | (substituted off) 64' |
| N8 | 8 | Taiasina Tuifu'a |
| OF | 7 | Jack Lam | | (substituted off) 57' |
| BF | 6 | Ofisa Treviranus |
| RL | 5 | Daniel Leo | | (substituted off) 55' |
| LL | 4 | Filo Paulo |
| TP | 3 | Census Johnston | | (substituted off) 40' |
| HK | 2 | Ole Avei | | (substituted off) 71' |
| LP | 1 | Sakaria Taulafo | | (substituted off) 60' |
Replacements:
| HK | 16 | Ti'i Paulo | | (substituted on) 71' |
| PR | 17 | Logovi'i Mulipola | | (substituted on) 60' |
| PR | 18 | James Johnston | | (substituted on) 40' |
| LK | 19 | Kane Thompson | | (substituted on) 55' |
| SH | 20 | Junior Poluleuligaga | | (substituted on) 64' |
| FH | 21 | Ki Anufe | | (substituted on) 57' |
| CE | 22 | Seilala Mapusua | | (substituted on) 72' |
| FL | 23 | Piula Faasalele | | (substituted on) 57' |
Coach:
(Samoa) Stephen Betham

| FB | 15 | Andrea Masi |
| RW | 14 | Giovanbattista Venditti |
| OC | 13 | Gonzalo Canale |
| IC | 12 | Gonzalo Garcia |
| LW | 11 | Tommaso Iannone | (substituted off) 54' |
| FH | 10 | Luciano Orquera | (substituted off) 43' |
| SH | 9 | Edoardo Gori | (substituted off) 60' |
| N8 | 8 | Sergio Parisse (c) |
| OF | 7 | Mauro Bergamasco | (substituted off) 59' |
| BF | 6 | Alessandro Zanni |
| RL | 5 | Marco Bortolami | (substituted off) 54' |
| LL | 4 | Valerio Bernabò |
| TP | 3 | Martin Castrogiovanni | (substituted off) 59' |
| HK | 2 | Leonardo Ghiraldini | (substituted off) 25' |
| LP | 1 | Alberto de Marchi | (substituted off) 54' |
Replacements:
| HK | 16 | Andrea Manici | (substituted on) 25' |
| PR | 17 | Michele Rizzo | (substituted on) 54' |
| PR | 18 | Lorenzo Cittadini | (substituted on) 59' |
| LK | 19 | Antonio Pavanello | (substituted on) 54' |
| N8 | 20 | Manoa Vosawai | (substituted on) 59' |
| SH | 21 | Tobias Botes | (substituted on) 60' |
| FH | 22 | Alberto Di Bernardo | (substituted on) 43' |
| WG | 23 | Luke McLean | (substituted on) 54' |
Coach:
(France) Jacques Brunel

Man of the Match:
Ole Avei (Samoa)

Touch judges:
John Lacey (Ireland)
Tiaan Jonker (South Africa)
Television match official:
Gerrie Coetzee (South Africa)

15 June 2013
17:15 SAST (UTC+02)

| South Africa | 30–17 | Scotland |
| Try: Penalty try 48' c Engelbrecht 55' c Serfontein 79' c Con: Steyn (2/2) 49', 56'; Lambie (1/1) 80'; Pen: Steyn (2/3) 13', 17'; Lambie (1/1) 74' | Report | Try: Scott 20' c Dunbar 42' c Con: Laidlaw (2/2) 21', 43'; Pen: Laidlaw (1/1) 7' |

Mbombela Stadium, Nelspruit
Attendance: 30,018
Referee: Romain Poite (France)

Team details

| FB | 15 | Willie le Roux |
| RW | 14 | Bryan Habana |
| OC | 13 | JJ Engelbrecht | (substituted off) 69' |
| IC | 12 | Jean de Villiers (c) |
| LW | 11 | Bjorn Basson |
| FH | 10 | Morné Steyn | (substituted off) 69' |
| SH | 9 | Ruan Pienaar | (substituted off) 68' |
| N8 | 8 | Pierre Spies |
| OF | 7 | Arno Botha | (substituted off) 4' |
| BF | 6 | Marcell Coetzee |
| RL | 5 | Juandré Kruger |
| LL | 4 | Eben Etzebeth | (substituted off) 66' |
| TP | 3 | Jannie du Plessis | (substituted off) 76' |
| HK | 2 | Adriaan Strauss | (substituted off) 66' |
| LP | 1 | Tendai Mtawarira | (substituted off) 66' |
Replacements:
| HK | 16 | Bismarck du Plessis | (substituted on) 66' |
| PR | 17 | Trevor Nyakane | (substituted on) 76' |
| PR | 18 | Coenie Oosthuizen | (substituted on) 66' |
| LK | 19 | Flip van der Merwe | (substituted on) 66' |
| FL | 20 | Siya Kolisi | (substituted on) 4' |
| SH | 21 | Piet van Zyl | (substituted on) 68' |
| FH | 22 | Pat Lambie | (substituted on) 69' |
| CE | 23 | Jan Serfontein | (substituted on) 69' |
Coach:
(South Africa) Heyneke Meyer

| FB | 15 | Peter Murchie | | (substituted off) 76' |
| RW | 14 | Tommy Seymour |
| OC | 13 | Alex Dunbar |
| IC | 12 | Matt Scott |
| LW | 11 | Sean Lamont |
| FH | 10 | Ruaridh Jackson | | (substituted off) 32' |
| SH | 9 | Greig Laidlaw (c) |
| N8 | 8 | Johnnie Beattie |
| OF | 7 | Ryan Wilson | | (substituted off) 37' |
| BF | 6 | Alasdair Strokosch |
| RL | 5 | Jim Hamilton | (yellow card) 51' to 61' | (substituted off) 61' |
| LL | 4 | Tim Swinson |
| TP | 3 | Euan Murray |
| HK | 2 | Scott Lawson |
| LP | 1 | Alasdair Dickinson | | (substituted off) 64' |
Replacements:
| HK | 16 | Fraser Brown |
| PR | 17 | Jon Welsh | | (substituted on) 64' |
| PR | 18 | Moray Low |
| LK | 19 | Alastair Kellock | | (substituted on) 61' |
| FL | 20 | David Denton | | (substituted on) 37' |
| SH | 21 | Henry Pyrgos | | | (substituted on) 43' |
| FH | 22 | Peter Horne | | (substituted on) 32' | (substituted off) 43' |
| WG | 23 | Duncan Taylor | | (substituted on) 76' |
Coach:
(Australia) Scott Johnson

Man of the Match:
Siya Kolisi (South Africa)

Touch judges:
Pascal Gaüzère (France)
Neil Hennessy (Wales)
Television match official:
Gerrie Coetzee (South Africa)

Notes:

- Siya Kolisi (South Africa) made his international debut.

Third-place play-off

22 June 2013
14:15 SAST (UTC+02)

| Scotland | 30–29 | Italy |
| Try: Scott 6' c Lamont 15' c Strokosch 80+1' c Con: Laidlaw (3/3) 6', 16', 80+1'; Pen: Laidlaw (3/3) 20', 36', 41' | Report | Try: Sarto 1' c Penalty try 31' c Con: Di Bernardo (2/2) 2', 32'; Pen: Di Bernardo (5/6) 13', 39', 43', 57', 66' |

Loftus Versfeld Stadium, Pretoria
Attendance: 10,109
Referee: Leighton Hodges (Wales)

Team details

| FB | 15 | Peter Murchie | (substituted off) 58' |
| RW | 14 | Tommy Seymour | (substituted off) 43' |
| OC | 13 | Alex Dunbar |
| IC | 12 | Matt Scott |
| LW | 11 | Sean Lamont |
| FH | 10 | Tom Heathcote | (substituted off) 48' |
| SH | 9 | Greig Laidlaw (c) |
| N8 | 8 | Johnnie Beattie | (substituted off) 60' |
| OF | 7 | Alasdair Strokosch |
| BF | 6 | David Denton |
| RL | 5 | Alastair Kellock |
| LL | 4 | Tim Swinson | (substituted off) 58' |
| TP | 3 | Euan Murray | (substituted off) 72' |
| HK | 2 | Scott Lawson | (substituted off) 72' |
| LP | 1 | Alasdair Dickinson | (substituted off) 49' |
Replacements:
| HK | 16 | Fraser Brown | (substituted on) 72' |
| PR | 17 | Moray Low | (substituted on) 49' |
| PR | 18 | Jon Welsh | (substituted on) 72' |
| LK | 19 | Grant Gilchrist | (substituted on) 58' |
| FL | 20 | Rob Harley | (substituted on) 60' |
| SH | 21 | Henry Pyrgos | (substituted on) 48' |
| WG | 22 | Duncan Taylor | (substituted on) 58' |
| WG | 23 | Tim Visser | (substituted on) 43' |
Coach:
(Australia) Scott Johnson

| FB | 15 | Andrea Masi |
| RW | 14 | Leonardo Sarto | (substituted off) 60' |
| OC | 13 | Luca Morisi | (substituted off) 52' |
| IC | 12 | Alberto Sgarbi |
| LW | 11 | Giovanbattista Venditti |
| FH | 10 | Alberto Di Bernardo |
| SH | 9 | Tobias Botes | (substituted off) 69' |
| N8 | 8 | Sergio Parisse (c) |
| OF | 7 | Robert Barbieri |
| BF | 6 | Joshua Furno |
| RL | 5 | Marco Bortolami | (substituted off) 48' |
| LL | 4 | Leandro Cedaro | (substituted off) 52' |
| TP | 3 | Martin Castrogiovanni | (substituted off) 48' |
| HK | 2 | Davide Giazzon | (substituted off) 47' |
| LP | 1 | Matías Agüero | (substituted off) 47' |
Replacements:
| HK | 16 | Leonardo Ghiraldini | (substituted on) 47' |
| PR | 17 | Alberto De Marchi | (substituted on) 47' |
| PR | 18 | Lorenzo Cittadini | (substituted on) 48' |
| LK | 19 | Antonio Pavanello | (substituted on) 52' |
| FL | 20 | Alessandro Zanni | (substituted on) 48' |
| SH | 21 | Alberto Chillon | (substituted on) 69' |
| CE | 22 | Gonzalo Canale | (substituted on) 52' |
| WG | 23 | Luke McLean | (substituted on) 60' |
Coach:
(France) Jacques Brunel

Man of the Match:
Greig Laidlaw (Scotland)

Touch judges:
Lourens van der Merwe (South Africa)
Cobus Wessels (South Africa)
Television match official:
Deon van Blommestein (South Africa)

Final

22 June 2013
17:15 SAST (UTC+02)

| South Africa | 56–23 | Samoa |
| Try: Habana (2) 17' c, 58' m Louw (2) 24' c, 76' c Engelbrecht 33' m Basson 38' c Steyn 62' m Nyakane 79' c Con: Steyn (3/6) 18', 25', 39'; Lambie (2/2) 76', 80'; Pen: Steyn (2/3) 2', 28' | Report | Try: Paulo 46' c Poluleuligaga 69' c Con: So'oialo (1/1) 47'; Williams (1/1) 70'; Pen: So'oialo (3/3) 10', 14', 31' |

Loftus Versfeld Stadium, Pretoria
Attendance: 34,000
Referee: Pascal Gaüzère (France)

Team details

| FB | 15 | Willie le Roux |
| RW | 14 | Bryan Habana | (yellow card) 69' to 79' |
| OC | 13 | JJ Engelbrecht |
| IC | 12 | Jean de Villiers (c) | | (substituted off) 71' |
| LW | 11 | Bjorn Basson |
| FH | 10 | Morné Steyn | | (substituted off) 64' |
| SH | 9 | Ruan Pienaar | | (substituted off) 66' |
| N8 | 8 | Pierre Spies | | (substituted off) 40' |
| OF | 7 | Willem Alberts |
| BF | 6 | Francois Louw |
| RL | 5 | Flip van der Merwe | | | | | (substituted off) 71' |
| LL | 4 | Eben Etzebeth |
| TP | 3 | Jannie du Plessis | | (substituted off) 66' |
| HK | 2 | Adriaan Strauss | | (substituted off) 59' |
| LP | 1 | Tendai Mtawarira | | (substituted off) 56' |
Replacements:
| HK | 16 | Bismarck du Plessis | | (substituted on) 59' |
| PR | 17 | Trevor Nyakane | | (substituted on) 66' |
| PR | 18 | Coenie Oosthuizen | | (substituted on) 56' |
| LK | 19 | Juandré Kruger | | | (substituted on) 47' | (substituted off) 52' | (substituted on) 71' |
| FL | 20 | Siya Kolisi | | (substituted on) 40' | 47' to 52' |
| SH | 21 | Piet van Zyl | | (substituted on) 66' |
| FH | 22 | Pat Lambie | | (substituted on) 64' |
| CE | 23 | Jan Serfontein | | (substituted on) 71' |
Coach:
(South Africa) Heyneke Meyer

| FB | 15 | James So'oialo | | | | (substituted off) 59' |
| RW | 14 | Alapati Leiua | | (substituted off) 57' |
| OC | 13 | Paul Williams (c) |
| IC | 12 | Johnny Leota | | 21' to 26' |
| LW | 11 | Alesana Tuilagi | (red card) 57' |
| FH | 10 | Tusi Pisi |
| SH | 9 | Jeremy Su'a | | (substituted off) 65' |
| N8 | 8 | Taiasina Tuifu'a |
| OF | 7 | Jack Lam |
| BF | 6 | Ofisa Treviranus | | (substituted off) 66' |
| RL | 5 | Daniel Leo |
| LL | 4 | Filo Paulo | | (substituted off) 53' |
| TP | 3 | Logovi'i Mulipola | (yellow card) 27' to 37' | (substituted off) 66' |
| HK | 2 | Ole Avei | | (substituted off) 53' |
| LP | 1 | Sakaria Taulafo | | (substituted off) 56' |
Replacements:
| HK | 16 | Ti'i Paulo | | (substituted on) 53' |
| PR | 17 | Census Johnston | | (substituted on) 56' |
| PR | 18 | James Johnston | | (substituted on) 66' |
| LK | 19 | Kane Thompson | | (substituted on) 53' |
| SH | 20 | Junior Poluleuligaga | | (substituted on) 65' |
| CE | 21 | Brando Va'aulu | | (substituted on) 57' |
| CE | 22 | Seilala Mapusua | | (substituted on) 21' | (substituted off) 26' | (substituted on) 59' |
| N8 | 23 | Alafoti Fa'osiliva | | (substituted on) 66' |
Coach:
(Samoa) Stephen Betham

Man of the Match:
Francois Louw (South Africa)

Touch judges:
Nigel Hennessy (Wales)
JP Doyle (England)
Television match official:
Deon van Blommestein (South Africa)

== See also ==
- Mid-year rugby union test series
- 2013 end-of-year rugby union tests
- 2013 British & Irish Lions tour to Australia
- 2013 Africa Cup
- 2013 Asian Five Nations
- 2013 IRB Pacific Nations Cup
- 2013 IRB Nations Cup
- 2013 IRB Tbilisi Cup
