= 2013 England rugby union tour of Argentina =

Rugby union tour of Argentina by England in 2013

- Coach: Stuart Lancaster
- Tour captain: Tom Wood
- Top point scorer: Freddie Burns (51)
- Top try scorer: Billy Vunipola (4)
- Top test point scorer: Freddie Burns (31)
- Top test try scorer: Marland Yarde (2)
Summary
P	W	D	L
Total
4	4	0	0
Test match
2	2	0	0
Opponent
P	W	D	L
Argentina
2	2	0	0

Tour chronology
- ← South Africa 2012 New Zealand 2014 →

In June 2013, England played a two-test series against Argentina as part of the 2013 mid-year rugby test series. This series was part of the second year of the global rugby calendar established by the International Rugby Board, which runs through to 2019.

England played the Pumas over a two-week period, playing in Estadio Padre Ernesto Martearena in Salta (8 June) and playing at Estadio José Amalfitani in the capital city of Buenos Aires (15 June). The first test was their first encounter since England's 13–9 victory over Argentina during the 2011 Rugby World Cup, and was the first time they have met in Argentina since 2009, the last time Argentina beat England. England won both matches of the series, completing their first series victory in Argentina since the 1981 England rugby union tour of Argentina, and winning both matches of a series in Argentina for the first time.

Ahead of the test series, England played their annual uncapped fixture against the Barbarians at Twickenham, and a fixture against the South American XV side, which was made up of representatives from Argentina, Brazil, Chile and Uruguay.

== Fixtures ==
Date	Venue	Home	Score	Away
26 May 2013	Twickenham Stadium, London	England	40–12	Barbarians
2 June 2013	Estadio Charrúa, Montevideo	Sudamérica XV	21–41	England
8 June 2013	Estadio Padre Ernesto Martearena, Salta	Argentina	3–32	England
15 June 2013	Estadio José Amalfitani, Buenos Aires	Argentina	26–51	England

== Squads ==
=== England ===
England's 32-man squad for fixtures against the Barbarians and the two-test tour to Argentina plus a mid-week match against South American XV. Full-back Alex Goode and uncapped centre Joel Tomkins withdrew from the squad due to injury. They were replaced by uncapped players Stephen Myler and Luther Burrell.

Ed Slater and Calum Clark was ruled out of the tour due to injury and Kearnan Myall was added to the squad for the tour.

Haydn Thomas featured in the squad to face the Barbarians.

Alex Corbisiero left the squad ahead of the first test as he was called up for the British and Irish Lions. Corbisiero was not replaced.

- Head coach: (England) Stuart Lancaster
- Caps and ages are to Barbarians match (26 May 2013)

Note: Flags indicate national union for the club/province as defined by World Rugby.

Player	Position	Date of birth (age)	Caps	Club/province
Rob Buchanan	Hooker	13 May 1991 (aged 22)	0	(England) Harlequins
David Paice	Hooker	24 November 1983 (aged 29)	6	(England) London Irish
Rob Webber	Hooker	1 August 1986 (aged 26)	3	(England) Bath
Alex Corbisiero	Prop	30 August 1988 (aged 24)	18	(England) London Irish
Paul Doran-Jones	Prop	2 May 1985 (aged 28)	4	(England) Northampton Saints
Joe Marler	Prop	7 July 1990 (aged 22)	10	(England) Harlequins
Henry Thomas	Prop	30 October 1991 (aged 21)	0	(England) Sale Sharks
David Wilson	Prop	9 April 1985 (aged 28)	26	(England) Bath
Dave Attwood	Lock	5 April 1987 (aged 26)	2	(England) Bath
Joe Launchbury	Lock	12 April 1991 (aged 22)	9	(England) London Wasps
Courtney Lawes	Lock	23 February 1989 (aged 24)	20	(England) Northampton Saints
Kearnan Myall	Lock	15 December 1986 (aged 26)	0	(England) Sale Sharks
Tom Johnson	Flanker	16 July 1982 (aged 30)	5	(England) Exeter Chiefs
Matt Kvesic	Flanker	14 April 1992 (aged 21)	0	(England) Worcester Warriors
Tom Wood (c)	Flanker	3 November 1986 (aged 26)	18	(England) Northampton Saints
Ben Morgan	Number 8	18 February 1989 (aged 24)	10	(England) Gloucester
Billy Vunipola	Number 8	3 November 1992 (aged 20)	0	(England) London Wasps
Lee Dickson	Scrum-half	29 March 1985 (aged 28)	7	(England) Northampton Saints
Haydn Thomas	Scrum-half	17 September 1982 (aged 30)	0	(England) Exeter Chiefs
Richard Wigglesworth	Scrum-half	9 June 1983 (aged 29)	12	(England) Saracens
Freddie Burns	Fly-half	13 May 1990 (aged 23)	1	(England) Gloucester
Stephen Myler	Fly-half	21 July 1984 (aged 28)	0	(England) Northampton Saints
Luther Burrell	Centre	6 December 1987 (aged 25)	0	(England) Northampton Saints
Kyle Eastmond	Centre	17 July 1989 (aged 23)	0	(England) Bath
Jonathan Joseph	Centre	21 June 1991 (aged 21)	4	(England) London Irish
Billy Twelvetrees	Centre	15 November 1988 (aged 24)	4	(England) Gloucester
Jonny May	Wing	1 April 1990 (aged 23)	0	(England) Gloucester
David Strettle	Wing	23 July 1983 (aged 29)	13	(England) Saracens
Christian Wade	Wing	15 May 1991 (aged 22)	0	(England) London Wasps
Marland Yarde	Wing	20 April 1992 (aged 21)	0	(England) London Irish
Mike Brown	Fullback	4 September 1985 (aged 27)	16	(England) Harlequins
Ben Foden	Fullback	22 July 1985 (aged 27)	30	(England) Northampton Saints

=== Argentina ===
Argentina 28-man squad for the 2013 England rugby union tour of Argentina and single test against Georgia

- Head coach: (Argentina) Santiago Phelan
- Caps and ages are to Barbarians match (26 May 2013)

Note: Flags indicate national union for the club/province as defined by World Rugby.

Player	Position	Date of birth (age)	Caps	Club/province
Martín García Veiga	Hooker	20 June 1986 (aged 26)	3	(Argentina) Buenos Aires
Mauricio Guidone	Hooker	28 January 1988 (aged 25)	7	(Argentina) La Plata
Bruno Postiglioni	Hooker	8 April 1987 (aged 26)	7	(Argentina) La Plata
Maximiliano Bustos	Prop	2 April 1986 (aged 27)	1	(France) Montpellier
Francisco Gómez Kodela	Prop	7 July 1985 (aged 27)	8	(France) Biarritz
Pablo Henn	Prop	15 July 1982 (aged 30)	8	(France) CA Brive
Guillermo Roan	Prop	18 June 1988 (aged 24)	4	(France) Cavalieri Prato
Julio Farías Cabello	Lock	19 September 1978 (aged 34)	19	(England) London Welsh
Mariano Galarza	Lock	11 December 1986 (aged 26)	8	(Argentina) La Plata Uni.
Esteban Lozada	Lock	8 January 1982 (aged 31)	19	(France) Agen
Tomás Vallejos	Lock	16 October 1984 (aged 28)	4	(Argentina) Pampas XV
Rodrigo Báez	Flanker	8 February 1989 (aged 24)	5	(Argentina) Liceo
Tomás de la Vega	Flanker	28 September 1990 (aged 22)	6	(Argentina) CUBA
Tomás Leonardi	Flanker	1 July 1987 (aged 25)	15	(South Africa) Southern Kings
Benjamín Macome	Number 8	10 January 1986 (aged 27)	8	(Argentina) Tucumán
Tomás Cubelli	Scrum-half	12 June 1989 (aged 23)	11	(Argentina) Belgrano
Martín Landajo	Scrum-half	14 June 1988 (aged 24)	17	(Argentina) C.A.S.I.
Nicolás Vergallo	Scrum-half	20 April 1983 (aged 30)	31	(South Africa) Southern Kings
Felipe Contepomi (c)	Fly-half	20 August 1977 (aged 35)	79	(France) Stade Français
Benjamín Madero	Fly-half	18 June 1988 (aged 24)	2	(Argentina) San Isidro
Gabriel Ascárate	Centre	20 October 1987 (aged 25)	5	(France) Carcassonne
Matías Orlando	Centre	14 November 1991 (aged 21)	3	(Argentina) Huirapuca
Gonzalo Tiesi	Centre	24 April 1985 (aged 28)	33	(England) London Welsh
Benjamín Urdapilleta	Centre	11 March 1986 (aged 27)	8	(France) Oyonnax
Belisario Agulla	Wing	20 May 1988 (aged 25)	8	(France) Agen
Manuel Montero	Wing	20 November 1991 (aged 21)	7	(Argentina) Club Pucará
Martín Bustos Moyano	Fullback	12 July 1985 (aged 27)	1	(France) Montpellier
Tomás Carrió	Fullback	10 March 1989 (aged 24)	3	(Argentina) Duendes

== Matches ==
=== Warm-up match ===
26 May 2013
13:00 BST (UTC+01)

England	40–12	Barbarians
Try: Burns 1' c Yarde 43' c Eastmond 55' m Wade 61' c Twelvetrees 66' m Con: Burns (3/4) 1', 44', 62'; Pen: Burns (3/3) 4', 11', 24'	Report	Try: Brits 70' m Daly 77' c Con: Evans (1/2) 78'

Twickenham Stadium, London
Attendance: 60,601
Referee: Leighton Hodges (Wales)

Team details

England	Barbarians

FB	15	Mike Brown	(substituted off) 52'
RW	14	Christian Wade
OC	13	Jonathan Joseph
IC	12	Billy Twelvetrees
LW	11	Marland Yarde
FH	10	Freddie Burns	(substituted off) 64'
SH	9	Richard Wigglesworth	(substituted off) 47'
N8	8	Ben Morgan	(substituted off) 47'
OF	7	Matt Kvesic
BF	6	Tom Johnson
RL	5	Dave Attwood	(substituted off) 47'
LL	4	Joe Launchbury
TP	3	David Wilson	(substituted off) 47'
HK	2	Rob Webber (c)	(substituted off) 60'
LP	1	Alex Corbisiero	(substituted off) 57'
Replacements:
HK	16	David Paice	(substituted in) 60'
PR	17	Joe Marler	(substituted in) 57'
PR	18	Henry Thomas	(substituted in) 47'
LK	19	Kearnan Myall	(substituted in) 47'
N8	20	Billy Vunipola	(substituted in) 47'
SH	21	Haydn Thomas	(substituted in) 47'
CE	22	Kyle Eastmond	(substituted in) 52'
WG	23	Jonny May	(substituted in) 64'
Coach:
(England) Stuart Lancaster

FB	15	(England) Elliot Daly
RW	14	(Fiji) Timoci Nagusa	(substituted off) 60'
OC	13	(New Zealand) Casey Laulala
IC	12	(England) Mike Tindall (c)
LW	11	(United States) Takudzwa Ngwenya
FH	10	(Wales) James Hook	(substituted off) 64'
SH	9	(Wales) Dwayne Peel	(substituted off) 50'
N8	8	(France) Imanol Harinordoquy	(substituted off) 60'
OF	7	(New Zealand) Jonathan Poff
BF	6	(Italy) Alessandro Zanni
RL	5	(South Africa) Marco Wentzel
LL	4	(Scotland) Jim Hamilton	(substituted off) 57'
TP	3	(Samoa) James Johnston	(substituted off) 64'
HK	2	(Wales) Matthew Rees	(substituted off) 46'
LP	1	(Italy) Andrea Lo Cicero	(substituted off) 46'
Replacements:
HK	16	(South Africa) Schalk Brits	(substituted in) 46'
PR	17	(Wales) Duncan Jones	(substituted in) 46'
PR	18	(Wales) Paul James	(substituted in) 64'
LK	19	(Australia) Dean Mumm	(substituted in) 57'
FL	20	(England) Sam Jones	(substituted in) 60'
SH	21	(France) Dimitri Yachvili	(substituted in) 50'
FH	22	(New Zealand) Nick Evans	(substituted in) 64'
WG	23	(Hong Kong) Rowan Varty	(substituted in) 60'
Coach:
(Wales) Dai Young

Man of the Match:
(England) Joe Launchbury

Touch judges:
Nigel Owens (Wales)
Paul Dix (England)
Television match official:
David Grashoff (England)

=== South American XV ===
2 June 2013
15:30 UYT (UTC-3)

Sudamérica XV	21–41	England
Try: Penalty try 17' c Sansot 43' c Magno 68' c Con: Madero (3/3) 18', 44', 69'	Report	Try: Foden (2) 20' m, 47' m Vunipola (3) 29' c, 32' c, 35 m Wood 39' c Doran-Jones 58' m Con: Myler (3/7) 30', 33', 40'

Estadio Charrúa, Montevideo
Referee: Joaquín Montes (Uruguay

Team details

South American XV	England

FB	15	(Argentina) Tomás Carrió
RW	14	(Argentina) Belisario Agulla
OC	13	(Argentina) Francisco Sansot		(substituted off) 61'
IC	12	(Argentina) Juan Pablo Socino
LW	11	(Uruguay) Leandro Leivas		(substituted off) 67'
FH	10	(Argentina) Benjamín Madero
SH	9	(Argentina) Tomás Cubelli (c)		(substituted off) 70'
N8	8	(Argentina) Antonio Ahualli		(substituted off) 65'
OF	7	(Argentina) Javier Ortega Desio
BF	6	(Argentina) Tomás de la Vega
RL	5	(Chile) Pablo Huete			(substituted off) 54'	(substituted in) 63'
LL	4	(Argentina) César Fruttero		(substituted off) 63'
TP	3	(Uruguay) Mario Sagario		(substituted off) 49'	(substituted in) 54'	(substituted off) 63'
HK	2	(Uruguay) Arturo Ávalo		(substituted off) 49'
LP	1	(Argentina) Bruno Postiglioni		(substituted off) 49'
Replacements:
PR	16	(Uruguay) Alejo Corral		(substituted in) 49'
PR	17	(Uruguay) Oscar Durán	(yellow card) 53' to 63'	(substituted in) 49'
HK	18	(Uruguay) Nicolás Klappenbach		(substituted in) 49'
FL	19	(Uruguay) Diego Magno		(substituted in) 63'
FL	20	(Uruguay) Juan Gaminara		(substituted in) 65'
SH	21	(Uruguay) Agustín Ormaechea		(substituted in) 70'
CE	22	(Brazil) Moisés Duque		(substituted in) 61'
CE	23	(Uruguay) Santiago Gibernau		(substituted in) 67'
Coach:
(Uruguay) Pablo Lemoine

FB	15	Ben Foden
RW	14	Jonny May	(yellow card) 18' to 28'
OC	13	Luther Burrell
IC	12	Kyle Eastmond		(substituted off) 60'
LW	11	David Strettle
FH	10	Stephen Myler
SH	9	Richard Wigglesworth		(substituted off) 51'
N8	8	Billy Vunipola			(substituted off) 73'
OF	7	Tom Johnson
BF	6	Tom Wood (c)		(substituted off) 49'
RL	5	Kearnan Myall
LL	4	Courtney Lawes		(substituted off) 60'
TP	3	Henry Thomas		(substituted off) 49'
HK	2	David Paice		(substituted off) 49'
LP	1	Joe Marler		(substituted off) 64'	(substituted in) 73'
Replacements:
HK	16	Rob Buchanan		(substituted in) 49'
PR	17	Alex Corbisiero	(yellow card) 71' to end'	(substituted in) 64'
PR	18	Paul Doran-Jones		(substituted in) 49'
LK	19	Dave Attwood		(substituted in) 60'
FL	20	Matt Kvesic		(substituted in) 49'
SH	21	Lee Dickson		(substituted in) 51'
FH	22	Freddie Burns
CE	23	Jonathan Joseph		(substituted in) 60'
Coach:
(England) Stuart Lancaster

Touch judges:
Federico Anselmi (Argentina)
Carlos Poggi (Argentina)

=== First test ===
8 June 2013
16:10 ART (UTC-03)

Argentina	3–32	England
Pen: Moyano (1/4) 40'	Report	Try: Strettle 17' m Twelvetrees 25' c Morgan 31' c Vunipola 80' c Con: Burns (3/4) 26', 32', 80'; Pen: Burns (2/2) 8', 11'

Estadio Padre Ernesto Martearena, Salta
Attendance: 20,000
Referee: Chris Pollock (New Zealand)

Team details

Argentina	England

FB	15	Martín Bustos Moyano
RW	14	Matías Orlando	(substituted off) 58'
OC	13	Gonzalo Tiesi
IC	12	Felipe Contepomi (c)
LW	11	Manuel Montero
FH	10	Benjamín Urdapilleta	(substituted off) 58'
SH	9	Martín Landajo	(substituted off) 67'
N8	8	Tomás Leonardi
OF	7	Benjamín Macome
BF	6	Julio Farías Cabello	(substituted off) 71'
RL	5	Mariano Galarza
LL	4	Esteban Lozada	(substituted off) 61'
TP	3	Maximiliano Bustos	(substituted off) 66'
HK	2	Martín García Veiga	(substituted off) 54'
LP	1	Pablo Henn	(substituted off) 50'
Replacements:
HK	16	Mauricio Guidone	(substituted in) 54'
PR	17	Guillermo Roan	(substituted in) 50'
PR	18	Francisco Gómez Kodela	(substituted in) 66'
LK	19	Tomás Vallejos	(substituted in) 61'
FL	20	Tomás de la Vega	(substituted in) 71'
SH	21	Nicolás Vergallo	(substituted in) 67'
CE	22	Gabriel Ascárate	(substituted in) 58'
WG	23	Belisario Agulla	(substituted in) 58'
Coach:
(Argentina) Santiago Phelan

FB	15	Mike Brown		(substituted off) 74'
RW	14	Christian Wade
OC	13	Jonathan Joseph		(substituted off) 65'
IC	12	Billy Twelvetrees
LW	11	David Strettle
FH	10	Freddie Burns
SH	9	Lee Dickson		(substituted off) 53'
N8	8	Ben Morgan		(substituted off) 67'
OF	7	Matt Kvesic
BF	6	Tom Wood (c)
RL	5	Dave Attwood		(substituted off) 53'
LL	4	Joe Launchbury
TP	3	David Wilson		(substituted off) 74'
HK	2	Rob Webber		(substituted off) 67'
LP	1	Joe Marler		(substituted off) 74'
Replacements:
HK	16	David Paice		(substituted in) 67'
PR	17	Henry Thomas		(substituted in) 74'
PR	18	Paul Doran-Jones		(substituted in) 74'
LK	19	Courtney Lawes	(yellow card) 69' to 79'	(substituted in) 53'
N8	20	Billy Vunipola		(substituted in) 67'
SH	21	Richard Wigglesworth		(substituted in) 53'
FH	22	Kyle Eastmond		(substituted in) 65'
FB	23	Ben Foden		(substituted in) 74'
Coach:
(England) Stuart Lancaster

Man of the Match:
Ben Morgan (England)

Touch judges:
Nigel Owens (Wales)
Christie du Preez (South Africa)
Television match official:
Shaun Veldsman (South Africa)

=== Second test ===
15 June 2013
16:10 ART (UTC-03)

Argentina	26–51	England
Try: Montero 49' c Leonardi 69' c Con: Moyano (2/2) 50', 70'; Pen: Moyano (4/4) 3', 10', 21', 26'	Report	Try: Penalty try (2) 30' c, 40' c Burns 36' m Webber 53' m Yarde (2) 57' c, 73' c Eastmond 64' c Con: Burns (4/6) 30', 40', 58', 65'; Myler (1/1) 74'; Pen: Burns (2/3) 7', 24'

Estadio José Amalfitani, Buenos Aires
Referee: Nigel Owens (Wales)

Team details

Argentina	England

FB	15	Martín Bustos Moyano	(yellow card) 39' to 49'
RW	14	Belisario Agulla
OC	13	Gonzalo Tiesi
IC	12	Gabriel Ascárate		(substituted off) 72'
LW	11	Manuel Montero		(substituted off) 66'
FH	10	Felipe Contepomi (c)
SH	9	Nicolás Vergallo		(substituted off) 59'
N8	8	Tomás Leonardi
OF	7	Benjamín Macome
BF	6	Rodrigo Baez		(substituted off) 59'
RL	5	Mariano Galarza
LL	4	Julio Farías Cabello		(substituted off) 52'
TP	3	Maximiliano Bustos		(substituted off) 66'
HK	2	Martín García Veiga
LP	1	Guillermo Roan		(substituted off) 40'
Replacements:
PR	16	Mauricio Guidone			(substituted in) 55'
PR	17	Pablo Henn		(substituted in) 40'	(substituted off) 55'
PR	18	Francisco Gómez Kodela		(substituted in) 66'
LK	19	Esteban Lozada		(substituted in) 52'
FL	20	Tomás de la Vega		(substituted in) 59'
SH	21	Tomás Cubelli		(substituted in) 59'
FH	22	Benjamín Madero		(substituted in) 72'
CE	23	Matías Orlando		(substituted in) 66'
Coach:
(Argentina) Santiago Phelan

FB	15	Mike Brown	(substituted off) 59'
RW	14	Jonny May
OC	13	Jonathan Joseph
IC	12	Kyle Eastmond
LW	11	Marland Yarde
FH	10	Freddie Burns	(substituted off) 65'
SH	9	Lee Dickson	(substituted off) 55'
N8	8	Ben Morgan	(substituted off) 59'
OF	7	Matt Kvesic
BF	6	Tom Wood (c)
RL	5	Dave Attwood	(substituted off) 50'
LL	4	Joe Launchbury
TP	3	David Wilson	(substituted off) 75'
HK	2	Rob Webber	(substituted off) 61'
LP	1	Joe Marler	(substituted off) 65'
Replacements:
HK	16	David Paice	(substituted in) 61'
PR	17	Paul Doran-Jones	(substituted in) 65'
PR	18	Henry Thomas	(substituted in) 75'
LK	19	Courtney Lawes	(substituted in) 50'
N8	20	Billy Vunipola	(substituted in) 59'
SH	21	Richard Wigglesworth	(substituted in) 55'
FH	22	Stephen Myler	(substituted in) 65'
FB	23	Ben Foden	(substituted in) 59'
Coach:
(England) Stuart Lancaster

Man of the Match:
Marland Yarde (England)

Touch judges:
Marius Jonker (South Africa)
Christie du Preez (South Africa)
Television match official:
Shaun Veldsman (South Africa)

Notes:

- Winger Christian wade was named in the starting XV, but was withdrawn following a British and Irish Lions call-up
- First test series win for England in Argentina since 1981

== See also ==
- 2013 mid-year rugby test series
- History of rugby union matches between Argentina and England
