= David Paice =

England international rugby union player

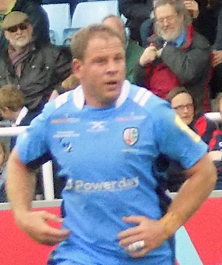
- Born: David James Paice; 24 November 1983 (age 42) Darwin, Northern Territory, Australia
- Height: 1.85 m (6 ft 1 in)
- Weight: 103 kg (16 st 3 lb)
- School: Brisbane State High School

Rugby union career
- Position: Hooker
Youth career
- Souths RFC, Brisbane
Senior career
Years	Team	Apps	(Points)
2003–2018	London Irish	288	(145)
- Correct as of 5 May 2018
International career
Years	Team	Apps	(Points)
2006–2008	England Saxons	9	(5)
2008–2013	England	8	(0)
- Correct as of 15 June 2013

David James Paice (born 24 November 1983) is a former rugby union player. A hooker, he was a one-club man for London Irish and represented England eight times.

== Career ==
Paice was born in Darwin and raised in Brisbane. In 2003 during a gap year, he joined the academy of London Irish and made his club debut that same year. Paice was a member of the side that were defeated by Gloucester in extra time of the 2006 European Challenge Cup final. He also started in their loss against Toulouse at the semi-final stage of the 2007–08 Heineken Cup. The following season saw Irish finish as runners up to Leicester Tigers in the 2009 Premiership final.

Paice started for the England Saxons side that defeated New Zealand Maori to win the 2007 Churchill Cup. On 1 February 2008 he started in a victory over Ireland A. Paice received his first call up to the senior England squad for their 2008 tour of New Zealand. On 14 June 2008 he made his debut in the opening test coming off the bench in a defeat at Eden Park.

In November 2012, after a four-year absence, Paice returned to the England squad and played in all of their autumn internationals including a win over New Zealand. His last caps came on their 2013 tour of Argentina.

Following relegation in 2016 Paice led London Irish to promotion during the 2016–17 season. During that campaign he made his 250th appearance for the club and often captained the team on the field. In 2018 Paice retired after fifteen years at London Irish and returned to his native Australia.

== Honours ==
England Saxons

- Churchill Cup: 2007

London Irish

- RFU Championship: 2016–17
- Premiership runner up: 2008–09
- EPCR Challenge Cup runner up: 2005–06
