= Henry Thomas (rugby union) =

English rugby union player (born 1991)

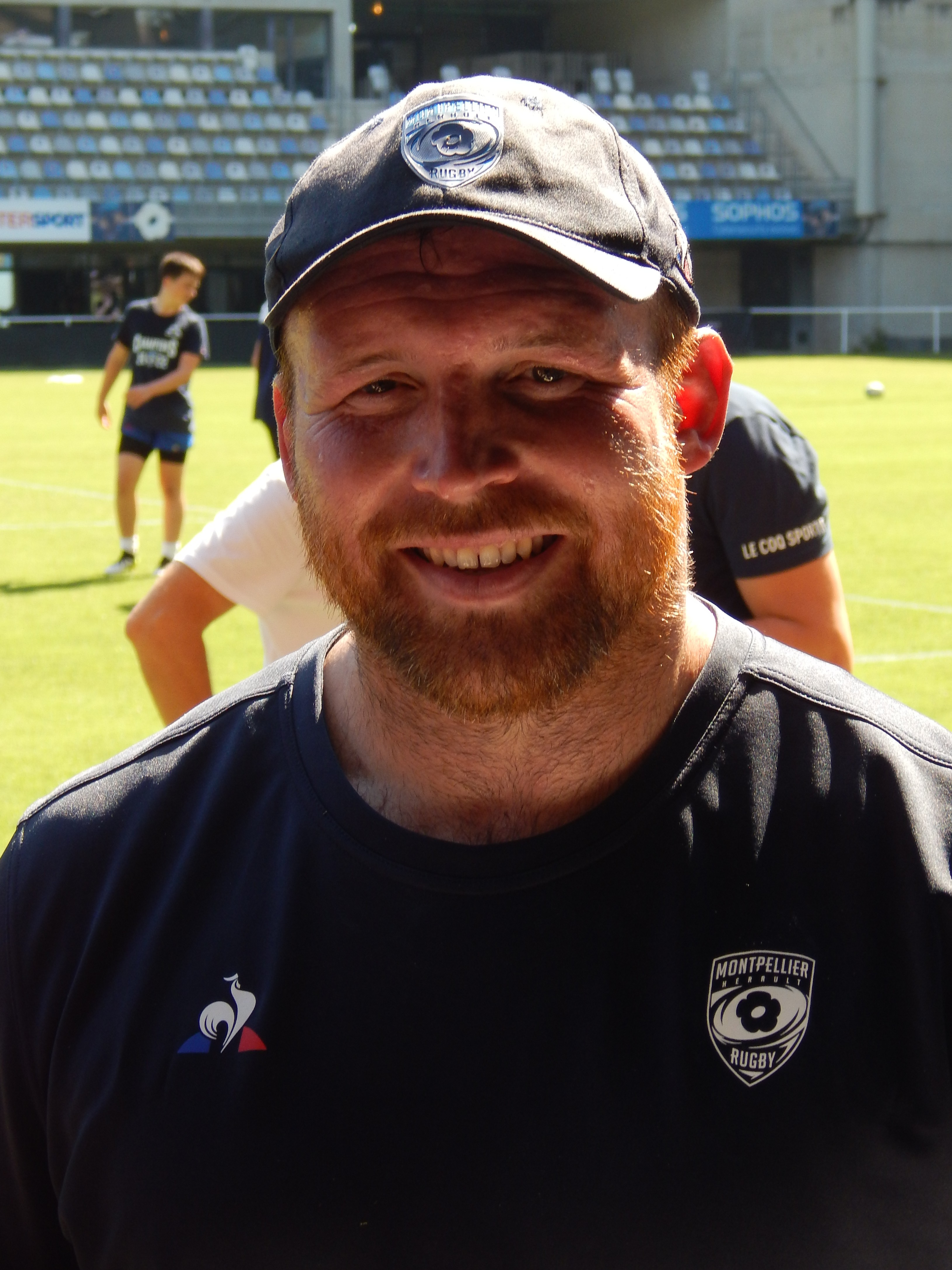
- Thomas, Montpellier, 2022
- Born: Henry Morgan Thomas; 30 October 1991 (age 35) Kingston upon Thames, England
- Height: 1.85 m (6 ft 1 in)
- Weight: 120 kg (18 st 13 lb; 265 lb)
- School: Millfield
- University: University of Manchester

Rugby union career
- Position: Tighthead Prop
- Current team: Scarlets
Senior career
Years	Team	Apps	(Points)
2010–2014	Sale Sharks	82	(40)
2014–2021	Bath	118	(20)
2021–2024	Montpellier	43	(5)
2024	Castres	14	(0)
2024–	Scarlets	39	(10)
- Correct as of 13 August 2026
International career
Years	Team	Apps	(Points)
- England U16
- England U18
2011	England U20	7	(10)
2013–2014	England	7	(0)
2023–	Wales	4	(0)
- Correct as of 7 October 2023

Henry Thomas (born 30 October 1991) is a professional rugby union player who plays as a prop for United Rugby Championship club Scarlets. At international level Thomas has played for both England and Wales; first making his debut for England in 2013, before representing Wales in 2023.

== Club career ==
In the 2010–11 season, Thomas started as captain of Sale Sharks. Continuing his good performances for the Jets, in October he progressed to the senior squad, continuing to make 14 Premiership appearances in the season. In March 2013 he came off the bench for the Sale side that lost to Harlequins in the final of the Anglo-Welsh Cup.

In January 2014 it was announced that Thomas had signed for Bath. In his first season at the club he played in the 2015 Premiership final which saw Bath lose against Saracens to finish runners up.

On 27 July 2021, Thomas left Bath after seven years with the club to join French side Montpellier. They won the 2021–22 Top 14 season league title in his first season at the club. In January 2024 it was confirmed that Thomas would spend the remainder of the 2023–24 Top 14 season with Castres Olympique.

After three years in France it was announced that Thomas would join Scarlets for the 2024–25 United Rugby Championship.

== International career ==
=== England ===
Thomas represented England U20 during the 2011 Six Nations Under 20s Championship and started in their decisive last fixture which saw them defeat Ireland to complete a grand slam. Later that year he scored a try against Ireland in their opening game of the 2011 IRB Junior World Championship. He also scored a try in the final which they lost against New Zealand to finish runners up.

In July 2012 Thomas was included in the England A squad along with fellow Sale teammates Rob Miller and James Gaskell. In January 2013 Thomas received his first call-up to the senior England squad as an injury replacement for Alex Corbisiero during the 2013 Six Nations but did not feature in the tournament.

Thomas was selected for the 2013 Tour of Argentina and on 8 June 2013 made his Test debut as a second-half replacement for Joe Marler. He also came off the bench in the following match as England defeated Argentina to win the series.

Thomas played in victories over Scotland, Ireland and Wales during the 2014 Six Nations Championship as England completed their first Triple Crown for over a decade. He also featured in the last round away to Italy as England finished runners up.

Thomas was included in the squad for their 2014 tour of New Zealand and on 7 June 2014 played in the opening test of the series at Eden Park. This was ultimately his seventh and last appearance for England.

=== Wales ===
On 1 May 2023, Warren Gatland selected Thomas in Wales' 54 player training squad for the 2023 Rugby World Cup. He qualifies for Wales through his Swansea-born father and is eligible under World Rugby regulations because he played for England more than three years ago.

Thomas made his Wales debut on 5 August 2023, coming off the bench in the first test of their 2023 Rugby World Cup warm-up matches, in a win against former team England. His two appearances during the world cup both came in pool stage victories against Australia and Georgia.
