= Joe Launchbury =

English rugby union player (born 1991)

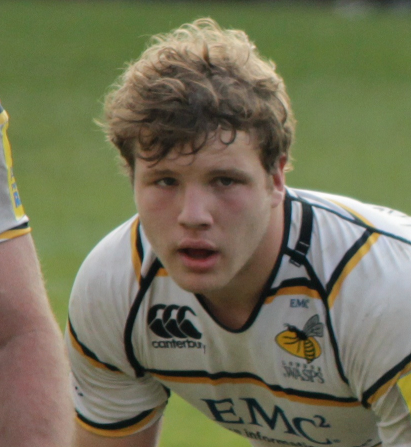
- Launchbury playing for London Wasps in 2012
- Born: Joseph Oliver Launchbury; 12 April 1991 (age 35) Exeter, England
- Height: 1.98 m (6 ft 6 in)
- Weight: 125 kg (19 st 10 lb; 276 lb)
- School: Christ's Hospital

Rugby union career
- Position: Lock
Senior career
Years	Team	Apps	(Points)
2009–2010	Worthing	22	(35)
2010–2022	Wasps	155	(45)
2010–2011	→ Rosslyn Park (loan)	6	(5)
2022–2023	Toyota Verblitz	4	(5)
2023–	Harlequins	32	(0)
- Correct as of 19 January 2025
International career
Years	Team	Apps	(Points)
2009	England U18		
2011	England U20	8	(0)
2012–2022	England	70	(25)
- Correct as of 19 September 2025

Joseph Oliver Launchbury (born 12 April 1991) is a former English rugby union lock who most recently played for Harlequins in PREM Rugby. He represented England at international level making his Test debut in 2012. Launchbury played mainly in the second row.

== Club career ==
=== Youth ===
Born in Exeter, Launchbury was introduced to rugby by his coach Shaun Parkin at Exmouth RFC. Launchbury was educated at St John’s Sidmouth in East Devon, where he captained the school rugby team, and Christ's Hospital, Horsham. He played for Horsham and also represented Barns Green before joining the Harlequins Academy age 15. After Harlequins failed to offer him a professional contract aged 18, he left the club and joined then National League 2 South side Worthing Raiders for the 2009–10 season. His performances at Worthing under Will Green, then head coach and former Wasps player, saw him recommended to his former club once again under the stewardship of renowned coach Bobby Walsh. He played in several A League matches for Wasps and, after a spell training with the Eastern Province Kings in South Africa, did enough to be given a full-time contract from July 2010.

=== Wasps ===
Launchbury was named in Wasps' Academy squad for the 2010–11 season and joined National League 1 side Rosslyn Park on loan to gain senior experience. Having played the first half of the season for the A team and out on loan, Launchbury made his Wasps' debut on 30 January 2011 in the Anglo-Welsh Cup against Harlequins as a replacement, scoring a try in a 38–13 defeat. His first Premiership appearance came the following month against Leicester Tigers and he remained a fixture in the side for the rest of the season. In May 2011 he was named the club's Young Player and Academy Player of the Season and was rewarded with a new three-year contract.

In 2011–12, Launchbury's first full season with Wasps, Launchbury made 15 senior team appearances despite missing four months of the season after injuring his ankle in October. He returned to the side in February as a replacement but went into the starting XV for the next game and was ever-present as Wasps retained their Premiership status. All but one of his appearances over the season were made as a blindside flanker despite playing in the second row for most of the previous year.

Launchbury graduated from the Academy at the end of the season, moving up to the senior squad alongside several other England youth internationals.

Launchbury extended his contract in November 2012, keeping him with Wasps until 2015. He made 19 appearances during the campaign and was widely recognised for his performances, winning the November Player of the Month award and 2012–13 Premiership Young Player of the Season. He was also nominated for the Rugby Players' Association Players' Player of the Year and Young Player of the Year awards, missing out on both occasions to Wasps and England teammate Christian Wade, and was among 15 players longlisted for ERC European Player of the Year.

Ahead of the 2016/17 Aviva premiership campaign Launchbury was named captain of Wasps.

Wasps entered administration on 17 October 2022 and Launchbury was made redundant along with all other players and coaching staff. Following Wasps' entry into administration, Launchbury signed a short-term deal to join Japanese club Toyota Verblitz from December 2022 to May 2023, for the 2022-23 Japan Rugby League One season.

=== Harlequins ===
On 21 November 2022 it was announced that Launchbury would join Harlequins, signing a multi-year deal to return to the club ahead of the 2023–24 season, following his time in Japan. During the 2023–24 Champions Cup, Launchbury made an appearance from the bench, replacing Irné Herbst, as Harlequins beat Glasgow Warriors to record their first ever victory in the knockout stages of the European Rugby Champions Cup.

Launchbury announced his retirement in April 2026. His final game for Harlequins was on 25th April 2026.

== International career ==
Launchbury's first international experience came as part of the England under-18 side which finished runners-up in the 2009 European Under-18 Rugby Union Championship. He moved up to the under-20s in 2011, making his debut as a replacement against Italy in the Under-20s Six Nations. Despite not being included in the original squad he was elevated to the starting line-up for the following game and earned the Man of the Match award against Ireland as England won the Grand Slam. He was selected for the Junior World Championship in June the same year and started every game as England reached the final, eventually losing 33–22 to New Zealand. He was named England Player of the Tournament by his teammates.

In 2012 Launchbury was called up to the senior squad for the tour of South Africa. He played in the uncapped game against the Barbarians at Twickenham but an injury picked up in training forced him to return home. The following month he was included in the Saxons squad and in November was called into the England training camp for the Autumn internationals as injury cover for Wasps teammate Tom Palmer. He made his Test debut days later as a replacement against Fiji and was promoted to the starting line-up against Australia. He retained his place for the match against New Zealand as England recorded their first win over the All Blacks since 2003. After impressing in all four Autumn Tests, Launchbury was voted Man of the Series.

Launchbury started in all five of England's Six Nations matches as they finished runners-up to Wales and was named England Player of the Year for 2012–13 in his first season as a senior international. Several commentators backed him for a place in the British & Irish Lions squad for the 2013 tour to Australia but he was not selected. Instead he travelled with England for the tour of Argentina, starting both Tests in a 2–0 series win.

Launchbury retained his starting place for the 2013 Autumn internationals as England beat first Australia and then Argentina, a game in which he scored his first international try, grounding the ball after a rolling maul. A second try followed against the All Blacks, although he was forced off after 46 minutes with a shoulder injury. England were unable to repeat the previous year's win, losing 30–22. Launchbury was ever-present during the 2014 Six Nations, starting all five games including the match against Ireland in which he made 15 tackles and won three turnovers. His partnership in the second row with Courtney Lawes, which began during the Autumn internationals, was praised throughout the tournament as England finished runners-up for the second year in a row.

Launchbury was among an initial group of 30 players selected for the three Test summer tour to New Zealand. He started the first two games, in which England were defeated narrowly. He was dropped for the third Test but was restored to the starting line-up after Geoff Parling failed to overcome an injury sustained in the second game. England lost the game 36–13, their heaviest defeat of the tour, as New Zealand took the series 3–0.

Launchbury was named Man of the Match in two consecutive Six Nations games: against Wales and Italy. Launchbury was not selected to be a member of the British an Irish Lions Touring party to New Zealand, which was a controversial call following his success in the Six Nations. Many Rugby experts were left confused by Launchbury's shock omission from the Squad.

Launchbury was called up for the 2022 Six Nations to replace Lewis Ludlam, who suffered a rib injury in the second half of England’s first match against Scotland.

=== International tries ===
As of 7 July 2019

Try	Opposing team	Location	Venue	Competition	Date	Result	Score
1	Argentina	London, England	Twickenham Stadium	2013 Autumn Internationals	9 November 2013	Win	31 – 12
2	New Zealand	London, England	Twickenham Stadium	2013 Autumn Internationals	16 November 2013	Loss	22 – 30
3	Fiji	London, England	Twickenham Stadium	2016 Autumn Internationals	19 November 2016	Win	58 – 15
4	Fiji	London, England	Twickenham Stadium	2016 Autumn Internationals	19 November 2016	Win	58 – 15
5	Scotland	London, England	Twickenham Stadium	2019 Six Nations	16 March 2019	Draw	38 – 38

== Coaching Career ==
Launchbury became Head of Academy at Worcester Warriors in June 2026.

== Personal life ==
Launchbury is married to Mallory Bourn and they have three children, Blythe Alexandra, Hayden Oliver and Quinn Alexander. His brother in law is footballer Korey Smith (their wives are sisters).

== Honours ==
London Wasps

- Academy Player of the Year: 2010–11
- Young Player of the Year: 2010–11
- Premiership Player of the Month: November 2012
- Premiership Young Player of the Season: 2012–13

England

- Six Nations Under 20s Championship: 2011 Grand Slam winners
- IRB Junior World Championship: 2011 (runners-up)
- IRB Junior World Championship: 2011 England Player of the Tournament
- Autumn internationals: 2012 England Man of the Series
- England Player of the Year: 2012–13
- Rugby World Cup runner up: 2019
