= Rob Webber =

England international rugby union player

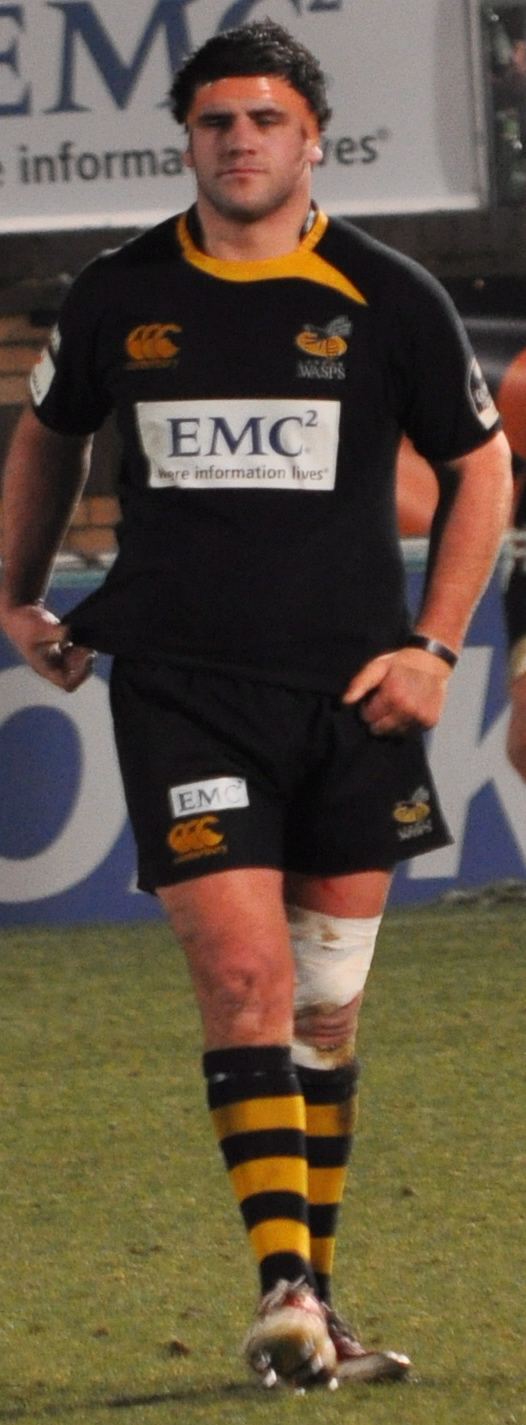
- Born: Robert Webber; 1 August 1986 (age 40) York, England
- Height: 1.83 m (6 ft 0 in)
- Weight: 118 kg (18 st 8 lb)
- School: Pocklington School

Rugby union career
- Position: Hooker
- Current team: Saracens (coach)
Youth career
- Pocklington RUFC
Senior career
Years	Team	Apps	(Points)
2003–2005	Leeds Tykes	2	(0)
2005–2012	Wasps	109	(15)
2012–2016	Bath Rugby	90	(35)
2016–2020	Sale Sharks	101	(10)
- Correct as of 13 September 2020
International career
Years	Team	Apps	(Points)
2009–2010	England Saxons	6	(5)
2012–2015	England	16	(5)
- Correct as of 4 October 2015
National sevens team
Years	Team		Comps
2008	England		London
Coaching career
- Years: Team
- 2020–2023: Jersey Reds
- 2023–2024: Chicago Hounds
- 2024–: Saracens

Rob Webber (born 1 August 1986) is an English former rugby union player. Webber's position of choice was as at hooker and he could also play in the back-row. He is currently assistant coach at Saracens.

== Club career ==
Webber played for Leeds Carnegie in the 2004–05 EPCR Challenge Cup. In 2005 Webber left Leeds to join London Wasps. After initially breaking into the Wasps team as an open-side flanker, Webber established himself as the club's first choice hooker during the 2008–09 season. His form in the 2009–10 season saw him made Wasps captain during the absence of Tom Rees.

In January 2012 it was announced that Webber would join Bath Rugby on a three-year deal starting from the 2012–13 season. He scored two tries against his former club Wasps during the 2013–14 European Challenge Cup semi-final but missed the final due to injury which they lost against Northampton Saints. The following season saw him play in the 2015 Premiership final as Bath were defeated by Saracens to finish league runners-up.

On 1 February 2016, it was confirmed that Webber would leave Bath to join rivals Sale Sharks. He started in their 2019 European Challenge Cup semi-final defeat against La Rochelle.

In March 2020 Webber announced he would be leaving Sale at the end of that season to take up a role as forwards coach at Jersey Reds. Following the departure of Ed Robinson, in July 2021 Webber was promoted to the role of Head Coach ahead of season 2021-22. After Jersey encountered financial issues he took up a new role with Chicago Hounds. In 2024 Webber joined Saracens' coaching staff.

== International career ==
Webber represented England at U16, U18 and U19 level. He was part of the England squad that finished fifth at the 2006 Under 21 Rugby World Championship. Webber represented England at the 2008 London Sevens.

Webber was a member of the England Saxons squad that participated at the 2008 Churchill Cup, although he did not take the field. In January 2009 he made his England A debut against Portugal. Later that year he was part of the side that finished runners-up at the 2009 Churchill Cup and started in the final against Ireland.

Webber was a member of the Senior England squad for their 2010 Summer tour of Australasia. He did not feature in a test match but did play in a defeat against the Māori All Blacks.

Webber was included in the England squad for the 2012 Six Nations Championship. He was an unused substitute in the opening match against Scotland. Webber made his test debut in their next game on 11 February 2012 as a second half substitute for Dylan Hartley against Italy at the Stadio Olimpico. He also played against Wales and France as England ultimately finished runners up.

Webber made his first start for England in the opening test of their 2013 tour of Argentina. A week later he scored his only try at international level as England beat Argentina to complete a series win.

Webber was a member of the England squad on their 2014 tour of New Zealand. He played in all three tests as the All Blacks completed a series whitewash. Later that year he played in autumn internationals against South Africa, Samoa and Australia.

Webber was included in the England squad for the 2015 Rugby World Cup and played in the opening game of the tournament against Fiji. He also featured in defeats against Wales and Australia as the hosts failed to make the knockout phase. After the world cup Webber never played for England again and finished with sixteen caps.

=== List of international tries ===
as of 15 June 2013.

No.	Date	Venue	Opponent	Score	Result	Competition	Ref.
1	15 June 2013	José Amalfitani Stadium, Buenos Aires, Argentina	Argentina	30–19	51–26	2013 tour of Argentina	

== Honours ==
Bath

- Premiership Rugby runner-up: 2014–15
- EPCR Challenge Cup runner-up: 2013–14
