= Guillermo Roan =

Argentine rugby union player (born 1988)

- Born: 18 June 1988 (age 38) La Plata, Argentina
- Height: 1.82 m (6 ft 0 in)
- Weight: 120 kg (18 st 13 lb; 265 lb)

Rugby union career
- Position: Prop
- Current team: La Plata
Youth career
- La Plata
Senior career
Years	Team	Apps	(Points)
2009−2011	La Plata	24	(15)
2010	Pampas XV	6	(5)
2011−2012	Wasps	-	(-)
2011−2012	→London Welsh	8	(5)
2012−2013	I Cavalieri Prato	21	(5)
2013−2015	Rovigo Delta	31	(5)
2015−2017	Zebre	30	(5)
2017−2019	La Plata	29	(20)
- Correct as of 21 May 2020
International career
Years	Team	Apps	(Points)
2006−2008	Argentina Under 20	10	(0)
2010	Argentina XV	3	(0)
2013	Argentina	3	(0)
- Correct as of 21 May 2020

Guillermo Roan (born 18 June 1988) is an Argentine rugby union player. His usual position is as a Prop and he currently plays for La Plata in Torneo de la URBA.

For 2015-2016 and 2016–17 Pro12 seasons he played for Zebre.

After playing for Argentina Under 20, until 2008, Roan was named in the Argentina XV squad for and 2010 IRB Nations Cup and in 2013 in the Argentina squad for summer international tests.
