= Pablo Henn =

Argentine rugby union player (born 1982)

- Born: Pablo Henn; 15 July 1982 (age 44) Don Torcuato, Argentina
- Height: 1.82 m (5 ft 11 1/2 in)
- Weight: 115 kg (18 st 2 lb)

Rugby union career
- Position: Prop
Senior career
Years	Team	Apps	(Points)
- Hindu Club
2005–2006	Stade Français	6	(5)
2006–2008	US Montauban	34	(15)
2009–2013	CA Brive	80	(5)
2013–2014	Limoges		
2014–	London Welsh		
- Correct as of 12 June 2013
International career
Years	Team	Apps	(Points)
2010–	Argentina Jaguars	9	(5)
2004–	Argentina		
- Correct as of 17 June 2013

Pablo Henn (born 15 July 1982) is an Argentine rugby union footballer who plays at prop for London Welsh and has also represented the Argentina national rugby union team.

== Career ==
Henn started his career with Hindu Club in Argentina. In 2005, he was signed by the top French club Stade Français Paris who compete in the Top 14. After one season, in 2006, he joined US Montauban who play in the Top 14, the first level of domestic competition in France. He was signed by CA Brive. After 5 seasons, he left Brive and he signed for Limgoes for the 2013–14 season, competing in Federale 1, the third level of domestic competition in France. On 10 July 2014, Henn was signed to the English club London Welsh who compete in the Aviva Premiership from the 2014–15 season.
