= Benjamín Madero =

Argentine rugby union player (born 1988)

- Born: 18 June 1988 (age 38) Buenos Aires, Argentina
- Height: 5 ft 8 in (173 cm)
- Weight: 189 lb (86 kg)

Rugby union career
- Position: Fly-half
International career
Years	Team	Apps	(Points)
2011–13	Argentina	4	(29)

Benjamín Madero (born 18 June 1988) is an Argentine professional rugby union player.

A fly-half, Madero represented Argentina at the 2008 IRB Junior World Championship and gained four caps for the Pumas from 2011 to 2013, which included a match against England.

Madero won two Top 14 championships with San Isidro Club and since 2018 has played his rugby in Italy. He had four seasons playing for Amatori Catania, then got signed by Top10 team Rugby Viadana for their 2022–23 campaign, where he took on the role of a player-coach, taking charge of their seconds side Caimani in the Serie B.

== See also ==
- List of Argentina national rugby union players
