= Mauricio Guidone =

Argentine rugby union player (born 1988)

- Full name: Mauricio Raul Guidone
- Born: 28 January 1988 (age 38) La Plata, Argentina
- Height: 6 ft 1 in (185 cm)
- Weight: 231 lb (105 kg)

Rugby union career
- Position: Hooker / Prop
International career
Years	Team	Apps	(Points)
2008–13	Argentina	8	(5)

Mauricio Raul Guidone (born 28 January 1988) is an Argentine former international rugby union player.

Born in La Plata, Guidone was a front-rower, trained at the San Juan Rugby Club.

Guidone represented Argentina at the 2008 IRB Junior World Championship and in the same year made his Pumas debut off the bench against Chile in Santiago. He was a member of the Pampas XV that won the 2011 Vodacom Cup. Most of his rugby was played with the La Plata Rugby Club and he had a short stint in France playing for Stade Montois in the Pro D2 competition. In 2013, Guidone featured in both of the Pumas' home Tests against England.

== See also ==
- List of Argentina national rugby union players
