= Maximiliano Bustos (rugby union) =

Argentine rugby union player (born 1986)

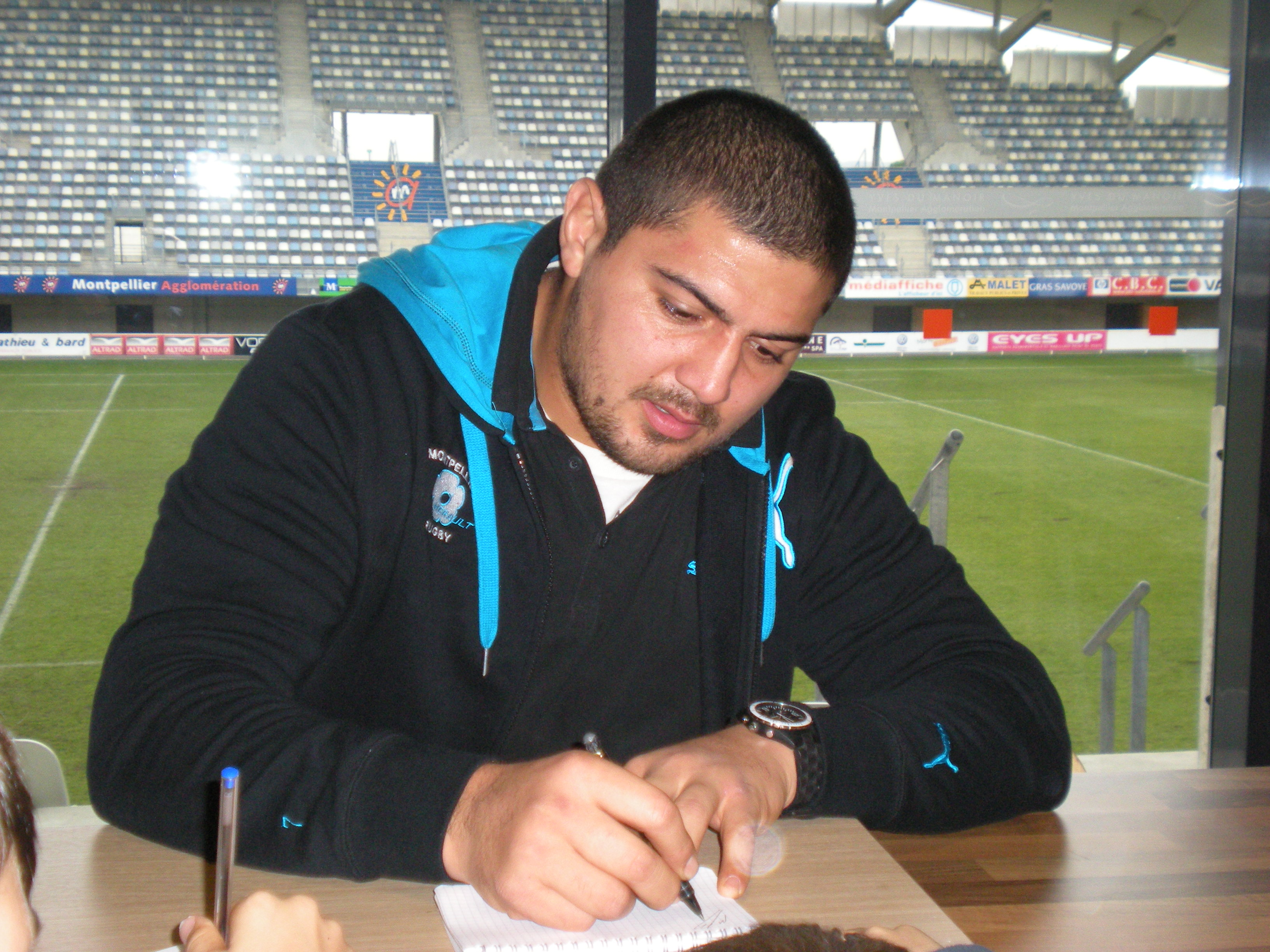
- Born: Maximiliano Andres Bustos; 2 April 1986 (age 40) Santa Fe, Argentina
- Height: 6 ft 1 in (1.85 m)
- Weight: 271.17 lb (123.00 kg)

Rugby union career
- Position: Prop
- Current team: Montpellier
Senior career
Years	Team	Apps	(Points)
2008–09	UR Capitolina	17	(0)
2009–10	L'Aquila	15	(0)
2011	Pampas XV	8	(0)
2011–	Montpellier	60	(10)
- Correct as of 6 November 2013
International career
Years	Team	Apps	(Points)
2012–	Argentina	7	(0)
- Correct as of 24 November 2013

Maximiliano Bustos (born 2 April 1986) is a rugby union footballer who plays as a prop. Bustos was part of the Argentine squad at the 2011 Rugby World Cup.
