= Kearnan Myall =

English rugby union footballer

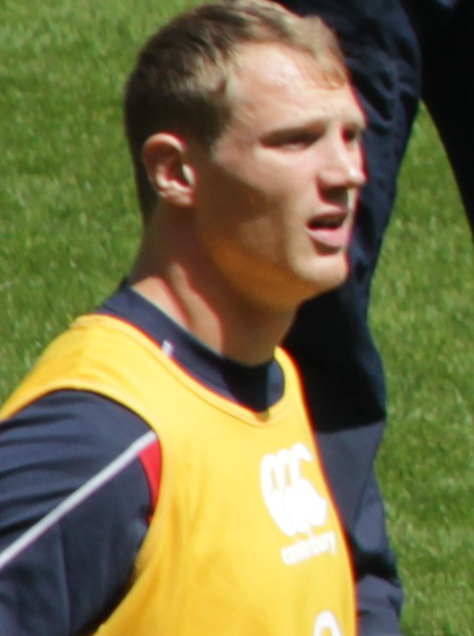
- Born: Kearnan Myall; 15 December 1986 (age 39) Huddersfield, England
- Height: 2.01 m (6 ft 7 in)
- Weight: 110 kg (17 st 5 lb; 243 lb)
- School: Holmfirth High; Greenhead College

Rugby union career
- Position: Lock
- Current team: Wasps RFC
Senior career
Years	Team	Apps	(Points)
-2011	Leeds	58	(10)
2011–2013	Sale Sharks	25	(0)
2013-	Wasps RFC		
- Correct as of 12 May 2012
International career
Years	Team	Apps	(Points)
2004	England U18		
2009-	England Saxons	6	

Kearnan Myall (born 15 December 1986, in Huddersfield, West Yorkshire) is a retired rugby union player who last played for Wasps RFC. He previously played for Sale Sharks and Leeds Carnegie.

== Early life ==
Born in Huddersfield, West Yorkshire and raised in the Holmfirth area, he played junior rugby for both Huddersfield RUFC and YMCA and was at Leeds at the same time as fellow Huddersfield born England player Luther Burrell. He is a former student of Holmfirth High School and Greenhead College.

He joined the Leeds Academy at the age of 15 and has fulfilled the initial promise he showed when helping the club to win the National Colts Cup in 2004, the year he represented England U18 Clubs in the Home Nations tournament in Belfast.

Two seasons later, he made his first team debut off the bench against Sale in the Powergen Cup, a significant step up from his earlier appearances for Holmfirth and Huddersfield YMCA. He appeared 127 times for Leeds and scored 12 tries before crossing the Pennines along with Carnegie club mates Luther Burrell, Hendre Fourie and Scott Mathie to join the Sharks. In his final campaign for Leeds, he made 28 appearances and played the full 80 minutes in all except seven of those games.

He has since joined Wasps, starting in the 2013-2014 campaign.

== International career ==
Myall has been capped by England at both England U18 and England Saxons level and was included in head coach Stuart Lancaster's team for the 2013 tour of South America. His first appearance for England came as a replacement for England against the Barbarians in an uncapped match.
