= Haydn Thomas =

English rugby union player

- Born: 17 September 1982 (age 44) Marston Green, England
- Height: 1.73 m (5 ft 8 in)
- Weight: 80 kg (12 st 8 lb; 176 lb)

Rugby union career
- Position: Scrum-half
Senior career
Years	Team	Apps	(Points)
2003–2005	Exeter Chiefs		
2005–2007	Gloucester Rugby	17	(5)
2007–2009	Bristol Rugby	19	(5)
2009–2017	Exeter Chiefs	45	(20)

Haydn Thomas (born 17 September 1982), educated at Sir John Colfox School in Bridport Dorset, is a rugby union player for Exeter in the Aviva Premiership. He has previously played for Bristol and Gloucester.

Haydn Thomas' position of choice is as a scrum-half. Thomas has twice been called up to the England side for an end of season uncapped match against the Barbarians. He was first called up in May 2012, but he was not used in the match. Thomas was called up again a year later on 15 May 2013.
