= Martín García Veiga =

Argentine rugby union player (born 1986)

- Born: 20 June 1986 (age 40) Buenos Aires, Argentina
- Height: 5 ft 11 in (180 cm)
- Weight: 227 lb (103 kg)

Rugby union career
- Position: Hooker
International career
Years	Team	Apps	(Points)
2012–13	Argentina	6	(5)

Martín García Veiga (born 20 June 1986) is an Argentine former international rugby union player.

A Buenos Aires hooker, García Veiga was capped six times for the Pumas across 2012 and 2013, including as a member of the starting XV in back to back home internationals against England.

García Veiga headed overseas in 2014 and had two seasons with the Jersey Reds, which was followed by stints at French clubs RC Vannes and USA Perpignan. He joined Spain's FC Barcelona in 2018.

== See also ==
- List of Argentina national rugby union players
