= 2013 Wales rugby union tour of Japan =

- Coach: Robin McBryde
- Tour captain: Bradley Davies
- Top test point scorer: Dan Biggar (17)
- Top test try scorer(s): Harry Robinson (1); Tom Prydie (1)
Summary
P	W	D	L
Total
2	1	0	1
Test match
2	1	0	1
Opponent
P	W	D	L
Japan
2	1	0	1

Tour chronology
- ← Australia 2012 South Africa 2014 →

In June 2013, Wales toured Japan as part of the 2013 mid-year rugby test series. They faced Japan in a two-test series on 8 and 15 June, playing in the oldest dedicated rugby union stadium in Japan, Kintetsu Hanazono Rugby Stadium in Osaka, and the home stadium of Japanese rugby, Chichibunomiya Rugby Stadium in Tokyo. The test series was Wales' first test series against Japan since 2001, when Wales were victorious 2–0, and their first encounter since Wales' 72–18 victory in the 2007 Rugby World Cup Pool B match. Wales were also the first Tier 1 nation to play Japan in Japan since Italy in 2006.

At the start of the tour Japan were yet to earn a victory over the Welsh, with Wales winning all fixtures before this test series. However, the second match of the series saw Japan win their first test match against Wales. The test series ended in a 1–1 draw with Wales winning the first test and Japan winning the second.

== Fixtures ==
Date	Venue	Home	Score	Away
8 June 2013	Kintetsu Hanazono Rugby Stadium, Osaka	Japan	18–22	Wales
15 June 2013	Chichibunomiya Rugby Stadium, Tokyo	Japan	23–8	Wales

== Squads ==
=== Wales ===
In the absence of Warren Gatland and Rob Howley with their commitments on the 2013 British & Irish Lions tour to Australia, Robin McBryde took on the role of head coach. On 21 May, McBryde named a 27-man squad for the tour.

Aaron Shingler and Ashley Beck were ruled out with injury ahead of the tour (28 May) and was replaced with Josh Navidi and Adam Warren 15 players were also unavailable due to selection for the Lions tour to Australia.

- Head coach: Robin McBryde (interim)

Note: Flags indicate national union for the club/province as defined by World Rugby.

Player	Position	Date of birth (age)	Caps	Club/province
Scott Baldwin	Hooker	12 July 1988 (aged 24)	0	(Wales) Ospreys
Emyr Phillips	Hooker	22 February 1987 (aged 26)	0	(Wales) Scarlets
Scott Andrews	Prop	1 August 1989 (aged 23)	6	(Wales) Cardiff Blues
Ryan Bevington	Prop	9 December 1988 (aged 24)	9	(Wales) Ospreys
Rhys Gill	Prop	30 October 1986 (aged 26)	3	(England) Saracens
Rhodri Jones	Prop	23 December 1991 (aged 21)	1	(Wales) Scarlets
Craig Mitchell	Prop	3 May 1986 (aged 27)	14	(England) Exeter Chiefs
Andrew Coombs	Lock	27 October 1984 (aged 28)	4	(Wales) Newport Gwent Dragons
Bradley Davies (c)	Lock	9 January 1987 (aged 26)	38	(Wales) Cardiff Blues
James King	Lock	24 July 1990 (aged 22)	0	(Wales) Ospreys
Lou Reed	Lock	10 September 1987 (aged 25)	3	(Wales) Cardiff Blues
Dan Baker	Flanker	5 July 1992 (aged 20)	0	(Wales) Ospreys
Rob McCusker	Flanker	12 March 1988 (aged 25)	5	(Wales) Scarlets
Josh Navidi	Flanker	30 December 1990 (aged 22)	0	(Wales) Cardiff Blues
Andries Pretorius	Number 8	26 September 1985 (aged 27)	0	(Wales) Cardiff Blues
Tavis Knoyle	Scrum-half	2 June 1990 (aged 23)	9	(Wales) Scarlets
Lloyd Williams	Scrum-half	30 November 1989 (aged 23)	13	(Wales) Cardiff Blues
Dan Biggar	Fly-half	16 October 1989 (aged 23)	16	(Wales) Ospreys
Rhys Patchell	Fly-half	17 May 1993 (aged 20)	0	(Wales) Cardiff Blues
Jonathan Spratt	Centre	28 April 1986 (aged 27)	2	(Wales) Ospreys
Adam Warren	Centre	7 March 1991 (aged 22)	1	(Wales) Scarlets
Owen Williams	Centre	2 October 1991 (aged 21)	0	(Wales) Cardiff Blues
Dafydd Howells	Wing	22 March 1995 (aged 18)	0	(Wales) Ospreys
Harry Robinson	Wing	16 April 1993 (aged 20)	1	(Wales) Cardiff Blues
Liam Williams	Fullback	9 April 1991 (aged 22)	3	(Wales) Scarlets
Tom Prydie	Fullback	23 February 1992 (aged 21)	4	(Wales) Newport Gwent Dragons
Steven Shingler	Fullback	20 June 1991 (aged 21)	0	(England) London Irish

=== Japan ===
The Japanese 36-man squad for 2013 IRB Pacific Nations Cup and Wales' tour of Japan.

- Head coach: (Australia) Eddie Jones
- Caps and ages are to first Test (8 June 2013)

Note: Flags indicate national union for the club/province as defined by World Rugby.

Player	Position	Date of birth (age)	Caps	Club/province
Yusuke Aoki	Hooker	19 June 1983 (aged 29)	25	(Japan) Suntory
Shota Horie	Hooker	21 January 1986 (aged 27)	19	(Australia) Melbourne Rebels
Hiroki Yuhara	Hooker	21 January 1984 (aged 29)	11	(Japan) Toshiba
Takuma Asahara	Prop	7 September 1987 (aged 25)	3	(Japan) Toshiba
Kensuke Hatakeyama	Prop	2 August 1985 (aged 27)	38	(Japan) Suntory
Takeshi Kizu	Prop	15 July 1988 (aged 24)	15	(Japan) Kobelco Steelers
Masataka Mikami	Prop	4 June 1988 (aged 25)	2	(Japan) Toshiba
Yusuke Nagae	Prop	19 July 1985 (aged 27)	9	(Japan) Black Rams
Hiroshi Yamashita	Prop	1 January 1986 (aged 27)	18	(Japan) Kobelco Steelers
Michael Broadhurst	Lock	30 October 1986 (aged 26)	5	(Japan) Black Rams
Shoji Ito	Lock	2 December 1980 (aged 32)	10	(Japan) Kobelco Steelers
Shinya Makabe	Lock	26 March 1987 (aged 26)	12	(Japan) Suntory
Hitoshi Ono	Lock	6 May 1978 (aged 35)	66	(Japan) Toshiba
Hendrik Tui	Lock	13 December 1987 (aged 25)	7	(Japan) Panasonic
Justin Ives	Flanker	24 May 1984 (aged 29)	10	(Japan) Panasonic
Michael Leitch	Flanker	7 October 1988 (aged 24)	28	(New Zealand) Chiefs
Ryuta Yasui	Flanker	6 December 1989 (aged 23)	1	(Japan) Kobelco Steelers
Takashi Kikutani	Number 8	24 February 1980 (aged 33)	56	(Japan) Toyota Verblitz
Koliniasi Holani	Number 8	25 October 1981 (aged 31)	24	(Japan) Panasonic
Atsushi Hiwasa	Scrum-half	22 May 1987 (aged 26)	20	(Japan) Suntory
Fumiaki Tanaka	Scrum-half	3 January 1985 (aged 28)	33	(New Zealand) Highlanders
Keisuke Uchida	Scrum-half	22 February 1992 (aged 21)	3	(Japan) Tsukuba University
Ryoto Nakamura	Fly-half	28 January 1991 (aged 22)	1	(Japan) Teikyo University
Kosei Ono	Fly-half	17 April 1987 (aged 26)	16	(Japan) Suntory
Yuu Tamura	Fly-half	9 January 1989 (aged 24)	6	(Japan) Green Rockets
Yuta Imamura	Centre	31 October 1984 (aged 28)	35	(Japan) Kobe Steel
Male Sa'u	Centre	13 October 1987 (aged 25)	2	(Japan) Yamaha Jubilo
Seiichi Shimonura	Centre	20 September 1981 (aged 31)	4	(Japan) Panasonic
Harumichi Tatekawa	Centre	2 December 1989 (aged 23)	12	(Japan) Kubota Spears
Craig Wing	Centre	26 December 1979 (aged 33)	1	(Japan) Kobelco Steelers
Yoshikazu Fujita	Wing	8 October 1993 (aged 19)	3	(Japan) Waseda University
Kenki Fukuoka	Wing	7 September 1992 (aged 20)	2	(Japan) University of Tsukuba
Toshiaki Hirose (c)	Wing	17 October 1981 (aged 31)	11	(Japan) Toshiba
Hirotoki Onozawa	Wing	29 March 1978 (aged 35)	78	(Japan) Suntory Sungoliath
Ayumu Goromaru	Fullback	1 March 1986 (aged 27)	20	(Japan) Yamaha Jubilo

== Matches ==
=== First test ===
8 June 2013
14:00 JST (UTC+9)

Japan	18–22	Wales
Try: Broadhurst 38' m Fujita 69' c Con: Goromaru (1/2) 70'; Pen: Goromaru (2/4) 15', 20'	Report	Try: Robinson 63' c Con: Biggar (1/1) 64'; Pen: Biggar (4/5) 23', 29', 46', 59'; Patchell (1/1) 79'

Hanazono Rugby Stadium, Osaka
Attendance: 20,152
Referee: Lourens van der Merwe (South Africa)

FB	15	Ayumu Goromaru
RW	14	Yoshikazu Fujita
OC	13	Male Sa'u
IC	12	Craig Wing	(substituted off) 70'
LW	11	Kenki Fukuoka	(substituted off) 79'
FH	10	Harumichi Tatekawa
SH	9	Fumiaki Tanaka	(substituted off) 66'
N8	8	Takashi Kikutani (c)
OF	7	Michael Broadhurst
BF	6	Hendrik Tui	(substituted off) 72'
RL	5	Shoji Ito
LL	4	Hitoshi Ono	(substituted off) 80'
TP	3	Hiroshi Yamashita	(substituted off) 64'
HK	2	Shota Horie	30' to 32'		(substituted off) 72'
LP	1	Masataka Mikami	(substituted off) 60'
Replacements:
HK	16	Takeshi Kizu	(substituted on) 30'	(substituted off) 32'	(substituted on) 72'
PR	17	Yusuke Nagae	(substituted on) 60'
PR	18	Kensuke Hatakeyama	(substituted on) 64'
LK	19	Toshizumi Kitagawa	(substituted on) 80'
FL	20	Ryuta Yasui	(substituted on) 72'
SH	21	Atsushi Hiwasa	(substituted on) 66'
FH	22	Yuu Tamura	(substituted on) 70'
WG	23	Hirotoki Onozawa	(substituted on) 79'
Coach:
(Australia) Eddie Jones

FB	15	Liam Williams
RW	14	Harry Robinson
OC	13	Owen Williams
IC	12	Jonathan Spratt
LW	11	Dafydd Howells
FH	10	Dan Biggar		(substituted off) 64'
SH	9	Lloyd Williams		(substituted off) 60'
N8	8	Rob McCusker	(yellow card) 19'	(substituted off) 60'
OF	7	James King
BF	6	Andrew Coombs		(substituted off) 51'
RL	5	Lou Reed
LL	4	Bradley Davies (c)
TP	3	Scott Andrews
HK	2	Emyr Phillips
LP	1	Ryan Bevington		(substituted off) 51'
Replacements:
HK	16	Scott Baldwin
PR	17	Rhys Gill		(substituted on) 51'
PR	18	Rhodri Jones
N8	19	Andries Pretorius		(substituted on) 51'
FL	20	Dan Baker		(substituted on) 60'
SH	21	Tavis Knoyle		(substituted on) 60'
FH	22	Rhys Patchell		(substituted on) 64'
FB	23	Tom Prydie
Coach:
(Wales) Robin McBryde

Touch judges:
Greg Garner (England)
Taizo Hirabayashi (Japan)

Note:

- Dan Baker, Dafydd Howells, James King, Rhys Patchell, Emyr Phillips, Andries Pretorius, Owen Williams (all Wales) and Yusuke Nagae (Japan) made their international debuts.

=== Second test ===
15 June 2013
14:00 JST (UTC+9)

Japan	23–8	Wales
Try: Wing 49' c Broadhurst 60' c Con: Goromaru (2/2) 49', 61'; Pen: Goromaru (3/3) 14', 34', 76'	Report	Try: Prydie 44' m Pen: Biggar (1/2) 21'

Chichibunomiya Rugby Stadium, Tokyo
Attendance: 21,062
Referee: Greg Garner (England)

FB	15	Ayumu Goromaru
RW	14	Toshiaki Hirose (c)
OC	13	Male Sa'u
IC	12	Craig Wing	(substituted off) 69'
LW	11	Kenki Fukuoka	(substituted off) 79'
FH	10	Harumichi Tatekawa
SH	9	Fumiaki Tanaka	(substituted off) 67'
N8	8	Takashi Kikutani
OF	7	Michael Broadhurst
BF	6	Hendrik Tui
RL	5	Shoji Ito	(substituted off) 45'
LL	4	Hitoshi Ono	(substituted off) 74'
TP	3	Hiroshi Yamashita	(substituted off) 45'
HK	2	Shota Horie	(substituted off) 79'
LP	1	Masataka Mikami	(substituted off) 69'
Replacements:
HK	16	Takeshi Kizu	(substituted on) 79'
PR	17	Yusuke Nagae	(substituted on) 69'
PR	18	Kensuke Hatakeyama	(substituted on) 45'
LK	19	Shinya Makabe	(substituted on) 45'
FL	20	Justin Ives	(substituted on) 74'
SH	21	Atsushi Hiwasa	(substituted on) 67'
FH	22	Yuu Tamura	(substituted on) 69'
WG	23	Yoshikazu Fujita	(substituted on) 79'
Coach:
(Australia) Eddie Jones

FB	15	Liam Williams	(substituted off) 53'
RW	14	Harry Robinson
OC	13	Owen Williams	(substituted off) 23'
IC	12	Jonathan Spratt
LW	11	Tom Prydie
FH	10	Dan Biggar
SH	9	Lloyd Williams	(substituted off) 50'
N8	8	Andries Pretorius
OF	7	Josh Navidi	(substituted off) 63'
BF	6	James King
RL	5	Lou Reed	(substituted off) 50'
LL	4	Bradley Davies (c)
TP	3	Scott Andrews	(substituted off) 57'
HK	2	Emyr Phillips	(substituted off) 78'
LP	1	Rhys Gill	(substituted off) 57'
Replacements:
HK	16	Scott Baldwin	(substituted on) 78'
PR	17	Rhodri Jones	(substituted on) 57'
PR	18	Craig Mitchell	(substituted on) 57'
LK	19	Andrew Coombs	(substituted on) 50'
FL	20	Dan Baker	(substituted on) 63'
SH	21	Tavis Knoyle	(substituted on) 50'
FH	22	Rhys Patchell	(substituted on) 23'
WG	23	Dafydd Howells	(substituted on) 53'
Coach:
(Wales) Robin McBryde

Touch judges:
Lourens van der Merwe (South Africa)
Taizo Hirabayashi (Japan)

Note:

- This was Japan's first victory over Wales.

== See also ==
- 2013 mid-year rugby test series
- History of rugby union matches between Japan and Wales
