= 2012 Wales rugby union tour of Australia =

- Coach: Rob Howley
- Tour captain: Sam Warburton
- Top point scorer: Leigh Halfpenny (41)
- Top try scorer: 10 players with 1 try
- Top test point scorer: Leigh Halfpenny (41)
- Top test try scorer: 7 players with 1 try
Summary
P	W	D	L
Total
5	2	0	3
Test match
4	1	0	3
Opponent
P	W	D	L
Australia
3	0	0	3
Barbarians
1	1	0	0

Tour chronology
- ← 2010 New Zealand Japan 2013 →

In June 2012, Wales toured Australia as part of the 2012 mid-year rugby test series. They faced Australia in a series of three internationals across the eastern states, starting at Suncorp Stadium in Brisbane, then moving on to Etihad Stadium in Melbourne, before finishing in Sydney at the Sydney Football Stadium. In addition, they played a tour match against one of Australia's domestic clubs, the Brumbies, at Canberra Stadium.

Before flying to Australia, Wales also held a one-off match at home so that Rob Howley, the caretaker coach, could finalise the squad. This was held at the Millennium Stadium in Cardiff against the Barbarians.

During this tour, Wales were attempting to regain the James Bevan Trophy they lost in 2009, when Australia beat them 33–12 in Cardiff. They had won it the previous year, 21–18. However, the last time Wales beat Australia in Australia was in 1969, when they won 19–16.

This tour was the most keenly anticipated rugby tour of the 2012 tours, with Wales going into it as Grand Slam winners of the 2012 Six Nations and Australia as winners of the 2011 Tri Nations.

Wales lost the series 3–0, continuing their history of not having won in Australia for 43 years. However, all matches were close encounters, and they scored 61 points to Australia's 72. They also played a return match in Cardiff in the 2012 Autumn Internationals that ended in a similar narrow defeat, 14–12.

In the last three matches between the two teams, Wales led with five minutes to go and Australia snatched victory from them.

== Schedule ==
Date	Venue	Home	Score	Away
2 June	Millennium Stadium, Cardiff	Wales	30–21	Barbarians
9 June	Lang Park, Brisbane	Australia	27–19	Wales
12 June	Canberra Stadium, Canberra	Brumbies	15–25	Wales
16 June	Docklands Stadium, Melbourne	Australia	25–23	Wales
23 June	Sydney Football Stadium, Sydney	Australia	20–19	Wales

== Squads ==
=== Wales ===
Towards the end of May, the bulk of the Welsh squad left for Australia, leaving a handful of players to face the Barbarians. After Wales' win over the Barbarians, the few players who had earned their place in the squad during the game left for Australia to join up with the team. Caretaker coach Rob Howley announced a 35-man squad to take to Australia.

- Coach: Rob Howley (caretaker)

Note: Flags indicate national union for the club/province as defined by World Rugby.

Player	Position	Date of birth (age)	Caps	Club/province
Richard Hibbard	Hooker	13 December 1983 (aged 28)	16	(Wales) Ospreys
Ken Owens	Hooker	3 January 1987 (aged 25)	5	(Wales) Scarlets
Matthew Rees	Hooker	9 December 1980 (aged 31)	51	(Wales) Scarlets
Rhys Gill	Prop	30 October 1986 (aged 25)	3	(England) Saracens
Paul James	Prop	13 May 1982 (aged 30)	35	(Wales) Ospreys
Gethin Jenkins	Prop	17 November 1980 (aged 31)	87	(Wales) Cardiff Blues
Adam Jones	Prop	8 March 1981 (aged 31)	80	(Wales) Ospreys
Rhodri Jones	Prop	23 December 1991 (aged 20)	1	(Wales) Scarlets
Luke Charteris	Lock	9 March 1983 (aged 29)	34	(Wales) Newport Gwent Dragons
Bradley Davies	Lock	9 January 1987 (aged 25)	33	(Wales) Cardiff Blues
Ian Evans	Lock	4 October 1984 (aged 27)	23	(Wales) Ospreys
Alun Wyn Jones	Lock	19 September 1985 (aged 26)	63	(Wales) Ospreys
Dan Lydiate	Flanker	18 December 1987 (aged 24)	24	(Wales) Newport Gwent Dragons
Aaron Shingler	Flanker	7 August 1987 (aged 24)	2	(Wales) Scarlets
Justin Tipuric	Flanker	6 August 1989 (aged 22)	5	(Wales) Ospreys
Josh Turnbull	Flanker	12 March 1988 (aged 24)	4	(Wales) Scarlets
Sam Warburton (c)	Flanker	5 October 1988 (aged 23)	27	(Wales) Cardiff Blues
Gareth Delve	Number 8	30 December 1982 (aged 29)	11	(Australia) Melbourne Rebels
Taulupe Faletau	Number 8	12 November 1990 (aged 21)	16	(Wales) Newport Gwent Dragons
Ryan Jones	Number 8	13 March 1981 (aged 31)	64	(Wales) Ospreys
Mike Phillips	Scrum-half	29 August 1982 (aged 29)	65	(France) Bayonne
Rhys Webb	Scrum-half	9 December 1988 (aged 23)	2	(Wales) Ospreys
Lloyd Williams	Scrum-half	30 November 1989 (aged 22)	8	(Wales) Cardiff Blues
James Hook	Fly-half	27 June 1985 (aged 26)	63	(France) Perpignan
Rhys Priestland	Fly-half	9 January 1987 (aged 25)	15	(Wales) Scarlets
Ashley Beck	Centre	15 April 1990 (aged 22)	0	(Wales) Ospreys
Andrew Bishop	Centre	7 August 1985 (aged 26)	16	(Wales) Ospreys
Jonathan Davies	Centre	5 April 1988 (aged 24)	26	(Wales) Scarlets
Scott Williams	Centre	10 October 1990 (aged 21)	12	(Wales) Scarlets
Aled Brew	Wing	9 August 1986 (aged 25)	9	(Wales) Newport Gwent Dragons
Alex Cuthbert	Wing	5 April 1990 (aged 22)	6	(Wales) Cardiff Blues
George North	Wing	13 April 1992 (aged 20)	21	(Wales) Scarlets
Harry Robinson	Wing	16 April 1993 (aged 19)	1	(Wales) Cardiff Blues
Leigh Halfpenny	Fullback	22 December 1988 (aged 23)	32	(Wales) Cardiff Blues
Liam Williams	Fullback	9 April 1991 (aged 21)	1	(Wales) Scarlets

=== Australia ===
Robbie Deans announced his squad to face Wales at the beginning of June. The public already knew that James O'Connor, Kurtley Beale and usual captain James Horwill would all be out of the tour due to injury. From this, Robbie Deans was able to announce his 40-man squad. On 19 June, it was revealed that Beale would return for the third and final test against Wales.

Head coach: Robbie Deans

Player	Position	Date of birth (age)	Caps	Club/province
Saia Fainga'a	Hooker	2 February 1987 (aged 25)	16	Reds
Stephen Moore	Hooker	20 January 1983 (aged 29)	69	Brumbies
Tatafu Polota-Nau	Hooker	26 July 1985 (aged 26)	34	Waratahs
Ben Alexander	Prop	13 November 1984 (aged 27)	39	Brumbies
Sekope Kepu	Prop	5 February 1986 (aged 26)	16	Western Force
Salesi Ma'afu	Prop	26 March 1983 (aged 29)	14	Western Force
Dan Palmer	Prop	13 September 1988 (aged 23)	1	Brumbies
Benn Robinson	Prop	19 July 1984 (aged 27)	44	Waratahs
James Slipper	Prop	6 June 1989 (aged 23)	23	Reds
Kane Douglas	Lock	1 June 1989 (aged 23)	0	Waratahs
Cadeyrn Neville	Lock	9 November 1988 (aged 23)	0	Melbourne Rebels
Hugh Pyle	Lock	21 September 1988 (aged 23)	0	Melbourne Rebels
Nathan Sharpe	Lock	26 February 1978 (aged 34)	104	Western Force
Rob Simmons	Lock	19 April 1989 (aged 23)	19	Reds
Sitaleki Timani	Lock	19 September 1986 (aged 25)	2	Waratahs
Dave Dennis	Flanker	10 January 1986 (aged 26)	3	Waratahs
Scott Higginbotham	Flanker	5 September 1986 (aged 25)	14	Reds
Michael Hooper	Flanker	24 March 1990 (aged 22)	2	Brumbies
David Pocock (c)	Flanker	23 April 1988 (aged 24)	43	Western Force
Ben McCalman	Number 8	18 March 1988 (aged 24)	21	Western Force
Ben Mowen	Number 8	1 December 1984 (aged 27)	0	Brumbies
Wycliff Palu	Number 8	27 July 1982 (aged 29)	40	Waratahs
Will Genia	Scrum-half	17 January 1988 (aged 24)	37	Reds
Nick Phipps	Scrum-half	9 January 1989 (aged 23)	3	Melbourne Rebels
Nic White	Scrum-half	13 June 1990 (aged 21)	0	Brumbies
Berrick Barnes	Fly-half	28 May 1986 (aged 26)	40	Waratahs
Quade Cooper	Fly-half	5 April 1988 (aged 24)	35	Queensland Reds
Bernard Foley	Fly-half	8 September 1989 (aged 22)	0	Waratahs
Anthony Fainga'a	Centre	2 February 1987 (aged 25)	17	Reds
Mike Harris	Centre	8 July 1988 (aged 23)	2	Reds
Rob Horne	Centre	15 August 1989 (aged 22)	11	Waratahs
Pat McCabe	Centre	21 March 1988 (aged 24)	13	Brumbies
Digby Ioane	Wing	14 July 1985 (aged 26)	24	Reds
Dom Shipperley	Wing	16 October 1991 (aged 20)	0	Reds
Joe Tomane	Wing	2 February 1990 (aged 22)	1	Brumbies
Cooper Vuna	Wing	5 July 1987 (aged 24)	2	Melbourne Rebels
Adam Ashley-Cooper	Fullback	27 March 1984 (aged 28)	66	Waratahs
Kurtley Beale	Fullback	6 January 1989 (aged 23)	24	Melbourne Rebels
Jesse Mogg	Fullback	8 June 1989 (aged 23)	0	Brumbies
Luke Morahan	Fullback	28 August 1991 (aged 20)	1	Reds

== Warm-up matches ==
=== Wales vs Barbarians ===
2 June 2012
14:00 BST (UTC+01)

Wales	30–21	Barbarians
Try: Robinson 10' c Hook 71' c Brew 79' c Con: Hook (3/3) 11', 72', 80'; Pen: Hook (3/3) 4', 25', 51'	Report	Try: Donald (2) 27' c, 59' c Rees 36' c Con: Donald (3/3) 28', 37', 60'

Millennium Stadium, Cardiff
Attendance: 57,565
Referee: Alain Rolland (Ireland)

FB	15	Liam Williams
RW	14	Harry Robinson		(substituted off) 35'	(substituted on) 44'	(substituted off) 68'
OC	13	Andrew Bishop
IC	12	James Hook
LW	11	Aled Brew
FH	10	Dan Biggar		(substituted off) 64'
SH	9	Lloyd Williams		(substituted off) 51'
N8	8	Ryan Jones		(substituted off) 51'
OF	7	Justin Tipuric
BF	6	Josh Turnbull
RL	5	Ian Evans
LL	4	Alun Wyn Jones		(substituted off) 45'
TP	3	Rhodri Jones			(substituted off) 44'
HK	2	Matthew Rees (c)		(substituted off) 68'
LP	1	Rhys Gill	(yellow card) 34'
Replacements:
HK	16	Richard Hibbard		(substituted on) 68'
PR	17	Paul James		(substituted on) 35'
LK	18	Aaron Shingler		(substituted on) 51'
FL	19	Martyn Williams		(substituted on) 45'
SH	20	Rhys Webb		(substituted on) 51'
CE	21	Adam Warren		(substituted on) 64'
FB	22	Will Harries				(substituted on) 68'
Coach:
Rob Howley

FB	15	(New Zealand) Mils Muliaina	(substituted off) 66'
RW	14	(Fiji) Isa Nacewa
OC	13	(England) Mike Tindall	(substituted off) 46'
IC	12	(New Zealand) Casey Laulala
LW	11	(Wales) Shane Williams
FH	10	(New Zealand) Stephen Donald
SH	9	(Wales) Richie Rees	(substituted off) 56'
N8	8	(Scotland) Johnnie Beattie
OF	7	(Georgia (country)) Mamuka Gorgodze	(substituted off) 56'
BF	6	(South Africa) Francois Louw
RL	5	(Australia) Mark Chisholm
LL	4	(Ireland) Mick O'Driscoll	(substituted off) 40'
TP	3	(South Africa) John Smit (c)	(substituted off) 46'
HK	2	(France) Benoît August	(substituted off) 40'
LP	1	(Wales) Duncan Jones
Replacements:
HK	16	(New Zealand) Aled de Malmanche	(substituted on) 40'
PR	17	(New Zealand) Neemia Tialata	(substituted on) 46'
LK	18	(South Africa) Anton van Zyl	(substituted on) 40'
N8	19	(Fiji) Akapusi Qera	(substituted on) 56'
SH	20	(Scotland) Rory Lawson	(substituted on) 56'
WG	21	(Samoa) Sailosi Tagicakibau	(substituted on) 46'
FB	22	(France) Cédric Heymans	(substituted on) 66'
Coach:
John Kirwan

Notes:

- The Welsh Rugby Union announced that this would be a fully capped match. As a result, Martyn Williams became the third Welsh player to reach 100 caps when he came off the bench. It was also announced that this match would see the last international appearances for Martyn Williams and Wales top try-scorer Shane Williams.
- Four players made their full international debuts for Wales: Rhodri Jones, Harry Robinson, Liam Williams and Adam Warren.

=== Brumbies vs Wales ===
12 June 2012
19:30 AEST (UTC+10)

Brumbies	15–25	Wales
Pen: Holmes (5/6) 10', 38', 56', 62', 66'	Report	Try: Hook 19' c Tipuric 31' c A.W. Jones 40' m Con: Hook (2/3) 20', 32'; Pen: Hook (2/2) 69', 76'

Canberra Stadium, Canberra
Attendance: 8,000
Referee: Ian Smith (Australia)

FB	15	Robbie Coleman	(substituted off) 54'
RW	14	Cam Crawford
OC	13	Tevita Kuridrani
IC	12	Andrew Smith
LW	11	Kimami Sitauti
FH	10	Zack Holmes
SH	9	Ian Prior	(substituted off) 31'
N8	8	Ita Vaea	(substituted off) 52'
OF	7	Colby Faingaa
BF	6	Peter Kimlin
RL	5	Ben Hand (c)
LL	4	Leon Power	(substituted off) 52'
TP	3	Scott Sio	(substituted off) 31'
HK	2	Anthony Hegarty
LP	1	Ruaidhri Murphy
Replacements:
HK	16	Siliva Siliva
PR	17	JP Pradaud	(substituted on) 31'
LK	18	Dylan Sigg	(substituted on) 52'
LK	19	Fotu Auelua	(substituted on) 52'
SH	20	Beau Mokoputo	(substituted on) 31'
FH	21	Tom Cox	(substituted on) 54'
WG	22	Jesse Mogg
Coach:
Jake White

FB	15	Liam Williams
RW	14	Harry Robinson
OC	13	Andrew Bishop
IC	12	Ashley Beck
LW	11	Aled Brew	(substituted off) 40'
FH	10	James Hook
SH	9	Rhys Webb
N8	8	Aaron Shingler	(substituted off) 30'
OF	7	Justin Tipuric
BF	6	Josh Turnbull
RL	5	Luke Charteris
LL	4	Alun Wyn Jones (c)	(substituted off) 40'
TP	3	Rhodri Jones
HK	2	Richard Hibbard	(substituted off) 71'
LP	1	Paul James	(substituted off) 45'
Replacements:
HK	16	Ken Owens	(substituted on) 71'
PR	17	Rhys Gill	(substituted on) 45'
LK	18	Ian Evans	(substituted on) 40'
N8	19	Gareth Delve	(substituted on) 30'
SH	20	Lloyd Williams		(substituted on) 62'
FH	21	Rhys Priestland
WG	22	Alex Cuthbert	(substituted on) 40'	(substituted off) 62'
Coach:
Rob Howley

Touch judges:
Andrew Lees (Australia)
Will Houston (Australia)

== Test matches ==
=== First test ===
9 June 2012
20:00 AEST (UTC+10)

Australia	27–19	Wales
Try: Higginbotham 14' c Genia 40' c McCabe 66' c Con: Barnes (3/3) 15', 42', 67'; Pen: Barnes (1/3) 8'; Drop: Barnes (1/1) 49'	Report	Try: Cuthbert 57' c Con: Halfpenny (1/1) 59'; Pen: Halfpenny (4/4) 21', 45', 55', 62'

Lang Park, Brisbane
Attendance: 43,000
Referee: Craig Joubert (South Africa)

FB	15	Adam Ashley-Cooper
RW	14	Cooper Vuna
OC	13	Rob Horne	(substituted off) 51'
IC	12	Pat McCabe
LW	11	Digby Ioane
FH	10	Berrick Barnes
SH	9	Will Genia
N8	8	Wycliff Palu	(substituted off) 59'
OF	7	David Pocock (c)	(substituted off) 55'
BF	6	Scott Higginbotham
RL	5	Nathan Sharpe	(substituted off) 65'
LL	4	Rob Simmons
TP	3	Sekope Kepu	(substituted off) 38'
HK	2	Tatafu Polota-Nau	(substituted off) 56'
LP	1	Benn Robinson	(substituted off) 59'
Replacements:
HK	16	Stephen Moore	(substituted on) 56'
PR	17	Ben Alexander	(substituted on) 59'
LK	18	Dave Dennis	(substituted on) 65'
FL	19	Michael Hooper	(substituted on) 59'
SH	20	Nic White
CE	21	Anthony Fainga'a	(substituted on) 51'
CE	22	Mike Harris
Coach:
Robbie Deans

FB	15	Leigh Halfpenny
RW	14	Alex Cuthbert
OC	13	Jonathan Davies
IC	12	Scott Williams	(substituted off) 55'
LW	11	George North	(substituted off) 28'
FH	10	Rhys Priestland
SH	9	Mike Phillips
N8	8	Taulupe Faletau	(substituted off) 51'
OF	7	Sam Warburton (c)
BF	6	Dan Lydiate
RL	5	Luke Charteris	(substituted off) 51'
LL	4	Bradley Davies
TP	3	Adam Jones	(substituted off) 75'
HK	2	Ken Owens	(substituted off) 51'
LP	1	Gethin Jenkins
Replacements:
HK	16	Matthew Rees	(substituted on) 51'
PR	17	Paul James	(substituted on) 75'
LK	18	Alun Wyn Jones	(substituted on) 51'
N8	19	Ryan Jones	(substituted on) 51'
SH	20	Lloyd Williams
FH	21	James Hook	(substituted on) 28'
CE	22	Ashley Beck	(substituted on) 55'
Coach:
Rob Howley

Touch judges:
Keith Brown (New Zealand)
Garratt Williamson (New Zealand)
Television match official:
Vinny Munro (New Zealand)

Notes

- Cooper Vuna (Australia) and Ashley Beck (Wales) made their international debuts.

=== Second test ===
16 June 2012
20:00 AEST (UTC+10)

Australia	25–23	Wales
Try: Horne 38' c Con: Barnes (1/1) 39'; Pen: Barnes (5/6) 19', 29', 47', 58', 64'; Harris (1/1) 80'	Report	Try: North 4' c Davies 43' c Con: Halfpenny (2/2) 3', 44'; Pen: Halfpenny (3/3) 49', 60', 66'

Docklands Stadium, Melbourne
Attendance: 33,880
Referee: Chris Pollock (New Zealand)

FB	15	Adam Ashley-Cooper
RW	14	Cooper Vuna	(yellow card) 59'	(substituted off) 70'
OC	13	Rob Horne
IC	12	Pat McCabe
LW	11	Digby Ioane
FH	10	Berrick Barnes		(substituted off) 72'
SH	9	Will Genia
N8	8	Wycliff Palu		(substituted off) 54'
OF	7	David Pocock (c)
BF	6	Scott Higginbotham
RL	5	Nathan Sharpe
LL	4	Rob Simmons		(substituted off) 69'
TP	3	Sekope Kepu
HK	2	Tatafu Polota-Nau		(substituted off) 50'
LP	1	Benn Robinson		(substituted off) 64'
Replacements:
HK	16	Stephen Moore		(substituted on) 50'
PR	17	Ben Alexander		(substituted on) 64'
LK	18	Dave Dennis		(substituted on) 54'
FL	19	Michael Hooper		(substituted on) 69'
SH	20	Nic White
CE	21	Anthony Fainga'a		(substituted on) 70'
CE	22	Mike Harris		(substituted on) 72'
Coach:
Robbie Deans

FB	15	Leigh Halfpenny
RW	14	Alex Cuthbert
OC	13	Jonathan Davies
IC	12	Ashley Beck
LW	11	George North
FH	10	Rhys Priestland
SH	9	Mike Phillips	(substituted off) 65'
N8	8	Ryan Jones
OF	7	Sam Warburton (c)
BF	6	Dan Lydiate
RL	5	Alun Wyn Jones	(substituted off) 67'
LL	4	Bradley Davies
TP	3	Adam Jones
HK	2	Matthew Rees	(substituted off) 66'
LP	1	Gethin Jenkins
Replacements:
HK	16	Richard Hibbard	(substituted on) 66'
PR	17	Paul James
LK	18	Luke Charteris	(substituted on) 67'
FL	19	Justin Tipuric
SH	20	Rhys Webb	(substituted on) 65'
FH	21	James Hook
CE	22	Scott Williams
Coach:
Rob Howley

Touch judges:
Craig Joubert (South Africa)
Garratt Williamson (New Zealand)
Television match official:
Vinny Munro (New Zealand)

=== Third test ===
23 June 2012
15:00 AEST (UTC+10)

Australia	20–19	Wales
Try: Horne 64' m Pen: Barnes (5/5) 3', 9', 16', 38', 74'	Report	Try: R. Jones 60' c Con: Halfpenny (1/1) 61'; Pen: Halfpenny (4/5) 7', 13', 24', 70'

Sydney Football Stadium, Sydney
Attendance: 42,889
Referee: Craig Joubert (South Africa)

FB	15	Kurtley Beale
RW	14	Adam Ashley-Cooper
OC	13	Rob Horne
IC	12	Pat McCabe	(substituted off) 34'
LW	11	Digby Ioane
FH	10	Berrick Barnes
SH	9	Will Genia
N8	8	Wycliff Palu
OF	7	David Pocock (c)
BF	6	Scott Higginbotham	(substituted off) 56'
RL	5	Nathan Sharpe
LL	4	Sitaleki Timani	(substituted off) 72'
TP	3	Sekope Kepu	(substituted off) 56'
HK	2	Tatafu Polota-Nau	(substituted off) 56'
LP	1	Benn Robinson
Replacements:
HK	16	Stephen Moore	(substituted on) 56'
PR	17	Ben Alexander	(substituted on) 56'
LK	18	Rob Simmons	(substituted on) 72'
LK	19	Dave Dennis	(substituted on) 56'
FL	20	Michael Hooper
SH	21	Nic White
CE	22	Anthony Fainga'a	(substituted on) 34'
Coach:
Robbie Deans

FB	15	Leigh Halfpenny
RW	14	Alex Cuthbert
OC	13	Jonathan Davies
IC	12	Ashley Beck	(substituted off) 65'
LW	11	George North
FH	10	Rhys Priestland	(substituted off) 69'
SH	9	Mike Phillips
N8	8	Ryan Jones	(substituted off) 49'	(substituted on) 56'
OF	7	Sam Warburton (c)	(substituted off) 28'
BF	6	Dan Lydiate
RL	5	Alun Wyn Jones			(substituted off) 65'
LL	4	Bradley Davies
TP	3	Adam Jones
HK	2	Matthew Rees	(substituted off) 65'
LP	1	Gethin Jenkins	(substituted off) 40'
Replacements:
HK	16	Ken Owens	(substituted on) 65'
PR	17	Paul James	(substituted on) 40'
LK	18	Luke Charteris	(substituted on) 49'	(substituted off) 56'	(substituted on) 65'
FL	19	Justin Tipuric	(substituted on) 28'
SH	20	Rhys Webb
FH	21	James Hook	(substituted on) 69'
CE	22	Scott Williams	(substituted on) 65'
Coach:
Rob Howley

== See also ==
- 2012 mid-year rugby test series
- 2012 France rugby union tour of Argentina
- 2012 Scotland rugby union tour of Australia, Fiji and Samoa
- 2012 Ireland rugby union tour of New Zealand
- 2012 England rugby union tour of South Africa
