= 2010 Wales rugby union tour of New Zealand =

Rugby union series

- Date: 19–26 June 2010
- Coach: Warren Gatland
- Tour captain: Ryan Jones
- Top point scorer: Dan Carter (44 points)
- Top try scorer(s): Dan Carter; Cory Jane (2 tries)
- Top test point scorer(s): Stephen Jones; Leigh Halfpenny (6 points)
- Top test try scorer: Jamie Roberts (1 try)
Summary
P	W	D	L
Total
3	0	0	3
Opponent
P	W	D	L
New Zealand
2	0	0	2
South Africa
1	0	0	1

Tour chronology
- ← South Africa 2008 Australia 2012 →

In June 2010 Wales toured New Zealand in a two-test series. First in Dunedin, then in Hamilton. Before the series, New Zealand sat first in the World Rankings, while Wales sat at eighth. At the conclusion of the series, Wales dropped below Argentina, to ninth.

== Fixtures ==
During his team's tour of South Africa in 2008, Wales coach Warren Gatland expressed a desire to include matches against provincial teams when they visited New Zealand in 2010. A game against the NZ Māori was mooted, but no such fixtures were scheduled and the tour was limited to two test matches against the New Zealand national team. A pre-tour match against South Africa in Cardiff was confirmed in March 2010.

Date	Venue	Home	Score	Away
5 June 2010	Millennium Stadium, Cardiff	Wales	31–34	South Africa
19 June 2010	Carisbrook, Dunedin	New Zealand	42–9	Wales
26 June 2010	Waikato Stadium, Hamilton	New Zealand	29–10	Wales

== Matches ==
=== South Africa ===
5 June 2010
14:30

Wales	31–34	South Africa
Try: Hook 20' c Prydie 72' m A. W. Jones 77' c Con: S. Jones (2) 21', 77'; Pen: S. Jones (3) 8', 18', 45'; Drop: Hook 11'	Report	Try: Ndungane 30' m Potgieter 42' c De Jongh 59' c Con: Pienaar (2) 43', 59'; Pen: Pienaar (4) 16', 23', 35', 74'; Steyn 55'

Millennium Stadium, Cardiff
Attendance: 60,527
Referee: Alan Lewis (Ireland)

FB	15	Lee Byrne
RW	14	Leigh Halfpenny
OC	13	James Hook
IC	12	Jamie Roberts
LW	11	Tom Prydie
FH	10	Stephen Jones
SH	9	Mike Phillips
N8	8	Ryan Jones (c)
OF	7	Sam Warburton	(substituted off) 77'
BF	6	Jonathan Thomas
RL	5	Deiniol Jones	(substituted off) 57'
LL	4	Bradley Davies
TP	3	Adam Jones	(substituted off) 57'
HK	2	Matthew Rees
LP	1	Paul James
Substitutes:
HK	16	Huw Bennett
PR	17	John Yapp	(substituted on) 57'
LK	18	Alun Wyn Jones	(substituted on) 57'
FL	19	Rob McCusker	(substituted on) 77'
SH	20	Richie Rees
FH	21	Dan Biggar
CE	22	Andrew Bishop
Coach:
Warren Gatland

FB	15	François Steyn	(substituted off) 75'
RW	14	Gio Aplon
OC	13	Jaque Fourie
IC	12	Juan de Jongh
LW	11	Odwa Ndungane	(substituted off) 33'
FH	10	Ruan Pienaar
SH	9	Ricky Januarie
N8	8	Joe van Niekerk
OF	7	Dewald Potgieter	(substituted off) 55'
BF	6	Francois Louw
RL	5	Victor Matfield
LL	4	Danie Rossouw	(substituted off) 76'
TP	3	BJ Botha	(substituted off) 57'
HK	2	John Smit (c)
LP	1	CJ van der Linde	(substituted off) 74'
Substitutes:
HK	16	Chiliboy Ralepelle	(substituted on) 74'
PR	17	Jannie du Plessis	(substituted on) 57'
LK	18	Alistair Hargreaves	(substituted on) 76'
N8	19	Ryan Kankowski	(substituted on) 55'
FH	20	Meyer Bosman
FB	21	Zane Kirchner	(substituted on) 75'
WG	22	Bjorn Basson	(substituted on) 33'
Coach:
Peter de Villiers

=== First test ===
19 June 2010
19:35 NZST (UTC+12)

New Zealand	42–9	Wales
Try: Mealamu 18' c Jane 31' m Carter (2) 52' c, 68' c Kahui 71' c Con: Carter (4/5) 19', 53', 69', 72'; Pen: Carter (3/4) 24', 50', 63'	Report	Pen: Halfpenny (1/1) 15'; S. Jones (1/2) 34'; Drop: S. Jones (1/1) 3'

Carisbrook, Dunedin
Attendance: 29,000
Referee: George Clancy (Ireland)

FB	15	Israel Dagg
RW	14	Cory Jane
OC	13	Conrad Smith
IC	12	Benson Stanley
LW	11	Joe Rokocoko
FH	10	Dan Carter
SH	9	Jimmy Cowan
N8	8	Kieran Read
OF	7	Richie McCaw (c)
BF	6	Victor Vito
RL	5	Anthony Boric
LL	4	Brad Thorn
TP	3	Owen Franks
HK	2	Keven Mealamu
LP	1	Ben Franks
Substitutes:
HK	16	Aled de Malmanche
PR	17	Tony Woodcock
LK	18	Sam Whitelock
FL	19	Adam Thomson
SH	20	Piri Weepu
FH	21	Aaron Cruden
CE	22	Richard Kahui
Coach:
Graham Henry

FB	15	Lee Byrne
RW	14	Leigh Halfpenny
OC	13	Andrew Bishop
IC	12	Jamie Roberts
LW	11	Tom Prydie
FH	10	Stephen Jones
SH	9	Mike Phillips
N8	8	Ryan Jones (c)
OF	7	Gavin Thomas
BF	6	Jonathan Thomas
RL	5	Alun Wyn Jones
LL	4	Bradley Davies
TP	3	Adam Jones
HK	2	Matthew Rees
LP	1	Paul James
Substitutes:
HK	16	Huw Bennett
PR	17	John Yapp
LK	18	Deiniol Jones
FL	19	Rob McCusker
SH	20	Tavis Knoyle
FH	21	Dan Biggar
CE	22	Jonathan Davies
Coach:
Warren Gatland

=== Second test ===
26 June 2010
19:35 NZST (UTC+12)

New Zealand	29–10	Wales
Try: Jane 24'; Cruden 80'; Con: Carter (1/1) 25'; Weepu (1/1) 80'; Pen: Carter (5/5) 13', 40', 44', 51', 55'	Report	Try: Roberts 77' c Con: S. Jones (1/1) 78'; Pen: Halfpenny 3'

Waikato Stadium, Hamilton
Attendance: 20,000
Referee: Jonathan Kaplan (South Africa)

FB	15	Mils Muliaina
RW	14	Cory Jane
OC	13	Richard Kahui
IC	12	Benson Stanley
LW	11	Zac Guildford
FH	10	Dan Carter
SH	9	Jimmy Cowan
N8	8	Kieran Read
OF	7	Richie McCaw (c)
BF	6	Jerome Kaino
RL	5	Tom Donnelly
LL	4	Brad Thorn
TP	3	Neemia Tialata
HK	2	Keven Mealamu
LP	1	Tony Woodcock
Substitutes:
HK	16	Aled de Malmanche
PR	17	Owen Franks
LK	18	Sam Whitelock
FL	19	Adam Thomson
SH	20	Piri Weepu
FH	21	Aaron Cruden
WG	22	Rene Ranger
Coach:
Graham Henry

FB	15	Lee Byrne
RW	14	Leigh Halfpenny
OC	13	Jonathan Davies
IC	12	Jamie Roberts
LW	11	Tom Prydie
FH	10	Dan Biggar
SH	9	Mike Phillips
N8	8	Ryan Jones (c)
OF	7	Gavin Thomas
BF	6	Jonathan Thomas
RL	5	Alun Wyn Jones
LL	4	Bradley Davies
TP	3	Adam Jones
HK	2	Matthew Rees
LP	1	Paul James
Substitutes:
HK	16	Huw Bennett
PR	17	Craig Mitchell
LK	18	Deiniol Jones
FL	19	Rob McCusker
SH	20	Richie Rees
FH	21	Stephen Jones
WG	22	Will Harries
Coach:
Warren Gatland

== Squads ==
=== New Zealand ===
Note: Flags indicate national union for the club/province as defined by World Rugby.

Player	Position	Date of birth (age)	Caps	Club/province
Aled de Malmanche	Hooker	11 September 1984 (aged 25)	3	(New Zealand) Chiefs
Keven Mealamu	Hooker	20 March 1978 (aged 32)	72	(New Zealand) Blues
Ben Franks	Prop	27 March 1984 (aged 26)	1	(New Zealand) Crusaders
Owen Franks	Prop	23 December 1987 (aged 22)	10	(New Zealand) Crusaders
Neemia Tialata	Prop	15 July 1982 (aged 27)	42	(New Zealand) Hurricanes
Tony Woodcock	Prop	27 January 1981 (aged 29)	61	(New Zealand) Blues
Anthony Boric	Lock	27 December 1983 (aged 26)	14	(New Zealand) Blues
Tom Donnelly	Lock	1 October 1981 (aged 28)	6	(New Zealand) Highlanders
Brad Thorn	Lock	3 February 1975 (aged 35)	38	(New Zealand) Crusaders
Sam Whitelock	Lock	12 October 1988 (aged 21)	1	(New Zealand) Crusaders
Jerome Kaino	Flanker	6 April 1983 (aged 27)	26	(New Zealand) Blues
Richie McCaw (c)	Flanker	31 December 1980 (aged 29)	81	(New Zealand) Crusaders
Adam Thomson	Flanker	23 March 1982 (aged 28)	15	(New Zealand) Highlanders
Victor Vito	Flanker	27 March 1987 (aged 23)	1	(New Zealand) Hurricanes
Kieran Read	Number 8	26 October 1985 (aged 24)	17	(New Zealand) Crusaders
Jimmy Cowan	Scrum-half	6 March 1982 (aged 28)	34	(New Zealand) Highlanders
Piri Weepu	Scrum-half	7 September 1983 (aged 26)	36	(New Zealand) Hurricanes
Dan Carter	Fly-half	5 March 1982 (aged 28)	67	(New Zealand) Crusaders
Aaron Cruden	Fly-half	8 January 1989 (aged 21)	1	(New Zealand) Hurricanes
Richard Kahui	Centre	9 June 1985 (aged 25)	8	(New Zealand) Chiefs
Conrad Smith	Centre	12 October 1981 (aged 28)	34	(New Zealand) Hurricanes
Benson Stanley	Centre	11 September 1984 (aged 25)	0	(New Zealand) Blues
Zac Guildford	Wing	8 February 1989 (aged 21)	2	(New Zealand) Crusaders

=== Wales ===
Note: Flags indicate national union for the club/province as defined by World Rugby.

Player	Position	Date of birth (age)	Caps	Club/province
Huw Bennett	Hooker	11 June 1983 (aged 27)	32	(Wales) Ospreys
Ken Owens	Hooker	3 January 1987 (aged 23)	0	(Wales) Scarlets
Matthew Rees	Hooker	9 December 1980 (aged 29)	36	(Wales) Scarlets
Paul James	Prop	13 May 1982 (aged 28)	10	(Wales) Ospreys
Adam Jones	Prop	8 March 1981 (aged 29)	61	(Wales) Ospreys
Craig Mitchell	Prop	3 May 1986 (aged 24)	3	(Wales) Ospreys
John Yapp	Prop	9 April 1983 (aged 27)	14	(Wales) Cardiff Blues
Bradley Davies	Lock	9 January 1987 (aged 23)	10	(Wales) Cardiff Blues
Ian Gough	Lock	10 November 1976 (aged 33)	63	(Wales) Ospreys
Alun Wyn Jones	Lock	19 September 1985 (aged 24)	37	(Wales) Ospreys
Deiniol Jones	Lock	18 November 1977 (aged 32)	8	(Wales) Cardiff Blues
Rob McCusker	Flanker	12 October 1985 (aged 24)	0	(Wales) Scarlets
Gavin Thomas	Flanker	22 October 1977 (aged 32)	22	(Wales) Newport Gwent Dragons
Jonathan Thomas	Flanker	27 December 1982 (aged 27)	55	(Wales) Ospreys
Ryan Jones (c)	Number 8	13 March 1981 (aged 29)	40	(Wales) Ospreys
Tavis Knoyle	Scrum-half	2 June 1990 (aged 20)	0	(Wales) Scarlets
Mike Phillips	Scrum-half	29 August 1982 (aged 27)	39	(Wales) Ospreys
Richie Rees	Scrum-half	21 May 1983 (aged 27)	4	(Wales) Cardiff Blues
Dan Biggar	Fly-half	16 October 1989 (aged 20)	4	(Wales) Ospreys
Stephen Jones	Fly-half	8 December 1977 (aged 32)	88	(Wales) Scarlets
Andrew Bishop	Centre	7 August 1985 (aged 24)	10	(Wales) Ospreys
Jonathan Davies	Centre	5 April 1988 (aged 22)	5	(Wales) Scarlets
Jamie Roberts	Centre	8 November 1986 (aged 23)	21	(Wales) Cardiff Blues
Leigh Halfpenny	Wing	22 December 1988 (aged 21)	14	(Wales) Cardiff Blues
Will Harries	Wing	30 March 1987 (aged 23)	0	(Wales) Newport Gwent Dragons
Tom Prydie	Wing	23 February 1992 (aged 18)	1	(Wales) Ospreys
Lee Byrne	Fullback	1 June 1980 (aged 30)	32	(Wales) Ospreys

Extended squad

Note: Flags indicate national union for the club/province as defined by World Rugby.

Player	Position	Date of birth (age)	Caps	Club/province
T. Rhys Thomas	Hooker	23 April 1982 (aged 28)	27	(Wales) Cardiff Blues
Scott Andrews	Prop	1 August 1989 (aged 20)	0	(Wales) Cardiff Blues
Martin Roberts	Scrum-half	6 June 1986 (aged 24)	3	(Wales) Scarlets
Jason Tovey	Fly-half	28 April 1989 (aged 21)	0	(Wales) Newport Gwent Dragons
Chris Czekaj	Wing	14 December 1985 (aged 24)	7	(Wales) Cardiff Blues
