= Ken Owens =

Welsh rugby union player (born 1987)

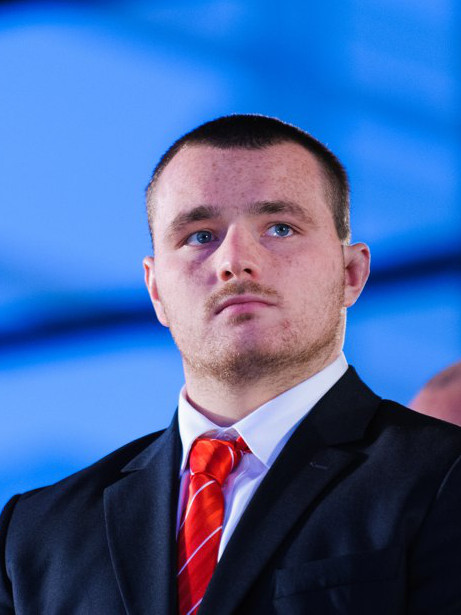
- Owens at the Wales Grand Slam Celebration, 19 March 2012
- Born: Kenneth James Owens; 3 January 1987 (age 39) Carmarthen, Wales
- Height: 1.83 m (6 ft 0 in)
- Weight: 109 kg (240 lb; 17 st 2 lb)
- School: Ysgol Gyfun Gymraeg Bro Myrddin
- University: UWIC

Rugby union career
- Position: Hooker
- Current team: Scarlets
Senior career
Years	Team	Apps	(Points)
- Carmarthen Athletic
- UWIC
2006–2008	Llanelli RFC	11	(15)
2006–2023	Scarlets	270	(110)
2010	Carmarthen Quins	1	(0)
2022	Carmarthen Quins	1	(0)
- Correct as of 23:53, 28 January 2023 (UTC)
International career
Years	Team	Apps	(Points)
2006	Wales U19	2	(5)
2011–2023	Wales	91	(30)
2017, 2021	British & Irish Lions	5	(5)
- Correct as of 18 March 2023

Kenneth James Owens (born 3 January 1987) is a former Welsh rugby union player who played as a hooker for the Scarlets and Wales. He made his debut for the Scarlets in 2006, taking over from Matthew Rees as their first-choice hooker upon Rees' departure for the Cardiff Blues in 2013. He also served as backup to Rees, among others, for Wales following his debut against Namibia at the 2011 Rugby World Cup. In 2016, he took over as Wales' first-choice hooker, and in January 2023, following almost a year out with a back injury, he was named as captain for the 2023 Six Nations Championship.

== Early life ==
Owens is the son of Delme Owens, a former rugby player who played for Carmarthen Athletic RFC as a second row and later became the club's president; along with his wife Frankie, he also ran the club's junior section. His maternal grandparents, Kenneth Bryan Maynard and Sarah Mary Lorraine Maynard, were both mayors of Carmarthen, and Kenneth also served as chairman of Dyfed County Council, leading to Owens being given the nickname "The Sheriff" by Scarlets teammate and future coach Dwayne Peel in Owens' first season with the Scarlets. Owens attended Ysgol Gyfun Gymraeg Bro Myrddin, and is a fluent Welsh speaker. Although he was almost signed as a goalkeeper by Carmarthen Town AFC, Owens chose to stick to rugby and began his career as a youth player at Carmarthen Athletic before joining the Llanelli Scarlets academy in 2004. He moved to play his club rugby for UWIC RFC when he began studying at the university in 2005.

== Club career ==
=== 2006–2013: Backup ===
Owens made his debut for the Llanelli Scarlets towards the end of the 2005–06 season in a match against the Glasgow Warriors. He left UWIC and began playing his club rugby for Llanelli RFC, making five appearances and scoring three tries in the first two months of the 2006–07 season. That year, Owens made 17 appearances for the Scarlets, making his first start in a 24–14 away defeat to Edinburgh on 5 January 2007. He scored his first try after coming on for Matthew Rees in a Celtic League match against Border Reivers. With Rees at the 2007 Rugby World Cup and Aled Gravelle out with a foot injury, Owens began the 2007–08 season competing with James Hayter to be the Scarlets' starting hooker. He was a replacement for the first five games of the season and started against Ulster on 12 October 2007, but Rees' return and a knee injury meant he did not play again until the end of February 2008, even then only playing three times in the second half of the season.

In 2008–09, Owens and Rees between them started all but two of the Scarlets' matches, though Rees took the lion's share, while Owens had to be content with starting mostly in the Anglo-Welsh Cup or while Rees was on international duty with Wales, during the 2008 Autumn internationals and the 2009 Six Nations. He scored his second try for the Scarlets on one of those starts, the only try in a 13–6 win over Edinburgh on 8 March 2009.

With Rees on tour with the British & Irish Lions in South Africa, Owens began the 2009–10 season as the Scarlets' first-choice hooker, and in the third game of the season in September 2009, he gave a man-of-the-match performance in a 22–20 home defeat to Munster. In December 2009, Owens signed a new contract with the Scarlets, committing himself to the region until 2013. He missed only two games throughout the season due to Rees' Wales commitments, starting in all but six of his appearances, and scoring a try in a 27–14 loss away to Leinster on 20 February 2010.

In 2010–11, Owens served as back-up to Rees, taking advantage of Rees' absence with Wales to start in six out of seven matches during the 2010 Autumn internationals; however, he suffered a recurrence of a neck injury in late 2010, and underwent surgery in January 2011 that ruled him out for the next four months. He recovered in time to be named on the bench for the Scarlets' 38–23 final-day win over the Cardiff Blues, but he did not come on.

Owens was called up to the Wales training camp ahead of the 2011 Rugby World Cup at the start of the 2011–12 season, but his recent recovery from injury meant he was down the pecking order and was released to play for the Scarlets in their pre-season matches against Rotherham Titans and Clermont; however, his selection in the final squad for the World Cup meant he did not make his first start of 2011 until 29 October, in a 24–17 win over Ulster. He competed with Rees for the starting hooker job throughout the season, though Rees was more often selected for the Scarlets' Heineken Cup campaign. Owens scored his first Heineken Cup try after coming off the bench for Rees against Munster on 18 December 2011, securing a bonus point for the Scarlets, and his only start in the competition that season came in the Scarlets' final pool match, a 16–13 away win over Castres that saw them qualify for the quarter-finals of the Challenge Cup.

In 2012–13, Owens started just two of the Scarlets' eight games before he was called up to the Wales team for the 2012 Autumn internationals. He returned on the bench for their Heineken Cup match against Exeter on 8 December, before starting the return fixture at Sandy Park a week later. He scored a try in the match, which the Scarlets lost 30–20, but suffered popped rib cartilage that ruled him out for the next three matches. He returned in time to start both of the Scarlets' Heineken Cup double-header against Leinster and Clermont, before missing the next seven matches on Wales duty. On 11 March 2013, following the announcement of Rees' departure for the Cardiff Blues, Owens signed a contract extension with the Scarlets that would keep him with the region until 2016.

=== 2013–2023: First choice ===
Rees' departure meant Owens began the 2013–14 season as the Scarlets' first-choice hooker, and he started four of their first five games of the campaign; however, a combination of an abdominal injury suffered ahead of their first Heineken Cup game against Harlequins and a call-up to the Wales team for the 2013 Autumn internationals meant he missed the next eight games, making his return in the Heineken Cup double-header against Clermont at the start of December. He suffered another injury in the Scarlets' Boxing Day loss to rivals the Ospreys, coming off with a calf problem just before half-time in a 10–6 loss. He was originally due to make a comeback off the bench in the Scarlets' final Heineken Cup pool match against Harlequins on 19 January, but Kirby Myhill ended up being named in the matchday squad as the Scarlets lost 22–20 to finish third in the pool. Owens' subsequent selection for the 2014 Six Nations meant he did not play again for the Scarlets until the end of March. He started five of the last six games of the season, scoring tries in three straight games against Zebre, the Blues and the Dragons, with victory in the last of those three seeing the Scarlets qualify for the 2014–15 Champions Cup.

Ahead of the 2014–15 season, reports emerged that Owens was one of nine players due to be offered a central contract with the Welsh Rugby Union (WRU), in addition to already contracted national team captain Sam Warburton; however, Owens said he had not "spoken to anybody about it". Owens was appointed as the Scarlets' captain for the 2014–15 season, taking over from co-captains Jonathan Davies, who had left for Clermont Auvergne, and Rob McCusker; however, just two games into the season, Owens suffered a neck injury that required surgery that initially ruled him out until after the 2014 Autumn internationals. Owens hoped to make a return from the injury for the Scarlets' game against the Ospreys on 27 December, but nerve damage meant he ended up missing a further month, making his return against London Irish in the Anglo-Welsh Cup. During his time out, he signed a new contract with the Scarlets, ending speculation that the WRU would need to sign him to a National Dual Contract to prevent him chasing a move outside Wales. After being rested for the Scarlets' final Anglo-Welsh Cup match against Sale Sharks, Owens missed just one of the last nine games of the season, again scoring back-to-back tries against the Dragons and Blues; his try against the Dragons was controversially awarded after he collided with referee George Clancy, who appeared to impede Dragons defenders from bringing Owens down. After the game, Owens said he was feeling the pressure of the possibility that he could become the first Scarlets captain to fail to qualify for the Champions Cup. Victory over the Blues and over Treviso on the final day of the season meant they finished in sixth place and qualified for the Champions Cup.

The 2015–16 season saw Owens have reduced opportunities with the Scarlets due to his involvement with the Wales team at the World Cup at the start of the season, as well as the Autumn internationals and the Six Nations. Nevertheless, he started 13 matches in all competitions, plus another two substitute appearances, and scored a try in the 29–27 loss to the Cardiff Blues on 1 January 2016. In 2016–17, the Scarlets recovered from three straight defeats at the start of the Pro12 campaign to lose just twice more all season, finishing third in the league and qualifying for the play-offs. Owens started 12 of the team's 22 league matches, scoring a try in the 51–5 win over Benetton Treviso on 8 April, his 200th appearance for the region, but missed out on the play-offs due to an ankle injury; the Scarlets went on to beat Leinster 27–15 in the semi-finals, before a 46–22 win over Munster in the final to give the Scarlets their second league title. With his contract due to expire at the end of the season, Owens was linked with a move to French club Pau, before signing a new deal with the Scarlets in February 2017.

Following his involvement in the British & Irish Lions' tour to New Zealand in the summer of 2017, Owens missed the first two games of the Scarlets' 2017–18 season, returning to the side for their trip to Ulster on 15 September 2017; Ulster won the match 27–20 to deny the Scarlets a 10th straight win in the Pro14. Owens' involvement with the Wales team again meant that he missed around half the Scarlets' games during the season, though he played in all eight of their 2017–18 European Rugby Champions Cup matches (starting seven) as they reached the semi-finals, where they were beaten 38–16 by Leinster in Dublin. The Scarlets also finished second in the Pro14, and Owens played in all three of their play-off matches, culminating with another meeting with Leinster in the final, which they lost 40–32.

In January 2019, the Scarlets suffered a back row injury crisis that resulted in Owens having to play at number 8 against the Dragons in the Pro14 on 5 January, and because of European registration regulations, against Leinster in the Champions Cup on 12 January, scoring one of the Scarlets' five tries in a 33–10 win. Scarlets coach Wayne Pivac praised Owens' performance in an unfamiliar position. Owens signed a new contract with the Scarlets in March 2019. Despite missing long spells of the season due to Wales involvement, Owens returned to action for the Scarlets in April 2019, but he was unable to help them into the European qualification spots; a 34–32 loss to the Dragons in the Judgement Day event at the Millennium Stadium meant the Scarlets finished fourth in their Pro14 conference, forcing a play-off against the Ospreys to determine which side would qualify for the Champions Cup. The Ospreys won the play-off 21–10, ending the Scarlets' run of qualifying for the top-tier European competition every year since their inception. At the end of the season, Owens was named in the Pro14 team of the year.

Owens retained the role of Scarlets captain for the 2019–20 season, his sixth year in the role; that set a new record for the regional side and equalled Phil Bennett's run as captain of Llanelli RFC between 1973 and 1979. After playing at the 2019 Rugby World Cup, Owens returned to action for the Scarlets in their Pro14 meeting with the Dragons on 21 December 2019, which the Dragons won 22–20. However, he only played four more games (three as a starter) before being called up for Wales duty in the 2020 Six Nations, which was later interrupted by the COVID-19 pandemic, stopping all rugby until August 2020. Owens played in all three of the Scarlets' remaining matches, confirming their qualification for the 2020–21 Champions Cup with wins over the Blues and the Dragons in the league, the latter marking his 250th appearance for the Scarlets, before losing to Toulon in the quarter-finals of the European Challenge Cup.

After being appointed as the players' representative on the Scarlets' board, as well as being named to the International Rugby Players council, Owens began a seventh straight year as captain in 2020–21, breaking the Llanelli record held by Phil Bennett. However, he played just two matches before requiring surgery on a shoulder injury sustained against Glasgow on 11 October 2020 that would rule him out for 3–4 months. He returned to action in January 2021, taking part in the Scarlets' warm-up ahead of their game against the Dragons on 2 January, before being named in the line-up for their 13–10 loss to the Blues on 22 January. After returning from Six Nations duty, Owens played just three more games for the Scarlets, first in their 57–14 loss to Sale Sharks in the round of 16 of the Champions Cup, in which he scored the first of the Scarlets' two consolation tries, before back-to-back appearances against the Ospreys and the Blues in the Pro14 Rainbow Cup, the latter off the bench. Owens' selection in the British & Irish Lions squad meant he was rested for the next game against Ulster, but this match ended up being cancelled due to an outbreak of COVID-19 in the Ulster squad.

Jonathan Davies was named captain of the Scarlets for the 2021–22 season, ending Owens' run of seven straight years in the role, though Owens signed a new contract with the Scarlets, keeping him with the region until after the 2023 Rugby World Cup. Owens' involvement in the Lions' tour to South Africa during the summer meant he missed the start of the Scarlets' season, and played just twice before being named in the Wales squad for the 2021 Autumn internationals, making his comeback in a 43–10 loss at home to a second-string Munster side. While on Wales duty, Owens was diagnosed with a prolapsed disc in his back and returned to the Scarlets for treatment. He was later ruled out until after the Six Nations, before his season was declared over in April 2022, with coach Dwayne Peel saying he was "nowhere near a return to training".

In September 2022, Peel said Owens was in contention to return to action by that November. After 11 months out injured, he made his return to rugby with Scarlets feeder club Carmarthen Quins on 24 September 2022. He played his first game for the Scarlets in just under a year the following week, coming off the bench at half-time in a 34–23 loss to Treviso. He was again a replacement the following week against Cardiff, before making his first start in a year on 15 October, in a 36–12 home win over Zebre, the Scarlets' first win of the season. After the 2022 Autumn internationals, Ryan Elias was preferred for the Scarlets' Challenge Cup matches against Bayonne and the Cheetahs, as well as their United Rugby Championship match against the Ospreys on Boxing Day, but Owens returned to the starting line-up for the first four games of 2023 before being named captain of Wales for the Six Nations, which meant he would not play for the Scarlets again until the end of March.

== International career ==
=== Youth international ===
Owens began his international career playing for Wales at both under-19 and under-20 level. He scored the first try for the new under-20 side in their first match in the Under-21 Six Nations against Ireland on 2 February 2007; Wales went on to lose the match 17–15. He received a yellow card for stamping in the first half of Wales' 39–13 loss to France, and was then left out of the side for their 22–21 loss to Italy, before returning as a replacement for a 21–21 draw with England in the final game.

=== 2009–2011: First call-ups and debut ===
In September 2009, following a good run of form at the start of the 2009–10 season, former Wales scrum-half Robert Jones named Owens as a "serious contender" to make his senior Wales debut in the 2009 Autumn internationals; however, Wales coach Warren Gatland picked only two hookers for the series, omitting Owens, which Jones described as "surprising". Owens was again left out of the Wales squad for the 2010 Six Nations when it was announced in January 2010; however, due to injuries to hookers Matthew Rees and Gareth Williams, Owens was added to the squad on 15 February as backup to Ospreys hooker Huw Bennett ahead of the game against France. Owens was named on the bench for the game, but did not come on. In May 2010, Owens was again called up to the Wales squad as one of three hookers for their summer tour to New Zealand and their warm-up match against South Africa in Cardiff. Before the South Africa match, he was called up to the Barbarians squad for their match against England on 30 May. He was named on the bench for the match, coming on for Benoît August for the final 10 minutes as the Barbarians lost 35–26. Matthew Rees and Huw Bennett played in all three of Wales' summer tests, leaving Owens still without a cap, a run that continued through the 2010 Autumn internationals and the 2011 Six Nations, when Rees, Bennett and Richard Hibbard were preferred.

As Wales began their preparations for the 2011 Rugby World Cup, Owens was left out of their squad for a match against the Barbarians in May 2011, with Bennett, Hibbard and Lloyd Burns the preferred trio of hookers. When Gatland announced his 45-man squad for the World Cup training camp in June 2011, Owens was again overlooked in favour of Matthew Rees' return to the squad; however, when Hibbard underwent shoulder surgery later that month, ruling him out for 10–12 weeks, Owens was added to the squad as cover for their first of two week-long trips to Spała, Poland. He was not included for the second visit to Spała, which only featured 35 players, but rejoined the group when it was expanded to 39 players for their first World Cup warm-up matches against England on 6 and 13 August. He was not selected for the first match, and was allowed to return to the Scarlets for pre-season match practice. Rees was ruled out of the tournament with a neck injury, leaving Owens competing against Bennett, Burns and a recovering Hibbard for a place as one of three hookers in the final 30-man squad, to be announced on 22 August. Bennett and Hibbard played in the final warm-up match against Argentina on 20 August, but Hibbard suffered an ankle injury, resulting in Owens' selection for the tournament alongside Bennett and Burns. Owens made his debut for Wales in their third pool match at the tournament on 26 September 2011, coming on as a second-half replacement in an 81–7 win over Namibia.

=== 2012–2016: Backup ===
With Burns ruled out with a neck injury, Owens was named alongside Rees and Bennett as Wales' hookers for the 2012 Six Nations. In the week before the opening game, Rees suffered a calf strain, ruling him out for the first two matches, which meant Bennett would start the opening game against Ireland, with Owens on the bench; however, Owens did not come on as Wales won 23–21. Bennett again started the match against Scotland the following week, but this time Owens was able to make his Six Nations debut, first coming on as a temporary blood replacement for Bennett in the 10th minute, before a permanent substitution at half-time; Wales won the match 27–13. Like Rees, Bennett suffered a calf injury during the game, resulting in Hibbard being recalled to the squad for the Triple Crown game against England on 25 February. Owens was picked to start the game, his first start for Wales, with Hibbard on the bench. Owens played the whole match as Wales won 19–12 to claim the Triple Crown and continue a Grand Slam bid. Rees' return from injury meant Owens dropped to the bench again for Wales' next game against Italy, coming on for the final 18 minutes of a 24–3 win, before retaining his place on the bench for the final game against France, in which he played the final 17 minutes as Wales won their third Grand Slam of the Six Nations era. Owens was picked along with Hibbard and Rees for Wales' 2012 tour of Australia. He was left out of the pre-tour match against the Barbarians, but was given his second start for Wales in the first test against Australia; he played the first 50 minutes before being replaced by Rees as Wales lost 27–19. He came on for the last 10 minutes of the 25–15 win over the ACT Brumbies on 12 June, before being left out entirely for the second test on 16 June, which Australia won 25–23 to claim the series. He was named on the bench for the third test, coming on for the final 15 minutes as Wales lost 20–19.

In October 2012, in the absence of Bennett, Owens was named in the Wales squad for the 2012 Autumn internationals, along with Rees and Hibbard. He missed the opening match against Argentina on 10 November, as Rees and Hibbard were preferred, before being named as a replacement behind Hibbard for the game against Samoa on 16 November. Hibbard suffered a shoulder injury early in the game, so Owens played the remaining 60 minutes. Hibbard's injury ruled him out of the rest of the series, so Owens was named on the bench behind Rees for the final two games against New Zealand and Australia, coming on for the final 15 minutes of each game. Despite suffering a rib injury playing for the Scarlets in December 2012, Owens recovered in time for the start of the 2013 Six Nations, and featured as a replacement in all five matches – behind Rees for the first game against Ireland, before backing up Hibbard for the final four – as Wales claimed their second title in a row. Later in the season, Owens suffered a neck injury playing for the Scarlets in the Pro12 semi-final, ruling him out of Wales' summer tour of Japan.

He returned for the 2013 Autumn internationals, playing in all four matches. He scored his first international try after coming off the bench against Argentina on 16 November, before starting the match against Tonga the following week. He was again selected for the 2014 Six Nations as one of three hookers, along with the Ospreys' Richard Hibbard and Scarlets teammate Emyr Phillips. Owens played in all five matches, coming off the bench in the first four before starting the final match against Scotland. Hibbard underwent shoulder surgery following the tournament, ruling him out of the summer tour of South Africa; this allowed Owens – who suffered a minor injury playing for the Probables side in a pre-tour trial match – to hold onto his role as the starting hooker, having been named alongside Matthew Rees and Scott Baldwin as the three hookers on tour. Rees and Baldwin played in the tour match against Eastern Province Kings, but Owens started both tests against South Africa; his try in the second helped Wales to a 30–17 lead going into the final 10 minutes, but South Africa came back to win 31–30.

Due to a neck injury suffered early in the 2014–15 season, Owens was ruled out of Wales' 2014 Autumn internationals, and was left out of Warren Gatland's initial squad for the 2015 Six Nations. Following a successful return to club action, he was recalled to the Wales squad for their penultimate Six Nations match against Ireland, but was ultimately not selected for the match. Richard Hibbard was ruled out of Wales' final match of the tournament against Italy, allowing Owens to take his place on the bench. Owens came on in the 56th minute as Wales won the match 60–21 to finish the tournament level on points with champions Ireland and second-placed England.

Owens was one of four hookers named in Wales' initial 47-man training squad ahead of the 2015 Rugby World Cup, and despite being left out of their first warm-up match against Ireland on 8 August 2015, he survived the first cut a week later. He then started the return match against Ireland on 29 August, after which he was named as one of two hookers in the final 31-man squad. He started the final warm-up against Italy on 5 September, but then did not start any of the matches at the tournament, coming off the bench to replace Scott Baldwin in all four pool matches and the 23–19 loss to South Africa in the quarter-finals.

=== 2016–2022: Starter ===
Owens remained behind Baldwin in the pecking order for the 2016 Six Nations, coming off the bench in all five matches as Wales finished second behind England. In the summer, he was selected for Wales' tour of New Zealand. Though he was left out of the warm-up match against England, he started all three tests against the All Blacks, all of which Wales lost. From that point, Owens became Wales' first-choice hooker, starting the matches against Australia, Argentina and South Africa during the 2016 Autumn internationals, and scoring Wales' opening try – his third at international level – in the South Africa match, which Wales won 27–13. He then started all five matches in the 2017 Six Nations, including earning his 50th cap in a 20–18 loss to France on the final day; he played the entire game, including the 20 minutes of injury time at the end of the second half.

Owens' form for Wales led to him being suggested as a potential selection for the British & Irish Lions' 2017 tour to New Zealand. When the squad was announced in April 2017, Owens was on holiday in Pembrokeshire. He was named as one of three hookers along with England's Jamie George and Ireland's Rory Best. Despite suffering an injury on club duty in May 2017, Owens was expected to be fit for the start of the tour. Although he was able to travel with the rest of the squad, and led them in the singing of Welsh hymn "Calon Lân" on arrival at Auckland airport, he ultimately missed the first match of the tour against the New Zealand Barbarians, he returned to captain the side in the second match against the Blues, which the Lions lost 22–16. He was on the bench for the next three games against the Crusaders (won 12–3), the Highlanders (lost 23–22) and the Māori All Blacks (won 32–10), before being rested against the Chiefs ahead of the first test on 24 June. Owens was named on the bench for the first test, coming on for George for the final 13 minutes as the Lions lost 30–15. He was again rested for the final tour match against the Hurricanes, before again being named as a replacement for the second test; however, this time he did not come on as the Lions won 24–21. Again a replacement for the third test, he came on for the final 11 minutes with New Zealand leading 15–12. After a penalty from Owen Farrell levelled the scores with three minutes to go, Owens was penalised for being accidentally offside; referee Romain Poite originally awarded a penalty that would have given the All Blacks the chance to win the game, but he overturned his decision on review and awarded a scrum instead, and both the match and the series finished as draws.

Owens played in just two of Wales' tests in the 2017 Autumn internationals, against Australia and New Zealand, before playing in all five of their 2018 Six Nations matches, albeit coming off the bench for the penultimate match against Italy. He was omitted from the squad for Wales' summer tour of the Americas to allow him to rest after playing on the Lions tour the previous summer, before returning to play in three of Wales' four Autumn internationals in 2018. In the 2019 Six Nations, Owens played in four of Wales' five matches as they won the Grand Slam for the first time in seven years. In the opening match against France, Owens earned his 61st cap, making him Wales' most-capped hooker of all time, surpassing the record held by Matthew Rees.

In April 2019, Owens was named in a 42-man extended training squad ahead of the 2019 Rugby World Cup. He started both warm-up games against England in August 2019, the second of which saw Wales rise to number 1 in the World Rugby Rankings, and came off the bench in the second of two matches against Ireland. Between the two Ireland games, Wales confirmed their 31-man squad for the World Cup, which included Owens as one of three hookers along with Elliot Dee and Scarlets teammate Ryan Elias. Owens started each of Wales' first three Pool D matches, winning all of them, including a six-try victory over Georgia and a 29–25 win over Australia, although he was sin-binned early in the game against Fiji for a dangerous tackle. With Wales' qualification for the knockout stage secure, he was then rested for the final pool game against Uruguay. He was restored to the starting line-up for Wales' run to fourth place in the tournament, starting with a 20–19 win over France in the quarter-finals, followed by consecutive losses to South Africa in the semi-finals and New Zealand in the bronze final.

After Warren Gatland stepped down as Wales coach following the World Cup, Owens' former Scarlets coach and Gatland's fellow New Zealander Wayne Pivac took over. Owens was named in Pivac's first squad for an uncapped match against a Barbarians side coached by Gatland. Owens scored a try either side of the half-time break to help give Wales a 43–33 win. In the 2020 Six Nations, Owens started each of Wales' first four matches before the competition was interrupted by the COVID-19 pandemic. However, a shoulder injury suffered on his return to club action ruled him out of a friendly against France and the COVID-postponed Six Nations match against Scotland in October 2020. He made his return in January 2021, just in time to be named in the Wales squad for the 2021 Six Nations. He was named in the starting line-up for the opening match against Ireland, his first start for Wales in 11 months, and played the full 80 minutes as they came from behind to win 21–16. He started each of the four remaining matches, scoring two tries against Italy in week 4 of the tournament, helping Wales to a 48–7 away win. Although Wales missed out on the Grand Slam after losing to France in their final match on 20 March, they won their second title in three years when France lost to Scotland a week later in their match that had been postponed from 28 February.

Owens was again selected for the Lions for their 2021 tour to South Africa. After taking part in a pre-tour training camp in Jersey, he started the home match against Japan at Murrayfield, playing almost 55 minutes before being replaced by Jamie George. He was left out for the team's first match in South Africa against the Lions, before being restored to the bench for the next two games, both against the Sharks. He then started the Lions' game against South Africa A, playing for 50 minutes as the Lions suffered their first loss on tour. He was then rested for the final tour match against the Stormers, ahead of being named on the bench for the first test a week later. He came on for try-scorer Luke Cowan-Dickie in the 56th minute as the Lions won 22–17. Despite Cowan-Dickie's struggles at the line-out, he retained his place in the team ahead of Owens for the second test, who again came on around 15 minutes into the second half, as South Africa levelled the series with a 27–9 win. Owens then started the final test, his first start out of five caps for the Lions, with Cowan-Dickie on the bench. He scored the game's opening try in the 18th minute to help the Lions to a 10–6 half-time lead; however, he was substituted in the 53rd minute, after which South Africa came back to win the match 19–16, and hence the series 2–1.

Upon his return to Wales, Owens was named in their squad for the 2021 Autumn internationals, and was picked to start the opening game against New Zealand on 30 October 2021, only to be ruled out by a back injury, though he was expected to be fit again for Wales' second game against South Africa; however, he missed that game as well, and on 8 November 2021, he was released from the Wales squad. He missed the remainder of the series, and in January 2022, he was also ruled out of the Six Nations, before his season was ended completely in April 2022, eliminating him from contention for Wales' tour to South Africa in the summer.

In June 2022, Owens said he still hoped to play at the 2023 Rugby World Cup, and that September, he was considered eligible to play in the 2022 Autumn internationals that November. He returned to club action later that month, and on 25 October 2022, he was named in the Wales squad for their series of matches against New Zealand, Argentina, Georgia and Australia. He was picked to start against New Zealand, his first start for Wales in more than 18 months, and played over an hour as Wales lost 55–23. He missed out on a try against Argentina the following week, knocking on over the try line under pressure from Thomas Gallo. Injuries forced him to play the full 80 minutes against Argentina, and when Elias came on for Will Rowlands late in the game, rather than Owens filling-in, in the back row, as he had done for the Scarlets a few years earlier, he continued to pack down at hooker, while Elias played as an emergency flanker. He then played all but the final 10 minutes in a 13–12 loss to Georgia the following week, followed by another start against Australia in the last match of the series. Owens was replaced by Elias in the 65th minute, but when Elias was sin-binned a few minutes later, Owens had to return to the field in place of Alex Cuthbert for the final five minutes; with captain Justin Tipuric earlier also going to the sin bin, Australia scored four tries in the second half to come back from 34–13 down and win 39–34.

=== 2023: Captain and Retire ===
Ahead of the 2023 Six Nations, Owens was selected by returning coach Warren Gatland as the Wales captain, taking over from Tipuric, who had led the side in the 2022 Autumn internationals. His first match against Ireland on 4 February 2023 made him Wales' oldest ever captain; however, Ireland won the match 34–10, with Owens replaced by Scott Baldwin after an hour. A week later, Owens scored Wales' only try in a 35–7 loss to Scotland, coming off in the 64th minute.

=== International tries ===
==== Wales ====
Try	Opponent	Location	Venue	Competition	Date	Result
1	Argentina	Cardiff, Wales	Millennium Stadium	2013 Autumn Internationals	November 16, 2013	Win
2	South Africa	Nelspruit, South Africa	Mbombela Stadium	2014 Summer Internationals	June 21, 2014	Loss
3	South Africa	Cardiff, Wales	Millennium Stadium	2016 Autumn Internationals	November 26, 2016	Win
4	Italy	Rome, Italy	Stadio Olimpico	2021 Six Nations	March 13, 2021	Win
5	Italy	Rome, Italy	Stadio Olimpico	2021 Six Nations	March 13, 2021	Win
6	Scotland	Edinburgh, Scotland	Murrayfield Stadium	2023 Six Nations	February 11, 2023	Loss

==== British & Irish Lions ====
Try	Opponent	Location	Venue	Competition	Date	Result
1	South Africa	Cape Town, South Africa	Cape Town Stadium	2021 British & Irish Lions tour to South Africa	August 7, 2021	Loss

== Style of play ==
Owens has been described as a "steady" line-out thrower and "very dynamic in the loose", with the ability to "pop up with spectacular tries".

== Post-rugby career ==
Owens is a pundit on the Welsh language free-to-air public broadcast television channel S4C.

== Personal life ==
Owens' sister, Vicky, is also a Wales international rugby player, having played for the Wales women's team. She earned her first cap before Owens, and the two played at Twickenham on the same day that Owens made his first start for Wales during the 2012 Six Nations.

Owens' wife Carys is a television producer who is currently the managing director of Whisper Cymru, the Welsh arm of Whisper Productions, the production company founded by Jake Humphrey and David Coulthard. She accompanied Owens on the 2017 Lions tour, along with Owens' parents, while Owens' sister and friends joined them for the test series.

In July 2019, Owens was given an honorary fellowship at the University of Wales Trinity Saint David in his home town of Carmarthen. On 5 August 2019, Owens was inducted into the Gorsedd of Bards at the National Eisteddfod of Wales in Llanrwst. He will use the bardic name "Cen y Siryf" (English: Ken the Sheriff), in reference to his nickname.
