= Jules Le Lievre =

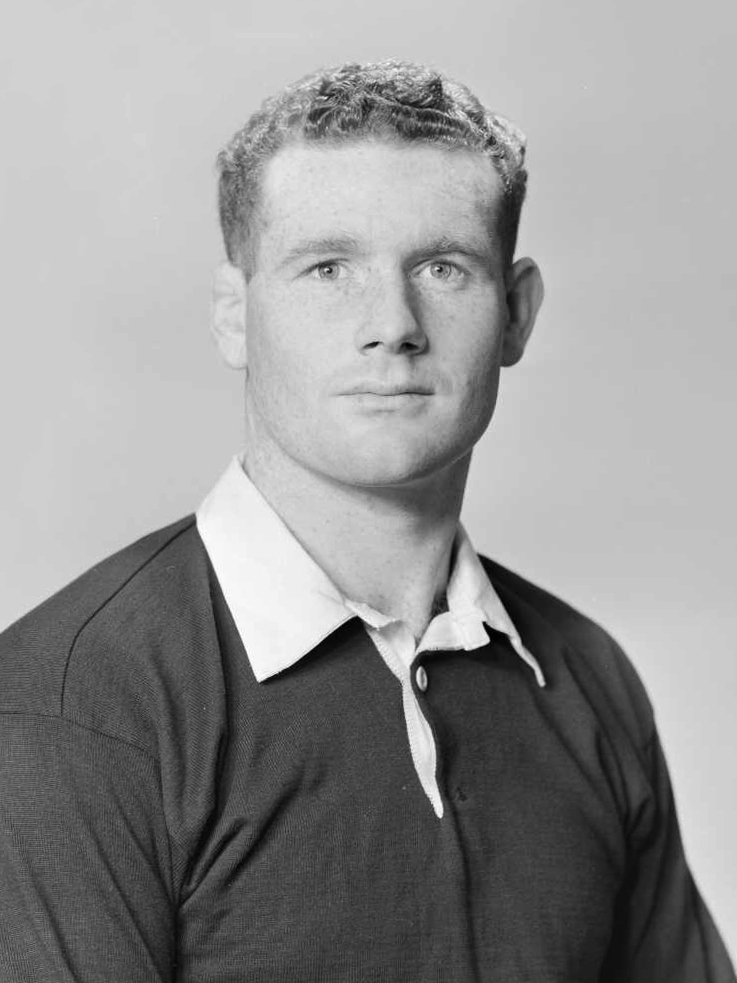
- Le Lievre c. 1960
- Born: Jules Mathew Le Lievre; 17 August 1933 Akaroa, New Zealand
- Died: 17 January 2016 (aged 82) Christchurch, New Zealand
- Height: 1.80 m (5 ft 11 in)
- Weight: 94 kg (207 lb)
- School: St Bede's College
- Notable relative: Aled de Malmanche (3rd cousin)

Rugby union career
- Position: Prop
Provincial / State sides
Years	Team	Apps	(Points)
1954–65	Canterbury	107	
International career
Years	Team	Apps	(Points)
1962–64	New Zealand	1	(0)

Jules Mathew Le Lievre (17 August 1933 – 17 January 2016) was a New Zealand rugby union player.

A prop, Le Lievre represented Canterbury at a provincial level, and was a member of the New Zealand national side, the All Blacks, from 1962 to 1964. He played 25 matches for the All Blacks but only appeared in one international. He died in Christchurch on 17 January 2016, aged 82.
