= Owen Franks =

NZ international rugby union player

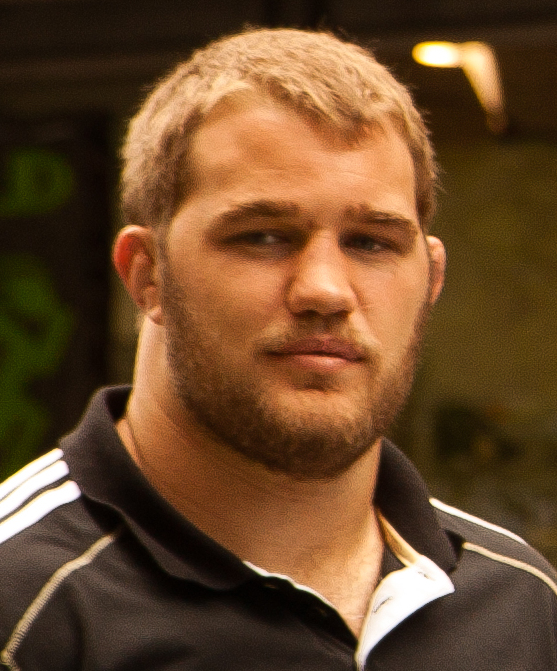
- Franks during the World Cup celebration parade, October 2011
- Full name: Owen Thomas Franks
- Born: 23 December 1987 (age 38) Motueka, New Zealand
- Height: 185 cm (6 ft 1 in)
- Weight: 122 kg (269 lb; 19 st 3 lb)
- School: Christchurch Boys' High School
- Notable relative: Ben Franks (brother)

Rugby union career
- Position: Prop
- Current team: Crusaders
Senior career
Years	Team	Apps	(Points)
2007–2019	Canterbury	26	(5)
2009–2019	Crusaders	154	(10)
2019–2021	Northampton Saints	22	(0)
2022–23	Hurricanes	12	(0)
2023	Toulouse	6	(0)
2024	Crusaders	10	(5)
- Correct as of 11 May 2023
International career
Years	Team	Apps	(Points)
2007	New Zealand U21	1	(0)
2009–2019	New Zealand	108	(0)
- Correct as of 5 June 2022

Owen Thomas Franks (born 23 December 1987) is a New Zealand former rugby player who last played for Crusaders in the Super Rugby competition. His usual position is tighthead prop.

Franks has previously represented the Canterbury Rugby Football Union in the Mitre 10 Cup, the Crusaders in the international Super Rugby competition and New Zealand at international level. He made his debut for New Zealand in 2009 and played 108 tests across a 10-year period, making him one of the most-capped rugby players of all time. He was a member of the squads that won the 2011 and 2015 Rugby World Cups, and is one of only 45 players who have won the Rugby World Cup on multiple occasions. Franks did not score any points for New Zealand during his international career. He holds the record for most international caps without scoring any points in a game.

== Career ==
=== Early career ===
Franks attended Christchurch Boys' High School. His local rugby club is Linwood. He represented New Zealand at Under-21 and Secondary School level.

While at Christchurch Boys' High School, Franks appeared alongside fellow All Blacks Colin Slade and Matt Todd, as well as former Crusaders Nasi Manu and Tim Bateman.

=== Provincial ===
Franks made his debut for Canterbury in the Air New Zealand Cup in 2007. He was also Campbell Johnstone's understudy before he left for France and Franks assumed the tighthead duties for the Canterbury team. His older brother, Ben Franks is also a prop and has played alongside Owen.

=== Super Rugby ===
Franks made his debut for the Crusaders in 2009 as a substitute against the Western Force but made his first start in the victory over the Bulls and his stellar performance also secured him an All Black contract. Relatively small in stature, he is known for his great scrummaging technique and mobility around the field. He is also very strong, with the ability to squat 280 kg.

Franks scored a try for the Crusaders against the Brumbies at Jade Stadium on Friday 14 May 2010. It was to be his last Super Rugby try until almost 14 years later when he scored against the Melbourne Rebels.

In 2015, against the Highlanders, Franks became the 13th Crusader to have played over 100 games for the Crusaders.

Franks started in the Crusaders' historic fixture against the touring British and Irish Lions team on 10 June 2017, playing 50 minutes before being replaced by Michael Alaalatoa as the Lions beat the Crusaders 12–3. Franks won the 2017 Super Rugby season later in the year, with the Crusaders beating the Lions 25–17 at Ellis Park Stadium in Johannesburg. The Crusaders' win was their eighth title and first since 2008.

=== Premiership Rugby ===
On 14 February 2019, Franks travelled to England to sign for Northampton Saints in the Premiership Rugby ahead of the 2019–20 season, where he played alongside his brother Ben Franks at Franklin's Gardens.

=== Return to Super Rugby ===
On 14 May 2021, Franks moved back to New Zealand to join Hurricanes ahead of the 2022 Super Rugby competition. Franks made his Hurricanes debut on the 8th of May 2022 in Wellington against the Fijian Drua.

Franks rejoined the Crusaders for the 2024 Super Rugby season. When Franks scored for the Crusaders against the Melbourne Rebels on Friday 26 April 2024 it was his first Super Rugby try in 14 years. His previous try in this competition was against the Brumbies in Christchurch in May 2010.

== International career ==
=== 2009 ===
His first match for New Zealand came against Italy in 2009, which the All Blacks won 27–6. Franks was chosen for the 2009 Tri-Nations tournament in New Zealand's first match against Australia. He went on to play the next two games against South Africa before playing once again against Australia. Franks played the penultimate match against South Africa but missed the final match, with Neemia Tialata playing instead. He then came on as a sub against Wales during an international test in November. A week later he started in a win over England and went on to be victorious over France a week later.

=== 2010–2011 ===
Franks became a regular starter for the All Blacks in 2010, supplanting the long-serving Neemia Tialata as New Zealand's first-choice tighthead prop. On 12 June 2010 he played against Ireland with his brother Ben also in the team. They went on to play both of the home test matches against Wales in June. He continued to play in the Tri-Nations tournament, starting the first four matches against South Africa and Australia. His brother Ben played the third test against South Africa but he missed out. However he appeared in the final Tri Nation match against Australia at Sydney winning 23–22 and in the lost Halloween test against Australia in Hong Kong. He took part in four of New Zealand's November test wins over England, Scotland, Ireland and Wales.

Franks and his older brother Ben were both selected for the 2011 Rugby World Cup. Franks started in all of the knockout rounds, playing the full 80 minutes of the World Cup final against France on 23 October 2011, with the replacement prop, his brother Ben, not making the field. New Zealand won against France 8–7, with Franks collecting his winners' medal as All Black captain Richie McCaw lifted the trophy, with New Zealand winning the competition for the second time, having won the first Rugby World Cup in 1987. According to the book, Cory Jane Winging It, Random Tales from the Right Wing, by former All Blacks teammate Cory Jane and Scott Stevenson, Franks and brother Ben are said to have celebrated the All Blacks Rugby World Cup 2011 victory by squatting the next day 280 kg for 10 Repetitions.

=== 2012–2015 ===
Franks carried a heavy workload for the All Blacks in 2012, appearing in 13 tests. Franks started 12 times in 2012 with the exception of the third Bledisloe Cup test against Australia on 20 October as he replaced newcomer Charlie Faumuina off the bench as the All Blacks drew against the Wallabies 18-18.

Franks' contribution to the All Blacks in 2013 was not as significant due to injuries, with Charlie Faumuina covering for Franks. The ten tests Franks played in 2013 saw him achieve some personal and professional milestones, playing his 50th test for New Zealand on 14 September 2013 when the All Blacks defeated the Springboks 29–15 at Eden Park. Franks' 50th test was unfortunately overshadowed by the outstanding performance of All Black captain Kieran Read and the ill-discipline of both sides, with Springbok hooker Bismarck du Plessis being red-carded in the 41st minute for elbowing All Black flanker Liam Messam's face. Franks was replaced by Faumuina in the 64th minute of the test.

Franks and his older brother Ben both came off the bench in the second half of New Zealand's final test of 2013, on 24 November that year, with Wyatt Crockett and Charlie Faumuina preferred to start against Ireland for the test. New Zealand was losing 7–22 to Ireland at halftime but Franks lead the forward pack's charge for a comeback, producing one of the best performances of his career, assisting in allowing New Zealand to equalise the score after the 80th minute. Fly-half Aaron Cruden converted Ryan Crotty's 80th minute try, allowing New Zealand to win 24–22, with Franks and his teammates becoming part of the first international rugby team to win every test they played in a calendar year.

After busy seasons in 2014 and 2015, Franks was selected for the 2015 Rugby World Cup and once again started in all three of the knockout rounds for New Zealand. Franks opened the 2015 Rugby World Cup final, against Australia on 31 October 2015, with a huge tackle on Wallabies fullback Israel Folau and played for 54 minutes before being replaced by Charlie Faumuina, who had returned from injury to take part in the tournament. New Zealand beat Australia 34-17 and became the first country to win the Rugby World Cup three times. New Zealand's victory saw Franks and his older brother Ben, who came off the bench to make his final international appearance for New Zealand that day, become the first set of siblings to win a Rugby World Cup multiple times.

=== 2016–2019 ===
Franks had a good season in 2016, starting in all 12 of his test appearances which included a historic 29–40 loss to Ireland on 5 November 2016.

Prior to being selected for New Zealand's three-test series against the British and Irish Lions and Pasifika Challenge against Samoa, Franks' achilles' tendon was observed to be in noticeable pain. Franks still managed to play in five tests for the All Blacks in 2017, including the Lions series, before being ruled out of the second Bledisloe Cup test of the year against Australia due to tearing his achilles' tendon at training. Franks was immediately replaced on the match-day sheet by former Crusaders team-mate Nepo Laulala who had not played for the All Blacks since 2015 due to his own run of injury. Laulala started in all of the remaining tests in 2017 in Franks' absence.

Franks was re-selected for New Zealand in 2018 for the three-test series against France for the June internationals, having recovered from injury during the 2018 Super Rugby season. Franks started in all three tests against France despite his lack of game-time in 2018, and performed to a reasonable level, with Ofa Tu'ungafasi replacing Franks off the bench in all three tests. The All Blacks won the series 3–0.

After finishing Super Rugby, with a title win, Franks played his 100th test for New Zealand, on 25 August 2018. Franks started for his 100th test, which was against Australia at Eden Park. Franks became the first rugby player in history to reach 100 tests without scoring any points in his career, but performed well before being replaced by Ofa Tu'ungafasi in the 52nd minute. The All Blacks won Franks' 100th test, beating Australia by 40–12, winning the Bledisloe Cup once more. Franks went on to play 6 more tests during the 2018 season, including the 9–16 loss to Ireland, with Nepo Laulala establishing himself as Franks' deputy throughout the season.

Coming off the back of an injury-plagued Super Rugby season, Franks played two tests in his final season in New Zealand, taking part in the 2019 Rugby Championship for the tenth time. After a poor performance against Australia, in a record 26–47 defeat, Franks was axed from the match-day 23 for the second Bledisloe Cup test. On 28 August 2019, Franks was dropped from the All Blacks, missing out on the 31-man squad for the 2019 Rugby World Cup, with Nepo Laulala, Atu Moli, Joe Moody, Angus Ta'avao, and Ofa Tu'ungafasi being the preferred props. Having signed for Northampton earlier in 2019, Franks’ shock omission from the squad effectively ended his decorated international career.

=== Other All Black props ===
Over the course of Owen Franks’ international career he played with and/or competed for his position with:

- Ben Franks
- Neemia Tialata
- Tony Woodcock (loosehead prop)
- John Afoa
- Wyatt Crockett (loosehead prop)
- Charlie Faumuina
- Joe Moody
- Karl Tu'inukuafe
- Ofa Tu'ungafasi
- Tim Perry
