= Harry Robinson (rugby union) =

Welsh rugby player (born 1993)

- Born: Harry Rhys Robinson; 16 April 1993 (age 33) Pentyrch, Wales
- Height: 179 cm (5 ft 10 in)
- Weight: 91 kg (14 st 5 lb; 201 lb)
- School: Radyr Comprehensive School

Rugby union career
- Position: Wing
Senior career
Years	Team	Apps	(Points)
2010–2014	Cardiff Blues	50	(25)
2011–2012	Cardiff	17	(40)
2014–2016	Scarlets	30	(45)
2015–2016	Llanelli	5	(5)
2015	Carmarthen Quins	2	(0)
International career
Years	Team	Apps	(Points)
2012–2013	Wales	3	(10)
National sevens team
Years	Team		Comps
2011–2012	Wales		

Harry Rhys Robinson (born 16 April 1993) is a Welsh former rugby union player who played as a wing. At club level, he played for Cardiff Blues and the Scarlets, and won 3 caps at international level for Wales between 2012 and 2013.

== Career ==
Robinson started playing rugby at Pentyrch RFC, and made his professional debut for the Cardiff Blues in January 2011 at the age of 17. He spent much of the next season playing for Wales in the Sevens World Series, but caught the eye in the shorter form of the game was called up to the senior 15s squad in January 2012 before Six Nations despite having made just four senior appearances for the Blues. He then went on to make his debut that June against the Barbarians where he scored a try.

He became a regular starter for the Blues during the 2012–13 season and won two further caps on the tour of Japan in June 2013. However, the following season, he only scored one try and dropped out of the international frame, and subsequently moved to the Scarlets.

In March 2015, while playing against Edinburgh, he suffered a severe neck injury that required surgery. Despite making a brief comeback later in the year, the injury ultimately forced him to retire aged 23 on medical advice in April 2016.
