= Lou Reed (rugby union) =

Wales international rugby player

- Born: 10 September 1987 (age 39) Treorchy, Rhondda Cynon Taf, Wales
- Height: 6 ft 8 in (2.03 m)
- Weight: 18 st 13 lb (120 kg)

Rugby union career
- Position: Lock
Senior career
Years	Team	Apps	(Points)
2007–2008	Rotherham		
2006–2012	Scarlets	109	(5)
2012–2016	Cardiff Blues	40	(5)
2016–2017	Sale Sharks	2	(0)
International career
Years	Team	Apps	(Points)
2012–2013	Wales	5	(0)

Lou Reed (born 10 September 1987) is a Welsh international rugby union footballer. He previously played as a lock for Sale Sharks in the Premiership league. Reed is currently working as a representative for Heraeus Medical in South Wales, although occasionally still plays rugby in his free time.

Reed signed for the Scarlets on a professional development contract in March 2006, but only made five appearances in the 2006–07 season. In order to gain some experience of first-team rugby, Reed was loaned to Rotherham for a month in December 2007.

In May 2012 the press announced that Reed would join Cardiff Blues, and the move was confirmed on 8 June.

== International ==
In June 2011 he was named in the Wales national rugby union team 45 man training squad for the 2011 Rugby World Cup. Reed made his full international debut for Wales versus Scotland on 12 February 2012 as a second-half replacement.
