= Jonathan Spratt =

Wales international rugby union footballer

- Born: Jonathan Spratt; 28 April 1986 (age 40) Neath, Wales
- Height: 188 cm (6 ft 2 in)
- Weight: 100 kg (15 st 10 lb; 220 lb)
- School: Dwr-y-Felin Comprehensive School
- University: Swansea University

Rugby union career
- Position: Centre
- Current team: Ospreys
Amateur team(s)
Years	Team	Apps	(Points)
–2005	Neath Athletic		
2005–2010	Neath		
2009	→ Bridgend (loan)		
Senior career
Years	Team	Apps	(Points)
2006–2011	Ospreys	23	(10)
2008	→ Taranaki (loan)	6	(15)
2011–2012	London Irish	11	(5)
2012–2017	Ospreys	78	(40)
International career
Years	Team	Apps	(Points)
2009–2013	Wales	4	(0)

Jonathan Spratt (born 28 April 1986) is a former Welsh international rugby union player. A centre, he made his debut for the Wales national rugby union team on 30 May 2009 as a second-half substitute in a match versus Canada.

Spratt is a former playing member of The Legion rugby sevens team and is an honorary Legionnaire – an honour also held by his older brother Andrew.

In 2008, Spratt signed with Taranaki to play in the Air New Zealand Cup.

In May 2011 Spratt joined London Irish from the Ospreys. and in July 2012 he rejoined the Ospreys
