= Ashley Beck =

Wales international rugby union footballer

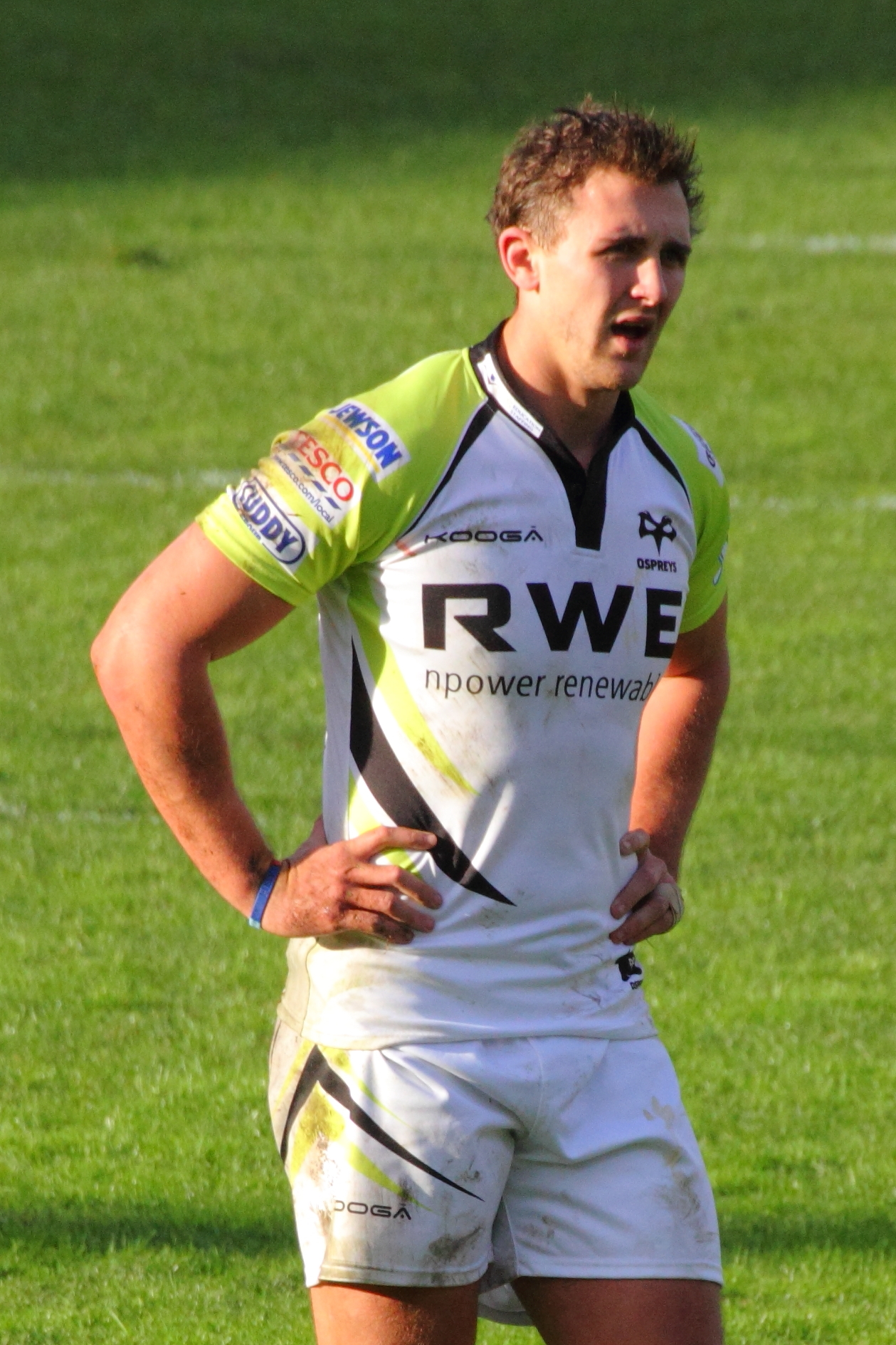
- Born: Ashley Beck; 15 April 1990 (age 36) Neath, Wales
- Height: 191 cm (6 ft 3 in)
- Weight: 103 kg (16 st 3 lb; 227 lb)
- School: Dwr-y-Felin Comprehensive School
- University: Neath College

Rugby union career
- Position: Centre
Senior career
Years	Team	Apps	(Points)
2007–2018	Ospreys	104	(105)
2018–2022	Worcester Warriors	60	(40)
2022–	Merthyr RFC	0	(0)
- Correct as of 18 March 2023
International career
Years	Team	Apps	(Points)
2012–2013	Wales	7	(10)
- Correct as of 18 March 2023
Coaching career
- Years: Team
- 2023–: Worcester Warriors Women (attack coach)

Ashley Beck is a Wales international rugby union player. Beck currently played for Merthyr RFC, and has previously played for Worcester Warriors and the Ospreys. He has represented Wales and Wales U20. He is the current attack coach of Premiership Women's Rugby side Worcester Warriors Women.

== Club career ==
Beck progressed through the Ospreys academy teams, making his debut for Aberavon RFC in the Welsh Premiership at age 17 in October 2007, scoring a try on that debut. He played 63 times for Aberavon before establishing himself in the Ospreys senior squad.

In early 2014, Beck signed a two-year extension to his Ospreys contract. Beck suffered an ACL rupture in the opening round of the 2015–16 Pro12, forcing him to miss most of the season. Beck extended his contract again in 2016, taking him to the end of the 2017–18 season. A pre-season shoulder injury forced Beck into a significant layoff in 2017.

On 13 February 2018, Beck departed the Ospreys to join English club Worcester Warriors in the Aviva Premiership ahead of the 2018–19 season. Beck broke his leg in October 2018, and missed the remainder of the season. He extended his contract with Worcester in early 2022.

On 5 October 2022 all Worcester players had their contacts terminated due to the liquidation of the company to which they were contracted.

Beck signed with Merthyr RFC following his departure from Worcester.

Ahead of the 2022–23 Champions Cup, Beck was registered with Cardiff Rugby.

== International career ==
In 2009 and 2010, Beck represented Wales U20 at the IRB Under 20 Championship as well as featuring in the 2009 Six Nations Under 20s Championship.

In January 2012 Beck was called into the Wales 35 man senior squad for the training camp in Poland prior to the 2012 Six Nations Championship. He made his international debut on 9 June 2012 versus Australia in Brisbane as a second-half replacement. Beck started against Samoa in the 2012 end-of-year rugby union internationals and scored his first try for Wales.

An ankle injury ruled Beck out of the subsequent 2013 Six Nations. Another injury forced Beck to miss the 2013 Wales rugby union tour of Japan. Beck was selected for the Wales squad for the 2013 end-of-year rugby union internationals, coming off the bench against South Africa and Argentina, while starting against Tonga and scoring his second test try. The match against Tonga was to be Beck's last Welsh cap.

Beck did not participate in the 2014 Six Nations, with a persistent hip injury affecting his training, forcing him to rule himself out the tournament. The injury kept Beck out of the contention for the 2014 Wales rugby union tour of South Africa and 2014 end-of-year rugby union internationals.

=== International tries ===
Try	Opponent	Location	Venue	Competition	Date	Result
1	Samoa	Cardiff, Wales	Millennium Stadium	2012 Autumn Internationals	16 November 2012	Loss
2	Tonga	Cardiff, Wales	Millennium Stadium	2013 Autumn Internationals	22 November 2013	Win

== Coaching career ==
In July 2023, Beck was announced as the attack coach of Premiership Women's Rugby side Worcester Warriors Women.
