= Rob Howley =

Former Welsh rugby union player/current coach

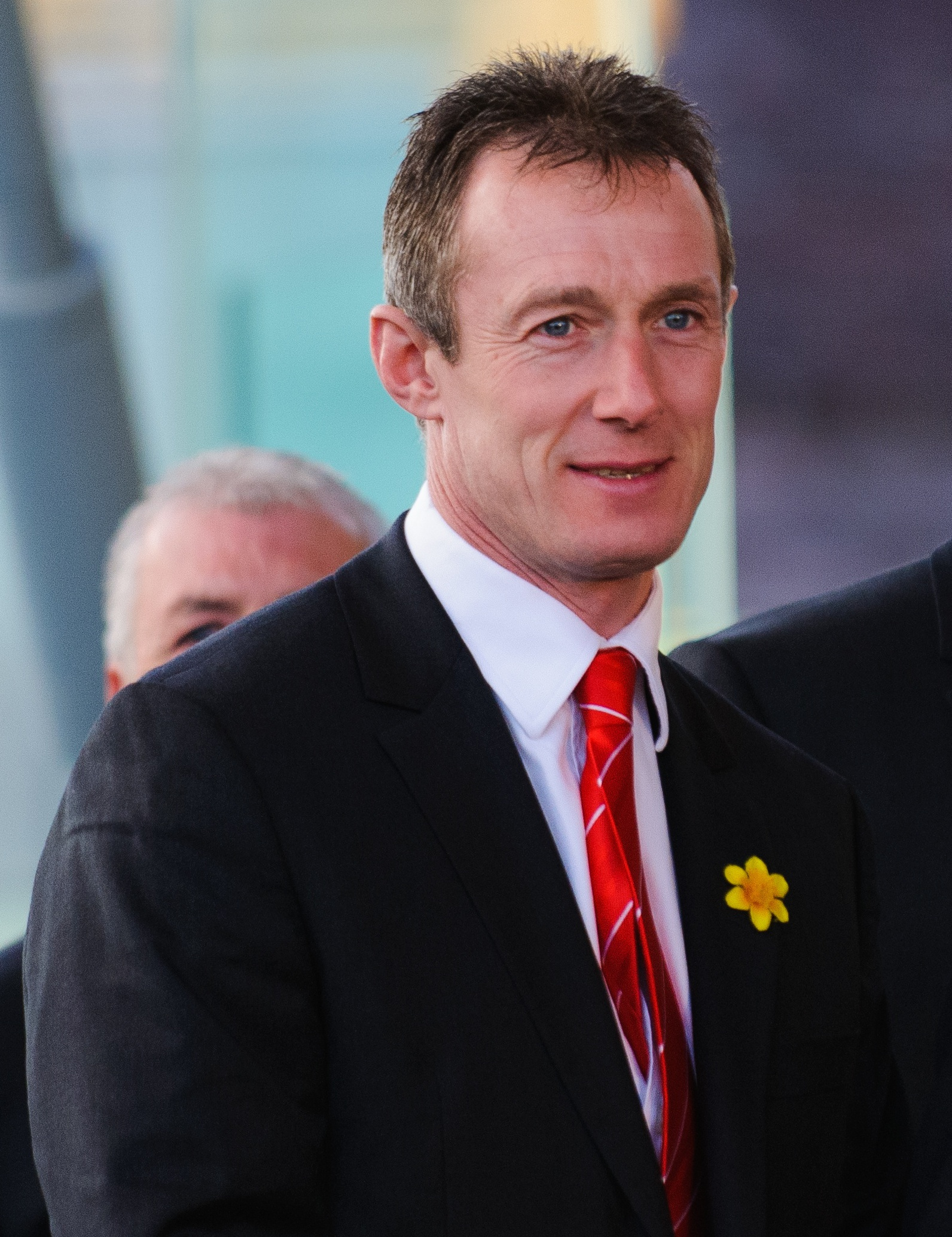
- Howley at the Wales Grand Slam Celebration on March 19, 2012
- Born: Robert Howley; 13 October 1970 (age 56) Bridgend, Wales
- Height: 1.76 m (5 ft 9 in)
- Weight: 83 kg (13 st 1 lb; 183 lb)
- School: Brynteg Comprehensive School
- University: University College of Swansea

Rugby union career
- Position: Scrum-half
Senior career
Years	Team	Apps	(Points)
1990–1993	Bridgend	40	(72)
1993	Cardiff	6	(0)
1994–1996	Bridgend	46	(42)
1996–2002	Cardiff	120	(210)
2002–2004	Wasps	59	(45)
International career
Years	Team	Apps	(Points)
1996-2002	Wales	59	(50)
1997, 2001	British & Irish Lions	2	(0)
Coaching career
- Years: Team
- 2004: Barbarians (assistant)
- 2005–2008: Cardiff Blues (assistant)
- 2008–19: Wales (assistant)
- 2009, 2013, 2017: British & Irish Lions (assistant)
- 2012–13: Wales (caretaker)
- 2016–17: Wales (caretaker)

Robert Howley (born 13 October 1970) is a Welsh rugby union coach and former player. As a player, he won 59 caps for Wales, 22 of them as captain. He was part of the Wales coaching staff from 2008 to 2019.

He is currently a coaching consultant for the Toronto Arrows in Major League Rugby (MLR).

== Playing career ==
=== Club ===
Howley played for Bridgend, Cardiff and Wasps. He gained the distinction of Welsh Player of the Year in 1996 and 1997.

He helped Wasps win back-to-back Premiership titles in 2003 and 2004. He also helped Wasps win the Heineken Cup in 2004; his late try in the final won them the game against Toulouse. A wrist injury saw Howley announce his retirement from the game in 2004.

=== International ===
Howley represented Wales at Schools, Students, U21, A and B levels.

He made his senior Wales debut in February 1996. He was selected for the 1997 British Lions tour to South Africa, prompting speculation of a match-up with the Springboks' Joost van der Westhuizen, but Howley suffered a tour-ending shoulder injury in a match against Natal prior to the start of the test series. Howley made the 2001 British & Irish Lions tour to Australia and played in the first two tests before succumbing to injury.

He retired from international rugby when he joined Wasps.

== Coaching career ==
Following his retirement from playing, Howley coached Cardiff RFC.

In 2008, he was named as the attack coach as part of Warren Gatland's Wales coaching staff. Over the next 12 years, the national side won four Six Nations titles, including three Grand Slams, and reached the Rugby World Cup semi-finals in 2011 and the quarter-finals in 2015.

He was attack coach during 2009 British & Irish Lions tour to South Africa under head coach Ian McGeechan, and retained the role under Warren Gatland in the 2013 British & Irish Lions tour to Australia, helping the Lions secure their first series win since 1997.

=== Wales caretaker coach ===
==== 2012–2013 ====
In April 2012, Howley temporarily covered the day-to-day running of the coaching team, after Warren Gatland suffered two broken heels while on holiday in New Zealand. Warren Gatland was unable to lead Wales on their 2012 tour to Australia because of his injury, and Rob Howley took charge as caretaker coach during the tour. Rob Howley continued his caretaker role in the 2012 Autumn Internationals as Gatland was selected as head coach of the 2013 British & Irish Lions tour to Australia. However, Howley would only coach Wales in the opening 2 matches; Argentina and Samoa, and that Gatland would return to coach the side against New Zealand and Australia in week 3 and 4. Due to Gatland's role as head coach of the Lions, he was unable to coach Wales in the 2013 Six Nations, therefore Howley continued his role through the 2013 tournament.

As Wales coach, Howley faced much criticism. Wales beat the Barbarians 30–21 in his opening match as caretaker, but after that, Wales suffered eight consecutive defeats, six of which were under Howley. This included a 3–0 series defeat against Australia during their 2012 tour, a series whitewash in the 2012 Autumn internationals and a loss in the opening round of the 2013 Six Nations against Ireland. The last five defeats were all at home, setting a new Wales record for consecutive home defeats. The streak was broken in round 2 of the Six Nations with a 16–6 win over France. Howley led Wales to a Championship win in the 2013 Six Nations after beating England by a record winning margin, 30–3 at the Millennium Stadium. This was Wales' fourth Championship win since it became the Six Nations in 2000, and the first time Wales won back-to-back championships since 1979.

==== 2016–2017 ====
On 7 September 2016, Howley was once again given the head coaching duties for the Welsh national side after Gatland retained his head coaching role of the British & Irish Lions for their 2017 tour to New Zealand. Howley took charge of Wales effective immediately, coaching Wales in all 2016 Autumn internationals, which saw Wales win 3 from 4. He also coached the side during the 2017 Six Nations Championship, and assisted the British & Irish Lions during their 2017 Summer tour.

=== 2019 suspension ===
On 17 September 2019 Rob Howley was sent home from Wales' Rugby World Cup training camp in Japan for a breach of sports betting rules. He was later banned for 18 months with nine suspended after being found guilty of placing 363 bets on rugby union, covering 1,163 matches in total. Howley linked his betting to his sister's depression, alcoholism and early death.

=== Results ===
Date	Venue	Home	Score	Away	Notes
2012
2 June	Millennium Stadium, Cardiff	Wales	30–21	Barbarians	
9 June	Suncorp Stadium, Brisbane	Australia	27–19	Wales	2012 Welsh tour to Australia
16 June	Etihad Stadium, Melbourne	Australia	25–23	Wales	2012 Welsh tour to Australia
23 June	Sydney Football Stadium, Sydney	Australia	20–19	Wales	2012 Welsh tour to Australia
10 November	Millennium Stadium, Cardiff	Wales	12–26	Argentina	2012 end-of-year rugby union tests
16 November	Millennium Stadium, Cardiff	Wales	19–26	Samoa	2012 end-of-year rugby union tests
2013
2 February	Millennium Stadium, Cardiff	Wales	22–30	Ireland	2013 Six Nations
9 February	Stade de France, Saint-Denis	France	6–16	Wales	2013 Six Nations
23 February	Stadio Olimpico, Rome	Italy	9–26	Wales	2013 Six Nations
9 March	Murrayfield Stadium, Edinburgh	Scotland	18–28	Wales	2013 Six Nations
16 March	Millennium Stadium, Cardiff	Wales	30–3	England	2013 Six Nations
2016
5 November	Principality Stadium, Cardiff	Wales	8–32	Australia	2016 end-of-year rugby union internationals
12 November	Principality Stadium, Cardiff	Wales	24–20	Argentina	2016 end-of-year rugby union internationals
19 November	Principality Stadium, Cardiff	Wales	33–30	Japan	2016 end-of-year rugby union internationals
26 November	Principality Stadium, Cardiff	Wales	27–13	South Africa	2016 end-of-year rugby union internationals
2017
5 February	Stadio Olimpico, Rome	Italy	7–33	Wales	2017 Six Nations
11 February	Principality Stadium, Cardiff	Wales	16-21	England	2017 Six Nations
25 February	Murrayfield Stadium, Edinburgh	Scotland	29-13	Wales	2017 Six Nations
10 March	Principality Stadium, Cardiff	Wales	22-9	Ireland	2017 Six Nations
18 March	Stade de France, Saint-Denis	France	20–18	Wales	2017 Six Nations
