= Owen Williams (rugby union, born 1991) =

- Born: Owen Williams; 2 October 1991 (age 35) Merthyr Tydfil, Wales
- Height: 191 cm (6 ft 3 in)
- Weight: 96 kg (15 st 2 lb)

Rugby union career
- Position: Centre
- Current team: Cardiff Blues
Senior career
Years	Team	Apps	(Points)
2009-2012	Cardiff RFC	31	(70)
2010-	Cardiff Blues	34	(10)
International career
Years	Team	Apps	(Points)
2010-2011	Wales U20	12	(20)
2011-2013	Wales Sevens		
2013	Wales	4	(5)

Owen Williams (born 2 October 1991) is a former Welsh rugby union player. A centre, he played club rugby for Cardiff Blues regional team.

Having previously been selected for the Wales national rugby sevens team, in May 2013 Williams was selected in the Wales national rugby union team 32-man training squad for the summer 2013 tour to Japan. He made his international debut against Japan on 8 June 2013 and maintained his place in the squad for Wales' Autumn internationals for 2013.

While playing for the Cardiff Blues in the 2014 World Club Tens, he suffered a significant injury to his spine and has been recovering in a hospital since. The injury left him paralysed from the chest down and needing to use a wheelchair.
