= Andries Pretorius (rugby union) =

South African-Welsh rugby union footballer

- Born: Andries Pretorius; 26 September 1985 (age 41) Nelspruit, South Africa
- Height: 1.93 m (6 ft 4 in)
- Weight: 110 kg (243 lb)
- University: Hartpury College

Rugby union career
- Position: Back row
- Current team: Cardiff Blues
Amateur team(s)
Years	Team	Apps	(Points)
2006–2009	Gloucester Academy		
Senior career
Years	Team	Apps	(Points)
2009–2014	Cardiff Blues	59	(15)
2014–2015	Worcester Warriors	0	(0)
- Correct as of 2 Jan 2015
International career
Years	Team	Apps	(Points)
- England Students;
2013	Wales	2	(0)
- Correct as of 2 Jan 2015

Andries Pretorius (born 26 September 1985) is a former Wales international rugby union player who played for Cardiff Blues in the Pro12 league and Worcester Warriors in the RFU Championship. He played at number 8, but also played at blindside flanker and at lock. He left Cardiff Blues to sign for Worcester Warriors in the RFU Championship from the 2014–15 season. He never made his competitive debut for Worcester due to suffering a calf injury in pre-season. On 30 January 2015 it was announced he was to retire from rugby with immediate effect on medical grounds.

== International career ==
Pretorius was born in South Africa and he became eligible to play for Wales through residency on 1 December 2012, and expressed his hope to do so. In January 2013 he was selected in the 35 man Wales squad for the 2013 Six Nations championship.

In May 2013 he was selected in the Wales national rugby union team 32-man training squad for the 2013 summer tour to Japan. He made his international debut against Japan on 8 June 2013.
