= Ben Franks =

New Zealand rugby union footballer

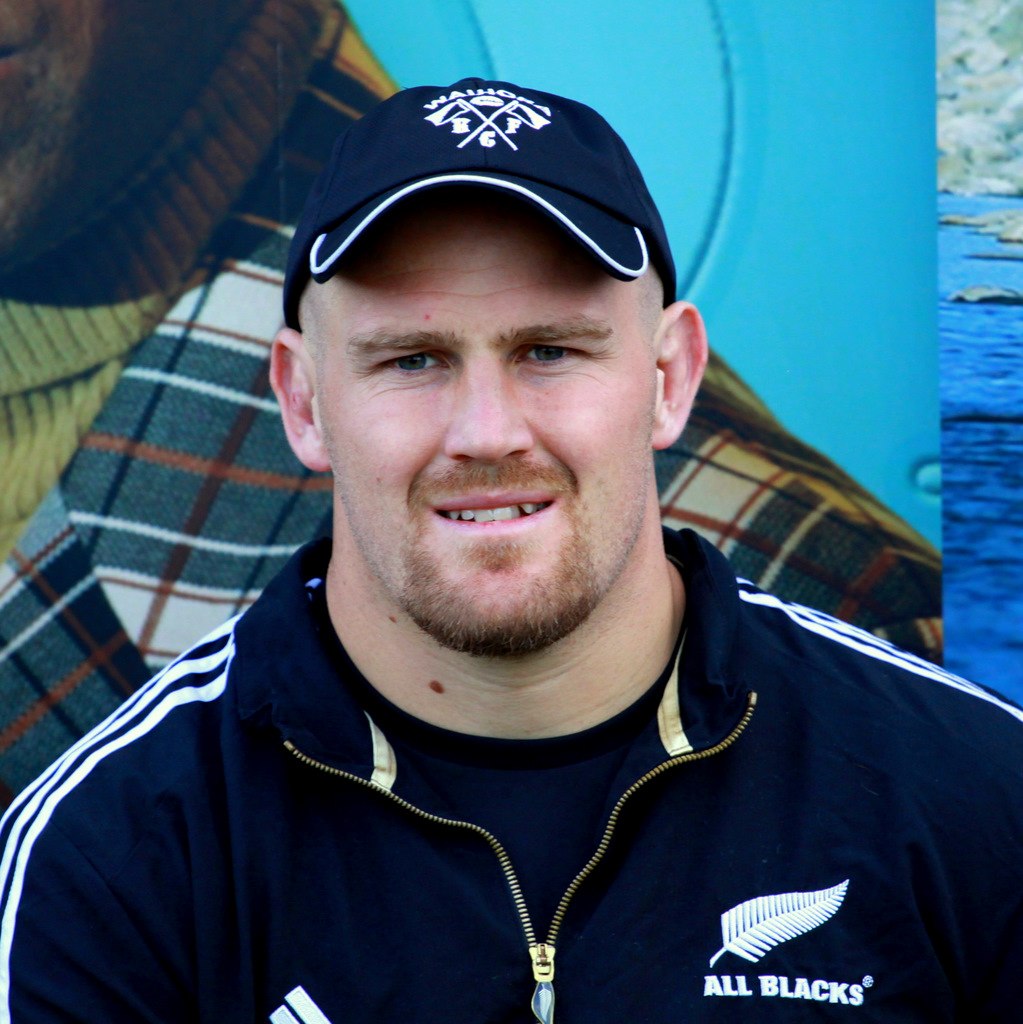
- Born: Ben John Franks; 27 March 1984 (age 42) Melbourne, Victoria, Australia
- Height: 1.85 m (6 ft 1 in)
- Weight: 120 kg (18 st 13 lb; 265 lb)
- School: Christchurch Boys' High School; Aranui High School
- Notable relative: Owen Franks (brother)
- Occupation: Scrum Coach

Rugby union career
- Position: Tighthead Prop
Amateur team(s)
Years	Team	Apps	(Points)
- Linwood RFC
Senior career
Years	Team	Apps	(Points)
2015–2018	London Irish	54	(35)
2018-2020	Northampton Saints	41	(5)
Provincial / State sides
Years	Team	Apps	(Points)
2005–2006, 2012	Canterbury	8	(0)
2007–2011	Tasman	22	(0)
2013–2015	Hawke's Bay	3	(0)
- Correct as of 6 August 2021
Super Rugby
Years	Team	Apps	(Points)
2006–2012	Crusaders	85	(10)
2013–2015	Hurricanes	45	(20)
- Correct as of 6 August 2021
International career
Years	Team	Apps	(Points)
2008–2015	New Zealand	47	(10)
- Correct as of 6 August 2021
Coaching career
- Years: Team
- 2020–: Scarlets (scrum coach)

Ben John Franks (born 27 March 1984) is an Australian-born New Zealand rugby union coach and former player. He played as a prop. He is one of only 45 players who have won the Rugby World Cup on multiple occasions.

Ben Franks along with younger brother Owen run their own gym in Christchurch, New Zealand called "Franks Brothers Gym". Franks is extremely strong, with video footage showing him squatting 300 kg.

== Club career ==
=== Provincial ===
Franks made his provincial debut for Canterbury against Otago in 2005. He has since played for both Canterbury and the Tasman Mako in the Air New Zealand Cup, securing 42 caps (16 for Canterbury, 26 for Tasman).

=== Super Rugby ===
He played for the Crusaders between 2006 and 2012 in the elite Super Rugby competition, making his debut against the Chiefs in 2006. He joined the Hurricanes for the 2013 Super Rugby season.

Ben is the older brother of Owen also an All Black prop, and both represent the Linwood Rugby club in Christchurch. Both brothers were selected for the 2010 All Blacks squad to face Ireland and Wales in the home series thus being the first brothers to represent New Zealand since Robin and Zinzan Brooke.

=== Premiership Rugby ===
On 20 January 2015, it was confirmed Franks would join Premiership Rugby side London Irish after the 2015 Rugby World Cup. After three seasons with London Irish, it was confirmed that Franks would link up with Northampton Saints for the 2018/19 season. He retired from playing in 2020, turning to coaching instead.

== International career ==
On 26 October 2008, Franks was selected for the All Blacks end of year tour squad to travel to Hong Kong, England, Ireland, Scotland and Wales. He became Aranui High School's first ever All Black when he played against Munster at Thomond Park.

He started the first match of the Pacific Nations Cup against Samoa in June 2009 with a close victory, winning 17–16. He then played the final match of the tournament against Tonga, but did not score a point even though New Zealand won 47–25.

Franks played his first match of 2010 in a test match at Yarrow Stadium against Ireland. The All Black's won by a triumphant 66–28 and Franks got his first ever try for the All Blacks. He also played a week later in the All Black's victory over Wales in Dunedin.

His test performance won him a spot in the All Blacks line up to face South Africa in the first match of the 2010 Tri-Nations tournament. He played again against South Africa a week later and twice against Australia in the following weeks. He played the penultimate match against South Africa but was left out of the team for the final match against Australia and his place taken by his brother Owen.

He started off 2011 with a friendly against Fiji followed by wins over South Africa and Australia in the 2011 Tri-Nations tournament. He played in the penultimate loss to South Africa and was subsequently replaced by brother Owen once again.

Franks came on as a sub during the opening match of the 2011 Rugby World Cup. He was an unused replacement as New Zealand beat France in the final

Franks was later named in the 31-man All Black squad to attend the 2015 Rugby World Cup, playing in the knockout stages including the final where New Zealand defeated Australia 34–17.

== Coaching career ==
Following his 2020 retirement, Franks was appointed scrum coach at URC side Scarlets.
