= Rhys Gill =

Wales international rugby union footballer

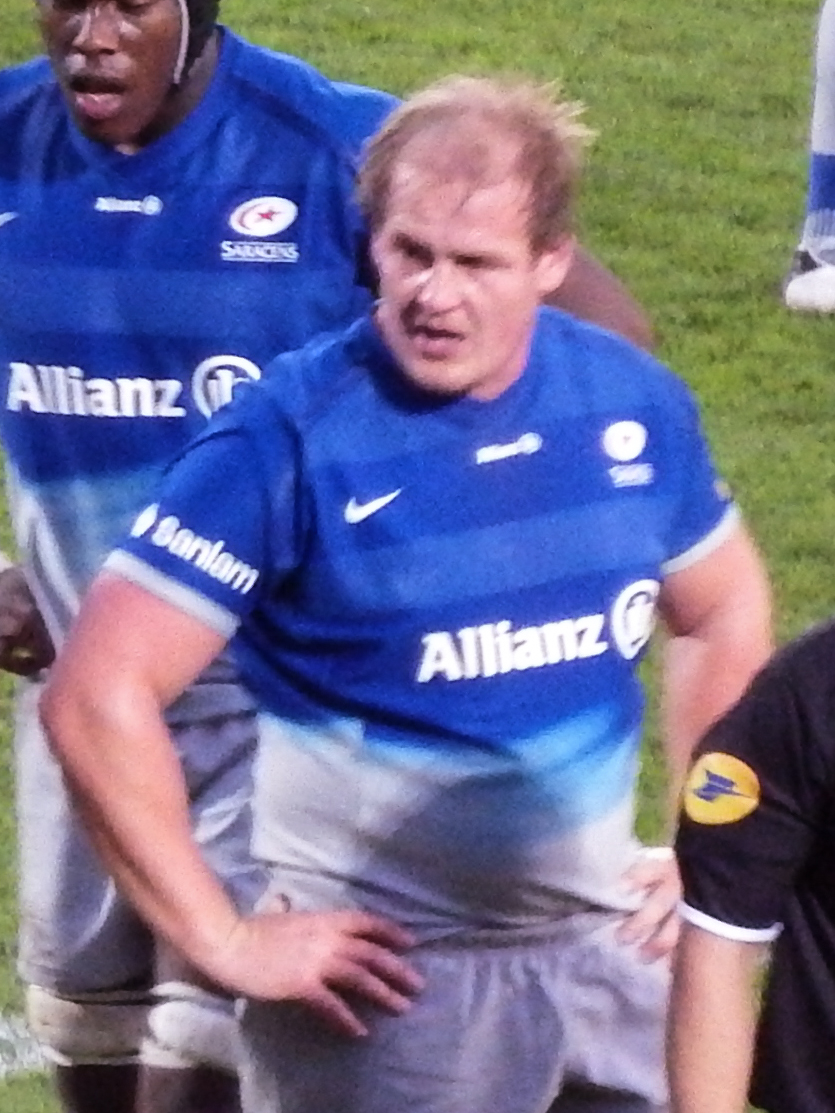
- Born: Iorworth Alan Rhys Gill; 30 October 1986 (age 40) Rhondda, Wales
- Height: 183 cm (6 ft 0 in)
- Weight: 116 kg (18 st 4 lb; 256 lb)
- School: Ysgol Gyfun Cymer Rhondda
- University: Pencoed College

Rugby union career
- Position: Loosehead Prop
Senior career
| Years | Team | Apps | (Points) |
| 2005–2008 | Cardiff RFC | 54 | (25) |
| 2008–2009 | Glamorgan | 11 | (0) |
| 2009–2016 | Saracens | 135 | (20) |
| 2016-2022 | Cardiff Blues | 67 | (5) |
- Correct as of 11 December 2019
Provincial / State sides
| Years | Team | Apps | (Points) |
| 2005–2009 | Cardiff Blues | 5 | (0) |
International career
| Years | Team | Apps | (Points) |
| 2010–2016 | Wales | 7 | (0) |
- Correct as of 19 November 2016

Iorworth Alan Rhys Gill (born 30 October 1986) is a Wales international rugby union player. A prop forward he joined Saracens in May 2009 having previously played for Cardiff Blues.

A former member of the Cardiff Blues Academy, Gill represented Wales at Under-16 and Under-18 levels before signing with Cardiff RFC as an 18-year-old. He made his Cardiff debut in 2005 and went on to become a member of the Wales Under-21 squad that season. He finished his first season for the club with 18 appearances and made his Magners League bow with the Cardiff Blues as a substitute against Munster at Thomond Park in May 2006. The loose-head was signed by English Premiership side Saracens in 2009, having been scouted by the club's assistant coach Cobus Visagie as a powerful set-piece performer.

On 18 January 2010 Gill was named in the 35 man Wales national Squad for the 2010 Six Nations tournament. Gill made his debut for the Wales national rugby union team against Ireland on 13 March 2010 as a second-half replacement.

After helping Saracens to a maiden Premiership title in 2011, playing as a replacement in the final, Gill was handed another chance in a Wales jersey – against Ireland in the opening game of the 2012 Six Nations.
