= Aled de Malmanche =

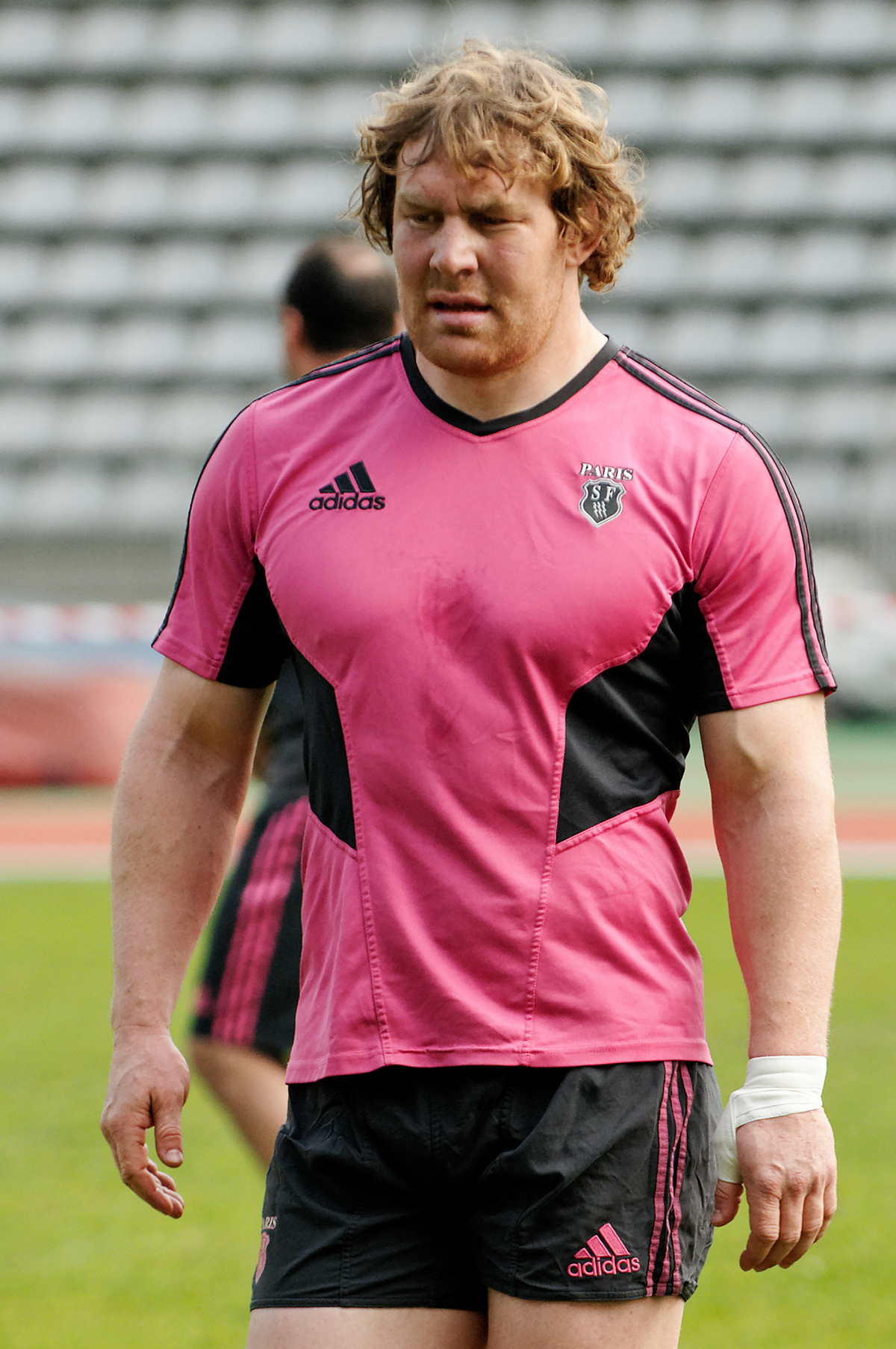
- During a training session of Stade Français, March 2012
- Born: 11 September 1984 (age 42) Palmerston North, New Zealand
- Height: 1.85 m (6 ft 1 in)
- Weight: 113 kg (17 st 11 lb)
- School: Hamilton Boys' High School
- University: Waikato Institute of Technology
- Occupation: Professional Rugby Player

Rugby union career
- Position(s): Hooker, Prop
Senior career
Years	Team	Apps	(Points)
2011-2017	Stade Français	70	(15)
- Correct as of 31 January 2015
Provincial / State sides
Years	Team	Apps	(Points)
2005-2011	Waikato	57	(15)
- Correct as of waikato rugby union
Super Rugby
Years	Team	Apps	(Points)
2007-2011	Chiefs	62	(10)
International career
Years	Team	Apps	(Points)
2009	New Zealand	5	(0)
- Correct as of 26 June 2010

Aled Peter de Malmanche (born 11 September 1984 in Palmerston North, New Zealand) is a former New Zealand rugby union footballer. He most recently played at hooker for Stade Français in the Top 14. He signed in 2011 from the Chiefs in Super Rugby and Waikato in the Air New Zealand Cup. He has also played for New Zealand. He also played as a prop on both sides of the scrum. He was also qualified to play for Wales through his Welsh grandparents, but became ineligible after his All Blacks debut. However, with IOC rules taking precedence for rugby following its inclusion in the 2016 olympics, de Malmanche was eligible for Wales selection for the 2015 rugby world cup, however did not feature.

De Malmanche was educated at Hamilton Boys' High School and also attended Waikato Institute of Technology. He played club rugby for Hamilton Old Boys. He progressed through age-grade ranks and impressed at provincial rugby level in 2006 for Waikato, winners of the inaugural 2006 Air New Zealand Cup. He made his debut for Waikato in 2005 against North Harbour in Hamilton. He played over 35 games for them and scored three tries. His first Super 14 game was against the Brumbies in the 2007 Super 14 season. He was soon selected into the New Zealand Mǎori team, playing for them in the 2007 Churchill Cup against Canada. His first game for the All Blacks was against Italy in the 2009 mid-year rugby test series.

Aled de Malmanche is a distant 'cousin' of another former All Black, Jules Le Lievre. (In genealogy terminology they 3rd cousins, twice removed). Aled & Jules are also descendants of the first French settlers to arrive at Akaroa, a town on the east coast of the South Island and 81 kilometres from Christchurch, in 1840, aboard the vessel, Comte de Paris.

They trace their common ancestry to Emeri de Malmanche and his wife Rose Victoire Jerzeau, who arrived in New Zealand with their then surviving family, a daughter (Justine Rose) and a son (Pierre).

Aled is descended from Emeri's & Rose's son, Pierre de Malmanche and his wife, Elizabeth Marguerite Margaret Hamilton.

Also aboard the Comte de Paris was an Etienne Francois Le Lievre who subsequently married Emeri's & Rose's daughter, Justine Rose de Malmanche, from whom Jules Le Lievre is descended.

Since retiring from Rugby, de Malmanche works for the Waikato Regional Council.
