= Adam Warren (rugby union) =

Welsh rugby union footballer

- Born: 7 March 1991 (age 35) Burry Port, Wales
- Height: 181 cm (5 ft 11 in)
- Weight: 86 kg (13 st 8 lb)
- Notable relative: Aaron Warren (brother)

Rugby union career
- Position: Outside Centre
Senior career
| Years | Team | Apps | (Points) |
| 2010, 2013-14 | Llanelli | 4 | (10) |
| 2010-15 | Llandovery | 53 | (105) |
Provincial / State sides
| Years | Team | Apps | (Points) |
| 2011-15 | Scarlets | 67 | (35) |
| 2015-2022 | Dragons | 73 | (35) |
International career
| Years | Team | Apps | (Points) |
| 2012-2015 | Wales | 1 | (0) |

Adam Warren (born 7 March 1991) is a Wales international rugby union player currently playing for the Dragons. His position is at centre.

Warren came through the youth ranks at Llangennech. After a storming debut season in the First XV he won the 2009-2010 player of the season award and earned himself a move to Llandovery for the 2010-2011 season and he progressed to the Scarlets regional team. In June 2015 he joined the Dragons.

== International ==
Warren has represented the Wales national rugby sevens team and Wales national under-20 rugby union team. He made his debut for Wales against the Barbarians on 2 June 2012 at the Millennium Stadium as a second-half replacement.

In May 2013 he was selected in the Wales national rugby union team for the summer 2013 tour to Japan.
