= Emyr Phillips =

Wales international rugby union footballer

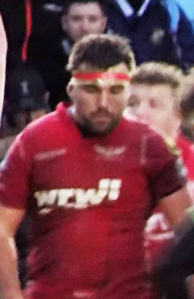
- Born: Emyr Phillips; 22 February 1987 (age 39) Llandovery, Wales
- Height: 1.83 m (6 ft 0 in)
- Weight: 102 kg (16 st 1 lb; 225 lb)
- School: Llandovery College and Pantycelyn, Llandovery
- University: UWIC Cardiff

Rugby union career
- Position: Hooker
Senior career
Years	Team	Apps	(Points)
2005–2015	Llandovery RFC	127	(75)
- Correct as of 23 September 2016
Provincial / State sides
Years	Team	Apps	(Points)
2009–2018	Scarlets	126	(15)
- Correct as of 23 September 2016
International career
Years	Team	Apps	(Points)
2013–2018	Wales	3	(0)
- Correct as of 11 December 2015

Emyr Phillips (born 22 February 1987) is a retired former Welsh international rugby union player. He played most of his career as Hooker for the Scarlets having previously played for Llandovery RFC and Llanelli RFC.

In March 2012 Phillips was part of a Scarlets Rugby side that reached the semi-final of the 2012 Anglo Welsh Cup. He made three starts and four appearances in the tournament. Scarlets were beaten in the semi-final by English side Northampton Saints. However reaching that stage was the second best finish in the Anglo-Welsh Cup on record, for the Welsh side. Their final loss to Wasps in 2006 the only better result.

Phillips has scored 21 tries in 282 appearances for Llandovery and the Scarlets. He won the first of three international caps for Wales against Japan in 2013.

He retired at the conclusion of the 2017–18 Pro14 Rugby Union season.
