= Bradley Davies =

Wales international rugby union player

- Born: Bradley Scott Davies; 9 January 1987 (age 39) Llantrisant, Wales
- Height: 1.98 m (6 ft 6 in)
- Weight: 122 kg (19 st 3 lb; 269 lb)
- School: Y Pant Comprehensive

Rugby union career
- Position: Lock
- Current team: Ospreys
Amateur team(s)
Years	Team	Apps	(Points)
- Pontyclun
–	Llantrisant		
–	Beddau		
Senior career
Years	Team	Apps	(Points)
2005–2008	Cardiff RFC	17	(0)
2006–2014	Cardiff Blues	116	(45)
2014–2016	Wasps	42	(0)
2016-2023	Ospreys	43	(10)
- Correct as of 10 April 2019
International career
Years	Team	Apps	(Points)
2009–2022	Wales	66	(0)
- Correct as of 24 November 2019 (UTC)

Bradley Scott Davies (born 9 January 1987) is a Welsh former international rugby union player for the Ospreys in the Pro14. His is the son of former Pontypridd lock Bleddyn Davies. Davies retired in 2023 to pursue a coaching career.

== Career ==
Bradley's first position as a youngster was outside half where he played for Pontyclun juniors, at the age of 14 he then found his natural position at lock. Davies went on from there to play for Beddau youth and was a member of the Cardiff Blues academy before signing a professional contract with the Blues at 18.

== International ==
Davies played for all age group levels for Wales and was captain of the under 20s squad when they won the Grand Slam in 2005.

In the summer of 2008 he was selected in the Welsh squad to tour South Africa but was not able to play due to injury. During the 2009 Six Nations Championship Davies made his Wales debut as a late replacement for Shane Williams against Scotland.

On 18 January 2010 he was named in the 35-man Wales national Squad for the 2010 Six Nations tournament.

On 26 February 2010, Davies played in a loss against France and there was a minutes silence in honour of his mother Cheryl who died aged 46 the week before.

In the 2012 Six Nations Championship, Davies was back in the red of Wales and started in their clash with Ireland in the opening match of the weekend. The lock, however, was at the centre of a controversial incident as he was sin-binned for 'tip-tackling' Donnacha Ryan. Following this incident the player was cited by match officials and subsequently received a 7-week ban for foul play.

During the All Blacks end of year European Tour, controversy arose during the Wales vs. New Zealand test match on 24 November 2012. Within the first minute of the game, All Blacks hooker Andrew Hore swung his right arm, hitting Davies hard in the jaw from behind and knocking him unconscious. This incident was missed by referee Craig Joubert and his touch-judges, and no action towards Hore was taken on the field, however it was expected that Hore would face the judiciary for his actions and he might face an end of season suspension. This incident resulted in Davies being taken off of the field and taken to a hospital for further concussion assessment.

Davies was selected as Wales captain for the two match tour of Japan in June 2013.

== Coaching career ==
Davies joined the Scarlets coaching team ahead of the 2025-2026 season.

== Personal history ==
On Saturday 9 April 2011 Bradley Davies was arrested in Saundersfoot, Wales for his involvement in a pub brawl.
