= 2012 England rugby union tour of South Africa =

- Coach: Stuart Lancaster
- Tour captain: Chris Robshaw
- Top point scorer: Owen Farrell (35)
- Top try scorer: Christian Wade (4)
- Top test point scorer: Toby Flood (20)
- Top test try scorer: Ben Youngs (2)
Summary
P	W	D	L
Total
6	3	1	2
Test match
3	0	1	2
Opponent
P	W	D	L
South Africa
3	0	1	2

Tour chronology
- ← Australasia 2010 Argentina 2013 →

In June 2012, the England national rugby union team went on a three-test tour against the South Africa national rugby union team, known colloquially and referred to hereafter as the Springboks. This was one of a series of mid-year tours in 2012 by northern teams to be hosted by southern hemisphere nations.

The series was among the first to mark a return to the format of traditional tours, after the International Rugby Board (IRB) decided in 2010 to revive the concept, which could include mid-week matches against representative or club sides. This was first such tour since South Africa had hosted New Zealand in 1996.

England last toured South Africa in 2007 and played two test matches, losing both 58 – 10 and 55 – 22. The last time the two sides met was in 2010 at Twickenham, when the Springboks won 21 – 11, marking their seventh straight win against England. Leading up to this series, both nations had played each other 32 times. The Springboks had won 19 games, England 12, and one had been drawn. England's last win against the Springboks was in 2006, when they won 23 – 21 at Twickenham. Their last victory in South Africa came in 2000, when they triumphed in Bloemfontein 27 – 22.

== Fixtures ==
Date	Home	Result	Away	Venue
27 May 2012	England XV	57–26	Barbarians	Twickenham, London
9 June 2012	South Africa	22–17	England	Kings Park Stadium, Durban
13 June 2012	SA Barbarians South	26–54	England XV	Griqua Park, Kimberley
16 June 2012	South Africa	36–27	England	Ellis Park, Johannesburg
19 June 2012	SA Barbarians North	31–57	England XV	Olën Park, Potchefstroom
23 June 2012	South Africa	14–14	England	Nelson Mandela Bay Stadium, Port Elizabeth

== Squads ==
=== England ===
On 10 May, England coach Stuart Lancaster announced his initial 42-man squad for the tour to South Africa consisting of 23 forwards and 19 backs. Thirteen uncapped players were included in the squad.

Forwards: Mouritz Botha (Saracens), Dan Cole (Leicester Tigers), Alex Corbisiero (London Irish), Paul Doran-Jones (Northampton Saints), Phil Dowson (Northampton Saints), Carl Fearns (Bath Rugby), Joe Gray (Harlequins), Dylan Hartley (Northampton Saints), James Haskell (Highlanders), Tom Johnson (Exeter Chiefs), Graham Kitchener (Leicester Tigers), Joe Launchbury (London Wasps), Joe Marler (Harlequins), Lee Mears (Bath Rugby), Ben Morgan (Scarlets), Matt Mullan (Worcester Warriors), Tom Palmer (Stade Français), Geoff Parling (Leicester Tigers), Chris Robshaw (captain, Harlequins), George Robson (Harlequins), Matt Stevens (Saracens), Thomas Waldrom (Leicester Tigers), Tom Youngs (Leicester Tigers)

Backs: Anthony Allen (Leicester Tigers), Chris Ashton (Northampton Saints), Brad Barritt (Saracens), Mike Brown (Harlequins), Danny Care (Harlequins), Lee Dickson (Northampton Saints), Owen Farrell (Saracens), Toby Flood (Leicester Tigers), Ben Foden (Northampton Saints), Alex Goode (Saracens), Charlie Hodgson (Saracens), Jonathan Joseph (London Irish), George Lowe (Harlequins), Ugo Monye (Harlequins), David Strettle (Saracens), Manu Tuilagi (Leicester Tigers), Jordan Turner-Hall (Harlequins), Christian Wade (London Wasps), Ben Youngs (Leicester Tigers)

- On 29 May, it was announced that Saracens prop Matt Stevens would miss the tour because of a shoulder injury suffered during the match against the Barbarians. Rupert Harden from Gloucester Rugby was called up to replace him.
- On 1 June, it was announced that London Wasps lock Joe Launchbury had been ruled out of the tour after suffering a knee injury in a training session. He was replaced by Jamie Gibson from London Irish.
- Harlequins fullback Mike Brown suffered a fracture and ligament damage to his right thumb during the First Test in Durban on 9 June. He was sent home and replaced by Nick Abendanon from Bath Rugby.
- Harlequins wing George Lowe damaged ligaments in his left ankle during the mid-week match against the SA Barbarians South on 13 June. He was sent home and replaced by Jonny May from Gloucester.
- After an outstanding performance in the Second Test in Johannesburg, scrumhalf Ben Youngs was found to have a shoulder injury and was replaced by Karl Dickson from Harlequins.

=== South Africa ===
On 2 June, new Springbok head coach Heyneke Meyer announced his squad of 32 players for the series. Nine uncapped players were included in the squad.

Forwards: Willem Alberts (Sharks), Marcell Coetzee (The Sharks), Keegan Daniel (The Sharks), Bismarck du Plessis (The Sharks), Jannie du Plessis (The Sharks), Eben Etzebeth (Western Province), Ryan Kankowski (The Sharks), Juandré Kruger (Blue Bulls), Werner Kruger (Blue Bulls), Tendai Mtawarira (The Sharks), Coenie Oosthuizen (Free State Cheetahs), Jacques Potgieter (Blue Bulls), Chiliboy Ralepelle (Blue Bulls), Pierre Spies (Blue Bulls), Adriaan Strauss (Free State Cheetahs), Flip van der Merwe (Blue Bulls), Franco van der Merwe (Golden Lions)

Backs: Bjorn Basson (Blue Bulls), Jean de Villiers (Western Province), JJ Engelbrecht (Blue Bulls), Bryan Habana (Western Province), Francois Hougaard (Blue Bulls), Elton Jantjies (Golden Lions), Zane Kirchner (Blue Bulls), Patrick Lambie (Sharks), Lwazi Mvovo (The Sharks), Wynand Olivier (Blue Bulls), Ruan Pienaar (Ulster), JP Pietersen (The Sharks), François Steyn (The Sharks), Morné Steyn (Blue Bulls), Jano Vermaak (Blue Bulls)

- On 4 June, veteran centre Jean de Villiers was appointed as the 54th Springbok Captain. He became the most experienced player to lead the national side, having been capped 72 times before being given the captain's armband. De Villiers would captain South Africa until at least the end of this tour.
- Due to injury concerns over fullback Zane Kirchner (knee) and prop Coenie Oosthuizen (shoulder/neck) after the First Test in Durban, Dean Greyling and Gio Aplon were called up to replace them. It was later revealed that Oosthuizen was suffering from a bulging disc and would be sidelined for three months.
- Sharks centre François Steyn was unavailable for the Third Test in Port Elizabeth because his wedding was on that day. Injury concerns over Patrick Lambie after the Second Test resulted in Western Province fullback Joe Pietersen being included in the squad.

== Pre-tour warm-up ==
27 May 2012
14:30 BST (UTC+01)

England	57–26	Barbarians
Try: Ashton (3) 17' c, 37' c, 43' c Hartley 34' m Wade 57' c Wigglesworth 66' c Joseph (2) 69' c, 79' c Con: Farrell (7/8) 17', 38', 44', 57', 67', 70', 80'; Pen: Farrell (1/2) 2'	Report	Try: Muliaina (2) 31' m, 47' c Tindall 63' c Taele 71' c Con: Donald (2/3) 32', 64'; Contepomi (1/1) 72'

Twickenham Stadium, London
Attendance: 42,269
Referee: John Lacey (Ireland)

FB	15	Ben Foden	(substituted off) 50'
RW	14	Chris Ashton
OC	13	Brad Barritt
IC	12	Owen Farrell
LW	11	Christian Wade
FH	10	Charlie Hodgson
SH	9	Lee Dickson	(substituted off) 60'
N8	8	Phil Dowson (c)	(substituted off) 67'
OF	7	Carl Fearns	(substituted off) 55'
BF	6	Tom Johnson	(substituted off) 50'
RL	5	Tom Palmer
LL	4	Mouritz Botha	(substituted off) 55'
TP	3	Paul Doran-Jones
HK	2	Dylan Hartley
LP	1	Matt Stevens	(substituted off) 40'
Replacements:
HK	16	Lee Mears	(substituted in) 67'
PR	17	Matt Mullan	(substituted in) 40'
LK	18	Joe Launchbury	(substituted in) 55'
FL	19	Jamie Gibson	(substituted in) 55'
SH	20	Richard Wigglesworth	(substituted in) 60'
CE	21	Jonathan Joseph	(substituted in) 50'
FB	22	Alex Goode	(substituted in) 50'
Coach:
(England) Stuart Lancaster

FB	15	(New Zealand) Mils Muliaina
RW	14	(England) Paul Sackey	(substituted off) 45'
OC	13	(New Zealand) Casey Laulala
IC	12	(England) Mike Tindall	(substituted off) 67'
LW	11	(England) Iain Balshaw
FH	10	(New Zealand) Stephen Donald
SH	9	(Scotland) Rory Lawson	(substituted off) 56'
N8	8	(Scotland) Johnnie Beattie	(substituted off) 67'
OF	7	(Fiji) Akapusi Qera	(substituted off) 59'
BF	6	(South Africa) Ernst Joubert
RL	5	(South Africa) Anton van Zyl
LL	4	(Australia) Mark Chisholm
TP	3	(New Zealand) John Afoa
HK	2	(South Africa) John Smit (c)	(substituted off) 59'
LP	1	(New Zealand) Neemia Tialata	(substituted off) 59'
Replacements:
HK	16	(France) Benoît August	(substituted in) 59'
PR	17	(Wales) Duncan Jones	(substituted in) 59'
LK	18	(Samoa) Pelu Taele	(substituted in) 67'
N8	19	(France) Raphaël Lakafia	(substituted in) 59'
SH	20	(France) Jérôme Fillol	(substituted in) 56'
FH	21	(Argentina) Felipe Contepomi	(substituted in) 67'
WG	22	(Samoa) Sailosi Tagicakibau	(substituted in) 45'
Coach:
(New Zealand) John Kirwan

Assistant referees:
Peter Fitzgibbon (Ireland)
Simon McDowell (Ireland)

- As per tradition, the Barbarians' side featured uncapped players: Jérôme Fillol, Ernst Joubert and Anton van Zyl.

== Test matches ==
=== First Test – 9 June ===
The First Test of the series was played at Kings Park Stadium in Durban. The event was a historic occasion, because it was the first time that England and South Africa had played each other in Durban; England had played at Kings Park during the 1995 Rugby World Cup, but they did not face South Africa in the tournament. In the 27 test matches the Springboks had played there since 1962, they had won 16 matches, lost 8 and drawn 3.

The Springboks named three uncapped players in the starting line-up: locks Eben Etzebeth and Juandré Kruger, and flanker Marcell Coetzee. Uncapped prop Coenie Oosthuizen was named on the bench.

England selected two uncapped players to make their debut in the starting line-up: flanker Tom Johnson and prop Joe Marler. Uncapped back Jonathan Joseph was named on the bench.

9 June 2012
17:00 SAST (UTC+02)

South Africa	22–17	England
Try: M. Steyn 47' m de Villiers 59' m Pen: M. Steyn (4/5) 13', 29', 69', 77'	Report	Try: Foden 80' m Pen: Farrell (4/4) 6', 26', 63', 65'

Mr Price Kings Park, Durban
Attendance: 43,052
Referee: Steve Walsh (Australia)

FB	15	Zane Kirchner	(substituted off) 40'
RW	14	JP Pietersen
OC	13	Jean de Villiers (c)
IC	12	Frans Steyn
LW	11	Bryan Habana	(substituted off) 31'	(substituted in) 40'
FH	10	Morné Steyn
SH	9	Francois Hougaard	(substituted off) 56'
N8	8	Pierre Spies
OF	7	Willem Alberts
BF	6	Marcell Coetzee	(substituted off) 72'
RL	5	Juandré Kruger
LL	4	Eben Etzebeth	(substituted off) 58'
TP	3	Jannie du Plessis	(substituted off) 49'	(substituted in) 58'
HK	2	Bismarck du Plessis	(substituted off) 65'
LP	1	Tendai Mtawarira	(substituted off) 58'
Replacements:
HK	16	Adriaan Strauss	(substituted in) 65'
PR	17	Coenie Oosthuizen	(substituted in) 49'
LK	18	Flip van der Merwe	(substituted in) 58'
FL	19	Keegan Daniel	(substituted in) 72'
SH	20	Ruan Pienaar	(substituted in) 56'
FB	21	Patrick Lambie	(substituted in) 40'
WG	22	Wynand Olivier	(substituted in) 31'	(substituted off) 40'
Coach:
(South Africa) Heyneke Meyer

FB	15	Mike Brown	(substituted off) 78'
RW	14	Chris Ashton
OC	13	Manu Tuilagi
IC	12	Brad Barritt	(substituted off) 53'
LW	11	Ben Foden
FH	10	Owen Farrell
SH	9	Ben Youngs	(substituted off) 72'
N8	8	Ben Morgan
OF	7	Chris Robshaw (c)
BF	6	Tom Johnson
RL	5	Geoff Parling
LL	4	Mouritz Botha	(substituted off) 58'
TP	3	Dan Cole
HK	2	Dylan Hartley	(substituted off) 75'
LP	1	Joe Marler	(substituted off) 72'
Replacements:
HK	16	Lee Mears	(substituted in) 75'
PR	17	Paul Doran-Jones	(substituted in) 72'
LK	18	Tom Palmer	(substituted in) 58'
N8	19	Phil Dowson
SH	20	Lee Dickson	(substituted in) 72'
FH	21	Toby Flood	(substituted in) 53'
FB	22	Jonathan Joseph	(substituted in) 78'
Coach:
(England) Stuart Lancaster

Assistant referees:
Alain Rolland (Ireland)
Simon McDowell (Ireland)
Television match official:
Iain Ramage (Scotland)

- Four players made their full international debut for South Africa: Marcell Coetzee, Eben Etzebeth, Juandré Kruger and Coenie Oosthuizen.
- Three players made their full international debut for England: Tom Johnson, Joe Marler and Jonathan Joseph

==== First half ====
There was heavy rain in Durban which eased before kick-off, as well as a blustery wind. As expected, both sides went in hard early. England looked composed enough, managing to repel a Springbok line-out from inside their 22 after they failed to handle Morné Steyn's kick-off. But a box kick from Youngs carried too far and ended up in the hands of speedy wing Habana, who slipped several tackles before being finally brought down on halfway. That moment aside, England's determination paid off when, six minutes in, the debutant Etzebeth was penalised for not rolling away after the tackle. Farrell converted the 40-metre penalty goal to open the scoring, 3 – 0. The home side finally came to life ten minutes into the match, and with 14 minutes gone on the clock, Morné Steyn levelled the scores from point-blank range 3 – 3 when England was penalised for being offside after some strong running by Sharks flanker Alberts. England continued to resist attack after attack from the Springboks, especially when, at the 20-minute mark, Hougaard found space in attack and passed to Spies, who was tackled by Tuilagi just inches short of the tryline.

Finally, in a rare foray forward, Johnson, who impressed many observers on debut with his work rate, drew the defence before he passed to the number eight Morgan, who powered his way through South Africa's defence. Coetzee interfered illegally for the Springboks, and Farrell converted the subsequent penalty to regain the lead for England 6 – 3 at the 27-minute mark of the match. South Africa replied swiftly after England was again penalised for being offside. Steyn converted the penalty to again level the scores 6 – 6.

Habana then injured himself when he chased a high kick from Morne Steyn and collided with England fullback Brown. A big chance for England went begging when Youngs found Ashton in midfield, who sidestepped Kirchner and took the ball up 30 metres only to spill it as he was brought down from behind by Hougaard. A series of deep kicks ensued as both sides tried to establish territory. In the final minute of the half, Johnson was penalised for using his hands in a scrum, but Steyn's penalty attempt drifted wide to leave the teams even at 6 – 6 at half time.

==== Second half ====
The Springboks made two changes to their team during the break. Habana came back on and Lambie replaced Kirchner, who was suffering from a knee problem serious enough to rule him out of the next test. England made no changes. England made a promising start after Youngs found a gap in the Springbok defence. But South Africa struck the first blow when Morné Steyn dotted down in the right corner in the 47th minute after he had been involved in the attacking build-up that featured a storming run by Jannie du Plessis. Steyn's conversion attempt was just wide, so the score remained 11 – 6.

The Springboks wasted a chance to score again several minutes later. After they were awarded a penalty deep in England's 22, Hougaard chose to tap and go instead of letting M. Steyn take the kick for a penalty goal. The English then managed to turn the ball over. Flood was brought on to replace Barritt, who sustained an eye injury. There was a minor flare-up on the touchline between De Villiers and Farrell, but that was quickly sorted out by the officials.

Hougaard was replaced by Pienaar. Habana showed he was suffering no ill-effects from his first half injury, twice nearly getting through England's defence. The Springboks finally broke through again when they so severely disrupted an England scrum that Youngs was forced to clear under pressure. Habana caught the ball and ran it straight back. From the resultant ruck, the Springboks quickly spread the ball wide for captain De Villiers to cut inside and touch down in the right corner, making the score 16 – 6. But again, Steyn missed the conversion attempt, this time spraying it across the posts.

Lancaster replaced Morgan with Dowson, and England's reply was almost immediate. The Springboks misjudged the kick-off, which allowed Foden to intercept the ball and race towards the tryline. Again, the Springboks managed to scramble and again, Habana hurt himself, this time colliding with Frans Steyn. Referee Walsh penalised the Springboks for offside and Farrell slotted the penalty to take the score to 16 – 9.

But England was not finished yet. Barely two minutes later, England captain Robshaw managed to isolate Pietersen in a ruck and win a penalty for his team. Farrell duly converted and suddenly, with the score 16 – 12 with less than 15 minutes to go, the game was again up for grabs.

Strauss came on for Bismarck du Plessis at hooker, and had an immediate impact. The Springboks seized back the momentum and swept forward, with Strauss, Pienaar and Coetzee prominent. Tuilagi was penalised for offside and Steyn, after three consecutive misses, nailed the penalty to restore the seven-point gap. The score was now 19 – 12 with ten minutes remaining.

Both sides made changes: for England, Dickson came on for Youngs; for South Africa, Daniel replaced Coetzee. England tried to create chances, most notably when Tuilagi again bumped De Villiers off whilst going forward. But there was no support and he was penalised for continuing to play the ball after being brought to ground.

The killer blow for England came when they had a scrum feed in their half at the 75-minute mark. The Springbok forwards timed their shove perfectly, causing England to buckle under pressure and thus earning a scrum feed. On the resultant scrum, Doran-Jones, who was just brought on for Marler, was penalised for collapsing the scrum. Steyn converted the penalty to put the game, with the score 22 – 12 and only two minutes remaining, virtually out of England's reach.

Nevertheless, England continued to fight. Joseph was brought on for Brown and, despite the limited game time, was involved in the movement which led to the try that England needed when Foden scored in the corner. However, it was too little too late. Farrell's attempted conversion after the hooter sailed wide. So the final score was 22 – 17. The Springboks had drawn first blood and led the series one-nil.

=== Second Test – 16 June ===
The Second Test was played at Ellis Park in Johannesburg. This would be the third time that England and South Africa had played each other at the venue. The previous occasion the two sides had met at Ellis Park was back in 1984 when the Springboks won 35 – 9 courtesy of a hat-trick to Danie Gerber. However, England had claimed one of their few precious wins in South Africa at this venue back in 1972, when they won 18 – 9. In the 43 test matches the Springboks had played at Ellis Park since 1928, they had won 30 matches, lost 11 and drawn 2.

The Springboks made three changes to their match squad: Patrick Lambie replaced the injured Kirchner at fullback, and Bjorn Basson was called up to fill the vacant replacement spot. Werner Kruger was also called up to cover for the injured Coenie Oosthuizen.

England made more changes to the starting XV, some of the changes forced due to injury. Most of the changes occurred in the backline; Ben Foden replaced the injured Mike Brown at fullback, and Jonathan Joseph was given his first Test start after Brad Barritt was sidelined with a lacerated eyeball. This also meant that Manu Tuilagi was shifted from outside centre to inside centre to accommodate Joseph at number 13. Foden's shift to fullback meant David Strettle was handed a starting berth on the wing. Toby Flood replaced Owen Farrell at fly-half. Up front the only change was the inclusion of Thomas Waldrom after Phil Dowson was sent home with a hamstring injury.

16 June 2012
17:00 SAST (UTC+02)

South Africa	36–27	England
Try: Alberts 4' m B. du Plessis 9' c Hougaard 19' c Pietersen 73' m Con: M. Steyn (2/4) 10', 20'; Pen: M. Steyn (3/6) 15', 46', 58'; Drop: M. Steyn (1/1) 26'	Report	Try: Flood 23' c Youngs (2) 51' c, 61' c Con: Flood (3/3) 24', 52', 62'; Pen: Flood (2/2) 9', 64'

Ellis Park Stadium, Johannesburg
Attendance: 60,101
Referee: Alain Rolland (Ireland)

FB	15	Patrick Lambie	(substituted off) 44'
RW	14	JP Pietersen
OC	13	Jean de Villiers (c)
IC	12	Frans Steyn
LW	11	Bryan Habana	(substituted off) 57'
FH	10	Morné Steyn
SH	9	Francois Hougaard
N8	8	Pierre Spies
OF	7	Willem Alberts	(substituted off) 52'
BF	6	Marcell Coetzee
RL	5	Juandré Kruger	(substituted off) 62'
LL	4	Eben Etzebeth
TP	3	Jannie du Plessis	(substituted off) 59'
HK	2	Bismarck du Plessis	(substituted off) 60'
LP	1	Tendai Mtawarira
Replacements:
HK	16	Adriaan Strauss	(substituted in) 60'
PR	17	Werner Kruger	(substituted in) 59'
LK	18	Flip van der Merwe	(substituted in) 62'
FL	19	Keegan Daniel	(substituted in) 52'
SH	20	Ruan Pienaar	(substituted in) 57'
WG	21	Wynand Olivier	(substituted in) 44'
FB	22	Bjorn Basson
Coach:
(South Africa) Heyneke Meyer

FB	15	Ben Foden
RW	14	Chris Ashton
OC	13	Jonathan Joseph	(substituted off) 77'
IC	12	Manu Tuilagi
LW	11	David Strettle	(substituted off) 59'
FH	10	Toby Flood
SH	9	Ben Youngs	(substituted off) 74'
N8	8	Ben Morgan	(substituted off) 46'
OF	7	Chris Robshaw (c)
BF	6	Tom Johnson
RL	5	Geoff Parling
LL	4	Mouritz Botha	(substituted off) 44'
TP	3	Dan Cole	(substituted off) 49'	(substituted in) 56'
HK	2	Dylan Hartley	(substituted off) 74'
LP	1	Joe Marler	(substituted off) 56'
Replacements:
HK	16	Lee Mears	(substituted in) 74'
PR	17	Alex Corbisiero	(substituted in) 49'
LK	18	Tom Palmer	(substituted in) 44'
FL	19	Thomas Waldrom	(substituted in) 46'
SH	20	Lee Dickson	(substituted in) 74'
FH	21	Owen Farrell	(substituted in) 59'
FB	22	Alex Goode	(substituted in) 77'
Coach:
(England) Stuart Lancaster

Assistant referees:
Steve Walsh (Australia)
Simon McDowell (Ireland)
Television match official:
Iain Ramage (Scotland)

=== Third test – 16 June ===
23 June 2012
17:00 SAST (UTC+02)

South Africa	14–14	England
Try: Pietersen 61' m Pen: M. Steyn (3/5) 6', 15', 27'	Report	Try: Care 11' m Pen: Flood (1/2) 2'; Farrell (2/2) 44', 71'

Nelson Mandela Bay Stadium, Port Elizabeth
Attendance: 45,000
Referee: Steve Walsh (Australia)

FB	15	Gio Aplon
RW	14	JP Pietersen
OC	13	Jean de Villiers (c)
IC	12	Wynand Olivier
LW	11	Bryan Habana
FH	10	Morné Steyn
SH	9	Francois Hougaard	(substituted off) 49'
N8	8	Pierre Spies
OF	7	Jacques Potgieter	(substituted off) 54'
BF	6	Marcell Coetzee
RL	5	Juandré Kruger
LL	4	Eben Etzebeth	(substituted off) 54'
TP	3	Jannie du Plessis	(substituted off) 75'
HK	2	Bismarck du Plessis	(substituted off) 63'
LP	1	Tendai Mtawarira
Replacements:
HK	16	Adriaan Strauss	(substituted in) 63'
PR	17	Werner Kruger	(substituted in) 75'
LK	18	Flip van der Merwe	(substituted in) 54'
FL	19	Ryan Kankowski	(substituted in) 54'
SH	20	Ruan Pienaar	(substituted in) 49'
FB	21	Elton Jantjies
WG	22	Bjorn Basson
Coach:
(South Africa) Heyneke Meyer

FB	15	Alex Goode
RW	14	Chris Ashton
OC	13	Jonathan Joseph					(substituted off) 63'
IC	12	Manu Tuilagi
LW	11	Ben Foden
FH	10	Toby Flood		(substituted off) 12'
SH	9	Danny Care
N8	8	Thomas Waldrom
OF	7	James Haskell
BF	6	Tom Johnson		(substituted off) 54'	(substituted in) 61'	(substituted off) 66'
RL	5	Geoff Parling
LL	4	Tom Palmer		(substituted off) 66'
TP	3	Dan Cole
HK	2	Dylan Hartley (c)	(yellow card) 51' to 61'
LP	1	Alex Corbisiero
Replacements:
HK	16	Lee Mears		(substituted in) 54'	(substituted off) 61'
PR	17	Joe Marler
LK	18	Mouritz Botha		(substituted in) 66'
N8	19	Phil Dowson				(substituted in) 66'
SH	20	Lee Dickson
FH	21	Owen Farrell		(substituted in) 12'	(substituted off) 27'	(substituted in) 35'
OC	22	Brad Barritt			(substituted in) 27'	(substituted off) 35'	(substituted in) 63'
Coach:
(England) Stuart Lancaster

Assistant referees:
Nigel Owens (Wales)
John Lacey (Ireland)
Television match official:
Giulio De Santis (Italy)

== Tour matches ==
=== SA Barbarians South ===
13 June 2012
14:30 SAST (UTC+02)

SA Barbarians South	26–54	England
Try: Engelbrecht 2' c Franklin 34' c Nelson 55' c Dukisa 65' m Con: Watts (3/4) 3', 35', 56'	Report	Try: Waldrom (2) 17' c, 49' m Wade (3) 19' m, 62' c, 80' m Lowe 22' c Kitchener 57' m Care 76' c Con: Hodgson (4/8) 18', 23', 63', 76'; Pen: Hodgson (2/2) 6', 13'

GWK Park, Kimberley
Referee: Jonathan Kaplan (South Africa)

FB	15	Jacquin Jansen
RW	14	Cornal Hendricks
OC	13	Kempie Rautenbach	(substituted off) 45'
IC	12	Wayne Stevens (c)
LW	11	Norman Nelson	(substituted off) 66'
FH	10	Elgar Watts
SH	9	Boela Abrahams	(substituted off) 50'
N8	8	Jacques Engelbrecht
OF	7	Shaun Raubenheimer	(substituted off) 60'
BF	6	Mpho Mbiyozo
RL	5	David Bulbring	(substituted off) 74'
LL	4	Nolan Clark
TP	3	Ross Geldenhuys	(substituted off) 60'	(substituted in) 77'
HK	2	Hannes Franklin	(substituted off) 51'
LP	1	Corné Fourie	(substituted off) 77'
Replacements:
HK	16	Clemen Lewis	(substituted in) 51'
PR	17	Dean Hopp	(substituted in) 60'
LK	18	Samora Fihlani	(substituted in) 74'
LK	19	Zandré Jordaan	(substituted in) 60'
SH	20	Ntando Kebe	(substituted in) 50'
FH	21	Ricardo Croy	(substituted in) 66'
WG	22	Ntabeni Dukisa	(substituted in) 45'
Coach:
(South Africa) Jimmy Stonehouse

FB	15	Alex Goode		(substituted off) 40'
RW	14	George Lowe		(substituted off) 41'
OC	13	Anthony Allen
IC	12	Jordan Turner-Hall
LW	11	Christian Wade
FH	10	Charlie Hodgson
SH	9	Danny Care
N8	8	Thomas Waldrom		(substituted off) 66'
OF	7	Carl Fearns		(substituted off) 47'
BF	6	James Haskell	(yellow card) 31' to 41'
RL	5	George Robson (c)
LL	4	Graham Kitchener
TP	3	Paul Doran-Jones		(substituted off) 59'
HK	2	Joe Gray		(substituted off) 47'
LP	1	Matt Mullan
Replacements:
HK	16	Tom Youngs		(substituted in) 47'
PR	17	Rupert Harden		(substituted in) 47'
LK	18	Tom Palmer
FL	19	Jamie Gibson		(substituted in) 47'
SH	20	Lee Dickson		(substituted in) 41'
N8	21	Phil Dowson		(substituted in) 66'
WG	22	Nick Abendanon		(substituted in) 40'
Coach:
(England) Stuart Lancaster

Assistant referees:
Mark Lawrence (South Africa)
Pro Legoete (South Africa)
Television match official:
Gerrie Coetzee (South Africa)

=== SA Barbarians North ===
19 June 2012
19:10 SAST (UTC+02)

SA Barbarians North	31–57	England
Try: Engelbrecht 15' c Venter (2) 52' c, 55' c Scholtz 76' c Con: Roos (4/4); Pen: Roos (1/1) 5'	Report	Try: Abendanon (3) 18' c, 31' c, 35' c Morgan 23' c May (2) 62' m, 69' c Allen 74' c Penalty try 79' c Con: Hodgson (7/8); Pen: Hodgson (1/1) 6'

Profert Olën Park, Potchefstroom
Attendance: 9,437

FB	15	JC Roos
RW	14	Danwel Demas
OC	13	JW Jonker (c)
IC	12	Joubert Engelbrecht
LW	11	Deon Scholtz	(substituted off) 77'
FH	10	Coenie van Wyk	(substituted off) 73'
SH	9	Shaun Venter	(substituted off) 75'
N8	8	Nicky Steyn
OF	7	MB Lusaseni	(substituted off) 67'
BF	6	Jaco Bouwer	(substituted off) 68'
RL	5	Rudi Mathee
LL	4	Eduan van der Walt	(substituted off) 61'
TP	3	Ashley Buys	(substituted off) 71'
HK	2	Torsten van Jaarsveld
LP	1	BG Uys
Replacements:
HK	16	Pellow van der Westhuizen	(substituted in) 68'
PR	17	Zane Killian	(substituted in) 71'
LK	18	Boela Serfontein	(substituted in) 61'
FL	19	Martin Sithole	(substituted in) 67'
SH	20	Andries Mahoney	(substituted in) 75'
FH	21	Hoffmann Maritz	(substituted in) 73'
WG	22	Tertius Maarman	(substituted in) 77'
Coach:
(South Africa) Jimmy Stonehouse

FB	15	Nick Abendanon
RW	14	Christian Wade		(substituted off) 67'
OC	13	Anthony Allen
IC	12	Jordan Turner-Hall
LW	11	Ugo Monye		(substituted off) 26'
FH	10	Charlie Hodgson
SH	9	Lee Dickson		(substituted off) 40'
N8	8	Ben Morgan
OF	7	Carl Fearns
BF	6	Jamie Gibson	(yellow card) 54' to 64'
RL	5	George Robson (c)
LL	4	Graham Kitchener		(substituted off) 57'
TP	3	Paul Doran-Jones		(substituted off) 67'
HK	2	Tom Youngs		(substituted off) 57'
LP	1	Matt Mullan
Replacements:
HK	16	Joe Gray		(substituted in) 57'
PR	17	Rupert Harden		(substituted in) 67'
LK	18	Mouritz Botha		(substituted in) 57'
FL	19	James Haskell
SH	20	Karl Dickson		(substituted in) 40'
WG	21	David Strettle		(substituted in) 67'
OC	22	Jonny May		(substituted in) 26'
Coach:
(England) Stuart Lancaster

Assistant referees:
Jonathan Kaplan (South Africa)
Pro Legoete (South Africa)
Television match official:
Johan Meuwesen (South Africa)

== See also ==
- 2012 mid-year rugby test series
