= 2011–12 Premiership Rugby =

Rugby union competition in England

2011–12 Aviva Premiership
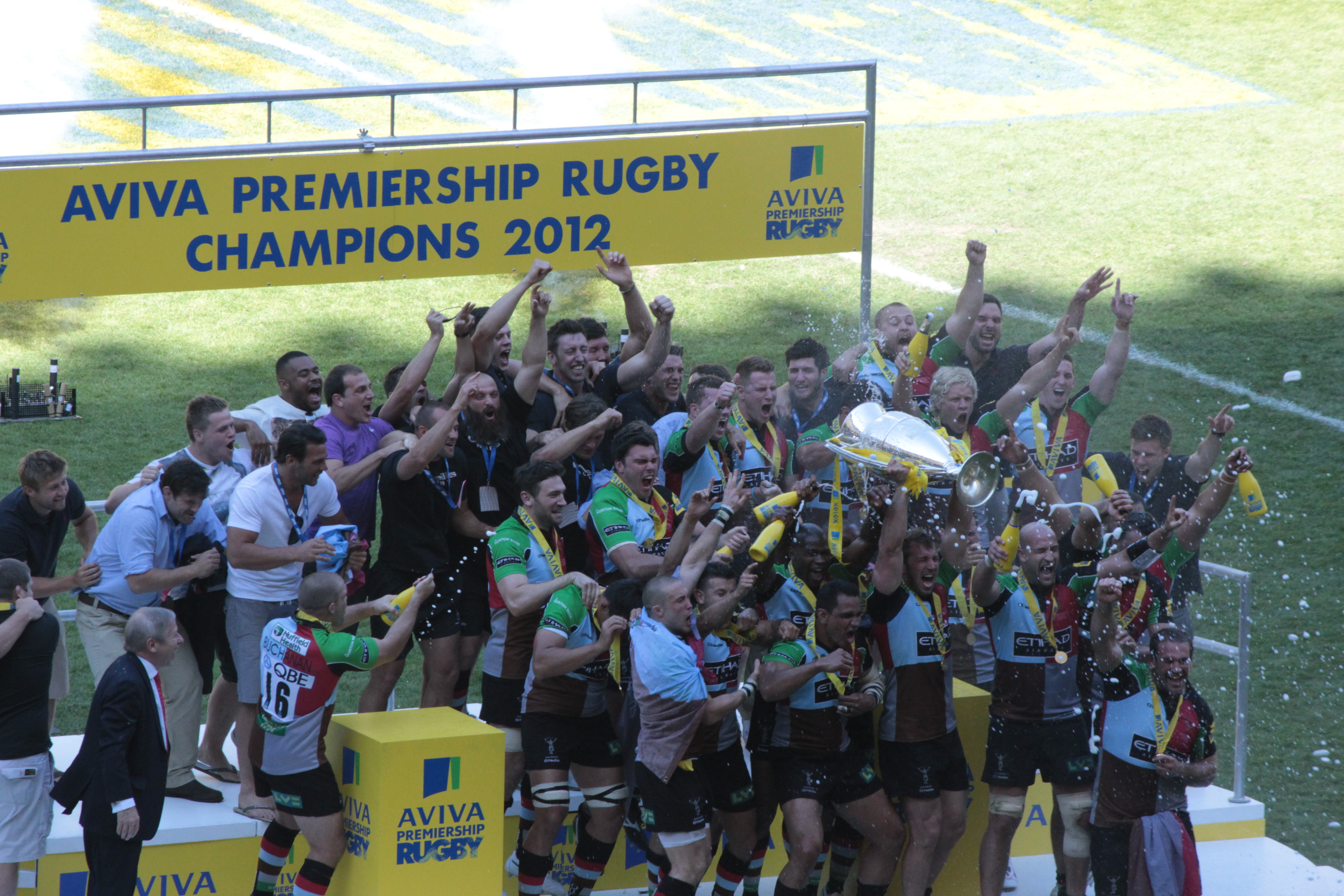
- Countries: England
- Date: 3 September 2011 – 26 May 2012
- Champions: Harlequins (1st title)
- Runners-up: Leicester Tigers
- Relegated: Newcastle Falcons
- Matches played: 135
- Attendance: 1,755,073 (average 13,001 per match)
- Tries scored: 488 (average 3.6 per match)
- Top point scorer: Tom Homer (London Irish) (278 points)
- Top try scorer: Rob Miller (Sale) (10 tries)

Official website
- www.premiershiprugby.com

The 2011–12 Aviva Premiership was the 25th season of the top flight English domestic rugby union competition and the second one to be sponsored by Aviva. The reigning champions entering the season were Saracens, who had claimed their first title after defeating Leicester Tigers in the 2011 final. Worcester Warriors had been promoted as champions from the 2010–11 RFU Championship at the first attempt.

== Summary ==
Harlequins won their first title after defeating Leicester Tigers in the final at Twickenham having also topped the regular season table. Newcastle Falcons were relegated on the last day of the season. It was the second time that Newcastle have been relegated from the top flight since the leagues began and the first time since the 1993–94 Premiership Rugby season.

As usual, round 1 included the London Double Header at Twickenham, the eighth instance since its inception in 2004.

== Rule changes ==
This season saw the first major change in the Premiership's salary cap, which at the time stood at £4 million per team. In what is now a permanent feature of the cap system, academy credits were introduced. Each team receives a £30,000 credit for every home-grown player in their senior squad, with a maximum of eight such credits. In addition, a standard provision of the cap system that applies only in seasons that run up against the Rugby World Cup provided each team with a credit of £30,000 for each senior squad player that participated in the World Cup.

== Teams ==
Twelve teams compete in the league – the top eleven teams from the previous season and Worcester Warriors who were promoted from the 2010–11 RFU Championship after a top flight absence of one year. They replaced Leeds Carnege who were relegated after two years in the top flight.

=== Stadiums and locations ===
2011–12 Aviva Premiership Teams

Club	Director of Rugby/Head Coach	Captain	Kit Supplier	Stadium	Capacity	City/Area
Bath	(Scotland) Ian McGeechan	(England) Stuart Hooper	Puma	The Recreation Ground	12,300	Bath
Exeter Chiefs	(England) Rob Baxter	(Ireland) Tommy Hayes	Samurai Sportswear	Sandy Park	10,744	Exeter
Gloucester	Vacant	(England) Luke Narraway	KooGa	Kingsholm	16,500	Gloucester
Harlequins	(Ireland) Conor O'Shea	(England) Chris Robshaw	O'Neills	Twickenham Stoop (Note: Harlequins will also play a home game at Twickenham Stadium on 27 December 2011)	14,600	Twickenham, Greater London
Leicester Tigers	(England) Richard Cockerill	(Ireland) Geordan Murphy	Cotton Traders	Welford Road	24,000	Leicester
London Irish	(England) Toby Booth	(New Zealand) Clarke Dermody	ISC	Madejski Stadium (Note: London Irish will also play a home game at Twickenham Stadium on 3 September 2011)	24,250	Reading
London Wasps	(Wales) Dai Young	(South Africa) Marco Wentzel	Canterbury	Adams Park	10,516	High Wycombe
Newcastle Falcons	(New Zealand) Peter Russell	(England) James Hudson	Orion	Kingston Park	10,200	Newcastle upon Tyne
Northampton Saints	(England) Jim Mallinder	(England) Dylan Hartley	BURRDA	Franklin's Gardens	13,591	Northampton
Sale Sharks	(Scotland) Bryan Redpath	(New Zealand) Sam Tuitupou	Cotton Traders	Edgeley Park	10,852	Stockport, Greater Manchester
Saracens	(Ireland) Mark McCall	(England) Steve Borthwick	Nike	Vicarage Road (Note: Saracens will also play a home game at Twickenham Stadium on 3 September 2011 and a home game at Wembley Stadium on 31 March 2012)	19,920	Watford
Worcester Warriors	(England) Richard Hill	(England) Shaun Perry	Cotton Traders	Sixways Stadium	12,068	Worcester

== Pre-season ==
The 2011 edition of the Premiership Rugby Sevens Series began on 15 July 2011 at The Recreation Ground, continued on 22 July at Franklin's Gardens and 29 July at Edgeley Park. This was the first opportunity of the season for any of the teams competing in the Premiership to win a trophy. The finals were held on 5 August 2011 at The Stoop and the Series was won by Newcastle Falcons.

== Table ==
2011–12 Premiership Rugby Table
Pos	Team	Pld	W	D	L	PF	PA	PD	TF	TA	TB	LB	Pts	Qualification or relegation
1	Harlequins (C)	22	17	1	4	526	389	+137	53	33	4	1	75	Play-off place, Berth in the 2012–13 Heineken Cup
2	Leicester Tigers (RU)	22	15	1	6	647	475	+172	70	45	9	3	74	Play-off place, Berth in the 2012–13 Heineken Cup
3	Saracens (SF)	22	16	1	5	489	350	+139	35	29	3	4	73	Play-off place, Berth in the 2012–13 Heineken Cup
4	Northampton Saints (SF)	22	14	0	8	539	374	+165	51	31	5	4	65	Play-off place, Berth in the 2012–13 Heineken Cup
5	Exeter Chiefs	22	12	0	10	436	421	+15	39	38	3	8	59	Berth in the 2012–13 Heineken Cup
6	Sale Sharks	22	10	0	12	453	538	−85	42	46	2	7	49	Berth in the 2012–13 Heineken Cup
7	London Irish	22	8	1	13	514	516	−2	46	43	3	9	46	2012–13 European Challenge Cup
8	Bath Rugby	22	9	0	13	365	412	−47	32	29	2	6	44	2012–13 European Challenge Cup
9	Gloucester Rugby	22	8	1	13	456	507	−51	42	47	1	9	44	2012–13 European Challenge Cup
10	Worcester Warriors	22	7	1	14	322	448	−126	23	46	0	6	36	2012–13 European Challenge Cup
11	London Wasps	22	6	0	16	363	502	−139	30	45	1	8	33	2012–13 European Challenge Cup
12	Newcastle Falcons (Note: The champion of the Championship (London Welsh) are eligible for promotion.) (R)	22	6	2	14	351	529	−178	25	56	0	4	32	Relegated

Source: Premiership Rugby
Rules for classification: Tiebreakers for teams tied on points: 1) Number of matches won; 2) Difference between points for and against; 3) Total number of points for; 4) Aggregate number of points scored in matches between tied teams; 5) Number of matches won excluding the first match, then the second and so on until the tie is settled
(C) Champions; (RU) Runners-up; (SF) Losing semi-finalists; (R) Relegated

== Regular season ==
=== Round 1 ===
3 September 2011
14:00

London Irish	24-29	Harlequins
	Report

Twickenham
Attendance: 55,437
Referee: Greg Garner

3 September 2011
15:00

Leicester Tigers	28-30	Exeter Chiefs
	Report

Welford Road
Attendance: 18,251
Referee: Tim Wigglesworth

3 September 2011
15:00

Worcester Warriors	17-12	Sale Sharks
	Report

Sixways
Attendance: 8,602

3 September 2011
16:30

Saracens	15-20	London Wasps
	Report

Twickenham
Attendance: 55,437

3 September 2011
18:30

Newcastle Falcons	9-22	Bath Rugby
	Report

Kingston Park
Attendance: 3,250
Referee: Martin Fox

4 September 2011
15:30

Northampton Saints	26-24	Gloucester Rugby
	Report

Franklin's Gardens
Attendance: 13,124
Referee: Andrew Small

=== Round 2 ===
9 September 2011
19:45

Harlequins	26-13	Northampton Saints
	Report

Twickenham Stoop
Attendance: 10,990
Referee: Greg Garner

9 September 2011
19:45

Sale Sharks	30-29	London Irish
	Report

Edgeley Park
Attendance: 6,547
Referee: Sean Davey

10 September 2011
15:00

Exeter Chiefs	32-15	Newcastle Falcons
	Report

Sandy Park
Attendance: 5,405
Referee: Chris White

10 September 2011
15:00

Gloucester Rugby	29-8	Worcester Warriors
	Report

Kingsholm
Attendance: 12,604

10 September 2011
15:15

Bath Rugby	26-28	Saracens
	Report

Recreation Ground
Attendance: 10,085
Referee: Greg Garner

11 September 2011
14:15

London Wasps	35-29	Leicester Tigers
	Report

Adams Park
Attendance: 5,078
Referee: Andrew Small

=== Round 3 ===
17 September 2011
15:00

Harlequins	42-6	Gloucester Rugby
	Report

Twickenham Stoop
Attendance: 10,526
Referee: Tim Wigglesworth

17 September 2011
15:00

London Wasps	18-29	Sale Sharks
	Report

Adams Park
Attendance: 5,078
Referee: Greg Garner

17 September 2011
15:00

Northampton Saints	13-14	London Irish
	Report

Franklin's Gardens
Attendance: 12,557
Referee: Martin Fox

17 September 2011
15:05

Newcastle Falcons	26-27	Leicester Tigers
	Report

Kingston Park
Attendance: 4,214

17 September 2011
17:30

Bath Rugby	23-19	Exeter Chiefs
	Report

Recreation Ground
Attendance: 10,827

18 September 2011
14:15

Saracens	18-6	Worcester Warriors
	Report

Vicarage Road
Attendance: 5,937
Referee: Llyr ApGeraint-Roberts

=== Round 4 ===
23 September 2011
19:45

Sale Sharks	29-21	Northampton Saints
	Report

Edgeley Park
Attendance: 6,250
Referee: Tim Wigglesworth

24 September 2011
14:30

Leicester Tigers	25-50	Saracens
	Report

Welford Road
Attendance: 17,557
Referee: Greg Garner

24 September 2011
15:00

Gloucester Rugby	23-6	Bath Rugby
	Report

Kingsholm
Attendance: 14,736

24 September 2011
15:00

London Irish	46-29	Newcastle Falcons
	Report

Madejski Stadium
Attendance: 6,333

24 September 2011
15:00

Worcester Warriors	15-17	Harlequins
	Report

Sixways
Attendance: 7,965
Referee: Chris White

25 September 2011
15:00

Exeter Chiefs	21-11	London Wasps
	Report

Sandy Park
Attendance: 6,795
Referee: Martin Fox

=== Round 5 ===
30 September 2011
19:45

Worcester Warriors	12-3	Northampton Saints
	Report

Sixways
Attendance: 9,248

1 October 2011
13:00

Gloucester Rugby	33-30	London Irish
	Report

Kingsholm
Attendance: 10,864
Referee: Greg Garner

1 October 2011
15:00

Exeter Chiefs	13-17	Saracens
	Report

Sandy Park
Attendance: 6,795

1 October 2011
15:00

Harlequins	48-41	Sale Sharks
	Report

Twickenham Stoop
Attendance: 10,802
Referee: Martin Fox

1 October 2011
15:15

Bath Rugby	26-25	Leicester Tigers
	Report

Recreation Ground
Attendance: 11,768
Referee: Tim Wigglesworth

2 October 2011
15:30

Newcastle Falcons	15-10	London Wasps
	Report

Kingston Park
Attendance: 4,052
Referee: Sean Davey

=== Round 6 ===
8 October 2011
14:30

Northampton Saints	33-3	Exeter Chiefs
	Report

Franklin's Gardens
Attendance: 12,542
Referee: Greg Garner

8 October 2011
15:00

Sale Sharks	13-11	Gloucester Rugby
	Report

Edgeley Park
Attendance: 8,088
Referee: Sean Davey

8 October 2011
16:45

Leicester Tigers	18-27	Harlequins
	Report

Welford Road
Attendance: 17,227

9 October 2011
14:00

London Irish	42-24	Worcester Warriors
	Report

Madejski Stadium
Attendance: 6,385

9 October 2011
15:00

London Wasps	27-24	Bath Rugby
	Report

Adams Park
Attendance: 6,835
Referee: Andrew Small

9 October 2011
15:00

Saracens	25-5	Newcastle Falcons
	Report

Vicarage Road
Attendance: 5,882

=== Round 7 ===
28 October 2011
19:45

Sale Sharks	13-34	Leicester Tigers
	Report

Edgeley Park
Attendance: 8,673
Referee: Andrew Small

28 October 2011
19:45

Worcester Warriors	12-14	London Wasps
	Report

Sixways
Attendance: 9,304
Referee: Greg Garner

29 October 2011
14:30

London Irish	12-13	Bath Rugby
	Report

Madejski Stadium
Attendance: 9,252

29 October 2011
15:00

Harlequins	19-13	Exeter Chiefs
	Report

Twickenham Stoop
Attendance: 12,395
Referee: Sean Davey

29 October 2011
15:00

Northampton Saints	44-15	Newcastle Falcons
	Report

Franklin's Gardens
Attendance: 13,326

29 October 2011
17:45

Gloucester Rugby	17-19	Saracens
	Report

Kingsholm
Attendance: 11,949
Referee: Tim Wigglesworth

=== Round 8 ===
4 November 2011
19:45

Newcastle Falcons	16-16	Worcester Warriors
	Report

Kingston Park
Attendance: 7,013
Referee: Wayne Barnes

5 November 2011
14:15

Bath Rugby	13-26	Harlequins
	Report

Recreation Ground
Attendance: 12,200
Referee: Dean Richards

5 November 2011
15:00

Exeter Chiefs	19-24	Gloucester Rugby
	Report

Sandy Park
Attendance: 9,607
Referee: Andrew Small

5 November 2011
15:05

Leicester Tigers	24-24	London Irish
	Report

Welford Road
Attendance: 20,479
Referee: Dave Pearson

6 November 2011
14:15

London Wasps	13-24	Northampton Saints
	Report

Adams Park
Attendance: 8,222
Referee: Tim Wigglesworth

6 November 2011
15:00

Saracens	23-10	Sale Sharks
	Report

Vicarage Road
Attendance: 6,012
Referee: Martin Fox

=== Round 9 ===
25 November 2011
19:45

Sale Sharks	23-30	Exeter Chiefs
	Report

Edgeley Park
Attendance: 6,877
Referee: Tim Wigglesworth

25 November 2011
19:45

Worcester Warriors	16-7	Bath Rugby
	Report

Sixways
Attendance: 10,694
Referee: Martin Fox

26 November 2011
14:15

Gloucester Rugby	14-19	Leicester Tigers
	Report

Kingsholm
Attendance: 14,437

26 November 2011
15:00

London Irish	21-17	London Wasps
	Report

Madejski Stadium
Attendance: 8,612
Referee: Sean Davey

26 November 2011
17:00

Northampton Saints	30-8	Saracens
	Report

Franklin's Gardens
Attendance: 13,402
Referee: Dave Pearson

27 November 2011
15:00

Harlequins	39-8	Newcastle Falcons
	Report

Twickenham Stoop
Attendance: 12,521

=== Round 10 ===
2 December 2011
20:00

Newcastle Falcons	26-25	Gloucester Rugby
	Report

Kingston Park
Attendance: 4,111
Referee: Greg Garner

3 December 2011
14:15

Bath Rugby	13-16	Sale Sharks
	Report

Recreation Ground
Attendance: 12,040

3 December 2011
14:15

Leicester Tigers	30-25	Northampton Saints
	Report

Welford Road
Attendance: 24,000
Referee: Wayne Barnes

3 December 2011
15:00

Exeter Chiefs	15-9	Worcester Warriors
	Report

Sandy Park
Attendance: 7,337

4 December 2011
14:00

Saracens	15-11	London Irish
	Report

Vicarage Road
Attendance: 6,240
Referee: Andrew Small

4 December 2011
16:00

London Wasps	16-22	Harlequins
	Report

Adams Park
Attendance: 6,792
Referee: Dean Richards

=== Round 11 ===
24 December 2011
15:15

Northampton Saints	22-13	Bath Rugby
	Report

Franklin's Gardens
Attendance: 13,475

26 December 2011
14:30

Sale Sharks	27-19	Newcastle Falcons
	Report

Edgeley Park
Attendance: 9,045
Referee: Dave Pearson

26 December 2011
15:00

Gloucester Rugby	39-10	London Wasps
	Report

Kingsholm
Attendance: 16,121
Referee: Greg Garner

27 December 2011
13:30

London Irish	29-22	Exeter Chiefs
	Report

Madejski Stadium
Attendance: 13,474
Referee: Dean Richards

27 December 2011
14:00

Worcester Warriors	13-32	Leicester Tigers
	Report

Sixways
Attendance: 12,024

27 December 2011
16:30

Harlequins	11-19	Saracens
	Report

Twickenham
Attendance: 82,000
Referee: Wayne Barnes

=== Round 12 ===
31 December 2011
14:00

Newcastle Falcons	14-32	Northampton Saints
	Report

Kingston Park
Attendance: 6,017
Referee: Tim Wigglesworth

31 December 2011
15:45

Exeter Chiefs	9-11	Harlequins
	Report

Sandy Park
Attendance: 10,602

1 January 2012
13:30

Bath Rugby	30-3	London Irish
	Report

Recreation Ground
Attendance: 12,200
Referee: Martin Fox

1 January 2012
15:00

London Wasps	0-6	Worcester Warriors
	Report

Adams Park
Attendance: 6,932
Referee: Wayne Barnes

1 January 2012
15:00

Saracens	15-15	Gloucester Rugby
	Report

Vicarage Road
Attendance: 7,555
Referee: Sean Davey

1 January 2012
15:30

Leicester Tigers	28-23	Sale Sharks
	Report

Welford Road
Attendance: 23,132
Referee: Andrew Small

=== Round 13 ===
6 January 2012
19:45

Northampton Saints	24-3	Harlequins
	Report

Franklin's Gardens
Attendance: 13,459
Referee: Dave Pearson

7 January 2012
14:45

Worcester Warriors	21-15	Gloucester Rugby
	Report

Sixways
Attendance: 12,024
Referee: Martin Fox

7 January 2012
15:00

Newcastle Falcons	10-16	Exeter Chiefs
	Report

Kingston Park
Attendance: 3,445
Referee: Andrew Small

7 January 2012
17:00

Leicester Tigers	19-11	London Wasps
	Report

Welford Road
Attendance: 21,310
Referee: Tim Wigglesworth

8 January 2012
15:00

London Irish	21-19	Sale Sharks
	Report

Madejski Stadium
Attendance: 8,088
Referee: Wayne Barnes

8 January 2012
15:00

Saracens	26-19	Bath Rugby
	Report

Vicarage Road
Attendance: 5,799

=== Round 14 ===
10 February 2012
20:00

Sale Sharks	15-12	Worcester Warriors
	Report

Edgeley Park
Attendance: 5,926
Referee: Llyr ApGeraint-Roberts

11 February 2012
14:00

Harlequins	30-23	London Irish
	Report

Twickenham Stoop
Attendance: 13,418
Referee: Tim Wigglesworth

11 February 2012
14:15

Bath Rugby	30-24	Newcastle Falcons
	Report

Recreation Ground
Attendance: 11,944
Referee: Dean Richards

11 February 2012
14:15

Gloucester Rugby	27-24	Northampton Saints
	Report

Kingsholm
Attendance: 12,758

11 February 2012
18:00

Exeter Chiefs	19-11	Leicester Tigers
	Report

Sandy Park
Attendance: 9,025
Referee: Sean Davey

12 February 2012
13:15

London Wasps	17-22	Saracens
	Report

Adams Park
Attendance: 5,574
Referee: Greg Garner

=== Round 15 ===
18 February 2012
14:30

Bath Rugby	11-14	Gloucester Rugby
	Report

Recreation Ground
Attendance: 12,200
Referee: Wayne Barnes

18 February 2012
15:00

London Wasps	12-15	Exeter Chiefs
	Report

Adams Park
Attendance: 5,183
Referee: Dave Pearson

18 February 2012
15:00

Newcastle Falcons	19-10	London Irish
	Report

Kingston Park
Attendance: 5,813

18 February 2012
15:00

Northampton Saints	24-17	Sale Sharks
	Report

Franklin's Gardens
Attendance: 13,344
Referee: Greg Garner

18 February 2012
17:30

Harlequins	16-14	Worcester Warriors
	Report

Twickenham Stoop
Attendance: 12,416

19 February 2012
14:30

Saracens	19-20	Leicester Tigers
	Report

Vicarage Road
Attendance: 7,265
Referee: Andrew Small

=== Round 16 ===
24 February 2012
19:45

Sale Sharks	46-34	London Wasps
	Report

Edgeley Park
Attendance: 7,829
Referee: Sean Davey

24 February 2012
19:45

Worcester Warriors	16-11	Saracens
	Report

Sixways
Attendance: 10,101

25 February 2012
15:00

Leicester Tigers	42-15	Newcastle Falcons
	Report

Welford Road
Attendance: 18,759
Referee: Greg Garner

25 February 2012
18:00

Exeter Chiefs	9-12	Bath Rugby
	Report

Sandy Park
Attendance: 9,151

25 February 2012
18:00

Gloucester Rugby	29-23	Harlequins
	Report

Kingsholm
Attendance: 13,559
Referee: Dave Pearson

26 February 2012
13:15

London Irish	23-30	Northampton Saints
	Report

Madejski Stadium
Attendance: 10,172
Referee: Andrew Small

=== Round 17 ===
2 March 2012
19:45

Newcastle Falcons	9-9	Harlequins
	Report

Kingston Park
Attendance: 10,172
Referee: Andrew Small

3 March 2012
14:15

Bath Rugby	36-17	Worcester Warriors
	Report

Recreation Ground
Attendance: 12,200
Referee: Greg Garner

3 March 2012
15:00

Exeter Chiefs	37-12	Sale Sharks
	Report

Sandy Park
Attendance: 7,108
Referee: Dean Richards

3 March 2012
15:00

London Wasps	18-13	London Irish
	Report

Adams Park
Attendance: 7,136
Referee: Martin Fox

4 March 2012
13:00

Leicester Tigers	36-3	Gloucester Rugby
	Report

Welford Road
Attendance: 21,699
Referee: Tim Wigglesworth

4 March 2012
17:00

Saracens	18-12	Northampton Saints
	Report

Vicarage Road
Attendance: 6,044

=== Round 18 ===
23 March 2012
19:45

Sale Sharks	9-45	Saracens
	Report

Edgeley Park
Attendance: 9,476
Referee: Andrew Small

23 March 2012
19:45

Worcester Warriors	19-9	Newcastle Falcons
	Report

Sixways
Attendance: 11,192

24 March 2012
14:15

Harlequins	14-6	Bath Rugby
	Report

Twickenham Stoop
Attendance: 14,282
Referee: Wayne Barnes

24 March 2012
15:00

Gloucester Rugby	27-28	Exeter Chiefs
	Report

Kingsholm
Attendance: 15,063
Referee: Greg Garner

24 March 2012
17:45

Northampton Saints	32-15	London Wasps
	Report

Franklin's Gardens
Attendance: 13,469
Referee: Tim Wigglesworth

25 March 2012
15:00

London Irish	32-41	Leicester Tigers
	Report

Madejski Stadium
Attendance: 20,905
Referee: Dean Richards

=== Round 19 ===
30 March 2012
19:45

Leicester Tigers	43-13	Worcester Warriors
	Report

Welford Road
Attendance: 21,344
Referee: Wayne Barnes

30 March 2012
19:45

Newcastle Falcons	22-19	Sale Sharks
	Report

Kingston Park
Attendance: 5,200

31 March 2012
15:00

Exeter Chiefs	18-11	London Irish
	Report

Sandy Park
Attendance: 8,977
Referee: Dave Pearson

31 March 2012
15:00

Saracens	19-24	Harlequins
	Report

Wembley Stadium
Attendance: 83,761
Referee: Greg Garner

31 March 2012
17:30

Bath Rugby	6-26	Northampton Saints
	Report

Recreation Ground
Attendance: 12,200
Referee: Martin Fox

1 April 2012
15:00

London Wasps	26-24	Gloucester Rugby
	Report

Adams Park
Attendance: 6,849

=== Round 20 ===
13 April 2012
19:45

Sale Sharks	16-9	Bath Rugby
	Report

Edgeley Park
Attendance: 8,043
Referee: Greg Garner

14 April 2012
14:15

Northampton Saints	21-35	Leicester Tigers
	Report

Franklin's Gardens
Attendance: 13,475
Referee: Dave Pearson

14 April 2012
15:00

Gloucester Rugby	20-29	Newcastle Falcons
	Report

Kingsholm
Attendance: 12,950
Referee: Tim Wigglesworth

14 April 2012
15:00

London Irish	19-28	Saracens
	Report

Madejski Stadium
Attendance: 9,473
Referee: Martin Fox

14 April 2012
15:00

Worcester Warriors	26-31	Exeter Chiefs
	Report

Sixways
Attendance: 10,477
Referee: Dean Richards

14 April 2012
16:30

Harlequins	33-17	London Wasps
	Report

Twickenham Stoop
Attendance: 14,282

=== Round 21 ===
20 April 2012
19:45

Newcastle Falcons	3-9	Saracens
	Report

Kingston Park
Attendance: 8,013

21 April 2012
14:15

Bath Rugby	17-12	London Wasps
	Report

Recreation Ground
Attendance: 12,200
Referee: Dave Pearson

21 April 2012
15:00

Gloucester Rugby	19-24	Sale Sharks
	Report

Kingsholm
Attendance: 14,491

21 April 2012
15:00

Worcester Warriors	16-25	London Irish
	Report

Sixways
Attendance: 10,619
Referee: Tim Wigglesworth

21 April 2012
15:15

Harlequins	33-43	Leicester Tigers
	Report

Twickenham Stoop
Attendance: 14,282
Referee: Wayne Barnes

22 April 2012
14:00

Exeter Chiefs	15-18	Northampton Saints
	Report

Sandy Park
Attendance: 10,744
Referee: Andrew Small

=== Round 22 ===
5 May 2012
14:00

Leicester Tigers	28-3	Bath Rugby
	Report

Welford Road
Attendance: 24,000
Referee: Dean Richards

5 May 2012
14:00

London Irish	52-18	Gloucester Rugby
	Report

Madejski Stadium
Attendance: 9,610
Referee: Dave Pearson

5 May 2012
14:00

London Wasps	10-14	Newcastle Falcons
	Report

Adams Park
Attendance: 10,516
Referee: Wayne Barnes

5 May 2012
14:00

Northampton Saints	42-14	Worcester Warriors
	Report

Franklin's Gardens
Attendance: 13,475
Referee: Greg Garner

5 May 2012
14:00

Sale Sharks	10-24	Harlequins
	Report

Edgeley Park
Attendance: 10,149
Referee: Martin Fox

5 May 2012
14:00

Saracens	40-22	Exeter Chiefs
	Report

Vicarage Road
Attendance: 6,346
Referee: Tim Wigglesworth

== Play-offs ==
As in previous seasons, the top four teams in the Premiership table, following the conclusion of the regular season, contest the play-off semi-finals in a 1st vs 4th and 2nd vs 3rd format, with the higher ranking team having home advantage. The two winners of the semi-finals then meet in the Premiership Final at Twickenham on 26 May 2012.

=== Bracket ===
Semi-finals
1	Harlequins	25
4	Northampton Saints	23
2	Leicester Tigers	24
3	Saracens	15

Final
1	Harlequins	30
2	Leicester Tigers	23

=== Semi-finals ===
12 May 2012
14:45

Harlequins	25 – 23	Northampton Saints

Twickenham Stoop, London
Attendance: 12,192
Referee: Andrew Small (England)

Team details

FB	15	(England) Mike Brown
RW	14	(England) Tom Williams
OC	13	(England) George Lowe
IC	12	(England) Jordan Turner-Hall
LW	11	(England) Sam Smith
FH	10	(New Zealand) Nick Evans
SH	9	(England) Karl Dickson
N8	8	(England) Nick Easter
OF	7	(England) Chris Robshaw (c)
BF	6	(Samoa) Maurie Fa'asavalu
RL	5	(England) George Robson
LL	4	(England) Ollie Kohn
TP	3	(Samoa) James Johnston
HK	2	(England) Joe Gray
LP	1	(England) Joe Marler
Replacements:
HK	16	(England) Rob Buchanan
PR	17	(England) Mark Lambert
PR	18	(England) Will Collier
LK	19	(Argentina) Tomás Vallejos
N8	20	(England) Tom Guest
SH	21	(England) Richard Bolt
FH	22	(England) Rory Clegg
CE	23	(England) Matt Hopper
	Coach: (Ireland) Conor O'Shea

FB	15	(England) Ben Foden
RW	14	(England) Chris Ashton
OC	13	(Samoa) George Pisi
IC	12	(Ireland) James Downey
LW	11	(England) Paul Diggin
FH	10	(England) Ryan Lamb
SH	9	(England) Lee Dickson (c)
N8	8	(Ireland) Roger Wilson
OF	7	(England) Phil Dowson
BF	6	(England) James Craig
RL	5	(England) Christian Day
LL	4	(New Zealand) Mark Sorenson
TP	3	(South Africa) Brian Mujati
HK	2	(England) Andy Long
LP	1	(Tonga) Soane Tongaʻuiha
Replacements:
HK	16	(England) Ross McMillan
PR	17	(England) Alex Waller
PR	18	(England) Paul Doran-Jones
FL	19	(England) Ben Nutley
FL	20	(England) Teimana Harrison
SH	21	(Wales) Martin Roberts
FH	22	(England) Stephen Myler
CE	23	(England) Tom May
Coach: (England) Jim Mallinder

12 May 2012
17:30

Leicester Tigers	24 – 15	Saracens
	"Report 1".

Welford Road, Leicester
Attendance: 20,173
Referee: Dave Pearson (England)

Team details

FB	15	(Ireland) Geordan Murphy (c)
RW	14	(Argentina) Horacio Agulla
OC	13	(England) Manu Tuilagi
IC	12	(England) Anthony Allen
LW	11	(Samoa) Alesana Tuilagi
FH	10	(England) George Ford
SH	9	(England) Ben Youngs
N8	8	(England) Thomas Waldrom
OF	7	(Australia) Julian Salvi
BF	6	(Tonga) Steve Mafi
RL	5	(England) Geoff Parling
LL	4	(England) George Skivington
TP	3	(England) Dan Cole
HK	2	(England) George Chuter
LP	1	(Argentina) Marcos Ayerza
Replacements:
HK	16	(England) Tom Youngs
PR	17	(Samoa) Logovi'i Mulipola
PR	18	(Italy) Martin Castrogiovanni
LK	19	(England) Graham Kitchener
FL	20	(New Zealand) Craig Newby
SH	21	(England) Sam Harrison
FH	22	(England) Billy Twelvetrees
WG	23	(New Zealand) Scott Hamilton
	Coach: (England) Richard Cockerill

FB	15	(England) Alex Goode
RW	14	(England) David Strettle
OC	13	(England) Owen Farrell
IC	12	(England) Brad Barritt
LW	11	(United States) Chris Wyles
FH	10	(England) Charlie Hodgson
SH	9	(South Africa) Neil de Kock
N8	8	(South Africa) Ernst Joubert
OF	7	(England) Will Fraser
BF	6	(England) Jackson Wray
RL	5	(England) Mouritz Botha
LL	4	(England) Steve Borthwick (c)
TP	3	(England) Matt Stevens
HK	2	(South Africa) Schalk Brits
LP	1	(Wales) Rhys Gill
Replacements:
HK	16	(England) Jamie George
PR	17	(South Africa) John Smit
PR	18	(Italy) Carlos Nieto
LK	19	(England) Hugh Vyvyan
LK	20	(England) George Kruis
SH	21	(England) Richard Wigglesworth
CE	22	(England) Adam Powell
WG	23	(England) James Short
Coach: (Ireland) Mark McCall

=== Final ===
26 May 2012
15:00

Harlequins	30 – 23	Leicester Tigers
Try: Williams 9', Robshaw 56'; Con: Evans (1/2); Pen: Evans (6/7) 1', 22', 38', 44', 67', 55'	Report 1 Report 2	Try: Mafi 30' c, Allen 66' c Con: Ford (2/2); Pen: Ford (3/3) 14', 27', 69'

Twickenham, London
Attendance: 81,779
Referee: Wayne Barnes

Team details

Harlequins
Leicester Tigers

FB	15	(England) Mike Brown
RW	14	(England) Tom Williams
OC	13	(England) George Lowe
IC	12	(England) Jordan Turner-Hall
LW	11	(England) Ugo Monye
FH	10	(New Zealand) Nick Evans (substituted off) 76'
SH	9	(England) Danny Care
N8	8	(England) Nick Easter
OF	7	(England) Chris Robshaw (c)
BF	6	(Samoa) Maurie Fa'asavalu (substituted off) 72'
RL	5	(England) George Robson
LL	4	(England) Ollie Kohn
TP	3	(Samoa) James Johnston
HK	2	(England) Joe Gray
LP	1	(England) Joe Marler
Replacements:
HK	16	(England) Rob Buchanan
PR	17	(England) Mark Lambert
PR	18	(England) Will Collier
LK	19	(Argentina) Tomás Vallejos
N8	20	(England) Tom Guest (substituted in) 72'
SH	21	(England) Karl Dickson
FH	22	(England) Rory Clegg (substituted in) 76'
CE	23	(England) Matt Hopper
Coach:
(Ireland) Conor O'Shea

FB	15	(Ireland) Geordan Murphy (c)
RW	14	(Argentina) Horacio Agulla (substituted off) 73'
OC	13	(England) Manu Tuilagi
IC	12	(England) Anthony Allen
LW	11	(Samoa) Alesana Tuilagi
FH	10	(England) George Ford (substituted off) 73'
SH	9	(England) Ben Youngs
N8	8	(England) Thomas Waldrom (yellow card) 38
OF	7	(Australia) Julian Salvi
BF	6	(Tonga) Steve Mafi
RL	5	(England) Geoff Parling
LL	4	(England) George Skivington (substituted off) 73'
TP	3	(England) Dan Cole (substituted off) 55'
HK	2	(England) George Chuter (substituted off) 61'
LP	1	(Argentina) Marcos Ayerza (substituted off) 73'
Replacements:
HK	16	(England) Tom Youngs (substituted in) 61'
PR	17	(Samoa) Logovi'i Mulipola (substituted in) 73'
PR	18	(Italy) Martin Castrogiovanni (substituted in) 55'
LK	19	(England) Graham Kitchener (substituted in) 73'
FL	20	(New Zealand) Craig Newby
SH	21	(England) Sam Harrison
FH	22	(England) Billy Twelvetrees (substituted in) 73'
WG	23	(New Zealand) Scott Hamilton (substituted in) 73'
Coach:
(England) Richard Cockerill

== Leading scorers ==
Note: Flags indicate national union as has been defined under WR eligibility rules. Players may hold more than one non-WR nationality.

=== Most points ===
Rank	Player	Club	Points
1	(England) Tom Homer	London Irish	278
2	(New Zealand) Nick Evans	Harlequins	266
3	(Wales) Nick Macleod	Sale Sharks	231
4	(New Zealand) Jimmy Gopperth	Newcastle Falcons	221
5	(Argentina) Ignacio Mieres	Exeter Chiefs	211
6	(England) Toby Flood	Leicester Tigers	199
7	(England) Owen Farrell	Saracens	195
8	(England) Freddie Burns	Gloucester	193
9	(England) Ryan Lamb	Northampton Saints	184
10	(Wales) Nicky Robinson	London Wasps	162

=== Most tries ===
Rank	Player	Club	Tries
1	(England) Rob Miller	Sale Sharks	10
2	(England) Christian Wade	London Wasps	9
3	(Samoa) Alesana Tuilagi	Leicester Tigers	8
4	(England) Mike Brown	Harlequins	7
4	(England) Miles Benjamin	Worcester Warriors	7
4	(England) Charlie Sharples	Gloucester	7
7	10 players tied		6
