= 2009–10 Premiership Rugby =

Rugby union competition in England

2009–10 Guinness Premiership
- Countries: England
- Date: 4 September 2009 – 29 May 2010
- Champions: Leicester Tigers (9th title)
- Runners-up: Saracens
- Relegated: Worcester Warriors
- Matches played: 135
- Attendance: 1,900,177 (average 14,075 per match)
- Tries scored: 427 (average 3.2 per match)
- Top point scorer: Jimmy Gopperth (Newcastle) (219 points)
- Top try scorer: Chris Ashton (Northampton) (16 tries)

Official website
- www.premiershiprugby.com

The 2009–10 Guinness Premiership was the 23rd season of the top flight English domestic rugby union competition and the fifth and final one to be sponsored by Guinness. The reigning champions entering the season were Leicester Tigers, who had claimed their eighth title after defeating London Irish in the 2009 final. Leeds Carnegie had been promoted as champions from the 2008–09 National Division One at the first attempt.

== Summary ==
Leicester Tigers won their ninth title after defeating Saracens in the final at Twickenham having also topped the regular season table. Worcester Warriors were relegated on the last day of the season. It was the first time that Worcester have been relegated from the top flight since they first achieved promotion.

As usual, round 1 included the London Double Header at Twickenham, the sixth instance since its inception in 2004.

== Teams ==
Twelve teams compete in the league–the top eleven teams from the previous season and Leeds Carnege who were promoted from the 2008–09 National Division One after a top flight absence of one year. They replaced Bristol Bears who were relegated after four years in the top flight.

=== Stadiums and locations ===
2009–10 Guinness Premiership Teams

Club	Captain	Kit Supplier	Stadium	Capacity	City/Area
Bath	(South Africa) Michael Claassens	Puma	The Recreation Ground	11,700	Bath
Gloucester	(England) Mike Tindall (Wales) Gareth Delve	RugbyTech	Kingsholm	16,500	Gloucester
Harlequins	(England) Will Skinner	KooGa	Twickenham Stoop (Note: Harlequins will also play a home game at Twickenham Stadium on 27 December 2009)	14,282 (Note: Capacity at The Stoop up from 12,638 to 14,282 for the 2009–10 season.)	Twickenham, Greater London
Leeds Carnegie	(South Africa) Marco Wentzel	ISC	Headingley Stadium	22,250	Leeds
Leicester Tigers	(Ireland) Geordan Murphy	Cotton Traders	Welford Road	24,000	Leicester
London Irish	(Ireland) Bob Casey	RugbyTech	Madejski Stadium (Note: London Irish will also play a home game at Twickenham Stadium on 4 September 2010)	24,161	Reading
London Wasps	(England) Tom Rees	Canterbury	Adams Park (Note: London Wasps will also play a home game at Twickenham Stadium on 5 September 2009 and 24 April 2010)	10,516	High Wycombe
Newcastle Falcons	(New Zealand) Carl Hayman	Cotton Traders	Kingston Park	10,200	Newcastle upon Tyne
Northampton Saints	(England) Dylan Hartley	Rhino Sportswear	Franklin's Gardens	13,591	Northampton
Sale Sharks	(England) Dean Schofield	Cotton Traders	Edgeley Park	10,852	Stockport, Greater Manchester
Saracens	(England) Steve Borthwick	KooGa	Vicarage Road (Note: Saracens will also play a home game at Twickenham Stadium on 5 September 2009 and 3 home games at Wembley Stadium on 12 September 2009, 13 February 2010 and 17 April 2010)	19,920	Watford
Worcester Warriors	(England) Pat Sanderson	Kukri	Sixways Stadium	12,068	Worcester

== Table ==
2009–10 Premiership Rugby Table
Pos	Team	Pld	W	D	L	PF	PA	PD	TF	TA	TB	LB	Pts	Qualification or relegation
1	Leicester Tigers (C)	22	15	1	6	541	325	+216	46	18	7	4	73	Play-off place, Berth in the 2010–11 Heineken Cup
2	Northampton Saints (SF)	22	16	0	6	472	322	+150	44	26	2	5	71	Play-off place, Berth in the 2010–11 Heineken Cup
3	Saracens (RU)	22	15	1	6	480	367	+113	39	22	2	5	69	Play-off place, Berth in the 2010–11 Heineken Cup
4	Bath (SF)	22	12	2	8	450	366	+84	49	33	5	4	61	Play-off place, Berth in the 2010–11 Heineken Cup
5	London Wasps	22	13	0	9	394	399	−5	35	31	2	3	57	Berth in the 2010–11 Heineken Cup
6	London Irish	22	10	3	9	469	384	+85	42	33	3	3	52	Berth in the 2010–11 Heineken Cup
7	Gloucester	22	10	1	11	470	457	+13	46	42	2	4	48	2010–11 European Challenge Cup
8	Harlequins	22	9	2	11	420	484	−64	42	46	3	3	46	2010–11 European Challenge Cup
9	Newcastle Falcons	22	6	4	12	319	431	−112	20	41	1	4	37	2010–11 European Challenge Cup
10	Leeds Carnegie	22	7	1	14	283	493	−210	17	48	0	6	36	2010–11 European Challenge Cup
11	Sale Sharks	22	6	1	15	333	495	−162	24	51	0	6	32	2010–11 European Challenge Cup
12	Worcester Warriors (Note: The champion of the Championship (Exeter Chiefs) are eligible for promotion.) (R)	22	3	4	15	312	420	−108	23	36	0	8	28	Relegated

Source: Premiership Rugby
Rules for classification: Tiebreakers for teams tied on points: 1) Number of matches won; 2) Difference between points for and against; 3) Total number of points for; 4) Aggregate number of points scored in matches between tied teams; 5) Number of matches won excluding the first match, then the second and so on until the tie is settled
(C) Champions; (RU) Runners-up; (SF) Losing semi-finalists; (R) Relegated

== Results ==
=== Round 1 ===
4 September 2009
19:45

Sale Sharks	15–12	Leicester Tigers

Edgeley Park
Attendance: 8,751

5 September 2009
14:30

Saracens	18–14	London Irish

Twickenham
Attendance: 67,684

5 September 2009
17:15

London Wasps	26–15	Harlequins

Twickenham
Attendance: 67,684

6 September 2009
13:15

Northampton Saints	20–17	Worcester Warriors

Franklin's Gardens
Attendance: 12,073

6 September 2009
15:00

Leeds Carnegie	9–9	Newcastle Falcons

Headingley
Attendance: 7,144

6 September 2009
15:30

Gloucester	24–5	Bath

Kingsholm
Attendance: 12,815

=== Round 2 ===
11 September 2009
20:00

Worcester Warriors	27–7	Leeds Carnegie

Sixways
Attendance: 10,094

12 September 2009
14:15

Bath	15–17	London Wasps

Recreation Ground
Attendance: 11,300

12 September 2009
14:45

Saracens	19–16	Northampton Saints

Wembley Stadium
Attendance: 44,832

12 September 2009
15:00

Harlequins	9–15	Leicester Tigers

Twickenham Stoop
Attendance: 9,805

13 September 2009
15:00

London Irish	40–10	Gloucester

Madejski Stadium
Attendance: 12,309

13 September 2009
15:00

Newcastle Falcons	16–16	Sale Sharks

Kingston Park
Attendance: 5,155

=== Round 3 ===
18 September 2009
19:45

Sale Sharks	12–25	Bath

Edgeley Park
Attendance: 7,028

19 September 2009
15:00

Gloucester	14–27	Northampton Saints

Kingsholm
Attendance: 11,365

19 September 2009
15:00

Harlequins	9–22	Saracens

Twickenham Stoop
Attendance: 9,209

19 September 2009
17:35

Leicester Tigers	15–6	Newcastle Falcons

Welford Road
Attendance: 24,000

20 September 2009
15:00

Leeds Carnegie	7–56	London Irish

Headingley
Attendance: 6,047

20 September 2009
15:00

London Wasps	23–3	Worcester Warriors

Adams Park
Attendance: 7,654

=== Round 4 ===
25 September 2009
20:00

Newcastle Falcons	17–17	Harlequins

Kingston Park
Attendance: 5,714

26 September 2009
15:00

Northampton Saints	30–10	Leeds Carnegie

Franklin's Gardens
Attendance: 12,441

26 September 2009
15:00

Worcester Warriors	24–18	Sale Sharks

Sixways
Attendance: 9,510

26 September 2009
18:05

Bath	20–20	Leicester Tigers

Recreation Ground
Attendance: 11,700

27 September 2009
15:00

London Irish	28–16	London Wasps

Madejski Stadium
Attendance: 13,967

27 September 2009
15:00

Saracens	19–16	Gloucester

Vicarage Road
Attendance: 7,776

=== Round 5 ===
2 October 2009
19:45

Sale Sharks	8–11	London Irish

Edgeley Park
Attendance: 6,924

3 October 2009
15:00

Leicester Tigers	19–14	Worcester Warriors

Welford Road
Attendance: 17,974

3 October 2009
18:05

Harlequins	13–11	Bath

Twickenham Stoop
Attendance: 11,203

4 October 2009
15:00

Leeds Carnegie	10–26	Gloucester

Headingley
Attendance: 5,371

4 October 2009
15:00

London Wasps	20–15	Northampton Saints

Adams Park
Attendance: 8,913

4 October 2009
15:00

Newcastle Falcons	15–22	Saracens

Kingston Park
Attendance: 5,453

=== Round 6 ===
24 October 2009
14:15

Bath	16–27	Newcastle Falcons

Recreation Ground
Attendance: 11,700

24 October 2009
15:00

Northampton Saints	21–16	Sale Sharks

Franklin's Gardens
Attendance: 13,055

24 October 2009
15:00

Worcester Warriors	22–26	Harlequins

Sixways
Attendance: 10,010

24 October 2009
15:15

London Irish	18–12	Leicester Tigers

Madejski Stadium
Attendance: 16,199

24 October 2009
17:35

Gloucester	6–35	London Wasps

Kingsholm
Attendance: 11,982

25 October 2009
15:00

Saracens	21–15	Leeds Carnegie

Vicarage Road
Attendance: 7,123

=== Round 7 ===
30 October 2009
19:45

Sale Sharks	28–23	Gloucester

Edgeley Park
Attendance: 7,222

31 October 2009
14:15

Bath	11–12	Saracens

Recreation Ground
Attendance: 11,700

31 October 2009
15:00

Harlequins	9–9	London Irish

Twickenham Stoop
Attendance: 14,282

31 October 2009
17:35

Leicester Tigers	29–15	Northampton Saints

Welford Road
Attendance: 23,641

1 November 2009
13:15

London Wasps	9–15	Leeds Carnegie

Adams Park
Attendance: 7,616

1 November 2009
15:00

Newcastle Falcons	14–3	Worcester Warriors

Kingston Park
Attendance: 4,924

=== Round 8 ===
20 November 2009
19:45

Gloucester	12–9	Leicester Tigers

Kingsholm
Attendance: 12,521

20 November 2009
20:00

Worcester Warriors	12–12	Bath

Sixways
Attendance: 10,194

21 November 2009
13:00

Northampton Saints	26–17	Harlequins

Franklin's Gardens
Attendance: 13,040

22 November 2009
15:00

Leeds Carnegie	17–24	Sale Sharks

Headingley
Attendance: 5,955

22 November 2009
15:00

London Irish	11–15	Newcastle Falcons

Madejski Stadium
Attendance: 9,425

22 November 2009
15:00

Saracens	22–6	London Wasps

Vicarage Road
Attendance: 9,786

=== Round 9 ===
27 November 2009
20:00

Newcastle Falcons	8–28	Northampton Saints

Kingston Park
Attendance: 6,522

27 November 2009
20:00

Worcester Warriors	12–12	Saracens

Sixways
Attendance: 10,027

28 November 2009
15:00

Harlequins	35–29	Gloucester

Twickenham Stoop
Attendance: 11,854

28 November 2009
15:00

Leicester Tigers	39–6	Leeds Carnegie

Welford Road
Attendance: 18,408

28 November 2009
17:35

Bath	0–16	London Irish

Recreation Ground
Attendance: 11,700

=== Round 10 ===
4 December 2009
19:30

Leeds Carnegie	27–30	Harlequins

Headingley
Attendance: 5,090

5 December 2009
15:00

Gloucester	25–13	Newcastle Falcons

Kingsholm
Attendance: 11,410

5 December 2009
15:00

London Irish	16–16	Worcester Warriors

Madejski Stadium
Attendance: 8,561

5 December 2009
15:00

Northampton Saints	15–13	Bath

Franklin's Gardens
Attendance: 13,101

5 December 2009
17:35

Saracens	15–13	Sale Sharks

Vicarage Road
Attendance: 7,101

6 December 2009
15:00

London Wasps	24–22	Leicester Tigers

Adams Park
Attendance: 10,116

=== Round 11 ===
26 December 2009
16:15

Worcester Warriors	6–26	Northampton Saints

Sixways
Attendance: 12,024

27 December 2009
14:00

Leicester Tigers	32–6	Sale Sharks

Welford Road
Attendance: 24,000

27 December 2009
14:15

Bath	24–8	Gloucester

Recreation Ground
Attendance: 11,700

27 December 2009
15:00

London Irish	23–19	Saracens

Madejski Stadium
Attendance: 19,734

27 December 2009
15:00

Newcastle Falcons	15–16	Leeds Carnegie

Kingston Park
Attendance: 8,766

27 December 2009
16:15

Harlequins	20–21	London Wasps

Twickenham
Attendance: 76,716

=== Round 12 ===
1 January 2010
17:30

Sale Sharks	21–16	Harlequins

Edgeley Park
Attendance: 8,172

2 January 2010
15:00

Gloucester	13–13	Worcester Warriors

Kingsholm
Attendance: 16,500

2 January 2010
15:00

Leeds Carnegie	15–20	Bath

Headingley
Attendance: 7,593

2 January 2010
15:00

Northampton Saints	24–22	London Irish

Franklin's Gardens
Attendance: 13,457

2 January 2010
15:00

Saracens	15–22	Leicester Tigers

Vicarage Road
Attendance: 14,013

3 January 2010
16:30

London Wasps	6–12	Newcastle Falcons

Adams Park
Attendance: 8,416

=== Round 13 ===
9 January 2010
15:15

Leicester Tigers	34–8	London Wasps

Welford Road
Attendance: 24,000

=== Round 14 ===
13 February 2010
15:00

Gloucester	46–6	Harlequins

Kingsholm
Attendance: 11,125

13 February 2010
15:00

Northampton Saints	25–13	Newcastle Falcons

Franklin's Gardens
Attendance: 13,189

13 February 2010
15:00

Saracens	25–20	Worcester Warriors

Wembley Stadium
Attendance: 40,163

14 February 2010
15:00

Leeds Carnegie	9–14	Leicester Tigers

Headingley
Attendance: 5,265

14 February 2010
16:30

London Irish	22–35	Bath

Madejski Stadium
Attendance: 10,033

14 February 2010
16:30

London Wasps	22–16	Sale Sharks

Adams Park
Attendance: 7,173

=== Round 15 ===
19 February 2010
19:45

Sale Sharks	10–19	Leeds Carnegie

Edgeley Park
Attendance: 7,426

20 February 2010
14:15

Bath	37–13	Worcester Warriors

Recreation Ground
Attendance: 11,700

20 February 2010
15:00

Harlequins	13–6	Northampton Saints

Twickenham Stoop
Attendance: 12,935

20 February 2010
15:00

Leicester Tigers	33–11	Gloucester

Welford Road
Attendance: 22,320

20 February 2010
17:30

Newcastle Falcons	12–12	London Irish

Kingston Park
Attendance: 5,168

21 February 2010
15:00

London Wasps	9–0	Saracens

Adams Park
Attendance: 8,530

=== Round 16 ===
26 February 2010
20:00

Worcester Warriors	13–0	Newcastle Falcons

Sixways
Attendance: 10,255

27 February 2010
15:00

Gloucester	47–3	Sale Sharks

Kingsholm
Attendance: 10,548

27 February 2010
18:00

Northampton Saints	19–3	Leicester Tigers

Franklin's Gardens
Attendance: 13,538

28 February 2010
14:00

Leeds Carnegie	26–10	London Wasps

Headingley
Attendance: 4,135

28 February 2010
15:00

London Irish	29–14	Harlequins

Madejski Stadium
Attendance: 12,373

28 February 2010
15:00

Saracens	14–16	Bath

Vicarage Road
Attendance: 8,864

=== Round 17 ===
6 March 2010
15:00

Harlequins	14–11	Worcester Warriors

Twickenham Stoop
Attendance: 11,274

6 March 2010
17:35

Leicester Tigers	35–19	London Irish

Welford Road
Attendance: 23,314

7 March 2010
14:30

Sale Sharks	7–15	Northampton Saints

Edgeley Park
Attendance: 7,109

7 March 2010
15:00

Leeds Carnegie	19–12	Saracens

Headingley
Attendance: 4,031

7 March 2010
15:00

London Wasps	24–19	Gloucester

Adams Park
Attendance: 8,541

7 March 2010
15:00

Newcastle Falcons	13–17	Bath

Kingston Park
Attendance: 7,745

=== Rearranged fixture ===
19 March 2010
19:45

Sale Sharks	19–8	London Wasps

Edgeley Park
Attendance: 7,493

=== Round 18 ===
27 March 2010
14:15

Bath	24–13	Harlequins

Recreation Ground
Attendance: 11,700

27 March 2010
15:00

Gloucester	19–0	Leeds Carnegie

Kingsholm
Attendance: 11,751

27 March 2010
15:00

Worcester Warriors	18–39	Leicester Tigers

Sixways
Attendance: 11,530

27 March 2010
17:30

Northampton Saints	14–9	London Wasps

Franklin's Gardens
Attendance: 13,451

28 March 2010
15:00

London Irish	38–0	Sale Sharks

Madejski Stadium
Attendance: 21,535

28 March 2010
15:00

Saracens	58–15	Newcastle Falcons

Vicarage Road
Attendance: 8,565

=== Rearranged fixture ===
31 March 2010
20:00

Newcastle Falcons	25–13	Gloucester

Kingston Park
Attendance: 4,275

=== Round 19 ===
2 April 2010
19:45

Sale Sharks	17–3	Worcester Warriors

Edgeley Park
Attendance: 7,291

3 April 2010
15:00

Harlequins	23–14	Newcastle Falcons

Twickenham Stoop
Attendance: 10,391

3 April 2010
15:00

Leeds Carnegie	7–14	Northampton Saints

Headingley
Attendance: 5,724

3 April 2010
15:00

Leicester Tigers	43–20	Bath

Welford Road
Attendance: 22,811

3 April 2010
17:30

Gloucester	29–28	Saracens

Kingsholm
Attendance: 13,338

4 April 2010
13:30

London Wasps	33–22	London Irish

Adams Park
Attendance: 9,924

=== Rearranged fixtures ===
9 April 2010
19:45

Sale Sharks	19–30	Saracens

Edgeley Park
Attendance: 6,952

10 April 2010
14:00

Harlequins	46–11	Leeds Carnegie

Twickenham Stoop
Attendance: 10,237

10 April 2010
15:00

Worcester Warriors	13–23	London Irish

Sixways
Attendance: 9,841

=== Round 20 ===
17 April 2010
14:15

Bath	34–15	Sale Sharks

Recreation Ground
Attendance: 11,700

17 April 2010
15:00

Northampton Saints	38–23	Gloucester

Franklin's Gardens
Attendance: 13,460

17 April 2010
15:00

Worcester Warriors	20–24	London Wasps

Sixways
Attendance: 10,428

17 April 2010
17:30

Saracens	37–18	Harlequins

Wembley Stadium
Attendance: 47,106

18 April 2010
15:00

London Irish	13–23	Leeds Carnegie

Madejski Stadium
Attendance: 8,898

18 April 2010
15:00

Newcastle Falcons	7–31	Leicester Tigers

Kingston Park
Attendance: 6,825

=== Rearranged fixture ===
20 April 2010
20:00

Bath	21–20	Northampton Saints

Recreation Ground
Attendance: 11,615

=== Round 21 ===
23 April 2010
19:45

Sale Sharks	30–32	Newcastle Falcons

Edgeley Park
Attendance: 9,336

24 April 2010
15:00

Gloucester	34–20	London Irish

Kingsholm
Attendance: 15,090

24 April 2010
15:00

Leicester Tigers	40–22	Harlequins

Welford Road
Attendance: 22,604

24 April 2010
15:00

Northampton Saints	27–28	Saracens

Franklin's Gardens
Attendance: 13,541

24 April 2010
17:30

London Wasps	19–35	Bath

Twickenham
Attendance: 60,208

25 April 2010
15:00

Leeds Carnegie	12–10	Worcester Warriors

Headingley
Attendance: 10,146

=== Round 22 ===
8 May 2010
15:00

Bath	39–3	Leeds Carnegie

Recreation Ground
Attendance: 11,700

8 May 2010
15:00

Harlequins	35–20	Sale Sharks

Twickenham Stoop
Attendance: 12,795

8 May 2010
15:00

Leicester Tigers	23–32	Saracens

Welford Road
Attendance: 24,000

8 May 2010
15:00

London Irish	7–31	Northampton Saints

Madejski Stadium
Attendance: 14,300

8 May 2010
15:00

Newcastle Falcons	21–25	London Wasps

Kingston Park
Attendance: 6,412

8 May 2010
15:00

Worcester Warriors	22–23	Gloucester

Sixways
Attendance: 12,024

== Play-offs ==
As in previous seasons, the top four teams in the Premiership table, following the conclusion of the regular season, contest the play-off semi-finals in a 1st vs 4th and 2nd vs 3rd format, with the higher ranking team having home advantage. The two winners of the semi-finals then meet in the Premiership Final at Twickenham on 29 May 2010.

=== Bracket ===
Semi-finals
1	Northampton Saints	19
4	Saracens	21
2	Leicester Tigers	15
3	Bath	6

Final
4	Saracens	27
2	Leicester Tigers	33

=== Semi-finals ===
16 May 2010
13:30

Northampton Saints	19–21	Saracens
Try: Tongaʻuiha 40' m, Mujati 56' m Pen: Myler (3/3) 6', 41', 51'	Report	Try: Goode 15' c, Wyles 47' c, Brits 76' c Con: Jackson (3/3)

Franklin's Gardens, Northampton
Attendance: 13,541
Referee: Wayne Barnes

16 May 2010
16:00

Leicester Tigers	15–6	Bath
Pen: Flood (5/6) 22', 36', 59', 63', 72'	Report	Pen: Barkley (2/4) 11', 20'

Welford Road, Leicester
Attendance: 21,575
Referee: Chris White

=== Final ===
29 May 2010
17:30

Leicester Tigers	33–27	Saracens
Try: Smith 13' c Youngs 27' c Hipkiss 76' c Con: Flood (3/3); Pen: Flood (4/6) 3', 19', 47', 57'	Report 1 Report 2	Try: Joubert (2) 17' m, 49' c Con: Jackson (1/2); Pen: Jackson (5/6) 2', 9', 25', 70', 75'

Twickenham Stadium, London
Attendance: 81,600
Referee: Dave Pearson

Team details

Leicester Tigers
Saracens

FB	15	(Ireland) Geordan Murphy (c)
RW	14	(New Zealand) Scott Hamilton
OC	13	(England) Matt Smith	(substituted off) 72'
IC	12	(England) Anthony Allen
LW	11	(Samoa) Alesana Tuilagi	(substituted off) 73'
FH	10	(England) Toby Flood
SH	9	(England) Ben Youngs
N8	8	(England) Jordan Crane
OF	7	(England) Lewis Moody	(substituted off) 67'
BF	6	(England) Tom Croft
RL	5	(England) Geoff Parling
LL	4	(England) Louis Deacon
TP	3	(Italy) Martin Castrogiovanni	(substituted off) 51'
HK	2	(England) George Chuter
LP	1	(Argentina) Marcos Ayerza	(substituted off) 52' (substituted on) 61'
Replacements:
HK	16	(New Zealand) Joe Duffey
PR	17	(England) Boris Stankovich	(substituted on) 52' (substituted off) 61'
PR	18	(England) Dan Cole	(substituted on) 51'
FL	19	(New Zealand) Craig Newby	(substituted on) 67'
FL	20	(England) Ben Woods
SH	21	(England) James Grindal
FH	22	(Ireland) Jeremy Staunton	(substituted on) 73'
CE	23	(England) Dan Hipkiss	(substituted on) 72'
Coach:
(England) Richard Cockerill

FB	15	(England) Alex Goode
RW	14	(Fiji) Michael Tagicakibau	(substituted off) 58'
OC	13	(England) Adam Powell
IC	12	(England) Brad Barritt
LW	11	(United States) Chris Wyles
FH	10	(New Zealand) Glen Jackson
SH	9	(South Africa) Neil de Kock	(substituted off) 64'
N8	8	(South Africa) Ernst Joubert
OF	7	(England) Andy Saull	(substituted off) 64'
BF	6	(Namibia) Jacques Burger
RL	5	(England) Hugh Vyvyan
LL	4	(England) Steve Borthwick (c)	(substituted off) 44'
TP	3	(South Africa) Petrus du Plessis
HK	2	(South Africa) Schalk Brits
LP	1	(Italy) Matías Agüero	(substituted off) 51'
Replacements:
HK	16	(Italy) Fabio Ongaro
PR	17	(Wales) Rhys Gill	(substituted on) 51'
PR	18	(England) Richard Skuse
LK	19	(South Africa) Mouritz Botha	(substituted on) 44'
FL	20	(South Africa) Justin Melck	(substituted on) 64'
SH	21	(New Zealand) Justin Marshall	(substituted on) 64'
CE	22	(South Africa) Derick Hougaard
WG	23	(Fiji) Kameli Ratuvou	(substituted on) 58'
Coach:
(South Africa) Brendan Venter

== Leading scorers ==
Note: Flags indicate national union as has been defined under WR eligibility rules. Players may hold more than one non-WR nationality.

=== Most points ===
Rank	Player	Club	Points
1	(New Zealand) Jimmy Gopperth	Newcastle Falcons	219
2	(England) Toby Flood	Leicester Tigers	216
3	(Wales) Nicky Robinson	Gloucester	198
4	(New Zealand) Willie Walker	Worcester Warriors	187
5	(New Zealand) Glen Jackson	Saracens	178
6	(New Zealand) Nick Evans	Harlequins	175
7	(England) Charlie Hodgson	Sale Sharks	149
7	(Wales) Ceiron Thomas	Leeds Tykes	149
9	(England) Stephen Myler	Northampton Saints	145
10	(England) Ryan Lamb	London Irish	143

=== Most tries ===
Rank	Player	Club	Tries
1	(England) Chris Ashton	Northampton Saints	16
2	(New Zealand) Joe Maddock	Bath	11
3	(England) Matt Banahan	Bath	10
4	(England) Steffon Armitage	London Irish	8
4	(England) James Simpson-Daniel	Gloucester	8
6	(South Africa) Schalk Brits	Northampton Saints	7
6	(England) George Lowe	Harlequins	7
6	(England) Charlie Sharples	Gloucester	7
9	(England) Jon Clarke	Northampton Saints	6
9	(South Africa) Ernst Joubert	Saracens	6
9	(Samoa) Sailosi Tagicakibau	London Irish	6
9	(England) Tom Varndell	London Wasps	6
