= Joe Marler =

British & Irish Lions & England international rugby union player

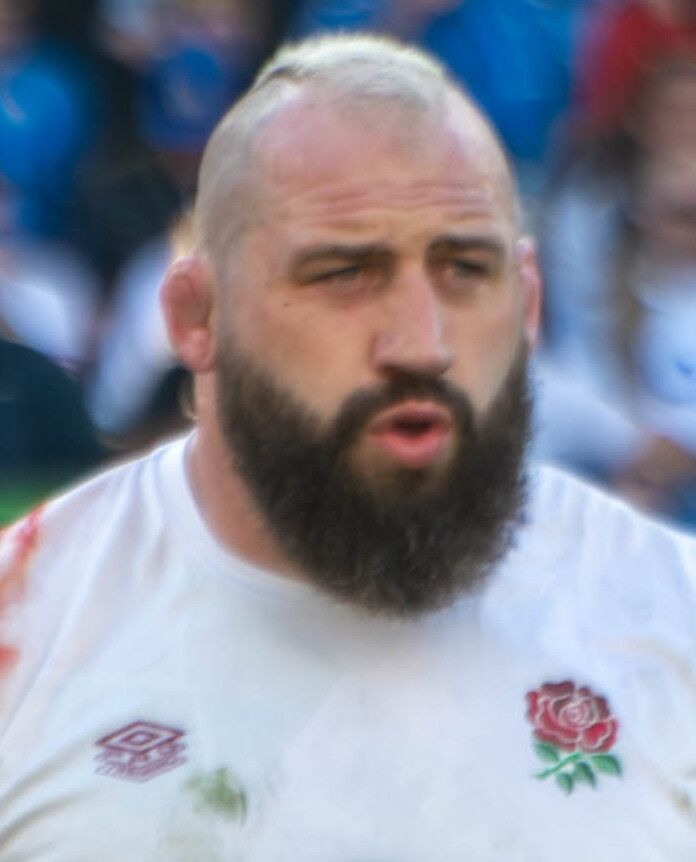
- Marler with England in 2024
- Full name: Joseph William Marler
- Born: 7 July 1990 (age 36) Eastbourne, East Sussex, England
- Height: 184 cm (6 ft 0 in)
- Weight: 128 kg (282 lb)
- School: Heathfield Community College

Rugby union career
- Position: Prop
Senior career
| Years | Team | Apps | (Points) |
| 2009–2024 | Harlequins | 286 | (55) |
International career
| Years | Team | Apps | (Points) |
| 2009–2010 | England U20 | 13 | (15) |
| 2011 | England Saxons | 2 | (0) |
| 2012–2024 | England | 95 | (0) |
| 2017 | British & Irish Lions | 0 | (-) |
| 2019–2022 | Barbarians | 2 | (0) |
Medal record
Men's Rugby union
Representing England
Rugby World Cup
| Silver medal – second place | 2019 Japan | Squad |
| Bronze medal – third place | 2023 France | Squad |

Joseph William George Marler (born 7 July 1990) is an English former rugby union player who played as a prop for Premiership Rugby club Harlequins. He played for the England national team until his retirement in November 2024. Since retiring he has become a podcaster and TV personality.

== Early life ==
Marler grew up in Heathfield, East Sussex, where he was educated at Maynards Green Primary School and Heathfield Community College and began playing at the age of 11 for Eastbourne Sharks. His stepping stones in the game not only include playing for Sussex Under 14-18 but also representing London & South East in 2006.

Marler started his career at Haywards Heath RFC in Sussex where he played in the same side as fellow England international Billy Twelvetrees.

== Club career ==
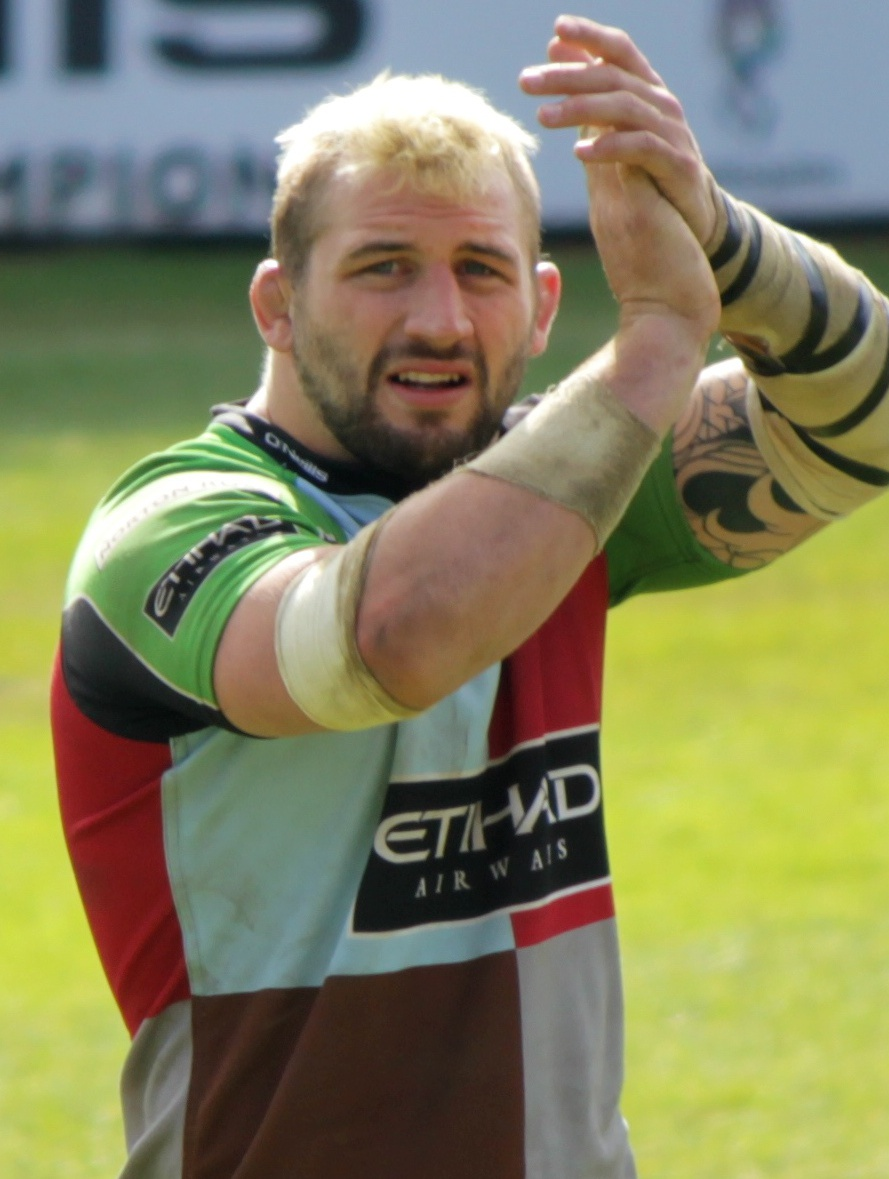
Marler with Harlequins in 2013.

Marler joined the Harlequins Academy in 2008 and made his first team debut in the 2009-2010 season, after spending some time on loan to Esher and Worthing. Marler has described his time in the lower tiers as a necessary learning curve that has allowed him to experience all the tricks of the trade at prop. He particularly points to the technical advice he received from one Bobby Walsh, a former coach, on scrummaging. The knowledge gained at this level has allowed him to occasionally cover the tighthead side of the scrum.

In May 2011 Marler started for the Harlequins side that defeated Stade Français in the final of the EPCR Challenge Cup. The following season saw Marler play a crucial part in helping Harlequins claim their first ever League title by starting in the 2011–12 Premiership final victory over Leicester Tigers.

Marler captained Harlequins for the 2014-2015 season, replacing Chris Robshaw due to his commitments as England captain in the 2015 World Cup year. Marler then passed the captaincy on to teammate Danny Care the next season. In January 2016 it was announced that Marler had signed a new contract to stay at the club and later that year he started for the Harlequins side that was defeated by Montpellier in the final of the EPCR Challenge Cup.

On 26 June 2021 Marler won his second league title starting for the Harlequins side that defeated Exeter Chiefs 40–38 in the highest scoring Premiership final ever.

Marler announced his retirement from the club on 27 November 2024. His final game was at The Stoop against Bristol Bears. During the game, he asked the referee Luke Pearce whether he would receive a yellow card for removing his shirt to which Pearce replied 'not tonight for you'. He was replaced for the final time by Fin Baxter in the second half.

== International career ==
=== England ===
In 2008 Marler was captain for England at U18s level. He represented England U20 in the 2009 Six Nations Under 20s Championship and was a member of the squad that finished runners up to New Zealand at the 2009 IRB Junior World Championship. The following year saw him score two tries in a game against Wales in the 2010 Six Nations Under 20s Championship. He also scored a try in a defeat against South Africa as England finished fourth at the 2010 IRB Junior World Championship. He was called into the senior England squad for the 2010 end of year tests as injury cover for David Wilson. In January 2011 Marler started for England A against Italy.

Marler was selected for the 2012 summer tour of South Africa and on 9 June 2012 made his senior debut starting in the opening test defeat to the Springboks. Marler was selected for the 2013 series against Argentina and then became a regular member of the squad. Coach Stuart Lancaster included Marler in his squad for the 2015 Rugby World Cup and he started for the hosts in the pool stage as they failed to reach the knockout phase.

New head coach Eddie Jones included Marler in his squad for the 2016 Six Nations Championship and he came off the bench in the concluding game of the tournament as England defeated France to achieve their first grand slam in over a decade. The following year saw Marler given the honour of leading the team out on his 50th cap against Scotland in the penultimate round of the 2017 Six Nations Championship. He also started in the last round of the tournament defeat away to Ireland which ensured England failed to complete consecutive grand slams and also brought an end to a record equalling eighteen successive Test victories.

In September 2018 Marler announced his retirement from international rugby but later reversed his decision, re-joining the England squad for the 2019 Rugby World Cup. Marler came off the bench for the semi-final victory over New Zealand and was a second half replacement for Mako Vunipola in the final as England were defeated by South Africa to finish runners up.

In March 2020, Marler was banned from playing for 10-weeks after he grabbed Alun Wyn Jones' genitals during a Six Nations match against Wales. As a result of the coronavirus lockdown, the ban ended without Marler missing any matches since every fixture that Marler could have played was postponed.

In December 2020 Marler was a second-half substitute for Ellis Genge as England defeated France in the final of the Autumn Nations Cup.

In September 2023, Marler returned to the England squad to play in the 2023 Rugby World Cup, his third World Cup with the senior side. In England's opening game vs Argentina, he replaced Ellis Genge in the 54th minute. He played in all Group matches, the Quarter Final win against Fiji and the Semi Final loss to South Africa. He did not play in the Bronze Medal match against Argentina.

Marler attracted attention in October 2024 after tweeting that "the Haka needs binning", calling the All Blacks' pre-match ritual "ridiculous." His comments were widely criticised, including by New Zealand coach Scott Robertson, with academic Karaitiana Taiuru saying that Marler "lacked cultural appreciation." Marler later apologised for his "poorly articulated" words, saying that he "meant no malice in asking for it to be binned, just want to see the restrictions lifted to allow for a response without sanction."

He announced his retirement from the team on 3 November 2024.

=== British & Irish Lions ===
On 19 April 2017, Marler was one of 41 players selected for the British & Irish Lions' tour to New Zealand in June and July of that year. He made five appearances in the tour games but did not feature in the Test series against New Zealand.

=== Barbarians ===
Marler was recruited into the Barbarians squad in 2019, making his only appearance for the team against England on 2 June alongside team mate James Horwill who captained the team. Marler returned to play for England again four months later at the 2019 Rugby World Cup.

Marler was recruited again to the squad in 2022, after missing out on a call up to England's 2022 Autumn nations series fixtures alongside fellow England international Zach Mercer. The squad was coached by Scott Robertson and Ronan O'Gara. They faced the All Blacks XV on 13 November, Marler facing the Barbarians five days later with his club side Harlequins.

== Disciplinary issues ==
In April 2016, Marler received a two match ban and £20,000 fine (to be donated to a suitable equality charity) for using unsporting and discriminatory language towards Samson Lee during the England versus Wales Six Nations match held on 12 March.

In March 2020, he received a ten week match ban for grabbing Alun Wyn Jones’s genitals during the England versus Wales Six Nations match held on 7 March 2020.

In December 2022, Marler received a six-week ban (four of them suspended) for conduct prejudicial to the game involving insulting language used in an incident with Bristol Bears flanker Jake Heenan. It was later revealed Heenan's mother had been ill in hospital around the time of the incident. Following the match, Marler apologised publicly and privately.

== Other ventures ==
In 2020, Marler wrote a book about his life: Loose Head, Confessions of an (un)professional rugby player, published by Ebury Press.

He also hosts the podcast "Joe Marler's Things People Do" previously known as "The Joe Marler Show.".

Marler has appeared as a celebrity panellist on BBC One gameshow The Wheel in November 2021 and the 2023 Christmas special.

Marler featured in a 2022 advert for condom brand Durex and operated an OnlyFans account, where subscribers would be able to purchase pictures of his feet.

In May 2025, Marler was announced as a contestant on the first series of The Celebrity Traitors. Marler made it to the final round alongside fellow faithfuls, Nick Mohammed, David Olusoga and traitor Alan Carr. He was ultimately voted out by the group. During the final Marler said, "Being in The Traitors final is way more stressful than playing for England".

== Personal life ==
Marler and his wife Daisy have four children.

Marler has been open that he often struggles with his mental health. This was the subject of a 2021 Sky Sports documentary Big Boys Don't Cry, which was aired to coincide with Mental Health Awareness Week.

== Honours ==
England

- 3× Six Nations Championship: 2016, 2017, 2020
- 1× Autumn Nations Cup: 2020
- 1× Rugby World Cup runner-up: 2019

Harlequins

- 2× Premiership Rugby: 2012, 2021
- 1× EPCR Challenge Cup: 2011
- 1× EPCR Challenge Cup runner-up: 2016

== Bibliography ==
- Marler, Joe; Murphy, Rachel (2020). Loose Head: Confessions of an (un)professional rugby player. London: Ebury Press. ISBN 978-1529107517.
