= Tomás Vallejos =

Argentine rugby player (born 1984)

Tomás Vallejos Cinalli
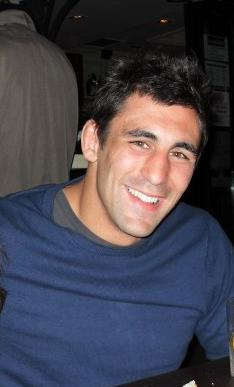
- Born: Tomás Vallejos Cinalli; October 16, 1984 (age 42) Rosario, Santa Fe, Argentina
- Height: 196 cm (6 ft 5 in)
- Weight: 113 kg (17 st 11 lb)

Rugby union career
- Position: Lock
- Current team: USO Nevers
Amateur team(s)
Years	Team	Apps	(Points)
- Logaritmo Rugby
Senior career
Years	Team	Apps	(Points)
2007–10	Parma	24	(15)
2010–12	Harlequins	56	(5)
2012-13	Scarlets	8	(0)
2013	Pampas XV	5	(0)
2013–14	Coca-Cola Red Sparks	7	(0)
2014-15	Treviso	17	(0)
2015	Stade Français	4	(0)
2015−16	Provence	12	(5)
2016−18	USO Nevers	27	(10)
- Correct as of 15 June 2014
International career
Years	Team	Apps	(Points)
2011–13	Argentina	7	(0)
- Correct as of 24 June 2013

Tomás Vallejos Cinalli (born 16 October 1984) is an Argentine rugby union player.

A lock forward, Vallejos started his career at Logaritmo Rugby Club in Rosario, before moving to Italy to play professionally for Overmach Parma. Vallejos signed for English side Harlequins during the 2009–10 season to fill the gap left by the injured Jim Evans. He was a replacement for Harlequins in their 2011–12 Premiership final victory over Leicester Tigers. In June 2012 Vallejos joined the Welsh regional team the Scarlets. He was granted a release from his contract with Scarlets to allow him join the Pampas XV and compete fully in the 2013 Vodacom Cup.

== International ==
Vallejos has represented Argentina in the U17, U18, U20 and U23 age groups, and won his first senior cap as a replacement at the 2011 Rugby World Cup against Georgia.
