= Ian Ramsey Church of England Academy =

Location
- Fairfield Road; Stockton-on-Tees, County Durham, TS19 7AJ; England; 54°33′40″N 1°21′03″W

Information
- Type: Academy
- Religious affiliation: Church of England
- Local authority: Stockton-on-Tees
- Department for Education URN: 141369 Tables
- Ofsted: Reports
- Gender: Mixed
- Age: 11 to 16
- Enrolment: c. 1200
- Colours: Navy and Gold
- Website: http://www.ianramsey.org.uk/

Ian Ramsey Church of England Academy (formerly Ian Ramsey Church of England School) is a mixed Church of England secondary school located in Stockton-on-Tees, County Durham. It is named after Bishop Ian Ramsey, a former Bishop of Durham. The new Head of the School (as of April 2015) is Brian Janes the Executive Headteacher is Gill Booth, who came to support Ian Ramsey from Venerable Bede in Sunderland after it was put into special measures by Ofsted, which led to the resignation of the former Headteacher Janet Wilson in May 2014. The school is always oversubscribed. Ian Ramsey Church of England School converted to academy status on 1 December 2014 and was renamed Ian Ramsey Church of England Academy.

== Academic standards ==
The school was awarded specialist status in Languages in 1999.

The November 2007 Ofsted Report rated Ian Ramsey school as "good". The inspectors said "This is a good school. Standards are above average and students’ achievement is good... Some aspects of the school’s work are outstanding... The personal development of students is outstanding and a significant strength of school life".

In March 2011, Ofsted Report again rated the school as "good".

In May 2014, the school was placed into special measures.

In October 2017, the school was rated good by Ofsted report

== Awards ==
In February 2001, Ian Ramsey was accorded Charter Mark status.

The school was awarded Artsmark Silver in August 2008.

In March 2004, Simon Keay, 16, won the Diana, Princess of Wales Memorial Award.

== Building Schools for the Future ==
The Building Schools for the Future Project investment programme aimed to rebuild or renew nearly every secondary school in England. Ian Ramsey had asked that they rebuild on their current site, instead of moving to a new site. Primary schools across Stockton in Year 6 presented their ideas to Ian Ramsey staff of what they see in a secondary school.

Due to cuts in government spending, Building Schools For The Future Project is no longer active and the majority of proposed rebuilds have now been scrapped.

In May 2013, the go-ahead for the current school to be replaced with a brand new one was given.

Students and staff moved into the new building in September 2014.

== Durham Lesotho Link ==
For a number of years now Ian Ramsey has been working with a project called the Durham Lesotho Link, where staff and pupils raise money for schools and orphanages in Lesotho. There have been staff and student visits to the country during which the students visited a local school just outside the capital Maseru and worked with a children's orphanage.

== Notable former pupils ==
- Lee Cattermole — Sunderland AFC footballer
- Allison Curbishley — Great Britain Olympic athlete
- Jonathan Franks — Hartlepool United footballer
- Steve Hackney — former Leicester Tigers rugby union club
- Richard Hope — Former footballer with Blackburn, Darlington and Northampton.
- Robert Icke, Olivier award winning theatre writer and director.
- Geoff Parling — Leicester Tigers rugby union club and England player
