= Heathfield Community College =

Location
- Cade Street; Heathfield, East Sussex, TN21 8RJ; England; 50°58′01″N 0°16′41″E

Information
- Type: Community school
- Established: 1950
- Local authority: East Sussex
- Department for Education URN: 114587 Tables
- Ofsted: Reports
- Headteacher: Caroline Barlow
- Gender: Coeducational
- Age: 10 to 18
- Website: http://www.heathfieldcc.co.uk/

Heathfield Community College is a secondary school near the market town of Heathfield, East Sussex, England.

== School Enrollment ==
The college draws its students from a large geographical area. There are currently over 1200 students on roll, with approximately 250 in the Sixth Form.

Founded in 1950, the school was initially envisioned to include an average of 800 students, but now has an average enrollment of 1400 students between the ages of 11 and 18 years old. In 2003 Heathfield Community College was awarded Specialist status in the Visual and Performing Arts, providing funding to be used for arts subjects.

Heathfield Community College is separated into two sections, Secondary School and Sixth Form college.

In 2018, the head teacher Caroline Barlow was criticised by the coastguard and the National Trust for posting a photograph captioned "living on the edge" which appeared to show her near the edge of a cliff top at the Birling Gap. As well as closing her Twitter account, she responded by saying that the post was meant light-heartedly, that she was much further away from the edge than she appeared, and that she supported safe behaviour, as well as having learned more about the risks of social media.

== Notable former pupils ==
- England rugby player Joe Marler
- England badminton player Heather Olver
- Member of Parliament Helena Dollimore
