= Joe Duffey =

- Born: Joseph Duffey; 22 June 1982 (age 44) Gisborne, New Zealand
- Height: 1.78 m (5 ft 10 in)
- Weight: 104 kg (16 st 5 lb)
- School: G.B.H.S

Rugby union career
- Position: Hooker
Senior career
Years	Team	Apps	(Points)
2003–2009	Nottingham	152	(175)
2009–2011	Leicester Tigers	12	(0)
2011–2013	Nottingham	53	(20)
2003–2013	Total	217	(195)

Joe Duffey (born 22 June 1982) is a retired rugby union player who played hooker for Nottingham RFC in the RFU Championship between 2003 and 2009, then again between 2011 and 2013, he played for Leicester Tigers in Premiership Rugby between 2009 and 2011. He is Maori descent from his mother's side and belongs to Te aitanga a Hauiti, Ngati Hei and Ngati Porou Iwi and also Irish/English descent from his father's side.

== Career ==
Duffey spent five seasons at Nottingham RFC before joining Leicester Tigers in the summer of 2009. Duffey was a replacement as Leicester won the 2010 Premiership final. Having spent two seasons with Leicester Tigers, Duffey rejoined Nottingham RFC for the 2011/12 season. He left Nottingham again in 2013 to return to his native New Zealand.
