= Carl Fearns =

English rugby union footballer

- Born: Carl Fearns; 28 May 1989 (age 37) Liverpool, Merseyside, England
- Height: 1.91 m (6 ft 3 in)
- Weight: 122 kg (19 st 3 lb)
- School: St Mary's College, Crosby; Sedbergh School

Rugby union career
- Position(s): Number Eight, Flanker
- Current team: Newcastle Falcons
Senior career
Years	Team	Apps	(Points)
2008–2011	Sale Sharks	60	(5)
2011–2015	Bath	73	(15)
2015–2020	Lyon	66	(55)
2020–2021	Rouen	9	(5)
2021–	Newcastle Falcons		
- Correct as of 08 November 2016
International career
Years	Team	Apps	(Points)
2009	England U20	5	(25)
2011-	England Saxons		

Carl Fearns (born 28 May 1989 in Liverpool, England) is an English rugby union player. He plays as a back-row forward.

Fearns made his Sale debut in an EDF Energy Cup match against Cardiff Blues, winning the Man of the Match award.

Fearns captained England at U18 level. He was a member of the England Under 20 team that reached the final of the 2009 IRB Junior World Championship. His performances in this tournament led to him being nominated for the IRB Junior Player of the Year award.

Fearns missed the whole of the 2007–08 season due to knee reconstruction.

It was announced on 8 March 2011 that Fearns had signed for Bath on a 2-year deal.

On 10 July 2013, Fearns knocked out Bath teammate Gavin Henson on a night out in the city.

On 7 November 2016, Fearns made Sky Sports Team of the Week after a season defining performance for Lyon against Toulon.

On 19 May 2020, it was confirmed that Fearns would stay in France as he signed for Rouen in the second-level Pro D2 from the 2020-21 season.

He left Rouen to join Premiership Rugby side Newcastle Falcons on a two-year deal in April 2021. He left Newcastle Falcons in 2023.
