= Rupert Harden =

England international rugby union player

- Born: Rupert Harden; 9 May 1985 (age 41) Melbourne, Australia
- Height: 1.91 m (6 ft 3 in)
- Weight: 118 kg (18 st 8 lb)
- School: Rugby School

Rugby union career
- Position: Prop
Youth career
- -: London
- –: Cumbria
- –: Newcastle Falcons Academy
Senior career
Years	Team	Apps	(Points)
2008-2009	Tynedale		
2009-2014	Gloucester Rugby	93	(0)
2014-2016	Benetton Treviso	35	(0)
2016-2017	Richmond	38	(5)
2017-2020	Hartpury College	36	(0)
International career
Years	Team	Apps	(Points)
–	England Counties		
–	England Saxons		
–	England		

Rupert Harden (born 9 May 1985) is a former rugby union footballer. He played as a prop.

Formerly part of the Newcastle Falcons Academy, tighthead Harden spent 2008–09 with National Division Two side Tynedale where he had spent time on loan.

The Australian-born prop mixed his youth between London, Rugby School and Cumbria and represented England Counties.

He caught the eyes of the Gloucester coaching set up whilst playing against Cinderford and will be looking to further his rugby development at Kingsholm. He is also registered to play with Moseley

Rupert Harden was called up to England .England for the tour in South Africa in summer 2012.

On 12 June 2014, Harden left Gloucester Rugby as he signed a contract to join Italy region Benetton Treviso for next season.

On 25 July 2017 Hartpury College signed Rupert Harden for the 2017-18 Season.
