= Geoff Parling =

British Lions & England international rugby union player & coach

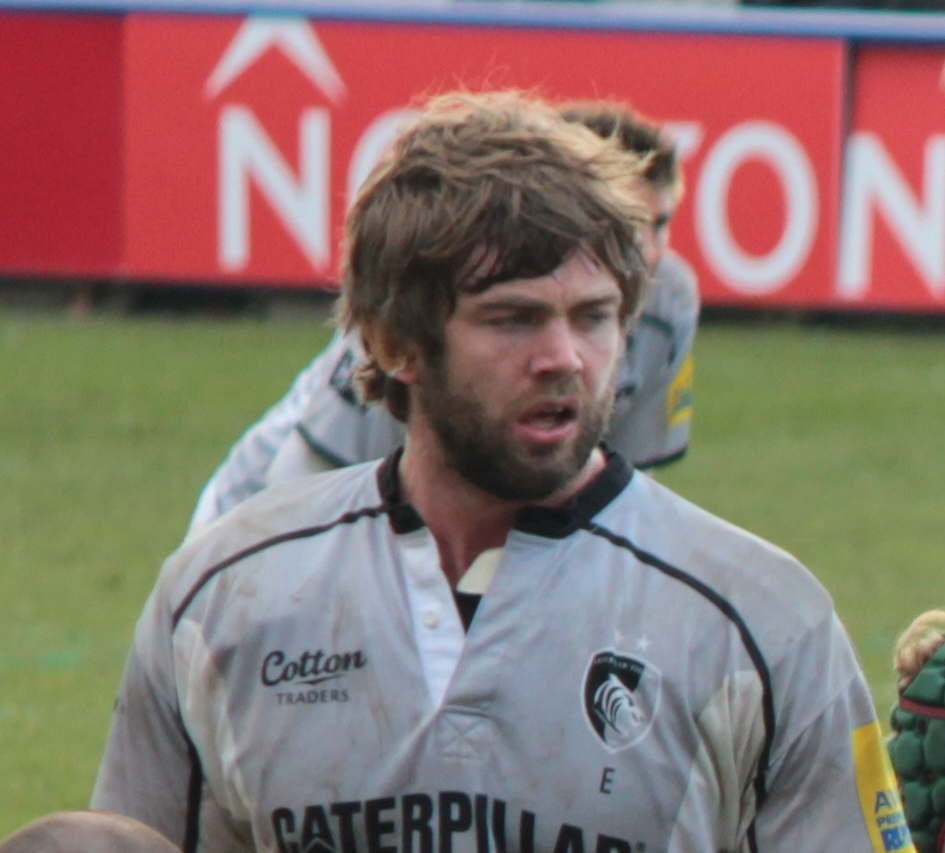
- Parling playing for Leicester Tigers in 2012
- Born: Geoff Parling; 28 October 1983 (age 43) Stockton-on-Tees, England
- Height: 1.99 m (6 ft 6 in)
- Weight: 117 kg (18 st 6 lb)
- School: Ian Ramsey C of E School and Durham School
- University: Newcastle University

Rugby union career
- Position: Lock
Senior career
Years	Team	Apps	(Points)
2003–2009	Newcastle Falcons	116	(40)
2009–2015	Leicester Tigers	93	(15)
2015–2017	Exeter Chiefs	50	(5)
2017–2018	Munakata Sanix Blues	12	(0)
2018	Melbourne Rebels	11	(0)
2003–2018	Total	282	(60)
International career
Years	Team	Apps	(Points)
2012–2015	England	29	(5)
2013	British & Irish Lions	3	(0)
Coaching career
- Years: Team
- 2020—2025: Australia (Forwards Coach)
- 2025–: Leicester Tigers (Head Coach)

Geoff Parling (born 28 October 1983) is an English rugby union coach and former player. He is the head coach of Leicester Tigers in Premiership Rugby.

During his career Parling played lock and backrow for Newcastle Falcons, Leicester Tigers and Exeter Chiefs in Premiership Rugby, he won three English titles as a player, two with Leicester in 2010 and 2013 then again with Exeter in 2017. He played in Japan for Munakata Sanix Blues and for Melbourne Rebels in Super Rugby. He won 29 caps for England, appearing at the 2015 Rugby World Cup and won three caps for the British & Irish Lions on the 2013 tour to Australia.

After retiring from playing Parling worked as a forwards coach, including for the Australia national team.

On 12 May 2025 he was appointed as Leicester Tigers head coach for the start of the 2025-26 Premiership Rugby season.

== Early life and education ==
Parling was born in Stockton-on-Tees, England. He studied business and economics at Newcastle University.

== Rugby playing career ==
=== Junior level ===
Parling represented England at Under 16s, Under 18s, Under 19s, and Under 21 level.

=== Club level ===
After university Parling began his club career at Newcastle Falcons. Parling became a first team regular in the 2005–06 season, winning the players' player of the year award. Parling captained Newcastle on several occasions during the 2006–07 season. He was the runner-up for the Gatorade Performance of the Guinness Premiership Season 2008–09.

Parling signed a contract to play for Leicester Tigers for the 2009/10 season.

Parling's debut for Leicester Tigers came against the club he had just left, and his first start for the club was in the Heineken Cup clash with Benetton Treviso. He also played in the Friendly match against South Africa, which the Tigers won 22–17.

Injuries to other Tigers players helped him to hold down a starting berth at lock, and the Tigers topped the table. They went on to win the 2009–10 Guinness Premiership final 33–27 against Saracens. Parling stole a vital line-out in the final minute of the game, which was right on the Tigers' try-line. He was voted Newcomer of the Year by Tigers supporters.

Parling won a second Premiership title in 2013, this time defeating Northampton Saints in the final.

On 29 January 2015, it was announced Parling had signed for Exeter Chiefs on a two-year deal. He started the final as Exeter Chiefs defeated Wasps to be crowned champions of the 2016–17 English Premiership.

=== International level ===
Parling was added to the revised England Saxons squad as cover for Nick Kennedy on 25 January 2010. He played in the wins against Ireland A and Italy A. Parling was selected in the 44-man England squad to tour Australia in June 2010, and played in the first game against the Australian Barbarians, though missed out on selection for the second as a result of a neck injury.

In January 2012, Parling was called up to the England senior squad in preparation for their Six Nations campaign as an injury replacement for Louis Deacon. He earned two caps off the bench before starting at lock against Wales, in a tightly fought loss. His good performance (particularly at the line-out) saw him retained at lock for the following wins against France and Ireland, where he put in even better performances which saw him run the offensive and defensive line-outs well. He finished the tournament as the first-choice lock, ahead of Tom Palmer.

In April 2013, Parling was selected for the 2013 British & Irish Lions tour to Australia. He played in each Test, coming on as a replacement in the first Test and starting in the second and third. He also captained one of the tour games.

=== Playing honours ===
Leicester

2x Gallagher Premiership: 2010, 2013

Exeter

1x Gallagher Premiership: 2017

Lions

1x Test Series: 2013

=== International tries ===
Try	Opposing team	Location	Venue	Competition	Date	Result
1	Scotland	London, England	Twickenham	2013 Six Nations Championship	2 February 2013	Won

=== Super Rugby statistics ===
As of 15 July 2018

Season	Team	Games	Starts	Sub	Mins	Tries	Cons	Pens	Drops	Points	Yel	Red
2018	Rebels	11	6	5	467	0	0	0	0	0	0	0
Total		11	6	5	467	0	0	0	0	0	0	0

== Rugby coaching career ==
After retirement from playing in 2018 Parling became lineout coach for the Melbourne Rebels.

In September 2020 Parling was appointed as Australia's forward coach in Dave Rennie's new coaching team.

In May 2025 Parling was announced as the new head coach of Leicester Tigers on what was described as a long term deal.

== Personal life ==
Parling is married with three children.
