= Anthony Allen (rugby union) =

England international rugby union player

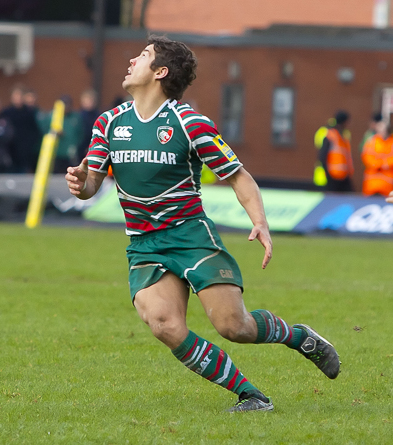
- Allen in 2012
- Born: Anthony Allen; 1 September 1986 (age 40) Southampton, England
- Height: 1.80 m (5 ft 11 in)
- Weight: 91 kg (14 st 5 lb)
- School: Clayesmore School; Millfield School; Boundary Oak School

Rugby union career
- Position: Inside Centre
Amateur team(s)
Years	Team	Apps	(Points)
–	Trojans R.F.C		
–	NEC Harlequins		
Senior career
Years	Team	Apps	(Points)
2005–2009	Gloucester Rugby	91	(110)
2009–2015	Leicester Tigers	126	(75)
2005–2015	Total	217	(185)
International career
Years	Team	Apps	(Points)
2005–2006	England U20	10	(25)
2006	England	2	(0)
2008	England Saxons	7	(15)
2012	England XV	2	(5)
Coaching career
- Years: Team
- 2019–2020: Coventry (defence coach)

Anthony Allen (born 1 September 1986) is a former England international rugby union player and coach. He played for Premiership Rugby club Gloucester 91 times between 2005 and 2009 then 126 times for Leicester Tigers as a centre before his retirement due to injury in 2015. He was a Premiership champion in 2010 and 2013, where he was named man of the match in the final.

After his playing career he had a spell as Coventry's defence coach.

== Early life ==
Born in Southampton, in his early life, he played rugby for the Trojans Rugby Club at Stoneham Lane, Eastleigh in Hampshire. In 1999, Allen toured South Africa with the South England Schools side, beating Natal 22–20. In the middle of the tour Allen was hospitalised with food poisoning, missing the end of the Tour. In 2000 Allen Won the Hampshire Cup with the Trojans Under-13 side, whilst attending Boundary Oak School at Roche Court, just outside Fareham. From there he moved on to Clayesmore School at the age of 13, where he was a member of Devine House. He was a member of the Clayesmore 1st XVs from year 10, effectively playing three years above his age group.

== Gloucester career ==
=== 2005–06 ===
In 2005, Allen joined Gloucester straight from Millfield School. At the start of the season, Allen helped Gloucester to triumph in the Middlesex 7s with some fantastic tries. He made his first team debut in Gloucester's Anglo Welsh Cup match against Bristol, which Gloucester won 34–6. Allen scored his first try for Gloucester in their 106–3 demolition of Bucuresti. His first Guinness Premiership try came 2 weeks later against Leicester at Welford Road. A glorious try against Worcester Warriors helped Gloucester to the European Challenge Cup Final. During his first season with Gloucester, Allen summed up his tremendous talent with a glorious brace of tries against London Wasps. He also played an important role in the defeat of London Irish in the European Challenge Cup Final.

=== 2006–07 ===
After a great start to the season England came calling for Allen. His performance against Agen at Kingsholm, where he scored two tries in defeat, was a catalyst for his call up. On 28 November 2006, Allen signed a two-year extension to his contract. He came back from national duty and continued his great form for Gloucester with 3 tries in 3 games in December. Allen finished the season with 9 tries including one in Gloucester's semi-final victory against Saracens. He was also voted the young player of the season by Gloucester's fans. Unfortunately for Allen and Gloucester they suffered defeat at the hands of Leicester in the Guinness Premiership final.

=== 2007–08 ===
Allen started the season fantastically, with two tries in the opening 2 weeks against Leeds Carnegie and Saracens. Tries against Ospreys and Bourgoin in the Heineken Cup, helped Gloucester to enter the quarter-finals. Allen was one of the key players for Gloucester, starting 29 games, more than anybody else in the squad. As well as Allen's obvious talent for breaking tackles and scoring tries, his immense tackling played a vital role to the team.

=== 2008–09 ===
Allen, in his fourth season playing for Gloucester, firmly established himself as first choice inside centre alongside Mike Tindall at outside centre. The arrival of Olly Barkley from Bath presented a higher level of competition for Allen than in previous seasons. On the opening day of the season, Allen suffered an injury against Leicester which kept him out for 2 months. He returned in November against Saracens and his try in this game helped Gloucester to a win at Vicarage Road. Gloucester ended the season disappointingly and Allen moved to Leicester for the 2009/10 season.

== Leicester career ==
=== 2009–10 ===
In his first season at Leicester, Allen was faced with breaking into a first-choice centre pairing of Aaron Mauger and Dan Hipkiss. However, his ability to cover both positions and a series of injuries to his rivals allowed him to quickly establish himself in the side. Before long, he was a first-choice centre and he marked his debut season at the club with the first major trophy of his career as Leicester won the Guinness Premiership final against Saracens. He finished the season with six tries in 28 games in all competitions.

=== 2010–11 ===
His second season saw Allen as Leicester's first-choice inside centre alongside the teenage Manu Tuilagi. Allen put in a series of solid performances—both in attack and defence—that earned no international recognition, but saw him named as the Player's Player of the Season and scorer of Try of the Season for his solo score against Bath.

=== 2012–13 ===
Allen won his second Premiership title when playing in the final as Leicester defeated Northampton.

== England ==
He made his England debut against New Zealand on 5 November 2006, partnering Newcastle Falcons' Jamie Noon in the centre. Allen received multiple stitches in his mouth halfway through that first half after being hit in the face by his New Zealand opposite number, but Allen was dropped after they lost 25–18 to Argentina.

He was an integral part of the England Saxons sides that won the Churchill Cup in Canada / USA 2008 and again in 2010.

== Coaching career ==
All was appointed defence coach at Championship club Coventry in 2019, before relinquishing the role in November 2020 to pursue interests away from rugby.
