= George Lowe (rugby union) =

English rugby union player (born 1989)

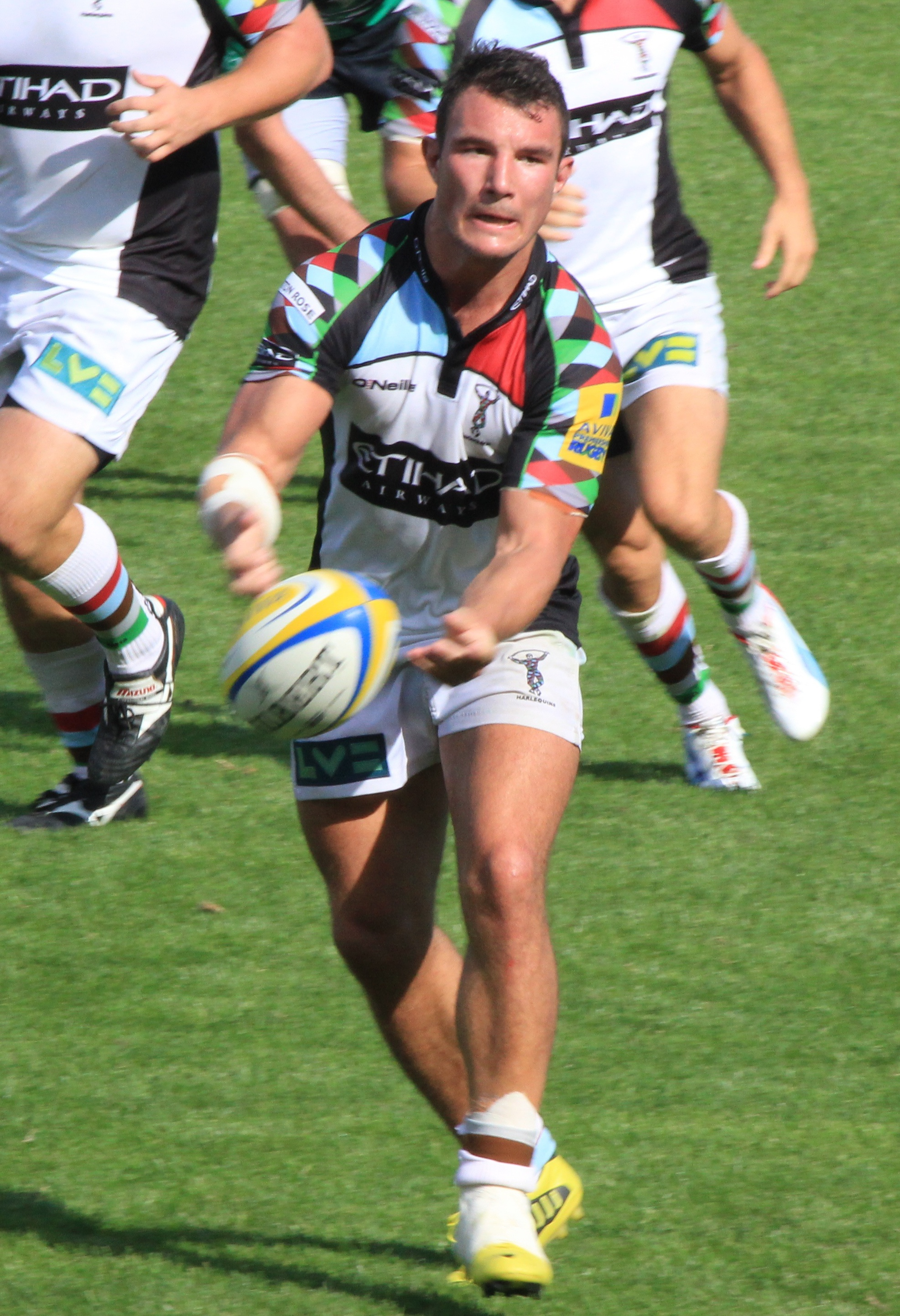
- Born: 22 October 1989 (age 37) Kingston-upon-Thames, England
- Height: 1.78 m (5 ft 10 in)
- Weight: 90 kg (14 st; 200 lb)
- School: Epsom College

Rugby union career
- Position(s): Inside Centre, Wing
Youth career
- Harlequins Academy
Senior career
Years	Team	Apps	(Points)
2008–2017	Harlequins	139	(140)
- Correct as of 30 August 2017

George Lowe (born 22 October 1989 in England), is an English former rugby union player for Harlequins. He played as a Centre or on the Wing.

Lowe made his first grade debut in the Premiership for Harlequins against Wasps on 5 September 2009.

Lowe joined the Quins Academy Professionals in summer 2008, after leaving Epsom College, where he played in their first XV.

He represented Surrey U18s, and also played for Harlequins in the A league whilst still a schoolboy. Lowe was called up to the England U20s squad for the U20 Six Nations, where he was in fine try-scoring form, and continued to represent England U20s throughout the Junior World Championship in the summer of 2009.

An impressive 2010/11 season saw him help Quins claim the Amlin Challenge Cup and get shortlisted for the Land Rover Discovery of the Season. In the 2011/12 season, Lowe was a key part of the Harlequins team which won the Aviva Premiership for the first time in their history. Lowe started the final against Leicester Tigers, helping Harlequins to a 33–23 win. His efforts throughout the season saw him get included in Stuart Lancaster's England squad for the 2012 Summer tour to South Africa. In the summer of 2012, his body nutrition shakes, "Lowetein", was released.

On 30 August 2017 Lowe announced his retirement from Rugby Union due to neck and back injuries.
