= 2014 England rugby union tour of New Zealand =

Rugby union test series in 2014

- Coach: Stuart Lancaster
- Tour captain: Chris Robshaw
- Top point scorer: Freddie Burns (20)
- Top try scorer: Marland Yarde (2)
- Top test point scorer: Freddie Burns (20)
- Top test try scorer: Marland Yarde (2)
Summary
P	W	D	L
Total
5	1	0	4
Test match
3	0	0	3
Opponent
P	W	D	L
New Zealand
3	3	0	0

Tour chronology
- ← Argentina 2013 Australia 2016 →

In June 2014, England played a three test series against New Zealand as part of the 2014 mid-year rugby union tests. They played the All Blacks across the three weeks that the June International window is allocated to; 7 June–21 June, and contested the Hillary Shield, in which England has won once to New Zealand's four. The series was part of the second year of the global rugby calendar established by the International Rugby Board, which runs through to 2019. In addition to the test series, England also played Super Rugby side Crusaders, in a mid-week uncapped match ahead of the third test in Hamilton. They also played the Barbarians at Twickenham, for their annual meeting at the stadium before the tour.

New Zealand won the series 3–0, scoring 84 points to England's 55 over the three test matches.

== Fixtures ==
Date	Venue	Home	Score	Away
1 June 2014	Twickenham Stadium, London	England	29–39	Barbarians
7 June 2014	Eden Park, Auckland	New Zealand	20–15	England
14 June 2014	Forsyth Barr Stadium, Dunedin	New Zealand	28–27	England
17 June 2014	AMI Stadium, Christchurch	Crusaders	7–38	England
21 June 2014	Waikato Stadium, Hamilton	New Zealand	36–13	England

== Squads ==
Note: Caps and ages are to 7 June, pre first test.

=== England ===
On 26 May, Stuart Lancaster named two squads. A 23-man squad for the annual uncapped match against the Barbarians, coached by Jon Callard and Joe Lydon, and a 30-man squad for their test series against New Zealand. This squad did not feature any players from Saracens or Northampton Saints due to the 2013–14 Aviva Premiership final. Following the final, Lancaster named an additional squad to join the team ahead of the second test against New Zealand.

On 27 May, prop Nathan Catt was added to the touring squad to New Zealand due to fitness concerns over other props. Fraser Balmain replaced Catt for the Barbarians match.

On 2 June, Lancaster added an additional 16 players to the touring squad. 15 of which were call-ups, while 1, Kyle Sinckler, was promoted from the England XV side after the Barbarians match.

On 13 June, Michael Paterson was added to the touring squad to cover the second row ahead of the uncapped match against the Crusaders.

- Head coach: (England) Stuart Lancaster

Note: Flags indicate national union for the club/province as defined by World Rugby.

Player	Position	Date of birth (age)	Caps	Club/province
Rob Buchanan^{1}	Hooker	13 May 1991 (aged 23)	0	(England) Harlequins
Luke Cowan-Dickie	Hooker	20 June 1993 (aged 20)	0	(England) Exeter Chiefs
Joe Gray	Hooker	5 August 1988 (aged 25)	0	(England) Harlequins
Dylan Hartley^{2}	Hooker	24 March 1986 (aged 28)	55	(England) Northampton Saints
Tommy Taylor^{1}	Hooker	11 November 1991 (aged 22)	0	(England) Sale Sharks
Dave Ward	Hooker	21 May 1985 (aged 29)	0	(England) Harlequins
Rob Webber	Hooker	1 August 1986 (aged 27)	5	(England) Bath
Fraser Balmain^{1}	Prop	16 November 1991 (aged 22)	0	(England) Leicester Tigers
Kieran Brookes	Prop	29 August 1990 (aged 23)	0	(England) Newcastle Falcons
Nathan Catt	Prop	6 January 1988 (aged 26)	0	(England) Bath
Will Collier^{1}	Prop	5 May 1991 (aged 23)	0	(England) Harlequins
Ross Harrison^{1}	Prop	3 September 1992 (aged 21)	0	(England) Sale Sharks
Joe Marler	Prop	7 July 1990 (aged 23)	19	(England) Harlequins
Matt Mullan	Prop	23 February 1987 (aged 27)	3	(England) London Wasps
Kyle Sinckler^{1,2}	Prop	30 March 1993 (aged 21)	0	(England) Harlequins
Henry Thomas	Prop	30 October 1991 (aged 22)	6	(England) Sale Sharks
Alex Waller^{2}	Prop	14 February 1990 (aged 24)	0	(England) Northampton Saints
David Wilson	Prop	9 April 1985 (aged 29)	34	(England) Bath
Dave Attwood	Lock	5 April 1987 (aged 27)	10	(England) Bath
Graham Kitchener^{1}	Lock	29 September 1989 (aged 24)	0	(England) Leicester Tigers
Courtney Lawes^{2}	Lock	23 February 1989 (aged 25)	30	(England) Northampton Saints
Joe Launchbury	Lock	12 April 1991 (aged 23)	19	(England) London Wasps
Charlie Matthews^{1}	Lock	26 July 1991 (aged 22)	0	(England) Harlequins
Michael Paterson^{1,2}	Lock	9 May 1985 (aged 29)	0	(England) Sale Sharks
Geoff Parling	Lock	28 October 1983 (aged 30)	19	(England) Leicester Tigers
Ed Slater	Lock	1 August 1988 (aged 25)	0	(England) Leicester Tigers
James Gaskell^{1}	Flanker	20 May 1990 (aged 24)	0	(England) Sale Sharks
Jamie Gibson^{1}	Flanker	27 September 1990 (aged 23)	0	(England) Leicester Tigers
James Haskell	Flanker	2 April 1985 (aged 29)	50	(England) London Wasps
Tom Johnson	Flanker	16 July 1982 (aged 31)	7	(England) Exeter Chiefs
Matt Kvesic	Flanker	14 April 1992 (aged 22)	2	(England) Gloucester
Chris Robshaw	Flanker	4 June 1986 (aged 28)	25	(England) Harlequins
Luke Wallace^{1}	Flanker	2 October 1990 (aged 23)	0	(England) Harlequins
Tom Wood^{2}	Flanker	3 November 1986 (aged 27)	28	(England) Northampton Saints
Dave Ewers^{1}	Number 8	3 November 1990 (aged 23)	0	(England) Exeter Chiefs
Ben Morgan	Number 8	18 February 1989 (aged 25)	20	(England) Gloucester
Billy Vunipola^{2}	Number 8	3 November 1992 (aged 21)	8	(England) Saracens
Danny Care	Scrum-half	2 January 1987 (aged 27)	47	(England) Harlequins
Lee Dickson^{2}	Scrum-half	29 March 1985 (aged 29)	16	(England) Northampton Saints
Dan Robson^{1}	Scrum-half	14 March 1992 (aged 22)	0	(England) Gloucester
Joe Simpson^{1}	Scrum-half	5 July 1988 (aged 25)	1	(England) London Wasps
Richard Wigglesworth^{2}	Scrum-half	9 June 1983 (aged 30)	14	(England) Saracens
Ben Youngs	Scrum-half	5 September 1989 (aged 24)	35	(England) Leicester Tigers
Freddie Burns	Fly-half	13 May 1990 (aged 24)	3	(England) Gloucester
Danny Cipriani	Fly-half	2 November 1987 (aged 26)	7	(England) Sale Sharks
Ollie Devoto^{1}	Fly-half	22 September 1993 (aged 20)	0	(England) Bath
Owen Farrell^{2}	Fly-half	24 September 1991 (aged 22)	24	(England) Saracens
Stephen Myler^{2}	Fly-half	21 July 1984 (aged 29)	1	(England) Northampton Saints
Henry Slade^{1}	Fly-half	19 March 1993 (aged 21)	0	(England) Exeter Chiefs
Brad Barritt^{2}	Centre	7 August 1986 (aged 27)	18	(England) Saracens
Luther Burrell^{2}	Centre	6 December 1987 (aged 26)	5	(England) Northampton Saints
Kyle Eastmond	Centre	17 July 1989 (aged 24)	2	(England) Bath
Sam Hill^{1}	Centre	14 July 1993 (aged 20)	0	(England) Exeter Chiefs
Jonathan Joseph^{1}	Centre	21 May 1991 (aged 23)	6	(England) Bath
Henry Trinder	Centre	14 April 1989 (aged 25)	0	(England) Gloucester
Manu Tuilagi	Centre	18 May 1991 (aged 23)	22	(England) Leicester Tigers
Billy Twelvetrees	Centre	15 November 1988 (aged 25)	13	(England) Gloucester
Chris Ashton^{2}	Wing	26 March 1987 (aged 27)	37	(England) Saracens
Jonny May	Wing	1 April 1990 (aged 24)	6	(England) Gloucester
Semesa Rokoduguni^{1}	Wing	28 August 1987 (aged 26)	0	(England) Bath
Charlie Sharples^{1}	Wing	17 August 1989 (aged 24)	4	(England) Gloucester
Anthony Watson^{2}	Wing	26 February 1994 (aged 20)	0	(England) Bath
Marland Yarde	Wing	20 April 1992 (aged 22)	2	(England) London Irish
Mike Brown	Fullback	4 September 1985 (aged 28)	26	(England) Harlequins
Elliot Daly^{1}	Fullback	8 October 1992 (aged 21)	0	(England) London Wasps
Ben Foden^{2}	Fullback	22 July 1985 (aged 28)	34	(England) Northampton Saints
Alex Goode^{2}	Fullback	7 May 1988 (aged 26)	16	(England) Saracens
Rob Miller^{1}	Fullback	5 August 1989 (aged 24)	0	(England) Sale Sharks
Chris Pennell	Fullback	26 April 1987 (aged 27)	0	(England) Worcester Warriors

^{1} indicates players selected for the 23-man squad for the Barbarians match. ^{2} indicates players added to the touring squad on 2 June.

=== New Zealand ===
New Zealand's 31-man squad for their June 2014 Test series against England.

On 2 June 2014, Matt Todd was added to the squad to provide cover for Sam Cane.

All squad members play rugby in New Zealand.

- Head coach: (New Zealand) Steve Hansen

Note: Caps correct 1 June 2014

Player	Position	Date of birth (age)	Caps	Club/province
Dane Coles	Hooker	10 December 1986 (age 39)	15	Wellington / Hurricanes
Keven Mealamu	Hooker	20 March 1979 (age 47)	110	Auckland / Blues
Wyatt Crockett	Prop	24 January 1983 (age 43)	24	Canterbury / Crusaders
Charlie Faumuina	Prop	24 December 1986 (age 39)	17	Auckland / Blues
Ben Franks	Prop	27 March 1984 (age 42)	31	Hawke's Bay / Hurricanes
Owen Franks	Prop	23 December 1987 (age 38)	54	Canterbury / Crusaders
Tony Woodcock	Prop	27 January 1981 (age 45)	107	North Harbour / Highlanders
Dominic Bird	Lock	9 April 1991 (age 35)	1	Canterbury / Crusaders
Brodie Retallick	Lock	31 May 1991 (age 35)	24	Bay of Plenty / Chiefs
Patrick Tuipulotu	Lock	23 January 1993 (age 33)	0	Auckland / Blues
Sam Whitelock	Lock	12 October 1988 (age 38)	51	Canterbury / Crusaders
Sam Cane	Flanker	13 January 1992 (age 34)	14	Bay of Plenty / Chiefs
Richie McCaw (c)	Flanker	31 December 1980 (age 45)	124	Canterbury / Crusaders
Liam Messam	Flanker	25 March 1984 (age 42)	29	Waikato / Chiefs
Matt Todd	Flanker	24 March 1988 (age 38)	2	Canterbury / Crusaders
Victor Vito	Flanker	27 March 1987 (age 39)	22	Wellington / Hurricanes
Jerome Kaino	Number 8	6 April 1983 (age 43)	48	Auckland / Blues
Kieran Read	Number 8	26 October 1985 (age 41)	61	Canterbury / Crusaders
Tawera Kerr-Barlow	Half-back	15 August 1990 (age 36)	14	Waikato / Chiefs
TJ Perenara	Half-back	23 January 1992 (age 34)	0	Wellington / Hurricanes
Aaron Smith	Half-back	21 November 1988 (age 37)	26	Manawatu / Highlanders
Beauden Barrett	First five-eighth	27 May 1991 (age 35)	16	Taranaki / Hurricanes
Aaron Cruden	First five-eighth	8 January 1989 (age 37)	29	Manawatu / Chiefs
Colin Slade	First five-eighth	10 October 1987 (age 39)	11	Canterbury / Crusaders
Ryan Crotty	Centre	23 September 1988 (age 38)	5	Canterbury / Crusaders
Malakai Fekitoa	Centre	10 May 1992 (age 34)	0	Auckland / Highlanders
Ma'a Nonu	Centre	21 May 1982 (age 44)	88	Wellington / Blues
Conrad Smith	Centre	12 October 1981 (age 45)	75	Wellington / Hurricanes
Cory Jane	Wing	8 February 1983 (age 43)	45	Wellington / Hurricanes
Julian Savea	Wing	7 August 1990 (age 36)	20	Wellington / Hurricanes
Ben Smith	Wing	1 June 1986 (age 40)	26	Otago / Highlanders
Israel Dagg	Fullback	6 June 1988 (age 38)	38	Hawke's Bay / Crusaders

== Matches ==
=== Barbarians ===
1 June 2014
15:00 BST (UTC+01)

England	29–39	Barbarians
Try: Ewers 11' c Sharples 23' m Slade 55' m Con: Slade (1/2) 13'; Daly (0/1); Pen: Daly (1/1) 21'; Slade (3/3) 36', 61', 67'	Report	Try: Stanley 17' c Hernández 26' c Gorgodze 45' c Gear (2) 63' c, 76' m Con: James (3/3) 18', 28', 46'; Trinh-Duc (1/2) 64'; Pen: James (1/1) 51'; Trinh-Duc (1/1) 58'

Twickenham, London
Attendance: 50,498
Referee: Mathieu Raynal (France)

FB	15	Elliot Daly
RW	14	Semesa Rokoduguni
OC	13	Jonathan Joseph			(substituted off) 53'
IC	12	Sam Hill
LW	11	Charlie Sharples	(substituted off) 53'
FH	10	Henry Slade	18' to 28'
SH	9	Joe Simpson	(substituted off) 51'
N8	8	Dave Ewers			(substituted off) 72'
OF	7	Luke Wallace
BF	6	Jamie Gibson	(substituted off) 30'
RL	5	Graham Kitchener (c)
LL	4	Michael Paterson	(substituted off) 57'	(substituted on) 66'
TP	3	Kyle Sinckler	(substituted off) 51'
HK	2	Rob Buchanan	(substituted off) 46'	(substituted on) 64'
LP	1	Ross Harrison	(substituted off) 51'
Replacements:
HK	16	Tommy Taylor	(substituted on) 46'	(substituted off) 64'
PR	17	Fraser Balmain	(substituted on) 51'
PR	18	Will Collier	(substituted on) 51'
LK	19	Charlie Matthews	(substituted on) 57'	(substituted off) 66'	(substituted on) 72'
FL	20	James Gaskell	(substituted on) 30'
SH	21	Dan Robson	(substituted on) 51'
FH	22	Ollie Devoto	(substituted on) 18'	(substituted off) 28'	(substituted on) 53'
FB	23	Rob Miller	(substituted on) 53'
Coach:
(England) Jon Callard

FB	15	(Argentina) Juan Martín Hernández
RW	14	(New Zealand) Joe Rokocoko	(substituted off) 47'
OC	13	(New Zealand) Rene Ranger
IC	12	(New Zealand) Benson Stanley
LW	11	(New Zealand) Hosea Gear
FH	10	(Australia) Brock James	(substituted off) 52'
SH	9	(New Zealand) Jimmy Cowan	(substituted off) 47'	(substituted on) 66'
N8	8	(Georgia (country)) Mamuka Gorgodze
OF	7	(France) Alexandre Lapandry	(substituted off) 55'
BF	6	(Argentina) Juan Manuel Leguizamón (c)
RL	5	(South Africa) Juandré Kruger
LL	4	(Ireland) Donncha O'Callaghan	(substituted off) 52'
TP	3	(Georgia (country)) Davit Zirakashvili	(substituted off) 74'
HK	2	(Samoa) Ti’i Paulo	(substituted off) 64'
LP	1	(Tonga) Sona Taumalolo	(substituted off) 47'
Replacements:
HK	16	(New Zealand) Andrew Hore	(substituted on) 64'
PR	17	(France) Julien Brugnaut	(substituted on) 47'
PR	18	(Argentina) Nahuel Lobo	(substituted on) 74'
LK	19	(Samoa) Joe Tekori	(substituted on) 52'
N8	20	(Ireland) Roger Wilson	(substituted on) 55'
SH	21	(Argentina) Tomás Cubelli	(substituted on) 47'	(substituted off) 66'
FH	22	(France) François Trinh-Duc	(substituted on) 52'
CE	23	(New Zealand) Anthony Tuitavake	(substituted on) 47'
Coach:
(England) Dean Ryan

Man of the Match:
(New Zealand) Hosea Gear (Barbarians)

Touch judges:
Neil Hennessey (Wales)
Ben Whitehouse (Wales)
Television match official:
Gareth Simmonds (Wales)

Notes:

- Jon Callard coached England, with Lancaster in New Zealand with the touring 30-man squad.
- This was the Barbarians first back to back win since their back to back wins over England and Wales in 2011, which was the last time the Baa Baas beat England.

=== First test ===
7 June 2014
19:35 NZST (UTC+12)

New Zealand	20–15	England
Try: C. Smith 77' m Con: Cruden (0/1); Pen: Cruden (5/5) 9', 24', 38', 66', 70'	Report	Pen: Burns (4/4) 2', 18', 21', 63'; Cipriani (1/1) 73'

Eden Park, Auckland
Attendance: 47,195
Referee: Nigel Owens (Wales)

FB	15	Israel Dagg	(substituted off) 54'
RW	14	Ben Smith
OC	13	Conrad Smith
IC	12	Ma'a Nonu	(substituted off) 59'
LW	11	Cory Jane
FH	10	Aaron Cruden
SH	9	Aaron Smith	(substituted off) 70'
N8	8	Jerome Kaino
OF	7	Richie McCaw (c)
BF	6	Liam Messam	(substituted off) 71'
RL	5	Sam Whitelock
LL	4	Brodie Retallick
TP	3	Owen Franks	(substituted off) 54'
HK	2	Dane Coles	(substituted off) 59'
LP	1	Tony Woodcock	(substituted off) 59'
Replacements:
HK	16	Keven Mealamu	(substituted on) 59'
PR	17	Wyatt Crockett	(substituted on) 59'
PR	18	Charlie Faumuina	(substituted on) 54'
LK	19	Patrick Tuipulotu
FL	20	Victor Vito	(substituted on) 71'
SH	21	TJ Perenara	(substituted on) 70'
FH	22	Beauden Barrett	(substituted on) 54'
CE	23	Malakai Fekitoa	(substituted on) 59'
Coach:
(New Zealand) Steve Hansen

FB	15	Mike Brown
RW	14	Marland Yarde	(yellow card) 69' to 79'
OC	13	Manu Tuilagi
IC	12	Kyle Eastmond
LW	11	Jonny May		(substituted off) 79'
FH	10	Freddie Burns		(substituted off) 71'
SH	9	Ben Youngs		(substituted off) 79'
N8	8	Ben Morgan
OF	7	Chris Robshaw (c)
BF	6	James Haskell		(substituted off) 70'
RL	5	Geoff Parling
LL	4	Joe Launchbury		(substituted off) 70'
TP	3	David Wilson		(substituted off) 70'
HK	2	Rob Webber		(substituted off) 70'
LP	1	Joe Marler
Replacements:
HK	16	Joe Gray		(substituted on) 70'
PR	17	Matt Mullan
PR	18	Henry Thomas		(substituted on) 70'
LK	19	Dave Attwood		(substituted on) 70'
FL	20	Tom Johnson		(substituted on) 70'
SH	21	Lee Dickson		(substituted on) 79'
FH	22	Danny Cipriani		(substituted on) 71'
FB	23	Chris Pennell		(substituted on) 79'
Coach:
(England) Stuart Lancaster

Man of the Match:
Conrad Smith (New Zealand)

Touch judges:
Jaco Peyper (South Africa)
Jérôme Garcès (France)
Television match official:
George Ayoub (Australia)

Notes:

- Malakai Fekitoa and TJ Perenara made their international debuts for New Zealand.
- Chris Pennell and Joe Gray made their international debuts for England.
- With this win, New Zealand win 31 consecutive home matches, a world record by a test team.

=== Second test ===
14 June 2014
19:35 NZST (UTC+12)

New Zealand	28–27	England
Try: B. Smith 43' c Savea 49' m Nonu 63' c Con: Cruden (1/2) 44'; Barrett (1/1) 65'; Pen: Cruden (2/3) 11', 40'; Barrett (1/2) 59'	Report	Try: Yarde 7' c Brown 71' c Ashton 80'+1 c Con: Farrell (3/3) 8', 71', 80'+2; Pen: Farrell (2/3) 2', 47'

Forsyth Barr Stadium, Dunedin
Referee: Jaco Peyper (South Africa)

FB	15	Ben Smith
RW	14	Cory Jane
OC	13	Conrad Smith
IC	12	Ma'a Nonu
LW	11	Julian Savea
FH	10	Aaron Cruden	(substituted off) 50'
SH	9	Aaron Smith	(substituted off) 76'
N8	8	Jerome Kaino
OF	7	Richie McCaw (c)
BF	6	Liam Messam	(substituted off) 65'
RL	5	Sam Whitelock
LL	4	Brodie Retallick	(substituted off) 76'
TP	3	Owen Franks	(substituted off) 65'
HK	2	Dane Coles	(substituted off) 59'
LP	1	Tony Woodcock	(substituted off) 65'
Replacements:
HK	16	Keven Mealamu	(substituted on) 59'
PR	17	Wyatt Crockett	(substituted on) 65'
PR	18	Charlie Faumuina	(substituted on) 65'
LK	19	Patrick Tuipulotu	(substituted on) 76'
FL	20	Victor Vito	(substituted on) 65'
SH	21	TJ Perenara	(substituted on) 76'
FH	22	Beauden Barrett	(substituted on) 50'
CE	23	Malakai Fekitoa
Coach:
(New Zealand) Steve Hansen

FB	15	Mike Brown
RW	14	Manu Tuilagi
OC	13	Luther Burrell		(substituted off) 74'
IC	12	Billy Twelvetrees
LW	11	Marland Yarde
FH	10	Owen Farrell	(yellow card) 58' to 68'
SH	9	Danny Care		(substituted off) 71'
N8	8	Ben Morgan
OF	7	Chris Robshaw (c)
BF	6	Tom Wood		(substituted off) 56'
RL	5	Geoff Parling
LL	4	Joe Launchbury		(substituted off) 56'
TP	3	David Wilson		(substituted off) 76'
HK	2	Rob Webber		(substituted off) 47'
LP	1	Joe Marler		(substituted off) 71'
Replacements:
HK	16	Dylan Hartley		(substituted on) 47'
PR	17	Matt Mullan		(substituted on) 71'
PR	18	Kieran Brookes		(substituted on) 76'
LK	19	Courtney Lawes		(substituted on) 56'
N8	20	Billy Vunipola		(substituted on) 56'
SH	21	Ben Youngs		(substituted on) 71'
FH	22	Freddie Burns
WG	23	Chris Ashton		(substituted on) 74'
Coach:
(England) Stuart Lancaster

Man of the Match:
Ben Smith (New Zealand)

Touch judges:
Nigel Owens (Wales)
Jérôme Garcès (France)
Television match official:
George Ayoub (Australia)

Notes:

- Jerome Kaino earned his 50th test cap for New Zealand.
- Patrick Tuipulotu made his international debut for New Zealand.
- Kieran Brookes made his international debut for England.
- New Zealand retain the Hillary Shield, the fifth time they have held the trophy.

=== Crusaders ===
17 June 2014
19:35 NZST (UTC+12)

Crusaders (New Zealand)	7–38	England
Try: Todd 21' c Con: Taylor (1/1) 23'	Report	Try: Gray 1' c Foden 6' m Barritt 28' c Goode 33' c Watson 58' c Pennell 80' m Con: Cipriani (3/4) 2', 30', 35'; Myler (1/2) 59'

AMI Stadium, Christchurch
Referee: Nigel Owens (Wales)

FB	15	(New Zealand) Tom Taylor
RW	14	(New Zealand) Johnny McNicholl
OC	13	(Samoa) Rey Lee-Lo	(substituted off) 67'
IC	12	(New Zealand) Kieron Fonotia	(substituted off) 50'
LW	11	(New Zealand) Nafi Tuitavake
FH	10	(New Zealand) Tyler Bleyendaal
SH	9	(New Zealand) Willi Heinz	(substituted off) 50'
N8	8	(New Zealand) Luke Whitelock
OF	7	(New Zealand) George Whitelock (c)	(substituted off) 18'
BF	6	(New Zealand) Jordan Taufua
RL	5	(New Zealand) Joel Everson
LL	4	(New Zealand) Jimmy Tupou	(substituted off) 30'
TP	3	(New Zealand) Nepo Laulala	(substituted off) 76'
HK	2	(New Zealand) Corey Flynn	(substituted off) 56'
LP	1	(New Zealand) Tim Perry	(substituted off) 56'
Replacements:
HK	16	(New Zealand) Ben Funnell	(substituted on) 56'
PR	17	(New Zealand) Joe Moody	(substituted on) 56'
PR	18	(Tonga) Siate Tokolahi	(substituted on) 76'
LK	19	(New Zealand) Scott Barrett	(substituted on) 30'
FL	20	(New Zealand) Matt Todd	(substituted on) 18'
SH	21	(New Zealand) Andrew Ellis	(substituted on) 50'
CE	22	(New Zealand) Adam Whitelock	(substituted on) 50'
WG	23	(New Zealand) Rob Thompson	(substituted on) 67'
Coach:
(New Zealand) Todd Blackadder

FB	15	Alex Goode	(substituted off) 56'
RW	14	Ben Foden
OC	13	Henry Trinder	(substituted off) 56'
IC	12	Brad Barritt
LW	11	Anthony Watson
FH	10	Danny Cipriani	(substituted off) 47'
SH	9	Lee Dickson	(substituted off) 47'
N8	8	Tom Johnson
OF	7	Matt Kvesic
BF	6	James Haskell
RL	5	Dave Attwood	(substituted off) 67'
LL	4	Ed Slater (c)
TP	3	Henry Thomas	(substituted off) 56'
HK	2	Joe Gray	(substituted off) 59'
LP	1	Alex Waller	(substituted off) 56'
Replacements:
HK	16	Dave Ward	(substituted on) 59'
PR	17	Nathan Catt	(substituted on) 56'
PR	18	Kyle Sinckler	(substituted on) 56'
LK	19	Michael Paterson	(substituted on) 67'
SH	20	Richard Wigglesworth	(substituted on) 47'
FH	21	Stephen Myler	(substituted on) 47'
WG	22	Jonny May	(substituted on) 56'
FB	23	Chris Pennell	(substituted on) 56'
Coach:
(England) Stuart Lancaster

Touch judges:
Andrew Lees (Australia)
James Leckie (Australia)
Television match official:
George Ayoub (Australia)

=== Third test ===
21 June 2014
19:35 NZST (UTC+12)

New Zealand	36–13	England
Try: Savea (3) 3' m, 8' c, 80' c Smith (2) 26' c, 33' c Con: Cruden (3/4) 9', 27', 34'; Barrett (1/1) 80'; Pen: Cruden (1/1) 17'	Report	Try: Yarde 42' c Con: Burns (1/1) 43'; Pen: Burns (2/3) 7', 19'

Waikato Stadium, Hamilton
Referee: Jérôme Garcès (France)

FB	15	Ben Smith
RW	14	Cory Jane
OC	13	Malakai Fekitoa		(substituted off) 63'
IC	12	Ma'a Nonu
LW	11	Julian Savea
FH	10	Aaron Cruden		(substituted off) 44'
SH	9	Aaron Smith		(substituted off) 74'
N8	8	Kieran Read		(substituted off) 40'
OF	7	Richie McCaw (c)
BF	6	Jerome Kaino			(substituted off) 74'
RL	5	Sam Whitelock
LL	4	Brodie Retallick		(substituted off) 76'
TP	3	Owen Franks		(substituted off) 58'
HK	2	Dane Coles		(substituted off) 44'
LP	1	Tony Woodcock		(substituted off) 63'	(substituted on) 74'
Replacements:
HK	16	Keven Mealamu		(substituted on) 44'
PR	17	Wyatt Crockett	(yellow card) 72' to 80'	(substituted on) 63'
PR	18	Charlie Faumuina		(substituted on) 58'
LK	19	Patrick Tuipulotu		(substituted on) 76'
FL	20	Liam Messam		(substituted on) 40'
SH	21	TJ Perenara		(substituted on) 74'
FH	22	Beauden Barrett		(substituted on) 44'
CE	23	Ryan Crotty		(substituted on) 63'
Coach:
(New Zealand) Steve Hansen

FB	15	Mike Brown
RW	14	Chris Ashton
OC	13	Manu Tuilagi
IC	12	Kyle Eastmond		(substituted off) 40'
LW	11	Marland Yarde
FH	10	Freddie Burns		(substituted off) 59'
SH	9	Ben Youngs		(substituted off) 71'
N8	8	Billy Vunipola	(yellow card) 20' to 30'	(substituted off) 56'
OF	7	Chris Robshaw (c)
BF	6	Tom Wood
RL	5	Courtney Lawes
LL	4	Joe Launchbury		(substituted off) 21'	(substituted on) 28'	(substituted off) 65'
TP	3	David Wilson		(substituted off) 56'
HK	2	Dylan Hartley		(substituted off) 58'
LP	1	Joe Marler		(substituted off) 65'
Replacements:
HK	16	Rob Webber		(substituted on) 58'
PR	17	Matt Mullan		(substituted on) 65'
PR	18	Kieran Brookes		(substituted on) 56'
LK	19	Dave Attwood		(substituted on) 21'	(substituted off) 28'	(substituted on) 65'
N8	20	Ben Morgan		(substituted on) 56'
SH	21	Lee Dickson		(substituted on) 71'
FH	22	Danny Cipriani		(substituted on) 59'
CE	23	Luther Burrell		(substituted on) 40'
Coach:
(England) Stuart Lancaster

Man of the Match:
Julian Savea (New Zealand)

Touch judges:
Nigel Owens (Wales)
James Leckie (Australia)
Television match official:
George Ayoub (Australia)

== Statistics ==
Key

- Con: Conversions
- Pen: Penalties
- DG: Drop goals
- Pts: Points

=== Tour statistics ===
Name	Non-Test						Test						Overall						Cards
Name	Played	Tries	Con	Pen	DG	Pts	Played	Tries	Con	Pen	DG	Pts	Played	Tries	Con	Pen	DG	Pts	Temporarily suspended
Freddie Burns	–	–	–	–	–	0	2	0	1	6	0	20	2	0	1	6	0	20	–
Henry Slade	1	1	1	3	0	16	–	–	–	–	–	0	1	1	1	3	0	16	–
Owen Farrell	–	–	–	–	–	0	1	0	3	2	0	12	1	0	3	2	0	12	–
Marland Yarde	–	–	–	–	–	0	3	2	0	0	0	10	3	2	0	0	0	10	1
Danny Cipriani	1	0	3	0	0	6	2	0	0	1	0	3	3	0	3	1	0	9	–
Mike Brown	–	–	–	–	–	0	3	1	0	0	0	5	3	1	0	0	0	5	–
Chris Ashton	–	–	–	–	–	0	2	1	0	0	0	5	2	1	0	0	0	5	–
Joe Gray	1	1	0	0	0	5	1	0	0	0	0	0	2	1	0	0	0	5	–
Chris Pennell	1	1	0	0	0	5	1	0	0	0	0	0	2	1	0	0	0	5	–
Brad Barritt	1	1	0	0	0	5	–	–	–	–	–	0	1	1	0	0	0	5	–
Dave Ewers	1	1	0	0	0	5	–	–	–	–	–	0	1	1	0	0	0	5	–
Ben Foden	1	1	0	0	0	5	–	–	–	–	–	0	1	1	0	0	0	5	–
Alex Goode	1	1	0	0	0	5	–	–	–	–	–	0	1	1	0	0	0	5	–
Charlie Sharples	1	1	0	0	0	5	–	–	–	–	–	0	1	1	0	0	0	5	–
Anthony Watson	1	1	0	0	0	5	–	–	–	–	–	0	1	1	0	0	0	5	–
Elliot Daly	1	0	0	1	0	3	–	–	–	–	–	0	1	0	0	1	0	3	–
Stephen Myler	1	0	1	0	0	2	–	–	–	–	–	0	1	0	1	0	0	2	–
Dave Attwood	1	0	0	0	0	0	2	0	0	0	0	0	3	0	0	0	0	0	–
Lee Dickson	1	0	0	0	0	0	2	0	0	0	0	0	3	0	0	0	0	0	–
Joe Launchbury	–	–	–	–	–	0	3	0	0	0	0	0	3	0	0	0	0	0	–
Joe Marler	–	–	–	–	–	0	3	0	0	0	0	0	3	0	0	0	0	0	–
Ben Morgan	–	–	–	–	–	0	3	0	0	0	0	0	3	0	0	0	0	0	–
Chris Robshaw	–	–	–	–	–	0	3	0	0	0	0	0	3	0	0	0	0	0	–
Manu Tuilagi	–	–	–	–	–	0	3	0	0	0	0	0	3	0	0	0	0	0	–
David Wilson	–	–	–	–	–	0	3	0	0	0	0	0	3	0	0	0	0	0	–
Rob Webber	–	–	–	–	–	0	3	0	0	0	0	0	3	0	0	0	0	0	–
Ben Youngs	–	–	–	–	–	0	3	0	0	0	0	0	3	0	0	0	0	0	–
Kieran Brookes	–	–	–	–	–	0	2	0	0	0	0	0	2	0	0	0	0	0	–
Luther Burrell	–	–	–	–	–	0	2	0	0	0	0	0	2	0	0	0	0	0	–
Kyle Eastmond	–	–	–	–	–	0	2	0	0	0	0	0	2	0	0	0	0	0	–
Dylan Hartley	–	–	–	–	–	0	2	0	0	0	0	0	2	0	0	0	0	0	–
James Haskell	1	0	0	0	0	0	1	0	0	0	0	0	2	0	0	0	0	0	–
Tom Johnson	1	0	0	0	0	0	1	0	0	0	0	0	2	0	0	0	0	0	–
Courtney Lawes	–	–	–	–	–	0	2	0	0	0	0	0	2	0	0	0	0	0	–
Jonny May	1	0	0	0	0	0	1	0	0	0	0	0	2	0	0	0	0	0	–
Matt Mullan	–	–	–	–	–	0	2	0	0	0	0	0	2	0	0	0	0	0	–
Geoff Parling	–	–	–	–	–	0	2	0	0	0	0	0	2	0	0	0	0	0	–
Michael Paterson	2	0	0	0	0	0	–	–	–	–	–	0	2	0	0	0	0	0	–
Kyle Sinckler	2	0	0	0	0	0	–	–	–	–	–	0	2	0	0	0	0	0	–
Henry Thomas	1	0	0	0	0	0	1	0	0	0	0	0	2	0	0	0	0	0	–
Billy Vunipola	–	–	–	–	–	0	2	0	0	0	0	0	2	0	0	0	0	0	1
Tom Wood	–	–	–	–	–	0	2	0	0	0	0	0	2	0	0	0	0	0	–
Fraser Balmain	1	0	0	0	0	0	–	–	–	–	–	0	1	0	0	0	0	0	–
Rob Buchanan	1	0	0	0	0	0	–	–	–	–	–	0	1	0	0	0	0	0	–
Danny Care	–	–	–	–	–	0	1	0	0	0	0	0	1	0	0	0	0	0	–
Nathan Catt	1	0	0	0	0	0	–	–	–	–	–	0	1	0	0	0	0	0	–
Will Collier	1	0	0	0	0	0	–	–	–	–	–	0	1	0	0	0	0	0	–
Ollie Devoto	1	0	0	0	0	0	–	–	–	–	–	0	1	0	0	0	0	0	–
James Gaskell	1	0	0	0	0	0	–	–	–	–	–	0	1	0	0	0	0	0	–
Jamie Gibson	1	0	0	0	0	0	–	–	–	–	–	0	1	0	0	0	0	0	–
Ross Harrison	1	0	0	0	0	0	–	–	–	–	–	0	1	0	0	0	0	0	–
Sam Hill	1	0	0	0	0	0	–	–	–	–	–	0	1	0	0	0	0	0	–
Jonathan Joseph	1	0	0	0	0	0	–	–	–	–	–	0	1	0	0	0	0	0	–
Graham Kitchener	1	0	0	0	0	0	–	–	–	–	–	0	1	0	0	0	0	0	–
Matt Kvesic	1	0	0	0	0	0	–	–	–	–	–	0	1	0	0	0	0	0	–
Charlie Matthews	1	0	0	0	0	0	–	–	–	–	–	0	1	0	0	0	0	0	–
Rob Miller	1	0	0	0	0	0	–	–	–	–	–	0	1	0	0	0	0	0	–
Dan Robson	1	0	0	0	0	0	–	–	–	–	–	0	1	0	0	0	0	0	–
Semesa Rokoduguni	1	0	0	0	0	0	–	–	–	–	–	0	1	0	0	0	0	0	–
Joe Simpson	1	0	0	0	0	0	–	–	–	–	–	0	1	0	0	0	0	0	–
Ed Slater	1	0	0	0	0	0	–	–	–	–	–	0	1	0	0	0	0	0	–
Tommy Taylor	1	0	0	0	0	0	–	–	–	–	–	0	1	0	0	0	0	0	–
Henry Trinder	1	0	0	0	0	0	–	–	–	–	–	0	1	0	0	0	0	0	–
Billy Twelvetrees	–	–	–	–	–	0	1	0	0	0	0	0	1	0	0	0	0	0	–
Luke Wallace	1	0	0	0	0	0	–	–	–	–	–	0	1	0	0	0	0	0	–
Alex Waller	1	0	0	0	0	0	–	–	–	–	–	0	1	0	0	0	0	0	–
Dave Ward	1	0	0	0	0	0	–	–	–	–	–	0	1	0	0	0	0	0	–
Richard Wigglesworth	1	0	0	0	0	0	–	–	–	–	–	0	1	0	0	0	0	0	–
Luke Cowan-Dickie	–	–	–	–	–	0	–	–	–	–	–	0	–	–	–	–	–	0	–

=== Test series statistics ===
Name	Team	Tries	Con	Pen	DG	Pts
Aaron Cruden	New Zealand	0	4	8	0	32
Freddie Burns	England	0	1	6	0	20
Julian Savea	New Zealand	4	0	0	0	20
Owen Farrell	England	0	3	2	0	12
Aaron Smith	New Zealand	2	0	0	0	10
Marland Yarde	England	2	0	0	0	10
Beauden Barrett	New Zealand	0	2	1	0	7
Ma'a Nonu	New Zealand	1	0	0	0	5
Ben Smith	New Zealand	1	0	0	0	5
Conrad Smith	New Zealand	1	0	0	0	5
Chris Ashton	England	1	0	0	0	5
Mike Brown	England	1	0	0	0	5
Danny Cipriani	England	0	0	1	0	3

== See also ==
- 2014 mid-year rugby union tests
- History of rugby union matches between England and New Zealand
