= Dave Ward (rugby union) =

English rugby union player

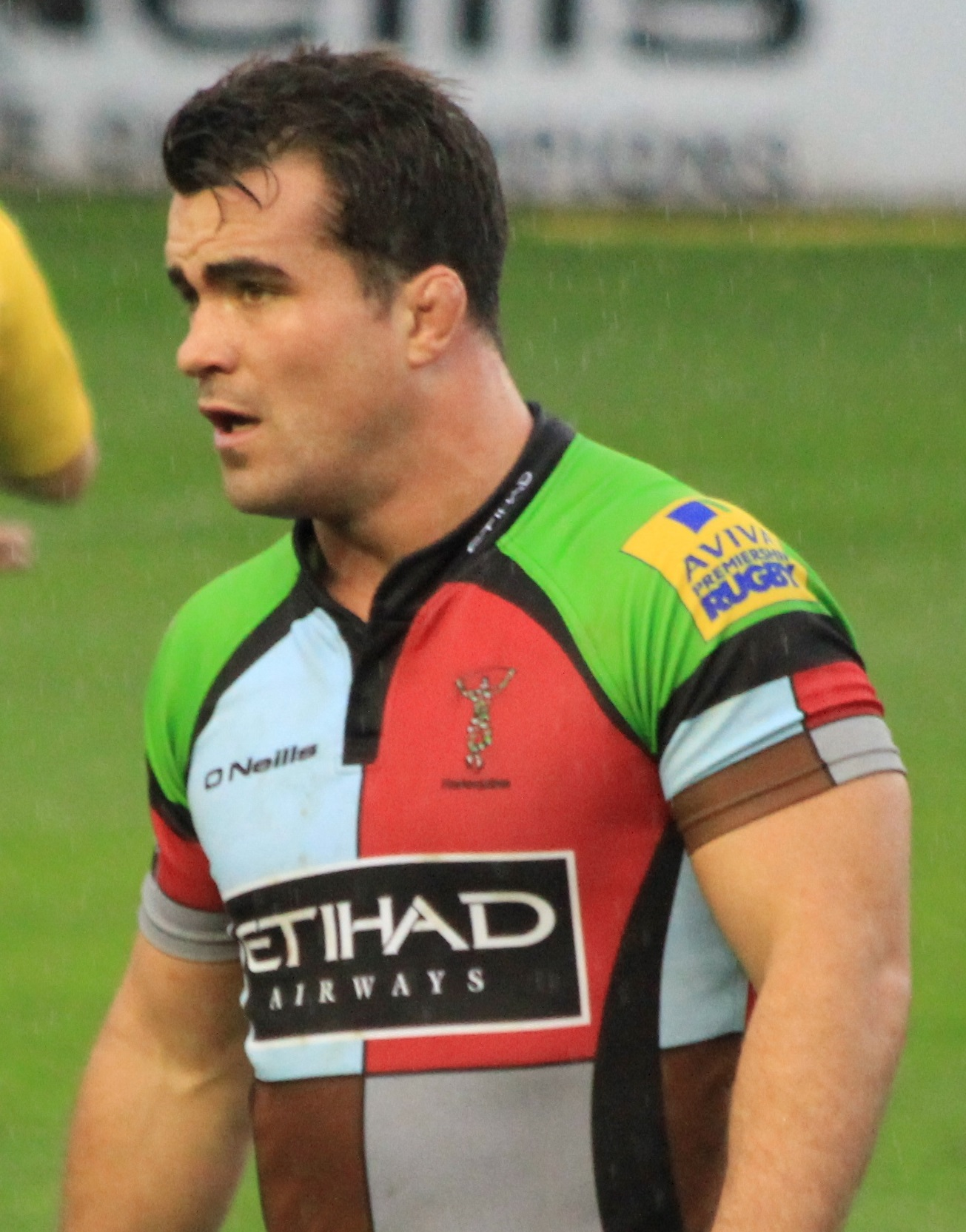
- Ward in action for Harlequins in 2013
- Born: David Patrick Ward; 21 May 1985 (age 41) Bath, England
- Height: 1.80 m (5 ft 11 in)
- Weight: 100 kg (15 st 10 lb; 220 lb)

Rugby union career
- Position: Hooker/Flanker
Senior career
Years	Team	Apps	(Points)
2004–2007	Bath Rugby	8	(0)
2007–2008	Northampton Saints	6	(20)
2008–2009	Sale Sharks	3	(0)
2009–2012	Cornish Pirates	110	(120)
2012–2019	Harlequins	167	(45)
2019–2020	Ampthill		
- Correct as of 26 June 2014
International career
Years	Team	Apps	(Points)
- England U18
- England U21
2014–	England Saxons	2	(0)
- Correct as of 26 June 2014
Coaching career
- Years: Team
- 2021–2025: Bristol Bears Women

David Patrick Ward (born 21 May 1985) is an English rugby union player for Premiership side Harlequins, and Head Coach of Bristol Bears Women. A hooker, Ward has previously played for Ampthill RUFC, Sale Sharks, Northampton Saints, Bath Rugby and the Cornish Pirates. At international level he has represented the England under-18s, under-21s and Saxons.

== Club career ==
Born in Bath, Ward joined his local club Bath Rugby as a six-year-old, progressing all the way through to the first team for whom he made his debut as a replacement in the Heineken Cup against Treviso in December 2004. His first start came a month later against Leinster Rugby and despite Bath losing, he was named as the Man of the Match. He made just six more appearances for the club over the next two years, and, after finding himself as fourth choice hooker, joined Northampton Saints on a two-year contract in 2007.

He made six appearances for Saints in their 2007–08 promotion winning season, scoring four tries, but was released from his contract by the club a year early in October 2008. Days later he joined Sale Sharks, though he again failed to secure regular playing time, making just three appearances during the 2008–09 season. During his time with Sale the club received a one-point deduction after he came off the bench against Harlequins prior to being re-registered following a loan spell at Manchester.

He time at Sale was hampered by injury and after only one season, Ward joined Championship club Cornish Pirates in Summer 2009. He turned down a part-time contract from Pertemps Bees alongside a sales job in favour of the Pirates and later revealed that he had contemplated retirement prior to the move. He made his competitive debut against Nottingham in September 2009 and went on to make 33 appearances in his first season. He was ever-present in the two following years, racking up 110 appearances in his three years at the club.

In April 2012 he returned to the Premiership after signing a contract with Harlequins for the 2012–13 season. His first season at The Stoop followed a similar pattern to his spells with Bath, Saints and Sale, with Ward making only seven appearances, five of which came in the Anglo-Welsh Cup. His Premiership breakthrough came in 2013–14 at the age of 28 where, following injuries to regular hookers Joe Gray and Rob Buchanan, he made 31 appearances, including his first Premiership start for seven years. Over the course of the campaign he earned five Man of the Match awards and was voted the Players' Player of the Season.

== International career ==
Ward first represented England at under-18 and under-21 level. In January 2014 he was rewarded for his club form with a call up to the England Saxons squad for two games against Scotland the Ireland Wolfhounds. He started the first game which ended in a 16–16 draw and came off the bench as the second ended in a 14–8 defeat. Four months later he was included in England's senior squad for the three Test summer tour of New Zealand. Though he was not included in the matchday 23 for any of the Tests, he was a second-half replacement in the tour game against the Crusaders which England won 38–7.

== Personal life ==
In August 2020 Ward married Harlequins and England player Abbie Scott.
