= Marland Yarde =

England international rugby union player (born 1992)

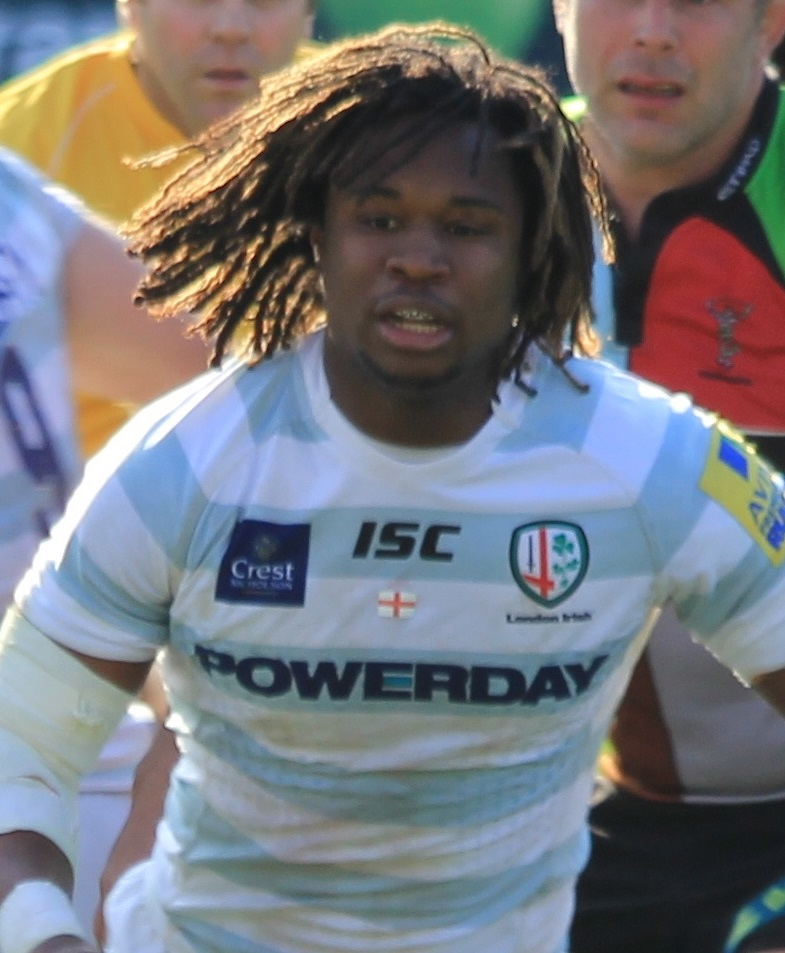
- Yarde playing for London Irish in 2014
- Born: 20 April 1992 (age 34) Castries, Saint Lucia
- Height: 1.83 m (6 ft 0 in)
- Weight: 99 kg (15 st 8 lb; 218 lb)
- School: Gunnersbury Boys' School; Whitgift School

Rugby union career
- Position: Wing
Senior career
| Years | Team | Apps | (Points) |
| 2010–2014 | London Irish | 47 | (100) |
| 2014–2017 | Harlequins | 80 | (135) |
| 2017–2022 | Sale Sharks | 75 | (155) |
| 2022–2023 | Bayonne | 6 | (0) |
International career
| Years | Team | Apps | (Points) |
- England U16
- England U18
| 2011–2012 | England U20 | 15 | (45) |
| 2013– | England | 13 | (40) |

Marland Yarde (born 20 April 1992) is an English rugby union wing who currently plays for Bayonne. He has previously played for London Irish, Harlequins and Sale Sharks. At international level Yarde won 13 caps for England between 2013 and 2017.

== Early life ==
Born in Castries, Saint Lucia, Yarde moved to England as a nine-year-old with his mother. He came through the England age-group teams after taking up rugby at 14 having originally played football with the Queens Park Rangers Academy. He then earned a scholarship to Whitgift School in South Croydon. While at Whitgift Yarde scored a hat-trick of tries in the Daily Mail RBS Schools Under 18 Cup final as they beat RGS Newcastle 34-10.

== Club career ==
Marland returned to London Irish from being on loan to London Welsh, ready for the 2010 season. In his debut season, Marland made one appearance for the Irish, against Sale Sharks, He started at wing and in his debut match he scored a try. This wasn't enough to force his way through to the main team. The following season was an improvement, where he appeared for Irish a further 9 times, but his only tries came in the 52-point demolition of Gloucester, when he came on as a replacement to score two tries.

In January 2014, he signed a two-year contract to join Harlequins for the 2014–15 season. He finished his spell at Irish on a high note, scoring 20 points in his final two games including a hat trick against Gloucester Rugby. In late October 2017, Harlequins Director of Rugby reported that Yarde missed three training sessions and was probably going to join another club. On 1 November 2017, it was announced that Yarde would join Sale Sharks. After Yarde's departure from Harlequins former teammate Chris Robshaw stated that "I am disappointed in him. Marland has unfortunately run out of lives and for us as a club we are going to be in a better place now."

In September 2022, Yarde posted a statement on social media confirming that he had been arrested in January of that year but that he had subsequently been released without charge. Sale Sharks director of rugby Alex Sanderson later confirmed that he had left the club via mutual consent prior to the 2021-22 Premiership Rugby season.

Yarde was named as part of the Barbarians squad which would play Harlequins on the 17 November 2022. Harlequins beat the Barbarians 73-28.

On 24 December 2022, Top 14 side Bayonne announced that Yarde had signed for the club until the end of the 2022/23 season.

== International career ==
Yarde won his first England cap on 15 June 2013, against Argentina in the second Test of their summer tour. Named in the starting XV, he scored two tries in their record 51–26 victory. He retained his place for the first Autumn International of 2013 against Australia which England won 20–13, though he missed the two other games against Argentina and New Zealand through injury.

A torn hip tendon sustained in London Irish's game against Leicester Tigers meant that he played no part in the 2014 Six Nations, though he did return to the training squad for the last two games against Wales and Italy. He was selected for the 2014 summer tour to New Zealand and started in all three tests, scoring two tries.

=== International tries ===
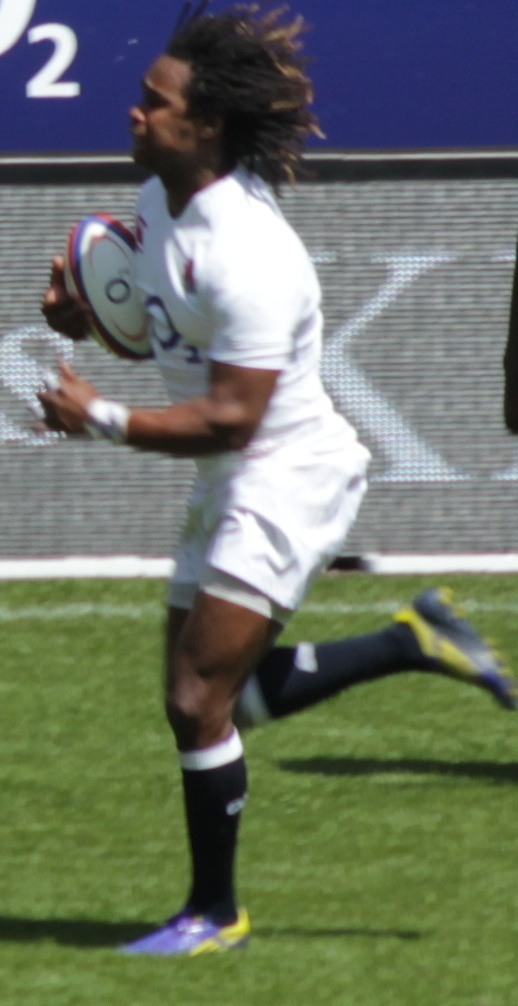
Yarde playing for England against the Barbarians in 2013.

As of 7 July 2019

| Try | Opposing team | Location | Venue | Competition | Date | Result | Score |
|---|---|---|---|---|---|---|---|
| 1 | Argentina | Buenos Aires, Argentina | José Amalfitani Stadium | 2013 Summer Internationals | 15 June 2013 | Win | 26 – 51 |
| 2 | Argentina | Buenos Aires, Argentina | José Amalfitani Stadium | 2013 Summer Internationals | 15 June 2013 | Win | 26 – 51 |
| 3 | New Zealand | Dunedin, New Zealand | Forsyth Barr Stadium | 2014 Tour of New Zealand | 14 June 2014 | Loss | 28 – 27 |
| 4 | New Zealand | Hamilton, New Zealand | Waikato Stadium | 2014 Tour of New Zealand | 21 June 2014 | Loss | 36 – 13 |
| 5 | Wales | London, England | Twickenham Stadium | 2016 Summer Tour Warm-Up | 29 May 2016 | Win | 27 – 13 |
| 6 | Australia | Brisbane, Australia | Suncorp Stadium | 2016 Summer Internationals | 11 June 2016 | Win | 28 – 39 |
| 7 | Australia | London, England | Twickenham Stadium | 2016 Autumn Internationals | 3 December 2016 | Win | 37 – 21 |
| 8 | Argentina | San Juan, Argentina | Estadio Bicentenario | 2017 Tour of Argentina | 10 June 2017 | Win | 34 – 38 |
