= Matt Kvesic =

England international rugby union player

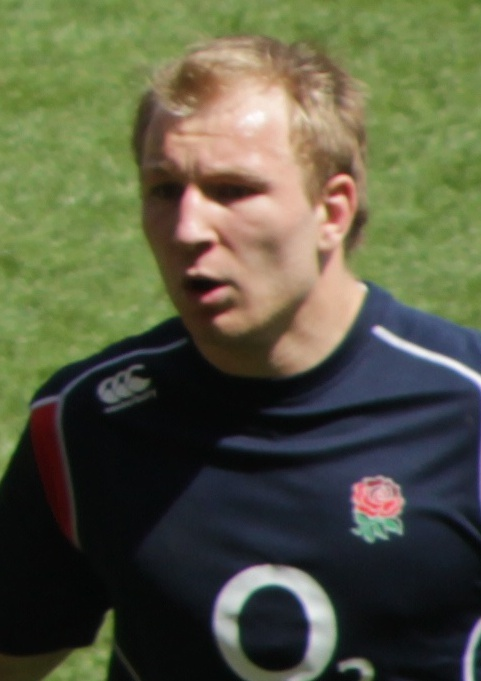
- Kvesic warming up for England in 2013
- Born: Matthew Boris Kvesic; 14 April 1992 (age 34) Iserlohn, Germany
- Height: 1.88 m (6 ft 2 in)
- Weight: 105 kg (16 st 7 lb)
- School: Blundell's School; Worcester Sixth Form College

Rugby union career
- Position: Openside flanker
Senior career
Years	Team	Apps	(Points)
2009–2013	Worcester Warriors	59	(50)
2010	→ Stourbridge (loan)	4	(0)
2013−2017	Gloucester Rugby	98	(50)
2017−2020	Exeter Chiefs	58	(65)
2020–2022	Worcester Warriors	40	(65)
2022–2023	Zebre Parma	12	(5)
2023−2025	Coventry	35	(30)
2025-	Worcester Warriors		
- Correct as of 24 Dec 2022
International career
Years	Team	Apps	(Points)
2008	England U16		
2009–2010	England U18		
2011–2012	England U20	14	(15)
2016	England Saxons	3	(5)
2013−2019	England	4	(0)
- Correct as of 17 June 2016

Matthew Boris "Matt" Kvesic (born 14 April 1992) is an English professional rugby union player for Worcester Warriors. Born in Iserlohn, Germany, to English parents of Croatian and Polish roots, he represented England at international level and played for several youth representative sides before making his debut for the senior team in 2013. Predominantly an openside flanker, he has also played on the blindside flanker and at number eight.

== Early life and youth rugby ==
After taking up rugby at Swanage & Wareham RFC, Kvesic attended Blundell's School in Tiverton where he captained the team in schools rugby. He joined the Worcester Warriors Academy aged 14 after attending a training camp before completing his academic studies at Worcester Sixth Form College. Whilst in Sixth form he also represented North Midlands and then the Midlands as a whole in the Midland's Under-18 Championship and Divisional Festival respectively.

== Club career ==
Kvesic made his senior debut for Worcester in the Anglo-Welsh Cup against the Scarlets on 14 November 2009, becoming the youngest player to represent the Warriors in the professional era. In May 2010 he signed a new contract with the club, though with his playing time limited, he joined National League 1 side Stourbridge at the start of the season on a dual registration agreement, making four appearances.

He returned to Worcester and scored two tries on his full debut against Esher before adding a third in the British and Irish Cup against Newport in his next game. He credited his try-scoring start to the season with the time he spent playing physical, forwards dominated rugby in National League 1 with Stourbridge and finished the season with 13 appearances as Worcester were promoted to the Premiership. His performances saw him named Young Player of the Year at the club's end-of-season awards and, with his previous contract due to run out in 2012, he signed an extension with the club in April 2011. In his first Premiership season he played sixteen times in the league, including eight starts, and made his European debut in the Amlin Challenge Cup against Stade Français on 10 November 2011. He was a regular in his final season with the Warriors, appearing in all but one of their Premiership matches and left the club having been named Player of the Year and Players' Player of the Year for 2012–13.

On 6 February 2013, it was confirmed that Kvesic would leave Worcester at the end of the season to join local rivals Gloucester Rugby on a two-year contract. He made his debut in Gloucester's 22–16 defeat to Sale Sharks on the opening day of the 2013–14 season and played his first match in the Heineken Cup a month later against USA Perpignan. After twenty games without a try, Kvesic scored his first points for the club after crossing the line against Harlequins in February 2014. In October 2014, he signed a two-year contract extension to keep him with the club until the end of the 2016–17 season.

On 12 January 2017 it was announced that Kvesic would leave Gloucester at the end of the season to join local rivals Exeter Chiefs on a three-year contract.

On 13 May 2020, Kvesic left Exeter to rejoin Worcester Warriors ahead of the 2020–21 season, on a long-term deal.

On 5 October 2022 all Worcester players had their contacts terminated due to the liquidation of the company to which they were contracted. On 16 November 2022, it was confirmed that Kvesic has signed for Italy region Zebre Parma in the URC for the rest of the 2022–23 season.

After his stint in Italy with Zebre Parma, Kvesic returned to England to join Coventry in the second-tier RFU Championship from the 2023-24 season.

On 14 May 2025, Kvesic was announced as the first signing to his home club Worcester Warriors, who return to professional rugby after entered administration, back in the RFU Championship from the 2025-26 season.

== International career ==
=== Age group rugby ===
Kvesic first represented England at under-16 level in 2008 while still at Blundell's school. He made his debut for the under-18s the following year in the European Under-18 Rugby Union Championship and became a regular in the team. His spell with the under-18s culminated with a Grand Slam in the Five Nations tournament with Kvesic captaining the side in the win over Scotland. In September 2010 he was selected in the under-20 elite squad and retained his place for the 2011 Six Nations Under 20s Championship and Junior World Championship. He made his debut against Wales in February 2011, scoring two tries in a 26–20 win and went on to play every game of the Under-20s Six Nations as England won the Grand Slam. He cemented his place in the back row and started 14 of England's 15 games in the 13 months after his debut, playing in the Junior World Championship final defeat to New Zealand and the 2012 Under-20s Six Nations as England retained their title.

=== Senior team ===
A shoulder injury prevented Kvesic from playing in the 2012 Junior World Championship though he was named in the England Saxons squad for the first time in June the same year. In January 2013 he called into the Senior squad for the Six Nations after an injury to Tom Johnson but did not make any appearances. He was included in the squad for the 2013 tour of Argentina and started in the uncapped game against the Barbarians at Twickenham as England ran out 40–12 winners. On 8 June he won his first senior cap in the 32–3 win over Argentina in the first Test and retained his place for the second match which England also won 51–26. After impressing during the tour he was named in the Elite Player Squad in August.

As part of the EPS, Kvesic was included in the squad for the 2014 Six Nations though he was not selected in the matchday 23 for any of the games. He travelled on the 2014 summer tour to New Zealand but was again omitted from the squad for any of the Test matches due to the stiff competition for the three back row slots. He did however play in the midweek game against the Crusaders, starting on the openside as England scored six tries in a 38–7 victory. After the game England head coach Stuart Lancaster praised his performance, naming him as his Man of the Match.

Despite being called up in Eddie Jones first EPS squad in 2016, Kvesic has endured a long stay in the international wilderness, however after an outstanding second season for the Exeter Chiefs developing into more an all-round flanker rather than just an out-and-out openside he was recalled to the England squad for the 2019 Rugby World Cup warm-ups and came off the bench in the final game against Italy to win his third cap but was not included in the World Cup squad.

== Honours ==
Worcester Warriors

- Young Player of the Year: 2010–11
- Players' Player of the Year: 2012–13
- Player of the Year: 2012–13

Gloucester Rugby

- European Challenge Cup 2014–15
- Player of the Year 2014–15
- Young Player of the Year 2014–15
- Players' Player of the Year 2014–15
- Young Player of the Year 2015–16
- Player of the Year 2015–16

Exeter Chiefs

- Player of the Year 2018–19
- Premiership team of the season 2018–19

== Personal life ==
Kvesic was born in Iserlohn, Germany, where his father was posted with the British Army. He is of Croatian descent on his father's side Mark Kvesic and Polish on his mother's Julia Kvesic.
