= Ethan Waller =

English rugby union player

- Born: Ethan Charles A. Waller; 13 August 1992 (age 34) Kettering, England
- Height: 1.83 m (6 ft 0 in)
- Weight: 119 kg (18 st 10 lb)
- School: Wellingborough School
- Notable relative: Alex Waller (brother)

Rugby union career
- Position: Loosehead Prop
Senior career
Years	Team	Apps	(Points)
2012–2017	Northampton Saints	95	(20)
2011–2012	→ Coventry	20	(25)
2012–2013	→ Moseley	12	(5)
2017–2022	Worcester Warriors	76	(10)
2022–2024	Northampton Saints	31	(5)
- Correct as of 29 Nov 2025

Ethan Charles A. Waller (born 13 August 1992) is an English rugby union prop who last played for Northampton Saints in 2024. came through the Northampton Saints academy system and made his debut in November 2012 against Harlequins and is the younger brother of Saints prop Alex. He has previously spent time at Coventry and Moseley on dual registration agreements.

The young prop's breakthrough season came in 2013/14 while Saints Alex Corbisiero was unavailable due to injury. Pushing his brother, Alex, for the number one shirt at the club in his later years at Saints, Ethan made 95 appearances in a Saints shirt and featured in some of the club's biggest games.

Making a large impact off the pitch with the fans, Waller hosted many charity events while at Saints, including writing a Christmas Pantomime two years running, in which the whole squad performed.

The young prop also helped Saints' second side the Northampton Wanderers lift the Aviva 'A' League trophy in 2016/17, beating Gloucester United in the final at Franklin's Gardens.

It was announced on 19 January 2017 that Waller would leave his first club Saints and join fellow Aviva Premiership side Worcester Warriors for the 2017/18 campaign.
