= Alex Waller =

English rugby union player

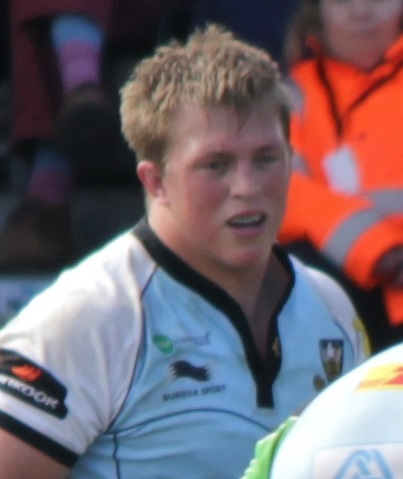
- Waller playing for Northampton Saints in 2013
- Born: Alexander Marshall Waller; 14 February 1990 (age 36) Kettering, England
- Height: 1.85 m (6 ft 1 in)
- Weight: 118 kg (18 st 8 lb)
- School: Wellingborough School
- Notable relative: Ethan Waller (brother)

Rugby union career
- Position: Prop
Senior career
Years	Team	Apps	(Points)
2009–2024	Northampton Saints	370	(110)
- Correct as of 8 June 2024
International career
Years	Team	Apps	(Points)
2014–2015	England A	3	(0)
2015	England XV	1	(0)
- Correct as of 7 June 2017

Alexander Marshall Waller (born 14 February 1990) is an English former rugby union player who played as a prop for his whole career with Northampton Saints.

== Club career ==
Born in Kettering, Waller is a product of the Northampton Saints Academy and made his debut in November 2009 against Ospreys. Waller came off the bench as a substitute replacement for Soane Tongaʻuiha in the 2011 Heineken Cup final at the Millennium Stadium which they lost against Leinster to finish runners up.

Waller soon established himself in the Saints' first team and featured in their double winning season five years after his first run out in a Saints shirt. The young prop came off the bench as a substitute in the 2013–14 European Challenge Cup final which saw Northampton beat Bath at Cardiff Arms Park to lift the trophy. A week later Waller scored the winning try in extra time of the Premiership final as Northampton defeated Saracens at Twickenham to become league champions for the first time in their history.

Waller helped Northampton secure European Champions Cup rugby for 2017–18 as Saints beat Stade Français in the European Champions Cup play-off final to claim the last spot in the top-tier of Europe for the following season. Waller became a regular fixture in the Saints team and in the 2017–18 campaign racked up his 150th consecutive appearance in the Premiership to take the record for the most consecutive appearances in the league’s history. He also turned out for his 200th appearance in a Saints shirt that season.

In August 2018 Waller was named club co-captain. That season he captained the Northampton side that won the Premiership Rugby Cup.

Waller played in their 2023–24 European Rugby Champions Cup semi-final elimination against Leinster. The following month he started in the 2024 Premiership final which saw Northampton defeat Bath to become league champions for the first time in a decade. Ultimately this was his last game as he retired from rugby at the end of that season.

== International career ==
In January 2014, Waller was named as an injury replacement in the England A squad for the game against Ireland Wolfhounds. The call up marked his first inclusion in any of England's representative teams. He made his debut in the match as England slipped to a 14–8 defeat, and earned a second cap the following week in a draw against Scotland A.

In May 2014, Waller was among a group of 16 players called up after the Premiership Final to join up with the senior England squad for their three Test summer tour of New Zealand.

Waller was named on the bench for a non-capped England XV game against the Barbarians at Twickenham on 31 May 2015.

== Honours ==
Northampton Saints

- Premiership winner: 2013–2014, 2023–2024
- EPCR Challenge Cup winner: 2013–2014
- Premiership Rugby Cup winner: 2018–2019
- European Rugby Champions Cup runner-up: 2010–2011
