= History of rugby union matches between England and New Zealand =

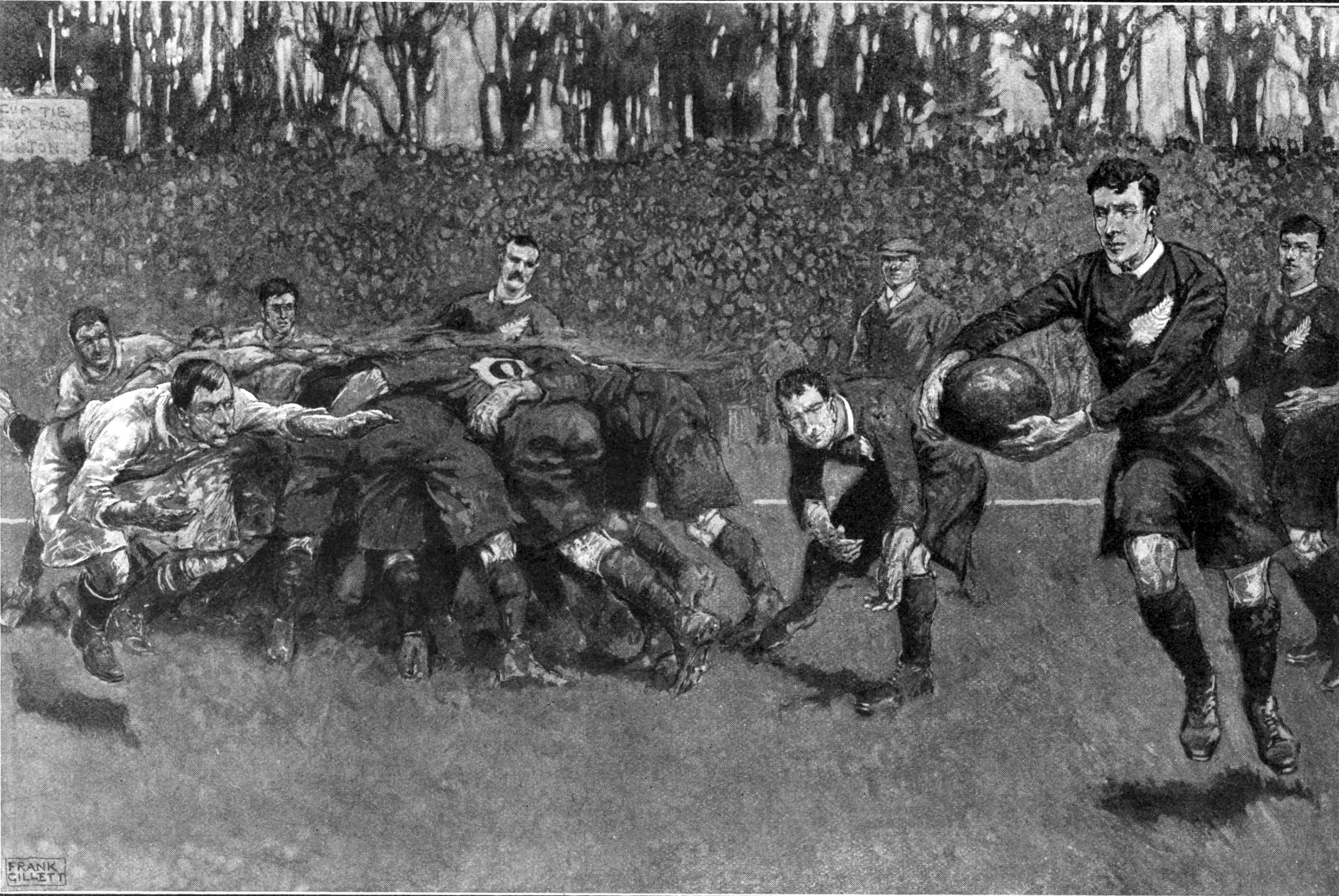
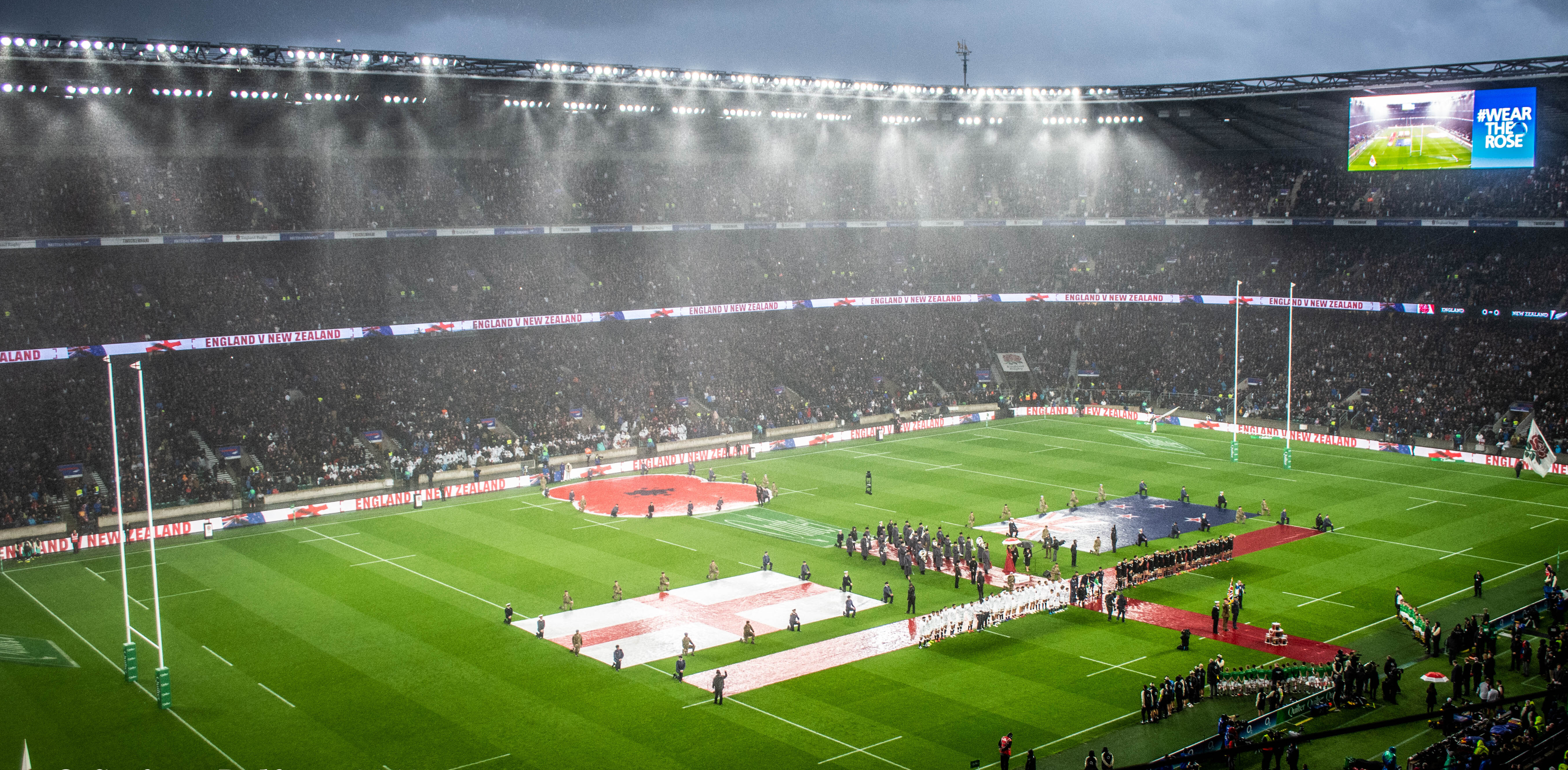
Top: Illustration by Frank Gillett showing the first England–New Zealand Test match at Crystal Palace. It was also the game which earned New Zealand the nickname "All Blacks".
Bottom: England–New Zealand match at Twickenham Stadium, 2018.

The national rugby union teams of England and New Zealand have been playing each other in test rugby since 1905, with the first meeting between the two nations being on 2 December 1905, when the All Blacks were in England as part of their European and North America Tour. The All Blacks won 15-0 with their points coming from five tries, of which four were scored by winger Duncan McGregor. Their next meeting was on the All Blacks Invincibles tour of 1924-25. The match was most notable for the sending off of All Black lock Cyril Brownlie, who became the first player to ever be sent off in a test match. In 1936 England defeated the All Blacks for the first time when England winger Prince Alexander Obolensky scored two tries during a 13–0 victory at Twickenham Stadium. The All Blacks have never lost more than two consecutive matches to England (twice, in losses in November 2002 and then June 2003 & November 2025 and 2026), and have dominated the rivalry between the teams. Of the 48 matches between them, New Zealand have won 36 and England 10, with two draws.

In 2008, the Hillary Shield was introduced as the trophy to be contested in matches between the two teams.

== Hillary Shield ==
The Hillary Shield has been awarded to the winner of England – New Zealand test matches since 2008. The shield is only contested in non-World Cup matches, and is named in honour of Sir Edmund Hillary — the first person to reach the summit of Mount Everest. It was also conceived to recognise the links between New Zealand and England. When the shield was unveiled in 2008 by New Zealand's Prime Minister at the time, Helen Clark, and Hillary's widow, Lady June Hillary, Clark said of Hillary "He was part of a British expedition when he conquered Mt Everest shortly after the coronation of Queen Elizabeth II".

== Summary ==
=== Overall ===
| Details | Played | Won by England | Won by New Zealand | Drawn | England points | New Zealand points |
|---|---|---|---|---|---|---|
| In England | 29 | 7 | 20 | 2 | 416 | 554 |
| In New Zealand | 17 | 2 | 15 | 0 | 242 | 494 |
| Neutral venue | 2 | 1 | 1 | 0 | 48 | 52 |
| Overall | 48 | 10 | 36 | 2 | 706 | 1,110 |

=== Records ===
Note: Date shown in brackets indicates when the record was last set.

| Record | England | New Zealand |
|---|---|---|
| Longest winning streak | 2 (9 Nov 2002 – 12 Jun 2004; 15 November 2025 – present) | 9 (12 Jun 2004 – 1 Dec 2012) |
Largest points for
| Home | 38 (1 Dec 2012) | 64 (20 Jun 1998) |
| Away | 27 (14 Jun 2014) | 45 (18 Jun 1995) |
Largest winning margin
| Home | 25 (21 Nov 2026) | 42 (20 Jun 1998) |
| Away | 12 (26 Oct 2019) | 26 (29 Nov 2008) |

== Results ==
| No. | Date | Venue | Score | Winner | Competition |
|---|---|---|---|---|---|
| 1 | 2 December 1905 | Crystal Palace, London | 0 – 15 | New Zealand | 1905–06 New Zealand tour |
| 2 | 3 January 1925 | Twickenham, London | 11 – 17 | New Zealand | 1924–25 New Zealand tour |
| 3 | 4 January 1936 | Twickenham, London | 13 – 0 | England | 1935–36 New Zealand tour |
| 4 | 30 January 1954 | Twickenham, London | 0 – 5 | New Zealand | 1953–54 New Zealand tour |
| 5 | 25 May 1963 | Eden Park, Auckland | 21 – 11 | New Zealand | 1963 England tour |
| 6 | 1 June 1963 | Lancaster Park, Christchurch | 9 – 6 | New Zealand | 1963 England tour |
| 7 | 4 January 1964 | Twickenham, London | 0 – 14 | New Zealand | 1963–64 New Zealand tour |
| 8 | 4 November 1967 | Twickenham, London | 11 – 23 | New Zealand | 1967 New Zealand tour |
| 9 | 6 January 1973 | Twickenham, London | 0 – 9 | New Zealand | 1972–73 New Zealand tour |
| 10 | 15 September 1973 | Eden Park, Auckland | 10 – 16 | England | 1973 England tour |
| 11 | 25 November 1978 | Twickenham, London | 6 – 16 | New Zealand | 1978 New Zealand tour |
| 12 | 24 November 1979 | Twickenham, London | 9 – 10 | New Zealand | 1979 New Zealand tour |
| 13 | 19 November 1983 | Twickenham, London | 15 – 9 | England | 1983 New Zealand tour |
| 14 | 1 June 1985 | Lancaster Park, Christchurch | 18 – 13 | New Zealand | 1985 England tour |
| 15 | 8 June 1985 | Athletic Park, Wellington | 42 – 15 | New Zealand | 1985 England tour |
| 16 | 3 October 1991 | Twickenham, London | 12 – 18 | New Zealand | 1991 Rugby World Cup Pool Stage |
| 17 | 27 November 1993 | Twickenham, London | 15 – 9 | England | 1993 New Zealand tour |
| 18 | 18 June 1995 | Newlands, Cape Town, South Africa | 45 – 29 | New Zealand | 1995 Rugby World Cup Semi-final |
| 19 | 22 November 1997 | Old Trafford, Manchester | 8 – 25 | New Zealand | 1997 New Zealand tour |
| 20 | 6 December 1997 | Twickenham, London | 26 – 26 | draw | 1997 New Zealand tour |
| 21 | 20 June 1998 | Carisbrook, Dunedin | 64 – 22 | New Zealand | 1998 England tour |
| 22 | 27 June 1998 | Eden Park, Auckland | 40 – 10 | New Zealand | 1998 England tour |
| 23 | 9 October 1999 | Twickenham, London | 16 – 30 | New Zealand | 1999 Rugby World Cup Pool Stage |
| 24 | 9 November 2002 | Twickenham, London | 31 – 28 | England | 2002 end-of-year rugby union internationals |
| 25 | 14 June 2003 | Westpac Stadium, Wellington | 13 – 15 | England | 2003 England tour |
| 26 | 12 June 2004 | Carisbrook, Dunedin | 36 – 3 | New Zealand | 2004 England tour |
| 27 | 19 June 2004 | Eden Park, Auckland | 36 – 12 | New Zealand | 2004 England tour |
| 28 | 19 November 2005 | Twickenham, London | 19 – 23 | New Zealand | 2005 end-of-year rugby union internationals |
| 29 | 5 November 2006 | Twickenham, London | 20 – 41 | New Zealand | 2006 end-of-year rugby union internationals |
| 30 | 14 June 2008 | Eden Park, Auckland | 37 – 20 | New Zealand | 2008 England tour |
| 31 | 21 June 2008 | AMI Stadium, Christchurch | 44 – 12 | New Zealand | 2008 England tour |
| 32 | 29 November 2008 | Twickenham, London | 6 – 32 | New Zealand | 2008 end-of-year rugby union internationals |
| 33 | 21 November 2009 | Twickenham, London | 6 – 19 | New Zealand | 2009 end-of-year rugby union internationals |
| 34 | 6 November 2010 | Twickenham, London | 16 – 26 | New Zealand | 2010 end-of-year rugby union internationals |
| 35 | 1 December 2012 | Twickenham, London | 38 – 21 | England | 2012 end-of-year rugby union internationals |
| 36 | 16 November 2013 | Twickenham, London | 22 – 30 | New Zealand | 2013 end-of-year rugby union internationals |
| 37 | 7 June 2014 | Eden Park, Auckland | 20 – 15 | New Zealand | 2014 England tour |
| 38 | 14 June 2014 | Forsyth Barr Stadium, Dunedin | 28 – 27 | New Zealand | 2014 England tour |
| 39 | 21 June 2014 | Waikato Stadium, Hamilton | 36 – 13 | New Zealand | 2014 England tour |
| 40 | 8 November 2014 | Twickenham, London | 21 – 24 | New Zealand | 2014 end-of-year rugby union internationals |
| 41 | 10 November 2018 | Twickenham, London | 15 – 16 | New Zealand | 2018 end-of-year rugby union internationals |
| 42 | 26 October 2019 | Nissan Stadium, Yokohama, Japan | 19 – 7 | England | 2019 Rugby World Cup Semi-final |
| 43 | 19 November 2022 | Twickenham, London | 25 – 25 | draw | 2022 end-of-year rugby union internationals |
| 44 | 6 July 2024 | Forsyth Barr Stadium, Dunedin | 16 – 15 | New Zealand | 2024 England tour |
| 45 | 13 July 2024 | Eden Park, Auckland | 24 – 17 | New Zealand | 2024 England tour |
| 46 | 2 November 2024 | Twickenham, London | 22 – 24 | New Zealand | 2024 end-of-year rugby union internationals |
| 47 | 15 November 2025 | Twickenham, London | 33 – 19 | England | 2025 end-of-year rugby union internationals |
| 48 | 21 November 2026 | Twickenham, London | 37 – 12 | England | 2026 Nations Championship |

== List of series ==
| Played | Won by England | Won by New Zealand | Drawn |
|---|---|---|---|
| 8 | 0 | 8 | 0 |

| Year | England | New Zealand | Series winner | Hillary Shield |
|---|---|---|---|---|
| (New Zealand) 1963 | 0 | 2 | New Zealand | N/A |
| (New Zealand) 1985 | 0 | 2 | New Zealand | N/A |
| (England) 1997 | 0 | 1 | New Zealand | N/A |
| (New Zealand) 1998 | 0 | 2 | New Zealand | N/A |
| (New Zealand) 2004 | 0 | 2 | New Zealand | N/A |
| (New Zealand) 2008 | 0 | 2 | New Zealand | N/A |
| (New Zealand) 2014 | 0 | 3 | New Zealand | |
| (New Zealand) 2024 | 0 | 2 | New Zealand | |
