= Stuart Lancaster (rugby union) =

English rugby union player & coach

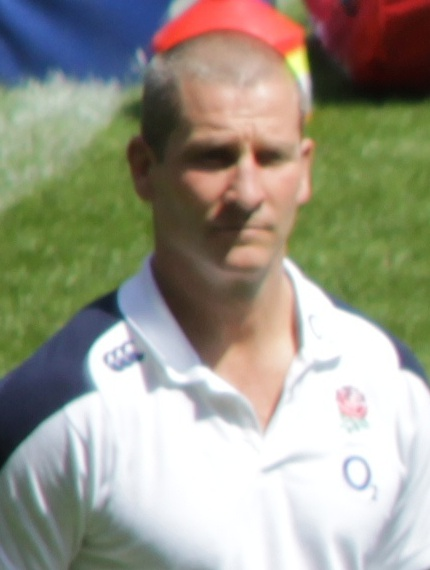
- Lancaster in 2013
- Born: 9 October 1969 (age 57) Penrith, Cumberland, England
- Weight: 13 st 9 lb (191 lb; 87 kg)
- School: St. Bees School
- University: Carnegie College

Rugby union career
- Position: Hooker / Flanker
Senior career
Years	Team	Apps	(Points)
1988–1991	Wakefield		
1991–2000	Leeds Tykes	106	
1999	Anti-Assassins		
International career
Years	Team	Apps	(Points)
1988	Scotland Students	1	(0)
1989	Scotland U19	1	(0)
1991	Scotland U21	1	(0)
Coaching career
- Years: Team
- 2001–2006: Leeds Tykes (head of academy)
- 2006–2008: Leeds Tykes/Carnegie
- 2008–2011: RFU (head of elite player development)
- 2008–2011: England Saxons
- 2011–2015: England
- 2016–2023: Leinster (senior coach)
- 2023–2025: Racing 92
- 2025-: Connacht Rugby
- Correct as of 3 June 2025

William Stuart Lancaster (born 9 October 1969) is an English rugby union coach and former player who is currently the head coach of Irish club Connacht.

After managing Leeds Tykes/Carnegie and the England Saxons, Lancaster was appointed as the head coach of the English national team in 2011 until he stepped down in 2015, following the World Cup. He then joined Leinster as a senior coach the following year where he won one European Rugby Champions Cup in 2018 as well as four Pro 14 championships within a staff run by Leo Cullen before leaving for Racing 92 in 2023.

== Early life and education ==
William Stuart Lancaster was born on 9 October 1969 in Penrith, Cumberland. He grew up in the village of Culgaith, where he was sent to St. Bees School. He started his rugby playing career at the school playing for the 1st XV, in a rugby league area. He started in the front row as a hooker, although at the age of 15, he moved to flanker where he played his best rugby. After leaving school in 1988, Lancaster headed to Carnegie College in Leeds to train as a PE Teacher, while continuing his rugby career playing for Wakefield RFC. After qualifying in 1991, he began teaching at Kettlethorpe High School.

== Playing career ==
In 1991 Lancaster started playing for Headingley RFC. When Headingley merged with Roundhay RUFC, Lancaster joined the newly formed team Leeds RFU, where he would play the remainder of career. In 1998, he took a substantial leave from teaching to become a full-time professional rugby player with Leeds Tykes, of which he became the first Leeds player to play a century of games since the amalgamation of Headingley and Roundhay, and was named captain of newly branded team.

Through his Scottish mother he played for Scotland Students, Scotland U19 and Scotland U21. Lancaster was forced to retire from playing rugby aged 30. A teenage Tom Palmer, who would later play under Lancaster, hit a tackle bag that Stuart was holding, tearing his hamstring off the bone completely.

== Coaching career ==
=== Leeds Tykes/Carnegie ===
After retiring in 2000, Lancaster ran the Leeds RFU Academy for five years from 2001. However, in 2006 after Leeds Tykes were relegated after the 2005–06 Guinness Premiership season, Lancaster replaced Phil Davies as head coach before the 2006–07 National Division One. In Lancaster's debut season, he led Leeds to promotion with 122 points. The victory was without high-profile players like Justin Marshall and Iain Balshaw. Now back in the top flight English rugby competition, Leeds Carnegie – the renamed title of the club – remained bottom of the table for the whole season, only getting 2 victories from 22, and were relegated at the end of the 2007–08 Guinness Premiership season. Lancaster later departed the club after being appointed RFU's Elite Rugby Director.

=== England Saxons and head of elite player development ===
Rob Andrew, the RFU's Elite Rugby Director announced Lancaster's appointment on 6 May 2008 stating "This is a very important appointment for the department. Stuart brings Guinness Premiership coaching experience and is also one of the coaches who has achieved the Elite Coaching Level 5 qualification." The move was taken poorly by the owners of Leeds Carnegie the club where he was Director of Rugby before joining the RFU, who felt they should have been contacted regarding the appointment.

Part of Lancaster's role was to develop younger players, which saw Lancaster coach the England Saxons during the 2008 Churchill Cup winning campaign. This included a 62–10 win over the United States and a 34–12 win over the Ireland Wolfhounds, to set up a Cup Final against Scotland A, of which England Saxons won 36–19. Lancaster returned to role for the 2010 Churchill Cup, which saw the Saxons win all three of their matches including the cup final against Canada, winning 38–18. He oversaw the Saxons sixth winning campaign during the 2011 Churchill Cup, which for the first time England hosted. The winning campaign included a record 87–8 victory over the United States and a 41–14 win over Tonga. They beat Canada for a second consecutive year, winning 37–6 at the Sixways Stadium in Worcester. In addition to the England Saxons, Lancaster also oversaw an impressive period for the England U20's team, which included a grand slam victory during the 2011 Six Nations Under 20s Championship and three finals berths in the IRB Junior World Championship between 2008 and 2011.

=== England ===
Lancaster's tenure as head coach has been praised for the overhaul and reformation of England's squad culture, which had resulted in much media attention to the team's off-field antics during the 2011 Rugby World Cup, which immediately preceded Lancaster's reign. Lancaster has demanded that England's players be good role models, and as such has excluded players from various squads. Examples of this policy include Danny Care's exclusion from the 2012 Six Nations Championship, and Manu Tuilagi's omission from England's 2015 Rugby World Cup preparations. However, Lancaster's team selections, particularly at centre, and his failure to select or develop a specialist openside flanker for England have been criticised.

Following the 2011 Rugby World Cup, England head coach Martin Johnson resigned from his post, with the RFU appointing Lancaster as interim head coach for the 2012 Six Nations Championship, while the RFU continued to search for a full-time coach, with the likes of South African Nick Mallett and New Zealander Wayne Smith reportedly expressing interest in the vacant job. On 29 March 2012, following a second-place finish in the Six Nations campaign, Lancaster was appointed as the English head coach, keeping his assistants Graham Rowntree and Andy Farrell.

Lancaster's first match in charge as the official head coach came on 27 May 2012 against the Barbarians, which England won 57–26, though this was not a full test match. this was followed by a three test tour of South Africa. The 9 June clash with South Africa was Lancaster's first test match in charge, and England lost to the Springboks 22–17. A week later England were defeated again 36–27. However, in the final test on 23 June 2015, England secured a 14–14 draw, their first draw since 8 December 1906.

During the 2012 end-of-year rugby union internationals, Lancaster led the English to narrow defeats to Australia 20–14 and South Africa 15–16, before leading England to a 38–21 victory over World Cup Champions New Zealand. Despite beating the No. 1 ranked team in the world, England's earlier losses proved costly, as they lowered England's seeding for the 2015 Rugby World Cup draw, held three years in advance. On 1 December 2012, England were drawn in Pool A for the World Cup, alongside Australia and Wales.

During 2013, Lancaster led England to second in the Six Nations for a second consecutive year. Lancaster led the team to a 12–6 victory over Ireland in Ireland, England's first victory in Ireland since their 2003 Grand Slam triumph. England could have claimed their first grand slam since 2003, however a record 30–3 loss to Wales in the final week at the Millennium Stadium, saw Wales claim the Six Nations title. The scale of the defeat saw Lancaster criticised for his selection of inside centre, and the balance of England's back row, which lacked a breakdown specialist to compete with Wales' Sam Warburton and Justin Tipuric.

In the summer of 2013, Lancaster led England to a 2–0 test series victory over Argentina, with England winning their matches by 32–3 and 51–26 on Argentine soil. On 2 November 2013, Lancaster reclaimed the Cook Cup after leading England to a 20–13 victory over Australia, before beating Argentina for a third consecutive time 31–12. England's 2013 Autumn campaign ended with a 22–30 loss to the All Blacks, who retained the Hillary Shield after losing it in 2012.

In 2014, England finished second in the Six Nations for a third time under Lancaster, with a loss against France, 26–24 in Paris, coming in the opening week of the tournament. England did however record a 20–0 victory over Scotland in Edinburgh, which was the first time Scotland had failed to score any points against England since 1978, and defeated Wales, Ireland, and Italy.

During England's 2014 tour to New Zealand, Lancaster narrowly lost to the All Blacks 20–15 at Eden Park. In this first test, the English team did not feature any Saracens or Northampton Saints players due to a scheduling clash with the 2013–14 Aviva Premiership final a week before the opening test, when Lancaster needed his squad to attend England's training camp. The second test, where Saracens and Saints players returned to the starting XV, saw England lose by a single point, losing 28–27 in Dunedin. New Zealand won the final test 36–13 to claim a 3–0 series victory over England. England started their 2014 Autumn campaign with a fourth consecutive match against the World Champions, which saw New Zealand win 24–21. In the following week, England lost their fifth consecutive match, their worst run of defeats since their 7 consecutive losses in 2006, losing 31–28 to South Africa. The losing streak ended on 22 November, when England beat Samoa 28–9, while on 29 November, Lancaster led England against Australia to win 26–17.

During the 2015 Six Nations Championship, Lancaster led England to a fourth consecutive second position in the Six Nations. Lancaster was applauded for his coaching during the opening match against Wales, which saw an England side depleted due to injury beat a first choice Welsh side 21–16 in Cardiff. England lost one match, to eventual champions Ireland, 19–9 in Dublin.

During England's preparations for the 2015 World Cup, Lancaster took the squad to Colorado for a 2-week training programme, followed by tests against France and Ireland. England beat France at Twickenham 19–14, but lost the return fixture 25–20. Their final warm-up match saw England beat Ireland 21–13.

During the 2015 Rugby World Cup, Lancaster led England to their worst ever performance at a World Cup. England became the first English team, and the first former World Champions to be knocked out in the group stages of the tournament. Having beaten Fiji in the opening match 35–11, England went on to lose to both Wales, 28–25, and Australia 33–13. Not only did this mean England were eliminated from the tournament after only three weeks of matches, but until the final week there was a risk that England may not finish third to automatically qualify for the 2019 Rugby World Cup. After Uruguay's loss to Fiji on 6 October and England's third-place finish, qualification for 2019 was confirmed. The 33–13 loss against Australia was England's largest ever defeat to Australia at Twickenham. A week after being knocked out of their own World Cup, England played their first home match away from Twickenham in over a decade. They faced Uruguay at the City of Manchester Stadium, winning 60–3. The match saw Lancaster select his 20th mid-field (fly-half and centre combination) in his 4 years in charge. Inconsistent mid-field selection was one of the main issues on which England's early departure from the World Cup was blamed.

Following the conclusion of the 2015 Rugby World Cup, Lancaster, along with his assistant coaches and the RFU, were particularly severely criticised for their handling of Rugby League convert, Sam Burgess. Lancaster had selected Burgess to play for England as a centre, despite Burgess being developed as a flanker by his club Bath, and despite Burgess's relative inexperience, having only played 17 games for his club. Lancaster's selection appeared to be inconsistent with some of his previously stated principles, that he would select players based on form, and that he would not select outsiders, such as English players based in the Top 14, in part because it might unsettle players who had been in the England squad for a number of seasons. Burgess left Rugby Union to return to Rugby League shortly after the conclusion of the Rugby World Cup. Mike Ford, Burgess's coach at Bath, later stated that he felt Burgess would have stayed in Rugby Union had he not been picked in England's World Cup squad.

On 11 November 2015, Lancaster announced his resignation as England Head Coach, taking full "responsibility for the team's performance during the tournament".

==== International matches as head coach ====
===== Record by country =====
Opponent	Played	Won	Drawn	Lost	Win ratio (%)	Pts For	Against
Argentina	3	3	0	0	100	114	41
Australia	4	2	0	2	50	73	83
Fiji	2	2	0	0	100	89	23
France	6	4	0	2	67	165	135
Ireland	5	4	0	1	80	85	57
Italy	4	4	0	0	100	136	54
New Zealand	6	1	0	5	17	136	159
Samoa	1	1	0	0	100	28	9
Scotland	4	4	0	0	100	96	37
South Africa	5	0	1	4	0	101	119
Uruguay	1	1	0	0	100	60	3
Wales	5	2	0	3	40	90	111
TOTAL	46	28	1	17	61	1173	831

===== All matches =====
Note: World Rankings Column shows the World Ranking England was placed at on the following Monday after each of their matches

Matches (2012–2015)
Match	Date	Opposition	Venue	Score (Eng.–Opponent)	Competition	Captain	World Rank
2012
1	4 February	Scotland	Murrayfield, Edinburgh	13–6	Six Nations	Chris Robshaw	5th
2	11 February	Italy	Stadio Olimpico, Rome	19–15	Six Nations	Chris Robshaw	5th
3	25 February	Wales	Twickenham, London	12–19	Six Nations	Chris Robshaw	6th
4	11 March	France	Stade de France, Paris	24–22	Six Nations	Chris Robshaw	4th
5	17 March	Ireland	Twickenham, London	30–9	Six Nations	Chris Robshaw	4th
6	9 June	South Africa	Kings Park Stadium, Durban	17–22	South Africa test series	Chris Robshaw	4th
7	16 June	South Africa	Ellis Park, Johannesburg	27–36	South Africa test series	Chris Robshaw	5th
8	23 June	South Africa	Nelson Mandela Bay Stadium, Port Elizabeth	14–14	South Africa test series	Dylan Hartley	4th
9	10 November	Fiji	Twickenham, London	54–12	Autumn internationals	Chris Robshaw	5th
10	17 November	Australia	Twickenham, London	14–20	Autumn internationals	Chris Robshaw	5th
11	24 November	South Africa	Twickenham, London	15–16	Autumn internationals	Chris Robshaw	5th
12	1 December	New Zealand	Twickenham, London	38–21	Autumn internationals	Chris Robshaw	5th
2013
13	2 February	Scotland	Twickenham, London	38–18	Six Nations	Chris Robshaw	4th
14	10 February	Ireland	Aviva Stadium, Dublin	12–6	Six Nations	Chris Robshaw	4th
15	23 February	France	Twickenham, London	23–13	Six Nations	Chris Robshaw	4th
16	10 March	Italy	Twickenham, London	18–11	Six Nations	Chris Robshaw	4th
17	16 March	Wales	Millennium Stadium, Cardiff	3–30	Six Nations	Chris Robshaw	4th
18	8 June	Argentina	Estadio Padre Ernesto Martearena, Salta	32–3	Argentina test series	Tom Wood	4th
19	15 June	Argentina	José Amalfitani Stadium, Buenos Aires	51–26	Argentina test series	Tom Wood	4th
20	2 November	Australia	Twickenham, London	20–13	Autumn internationals	Chris Robshaw	3rd
21	9 November	Argentina	Twickenham, London	31–12	Autumn internationals	Chris Robshaw	3rd
22	16 November	New Zealand	Twickenham, London	22–30	Autumn internationals	Chris Robshaw	3rd
2014
23	1 February	France	Stade de France, Paris	24–26	Six Nations	Chris Robshaw	4th
24	8 February	Scotland	Murrayfield, Edinburgh	20–0	Six Nations	Chris Robshaw	4th
25	22 February	Ireland	Twickenham, London	13–10	Six Nations	Chris Robshaw	4th
26	9 March	Wales	Twickenham, London	29–18	Six Nations	Chris Robshaw	4th
27	15 March	Italy	Stadio Olimpico, Rome	52–11	Six Nations	Chris Robshaw	4th
28	7 June	New Zealand	Eden Park, Auckland	15–20	New Zealand test series	Chris Robshaw	4th
29	14 June	New Zealand	Forsyth Barr Stadium, Dunedin	27–28	New Zealand test series	Chris Robshaw	4th
30	21 June	New Zealand	Waikato Stadium, Hamilton	13–36	New Zealand test series	Chris Robshaw	4th
31	8 November	New Zealand	Twickenham, London	21–24	Autumn internationals	Chris Robshaw	4th
32	15 November	South Africa	Twickenham, London	28–31	Autumn internationals	Chris Robshaw	5th
33	22 November	Samoa	Twickenham, London	28–9	Autumn internationals	Chris Robshaw	4th
34	29 November	Australia	Twickenham, London	26–17	Autumn internationals	Chris Robshaw	4th
2015
35	6 February	Wales	Millennium Stadium, Cardiff	21–16	Six Nations	Chris Robshaw	3rd
36	14 February	Italy	Twickenham, London	47–17	Six Nations	Chris Robshaw	3rd
37	1 March	Ireland	Aviva Stadium, Dublin	9–19	Six Nations	Chris Robshaw	4th
38	14 March	Scotland	Twickenham, London	25–13	Six Nations	Chris Robshaw	4th
39	21 March	France	Twickenham, London	55–35	Six Nations	Chris Robshaw	4th
40	15 August	France	Twickenham, London	19–14	2015 RWC warm-ups	Tom Wood	4th
41	22 August	France	Stade de France, Paris	20–25	2015 RWC warm-ups	Chris Robshaw	5th
42	5 September	Ireland	Twickenham, London	21–13	2015 RWC warm-ups	Chris Robshaw	4th
43	18 September	Fiji	Twickenham, London	35–11	2015 Rugby World Cup	Chris Robshaw	3rd
44	26 September	Wales	Twickenham, London	25–28	2015 Rugby World Cup	Chris Robshaw	6th
45	3 October	Australia	Twickenham, London	13–33	2015 Rugby World Cup	Chris Robshaw	8th
46	10 October	Uruguay	City of Manchester Stadium, Manchester	60–3	2015 Rugby World Cup	Chris Robshaw	8th

=== Leinster ===
On 5 September 2016, Leinster announced that Lancaster would join their backroom team with immediate effect as a senior coach. It had been thought that the coaching staff for Leinster was complete, however the sudden departure of Kurt McQuilkin, due to family reasons, meant there was a position available. He was hailed as an inspirational coach by the Leinster players following the sides victory over Racing 92 in the 2018 Champions Cup final. During his time at the club and as part of the senior coaching team, Leinster also won four Guinness PRO12/14 titles. On 26 September 2022, Leinster Rugby announced that Lancaster would be leaving to join French Top 14 side Racing 92 for the following season.

=== Racing 92 ===
On 30 June 2023, Racing 92 officially announced the appointment of Lancaster as first-team head coach alongside assistants Dimitri Szarzewski, Frédéric Michalak and Joe Rokocoko.

=== Connacht ===
On 3 June 2025, Lancaster was announced as the new head coach of Connacht Rugby on a two-year deal.

== Honours ==
=== Player ===
Wakefield

- Yorkshire Cup
  - (gold) Champion (1): 1990

Leeds

- Yorkshire Cup
  - (gold) Champion (1): 1998

=== Coach ===
Leeds Tykes

- National Division One
  - (gold) Champion (1): 2006–07

England Saxons

- Churchill Cup
  - (gold) Champion (3): 2008, 2010, 2011

England

- Six Nations Championship
  - (silver) Runner-up (4): 2012, 2013, 2014, 2015
    - Triple Crown
      - Winner (1): 2014
    - Calcutta Cup
      - Winner (4): 2012, 2013, 2014, 2015
    - Millennium Trophy
      - Winner (3): 2012, 2013, 2014

Leinster

- Champions Cup
  - (gold) Champion (1): 2017–18
  - (silver) Runner-up (3): 2018–19, 2021–22, 2022–23
- Pro14
  - (gold) Champion (4): 2017–18, 2018–19, 2019–20, 2020–21

Sporting positions
Preceded by Martin Johnson	English national rugby coach 2012–2015	Succeeded by Eddie Jones
