= Matt Mullan =

England international rugby union player

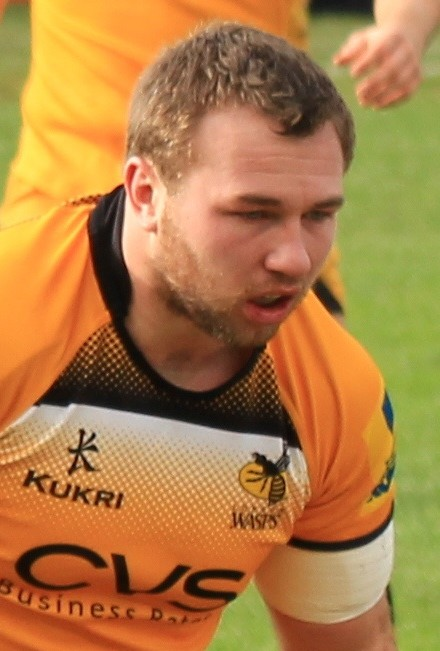
- Mullan playing for London Wasps in 2014
- Born: Matthew James Mullan; 23 February 1987 (age 39) Brighton, England
- Height: 1.83 m (6 ft 0 in)
- Weight: 115 kg (18 st 2 lb; 254 lb)
- School: Bromsgrove School

Rugby union career
- Position(s): Loosehead prop, Hooker
Senior career
Years	Team	Apps	(Points)
2005–2013	Worcester Warriors	113	(25)
2013–2019	Wasps	111	(25)
- Correct as of 28 June 2017
International career
Years	Team	Apps	(Points)
2010–2017	England	17	(0)
2011	England Saxons	3	(0)
- Correct as of 19 June 2017

Matthew James Mullan (born 23 February 1987) is a retired English international rugby union player, between 2010 and 2017 he gained 17 caps for England while playing club rugby for Wasps and Worcester Warriors in Premiership Rugby. He played loosehead prop but also played at hooker.

== Club career ==
Born in Brighton and educated at Bromsgrove School, Mullan made his Worcester Warriors debut against the Newport Gwent Dragons in the Anglo-Welsh Cup. He was on the losing side in the final of the 2007–08 European Challenge Cup. In November 2009, Mullan signed a new two-year contract.

In January 2013 he agreed to join Wasps for the 2013–14 season.

In January 2019 Mullen retired from rugby citing a lack of motivation after a long spell out with injury.

== International career ==
Mullan represented the England under-20s during their 2007 Six Nations campaign. and was selected for the England Saxons against Ireland A in April 2009, though the game was cancelled due to poor weather conditions.

Mullan did not tour in the summer of 2009 due to a shoulder injury, whilst a torn hamstring thwarted a possible Senior debut in the 2009 Autumn Internationals.

Mullan replaced the injured Andrew Sheridan in the senior squad for the 2010 Six Nations Championship, and made his senior international debut as a replacement for Tim Payne against Italy in Rome on 14 February 2010.

Mullan was called up to Eddie Jones' first squad for the 2016 Six Nations Championship in January 2016.
