= Michael Paterson =

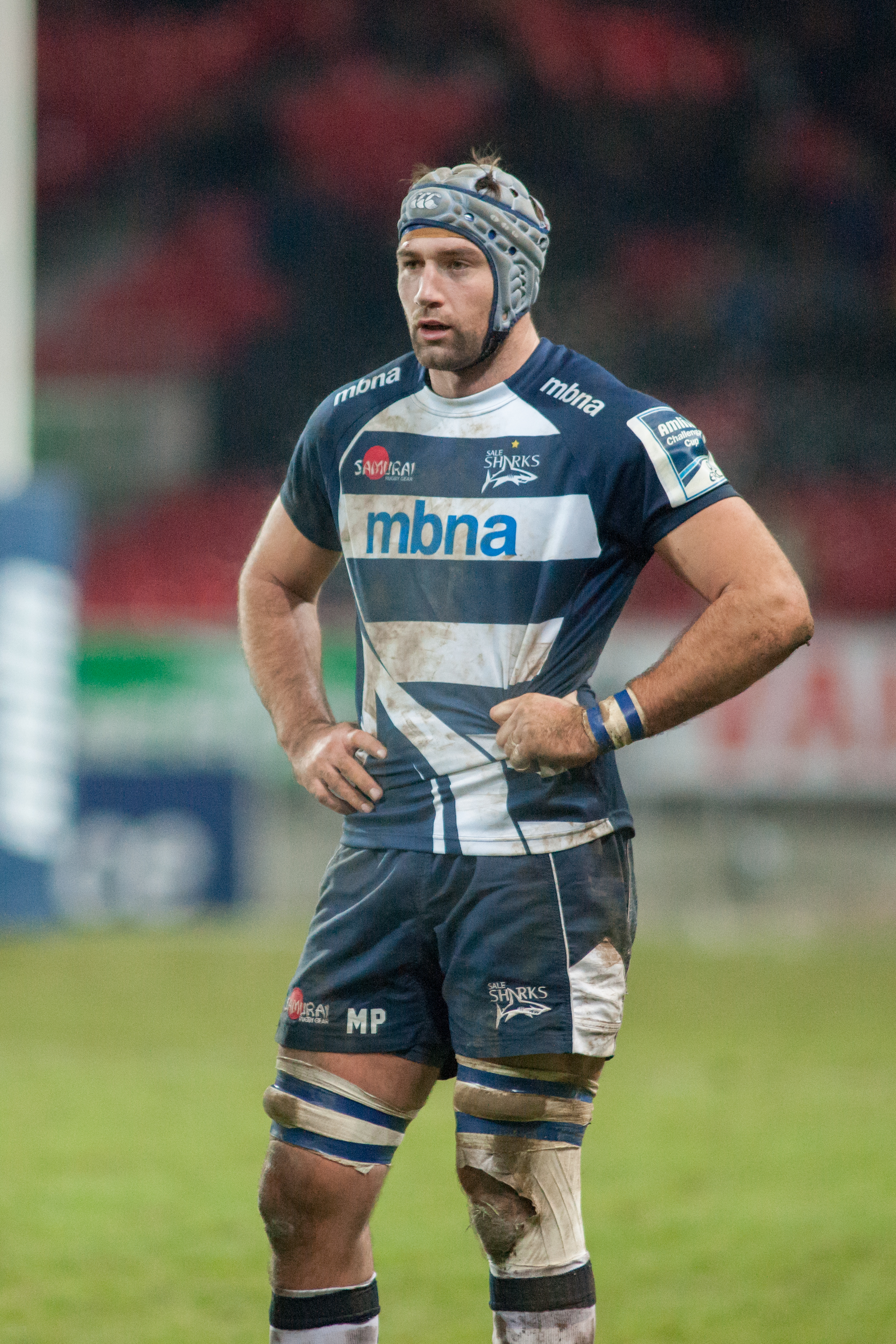
- Born: 9 May 1985 (age 41) Christchurch, New Zealand
- Height: 1.96 m (6 ft 5 in)
- Weight: 107 kg (16 st 12 lb)

Rugby union career
- Position(s): Lock; Back row
Senior career
Years	Team	Apps	(Points)
2010–2013	Cardiff Blues	44	(10)
2013–2015	Sale Sharks	38	(15)
2015–2018	Northampton Saints	60	(10)
Provincial / State sides
Years	Team	Apps	(Points)
2006–2009	Canterbury	39	(30)
Super Rugby
Years	Team	Apps	(Points)
2007–2009	Crusaders	22	(0)
2010	Hurricanes	13	(15)

Michael Paterson (born 9 May 1985) is a former rugby union player who played as a lock or blindside flanker. He played for the Cardiff Blues in the Pro12 league, as well as Sale Sharks and Northampton Saints in Premiership Rugby. Paterson has represented the New Zealand under 21s but did not gain a cap for the All Blacks. Before moving to Cardiff, Paterson was considered by many to be a strong contender to join the New Zealand squad.

Patterson joined Northampton Saints for the 2015/16 season where he became a key player for the first team and made few appearances for the Saints' second team, Northampton Wanderers. He made 60 appearances for the club, before his departure was announced at the end of the 2017–18 season.

== International career ==
Having completed three years residency at the beginning of the 2012–13 Pro12 season, Paterson became eligible to play for Wales. Eligible to play for England, through an English grandfather, Paterson was selected for the England squad to face the Barbarians in the summer of 2014.
