= Ross Harrison (rugby union) =

English rugby union player

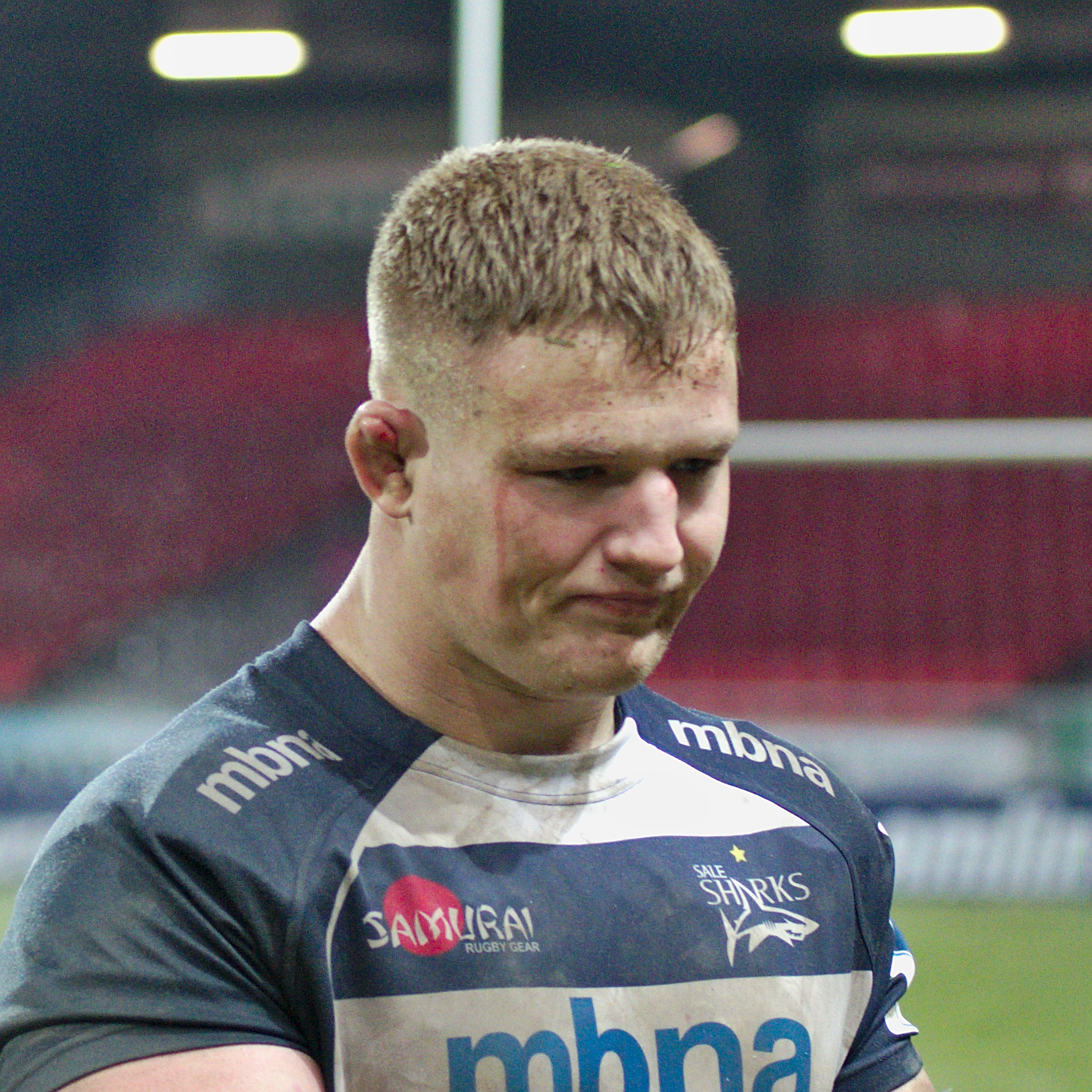
- Born: Ross Alexander Harrison; 3 September 1992 (age 34) Bolton, England
- Height: 1.85 m (6 ft 1 in)
- Weight: 118 kg (260 lb; 18 st 8 lb)
- School: Lymm High School

Rugby union career
- Position: Prop
Senior career
Years	Team	Apps	(Points)
2011–2025	Sale Sharks	300	(5)
2011	→ Sedgley Park (loan)	1	(0)
- Correct as of 2 June 2025
International career
Years	Team	Apps	(Points)
- England U18
2012	England U20	7	(0)
2016	England A	2	(0)
2014–2019	England XV	3	(0)
- Correct as of 2 June 2019

Ross Harrison (born 3 September 1992) is an English former rugby union player who played as a prop for over a decade with Sale Sharks.

== Career ==
In 2011 Harrison made his professional club debut for Sale Sharks. He represented England U20 during the 2012 Six Nations Under 20s Championship and played in the last round as England defeated Ireland to win the tournament. Later that year he was a member of the squad that finished seventh at the 2012 IRB Junior World Championship.

Harrison played in the 2013 Anglo-Welsh Cup final which they lost against Harlequins to finish runners-up. In June 2014 he was selected for the England squad to face the Barbarians.

In January 2015 Harrison was called up to the England A squad. Later that year he made his 100th appearance for Sale Sharks in a game against Harlequins on 6 November 2015. In the summer of 2016 Harrison was a member of the England A squad that toured South Africa and played in both games as England defeated South Africa A to win the series.

In May 2017 Harrison was invited to a training camp with the senior England squad by coach Eddie Jones. The following month he played for England XV in a non-cap game against Barbarians.

Harrison started for the Sale side that lost to La Rochelle in the semi-final of the 2018–19 European Rugby Challenge Cup. At the end of that season he started for an England XV in their 51–43 victory over Barbarians.

Harrison played in their 2021 Premiership play-off elimination against Exeter Chiefs. He was a member of the Sale side that were league runners-up during the 2022–2023 campaign although did not play in the Premiership final defeat against Saracens. In May 2025, Harrison announced he was leaving Sale after making over 300 appearances for the club during a fourteen year spell.

== Honours ==
Sale Sharks

- Premiership runner-up: 2022–2023
- Anglo-Welsh Cup runner-up: 2012–2013

England U20

- Six Nations Under 20s Championship: 2012
