= Nathan Catt =

- Born: Nathaniel Catt; 6 January 1988 (age 38) Bristol, England
- Height: 1.88 m (6 ft 2 in)
- Weight: 115 kg (18 st 2 lb; 254 lb)
- School: Clevedon Community School; City of Bath College
- Notable relative(s): Adam Reuben and Matt Patterson (Fight Club)

Rugby union career
- Position: Loosehead Prop
- Current team: Bath Rugby
Senior career
Years	Team	Apps	(Points)
2008–2020	Bath Rugby	174	(10)
- Correct as of 22 November 2014
International career
Years	Team	Apps	(Points)
2008	England U20		
2009	England Saxons	1	(0)

Nathan Catt (born 6 January 1988) is an English rugby union coach and retired player who played as a prop for Bath in the Aviva Premiership.

Catt played for England in the 2007 IRB U19 World Championships. In the 2008 U20 Six Nations, Catt started every game, as the England under-20 team won the grand slam. Catt was subsequently a member of the England Under 20 team that reached the final of the 2008 IRB Junior World Championship.

Catt made his England Saxons debut against Portugal in January 2009.

Catt made his Bath debut in an EDF Energy Cup match against Leicester Tigers. He made his League debut against Worcester Warriors.

Catt was called up to the senior England squad by Eddie Jones in January 2017.

He announced his retirement in 2020 due to long-term injury.
