= Hillary Shield =

International rugby union competition

- Sport: Rugby union
- Instituted: 2008
- Number of teams: 2
- Country: England; New Zealand
- Holders: England (2025)
- Most titles: New Zealand (14 titles)

The Hillary Shield is contested between England and New Zealand at rugby union. The first match was played on 29 November 2008 at Twickenham Stadium, London.

The trophy is named in memory of the New Zealand mountaineer and explorer, Sir Edmund Hillary. The shield was announced on 23 October 2008 by Jock Hobbs, the Chairman of the New Zealand Rugby Union. It was made by silversmiths Thomas Lyte.

== Matches ==
As of 15 November 2025.

Host	Matches	England wins	New Zealand wins	Draws	England points	New Zealand points
England	10	2	7	1	204	246
New Zealand	5	0	5	0	89	114
Overall	15	2	12	1	293	360

== Results ==
- ST – Mid-year rugby union internationals
- AI – End-of-year rugby union internationals

Year	Date	Venue	Home	Score	Away	Trophy Winner
2008	29 November	Twickenham, London	England	6–32	New Zealand	New Zealand
2009	21 November	Twickenham, London	England	6–19	New Zealand	New Zealand
2010	6 November	Twickenham, London	England	16–26	New Zealand	New Zealand
2012	1 December	Twickenham, London	England	38–21	New Zealand	England
2013	16 November	Twickenham, London	England	22–30	New Zealand	New Zealand
2014	7 June	Eden Park, Auckland	New Zealand	20–15	England	New Zealand
2014	14 June	Forsyth Barr Stadium, Dunedin	New Zealand	28–27	England	New Zealand
2014	21 June	Waikato Stadium, Hamilton	New Zealand	36–13	England	New Zealand
2014	8 November	Twickenham, London	England	21–24	New Zealand	New Zealand
2018	10 November	Twickenham, London	England	15–16	New Zealand	New Zealand
2022	19 November	Twickenham, London	England	25–25	New Zealand	New Zealand
2024	6 July	Forsyth Barr Stadium, Dunedin	New Zealand	16–15	England	New Zealand
2024	13 July	Eden Park, Auckland	New Zealand	24–17	England	New Zealand
2024	3 November	Twickenham, London	England	22–24	New Zealand	New Zealand
2025	15 November	Twickenham, London	England	33–19	New Zealand	England
2026	21 November	Twickenham, London	England	37–12	New Zealand	England

== See also ==
- History of rugby union matches between England and New Zealand
