= Rob Buchanan =

English rugby player (born 1991)

- Born: 13 May 1991 (age 35) Hong Kong
- Height: 1.83 m (6 ft 0 in)
- Weight: 102 kg (16 st 1 lb)
- School: St Bede's School, Eastbourne

Rugby union career
- Position: Hooker
Senior career
Years	Team	Apps	(Points)
2012-2020	Harlequins	120+	(25)
International career
Years	Team	Apps	(Points)
- England U20
–	England Saxons		

Rob Buchanan (born 13 May 1991) is an English former rugby union footballer who played for Harlequins in the Gallagher Premiership. He played as a Hooker. He was a replacement for Harlequins in their 2011–12 Premiership final victory over Leicester Tigers.

Buchanan was selected for the England squad to face the Barbarians in the summer of 2014.

In May 2017 he was invited to a training camp with the senior England squad by Eddie Jones.

In June 2020 Buchanan announced his retirement from rugby to pursue other business interests.
