= Joe Gray (rugby union) =

England international rugby union player

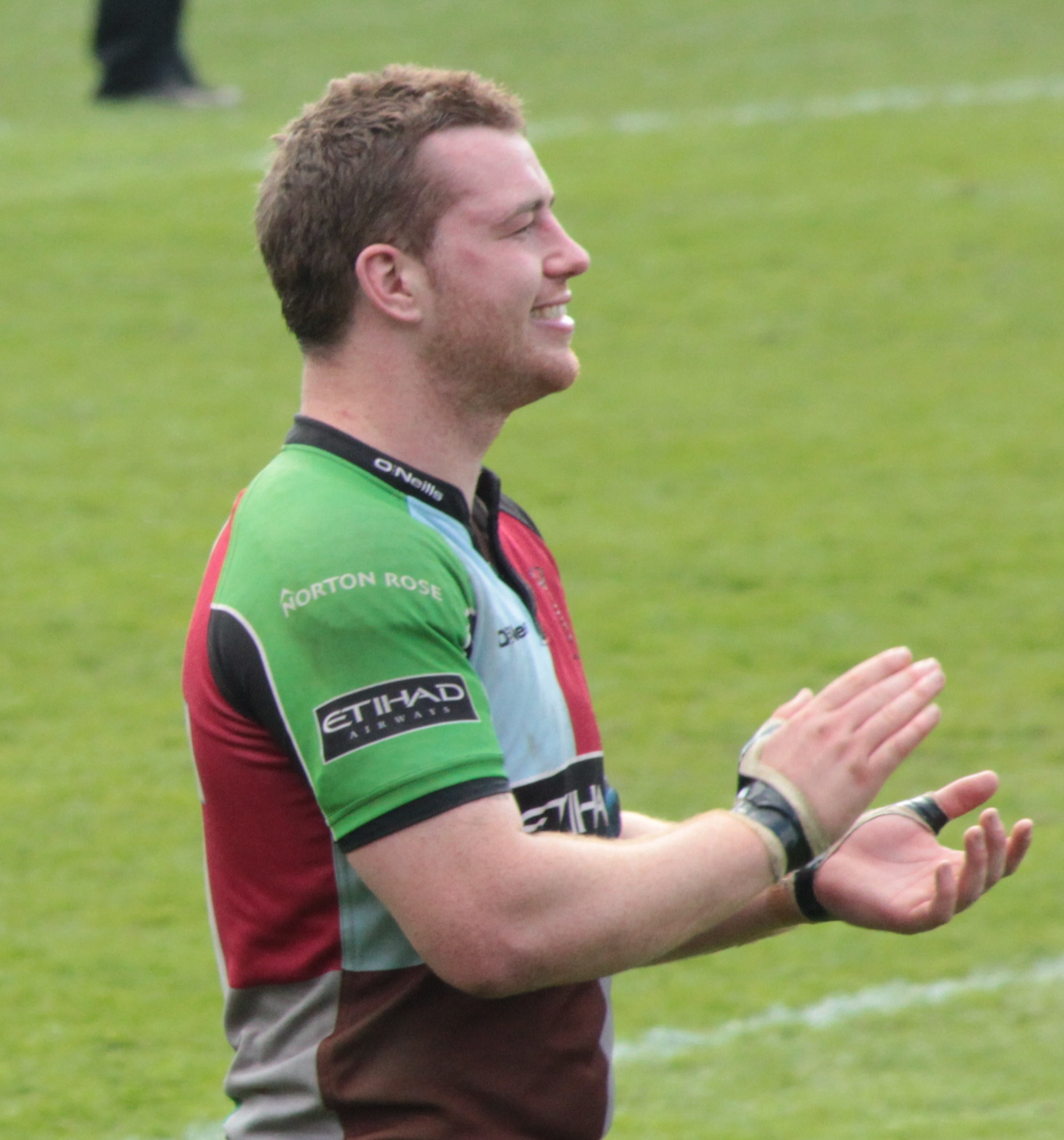
- Born: 5 August 1988 (age 38) Nottingham, England
- Height: 1.85 m (6 ft 1 in)
- Weight: 108 kg (17 st 0 lb)

Rugby union career
- Position: Hooker
Senior career
Years	Team	Apps	(Points)
2007–2010	Northampton Saints	18	(0)
2010–2018	Harlequins	151	(35)
2018–2020	Saracens	18	(0)
2020–2022	Harlequins	28	(5)
2007–2022	Total	215	(40)
- Correct as of 30 June 2022
International career
Years	Team	Apps	(Points)
2011	England Saxons	?	(?)
2014	England	1	(0)
- Correct as of 26 November 2018
Coaching career
- Years: Team
- 2022–: London Scottish

Joe Gray (born 5 August 1988) is an English rugby union coach for London Scottish in the RFU Championship and a retired player. He played for Harlequins in Premiership Rugby across two spells. He is the only player in history to have won every trophy available to players in the top two tiers of English rugby, including both European trophies. He played as a hooker, and previously played for Northampton Saints and Saracens.

== Career ==
Gray started his rugby career at Nottingham, he was part of the Nottinghamshire County Schools Rugby Club and also played with Notts, Lincs & Derby County side. Gray took part in a tour of Australia with Three Counties at the age of 15. He played for England under16's A and played for the England under 18's the following year while he was still only 16.

Gray won the Churchill Cup with the England Saxons after starting the Challenge Cup final for Harlequins that they won in 2011.

He started for Harlequins in their 2011–12 Premiership final victory over Leicester Tigers. Following his 80 minutes in the final he toured with England that summer to South Africa and played in the two midweek uncapped games against the South African Barbarians.

On 27 January 2019, Gray faced his old club Harlequins in a Premiership Rugby Cup match, against Saracens. An away win for Saracens, in which Gray came on in the second half. He was a replacement as Saracens won the 2019 European Rugby Champions Cup Final. He returned to Harlequins on loan in January 2020 before signing full time with the club.

Gray won his second Premiership title, this time as a replacement, as Harlequins won the game 40–38 in the highest scoring Premiership final ever on 26 June 2021.

Gray got his first taste of club coaching with King's Rugby in the 2015–16 season before going on to become the Director of Rugby at Barnes RFC.

Following his retirement from playing at the end of the 2021–22 season. He became head coach at London Scottish.

== International career ==
Gray was called up again to the England training squad by coach Stuart Lancaster in May 2014 and flew out with the squad for the Barbarians' fixtures. He made his England debut during the tour, coming off the bench in the 20–15 loss to New Zealand.

== Personal life ==
Gray runs a sports recovery business called MyoMaster alongside his wife, Lottie. In March 2024, the couple appeared on British reality television business programme Dragons' Den. The couple ultimately secured an investment from former Manchester United footballer Gary Neville and British businesswoman Sara Davies.
