= Chris Robshaw =

English international rugby union player

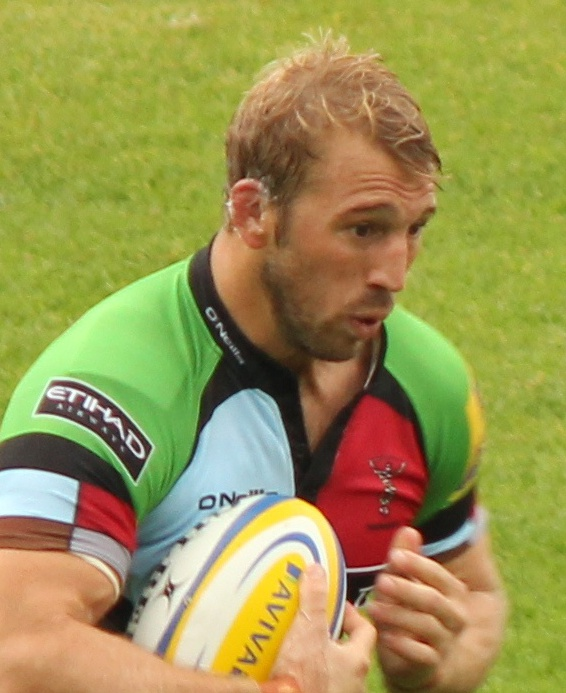
- Robshaw playing for the Harlequins (Premiership Rugby) against the Glasgow Warriors in 2013
- Born: 4 June 1986 (age 40) Redhill, Surrey, England
- Height: 1.88 m (6 ft 2 in)
- Weight: 112 kg (17 st 9 lb; 247 lb) reported in 2011
- School: Cumnor House School; Millfield Preparatory School; Millfield

Rugby union career
- Position: Flanker
Youth career
- Warlingham RFC
Senior career
Years	Team	Apps	(Points)
2005–2020	Harlequins	300	(120)
2021–2022	San Diego Legion	18	(5)
- Correct as of 26 June 2021
International career
Years	Team	Apps	(Points)
2009–2018	England	66	(10)
- Correct as of 23 June 2018

Christopher Denis Yankel Robshaw (born 4 June 1986) is an English former rugby union player. He was the captain of the England national rugby union team from January 2012 until December 2015. Robshaw's position of choice was in the back row of the scrum, usually flanker.

== Early and personal life ==
Born the second of three boys, Robshaw's father's died when he was five years old and his mother, Patricia, raised her sons alone. Robshaw started playing rugby for Warlingham RFC at the age of seven, and attended Cumnor House School in Surrey. He then moved to Millfield Preparatory School and on to Millfield public school in Glastonbury, Somerset, where he was first team captain.

He was engaged to his girlfriend of six years, Camilla Kerslake, before they married in France on 29 June 2018.

== Club career ==
=== Harlequins ===
Robshaw made his Premiership debut in the London double header at the start of the 2007–2008 season. He went on to be included in the England Saxons squad who won the Churchill Cup in the summer of 2008.

From the 2014–15 season Robshaw was the first team and club vice captain of the London-based Harlequins club; he relinquished the captaincy to Joe Marler in order to focus on his duties as England captain. Robshaw is a two-time Aviva Premiership Player of the Year winner, an award he first won following the 2008/9 season, and then again following Harlequins' title-winning campaign in 2011/12. He started and scored a try for Harlequins in their 2011–12 Premiership final victory over Leicester Tigers.

In June 2020, it was confirmed Robshaw would remain at Harlequins throughout the remainder of the elongated 2019–20 season.

=== San Diego Legion ===
He joined San Diego Legion in Major League Rugby for the 2021 and 2022 seasons.

He announced his retirement on 21 October 2022.

== International career ==
Robshaw played for England Schools Under 18 during (January) 2004, before making his First XV debut during the 2005–2006 season; scoring two tries in the 42–3 victory over the Pertemps Bees at The Stoop.

He was also part of the England Under 21 squad that competed in the 2006 Six Nations Championship and the 2006 Under 21 Rugby World Championship.

Will Greenwood declared on 12 December 2008 that Robshaw was pushing for international honours owing to his current form, and he was fighting for a place on the upcoming Lions tour to South Africa, as an "uncapped" Lion. Greenwood also went on to compare Robshaw to World Cup-winning blindside flanker Richard Hill.

Robshaw was named on 19 May 2009 in the England squad to play the Barbarians and Argentina. He played in a defeat by the Barbarians. Robshaw later replaced James Haskell in the starting line-up for the return fixture against the Argentines in Salta, Argentina, winning his debut cap in a Test match defeat by Argentina.

He was included in the England EPS Squad on 25 January 2010, owing to a knee injury sustained by Tom Croft.

Robshaw was overlooked for selection for the 2011 Rugby World Cup, despite impressing in the training camp.

In January 2012, Robshaw was announced as England captain for the first two games of the 2012 Six Nations, despite previously obtaining only a single cap. He went on to captain England throughout the rest of the tournament, featuring a clean sweep of away wins at Scotland, Italy and France, as well as a win at Twickenham against Ireland and a narrow loss to eventual Grand Slam winners Wales. He was retained as captain of the England side for their series defeat in South Africa, in which he played only two tests before fracturing his thumb. Despite defeats by both Australia and South Africa, Robshaw captained his team to victory against New Zealand at the end of 2012.

He scored his first Test try in England's 20–13 win over Australia on 2 November 2013. His second try was against Italy, in a 52–11 win, England's last game in the 2014 RBS Six Nations.

Robshaw was retained as captain for the 2015 Six Nations Championship, and played every minute of England's campaign. He was widely praised for his captaincy as England won the opening game 21–16 away in Wales, with the captain contributing a mammoth 26 tackles. However, the game started five minutes late because Robshaw engaged in a standoff in the Millennium Stadium tunnel, refusing to take his side out only to be left waiting in the cold by the Welsh. However, England fell agonisingly short of the title on the final day of the championship, beating France 55–35 whilst needing to win by 27 points. This meant England finished second for the fourth time in a row under the leadership of Robshaw and coach Stuart Lancaster.

Following England's dismal performance at the 2015 Rugby World Cup, Robshaw lost his national captaincy in January 2016 to hooker Dylan Hartley, but retained his place as a starter, but shifted to blindside flanker that year. England won the Grand Slam in 2016, and then toured Australia, whitewashing the Wallabies in the three-test series. Robshaw earned his 50th test cap and Man of the Match, as he helped England clinch the series win with a 23–7 victory in the second test.

Robshaw continued to be an integral part of the England team under Eddie Jones; although he missed England's victorious 2017 Six Nations campaign through injury, he was part of the leadership group of a largely inexperienced side that toured Argentina in 2017 – winning the series 2–0. He captained England for the final time in that year's autumn internationals, in a win against Samoa. Robshaw played his final test for England on the 2018 tour to South Africa, in winning the final test.

Injury during the 2018–19 season, the emergence of Mark Wilson, Tom Curry and Sam Underhill, saw Robshaw phased out of the team by the time of the 2019 Rugby World Cup.

He finished his international career having started all 66 of his international caps. Only Rory Underwood and Will Carling earned more starts without ever coming off the bench for England. He also finished his career with the second-most England appearances as captain (43) behind Carling (59), but is the all-time leader in the Professional era.

=== Cancellation of 2020 Barbarians vs England ===
Robshaw had been picked in the Barbarians Squad to face England on 25 October 2020 in a warm-up match before the resumption of the delayed 2019–20 Six Nations season.

12 members of the Barbarians squad including Robshaw were found to be breach of COVID-19 protocols. Following an attempt to replace these squad members and retain the fixture, another breach of the protocols came to light resulting in the complete cancellation of the fixture.

=== International tries ===
As of 7 July 2019

Try	Opposing team	Location	Venue	Competition	Date	Result	Score
1	Australia	London, England	Twickenham Stadium	2013 Autumn Internationals	2 November 2013	Win	20 – 13
2	Italy	Rome, Italy	Stadio Olimpico	2014 Six Nations	15 March 2014	Win	52 – 11

== Television appearances ==
In 2025, Robshaw was a contestant in Strictly Come Dancing series 23. He finished in 13th place after being eliminated in Week 4.
