= 2020 Rugby Europe Championship squads =

This is a list of the complete squads for the 2020 Rugby Europe Championship, an annual rugby union tournament contested by the national rugby teams of Belgium, Spain, Georgia, Portugal, Romania and Russia. Georgia are the defending champions.

Note: Number of caps and players' ages are indicated as of 1 February 2020 – the tournament's opening day.

== Belgium ==
On 20 January 2020, Guillaume Ajac named a 48-man squad for the 2020 Rugby Europe Championship.

Head coach: (France) Guillaume Ajac

Player	Position	Date of birth (age)	Caps	Club/province
**Alexis Cuffolo**	Hooker	13 June 1991 (aged 28)	15	(Belgium) Rugby Coq Mosan
Thomas Dienst	Hooker	19 January 1987 (aged 33)	50	(France) Stade Blayais
Martin Jenssens	Hooker	10 September 1998 (aged 21)	0	(France) US Carcassonne Espoirs
Vincent Tauzia	Hooker	17 July 1992 (aged 27)	3	(France) RC Clermont Cournon d'Auvergne
Charlesty Berguet	Prop	13 January 2000 (aged 20)	0	(France) USA Perpignan Espoirs
Bastien Gallaire	Prop	29 March 1999 (aged 20)	6	(France) Rugby Club Suresnes
**Julien Massimi**	Prop	19 July 1984 (aged 35)	11	(Belgium) ASUB Waterloo
**Maxime Jadot**	Prop	6 January 1991 (aged 29)	14	(France) Stade Dijonnais
Romain Pinte	Prop	28 July 1991 (aged 28)	11	(Belgium) Rugby Ottignies Club
Lucas Sotteau	Prop	30 August 1996 (aged 23)	9	(France) US Dax
Ayrton Stainer	Prop		0	(Belgium) ASUB Waterloo
Bruno Vliegen	Prop	3 July 2001 (aged 18)	0	(France) Clermont Auvergne Espoirs
**Bertrand Billi**	Lock	2 January 1987 (aged 33)	16	(Belgium) RC Soignies
Brieuc Corradi	Lock	26 October 1994 (aged 25)	5	(France) Beauvais RC
Tom Herenger	Lock	12 February 1996 (aged 23)	6	(France) SAT Rugby Trélissac
Guillaume Mortier	Lock	24 January 1984 (aged 36)	2	(France) Angoulême
**Mathieu Verschelden**	Lock	13 May 1988 (aged 31)	10	(Belgium) ASUB Waterloo
Michael Abrahams	Back row		0	(Belgium) Royal Kituro
Gillian Benoy	Back row	8 May 1995 (aged 24)	15	(France) Rugby Club Suresnes
William van Bost	Back row	1 August 1998 (aged 21)	2	(France) Béziers Hérault Espoirs
Keran Caro	Back row		2	(Belgium) RC La Hulpe
Lucas de Connick	Back row	15 January 1996 (aged 24)	0	(France) Montpellier Hérault
Nick Cording	Back row	15 August 1990 (aged 29)	0	(Belgium) Dendermonde RC
Jean Maurice Deccuber	Back row	10 September 1996 (aged 23)	3	(France) US Cognac
**Thomas de Molder**	Back row	22 June 1992 (aged 27)	17	(France) US Tyrosse
Amin Hamzaoui	Back row	7 May 1996 (aged 23)	9	(France) Rugby Chartres
Romain Honhon	Back row		1	(Belgium) Rugby Ottignies Club
Gonzalo Moreno	Back row		0	(Belgium) RC La Hulpe
**Julien Berger** (c)	Scrum-half	10 January 1990 (aged 30)	12	(France) USON Nevers
Tom Cocqu	Scrum-half		12	(France) Rugby Chartres
Gauthier Petit	Scrum-half		0	(Republic of Ireland) Rugby Academy Ireland
Ryan Godsmark	Fly-half	10 April 1992 (aged 27)	0	(Belgium) RC La Hulpe
Lépold Roobaert	Fly-half		0	(Belgium) Boitsfort RC
Antoine Vassart	Fly-half	16 January 1985 (aged 35)	1	(Belgium) RC La Hulpe
Nathan Bontems	Centre	22 July 1994 (aged 25)	9	(France) Beauvais RC
Dazzy Cornez	Centre		1	(Belgium) Le Creusot
Louis Debatty	Centre	15 July 1993 (aged 26)	9	(Belgium) RC Soignies
Louis de Moffarts	Centre		4	(Belgium) RC La Hulpe
Florian Piron	Centre	24 September 1991 (aged 28)	4	(France) ÉS Catalane
**Guillaume Piron**	Centre	9 April 1992 (aged 27)	18	(France) Blagnac SCR
Craig Dowsett	Wing	1 January 1991 (aged 29)	10	(England) Blackheath F.C.
Thomas Walraff	Wing	27 October 1997 (aged 22)	10	(France) USON Nevers Espoirs
Cédric Wieme	Wing	20 June 1999 (aged 20)	0	(France) FC Grenoble Espoirs
Ervin Muric	Wing	3 March 1997 (aged 22)	9	(England) Hartpury College R.F.C.
Marc Tchangue	Wing		4	(France) ÉS Catalane
Gaspard Lalli	Fullback		0	(Belgium) RC La Hulpe
Charles Reynaerts	Fullback	28 September 1995 (aged 24)	9	(France) Valence Romans
Alan Williams	Fullback	11 December 1987 (aged 32)	51	(Belgium) RC Soignies

Note – Players in bold have played more matches than shown above but there is no information of Belgium caps pre-2013.

== Georgia ==
On 17 January 2020, Levan Maisashvili named his 34-man squad for the 2020 Rugby Europe Championship.

Head coach: (Georgia (country)) Levan Maisashvili (interim)

Player	Position	Date of birth (age)	Caps	Club/province
Giorgi Chkoidze	Hooker	17 May 1991 (aged 28)	6	(Russia) Locomotiv Penza
Vano Karkadze	Hooker	25 June 2000 (aged 19)	4	(France) Brive
Shalva Mamukashvili	Hooker	2 October 1990 (aged 29)	71	(Georgia (country)) RC Kochebi Bolnisi
Levan Chilachava	Prop	17 August 1991 (aged 28)	52	(France) Montpellier Hérault
Beka Gigashvili	Prop	17 February 1992 (aged 27)	12	(France) RC Toulon
Guram Gogichashvili	Prop	4 September 1998 (aged 21)	10	(France) Racing 92
Giorgi Melikidze	Prop	24 June 1996 (aged 23)	16	(France) Stade Français
Mikheil Nariashvili (c)	Prop	25 May 1990 (aged 29)	59	(France) Montpellier Hérault
Giorgi Tetrashvili	Prop	31 August 1993 (aged 26)	9	(France) SU Agen
Davit Gigauri	Lock	3 April 1994 (aged 25)	3	(France) US Colomiers
Lasha Jaiani	Lock	21 April 1998 (aged 21)	0	(England) Exeter University
Konstantin Mikautadze	Lock	1 July 1991 (aged 28)	63	(France) Montpellier Hérault
Shalva Sutiashvili	Lock	24 January 1984 (aged 36)	79	(France) Angoulême
Nodar Tcheishvili	Lock	13 November 1990 (aged 29)	22	(England) London Scottish
Mikheil Gachechiladze	Back row	24 December 1990 (aged 29)	8	(Russia) Enisey-STM
Otar Giorgadze	Back row	2 March 1996 (aged 23)	25	(France) Brive
Beka Gorgadze	Back row	8 February 1996 (aged 23)	23	(France) Bordeaux Bègles
Beka Saghinadze	Back row	29 October 1998 (aged 21)	9	(France) Aurillac
Giorgi Tkhilaishvili	Back row	8 April 1991 (aged 28)	54	(Georgia (country)) Batumi RC
Giorgi Tsutskiridze	Back row	26 November 1996 (aged 23)	18	(France) Aurillac
Gela Aprasidze	Scrum-half	14 January 1998 (aged 22)	21	(France) Montpellier Hérault
Giorgi Begadze	Scrum-half	4 March 1986 (aged 33)	65	(Georgia (country)) Jiki Gori
Vasil Lobzhanidze	Scrum-half	14 October 1996 (aged 23)	49	(France) Brive
Tedo Abzhandadze	Fly-half	13 June 1999 (aged 20)	11	(France) Brive
Lasha Malaghuradze	Fly-half	2 January 1986 (aged 34)	95	(Russia) VVA-Podmoskovye
Davit Kacharava	Centre	16 January 1985 (aged 35)	119	(Russia) Enisey-STM
Giorgi Kveseladze	Centre	11 November 1997 (aged 22)	24	(Georgia (country)) Jiki Gori
Demur Tapladze	Centre	18 March 2000 (aged 19)	0	(Georgia (country)) Lelo Saracens
Zurab Dzneladze	Wing	23 November 1992 (aged 27)	10	(Georgia (country)) RC Locomotiv Tbilisi
Tamaz Mchedlidze	Wing	17 March 1993 (aged 26)	55	(France) Rouen
Mirian Modebadze	Wing	27 October 1997 (aged 22)	12	(Georgia (country)) AIA Kutaisi
Alexander Todua	Wing	2 November 1987 (aged 32)	82	(Georgia (country)) Batumi RC
Lasha Khmaladze	Fullback	20 January 1988 (aged 32)	79	(Georgia (country)) Batumi RC
Soso Matiashvili	Fullback	27 January 1993 (aged 27)	23	(Georgia (country)) Lelo Saracens

Call-ups
On 5 February, Akaki Tabutsatde was called up to replace Mirian Modebadze and Giorgi Kveseladze due to minor injuries whereas Konstantin Mikautadze left the squad due to club commitments.

On 16 February, Lasha Tabidze was called up into the squad while Levan Chilachava, Beka Gigashvili, Mikheil Nariashvili and Vasil Lobzhanidze leave the squad for the less-experienced players to play. Also, Tornike Jalaghonia was called up to replace Otar Giorgadze who left the squad as well due to a minor injury.

Player	Position	Date of birth (age)	Caps	Club/province
Lasha Tabidze	Prop	31 August 1993 (aged 26)	4	(France) Union Bordeaux Bègles
Tornike Jalaghonia	Back row	2 March 1996 (aged 23)	0	(France) Biarritz Olympique
Akaki Tabutsatde	Wing	1 January 1998 (aged 22)	0	(Georgia (country)) Lelo Saracens

== Portugal ==
On 29 January 2020, Patrice Lagisquet named his 26-man squad for the 2020 Rugby Europe Championship.

Head coach: (France) Patrice Lagisquet

Note: Flags indicate national union for the club/province as defined by World Rugby.

Player	Position	Date of birth (age)	Caps	Club/province
Rodrigo Bento	Hooker	18 May 1999 (aged 20)	0	(Portugal) Técnico
Lionel Campergue	Hooker	24 November 1987 (aged 32)	9	(France) Cognac
Francisco Bruno	Prop	28 May 1995 (aged 24)	22	(Portugal) Direito
João Vasco Côrte-Real	Prop	17 April 1993 (aged 26)	24	(Portugal) CDUP
Diogo Hasse Ferreira	Prop	17 October 1996 (aged 23)	8	(Spain) Aparejadores
Ivo Morais	Prop	21 September 1984 (aged 35)	1	(France) Châteaurenard
José Madeira	Lock	19 March 2001 (aged 18)	2	(Portugal) Belenenses
José Rebelo de Andrade	Lock	24 November 1997 (aged 22)	7	(England) Nottingham Trent University
Duarte Torgal	Lock	23 December 1997 (aged 22)	3	(Portugal) Direito
David Wallis	Lock	17 April 1997 (aged 22)	5	(Portugal) Belenenses
Thibault de Freitas	Back row	8 January 1992 (aged 28)	5	(France) Blagnac
João Granate	Back row	21 February 1997 (aged 22)	8	(Portugal) Direito
João Moreira	Back row	2 October 1994 (aged 25)	5	(Portugal) Agronomia
Manuel Picão	Back row	10 April 1997 (aged 22)	8	(Portugal) Académica
Duarte Azevedo	Scrum-half	16 October 1998 (aged 21)	3	(Portugal) Belenenses
Jorge Abecasis	Scrum-half	25 May 1997 (aged 22)	9	(Portugal) CDUL
João Belo	Scrum-half	2 August 1995 (aged 24)	12	(Portugal) CDUL
Pedro Lucas	Scrum-half	16 October 2000 (aged 19)	0	(Portugal) Técnico
João Lima	Fly-half	28 August 1998 (aged 21)	3	(Portugal) Agronomia
Jerónimo Portela	Fly-half	2 November 2000 (aged 19)	2	(Uruguay) Peñarol
António Vidinha	Centre	29 December 1997 (aged 22)	11	(Portugal) Cascais
Tomás Appleton (c)	Centre	29 July 1993 (aged 26)	34	(Portugal) CDUL
Dany Antunes	Wing	15 September 1997 (aged 22)	2	(France) Massy
José Vareta	Wing	5 August 1994 (aged 25)	5	(Portugal) Direito
Manuel Cardoso Pinto	Fullback	7 April 1998 (aged 21)	7	(Portugal) Agronomia
João Freudenthal	Fullback	28 December 1995 (aged 24)	2	(Portugal) Belenenses

Note – Jorge Abecasis has been added to the squad on the 31 January 2020.

== Romania ==
On 29 January 2020, Andy Robinson named a 33-man squad for the 2020 Rugby Europe Championship.

Head coach: (England) Andy Robinson

Note: Flags indicate national union for the club/province as defined by World Rugby.

Player	Position	Date of birth (age)	Caps	Club/province
Tudor Butnariu	Hooker	12 March 1994 (aged 25)	0	(Romania) Steaua București
Eugen Căpățână	Hooker	18 June 1986 (aged 33)	44	(Romania) Timișoara Saracens
Ovidiu Cojocaru	Hooker	19 November 1996 (aged 23)	8	(Romania) CSM Baia Mare
Iulian Hartig	Prop	11 October 1998 (aged 21)	3	(Romania) CSM Baia Mare
Constantin Pristăviță	Prop	23 May 1993 (aged 26)	41	(Romania) CSM Baia Mare
Horațiu Pungea	Prop	18 February 1986 (aged 33)	30	(Romania) Timișoara Saracens
Cosmin Manole	Prop	22 October 1995 (aged 24)	3	(Romania) Dinamo București
Alexandru Țăruș	Prop	9 May 1989 (aged 30)	33	(Italy) Zebre
Dorin Lazăr	Lock	23 January 1990 (aged 30)	21	(Romania) Timișoara Saracens
Adrian Moțoc	Lock	11 July 1996 (aged 23)	6	(France) SU Agen
Ionuț Mureșan	Lock	6 October 1994 (aged 25)	7	(Romania) Timișoara Saracens
Johannes van Heerden	Lock	9 December 1986 (aged 33)	40	(Romania) Dinamo București
Cristi Chirică	Back row	9 April 1997 (aged 22)	11	(Romania) CSM Baia Mare
Adrian Ion	Back row	9 August 1986 (aged 33)	12	(Romania) Tomitanii Constanța
Vlad Neculau	Back row	7 January 1998 (aged 22)	2	(Romania) Timișoara Saracens
Dragoș Ser	Back row	4 March 1999 (aged 20)	0	(Romania) Steaua București
Kamil Sobota	Back row	31 January 1992 (aged 28)	0	(Romania) Tomitanii Constanța
Tudorel Bratu	Scrum-half	23 April 1991 (aged 28)	9	(Romania) Dinamo București
Gabriel Rupanu	Scrum-half	28 September 1997 (aged 22)	1	(Romania) Timișoara Saracens
Florin Surugiu	Scrum-half	10 December 1984 (aged 35)	80	(Romania) Steaua București
Daniel Plai	Fly-half	5 September 1994 (aged 25)	9	(Romania) Steaua București
Tudor Boldor	Fly-half	29 November 1997 (aged 22)	2	(Romania) Steaua București
Alexandru Bucur	Centre	24 April 1994 (aged 25)	4	(Romania) CSM Baia Mare
Cătălin Fercu	Centre	5 September 1986 (aged 33)	107	(Romania) Timișoara Saracens
Taylor Gontineac	Centre	16 July 2000 (aged 19)	2	(France) Clermont Espoirs
Vlăduț Popa	Centre	27 March 1996 (aged 23)	10	(Romania) Timișoara Saracens
Florin Vlaicu	Centre	26 July 1986 (aged 33)	120	(Romania) Steaua București
Ionuț Dumitru	Wing	6 November 1992 (aged 27)	40	(Romania) Steaua București
Robert Neagu	Wing	20 July 1991 (aged 28)	4	(Romania) Steaua București
Nicolas Onuțu	Wing	27 December 1995 (aged 24)	8	(France) CS Vienne
Marius Simionescu	Wing	5 September 1997 (aged 22)	10	(Romania) Timișoara Saracens
Ionel Melinte	Fullback	31 January 1996 (aged 24)	6	(Romania) Timișoara Saracens
Paul Popoaia	Fullback	29 May 2000 (aged 19)	0	(Romania) CSM Baia Mare

Call-ups
On 3 February, Ionel Badiu, Costel Burțilă and Mihai Macovei were called up to replace Horațiu Pungea, Cosmin Manole, Vlad Neculau, Alexandru Bucur and Cătălin Fercu due to a contagious flu.

On 14 February, Horațiu Pungea, Cosmin Manole, Vlad Neculau and Cătălin Fercu have been re-called after having the flu along with Alexandru Savin, Marius Iftimiciuc Valentin Popârlan, Florian Roșu and Moa Mua Maliepo being called up for the first time this season to replace Ionel Badiu, Iulian Hartig and Țăruș.

Player	Position	Date of birth (age)	Caps	Club/province
Ionel Badiu	Prop	29 July 1989 (aged 30)	21	(France) CSM Valence Romans
Costel Burțilă	Prop	14 July 1991 (aged 28)	0	(France) RC Hyères-Carqueiranne-La Crau
Alexandru Savin	Prop	12 February 1995 (aged 24)	5	(Romania) CSA Steaua București
Marius Iftimiciuc	Lock	13 August 1997 (aged 22)	0	(Romania) Timișoara Saracens
Valentin Popârlan	Lock	12 June 1987 (aged 32)	75	(Romania) Timișoara Saracens
Florian Roșu	Lock	20 April 1992 (aged 27)	0	(Romania) CSM Baia Mare
Moa Mua Maliepo	Centre	12 May 1996 (aged 23)	0	(Romania) Timișoara Saracens
Mihai Macovei (c)	Back row	29 October 1986 (aged 33)	85	(France) US Colomiers

== Russia ==
On 21 January 2020, Lyn Jones announced a 32-man squad for the 2020 Rugby Europe Championship.

Head coach: (Wales) Lyn Jones

Note: Flags indicate national union for the club/province as defined by World Rugby.

Player	Position	Date of birth (age)	Caps	Club/province
Sergey Chernyshev	Hooker	13 May 1988 (age 37)	11	(Russia) Slava Moskva
Evgeny Matveev	Hooker	15 April 1985 (aged 34)	61	(Russia) VVA-Podmoskovye
Stanislav Sel'skiy	Hooker	2 September 1991 (aged 28)	39	(Russia) Enisey-STM
Azamat Bitiev	Prop	9 December 1989 (aged 30)	22	(Russia) Krasny Yar
Kirill Gotovtsev	Prop	17 July 1987 (aged 32)	7	(Russia) Krasny Yar
Vladimir Podrezov	Prop	27 January 1994 (aged 26)	27	(Russia) VVA-Podmoskovye
Andrey Polivalov	Prop	9 August 1986 (aged 33)	28	(Russia) VVA-Podmoskovye
Stepan Seryakov	Prop	26 September 1997 (aged 22)	0	(Russia) Enisey-STM
Bogdan Fedotko	Lock	22 September 1994 (aged 25)	24	(Russia) Krasny Yar
Andrey Garbuzov (c)	Lock	7 August 1983 (aged 36)	98	(Russia) VVA-Podmoskovye
Evgeny Mishechkin	Lock	27 July 1997 (aged 22)	11	(Russia) Slava Moskva
Yegor Zykov	Lock	11 January 1993 (aged 27)	0	(Russia) VVA-Podmoskovye
Victor Gresev	Back row	31 March 1986 (aged 33)	99	(Russia) Locomotiv Penza
Alexsandr Il`in	Back row	7 November 1997 (aged 22)	11	(Russia) Krasny Yar
Tagir Gadzhiev	Back row	29 March 1994 (aged 25)	31	(Russia) VVA-Podmoskovye
Anton Sychev	Back row	5 February 1994 (aged 25)	18	(Russia) Metallurg
Nikita Vavilin	Back row	13 May 1994 (aged 25)	13	(Russia) Slava Moskva
Vitaly Zhivatov	Back row	16 February 1992 (aged 27)	12	(Russia) VVA-Podmoskovye
Vasily Dorofeev	Scrum-half	6 August 1990 (aged 29)	24	(Russia) Krasny Yar
Stepan Khokhlov	Scrum-half	9 May 1998 (aged 21)	0	(Russia) Slava Moskva
Aleksey Shcherban	Scrum-half	17 November 1990 (aged 29)	46	(Russia) Enisey-STM
Yuri Kushnarev	Fly-half	6 June 1985 (aged 34)	112	(Russia) Krasny Yar
Sergey Yanyushkin	Fly-half	16 November 1986 (aged 33)	17	(Russia) Locomotiv Penza
Dmitry Gerasimov	Centre	16 April 1988 (aged 31)	67	(Russia) Enisey-STM
Kirill Golosnitsky	Centre	30 May 1994 (aged 25)	12	(Russia) VVA-Podmoskovye
Daniil Potikhanov	Centre	30 November 1999 (aged 20)	0	(Russia) VVA-Podmoskovye
Stanislav Bondarev	Wing	29 September 1988 (aged 31)	0	(Russia) RC Kuban
German Davydov	Wing	10 March 1994 (aged 25)	21	(Russia) VVA-Podmoskovye
Khetag Dzobelov	Wing		0	(Russia) VVA-Podmoskovye
Vladislav Sozonov	Wing	9 October 1993 (aged 26)	11	(Russia) VVA-Podmoskovye
Vasily Artemyev	Fullback	24 July 1987 (aged 32)	90	(Russia) CSKA Moscow
Ramil Gaisin	Fullback	26 July 1991 (aged 28)	48	(Russia) Enisey-STM

Call-ups
On 28 January, Evgeny Elgin was called up to replace Alexsandr Il`in (who will remain in the squad for the match versus Belgium) for the match versus Spain due to a minor injury sustained by Alexsandr Il`in.

On 29 January, Shamil Magomedov and Patris Peki were called up to replace the players Tagir Gadzhiev and Bogdan Fedotko due to injuries accumulated during training.

On 4 February, Alexey Scobyola was called up to replace Andrey Polivalov while Tagir Gadzhiev and Stanislav Sel'skiy left the squad due to injuries accumulated during the opening match against Spain.

On 6 February, Valery Morozov was called up for the match against Belgium.

On 14 February, Nikita Churashov, German Godlyuk, Roman Khodin, Dennis Mashkin, Andrei Ostrikov and Konstantin Uzunov were called up for the match against Portugal to replace Stepan Seryakov Sergey Chernyshev, Vasily Dorofeev, Nikita Vavilin and Khetag Dzobelov whilst Aleksandr Il`in, Alexei Shcherban and Yuri Kushnarev left the squad due to injuries from the previous match versus Belgium.

Player	Position	Date of birth (age)	Caps	Club/province
Shamil Magomedov	Hooker	17 April 1987 (aged 32)	2	(Russia) Enisey-STM
Denis Mashkin	Hooker	19 February 1997 (aged 22)	0	(Russia) Enisey-STM
Valery Morozov	Prop	21 September 1995 (aged 24)	21	(England) Sale Sharks
Alexey Scobyola	Prop	8 August 1991 (aged 28)	0	(Russia) Slava Moskva
Evgeny Elgin	Lock	10 March 1987 (aged 32)	26	(Russia) Enisey-STM
Roman Khodin	Lock	6 September 1994 (aged 25)	5	(Russia) VVA-Podmoskovye
Andrei Ostrikov	Lock	2 July 1987 (aged 32)	37	(France) FC Grenoble
Patris Peki	Back row	10 October 1995 (aged 24)	2	(Russia) VVA-Podmoskovye
Nikita Churashov	Fly-half	11 February 1996 (aged 23)	1	(Russia) Enisey-STM
Konstantin Uzunov	Wing	19 April 1994 (aged 25)	14	(Russia) Enisey-STM
German Godlyuk	Fullback	11 August 1992 (aged 27)	2	(Russia) Strela Kazan

== Spain ==
On 20 January 2020, Santiago Santos named a 31-man squad for the 2020 Rugby Europe Championship.

Head coach: (Spain) Santiago Santos

Note: Flags indicate national union for the club/province as defined by World Rugby.

Player	Position	Date of birth (age)	Caps	Club/province
Vicente del hoyo Portoles	Hooker	5 February 1996 (aged 23)	6	(Spain) CR El Salvador
Matthew Bebe Smith	Hooker	10 April 1990 (aged 29)	0	(Spain) CR El Salvador
Alberto Alonso Blanco	Prop	8 October 1990 (aged 29)	17	(Spain) VRAC
Thierry Futeu	Prop	23 June 1995 (aged 24)	4	(France) Stade Français
Fernando Martín López	Prop	14 March 1986 (age 39)	42	(Spain) Ordizia RE
Jon Zabala	Prop	26 November 1996 (aged 23)	9	(France) Anglet Olympique
Ien Leight-Ashcroft	Lock	8 September 1987 (aged 32)	3	(Spain) CD Aparejadores
Victor Sánchez Borrego	Lock	20 June 1987 (aged 32)	18	(Spain) CR El Salvador
Michael Walker-Fitton	Lock	2 October 1986 (aged 33)	9	(Spain) CR El Salvador
Lucas Guillaume	Lock	15 April 1991 (aged 28)	16	(France) SC Albi
Gautier Gibouin (c)	Back row	24 March 1991 (aged 28)	41	(France) USON Nevers
Juan Pablo Guido	Back row	23 September 1990 (aged 29)	4	(Spain) CD Aparejadores
Michael Sequoia Hogg	Back row	10 July 1991 (aged 28)	5	(Spain) FC Barcelona
Nathan Paila	Back row	28 May 1991 (aged 28)	1	(Spain) VRAC
Fréderic Quercy	Back row	6 July 1991 (aged 28)	4	(France) USON Nevers
Lionel Tauli	Back row	29 April 1990 (aged 29)	9	(Spain) UE Santboiana
Kerman Aurrekoetxea	Scrum-half	4 May 2000 (aged 19)	1	(France) Biarritz Olympique
Guillaume Rouet	Scrum-half	13 August 1988 (aged 31)	19	(France) Bayonne
Lucas Rubio	Scrum-half	29 May 1991 (aged 28)	7	Un-attached
Brad Linklater	Fly-half	16 May 1985 (aged 34)	28	(Spain) Alcobendas Rugby
Gonzalo Vinuesa	Fly-half	15 May 2001 (aged 18)	0	(Spain) CR Cisneros
Thibault Álvarez	Centre	10 June 1990 (aged 29)	19	(France) Blagnac SCR
Pierre Nueno	Centre	15 May 1995 (aged 24)	0	(France) Section Paloise
Andrea Rabago	Centre	13 May 1996 (aged 23)	9	(France) Stade Dijonnais
Richard Stewart	Centre	4 November 1990 (aged 29)	10	(Spain) Alcobendas Rugby
Ignacio Contardi	Wing	8 March 1991 (aged 28)	32	(Spain) Independiente RC
Julen Goia	Wing	12 December 1991 (aged 28)	26	(Spain) Ordizia RE
Jordi Jorba	Wing	8 May 1997 (aged 22)	21	(France) Ceret Sportif
Gauthier Minguillon	Wing	3 March 1994 (aged 25)	7	(France) Stade Aurillac
JW Bell	Fullback	18 January 1990 (aged 30)	1	(Spain) VRAC
Guilellermo Dominigues	Fullback	31 January 1997 (aged 23)	0	(Spain) Alcobendas Rugby

Call-ups
On 3 February, Marco Pinto Ferrer, Asier Usarraga and Charly Malie, Tomás Munilla and Martín Alonso were called up to replace Matthew Bebe Smith, Michael Sequoia Hogg, Kerman Aurrekoetxea and Gauthier Minguillon.

On 17 February, José Díaz and Nicolás Jurado were called up to replace Fernando Martín López who sustained an injury in the previous match versus Georgia along with Manuel Mora, Álvar Gimeno, Nicolás Nieto, Federico Castiglioni, Baltazar Taibo and Sergio Molinero also joining the squad while Ien-Leight Ashcroft, Charly Malie and Guillaume Rouet left the squad due to club commitments. Also Jordi Jorba leaves the squad due to a major injury sustained in the opening match.

Player	Position	Date of birth (age)	Caps	Club/province
Marco Pinto Ferrer	Hooker	11 November 1987 (aged 32)	20	(France) AS Béziers
José Díaz	Prop	22 June 1998 (aged 21)	0	(Spain) VRAC
Nicolás Jurado	Prop	14 December 1998 (aged 21)	1	(Spain) CR El Salvador
Manuel Mora	Lock	8 March 1985 (aged 34)	19	(Spain) Independiente RC
Josh Peters	Lock	12 October 1995 (aged 24)	5	(England) Blackheath F.C.
Asier Usarraga	Back row	31 December 1994 (aged 25)	6	(France) Biarritz Olympique
Charly Malie	Scrum-half	5 November 1991 (aged 28)	12	(France) Section Paloise
Tomás Munilla	Scrum-half	3 August 1998 (aged 21)	5	(France) AS Béziers
Álvar Gimeno	Centre	15 December 1997 (aged 22)	18	(France) AS Béziers
Nicolás Nieto	Centre	17 March 1995 (aged 24)	0	(Spain) Independiente RC
Martín Alonso	Wing	2 December 1999 (aged 20)	0	(France) Stade Rochelais
Federico Castiglioni	Wing	10 August 1990 (aged 29)	26	(Spain) Independiente RC
Baltazar Taibo	Wing	30 January 1997 (aged 23)	0	(Spain) VRAC
Sergio Molinero	Fullback	4 July 2000 (aged 19)	0	(Spain) CD Aparejadores
