= 2020 Rugby Europe Championship =

- Date: 1 February 2020 – 7 February 2021
- Countries: Belgium; Georgia; Portugal; Romania; Russia; Spain

Tournament statistics
- Champions: Georgia (12th title)
- Grand Slam: Georgia (9th title)
- Antim Cup: Georgia (13th title)
- Matches played: 12
- Attendance: 67,792 (5,649 per match)
- Official website: Rugby Europe International Championships

The 2020 Rugby Europe Championship is the fourth season of the Rugby Europe International Championships, the premier rugby union competition for European national teams outside the Six Nations Championship. The competing teams are Belgium, Georgia, Romania, Russia and Spain (the top five teams from 2019), and Portugal, who qualified after defeating Germany in the promotion/relegation play-off of the 2019 Championship.

== Participants ==
Nation	Stadium			Head coach	Captain
Nation	Home stadium	Capacity	Location	Head coach	Captain
Belgium	Stade Communal Fallon	2,500	Brussels	(France) Frédéric Cocqu	Julien Berger
Georgia	Boris Paichadze Dinamo Arena; Mikheil Meskhi Stadium; Aia Arena	54,600; 27,223; 5,000	Tbilisi; Tbilisi; Kutaisi	(Georgia (country)) Levan Maisashvili (interim)	Merab Sharikadze
Portugal	Estádio Universitário de Lisboa; Complexo Desportivo da Caldas da Rainha; Stade Jean-Bouin	8,000; 3,250; 20,000	Lisbon; Caldas da Rainha; Paris	(France) Patrice Lagisquet	Tomás Appleton
Romania	Stadionul Municipal; Stadionul Ion Oblemenco	7,782; 30,983	Botoșani; Craiova	(England) Andy Robinson	Mihai Macovei
Russia	Fisht Olympic Stadium; Kaliningrad Stadium; Kuban Stadium	47,659; 35,212; 35,200	Sochi; Kaliningrad; Krasnodar	(Wales) Lyn Jones	Andrey Garbuzov
Spain	Estadio Nacional Complutense	12,400	Madrid	(Spain) Santiago Santos	Gauthier Gibouin

== Table ==
Champions
Advances to promotion/relegation play-off

Place	Nation	Games				Points			Tries			TBP	LBP	GS	Table points
Place	Nation	Played	Won	Drawn	Lost	For	Against	Diff	For	Against	Diff	TBP	LBP	GS	Table points
1	Georgia	5	5	0	0	197	60	+137	28	7	+21	3	0	1	24
2	Spain	5	3	0	2	103	93	+10	14	8	+6	1	0	0	13
3	Romania	5	2	0	3	101	82	+19	7	14	−7	1	1	0	10
4	Portugal	5	2	0	3	98	111	-13	11	14	−3	0	1	0	9
5	Russia	5	2	0	3	82	128	−46	10	15	−5	0	0	0	8
6	Belgium	5	1	0	4	84	171	−87	9	21	−12	1	2	0	7
Source: Points were awarded to the teams as follows: Win – 4 points | Draw – 2 points | At least 3 more tries than opponent – 1 point | Loss within 7 points – 1 point | Loss greater than 7 points – 0 points | Completing a Grand Slam – 1 point

== Fixtures ==
=== Week 1 ===
1 February 2020
14:00 MSK (UTC+03)

Russia	12–31	Spain (1 TBP)
Try: Gaisin (2) 4' c, 73' m Con: Gaisin (1/2)	RE Report; WR Report	Try: Sánchez Borrego 37' c Jorba 40' c Del Hoyo Portoles 45' m Linklater 76' m Quercy 80' c Con: Linklater (2/4); Rabago (1/1)

Fisht Stadium, Sochi
Attendance: 8,237
Referee: Andrea Piardi (Italy)

Team details

LP	1	Andrey Polivalov	(substituted off) 55'
HK	2	Stanislav Sel'skiy	(substituted off) 58'
TP	3	Vladimir Podrezov	(substituted off) 66'
LL	4	Yegor Zykov
RL	5	Andrey Garbuzov	(substituted off) 67'
BF	6	Nikita Vavilin
OF	7	Vitaly Zhivatov	(substituted off) 66'
N8	8	Victor Gresev
SH	9	Vasily Dorofeev	(substituted off) 58'
FH	10	Ramil Gaisin
LW	11	Daniil Potikhanov	(substituted off) 52'
IC	12	Kirill Golosnitsky
OC	13	Dmitry Gerasimov	(substituted off) 64'
RW	14	German Davydov
FB	15	Vasily Artemyev (c)
Replacements:
HK	16	Evgeny Matveev	(substituted on) 58'
LK	17	Evgeny Mishechkin	(substituted on) 55'
PR	18	Azamat Bitiev	(substituted on) 66'
LK	19	Evgeny Elgin	(substituted on) 67'
FL	20	Anton Sychev	(substituted on) 66'
SH	21	Aleksey Shcherban	(substituted on) 58'
FH	22	Yuri Kushnarev	(substituted on) 64'
WG	23	Vladislav Sozonov	(substituted on) 52'
Coach:
Lyn Jones

LP	1	Fernando Martín López (c)	(substituted off) 57'
HK	2	Vicente del Hoyo Portoles	(substituted off) 75'
TP	3	Alberto Alonso Blanco	(substituted off) 41'
LL	4	Lucas Guillaume
RL	5	Michael Walkter-Fitton	(substituted off) 41'
BF	6	Victor Sánchez Borrego
OF	7	Gautier Gibouin	(substituted off) 70'
N8	8	Lionel Tauli	(substituted off) 64'
SH	9	Guillaume Rouet
FH	10	Brad Linklater
LW	11	Jordi Jorba	(substituted off) 52'
IC	12	Thibault Álvarez	(substituted off) 41'
OC	13	Richard Stewart
RW	14	Ignacio Contardi	(substituted off) 61'
FB	15	J. W. Bell
Replacements:
PR	16	Thierry Futeu	(substituted on) 57'
HK	17	Matthew Bebe Smith	(substituted on) 75'
PR	18	Jon Zabala	(substituted on) 41'
N8	19	Nathan Paila	(substituted on) 64'
FL	20	Fréderic Quercy	(substituted on) 41'
SH	21	Lucas Rubio	(substituted on) 61'
CE	22	Andrea Rabago	(substituted on) 41'
WG	23	Julen Goia	(substituted on) 70'
Coach:
Santiago Santos

Touch judges:
Federico Boraso (Italy)
Emanuele Tomo (Italy)

1 February 2020
15:00 WET (UTC+00)

Portugal	23–17	Belgium (1 LBP)
Try: Cardoso Pinto 13' c Vareta 33' c Con: Antunes (2/2); Pen: Antunes (3/3)	RE Report; WR Report	Try: Penalty try 43'; De Molder 52' c Con: Williams (1/1); Pen: Williams (1/1)

Estádio Universitário de Lisboa, Lisbon
Attendance: 955
Referee: Sam Grove-White (Scotland)

Team details

LP	1	Ivo Morais	(substituted off) 56'
HK	2	Lionel Campergue
TP	3	Diogo Hasse Ferreira
LL	4	José Madeira
RL	5	José Rebelo de Andrade	(substituted off) 52'
BF	6	David Wallis
OF	7	João Granate
N8	8	Thibault de Freitas	(substituted off) 72'
SH	9	João Belo	(substituted off) 76'
FH	10	João Lima
LW	11	José Vareta	(substituted off) 39'
IC	12	Tomás Appleton (c)
OC	13	António Vidinha
RW	14	Dany Antunes
FB	15	Manuel Cardoso Pinto
Replacements:
PR	16	Francisco Bruno	(substituted on) 56'
HK	17	Rodrigo Bento
LK	18	Duarte Torgal	(substituted on) 52'
FL	19	Manuel Picão	(substituted on) 72'
SH	20	Duarte Azevedo	(substituted on) 76'
SH	21	Jorge Abecasis
FB	22	João Freudenthal	(substituted on) 39'
PR	23	João Vasco Côrte-Real
Coach:
Patrice Lagisquet

LP	1	Bastien Gallaire	(substituted off) 53'
HK	2	Thomas Dienst	(substituted off) 53'
TP	3	Maxime Jadot	(substituted off) 66'
LL	4	Guillaume Mortier	(substituted off) 51'
RL	5	Mathieu Verschelden	(substituted off) 40'
BF	6	Lucas de Connick
OF	7	Jean Maurice Deccuber	(substituted off) 71'
N8	8	Gillian Benoy
SH	9	Julien Berger (c)	(substituted off) 74'
FH	10	Ryan Godsmark
LW	11	Gaspard Lalli
IC	12	Guillaume Piron	(substituted off) 46'
OC	13	Nathan Bontems
RW	14	Craig Dowsett
FB	15	Alan Williams
Replacements:
HK	16	Vincent Tauzia	(substituted on) 53'
PR	17	Julien Massimi	(substituted on) 53'
LK	18	Bertrand Billi	(substituted on) 71'
FL	19	Thomas de Molder	(substituted on) 40'
FL	20	William van Bost	(substituted on) 51'
SH	21	Tom Cocqu	(substituted on) 74'
CE	22	Louis de Moffarts	(substituted on) 46'
PR	23	Bruno Vliegen	(substituted on) 66'
Coach:
Guillaume Ajac

Touch judges:
Ian Kenny (Scotland)
Graeme Ormiston (Scotland)

1 February 2020
18:00 GET (UTC+04)

(1 TBP) Georgia	41–13	Romania
Try: Abzhandadze 6' m Modebadze 45' m Gigashvili 58' c Kacharava (2) 64' c, 74' c Chkoidze 78' c Con: Abzhandadze (4/6); Pen: Abzhandadze (1/1)	RE Report; WR Report	Try: Vlaicu 49' c Con: Vlaicu (1/1); Pen: Vlaicu (2/3)

Boris Paichadze Dinamo Arena, Tbilisi
Attendance: 20,000
Referee: Tom Foley (England)

Team details

LP	1	Mikheil Nariashvili (c)	(substituted off) 60'
HK	2	Shalva Mamukashvili	(substituted off) 76'
TP	3	Beka Gigashvili	(substituted off) 72'
LL	4	Nodar Tcheishvili
RL	5	Konstantin Mikautadze	(substituted off) 59'
BF	6	Otar Giorgadze
OF	7	Giorgi Tsutskiridze	(substituted off) 67'
N8	8	Beka Gorgadze
SH	9	Vasil Lobzhanidze	(substituted off) 65'
FH	10	Tedo Abzhandadze
LW	11	Alexander Todua
IC	12	Giorgi Kveseladze	(substituted off) 17'
OC	13	Davit Kacharava
RW	14	Mirian Modebadze
FB	15	Lasha Khmaladze	(substituted off) 76'
Replacements:
HK	16	Giorgi Chkoidze	(substituted on) 76'
PR	17	Guram Gogichashvili	(substituted on) 60'
PR	18	Giorgi Melikidze	(substituted on) 72'
LK	19	Shalva Sutiashvili	(substituted on) 59'
FL	20	Mikheil Gachechiladze	(substituted on) 67'
SH	21	Gela Aprasidze	(substituted on) 65'
FH	22	Lasha Malaghuradze	(substituted on) 17'
FB	23	Soso Matiashvili	(substituted on) 76'
Coach:
Levan Maisashvili

LP	1	Constantin Pristăviță		(substituted off) 60'
HK	2	Eugen Căpățână		(substituted off) 60'
TP	3	Alexandru Țăruș
LL	4	Ionuț Mureșan
RL	5	Johannes van Heerden		(substituted off) 65'
BF	6	Dorin Lazăr		(substituted off) 45'
OF	7	Dragoș Ser
N8	8	Cristi Chirică
SH	9	Florin Surugiu	(c)
FH	10	Daniel Plai		(substituted off) 70'
LW	11	Ionuț Dumitru
IC	12	Florin Vlaicu
OC	13	Cătălin Fercu
RW	14	Marius Simionescu		(substituted off) 70'
FB	15	Ionel Melinte
Replacements:
HK	16	Ovidiu Cojocaru		(substituted on) 60'
PR	17	Iulian Hartig		(substituted on) 60'
LK	18	Adrian Moțoc		(substituted on) 65'
FL	19	Adrian Ion		(substituted on) 45'
FH	20	Tudor Boldor		(substituted on) 70'
SH	21	Tudorel Bratu
WG	22	Robert Neagu		(substituted on) 70'
Coach:
Andy Robinson

Touch judges:
J. P. Doyle (England)
Paul Dix (England)

=== Week 2 ===
8 February 2020
15:00 CET (UTC+01)

(1 TBP) Belgium	38–12	Russia
Try: Dienst 36' c Jadot 45' c Berger 50' c Deccuber 55' c Verschelden 69' c Con: Williams (5/5); Pen: Williams (1/1) 28'	RE Report; WR Report	Try: Sozonov 19' m Elgin 25' c Con: Gaisin (1/2)

Stade Communal Fallon, Brussels
Attendance: 2,500
Referee: Shota Tevzadze (Georgia)

Team details

LP	1	Alexis Cuffolo		(substituted off) 46'
HK	2	Thomas Dienst		(substituted off) 59'
TP	3	Maxime Jadot		(substituted off) 67'	(substituted on) 74'
LL	4	Tom Herenger		(substituted off) 67'
RL	5	Gilian Benoy		(substituted off) 55'
BF	6	Lucas de Connick
OF	7	Jean Maurice Deccuber		(substituted off) 71'
N8	8	Thomas de Molder
SH	9	Julien Berger (c)		(substituted off) 59'
FH	10	Antoine Vassart
LW	11	Gaspard Lalli		(substituted off) 74'
IC	12	Guillaume Piron		(substituted off) 61'
OC	13	Craig Dowsett
RW	14	Thomas Wallraf
FB	15	Alan Williams		(substituted on) 67'
Replacements:
HK	16	Vincent Tauzia		(substituted on) 59'
PR	17	Bastien Gallaire		(substituted on) 46'
LK	18	Mathieu Verschelden		(substituted on) 55'
LK	19	Bertrand Billi		(substituted on) 67'
SH	20	Tom Cocqu		(substituted on) 59'
CE	21	Louis de Moffarts		(substituted on) 61'
WG	22	Cédric Wieme		(substituted on) 67'
PR	23	Julien Massimi	(yellow card) 63' to 74'	(substituted on) 63'	(substituted off) 74'
Coach:
Guillaume Ajac

LP	1	Valery Morozov	(substituted off) 55'
HK	2	Evgeny Matveev	(substituted off) 60'
TP	3	Vladimir Podrezov	(substituted off) 60'
LL	4	Yegor Zykov
RL	5	Alexsandr Il`in	(substituted off) 8'
BF	6	Vitaly Zhivatov
OF	7	Anton Sychev	(substituted off) 71'
N8	8	Victor Gresev
SH	9	Aleksey Shcherban	(substituted off) 38'
FH	10	Yuri Kushnarev	(substituted off) 13'
LW	11	Vladislav Sozonov	(substituted off) 71'
IC	12	Kirill Golosnitsky
OC	13	German Davydov
RW	14	Vasily Artemyev (c)
FB	15	Ramil Gaisin
Replacements:
HK	16	Sergey Chernyshev	(substituted on) 60'
LK	17	Evgeny Mishechkin	(substituted on) 55'
PR	18	Azamat Bitiev	(substituted on) 60'
LK	19	Evgeny Elgin	(substituted on) 8'
FL	20	Eme Peki	(substituted on) 71'
SH	21	Stepan Khokhlov	(substituted on) 38'
WG	22	Khetag Dzobelov	(substituted on) 71'
CE	23	Dmitry Gerasimov	(substituted on) 13'
Coach:
Lyn Jones

Touch judges:
Tornike Gvirjishvili (Georgia)
Shota Tsagareishvili (Georgia)

8 February 2020
15:00 WET (UTC+00)

Portugal	22–11	Romania
Try: Antunes (2) 11' m, 29' m Tadjer 51' m Con: Antunes (2/3); Pen: Antunes (1/1)	RE Report; WR Report	Try: Simionescu 64' m Pen: Vlaicu (2/3)

Complexo Desportivo da Caldas da Rainha, Caldas da Rainha
Attendance: 1,500
Referee: Ludovic Cayre (France)

Team details

LP	1	Francisco Fernandes		(substituted off) 58'
HK	2	Mike Tadjer		(substituted off) 67'
TP	3	Ivo Morais		(substituted off) 44'
LL	4	Jean Sousa
RL	5	José Rebelo de Andrade		(substituted off) 60'
BF	6	João Granate		(substituted off) 42'	(substituted on) 43'
OF	7	David Wallis
N8	8	Manuel Picão		(substituted off) 40'
SH	9	Duarte Azevedo	(yellow card) 56' to 66'	(substituted off) 66'
FH	10	João Lima
LW	11	Dany Antunes		(substituted off) 60'
IC	12	Tomás Appleton (c)
OC	13	António Vidinha		(substituted off) 61'
RW	14	Rodrigo Marta
FB	15	Manuel Cardoso Pinto		(substituted off) 74'
Replacements:
HK	16	Lionel Campergue		(substituted on) 67'
PR	17	David Costa		(substituted on) 58'
LK	18	José Madeira		(substituted on) 42'	(substituted off) 43'	(substituted off) 60'
FL	19	Thibault de Freitas		(substituted on) 40'
FB	20	João Freudenthal		(substituted on) 74'
FH	21	Pedro Lucas		(substituted on) 66'
CE	22	José Lima		(substituted on) 61'
PR	23	Diogo Hasse Ferreira		(substituted on) 44'
Coach:
Patrice Lagisquet

LP	1	Ionel Badiu		(substituted off) 58'
HK	2	Ovidiu Cojocaru		(substituted off) 56'
TP	3	Alexandru Țăruș		(substituted off) 40'
LL	4	Ionuț Mureșan		(substituted off) 52'
RL	5	Adrian Moțoc
BF	6	Mihai Macovei (c)
OF	7	Dragoș Ser	(yellow card) 51' to 61'
N8	8	Kamil Sobota		(substituted off) 62'
SH	9	Florin Surugiu		(substituted off) 71'
FH	10	Tudor Boldor
LW	11	Ionuț Dumitru		(substituted off) 60'
IC	12	Florin Vlaicu
OC	13	Taylor Gontineac		(substituted off) 40'
RW	14	Marius Simionescu
FB	15	Ionel Melinte
Replacements:
HK	16	Eugen Căpățână		(substituted on) 56'
PR	17	Constantin Pristăviță		(substituted on) 58'
LK	18	Johannes van Heerden		(substituted on) 52'
FL	19	Adrian Ion		(substituted on) 62'
SH	20	Tudorel Bratu		(substituted on) 71'
CE	21	Vlăduț Popa		(substituted on) 40'
WG	22	Nicolas Onuțu		(substituted on) 60'
PR	23	Costel Burțilă		(substituted on) 40'
Coach:
Andy Robinson (England)

Touch judges:
Laurent Cardona (France)
Thierry Mallet (France)

9 February 2020
12:45 CET (UTC+01)

Spain	10–23	Georgia
Try: Pinto Ferrer 8' m Del Hoyo Portoles 78' m	RE Report; WR Report	Try: Mamukashvili 3' m Tabutsadze 20' c Mamukashvili 37' m Con: Abzhandadze (1/3); Pen: Abzhandadze (2/2)

Estadio Nacional Complutense, Madrid
Attendance: 8,000
Referee: Craig Evans (Wales)

Team details

LP	1	Fernando Martín López (c)	(substituted off) 19'
HK	2	Marco Pinto Ferrer	(substituted off) 58'
TP	3	Alberto Alonso Blanco	(substituted off) 46'
LL	4	Josh Peters	(substituted off) 61'
RL	5	Lucas Guillaume	10' to 18'
BF	6	Fréderic Quercy
OF	7	Gautier Gibouin
N8	8	Lionel Tauli	(substituted off) 46'
SH	9	Guillaume Rouet	(substituted off) 68'
FH	10	Brad Linklater
LW	11	J. W. Bell
IC	12	Andrea Rabago
OC	13	Richard Stewart	(substituted off) 40'
RW	14	Jordi Jorba	(substituted off) 4'
FB	15	Charly Malie
Replacements:
PR	16	Thierry Futeu	(substituted on) 19'
HK	17	Vicente del Hoyo Portoles	(substituted on) 58'
PR	18	Jon Zabala	(substituted on) 46'
FL	19	Victor Sánchez Borrego	(substituted on) 10'	(substituted off) 18'	(substituted on) 61'
N8	20	Nathan Paila	(substituted on) 46'
SH	21	Tomás Munilla	(substituted on) 68'
CE	22	Pierre Nueno	(substituted on) 40'
WG	23	Martín Alonso	(substituted on) 4'
Coach:
Santiago Santos

LP	1	Mikheil Nariashvili (c) (substituted off) 52'
HK	2	Shalva Mamukashvili (substituted off) 67'
TP	3	Levan Chilachava (substituted off) 50'
LL	4	Shalva Sutiashvili (substituted off) 69'
RL	5	Nodar Tcheishvili (substituted off) 64'
BF	6	Beka Saghinadze
OF	7	Giorgi Tsutskiridze
N8	8	Beka Gorgadze
SH	9	Vasil Lobzhanidze (substituted off) 64'
FH	10	Tedo Abzhandadze (substituted off) 64'
LW	11	Aka Tabutsadze
IC	12	Tamaz Mchedlidze (substituted off) 75'
OC	13	Davit Kacharava
RW	14	Alexander Todua
FB	15	Soso Matiashvili (substituted off) 76'
Replacements:
HK	16	Giorgi Chkoidze (substituted on) 67'
PR	17	Guram Gogichashvili (substituted on) 50'
PR	18	Beka Gigashvili (substituted on) 52'
LK	19	Davit Gigauri (substituted on) 64'
FL	20	Mikheil Gachechiladze (substituted on) 69'
SH	21	Gela Aprasidze (substituted on) 64'
FH	22	Lasha Malaghuradze (substituted on) 75'
FB	23	Lasha Khmaladze (substituted on) 64'
Coach:
Levan Maisashvili

Touch judges:
Aled Evans (Wales)
Mike English (Wales)

=== Week 3 ===
22 February 2020
15:00 EET (UTC+02)

Romania	24−7	Spain
	RE Report; WR Report

Stadionul Municipal, Botoșani
Attendance: 1,500
Referee: Nika Amashukeli (Georgia)

Team details

LP	1
HK	2
TP	3
LL	4
RL	5
BF	6
OF	7
N8	8
SH	9
FH	10
LW	11
IC	12
OC	13
RW	14
FB	15
Replacements:
HK	16
PR	17
PR	18
LK	19
SH	20
FH	21
CE	22
WG	23
Coach:

LP	1
HK	2
TP	3
LL	4
RL	5
BF	6
OF	7
N8	8
SH	9
FH	10
LW	11
IC	12
OC	13
RW	14
FB	15
Replacements:
HK	16
PR	17
PR	18
LK	19
SH	20
FH	21
CE	22
WG	23
Coach:

Touch judges:
Tornike Gvirjishvili (Georgia)
Shota Tsagareishvili (Georgia)

22 February 2020
15:00 GET (UTC+04)

(1 TBP) Georgia	78−6	Belgium
Try: Tabutsadze 7' m, 52' m, 77' m, 80' m Karkadze 14' m Matiashvili 17' m Dzneladze 26' m, 69' m Penalty Try 39' m Begadze 43' m Gorgadze 56' m Tkhilaishvili 63' m Con: Abzhandadze (9/11)	RE Report; WR Report	Pen: Vassart 20' m, 39' m

Aia Arena, Kutaisi
Attendance: 5,000
Referee: Cristian Șerban (Romania)

Team details

LP	1
HK	2
TP	3
LL	4
RL	5
BF	6
OF	7
N8	8
SH	9
FH	10
LW	11
IC	12
OC	13
RW	14
FB	15
Replacements:
HK	16
PR	17
PR	18
LK	19
SH	20
FH	21
CE	22
WG	23
Coach:

LP	1
HK	2
TP	3
LL	4
RL	5
BF	6
OF	7
N8	8
SH	9
FH	10
LW	11
IC	12
OC	13
RW	14
FB	15
Replacements:
HK	16
PR	17
PR	18
LK	19
SH	20
FH	21
CE	22
WG	23
Coach:

Touch judges:
Radu Petrescu (Romania)
Mihai Văcaru (Romania)

22 February 2020
16:00 KALT (UTC+02)

Russia	19−18	Portugal (1 LBP)
	RE Report; WR Report

Kaliningrad Stadium, Kaliningrad
Attendance: 12,000
Referee: Inigo Atorrasagasti (Spain)

Team details

LP	1
HK	2
TP	3
LL	4
RL	5
BF	6
OF	7
N8	8
SH	9
FH	10
LW	11
IC	12
OC	13
RW	14
FB	15
Replacements:
HK	16
PR	17
PR	18
LK	19
SH	20
FH	21
CE	22
WG	23
Coach:

LP	1
HK	2
TP	3
LL	4
RL	5
BF	6
OF	7
N8	8
SH	9
FH	10
LW	11
IC	12
OC	13
RW	14
FB	15
Replacements:
HK	16
PR	17
PR	18
LK	19
SH	20
FH	21
CE	22
WG	23
Coach:

Touch judges:
Iñaki Muñoz Martin (Spain)
Jon Ibisate Alday (Spain)

=== Week 4 ===
7 March 2020
15:00 CET (UTC+01)

(1 LBP) Belgium	23–30	Spain
	RE Report; WR Report

Stade Communal Fallon, Brussels
Attendance: 3,000
Referee: Sean Gallagher (Ireland)

Team details

LP	1
HK	2
TP	3
LL	4
RL	5
BF	6
OF	7
N8	8
SH	9
FH	10
LW	11
IC	12
OC	13
RW	14
FB	15
Replacements:
HK	16
PR	17
PR	18
LK	19
SH	20
FH	21
CE	22
WG	23
Coach:

LP	1
HK	2
TP	3
LL	4
RL	5
BF	6
OF	7
N8	8
SH	9
FH	10
LW	11
IC	12
OC	13
RW	14
FB	15
Replacements:
HK	16
PR	17
PR	18
LK	19
SH	20
FH	21
CE	22
WG	23
Coach:

Touch judges:
Chris Busby (Ireland)
John Carvill (Ireland)

7 March 2020
15:00 MSK (UTC+03)

Russia	32–25	Romania (1 LBP)
	RE Report; WR Report

Kuban Stadium, Krasnodar
Attendance: 3,100
Referee: Dan Jones (Wales)

Team details

LP	1
HK	2
TP	3
LL	4
RL	5
BF	6
OF	7
N8	8
SH	9
FH	10
LW	11
IC	12
OC	13
RW	14
FB	15
Replacements:
HK	16
PR	17
PR	18
LK	19
SH	20
FH	21
CE	22
WG	23
Coach:

LP	1
HK	2
TP	3
LL	4
RL	5
BF	6
OF	7
N8	8
SH	9
FH	10
LW	11
IC	12
OC	13
RW	14
FB	15
Replacements:
HK	16
PR	17
PR	18
LK	19
SH	20
FH	21
CE	22
WG	23
Coach:

Touch judges:
Mike English (Wales)
Tom Spurrier (Wales)

7 March 2020
16:00 CET (UTC+01)

Portugal	24–39	Georgia (1 TBP)
Try: Costa Cardoso Pinto 6'; Antunes 22'; Belo 41'; Con: Antunes 7', 23', 42'; Pen: Antunes 64'	RE Report; WR Report	Try: Mamukashvili 3'; Gorgadze 9'; Kacharava 34'; Saginadze 58'; Tapladze 71'; Matiashvili 75'; Con: Matiashvili 4'

Stade Jean-Bouin, Paris
Attendance: 2,000
Referee: Ben Blain (Scotland)

Team details

LP	1
HK	2
TP	3
LL	4
RL	5
BF	6
OF	7
N8	8
SH	9
FH	10
LW	11
IC	12
OC	13
RW	14
FB	15
Replacements:
HK	16
PR	17
PR	18
LK	19
SH	20
FH	21
CE	22
WG	23
Coach:

LP	1
HK	2
TP	3
LL	4
RL	5
BF	6
OF	7
N8	8
SH	9
FH	10
LW	11
IC	12
OC	13
RW	14
FB	15
Replacements:
HK	16
PR	17
PR	18
LK	19
SH	20
FH	21
CE	22
WG	23
Coach:

Touch judges:
Ross Mabon (Scotland)
Neil Muir (Scotland)

=== Week 5 ===
N/A
N/A

(1 TBP) Romania	28–0	Belgium
	WR Report

Team details

LP	1
HK	2
TP	3
LL	4
RL	5
BF	6
OF	7
N8	8
SH	9
FH	10
LW	11
IC	12
OC	13
RW	14
FB	15
Replacements:
HK	16
PR	17
PR	18
LK	19
SH	20
FH	21
CE	22
WG	23
Coach:

LP	1
HK	2
TP	3
LL	4
RL	5
BF	6
OF	7
N8	8
SH	9
FH	10
LW	11
IC	12
OC	13
RW	14
FB	15
Replacements:
HK	16
PR	17
PR	18
LK	19
SH	20
FH	21
CE	22
WG	23
Coach:

Touch judges:

7 February 2021
15:00 GET (UTC+04)

Georgia	16–7	Russia
Try: Vasil Lobzhanidze 45'; Con: Tedo Abzhandadze 46'; Pen: Tedo Abzhandadze 53', 66', 75'	RE report WR Report	Try: Bogdan Fedotko 60'; Con: Ramil Gaisin 61'

Mikheil Meskhi Stadium, Tbilisi
Attendance: 0
Referee: Paulo Duarte (Portugal)

Team details

LP	1	Zurabi Zhvania
HK	2	Shalva Mamukashvili
TP	3	Beka Gigashvili
LL	4	Lasha Jaiani
RL	5	Giorgi Javakhia
BF	6	Mikheil Gachechiladze
OF	7	Beka Saghinadze
N8	8	Tornike Jalaghonia
SH	9	Vasil Lobzhanidze
FH	10	Tedo Abzhandadze
LW	11	Mirian Modebadze
IC	12	Tamaz Mchedlidze
OC	13	Merab Sharikadze (c)
RW	14	Aka Tabutsadze
FB	15	Davit Niniashvili
Replacements:
HK	16	Giorgi Chkoidze
PR	17	Giorgi Nutsubidze
PR	18	Giorgi Melikidze
LK	19	Davit Gigauri
SH	20	Giorgi Tkhilaishvili
FH	21	Gela Aprasidze
CE	22	Lasha Khmaladze
WG	23	Demur Tapladze
Coach: Levan Maisashvili

LP	1
HK	2
TP	3
LL	4
RL	5
BF	6
OF	7
N8	8
SH	9
FH	10
LW	11
IC	12
OC	13
RW	14
FB	15
Replacements:
HK	16
PR	17
PR	18
LK	19
SH	20
FH	21
CE	22
WG	23
Coach:

Touch judges:
Eugeniu Procopi (Moldova)
Shota Tevzadze (Georgia)

7 February 2021
12:45 CET (UTC+01)

Spain	25–11	Portugal
	RE report WR Report

Estadio Nacional Complutense, Madrid
Attendance: 0
Referee: Chris Busby (Ireland)

Team details

LP	1	Fernando Martín López (c)	(substituted off) 49'
HK	2	Vicente del Hoyo	(substituted off) 55'
TP	3	Jon Zabala	(substituted off) 68'
LL	4	Josh Peters	(substituted off) 49'
RL	5	Víctor Sánchez
BF	6	Matthew Robert Foulds	(substituted off) 61'
OF	7	Gautier Gibouin
N8	8	Fred Quercy
SH	9	Tomás Munilla	(substituted off) 66'
FH	10	Bautista Eduardo Guemes
LW	11	Gautier Minguillón
IC	12	Alvar Gimeno	(substituted off) 21'
OC	13	Richard Stewart
RW	14	Julen Goia
FB	15	John Wessell Bell	(substituted off) 71'
Replacements:
LP	16	Bastien Didieu	(substituted on) 49'
HK	17	Stephen John Barnes	(substituted on) 55'
TP	18	Alberto Blanco	(substituted on) 68'
LK	19	Manuel Mora	(substituted on) 49'
FK	20	Facundo Domínguez	(substituted on) 61'
SH	21	Facundo Munilla	(substituted on) 66'
CE	22	Manuel Ordás	(substituted on) 21'
WG	23	Guillermo Domínguez	(substituted on) 71'
Coach:
Santiago Santos

LP	1	Francisco Fernandes	(substituted off) 55'
HK	2	Loic Bournonville	(substituted off) 59'
TP	3	Anthony Alves	(substituted off) 55'
LL	4	José Madeira
RL	5	Eric Madeira	(substituted off) 59'
BF	6	Federico Couto
OF	7	Valentín Ambrosio
N8	8	Thibaut de Freitas
SH	9	João Belo	(substituted off) 68'
FH	10	João Lima
LW	11	António Monteiro	(substituted off) 55'
IC	12	Tomás Appleton (c)
OC	13	José Vareta
RW	14	Rodrigo Marta
FB	15	Manuel Cardoso Pinto	(substituted off) 38'
Replacements:
TP	16	Diogo Ferreira (rugby union)	(substituted on) 55'
HK	17	Rodrigo Bento	(substituted on) 59'
LP	18	David Costa	(substituted on) 55'
LK	19	Duarte Torgal	(substituted on) 59'
FK	20	Manuel Eusebio
SH	21	Pedro Lucas	(substituted on) 68'
WG	22	Rafaelle Storti	(substituted on) 55'
FB	23	Dany Antunes	(substituted on) 38'
Coach:
Patrice Lagisquet

Touch judges:
Yann Benoit (Switzerland)
Ethan Glass (Switzerland)

== Relegation/promotion play-off ==
29 May 2021
14:00 CEST (UTC+02)

Belgium	21–23	Netherlands
	RE report WR Report

ASUB Rugby Field, Waterloo
Attendance: 0
Referee: Andrea Piardi (Italy)

== International broadcasters ==
Country	Broadcaster	Summary
Belgium
Belgium	Auvio; Eén	Selected games exclusively live on RTBF Sport and selected games are also free on Eén under the name Sporza
Georgia	Rugby TV; Imedi TV	All games exclusively live and free on Rugby TV and Imedi TV
Portugal	Sport TV; Rugby TV Portugal	Selected games live on Sport TV 5 and free on Rugby TV Portugal
Romania	TVR	All games exclusively live and free on TVR 1
Russia	Match TV; VKontakte	All games exclusively broadcast on Match TV and streamed for free on VKontakte
Spain	TVE	All games exclusively live and free on TVE
Europe	Rugby Europe TV	All games exclusively streamed and free on Rugby Europe TV

== See also ==
- Rugby Europe International Championships
- 2019–20 Rugby Europe International Championships
- Antim Cup
- Six Nations Championship
- 2020 Rugby Europe Championship squads
