= 2019 Rugby Europe Championship =

- Date: February 2019 – March 2019
- Countries: Belgium; Georgia; Germany; Romania; Russia; Spain

Tournament statistics
- Champions: Georgia (11th title)
- Grand Slam: Georgia (8th)
- Antim Cup: Georgia (12th title)
- Matches played: 15
- Attendance: 57,900 (3,860 per match)
- Tries scored: 93 (6.2 per match)
- Top point scorer(s): (Romania) Florin Vlaicu (39)
- Top try scorer(s): (Georgia (country)) Mirian Modebadze (5)
- Official website: Rugby Europe International Championship

The 2019 Rugby Europe Championship is the premier rugby union competition outside of the Six Nations Championship in Europe. This is the third season under its new format, that sees Georgia, Germany, Russia, Spain, Belgium and Romania compete for the title. After the eligibility controversy of the 2018 Championship, Romania had to face Portugal for the promotion- / relegation- play-off and defeated them, hence joining the competition as the sixth contender.

== Table ==
Champions
Advances to promotion/relegation play-off

Place	Nation	Games				Points			Tries			TBP	LBP	GS	Table points
Place	Nation	Played	Won	Drawn	Lost	For	Against	Diff	For	Against	Diff	TBP	LBP	GS	Table points
1	Georgia	5	5	0	0	162	34	+128	25	2	+23	3	0	1	24
2	Spain	5	4	0	1	127	75	+52	18	9	+9	2	0	0	18
3	Romania	5	3	0	2	130	86	+44	14	12	+2	2	1	0	15
4	Russia	5	2	0	3	130	85	+45	20	8	+12	1	2	0	11
5	Belgium	5	1	0	4	68	222	-154	8	33	-25	0	0	0	4
6	Germany	5	0	0	5	63	178	–115	7	28	–21	0	1	0	1
Points were awarded to the teams as follows: Win – 4 points | Draw – 2 points | At least 3 or more tries than opponent – 1 point | Loss within 7 points – 1 point | Loss greater than 7 points – 0 points | Completing a Grand Slam – 1 point

== Fixtures ==
=== Week 1 ===
9 February 2019
14:00 EET (UTC+02)

Romania	9–18	Georgia
Pen: Vlaicu (3) 8', 24', 72'	RE Report; WR Report	Try: Penalty try 45'; Gorgadze 64' m Pen: Abzhandadze (2) 36', 80+2'

Cluj Arena, Cluj
Attendance: 1,500
Referee: Sean Gallagher (Ireland)

LP	1	Mihai Lazăr		(substituted off) 51'
HK	2	Otar Turashvili		(substituted off) 41'
TP	3	Andrei Ursache		(substituted off) 51'	(substituted in) 60'
LL	4	Johan van Heerden		(substituted off) 60'
RL	5	Marius Antonescu
BF	6	Mihai Macovei (c)
OF	7	Adrian Ion
N8	8	Andrei Gorcioaia		(substituted off) 62'
SH	9	Valentin Calafeteanu	(yellow card) 45' to 55'	(substituted off) 58'
FH	10	Daniel Plai		(substituted off) 75'
LW	11	Nicolas Onuțu		(substituted off) 60'
IC	12	Florin Vlaicu
OC	13	Cătălin Fercu
RW	14	Vlad Zaharia
FB	15	Ionel Melinte
Replacements:
PR	16	Ionel Badiu		(substituted in) 51'	(substituted off) 60'
HK	17	Eugen Căpățână		(substituted in) 41'
PR	18	Alex Gordaș		(substituted in) 51'
LK	19	Dorin Lazăr		(substituted in) 60'
FL	20	Viorel Lucaci		(substituted in) 62'
SH	21	Florin Surugiu		(substituted in) 58'
CE	22	Alexandru Bucur		(substituted in) 75'
CE	23	Vlăduț Popa		(substituted in) 60'
Coach:
Marius Țincu

LP	1	Guram Gogichashvili	(substituted off) 73'
HK	2	Shalva Mamukashvili	(substituted off) 73'
TP	3	Beka Gigashvili	(substituted off) 59'
LL	4	Davit Gigauri	(substituted off) 53'
RL	5	Giorgi Nemsadze
BF	6	Beka Saghinadze	(substituted off) 59'
OF	7	Giorgi Tsutskiridze
N8	8	Beka Gorgadze
SH	9	Vasil Lobzhanidze	(substituted off) 75'
FH	10	Tedo Abzhandadze
LW	11	Zurab Dzneladze
IC	12	Giorgi Kveseladze
OC	13	Merab Sharikadze (c)
RW	14	Alexander Todua	(substituted off) 73'
FB	15	Lasha Khmaladze
Replacements:
HK	16	Vano Karkadze	(substituted in) 73'
PR	17	Tornike Mataradze	(substituted in) 73'
PR	18	Levan Chilachava	(substituted in) 59'
LK	19	Nodar Tcheishvili	(substituted in) 53'
FL	20	Giorgi Tkhilaishvili	(substituted in) 59'
SH	21	Gela Aprasidze	(substituted in) 75'
WG	22	Mirian Modebadze	(substituted in) 73'
WG	23	Giorgi Aptsiauri
Coach:
Milton Haig

Touch judges:
George Clancy (Ireland)
Mark Patton (Ireland)

9 February 2019
15:00 CET (UTC+01)

Belgium	29–22	Germany (1 LBP)
Try: Penalty try (2) 11', 55'; Jadot 40+3' m Dienst 72' m Benoy 80+2' m	RE Report; WR Report	Try: Füchsel 6' c Otto (2) 59' c, 77' m Con: Parkinson (2/3) 7', 60'; Pen: Parkinson 62'

King Baudouin Stadium – Annex 2, Brussels
Attendance: 4,000
Referee: Shota Tevzadze (Georgia)

LP	1	Jean-Baptiste Le Clercq		(substituted off) 75'
HK	2	Thomas Dienst		(substituted off) 73'
TP	3	Maxime Jadot		(substituted off) 60'
LL	4	Sven d'Hooghe
RL	5	Tom Herenger		(substituted off) 65'
BF	6	Gillian Benoy
OF	7	Mathieu Verschelden		(substituted off) 78'
N8	8	William Van Bost
SH	9	Julien Berger		(substituted off) 73'
FH	10	Vincent Hart
LW	11	Thomas Wallraf
IC	12	Jens Torfs (c)
OC	13	Craig Dowsett
RW	14	Ervin Muric
FB	15	Charles Reynaert		(substituted off) 40'
Replacements:
PR	16	Alexis Cuffolo		(substituted in) 73'
PR	17	Lucas Sotteau	(yellow card) 76' to 80+3'	(substituted in) 60'
LK	18	Bertrand Billi		(substituted in) 65'
FL	19	Amin Hamzaoui		(substituted in) 78'
CE	20	Louis Debatty		(substituted in) 40'
FH	21	Emiel Vermote
SH	22	Isaac Montoisy		(substituted in) 73'
PR	23	Romain Pinte		(substituted in) 75'
Coach:
Guillaume Ajac

LP	1	Tobias Williams
HK	2	Dasch Barber		(substituted off) 40'
TP	3	Sammy Füchsel		(substituted off) 73'
LL	4	Eric Marks
RL	5	Jörn Schröder		(substituted off) 69'
BF	6	Marcel Henn	(yellow card) 70' to 80'
OF	7	Jaco Otto (c)
N8	8	Sebastian Ferreira
SH	9	Tim Menzel		(substituted off) 73'
FH	10	Raynor Parkinson
LW	11	Vito Lammers		(substituted off) 15'
IC	12	Hagen Schulte
OC	13	Wynston Cameron-Dow		(substituted off) 76'
RW	14	Nikolai Klewinghaus
FB	15	Harris Aounallah
Replacements:
HK	16	Kurt Haupt		(substituted in) 40'
PR	17	Felix Martel
PR	18	Antony Dickinson		(substituted in) 73'
LK	19	Hassan Rayan		(substituted in) 69'
FL	20	Elias Haase
SH	21	Morne Laubscher		(substituted in) 73'
CE	22	Eden Syme		(substituted in) 76'
CE	23	Felix Lammers		(substituted in) 15'
Coach:
Mike Ford

Touch judges:
Sulkhan Chikhladze (Georgia)
Shota Tsagareishvili (Georgia)

10 February 2019
12:45 CET (UTC+01)

Spain	16–14	Russia (1 LBP)
Try: Auzqui 18' c Con: Rabago (1/1) 19'; Pen: Rabago (3) 52', 62', 67'	RE Report; WR Report	Try: Ostroushko (2) 22' c, 36' c Con: Kushnarev (2/2) 23', 37'

Estadio Nacional Complutense, Madrid
Attendance: 5,800
Referee: Joy Neville (Ireland)

LP	1	Fernando López Pérez (c)	(substituted off) 69'
HK	2	Beñat Auzqui	(substituted off) 50'
TP	3	Xerom Civil Bonaventure	(substituted off) 56'
LL	4	Mickael De Marco	(substituted off) 74'
RL	5	Joshua Peters
BF	6	Lucas Guillaume
OF	7	Asier Ussáraga Latierro
N8	8	Ilaitia Gavidi	(substituted off) 44'
SH	9	Lucas Rubio
FH	10	Andrew Norton	(substituted off) 71'
LW	11	Federico Casteglioni	(substituted off) 77'
IC	12	Richard Stewart	(substituted off) 71'
OC	13	Andrea Rabago
RW	14	Jordi Jorba Jorge
FB	15	Julen Goia Iriberri
Replacements:
PR	16	Francisco Blanco Alonso	(substituted in) 69'
HK	17	Quentin García	(substituted in) 50'
LK	18	Victor Sánchez Borrego	(substituted in) 74'
FL	19	Michael Hogg	(substituted in) 44'
SH	20	Facundo Munilla	(substituted in) 71'
CE	21	Gauthier Minguillon	(substituted in) 71'
FB	22	Guillermo Domínguez	(substituted in) 77'
PR	23	Jon Zabala	(substituted in) 56'
Coach:
Santiago Santos

LP	1	Valery Morozov		(substituted off) 62'
HK	2	Stanislav Selskii		(substituted off) 62'
TP	3	Vladimir Podrezov		(substituted off) 62'
LL	4	Bogdan Fedotko		(substituted off) 77'
RL	5	Andrei Ostrikov
BF	6	Vitaly Zhivatov		(substituted off) 62'
OF	7	Tagir Gadzhiev	(yellow card) 16' to 26'
N8	8	Nikita Vavilin
SH	9	Vasily Dorofeev		(substituted off) 68'
FH	10	Yuri Kushnarev		(substituted off) 77'
LW	11	Daniil Potikhanov
IC	12	Dmitri Gerasimov
OC	13	Vladimir Ostroushko
RW	14	Denis Simplikevich		(substituted off) 77'
FB	15	Vasily Artemyev (c)
Replacements:
HK	16	Evgeni Matveev		(substituted in) 62'
PR	17	Andrei Polivalov		(substituted in) 62'
PR	18	Innoentiy Zykov		(substituted in) 62'
N8	19	Alexander Ilin		(substituted in) 77'
LK	20	Anton Sychev		(substituted in) 62'
SH	21	Dmitrii Perov		(substituted in) 68'
FH	22	Sergei Ianiushkin		(substituted in) 77'
WG	23	German Davydov		(substituted in) 77'
Coach:
Lyn Jones

Touch judges:
Frank Murphy (Ireland)
Chris Busby (Ireland)

=== Week 2 ===
16 February 2019
15:00 MSK (UTC+03)

(1 TBP) Russia	64–7	Belgium
Try: Gerasimov (2) 13' c, 43' c Gadzhiev 16' c Polivalov 21' c Davydov (2) 25' c, 66' m Kononov 33' m Artemyev 49' m Ostroushko 52' c Vavilin 74' c Con: Kushnarev (6/8) 14', 17', 22', 26', 44', 52'; Ianiushkin (1/2) 75'	RE Report; WR Report	Try: Isaac Montoisy 40' c Con: De Moffarts (1/1) 40+1'

Slava Metreveli Central Stadium, Sochi
Attendance: 3,000
Referee: Cristian Serban (Romania)

LP	1	Andrei Polivalov		(substituted off) 58'
HK	2	Stanislav Selskii		(substituted off) 50'	(substituted in) 61'	(substituted off) 73'
TP	3	Vladimir Podrezov		(substituted off) 50'
LL	4	Bogdan Fedotko
RL	5	Andrei Garbuzov		(substituted off) 63'
BF	6	Anton Sychev
OF	7	Tagir Gadzhiev		(substituted off) 51'
N8	8	Nikita Vavilin
SH	9	Vasily Dorofeev		(substituted off) 58'
FH	10	Yuri Kushnarev		(substituted off) 54'
LW	11	Viktor Kononov			(substituted off) 61'	(substituted in) 73'
IC	12	Dmitri Gerasimov		(substituted off) 54'
OC	13	Vladimir Ostroushko	(yellow card) 79' to 80'
RW	14	German Davydov
FB	15	Vasily Artemyev (c)
Replacements:
HK	16	Evgeni Matveev	(yellow card) 60' to 72'	(substituted in) 50'
PR	17	Evgeny Mishechkin		(substituted in) 58'
PR	18	Azamat Bitiev		(substituted in) 50'
LK	19	Alexander Ilin		(substituted in) 63'
CE	20	Kirill Golosnitskii		(substituted in) 54'
SH	21	Dmitrii Perov		(substituted in) 58'
N8	22	Roman Khodin		(substituted in) 51'
FH	23	Sergei Ianiushkin		(substituted in) 54'
Coach:
Lyn Jones

LP	1	Lucas Sotteau	(yellow card) 10' to 23'			(substituted off) 50'
HK	2	Thomas Dienst (c)		(substituted off) 44'
TP	3	Romain Pinte		(substituted off) 66'
LL	4	Sven d'Hooghe		(substituted off) 54'
RL	5	Tuur Moelants
BF	6	Gillian Benoy
OF	7	Amin Hamzaoui		(substituted off) 10'	(substituted in) 23'	(substituted off) 40'
N8	8	Bertrand Billi
SH	9	Isaac Montoisy
FH	10	Vincent Hart		(substituted off) 44'
LW	11	Rayane Leduc
IC	12	Louis Debatty
OC	13	Louis De Moffarts
RW	14	Thomas Wallraf
FB	15	Emiel Vermote		(substituted off) 59'
Replacements:
PR	16	Alexis Cuffolo		(substituted in) 44'
HK	17	Martin Jessen		(substituted in) 66'
PR	18	Simon Vankeerberghen			(substituted in) 70'
LK	19	Brieuc Corradi		(substituted in) 54'	(substituted off) 70'
N8	20	Sacha Yoko		(substituted in) 59'
FL	21	Corentin Lecloux				(substituted in) 40'
SH	22	Tom Cocqu		(substituted in) 44'
PR	23	Bastien Gallaire		(substituted in) 10'	(substituted off) 23'	(substituted in) 50'
Coach:
Guillaume Ajac

Touch judges:
Alexandru Ionescu (Romania)
Madalin Garbau (Romania)

16 February 2019
14:00 EET (UTC+02)

(1 TBP) Romania	38–10	Germany
Try: Dumitru 7' c Melinte 15' m Zaharia 32' m Surugiu 55' c Popa 59' c Plai 79' c Con: Vlaicu (4/6) 8', 56', 60', 80'	RE Report; WR Report	Try: Nostadt 65' c Con: Klewinghaus (1/1) 66'; Pen: Klewinghaus 18'

Stadionul Municipal, Botoșani
Referee: Nika Amashukeli (Georgia)

LP	1	Constantin Pristăviță	(substituted off) 40'
HK	2	Eugen Căpățână	(substituted off) 49'
TP	3	Alexandru Țăruș	(substituted off) 49'
LL	4	Johan van Heerden
RL	5	Marius Antonescu
BF	6	Mihai Macovei (c)
OF	7	Adrian Ion	(substituted off) 54'
N8	8	Andrei Gorcioaia	(substituted off) 56'
SH	9	Florin Surugiu	(substituted off) 61'
FH	10	Daniel Plai
LW	11	Ionuț Dumitru
IC	12	Florin Vlaicu
OC	13	Vlăduț Popa	(substituted off) 61'
RW	14	Vladut Zaharia
FB	15	Ionel Melinte	(substituted off) 52'
Replacements:
HK	16	Ovidiu Cojocaru	(substituted in) 49'
PR	17	Alexandru Savin	(substituted in) 40'
PR	18	Alex Gordaș	(substituted in) 49'
LK	19	Dorin Lazăr	(substituted in) 54'
FL	20	Cristi Chirică	(substituted in) 56'
SH	21	Alexandru Tigla	(substituted in) 61'
CE	22	Alexandru Bucur	(substituted in) 61'
FB	23	Marius Simionescu	(substituted in) 52'
Coach:
Marius Țincu

LP	1	Tobias Williams
HK	2	Kurt Haupt	(yellow card) 54' to 64'	(substituted off) 64'
TP	3	Sammy Füchsel		(substituted off) 40'
LL	4	Jörn Schröder		(substituted off) 72'
RL	5	Eric Marks
BF	6	Emil Rupf
OF	7	Jaco Otto		(substituted off) 75'
N8	8	Sebastian Ferreira (c)
SH	9	Tim Menzel		(substituted off) 72'
FH	10	Hagen Schulte
LW	11	Felix Lammers		(substituted off) 50'	(substituted in) 58'	(substituted off) 64'
IC	12	Wynston Cameron-Dow
OC	13	Vito Lammers		(substituted off) 44'
RW	14	Nikolai Klewinghaus
FB	15	Harris Aounallah
Replacements:
HK	16	Dasch Barber		(substituted in) 64'
PR	17	Julius Nostadt		(substituted in) 50'
PR	18	Matthias Schösser	(yellow card) 48' to 58'	(substituted in) 40'	(substituted off) 58'
FL	19	Elias Haase		(substituted in) 75'
PR	20	Felix Martel		(substituted in) 72'
SH	21	Morne Laubscher		(substituted in) 72'
CE	22	Eden Syme		(substituted in) 44'
CE	23	Samuel Harris				(substituted in) 64'
Coach:
Mike Ford

Touch judges:
Tornike Gvirjishvili (Georgia)
Irakli Tchanukvadze (Georgia)

17 February 2019
18:00 GET (UTC+04)

Georgia	24–10	Spain
Try: Gigauri 14' c Chilachava 30' m Lobzhanidze 65' m Kerdikoshvili 70' c Con: Abzhandadze (2/4) 15', 71'	RE report WR report	Try: Barnes 23' m Goia 80' m

Avchala Stadium, Tbilisi
Attendance: 3,000
Referee: Christophe Ridley (England)

LP	1	Guram Gogichashvili	(substituted off) 48'
HK	2	Shalva Mamukashvili	(substituted off) 76'
TP	3	Levan Chilachava	(substituted off) 71'
LL	4	Davit Gigauri	(substituted off) 60'
RL	5	Giorgi Nemsadze (c)
BF	6	Giorgi Tkhilaishvili	(substituted off) 71'
OF	7	Giorgi Tsutskiridze
N8	8	Beka Gorgadze
SH	9	Vasil Lobzhanidze	(substituted off) 75'
FH	10	Tedo Abzhandadze	(substituted off) 75'
LW	11	Alexander Todua
IC	12	Giorgi Kveseladze
OC	13	Zurab Dzneladze
RW	14	Giorgi Aptsiauri
FB	15	Lasha Khmaladze	(substituted off) 76'
Replacements:
HK	16	Giorgi Chkoidze	(substituted in) 76'
PR	17	Beka Gigashvili	(substituted in) 48'
PR	18	Giorgi Melikidze	(substituted in) 71'
FL	19	Grigor Kerdikoshvili	(substituted in) 60'
FL	20	Giorgi Javakhia	(substituted in) 71'
SH	21	Giorgi Begadze	(substituted in) 75'
FH	22	Lasha Malaghuradze	(substituted in) 75'
WG	23	Mirian Modebadze	(substituted in) 76'
Coach:
Milton Haig

LP	1	Fernando López Pérez (c)		(substituted off) 69'
HK	2	Stephen Barnes	(yellow card) 52' to 62'	(substituted off) 64'
TP	3	Xerom Civil Bonaventure		(substituted off) 55'
LL	4	Manu Mora		(substituted off) 55'
RL	5	Mickael De Marco
BF	6	Lucas Guillaume
OF	7	Victor Sánchez Borrego
N8	8	Michael Hogg		(substituted off) 74'
SH	9	Lucas Rubio		(substituted off) 69'
FH	10	Alvar Gimeno		(substituted off) 74'
LW	11	Julen Goia Iriberri	(yellow card) 57' to 67'
IC	12	Richard Stewart
OC	13	Andrea Rabago
RW	14	Jordi Jorba Jorge		(substituted off) 74'
FB	15	Lucas Levy
Replacements:
PR	16	Joaquín Manuel Domínguez		(substituted in) 69'
HK	17	Vicente Del Hoyo		(substituted in) 64'
LK	18	Michael Walker-Fitton		(substituted in) 55'
N8	19	Oier Goia Iriberri		(substituted in) 74'
SH	20	Facundo Munilla		(substituted in) 69'
FH	21	Andrew Norton		(substituted in) 74'
WG	22	Federico Castiglioni		(substituted in) 74'
PR	23	Jon Zabala		(substituted in) 55'
Coach:
Santiago Santos

Touch judges:
Jack Makepeace (England)
Tim Wigglesworth (England)

=== Week 3 ===
2 March 2019
15:00 CET (UTC+01)

Germany	18–26	Russia
Try: Coetzee 60' m Lammers 72' c Con: Hilsenbeck (1/2) 72'; Pen: Hilsenbeck 20', 33'	RE Report; WR Report	Try: Davydov 8' m Gadzhiev 28' c Matveev 44' c Sychev 50' c Con: Kushnarev (3/4) 29', 45', 50'

Fritz-Grunebaum-Sportpark, Heidelberg
Attendance: 2,100
Referee: Ludovic Cayre (France)

LP	1	Tobias Williams	(substituted off) 51'
HK	2	Kurt Haupt	(substituted off) 59'
TP	3	Sammy Füchsel	(substituted off) 59'
LL	4	Jörn Schröder	(substituted off) 74'
RL	5	Eric Marks
BF	6	Marcel Henn	(substituted off) 70'
OF	7	Jaco Otto
N8	8	Sebastian Ferreira (c)
SH	9	Tim Menzel	(substituted off) 53'
FH	10	Christopher Hilsenbeck
LW	11	Felix Lammers	(substituted off) 76'
IC	12	Eden Syme
OC	13	Wynston Cameron-Dow
RW	14	Nikolai Klewinghaus
FB	15	Hagen Schulte	(substituted off) 49'
Replacements:
HK	16	Dasch Barber	(substituted in) 59'
PR	17	Julius Nostadt	(substituted in) 51'
PR	18	Antony Dickinson	(substituted in) 59'
FL	19	Emil Rupf	(substituted in) 70'
FL	20	Lee Murray	(substituted in) 74'
SH	21	Morne Laubscher	(substituted in) 53'
WG	22	Marcel Coetzee	(substituted in) 49'
CE	23	Samuel Harris	(substituted in) 76'
Coach:
Mike Ford

LP	1	Andrei Polivalov	(substituted off) 69'
HK	2	Evgeni Matveev	(substituted off) 56'
TP	3	Innoentiy Zykov	(substituted off) 56'
LL	4	Bogdan Fedotko
RL	5	Andrei Garbuzov	(substituted off) 56'
BF	6	Anton Sychev	(substituted off) 61'
OF	7	Tagir Gadzhiev
N8	8	Nikita Vavilin
SH	9	Vasily Dorofeev	(substituted off) 58'
FH	10	Yuri Kushnarev	(substituted off) 72'
LW	11	Mikhail Babaev
IC	12	Dmitri Gerasimov
OC	13	Vladimir Ostroushko
RW	14	German Davydov	(substituted off) 33'
FB	15	Vasily Artemyev (c)
Replacements:
HK	16	Stanislav Selskii	(substituted in) 56'
PR	17	Evgeny Mishechkin	(substituted in) 69'
PR	18	Vladimir Podrezov	(substituted in) 56'
LK	19	Alexander Ilin	(substituted in) 56'
CE	20	Kirill Golosnitskii	(substituted in) 33'
SH	21	Dmitrii Perov	(substituted in) 58'
FL	22	Vitaly Zhivatov	(substituted in) 61'
FH	23	Sergei Ianiushkin	(substituted in) 72'
Coach:
Lyn Jones

Touch judges:
Mathieu Noirot (France)
Nicolas Datas (France)

2 March 2019
16:00 CET (UTC+01)

Belgium	6–46	Georgia (1 TBP)
Pen: De Moffarts 36', 45'	RE Report; WR Report	Try: Gogichashvili 11' m Nemsadze 22' c Tsutskiridze (2) 26' m, 65' m Modebadze 33' m Dzneladze 62' c Aprasidze 73' m Tkhilaishvili 80' c Con: Matiashvili (1/4) 22'; Aprasidze (2/4) 62', 80+1'

King Baudouin Stadium – Annex 2, Brussels
Attendance: 2,000
Referee: Ben Blain (Scotland)

LP	1	Bastien Gallaire	(substituted off) 54'
HK	2	Thomas Dienst (c)	(substituted off) 60'
TP	3	Romain Pinte	(substituted off) 60'
LL	4	Bertrand Billi
RL	5	Maxime Ghion	(substituted off) 52'
BF	6	Gillian Benoy	(substituted off) 71'
OF	7	Romain Honhon	(substituted off) 54'
N8	8	Corentin Lecloux
SH	9	Tom Cocqu	(substituted off) 60'
FH	10	Isaac Montoisy
LW	11	Marc Tchangue
IC	12	Ervin Muric
OC	13	Louis De Moffarts
RW	14	Thomas Wallraf	(substituted off) 65'
FB	15	Vincent Hart
Replacements:
HK	16	Martin Jessen	(substituted in) 60'
PR	17	Charles-Henri Berguet	(substituted in) 54'
LK	18	Tuur Moelants	(substituted in) 52'
LK	19	Guillaume Mortier	(substituted in) 71'
N8	20	Maxime Temmerman	(substituted in) 54'
FH	21	Emiel Vermote	(substituted in) 60'
FH	22	Sébastien Kairet	(substituted in) 65'
PR	23	Samuel Opsomer	(substituted in) 60'
Coach:
Guillaume Ajac

LP	1	Guram Gogichashvili	(substituted off) 52'
HK	2	Shalva Mamukashvili	(substituted off) 52'
TP	3	Levan Chilachava	(substituted off) 52'
LL	4	Nodar Tcheishvili
RL	5	Giorgi Nemsadze
BF	6	Giorgi Tkhilaishvili	(substituted off) 57'
OF	7	Giorgi Tsutskiridze	(substituted off) 68'
N8	8	Otar Giorgadze
SH	9	Giorgi Begadze	(substituted off) 60'
FH	10	Tedo Abzhandadze	(substituted off) 64'
LW	11	Zurab Dzneladze
IC	12	Giorgi Kveseladze
OC	13	Merab Sharikadze (c)
RW	14	Mirian Modebadze
FB	15	Soso Matiashvili	(substituted off) 60'
Replacements:
HK	16	Vano Karkadze	(substituted in) 52'
PR	17	Zurab Zhvania	(substituted in) 52'
PR	18	Beka Gigashvili	(substituted in) 52'
FL	19	Shalva Sutiashvili	(substituted in) 57'
FL	20	Beka Saghinadze	(substituted in) 68'
SH	21	Gela Aprasidze	(substituted in) 60'
FH	22	Lasha Khmaladze	(substituted in) 64'
WG	23	Giorgi Aptsiauri	(substituted in) 60'
Coach:
Milton Haig

Touch judges:
Mike Todd (Scotland)
Alistair Watt (Scotland)

3 March 2019
12:45 CET (UTC+01)

Spain	21–18	Romania (1 LBP)
Try: López Pérez 27' c Gimeno 45' c Barthère 65' c Con: Linklater (3/3) 28', 46', 66'	RE Report; WR Report	Try: Dumitru 7' c Zaharia 69' m Con: Vlaicu (1/1) 8'; Pen: Vlaicu (2) 1', 17'

Estadio Nacional Complutense, Madrid
Attendance: 6,900
Referee: Adam Jones (Wales)

LP	1	Fernando López Pérez (c)		(substituted off) 60'
HK	2	Stephen Barnes		(substituted off) 51'
TP	3	Xerom Civil Bonaventure	(yellow card) 55' to 65'			(substituted off) 69'
LL	4	Mickael De Marco		(substituted off) 72'
RL	5	Manu Mora		(substituted off) 54'
BF	6	Victor Sánchez Borrego		(substituted off) 57'	(substituted in) 65'
OF	7	Lucas Guillaume
N8	8	Pierre Barthère		(substituted off) 78'
SH	9	Facundo Munilla
FH	10	Lucas Rubio
LW	11	Jordi Jorba Jorge
IC	12	Alvar Gimeno
OC	13	Richard Stewart
RW	14	Julen Goia Iriberri		(substituted off) 62'
FB	15	Brad Linklater
Replacements:
PR	16	Jean-Baptiste Custoja		(substituted in) 60'
HK	17	Quentin García		(substituted in) 51'
LK	26	Michael Walker-Fitton		(substituted in) 72'
N8	19	Oier Goia Iriberri		(substituted in) 54'
SH	20	Kerman Aurrekoetxea		(substituted in) 78'
FH	21	Andrea Rabago
FB	22	Hugo Alonso		(substituted in) 62'
PR	23	Jon Zabala		(substituted in) 57'	(substituted off) 65'	(substituted in) 69'
Coach:
Santiago Santos

LP	1	Constantin Pristăviță		(substituted off) 60'
HK	2	Eugen Căpățână		(substituted off) 54'
TP	3	Alexandru Țăruș		(substituted off) 60'
LL	4	Johan van Heerden	(yellow card) 52' to 62'	(substituted off) 71'
RL	5	Marius Antonescu
BF	6	Andrei Gorcioaia		(substituted off) 59'
OF	7	Mihai Macovei (c)
N8	8	Cristian Chirică
SH	9	Florin Surugiu	(yellow card) 29' to 39'	(substituted off) 71'
FH	10	Florin Vlaicu		(substituted off) 57'
LW	11	Ionuț Dumitru
IC	12	Tangimana Fonovai		(substituted off) 50'
OC	13	Cătălin Fercu
RW	14	Vladut Zaharia
FB	15	Marius Simionescu
Replacements:
HK	16	Ovidiu Cojocaru		(substituted in) 54'
PR	17	Iulian Hartig		(substituted in) 60'
PR	18	Alex Gordaș		(substituted in) 60'
LK	19	Dorin Lazăr		(substituted in) 59'
FL	20	Adrian Ion		(substituted in) 71'
SH	21	Tudorel Bratu		(substituted in) 71'
SH	22	Daniel Plai		(substituted in) 57'
CE	23	Nicolas Onotu		(substituted in) 50'
Coach:
Marius Țincu

Touch judges:
Aled Evans (Wales)
Richard Brace (Wales)

=== Week 4 ===
9 March 2019
14:00 EET (UTC+02)

Romania	22–20	Russia (1 LBP)
Try: Penalty try 29' c Pen: Vlaicu 3', 31', 37'; Melinte 53', 74'	RE Report; WR Report	Try: Artemyev 9' m Selskii 45' m Vavilin 61' m Gadzhiev 80' m

Stadionul Municipal, Botoșani
Attendance: 1,200
Referee: Pierre Brousset (France)

LP	1	Constantin Pristăviță	(substituted off) 64'
HK	2	Eugen Căpățână	(substituted off) 64'
TP	3	Alexandru Țăruș	(substituted off) 64'
LL	4	Johan van Heerden	(substituted off) 68'
RL	5	Marius Antonescu
BF	6	Andre Gorin
OF	7	Adrian Ion (c)
N8	8	Cristi Chirică	(substituted off) 40'
SH	9	Florin Surugiu	(substituted off) 67'
FH	10	Florin Vlaicu	(substituted off) 47'
LW	11	Ionuț Dumitru
IC	12	Tangimana Fonovai
OC	13	Nicolas Onuțu	(substituted off) 68'
RW	14	Vladut Zaharia
FB	15	Marius Simionescu
Replacements:
HK	16	Ovidiu Cojocaru	(substituted in) 64'
PR	17	Iulian Hartig	(substituted in) 64'
PR	18	Alex Gordaș	(substituted in) 64'
LK	19	Ionuț Mureșan	(substituted in) 68'
FL	20	Dorin Lazăr	(substituted in) 40'
SH	21	Alexandru Tigla	(substituted in) 67'
CE	22	Ionel Melinte	(substituted in) 47'
FB	23	Vlăduț Popa	(substituted in) 68'
Coach:
Marius Țincu

LP	1	Andrei Polivalov		(substituted off) 68'
HK	2	Stanislav Selskii	(yellow card) 29' to 39'
TP	3	Vladimir Podrezov		(substituted off) 40'
LL	4	Andrei Ostrikov
RL	5	Andrei Garbuzov		(substituted off) 56'
BF	6	Anton Sychev		(substituted off) 31'
OF	7	Tagir Gadzhiev
N8	8	Nikita Vavilin		(substituted off) 68'
SH	9	Dmitrii Perov		(substituted off) 50'
FH	10	Yuri Kushnarev		(substituted off) 75'
LW	11	Mikhail Babaev		(substituted off) 77'
IC	12	Dmitri Gerasimov
OC	13	Vladimir Ostroushko
RW	14	German Davydov	(yellow card) 22' to 32'
FB	15	Vasily Artemyev (c)
Replacements:
HK	16	Evgeni Matveev		(substituted in) 31'
PR	17	Evgeny Mishechkin		(substituted in) 68'
PR	18	Innokenty Zykov		(substituted in) 40'
LK	19	Bogdan Fedotko		(substituted in) 56'
CE	20	Vitaly Zhivatov		(substituted in) 68'
SH	21	Alexey Shcherban		(substituted in) 50'
N8	22	Ramil Gaisin		(substituted in) 75'
FH	23	Viktor Kononov		(substituted in) 77'
Coach:
Lyn Jones

Touch judges:
Thomas Charabas (France)
Luc Ramos (France)

10 March 2019
16:00 GET (UTC+04)

(1 TBP) Georgia	52–3	Germany
Try: Modebadze (3) 1' c, 54' c, 59' m Khmaladze 3' c Mamukashvili 22' c Malaghuradze 45' c Lobzhanidze 62' c Sharikadze 76' m Con: Aprasidze (5) 2', 5', 23', 46', 55'; Matiashvili 63'	RE Report; WR Report	Pen: Hilsenbeck 7'

AIA Arena, Kutaisi
Attendance: 6,000
Referee: Keith Allen (Scotland)

LP	1	Zurab Zhvania	(yellow card) 29' to 39'			(substituted off) 51'	(substituted in) 71'
HK	2	Shalva Mamukashvili					(substituted off) 71'
TP	3	Beka Gigashvili		(substituted off) 51'
LL	4	Shalva Sutiashvili
RL	5	Giorgi Nemsadze		(substituted off) 51'
BF	6	Beka Saghinadze		(substituted off) 30'	(substituted in) 39'	(substituted off) 61'
OF	7	Giorgi Tsutskiridze
N8	8	Otar Giorgadze
SH	9	Gela Aprasidze		(substituted off) 61'
FH	10	Tedo Abzhandadze		(substituted off) 65'
LW	11	Soso Matiashvili
IC	12	Lasha Malaghuradze
OC	13	Merab Sharikadze (c)
RW	14	Mirian Modebadze
FB	15	Lasha Khmaladze		(substituted off) 61'
Replacements:
HK	16	Tornike Mataradze					(substituted in) 77'
PR	17	Giorgi Melikidze		(substituted in) 51'
PR	18	Levan Chilachava		(substituted in) 30'	(substituted off) 39'	(substituted in) 51'	(substituted off) 77'
LK	19	Davit Gigauri				(substituted in) 61'
FL	20	Nodar Tcheishvili		(substituted in) 51'
SH	21	Vasil Lobzhanidze		(substituted in) 61'
WG	22	Davit Kacharava		(substituted in) 65'
WG	23	Alexander Todua		(substituted in) 61'
Coach:
Milton Haig

LP	1	Julius Nostadt	(yellow card) 53' to 63'		(substituted off) 66'
HK	2	Dasch Barber
TP	3	Sammy Füchsel		(substituted off) 14'
LL	4	Jörn Schröder		(substituted off) 43'
RL	5	Eric Marks
BF	6	Emil Rupf
OF	7	Felix Martel		(substituted off) 53'
N8	8	Jaco Otto (c)
SH	9	Tim Menzel		(substituted off) 69'
FH	10	Christopher Hilsenbeck		(substituted off) 73'
LW	11	Felix Lammers
IC	12	Eden Syme		(substituted off) 61'
OC	13	Wynston Cameron-Dow
RW	14	Vito Lammers
FB	15	Nikolai Klewinghaus
Replacements:
HK	16	Senzo Ngubane		(substituted in) 43'
PR	17	Tobias Williams		(substituted in) 53'
PR	18	Antony Dickinson		(substituted in) 14'	(substituted off) 66'
FL	19	Paul Artur Franz Schüle		(substituted in) 66'
FL	20	Marcus Bender		(substituted in) 66'
SH	21	Morne Laubscher		(substituted in) 59'
WG	22	Samuel Harris		(substituted in) 73'
CE	23	Harris Aounallah		(substituted in) 61'
Coach:
Mike Ford

Touch judges:
Graeme Ormiston (Scotland)
Bob Nevins (Scotland)

10 March 2019
12:45 CET (UTC+01)

(1 TBP) Spain	47–9	Belgium
Try: Guillaume 3' c Rouet 18' m Gimeno 29' c Linklater 36' c Goia 46' c Walker-Fitton 66' c Jorba Jorge 75' c Con: Linklater (6) 3', 30', 37', 47', 68', 75'	RE Report; WR Report	Pen: De Moffarts (3) 8', 23', 40'

Estadio Nacional Complutense, Madrid
Attendance: 8,100
Referee: Marius Mitrea (Italy)

LP	1	Fernando López Pérez (c)		(substituted off) 48'
HK	2	Beñat Auzqui
TP	3	Xerom Civil Bonaventure		(substituted off) 55'
LL	4	Victor Sánchez Borrego		(substituted off) 63'
RL	5	Manu Mora		(substituted off) 56'
BF	6	Pierre Barthère
OF	7	Lucas Guillaume
N8	8	Goia Oier
SH	9	Guillaume Rouet	(yellow card) 61' to 71'	(substituted off) 71'
FH	10	Sébastien Rouet		(substituted off) 41'
LW	11	Jordi Jorba Jorge
IC	12	Alvar Gimeno		(substituted off) 61'
OC	13	Fabien Perrin		(substituted off) 50'
RW	14	Julen Goia Iriberri
FB	15	Brad Linklater
Replacements:
PR	16	Jean-Baptiste Custoja		(substituted in) 48'
HK	17	Quentin García		(substituted in) 55'
LK	18	Michael Walker-Fitton		(substituted in) 56'
N8	19	Michael Hogg		(substituted in) 63'
SH	20	Lucas Rubio		(substituted in) 71'
FH	21	David Mele		(substituted in) 41'
FB	22	Andrea Rabago		(substituted in) 61'
PR	23	Jon Zabala		(substituted in) 50'
Coach:
Santiago Santos

LP	1	Jean-Baptiste De Clercq		(substituted off) 50'
HK	2	Thomas Dienst (c)		(substituted off) 54'
TP	3	Maxime Jadot		(substituted off) 63'
LL	4	Bertrand Billi		(substituted off) 58'
RL	5	Tom Herenger		(substituted off) 71'
BF	6	Gillian Benoy		(substituted off) 56'
OF	7	Mathieu Verschelden	(yellow card) 1' to 11'
N8	8	William Van Bost	(yellow card) 33' to 43'
SH	9	Tom Cocqu
FH	10	Isaac Montoisy		(substituted off) 41'
LW	11	Craig Dowsett		(substituted off) 58'
IC	12	Ervin Muric
OC	13	Louis De Moffarts
RW	14	Thomas Wallraf
FB	15	Vincent Hart
Replacements:
PR	16	Vincent Tauzia		(substituted in) 54'
HK	17	Alexis Cuffolo		(substituted in) 63'
PR	18	Tuur Moelants		(substituted in) 58'
LK	19	Maxime Ghion		(substituted in) 71'
N8	20	Corentin Lecloux		(substituted in) 56'
FL	21	Louis Debatty		(substituted in) 41'
SH	22	Florian Piron		(substituted in) 58'
PR	23	Romain Pinte		(substituted in) 50'
Coach:
Guillaume Ajac

Touch judges:
Vincenzo Schipani (Italy)
Simone Boaretto (Italy)

=== Week 5 ===
17 March 2019
15:00 MSK (UTC+03)

Russia	6–22	Georgia (1 TBP)
Pen: Kushnarev 30', 56'	RE report WR report	Try: Penalty try 40' c Tsutskiridze 45' m Modebadze 64' c Con: Malaghuradze 65'; Pen: Matiashvili 8'

Kuban Stadium, Krasnodar
Attendance: 5,850
Referee: Tom Foley (England)

LP	1	Valery Morozov		(substituted off) 60'	(substituted in) 63'
HK	2	Stanislav Selskii		(substituted off) 60'
TP	3	Innokenty Zykov		(substituted off) 56'
LL	4	Andrei Ostrikov		(substituted off) 51'
RL	5	Andrei Garbuzov
BF	6	Anton Sychev
OF	7	Tagir Gadzhiev		(substituted off) 68'
N8	8	Vitaly Zhivatov
SH	9	Alexey Shcherban		(substituted off) 65'
FH	10	Yuri Kushnarev		(substituted off) 65'
LW	11	Mikhail Babaev			(substituted off) 63'
IC	12	Dmitri Gerasimov		(substituted off) 73'
OC	13	Vladimir Ostroushko
RW	14	German Davydov
FB	15	Vasily Artemyev (c)
Replacements:
HK	16	Evgeny Matveev		(substituted in) 60'
PR	17	Sergey Sekisov	(yellow card) 63' to 73'	(substituted in) 60'
PR	18	Azamat Bitiev		(substituted in) 56'
LK	19	Bogdan Fedotko		(substituted in) 51'
CE	20	Roman Khodin		(substituted in) 68'
SH	21	Dmitrii Perov		(substituted in) 65'
N8	22	Ramil Gaisin		(substituted in) 65'
FH	23	Viktor Kononov		(substituted in) 73'
Coach:
Lyn Jones

LP	1	Beka Gigashvili	(substituted off) 68'
HK	2	Shalva Mamukashvili	(substituted off) 65'
TP	3	Levan Chilachava	(substituted off) 54'
LL	4	Nodar Tcheishvili	(substituted off) 41'
RL	5	Giorgi Nemsadze
BF	6	Otar Giorgadze	(substituted off) 60'
OF	7	Giorgi Tsutskiridze
N8	8	Beka Gorgadze
SH	9	Vasil Lobzhanidze	(substituted off) 60'
FH	10	Tedo Abzhandadze
LW	11	Giorgi Kveseladze
IC	12	Lasha Malaghuradze	(substituted off) 65'
OC	13	Merab Sharikadze (c)
RW	14	Mirian Modebadze
FB	15	Soso Matiashvili	(substituted off) 65'
Replacements:
HK	16	Zurab Zhvania	(substituted in) 65'
PR	17	Guram Gogichashvili	(substituted in) 68'
PR	18	Giorgi Melikidze	(substituted in) 54'
LK	19	Shalva Sutiashvili	(substituted in) 41'
FL	20	Giorgi Tkhilaishvili	(substituted in) 60'
SH	21	Gela Aprasidze	(substituted in) 60'
WG	22	Lasha Khmaladze	(substituted in) 56'
WG	23	Davit Kacharava	(substituted in) 65'
Coach:
Milton Haig

Touch judges:
Anthony Woodthorpe (England)
Phil Watters (England)

17 March 2019
13:00 CET (UTC+01)

Germany	10–33	Spain (1 TBP)
Try: Henn 82' c Con: Klewinghaus 83'; Pen: Klewinghaus 15'	RE report WR report	Try: García 10' c Norton 22' m Mora 47' m Walter-Fitton 59' c Guillaume 66' c Con: Rabago 11', 60', 67'

Sportpark Höhenberg, Köln
Attendance: 2,200
Referee: Andrea Piardi (Italy)

LP	1	Tobias Williams	(substituted off) 48'
HK	2	Dasch Barber
TP	3	Sammy Füchsel	(substituted off) 36'
LL	4	Jörn Schröder	(substituted off) 64'
RL	5	Eric Marks	(substituted off) 68'
BF	6	Emil Rupf	(substituted off) 48'
OF	7	Jaco Otto (c)
N8	8	Marcel Henn
SH	9	Tim Menzel	(substituted off) 66'
FH	10	Nikolai Klewinghaus
LW	11	Felix Lammers
IC	12	Wynston Cameron-Dow	(substituted off) 66'
OC	13	Vito Lammers
RW	14	Carlos Soteras-Merz	(substituted off) 75'
FB	15	Marcel Coetzee
Replacements:
HK	16	Felix Martel	(substituted in) 48'
PR	17	Julius Nostadt	(substituted in) 48'
PR	18	Mathias Schösser	(substituted in) 36'
FL	19	Antony Dickinson	(substituted in) 64'
FL	20	Michail Tyumenev	(substituted in) 68'
SH	21	Morne Laubscher	(substituted in) 66'
WG	22	Samuel Harris	(substituted in) 68'
CE	23	Rafael Pyrasch	(substituted in) 75'
Coach:
Mike Ford

LP	1	Fernando López Pérez (c)	(substituted off) 68'
HK	2	Quentin García	(substituted off) 68'
TP	3	Xerom Civil Bonaventure
LL	4	Michael Walter-Fitton	(substituted off) 60'
RL	5	Joshua Peters	(substituted off) 68'
BF	6	Victor Sánchez Borrego
OF	7	Lucas Guillaume
N8	8	Manuel Mora	(substituted off) 70'
SH	9	Lucas Rubio
FH	10	Andrew Norton	(substituted off) 48'
LW	11	Jordi Jorba	(substituted off) 70'
IC	12	Álvar Gimeno
OC	13	Andrea Rabago
RW	14	Julen Goia Iriberri	(substituted off) 58'
FB	15	Richard Stewart
Replacements:
PR	16	Thierry Futen	(substituted in) 68'
HK	17	Diego Carvajales	(substituted in) 68'
LK	18	Ien Ascroft-leigh	(substituted in) 60'
FL	19	Juan Pablo Guido	(substituted in) 70'
SH	20	Facundo Munilla	(substituted in) 48'
CE	21	Federico Casteglioni	(substituted in) 70'
FB	22	Hugo Alonso	(substituted in) 58'
PR	23	Jon Zabala	(substituted in) 44'
Coach:
Santiago Santos

Touch judges:
Federico Vedovelli (Italy)
Matteo Giacomini (Italy)

17 March 2019
13:00 CET (UTC+01)

Belgium	17–43	Romania (1 TBP)
Try: Dienst 47' c Decubber 76' c Con: Williams (1/1) 48'; Hamzaoui (1/1) 77'; Pen: Williams 2'	RE report WR report	Try: Lazăr 29' c Nistor 34' m Zaharia 39' m Penalty try 49' c Cojocaru 69' c Con: Plai (2/4) 30', 69'; Pen: Plai (4) 1', 8', 15', 51'

King Baudouin Stadium – Annex 2, Brussels
Attendance: 3,000
Referee: Craig Evans (Wales)

LP	1	Jean-Baptiste Le Clercq		(substituted off) 70'
HK	2	Thomas Dienst (c)		(substituted off) 62'
TP	3	Maxime Jadot		(substituted off) 52'
LL	4	Bertrand Billi
RL	5	Tom Herenger		(substituted off) 21'
BF	6	Gillian Benoy
OF	7	Jean-Maurice Decubber
N8	8	Corentin Lecloux
SH	9	Tom Cocqu		(substituted off) 68'
FH	10	Vincent Hart		(substituted off) 17'
LW	11	Craig Dowsett
IC	12	Ervin Muric
OC	13	Nathan Bontems		(substituted off) 62'	(substituted in) 68'
RW	14	Thomas Wallraf
FB	15	Alan Williams			(substituted off) 68'
Replacements:
PR	16	Alexis Cuffolo		(substituted in) 64'
PR	17	Bastien Gallaire		(substituted in) 52'
LK	18	Lucas Sotteau		(substituted in) 21'	(substituted off) 28'
FL	19	Tuur Moelants			(substituted in) 28'
CE	20	Amin Hamzaoui		(substituted in) 62'
FH	21	Louis de Moffarts		(substituted in) 68'
SH	22	Marc Tchangué	(yellow card) 65' to 75'	(substituted in) 68'
PR	23	Romain Pinte		(substituted in) 70'
Coach:
Guillaume Ajac

LP	1	Constantin Pristăviță		(substituted off) 64'
HK	2	Eugen Căpățână		(substituted off) 64'
TP	3	Alex Gordaș		(substituted off) 66'
LL	4	Johan van Heerden		(substituted off) 60'
RL	5	Marius Antonescu	(yellow card) 45' to 55'
BF	6	Vlad Nistor
OF	7	Adrian Ion (c)
N8	8	Dorin Lazăr		(substituted off) 64'
SH	9	Florin Surugiu		(substituted off) 66'
FH	10	Daniel Plai
LW	11	Nicolas Onuțu
IC	12	Vlăduț Popa		(substituted off) 40'
OC	13	Alexandru Bucur
RW	14	Vlad Zaharia		(substituted off) 61'
FB	15	Marius Simionescu
Replacements:
PR	16	Ovidiu Cojocaru		(substituted in) 64'
HK	17	Iulian Hartig		(substituted in) 64'
PR	18	Vasile Bălan		(substituted in) 66'
LK	19	Ionuț Mureșan		(substituted in) 64'
FL	20	Vlad Neculau		(substituted in) 60'
SH	21	Alexandru Țiglă		(substituted in) 66'
CE	22	Florin Vlaicu		(substituted in) 40'
CE	23	Ionuț Dumitru		(substituted in) 61'
Coach:
Marius Țincu

Touch judges:
Mike English (Wales)
Chris Oliver (Wales)

== Relegation/promotion play-off ==
15 June 2019
13:50 CET (UTC+01)

Germany	32–37	Portugal
	Gamesheet

Frankfurt
Attendance: 800
Referee: Sean Gallagher (Ireland)

== See also ==
- Rugby Europe International Championships
- 2018–19 Rugby Europe International Championships
- Six Nations Championship
- Antim Cup
