= Moa Mua Maliepo =

Romania international rugby union player

- Full name: Moa Mua Maliepo
- Born: 12 May 1996 (age 30) New Zealand
- Height: 1.85 m (6 ft 1 in)
- Weight: 97 kg (15 st 4 lb; 214 lb)
- Notable relative: Patricia Maliepo (sister)

Rugby union career
- Position: Centre
- Current team: Timișoara Saracens
Senior career
Years	Team	Apps	(Points)
- Two Blues
2015–19	CSM București	24	(30)
2019–Present	Timișoara Saracens	3	(5)
- Correct as of 28 February 2020
International career
Years	Team	Apps	(Points)
2020–Present	Romania	2	(5)
- Correct as of 28 February 2020

Moa Mua Maliepo (born 12 May 1996) is a New Zealand-born Romanian rugby union football player. He plays as a centre positions for professional SuperLiga club Timișoara Saracens.

== Club career ==
Before joining Timișoara Saracens, Moa Mua Maliepo played for Parramatta Two Blues and most recently for CSM București, from where he transferred to Saracens following the dissolution of his former club.

== International career ==
Maliepo also plays for Romania's national team, the Oaks, making his international debut during the Week 3 of 2020 Rugby Europe Championship in a test match against the Los Leones.

== Honours ==
CSM București

- Romanian Cup: 2018, 2019
