= Vlăduț Zaharia =

Romania international rugby union player

- Full name: Daniel Vlăduț Zaharia
- Born: 12 January 1995 (age 31) Bârlad, Romania
- Height: 1.75 m (5 ft 9 in)
- Weight: 80 kg (12 st 8 lb; 180 lb)
- University: Universitatea de Vest din Timișoara

Rugby union career
- Position: Wing
- Current team: Timișoara Saracens
Youth career
- 2011–14: CSS Bârlad
Senior career
Years	Team	Apps	(Points)
2014–15	RC Bârlad		
2015–present	Timișoara Saracens	18	(50)
- Correct as of 13 July 2019
International career
Years	Team	Apps	(Points)
2018–present	Romania	8	(20)
- Correct as of 9 March 2019
National sevens team
Years	Team		Comps
2019–	Romania 7`s		1

Daniel Vlăduț Zaharia (born 12 January 1995) is a Romanian rugby union player who plays as a wing for professional SuperLiga club Timișoara Saracens.

== Club career ==
Vlăduț Zaharia started playing rugby as a youth for CSS Bârlad then moved to the seniors team RC Bârlad. In 2015 he was signed by Timișoara Saracens.

== International career ==
In November 2018, he was called for Romania's national team, the Oaks, being part of the 34 man squad assembled in preparation for a match against the Os Lobos held for the Relegation/Promotion Play-Off of the 2018 Rugby Europe Championship, making his test debut on this occasion.
