= Costel Burțilă =

Romanian rugby union player

- Full name: Costel Burțilă
- Born: 14 July 1991 (age 35)
- Height: 1.86 m (6 ft 1 in)
- Weight: 120 kg (18 st 13 lb; 260 lb)

Rugby union career
- Position: Prop
- Current team: Hyères-Carqueiranne-La Crau
Senior career
Years	Team	Apps	(Points)
2012–15	Stade Rodez Aveyron	32	(5)
2015–16	Cognac	16	(0)
2016–18	Lavaur	44	(0)
2018–19	Trélissac	22	(5)
2019–Present	Hyères-Carqueiranne-La Crau	10	(0)
- Correct as of 27 March 2019
International career
Years	Team	Apps	(Points)
2020–Present	Romania	2	(0)
- Correct as of 9 March 2019

Costel Burțilă (born 14 July 1991) is a Romanian rugby union player. He plays as a prop for French Fédérale 1 club Hyères-Carqueiranne-La Crau.

== Club career ==
Costel Burțilă played mostly of his career in French Fédérale 1 league system. His started his rugby career in France in 2012 with Stade Rodez Aveyron. In 2015 he was signed by Fédérale 1 club Cognac playing there for only a season. In 2016 followed a move to Lavaur where he played for two seasons and in 2018 he was signed by Fédérale 1 club Trélissac. After just one season with Trélissac he was signed Hyères-Carqueiranne-La Crau in 2019.

== International career ==
Burțilă is also selected for Romania's national team, the Oaks, making his international debut during the Week 2 of 2020 Rugby Europe Championship in a test match against the Os Lobos.
