= Giorgi Nutsubidze =

Georgian rugby player (born 1998)

- Born: Giorgi Nutsubidze; 11 November 1998 (age 28) Tbilisi, Georgia
- Height: 1.81 m (5 ft 11 1/2 in)
- Weight: 112 kg (17 st 9 lb; 247 lb)

Rugby union career
- Position: Loosehead prop
Senior career
Years	Team	Apps	(Points)
2017–18	Lelo Saracens	3	(0)
2018-	Biarritz Olympique	110	(0)
- Correct as of 16 April 2026
International career
Years	Team	Apps	(Points)
2016-2017	Georgia U18	6	(0)
2018-2019	Georgia U20	4	(0)
2021	Georgia	1	(0)

Giorgi Nutsubidze (born 11 November 1998 in Tbilisi, Georgia) is a rugby union player who currently plays for Biarritz Olympique in the Pro D2 and has played internationally for Georgia national rugby union team as a loosehead prop.

== Georgian national team ==
He made his first appearance for the Georgian national team coming off the bench in a 16–7 win over Russia in 2021.
