= Craig Dowsett =

Australian rules footballer

Personal information
- Full name: Craig Dowsett
- Born: 9 February 1960 (age 66)
- Original team: Leopold
- Height: 175 cm (5 ft 9 in)
- Weight: 76 kg (168 lb)

Playing career^{1}
| Years | Club | Games (Goals) |
| 1978–1981 | Geelong | 8 (0) |
- ^{1} Playing statistics correct to the end of 1981.

Craig Dowsett (born 9 February 1960) is a former Australian rules footballer who played with Geelong in the Victorian Football League (VFL).

Dowsett was recruited locally, from Leopold. He made four appearances in the 1978 VFL season, including Geelong's elimination final loss to Carlton. Over the next three seasons he added just four more games to his tally.

He later played for Golden Square in the Bendigo Football League and won the Michelsen Medal in 1986.
