= Alexandru Gordaș =

Romania international rugby union player

Alex Gordaș
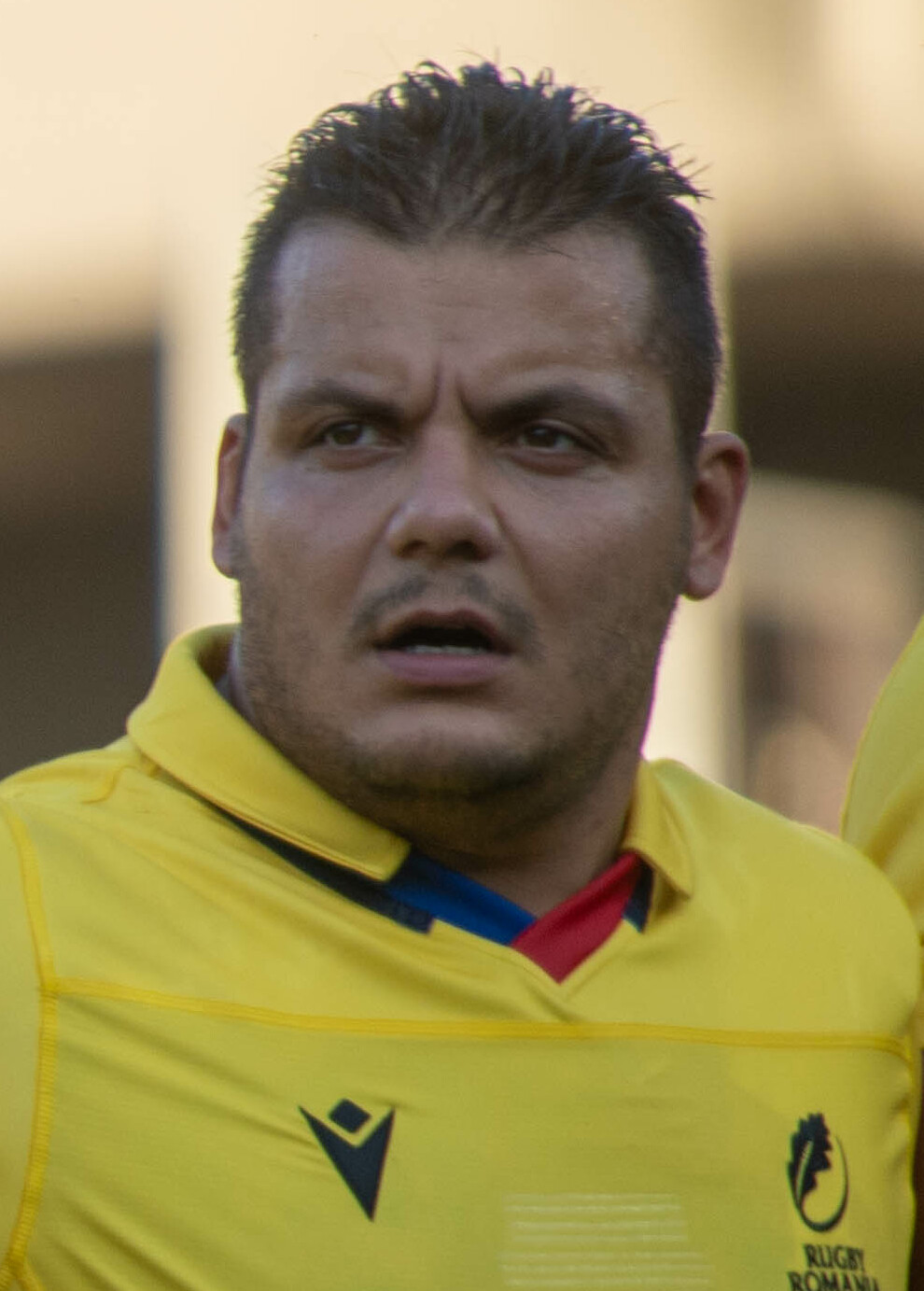
- Alexandru Gordaș playing for Romania
- Full name: Alexandru Gabriel Gordaș
- Born: 11 May 1994 (age 32) Romania
- Height: 1.86 m (6 ft 1 in)
- Weight: 120 kg (18 st 13 lb; 260 lb)

Rugby union career
- Position: Prop
- Current team: CSM București
Senior career
Years	Team	Apps	(Points)
2013–2014	CSM București	10	(0)
2014–2015	Worcester Warriors	1	(0)
2015–2016	CSM București	17	(0)
2016–18	Steaua București	19	(5)
2018–19	CSM București		
- Correct as of 24 March 2017
International career
Years	Team	Apps	(Points)
2013–	Romania	12	(5)
- Correct as of 1 October 2018

Alexandru "Alex" Gabriel Gordaș (born 11 May 1994) is a Romanian rugby union football player. He played in the prop position for SuperLiga club CSM București. He also plays for Romania's national team, the Oaks, making his international debut at the 2015 World Rugby Nations Cup in a match against the Argentina Jaguares.

== Career ==
Before joining Steaua București, Alex Gordaș played for Olimpia București and Worcester Warriors.
