= Maxime Jadot =

Belgian banker (born 1957)

Maxime Jadot (French: [maxim ʒado]; born 17 December 1957 in Brussels) is a Belgian banker who is currently Chairman of BNP Paribas Fortis. He studied law at the Katholieke Universiteit Leuven and Georgetown University in the United States.

== Banker ==
Max Jadot has mostly worked at the same financial institution. In 1983 he began work at Generale Bank, subsequently developing his career within its successor Fortis, where he served in various posts. Fortis was then later absorbed into the BNP Paribas Group.

At Generale Bank, Max Jadot was successively a branch manager (1984), Area Manager for Brussels (1986), Head of the Marketing Department for the Brussels area (1989), Brussels Regional Manager (1990) and Head of Marketing, Audit and Organisation for the Northeast Belgium area (1996). At Fortis Bank, he became General Manager for Corporate Finance and Capital Markets (1998), was appointed chairman of the management board of Fortis Banque France and Country Manager for Fortis France (2007), and was a member of the executive committee of Fortis Bank and Head of Public, Corporate and Commercial Banking Belgium (from 2009).

In 2010 Max Jadot joined the executive board of the newly established BNP Paribas Fortis. In 2011 he was appointed CEO and chairman of the bank's executive board, succeeding Jean-Laurent Bonnafé. He also became a member of the executive committee of BNP Paribas based in Paris. On 1 January 2023, Max Jadot succeeded Herman Daems as chairman of the board of directors of BNP Paribas Fortis.

From 1994 until 2019 Max Jadot held a seat on the board of the steelmaker Bekaert. Maxime Jadot is also the great-grandson of Leo Leander Bekaert.
