= Martín Alonso =

Spanish rugby union player (born 1999)

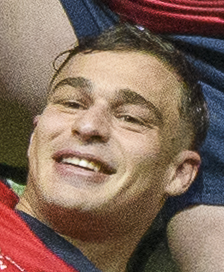
- Born: Martín Alonso Muñoz; 2 December 1999 (age 26) Valladolid, Spain
- Height: 1.85 m (6 ft 1 in)
- Weight: 75 kg (11 st 11 lb)

Rugby union career
- Position: Winger
- Current team: Colomiers Rugby
Senior career
Years	Team	Apps	(Points)
2020–2023	La Rochelle	20	(20)
2023-2024	Rugby Club Vannes	12	(10)
2024-	Colomiers Rugby	2	(0)
International career
Years	Team	Apps	(Points)
2020–	Spain	4	(0)
- Correct as of 25 December 2024
National sevens team
Years	Team		Comps
2018-2020	Spain 7s		21

Martín Alonso Muñoz (born 2 December 1999) is a Spanish rugby union winger and he currently plays for Colomiers Rugby in the French Pro D2.

He is an international player with both 7's and XV sides.
