= Iulian Hartig =

Romania international rugby union player

- Full name: Iulian Hartig
- Born: 11 October 1998 (age 28)
- Height: 1.79 m (5 ft 10 1/2 in)
- Weight: 105 kg (16 st 7 lb; 231 lb)

Rugby union career
- Position: Prop
Youth career
- ?–2017: Clubul Sportiv Școlar nr. 2 Baia Mare
Senior career
Years	Team	Apps	(Points)
2017–19	CSM București	13	
- Correct as of 4 August 2019
International career
Years	Team	Apps	(Points)
2019–present	Romania	3	(0)
- Correct as of 4 August 2019

Iulian Hartig (also Harțig; born 11 October 1998) is a Romanian rugby union player. He played as a prop for professional SuperLiga club CSM București.

== Club career ==
Hartig started playing rugby as a youth for Romanian club Clubul Sportiv Școlar nr. 2 Baia Mare. In 2017 he was signed by Romanian SuperLiga side, CSM București.

== International career ==
Hartig is also selected for Romania's national team, the Oaks, making his international debut at the 2019 Rugby Europe Championship in a match against Los Leones.
