= Vladislav Sozonov =

Russian rugby union player

- Born: 9 October 1993 (age 33) Kyiv, Ukraine
- Height: 179 cm (5 ft 10 in)
- Weight: 82 kg (181 lb)

Rugby union career
- Position: Wing
- Current team: Lokomotiv Penza
Senior career
Years	Team	Apps	(Points)
2011–2021	VVA-Podmoskovye		
2021–	Lokomotiv Penza		
- Correct as of 14 September 2022
International career
Years	Team	Apps	(Points)
2017–present	Russia	13	(10)
- Correct as of 14 February 2022

Vladislav Sozonov (born 9 October 1993) is a Russian rugby union player who generally plays as a wing and represents Russia internationally.

He has 13 caps for Russia, since 2017, with 2 tries scored, 10 points on aggregate. He made his international debut against Hong Kong on 10 November 2017, in a 16–13 win.

He was included in the Russian squad for the 2019 Rugby World Cup which was held in Japan for the first time and also marked his first World Cup appearance. He had three caps at the competition, without scoring.
