= Demur Tapladze =

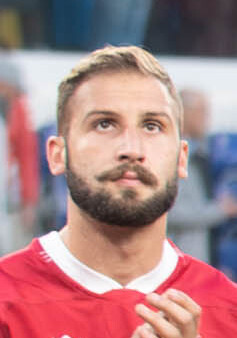
- Born: 18 March 2000 (age 26) Kutaisi, Georgia
- Height: 1.93 m (6 ft 4 in)
- Weight: 94 kg (207 lb; 14 st 11 lb)

Rugby union career
- Position: Centre
- Current team: The Black Lion
Senior career
Years	Team	Apps	(Points)
2018–	Lelo Saracens	5	(0)
2021–	The Black Lion	26	(30)
- Correct as of 12 May 2023
International career
Years	Team	Apps	(Points)
2018–2020	Georgia U20	7	(5)
2020–	Georgia	38	(30)
- Correct as of 1 September 2023

Demur Tapladze (Georgian: დემურ თაფლაძე; born 18 March 2000) is a Georgian professional rugby union player who plays as a centre for Super Cup club The Black Lion and the Georgia national team.

== Professional career ==
He was called in Georgia U20 squad for 2018 World Rugby Under 20 Championship.
