= Evgeny Elgin =

Russian rugby union player

- Born: 10 March 1987 (age 39) Krasnoyarsk
- Height: 1.90 m (6 ft 3 in)
- Weight: 114 kg (17 st 13 lb; 251 lb)

Rugby union career
- Position: Lock
- Current team: Enisey-STM
Senior career
Years	Team	Apps	(Points)
2014-present	Enisey-STM	144	(125)
- Correct as of 22 October 2022
International career
Years	Team	Apps	(Points)
2016–present	Russia	32	(20)
- Correct as of 16 May 2022

Evgeny Elgin also spelled as Evgeni Elgin (born 10 March 1987) is a Russian rugby union player who generally plays as a lock represents Russia internationally.

He was included in the Russian squad for the 2019 Rugby World Cup which was held in Japan for the first time and also marked his first World Cup appearance.

== Career ==
He made his international debut for Russia against Germany on 13 February 2016.

Honours

- Russian Championships (7): 2014, 2016, 2017, 2018, 2019, 2020-21, 2021-22
- Russian Cup (6): 2014, 2016, 2017, 2020, 2021, 2022
- Russian Supercup (3): 2014, 2015, 2017
- European Rugby Continental Shield: 2017-18
