= Andrey Polivalov =

Russian rugby union player

- Born: 9 August 1986 (age 40) Penza
- Height: 1.85 m (6 ft 1 in)
- Weight: 109 kg (17 st 2 lb; 240 lb)

Rugby union career
- Position: Prop
- Current team: VVA-Podmoskovye
Senior career
Years	Team	Apps	(Points)
2005-2007	Imperia Penza (Rugby League)		
2008-2012	Imperia Penza		
2013	Strela Kazan	20	(10)
2014-2018	Enisey-STM		
2019-present	VVA-Podmoskovye		
- Correct as of 14 September 2019
International career
Years	Team	Apps	(Points)
2013–present	Russia	25	(5)
- Correct as of 14 September 2019

Andrey Polivalov also spelled as Andrei Polivalov (born 9 August 1986) is a Russian rugby union player who generally plays as a prop represents Russia internationally.

He was included in the Russian squad for the 2019 Rugby World Cup which is scheduled to be held in Japan for the first time and also marks his first World Cup appearance.

== Career ==
He made his international debut for Russia against Georgia on 23 February 2013.
