= Sergey Chernyshev (rugby union) =

Russian rugby union player

- Born: 13 May 1988 (age 38) Moscow
- Height: 1.80 m (5 ft 11 in)
- Weight: 114 kg (17 st 13 lb; 251 lb)

Rugby union career
- Position(s): Hooker, Prop
- Current team: Slava Moscow
Senior career
Years	Team	Apps	(Points)
- Slava Moscow
- Correct as of 9 September 2019
International career
Years	Team	Apps	(Points)
2014–present	Russia	11	(0)
- Correct as of 3 October 2019

Sergey Chernyshev (born 13 May 1988) is a Russian rugby union player who generally plays as a prop represents Russia internationally.

He was included in the Russian squad for the 2019 Rugby World Cup which was held in Japan for the first time and also marks his first World Cup appearance.

== Career ==
Sergey made his international debut for Russia against Hong Kong on 8 November 2014.
