= Davit Gigauri =

Georgian rugby union player

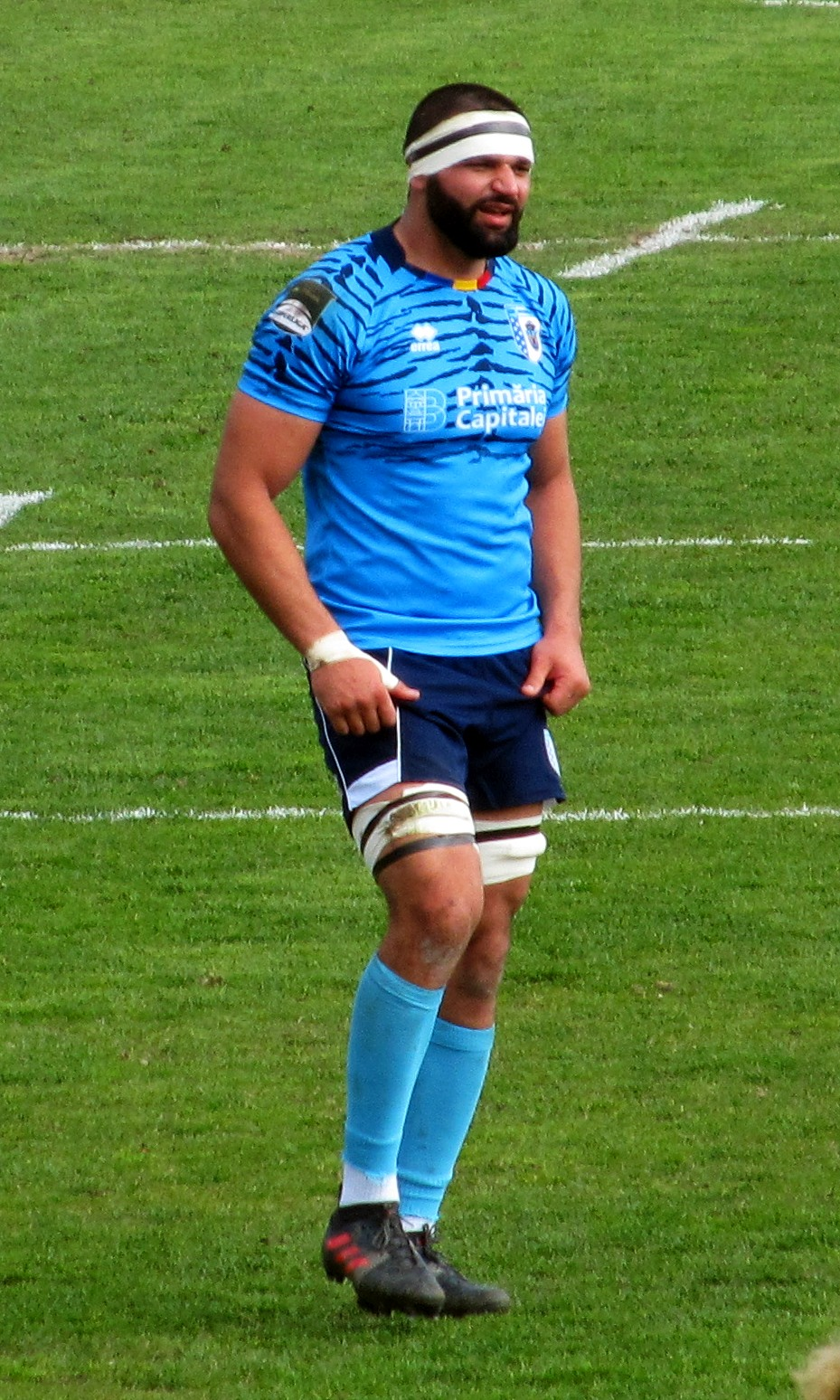
- Davit Gigauri playing for CSM București during the 2019 Cupa României Final
- Born: April 3, 1994 (age 32) Tbilisi, Georgia
- Height: 1.97 m (6 ft 5 1/2 in)
- Weight: 120 kg (18 st 13 lb; 260 lb)

Rugby union career
- Position: Lock
Senior career
Years	Team	Apps	(Points)
2017-2019	CSM București	36	(5)
2019-	US Colomiers	5	(0)
- Correct as of 22 January 2020
International career
Years	Team	Apps	(Points)
2019–	Georgia	3	(5)
- Correct as of 22 January 2020

Davit Gigauri is a Georgian rugby union player who played as a lock for US Colomiers in the Pro D2 and the Georgia national team.
