= Dorin Lazăr =

Romania international rugby union player

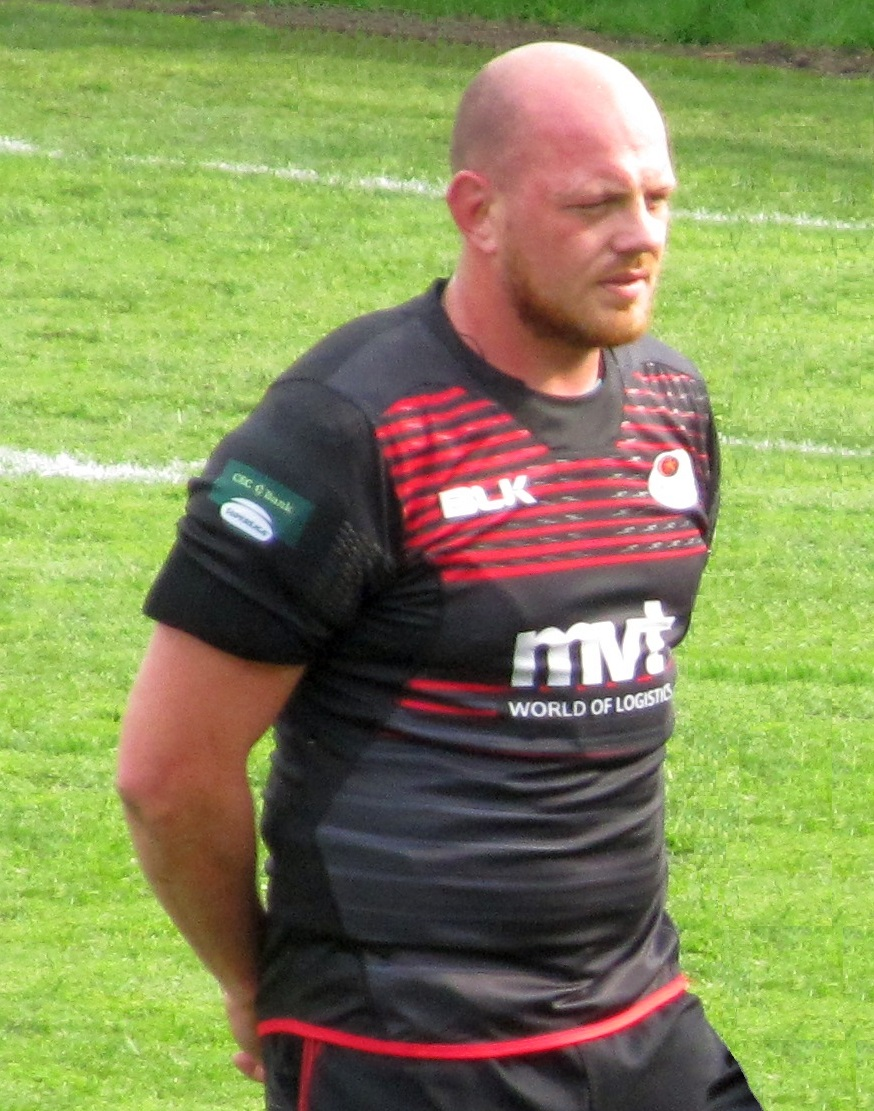
- Dorin Lazăr playing for Timișoara Saracens during the 2019 Cupa României Final
- Full name: Dorin Lazăr
- Born: 23 January 1990 (age 36) Iași, Romania
- Height: 1.96 m (6 ft 5 in)
- Weight: 115 kg (18 st 2 lb; 254 lb)

Rugby union career
- Position: Lock
- Current team: Timișoara
2012–2014	București Wolves		
2013–	Timișoara		
- Correct as of 20 March 2017
International career
Years	Team	Apps	(Points)
2013–	Romania	16	(6)
- Correct as of 20 March 2017

Dorin Lazăr (born 23 January 1990) is a Romanian rugby union football player. He plays in the Lock position for amateur SuperLiga club Timișoara. He also plays for Romania's national team, the Oaks, making his international debut at the 2013 IRB Nations Cup in a match against the Russian Medvedi.

== Career ==
Before joining Timișoara Saracens, Dorin Lazăr played for Steaua and București Wolves.

== Personal life ==
Dorin is the younger brother of Mihai Lazăr who is also a professional rugby union football player who plays for Castres Olympique and the Romania national team.

== Honours ==
Timișoara

- SuperLiga: 2013, 2015
