= Vlăduț Popa =

Romania international rugby union player

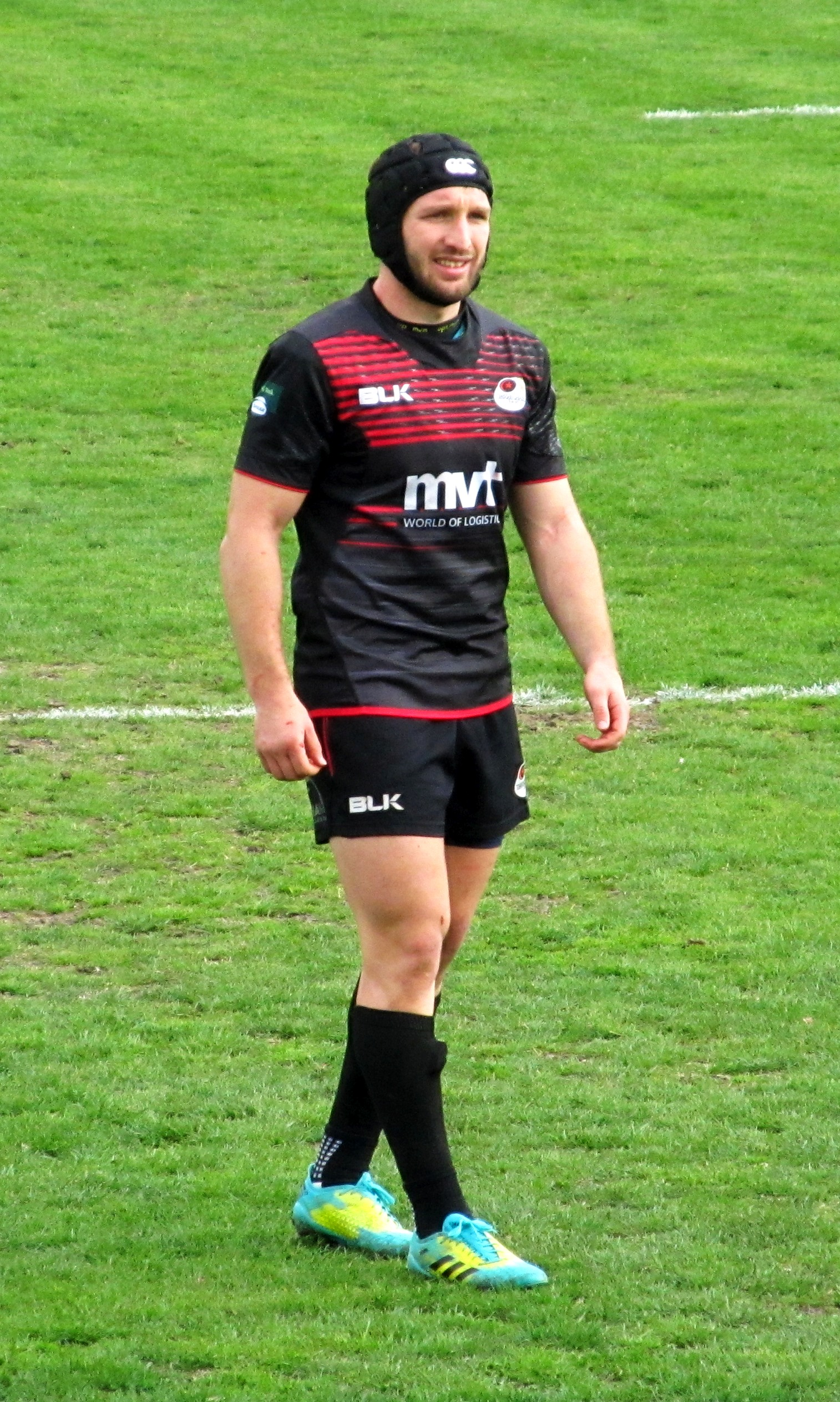
- Vlăduț Popa playing for Timișoara Saracens during the 2019 Cupa României Final
- Born: Florin Vlăduț Popa; 27 March 1996 (age 30) Romania
- Height: 1.80 m (5 ft 11 in)
- Weight: 99 kg (218 lb)

Rugby union career
- Position: Centre
Provincial / State sides
Years	Team	Apps	(Points)
2016–	Timișoara Saracens		
International career
Years	Team	Apps	(Points)
2016–	Romania	8	(5)
- Correct as of 16 February 2019

Florin Vlăduț Popa (born 27 March 1996) is a Romanian rugby union player. He plays as a Centre for professional SuperLiga club Timișoara Saracens. Ioniță also plays for Romania's national team the Oaks.
