= Mirian Modebadze =

Georgian rugby union player

Miriani Modebadze
- Born: October 27, 1997 (age 29) Tbilisi, Georgia
- Height: 1.91 m (6 ft 3 in)
- Weight: 97 kg (214 lb)

Rugby union career
- Position(s): Wing, Full-back
Senior career
Years	Team	Apps	(Points)
2016-	AIA Kutaisi	29	(75)
- Correct as of 28 October 2017
International career
Years	Team	Apps	(Points)
2016-	Georgia U20	12	(15)
2017	Georgia	10	(20)
- Correct as of 16 September 2019

Mirian Modebadze is a Georgian rugby union player. He plays as Wing for AIA Kutaisi in the Georgia Championship. He was called into the Georgia U20 squad for 2017 World Rugby Under 20 Championship.
