= Giorgi Tsutskiridze =

Georgia international rugby union player

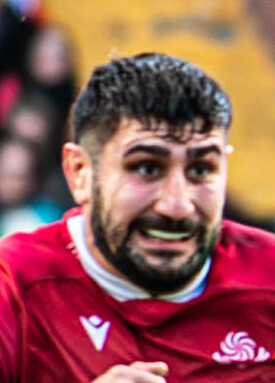
- Born: 26 November 1996 (age 29) Tbilisi, Georgia
- Height: 1.88 m (6 ft 2 in)
- Weight: 104 kg (16 st 5 lb; 229 lb)

Rugby union career
- Position: Flanker,
Senior career
Years	Team	Apps	(Points)
2015-2017	CA Brive	6	
2017-2022	Aurillac	31	(20)
2022–2023	Stade Français		
- Correct as of 26 October 2023
International career
Years	Team	Apps	(Points)
2015	Georgia U18	10	(15)
2015–2016	Georgia U20	9	(5)
2017–	Georgia	17	(15)
- Correct as of 23 July 2021

Giorgi Tsutskiridze (Georgian: გიორგი ცუცქირიძე; born 26 November 1996) is a Georgian Rugby Union player who plays as a Flanker for Top 14 club Stade Français.

== Biography ==
Trained at Soyaux Angoulême XV since 2005, Giorgi Tsutskiridze joined CA Brive in 2013 in the Crabos category.

He was selected in 2015 with the Georgia Under-20 team to compete in the World Junior Trophy. Two years later, he made his first international appearances with the first team: he wore the Georgia jersey for the first time in the match against Belgium, and made several other appearances during the year.

He joined Stade Aurillacois at the end of the 2017 off-season, and then joined the professional squad from the 2018–2019 season.
