= Tudorel Bratu =

Romanian rugby union player

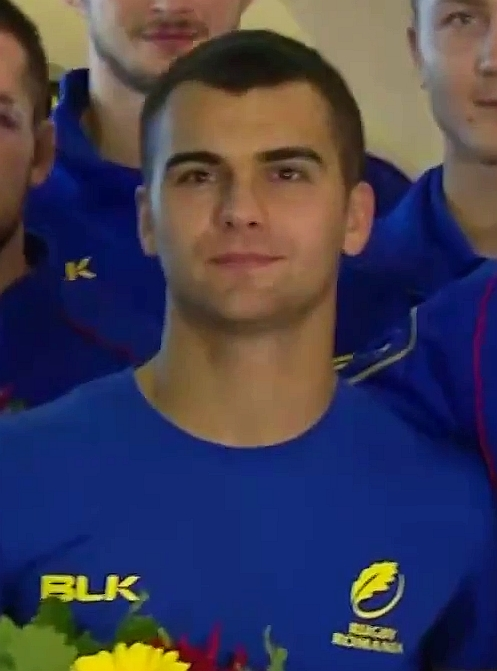
- Tudorel Bratu during a press conference in October 2015, shortly before arriving from the 2015 Rugby World Cup
- Born: 23 April 1991 (age 35)
- Height: 1.75 m (5 ft 9 in)
- Weight: 80 kg (12 st 8 lb; 180 lb)

Rugby union career
- Position: Scrum-half
Provincial / State sides
Years	Team	Apps	(Points)
2013	Farul Constanța	2	(0)
2014	Olimpia București	1	(0)
2015–2018	Dinamo București	22	(113)
2018–2019	CSM București	10	(17)
- Correct as of 21 November 2015
International career
Years	Team	Apps	(Points)
2015–	Romania	8	(0)
- Correct as of 2 July 2017

Tudorel Bratu (born 23 April 1991) is a Romanian rugby union player. He plays in the scrum-half. He played for SuperLiga club CSM București. He was called for the 2015 Rugby World Cup, playing in his first game for Romania, without scoring.
