= Andrey Garbuzov (rugby union) =

Andrey Mikhailovich Garbuzov
- Born: 7 August 1983 (age 43) Krasnoyarsk, Russia
- Height: 1.93 m (6 ft 4 in)
- Weight: 111.5 kg (17 st 8 lb)

Rugby union career
- Position: Blindside Flanker
Senior career
Years	Team	Apps	(Points)
2000–	Krasny Yar		
International career
Years	Team	Apps	(Points)
2005–	Russia	100	(45)

Andrey Mikhailovich Garbuzov (Russian: Андрей Михайлович Гарбузов) (born Krasnoyarsk, 7 August 1983) is a Russian rugby union player. He plays as a flanker.

Garbuzov plays for Krasny Yar Krasnoyarsk since 2000. He won the Russian Championship three times, in 2000, 2001 and 2013, and the Cup of Russia four times, in 2003, 2006, 2011 and 2013. He has been the captain of the team.

He has 91 caps for Russia, since 2005, with 8 tries scored, 40 points on aggregate. He has been a regular player for Russia and was called for the 2011 Rugby World Cup, playing in the four games, one as a substitute, but without scoring. He also participated at the failed qualifyings for the 2015 Rugby World Cup and was a decisive player at the successful qualification for the 2019 Rugby World Cup.
