= Zurab Dzneladze =

Georgian rugby union player

- Born: January 23, 1992 (age 34) Tbilisi, Georgia
- Height: 1.91 m (6 ft 3 in)
- Weight: 95 kg (14 st 13 lb)

Rugby union career
- Position(s): Wing, Full-back
Senior career
Years	Team	Apps	(Points)
2015-	Locomotive Tbilisi	89	(115)
- Correct as of 25 February 2019
International career
Years	Team	Apps	(Points)
2018-	Georgia	9	(5)
- Correct as of 16 September 2019

Zurab Dzneladze is a Georgian rugby union player. He plays as Wing for Locomotive Tbilisi in the Georgia Championship and Georgia national rugby union team.
