= 2022 Rugby Europe Championship =

Rugby union championship

- Date: 5 February 2022 – 20 March 2022
- Countries: Georgia; Netherlands; Portugal; Romania; Russia; Spain

Tournament statistics
- Champions: Georgia (14th title)
- Antim Cup: Georgia (15th title)
- Kiseleff Cup: Romania (1st title)
- Matches played: 12
- Attendance: 47,000 (3,917 per match)
- Tries scored: 96 (8 per match)
- Top point scorer(s): (Spain) Manuel Ordas (55 points)
- Top try scorer(s): (Georgia (country)) Aka Tabutsadze (6 tries)

The 2022 Rugby Europe Championship was the sixth Rugby Europe Championship, the annual rugby union for the top European national teams outside the Six Nations Championship, and the 52nd edition of the competition (including all its previous incarnations as the FIRA Tournament, Rugby Union European Cup, FIRA Nations Cup, FIRA Trophy and European Nations Cup).

The 2022 Championship was contested by Georgia, The Netherlands, Portugal, Romania, Russia and Spain.

Georgia enter the tournament as defending champions. They topped the table after winning all of their matches in the 2021 tournament, claiming their 13th title and 10th Grand Slam as a result.

As in several other sports, Russia were disqualified after Week 3 due to the 2022 Russian invasion of Ukraine.

This year's edition of the Rugby Europe Championship doubles as the second year of the 2023 Rugby World Cup qualifiers for the European region. The winner and runner-up of the two-year cycle automatically qualify for the tournament as Europe 1 and Europe 2 respectively while the team in third place advances to the final qualification tournament as Europe 3.

== Participants ==
Nation	Stadium			Head coach	Captain
Nation	Home stadium	Capacity	Location	Head coach	Captain
Georgia	Boris Paichadze Dinamo Arena	54,202	Tbilisi	(Georgia (country)) Levan Maisashvili	Merab Sharikadze
Netherlands	NRCA Stadium	7,000	Amsterdam	(New Zealand) Zane Gardiner	Bart Wierenga
Portugal	Campo de Rugby do Jamor	2,500	Lisbon	(France) Patrice Lagisquet	Tomás Appleton
Romania	Arcul de Triumf Stadium	8,207	Bucharest	(England) Andy Robinson	Mihai Macovei
Russia	Slava Metreveli Central Stadium	10,200	Sochi	(South Africa) Dick Muir	Victor Gresev
Spain	Estadio Nacional Complutense	15,800	Madrid	(Spain) Santiago Santos	Fernando López

== Table ==
Champions
Disqualified

Pos.	Team	Games				Points			Tries			TBP	LBP	GS	Table points
Pos.	Team	Played	Won	Drawn	Lost	For	Against	Diff	For	Against	Diff	TBP	LBP	GS	Table points
1	Georgia	5	4	1	0	172	73	+99	25	8	+17	2	0	0	20^{[a]}
2	Romania	5	3	0	2	153	128	+25	19	18	+1	1	1	0	14
3	Spain	5	4	0	1	170	135	+35	23	16	+7	1	0	0	12*
4	Portugal	5	2	1	2	139	98	+41	19	11	+8	1	1	0	12^{[a]}
5	Netherlands	5	1	0	4	25	212	-187	3	34	-31	0	0	0	4^{[a]}
6	Russia	5	0	0	5	62	75	-13	7	9	-2	0	1	0	1
Source - Points were awarded to the teams as follows: Win – 4 points | Draw – 2 points | At least 3 more tries than opponent – 1 point | Loss within 7 points – 1 point | Completing a Grand Slam – 1 point^{a} Georgia, Portugal and Netherlands awarded 4 points for cancelled games against Russia * deducted points

== Fixtures ==
=== Week 1 ===
5 February 2022
14:30 EET (UTC+02)

Romania	34–25	Russia
Try: Cojocaru (2) 11' c, 25' c Macovei 40' c Rupanu 72' c Con: Boldor (3/3) 11', 25', 40'; Plai 72'; Pen: Boldor (1/2) 38'; Plai (1/1) 72'	Report	Try: Penalty try 6'; Parkhomenko (2) 62' c, 75' m Con: Gaisin (1/2) 62'; Pen: Gaisin (2/3) 43', 47'

Arcul de Triumf Stadium, Bucharest
Attendance: 2,700
Referee: Adam Leal (England)

LP	1	Vasile Bălan	(substituted off) 74'
HK	2	Ovidiu Cojocaru	(substituted off) 73'
TP	3	Alex Gordaș	(substituted off) 60'
LL	4	Marius Antonescu
RL	5	Adrian Moțoc
BF	6	Cristi Chirică	49' to 58' (substituted off) 64'
OF	7	Dragoș Ser	(yellow card) 6' to 16'
N8	8	Mihai Macovei (c)
SH	9	Gabriel Rupanu
FH	10	Tudor Boldor	(substituted off) 64'
LW	11	Nicolas Onuțu
IC	12	Jason Tomane	(substituted off) 75'
OC	13	Hinckley Vaovasa	(substituted off) 70'
RW	14	Ionuț Dumitru
FB	15	Marius Simionescu	(yellow card) 80'
Replacements:
HK	16	Tudor Butnariu	(substituted on) 73'
PR	17	Constantin Pristăvița	(substituted on) 74'
PR	18	Alexandru Țăruș	(substituted on) 60'
LK	19	Marius Iftimiciuc
N8	20	André Gorin	(substituted on) 49' (substituted off) 58' (substituted on) 64'
WG	21	Paul Popoaia	(substituted on) 70'
FH	22	Daniel Plai	(substituted on) 64'
CE	23	Alexandru Bucur	(substituted on) 75'
Coach:
Andy Robinson

LP	1	Nikoloz Kazalikashvili	(substituted off) 57'
HK	2	Shamil Magomedov	(substituted off) 57'
TP	3	Kirill Gotovtsev (c)	(substituted off) 64'
LL	4	German Silenko	(substituted off) 76'
RL	5	Maxim Gargalîc	(substituted off) 59' (substituted on) 76'
BF	6	Victor Arhip	(yellow card) 69' to 79'
OF	7	Nikita Bekov	(substituted off) 74'
N8	8	Nikita Vavilin
SH	9	Alexey Sherban	(substituted off) 62'
FH	10	Ramil Gaisin
LW	11	Vasily Artemyev	(substituted off) 60'
IC	12	German Davydov
OC	13	Daniil Potikhanov	(substituted off) 74'
RW	14	Andrei Karzanov
FB	15	Dmitry Sukhin
Replacements:
HK	16	Dmitry Parkhomenko	(substituted on) 57'
PR	17	Azamat Bitiev	(substituted on) 57'
PR	18	Vladimir Podrezov	(substituted on) 64'
LK	19	Anton Makarenko	(substituted on) 59' (yellow card) 77' to 80'
FL	20	Vladimir Geraskin	(substituted on) 74'
SH	21	Efim Ryabishchuk	(substituted on) 62'
WG	22	Daniil Semenov	(substituted on) 60'
CE	23	Victor Kononov	(substituted on) 74'
Coach:
Dick Muir

Touch judges:
George Selwood (England)
Mike Woods (England)
Television match official:
Rowan Kitt (England)

5 February 2022
16:00 CET (UTC+01)

(1 TBP) Spain	43–0	Netherlands
Try: Usárraga 10' c López 23' c Jorba 38' m Gimeno 44' c Ordas 56' m Minguillon 65' m Ovejero 71' c Con: Ordas (3/6) 11', 24', 45'; Bélie (1/1) 72'	Report

Estadio Nacional Complutense, Madrid
Attendance: 2,000
Referee: Gianluca Gnecchi (Italy)

LP	1	Fernando López (c)	(substituted off) 46'
HK	2	Marco Pinto	(substituted off) 46'
TP	3	Jon Zabala	(substituted off) 27' (substituted on) 40' (substituted off) 46'
LL	4	Manuel Mora	(substituted off) 51'
RL	5	Víctor Sánchez
BF	6	Asier Usárraga	(substituted off) 67'
OF	7	Matthew Foulds
N8	8	Facundo Domínguez
SH	9	Guillaume Rouet	(substituted off) 57'
FH	10	Manuel Ordas
LW	11	Julen Goia	(substituted off) 48'
IC	12	Álvar Gimeno
OC	13	Fabien Perrin	(substituted off) 60'
RW	14	Jordi Jorba
FB	15	Gauthier Minguillon
Replacements:
PR	16	Gavin van den Berg	(substituted on) 46'
HK	17	Santiago Ovejero	(substituted on) 46'
PR	18	Joel Merkler	(substituted on) 27' (substituted off) 40' (substituted on) 46'
LK	19	Aníbal Bonan	(substituted on) 51'
FL	20	Michael Hogg	(substituted on) 67'
SH	21	Tomás Munilla	(substituted on) 57'
FB	22	Mathieu Bélie	(substituted on) 48'
CE	23	Bautista Güemes	(substituted on) 60'
Coach:
Santiago Santos

LP	1	Hugo Langelaan	(substituted off) 58'
HK	2	Ross Bennie-Coulson	(yellow card) 22' to 32' (substituted off) 51'
TP	3	Andrew Darlington	(substituted off) 51'
LL	4	Christopher van Leeuwen
RL	5	Louis Bruinsma	(substituted off) 51'
BF	6	Christopher Raymond	25' to 32' (substituted off) 68'
OF	7	Wolf van Dijk
N8	8	Dirk Danen (c)
SH	9	Caleb Korteweg	(substituted off) 51'
FH	10	David Weersma
LW	11	Daan van der Avoird
IC	12	Oliva Sialau
OC	13	Bart Wierenga	(substituted off) 1'
RW	14	Jordy Hop
FB	15	Te Hauora Campbell
Replacements:
HK	16	Mike Mbaud	(substituted on) 25' (substituted off) 32' (substituted on) 51'
PR	17	Robin Moenen	(substituted on) 58'
PR	18	Lodi Buijs	(substituted on) 51'
LK	19	Dennis van Dijken	(substituted on) 51'
FL	20	Jade Plane	(substituted on) 68'
SH	21	Mark Coebergh	(substituted on) 51'
FH	22	Mees van Oord	(substituted on) 1' (substituted off) 64'
CE	23	Storm Carroll	(substituted on) 64'
Coach:
Zane Gardiner

Touch judges:
Manuel Bottino (Italy)
Leonardo Masini (Italy)
Television match official:
Emanuele Tomo (Italy)

6 February 2022
15:00 GET (UTC+04)

Georgia	25–25	Portugal
Try: Tabutsadze 29' c Kerdikoshvili 40' m Jalagonia 64' c Con: Abzhandadze (2/3) 30', 64'; Pen: Abzhandadze (2/2) 26', 46'	Report	Try: Cardoso Pinto 36' m Marta 50' c Lima 58' c Con: Marques (2/3) 52', 59'; Pen: Marques (2/2) 10', 28'

Mikheil Meskhi Stadium, Tbilisi
Attendance: 7,000
Referee: Romain Poite (France)

LP	1	Guram Gogichashvili	(substituted off) 55' (substituted on) 68'
HK	2	Vano Karkadze	(substituted off) 46'
TP	3	Beka Gigashvili	(substituted off) 22'
LL	4	Grigor Kerdikoshvili	(substituted off) 61'
RL	5	Lasha Jaiani
BF	6	Otar Giorgadze	(substituted off) 67'
OF	7	Sandro Mamamtavrishvili
N8	8	Tornike Jalagonia
SH	9	Gela Aprasidze
FH	10	Tedo Abzhandadze
LW	11	Mirian Modebadze	(yellow card) 48' to 58' (substituted off) 59'
IC	12	Merab Sharikadze (c)	59' to 67'
OC	13	Demur Tapladze
RW	14	Aka Tabutsadze
FB	15	Lasha Khmaladze
Replacements:
HK	16	Luka Nioradze	(substituted on) 46'
PR	17	Mikheil Nariashvili	(substituted on) 55'
PR	18	Luka Japaridze	(substituted on) 22' (substituted off) 68'
LK	19	Nodar Tcheishvili	(substituted on) 61'
FL	20	Nikoloz Aptsiauri	(substituted on) 67'
SH	21	Vasil Lobzhanidze
CE	22	Lasha Lomidze	(substituted on) 59' (substituted off) 67'
WG	23	Davit Meskhi	(substituted on) 59'
Coach:
Levan Maisashvili

LP	1	Francisco Fernandes	(substituted off) 52'
HK	2	Lionel Campergue	19' to 30' (substituted off) 40'
TP	3	Diogo Hasse Ferreira	(substituted off) 59' (substituted on) 67'
LL	4	José Madeira
RL	5	Jean Sousa	(substituted off) 64'
BF	6	João Granate	(substituted off) 61'
OF	7	Steevy Cerqueira	(substituted off) 61'
N8	8	Rafael Simões
SH	9	Samuel Marques
FH	10	Jerónimo Portela	(substituted off) 55'
LW	11	Rodrigo Marta	(substituted off) 59'
IC	12	Tomás Appleton (c)
OC	13	José Lima
RW	14	Vincent Pinto
FB	15	Manuel Cardoso Pinto
Replacements:
PR	16	Geoffrey Moïse	(substituted on) 52'
HK	17	Duarte Diniz	(substituted on) 19' (substituted off) 30' (substituted on) 40'
PR	18	João Mateus	(substituted on) 59' (substituted off) 67'
LK	19	Duarte Torgal	(substituted on) 64'
FL	20	David Wallis	(substituted on) 61'
N8	21	Thibault de Freitas	(substituted on) 61'
SH	22	Pedro Lucas	(substituted on) 55'
WG	23	Simão Bento	(substituted on) 59'
Coach:
Patrice Lagisquet

Touch judges:
Ludovic Cayre (France)
Stéphane Boyer (France)
Television match official:
Denis Grenouillet (France)

=== Week 2 ===
12 February 2022
13:00 MSK (UTC+03)

(1 LBP) Russia	37–41	Spain
Try: Gresev 30' c Ryabishchuk 33' c Davydov 61' c Zhivatov 76' c Con: Gaisin (4/4) 30', 34', 62', 77'; Pen: Gaisin (3/3) 9', 42', 66'	Report	Try: Gimeno 3' c Minguillon (2) 16' m, 36' m Pinto 40' m Ovejero 80' c Con: Ordas (2/5) 3', 80'; Pen: Ordas (4/4) 27', 59', 65', 71'

Slava Metreveli Central Stadium, Sochi
Attendance: 0
Referee: Andrea Piardi (Italy)

LP	1	Nikoloz Kazalikashvili	(substituted off) 60'
HK	2	Dmitry Parkhomenko	(substituted off) 49'
TP	3	Vladimir Podrezov	(substituted off) 49'
LL	4	Maxim Gargalîc	(substituted off) 60'
RL	5	Anton Makarenko	(yellow card) 40' to 50' (substituted off) 50'
BF	6	Victor Arhip
OF	7	Nikita Vavilin
N8	8	Victor Gresev (c)
SH	9	Efim Ryabishchuk	(substituted off) 60'
FH	10	Ramil Gaisin
LW	11	Vasily Artemyev	(substituted off) 65'
IC	12	German Davydov
OC	13	Daniil Potikhanov
RW	14	Andrei Karzanov
FB	15	Dmitry Sukhin
Replacements:
HK	16	Shamil Magomedov	(substituted on) 49' (yellow card) 80'
PR	17	Azamat Bitiev	(substituted on) 60'
PR	18	Nikoloz Narmania	(substituted on) 49'
LK	19	Nikita Bekov	(substituted on) 60'
FL	20	Vitaly Zhivatov	(substituted on) 50'
SH	21	Alexey Sherban	(substituted on) 60'
CE	22	Dmitry Gerasimov	(substituted on) 65'
WG	23	Daniil Potikhanov
Coach:
Dick Muir

LP	1	Fernando López (c)	(substituted off) 51'
HK	2	Marco Pinto	(substituted off) 62'
TP	3	Jon Zabala	(substituted off) 62' (substituted on) 74'
LL	4	Lucas Guillaume	(substituted off) 2'
RL	5	Manuel Mora
BF	6	Matthew Foulds	(substituted off) 41'
OF	7	Frédéric Quercy
N8	8	Facundo Domínguez
SH	9	Guillaume Rouet	(substituted off) 71'
FH	10	Manuel Ordas
LW	11	Gauthier Minguillon	(substituted off) 74'
IC	12	Álvar Gimeno	(substituted off) 29' (substituted on) 37'
OC	13	Fabien Perrin	(substituted off) 77'
RW	14	Jordi Jorba	(substituted off) 69'
FB	15	Charly Malié	(yellow card) 50' to 60'
Replacements:
PR	16	Thierry Futeu	(substituted on) 51'
HK	17	Santiago Ovejero	(substituted on) 62'
PR	18	Joel Merkler	(substituted on) 62' (yellow card) 73' to 80'
LK	19	Víctor Sánchez	(substituted on) 2'
FL	20	Gautier Gibouin	(substituted on) 41'
SH	21	Tomás Munilla	(substituted on) 71'
FH	22	Mathieu Bélie	(substituted on) 69'
CE	23	Bautista Güemes	(substituted on) 29' (substituted off) 37' (substituted on) 77'
Coach:
Santiago Santos

Touch judges:
Federico Vedovelli (Italy)
Filippo Bertelli (Italy)
Television match official:
Stefano Roscini (Italy)

12 February 2022
13:15 CET (UTC+01)

Netherlands	10–72	Georgia (1 TBP)
Try: Danen 49' c Con: Weersma (1/1) 50'; Pen: Weersma (1/1) 17'	Report	Try: Giorgadze (3) 8' m, 46' c, 59' c Tabutsadze (2) 14' m, 38' m Japaridze 24' c Lobzhanidze (2) 28' c, 53' c Jalagonia 52' c Modebadze 66' m Chkoidze (2) 76' m, 82' m Con: Abzhandadze (6/12) 25', 29', 47', 53', 54', 60'

NRCA Stadium, Amsterdam
Attendance: 900
Referee: Ludovic Cayre (France)

LP	1	Hugo Langelaan	(substituted off) 65'
HK	2	Mark Darlington	(substituted off) 54'
TP	3	Andrew Darlington	(substituted off) 43'
LL	4	Dennis van Dijken	(substituted off) 65'
RL	5	Jim Boelrijk	(substituted off) 54'
BF	6	Louis Bruinsma
OF	7	Spike Salman
N8	8	Dirk Danen (c)
SH	9	Caleb Korteweg	(substituted off) 54'
FH	10	David Weersma	(substituted off) 65'
LW	11	Daan van der Avoird	(substituted off) 54'
IC	12	Oliva Sialau
OC	13	Bart Wierenga
RW	14	Jordy Hop
FB	15	Te Hauora Campbell
Replacements:
HK	16	Ross Bennie-Coulson	(substituted on) 54'
PR	17	Robin Moenen	(substituted on) 65'
PR	18	Lodi Buijs	(substituted on) 43'
LK	19	Liam Stone	(substituted on) 54'
LK	20	Jade Plane	(substituted on) 65'
SH	21	Hugo Schöller	(substituted on) 54'
FH	22	Mees van Oord	(substituted on) 65'
WG	23	Jules Godfroy	(substituted on) 54'
Coach:
Zane Gardiner

LP	1	Mikheil Nariashvili	(substituted off) 51'
HK	2	Vano Karkadze	(substituted off) 61'
TP	3	Luka Japaridze	(substituted off) 51'
LL	4	Nodar Tcheishvili	(substituted off) 61'
RL	5	Lasha Jaiani
BF	6	Otar Giorgadze
OF	7	Giorgi Tsutskiridze	(substituted off) 68'
N8	8	Tornike Jalagonia
SH	9	Vasil Lobzhanidze	(substituted off) 61'
FH	10	Tedo Abzhandadze
LW	11	Davit Meskhi
IC	12	Merab Sharikadze (c)	(substituted off) 54'
OC	13	Demur Tapladze
RW	14	Aka Tabutsadze	(substituted off) 65'
FB	15	Lasha Khmaladze
Replacements:
HK	16	Giorgi Chkoidze	(substituted on) 610'
PR	17	Guram Gogichashvili	(substituted on) 51'
PR	18	Nikoloz Khatiashvili	(substituted on) 51'
LK	19	Giorgi Javakhia	(substituted on) 61'
FL	20	Sandro Mamamtavrishvili	(substituted on) 68'
SH	21	Gela Aprasidze	(substituted on) 61'
CE	22	Tornike Kakhoidze	(substituted on) 54'
WG	23	Mirian Modebadze	(substituted on) 65'
Coach:
Levan Maisashvili

Touch judges:
Cédric Marchat (France)
Stéphane Crapoix (France)
Television match official:
Patrick Pechambert (France)

12 February 2022
17:30 EET (UTC+02)

Romania	37–27	Portugal
Try: Ser 40' c Cojocaru 54' c Savin 67' c Gorin 80' c Con: Melinte (3/3) 41', 55', 67'; Plai (1/1) 80'; Pen: Melinte (3/3) 5', 36', 75'	Report	Try: Lima 24' m Marta 31' c Pinto (2) 37' c, 49' m Con: Marques (2/4) 33', 39'; Pen: Marques (1/1) 28'

Arcul de Triumf Stadium, Bucharest
Attendance: 2,700
Referee: Frank Murphy (Ireland)

LP	1	Vasile Bălan	(substituted off) 46'
HK	2	Ovidiu Cojocaru	(substituted off) 79'
TP	3	Alex Gordaș	(substituted off) 46'
LL	4	Marius Antonescu	(substituted off) 79'
RL	5	Adrian Moțoc
BF	6	Cristi Chirică	(substituted off) 46'
OF	7	Dragoș Ser
N8	8	Mihai Macovei (c)
SH	9	Gabriel Rupanu	(substituted off) 50'
FH	10	Daniel Plai
LW	11	Marius Simionescu
IC	12	Jason Tomane
OC	13	Hinckley Vaovasa
RW	14	Ionuț Dumitru	(substituted off) 79'
FB	15	Ionel Melinte
Replacements:
HK	16	Tudor Butnariu	(substituted on) 79'
PR	17	Alexandru Savin	(substituted on) 46'
PR	18	Alexandru Țăruș	(substituted on) 46'
LK	19	Marius Iftimiciuc	(substituted on) 79'
N8	20	André Gorin	(substituted on) 46'
SH	21	Florin Surugiu	(substituted on) 50'
CE	22	Vlăduț Popa
WG	23	Nicolas Onuțu	(substituted on) 79'
Coach:
Andy Robinson

LP	1	Francisco Fernandes	(substituted off) 51'
HK	2	Lionel Campergue	(substituted off) 22'
TP	3	Diogo Hasse Ferreira	(substituted off) 51' (substituted on) 75'
LL	4	José Madeira
RL	5	Rafael Simões
BF	6	João Granate	(substituted off) 68'
OF	7	Steevy Cerqueira
N8	8	Thibault de Freitas	(substituted off) 56'
SH	9	Samuel Marques	(yellow card) 52' to 62'
FH	10	Jorge Abecasis
LW	11	Rodrigo Marta
IC	12	Tomás Appleton (c)	(substituted off) 68'
OC	13	José Lima
RW	14	Vincent Pinto
FB	15	Manuel Cardoso Pinto	(substituted off) 77'
Replacements:
PR	16	Geoffrey Moïse	(substituted on) 51'
HK	17	Duarte Diniz	(substituted on) 22'
PR	18	Cody Thomas	(substituted on) 51' (substituted off) 75'
LK	19	Duarte Torgal	(substituted on) 56' (substituted off) 77'
FL	20	David Wallis	(substituted on) 68'
CE	21	Pedro Bettencourt	(substituted on) 68'
SH	22	Pedro Lucas	(substituted on) 77'
FB	23	Simão Bento	(substituted on) 77'
Coach:
Patrice Lagisquet

Touch judges:
Oisin Quinn (Ireland)
Nigel Correll (Ireland)
Television match official:
Leo Colgan (Ireland)

=== Week 3 ===
26 February 2022
15:00 WET (UTC+00)

(1 TBP) Portugal	59–3	Netherlands
Try: Belo 14' c Diniz 22' m Bettencourt (2) 30' c, 63' c Simões (2) 38' c, 43' m Marta 47' c Storti 54' c Antunes 76'; Con: Antunes (7/9) 15', 31', 39', 48', 55', 64', 77'	Report	Pen: Te Hauora Campbell (1/1) 1'

Campo de Rugby Complexo Desportivo, Caldas da Rainha
Attendance: 2,500
Referee: Federico Vedovelli (Italy)

LP	1	Francisco Fernandes	(substituted off) 59'
HK	2	Duarte Diniz	(substituted off) 45'
TP	3	Anthony Alvès	(substituted off) 52'
LL	4	José Madeira
RL	5	José Rebelo de Andrade	(substituted off) 65'
BF	6	Steevy Cerqueira
OF	7	David Wallis
N8	8	Rafael Simões	(substituted off) 57'
SH	9	João Belo	(substituted off) 61'
FH	10	Jerónimo Portela	(substituted off) 72'
LW	11	Rodrigo Marta
IC	12	Tomás Appleton (c)
OC	13	Pedro Bettencourt
RW	14	Dany Antunes
FB	15	Nuno Sousa Guedes	(substituted off) 41'
Replacements:
PR	16	David Costa	(substituted on) 59'
HK	17	Nuno Mascarenhas	(substituted on) 45'
PR	18	Diogo Hasse Ferreira	(substituted on) 52'
FL	19	João Granate	(substituted on) 65'
N8	20	Manuel Picão	(substituted on) 57'
SH	21	João Dias	(substituted on) 61'
CE	22	José Lima	(substituted on) 72'
WG	23	Raffaele Storti	(substituted on) 41'
Coach:
Patrice Lagisquet

LP	1	Hugo Langelaan	(substituted off) 65'
HK	2	Ross Bennie-Coulson	(substituted off) 56'
TP	3	Lodi Buijs	(substituted off) 65'
LL	4	Dennis van Dijken
RL	5	Jim Boelrijk	(substituted off) 50'
BF	6	Christopher Raymond
OF	7	Spike Salman
N8	8	Dave Koelman	(yellow card) 34' to 44' (substituted off) 44'
SH	9	Mark Coebergh	(substituted off) 50'
FH	10	Mees van Oord	(substituted off) 50'
LW	11	Daan van der Avoird	(substituted off) 68'
IC	12	Oliva Sialau
OC	13	Bart Wierenga (c)
RW	14	Jordy Hop
FB	15	Te Hauora Campbell
Replacements:
HK	16	Mike Mbaud	(substituted on) 56'
PR	17	Robin Moenen	(substituted on) 65'
PR	18	Gabor Besuijen	(substituted on) 65'
LK	19	Monty Leverstein	(substituted on) 50'
FL	20	Liam Stone	(substituted on) 44'
SH	21	Caleb Korteweg	(substituted on) 50'
CE	22	Storm Caroll	(substituted on) 50'
CE	23	Daily Limmen	(substituted on) 68'
Coach:
Zane Gardiner

Touch judges:
Riccardo Angelucci (Italy)
Simone Boaretto (Italy)
Television match official:
Alan Falzone (Italy)

27 February 2022
12:45 CET (UTC+01)

Spain	38–21	Romania
Try: Marco Pinto 6' c Foulds 10' c Quercy (2) 19' c, 59' c Gimeno 27' c Con: Ordas (5/5) 7', 11', 20', 27', 60'; Pen: Ordas (1/1) 55'	Report	Try: Hinckley Vaovasa (2) 16' c, 65' c Marius Simionescu 70' c Con: Plai (3/3) 17', 66', 71'

Estadio Nacional Complutense, Madrid
Attendance: 5,000
Referee: Sam Grove-White (Scotland)

LP	1	Fernando López (c)	(substituted off) 47'
HK	2	Marco Pinto	(substituted off) 44'
TP	3	Jon Zabala	(substituted off) 58'
LL	4	Lucas Guillaume
RL	5	Manuel Mora	(yellow card) 77' to 80'
BF	6	Matthew Foulds	(substituted off) 45'
OF	7	Frédéric Quercy
N8	8	Afaese Tauli	(yellow card) 14' to 24' (substituted off) 71'
SH	9	Guillaume Rouet	(substituted off) 62'
FH	10	Manuel Ordas	(substituted off) 66'
LW	11	Gauthier Minguillon
IC	12	Álvar Gimeno
OC	13	Fabien Perrin
RW	14	Jordi Jorba
FB	15	Charly Malié	(substituted off) 60'
Replacements:
PR	16	Thierry Futeu	(substituted on) 47'
HK	17	Santiago Ovejero	(substituted on) 44'
PR	18	Joel Merkler	(substituted on) 58'
LK	19	Víctor Sánchez	(substituted on) 71'
FL	20	Facundo Domínguez	(substituted on) 45'
SH	21	Tomás Munilla	(substituted on) 62'
FH	22	Mathieu Bélie	(substituted on) 60'
FB	23	Iñaki Mateu	(substituted on) 66'
Coach:
Santiago Santos

LP	1	Alexandru Savin	(substituted off) 53'
HK	2	Ovidiu Cojocaru	(substituted off) 53'
TP	3	Alexandru Țăruș	(substituted off) 55'
LL	4	Marius Antonescu	(substituted off) 50'
RL	5	Adrian Moțoc
BF	6	Mihai Macovei (c)
OF	7	Dragoș Ser
N8	8	André Gorin	(substituted off) 50'
SH	9	Florin Surugiu	(substituted off) 50'
FH	10	Daniel Plai
LW	11	Marius Simionescu
IC	12	Jason Tomane	(substituted off) 62'
OC	13	Hinckley Vaovasa
RW	14	Ionuț Dumitru
FB	15	Ionel Melinte	(substituted off) 55'
Replacements:
HK	16	Florin Bărdașu	(substituted on) 53'
PR	17	Vasile Bălan	(substituted on) 53'
PR	18	Costel Burțilă	(substituted on) 53'
LK	19	Florian Roșu	(substituted on) 50'
FL	20	Cristi Chirică	(substituted on) 50'
SH	21	Gabriel Rupanu	(substituted on) 50'
CE	22	Vlăduț Popa	(substituted on) 62'
WG	23	Nicolas Onuțu	(substituted on) 55'
Coach:
Andy Robinson

Touch judges:
Graeme Ormiston (Scotland)
Jonny Perriam (Scotland)
Television match official:
Neil Paterson (Scotland)

N/A
N/A

Georgia	Cancelled	Russia
	N/A

N/A
Attendance: N/A
Referee: N/A

- Georgia awarded 4 points.

=== Week 4 ===
N/A
N/A

Russia	Cancelled	Netherlands
	N/A

N/A
Attendance: N/A
Referee: N/A

- Netherlands awarded 4 points.

12 March 2022
17:30 EET (UTC+02)

(1 LBP) Romania	23–26	Georgia
Try: Cojocaru 7' m Bărdașu 73' c Con: Melinte (2/2) 39', 73'; Pen: Melinte (3/4) 17', 21', 43'	Rerport	Try: Lobzhanidze 9' c Sharikadze 28' c Todua 34' c Tabutsadze 70' m Con: Abzhandadze (3/4) 10', 28', 34'

Arcul de Triumf Stadium, Bucharest
Attendance: 6,000
Referee: Ben Breakspear (Wales)

LP	1	Andrei Ursache	(substituted off) 71'
HK	2	Ovidiu Cojocaru	(substituted off) 69'
TP	3	Vasile Bălan
LL	4	Marius Iftimiciuc
RL	5	Adrian Moțoc
BF	6	Cristi Chirică	(substituted off) 71'
OF	7	Dragoș Ser
N8	8	Mihai Macovei (c)	(substituted off) 69'
SH	9	Gabriel Rupanu	(substituted off) 51'
FH	10	Tudor Boldor	(substituted off) 46'
LW	11	Marius Simionescu	(substituted off) 63'
IC	12	Jason Tomane
OC	13	Nicolas Onuțu
RW	14	Ionuț Dumitru
FB	15	Ionel Melinte
Replacements:
HK	16	Florin Bărdașu	(substituted on) 69'
PR	17	Constantin Pristăvița	(substituted on) 71'
PR	18	Costel Burțilă
FL	19	Florian Roșu	(substituted on) 71'
N8	20	André Gorin	(substituted on) 69'
SH	21	Florin Surugiu	(substituted on) 51'
FH	22	Daniel Plai	(substituted on) 46'
CE	23	Vlăduț Popa	(substituted on) 63'
Coach:
Andy Robinson

LP	1	Mikheil Nariashvili	(substituted off) 40'
HK	2	Shalva Mamukashvili	(substituted off) 59'
TP	3	Beka Gigashvili	(substituted off) 56'
LL	4	Lasha Jaiani
RL	5	Konstantin Mikautadze	(substituted off) 48'
BF	6	Luka Ivanishvili
OF	7	Beka Saghinadze
N8	8	Tornike Jalagonia
SH	9	Vasil Lobzhanidze	(substituted off) 56'
FH	10	Tedo Abzhandadze
LW	11	Alexander Todua
IC	12	Merab Sharikadze (c)
OC	13	Giorgi Kveseladze
RW	14	Aka Tabutsadze	(yellow card) 5' to 15'
FB	15	Davit Niniashvili
Replacements:
HK	16	Jaba Bregvadze	(substituted on) 59'
PR	17	Guram Gogichashvili	(substituted on) 40'
PR	18	Nikoloz Khatiashvili	(substituted on) 56'
LK	19	Grigor Kerdikoshvili	(substituted on) 48'
FL	20	Sandro Mamamtavrishvili
SH	21	Gela Aprasidze	(substituted on) 56' (yellow card) 63' to 73'
FB	22	Lasha Khmaladze
CE	23	Demur Tapladze
Coach:
Levan Maisashvili

Touch judges:
Gareth Newman (Wales)
Mark Butcher (Wales)
Television match official:
Elgan Williams (Wales)

13 March 2022
12:45 CET (UTC+01)

Spain	33–28	Portugal (1 LBP)
Try: Zabala 7' m Quercy (2) 17' c, 25' c Pinto 38' m Con: Ordas (2/4) 18', 26'; Pen: Ordas (3/3) 44', 51', 58'	Report	Try: Bento 10' c Bettencourt 32' c Madeira 79' m Con: Marques (2/2) 11', 33'; Pen: Marques (3/3) 6', 46', 54'

Estadio Nacional Complutense, Madrid
Attendance: 6,000
Referee: Tual Trainini (France)

LP	1	Fernando López (c)	(substituted off) 44'
HK	2	Marco Pinto	(substituted off) 48' (substituted on) 77'
TP	3	Jon Zabala	(substituted off) 66'
LL	4	Lucas Guillaume
RL	5	Manuel Mora
BF	6	Matthew Foulds	(substituted off) 71'
OF	7	Frédéric Quercy
N8	8	Afaese Tauli	(substituted off) 62'
SH	9	Guillaume Rouet	(substituted off) 66'
FH	10	Manuel Ordas	(substituted off) 68'
LW	11	Gauthier Minguillon	(substituted off) 74'
IC	12	Álvar Gimeno
OC	13	Fabien Perrin	(substituted off) 76'
RW	14	Jordi Jorba
FB	15	Charly Malié	(yellow card) 79' to 80'
Replacements:
PR	16	Thierry Futeu	(substituted on) 44'
HK	17	Santiago Ovejero	(substituted on) 48' (substituted off) 77'
PR	18	Joel Merkler	(substituted on) 66'
LK	19	Víctor Sánchez	(substituted on) 71'
N8	20	Facundo Domínguez	(substituted on) 62'
SH	21	Tomás Munilla	(substituted on) 66'
FH	22	Bautista Güemes	(substituted on) 68'
CE	23	Alejandro Alonso	(substituted on) 76'
Coach:
Santiago Santos

LP	1	Francisco Fernandes	(substituted off) 59'
HK	2	Loic Bournonville	(substituted off) 50'
TP	3	Anthony Alves	(substituted off) 54'
LL	4	José Madeira
RL	5	Jean Sousa	(substituted off) 67'
BF	6	Steevy Cerqueira
OF	7	David Wallis	(substituted off) 50'
N8	8	Rafael Simões	(substituted off) 26' (substituted on) 36' (substituted off) 40' (substituted on) 67'
SH	9	Samuel Marques	(substituted off) 77'
FH	10	Jerónimo Portela
LW	11	Rodrigo Marta
IC	12	José Lima (c)
OC	13	Pedro Bettencourt
RW	14	Vincent Pinto	(substituted off) 63'
FB	15	Simão Bento	(substituted off) 58'
Replacements:
PR	16	David Costa	(substituted on) 59'
HK	17	Nuno Mascarenhas	(substituted on) 50'
PR	18	Diogo Hasse Ferreira	(substituted on) 54'
LK	19	José Maria de Andrade	(substituted on) 50'
N8	20	Thibault de Freitas	(substituted on) 26' (substituted off) 36' (substituted on) 40'
SH	21	João Belo	(substituted on) 77'
WG	22	Raffaele Storti	(substituted on) 63'
FB	23	Manuel Cardoso Pinto	(substituted on) 58'
Coach:
Patrice Lagisquet

Touch judges:
David Beun (France)
Christophe Bultet (France)
Television match official:
Eric Briquet-Campin (France)

=== Week 5 ===
19 March 2022
13:00 CET (UTC+01)

Netherlands	12–38	Romania (1 TBP)
Try: Weersma 34' m Raymond 40' c Con: Weersma (1/2) 40'	Report	Try: Rupanu 3' c Vaovasa 14' c Dumitru 17' c Cojocaru 28' m Bucur 71' m Macovei 77' c Con: Melinte (4/6) 3', 15', 17'm 77'

NRCA Stadium, Amsterdam
Attendance: 1,200
Referee: Ben Blain (Scotland)

Touch judges:
Ru Campbell (Scotland)
Bob Nevins (Scotland)
Television match official:
Andrew Mac Menemy (Scotland)

N/A
N/A

Portugal	Cancelled	Russia
	N/A

N/A
Attendance: N/A
Referee: N/A

- Portugal awarded 4 points.

20 March 2022
18:00 GET (UTC+04)

(1 TBP) Georgia	49–15	Spain
Try: Tabutsadze (2) 27' c, 68' c Giorgadze (2) 34' m, 73' c Sharikadze 62' c Chkoidze 80' c Con: Abzhandadze (5/6) 28', 63', 69', 74', 80'; Pen: Abzhandadze (2/3) 15', 54'; Drop: Lobzhanidze (1/1) 3'	Report	Try: Jorba 24' m Ovejero 49' c Con: Ordas (1/2) 51'; Pen: Ordas (1/2) 8'

Boris Paichadze Dinamo Arena, Tbilisi
Attendance: 11,000
Referee: Craig Evans (Wales)

Touch judges:
Ben Breakspear (Wales)
Ian Davies (Wales)
Television match official:
Jon Mason (Wales)

== International broadcasters ==
Country	Broadcaster	Summary
Georgia	Rugby TV; Imedi TV	Georgia games shown live via Rugby TV and Imedi TV. Also Georgia games are streamed and free on Rugby TV Facebook page
Netherlands	Ziggo	Selected games live on Ziggo Sport
Portugal	RTP	Portugal games shown live via RTP 2 and their VoD service RTP Play
Romania	TVR	Romania games shown live via TVR 1
Russia	Спортивный (Tricolor TV); Наш спорт 20	Russia games shown live via Спортивный (Tricolor TV) and available via streaming through their VoD service Наш спорт 20 (Russia only)
Spain	Teledeporte; RTVE.es	Spain games shown live via Teledeporte and available via streaming through their VoD service TVE Play
France	RugbyZone	All games available through streaming via RugbyZone
North America	FloSports	All games available through streaming via FloSports
Rest of the World	Rugby Europe	All games available through streaming via Rugby Europe (registration required). Some games are streamed and free on Rugby Europe Youtube channel

== See also ==
- Rugby Europe International Championships
- Antim Cup
- Kiseleff Cup
