= 2023 Rugby World Cup – Europe qualification =

Tournament details
- Dates: 6 March 2021 – 20 March 2022
- No. of nations: 6

Tournament statistics
- Matches played: 27

The European qualification tournament for the 2023 Rugby World Cup was contested between March 2021 and March 2022. Six teams not already qualified via their performance at the 2019 Rugby World Cup competed for two direct qualification spots in the final tournament and for a place in the Final Qualification Tournament.

== Format ==
The Rugby Europe Championship, controlled by Rugby Europe, is the regional qualification tournament for the 2023 Rugby World Cup in France. Each team play each other in a double-round-robin tournament over the two years, with the winners and runners-up of the two-year cycle qualifying for the World Cup as Europe 1 and Europe 2 respectively. The third placed team advances to the Final qualification tournament as Europe 3.

The qualification process did not include the remaining three divisions in the Rugby Europe system that are typically included across play-off matches due to the time scale restraints caused by the COVID-19 pandemic.

== Entrants ==
Six teams competed during the European qualifiers for the 2023 Rugby World Cup; teams World Rankings are prior to the first European qualification matches on 6 March.

Nation	Rank	Began play	Qualifying status
England	4	N/A	Qualified with Top 12 finish at 2019 World Cup
France	3	N/A	Qualified as Hosts
Georgia	12	6 March 2021	Qualified as Europe 1 on 10 March 2022
Ireland	7	N/A	Qualified with Top 12 finish at 2019 World Cup
Italy	15	N/A	Qualified with Top 12 finish at 2019 World Cup
Netherlands	25	26 June 2021	Eliminated by Spain on 5 February 2022
Portugal	20	6 March 2021	Advances to Final Qualification Tournament as Europe 3 via points deduction on 27 June 2022
Romania	19	6 March 2021	Qualified as Europe 2 via points deduction on 27 June 2022
Russia	21	6 March 2021	Disqualified from competition on 28 February 2022
Scotland	8	N/A	Qualified with Top 12 finish at 2019 World Cup
Spain	17	14 March 2021	Eliminated via points deduction on 27 June 2022
Wales	5	N/A	Qualified with Top 12 finish at 2019 World Cup

== Rugby Europe Championship ==
=== Table ===
For the Rugby Europe Championship teams, results were considered on a 2-year aggregate from the 2021 and 2022 seasons; the winner and runner-up teams automatically qualified for the tournament as Europe 1 and Europe 2 individually, leaving the team in third place to qualify for the Final qualification tournament as Europe 3.

Following the Russian military invasion of Ukraine, Rugby Europe suspended all Russian games on home soil on 25 February 2022 before later suspending Russia at all levels with immediate effect on 1 March 2022. This later resulted in the cancelled games being declared a walkover and the opposition of Russia would be given 4 points.

Georgia were confirmed as Europe 1 following a walkover result against Russia whilst on 13 March, Spain had secured Europe 2 with a win over Portugal. However, on 28 March, it was announced Spain would be investigated for fielding an ineligible player, the South Africa-born Gavin Van Den Berg, in two World Cup qualifying matches against the Netherlands. On 28 April 2022, an independent judicial committee determined that Spain did breach the regulation, and deducted 10 points from the table. This resulted in Spain dropping out of the top three qualifying/play-off places meaning Romania qualified as Europe 2 and Portugal would proceed to the play-offs. Spain later appealed the decision, but the appeal was unsuccessful and the original decision was upheld. This meant Romania qualified as Europe 2 and Portugal advanced to the play-offs as Europe 3.

Qualified as Europe 1
Qualified as Europe 2
Advances to Final Qualification Tournament as Europe 3
Disqualified

Pos.	Team	Games				Points			Tries			TBP	LBP	GS	Table points
Pos.	Team	Played	Won	Drawn	Lost	For	Against	Diff	For	Against	Diff	TBP	LBP	GS	Table points
1	Georgia	10	9	1	0	325	146	+179	47	14	+33	5	0	1	44^{[a]}
2	Romania	10	6	0	4	289	232	+57	35	27	+8	2	2	0	28
3	Portugal	10	5	1	4	335	237	+98	44	31	+13	2	2	0	26^{[a]}
4	Spain	10	6	0	4	334	244	+90	44	30	+14	3	2	0	19*
5	Russia	10	2	0	8	159	217	−58	18	27	−9	1	1	0	10
6	Netherlands	10	1	0	9	98	464	−366	13	72	−59	0	0	0	4^{[a]}
Source - Points were awarded to the teams as follows: Win – 4 points | Draw – 2 points | At least 3 more tries than opponent – 1 point | Loss within 7 points – 1 point | Completing a Grand Slam – 1 point^{a} Georgia, Portugal and Netherlands awarded 4 points for cancelled games against Russia * deducted points

=== Fixtures ===
==== 2021 ====
6 March 2021
15:00 MSK (UTC+03)

Russia	18–13	Romania (1 BP)
Pen: Gaisin (6/7) 2', 24', 45', 57', 64', 72'	Report; WR Report	Try: Antonescu 7' c Con: Vlaicu (1/1) 8'; Pen: Vlaicu (2/2) 21', 76'

Fisht Olympic Stadium, Sochi
Attendance: 2,895
Referee: Shota Tevzadze (Georgia)

6 March 2021
15:00 WET (UTC+00)

Portugal	16–29	Georgia (1 BP)
Try: Marta 39' c Con: Marques (1/1) 40'; Pen: Marques (3/3) 5', 14', 44'	Report; WR Report	Try: Modebadze 18' m Bregvadze 29' m Melikidze 50' c Kharaishvili 66' m Jalaghonia 80+5' c Con: Matiashvili (2/5) 51', 80+6'

Estádio de Rugby Jamor, Lisbon
Attendance: 0
Referee: Gianluca Gnecchi (Italy)

13 March 2021
13:00 WET (UTC+00)

(1 BP) Portugal	27–28	Romania
Try: Antunes 10' c Portela 34' c Storti 66' c Con: Marques (3/3) 11', 35', 67'; Pen: Marques (2/2) 17', 60'	Report; WR Report	Try: Savin 49' m Onuțu 74' c Cojocaru 79' c Con: Melinte (2/2) 75', 80'; Pen: Vlaicu (3/4) 4', 21', 29'

Estádio de Rugby Jamor, Lisbon
Attendance: 30
Referee: Luc Ramos (France)

14 March 2021
12:45 CET (UTC+01)

(1 BP) Spain	19–25	Georgia
Try: Linklater 4' c Con: Güemes (1/1) 4'; Pen: Güemes (2/2) 40', 47'; Linklater (2/2) 64', 69'	Report; WR Report	Try: Jalaghonia 3' c Tabutsadze 48' m Bregvadze 67' c Con: Abzhandadze (2/3) 3', 68'; Pen: Abzhandadze (2/2) 14', 61'

Estadio Nacional Complutense, Madrid
Attendance: 0
Referee: Pierre Brousset (France)

20 March 2021
13:00 KALT (UTC+02)

Russia	6–23	Georgia (1 BP)
Pen: Gaisin (2/3) 38', 48'	Report; WR Report	Try: Tabutsadze 29' m Abzhandadze 39' m Niniashvili 60' c Con: Abzhandadze (1/3) 61'; Pen: Abzhandadze (2/4) 3', 21'

Kaliningrad Stadium, Kaliningrad
Attendance: 9,564
Referee: Andrea Piardi (Italy)

20 March 2021
15:00 EET (UTC+02)

Romania	22–16	Spain (1 BP)
Try: Căpățână 60' m Melinte 79' m Pen: Vlaicu (4/4) 25', 40', 47', 52'	Report; WR Report	Try: Rouet 42' c Con: Ordas (1/1) 43'; Pen: Ordas (3/3) 8', 34', 77'

Stadionul Steaua II, Bucharest
Attendance: 50
Referee: Nika Amashukeli (Georgia)

27 March 2021
16:00 WET (UTC+00)

Portugal	43–28	Spain
Try: Simões 28' c Portela 39' c Marta 47' c Storti 59' c Marques 77' c Fernandes 80' m Con: Marques (5/6) 29', 40', 48', 59', 79; Pen: Marques (1/2) 71'	Report; WR Report	Try: Pinto Ferrer 6' c Rouet 16' c Linklater 36' c Ordas 80' c Con: Ordas (4/4) 7', 17', 37', 80'

Estádio de Rugby Jamor, Lisbon
Attendance: 0
Referee: Ludovic Cayre (France)

28 March 2021
15:00 GET (UTC+04)

Georgia	28–17	Romania
Try: Penalty try 10'; Gigashvili 51'; Tabutsadze 70'; Con: Abzhandadze 52'; Pen: Abzhandadze 20', 40'; Drop: Babunashvili 80'	Report; WR Report	Try: Gorin 21'; Căpățână 61'; Con: Plai 22'; Vlaicu 62'; Pen: Vlaicu 44'

Mikheil Meskhi Stadium, Tbilisi
Attendance: 8,000
Referee: Paulo Duarte (Portugal)

26 June 2021
17:00 GET (UTC+04)

(1 BP) Georgia	48–15	Netherlands
Try: Niniashvili (3) 10' m, 72' c, 79' m Tabutsadze (2) 25' m, 65' c Lobzhanidze 37' m Gogichashvili 54' c Javakhia 60' c Con: Abzhandadze (1/4) 55'; Babunashvili (3/4) 61', 66', 73'	Report; WR Report	Try: Hop 35' m v. Dijk 75' c Con: Wierenga (1/2) 76'; Pen: Rademaker (1/3) 16'

Caucasus Arena, Telavi
Attendance: 700
Referee: Alexandru Ionescu (Romania)

10 July 2021
15:00 CEST (UTC+02)

Netherlands	28–61	Portugal (1 BP)
Try: Wierenga 37' c Campbell (2) 54' c, 84' c Hop 65' c Con: Weersma (4/4) 38', 54', 66', 85'	Report; WR Report	Try: Tadjer 2' c Storti (5) 12' c, 14' c, 60' c, 75' c, 80' m Marta (3) 37' m, 50' c, 67' c Con: Marques (8/9) 9', 13', 15', 40', 51', 61', 68', 76'

NRCA Stadium, Amsterdam
Attendance: 1,600
Referee: Aled Evans (Wales)

17 July 2021
13:30 MSK (UTC+03)

Russia	26–49	Portugal
Try: Gresev 29' c Silenko (2) 38' c, 59' m Sychev 77' c Con: Kushnarev (3/4) 30', 39', 77'	Report; WR Report	Try: Appleton 7' c Granate 15' c Lima 45' c Simões 56' m Penalty try 61'; Portela 67' c Con: Marques (4/5) 8', 16', 46', 68'; Pen: Marques (3/3) 3', 32', 50'

Nizhny Novgorod Stadium, Nizhny Novgorod
Attendance: 5,500
Referee: Ben Blain (Scotland)

6 November 2021
15:00 CET (UTC+01)

Netherlands	8–35	Russia (1 BP)
Try: van der Avoird 58' c Pen: Weersma (1/1) 42'	Report; WR Report	Try: Zhivatov 8' c Brocas 28' c Karzanov 43' c Morozov 51' c Ivanov 54' c Con: Gaisin (5/5) 9', 29', 44', 52', 55'

NRCA Stadium, Amsterdam
Attendance: 2,000
Referee: Keith Allen (Scotland)

13 November 2021
17:30 EET (UTC+02)

(1 BP) Romania	56–15	Netherlands
Try: Simionescu 10' c Dumitru (3) 19' c, 48' c, 56' c Cojocaru (2) 29' c, 43' c Vaovasa 31' c Bărdașu 80' c Con: Melinte (8/8) 11', 20', 30', 32', 44', 49', 57', 80'	Report; WR Report	Try: Bloemen 25' c van de Avoird 71' m Con: van Oord (1/1) 26'; Pen: van Oord (1/1) 35'

Stadionul Arcul de Triumf, Bucharest
Attendance: 0
Referee: Peter Martin (Ireland)

14 November 2021
12:45 CET (UTC+01)

(1 BP) Spain	49–12	Russia
Try: Pinto Ferrer 7' c Gimeno 23' c Mora (2) 35' c, 44' c Perrin 62' c Losada 67' c Aboitiz 73' c Con: Güemes (4/4) 7', 23', 36', 45'; Ordas (3/3) 63', 68', 73'	Report; WR Report	Try: Uzonov 47' m Kononov 65' c Con: Golov (1/1) 65'

Estadio Nacional Complutense, Madrid
Attendance: 5,000
Referee: Ben Breakspear (Wales)

18 December 2021
14:00 CET (UTC+01)

Netherlands	7–52	Spain (1 BP)
Try: van der Avoird 4' c Con: Mistou (1/1) 5'	Report; WR Report	Try: Gimeno 17' c Rouet 21' c Bell (2) 31' c, 56' m Pinto 54' c Van der Berg 64' c Minguillon 71' m Jorba 78' c Con: Rouet (5/6) 17', 21', 32', 55', 65'; Munilla (1/1) 79'

NRCA Stadium, Amsterdam
Attendance: 0
Referee: Eoghan Cross (Ireland)

==== 2022 ====
5 February 2022
14:30 EET (UTC+02)

Romania	34–25	Russia
Try: Cojocaru (2) 11' c, 25' c Macovei 40' c Rupanu 72' c Con: Boldor (3/3) 11', 25', 40'; Plai 72'; Pen: Boldor (1/2) 38'; Plai (1/1) 72'	Report; WR Report	Try: Penalty try 6'; Parkhomenko (2) 62' c, 75' m Con: Gaisin (1/2) 62'; Pen: Gaisin (2/3) 43', 47'

Stadionul Arcul de Triumf, Bucharest
Attendance: 2,700
Referee: Adam Leal (England)

5 February 2022
16:00 CET (UTC+01)

(1 BP) Spain	43–0	Netherlands
Try: Usárraga 10' c López 23' c Jorba 38' m Gimeno 44' c Ordas 56' m Minguillon 65' m Ovejero 71' c Con: Ordas (3/6) 11', 24', 45'; Bélie (1/1) 72'	Report; WR Report

Estadio Nacional Complutense, Madrid
Attendance: 2,000
Referee: Gianluca Gnecchi (Italy)

6 February 2022
15:00 GET (UTC+04)

Georgia	25–25	Portugal
Try: Tabutsadze 29' c Kerdikoshvili 40' m Jalaghonia 64' c Con: Abzhandadze (2/3) 30', 64'; Pen: Abzhandadze (2/2) 26', 46'	Report; WR Report	Try: Cardoso Pinto 36' m Marta 50' c Lima 58' c Con: Marques (2/3) 52', 59'; Pen: Marques (2/2) 10', 28'

Mikheil Meskhi Stadium, Tbilisi
Attendance: 7,000
Referee: Romain Poite (France)

12 February 2022
13:00 MSK (UTC+03)

(1 BP) Russia	37–41	Spain
Try: Gresev 30' c Ryabishchuk 33' c Davydov 61' c Zhivatov 76' c Con: Gaisin (4/4) 30', 34', 62', 77'; Pen: Gaisin (3/3) 9', 42', 66'	Report; WR Report	Try: Gimeno 3' c Minguillon (2) 16' m, 36' m Pinto 40' m Ovejero 80' c Con: Ordas (2/5) 3', 80'; Pen: Ordas (4/4) 27', 59', 65', 71'

Slava Metreveli Central Stadium, Sochi
Attendance: 0
Referee: Andrea Piardi (Italy)

12 February 2022
13:15 CET (UTC+01)

Netherlands	10–72	Georgia (1 BP)
Try: Danen 49' c Con: Weersma (1/1) 50'; Pen: Weersma (1/1) 17'	Report; WR Report	Try: Giorgadze (3) 8' m, 46' c, 59' c Tabutsadze (2) 14' m, 38' m Japaridze 24' c Lobzhanidze (2) 28' c, 53' c Jalaghonia 52' c Modebadze 66' m Chkoidze (2) 76' m, 82' m Con: Abzhandadze (6/12) 25', 29', 47', 53', 54', 60'

NRCA Stadium, Amsterdam
Attendance: 900
Referee: Ludovic Cayre (France)

12 February 2022
17:30 EET (UTC+02)

Romania	37–27	Portugal
Try: Ser 40' c Cojocaru 54' c Savin 67' c Gorin 80' c Con: Melinte (3/3) 41', 55', 67'; Plai (1/1) 80'; Pen: Melinte (3/3) 5', 36', 75'	Report; WR Report	Try: Lima 24' m Marta 31' c Pinto (2) 37' c, 49' m Con: Marques (2/4) 33', 39'; Pen: Marques (1/1) 28'

Stadionul Arcul de Triumf, Bucharest
Attendance: 2,700
Referee: Frank Murphy (Ireland)

26 February 2022
15:00 WET (UTC+00)

(1 BP) Portugal	59–3	Netherlands
Try: Belo 14' c Diniz 22' m Bettencourt (2) 30' c, 63' c Simões (2) 38' c, 43' m Marta 47' c Storti 54' c Antunes 76'; Con: Antunes (7/9) 15', 31', 39', 48', 55', 64', 77'	Report; WR Report	Pen: Te Hauora Campbell (1/1) 1'

Campo de Rugby Complexo Desportivo, Caldas da Rainha
Attendance: 2,500
Referee: Federico Vedovelli (Italy)

27 February 2022
12:45 CET (UTC+01)

Spain	38–21	Romania
Try: Marco Pinto 6' c Foulds 10' c Quercy (2) 19' c, 59' c Gimeno 27' c Con: Ordas (5/5) 7', 11', 20', 27', 60'; Pen: Ordas (1/1) 55'	Report; WR Report	Try: Hinckley Vaovasa (2) 16' c, 65' c Marius Simionescu 70' c Con: Plai (3/3) 17', 66', 71'

Estadio Nacional Complutense, Madrid
Attendance: 5,000
Referee: Sam Grove-White (Scotland)

N/A
N/A

Georgia	Cancelled	Russia
	WR Report

N/A
Attendance: N/A
Referee: N/A

- Georgia awarded 4 points.

N/A
N/A

Russia	Cancelled	Netherlands
	WR Report

N/A
Attendance: N/A
Referee: N/A

- Netherlands awarded 4 points.

12 March 2022
17:30 EET (UTC+02)

(1 BP) Romania	23–26	Georgia
Try: Cojocaru 7' m Bărdașu 73' c Con: Melinte (2/2) 39', 73'; Pen: Melinte (3/4) 17', 21', 43'	Rerport; WR Report	Try: Lobzhanidze 9' c Sharikadze 28' c Todua 34' c Tabutsadze 70' m Con: Abzhandadze (3/4) 10', 28', 34'

Stadionul Arcul de Triumf, Bucharest
Attendance: 6,000
Referee: Ben Breakspear (Wales)

13 March 2022
12:45 CET (UTC+01)

Spain	33–28	Portugal (1 BP)
Try: Zabala 7' m Quercy (2) 17' c, 25' c Pinto 38' m Con: Ordas (2/4) 18', 26'; Pen: Ordas (3/3) 44', 51', 58'	Report; WR Report	Try: Bento 10' c Bettencourt 32' c Madeira 79' m Con: Marques (2/2) 11', 33'; Pen: Marques (3/3) 6', 46', 54'

Estadio Nacional Complutense, Madrid
Attendance: 6,000
Referee: Tual Trainini (France)

19 March 2022
13:00 CET (UTC+01)

Netherlands	12–38	Romania (1 BP)
Try: Weersma 34' m Raymond 40' c Con: Weersma (1/2) 40'	Report; WR Report	Try: Rupanu 3' c Vaovasa 14' c Dumitru 17' c Cojocaru 28' m Bucur 71' m Macovei 77' c Con: Melinte (4/6) 3', 15', 17'm 77'

NRCA Stadium, Amsterdam
Attendance: 1,200
Referee: Ben Blain (Scotland)

N/A
N/A

Portugal	Cancelled	Russia
	WR Report

N/A
Attendance: N/A
Referee: N/A

Portugal awarded 4 points.

20 March 2022
18:00 GET (UTC+04)

(1 BP) Georgia	49–15	Spain
Try: Tabutsadze (2) 27' c, 68' c Giorgadze (2) 34' m, 73' c Sharikadze 62' c Chkoidze 80' c Con: Abzhandadze (5/6) 28', 63', 69', 74', 80'; Pen: Abzhandadze (2/3) 15', 54'; Drop: Lobzhanidze (1/1) 3'	Report; WR Report	Try: Jorba 24' m Ovejero 49' c Con: Ordas (1/2) 51'; Pen: Ordas (1/2) 8'

Boris Paichadze Dinamo Arena, Tbilisi
Attendance: 11,000
Referee: Craig Evans (Wales)

== See also ==
- 2021 Rugby Europe Championship
- 2022 Rugby Europe Championship
