= 2023 Rugby Europe Championship =

Rugby union competition

- Date: 4 February – 19 March 2023
- Countries: Belgium; Georgia; Germany; Netherlands; Poland; Portugal; Romania; Spain

Tournament statistics
- Champions: Georgia (15th title)
- Antim Cup: Georgia (16th title)
- Matches played: 20
- Attendance: 60,619 (3,031 per match)
- Tries scored: 149 (7.45 per match)
- Top point scorer(s): (Netherlands) David Weersma (52 points)
- Top try scorer(s): (Georgia (country)) Aka Tabutsadze (8 tries)
- Player of the tournament: (Portugal) Nuno Sousa Guedes

The 2023 Rugby Europe Championship was the seventh Rugby Europe Championship, the annual rugby union for the top European national teams outside the Six Nations Championship, and the 53rd edition of the competition (including all its previous incarnations as the FIRA Tournament, Rugby Union European Cup, FIRA Nations Cup, FIRA Trophy and European Nations Cup).

Eight teams took part in the 2023 Championship, up from six in previous tournaments, due to a reorganisation of the various flights of European international competition. The Championship was contested by Belgium, Georgia, Germany, Poland, the Netherlands, Portugal, Romania and Spain.

Russia, who competed in the 2022 Championship were relegated as a result of suspension due to their country's 2022 Russian invasion of Ukraine. The remaining five teams (Georgia, the Netherlands, Portugal, Romania, and Spain) were joined by the top three teams from the 2021–22 Rugby Europe Trophy, which Belgium won.

Georgia entered the tournament as defending champions. They topped the table in the 2022 tournament, claiming their 14th title. The serpentine system was applied to allocate each team to their respective groups. Each team played a total of five games (three round robin group matches to determine the team's path and two play-off matches). Seeding (for a group) and relegation are calculated over a two-year cycle, as is the promotion from the Trophy competition.

== Participants ==
Nation	Stadium			Head coach	Captain
Nation	Home stadium	Capacity	Location	Head coach	Captain
Belgium	Stade Nelson Mandela	2,100	Brussels	(England) Mike Ford	Jens Torfs
Georgia	Avchala Stadium	3,500	Tbilisi	(Georgia (country)) Levan Maisashvili	Merab Sharikadze
Germany	Fritz-Grunebaum-Sportpark	5,000	Heidelberg	(Germany) Mark Kuhlmann	Jörn Schröder
Netherlands	NRCA Stadium	7,000	Amsterdam	(Wales) Lyn Jones	Hugo Langelaan
Poland	Narodowy Stadion Rugby	2,425	Gdynia	(Wales) Christian Hitt	Piotr Zeszutek
Portugal	Estádio Nacional; Estádio do Restelo	37,593; 19,856	Oeiras; Lisbon	(France) Patrice Lagisquet	Tomás Appleton
Romania	Arcul de Triumf Stadium	8,207	Bucharest	(Romania) Eugen Apjok	Mihai Macovei
Spain	Estadio El Malecón; Estadio Nacional Complutense; Estadio Nuevo Vivero	6,007; 12,400; 14,898	Torrelavega; Madrid; Badajoz	(Spain) Santiago Santos	Jon Zabala

== Tables and Fixtures ==
=== Pool A ===
Advances to the Grand Finals Semi-Finals
Advances to the Ranking Finals Semi-Finals

Pos.	Team	Games				Points			Tries			TBP	LBP	Table points
Pos.	Team	Played	Won	Drawn	Lost	For	Against	Diff	For	Against	Diff	TBP	LBP	Table points
1	Georgia	3	3	0	0	156	23	+133	24	3	+21	3	0	15
2	Spain	3	2	0	1	63	75	-12	8	10	-2	1	0	9
3	Netherlands	3	1	0	2	61	97	-36	6	12	-6	0	0	4
4	Germany	3	0	0	3	55	140	-85	6	19	-13	0	1	1
Source - Points were awarded to the teams as follows: Win – 4 points | Draw – 2 points | At least 3 more tries than opponent – 1 point | Loss within 7 points – 1 point

==== Week 1 ====
5 February 2023
13:00 GET (UTC+4)

(1 TBP) Georgia	75–12	Germany
Try: Lashkhi 4' c Tabutsadze (3) 9' c, 23' c, 32' c Mikautadze 36' c Jalaghonia 40' c Tsutskiridze (3) 53' c, 71' m, 80' c Alania 58' c Matkava 67' c Con: Matkava (10/11) 5', 10', 24', 33', 37', 40+1', 54', 59', 68', 80'	Report	Try: Lammers 48' m Stella 63' c Con: Stella (1/2) 64'

Achvala Stadium, Tbilisi
Attendance: 2,960
Referee: Cristian Şerban (Romania)

5 February 2023
12:45 CET (UTC+1)

Spain	28–20	Netherlands
Try: Ferrer 4' c Ramiro 40' c Foulds 44' m Con: Vinuesa (2/3) 23', 41'; Pen: Vinuesa (3/3) 13', 32', 61'	Report	Try: Van Dijk 50' c Raymond 76' c Con: Weersma (2/2) 51', 77'; Pen: Fortuin (1/1) 13'; Weersma (1/1) 27'

Estadio Nacional Complutense, Madrid
Attendance: 4,500
Referee: Paulo Duarte (Portugal)

==== Week 2 ====
11 February 2023
13:15 CET (UTC+1)

Netherlands	8–40	Georgia (1 TBP)
Try: Bloemen 62' m Pen: Weersma (1/1) 14'	Report	Try: Niniashvili 10' c Chachanidze 19' m Chkoidze (2) 44' c, 52' c Gachechiladze (2) 67' c, 75' c Con: Abzhandadze (3/4) 11', 44', 53'; Matkava (2/2) 68', 76

NRCA Stadium, Amsterdam
Attendance: 2,500
Referee: Ludovic Cayre (France)

12 February 2023
14:30 CET (UTC+1)

Germany	14–32	Spain (1 TBP)
Try: Paine 24' m Con: Stella (0/1); Pen: Stella (3/3) 20', 40', 65'	Report	Try: Bell 8' c, 12' c del Hoyo 22' m Polkowska 67' m Iriberri 80' m Con: Guemes (2/5) 8', 12'; Pen: Guemes (1/1) 59'

Fritz-Grunebaum-Sportpark, Heidelberg
Attendance: 2,500
Referee: Clara Munarini (Italy)

==== Week 3 ====
18 February 2023
13:15 CET (UTC+1)

(1 LBP) Germany	29–33	Netherlands
Try: Lammers 18' m Paine 34' c Wolf 52' m Con: Stella (1/3) 35'; Pen: Stella (4/4) 24', 60', 68', 70'	Report	Try: Weersma 11' c van Dijk 27' c Penalty try 48'; Con: Weersma (2/2) 12', 28'; Pen: Weersma (4/4) 3', 7', 32', 40'; Fortuin (0/1)

Stadion Pichterich, Neckarsulm
Attendance: 1,350
Referee: Alexandru Ionescu (Romania)

18 February 2023
19:00 CET (UTC+1)

Spain	3–41	Georgia (1 TBP)
Pen: Vinuesa (1/1) 7'	Report	Try: Tabutsadze (2) 4' m, 8' m Gigashvili 25' m Abzhandadze 38' c Sharikadze 48' c Todua 65' m Niniashvili 68' c Con: Abzhandadze (2/5) 39', 49'; Matkava (1/2) 69'

Estadio El Malecón, Torrelavega
Attendance: 4,500
Referee: Eoghan Cross (Ireland)

=== Pool B ===
Advances to the Grand Finals Semi-Finals
Advances to the Ranking Finals Semi-Finals

Pos.	Team	Games				Points			Tries			TBP	LBP	Table points
Pos.	Team	Played	Won	Drawn	Lost	For	Against	Diff	For	Against	Diff	TBP	LBP	Table points
1	Portugal	3	3	0	0	157	40	+117	24	4	+20	3	0	15
2	Romania	3	2	0	1	143	70	+73	21	9	+12	2	0	10
3	Poland	3	1	0	2	51	147	-96	5	24	-19	0	0	4
4	Belgium	3	0	0	3	37	131	-94	5	18	-13	0	1	1
Source - Points were awarded to the teams as follows: Win – 4 points | Draw – 2 points | At least 3 more tries than opponent – 1 point | Loss within 7 points – 1 point

==== Week 1 ====
4 February 2023
14:00 EET (UTC+2)

(1 TBP) Romania	67–27	Poland
Try: Simionescu 1' m Chirică (2) 5' c, 17' c Butnariu 14' m Gajion 27' c Gontineac (2) 32' c, 53' c Vaovasa 42' c Macovei 45' m Irimescu 63' m Penalty try 71' m Con: Septar (1/2) 54'; Popoaia (5/7) 6', 18', 28', 33', 44'; Melinte (0/2)	Report	Try: Hudson-Kowalewicz 20' c Fidler 52' c Pozniak 78' c Con: Banaszek (2/2) 21', 53'; Piotrowicz (1/1) 79'; Pen: Banaszek (2/2) 39', 61'

Arcul de Triumf Stadium, Bucharest
Attendance: 2,136
Referee: Saba Abulashvili (Georgia)

4 February 2023
19:00 WET (UTC+0)

(1 TBP) Portugal	54–17	Belgium
Try: V. Pinto 5' c Marta 10' c Martins 15' c Lima 20' m Belo 45' c Sousa Guedes 48' c Lucas 60' c Campergue 62' c Con: Sousa Guedes (7/8) 6', 11', 21', 46', 49', 61', 63'	Report	Try: Cornez 37' c Pazgrat 69' c Con: Remue (2/2) 38', 70'; Pen: Remue (1/1) 31'

Estádio Nacional, Oeiras
Attendance: 3,723
Referee: Hollie Davidson (Scotland)

==== Week 2 ====
11 February 2023
11:45 CET (UTC+1)

Poland	3–65	Portugal (1 TBP)
Pen: Piotrowicz (1/1) 10'	Report	Try: Marques 2' c Marta (4) 13' m, 41' m, 46' c, 80' c Pinto (3) 19' c, 67' m, 71' m Portela 29' m Tadjer 39' m Lima 48' c Con: Marques (4/4) 2', 19', 47', 48'; Portela (1/1) 80'

Narodowy Stadion Rugby, Gdynia
Attendance: 2,000
Referee: Andrew Cole (Ireland)

11 February 2023
18:30 CET (UTC+1)

Belgium	5–56	Romania (1 TBP)
Try: Godsmark 37' m	Report	Try: Penalty try 7'; Gontineac (3) 13' c, 43' c, 47' c Savin 33' c Cojocaru 55' c Chirică 61' c Tomane 80' c Con: Melinte (7/7) 15', 34', 44', 47', 56', 63', 80'

Stade Nelson Mandela, Brussels
Attendance: 2,100
Referee: Mike English (Wales)

==== Week 3 ====
18 February 2023
21:15 CET (UTC+1)

Poland	21–15	Belgium (1 LBP)
Try: Szwagrzak 9' m Zeszutek 49' c Con: Piotrowicz (1/2) 50'; Pen: Piotrowicz (3/3) 4', 58', 79'	Report	Try: Cornez 74' m Andre 80' c Con: Remue (1/2) 80'; Pen: Williams (1/1) 12'

Narodowy Stadion, Gdynia
Attendance: 2,000
Referee: Inigo Atorrasagasti (Spain)

19 February 2023
15:00 WET (UTC+0)

(1 TBP) Portugal	38–20	Romania
Try: Bettencourt (2) 5' c, 12' c Madeira 51' c Lucas 59' c Diniz 79' c Con: Sousa Guedes (5/5) 6', 13', 52', 59', 80'; Pen: Sousa Guedes (1/1) 15'	Report	Try: Gontineac 1' c Chirică 64' c Con: Popoaia (1/1) 2'; Melinte (1/1) 64'; Pen: Popoaia (2/2) 9', 45'

Estádio do Restelo, Lisbon
Attendance: 4,250
Referee: Nika Amashukeli (Georgia)

== Ranking finals ==
Semi-finals
4 March – NRCA Stadium, Amsterdam
Netherlands	31
Belgium	19
5 March – Narodowy Stadion, Gdynia
Poland	18
Germany	23

Fifth-place Final
19 March – NRCA Stadium, Amsterdam
Netherlands	50
Germany	28
Seventh-place Final
19 March – NRCA Stadium, Amsterdam
Belgium	18
Poland	17

=== Semi-finals ===
4 March 2023
12:15 CET (UTC+1)

Netherlands	31–19	Belgium
Try: Bennie-Coulson (3) 7' c, 43' c, 73' c Raymond 39' c Con: Weersma (4/4) 8', 40', 44', 74'; Pen: Weersma (1/1) 80'	Report	Try: Remue 35' c Mortier 52' m Baudry 59' c Con: Remue (2/3) 36', 60'

NRCA Stadium, Amsterdam
Attendance: 1,250
Referee: Michael Todd (Scotland)

5 March 2023
20:00 CET (UTC+1)

Poland	18–23	Germany
Try: Halaifuana 14' c Wójtowicz 76' m Con: Piotrowicz (1/2) 16'; Pen: Piotrowicz (2/2) 43', 49'	Report	Try: Wolf 25' c Rodwell 66' c Con: Stella (2/2) 26', 67'; Pen: Stella (3/6) 3', 57', 62'

Narodowy Stadion, Gdynia
Attendance: 1,200
Referee: Gert Visser (Netherlands)

=== Seventh-place final ===
19 March 2023
12:30 CET (UTC+1)

Belgium	18–17	Poland
Try: Cornez 1' m Remue 63' c Con: Remue (1/2) 64'; Pen: Remue (2/2) 10', 28'	Report	Try: Zeszutek 5' c Taufui Halaifuana 78' c Con: Piotrowicz (2/2) 6', 79'; Pen: Piotrowicz (0/2); Szczepański (1/1) 25'

NRCA Stadium, Amsterdam
Attendance: 2,000
Referee: Cristian Şerban (Romania)

=== Fifth-place final ===
19 March 2023
15:00 CET (UTC+1)

Netherlands	50–28	Germany
Try: van der Avoird 1' c du Plessis 5' c Langelaan 14' c Bennie-Coulson (2) 35' c, 48' m Raymond 56' c Darlington (2) 69' m, 79' m Con: Weersma (5/7) 1', 6', 15', 36', 57'; Darlington (0/1); Pen: Weersma (0/1)	Report	Try: Rinklin 41' c L. Wolf 58' c Penalty try 63'; Lammers 72' c Con: Stella (3/3) 42', 59', 72'

NRCA Stadium, Amsterdam
Attendance: 2,750
Referee: Shota Tevzadze (Georgia)

== Grand finals ==
Semi-finals
5 March – Achvala Stadium, Tbilisi
Georgia	31
Romania	7
4 March – Estádio do Restelo, Lisbon
Portugal	27
Spain	10

Cup Final
19 March – Estadio Nuevo Vivero, Badajoz
Georgia	38
Portugal	11
Bronze Final
19 March – Estadio Nuevo Vivero, Badajoz
Romania	31
Spain	25

=== Semi-finals ===
4 March 2023
17:00 WET (UTC+0)

Portugal	27–10	Spain
Try: Marta 28' c Diniz 68' c Marques 71' c Con: Marques (3/3) 29', 69', 72'; Pen: Marques (2/3) 52', 55'	Report	Try: Peters 18' c Con: Vinuesa (1/1) 19'; Pen: Vinuesa (1/2) 2'

Estádio do Restelo, Lisbon
Attendance: 5,000
Referee: Thomas Charabas (France)

5 March 2023
16:00 GET (UTC+4)

Georgia	31–7	Romania
Try: Sharikadze 10' c Todua 34' c Penalty try 54'; Tabutsadze 80' c Con: Abzhandadze (2/2) 11', 35'; Matkava (1/1) 80'; Pen: Abzhandadze (1/1) 2'	Report	Try: Capatina 59' c Con: Melinte (1/1) 60'

Achvala Stadium, Tbilisi
Attendance: 2,600
Referee: Federico Vedovelli (Italy)

=== Bronze Final ===
19 March 2023
17:15 CET (UTC+1)

Romania	31–25	Spain
Try: Septar 40' m Chirica 42' c Pop 49' m Rupanu 52' m Con: Popoaia (1/4) 43'; Pen: Popoaia (1/1) 36'; Popa (2/2) 74', 80'	Report	Try: Dominguez Gatell 8' c Ferrer (2) 54' c, 69' m Con: Vinuesa Garcia (2/2) 9', 55'; Guemes (0/1); Pen: Vinuesa Garcia (2/2) 20', 47'

Estadio Nuevo Vivero, Badajoz
Attendance: 5,300
Referee: Chris Busby (Ireland)

=== Cup Final ===
19 March 2023
20:00 CET (UTC+1)

Georgia	38–11	Portugal
Try: Tabutsadze 14', 25' c Mamukashvili 43' c Papidze 62' c Tapladze 68' c Chkoidze 76' c Con: Abzhandadze (2/4) 15', 63'; Matkava (2/2) 69', 77'	Report	Try: Appleton 7' c Pen: Bento 52', 55'

Estadio Nuevo Vivero, Badajoz
Attendance: 6,000
Referee: Ludovic Cayre (France)

== Final standings ==
Pos.	Team	Points
1	Georgia	10
2	Portugal	8
3	Romania	6
4	Spain	5
5	Netherlands	4
6	Germany	3
7	Belgium	2
8	Poland	1

== Team of the Tournament ==
On 6 April 2023 Rugby Europe published its Team of the Tournament
Nuno Sousa Guedes was voted the player of the tournament by the fans.

Pos.		Player	Club / Province	Competition
LP	1	(Romania) Alexandru Savin	(Romania) Wolves	(Europe) Super Cup
HK	2	(Georgia (country)) Shalva Mamukashvili	(Georgia (country)) Black Lion	(Europe) Super Cup
TP	3	(Spain) Joaquín Domínguez	(Spain) Iberians	(Europe) Super Cup
LL	4	(Portugal) José Madeira	(France) Grenoble	(France) Pro D2
RL	5	(Spain) Josh Peters	(England) Newcastle Falcons	(England) Premiership
BF	6	(Georgia (country)) Giorgi Tsutskiridze	(France) Stade Français	(France) Top 14
OF	7	(Portugal) Nicolas Martins	(France) Soyaux Angoulême	(France) Pro D2
N8	8	(Romania) Cristi Chirica	(France) Carqueiranne	(France) Nationale
SH	9	(Georgia (country)) Vasil Lobzhanidze	(France) Brive	(France) Top 14
FH	10	(Georgia (country)) Tedo Abzhandadze	(France) Montauban	(France) Pro D2
LW	11	(Georgia (country)) Aka Tabutsadze	(Georgia (country)) Black Lion	(Europe) Super Cup
IC	12	(Romania) Taylor Gontineac	(France) Rouen	(France) Pro D2
OC	13	(Portugal) José Lima	(France) Narbonne	(France) Nationale
RW	14	(Portugal) Rodrigo Marta	(France) Dax	(France) Nationale
FB	15	(Portugal) Nuno Sousa Guedes	(Portugal) Lusitanos	(Europe) Super Cup

== International broadcasters ==
Country	Broadcaster	Summary
Belgium	—N/a	Rugby Europe (registration required)
Georgia	Rugby TV; Imedi TV	Georgia games shown live via Rugby TV and Imedi TV. Also Georgia games are streamed and free on Rugby TV Facebook page
Germany	—N/a	Rugby Europe (registration required)
Netherlands	Ziggo	Selected games live on Ziggo Sport
Poland	TVP Sport	Poland's home games shown live
Portugal	Sport TV	Portugal games shown live
Romania	—N/a	Rugby Europe (registration required)
Spain	Teledeporte	Spain games shown live via Teledeporte
France	RugbyZone	All games available through streaming via RugbyZone
North America	FloRugby	All games available through streaming via FloSports
Rest of the World	Rugby Europe	All games available through streaming via Rugby Europe (registration required). Some games are streamed and free on Rugby Europe Youtube channel

== See also ==
- Rugby Europe International Championships
- Antim Cup
