= Tornike Kakhoidze =

Georgia rugby union player

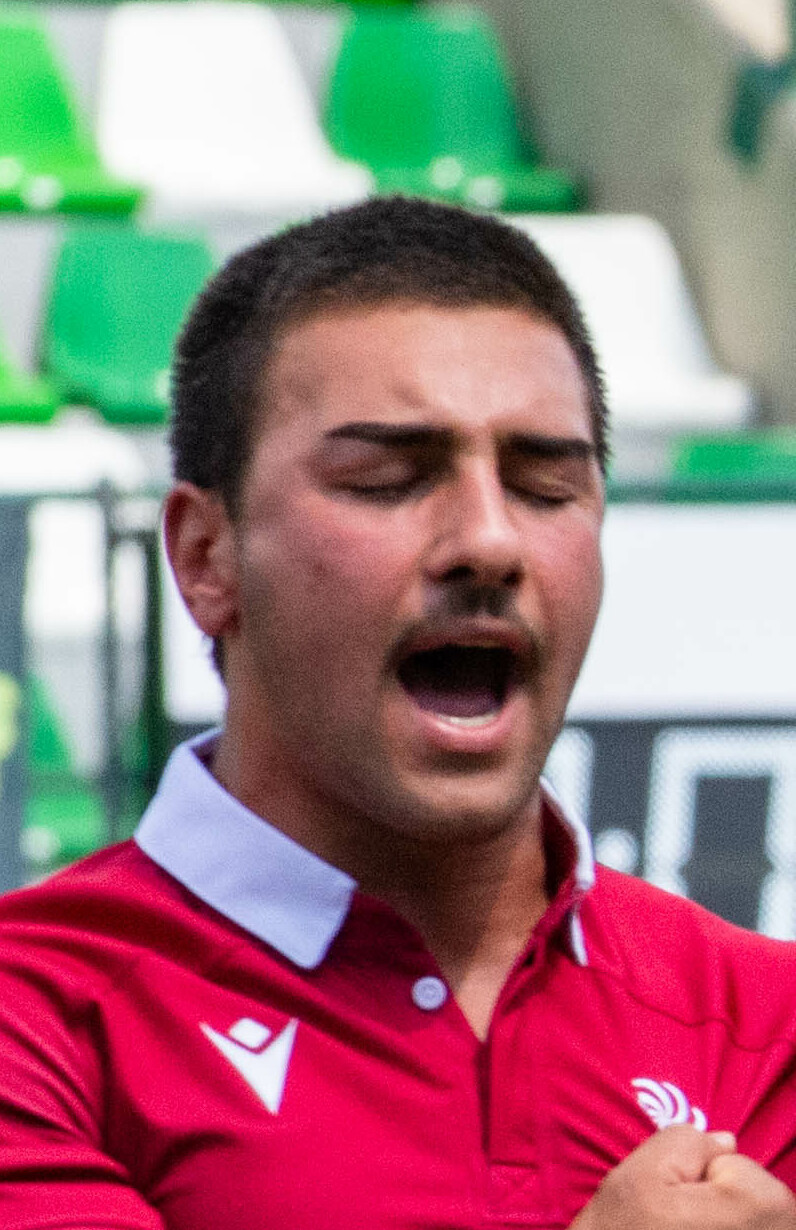
- Full name: Tornike Kakhoidze
- Born: 16 August 2003 (age 23) Georgia
- Height: 184 cm (6 ft 0 in)
- Weight: 93 kg (205 lb; 14 st 9 lb)

Rugby union career
- Position: Outside Centre
- Current team: Black Lion
Youth career
- Lelo Saracens
Senior career
| Years | Team | Apps | (Points) |
| 2021-2022 | Lelo Saracens | ?? | (??) |
| 2022- | Black Lion | 15 | (10) |
- Correct as of 2 August 2024
International career
| Years | Team | Apps | (Points) |
| 2021-2022 | Georgia under-18 | 3 | (2) |
| 2022-2023 | Georgia under-20 | 9 | (5) |
| 2022- | Georgia | 6 | (0) |
- Correct as of 14 August 2023

Tornike Kakhoidze (Georgian: თორნიკე კახოიძე; born 16 August 2003) is a Georgian rugby union player who plays at Black Lion in the Rugby Europe Super Cup and EPCR Challenge Cup.

== Career ==
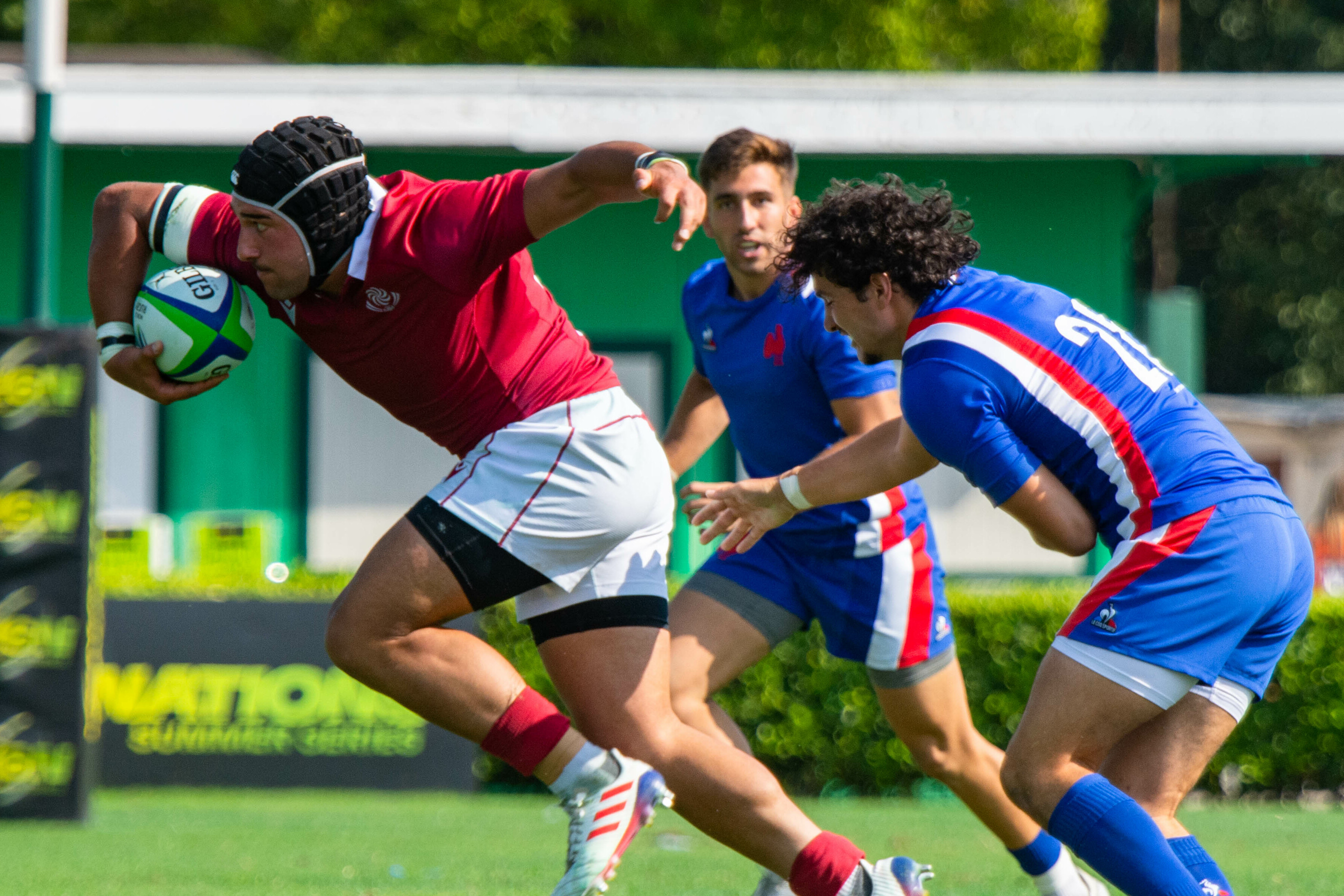
Tornike Kakhoidze with ball in hand against the French under-20 team during the U20 Six Nations Summer Series in 2022.

=== Club ===
==== Lelo Saracens ====
Kakhoidze began his career at Didi 10 side Lelo Saracens.

==== Black Lion ====
In 2022, he joined Georgian Rugby Europe Super Cup franchise Black Lion, helping the side win their second RESC trophy, making his debut in a 25–25 draw against Tel Aviv Heat.

=== International ===
==== Georgia Under-18 ====
He started in all three of Georgia's matches in their winning 2021 Rugby Europe Under-18 Championship campaign.

==== Georgia Under-20 ====
Kakhoidze at U20 World Cup in 2023

Kakhoidze made his debut at 17 going on to play in all of Georgia's matches for the Under-20 Summer Series, starting in a historic win against Scotland Under-20. He was named in the squad for the Under-20 World Championship, starting all the matches. Including historic wins over Italy Under-20 and Argentina Under-20. As well as scoring in the loss to Wales Under-20.

==== Georgia ====
He made his debut in the 2022 Rugby Europe Championship, coming off the bench against the Netherlands. He won his first start in the 2023 Rugby Europe Championship against Germany. In 2023 he was named in the Georgia squad for the 2023 Rugby World Cup warmups.

== Honors ==
=== Georgia Under-18 ===
- Rugby Europe Under-18 Championship
  - Champions: (1) 2021

=== Georgia ===
- Rugby Europe Championship
  - Champions: (3) 2022, 2023, 2024

=== Black Lion ===
- Rugby Europe Super Cup
  - Champions: (2) 2022, 2023
