= Nikoloz Khatiashvili =

Georgian rugby union player

Nika Khatiashvili
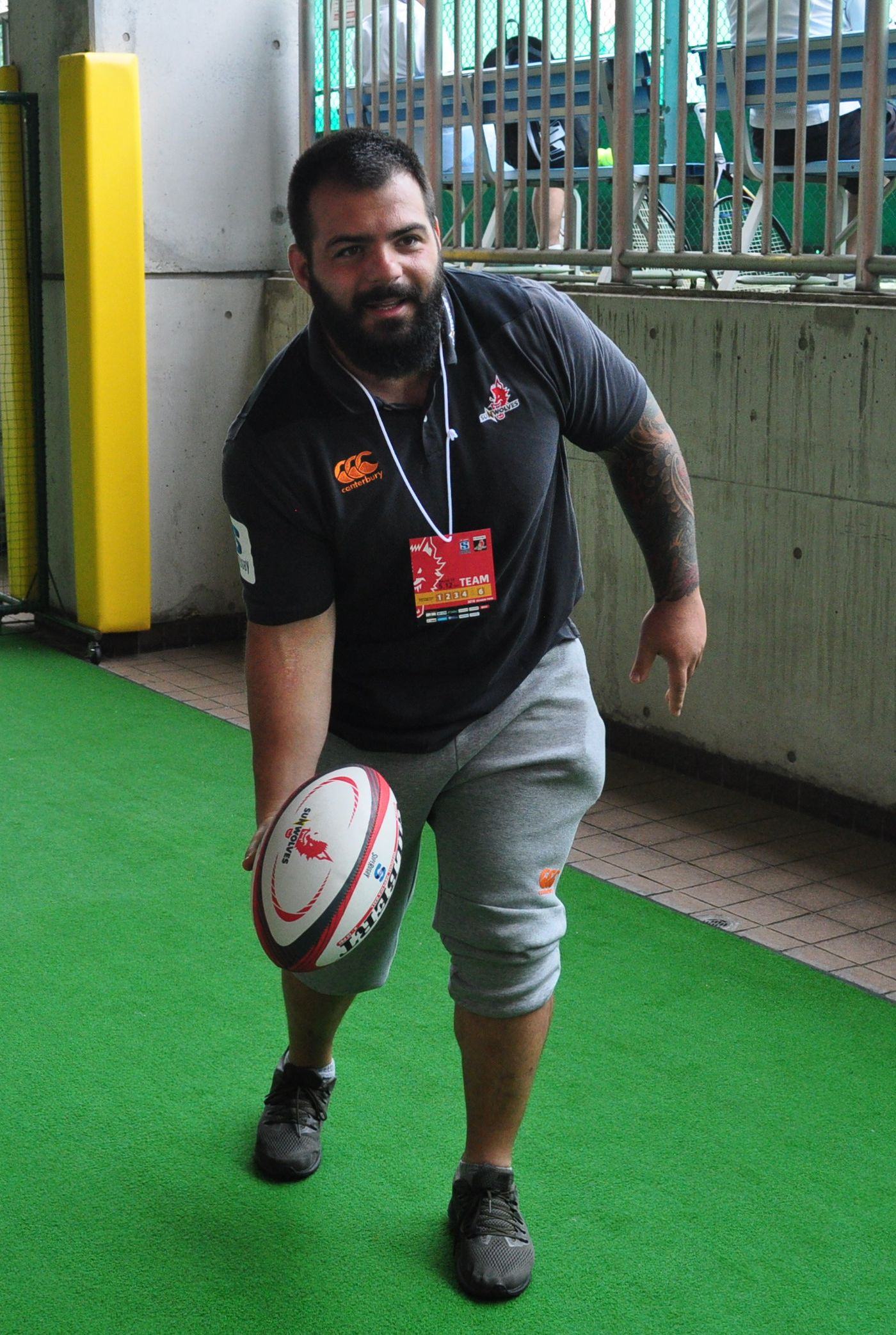
- Nika Khatiashvili in 2018
- Born: Nikoloz Khatiashvili; 22 May 1992 (age 34) Tbilisi, Georgia
- Height: 1.78 m (5 ft 10 in)
- Weight: 118 kg (18 st 8 lb)

Rugby union career
- Position: Prop
Senior career
Years	Team	Apps	(Points)
2014–2018	Aurillac	41	(10)
2018	Sunwolves	3	(0)
2018–2019	Soyaux Angoulême	3	(0)
2019–2020	Enisei-STM	25	(5)
2021	Houston SaberCats	12	(0)
2021–	Black Lion	25	(5)
- Correct as of 2 August 2024
International career
Years	Team	Apps	(Points)
2016–2022	Georgia	8	(0)
- Correct as of 2 August 2024

Nikoloz Khatiashvili (born 22 May 1992) is a Georgian rugby union player. His position is prop, and he currently plays for the Black Lion in the EPCR Challenge Cup and the Rugby Europe Super Cup.

== Club career ==
He spent 4 years at Aurillac in the Pro D2 before joining Japanese Super Rugby side the Sunwolves, on 7 April 2018, he made his debut of the bench in a 29–50 loss against the NSW Waratahs. He returned to the Pro D2 ahead of the 2018–19 season, joining Soyaux Angoulême.

In 2019 he moved to Russia to play for Enisei-STM, winning the Russian Professional Rugby League with the side and featuring in the 2019–20 EPCR Challenge Cup. He was signed by Houston SaberCats in the MLR, featuring 12 times before signing for Black Lion.

== Honours ==
=== Ensiei-STM ===
- Russian Professional Rugby League
  - Champions: (1) 2019–20

=== Black Lion ===
- Rugby Europe Super Cup
  - Champions: (3) 2021–22, 2022, 2023

=== Georgia ===
- Rugby Europe Championship
  - Champions: (2) 2021, 2022
