= Spike Salman =

- Born: Spike Salman; 25 January 2001 (age 25) France
- Height: 1.92 m (6 ft 3 1/2 in)
- Weight: 108 kg (17 st 0 lb; 238 lb)

Rugby union career
- Position: Flanker
- Current team: Tarbes
Youth career
- 2015–2019: Toulon
- 2019–2023: Racing 92
Senior career
| Years | Team | Apps | (Points) |
| 2023-2024 | RC Hyères Carqueiranne | 22 | (5) |
| 2024- | Tarbes | 13 | (5) |
- Correct as of 19 March 2025
International career
| Years | Team | Apps | (Points) |
| 2022– | Netherlands | 19 | (10) |
- Correct as of 19 March 2025

Spike Salman is a Dutch international rugby union player who currently plays for French Championnat Fédéral Nationale team Tarbes. He grew up in France however both his parents are Dutch and he has strong family connections to the Netherlands.

== Career ==
He began his career Marseille Méditerranée in France and went through the regional selection system and got chosen by the FFR to follow their school and rugby formation course.

He played for Toulon Espoirs for three years and then got scouted by Racing 92 to play for their Espoir team and train with the first team. He is yet to make his senior debut for Racing 92.

Salman earned his first cap in the 2022 Rugby Europe Championship, in the 10-72 defeat to Georgia. He scored his first and only international try so far in the same tournament, when playing in the 12-38 defeat to Romania.

He joined Nationale 1 side RC Hyères Carqueiranne in 2023 after failing to featured for Racing 92's first team, he featured 22 times in the season with the club finishing 11th. However due to financial difficulties RC Hyères Carqueiranne were automatically relegated to the 10th division, Salman moved to Tarbes for the 2024-25 season.
