= Vasile Balan (rugby union) =

Romania international rugby union player

Vasile Bălan
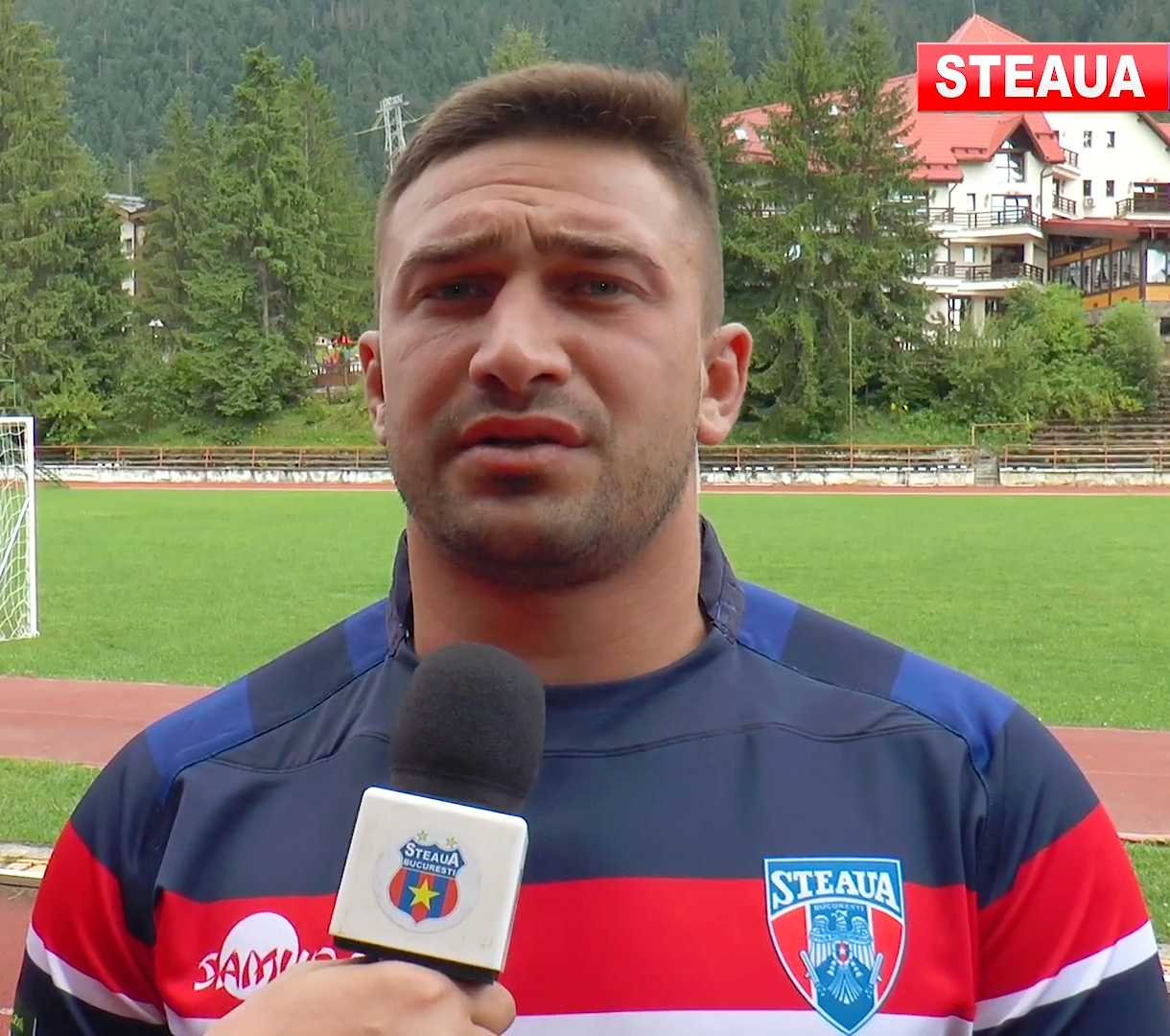
- Vasile Bălan in 2019
- Full name: Vasile Bălan
- Born: 7 February 1992 (age 34) Bârlad, Romania
- Height: 1.77 m (5 ft 9 1/2 in)
- Weight: 111 kg (17 st 7 lb; 245 lb)

Rugby union career
- Position: Prop
- Current team: Steaua București
Youth career
- CSS Bârlad
- RC Bârlad
Senior career
Years	Team	Apps	(Points)
2011–15	RC Bârlad		
2016–17	Politehnica Iași	8	(0)
2017–19	CSM București	20	(10)
2019–Present	Steaua București	3	(5)
- Correct as of 2 February 2020
International career
Years	Team	Apps	(Points)
2019–Present	Romania	1	(0)
- Correct as of 2 February 2020

Vasile Balan (born 7 February 1992) is a Romanian rugby union player. He plays as a prop for professional SuperLiga club Steaua București.

== Club career ==
Vasile Bălan started playing rugby as a youth for a school based local Romanian club, CSS Bârlad, in his native city of Bârlad. A logical move to the local club RC Bârlad followed. His professional debut came in 2016 for Politehnica Iași. After just one season with Politehnica he moved to Bucharest-based side, CSM where he played for two seasons. In 2019 he was signed by Steaua following the dissolution of his former club, CSM.

== International career ==
Bălan is also selected for Romania's national team, the Oaks, making his international debut during the Week 5 of 2019 Rugby Europe Championship in a match against the Zwarte Duivels / Diables Noirs on 17 March 2019.
