= Sandro Mamamtavrishvili =

Georgian rugby union player

- Born: 17 October 1998 (age 28) Georgia
- Height: 186 cm (6 ft 1 in)
- Weight: 95 kg (209 lb; 14 st 13 lb)

Rugby union career
- Position: Flanker
- Current team: Lokomotiv Penza
Senior career
Years	Team	Apps	(Points)
20??–2023	Lelo Saracens		
2021–2024	Black Lion	35	(20)
2024–	Lokomotiv Penza		
- Correct as of 30 July 2024
International career
Years	Team	Apps	(Points)
2017–2018	Georgia U20	5	(0)
2022–	Georgia	7	(0)
- Correct as of 30 July 2024
National sevens team
Years	Team		Comps
2019	Georgia		3
- Correct as of 30 July 2024

Sandro Mamamtavrishvili (born 17 October 1998 in Georgia) is a Georgian rugby union player who plays for Lokomotiv Penza in the Russian Rugby Championship. His playing position is flanker. He was named in the Black Lion squad for the 2022 Currie Cup First Division. He has also represented Georgia international in both the 15-man code and in rugby sevens.
