= Fernando López (rugby union) =

- Born: Fernando Martín López Pérez; 14 March 1986 (age 40) Buenos Aires, Argentina
- Height: 180 cm (5 ft 11 in)
- Weight: 112 kg (17 st 9 lb; 247 lb)

Rugby union career
- Position: Prop
Amateur team(s)
Years	Team	Apps	(Points)
1999–2009	Rugby Club San Marcos		
Senior career
Years	Team	Apps	(Points)
2009–2014	Club Pucará	84	(110)
2014–2016	Massy	29	(15)
2016–2020	Ordizia	75	(70)
2020–2021	Tarbes	11	(0)
2021–	Berre	5	(0)
- Correct as of 12 May 2024
International career
Years	Team	Apps	(Points)
2015–	Spain	60	(20)
- Correct as of 12 May 2024

Fernando López (born 14 March 1986) is an Argentine born Spanish rugby union player that currently plays as a Prop for Tarbes in the Championnat Nationale.

== Early career ==
Fernando López began playing rugby at the age of 12 for his home-town team Rugby Club San Marcos in San Marcos. His passion for rugby as well as his skills at Prop would eventually earn Fernando López a contract with Club Pucará, a professional team in the Argentine Top 12, 10 years after he started playing the sport.

== Professional career ==
In 2009, Fernando López would start playing professionally for Club Pucará, but it wasn't until 2011, when he became a non-negotiable starter for his team and would impress the eyes of many teams which had him on their radar, and upon 2014, Massy signed Fernando López on a two-year contract with the then Pro D2 side. In January 2015, the Spanish national rugby union team would call him up since he was eligible to play for Spain due to his Spanish roots and would later become the captain of his adopted country. One year in his international career, López signed with Ordizia in the División de Honor to be closer to his national team Spain. Late in 2020, López joined Tarbes in the Championnat Nationale. After 11 matches at Tarbes, it was announced in April 2021 that López signed with Fédérale 1 side Berre.
