= Joel Merkler =

Spain international rugby union player

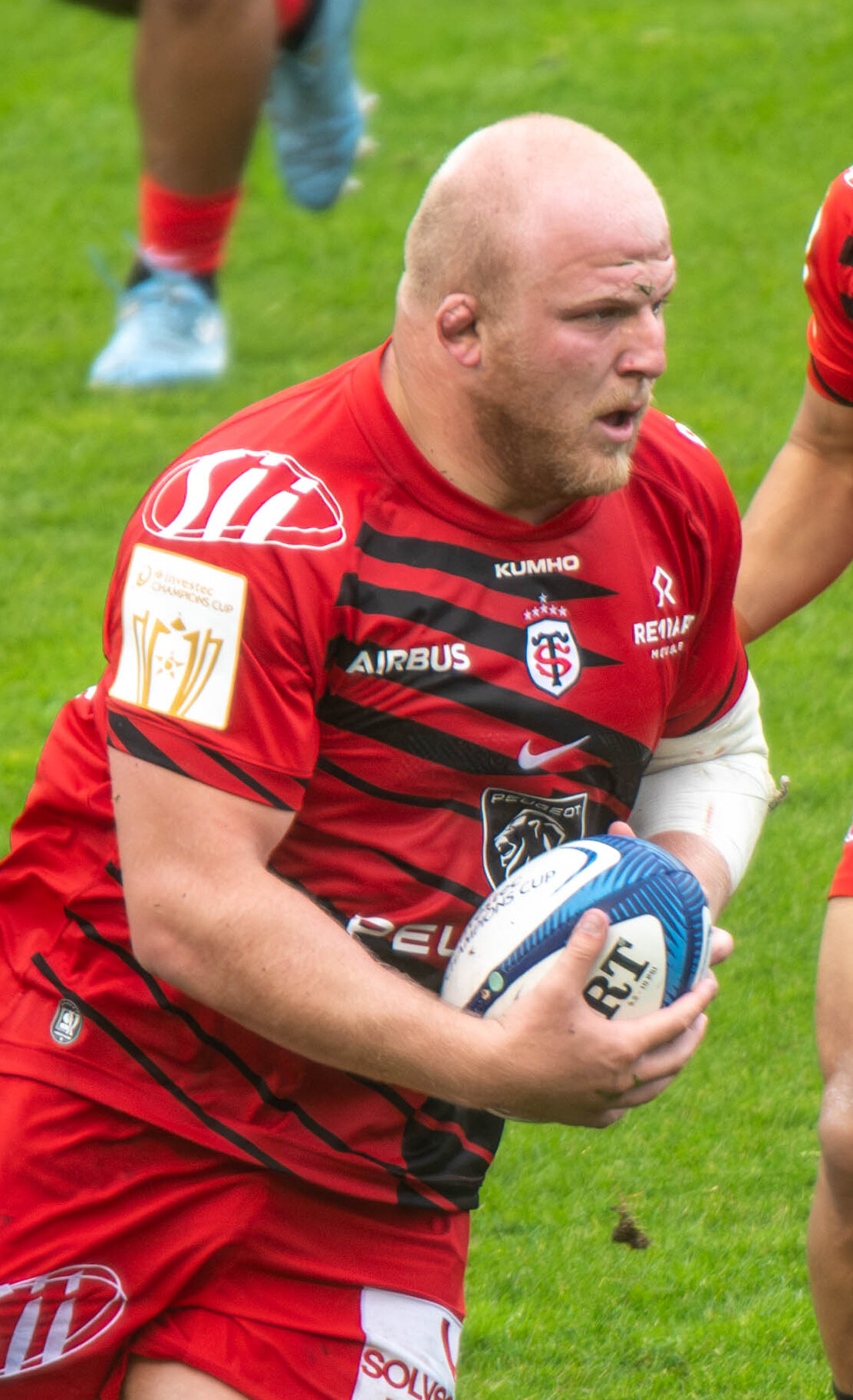
- Born: Joel Merkler-Pérez; 25 October 2001 (age 25) Gelida, Spain
- Height: 1.94 m (6 ft 4 1/2 in)
- Weight: 135 kg (298 lb)

Rugby union career
- Position(s): Tighthead prop, lock
Senior career
Years	Team	Apps	(Points)
2020–2021	→ FCTT	6	(0)
2022–	Toulouse	88	(20)
- Correct as of 28 October 2026
International career
Years	Team	Apps	(Points)
2021–	Spain	11	(5)
- Correct as of 28 October 2026

Joel Merkler (born 25 October 2001) is a Spanish international rugby union player, who plays for Toulouse and the Spain national team.

== Club career ==
Started playing in Club de Rugby Sant Cugat and later having rose through the Stade Toulousain academy, Joel Merkler first played his senior rugby on loan for their amateur neighbour of FCTT in Fédérale 1 for the 2020–21 season. Still playing with the espoirs of the Top 14 club, he won the national under-21 championship in June 2021.

In October 2022, he made his debut for the club, replacing Emmanuel Meafou at lock, in a 26–22 loss against Bayonne.

On May 25, 2024, Merkler won the European Champions Cup final with Toulouse's victory against Leinster (31–22) at the Tottenham Hotspur Stadium. In doing so, he became the first Spaniard to ever win the tournament.

== International career ==
Merkler made his debut for Spain on 1 November 2021, replacing Andrés Alvarado during a 20–32 away win over Uruguay, that had just qualified for 2023 World Cup, as the American top team.

In March 2024, with Merkler having not played for Spain since November 2022, a 34–15 victory against Namibia, head coach, Fabien Galthié, enquired into the possibility of him playing for the France national team on residency, before being advised by World Rugby that this would not be possible under the eligibility rules. However, through his father, he was still eligible to play for England after the mandatory 3 year stand-down period, if he signed for an English club. In February 2025, re-affirmed his commitment to Spain, turning out for side once again during their 53–24 victory against the Netherlands in the Rugby Europe Championship.

== Style of play ==
A tall and fairly massive player, Merkler is able to play both as a prop (mainly a tighthead) or a lock, higher in the forward pack.

== Honours ==
Toulouse

- 1× European Rugby Champions Cup: 2024
- 4× Top 14: 2023, 2024, 2025, 2026
