= San Marcos, Salta =

Coordinates: 22°32′38″S 65°07′12″W

San Marcos
- Municipality and village
- Interactive map of San Marcos
- Country: Argentina
- Province: Salta Province
- Time zone: UTC−3 (ART)

San Marcos is a village and rural municipality in Salta Province in northwestern Argentina.
