= Grigor Kerdikoshvili =

Georgian rugby union player

- Born: 15 November 1994 (age 31) Gori, Georgia
- Height: 200 cm (6 ft 7 in)
- Weight: 114 kg (251 lb; 17 st 13 lb)

Rugby union career
- Position: Lock
- Current team: Black Lion
Youth career
- 20??-2017: US Air Force Academy
Senior career
Years	Team	Apps	(Points)
2017-2018	Glendale Merlins		
2018	Colorado Raptors	2	(5)
2018-2021	Lelo Saracens		
2021-2022	Agen	2	(5)
2023–	Black Lion	9	(5)
- Correct as of 30 July 2024
International career
Years	Team	Apps	(Points)
2019–	Georgia	12	(10)
- Correct as of 30 July 2024

Grigor Kerdikoshvili (born 15 November 1994 in Georgia) is a Georgian rugby union player who plays for Agen in the Rugby Pro D2. His playing position is lock. Kerdikoshvili signed for Agen in 2021, having previously represented Colorado Raptors in Major League Rugby and Lelo Saracens. He made his debut for Georgia in 2019 against Spain.

== Honours ==
=== Colorado Raptors ===
- Major League Rugby
  - Runners-up: (1) 2018

=== Black Lion ===
- Rugby Europe Super Cup
  - Champions: (1) 2023

=== Georgia ===
- Rugby Europe Championship
  - Champions: (3) 2019, 2022, 2024
