= Florin Bărdașu =

Romania international rugby union player

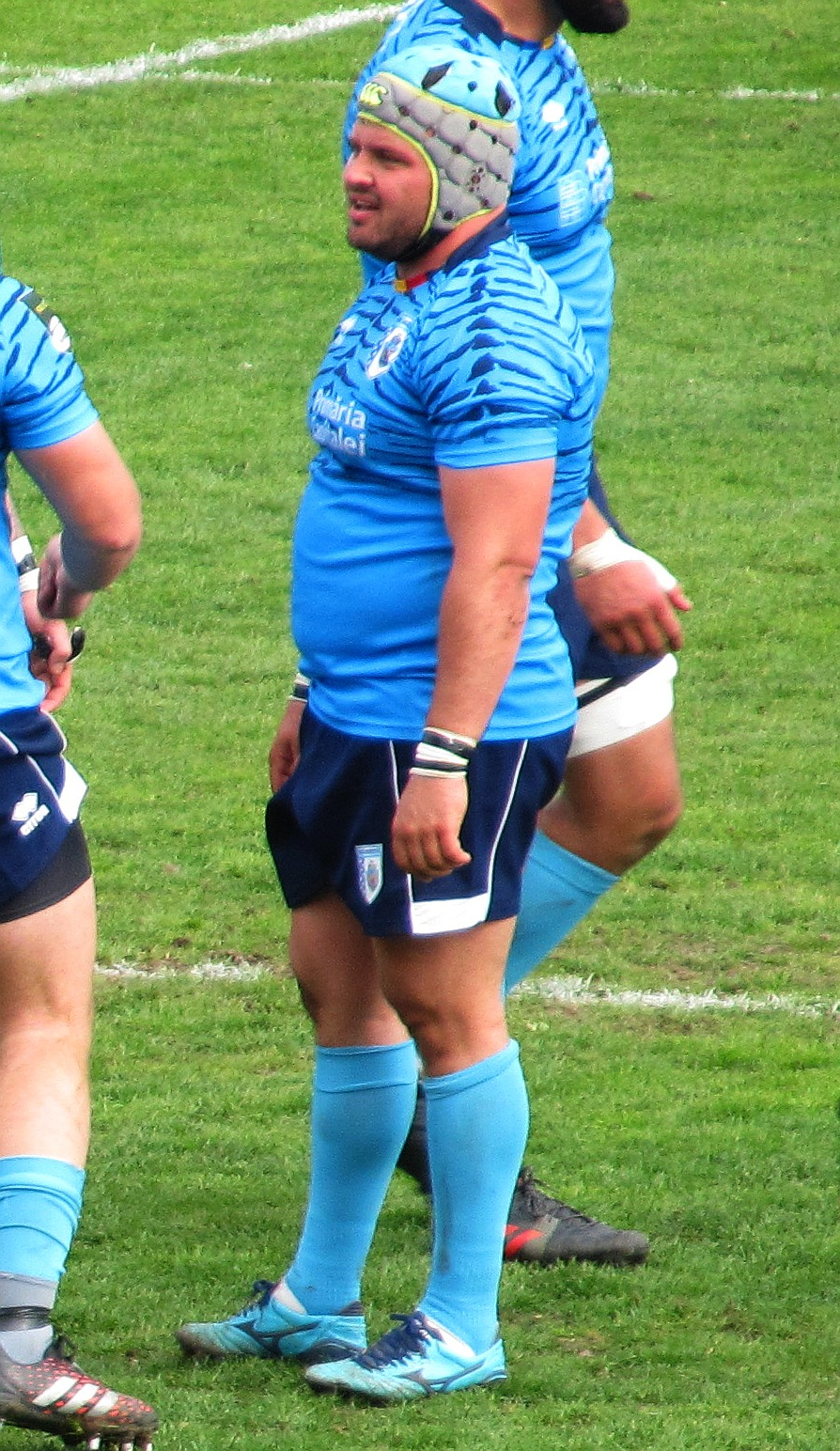
- Florin Bărdașu playing for CSM București during the 2019 Cupa României Final
- Born: Florin Vasile Bărdașu; 23 September 1991 (age 35) Negrilești, Romania
- Height: 1.74 m (5 ft 8 1/2 in)
- Weight: 102 kg (16 st 1 lb; 225 lb)

Rugby union career
- Position: Hooker
Senior career
Years	Team	Apps	(Points)
2013–14	București Wolves	10	(0)
- Correct as of 21 May 2016
Provincial / State sides
Years	Team	Apps	(Points)
2013–	Baia Mare	32	(5)
- Correct as of 21 May 2016
International career
Years	Team	Apps	(Points)
2016–	Romania	11	(10)
- Correct as of 25 August 2023

Florin Vasile Bărdașu (born 23 September 1991) is a Romanian rugby union player. He plays in the hooker position for professional SuperLiga club Baia Mare and formerly for București based European Challenge Cup side the Wolves. He also plays for Romania's national team the Oaks.
