= Vitaly Zhivatov =

Russian rugby union player

- Born: 16 February 1992 (age 34)
- Height: 185 cm (6 ft 1 in)
- Weight: 98 kg (216 lb)

Rugby union career
- Position: Back row
- Current team: VVA-Podmoskovye
Senior career
Years	Team	Apps	(Points)
- VVA-Podmoskovye
- Correct as of 14 September 2019
International career
Years	Team	Apps	(Points)
2014–present	Russia	9	(0)
- Correct as of 14 September 2019

Vitaly Zhivatov (born 16 February 1992) is a Russian rugby union player who generally plays as a back row represents Russia internationally.

He was included in the Russian squad for the 2019 Rugby World Cup which is scheduled to be held in Japan for the first time and also marks his first World Cup appearance.

== Career ==
He made his international debut for Russia against Hong Kong on 8 November 2014.
