= Lionel Campergue =

Portuguese rugby union player

- Full name: Lionel Campergue
- Born: 24 November 1987 (age 38) Pyrénées-Atlantiques, France
- Height: 170 cm (5 ft 7 in)
- Weight: 98 kg (216 lb; 15 st 6 lb)

Rugby union career
- Position: Hooker
- Current team: Bassin d'Arcachon
Youth career
- 2004-2007: Section Paloise
Senior career
Years	Team	Apps	(Points)
2007-2011	Section Paloise	76	(0)
2011-2013	Colomiers Rugby	22	(10)
2013-2015	CA Périgueux	35	(0)
2015-2016	AS Mâcon Rugby	14	(0)
2016-2017	US Cognac	17	(5)
2017-2021	UCS Cognac	68	(10)
2021-2023	Bassin d'Arcachon	26	(5)
Total	2007-2023	258	(30)
- Correct as of 1 August 2023
International career
Years	Team	Apps	(Points)
2011-	Portugal	17	(10)
- Correct as of 1 August 2023

Lionel Campergue (born 24 November 1987) is a French-born Portuguese rugby union player who plays as a hooker.

== Club career ==
=== Section Paloise ===
Campergue joined Pau Espoirs at 17 in 2004. He went on to make his debut in 2011 for the ProD2 side. For 4 years he played with the French side before leaving to join Colomiers.

=== Colomiers ===
In his first season with Colomiers he helped them gain promotion to the ProD2. After a season returning to the ProD2 with only 6 appearances, Campergue joins Fédérale 1 side CA Périgueux.

=== CA Périgueux ===
He spent 2 years at the club before joining rival side AS Macon Rugby.

=== AS Macon Rugby ===
After only 14 appearances at the Fédérale 1 side he left.

=== US Cognac / Union Cognac Saint-Jean-d'Angély ===
In 2016 he joined US Cognac playing one season before the team merged with Rugby Athletic Club Angérien to form Union Cognac Saint-Jean-d'Angély, where Campergue stayed for another 4 years.

=== Bassin d'Arcachon ===
He joined Bassin d'Arcachon in 2021. He announced he was retiring after the 2023 Rugby World Cup.

== International career ==
Qualifying through his Portuguese mother, he made his debut for the Portuguese national team in 2010 against the USA. He helped his national team qualify for the 2023 Rugby World Cup.
