= Luka Japaridze =

Georgian rugby union player

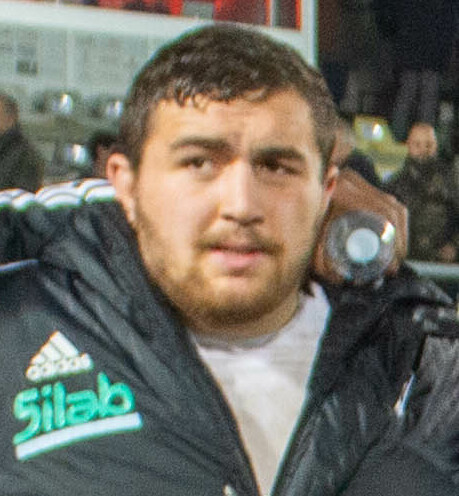
- Born: Luka Japaridze; 6 September 1998 (age 28) Tbilisi, Georgia
- Height: 1.81 m (5 ft 11 1/2 in)
- Weight: 126 kg (19 st 12 lb; 278 lb)

Rugby union career
- Position: Tighthead prop
Senior career
Years	Team	Apps	(Points)
2017–2018	Lelo Saracens	0	(0)
2018-	CA Brive	42	(5)
International career
Years	Team	Apps	(Points)
2016-2017	Georgia U18	6	(0)
2017-2018	Georgia U20	4	(0)
2021-	Georgia	6	(0)

Luka Japaridze (born 6 September 1998 in Svaneti, Georgia) is a rugby union player who currently plays for MHR Montpellier Héraut Rugby in the Top 14 and also plays internationally for Georgia as a prop.
