= Manuel Ordas =

- Born: Manuel Ordas; 21 February 1998 (age 28) Bayonne, France
- Height: 1.87 m (6 ft 2 in)
- Weight: 82 kg (12 st 13 lb)

Rugby union career
- Position: Fly-half
Amateur team(s)
Years	Team	Apps	(Points)
2004–2014	Anglet		
2014–2017	Bayonne		
Senior career
Years	Team	Apps	(Points)
2017–2022	Bayonne	55	(137)
2022-	Reef Raiders		
- Correct as of 13 May 2024
International career
Years	Team	Apps	(Points)
2021–	Spain	10	(24)
- Correct as of 13 May 2024

Manuel Ordas (born 21 February 1998) is a French-born Spanish rugby union player and he plays at fly-half.
