= Marco Pinto =

Portuguese footballer

Personal information
- Full name: Marco António Garcia Pinto
- Date of birth: 22 March 1988 (age 38)
- Place of birth: Camarate, Portugal
- Height: 1.82 m (6 ft 0 in)
- Position: Goalkeeper

Youth career
- 1997–1999: Águias Camarate
- 1999–2000: Frielas
- 2000–2001: Águias Camarate
- 2001–2005: Sporting CP
- 2005–2007: Belenenses

Senior career*
Years	Team	Apps	(Gls)
2007–2008	Belenenses	0	(0)
2007–2008	→ Mafra (loan)	2	(0)
2008–2009	Beira-Mar Monte Gordo	3	(0)
2009–2010	Estrela Amadora	8	(0)
2010	Praiense	1	(0)
2011–2012	Pêro Pinheiro	29	(0)
2012–2016	1º Dezembro	88	(0)
2016–2018	Aves	6	(0)
2018	→ Canelas 2010 (loan)	10	(0)
2018–2019	Mirandela	8	(0)
2019–2020	Loures	24	(0)
2020–2023	Aves 1930	47	(0)
2024–2025	Caçadores Taipas	21	(0)
Total		247	(0)

International career
2006–2007	Portugal U19	2	(0)
2008	Portugal U20	2	(0)
- * Club domestic league appearances and goals

Marco António Garcia Pinto (born 22 March 1988) is a Portuguese former professional footballer who played as a goalkeeper.

== Club career ==
Born in Camarate, Loures, Lisbon District, Pinto competed in lower league and amateur football until the age of 28, appearing rarely for all his teams except his last, S.U. 1º Dezembro. In late May 2016, he left the third division side and signed a two-year deal with C.D. Aves from the Segunda Liga.

On 12 March 2017, ten days shy of his 29th birthday, Pinto made his debut as a professional, coming on as a late substitute for Femi Balogun as Quim was sent off in a 1–1 away draw against Leixões SC. On 29 May, having made a further five appearances to help the club to return to the Primeira Liga after an absence of ten years, he renewed his contract until June 2019.
