= Gabriel Rupanu =

Romania international rugby union player

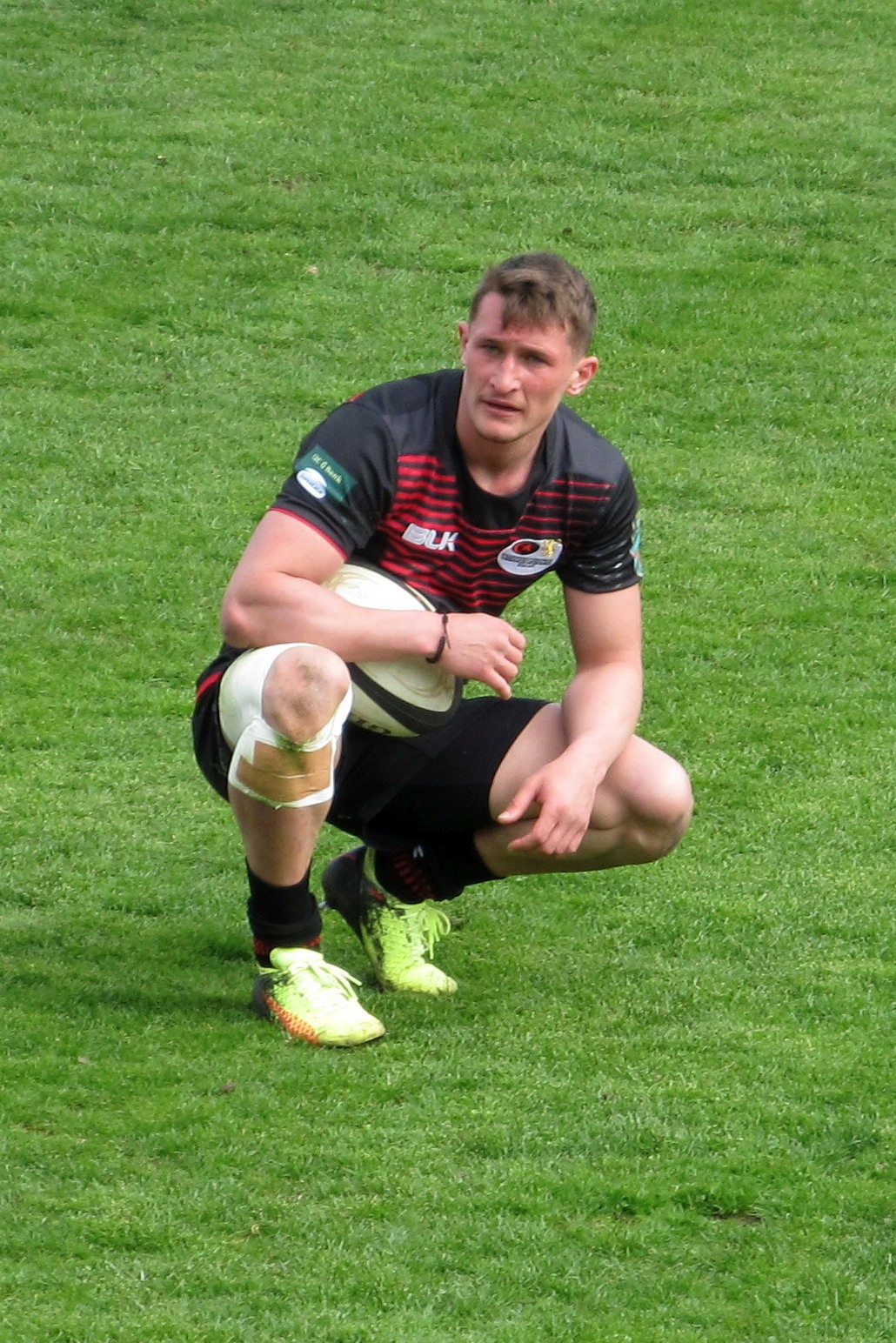
- Gabriel Rupanu playing for Timișoara Saracens during the 2019 Cupa României Final
- Full name: Gabriel Vasile Rupanu
- Born: 28 September 1997 (age 29) Prisacani, Romania
- Height: 1.76 m (5 ft 9 1/2 in)
- Weight: 73 kg (11 st 7 lb; 161 lb)

Rugby union career
- Position: Scrum-half
- Current team: Timișoara Saracens
Youth career
- CSS Bârlad
Senior career
Years	Team	Apps	(Points)
201?–17	RC Bârlad	?	(?)
2017–Present	Timișoara Saracens	29	(20)
- Correct as of 12 January 2019
International career
Years	Team	Apps	(Points)
2019–Present	Romania	1	(0)
- Correct as of 12 January 2019

Gabriel Vasile Rupanu (born 28 September 1997) is a Romanian rugby union player. He plays as a scrum-half for professional SuperLiga club Timișoara Saracens.

== Club career ==
Gabriel Rupanu started playing rugby as a youth for a local school Romanian club based in Bârlad and then started his professional journey joining the youth ranks of the local team in the same city. After making a good impression Bârlad, under the supervision of several coaches including Ioan Harnagea, Ciprian Popa and Dan Tufaru, in early 2017 he was signed by SuperLiga side, Timișoara Saracens.

== International career ==
Rupanu is also selected for Romania's national team, the Oaks, making his international debut in a test match against the Los Cóndores on 8 June 2019.
