= Fred Quercy =

Spain international rugby union player

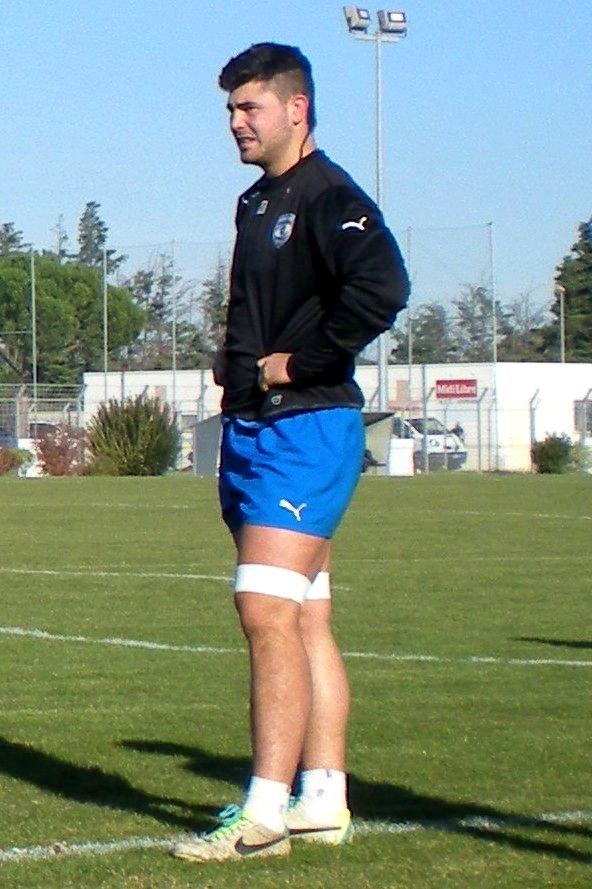
- Full name: Frédéric Quercy
- Born: 6 July 1991 (age 35)
- Height: 6 ft 2 in (188 cm)
- Weight: 227 lb (103 kg)

Rugby union career
- Position: Back-row
International career
Years	Team	Apps	(Points)
2017–	Spain	15	(20)

Frédéric Quercy (born 6 July 1991) is a French professional rugby union player of Spanish descent.

== Biography ==
A native of Béziers, Quercy was a boxer in his youth, but quit at the age of 16 to focus on rugby, a sport both his father and grandfather had played. His grandfather won a national championship with AS Béziers and it was at that club that Quercy originally trained. He was a French representative player at under-18 and under-19 level.

== Career ==
Quercy, a back-row forward, got started in senior rugby at Montpellier Hérault, where he played in the Top 14 and Heineken Cup. Since leaving Montpellier, Quercy has played his rugby in the Pro D2, with SC Albi, USON Nevers and US Montauban.

== International career ==
He competes for Spain in international rugby, by virtue of having a paternal grandmother from Valencia. In 2022, Quercy scored a try in Spain's 33–28 win over Portugal that secured qualification for the World Cup, but their place in the tournament was taken away after they were found to have earlier fielded an ineligible player.

== See also ==
- List of Spain national rugby union players
