= Dragoș Ser =

Romania international rugby union player

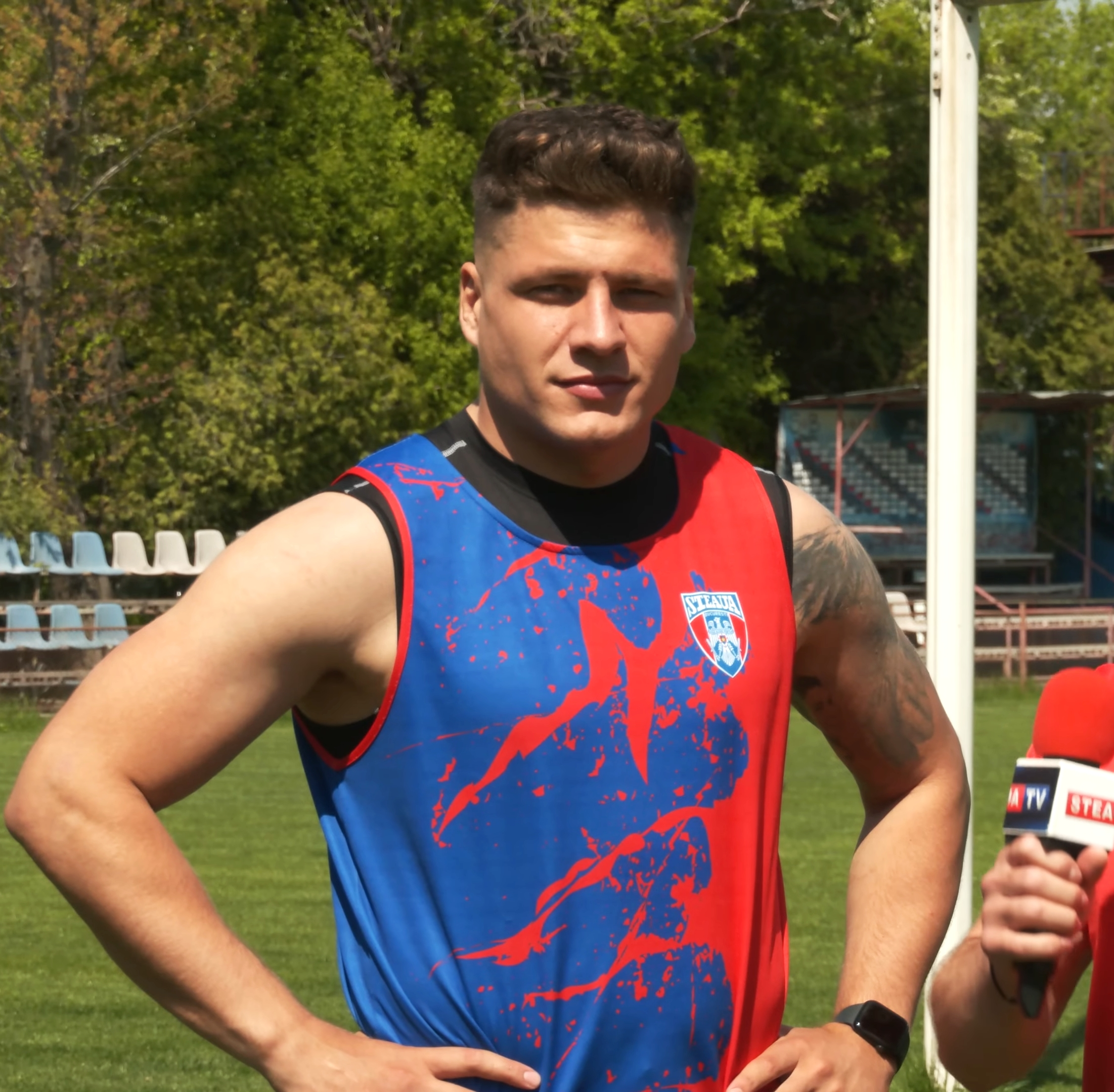
- Dragoș Ser in 2022
- Full name: Dragoș Petre Ser
- Born: 4 March 1999 (age 27) Costinești, Romania
- Height: 1.87 m (6 ft 1 1/2 in)
- Weight: 102 kg (16 st 1 lb; 225 lb)

Rugby union career
- Position(s): Flanker, back row
- Current team: Steaua
Youth career
- 2013–2017: CSM București
Senior career
Years	Team	Apps	(Points)
2017–2019	CSM București	6	(10)
2019–Present	Steaua București	7	(0)
- Correct as of 14 March 2020
International career
Years	Team	Apps	(Points)
- Romania U-20
2020–Present	Romania	4	(0)
- Correct as of 14 March 2020

Dragoș Petre Ser (born 4 March 1999) is a Romanian rugby union rugby player. He plays as a flanker for professional SuperLiga club Steaua București.

== Club career ==
Ser played for CSM București and then transferred to Steaua in 2019 following the dissolution of his former club. He also played for the Romania national under-20 rugby union team.

== International career ==
Ser was selected for Romania's national team, the Oaks, making his international debut during Week 1 of 2020 Rugby Europe Championship against the Lelos on 1 February 2020.
