= Jerónimo Portela =

Portuguese rugby player (born 2000)

- Born: Miguel Jerónimo Fernandes Thomaz Portela Morais; 2 November 2000 (age 26) Lisbon, Portugal
- Height: 1.92 m (6 ft 3 1/2 in)
- Weight: 87 kg (13 st 10 lb)

Rugby union career
- Position: Fly-half
International career
Years	Team	Apps	(Points)
2022–	Portugal	28	(31)
- Correct as of 31 October 2023

Jerónimo Portela Morais, (born 2 November 2000) is a Portuguese rugby union player. He plays fly-half for Lusitanos XV and Portugal Rugby at international level.

== Personal life ==
He is the son of Miguel Portela, the former Portuguese rugby union player who played at 2007 Rugby World Cup.
