= Pedro Bettencourt =

Portuguese rugby union player

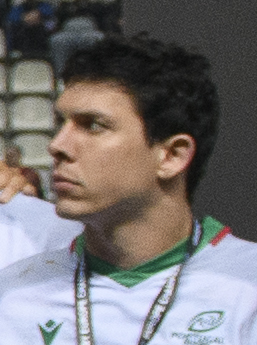
- Born: 18 November 1994 (age 31) Porto, Portugal
- Height: 1.88 m (6 ft 2 in)
- Weight: 94 kg (14 st 11 lb; 207 lb)

Rugby union career
- Position(s): Centre, wing, fullback
Senior career
Years	Team	Apps	(Points)
2013–2014	Lusitanos XV	4	(5)
2014–2016	Clermont	0	(0)
2016–2018	Carcassonne	33	(15)
2018–2019	Newcastle Falcons	11	(5)
2019-2024	Oyonnax Rugby	75	(35)
- Correct as of 27 juin 2024
International career
Years	Team	Apps	(Points)
2013–2024	Portugal	36	(125)
- Correct as of 27 juin 2024

Pedro Bettencourt Ávila (born Porto, 18 November 1994) is a Portuguese rugby union player. His usual position is as a centre.

== Club career ==
He played for Lusitanos XV, in Portugal, in 2013/14. He played for Clermont (2014/15-2015/16) and for Carcassonne (2016/17-2017/18). He played for Newcastle Falcons in 2018/19. He plays for Oyonnax Rugby since 2019/20.

== International career ==
He has 22 caps for Portugal, since 2013, with 4 tries, 7 conversions and 22 penalties scored, 100 points on aggregate. He had his first cap at the 36-13 loss to Fiji, at 9 November 2013, in Lisbon, in a tour, aged 19 years old.
