= Hinckley Vaovasa =

Romania international rugby union player

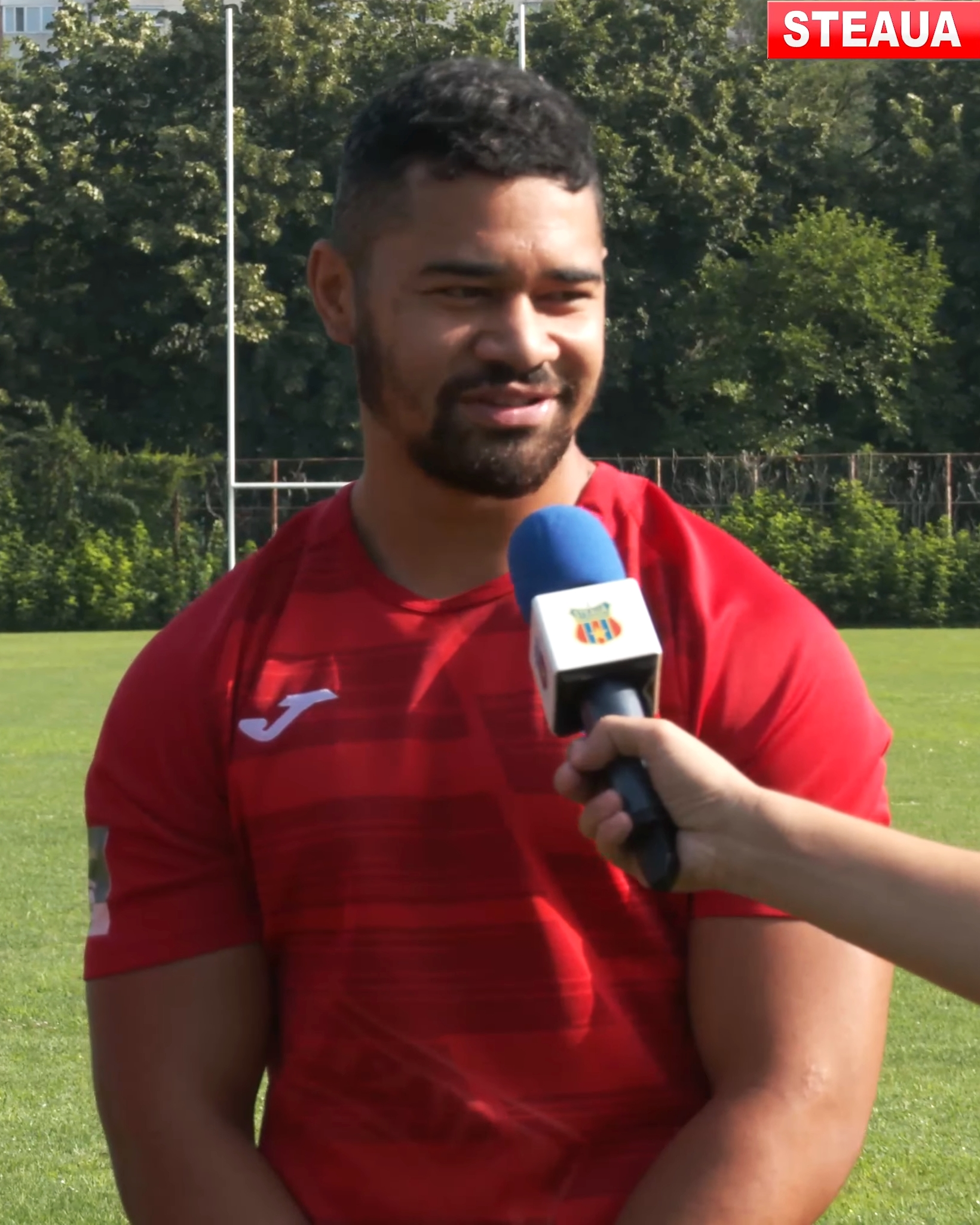
- Hinckley Vaovasa in 2021
- Full name: Hinckley Vaovasa Tuiala
- Born: 24 September 1998 (age 28) Wellington, New Zealand
- Height: 1.80 m (5 ft 11 in)
- Weight: 87 kg (13 st 10 lb; 192 lb)

Rugby union career
- Position: Fly Half
- Current team: Dinamo București
Senior career
Years	Team	Apps	(Points)
2017–2019	CSM Bucuresti	15	(55)
2019-21	Timișoara	14	(30)
2021-	Steaua București		
- Correct as of 14 May 2022
International career
Years	Team	Apps	(Points)
2021–	Romania	6	(20)
- Correct as of 14 May 2022

Hinckley Vaovasa (born 24 September 1998) is a New Zealand-born Romanian rugby union football player. He plays in the fly-half position for professional Liga Națională de Rugby club Dinamo București.

Hinckley also plays for Romania's national team, the Oaks, making his international debut in a test match against the Uruguay national rugby union team.
