= Ovidiu Cojocaru =

Romania international rugby union player

- Full name: Ovidiu Cojocaru
- Born: 19 November 1996 (age 29) Pașcani, Romania
- Height: 1.78 m (5 ft 10 in)
- Weight: 105
- School: Gh.Duca Costanta

Rugby union career
- Position: Hooker
- Current team: CS Dinamo
Youth career
- 2010–11: CFR Pașcani
- 2011–15: CS Cleopatra Mamaia
Senior career
Years	Team	Apps	(Points)
2012-2015	CS Cleopatra Mamaia	?	(?)
2015–2022	CSM Baia Mare	60	(35)
- Correct as of 13 January 2019
International career
Years	Team	Apps	(Points)
2017–Present	Romania	34	(35)
- Correct as of 13 January 2019

Ovidiu Cojocaru (born 19 November 1996) is a Romanian rugby union player. He plays as a hooker for professional SuperLiga club CSM Baia Mare.

== Club career ==
Ovidiu Cojocaru started playing rugby in 2010 as a youth for CFR, a local Romanian club based in Pașcani. After one year he moved to the seaside joining CS Cleopatra Mamaia. In July 2015 he started his professional journey joining SuperLiga side, CSM Baia Mare.

== International career ==
Cojocaru is also selected for Romania's national team, the Oaks, making his international debut in a test match against the Tupis on 24 June 2017.
