= Jon Zabala =

Spain international rugby union player

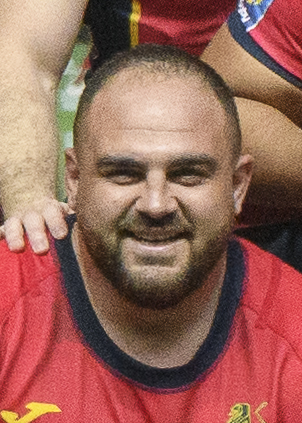
- Born: Jon Zabala Arrieta; 27 November 1996 (age 29) Getxo, Spain
- Height: 1.92 m (6 ft 3 1/2 in)
- Weight: 128 kg (282 lb)

Rugby union career
- Position: Prop
Senior career
Years	Team	Apps	(Points)
2016–2019	Bayonne	11	(0)
2019–2020	→ Anglet ORC (loan)	15	(0)
2020–2021	Tarbes	18	(5)
2021–2024	Bézier	68	(15)
2024–	Pau	25	(0)
- Correct as of 6 December 2025
International career
Years	Team	Apps	(Points)
2016	Spain U20	4	(10)
2017–	Spain	29	(5)
- Correct as of 16 March 2025

Jon Zabala Arrieta (born 27 November 1996) is a Spanish rugby union player, who plays for Pau. He is an international player with Spain national rugby team.

== Club career ==
Zabala began his career as a second row with Getxo Rugby Taldea, the team from his hometown. He quickly advanced through the ranks, reaching the first team as a second row. During a match for a Basque players' combined team (Euskarians Rugby), Zabala was discovered by Pierre Peytavin and Peio Álvarez, two scouts from Aviron Bayonnais. They quickly contacted him and his club to formalize his signing with the Basque team.

In July 2015, Zabala joined the second team of Aviron Bayonnais to acclimate to a new team and country. His coaches also decided that Zabala should develop his skills as a tighthead prop, requiring him to adapt to the demands of the new position.

Zabala made his professional debut on 17 December 2016, in a EPCR Challenge Cup match where Aviron Bayonnais faced the Italian team Benetton Rugby Treviso in Italy. The visitors lost 22-17.

In September 2019, he was loaned to Anglet Olympique Rugby Club, a team competing in Fédérale 1, the third tier of rugby in France. In the summer of 2020, he ended his association with Bayonne and began a new chapter with Stado Tarbes, based in Bigorre.

From 2021, Zabala played for AS Béziers Hérault in Pro D2, the second tier of rugby union club competition division in France.

In 2024, after becoming one of the best props in the second tier, Zabala joined Section Paloise, which competes in Top 14.

== National team ==
Zabala participated in the Under-19 European Championship, where Spain won the tournament, scoring one of the tries in the final. In 2017, he was called up by national coach Santiago Santos to face Georgia, making his debut with the Spanish national team, known as the XV del León, by coming on in the second half of a game that ended in a 10-20 loss.
