= Mihai Macovei =

Romania international rugby union player

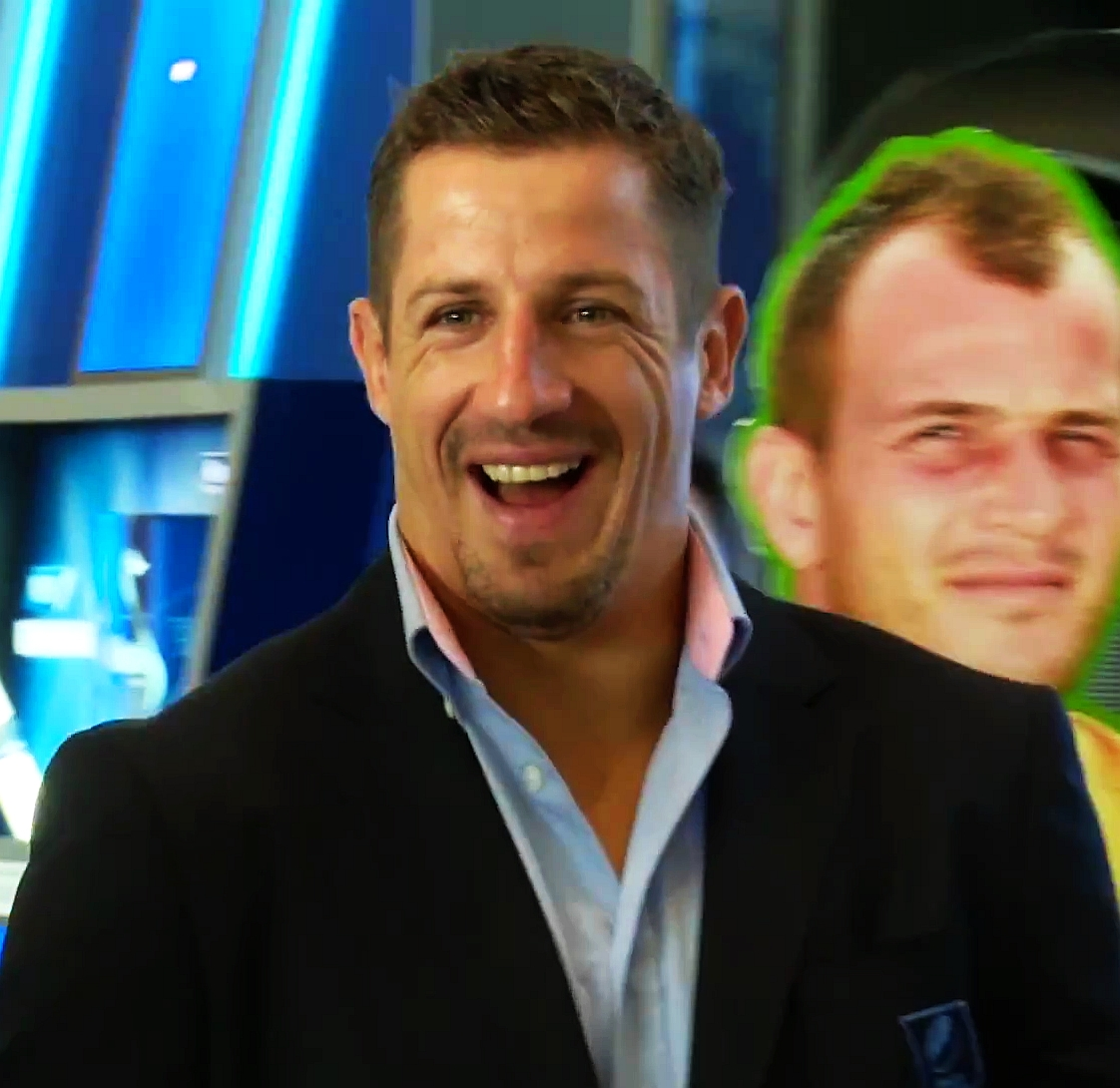
- Macovei representing Romania during the Rugby World Cup
- Born: 29 October 1986 (age 40) Gura Humorului, Romania
- Height: 1.95 m (6 ft 5 in)
- Weight: 108 kg (238 lb; 17 st 0 lb)
- University: Bogdan Vodă University

Rugby union career
- Position(s): Flanker, Number 8
- Current team: Bassin d'Arcachon
Senior career
Years	Team	Apps	(Points)
2005–2012	Știința Baia Mare	28	(0)
2012–2014	Saint-Nazaire	22	(20)
2014–2015	Massy	16	(15)
2015–2023	Colomiers	116	(15)
2023–	Bassin d'Arcachon	0	(0)
- Correct as of 4 August 2023
International career
Years	Team	Apps	(Points)
2006–	Romania	103	(110)
- Correct as of 4 August 2023

Mihai Macovei (born 29 October 1986) is a Romanian professional rugby union player who plays as a flanker for National Division 2 club Bassin d'Arcachon and captains the Romania national team.

== International career ==
He represented Romania in the 2011 Rugby World Cup, and, following the retirement of Marius Țincu, was named captain for the 2015 tournament and has of 2022 captained the Oaks 68 times. He went on to be Romania's star performer in the pool stages, scoring two tries in the Oaks' dramatic comeback victory against Canada.

In 2022 Macovei became the fifth Romanian test centurion, earning his 100th international appearance in the defeat against Samoa in the 2022 autumn internationals.
