= 2017 Rugby Europe Championship =

- Date: 11 February – 18 March 2017
- Countries: Belgium; Georgia; Germany; Romania; Russia; Spain

Tournament statistics
- Champions: Romania (5th title)
- Antim Cup: Romania (6th title)
- Matches played: 15
- Attendance: 114,976 (7,665 per match)
- Tries scored: 79 (5.27 per match)
- Top point scorer(s): (Spain) Brad Linklater (51)
- Top try scorer(s): (Georgia (country)) Giorgi Koshadze (4) (Georgia (country)) Giorgi Tkhilaishvili (4)
- Official website: Rugby International Championship

The 2017 Rugby Europe Championship is the premier rugby union competition outside of the Six Nations Championship in Europe. It is the inaugural Championship under its new format, that saw Belgium, Georgia, Germany, Romania, Russia and Spain compete for the title.

This year's edition of the Rugby Europe Championship also served as the 2019 Rugby World Cup qualifiers for the European region. The team with the best record across the 2017 and 2018 Championships qualifies as Europe 1. As Georgia have already secured qualification automatically, in the event of a Georgian win, the runner-up will take the Europe 1 qualification spot. In respect of matters relating to the eligibility of players, following a full review of the evidence, including statements and submissions from World Rugby, Rugby Europe, Belgium, Romania, Spain and Russia, the independent committee found: Belgium had fielded one or more ineligible players on 7 occasions during the 2017 and 2018 Rugby Europe Championships (of which 6 matches related to Rugby World Cup 2019 qualifying) Romania has fielded one ineligible player on 8 occasions during the 2017 and 2018 Rugby Europe Championships (of which 6 matches related to Rugby World Cup 2019 qualifying) Spain had fielded one or more ineligible players on 9 occasions during the 2017 and 2018 Rugby Europe Championships (of which 8 matches related to Rugby World Cup 2019 qualifying) In respect of the sanctions, pursuant to Regulation 18, the independent committee determined the following: The deduction of 5 points for any match in which a union fielded an ineligible player (40-point deduction for Spain, and a 30-point deduction for both Belgium and Romania). Therefore, based on a re-modelling of the Rugby Europe Championship tables in the context of Rugby World Cup 2019 qualifying, Russia would qualify as Europe 1 into Pool A replacing Romania and Germany will replace Spain in the European play-off against Portugal. As the tournament for 2017 had been completed and issues of relegation had been decided in that year, the points deduction was not applied to the 2017 Rugby Europe tournament.

== Table ==
Champions
Advances to promotion/relegation play-off

Place	Nation	Games				Points			Tries			TBP	LBP	GS	Table points
Place	Nation	Played	Won	Drawn	Lost	For	Against	Diff	For	Against	Diff	TBP	LBP	GS	Table points
4	Romania	5	4	0	1	122	78	+44	16	9	+7	2	1	0	19*
1	Georgia	5	4	0	1	136	44	+92	19	4	+15	2	1	0	19
5	Spain	5	3	0	2	91	54	+37	9	5	+4	1	0	0	13*
2	Russia	5	2	0	3	107	117	–10	14	14	0	1	0	0	9
3	Germany	5	2	0	3	121	201	–80	14	28	−14	0	0	0	8
6	Belgium	5	0	0	5	70	153	–83	7	19	−12	0	2	0	2*
Source- Points were awarded to the teams as follows: Win – 4 points | Draw – 2 points | At least 3 more tries than opponent – 1 point | Loss within 7 points – 1 point | Loss greater than 7 points – 0 points | Completing a Grand Slam – 1 point *As the tournament for 2017 had been completed and issues of relegation had been decided in that year, the points deduction should not be applied to the 2017 Rugby Europe tournament (para 51).

== Fixtures ==
=== Week 1 ===
11 February 2017
13:15 CET (UTC+01)

Germany	41–38	Romania (1 LBP)
Try: Penalty try 34' c Otto 36' c Barber (2) 57' c, 70' c Coetzee 74' c Con: Parkinson (5/5) 34', 37', 57', 71', 75'; Pen: Parkinson (1/2) 7'; Drop: Parkinson (1/1) 18'	Gamesheet	Try: Ursache (2) 19' c, 46' c Umaga 23' c Dumitru (2) 29' c, 49' c Con: Vlaicu (5/5) 20', 24', 30', 47', 50'; Pen: Vlaicu (1/1) 3'

Sparda Bank Hessen Stadium, Offenbach
Attendance: 3,000
Referee: Maxime Chalon (France)

LP	1	Julius Nostadt	(substituted off) 58'
HK	2	Michail Tyumenev	(substituted off) 53'
TP	3	Damien Tussac
LL	4	Eric Marks
RL	5	Michael Poppmeier (c)	(substituted off) 48'
BF	6	Jacobus Otto
OF	7	Sebastian Ferreira
N8	8	Jarrid Els
SH	9	Tim Menzel	(substituted off) 48'
FH	10	Raynor Parkinson
LW	11	Marcel Coetzee
IC	12	Carlo Sotera-Merz	(substituted off) 51'
OC	13	Clemens von Grumbkow
RW	14	Steffen Liebig
FB	15	Harris Aounallah	(substituted off) 57'
Replacements:
HK	16	Dash Barber	(substituted on) 53'
PR	17	Jörn Schröder
PR	18	Samy Füchsel	(substituted on) 58'
N8	19	Timo Vollenkemper	(substituted on) 48'
FL	20	Kehoma Brenner
FH	21	Christopher Hilsenbeck	(substituted on) 57'
SH	22	Sean Armstrong	(substituted on) 48'
CE	23	Jamie Murphy	(substituted on) 51'
Coach:
Jacobus Potgieter

LP	1	Mihăiţă Lazăr (c)
HK	2	Otar Turashvili		(substituted off) 50'
TP	3	Andrei Ursache		(substituted off) 58'
LL	4	Valentin Popârlan
RL	5	Johan van Heerden
BF	6	Viorel Lucaci
OF	7	Vlad Nistor
N8	8	Andrei Gorcioaia		(substituted off) 73'
SH	9	Florin Surugiu		(substituted off) 76'
FH	10	Jody Rose	(yellow card) 17' to 27'
LW	11	Stephen Shennan
IC	12	Florin Vlaicu
OC	13	Jack Umaga
RW	14	Ionuț Dumitru
FB	15	Cătălin Fercu
Replacements:
HK	16	Eugen Căpățână		(substituted on) 50'
PR	17	Constantin Pristăviță
PR	18	Alexandru Țăruș		(substituted on) 58'
LK	19	Ionuț Mureșan
FL	20	Dorin Lazăr
SH	21	Valentin Calafeteanu		(substituted on) 76'
WG	22	Mădălin Lemnaru
WG	23	Luke Samoa		(substituted on) 73'
Coach:
Lynn Howells

Touch judges:
Dely Mathieu (France)
Vallon Alexandre (France)

11 February 2017
15:00 CET (UTC+01)

Belgium	6–31	Georgia (1 TBP)
Pen: Williams 42', 56'	Gamesheet	Try: Tkhilaishvili 21' c Koshadze 37' c Penalty try 75' c Gorgadze 80+10' c Con: Kvirikashvili (3/3) 22', 37', 75'; Malaghuradze (1/1) 80+10'; Pen: Kvirikashvili 12'

King Baudouin Stadium - Annex 2, Brussels
Attendance: 4,000
Referee: Ben Whitehouse (Wales)

LP	1	Lucas Sotteau		(substituted off) 2'
HK	2	Thomas Dienst		(substituted off) 79'
TP	3	Jean-Baptiste de Clercq
LL	4	Brieuc Corradi		(substituted off) 40'
RL	5	Thomas Vervoort		(substituted off) 52'
BF	6	Tom Coupe		29' to 39'
OF	7	Baptiste Lescarboura
N8	8	Thomas Demolder
SH	9	Julien Berger
FH	10	Kevin Williams (c)		(substituted off) 80+1'
LW	11	Charles Reynaert
IC	12	Guillaume Brebant
OC	13	Guillaume Piron
RW	14	Craig Dowsett
FB	15	Nicolas Meeus		(substituted off) 40'
Replacements:
HK	16	Max Dubois		(substituted on) 79'
PR	17	Sep de Backer	(yellow card) 27' to 37'	(substituted on) 2'		(substituted off) 52'
LK	18	Bertrand Billi		(substituted on) 40'
FL	19	Gillian Benoy		(substituted on) 52'
CE	20	Nathan Bontems
SH	21	Tom Cocqu		(substituted on) 80+1'
FH	22	Alan Williams		(substituted on) 40'
PR	23	Christopher Debaty		(substituted on) 29'	(substituted off) 39'	(substituted on) 52'
Coach:
Guillaume Ajac

LP	1	Giorgi Tetrashvili		(substituted off) 52'
HK	2	Badri Alkhazashvili		(substituted off) 80+6'
TP	3	Giorgi Melikidze		(substituted off) 52'
LL	4	Giorgi Nemsadze
RL	5	Nodar Tcheishvili		(substituted off) 52'
BF	6	Lasha Lomidze
OF	7	Giorgi Tkhilaishvili		(substituted off) 80+8'
N8	8	Beka Gorgadze
SH	9	Giorgi Begadze		(substituted off) 80+6'
FH	10	Lasha Khmaladze
LW	11	Alexander Todua
IC	12	Merab Sharikadze		(substituted off) 80+6'
OC	13	Giorgi Koshadze
RW	14	Giorgi Pruidze
FB	15	Merab Kvirikashvili (c)	(yellow card) 51' to 61'	(substituted off) 80+6'
Replacements:
HK	16	Giorgi Chkoidze		(substituted on) 80+6'
PR	17	Tornike Mataradze		(substituted on) 52'
PR	18	Soso Bekoshvili		(substituted on) 52'
FL	19	Otar Giorgadze		(substituted on) 52'
FL	20	Giorgi Tsutskiridze		(substituted on) 80+8'
SH	21	Vazha Khutsishvili		(substituted on) 80+6'
FH	22	Lasha Malaguradze		(substituted on) 80+6'
FB	23	Beka Tsiklauri		(substituted on) 80+6'
Coach:
Milton Haig

Touch judges:
Sean Brickell (Wales)
Stuart Kibble (Wales)

11 February 2017
16:00 CET (UTC+01)

Spain	16–6	Russia
Try: Bélie 7' c Con: Linklater (1/1) 8'; Pen: Linklater 5', 20', 80'	Gamesheet	Pen: Kushnarev 11', 34'

Estadio Nacional Complutense, Madrid, Spain
Attendance: 8,000
Referee: Dudley Phillips (Ireland)

LP	1	Fernando López Pérez	(substituted off) 65'
HK	2	Beñat Auzqui
TP	3	Jesús Moreno Rodríguez	(substituted off) 47'
LL	4	Iñaki Villanueva	(substituted off) 50'
RL	5	David Barrera
BF	6	Pierre Barthère
OF	7	Gautier Gibouin
N8	8	Jaime Nava de Olano (c)
SH	9	Guillaume Rouet
FH	10	Mathieu Bélie
LW	11	Jordi Jorba
IC	12	Dan Snee	(substituted off) 50'
OC	13	Fabien Perrin
RW	14	Sébastien Ascarat
FB	15	Brad Linklater
Replacements:
HK	16	Francisco Blanco Alonso	(substituted on) 65'
PR	17	Unai Lasa Arratibel
LK	18	Jonathan Garcia	(substituted on) 47'
FL	19	Aníbal Bonán	(substituted on) 50'
LK	20	Víctor Sánchez Borrego
SH	21	Sébastien Rouet
WG	22	Thibaut Álvarez	(substituted on) 50'
CE	23	Javier Carrión
Coach:
Santiago Santos

LP	1	Andrei Polivalov
HK	2	Valery Tsnobiladze		(substituted off) 61'
TP	3	Azamat Bitiev		(substituted off) 61'
LL	4	Andrei Garbuzov		(substituted off) 75'
RL	5	Evgeny Elgin
BF	6	Viktor Gresev
OF	7	Pavel Butenko
N8	8	Anton Rudoy	(yellow card) 74' to 80+1'
SH	9	Alexei Shcherban
FH	10	Yuri Kushnarev		(substituted off) 51'
LW	11	Igor Galinovskiy
IC	12	Sergey Trishin
OC	13	Dmitri Gerasimov
RW	14	Vasily Artemyev (c)
FB	15	Ramil Gaisin
Replacements:
HK	16	Nazir Gasanov		(substituted on) 61'
PR	17	Vladimir Podrezov
PR	18	Evgeni Pronenko		(substituted on) 61'
FL	19	Dmitri Krotov		(substituted on) 75'
FL	20	Tagir Gadzhiev
SH	21	Anton Riabov
FH	22	Sergey Sugrobov
FB	23	Igor Kurashov		(substituted on) 51'
Coach:
Alexandr Pervukhin

Touch judges:
Nigel Correll (Ireland)
Richard Kerr (Ireland)

=== Week 2 ===
18 February 2017
13:00 EET (UTC+02)

Romania	13–3	Spain
Try: Florin Vlaicu 15' c Con: Florin Vlaicu (1/1) 16'; Pen: Luke Samoa (0/1); Florin Vlaicu (2/2) 29', 57'; Jack Umaga (0/1)	Gamesheet	Pen: Brad Linklater (1/2) 20'

Stadionul Arcul de Triumf, Bucharest
Attendance: 3,750
Referee: Elia Rizzo (Italy)

LP	1	Mihăiţă Lazăr (c)
HK	2	Otar Turashvili	(substituted off) 64'
TP	3	Andrei Ursache	(substituted off) 67'
LL	4	Valentin Popârlan	(substituted off) 77'
RL	5	Johan van Heerden
BF	6	Viorel Lucaci	(substituted off) 77'
OF	7	Vlad Nistor
N8	8	Dorin Lazăr
SH	9	Florin Surugiu	(substituted off) 64'
FH	10	Luke Samoa
LW	11	Stephen Shennan
IC	12	Florin Vlaicu
OC	13	Jack Umaga
RW	14	Ionuț Dumitru	(substituted off) 70'
FB	15	Cătălin Fercu
Replacements:
HK	16	Eugen Căpățână	(substituted on) 64'
PR	17	Constantin Pristăviță
PR	18	Alexandru Țăruș	(substituted on) 67'
LK	19	Ionuț Mureșan	(substituted on) 77'
FL	20	Andrei Gorcioaia	(substituted on) 77'
SH	21	Valentin Calafeteanu	(substituted on) 64'
WG	22	Mădălin Lemnaru
FH	23	Jody Rose	(substituted on) 70'
Coach:
Lynn Howells

LP	1	Fernando López Pérez	(substituted off) 62'
HK	2	Beñat Auzqui	(substituted off) 73'
TP	3	Jonathan Garcia	(substituted off) 30'
LL	4	Iñaki Villanueva	(substituted off) 62'
RL	5	David Barrera	(substituted off) 58'
BF	6	Pierre Barthère
OF	7	Gautier Gibouin
N8	8	Jaime Nava de Olano (c)
SH	9	Guillaume Rouet	(substituted off) 68'
FH	10	Mathieu Bélie
LW	11	Jordi Jorba
IC	12	Thibaut Álvarez	(substituted off) 52'
OC	13	Fabien Perrin
RW	14	Javier Carrión	(substituted off) 76'
FB	15	Brad Linklater
Replacements:
HK	16	Francisco Blanco Alonso	(substituted on) 62'
PR	17	Stephen Barnes	(substituted on) 73'
PR	18	Alberto Blanco Alonso	(substituted on) 30'
LK	19	David González	(substituted on) 58'
LK	20	Víctor Sánchez Borrego	(substituted on) 62'
SH	21	Sébastien Rouet	(substituted on) 68'
FH	22	Dan Snee	(substituted on) 52'
WG	23	Federico Casteglioni Algorriz	(substituted on) 76'
Coach:
Santiago Santos

Touch judges:
Filippo Bertelli (Italy)
Stefano Roscini (Italy)

18 February 2017
15:00 CET (UTC+01)

(1 LBP) Belgium	18–25	Russia
Try: Muric 36' m Demolder 47' c Con: Williams (1/2) 47'; Pen: Williams (2/3) 5', 62'	Gamesheet	Try: Gresev 3' c Garbuzov 10' m Elgin 80' c Con: Kushnarev (2/3) 3', 80'; Pen: Kushnarev (2/2) 55', 71'

King Baudouin Stadium - Annex 2, Brussels
Attendance: 2,500
Referee: Salem Atallah (France)

LP	1	Martin Bonnel	(substituted off) 41'
HK	2	Thomas Dienst
TP	3	Jean-Baptiste de Clercq	(substituted off) 57'
LL	4	Tuur Moelants	(substituted off) 72'
RL	5	Thomas Vervoort	(substituted off) 50'
BF	6	Gillian Benoy
OF	7	Baptiste Lescarboura
N8	8	Thomas Demolder
SH	9	Tom Cocqu	(substituted off) 70'
FH	10	Julien Berger (c)
LW	11	Ervin Muric
IC	12	Nathan Bontems	(substituted off) 64'
OC	13	Jens Torfs
RW	14	Charles Reynaert
FB	15	Alan Williams
Replacements:
HK	16	Max Dubois
PR	17	Christopher Debaty	(substituted on) 57'
FL	18	Amin Hamzaoui
FL	19	Paul van Laer	(substituted on) 50'
CE	20	Louis Debatty	(substituted on) 72'
FH	21	Kevin Williams	(substituted on) 70'
CE	22	Guillaume Brebant	(substituted on) 64'
PR	23	Sep de Backer	(substituted on) 41'
Coach:
Guillaume Ajac

LP	1	Andrei Polivalov	(substituted off) 74'
HK	2	Valery Tsnobiladze	(substituted off) 59'
TP	3	Evgeni Pronenko	(substituted off) 49'
LL	4	Andrei Garbuzov (c)
RL	5	Evgeny Elgin
BF	6	Viktor Gresev
OF	7	Pavel Butenko	(substituted off) 59'
N8	8	Anton Rudoy
SH	9	Alexei Shcherban
FH	10	Yuri Kushnarev
LW	11	Igor Galinovskiy	(substituted off) 75'
IC	12	Sergey Sugrobov
OC	13	Dmitri Gerasimov
RW	14	Igor Kurashov
FB	15	Ramil Gaisin
Replacements:
HK	16	Nazir Gasanov	(substituted on) 59'
PR	17	Vladimir Podrezov	(substituted on) 74'
PR	18	Azamat Bitiev	(substituted on) 49'
FL	19	Dmitri Krotov	(substituted on) 59'
FL	20	Bogdan Fedotko
SH	21	Anton Riabov
FH	22	Alexei Mikhaltsov	(substituted on) 75'
FB	23	Konstantin Uzunov
Coach:
Alexandr Pervukhin

Touch judges:
Nicolas Datas (France)
Bruno Gabaldon (France)

19 February 2017
15:00 GET (UTC+04)

(1 TBP) Georgia	50–6	Germany
Try: Koshadze (2) 3' c, 27' c Pruidze 17' c Tkhilaishvili (2) 47' m, 68' c Gorgadze (2) 56' m, 64' m Sharikadze 80' c Con: Kvirikashvili (4/7) 4', 18', 28', 69'; Koshadze (1/1) 80+1'	Gamesheet	Pen: Parkinson (2/3) 8', 24'

Rustavi Rugby Stadium, Rustavi
Attendance: 3,300
Referee: Max Burlet (Belgium)

LP	1	Tornike Mataradze	(yellow card) 72' to 80+1'
HK	2	Badri Alkhazashvili		(substituted off) 30'
TP	3	Soso Bekoshvili		(substituted off) 54'
LL	4	Giorgi Nemsadze		(substituted off) 68'
RL	5	Nodar Tcheishvili		(substituted off) 57'
BF	6	Lasha Lomidze
OF	7	Giorgi Tkhilaishvili
N8	8	Beka Gorgadze
SH	9	Giorgi Begadze		(substituted off) 57'
FH	10	Revaz Jinchvelashvili
LW	11	Alexander Todua
IC	12	Merab Sharikadze (c)
OC	13	Giorgi Koshadze
RW	14	Giorgi Pruidze
FB	15	Merab Kvirikashvili		(substituted off) 78'
Replacements:
HK	16	Giorgi Chkoidze		(substituted on) 30'	(substituted off) 48'
PR	17	Giorgi Tetrashvili			(substituted on) 48'
PR	18	Lasha Tabidze		(substituted on) 54'
LK	19	Giorgi Mchedlishvili		(substituted on) 68'
FL	20	Saba Shubitidze		(substituted on) 57'
SH	21	Gela Aprasidze		(substituted on) 57'	(substituted off) 62'
FH	22	Lasha Khmaladze		(substituted on) 78'
FH	23	Lasha Malaguradze			(substituted on) 62'
Coach:
Milton Haig

LP	1	Julius Nostadt	(substituted off) 22'
HK	2	Dash Barber	(substituted off) 65'
TP	3	Samy Füchsel	(substituted off) 77'
LL	4	Robert May	(substituted off) 60'
RL	5	Eric Marks (c)
BF	6	Tom Behrendt	(substituted off) 50'
OF	7	Sebastian Ferreira
N8	8	Timo Vollenkemper
SH	9	Sean Armstrong (c)
FH	10	Raynor Parkinson
LW	11	Alistair Ledingham	(substituted off) 50'
IC	12	Jamie Murphy
OC	13	Marcel Coetzee
RW	14	Oliver Paine	(substituted off) 68'
FB	15	Harris Aounallah
Replacements:
HK	16	Dale Garner	(substituted on) 65'
PR	17	Jörn Schröder	(substituted on) 22'
PR	18	Anthony Dickinson	(substituted on) 77'
LK	19	Sven van Niekerk	(substituted on) 60'
FL	20	Jarrid Els	(substituted on) 50'
WG	21	Mark Sztyndera	(substituted on) 68'
FH	22	Daniel Koch
CE	23	Mathieu Docau	(substituted on) 50'
Coach:
Jacobus Potgieter

Touch judges:
John Catteau (Belgium)
Kevin Sulejmani (Belgium)

=== Week 3 ===
4 March 2017
13:00 MSK (UTC+03)

Russia	10–30	Romania (1 TBP)
Try: Morozov 79' c Con: Kushnarev (1/1) 79'; Pen: Kushnarev 40'	Gamesheet	Try: Badiu 6' c Lemnaru 26' c Popârlan 69' m Rose 80' m Con: Vlaicu (2/2) 8', 27'; Pen: Calafeteanu 45', 47'

Slava Metreveli Central Stadium, Sochi
Attendance: 2,000
Referee: Sean Gallagher (Ireland)

LP	1	Andrei Polivalov	(substituted off) 60'
HK	2	Valery Tsnobiladze	(substituted off) 60'
TP	3	Innokentiy Zykov	(substituted off) 71'
LL	4	Bogdan Fedotko	(substituted off) 54'
RL	5	Evgeny Elgin	(substituted off) 64'
BF	6	Viktor Gresev
OF	7	Pavel Butenko
N8	8	Anton Rudoy
SH	9	Alexei Shcherban	(substituted off) 60'
FH	10	Ramil Gaisin
LW	11	Denis Simplikevich
IC	12	Dmitri Gerasimov
OC	13	Vasily Artemyev (c)
RW	14	Igor Galinovskiy
FB	15	Yuri Kushnarev
Replacements:
HK	16	Nazir Gasanov	(substituted on) 60'
PR	17	Valery Morozov	(substituted on) 60'
PR	18	Azamat Bitiev	(substituted on) 55'
FL	19	Dmitri Krotov	(substituted on) 64'
FL	20	Andrei Temnov	(substituted on) 71'
FB	21	Konstantin Uzunov	(substituted on) 60'
FH	22	Alexei Mikhaltsov
FB	23	Igor Kurashov
Coach:
Alexandr Pervukhin

LP	1	Ionel Badiu		(substituted off) 46'
HK	2	Otar Turashvili		(substituted off) 71'
TP	3	Alexandru Țăruș		(substituted off) 52'
LL	4	Marius Antonescu		(substituted off) 61'
RL	5	Johan van Heerden
BF	6	Mihai Macovei (c)
OF	7	Vlad Nistor
N8	8	Andrei Gorcioaia
SH	9	Valentin Calafeteanu
FH	10	Florin Vlaicu		(substituted off) 40'
LW	11	Mădălin Lemnaru
IC	12	Sione Faka'osilea
OC	13	Jack Umaga
RW	14	Ionuț Dumitru		(substituted off) 77'
FB	15	Cătălin Fercu
Replacements:
HK	16	Eugen Căpățână		(substituted on) 71'
PR	17	Constantin Pristăviță		(substituted on) 46'
PR	18	Alex Gordaș		(substituted on) 52'
LK	19	Valentin Popârlan		(substituted on) 61'
LK	20	Ionuț Mureșan
SH	21	Florin Surugiu
FH	22	Jody Rose	(yellow card) 64' to 74'	(substituted on) 40'
WG	23	Stephen Shennan		(substituted on) 77'
Coach:
Lynn Howells

Touch judges:
Kieran Barry (Ireland)
Karol Collins (Ireland)

4 March 2017
16:00 CET (UTC+01)

Spain	10–20	Georgia
Try: Gavidi 22' c Con: Linklater (1/1) 23'; Pen: Linklater 2'	Gamesheet	Try: Tkhilaishvili 49' c Matiashvili 57' c Con: Kvirikashvili (2/2) 50', 58'; Pen: Kvirikashvili 20', 78'

Estadio Municipal, Medina del Campo
Attendance: 7,000
Referee: Craig Evans (Wales)

LP	1	Fernando López Pérez		(substituted off) 41'
HK	2	Stephen Barnes		(substituted off) 41'
TP	3	Alberto Blanco Alonso		(substituted off) 41'		(substituted on) 76'	(substituted off) 79'
LL	4	Ilaitia Gavidi		54' to 60'		76' to 79'
RL	5	Víctor Sánchez Borrego				(substituted off) 61'
BF	6	Iñaki Villanueva
OF	7	Javier Canosa Schack		(substituted off) 46'
N8	8	Gautier Gibouin (c)
SH	9	Sébastien Rouet		(substituted off) 61'
FH	10	Mathieu Bélie		(substituted off) 52'
LW	11	Jordi Jorba
IC	12	Thibaut Álvarez
OC	13	Dan Snee
RW	14	Federico Casteglioni Algorriz		(substituted off) 69'
FB	15	Brad Linklater
Replacements:
HK	16	Francisco de Blanco Alonso		(substituted on) 41'
PR	17	Beñat Auzqui		(substituted on) 41'
PR	18	Jon Zabala Arrieta	(yellow card) 69' to 79'	(substituted on) 41'
LK	19	Lucas Guillaume		(substituted on) 54'	(substituted off) 60'	(substituted on) 61'
N8	20	Matthew Foulds		(substituted on) 46'
SH	21	Juan Ramos Martín		(substituted on) 61'
CE	22	Alvar Gimeno Soria		(substituted on) 52'
CE	23	Gauthier Minguillon		(substituted on) 69'
Coach:
Santiago Santos

LP	1	Giorgi Tetrashvili	(substituted off) 52'
HK	2	Shalva Mamukashvili	(substituted off) 52'
TP	3	Soso Bekoshvili	(substituted off) 58'
LL	4	Giorgi Nemsadze
RL	5	Konstantin Mikautadze	(substituted off) 75'
BF	6	Otar Giorgadze	(substituted off) 55'
OF	7	Giorgi Tkhilaishvili
N8	8	Lasha Lomidze
SH	9	Vasil Lobzhanidze	(substituted off) 59'
FH	10	Lasha Khmaladze
LW	11	Alexander Todua	(substituted off) 76'
IC	12	Merab Sharikadze (c)	(substituted off) 17'
OC	13	David Kacharava
RW	14	Soso Matiashvili
FB	15	Merab Kvirikashvili
Replacements:
HK	16	Jaba Bregvadze	(substituted on) 52'
PR	17	Tornike Mataradze	(substituted on) 52'
PR	18	Lasha Tabidze	(substituted on) 58'
FL	19	Giorgi Tsutskiridze	(substituted on) 55'
FL	20	Saba Shubitidze	(substituted on) 75'
SH	21	Giorgi Begadze	(substituted on) 59'
CE	22	Badri Liparteliani	(substituted on) 17'
FB	23	Beka Tsiklauri	(substituted on) 76'
Coach:
Milton Haig

Touch judges:
Wayne Davies (Wales)
Justin Williams (Wales)

4 March 2017
16:15 CET (UTC+01)

Germany	34–29	Belgium (1 LBP)
Try: Otto 6' c Els 33' c Armstrong 45' c Murphy 67' c Con: Parkinson (4/4) 6', 34', 46', 67'; Pen: Parkinson (2/2) 9', 15'	Gamesheet	Try: Williams 52' c Pearce 60' m Muric 77' m Con: Williams (1/3) 53'; Pen: Williams (4/4) 3', 20', 65', 80+1'

Sparda Bank Hessen Stadium, Offenbach
Attendance: 4,126
Referee: Iñigo Atorrasagasti (Spain)

LP	1	Julius Nostadt		(substituted off) 78'
HK	2	Dash Barber		(substituted off) 53'
TP	3	Samy Füchsel		(substituted off) 78'
LL	4	Eric Marks
RL	5	Robert May		(substituted off) 53'
BF	6	Jacobus Otto
OF	7	Sebastian Ferreira
N8	8	Jarrid Els
SH	9	Sean Armstrong (c)		(substituted off) 70'
FH	10	Raynor Parkinson	(yellow card) 76' to 80+1'
LW	11	Pierre Mathurin		(substituted off) 20'
IC	12	Clemens von Grumbkow
OC	13	Marcel Coetzee
RW	14	Steffen Liebig
FB	15	Harris Aounallah
Replacements:
HK	16	Michail Tyumenev		(substituted on) 53'
PR	17	Jörn Schröder		(substituted on) 78'
PR	18	Christopher Howells		(substituted on) 78'
N8	19	Timo Vollenkemper
FL	20	Kehoma Brenner		(substituted on) 53'
SH	21	Tim Menzel		(substituted on) 70'
CE	22	Oliver Paine
CE	23	Jamie Murphy		(substituted on) 20'
Coach:
Jacobus Potgieter

LP	1	Sep de Backer (c)	(substituted off) 53'
HK	2	Max Dubois	(substituted off) 43'
TP	3	Jean-Baptiste de Clercq	(substituted off) 55'
LL	4	Tuur Moelants
RL	5	Thomas Vervoort
BF	6	Gillian Benoy	(substituted off) 43'
OF	7	Baptiste Lescarboura	(substituted off) 43'
N8	8	Thomas Demolder
SH	9	Julien Berger
FH	10	Alan Williams
LW	11	Ervin Muric	(substituted off) 68'
IC	12	Nathan Bontems	(substituted off) 21'
OC	13	Jens Torfs
RW	14	Louis Debatty	(substituted off) 47'
FB	15	Charles Reynaert
Replacements:
HK	16	Thomas Dienst	(substituted on) 43'
PR	17	Christopher Debaty	(substituted on) 55'
LK	18	Bertrand Billi	(substituted on) 43'
FL	19	Paul van Laer	(substituted on) 43'
CE	20	Guillaume Brebant	(substituted on) 68'
SH	21	Tom Cocqu	(substituted on) 21'
WG	22	Kevin Williams	(substituted on) 47'
PR	23	James Pearce	(substituted on) 53'
Coach:
Guillaume Ajac

Touch judges:
Jorge Molpeceres (Spain)
Marc Riera (Spain)

=== Week 4 ===
11 March 2017
15:00 CET (UTC+01)

Belgium	17–33	Romania (1 TBP)
Try: Reynaert 42' c De Clercq 54' c Con: Williams (2/2) 43', 55'; Pen: Williams 66'	Gamesheet	Try: Cobden (2) 9' c, 20' c Lucaci 49' c Gordaș 71' c Vlaicu 77' m Con: Vlaicu (4/5) 10', 21', 51', 82'

King Baudouin Stadium - Annex 2, Brussels
Attendance: 3,000
Referee: Claudio Biessano (Italy)

LP	1	Sep de Backer	(substituted off) 40'
HK	2	Thomas Dienst	(substituted off) 61'
TP	3	Jean-Baptiste de Clercq	(substituted off) 61'
LL	4	Tuur Moelants
RL	5	Clement Veeckman	(substituted off) 45'
BF	6	Gillian Benoy
OF	7	Bertrand Billi
N8	8	Brieuc Corradi	(substituted off) 73'
SH	9	Tom Cocqu
FH	10	Kevin Williams
LW	11	Craig Dowsett	(substituted off) 52'
IC	12	Nathan Bontems
OC	13	Jens Torfs (c)	(substituted off) 76'
RW	14	Charles Reynaert
FB	15	Alan Williams
Replacements:
HK	16	Max Dubois	(substituted on) 61'
PR	17	Christopher Debaty	(substituted on) 61'
LK	18	Sven d'Hooghe	(substituted on) 73'
FL	19	Baptiste Lescarboura	(substituted on) 45'
CE	20	Hendrik Brouwers
FB	21	Nicolas Meeus	(substituted on) 52'
FB	22	Florian Piron	(substituted on) 76'
PR	23	Julien Massimi	(substituted on) 40'
Coach:
Guillaume Ajac

LP	1	Ionel Badiu
HK	2	Eugen Căpățână	(substituted off) 78'
TP	3	Alexandru Țăruș	(substituted off) 56'
LL	4	Johan van Heerden
RL	5	Marius Antonescu	(substituted off) 60'
BF	6	Viorel Lucaci	(substituted off) 70'
OF	7	Mihai Macovei (c)
N8	8	Andrei Gorcioaia
SH	9	Valentin Calafeteanu	(substituted off) 78'
FH	10	Florin Vlaicu	(substituted off) 78'
LW	11	Jack Cobden
IC	12	Sione Faka'osilea
OC	13	Jack Umaga
RW	14	Mădălin Lemnaru	(substituted off) 70'
FB	15	Cătălin Fercu
Replacements:
HK	16	Andrei Radoi	(substituted on) 78'
PR	17	Constantin Pristăviță
PR	18	Alex Gordaș	(substituted on) 56'
LK	19	Valentin Popârlan	(substituted on) 60'
LK	20	Dorin Lazăr	(substituted on) 70'
SH	21	Florin Surugiu	(substituted on) 78'
FH	22	Jody Rose	(substituted on) 78'
WG	23	Stephen Shennan	(substituted on) 70'
Coach:
Lynn Howells

Touch judges:
Stefano Bolzonella (Italy)
Francis Giacomini (Italy)

11 March 2017
16:15 CET (UTC+01)

Germany	15–32	Spain
Try: Otto 54' m Marks 66' c Con: Parkinson (1/2) 67'; Pen: Parkinson (1/2) 10'	Gamesheet	Try: Linklater 4' c Casteglioni Algorriz 26' c Jorba 36' m Rouet 39' c Con: Linklater (3/4) 5', 26', 40'; Pen: Linklater (2/3) 13', 62'

Sportpark Höhenberg, Köln
Attendance: 4,500
Referee: Lloyd Linton (Scotland)

LP	1	Julius Nostadt		(substituted off) 76'
HK	2	Michail Tyumenev		(substituted off) 44'
TP	3	Samy Füchsel
LL	4	Eric Marks
RL	5	Timo Vollenkemper		(substituted off) 44'
BF	6	Jacobus Otto
OF	7	Sebastian Ferreira
N8	8	Jarrid Els
SH	9	Sean Armstrong (c)		(substituted off) 22'
FH	10	Raynor Parkinson
LW	11	Pierre Mathurin
IC	12	Jamie Murphy
OC	13	Marcel Coetzee	(yellow card) 54' to 64'
RW	14	Bastian Himmer		(substituted off) 69'
FB	15	Harris Aounallah
Replacements:
PR	16	Jörn Schröder		(substituted on) 76'
PR	17	Christopher Howells
LK	18	Robert May
HK	19	Dash Barber		(substituted on) 44'
FL	20	Kehoma Brenner		(substituted on) 44'
SH	21	Tim Menzel		(substituted on) 22'
CE	22	Oliver Paine			(substituted on) 76'
CE	23	Rafael Pyrasch		(substituted on) 69'	(substituted off) 76'
Coach:
Jacobus Potgieter

LP	1	Beñat Auzqui		(substituted off) 71'
HK	2	Marco Pinto Ferrer	(yellow card) 54' to 64'	(substituted off) 71'
TP	3	Jesús Moreno Rodríguez		(substituted off) 56'
LL	4	David Barrera
RL	5	Iñaki Villanueva		(substituted off) 56'
BF	6	Pierre Barthère		58' to 65'		(substituted off) 71'
OF	7	Gautier Gibouin
N8	8	Jaime Nava de Olano (c)
SH	9	Guillaume Rouet		(substituted off) 71'
FH	10	Mathieu Bélie		(substituted off) 76'
LW	11	Jordi Jorba
IC	12	Dan Snee
OC	13	Fabien Perrin		(substituted off) 41'
RW	14	Federico Casteglioni Algorriz
FB	15	Brad Linklater
Replacements:
PR	16	Fernando López Pérez		(substituted on) 58'	(substituted off) 65'	(substituted on) 71'
HK	17	Juan Anaya Lazaro		(substituted on) 71'
PR	18	Alberto Blanco Alonso		(substituted on) 56'
LK	19	David González		(substituted on) 71'
FL	20	Aníbal Bonán		(substituted on) 56'
SH	21	Sébastien Rouet		(substituted on) 71'
CE	22	Thibaut Álvarez		(substituted on) 41'
CE	23	Alvar Gimeno Soria		(substituted on) 76'
Coach:
Santiago Santos

Touch judges:
Greame Ormiston (Scotland)
Bob Nevins (Scotland)

12 March 2017
18:00 GET (UTC+04)

Georgia	28–14	Russia
Try: Koshadze 3' c Lobzhanidze (2) 26' c, 48' c Kacharava 65' c Con: Kvirikashvili (4/4) 3', 26', 48', 65	Gamesheet	Try: Gaisin 55' c Fedotko 75' c Con: Kushnarev (2/2) 56', 76'

Dinamo Arena, Tbilisi
Attendance: 52,000
Referee: Ian Tempest (England)

LP	1	Mikheil Nariashvili	(substituted off) 67'
HK	2	Jaba Bregvadze	(substituted off) 67'
TP	3	Lasha Tabidze	(substituted off) 43'
LL	4	Giorgi Nemsadze
RL	5	Konstantin Mikautadze	(substituted off) 57'
BF	6	Giorgi Tsutskiridze	(substituted off) 69'
OF	7	Mamuka Gorgodze (c)
N8	8	Beka Gorgadze
SH	9	Vasil Lobzhanidze	(substituted off) 73'
FH	10	Lasha Khmaladze
LW	11	Alexander Todua
IC	12	Davit Kacharava
OC	13	Giorgi Koshadze
RW	14	Irakli Svanidze
FB	15	Merab Kvirikashvili
Replacements:
HK	16	Zurab Zhvania	(substituted on) 67'
PR	17	Giorgi Tetrashvili	(substituted on) 67'
PR	18	Soso Bekoshvili	(substituted on) 43'
FL	19	Lasha Lomidze	(substituted on) 57'
FL	20	Saba Shubitidze	(substituted on) 69'
SH	21	Gela Aprasidze	(substituted on) 73'
FH	22	Revaz Jinchvelashvili
FB	23	Beka Tsiklauri
Coach:
Milton Haig

LP	1	Valery Morozov	(yellow card) 15' to 26'		(substituted off) 26'
HK	2	Nazir Gasanov		(substituted off) 68'
TP	3	Azamat Bitiev
LL	4	Evgeny Elgin
RL	5	Innokentiy Zykov		(substituted off) 68'
BF	6	Viktor Gresev
OF	7	Tagir Gadzhiev		(substituted off) 15'	(substituted on) 26'
N8	8	Pavel Butenko
SH	9	Konstantin Uzunov
FH	10	Ramil Gaisin
LW	11	Denis Simplikevich
IC	12	Vasily Artemyev (c)
OC	13	Dmitri Gerasimov		(substituted off) 58'
RW	14	Igor Kurashov		(substituted off) 69'
FB	15	Yuri Kushnarev
Replacements:
PR	16	Sergey Chernyshev		(substituted on) 68'
PR	17	Vladimir Podrezov
PR	18	Evgeni Pronenko		(substituted on) 68'
FL	19	Bogdan Fedotko		(substituted on) 15'
FL	20	Dmitri Gritsenko		(substituted on) 58'
SH	21	Anton Riabov
FH	22	Alexei Mikhaltsov		(substituted on) 69'
CE	23	Evgeni Kolomiytsev
Coach:
Alexandr Pervukhin

Touch judges:
Steve Lee (England)
Nigel Carric (England)

=== Week 5 ===
18 March 2017
15:45 CET (UTC+01)

(1 TBP) Spain	30–0	Belgium
Try: Villanueva 10' c Perrin 17' c Gavidi 75' c Con: Linklater (3/3) 11', 18', 75'; Pen: Linklater 2', 28', 78'	Gamesheet

Estadio Nacional Complutense, Madrid, Spain
Attendance: 7,800
Referee: Vlad Iordăchescu (Romania)

LP	1	Beñat Auzqui		(substituted off) 59'	(substituted on) 80'
HK	2	Marco Pinto Ferrer		(substituted off) 62'
TP	3	Jesús Moreno Rodríguez	(red card) 44'
LL	4	David Barrera
RL	5	Iñaki Villanueva		(substituted off) 57'
BF	6	Pierre Barthère		(substituted off) 48'
OF	7	Gautier Gibouin
N8	8	Jaime Nava de Olano (c)		(substituted off) 70'
SH	9	Guillaume Rouet		(substituted off) 77'
FH	10	Mathieu Bélie		(substituted off) 48'
LW	11	Jordi Jorba
IC	12	Dan Snee
OC	13	Fabien Perrin	(yellow card) 45' to 55'	(substituted off) 72'
RW	14	Federico Casteglioni Algorriz
FB	15	Brad Linklater
Replacements:
PR	16	Fernando López Pérez		(substituted on) 59'
HK	17	Juan Anaya Lazaro		(substituted on) 62'
PR	18	Alberto Blanco Alonso		(substituted on) 48'	(substituted off) 80'
FL	19	Aníbal Bonán		(substituted on) 70'
LK	20	Ilaitia Gavidi		(substituted on) 57'
SH	21	Sébastien Rouet		(substituted on) 77'
CE	22	Thibaut Álvarez	(yellow card) 76' to 80+6'	(substituted on) 48'
CE	23	Alvar Gimeno Soria		(substituted on) 72'
Coach:
Santiago Santos

LP	1	Julien Massimi		(substituted off) 41'
HK	2	Thomas Dienst		(substituted off) 53'
TP	3	Jean-Baptiste de Clercq		(substituted off) 65'
LL	4	Clement Veeckman		(substituted off) 37'
RL	5	Thomas Vervoort		(substituted off) 70'	(substituted on) 80+1'
BF	6	Bertrad Billi		(substituted off) 41'
OF	7	Baptiste Lescarboura
N8	8	Thomas Demolder
SH	9	Tom Cocqu		(substituted off) 64'
FH	10	Kevin Williams		(substituted off) 57'
LW	11	Craig Dowsett	(yellow card) 76' to 80+6'
IC	12	Guillaume Piron
OC	13	Jens Torfs (c)
RW	14	Charles Reynaert
FB	15	Alan Williams
Replacements:
HK	16	Max Dubois		(substituted on) 53'
PR	17	Christopher Debaty		(substituted on) 41'
LK	18	Tuur Moelants		(substituted on) 37'	(substituted off) 80+1'
FL	19	Gillian Benoy		(substituted on) 41'
LK	20	Sven d'Hooghe		(substituted on) 70'
CE	21	Isaac Montoisy		(substituted on) 64'
SH	22	Nathan Bontems		(substituted on) 57'
PR	23	Maxime Jadot		(substituted on) 65'
Coach:
Guillaume Ajac

Touch judges:
Radu Petrescu (Romania)
Alexandru Ionescu (Romania)

19 March 2017
14:00 MSK (UTC+03)

(1 TBP) Russia	52–25	Germany
Try: Gaisin 3' c Simplikevich 31' m Gerasimov (2) 41' c, 72' c Elgin 57' c Artemyev 64' c Krotov 67' m Mikhaltsov 75' c Con: Kushnarev (5/6) 4', 42', 58', 72', 76'; Gaisin (1/2) 65'	Gamesheet	Try: Parkinson 11' c Mathurin (2) 60' c, 80+3' m Con: Parkinson (1/1) 12'; Hilsenbeck (1/2) 61'; Pen: Parkinson (0/1); Hilsenbeck (2/2) 47', 54'

Slava Metreveli Central Stadium, Sochi
Attendance: 2,500
Referee: Cedric Marchat (France)

LP	1	Adrei Polivalov		39' to 41'		(substituted off) 50'
HK	2	Valery Tsnobiladze		(substituted off) 61'
TP	3	Innokentiy Zykov		(substituted off) 50'	(substituted on) 53'
LL	4	Bogdan Fedotko		(substituted off) 67'
RL	5	Evgeny Elgin
BF	6	Viktor Gresev
OF	7	Dmitri Krotov			(substituted off) 53'
N8	8	Anton Rudoi		(substituted off) 50'
SH	9	Konstantin Uzunov		(substituted off) 54'
FH	10	Ramil Gaisin
LW	11	Vasily Artemyev (c)
IC	12	Igor Galinovskiy		(substituted off) 73'
OC	13	Dmitri Gerasimov
RW	14	Denis Simplikevich		(substituted off) 70'
FB	15	Yuri Kushnarev	(yellow card) 59' to 69'
Replacements:
PR	16	Nazir Gasanov		(substituted on) 61'
PR	17	Vladimir Podrezov		(substituted on) 39'	(substituted off) 41'	(substituted on) 50'
PR	18	Azamat Bitiev		(substituted on) 50'
N8	19	Pavel Butenko	(yellow card) 50' to 60'	(substituted on) 50'
FL	20	Tagir Gadzhiev		(substituted on) 67'
SH	21	Alexei Shcherban		(substituted on) 54'
CE	22	Sergey Trishin		(substituted on) 73'
FH	23	Alexei Mikhaltsov		(substituted on) 70'
Coach:
Alexandr Pervukhin

LP	1	Julius Nostadt	(substituted off) 61'
HK	2	Dash Barber	(substituted off) 46'
TP	3	Samy Füchsel	(substituted off) 76'
LL	4	Eric Marks (c)
RL	5	Sebastian Ferreira	(substituted off) 67'
BF	6	Jacobus Otto
OF	7	Kehoma Brenner	(substituted off) 51'
N8	8	Jarrid Els
SH	9	Tim Menzel	(substituted off) 58'
FH	10	Christopher Hilsenbeck
LW	11	Pierre Mathurin
IC	12	Raynor Parkinson
OC	13	Marcel Coetzee	(substituted off) 66'
RW	14	Bastian Himmer	(substituted off) 40'
FB	15	Harris Aounallah
Replacements:
PR	16	Jörn Schröder	(substituted on) 61'
PR	17	Anthony Dickinson	(substituted on) 76'
N8	18	Timo Vollenkemper	(substituted on) 67'
HK	19	Michail Tyumenev	(substituted on) 46'
FL	20	Thore Schmidt	(substituted on) 51'
SH	21	Sean Armstrong	(substituted on) 58'
CE	22	Oliver Paine	(substituted on) 66'
CE	23	Jamie Murphy	(substituted on) 40'
Coach:
Jacobus Potgieter

Touch judges:
Thomas Charabas (France)
Thomas Dejean (France)

19 March 2017
15:00 EET (UTC+02)

Romania	8–7	Georgia (1 LBP)
Try: Fercu 3' m Pen: Vlaicu (1/3) 53'	Gamesheet	Try: Sharikadze 40' c Con: Kvirikashvili (1/1) 40'

Stadionul Arcul de Triumf, Bucharest
Attendance: 7,500
Referee: Ian Davies (Wales)

LP	1	Ionel Badiu	(substituted off) 63'
HK	2	Otar Turashvili	(substituted off) 63'
TP	3	Alexandru Țăruș	(substituted off) 51'	(substituted on) 70'
LL	4	Johan van Heerden
RL	5	Marius Antonescu
BF	6	Viorel Lucaci			(substituted off) 71'
OF	7	Andrei Gorcioaia
N8	8	Mihai Macovei (c)	40' to 41'		(substituted off) 74'
SH	9	Florin Surugiu	(substituted off) 70'
FH	10	Florin Vlaicu
LW	11	Ionuț Dumitru
IC	12	Sione Faka'osilea
OC	13	Jack Umaga
RW	14	Stephen Shennan	(substituted off) 60'
FB	15	Cătălin Fercu
Replacements:
HK	16	Eugen Căpățână	(substituted on) 63'
PR	17	Constantin Pristăviță	(substituted on) 63'
PR	18	Alex Gordaș	(substituted on) 51'	(substituted off) 70'
LK	19	Valentin Popârlan			(substituted on) 74'
LK	20	Dorin Lazăr	(substituted on) 40'	(substituted off) 41'	(substituted on) 71'
SH	21	Valentin Calafeteanu	(substituted on) 70'
FH	22	Jody Rose
WG	23	Mădălin Lemnaru	(substituted on) 60'
Coach:
Lynn Howells

LP	1	Mikheil Nariashvili
HK	2	Jaba Bregvadze	(substituted off) 63'
TP	3	Soso Bekoshvili	(substituted off) 47'
LL	4	Giorgi Nemsadze	(substituted off) 5'
RL	5	Konstantin Mikautadze
BF	6	Giorgi Tkhilaishvili
OF	7	Mamuka Gorgodze (c)	(substituted off) 71'
N8	8	Beka Gorgadze
SH	9	Vasil Lobzhanidze	(substituted off) 70'
FH	10	Lasha Khmaladze
LW	11	Alexander Todua
IC	12	Merab Sharikadze
OC	13	Davit Kacharava
RW	14	Irakli Svanidze	(substituted off) 65'
FB	15	Merab Kvirikashvili
Replacements:
HK	16	Zurab Zhvania	(substituted on) 63'
PR	17	Tornike Mataradze
PR	18	Lasha Tabidze	(substituted on) 47'
FL	19	Lasha Lomidze	(substituted on) 5'
FL	20	Giorgi Tsutskiridze	(substituted on) 71'
SH	21	Giorgi Begadze	(substituted on) 70'
FH	22	Lasha Malaguradze
CE	23	Giorgi Koshadze	(substituted on) 65'
Coach:
Milton Haig

Touch judges:
Sean Brickell (Wales)
Wayne Davies (Wales)

== Relegation/promotion play-off ==
20 May 2017
16:00 CEST (UTC+02)

Belgium	29–18	Portugal

King Baudouin Stadium - Annex 2, Brussels

== See also ==
- Rugby Europe International Championships
- 2016–17 Rugby Europe International Championships
- Six Nations Championship
- Antim Cup
