= 2014–2016 European Nations Cup First Division =

2014–16 European Nations Cup
- Date: Autumn 2014 – Spring 2016
- Countries: Division 1A: Georgia; Germany; Portugal; Romania; Russia; Spain; Division 1B: Belgium; Moldova; Netherlands; Poland; Sweden; Ukraine

Tournament statistics
- Champions: Georgia (2015, 2016)
- Top point scorers: Division 1A: (Georgia (country)) Merab Kvirikashvili(64 points) Division 1B: (Belgium) Baptiste Lescarboura (55 points)
- Top try scorers: Division 1A: (Georgia (country)) Zurab Zhvania (5 tries) Division 1B: (Belgium) Baptiste Lescarboura (11 tries)

The 2014–16 European Nations Cup First Division is the premier rugby union competition below the Six Nations Championship in Europe. It is divided into two tiers; Division 1A and Division 1B.

The divisions play on a two-year cycle with the teams playing each other both home and away. From 2009 onward, the title is awarded according to a one-year ranking.

The competition has been slightly altered for the 2014–16 edition. The top tier Division 1A has seen the relegation of Belgium to Division 1B. They have been replaced with Germany, who finished at the top of Division 1B in the 2012–14 season. The bottom tier division 1B has seen the relegation of the Czech Republic to the European Nations Cup Second Division. They have been replaced by Netherlands who won promotion from Division 2A.

The champions of Division 1B will be promoted to Division 1A for the 2017–18 season, while the last placed team in each division will be relegated.

== Format ==
Table points are determined as follows:

- 4 points for a win
- 2 points for a draw
- 0 point for a loss
- 1 bonus point for scoring 4 tries in a match
- 1 bonus point for losing by 7 points or fewer

== Division 1A ==
=== 2015 ===
==== Table ====
Key
| 2015 champions |

| Place | Nation | Games | | | | | Points | | | Table points |
| Place | Nation | Played | Won | Drawn | Lost | Bonus | For | Against | Diff | Table points |
|---|---|---|---|---|---|---|---|---|---|---|
| 1 | Georgia (14) | 5 | 5 | 0 | 0 | 1 | 158 | 42 | +116 | 21 |
| 2 | Romania (17) | 5 | 3 | 0 | 2 | 3 | 102 | 61 | +41 | 15 |
| 3 | Spain (21) | 5 | 3 | 0 | 2 | 2 | 131 | 99 | +32 | 14 |
| 4 | Russia (19) | 5 | 3 | 0 | 2 | 1 | 103 | 119 | −16 | 13 |
| 5 | Portugal (22) | 5 | 1 | 0 | 4 | 1 | 52 | 100 | −48 | 5 |
| 6 | Germany (25) | 5 | 0 | 0 | 5 | 1 | 61 | 186 | −125 | 1 |

Pre-tournament World Rugby Rankings in parentheses

==== Games ====
7 February 2015

| Portugal | 10–37 | Romania |
| Try: Nuno Costa 47' c Con: Pedro Ávila; Pen: Pedro Ávila 26' | Team Sheet | Try: Robert Dascalu 20' c Mihai Macovei 36' c Ionut Botezatu 42' c Dănuț Dumbravă 47' c Con: Valentin Calafeteanu (4); Pen: Valentin Calafeteanu (3) 3', 12', 15' |

Estádio Universitário de Lisboa, Lisbon
Attendance: 1,000
Referee: Luke Pearce (England)

7 February 2015

| Spain | 43–20 | Russia |
| Try: Jesus Recuerda Nunez 13' c Martin Heredia (2) 16', 35' c Pedro Martin Enrique (2) 21', 59'; Guillaume Rouet 48' c Jaime Nava de Olano 56' c Con: Dan Snee (4) | Team Sheet | Try: Denis Antonov 39' c Igor Galinovsky 79' c Con: Yury Kushnarev (2); Pen: Yury Kushnarev (2) 7', 31' |

Estadio Nacional Complutense, Madrid
Attendance: 6,500
Referee: Andrew McMenemy (Scotland)

7 February 2015

| Germany | 8–64 | Georgia |
| Try: Steffen Liebig 26'; Drop: Jeremy Te Huia 2' | Team Sheet | Try: Zurabi Zhvania (3) 12' c, 33' c, 38'; Penalty try (2) 16' c, 59'; Alexander Todua (2) 39', 63'; Lasha Khmaladze 44' c Giorgi Nemsadze 61' c Aleksandre Khutsishvili 66' c Con: Lasha Khmaladze (4); Lasha Malaguradze (3) |

Sportpark Martinsee, Heusenstamm
Attendance: 3,000
Referee: Laurent Cardona (France)

14 February 2015

| Georgia | 20–15 | Portugal |
| Try: Davit Kacharava 1'; Pen: Merab Kvirikashvili (5) 23', 38', 40', 46', 70' | Team Sheet | Pen: Pedro Ávila (5) 10' 15', 36', 66', 80' |

Mikheil Meskhi Stadium, Tbilisi
Attendance: 12,000
Referee: Vlad Iordăchescu (Romania)

14 February 2015

| Romania | 29–8 | Spain |
| Try: Adrian Apostol 15'; Viorel Lucaci 36' c Andrei Ursache 61'; Valentin Calafeteanu 63'; Marius Sîrbe 75' c Con: Valentin Calafeteanu; Dănuț Dumbravă | Team Sheet | Try: Guillaume Rouet 50'; Pen: Guillaume Rouet 6' |

Cluj Arena, Cluj-Napoca
Attendance: 1,500
Referee: David Wilkinson (Ireland)

14 February 2015

| Germany | 22–46 | Russia |
| Try: Kehoma Brenner (3) 5', 32' c, 56' c Con: Christopher Hilsenbeck (2); Pen: Christopher Hilsenbeck 1' | Team Sheet | Try: Vasily Artemyev (2) 20', 79' c Stanislav Selskii 24' c Igor Kurashov (2) 61' c, 74'; Alexey Volkov (2) 65' c, 70'; Con: Ramil Gaisin (4); Pen: Ramil Gaisin 68' |

Pforzheim
Attendance: 1,300
Referee: Cedric Marchat (France)

28 February 2015

| Spain | 13–26 | Georgia |
| Try: Julen Goia Iriberri 24' c Con: Brad Linklater; Pen: Brad Linklater (2) 1', 38' | Team Sheet | Try: Zurab Zhvania 28' c Davit Kacharava 80' c Con: Merab Kvirikashvili (2); Pen: Merab Kvirikashvili (4) 12', 35', 57', 65' |

Estadio Nacional Complutense, Madrid
Attendance: 9,000
Referee: Alexandre Ruiz (France)

28 February 2015

| Russia | 16–13 | Romania |
| Try: Denis Antonov 45' c Con: Ramil Gaisin; Pen: Ramil Gaisin (3) 13', 54', 59' | Team Sheet | Try: Valentin Calafeteanu 20' c Con: Valentin Calafeteanu; Pen: Valentin Calafeteanu (2) 40', 61' |

Krasnodar
Attendance: 1,500
Referee: Ian Davies (Wales)

28 February 2015

| Portugal | 11–3 | Germany |
| Try: Francisco Sousa 30'; Pen: Pedro Bettencourt (2) 76', 80' | Team Sheet | Pen: Christopher Hilsenbeck 55' |

Estádio Universitário de Lisboa, Lisbon
Attendance: 700
Referee: Giuseppe Vivarini (Italy)

14 March 2015

| Georgia | 33–0 | Russia |
| Try: Davit Kacharava 71' c Zurab Zhvania 79' c Karlen Asieshvili 80' c Con: Merab Kvirikashvili (3); Pen: Merab Kvirikashvili (4) 3', 29, 55', 64' | Team Sheet |

Mikheil Meskhi Stadium, Tbilisi
Attendance: 30,000 (approx)
Referee: Neil Hennessy (Wales)

14 March 2015

| Portugal | 8–19 | Spain |
| Try: Tomas Noronha 29'; Pen: Nuno Costa 20' | Team Sheet | Try: Julen Goia Iriberri 1'; Sergi Aubanell Sevilla 65'; Pen: Sergi Aubanell Sevilla (3) 13', 60', 76' |

Estádio Municipal Sérgio Conceição, Coimbra
Attendance: 2,000
Referee: Matthew Carley (England)

14 March 2015

| Germany | 12–17 | Romania |
| Pen: Jeremy Te Huia (3) 23', 58', 75'; Drop: Dale Garner 17' | Team Sheet | Try: Adrian Apostol 20'; Pen: Florin Vlaicu (4) 2', 69', 76', 78' |

Fritz-Grunebaum-Sportpark, Heidelberg
Attendance: 2,513
Referee: Lloyd Linton (Scotland)

21 March 2015

| Romania | 6–15 | Georgia |
| Pen: Valentin Calafeteanu 15'; Danut Dumbrava 68' | WR Sheet | Pen: Merab Kvirikashvili (5) 19', 34', 39', 45', 63' |

Stadionul Arcul de Triumf, Bucharest
Attendance: 4,500
Referee: Gary Conway (Ireland)

21 March 2015

| Russia | 21–8 | Portugal |
| Try: Alexey Panasenko 7' c Alexey Shcherban 59'; Con: Yury Kushnarev; Pen: Yury Kushnarev (3) 19', 40+1', 80+4' | Team Sheet | Try: Salvador Santos 72'; Drop: Nuno Costa 25' |

Slava Metreveli Central Stadium, Sochi
Attendance: 1,200
Referee: Ian Tempest (England)

21 March 2015

| Spain | 48–16 | Germany |
| Try: Julen Goia Iriberri (2) 20', 45' c Guillaume Guy Rouet (2) 50' c, 53'; Fabien Francois Grammatico 64' c David Barrera Howarth 66' c Jesús Recuerda Núñez 70' c Con: Brad Linklater (5); Pen: Brad Linklater 12' | Team Sheet | Try: Kieran Manawatu 59'; Umberto Pilla 80'; Pen: Christopher Hilsenbeck (2) 25', 49' |

Estadio Nacional Complutense, Madrid
Attendance: 2,000
Referee: Claudio Blessano (Italy)

=== 2016 ===
==== Table ====
| Place | Nation | Games | | | | | Points | | | Table points |
| Place | Nation | Played | Won | Drawn | Lost | Bonus | For | Against | Diff | Table points |
|---|---|---|---|---|---|---|---|---|---|---|
| 1 | Georgia (12) | 5 | 5 | 0 | 0 | 4 | 188 | 33 | +155 | 24 |
| 2 | Romania (16) | 5 | 4 | 0 | 1 | 3 | 160 | 77 | +83 | 19 |
| 3 | Russia (18) | 5 | 3 | 0 | 2 | 1 | 128 | 115 | +13 | 14 |
| 4 | Spain (22) | 5 | 1 | 1 | 3 | 3 | 84 | 88 | −4 | 9 |
| 5 | Germany (23) | 5 | 1 | 1 | 3 | 1 | 84 | 193 | −109 | 7 |
| 6 | Portugal (30) | 5 | 0 | 0 | 5 | 1 | 72 | 210 | −138 | 1 |

==== Games ====
6 February 2016
17:15 EET (UTC+2)

| Romania | 39–14 | Portugal |
| Try: Stephen Shennan (2) 16', 55'; Vlad Nistor (2) 43', 60'; Andrei Rădoi 66'; Con: Florin Vlaicu (4) 17', 44', 57', 67'; Pen: Florin Vlaicu (2) 34', 52' | Report | Try: Duarte Diniz 21'; Diogo van den Toorn 27'; Con: Nuno Guedes (2) 23', 29' |

Cluj Arena, Cluj-Napoca
Attendance: 3,000
Referee: Iñigo Atorrasagasti (Spain)

6 February 2016

| Russia | 22–20 | Spain |

Sochi
Attendance: 400
Referee: Luke Pearce (England)

6 February 2016
14:00 GET (UTC+4)

| Georgia | 59–7 | Germany |

Tbilisi
Attendance: 2,000
Referee: Maxime Burlet (Belgium)

13 February 2016

| Portugal | 3–29 | Georgia |

Lisbon
Referee: Ian Davies (Wales)

13 February 2016

| Spain | 18–21 | Romania |
| Try: Sébastien Ascarat (2) 36', 59'; Con: Bradley Linklater 37'; Pen: Bradley Linklater (2) 11', 21' | Report | Try: Mihai Macovei 27'; Valentin Popârlan 44'; Con: Florin Vlaicu 45'; Pen: Florin Vlaicu (3) 48', 66', 70' |

Madrid
Attendance: 7,000
Referee: Alexandre Ruiz (France)

13 February 2016

| Russia | 46–20 | Germany |
| Try: Anton Rudoi (2) 27', 78'; Igor Gurashov 17'; Viktor Gresev 23'; Alexey Shcherban 46'; Yuri Kushnarev 67'; Mikhail Babaev 71'; Con: Ramil Gaisin (2) 17', 27'; Yuri Kushnarev (2) 68', 78'; Pen: Ramil Gaisin 13' | Report | Try: Pavel Butenko 54'; Jarrid Els 63'; Con: Christopher Hilsenbeck (2) 55', 63'; Pen: Christopher Hilsenbeck (2) 19', 29' |

Sochi
Referee: Matteo Liperini (Italy)

27 February 2016

| Georgia | 38–7 | Spain |

Tbilisi
Referee: Ben Whitehouse (Wales)

27 February 2016

| Romania | 30–0 | Russia |

Emil Alexandrescu, Iași
Referee: Lloyd Linton (Scotland)

27 February 2016

| Germany | 50–26 | Portugal |
| | http://www.rugbyeurope.eu/match-4434.htm |

Rudolf-Kalweit-Stadion, Hannover
Attendance: 8,173
Referee: Frank Murphy (Ireland)

12 March 2016

| Russia | 7–24 | Georgia |

Sochi
Referee: Matthew Carley (England)

12 March 2016

| Spain | 39–7 | Portugal |

Madrid
Referee: Sean Gallagher (Ireland)

12 March 2016

| Romania | 61–7 | Germany |

Emil Alexandrescu, Iași
Referee: Claudio Blessano (Italy)

19 March 2016

| Georgia | 38–9 | Romania |

Boris Paichadze, Tbilisi
Attendance: 53,400
Referee: Tual Trainini (France)

19 March 2016

| Portugal | 21–53 | Russia |

Lisbon
Referee: Thomas Charabas (France)

19 March 2016

| Germany | 17–17 | Spain |

Sportpark Höhenberg, Cologne
Attendance: 6,214
Referee: Radu Petrescu (Romania)

=== Combined table (2015–2016) ===
| Place | Nation | Games | | | | | Points | | | Table points |
| Place | Nation | Played | Won | Drawn | Lost | Bonus | For | Against | Diff | Table points |
|---|---|---|---|---|---|---|---|---|---|---|
| 1 | Georgia (12) | 10 | 10 | 0 | 0 | 5 | 346 | 75 | +271 | 45 |
| 2 | Romania (16) | 10 | 7 | 0 | 3 | 6 | 262 | 138 | +124 | 34 |
| 3 | Russia (18) | 10 | 6 | 0 | 4 | 3 | 231 | 234 | −3 | 27 |
| 4 | Spain (22) | 10 | 4 | 1 | 5 | 5 | 232 | 207 | +28 | 23 |
| 5 | Germany (23) | 10 | 1 | 1 | 8 | 2 | 162 | 396 | −234 | 8 |
| 6 | Portugal (30) | 10 | 1 | 0 | 9 | 2 | 124 | 310 | −196 | 6 |

Note: Portugal is relegated to 2016–17 Rugby Europe Trophy.

== Division 1B ==
=== 2014–15 ===
==== Table ====
2014–15 champions

| Place | Nation | Games | | | | Points | | | Bonus points | Table points |
| Place | Nation | Played | Won | Drawn | Lost | For | Against | Diff | Bonus points | Table points |
|---|---|---|---|---|---|---|---|---|---|---|
| 1 | Belgium (30) | 5 | 5 | 0 | 0 | 189 | 78 | +111 | 2 | 22 |
| 2 | Moldova (29) | 5 | 3 | 0 | 2 | 158 | 83 | +75 | 4 | 16 |
| 3 | Ukraine (32) | 5 | 3 | 0 | 2 | 108 | 81 | +27 | 1 | 13 |
| 4 | Netherlands (31) | 5 | 2 | 0 | 3 | 81 | 74 | +7 | 3 | 11 |
| 5 | Poland (35) | 5 | 2 | 0 | 3 | 103 | 146 | −43 | 2 | 10 |
| 6 | Sweden (44) | 5 | 0 | 0 | 5 | 49 | 226 | −177 | 0 | 0 |

Pre-tournament IRB rankings in parentheses (as at 1 September 2014)

==== Games ====
6 September 2014

| Poland | 29–17 | Sweden |
| Try: Tomasz Gasik (2) 5' c, 33' c Piotr Zeszutek 44' c Grzegorz Buczek 79'; Con: Banaszek Dawid (3); Pen: Banaszek Dawid 77' | Report | Try: Jonathon Edwards 18' c Penalty try 68' c Con: Neil Erasmus (2); Pen: Neil Erasmus 23' |

Stadion Polonii, Warsaw
Attendance: 5,000
Referee: Radu Petrescu (Romania)

18 October 2014

| Poland | 9–8 | Netherlands |
| Pen: Banaszek Dawid (3) 10', 13', 73' | Team Sheet | Try: Pieter Mol 63'; Pen: Tomasz Rokicki 17' |

Warsaw
Attendance: 5,000
Referee: Maxime Burlet (Belgium)

18 October 2014

| Sweden | 0–45 | Ukraine |
| | Team Sheet | Try: Vitalii Krasnodemskyi (2) 2', 32'; Sergii Garkavyi (2) 20' c, 37'; Oleg Kosariev 55' c Eduard Vertyletskyi 80' c Con: Oleg Kosariev (3); Pen: Oleg Kosariev (2) 16', 40'; Drop: Volodymyr Voitov 30' |

Enköping
Referee: Graeme Wells (Scotland)

8 November 2014

| Moldova | 29–15 | Ukraine |
| Try: Nicolae Chirila 6'; Ion Cavcaliuc 21'; Ruslan Dorogan 32' c Gheorghe Gajion 65' c Maxim Cobilas 73'; Con: Craig Felston (2) | Team Sheet | Try: Vitalii Krasnodemsky 12' c Oleksandr Khomenko 58'; Con: Ihor Snisarenko; Pen: Ihor Snisarenko 18' |

Dinamo Stadium, Chișinău
Attendance: 2,000
Referee: Thomas Charabas (France)

15 November 2014

| Moldova | 48–25 | Poland |
| Try: Oleg Prepelita (4) 7', 32' c, 65' c, 75'; Gheorghe Gajion 16' c Dumitru Arhip 21'; Penalty try 29' c Vasili Buzgan 42'; Con: Mihai Golubenco (4) | Team Sheet | Try: Robert Kwiatkowski 38' c Tomasz Rokicki (2) 46' c, 50'; Con: Dawid Banaszek (2); Pen: Dawid Banaszek (2) 4', 40+4' |

Dinamo Stadium, Chișinău
Attendance: 900
Referee: Giuseppe Vivarini (Italy)

15 November 2014

| Belgium | 25–10 | Ukraine |
| Try: Julien Berger 48' c Con: Nicolas Meeus; Pen: Nicolas Meeus (6) 4', 40', 54', 71', 77', 80' | Team Sheet | Try: Oleksandr Polianskyi 18' c Con: Volodymyr Voitov; Pen: Andrii Shakura 45' |

Namur
Attendance: 1,500
Referee: Radu Petrescu (Romania)

22 November 2014

| Moldova | 57–8 | Sweden |
| Try: Oleg Prepelita (3) 11' c, 22' c, 63' c Gheorghe Gajion 34' c Andrei Romanov (3) 43' c, 47', 69'; Mihai Artic 55' c Gheorghe Volosciuc 79'; Con: Mihai Golubenco (6) | Team Sheet | Try: Daniel Chamberlain 71'; Pen: Ian Gowland 9' |

Dinamo Stadium, Chișinău
Attendance: 500
Referee: Tomáš Tuma (Czech Republic)

21 February 2015

| Netherlands | 21–23 | Belgium |
| Try: Pieter Mol 35'; Pascal van Overeem 39' c Con: Leon Koenen; Pen: Leon Koenen (2) 25', 32'; Storm Carroll 77' | Team Sheet | Try: Penalty try 15' c Baptiste Lescarboura (2) 27', 80'; Con: Nicolus Meeus; Pen: Nicolus Meeus (2) 8', 23' |

National Rugby Centre Amsterdam, Amsterdam
Attendance: 1,000
Referee: Leo Colgan (Ireland)

28 February 2015

| Netherlands | 18–10 | Moldova |
| Try: Dirk Danen 27'; Sep Visser 40'; Leon Koenen 72'; Pen: Leon Koenen 5' | Team Sheet | Try: Veaceslav Titica (2) 53', 79' |

National Rugby Centre Amsterdam, Amsterdam
Attendance: 1,000
Referee: Paulo Duarte (Portugal)

14 March 2015

| Belgium | 17–14 | Moldova |
| Try: Christope Debaty 17' c Thomas Demolder 35' c Con: Alan Williams (2); Pen: Alan Williams 45' | Team Sheet | Try: Veaceslav Titica 42'; Vadim Cobilas 57'; Con: Octavian Manoli; Dorin Petrache |

Brussels
Referee: Iñigo Atorrasagasti (Spain)

28 March 2015

| Belgium | 71–10 | Sweden |
| Try: Thomas Demolder 7' c Baptiste Lescarboura (3) 10' c, 36', 46' c Alan Williams 18'; Alain Miriallakis (3) 22' c, 27' c, 39' c Floriant Piron (2) 54' c, 74' c Hugo Sensee 59'; Con: Alan Williams (7); Pablo Francisco Villar | Team Sheet | Try: Andreas Austa 25' c Con: Andreas Nilserius; Pen: Jonathan Edwards 13' |

KVW-Zaventem Stadium, Brussels
Attendance: 950
Referee: Ben Whitehouse (Wales)

18 April 2015

| Belgium | 53–23 | Poland |
| Try: Charles Reynaert (2); Guillaume Piron; Baptiste Lescarboura; Bertrand Bilii; Max Dubois; Quentin Boucar; Kevin Williams; Con: Florian Piron (2); Nicolas Meeus (3); Pen: Florian Piron | | Try: Mateusz Bartoszek; Patryk Reksulak; Con: Dawid Banaszek (2); Pen: Dawid Banaszek (2); Drop: Dawid Popławski |

Brussels
Attendance: 2,000

9 May 2015

| Poland | 17–20 | Ukraine |
| Try: Tomasz Rokicki 3'; Pen: Dawid Banaszek (4) 21', 28', 56', 69' | Team Sheet | Try: Vitali Kramarenko 9' c Ievgen Chaika 51' c Con: Oleg Kosariev (2); Pen: Oleg Kosariev (2) 14', 80+4' |

Arena Lublin, Lublin
Attendance: 7,500
Referee: Tomáš Tůma (Czech Republic)

23 May 2015

| Ukraine | 18–10 | Netherlands |
| Try: Vyecheslav Ponomarenko 60' try 70'; Oleg Kosariev 78'; Drop: Oleg Kosariev 52' | | Try: Norbecio Mambo 56' c Con: Maarten Van Osch 57'; Pen: Storm Carroll 3' |

Odesa

30 May 2015

| Netherlands | 24–14 | Sweden |
| Try: Rik Roovers 7'; Kyle Beakey 41' c Leon Koenan 66' c Norbecio Mambo 72'; Con: Leon Koenan; Maarten Van Osch | | Try: Magnus Rappestad 21' c Dustin Eaton 62' c Con: Dustin Eaton; Neill Erasmus |

Amsterdam
Attendance: 1,000

=== 2015–16 ===
==== Table ====
| Place | Nation | Games | | | | Points | | | Bonus points | Table points |
| Place | Nation | Played | Won | Drawn | Lost | For | Against | Diff | Bonus points | Table points |
|---|---|---|---|---|---|---|---|---|---|---|
| 1 | Ukraine (31) | 5 | 5 | 0 | 0 | 136 | 84 | +30 | 3 | 23 |
| 2 | Belgium (26) | 5 | 4 | 0 | 1 | 127 | 65 | +62 | 3 | 19 |
| 3 | Moldova (32) | 5 | 2 | 0 | 3 | 87 | 84 | +3 | 3 | 11 |
| 4 | Netherlands (33) | 5 | 2 | 0 | 3 | 113 | 123 | −10 | 1 | 11 |
| 5 | Poland (36) | 5 | 2 | 0 | 3 | 88 | 116 | −28 | 0 | 8 |
| 6 | Sweden (49) | 5 | 0 | 0 | 5 | 71 | 150 | −79 | 1 | 1 |

Pre-tournament World Rugby rankings in parentheses (as at 1 September 2015)

==== Games ====
12 September 2015

| Sweden | 11–29 | Poland |

Enköping
Attendance: 325

29 September 2015

| Sweden | 20–48 | Belgium |
| Try: Gowland 32'; Darbyshire 47'; Con: Erasmus (2); Pen: Erasmus (2) | | Try: Lescarboura (2) 22', 40'; Corradi 36'; Vocea 44'; Sensee 58'; Penalty try (2) 55', 65'; Con: Piron (5); Pen: Piron |

Enköping
Attendance: 1 000
Referee: S. Gaffikin

10 October 2015

| Ukraine | 17–16 | Belgium |

Kyiv
Referee: Radu Petrescu (Romania)

17 October 2015

| Ukraine | 30–14 | Poland |
| Try: S. Tserkovniy (2) 22' c, 39'; S. Sukhikh 75'; M. Kirsanov 80' c Con: O. Kosariev (2) 11', 81'; Pen: O. Kosariev (2) 11', 46' | | Try: M. Bartoszek 43' c R. Szrejber 55' c Con: D. Banaszek (2) 44', 56' |

Podilla, Khmelnytskyi
Attendance: 3,180
Referee: Vlad Iordăchescu (Romania)

7 November 2015

| Sweden | 7–25 | Moldova |
| Try: Johansson 76' c Con: Johansson 76' | | Try: Titica 6' c, 54'; Prepelita 14', 37'; Con: Golubenco 6'; Pen: Golubenco 11' |

Malmö
Attendance: 200
Referee: T. Tuma (Czech Republic)

14 November 2015

| Poland | 18–14 | Moldova |
| Try: Sirocki 71'; Wilczuk 74' c Con: Banaszek 75'; Pen: Banaszek (2) 13', 52' | | Try: Castravet 55' c Gajion 78'; Con: Petrache 56' |

Polonian Stadium, Warsaw
Attendance: 5500
Referee: Iñigo Atorrasagasti (Spain)

20 February 2016

| Belgium | 32–8 | Netherlands |

Brussels
Referee: Radu Petrescu (Romania)

12 March 2016

| Moldova | 9–10 | Belgium |
| Pen: Golubenco (3) 23', 43', 73' | | Try: Benoy 81'; Con: Meeus 81'; Pen: Meeus 25' |

Chișinău
Attendance: 700
Referee: E. Rizzo (Italy)

19 March 2016

| Poland | 11–21 | Belgium |

Warsaw
Referee: Ian Tempest (England)

19 March 2016

| Moldova | 22–13 | Netherlands |

Chișinău
Referee: T. Tuma (Czech Republic)

30 April 2016

| Netherlands | 40–16 | Poland |
| Try: Tom Altink 23'; Dirk Danen 32'; Rik Roovers 44' c Norbecio Mambo 64'; Amir Rademaker 78'; Alex Povel 82' c Con: Leon Koenen (2) 45', 83'; Pen: Storm Carroll (2) 2', 14' | | Try: Kamil Babryk 19'; Aleksander Nowicki 70'; Pen: Michał Kępac 11'; Tomasz Gasik 29' |

Amsterdam
Attendance: 5,000
Referee: F. Himmer (Germany)

30 April 2016

| Ukraine | 23–10 | Sweden |
| Try: Viacheslav Ponomarenko 17' c Ivan Zalizniak 80' c Con: Oleg Kosariev (2) 8', 80'; Pen: Oleg Kosariev (3) 40', 42', 48' | | Try: Frederik Ensta 50' c Con: Philip Murphy 51'; Pen: Jimmie Rissanen |

National Tax University of Ukraine, Irpin
Attendance: 400
Referee: Paulo Duarte

7 May 2016

| Netherlands | 27–30 | Ukraine |

14 May 2016

| Sweden | 23–25 | Netherlands |

15 May 2016

| Ukraine | 36–17 | Moldova |

Odesa
Referee: Cedric Marchat (France)

=== Combined table (2014–2016) ===
| Place | Nation | Games | | | | Points | | | Bonus points | Table points |
| Place | Nation | Played | Won | Drawn | Lost | For | Against | Diff | Bonus points | Table points |
|---|---|---|---|---|---|---|---|---|---|---|
| 1 | Belgium (30) | 10 | 9 | 0 | 1 | 316 | 143 | +173 | 5 | 41 |
| 2 | Ukraine (32) | 10 | 8 | 0 | 2 | 244 | 165 | +79 | 4 | 36 |
| 3 | Moldova (29) | 10 | 5 | 0 | 5 | 245 | 167 | +78 | 7 | 27 |
| 4 | Netherlands (31) | 10 | 4 | 0 | 6 | 194 | 197 | −3 | 6 | 22 |
| 5 | Poland (35) | 10 | 4 | 0 | 6 | 191 | 262 | −71 | 2 | 18 |
| 6 | Sweden (44) | 10 | 0 | 0 | 10 | 120 | 376 | −256 | 1 | 1 |

Promotion to 2017 Rugby Europe Championship
Relegation to 2016–17 Rugby Europe Conference

Pre-tournament IRB rankings in parentheses (as at 1 September 2014)

== See also ==
- European Nations Cup (rugby union)
- FIRA - Association of European Rugby
- Six Nations Championship
- Antim Cup
