= Tetrashvili =

Tetrashvili (Georgian: თეთრაშვილი) is a Georgian surname. Notable people with the surname include:

- Giorgi Tetrashvili (born 1993), Georgian rugby player
- Guram Tetrashvili (born 1988), Russian football player
