= Cătălin Fercu =

Romania international rugby union player

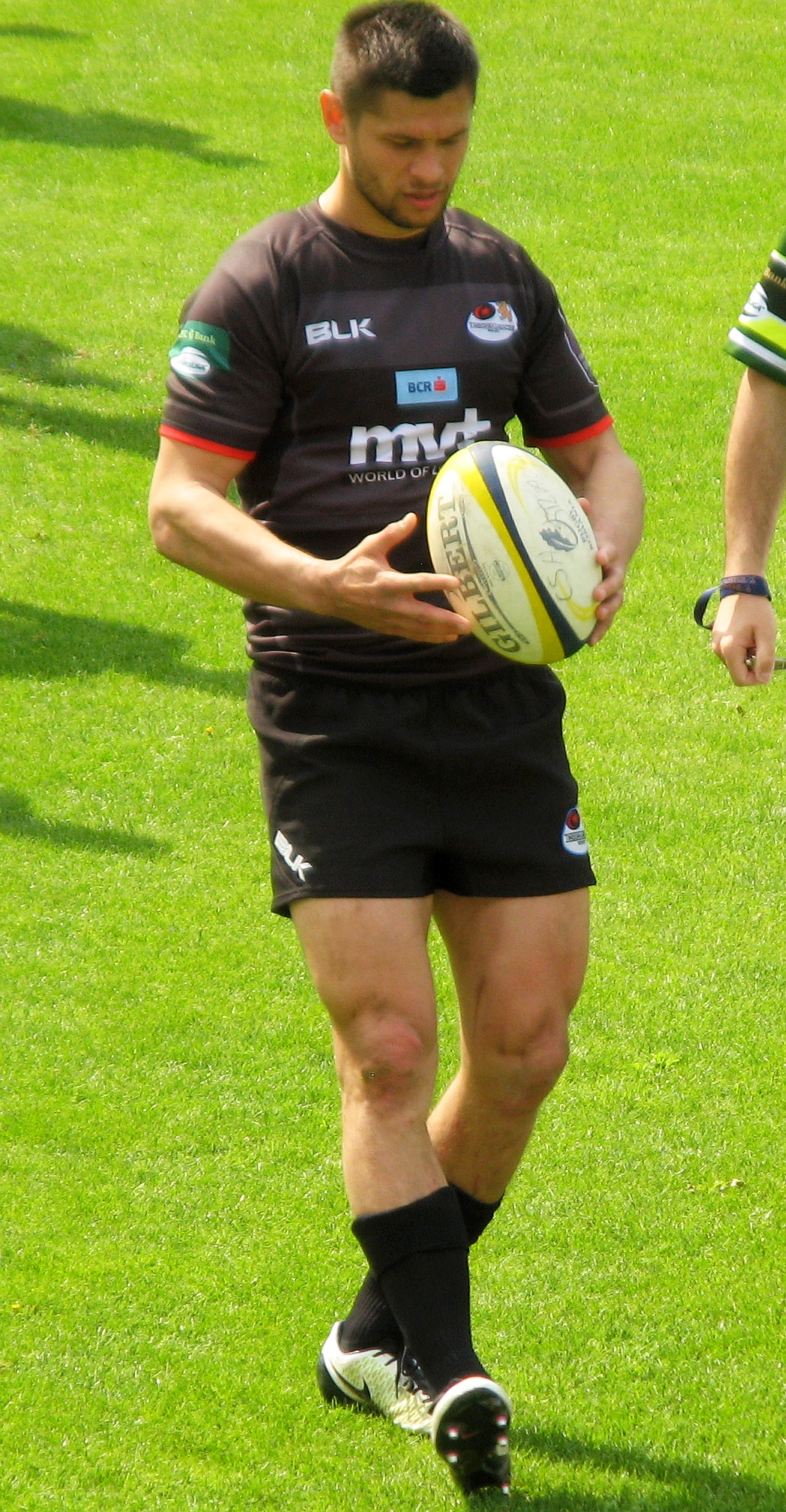
- Fercu playing for Timișoara in 2017
- Born: 5 September 1986 (age 40) Brașov, Romania
- Height: 1.81 m (5 ft 11 in)
- Weight: 85 kg (187 lb)

Rugby union career
- Position(s): Fullback, Wing
Senior career
Years	Team	Apps	(Points)
2004–2005	Metrorex București		
2005–2007	Contor Zenner Arad		
2007–2009	Steaua București		
2009–2010	Contor Zenner Arad		
2010–2014	RCM Timișoara		
2014–2015	Saracens		
2015–2021	RCM Timișoara		
Provincial / State sides
Years	Team	Apps	(Points)
2005–2014	București Wolves	28	(40)
International career
Years	Team	Apps	(Points)
2005–2020	Romania	109	(171)

Cătălin Fercu (born 5 September 1986) is a Romanian retired professional rugby union player, who played at the fullback and wing positions. He has played in 109 international matches for Romania.

== Career ==
Fercu started his senior career with Metrorex București in 2004. He made his European debut in the 2005–06 season as Bucharest Wolves played in the European Challenge Cup. Having scored a try in his first season better was to come in his second year in Europe scoring six tries in the group stages a great achievement however it was not enough to get Bucharest Wolves through their group and this prevented Fercu from potentially being the tournaments top try scorer. Such notable achievements in the 2006–07 European Challenge Cup include a hat-trick of tries against French side Bayonne.

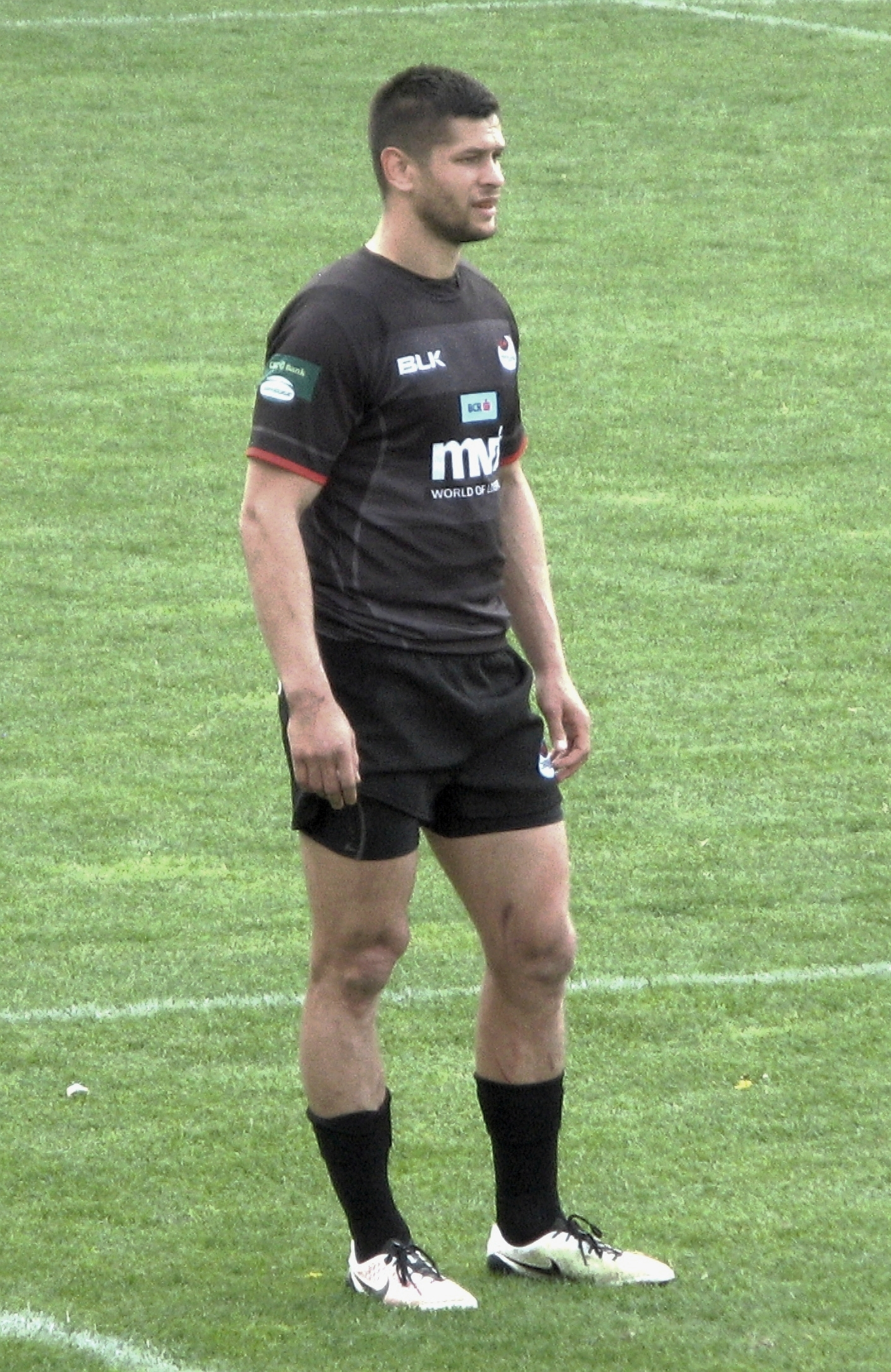
Fercu in April 2017

Fercu has also made appearances on the international stage at a young age and he played against France and Scotland in the Autumn internationals in 2006. He also scored a try against the French. Fercu helped guide Romania to the 2007 Rugby World Cup as he played in the qualifier matches including the vital games against Georgia and Spain and scored a try against Spain in the game that sealed their qualification to the Rugby World Cup.

Fercu was a late withdrawal from their Rugby World Cup squad because he was not prepared to fly all the way to New Zealand. The Romanian side arrived in Christchurch to prepare for their first game of the tournament against Scotland in Invercargill on 10 September without Fercu, who failed to get on the plane when it left Romania.

Fercu has been a player for Saracens since October 2014. He played in the winning Aviva A League team, Saracens Storm, as well as for the Saracens LV Cup winning team. On 28 March 2015, he made his debut in the Aviva Premiership against Harlequins 42–14 at the Wembley Stadium in London, England, in front of a world record breaking assistance of 84,068.

== Honours ==
=== Club ===
Steaua

- Romanian Cup: 2009

Timișoara

- Romanian League (4): 2012, 2013, 2017, 2018

Saracens

- English Premiership: 2015
- Anglo-Welsh Cup: 2015

=== International ===
Romania

- Under-20 European Championship: 2006
- Rugby Europe Championship: 2017
