= Jack Cobden =

Romania international rugby union player

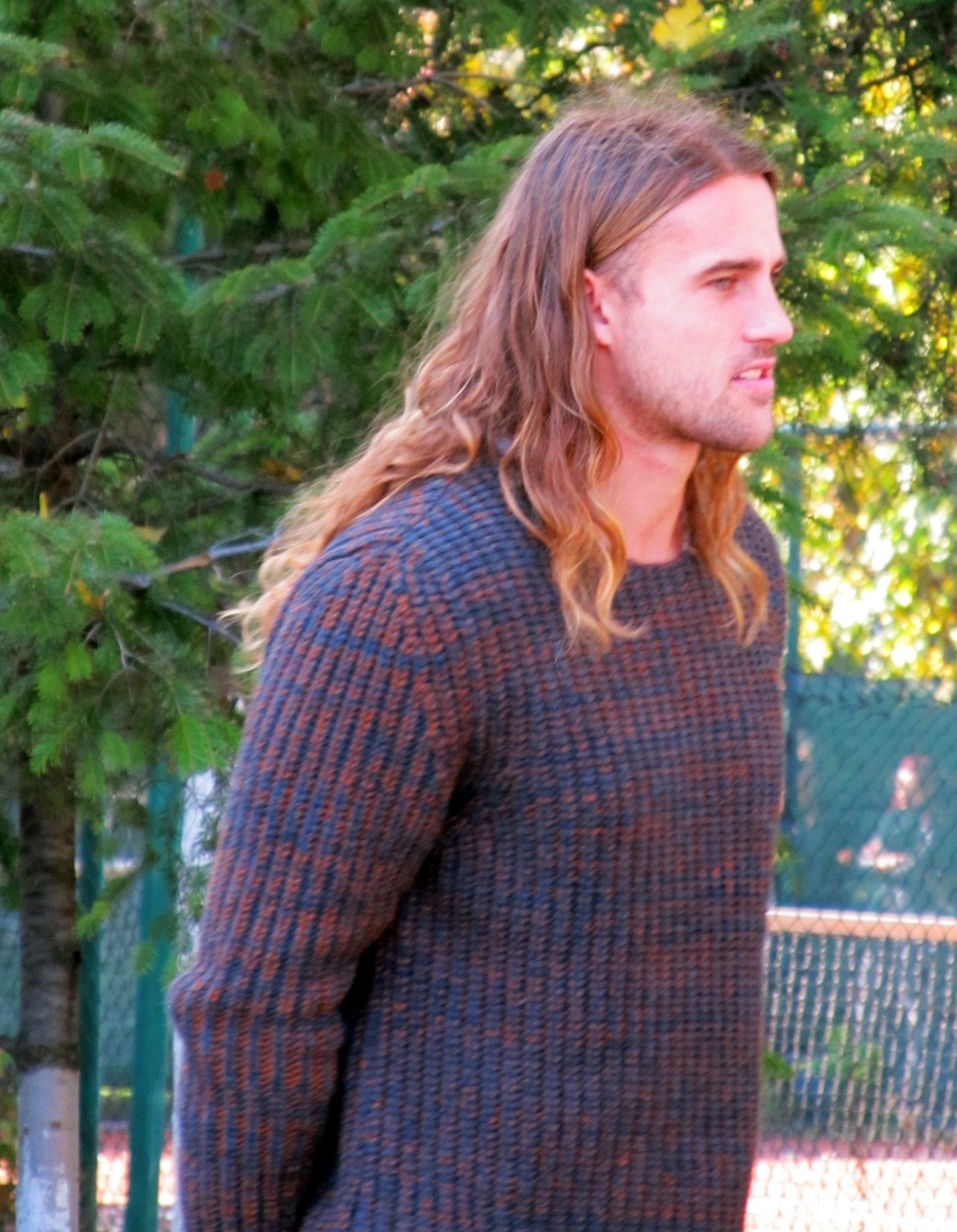
- Cobden attending a rugby union match in 2015
- Born: Jack Cobden; 26 March 1989 (age 37) England
- Height: 1.88 m (6 ft 2 in)
- Weight: 100 kg (15 st 10 lb)
- Notable relative: Beth Cobden (sister)

Rugby union career
- Position: Winger
- Current team: CSM București
Youth career
- 2005–2009: Leicester Tigers
Senior career
Years	Team	Apps	(Points)
2009–2013	Nottingham RFC	99	(160)
2013–2019	CSM București	75	(175)
International career
Years	Team	Apps	(Points)
2007	England U18	6	(5)
2009	England U20	4	(0)
2017–	Romania	3	(10)
- Correct as of 2 July 2017

Jack Cobden (born 26 March 1989) is an England-born Romanian rugby union player. His regular position is winger.

== Career ==
He started his career at Leicester Tigers. He played for England U16, U18 and U20. In 2009, he moved to Nottingham RFC, in RFU Championship. He joined Romanian SuperLiga side CSM Olimpia București in 2013.

Jack also plays for Romania's national team, the Oaks, making his international debut at the 2017 Rugby Europe Championship in a match against Belgium where he scored two tries with his first two touches.
