= Mathieu Bélie =

French rugby union player

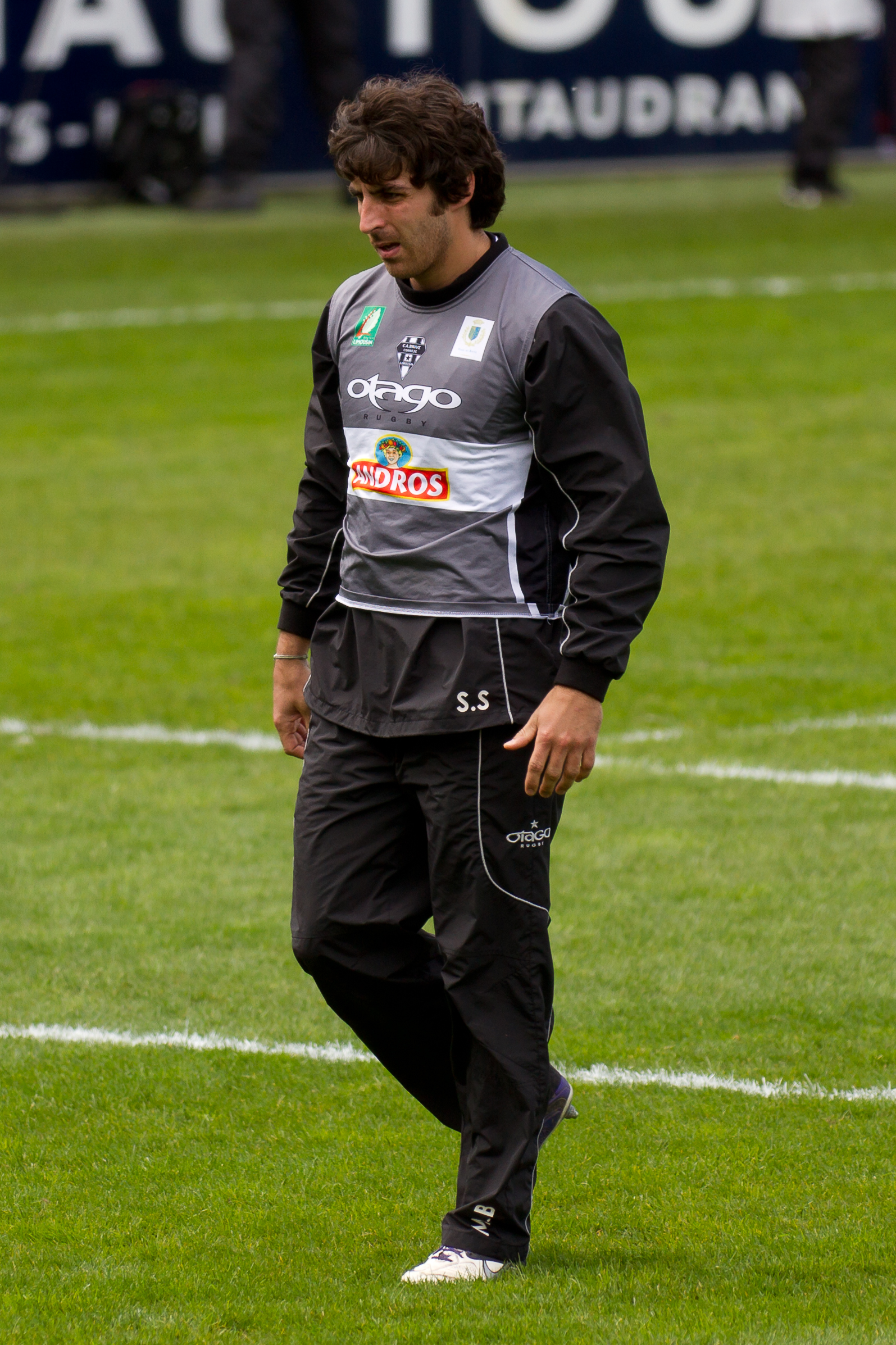
- Born: Mathieu Bélie; 20 February 1988 (age 38) Toulouse, France
- Height: 1.81 m (5 ft 11 1/2 in)
- Weight: 88 kg (13 st 12 lb)

Rugby union career
- Position(s): Scrum-half, Fly-half
Senior career
Years	Team	Apps	(Points)
2007-2009	Toulouse	12	(42)
2009-2010	US Montauban	23	(12)
2010-2012	CA Brive	36	(254)
2012-2013	Racing 92	13	(0)
2013-2014	Aviron Bayonnais	23	(8)
2014-2017	USA Perpignan	48	(88)

Mathieu Bélie (born 20 February 1988 in Toulouse, France) is a French born Spanish rugby union footballer, currently playing for CA Brive in the Top 14. His usual position was at Fly-half, but he now plays at Scrum-half. Prior to joining CA Brive he played for US Montauban and Stade Toulousain where he won the 2007-08 Top 14.

== Personal life ==
Born in France, Bélie is of Spanish descent through his maternal grandmother.

== Honours ==
- Top 14: 2008 with Stade Toulousain.
