= Dan Snee =

- Full name: Daniel Ross Snee
- Born: 30 April 1984 (age 42)
- Height: 5 ft 11 in (180 cm)
- Weight: 211 lb (96 kg)

Rugby union career
- Position: Centre / Fly-half
Provincial / State sides
Years	Team	Apps	(Points)
2008	Otago	2	(0)
2017	Hawke's Bay	3	(8)
International career
Years	Team	Apps	(Points)
2013–18	Spain	33	(19)

Daniel Ross Snee (born 30 April 1984) is a New Zealand-born former international rugby union player.

Snee grew up in Lower Hutt and is the nephew of former Hawke's Bay second five-eighth Len Snee. He was a New Zealand under-19 representative player and competed briefly with Otago in 2008.

A centre and first five-eighth, Snee relocated to Spain in 2010 to play rugby with Getxo. His coach at Getxo, New Zealander Bryce Bevin, recruited him alongside Brad Linklater. He was a member of the Spain national team between 2013 and 2018, earning a total of 33 caps. Back in New Zealand, Snee made three appearances for Hawke's Bay in 2017, while playing club rugby with Havelock North outside Hastings.

Snee graduated from the Royal New Zealand Police College in 2019.

== See also ==
- List of Spain national rugby union players
