= Guillaume Rouet =

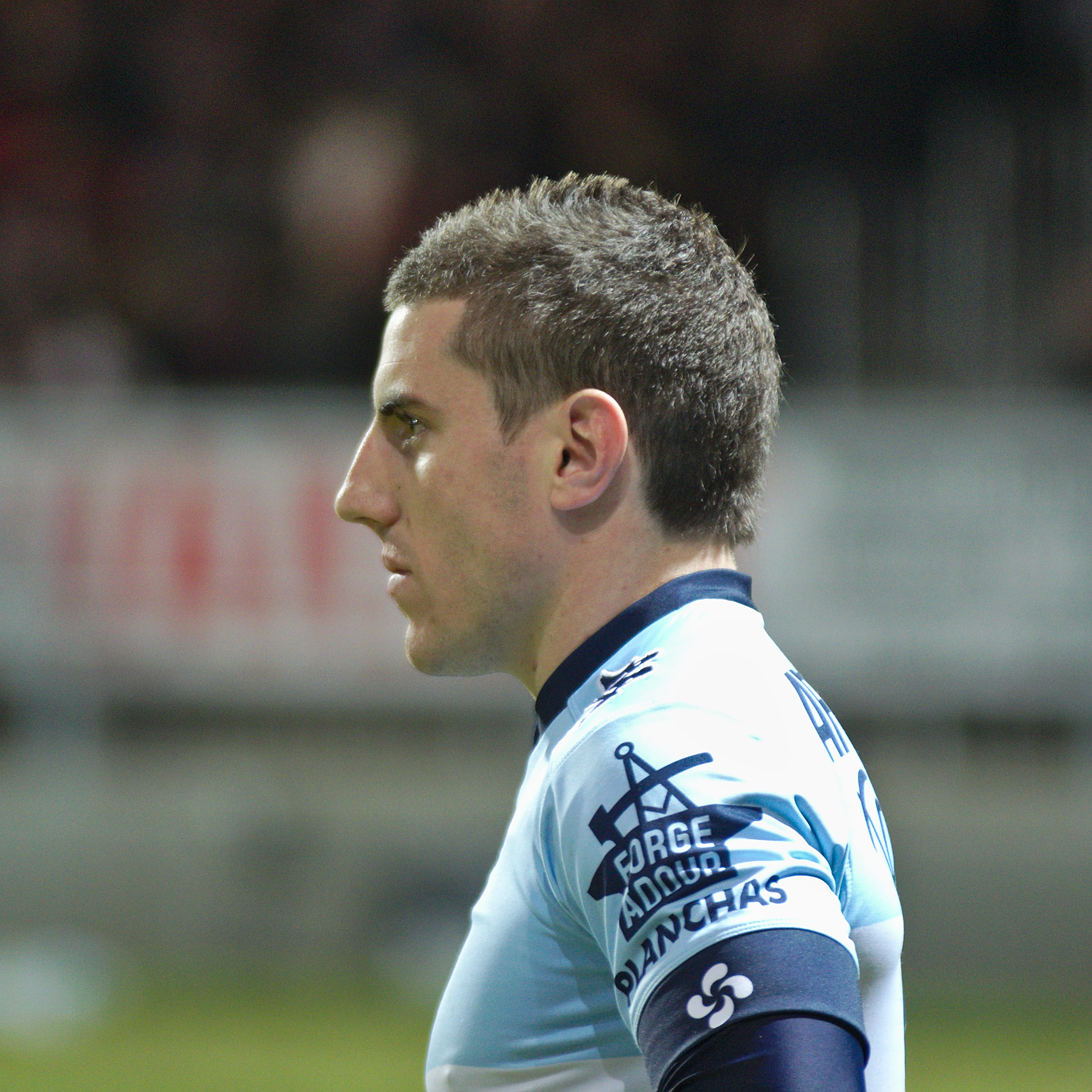
- Born: Guillaume Rouet; 13 August 1988 (age 38) Bayonne, France
- Height: 1.70 m (5 ft 7 in)
- Weight: 71 kg (11 st 3 lb)

Rugby union career
- Position: Scrum-half
Senior career
Years	Team	Apps	(Points)
2010–	Bayonne	187	(148)
- Correct as of 14 April 2021
International career
Years	Team	Apps	(Points)
2014–2022	Spain	23	(45)
- Correct as of 14 April 2021

Guillaume Rouet (born 13 August 1988) is a rugby union player. He plays at scrum-half for Bayonne in the Top 14. Born in France, he plays internationally for Spain.

== Personal life ==
His brother Sébastien Rouet is also a rugby player and a Spanish international. Rouet is of Spanish descent through a grandmother.
