= Jamie Murphy (rugby) =

Wales international rugby league and rugby union footballer

Personal information
- Born: 29 December 1989 (age 35); Bridgend, Wales
- Height: 178 cm (5 ft 10 in)
- Weight: 89 kg (14 st 0 lb)

Playing information

Rugby league
- Position: Centre, Wing
Club
Years	Team	Pld	T	G	FG	P
2011	North Wales Crusaders	2	0	0	0	0
2016	Gloucestershire All Golds	1	0	0	0	0
2020–	West Wales Raiders	13	10	4	0	48
	Total	16	10	4	0	48
Representative
Years	Team	Pld	T	G	FG	P
2015	Wales	2	0	0	0	0

Rugby union
Club
Years	Team	Pld	T	G	FG	P
	Bridgend Ravens	194	0	0	0	0
Representative
Years	Team	Pld	T	G	FG	P
2017	Germany	11	1	0	0	5

Jamie Murphy (born 29 December 1989) is a Welsh rugby league player currently playing for the West Wales Raiders in the RFL League 1. His position is at centre. He previously played rugby union for Bridgend Ravens & Newport RFC Aberavon Wizards, and Ospreys (3 appearances, all in the Anglo-Welsh Cup).

== Rugby League ==
In October and November 2015, Jamie represented the Wales rugby league team in the 2015 European Cup.

== Rugby Union ==
In February 2009, he played in 1 match for the Wales national under-20 rugby union team at U20 Six Nations.

In February 2017, Jamie made his début for the Germany rugby union team in the Six Nations B tournament defeating Romania. He qualifies through his grandmother's German heritage.
