= Lasha Tabidze =

- Born: July 4, 1997 (age 29) Tbilisi, Georgia
- Height: 1.85 m (6 ft 1 in)
- Weight: 115 kg (18 st 2 lb)

Rugby union career
- Position: Tighthead Prop
Senior career
Years	Team	Apps	(Points)
2016-	Bordeaux	45	(5)
- Correct as of 17 July 2021
International career
Years	Team	Apps	(Points)
2016-2017	Georgia U20	11	(10)
2017-	Georgia	1	(0)
- Correct as of 17 July 2021

Lasha Tabidze (Georgian: ლაშა ტაბიძე; born 4 July 1997) is a Georgian rugby union player. He plays as Tighthead Prop for Bordeaux espoirs in Top 14. He was announced as best tighthead prop in 2016 World Rugby Under 20 Championship dream team.
