= Lucian Mureșan (rugby union) =

Romanian rugby union football player

Ionuț Mureșan
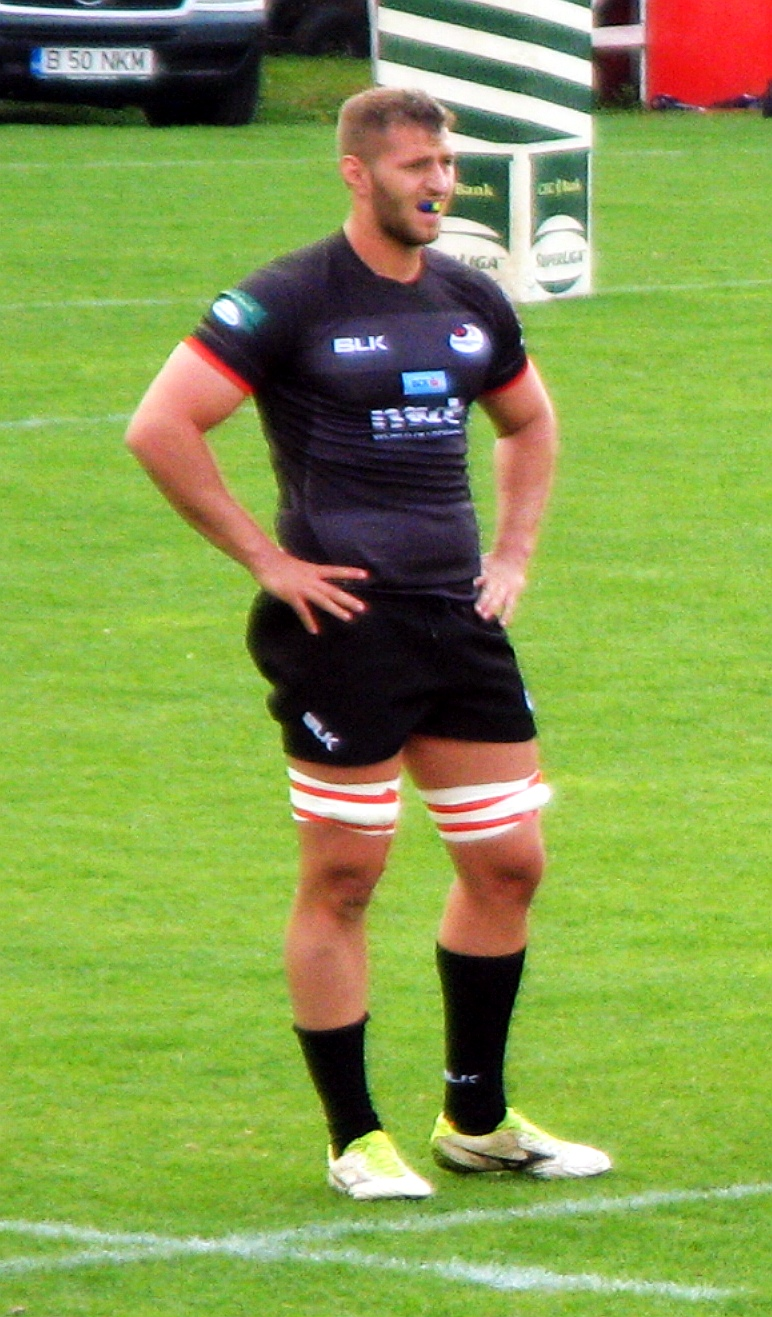
- Ionuț Mureșan playing for Timișoara Saracens in 2017
- Full name: Ionuț Lucian Mureșan
- Born: 6 October 1994 (age 32) Turda, Romania
- Height: 1.94 m (6 ft 4 1/2 in)
- Weight: 115 kg (18 st 2 lb; 254 lb)

Rugby union career
- Position: Lock
- Current team: Timișoara Saracens
Senior career
Years	Team	Apps	(Points)
2012–2013	Universitatea Cluj	?	(?)
2013–	Timișoara Saracens	15	(5)
- Correct as of 28 March 2017
International career
Years	Team	Apps	(Points)
2016–	Romania	3	(0)
- Correct as of 22 November 2017

Ionuț Lucian Mureșan (born 6 October 1994) is a Romanian rugby union football player. He plays in the lock position for professional SuperLiga club Timișoara Saracens. He also plays for Romania's national team, the Oaks, making his international debut at the autumn tests in 2016 in a match against the Los Teros.

== Career ==
Before joining Timișoara Saracens, Ionuț Mureșan played for Universitatea Cluj and Știința Petroșani as a junior.
