= Jody Rose =

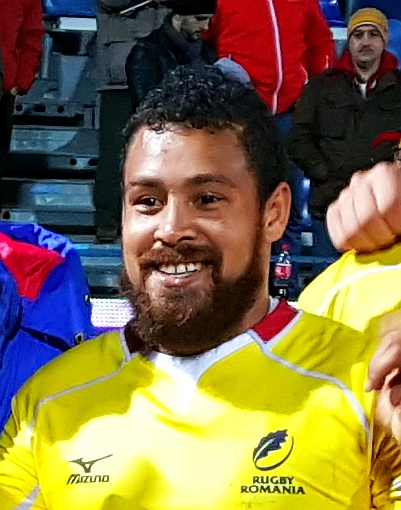
- Jody Rose in 2016 after winning the Pershing Trophy against USA
- Born: Jody Gavin Rose; 29 July 1986 (age 40) Cape Town, South Africa
- Height: 1.77 m (5 ft 9 1/2 in)
- Weight: 85 kg (13 st 5 lb; 187 lb)
- Notable relative: Earl Rose (brother)

Rugby union career
- Position: Fly-half
Provincial / State sides
Years	Team	Apps	(Points)
2006–09	Golden Lions	25	(74)
2012–2021	Timișoara Saracens	55	(61)
2022-	Știința Petroșani	3	
- Correct as of 21 June 2021
International career
Years	Team	Apps	(Points)
2008	Emerging Springboks	2	(0)
2015–	Romania	8	(5)
- Correct as of 12 November 2016

Jody Gavin Rose (born 29 July 1986) is a South African-born Romanian rugby union player. He plays in the fly-half position for amateur Liga Națională de Rugby club Știința Petroșani.

He also played for Romania's national team the Oaks.
