= Johan van Heerden =

Johannes van Heerden
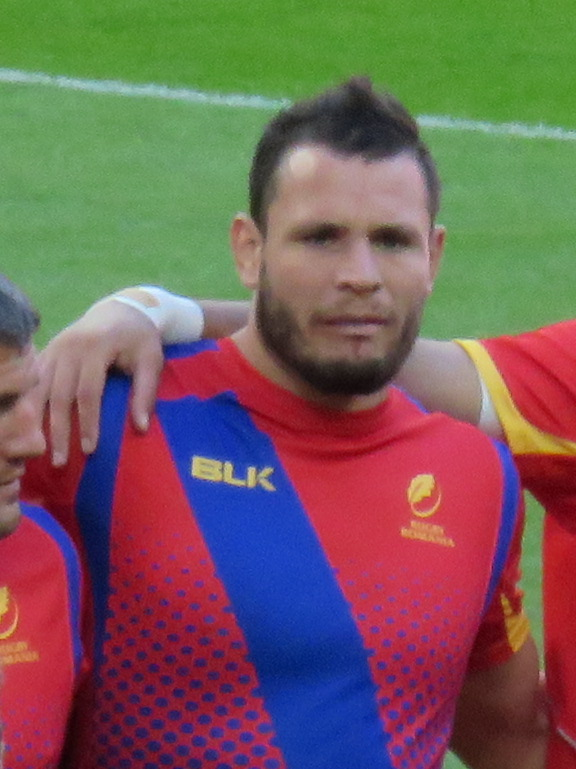
- Born: Johannes Petrus van Heerden; 9 December 1986 (age 39) Pretoria, South Africa
- Height: 1.96 m (6 ft 5 in)
- Weight: 118 kg (18 st 8 lb; 260 lb)
- School: Hercules High School
- University: University of Pretoria

Rugby union career
- Position(s): Lock, Flanker
- Correct as of 20 September 2015
Senior career
Years	Team	Apps	(Points)
2013–2015	București Wolves (Romania)	10	(0)
- Correct as of 13 August 2019
Provincial / State sides
Years	Team	Apps	(Points)
2007–2010	Pumas	33	(20)
2010–2012	Griffons	27	(5)
2013–2018	Baia Mare	38	(40)
2018	CSM București	7	(0)
2018-2019	USA Perpignan	14	(0)
2019-	CS Dinamo București		
- Correct as of 13 August 2019
International career
Years	Team	Apps	(Points)
2015–present	Romania	55	(15)
- Correct as of 20 April 2024

Johannes Petrus van Heerden (born 9 December 1986) is a Romanian rugby union player of South African background. He plays as lock, and occasionally flanker.

He plays for SuperLiga club CS Dinamo București and București based European Challenge Cup side the Wolves. Van Heerden also plays for Romania's national team the Oaks.
