= Revaz Jinchvelashvili =

Georgian rugby union player

Revaz Jintchvelashvili
- Born: 18 August 1995 (age 31) Kutaisi, Georgia
- Height: 1.76 m (5 ft 9 in)
- Weight: 78 kg (12 st 4 lb)

Rugby union career
- Position: Fly-half,
Senior career
Years	Team	Apps	(Points)
2015–	AIA Kutaisi	9	(41)
- Correct as of 11 March 2016
International career
Years	Team	Apps	(Points)
2015	Georgia U20	3	
2016–	Georgia	8	(0)
- Correct as of 19 April 2018

Revaz Jintchvelashvili (Georgian: რევაზ ჯინჭველაშვილი) (born August 18, 1995), also known as Rezi Jintchvelashvili, is a Georgian rugby union player. His position is fly-half and he currently plays for AIA Kutaisi in the Didi 10 and for the Georgia national team.

== Career ==
Jintchvelashvili made his international debut in June 2013 against the South Africa President's XV at age 17, making him the second youngest player ever to play for Georgia. Over 2014–2015 he became the all-time leading points scorer of the World Rugby U20 Trophy, including 19 points in the final of the 2015 tournament to help Georgia win promotion to the World Rugby Under 20 Championship.
