= Jack Umaga =

Romania international rugby union player

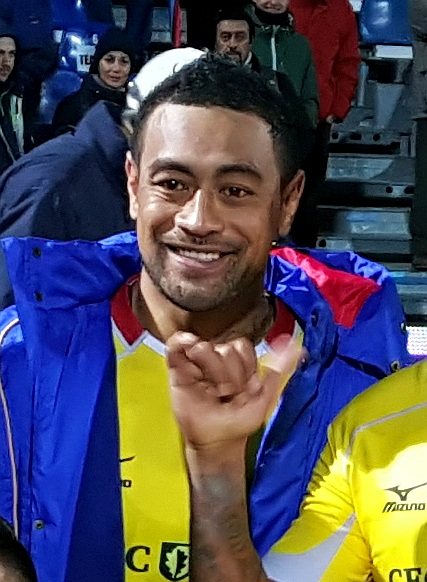
- Jack Umaga in 2016 after winning the Pershing Trophy against USA
- Full name: Jack Siaki Umaga
- Born: 18 June 1984 (age 42) Wellington, New Zealand
- Height: 1.82 m (5 ft 11 1/2 in)
- Weight: 99 kg (15 st 8 lb; 218 lb)
- Notable relative(s): Mike Umaga, Tana Umaga

Rugby union career
- Position(s): Wing, Centre
- Current team: Știința Petroșani
Senior career
Years	Team	Apps	(Points)
2013–2021	Timișoara	31	(31)
2022-	Știința Petroșani	3	(0)
- Correct as of 10 March 2017
International career
Years	Team	Apps	(Points)
2016–	Romania	17	(10)
- Correct as of 25 November 2017
National sevens team
Years	Team		Comps
2018-	Romania 7`s		2

Jack Umaga (born 18 June 1984) is a New Zealand-born Romanian rugby union football player. He plays in the wing or centre positions for amateur Liga Națională de Rugby club Știința Petroșani.

He also played for Romania's national team, the Oaks, making his international debut at the 2016 World Rugby Nations Cup in a match against the Welwitschias.

== Career ==
Jack Umaga played for Sydenhan Rugby, Canterbury B, Mid-Canterbury, Tasman Makos and most recently for Hino Motors.

After joining Timișoara, Jack Umaga won the Romanian league 4 times and the Romanian cup also 4 times. He was also selected 17 times to play for the Romanian National Team.

== Honours ==
- Timișoara
  - Liga Națională de Rugby: 2013, 2015, 2017, 2018
  - Cupa României: 2014, 2015, 2016, 2021
