= Mădălin Lemnaru =

Romania international rugby union player

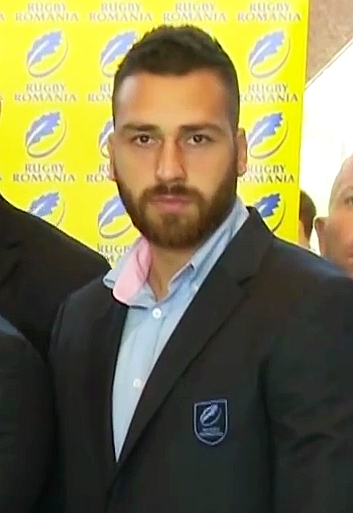
- Mădălin Lemnaru during a press conference before departing for 2015 Rugby World Cup
- Born: Mădălin Vlad Lemnaru; 26 March 1989 (age 37) Brașov, Romania
- Height: 1.89 m (6 ft 2 1/2 in)
- Weight: 95 kg (14 st 13 lb; 209 lb)

Rugby union career
- Position: Wing
Senior career
Years	Team	Apps	(Points)
2008–15	București Wolves	17	(20)
- Correct as of 5 November 2015
Provincial / State sides
Years	Team	Apps	(Points)
2008–12	Steaua București	16	(20)
2013–	Timișoara Saracens	16	(45)
- Correct as of 5 December 2015
International career
Years	Team	Apps	(Points)
2009–	Romania	32	(35)
- Correct as of 28 February 2016

Mădălin Vlad Lemnaru (born 26 March 1989) is a Romanian rugby union player. He plays in the wing and occasionally fullback position for amateur SuperLiga club Timişoara and București based European Challenge Cup side the Wolves. Dumitru also plays for Romania's national team the Oaks.

Lemnaru made his international debut in 2009 in the wing position against Spain. He played for Romania in the IRB Nations Cup and in their 2015 Rugby World Cup qualifying and previously appearing for them in the 2011 Rugby World Cup.
