= Stephen Shennan (rugby union) =

Romania international rugby union & league player

Stephen Ross Shennan
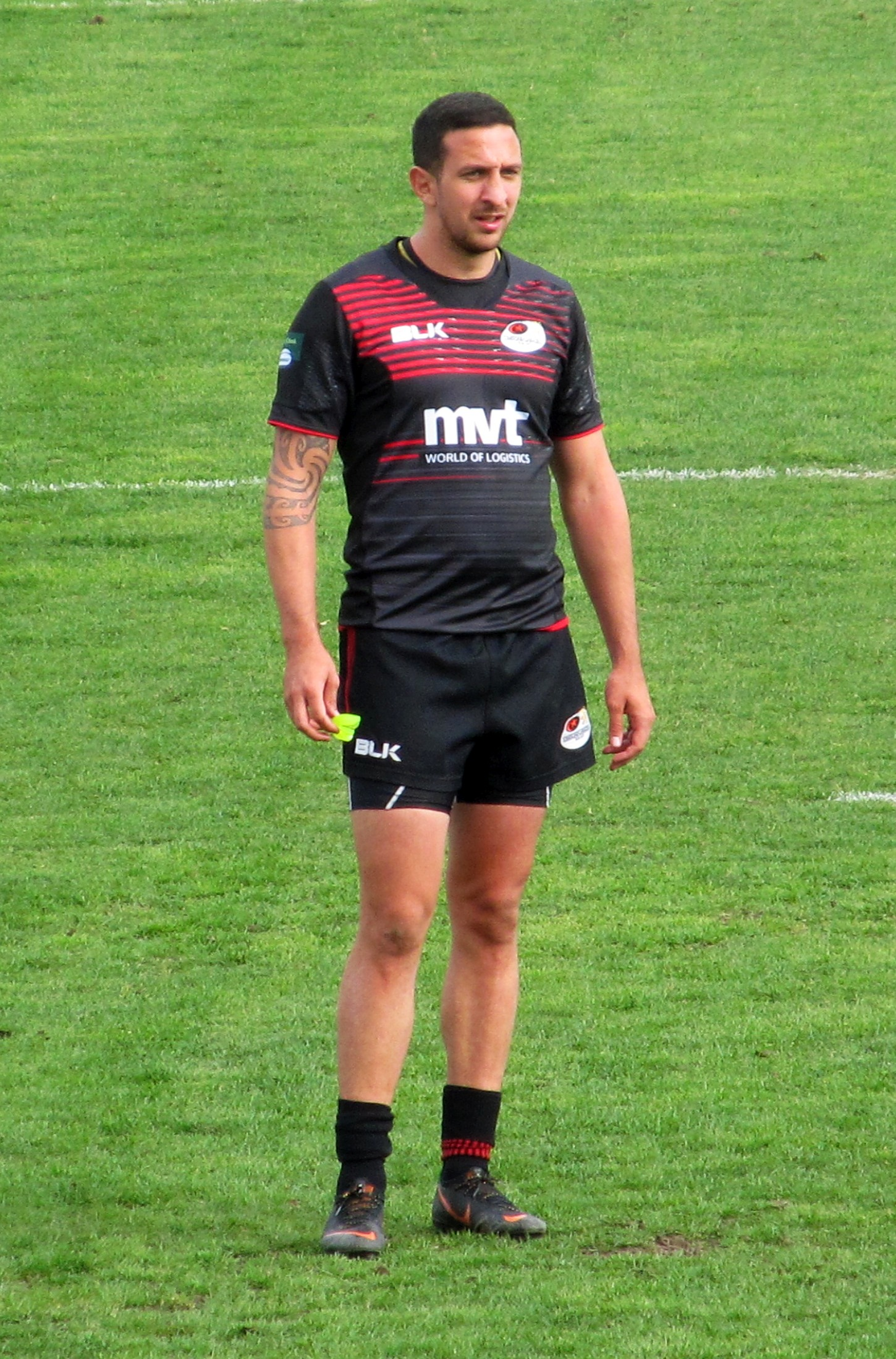
- Stephen Shennan playing for Timișoara Saracens during the 2019 Cupa României Final
- Full name: Stephen Ross Shennan
- Born: 7 January 1991 (age 35) Auckland, New Zealand
- Height: 1.86 m (6 ft 1 in)
- Weight: 90 kg (14 st 2 lb; 200 lb)

Rugby union career
- Position: Wing
- Current team: Timișoara
Senior career
Years	Team	Apps	(Points)
2013–	Timișoara	33	(90)
- Correct as of 7 May 2016
International career
Years	Team	Apps	(Points)
2016–	Romania	17	(41)
- Correct as of 16 July 2018

Stephen Ross Shennan (born 7 January 1991) is a New Zealand-born Romanian rugby union player. He plays in the wing position for professional SuperLiga club Timișoara.

== Club career ==
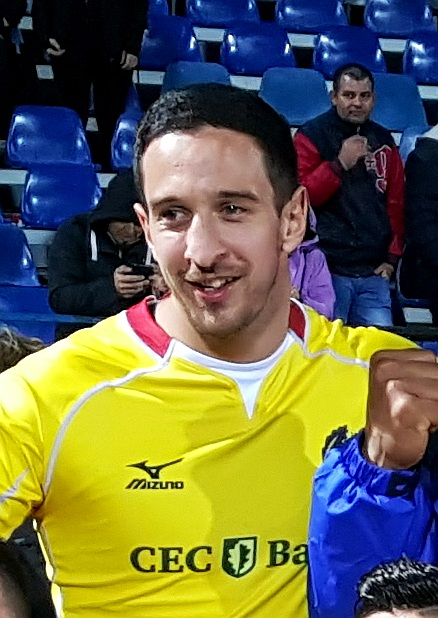
Stephen in 2016 after winning the Pershing Trophy against USA

Shennan attended Kelston Boys' High School and previously played rugby league in his early career, representing the New Zealand Māori under-19s in 2009. A member of the Te Atatu Roosters club, Shennan was named the Auckland Rugby League's rookie of the year in 2009. He later signed for the New Zealand Warriors and played in their Toyota Cup winning under-20's side in 2011.

== International career ==
He also plays for Romania's national team the Oaks, making his international debut at the 2014–16 European Nations Cup in a match against the Os Lobos.
