= Irakli Svanidze =

Georgia international rugby union player

- Born: 2 July 1996 (age 30) Tbilisi, Georgia
- Height: 1.82 m (6 ft 0 in)
- Weight: 82 kg (12 st 13 lb; 181 lb)

Rugby union career
- Position: Fullback
Senior career
Years	Team	Apps	(Points)
2016–	Jiki Gori	45	(25)
- Correct as of 18/07/2015
International career
Years	Team	Apps	(Points)
2015–	Georgia	2	(0)
- Correct as of 18/07/2015

Irakli Svanidze (born July 2, 1996) is a Georgian rugby union player. His position is fullback, and he currently plays for Jiki Gori in the Georgia Championship and the Georgia national team. In September 2019, he married Mariam Burjaliani.
