= Tornike Mataradze =

Georgian rugby union player

- Born: October 18, 1996 (age 30) Tbilisi, Georgia
- Height: 1.80 m (5 ft 11 in)
- Weight: 110 kg (17 st 5 lb)

Rugby union career
- Position: Loosehead Prop
Senior career
Years	Team	Apps	(Points)
2016-	Lyon	3	(0)
- Correct as of 17 August 2016
International career
Years	Team	Apps	(Points)
2015-2016	Georgia U20	16	(20)
2017-	Georgia	6	(0)
- Correct as of 19 April 2018

Tornike Mataradze is a Georgian rugby union player. He plays for Georgia and for Lyon in the Top 14.
