= Soso Bekoshvili =

Georgian rugby union player

- Born: 3 November 1993 (age 33) Tbilisi, Georgia
- Height: 1.83 m (6 ft 0 in)
- Weight: 120 kg (260 lb; 18 st 13 lb)

Rugby union career
- Position: Prop
Senior career
| Years | Team | Apps | (Points) |
| 2014-2015 | Tbilisi | | |
| 2015-2016 | SO Chambéry | | |
| 2016- | CA Brive | 66 | (20) |
- Correct as of 2 June 2016
International career
| Years | Team | Apps | (Points) |
| 2017- | Georgia | 11 | (0) |
- Correct as of 25 November 2017

Soso Bekoshvili is a Georgian rugby union player. He currently plays as a prop for CA Brive in the Top 14.
