= Constantin Pristăvița =

Romanian rugby union player

Constantin Pristaviță
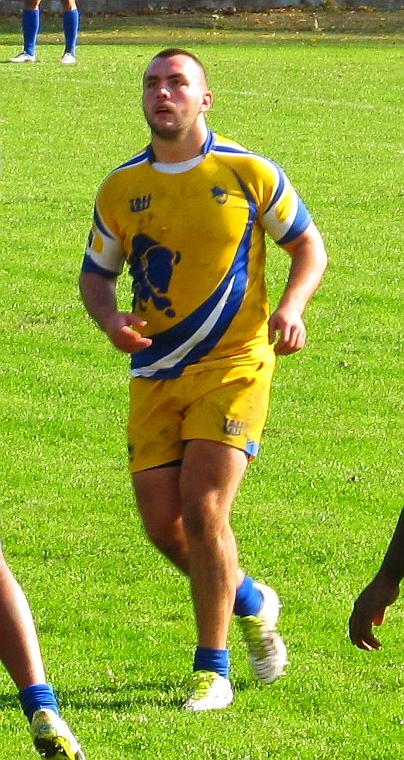
- Constantin Pristaviță during a SuperLiga match in 2015
- Born: Constantin Pristaviță-Mardare; 23 May 1993 (age 33)
- Height: 1.89 m (6 ft 2 1/2 in)
- Weight: 108 kg (17 st 0 lb; 238 lb)

Rugby union career
- Position: Prop
Senior career
Years	Team	Apps	(Points)
2012–15	București Wolves	11	(0)
- Correct as of 24 January 2015
Provincial / State sides
Years	Team	Apps	(Points)
2012	Steaua București	1	(0)
2013–	Baia Mare	33	(10)
- Correct as of 11 June 2016
International career
Years	Team	Apps	(Points)
2013–	Romania	32	(0)
- Correct as of 2 July 2017

Constantin Pristaviță-Mardare (born 23 May 1993) is a Romanian rugby union player. He plays in the prop position for amateur SuperLiga club Baia Mare and București based European Challenge Cup side the Wolves. Pristaviță also plays for Romania's national team the Oaks.

Pristaviță made his international debut in 2013 in the prop position against Russia. He played for Romania in the IRB Nations Cup and in their 2015 Rugby World Cup qualifying before appearing for them in their 2013 end of year tour.
