= Iñaki Villanueva =

- Full name: Iñaki Villanueva Martín
- Born: 10 February 1991 (age 35) El Puerto de Santa María, Spain
- Height: 1.98 m (6 ft 6 in)
- Weight: 103 kg (227 lb; 16 st 3 lb)

Rugby union career
National sevens team
| Years | Team | Comps |
- Spain

Iñaki Villanueva Martín (born 10 February 1991) is a Spanish rugby sevens player. He competed for Spain 7s at the 2016 Summer Olympics in Brazil. He was part of the squad that won the 2016 Men's Rugby Sevens Final Olympic Qualification Tournament in Monaco and he played in the Olympic tournament.

His brother is Alejandro Villanueva, a former American football offensive tackle in the National Football League (NFL).
