= Giorgi Koshadze =

Georgian international rugby union player

- Born: 9 February 1996 (age 30) Rustavi, Georgia
- Height: 1.84 m (6 ft 0 in)
- Weight: 84 kg (13 st 3 lb)

Rugby union career
- Position: Centre
Senior career
Years	Team	Apps	(Points)
2015-	Rustavi Kharebi	23	(30)
- Correct as of 19 June 2017
International career
Years	Team	Apps	(Points)
2014–2016	Georgia U20	11	(5)
2016-	Georgia	11	(22)
- Correct as of 16 November 2018

Giorgi Koshadze (born February 9, 1996) is a Georgian rugby union player. His position is centre, and he currently plays for Rustavi Kharebi in the Georgia Championship and the Georgia national team. He was named in Georgia's squad for the 2016 November test series against Japan, Samoa and Scotland.
