= Craig Felston =

Moldovan international rugby union player (born 1993)

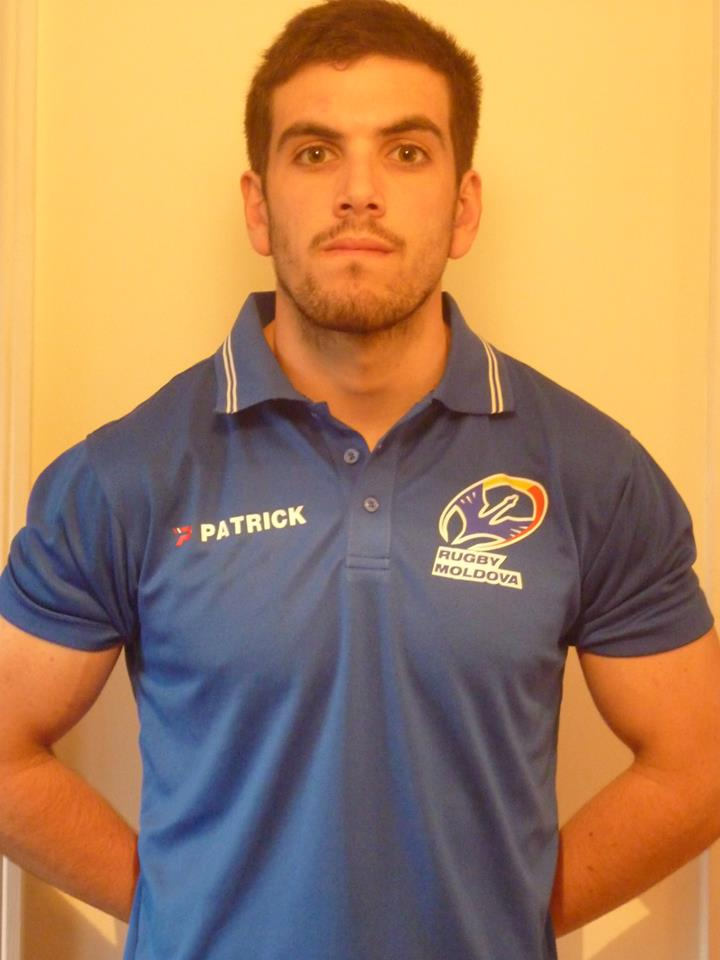
- Felston in 2013
- Born: 24 March 1993 (age 33) Peterborough, England
- Height: 1.86 m (6 ft 1 in)
- School: Stamford School
- University: Kingston University

Rugby union career
- Position(s): Fly-half, Centre, Fullback
Amateur team(s)
Years	Team	Apps	(Points)
2011- 2012	Esher		
- Correct as of 2014 - Stade Domont
International career
Years	Team	Apps	(Points)
2013-	Moldova	9	(47)
National sevens team
Years	Team		Comps
2013-	Moldova		2 tournaments 10 games

Craig Felston (born 24 March 1993) is an English-born former Moldovan rugby player. He played for the Moldovan National rugby team. He is eligible to represent Moldova through his Moldovan born grandfather.

Predominantly a fly-half, but comfortable at inside Centre and Fullback, the former Stamford School pupil played regionally for the East Midlands u18 team in 2010, and as captain of the 2011 East Midlands u19's Sevens team. Performances in these teams earned him a place in the Esher Rugby Club's academy for the 2011–2012 season, where he played in his favoured position of fly-half and went on to be the development team's leading points scorer.

Marked for development at the fly-half role for the club early in the season after some praised performances with the boot and backline organisation, however progress was halted due to the arrival of Fijian international and former Bath player Nicky Little halfway through the season, limiting the opportunities for game time.

After parting ways with Esher to further his studies at Kingston University, Felston was invited for trials with the South East England Students Rugby league team. He was later called up to the Moldovan Sevens team in May 2013 and made his first international appearance in the FIRA-AER Sevens Circuit in Israel later that month, before going on to represent the side at further tournaments. The player was set to be included in the u20's squad for the u20 European Championship in late August 2013 in preparation for the upcoming 2015 Rugby World Cup qualifiers however was injured and missed this tournament. In November 2013 Felston made his debut for the Moldovan senior team against Sweden in the flyhalf position where he scored 10 points in the 50–20 win. He was then selected for their following game against Germany where Moldova were victorious again, beating their opponents 30-15 and Felston scoring 10 points.

Craig Felston went on to score six points (three conversions) against Poland in a 21 - 12 victory on 5 April 2014, eight points (four conversions) during the 28 - 8 victory against Ukraine on 12 April 2014 and two points (one conversion) in the defeat against the Czech Republic, 19 - 37, on 26 April 2014.

From July 2014 Craig Felston signed for Stade Domontois, in Federale 1.

Felston retired from rugby after suffering repeated knee injuries but featured for the Moldovan team 2 more times after retiring in 2017 and 2018 against Portugal on both occasions and was featured (August 2020) in the Rugby World Magazine alongside former teammates.
