= Valentin Popârlan =

Romania international rugby union player

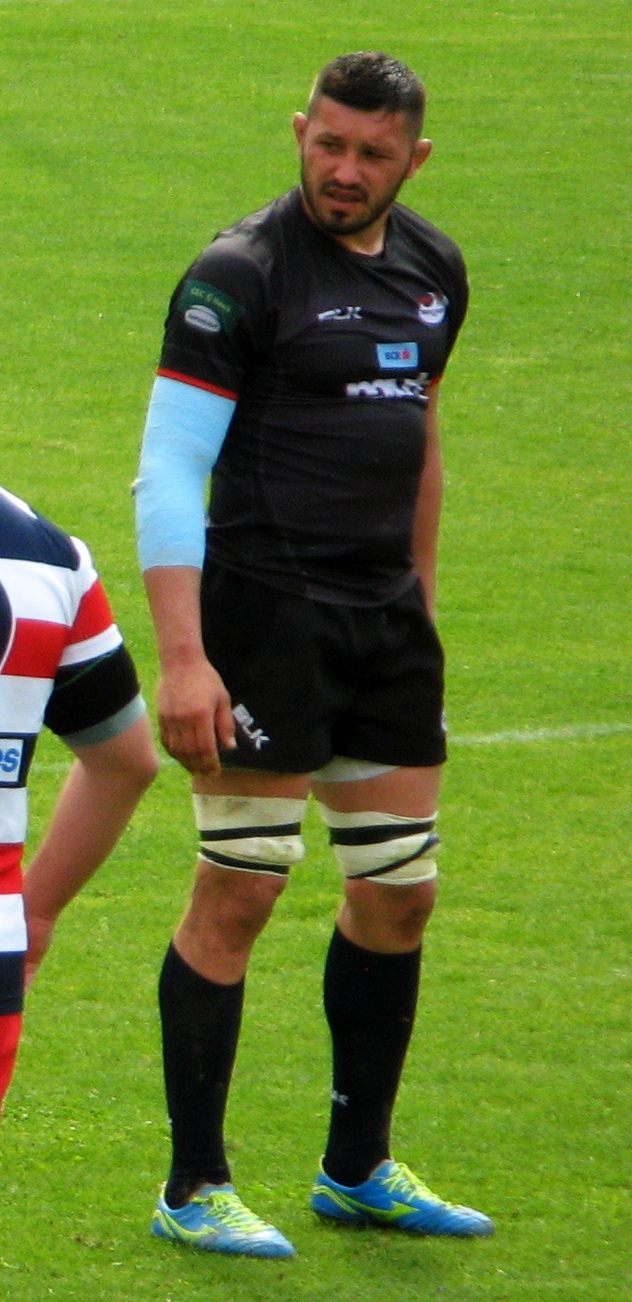
- Valentin Popârlan playing for Timișoara Saracens in 2017
- Born: 12 June 1987 (age 39) Viziru, Romania
- Height: 1.96 m (6 ft 5 in)
- Weight: 117 kg (18 st 6 lb; 258 lb)

Rugby union career
- Position(s): Lock, Flanker
Senior career
Years	Team	Apps	(Points)
2013–14	București Wolves	6	(10)
Provincial / State sides
Years	Team	Apps	(Points)
2007–08	Steaua București	21	(5)
2012–	Timișoara Saracens	40	(30)
- Correct as of 5 December 2015
International career
Years	Team	Apps	(Points)
2007–	Romania	75	(55)
- Correct as of 25 November 2017

Valentin Popârlan (born 12 June 1987) is a Romanian rugby union player. He plays in the lock and occasionally flanker position for professional SuperLiga club Timișoara and București based European Challenge Cup side the Wolves. Popârlan also plays for Romania's national team the Oaks.

Popârlan made his international debut in 2007 as a substitute against Namibia. He played for Romania in the IRB Nations Cup and in their 2011 Rugby World Cup qualifying before appearing for them in the 2011 Rugby World Cup. He played four Tests at the World Cup, three as a substitute against Scotland, Argentina and Georgia and one in number four lock position against England.
