= Zurabi Zhvania =

Zurab Zhvania
- Born: Zurab Zhvania; 23 September 1991 (age 35) Poti, Georgia
- Height: 1.79 m (5 ft 10 1/2 in)
- Weight: 125 kg (19 st 10 lb; 276 lb)

Rugby union career
- Position(s): Loosehead Prop, Hooker
- Current team: Chicago Hounds
Youth career
- 20??–2009: Poti
- 2009-2010: Aia Kutaisi
- 2010-2012: Stade Français
Senior career
Years	Team	Apps	(Points)
2012-2018	Stade Français	103	(40)
2018-2021	Wasps	35	(15)
2021-2023	FC Grenoble	24	(15)
2024-	Chicago Hounds	5	(10)
- Correct as of 11 August 2024
International career
Years	Team	Apps	(Points)
2013-	Georgia	36	(50)
- Correct as of 16 November 2018

Zurab Zhvania (born 23 September 1991 in Georgia) is a Georgian rugby union player. He plays prop or hooker for Georgia on international level.

On the 9 March 2013 Zhvania made his debut for Georgia against Spain in the European Nations Cup.

== Career statistics ==
As of 11 August 2024.

Club	League	Season	Domestic League				European Cup				Domestic Cup				Total			
Club	League	Season	Apps	Tries	Yel	Red	Apps	Tries	Yel	Red	Apps	Tries	Yel	Red	Apps	Tries	Yel	Red
Stade Français	Top 14	2012–13	5	0	0	0	7	0	0	0	–				13	0	0	0
Stade Français	Top 14	2013–14	3	0	0	0	5	1	0	0	–				8	1	0	0
Stade Français	Top 14	2014–15	15	2	1	0	6	1	0	0	–				20	3	1	0
Stade Français	Top 14	2015–16	12	0	0	0	5	1	0	0	–				17	1	0	0
Stade Français	Top 14	2016–17	13	0	0	0	10	1	0	0	–				23	1	0	0
Stade Français	Top 14	2017–18	16	2	1	0	6	0	0	0	–				22	2	1	0
Total			64	4	2	0	39	4	1	0	–				103	8	2	0
Wasps	Premiership	2018–19	17	2	0	0	6	1	0	0	0	0	0	0	23	3	0	0
Wasps	Premiership	2019–20	5	0	0	0	3	0	0	0	3	0	0	0	11	0	0	0
Wasps	Premiership	2020–21	0	0	0	0	1	0	0	0	0	0	0	0	1	0	0	0
Total			22	2	0	0	10	1	0	0	3	0	0	0	35	3	0	0
FC Grenoble	Pro D2	2021–22	17	2	0	0	–				–				17	2	0	0
FC Grenoble	Pro D2	2022–23	7	1	0	0	–				–				7	1	0	0
Total			24	3	0	0	–				–				24	3	0	0
Chicago Hounds	MLR	2024	5	2	0	0	–				–				5	2	0	0
Career total			110	9	2	0	49	5	1	0	3	0	0	0	167	16	0	0
