= Valentin Calafeteanu =

Romanian rugby union player

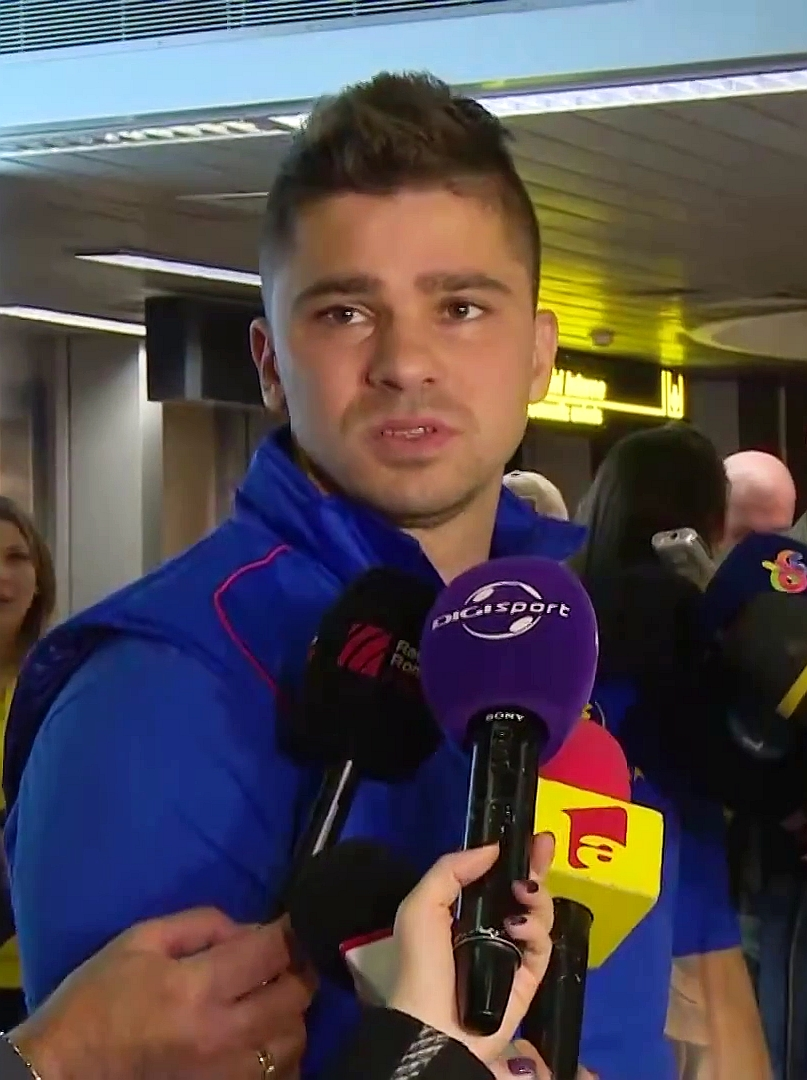
- Calafeteanu in October 2015
- Born: Valentin Nicolae Calafeteanu; 25 January 1985 (age 41) Bucharest, Romania
- Height: 1.82 m (6 ft 0 in)
- Weight: 85 kg (187 lb)

Rugby union career
- Position: Scrum-half
- Correct as of 2015
International career
Years	Team	Apps	(Points)
2004–	Romania	100	(233)
- Correct as of 1 May 2019

Valentin Nicolae Calafeteanu (born 25 January 1985) is a Romanian rugby union player. His position on the field is scrum-half.

He has played for Dinamo Bucarest (2004–09), RCM UVT Timişoara (2010–17) and CSM Bucharest (2017–19).

Playing for Dinamo, Calafeteanu became two times National Champion (2007, 2008) and won twice the National Cup.

Alongside RCM UVT Timișoara, Calafeteanu captured 9 major titles in his career, becoming 4 times Romanian Rugby Cup champion (2011, 2014, 2015, 2016), 4 times Romanian Rugby Superliga champion (2012, 2013, 2015, 2017) and one time King's Cup champion (2015). He also played for the Bucharest Wolves team.

Aged only 19, Calafeteanu had his debut for Romania on 20 November 2004, in a friendly game against Japan, contributing to a 25–10 win.

Calafeteanu holds 100 caps for Romania, with 11 tries, 32 conversions, 37 penalties and 1 drop goal scored, on an aggregate of 233 points. He won the Rugby Europe Championship in 2006 & 2017. He played all the four games, three of them as a substitute, at the 2007 Rugby World Cup finals, where he scored a conversion in the 14–10 win over Portugal. He was called for the 2011 Rugby World Cup, playing in three games . He was called once again for the 2015 Rugby World Cup, where he played in all the four games and scored a penalty against Ireland. He also played in the 2019 Rugby World Cup, which saw Romania qualifying but being disqualified for using irregular players.
