= Giorgi Tetrashvili =

- Born: 31 August 1993 (age 33) Tbilisi, Georgia
- Height: 1.77 m (5 ft 10 in)
- Weight: 112 kg (17 st 9 lb)

Rugby union career
- Position: Prop
Senior career
Years	Team	Apps	(Points)
2015-2021	Agen	105	(10)
2021-	Perpignan	27	(0)
- Correct as of 28/06/2017
International career
Years	Team	Apps	(Points)
2013–	Georgia	10	(0)
- Correct as of 25/05/2018

Giorgi Tetrashvili (born 31 August 1993) is a professional rugby union player from Georgia. His position is prop, and he currently plays for Perpignan in the Top 14 and the Georgia national team.
