= David Barrera Howarth =

- Full name: David Barrera-Howarth
- Born: 5 July 1989 (age 37) Seville, Spain
- Height: 6 ft 0 in (183 cm)
- Weight: 264 lb (120 kg)

Rugby union career
- Position: Lock
International career
Years	Team	Apps	(Points)
2010–20	Spain	38	(10)

David Barrera-Howarth (born 5 July 1989) is a Spanish former rugby union player.

Barrera was born in Seville and has English ancestry on one side of his family.

A lock, Barrera trained at Ciencias Sevilla until 2007, when he joined French club Stade Montois. He got his start in French senior rugby in 2012 with Stade Langonnais. In 2016–17, Barrera had a stint in the Pro D2 competing for RC Vannes. He has otherwise played in France's amateur Fédérale 1 competition.

Barrera represented Spain's national under-17s team at the age of 15. Between 2010 and 2020, Barrera gained 38 caps for the senior team, featuring as a lock and occasional flanker.

== See also ==
- List of Spain national rugby union players
