= Brad Linklater =

New Zealand-born international rugby player (born 1985)

- Full name: Bradley Dean Linklater
- Born: 16 May 1985 (age 41) Whangārei, New Zealand
- Height: 6 ft 1 in (185 cm)
- Weight: 207 lb (94 kg)
- Notable relative: Scott Linklater (brother)

Rugby union career
- Position: Utility back
International career
| Years | Team | Apps | (Points) |
| 2015–2021 | Spain | 35 | (271) |

Bradley Dean Linklater (born 16 May 1985) is a New Zealand-born former international rugby union player.

== Biography ==
Born in Whangārei, Linklater is the younger brother of Chiefs and NZ Maori hooker Scott Linklater.

Linklater, a former Auckland University player, was a NZ Universities representative centre and first five-eighth. He got recruited to play for Spanish club Getxo Artea in 2010, by their New Zealand-born coach Bryce Bevin. Between 2015 and 2021, Linklater competed in international rugby with Spain, most often playing fullback. He played for Alcobendas from 2016 to 2020, before finishing his career back at Getxo Artea.

As of 2023, Linklater is the High Performance Coordinator for the Spanish Rugby Federation.

== See also ==
- List of Spain national rugby union players
