= 2021 Rugby Europe Championship =

- Date: 6 March 2021 – 18 December 2021
- Countries: Georgia; Netherlands; Portugal; Spain; Romania; Russia

Tournament statistics
- Champions: Georgia (13th title)
- Grand Slam: Georgia (10th title)
- Antim Cup: Georgia (14th title)
- Kiseleff Cup: Russia (1st title)
- Matches played: 15
- Attendance: 35,339 (2,356 per match)
- Tries scored: 96 (6.4 per match)
- Top point scorer(s): (Portugal) Samuel Marques (74 points)
- Top try scorer(s): (Portugal) Raffaele Storti (7 tries)
- Official website: 2021 Rugby Europe Championship

The 2021 Rugby Europe Championship was the 5th Rugby Europe Championship, the annual rugby union competition contested by the national teams of Georgia, Portugal, Romania, Russia, Spain and the Netherlands (who promoted to the Championship after defeating Belgium in the promotion/relegation play-off of the 2020 Rugby Europe Championship), and the 52nd edition of the competition (including all its previous incarnations as FIRA Tournament, Rugby Union European Cup, FIRA Nations Cup, FIRA Trophy and European Nations Cup). Due to the COVID-19 pandemic, the tournament spanned from March to December, compared to previous editions where the tournament would have been held between February and March.

This year's edition of the Rugby Europe Championship doubles as the first year of the 2023 Rugby World Cup qualifiers for the European region, where the winner and runner-up of the two-year cycle automatically qualify to the tournament as Europe 1 and Europe 2 respectively while the team in third place advances to the final qualification tournament as Europe 3.

== Participants ==
Nation	Stadium			Head coach	Captain
Nation	Home stadium	Capacity	Location	Head coach	Captain
Georgia	Mikheil Meskhi Stadium; Caucasus Arena	27,223; 1,000	Tbilisi; Telavi	(Georgia (country)) Levan Maisashvili	Merab Sharikadze
Netherlands	NRCA Stadium	7,000	Amsterdam	(New Zealand) Zane Gardiner	Dirk Danen
Portugal	Estádio de Rugby Jamor	2,500	Lisbon	(France) Patrice Lagisquet	Tomás Appleton
Romania	Arcul de Triumf Stadium; Stadionul Steaua II	8,207; 2,000	Bucharest	(England) Andy Robinson	André Gorin
Russia	Fisht Olympic Stadium; Kaliningrad Stadium; Nizhny Novgorod Stadium	47,659; 35,212; 44,899	Sochi; Kaliningrad; Nizhny Novgorod	(Wales) Lyn Jones	Vitaly Zhivatov
Spain	Estadio Nacional Complutense	12,400	Madrid	(Spain) Santiago Santos	Fernando López

== Table ==
Champions

Pos.	Team	Games				Points			Tries			TBP	LBP	GS	Table points
Pos.	Team	Played	Won	Drawn	Lost	For	Against	Diff	For	Against	Diff	TBP	LBP	GS	Table points
1	Georgia	5	5	0	0	153	73	+80	22	6	+16	3	0	1	24
2	Romania	5	3	0	2	136	104	+32	16	9	+7	1	1	0	14
3	Portugal	5	3	0	2	196	139	+57	25	20	+5	1	1	0	14
4	Russia	5	2	0	3	97	142	−45	11	18	−7	1	0	0	9
5	Spain	5	2	0	3	164	109	+55	21	14	+7	2	2	0	7*
6	Netherlands	5	0	0	5	73	252	−179	10	38	−28	0	0	0	0
Source - Points were awarded to the teams as follows: Win – 4 points | Draw – 2 points | At least 3 more tries than opponent – 1 point | Loss within 7 points – 1 point | Completing a Grand Slam – 1 point * deducted points

== Fixtures ==
=== Week 1 ===
6 March 2021
15:00 MSK (UTC+03)

Russia	18–13	Romania (1 LBP)
Pen: Gaisin 2', 24', 45', 57', 64', 72'	Report	Try: Antonescu 7'; Con: Vlaicu 8'; Pen: Vlaicu 21', 76'

Fisht Olympic Stadium, Sochi
Attendance: 2,895
Referee: Shota Tevzadze (Georgia)

LP	1	Valery Morozov	(substituted off) 76'
HK	2	Stanislav Sel'skiy	(substituted off) 59'
TP	3	Kirill Gotovtsev	(substituted off) 19'
LL	4	Andrei Ostrikov
RL	5	Bogdan Fedotko
BF	6	Nikita Vavilin
OF	7	Vladislav Perestyak	(substituted off) 45'
N8	8	Victor Gresev (c)
SH	9	Konstantin Uzunov
FH	10	Ramil Gaisin
LW	11	Vasily Artemyev
IC	12	Kirill Golosnitsky
OC	13	German Davydov
RW	14	Andrei Karzanov
FB	15	Alexandr Budychenko
Replacements:
HK	16	Shamil Magomedov	(substituted on) 59'
PR	17	Evgeny Mishechkin	(substituted on) 76'
PR	18	Vladimir Podrezov	(substituted on) 19'
LK	19	German Silenko
FL	20	Anton Sychev	(substituted on) 45'
SH	21	Alexandr Belosludtsev
FH	22	Yuri Kushnarev
WG	23	Khetag Dzobelov
Coach:
Lyn Jones

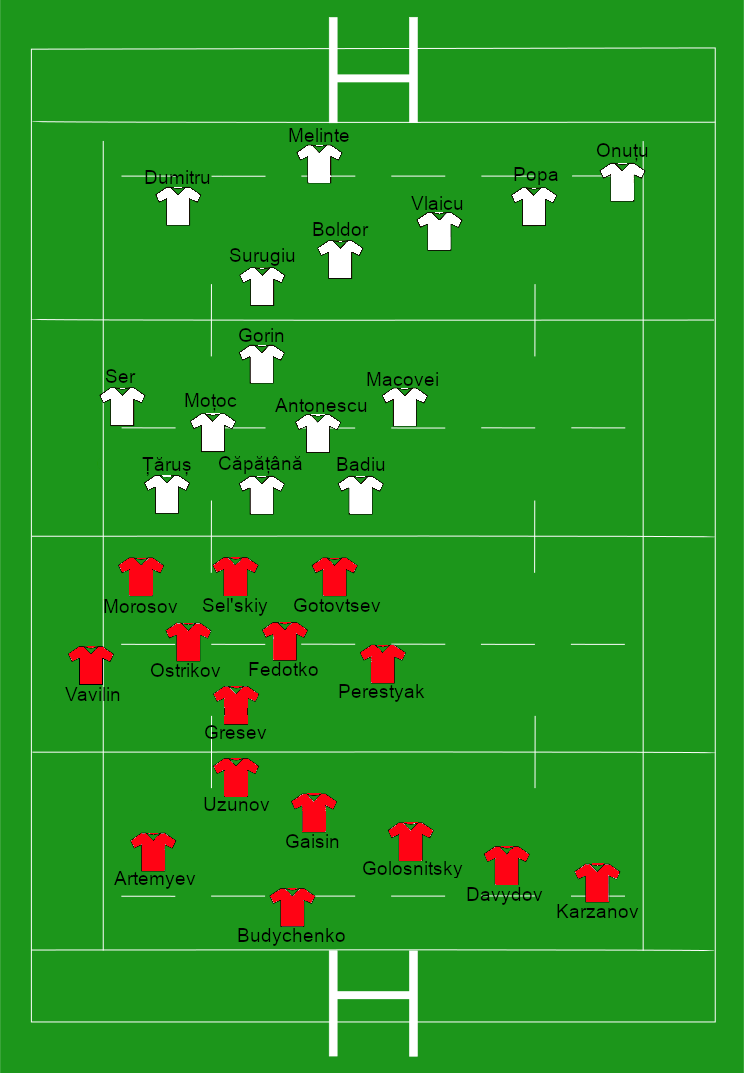

LP	1	Ionel Badiu	(substituted off) 41'
HK	2	Eugen Căpățână	(substituted off) 76'
TP	3	Alexandru Țăruș	(substituted off) 58'
LL	4	Marius Antonescu
RL	5	Adrian Moțoc	(yellow card) 71'
BF	6	Mihai Macovei (c)
OF	7	Dragoș Ser	(substituted off) 54'
N8	8	André Gorin
SH	9	Florin Surugiu
FH	10	Tudor Boldor
LW	11	Nicolas Onuțu
IC	12	Florin Vlaicu
OC	13	Vlăduț Popa
RW	14	Ionuț Dumitru
FB	15	Ionel Melinte	(substituted off) 73'
Replacements:
HK	16	Ovidiu Cojocaru	(substituted on) 76'
PR	17	Alexandru Savin	(substituted on) 41'
PR	18	Alex Gordaș	(substituted on) 58'
LK	19	Ionuț Mureșan
FL	20	Cristi Chirică	(substituted on) 54'
SH	21	Gabriel Rupanu
FB	22	Daniel Plai	(substituted on) 73'
FB	23	Paul Popoaia
Coach:
Andy Robinson

Touch judges:
Eugeniu Procopi (Moldova)
Saba Abulashvili (Georgia)
Television match official:
Tornike Gvirjishvili (Georgia)

6 March 2021
15:00 WET (UTC+00)

Portugal	16–29	Georgia (1 TBP)
Try: Marta 39'; Con: Marques 40'; Pen: Marques 5', 14', 44'	Report	Try: Modebadze 18'; Bregvadze 29'; Melikidze 50'; Kharaishvili 66'; Jalaghonia 80+5'; Con: Matiashvili 51', 80+6'

Estádio de Rugby Jamor, Lisbon
Attendance: 0
Referee: Gianluca Gnecchi (Italy)

LP	1	Geoffrey Moïse	43' to 51'	(substituted off) 65'
HK	2	Mike Tadjer	(substituted off) 75'
TP	3	Diogo Hasse Ferreira	(substituted off) 70'
LL	4	Rafael Simões
RL	5	José Rebelo de Andrade	(substituted off) 55'
BF	6	João Granate
OF	7	José Madeira
N8	8	Luigi Dias	(substituted off) 60'
SH	9	Samuel Marques	(substituted off) 80'
FH	10	Jerónimo Portela
LW	11	Rodrigo Marta
IC	12	Tomás Appleton (c)	(yellow card) 65' to 75'
OC	13	José Lima
RW	14	Raffaele Storti
FB	15	Dany Antunes	(substituted off) 75'
Replacements:
PR	16	David Costa	(substituted on) 43' (substituted off) 51'	(substituted on) 65'
HK	17	Nuno Mascarenhas	(substituted on) 75'
PR	18	Thibault Nardi	(substituted on) 70'
LK	19	Francisco Sousa	(substituted on) 55'
N8	20	Eric dos Santos	(substituted on) 60'
SH	21	Théo Entraygues	(substituted on) 80'
FH	22	Jorge Abecasis
FB	23	Nuno Sousa Guedes	(substituted on) 75'
Coach:
Patrice Lagisquet

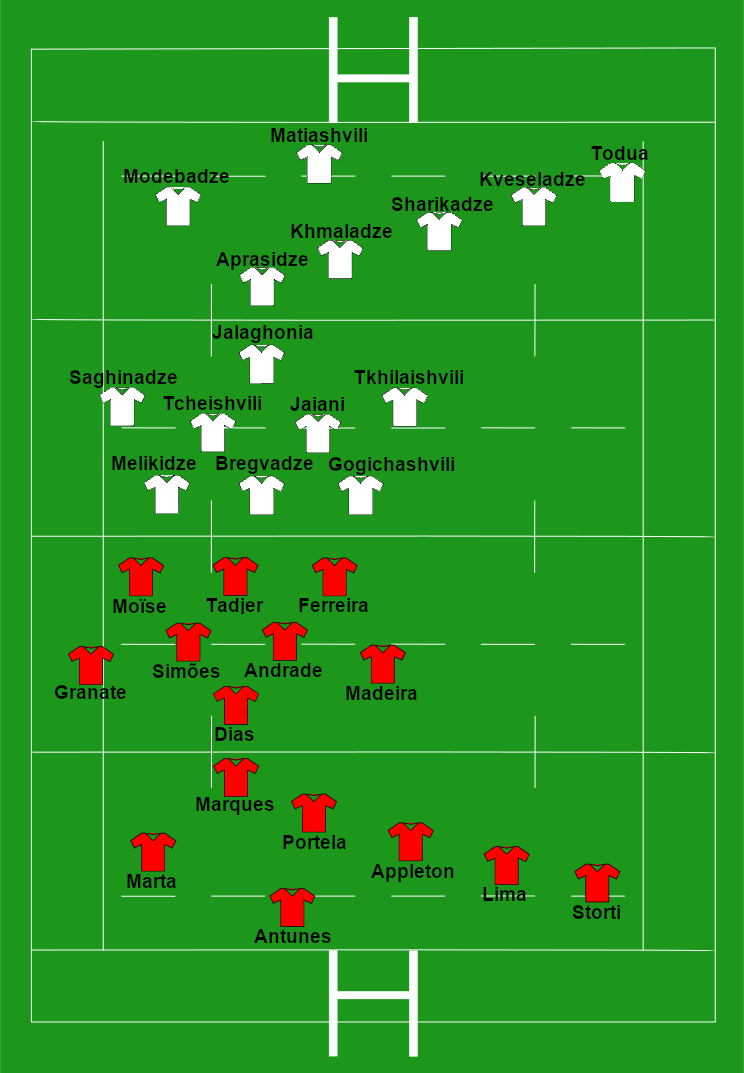

LP	1	Guram Gogichashvili	(substituted off) 60'
HK	2	Jaba Bregvadze	(substituted off) 53'
TP	3	Giorgi Melikidze	(substituted off) 53'
LL	4	Lasha Jaiani
RL	5	Nodar Tcheishvili	(substituted off) 78'
BF	6	Giorgi Tkhilaishvili	(yellow card) 55' to 65' (substituted off) 65'
OF	7	Beka Saghinadze
N8	8	Tornike Jalaghonia
SH	9	Gela Aprasidze	(substituted off) 66'
FH	10	Lasha Khmaladze
LW	11	Alexander Todua
IC	12	Merab Sharikadze (c)
OC	13	Giorgi Kveseladze	(yellow card) 35' to 45'
RW	14	Mirian Modebadze	(substituted off) 67'
FB	15	Soso Matiashvili
Replacements:
HK	16	Shalva Mamukashvili	(substituted on) 53'
PR	17	Beka Gigashvili	(substituted on) 60'
PR	18	Giorgi Kharaishvili	(substituted on) 53'
LK	19	Davit Gigauri	(substituted on) 78'
FL	20	Irakli Tskhadadze	(substituted on) 65'
SH	21	Mikheil Alania	(substituted on) 66'
FH	22	Giorgi Babunashvili
WG	23	Demur Tapladze	(substituted on) 67'
Coach:
Levan Maisashvili

Touch judges:
Federico Vedovelli (Italy)
Filippo Bertelli (Italy)
Television match official:
Stefano Roscini (Italy)

=== Week 2 ===
13 March 2021
13:00 WET (UTC+00)

(1 LBP) Portugal	27–28	Romania
Try: Antunes 10'; Portela 34'; Storti 66'; Con: Marques 11', 35', 67'; Pen: Marques 17', 60'	Report	Try: Savin 49'; Onuțu 74'; Cojocaru 79'; Con: Melinte 75', 80'; Pen: Vlaicu 4', 21', 29'

Estádio de Rugby Jamor, Lisbon
Attendance: 30
Referee: Luc Ramos (France)

LP	1	Francisco Fernandes	(substituted off) 71'
HK	2	Mike Tadjer	(yellow card) 40+4' to 54'
TP	3	Anthony Alves	(substituted off) 53'
LL	4	Rafael Simões	(substituted off) 49'
RL	5	José Rebelo de Andrade	(yellow card) 3' to 13' 32' to 39'
BF	6	João Granate
OF	7	José Madeira
N8	8	Manuel Picão
SH	9	Samuel Marques
FH	10	Jerónimo Portela	(substituted off) 40'
LW	11	Rodrigo Marta
IC	12	Tomás Appleton (c)
OC	13	José Lima
RW	14	Raffaele Storti
FB	15	Dany Antunes	(substituted off) 40+4' (substituted on) 49' (substituted off) 53'
Replacements:
PR	16	David Costa	(substituted on) 71'
HK	17	Duarte Diniz	(substituted on) 40+4' (substituted off) 49'
PR	18	Geoffrey Moïse	(substituted on) 53'
LK	19	Eric dos Santos	(substituted on) 32' (substituted off) 39' (substituted on) 49' (yellow card) 79'
FL	20	Francisco Sousa
SH	21	Théo Entraygues
FH	22	Jorge Abecasis	(substituted on) 40'
FB	23	Nuno Sousa Guedes	(substituted on) 53'
Coach:
Patrice Lagisquet

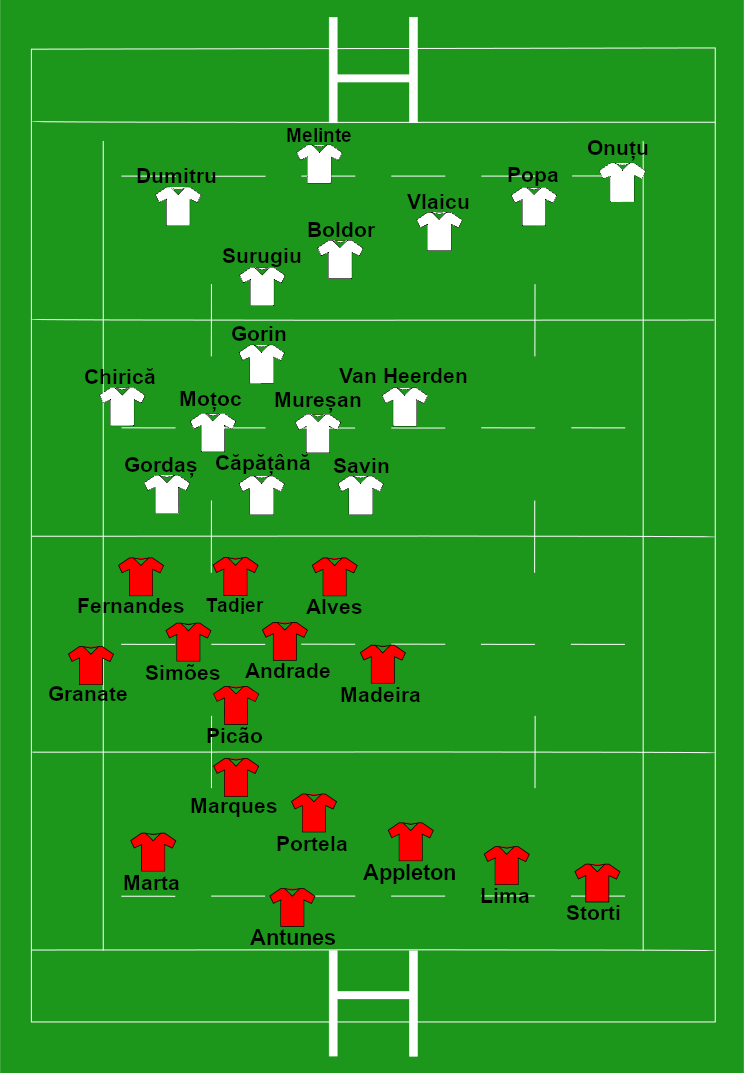

LP	1	Alexandru Savin	(substituted off) 59'
HK	2	Eugen Căpățână	(yellow card) 23' to 33' (substituted off) 54'
TP	3	Alex Gordaș	(substituted off) 40'
LL	4	Ionuț Mureșan	(substituted off) 68'
RL	5	Adrian Moțoc
BF	6	Johannes van Heerden
OF	7	Cristi Chirică	(substituted off) 23'
N8	8	André Gorin (c)
SH	9	Florin Surugiu	(substituted off) 68'
FH	10	Tudor Boldor	(substituted off) 68'
LW	11	Nicolas Onuțu
IC	12	Florin Vlaicu	(substituted off) 64'
OC	13	Vlăduț Popa
RW	14	Ionuț Dumitru	(substituted off) 23' (substituted on) 34'
FB	15	Ionel Melinte
Replacements:
HK	16	Ovidiu Cojocaru	(substituted on) 23' (substituted off) 33' (substituted on) 54'
PR	17	Constantin Pristăviță	(substituted on) 59'
PR	18	Costel Burțilă	(substituted on) 40'
LK	19	Marius Iftimiciuc	(substituted on) 68'
FL	20	Vlad Neculau	(substituted on) 23'
SH	21	Gabriel Rupanu	(substituted on) 68'
FH	22	Daniel Plai	(substituted on) 68'
CE	23	Paul Popoaia	(substituted on) 64'
Coach:
Andy Robinson

Touch judges:
Pierre-Baptiste Nuchy (France)
Richard Duhau (France)
Television match official:
Patrick Dellac (France)

14 March 2021
12:45 CET (UTC+01)

(1 LBP) Spain	19–25	Georgia
Try: Linklater 4'; Con: Güemes 4'; Pen: Güemes 40', 47'; Linklater 64', 69'	Report	Try: Jalaghonia 3'; Tabutsadze 48'; Bregvadze 67'; Con: Abzhandadze 3', 68'; Pen: Abzhandadze 14', 61'

Estadio Nacional Complutense, Madrid
Attendance: 0
Referee: Pierre Brousset (France)

LP	1	Fernando López (c)	(substituted off) 40'
HK	2	Marco Pinto Ferrer	(substituted off) 40'
TP	3	Jon Zabala	(substituted off) 42'
LL	4	Victor Sánchez	(substituted off) 9' (substituted on) 14'	(substituted off) 18' (substituted on) 32'
RL	5	Manuel Mora	(substituted off) 61'
BF	6	Kalokalo Gavidi
OF	7	Pierre Barthere	(substituted off) 58'
N8	8	Fréderic Quercy
SH	9	Tomás Munilla	(substituted off) 67'
FH	10	Bautista Güemes	(substituted off) 53'
LW	11	Jordi Jorba	(substituted off) 50'
IC	12	Álvar Gimeno
OC	13	Alejandro Alonso
RW	14	Brad Linklater
FB	15	Charly Malié
Replacements:
PR	16	Thierry Futeu	(substituted on) 40'
HK	17	Vicento del Hoyo	(substituted on) 40'
PR	18	Bittor Aboitiz	(substituted on) 42'
LK	19	Aníbal Bonan	(substituted on) 9' (substituted off) 14'	(substituted on) 18' (substituted off) 32'
FL	20	Brice Ferrer	(substituted on) 58'
SH	21	Kerman Aurrekoetxea	(substituted on) 67'
FH	22	Gonzalo Vinuesa	(substituted on) 53'
WG	23	Federico Casteglioni	(substituted on) 50'
Coach:
Santiago Santos

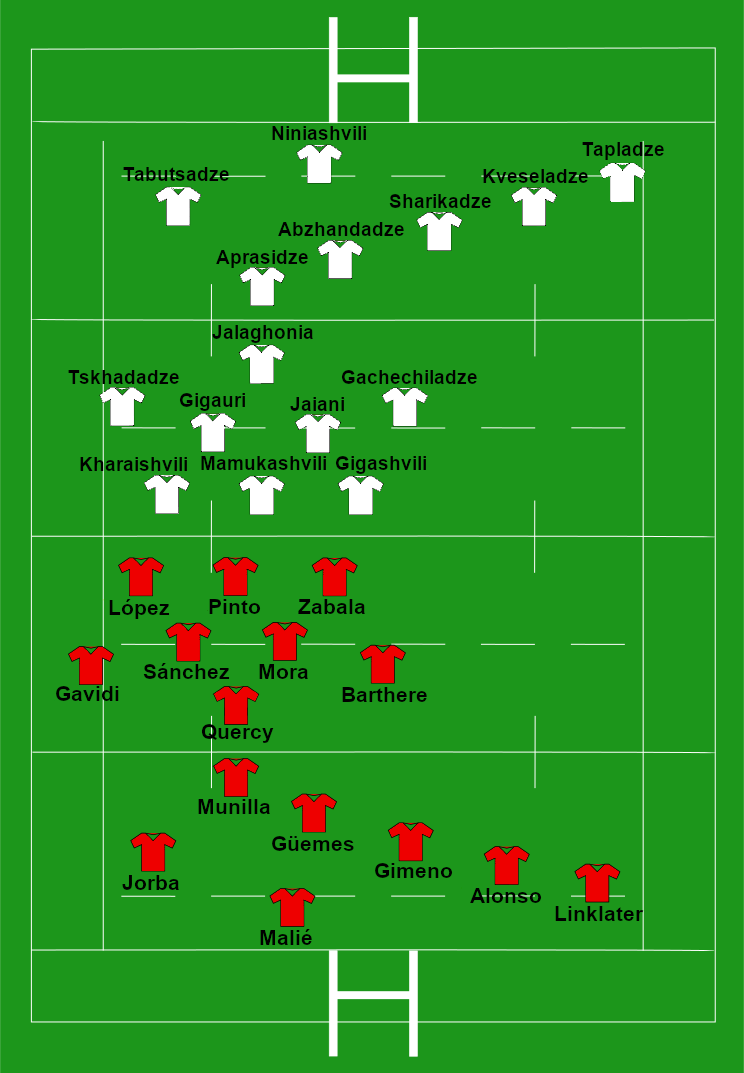

LP	1	Beka Gigashvili	(substituted off) 52'
HK	2	Shalva Mamukashvili	(substituted off) 40'
TP	3	Giorgi Kharaishvili	(substituted off) 52'
LL	4	Lasha Jaiani
RL	5	Davit Gigauri
BF	6	Mikheil Gachechiladze
OF	7	Irakli Tskhadadze	(substituted off) 58'
N8	8	Tornike Jalaghonia
SH	9	Gela Aprasidze	(substituted off) 66' (substituted on) 78'
FH	10	Tedo Abzhandadze
LW	11	Demur Tapladze
IC	12	Merab Sharikadze (c)
OC	13	Giorgi Kveseladze
RW	14	Aka Tabutsadze
FB	15	Davit Niniashvili
Replacements:
HK	16	Jaba Bregvadze	(substituted on) 40'
PR	17	Guram Gogichashvili	(substituted on) 52'
PR	18	Giorgi Melikidze	(substituted on) 52'
LK	19	Nodar Tcheishvili
FL	20	Giorgi Tkhilaishvili	(substituted on) 58'
SH	21	Mikheil Alania	(substituted on) 66' (substituted off) 78'
FH	22	Giorgi Babunashvili
WG	23	Alexander Todua
Coach:
Levan Maisashvili

Touch judges:
Sébastien Minery (France)
Jean-Claude Labarbe (France)
Television match official:
Philippe Bonhoure (France)

=== Week 3 ===
20 March 2021
13:00 KALT (UTC+02)

Russia	6–23	Georgia (1 TBP)
Pen: Gaisin 38', 48'	Report	Try: Tabutsadze 29'; Abzhandadze 39'; Niniashvili 60'; Con: Abzhandadze 61'; Pen: Abzhandadze 3', 21'

Kaliningrad Stadium, Kaliningrad
Attendance: 9,564
Referee: Andrea Piardi (Italy)

LP	1	Valery Morozov	(substituted off) 62'
HK	2	Stanislav Sel'skiy	(substituted off) 63'
TP	3	Vladimir Podrezov	(substituted off) 63'
LL	4	Andrei Ostrikov
RL	5	Bogdan Fedotko	(substituted off) 67'
BF	6	German Silenko
OF	7	Nikita Vavilin	(substituted off) 14' (substituted on) 28' (substituted off) 41'
N8	8	Victor Gresev (c)
SH	9	Konstantin Uzunov	(substituted off) 72'
FH	10	Ramil Gaisin
LW	11	Vasily Artemyev
IC	12	Kirill Golosnitsky	(substituted off) 50' (substituted on) 53' (substituted off) 70'
OC	13	German Davydov
RW	14	Andrei Karzanov
FB	15	Alexandr Budychenko	(substituted off) 66'
Replacements:
HK	16	Shamil Magomedov	(substituted on) 63'
PR	17	Evgeny Mishechkin	(substituted on) 63'
PR	18	Stepan Seryakov	(substituted on) 63'
LK	19	Alexander Ilin	(substituted on) 67'
FL	20	Anton Sychev	(substituted on) 14' (substituted off) 28' (substituted on) 41'
SH	21	Denis Barabantsev	(substituted on) 72'
FH	22	Yuri Kushnarev	(substituted on) 50' (substituted off) 53' (substituted on) 70'
FB	23	Khetag Dzobelov	(substituted on) 66'
Coach:
Lyn Jones

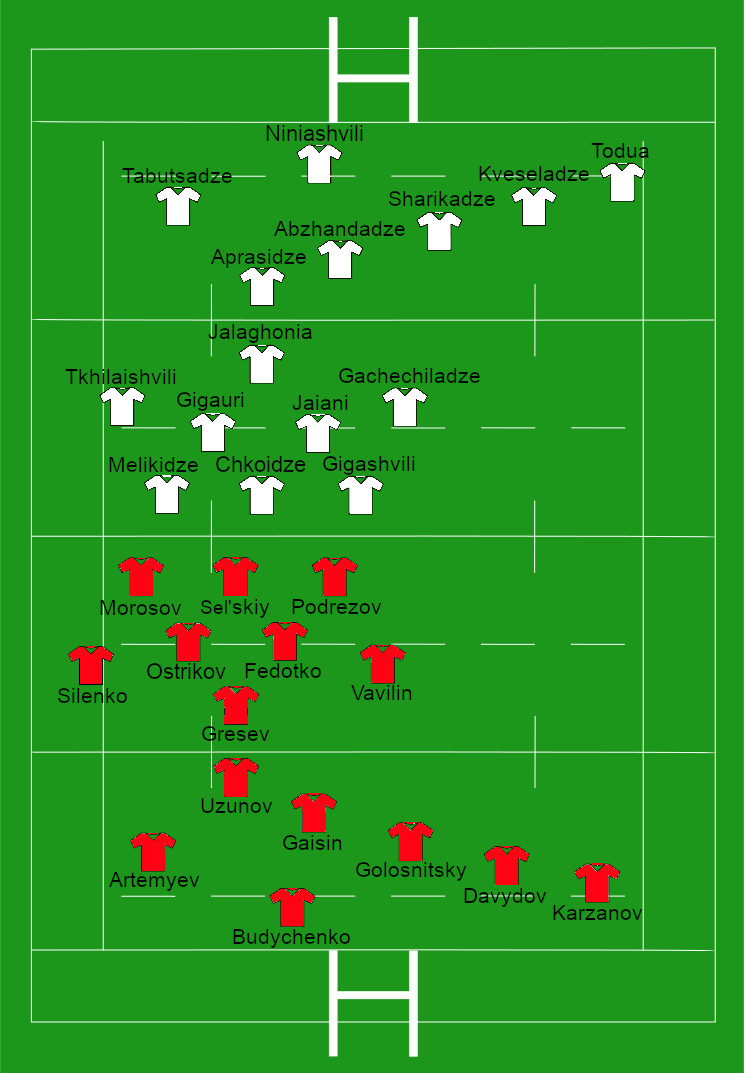

LP	1	Beka Gigashvili	(substituted off) 50'
HK	2	Giorgi Chkoidze	(substituted off) 50'
TP	3	Giorgi Melikidze	(substituted off) 50'
LL	4	Lasha Jaiani	(substituted off) 63'
RL	5	Davit Gigauri
BF	6	Mikheil Gachechiladze
OF	7	Giorgi Tkhilaishvili	(substituted off) 75'
N8	8	Tornike Jalaghonia
SH	9	Gela Aprasidze	(substituted off) 77'
FH	10	Tedo Abzhandadze	(substituted off) 68'
LW	11	Alexander Todua
IC	12	Merab Sharikadze (c)
OC	13	Giorgi Kveseladze
RW	14	Aka Tabutsadze
FB	15	Davit Niniashvili	(substituted off) 70'
Replacements:
HK	16	Jaba Bregvadze	(substituted on) 50'
PR	17	Guram Gogichashvili	(substituted on) 50'
PR	18	Giorgi Kharaishvili	(substituted on) 50'
LK	19	Nodar Tcheishvili	(substituted on) 63'
FL	20	Irakli Tskhadadze	(substituted on) 75'
SH	21	Mikheil Alania	(substituted on) 77'
FH	22	Giorgi Babunashvili	(substituted on) 68'
FB	23	Soso Matiashvili	(substituted on) 70'
Coach:
Levan Maisahvili

Touch judges:
Manuel Bottino (Italy)
Matteo Franco (Italy)
Television match official:
Matteo Liperini (Italy)

20 March 2021
15:00 EET (UTC+02)

Romania	22–16	Spain (1 LBP)
Try: Căpățână 60'; Melinte 79'; Pen: Vlaicu 25', 40', 47', 52'	Report	Try: Rouet 42'; Con: Ordas 43'; Pen: Ordas 8', 34', 77'

Stadionul Steaua II, Bucharest
Attendance: 50
Referee: Nika Amashukeli (Georgia)

LP	1	Alexandru Savin	(substituted off) 73'
HK	2	Eugen Căpățână	(substituted off) 73'
TP	3	Alexandru Țăruș
LL	4	Marius Antonescu	(substituted off) 80'
RL	5	Adrian Moțoc
BF	6	Johannes van Heerden	(substituted off) 77'
OF	7	Vlad Neculau
N8	8	André Gorin (c)
SH	9	Florin Surugiu
FH	10	Daniel Plai
LW	11	Nicolas Onuțu
IC	12	Florin Vlaicu
OC	13	Vlăduț Popa	(substituted off) 40'
RW	14	Ionuț Dumitru	(substituted off) 70'
FB	15	Ionel Melinte
Replacements:
HK	16	Ovidiu Cojocaru	(substituted on) 73'
PR	17	Constantin Pristăviță	(substituted on) 73'
PR	18	Alex Gordaș
LK	19	Marius Iftimiciuc	(substituted on) 80'
FL	20	Cristi Boboc	(substituted on) 77'
SH	21	Gabriel Rupanu
CE	22	Tudor Boldor	(substituted on) 40'
WG	23	Paul Popoaia	(substituted on) 70'
Coach:
Andy Robinson

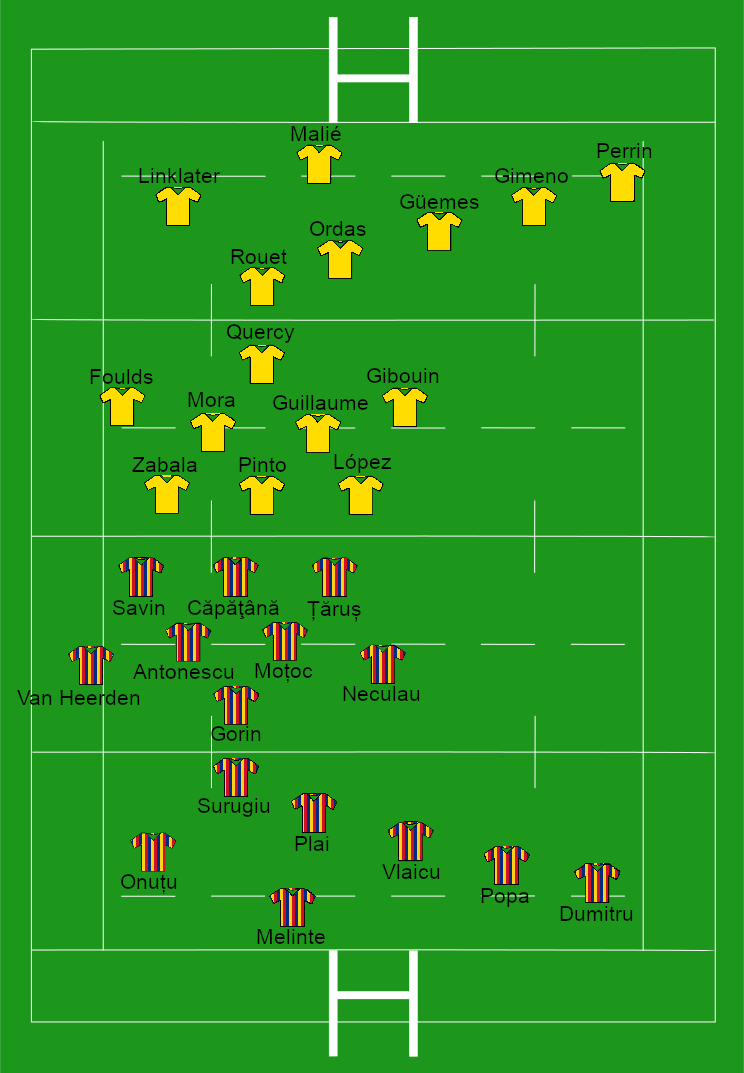

LP	1	Fernando López (c)	(substituted off) 63'
HK	2	Marco Pinto Ferrer	(substituted off) 64'
TP	3	Jon Zabala	(substituted off) 70'
LL	4	Lucas Guillaume
RL	5	Manuel Mora	(yellow card) 49' to 59' (substituted off) 72'
BF	6	Gauthier Gibouin
OF	7	Matthew Foulds	(substituted off) 77'
N8	8	Fréderic Quercy	(red card) 58'
SH	9	Guillaume Rouet	(yellow card) 66' to 76'
FH	10	Manuel Ordas
LW	11	Fabien Perrin
IC	12	Bautista Güemes	(substituted off) 54'
OC	13	Álvar Gimeno
RW	14	Brad Linklater	(substituted off) 78'
FB	15	Charly Malié	(yellow card) 70' to 80'
Replacements:
PR	16	Thierry Futeu	(substituted on) 63'
HK	17	Vicento del Hoyo	(substituted on) 64'
PR	18	Bittor Aboitiz	(substituted on) 70'
LK	19	Josh Peters	(substituted on) 72'
FL	20	Brice Ferrer	(substituted on) 77'
SH	21	Tomás Munilla
CE	22	Richard Stewart	(substituted on) 54'
WG	23	Jordi Jorba	(substituted on) 78'
Coach:
Santiago Santos

Touch judges:
Papuna Chiqaberidze (Georgia)
Giga Mshvenieradze (Georgia)
Television match official:
Sulkhan Chikhladze (Georgia)

=== Week 4 ===
27 March 2021
16:00 WET (UTC+00)

Portugal	43–28	Spain
Try: Simões 28'; Portela 39'; Marta 47'; Storti 59'; Marques 77'; Fernandes 80'; Con: Marques 29', 40', 48', 59', 79; Pen: Marques 71'	Report	Try: Pinto Ferrer 6'; Rouet 16'; Linklater 36'; Ordas 80'; Con: Ordas 7', 17', 37', 80'

Estádio de Rugby Jamor, Lisbon
Attendance: 0
Referee: Ludovic Cayre (France)

LP	1	Geoffrey Moïse	(substituted off) 45'
HK	2	Mike Tadjer
TP	3	Anthony Alves	(substituted off) 68'
LL	4	José Madeira	(yellow card) 17' to 27'
RL	5	Eric dos Santos
BF	6	João Granate	(substituted off) 19'
OF	7	Manuel Picão
N8	8	Rafael Simões	(substituted off) 57'
SH	9	Samuel Marques	(yellow card) 8' to 18'
FH	10	Jerónimo Portela	(substituted off) 79'
LW	11	Rodrigo Marta
IC	12	Tomás Appleton (c)
OC	13	José Lima	(substituted off) 68'
RW	14	Raffaele Storti
FB	15	Nuno Sousa Guedes
Replacements:
PR	16	Francisco Fernandes	(substituted on) 45'
HK	17	Loïc Bournonville	(substituted on) 71'
PR	18	Diogo Hasse Ferreira	(substituted on) 68'
FL	19	Duarte Torgal	(substituted on) 19'
N8	20	Francisco Sousa	(substituted on) 57'
SH	21	Théo Entraygues
FH	22	Jorge Abecasis	(substituted on) 79'
CE	23	Dany Antunes	(substituted on) 68'
Coach:
Patrice Lagisquet

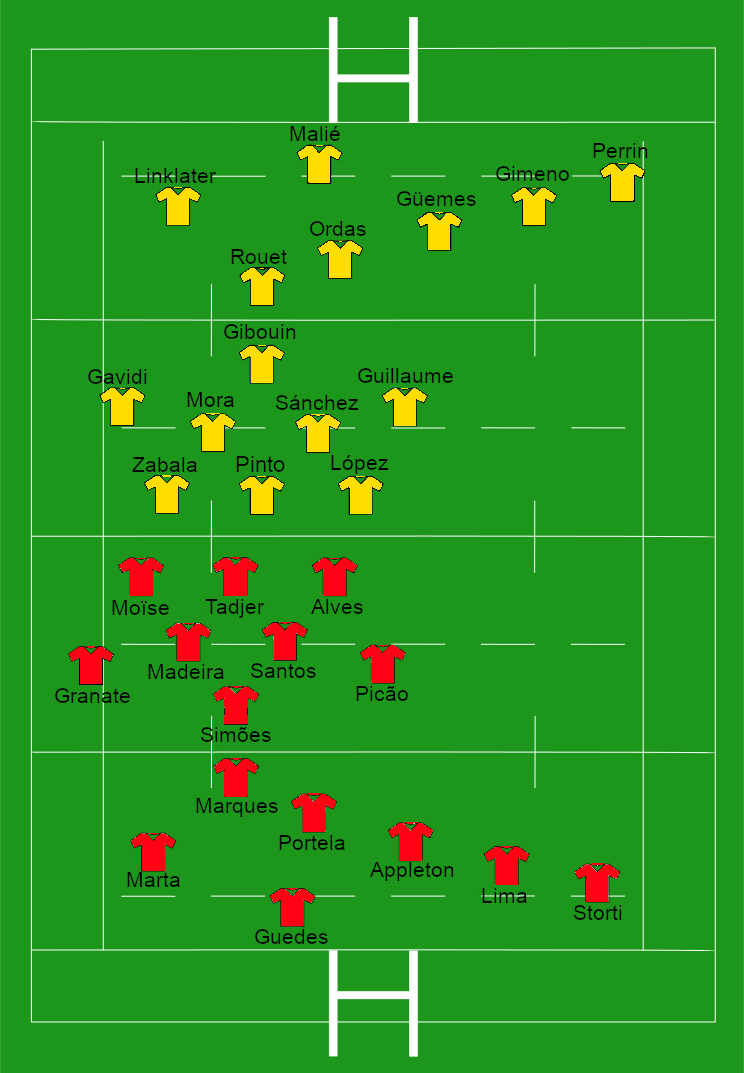

LP	1	Fernando López (c)	(substituted off) 45'
HK	2	Marco Pinto Ferrer	(substituted off) 54'
TP	3	Jon Zabala	(substituted off) 51'
LL	4	Victor Sánchez
RL	5	Manuel Mora	(substituted off) 51'
BF	6	Lucas Guillaume
OF	7	Kalokalo Gavidi	(substituted off) 64'
N8	8	Gautier Gibouin
SH	9	Guillaume Rouet	(substituted off) 68'
FH	10	Manuel Ordas
LW	11	Fabien Perrin	(red card) 49'
IC	12	Bautista Güemes	(substituted off) 56'
OC	13	Álvar Gimeno
RW	14	Brad Linklater
FB	15	Charly Malié	(yellow card) 61' to 71' (substituted off) 71'
Replacements:
PR	16	Thierry Futeu	(substituted on) 45' (yellow card) 45' to 55'
HK	17	Vicente del Hoyo	(substituted on) 54'
PR	18	Bittor Aboitiz	(substituted on) 51'
LK	19	Aníbal Bonan	(substituted on) 51'
FL	20	Matthew Foulds	(substituted on) 64'
SH	21	Tomás Munilla	(substituted on) 68'
CE	22	Richard Stewart	(substituted on) 56'
FB	23	Jordi Jorba	(substituted on) 71'
Coach:
Santiago Santos

Touch judges:
Cedric Marchat (France)
Stéphane Crapoix (France)
Television match official:
Denis Grenouillet (France)

28 March 2021
15:00 GET (UTC+04)

Georgia	28–17	Romania
Try: Penalty try 10'; Gigashvili 51'; Tabutsadze 70'; Con: Abzhandadze 52'; Pen: Abzhandadze 20', 40'; Drop: Babunashvili 80'	Report	Try: Gorin 21'; Căpățână 61'; Con: Plai 22'; Vlaicu 62'; Pen: Vlaicu 44'

Mikheil Meskhi Stadium, Tbilisi
Attendance: 8,000
Referee: Paulo Duarte (Portugal)

LP	1	Beka Gigashvili
HK	2	Shalva Mamukashvili	(red card) 18'
TP	3	Giorgi Melikidze	(substituted off) 56'
LL	4	Lasha Jaiani
RL	5	Davit Gigauri	(substituted off) 64'
BF	6	Mikheil Gachechiladze	(substituted off) 24'
OF	7	Beka Saghinadze
N8	8	Tornike Jalaghonia
SH	9	Gela Aprasidze
FH	10	Tedo Abzhandadze	(substituted off) 65'
LW	11	Alexander Todua
IC	12	Merab Sharikadze (c)
OC	13	Giorgi Kveseladze
RW	14	Aka Tabutsadze
FB	15	Lasha Khmaladze
Replacements:
HK	16	Giorgi Chkoidze	(substituted on) 24'
PR	17	Nika Abuladze
PR	18	Giorgi Kharaishvili	(substituted on) 56'
LK	19	Nodar Tcheishvili	(substituted on) 64'
FL	20	Giorgi Tkhilaishvili
SH	21	Mikheil Alania
FH	22	Giorgi Babunashvili	(substituted on) 65'
FB	23	Soso Matiashvili
Coach:
Levan Maisahvili

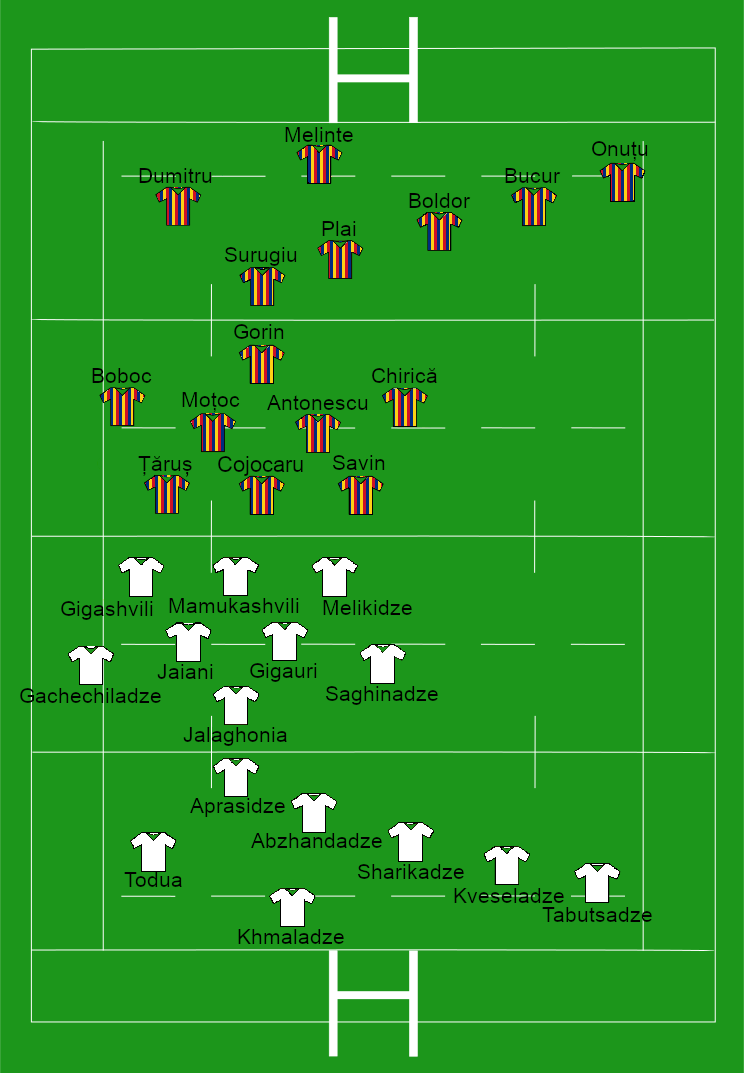

LP	1	Alexandru Savin	(yellow card) 6' to 16' (substituted off) 30'
HK	2	Ovidiu Cojocaru	(substituted off) 54'
TP	3	Alexandru Țăruș	(substituted off) 63'
LL	4	Marius Antonescu	(substituted off) 72'
RL	5	Adrian Moțoc
BF	6	Cristi Chirică	(substituted off) 56'
OF	7	Cristi Boboc
N8	8	André Gorin (c)
SH	9	Florin Surugiu	(substituted off) 64'
FH	10	Daniel Plai
LW	11	Nicolas Onuțu	(substituted off) 35'
IC	12	Tudor Boldor
OC	13	Alexandru Bucur
RW	14	Ionuț Dumitru
FB	15	Ionel Melinte	(substituted off) 32'
Replacements:
HK	16	Eugen Căpățână	(substituted on) 54'
PR	17	Constantin Pristăviță	(substituted on) 30'
PR	18	Costel Burțilă	(substituted on) 63'
LK	19	Marius Iftimiciuc	(substituted on) 72'
FL	20	Johannes van Heerden	(substituted on) 56'
SH	21	Gabriel Rupanu	(substituted on) 64'
FB	22	Florin Vlaicu	(substituted on) 35'
WG	23	Paul Popoaia	(substituted on) 32'
Coach:
Andy Robinson

Touch judges:
Francisco Serra (Portugal)
José Moita (Portugal)
Television match official:
Pedro Mendes Silva (Portugal)

=== Week 5 ===
26 June 2021
17:00 GET (UTC+04)

(1 TBP) Georgia	48–15	Netherlands
Try: Niniashvili 10', 72', 79'; Tabutsadze 25', 65'; Lobzhanidze 37'; Gogichashvili 54'; Javakhia 60'; Con: Abzhandadze 55'; Babunashvili 61', 66', 73'	Report	Try: Hop 35' v. Dijk 75'; Con: Wierenga 76'; Pen: Rademaker 16'

Caucasus Arena, Telavi
Attendance: 700
Referee: Alexandru Ionescu (Romania)

LP	1	Nika Khatiashvili	(substituted off) 40'
HK	2	Jaba Bregvadze	(substituted off) 40'
TP	3	Giorgi Melikidze	(substituted off) 40'
LL	4	Nodar Tcheishvili
RL	5	Konstantin Mikautadze	(substituted off) 58'
BF	6	Mikheil Gachechiladze
OF	7	Beka Saghinadze	(substituted off) 69'
N8	8	Ilia Spanderashvili	(yellow card) 34' to 44'
SH	9	Vasil Lobzhanidze	(substituted off) 63'
FH	10	Tedo Abzhandadze	(substituted off) 56'
LW	11	Mirian Modebadze
IC	12	Merab Sharikadze (c)
OC	13	Giorgi Kveseladze	(substituted off) 63'
RW	14	Aka Tabutsadze
FB	15	Davit Niniashvili
Replacements:
HK	16	Shalva Mamukashvili	(substituted on) 40'
PR	17	Guram Gogichashvili	(substituted on) 40'
PR	18	Giorgi Kharaishvili	(substituted on) 40'
LK	19	Giorgi Javakhia	(substituted on) 58'
FL	20	Irakli Tskhadadze	(substituted on) 69'
SH	21	Mikheil Alania	(substituted on) 63'
CE	22	Demur Tapladze	(substituted on) 63'
FH	23	Giorgi Babunashvili	(substituted on) 56'
Coach:
Levan Maisahvili

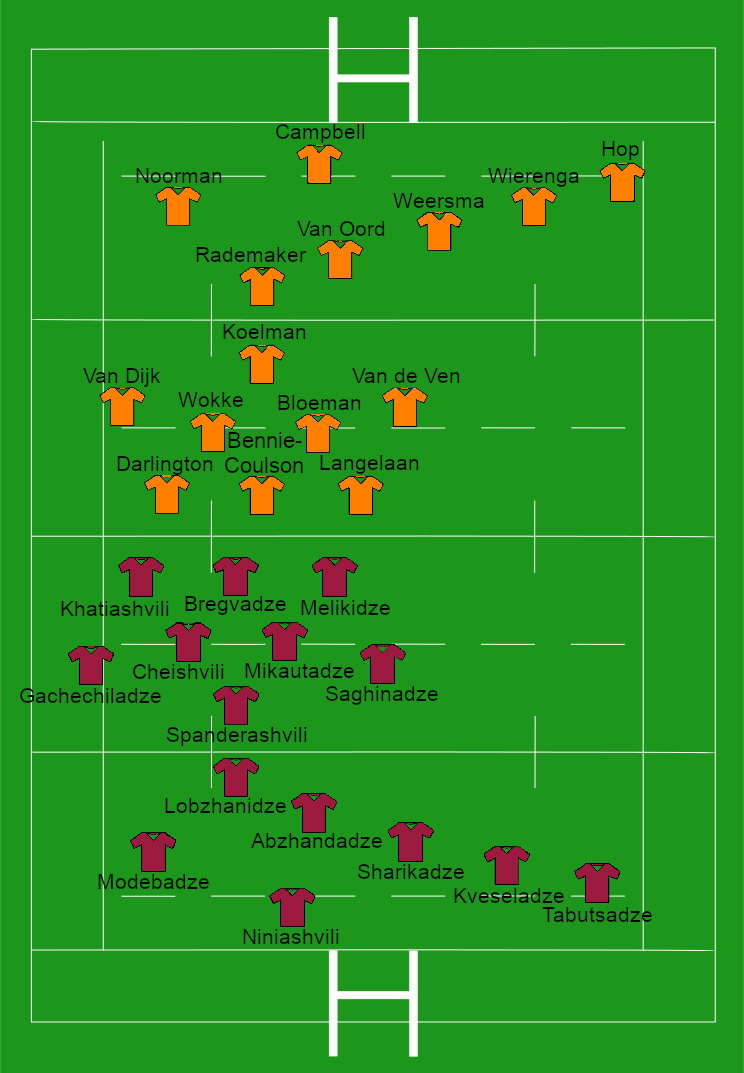

LP	1	Hugo Langelaan	(substituted off) 40'
HK	2	Ross Bennie-Coulson	(substituted off) 73'
TP	3	Andrew Darlington	(substituted off) 73'
LL	4	Koen Bloemen	(substituted off) 60'
RL	5	Mark Wokke	(substituted off) 73'
BF	6	Niels van de Ven	(substituted off) 67'
OF	7	Wolf van Dijk	(yellow card) 63' to 73'
N8	8	Dave Koelman
SH	9	Amir Rademaker	(substituted off) 60'
FH	10	Mees van Oord
LW	11	Jordy Hop
IC	12	David Weersma	(yellow card) 4' to 14'
OC	13	Bart Wierenga (c)
RW	14	Siem Noorman	(substituted off) 9'
FB	15	Te Campbell
Replacements:
HK	16	Michael Mbaud	(substituted on) 73'
PR	17	Lodi Buijs	(substituted on) 40'
PR	18	Delano van der Sligte	(substituted on) 73'
LK	19	Marijn Huis	(substituted on) 60'
FL	20	Jim Boelrijk	(substituted on) 73'
SH	21	Hugo Schöller	(substituted on) 60'
WG	22	Daily Limmen	(substituted on) 9'
FL	23	Blake Nightingale	(substituted on) 67'
Coach:
Zane Gardiner

Touch judges:
Mihai Văcaru (Romania)
Vlad Iordăchescu (Romania)
Television match official:
Cristian Răduță (Romania)

=== Week 6 ===
10 July 2021
15:00 CEST (UTC+02)

Netherlands	28–61	Portugal (1 TBP)
Try: Wierenga 37'; Campbell 54', 84'; Hop 65'; Con: Weersma 38', 54', 66', 85'	Report	Try: Tadjer 2'; Storti 12', 14', 60', 75', 80'; Marta 37', 50', 67'; Con: Marques 9', 13', 15', 40', 51', 61', 68', 76'

NRCA Stadium, Amsterdam
Attendance: 1,600
Referee: Aled Evans (Wales)

LP	1	Hugo Langelaan	(substituted off) 73'
HK	2	Ross Bennie-Coulson	(substituted off) 73'
TP	3	Andrew Darlington	(substituted off) 40'
LL	4	Koen Bloemen
RL	5	Christopher van Leeuwen	(substituted off) 62'
BF	6	Dirk Danen (c)	(substituted off) 49'
OF	7	Niels van de Ven
N8	8	Dave Koelman	(substituted off) 17'
SH	9	Amir Rademaker	(substituted off) 62'
FH	10	Mees van Oord
LW	11	Jordy Hop
IC	12	David Weersma
OC	13	Daily Limmen	(substituted off) 73'
RW	14	Bart Wierenga
FB	15	Te Campbell
Replacements:
HK	16	Michael Mbaud	(substituted on) 73'
PR	17	Robin Moenen	(substituted on) 40'
PR	18	Lodi Buijs	(substituted on) 73'
LK	19	Mark Wokke	(substituted on) 62'
N8	20	Marijn Huis	(substituted on) 17'
FL	21	Blake Nightingale	(substituted on) 49'
SH	22	Hugo Schöller	(substituted on) 62'
CE	23	Robbin Schut	(substituted on) 73'
Coach:
Zane Gardiner

LP	1	Francisco Fernandes	(substituted off) 62'
HK	2	Mike Tadjer	(substituted off) 71'
TP	3	Anthony Alves	(substituted off) 55'
LL	4	José Madeira
RL	5	Jean Sousa	(substituted off) 71'
BF	6	João Granate
OF	7	Rafael Simões
N8	8	Thibault de Freitas	(substituted off) 66'
SH	9	Samuel Marques	(substituted off) 78'
FH	10	Jerónimo Portela
LW	11	Rodrigo Marta
IC	12	Tomás Appleton (c)
OC	13	José Lima	(substituted off) 66'
RW	14	Raffaele Storti
FB	15	Nuno Sousa Guedes	(substituted off) 69'
Replacements:
PR	16	David Costa	(substituted on) 62'
HK	17	Duarte Diniz	(substituted on) 71'
PR	18	Diogo Hasse Ferreira	(substituted on) 55'
LK	19	José Rebelo de Andrade	(substituted on) 71'
N8	20	Manuel Picão	(substituted on) 66'
SH	21	Pedro Lucas	(substituted on) 78'
FB	22	Manuel Cardoso Pinto	(substituted on) 69'
CE	23	Pedro Bettencourt	(substituted on) 66'
Coach:
Patrice Lagisquet

Touch judges:
Gareth Newman (Wales)
Dewi Phillips (Wales)
Television match official:
Sean Brickell (Wales)

=== Week 7 ===
17 July 2021
13:30 MSK (UTC+03)

Russia	26–49	Portugal
Try: Gresev 29'; Silenko 38', 59'; Sychev 77'; Con: Kushnarev 30', 39', 77	Report	Try: Appleton 7'; Granate 15'; Lima 45'; Simões 56'; Penalty try 61'; Portela 67'; Con: Marques 8', 16', 46', 68'; Pen: Marques 3', 32', 50'

Nizhny Novgorod Stadium, Nizhny Novgorod
Attendance: 5,500
Referee: Ben Blain (Scotland)

LP	1	Valery Morozov	(substituted off) 66'
HK	2	Shamil Magomedov	(substituted off) 14'
TP	3	Vladimir Podrezov	(substituted off) 63'
LL	4	Evgeny Elgin	(substituted off) 65'
RL	5	German Silenko	(substituted off) 60'
BF	6	Nikita Bekov
OF	7	Nikita Vavilin	(yellow card) 12' to 22'
N8	8	Victor Gresev (c)
SH	9	Konstantin Uzunov	(substituted off) 78'
FH	10	Ramil Gaisin	(substituted off) 12'
LW	11	Andrei Karzanov
IC	12	Dmitry Gerasimov
OC	13	Denis Simplikevich	(substituted off) 54'
RW	14	German Davydov
FB	15	Nikita Churashov	(yellow card) 61' to 71'
Replacements:
HK	16	Shamil Davudov	(substituted on) 14'
PR	17	Evgeny Mishechkin	(substituted on) 66'
PR	18	Magomed Davudov	(substituted on) 63'
LK	19	Vadim Zharkov	(substituted on) 60'
FL	20	Anton Sychev	(substituted on) 65'
SH	21	Stepan Khokhlov	(substituted on) 78'
FH	22	Yuri Kushnarev	(substituted on) 12'
CE	23	Luc Brocas	(substituted on) 54'
Coach:
Lyn Jones

LP	1	Francisco Fernandes	(substituted off) 50'
HK	2	Mike Tadjer	(substituted off) 68' (substituted on) 78'
TP	3	Anthony Alves	(substituted off) 50'
LL	4	José Madeira	(yellow card) 26' to 36'
RL	5	Jean Sousa
BF	6	João Granate	(substituted off) 68'
OF	7	Rafael Simões	(substituted off) 63'
N8	8	Thibault de Freitas	(substituted off) 78'
SH	9	Samuel Marques
FH	10	Jerónimo Portela
LW	11	Rodrigo Marta
IC	12	Tomás Appleton (c)
OC	13	José Lima	(substituted off) 73'
RW	14	Raffaele Storti
FB	15	Nuno Sousa Guedes	(substituted off) 65'
Replacements:
PR	16	David Costa	(substituted on) 50'
HK	17	Duarte Diniz	(substituted on) 68'
PR	18	Diogo Hasse Ferreira	(substituted on) 50' (yellow card) 73' to 83'
FL	19	José Rebelo de Andrade	(substituted on) 68'
FL	20	Manuel Picão	(substituted on) 63'
SH	21	Pedro Lucas
FB	22	Manuel Cardoso Pinto	(substituted on) 65'
CE	23	Pedro Bettencourt	(substituted on) 73'
Coach:
Patrice Lagisquet

Touch judges:
Alexandru Ionescu (Romania)
Radu Petrescu (Romania)
Television match official:
Charles Samson (Scotland)

=== Week 8 ===
6 November 2021
15:00 CET (UTC+01)

Netherlands	8–35	Russia (1 TBP)
Try: van der Avoird 58'; Pen: Weersma 42'	Report	Try: Zhivatov 8'; Brocas 28'; Karzanov 43'; Morozov 51'; Ivanov 54'; Con: Gaisin 9', 29', 44', 52', 55'

NRCA Stadium, Amsterdam
Attendance: 2,000
Referee: Keith Allen (Scotland)

LP	1	Hugo Langelaan	(substituted off) 70'
HK	2	Mark Darlington	(substituted off) 52'
TP	3	Andrew Darlington	(substituted off) 56'
LL	4	Christopher van Leeuwen
RL	5	Jim Boelrijk	(substituted off) 52'
BF	6	Dirk Danen (c)	(substituted off) 63'
OF	7	Wolf van Dijk
N8	8	Niels van de Ven	(substituted off) 70'
SH	9	Amir Rademaker	(substituted off) 56'
FH	10	David Weersma	(substituted off) 52'
LW	11	Daan van der Avoird
IC	12	Oliva Sialau
OC	13	Bart Wierenga
RW	14	Jordy Hop
FB	15	Te Campbell
Replacements:
HK	16	Ross Bennie-Coulson	(substituted on) 52'
PR	17	Robin Moenen	(substituted on) 70'
PR	18	Lodi Buijs	(substituted on) 56'
LK	19	Rikkert Verhofstad	(substituted on) 70'
FL	20	Blake Nightingale	(substituted on) 52'
FL	21	Christopher Raymond	(substituted on) 63'
SH	22	Hugo Schöller	(substituted on) 56'
FH	23	Mees van Oord	(substituted on) 52'
Coach:
Zane Gardiner

LP	1	Valery Morozov	(substituted off) 68'
HK	2	Alexander Ivanov	(substituted off) 70'
TP	3	Kirill Gotovtsev	(substituted off) 65'
LL	4	Igor Zykov	(substituted off) 68'
RL	5	German Silenko
BF	6	Vitaly Zhivatov (c)
OF	7	Artémy Gallo	(substituted off) 70'
N8	8	Nikita Vavilin
SH	9	Konstantin Uzunov	(substituted off) 72'
FH	10	Ramil Gaisin	(substituted off) 72'
LW	11	Andrei Karzanov
IC	12	Kirill Golosnitsky
OC	13	Luc Brocas
RW	14	Daniil Potikhanov	(yellow card) 65' to 75' (substituted off) 75'
FB	15	German Davydov
Replacements:
HK	16	Alishan Umarov	(substituted on) 70'
PR	17	Evgeny Mishechkin	(substituted on) 68'
PR	18	Vladimir Podrezov	(substituted on) 65'
LK	19	Alexander Ilin	(substituted on) 68'
FL	20	Anton Sychev	(substituted on) 70'
SH	21	Stepan Khokhlov	(substituted on) 72'
FH	22	Yuri Kushnarev	(substituted on) 72'
WG	23	Victor Kononov	(substituted on) 75'
Coach:
Lyn Jones

Touch judges:
David Sutherland (Scotland)
Graeme Ormiston (Scotland)
Television match official:
Neil Paterson (Scotland)

=== Week 9 ===
13 November 2021
17:30 EET (UTC+02)

(1 TBP) Romania	56–15	Netherlands
Try: Simionescu 10'; Dumitru 19', 48', 56'; Cojocaru 29', 43'; Vaovasa 31'; Bărdașu 80'; Con: Melinte 11', 20', 30', 32', 44', 49', 57', 80'	Report	Try: Bloemen 25' van de Avoird 71'; Con: van Oord 26'; Pen: van Oord 35'

Arcul de Triumf Stadium, Bucharest
Attendance: 0
Referee: Peter Martin (Ireland)

LP	1	Constantin Pristăviță	(substituted off) 60'
HK	2	Ovidiu Cojocaru	(substituted off) 60'
TP	3	Vasile Bălan	(substituted off) 60'
LL	4	Marius Antonescu	(substituted off) 73'
RL	5	Adrian Moțoc
BF	6	Cristi Chirică
OF	7	Mihai Macovei (c)	29' to 32'
N8	8	André Gorin	(substituted off) 65'
SH	9	Gabriel Rupanu	(substituted off) 49'
FH	10	Daniel Plai
LW	11	Marius Simionescu
IC	12	Jason Tomane
OC	13	Hinckley Vaovasa	(substituted off) 57'
RW	14	Ionuț Dumitru	(substituted off) 65'
FB	15	Ionel Melinte
Replacements:
HK	16	Florin Bărdașu	(substituted on) 60'
PR	17	Alexandru Savin	(substituted on) 60'
PR	18	Costel Burțilă	(substituted on) 60'
LK	19	Marius Iftimiciuc	(substituted on) 73'
N8	20	Florian Roșu	(substituted on) 29' (substituted off) 32' (substituted on) 65'
SH	21	Florin Surugiu	(substituted on) 49'
CE	22	Taylor Gontineac	(substituted on) 57'
WG	23	Paul Popoaia	(substituted on) 65'
Coach:
Andy Robinson

LP	1	Hugo Langelaan	(substituted off) 73'
HK	2	Ross Bennie-Coulson	(substituted off) 57'
TP	3	Andrew Darlington	(substituted off) 60'
LL	4	Koen Bloemen
RL	5	Louis Bruinsma	(substituted off) 52'
BF	6	Wolf van Dijk
OF	7	Blake Nightingale	(substituted off) 52'
N8	8	Dirk Danen (c)	(substituted off) 58'
SH	9	Hugo Schöller	(substituted off) 57'
FH	10	Mees van Oord	(substituted off) 57'
LW	11	Daan van der Avoird
IC	12	Oliva Sialau
OC	13	Bart Wierenga
RW	14	Jordy Hop
FB	15	Te Campbell
Replacements:
HK	16	Ross Bennie-Coulson	(substituted on) 57'
PR	17	Robin Moenen	(substituted on) 73'
PR	18	Lodi Buijs	(substituted on) 60'
LK	19	Marijn Huis	(substituted on) 52'
FL	20	Niels van de Ven	(substituted on) 52'
N8	21	Christopher Raymond	(substituted on) 58'
SH	22	Amir Rademaker	(substituted on) 57'
FH	23	Storm Carroll	(substituted on) 57'
Coach:
Zane Gardiner

Touch judges:
Nigel Correll (Ireland)
Stuart Douglas (Ireland)
Television match official:
Leo Colgan (Ireland)

14 November 2021
12:45 CET (UTC+01)

(1 TBP) Spain	49–12	Russia
Try: Pinto Ferrer 7'; Gimeno 23'; Mora 35', 44'; Perrin 62'; Losada 67'; Aboitiz 73'; Con: Güemes 7', 23', 36', 45'; Ordas 63', 68', 73'	Report	Try: Uzonov 47'; Kononov 65'; Con: Golov 65'

Estadio Nacional Complutense, Madrid
Attendance: 5,000
Referee: Ben Breakspear (Wales)

LP	1	Fernando López (c)	(substituted off) 50'
HK	2	Marco Pinto Ferrer	(substituted off) 64'
TP	3	Jon Zabala	(substituted off) 66'
LL	4	Manuel Mora	(substituted off) 66' (substituted on) 80'
RL	5	Lucas Guillaume
BF	6	Gautier Gibouin
OF	7	Matthew Foulds
N8	8	Afaese Tauli	(substituted off) 43'
SH	9	Guillaume Rouet	(substituted off) 64'
FH	10	Bautista Güemes	(substituted off) 47'
LW	11	Gauthier Minguillon	(substituted off) 68'
IC	12	Álvar Gimeno	(yellow card) 41' to 51'
OC	13	Fabien Perrin
RW	14	Joan Losada
FB	15	J. W. Bell
Replacements:
PR	16	Thierry Futeu	(substituted on) 50'
HK	17	Santiago Ovejero	(substituted on) 64'
PR	18	Bittor Aboitiz	(substituted on) 66'
LK	19	Victor Sánchez	(substituted on) 66'
N8	20	Facundo Domínguez	(substituted on) 43' (substituted off) 80'
SH	21	Tomás Munilla	(substituted on) 64'
FH	22	Manuel Ordas	(substituted on) 47'
WG	23	Jordi Jorba	(substituted on) 68'
Coach:
Santiago Santos

LP	1	Valery Morozov	(red card) 10'
HK	2	Alexander Ivanov	(substituted off) 41' (substituted on) 73'
TP	3	Kirill Gotovtsev	(substituted off) 55'
LL	4	Igor Zykov	(substituted off) 55'
RL	5	German Silenko
BF	6	Vitaly Zhivatov (c)	(substituted off) 16'
OF	7	Artémy Gallo	(yellow card) 34' to 44'
N8	8	Nikita Vavilin	(substituted off) 58'
SH	9	Konstantin Uzunov	(substituted off) 65'
FH	10	Ramil Gaisin	(substituted off) 68'
LW	11	Andrei Karzanov
IC	12	Kirill Golosnitsky	(substituted off) 63'
OC	13	Luc Brocas
RW	14	Daniil Potikhanov
FB	15	German Davydov
Replacements:
HK	16	Dmitry Parkhomenko	(substituted on) 41' (substituted off) 73'
PR	17	Evgeny Mishechkin	(substituted on) 16'
PR	18	Vladimir Podrezov	(substituted on) 55'
LK	19	Alexander Ilin	(substituted on) 55'
N8	20	Anton Sychev	(substituted on) 58'
SH	21	Stepan Khokhlov	(substituted on) 65'
FH	22	Alexei Golov	(substituted on) 68'
CE	23	Victor Kononov	(substituted on) 63'
Coach:
Lyn Jones

Touch judges:
Jason Bessant (Wales)
Tom Spurrier (Wales)
Television match official:
Wayne Davies (Wales)

=== Week 10 ===
18 December 2021
14:00 CET (UTC+01)

Netherlands	7–52	Spain (1 TBP)
	Report

NRCA Stadium, Amsterdam
Attendance: 0
Referee: Eoghan Cross (Ireland)

Touch judges:
Andrew Cole (Ireland)
Jonny Erskine (Ireland)
Television match official:
Colin Stanley (Ireland)

== International broadcasters ==
Country	Broadcaster	Summary
Georgia	Rugby TV; Imedi TV	All games exclusively live and free on Rugby TV and Imedi TV
Netherlands	Ziggo	All games exclusively live and free on Ziggo
Portugal	RTP2; Rugby TV Portugal	Home games live and free on RTP2 and Rugby TV Portugal
Romania	TVR	All games exclusively live and free on TVR 1
Russia	Match TV; Sportrecs.com	All games exclusively broadcast on Match TV and streamed for free on Sportrecs.com
Spain	GOL; TEN	Home games live and free on either GOL or TEN, deferred broadcasts on GOL
Europe	Rugby Europe	All games exclusively streamed and free on Rugby Europe (registration required). Some games are streamed and free on Rugby Europe Youtube channel

== See also ==
- Rugby Europe International Championships
- Antim Cup
- Kiseleff Cup
- Six Nations Championship
