= Tskhadadze (surname) =

Tskhadadze (Georgian: ცხადაძე) is a surname. Notable people with the surname include:

- Bachana Tskhadadze (born 1987), Georgian former football forward
- Irakli Tskhadadze (born 1996), Georgian rugby union player
- Kakhaber Tskhadadze (born 1968), Georgian football manager and former footballer
