= Giorgi Kharaishvili (rugby union) =

Georgian rugby union player (born 1999)

- Born: Gia Kharaishvili; 13 February 1999 (age 27) Khashuri, Georgia
- Height: 1.87 m (6 ft 1 1/2 in)
- Weight: 120 kg (18 st 13 lb; 260 lb)

Rugby union career
- Position: Tighthead prop
Youth career
- 20??-2017: Khashuri
Senior career
Years	Team	Apps	(Points)
2017–2018	RC Armazi	1	(5)
2018-	Racing 92	55	(0)
2022	→ USON Nevers (loan)	11	(5)
- Correct as of 11 March 2025
International career
Years	Team	Apps	(Points)
2016-2017	Georgia under-18	6	(0)
2018-2019	Georgia under-20	4	(0)
2021	Georgia	5	(0)
- Correct as of 11 March 2025

Gia Kharaishvili (Georgian: გიორგი ხარაიშვილი, born 13 February 1999 in Khashuri, Georgia) is a rugby union player who currently plays for Racing 92 in the Top 14. He previously played for RC Armazi in the Didi 10.

== Career ==
He began his career at his home town club in Khashuri, strong performances led to him being selected to play in the 2017 Rugby Europe under-18 Championship.

He joined RC Armazi in the Didi 10, later being selected for the Georgia under-20 for the 2018 World Rugby Under 20 Championship. In 2018 he was signed by Top 14 side Racing 92, making his debut in a 32–11 loss against Lyon.

He made his debut for Georgia in the 2021 Rugby Europe Championship, playing in all 5 matches however only started in 1, playing 52 minutes against Spain.

In 2022 USON Nevers signed Kharaishvili on loan to help strengthen the depth in the tight head position.

== Honours ==
=== Georgia under-18 ===
- Rugby Europe under-18 Championship
  - Runners-up: (1) 2017

=== Georgia ===
- Rugby Europe Championship
  - Champions: (1) 2021
