= Nikita Vavilin =

Russian rugby union player

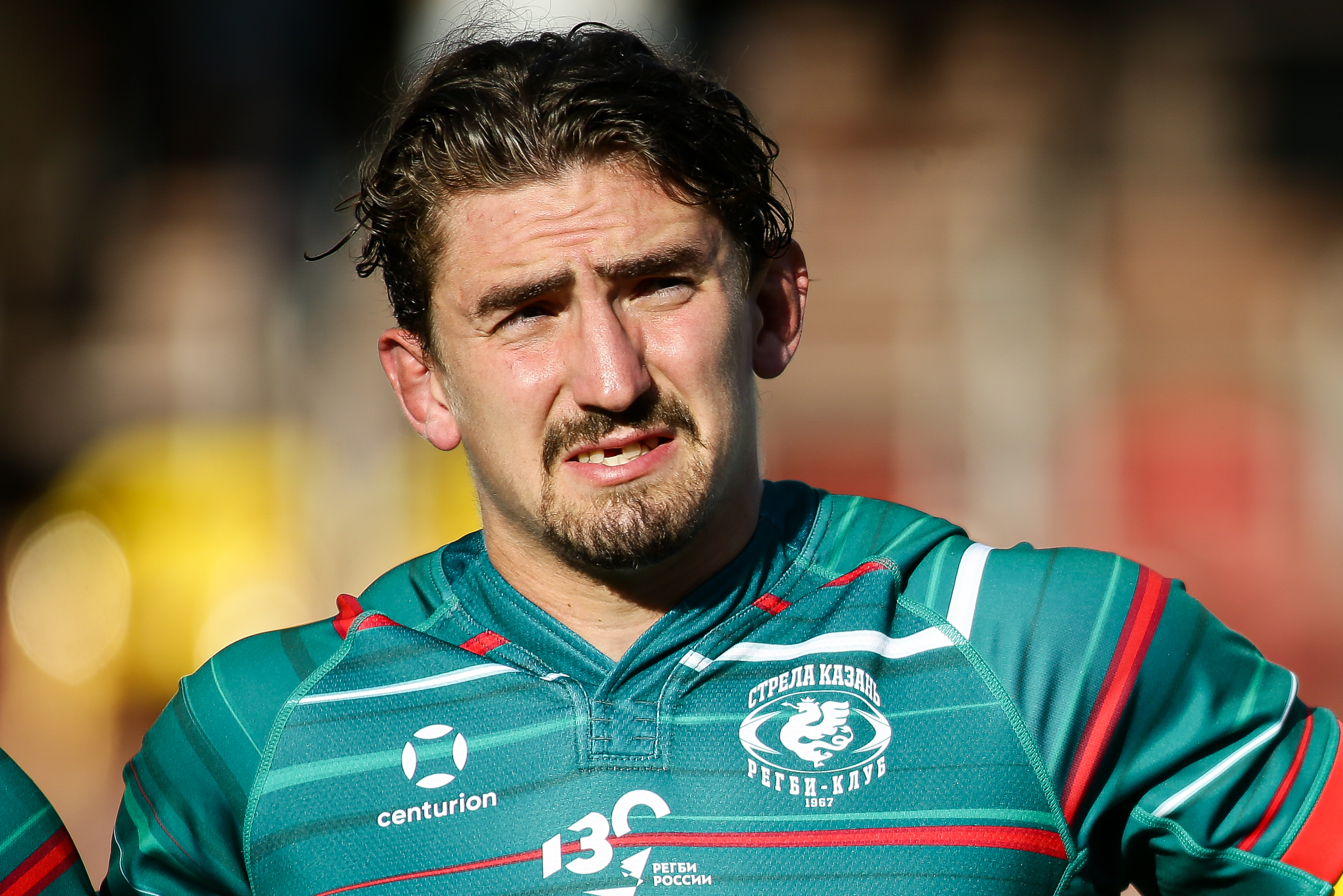
- Born: 13 May 1994 (age 32) Moscow
- Height: 188 cm (6 ft 2 in)
- Weight: 100 kg (220 lb)

Rugby union career
- Position: Flanker
- Current team: Strela-Agro Kazan
Senior career
Years	Team	Apps	(Points)
2013	RC Zelenograd		
2014	Fili Moscow	11	(5)
2015–2022	Slava Moscow		
2022–present	Strela-Agro Kazan		
- Correct as of 14 September 2022
International career
Years	Team	Apps	(Points)
2018–present	Russia	24	(15)
- Correct as of 14 July 2022

Nikita Vavilin (born 13 May 1994) is a Russian rugby union player who generally plays as a flanker represents Russia internationally.

He was included in the Russian squad for the 2019 Rugby World Cup which is scheduled to be held in Japan for the first time and also marks his first World Cup appearance.

== Career ==
He made his international debut for Russia against Germany on 18 March 2018.
