= Johann Tromp =

Namibian rugby union player

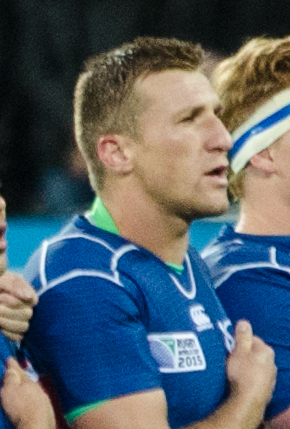
- Tromp with Namibia in 2015
- Full name: Johannes Adriaan Tromp
- Born: 23 December 1990 (age 35) Windhoek, Namibia
- Height: 1.83 m (6 ft 0 in)
- Weight: 91 kg (14 st 5 lb; 201 lb)
- School: Windhoek Technical High School, Windhoek Gymnasium
- University: University of Pretoria, ETA Sport Conditioning

Rugby union career
- Position: Scrum-half / Fullback
Youth career
- 2010–2011: (South Africa) Pumas
Senior career
Years	Team	Apps	(Points)
2011-2013	(Namibia) Western Suburbs RC	-	(-)
2014–2015	(Namibia) Wanderers RC	-	(-)
2015–2016	(Namibia) Welwitschias	14	(41)
2016–2017	(South Africa) Eastern Province Kings	8	(15)
2017	(South Africa) Southern Kings	1	(0)
2017–2020	(Namibia) Welwitschias	12	(50)
2020-	(Russia) Strela	23	(64)
- Correct as of 11 January 2024
International career
Years	Team	Apps	(Points)
2009	Namibia under-20	4	(24)
2012–2022	Namibia	45	(100)
- Correct as of 11 January 2024

Johannes Adriaan Tromp (born 23 December 1990) is a Namibian rugby union player, who plays with Strela from Kazan in domestic rugby in Russia. He was named in Namibia's squad for the 2015 Rugby World Cup. He plays as a scrum-half or fullback.

== Career ==
=== Club career ===
He played junior rugby at the Pumas. He played for the Welwitschias in the Vodacom Cup and Provincial Cup, before moving to Eastern Province in the Currie Cup. He made a single appearance for the Southern Kings in a 2017 Super Rugby round 4 loss against the Sharks, Tromp coming off the bench for 13 minutes.

In 2017 he returned to the Welwitschias, where he spent 2 seasons before moving to Russia playing for Strela-Agro Kazan in the Russian Rugby Championship.

=== International career ===
He played in the 2009 IRB Junior World Rugby Trophy, with Namibia coming 5th in the tournament, only losing to the USA in the pool stages.

He earned his first cap on the 10 November 2012 against Zimbabwe in Windhoek. He featured in all of Namibias matches in the 2015 Rugby World Cup scored 2 tries against Tonga and Argentina. He again featured in the 2019 Rugby World Cup, playing in 3 matches. He retired from international rugby in 2022.
