= German Davydov =

Russian rugby union player (born 1994)

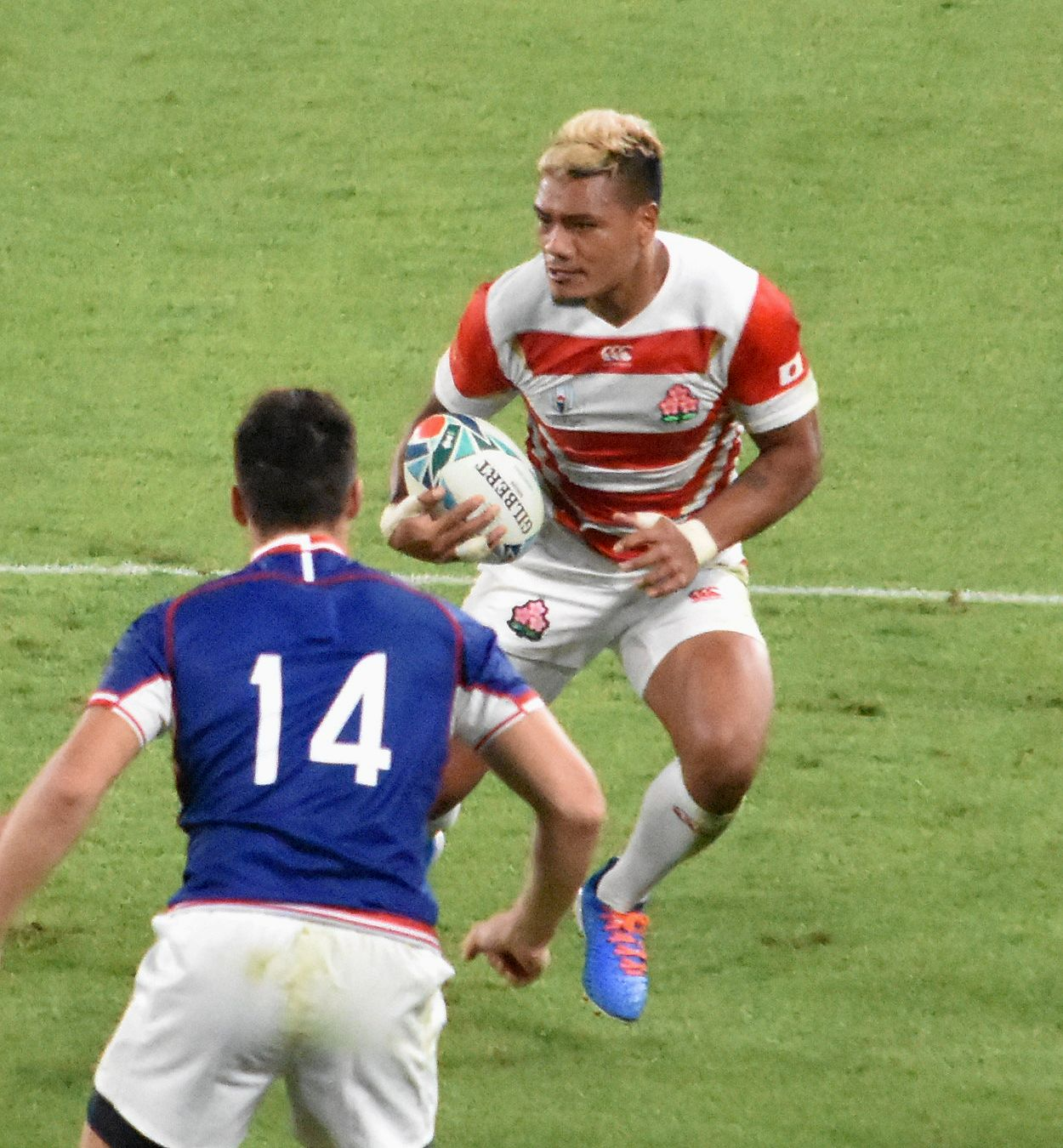
- German Davydov of Russia (number 14) and Lomano Lemeki of Japan in action during the 2019 Rugby World Cup
- Born: 10 March 1994 (age 32)
- Height: 186 cm (6 ft 1 in)
- Weight: 99 kg (218 lb)

Rugby union career
- Position: Fly half
- Current team: Strela Kazan
Senior career
Years	Team	Apps	(Points)
2013–2022	VVA-Podmoskovye		
2022–present	Strela Kazan		
- Correct as of 11 July 2022
International career
Years	Team	Apps	(Points)
2014–present	Russia	31	(35)
- Correct as of 7 February 2022
Medal record
Men's rugby sevens
Representing Russia
Summer Universiade
Gold medal – first place	2013 Kazan	Team competition

German Davydov (born 10 March 1994) is a Russian rugby union player who generally plays as a fly half represents Russia internationally.

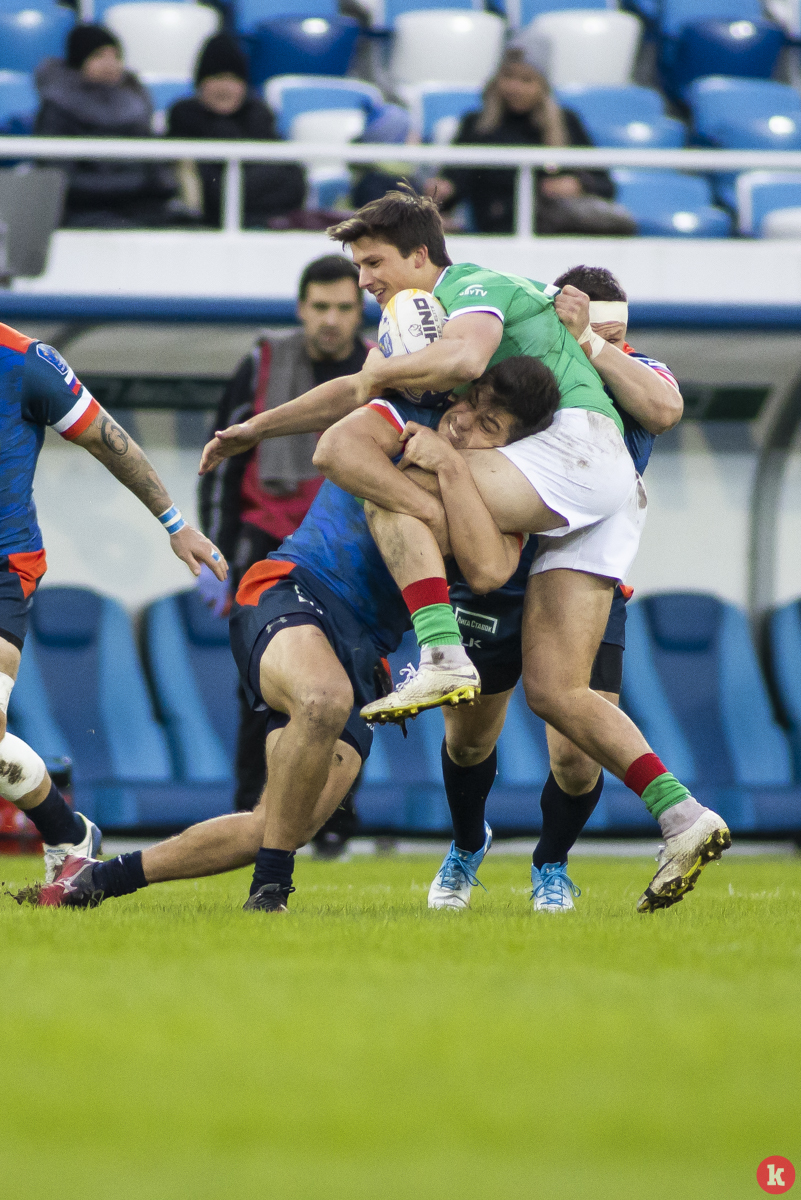
Davydov in action against Portugal during a match in February 2020

== Career ==
He was called up to join the Russian rugby sevens team for the 2013 Summer Universiade and was subsequently a key member of the team which won the gold medal in the men's rugby sevens tournament.

He made his international debut for Russia against Emerging Ireland on 13 June 2014 at the 2014 IRB Nations Cup.

He was selected to the Russian squad for the 2017–18 World Rugby Sevens Series. He was also named in the national squad for the men's tournament at the 2018 Rugby World Cup Sevens.

He was included in the Russian squad for the 2019 Rugby World Cup which was held in Japan for the first time and also marked his first World Cup appearance. He was also part of the national side which participated at the 2020 Rugby Europe Championship and 2021 Rugby Europe Championship.
