= Rodrigo Marta =

Portuguese Rugby Union Player

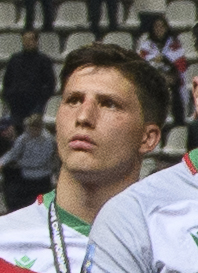
- Born: Rodrigo de Bivar Weinholtz Cardoso Marta; 18 November 1999 (age 26) Portugal
- Height: 185 cm (6 ft 1 in)
- Weight: 90 kg (198 lb; 14 st 2 lb)

Rugby union career
- Position: Outside Centre / Winger
- Current team: Colomiers
Amateur team(s)
Years	Team	Apps	(Points)
2020–2022	Belenenses		
Senior career
Years	Team	Apps	(Points)
2021–2022	Lusitanos XV	6	(25)
2022–2023	Dax	20	(85)
2023–	Colomiers	9	(5)
- Correct as of 25 January 2024
International career
Years	Team	Apps	(Points)
2018–2019	Portugal U20	8	(20)
2018–	Portugal	29	(125)
- Correct as of 19 February 2023
National sevens team
Years	Team		Comps
2017–2019	Portugal		4 (2t)

Rodrigo Marta (born 18 November 1999) is a Portuguese rugby union player who currently plays for Pau in the French Top 14. He is Portugal's record try scorer with 25 tries in 29 caps.

== Career ==
In 2021 he was named part of the Lusitanos XV squad for the inaugural Rugby Europe Super Cup. The Lusitanos came in 2nd place falling short against the Black Lion in the final.

He joined French Nationale 1 side US Dax in 2022 where he is currently leading the Nationale 1 try scoring table with 10 tries in 13 games.

He signed a 3-year contract with ProD2 side US Colomiers from 2023 to 2026, joining fellow Portuguese teammate Jose Lima.

== International career ==
Marta made his international debut coming off the bench in the 40th minute in the 2017–18 Rugby Europe International Championships promotion match against Romania.

In 2023 after scoring 4 tries in a match against Poland in the Rugby Europe Championship, Marta became his nations top try scorer.

== Honours ==
- 2018–19 Rugby Europe Trophy (Portugal)
- 2021–22 CN Honra (Belenenses)
- RWC 2023 Final Qualification Tournament (Portugal)
