= Valery Morozov =

Valeriy Morozov
- Born: 21 September 1994 (age 32) Moscow, Russia
- Height: 1.91 m (6 ft 3 in)
- Weight: 115 kg (18 st 2 lb)

Rugby union career
- Position: Loosehead Prop
- Current team: Bath
Senior career
Years	Team	Apps	(Points)
20??–2015	RC Zelenograd	-	(-)
2015–2018	Enisei-STM	56	(60)
2019–2021	Sale Sharks	37	(15)
2021	CSKA Moscow	11	(0)
2021–2022	Bath	13	(0)
2022	Worcester Warriors	2	(0)
2022–2023	Bath	11	(0)
2023–	Krasny Yar Krasnoyarsk	8	(10)
- Correct as of 13 April 2023
International career
Years	Team	Apps	(Points)
2016–2022	Russia	33	(10)
- Correct as of 5 January 2024

Valeriy Morozov (Russian: Валерий Морозов) (born 21 September 1994) is a Russian professional rugby union player for Bath and the Russian National Team. His position is loosehead prop. He has previously played for Sale Sharks and Worcester Warriors in the Premiership.

== Background ==
Born in Moscow, Russia, from the age of 7 Valeriy was engaged in volleyball, fulfilled the standard of a candidate for the master of sports. At the age of 14, he realized that he does not have a great sports future in volleyball, his height of 1.91 was not enough for professional career. Therefore, Valery moved to the rugby section.

== Club career ==
Started playing rugby in his hometown Zelenograd. Then he began to play for the local amateur club in the position Number 8. At the end of 2015, Valeriy signed a contract for 3 years with the professional club Enisei-STM. Changed position on the field and began to play prop. He won all possible titles in Russia. In December 2018, Valeriy signed a contract with the English club Sale Sharks. Thanks to the recommendations of Andrei Ostrikov and Vadim Cobilas. On 9 March 2019 Valery was named as Man of the Match as he scored in Sale's Premiership Rugby win over Leicester Tigers.

On 23 June 2021 Sale Sharks confirmed that he would be leaving the club at the end of the 2020–21 season. He returned to Russia to play at CSKA Rugby in Moscow.

Morozov returned to England later on that year with Bath Rugby announcing on the 29 December that he would be joining the club as cover for the injured Beno Obano until the end of the season.

He signed for Worcester Warriors for the 2022–23 season but returned to Bath on 3 October 2022 as short-term injury cover. Worcester Warriors entered administration and all players' contracts were subsequently terminated on 5 October 2022.

== International career ==
Valeriy's debut for the Russian national team was on 11 November 2016 in Hong Kong against Zimbabwe, where he helped the Russian "Bears" win the 2016 Cup of Nations. His debut try was in the match against Romania in the 2017 Rugby Europe Championship.

=== International tries ===
As of 19 November 2021

Try	Opposing team	Location	Venue	Competition	Date	Result	Score
1	Romania	Sochi, Russia	Sochi Central Stadium	2017 Rugby Europe Championship	4 March 2017	Loss	10 – 30
2	Netherlands	Amsterdam, Netherlands	NRCA Stadium	2021 Rugby Europe Championship	6 November 2021	Win	8 – 35

== Honours ==
- Russian Championships (3): 2016, 2017, 2018
- Russian Cup (2): 2016, 2017
- Russian Supercup (1): 2017
- European Rugby Continental Shield (2): 2016–17, 2017–18
- Premiership Rugby Cup: 2019–20.
- Cup of Nations (2): 2016, 2017
- World Rugby Nations Cup runner-up (1): 2017
- Rugby Europe International Championships runner-up (1): 2018
