= Samuel Marques =

Portugal international rugby union player

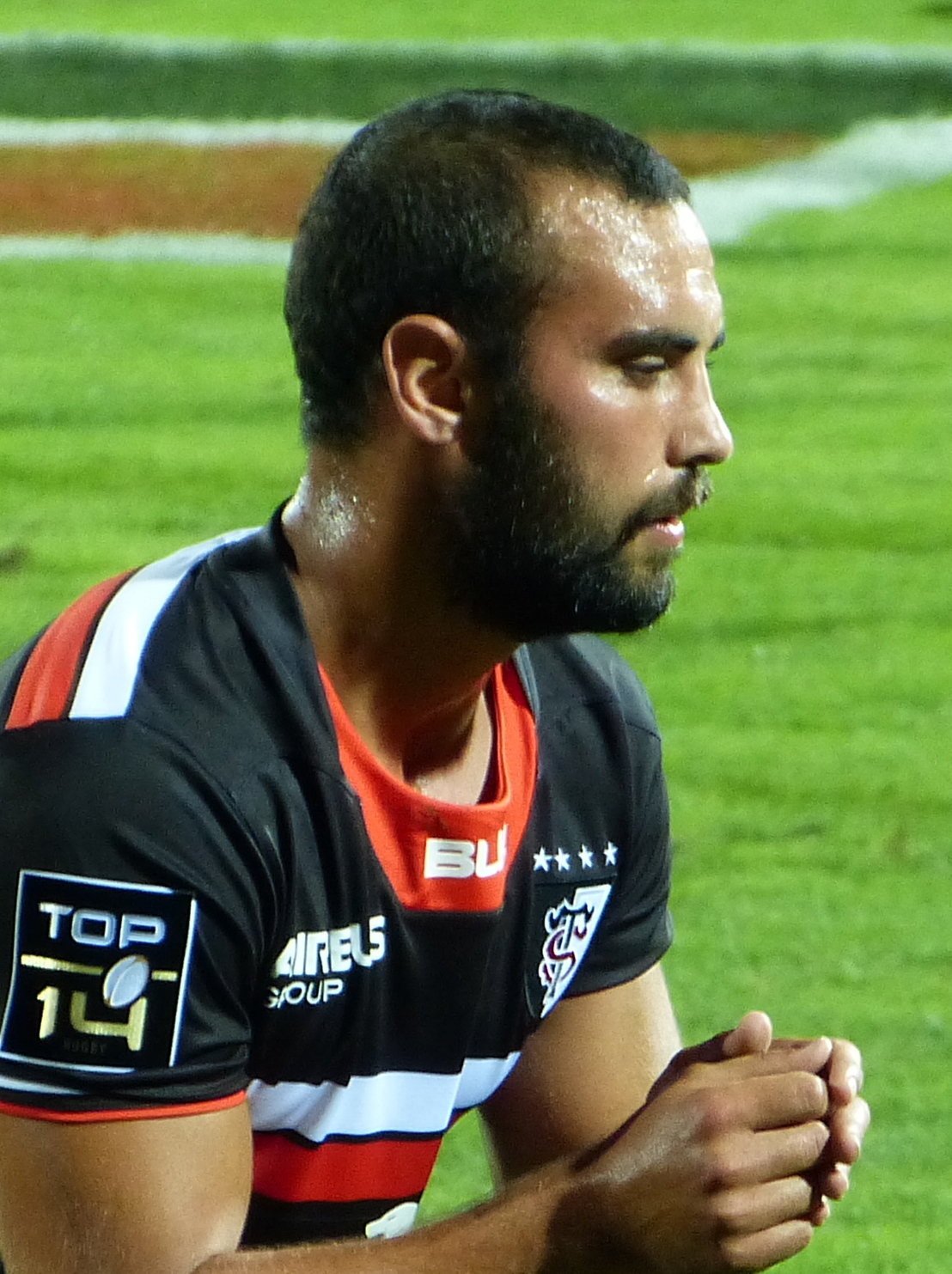
- Marques with Toulouse in 2017
- Born: 8 December 1988 (age 37) Condom, Gers, France
- Height: 177 cm (5 ft 10 in)
- Weight: 76 kg (168 lb)

Rugby union career
- Position: Scrum-half
Youth career
- 2004–2007: Eauze d'Armagnac
- 2007–2009: Pau Academy
Senior career
Years	Team	Apps	(Points)
2009–2012	Pau	36	(10)
2012–2014	Albi	55	(548)
2014–2016	Pau	54	(229)
2016–2017	Toulouse	14	(60)
2017–2019	Brive	55	(132)
2019–2021	Pau	31	(56)
2021–2023	Carcassonne	48	(353)
2023–	Béziers	0	(0)
International career
Years	Team	Apps	(Points)
2012–	Portugal	25	(233)
- Correct as of 24 October 2023

Samuel Marques (born 8 December 1988), often cited as Samuel Marquès, is a French-Portuguese rugby union player. He plays as a scrum-half. He is of Portuguese descent and represents Portugal at international level.

== Club career ==
Marques first played at US Eauze, from 2004/05 to 2006/07, before joining Section Paloise in 2007/08. He joined the first team at 2009/10, and would play there until 2011/12, at the Pro D2. He was lent to SC Albi for two seasons, 2011/12 to 2013/14, playing regularly at the Pro D2. He returned to Section Paloise, playing two seasons and being a member of the team that won the Pro D2 in 2014/15 and having his debut at the Top 14 in 2015/16. The following season he moved to Stade Toulousain (2016/17). He moved afterwards to CA Brive, playing there from 2017/18 to 2018/19, the first season at the Top 14 and the second at the Pro D2. He returned to Section Paloise for two more seasons, from 2019/20 to 2020/21. He joined US Carcassonne for the season of 2021/22, at the Pro D2.

In April 2023, it was announced that Marques had again left another club, joining Béziers in the Pro D2.

== International career ==
He has 25 caps for Portugal, since his debut at the 32–25 win over Uruguay, at 11 November 2012, in Montevideo, in a tour, aged 23 years old. He has been a regular player for his national team in more recent years and has become one of the top scorers, with 3 tries, 61 conversions and 32 penalties scored, 233 points on aggregate. Marques scored in all four of Portugal's pool matches at the 2023 Rugby World Cup including 9 points in the victory over Fiji, Portugal's first win at the Rugby World Cup tournament.
