= Mike Tadjer =

Portugal international rugby union player

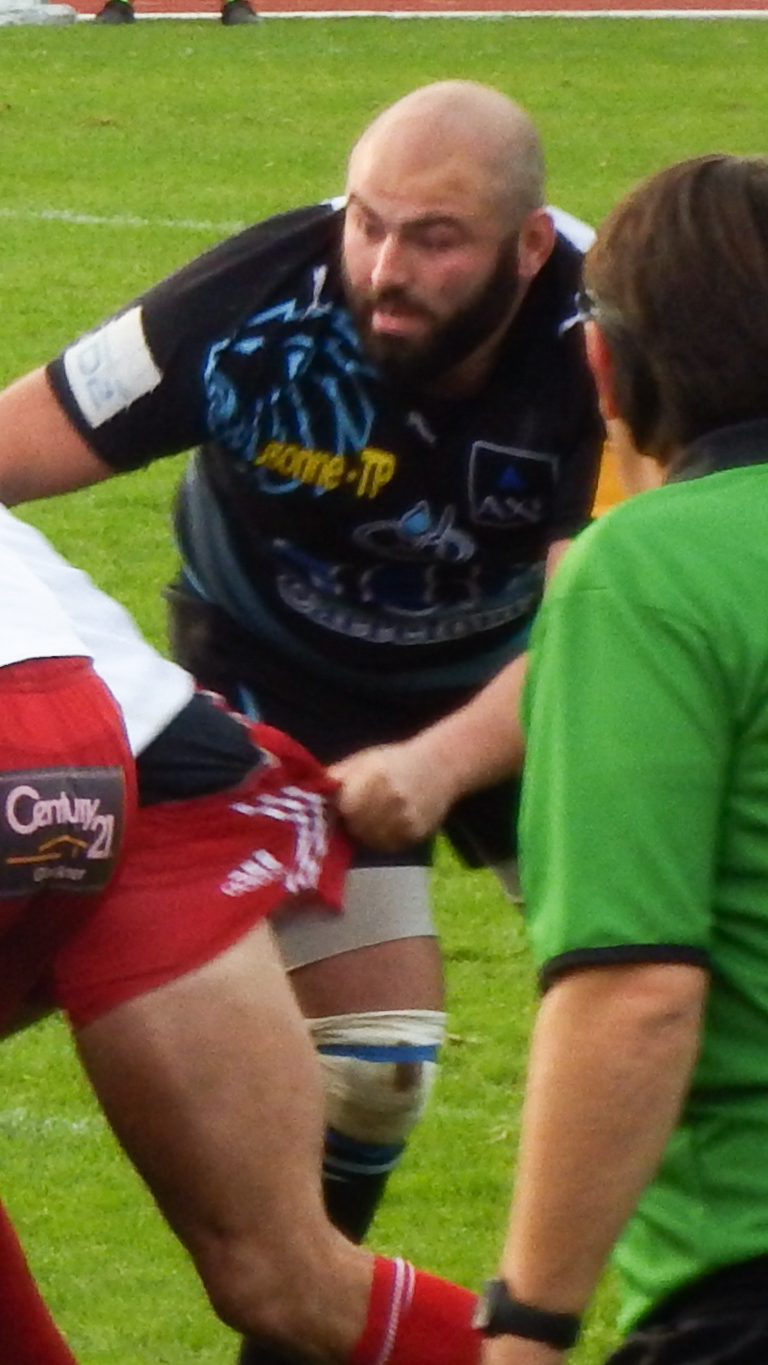
- Tadjer playing for Massy in 2014
- Born: Mike Tadjer Barbosa; 10 March 1989 (age 37) Massy, France
- Height: 1.80 m (5 ft 11 in)
- Weight: 105 kg (16 st 7 lb; 231 lb)

Rugby union career
- Position: Hooker
Senior career
Years	Team	Apps	(Points)
2007–2008	Massy		
2008–2009	Racing 92	3	(0)
2009–2015	Massy		
2015–2017	Agen	51	(10)
2017–2018	Brive	25	(15)
2018–2019	Grenoble	22	(10)
2019–2020	Clermont	13	(5)
2020–2021	Montauban	25	(5)
2021–2023	Perpignan	27	(0)
2023–	Massy	5	(0)
- Correct as of 25 January 2024
International career
Years	Team	Apps	(Points)
2011–2023	Portugal	22	(10)
- Correct as of 18 July 2023

Mike Tadjer Barbosa (born 10 March 1989) is a French-born Portuguese rugby union player who plays as a hooker for RC Massy in the Nationale, France’s third tier of rugby.

== Club career ==
He first played at RC Massy, where he joined the first team in 2007/08. After a season at Racing Métro 92 (2008/09), where he won the French Pro D2, he returned to RC Massy, where he would play from 2009/10 to 2014/15. He has played since then at SU Agen (2015/16-2016/17), CA Brive (2017/18), FC Grenoble (2018/19), ASM Clermont (2019/20), US Montauban (2020/21), and currently plays for USA Perpignan, since 2021/22.

== International career ==
Tadjer earned 22 caps for Portugal, with 3 tries scored, and 15 points on aggregate. His debut was a 15-7 loss to Romania on 4 February 2012, in Bucharest, for the Six Nations B.

He was involved in Os Lobos' successful 2023 Rugby World Cup qualifying campaign. He was selected to be a part of the Portugal squad for the 2023 Rugby World Cup in France. In their last pool stage game against Fiji, Portugal claimed a historic first win at the tournament; beating Fiji 23–24. Since Portugal didn't advance to the knockout stages, it was Tadjer's last match for his nation as he announced his retirement from international rugby.

== Personal life ==
Tadjer was born in France to a Portuguese father and Syrian/Lebanese mother.
