= Alexandru Savin =

Romanian rugby union player (b. 1995)

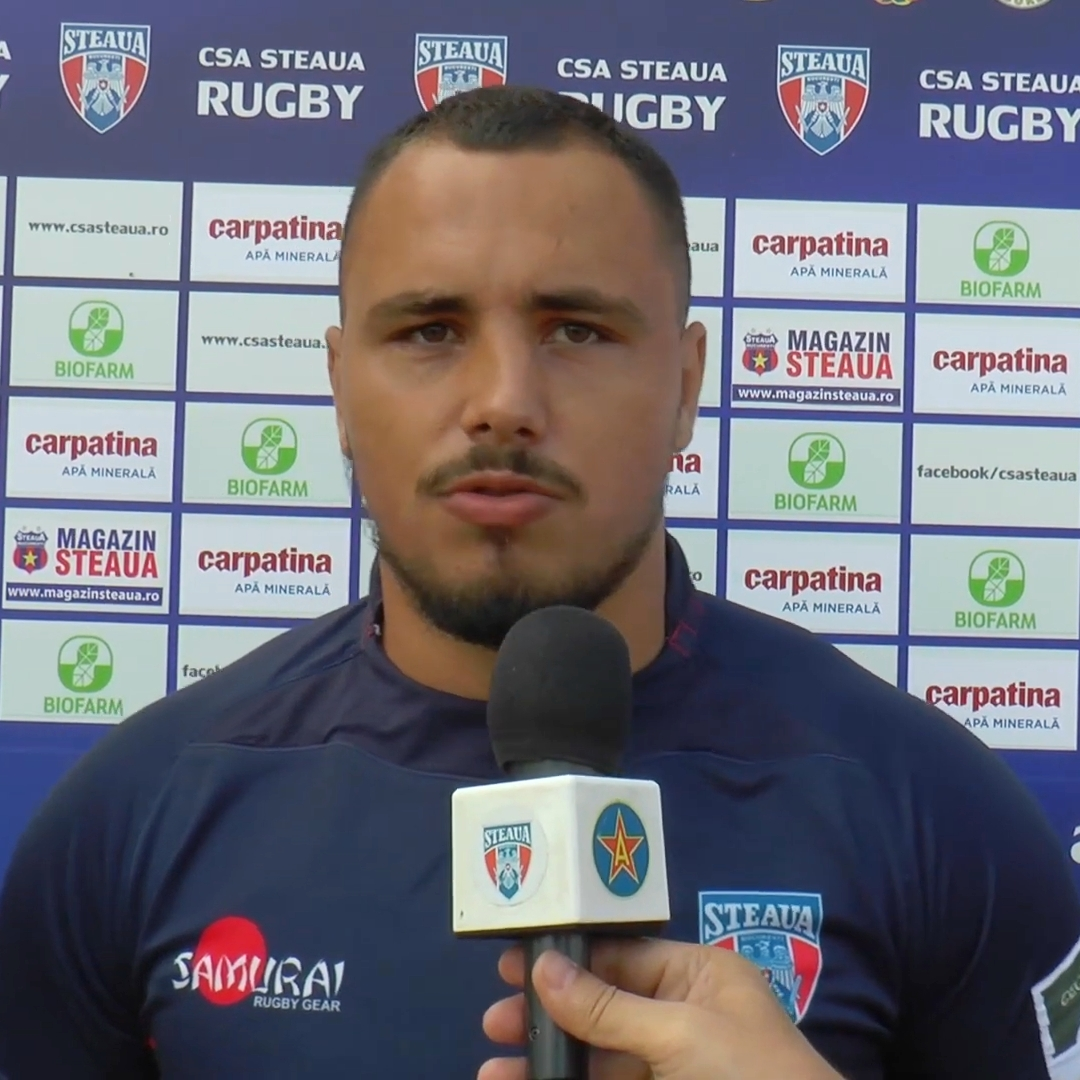
- Alexandru Savin in 2019
- Full name: Alexandru Savin
- Born: 12 February 1995 (age 31) Focșani, Romania
- Height: 1.87 m (6 ft 1 1/2 in)
- Weight: 121 kg (19 st 1 lb; 267 lb)

Rugby union career
- Position: Prop
Senior career
Years	Team	Apps	(Points)
2015–2019	CSM București	25	(0)
2019–2021	Steaua București		
2021–2022	Chambéry		
2022–	Steaua București		
- Correct as of 14 November 2018

Alexandru Savin (born 12 February 1995) is a Romanian rugby union football player. He plays as a prop for professional SuperLiga club CSM București.

== Club career ==
Alexandru Savin played for SuperLiga club, CSM București, for the 2016–17, 2017–18 and 2018–19 seasons.

== International career ==
In November 2018, Savin was called for Romania's national team, the Oaks, being part of the 34 man squad assembled in preparation for a match against the Os Lobos held for the Relegation/Promotion Play-Off of the 2018 Rugby Europe Championship.

He is the 648 Oak ever selected in the Romanian XV National Team.
