= Anthony Alves =

Portugal international rugby union player

- Born: 23 June 1989 (age 37)
- Height: 185 cm (6 ft 1 in)
- Weight: 120 kg (265 lb; 18 st 13 lb)

Rugby union career
- Position: Prop
International career
| Years | Team | Apps | (Points) |
| 2010– | Portugal | 33 | (5) |

Anthony Alphonse Alves (born 23 June 1989) is a rugby union player. He plays as a prop. He was born and raised in France, but is capped by Portugal.

== Club career ==
Alves was born in Oyonnax but moved with his family to Bourg-en-Bresse when he was two years old. He first played when he was 5 years old at SA Bourg-en-Bresse, moving afterwards to Union Sportive Bressane, where he played until 2008/09. He moved to US Montauban on 2009/10 and appeared for the main team for the first time the following season, at the Fédérale 1. He would play there until 2011/12. He played also for RC Chalon (2012/13-2013/14), Montluçon Rugby (2014/15), Stade Aurillacois Cantal Auvergne (2015/16-2018/19), his first Pro D2 team, FC Grenoble (2019/20-2020/21) and plays for Stade Montois since 2021/22. Since 2015/16, he plays at the French Pro D2.

== International career ==
Alves has been playing for Portugal since he was 18 years old. He has 23 caps for the main national team since his debut at the 17–22 loss to the United States, at 13 November 2010, aged 21 years old, in a tour, and has scored 1 try, 5 points on aggregate. He has been playing for the "Lobos" since then, despite long absences, and returned to be a regular player in 2021.
