= Eugen Căpățînă =

Romanian rugby player (born 1986)

Eugen Căpăţână
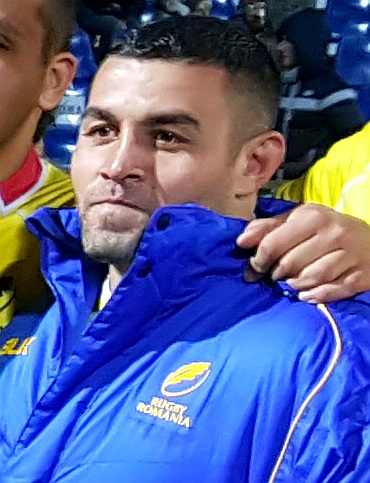
- Eugen Căpăţână in 2016 after winning the Pershing Trophy against USA
- Born: Marian Eugen Căpăţână; 18 June 1986 (age 40) Balş, Romania
- Height: 6 ft 0 in (1.83 m)
- Weight: 16 st 7.5 lb (231.5 lb; 105.0 kg)

Rugby union career
- Position: Hooker
Senior career
Years	Team	Apps	(Points)
2013–14	București Wolves	5	(0)
- Correct as of 27 August 2015
Provincial / State sides
Years	Team	Apps	(Points)
2011–12	Steaua București	10	(0)
2012–	Timișoara Saracens	38	(25)
- Correct as of 5 December 2015
International career
Years	Team	Apps	(Points)
2012–	Romania	34	(15)
- Correct as of 31 May 2017

Marian Eugen Căpăţână (born 18 June 1986) is a Romanian rugby union footballer. He plays the position of Hooker.

He played for Steaua București during the 2011/12 season. He has been playing for Timișoara Saracens since 2012, in the SuperLiga. He also played for București Wolves.

He has 18 caps for Romania, since 2012, with 2 tries scored, 10 points on aggregate. He has won a European Champion Trophy. He was called for the 2015 Rugby World Cup, but was not capped.
