= Adrian Moțoc =

Romanian rugby union player

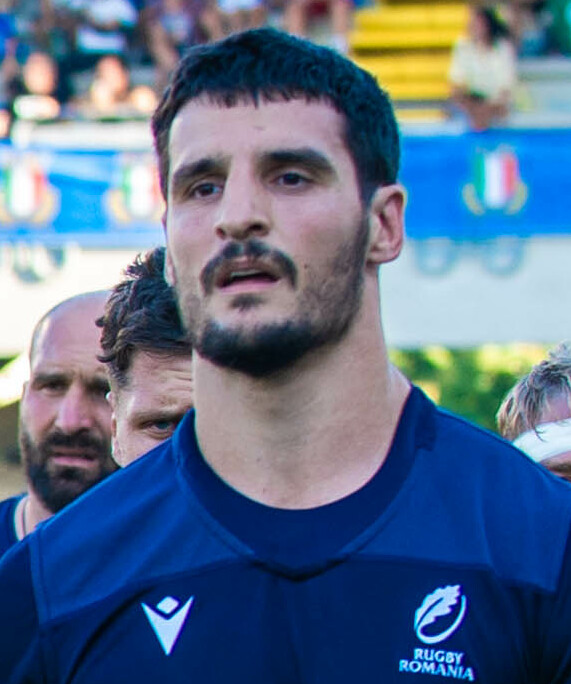
- Full name: Adrian Moțoc
- Born: 11 July 1996 (age 30) Saumur, France
- Height: 1.96 m (6 ft 5 in)
- Weight: 114 kg (17 st 13 lb; 251 lb)

Rugby union career
- Position: Lock
- Current team: Biarritz
Youth career
- 2007–2015: Steaua București
- 2015–2017: Racing Métro 92
Senior career
Years	Team	Apps	(Points)
2017–2018	Racing 92	1	(0)
2018–2020	Agen	20	(0)
2020–2021	Massy	0	(0)
2021–2022	Aurillac	20	(10)
2022–	Biarritz	13	(0)
- Correct as of 26 October 2023
International career
Years	Team	Apps	(Points)
2017–present	Romania	30	(0)
- Correct as of 26 October 2023

Adrian Moțoc (born 11 July 1996 in Saumur) is a Romanian professional rugby union player. He currently plays as a lock for Pro D2 club, Biarritz.

== Club career ==
Adrian Moțoc started playing rugby with Romanian club Steaua București and from 2015 he was selected to join Top 14 club, Racing 92. After three years with Racing, Adrian signed in April 2018 a two-year contract with Top 14 side Agen.

== International career ==
In November 2017, he was called for Romania's national team, the Oaks, making his international debut during Week 6 of the 2017 end-of-year rugby union internationals in a match against ʻIkale Tahi.
