= Raffaele Storti =

Portuguese rugby union player (born 2000)

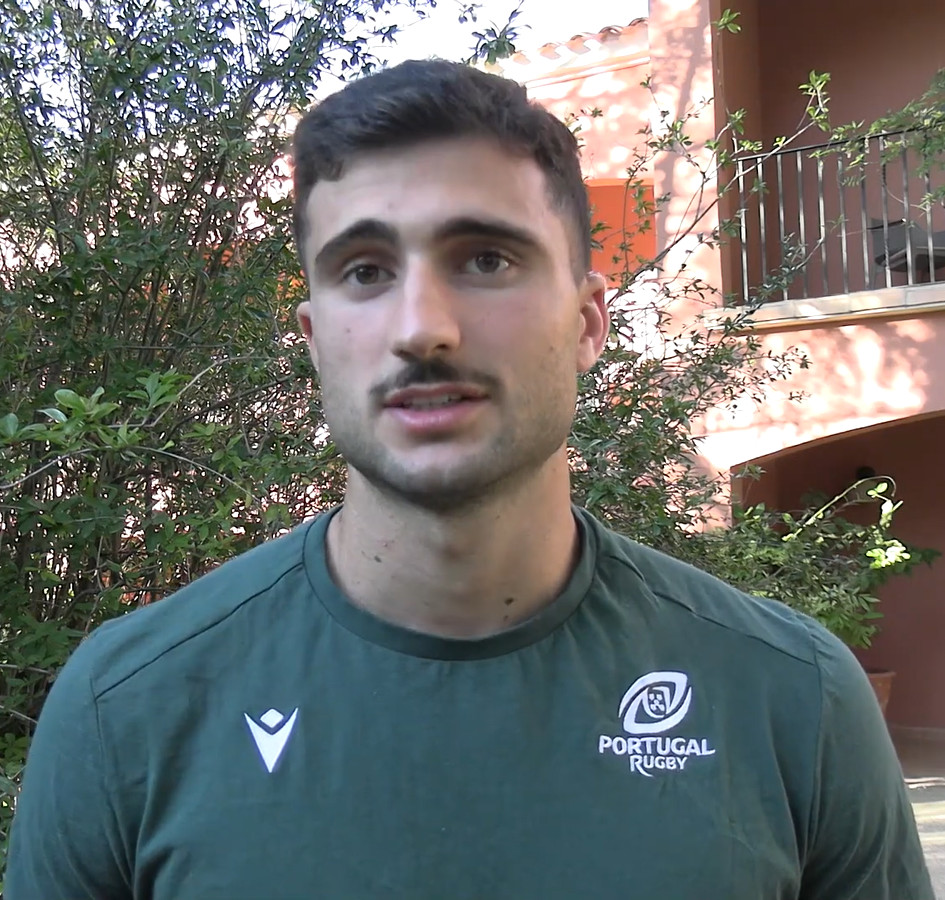
- Storti in 2023
- Born: Raffaele Costa Storti; 19 December 2000 (age 25) Lisbon, Portugal
- Height: 1.78 m (5 ft 10 in)
- Weight: 88 kg (194 lb)

Rugby union career
- Position: Winger
Senior career
| Years | Team | Apps | (Points) |
| -2019 | Técnico | | |
| 2020 | Peñarol Rugby | 1 | (0) |
| 2020-2021 | Técnico | | |
| 2021-2022 | Stade Français | 0 | (0) |
| 2022-2024 | AS Béziers | 31 | (155) |
| 2024- | Stade Français | 2 | (5) |
- Correct as of 2 March 2025
International career
| Years | Team | Apps | (Points) |
| 2019 | Portugal U20 | 4 | (45) |
| 2019- | Portugal | 24 | (80) |
- Correct as of 16 March 2024
National sevens team
| Years | Team | | Comps |
| 2019– | Portugal 7s | | 11 (15) |
- Correct as of 31 August 2021

Raffaele Costa Storti (born 19 December 2000) is a Portuguese rugby union player, who plays for Stade Français in the French Top 14.

== Club career ==
Having played for CR Técnico until 2019, Storti then joined the new Peñarol Rugby franchise in Uruguay. But just after he made his debut in the Súper Liga Americana, the league was quickly brought to a halt because of the COVID-19 pandemic, and the young Portuguese returned to his former club in his home country, to compete in the 2020-2021 season.

On the 31 August 2021, he signed for the Top 14 side Stade Français.

== International career ==
A standout player at the 2019 under-20 Trophy with Portugal, scoring the most tries in the competition, Storti quickly became part of the senior team, appearing to be one of rugby union most promising prospects outside of Tier 1 nations.

On September 23, 2023, Storti scored two tries against Georgia which ended in an 18-18 draw. This result gave Portugal their first ever points in a Rugby World Cup. In the last pool stage game of the 2023 Rugby World Cup he scored the first try in the country’s first ever win in the competition against Fiji.
