= Tudor Boldor =

Romanian rugby union player

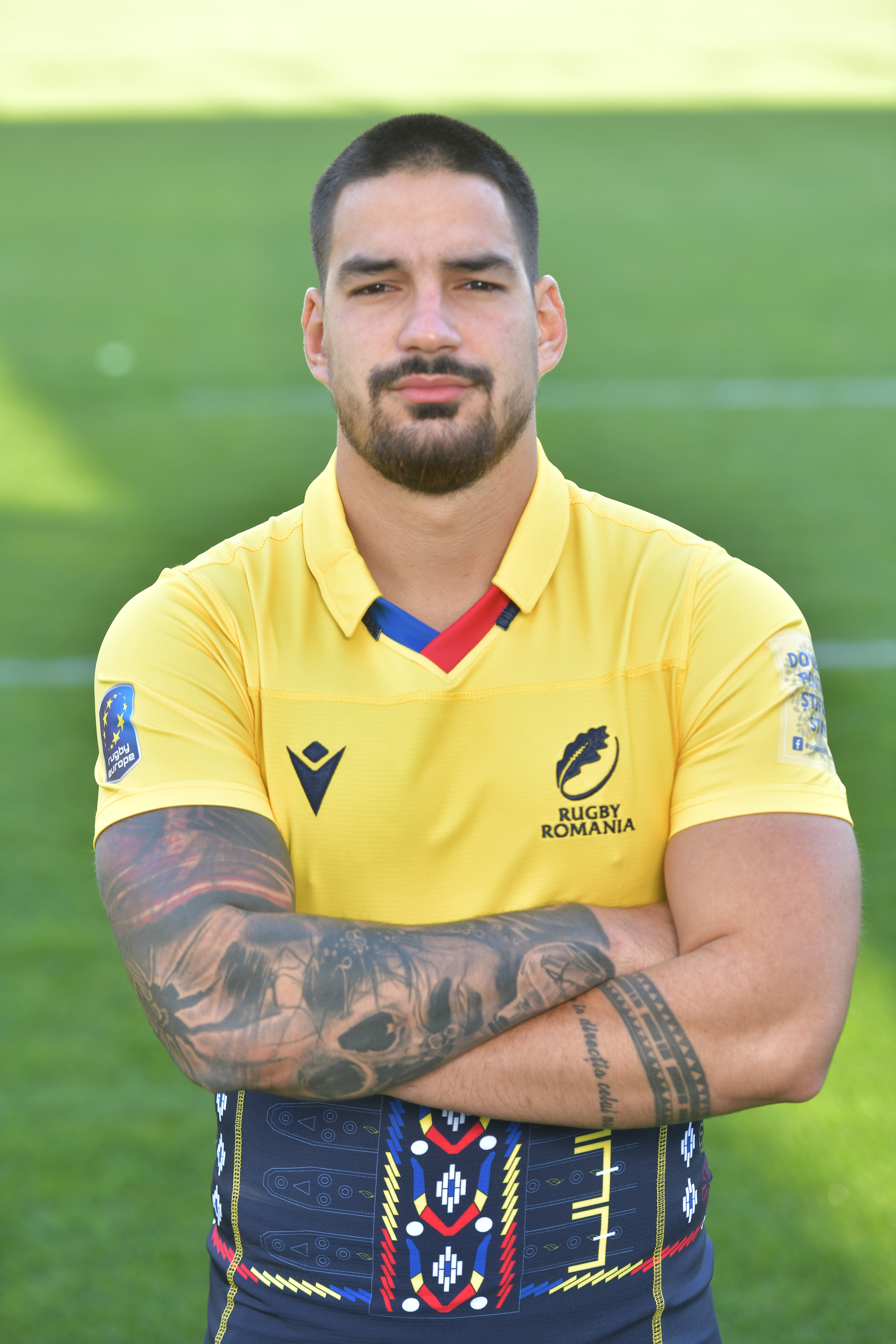
- Boldor with Romania in 2021
- Full name: Tudor-Andrei Boldor Boghiță
- Born: 29 November 1997 (age 28) Romania
- Height: 1.82 m (5 ft 11 1/2 in)
- Weight: 89 kg (14 st 0 lb; 196 lb)
- Notable relative(s): Daniel Boldor (father), Ana Boldor (sister), Maria Boldor (sister)

Rugby union career
- Position: Fly-half
- Current team: SCM Timișoara.
Senior career
Years	Team	Apps	(Points)
2016–2022	Steaua București	39	(174)
2022–2024	Dinamo București		
2024–	SCM Timișoara		
- Correct as of 31 December 2020
International career
Years	Team	Apps	(Points)
- Romania U-20
2018–present	Romania	13	(26)
- Correct as of 20 May 2023

Tudor-Andrei Boldor Boghiță (born 29 November 1997) is a Romanian rugby union player. He plays as a fly-half for Liga Națională de Rugby club SCM Timișoara.

== International career ==
In November 2018, he was called for Romania's national team, the Oaks, making his international debut during Week 3 of the 2018 end-of-year rugby union internationals in a match against the Eagles.

He is the 646 Oak ever selected in the Romanian XV National Team with 11 caps, 1 try, 5 conversions, 3 penalty kicks.

== Personal life ==
Tudor Boldor is the son of former rugby union international, Daniel Boldor, and brother of fencing champions Ana Boldor and Maria Boldor.

In January 2021 he started a contract as an image athlete for Under Armour through Kvantum Sport company.
