= Cristi Chirică =

Romania international rugby union player

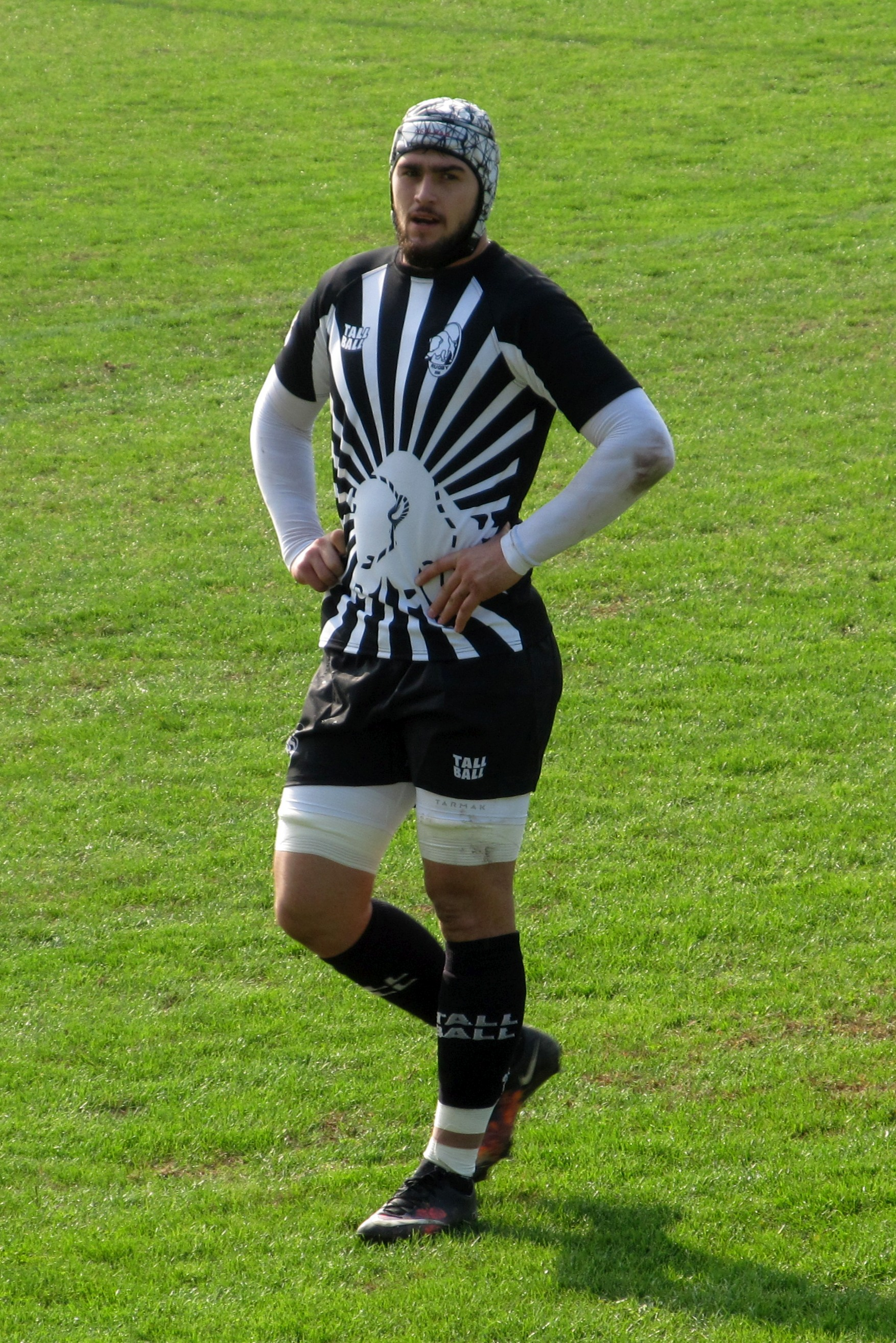
- Cristi Chirică playing for CSM Baia Mare in 2019
- Full name: Christian Marian Chirică
- Born: 9 April 1997 (age 29) Bârlad, Romania
- Height: 192 cm (6 ft 4 in)
- Weight: 115 kg (254 lb; 18 st 2 lb)

Rugby union career
- Position: Backrow
- Current team: RC Hyères
Youth career
- 2011-2015: RC Bârlad
Senior career
Years	Team	Apps	(Points)
2015-2020	CSM Baia Mare	35	(50)
2020-2022	SC Pamiers	19	(30)
2022-	RC Hyères	12	(5)
- Correct as of 5 August 2023
International career
Years	Team	Apps	(Points)
2014-2015	Romania under-17	??	(??)
2014-2015	Romania under-18	??	(??)
2016	Romania under-20	??	(??)
2016	Romania A	3	(0)
2016-	Romania	29	(30)
- Correct as of 5 August 2023

Cristian Marian Chirică (born 9 April 1997) is a Romanian rugby union player. He plays as a flanker for professional SuperLiga club CSM Baia Mare.

== Club career ==
Chirică started playing rugby as a youth for a local Romanian club based in Bârlad. In July 2015 he started his professional journey joining SuperLiga side, CSM Baia Mare.

== International career ==
Chirică is also selected for Romania's national team, the Oaks, making his international debut in a test match against the Canucks on 19 November 2016.
