= Mikheil Alania =

Georgian rugby union player

- Born: November 19, 2000 (age 25) Tbilisi, Georgia
- Height: 1.78 m (5 ft 10 in)
- Weight: 76 kg (12 st 0 lb)

Rugby union career
- Position: Scrum-half
Senior career
Years	Team	Apps	(Points)
2018-2020	RC Jiki Gori	2	(0)
2020-2025	Aurillac	76	(40)
2025-	Vannes	25	(15)
- Correct as of 6 July 2026
International career
Years	Team	Apps	(Points)
2017-2019	Georgia U20	5	(5)
2020-	Georgia	22	(25)
- Correct as of 5 July 2026

Mikheil Alania (born November 19, 2000) is a Georgian rugby union player. He plays as Scrum-half for Aurillac in the Pro D2. He was called into the Georgia U20 squad for 2018 World Rugby Under 20 Championship. He made his international debut in the Autumn Nations Cup against Ireland coming off the bench.
