= André Gorin =

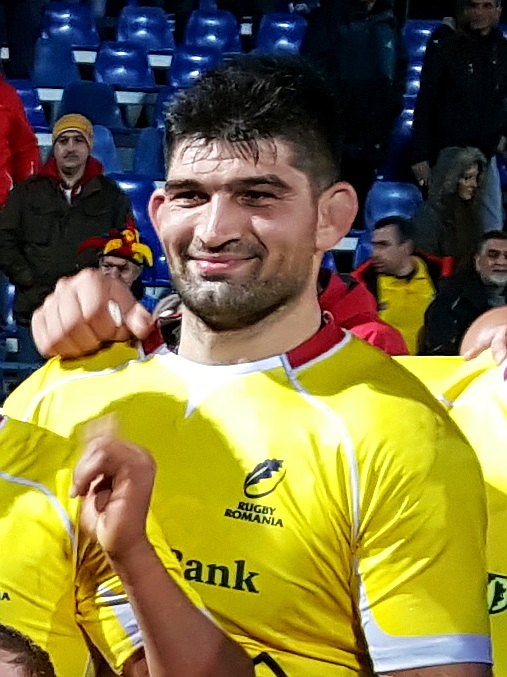
- Andre Gorin in 2016 after winning the Pershing Trophy against USA
- Born: Andrei Costinel Gorcioaia; 30 November 1987 (age 38)
- Height: 1.92 m (6 ft 3 1/2 in)
- Weight: 112 kg (17 st 9 lb; 247 lb)

Rugby union career
- Position: Flanker
Provincial / State sides
Years	Team	Apps	(Points)
2012–16	Valence d'Agen	70	(55)
2016–19	RC Massy	57	(20)
2019–	Aviron Bayonnais	15	(10)
- Correct as of 25 December 2020
International career
Years	Team	Apps	(Points)
2009–	Romania	31	(25)
- Correct as of 25 December 2020

Andrei Costinel Gorcioaia, known professionally as André (or Andrei) Gorin; born 30 November 1987) is a Romanian rugby union player. He plays in the flanker position for amateur Fédérale 1 club Valence d'Agen. He also plays for Romania's national team the Oaks.
