= Marius Iftimiciuc =

Romanian rugby union player (b. 1997)

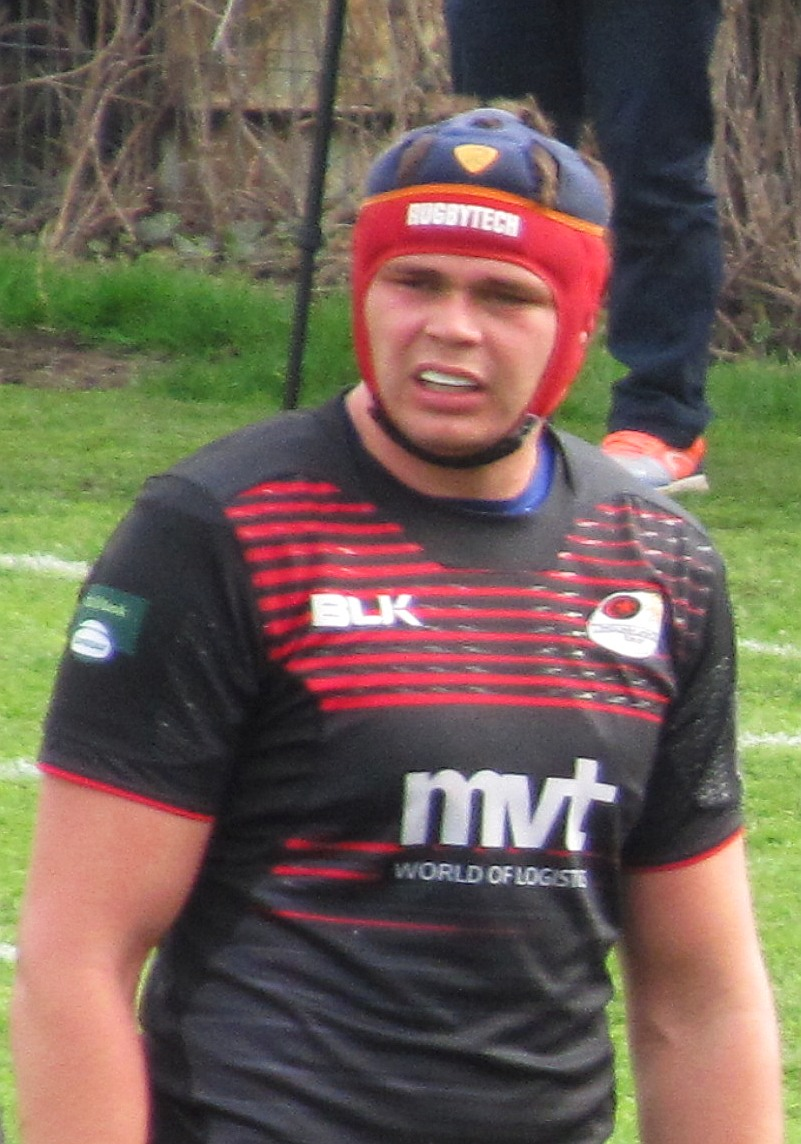
- Marius Iftimiciuc playing for Timișoara Saracens during the 2019 Cupa României Final
- Full name: Marius Iftimiciuc
- Born: 13 August 1997 (age 29) Iasi Romania
- Height: 2.02 m (6 ft 7 1/2 in)
- Weight: 127 kg (20 st 0 lb; 280 lb)
- University: Universitatea de Vest din Timișoara

Rugby union career
- Position: Lock
- Current team: CA Périgueux
Senior career
Years	Team	Apps	(Points)
2016–2018	Timișoara Saracens	27	(0)
2018	Dinamo București	4	(0)
2018–2020	Timișoara Saracens	7	(0)
2020-	CA Périgueux		
- Correct as of 17 July 2020

Marius Iftimiciuc (born 13 August 1997) is a Romanian rugby union football player. He plays as a lock for professional Fédérale 1 club CA Périgueux.

== Club career ==
Marius Iftimiciuc mostly played for SuperLiga club, Timișoara Saracens, with a brief move to Dinamo București during first half of 2018.

== International career ==
In November 2018, he was called for Romania's national team, the Oaks, being part of the 34 man squad assembled in preparation for a match against the Os Lobos held for the Relegation/Promotion Play-Off of the 2018 Rugby Europe Championship.
