= Antim Cup =

Georgia–Romania rugby cup

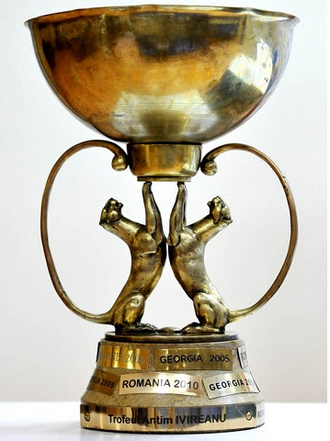
Antim Cup

The Antim Cup (Georgian: ანთიმოზ ივერიელის თასი, romanized: antimoz iverielis tasi; Romanian: Cupa Antim Ivireanul) is contested between the rugby union teams of Romania (The Oaks) and Georgia ("The Lelos"). It is named in honor of Anthim the Iberian, a Georgian theologian who served as Metropolitan of Wallachia and was a significant cultural figure for both Romania and Georgia.

The Antim Cup is contested each time Georgia and Romania meet in a senior international match other than World Cup matches. The holder retains the cup unless the challenger wins the match in normal time.

== History ==
There was a motion from the Georgia Rugby Union just before the 2000 European Nations Cup decider in Tbilisi, to establish a challenge cup along the lines of the Calcutta and Bledisloe Cups to be annually played for between the Oaks and the Lelos.

It was decided that the cup should be named after Antimoz Iverieli (Georgian version) – Antim Ivireanul (Romanian version) (c. 1650–1716). The Rugby Supporters' League (RML) of Georgia approached the Catholicos-Patriarch of All Georgia, Ilia II through influential go-betweens and received his blessing for the use of the name 'Antim'.

The trophy was made by Georgian sculptor and former rugby union player Gia Japaridze, who cast the cup in gilded bronze.

The current holder is Georgia, who defeated Romania 53–30 on 8 March 2026 in Tbilisi.

== Results ==
Year	Date	Home	Score	Away	Cup holder (Note: In the event of a draw, the previous winner retains the trophy.)	Venue
2002	6 April	Georgia	23–31	Romania	Romania	Boris Paichadze National Stadium, Tbilisi
2003	30 March	Georgia	6–19	Romania	Romania	Boris Paichadze National Stadium, Tbilisi
2004	27 May	Romania	25–18	Georgia	Romania	Agronomia Stadium, Iași
2005	12 March	Georgia	20–13	Romania	Georgia	Boris Paichadze National Stadium, Tbilisi
2006	25 February	Romania	35–10	Georgia	Romania	Stadionul Ghencea II, Bucharest
2007	3 February	Romania	17–20	Georgia	Georgia	Stadionul Dinamo II, Bucharest
2008	9 February	Georgia	22–7	Romania	Georgia	Mikheil Meskhi Stadium, Tbilisi
2009	14 March	Georgia	28–23	Romania	Georgia	Boris Paichadze National Stadium, Tbilisi
2010	13 March	Romania	22–10	Georgia	Romania	Stadionul Arcul de Triumf, Bucharest
2011	12 March	Georgia	18–11	Romania	Georgia	Mikheil Meskhi Stadium, Tbilisi
2012	10 March	Romania	13–19	Georgia	Georgia	Stadionul Arcul de Triumf, Bucharest
2013	16 March	Romania	9–9	Georgia	Georgia	Stadionul Arcul de Triumf, Bucharest
2014	15 March	Georgia	22–9	Romania	Georgia	Mikheil Meskhi Stadium, Tbilisi
2015	21 March	Romania	6–15	Georgia	Georgia	Stadionul Arcul de Triumf, Bucharest
2016	19 March	Georgia	38–9	Romania	Georgia	Boris Paichadze Dinamo Arena, Tbilisi
2017	19 March	Romania	8–7	Georgia	Romania	Stadionul Arcul de Triumf, Bucharest
2018	18 March	Georgia	25–16	Romania	Georgia	Boris Paichadze Dinamo Arena, Tbilisi
2019	9 February	Romania	9–18	Georgia	Georgia	Cluj Arena, Cluj-Napoca
2020	1 February	Georgia	41–13	Romania	Georgia	Boris Paichadze Dinamo Arena, Tbilisi
2021	28 March	Georgia	28–17	Romania	Georgia	Mikheil Meskhi Stadium, Tbilisi
2022	12 March	Romania	23–26	Georgia	Georgia	Arcul de Triumf Stadium, Bucharest
2023	5 March	Georgia	31–7	Romania	Georgia	Achvala Stadium, Tbilisi
2023	12 August	Georgia	56–6	Romania	Georgia	Mikheil Meskhi Stadium, Tbilisi
2024	2 March	Georgia	43–5	Romania	Georgia	Mikheil Meskhi Stadium, Tbilisi
2025	2 March	Georgia	43–5	Romania	Georgia	Achvala Stadium, Tbilisi
2026	7 March	Georgia	53–30	Romania	Georgia	Achvala Stadium, Tbilisi

== Summary ==
Venue	Played	Won by Georgia	Won by Romania	Drawn	Georgia points	Romania points
In Georgia	16	14	2	0	497	220
In Romania	10	5	4	1	152	167
Overall	26	19	6	1	643	387

== Honours ==
- Georgia (20): 2005, 2007, 2008, 2009, 2011, 2012, 2013, 2014, 2015, 2016, 2018, 2019, 2020, 2021, 2022, 2023 (2), 2024, 2025, 2026
- Romania (6): 2002, 2003, 2004, 2006, 2010, 2017

== See also ==
- History of rugby union matches between Georgia and Romania
- Kiseleff Cup
