= Strela-Agro Kazan =

(Russia) Strela-Ak Bars
- Full name: Регбийный клуб «Стрела-Ак Барс» Казань (Regbiynyy klub "Strela-Ak Bars" Kazan)
- Founded: 1967
- Location: Kazan
- Ground(s): Tulpar Stadium (Capacity: 3,275); Central Stadium (Capacity: 25,400)
- Coach: JP Nel
- League: Professional Rugby League
1st kit	2nd kit

Official website
- strelarugby.ru

RC Strela-Ak Bars is a rugby union club based in Kazan, Russia which plays in the Russian Professional Rugby League.

The club was known as Burevestnik Kazan (Russian: Буревестник) until 1989 and as Strela from 1989 to 2023.

== Honours ==
=== Rugby League ===
- Russian Championships (7): 1995, 1996, 1997, 1998, 1999, 2001,
- Runner-up (8): 2000, 2002, 2003, 2004, 2005, 2006, 2007, 2008
- Russian Cup (9): 1993, 1995, 1996, 1997, 1998, 1999, 2000

=== Rugby Union ===
- Russian Championships (1): 2025
- Russian Cup (2): 2023, 2025
- Russian SuperCup (2): 2024, 2025

=== Rugby 7s ===
- Russian Championships (1): 2024

== Club staff ==
Head coach – JP Nel (South Africa)

Forwards coach – Andries Bekker (South Africa)

Skills coach – Ramil Yusupov (Russia)

Strength and conditioning coach – Timur Khafizov (Russia)

Coach Analyst – Marat Ziatdinov (Russia)

Coach – Marat Khabibullin (Russia)

== Current squad ==
Props

- (South Africa) Arnout Malherbe
- (Russia) Nika Kazalikashvili
- (Russia) Anton Drozdov
- (Russia) Alexander Ryabov
- (Russia) Victor Ilkevich
- (Russia) Magomed Davudov
- (Russia) Vladislav Artemenko

Hookers

- (South Africa) Dameon Venter
- (Russia) Shamil Davudov
- (Russia) Alexey Burdin
- (Russia) Robert Sutidze

Locks

- (Russia) Nikita Arlashov
- (Russia) Bogdan Fedotko
- (Russia) Evgeny Tkachenko
- (South Africa) Rickert Korff
- (Russia) Stanislav Timoshenko

Back row

- (Russia) Evgeniy Karonnov
- (South Africa) Stephan Malan
- (Russia) Nikita Vavilin
- (Russia) Arseny Petrushynin
- (Russia) Tagir Gadjiev
- (Russia) Anton Suchev
- (Russia) Vitaliy Zhivatov

Scrum halves

- (Russia) Stepan Khokhlov
- (Russia) Grigoriy Voitenko
- (South Africa) Deon Carstens

Fly halves

- (South Africa) Kobus Marais
- (Namibia) P. W. Steenkamp

Wingers

- (Russia) Omari Grinyaev
- (Russia) Daniil Potihanov
- (Russia) Andrei Karzanov
- (Russia) Artem Radchenko

Centres

- (South Africa) Eddie Ludick
- (Russia) German Davydov (c)
- (Russia) Vlad Sozonov
- (South Africa) Franco Naude

Full backs

- (Russia) Roman Roshin
- (Namibia) Johann Tromp
