= Kiseleff Cup =

The Kiseleff Cup was contested between the rugby union teams of Romania (The Oaks) and Russia (The Bears). The cup was named after the Count Pavel Kiselyov, a Russian who influenced the first ever constitutions in both Wallachia and Moldavia, now Romania and Moldova.

The Kiselyov Cup was contested each time Romania and Russia meet in a senior international match other than World Cup matches. The holder retains the cup unless the challenger wins the match in normal time.

== History ==
The Romanian Rugby Federation and the Rugby Union of Russia wanted to establish a similar cup like the Antim Cup that would be played annually between Romania and Russia and would have started just before the beginning of the new year in 2020, but those plans had to be pushed back to the Coronavirus.

It was decided that the cup should be named after Pavel Kiselyov (Romania: Pavel Kiseleff) (Russian: Па́вел Киселёв/Pavel Kiselev) (c. 1788–1872) a Russian Count that was well integrated in Romanian history.

== Results ==
Year	Date	Home	Score	Away	Cup Holder (Note: In the event of a draw, the previous winner retains the trophy.)	Venue
2021	6 March	Russia	18–13	Romania	Russia	Fisht Olympic Stadium, Sochi
2022	5 February	Romania	34–25	Russia	Romania	Arcul de Triumf Stadium, Bucharest
Not played since 2023 due Russia suspension from Rugby Europe and World Rugby. (Note: Russia was suspended from Rugby Europe and World Rugby due to Russian invasion of Ukraine.)

== Summary ==
Details	Played	Won by Romania	Won by Russia	Drawn	Romania points	Russia points
In Romania	1	1	0	0	34	25
In Russia	1	0	1	0	13	18
Overall	2	1	1	0	47	43

== Honours ==
- Romania (1): 2022
- Russia (1): 2021

== See also ==
Antim Cup
