= Irakli Tskhadadze =

- Born: August 1, 1996 (age 30) Tbilisi, Georgia
- Height: 1.92 m (6 ft 3 1/2 in)
- Weight: 105 kg (16 st 7 lb)

Rugby union career
- Position: Flanker
Senior career
| Years | Team | Apps | (Points) |
| 2016-2018 | Bordeaux | | |
| 2018-2021 | Brive | 5 | (0) |
| 2021- | Soyaux Angoulême XV | | |
International career
| Years | Team | Apps | (Points) |
| 2015-2016 | Georgia U20 | 7 | (5) |
| 2020- | Georgia | 5 | (0) |
- Correct as of 13:09, 20 July 2021 (UTC)

Irakli Tskhadadze (Georgian: ირაკლი ცხადაძე) is a Georgian rugby union player and member of the Georgian national rugby team.

He played as Flanker for Bordeaux and Brive in the Top 14.

Irakli currently plays for Soyaux Angoulême XV.
