= José Lima (rugby union) =

Portuguese rugby union player

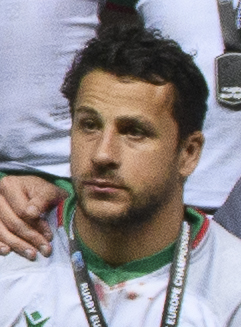
- Born: 24 April 1992 (age 34)
- Height: 185 cm (6 ft 1 in)
- Weight: 100 kg (220 lb; 15 st 10 lb)

Rugby union career
- Position: Centre
International career
Years	Team	Apps	(Points)
2010–	Portugal	58	(66)

José Gonçalo Ataíde Amaral Pedroso de Lima, better known as José Lima (born Coimbra, 24 April 1992), is a Portuguese rugby union player. He plays as a centre or as a wing.

== Club career ==
Lima first played for CR Évora, moving afterwards to AEIS Agronomia, in Portugal, from 2010/11 to 2011/12. He was assigned to RC Narbonne, in the French Pro D2, when he was 20 years old, where he played from 2012/13 to 2013/14. He missed narrowly the promotion to the Top 14 at the final of the 2013/14 season. He moved to US Carcassonne for the next two seasons, 2014/15 to 2015/16, also at the Pro D2. He next played for US Oyonnax (2016/17-2017/18), once again for RC Narbonne (2017/18), moving for US Carcassonne in 2018/19, where he has been playing since then, still at the Pro D2. He was suspended for doping for one year in January 2019, returning to competition in January 2020.

== International career ==
He has 58 caps for Portugal, since his debut in 2010, aged only 18 years old, with 11 tries, 1 conversion and 3 penalties scored, 36 points on aggregate. His first game was at the 17–22 loss to the United States, at 13 November 2010, in Lisbon. He has been a regular player for the national team since then.
