= 2024–25 Didi 10 season =

Rugby union competition in Georgia

2024–25 Didi 10
- Countries: (Georgia (country)) Georgia
- Number of teams: 10
- Date: 6 September 2024 – 18 May 2025

Official website
- stat.rugby.ge

The 2024–25 Crocobet Didi 10 is the 35th season of the top flight of Georgian domestic rugby union.

== Teams ==
The competition features 10 teams, the reigning champions entering the season were RC Aia Kutaisi, who claimed their 9th league title after winning the 2023 final. Tao Samtskhe-Javakheti and RC Army Tbilisi were promoted from the 2023–24 Georgian First League, replacing RC Academy Tbilisi and Artsivebi Eagles.

=== Stadiums and locations ===
Locations of the 2024-25 Didi 10 teams.

Club	Head Coach	Captain	Stadium	Capacity	City/Area
Aia Kutaisi	(Georgia (country)) Giorgi Nemsadze	(Georgia (country)) Giorgi Babunashvili	Aia Arena	4 860	Kutaisi
Ares Kutaisi	(Georgia (country)) Sergo Freudze		Aia Arena	4 860	Kutaisi
Army Tbilisi		(Georgia (country)) Sandro Nakhutsrishvili	Avchala Stadium	2 500	Tbilisi
Batumi	(Georgia (country)) Irakli Ninidze	(Georgia (country)) Beka Urjukashvili	Batumi Rugby Stadium	1 500	Batumi
Kazbegi	(Georgia (country)) Gocha Chkareuli	(Georgia (country)) Gugua Khulelidze	RC Kazbegi Rugby Stadium	0	Stephantsminda
Khvamli Tbilisi	(Georgia (country)) Davit Tshvediani		Mukhiani Arena	1 500	Tbilisi
Kochebi Bolnisi	(Georgia (country)) Viktor Didebulidze		Tamaz Stepania Stadium	3 000	Bolnisi
Lelo Saracens	(Georgia (country)) Tornike Bubuteishvili	(Georgia (country)) Sandro Koiava	Lelo Arena	3 000	Tbilisi
Rustavi Kharebi	(Georgia (country)) Irakli Natriashvili	(Georgia (country)) Mikheil Tsiklauri	Kharebi Arena	3 000	Rustavi
Tao Samtskhe-Javakheti		(Georgia (country)) Beka Arveladze	Aspindza Field	1 500	Aspindza

== Table ==
2024–25 Didi 10 table
Pos	Team	Pld	W	D	L	PF	PA	PD	TB	LB	Pts	Qualification
1	Aia Kutaisi	3	3	0	0	71	35	+36	1	0	13	For elimination finals
2	Ares Kutaisi	3	2	0	1	108	78	+30	1	1	10	For elimination finals
3	Army Tbilisi	3	2	0	1	70	58	+12	1	1	10	For third time finals
4	Khvamli Tbilisi	3	2	0	1	84	73	+11	2	0	10	For third time finals
5	Kazbegi	3	2	0	1	64	55	+9	0	1	9	For third time finals
6	Rustavi Kharebi	3	2	0	1	75	70	+5	0	1	9	For third time finals
7	Batumi	3	1	0	2	50	65	-15	0	1	5	
8	Tao Samtskhe-Javakheti	3	1	0	2	44	79	-35	0	0	4	
9	Lelo Saracens	3	0	0	3	45	62	-17	0	3	3	Play-off with 2024–25 Georgian First League runner-up
10	Kochebi Bolnisi	3	0	0	3	43	79	-36	0	1	1	Relegation to Georgian First League

As of 16 September 2024

== Regular season ==
The regular season was played over 18 rounds, with each round consisting of five matches. Beginning on the 6 September 2024 and finishing on the 15 March 2025. The top six teams in the rankings qualified for the playoffs. The final placed team is relegated with the 9th placed side qualifying for play-off with 2024–25 Georgian First League runner-up.

=== Round 1 ===
6 September 2024

Army Tbilisi	8 – 11	Aia Kutaisi
Try: L. Keshelava 51' m Pen: K. Iashvili 65' (1/1)	Report	Try: T. Mbola 15' m Pen: G. Babunashvili 4', 45' (2/4)

Avchala Stadium, Tbilisi

7 September 2024

Tao Samtskhe-Javakheti	15 – 10	Lelo Saracens
Pen: O. Talakhadze 20', 24', 51', 60', 84' (5/5)	Report	Try: G. Spanderashvili 39' c Con: P. Khutsishvili 39' (1/1); Pen: P. Khutsishvili 22' (1/1)

Aspindza Rugby Field, Samtskhe–Javakheti

7 September 2024

Khvamli Tbilisi	21 – 3	RC Batumi
Try: M. Takaishvili 10' c T. Baikhoidze 46' c S. Inalishvili 66' c Con: N. Tsintsadze 11', 47', 68' (3/3)	Report	Pen: V. Mikadze 18' (1/1)

Khvamli Arena, Tbilisi

8 September 2024

RC Kazbegi	30 – 19	Kochebi Bolnisi
Try: M. Akhobadze 11' c L. Kushashvili 33' c D. Imnadze 63 c Con: D. Imnadze 12', 33' (2/2); D. Modzgvrishvili 64' (1/1); Pen: D. Imnadze 15', 30', 63'	Report	Try: Z. Zhorzholadze 40' m, 45' c L. Gogolashvili 53' c Con: S. Matiashvili 46', 53' (2/3)

Avchala Stadium, Tbilisi

8 September 2024

Rustavi Kharebi	24 – 31	Ares Kutaisi
Try: M. Rocondino 5' c T. Usenashvili 8' c T. Chamiashvili 77' c Con: S. Margiani 7', 9' (2/2); G. Petriashvili 78' (1/1); Pen: S. Margiani 55' (1/1)	Report	Try: P. Finau 20' c Z. Tskiporishvili 52' c J. Ndrava 63' c, 70' m G. Kobakhidze 82' m Con: G. Tedoradze 21', 53', 64' (3/5)

Kharebi Arena, Rustavi

=== Round 2 ===
13 September 2024

Army Tbilisi	29 – 28	RC Batumi
Try: M. Ninidze 53' c Penalty try 78'; Con: M. Ninidze 54'; Pen: M. Peters 7', 17', 21'; M. Ninidze 66'; Drop: M. Ninidze 38'	Report	Try: V. Tagauri 44' m, 46' m L. Popkhadze 59' m V. Putkaradze 74' c Con: S. Chkhaidze 75'; Pen: V. Ninidze 3', 12'

Avchala Stadium, Tbilisi

14 September 2024

Aia Kutaisi	36 – 10	Tao Samtskhe-Javakheti
Try: O. Metreveli 7' m Z. Khutsidze 29' c S. Khonelidze 39' c G. Freudze 59' c E. Makhareishvili 77' c Con: G. Babunashvili 30', 40', 60'; E. Makhareishvili 78'; Pen: G. Babunashvili 35'	Report	Try: O. Metreveli 41' m G. Shkinin 67' m

Aia Arena, Kutaisi

14 September 2024

Ares Kutaisi	62 – 35	Khvamli Tbilisi
Try: Z. Tskipurishvili 20' c Z. Dzneladze 25' c N. Dzneladze 36' c A. Machaladze 47' c I. Tevadze 50' c G. Kobakhidze 55' c, 74' m, 78' m Con: G. Tedoradze 12', 20', 26', 36', 47', 51', 56'; Pen: G. Tedoradze 63'	Report	Try: N. Tsintsadze 2' c J. Mbaleleivuka 5' c F. Tsiklauri 8' c S. Inalishvili 16' c Z. Lutidze 66' c Con: N. Tsintsadze 3', 5', 9', 17', 66'

Aia Arena, Kutaisi

15 September 2024

Kochebi Bolnisi	16 – 21	Rustavi Kharebi
Try: R. Pkhaladze 54' m I. Gegenava 66' m Pen: S. Matiashvili 43', 86'	Report	Try: A. Zasadze 35' c R. Sainivalat 48' m Con: S. Margiani 36'; Pen: S. Margiani 3', 38', 40'

Rugby Plateau, Bolnisi

15 September 2024

Lelo Saracens	12 – 17	RC Kazbegi
Pen: L. Mengashvili 12', 27', 36', 43'	Report	Try: G. Margalitadze 15' c, 77' c Con: D. Imnadze 16'; D. Modzgvrishvili 78'; Pen: D. Imnadze 10'

Lelo Arena, Tbilisi

=== Round 3 ===
20 September 2024

RC Batumi	19 – 15	Ares Kutaisi
	Report

Batumi Stadium

21 September 2024

Tao Samtskhe-Javakheti	19 – 33	Army Tbilisi
	Report

Aspindza Rugby Field, Samtskhe–Javakheti

21 September 2024

Khvamli Tbilisi	28 – 8	Kochebi Bolnisi
	Report

Khvamli Arena, Tbilisi

22 September 2024

Rustavi Kharebi	30 – 23	Lelo Saracens

Kharebi Arena, Rustavi

22 September 2024

RC Kazbegi	17 – 24	Aia Kutaisi

Avchala Stadium, Tbilisi

=== Round 4 ===
4 October 2024

Lelo Saracens	–	Khvamli Tbilisi

Lelo Arena, Tbilisi

5 October 2024

Army Tbilisi	–	Ares Kutaisi

Avchala Stadium, Tbilisi

5 October 2024

Kochebi Bolnisi	–	RC Batumi

Rugby Plateau, Bolnisi

6 October 2024

Tao Samtskhe-Javakheti	–	RC Kazbegi

Aspindza Rugby Field, Samtskhe–Javakheti

6 October 2024

Aia Kutaisi	–	Rustavi Kharebi

Aia Arena, Kutaisi

=== Round 5 ===
11 October 2024

Ares Kutaisi	–	Kochebi Bolnisi

Aia Arena, Kutaisi

11 October 2024

RC Batumi	–	Lelo Saracens

Batumi Stadium

12 October 2024

RC Kazbegi	–	Army Tbilisi

TBC

13 October 2024

Tao Samtskhe-Javakheti	–	Rustavi Kharebi

Aspindza Rugby Field, Samtskhe–Javakheti

13 October 2024

Khvamli Tbilisi	–	Aia Kutaisi

Khvamli Arena, Tbilisi

=== Round 6 ===
18 October 2024

Lelo Saracens	–	Ares Kutaisi

Lelo Arena, Tbilisi

19 October 2024

Tao Samtskhe-Javakheti	–	Khvamli Tbilisi

Aspindza Rugby Field, Samtskhe–Javakheti

19 October 2024

Army Tbilisi	–	Kochebi Bolnisi

Avchala Stadium, Tbilisi

20 October 2024

Aia Kutaisi	–	RC Batumi

Aia Arena, Kutaisi

20 October 2024

RC Kazbegi	–	Rustavi Kharebi

Avchala Stadium, Tbilisi

=== Round 7 ===
1/2/3 November 2024

Rustavi Kharebi	–	Army Tbilisi

1/2/3 November 2024

Kochebi Bolnisi	–	Lelo Saracens

1/2/3 November 2024

Ares Kutaisi	–	Aia Kutaisi

1/2/3 November 2024

RC Batumi	–	Tao Samtskhe-Javakheti

1/2/3 November 2024

Khvamli Tbilisi	–	RC Kazbegi

=== Round 8 ===
8/9/10 November 2024

Army Tbilisi	–	Lelo Saracens

8/9/10 November 2024

Aia Kutaisi	–	Kochebi Bolnisi

8/9/10 November 2024

Tao Samtskhe-Javakheti	–	Ares Kutaisi

8/9/10 November 2024

RC Kazbegi	–	RC Batumi

8/9/10 November 2024

Rustavi Kharebi	–	Khvamli Tbilisi

=== Round 9 ===
15/16/17 November 2024

Khvamli Tbilisi	–	Army Tbilisi

15/16/17 November 2024

Lelo Saracens	–	Aia Kutaisi

15/16/17 November 2024

Kochebi Bolnisi	–	Tao Samtskhe-Javakheti

15/16/17 November 2024

Ares Kutaisi	–	RC Kazbegi

15/16/17 November 2024

RC Batumi	–	Rustavi Kharebi

=== Round 10 ===
29/30/1 November/December 2024

Aia Kutaisi	–	Army Tbilisi

29/30/1 November/December 2024

Lelo Saracens	–	Tao Samtskhe-Javakheti

29/30/1 November/December 2024

Kochebi Bolnisi	–	RC Kazbegi

29/30/1 November/December 2024

Ares Kutaisi	–	Rustavi Kharebi

29/30/1 November/December 2024

RC Batumi	–	Khvamli Tbilisi

=== Round 11 ===
13/14/15 December 2024

RC Batumi	–	Army Tbilisi

13/14/15 December 2024

Khvamli Tbilisi	–	Ares Kutaisi

13/14/15 December 2024

Rustavi Kharebi	–	Kochebi Bolnisi

13/14/15 December 2024

RC Kazbegi	–	Lelo Saracens

13/14/15 December 2024

Tao Samtskhe-Javakheti	–	Aia Kutaisi

=== Round 12 ===
20/21/22 December 2024

Army Tbilisi	–	Tao Samtskhe-Javakheti

20/21/22 December 2024

Ares Kutaisi	–	RC Batumi

20/21/22 December 2024

Kochebi Bolnisi	–	Khvamli Tbilisi

20/21/22 December 2024

Lelo Saracens	–	Rustavi Kharebi

20/21/22 December 2024

Aia Kutaisi	–	RC Kazbegi

=== Round 13 ===
7/8/9 February 2025

Ares Kutaisi	–	Army Tbilisi

7/8/9 February 2025

RC Batumi	–	Kochebi Bolnisi

7/8/9 February 2025

Khvamli Tbilisi	–	Lelo Saracens

7/8/9 February 2025

Rustavi Kharebi	–	Aia Kutaisi

7/8/9 February 2025

RC Kazbegi	–	Tao Samtskhe-Javakheti

=== Round 14 ===
14/15/16 February 2025

Army Tbilisi	–	RC Kazbegi

14/15/16 February 2025

Kochebi Bolnisi	–	Ares Kutaisi

14/15/16 February 2025

Lelo Saracens	–	RC Batumi

14/15/16 February 2025

Aia Kutaisi	–	Khvamli Tbilisi

14/15/16 February 2025

Rustavi Kharebi	–	Tao Samtskhe-Javakheti

=== Round 15 ===
21/22/23 February 2025

Kochebi Bolnisi	–	Army Tbilisi

21/22/23 February 2025

Ares Kutaisi	–	Lelo Saracens

21/22/23 February 2025

RC Batumi	–	Aia Kutaisi

21/22/23 February 2025

Khvamli Tbilisi	–	Tao Samtskhe-Javakheti

21/22/23 February 2025

Rustavi Kharebi	–	RC Kazbegi

=== Round 16 ===
TBC

Army Tbilisi	–	Rustavi Kharebi

TBC

Lelo Saracens	–	Kochebi Bolnisi

TBC

Aia Kutaisi	–	Ares Kutaisi

TBC

Tao Samtskhe-Javakheti	–	RC Batumi

TBC

RC Kazbegi	–	Khvamli Tbilisi

=== Round 17 ===
TBC

Lelo Saracens	–	Army Tbilisi

TBC

Kochebi Bolnisi	–	Aia Kutaisi

TBC

Ares Kutaisi	–	Tao Samtskhe-Javakheti

TBC

RC Batumi	–	RC Kazbegi

TBC

Khvamli Tbilisi	–	Rustavi Kharebi

=== Round 18 ===
TBC

Army Tbilisi	–	Khvamli Tbilisi

TBC

Aia Kutaisi	–	Lelo Saracens

TBC

Tao Samtskhe-Javakheti	–	Kochebi Bolnisi

TBC

RC Kazbegi	–	Ares Kutaisi

TBC

Rustavi Kharebi	–	RC Batumi

== Play-offs ==
The top 6 ranked team at the end of the regular season qualified for the play-offs, teams ranked 3rd to 6th played against each other in the Third Time finals. The winniners of the third time final play off in the Qualifying final, with the teams ranked 1st and 2nd playing off against each other, the winner of that game qualifying for the final, the loser having another chance to reach the final playing the Qualifying final winner in the Preliminary final.

Third time finals
3rd place	00
6th place	00
4th place	00
5th place	00
1st place
2nd place

Qualifying and elimination finals
Third time final 1 winner	00
Third time final 2 winner	00
1st place	00
2nd place	00

Preliminary final
Qualifying final loser	00
Elimination final winner	00
Qualifying final winner

Final
Qualifying final winner	00
Preliminary final winner	00

=== Third time finals ===
TBC

3rd place	–	6th place

TBC

4th place	–	5th place

=== Qualifying and elimination finals ===
TBC

1st place	–	2nd place

TBC

Third time final 1 winner	–	Third time final 2 winner

=== Preliminary final ===
TBC

Qualifying final loser	–	Elimination final winner

== Final ==
TBC

Qualifying final winner	–	Preliminary final winner

== Promotion/relegation play-off ==
The team that finished bottom of the table are to be replaced by the winners of the 2024–25 Georgian First League. Runners-up of Georgian First League, played a 2-match home/away confrontation against 9th place.

30/31/1 May/June 2025

9th place	–	Georgian First League runners-up

6/7/8 June 2025

Georgian First League runners-up	–	9th place

== Rules ==
The clubs can have an unlimited number of foreigners in their overall squad, however are only allowed to have no more than three foreigners in a match day 23.

All teams, excluding the two newly promoted sides Tao Samtskhe-Javakheti and RC Army Tbilisi, are required to use GPS systems to improve the level of domestic championships and the quality of games.

== See also ==
- 2024–25 European Rugby Champions Cup
- 2024–25 EPCR Challenge Cup
- 2023–24 Premiership Rugby
- 2024–25 Premiership Rugby Cup
- 2024–25 RFU Championship
- 2024–25 United Rugby Championship
- 2024–25 Top 14 season
- 2024–25 Rugby Pro D2 season
- 2025 Major League Rugby season
- 2025 Super Rugby Pacific season
