= 2023–24 Didi 10 season =

Rugby union competition in Georgia

2023–24 Didi 10
- Countries: (Georgia (country)) Georgia
- Number of teams: 10
- Date: 8 September 2023 – 19 May 2024
- Champions: RC Aia Kutaisi
- Runners-up: Lelo Saracens
- Relegated: RC Academy Tbilisi; Artsivebi Eagles
- Top point scorer: (Georgia (country)) Nika Tsintsadze (Khvamli Tbilisi) – 188 points
- Top try scorer: (Georgia (country)) Amiran Shvangiradze (RC Aia Kutaisi) – 20 tries

Official website
- stat.rugby.ge

The 2023–24 Didi 10 is the 34th season of the top flight of Georgian domestic rugby union competition. RC Aia Kutaisi were champions after beating Lelo Saracens in the final.

== Teams ==
The competition featured 10 teams, the reigning champions entering the season were RC Rustavi Kharebi, who claimed their 1st league title after winning the 2023 final. Artsivebi Eagles was promoted from the 2022–23 Georgian First League, replacing RC Locomotive Tbilisi.

=== Stadiums and locations ===
Locations of the 2023-24 Didi 10 teams.

Club	Head Coach	Captain	Stadium	Capacity	City/Area
Ares Kutaisi	(Georgia (country)) Sergo Freudze		Aia Arena	4,860	Kutaisi
Artsivebi Eagles	(Georgia (country)) Gia Amirkhanashvili	(Georgia (country)) Zurab Zhorzholadze	Zvani Stadium	3,500	Ozurgeti
Kazbegi	(Georgia (country)) Gocha Chkareuli				Kazbegi
Khvamli Tbilisi	(Georgia (country)) Davit Tshvediani		Khvamli Arena		Tbilisi
Lelo Saracens	(Georgia (country)) Tornike Bubuteishvili	(Georgia (country)) Sandro Koiava	Lelo Arena	3,000	Tbilisi
RC Academy Tbilisi	(Georgia (country)) Levan Datunashvili		Nutsubidze Rugby Stadium	2,000	Tbilisi
RC Aia Kutaisi	(Georgia (country)) Levan Sharvashidze	(Georgia (country)) Petre Jincharadze	Aia Arena	4,860	Kutaisi
RC Batumi	(Georgia (country)) Irakli Ninidze		Batumi Stadium	1,500	Batumi
RC Kochebi Bolnisi	(Georgia (country)) Viktor Didebulidze				Bolnisi
RC Rustavi Kharebi	(Georgia (country)) Irakli Natriashvili		Kharebi Arena		Rustavi

== Table ==
2023–24 Didi 10 Table
Pos	Team	Pld	W	D	L	PF	PA	PD	TB	LB	Pts	Qualification
1	Lelo Saracens (RU)	18	16	1	1	631	307	+324	5	0	71	For Elimination finals
2	RC Aia Kutaisi (C)	18	12	0	6	647	392	+255	8	3	59	For Elimination finals
3	RC Batumi	18	11	0	7	526	284	+284	5	4	53	For Third time finals
4	Ares Kutaisi	18	11	0	7	561	394	+167	3	5	52	For Third time finals
5	Khvamli Tbilisi	18	10	1	7	659	342	+317	6	3	51	For Third time finals
6	RC Kochebi Bolnisi (3rd)	18	10	0	8	415	416	-1	4	2	46	For Third time finals
7	RC Rustavi Kharebi	18	9	0	9	495	365	+130	4	3	44	
8	Kazbegi	18	6	1	11	474	407	+67	3	5	34	
9	Artsivebi Eagles	18	3	1	14	462	698	-236	2	2	18	Play-off with 2023–24 Georgian Georgian First League runner-up
10	RC Academy Tbilisi	18	0	0	18	103	1368	-1265	0	0	0	Relegation to First League

== Regular season ==
The regular season was played over 18 rounds, with each round consisting of five matches. Beginning on the 8 September 2023 and finishing on the 24 March 2024. The top six teams in the rankings qualified for the playoffs. The final placed team is relegated with the 9th placed side qualifying for play-off with 2023–24 League 1 runner-up.

=== Round 1 ===
8 September 2023

Khvamli Tbilisi	13 – 25	Lelo Saracens
	Report

Kharebi Arena, Rustavi

8 September 2023

Artsivebi Eagles	3 – 24	RC Rustavi Kharebi
	Report

Zvani Stadium, Ozurgeti

9 September 2023

RC Academy Tbilisi	3 – 73	RC Batumi
	Report

Nutsubidze Rugby Stadium, Tbilisi

10 September 2023

Kazbegi	25 – 22	RC Aia Kutaisi
	Report

Kazbegi

10 September 2023

RC Kochebi Bolnisi	17 – 8	Ares Kutaisi
	Report

Bolnisi

=== Round 2 ===
15 September 2023

RC Batumi	23 – 27	Khvamli Tbilisi
	Report

Batumi Stadium, Batumi

16 September 2023

Artsivebi Eagles	21 – 46	RC Kochebi Bolnisi
	Report

Zvani Stadium, Ozurgeti

16 September 2023

Kazbegi	3 – 16	Lelo Saracens
	Report

Kazbegi

17 September 2023

RC Rustavi Kharebi	80 – 3	RC Academy Tbilisi
	Report

Kharebi Arena, Rustavi

17 September 2023

RC Aia Kutaisi	33 – 21	Ares Kutaisi
	Report

Aia Arena, Kutaisi

=== Round 3 ===
22 September 2023

Kazbegi	21 – 32	RC Batumi
	Report

Kazbegi

23 September 2023

RC Academy Tbilisi	13 – 75	Artsivebi Eagles
	Report

Nutsubidze Rugby Stadium, Tbilisi

23 September 2023

Khvamli Tbilisi	20 – 3	RC Rustavi Kharebi
	Report

Khvamli Arena, Tbilisi

24 September 2023

RC Kochebi Bolnisi	16 – 8	RC Aia Kutaisi
	Report

Bolnisi

24 September 2023

Ares Kutaisi	27 – 29	Lelo Saracens
	Report

Aia Arena, Kutaisi

=== Round 4 ===
6 October 2023

RC Rustavi Kharebi	24 – 17	Kazbegi
	Report

Kharebi Arena, Rustavi

6 October 2023

RC Kochebi Bolnisi	27 – 33	Lelo Saracens
	Report

Bolnisi

7 October 2023

RC Batumi	22 – 27	Ares Kutaisi
	Report

Batumi Stadium, Batumi

8 October 2023

Artsivebi Eagles	10 – 55	RC Aia Kutaisi
	Report

Zvani Stadium, Ozurgeti

8 October 2023

RC Academy Tbilisi	0 – 89	Khvamli Tbilisi
	Report

Nutsubidze Rugby Stadium, Tbilisi

=== Round 5 ===
13 October 2023

Ares Kutaisi	22 – 28	RC Rustavi Kharebi
	Report

Aia Arena, Kutaisi

14 October 2023

Khvamli Tbilisi	38 – 13	Artsivebi Eagles
	Report

Khvamli Arena, Tbilisi

14 October 2023

RC Aia Kutaisi	24 – 28	Lelo Saracens
	Report

Aia Arena, Kutaisi

15 October 2023

RC Kochebi Bolnisi	14 – 13	RC Batumi
	Report

Bolnisi

15 October 2023

Kazbegi	55 – 9	RC Academy Tbilisi
	Report

Kazbegi

=== Round 6 ===
20 October 2023

Artsivebi Eagles	23 – 35	Lelo Saracens
	Report

Zvani Stadium, Ozurgeti

21 October 2023

RC Batumi	13 – 20	RC Aia Kutaisi
	Report

Batumi Stadium, Batumi

21 October 2023

Khvamli Tbilisi	33 – 29	Kazbegi
	Report

Khvamli Arena, Tbilisi

22 October 2023

RC Academy Tbilisi	12 – 54	Ares Kutaisi
	Report

Nutsubidze Rugby Stadium, Tbilisi

22 October 2023

RC Rustavi Kharebi	12 – 20	RC Kochebi Bolnisi
	Report

Kharebi Arena, Rustavi

=== Round 7 ===
3 November 2023

Kazbegi	40 – 18	Artsivebi Eagles
	Report

Kazbegi

3 November 2023

Lelo Saracens	0 – 22	RC Batumi
	Report

Lelo Arena, Tbilisi

4 November 2023

Ares Kutaisi	23 – 13	Khvamli Tbilisi
	Report

Aia Arena, Kutaisi

5 November 2023

RC Aia Kutaisi	57 – 24	RC Rustavi Kharebi
	Report

Aia Arena, Kutaisi

5 November 2023

RC Academy Tbilisi	50 – 5	RC Kochebi Bolnisi
	Report

Nutsubidze Rugby Stadium, Tbilisi

=== Round 8 ===
17 November 2023

RC Aia Kutaisi	33 – 20	Khvamli Tbilisi
	Report

Aia Arena, Kutaisi

18 November 2023

RC Batumi	10 – 0	RC Rustavi Kharebi
	Report

Batumi Stadium, Batumi

18 November 2023

Lelo Saracens	93 – 0	RC Academy Tbilisi
	Report

Lelo Arena, Tbilisi

19 November 2023

Ares Kutaisi	47 – 46	Artsivebi Eagles
	Report

Aia Arena, Kutaisi

19 November 2023

RC Kochebi Bolnisi	17 – 36	Kazbegi
	Report

Bolnisi

=== Round 9 ===
24 November 2023

RC Academy Tbilisi	5 – 78	RC Aia Kutaisi
	Report

Nutsubidze Rugby Stadium, Tbilisi

25 November 2023

Kazbegi	14 – 22	Ares Kutaisi
	Report

Kazbegi

25 November 2023

Khvamli Tbilisi	21 – 10	RC Kochebi Bolnisi
	Report

Khvamli Arena, Tbilisi

26 November 2023

RC Rustavi Kharebi	14 – 22	Lelo Saracens
	Report

Lelo Arena, Tbilisi

26 November 2023

Artsivebi Eagles	21 – 33	RC Batumi
	Report

Zvani Stadium, Ozurgeti

=== Round 10 ===
1 December 2023

Ares Kutaisi	36 – 41	RC Kochebi Bolnisi
	Report

Aia Arena, Kutaisi

1 December 2023

RC Aia Kutaisi	15 – 6	Kazbegi
	Report

Aia Arena, Kutaisi

3 December 2023

RC Rustavi Kharebi	49 – 43	Artsivebi Eagles
	Report

Kharebi Arena, Rustavi

3 December 2023

RC Batumi	89 – 5	RC Academy Tbilisi
	Report

Batumi Stadium, Batumi

3 December 2023

Lelo Saracens	34 – 34	Khvamli Tbilisi
	Report

Lelo Arena, Tbilisi

=== Round 11 ===
8 December 2023

Ares Kutaisi	17 – 23	RC Aia Kutaisi
	Report

Aia Arena, Kutaisi

9 December 2023

RC Academy Tbilisi	45 – 6	RC Rustavi Kharebi
	Report

Nutsubidze Rugby Stadium, Tbilisi

10 December 2023

RC Kochebi Bolnisi	30 – 32	Artsivebi Eagles
	Report

Bolnisi

10 December 2023

Khvamli Tbilisi	17 – 44	RC Batumi
	Report

Khvamli Arena, Tbilisi

10 December 2023

Lelo Saracens	21 – 14	Kazbegi
	Report

Lelo Arena, Tbilisi

=== Round 12 ===
26 January 2024

RC Batumi	19 – 23	Kazbegi
	Report

Batumi Stadium, Batumi

27 January 2024

Artsivebi Eagles	69 – 10	RC Academy Tbilisi
	Report

Zvani Stadium, Ozurgeti

27 January 2024

RC Aia Kutaisi	47 – 7	RC Kochebi Bolnisi
	Report

Aia Arena, Kutaisi

28 January 2024

RC Rustavi Kharebi	14 – 7	Khvamli Tbilisi
	Report

Kharebi Arena, Rustavi

28 January 2024

Lelo Saracens	19 – 16	Ares Kutaisi
	Report

Lelo Arena, Tbilisi

=== Round 13 ===
2 February 2024

RC Aia Kutaisi	56 – 20	Artsivebi Eagles
	Report

Aia Arena, Kutaisi

3 February 2024

Ares Kutaisi	20 – 10	RC Batumi
	Report

Aia Arena, Kutaisi

3 February 2024

Khvamli Tbilisi	93 – 0	RC Academy Tbilisi
	Report

Khvamli Arena, Tbilisi

4 February 2024

Kazbegi	18 – 23	RC Rustavi Kharebi
	Report

Kazbegi

4 February 2024

Lelo Saracens	29 – 7	RC Kochebi Bolnisi
	Report

Lelo Arena, Tbilisi

=== Round 14 ===
9 February 2024

Artsivebi Eagles	10 – 41	Khvamli Tbilisi
	Report

Zvani Stadium, Ozurgeti

11 February 2024

RC Batumi	26 – 15	RC Kochebi Bolnisi
	Report

Batumi Stadium, Batumi

11 February 2024

RC Rustavi Kharebi	34 – 38	Ares Kutaisi
	Report

Kharebi Arena, Rustavi

12 February 2024

Lelo Saracens	23 – 19	RC Aia Kutaisi
	Report

Lelo Arena, Tbilisi

18 May 2024

RC Academy Tbilisi	12 – 91	Kazbegi
	Report

Nutsubidze Rugby Stadium, Tbilisi

=== Round 15 ===
23 February 2024

Lelo Saracens	84 – 17	Artsivebi Eagles
	Report

Lelo Arena, Tbilisi

24 February 2024

RC Aia Kutaisi	18 – 8	RC Batumi
	Report

Aia Arena, Kutaisi

24 February 2024

Kazbegi	22 – 40	Khvamli Tbilisi
	Report

Kazbegi

25 February 2024

Ares Kutaisi	99 – 0	RC Academy Tbilisi
	Report

Aia Arena, Kutaisi

25 February 2024

RC Kochebi Bolnisi	19 – 14	RC Rustavi Kharebi
	Report

Bolnisi

=== Round 16 ===
1 March 2024

RC Batumi	12 – 22	Lelo Saracens
	Report

Batumi Stadium, Batumi

1 March 2024

Artsivebi Eagles	19 – 19	Kazbegi
	Report

Zvani Stadium, Ozurgeti

2 March 2024

RC Academy Tbilisi	13 – 31	RC Kochebi Bolnisi
	Report

Nutsubidze Rugby Stadium, Tbilisi

3 March 2024

Khvamli Tbilisi	24 – 28	Ares Kutaisi
	Report

Khvamli Arena, Tbilisi

3 March 2024

RC Rustavi Kharebi	61 – 7	RC Aia Kutaisi
	Report

Kharebi Arena, Rustavi

=== Round 17 ===
8 March 2024

RC Batumi	49 – 17	Artsivebi Eagles
	Report

Batumi Stadium, Batumi

9 March 2024

Lelo Saracens	29 – 28	RC Rustavi Kharebi
	Report

Lelo Arena, Tbilisi

9 March 2024

RC Kochebi Bolnisi	10 – 45	Khvamli Tbilisi
	Report

Bolnisi

10 March 2024

Ares Kutaisi	27 – 24	Kazbegi
	Report

Aia Arena, Kutaisi

10 March 2024

RC Aia Kutaisi	115 – 0	RC Academy Tbilisi
	Report

Aia Arena, Kutaisi

=== Round 18 ===
23 March 2024

Khvamli Tbilisi	88 – 17	RC Aia Kutaisi
	Report

Khvamli Arena, Tbilisi

23 March 2024

RC Rustavi Kharebi	18 – 24	RC Batumi
	Report

Kharebi Arena, Rustavi

23 March 2024

Kazbegi	17 – 38	RC Kochebi Bolnisi
	Report

Kazbegi

23 March 2024

Artsivebi Eagles	5 – 29	Ares Kutaisi
	report

Zvani Stadium, Ozurgeti

24 March 2024

RC Academy Tbilisi	7 – 89	Lelo Saracens
	Report

Nutsubidze Rugby Stadium, Tbilisi

== Play-offs ==
The top 6 ranked team at the end of the regular season qualified for the play-offs, teams ranked 3rd to 6th played against each other in the Third Time finals. The winniners of the third time final play off in the Qualifying final, with the teams ranked 1st and 2nd playing off against each other, the winner of that game qualifying for the final, the loser having another chance to reach the final playing the Qualifying final winner in the Preliminary final.

Third time finals
Ares Kutaisi	27
Khvamli Tbilisi	25
RC Batumi	7
RC Kochebi Bolnisi	11
RC Aia Kutaisi
Lelo Saracens

Qualifying and elimination finals
Ares Kutaisi	17
RC Kochebi Bolnisi	32
Lelo Saracens	10
RC Aia Kutaisi	27

Preliminary final
Lelo Saracens	22
RC Kochebi Bolnisi	19
RC Aia Kutaisi

Final
Lelo Saracens	3
RC Aia Kutaisi	19

=== Third time finals ===
6 April 2024
14:00

RC Batumi	7 – 11	RC Kochebi Bolnisi
Con: Ninidze 36'	Report	Try: Makhatadze 14' m Pen: Malaghuradze 12' 27'

Batumi Stadium, Batumi

7 April 2024
14:00

Ares Kutaisi	27 – 25	Khvamli Tbilisi
Try: Tskhadadze 21' c, Yaxymaiwai 48' c, Kobakhidze 79' c Con: Abashidze 22' 49' 80'; Pen: Abashidze 37' 61'	Report	Try: Lutidze 4' c, Kurtanidze 9' m, Aragveli 57' c Con: Tsintsadze 5' 58'; Pen: Tsintsadze 39' 41'

Aia Arena, Kutaisi

=== Qualifying and elimination finals ===
13 April 2024
16:00

Lelo Saracens	10 – 27	RC Aia Kutaisi
Try: Chikovani 44' c Con: Kiasashvili 45'; Pen: Kiasashvili 22'	Report	Try: Freudze 2' c, Ndrava 13' c, Metreveli 66' c Con: G. Babunashvili 3' 14' 67'; Pen: G. Babunashvili 6' 38'

Lelo Arena, Tbilisi

14 April 2024
14:30

Ares Kutaisi	17 – 32	RC Kochebi Bolnisi
Try: Tskhadadze 56' m 50' m, Kashia; Con: Kveselava 51'	Report	Try: Makhatadze 3' c, Mikadze 25' c, Tavartkiladze 61' m, Gamkrelidze 78' c Con: Malaghuradze 4' 26' 79'; Pen: Malaghuradze 17' 38'

Aia Arena, Kutaisi

=== Preliminary final ===
21 April 2024
17:00

Lelo Saracens	22 – 19 (a.e.t.)	RC Kochebi Bolnisi
Try: Archvadze 37' m, Kenchadze 48' c, Chikovani 66' c Con: Kiasashvili 48' 67'; Pen: Mikadze 91'	Report	Try: Chichinadze 23' c, Marshania 62' m, Pkhaladze 71' c Con: Malaghuradze 24', Chichinadze 72'

Lelo Arena, Tbilisi

== Final ==
28 April 2024
15:00

Lelo Saracens	3 – 19	RC Aia Kutaisi
Pen: Kiasashvili 21'	Report	Try: Kimutsadze 27' m, Shvangiradze 76' m Pen: G. Babunashvili 9' 39' 62'

Avchala
Referee: Amashukeli

Team details

FB	15	(Georgia (country)) Irakli Kiasashvili
RW	14	(Georgia (country)) Saba Archvadze
OC	13	(Georgia (country)) Giorgi Chikovani
IC	12	(Georgia (country)) Beka Mamukashvili
LW	11	(Georgia (country)) Gaga Kevkhishvili
FH	10	(Georgia (country)) Luka Mengashvili
SH	9	(Georgia (country)) Giorgi Kurtanidze
N8	8	(Georgia (country)) Beka Koriauli
OF	7	(Georgia (country)) Beka Gelkhvidze
BF	6	(Georgia (country)) Zaur Kenchadze
RL	5	(Georgia (country)) Sandro Koiava (c)
LL	4	(Georgia (country)) Vasil Chekadze
TP	3	(Georgia (country)) Davit Lazviashvili
HK	2	(Georgia (country)) Nika Babunashvili
LP	1	(Georgia (country)) Nika Svimonishvili
Substitutions:
HK	16	(Georgia (country)) Giorgi Maisuradze
LP	17	(Georgia (country)) Zuriko Urtashvili
TP	18	(Georgia (country)) Giorgi Shamatava
	19	(Georgia (country)) Jaba Sikharulidze
	20	(Georgia (country)) Archil Abesadze
	21	(Georgia (country)) Sandro Jighauri
	22	(Georgia (country)) Rati Beraya
	23	(Georgia (country)) Vazha Mikadze
Coach:
(Georgia (country)) Tornike Bubuteishvili

FB	15	(Georgia (country)) Guja Makhareishvili
RW	14	(Georgia (country)) Amiran Shvangiradze
OC	13	(Georgia (country)) Giorgi Freudze
IC	12	(Georgia (country)) Irakli Simsive
LW	11	(Fiji) Josevani Ndrava
FH	10	(Georgia (country)) Giorgi Babunashvil
SH	9	(Georgia (country)) Nodar Dolidze
N8	8	(Georgia (country)) Shota Areshidze
OF	7	(Georgia (country)) Giorgi Sinauridze
BF	6	(Fiji) Jutambiau Mbatirernga
RL	5	(Georgia (country)) Sitheven Iambak
LL	4	(Georgia (country)) Giorgi Nikoladze
TP	3	(Georgia (country)) Giorgi Kimutsadze
HK	2	(Georgia (country)) Saba Khonelidze
LP	1	(Georgia (country)) Petre Jincharadze (c)
Substitutions:
HK	16	(Georgia (country)) Saba Eremeishvili
LP	17	(Georgia (country)) Ruslan Gigashvili
TP	18	(Georgia (country)) Aleko Gigashvili
	19	(Georgia (country)) Giorgi Gabriadze
	20	(Georgia (country)) Luka Chaava
	21	(Georgia (country)) Nika Ghlonti
	22	(Georgia (country)) Emzar Mindiashvili
	23	(Georgia (country)) Saba Sharvashidze
Coach:
(Georgia (country)) Levan Sharvashidze

Player of the Match: Nodar Dolidze
Touch judges: Saba Makharadze, Gela Lemonjava

== Promotion/relegation play-off ==
The team that finished bottom of the table, RC Academy Tbilisi, are to be replaced by the winners of the 2023–24 Georgian First League, Tao Samtskhe-Javakheti. Runners-up of Georgian First League, RC Army Tbilisi, played a 2-match home/away confrontation against 9th place Artsivebi Eagles. With an aggregate score of 30–45 RC Army Tbilisi were promoted to the 2024–25 Didi 10, and the Artsivebi Eagles were relegated to the 2024–25 Georgian First League.

11 May 2024
17:00

RC Army Tbilisi	22 – 24	Artsivebi Eagles
Try: Churadze 68' c Con: Peters 69'; Pen: Peters 14' 21' 26' 52' 79'	Report	Try: Bezhanidze 9' c, Mbaseisei 45' c, Ulengo 60' c Con: Fredericks 10' 46' 61'; Pen: Fredericks 17'

Referee: Goguadze

19 May 2024
16:00

Artsivebi Eagles	6 – 23	RC Army Tbilisi
Pen: Fredericks 3' 31'		Try: Tamanitoakula 37' c, Peters 62' c Con: Peters 38' 63'; Pen: Peters 7' 60' 70'

Zvani Stadium, Ozurgeti

== Leading scorers ==
Note: Flags to the left of player names indicate national team as has been defined under World Rugby eligibility rules, or primary nationality for players who have not yet earned international senior caps. Players may hold one or more non-WR nationalities.

=== Most points ===
As of 25 May 2024

Rank	Player	Club	Points
1	(Georgia (country)) Nika Tsintsadze	Khvamli Tbilisi	188
2	(Georgia (country)) Lasha Malaghuradze	RC Kochebi Bolnisi	154
3	(Georgia (country)) Giorgi Babunashvili	RC Aia Kutaisi	143
4	(Georgia (country)) Mamuka Ninidze	RC Batumi	132
5	(Georgia (country)) Giorgi Tevdoradze	Ares Kutaisi	119
6	(Georgia (country)) Davit Modashrishvili	Kazbegi	110
7	(Georgia (country)) Irakli Kiasashvili	Lelo Saracens	103
8	(Georgia (country)) Vazha Mikadze	Lelo Saracens	92
9	(Georgia (country)) Bondo Abashidze	Ares Kutaisi	89
10	(South Africa) Marvin Fredericks	Artsivebi Eagles	74

=== Most tries ===
As of 25 May 2024

Rank	Player	Club	Tries
1	(Georgia (country)) Amiran Shvangiradze	RC Aia Kutaisi	20
2	(Georgia (country)) Englen Takoutin	Ares Kutaisi	17
3	(Fiji) Josevani Ndrava	RC Aia Kutaisi	14
4	(Georgia (country)) Jabulan Mkulvani	Artsivebi Eagles	12
5	(Georgia (country)) Saba Inalishvili	Khvamli Tbilisi	10
6	(Georgia (country)) Shalva Aftsiauri	Lelo Saracens	9
7	(Georgia (country)) Giorgi Kurtanidze	Khvamli Tbilisi	9
8	(Georgia (country)) Saba Kurtanidze	Khvamli Tbilisi	9
9	(Georgia (country)) Otar Metreveli	RC Aia Kutaisi	9
10	(Georgia (country)) Gaga Kevkhishvili	Lelo Saracens	9

== Attendances ==
#	Rugby union club	Average attendance
1	RC Batumi	611
2	Lelo Saracens	317
3	RC Aia Kutaisi	294
4	RC Rustavi Kharebi	275
5	Ares Kutaisi	270
6	Khvamli Tbilisi	250
7	RC Kazbegi	215
8	Artsivebi Eagles	158
9	RC Academy Tbilisi	132
10	RC Kochebi Bolnisi	107

== See also ==
- 2023–24 European Rugby Champions Cup
- 2023–24 EPCR Challenge Cup
- 2023–24 Premiership Rugby
- 2023–24 Premiership Rugby Cup
- 2023–24 RFU Championship
- 2023–24 United Rugby Championship
- 2023–24 Top 14 season
- 2023–24 Rugby Pro D2 season
- 2024 Major League Rugby season
- 2024 Super Rugby Pacific season
