= 2017–18 Didi 10 season =

2017–18 Didi 10
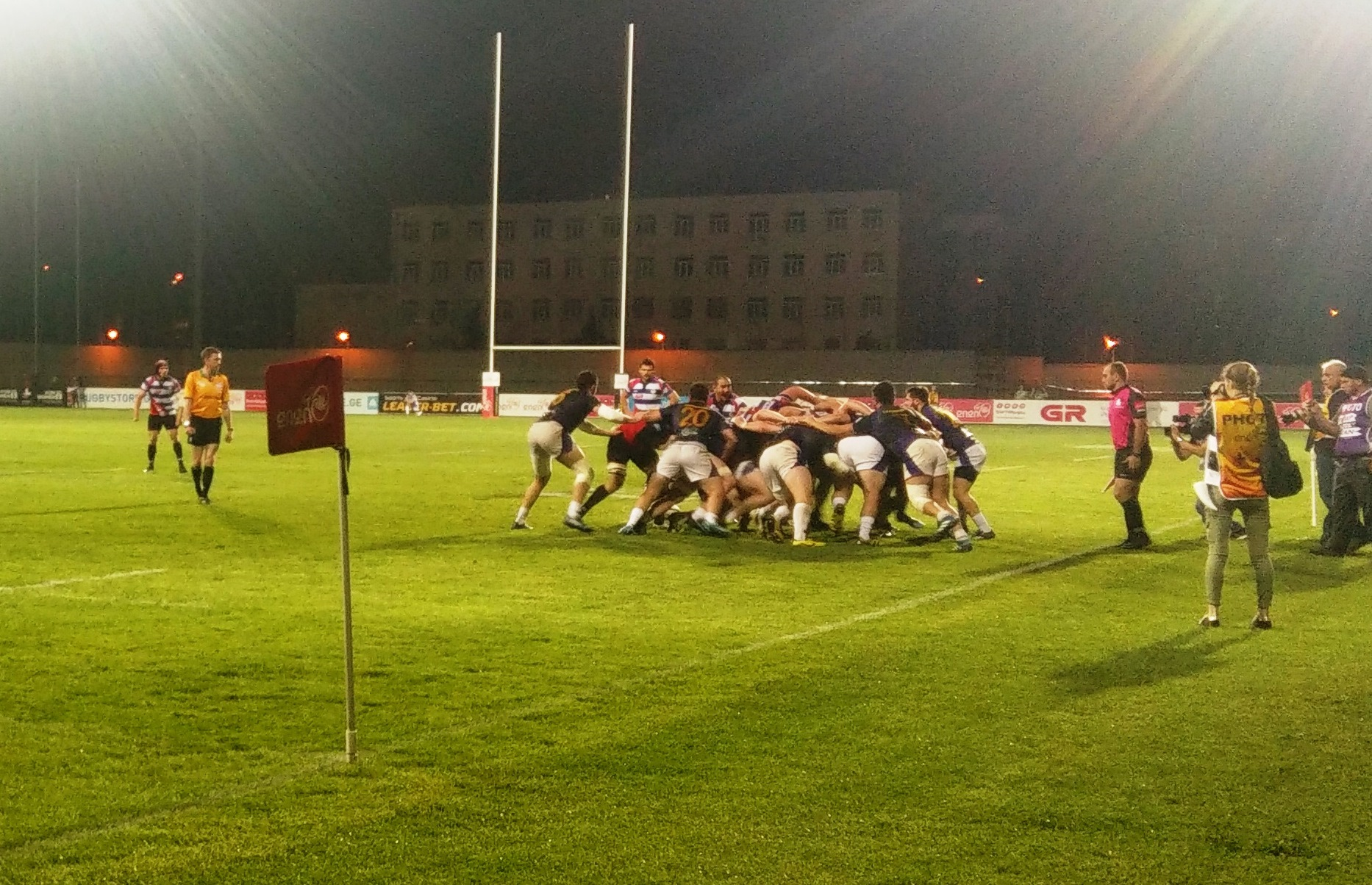
- Countries: Georgia
- Date: 1 September 2017 – 13 May 2018
- Champions: Locomotive
- Runners-up: Aia
- Matches played: 180
- Top point scorer: Mamuka Ninidze (161)
- Top try scorer: Giorgi Shkinin (23t)

Official website
- site.rugby.ge

The 2017–18 Didi 10 competition is Georgian domestic rugby union competition operated by Georgian Rugby Union. One new team from I league was promoted to Didi 10 (Rustavi Kharebi).

== Teams ==
Locations of the 2016-17 Didi 10 teams.
- Lelo: Official site
- Aia: Official site
- Locomotive
- Kharebi
- Armazi
- Army
- Jiki
- Bagrati
- Batumi
- Academy

== Table ==
2017–18 Didi 10 table
Pos	Team	Pld	W	D	L	PF	PA	PD	TF	TA	B	Pts	Qualification
1	Locomotive	18	15	0	3	535	297	+238	82	39	10	70	Play-off place 2018–19 European Rugby Continental Shield
2	Aia Kutaisi	18	16	0	2	544	248	+296	70	32	6	70	Play-off place 2018–19 European Rugby Continental Shield
3	Jiki	18	11	1	6	406	244	+162	53	25	12	58	Didi 10 finals
4	Batumi RC	18	12	1	5	405	273	+132	53	31	8	58	Didi 10 finals
5	Lelo Saracens	18	10	0	8	414	366	+48	50	46	7	47	Didi 10 finals
6	Rustavi Kharebi	18	9	1	8	384	385	−1	55	51	6	44	Didi 10 finals
7	Academy	18	5	0	13	294	276	+18	28	34	13	33	
8	Armazi	18	6	1	11	276	363	−87	36	47	6	32	
9	RC Army	18	3	0	15	288	641	−353	37	87	3	15	
10	Bagrati	18	1	0	17	169	622	−453	18	90	1	5	Relegated

Rules for classification: If teams are level at any stage, tiebreakers are applied in the following order:
1. Match results, between tied teams
2. Difference of points for and against, between tied teams
3. Tries For and Against, between tied teams
4. Total points scored for and against
5. Total tries scored for and against
6. Red cards
7. Yellow cards

== Playoffs ==
Quarterfinals
3	Jiki Gori	36
6	Kharebi	27
4	Batumi RC	30
5	Lelo Saracens	8

Semifinals
1	Aia Kutaisi	20
Locomotive	15
3	Jiki Gori	25
4	Batumi RC	19

Final
1	Aia Kutaisi	10
2	Locomotive	29
