= Luka Matkava =

Georgian rugby union player (born 2001)

- Full name: Luka Matkava
- Born: 10 May 2001 (age 25) Tbilisi, Georgia
- Height: 1.78 m (5 ft 10 in)
- Weight: 85 kg (187 lb; 13 st 5 lb)

Rugby union career
- Position(s): Scrum-half, Fly-half, Fullback
- Current team: Oyonnax
Youth career
- –2019: Armazi
Senior career
Years	Team	Apps	(Points)
2019–2021	Armazi	25	(61)
2021–2025	Black Lion	39	(307)
2021–2022	→ Junkers (loan)	6	(37)
2022–2023	→ Khvamli Tbilisi (loan)	1	(0)
2023–2024	→ Batumi (loan)	0	(0)
2024–2025	→ Kochebi Bolnisi (loan)	0	(0)
2025	→ Castres (loan)	1	(6)
2025–	Oyonnax	15	(105)
- Correct as of 12 October 2026
International career
Years	Team	Apps	(Points)
2019	Georgia U18	3	(15)
2019	Georgia U19	2	(0)
2022–	Georgia	40	(306)
- Correct as of 12 October 2026

Luka Matkava (Georgian: ლუკა მატკავა; born 10 May 2001) is a Georgian professional rugby union player who plays as a fly-half for Pro D2 club Oyonnax, and the Georgia national team.

== Club career ==
=== Armazi ===
Matkava began his career at RC Armazi in the Georgian Didi 10, scoring 62 points in 25 appearances. After Armazi were relegated in the 2020–21 season he joined Black Lion and RC Junkers.

=== Black Lion ===
In 2021 he was named in the initial Black Lion squad for the inaugural Rugby Europe Super Cup season. Making his debut off the bench against Tel Aviv Heat in the second round. He became a pivotal cog in the Georgian franchise featuring in all of the Black Lions matches for the 2022 season, including starting in the final against Tel Aviv Heat.

He started in Black Lions' EPCR Challenge Cup debut against Gloucester, scoring all of the Georgian franchises points in the 10–15 loss in Tbilisi, including scoring the only try of the game in the 20th minute. He started again the week after against Scarlets, scoring 13 points off the tee to help lead Black Lion secure their first ever EPCR Challenge Cup win "humiliating" the Llanelli based side. He started in Black Lions third Rugby Europe Super Cup final in 2023, scoring 2 penalties and 3 conversions not missing a kick off the tee.

=== Junkers ===
He joined RC Junkers in the Didi 10. He made his debut in the 7th round in a 35–29 win over Ares Kutaisi, scoring 15 points in the Junkers 2nd win of the season. In total he made 6 appearances scoring 37 points, however it was not enough as they were relegated to the Georgian First League.

=== Khvamli Tbilisi ===
In 2022 he joined Khvamli Tbilisi in the Didi 10, he featured once for the side coming off the bench in the final round of the season, beating RC Aia Kutaisi 18–17.

=== Batumi ===
He was named in the RC Batumi squad for the 2023–24 Didi 10 season however he did not feature.

=== Montpellier ===
In July 2023 he was set to be joining Top 14 side Montpellier for two seasons, however the deal did not go through with Ryan Louwrens signing for the French side instead.

=== Kochebi Bolnisi ===
He was named in the RC Kochebi Bolnisi squad for the 2024–25 Didi 10 season.

=== Castres ===
Matkava joined Castres Olympique in April 2025 for the rest of the 2024-25 Top 14 season as injury cover for Pierre Poplin. He made his debut in round 22 of the Top 14 starting at fly-half in a 52–6 loss against Toulouse, he scored Castres only point of the game in 2 penalties.

=== Oyonnax ===
Matkava joined Oyonnax in the Pro D2 ahead of the 2025–26 season, signing for 2 seasons joining fellow country men Vasil Lobzhanidze and Vano Karkadze.

== International career ==
=== Youth ===
Matkava was pivotal in Georgia's 2019 Rugby Europe Under-18 Championship campaign. Starting at scrum-half in all three of their matches, scoring in their 64–10 win over host country Russia.

He featured for Georgia under-19 when South Africa under-19 toured Georgia.

=== Senior ===
Matkava was named in the 35-man squad for the Autumn internationals, making his international debut coming off the bench against Uruguay in the 2022 Autumn internationals. He again came off the bench in Georgia's historic victory against Wales, he slotted the winning penalty in the 77th minute to seal the victory.

He appeared in all of Georgia's matches in the 2023 Rugby Europe Championship, where in which Georgia went unbeaten, winning the competition for the 15th time. He started only once, his first international start, in the round one victory over Germany where in which he went onto to win Player of the Match. He was named in the Georgian squad for the 2023 Rugby World Cup Warmups, where he featured in another historic win for Georgia starting at fly-half in a historic win over Romania. Matkava scoring 5 conversions, 1 penalty and a try in the largest ever win for Georgia over Romania. He made his Rugby World Cup debut starting in a 35–15 loss to Australia where he was considered the best performer of the Georgia players. He featured in all of Georgia's matches, starting in all but the draw against Portugal. Georgia came 4th in Pool C, unable to win a match.

Matkava started at fly-half in all of Georgia's matches in the 2024 Rugby Europe Championship including the final where he scored 16 points in a 36–10 win over Portugal. He made his first international start at full back in the 2024 mid-year rugby union tests against Fiji in Batumi, He scored all of Georgia's points in the 12–21 loss. The following week on the 13 July, Matkava started in Georgia's 3rd ever win over a Tier 1 nation, scoring 10 points in a famous 23–25 victory over Japan.

== Statistics ==
=== International tries ===
Try	Opposing team	Location	Venue	Competition	Date	Result	Score
1	Germany	Tbilisi, Georgia	Avchala Stadium	2023 Rugby Europe Championship	February 5, 2023	Victory	72–12
2	Romania	Tbilisi, Georgia	Mikheil Meskhi Stadium	2023 Rugby World Cup Warmups	August 12, 2023	Victory	56–6
3	Switzerland	Tbilisi, Georgia	Avchala Stadium	2025 Rugby Europe Championship	February 1, 2025	Victory	110–0

== Honours ==
Georgia U18

- Rugby Europe U18 Championship: 2019

Georgia

- Rugby Europe Championship: 2023, 2024, 2025
- Antim Cup: March 2023, August 2023, 2024, 2025

Black Lion

- Rugby Europe Super Cup: 2021-22, 2022, 2023, 2024
