= 2018–19 Didi 10 season =

- Countries: Georgia
- Date: 1 September 2018 – 13 May 2019
- Champions: Batumi
- Runners-up: Kharebi
- Matches played: 180

Official website
- site.rugby.ge

The 2018–19 Didi 10 competition is Georgian domestic rugby union competition operated by Georgian Rugby Union. One new team from I league was promoted to Didi 10 (Vepkhvebi) and Bagrati Kutaisi was relegated.

== Teams ==
Locations of the 2016-17 Didi 10 teams.
- Lelo: Official site
- Aia: Official site
- Locomotive
- Kharebi
- Armazi
- Army
- Jiki
- Vepkhvebi
- Batumi
- Academy

== Table ==
2018–19 Didi 10 table
Pos	Team	Pld	W	D	L	PF	PA	PD	TB	LB	Pts	Qualification
1	Batumi RC	18	15	0	3	410	271	+139	4	2	66	Play-off place 2018–19 European Rugby Continental Shield
2	Rustavi Kharebi	18	13	1	4	341	268	+73	3	3	60	Play-off place 2018–19 European Rugby Continental Shield
3	Locomotive	18	11	0	7	415	280	+135	5	6	55	Didi 10 finals
4	Aia Kutaisi	18	9	1	8	364	365	−1	1	3	42	Didi 10 finals
5	Armazi	18	8	1	9	380	303	+77	4	4	42	Didi 10 finals
6	Lelo Saracens	18	8	0	10	297	337	−40	1	4	37	Didi 10 finals
7	Jiki	18	6	1	11	322	340	−18	3	7	36	
8	Academy	18	6	2	10	249	387	−138	1	2	31	
9	Vepkhvebi	18	4	2	12	342	436	−94	2	8	30	
10	RC Army	18	6	0	12	273	406	−133	0	4	28	Relegated

Updated to match(es) played on unknown. Source:
Rules for classification: If teams are level at any stage, tiebreakers are applied in the following order:
1. Match results, between tied teams
2. Difference of points for and against, between tied teams
3. Tries For and Against, between tied teams
4. Total points scored for and against
5. Total tries scored for and against
6. Red cards
7. Yellow cards

== Playoffs ==
TBD
