= Nodar Tcheishvili =

Georgia international rugby union player

- Born: 19 December 1990 (age 35) Tbilisi, Georgian SSR, Soviet Union
- Height: 2.01 m (6 ft 7 in)
- Weight: 118 kg (260 lb; 18 st 8 lb)

Rugby union career
- Position: Lock
- Current team: RC Army Tbilisi
Senior career
Years	Team	Apps	(Points)
2011–2013	Lelo Saracens	??	(??)
2013–2014	USON Nevers	0	(0)
2014–2015	La Seyne	12	(5)
2015–2017	Lelo Saracens	46	(10)
2017–2018	Chambéry	21	(0)
2018–2019	Cornish Pirates	3	(0)
2019–2020	London Scottish	6	(0)
2020–2021	RC Aia Kutaisi	4	(10)
2021–2022	RC Locomotive Tbilisi	0	(0)
2021–2024	The Black Lion	31	(10)
2024–	RC Army Tbilisi	0	(0)
- Correct as of 30 July 2024
International career
Years	Team	Apps	(Points)
2016–	Georgia	54	(5)
- Correct as of 30 July 2024

Nodar Tcheishvili (Georgian: ნოდარ ჭეიშვილი; born 19 December 1990) is a Georgian professional rugby union player who plays as a lock for Super Cup club Black Lion and the Georgia national team.

== Club career ==
He joined USON Nevers in 2013 from Lelo Saracens after winning the Didi 10, where he started in the final against Locomotive Tbilisi. He signed for La Seyne in 2014. He spent a season and a half at La Seyne in the French Fédérale 1, before leaving in 2015 returning home to Lelo Saracens. Going on to win the Didi 10. In 2016 he had a trail at Northampton Saints however did not earn a full contract.

In 2017 after finishing third in the Didi 10 with Lelo Saracens he returned to France and joined Chambéry, where he played a single season. Going on to move to RFU Championship club Cornish Pirates in 2018 signing a one-year contract. In 2019 he joined rival RFU Championship club London Scottish. He returned to Georgia in 2020, playing 4 games for RC Aia Kutaisi, winning the Didi 10 once again.

In 2021 he joined Black Lion for the inaugural Rugby Europe Super Cup season, starting in all their games including the final against the Lusitanos. He was named in the Locomotive Tbilisi squad for the 2021–22 season however didn't featured due to his Black Lion commitments.

He travelled with Black Lion for the 2022 Currie Cup First Division, scoring his first try for the club in a 27–42 win over the SWD Eagles. In the 2022 Rugby Europe Super Cup he once against started in every game, scoring in the semi-final against Castilla y León Iberians.

He featured in all of Black Lions 2023–24 EPCR Challenge Cup campaign, starting in their historic victory against the Scarlets.

He signed for RC Army Tbilisi ahead of the 2024–25 Didi 10 season.

== Honours ==
=== Lelo Saracens ===
- Didi 10
  - Champions: (2) 2012–13, 2015–16

=== RC Aia Kutaisi ===
- Didi 10
  - Champions: (1) 2020–21

=== Black Lion ===
- Rugby Europe Super Cup
  - Champions: (3) 2021–22, 2022, 2023

=== Georgia ===
- Rugby Europe Championship
  - Champions: (8) 2015–16, 2018, 2019, 2020, 2021, 2022, 2023, 2024
  - Runners-up: (1) 2017
