= Mikheil Babunashvili =

Georgian rugby union player

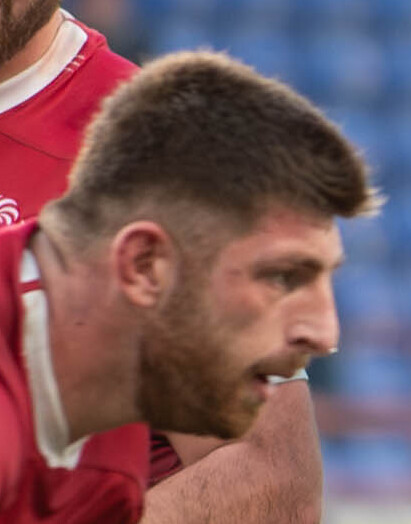
- Born: 31 May 1996 (age 30) Kutaisi, Georgia
- Height: 195 cm (6 ft 5 in)
- Weight: 115 kg (254 lb)
- Notable relative: Guga Babunashvili (father)

Rugby union career
- Position: Lock, Flanker
- Current team: Black Lion, RC Aia Kutaisi
Youth career
- 2014-2016: Tarbes Pyrénées
Senior career
Years	Team	Apps	(Points)
2016-	RC Aia Kutaisi		
2021-	Black Lion	38	(25)
- Correct as of 19 March 2025
International career
Years	Team	Apps	(Points)
2015-2016	Georgia under-20	9	(10)
2020	Georgia XV	1	(0)
2022-	Georgia	33	(15)
- Correct as of 19 March 2025

Mikheil Babunashvili (Georgian: მიხეილ ბაბუნაშვილი; born 31 May 1996) is a Georgian rugby union player who plays as a lock and flanker for Black Lion and RC Aia Kutaisi.

== Club career ==
=== RC Aia Kutaisi ===
He began playing at Aia Kutaisi as a kid, where his father Guga Babunashvili, who was also a Georgian International, played. After for playing for Tarbes Pyrénées Espoirs in France, Babunashvili moved back to his home town to play for Aia Kutaisi in the Didi 10.

=== Black Lion ===
He was named in the initial Black Lion squad for the inaugural Rugby Europe Super Cup. In the following season he was named in the Team of the Pool Phase.

== International career ==
=== Georgia under-20 ===
He helped Georgia under-20 earn promotion to the 2016 World Rugby U20 Championship, winning the 2015 World Rugby Under 20 Trophy, starting and scoring in the final against Canada.

=== Georgia ===
He made his debut against Portugal, starting in a 23–14 win. He was called up to the Georgia squad for the 2023 Rugby World Cup replacing Lasha Jaiani due a knee injury. However Babunashvili never featured in the competition. In the 2024 Rugby Europe Championship he was nominated for the Player of the Pool Stage.

== Honors ==
=== Georgia under-20 ===
- World Rugby U20 Trophy
  - Champions: (1) 2015

=== Georgia ===
- Rugby Europe Championship
  - Champions: (3) 2023, 2024, 2025

=== RC Aia Kutaisi ===
- Didi 10
  - Champions: (2) 2020–21, 2023–24
  - Runners up: (1) 2017–18

=== Black Lion ===
- Rugby Europe Super Cup
  - Champions: (4) 2021–22, 2022, 2023, 2024
