= Alexander Todua =

Georgia international rugby union player

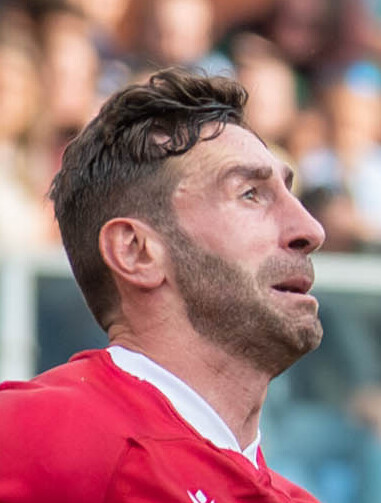
- Full name: Alexander Todua
- Born: 2 November 1987 (age 39) Tbilisi, Georgia
- Height: 1.80 m (5 ft 11 in)
- Weight: 92 kg (14 st 7 lb; 203 lb)

Rugby union career
- Position(s): Outside Centre, Wing, Fullback
- Current team: RC Batumi, Black Lion
Senior career
Years	Team	Apps	(Points)
20??-2012	Lelo Saracens		
2012-2014	SC Albi	36	(15)
2014-2018	Lelo Saracens		
2014	Tbilisi Caucasians	2	(0)
2018-	RC Batumi		
2021-	Black Lion	28	(35)
- Correct as of 18 March 2025
International career
Years	Team	Apps	(Points)
2008-2025	Georgia	122	(100)
- Correct as of 18 March 2025
National sevens team
Years	Team		Comps
2013	Georgia		1
- Correct as of 26 August 2024

Sandro Todua (born 2 November 1987 in Tbilisi, Georgia) is a Georgian rugby union player. He plays as a winger for the Rugby Europe Super Cup side Black Lion and for Didi 10 side RC Batumi.

== Club career ==
Todua began his career at Lelo Saracens in his home town Tbilisi, after coming second in the league in 2007 and 2008, they won the Didi 10 in the 2008–09 season, beating Batumi in the final.

In 2012 Todua moved to France to play for SC Albi in the Pro D2, he spent 2 seasons at the club making 36 appearances scoring 3 tries.

He returned to Lelo Saracens in 2014, at his second stint at the club he won the Didi 10 back to back in the 2014–15 and 2015–16. He was selected to be part of the Tbilisi Caucasians team for the 2014 European Rugby Challenge Cup Qualifying Competition, playing in both matches against Rugby Rovigo Delta.

He joined Batumi in 2018, winning the Didi 10 that year.

He joined Black Lion for the inaugural Rugby Europe Super Cup, starting in their first ever match a 33–10 win over Tel Aviv Heat. He went on to start in the final against the Lusitanos winning 17–10. Todua scored in both the semifinal and final of the 2023 Rugby Europe Super Cup, winning the competition. He started in all of Black Lion's games in the 2023–24 EPCR Challenge Cup, including the famous win over Scarlets.

== International career ==
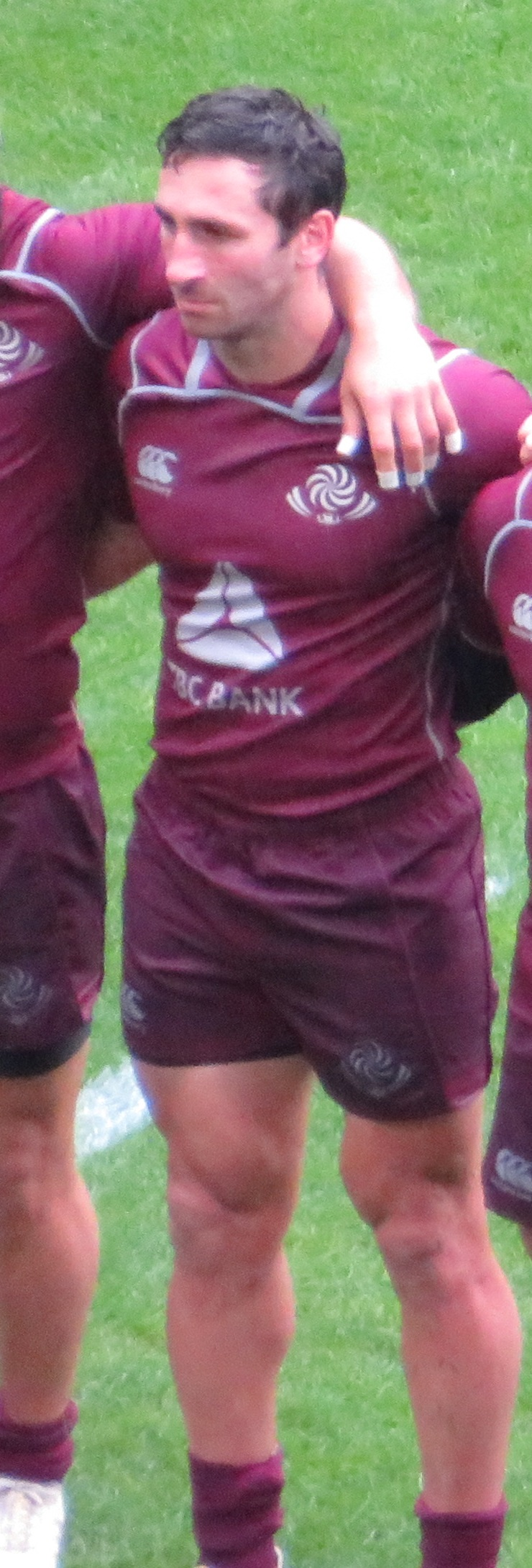
Todua in 2018

He made his debut for the national side in 2008, starting against the Czech Republic in Prague. His first try came against the USA in the 2009 Churchill Cup, scoring in a 31–13 loss.

He was selected for the 2011 Rugby World Cup in New Zealand, he started in all of Georgia's matches, including their only win of the tournament, a 25–9 win over European rivals Romania. In 2013 he was selected to be part of the Georgia sevens squad for the 2013 Rugby World Cup Sevens.

He was selected for the 2015 Rugby World Cup in England, however only featured twice. Starting in Georgia's first ever match against New Zealand and Namibia. The win over Namibia was Todua's 50th cap. It was their most successful tournament, with them winning two games and automatically qualifying for the 2019 Rugby World Cup in Japan.

He scored his 10th try in a Test match against the French Barbarians in May 2018. In the following year he was selected for his 3rd World Cup. He featured in three out of their four games, scoring twice against Uruguay and Australia.

In 2022 he scored in Georgia's first ever win over a Tier 1 nation, when they beat Italy 28–19. He won his 100th cap in 34–18 win over Uruguay. The same year he scored in Georgia's second ever win over a Tier 1 nation, in November 2022 beating Wales 13–12 in Cardiff.

He was named in the Georgia squad for the 2023 Rugby World Cup in France, he became one of six Georgians to play at four Rugby World Cup tournaments. He only featured once in a draw against Portugal.

In November 2024, against the All Blacks XV, Todua played his 115th match for Georgia.

== Statistics ==
=== Internationals tries ^{As of 26 August 2024} ===
Try	Opposing team	Location	Venue	Competition	Date	Result	Score
1	United States	Colorado, United States	Dick's Sporting Goods Park	2009 Churchill Cup	June 21, 2009	Loss	31–13
2	Uruguay	Tbilisi, Georgia	Avchala Stadium	2013 IRB Tbilisi Cup	June 11, 2013	Win	27–3
3	Spain	Tbilisi, Georgia	Avchala Stadium	2014 IRB Tbilisi Cup	June 14, 2014	Win	23–13
4	Germany	Heusenstamm, Germany	Kultur- und Sportzentrum Martinsee	2014–16 European Nations Cup First Division	February 7, 2015	Win	8–64
5	Germany	Heusenstamm, Germany	Kultur- und Sportzentrum Martinsee	2014–16 European Nations Cup First Division	February 7, 2015	Win	8–64
6	Spain	Tbilisi, Georgia	Mikheil Meskhi Stadium	2014–16 European Nations Cup First Division	February 27, 2016	Win	38–7
7	Romania	Tbilisi, Georgia	Boris Paichadze Dinamo Arena	2014–16 European Nations Cup First Division	March 19, 2016	Win	38–9
8	Belgium	Kutaisi, Georgia	AIA Arena	2018 Rugby Europe Championship	February 10, 2018	Win	47–0
9	Germany	Offenbach am Main, Germany	Sparda Bank Hessen Stadium	2018 Rugby Europe Championship	February 17, 2018	Win	0–64
10	(France) French Barbarians	Tbilisi, Georgia	Boris Paichadze Dinamo Arena	Test match	May 31, 2018	Win	16–15
11	Fiji	Sydney, Australia	ANZ Stadium	2018 Pacific Nations Cup	June 16, 2018	Loss	37–15
12	Uruguay	Saitama, Japan	Kumagaya Rugby Stadium	2019 Rugby World Cup	September 29, 2019	Win	33–7
13	Australia	Fukuroi City, Japan	Shizuoka Stadium Ecopa	2019 Rugby World Cup	October 11, 2019	Loss	27–8
14	Romania	Bucharest, Romania	Stadionul National Arcul de Triumf	2022 Rugby Europe Championship	March 12, 2022	Win	23–26
15	Italy	Batumi, Georgia	Adjarabet Arena	Test match	July 10, 2022	Win	28–19
16	Wales	Cardiff, Wales	Millennium Stadium	Autumn Nations Cup	November 19, 2022	Win	12–13
17	Spain	Torrelavega, Spain	Estadio El Malecon	2023 Rugby Europe Championship	February 18, 2023	Win	3–41
18	Romania	Tbilisi, Georgia	Avchala Stadium	2023 Rugby Europe Championship	March 5, 2023	Win	31–7

== Honours ==
=== Lelo Saracens ===
- Didi 10
  - Champions: (3) 2008–09, 2014–15, 2015–16
  - Runners-up: (3) 2006–07, 2007–08, 2009–10
- Georgia Cup
  - Champions: (3) 2008, 2009, 2010

=== RC Batumi ===
- Didi 10
  - Champions: (2) 2018–19, 2021–22
  - Runners-up: (2) 2020–21, 2022–23

=== Black Lion ===
- Rugby Europe Super Cup
  - Champions: (3) 2021–22, 2022, 2023

=== Georgia ===
- Rugby Europe Championship
  - Champions: (14) 2008–10, 2011, 2012, 2013, 2014, 2015, 2016, 2017–18, 2018–19, 2019–20, 2020–21, 2021–22, 2022–23, 2023–24
  - Runners-up: (2) 2010, 2016–17
- Tbilisi Cup
  - Runners-up: (1) 2014
- Nations Cup
  - Runners-up: (2) 2008, 2011
