= Tengiz Zamtaradze =

Georgian rugby union player

- Full name: Tengiz Zamtaradze
- Born: 2 January 1998 (age 28) Georgia
- Height: 181 cm (5 ft 11 in)
- Weight: 96 kg (212 lb; 15 st 2 lb)

Rugby union career
- Position: Hooker
- Current team: Black Lion, Lelo Saracens
Youth career
- 20??-2018: Lelo Saracens
Senior career
Years	Team	Apps	(Points)
2018-	Lelo Saracens	??	(??)
2021-	Black Lion	20	(30)
- Correct as of 20 October 2023
International career
Years	Team	Apps	(Points)
2016	Georgia under-18	??	(??)
2017-2018	Georgia under-20	??	(??)
2023-	Georgia	7	(5)
- Correct as of 20 October 2023

Tengiz Zamtaradze (born 2 January 1998) is a Georgian rugby union player who plays for Black Lion in the Rugby Europe Super Cup, and Challenge Cup.

== Club career ==
He began his career at Lelo Saracens, before joining Black Lion for their debut season. Making his debut against Israeli side Tel Aviv Heat, coming off the bench in a 33–10 win. He came off the bench in both the 2021-22 and 2022 Rugby Europe Super Cup Finals.

== International career ==
He featured for Georgia in the 2016 and 2017 World Rugby Under 20 Championship.

He made his international debut coming off the bench against Germany in the 2023 Rugby Europe Championship, he was named in the Georgian squad for the 2023 Rugby World Cup. In the fixture against Portugal he scored in the 78th minute, to draw the match level. He started against Fiji however was injured in the 11th minute, fracturing a bone and dislocating his elbow.

== Honors ==
=== Georgia Under-18 ===
- Rugby Europe Under-18 Championship
  - Runners-up: (1) 2016

=== Georgia ===
- Rugby Europe Championship
  - Champions: (1) 2023

=== Black Lion ===
- Rugby Europe Super Cup
  - Champions: (3) 2021–22, 2022, 2023

=== Lelo Saracens ===
- Didi 10
  - Runners-up: (1) 2023–24
