= Nika Amashukeli =

Georgian rugby referee

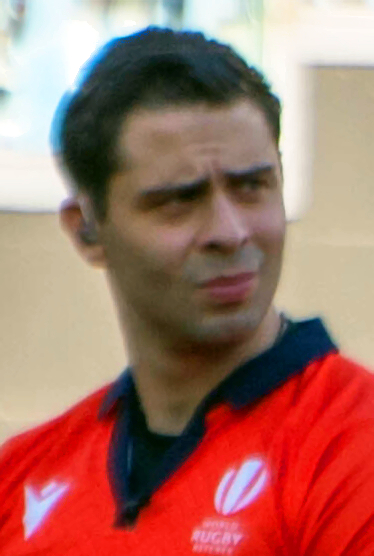
- Born: 18 September 1994 (age 32) Tbilisi, Georgia

Rugby union career
- Position: Flanker / Centre
Senior career
Years	Team	Apps	(Points)
–	Jiki		
International career
Years	Team	Apps	(Points)
–	Georgia U18		
Refereeing career
Years	Competition		Apps
-	Didi 10		
–	All-Ireland League		
–	Rugby Europe U18		
–	WR U20 Trophy		
–	WR U20 Championship		
–	Rugby Europe		
–	Continental Shield		
–	Challenge Cup		10
–	Champions Cup		9
–	URC		3
–	Top 14		2
–	U20 Six Nations		
–	Six Nations		2
–	The Rugby Championship		1
–	WR 7s Series		2
–	Rugby World Cup		3
- Correct as of 13 August 2023

Nika Amashukeli (Georgian: ნიკა ამაშუკელი) is a Georgian rugby union and World Rugby referee.

== Background ==
In his early youth, Amashukeli played soccer. Amashukeli watched his first ever full rugby match on TV during the 2007 Rugby World Cup, when his father "literally forced" him to watch Ireland v Georgia.

Amashukeli started playing rugby for Jiki at the age of 11. He played as a flanker then inside centre, and as an outside centre for Georgia at U17, U18 and U19 levels. He was selected for Georgia U18 team for 2012 European Under-18 Rugby Union Championship. By the age of 20 he had already suffered five concussions. He had also broken an ankle, and there was a knee problem. Head injuries affected his mental health at that time; eventually he decided to retire from playing.

== Refereeing career ==
In 2013 Georgian Rugby Union started a program aimed at improving the standard of Georgian referees; a new relationship with IRFU has started. This included Irish referees regularly officiating Georgian domestic league matches, Georgian referees officiating All-Ireland League matches and attending IRFU workshops. Amashukeli was among the first young referees recruited through this program in 2013. His first match in Ireland was between Old Christians and St Mary's in the Munster Junior League.

Amashukeli made his test debut as a referee in the Montenegro v Estonia European Nations Cup Third Division match on 11 April 2015; he refereed the 1st half and was replaced by Shota Tevzadze at half-time.

In 2016, in an incident after a Georgian domestic league match between Batumi and Army, Amashukeli was stabbed in the leg with a knife by one of the Army club officials.

In 2019 he attracted rugby followers' attention when during the U20 Six Nations match he was temporarily substituted after a blood injury. Amashukeli left the field, stitched the cutting and returned in 12 minutes to finish the match.

Highlight of Amashukeli's career was 2019 World Rugby Under 20 Championship in Argentina, where World Rugby was highly impressed with emerging Georgian talent as afterwards he got appointments from Joël Jutge to referee in EPCR competitions. Amashukeli himself admits that Joël Jutge had an invaluable positive influence on his career.

He was named as the best Georgian referee many times since 2013.

After working alongside Wayne Barnes during the Autumn Nations Cup in 2020, Amashukeli rated Wayne Barnes as the number 1 referee in the world at the moment.

In 2020 Amashukeli launched a Facebook page named "Rugby Laboratory" where he posts videos explaining basics of rugby laws to new supporters of the game.

In 2021 Amashukeli had a successful debut in July internationals, having officiated on Wales v Canada match, first ever Georgian to do tier 1 nations game. His second match Romania v Scotland was called off due to COVID-19 restrictions. Amashukeli's pathway continued through as he got top level appointments on November internationals, set to officiate in Ireland v Japan, French Barbarians v Tonga and Wales v Australia matches.

Amashukeli is coached and mentored by David McHugh, who is employed by Georgian Rugby Union as a Head of Referees Committee. Amashukeli claims that McHugh has been the biggest influence on his career and changed the way he thinks. Amashukeli describes McHugh as a great guy, very professional, very friendly, strong and knowledgeable manager who makes a lot of effort to improve Didi 10 referees. According to Amashukeli, McHugh is not only a coach for him, but also his friend.

In February 2023, Amashukeli was included in World Rugby's list of candidates to be a referee at the 2023 Rugby World Cup. On 10 May 2023 he was selected as a referee in the list of match officials for the 2023 Rugby World Cup.

He will also referee the 2024–25 European Rugby Champions Cup Final

== List of Tier 1 tests ==
Since 2021, Amashukeli has regularly been appointed to test matches involving Tier 1 national teams. The list below includes all of his Tier 1 test appointments in Six Nations, Rugby Championship and international tours.

Date	Home	PF	PA	Away	Tournament
3 July 2021	Wales	68	12	Canada	Summer tours
6 November 2021	Ireland	60	5	Japan	Autumn tours
27 February 2022	Ireland	57	6	Italy	Six Nations
2 July 2022	South Africa	32	29	Wales	Summer tours
27 August 2022	New Zealand	18	25	Argentina	Rugby Championship
29 October 2022	Japan	31	38	New Zealand	Autumn tours
5 November 2022	Ireland	19	16	South Africa	Autumn tours
26 February 2023	France	32	21	Scotland	Six Nations
5 August 2023	Argentina	13	24	South Africa	RWC warm-ups
12 August 2023	England	19	17	Wales	RWC warm-ups
19 August 2023	France	34	17	Fiji	RWC warm-ups
9 September 2023	Ireland	82	8	Romania	Rugby World Cup
17 September 2023	England	34	12	Japan	Rugby World Cup
1 October 2023	Australia	34	14	Portugal	Rugby World Cup
9 March 2024	England	23	22	Ireland	Six Nations
6 July 2024	New Zealand	16	15	England	Summer tours
13 July 2024	Australia	36	28	Wales	Summer tours
16 November 2024	France	30	29	New Zealand	Autumn tours
8 February 2025	England	26	25	France	Six Nations
14 September 2025	New Zealand	10	43	South Africa	Rugby Championship
