= Shalva Mamukashvili =

Georgian rugby union player

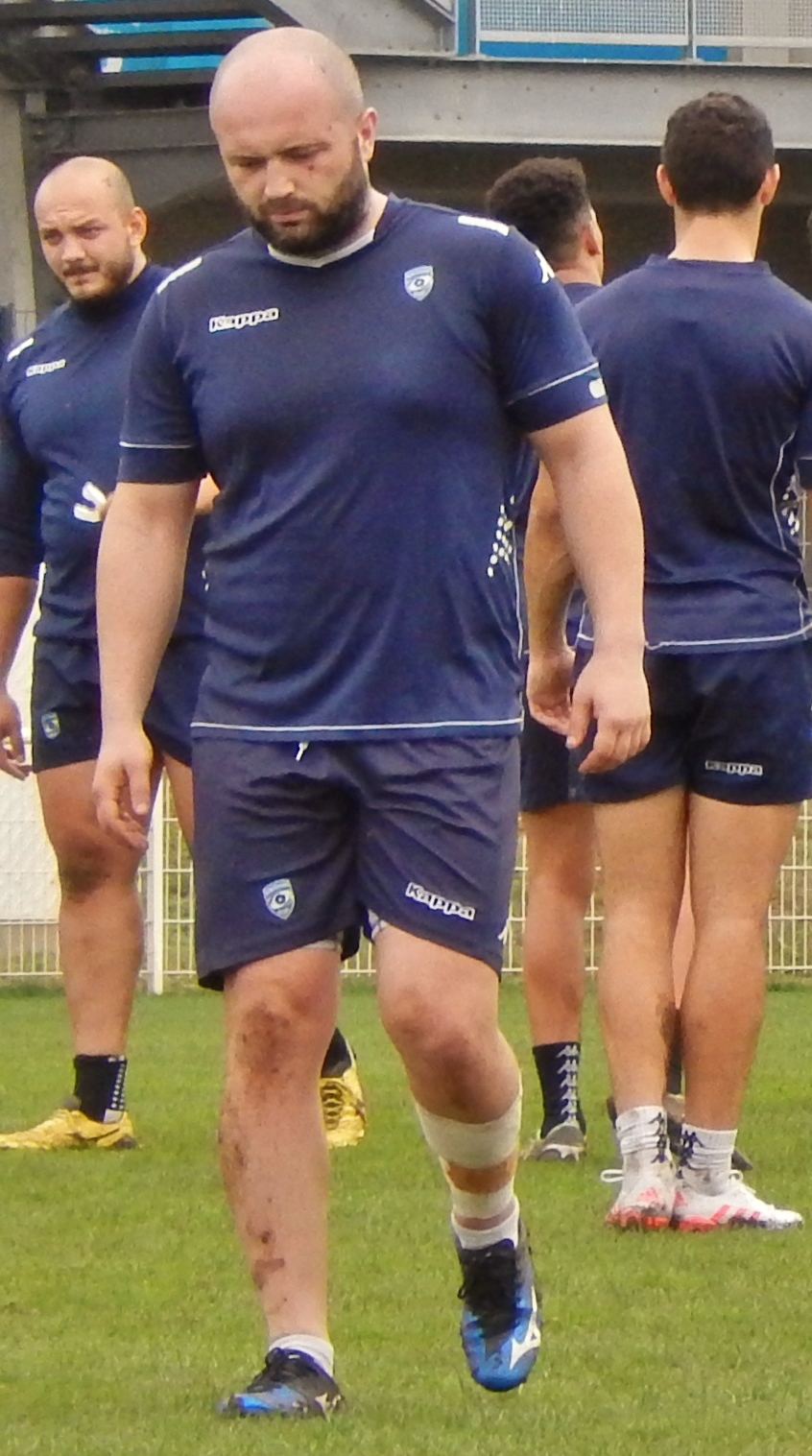
- Born: 2 October 1990 (age 36) Tbilisi, Georgian SSR, Soviet Union
- Height: 1.81 m (5 ft 11 in)
- Weight: 102 kg (225 lb; 16 st 1 lb)

Rugby union career
- Position: Hooker
- Current team: The Black Lion
Senior career
Years	Team	Apps	(Points)
2008–2012	Kochebi Bolnisi		
2012–2014	Armia Tbilisi		
2014–2015	Sale Sharks	11	(0)
2015–2016	Glasgow Warriors	6	(0)
2016–2017	Montpellier	14	(15)
2017	Toulon	1	(0)
2017	US Carcassonne	8	(0)
2018	Locomotive	16	(0)
2018–2019	Enisei-STM	5	(0)
2020	Leicester Tigers	1	(0)
2021–	The Black Lion	20	(70)
- Correct as of 12 May 2023
International career
Years	Team	Apps	(Points)
2011–	Georgia	103	(60)
- Correct as of 12 May 2023

Shalva Mamukashvili (Georgian: შალვა მამუკაშვილი; born 2 October 1990) is a Georgian professional rugby union player who plays as a hooker for Super Cup club The Black Lion and the Georgia national team.

== Professional career ==
Mamukashvili first played for Armia during the Georgia Championship; he went on to feature in Georgia's 2012 European Nations Cup squad, making his debut against Spain. Mamukashvili also appeared in the sides 2012 end of year tour campaign.

On 15 August 2014, Shalva signed a contract to join Sale Sharks in the Aviva Premiership in England from the 2014–15 season. On 11 November 2015, Shalva signed a contract to join Glasgow Warriors until the end of the 2015–16 season.

In 2020, he returned to England to join Leicester Tigers ahead of the 2020–21 season. On 23 February 2021 Leicester announced that they had come to an agreement with Shalva to release him from his contract early.
