= Soso Matiashvili =

Georgian rugby union player

- Born: 27 January 1993 (age 33) Tbilisi, Georgia
- Height: 1.85 m (6 ft 1 in)
- Weight: 85 kg (13 st 5 lb)

Rugby union career
- Position(s): Wing, Fullback
Senior career
Years	Team	Apps	(Points)
2014–2017	RC Academy Tbilisi	56	(55)
2017–2018	Krasny Yar	9	(41)
2018–	Lelo Saracens		
2021–2023	Black Lion	5	(10)
- Correct as of 2 August 2024
International career
Years	Team	Apps	(Points)
2017–2021	Georgia	32	(159)
- Correct as of 2 August 2024

Soso Matiashvili (born 27 January 1993) is a Georgian rugby union player. His plays on the wing, for Lelo Saracens in the Georgia Championship and the Georgia national team. He was named in Georgia's squad for the 2017 summer test series against the United States, Canada and Argentina.

== Honours ==
=== Krasny Yar Krasnoyarsk ===
- Russian Professional Rugby League
- Runner-up: (1) 2017–18

=== Lelo Saracens ===
- Didi 10
- Runners-up: (1) 2023–24

=== Black Lion ===
- Rugby Europe Super Cup
- Champions: (3) 2021–22, 2022, 2023

=== Georgia ===
- Rugby Europe Championship
- Champions: (4) 2018, 2019, 2020, 2021
