= Vazha Khutsishvili =

Georgian rugby union player

- Born: 27 June 1993 (age 33) Rustavi, Georgia
- Height: 1.65 m (5 ft 5 in)
- Weight: 73 kg (11 st 7 lb)

Rugby union career
- Position: Scrum-half
Senior career
Years	Team	Apps	(Points)
- Rustavi Kharebi
2015–	Lokomotivi		
- Correct as of 4 September 2015
International career
Years	Team	Apps	(Points)
2013–	Georgia	24	(0)
- Correct as of 24 June 2016

Vazha Khutsishvili (born 27 June 1993) is a Georgian rugby union player who plays at scrum-half for Rustavi Kharebi in the Georgia Championship and the Georgia national team. He was named in the Georgian squad for the 2015 Rugby World Cup.
