= Lasha Khmaladze =

Georgia international rugby union player

- Full name: Lasha Khmaladze
- Born: 20 January 1988 (age 38) Tbilisi, Georgia SSR, USSR
- Height: 178 cm (5 ft 10 in)
- Weight: 83 kg (183 lb; 13 st 1 lb)

Rugby union career
- Position(s): Fly-half, Fullback
- Current team: RC Batumi
Senior career
Years	Team	Apps	(Points)
2010-2017	Lelo Saracens	68	(289)
2014	Tbilisi Caucasians	2	(12)
2017–	RC Batumi		
2021-2023	Black Lion	16	(20)
- Correct as of 13 August 2024
International career
Years	Team	Apps	(Points)
2008	Georgia under-20		
2008-2023	Georgia	97	(53)
- Correct as of 13 August 2024
National sevens team
Years	Team		Comps
2017	Georgia		2
- Correct as of 13 August 2024

Lasha Khmaladze (born 20 January 1988, Tbilisi) is a Georgian rugby union player who plays as a fly-half and fullback for RC Batumi in the Georgia Championship.

== Club career ==
=== Lelo Saracens ===
He began playing at Lelo Saracens in 2010, winning the Didi 10 four times in a row, between 2012–13 and 2015–16. At the end of the 2013–14 Didi 10 season he won player of the year.

=== Tbilisi Caucasians ===
In 2014 he was called up to the Tbilisi Caucasians squad for the European Rugby Challenge Cup Qualifying Competition, starting at flyhalf in both their matches against Rovigo Delta scoring 2 tries in the second match.

=== RC Batumi ===
In 2017 he moved to RC Batumi, going on to win the 2018–19 and the 2021–22 Didi 10 seasons. He featured for the side in the 2017–18 European Rugby Continental Shield.

=== Black Lion ===
In 2021 he was named in the Black Lion squad for the inaugural Rugby Europe Super Cup season going on to start in the final at fullback in a 14–17 win over the Lusitanos.

== International career ==
He made his debut on 11 June 2008 in an 11–3 loss to the Emerging Springboks, in Bucharest, at the IRB Nations Cup, aged 20 years old. He played in the 2011 Rugby World Cup qualifying matches and was called for the final squad. He played three games at the 2011 Rugby World Cup, one of them as a substitute, scoring a try in a 25–7 loss to Argentina on 2 October 2011.

Khmaladze became a regular player for Georgia, playing in the side that reached their fourth Rugby World Cup qualification in a row to the 2015 Rugby World Cup in England. He went on to feature in both the 2019 and the 2023 Rugby World Cups.
