= Viktor Kolelishvili =

Georgia international rugby union player

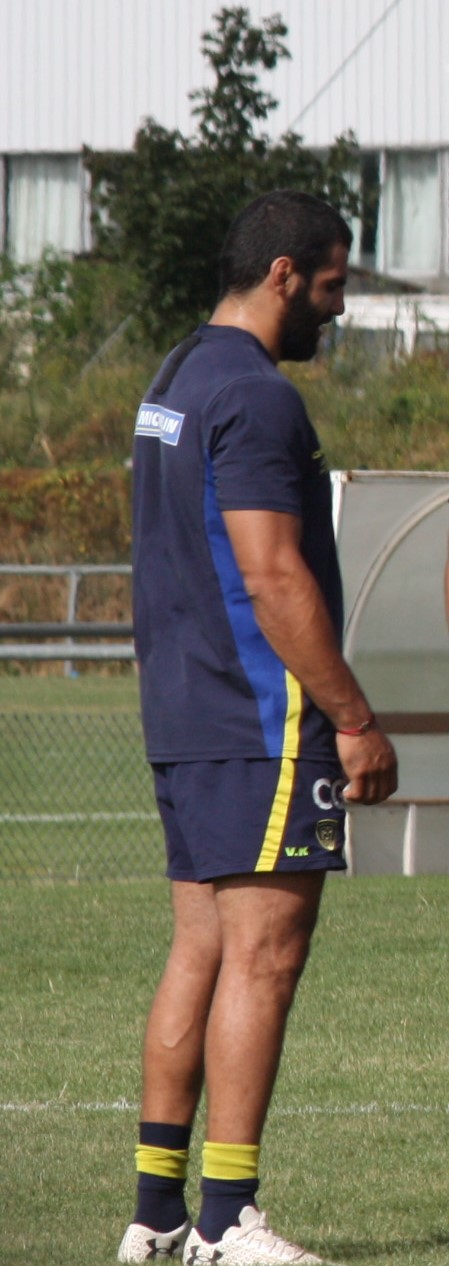
- Born: 9 October 1989 (age 37) Tbilisi, Georgian SSR, Soviet Union
- Height: 1.92 m (6 ft 3 1/2 in)
- Weight: 105 kg (16 st 7 lb; 231 lb)

Rugby union career
- Position(s): Flanker, Number 8
	Lelo Saracens	6	(0)
2011–19	Clermont Auvergne	19	(25)
2013-2014	Lyon (loan)	48	(15)
- Correct as of 4 September 2015
International career
Years	Team	Apps	(Points)
2008–2018	Georgia	50	(25)
- Correct as of 23 June 2018

Viktor (Vito) Kolelishvili (born 9 October 1989) is a Georgian rugby union player. His position is flanker, and he currently plays for Clermont Auvergne in the Top 14 and the Georgia national team. He played for Georgia in the 2011 Rugby World Cup.

Viktor Kolelishvili started his career in Tbilisi, with the club Lelo Tbilisi. He plays for the Lelo's first team in the Georgia Championship very young and impresses both in attack and defence. He is called up by the Georgia national team for the 2008 IRB Nations Cup and hold his first cap at only 18 years old against Italy A.
In 2011, he moved to the French side ASM Clermont Auvergne and won the U23 championship. Few months later, he joins the Georgian squad to play the 2011 RWC and took part of games against Scotland and Argentina.
He played his first Top 14 game in May 2012 against Castres. For the 2013–2014 season, he joined Lyon OU, loaned by Clermont. After an impressive season in Pro D2, he is back in Top14 with Clermont for the 2014–2015 season by suffered of an ACL injury and was out for the rest of the season.

His very rough playing style have led Kolelishvili to collect eight yellow cards in his international career, matched in this unenviable record only by the Australian Michael Hooper.
