= RC Batumi =

Rugby union club based in Batumi, Georgia

- Full name: Rugby Club Batumi LLC
- Union: Georgia Rugby Union
- Founded: 1969; 57 years ago
- Location: Batumi, Georgia
- Region: Adjara
- Ground: Batumi Rugby Stadium (Capacity: 2 555)
- Director of Rugby: Gela Kobuladze
- Coach: Irakli Ninidze
- Captain: Giorgi Tkhilaishvili
- League: Didi 10
- 2023–24: 5th
1st kit	2nd kit

Rugby Club Batumi LLC is a Georgian professional rugby union club from Batumi, who plays in the Didi 10, the first division of Georgian rugby. They have won the competition a total of 5 times.

== History ==
=== Didi 10 ===
They have won the top flight competition in Georgia 4 times over its history, the first coming in 1998–99, beating then reigning champions RC Kochebi Bolnisi. Their next title came in 2002, in an all Batumi final with the 1st team going up against the 2nd team, the 1st XV were victorious 27–10.

=== European Rugby Continental Shield ===
Batumi were invited to the 2017–18 European Rugby Continental Shield, they were seeded in Pool B with Italian sides Calvisano and Petrarca, as well as Portuguese side CDUL. With 2 wins and 2 losses Batumi finished second in their group advancing to the Pool play offs, being beaten by the Timișoara Saracens 32–18 over two matches.

=== Rugby Europe Super Cup ===
After winning the Didi 10 in the 2021–22 season, RC Batumi were invited to the 2022 Rugby Europe Super Cup to replace the two Russian sides after Enisei-STM and Lokomotiv Penza were suspended form the tournament.

Their first match was a Georgian derby against the reigning champions Black Lion, Batumi falling to a 29–3 loss. Their first win came on the 24 September against that years runners-up, beating Israeli side Tel Aviv Heat 19–11. They finished 3rd in the Eastern Conference missing out on qualification for the semifinals. They did not go on to feature in the 2023 edition of the competition.

== Current squad ==
=== Players ===
RC Batumi squad for the 2024–25 Didi 10 season
==== Props ==== : (Georgia (country)) Saba Surmanidze; (Georgia (country)) Giga Kobakhidze; (Georgia (country)) Aleko Shamilishvili; (Georgia (country)) Iona Pirtskhalava; (Georgia (country)) Rezo Margalitadze; (Georgia (country)) Raindi Doghania; (Georgia (country)) Luka Putkaradze; ==== Hookers ==== : (Georgia (country)) Vazha Tagauri; (Georgia (country)) Tornike Gabelaia; ==== Locks ==== : (Georgia (country)) Giga Julukhadze; (Georgia (country)) Gaga Arabuli; (Georgia (country)) Lasha Pofkhadze; (Georgia (country)) Nukri Ferselidze; (Georgia (country)) Giorgi Sharvashidze	==== Back-row ==== : (Georgia (country)) Giorgi Iremadze; (Georgia (country)) Giorgi Shukakidze; (Georgia (country)) **Giorgi Tkhilaishvili**; (Georgia (country)); (Georgia (country)) Vano Putkaradze; ==== Scrum-halves ==== : (Georgia (country)) Giorgi Margalitadze; (Georgia (country)) Archil Turmanidze; ==== Fly-halves ==== : (Georgia (country)) Buba Nozadze; (Georgia (country)) **Rezi Djintchvelashvili**; ==== Centres ==== : (Georgia (country)) Kavekini Tabu; (Georgia (country)) Giorgi Tsiklauri; (Georgia (country)) Otar Metreveli; (Georgia (country)) Nika Dumbadze; ==== Outside Backs ==== : (Georgia (country)) Zura Ninidze; (Georgia (country)) Peter Williams; (Georgia (country)) Roma Makhatadze; (Georgia (country)) Vazha Mikadze; (Georgia (country)); (Georgia (country)) **Alexander Todua**; (Georgia (country)) David Trapaidze
Key: Senior 15s internationally capped players are listed in **bold**.; * denotes players qualified to play for Georgia on dual nationality or residency grounds.; † denotes players dual-registered with Black Lion.

=== Staff ===
Role	Name
Manager	(Georgia (country)) Gigi Khocholava
Director of Rugby	(Georgia (country)) Gela Kobuladze
Head Coach	(Georgia (country)) Irakli Ninidze
Assistant Coach	(Georgia (country)) Davit Gugushvili
Assistant Coach	(Georgia (country)) Paliko Jimsheladze
Physical Trainer	(Georgia (country)) Giorgi Chkhartishvili
Video Analysis	(Georgia (country)) Irakli Bezhanidze
Team Doctor	(Georgia (country)) Paata Tsintsabadze
Physio	(Georgia (country)) Tiko Laitadze

== Record in European games ==
As of 15 August 2024

Opponent	Competition	Pld	W	D	L	PF	PA	PD
(Georgia (country)) Black Lion	Rugby Europe Super Cup	2	0	0	2	3	66	+63
(Germany) Heidelberger RK	European Rugby Continental Shield	1	1	0	0	33	16	+17
(Romania) Romanian Wolves	Rugby Europe Super Cup	2	1	0	1	40	33	+7
(Italy) Rugby Rovigo Delta	European Rugby Continental Shield	1	0	0	1	27	31	-4
(Israel) Tel Aviv Heat	Rugby Europe Super Cup	2	1	0	1	27	36	-9
(Romania) Timișoara Saracens	European Rugby Continental Shield	3	1	0	2	38	49	-11
(Italy) Rugby Viadana	European Rugby Continental Shield	1	0	0	1	31	27	-4

== Notable players ==
=== Internationals ===
- (Georgia (country)) Giorgi Tkhilaishvili
- (Georgia (country)) Alexander Todua
- (Georgia (country)) Lasha Khmaladze
- (Georgia (country)) Luka Matkava
- (Georgia (country)) Anzor Sitchinava
- (Georgia (country)) Saba Shubitidze
- (Georgia (country)) Niko Aptsiauri

Rugby World Cup
Tournament	Players selected	Georgia players
1987–2011	0	–
2015	1	Giorgi Tkhilaishvili
2019	3	Giorgi Tkhilaishvili, Alexander Todua, Lasha Khmaladze
2023	3	Luka Matkava, Alexander Todua, Lasha Khmaladze

== Honours ==
- Didi 10
  - Champions: (5) 1998–99, 2001–02, 2018–19, 2021–22, 2024-25
  - Runners-up: (6) 1997–98, 2000–01, 2008–09, 2016–17, 2020–21, 2022–23

== See also ==
- Category:RC Batumi players
- Didi 10
