= Giorgi Begadze =

Georgian rugby union player

- Born: 4 March 1986 (age 40) Tbilisi, Georgia
- Height: 1.80 m (5 ft 11 in)
- Weight: 81 kg (12 st 11 lb; 179 lb)

Rugby union career
Senior career
| Years | Team | Apps | (Points) |
- RC Kochebi Bolnisi
- Correct as of 4 September 2015
International career
| Years | Team | Apps | (Points) |
| 2011– | Georgia | 65 | (0) |
- Correct as of 16 September 2019

Giorgi Begadze (born 4 March 1986) is a Georgian rugby union player who plays as a scrum-half for RC Kochebi Bolnisi in the Georgia Championship and the Georgia national team.
