= Giorgi Tkhilaishvili =

Georgia international rugby union player

- Born: 8 April 1991 (age 35) Kobuleti Georgia
- Height: 1.80 m (5 ft 11 in)
- Weight: 103 kg (16 st 3 lb; 227 lb)

Rugby union career
- Position: Flanker
Senior career
Years	Team	Apps	(Points)
until 2011	Batumi RC		
2011–2014	Armia Tbilisi		
Aug. 2014	Northampton (trial)		
Oct. 2014	Leicester (trial)		
2014-	Batumi RC		
- Correct as of 4 September 2015
International career
Years	Team	Apps	(Points)
2012–	Georgia	51	(45)
- Correct as of 16 September 2019

Giga Tkhilaishvili (born 8 April 1991) is a Georgian rugby union player. His position is flanker, and he currently plays for Batumi RC in the Georgia Championship and the Georgia national team.

== Career ==
Giga Tkhilaishvili played for Batumi RC in the Georgian championship. After some strong performances, he was called by the U20 national team to play the JWRT. Few months later he joined the 2011 champion of Georgia, Armia Tbilisi. He made his debut for Georgia national team against Ukraine in June 2012. In October, he had a one-month trial for the Premiership's side Leicester Tigers, after a prior trial with Northampton. He impressed in defense with Leicester A in the A-League, but his inability to speak English and his absence from international matches led to him not receiving a long-term contract.
