= Beka Bitsadze =

Georgia international rugby union player

- Born: 24 March 1991 (age 35) Tbilisi, Georgia
- Height: 1.93 m (6 ft 4 in)
- Weight: 105 kg (16 st 7 lb; 231 lb)

Rugby union career
- Position: Number 8
Amateur team(s)
Years	Team	Apps	(Points)
2010–2014	RC Army Tbilisi		
Senior career
Years	Team	Apps	(Points)
2014–2015	FC Locomotive Tbilisi		
2015–2017	Chambérien	40	(40)
2017–2019	RC Narbonne	21	(10)
2020–2021	Baia Mare		
2021–	Niort		
- Correct as of 16 November 2018
International career
Years	Team	Apps	(Points)
2013–	Georgia	27	(30)
- Correct as of 28 June 2015

Beka Bitsadze (born 24 March 1991) is a Georgian rugby union number 8 playing for Niort. He has played for the Georgia national team twenty times.

== Biography ==
Bitsadze was born in Tbilisi and played for the youth Rugby Club Iveria under Mikheil Chachua before moving up to play in the Georgia Championship for RC Army Tbilisi (2010–2014), then in the National League for FC Locomotive Tbilisi (2014–2015).
