= Khvamli Tbilisi =

Georgian rugby union club, based in Tbilisi

- Full name: Tbilisi Gldani-Nadzaladevi Sports Centre RC Khvamli
- Union: Georgia Rugby Union
- Founded: 2011; 15 years ago
- Location: Gldani-Nadzaladevi, Tbilisi, Georgia
- Ground: Mukhiani Arena (Capacity: 1 500)
- President: Davit Rurua
- Coach: Davit Tskhvediani
- League: Didi 10
- 2023–24: 5th

Official website
- stat.rugby.ge

Khvamli Tbilisi (officially Tbilisi Gldani-Nadzaladevi Sports Centre RC Khvamli) is a professional rugby union club from Tbilisi, Georgia. They compete in the Georgian Didi 10.

== History ==
They were formed in 2011, based in Tbilisi. Beginning in the regional leagues, in 2019-20 they topped Regional League East table however the Play off matches were never played. They were promoted in the Georgian First League that season. They earned promotion to the Georgian top flight in 2022, winning the Georgian First League beating Tao Samtskhe-Javakheti.

== Club honours ==
=== Major honours ===
- Georgian Regional League East
  - Champions: (1) 2019-20
- Georgian First League
  - Champions: (1) 2021-22

=== Age grade ===
- Under-18 Championship
  - Runner-up: (1) 2021
- Under-16 Championship
  - Runners-up: (2) 2019, 2023

== Squad ==
=== Club staff ===
Role	Name
Manager	(Georgia (country)) Nugzar Malaghuradze
President	(Georgia (country)) Dato Rurua
Head Coach	(Georgia (country)) Davit Tshvediani
Assistant Coach	(Georgia (country)) Erekle Feradze
Assistant Coach	(Georgia (country)) Irakli Maskharashvili
Assistant Coach	(Georgia (country)) Giorgi Tsutskiridze
Doctor	(Georgia (country)) Kakhaber Katsitadze

=== Notable former players ===
The following are players which have represented their countries while playing for Khvamli Tbilisi:

- (Georgia (country)) Luka Matkava
- (Georgia (country)) Nikoloz Aptsiauri
- (Georgia (country)) Mikheil Gachechiladze
- (Georgia (country)) Sergo Abramashvili
- (Georgia (country)) Davit Niniashvili

== See also ==
- Rugby Union in Georgia
