= TBS Universiteti RC =

TBS Universiteti Rugby Club
- Founded: 1962
- Location: Tbilisi, Georgia
- President: Lasha Chkhaidze
- Coach(es): Lasha Tavberidze
- League(s): Georgia Championship
Team kit

TBS Universiteti RC is a Georgian semi-professional rugby club from Tbilisi, who plays in the Didi 10, the first division of Georgian rugby.
