= Irakli Machkhaneli =

Georgia international rugby union player

- Born: 18 July 1981 (age 45) Tbilisi, Georgia
- Height: 6 ft 1 in (1.85 m)
- Weight: 220 lb (100 kg)

Rugby union career
- Position: Wing
Senior career
Years	Team	Apps	(Points)
2012-14	Armazi Tbilisi	??	
2011-12	Saint-Étienne	12	(35)
2010-11	Mâcon	14	(10)
2009-10	Saint-Étienne	21	(25)
2008-09	Agen	8	(5)
2007-08	Stade Montois	15	(15)
2005-07	Béziers	21	(0)
2001-05	Armazi Tbilisi		
International career
Years	Team	Apps	(Points)
2002-14	Georgia	73	(115)
Coaching career
- Years: Team
- 2014-: Georgia (Asst. Coach)

Irakli Machkhaneli (born 18 June 1981) is a retired Georgian rugby union player who played as a wing.

He played in France for AS Béziers (2005/06-2006/07), Stade Montois (2007/08), SU Agen (2008/09), CA Saint-Étienne (2009/10), in the Pro D2, Mâcon (2010/11) and once again CA Saint-Étienne (2011/12-2012/13), in the Fédérale 1. He moved back to Georgia, where he played for RC Armazi Tbilisi, in Georgia Championship, since 2013/14. It was with Armazi Tbilisi that he started is rugby union career, where he was noticed by the Georgian coach and was selected for the 2001–02 European Nations Cup First Division. He made his debut on 3 February 2002 against the Netherlands.

He has 73 caps for Georgia since 2002, with 23 tries scored, 115 points on aggregate. He is one of the two top tries scorers for the "Lelos". He was called for the 2003 Rugby World Cup, where he played in all the four games, the 2007 Rugby World Cup, playing in three games and scoring a try, and the 2011 Rugby World Cup, playing in two games. He is the current captain for the "Lelos".

In 2014 he retired, with his last cap coming against Tonga on 8 November 2014. Since then he has been assistant coach for the team, specializing with the backs.
