= Tbilisi Caucasians =

- Union: Georgian Rugby Union
- Founded: 2014
- Region: Tbilisi, Georgia
- Ground(s): Stadium Avchala
- Coach(es): Levan Maisashvili
- League(s): European Rugby Challenge Cup

Tbilisi Caucasians (Georgian: თბილისის კავკასიელები T’bilisis Kavkasielebi) were a Georgian rugby union team formed to compete in the European Rugby Challenge Cup. The team competed in the qualifying stage of the 2014–15 European Rugby Challenge Cup against the Italian side, Rovigo Delta. The players were picked from the Georgian domestic rugby championship and the head coach was Levan Maisashvili.

== Qualifying Competition ==
20 September 2014
16:00 CEST

| Rovigo Delta (Italy) | 22–18 | (Georgia (country)) Tbilisi Caucasians |
| | Report |

Stadio Mario Battaglini
Referee: Lloyd Lynton (SRU)

27 September 2014
17:00 GET

| Tbilisi Caucasians (Georgia (country)) | 21–24 | (Italy) Rovigo Delta |
| | Report |

Stadium Avchala
Referee: Matthew Carley (RFU)

== See also ==
- Georgian national rugby union team
- Rugby union in Georgia
