= Davit Niniashvili =

Georgian rugby union player

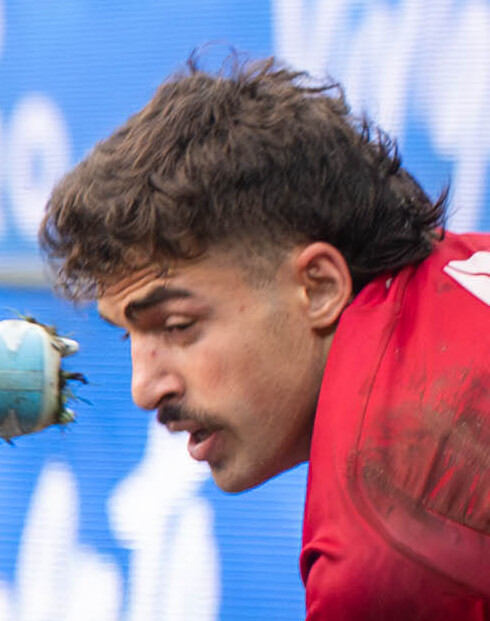
- Born: Davit Niniashvili; 14 July 2002 (age 24) Tbilisi, Georgia
- Height: 1.86 m (6 ft 1 in)
- Weight: 90 kg (14 st 2 lb; 198 lb)

Rugby union career
- Position(s): Full-back, Wing, Fly-half
Youth career
- 2010–2019: Khvamli Tbilisi
Senior career
Years	Team	Apps	(Points)
2019–2021	Khvamli Tbilisi	9	(113)
2021–2025	Lyon	76	(139)
2025–	Stade Rochelais	23	(35)
- Correct as of 28 October 2025
International career
Years	Team	Apps	(Points)
2019	Georgia U18	4	(9)
2020–	Georgia	48	(114)
- Correct as of 20 July 2025

Davit Niniashvili (born 14 July 2002) is a Georgian rugby union player. He plays as a winger or fullback for French Top 14 club, Stade Rochelais. Niniashvili also represents the Georgian National Team. His coach presents him as "a promising player with good skills".

== Career ==
Davit Niniashvili was named in the starting line-up for the first time at 2020 Rugby Europe Championship against Russia. He scored his first international try against Russia at 2021 Rugby Europe Championship

In 2021, he signed a three-year contract with Lyon. He made his debut in the Top 14 on September 18, 2021, against Perpignan. Niniashvili played a crucial role in Lyon's success, helping the team win the Challenge Cup, their first European title in history. His impressive performances caught the attention of the rugby world, and he was included in the Barbarians squad to face England in June 2022, despite having only 11 test caps at the time. With his talent and potential, Niniashvili is expected to have a bright future in both club and international rugby.

In September 2023, Niniashvili was named in Georgia's 2023 Rugby World Cup squad. He started all four games, scoring a try against Wales.

== Honours ==
Lyon

- Challenge Cup: 2021–22

Georgia

- U18 European Rugby Championship: 2019
- European Rugby Championship: 2021, 2022, 2023, 2024
- Personal
- Midi Olympique's Oscars Midol 2023
