= Giorgi Babunashvili =

Georgian rugby union player

- Full name: Giorgi Babunashvili
- Born: 15 November 1995 (age 30) Kutaisi, Georgia
- Height: 1.84 m (6 ft 1/2 in)
- Weight: 82 kg (12 st 13 lb; 181 lb)

Rugby union career
- Position: Fly-half
- Current team: AIA Kutaisi/The Black Lion
Senior career
Years	Team	Apps	(Points)
2013-2016	Bagrati Kutaisi	??	(??)
2016-	AIA Kutaisi	??	(??)
2021-	The Black Lion	23	(122)
- Correct as of 29 August 2023
International career
Years	Team	Apps	(Points)
2013-2015	Georgia under-20	8	(0)
2021-	Georgia	6	(9)
- Correct as of 29 August 2023
National sevens team
Years	Team		Comps
2016-2019	Georgia		4 (65)
- Correct as of 29 August 2023

Giorgi Babunashvili (born 15 November 1995) is a Georgian rugby union player who plays as a fly-half for AIA Kutaisi in the Didi 10 and The Black Lion in Rugby Europe Super Cup's eastern division. He was playing for Georgia 7s until 2019. In 2021 he called in Georgia national rugby union team.

== Biography ==
Giorgi Babunashvili came to prominence in 2013 with Bagrati Kutaisi, a Georgian second division team. With his team, he competed in a promotion play-off for the first division, which he lost. His good performances allowed him to join the main club in Kutaisi, RC AIA, during the off-season. At the end of the season, he was included in the Georgia Under-20 team for the World Junior Trophy, which he competed in again in 2015.

In 2017, he joined the Georgia Rugby Sevens team for the Seven's Grand Prix Series. In 2017–2018, he scored over 126 points with AIA in the Georgian championship, but had to miss the finals due to injury. He was named in the league's All-Star team for the year as a fly-half.

In 2019, he returned to the sevens squad for the tournament in Russia. In 2021, he was named in the Georgia team. On the bench against Spain and Portugal, he did not play. He had to wait until the match against Russia to win his first cap.
