= Kazbegi (disambiguation) =

Kazbegi (Georgian: ყაზბეგი qazbegi) may refer to:

== Places ==
- Kazbegi, a former name of Stepantsminda, a town in Georgia
- Mount Kazbek, in the Caucasus
- Kazbegi Municipality, a municipality in Georgia

== People ==
- Kazbegi family, a noble family in Georgia
- Alexander Kazbegi, Georgian writer
- Kazbegi, Kazbek, or Kazi-Bek, a male given name in the Caucasus
