= Irakli Natriashvili =

- Born: Iuri Natriashvili; 25 January 1984 (age 42) Baghdati, Georgia
- Height: 180 cm (5 ft 11 in)
- Weight: 105 kg (16 st 7 lb; 231 lb)

Rugby union career
- Position: Hooker
Senior career
Years	Team	Apps	(Points)
2011	Saint Junien		
2011–2013	Brive	48	(15)
2014–2015	Tulle	11	(0)
2015	Clermont	3	(0)
2015–2016	Toulon	2	(5)
2016–	CSM Baia Mare	11	(0)
International career
Years	Team	Apps	(Points)
2006–2015	Georgia	40	(20)

Irakli Natriashvili (Georgian: ირაკლი ნატრიაშვილი) (born 25 January 1984 in Baghdati, Georgia) is a Georgian rugby union player. He plays Hooker for Georgia on international level. Natriashvili also plays for French club, Brive in the Pro D2 and Top 14 competition. He has also featured in a Romanian club Farul Constanţa and played for Armia in the Georgia Championship, in 2011 he featured in Fédérale 1 club, St Junien.
Natriashvili played his first game with Georgia on 29 April 2006 against Ukraine in the European Nations Cup, at the age of just 21. However Natriashvili hasn't played a world cup yet, missing selection for Georgia's squad at the 2007 and 2011 Rugby World Cup.
Playing for the club Farul Constanţa till the 2010, he then signed for Brive in late 2011. Natriashvili still plays for the side, competing in the Pro D2 and Top 14 competitions. He also played in the Georgia Championship, with Armia.
