= Ares Kutaisi =

Georgian rugby union club, based in Kutaisi

- Union: Georgia Rugby Union
- Founded: 2015; 11 years ago
- Location: Kutaisi, Georgia
- Ground: Aia Arena (Capacity: 4,860)
- President: Giorgi Chikhladze
- Coach: Sergo Freudze
- League: Didi 10
- 2023–24: 4th

Official website
- stat.rugby.ge

Ares Kutaisi (officially Aa(i)p Rugby Club "Ares" Kutaisi) is a professional rugby union club from Kutaisi, Georgia. They compete in the Georgian Didi 10.

== History ==
Founded in 2015 Ares Kutaisi play at the Aia Arena, sharing the stadium with RC Aia Kutaisi, Bagrat Kutaisi and RC Dinosaurs Tskaltubo. They won the Georgian Regional League in 2016, winning promotion to the Georgian First League. They won the league in 2019, however, they were not promoted until 2020 when again they topped the table winning 15 out of 15 games before the season was cancelled due to the COVID-19 pandemic.

== Honours ==
=== Georgian competitions ===
- Georgian First League
  - Winners (2): 2018–19, 2019–20
- Georgian Regional League
  - Winners (1): 2015–16

== Squad ==
=== Club staff ===
Role	Name
Manager/President	(Georgia (country)) Giorgi Chikhladze
Head Coach	(Georgia (country)) Sergo Freudze
Assistant Coach	(Georgia (country)) Zura Goglichadze
Assistant Coach	(Georgia (country)) Giorgi Tsirekidze
Strength & Conditioning Coach	(Georgia (country)) Tazo Laghadze
Physio	(Georgia (country)) Murtazi Gureshidze
Doctor	(Georgia (country)) Juba Vardanidze
Video Analysis	(Georgia (country)) Teimuraz Gorgidze

== See also ==
- Rugby Union in Georgia
