= Nikoloz Aptsiauri =

Georgian rugby union player

- Born: 24 September 1992 (age 34) Georgia
- Height: 184 cm (6 ft 0 in)
- Weight: 94 kg (207 lb; 14 st 11 lb)

Rugby union career
- Position: Flanker
- Current team: Black Lion
Senior career
Years	Team	Apps	(Points)
2021–2023	Black Lion	5	(20)
- Correct as of 10 April 2022
International career
Years	Team	Apps	(Points)
2022–	Georgia	1	(0)
- Correct as of 10 April 2022
National sevens team
Years	Team		Comps
2015–2019	Georgia Sevens		9
- Correct as of 10 April 2022

Nikoloz Aptsiauri (born 24 September 1992) is a Georgian rugby union player who plays for Black Lion in the 2022 Currie Cup First Division as a flanker. He was named in the Black Lion squad for the 2022 Currie Cup First Division. He has also represented Georgia internationally in both the 15-man code and in rugby sevens.
