= RC Armazi Marneuli =

Georgian rugby union club, based in Marneuli

- Founded: 2003; 23 years ago
- Location: Marneuli, Georgia
- Ground: Armazi Stadium (Capacity: 4,000)
- President: Giorgi Soselia
- Coach(es): Irakli Machkhaneli (Head Coach), Ilia Maissuradze (Scrum Coach) (U-20 Head Coach), Lado kilasonia (Backs Coach)(U-20 Backs Coach)), Paliko Jimsheladze (Strategy Coach) (7's coach)
- League: Didi 10
- 2018-19: 3
Team kit

RC Armazi is a Georgian professional rugby union club from Marneuli, who plays in the Didi 10, the first division of Georgian rugby. Rugby club Armazi was founded in Tbilisi.

== Notable former players ==
- Irakli Abuseridze
- Irakli Machkhaneli
- Davit Kiknadze
- Vasil Lobzhanidze
- Lasha Tabidze
- Davit Vartaniani
- Irakli Tskhadadze
- Muraz Giorgadze
- Nika Khatiashvili
