= Aia Arena (Kutaisi) =

Rugby Stadium in The Republic of Georgia

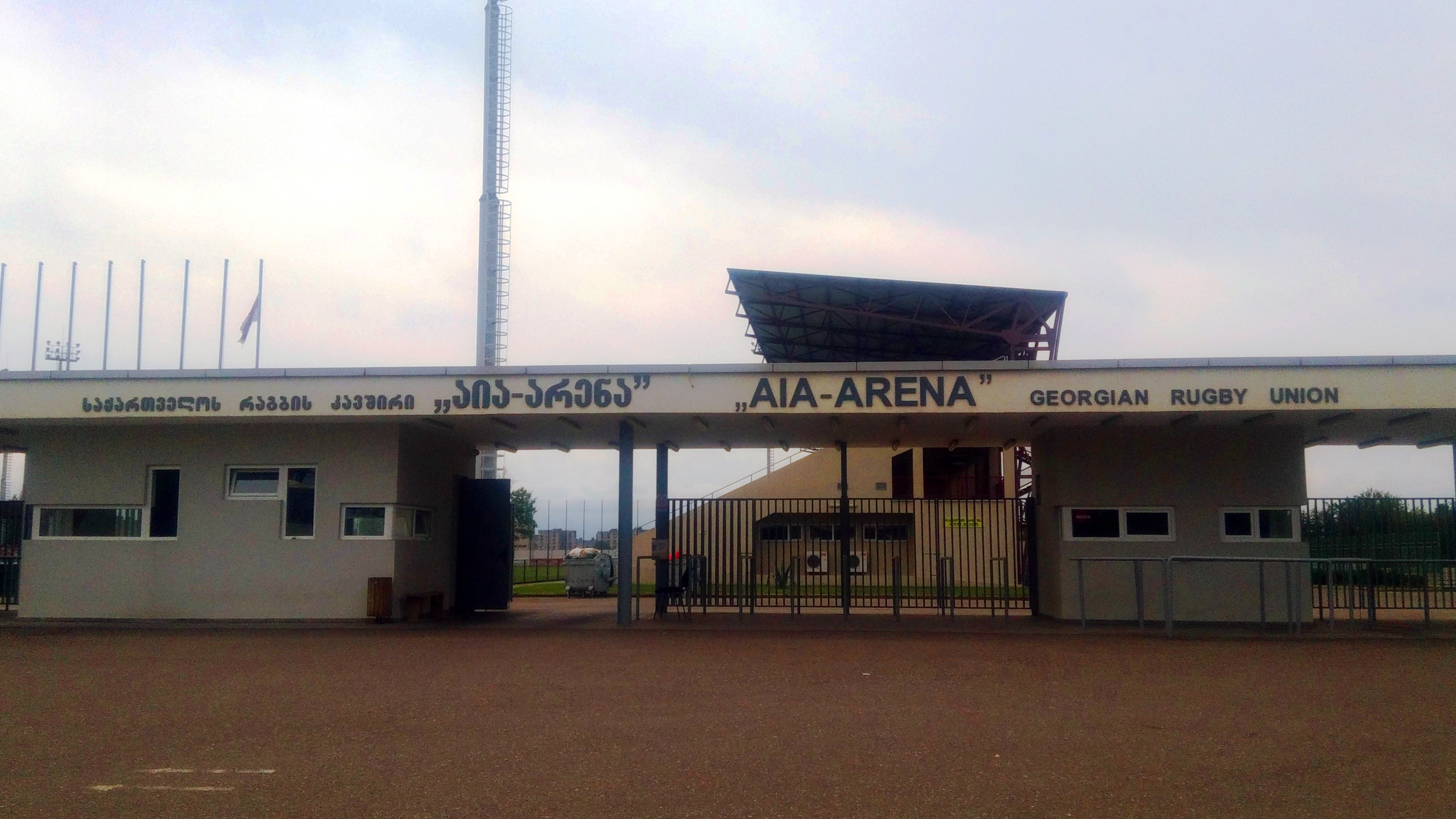
- Interactive map of Aia Arena
- Full name: Aia Arena
- Location: Kutaisi, Georgia
- Coordinates: 42°14′29″N 42°41′9″E
- Capacity: 4,860
- Surface: Grass

Construction
- Groundbreaking: 2011
- Opened: 2015
- Cost: 11m GEL

Tenants
- RC Aia Kutaisi (Didi 10); Ares Kutaisi (Didi 10); Bagrat Kutaisi (Georgian First League); RC Dinosaurs Tskaltubo (Georgian First League)

The Aia Arena is a stadium located in Kutaisi. It is the home stadium of RC Aia Kutaisi, Ares Kutaisi, RC Dinosaurs Tskaltubo and Bagrat Kutaisi. The Aia Arena has a capacity of 4,860.
