= RC Jiki Gori =

Georgian rugby union club, based in Gori

Rugby Club Jiki Gori
- Nickname: Jiki/Jikebi (Panther/Panthers)
- Founded: 2001; 25 years ago
- Location: Gori, Georgia
- Ground: Gori Rugby Stadium (Capacity: 3,000)
- Chairman: Soso Maisuradze
- Coach: Paliko Jimsheladze
- League: Didi 10
Team kit

RC Jiki Gori is a Georgian professional rugby union club from Gori, who plays in the Didi 10, the top division of Georgian rugby.

== Notable players ==
- (Georgia (country)) Tornike Jalaghonia
