= RC Aia Kutaisi =

Georgian rugby union club, based in Kutaisi

(Georgia (country)) Rugby Club Aia Kutaisi
- Full name: Rugby Club Aia Kutaisi
- Founded: 15 October 1959; 66 years ago
- Location: Kutaisi, Georgia
- Ground: Aia Arena (Capacity: 4,860)
- President: Giorgi *Gia* Gorgaslidze
- Coach: Giorgi Nemsadze
- Captain: Giorgi Babunashvili
- League: Didi 10
- 2023–24: 1st

RC Aia Kutasi is a Georgian rugby union team. Aia Kutasi was one of the best teams of the Soviet Union, holding three national titles, in 1987, 1988 and 1989. Since the dissolution of the Soviet Union, Aia Kutaisi has been one of the best teams of Georgia; they held 10 national titles, both as a Soviet republic and as an independent country.

== Honours ==
=== Georgia ===
- Georgia Championship
  - (gold) Champions (10): 1969, 1978, 1982, 1983–84, 1986 ,1990, 1991, 1995, 2020–21, 2023-24
  - (silver) Silver medalists (6): 1988 ,1992, 1997, 2011, 2017-18, 2024-25
  - (bronze) Bronze medalists (10): 1971, 1973, 1974, 1975, 1976, 1977 ,1993, 1994, 2012-13, 2025-26
- Georgia Cup
  - (silver) Finalists (4): 1979, 1980, 1991-92, 2006

=== USSR ===
- USSR Championship
  - (gold) Champions (3): 1987, 1988, 1989
  - (silver) Silver medalists (1): 1984
  - (bronze) Bronze medalists (1): 1985
- USSR Cup
  - (gold) Winners (2): 1987, 1990

== Stadium ==
They share their ground with Ares Kutaisi, RC Dinosaurs Tskaltubo and Bagrat Kutaisi all the side playing at the Aia Arena, which was built in 2015.

== Current squad ==
RC Aia Kutaisi squad for the 2024–25 Didi 10 season
=== Front-row === : (Georgia (country)) Bachuk Baratashvili; (Georgia (country)) Aleko Gigashvili; (Georgia (country)) Gigi Chumburidze; (Georgia (country)) Giorgi Bakradze; (Georgia (country)) Giorgi Kimutsadze; (Georgia (country)) Luka Shengelia; (Georgia (country)) Mate Oboladze; (Georgia (country)) Omar Jangavadze; (Georgia (country)) Peter Jincharadze; (Georgia (country)) Saba Eremeishvili; (Georgia (country)) Sana Khonelidze; === Locks === : (Georgia (country)) Giorgi Gabriadze; (Georgia (country)) Duba Zibzibadze; (Georgia (country)) Vakhtang Sharvashidze; (Fiji) Sitiveni Iambak	=== Back-row === : (Georgia (country)) Luka Gabunia; (Georgia (country)) Genadu Kudava; (Georgia (country)) Giorgi Nutsubidze; (Georgia (country)) Davit Vardanidze; (Georgia (country)) Ilia Gabisonia; (Georgia (country)) Luka Chaava; (Fiji) Jiuta Nbatrerenga; === Halfbacks === : (Georgia (country)) **Giorgi Babunashvili** (c); (Georgia (country)) Guja Makhareishvili; (Georgia (country)) Davit Kldiashvili; (Georgia (country)) Zurab Khutsidze; (Georgia (country)) Lado Tkabladze; (Georgia (country)) Nika Ghlont; (Georgia (country)) Otar Kldiashvili	=== Centres === : (Georgia (country)) Irakli Simsive; (Georgia (country)) Anzor Saralidze; (Georgia (country)) Givi Kashia; (Georgia (country)) Giorgi Freudze; (Georgia (country)) Luka Chkaberidze; === Outside Backs === : (Georgia (country)) Emzar Mindiashvili; (Georgia (country)) Otar Metreveli; (Georgia (country)) Temur Kokhodze; (Fiji) Timothy Mbola
Key: Senior 15s internationally capped players are listed in **bold**.; * denotes players qualified to play for Georgia on dual nationality or residency grounds.; † denotes players dual-registered with Black Lion.

== Notable former players ==
- (Georgia (country)) Zurab Zhvania

== See also ==
- Georgia national rugby union team
- Georgia Rugby Union
- Rugby union in Georgia
- Georgia Championship
- Georgia Cup
- Georgia at the Rugby World Cup
