= RC Rustavi Kharebi =

Georgian rugby union club, based in Rustavi

Rugby Club Rustavi Kharebi
- Nickname: Kharebi (The Bulls)
- Location: Rustavi, Georgia
- Ground: Kharebi Arena (Capacity: 3,000)
- Coach: Levan Mgeladze
- League: Didi 10
Team kit

RC Rustavi Kharebi is a Georgian professional rugby union club from Rustavi, who plays in the Didi 10, the first division of Georgian rugby.
