= RC Kochebi Bolnisi =

Georgian rugby union club, based in Bolnisi

(Georgia (country)) RC Qochebi Bolnisi
- Full name: Rugby Club Qochebi Bolnisi
- Founded: 1959; 67 years ago, as Georgia Polytechnical Institute (GPI) in Tbilisi
- Location: Bolnisi, Georgia
- Ground: Tamaz Stepania Stadium (Capacity: 3 000)
- League: Didi 10

Rugby Club Kochebi Bolnisi is a Georgian semi-professional rugby union club from Bolnisi, who plays in the Georgia Championship, the first division of Georgian rugby.

== Achievements ==
- Didi 10:
  - Winners (3): 1997, 1998, 2007
  - Runner-up (4): 1996, 1999, 2000, 2003
  - Third Place (4): 2002, 2006, 2008, 2010
- Georgia Cup:
  - Winners (1): 2007

=== Current Georgia Elite Squad ===
- Giorgi Begadze

=== International honours ===
- (Georgia (country)) Sandro Esakia
- (Georgia (country)) Giorgi Khositashvili
- (Georgia (country)) Rati Urushadze
- (Georgia (country)) Giorgi Tsiklauri
- (Ukraine) Jaba Malaguradze
- (Georgia (country)) Giorgi Begadze
- (Georgia (country)) Temur Sokhadze
- (Georgia (country)) Karlen Asieshvili

== See also ==
- Rugby union in Georgia
