= RC Academy Tbilisi =

Georgian rugby union club, based in Tbilisi

Rugby Club Academy Tbilisi
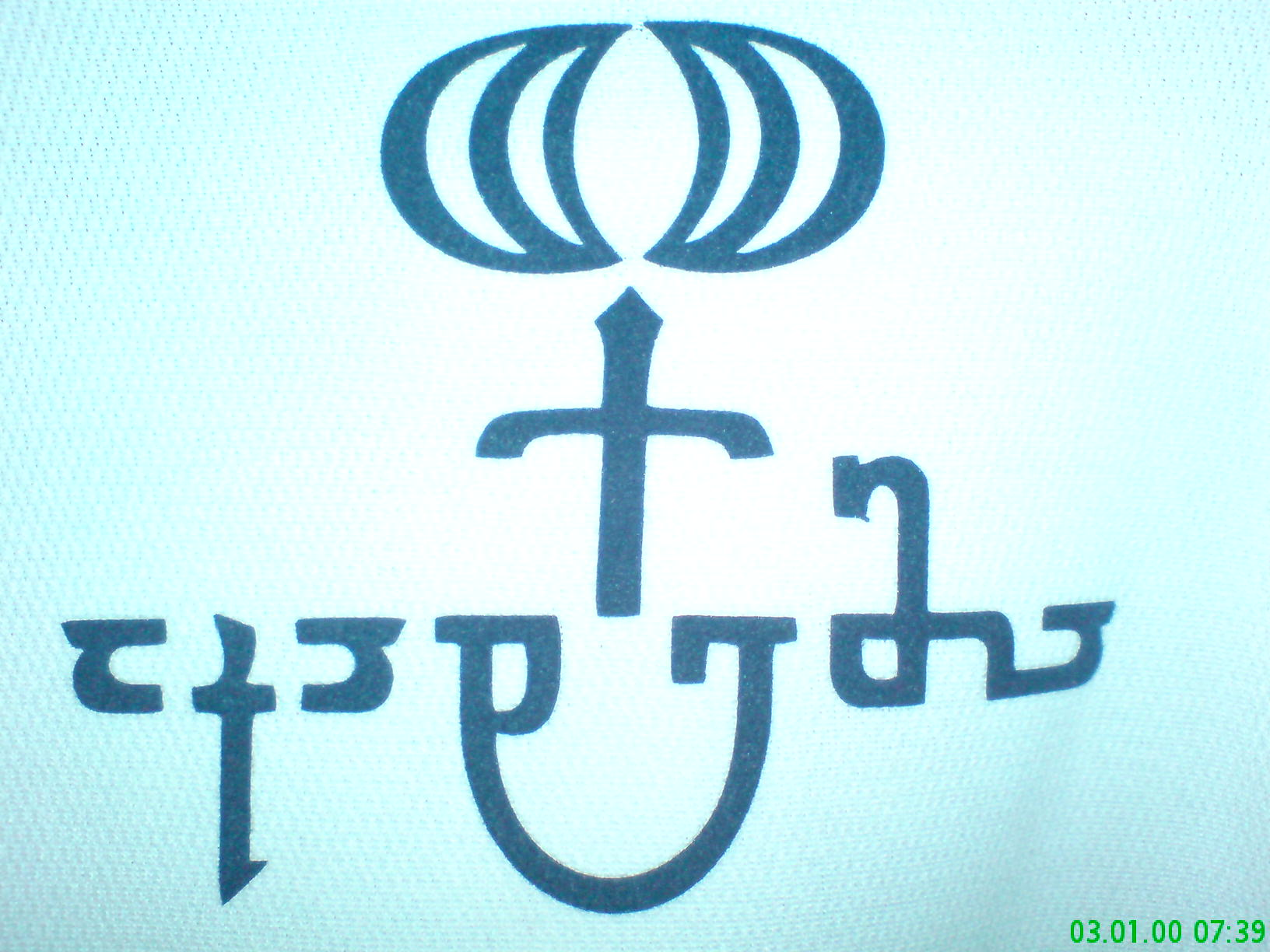
- Nickname: Akademia
- Founded: 1984; 42 years ago
- Location: Tbilisi, Georgia
- Ground: Nutsubidze Rugby Stadium (Capacity: 2,000)
- Chairman: Giorgi Ghlonti
- Coach: Levan Datunashvili
- League: Georgian First League
- 2023–24: 10th (relegated)
Team kit

RC Academy Tbilisi is a Georgian professional rugby union club from Tbilisi, who plays in the Georgian First League, the second division of Georgian rugby. The club was founded in 1983.
