= RC Army Tbilisi =

Georgian rugby union club, based in Tbilisi

(Georgia (country)) RC Armia Tbilisi
- Full name: Rugby Club Armia Tbilisi
- Founded: 1977
- Location: Tbilisi, Georgia
- Ground: Avchala Stadium (Capacity: 2,500)
- League: Didi 10

Rugby Club Armia Tbilisi is a Georgian professional rugby union club from Tbilisi, who plays in the Georgia Championship, the first division of Georgian rugby. The team was Champion in 2011.

== Achievements ==
- Georgia Championship:
  - Winners (1): 2011
  - Runner-up (1): 2013
  - Third Place (2): 1998, 2000
- Georgia Cup:
  - Winners (2): 2011, 2012

=== Current Georgia Elite squad ===
- Shalva Mamukashvili
- Giorgi Tkhilaishvili
- Beka Bitsadze
- Giorgi Shkinin

=== International honours ===
- (Georgia (country)) Shalva Mamukashvili
- (Georgia (country)) Tariel Donadze
- (Spain) Davit Gurgenadze
- (Georgia (country)) Kakhaber Uchava
- (Georgia (country)) Giorgi Kalmakhelidze
- (Georgia (country)) Lasha Tavartkiladze
- (Georgia (country)) Giorgi Tkhilaishvili
- (Georgia (country)) Beka Bitsadze
- (Georgia (country)) Zviad Maisuradze
- (Georgia (country)) Mamuka Ninidze
- (Georgia (country)) Irakli Chkhikvadze
- (Georgia (country)) Giorgi Jimsheladze
- (Georgia (country)) Giorgi Elizbarashvili
- (Georgia (country)) Giorgi Shkinin

== See also ==
- Rugby union in Georgia
