= Georgian Rugby Union =

Rugby union governing body in the nation of Georgia

საქართველოს რაგბის კავშირი
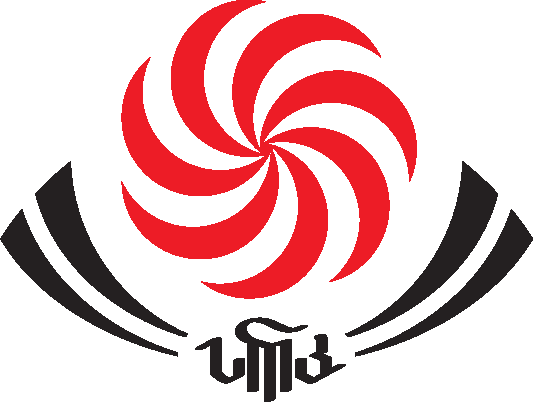
- Sport: Rugby union
- Founded: 1964
- World Rugby affiliation: 1992
- Rugby Europe affiliation: 1992
- President: David Kacharava
- Men's coach: Richard Cockerill
- Website: www.rugby.ge

The Georgian Rugby Union (GRU) (Georgian: საქართველოს რაგბის კავშირი) is the governing body for the sport of rugby union in the nation of Georgia.

== History ==
Founded in 1964, it was part of the Rugby Union of the Soviet Union until 1991, with the Independent Georgian Rugby Union being established on May 27, 1991. It organizes the Georgia Championship, Georgia Cup, the Georgia national rugby union team and the Georgia XV national rugby union team. It became affiliated to World Rugby, then known as the International Rugby Football Board, in 1992. It is based in Tbilisi.

== See also ==
- Georgia national rugby union team
- Rugby union in Georgia
