= Lelo Saracens =

Georgian semi-pro rugby union club, based in Tbilisi

(Georgia (country)) Lelo Saracens
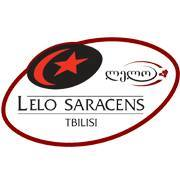
- Full name: Rugby Club Lelo Saracens
- Founded: 1969
- Location: Tbilisi, Georgia
- Ground: Lelo Arena (Capacity: 3 000)
- League: Didi 10
1st kit	2nd kit

Official website
- www.facebook.com/LeloSaracensTbilisi/

Lelo Saracens (or formally Rugby Club Lelo Tbilisi) is a Georgian semi-professional rugby union club from Tbilisi, who plays in the Georgia Championship, the first division of Georgian rugby. The team was Champion in 2004, 2009 and 2013. In July 2014, they became part of the Saracens global network, the ninth club to do so.

== Achievements ==
- Didi 10:
  - Winners (4): 2004, 2009, 2015, 2016
  - Runner-up (5): 2007, 2008, 2010, 2013, 2014
- Georgia Cup:
  - Winners (3): 2008, 2009, 2010

=== Notable former players ===
- (Georgia (country)) Viktor Kolelishvili
- (Georgia (country)) Mamuka Gorgodze
- (Georgia (country)) Lasha Khmaladze
- (Georgia (country)) Irakli Kiasashvili
- (Georgia (country)) Luka Japaridze

== See also ==
- Category:Lelo Saracens players
- Rugby union in Georgia
