= Didi 10 =

Georgian domestic rugby union club competition

Crocobet Didi 10
- Current season, competition or edition: 2025–26 Didi 10 season
- Formerly: Georgian SSR Championship
- Sport: Rugby union
- Founded: 1990; 36 years ago
- First season: 1990
- Owner: Georgia Rugby Union
- No. of teams: 10
- Country: Georgia
- Most recent champion: RC Batumi (2024-25)
- Most titles: RC Locomotive Tbilisi (10 titles)
- Broadcaster: Rugby TV (Georgian)
- Sponsor: Crocobet
- Website: rugby.ge

The Didi 10 (Georgian: დიდი 10, "Big 10") is a professional domestic rugby union club competition in Georgia. For sponsorship reasons the league is known as the Crocobet Didi 10. It is the top tier of rugby competition in the country.

== Current season ==
=== 2025-26 Didi 10 ===
- Ares Kutaisi
- Khvamli Tbilisi
- Lelo Saracens
- RC Aia Kutaisi
- RC Army Tbilisi
- RC Batumi
- RC Tsikara Tbilisi
- RC Rustavi Kharebi
- RC Gori
- RC Kazbegi

As of 16 September 2025

== List of Champions ==
Georgian SSR Championship
#	Year	Gold	Silver	Bronze
1	1967	Dinamo Tbilisi	Locomotive Tbilisi	GPI Tbilisi
2	1968	Locomotive Tbilisi	Dinamo Tbilisi	GPI Tbilisi
3	1969	Aia Kutaisi	University Tbilisi	GPI Tbilisi
4	1970	Dinamo Tbilisi	Locomotive Tbilisi	Spartak Tbilisi
5	1971	Dinamo Tbilisi	Locomotive Tbilisi	Aia Kutaisi
6	1972	Locomotive Tbilisi	Dinamo Tbilisi	Locomotive Kutaisi
7	1973	Dinamo Tbilisi	Locomotive Tbilisi	Aia Kutaisi
8	1974	Dinamo Tbilisi	Locomotive Tbilisi	Aia Kutaisi
9	1975	Dinamo Tbilisi	Locomotive Tbilisi	Aia Kutaisi
10	1976	Dinamo Tbilisi	Locomotive Tbilisi	Aia Kutaisi
11	1977	Locomotive Tbilisi	Elva Tbilisi	Aia Kutaisi
12	1978	Aia Kutaisi	Spartak Tbilisi	GPI Tbilisi
--	1979	Not Held		
13	1980	University Tbilisi	KPI Kutaisi	Tbilisi State Medical University
14	1981	Tbilisi State Medical University	University Tbilisi	-
15	1982	Aia Kutaisi	GPI Tbilisi	SKA VVS Tbilisi
16	1983–84	Aia Kutaisi	Shevardeni Tbilisi	-
17	1984–85	ZVI Tbilisi	-	
18	1986	Aia Kutaisi 2	Spartak Tbilisi	Tbilisi State Medical University
19	1987	Tbilisi State Medical University	Samtoeli Chiatura	-
20	1988	Army Tbilisi	Aia Kutaisi 2	Samtoeli Chiatura
21	1989	Aisi Kutaisi	ZVI Tbilisi	Shevardeni Tbilisi

Independent Championships of Georgia
#	Year	Gold	Silver	Bronze
1	1990	Aia Kutaisi	Elmavali	Mimino
2	1991	Aia Kutaisi	Vesta Tbilisi	Gelati
3	1992	Vesta Tbilisi	Aia Kutaisi	Chokhatauri
4	1993	Rustavi Kharebi	Shevardeni Tbilisi	Aia Kutaisi
5	1994	Tbilisi	Rustavi Kharebi	Aia Kutaisi
6	1995	Aia Kutaisi	Gumar Tbilisi	Tbilisi
7	1996	Gumar Tbilisi	Kochebi Bolnisi	Hawks
8	1997	Kochebi Bolnisi	Aia Kutaisi	Rustavi Kharebi
9	1998	Kochebi Bolnisi	Batumi Bears	ASK
10	1999	Batumi Bears	Kochebi Bolnisi	Locomotive Tbilisi
11	2000	Locomotive Tbilisi	Kochebi Bolnisi	ASK
12	2001	Locomotive Tbilisi	Batumi Bears	Kochebi Bolnisi
13	2002	Batumi Bears	Batumi Bears 2	Locomotive Tbilisi
14	2003	Locomotive Tbilisi	Kochebi Bolnisi	Academy Tbilisi
15	2004	Lelo Saracens	Academy Tbilisi	Batumi Bears
16	2005	Locomotive Tbilisi	Academy Tbilisi	Hooligana
17	2006	Locomotive Tbilisi	Dinamo Tbilisi	Kochebi Bolnisi
18	2007	Kochebi Bolnisi	Lelo Saracens	Locomotive Tbilisi
19	2008	Locomotive Tbilisi	Lelo Saracens	Kochebi Bolnisi
20	2009	Lelo Saracens	Batumi	Locomotive Tbilisi
21	2010	Locomotive Tbilisi	Lelo Saracens	Kochebi Bolnisi
22	2011	Armia Tbilisi	Aia Kutaisi	Locomotive Tbilisi
23	2012–13	Lelo Saracens	Armia Tbilisi	Aia Kutaisi
24	2013–14	Lelo Saracens	Armia Tbilisi	Locomotive Tbilisi
25	2014–15	Lelo Saracens	Locomotive Tbilisi	Kochebi Bolnisi
26	2015–16	Lelo Saracens	Locomotive Tbilisi	Jiki Gori
27	2016–17	Jiki Gori	Batumi	Lelo Saracens
28	2017–18	Locomotive Tbilisi	Aia Kutaisi	Jiki Gori
29	2018–19	Batumi	Rustavi Kharebi	Armazi Marneuli
30	2019–20	Discontinued due to the pandemic.		
31	2020–21	Aia Kutaisi	Batumi	Academy Tbilisi
32	2021–22	Batumi	Kochebi Bolnisi	Rustavi Kharebi
33	2022–23	Rustavi Kharebi	Batumi	Lelo Saracens
34	2023–24	Aia Kutaisi	Lelo Saracens	Kochebi Bolnisi
35	2024–25	Batumi	Aia Kutaisi	Kochebi Bolnisi
35	2025–26			

== Finals ==
Independent Championships of Georgia finals
Year	Date	Venue	Home	Score	Away	Referee
1990	09/12	Mikheil Meskhi Stadium	Elmavali	3 – 10	Aia Kutaisi	(Georgia (country)) Abashidze
1991	14/07	Aia Arena	Aia Kutaisi	11 – 6	Vesta Tbilisi	(Georgia (country)) Abashidze
1992	05/07	Grigol Jomartidze Stadium	Aia Kutaisi	6 – 16	Vesta Tbilisi	(Georgia (country)) Mgeladze
1997	30/11	Mikheil Meskhi Stadium	Rustavi Kharebi	20 – 8	Aia Kutaisi	(France) Declo
1998	06/12	Mikheil Meskhi Stadium	Rustavi Kharebi	30 – 10	Batumi Bears	(France) Claver
2000	05/12	Boris Paichadze Dinamo Arena	Locomotive Tbilisi	28 – 28	Kochebi Bolnisi	(Georgia (country)) Robitashvili
2001	09/12	Boris Paichadze Dinamo Arena	Locomotive Tbilisi	24 – 17	Batumi Bears	(France) Wallen
2002	14/12	Batumi Stadium	Batumi Bears	27 – 10	Batumi Bears 2	(Georgia (country)) Robitashvili
2003	20/12	Mikheil Meskhi Stadium	Locomotive Tbilisi	18 – 15	Kochebi Bolnisi	(Georgia (country)) Mgeladze
2004	22/12	Boris Paichadze Dinamo Arena	Lelo Saracens	30 – 28	Academy Tbilisi	(Georgia (country)) Javakhishvili
2005	11/12	Boris Paichadze Dinamo Arena	Locomotive Tbilisi	30 – 6	Academy Tbilisi	(Georgia (country)) Mgeladze
2006	13/12	Shevardeni Stadium	Locomotive Tbilisi	27 –13	Dinamo Tbilisi	(Georgia (country)) Chachua
2007	26/11	Mikheil Meskhi Stadium	Lelo Saracens	9 – 15	Rustavi Kharebi	(France) Péchambert
2008	09/11	Mikheil Meskhi Stadium	Locomotive Tbilisi	19 – 9	Lelo Saracens	(France) Raynal
2009	10/10	Mikheil Meskhi Stadium	Lelo Saracens	15 – 6	Batumi	(France) Raynal
2010	14/11	Mikheil Meskhi Stadium	Lelo Saracens	11 – 6	Locomotive Tbilisi	(France) Maciello
2011	05/11	Avchala Stadium	Armia Tbilisi	29 – 22	Aia Kutaisi	(France) Lafon
2013	25/05	Shevardeni Stadium	Lelo Saracens	16 – 10	Armia Tbilisi	(Ireland) Wilkinson
2014	24/05	Mikheil Meskhi Stadium	Lelo Saracens	24 – 11	Armia Tbilisi	(Ireland) Fitzgibbon
2015	09/05	Mikheil Meskhi Stadium	Lelo Saracens	30 – 21	Locomotive Tbilisi	(Ireland) Wilkinson
2016	15/05	Mikheil Meskhi Stadium	Lelo Saracens	17 – 15	Locomotive Tbilisi	(Ireland) Gallagher
2017	14/05	Mikheil Meskhi Stadium	Jiki Gori	28 – 22	Batumi	(Ireland) Murphy
2018	13/05	Avchala Stadium	Aia Kutaisi	10 – 29	Locomotive Tbilisi	(Ireland) Clancy
2019	12/05	Batumi Stadium	Batumi	36 – 11	Rustavi Kharebi	(Georgia (country)) Amashukeli
2021	12/06	Aia Arena	Aia Kutaisi	16 – 13	Batumi	(Georgia (country)) Amashukeli
2022	05/06	Boris Paichadze Dinamo Arena	Batumi	23 – 14	Rustavi Kharebi	(Georgia (country)) Amashukeli
2023	06/05	Avchala Stadium	Rustavi Kharebi	24 – 22	Batumi	(Georgia (country)) Abulashvili
2024	28/04	Avchala Stadium	Lelo Saracens	3 – 19	Aia Kutaisi	(Georgia (country)) Amashukeli
2025	11/05	Aia Arena	Aia Kutaisi	10 – 14	Batumi	(Georgia (country)) Tevzadze

== See also ==
- Rugby union in Georgia
- Georgia Cup
- Soviet Cup
- Soviet Championship
