= 2024 Rugby Europe Championship =

- Date: 3 February – 17 March 2024
- Countries: Belgium; Georgia; Germany; Netherlands; Poland; Portugal; Romania; Spain

Tournament statistics
- Champions: Georgia (16th title)
- Antim Cup: Georgia (18th title)
- Matches played: 20
- Attendance: 83,163 (4,158 per match)
- Tries scored: 122 (6.1 per match)
- Top point scorer(s): (Portugal) Hugo Aubry (48 Points)
- Top try scorer(s): (Georgia (country)) Aka Tabutsadze (7 Tries)
- Player of the tournament: (Georgia (country)) Ilia Spanderashvili

The 2024 Rugby Europe Championship was the eighth Rugby Europe Championship, the annual rugby union competition for the top European national teams outside the Six Nations Championship, and the 53rd edition of the competition (including all its previous incarnations as the FIRA Tournament, Rugby Union European Cup, FIRA Nations Cup, FIRA Trophy, and European Nations Cup).

Eight teams took part in the 2024 championship. The championship was contested by Belgium, Georgia, Germany, Poland, the Netherlands, Portugal, Romania and Spain.

The serpentine system was applied to allocate each team to their respective groups. Each team played a total of five games (three round robin group matches to determine the team's path and two play-off matches). Seeding (for a group) and relegation were calculated over a two-year cycle, as was the promotion from the Trophy competition.

Georgia entered the tournament as defending champions, having won the 2023 tournament final against Portugal. Georgia won the tournament, thus claiming their 16th title, again defeating Portugal in the final.

== Participants ==
Nation	Stadium			Head coach	Captain
Nation	Home stadium	Capacity	Location	Head coach	Captain
Belgium	Stade Charles Tondreau; Stade du Pachy	8,000; 3,000	Mons; Waterloo	(France) Laurent Dossat	Jens Torfs
Georgia	Avchala Stadium; Mikheil Meskhi Stadium	2,500; 27,223	Tbilisi	(England) Richard Cockerill	Merab Sharikadze
Germany	Fritz-Grunebaum-Sportpark; Stadion Pichterich	5,000; 6,000	Heidelberg; Neckarsulm	(Germany) Mark Kuhlmann	Jörn Schröder
Netherlands	NRCA Stadium	7,000	Amsterdam	(Wales) Lyn Jones	Hugo Langelaan
Poland	Narodowy Stadion Rugby	2,425	Gdynia	(Wales) Christian Hitt	Piotr Zeszutek
Portugal	Estádio Nacional; Estádio do Restelo	37,593; 19,856	Oeiras; Lisbon	(Argentina) Daniel Hourcade (interim)	Tomás Appleton
Romania	Arcul de Triumf Stadium	8,207	Bucharest	(France) David Gérard	Mihai Macovei
Spain	Estadio Nacional Complutense	7,000	Madrid	(Argentina) Pablo Bouza	Mario Pichardie

== Two-Year overall standings ==
Relegated to Trophy

2023-24 Rugby Europe Championships
Pos	Event Team	2023	2024	Points total
1	Georgia	10	10	20
2	Portugal	8	8	16
3	Romania (Note: Overall points difference - Romania +12, Spain -42)	6	5	11
4	Spain	5	6	11
5	Netherlands	4	4	8
6	Germany	3	3	6
7	Belgium	2	2	4
8	Poland	1	1	2

== Tables and Fixtures ==
=== Pool A ===
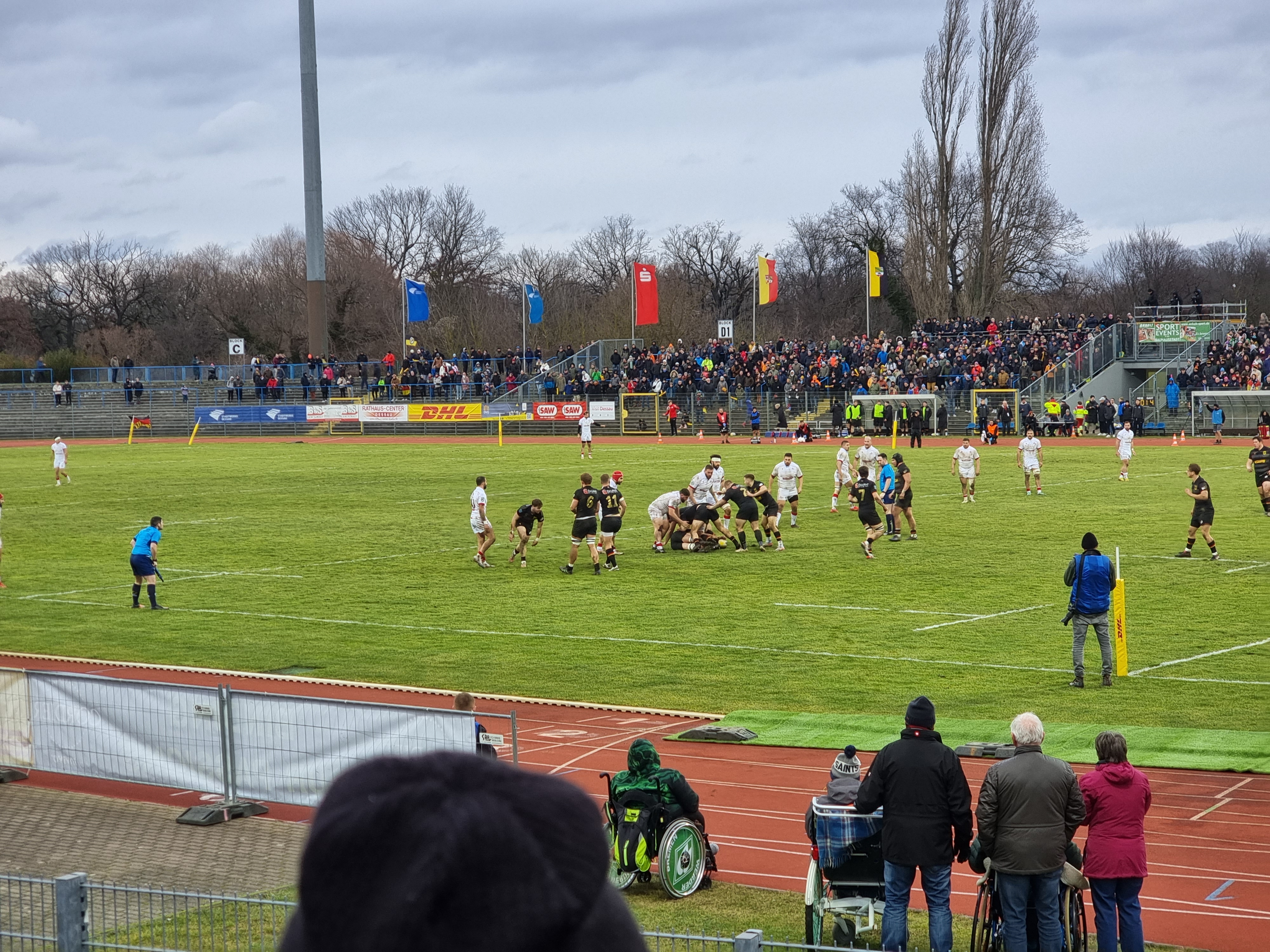
Germany against Georgia during the European Rugby Championship 2023/24 in Dessau-Roßlau.

Advances to the Grand Finals Semi-Finals
Advances to the Ranking Finals Semi-Finals

Pos.	Team	Games				Points			Tries			TBP	LBP	Table points
Pos.	Team	Played	Won	Drawn	Lost	For	Against	Diff	For	Against	Diff	TBP	LBP	Table points
1	Georgia	3	3	0	0	97	30	+67	15	3	+12	2	0	14
2	Spain	3	2	0	1	50	61	-11	6	9	-3	1	0	9
3	Netherlands	3	1	0	2	67	64	+3	8	8	0	1	1	6
4	Germany	3	0	0	3	35	94	-59	4	13	-9	0	0	0
Source - Points were awarded to the teams as follows: Win – 4 points | Draw – 2 points | At least 3 more tries than opponent – 1 point | Loss within 7 points – 1 point

==== Week 1 ====
3 February 2024
13:15 CET (UTC+1)

(1 LBP) Netherlands	18–20	Spain
	Report

NRCA Stadium, Amsterdam
Attendance: 1,400
Referee: Hollie Davidson (Scotland)

4 February 2024
15:00 CET (UTC+1)

Germany	17–28	Georgia
	Report

Paul Greifzu Stadium, Dessau-Roßlau
Attendance: 5,400
Referee: Tom Spurrier (Wales)

==== Week 2 ====
10 February 2024
14:00 GET (UTC+4)

(1 TBP) Georgia	31–10	Netherlands
	Report

Avchala Stadium, Tbilisi
Attendance: 2,963
Referee: Alexandru Ionescu (Romania)

11 February 2024
12:45 CET (UTC+1)

(1 TBP) Spain	27–5	Germany
	Report

Estadio Nacional Complutense, Madrid
Attendance: 6,000
Referee: Paulo Duarte (Portugal)

==== Week 3 ====
17 February 2024
16:00 GET (UTC+4)

(1 TBP) Georgia	38–3	Spain
	Report

Avchala Stadium, Tbilisi
Attendance: 3,000
Referee: Sam Grove White (Scotland)

18 February 2024
13:30 CET (UTC+1)

(1 TBP) Netherlands	39–13	Germany
	report

NRCA Stadium, Amsterdam
Attendance: 2,000
Referee: Michael Forrestal (Ireland)

=== Pool B ===
Advances to the Grand Finals Semi-Finals
Advances to the Ranking Finals Semi-Finals

Pos.	Team	Games				Points			Tries			TBP	LBP	Table points
Pos.	Team	Played	Won	Drawn	Lost	For	Against	Diff	For	Against	Diff	TBP	LBP	Table points
1	Portugal	3	2	0	1	109	41	+68	14	5	+9	2	1	11
2	Romania	3	2	0	1	77	75	+2	11	9	+2	1	0	9
3	Belgium	3	2	0	1	59	49	+10	7	6	+1	1	0	9
4	Poland	3	0	0	3	25	105	-80	3	15	-12	0	0	0
Source - Points were awarded to the teams as follows: Win – 4 points | Draw – 2 points | At least 3 more tries than opponent – 1 point | Loss within 7 points – 1 point

==== Week 1 ====
3 February 2024
20:00 CET (UTC+1)

Belgium	10–6	Portugal (1 LBP)
	Report

Stade Charles Tondreau, Mons
Attendance: 4,600
Referee: Saba Abulashvili (Georgia)

4 February 2024
18:15 CET (UTC+1)

Poland	8–20	Romania
	Report

Narodowym stadion dla rugby, Gdynia
Attendance: 2,500
Referee: Keane Davison (Ireland)

==== Week 2 ====
10 February 2024
14:30 EET (UTC+2)

(1 TBP) Romania	33–18	Belgium
	Report

Arcul de Triumf Stadium, Bucharest
Attendance: 5,500
Referee: Iñigo Atorrasagasti (Spain)

10 February 2024
19:00 WET (UTC+0)

(1 TBP) Portugal	54–7	Poland
	Report

Estádio Nacional, Oeiras
Attendance: 2,300
Referee: Ethan Glass (Switzerland)

==== Week 3 ====
17 February 2024
16:30 EET (UTC+2)

Romania	24–49	Portugal (1 TBP)
	Report

Arcul de Triumf Stadium, Bucharest
Attendance: 5,000
Referee: Nika Amashukeli (Georgia)

17 February 2024
19:00 CET (UTC+1)

(1 TBP) Belgium	31–10	Poland
	Report

Stade du Pachy, Waterloo
Attendance: 2,000
Referee: Ben Breakspear (Wales)

== Ranking Finals ==
Semi-finals
2 March – NRCA Stadium, Amsterdam
Netherlands	54
Poland	7
2 March – Stade du Pachy, Waterloo
Belgium	11
Germany	21

Fifth-place Final
17 March – Stade Jean-Bouin, Paris
Netherlands	45
Germany	0
Seventh-place Final
17 March – Stade Jean-Bouin, Paris
Poland	8
Belgium	34

=== Semi-finals ===
2 March 2024
16:15 CET (UTC+1)

Netherlands	54–7	Poland
	Report

NRCA Stadium, Amsterdam
Attendance: 1,700
Referee: Inigo Atorrasagasti (Spain)

2 March 2024
19:00 CET (UTC+1)

Belgium	11–21	Germany
	Report

Stade du Pachy, Waterloo
Attendance: 2,500
Referee: Sam Grove-White (Scotland)

=== Seventh-place final ===
17 March 2024
12:00 CET (UTC+1)

Poland	8–34	Belgium
	Report

Stade Jean-Bouin, Paris
Attendance: 2,000
Referee: Shota Tevzadze (Georgia)

=== Fifth-place final ===
17 March 2024
14:45 CET (UTC+1)

Netherlands	45–0	Germany
	Report

Stade Jean-Bouin, Paris
Attendance: 2,000
Referee: Paulo Duarte (Portugal)

== Grand Finals ==
Semi-finals
2 March – Mikheil Meskhi Stadium, Tbilisi
Georgia	43
Romania	5
3 March – Estádio do Restelo, Lisbon
Portugal	33
Spain	30

Cup Final
17 March – Stade Jean-Bouin, Paris
Georgia	36
Portugal	10
Bronze Final
17 March – Stade Jean-Bouin, Paris
Romania	33
Spain	40

=== Semi-finals ===
2 March 2024
16:00 GET (UTC+4)

Georgia	43–5	Romania
	Report

Mikheil Meskhi Stadium, Tbilisi
Attendance: 10,300
Referee: Peter Martin (Ireland)

3 March 2024
15:00 WET (UTC+0)

Portugal	33–30	Spain
	Report

Estádio do Restelo, Lisbon
Attendance: 8,000
Referee: Benoit Rousselet (France)

=== Bronze Final ===
17 March 2024
18:15 CET (UTC+1)

Romania	33–40	Spain
	Report

Stade Jean-Bouin, Paris
Attendance: 6,000
Referee: Adam Jones (Wales)

=== Cup Final ===
17 March 2024
21:00 CET (UTC+1)

Georgia	36–10	Portugal
	Report

Stade Jean-Bouin, Paris
Attendance: 8,000
Referee: Tual Trainini (France)

== Final standings ==
Pos.	Team	Points
1	Georgia	10
2	Portugal	8
3	Spain	6
4	Romania	5
5	Netherlands	4
6	Germany	3
7	Belgium	2
8	Poland	1

== Team of the Tournament ==
On 25 March 2024 Rugby Europe published its Team of the Tournament
Ilia Spanderashvili was voted the player of the tournament by the fans.

Pos.		Player	Club / Province	Competition
LP	1	(Romania) Iulian Harțig	(Romania) CSM București	(Romania) Liga Națională de Rugby
HK	2	(Georgia (country)) Vano Karkadze	(France) Montpellier	(France) Top 14
TP	3	(Georgia (country)) Irakli Aptsiauri	(France) FC Grenoble	(France) Pro D2
LL	4	(Netherlands) Koen Bloemen	(France) Bourg-en-Bresse	(France) Championnat Fédéral Nationale
RL	5	(Spain) Mario Pichardie	(England) Loughborough Students	(England) National League 2 West
BF	6	(Georgia (country)) Ilia Spanderashvili	(Georgia (country)) Black Lion	(Europe) Super Cup / (Europe) EPCR Challenge Cup
OF	7	(Netherlands) Wolf van Dijk	(Netherlands) DIOK	(Netherlands) Ereklasse
N8	8	(Portugal) Nicolas Martins	(France) Soyaux Angoulême	(France) Pro D2
SH	9	(Portugal) Hugo Camacho	(France) Bayonne	(France) Top 14
FH	10	(Portugal) Hugo Aubry	(France) Rouen	(France) Pro D2
LW	11	(Spain) Martiniano Cian Garcia	(Spain) Castilla y León Iberians	(Europe) Super Cup
IC	12	(Georgia (country)) Merab Sharikadze	(Georgia (country)) Black Lion	(Europe) Super Cup / (Europe) EPCR Challenge Cup
OC	13	(Georgia (country)) Giorgi Kveseladze	(Georgia (country)) Black Lion	(Europe) Super Cup / (Europe) EPCR Challenge Cup
RW	14	(Georgia (country)) Aka Tabutsadze	(Georgia (country)) Black Lion	(Europe) Super Cup / (Europe) EPCR Challenge Cup
FB	15	(Portugal) Manuel Cardoso Pinto	(Portugal) Agronomia	(Portugal) Campeonato Português de Rugby

== International broadcasters ==
Country	Broadcaster	Summary
Belgium	—	Rugby Europe (registration required)
Georgia	Rugby TV; Imedi TV	Georgia games shown live via Rugby TV and Imedi TV. Also Georgia games are streamed and free on Rugby TV Facebook page
Germany	ProSieben Maxx; Joyn; Ran	Pro7 Maxx for Germany games, with others via streaming platforms Joyn and Ran
Netherlands	Ziggo	Netherlands' games only.
Poland	—	Rugby Europe (registration required)
Portugal	Sport TV	Portugal games shown live
Romania	—	Rugby Europe (registration required)
Spain	Movistar Plus+	Spain games only
Rest of the World	Rugby Europe; RugbyPassTV	All games available through streaming via Rugby Europe (registration required). Some games are streamed and free on Rugby Europe Youtube channel One game from each round will be broadcast on World Rugby-owned RugbyPassTV

== See also ==
- Rugby Europe International Championships
- Antim Cup
