= Aka Tabutsadze =

Georgian rugby union player

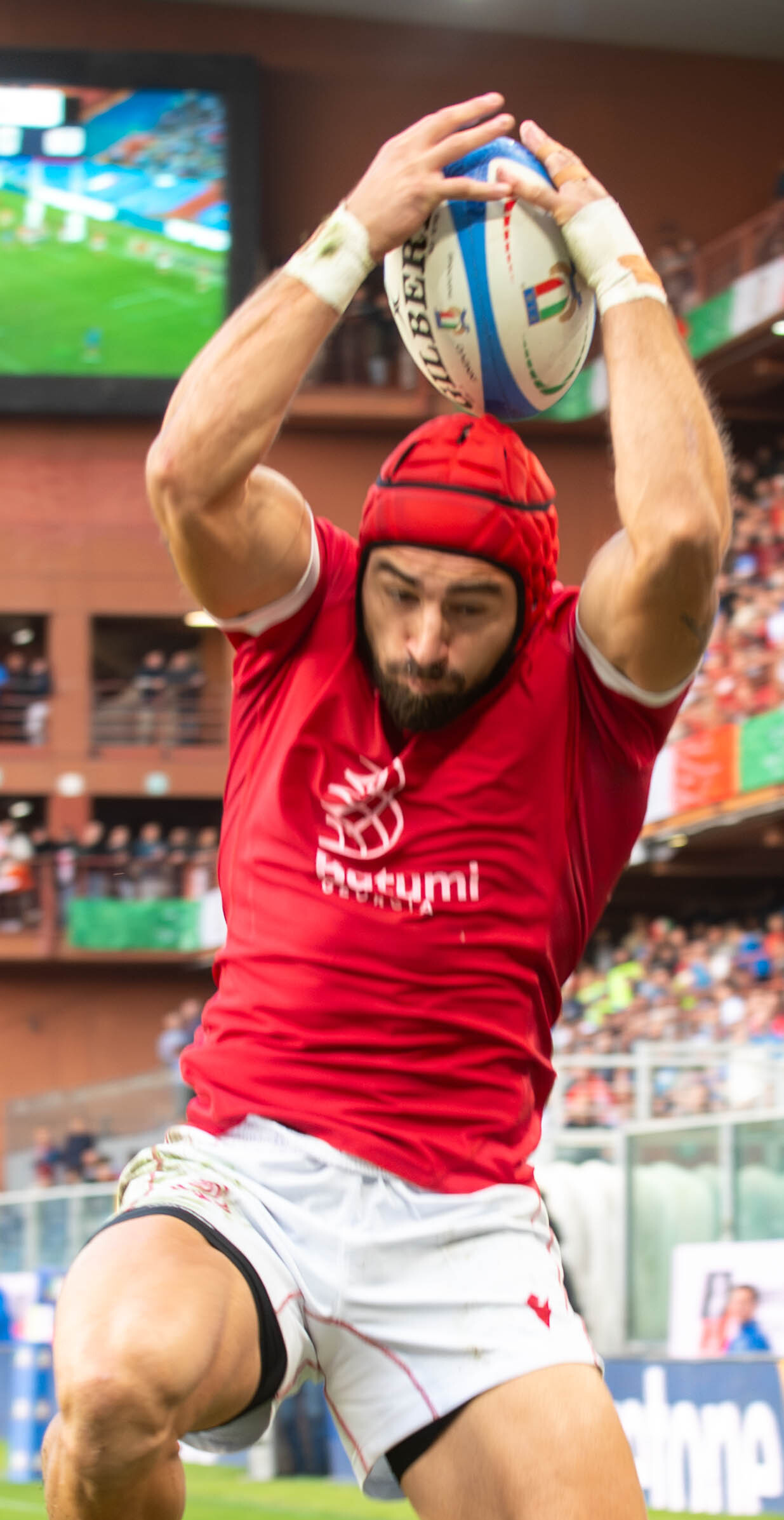
- Born: Akaki Tabutsadze; 19 August 1997 (age 29) Tbilisi, Georgia
- Height: 1.84 m (6 ft 1/2 in)
- Weight: 91 kg (14 st 5 lb; 201 lb)

Rugby union career
- Position: Wing
Senior career
Years	Team	Apps	(Points)
2015–	Lelo Saracens		
2020–	The Black Lion	35	(95)
- Correct as of 22 November 2026
International career
Years	Team	Apps	(Points)
2018	Georgia U20	2	(0)
2018	Georgia XV	1	(0)
2020–	Georgia	66	(290)
- Correct as of 22 November 2026

Akaki "Aka" Tabutsadze (born 19 August 1997) is a Georgian rugby union player. He plays as Wing for Georgian rugby club Black Lion. Tabutsadze is widely considered as one of Georgia's greatest players of all time, he is their all-time leading try-scorer and is also the 5th highest try scorer in international rugby.

== Biography ==
Akaki Tabutsadze began his senior career with Lelo Saracens, where he still plays today. He participates in the 2017 junior rugby union world championship in Georgia with the Georgian selection. Then in the process, he joined the Georgia rugby sevens team participating in the Seven's Grand Prix Series 2017. He will be summoned again the following year. In the process, he was summoned with Georgia XV, for a summer tournament bringing together Racing 92, Argentina XV and Brazil. In early 2020, he was called up for the first time with the Georgia rugby union team, for a confrontation against Spain. Again called for the next match against Belgium, he scored a quadruple. He was subsequently included in the squad competing for the Autumn Nations Cup.

== Honours ==
=== Lelo Saracens ===
- Didi 10
  - Champions: (2) 2014–15, 2015–16
  - Runners-up: (1) 2023–24
  - Third place: (2) 2016–17, 2022–23
- Georgian Youth A League
  - Runners-up: (1) 2014–15

=== Black Lion ===
- Rugby Europe Super Cup
  - Champions: (4) 2021–22, 2022, 2023, 2024

=== Georgia ===
- Rugby Europe Championship
  - Champions: (6) 2020, 2021, 2022, 2023, 2024, 2025
