= 2026 Rugby Europe Super Cup =

Rugby union tournament for European clubs

Tournament details
- Countries: Belgium; Czech Republic; Netherlands; Portugal; Romania
- Date: 10 October – 13 December 2026

Tournament statistics
- Teams: 5
- Matches played: 6
- Attendance: 2,950 (492 per match)
- Tries scored: 61 (10.17 per match)

Final

The 2026 Rugby Europe Super Cup is the sixth edition of the Rugby Europe Super Cup, an annual rugby union competition for professional clubs and franchises outside the three major leagues of European rugby. The holders, Castilla y León Iberians of Spain, have won the previous tournament but are not competing in this season competition.

== Background ==
The Super Cup takes place without the four-time champions, Black Lion and one-time champions Castilla y León Iberians, due to their withdrawal from the competition. The format of the Cup was changed, with all five teams playing a round-robin format. The season fixtures and dates were released by Rugby Europe in September 2026. The competition is scheduled to run for two months.

== Teams and personnel ==
Location of teams of the 2026 Rugby Europe Super Cup.

Team	Stadium			Head coach	Captain
Team	Home stadium	Capacity	Location	Head coach	Captain
Bohemia Rugby Warriors	Rugby Aréna Tatra Smíchov	558	Prague	Antonín Brabec and Jan Oswald	Dan Hošek
Brussels Devils	Sportcomplex Sint-Gillis	1,000	Dendermonde	Sébastien Guns	Felipe Geraghty
Delta	NRCA Stadium	10,000	Amsterdam	Mitch McGahan	Joris Smits
Lusitanos	Complexo Desportivo	N/A	Caldas da Rainha	Simon Mannix	Tomás Appleton
Romanian Wolves	Arcul de Triumf	8,207	Bucharest	Stelian Burcea	Alexandru Savin

== Table ==
Key to colours
Champions

Pos	Team	Pld	W	D	L	PF	PA	PD	TF	TA	TB	LB	Pts
1	Lusitanos	2	2	0	0	151	17	+134	18	2	2	0	10
2	Delta	3	2	0	1	81	71	+10	11	10	1	0	9
3	Romanian Wolves	3	2	0	1	87	146	−59	12	20	0	0	8
4	Brussels Devils	2	0	0	2	73	81	−8	11	11	0	2	2
5	Bohemia Rugby Warriors	2	0	0	2	24	101	−77	4	17	0	0	0

Updated to match(es) played on 24 October 2026. Source: Rugby Europe
Rules for classification:
If two teams have the same number of points the best ranked will be: 1) match points in the games played between the tied Unions; 2) tries in the games played between the tied Unions; 3) match points difference in all pool games; 4) tries difference for in all pool games; 5) match points for in all pool games.
If three or more teams have same number of points, the best ranked will be: 1) match points difference in all pool games; 2) tries for in all pool games; 4) match points for in all pool games.
Points were awarded to the teams as follows: Win – 4 points, Draw – 2 points, At least 3 more tries than opponent – 1 point, Loss within 7 points – 1 point

== Fixtures ==
=== Round 1 ===
10 October 2026
11:10 CEST (UTC+2)

Bohemia Rugby Warriors	12–27	Delta (1 TBP)
	Report

Rugby Aréna Tatra Smíchov, Prague
Attendance: 500
Referee: (Switzerland) Ethan Glass

11 October 2026
13:00 EEST (UTC+2)

Romanian Wolves	50–46	Brussels Devils (1 LBP)
	Report

Arcul de Triumf, Bucharest
Attendance: 1,000
Referee: (Spain) Carlos Guerrero

=== Round 2 ===
17 October 2026
14:00 CEST (UTC+2)

Bohemia Rugby Warriors	12–74	Lusitanos (1 TBP)
	Report

Rugby Aréna Tatra Smíchov, Prague
Attendance: 600
Referee: (Germany) Maria Latos

17 October 2026
17:00 CEST (UTC+2)

Delta	23–32	Romanian Wolves
	Report

NRCA Stadium, Amsterdam
Attendance: 200
Referee: (Moldova) Eugeniu Procopi

=== Round 3 ===
24 October 2026
14:00 WEST (UTC+1)

(1 TBP) Lusitanos	77–5	Romanian Wolves
	Report

Complexo Desportivo, Caldas da Rainha
Attendance: 200
Referee: (Germany) Benedikt Niklas

24 October 2026
18:00 CEST (UTC+2)

(1 LBP) Brussels Devils	27–31	Delta
	Report

Sportcomplex Sint-Gillis, Dendermonde
Attendance: 450
Referee: (Portugal) Diogo Miranda

=== Round 4 ===
5 December 2026
14:00 EET (UTC+1)

Romanian Wolves	v	Bohemia Rugby Warriors

Arcul de Triumf, Bucharest

5 December 2026
15:00 WET (UTC+0)

Lusitanos	v	Brussels Devils

=== Round 5 ===
12 December 2026
15:00 CET (UTC+1)

Brussels Devils	v	Bohemia Rugby Warriors

Sportcomplex Sint-Gillis, Dendermonde

13 December 2026
14:00 CET (UTC+1)

Delta	v	Lusitanos

NRCA Stadium, Amsterdam

== See also ==
- 2026–27 European Rugby Champions Cup
- 2026–27 EPCR Challenge Cup
