= 2023 Rugby Europe Super Cup =

Rugby union tournament for European clubs

Tournament details
- Countries: Belgium; Czech Republic; Georgia; Israel; Netherlands; Portugal; Romania; Spain
- Date: 4 November – 22 December 2023

Tournament statistics
- Teams: 8
- Matches played: 20
- Attendance: 6,664 (333 per match)
- Tries scored: 153 (7.65 per match)

Final
- Champions: (Georgia (country)) Black Lion (3rd title)
- Runners-up: (Israel) Tel Aviv Heat

The 2023 Rugby Europe Super Cup was the third edition of the Rugby Europe Super Cup, an annual rugby union competition for professional clubs and franchises outside the three major leagues of European rugby. This edition of the Rugby Europe Super Cup featured one new addition to the competition, the Bohemia Rugby Warriors from the Czech Republic, who in turn replaced RC Batumi of Georgia, the team that participated in the previous edition of the tournament. For the first time, eight separate nations were represented in the competition.

The Black Lion Tbilisi from Georgia, as winners of the 2022 edition are also competing by invitation in the second tier European Challenge Cup, the first time the winner of the Super Cup has been integrated into the professional EPCR competition.

== Teams ==
Nation	Stadium			Head coach	Captain
Nation	Home stadium	Capacity	Location	Head coach	Captain
(Georgia (country)) Black Lion	Avchala Stadium	2,500	Tbilisi	(Georgia (country)) Levan Maisashvili	Merab Sharikadze
(Czech Republic) Bohemia Rugby Warriors	Markéta Stadium	10,000	Prague	(Czech Republic) Antonín Brabec and Jan Oswald	Patrik Prucha
(Belgium) Brussels Devils	Stade Communal de Soignies	1,000	Soignies	(Belgium) Sébastien Guns	Robin Vermeersch
(Spain) Castilla y León Iberians	Estadio Pepe Rojo	5,000	Valladolid	(Spain) Miguel Velasco	Mario Pichardie
(Netherlands) Delta	NRCA Stadium	10,000	Amsterdam	(South Africa) Gareth Gilbert	Vikas Meijer
(Portugal) Lusitanos	Estádio Nacional	500	Lisbon	(France) Sébastien Bertrank	Tomás Appleton
(Romania) Romanian Wolves	Arena Zimbrilor	2,300	Baia Mare	(Romania) Eugen Apjok	Nicolaas Immelman
(Israel) Tel Aviv Heat	Tsirio Stadium*; National Rugby Center*	13,331; 3,000	Limassol*; Budapest*	(South Africa) Kevin Musikanth	Prince ǃGaoseb

* Owing to the ongoing war in Israel, Tel Aviv Heat's home matches were played in Cyprus and Hungary

Location of teams of the 2023 Rugby Europe Super Cup.

== Group stage ==
The format was mildly rejigged from previous seasons with a 'major' and 'minor' group, rather than two geographical pools, although the distribution was roughly north (Group B) and south (Group A).

The 'major' group, Group A contained the four highest seeds, three of whom qualify for the semi finals. The 'minor' group, Group B, contained the teams ranked 5th to 8th, and the winner of that group became the fourth semi finalist. The aim was to ensure relative competitiveness across the competition.

Tel Aviv Heat played both of its home fixtures outside Israel due to the ongoing conflict in Gaza.

Key to colours
Advances to the Grand Finals Semi-Finals
Advances to the Ranking Finals Semi-Finals

=== Pool A ===
Pos.	Team	Games				Points			Tries			TBP	LBP	Table points
Pos.	Team	Played	Won	Drawn	Lost	For	Against	Diff	For	Against	Diff	TBP	LBP	Table points
1	(Georgia (country)) Black Lion	3	3	0	0	90	46	+44	13	6	+7	2	0	14
2	(Israel) Tel Aviv Heat	3	2	0	1	96	72	+24	14	8	+6	2	1	11
3	(Spain) Castilla y León Iberians	3	1	0	2	57	90	-33	8	13	-5	0	0	4
4	(Portugal) Lusitanos	3	0	0	3	36	71	-35	3	11	-8	0	1	1
Points were awarded to the teams as follows: Win – 4 points | Draw – 2 points | At least 3 more tries than opponent – 1 point | Loss within 7 points – 1 point

==== Round 1 ====
4 November 2023
16:00 GET (UTC+04)

(1 TBP) Black Lion (Georgia (country))	39–19	(Spain) Castilla y León Iberians
	Report

Avchala Stadium, Tbilisi
Attendance: n/a
Referee: (Romania) Cristian Șerban

4 November 2023
15:00 WET (UTC+00)

Lusitanos (Portugal)	23–31	(Israel) Tel Aviv Heat (1 TBP)
	Report

Estádio Nacional, Lisbon
Attendance: n/a
Referee: (Scotland) Ian Kenny

==== Round 2 ====
11 November 2023
15:00 WET (UTC+00)

Lusitanos (Portugal)	0–22	(Georgia (country)) Black Lion (1 TBP)
	Report

Estádio Nacional, Lisbon
Attendance: 300
Referee: (Ireland) Keane Davsion

12 November 2023
12:00 CET (UTC+01)

Castilla y León Iberians (Spain)	20–38	(Israel) Tel Aviv Heat (1 TBP)
	Report

Estadio Pepe Rojo, Valladolid
Attendance: 500
Referee: (Georgia (country)) Shota Tevzadze

==== Round 3 ====
18 November 2023
19:00 EEST (UTC+02)

(1 LBP) Tel Aviv Heat (Israel)	27–29	(Georgia (country)) Black Lion
	Report

Tsirio Stadium, Limassol
Attendance: 0
Referee: (France) Luc Ramos

19 November 2023
12:30 CET (UTC+01)

Castilla y León Iberians (Spain)	18–13	(Portugal) Lusitanos (1 LBP)
	Report

Estadio Pepe Rojo, Valladolid
Attendance: n/a
Referee: (Georgia (country)) Saba Abulashvili

=== Pool B ===
Pos.	Team	Games				Points			Tries			TBP	LBP	Table points
Pos.	Team	Played	Won	Drawn	Lost	For	Against	Diff	For	Against	Diff	TBP	LBP	Table points
1	(Romania) Romanian Wolves	3	3	0	0	167	17	+150	25	3	+22	3	0	15
2	(Belgium) Brussels Devils	3	2	0	1	89	82	+7	14	9	+5	2	0	10
3	(Netherlands) Delta	3	1	0	2	91	72	+19	11	12	-1	1	0	5
4	(Czech Republic) Bohemia Rugby Warriors	3	0	0	3	17	193	-176	2	28	-26	0	0	0
Points were awarded to the teams as follows: Win – 4 points | Draw – 2 points | At least 3 more tries than opponent – 1 point | Loss within 7 points – 1 point

==== Round 1 ====
4 November 2023
19:00 CET (UTC+01)

(1 TBP) Brussels Devils (Belgium)	41–12	(Netherlands) Delta
	Report

Stade Communal de Soignies, Soignies
Attendance: 582
Referee: (Wales) Mike English

5 November 2023
14:00 EET (UTC+02)

(1 TBP) Romanian Wolves (Romania)	76–7	(Czech Republic) Bohemia Rugby Warriors
	Report

Arena Zimbrilor, Baia Mare
Attendance: 1,000
Referee: (Moldova) Eugeniu Procopi

==== Round 2 ====
10 November 2023
19:30 CET (UTC+01)

Delta (Netherlands)	5–31	(Romania) Romanian Wolves (1 TBP)
	Report

NRCA Stadium, Amsterdam
Attendance: 300
Referee: (Georgia (country)) Saba Abulashvili

11 November 2023
14:00 CET (UTC+01)

Bohemia Rugby Warriors (Czech Republic)	10–43	(Belgium) Brussels Devils (1 TBP)
	Report

Markéta Stadium, Prague
Attendance: n/a
Referee: (Spain) Iñigo Atorrasagasti

==== Round 3 ====
16 November 2023
19:00 CET (UTC+01)

Bohemia Rugby Warriors (Czech Republic)	0–74	(Netherlands) Delta (1 TBP)
	Report

Markéta Stadium, Prague
Attendance: 732
Referee: (Switzerland) Ethan Glass

18 November 2023
20:30 CET (UTC+01)

Brussels Devils (Belgium)	5–60	(Romania) Romanian Wolves (1 TBP)
	Report

Nelson Mandela Stadium, Brussels
Attendance: 650
Referee: (Portugal) Paulo Duarte

== Ranking Finals ==
Fifth place semi-finals
3 December – Soignies
(Netherlands) Delta	8
(Portugal) Lusitanos	53
2 December – Amsterdam
(Belgium) Brussels Devils	44
(Czech Republic) Bohemia Rugby Warriors	10

Fifth place Final
16 December – Amsterdam
(Portugal) Lusitanos (a.e.t.)	46
(Belgium) Brussels Devils	29
Seventh place final
16 December – Amsterdam
(Netherlands) Delta	55
(Czech Republic) Bohemia Rugby Warriors	3

=== Semi-finals ===
2 December 2023
19:00 CET (UTC+01)

Brussels Devils (Belgium)	44–10	(Czech Republic) Bohemia Rugby Warriors
	Report

Stade Communal de Soignies, Soignies
Attendance: 250
Referee: (Romania) Alexandru Ionescu

3 December 2023
12:45 CET (UTC+01)

Delta (Netherlands)	8–53	(Portugal) Lusitanos
	Report

NRCA Stadium, Amsterdam
Attendance: 100
Referee: (Switzerland) Ethan Glass

=== 7th place final ===
16 December 2023
15:00 CET (UTC+01)

Delta (Netherlands)	55–3	(Czech Republic) Bohemia Rugby Warriors
	Report

NRCA Stadium, Amsterdam
Attendance: 150
Referee: (Portugal) Paulo Duarte

=== 5th place final ===
16 December 2023
12:00 CET (UTC+01)

Lusitanos (Portugal)	46–29 (a.e.t.)	(Belgium) Brussels Devils
	Report

NRCA Stadium, Amsterdam
Attendance: 150
Referee: (Spain) Iñigo Atorrasagasti

== Grand Finals ==
Semi-finals
2 December – Tbilisi
(Georgia (country)) Black Lion	41
(Spain) Castilla y León Iberians	0
2 December – Budapest
(Israel) Tel Aviv Heat	31
(Romania) Romanian Wolves	6

Final
22 December – Tbilisi
(Georgia (country)) Black Lion	27
(Israel) Tel Aviv Heat	17
Bronze final
16 December – Amsterdam
(Spain) Castilla y León Iberians	17
(Romania) Romanian Wolves	41

=== Semi-finals ===
2 December 2023
14:00 GET (UTC+04)

Black Lion (Georgia (country))	41–0	(Spain) Castilla y León Iberians
	Report

Avchala Stadium, Tbilisi
Attendance: 800
Referee: (Scotland) Ru Campbell

2 December 2023
13:30 CET (UTC+01)

Tel Aviv Heat (Israel)	31–6	(Romania) Romanian Wolves
	Report

National Rugby Center, Budapest
Attendance: 500
Referee: (Ireland) Andrew Cole

=== Bronze final ===
16 December 2023
18:00 CET (UTC+01)

Castilla y León Iberians (Spain)	17–41	(Romania) Romanian Wolves
	Report

NRCA Stadium, Amsterdam
Attendance: 150
Referee: (Georgia (country)) Sulkhan Chikhladze

=== Cup Final ===
22 December 2023
15:00 GET (UTC+04)

Black Lion (Georgia (country))	27–17	(Israel) Tel Aviv Heat
	Report

Avchala Stadium, Tbilisi
Attendance: 1,500
Referee: (Ireland) Andrew Cole

== See also ==
- 2023–24 European Rugby Champions Cup
- 2023–24 EPCR Challenge Cup
