= 2025–26 Rugby Europe Super Cup =

Rugby union tournament for European clubs

Tournament details
- Countries: Belgium; Czech Republic; Netherlands; Portugal; Romania; Spain
- Date: 10 October 2025 – 25 January 2026

Tournament statistics
- Teams: 6
- Matches played: 19
- Attendance: 9,100 (479 per match)
- Tries scored: 160 (8.42 per match)

Final
- Champions: (Spain) Castilla y León Iberians (1st title)
- Runners-up: (Portugal) Lusitanos

The 2025–26 Rugby Europe Super Cup is the fifth edition of the Rugby Europe Super Cup, an annual rugby union competition for professional clubs and franchises outside the three major leagues of European rugby. The holders, Black Lion of Georgia, have won the four previous tournaments but are not competing in this seasons competition.

== Description ==
The Super Cup will take place without the four-time champions, Black Lion, due to their withdrawal from the competition.

The format of the Cup was changed, with all 6 teams playing a round-robin format, with the top four advancing to the semifinal stage.

== Teams ==
Location of teams of the 2025–26 Rugby Europe Super Cup.

Team	Stadium			Head coach	Captain
Team	Home stadium	Capacity	Location	Head coach	Captain
(Czech Republic) Bohemia Rugby Warriors	Markéta Stadium	10,000	Prague	(Czech Republic) Antonín Brabec and Jan Oswald	Dan Hošek
(Belgium) Brussels Devils	Stade Communal de Soignies	1,000	Soignies	(Belgium) Sébastien Guns	Felipe Geraghty
(Spain) Castilla y León Iberians	Estadio Nueva Balastera	8,100	Palencia	(Argentina) Raúl Pérez	Matthew Foulds
(Netherlands) Delta	NRCA Stadium	10,000	Amsterdam	(New Zealand) Mitch McGahan	Joris Smits
(Portugal) Lusitanos	Estádio Nacional	500	Lisbon	(New Zealand) Simon Mannix	Tomás Appleton
(Romania) Romanian Wolves	Arcul de Triumf	8,207	Bucharest	(Romania) Stelian Burcea	Alexandru Savin

== Pool Stage ==
Pos	Team	Pld	W	D	L	PF	PA	PD	TF	TA	TB	LB	Pts	Qualification
1	(Spain) Castilla y León Iberians	5	5	0	0	256	60	+196	53	7	5	0	25	Semi-finals
2	(Portugal) Lusitanos	5	4	0	1	167	81	+86	23	11	4	0	20	Semi-finals
3	(Belgium) Brussels Devils	5	2	0	3	146	176	−30	18	26	2	0	10	Semi-finals
4	(Netherlands) Delta	5	2	0	3	129	169	−40	19	25	1	0	9	Semi-finals
5	(Czech Republic) Bohemia Rugby Warriors	5	2	0	3	121	183	−62	15	25	1	0	9	
6	(Romania) Romanian Wolves	5	0	0	5	77	227	−150	10	31	0	0	0	

Updated to match(es) played on completed. Source: Rugby Europe
Rules for classification:
If two teams have the same number of points the best ranked will be: 1) match points in the games played between the tied Unions; 2) tries in the games played between the tied Unions; 3) match points difference in all pool games; 4) tries difference for in all pool games; 5) match points for in all pool games.
If three or more teams have same number of points, the best ranked will be: 1) match points difference in all pool games; 2) tries for in all pool games; 4) match points for in all pool games.
Points were awarded to the teams as follows: Win – 4 points, Draw – 2 points, At least 3 more tries than opponent – 1 point, Loss within 7 points – 1 point

(Q): qualified for the stage indicated. (E) : eliminated.

=== Round 1 ===
10 October 2025
19:00 CEST (UTC+02)

(1 TBP) Castilla y León Iberians (Spain)	66–20	(Belgium) Brussels Devils
	Report

Estadio Nueva Balastera, Palencia
Attendance: 300
Referee: (Romania) Alex Ionescu

11 October 2025
15:00 EEST (UTC+03)

Romanian Wolves (Romania)	17–40	(Netherlands) Delta
	Report

Arcul de Triumf, Bucharest
Attendance: 1,100
Referee: (Portugal) Diogo Miranda

11 October 2025
15:30 WEST (UTC+01)

(1 TBP) Lusitanos (Portugal)	42–21	(Czech Republic) Bohemia Rugby Warriors
	Report

Estádio Nacional, Lisbon
Attendance: 150
Referee: (Poland) Lukasz Jasinski

=== Round 2 ===
18 October 2025
13:00 CEST (UTC+02)

Delta (Netherlands)	17–50	(Spain) Castilla y León Iberians (1 TBP)
	Report

NRCA Stadium, Amsterdam
Attendance: 500
Referee: (Georgia (country)) Saba Makharadze

18 October 2025
16:30 EEST (UTC+03)

Romanian Wolves (Romania)	24–39	(Czech Republic) Bohemia Rugby Warriors (1 TBP)
	Report

Arcul de Triumf, Bucharest
Attendance: 750
Referee: (Switzerland) Ethan Glass

18 October 2025
19:30 CEST (UTC+02)

Brussels Devils (Belgium)	17–41	(Portugal) Lusitanos (1 TBP)
	Report

Stade Communal de Soignies, Soignies
Attendance: 500
Referee: (Romania) Nicolae Fratila

=== Round 3 ===
24 October 2025
19:00 CEST (UTC+02)

(1 TBP) Castilla y León Iberians (Spain)	62–7	(Romania) Romanian Wolves
	Report

Estadio Nueva Balastera, Palencia
Attendance: 600
Referee: (Georgia (country)) Saba Abulashvili

25 October 2025
13:00 CEST (UTC+02)

(1 TBP) Lusitanos (Portugal)	36–10	(Netherlands) Delta
	Report

Estádio Nacional, Lisbon
Attendance: 250
Referee: (Moldova) Eugeniu Procopi

25 October 2025
20:00 CEST (UTC+02)

Bohemia Rugby Warriors (Czech Republic)	30–20	(Belgium) Brussels Devils
	Report

Marketa Stadium, Prague
Attendance: 1,800
Referee: (Portugal) Diogo Inacio

=== Round 4 ===
5 December 2025
17:00 CET (UTC+01)

(1 TBP) Castilla y León Iberians (Spain)	52–3	(Czech Republic) Bohemia Rugby Warriors
	Report

Estadio Nueva Balastera, Palencia
Attendance: 200
Referee: (Portugal) Diogo Miranda

6 December 2025
18:00 EET (UTC+02)

Romanian Wolves (Romania)	7–35	(Portugal) Lusitanos (1 TBP)
	Report

Arcul de Triumf, Bucharest
Attendance: 500
Referee: (Spain) Alberto Diaz

6 December 2025
19:30 CET (UTC+01)

Delta (Netherlands)	17–38	(Belgium) Brussels Devils (1 TBP)
	Report

NRCA Stadium, Amsterdam
Attendance: 500
Referee: (Spain) Eki Fanlo

=== Round 5 ===
13 December 2025
14:00 CET (UTC+01)

Bohemia Rugby Warriors (Czech Republic)	28–45	(Netherlands) Delta (1 TBP)
	Report

Marketa Stadium, Prague
Attendance: 300
Referee: (Switzerland) Ethan Glass

13 December 2025
15:30 WET (UTC+00)

Lusitanos (Portugal)	13–26	(Spain) Castilla y León Iberians (1TBP)
	Report

Estádio Nacional, Lisbon
Attendance: 150
Referee: (Georgia (country)) Shota Tevzadze

13 December 2025
19:30 CET (UTC+01)

(1 TBP) Brussels Devils (Belgium)	51–22	(Romania) Romanian Wolves
	Report

Stade Communal de Soignies, Soignies
Attendance: 300
Referee: (Netherlands) Edwin Van Der Spek

== Play-offs ==
=== Semi-finals ===
16 January 2026
19:00 CET (UTC+01)

Castilla y León Iberians (Spain)	24–19	(Netherlands) Delta
	Report

Estadio Nueva Balastera, Palencia
Attendance: 300
Referee: (Portugal) Diogo Miranda

17 January 2026
15:00 WET (UTC+00)

Lusitanos (Portugal)	63–14	(Belgium) Brussels Devils
	Report

Estádio Nacional, Lisbon
Attendance: 100
Referee: (Romania) Alex Ionescu

=== Bronze final ===
24 January 2026
13:00 CET (UTC+01)

Delta (Netherlands)	36–31	(Belgium) Brussels Devils
	Report

NRCA Stadium, Amsterdam
Attendance: 600
Referee: (Moldova) Eugeniu Procopi

=== Cup final ===
24 January 2026
16:00 CET (UTC+01)

Castilla y León Iberians (Spain)	42–17	(Portugal) Lusitanos
	Report

NRCA Stadium, Amsterdam
Attendance: 200
Referee: (Georgia (country)) Saba Abulashvili

== See also ==
- 2025–26 European Rugby Champions Cup
- 2025–26 EPCR Challenge Cup
