= Jaba Bregvadze =

Georgian rugby union player

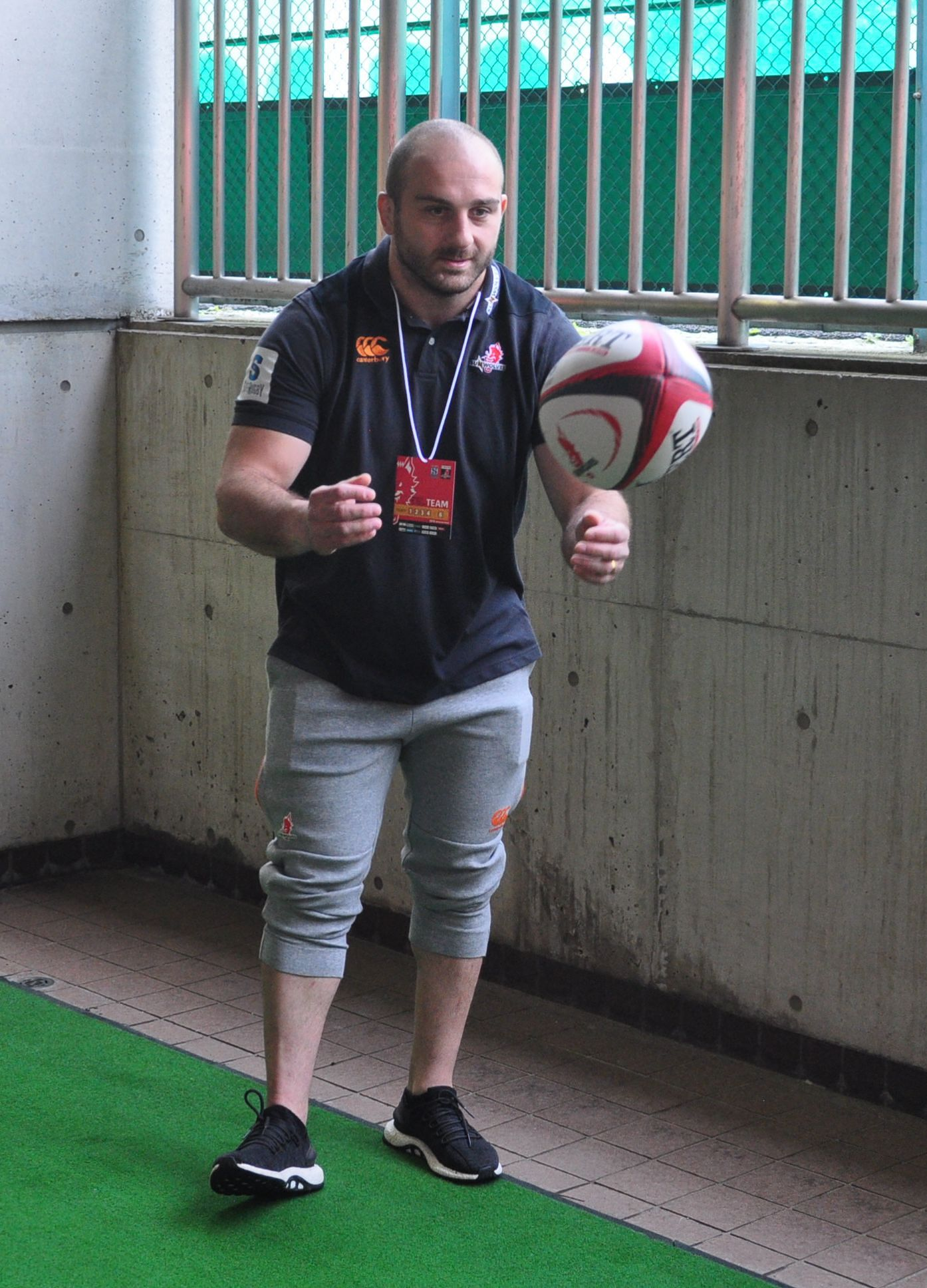
- Born: 24 April 1987 (age 39) Tbilisi, Georgian SSR, Soviet Union
- Height: 1.81 m (5 ft 11 1/2 in)
- Weight: 102 kg (16 st 1 lb; 225 lb)

Rugby union career
- Position: Hooker
Senior career
Years	Team	Apps	(Points)
–2012	Kochebi		
2012–2014	Toulouse	27	(10)
2014–2015	Kochebi	12	(20)
2015–2017	Worcester	32	(5)
2017–2017	Krasny Yar	8	(0)
2018–2020	Sunwolves	7	(5)
2021–2022	Agen	9	(0)
2022	Kubota Spears	4	(5)
2022-	Black Lion	5	(0)
- Correct as of 28 March 2022
International career
Years	Team	Apps	(Points)
2008–2022	Georgia	65	(25)
- Correct as of 29 July 2024

Jaba Bregvadze (born 24 April 1987) is a Georgian rugby union player. His position is hooker. Who plays for Georgian club Black Lion.

Bregvadze played for Stade Toulousain in the Top 14 and Worcester Warriors. Currently he plays for Kubota Spears in Japan Rugby League One. He also plays for the Georgia national team. He played for Georgia in the 2011 Rugby World Cup and the 2015 Rugby World Cup.

== Honours ==
=== Toulouse ===
- Top 14
  - Champions: (1) 2011–12

=== Black Lion ===
- Rugby Europe Super Cup
  - Champions: (1) 2022

=== Georgia ===
- Rugby Europe Championship
  - Champions: (5) 2008–10, 2013–14, 2015–16, 2021, 2022
