= 2024 Rugby Europe Super Cup =

Rugby union tournament for European clubs

Tournament details
- Countries: Belgium; Czech Republic; Georgia; Netherlands; Portugal; Romania; Spain
- Date: 7 September – 20 October 2024

Tournament statistics
- Teams: 7
- Matches played: 14
- Attendance: 6,150 (439 per match)
- Tries scored: 100 (7.14 per match)

Final
- Champions: (Georgia (country)) Black Lion (4th title)
- Runners-up: (Portugal) Lusitanos

The 2024 Rugby Europe Super Cup is the fourth edition of the Rugby Europe Super Cup, an annual rugby union competition for professional clubs and franchises outside the three major leagues of European rugby. The holders, Black Lion's of Georgia, have won the three previous tournaments. Last seasons runner-up, Tel Aviv Heat are not competing in this seasons competition.

== Description ==
The competition will take place without the two-time runner-up, the Tel Aviv Heat, due to ″various logistical elements″. The main change from last season's format in Pool A is that there will now be no semi-finals with the competition concluding after the group matches.

== Teams ==
Location of teams of the 2024 Rugby Europe Super Cup.

Nation	Stadium			Head coach	Captain
Nation	Home stadium	Capacity	Location	Head coach	Captain
(Georgia (country)) Black Lion	Avchala Stadium	2,500	Tbilisi	(England) Richard Cockerill	Merab Sharikadze
(Czech Republic) Bohemia Rugby Warriors	Rugby Arena Tatra Smíchov	n/a	Prague	(Czech Republic) Antonín Brabec and Jan Oswald	Patrik Prucha
(Belgium) Brussels Devils	Stade Communal de Soignies	1,000	Brussels	(Belgium) Sébastien Guns	Robin Vermeersch
(Spain) Castilla y León Iberians	San Amaro Stadium	1,500	Burgos	(Spain) Miguel Velasco	Mario Pichardie
(Netherlands) Delta	NRCA Stadium	10,000	Amsterdam	(South Africa) Gareth Gilbert	Vikas Meijer
(Portugal) Lusitanos	Estádio Nacional	500	Lisbon	(France) Sébastien Bertrank	Tomás Appleton
(Romania) Romanian Wolves	Arcul de Triumf	8,207	Bucharest	(Romania) Eugen Apjok	Nicolaas Immelman

== Pool A ==
Key to colours
Champions

Pos.	Team	Games				Points			Tries			TBP	LBP	Table points
Pos.	Team	Played	Won	Drawn	Lost	For	Against	Diff	For	Against	Diff	TBP	LBP	Table points
1	(Georgia (country)) Black Lion	4	4	0	0	175	38	+137	27	5	+21	4	0	20
2	(Portugal) Lusitanos	4	2	0	2	71	104	-33	9	16	-7	1	0	9
3	(Spain) Castilla y León Iberians	4	0	0	4	54	158	-104	7	22	-15	0	0	0
Points were awarded to the teams as follows: Win – 4 points | Draw – 2 points | At least 3 more tries than opponent – 1 point | Loss within 7 points – 1 point

=== Round 1 ===
7 September 2024
17:00 WEST (UTC+01)

(1 TBP) Lusitanos (Portugal)	36–18	(Spain) Castilla y León Iberians
	n/a

Estádio Nacional, Lisbon
Attendance: n/a
Referee: (Georgia (country)) Nika Amashukeli

=== Round 2 ===
15 September 2024
11:00 CEST (UTC+02)

Castilla y León Iberians (Spain)	3–54	(Georgia (country)) Black Lion (1 TBP)
	Report

San Amaro Stadium, Burgos
Attendance: n/a
Referee: (Ireland) Keane Davison

=== Round 3 ===
21 September 2024
17:00 WEST (UTC+01)

Lusitanos (Portugal)	17–38	(Georgia (country)) Black Lion (1 TBP)
	Report

Estádio Nacional, Lisbon
Attendance: 200
Referee: (Italy) Alex Frasson

=== Round 4 ===
28 September 2024
17:30 GET (UTC+04)

(1 TBP) Black Lion (Georgia (country))	47–21	(Spain) Castilla y León Iberians
	Report

Avchala Stadium, Tbilisi
Attendance: 1,000
Referee: (Romania) Alexandru Ionescu

=== Round 5 ===
12 October 2024
18:00 GET (UTC+04)

(1 TBP) Black Lion (Georgia (country))	36–0	(Portugal) Lusitanos
	Report

Avchala Stadium, Tbilisi
Attendance: 650
Referee: (France) Kevin Bralley

=== Round 6 ===
20 October 2024
11:00 CEST (UTC+02)

Castilla y León Iberians (Spain)	12–21	(Portugal) Lusitanos
	Report

San Amaro Stadium, Burgos
Attendance: 100
Referee: (Scotland) Jonny Perriam

== Pool B ==
Key to colours
Finals

Pos.	Team	Games				Points			Tries			TBP	LBP	Table points
Pos.	Team	Played	Won	Drawn	Lost	For	Against	Diff	For	Against	Diff	TBP	LBP	Table points
1	(Netherlands) Delta	3	3	0	0	109	56	+53	14	9	+5	2	0	14
2	(Romania) Romanian Wolves	3	2	0	1	118	77	+41	17	9	+8	2	1	11
3	(Belgium) Brussels Devils	3	1	0	2	64	102	-38	10	15	-5	0	0	4
4	(Czech Republic) Bohemia Rugby Warriors	3	0	0	3	43	99	-56	5	14	-9	0	0	0
Points were awarded to the teams as follows: Win – 4 points | Draw – 2 points | At least 3 more tries than opponent – 1 point | Loss within 7 points – 1 point

=== Round 1 ===
14 September 2024
18:00 CEST (UTC+02)

(1 TBP) Delta (Netherlands)	43–10	(Belgium) Brussels Devils
	Report

NRCA Stadium, Amsterdam
Attendance: 1,000
Referee: (Romania) Nicolae Fratila

15 September 2024
19:00 CEST (UTC+02)

Bohemia Rugby Warriors (Czech Republic)	18–38	(Romania) Romanian Wolves (1 TBP)
	Report

Rugby Arena Tatra Smíchov, Prague
Attendance: 400
Referee: (Netherlands) Gert Vesser

=== Round 2 ===
21 September 2024
11:30 EEST (UTC+03)

(1 LBP) Romanian Wolves (Romania)	36–37	(Netherlands) Delta
	Report

Arcul de Triumf, Bucharest
Attendance: 750
Referee: (Georgia (country)) Saba Abulashvili

21 September 2024
16:00 CEST (UTC+02)

Brussels Devils (Belgium)	32–15	(Czech Republic) Bohemia Rugby Warriors
	Report

Stade Communal de Soignies, Soignies
Attendance: 350
Referee: (Moldova) Eugeniu Procopi

=== Round 3 ===
27 September 2024
18:30 CEST (UTC+02)

(1 TBP) Delta (Netherlands)	29–10	(Czech Republic) Bohemia Rugby Warriors
	Report

NRCA Stadium, Amsterdam
Attendance: 100
Referee: (Portugal) Diogo Miranda

28 September 2024
14:00 EEST (UTC+03)

(1 TBP) Romanian Wolves (Romania)	44–22	(Belgium) Brussels Devils
	Report

Arcul de Triumf, Bucharest
Attendance: 1,000
Referee: (Spain) Luis Fernandes

=== Finals ===
==== 4th place final ====
19 October 2024
13:00 CEST (UTC+02)

Delta (Netherlands)	24–46	(Romania) Romanian Wolves
	Report

NRCA Stadium, Amsterdam
Attendance: 400
Referee: (Portugal) Paulo Duarte

==== 6th place final ====
19 October 2024
17:00 CEST (UTC+02)

Brussels Devils (Belgium)	24–20	(Czech Republic) Bohemia Rugby Warriors
	Report

Stade Communal de Soignies, Soignies
Attendance: 300
Referee: (Spain) Inigo Atorrasagasti

== See also ==
- 2024–25 European Rugby Champions Cup
- 2024–25 EPCR Challenge Cup
