= Time in Georgia =

Time in Georgia could refer to:

- Georgia Time (UTC+4), observed in the sovereign state of Georgia
- Eastern Time Zone (UTC-5 or UTC-4), observed in the state of Georgia, United States
