= 2022 Rugby Europe Super Cup =

Rugby Union Competition

Tournament details
- Countries: Belgium; Georgia; Israel; Netherlands; Portugal; Romania; Spain
- Date: 10 September - 17 December 2022

Tournament statistics
- Teams: 8
- Matches played: 27
- Attendance: 16,275 (603 per match)
- Highest attendance: 1,900
- Lowest attendance: 200
- Tries scored: 169 (6.26 per match)

Final
- Champions: (Georgia (country)) Black Lion (2nd title)
- Runners-up: (Israel) Tel Aviv Heat

The 2022 Rugby Europe Super Cup was the second edition of the Rugby Europe Super Cup, an annual rugby union competition for professional franchises outside the three 'big leagues' of European Rugby. The competition featured two new teams, the Romanian Wolves and RC Batumi from Georgia.

== Format ==
Each participant played home and away-fixtures in six rounds of action, to be played between September and December. At the end of the pool stage, the top two teams from each conference qualified for the semi-finals, with the conference winners hosting the ties.

== Teams ==
Nation	Stadium			Head coach	Captain
Nation	Home stadium	Capacity	Location	Head coach	Captain
(Georgia (country)) Batumi RC	Batumi Rugby Arena	1,500	Batumi	(Georgia (country)) Irakli Ninidze	Giorgi Tkhilaishvili
(Georgia (country)) Black Lion	Aia Arena; Avchala Stadium	5,000; 2,500	Kutaisi; Tbilisi	(Georgia (country)) Levan Maisashvili	Merab Sharikadze
(Belgium) Brussels Devils	Nelson Mandela Stadium	750	Brussels	(Belgium) Thibaut André	Viktor Pazgrat
(Spain) Castilla y León Iberians	Estadio Pepe Rojo	5,000	Valladolid	(Spain) Miguel Velasco	Silvio Castiglioni
(Netherlands) Delta	RC Eemland Stadium	500	Amsterdam	(Netherlands) Allard Jonkers	Hugo Langelaan
(Portugal) Lusitanos	CAR Jamor	2,500	Lisbon	(France) Patrice Lagisquet	João Belo
(Romania) Romanian Wolves	Arcul de Triumf	8,207	Bucharest	(New Zealand) Sosene Anesi	Ovidiu Cojocaru
(Israel) Tel Aviv Heat	Shlomo Bituach Stadium	11,500	Petah Tikva	(South Africa) Kevin Musikanth	Jordan Chait

Location of teams of the 2022–23 Rugby Europe Super Cup.

== Group stage ==
=== Eastern Conference ===
Advances to semi-finals

Pos.	Team	Games				Points			Tries			TBP	LBP	Table points
Pos.	Team	Played	Won	Drawn	Lost	For	Against	Diff	For	Against	Diff	TBP	LBP	Table points
1	(Georgia (country)) Black Lion	6	4	1	1	201	79	+122	30	7	+23	4	1	23
2	(Israel) Tel Aviv Heat	6	4	1	1	165	95	+70	21	12	+9	1	0	19
3	(Georgia (country)) Batumi RC	6	2	0	4	68	142	-74	9	17	-8	1	0	9
4	(Romania) Romanian Wolves	6	1	0	5	92	210	-118	9	30	-21	0	1	5
Points were awarded to the teams as follows: Win – 4 points | Draw – 2 points | At least 3 more tries than opponent – 1 point | Loss within 7 points – 1 point

==== Round 1 ====
10 September 2022
19:00 EEST (UTC+02:00)

(1 LBP) Romanian Wolves (Romania)	20 – 25	(Israel) Tel Aviv Heat
	Report

Arcul de Triumf, Bucharest
Attendance: 1000
Referee: (Georgia (country)) Giga Mshvenieradze

11 September 2022
16:30 GET (UTC+04)

Batumi RC (Georgia (country))	3 – 29	(Georgia (country)) Black Lion (1 TBP)
	Report

Batumi Rugby Arena, Batumi
Attendance: 1,800
Referee: (France) Adrien Marbot

==== Round 2 ====
17 September 2022
16:00 EEST (UTC+03)

Romanian Wolves (Romania)	37 – 15	(Georgia (country)) Batumi RC
	Report

Arcul de Triumf, Bucharest
Attendance: 1,000
Referee: (Portugal) Paulo Duarte

18 September 2022
16:30 GET (UTC+04)

Black Lion (Georgia (country))	25 – 25	(Israel) Tel Aviv Heat
	Report

Aia Arena, Kutaisi
Attendance: 800
Referee: (Italy) Filippo Russo

==== Round 3 ====
24 September 2022
15:00 GET (UTC+04)

Batumi RC (Georgia (country))	19 – 11	(Israel) Tel Aviv Heat
	Report

Batumi Rugby Arena, Batumi
Attendance: 250
Referee: (Romania) Alexandru Ionescu

25 September 2022
16:00 GET (UTC+04)

(1 TBP) Black Lion (Georgia (country))	43 – 21	(Romania) Romanian Wolves
	Report

Aia Arena, Kutaisi
Attendance: 850
Referee: (Ireland) Andrew Cole

==== Round 4 ====
15 October 2022
14:30 GET (UTC+04)

(1 TBP) Batumi RC (Georgia (country))	23 – 3	(Romania) Romanian Wolves
	Report

Batumi Rugby Arena, Batumi
Attendance: 500
Referee: (Spain) Iñigo Atorrasagasti

16 October 2022
14:00 IDT (UTC+03)

Tel Aviv Heat (Israel)	24 – 18	(Georgia (country)) Black Lion (1 LBP)
	Report

Shlomo Bituach Stadium, Petah Tikva
Attendance: 400
Referee: (Portugal) Paulo Duarte

==== Round 5 ====
22 October 2022
11:30 IDT (UTC+03)

Tel Aviv Heat (Israel)	25 – 8	(Georgia (country)) Batumi RC
	Report

Shlomo Bituach Stadium, Petah Tikva
Attendance: 400
Referee: (Romania) Cristian Șerban

23 October 2022
18:00 EEST (UTC+03:00)

Romanian Wolves (Romania)	6 – 49	(Georgia (country)) Black Lion (1 TBP)
	Report

Arcul de Triumf, Bucharest
Attendance: 500
Referee: (Italy) Federico Vedovelli

==== Round 6 ====
29 October 2022
16:00 GET (UTC+04)

Black Lion (Georgia (country))	37 – 0	(Georgia (country)) Batumi RC
	Report

Avchala Stadium, Tbilisi
Attendance: 550
Referee: (Ireland) Andrew Cole

30 October 2022
TBC IST (UTC+02)

(1 TBP) Tel Aviv Heat (Israel)	55 – 5	(Romania) Romanian Wolves
	Report

Shlomo Bituach Stadium, Petah Tikva
Attendance: 500
Referee: (Netherlands) Gert Visser

=== Western Conference ===
Advances to semi-finals

Pos.	Team	Games				Points			Tries			TBP	LBP	Table points
Pos.	Team	Played	Won	Drawn	Lost	For	Against	Diff	For	Against	Diff	TBP	LBP	Table points
1	(Portugal) Lusitanos	6	5	0	1	297	66	+231	38	8	+30	3	1	24
2	(Spain) Castilla y León Iberians	6	5	0	1	189	71	+118	28	9	+19	3	1	24
3	(Belgium) Brussels Devils	6	1	0	5	75	322	-247	10	42	-32	1	1	6
4	(Netherlands) Delta	6	1	0	5	95	197	-102	8	22	-14	0	1	5
Points were awarded to the teams as follows: Win – 4 points | Draw – 2 points | At least 3 more tries than opponent – 1 point | Loss within 7 points – 1 point | Completing a Grand Slam – 1 point

==== Round 1 ====
10 September 2022
15:00 CEST (UTC+02)

Brussels Devils (Belgium)	3 – 61	(Spain) Castilla y León Iberians (1 TBP)
	Report

Nelson Mandela Stadium, Brussels
Attendance: 250
Referee: (Germany) Kilian O'Brien

11 September 2022
12:30 CEST (UTC+02)

(1 LBP) Delta (Netherlands)	19 – 26	(Portugal) Lusitanos
	Report

RC Eemland, Amersfoort
Attendance: 300
Referee: (Romania) Cristian Șerban

==== Round 2 ====
17 September 2022
17:00 WEST (UTC+01)

(1 TBP) Lusitanos (Portugal)	95 – 0	(Belgium) Brussels Devils
	Report

Estádio Nacional, Lisbon
Attendance: 200
Referee: (Spain) Iñigo Atorrasagasti

18 September 2022
12:00 CEST (UTC+02)

Castilla y León Iberians (Spain)	22 – 7	(Netherlands) Delta
	Report

Estadio Pepe Rojo, Valladolid
Attendance: 800
Referee: (Belgium) John Catteau

==== Round 3 ====
24 September 2022
15:30 CEST (UTC+02)

Delta (Netherlands)	21 – 14	(Belgium) Brussels Devils (1 LBP)
	Report

RC Eemland, Amersfoort
Attendance: 175
Referee: (Switzerland) Ethan Glass

24 September 2022
18:00 CEST (UTC+02)

(1 LBP) Castilla y León Iberians (Spain)	20 – 22	(Portugal) Lusitanos
	Report

Estadio Pepe Rojo, Valladolid
Attendance: 500
Referee: (Georgia (country)) Saba Abulashvili

==== Round 4 ====
15 October 2022
16:30 WEST (UTC+01)

(1 LBP) Lusitanos (Portugal)	12 – 17	(Spain) Castilla y León Iberians
	Report

Estádio Nacional, Lisbon
Attendance: 200
Referee: (Georgia (country)) Shota Tevzadze

15 October 2022
20:00 CEST (UTC+02)

(1 TBP) Brussels Devils (Belgium)	48 – 21	(Netherlands) Delta
	Report

Nelson Mandela Stadium, Brussels
Attendance: 600
Referee: (Georgia (country)) Saba Abulashvili

==== Round 5 ====
22 October 2022
13:00 CEST (UTC+02)

Delta (Netherlands)	17 – 40	(Spain) Castilla y León Iberians (1 TBP)
	Report

RC Eemland, Amersfoort
Attendance: 300
Referee: (Romania) Alexandru Ionescu

22 October 2022
15:30 CEST (UTC+02)

Brussels Devils (Belgium)	0 – 95	(Portugal) Lusitanos (1 TBP)
	Report

Nelson Mandela Stadium, Brussels
Attendance: 600
Referee: (Ireland) Keane Davison

==== Round 6 ====
28 October 2022
20:00 WEST (UTC+01)

(1 TBP) Lusitanos (Portugal)	47 – 10	(Netherlands) Delta
	Report

Estádio Nacional, Lisbon
Attendance: 200
Referee: (Italy) Alex Frasson

30 October 2022
12:20 CET (UTC+01)

(1 TBP) Castilla y León Iberians (Spain)	29 – 10	(Belgium) Brussels Devils
	Report

Estadio Pepe Rojo, Valladolid
Attendance: 900
Referee: (Scotland) Michael Todd

== Play-Offs ==
Semi-finals
4 December – Tbilisi
(Georgia (country)) The Black Lion	41
(Spain) Castilla y León Iberians	9
4 December – Lisbon
(Portugal) Lusitanos XV	22
(Israel) Tel Aviv Heat	30

Final
17 December – Tbilisi
(Georgia (country)) The Black Lion	29
(Israel) Tel Aviv Heat	17

=== Semi-finals ===
4 December 2022
16:00 GET (UTC+04)

Black Lion (Georgia (country))	41 – 9	(Spain) Castilla y León Iberians
	Report

Avchala Stadium, Tbilisi
Attendance: 600
Referee: (Italy) Federico Vedovelli

4 December 2022
15:00 WET (UTC+00)

Lusitanos (Portugal)	22 – 30	(Israel) Tel Aviv Heat
	Report

Estádio Nacional, Lisbon
Attendance: 200
Referee: (Georgia (country)) Shota Tevzadze

=== Final ===
17 December 2022
16:00 GET (UTC+04)

Black Lion (Georgia (country))	29 – 17	(Israel) Tel Aviv Heat
	Report

Avchala Stadium, Tbilisi
Attendance: 1,900
Referee: (Portugal) Paulo Duarte
