= 2021–22 Rugby Europe Super Cup =

Rugby Union Competition

Tournament details
- Countries: Belgium; Georgia; Israel; Netherlands; Portugal; Russia; Spain
- Date: 18 September 2021 – 7 May 2022

Tournament statistics
- Teams: 8
- Matches played: 27
- Attendance: 12,063 (447 per match)
- Highest attendance: 1,000
- Lowest attendance: 130
- Tries scored: 185 (6.85 per match)

Final
- Champions: (Georgia (country)) The Black Lion (1st title)
- Runners-up: (Portugal) Lusitanos XV

The 2021–22 Rugby Europe Super Cup is the first edition of the Rugby Europe Super Cup, an annual rugby union competition for professional franchises and clubs outside the three 'big leagues' of European Rugby.

Each participant will play home and away-fixtures in six rounds of action played between September and December. At the end of the pool stage, the top two teams of each conference will qualify for the semi-finals, which will be played during April 2022, with the conference winners hosting the ties.

The final between Lusitanos XV representing Lisbon, Portugal, and The Black Lion representing Tbilisi, Georgia, took place on 7 May 2022 to crown the inaugural champion of the Rugby Europe Super Cup. Georgian professional side The Black Lion took the crown.

== Group stage ==
Eight clubs or franchises, representing seven nations took part in the initial group stage; two from Russia, and one each from Georgia and Israel (the four forming the Eastern Conference) and one each from the Netherlands, Spain, Belgium and Portugal (forming the Western Conference). As a result of the Russian invasion of Ukraine, the Russian franchises were excluded from the latter parts of the competition.

=== Eastern conference ===
Team	P	W	D	L	PF	PA	Diff	TF	TA	TDiff	TB	LB	Pts
(Georgia (country)) The Black Lion	5	4	0	1	155	88	+67	19	10	+9	3	1	20
(Israel) Tel Aviv Heat^{[b]}	6	3	0	3	165	187	−22	22	24	−2	1	1	14
(Russia) Yenisey-STM^{[a]}	5	3	0	2	151	119	+32	21	14	+7	2	2	16
(Russia) Lokomotiv Penza^{[a]}	6	1	0	5	94	171	−77	9	23	−14	0	1	5
^{a} Disqualified due to Russian invasion of Ukraine^{b} Tel Aviv Heat advanced to Semi Final after Yenisey-STM's disqualification

==== Round 1 ====
19 September 2021
18:00 KRAT (UTC+07)

(1 TBP) Yenisey-STM (Russia)	22 – 6	(Russia) Lokomotiv Penza
	Report

Avangard Stadium, Krasnoyarsk
Attendance: 1,000
Referee: (Romania) Alexandru Ionescu

16 October 2021 (Note: Due to the COVID-19 travel restrictions, the match was postponed to a later date.)
17:00 GET (UTC+04)

(1 TBP) The Black Lion (Georgia (country))	33 – 10	(Israel) Tel Aviv Heat
	Report

Avchala Stadium, Tbilisi
Attendance: 0
Referee: (Russia) Alexey Lebedev

==== Round 2 ====
25 September 2021
16:30 MSK (UTC+03)

Lokomotiv Penza (Russia)	21 – 44	(Russia) Yenisey-STM (1 TBP)
	Report

Pervomayskiy Stadium, Penza
Attendance: 400
Referee: (Italy) Vincenzo Schipani

18 December 2021
20:00 IST (UTC+02)

Tel Aviv Heat (Israel)	28 – 52	(Georgia (country)) The Black Lion (1 TBP)
	Report

Shlomo Bituach Stadium, Petah Tikva
Attendance: 1,000
Referee: (Italy) Manuel Bottino

==== Round 3 ====
23 October 2021
12:30 MSK (UTC+03)

Lokomotiv Penza (Russia)	11 – 27	(Georgia (country)) The Black Lion (1 TBP)
	Report

Pervomayskiy Stadium, Penza
Attendance: 0
Referee: (Portugal) Paulo Duarte

23 October 2021
14:30 MSK (UTC+03)

(1 LBP) Yenisey-STM (Russia)	31 – 34	(Israel) Tel Aviv Heat
	Report

Slava Stadium, Moscow
Attendance: 400
Referee: (Scotland) Ian Kenny

==== Round 4 ====
30 October 2021
14:00 MSK (UTC+03)

(1 LBP) Lokomotiv Penza (Russia)	23 – 29	(Israel) Tel Aviv Heat
	Report

Mordovia Arena, Saransk
Attendance: 500
Referee: (Spain) Iñigo Atorrasagasti

N/A
N/A

Yenisey-STM (Russia)	Cancelled	(Georgia (country)) The Black Lion
	N/A

N/A
Attendance: N/A
Referee: N/A

==== Round 5 ====
4 December 2021
16:00 GET (UTC+04)

(1 LBP) The Black Lion (Georgia (country))	16 – 19	(Russia) Lokomotiv Penza
	Report

Avchala Stadium, Tbilisi
Attendance: n/a
Referee: (Romania) Cristian Serban

15 December 2021
20:00 GET (UTC+04)

(1 LBP) Tel Aviv Heat (Israel)	31 – 34	(Russia) Yenisey-STM
	Report

Avchala Stadium, Tbilisi (Note: Originally meant to be played in Israel, moved to Georgia due to the COVID-19 travel restrictions.)
Attendance: 0
Referee: (Georgia (country)) Shota Tevzadze

==== Round 6 ====
10 December 2021
14:00 GET (UTC+04)

(1 TBP) Tel Aviv Heat (Israel)	33 – 14	(Russia) Lokomotiv Penza
	Report

Rustavi Stadium, Rustavi
Attendance: 130
Referee: (Portugal) Paulo Duarte

11 December 2021
17:00 GET (UTC+04)

The Black Lion (Georgia (country))	27 – 20	(Russia) Yenisey-STM (1 LBP)
	Report

Avchala Stadium, Tbilisi
Attendance: 400
Referee: (Romania) Alexandru Ionescu

=== Western conference ===
Team	P	W	D	L	PF	PA	Diff	TF	TA	TDiff	TB	LB	Pts
(Portugal) Lusitanos XV	6	6	0	0	257	67	+190	35	7	+28	5	0	29
(Spain) Castilla y León Iberians	6	4	0	2	205	101	+104	28	12	+16	3	1	20
(Netherlands) The Delta	6	1	0	5	106	195	−89	16	34	−18	1	2	7
(Belgium) Brussels Devils	6	1	0	5	77	256	−179	9	36	−27	0	0	4

==== Round 1 ====
18 September 2021
15:30 CEST (UTC+02)

(1 TBP) The Delta (Netherlands)	34 – 13	(Belgium) Brussels Devils
	Report

RC Eemland, Amersfoort
Attendance: 500
Referee: (Spain) Iñigo Atorrasagasti

18 September 2021
17:00 WEST (UTC+01)

(1 TBP) Lusitanos XV (Portugal)	34 – 19	(Spain) Castilla y León Iberians
	Report

Estádio Nacional, Lisbon
Attendance: 600
Referee: (France) Jonathan Dufort

==== Round 2 ====
25 September 2021
18:00 CEST (UTC+02)

Brussels Devils (Belgium)	27 – 21	(Netherlands) The Delta (1 LBP)
	Report

Nelson Mandela Stadium, Brussels
Attendance: 500
Referee: (Romania) Cristian Șerban

26 September 2021
12:00 CEST (UTC+02)

(1 LBP) Castilla y León Iberians (Spain)	13 – 20	(Portugal) Lusitanos XV
	Report

Estadio Pepe Rojo, Valladolid
Attendance: 1,000
Referee: (Georgia (country)) Shota Tevzadze

==== Round 3 ====
23 October 2021
15:30 CEST (UTC+02)

The Delta (Netherlands)	7 – 50	(Portugal) Lusitanos XV (1 TBP)
	Report

RC Eemland, Amersfoort
Attendance: 500
Referee: (Russia) Georgiy Kopp

24 October 2021
12:30 CEST (UTC+02)

Brussels Devils (Belgium)	7 – 47	(Spain) Castilla y León Iberians (1 TBP)
	Report

Nelson Mandela Stadium, Brussels
Attendance: 500
Referee: (Ireland) Dan Carson

==== Round 4 ====
30 October 2021
15:00 CEST (UTC+02)

The Delta (Netherlands)	7 – 41	(Spain) Castilla y León Iberians (1 TBP)
	Report

RC Eemland, Amersfoort
Attendance: 300
Referee: (Italy) Manuel Bottino

30 October 2021
18:00 CEST (UTC+02)

Brussels Devils (Belgium)	13 – 38	(Portugal) Lusitanos XV (1 TBP)
	Report

Nelson Mandela Stadium, Brussels
Attendance: 0
Referee: (Georgia (country)) Saba Abulashvili

==== Round 5 ====
4 December 2021
15:00 WET (UTC+00)

(1 TBP) Lusitanos XV (Portugal)	53 – 14	(Belgium) Brussels Devils
	Report

Estádio Nacional, Lisbon
Attendance: 600
Referee: (Italy) Federico Vedovelli

5 December 2021
12:30 CET (UTC+01)

Castilla y León Iberians (Spain)	32 – 30	(Netherlands) The Delta (1 LBP)
	Report

Estadio Pepe Rojo, Valladolid
Attendance: 500
Referee: (Ireland) Andrew Cole

==== Round 6 ====
11 December 2021
12:00 CET (UTC+01)

(1 TBP) Castilla y León Iberians (Spain)	53 – 3	(Belgium) Brussels Devils
	Report

Estadio Pepe Rojo, Valladolid
Attendance: 700
Referee: (Netherlands) Gert Visser

11 December 2021
15:00 WET (UTC+00)

(1 TBP) Lusitanos XV (Portugal)	62 – 7	(Netherlands) The Delta
	Report

Estádio Nacional, Lisbon
Attendance: 1,000
Referee: (Switzerland) Ethan Glass

== Play-Offs ==
Semi-finals
16 April – Lisbon
(Portugal) Lusitanos XV	42
(Israel) Tel Aviv Heat	26
17 April – Tbilisi
(Georgia (country)) The Black Lion	43
(Spain) Castilla y León Iberians	40

Final
7 May 2022 – Lisbon
(Portugal) Lusitanos XV	14
(Georgia (country)) The Black Lion	17

=== Semi-finals ===
16 April 2022
15:00 WEST (UTC+01)

Lusitanos XV (Portugal)	42 – 26	(Israel) Tel Aviv Heat
	Report

Estádio Nacional, Lisbon
Attendance: 600
Referee: (Georgia (country)) Shota Tevzadze

17 April 2022
18:00 GET (UTC+04)

The Black Lion (Georgia (country))	43 – 40	(Spain) Castilla y León Iberians
	Report

Avchala Stadium, Tbilisi
Attendance: 933
Referee: (Italy) Federico Vedovelli

=== Final ===
7 May 2022
15:00 WEST (UTC+01)

Lusitanos XV (Portugal)	14 – 17	(Georgia (country)) The Black Lion
	Report

Jamor High Performance Sport Centre, Lisbon
Attendance: n/a
Referee: (Ireland) Peter Martin
