= Ionuț Dimofte =

Romania international rugby union player

- Born: Tiberius Ionuț Dimofte; 30 September 1984 (age 42) Suceava, Romania
- Height: 1.86 m (6 ft 1 in)
- Weight: 99 kg (218 lb; 15.6 st)

Rugby union career
- Position(s): Fly-half, Fullback
Senior career
| Years | Team | Apps | (Points) |
- București Wolves
International career
| Years | Team | Apps | (Points) |
| 2004– | Romania | 60 | (87) |

Tiberius Ionuț Dimofte (born 30 September 1984, in Suceava) is a Romanian rugby union footballer. He plays for the Romanian team, Baia Mare. He also plays for the București Wolves in the European Challenge Cup.

Dimofte played all the four games for his country at the 2007 Rugby World Cup, scoring a conversion and two penalties in the narrow 18-24 defeat against Italy. He also played at the 2011 Rugby World Cup.
