= Cornel Tatu =

Romanian rugby union footballer and coach

- Born: Florin-Cornel Tatu; 12 July 1983 (age 43) Sibiu, Romania
- Height: 6 ft 5 in (196 cm)
- Weight: 217 lb (98 kg)
- University: Universitatea Ecologică din București

Rugby union career
- Position: Flanker
Senior career
Years	Team	Apps	(Points)
2002–16	Steaua București		
2016–17	Stejarul Buzău		
Provincial / State sides
Years	Team	Apps	(Points)
2004–15	București Wolves	16	(0)
International career
Years	Team	Apps	(Points)
2003–2013	Romania	12	(0)

Cornel Tatu (born 12 July 1983) is a former Romanian rugby union football player and currently a coach. He played as a flanker.

== Club career ==
During his career, Tatu played mostly for Steaua București in Romania and for București Wolves a Romanian professional rugby union team based in Bucharest that competed in the European Rugby Challenge Cup competition. He ended his career at Stejarul Buzău.

== International career ==
Tatu gathered 12 caps for Romania, from his debut in 2003 against Argentina to his last game in 2013 against Spain. He was a member of his national side for the 6th Rugby World Cup in 2003, where he played a single match in Pool A against Argentina, which was his debut for the Oaks.

== Honours ==
Steaua București

- SuperLiga: 2003, 2005, 2006
- Romanian Cup: 2006, 2007, 2013
