= Castilla y León Iberians =

Spanish rugby union team

(Spain) Castilla y León
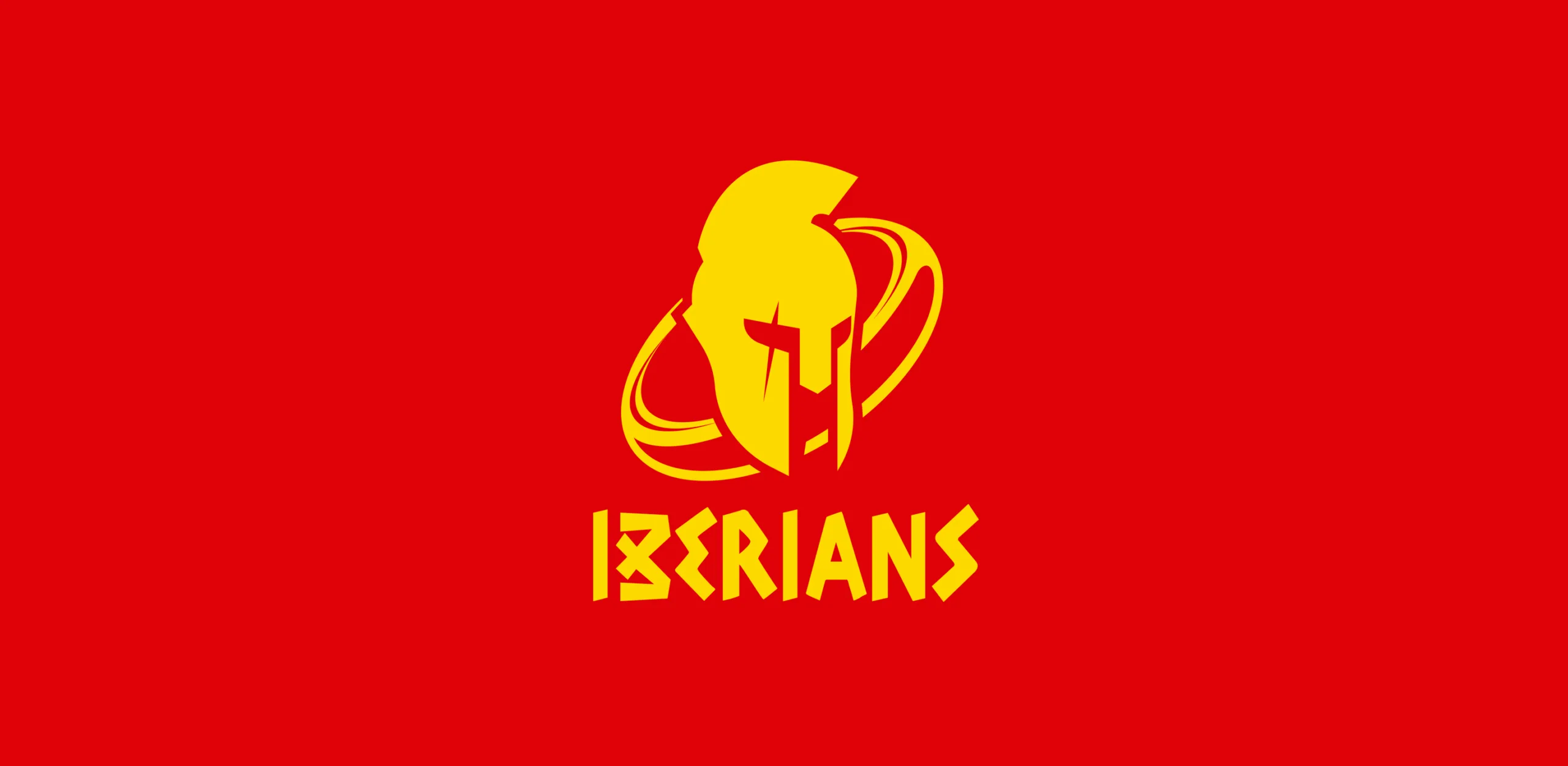
- Full name: Castilla y León Iberians
- Founded: 2021; 5 years ago
- Location: Castilla y León, Spain
- Ground: Estadio Nueva Balastera (Capacity: 8,100)
- Coach: Raúl Pérez
- League: Rugby Europe Super Cup
- 2025-26: Champions
1st kit	2nd kit

Official website
- www.iberiansrugby.com
- Current season

The Castilla y León Iberians is a professional Spanish rugby union team based in the Castile and León region. They competed annually in the Rugby Europe Super Cup, until season 2025–26, when they won the title for the first time.

== History ==
The franchise was founded in 2021 as the Spanish representative in the Rugby Europe Super Cup. The Castilla y Leon Iberians originally took players from three Castile and León teams that play in the domestic División de Honor championship: VRAC, El Salvador, and Aparejadores.

The Rugby Europe Super Cup competition initially featured eight teams separated into two conferences of four.

For the 2021–22 season, the Iberians were placed in the Western Conference alongside Brussels Devils of Belgium, Delta of the Netherlands, and Lusitanos of Portugal.

The Iberians qualified for the semifinals, losing to Georgia's Black Lion 43-40.

The following season was almost identical, with the Iberians finishing second in the West Conference, only to lose to Black Lion 41-9.

For the 2023 season, the team was taken over by the Spanish Rugby Federation and the selection pool was extended from local clubs to Spanish-qualified players aged 20-24 at any club.

The tournament format also experienced a change, as the four best teams were grouped together in Pool A, with the top three qualifying for the semifinals. The Iberians competed against Black Lion, Tel Aviv Heat and Lusitanos. They finished third before losing to Black Lion at the semifinal stage for the third consecutive season.

The Iberians had their worst season in 2024, as Tel Aviv Heat's absence meant they had to play four group games against Black Lion and Lusitanos. They lost all four and did not qualify for the semifinals for the first time.

Before the 2025-26 tournament, the purpose of the Iberians was altered once again. Instead of concentrating exclusively on Spain's best young players, the club widened its focus to become a development team for Spain's national side, meaning the country's best players, regardless of age, were chosen. The Iberians' form duly improved, and they took advantage of Black Lion's withdrawal from the competition to top the new league format after three games.

== Home ground ==
The Iberians initially played at Estadio Pepe Rojo in Valladolid, the stadium shared by VRAC and El Salvador, before moving to the San Amaro Stadium, home of Aparejadores, for the 2024 season.

As of the 2025–26 season, the team plays at the Estadio Nueva Balastera in Palencia. The stadium is shared with Palencia CF, a football club competing in Spain's Tercera Federación.

== Squad ==
The team's current squad was announced in October 2025.

Player	Club
Vicente Del Hoyo	Les Abelles
Raúl Calzón	VRAC
Pablo Miejimolle	VRAC
Santi Ovejero	Aparejadores
Cristian Moreno	Pozuelo
Lucas Santamaría	Liceo Francés
Thierry Futeu	Liceo Francés
Pablo Guirao	Alcobendas
Antonio Suárez	Alcobendas
Imanol Urraza	Aparejadores
Matt Foulds	Santboiana
Vicente Boronat	Aparejadores
Pepe Borraz	Complutense Cisneros
Valentino Rizzo	Complutense Cisneros
Álex Saleta	VRAC
Pablo Pérez	Barcelona
Estanislao Bay	Real Ciencias
Nico Infer	Complutense Cisneros
Gonzalo Vinuesa	Complutense Cisneros
Alvar Gimeno	Valencia
Yago Fernández	Alcobendas
Iñaki Mateu	Aparejadores
Martiniano Cian	VRAC
Beltrán Ortega	VRAC
Pau Aira	Barcelona
Egoitz García	Ordizia
Beau Peart	Gernika
Jaime Manteca	Pozuelo
John Wessel Bell	Hollywoodbets Harlequins

== See also ==
- Spain national rugby union team
- Rugby union in Spain
- Olympus Rugby XV Madrid
