= Romanian Wolves =

Romanian rugby union club, based in Bucharest

- Full name: Romanian Wolves
- Nickname: Lupii (The Wolves)
- Founded: June 9, 2004; 22 years ago as Selecționata București
- Location: Romania
- Ground: Arcul de Triumf Stadium (Capacity: 8,207)
- Coach: David Gérard
- Captain: Ovidiu Cojocaru
- Most appearances: Florin Vlaicu (57)
- Top scorer: Florin Vlaicu (314)
- Most tries: Cătălin Fercu (8)
- League: Rugby Europe Super Cup
- 2024: 4th
1st kit	2nd kit

The Romanian Wolves (Romanian: Lupii Români) is a professional Romanian rugby union team that competes annually in the Rugby Europe Super Cup.

== History ==
=== 2004-2008: Initial Stages - Test Team for the National Squad ===
At the end of the 2003-2004 season, both champions Dinamo Bucharest and runners-up Steaua Bucharest declined the opportunity to take part in European competitions next season, mainly for financial reasons. With this in mind, the Romanian Rugby Federation decided to patch things up and create a new representative team based in Bucharest named "Selecționata București" (which could be translated as "Bucharest Representative Team") or simply "București" (translated as "Bucharest") in order to be more competitive on the international stage. Essentially, the idea was to create a team that would bring together the most valuable rugby players from the domestic championship and test them, give them a chance to prove they could be part of the senior national rugby team, as well as providing some international experience for the up and coming local players. For this reason, the team was also known as "Romania A", a label that was fairly used in the Romanian sports media during the early years of the team's existence. (Note: This reference is an example of an online article where the label "Romania A" was used) The 2004-2005 season marked the Bucharest Representative Team's debut in Europe, albeit not in the European Challenge Cup, which they were eligible for after Dinamo Bucharest withdrew, but rather in the European Shield. (Note: The primary objective was to secure more time for the team's preparation and cohesion. This was primarily because the European Shield commenced in December–January, whereas the Challenge Cup had an earlier start in October. Moreover, it served as an opportunity to assess and prepare players who could potentially strengthen the national team for the ongoing European Nations Cup.) They played Leonessa Rugby from Italy in the opening round. On December 5, 2004, the Bucharest Representative Team played their debut match at the Steaua stadium in Ghencea and emerged victorious with a score of 18-15. Even with Valentin Ursache's red card elimination, the Romanians managed to achieve victory with points scored by Ion Teodorescu's try, Iulian Andrei's two penalties, and a transformation from a penalty try granted at the beginning of the second half. However, in the return match, Romania A lost with a score of 32-21, resulting in their failure to qualify for the next round. Despite Lacatus and Teodorescu's two attempts, the team paid tribute to indiscipline, yellow cards being given to Alexandru Lacatus, Cornel Tatu, and Florin Poenaru.

From the 2005-06 season onwards, the Bucharest Representative Team took part in the Amlin Challenge Cup. In this particular edition, the Romanian side was placed in a group alongside Gloucester, Bayonne, and Toulon. Despite facing five defeats, they experienced a notable triumph at Stade Félix Mayol against Toulon, securing a 23-17 victory. Players like Fercu, Ratiu, and Fercu once again, successfully scored three tries, with the last one being the decisive moment just three minutes before the game concluded.

In the 2006-07 season, the Romanians had a commendable performance in their group matches against Newport Dragons, Bristol, and Bayonne. They achieved a notable victory against Bayonne in Bucharest with a final score of 32-27, despite being behind 12-17 at halftime. Catalin Dascalu, Costica Mersoiu, and Catalin Fercu each scored a try, with Fercu's last one proving to be decisive. However, they faced defeats against Newport with scores of 29-39 and 10-66, and against Bristol with scores of 3-27 and 19-33. In the match against Bayonne, the Bucharest Representative Team fought hard but ultimately conceded with a score of 38-31, although Fercu managed to score three tries.

During the 2007-2008 season, Selectionata Bucuresti had their most successful participation on record. They achieved two victories and a draw in a group that included Worcester, Gran Parma, and Montauban. In Italy, they had a thrilling 23-23 draw against Gran Parma, with Stelian Burcea, Costica Mersoiu, and Vasile Rus scoring successful attempts. In the rematch, they narrowly won 21-20, with Gheorghita Bigiu and Ionut Dimofte each managing a try, and Florin Vlaicu contributing a conversion and three penalty kicks. Their second victory came against the French team Montauban, with a final score of 19-17. Dimofte scored a try, which was converted by Vlaicu, who also added points from four penalty kicks. It is worth noting that the Romanian international Bogdan Balan played for the opposing team.

=== 2008-2011: Taking on a Familiar Image - Adopting the Oak Leaf ===
Starting from the 2008-2009 season, the Bucharest Representative Team underwent a transformation and became known as the Bucharest Oaks. Competing alongside Bourgoin, Worcester, and Petrarca Padova, their performance was rather lackluster, with only one victory achieved during an away match against Padova. During the home game, we unfortunately succumbed to the Italians with a score of 14-20, as they managed to secure one try and Ludovic Mercier successfully converted five penalties. However, in a thrilling match held in Italy, Florin Vlaicu emerged as the hero by securing the winning points through a penalty kick in the 74th minute, leading the Oaks to a triumphant 17-15 victory.

In the 2009-10 edition, Bucharest Oaks secured just one victory. They emerged triumphant against Overmach Parma with a score of 21-9. The points were scored by Csaba Gal and Cosmin Ratiu through tries, Florin Vlaicu with a conversion and two penalties, and Ionut Dimofte with a drop goal. The Oaks also put up a commendable performance against the French team Bourgoin, narrowly losing with a score of 19-21 at the end of the game, after being tied 13-13 at halftime. A similar scenario unfolded in their match against Leeds at home, where they were leading 6-3 until the 70th minute but eventually lost with a score of 6-10. However, they experienced losses against Bourgoin resulting in a score of 15-33, Parma resulting in a score of 9-16 and a significant defeat against Leeds with a score 0-47.

During the 2010–11 season, they once again achieved the single victory feat in the pool stage of the Amlin Challenge Cup and also secured a narrow 20-19 win versus Crociati, with a try scored by Catalin Nicolae and five penalties successfully executed by Danut Dumbrava. Despite scoring two tries through Madalin Lemnaru and Stelian Burcea in the match against Stade Francais, they were defeated 20-29. Stade Francais boasted a formidable lineup including renowned players like Hugo Bonneval, Pascal Papé, Sergio Parisse, Julien Dupuy, and Mathieu Bastareaud.

=== 2011-2015: A Renewed Start - Wolves Replaces Oaks as the New Identity ===
In the summer of 2011, the Romanian Rugby Federation announced that they've decided to change the team's name from Bucharest Oaks to Bucharest Wolves in order to avoid confusion with the Romanian national team, also referred as "The Oaks." In the 2011-2012 edition of the Amlin Challenge Cup, the Bucharest Wolves were placed in a group with Stade Francais, Worcester, and Crociati and managed to secure two victories against the Italians. At the Arcul de Triumf stadium, they won 34-7 and obtained the offensive bonus thanks to Adrian Apostol's hat-trick and Florin Vlaicu's four successful conversions and two penalty kicks. In the return game, they replicated the same performance with a 26-13 victory, this time with Apostol, Flavius Dobre, and Florin Surugiu's double ensuring the offensive bonus. It's worth noting their impressive performance against Worcester in Bucharest, where they led 13-12 until the last quarter of the game, but unfortunately conceded two attempts and lost 13-24.

In the 2012-2013 edition of the Amlin Challenge Cup, the Bucharest Wolves were placed in a group alongside Bath, Agen, and Calvisano. Throughout the tournament, they were able to secure 2 wins out of 6 matches. One notable triumph was their victory against the French team Agen, which took place in Bucharest on December 8, 2012. This thrilling game was filled with intense moments, and it was ultimately decided by Florin Vlaicu's remarkable penalty kick from 45 meters on the left side, resulting in a final score of 25-22.

In the following season, the 2013-2014 Amlin Challenge Cup, the Romanians who were placed in Pool 3 alongside Newcastle Falcons, Brive and Calvisano, delivered a series of determined performances. At home, they faced Newcastle Falcons, leading 12-10 at halftime due to four penalty kicks from Valentin Calafeteanu but ultimately lost. Against Brive, the Wolves led in both legs. In the away match, Florin Vlaicu’s three penalties secured a halftime lead, but they fell short in the second half. On their own turf, they were ahead 13-9 until the 57th minute before Thomas Laranjeira’s precision sealed Brive's victory. Despite valiant efforts, the team struggled to secure victories but these performances underscored the team’s competitive spirit against top European opposition.

The 2014-2015 season saw Bucharest Wolves qualifying for the European Rugby Challenge Cup through the Rugby Europe play-off. They withstood Italian club and old foes Calvisano in a two-legged tie. The Wolves won the first leg 18-13 at home, held at the Stadionul Arcul de Triumf, and narrowly lost the second leg 13-10 in Italy. However, their aggregate score of 28-26 secured their place in Pool 3. In Pool 3, the Wolves faced stiff competition from Stade Français, Newport Gwent Dragons and Newcastle Falcons. It proved to be the most challenging european campaign to date and the team finished without a win, placing fourth in the group. Despite this, there were moments of resilience and strong individual performances. Notably, they pushed Stade Français to a close 13-9 defeat in Bucharest, with Florin Vlaicu contributing vital penalties. While outmatched in other fixtures, the Wolves demonstrated tenaciousness against high-caliber opponents.

=== 2015: Transition from Bucharest Wolves to Domestic Club Representation ===
After the 2014-2015 season, Bucharest Wolves ceased competing due to organizational changes in Romanian rugby. The decision was made by the Romanian Rugby Federation to replace the Wolves with the winner of Romania's domestic professional league, Liga Națională de Rugby, starting with the 2015-2016 season. This was part of an effort to improve the visibility and competitiveness of local club teams rather than fielding a selection-based side for international club tournaments. Among the factors was the reality of having the Wolves struggling to advance past the pool stages in their Challenge Cup history and them facing strives such as limited resources and difficulties in competing against stronger European club teams. Their final season in 2014-2015 saw them fail to win any of their matches, signaling an end to their run as a composite team.

=== 2022: The Resurgence of the Romanian Wolves in European Rugby ===
In 2022, the Wolves, previously inactive since 2015, revived as a competitive rugby team. Now labeled as Romanian Wolves, they entered the Rugby Europe Super Cup (RESC) marking a return to european club competition. This decision followed a strategic move by the Romanian Rugby Union (FRR) to boost the country's rugby development by creating a team that could help bridge the gap between emerging players and top-level international competition. Under the leadership of head coach Sosene Anesi, who at that time served as a backs coach for Romania's national team, the Romanian Wolves joined the RESC's Eastern Conference for the 2022 season. This league offered them the opportunity to compete against strong teams like the Tel Aviv Heat and sides from Georgia like the Black Lion and Rugby Club Batumi. This was a significant moment for Romanian rugby as it allowed their top players to compete at a higher level of intensity, helping with their growth and potentially improving the national team's performance in future international events.

Period	Name
2004–2008	Bucharest Representative Team
2008–2011	Bucharest Oaks
2011–2015	Bucharest Wolves
2022–	Romanian Wolves

== Current squad ==
As of 19 October 2024

Romanian Wolves Rugby Europe Super Cup squad
**Props**: (Romania) **Cosmin Manole**; (Romania) **Alexandru Savin**; (Romania) Emanuel Ilincuță; (Romania) **Ciprian Chiriac**; (Romania) **Vasile Balan**; (Romania) **Iulian Hartig**; (Fiji) Joji Sikote; **Hookers**: (Romania) **Tudor Butnariu**; (Romania) **Ovidiu Cojocaru** (c); **Locks**: (Romania) **Virgil Ghenea**; (Romania) **Ionuț Lucian Mureșan**; (Romania) Robert Murariu; (Romania) **Ștefan Iancu**; (Romania) (Republic of Ireland) **Matthew Tweddle**^{*}	**Back row**: (Romania) **Alexandru Alexe**; (Romania) **Cristi Boboc**; (Romania) **Cristi Chirică**; (Romania) (Turkey) **Kemal Altinok**^{*}; (Romania) **Vlad Neculau**; (Romania) **Kamil Sobota**; (Romania) **Dragoș Ser**; (South Africa) Murray Keanan Antonio; (Romania) **Adrian Mitu**; **Scrum-halves**: (Romania) **Gabriel Rupanu**; (Romania) **Vladuţ Bocăneț**; (Romania) **Alin Conache**; **Fly-halves**: (Romania) **Daniel Plai**; (Romania) Ioan-Ștefan Cojocariu; (Romania) (New Zealand) **Hinckley Vaovasa**^{*}	**Centres**: (South Africa) Dylan Raymond Schwartz; (Romania) David Rafael Florea Jilăveanu; (Romania) **Mihai Graure**; (Romania) (Australia) **Jason Tomane**^{*}; **Wings**: (Romania) **Romeo Corrado-Ștețco**; (Romania) (Tonga) **Fonovai Tangimana**^{*}; (South Africa) Damian Jean Claude Jr. Bonaparte; **Fullbacks**: (Romania) **Edouard Carp**; (Romania) **Paul Popoaia**; (Romania) **Marius Simionescu**
(c) denotes the team captain, **Bold** denotes internationally capped players.^{*} denotes players qualified to play for Romania on residency or dual nationality.

== Current coaching staff ==
The current coaching staff of the Romanian Wolves:

Name	Nationality	Role
Iustin Ilioiu	ROU	Manager
David Gérard	FRA	Head Coach
Simon Maisuradze	GEO	Assistant Coach (Forwards Coach)
Benjamin Lapeyre	FRA	Assistant Coach (Backs Coach)
David Popa	ROU	Video Analyst
Michael Dalley	UK	Strength & Conditioning Head Coach
Adrien Hass	FRA	Strength & Conditioning Assistant Coach
Daniel Carpo	ROU	Strength & Conditioning Assistant Coach
Ilie Vlad	ROU	Team Doctor
Marius Todosi	ROU	Physiotherapist

Last updated: 18 October 2024
Source: Rugby Romania

== Results and statistics ==
=== European Shield ===
Year	Played	Won	Drawn	Loss	For	Against
2004–05	2	1	0	1	39	47

=== European Challenge Cup / European Rugby Challenge Cup ===
Year	Pool	Pos	Played	Won	Drawn	Loss	Bonus	Pts	For	Against
2005–06	3	3rd	6	1	0	5	1	5	71	253
2006–07	1	3rd	6	1	0	5	4	8	124	230
2007–08	2	3rd	6	2	1	3	0	10	77	158
2008–09	3	4th	6	1	0	5	1	5	87	197
2009–10	1	4th	6	1	0	5	3	7	70	136
2010–11	4	3rd	6	1	0	5	1	5	74	148
2011–12	1	3rd	6	2	0	4	2	10	102	184
2012–13	4	3rd	6	2	0	4	1	9	121	215
2013–14	3	3rd	6	2	0	4	2	10	94	105
2014–15	3	4th	6	0	0	6	1	1	77	261

=== European Rugby Continental Shield (Note: Formerly known, in 2014, as European Rugby Challenge Cup Qualifying Competition, this was a rugby union competition organised for entry into the European Rugby Challenge Cup.) ===
Year	Played	Won	Drawn	Loss	For	Against
2014	2	1	0	1	28	26

=== Rugby Europe Super Cup ===
Year	Round	Played	Won	Drawn	Loss	Bonus	Pts	For	Against
2022	Eastern Conference	6	1	0	5	1	5	92	210
2023	Pool B	3	3	0	0	3	15	167	17
2023	Semi-finals	1	0	0	1	-	-	6	31
2023	3rd place final	1	1	0	0	-	-	41	17
2024	Pool B	3	2	0	1	3	11	118	77
2024	Pool B final	1	1	0	0	-	-	46	24

== See also ==
- Category:Romanian Wolves players
- Romania national rugby union team
- Rugby union in Romania
