= Merab Sharikadze =

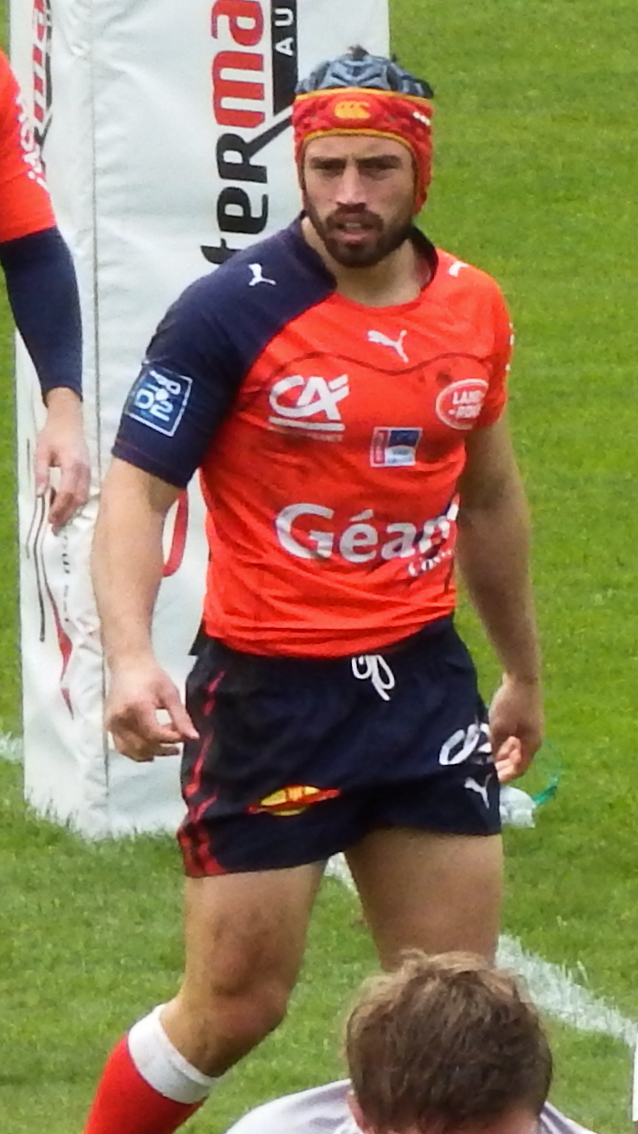
- Sharikadze representing Aurillac during the Pro D2
- Born: 17 May 1993 (age 33) Moscow, Russia
- Height: 1.85 m (6 ft 1 in)
- Weight: 100 kg (220 lb; 15 st 10 lb)
- University: Hartpury College

Rugby union career
- Position: Centre
- Current team: Black Lion
Senior career
| Years | Team | Apps | (Points) |
| 2013–2014 | Bourg-en-Bresse | 15 | (0) |
| 2014–2019 | Aurillac | 77 | (45) |
| 2021– | Black Lion | 17 | (5) |
- Correct as of 4 August 2023
International career
| Years | Team | Apps | (Points) |
| 2012– | Georgia | 104 | (102) |
- Correct as of 1 September 2023

Merab Sharikadze (Georgian: მერაბ შარიქაძე; born 17 May 1993) is a Georgian professional rugby union player who plays as a centre for Super Cup club Black Lion and captains the Georgia national team.

== Early life ==
Merab Sharikadze began rugby in Tbilisi with the club 'Academia'. Aged just 16, he was called up to Georgia U18 team. In 2011, thanks to a partnership between the GRU and Hartpury College, Merab Sharikadze went to England to learn and play for Hartpury College R.F.C.. Thanks to his strong performances, he was called up to play for Gloucester U19. The same year, he was named Georgia U19's captain. He made his full international debut on the 21 February 2012 against Spain, aged only 18, the 7th youngest player to be capped by Georgia.

== Career ==
In September 2013, Merab Sharikadze joined the French side Union Sportive Bressane, just promoted in Pro D2, the French second division. The team finished on the bottom of the table and was relegated. Sharikadze signed to another Pro D2 side, Stade Aurillacois Cantal Auvergne and joined them during the summer 2014. At international level, the inside centre played his first game against a Tier1 nation in November 2014, against Ireland at Aviva Stadium. He showed his defensive skills, making 22 tackles during the game.

During an interview with Setanta Sports Georgia in November 2025, Sharikadze revealed that he had been issued with a six-year ban in December 2024 for an anti-doping rule violation relating to providing his urine for other players for their tests. It was reported that World Rugby and WADA had not publicly commented on the case. Sharikadze added during the interview that was seeking a reduction on the sanction and had changed his sport to mixed martial arts (MMA). In May 2026, Sharikadze's ban was extended to eleven years, covering all sport.
