= Lusitanos (rugby union) =

Portuguese rugby union team

(Portugal) Lusitanos XV
- Founded: 2013; 13 years ago
- Location: Lisbon, Portugal
- Ground: CAR Jamor (Capacity: 500)
- Coach: Simon Mannix
- Captain: Tomás Appleton
- League: Rugby Europe Super Cup
- 2025-26: 2nd

Lusitanos XV are a Portuguese professional rugby union representative team based in Lisbon which was created in September 2013 to compete in the 2013–14 European Challenge Cup. It was announced by the Rugby governing body ERC on 2 September that the Portuguese team would hold their home games at Estádio Nacional. However, all their home games were played at the Portuguese national rugby teams home stadium of Estádio Universitário de Lisboa.

In 2021, the team entered the Rugby Europe Super Cup, representing Portugal in an eight-team pan-European competition for clubs from non-Six Nations countries. The team reached the final, played in May 2022, and lost 17–14 at home against the Black Lions.

== First season ==
The team was formed in 2013, to represent Portugal in the Amlin Challenge Cup after the Spanish representatives Olympus Rugby XV withdrew from the competition. The first game was held on 10 October 2013, against Stade Français, a game which they lost 61–3 at Stade Jean-Bouin.

=== Results ===
Date	Opponents	Venue	Result	Score	Scorers	Attendance	Match Report
10 Oct 2013	(France) Stade Français	Stade Jean-Bouin	L	3 – 61	Pen: Cabral	6,314	report
19 Oct 2013	(England) London Irish	Estádio Universitário de Lisboa	L	6 – 67	Pen: Cabral (2)	1,500	report
7 Dec 2013	(Italy) Cavalieri Prato	Stadio Enrico Chersoni	L	22 – 40	Try: Cunha, Fragoso Mendes (2); Con: Covas, Penha e Costa; Pen: Covas	600	report
12 Dec 2013	(Italy) Cavalieri Prato	Estádio Universitário de Lisboa	L	19 – 30	Try: Fragoso Mendes, Foro, Salgueiro; Con: Penha e Costa (2)	500	report
11 Jan 2014	(England) London Irish	Madejski Stadium	L	3 – 79	Pen: Leal	4,714	report
16 Jan 2014	(France) Stade Français	Estádio Universitário de Lisboa	L	15 – 48	Try: Bettencourt, Miranda; Con: Penha e Costa; Pen: Penha e Costa	350	

=== Pool five table ===
Team	P	W	D	L	PF	PA	Diff	TF	TA	TB	LB	Pts
(France) Stade Français	6	5	0	1	202	75	+127	27	6	4	0	24
(England) London Irish	6	5	0	1	293	65	+228	41	6	4	0	24
(Italy) Cavalieri Prato	6	2	0	4	100	198	−98	12	28	2	1	11
(Portugal) Lusitanos XV	6	0	0	6	68	325	−257	8	47	0	0	0
Source : www.ercrugby.com Points breakdown: *4 points for a win *2 points for a draw *1 bonus point for a loss by seven points or less *1 bonus point for scoring four or more tries in a match

== Second season ==
The team was formed to represent Portugal in the 2021–2022 Rugby Europe Super Cup. The team has only players based in Portugal and the following players are the ones who played, either as starters or subs, in at least one match.

=== Current squad ===
Head Coach: (France) Patrice Lagisquet

- Caps Updated: 11 August 2021

Note: Flags indicate national union for the club/province as defined by World Rugby.

Player	Position	Date of birth (age)	Caps	Club/province
(Portugal) Francisco Cabral	Hooker	17 July 1999 (age 27)	0	Agronomia
(South Africa) Jason Cornelies	Hooker	21 April 2000 (age 26)	0	Benfica
(Portugal) Duarte Diniz	Hooker	8 November 1995 (age 30)	28	Direito
(Portugal) Nuno Mascarenhas	Hooker	18 May 1998 (age 28)	22	Cascais
(Portugal) André Arrojado	Prop	17 February 1992 (age 34)	1	Técnico
(Portugal) Francisco Bruno	Prop	28 May 1995 (age 31)	24	Direito
(Portugal) David Costa	Prop	5 July 1999 (age 27)	13	Direito
(Portugal) João Mateus	Prop	15 July 1990 (age 36)	4	Académica
(Portugal) António Prim	Prop	7 December 2002 (age 23)	0	Direito
(Portugal) Bruno Rocha	Prop	28 September 1992 (age 34)	28	Técnico
(Portugal) António Santos	Prop	9 June 1998 (age 28)	0	Belenenses
(Portugal) Boaventura Almeida	Lock	18 April 2001 (age 25)	0	Cascais
(Portugal) Martim Belo	Lock	27 September 2000 (age 26)	0	Cascais
(Portugal) Manuel Lima	Lock	15 March 1993 (age 33)	0	Belenenses
(Portugal) António Rebelo de Andrade	Lock	12 December 2000 (age 25)	0	Agronomia
(Portugal) Rafael Simões	Lock	20 June 1991 (age 35)	19	CDUL
(Portugal) Duarte Torgal	Lock	23 December 1997 (age 28)	13	Direito
(Portugal) Pedro Afra Rosa	Back row	25 December 1995 (age 30)	2	Direito
(Portugal) Xavier Cerejo	Back row	14 December 2001 (age 24)	0	CDUL
(Portugal) Vasco Baptista	Back row	26 October 1996 (age 29)	3	Benfica
(Portugal) Frederico Couto	Back row	24 April 1993 (age 33)	3	Benfica
(Portugal) João Granate	Back row	21 February 1997 (age 29)	21	Direito
(Portugal) Miguel Macedo	Back row	24 October 1995 (age 31)	10	CDUP
(Portugal) Nuno Peixoto	Back row	2 February 2002 (age 24)	0	Direito
(Portugal) Manuel Picão	Back row	10 April 1997 (age 29)	20	Direito
(Portugal) David Wallis	Back row	17 April 1997 (age 29)	17	Belenenses
(Portugal) João Belo	Scrum-half	2 August 1995 (age 31)	20	CDUP
(Portugal) João Dias	Scrum-half	29 October 1995 (age 30)	1	Direito
(Portugal) Pedro Lucas	Scrum-half	16 October 2000 (age 26)	9	Técnico
(Portugal) Jorge Abecassis	Fly-half	25 May 1997 (age 29)	14	CDUL
(Portugal) Domingos Cabral	Fly-half	16 August 2001 (age 25)	0	Agronomia
(Portugal) Jerónimo Portela	Fly-half	2 November 2000 (age 25)	14	Direito
(Portugal) Tomás Appleton (c)	Centre	29 July 1993 (age 33)	52	CDUL
(Portugal) Vasco Ribeiro	Centre	13 October 1997 (age 29)	13	Agronomia
(Portugal) João Vieira	Centre	30 January 2001 (age 25)	0	CDUL
(Portugal) Francisco Afra Rosa	Wing	9 September 1999 (age 27)	0	Direito
(Portugal) Vasco Durão	Wing	24 November 2001 (age 24)	0	Cascais
(Portugal) Rodrigo Marta	Wing	18 November 1999 (age 26)	21	Belenenses
(Portugal) José Paiva dos Santos	Wing	3 April 2001 (age 25)	0	Belenenses
(Portugal) Diogo Rodrigues	Wing	4 March 2001 (age 25)	0	Belenenses
(Portugal) Francisco Salgado	Wing	14 January 2000 (age 26)	0	Técnico
(Portugal) Manuel Cardoso Pinto	Fullback	7 April 1998 (age 28)	21	Agronomia
(Portugal) João Freudenthal	Fullback	28 December 1995 (age 30)	7	Belenenses
(Portugal) Nuno Sousa Guedes	Fullback	21 November 1994 (age 31)	27	CDUP

== Record ==
These are all of the matches played by the team as of 24 October 2026.

Date	Opponents	Venue	Result	Score
10 Oct 2013	(France) Stade Français	Stade Jean-Bouin	L	3 – 61
19 Oct 2013	(England) London Irish	Estádio Universitário de Lisboa	L	6 – 67
7 Dec 2013	(Italy) Cavalieri Prato	Stadio Enrico Chersoni	L	22 – 40
12 Dec 2013	(Italy) Cavalieri Prato	Estádio Universitário de Lisboa	L	19 – 30
11 Jan 2014	(England) London Irish	Madejski Stadium	L	3 – 79
16 Jan 2014	(France) Stade Français	Estádio Universitário de Lisboa	L	15 – 48
18 Sep 2021	(Spain) Castilla y León Iberians	CAR Jamor	W	34 – 19
26 Sep 2021	(Spain) Castilla y León Iberians	Estadio Pepe Rojo	W	20 – 13
23 Oct 2021	(Netherlands) Delta	RC Eemland Stadium	W	50 – 7
30 Oct 2021	(Belgium) Brussels Devils	Sportcentrum Nelson Mandela	W	38 – 13
4 Dec 2021	(Belgium) Brussels Devils	CAR Jamor	W	53 – 14
11 Dec 2021	(Netherlands) Delta	CAR Jamor	W	62 – 7
16 Apr 2022	(Israel) Tel Aviv Heat	CAR Jamor	W	42 – 26
7 May 2022	(Georgia (country)) Black Lion	CAR Jamor	L	14 – 17
11 Sep 2022	(Netherlands) Delta	Amersfoort	W	26 – 19
17 Sep 2022	(Belgium) Brussels Devils	CAR Jamor	W	95 – 0
24 Sep 2022	(Spain) Castilla y León Iberians	Estadio Pepe Rojo	W	22 – 20
15 Oct 2022	(Spain) Castilla y León Iberians	CAR Jamor	L	12 – 17
22 Oct 2022	(Belgium) Brussels Devils	Sportcentrum Nelson Mandela	W	95 – 0
28 Oct 2022	(Netherlands) Delta	CAR Jamor	W	47 – 10
4 Dec 2022	(Israel) Tel Aviv Heat	CAR Jamor	L	22 – 30
4 Nov 2023	(Israel) Tel Aviv Heat	CAR Jamor	L	23 – 31
11 Nov 2023	(Georgia (country)) Black Lion	CAR Jamor	L	0 – 22
19 Nov 2023	(Spain) Castilla y León Iberians	Estadio Pepe Rojo	L	13 – 18
3 Dec 2023	(Netherlands) Delta	Amersfoort	W	53 – 8
16 Dec 2023	(Belgium) Brussels Devils	NRCA Stadium	W	46 – 29
7 Sep 2024	(Spain) Castilla y León Iberians	CAR Jamor	W	36 – 18
21 Sep 2024	(Georgia (country)) Black Lion	CAR Jamor	L	17 – 38
12 Oct 2024	(Georgia (country)) Black Lion	Mikheil Meskhi Stadium	L	0 – 36
20 Oct 2024	(Spain) Castilla y León Iberians	San Amaro Stadium	W	21 – 12
11 Oct 2025	(Czech Republic) Bohemia Rugby Warriors	CAR Jamor	W	42 – 21
18 Oct 2025	(Belgium) Brussels Devils	Sportcomplex Sint-Gillisr	W	41 – 17
25 Oct 2025	(Netherlands) Delta	CAR Jamor	W	36 – 10
6 Dec 2025	(Romania) Romanian Wolves	Arcul de Triumf Stadium	W	35 – 7
13 Dec 2025	(Spain) Castilla y León Iberians	CAR Jamor	L	13 – 26
18 Oct 2025	(Belgium) Brussels Devils	CAR Jamor	W	63 – 14
13 Dec 2025	(Spain) Castilla y León Iberians	NRCA Stadium	L	17 – 42
5 Jun 2026	(South Africa) Cheetahs	Toyota Stadium	L	24 – 54
10 Jun 2026	(South Africa) Pumas	Toyota Stadium	L	24 – 57
14 Jun 2026	(South Africa) Griquas	Toyota Stadium	L	7 – 76
24 Sep 2026	(South Africa) Cheetahs	Avchala Stadium	L	26 – 38
30 Sep 2026	(South Africa) Griquas	Avchala Stadium	L	19 – 59
4 Oct 2026	(South Africa) Pumas	Avchala Stadium	L	20 – 68
17 Oct 2026	(Czech Republic) Bohemia Rugby Warriors	Rugby Aréna Tatra Smíchov	W	74 – 12
24 Oct 2026	(Romania) Romanian Wolves	Estádio Dr. José Luís de Melo Silveira Botelho	W	77 – 5

Opponent	Played	Won	Lost	Drawn	% Won
(Belgium) Brussels Devils	7	7	0	0	100%
(Czech Republic) Bohemia Rugby Warriors	2	2	0	0	100%
(England) London Irish	2	0	2	0	0%
(France) Stade Français	2	0	2	0	0%
(Georgia (country)) Black Lion	4	0	4	0	0%
(Israel) Tel Aviv Heat	3	1	2	0	33.33%
(Italy) Cavalieri Prato	2	0	2	0	0%
(Netherlands) Delta	6	6	0	0	100%
(Romania) Romanian Wolves	2	2	0	0	100%
(South Africa) Cheetahs	2	0	2	0	0%
(South Africa) Griquas	2	0	2	0	0%
(South Africa) Pumas	2	0	2	0	0%
(Spain) Castilla y León Iberians	9	5	4	0	55.56%
Total	45	23	22	0	51.11%

== See also ==
- Rugby union in Portugal
- Portugal national rugby union team
