= Rugby Europe Super Cup =

Rugby union club competition

- Current season or competition: 2026 Rugby Europe Super Cup
- Sport: Rugby Union
- Instituted: 2021; 5 years ago
- Number of teams: 5
- Country: Belgium; Czech Republic; Netherlands; Portugal; Romania
- Holders: (Spain) Castilla y León Iberians (1st title) (2025–26)
- Most titles: (Georgia (country)) Black Lion (4)
- Website: rugbyeurope.eu/super-cup

The Rugby Europe Super Cup is an annual men's rugby union club tournament organised by the continental governing body, Rugby Europe. Featuring clubs outside the traditional Six Nations strongholds of the sport, it effectively forms a third tier of European club rugby beneath the EPCR-organised European Rugby Champions Cup and European Rugby Challenge Cup. The first Super Cup competition took place in 2021–22.

== Format ==
The tournament was announced as an annual event for emerging nations in Europe. Professional rugby clubs and franchise teams can take part in it. Teams are divided into two conferences: western and eastern. Each team plays every conference rival home and away. The two best teams from each conference advance to the semi-finals, where they play for a ticket to the final. In 2023 for the first time the Czech Rugby Union was involved in the European club competition with Bohemia Rugby Warriors taking part.

=== Teams ===
| Teams | Joined |
|---|---|
| (Czech Republic) Bohemia Rugby Warriors | 2023 |
| (Belgium) Brussels Devils | 2021–22 |
| (Netherlands) Delta | 2021–22 |
| (Portugal) Lusitanos XV | 2021–22 |
| (Romania) Romanian Wolves | 2022 |

=== Former Teams ===
The first competition included two Russian teams who were expelled following the invasion of Ukraine, to be replaced with teams from Romania and Georgia in the second season.

In April 2025 Black Lion revealed that they were in talks to join the United Rugby Championship and they decided to withdraw from the Rugby Europe Super Cup.

After 2025–26 season Castilla y León Iberians decided to withdraw from the Rugby Europe Super Cup.

| Teams | Seasons |
|---|---|
| (Georgia (country)) Batumi RC | 2022 |
| (Georgia (country)) Black Lion | 2021–22, 2022, 2023, 2024 |
| (Spain) Castilla y León Iberians | 2021–22, 2022, 2023, 2024, 2025–26 |
| (Russia) Lokomotiv Penza | 2021–22 |
| (Israel) Tel Aviv Heat | 2021–22, 2022, 2023 |
| (Russia) Yenisey-STM | 2021–22 |

The goal of the tournament is to bridge the development gap between European countries and attract new sponsors in new markets. All 27 matches are filmed and widely broadcast on TV and digital platforms.

The plan was to expand the Super Cup to include 12 teams by 2023 and 16 teams by 2025.

== Finals ==
=== 2021–23 ===
| Year | Final | | | | Third place match | | | |
| Year | Host | Winner | Score | Runner-up | Host | 3rd place | Score | 4th place |
| 2021–22 | Lisbon | (Georgia (country)) Black Lion | 17–14 | (Portugal) Lusitanos XV | —N/a | | | |
| 2022 | Tbilisi | (Georgia (country)) Black Lion | 29–17 | (Israel) Tel Aviv Heat | —N/a | | | |
| 2023 | Tbilisi | (Georgia (country)) Black Lion | 27–17 | (Israel) Tel Aviv Heat | Amsterdam | (Romania) Romanian Wolves | 41–17 | (Spain) Castilla y León Iberians |

=== 2024 ===
| Year | Pool A | | | Pool B |
| Year | Winner | Runner-up | 3rd place | Winner |
| 2024 | (Georgia (country)) Black Lion | (Portugal) Lusitanos XV | (Spain) Castilla y León Iberians | (Romania) Romanian Wolves |

=== 2025–2026 ===
| Year | Final | | | | Third place match | | | |
| Year | Host | Winner | Score | Runner-up | Host | 3rd place | Score | 4th place |
| 2025–26 | Amsterdam | (Spain) Castilla y León Iberians | 42–17 | (Portugal) Lusitanos XV | Amsterdam | (Netherlands) Delta | 36–31 | (Belgium) Brussels Devils |

=== 2026–present ===
| Year | Winner | Runner-up | 3rd place | 4th place |
| 2026 | | | | |

== Performances by team ==
| Team | Winners | Runner-up | 3rd place | 4th place | 5th place | 6th place | 7th place | 8th place |
|---|---|---|---|---|---|---|---|---|
| (Georgia (country)) Black Lion | 4 (2021–22, 2022, 2023, 2024) | —N/a | —N/a | —N/a | —N/a | —N/a | —N/a | —N/a |
| (Spain) Castilla y León Iberians | 1 (2025–26) | —N/a | 3 (2021–22, 2022, 2024) | 1 (2023) | —N/a | —N/a | —N/a | —N/a |
| (Portugal) Lusitanos XV | —N/a | 3 (2021–22, 2024, 2025–26) | 1 (2022) | —N/a | 1 (2023) | —N/a | —N/a | —N/a |
| (Israel) Tel Aviv Heat | —N/a | 2 (2022, 2023) | 1 (2021–22) | —N/a | —N/a | —N/a | —N/a | —N/a |
| (Romania) Romanian Wolves | —N/a | —N/a | 1 (2023) | 1 (2024) | —N/a | 1 (2025–26) | —N/a | —N/a |
| (Netherlands) The Delta | —N/a | —N/a | 1 (2025–26) | 1 (2021–22) | 1 (2024) | —N/a | 2 (2022, 2023) | —N/a |
| (Belgium) Brussels Devils | —N/a | —N/a | —N/a | 1 (2025–26) | 2 (2021–22, 2022) | 2 (2023, 2024) | —N/a | —N/a |
| (Czech Republic) Bohemia Rugby Warriors | —N/a | —N/a | —N/a | —N/a | 1 (2025–26) | 1 (2023, 2024) | 1 (2024) | 1 (2023) |
| (Georgia (country)) Batumi RC | —N/a | —N/a | —N/a | —N/a | 1 (2022) | —N/a | —N/a | —N/a |
| (Russia) Lokomotiv Penza^{[a]} | —N/a | —N/a | —N/a | —N/a | —N/a | —N/a | —N/a | —N/a |
| (Russia) Yenisey-STM^{[a]} | —N/a | —N/a | —N/a | —N/a | —N/a | —N/a | —N/a | —N/a |
^{a} Disqualified due to Russian invasion of Ukraine

=== Number of participating clubs by country ===
The following is a list of clubs that have played or will be playing in the Rugby Europe Super Cup group stage.

| Nation | No. | Clubs | Years |
|---|---|---|---|
| (Georgia (country)) Georgia (2) | 4 | Black Lion | 2021–22, 2022, 2023, 2024 |
| (Georgia (country)) Georgia (2) | 1 | RC Batumi | 2022 |
| Russia (2) | 1 | Lokomotiv Penza | 2021–22 |
| Russia (2) | 1 | Yenisey-STM | 2021–22 |
| Belgium (1) | 6 | Brussels Devils | 2021–22, 2022, 2023, 2024, 2025–26, 2026 |
| Netherlands (1) | 6 | Delta | 2021–22, 2022, 2023, 2024, 2025–26, 2026 |
| Portugal (1) | 6 | Lusitanos | 2021–22, 2022, 2023, 2024, 2025–26, 2026 |
| Spain (1) | 5 | Castilla y León Iberians | 2021–22, 2022, 2023, 2024, 2025–26 |
| Israel (1) | 3 | Tel Aviv Heat | 2021–22, 2022, 2023 |
| Romania (1) | 5 | Romanian Wolves | 2022, 2023, 2024, 2025–26, 2026 |
| Czech Republic (1) | 4 | Bohemia Rugby Warriors | 2023, 2024, 2025–26, 2026 |
