= Time in Georgia (country) =

Time zone used in the country of Georgia

Time in Europe: Light Blue / Western European Time / Greenwich Mean Time (UTC); Blue / Western European Time / Greenwich Mean Time (UTC); Blue / Western European Summer Time / British Summer Time / Irish Standard Time (UTC+1); Red / Central European Time (UTC+1); Red / Central European Summer Time (UTC+2); Yellow / Eastern European Time / Kaliningrad Time (UTC+2); Ochre / Eastern European Time (UTC+2); Ochre / Eastern European Summer Time (UTC+3); Green / Moscow Time / Turkey Time (UTC+3); Turquoise / Armenia Time / Azerbaijan Time / Georgia Time / Samara Time (UTC+4); ▉▉▉▉ Pale hues: Standard time observed all year ▉▉▉ Dark hues: Daylight saving time

Georgia uses a timezone UTC+04:00 referred to in the country as Tbilisi Time (Georgian: თბილისის დრო, romanized: Tbilisis Dro; GET). Georgia has not observed daylight saving time since 2005. In the Russian-occupied territories in Georgia (breakaway states of Republic of Abkhazia and South Ossetia), the de facto timezone is Moscow Time (UTC+3).

== History ==
During the Soviet times, Georgian SSR had the decree time of 3rd timezone, which was further than Moscow Time by one hour (UTC+4). In the railway and airway systems, Moscow Time was used. In 1981, the Soviet Union introduced a switch to daylight saving time.

In the independent Georgia, the daylight saving time dates have matched the dates agreed upon by European countries (March and October). On 27 June 2004, President of Georgia Mikheil Saakashvili made a decree switching Georgia to UTC+03:00 timezone. The reasons cited for the switch were "geographical location of the country, processes of Eurointegration, and recommendation by the Time and Frequency Services of the Department of Standardisation, Metrology, and Certification of Georgia." On 27 March 2005, Georgia had switched to summer time for the last time (to UTC+4:00).

On 13 October 2005, President Saakashvili made another decree, which was approved by the Government of Georgia, to abolish the daylight saving time. According to Natela Turnava, then-Deputy Minister of Economy of Georgia, the move was intended to reduce electricity consumption and better align with circadian rhythms of the population of Georgia.

== In the occupied territories ==
After Republic of Abkhazia and South Ossetia proclaimed independence, the territories they controlled started using Moscow Time instead of Tbilisi Time. However, unlike Russia, where daylight saving time was used each year, Republic of Abkhazia only started to observe it in 2005.

In 2011, after Russia abolished daylight saving time, Republic of Abkhazia and South Ossetia also stopped the practice and their shared timezone switched to UTC+4:00. After Russia switched Moscow Time to UTC+3:00 timezone, timezone in the territories of breakaway states followed suit again.

In 2024, a group of South Ossetia residents made a plea to the president of the breakaway republic to switch their timezone to UTC+4:00 because of its better alignment with geographical location of the region.
