= NRCA Stadium =

National Dutch rugby stadium in Amsterdam

Coordinates: 52°22′43″N 4°47′10″E

NRCA Stadion
- Interactive map of NRCA Stadion
- Address: Amsterdam; Netherlands
- Location: Bok de Korverweg 6, 1067 HR; Amsterdam, Netherlands
- Capacity: 5,000

Construction
- Built: 1997

Tenant
- Netherlands national rugby union team (1997–present)

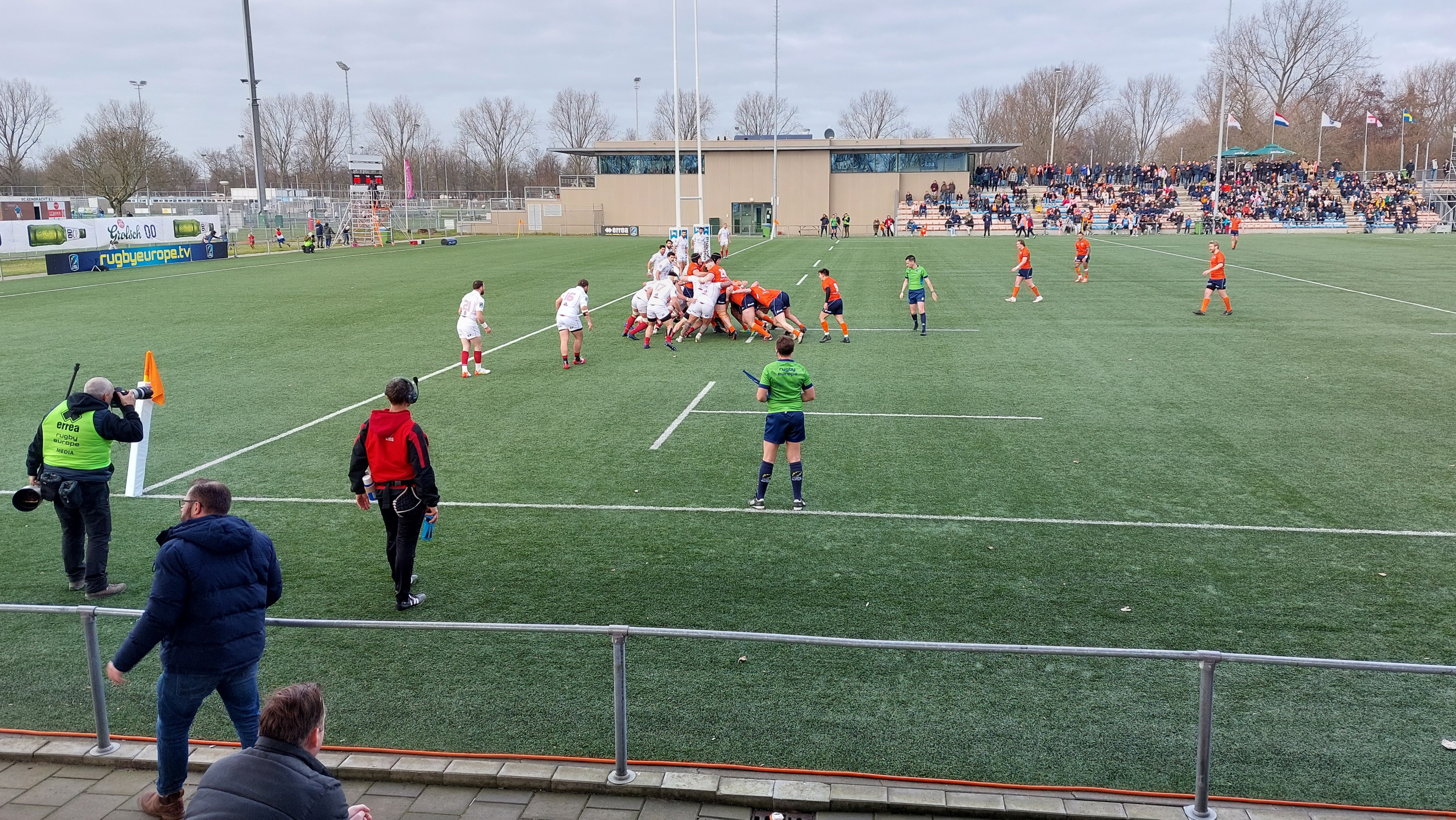
A rugby match between the Netherlands and Georgia at the Nationaal Rugby Centrum Amsterdam

The National Rugby Centre Amsterdam, also known as NRCA Stadium, is a rugby stadium in Amsterdam. The complex is situated within the Sportpark de Eendracht in the district of Geuzenveld-Slotermeer. All international matches of the Netherlands national team are played at the NCRA, and the offices of the Netherlands Rugby Board (NRB) are at the complex.

Plans for the National Rugby Centre Amsterdam (NRCA) were formed by the NRB in the eighties and nineties as the increasing interest in rugby grew so strong that the old offices in Bussum became impracticable. Candidates for a new national rugby center had included The Hague, Amersfoort and Amsterdam. After much deliberation and some lobbying, the location at Sportpark De Eendracht was finally selected. The complex was completed in 1997 and officially opened by the then Secretary of State for Sport Erica Terpstra.

Besides the Dutch national team, the rugby clubs ASRV Ascrum and AAC play at the complex. The final of the top division of the Dutch national rugby championship is played at the stadium, as is the Amsterdam Sevens, a long-term and internationally renowned rugby sevens tournament. The Amsterdam Women's Sevens which is part of the World Rugby Women's Sevens Series is also played at the NRCA.
