= Black Lion (rugby union) =

Georgian rugby union team, based in Tbilisi

- Nickname: Lomi (The Lions)
- Founded: 2021; 5 years ago
- Location: Tbilisi, Georgia
- Coach: Marco Bortolami (interim)
- Captain: Mikheil Babunashvili
- Most appearances: Luka Ivanishvili (36 appearances)
- Top scorer: Luka Matkava (247 points)
- Most tries: Akaki Tabutsadze (20 tries)
- League(s): Rugby Europe Super Cup 2021-2024; Currie Cup First Division 2022; EPCR Challenge Cup
- 2021–22 SC 2022 SC 2022 CC: Champions; Champions; 1st Eastern Conference; Semi-finalist; 4th (league phase)
1st kit	2nd kit

Official website
- facebook.com/BlackLionRugby

The Black Lion (Georgian: შავი ლომი Shavi Lomi) is a professional Georgian rugby union team based in Tbilisi that competes annually in the European Challenge Cup, the second tier of European Rugby Cup.

They also competed in the Currie Cup First Division in South Africa in 2022. Black Lion competed in Rugby Europe Super Cup from 2021 to 2024.

== History ==
The franchise was created in 2021 to participate in the Rugby Europe Super Cup. It is owned by the Georgian Federation, which employs the players. All the players are without clubs or playing in the Georgia league (Didi 10). Players are made available to Didi 10 clubs when they have no obligations with their franchise, up to a limit of 4 per club. The club played the Currie Cup First Division in 2022. In Spring 2023, Black Lion toured South America, playing against the professional sides featuring in Super Rugby Americas. They defeated the club sides they faced, but were narrowly defeated 28–24 by a South America XV squad in Montevideo.

In June 2023, Black Lion applied to take part in the European Challenge Cup, the second tier of European club Rugby. They participated in the Challenge Cup for the 2023-24 season as one of two invited teams. Black Lion were the first Georgian rugby team to ever play in the Challenge Cup tournament. On 15 December 2023 Black Lion won their first match in the competition, defeating Welsh hosts Scarlets.

== Name ==
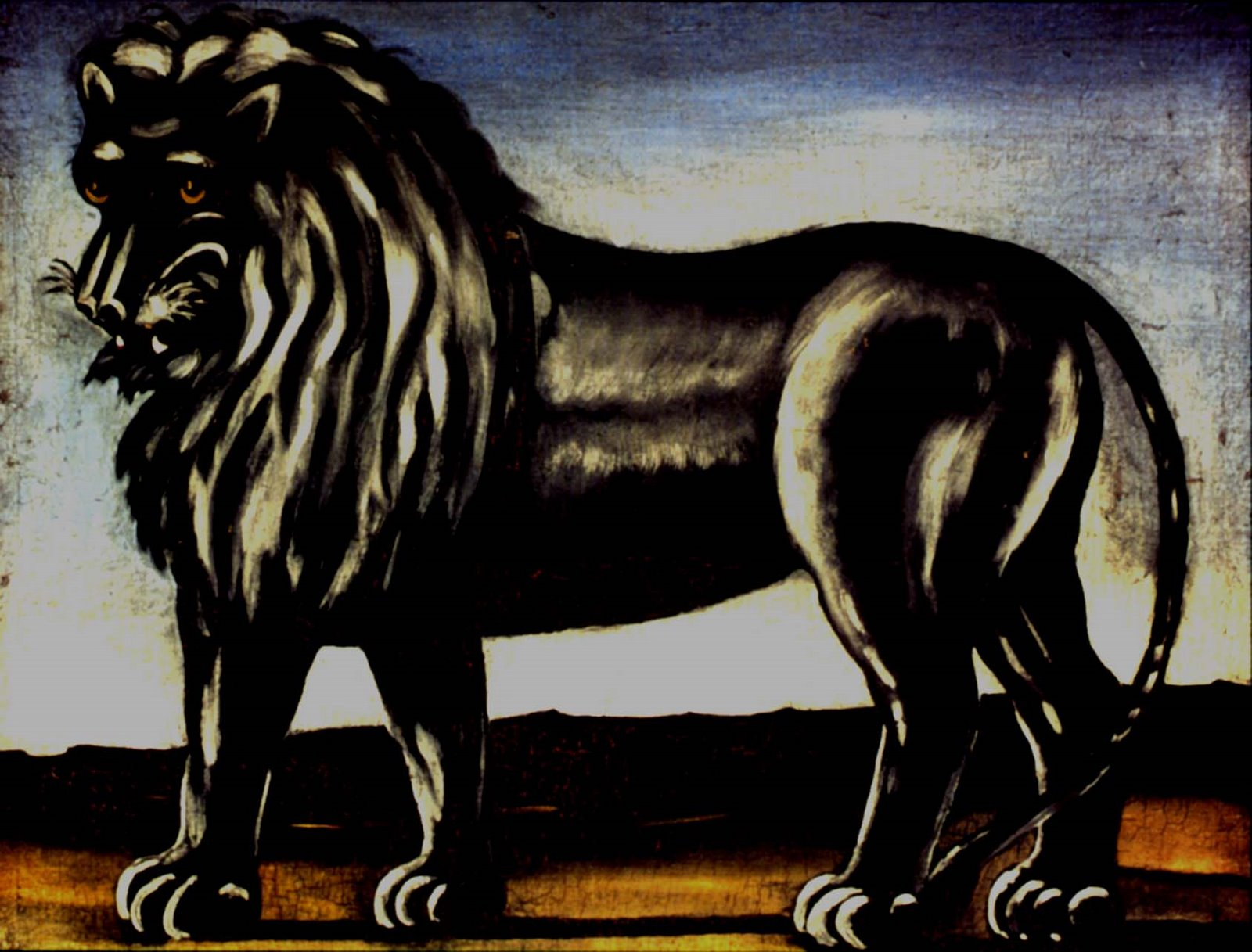
Niko Pirosmani's The Black Lion (1905)

The name of the franchise has several inspirations. The players of the national team are sometimes nicknamed the lions, in reference to an (unofficial) anthem of the national team, which says: "freedom is the property of the lions". Also this is similar to the Georgian Rugby Union's slogan, "Freedom is a lion's destiny". The second inspiration comes from Georgian artist Niko Pirosmani, one of whose most famous works is the painting Black Lion. The club logo is a reinterpretation of the lion's face in a style reminiscent of a fusion of the Georgian letters შ (shini) and ლ (lasi), the initials of the club's name, in the unique typeface of the Georgian alphabet.

== Honours ==
- Rugby Europe Super Cup
  - Winners (4): 2021-22, 2022, 2023, 2024
- 2022 Currie Cup First Division semi-finalists
- Toyota Challenge
  - Winners (1): 2025
    - Runners up (1): 2025

== Wins against pro teams ==
Date	Home	Score	Away	Venue	Status
15 December 2023	Scarlets (Wales)	7–23	(Georgia (country)) Black Lion	Parc y Scarlets, Llanelli	2023–24 EPCR Challenge Cup
7 December 2024	Black Lion (Georgia (country))	22–19	(France) Vannes	Mikheil Meskhi Stadium, Tbilisi	2024–25 EPCR Challenge Cup
10 January 2026	Montauban (France)	28–31	(Georgia (country)) Black Lion	Stade Sapiac, Montauban	2025–26 EPCR Challenge Cup

== Current squad ==
The Black Lion squad for EPCR Challenge Cup 2026–27 season is:

Black Lion Squad
**Props**: (Georgia (country)) Dato Abdushelishvili; (Georgia (country)) Bachuki Baratashvili; (Georgia (country)) Giorgi Chkhartishvili; (Georgia (country)) Nika Khatiashvili; (Georgia (country)) Giorgi Kimutsadze; (Georgia (country)) Giga Kobakhidze; (Georgia (country)) Giorgi Mamaiashvili; (Georgia (country)) Nikoloz Narmania; **Hookers**: (Georgia (country)) Vakhtang Jincharadze; (Georgia (country)) Shota Kheladze; (Georgia (country)) Irakli Kvatadze; **Locks**: (Georgia (country)) Davit Arveladze; (Georgia (country)) Mikheil Babunashvili; (Georgia (country)) Lado Chachanidze; (New Zealand) Michael Curry; (Georgia (country)) Demuri Epremidze; (Samoa) Potu Leavasa	**Flankers**: (Georgia (country)) Otar Giorgadze; (Georgia (country)) Sandro Mamamtavrishvili; (Georgia (country)) Luka Narsia; (Georgia (country)) Giorgi Sinauridze; (Georgia (country)) Lasha Tsikhistavi; (Georgia (country)) Giorgi Tsutskiridze; **Scrum-halves**: (Georgia (country)) Temur Dzodzuashvili; (Georgia (country)) Mikheil Kachlavashvili; (Georgia (country)) Davit Khuroshvili; (Georgia (country)) Giorgi Spenderashvili; **Fly-halves**: (Georgia (country)) Giorgi Babunashvili; (Georgia (country)) Davit Imnadze; (Georgia (country)) Mate Makharadze	**Centres**: (Georgia (country)) Data Akhvlediani; (Georgia (country)) Demetre Devdariani; (Georgia (country)) Tornike Kakhoidze; (Georgia (country)) Leonide Saldadze; (Georgia (country)) Luka Tabatadze; (Georgia (country)) Demi Tapladze; **Wings**: (Georgia (country)) Romani Makhatadze; (Georgia (country)) Otar Metreveli; (Georgia (country)) Akaki Tabutsadze; **Fullbacks**: (Georgia (country)) Vazha Mikadze; (Georgia (country)) Luka Takaishvili; (Georgia (country)) Luka Tsirekidze
(c) Denotes team captain, **Bold** denotes internationally capped.

== Coaches ==
=== Current coaching staff ===
The current coaching staff for the Black Lion team:

Name	Nationality	Role
Vasil Abashidze	GEO	Manager
Lekso Iordanishvili	GEO	Manager
Pierre-Henry Broncan	FRA	Head coach
Davit Nemsadze	GEO	Strength & Conditioning coach
William Lavis	ENG	Rehab coach
Absalom Abramishvili	GEO	Physiotherapist
Ed Barry	ENG	Physiotherapist
Davit Ramishvili	GEO	Video-Analyst
Nika Pinaishvili	GEO	GPS-Analyst

== See also ==
- Georgia national rugby union team
- Rugby union in Georgia
- Tbilisi Caucasians
- Category:Black Lion (rugby union) players
