= 2015 Rugby World Cup Pool C =

Sport competition

Pool C of the 2015 Rugby World Cup began on 19 September and was completed on 11 October 2015. The pool was composed of New Zealand (the title holders), Argentina and Tonga – who all qualified automatically for the tournament due to finishing in the top three positions in their pools in 2011 – along with the top European qualifier, Georgia, and the top African qualifier, Namibia.

After winning the first three of their matches, New Zealand became the first team to qualify for the 2015 Rugby World Cup quarter-finals. After Tonga loss to New Zealand in their last Pool Match, Argentina became the second team from Pool C to qualify for the quarter-finals. New Zealand eventually went on to win Rugby World Cup 2015, beating Australia 34 - 17 in the final.

== Standings ==
Pos	Team	Pld	W	D	L	PF	PA	PD	T	B	Pts	Qualification
1	New Zealand	4	4	0	0	174	49	+125	25	3	19	Advanced to the quarter-finals and qualified for the 2019 Rugby World Cup
2	Argentina	4	3	0	1	179	70	+109	22	3	15	Advanced to the quarter-finals and qualified for the 2019 Rugby World Cup
3	Georgia	4	2	0	2	53	123	−70	5	0	8	Eliminated but qualified for 2019 Rugby World Cup
4	Tonga	4	1	0	3	70	130	−60	8	2	6	
5	Namibia	4	0	0	4	70	174	−104	8	1	1	

== Matches ==
All times are local United Kingdom time (UTC+01)

=== Tonga vs Georgia ===
19 September 2015
12:00

Tonga	10–17	Georgia
Try: Vainikolo 72' c Con: Morath (1/1) 73'; Pen: Morath (1/1) 9'	Report	Try: Gorgodze 27' c Tkhilaishvili 56' c Con: Kvirikashvili (2/2) 28', 57'; Pen: Kvirikashvili (1/3) 19'

Kingsholm, Gloucester
Attendance: 14,200
Referee: Nigel Owens (Wales)

Tonga	Georgia

FB	15	Vunga Lilo
RW	14	Telusa Veainu
OC	13	William Helu	(substituted off) 51'
IC	12	Siale Piutau
LW	11	Fetuʻu Vainikolo
FH	10	Kurt Morath
SH	9	Sonatane Takulua
N8	8	Viliami Maʻafu
OF	7	Nili Latu (c)	(substituted off) 71'
BF	6	Sione Kalamafoni
RL	5	Steve Mafi	(substituted off) 59'
LL	4	Tukulua Lokotui
TP	3	Halani Aulika	(substituted off) 64'
HK	2	Elvis Taione	(substituted off) 51'
LP	1	Tevita Mailau	(substituted off) 51'
Replacements:
HK	16	Paul Ngauamo	(substituted on) 51'
PR	17	Sona Taumalolo	(substituted on) 51'
PR	18	Sila Puafisi	(substituted on) 64'
FL	19	Hale T-Pole	(substituted on) 59'
FL	20	Jack Ram	(substituted on) 71'
SH	21	Samisoni Fisilau
FH	22	Latiume Fosita
CE	23	Sione Piukala	(substituted on) 51'
Coach:
(Tonga) Mana Otai

FB	15	Merab Kvirikashvili	(yellow card) 72'
RW	14	Tamaz Mchedlidze
OC	13	Davit Kacharava
IC	12	Merab Sharikadze
LW	11	Giorgi Aptsiauri
FH	10	Lasha Malaghuradze
SH	9	Vasil Lobzhanidze		(substituted off) 78'
N8	8	Mamuka Gorgodze (c)
OF	7	Viktor Kolelishvili
BF	6	Giorgi Tkhilaishvili		(substituted off) 65'
RL	5	Konstantin Mikautadze		(substituted off) 63'
LL	4	Giorgi Nemsadze
TP	3	Davit Zirakashvili		(substituted off) 60'
HK	2	Jaba Bregvadze		(substituted off) 60'
LP	1	Mikheil Nariashvili		(substituted off) 60'
Replacements:
HK	16	Shalva Mamukashvili		(substituted on) 60'
PR	17	Karlen Asieshvili		(substituted on) 60'
PR	18	Levan Chilachava		(substituted on) 60'
LK	19	Levan Datunashvili		(substituted on) 63'
FL	20	Shalva Sutiashvili		(substituted on) 65'
SH	21	Giorgi Begadze		(substituted on) 78'
WG	22	Giorgi Pruidze
WG	23	Muraz Giorgadze
Coach:
(New Zealand) Milton Haig

Man of the Match:
Mamuka Gorgodze (Georgia)

Touch judges:
Chris Pollock (New Zealand)
Leighton Hodges (Wales)
Television match official:
George Ayoub (Australia)

Notes:

- Fetuʻu Vainikolo surpassed Josh Taumalolo's record of 14 tries for his country, to become Tonga's record try scorer.
- Merab Kvirikashvili surpassed Irakli Abuseridze's record of 85 caps for his country, to become Georgia's most capped player.
- Vasil Lobzhanidze, at 18 years and 340 days, became the youngest ever player to appear in a World Cup match.
- Shalva Sutiashvili earned his 50th test cap for Georgia.

=== New Zealand vs Argentina ===
20 September 2015
16:45

New Zealand	26–16	Argentina
Try: A. Smith 57' c Cane 67' c Con: Carter (2/2) 58', 67'; Pen: Carter (4/4) 5', 11', 19', 40'	Report	Try: Petti 21' c Con: Sánchez (1/1) 23'; Pen: Sánchez (3/3) 30', 38', 43'

Wembley Stadium, London
Attendance: 89,019
Referee: Wayne Barnes (England)

New Zealand	Argentina

FB	15	Ben Smith
RW	14	Nehe Milner-Skudder		(substituted off) 50'
OC	13	Conrad Smith	(yellow card) 37'
IC	12	Ma'a Nonu		(substituted off) 46'
LW	11	Julian Savea
FH	10	Dan Carter
SH	9	Aaron Smith		(substituted off) 69'
N8	8	Kieran Read
OF	7	Richie McCaw (c)	(yellow card) 30'
BF	6	Jerome Kaino		(substituted off) 65'
RL	5	Sam Whitelock
LL	4	Brodie Retallick		(substituted off) 71'
TP	3	Owen Franks		(substituted off) 50'
HK	2	Dane Coles		(substituted off) 68'
LP	1	Tony Woodcock		(substituted off) 46'
Replacements:
HK	16	Keven Mealamu		(substituted on) 68'
PR	17	Wyatt Crockett		(substituted on) 46'
PR	18	Charlie Faumuina		(substituted on) 50'
N8	19	Victor Vito		(substituted on) 71'
FL	20	Sam Cane		(substituted on) 65'
SH	21	TJ Perenara		(substituted on) 69'
FH	22	Beauden Barrett		(substituted on) 50'
CE	23	Sonny Bill Williams		(substituted on) 46'
Coach:
(New Zealand) Steve Hansen

FB	15	Joaquín Tuculet		(substituted off) 70'
RW	14	Santiago Cordero
OC	13	Marcelo Bosch
IC	12	Juan Martín Hernández
LW	11	Juan Imhoff
FH	10	Nicolás Sánchez		(substituted off) 69'
SH	9	Tomás Cubelli		(substituted off) 62'
N8	8	Leonardo Senatore		(substituted off) 65'
OF	7	Juan Martín Fernández Lobbe
BF	6	Pablo Matera	(yellow card) 10'	(substituted off) 58'
RL	5	Tomás Lavanini
LL	4	Guido Petti		(substituted off) 23'
TP	3	Nahuel Tetaz Chaparro		(substituted off) 54'
HK	2	Agustín Creevy (c)		(substituted off) 70'
LP	1	Marcos Ayerza
Replacements:
HK	16	Julián Montoya		(substituted on) 65'
PR	17	Lucas Noguera Paz		(substituted on) 70'
PR	18	Ramiro Herrera		(substituted on) 54'
LK	19	Mariano Galarza		(substituted on) 23'
FL	20	Juan Manuel Leguizamón		(substituted on) 58'
SH	21	Martín Landajo		(substituted on) 62'
CE	22	Jerónimo de la Fuente		(substituted on) 69'
FB	23	Lucas González Amorosino		(substituted on) 70'
Coach:
(Argentina) Daniel Hourcade

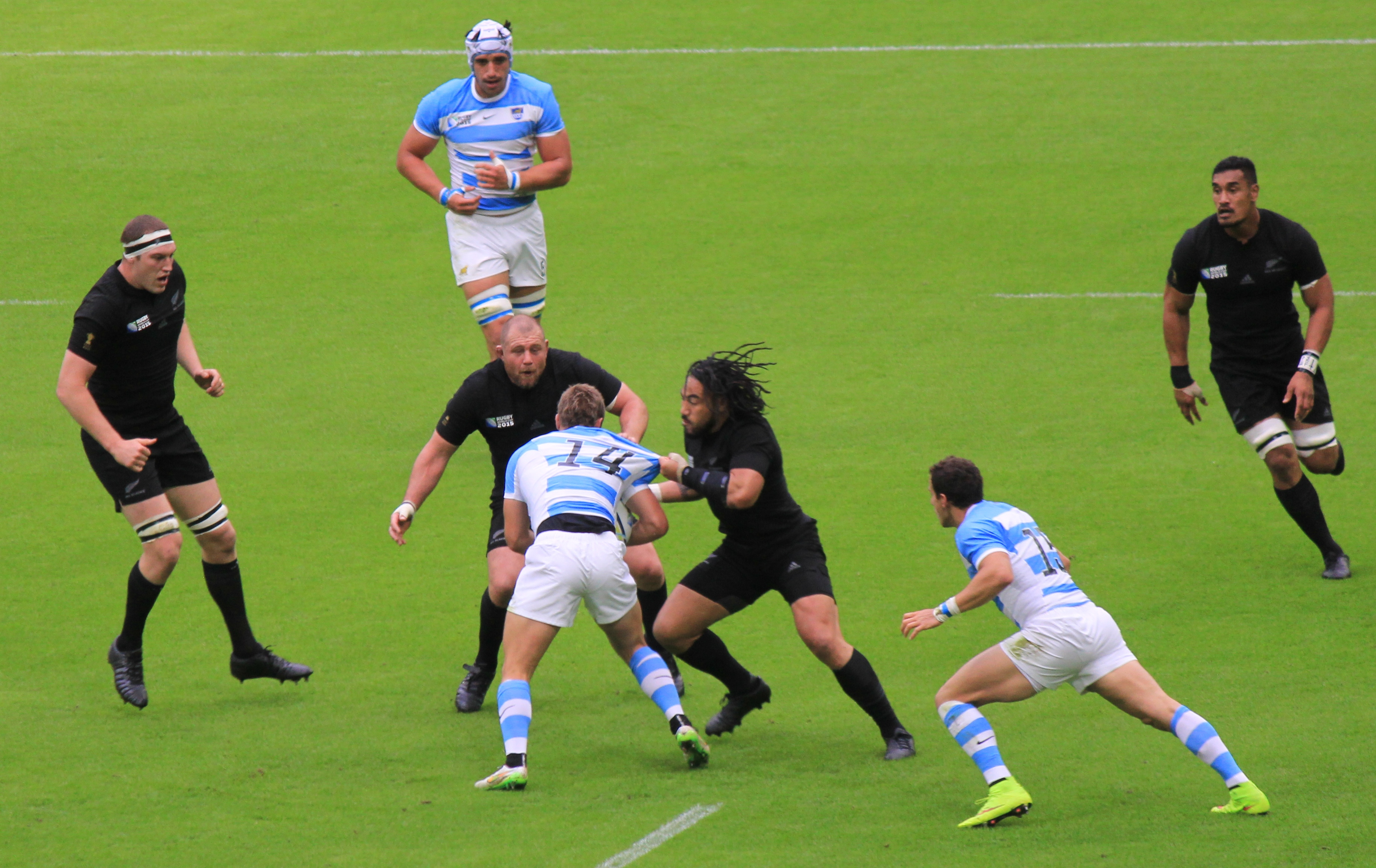

Man of the Match:
Brodie Retallick (New Zealand)

Touch judges:
JP Doyle (England)
Angus Gardner (Australia)
Television match official:
George Ayoub (Australia)

Notes:

- The 89,019 crowd, surpassed the tournament's biggest crowd for a match, set in the 2003 Rugby World Cup Final, of 82,957.
- New Zealand fielded the most experienced ever starting fifteen in international history.
- This marks the first time, New Zealand failed to win with a bonus point in the pool stages of the Rugby World Cup, ever since they were introduced.

=== New Zealand vs Namibia ===
24 September 2015
20:00

New Zealand	58–14	Namibia
Try: Vito 6' c Milner-Skudder (2) 10' m, 40' m Fekitoa 21' c Barrett 31' c Savea (2) 47' c, 75' m Smith 61' m Taylor 79' c Con: Barrett (4/8) 7', 21', 32', 80'; Slade (1/1) 48'; Pen: Barrett (1/1) 5'	Report	Try: Deysel 51' m Pen: Kotzé (3/3) 14', 23', 44'

Olympic Stadium, London
Attendance: 51,820
Referee: Romain Poite (France)

New Zealand	Namibia

FB	15	Colin Slade	(substituted off) 52'
RW	14	Nehe Milner-Skudder
OC	13	Malakai Fekitoa
IC	12	Sonny Bill Williams	(substituted off) 62'
LW	11	Julian Savea
FH	10	Beauden Barrett
SH	9	TJ Perenara	(substituted off) 48'
N8	8	Victor Vito
OF	7	Sam Cane (c)
BF	6	Jerome Kaino	(substituted off) 62'
RL	5	Sam Whitelock	(substituted off) 52'
LL	4	Luke Romano
TP	3	Charlie Faumuina	(substituted off) 64'
HK	2	Codie Taylor
LP	1	Ben Franks
Replacements:
HK	16	Keven Mealamu
PR	17	Wyatt Crockett	(substituted on) 64'
PR	18	Tony Woodcock
N8	19	Kieran Read	(substituted on) 52'
FL	20	Richie McCaw	(substituted on) 62'
SH	21	Tawera Kerr-Barlow	(substituted on) 48'
CE	22	Ma'a Nonu	(substituted on) 62'
FB	23	Ben Smith	(substituted on) 52'
Coach:
(New Zealand) Steve Hansen

FB	15	Johann Tromp
RW	14	David Philander		(substituted off) 58'	(substituted on) 69'
OC	13	JC Greyling
IC	12	Johan Deysel
LW	11	Conrad Marais		(substituted off) 45'
FH	10	Theuns Kotzé
SH	9	Eugene Jantjies		(substituted off) 73'
N8	8	Leneve Damens		(substituted off) 45'	(substituted on) 50'	(substituted off) 53'
OF	7	Tinus du Plessis			50' to 53'
BF	6	Jacques Burger (c)		(substituted off) 65'
RL	5	Tjiuee Uanivi
LL	4	PJ van Lill		(substituted off) 63'
TP	3	Aranos Coetzee		(substituted off) 48'	(substituted on) 60'	(substituted off) 69'	(substituted on) 73'
HK	2	Torsten van Jaarsveld		(substituted off) 73'
LP	1	Jaco Engels	(yellow card) 57'		(substituted off) 69'
Replacements:
HK	16	Louis van der Westhuizen		(substituted on) 73'
PR	17	Casper Viviers		(substituted on) 58'
PR	18	Raoul Larson		(substituted on) 48'	(substituted off) 60'	(substituted on) 69'	(substituted off) 73'
FL	19	Renaldo Bothma		(substituted on) 45'
LK	20	Janco Venter		(substituted on) 65'
FL	21	Rohan Kitshoff		(substituted on) 63'
SH	22	Eniell Buitendag		(substituted on) 73'
FB	23	Chrysander Botha		(substituted on) 45'
Coach:
(Wales) Phil Davies

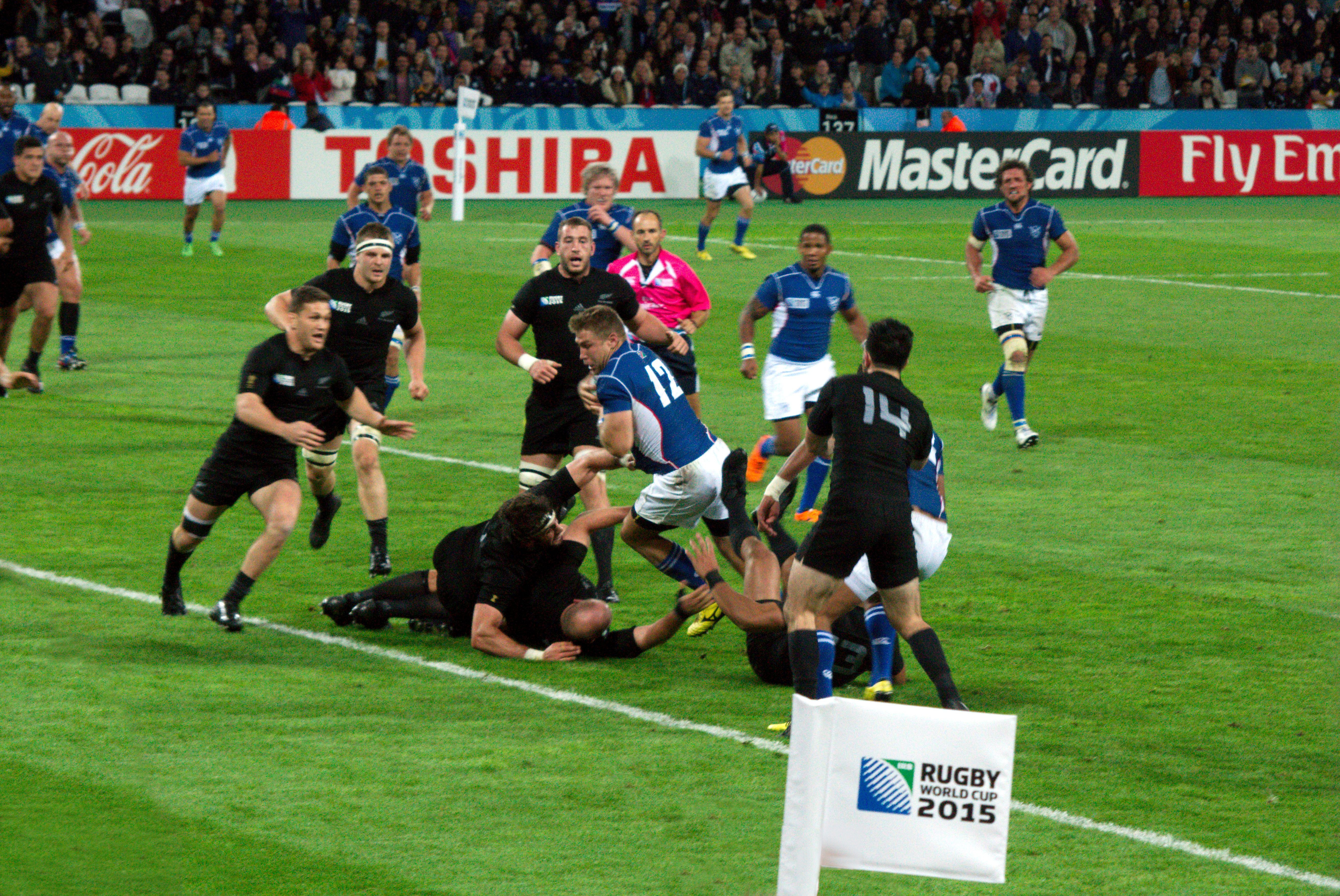

Man of the Match:
Nehe Milner-Skudder (New Zealand)

Touch judges:
Craig Joubert (South Africa)
Mathieu Raynal (France)
Television match official:
George Ayoub (Australia)

Notes:

- This was the first ever match between these nations.
- Richie McCaw became the most capped New Zealander player at a Rugby World Cup, surpassing Sean Fitzpatrick's record of 17.

=== Argentina vs Georgia ===
25 September 2015
16:45

Argentina	54–9	Georgia
Try: Lavanini 10' m Cubelli 47' c Imhoff (2) 49' c, 76' m Cordero (2) 53' c, 72' c Landajo 70' c Con: Sánchez (3/4) 48', 51', 54'; Bosch (2/3) 71', 74'; Pen: Sánchez (2/2) 21', 35'; Drop: Sánchez 6'	Report	Pen: Kvirikashvili (3/3) 17', 20', 32'

Kingsholm, Gloucester
Attendance: 14,256
Referee: JP Doyle (England)

Argentina	Georgia

FB	15	Joaquín Tuculet
RW	14	Santiago Cordero
OC	13	Marcelo Bosch
IC	12	Juan Martín Hernández	(substituted off) 37'
LW	11	Juan Imhoff
FH	10	Nicolás Sánchez	(substituted off) 65'
SH	9	Tomás Cubelli	(substituted off) 58'
N8	8	Facundo Isa
OF	7	Juan Martín Fernández Lobbe	(substituted off) 65'
BF	6	Juan Manuel Leguizamón	(substituted off) 58'
RL	5	Tomás Lavanini
LL	4	Matías Alemanno
TP	3	Nahuel Tetaz Chaparro	(substituted off) 58'
HK	2	Agustín Creevy (c)	(substituted off) 63'
LP	1	Marcos Ayerza	(substituted off) 68'
Replacements:
HK	16	Julián Montoya	(substituted on) 63'
PR	17	Lucas Noguera Paz	(substituted on) 68'
PR	18	Ramiro Herrera	(substituted on) 58'
FL	19	Javier Ortega Desio	(substituted on) 65'
FL	20	Pablo Matera	(substituted on) 58'
SH	21	Martín Landajo	(substituted on) 58'
CE	22	Jerónimo de la Fuente	(substituted on) 37'
FB	23	Lucas González Amorosino	(substituted on) 65'
Coach:
(Argentina) Daniel Hourcade

FB	15	Merab Kvirikashvili		(substituted off) 54'
RW	14	Tamaz Mchedlidze		(substituted off) 59'
OC	13	Davit Kacharava
IC	12	Merab Sharikadze
LW	11	Giorgi Aptsiauri
FH	10	Lasha Malaghuradze
SH	9	Vasil Lobzhanidze		(substituted off) 58'
N8	8	Mamuka Gorgodze (c)	(yellow card) 45'
OF	7	Viktor Kolelishvili		(substituted off) 58'
BF	6	Giorgi Tkhilaishvili
RL	5	Konstantin Mikautadze		(substituted off) 49'
LL	4	Giorgi Nemsadze
TP	3	Davit Zirakashvili		(substituted off) 52'
HK	2	Jaba Bregvadze		(substituted off) 49'
LP	1	Mikheil Nariashvili		(substituted off) 52'
Replacements:
HK	16	Shalva Mamukashvili		(substituted on) 49'
PR	17	Kakha Asieshvili		(substituted on) 52'
PR	18	Levan Chilachava		(substituted on) 52'
LK	19	Levan Datunashvili		(substituted on) 49'
FL	20	Shalva Sutiashvili		(substituted on) 58'
SH	21	Giorgi Begadze		(substituted on) 58'
WG	22	Giorgi Pruidze		(substituted on) 59'
WG	23	Muraz Giorgadze		(substituted on) 54'
Coach:
(New Zealand) Milton Haig

Man of the Match:
Santiago Cordero (Argentina)

Touch judges:
Nigel Owens (Wales)
Stuart Berry (South Africa)
Television match official:
Ben Skeen (New Zealand)

=== Tonga vs Namibia ===
29 September 2015
16:45

Tonga	35–21	Namibia
Try: Veainu (2) 6' c, 55' m Ram (2) 12' m, 45' m Fosita 25' c Con: Lilo (2/5) 7', 26'; Pen: Lilo (1/2) 35'; Morath (1/1) 73'	Report	Try: Tromp 18' c Burger (2) 49' c, 67' c Con: Kotzé (3/3) 19', 49', 68'

Sandy Park, Exeter
Attendance: 10,103
Referee: Glen Jackson (New Zealand)

Tonga	Namibia

FB	15	Vunga Lilo	(substituted off) 60'
RW	14	David Halaifonua
OC	13	Siale Piutau (c)	(substituted off) 58'
IC	12	Sione Piukala
LW	11	Telusa Veainu
FH	10	Latiume Fosita
SH	9	Sonatane Takulua	(substituted off) 58'
N8	8	Viliami Maʻafu (c)
OF	7	Jack Ram
BF	6	Sione Kalamafoni	(substituted off) 33'
RL	5	Joe Tuineau
LL	4	Hale T-Pole	(substituted off) 43'
TP	3	Sila Puafisi	(substituted off) 60'
HK	2	Aleki Lutui	(substituted off) 47'
LP	1	Soane Tongaʻuiha	(substituted off) 60'
Replacements:
HK	16	Paul Ngauamo	(substituted on) 47'
PR	17	Tevita Mailau	(substituted on) 60'
PR	18	Halani Aulika	(substituted on) 60'
LK	19	Tukulua Lokotui	(substituted on) 43'
N8	20	Opeti Fonua	(substituted on) 33'
SH	21	Samisoni Fisilau	(substituted on) 58'
FH	22	Kurt Morath	(substituted on) 58'
WG	23	William Helu	(substituted on) 60'
Coach:
(Tonga) Mana Otai

FB	15	Chrysander Botha
RW	14	Johann Tromp	(substituted off) 65'
OC	13	Danie van Wyk
IC	12	Johan Deysel	(substituted off) 72'
LW	11	Russell van Wyk
FH	10	Theuns Kotzé
SH	9	Eniell Buitendag	(substituted off) 71'
N8	8	Renaldo Bothma	(substituted off) 68'
OF	7	Rohan Kitshoff
BF	6	Jacques Burger (c)
RL	5	Tjiuee Uanivi
LL	4	Janco Venter	(substituted off) 40'
TP	3	Aranos Coetzee	(substituted off) 72'
HK	2	Torsten van Jaarsveld	(substituted off) 74'
LP	1	Casper Viviers	(substituted off) 40'
Replacements:
HK	16	Louis van der Westhuizen	(substituted on) 74'
PR	17	Johnny Redelinghuys	(substituted on) 40'
PR	18	AJ de Klerk	(substituted on) 72'
FL	19	Tinus du Plessis	(substituted on) 68'
N8	20	PJ van Lill	(substituted on) 40'
CE	21	Darryl de la Harpe	(substituted on) 72'
SH	22	Damian Stevens	(substituted on) 71'
WG	23	David Philander	(substituted on) 65'
Coach:
(Wales) Phil Davies

Man of the Match:
Jack Ram (Tonga)

Touch judges:
Chris Pollock (New Zealand)
Federico Anselmi (Argentina)
Television match official:
Ben Skeen (New Zealand)

Notes:

- Tonga became the first team to name two captains in a Rugby World Cup match.
- The 3 tries scored by Namibia were the most scored by the team in a World Cup match.
- The 35 points scored by Tonga is the highest ever score it has posted in a Rugby World Cup game.
- Kurt Morath surpassed Pierre Hola's record of 317 points for his country to become Tonga's highest-ever point scorer.

=== New Zealand vs Georgia ===
2 October 2015
20:00

New Zealand	43–10	Georgia
Try: Naholo 2' c Savea (3) 8' m, 17' m, 74' c Coles 22' m Read 52' c Fekitoa 77' c Con: Carter (4/7) 3', 53', 75', 78'	Report	Try: Tsiklauri 5' c Con: Malaghuradze (1/1) 6'; Pen: Malaghuradze (1/1) 12'

Millennium Stadium, Cardiff
Attendance: 69,187
Referee: Pascal Gaüzère (France)

New Zealand	Georgia

FB	15	Ben Smith
RW	14	Waisake Naholo	(substituted off) 53'
OC	13	Conrad Smith		(substituted off) 63'
IC	12	Sonny Bill Williams	(substituted off) 56'	(substituted on) 63'
LW	11	Julian Savea
FH	10	Dan Carter
SH	9	Aaron Smith	(substituted off) 71'
N8	8	Kieran Read
OF	7	Richie McCaw (c)	(substituted off) 61'
BF	6	Jerome Kaino
RL	5	Sam Whitelock
LL	4	Brodie Retallick
TP	3	Charlie Faumuina	(substituted off) 61'
HK	2	Dane Coles	(substituted off) 71'
LP	1	Wyatt Crockett	(substituted off) 61'
Replacements:
HK	16	Keven Mealamu	(substituted on) 71'
PR	17	Tony Woodcock	(substituted on) 61'
PR	18	Owen Franks	(substituted on) 61'
N8	19	Victor Vito	(substituted on) 56'
FL	20	Sam Cane	(substituted on) 61'
SH	21	Tawera Kerr-Barlow	(substituted on) 71'
SH	22	TJ Perenara
CE	23	Malakai Fekitoa	(substituted on) 53'
Coach:
(New Zealand) Steve Hansen

FB	15	Beka Tsiklauri
RW	14	Giorgi Aptsiauri
OC	13	Davit Kacharava
IC	12	Tamaz Mchedlidze	(substituted off) 76'
LW	11	Alexander Todua	(substituted off) 66'
FH	10	Lasha Malaghuradze
SH	9	Giorgi Begadze	(substituted off) 45'
N8	8	Lasha Lomidze	(substituted off) 68'
OF	7	Mamuka Gorgodze (c)	(substituted off) 48'
BF	6	Shalva Sutiashvili
RL	5	Giorgi Chkhaidze
LL	4	Levan Datunashvili
TP	3	Levan Chilachava	(substituted off) 51'
HK	2	Shalva Mamukashvili	(substituted off) 66'
LP	1	Kakha Asieshvili	(substituted off) 51'
Replacements:
HK	16	Simon Maisuradze	(substituted on) 66'
PR	17	Mikheil Nariashvili	(substituted on) 51'
PR	18	Anton Peikrishvili	(substituted on) 51'
LK	19	Konstantin Mikautadze	(substituted on) 48'
FL	20	Viktor Kolelishvili	(substituted on) 68'
SH	21	Vasil Lobzhanidze	(substituted on) 45'
CE	22	Merab Sharikadze	(substituted on) 66'
WG	23	Muraz Giorgadze	(substituted on) 76'
Coach:
(New Zealand) Milton Haig

Man of the Match:
Mamuka Gorgodze (Georgia)

Touch judges:
Angus Gardner (Australia)
Mathieu Raynal (France)
Television match official:
Shaun Veldsman (South Africa)

Notes:

- This was the first ever match between these nations.

=== Argentina vs Tonga ===
4 October 2015
14:30

Argentina	45–16	Tonga
Try: Tuculet 20' c Imhoff 22' c Sánchez 64' m Montoya 72' c Cordero 80' c Con: Sánchez (4/5) 21', 23', 73', 80'; Pen: Sánchez (4/5) 18', 26', 44', 53'	Report	Try: Morath 7' m Tongaʻuiha 38' m Pen: Morath (2/4) 33', 42'

Leicester City Stadium, Leicester
Attendance: 29,124
Referee: Jaco Peyper (South Africa)

Argentina	Tonga

FB	15	Joaquín Tuculet
RW	14	Santiago Cordero
OC	13	Matías Moroni	(substituted off) 71'
IC	12	Jerónimo de la Fuente
LW	11	Juan Imhoff	(substituted off) 58'
FH	10	Nicolás Sánchez
SH	9	Martín Landajo	(substituted off) 65'
N8	8	Leonardo Senatore	(substituted off) 51'
OF	7	Juan Martín Fernández Lobbe
BF	6	Pablo Matera
RL	5	Tomás Lavanini
LL	4	Guido Petti	(substituted off) 65'
TP	3	Ramiro Herrera	(substituted off) 65'
HK	2	Agustín Creevy (c)	(substituted off) 65'
LP	1	Marcos Ayerza	(substituted off) 65'
Replacements:
HK	16	Julián Montoya	(substituted on) 65'
PR	17	Lucas Noguera Paz	(substituted on) 65'
PR	18	Juan Pablo Orlandi	(substituted on) 65'
LK	19	Matías Alemanno	(substituted on) 65'
N8	20	Facundo Isa	(substituted on) 51'
SH	21	Tomás Cubelli	(substituted on) 65'
FH	22	Santiago González Iglesias	(substituted on) 71'
WG	23	Horacio Agulla	(substituted on) 58'
Coach:
(Argentina) Daniel Hourcade

FB	15	Vunga Lilo	(substituted off) 71'
RW	14	Telusa Veainu
OC	13	Siale Piutau
IC	12	Sione Piukala	(substituted off) 50'
LW	11	Fetuʻu Vainikolo
FH	10	Kurt Morath
SH	9	Sonatane Takulua	(substituted off) 71'
N8	8	Viliami Maʻafu	(substituted off) 61'
OF	7	Nili Latu (c)
BF	6	Sione Kalamafoni
RL	5	Joe Tuineau	(substituted off) 67'
LL	4	Tukulua Lokotui
TP	3	Halani Aulika	(substituted off) 71'
HK	2	Elvis Taione	(substituted off) 61'
LP	1	Soane Tongaʻuiha	(substituted off) 61'
Replacements:
HK	16	Aleki Lutui	(substituted on) 61'
PR	17	Sona Taumalolo	(substituted on) 61'
PR	18	Sila Puafisi	(substituted on) 71'
LK	19	Steve Mafi	(substituted on) 67'
N8	20	Opeti Fonua	(substituted on) 61'
SH	21	Samisoni Fisilau	(substituted on) 71'
FH	22	Latiume Fosita	(substituted on) 50'
WG	23	David Halaifonua	(substituted on) 71'
Coach:
(Tonga) Mana Otai

Man of the Match:
Nicolás Sánchez (Argentina)

Touch judges:
Glen Jackson (New Zealand)
Mike Fraser (New Zealand)
Television match official:
Ben Skeen (New Zealand)

Notes

- This was the first ever match between these nations.

=== Namibia vs Georgia ===
7 October 2015
20:00

Namibia	16–17	Georgia
Try: Kotzé 74' c Con: Kotzé (1/1) 76'; Pen: Kotzé (3/3) 2', 18', 71'	Report	Try: Gorgodze 50' c Malaghuradze 55' c Con: Kvirikashvili (2/2) 51', 56'; Pen: Kvirikashvili (1/1) 68'

Sandy Park, Exeter
Attendance: 11,156
Referee: George Clancy (Ireland)

Namibia	Georgia

FB	15	Chrysander Botha
RW	14	David Philander		(substituted off) 40+5'	(substituted on) 51'
OC	13	Danie van Wyk		(substituted off) 28'
IC	12	Darryl de la Harpe		(substituted off) 76'
LW	11	Russell van Wyk
FH	10	Theuns Kotzé
SH	9	Eugene Jantjies		(substituted off) 68'
N8	8	Renaldo Bothma	(yellow card) 50'
OF	7	Tinus du Plessis		60' to 68'
BF	6	Jacques Burger (c)		(substituted off) 10'
RL	5	Tjiuee Uanivi
LL	4	PJ van Lill			(substituted off) 68'
TP	3	Raoul Larson	(yellow card) 40+5'			(substituted off) 60'
HK	2	Torsten van Jaarsveld		(substituted off) 71'
LP	1	Johnny Redelinghuys		(substituted off) 60'
Replacements:
HK	16	Louis van der Westhuizen		(substituted on) 71'
PR	17	Jaco Engels		(substituted on) 60'
PR	18	Aranos Coetzee	(yellow card) 40+10'	(substituted on) 40+5'	(substituted off) 51'	(substituted on) 60'
FL	19	Wian Conradie		(substituted on) 60'
FL	20	Rohan Kitshoff		(substituted on) 10'
FB	21	Johann Tromp		(substituted on) 76'
SH	22	Damian Stevens		(substituted on) 68'
WG	23	Heinrich Smit		(substituted on) 28'
Coach:
(Wales) Phil Davies

FB	15	Merab Kvirikashvili		(substituted off) 76'
RW	14	Tamaz Mchedlidze		(substituted off) 43'
OC	13	Davit Kacharava
IC	12	Merab Sharikadze
LW	11	Alexander Todua
FH	10	Lasha Malaghuradze
SH	9	Vasil Lobzhanidze		(substituted off) 66'
N8	8	Mamuka Gorgodze (c)
OF	7	Viktor Kolelishvili		(substituted off) 40+5'	(substituted on) 40+6'	(substituted off) 40'
BF	6	Giorgi Tkhilaishvili
RL	5	Konstantin Mikautadze		(substituted off) 57'
LL	4	Giorgi Nemsadze
TP	3	Davit Zirakashvili
HK	2	Jaba Bregvadze	(yellow card) 35'			(substituted off) 57'
LP	1	Mikheil Nariashvili		(substituted off) 36'
Replacements:
HK	16	Shalva Mamukashvili		(substituted on) 40+5'	(substituted off) 40+6'	(substituted on) 57'
PR	17	Kakha Asieshvili		(substituted on) 36'
PR	18	Anton Peikrishvili
LK	19	Levan Datunashvili		(substituted on) 57'
N8	20	Lasha Lomidze				(substituted on) 40'
SH	21	Giorgi Begadze		(substituted on) 66'
WG	22	Giorgi Aptsiauri		(substituted on) 43'
FB	23	Beka Tsiklauri		(substituted on) 76'
Coach:
(New Zealand) Milton Haig

Man of the Match:
Tinus du Plessis (Namibia)

Touch judges:
Romain Poite (France)
Stuart Berry (South Africa)
Television match official:
Shaun Veldsman (South Africa)

Notes:

- Alexander Todua earned his 50th test cap for Georgia.
- Theuns Kotzé surpassed Jaco Coetzee's record of 335 points to become Namibia top point scorer.
- The losing bonus point for Namibia was the country's first-ever competition point in a Rugby World Cup.

=== New Zealand vs Tonga ===
9 October 2015
20:00

New Zealand	47–9	Tonga
Try: B. Smith 13' c Woodcock 31' c Milner-Skudder (2) 52' c, 58' c Williams 66' c Cane 70' c Nonu 76' m Con: Carter (6/7) 15', 32', 54', 59', 66', 72'	Report	Pen: Morath (3/3) 26', 49', 57'

St. James' Park, Newcastle
Attendance: 50,985
Referee: John Lacey (Ireland)

New Zealand	Tonga

FB	15	Ben Smith
RW	14	Nehe Milner-Skudder
OC	13	Conrad Smith		(substituted off) 62'
IC	12	Ma'a Nonu
LW	11	Waisake Naholo		(substituted off) 57'
FH	10	Dan Carter
SH	9	Aaron Smith		(substituted off) 72'
N8	8	Kieran Read (c)	(yellow card) 38'
OF	7	Sam Cane
BF	6	Jerome Kaino
RL	5	Sam Whitelock		(substituted off) 66'
LL	4	Luke Romano		(substituted off) 49'
TP	3	Owen Franks		(substituted off) 62'
HK	2	Dane Coles		(substituted off) 66'
LP	1	Tony Woodcock		(substituted off) 43'
Replacements:
HK	16	Keven Mealamu		(substituted on) 66'
PR	17	Wyatt Crockett		(substituted on) 43'
PR	18	Ben Franks		(substituted on) 62'
LK	19	Brodie Retallick		(substituted on) 49'
FL	20	Liam Messam		(substituted on) 66'
SH	21	Tawera Kerr-Barlow		(substituted on) 72'
FH	22	Beauden Barrett		(substituted on) 57'
CE	23	Sonny Bill Williams		(substituted on) 62'
Coach:
(New Zealand) Steve Hansen

FB	15	Vunga Lilo
RW	14	Telusa Veainu		(substituted off) 66'
OC	13	Siale Piutau
IC	12	Latiume Fosita
LW	11	Fetuʻu Vainikolo
FH	10	Kurt Morath		(substituted off) 62'
SH	9	Sonatane Takulua		(substituted off) 70'
N8	8	Viliami Maʻafu		(substituted off) 66'
OF	7	Nili Latu (c)
BF	6	Sione Kalamafoni
RL	5	Joe Tuineau		(substituted off) 54'
LL	4	Tukulua Lokotui
TP	3	Halani Aulika		(substituted off) 70'
HK	2	Elvis Taione		(substituted off) 49'
LP	1	Soane Tongaʻuiha		(substituted off) 55'
Replacements:
HK	16	Paul Ngauamo	(yellow card) 70'	(substituted on) 49'
PR	17	Sona Taumalolo		(substituted on) 55'
PR	18	Sila Puafisi		(substituted on) 70'
LK	19	Steve Mafi		(substituted on) 54'
FL	20	Jack Ram		(substituted on) 66'
SH	21	Samisoni Fisilau		(substituted on) 70'
CE	22	Viliami Tahituʻa		(substituted on) 62'
WG	23	William Helu		(substituted on) 66'
Coach:
(Tonga) Mana Otai

Man of the Match:
Nehe Milner-Skudder (New Zealand)

Touch judges:
JP Doyle (England)
Marius Mitrea (Italy)
Television match official:
Graham Hughes (England)

Notes:

- Ma'a Nonu became the sixth All Blacks player to earn his 100th test cap.

=== Argentina vs Namibia ===
11 October 2015
12:00

Argentina	64–19	Namibia
Try: Hernández 7' c Moroni 19' c Agulla 24' c Isa 36' m Noguera Paz 40' c Alemanno 49' c Senatore 64' c Montoya 69' c Cubelli 74' c Con: González Iglesias (4/5) 8', 20', 26', 40'; Socino (4/4) 50', 65', 70', 75'; Pen: González Iglesias (1/2) 12'	Report	Try: Tromp 13' c Greyling 46' c Jantjies 80' m Con: Kotzé (2/2) 14', 47'

Leicester City Stadium, Leicester
Attendance: 30,198
Referee: Pascal Gaüzère (France)

Argentina	Namibia

FB	15	Lucas González Amorosino
RW	14	Matías Moroni
OC	13	Santiago González Iglesias		(substituted off) 65'
IC	12	Juan Pablo Socino
LW	11	Horacio Agulla
FH	10	Juan Martín Hernández		(substituted off) 51'
SH	9	Martín Landajo (c)		(substituted off) 53'
N8	8	Facundo Isa
OF	7	Javier Ortega Desio
BF	6	Pablo Matera		(substituted off) 50'
RL	5	Matías Alemanno		(substituted off) 61'
LL	4	Guido Petti
TP	3	Juan Pablo Orlandi		(substituted off) 53'
HK	2	Julián Montoya		(substituted off) 70'
LP	1	Lucas Noguera Paz
Replacements:
HK	16	Agustín Creevy		(substituted on) 70'
PR	17	Marcos Ayerza
PR	18	Ramiro Herrera		(substituted on) 53'
N8	19	Leonardo Senatore		(substituted on) 50'
FL	20	Juan Martín Fernández Lobbe		(substituted on) 61'
SH	21	Tomás Cubelli		(substituted on) 53'
CE	22	Marcelo Bosch	(yellow card) 53'	(substituted on) 51'
WG	23	Juan Imhoff		(substituted on) 65'
Coach:
(Argentina) Daniel Hourcade

FB	15	Chrysander Botha		(substituted off) 58'
RW	14	Johann Tromp
OC	13	JC Greyling	(yellow card) 11'	(substituted off) 65'
IC	12	Johan Deysel
LW	11	Conrad Marais
FH	10	Theuns Kotzé
SH	9	Damian Stevens		(substituted off) 65'
N8	8	Leneve Damens		(substituted off) 58'
OF	7	Wian Conradie
BF	6	Rohan Kitshoff (c)
RL	5	Tjiuee Uanivi
LL	4	Janco Venter		(substituted off) 6'
TP	3	Aranos Coetzee		(substituted off) 47'
HK	2	Torsten van Jaarsveld		(substituted off) 52'
LP	1	Jaco Engels		(substituted off) 52'
Replacements:
HK	16	Louis van der Westhuizen		(substituted on) 52'
PR	17	Johnny Redelinghuys		(substituted on) 52'
PR	18	AJ de Klerk		(substituted on) 47'
N8	19	PJ van Lill		(substituted on) 6'
FL	20	Tinus du Plessis	(yellow card) 76'	(substituted on) 58'
WG	21	Russell van Wyk		(substituted on) 58'
SH	22	Eugene Jantjies		(substituted on) 65'
WG	23	Heinrich Smit		(substituted on) 65'
Coach:
(Wales) Phil Davies

Man of the Match:
Horacio Agulla (Argentina)

Touch judges:
Jérôme Garcès (France)
Mike Fraser (New Zealand)
Television match official:
George Ayoub (Australia)

Notes:

- Martín Landajo earned his 50th test cap for Argentina.
- Johnny Redelinghuys became the first Namibian player to earn his 50th test cap.
