= Milton Haig =

- Born: 6 February 1964 (age 62) Invercargill, New Zealand
- School: Southland Boys' High School

Rugby union career
- Position: Scrum-half
- Current team: Georgia
Amateur team(s)
Years	Team	Apps	(Points)
1985–87	Johannesburg Pirates		
1991–93	Greerton Marist RFC		
1993–94	Preston Lodge RFC		
1995–99	Mount Maunganui RFC		
Senior career
Years	Team	Apps	(Points)
1985	London Scottish		
1985–86	Orrell R.U.F.C.		
1987–88	Richmond		
Provincial / State sides
Years	Team	Apps	(Points)
1983–88	Southland	9	(0)
1989–96	Bay of Plenty	52	(19)
- Correct as of 2 April 2015
International career
Years	Team	Apps	(Points)
1992	NZ Marist		(0)
1992	NZ presidents XV		(0)
Coaching career
- Years: Team
- 1991–93: Greerton Marist RFC
- 1993–94: Preston Lodge RFC
- 1995–99: Mount Maunganui RFC
- 2000–02: Bay of Plenty (Asst. Coach)
- 2002–07: Wanganui
- 2006, 2007: New Zealand U21 (Asst. Coach)
- 2008: Māori All Blacks (Asst. Coach)
- 2008–11: Counties Manukau
- 2011: Chiefs (Asst. Coach)
- 2011–2019: Georgia
- 2020-21: Suntory Sungoliath
- 2025-: New Zealand U20
- Correct as of 2 April 2015

Milton Haig (born 6 February 1964) is a New Zealand rugby union coach and former player. He was the head coach of the Georgian national team that annually competes the European Nations Cup.

== Playing career ==
Haig, a former half back in his playing career, started playing rugby for his school Southland Boys' High School in 1980, where he was selected for the first XV between 1980 and 1982. He was selected for the New Zealand under 17s side in 1980, but did not take part in any game while in the team. In May 1982, his form for his school saw him be selected for Southland, while still being educated at school. He earned a position in the squad for the encounter against the Japanese national team at Rugby Park Stadium on 4 May 1982. He later continued to play for Southland in the National Provincial Championship, a further 4 times up until 1984. In that time, he was part of the Second Division-South Island winning side in 1982 and 1984. In 1982, he was selected for the New Zealand under 19s team, but like in 1980, he did not take part in any game. He did however play for the New Zealand Marist and New Zealand President's XV teams in 1982.

Between 1985 and 1988, Haig travelled to various countries to gain experience in different cultures; between 1985 and 1987, he represented the Johannesburg Pirates in South Africa, while in between 1985 and 1988 he represented London Scottish, Orrell R.U.F.C. and Richmond in England. He returned to New Zealand in 1989, playing for Bay of Plenty 'B' team, where he captained the team on 3 occasions. He was promoted to the main side in 1990, playing 48 times, including 4 as captain, between 1990 and 1996.

== Coaching career ==
Haig's coaching career began in 1991, where he took up a player-coaching role for Greerton Marist RFC between 1991 and 1993, during the off-season of the National Provincial Championship. In 1993, he travelled to Scotland, where again, he took up a player-coaching role for Edinburgh based side Preston Lodge RFC. He would have taken up a rugby development coaching role with the Scottish Rugby Union, but was unable to take up the position due to UK work visa requirements, which meant he returned home to New Zealand. Between 1995 and 1999, he returned as a player-coach for Mount Maunganui RFC in the Baywide competition, before retiring from rugby in mid 1999.

For the 2000 National Provincial Championship, Bay of Plenty signed Vern Cotter as their new head coach, and Cotter brought in Haig as his assistant. They formed a formidable pairing, leading the side to Champions in the Second Division and promotion to the First Division for 2001, and keeping the team afloat in the top division long term. In 2002, Haig signed with the New Zealand Rugby Union, where he became a Resource Coach for the union, which meant the NZRU would dictate which team and role Haig would have. After the 2002 NPC, Haig was transferred to Wanganui in the NPC Third Division. In his first year, he won the Third Division allowing Wanganui to promotion to the Second Division. He remained with the team until the end of the 2007 NPC Second Division season, where he led the team to a second successive runners-up position, as in 2008 he became the Counties Manukau head coach for three years. In his final year in 2011, he did additional work with Super Rugby franchise the Chiefs.

As a Resource Coach for the Union, Haig worked with several of the age grade national teams while signed with the Union. Between 2003 and 2011, he ran several training camps for the New Zealand under 17s, 19s and 20s teams before their respective international tournaments. He was also assistant coach for the New Zealand under 21s team in 2006 and 2007, and in 2008 he was an assistant coach for the Māori All Blacks during their winning 2008 IRB Pacific Nations Cup campaign.

In 2011, he was named as the Georgian national teams coach, taking over from Richie Dixon.

=== Georgia ===
In 2011, Haig was named as Georgia head coach, after being suggested by Vern Cotter, who was the GRU's first candidate, and the NZRU. His first match in charge would have been on 4 February 2012 against Ukraine, but was postponed due to weather. Which meant his first match in charge was against Spain, who were the victors 25–18. It was the first time Spain had beaten Georgia since 2007, but despite this, Georgia went on to secure a 32–7 win over Portugal two weeks later. Three more wins, including a 46–0 win over Russia, meant Haig led the team to first in the 2012 ENC, and first in the overall 2011–2012 season. In June 2012, the IRB introduced a new global rugby calendar, so that Tier 2 nations could play Tier 1 or intercontinental Tier 2 opposition more often. This meant on 16 and 23 June, Georgia played the United States and Canada in away fixtures. Unfortunately for Georgia, they lost both fixtures 36–20 and 31–12 respectively. The calendar continued into the end-of-year tests where Georgia hosted Japan, lost 25–22, and Fiji, lost 24–19.

In 2013, Georgia's campaign to qualify for the 2015 Rugby World Cup started, and to qualify, Haig had to lead the team to first or second in the 2012–14 European Nations Cup First Division. In the first year, Georgia finished top of the table with 19 points, narrowly ahead of Romania who were also on 19 points, but behind on points difference. But a 100% win rate in the 2014 season, saw Georgia top the table with 41 points and qualified for the World Cup as Europe 1. Qualifying as Europe 1, meant for Haig he would face his native country of New Zealand.

In April 2013, the IRB formed the IRB Tbilisi Cup, where Georgia would host various European teams and invitational sides from Ireland, South Africa and Argentina. In 2013, Haig led Georgia to third in the table, losing only narrowly, 20–15 to Emerging Ireland and 21–16 to South Africa President's XV. Haig almost led Georgia to a first ever victory over Argentina on 22 June 2013, but a 76-minute try by Tomás Cubelli, meant Georgia left San Juan 29–18. However, during the 2013 end-of-year rugby union internationals, Haig led Georgia to two victories from three, including a first ever victory for Georgia over Samoa, 16–15. They also beat Canada 19–15, but lost to the United States 25–23.

During the 2014 end-of-year rugby union internationals, Haig faced tough opposition at home and away. Firstly, Georgia had to face Tonga, who had Rugby World Cup winner coach Jake White in the coaching team. A second half surge gave Tonga a 23–9 victory, with the 3 tries in the game coming in the closing 15 minutes. A week later, a unique opportunity to face a Six Nations Championship side, in the likes of Ireland in Dublin. Despite only being 9–0 down at half time, Ireland pulled away in the second half winning 49–7. On 23 November 2013, Georgia faced Japan in Tbilisi. Georgia scored 5 tries in a 35–24 victory over the Brave Blossoms.

In February and March 2015, Haig led Georgia to their second consecutive Grand Slam in the 2015 ENC. He firstly led the team to a 64–8 win over Germany, before narrowly beating Portugal 20–15 at home. Against Spain he secured a 26–13 win in Madrid, a 33–0 win over Russia, before beating Romania 15–6 to retain the Antim Cup for 5 consecutive years. Unfortunately for Haig and Georgia, the team was unable to retain their form in the 2015 World Rugby Tbilisi Cup, where they lost back to back matches to Emerging Italy 26–10 and Emerging Ireland 45–12. They did however open the tournament with a 19–10 win over Uruguay.

Despite Georgia's poor record in 2015, Georgia had a successful 2015 Rugby World Cup campaign. Georgia finished third in their pool, which meant for the first time, they had automatically qualified for the next World Cup, in 2019. They opened with a 17–10 win over Tonga, before being heavily beaten by Argentina, 54–9, and New Zealand 43–10. However, Georgia were praised for being massively competitive in their game against New Zealand, causing the All Blacks problems at the scrum, break down and defence. Georgia finished with a 17–16 win over Namibia, despite being 6–0 down at half time.

In 2016, with wins over Germany (59–7), Portugal (29–3), Spain (38–7), Russia (24–7) and Romania (38–9), Haig led Georgia to a third consecutive Grand Slam title when Georgia won the 2016 ENC. This was backed up by an undefeated tour of the Pacific Islanders in June 2016. They drew with a weakened Samoa squad, which included 9 uncapped players, 19–all, before downing Tonga 23–20. On 24 June, Georgia defeated Fiji 14–3 to earn their first ever win over the Flying Fijians, and in doing so, moved to 11th in the World Rankings, Georgia's highest ever position. Georgia became the first team to keep Fiji tryless since Wales defeated them 66–0 in the 2011 Rugby World Cup. In November 2016, a inexperienced Japanese side defeated Georgia 28−22, though Georgia went onto earn a record winning margin score against Samoa, winning 20−16. On 26 November, Georgia traveled to Scotland to play their first tier 1 nation outside a Rugby World Cup, since Ireland in 2014. Scotland won 43–16.

The 2017 Rugby Europe Championship was the first time under Haig that Georgia did not win the Championship. Having beaten all opponents; Belgium 31–6, Germany 50–6, Spain 20–10 and Russia 28–14, leading into the final week the game against Romania was the Championship decider. For the first time since 2010, Romania beat Georgia, winning 8–7 to win the Championship. During the 2017 June internationals, Haig led Georgia to two victories on their Americas tour, defeating Canada 13–0 and the United States 21–17 in what was the first time Georgia had beaten both teams away. Their third game was a 45–29 loss to Argentina. During the 2017 Autumn Internationals, Haig led his side to two victories, defeating Canada 54–22, a record winning margin, and the United States 21–20. The only loss came against Wales in Cardiff, losing 13–6, in what was a first ever meeting for the two nations.

Haig led Georgia to reclaim the Rugby Europe Championship in 2018, winning all five games; defeating Belgium 47–0, Germany 64–0, Spain 23–10, Russia 29–9 and Romania 25–16 to reclaim the Antim Cup. In June 2018, Haig took Georgia to the first ever appearance at the World Rugby Pacific Nations Cup, where they faced Tonga and Fiji. Georgia won their first game 16–15, however lost to Fiji 37–15 in the second game to finish third, just behind Samoa. In addition to the Pacific Nations Cup, Georgia faced Japan in a one-off test match, in what was a historic biggest loss for Georgia against Japan, losing 28–0. The November test window saw the much anticipated test between Georgia and Italy take place, which the Italian side won 28–17. Georgia replied with a 20–9 victory over Tonga, their only other test match in the November window.

At the start of the World Cup year, Georgia convincingly won the 2019 Rugby Europe Championship, winning all five matches. They retained the title, 6 points clear of runners-up Spain.

== International matches as head coach ==
Note: World Rankings Column shows the World Ranking Georgia was placed at on the following Monday after each of their matches

Matches (2012–2019)
Match	Date	Opposition	Venue	Score (Geo.–Opponent)	Competition	Captain	World Ranking
2012
1	11 February	Spain	Estadio Nacional Complutense, Madrid	18–25	European Nations Cup	Alexander Todua	15th
2	25 February	Portugal	Dinamo Arena, Tbilisi	32–7	European Nations Cup	Davit Kacharava	15th
3	10 March	Romania	Stadionul Arcul de Triumf, Bucharest	19–13	European Nations Cup	Irakli Abuseridze	15th
4	17 March	Russia	Mikheil Meskhi Stadium, Tbilisi	46–0	European Nations Cup	Irakli Abuseridze	15th
5	9 June	Ukraine	Dinamo Arena, Tbilisi	33–3	European Nations Cup	Irakli Abuseridze	14th
6	16 June	United States	Infinity Park, Glendale	26–30	Summer Internationals	Irakli Abuseridze	15th
7	23 June	Canada	Swangard Stadium, Burnaby	12–31	Summer Internationals	Irakli Abuseridze	15th
8	17 November	Japan	Mikheil Meskhi Stadium, Tbilisi	22–25	Autumn Internationals	Irakli Abuseridze	17th
9	24 November	Fiji	Mikheil Meskhi Stadium, Tbilisi	19–24	Autumn Internationals	Irakli Abuseridze	17th
2013
10	2 February	Belgium	King Baudouin Stadium, Brussels	17–13	European Nations Cup	Giorgi Chkhaidze	17th
11	9 February	Portugal	Mikheil Meskhi Stadium, Tbilisi	25–12	European Nations Cup	Irakli Machkhaneli	17th
12	23 February	Russia	Sochi Central Stadium, Sochi	23–9	European Nations Cup	Irakli Machkhaneli	17th
13	9 March	Spain	Mikheil Meskhi Stadium, Tbilisi	61–18	European Nations Cup	Irakli Machkhaneli	17th
14	16 March	Romania	Stadionul Arcul de Triumf, Bucharest	9–9	European Nations Cup	Irakli Machkhaneli	17th
15	11 June	Uruguay	Avchala Stadium, Tbilisi	27–3	Tbilisi Cup	Irakli Machkhaneli	16th
16	22 June	Argentina	Estadio Bicentenario, San Juan	18–29	Summer International	Irakli Machkhaneli	16th
17	9 November	Canada	Dinamo Arena, Tbilisi	19–15	Autumn Internationals	Irakli Machkhaneli	16th
18	16 November	United States	Poladi Stadium, Rustavi	23–25	Autumn Internationals	Mamuka Gorgodze	17th
19	23 November	Samoa	Mikheil Meskhi Stadium, Tbilisi	16–15	Autumn Internationals	Mamuka Gorgodze	16th
2014
20	1 February	Belgium	Avchala Stadium, Tbilisi	35–0	European Nations Cup	Irakli Machkhaneli	16th
21	8 February	Portugal	Lisbon University Stadium, Lisbon	34–9	European Nations Cup	Irakli Machkhaneli	16th
22	22 February	Russia	Dinamo Arena, Tbilisi	36–10	European Nations Cup	Irakli Machkhaneli	16th
23	8 March	Spain	Estadio Nacional Complutense, Madrid	24–17	European Nations Cup	Irakli Machkhaneli	16th
24	15 March	Romania	Mikheil Meskhi Stadium, Tbilisi	22–9	European Nations Cup	Irakli Machkhaneli	16th
25	14 June	Spain	Avchala Stadium, Tbilisi	23–13	Tbilisi Cup	Shalva Sutiashvili	15th
26	8 November	Tonga	Mikheil Meskhi Stadium, Tbilisi	9–23	Autumn Internationals	Irakli Machkhaneli	15th
27	16 November	Ireland	Aviva Stadium, Dublin	7–49	Autumn Internationals	Davit Kacharava	15th
28	23 November	Japan	Mikheil Meskhi Stadium, Tbilisi	35–24	Autumn Internationals	Davit Kacharava	15th
2015
29	7 February	Germany	Sportpark Martinsee, Heusenstamm	64–8	European Nations Cup	Shalva Sutiashvili	15th
30	14 February	Portugal	Mikheil Meskhi Stadium, Tbilisi	20–15	European Nations Cup	Shalva Sutiashvili	15th
31	28 February	Spain	Estadio Nacional Complutense, Madrid	26–13	European Nations Cup	Shalva Sutiashvili	15th
32	14 March	Russia	Mikheil Meskhi Stadium, Tbilisi	33–0	European Nations Cup	Shalva Sutiashvili	15th
33	21 March	Romania	Stadionul Arcul de Triumf, Bucharest	15–6	European Nations Cup	Shalva Sutiashvili	14th
34	13 June	Uruguay	Avchala Stadium, Tbilisi	19–10	Tbilisi Cup	Levan Datunashvili	14th
35	2 September	Canada	Molesey Road, Esher, England	15–16	RWC Warm-ups	Mamuka Gorgodze	16th
36	5 September	Japan	Kingsholm, Gloucester, England	10–13	RWC Warm-ups	Mamuka Gorgodze	16th
37	19 September	Tonga	Kingsholm, Gloucester, England	17–10	Rugby World Cup	Mamuka Gorgodze	13th
38	25 September	Argentina	Kingsholm, Gloucester, England	9–54	Rugby World Cup	Mamuka Gorgodze	15th
39	2 October	New Zealand	Millennium Stadium, Cardiff, Wales	10–43	Rugby World Cup	Mamuka Gorgodze	14th
40	7 October	Namibia	Sandy Park, Exeter, England	17–16	Rugby World Cup	Mamuka Gorgodze	14th
2016
41	6 February	Germany	Avchala Stadium, Tbilisi	59–7	European Nations Cup	Shalva Sutiashvili	14th
42	13 February	Portugal	Lisbon University Stadium, Lisbon	29–3	European Nations Cup	Shalva Sutiashvili	14th
43	17 February	Spain	Mikheil Meskhi Stadium, Tbilisi	38–7	European Nations Cup	Shalva Sutiashvili	13th
44	12 March	Russia	Sochi Central Stadium, Sochi	24–7	European Nations Cup	Shalva Sutiashvili	12th
45	15 March	Romania	Mikheil Meskhi Stadium, Tbilisi	38–9	European Nations Cup	Shalva Sutiashvili	12th
46	14 June	Samoa	Apia Park, Apia	19–19	Pacific Islands tour	Shalva Sutiashvili	12th
47	18 June	Tonga	ANZ National Stadium, Suva, Fiji	23–20	Pacific Islands tour	Shalva Sutiashvili	12th
48	24 June	Fiji	ANZ National Stadium, Suva	14–3	Pacific Islands tour	Shalva Sutiashvili	11th
49	12 November	Japan	Mikheil Meskhi Stadium, Tbilisi	22–28	Autumn Internationals	Mamuka Gorgodze	15th
50	19 November	Samoa	Mikheil Meskhi Stadium, Tbilisi	20–16	Autumn Internationals	Mamuka Gorgodze	12th
51	26 November	Scotland	Rugby Park, Kilmarnock	16–43	Autumn Internationals	Mamuka Gorgodze	12th
2017
52	11 February	Belgium	King Baudouin Stadium, Brussels	31–6	Rugby Europe Championship	Merab Kvirikashvili	12th
53	19 February	Germany	Rustavi Rugby Stadium, Rustavi	50–6	Rugby Europe Championship	Merab Sharikadze	12th
54	4 March	Spain	Estadio Municipal, Medina del Campo	20–10	Rugby Europe Championship	Merab Sharikadze	12th
55	12 March	Russia	Dinamo Arena, Tbilisi	28–14	Rugby Europe Championship	Mamuka Gorgodze	12th
56	19 March	Romania	Stadionul Arcul de Triumf, Bucharest	7–8	Rugby Europe Championship	Mamuka Gorgodze	12th
57	10 June	Canada	Calgary Rugby Park, Calgary	13–0	Americas tour	Merab Sharikadze	12th
58	17 June	United States	Fifth Third Bank Stadium, Kennesaw	21–17	Americas tour	Merab Sharikadze	12th
59	24 June	Argentina	Estadio 23 de Agosto, Jujuy	29–45	Americas tour	Merab Sharikadze	12th
60	11 November	Canada	Dinamo Arena, Tbilisi	54–22	Autumn Internationals	Merab Sharikadze	12th
61	18 November	Wales	Millennium Stadium, Cardiff	6–13	Autumn Internationals	Merab Sharikadze	12th
62	25 November	United States	Mikheil Meskhi Stadium, Tbilisi	21–20	Autumn Internationals	Merab Sharikadze	12th
2018
63	10 February	Belgium	AIA Arena, Kutaisi	47–0	Rugby Europe Championship	Giorgi Nemsadze	12th
64	17 February	Germany	Sparda-Bank-Hessen-Stadion, Offenbach am Main	64–0	Rugby Europe Championship	Giorgi Nemsadze	12th
65	3 March	Spain	Mikheil Meskhi Stadium, Tbilisi	23–10	Rugby Europe Championship	Giorgi Nemsadze	12th
66	10 March	Russia	Kuban Stadium, Krasnodar	29–9	Rugby Europe Championship	Giorgi Nemsadze	12th
67	18 March	Romania	Dinamo Arena, Tbilisi	25–16	Rugby Europe Championship	Giorgi Nemsadze	12th
68	9 June	Tonga	ANZ National Stadium, Suva	16–15	Pacific Nations Cup	Giorgi Nemsadze	12th
69	16 June	Fiji	ANZ National Stadium, Suva	15–37	Pacific Nations Cup	Giorgi Nemsadze	12th
70	24 June	Japan	Toyota Stadium, Toyota	0–28	June test match	Giorgi Nemsadze	13th
71	10 November	Italy	Stadio Artemio Franchi, Florence	17–28	Autumn Internationals	Merab Sharikadze	14th
72	17 November	Samoa	Avchala Stadium, Tbilisi	27–19	Autumn Internationals	Merab Sharikadze	13th
73	24 November	Tonga	Mikheil Meskhi Stadium, Tbilisi	28–19	Autumn Internationals	Merab Sharikadze	13th
2019
74	9 February	Romania	Cluj Arena, Cluj	18–9	Rugby Europe Championship	Merab Sharikadze	12th
75	17 February	Spain	Avchala Stadium, Tbilisi	24–10	Rugby Europe Championship	Giorgi Nemsadze	12th
76	2 March	Belgium	King Baudouin Stadium, Brussels	46–6	Rugby Europe Championship	Merab Sharikadze	12th
77	10 March	Germany	AIA Arena, Kutaisi	52–3	Rugby Europe Championship	Merab Sharikadze	12th
78	18 March	Russia	Kuban Stadium, Krasnodar	22–6	Rugby Europe Championship	Merab Sharikadze	12th
79	31 August	Scotland	Dinamo Arena, Tbilisi	10–44	RWC Warm-ups	Mikheil Nariashvili	12th
80	6 September	Scotland	Murrayfield Stadium, Edinburgh	9–36	RWC Warm-ups	Mikheil Nariashvili	12th
81	23 September	Wales	City of Toyota Stadium, Toyota	14–43	Rugby World Cup	Mikheil Nariashvili	12th
82	29 September	Uruguay	Kumagaya Rugby Stadium, Kumagaya	33–7	Rugby World Cup	Jaba Bregvadze	11th
83	3 October	Fiji	Hanazono Rugby Stadium, Higashiosaka	10–45	Rugby World Cup	Merab Sharikadze	14th
84	11 October	Australia	Shizuoka Stadium Ecopa, Fukuroi	8–27	Rugby World Cup	Merab Sharikadze	14th

== Record by country ==
Opponent	Played	Won	Drew	Lost	Win ratio (%)	For	Against
Argentina	3	0	0	3	0	56	128
Australia	1	0	0	1	0	8	27
Belgium	5	5	0	0	100	176	25
Canada	5	3	0	2	60	113	84
Fiji	4	1	0	3	25	58	109
Germany	5	5	0	0	100	289	24
Ireland	1	0	0	1	0	7	49
Italy	1	0	0	1	0	17	28
Japan	5	1	0	4	20	89	118
Namibia	1	1	0	0	100	17	16
New Zealand	1	0	0	1	0	10	43
Portugal	5	5	0	0	100	140	46
Romania	8	6	1	1	75	153	79
Russia	8	8	0	0	100	241	55
Samoa	4	3	1	0	75	82	69
Scotland	3	0	0	3	0	35	123
Spain	9	8	0	1	89	257	123
Tonga	5	4	0	1	80	93	87
Ukraine	1	1	0	0	100	33	3
United States	4	2	0	2	50	91	92
Uruguay	3	3	0	0	100	77	20
Wales	2	0	0	2	0	20	56
TOTAL	84	56	2	26	67	2008	1176

== Honours ==
- Rugby Europe Championships
  - Grand Slam: 2014, 2015, 2016, 2018, 2019
  - Winners: 2012, 2013, 2014, 2015, 2016, 2018, 2019
  - Runners-up: 2017
- Antim Cup
  - Winners: 2012, 2013, 2014, 2015, 2016, 2018, 2019
- IRB Tbilisi Cup
  - Runners-up: 2014
  - Third: 2013, 2015

Preceded by (Scotland) Richie Dixon	Georgian national rugby coach 2012-present	Succeeded by
