= 2019 Rugby World Cup Pool D =

External videos
- Rugby World Cup 2019: Fiji v Uruguay on YouTube

Pool D of the 2019 Rugby World Cup began on 21 September 2019. The pool included 2015 runners-up and quarter-finalists Australia and Wales. They were joined by Georgia, who automatically qualified for the first ever time. They were joined by regional qualifiers from the Americas, Uruguay (Americas 2), and Oceania, Fiji (Oceania 1).

Wales and Australia qualified for the quarter-finals, with Wales taking top spot in the pool courtesy of a 29–25 win over the Wallabies in the two sides' second match of the tournament. Fiji, Georgia and Uruguay each won one match, but three bonus points for Fiji meant they finished in third place and qualified for the 2023 Rugby World Cup.

== Overview ==
Pool D opened with Australia beating Fiji by 18 points in Sapporo after Fiji led by two points at half-time. Australia scored four tries in the second half for the bonus point. Wales beat Georgia 43–14 at City of Toyota Stadium, after leading 29–0 at half-time and 22–0 after three tries in the first 19 minutes. In Kamaishi, Fiji scored the opening try against Uruguay. Two mistakes within eight minutes gave Teros the lead before a try from Juan Manuel Cat enhanced it to 12 points at half-time. Three Fijian tries in the second half were to no avail as two penalty goals from Felipe Berchesi gave Uruguay their first win in a World Cup since 2003. In Kumagaya on 29 September, Georgia recorded a 33–7 win over Uruguay. Dominant work by their forwards in the second half laid the foundation for the bonus-point victory. Over in Chōfu, Dan Biggar scored the fastest drop goal in World Cup history as Wales led 23–8 at the half. Two second-half tries from Australia brought the scores to within a point but the Welsh held out for a 29–25 win.

A second half performance from Fiji at a wet Hanazono Rugby Stadium saw the Fijians record their first win of their 2019 World Cup campaign as they won 45–10 over Georgia. This was partly due to Semi Radradra scoring two tries while also aiding in setting up three more tries as Fiji scored seven tries to one in the bonus-point victory. Another slow start for the Australians in their game with Uruguay did not stop them from recording a win over the South Americans, with Tevita Kuridrani and Dane Haylett-Petty each getting two tries in the 35-point victory at Ōita Stadium. Four days later at the same stadium, Fiji got off to a 10–0 lead with the tries coming from Josua Tuisova and Kini Murimurivalu within eight minutes. Fiji would hold their lead until the 31st minute when Josh Adams scored his second try of three for the match. Wales increased their lead from there to win 29–17, qualifying for the quarter-finals with Australia. The penultimate match of Pool D saw Australia outlast a tough Georgia in difficult conditions in Fukuroi, as they won 27–8. Wales would finish undefeated with a 35–13 win over Uruguay at Kumamoto Stadium to record a bonus-point victory and set up a quarter-final with France while Australia came in second.

== Standings ==
Pos	Team	Pld	W	D	L	PF	PA	PD	T	B	Pts	Qualification
1	Wales	4	4	0	0	136	69	+67	17	3	19	Advanced to the quarter-finals and qualified for the 2023 Rugby World Cup
2	Australia	4	3	0	1	136	68	+68	20	4	16	Advanced to the quarter-finals and qualified for the 2023 Rugby World Cup
3	Fiji	4	1	0	3	110	108	+2	17	3	7	Eliminated but qualified for 2023 Rugby World Cup
4	Georgia	4	1	0	3	65	122	−57	9	1	5	
5	Uruguay	4	1	0	3	60	140	−80	6	0	4	

== Matches ==
All times are local Japan Standard Time (UTC+09)

=== Australia vs Fiji ===
21 September 2019
13:45 JST (UTC+09)

(1 BP) Australia	39–21	Fiji
Try: Hooper 18' c Hodge 36' m Latu (2) 57' m, 62' m Kerevi 69' c Koroibete 73' c Con: Lealiifano (1/2) 19'; To'omua (2/3) 70', 74'; Pen: Hodge (1/1) 51'	Report	Try: Yato 9' m Nayacalevu 44' c Con: Volavola (1/2) 46'; Pen: Volavola (3/3) 5', 23', 31'

Sapporo Dome, Sapporo
Attendance: 36,482
Referee: Ben O'Keeffe (New Zealand)

Australia	Fiji

FB	15	Kurtley Beale	(substituted off) 70'
RW	14	Reece Hodge
OC	13	James O'Connor
IC	12	Samu Kerevi
LW	11	Marika Koroibete
FH	10	Christian Lealiifano	(substituted off) 59'
SH	9	Nic White	(substituted off) 52'
N8	8	Isi Naisarani	(substituted off) 57'
OF	7	Michael Hooper (c)
BF	6	David Pocock
RL	5	Rory Arnold	(substituted off) 68'
LL	4	Izack Rodda
TP	3	Allan Alaalatoa	(substituted off) 63'
HK	2	Tolu Latu	(substituted off) 63'
LP	1	Scott Sio	(substituted off) 63'
Replacements:
HK	16	Jordan Uelese	(substituted on) 63'
PR	17	James Slipper	(substituted on) 63'
PR	18	Sekope Kepu	(substituted on) 63'
LK	19	Adam Coleman	(substituted on) 68'
FL	20	Lukhan Salakaia-Loto	(substituted on) 57'
SH	21	Will Genia	(substituted on) 52'
CE	22	Matt To'omua	(substituted on) 59'
FB	23	Dane Haylett-Petty	(substituted on) 70'
Coach:
(Australia) Michael Cheika

FB	15	Kini Murimurivalu		(substituted off) 74'
RW	14	Josua Tuisova		(substituted off) 62'
OC	13	Waisea Nayacalevu
IC	12	Levani Botia	(yellow card) 61'
LW	11	Semi Radradra
FH	10	Ben Volavola
SH	9	Frank Lomani		(substituted off) 71'
N8	8	Viliame Mata		(substituted off) 40'
OF	7	Peceli Yato		(substituted off) 25'
BF	6	Dominiko Waqaniburotu (c)
RL	5	Leone Nakarawa
LL	4	Tevita Cavubati
TP	3	Peni Ravai		(substituted off) 57'
HK	2	Sam Matavesi		(substituted off) 74'
LP	1	Campese Ma'afu		(substituted off) 57'
Replacements:
HK	16	Ratu Veremalua Vugakoto		(substituted on) 74'
PR	17	Eroni Mawi		(substituted on) 57'
PR	18	Manasa Saulo		(substituted on) 57'
LK	19	Tevita Ratuva		(substituted on) 40'
FL	20	Mosese Voka		(substituted on) 25'
SH	21	Nikola Matawalu		(substituted on) 71'
FH	22	Alivereti Veitokani		(substituted on) 74'
WG	23	Vereniki Goneva		(substituted on) 63'
Coach:
(New Zealand) John McKee

Player of the Match:
Tolu Latu (Australia)

Assistant referees:
Luke Pearce (England)
Andrew Brace (Ireland)
Television match official:
Rowan Kitt (England)

=== Wales vs Georgia ===
23 September 2019
19:15 JST (UTC+09)

(1 BP) Wales	43–14	Georgia
Try: Jo. Davies 3' m Tipuric 13' c Adams 19' c L. Williams 40' c T. Williams 65' c North 76' c Con: Biggar (4/5) 14', 20', 40', 66'; Halfpenny (1/1) 77'; Pen: Biggar (1/1) 7'	Report	Try: Mamukashvili 43' c Chilachava 69' c Con: Abzhandadze (2/2) 44', 70'

City of Toyota Stadium, Toyota
Attendance: 35,546
Referee: Luke Pearce (England)

Wales	Georgia

FB	15	Liam Williams	(substituted off) 62'
RW	14	George North
OC	13	Jonathan Davies
IC	12	Hadleigh Parkes
LW	11	Josh Adams
FH	10	Dan Biggar	(substituted off) 67'
SH	9	Gareth Davies	(substituted off) 48'
N8	8	Josh Navidi
OF	7	Justin Tipuric
BF	6	Aaron Wainwright	(substituted off) 51'
RL	5	Alun Wyn Jones (c)
LL	4	Jake Ball	(substituted off) 62'
TP	3	Tomas Francis	(substituted off) 47'
HK	2	Ken Owens	(substituted off) 56'
LP	1	Wyn Jones	(substituted off) 56'
Replacements:
HK	16	Elliot Dee	(substituted on) 56'
PR	17	Nicky Smith	(substituted on) 56'
PR	18	Dillon Lewis	(substituted on) 47'
FL	19	Aaron Shingler	(substituted on) 62'
N8	20	Ross Moriarty	(substituted on) 51'
SH	21	Tomos Williams	(substituted on) 48'
FH	22	Rhys Patchell	(substituted on) 67'
FB	23	Leigh Halfpenny	(substituted on) 62'
Coach:
(New Zealand) Warren Gatland

FB	15	Soso Matiashvili		(substituted off) 77'
RW	14	Mirian Modebadze
OC	13	Davit Kacharava
IC	12	Tamaz Mchedlidze
LW	11	Giorgi Kveseladze
FH	10	Tedo Abzhandadze
SH	9	Vasil Lobzhanidze		(substituted off) 60'
N8	8	Beka Gorgadze		(substituted off) 60'
OF	7	Mamuka Gorgodze
BF	6	Giorgi Tkhilaishvili			(substituted off) 55'
RL	5	Konstantin Mikautadze		(substituted off) 51'
LL	4	Giorgi Nemsadze
TP	3	Beka Gigashvili		(substituted off) 47'	(substituted on) 79'
HK	2	Shalva Mamukashvili		(substituted off) 47'	(substituted on) 55'	(substituted off) 58'
LP	1	Mikheil Nariashvili (c)		(substituted off) 47'
Replacements:
HK	16	Jaba Bregvadze	(yellow card) 48'	(substituted on) 47'
PR	17	Guram Gogichashvili		(substituted on) 47'
PR	18	Levan Chilachava		(substituted on) 47'	(substituted off) 79'
LK	19	Shalva Sutiashvili		(substituted on) 51'
FL	20	Beka Saghinadze				(substituted on) 58'
FL	21	Otar Giorgadze		(substituted on) 60'
SH	22	Gela Aprasidze		(substituted on) 60'
FH	23	Lasha Khmaladze		(substituted on) 77'
Coach:
(New Zealand) Milton Haig

Player of the Match:
Jake Ball (Wales)

Assistant referees:
Ben O'Keeffe (New Zealand)
Matthew Carley (England)
Television match official:
Rowan Kitt (England)

Notes:

- Levan Chilachava (Georgia) earned his 50th test cap.
- Alun Wyn Jones equalled Gethin Jenkins record as the most capped player for Wales with 129 caps.
- Jonathan Davies' try was the fastest scored by a Welsh player at a Rugby World Cup.

=== Fiji vs Uruguay ===
25 September 2019
14:15 JST (UTC+09)

(2 BP) Fiji	27–30	Uruguay
Try: Dolokoto 8' m Mawi 19' c Ratuniyarawa 48' m Matawalu (2) 67' m, 80+1' m Con: J. Matavesi (1/3) 20'	Report	Try: Arata 14' c Diana 22' c Cat 26' c Con: Berchesi (3/3) 15', 23', 28'; Pen: Berchesi (3/4) 38', 61', 76'

Kamaishi Recovery Memorial Stadium, Kamaishi
Attendance: 14,025
Referee: Pascal Gaüzère (France)

Fiji	Uruguay

FB	15	Alivereti Veitokani	(substituted off) 52'
RW	14	Filipo Nakosi	(substituted off) 61'
OC	13	Semi Radradra
IC	12	Jale Vatubua
LW	11	Vereniki Goneva
FH	10	Josh Matavesi
SH	9	Henry Seniloli	(substituted off) 57'
N8	8	Leone Nakarawa
OF	7	Mosese Voka	(substituted off) 71'
BF	6	Dominiko Waqaniburotu (c)
RL	5	Api Ratuniyarawa
LL	4	Tevita Ratuva	(substituted off) 69'
TP	3	Manasa Saulo	(substituted off) 69'
HK	2	Mesu Dolokoto	(substituted off) 69'
LP	1	Eroni Mawi	(substituted off) 61'
Replacements:
HK	16	Ratu Veremalua Vugakoto	(substituted on) 69'
PR	17	Campese Ma'afu	(substituted on) 61'
PR	18	Lee Roy Atalifo	(substituted on) 61'
LK	19	Tevita Cavubati	(substituted on) 69'
HK	20	Sam Matavesi	(substituted on) 71'
SH	21	Nikola Matawalu	(substituted on) 57'
FH	22	Ben Volavola	(substituted on) 52'
CE	23	Levani Botia	(substituted on) 61'
Coach:
(New Zealand) John McKee

FB	15	Gastón Mieres	(substituted off) 61'
RW	14	Nicolás Freitas
OC	13	Juan Manuel Cat	(substituted off) 38'	(substituted on) 40'	(substituted off) 69'
IC	12	Andrés Vilaseca
LW	11	Rodrigo Silva
FH	10	Felipe Berchesi
SH	9	Santiago Arata	(substituted off) 57'
N8	8	Manuel Diana	(substituted off) 57'
OF	7	Santiago Civetta
BF	6	Juan Manuel Gaminara (c)
RL	5	Manuel Leindekar
LL	4	Ignacio Dotti	(substituted off) 69'	(substituted on) 77'
TP	3	Diego Arbelo	(substituted off) 50'
HK	2	Germán Kessler	(substituted off) 78'
LP	1	Mateo Sanguinetti	(substituted off) 57'
Replacements:
HK	16	Guillermo Pujadas	(substituted on) 78'
PR	17	Facundo Gattas	(substituted on) 57'
PR	18	Juan Rombys	(substituted on) 50'
FL	19	Franco Lamanna	(substituted on) 69'	(substituted off) 77'
FL	20	Juan Diego Ormaechea	(substituted on) 57'
SH	21	Agustín Ormaechea	(substituted on) 57'
FB	22	Felipe Echeverry	(substituted on) 61'
CE	23	Tomás Inciarte	(substituted on) 38'	(substituted off) 40'	(substituted on) 69'
Coach:
(Argentina) Esteban Meneses

Player of the Match:
Felipe Berchesi (Uruguay)

Assistant referees:
Angus Gardner (Australia)
Andrew Brace (Ireland)
Television match official:
Marius Jonker (South Africa)

Notes:

- Germán Kessler (Uruguay) earned his 50th test cap.
- This was Uruguay's first Rugby World Cup win since beating Georgia at the 2003 Rugby World Cup.
- This was Uruguay's first win over a Pacific Island nation.
- This was the first time that Uruguay has defeated a team that were placed in the top 10 of the World Rugby Rankings.

=== Georgia vs Uruguay ===
29 September 2019
14:15 JST (UTC+09)

(1 BP) Georgia	33–7	Uruguay
Try: Todua 9' m Giorgadze 30' c Chilachava 43' c Bregvadze 52' c Kveseladze 58' c Con: Abzhandadze (4/5) 30', 44', 53', 59'	Report	Try: Vilaseca 33' c Con: Berchesi (1/1) 34'

Kumagaya Rugby Stadium, Kumagaya
Attendance: 24,895
Referee: Wayne Barnes (England)

Georgia	Uruguay

FB	15	Lasha Khmaladze	(substituted off) 73'
RW	14	Zurab Dzneladze
OC	13	Giorgi Kveseladze
IC	12	Lasha Malaghuradze	(substituted off) 60'
LW	11	Alexander Todua
FH	10	Tedo Abzhandadze
SH	9	Gela Aprasidze	(substituted off) 68'
N8	8	Otar Giorgadze
OF	7	Beka Saghinadze
BF	6	Shalva Sutiashvili	(substituted off) 78'
RL	5	Konstantin Mikautadze	(substituted off) 60'
LL	4	Lasha Lomidze
TP	3	Levan Chilachava	(substituted off) 49'
HK	2	Jaba Bregvadze (c)	(substituted off) 65'
LP	1	Guram Gogichashvili
Replacements:
HK	16	Vano Karkadze	(substituted on) 65'
PR	17	Beka Gigashvili
PR	18	Giorgi Melikidze	(substituted on) 49'
LK	19	Mamuka Gorgodze	(substituted on) 60'
FL	20	Beka Gorgadze	(substituted on) 78'
SH	21	Vasil Lobzhanidze	(substituted on) 68'
CE	22	Merab Sharikadze	(substituted on) 60'
FB	23	Soso Matiashvili	(substituted on) 73'
Coach:
(New Zealand) Milton Haig

FB	15	Gastón Mieres		(substituted off) 40'
RW	14	Nicolás Freitas		(substituted off) 64'
OC	13	Juan Manuel Cat
IC	12	Andrés Vilaseca
LW	11	Rodrigo Silva
FH	10	Felipe Berchesi
SH	9	Santiago Arata
N8	8	Alejandro Nieto
OF	7	Santiago Civetta		(substituted off) 60'
BF	6	Juan Manuel Gaminara (c)		(substituted off) 60'
RL	5	Manuel Leindekar
LL	4	Ignacio Dotti		(substituted off) 64'
TP	3	Juan Rombys		(substituted off) 47'
HK	2	Germán Kessler		(substituted off) 60'
LP	1	Mateo Sanguinetti		(substituted off) 47'
Replacements:
HK	16	Facundo Gattas	(red card) 77'	(substituted on) 47'
PR	17	Juan Echeverría		(substituted on) 60'
PR	18	Diego Arbelo		(substituted on) 47'
LK	19	Diego Magno		(substituted on) 64'
FL	20	Juan Diego Ormaechea		(substituted on) 60'
FL	21	Manuel Ardao		(substituted on) 60'
SH	22	Agustín Ormaechea		(substituted on) 64'
WG	23	Leandro Leivas		(substituted on) 40'
Coach:
(Argentina) Esteban Meneses

Player of the Match:
Otar Giorgadze (Georgia)

Assistant referees:
Paul Williams (New Zealand)
Alexandre Ruiz (France)
Television match official:
Marius Jonker (South Africa)

Notes:

- Facundo Gattas' red card meant that Uruguay became the first team to receive red cards in two consecutive World Cups.
- Georgia's first try was the first try Georgia had ever failed to convert at a Rugby World Cup.
- This was the first time that Georgia gained a Try Bonus Point.

=== Australia vs Wales ===
29 September 2019
16:45 JST (UTC+09)

(1 BP) Australia	25–29	Wales
Try: Ashley-Cooper 21' m Haylett-Petty 46' c Hooper 62' c Con: To'omua (2/2) 48', 63'; Pen: Foley (1/1) 29'; To'omua (1/1) 68'	Report	Try: Parkes 13' c G. Davies 38' c Con: Biggar (1/1) 14'; Patchell (1/1) 39'; Pen: Patchell (3/3) 33', 37', 72'; Drop: Biggar (1/2) 1'; Patchell (1/1) 44'

Tokyo Stadium, Chōfu
Attendance: 47,885
Referee: Romain Poite (France)

Australia	Wales

FB	15	Dane Haylett-Petty
RW	14	Adam Ashley-Cooper	(substituted off) 48'
OC	13	James O'Connor
IC	12	Samu Kerevi
LW	11	Marika Koroibete
FH	10	Bernard Foley	(substituted off) 45'
SH	9	Will Genia	(substituted off) 53'
N8	8	Isi Naisarani	(substituted off) 68'
OF	7	Michael Hooper (c)
BF	6	David Pocock
RL	5	Rory Arnold	(substituted off) 63'
LL	4	Izack Rodda
TP	3	Allan Alaalatoa	(substituted off) 63'
HK	2	Tolu Latu	(substituted off) 66'
LP	1	Scott Sio	(substituted off) 63'
Replacements:
HK	16	Jordan Uelese	(substituted on) 66'
PR	17	James Slipper	(substituted on) 63'
PR	18	Sekope Kepu	(substituted on) 63'
LK	19	Adam Coleman	(substituted on) 63'
FL	20	Lukhan Salakaia-Loto	(substituted on) 68'
SH	21	Nic White	(substituted on) 53'
CE	22	Matt To'omua	(substituted on) 45'
FB	23	Kurtley Beale	(substituted on) 48'
Coach:
(Australia) Michael Cheika

FB	15	Liam Williams
RW	14	George North
OC	13	Jonathan Davies
IC	12	Hadleigh Parkes	(substituted off) 70'
LW	11	Josh Adams
FH	10	Dan Biggar	(substituted off) 28'
SH	9	Gareth Davies	(substituted off) 71'
N8	8	Josh Navidi
OF	7	Justin Tipuric
BF	6	Aaron Wainwright	(substituted off) 49'
RL	5	Alun Wyn Jones (c)
LL	4	Jake Ball	(substituted off) 63'
TP	3	Tomas Francis	(substituted off) 63'
HK	2	Ken Owens	(substituted off) 66'
LP	1	Wyn Jones	(substituted off) 49'
Replacements:
HK	16	Elliot Dee	(substituted on) 66'
PR	17	Nicky Smith	(substituted on) 49'
PR	18	Dillon Lewis	(substituted on) 63'
FL	19	Aaron Shingler	(substituted on) 63'
N8	20	Ross Moriarty	(substituted on) 49'
SH	21	Tomos Williams	(substituted on) 71'
FH	22	Rhys Patchell	(substituted on) 28'
CE	23	Owen Watkin	(substituted on) 70'
Coach:
(New Zealand) Warren Gatland

Player of the Match:
Gareth Davies (Wales)

Assistant referees:
Luke Pearce (England)
Karl Dickson (England)
Television match official:
Ben Skeen (New Zealand)

Notes:

- James O'Connor (Australia) earned his 50th test cap.
- Alun Wyn Jones became the most capped player for Wales with 130 caps, surpassing Gethin Jenkins record of 129.
- Dan Biggar scored the fastest drop goal in Rugby World Cup history, with the referee signalling the score after 36 seconds.

=== Georgia vs Fiji ===
3 October 2019
14:15 JST (UTC+09)

Georgia	10–45	Fiji (1 BP)
Try: Gorgodze 53' c Con: Matiashvili (1/1) 55'; Pen: Matiashvili (1/2) 35'	Report	Try: Nayacalevu 20' c Lomani 45' m Tuisova 50' m Radradra (2) 61' c, 76' c Kunatani 68' c Ratuniyarawa 70' c Con: Volavola (5/7) 21', 63', 70', 72', 77'

Hanazono Rugby Stadium, Higashiōsaka
Attendance: 21,069
Referee: Paul Williams (New Zealand)

Georgia	Fiji

FB	15	Soso Matiashvili
RW	14	Giorgi Kveseladze
OC	13	Davit Kacharava
IC	12	Merab Sharikadze (c)	(substituted off) 44'	(substituted on) 56'	(substituted off) 71'
LW	11	Alexander Todua	(substituted off) 74'
FH	10	Lasha Khmaladze
SH	9	Vasil Lobzhanidze	(substituted off) 67'
N8	8	Beka Gorgadze
OF	7	Mamuka Gorgodze
BF	6	Giorgi Tkhilaishvili	(substituted off) 53'
RL	5	Konstantin Mikautadze	(substituted off) 53'
LL	4	Giorgi Nemsadze
TP	3	Beka Gigashvili	(substituted off) 67'	(substituted on) 79'
HK	2	Shalva Mamukashvili	(substituted off) 59'
LP	1	Mikheil Nariashvili	(substituted off) 59'
Replacements:
HK	16	Jaba Bregvadze	(substituted on) 59'
PR	17	Guram Gogichashvili	(substituted on) 59'
PR	18	Levan Chilachava	(substituted on) 67'	(substituted off) 79'
FL	19	Otar Giorgadze	(substituted on) 53'
FL	20	Beka Saghinadze	(substituted on) 53'
SH	21	Gela Aprasidze	(substituted on) 67'
FH	22	Lasha Malaguradze	(substituted on) 44'	(substituted off) 56'	(substituted on) 71'
WG	23	Mirian Modebadze	(substituted on) 74'
Coach:
(New Zealand) Milton Haig

FB	15	Kini Murimurivalu	(substituted off) 74'
RW	14	Josua Tuisova
OC	13	Waisea Nayacalevu	(substituted off) 71'
IC	12	Levani Botia
LW	11	Semi Radradra
FH	10	Ben Volavola
SH	9	Frank Lomani	(substituted off) 76'
N8	8	Peceli Yato	(substituted off) 64'
OF	7	Semi Kunatani
BF	6	Dominiko Waqaniburotu (c)
RL	5	Leone Nakarawa
LL	4	Tevita Cavubati	(substituted off) 64'
TP	3	Manasa Saulo	(substituted off) 71'
HK	2	Sam Matavesi	(substituted off) 71'
LP	1	Campese Ma'afu	(substituted off) 56'
Replacements:
HK	16	Ratu Veremalua Vugakoto	(substituted on) 71'
PR	17	Peni Ravai	(substituted on) 56'
PR	18	Lee Roy Atalifo	(substituted on) 71'
LK	19	Api Ratuniyarawa	(substituted on) 64'
N8	20	Viliame Mata	(substituted on) 64'
SH	21	Nikola Matawalu	(substituted on) 76'
CE	22	Jale Vatubua	(substituted on) 71'
CE	23	Josh Matavesi	(substituted on) 74'
Coach:
(New Zealand) John McKee

Player of the Match:
Semi Radradra (Fiji)

Assistant referees:
Jaco Peyper (South Africa)
Matthew Carley (England)
Television match official:
Graham Hughes (England)

Notes:

- This is Fiji's biggest winning margin over Georgia.

=== Australia vs Uruguay ===
5 October 2019
14:15 JST (UTC+09)

(1 BP) Australia	45–10	Uruguay
Try: Haylett-Petty (2) 6' c, 68' m Petaia 24' c Kuridrani (2) 31' m, 46' c Genia 53' c Slipper 61' c Con: Lealiifano (5/7) 7', 25', 48', 55', 63'	Report	Try: Diana 79' c Con: Berchesi (1/1) 79'; Pen: Berchesi (1/1) 13'

Oita Stadium, Ōita
Attendance: 33,781
Referee: Mathieu Raynal (France)

Australia	Uruguay

FB	15	Kurtley Beale
RW	14	Dane Haylett-Petty
OC	13	Tevita Kuridrani
IC	12	Matt To'omua
LW	11	Jordan Petaia		(substituted off) 40'
FH	10	Christian Lealiifano
SH	9	Nic White		(substituted off) 51'
N8	6	Jack Dempsey
OF	7	Michael Hooper (c)		(substituted off) 51'
BF	8	Lukhan Salakaia-Loto	(yellow card) 30'
RL	5	Adam Coleman	(yellow card) 14'
LL	4	Rob Simmons
TP	3	Allan Alaalatoa		(substituted off) 51'
HK	2	Folau Fainga'a		(substituted off) 62'
LP	1	James Slipper		(substituted off) 62'
Replacements:
HK	16	Jordan Uelese		(substituted on) 62'
PR	17	Sekope Kepu		(substituted on) 62'
PR	18	Taniela Tupou		(substituted on) 51'
LK	19	Rory Arnold
FL	20	David Pocock		(substituted on) 51'
SH	21	Will Genia		(substituted on) 51'
CE	22	Samu Kerevi
WG	23	Adam Ashley-Cooper		(substituted on) 40'
Coach:
(Australia) Michael Cheika

FB	15	Rodrigo Silva	(substituted off) 64'
RW	14	Federico Favaro
OC	13	Tomás Inciarte
IC	12	Andrés Vilaseca (c)	(substituted off) 62'
LW	11	Nicolás Freitas
FH	10	Felipe Berchesi
SH	9	Agustín Ormaechea	(substituted off) 52'
N8	8	Manuel Diana
OF	7	Juan Diego Ormaechea	(substituted off) 55'
BF	6	Manuel Ardao
RL	5	Manuel Leindekar	(substituted off) 56'
LL	4	Franco Lamanna
TP	3	Diego Arbelo	(substituted off) 50'
HK	2	Germán Kessler	(substituted off) 70'
LP	1	Juan Echeverría	(substituted off) 73'
Replacements:
HK	16	Guillermo Pujadas	(substituted on) 70'
PR	17	Joaquín Jaunsolo	(substituted on) 73'
PR	18	Juan Rombys	(substituted on) 50'
LK	19	Ignacio Dotti	(substituted on) 56'
FL	20	Juan Manuel Gaminara	(substituted on) 55'
SH	21	Santiago Arata	(substituted on) 52'
FB	22	Felipe Echeverry	(substituted on) 64'
CE	23	Agustín Della Corte	(substituted on) 63'
Coach:
(Argentina) Esteban Meneses

Player of the Match:
Tevita Kuridrani (Australia)

Assistant referees:
Jérôme Garcès (France)
Karl Dickson (England)
Television match official:
Ben Skeen (New Zealand)

Notes:

- Jordan Petaia (Australia) made his international debut.
- Matt To'omua (Australia) earned his 50th test cap.

=== Wales vs Fiji ===
9 October 2019
18:45 JST (UTC+09)

(1 BP) Wales	29–17	Fiji
Try: Adams (3) 18' c, 31' c, 61' m L. Williams 69' c Con: Biggar (2/2) 20', 32'; Patchell (1/2) 70'; Pen: Patchell (1/1) 58'	Report	Try: Tuisova 4' m Murimurivalu 9' m Penalty try 54'

Oita Stadium, Ōita
Attendance: 33,379
Referee: Jérôme Garcès (France)

Wales	Fiji

FB	15	Liam Williams
RW	14	George North
OC	13	Jonathan Davies		(substituted off) 63'
IC	12	Hadleigh Parkes
LW	11	Josh Adams		(substituted off) 71'
FH	10	Dan Biggar		(substituted off) 56'
SH	9	Gareth Davies
N8	8	Ross Moriarty
OF	7	James Davies	(yellow card) 53'	(substituted off) 14'	(substituted on) 20'	(substituted off) 68'
BF	6	Josh Navidi
RL	5	Alun Wyn Jones (c)
LL	4	Jake Ball		(substituted off) 71'
TP	3	Tomas Francis		(substituted off) 71'
HK	2	Ken Owens	(yellow card) 8'			(substituted off) 68'
LP	1	Wyn Jones		(substituted off) 71'
Replacements:
HK	16	Elliot Dee		(substituted on) 14'	(substituted off) 20'	(substituted on) 68'
PR	17	Rhys Carré		(substituted on) 71'
PR	18	Dillon Lewis		(substituted on) 71'
FL	19	Aaron Shingler		(substituted on) 71'
FL	20	Aaron Wainwright				(substituted on) 68'
SH	21	Tomos Williams		(substituted on) 71'
FH	22	Rhys Patchell		(substituted on) 56'
CE	23	Owen Watkin		(substituted on) 63'
Coach:
(New Zealand) Warren Gatland

FB	15	Kini Murimurivalu
RW	14	Josua Tuisova
OC	13	Waisea Nayacalevu
IC	12	Levani Botia		(substituted off) 32'
LW	11	Semi Radradra
FH	10	Ben Volavola
SH	9	Frank Lomani		(substituted off) 68'
N8	8	Viliame Mata		(substituted off) 62'
OF	7	Semi Kunatani	(yellow card) 29'
BF	6	Dominiko Waqaniburotu (c)
RL	5	Leone Nakarawa
LL	4	Tevita Cavubati	(yellow card) 17'	(substituted off) 64'
TP	3	Manasa Saulo		(substituted off) 52'
HK	2	Sam Matavesi		(substituted off) 71'
LP	1	Campese Ma'afu		(substituted off) 40'
Replacements:
HK	16	Mesu Dolokoto		(substituted on) 71'
PR	17	Eroni Mawi		(substituted on) 40'
PR	18	Peni Ravai		(substituted on) 52'
LK	19	Api Ratuniyarawa		(substituted on) 64'
N8	20	Peceli Yato		(substituted on) 62'
SH	21	Nikola Matawalu		(substituted on) 68'
CE	22	Jale Vatubua		(substituted on) 32'
CE	23	Josh Matavesi
Coach:
(New Zealand) John McKee

Player of the Match:
Semi Radradra (Fiji)

Assistant referees:
Romain Poite (France)
Karl Dickson (England)
Television match official:
Ben Skeen (New Zealand)

Notes:

- Dominiko Waqaniburotu (Fiji) earned his 50th test cap.

=== Australia vs Georgia ===
11 October 2019
19:15 JST (UTC+09)

(1 BP) Australia	27–8	Georgia
Try: White 23' c Koroibete 60' c Dempsey 75' m Genia 79' m Con: To'omua (2/4) 24', 61'; Pen: To'omua (1/1) 37'	Report	Try: Todua 70' m Pen: Matiashvili (1/1) 28'

Shizuoka Stadium Ecopa, Fukuroi
Attendance: 39,802
Referee: Pascal Gaüzère (France)

Australia	Georgia

FB	15	Kurtley Beale		(substituted off) 14'
RW	14	Jordan Petaia		(substituted off) 58'
OC	13	James O'Connor
IC	12	Samu Kerevi
LW	11	Marika Koroibete
FH	10	Matt To'omua
SH	9	Nic White		(substituted off) 51'
N8	8	Isi Naisarani	(yellow card) 36'
OF	7	David Pocock (c)		(substituted off) 61'
BF	6	Jack Dempsey
RL	5	Rory Arnold		(substituted off) 58'
LL	4	Izack Rodda
TP	3	Sekope Kepu		(substituted off) 46'
HK	2	Tolu Latu		(substituted off) 66'
LP	1	Scott Sio		(substituted off) 58'
Replacements:
HK	16	Jordan Uelese		(substituted on) 66'
PR	17	James Slipper		(substituted on) 58'
PR	18	Taniela Tupou		(substituted on) 46'
LK	19	Rob Simmons		(substituted on) 58'
FL	20	Lukhan Salakaia-Loto		(substituted on) 61'
SH	21	Will Genia		(substituted on) 51'
FH	22	Christian Lealiifano		(substituted on) 58'
FB	23	Dane Haylett-Petty		(substituted on) 14'
Coach:
(Australia) Michael Cheika

FB	15	Soso Matiashvili
RW	14	Giorgi Kveseladze
OC	13	Davit Kacharava	(substituted off) 58'
IC	12	Merab Sharikadze (c)	(substituted off) 72'
LW	11	Alexander Todua
FH	10	Lasha Khmaladze
SH	9	Gela Aprasidze	(substituted off) 51'
N8	8	Beka Gorgadze	(substituted off) 58'
OF	7	Mamuka Gorgodze
BF	6	Beka Saghinadze
RL	5	Konstantin Mikautadze
LL	4	Giorgi Nemsadze	(substituted off) 61'
TP	3	Beka Gigashvili	(substituted off) 51'
HK	2	Shalva Mamukashvili	(substituted off) 51'
LP	1	Mikheil Nariashvili	(substituted off) 51'
Replacements:
HK	16	Jaba Bregvadze	(substituted on) 51'
PR	17	Guram Gogichashvili	(substituted on) 51'
PR	18	Giorgi Melikidze	(substituted on) 51'
FL	19	Otar Giorgadze	(substituted on) 61'
FL	20	Giorgi Tkhilaishvili	(substituted on) 58'
SH	21	Vasil Lobzhanidze	(substituted on) 51'
FH	22	Lasha Malaguradze	(substituted on) 72'
CE	23	Tamaz Mchedlidze	(substituted on) 58'
Coach:
(New Zealand) Milton Haig

Player of the Match:
Izack Rodda (Australia)

Assistant referees:
Jérôme Garcès (France)
Shuhei Kubo (Japan)
Television match official:
Marius Jonker (South Africa)

Notes:

- This is the first meeting between the two nations.
- Rob Simmons (Australia) become the 11th player to earn his 100th test cap for his country.
- Mamuka Gorgodze (Georgia) played his last international game.

=== Wales vs Uruguay ===
13 October 2019
17:15 JST (UTC+09)

(1 BP) Wales	35–13	Uruguay
Try: Smith 17' c Adams 49' c Penalty try 66'; T. Williams 74' c G. Davies 80+5' c Con: Halfpenny (4/4) 18', 50', 75', 80+6'	Report	Try: Kessler 71' c Con: Berchesi (1/1) 72'; Pen: Berchesi (2/2) 22', 39'

Kumamoto Stadium, Kumamoto
Attendance: 27,317
Referee: Angus Gardner (Australia)

Wales	Uruguay

FB	15	Leigh Halfpenny
RW	14	Josh Adams	(substituted off) 70'
OC	13	Owen Watkin
IC	12	Hadleigh Parkes
LW	11	Hallam Amos
FH	10	Rhys Patchell
SH	9	Aled Davies	(substituted off) 60'
N8	8	Aaron Wainwright	(substituted off) 59'
OF	7	Justin Tipuric (c)	(substituted off) 59'
BF	6	Aaron Shingler
RL	5	Adam Beard
LL	4	Bradley Davies
TP	3	Dillon Lewis	(substituted off) 64'
HK	2	Ryan Elias	(substituted off) 52'
LP	1	Nicky Smith	(substituted off) 52'
Replacements:
HK	16	Elliot Dee	(substituted on) 52'
PR	17	Rhys Carré	(substituted on) 52'
PR	18	Wyn Jones	(substituted on) 54'
LK	19	Jake Ball
N8	20	Ross Moriarty	(substituted on) 59'
FL	21	James Davies	(substituted on) 59'
SH	22	Tomos Williams	(substituted on) 60'
SH	23	Gareth Davies	(substituted on) 70'
Coach:
(New Zealand) Warren Gatland

FB	15	Gastón Mieres		(substituted off) 64'
RW	14	Leandro Leivas			(substituted off) 78'
OC	13	Juan Manuel Cat		(substituted off) 74'	(substituted on) 78'
IC	12	Andrés Vilaseca
LW	11	Nicolás Freitas
FH	10	Felipe Berchesi
SH	9	Santiago Arata		(substituted off) 58'
N8	8	Alejandro Nieto		(substituted off) 58'
OF	7	Santiago Civetta	(yellow card) 65'
BF	6	Juan Manuel Gaminara (c)
RL	5	Manuel Leindekar
LL	4	Ignacio Dotti		(substituted off) 58'
TP	3	Diego Arbelo		(substituted off) 52'
HK	2	Germán Kessler		(substituted off) 76'
LP	1	Mateo Sanguinetti		(substituted off) 51'
Replacements:
HK	16	Guillermo Pujadas		(substituted on) 76'
PR	17	Juan Echeverría		(substituted on) 51'
PR	18	Juan Rombys		(substituted on) 52'
LK	19	Diego Magno		(substituted on) 58'
FL	20	Manuel Diana		(substituted on) 58'
SH	21	Agustín Ormaechea		(substituted on) 58'
CE	22	Tomás Inciarte		(substituted on) 73'
FB	23	Rodrigo Silva		(substituted on) 64'
Coach:
(Argentina) Esteban Meneses

Player of the Match:
Leigh Halfpenny (Wales)

Assistant referees:
Luke Pearce (England)
Karl Dickson (England)
Television match official:
Rowan Kitt (England)

Notes:

- Ignacio Dotti (Uruguay) earned his 50th test cap.
- With this win, Wales topped their pool for the first time since 1999 and won all four of their pool matches for their first time since the pools were expanded to five teams in 2003.
