= 2014 IRB Tbilisi Cup =

- Date: 14 – 22 June 2014
- Countries: Argentina XV; Emerging Italy; Georgia; Spain

Tournament statistics
- Matches played: 6
- Attendance: 0 (0 per match)
- Tries scored: 12 (2 per match)
- Top point scorers: Juan Pablo Socino (Argentina Jaguars); 15 points
- Top try scorers: 12 players 1 try
- Official website: Official website

The 2014 IRB Tbilisi Cup was the second edition of this international rugby union tournament, created by the International Rugby Board. It was played from 14 to 22 June 2014 at the Avchala Stadium in Tbilisi.

The hosts Georgia were joined by Spain and two teams that regularly take part in the IRB Nations Cup, Argentina Jaguars and Emerging Italy.

South Africa President's XV won the inaugural tournament in 2013 after winning all three of their games but did not return to defend their title.

== Table ==
	Team	Played	Won	Drawn	Lost	Points For	Points Against	Points Diff	Tries For	Tries Against	Try Bonus	Losing Bonus	Points
1	Argentina XV	3	3	0	0	112	43	+69	?	?	1	0	13
2	Georgia	3	2	0	1	73	49	+24	?	?	1	0	9
3	Emerging Italy	3	1	0	2	67	79	–12	?	?	0	0	4
4	Spain	3	0	0	3	20	101	–81	?	?	0	0	0
Points breakdown: *4 points for a win *2 points for a draw *1 bonus point for a loss by seven points or less *1 bonus point for scoring four or more tries in a match Pre-tournament rankings are in parentheses. Updated: 15 June 2014

== Fixtures ==
The fixtures and kick off times were announced on 4 April 2014.

=== Matchday 1 ===
14 June 2014
17:00 GET (UTC+4)

Georgia	23–13	Spain
Try: T. Mtchedlidze 22' m Mamukashvili 33' c Todua 38' m Con: Tsiklauri (1/3); Pen: Tsiklauri (2) 16', 80'	Report	Try: Newton 30' c Con: Snee (1/1); Pen: García (2) 53', 75'

Avchala Stadium, Tbilisi
Attendance: 2,000
Referee: Andrew McMeneny (Scotland)

FB	15	Beka Tsiklauri
RW	14	Tamaz Mtchedlidze
OC	13	Davit Katcharava
IC	12	Revaz Gigauri
LW	11	Alexander Todua
FH	10	Lasha Malaghuradze
SH	9	Giorgi Begadze	(substituted off) 67'
N8	8	Dimitri Basilaia
OF	7	Giorgi Tkhilaishvili	(substituted off) 61'
BF	6	Shalva Sutiashvili (c)	(substituted off) 75'
RL	5	Kote Mikuatadze
LL	4	Giorgi Nemsadze	(substituted off) 61'
TP	3	Davit Kubriashvili
HK	2	Shalva Mamukashvili	(substituted off) 49'
LP	1	Zurab Zhvania	(substituted off) 61'
Replacements:
HK	16	Simon Maisuradze	(substituted on) 49'
PR	17	Giorgi Mtchedlishvili	(substituted on) 61'
LL	18	Lasha Lomidze	(substituted on) 61'
OF	19	Givi Berishvili	(substituted on) 61'
SH	20	Giorgi Rokhvadze	(substituted on) 67'
WG	21	Irakli Qiasashvili
BF	22	Muraz Giorgadze	(substituted on) 75'
Coach:
(New Zealand) Milton Haig

FB	15	Javier Carrión	(substituted off) 72'
RW	14	Alberto Díaz	(substituted off) 51'
OC	13	Ignacio Gutiérrez	(substituted off) 40'
IC	12	Daniel Snee
LW	11	Sergio Fernández
FH	10	Mariano García
SH	9	Facundo Munilla
N8	8	Jaime Nava (c)	(substituted off) 13'
OF	7	Adam Newton
BF	6	Manuel Mora
RL	5	Víctor Sánchez	(substituted off) 60'
LL	4	Alejandro Blanco
TP	3	Jesús Moreno	(substituted off) 51'
HK	2	Juan Anaya
LP	1	Francisco Javier Sanz	(substituted off) 45'
Replacements:
LP	16	Agustín Ortiz	(substituted on) 45'
RL	17	Romain Asensi	(substituted on) 60'
TP	18	Guillermo Espinos	(substituted on) 51'
N8	19	José Luis del Valle	(substituted on) 13'
FB	20	Francisco Cloppet	(substituted on) 72'
OC	21	Alejandro Gutiérrez	(substituted on) 40'
RW	22	Pablo Fontes	(substituted on) 51'
Coach:
(Spain) Santiago Santos

Touch judges:
Shota Tevzadze (Georgia)
Tornike Gvirjishvili (Georgia)

14 June 2014
19:00 GET (UTC+4)

Emerging Italy	20–45	Argentina XV
Try: Ragusi 25' c Visentin 78' c Con: Padovani (1/1); Violi (1/1); Pen: Padovani (2) 16', 42'	Report	Try: Brex 43' c Poet 47' c Penalty Try 54' c Moyano 63' m Taboada 69' m Masera 80' m Con: Socino (3); Pen: Socino (3) 19', 30', 38'

Avchala Stadium, Tbilisi
Referee: Dudley Phillips (IRFU)

=== Matchday 2 ===
18 June 2014
17:00 GET (UTC+4)

Georgia	16–26	Argentina XV

Avchala Stadium, Tbilisi

18 June 2014
19:00 GET (UTC+4)

Emerging Italy	37–0	Spain

Avchala Stadium, Tbilisi

=== Matchday 3 ===
22 June 2014
17:00 GET (UTC+4)

Georgia	34–10	Emerging Italy

Avchala Stadium, Tbilisi

22 June 2014
19:00 GET (UTC+4)

Argentina XV	41–7	Spain

Avchala Stadium, Tbilisi

== See also ==
- 2014 IRB Nations Cup
- 2014 IRB Pacific Nations Cup
