= Gorgodze =

Gorgodze is a Georgian surname (Georgian: გორგოძე). Notable people with the surname include:

- Ekaterine Gorgodze (born 1991), Georgian tennis player
- Mamuka Gorgodze (born 1984), Georgian rugby union player
