= Tsageri Central Stadium =

Football stadium located in the town of Tsageri, Lechkhumi, Georgia

- tsageri stadium
- Interactive map of Tsageri Central Stadium
- Location: Tsageri, Georgia
- Coordinates: 42°38′36.8″N 42°46′14.2″E
- Owner: Tsageri Municipality
- Operator: Tsageri Municipality
- Capacity: 300
- Surface: Artificial turf
- Field size: 105 m × 68 m (344 ft × 223 ft)

Construction
- Opened: uknown
- Renovated: 2026

Tsageri Central Stadium (Georgian: ცაგერის ცენტრალური სტადიონი) is a football stadium located in the town of Tsageri, Lechkhumi, Georgia. It serves as the primary football venue in the municipality.

== History and redevelopment ==
For decades, the stadium hosted local football matches and youth training programs.

In 2026, the Municipal Development Fund of Georgia under the Ministry of Infrastructure initiated a major redevelopment project to construct a new football technical center and a modernized stadium in Tsageri. The project includes installing an artificial turf pitch, stands with a seating capacity of 300 spectators, locker rooms, and supporting sports infrastructure.

== Naming ==
In October and November 2026, the Tsageri Municipality Assembly (Sakrebulo) initiated administrative proceedings to officially name the stadium after Giorgi Nemsadze, a former captain of the Georgia national football team and former mayor of Tsageri Municipality.
