= Jack Ram =

Tongan rugby union player

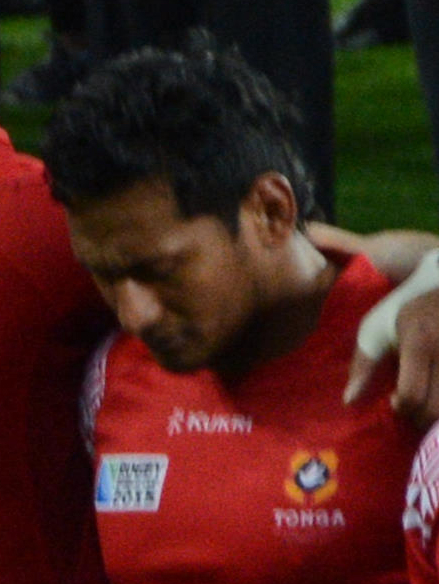
- Born: Jack Dehei Ram; January 14, 1987 (age 39) Sydney, New South Wales, Australia
- Height: 1.89 m (6 ft 2 1/2 in)
- Weight: 105 kg (16 st 7 lb; 231 lb)
- School: Lavengamalie Christian College
- University: Lavengamalie Christian University

Rugby union career
- Position: Flanker
Provincial / State sides
Years	Team	Apps	(Points)
2012–2016	Northland	28	(15)
2017–2018	Doncaster Knights	22	(25)
2017	Northland	10	(20)
2018–2020	Coventry	27	(5)
2020–2021	New England Free Jacks	-	(-)
2021–2025	Stade Nantais	-	(-)
- Correct as of 12 July 2025
Super Rugby
Years	Team	Apps	(Points)
2015−2016	Blues	2	(0)
- Correct as of 20 July 2016
International career
Years	Team	Apps	(Points)
2015	Tonga A	3	(0)
2015–2017	Tonga	13	(15)
- Correct as of 21 January 2021
National sevens team
Years	Team		Comps
2009–2015	Tonga Sevens		4
- Correct as of 30 September 2015

Jack Ram (born 14 January 1987) is a Tongan professional rugby union footballer.

He represented the Tonga sevens team and Tonga national rugby teams between 2009 and 2015.

== Early life ==
Ram's father, Samuel Santa Ram is a Indo-Fijian and is from Tavua. His mother is a Tongan who his father met and married in Australia. Ram was born in Australia, his parents moved to Tonga when he was 3 to start a business there. He plays club rugby for Lavengamalie Rugby Club. He represented the Tongan under-19 team in 2006.

== Career ==
He joined Lavengamalie Rugby Club in 2005. In 2009, he played in the Pacific Rugby Cup for Tautahi Gold. In the same year, he was recruited into the Tonga sevens team. One of his biggest victory came in 2012 when he scored a try to help Tonga 7's beat the Fiji sevens side for the first time in history at the 2012 Wellington Sevens. He joined the Kerikeri rugby club in 2011. He represented Northland in the 2012 ITM Cup. A bad knee injury sidelined him for most of the 2013 ITM Cup.

In September 2014, an outstanding performance and his 2 tries helped Northland defeat Otago in the 2014 ITM Cup.

In June 2015, after the Blues suffered multiple injuries, Ram was called onto the bench for their final 2015 Super Rugby pool game against the Highlanders.

In December 2017, Ram signed for English club Doncaster Knights in the RFU Championship during the remainder of the 2017–18 season. On 12 April 2018, Ram signed for Championship rivals Coventry ahead of the 2018–19 season.

On 18 August 2020, Ram travels to USA to join New England Free Jacks in the Major League Rugby competition ahead of the 2020–21 season.

== International career ==
He made his international debut for Tonga in the 2015 World Rugby Pacific Nations Cup against the United States in Toronto. He was then included in the Tongan team to the 2015 Rugby World Cup. He came off the bench against Georgia to replace the injured captain, Nili Latu. He started against Namibia 10 days later scoring two-tries and setting up another for winger, Telusa Veainu. He was awarded the Man of the Match in that game.
