= Tomás Cubelli =

Argentine rugby union player (born 1989)

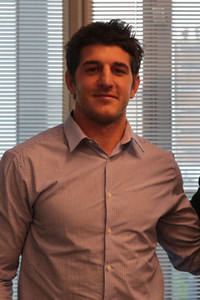
- Cubelli during a private outing
- Full name: Tomás Maria Cubelli
- Born: 12 June 1989 (age 37) Buenos Aires, Argentina
- Height: 1.75 m (5 ft 9 in)
- Weight: 79 kg (174 lb; 12 st 6 lb)

Rugby union career
- Position: Scrum-half
Senior career
Years	Team	Apps	(Points)
2010–2018	Belgrano	31	(75)
2011–2015	Pampas XV	24	(35)
2016–2017	ACT Brumbies	18	(15)
2019–2020	Jaguares	20	(15)
2021	Western Force	12	(10)
2021–2023	Biarritz	18	(25)
2024–2025	Miami Sharks	24	(15)
- Correct as of 15 June 2025
International career
Years	Team	Apps	(Points)
2008	Argentina U19	3	(0)
2009	Argentina U20	3	(5)
2010–2012	Argentina XV	6	(5)
2010–2023	Argentina	91	(80)
- Correct as of 27 October 2023

Tomás Maria Cubelli (born 12 June 1989) is an Argentine former professional rugby union player who played as a scrum-half. He last played in Major League Rugby for the Miami Sharks. He earned over 90 Test caps for the Argentina national team.

== Club career ==
Cubelli began his career with Belgrano Athletic Club, a rugby club based in Belgrano, Buenos Aires, the same club his father, Alejandro, played for.

After the introduction of an Argentinian team into South Africa's Vodacom Cup in 2010, Cubelli joined the team that would be eventual champions in 2011. Cubelli played seven games for Pampas XV scoring one try in the process during their undefeated campaign in the 2011 Vodacom Cup. Pampas XV defeated the Blue Bulls 14–9 in the final in the North West province at Olën Park, Potchefstroom. In 2012, Cubelli played all seven of the seven games Pampas XV competed in during the 2012 Vodacom Cup, scoring two tries. In 2013, however, Cubelli scored three tries in only eight games including one in the Quarter-finals against the Pumas. Pampas XV lost 44–37.

In November 2015, after current Brumbies and Australia national team scrum-half Nic White left the club for French Top 14 club Montpellier, the Brumbies, an Australian, Canberra-based Super Rugby franchise, signed Cubelli on a two-year deal as his replacement.

Cubelli was a significant part of the Brumbies squad during 2016, his first Super Rugby season. And earned high praise from coach Stephen Larkham, who described the Argentinean as the best running scrum-half in Brumbies history. Cubelli made his debut in round 1 of the 2016 season against the Hurricanes, scoring a try and helping the team to a 52–10 victory at GIO Stadium, Canberra. Cubelli's second try of the season came in round 11 against the Bulls of Pretoria. The Brumbies won 23–6 at home. Cubelli scored his third and final try of the 2016 season against Australian Super Rugby conference rivals, the Queensland Reds in round 15 at home once again, and put the scoreline to 34–17 and eventually help the Brumbies to win the match 43–24.

After a very successful debut season in 2016, Cubelli's 2017 season was much less memorable, having only played three matches the entire season in part due to a knee injury he suffered during pre-season. round 16 against the Reds, round 17 against the Chiefs and the Qualifying final against the Hurricanes.

After being injured during 2017 and not playing many minutes throughout the Brumbies' campaign, Cubelli subsequently left the club for his native Argentina for the following season, signing a contract until the end of 2019.

In October 2020, Cubelli was signed by Australian Super Rugby side Western Force to play in the 2021 Super Rugby AU season and Super Rugby Trans-Tasman.

In June 2026, Cubelli announced his retirement from professional rugby.

== International career ==
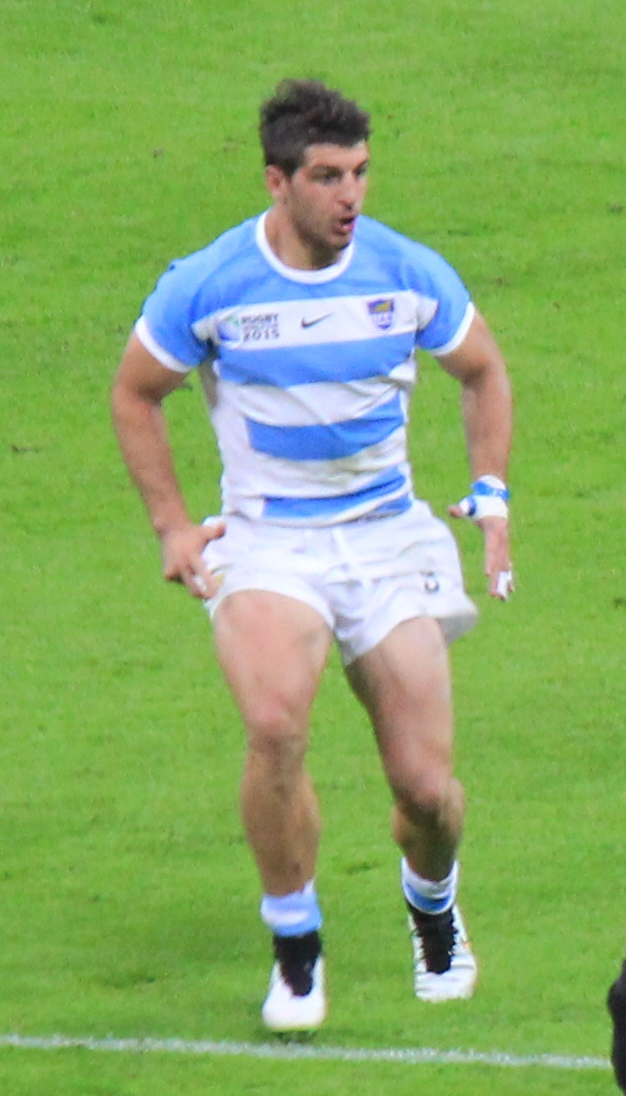
Cubelli playing against New Zealand in Pool C of the 2015 Rugby World Cup

Cubelli made his international debut against Uruguay during the 2010 South American Rugby Championship in Santiago, Chile.

Cubelli was a part of the fourth placed Argentina team at the 2015 Rugby World Cup. An important player for Argentina during the 2015 Rugby World Cup, he was second choice scrum-half for most of the tournament behind Martín Landajo, however, Cubelli started in three of the seven games for Argentina, against New Zealand, against Georgia in which cubelli scored a try, and one in the third place match against South Africa in which they were defeated 24–13 at the Olympic Stadium, London. Cubelli scored two tries in the Pool stages, but unfortunately he could not help Argentina to a place above third.

Cubelli was a starter for the Argentina national team on 14 November 2020 in their first ever win against the All Blacks.

== Career statistics ==
=== Club summary ===
As of July 21, 2018

Season	Team	Games	Starts	Sub	Mins	Tries	Cons	Pens	Drops	Points	Yel	Red
2016	Brumbies	15	14	1	987	3	0	0	0	15	1	0
2017	Brumbies	3	0	3	103	0	0	0	0	0	1	0
2018	Jaguares	0	0	0	0	0	0	0	0	0	0	0
Total		18	14	4	1,090	3	0	0	0	15	2	0
