= Giorgi Aptsiauri =

Georgian rugby union player

- Born: 20 November 1994 (age 31) Tbilisi, Georgia
- Height: 178 cm (5 ft 10 in)
- Weight: 89 kg (14 st 0 lb; 196 lb)

Rugby union career
- Position(s): Wing, Fullback
Senior career
Years	Team	Apps	(Points)
- AIA Kutaisi
- Correct as of 4 September 2015
International career
Years	Team	Apps	(Points)
2014–	Georgia	22	(5)
- Correct as of 26 November 2016

Giorgi Aptsiauri (born November 20, 1994) is a Georgian rugby union player. His position is fullback or winger and he currently plays for AIA Kutaisi in the Georgia Championship and the Georgia national team.
