= Vasil Lobzhanidze =

Georgia international rugby union player

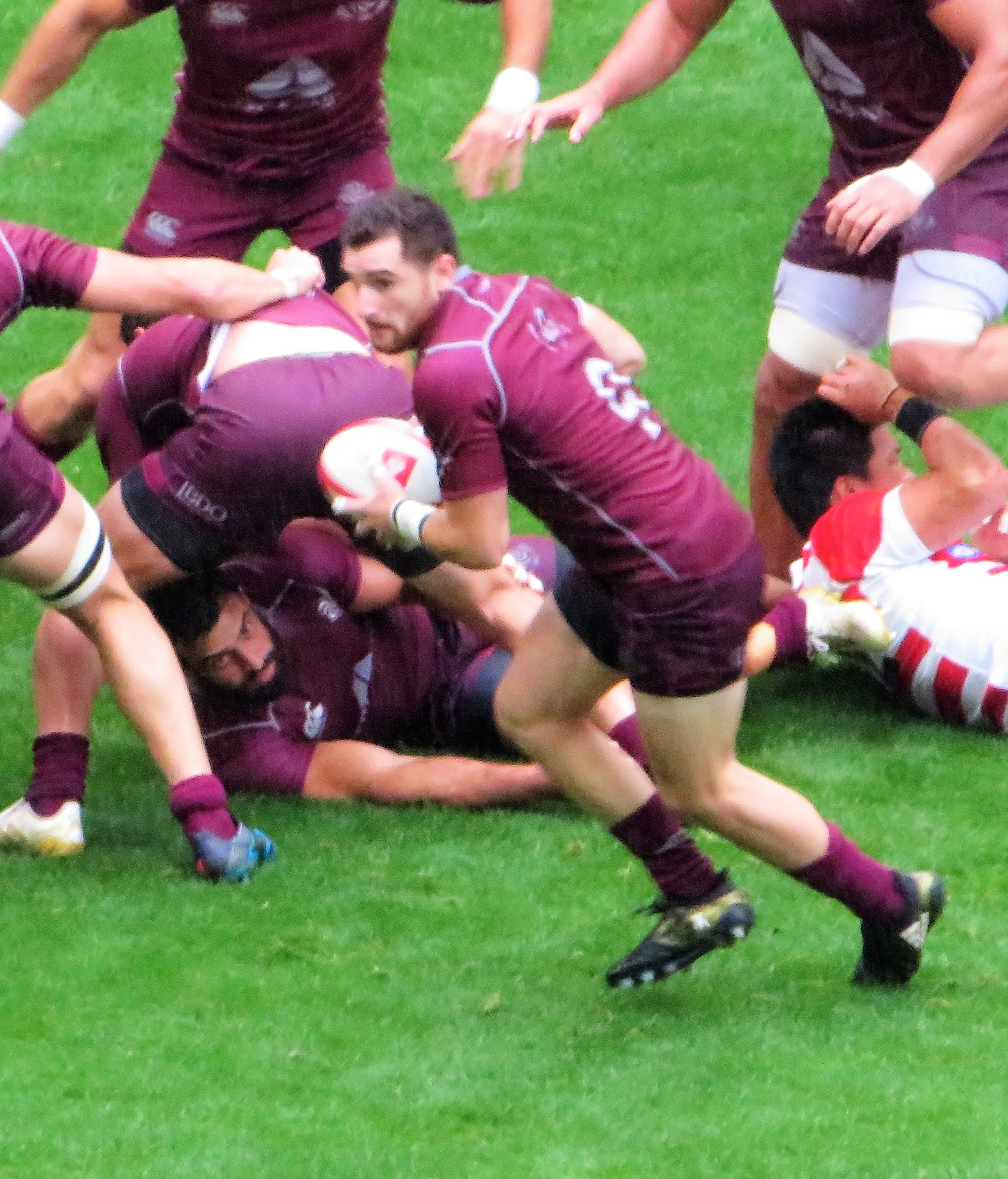
- Born: 14 October 1996 (age 30) Tbilisi, Georgia
- Height: 1.76 m (5 ft 9 in)
- Weight: 76 kg (12 st 0 lb; 168 lb)

Rugby union career
- Position: Scrum-half
Senior career
Years	Team	Apps	(Points)
2014–2016	Armazi	33	(25)
2016–2023	CA Brive	112	(50)
2024	RC Toulon	7	(0)
2024-	Oyonnax	6	(0)
- Correct as of 3 July 2024
International career
Years	Team	Apps	(Points)
2015–2016	Georgia U20	12	(15)
2015-	Georgia	100	(78)
- Correct as of 3 July 2024

Vasil Lobzhanidze (Georgian: ვასილ ლობჟანიძე; born 14 October 1996) is a Georgian rugby union player. His position is scrum-half, and he currently plays for Oyonnax in the Pro D2 and the Georgia national team.

== Career ==
Vasil Lobzhanidze started playing rugby union in Tbilisi, with the RC Armazi club. At the age of 18, he was spotted by Georgia coach Milton Haig, who decided to start him against Germany on 15 February 2015. After a good performance, he played all the matches of the 2015 edition of the European Nations Championship, including three as a starter.

In May of that same year, Vasil Lobzhanidze won the World Rugby U20 Trophy with the Georgian under-20 team and qualified for the 2016 junior world championship. Lobzhanidze was named to the Georgia squad for the 2015 Rugby World Cup, and in Georgia's opening match against Tonga became the youngest player ever to appear in a World Cup match. On 1 February 2020, aged 23 years and 110 days, he broke George North’s record to become the youngest player ever to reach 50 Test caps.

On 18 December 2015, Lobzhanidze signed his first full professional contract with top French club CA Brive in the Top 14 from the 2016–17 season. On March 1, 2021, he extended his contract with CA Brive until 2024.

At the end of December 2023, it was announced that he was released by Brive and immediately signed with RC Toulon as a medical joker following the long-term absence of Baptiste Serin. Following the latter's return from injury, he joined Oyonnax Rugby in April as Tony Ensor's medical joker for the end of the season and for a two-year contract thereafter.
