= Muraz Giorgadze =

- Born: 28 June 1994 (age 32) Tbilisi, Georgia
- Height: 1.83 m (6 ft 0 in)
- Weight: 86 kg (13 st 8 lb; 190 lb)

Rugby union career
- Position: Wing,
Senior career
Years	Team	Apps	(Points)
2014-	Armazi	46	(45)
- Correct as of 4 September 2015
International career
Years	Team	Apps	(Points)
2015–	Georgia	9	(10)
- Correct as of 2 October 2015

Muraz Giorgadze (born June 28, 1994) is a Georgian Rugby Union player. His position is wing and he plays for Armazi in the Georgia Championship and the Georgia national team.
