= Mikheil Nariashvili =

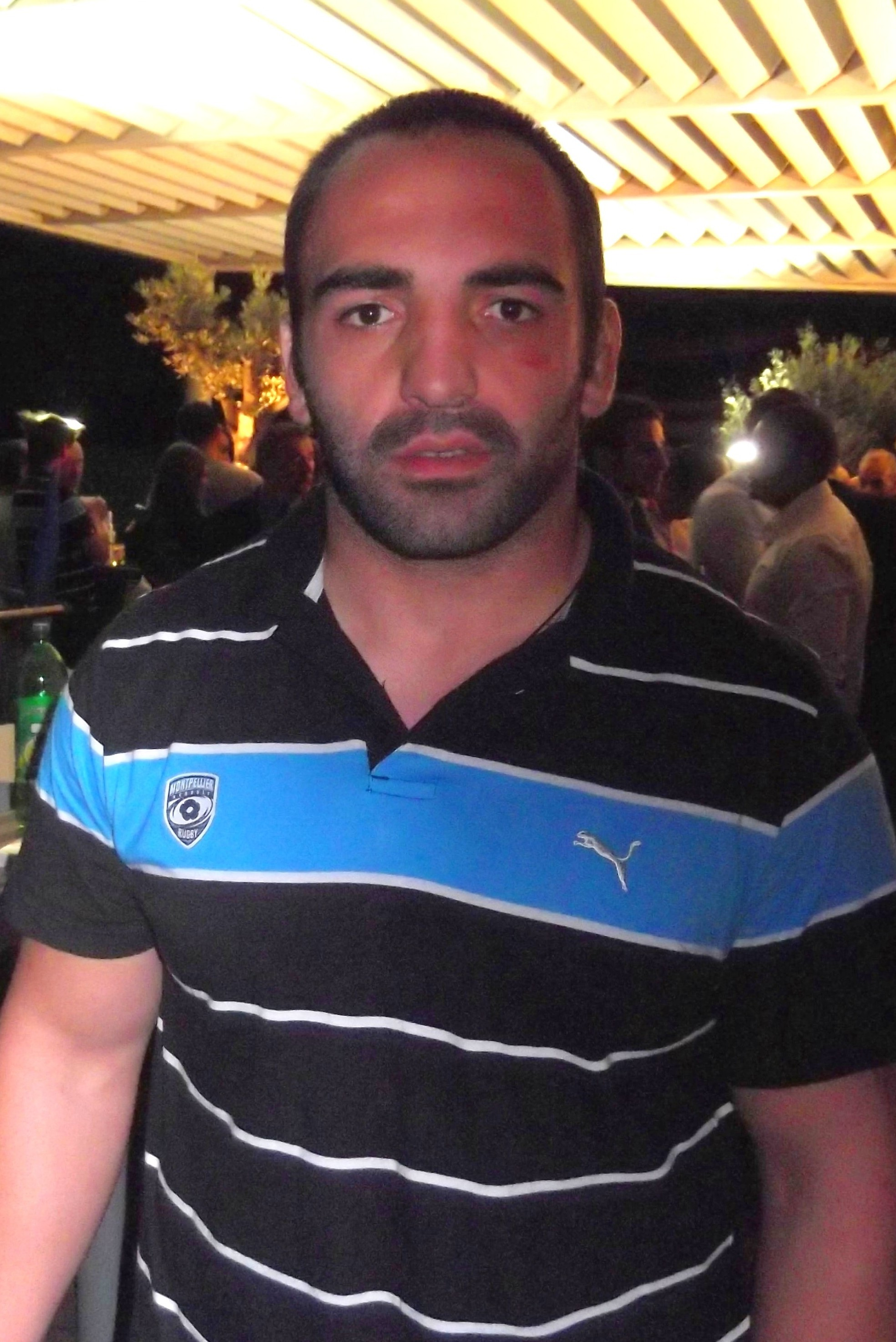
- Born: Mikheil Nariashvili; 25 May 1990 (age 36) Kutaisi, Georgia
- Height: 1.85 m (6 ft 1 in)
- Weight: 118 kg (18 st 8 lb; 260 lb)

Rugby union career
- Position: Loosehead prop
Senior career
| Years | Team | Apps | (Points) |
| 2010–2022 | Montpellier | 200 | (5) |
| 2023– | Black Lion | | |
- Correct as of 30 October 2021
International career
| Years | Team | Apps | (Points) |
| 2012– | Georgia | 56 | (5) |
- Correct as of 16 September 2019

Mikheil Nariashvili (born 25 May 1990 in Kutaisi, Georgia) is a rugby union player who currently plays for Montpellier in the Top 14 and also plays internationally for Georgia as a prop.

== Honours ==
- 2015–16 European Rugby Challenge Cup : winner.
