= Davit Kacharava =

Georgian rugby union player

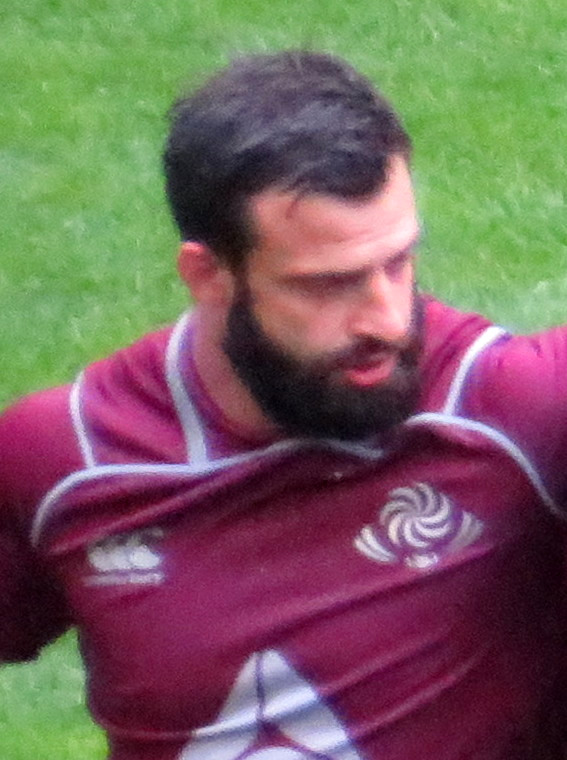
- Kacharava in 2018
- Born: 16 January 1985 (age 41) Tbilisi, Georgian SSR, Soviet Union
- Height: 1.85 m (6 ft 1 in)
- Weight: 100 kg (15 st 10 lb; 220 lb)

Rugby union career
- Position: Centre
Senior career
Years	Team	Apps	(Points)
2009–2012	Nice	42	(15)
2012–2013	Rodez	12	(0)
2013–2020	Enisei-STM	67	(25)
International career
Years	Team	Apps	(Points)
2006–2020	Georgia	122	(125)

Davit Kacharava (Georgian: დავით კაჭარავა; born 16 January 1985, in Tbilisi) is a Georgian rugby union player who plays as a centre.

He played for Bastia, Nice, from 2009/10 to 2011/12, for Stade Rodez Aveyronin the Fédérale 1 in France, during the 2012/13 season, and currently plays for Enisei-STM in the Russian Championship. His club played in the European Rugby Challenge Cup.

He has 73 caps for Georgia, since 2006, with 14 tries scored, 70 points on aggregate. He was called for the 2007 Rugby World Cup, playing in two games and scoring a try, and for the 2011 Rugby World Cup, playing in all the four games but without scoring. He continues to be a regular player for the Georgian side.

He is member of Parliament of Georgia since December 2020. On 2 August 2022, Kacharava left the Georgian Dream party and joined the People's Power party.
