= Mamuka Gorgodze =

Georgian rugby union player

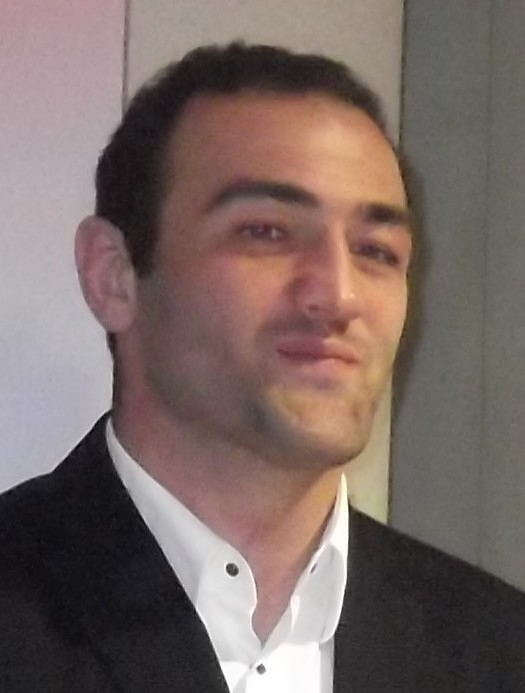
- Gorgodze at a Press Conference
- Born: 14 July 1984 (age 42) Tbilisi, Georgia
- Height: 1.96 m (6 ft 5 in)
- Weight: 118 kg (260 lb; 18 st 8 lb)

Rugby union career
- Position(s): Flanker, Lock, Number 8
Senior career
Years	Team	Apps	(Points)
-2005	Lelo Saracens		
2005–2014	Montpellier	168	(135)
2014–2019	Toulon	102	(85)
- Correct as of 24 June 2016
International career
Years	Team	Apps	(Points)
2003–2019	Georgia	75	(135)
- Correct as of 23 September 2019

Mamuka Gorgodze (Georgian: მამუკა გორგოძე) (born 14 July 1984) is a Georgian former rugby union player, who played in the top French professional rugby competition, the Top 14. He played for Toulon, having signed with the club in 2014 after having played for Montpellier since 2005. His usual position is flanker or number eight, but he played his early career as a lock. Gorgodze played for the Georgia national rugby union team in 71 matches, including 13 as a captain. He appeared for the Georgia national team in three World Cups in 2007, 2011, and 2015. In May 2017, he announced his retirement from the national team. In 2019 he returned to the national team for the World Cup in Japan.

Gorgodze is nicknamed "Gorgodzilla" by his former Montpellier teammates, and "Gulliver" by Georgian fans. Both stem from his imposing size and rampaging style of play.

== Playing career ==
=== Early career ===
Gorgodze switched to rugby from basketball aged 17. His first club was Lelo in the Georgian Top League, he was soon selected for the Georgia national team and made his debut in 2003 against Spain, at the age of just 18 and not long after he started playing rugby. However he wasn't selected for Georgia's first appearance at the 2003 Rugby World Cup later that year. In 2004 he became a regular fixture for the Georgia side.

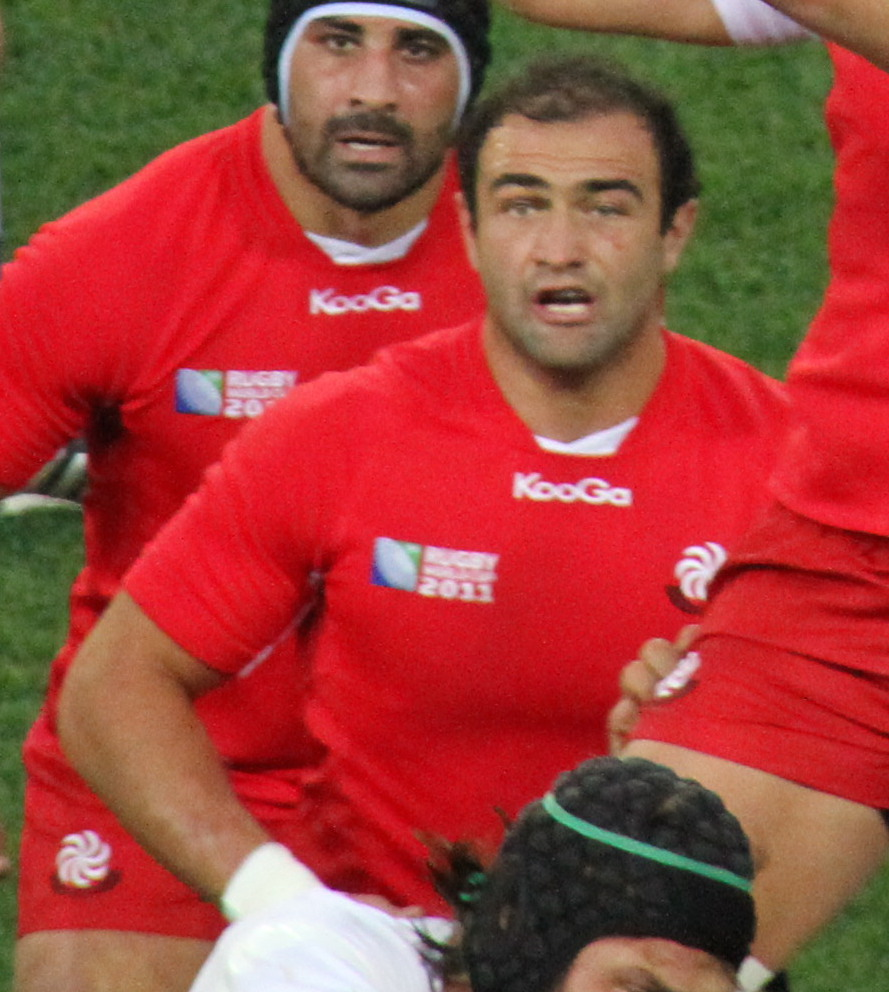
Mamuka Gorgodze at RWC 2011

=== Montpellier ===
Gorgodze signed for Montpellier in 2005. Gorgodze started his career at Montpellier mainly as a reserve in the side and didn't get much game time. He was still a regular in the Georgia side though and was selected for the 2007 Rugby World Cup. Gorgodze started three of Georgia's four matches at the World Cup, and was one of Georgia's star players.

After the 2007 Rugby World Cup, Gorgodze started playing for Montpellier a lot more regularly and was their first choice lock. Gorgodze was signed by Brive for the 2009/10 season but Gorgodze changed his mind and decided to stay at Montpellier, who were forced to pay Brive 200,000 euros to keep him.

A known weak spot for Gorgodze is his indiscipline, he has received 16 yellow cards for Montpellier since 2007. During 2010 he was banned twice for fighting, once with Sébastien Pagès against Albi and the other time with Alex Tulou against Bourgoin.

Gorgodze changed position for Georgia to the back row, and when Fabien Galthié and Eric Béchu became the new Montpellier coaches before the 2010/11 season they also converted him to the back row. Gorgodze became a revelation at flanker during this season, and halfway through the season French newspaper L'Équipe commented that he improved his technique and became a mobile and unstoppable player. Gorgodze played a big role in Montpellier finishing the 2010/11 Top 14 as runners up, and had a particularly massive match in the Top 14 semi final against Racing-Métro. At the end of the season L'Équipe named him as the best foreigner in the league.

Gorgodze was selected for the Georgia squad for the 2011 Rugby World Cup and played all the Georgia matches and was named man of the match in two matches, against England and Romania.

Gorgodze had signed a preliminary contract with Toulon in advance of the 2011–12 season, but changed his mind and signed an extension to his deal with Montpellier. This led to a tribunal hearing, but an amicable settlement was soon reached.

=== Toulon ===
In November 2013, as his contract with Montpellier was expiring, he signed a three-year deal with Toulon to take effect with the 2014–15 season. His competitive debut with Toulon was delayed due to a knee injury during a preseason friendly with Racing Métro; and missed the start of the 2014–15 season. With the expiry of his contract in May 2020, Gorgodze retired from professional rugby at the age of 35. His last Toulon appearance was a pre-pandemic Top 14 game against Pau in November 2019.
