= Shalva Sutiashvili =

Georgia international rugby union player

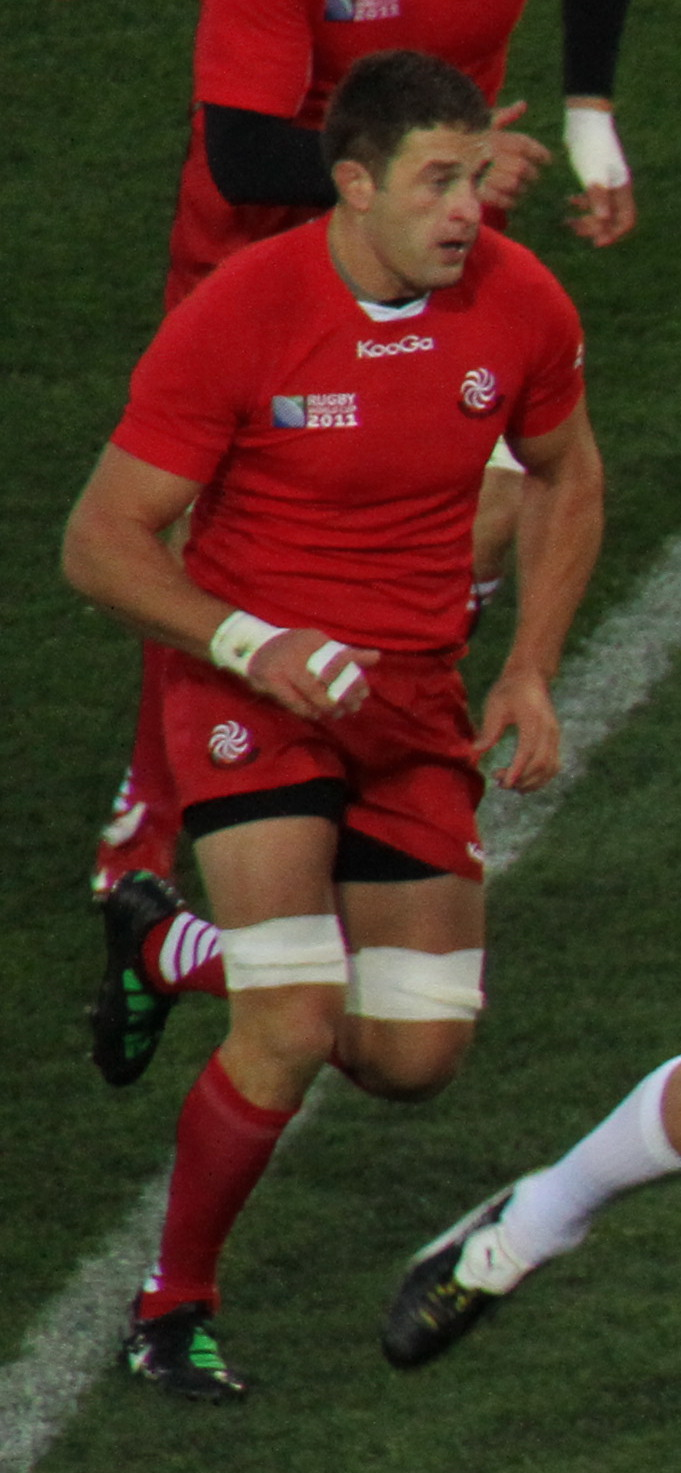
- Born: 24 January 1984 (age 42) Tbilisi, Georgian SSR, Soviet Union
- Height: 1.93 m (6 ft 4 in)
- Weight: 110 kg (17 st 5 lb; 243 lb)

Rugby union career
- Position: Flanker
Senior career
| Years | Team | Apps | (Points) |
| 2007–2008 | Bobigny | 9 | (10) |
| 2011–2015 | RC Massy | 126 | (85) |
- Correct as of 4 September 2015
International career
| Years | Team | Apps | (Points) |
| 2006– | Georgia | 77 | (10) |
- Correct as of 16 September 2019

Shalva Sutiashvili (geo: შალვა სუთიაშვილი; born Tbilisi, 24 January 1984) is a Georgian rugby union player who plays as a flanker.

He played for XV Charente, in France, in the Pro D2 for the 2014/15 season, and for Soyaux-Angoulême, in France, in the Fédérale 1 for the 2015/2016 season.

He has 72 caps for Georgia, with 2 tries scored, 10 points on aggregate. He had his first game at 12 November 2005, in the 29–6 win over Chile, in Tbilisi, for the Intercontinental Cup. He was 21 years old. He missed the 2007 Rugby World Cup but would be called for the 2011 Rugby World Cup and 2015 Rugby World Cup, he played 5 games in the world cup. He is a regular player for the Georgia side that qualified for the 2015 Rugby World Cup.

He played as captain against Spain on 27 February 2016.

He was the 15th captain on the Georgian national team. When he was captain, the team never lost.
