= Giorgi Nemsadze =

Georgia international rugby union player

- Born: 26 September 1984 (age 42) Kutaisi, Georgian SSR, Soviet Union
- Height: 1.96 m (6 ft 5 in)
- Weight: 115 kg (18 st 2 lb; 254 lb)

Rugby union career
- Position: Lock
Senior career
Years	Team	Apps	(Points)
2007-2009	Domont	31	(20)
2009-2010	Massy	15	(20)
2010-2011	Montauban	13	(5)
2011-2012	Agen	14	(10)
2012-2016	Tarbes	68	(25)
2016-2018	Bristol Rugby	10	(5)
2018-2019	Ospreys	5	(0)
- Correct as of 21 August 2019
International career
Years	Team	Apps	(Points)
2005-2019	Georgia	92	(75)
- Correct as of 16 September 2019

Giorgi Nemsadze (Georgian: გიორგი ნემსაძე) is a Georgian rugby union player who plays as a lock and flanker for the Georgia national rugby union team.
