= 2025–26 Rugby Europe International Championships =

- Date: 27 September 2025 – 24 May 2026
- Countries: 35

Tournament statistics
- Champions: Championship; Portugal (2); Trophy; Czech Republic (1); Conference; Luxembourg (2); Austria (1); Ukraine (3); Malta (6); Bosnia and Herzegovina (1)
- Antim Cup: Georgia (20th title)
- Matches played: 66
- Attendance: 77,420 (1,173 per match)
- Tries scored: 838 (12.7 per match)

The 2025–26 Rugby Europe International Championships is the European Championship for tier 2 and tier 3 rugby union nations.

== Countries ==
Pre-tournament World Rugby rankings in parentheses.

Championship
Group A

- Georgia * (13)
- Netherlands (26)
- Spain (15)
- Switzerland (28)

Group B

- Belgium (21)
- Germany (35)
- Portugal (20)
- Romania (22)

Trophy

- Croatia (41)
- Czech Republic (33)
- Denmark ↑ (60)
- Lithuania (55)
- Poland (30)
- Sweden (31)

Conference

Pool A

- Estonia (NR)
- Finland (75)
- Latvia (63)
- Luxembourg ↓ (56)
- Norway (100)

Pool D

- Andorra (84)
- Cyprus (NR)
- Israel (57)
- Malta • (51)

Pool B

- Austria (73)
- Hungary (82)
- Serbia (72)
- Slovakia (NR)
- Slovenia • (81)

Pool E

- Bosnia and Herzegovina (94)
- Kosovo (NR)
- Montenegro (NR)

Pool C

- Bulgaria (70)
- Moldova • (59)
- Ukraine • (52)
- Turkey (85)

Legend:
* Champion of 2024–25 season; ↑ Promoted from lower division during 2024–25 season; • Division Champion but not promoted during 2024–25 season; ‡ Last place inside own division but not relegated during 2024–25; ↓ Relegated from higher division during 2024–25 season

== 2026 Rugby Europe Championship ==
=== Pool A ===
Pos	Team	Pld	W	D	L	PF	PA	PD	TF	TA	TB	LB	Pts	Qualification
1	Georgia	3	3	0	0	157	45	+112	23	5	3	0	15	Grand Finals Semi-Finals
2	Spain	3	2	0	1	134	89	+45	20	13	2	0	10	Grand Finals Semi-Finals
3	Switzerland	3	1	0	2	46	130	−84	6	19	0	0	4	Ranking Finals Semi-Finals
4	Netherlands	3	0	0	3	68	141	−73	9	21	0	1	1	Ranking Finals Semi-Finals

Source: Rugby Europe
Rules for classification:
If two teams have the same number of points the best ranked will be: 1) match points in the games played between the tied Unions; 2) tries in the games played between the tied Unions; 3) match points difference in all pool games; 4) tries difference for in all pool games; 5) match points for in all pool games.
If three or more teams have same number of points, the best ranked will be: 1) match points difference in all pool games; 2) tries for in all pool games; 4) match points for in all pool games.
Points were awarded to the teams as follows: Win – 4 points, Draw – 2 points, At least 3 more tries than opponent – 1 point, Loss within 7 points – 1 point

=== Pool B ===
Pos	Team	Pld	W	D	L	PF	PA	PD	TF	TA	TB	LB	Pts	Qualification
1	Portugal	3	3	0	0	159	36	+123	22	5	3	0	15	Grand Finals Semi-Finals
2	Romania	3	1	0	2	54	80	−26	6	11	0	1	5	Grand Finals Semi-Finals
3	Belgium	3	1	0	2	41	73	−32	5	7	1	0	5	Ranking Finals Semi-Finals
4	Germany	3	1	0	2	45	110	−65	6	16	0	0	4	Ranking Finals Semi-Finals

Source: Rugby Europe
Rules for classification:
If two teams have the same number of points the best ranked will be: 1) competition points; 2) match points difference; 3) match tries difference; 3) match points difference in all pool games; 4) tries for in all pool games; 5) match points for in all pool games.
If three or more teams have same number of points, the best ranked will be: 1) competition points; 2) tries for in all pool games; 3) match points for in all pool games.
Points were awarded to the teams as follows: Win – 4 points, Draw – 2 points, At least 3 more tries than opponent – 1 point, Loss within 7 points – 1 point

Matches
Group Stage

7 February 2026
13:00 CET (UTC+1)

Netherlands	33–51	Spain (1 TBP)
	Report

NRCA Stadium, Amsterdam
Attendance: 2,000
Referee: (Italy) Filipo Russo

7 February 2026
20:00 CET (UTC+1)

Belgium	17–47	Portugal (1 TBP)
	Report

Stade Charles Tondreau, Mons
Attendance: 5,000
Referee: (France) Jérémy Rozier

8 February 2026
13:00 CET (UTC+1)

Switzerland	3–54	Georgia (1 TBP)
	Report

Stade Municipal, Yverdon-les-Bains
Attendance: 2,200
Referee: (Romania) Alex Ionescu

8 February 2026
16:00 CET (UTC+1)

Germany	30–24	Romania (1 LBP)
	Report

Auestadion, Kassel
Attendance: 1,600
Referee: (Georgia (country)) Saba Makharadze

14 February 2026
13:00 CET (UTC+1)

Germany	12–68	Portugal (1 TBP)
	Report

Paul Greifzu Stadium, Dessau-Roßlau
Attendance: 3,400
Referee: (Italy) Alberto Favaro

14 February 2026
20:00 CET (UTC+1)

(1 TBP) Spain	53–14	Switzerland
	Report

Estadio Nueva Balastera, Palencia
Attendance: 1,715
Referee: (Netherlands) Edwin Van Der Spek

15 February 2026
13:00 CET (UTC+1)

Netherlands	12–61	Georgia (1 TBP)
	Report

NRCA Stadium, Amsterdam
Attendance: 2,000
Referee: (Ireland) Max Weston

15 February 2026
19:00 EET (UTC+2)

Romania	23–6	Belgium
	Report

Stadionul Arcul de Triumf, Bucharest
Attendance: n/a
Referee: (Georgia (country)) Saba Abulashvili

21 February 2026
15:00 GET (UTC+4)

(1 TBP) Georgia	42–30	Spain
	Report

Avchala Stadium, Tbilisi
Attendance: 2,965
Referee: (Scotland) Sam Grove-White

21 February 2026
20:00 CET (UTC+1)

(1 TBP) Belgium	18–3	Germany
	Report

Stade Charles Tondreau, Mons
Attendance: 3,000
Referee: (Georgia (country)) Shota Tevzadze

22 February 2026
13:00 CET (UTC+1)

Switzerland	29–23	Netherlands (1 LBP)
	Report

Stade Municipal, Yverdon-les-Bains
Attendance: 1,800
Referee: (Portugal) Diogo Miranda

22 February 2026
17:30 WET (UTC+0)

(1 TBP) Portugal	44–7	Romania
	Report

Estádio Nacional, Oeiras
Attendance: 3,000
Referee: (France) Kevin Bralley

Ranking Finals

=== Semi-Finals ===
7 March 2026
13:00 CET (UTC+1)

Switzerland	35–25	Germany
	Report

Stade Municipal, Yverdon-les-Bains
Attendance: 1,500
Referee: (Wales) Sion Carwin

7 March 2026
20:00 CET (UTC+1)

Belgium	38–15	Netherlands
	Report

Sportcomplex Sint-Gillis, Dendermonde
Attendance: 700
Referee: (Portugal) Diogo Inacio

=== Seventh Place Final ===
15 March 2026
11:00 CET (UTC+1)

Germany	7–76	Netherlands
	Report

Estadio Nacional Complutense, Madrid
Attendance: 1,600
Referee: (Georgia (country)) Saba Makharadze

=== Fifth Place Final ===
15 March 2026
13:30 CET (UTC+1)

Switzerland	16–39	Belgium
	Report

Estadio Nacional Complutense, Madrid
Attendance: 1,600
Referee: (Spain) Eki Fanlo

Grand Finals

=== Semi-Finals ===
8 March 2026
15:00 GET (UTC+4)

Georgia	53–30	Romania
	Report

Avchala Stadium, Tbilisi
Attendance: 3,000
Referee: (Italy) Alberto Favaro

8 March 2026
15:00 WET (UTC+0)

Portugal	26–7	Spain
	Report

Estádio do Restelo, Lisbon
Attendance: 4,700
Referee: (Ireland) Keane Davison

=== Bronze Final ===
15 March 2026
16:00 CET (UTC+2)

Romania	23–29	Spain
	Report

Butarque Stadium, Leganés
Attendance: 6,000
Referee: (Italy) Filippo Russo

=== Cup Final ===
15 March 2026
18:45 CET (UTC+2)

Georgia	17–19	Portugal
	Report

Butarque Stadium, Leganés
Attendance: 6,000
Referee: (France) Jérémy Rozier

== 2025–26 Rugby Europe Trophy ==
Champions
Relegated to Rugby Europe Conference

Pos	Team	Pld	W	D	L	PF	PA	PD	TF	TA	TB	LB	Pts
1	Czech Republic	5	5	0	0	305	111	+194	43	15	3	0	23
2	Poland	5	4	0	1	263	45	+218	38	5	4	1	21
3	Sweden	5	3	0	2	148	167	−19	23	24	2	0	14
4	Lithuania	5	1	0	4	97	212	−115	13	31	1	1	6
5	Denmark	5	1	0	4	121	233	−112	19	32	0	1	5
6	Croatia	5	1	0	4	92	258	−166	14	39	0	0	4

Source: Rugby Europe
Rules for classification:
If two teams have the same number of points the best ranked will be: 1) match points in the games played between the tied Unions; 2) tries in the games played between the tied Unions; 3) match points difference in all pool games; 4) tries difference for in all pool games; 5) match points for in all pool games.
If three or more teams have same number of points, the best ranked will be: 1) match points difference in all pool games; 2) tries for in all pool games; 4) match points for in all pool games.
Points were awarded to the teams as follows: Win – 4 points, Draw – 2 points, At least 3 more tries than opponent – 1 point, Loss within 7 points – 1 point

Matches

25 October 2025
14:00 EEST (UTC+3)

Lithuania	8–41	Poland (1 TBP)
	Report

Rugby Stadium Gardino, Siauliai
Attendance: 300
Referee: (Spain) Alberto Diaz

25 October 2025
14:00 CEST (UTC+2)

(1 TBP) Sweden	57–12	Croatia
	Report

Trelleborg Rugby Arena,
Attendance: 250
Referee: (Poland) Adrian Pawlik

31 October 2025
20:00 CET (UTC+1)

Croatia	36–26	Denmark
	Report

Gradski Sportski Centar, Makarska
Attendance: 250
Referee: (Belgium) Adele Robert

1 November 2025
14:00 CET (UTC+1)

(1 TBP) Sweden	38–3	Lithuania
	Report

Trelleborg Rugby Arena, Trelleborg
Attendance: 300
Referee: (Georgia (country)) Papuna Chiqaberidze

8 November 2025
14:00 CET (UTC+1)

Croatia	33–55	Czech Republic
	Report

Stadion Stari plac, Split
Attendance: 400
Referee: (Netherlands) Liam Wright

8 November 2025
16:00 CET (UTC+1)

(1 TBP) Poland	47–6	Denmark
	Report

Municipal Stadium, Siedlce
Attendance: 2,500
Referee: (Sweden) Monray Gilbert

15 November 2025
14:00 CET (UTC+1)

Denmark	38–34	Lithuania (1 LBP)
	Report

Aalborg Rugbyklub, Aalborg
Attendance: 300
Referee: (Poland) Dominik Jastrzebski

15 November 2025
20:15 CET (UTC+1)

(1 TBP) Czech Republic	48–24	Sweden
	Report

Marketa Stadium, Prague
Attendance: 1,000
Referee: (Germany) Maria Latos

22 November 2025
13:00 CET (UTC+1)

(1 LBP) Poland	30–32	Czech Republic
	Report

Narodowy Stadion Rugby, Gdynia
Attendance: 2,300
Referee: (Romania) Andrei Gheorghe

28 February 2026
13:00 CET (UTC+1)

(1 TBP) Czech Republic	87–5	Lithuania
	Report

Marketa Stadium, Prague
Attendance: 1,000
Referee: (Croatia) Ivan Zelic

28 February 2026
14:00 CET (UTC+1)

Croatia	3-73	Poland (1 TBP)
	Report

Gradski Sportski Centar, Makarska
Attendance: 200
Referee: (Portugal) Diogo Inacio

4 April 2026
14:00 CEST (UTC+2)

Sweden	33–32	Denmark (1 LBP)
	Report

Trelleborg Rugby Arena
Attendance: 600
Referee: (Portugal) Marco Minelli

11 April 2026
14:00 CEST (UTC+2)

Denmark	19–83	Czech Republic (1 TBP)
	Report

Erritsø Rugbystation, Fredericia
Attendance: 450
Referee: (Germany) Paul Warman

11 April 2026
17:00 CEST (UTC+2)

(1 TBP) Poland	72–3	Sweden
	Report

Narodowy Stadion Rugby, Gdynia
Attendance: 2,430
Referee: (Scotland) Ruairidh Cambell

18 April 2026
14:00 EEST (UTC+3)

(1 TBP) Lithuania	47–8	Croatia
	Report

Rugby Stadium Gardino, Siauliai
Attendance: 500
Referee: (Germany) Benedikt Niklas

== 2025–26 Rugby Europe Conference ==
=== Pool A ===
Champions

Pos	Team	Pld	W	D	L	PF	PA	PD	TF	TA	TB	LB	Pts
1	Luxembourg	4	4	0	0	203	23	+180	28	1	3	0	19
2	Finland	4	2	1	1	131	51	+80	17	10	1	1	12
3	Latvia	4	1	1	2	73	77	−4	11	3	1	0	7
4	Norway	4	1	0	3	79	157	−78	11	32	1	0	5
5	Estonia	4	1	0	3	28	206	−178	0	33	1	0	5

Source: Rugby Europe
Rules for classification:
If two teams have the same number of points the best ranked will be:1) match points in the games played between the tied Unions; 2) tries in the games played between the tied Unions; 3) match points difference in all pool games; 4) tries difference for in all pool games; 5) match points for in all pool games.
If three or more teams have same number of points, the best ranked will be: 1) match points difference in all pool games; 2) tries for in all pool games; 4) match points for in all pool games.
Points were awarded to the teams as follows: Win – 4 points, Draw – 2 points, At least 3 more tries than opponent – 1 point, Loss within 7 points – 1 point

Matches

18 October 2025
14:00 CEST (UTC+2)

Norway	6–60	Luxembourg (1 TBP)
	Report

International School of Stavanger, Stavanger
Attendance: 100
Referee: (Netherlands) Bram Oudman

18 October 2025
15:00 EEST (UTC+3)

Finland (1 TBP)	62–0	Estonia
	Report

Ruutisavu Areena, Helsinki
Attendance: 150
Referee: (Switzerland) James Thomas

25 October 2025
15:00 EEST (UTC+3)

Finland	14–14	Latvia
	Report

Myllypuro Sports Park, Helsinki
Attendance: 100
Referee: (Belgium) Diego Grippa

1 November 2025
14:00 EET (UTC+2)

Latvia	59–7	Norway
	Report

Jana Dalina stadionas, Valmiera
Attendance: 200
Referee: (Croatia) Ivan Zelic

6 December 2025
15:00 CET (UTC+1)

Luxembourg	93–0	Estonia
	Report

Stade de Luxembourg, Luxembourg City
Attendance: 500
Referee: (Austria) Philip Manolopoulos

11 April 2026
15:00 EEST (UTC+3)

Latvia	0–28 (Note: Latvia forfeited the fixture due to critical funding situation)	Estonia (1 TBP)
	n/a

Jānis Daliņš Stadium, Valmiera
Referee: n/a

18 April 2026
16:00 CEST (UTC+2)

(1 TBP) Luxembourg	28–0	Latvia
	n/a

Stade de Luxembourg, Luxembourg City
Referee: n/a

18 April 2026
14:00 CEST (UTC+2)

Norway	15–38	Finland
	Report

International School of Stavanger Stadium, Stavanger
Attendance: n/a
Referee: (Ukraine) Borys Bovsunovskyi

2 May 2026
14:00 EEST (UTC+3)

Estonia	0–51	Norway (1 TBP)
	Report

Kalevi Keskstaadion, Tallinn
Attendance: 200
Referee: (Croatia) Luka Leroti

9 May 2026
15:00 EEST (UTC+3)

(1 LBP) Finland	17–22	Luxembourg
	Report

Ruutisavu Areena, Helsinki
Attendance: 150
Referee: (Sweden) Monray Gilbert

=== Pool B ===
Champions

Pos	Team	Pld	W	D	L	PF	PA	PD	TF	TA	TB	LB	Pts	Qualification or relegation
1	Austria	4	4	0	0	249	46	+203	37	6	3	0	19	Advanced to Promotion play-off
2	Serbia	4	3	0	1	175	91	+84	25	12	3	0	15	
3	Slovenia	4	2	0	2	104	149	−45	15	23	1	0	9	
4	Hungary	4	1	0	3	96	183	−87	10	27	1	1	6	
5	Slovakia	4	0	0	4	32	187	−155	4	24	0	0	0	

Source: Rugby Europe
Rules for classification:
If two teams have the same number of points the best ranked will be: 1) match points in the games played between the tied Unions; 2) tries in the games played between the tied Unions; 3) match points difference in all pool games; 4) tries difference for in all pool games; 5) match points for in all pool games.
If three or more teams have same number of points, the best ranked will be: 1) match points difference in all pool games; 2) tries for in all pool games; 4) match points for in all pool games.
Points were awarded to the teams as follows: Win – 4 points, Draw – 2 points, At least 3 more tries than opponent – 1 point, Loss within 7 points – 1 point

Matches

4 October 2025
14:00 CEST (UTC+2)

(1 TBP) Austria	62–7	Slovenia
	Report

Sepp-Doll-Stadion, Krems an der Donau
Attendance: 250
Referee: (Switzerland) Samuel Grando

4 October 2025
14:00 CEST (UTC+2)

Hungary	26–59	Serbia (1 TBP)
	Report

Rugby Club Hotel, Esztergom
Attendance: 350
Referee: (Poland) Mieszko Lech

11 October 2025
14:00 CEST (UTC+2)

Slovenia	38–35	Hungary (1 LBP)
	Report

Oval Stadium, Ljubljana
Attendance: 300
Referee: (Sweden) Monray Gilbert

25 October 2025
13:00 CEST (UTC+2)

(1 TBP) Serbia	52–12	Slovakia
	Report

Pančevo City Stadium, Pančevo
Attendance: n/a
Referee: (Latvia) Vadims Galajevs

8 November 2025
14:00 CEST (UTC+2)

Slovakia	3–62	Austria (1 TBP)
	Report

Štadión PFK, Piešťany
Attendance: 100
Referee: (Switzerland) Arnaud Kooger

4 April 2026
14:00 CEST (UTC+2)

Hungary	7–86	Austria (1 TBP)
	Report

Budapest Rugby Center, Budapest
Attendance: 250
Referee: (Ukraine) Vlad Inlitskyi

18 April 2026
n/a

Slovakia	0–28 (Note: Slovakia forfeited the fixture)	Hungary (1 TBP)
	n/a

n/a
Referee: n/a

18 April 2026
14:00 CEST (UTC+2)

(1 TBP) Serbia	35–14	Slovenia
	report

Wiselj Park Stadium, Belgrade
Attendance: 300
Referee: (Austria) Filippos Manolopoulos

25 April 2026
14:00 CEST (UTC+2)

(1 TBP) Slovenia	45–17	Slovakia
	Report

Oval Stadium, Llubljana
Attendance: 150
Referee: (Moldova) Anatolie Tipa

9 May 2026
17:00 CEST (UTC+2)

Austria	39–29	Serbia
	Report

Wiener Sport-Club Stadium, Vienna
Attendance: 2,000
Referee: (Moldova) Valeriu Chipercean

=== Pool C ===
Champions

Pos	Team	Pld	W	D	L	PF	PA	PD	TF	TA	TB	LB	Pts
1	Ukraine	3	3	0	0	120	21	+99	16	3	2	0	14
2	Moldova	3	2	0	1	58	61	−3	6	0	0	0	8
3	Bulgaria	3	1	0	2	39	86	−47	4	10	0	1	5
4	Turkey	3	0	0	3	27	76	−49	3	11	0	1	1

Source: Rugby Europe
Rules for classification:
If two teams have the same number of points the best ranked will be: 1) match points in the games played between the tied Unions; 2) tries in the games played between the tied Unions; 3) match points difference in all pool games; 4) tries difference for in all pool games; 5) match points for in all pool games.
If three or more teams have same number of points, the best ranked will be: 1) match points difference in all pool games; 2) tries for in all pool games; 4) match points for in all pool games.
Points were awarded to the teams as follows: Win – 4 points, Draw – 2 points, At least 3 more tries than opponent – 1 point, Loss within 7 points – 1 point

Matches

27 September 2025
14:00 TRT UTC+3)

Turkey	6–41	Ukraine (1 TBP)
	Report

Ataturk Olimpiyat Stadium, Istanbul
Attendance: 200
Referee: (Germany) Julian Noster

4 October 2025
15:00 EEST (UTC+3)

Bulgaria	16–14	Turkey (1 LBP)
	Report

Vasil Levski National Stadium, Sofia
Attendance: n/a
Referee: (Moldova) Valeriu Chipercean

4 April 2026
14:00 EEST (UTC+3)

Moldova	17–7	Turkey
	Report

Dinamo Stadium, Chișinău
Attendance: 850
Referee: (Georgia (country)) Shota Tsagareishvili

11 April 2026
14:00 EEST (UTC+3)

Ukraine	31–15	Moldova
	Report

Dinamo Stadium, Chișinău
Attendance: 100
Referee: (Latvia) Vadims Galajevs

18 April 2026
12:00 EEST (UTC+3)

(1 TBP) Ukraine	46–0	Bulgaria
	Report

Dinamo Stadium, Chișinău
Attendance: 100
Referee: (Moldova) Victor Lungu

25 April 2026
15:00 EEST (UTC+3)

(1 LBP) Bulgaria	23–26	Moldova
	Report

Vasil Levski National Stadium, Sofia
Attendance: 500
Referee: (Germany) Julian Noster

=== Pool D ===
Champions

Pos	Team	Pld	W	D	L	PF	PA	PD	TF	TA	TB	LB	Pts	Qualification or relegation
1	Malta	3	3	0	0	121	57	+64	17	7	3	0	15	Advanced to Promotion play-off
2	Andorra	2	1	0	1	45	54	−9	5	7	0	0	4	
3	Israel	2	0	0	2	35	71	−36	4	9	0	0	0	
4	Cyprus	1	0	0	1	8	27	−19	1	4	0	0	0	

Source: Rugby Europe
Rules for classification:
If two teams have the same number of points the best ranked will be: 1) match points in the games played between the tied Unions; 2) tries in the games played between the tied Unions; 3) match points difference in all pool games; 4) tries difference for in all pool games; 5) match points for in all pool games.
If three or more teams have same number of points, the best ranked will be: 1) match points difference in all pool games; 2) tries for in all pool games; 4) match points for in all pool games.
Points were awarded to the teams as follows: Win – 4 points, Draw – 2 points, At least 3 more tries than opponent – 1 point, Loss within 7 points – 1 point

Matches

8 November 2025
17:00 CET (UTC +1)

Andorra	21–10	Israel
	Report

Estadi Nacional, Andorra la Vella
Attendance: 300
Referee: (Portugal) Marco Minelli

15 November 2025
14:00 EET (UTC+2)

Cyprus	8–27	Malta (1 TBP)
	Report

Tsirio Stadium, Limassol
Attendance: n/a
Referee: (Spain) Inaki Munoz-Martin

4 April 2026
17:00 CEST (UTC+2)

Andorra	24–44	Malta (1 TBP)
	Report

Estadi Nacional, Andorra la Vella
Attendance: 300
Referee: (Romania) Andrei Ballok

11 April 2026
14:00 CEST (UTC+2)

(1 TBP) Malta	50–25	Israel
	Report

Tony Bezzina Stadium, Paola
Attendance: n/a
Referee: (Monaco) Thomas Semin

22 April 2026
TBA

Cyprus	Cancelled	Andorra

Tsirio Stadium, Limassol
Referee: TBA

9 May 2026
TBA

Israel	Cancelled	Cyprus

TBA
Referee: TBA

=== Pool E ===
Champions

Pos	Team	Pld	W	D	L	PF	PA	PD	TF	TA	TB	LB	Pts
1	Bosnia and Herzegovina	2	2	0	0	131	15	+116	19	2	2	0	10
2	Montenegro	2	1	0	1	111	61	+50	15	10	1	0	5
3	Kosovo	2	0	0	2	5	171	−166	1	24	0	0	0

Source: Rugby Europe
Rules for classification:
If two teams have the same number of points the best ranked will be: 1) match points in the games played between the tied Unions; 2) tries in the games played between the tied Unions; 3) match points difference in all pool games; 4) tries difference for in all pool games; 5) match points for in all pool games.
If three or more teams have same number of points, the best ranked will be: 1) match points difference in all pool games; 2) tries for in all pool games; 4) match points for in all pool games.
Points were awarded to the teams as follows: Win – 4 points, Draw – 2 points, At least 3 more tries than opponent – 1 point, Loss within 7 points – 1 point

Matches

4 October 2025
14:00 CEST (UTC+2)

(1 TBP) Bosnia and Herzegovina	61–10	Montenegro
	report

Kamberovica Polje Stadium, Zenica
Attendance: 150
Referee: (Belgium) Geoffrey Serralbo

18 April 2026
14:00 CEST (UTC+2)

Kosovo	5–70	Bosnia and Herzegovina (1 TBP)
	Report

Demush Mavraj Stadium, Istog
Attendance: 50
Referee: (Germany) Joshua Jahn

2 May 2026
11:00 CEST (UTC+2)

(1 TBP) Montenegro	101–0	Kosovo
	Report

Stadion Olympic, Ulcinj
Attendance: 150
Referee: (Belgium) Nathanael Legras

== Play-offs ==
=== Conference promotion to Trophy play-off ===
24 May 2026
18:00 CEST (UTC+2)

Malta	39–13	Austria
	Report

National Stadium, Ta' Qali
Attendance: 3,000
Referee: (Romania) Andrei Ballock
