= Ereklasse =

Highest tier of Dutch rugby union

- Sport: Rugby union
- Organising body: Dutch Rugby Union
- No. of teams: 12
- Country: Netherlands
- Most recent champion: Haagsche (2025–26)
- Most titles: Hilversum (19 titles)
- Broadcaster: Eyecons
- Level on pyramid: 1 (Note: Ereklasse is the highest-level of rugby union played exclusively in the Netherlands. However one team play in the trans-national Rugby Europe Super Cup, which is a professional competition.)
- Website: rugby.nl

The Ereklasse (English: Premier League) is a semi-professional rugby union competition in the Netherlands, organised by the Dutch Rugby Union (RN). It is the highest level of rugby in the country.

== Current Clubs ==
Locations of the 2025–26 Ereklasse clubs

Club	Established	Venue	Location
Amsterdamse Atletiek Club	1930; 96 years ago	NRCA Stadium	Amsterdam, North Holland
Bredase	1975; 51 years ago	Sportpark de Wisselaar	Breda, North Brabant
Castricumse	1968; 58 years ago	Sportpark Wouterland	Castricum, North Holland
DIOK Leiden	1971; 55 years ago	Rugbystadion Smaragdlaan	Leiden, South Holland
The Dukes	1974; 52 years ago	Rugbystadion Pettelaer	's-Hertogenbosch, North Brabant
Eemland	1977; 49 years ago	Sportpark de Bokkeduinen	Amersfoort, Utrecht
't Gooi	1933; 93 years ago	Sportpark Naarden	Naarden, North Holland
Haagsche	1932; 94 years ago	Rugbystadion Bouwmeesterlaan	The Hague, South Holland
Haarlem	1980; 46 years ago	Van der Aert Sportpark	Haarlem, North Holland
Hoek van Holland	1974; 52 years ago	Sportpark de Rondgang	Hook of Holland, South Holland
Oisterwijk Oysters	1976; 50 years ago	Sportpark de Wolfsputten	Oisterwijk, North Brabant
Rotterdamse	1940; 86 years ago	Sportpark Duivensteijn	Rotterdam, South Holland

== Head coaches champions ==
2025-2026 Hadley Jackson

2024-2025 Hadley Jackson

2023-2024 Gareth Gilbert

2022-2023 Zane Gardner

2021-2022 Maximiliano Machado

2018-2019 Andy Egonu

== Champions ==
- 2025-2026 Haagsche RC
- 2024-2025 Haagsche RC
- 2023-2024 RC t´Gooi
- 2022-2023 RC Eemland
- 2021-2022 LRC DIOK
- 2018-2019 LRC DIOK
- 2017-2018 RC 't Gooi
- 2016-2017 RC Hilversum
- 2015-2016 RC Hilversum
- 2014-2015 RC Hilversum
- 2013-2014 Haagsche RC
- 2012-2013 RC 't Gooi
- 2011-2012 RC Hilversum
- 2010-2011 RC Hilversum
- 2009-2010 RC Hilversum
- 2008-2009 RC 't Gooi
- 2007-2008 RC The Dukes
- 2006-2007 Castricumse RC
- 2005-2006 Castricumse RC
- 2004-2005 Castricumse RC
- 2003-2004 Castricumse RC
- 2002-2003 Castricumse RC
- 2001-2002 Haagsche RC
- 2000-2001 Haagsche RC
- 1999-2000 Castricumse RC
- 1998-1999 Haagsche RC
- 1997-1998 LRC DIOK
- 1996-1997 LRC DIOK
- 1995-1996 LRC DIOK
- 1994-1995 LRC DIOK
- 1993-1994 LRC DIOK
- 1992-1993 LRC DIOK
- 1991-1992 LRC DIOK
- 1990-1991 LRC DIOK
- 1989-1990 LRC DIOK
- 1988-1989 LRC DIOK
- 1987-1988 Castricumse RC
- 1986-1987 Castricumse RC
- 1985-1986 RC Hilversum
- 1984-1985 Haagsche RC
- 1983-1984 RC Hilversum
- 1982-1983 RC Hilversum
- 1981-1982 RC Hilversum
- 1980-1981 LRC DIOK
- 1979-1980 Haagsche RC
- 1978-1979 none because of the weather conditions on 16-03-1979
- 1977-1978 Haagsche RC
- 1976-1977 Amsterdamse AC
- 1975-1976 RC Hilversum
- 1974-1975 RC Hilversum
- 1973-1974 RC Hilversum
- 1972-1973 Haagsche RC
- 1971-1972 Haagsche RC
- 1970-1971 Haagsche RC
- 1969-1970 Haagsche RC
- 1968-1969 Amsterdamse AC
- 1967-1968 Haagsche RC
- 1966-1967 Haagsche RC
- 1965-1966 Haagsche RC
- 1964-1965 RC Hilversum
- 1963-1964 Amsterdamse AC
- 1962-1963 Te Werve RFC
- 1961-1962 RC Hilversum
- 1960-1961 Amsterdamse AC
- 1959-1960 RC Hilversum
- 1958-1959 RC Hilversum
- 1957-1958 RC Hilversum
- 1956-1957 RC Hilversum
- 1955-1956 Amsterdamse AC
- 1954-1955 Amsterdamse AC
- 1953-1954 Amsterdamse AC
- 1952-1953 DSR-C
- 1951-1952 RC 't Gooi
- 1950-1951 DSR-C
- 1949-1950 DSR-C
- 1948-1949 Amsterdamse AC
- 1947-1948 DSR-C
- 1946-1947 Rotterdamse RC
- 1945-1946 Amsterdamse AC
- 1944-1945 Amsterdamse AC
- 1943-1944 none
- 1942-1943 none
- 1941-1942 none
- 1940-1941 none
- 1939-1940 Amsterdamse AC
- 1938-1939 DSR-C
- 1937-1938 DSR-C
- 1936-1937 ARVC
- 1935-1936 ARVC

Total
Team	Wins
RC Hilversum	19
Haagsche RC	16
LRC DIOK	13
Amsterdamse AC	11
Castricumse RC	8
DSR-C	6
RC 't Gooi	4
ARVC	2
Rotterdamse RC	1
Te Werve RFC	1
RC The Dukes	1

== See also ==
- Rugby union in the Netherlands
