= Rugbyclub Wageningen =

Dutch rugby union club, based in Wageningen

Rugby Club Wageningen
- Full name: Rugby Club Wageningen
- Union: Dutch Rugby Union
- Founded: 7 May 1970; 55 years ago
- Location: Wageningen, the Netherlands
- Ground: Sportpark De Zoom
- Chairman: Evelien van der Wolf
- Coach: (Germany) Daniel Weber
- League: 3e klasse zuidoost
Team kit

Rugbyclub Wageningen, also known RC Wageningen, is a Dutch rugby club in Wageningen, in central Netherlands.

== History ==
The club was founded on 7 May 1970. At its first 5-year jubileum the first ever Dutch women's rugby match was organised in Wageningen.
