= 2026 Rugby Europe Championship =

- Date: 7 February – 15 March 2026
- Countries: Belgium; Georgia; Germany; Netherlands; Portugal; Romania; Spain; Switzerland

Tournament statistics
- Champions: Portugal (2nd title)
- Antim Cup: Georgia (20th title)
- Matches played: 20
- Attendance: 53,780 (2,689 per match)
- Tries scored: 152 (7.6 per match)
- Top point scorer(s): (Georgia (country)) Luka Matkava (49)
- Top try scorer(s): (Portugal) Rodrigo Marta (5)

The 2026 Rugby Europe Championship was the tenth Rugby Europe Championship, the annual rugby union competition for the top European national teams outside the Six Nations Championship, and the 55th edition of the competition including all its previous incarnations (as the FIRA Tournament, Rugby Union European Cup, FIRA Nations Cup, FIRA Trophy, and European Nations Cup).

Eight teams are taking part in the 2026 championship; Belgium, Georgia, Germany, the Netherlands, Portugal, Romania, Spain and Switzerland.

Georgia entered the tournament as defending champions. They won the final against Spain in the 2025 tournament, claiming their 17th title. The serpentine system was applied to allocate each team to their respective groups. Each team play a total of five games (three round robin group matches to determine the team's path and two play-off matches). Seeding (for a group) and relegation are calculated over a two-year cycle, as is the promotion from the Trophy competition.

All matches on the final day will be staged in Spain. The fifth and seventh place playoffs were hosted at Estadio Nacional Complutense in Madrid, with the third place playoff and final hosted at the Butarque Stadium in Leganés.

== Participants ==
Nation	Stadium			Head coach	Captain
Nation	Home stadium	Capacity	Location	Head coach	Captain
Belgium	Stade Charles Tondreau; Province Naimette Arena	8,000; 5,000	Mons; Liège	(France) Laurent Dossat	Jens Torfs
Georgia	Avchala Stadium	3,500	Tbilisi	(Italy) Marco Bortolami (interim)	Vasil Lobzhanidze
Germany	Fritz-Grunebaum-Sportpark; Paul Greifzu Stadium	5,000; 20,000	Heidelberg; Dessau-Roßlau	(Germany) Mark Kuhlmann	Justin Renc
Netherlands	NRCA Stadium	7,000	Amsterdam	(Scotland) Bryan Easson	Mees Voets
Portugal	Estádio Nacional; Estádio do Restelo	37,593; 19,856	Oeiras; Lisbon	(New Zealand) Simon Mannix	Tomás Appleton
Romania	Emil Alexandrescu Stadium	11,390	Iași	(France) David Gérard	Ovidiu Cojocaru
Spain	Estadio Nueva Balastera; Estadio Nacional Complutense; Butarque Stadium	8,100; 6,000; 14,500	Palencia; Madrid; Leganés	(Argentina) Pablo Bouza	Jon Zabala
Switzerland	Stade Municipal Yverdon	6,600	Yverdon-les-Bains	(France) Olivier Nier	Cyril Lin

== Two-Year overall standings ==
Relegated to Trophy

2025–26 Rugby Europe Championships
Pos	Event Team	2025	2026	Points total
1	Georgia	10	8	18
2	Portugal	5	10	15
3	Spain	8	6	14
4	Romania	6	5	11
5	Belgium	4	4	8
6	Netherlands (Note: Overall points difference - Netherlands -8, Switzerland -340)	3	2	5
7	Switzerland	2	3	5
8	Germany	1	1	2

== Tables and fixtures ==
=== Pool A ===
Pos	Team	Pld	W	D	L	PF	PA	PD	TF	TA	TB	LB	Pts	Qualification
1	Georgia	3	3	0	0	157	45	+112	23	5	3	0	15	Grand Finals Semi-Finals
2	Spain	3	2	0	1	134	89	+45	20	13	2	0	10	Grand Finals Semi-Finals
3	Switzerland	3	1	0	2	46	130	−84	6	19	0	0	4	Ranking Finals Semi-Finals
4	Netherlands	3	0	0	3	68	141	−73	9	21	0	1	1	Ranking Finals Semi-Finals

Source: Rugby Europe
Rules for classification:
If two teams have the same number of points the best ranked will be: 1) match points in the games played between the tied Unions; 2) tries in the games played between the tied Unions; 3) match points difference in all pool games; 4) tries difference for in all pool games; 5) match points for in all pool games.
If three or more teams have same number of points, the best ranked will be: 1) match points difference in all pool games; 2) tries for in all pool games; 4) match points for in all pool games.
Points were awarded to the teams as follows: Win – 4 points, Draw – 2 points, At least 3 more tries than opponent – 1 point, Loss within 7 points – 1 point

==== Week 1 ====
7 February 2026
13:00 CET (UTC+1)

Netherlands	33–51	Spain (1 TBP)
	Report

NRCA Stadium, Amsterdam
Attendance: 2,000
Referee: (Italy) Filipo Russo

8 February 2026
13:00 CET (UTC+1)

Switzerland	3–54	Georgia (1 TBP)
	Report

Stade Municipal, Yverdon-les-Bains
Attendance: 2,200
Referee: (Romania) Alex Ionescu

==== Week 2 ====
14 February 2026
16:00 CET (UTC+1)

(1 TBP) Spain	53–14	Switzerland
	Report

Estadio Nueva Balastera, Palencia
Attendance: 1,715
Referee: (Netherlands) Edwin Van Der Spek

15 February 2026
13:00 CET (UTC+1)

Netherlands	12–61	Georgia (1 TBP)
	Report

NRCA Stadium, Amsterdam
Attendance: 2,000
Referee: (Ireland) Max Weston

==== Week 3 ====
21 February 2026
15:00 GET (UTC+4)

(1 TBP) Georgia	42–30	Spain
	Report

Avchala Stadium, Tbilisi
Attendance: 2,965
Referee: (Scotland) Sam Grove-White

22 February 2026
13:00 CET (UTC+1)

Switzerland	29–23	Netherlands (1 LBP)
	Report

Stade Municipal, Yverdon-les-Bains
Attendance: 1,800
Referee: (Portugal) Diogo Miranda

=== Pool B ===
Pos	Team	Pld	W	D	L	PF	PA	PD	TF	TA	TB	LB	Pts	Qualification
1	Portugal	3	3	0	0	159	36	+123	22	5	3	0	15	Grand Finals Semi-Finals
2	Romania	3	1	0	2	54	80	−26	6	11	0	1	5	Grand Finals Semi-Finals
3	Belgium	3	1	0	2	41	73	−32	5	7	1	0	5	Ranking Finals Semi-Finals
4	Germany	3	1	0	2	45	110	−65	6	16	0	0	4	Ranking Finals Semi-Finals

Source: Rugby Europe
Rules for classification:
If two teams have the same number of points the best ranked will be: 1) competition points; 2) match points difference; 3) match tries difference; 3) match points difference in all pool games; 4) tries for in all pool games; 5) match points for in all pool games.
If three or more teams have same number of points, the best ranked will be: 1) competition points; 2) tries for in all pool games; 3) match points for in all pool games.
Points were awarded to the teams as follows: Win – 4 points, Draw – 2 points, At least 3 more tries than opponent – 1 point, Loss within 7 points – 1 point

==== Week 1 ====
7 February 2026
20:00 CET (UTC+1)

Belgium	17–47	Portugal (1 TBP)
	Report

Stade Charles Tondreau, Mons
Attendance: 5,000
Referee: (France) Jérémy Rozier

8 February 2026
16:00 CET (UTC+1)

Germany	30–24	Romania (1 LBP)
	Report

Fritz-Grunebaum-Sportpark, Heidelberg
Attendance: 1,600
Referee: (Georgia (country)) Saba Makharadze

==== Week 2 ====
14 February 2026
13:00 CET (UTC+1)

Germany	12–68	Portugal (1 TBP)
	Report

Paul Greifzu Stadium, Dessau-Roßlau
Attendance: 3,400
Referee: (Italy) Alberto Favaro

15 February 2026
19:00 EET (UTC+2)

Romania	23–6	Belgium
	Report

Emil Alexandrescu Stadium, Iași
Attendance: n/a
Referee: (Georgia (country)) Saba Abulashvili

==== Week 3 ====
21 February 2026
20:00 CET (UTC+1)

(1 TBP) Belgium	18–3	Germany
	Report

Stade Charles Tondreau, Mons
Attendance: 3,000
Referee: (Georgia (country)) Shota Tevzadze

22 February 2026
17:30 WET (UTC+0)

(1 TBP) Portugal	44–7	Romania
	Report

Estádio Nacional, Oeiras
Attendance: 3,000
Referee: (France) Kevin Bralley

== Ranking Finals ==
Semi-finals
7 March – Stade Municipal, Yverdon-les-Bains
Switzerland	35
Germany	25
7 March – Province Naimette Arena, Liège
Belgium	38
Netherlands	15

Fifth-place Final
15 March – Estadio Nacional Complutense, Madrid
Switzerland	16
Belgium	39
Seventh-place Final
15 March – Estadio Nacional Complutense, Madrid
Germany	7
Netherlands	76

=== Semi-finals ===
7 March 2026
13:00 CET (UTC+1)

Switzerland	35–25	Germany
	Report

Stade Municipal, Yverdon-les-Bains
Attendance: 1,500
Referee: (Wales) Sion Carwin

7 March 2026
20:00 CET (UTC+1)

Belgium	38–15	Netherlands
	Report

Province Naimette Arena, Liège
Attendance: 700
Referee: (Portugal) Diogo Inacio

=== Seventh-place final ===
15 March 2026
11:00 CET (UTC+1)

Germany	7–76	Netherlands
	Report

Estadio Nacional Complutense, Madrid
Attendance: 1,600
Referee: (Georgia (country)) Saba Makharadze

=== Fifth-place final ===
15 March 2026
13:30 CET (UTC+1)

Switzerland	16–39	Belgium
	Report

Estadio Nacional Complutense, Madrid
Attendance: 1,600
Referee: (Spain) Eki Fanlo

== Grand Finals ==
Semi-finals
8 March – Avchala Stadium, Tbilisi
Georgia	53
Romania	30
8 March – Estádio do Restelo, Lisbon
Portugal	26
Spain	7

Cup Final
15 March – Butarque Stadium, Leganés
Georgia	17
Portugal	19
Bronze Final
15 March – Butarque Stadium, Leganés
Romania	23
Spain	29

=== Semi-finals ===
8 March 2026
15:00 GET (UTC+4)

Georgia	53–30	Romania
	Report

Avchala Stadium, Tbilisi
Attendance: 3,000
Referee: (Italy) Alberto Favaro

8 March 2026
15:00 WET (UTC+0)

Portugal	26–7	Spain
	Report

Estádio do Restelo, Lisbon
Attendance: 4,700
Referee: (Ireland) Keane Davison

=== Bronze Final ===
15 March 2026
16:00 CET (UTC+2)

Romania	23–29	Spain
	Report

Butarque Stadium, Leganés
Attendance: 6,000
Referee: (Italy) Filippo Russo

=== Final ===
15 March 2026
18:45 CET (UTC+2)

Georgia	17–19	Portugal
	Report

Butarque Stadium, Leganés
Attendance: 6,000
Referee: (France) Jérémy Rozier

== Final standings ==
Pos.	Team	Points
1	Portugal	10
2	Georgia	8
3	Spain	6
4	Romania	5
5	Belgium	4
6	Switzerland	3
7	Netherlands	2
8	Germany	1

== International broadcasters ==
Country	Broadcaster	Summary
Belgium	LN24; AUVIO; VRT/Sporza	Belgium games shown live via LN24, AUVIO and VRT/Sporza.
Georgia	Rugby TV; Imedi TV	Georgia games shown live via Rugby TV and Imedi TV. Also Georgia games are streamed and free on Rugby TV Facebook page.
Germany	Ran; Joyn; ProSieben Maxx	Germany games shown live via ProSieben Maxx and Joyn, other games are streamed and free on Ran.
Netherlands	Ziggo Sport	Selected games live on Ziggo Sport.
Portugal	Sport TV	Portugal games shown live on Sport TV.
Romania	TVR Sport	Romania games shown live via TVR Sport.
Spain	Teledeporte; RTVE Play	Spain games shown live via Teledeporte and .RTVE Play digital platform.
Switzerland	RTS PLAY	Switzerland games shown live via RTS PLAY digital platform.
North America	FloRugby	All games available through streaming via FloSports.
Rest of the World	Rugby Europe; Rugbypass	All games available through streaming via Rugby Europe (registration required) and Rugbypass (registration required). Some games are streamed and free on Rugby Europe Youtube channel

== See also ==
- Rugby Europe International Championships
- Antim Cup
