= João Pinto (disambiguation) =

João Pinto (born 1971) is a Portuguese footballer.

João Pinto may also refer to:

- João Pinto (footballer, born 1961), Portuguese football defender
- João Oliveira Pinto (1971–2024), Portuguese football midfielder
- João Manuel Pinto (born 1973), Portuguese football defender
- João Paulo (footballer, born 1980), Portuguese football forward
- João Luís Pinto, Portuguese rugby union coach
- João Teixeira Pinto (1876–1917), Portuguese military officer
