= Langelaan =

Langelaan is a surname. Notable people with the surname include:

- George Langelaan (1908–1972), British writer and journalist
- Hugo Langelaan (born 1990), Dutch rugby player
- Stuart Langelaan (born 1974), known professionally as Lange, British DJ and record producer
