= Martim Aguiar =

Portuguese rugby union player and coach

Martim Aguiar is a Portuguese rugby union coach and a former player. He played for Grupo Desportivo Direito, where he was also a coach. Aguiar became head coach of the Portugal national team on 13 September 2016 and signed a three-year contract. During his coaching tenure, Portugal participated in qualification for the 2019 Rugby World Cup, but failed to qualify. Also during his tenure, Portugal won the twice the 2017-18 Rugby Europe Trophy and the 2018–19 Rugby Europe Trophy, both with a grand slam, and also the one-game playoff match against Germany (37–32), for a place in the 2020 Rugby Europe Championship. He was replaced shortly after by French coach Patrice Lagisquet.

Sporting positions
Preceded by (Scotland) Ian Smith	Portugal national rugby union team coach 2016–2019	Succeeded by (France) Patrice Lagisquet
