= Hugo Langelaan =

Dutch rugby player

- Born: 27 March 1990 (age 36) Netherlands
- Height: 1.85 m (6 ft 1 in)
- Weight: 120 kg (18 st 13 lb; 260 lb)

Rugby union career
- Position: Loosehead Prop
- Current team: RC Eemland and Delta
Amateur team(s)
| Years | Team | Apps | (Points) |
| 2008-2012 | Rotterdamse Studenten RC | | |
| 2012–2019 | RC 't Gooi | | |
| 2019- | RC Eemland | | |
Senior career
| Years | Team | Apps | (Points) |
| 2021- | Delta | 7 | (0) |
- Correct as of 19 February 2023
International career
| Years | Team | Apps | (Points) |
| 2013–2023 | Netherlands | 52 | (5) |
- Correct as of 26 March 2023

Hugo Langelaan is an ex-Dutch international rugby union player who plays at RC Eemland in the Ereklasse and Delta in the Rugby Europe Super Cup. Who also works as an engineer for FedEx.

== Career ==
At 18 years old Hugo joined Rotterdamse Studenten RC. He played there for 4 years before moving to Ereklasse team, RC 't Gooi where in which he won the league title in 2012/13 and 2017/18.

In 2019 after 7 seasons with RC 't Gooi he joined rival club RC Eemland.

In 2021 he was named part of the Delta squad for the inaugural Rugby Europe Super Cup. He has on occasion captained the team.

== International career ==
Hugo made his international debut against Lithuania on the 10th of November 2012 in the 2012–2014 European Nations Cup Second Division. The Dutch won the game 16–24. He has captain the national team numerous times including being named captain for the 2023 Rugby Europe Championship.

He is the most capped Dutch rugby union player of all time winning his 50th cap in 2023, leading his team to a victory over Germany.

Hugo retired at the end of the 2023 Rugby Europe Championship scoring his first and only international try.

== Honours ==
2012–2014 European Nations Cup Second Division (Netherlands)

2012/13 Ereklasse (RC 't Gooi)

2017/18 Ereklasse (RC 't Gooi)

2019/20 Rugby Europe Trophy (Netherlands)

2022 Dutch Rugby Player of the Year
