= 2017–18 Rugby Europe Trophy =

- Date: 28 October 2017 – 14 April 2018
- Countries: Czech Republic; Moldova; Netherlands; Poland; Portugal; Switzerland

Tournament statistics
- Champions: Portugal (2nd title)
- Grand Slam: Portugal (2)
- Matches played: 15
- Attendance: 20,850 (1,390 per match)
- Tries scored: 98 (6.53 per match)
- Top point scorer(s): (Netherlands) Liam McBride (57)
- Top try scorer(s): (Netherlands) Sep Visser (8)
- Official website: 2018 Rugby Europe International Championships

The 2017–18 Rugby Europe Trophy is the second-level rugby union competition below the premier Championship. It is the second Trophy competition under its new format, that will see Czech Republic, Moldova, Netherlands, Poland, Portugal and Switzerland compete for the title, and a place in the Championship-Trophy promotion play-off.

This year's competition sees Czech Republic joining the Trophy after winning the Trophy-Conference 1 promotion play-off against Malta. This year sees no relegated team from the Rugby Championship, after last year's winner Portugal lost the Championship-Trophy promotion play-off against Belgium.

== Table ==
Champions and advances to
Promotion/relegation play-off
Relegated

Place	Nation	Games				Points			Try BP	Losing BP	Grand Slam BP	Table points
Place	Nation	played	won	drawn	lost	for	against	diff	Try BP	Losing BP	Grand Slam BP	Table points
1	Portugal	5	5	0	0	168	76	+92	2	0	1	23
2	Netherlands	5	4	0	1	199	110	+89	3	0	0	19
3	Czech Republic	5	3	0	2	93	120	−27	1	0	0	13
4	Switzerland	5	2	0	3	109	122	−13	1	2	0	11
5	Poland	5	1	0	4	106	147	−41	0	3	0	7
6	Moldova	5	0	0	5	58	158	−100	0	1	0	1
Points were awarded to the teams as follows: Win – 4 points Draw – 2 points Loss – 0 points Match bonus points: Scoring at least 3 more tries than the opponent – 1 point (or); Losing by 7 points or less – 1 point Overall bonus point: Completing a Grand Slam (winning all matches) – 1 point source: rugbyeurope.eu

== Fixtures ==
28 October 2017
14:00 CEST (UTC+02)

Czech Republic	19–14	Poland (1 LBP)
	Gamesheet

Marketa stadium, Prague
Attendance: 1,500
Referee: (Romania) Vlad Iordachescu

11 November 2017
13:00 EET (UTC+02)

Moldova	7–59	Netherlands (1 TBP)
	Gamesheet

Complexul Sportiv Raional, Orhei
Attendance: 400
Referee: (Italy) Claudio Blessano

18 November 2017
15:00 CET (UTC+01)

(1 LBP) Switzerland	27–30	Netherlands
	Gamesheet

Stade Municipal, Yverdon-les-Bains
Attendance: 2,000
Referee: (Spain) Iñigo Atorrasagasti

18 November 2017
15:00 WET (UTC+00)

(1 TBP) Portugal	45–12	Czech Republic
	Gamesheet

Complexo Desportivo do Estádio Nacional, Oeiras
Attendance: 1,000
Referee: (England) Christophe Ridley

18 November 2017
17:30 CET (UTC+01)

Poland	13–0	Moldova
	Gamesheet

Mosir Stadium, Gdańsk
Attendance: 3,000
Referee: (Portugal) Paulo Duarte

25 November 2017
13:00 EET (UTC+02)

(1 LBP) Moldova	20–22	Switzerland (1 TBP)
	Gamesheet

Complexul Sportiv Raional, Orhei
Attendance: 300
Referee: (Ireland) Nigel Correll

10 February 2018
15:00 WET (UTC+00)

(1 TBP) Portugal	36–12	Netherlands
	Gamesheet

Complexo Desportivo do Estádio Nacional, Oeiras
Attendance: 1,500
Referee: (France) Sébastien Minery

24 February 2018
15:00 WET (UTC+00)

Portugal	31–17	Switzerland
	Gamesheet

Complexo Municipal de Atletismo, Setúbal
Attendance: 1,500
Referee: (Romania) Vlad Iordachescu

3 March 2018
15:00 CET (UTC+01)

(1 TBP) Netherlands	71–30	Poland
	Gamesheet

NRCA Stadium, Amsterdam
Attendance: 4,000
Referee: (France) Ludovic Cayre

10 March 2018
15:00 EET (UTC+02)

Moldova	10–29	Portugal
	Gamesheet

Complexul Sportiv Raional, Orhei
Referee: (Georgia (country)) Shota Tevzadze

10 March 2018
14:00 CET (UTC+01)

Czech Republic	17–13	Switzerland (1 LBP)
	Gamesheet

Marketa stadium, Prague
Attendance: 800
Referee: (Romania) Vlad Iordachescu

17 March 2018
15:00 CET (UTC+01)

Switzerland	30–24	Poland (1 LBP)
	Gamesheet

Stade des Cherpines, Plan-les-Ouates
Attendance: 800
Referee: (Italy) Andrea Piardi

17 March 2018
15:00 CET (UTC+01)

(1 TBP) Netherlands	27–10	Czech Republic
	Gamesheet

NRCA Stadium, Amsterdam
Attendance: 2,500
Referee: (Belgium) Maxime Burlet

24 March 2018
18:00 CET (UTC+01)

Poland	25–27	Portugal
	Gamesheet

Stadion Widzewa, Łódź
Attendance: 600
Referee: (Wales) Dan Jones

21 April 2018
14:00 CET (UTC+01)

(1 TBP) Czech Republic	35–21	Moldova
	Gamesheet

Marketa stadium, Prague
Attendance: 600
Referee: (Scotland) Finlay Brown

== Relegation/Promotion play-off ==
10 November 2018
16:00 EET (UTC+02)

Romania	36–6	Portugal
	Gamesheet

TBC
Attendance: 3,000
Referee: (England) Ian Tempest

== Top scorers ==
=== Top points scorers ===
Pos	Name	Team	Pts
1	Liam McBride	Netherlands	57
2	Louis Rodrigues	Portugal	55
3	Sep Visser	Netherlands	40

=== Top try scorers ===
Pos	Name	Team	Tries
1	Sep Visser	Netherlands	8
2	Josh Gascoigne	Netherlands	5
3	Siem Noorman	Netherlands	4

== See also ==
- Rugby Europe International Championships
- 2017–18 Rugby Europe International Championships
- Six Nations Championship
- Antim Cup
