= Ian Smith (rugby union, born 1965) =

Scotland international rugby union player

- Born: Ian Richard Smith; 16 March 1965 (age 61) Gloucester, England
- Height: 1.85 m (6 ft 1 in)
- Weight: 94 kg (14 st 11 lb)
- School: Sir Thomas Rich's School
- Occupation: Civil engineer

Rugby union career
- Position: Flanker
Amateur team(s)
Years	Team	Apps	(Points)
-	Gloucester		
Provincial / State sides
Years	Team	Apps	(Points)
-	Scottish Exiles		
International career
Years	Team	Apps	(Points)
1989	England 'B'		
1990–92	Scotland 'B'	3	(0)
1992–95	Scotland 'A'	6	(0)
1992–97	Scotland	25	(0)
National sevens team
Years	Team		Comps
1991	Scotland 7s		
Coaching career
- Years: Team
- 2004: Moseley
- 2011: Georgia (Asst. Coach)
- 2016: Portugal

Ian Richard Smith (born 16 March 1965) is a former Scotland international rugby union player. He is now a rugby union coach.

== Rugby Union career ==
=== Amateur career ===
He was educated at the Sir Thomas Rich's School in Longlevens. He went on to play for Gloucester. He formerly played as a flanker. Smith made his senior debut aged 18 and by 1996 had played more than 350 games for them.

=== Provincial career ===
He played for the Scottish Exiles district in the Scottish Inter-District Championship. Smith stated: "I always wanted to play for Scotland, from the days of watching the Five Nations sat on my grandfather’s knee."

=== International career ===
He represented England 'B' against Spain in 1989. He also qualified for Scotland through his paternal grandparents and Ian McGeechan persuaded him to play for Scotland.

He played for Scotland 'B' against Ireland 'B' on 22 December 1990.

In 1991 he played for Scotland 7s in the Hong Kong Sevens tournament.

He made his full test debut for Scotland against England at Murrayfield on 18 January 1992. He played one match at the 1995 World Cup. His last international appearance was against South Africa at Murrayfield on 6 December 1997. He gained 25 caps for Scotland in the period 1992–97.

He played 7 matches for the Barbarian F.C. and scored 9 points between 1990 and 1993. He captained the team against Newport in 1992.

=== Coaching career ===
In 2004 returned to Moseley as head coach. In 2009 Mosely beat Leeds at Twickenham to win the EDF Energy National Trophy.

In 2011 he went on to a coaching role with the Georgia national rugby union team. He was appointed interim and later effective head coach of Portugal going into the World Rugby Nations Cup in 2016.

== Outside of rugby union ==
He worked as a civil engineer.

Sporting positions
Preceded by (France) Olivier Baragnon	Portugal National Rugby Union Coach; 2016–2016	Succeeded by (Portugal) Martim Aguiar
