= Portugal national rugby union team =

National rugby union team

Portugal
- Nickname: Os Lobos (The Wolves)
- Emblem: Portuguese shield
- Union: Portuguese Rugby Federation
- Head coach: Simon Mannix
- Captain: Tomás Appleton
- Most caps: Gonçalo Uva (101); Vasco Uva (101)
- Top scorer: Samuel Marques (343)
- Top try scorer: Rodrigo Marta (43)
- Home stadium: Various
First colours	Second colours

World Rugby ranking
- Current: 14 (as of 16 March 2026)
- Highest: 13 (2023)
- Lowest: 30 (2015, 2016)

First international
- Portugal 5–6 Spain (Lisbon, Portugal; 13 April 1935)

Biggest win
- Portugal 93–0 Czech Republic (Caldas da Rainha, Portugal; 23 March 2019)

Biggest defeat
- Portugal 7–106 Ireland (Algés, Portugal; 12 July 2025)

World Cup
- Appearances: 3 (first in 2007)
- Best result: Pool stage (2007, 2023)
- Website: fpr.pt

The Portugal national rugby union team, nicknamed Os Lobos (The Wolves), represents Portugal in men's international competitions, They are administered by the Portuguese Rugby Federation. Portugal have experienced modest success in the last two decades. They qualified for the 2007 Rugby World Cup in France and though they lost all their matches, they managed to score one try in each game and led against Romania until the late minutes.

Portugal qualified for their second Rugby World Cup in 2022, topping a repechage qualifying group featuring the United States, Hong Kong, and Kenya to qualify for the 2023 Rugby World Cup. In that edition of the tournament, Portugal got their first draw in a Rugby World Cup against Georgia 18–18, and got their first ever win in the Rugby World Cup when they beat Fiji 24–23. Portugal will play in its third Rugby World Cup in 2027.

== History ==
=== Early ===
Portugal played its first ever rugby international in April 1935 against Spain, losing by a single point, 6–5. They played Spain again the following year with Spain winning 16–9. Portugal had more regular competition from the mid-1960s, and won their first game in 1966, defeating Spain 9–3. Portugal played Italy for the first time in 1967, losing 6–3. They also had their first match against Romania soon after and lost by 40 points. They defeated Belgium in 1968, and also played Morocco for the first time.

The first game of the 1970s was a draw against the Netherlands. Portugal managed to draw with Italy (nil all) in 1972 and following that, defeated them 9–6 in 1973. After a number of mixed results throughout the early 1970s, Portugal won five matches in a row from 1979 through to 1981. They played Morocco, who won the encounter. After a 1983 draw against Spain, Portugal managed a seven-game winning streak from 1984 to 1985, including wins over Belgium, Denmark, Morocco, Czechoslovakia, Poland and Zimbabwe. The first Rugby World Cup was held in 1987, though it was by invitation, thus there was no qualifying tournament and Portugal did not participate.

=== 1990s ===
From 1989 to 1990, the 1991 World Cup qualifiers were held for the European nations. Portugal started in Round 2b in October 1989. They defeated Czechoslovakia 15 to 13 in Ricant to advance to Round 2c. However here they were defeated by the Netherlands 32–3 and eliminated from qualifying.

Portugal again participated in the 1995 World Cup qualifying competition for European teams, starting in Round 1. They were pooled in the West Group, and defeated Belgium and Switzerland, but lost to Spain, advancing into Round 2. Here Wales defeated them, and they lost to Spain.

Portugal began in Pool 3 of Round B in the European qualifying competition for the 1999 Rugby World Cup. Portugal won all their group matches, except for the one against Spain, and still finished second in the group, which took them into Pool 3 of Round C. All games were held in Edinburgh, Scotland. Portugal lost 85–11 to Scotland, and 21–17 to Spain. Both Scotland and Spain went through to the World Cup; Portugal went into repechage, where Portugal lost a home and away series to Uruguay.

=== 2000s ===
In 2002, Portugal began playing for a place in the 2003 Rugby World Cup in Pool A of Round 3 of the European qualifying tournament. They were grouped with Spain and Poland. Each nation only won one game, though on for and against Portugal finished second to Spain. Portugal were knocked out of competition. In 2003–04, Portugal won the European Nations Cup, losing only one match to win their first championship. In 2004, Professor Tomaz Morais, coach of the Portugal national team at both sevens and fifteen a side, was nominated for the IRB's coach of the year award. This was a remarkable achievement for a coach from a third tier rugby nation. Morais has been credited with much of Portugal's progress in recent years.

In 2006, it was announced that Portugal would receive a grant from the IRB to help develop their rugby to Tier 2 standard. Few details were released regarding how the money was spent, but it was hoped it would ensure that Portugal's rugby would be able to move onto the next level. In 2006, the inaugural IRB Nations Cup was hosted in Lisbon. The tournament featured Portugal, Russia, Argentina A and Italy A.

=== 2007 World Cup ===
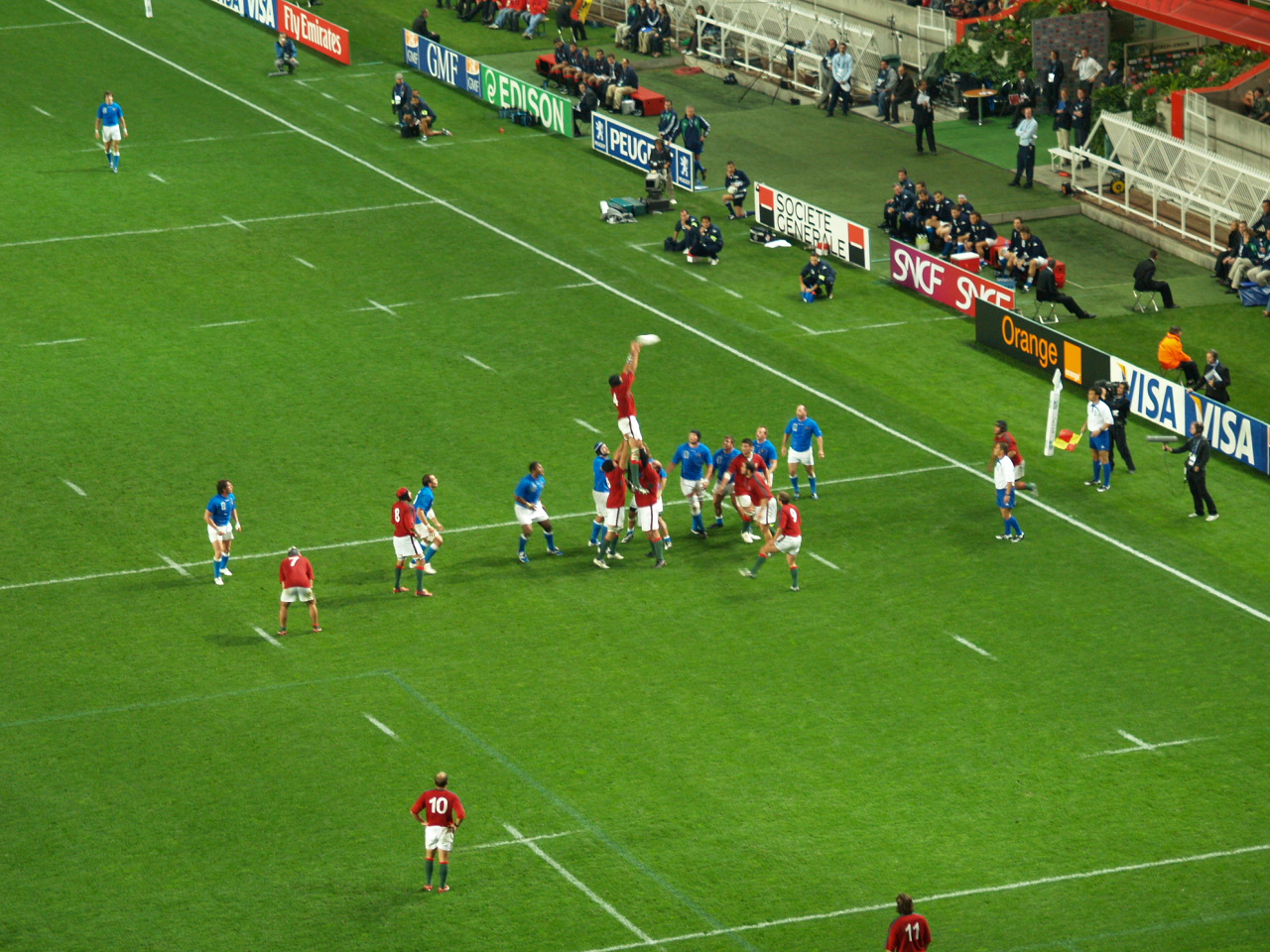
Portugal (in red) playing Italy

Portugal began their qualification campaign for the 2007 Rugby World Cup in 2004, as part of the European Nations Cup Division 1 2004–06 tournament. They won their first match, defeating Ukraine 6–36. They then defeated Georgia 18–14 in their second match, won their third match against the Czech Republic, defeated Russia as well, but then lost to Romania. Portugal then drew with Russia 19-all and lost to Georgia. After a loss to Romania and a win against the Czech Republic, Portugal finished third overall in the standings, and qualified for Round 5.

Round 5 was played in October 2006 as a three match series between Italy, Russia and Portugal. Both Portugal and Russia lost heavily in their matches against Italy, who easily qualified for the finals. Second place came down to the final match of the round in Lisbon. Portugal won the match 26–23 against Russia to make it to Round 6. Round 6 was a home and away series against the Round 5 Pool B winners, Georgia. Portugal lost the first match, but drew 11-all in the second meeting. Georgia went through to the finals, and Portugal entered the repechage round where they defeated Morocco 26–20 on aggregate.

Portugal then faced Uruguay for the last position in the finals. In the first leg of the two-match Repechage series, Portugal won 12–5. In the second game in Montevideo Portugal lost 18–12. On aggregate, Portugal won 24–23, sending them to their first ever World Cup. Having qualified for their first World Cup, several players were subsequently arrested in the ensuing celebrations as a result of an altercation with local police. No charges were laid and the players involved were allowed to leave Uruguay.

In the 2007 Rugby World Cup, Portugal went to Pool C, alongside favourites the All Blacks, Italy, Romania and Scotland. Portugal's highlights included preventing Italy getting a bonus point, scoring a try against the All Blacks, and coming within a try of beating Romania before losing 14–10. They also managed to score in all the four games, unlike Scotland and Romania. The Portugal team were celebrated for their commitment and passion, and for being the only amateur team to make it to the World Cup.

=== 2008–present ===
After the World Cup, Portugal faced some problems, including the end of the club and international careers of several key players, like Joaquim Ferreira, Paulo Murinello, Samuel Belo and Rui Cordeiro, and achieved only one win over Czech Republic in the final round of the European Nations Cup tournament, finishing in 5th place, their worst result since 2002.

On 1 November 2008, they lost at home against Canada 21–13 in a friendly game. After a disappointing campaign under Tomaz Morais in the 2006–2008 edition of the Six Nations B, that would qualify for the 2011 Rugby World Cup finals, Murray Henderson was assigned as Specialist Forward coach.

Portugal missed the second presence at the Rugby World Cup finals, after two surprising losses at home with Georgia (10–16) and Romania (9–20), which the "Lobos" had previously defeated 22–21 abroad. Portugal thus missed the 3rd place that would have granted access to the Rugby World Cup repechage.

Tomaz Morais was replaced by New Zealand coach Errol Brain, in October 2010, with a three years contract. He had mixed results, starting with strong performances but ended up with disappointing games. He was replaced by Frederico Sousa in October 2013.

Portugal lost to Germany in the 2015–16 European Nations Cup Division 1A, finishing last, resulting in relegation for the following year.

After Portugal got relegated to the 2016–17 Rugby Europe Trophy, Portugal went on to win the tournament 3 times in a row until the 2018–19 season, when they were granted promotion to the Rugby Europe Championship. Since then, Portugal have been quite successful in the competition. In the 2020–21 season, they finished 3rd place in a league system and in the 2022–23 season, they finished 1st place in a pool with Romania, Poland and Belgium, which led them to a semi-final with Spain, which they won (27–10), going all the way to the final in Badajoz, which they lost to Georgia (38–11).

Portugal qualified for the 2023 Rugby World Cup through the repechage tournament held in Dubai, beating Hong Kong, Kenya and drawing with the USA (16–16) on the last game, winning the repechage tournament on point difference.

They had a successful tournament, coming 4th in Pool C. They drew 18–18 with Georgia and pulled off a shock upset by beating Fiji 24–23. After the tournament, their world ranking was 13th, the highest they had ever been.

Portugal won the 2026 Rugby Europe Championship, after beating Georgia 19-17 in the final.

== Kits ==
=== Kit providers ===
As of 2016 their kit supplier is Macron S.p.A.

Year	Kit manufacturer	Main shirt sponsor
2005–2008	Quebramar	Caixa Geral de Depósitos
2008–2014	Adidas	Caixa Geral de Depósitos
2014–2016	Canterbury	Caixa Geral de Depósitos
2016–2019	Macron	Caixa Geral de Depósitos
2019–2020	Macron	CV&A Consulting
2020–	Macron	Banco Santander

== Record ==
=== Rugby Europe International Championships ===
ENC champions

Season	Division	Head Coach	Captain	G	W	D	L	PF	PA	+/−	Pts	Pos
2000	Championship	(New Zealand) Evan Crawford		5	2	0	3	74	100	–26	9	5th
2001	Championship	(New Zealand) Evan Crawford		5	1	0	4	77	165	–88	7	5th
2002	Championship	(Portugal) Tomaz Morais	Rohan Hoffmann	5	2	0	3	93	130	–37	9	4th
2003	Championship	(Portugal) Tomaz Morais	Luís Pissarra	5	5	0	0	153	85	+68	15	1st
2004	Championship	(Portugal) Tomaz Morais	Luís Pissarra	5	4	0	1	92	95	-3	13	2nd
2005	Championship	(Portugal) Tomaz Morais	Luís Pissarra	5	4	0	1	101	73	+28	13	3rd
2006	Championship	(Portugal) Tomaz Morais	Vasco Uva	5	2	1	2	92	100	-8	10	4th
2007	Championship	(Portugal) Tomaz Morais	Vasco Uva	5	2	0	3	58	96	–38	9	4th
2008	Championship	(Portugal) Tomaz Morais	João Correia	5	1	0	4	116	100	+16	7	5th
2009	Championship	(Portugal) Tomaz Morais	João Correia	5	3	1	1	124	84	+40	12	3rd
2010	Championship	(Portugal) Tomaz Morais	João Correia	5	2	0	3	131	65	+66	9	4th
2011	Championship	(New Zealand) Errol Brain	João Correia	5	3	0	2	113	98	+15	14	3rd
2012	Championship	(New Zealand) Errol Brain	Gonçalo Uva	5	1	0	4	102	132	–30	7	5th
2013	Championship	(New Zealand) Errol Brain	João Correia	5	1	1	3	75	96	–21	7	4th
2014	Championship	(Portugal) Frederico Sousa	João Correia	5	1	0	4	70	126	–56	5	5th
2015	Championship	(Portugal) João Luís Pinto	Vasco Uva	5	1	0	4	52	100	–48	5	5th
2016	Championship	(Scotland) Ian Smith	Francisco Pinto Magalhães	5	0	0	5	72	210	–138	1	6th*
2017	Trophy	(Portugal) Martim Aguiar	Francisco Pinto Magalhães	5	5	0	0	179	37	+142	25	1st
2018	Trophy	(Portugal) Martim Aguiar	João Lino	5	5	0	0	168	76	+92	23	1st
2019	Trophy	(Portugal) Martim Aguiar	Salvador Vassalo	5	5	0	0	272	31	+242	25	1st
2020	Championship	(France) Patrice Lagisquet	Tomás Appleton	5	2	0	3	98	111	-13	9	4th
2021	Championship	(France) Patrice Lagisquet	Tomás Appleton	5	3	0	2	196	139	+57	14	3rd
2022	Championship	(France) Patrice Lagisquet	Tomás Appleton	5	2	1	2	139	98	+41	12	4th
2023	Championship	(France) Patrice Lagisquet	Tomás Appleton	5	4	0	1	195	88	+107	19	2nd
2024	Championship	(Portugal) João Mirra	Tomás Appleton	5	3	0	2	152	107	+45	15	2nd
2025	Championship	(New Zealand) Simon Mannix	Tomás Appleton	5	3	0	2	168	113	+55	15	4th
2026	Championship	(New Zealand) Simon Mannix	José Madeira	5	5	0	0	185	53	+105	24	1st

Notes: Portugal's last place finish in the 2014–16 European Nations Cup First Division resulted in their relegation to 2016–17 Rugby Europe Trophy in the following year.

=== World Rugby Nations Cup ===
Year	G	W	D	L	PF	PA	+/−	Pts	Pos
(Portugal) 2006	3	0	1	2	62	87	–25	3	4th
(Romania) 2007	did not enter								
(Romania) 2008	did not enter								
(Romania) 2009	did not enter								
(Romania) 2010	did not enter								
(Romania) 2011	3	1	0	2	60	89	–29	5	6th
(Romania) 2012	3	0	0	3	37	104	–67	1	6th
(Romania) 2013	did not enter								
(Romania) 2014	did not enter								
(Romania) 2015	did not enter								

=== World Cup Record ===
Rugby World Cup record									Qualification						
Year	Round	Pld	W	D	L	PF	PA	Squad	Pos	Pld	W	D	L	PF	PA
(New Zealand) (Australia) 1987	Not invited								Not invited						
(England) (France) (Ireland) (Scotland) (Wales) 1991	Did not qualify								P/O	2	1	0	1	18	45
(South Africa) 1995	Did not qualify								3rd	5	2	0	3	85	177
(Wales) 1999	Did not qualify								P/O	8	3	0	5	181	245
(Australia) 2003	Did not qualify								2nd	2	1	0	1	60	60
(France) 2007	Pool Stage	4	0	0	4	38	209	Squad	P/O	18	10	2	6	283	360
(New Zealand) 2011	Did not qualify								4th	10	5	1	4	255	149
(England) 2015	Did not qualify								2nd	10	2	1	7	145	222
(Japan) 2019	Did not qualify								P/O	7	6	0	1	237	65
(France) 2023	Pool Stage	4	1	1	2	64	103	Squad	P/O	13	7	2	4	478	267
(Australia) 2027	Qualified								1st	3	3	0	0	130	50
(United States) 2031	To be determined								To be determined						
Total	—	8	1	1	6	102	312	—	—	78	40	6	32	1872	1640
Champions; Runners–up; Third place; Fourth place; Home venue

=== Overall ===
Men's World Rugby Rankings Top 30 as of 16 November 2026
Rank	Change (Note: Change from the previous week)	Team	Points
1	Steady	South Africa	91.53
2	Steady	New Zealand	90.65
3	▲1	France	89.05
4	▼1	Ireland	88.70
5	Steady	England	86.99
6	Steady	Scotland	85.28
7	Steady	Australia	82.24
8	Steady	Argentina	82.09
9	▲1	Wales	79.37
10	▼1	Fiji	77.79
11	Steady	Italy	75.84
12	Steady	Japan	75.25
13	Steady	Georgia	74.23
14	▲1	United States	68.39
15	▼1	Portugal	68.24
16	▲3	Samoa	67.60
17	▲1	Chile	67.00
18	▼2	Spain	66.53
19	▼2	Tonga	65.58
20	Steady	Uruguay	65.17
21	Steady	Canada	63.38
22	Steady	Belgium	62.00
23	Steady	Romania	61.13
24	Steady	Hong Kong	58.46
25	Steady	Zimbabwe	57.71
26	Steady	Netherlands	56.44
27	Steady	Namibia	56.03
28	Steady	Switzerland	55.47
29	Steady	Czech Republic	55.42
30	Steady	Poland	54.54

Portugal's historical rankings

Source: World Rugby
Graph updated to 16 November 2026

==== Head to head results ====
Below is a table of the representative rugby matches played by a Portugal national XV at test level up until 14 November 2026, updated after match with Samoa.

Opponent	Played	Won	Lost	Drawn	% Won
Andorra	3	3	0	0	100%
Argentina XV	4	1	3	0	25%
Australia	1	0	1	0	0%
Australia A	1	0	1	0	0%
Barbarians	1	0	1	0	0%
Belgium	20	14	4	2	70%
Brazil	6	4	0	2	66.67%
Canada	7	3	4	0	42.86%
Chile	5	5	0	0	100%
Czechoslovakia	2	2	0	0	100%
Czech Republic	10	10	0	0	100%
Denmark	2	2	0	0	100%
England A	1	0	1	0	0%
Fiji	3	1	2	0	33.33%
France A	3	0	3	0	0%
Georgia	28	5	19	4	17.86%
Germany	11	8	3	0	72.73%
Hong Kong	3	2	1	0	66.67%
Ireland	1	0	1	0	0%
Italy	13	1	11	1	7.69%
Italy A	2	0	1	1	0%
Japan	1	0	1	0	0%
Japan XV	1	0	1	0	0%
Kenya	2	1	1	0	50%
Lithuania	1	1	0	0	100%
Moldova	2	2	0	0	100%
Morocco	14	7	5	2	50%
Namibia	9	3	6	0	33.33%
Netherlands	17	13	3	1	76.47%
New Zealand	1	0	1	0	0%
Poland	12	9	3	0	75%
Romania	32	8	24	0	25%
Russia	21	6	14	1	28.57%
Samoa	1	0	1	0	0%
Scotland	2	0	2	0	0%
Scotland XV	1	0	1	0	0%
South Africa	1	0	1	0	0%
Soviet Union	2	0	2	0	0%
Spain	43	14	27	2	32.56%
Sweden	2	2	0	0	100%
Switzerland	7	7	0	0	100%
Tonga	2	1	1	0	50%
Tunisia	9	3	6	0	33.33%
Ukraine	5	4	1	0	80%
United States	6	1	4	1	16.67%
Uruguay	10	3	7	0	30%
Yugoslavia	3	2	0	1	66.67%
Wales	2	0	2	0	0%
West Germany	3	1	2	0	33.33%
Zimbabwe	4	2	2	0	50%
Total (Note: Only includes test matches in which the Portuguese Rugby Federation awarded caps to the players involved, according to their official website.)	343	151	174	18	44.02%

== Players ==
=== Current squad ===
On 26 October, Portugal named a 39 player squad ahead of the 2026 World Rugby Nations Cup European-African-Asian Series.

Head Coach: (New Zealand) Simon Mannix

- Caps updated: 14 November 2026 (after Portugal v Samoa)

Player	Position	Date of birth (age)	Caps	Club/province
Luka Begic	Hooker	19 January 2001 (age 25)	27	(France) Biarritz
Jason Cornelius	Hooker	21 April 2000 (age 26)	0	(Portugal) SL Benfica / (Portugal) Lusitanos XV
Pedro Santiago Lopes	Hooker	15 December 2003 (age 22)	5	(Portugal) Cascais
Nuno Mascarenhas	Hooker	18 May 1998 (age 28)	37	(Portugal) Cascais / (Portugal) Lusitanos XV
Abel da Cunha	Prop	13 January 2002 (age 24)	18	(Portugal) Lusitanos XV
Alex dos Santos	Prop	14 August 2001 (age 25)	0	(France) Albi
Diogo Ferreira	Prop	17 October 1996 (age 30)	58	(France) Dax
António Prim	Prop	7 December 2002 (age 23)	23	(Portugal) Direito / (Portugal) Lusitanos XV
Cody Thomas	Prop	1 March 1996 (age 30)	17	(France) Grenoble
Giorgi Turabelidze	Prop	6 November 1996 (age 30)	0	(Portugal) VRAC / (Portugal) Lusitanos XV
Pedro Vicente	Prop	7 November 2002 (age 24)	10	(Portugal) Agronomia / (Portugal) Lusitanos XV
Martim Bello	Lock	27 September 2000 (age 26)	27	(Portugal) Cascais / (Portugal) Lusitanos XV
António Rebelo de Andrade	Lock	12 December 2000 (age 25)	9	(Portugal) Agronomia / (Portugal) Lusitanos XV
Pedro Ferreira	Lock	15 October 1998 (age 28)	2	(Portugal) Direito / (Portugal) Lusitanos XV
José Madeira	Lock	19 March 2001 (age 25)	55	(France) Perpignan
Duarte Nunes	Lock	11 May 2005 (age 21)	3	(Portugal) Direito / (Portugal) Lusitanos XV
Duarte Torgal	Lock	23 December 1997 (age 28)	35	(Portugal) Direito / (Portugal) Lusitanos XV
Francisco Almeida	Back row	8 October 2004 (age 22)	5	(Portugal) Belenenses / (Portugal) Lusitanos XV
André da Cunha	Back row	19 May 2004 (age 22)	8	(Portugal) Belenenses / (Portugal) Lusitanos XV
João Granate	Back row	21 February 1997 (age 29)	51	(Portugal) Direito / (Portugal) Lusitanos XV
Nicolas Martins	Back row	18 January 1999 (age 27)	34	(France) Racing 92
José Monteiro	Back row	8 November 2005 (age 21)	11	(Portugal) CDUL / (Portugal) Lusitanos XV
David Wallis	Back row	17 April 1997 (age 29)	40	(Portugal) Belenenses / (Portugal) Lusitanos XV
Tomás Amado	Scrum-half	8 September 2005 (age 21)	6	(Portugal) Agronomia / (Portugal) Lusitanos XV
Hugo Camacho	Scrum-half	27 May 2004 (age 22)	22	(France) Albi
Samuel Marques	Scrum-half	8 December 1988 (age 37)	36	(France) Carcassonne
Hugo Aubry	Fly-half	28 January 2003 (age 23)	16	(Portugal) Lusitanos XV
Domingos Cabral	Fly-half	16 August 2001 (age 25)	10	(Portugal) Agronomia / (Portugal) Lusitanos XV
Tomás Appleton (c)	Centre	29 July 1993 (age 33)	90	(Portugal) CDUL / (Portugal) Lusitanos XV
Jordan Bacon	Centre	13 August 2002 (age 24)	0	(Portugal) Lusitanos XV
Vasco Durão	Centre	24 November 2001 (age 24)	0	(Portugal) Cascais / (Portugal) Lusitanos XV
Rodrigo Marta	Centre	18 November 1999 (age 27)	51	(France) Pau
Simão Bento	Wing	21 June 2001 (age 25)	30	(France) Colomiers
Lucas Martins	Wing	16 January 2003 (age 23)	5	(France) Agen
Manuel Cardoso Pinto	Wing	7 April 1998 (age 28)	51	(Portugal) Agronomia / (Portugal) Lusitanos XV
Vincent Pinto	Wing	10 April 1999 (age 27)	31	(France) Colomiers
Raffaele Storti	Wing	19 December 2000 (age 25)	41	(France) Grenoble
Joris Moura	Fullback	7 May 2000 (age 26)	8	(France) Valence Romans
Manuel Vareiro	Fullback	14 January 2005 (age 21)	16	(France) Provence

==== Recent call-ups ====
The following players were also named to a squad in the last years.

Note: Flags indicate national union for the club/province as defined by World Rugby.

Player	Position	Date of birth (age)	Caps	Club/province	Last call-up
Lucas Da Silva	Hooker	19 December 1997 (age 28)	0	(France) CA Brive	2024 end-of-year rugby union internationals
Duarte Diniz	Hooker	8 November 1995 (age 31)	18	(Portugal) GD Direito	2023 Rugby World Cup
David Costa	Prop	5 July 1999 (age 27)	36	(Portugal) GD Direito	2025 end-of-year rugby union internationals
Diogo Hasse Ferreira (fr)	Prop	17 October 1996 (age 30)	48	(France) US Dax	2025–26 Rugby Europe International Championships
Martim Souto	Prop	14 April 2005 (age 21)	1	(France) RC Orléans	2025 end-of-year rugby union internationals
Alex Dos Santos	Prop	14 August 2001 (age 25)	0	(France) SC Albi	2025 end-of-year rugby union internationals
António Machado Santos	Prop	7 June 1998 (age 28)	9	(Spain) Alcobendas Rugby	2025 end-of-year rugby union internationals
Steevy Cerqueira (fr)	Lock	9 August 1993 (age 33)	18	(France) RC Orléans	2025–26 Rugby Europe International Championships
José Rebelo de Andrade	Lock	24 November 1997 (age 28)	20	(Portugal) Agronomia	2025–26 Rugby Europe International Championships
Kevin Batista	Lock	24 July 1995 (age 31)	4	(France) Stade Bagnérais	2024 end-of-year rugby union internationals
Nicolas Fernandes	Lock	12 January 2000 (age 26)	1	(France) RCS Rumilly	2024 end-of-year rugby union internationals
Diego Pinheiro Ruiz (fr)	Back row	11 September 2003 (age 23)	14	(France) CS Annonay	2025–26 Rugby Europe International Championships
Nicolas Martins	Back row	18 January 1999 (age 27)	34	(France) Racing 92	2025–26 Rugby Europe International Championships
Vasco Baptista	Back row	26 October 1996 (age 30)	17	(Portugal) Belenenses	2025 end-of-year rugby union internationals
Manuel Picão	Back row	10 April 1997 (age 29)	23	(Portugal) GD Direito	2023–24 Rugby Europe International Championships
David Wallis	Back row	17 April 1997 (age 29)	32	(Portugal) Belenenses	2025–26 Rugby Europe International Championships
Joris Moura (fr)	Fly-half	7 May 2000 (age 26)	8	(France) Valence Romans DR	2025–26 Rugby Europe International Championships
José Lima	Centre	24 April 1992 (age 34)	58	(Portugal) SL Benfica	2025 end-of-year rugby union internationals
Gabriel Aviragnet	Centre	25 September 2003 (age 23)	4	(France) SC Albi	2025 end-of-year rugby union internationals
Rodrigo Marta	Wing	18 November 1999 (age 27)	44	(France) Section Paloise	2025–26 Rugby Europe International Championships
Lucas Martins (fr)	Wing	16 January 2003 (age 23)	5	(France) SU Agen	2024 end-of-year rugby union internationals
José Paiva dos Santos	Wing	3 April 2001 (age 25)	7	(Portugal) Belenenses	2025 end-of-year rugby union internationals
Diogo Rodrigues	Wing	4 March 2001 (age 25)	4	(Portugal) Belenenses	2025–26 Rugby Europe International Championships
Pierre Sayerse	Wing	5 June 1996 (age 30)	2	(France) Stade Montois	2023–24 Rugby Europe International Championships
Dany Antunes (fr)	Fullback	15 September 1997 (age 29)	11	(France) OMR Marcq Rugby Lille Métropole	2021–22 Rugby Europe International Championships
Simão Bento (fr)	Fullback	21 June 2001 (age 25)	27	(France) Colomiers Rugby	2025 end-of-year rugby union internationals
Nuno Sousa Guedes	Fullback	21 November 1994 (age 31)	27	(Portugal) CDUP	2025–26 Rugby Europe International Championships

^{EXT} Player was called up to extended squad only (e.g. Training Panel, Travelling Cover)
^{INJ} Player withdrew from the squad due to an injury.
^{OTH} Player withdrew from the squad for other reasons/reasons not stated.
^{RET} Player retired from the national team/professional rugby.
^{SUS} Player withdrew from the squad due to suspension.

=== Individual all-time records ===
Gonçalo Uva and Vasco Uva are the most capped players for Portugal (both 101) and Gonçalo Uva also has the record for most matches in the starting XV (95). The highest scorer for Portugal is Gonçalo Malheiro, with 279 points. Malheiro is also the player with the most drop goals (12) and penalty goals (51). Pedro Leal holds the record for most conversions (45). Rodrigo Marta with 43 tries is the player with the most tries scored. Duarte Pinto has the record for most matches as a substitute, with 23 substitutions. Bernardo Duarte holds the record for most matches as a substitute, without ever playing in the starting XV (14).

== Coaches ==
=== Current coaching staff ===
Correct as of 29 October 2026

Position	Name
Head coach	(New Zealand) Simon Mannix
Forwards coach	(Ireland) Andi Kyriacou
Backs coach	(France) Anthony Tesquet

=== Coaching history ===
Name	Years	Tests	Won	Drew	Lost	Win percentage	Source
(Portugal) Pedro Lynce	1976–1983	10	6	0	4	60%	
(Portugal) João Paulo Bessa	1983–1986	17	9	1	7	52.94%	
(Portugal) Vasco Lynce	1986–1989	15	4	1	10	26.67%	
(Portugal) Olegário Borges	1989–1993	14	7	0	7	50%	
(Scotland) Andrew Cushing	1993–1994	12	2	0	10	16.67%	
(Portugal) João Paulo Bessa	1994–1999	25	12	1	12	48%	
(New Zealand) Evan Crawford	1999–2001	11	3	0	8	27.27%	
(Portugal) Tomaz Morais	2001–2010	76	33	4	39	43.42%	
(New Zealand) Errol Brain	2010–2013	26	9	1	16	34.62%	
(Portugal) Frederico Sousa	2013–2014	8	2	0	6	25%	
(Portugal) João Luís Pinto	2014–2015	7	2	0	5	28.57%	
(France) Olivier Baragnon	2015–2016	3	1	0	2	33.33%	
(Scotland) Ian Smith	2016	5	0	0	5	0%	
(Portugal) Martim Aguiar	2016–2019	23	18	0	5	78.26%	
(France) Patrice Lagisquet	2019–2023	37	18	3	16	48.65%	
(France) Sébastien Bertrank	2023	0	0	0	0	0%	
(Portugal) João Mirra (interim)	2024	5	3	0	2	60%	
(New Zealand) Simon Mannix	2024–	23	14	0	9	60.87%	

Last updated: 14 November 2026.

== Player records ==
=== Most caps ===
#	Player	Pos	Span	Mat	Pts	Tries
1	Gonçalo Uva	Lock	2004–2018	101	50	10
1	Vasco Uva	Number 8	2003–2016	101	65	13
3	Tomás Appleton	Centre	2014–	90	95	19
4	Joaquim Ferreira	Prop	1993–2007	87	15	3
5	António Aguilar	Wing	1999–2014	83	115	23
6	João Correia	Hooker	2003–2014	81	20	4
7	Pedro Leal	Fullback	2005–2017	77	265	5
8	Diogo Mateus	Centre	2000–2010	74	65	13
9	Luís Pissarra	Scrum-half	1996–2007	72	0	0
10	José Lima	Centre	2010–	71	71	12

Last updated: Portugal vs Samoa, 14 November 2026. Statistics include officially capped matches only.

=== Most tries ===
#	Player	Pos	Span	Mat	Pts	Tries
1	Rodrigo Marta	Wing	2018–	51	215	43
2	Raffaele Storti	Wing	2019–	41	150	30
3	Manuel Cardoso Pinto	Fullback	2017–	51	130	26
4	António Aguilar	Wing	1999–2014	83	115	23
4	Gonçalo Foro	Wing	2007–2017	62	115	23
5	Tomás Appleton	Centre	2014–	90	95	19
7	Nuno Durão	Wing	1983–1995	43	94	13
7	Diogo Mateus	Centre	2000–2010	74	65	13
7	Vasco Uva	Number 8	2003–2016	101	65	13
10	Rohan Hoffman	Fullback	1996–2002	26	96	12
10	José Lima	Centre	2010–	71	71	12

Last updated: Portugal vs Samoa, 14 November 2026. Statistics include officially capped matches only.

=== Most points ===
#	Player	Pos	Span	Mat	Pts	Tries	Conv	Pens	Drop
1	Samuel Marques	Scrum-Half	2012–	36	352	6	92	46	0
2	João Queimado	Fly-half	1984–1994	48	269	5	23	55	11
3	Gonçalo Malheiro	Fly-half	1998–2007	41	267	7	23	57	5
4	Pedro Leal	Fullback	2005–2017	77	265	5	42	49	3
5	Rodrigo Marta	Wing	2018–	51	215	43	0	0	0
6	Pedro Cabral	Fly-half	2006–2011	36	184	2	24	37	5
7	Nuno Sousa Guedes	Fullback	2016–	47	156	6	39	16	0
8	Raffaele Storti	Wing	2019–	41	150	30	0	0	0
9	Pedro Bettencourt	Centre	2013–2024	36	130	10	7	22	0
10	José Maria Vilar Gomes	Fullback	1989–2000	33	120	5	10	24	1

Last updated: Portugal vs Samoa, 14 November 2026. Statistics include officially capped matches only.

=== Most points in a match ===
#	Player	Pos	Pts	Tries	Conv	Pens	Drop	Opposition	Venue	Date
1	Thierry Teixeira	Fly-half	30	0	0	9	1	Georgia	(Portugal) Lisbon	08/02/2000
2	José Rodrigues	Fly-Half	26	2	2	4	0	Switzerland	(Portugal) Setúbal	24/02/2018
3	Gonçalo Malheiro	Fullback	25	0	2	5	2	Spain	(Portugal) Coimbra	23/03/2003
3	Jorge Abecasis	Fly-half	25	0	5	5	0	Poland	(Portugal) Setúbal	16/02/2019
3	Raffaele Storti	Wing	25	5	0	0	0	Netherlands	(Netherlands) Amsterdam	10/07/2021
3	Samuel Marques	Scrum-Half	25	1	4	4	0	Belgium	(Belgium) Mons	07/02/2026
7	Gonçalo Malheiro	Fullback	24	2	1	4	0	Czech Republic	(Portugal) Lisbon	08/03/2003
8	Pedro Leal	Fly-half	23	0	1	7	0	Chile	(Chile) Santiago	17/11/2012
9	Pedro Cabral	Fullback	22	1	4	0	3	Czech Republic	(Portugal) Lisbon	16/02/2008
9	Manuel Marta	Fullback	22	2	6	0	0	Czech Republic	(Portugal) Caldas da Rainha	23/03/2019

Last updated: Portugal vs Belgium, 7 February 2026. Statistics include officially capped matches only.

=== Most tries in a match ===
#	Player	Pos	Pts	Tries	Conv	Pens	Drop	Opposition	Venue	Date
1	Raffaele Storti	Wing	25	5	0	0	0	Netherlands	(Netherlands) Amsterdam	10/07/2021
2	Rodrigo Marta	Wing	20	4	0	0	0	Poland	(Poland) Gdynia	11/02/2023
2	Vincent Pinto	Wing	20	4	0	0	0	Poland	(Poland) Gdynia	11/02/2023
4	Nuno Garvão	Wing	15	3	0	0	0	Spain	(Spain) Ibiza	21/03/2004
4	Gonçalo Malheiro	Fly-half	21	3	3	0	0	Barbarians	(Portugal) Lisbon	10/06/2004
4	Gonçalo Foro	Wing	15	3	0	0	0	Germany	(Germany) Heusenstamm	27/02/2010
4	Caetano Castelo Branco	Wing	15	3	0	0	0	Czech Republic	(Portugal) Caldas da Rainha	23/03/2019
4	Antonio Vidinha	Centre	15	3	0	0	0	Czech Republic	(Portugal) Caldas da Rainha	23/03/2019
4	Rodrigo Marta	Wing	15	3	0	0	0	Netherlands	(Netherlands) Amsterdam	10/07/2021
4	Mike Tadjer	Hooker	15	3	0	0	0	Kenya	(United Arab Emirates) Dubai	12/11/2022
4	Hugo Camacho	Scrum-half	15	3	0	0	0	Poland	(Portugal) Lisbon	10/02/2024

Last updated: Portugal vs Ireland, 12 July 2025. Statistics include officially capped matches only.

=== Most matches as captain ===
#	Player	Pos	Span	Mat	Won	Lost	Draw	%	Pts	Tries	Conv	Pens	Drop
1	Tomás Appleton	Centre	2019–2025	47	24	20	3	51.06%	50	10	0	0	0
2	João Correia	Hooker	2008–2014	35	10	23	2	28.57%	10	2	0	0	0
3	Vasco Uva	Flanker	2006–2015	20	5	13	2	25%	20	4	0	0	0
4	Francisco Pinto Magalhães	Scrum-half	2015–2017	12	6	6	0	50%	15	3	0	0	0
5	Luís Pissarra	Scrum-half	2003–2005	10	9	1	0	90%	0	0	0	0	0

Last updated: Portugal vs Hong Kong, 15 November 2025. Statistics include officially capped matches only.

== Notes ==
Awards
Preceded by None	Portuguese Team of the Year; 2007	Succeeded by Portugal national rugby sevens team
