= Frederico Sousa =

Portuguese rugby union player and coach

- Born: 18 August 1978 (age 48) Lisbon
- Height: 1.77 m (5 ft 9 1/2 in)
- Weight: 83 kg (183 lb; 13.1 st)

Rugby union career
- Position: Centre
International career
Years	Team	Apps	(Points)
2000–07	Portugal	47	(20)
Coaching career
- Years: Team
- 2010–23: Portugal

Frederico Abreu Sousa (born Lisbon, 18 August 1978) is a former Portuguese rugby union player and a current high performance director. He played as a centre. His team was Direito.

He was one of the most experienced players for the Portuguese squad, and was a member of his country squad that entered the 2007 Rugby World Cup finals. He played three matches, with Scotland, Italy and Romania. He had 47 caps for his national team, from 2000 to 2007, with 4 tries scored, 20 points in aggregate.

He was the head coach that qualified Portugal Sevens Teams for the World Sevens Séries from 2011 to 2013 and coached Portugal national rugby team from 2013 to 2014 . Sousa has six Rugby’s World Cups (XV, VII)in different role’s : player, coach and high performance director. He also coach representative team Lusitanos XV that compete in the European Challenge Cup since 2013.

Sporting positions
Preceded by (New Zealand) Errol Brain	Portugal National Rugby Union Coach; 2013–2014	Succeeded by (Portugal) João Luís Pinto
