= Rugby union in the Netherlands =

- Country: Netherlands
- Governing body: Rugby Nederland
- National team: Netherlands
- First played: 1879
- Registered players: 24829
- Clubs: 95

Club competitions
- Ereklasse; Eerste Klasse; Tweede Klasse; Derde Klasse; Vierde Klasse

Rugby union in the Netherlands is a popular sport. The sport is governed by the Rugby Nederland, which organizes the Netherlands national rugby union team.

== Governing body ==
The Rugby Nederland was founded on 7 September 1920 but ceased to exist in 1923 due to a lack of clubs. They reorganized on 1 October 1932, as Dutch Rugby Union (Dutch: "Nederlandse Rugby Bond"), two years after the Netherlands national rugby union team played their first match against Belgium. The union is affiliated to the IRB in 1988 and has 15,000 registered players (in 2017).

== History ==
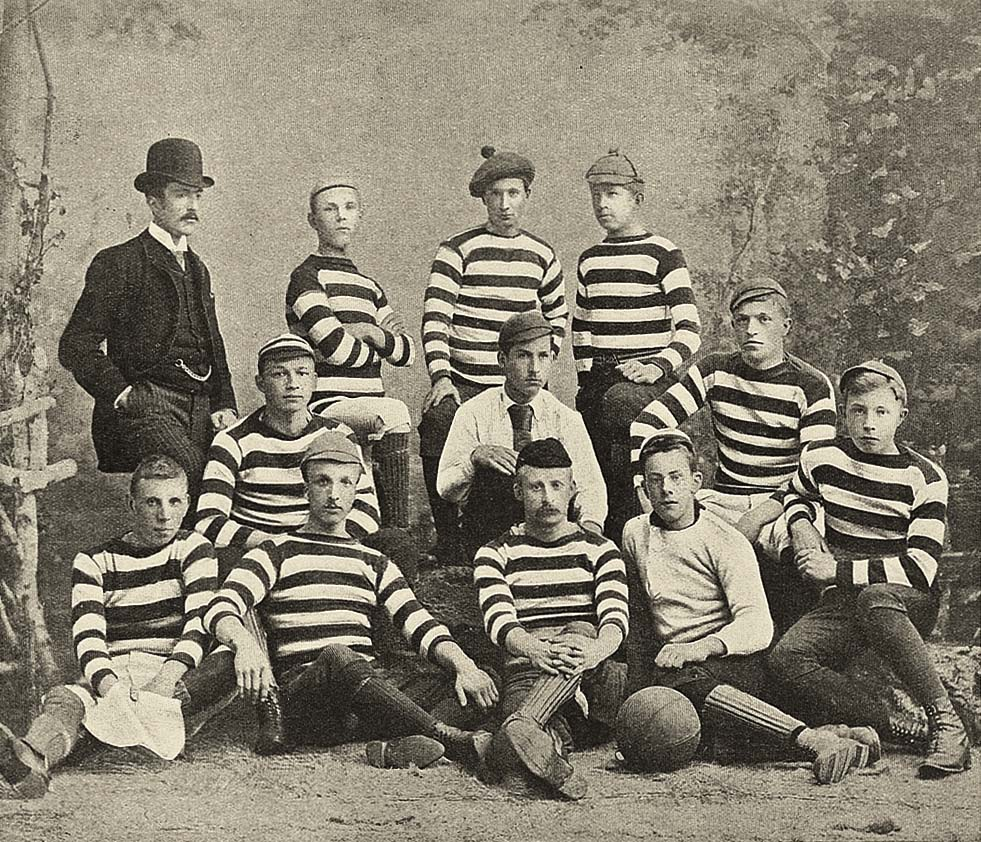
Koninklijke HFC was the first Dutch Rugby club in 1879, but switched to association football in 1883.

The first rugby club was HFC, established on 15 September 1879 by the 14-year-old Pim Mulier, who first encountered the sport in 1870. However, HFC switched to association football in 1883. The Delftsche Studenten Rugby - Club (DSR-C) was the first official rugby club on 24 September 1918.

Dutch rugby started setting down roots in the pre-World War II period. The subsequent German occupation and World War II disrupted its growth, and it took years for the Dutch game to return to its pre-war state. Then in the post-war years, the massive growth and stifling influence of Dutch association football on other sports also hindered further development.

The first Dutch international was in 1932, against Belgium.

Nonetheless, the Netherlands' proximity to the European rugby heartland of the British Isles and France, has ensured a fairly healthy stream of touring sides from these areas. Given the low profile of the game in the Netherlands, Dutch rugby still manages to support over a hundred clubs, and has 7–8,000 players, which is a larger number than some Rugby World Cup entrants.

Women's rugby in the Netherlands started at Rugbyclub Wageningen in 1975. At their first 5-year anniversary the Wageningen rugby men organized a rugby match for the girlfriends against the girlfriends of the befriended Eindhoven Students rugby team The Elephants. The Wageningen women won this game with 4-0 and the seed for Dutch women rugby was planted. It took until 1981 when the first official women rugby competition round was played.

In the 1978–79 season, the Dutch leagues were affected by a severe winter, which prevented teams from playing on grass rugby pitches. Matches were transferred onto beaches to avoid snow and ice.

In 1988, Marcel Bierman, a fly half, broke his neck in the Hong Kong Sevens, and this gave the sport a bad image in the Netherlands at the time.

Dutch rugby received a boost in 1996 when they beat a full-strength team from Moseley RFC.

== Notable Dutch players ==
- Fabian Holland, Dutch lock playing for Otago in New Zealand.
- Tim Visser, player for Dutch club RC Hilversum, Newcastle Falcons and Edinburgh Rugby, and Scotland international.
  - Sep Visser, younger brother of Tim, RC Hilversum and Edinburgh Rugby, and Dutch international.

== See also ==
- Netherlands national rugby union team
- Netherlands women's national rugby union team
- Netherlands national rugby sevens team
- Netherlands women's national rugby sevens team
- RC 't Gooi
