= Evan Crawford (rugby union) =

Evan Crawford is a New Zealand former rugby union player and a current coach.

Crawford started his coach career in his home country, being Rugby Development Manager for NZRU during four years. He was responsible for the entire player and coach development.

He was named as head coach of Portugal in 1999, succeeding João Paulo Bessa and was at the helm of the "Lobos" for 18 months, until September 2001. During this time he increased the results of the Portuguese side, improving his standings in the IRB World ranking from 33 to 15.

He later was Head of Coach Department at the RFU, in Twickenham, England. He then returned to his home country, in 2007, to be the first High Performance Manager at Wellington Rugby Football Union, the first provincial union to make such an appointment.

Sporting positions
Preceded by (Portugal) João Paulo Bessa	Portugal National Rugby Union Coach; 1999–2001	Succeeded by (Portugal) Tomaz Morais
