= João Paulo Bessa =

Portuguese architect, journalist and a former rugby union player and coach

João Paulo de Castro Silva Bessa (born Porto, 25 April 1947) is a Portuguese architect, journalist and a former rugby union player and coach. He also played football and tennis.

== Career ==
Bessa began his Architecture studies at the Escola Superior de Belas-Artes do Porto (ESBAP) and finished it at the Escola Superior de Belas-Artes de Lisboa (ESBAL) in 1973. He first played at CDUP (1965/66-1967/68) but moved then to CDUL (1968/69-1980/81) in Lisbon. He had 5 caps for Portugal, from 1969 to 1974.

After ending his playing career, he became a coach. He was the National Team coach from 1983 to 1986 and from 1994 to 1999. He almost achieved the qualification for the 1999 Rugby World Cup finals, but was eliminated by Uruguay at the repechage.

João Paulo Bessa also has been a sports journalist for many Portuguese newspapers.

Sporting positions
Preceded by (Scotland) Andrew Cushing	Portugal National Rugby Union Coach; 1994–1999	Succeeded by (New Zealand) Evan Crawford
