= João Luís Pinto =

Portuguese rugby union coach

João Luís Pinto is a Portuguese rugby union coach. He was the head coach of Portugal, since 25 July 2014 to 2016.

He has been a coach for the Portuguese Rugby Federation since January 2008. He was the head coach for the U-19 and the U-18 National Teams. Pinto best result was the title of European Champions of the U-19 category in 2012, which granted Portugal qualification for the 2013 IRB Junior World Rugby Trophy, in Chile. Portugal reached the 6th place in the tournament.

He was announced as the new head coach of Portugal at 25 July 2014, replacing Frederico Sousa, after his failure to qualify the "Lobos" for the 2015 Rugby World Cup in England.

Sporting positions
Preceded by (Portugal) Frederico Sousa	Portugal National Rugby Union Coach; 2014–2015	Succeeded by (France) Olivier Baragnon
