= International School of Stavanger =

School in Stavanger, Norway

Coordinates: 58°57′00″N 5°39′16″E

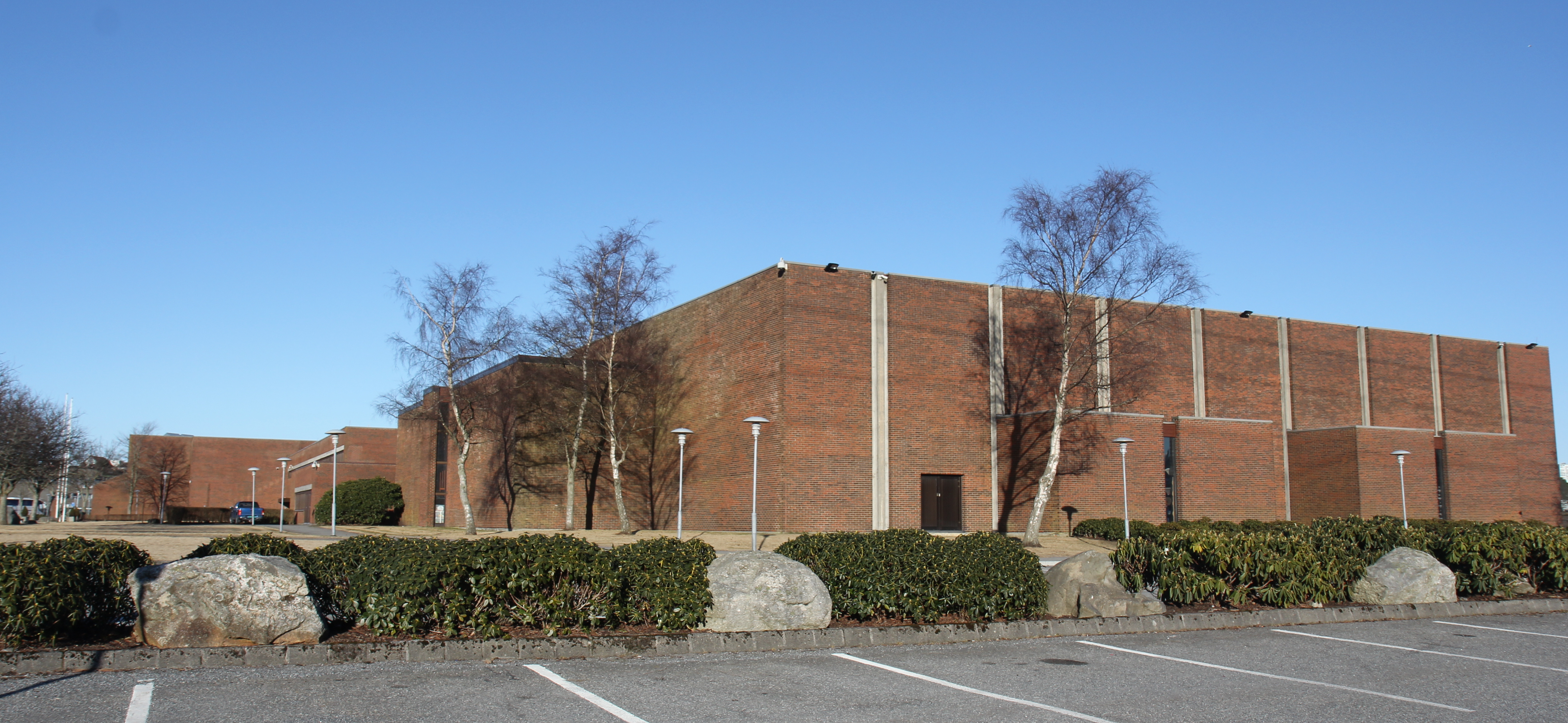
International School of Stavanger

The International School of Stavanger (ISS), previously known as the Stavanger American School (SAMS), has existed in Stavanger since 1966 and at last count was the largest independent school in Norway. They are an English speaking, non-profit international school, educating students from Pre-school through Grade 12. They currently have around 600 students from over 50 countries; this includes 19% Americans; 17% British; and 16% Norwegians, which are their three largest groups. They also have 120 staff from over 20 countries, and seventy-six of the staff are teachers.

They teach two international and transportable curricula, International General Certificate of Secondary Education (IGCSE) and International Baccalaureate (IB). These curricula are for transient international families who are primarily associated with oil companies or NATO, as well as a smaller percentage of local or localized families who wish for an international education in an international school environment. The school often goes in a dip of population because of its reliance on the oil industry. ISS is located on grounds by the local fjord(lake) where the historic Battle of Hafrsfjord occurred. This fjord is right next to a small beach and Sverd i Fjell. The school grounds are very large, with football fields. ISS offers a full program for students that includes academics, as well as many clubs and activities. Their sports teams play against the NECIS family of schools in Europe and their students and staff regularly travel to European destinations.
