= Delta (rugby union) =

(Netherlands) The Delta
- Founded: 2021; 5 years ago
- Location: Amersfoort, Netherlands
- Coach: Allard Jonkers
- League: Rugby Europe Super Cup

Delta is a Dutch professional rugby union team that competes annually in the Rugby Europe Super Cup Western Conference competition along with The Brussels Devils, Lusitanos XV and The Castilla y Leon Iberians.

== History ==
The franchise was created in 2021 to participate in the Rugby Europe Super Cup. The aim of the franchise is to offer top-level matches to Dutch players in the local league. The team plays in Amsterdam. It is coached by Lyn Jones.

== Coaches ==
=== Current coaching staff ===
The current coaching staff for the Delta team:

Name	Nationality	Role
Allard Jonkers	NED	Head coach
Zane Gardiner	NZL	Assistant coach
Matthew Cripps	NED	Assistant coach
Emmanuel Peyrezabes	FRA	Strength & Conditioning coach
Raoul Roelofsen	NED	Physiotherapist

== See also ==
- Netherlands national rugby union team
- Rugby union in the Netherlands
- Rugby Europe Super Cup
