= RC 't Gooi =

Dutch rugby union club, based in Naarden

Rugby Club 't Gooi
- Full name: Rugby Club 't Gooi
- Union: Dutch Rugby Union
- Founded: 1933; 93 years ago
- Location: Naarden, the Netherlands
- Ground(s): Sportpark Naarden, Naarden (Capacity: 1,000)
- Chairman: Rob Houba
- Coach: Johan Hartwigsen
- League: Ereklasse
Team kit

Official website
- www.rugbyclub-gooi.nl

Rugby Club 't Gooi (pronounced [ˈrʏx.bi klʏp ˈt xɔi]) is a Dutch rugby union club located in the town of Naarden. Founded in 1933, it is one of the historical clubs of rugby in the Netherlands. The team currently competes in the Ereklasse, the highest tier of Rugby Nederland. Rugby Club 't Gooi plays at Sportpark Naarden, and their clubhouse, known as "de Poort," serves as a central hub for the team.

The club has a distinguished history, having won the Dutch Championship in the 1951/1952, 2008/2009, 2012/2013, 2017/2018 seasons and are the current Dutch champions having won the 2023/2024 season. With more than 350 members, the club's youth program is especially growing very fast.

== History ==
=== Early history (1933–1943) ===
Henk Kruissink and André Talboo, two young men from Bussum, marked a turning point in the history of rugby in the Netherlands when, in December 1932, they came back excited after watching a film about rugby union at the Tuschinski cinema in Amsterdam.

Although it is not known for sure which film it was, it is likely that they saw a summary of a match between the Springboks vs. England at Twickenham in 1932, which ended with a score of 7-0. Inspired by this film, they decided to create a rugby union team, leading to the foundation of Rugby Club 't Gooi.

Rugby Club 't Gooi was founded on January 14, 1933, following a rugby demonstration match on December 26, 1932, between ARVC Amsterdam and Rapid '04 from Germany. The club's founders, Henk Kruissink and André Talboo, held the first training session on January 28, 1933, at Drafna Lyceum. Initially part of Drafna Sport Club, the rugby division later merged with a team from Hilversum in 1934, forming the Gooische Rugby Club, which would evolve into Rugby Club 't Gooi.

=== Post-war revival and early success (1943–1953) ===
Following the interruption of World War II, the club resumed activities. In the early 1950s, RC 't Gooi won the Dutch national rugby championship.

=== Post-championship era and development (1953–1963) ===
Following their national championship victory in the early 1950s, Rugby Club 't Gooi entered a period of consolidation and growth.

=== Expansion and international engagement (1963–1973) ===
During the period from 1963 to 1973, Rugby Club 't Gooi experienced significant growth and increased international exposure. The club organized its first international trip in the late 1960s, with members traveling to Düsseldorf in either 1967 or 1968.

In addition to on-field activities, club members engaged in various cultural and social endeavors.

=== Consolidation and cultural growth (1973–1983) ===
During the period from 1973 to 1983, Rugby Club 't Gooi focused on strengthening its internal community and promoting rugby culture within the region. In 1978, the club celebrated its 45th anniversary with plans for a grand lustrum event. Chairman Pieter Luteyn emphasized the significance of this celebration, aiming to create an unforgettable experience for members and the broader rugby community.

In 1983, marking the club's 50th anniversary, a comprehensive jubilee book was published.

The club also saw contributions from notable members such as Peter Heerschop, a cabaretier, actor, and writer, who shared his experiences and passion for rugby, enriching the club's cultural tapestry.

=== Competitive success and organizational milestones (1983–1993) ===
In 1983, Rugby Club 't Gooi celebrated its 50th anniversary with the publication of a comprehensive jubilee book. This volume detailed the club's significant events, challenges, and achievements over the previous five decades.

The mid-1980s marked a period of exceptional competitive success for the club. In the 1985–1986 season, Rugby Club 't Gooi achieved a remarkable feat by securing championship titles across three teams: the first, second, and third squads. This accomplishment underscored the club's depth of talent and organizational strength.

In 1993, the Club van 100 was established as a support organization comprising members dedicated to financially assisting various club projects.

=== Modernization and continued growth (1993–2003) ===
During the period from 1993 to 2003, Rugby Club 't Gooi focused on modernizing its facilities and expanding its membership base. In the mid-1990s, the club received a significant contribution from Jacques van der Velden, following the dissolution of RC Leerdam. This support facilitated the enhancement of the club's infrastructure, including the installation of some of the tallest rugby posts in the Netherlands, symbolizing the strong relationship between RC Leerdam and 't Gooi.

=== Renewed success and expansion (2003–2013) ===
During the period from 2003 to 2013, Rugby Club 't Gooi experienced significant growth and success. The club's first team secured the Dutch national championship in the 2008–2009 season, marking a triumphant return to the pinnacle of Dutch rugby. This achievement was replicated in the 2012–2013 season, further solidifying the club's status as a dominant force in the Ereklasse, the highest tier of Rugby Nederland.

In addition to on-field success, the club focused on expanding its membership and enhancing its facilities.

=== Recent achievements and developments (2013–2023) ===
Between 2013 and 2023, Rugby Club 't Gooi continued to build on its legacy of excellence in Dutch rugby. The club's first team clinched the Dutch national championship in the 2017–2018 season, showcasing their sustained competitive prowess. This victory added to their previous titles from the 2008–2009 and 2012–2013 seasons.

In 2023, Rugby Club 't Gooi once again demonstrated their dominance by securing the Dutch national championship, marking their fifth title in the club's storied history.

Throughout this decade, the club has maintained a strong emphasis on youth development and community engagement. The youth program has seen significant growth, contributing to the club's robust membership base and ensuring a steady influx of talent into the senior teams. Additionally, Rugby Club 't Gooi has invested in facility upgrades and community outreach initiatives, reinforcing its position as a cornerstone of rugby in the Netherlands.

== Club Identity ==
=== Club colors and emblem ===
The club initially adopted light blue and dark blue as its colors. However, due to fabric shortages after World War II, the club transitioned to its current royal blue and navy blue combination. Over the years, the club emblem, featuring a lion, has undergone modifications, reflecting the evolving identity of Rugby Club 't Gooi.

=== Newsletter and publications ===
The club's official newsletter, De Scrum, was first published in 1940. It remains a key part of club culture, documenting events, match reports, and member stories. Over the decades, De Scrum has evolved into an important historical record of the club.

== Notable Members ==
One of the club's most influential figures is Dick Bouwman, who began playing for RC 't Gooi in 1946. His contributions to the club’s development have been widely recognized, and interviews with him provide insights into the club’s early years and growth.

== Players currently in Netherlands squad ==
- Hugo Langelaan
- Daniel Workel
- Huey van Vliet
- Jim Boelrijk
- Arno Macken
- Norbecio Mambo
