= RFC Haarlem =

- Full name: Rugby Football Club Haarlem
- Union: Dutch Rugby Union
- Founded: 1 April 1980
- Location: Haarlem, the Netherlands
- Ground(s): Sportpark van der Aart
- Chairman: Pieter Zandhuis
- Coach(es): (New Zealand) Logan Ngatuere-Ongley
Team kit

Rugby Football Club Haarlem is a Dutch rugby club in Haarlem.

== History ==
The club was founded on 1 April 1980 when the clubs Kinheim, from Haarlem and HBC, from Heemstede joined forces.
