= Netherlands national rugby union team =

National rugby union team

Netherlands
- Nickname: Oranje (The Oranges)
- Union: Dutch Rugby Union
- Head coach: Bryan Easson
- Captain: Koen Bloemen
- Most caps: Marc Visser (67)
- Home stadium: NRCA Stadium
First colours	Second colours

World Rugby ranking
- Current: 27 (as of 16 February 2026)
- Highest: 23 (2018)
- Lowest: 48 (2008)

First international
- Netherlands 0–6 Belgium (Amsterdam, Netherlands; 1 July 1930)

Biggest win
- Netherlands 76–0 Switzerland (Amsterdam, Netherlands; 16 February 2025)

Biggest defeat
- England 110–0 Netherlands (Huddersfield, England; 14 November 1998)
- Website: Rugby.nl

The Netherlands national rugby union team, nicknamed The Oranges (Oranje), currently competes in the second division of the Rugby Europe International Championships in the Rugby Europe Trophy, a competition which is just below the Rugby Europe Championship where the top six countries in Europe (apart from the teams in the Six Nations) compete. They are yet to participate in any Rugby World Cup.

== History ==
The Netherlands played their first ever game in 1930, against Belgium on 1 July. The Netherlands played Belgium and Germany as well as Romania. During the 1940s they played regularly against Belgium and Germany. The 1960s saw the side play West Germany regularly as well as other fixtures including matches against Poland, Sweden, Spain and Czechoslovakia. The 1970s saw fixtures played against many teams, notably Scotland XV in October 1978 & Italy. However, they never fully recovered from the floating turn incident.

== Record ==
Men's World Rugby Rankings Top 30 as of 14 September 2026
Rank	Change (Note: Change from the previous week)	Team	Points
1	Steady	South Africa	95.09
2	Steady	New Zealand	91.15
3	Steady	Ireland	88.08
4	Steady	France	87.43
5	Steady	England	85.68
6	Steady	Scotland	84.78
7	Steady	Australia	83.55
8	Steady	Argentina	82.24
9	Steady	Fiji	78.00
10	Steady	Wales	76.38
11	Steady	Italy	76.30
12	Steady	Japan	76.09
13	Steady	Georgia	73.94
14	Steady	United States	69.49
15	Steady	Portugal	69.39
16	Steady	Chile	66.94
17	Steady	Spain	66.83
18	Steady	Uruguay	65.75
19	Steady	Tonga	65.14
20	Steady	Samoa	64.73
21	Steady	Romania	62.45
22	Steady	Belgium	61.03
23	Steady	Hong Kong	60.74
24	Steady	Canada	60.37
25	Steady	Zimbabwe	57.68
26	Steady	Namibia	56.96
27	Steady	Netherlands	56.44
28	Steady	Switzerland	55.47
29	Steady	Czech Republic	54.78
30	Steady	Poland	54.54

Netherlands's historical rankings

Source: World Rugby
Graph updated to 24 August 2026

Below is a table of the representative rugby matches played by a Netherlands national XV at test level up until 16 November 2024, updated after match with Chile.

Opponents	Matches	Won	Draw	Lost	For	Aga	Diff	Win%
Andorra	3	3	0	0	140	116	+24	100%
Belgium	45	20	4	21	475	539	–64	44.44%
Bulgaria	1	1	0	0	45	10	+35	100%
Chile	1	1	0	0	20	17	+3	100%
Croatia	2	2	0	0	47	19	+28	100%
Czech Republic	5	3	0	2	136	91	+45	60%
Czechoslovakia	7	2	0	5	88	99	–11	28.57%
Denmark	10	9	0	1	311	57	+254	90%
East Germany	2	1	0	1	20	35	–15	50%
England	1	0	0	1	0	110	–110	0%
Georgia	8	1	0	7	107	355	–248	12.5%
Germany	18	10	0	8	342	290	+52	55.56%
Hong Kong	1	1	0	0	25	10	+15	50%
Israel	1	1	0	0	56	0	+56	100%
Italy	4	0	0	4	27	178	–151	0%
Emerging Italy	1	0	0	1	5	50	-45	0%
Japan	1	1	0	0	15	13	+2	100%
Latvia	3	3	0	0	134	23	+11	100%
Lithuania	3	2	0	1	90	34	+56	66.67%
Malta	1	1	0	0	27	9	+18	100%
Morocco	7	3	0	4	88	111	–23	42.86%
Moldova	3	1	0	2	77	85	–8	33.33%
Poland	21	8	2	11	334	324	+10	38.1%
Portugal	14	1	3	10	172	349	–177	7.14%
Romania	10	0	1	9	76	393	–317	0%
Russia	5	0	0	5	47	243	–169	0%
Spain	18	0	1	17	152	537	–385	0%
South Korea	2	1	0	1	45	108	–63	50%
Sweden	19	18	0	1	444	186	+258	94.74%
Switzerland	2	2	0	0	47	22	+25	100%
Tunisia	5	4	0	1	86	53	+33	80%
Ukraine	4	1	0	3	71	88	–17	25%
Uganda	1	1	0	0	42	0	+42	100%
Yugoslavia	6	4	0	2	93	40	+53	66.67%
West Germany	28	9	1	18	279	481	–202	32.14%
Zimbabwe	1	0	0	1	7	30	–23	0%
Total	263	115	13	135	4158	5025	–867	43.73%

== Current squad ==
On 22 January 2025, the following 49 players were called up for the 2025 Rugby Europe Championship.

Head Coach: (Scotland) Bryan Easson

- Caps Updated: 23 January 2021

Note: Flags indicate national union for the club/province as defined by World Rugby.

Player	Position	Date of birth (age)	Caps	Club/province
Ross Bennie-Coulson	Hooker	18 October 2000 (age 25)	16	(Netherlands) DIOK *
Mark Darlington	Hooker	23 May 1985 (age 41)	23	(England) Maidenhead
Lars Linnenbank	Hooker	28 November 1997 (age 28)	1	(Netherlands) Dukes *
Mike Mbaud	Hooker	14 December 1999 (age 26)	3	(England) Ealing Trailfinders
David Anderson	Prop	4 August 1995 (age 31)	1	(Netherlands) Haagsche
Lodi Buijs	Prop	19 October 2000 (age 25)	10	(Netherlands) Haagsche *
Andrew Darlington	Prop	6 January 1989 (age 37)	26	(France) Beaune
Kieran Hogg	Prop	27 December 1999 (age 26)	6	Unattached
Hugo Langelaan	Prop	27 March 1990 (age 36)	31	(Netherlands) Eemland *
Robin Moenen	Prop	28 November 1995 (age 30)	12	(Netherlands) DIOK *
Mink Scharink	Prop	12 July 2000 (age 26)	0	(England) Saracens
Jake Stamenković	Prop	3 October 1999 (age 26)	4	(Netherlands) DIOK
Koen Bloemen	Lock	13 May 1998 (age 28)	7	(France) Bourg-en-Bresse
Jim Boelrijk	Lock	6 February 1994 (age 32)	10	(Netherlands) ‘t Gooi *
Louis Bruinsma	Lock	15 July 2000 (age 26)	2	(France) Stade Montois
Dennis van Dijken	Lock	25 August 1999 (age 27)	1	(France) Graulhet
Marijn Huis	Lock	28 November 1999 (age 26)	3	(England) Durham University
Christopher van Leeuwen	Lock	26 April 1995 (age 31)	2	(France) Suresnes
Jade Plane	Lock	18 February 2001 (age 25)	0	(France) Oyonnax
Dirk Danen	Back row	21 April 1989 (age 37)	31	(Netherlands) Hilversum *
Wolf van Dijk	Back row	2 December 1999 (age 26)	10	(Netherlands) DIOK
Guy van den Dries	Back row	28 September 1993 (age 33)	1	(England) Belsize Park
Dave Koelman	Back row	16 January 2001 (age 25)	2	(Netherlands) Castricum
Kevin Krieger	Back row	11 September 1998 (age 28)	12	(Netherlands) Haagsche
Blake Nightingale	Back row	2 May 1992 (age 34)	10	(Netherlands) ‘t Gooi *
Christopher Raymond	Back row	16 December 2000 (age 25)	2	(Netherlands) Haarlem *
Liam Stone	Back row	1 October 2000 (age 25)	0	(England) Coventry
Niels van de Ven	Back row	20 April 1992 (age 34)	5	(Spain) Alcobendas
Maxou Zerdoun	Back row	13 October 2000 (age 25)	1	(Netherlands) Haagsche *
Mark Coebergh	Scrum-half	27 March 1998 (age 28)	1	(Netherlands) ‘t Gooi *
Caleb Korteweg	Scrum-half	1 January 1997 (age 29)	0	(Scotland) Stirling County
Hugo Schöller	Scrum-half	11 March 1999 (age 27)	6	(France) Coq Léguevinois
Marc Mistou	Fly-half	28 September 1998 (age 28)	2	(Netherlands) ‘t Gooi *
Mees van Oord	Fly-half	27 April 1999 (age 27)	9	(Netherlands) DIOK *
Reinhardt Fortuin	Fly-half	30 January 1996 (age 30)	2	(South Africa) Cheetahs
Willie du Plessis	Fly-half	5 June 1990 (age 36)	0	(France) Stade Montois
Storm Carroll	Centre	13 November 1984 (age 41)	27	(Netherlands) Haarlem
Jules Godfroy	Centre	14 January 1997 (age 29)	0	(France) Corrèze
Tyren Kroos	Centre	14 February 2000 (age 26)	0	(France) Agen
Daily Limmen	Centre	22 June 2001 (age 25)	4	(Netherlands) Castricum *
Oliva Sialau	Centre	1 March 1994 (age 32)	3	(Netherlands) Dukes *
David Weersma	Centre	9 April 1996 (age 30)	15	(Spain) Aparejadores
Daan van der Avoird	Wing	28 November 2000 (age 25)	4	(Netherlands) DIOK *
Jort Doornenbal	Wing	3 August 2000 (age 26)	1	(Netherlands) Castricum *
Jordy Hop	Wing	16 August 1994 (age 32)	8	(Netherlands) Haagsche
Reinier Pieters	Wing	28 November 1996 (age 29)	3	(Switzerland) Servette **
Bart Wierenga	Wing	26 August 1999 (age 27)	4	(France) Valence Romans
Te Hauora Campbell	Fullback	29 June 2000 (age 26)	6	(Netherlands) ‘t Gooi *
Peter Lydon	Fullback	19 October 1992 (age 33)	0	(France) Rouen

- *: Also a member of Delta squad, playing in the Rugby Europe Super Cup.
- **: Servette is a Swiss club but plays in the French league.

=== Call-ups ===
On 10 February Spike Salman of Racing 92 was called up to the squad.

== Current coaching staff ==
The current coaching staff of the Netherlands national team:

Name	Nationality	Role
Bryan Easson	SCO	Head coach
Gareth Gilbert	RSA	Assistant coach
Allard Jonkers	NED	Assistant coach
Emmanuel Peyrezabes	FRA	Strength and Conditioning coach
Antoine van den Berg	NED	Physiotherapist
Sebastiaan van Osch	NED	Physiotherapist
Kevan Gallagher	NED	Video analyst
Jan van Diest	NED	Manager

=== Past Coaches ===
Since 1997

Years	Coach
1997–2000	(New Zealand) Geoff Old
2001–2004	(Scotland) Robbie Allen
2004	(New Zealand) Alex O'Dowd
2005–2006	(England) Iain Krysztofiak
2007	(Netherlands) Eric Hangeveld
2008	(France) Robin Raphael
2009	(Netherlands) Hugues Dispas
2009	(France) Robin Raphael (Caretaker)
2009–2010	(Netherlands) Hugues Dispas
2010–2011	(France) Jean Bidal
2011	(Netherlands) Silvester Ramaker
2011–2016	(Australia) Alex Chang
2016–2019	(South Africa) Gareth Gilbert
2019–2022	(New Zealand) Zane Gardiner
2022	(South Africa) Dick Muir (interim)
2022–2025	(Wales) Lyn Jones
2025–present	(Scotland) Bryan Easson

== See also ==
- Rugby union in the Netherlands
- Dutch Rugby Union
- Netherlands women's national rugby union team
- Netherlands national under-20 rugby union team
- Netherlands national rugby sevens team
- Netherlands women's national rugby sevens team
- Sport in Netherlands
