= Stade Charles Tondreau =

Football stadium in Mons, Belgium

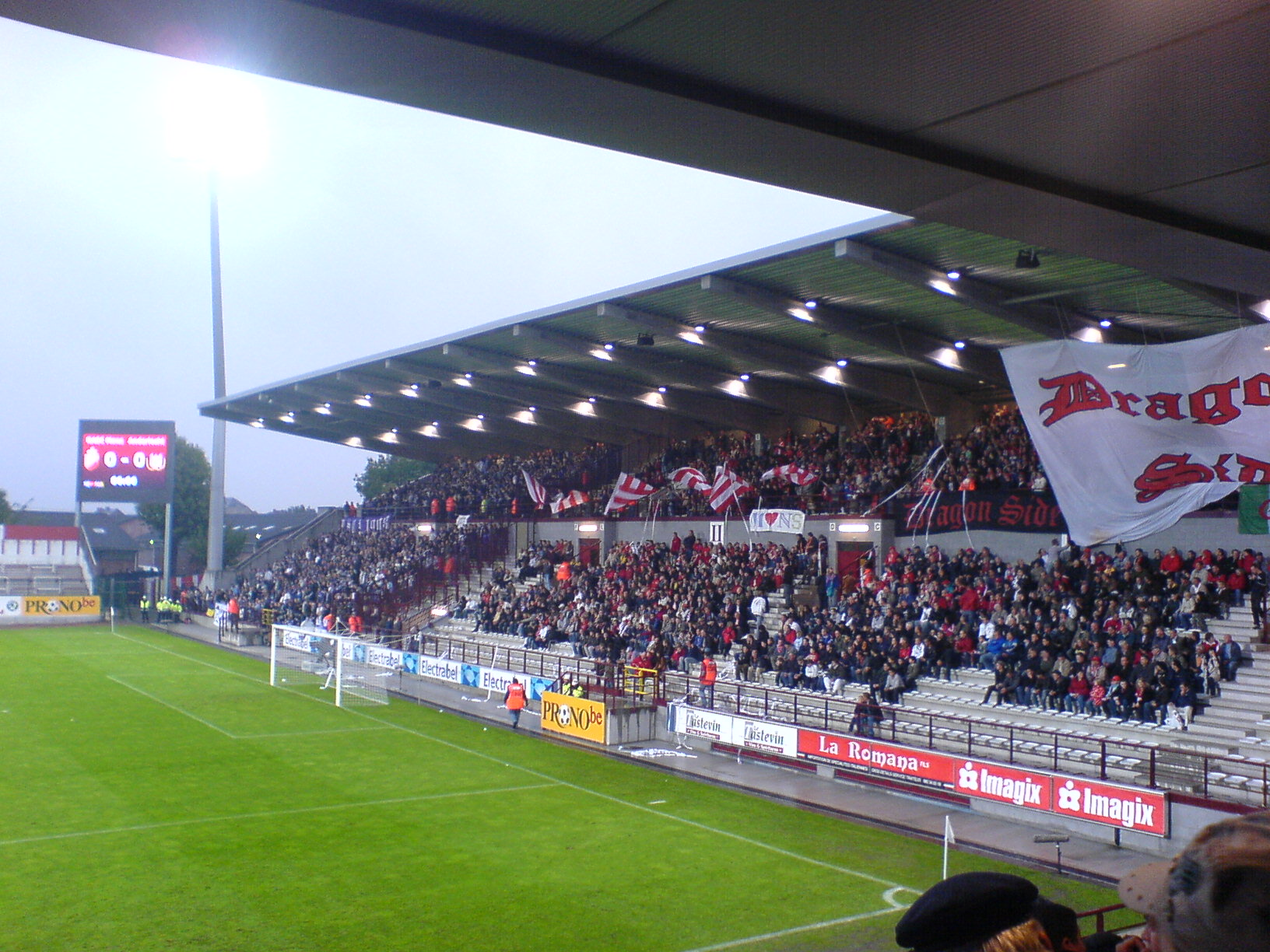
- Interactive map of Stade Charles Tondreau
- Location: Avenue du Tir,80; 7000 Mons, Belgium
- Coordinates: 50°27′43″N 3°57′50″E
- Capacity: 6,000
- Surface: Grass

Construction
- Opened: 25 September 1910

Tenants
- R.A.E.C. Mons; Belgium national rugby team

The Stade Charles Tondreau (French pronunciation: [stad ʃaʁl tɔ̃dʁo]) is a multi-purpose stadium in Mons, Belgium. It is currently used mostly for football matches and is the home ground of R.A.E.C. Mons. The stadium also hosts home matches for the Belgium national rugby union team in the Rugby Europe International Championship.

The stadium holds 6,000.
