= Dutch Rugby Union =

Rugby union governing body in the Netherlands

Nederlandse Rugby Bond
- Sport: Rugby union
- Founded: 1932; 94 years ago
- World Rugby affiliation: 1988
- Rugby Europe affiliation: 1934
- President: (Netherlands) Jan-Hein Pieterse
- Men's coach: (New Zealand) Zane Gardiner
- Women's coach: (Netherlands) Sylke Haverkorn
- Website: www.rugby.nl

The Dutch Rugby Union (Dutch: Rugby Nederland) is the governing body for rugby union in the Netherlands. It was founded in 1932 and became affiliated to the International Rugby Football Board, in 1988 known as the International Rugby Board and now as World Rugby. Netherlands Men's Rugby are ranked 25th (on 12 October 2019) in the world according to World Rugby.

== See also ==
- Netherlands national rugby union team
- Netherlands national U20 rugby union team
- Netherlands national rugby sevens team
- Netherlands women's national rugby union team
- Netherlands women's national rugby sevens team
- Ereklasse
