= 2016 end-of-year rugby union internationals =

The 2016 end-of-year rugby union internationals, also known as the 2016 Autumn Internationals in the Northern Hemisphere, were a series of international rugby union matches predominantly played between the visiting Southern Hemisphere countries: Argentina, Australia, New Zealand and South Africa – and the European sides: England, France, Ireland, Italy, Scotland and Wales.

The 2016 November international window saw 37 international matches take place, with an additional seven international matches taking place outside the allocated three-week window. 27 nations across all three tiers competed in at least one test, with a record 27 matches including a tier 2 or tier 3 side, seven of which were a tier 1 v tier 2 fixture, as World Rugby tried to build on the tier 2 success in the 2015 Rugby World Cup, moving towards the 2019 Rugby World Cup. Coinciding with the international window, the 2016 Cup of Nations took place, bringing the total number of matches up to 51 for 31 nations. Australia attempted their first Grand Slam tour of the Home Nations since 2013. It was their tenth attempt at a Grand Slam, which they have achieved on only one occasion, in 1984. Australia were unsuccessful in their Grand Slam attempt, losing to both Ireland and England. In addition to their Grand Slam tour, Australia also played France before playing the French Barbarians for the first time since 2005. World Champions New Zealand played Ireland twice, one of which was played at the historic Soldier Field stadium in Chicago, the venue having previously hosted tests between the Eagles, All Blacks, and Wallabies in 2014 and 2015. The game gave Ireland their first victory over New Zealand at the 29th attempt, in a rivalry dating back to 1905. The other Ireland v New Zealand test took place in Ireland as part of the All Blacks' European tour, which also saw them play Italy and France. England and Wales both played host to Argentina and South Africa, while the Pumas and Springboks also travelled to Scotland and Italy, respectively. As in recent seasons, New Zealand and Australia played the third and final Bledisloe Cup Test match for the year, with New Zealand having already secured the cup 2–0 during the 2016 Rugby Championship.

== Tier 2 teams ==
Unlike previous November tests, World Rugby has given more tier 2 nations a tier 1 fixture, seeing not only the touring Pacific Island nations Fiji, Samoa and Tonga compete against a top side, but also Canada, Georgia and Japan. Fiji will play England, France will host Samoa, while Italy will host Tonga. Ireland will play host to Canada in what will be Canada's first visit to Ireland, and a tier 1 nation (excluding World Cup years), since November 2008. Georgia will visit Scotland for the first-ever time, playing just their second ever test against each other, the first outside a Rugby World Cup. It will be the first time since November 2014 that Georgia has played a tier 1 test, excluding their 2015 World Cup games against Argentina and New Zealand. Japan will play host to Argentina for the first time since 1998, in what will be the first test between the two nations since 2005, before Japan travels to Wales for the first time since 2007. It will be their first encounter against each other since June 2013, when Japan earned their first ever victory over the Welsh.

Following a reduced 2016 World Rugby Pacific Nations Cup to include just the Pacific nations, World Rugby organized intercontinental matches between the Pacific Islanders, North America and Japan at neutral venues in Europe; Fiji will play Japan, and Samoa will play Canada in France, while Tonga will play the United States in Spain. In addition to these tests, Japan and Samoa will be hosted by Georgia, while both Canada and the United States will travel to Romania. Uruguay will play their first ever 3-test European tour having secured tier 2 status. They will visit Spain for the first time since 2011 and Romania in a first ever one-off test outside any tournament. They will also play Germany in what will be the first ever meeting between the two sides. It will also be a first meeting for Spain and Tonga when they play each other in Madrid. In Belgium's only test, they will travel to Portugal in what will be the team's first one-off test outside any tournament.

== Tier 3 and invitational teams ==
As part of World Rugby's strategy to provide increasing support to cross-regional international competition, Brazil embarked on their first-ever European tour, playing a two-test series against Germany, in what was Germany's first-ever home test against Brazil, and their first non-European opponent at home since Hong Kong in 2010. It was the first time since the 2011 Cup of Nations that Brazil has left the Americas region for a test match. Furthermore, Portugal played host to the Brazilians for the first-ever time, having already played in Brazil in November 2013. In addition to Brazil's historic tour, Chile played host to their first-ever Asian team when South Korea plays a two-test series against Los Condores. It was the first time that South Korea has left the Asian region for a test match since playing Tonga in 2007, and their first non-qualifying test match since playing Australia in 1987.

Several invitational teams were in action during the window, where the Barbarians played three national sides: South Africa, competing for the Killik Cup, Fiji and Czech Republic. The Czech Republic were the first team outside the elite 20 nations since Belgium in May 2008. It will serve as a celebration match for the 90th anniversary of the Czech Rugby Union. The Māori All Blacks toured for the first time since 2014, playing the United States in Chicago, in a match that was part of 'The Rugby Weekend,' doubling up with the Ireland–New Zealand game the same weekend. The Māori All Blacks later travelled to Europe, playing Irish side Munster in Limerick and English side Harlequins in London.

== Fixtures ==
22 October 2016
19:35 NZST (UTC+12)

New Zealand	37–10	Australia
Try: Dagg 5' m Lienert-Brown 9' m Perenara 33' m J. Savea (2) 53' c, 68' c Coles 72' m Con: Cruden (2/3) 54', 69'; Pen: Cruden (1/1) 64'	Report	Try: Arnold 28' c Con: Foley (1/1) 29'; Pen: Foley (1/3) 42'

Eden Park, Auckland
Attendance: 47,744
Referee: Nigel Owens (Wales)

Team details

FB	15	Ben Smith
RW	14	Israel Dagg
OC	13	Anton Lienert-Brown	(substituted off) 61'
IC	12	Ryan Crotty
LW	11	Julian Savea
FH	10	Beauden Barrett	(substituted off) 44'
SH	9	TJ Perenara	(substituted off) 61'
N8	8	Kieran Read (c)
OF	7	Matt Todd	(substituted off) 64'
BF	6	Jerome Kaino	(substituted off) 51'	(substituted on) 79'
RL	5	Sam Whitelock
LL	4	Brodie Retallick		(substituted off) 79'
TP	3	Owen Franks	(substituted off) 51'
HK	2	Dane Coles	(substituted off) 73'
LP	1	Joe Moody	(substituted off) 51'
Replacements:
HK	16	Codie Taylor	(substituted on) 73'
PR	17	Wyatt Crockett	(substituted on) 51'
PR	18	Charlie Faumuina	(substituted on) 51'
FL	19	Liam Squire	(substituted on) 51'
FL	20	Ardie Savea	(substituted on) 64'
SH	21	Tawera Kerr-Barlow	(substituted on) 61'
FH	22	Aaron Cruden	(substituted on) 44'
CE	23	Malakai Fekitoa	(substituted on) 61'
Coach:
(New Zealand) Steve Hansen

FB	15	Israel Folau
RW	14	Dane Haylett-Petty
OC	13	Samu Kerevi	(substituted off) 23'
IC	12	Reece Hodge
LW	11	Henry Speight	(substituted off) 74'
FH	10	Bernard Foley
SH	9	Nick Phipps	(substituted off) 61'
N8	8	Lopeti Timani	(substituted off) 55'
OF	7	Michael Hooper
BF	6	Dean Mumm
RL	5	Adam Coleman
LL	4	Rory Arnold	(substituted off) 48'
TP	3	Sekope Kepu	(substituted off) 61'
HK	2	Stephen Moore (c)	(substituted off) 74'
LP	1	Scott Sio	(substituted off) 64'
Replacements:
HK	16	James Hanson	(substituted on) 74'
PR	17	Tom Robertson	(substituted on) 64'
PR	18	Allan Alaalatoa	(substituted on) 61'
LK	19	Rob Simmons	(substituted on) 48'
FL	20	David Pocock	(substituted on) 55'
SH	21	Nick Frisby	(substituted on) 61'
FH	22	Quade Cooper	(substituted on) 74'
WG	23	Sefa Naivalu	(substituted on) 23'
Coach:
(Australia) Michael Cheika

Man of the Match:
Matt Todd (New Zealand)

Touch judges:
Craig Joubert (South Africa)
Marius van der Westhuizen (South Africa)
Television match official:
Shaun Veldsman (South Africa)

4 November 2016
19:00 CDT (UTC-05)

United States	7–54	Māori All Blacks
Try: Clever 48' c Con: Holder (1/1) 49'	Report	Try: Lowe (2) 11' c, 34' c A. Ioane (2) 19' c, 45' c A. Dixon 40' c Hames 51' c Weber 63' m Royal 78' c Con: West (6/6) 12', 19', 35', 40', 46', 51'; D. McKenzie (1/1) 79'

Toyota Park, Bridgeview, Illinois
Attendance: 12,000
Referee: Matthew Carley (England)

Team details

FB	15	Mike Te'o		(substituted off) 63'
RW	14	Martin Iosefo
OC	13	Bryce Campbell
IC	12	Folau Niua
LW	11	Matai Leuta
FH	10	Will Holder		(substituted off) 63'
SH	9	Nate Augspurger		(substituted off) 65'
N8	8	Danny Barrett
OF	7	Tony Lamborn		(substituted off) 55'
BF	6	Todd Clever (c)
RL	5	Nick Civetta
LL	4	Nate Brakeley		(substituted off) 61'
TP	3	Chris Baumann		(substituted off) 63'
HK	2	James Hilterbrand	(yellow card) 38' to 48'	(substituted off) 71'
LP	1	Titi Lamositele		(substituted off) 48'
Replacements:
HK	16	Pat Blair		(substituted on) 71'
PR	17	Joe Taufete'e		(substituted on) 48'
PR	18	Angus MacLellan		(substituted on) 63'
LK	19	Matthew Jensen		(substituted on) 61'
FL	20	Alastair McFarland		(substituted on) 55'
SH	21	Stephen Tomasin		(substituted on) 65'
FH	22	Shalom Suniula		(substituted on) 63'
FB	23	Madison Hughes		(substituted on) 63'
Coach:
(New Zealand) John Mitchell

FB	15	Damian McKenzie
RW	14	Rieko Ioane
OC	13	Matt Proctor
IC	12	Tim Bateman
LW	11	James Lowe
FH	10	Ihaia West		(substituted off) 58'
SH	9	Tawera Kerr-Barlow		(substituted off) 62'
N8	8	Akira Ioane
OF	7	Kara Pryor		(substituted off) 54'
BF	6	Elliot Dixon
RL	5	Tom Franklin		(substituted off) 70'
LL	4	Jacob Skeen		(substituted off) 54'
TP	3	Ben May		(substituted off) 61'
HK	2	Ash Dixon (c)		(substituted off) 65'
LP	1	Kane Hames		(substituted off) 61'
Replacements:
HK	16	Joe Royal		(substituted on) 65'
PR	17	Chris Eves		(substituted on) 61'
PR	18	Marcel Renata		(substituted on) 61'
LK	19	Leighton Price		(substituted on) 54'
FL	20	Shane Christie		(substituted on) 54'
SH	21	Brad Weber	(yellow card) 71' to 80'	(substituted on) 62'
FB	22	Marty McKenzie		(substituted on) 58'
CE	23	Sean Wainui		(substituted on) 70'
Coach:
(New Zealand) Colin Cooper

Man of the Match:
Akira Ioane (Māori All Blacks)

Touch judges:
USA Appt. (United States)
USA Appt. (United States)
Television match official:
Rowan Kitt (England)

5 November 2016
14:40 JST (UTC+9)

Japan	20–54	Argentina
Try: Mafi 52' c Lemeki 79' c Con: Tamura (2/2) 52', 80'; Pen: Tamura (2/2) 5', 22'	Report	Try: Moroni (2) 13' m, 49' c Sánchez (2) 36' c, 62' m Cordero (2) 42' c, 65' c Cubelli 74' c Con: Sánchez (5/7) 36', 43', 49', 65', 75'; Pen: Sánchez (3/3) 18', 30', 39'

Chichibunomiya Rugby Stadium, Tokyo
Attendance: 18,397
Referee: Romain Poite (France)

Team details

FB	15	Kotaro Matsushima
RW	14	Lomano Lemeki
OC	13	Amanaki Lotoahea	(substituted off) 60'
IC	12	Harumichi Tatekawa
LW	11	Akihito Yamada
FH	10	Yu Tamura
SH	9	Fumiaki Tanaka	(substituted off) 71'
N8	8	Amanaki Mafi
OF	7	Yuhimaru Mimura	(substituted off) 50'
BF	6	Uwe Helu	(substituted off) 40'
RL	5	Samuela Anise	(substituted off) 40'
LL	4	Kyosuke Kajikawa
TP	3	Kensuke Hatakeyama	(substituted off) 40'
HK	2	Shota Horie (c)	(substituted off) 49'
LP	1	Satoshi Nakatani	(substituted off) 60'
Replacements:
HK	16	Takeshi Kizu	(substituted on) 49'
PR	17	Koki Yamamoto	(substituted on) 60'
PR	18	Heiichiro Ito	(substituted on) 40'
LK	19	Kotaro Yatabe	(substituted on) 40'
FL	20	Malgene Ilaua	(substituted on) 40'
FL	21	Shuhei Matsuhashi	(substituted on) 50'
SH	22	Takahiro Ogawa	(substituted on) 71'
FH	23	Timothy Lafaele	(substituted on) 60'
Coach:
(New Zealand) Jamie Joseph

FB	15	Joaquín Tuculet	(substituted off) 50'
RW	14	Matías Moroni
OC	13	Matías Orlando
IC	12	Jerónimo de la Fuente	(substituted off) 63'
LW	11	Santiago Cordero
FH	10	Nicolás Sánchez
SH	9	Martín Landajo	(substituted off) 53'
N8	8	Facundo Isa	(substituted off) 50'
OF	7	Javier Ortega Desio
BF	6	Tomás Lezana
RL	5	Matías Alemanno
LL	4	Guido Petti	5' to 14'		(substituted off) 57'
TP	3	Ramiro Herrera	(substituted off) 53'
HK	2	Agustín Creevy (c)	(substituted off) 52'
LP	1	Lucas Noguera Paz	(substituted off) 66'
Replacements:
HK	16	Julián Montoya	(substituted on) 52'
PR	17	Santiago García Botta	(substituted on) 66'
PR	18	Enrique Pieretto	(substituted on) 53'
N8	19	Leonardo Senatore	(substituted on) 50'
FL	20	Juan Manuel Leguizamón	(substituted on) 5'	(substituted off) 14'	(substituted on) 57'
SH	21	Tomás Cubelli	(substituted on) 53'
FH	22	Santiago González Iglesias	(substituted on) 63'
WG	23	Ramiro Moyano	(substituted on) 50'
Coach:
(Argentina) Daniel Hourcade

Man of the Match:
Nicolás Sánchez (Argentina)

Touch judges:
Craig Maxwell-Keys (England)
Tim Baker (Hong Kong)
Television match official:
Peter Fitzgibbon (Ireland)

Notes:

- Samuela Anise, Uwe Helu, Kyosuke Kajikawa, Malgene Ilaua, Heiichiro Ito, Timothy Lafaele, Lomano Lemeki, Amanaki Lotoahea, Shuhei Matsuhashi, Yuhimaru Mimura, Satoshi Nakatani, Takahiro Ogawa and Koki Yamamoto (all Japan) made their international debuts.
- This was Argentina's largest winning margin over Japan, surpassing the 32 point margin set in 2005, while scoring their most points against Japan.
- This was Argentina's first ever win in Japan.

5 November 2016
14:00 CET (UTC+1)

Montenegro	7–55	Gibraltar

Tivat Arsenal Stadium

5 November 2016
14:30 GMT (UTC+0)

Wales	8−32	Australia
Try: S. Williams 61' m Pen: Halfpenny (1/2) 6'	Report	Try: Moore 10' m Hodge 26' m Kuridrani 34' c Foley 56' m Haylett-Petty 75'; Con: Foley (2/5) 36' 76'; Pen: Foley (1/1) 4'

Millennium Stadium, Cardiff
Attendance: 55,776
Referee: Craig Joubert (South Africa)

Team details

FB	15	Leigh Halfpenny
RW	14	Alex Cuthbert
OC	13	Scott Williams
IC	12	Jamie Roberts
LW	11	George North		(substituted off) 60'
FH	10	Dan Biggar	(yellow card) 15' to 25'	(substituted off) 64'
SH	9	Rhys Webb		(substituted off) 64'
N8	8	Ross Moriarty
OF	7	Justin Tipuric
BF	6	Dan Lydiate		(substituted off) 68'
RL	5	Luke Charteris
LL	4	Bradley Davies		(substituted off) 63'
TP	3	Samson Lee		(substituted off) 58'
HK	2	Ken Owens		(substituted off) 58'
LP	1	Gethin Jenkins (c)		(substituted off) 58'
Replacements:
HK	16	Scott Baldwin		(substituted on) 58'
PR	17	Nicky Smith		(substituted on) 58'
PR	18	Tomas Francis		(substituted on) 58'
LK	19	Cory Hill		(substituted on) 63'
FL	20	James King		(substituted on) 68'
SH	21	Gareth Davies		(substituted on) 64'
FH	22	Sam Davies		(substituted on) 64'
WG	23	Hallam Amos		(substituted on) 60'
Coach:
(Wales) Rob Howley

FB	15	Israel Folau
RW	14	Dane Haylett-Petty
OC	13	Tevita Kuridrani
IC	12	Reece Hodge
LW	11	Henry Speight	(substituted off) 76'
FH	10	Bernard Foley	(substituted off) 76'
SH	9	Nick Phipps	(substituted off) 66'
N8	8	Lopeti Timani
OF	7	Michael Hooper
BF	6	David Pocock	(substituted off) 40'
RL	5	Adam Coleman		(substituted off) 74'
LL	4	Rory Arnold	(substituted off) 63'	(substituted on) 74'
TP	3	Sekope Kepu	(substituted off) 63'
HK	2	Stephen Moore (c)	(substituted off) 76'
LP	1	Scott Sio	(substituted off) 67'
Replacements:
HK	16	Tolu Latu	(substituted on) 76'
PR	17	James Slipper	(substituted on) 67'
PR	18	Allan Alaalatoa	(substituted on) 63'
LK	19	Rob Simmons	(substituted on) 63'
FL	20	Scott Fardy	(substituted on) 40'
SH	21	Nick Frisby	(substituted on) 66'
FH	22	Quade Cooper	(substituted on) 76'
WG	23	Sefa Naivalu	(substituted on) 76'
Coach:
(Australia) Michael Cheika

Man of the Match:
Bernard Foley (Australia)

Touch judges:
Jérôme Garcès (France)
Federico Anselmi (Argentina)
Television match official:
Simon McDowell (Ireland)

Notes:

- Sam Davies and Cory Hill (both Wales) and Tolu Latu (Australia) made their international debuts.
- This was Wales's largest home defeat since 2006, when New Zealand beat them 46–10.
- Australia retain the James Bevan Trophy.

5 November 2016
15:30 GMT (UTC+0)

Barbarians	31−31	South Africa
Try: Nanai 4' m Ellis 18' c Naiyaravoro 39' m Morahan (2) 54' c, 67' c Con: Du Preez (1/3) 19'; Mo'unga (2/2) 55', 68'	Report	Try: Du Toit 11' m Smit 23' c Petersen 43' c Venter 70' c Van Rensburg 76' m Con: Lambie (3/5) 24', 44', 71'

Wembley Stadium, London
Attendance: 46,646
Referee: Mike Fraser (New Zealand)

Team details

FB	15	(Samoa) Melani Nanai
RW	14	(New Zealand) Matt Faddes	(substituted off) 51'
OC	13	(New Zealand) Seta Tamanivalu
IC	12	(New Zealand) Richard Buckman
LW	11	(Australia) Taqele Naiyaravoro
FH	10	(South Africa) Robert du Preez	(substituted off) 51'
SH	9	(New Zealand) Andrew Ellis (c)	(substituted off) 77'
N8	8	(New Zealand) Luke Whitelock
OF	7	(New Zealand) Jordan Taufua	(substituted off) 75'
BF	6	(New Zealand) Brad Shields
RL	5	(New Zealand) Michael Fatialofa
LL	4	(South Africa) Martin Muller	(substituted off) 51'
TP	3	(Australia) Paddy Ryan	(substituted off) 57'
HK	2	(South Africa) Akker van der Merwe	(substituted off) 77'
LP	1	(New Zealand) Reggie Goodes	(substituted off) 51'
Replacements:
HK	16	(Australia) Andrew Ready	(substituted on) 77'
PR	17	(South Africa) Schalk van der Merwe	(substituted on) 57'
PR	18	(Australia) Toby Smith	(substituted on) 51'
LK	19	(Australia) Sam Carter	(substituted on) 51'
FL	20	(South Africa) Ruan Ackermann	(substituted on) 75'
SH	21	(Australia) Nic Stirzaker	(substituted on) 77'
FH	22	(New Zealand) Richie Mo'unga	(substituted on) 51'
WG	23	(Australia) Luke Morahan	(substituted on) 51'
Coach:
(New Zealand) Robbie Deans (England) Will Greenwood

FB	15	Jesse Kriel	(substituted off) 40'
RW	14	Sergeal Petersen
OC	13	Francois Venter
IC	12	Rohan Janse van Rensburg
LW	11	Jamba Ulengo
FH	10	Patrick Lambie (c)
SH	9	Rudy Paige	(substituted off) 68'
N8	8	Nizaam Carr
OF	7	Oupa Mohojé	(substituted off) 51'
BF	6	Roelof Smit
RL	5	Pieter-Steph du Toit
LL	4	RG Snyman	(substituted off) 51'
TP	3	Lourens Adriaanse	(substituted off) 60'
HK	2	Malcolm Marx	(substituted off) 51'
LP	1	Tendai Mtawarira	(substituted off) 68'
Replacements:
HK	16	Bongi Mbonambi	(substituted on) 51'
PR	17	Lizo Gqoboka	(substituted on) 68'
PR	18	Trevor Nyakane	(substituted on) 60'
LK	19	Eben Etzebeth	(substituted on) 51'
FL	20	Jean-Luc du Preez	(substituted on) 51'
SH	21	Piet van Zyl	(substituted on) 68'
FH	22	Tian Schoeman
WG	23	Ruan Combrinck	(substituted on) 40'
Coach:
(South Africa) Allister Coetzee

Man of the Match:
(Australia) Taqele Naiyaravoro (Barbarians)

Touch judges:
Paul Williams (New Zealand)
Shuhei Kubo (Japan)
Television match official:
Graham Hughes (England)

Notes:

- This was the Barbarians first draw with an international team since they drew with Scotland 16−16 in 1991.
- The draw saw the teams share the Killik Cup.

5 November 2016
15:00 CDT (UTC-05)

Ireland	40–29	New Zealand
Try: Murphy 9' c Stander 16' m Murray 33' c Zebo 47' m Henshaw 75' c Con: Sexton (2/4) 10', 34'; Carbery (1/1) 76'; Pen: Sexton (2/2) 3', 23'; Murray (1/1) 58'	Report	Try: Moala 4' m Perenara 51' c B. Smith 55' c S. Barrett 62' c Con: B. Barrett (3/4) 51', 55', 64'; Pen: B. Barrett (1/1) 20'

Soldier Field, Chicago, United States
Attendance: 62,300
Referee: Mathieu Raynal (France)

Team details

FB	15	Rob Kearney
RW	14	Andrew Trimble
OC	13	Jared Payne
IC	12	Robbie Henshaw
LW	11	Simon Zebo
FH	10	Johnny Sexton	(substituted off) 58'
SH	9	Conor Murray
N8	8	Jamie Heaslip
OF	7	Jordi Murphy	(substituted off) 25'
BF	6	CJ Stander
RL	5	Devin Toner
LL	4	Donnacha Ryan	(substituted off) 64'
TP	3	Tadhg Furlong	(substituted off) 56'
HK	2	Rory Best (c)	(substituted off) 70'
LP	1	Jack McGrath	(substituted off) 60'
Replacements:
HK	16	Seán Cronin	(substituted on) 70'
PR	17	Cian Healy	(substituted on) 60'
PR	18	Finlay Bealham	(substituted on) 56'
LK	19	Ultan Dillane	(substituted on) 64'
FL	20	Josh van der Flier	(substituted on) 25'
SH	21	Kieran Marmion
FH	22	Joey Carbery	(substituted on) 58'
CE	23	Garry Ringrose
Coach:
(New Zealand) Joe Schmidt

FB	15	Ben Smith
RW	14	Waisake Naholo		(substituted off) 58'
OC	13	George Moala		(substituted off) 70'
IC	12	Ryan Crotty		(substituted off) 25'
LW	11	Julian Savea
FH	10	Beauden Barrett
SH	9	Aaron Smith		(substituted off) 44'
N8	8	Kieran Read (c)
OF	7	Sam Cane
BF	6	Liam Squire
RL	5	Jerome Kaino		(substituted off) 44'
LL	4	Patrick Tuipulotu		(substituted off) 58'
TP	3	Owen Franks		(substituted off) 58'
HK	2	Dane Coles
LP	1	Joe Moody	(yellow card) 7' to 17'	(substituted off) 58'
Replacements:
HK	16	Codie Taylor		(substituted on) 70'
PR	17	Ofa Tu'ungafasi		(substituted on) 58'
PR	18	Charlie Faumuina		(substituted on) 58'
LK	19	Scott Barrett		(substituted on) 44'
FL	20	Ardie Savea		(substituted on) 58'
SH	21	TJ Perenara		(substituted on) 44'
FH	22	Aaron Cruden		(substituted on) 58'
CE	23	Malakai Fekitoa		(substituted on) 25'
Coach:
(New Zealand) Steve Hansen

Man of the Match:
Conor Murray (Ireland)

Touch judges:
Luke Pearce (England)
Ben Whitehouse (Wales)
Television match official:
Rowan Kitt (England)

Notes:

- Joey Carbery (Ireland) and Scott Barrett (New Zealand) made their international debuts.
- Julian Savea (New Zealand) earned his 50th test cap.
- This was Ireland's first ever victory over New Zealand in 28 attempts since 1905.
- This was the most points (40) and tries (5) New Zealand have conceded in a single test since Steve Hansen became coach and the All Blacks became world champions following the 2011 World Cup, surpassing the 38 points England scored against them in December 2012 and the 4 tries South Africa scored in the final match of the 2013 Rugby Championship.

8 November 2016
19:00 CET (UTC+1)

Czech Republic	0–71	Barbarians
	Report	Try: K. Smith (2) 5' c, 42' c T. Smith 24' m Faddes (2) 28' c, 57' m Carter 34' m Nanai (2) 37' c, 75' c Mo'unga (2) 52' c, 68' c S. Van der Merwe 71' c Con: Mo'unga (2/3) 6', 29'; Du Preez (6/8) 38', 43', 54', 69', 72', 75'

Stadion Markéta, Prague
Attendance: 7,000
Referee: Maxime Burlet (Belgium)

Team details

FB	15	Michal Schlanger
RW	14	Jakub Žalud	(substituted off) 58'
OC	13	Jan Rohlik	(substituted off) 72'
IC	12	Jiří Pantůček
LW	11	Karel Berounský
FH	10	Václav Jursik
SH	9	Marek Šimák	(substituted off) 58'
N8	8	Vojtěch Havel
OF	7	Vojtěch Mára	(substituted off) 72'
BF	6	Vojtěch Hruška
RL	5	Robert Voves (c)
LL	4	Miroslav Němeček	(substituted off) 78'
TP	3	Martin Havliček	(substituted off) 61'
HK	2	Ondřej Kutil	(substituted off) 78'
LP	1	Lukáš Rapant	(substituted off) 78'
Replacements:
HK	16	Hubert Dřimal	(substituted on) 75'
PR	17	Emilio Caldaroni	(substituted on) 75'
LK	18	Jan Olbrich	(substituted on) 75'
LK	19	Martin Charvát	(substituted on) 58'
FL	20	Petr Čížek	(substituted on) 72'
CE	21	Martin Kovář	(substituted on) 72'
SH	22	Vachtang Pailodze	(substituted on) 58'
PR	23	Pavel Elis	(substituted on) 62'
Coach:
(Poland) Thomasz Putra

FB	15	(South Africa) Clayton Blommetjies
RW	14	(Australia) Luke Morahan
OC	13	(New Zealand) Matt Faddes
IC	12	(South Africa) Robert du Preez
LW	11	(Samoa) Melani Nanai
FH	10	(New Zealand) Richie Mo'unga
SH	9	(Australia) Nic Stirzaker
N8	8	(South Africa) Ruan Ackermann
OF	7	(South Africa) Kwagga Smith
BF	6	(Australia) Sam Carter
RL	5	(South Africa) Martin Muller
LL	4	(Ireland) Dan Tuohy (c)
TP	3	(Australia) Toby Smith	(substituted off) 63'
HK	2	(Australia) Andrew Ready
LP	1	(South Africa) Schalk van der Merwe
Replacements:
HK	16	(South Africa) Akker van der Merwe
PR	17	(New Zealand) Reggie Goodes
PR	18	(New Zealand) Ben Franks	(substituted on) 63'
LK	19	(New Zealand) Michael Fatialofa
FL	20	(New Zealand) Brad Shields
SH	21	(New Zealand) Andrew Ellis
FL	22	(New Zealand) Jordan Taufua
CE	23	(New Zealand) Richard Buckman
Coach:
(New Zealand) Robbie Deans (England) Will Greenwood

Man of the Match:
(Samoa) Melani Nanai (Barbarians)

Touch judges:
Tomáš Tuma (Czech Republic)
Matej Rázga (Czech Republic)

Notes:

- This was the first time since beating South Africa 6–0 in 1961, that the Barbarians has not conceded any points against an international opposition.

11 November 2016
19:30 GMT (UTC+0)

Barbarians	40–7	Fiji
Try: Van der Merwe (2) 1' c, 17' c Faddes 5' c Ellis 25' c Mo'unga 74' c Morahan 79' m Con: Du Preez (5/6) 2', 6', 18', 26', 75'	Report	Try: Nayacalevu 54' c Con: Nadolo (1/1) 55'

Kingspan Stadium, Belfast
Attendance: 13,000
Referee: Nick Briant (New Zealand)

Team details

FB	15	(Samoa) Melani Nanai
RW	14	(New Zealand) Matt Faddes
OC	13	(Ireland) Tommy Bowe
IC	12	(New Zealand) Richard Buckman	(substituted off) 62'
LW	11	(Australia) Taqele Naiyaravoro	(substituted off) 62'
FH	10	(South Africa) Robert du Preez
SH	9	(New Zealand) Andy Ellis (c)	(substituted off) 56'
N8	8	(New Zealand) Luke Whitelock
OF	7	(New Zealand) Jordan Taufua	(substituted off) 62'
BF	6	(New Zealand) Brad Shields
RL	5	(Australia) Sam Carter
LL	4	(New Zealand) Michael Fatialofa	(substituted off) 62'
TP	3	(New Zealand) Ben Franks	(substituted off) 62'
HK	2	(South Africa) Akker van der Merwe	(substituted off) 62'
LP	1	(New Zealand) Reggie Goodes	(substituted off) 62'
Replacements:
HK	16	(Australia) Andrew Ready	(substituted on) 62'
PR	17	(Australia) Toby Smith	(substituted on) 62'
PR	18	(Australia) Paddy Ryan	(substituted on) 62'
LK	19	(South Africa) Martin Muller	(substituted on) 62'
FL	20	(South Africa) Ruan Ackermann	(substituted on) 62'
SH	21	(South Africa) Ruan Pienaar	(substituted on) 56'
FH	22	(New Zealand) Richie Mo'unga	(substituted on) 62'
WG	23	(Australia) Luke Morahan	(substituted on) 62'
Coach:
(New Zealand) Robbie Deans (England) Will Greenwood

FB	15	Benito Masilevu
RW	14	Waisea Nayacalevu	(substituted off) 56'
OC	13	Asaeli Tikoirotuma
IC	12	Albert Vulivuli	(substituted off) 67'
LW	11	Nemani Nadolo
FH	10	Ben Volavola	(substituted off) 51'
SH	9	Serupepeli Vularika
N8	8	Akapusi Qera (c)
OF	7	Mosese Voka	(substituted off) 76'
BF	6	Naulia Dawai
RL	5	Dominiko Waqaniburotu	(substituted off) 63'
LL	4	Api Ratuniyarawa
TP	3	Manasa Saulo	(substituted off) 63'
HK	2	Jale Sassen	(substituted off) 44'
LP	1	Campese Ma'afu	(substituted off) 56'
Replacements:
PR	16	Joeli Veitayaki Jr.	(substituted on) 44'
PR	17	Sunia Koto	(substituted on) 56'
PR	18	Lee Roy Atalifo	(substituted on) 63'
LK	19	Nemia Soqeta	(substituted on) 63'
N8	20	Eremasi Radrodro	(substituted on) 76'
SH	21	Nemia Kenatale	(substituted on) 51'
FB	22	Metuisela Talebula	(substituted on) 56'
FH	23	Vatemo Ravouvou	(substituted on) 67'
Coach:
(New Zealand) John McKee

Man of the Match:
(South Africa) Robert du Preez (Barbarians)

Touch judges:
George Clancy (Ireland)
David Wilkinson (Ireland)
Television match official:
Neil Paterson (Scotland)

11 November 2016
19:45 WET (UTC+0)

Munster (Ireland)	27–14	Māori All Blacks
Try: N. Scannell 13' m Penalty try 30' c Sweetnam 37' m O'Mahony 68' c Con: Keatley (2/4) 30', 69'; Pen: Keatley (1/1) 43'	Report	Try: Lowe 23' c Curtis 25' c Con: Black (2/2) 24', 27'

Thomond Park, Limerick
Attendance: 25,600
Referee: Craig Maxwell-Keys (England)

Team details

FB	15	(Ireland) Andrew Conway
RW	14	(Ireland) Darren Sweetnam
OC	13	(South Africa) Jaco Taute		(substituted off) 75'
IC	12	(Ireland) Rory Scannell
LW	11	(Ireland) Ronan O'Mahony		(substituted off) 75'
FH	10	(Ireland) Ian Keatley
SH	9	(Ireland) Duncan Williams	(yellow card) 45' to 55'
N8	8	(Ireland) Robin Copeland
OF	7	(Ireland) Conor Oliver
BF	6	(Ireland) Tommy O'Donnell (c)
RL	5	(Ireland) Darren O'Shea		(substituted off) 75'
LL	4	(Ireland) John Madigan		(substituted off) 54'
TP	3	(Ireland) Stephen Archer		(substituted off) 71'
HK	2	(Ireland) Niall Scannell		(substituted off) 60'
LP	1	(Ireland) James Cronin		(substituted off) 25'
Replacements:
HK	16	(New Zealand) Rhys Marshall		(substituted on) 60'
PR	17	(Ireland) Peter McCabe		(substituted on) 25'
PR	18	(Ireland) Brian Scott		(substituted on) 71'
LK	19	(Ireland) Sean O'Connor		(substituted on) 54'
FL	20	(Ireland) John Foley		(substituted on) 75'
SH	21	(New Zealand) Te Aihe Toma
CE	22	(Ireland) Dan Goggin		(substituted on) 75'
WG	23	(Ireland) Alex Wootton		(substituted on) 75'
Coach:
(South Africa) Rassie Erasmus

FB	15	Marty McKenzie		(substituted off) 62'
RW	14	Ambrose Curtis
OC	13	Matt Proctor
IC	12	Tim Bateman
LW	11	James Lowe
FH	10	Otere Black		(substituted off) 58'
SH	9	Billy Guyton		(substituted off) 50'
N8	8	Akira Ioane
OF	7	Shane Christie		(substituted off) 71'
BF	6	Reed Prinsep	(yellow card) 30' to 40'
RL	5	Jacob Skeen			(substituted off) 58'
LL	4	Leighton Price		(substituted off) 50'	(substituted on) 58'
TP	3	Ben May		(substituted off) 75'
HK	2	Ash Dixon (c)		(substituted off) 75'
LP	1	Kane Hames		(substituted off) 70'
Replacements:
PR	16	Leni Apisai		(substituted on) 75'
PR	17	Chris Eves		(substituted on) 70'
PR	18	Marcel Renata		(substituted on) 75'
N8	19	Whetu Douglas		(substituted on) 50'
FL	20	Kara Pryor		(substituted on) 71'
SH	21	Brad Weber		(substituted on) 50'
FH	22	Ihaia West		(substituted on) 58'
CE	23	Jason Emery		(substituted on) 62'
Coach:
(New Zealand) Colin Cooper

Touch judges:
Frank Murphy (Ireland)
Leo Colgan (Ireland)
Television match official:
Brian MacNeice (Ireland)

Notes:

- This was Munster's first ever match against the Māori All Blacks.

12 November 2016
15:00 GET (UTC+4)

Georgia	22−28	Japan
Try: Kolelishvili 25' m Lobzhanidze 37' c Bitsadze 49' c Con: Kvirikashvili (2/3) 37', 51'; Pen: Kvirikashvili (1/1) 56'	Report	Try: Matsushima 8' m Lemeki (2) 44' m, 59' c Fukuoka 63' m Con: Tamura (1/4) 61'; Pen: Tamura (2/3) 16', 75'

Mikheil Meskhi Stadium, Tbilisi
Attendance: 22,000
Referee: Federico Anselmi (Argentina)

Team details

FB	15	Merab Kvirikashvili
RW	14	Tamaz Mchedlidze
OC	13	Davit Kacharava		(substituted off) 36'
IC	12	Merab Sharikadze
LW	11	Giorgi Aptsiauri
FH	10	Lasha Khmaladze		(substituted off) 10'
SH	9	Vasil Lobzhanidze		(substituted off) 65'
N8	8	Beka Bitsadze				(substituted off) 65'
OF	7	Viktor Kolelishvili
BF	6	Mamuka Gorgodze (c)
RL	5	Giorgi Nemsadze
LL	4	Konstantin Mikautadze		(substituted off) 65'
TP	3	Levan Chilachava		(substituted off) 54'
HK	2	Jaba Bregvadze
LP	1	Mikheil Nariashvili		(substituted off) 61'
Replacements:
HK	16	Badri Alkhazashvili
PR	17	Vasil Kakovin		(substituted on) 61'
PR	18	Davit Kubriashvili		(substituted on) 54'
N8	19	Lasha Lomidze		(substituted on) 65'
FL	20	Giorgi Tkhilaishvili		(substituted on) 36'	(substituted off) 51'	(substituted on) 65'
SH	21	Giorgi Begadze		(substituted on) 65'
FH	22	Lasha Malaghuradze		(substituted on) 10'
WG	23	Anzor Sitchinava	(yellow card) 66' to 76'		(substituted on) 51'
Coach:
(New Zealand) Milton Haig

FB	15	Kotaro Matsushima
RW	14	Lomano Lemeki	(substituted off) 79'
OC	13	Timothy Lafaele	(substituted off) 76'
IC	12	Harumichi Tatekawa
LW	11	Karne Hesketh	(substituted off) 51'
FH	10	Yu Tamura
SH	9	Fumiaki Tanaka
N8	8	Amanaki Mafi
OF	7	Shunsuke Nunomaki
BF	6	Malgene Ilaua	(substituted off) 54'
RL	5	Kyosuke Kajikawa
LL	4	Kotaro Yatabe	(substituted off) 40'
TP	3	Heiichiro Ito	(substituted off) 61'
HK	2	Shota Horie (c)
LP	1	Satoshi Nakatani	(substituted off) 58'
Replacements:
HK	16	Takeshi Hino
PR	17	Masataka Mikami	(substituted on) 58'
PR	18	Yasuo Yamaji	(substituted on) 61'
LK	19	Samuela Anise	(substituted on) 40'
FL	20	Uwe Helu	(substituted on) 54'
SH	21	Keisuke Uchida	(substituted on) 79'
FB	22	Amanaki Lotoahea	(substituted on) 76'
WG	23	Kenki Fukuoka	(substituted on) 51'
Coach:
(New Zealand) Jamie Joseph

Man of the Match:
Lomano Lemeki (Japan)

Touch judges:
Pascal Gaüzère (France)
Dan Jones (Wales)
Television match official:
Brian MacNeice (Ireland)

Notes:

- Anzor Sitchinava (Georgia) and Shunsuke Nunomaki and Yasuo Yamaji (both Japan) made their international debuts.

12 November 2016
15:00 CET (UTC+1)

Italy	10–68	New Zealand
Try: Boni 66' c Con: Allan (1/1) 68'; Pen: Canna (1/1) 12'	Report	Try: Fekitoa (2) 3' c, 57' c Faumuina 14' c Tuipulotu 19' c Dagg 25' c Crockett 37' c Luatua 44' c Dixon 61' m Ioane 72' c Naholo 76' c Con: Cruden (7/7) 4', 16', 20', 26', 38', 46', 58'; Sopoaga (2/3) 73', 76'

Stadio Olimpico, Rome
Attendance: 60,693
Referee: Nigel Owens (Wales)

Team details

FB	15	Edoardo Padovani
RW	14	Giulio Bisegni
OC	13	Tommaso Benvenuti
IC	12	Luke McLean
LW	11	Angelo Esposito	(substituted off) 64'
FH	10	Carlo Canna	(substituted off) 49'
SH	9	Giorgio Bronzini	(substituted off) 49'
N8	8	Sergio Parisse (c)
OF	7	Simone Favaro
BF	6	Maxime Mbanda	(substituted off) 54'
RL	5	Andries van Schalkwyk
LL	4	Marco Fuser	(substituted off) 54'
TP	3	Lorenzo Cittadini	(substituted off) 43'
HK	2	Leonardo Ghiraldini	(substituted off) 10'
LP	1	Andrea Lovotti	(substituted off) 78'
Replacements:
HK	16	Ornel Gega	(substituted on) 10'
PR	17	Sami Panico	(substituted on) 78'
PR	18	Pietro Ceccarelli	(substituted on) 43'
LK	19	George Biagi	(substituted on) 54'
FL	20	Francesco Minto	(substituted on) 54'
SH	21	Edoardo Gori	(substituted on) 49'
FH	22	Tommaso Allan	(substituted on) 49'
CE	23	Tommaso Boni	(substituted on) 64'
Coach:
(Ireland) Conor O'Shea

FB	15	Damian McKenzie
RW	14	Israel Dagg	(substituted off) 49'
OC	13	Malakai Fekitoa
IC	12	Anton Lienert-Brown
LW	11	Waisake Naholo
FH	10	Aaron Cruden	(substituted off) 58'
SH	9	Tawera Kerr-Barlow	(substituted off) 49'
N8	8	Steve Luatua
OF	7	Sam Cane (c)
BF	6	Elliot Dixon
RL	5	Scott Barrett	(substituted off) 54'
LL	4	Patrick Tuipulotu	(substituted off) 58'
TP	3	Charlie Faumuina	(substituted off) 55'
HK	2	Codie Taylor	(substituted off) 65'
LP	1	Wyatt Crockett	(substituted off) 69'
Replacements:
HK	16	Liam Coltman	(substituted on) 65'
PR	17	Joe Moody	(substituted on) 69'
PR	18	Ofa Tu'ungafasi	(substituted on) 55'
LK	19	Brodie Retallick	(substituted on) 54'
FL	20	Matt Todd	(substituted on) 58'
SH	21	Aaron Smith	(substituted on) 49'
FH	22	Lima Sopoaga	(substituted on) 58'
WG	23	Rieko Ioane	(substituted on) 49'
Coach:
(New Zealand) Steve Hansen

Man of the Match:
Aaron Cruden (New Zealand)

Touch judges:
Alexandre Ruiz (France)
Dudley Phillips (Ireland)
Television match official:
Eric Gauzins (France)

Notes:

- Giorgio Bronzini (Italy) and Liam Coltman and Rieko Ioane (both New Zealand) made their international debuts.

12 November 2016
14:30 GMT (UTC+0)

England	37–21	South Africa
Try: May 10' c Lawes 35' c Ford 43' c Farrell 66' c Con: Farrell (4/4) 11', 36', 43', 66'; Pen: Farrell (2/3) 33', 43'; Daly (1/1) 40'	Report	Try: Goosen 58' m Le Roux 78' c Con: Combrinck (1/1) 79'; Pen: Lambie (2/3) 3', 20'; Drop: Lambie (1/1) 6'

Twickenham Stadium, London
Attendance: 80,000
Referee: Jérôme Garcès (France)

Team details

FB	15	Mike Brown
RW	14	Marland Yarde
OC	13	Elliot Daly
IC	12	Owen Farrell
LW	11	Jonny May	(substituted off) 62'
FH	10	George Ford	(substituted off) 70'
SH	9	Ben Youngs	(substituted off) 67'
N8	8	Billy Vunipola	(substituted off) 70'
OF	7	Tom Wood	(substituted off) 53'
BF	6	Chris Robshaw
RL	5	Courtney Lawes
LL	4	Joe Launchbury
TP	3	Dan Cole	(substituted off) 71'
HK	2	Dylan Hartley (c)	(substituted off) 56'
LP	1	Mako Vunipola	(substituted off) 62'
Replacements:
HK	16	Jamie George	(substituted on) 56'
PR	17	Joe Marler	(substituted on) 62'
PR	18	Kyle Sinckler	(substituted on) 71'
LK	19	Dave Attwood	(substituted on) 70'
N8	20	Nathan Hughes	(substituted on) 53'
SH	21	Danny Care	(substituted on) 67'
CE	22	Ben Te'o	(substituted on) 70'
CE	23	Jonathan Joseph	(substituted on) 62'
Coach:
(Australia) Eddie Jones

FB	15	Willie le Roux
RW	14	Ruan Combrinck
OC	13	Francois Venter
IC	12	Damian de Allende
LW	11	JP Pietersen	(substituted off) 76'
FH	10	Patrick Lambie	(substituted off) 53'
SH	9	Rudy Paige	(substituted off) 62'
N8	8	Warren Whiteley
OF	7	Pieter-Steph du Toit
BF	6	Willem Alberts
RL	5	Lood de Jager	(substituted off) 67'
LL	4	Eben Etzebeth	(substituted off) 30'
TP	3	Vincent Koch	(substituted off) 56'
HK	2	Adriaan Strauss (c)	(substituted off) 70'
LP	1	Tendai Mtawarira	(substituted off) 56'
Replacements:
HK	16	Bongi Mbonambi	(substituted on) 70'
PR	17	Steven Kitshoff	(substituted on) 56'
PR	18	Lourens Adriaanse	(substituted on) 56'
LK	19	Franco Mostert	(substituted on) 30'
FL	20	Nizaam Carr	(substituted on) 67'
SH	21	Faf de Klerk	(substituted on) 62'
FB	22	Johan Goosen	(substituted on) 53'
CE	23	Lionel Mapoe	(substituted on) 76'
Coach:
(South Africa) Allister Coetzee

Man of the Match:
Joe Launchbury (England)

Touch judges:
Glen Jackson (New Zealand)
Andrew Brace (Ireland)
Television match official:
Jon Mason (Wales)

Notes:

- Nathan Hughes, Kyle Sinckler and Ben Te'o (all England) and Francois Venter (South Africa) made their international debut.
- Courtney Lawes (England) earned his 50th test cap.
- This was England 's first win over South Africa since their 23–21 win during the 2006 Autumn Internationals.

12 November 2016
14:30 GMT (UTC+0)

Scotland	22–23	Australia
Try: Jones (2) 7' c, 26' c J. Gray 47' m Con: Laidlaw (2/3) 8', 27'; Pen: Laidlaw (1/2) 2'	Report	Try: Hodge 12' c Kuridrani 74' c Con: Foley (2/2) 14', 76'; Pen: Foley (3/3) 22', 41', 55'

Murrayfield Stadium, Edinburgh
Attendance: 65,395
Referee: John Lacey (Ireland)

Team details

FB	15	Stuart Hogg
RW	14	Sean Maitland
OC	13	Huw Jones
IC	12	Alex Dunbar	(substituted off) 69'
LW	11	Tim Visser
FH	10	Finn Russell
SH	9	Greig Laidlaw (c)
N8	8	Ryan Wilson	(substituted off) 4'
OF	7	Hamish Watson
BF	6	John Barclay
RL	5	Jonny Gray
LL	4	Richie Gray	(substituted off) 12'	(substituted on) 18'
TP	3	Zander Fagerson	(substituted off) 67'
HK	2	Ross Ford	(substituted off) 55'
LP	1	Allan Dell	(substituted off) 51'
Replacements:
HK	16	Fraser Brown	(substituted on) 55'
PR	17	Gordon Reid	(substituted on) 51'
PR	18	Moray Low	(substituted on) 67'
LK	19	Grant Gilchrist	(substituted on) 12'	(substituted off) 18'	(substituted on) 61'
FL	20	John Hardie	(substituted on) 4'		(substituted off) 61'
SH	21	Ali Price
FH	22	Peter Horne	(substituted on) 69'
WG	23	Rory Hughes
Coach:
(New Zealand) Vern Cotter

FB	15	Israel Folau
RW	14	Dane Haylett-Petty
OC	13	Tevita Kuridrani
IC	12	Reece Hodge
LW	11	Henry Speight
FH	10	Bernard Foley
SH	9	Will Genia		(substituted off) 67'
N8	8	Lopeti Timani		(substituted off) 61'
OF	7	Michael Hooper
BF	6	David Pocock
RL	5	Adam Coleman		(substituted off) 4'
LL	4	Rory Arnold		(substituted off) 48'
TP	3	Sekope Kepu		(substituted off) 61'
HK	2	Stephen Moore (c)
LP	1	Scott Sio		(substituted off) 72'
Replacements:
HK	16	Tolu Latu
PR	17	Tom Robertson		(substituted on) 72'
PR	18	Allan Alaalatoa		(substituted on) 61'
LK	19	Rob Simmons		(substituted on) 4'
LK	20	Will Skelton	(yellow card) 68' to 78'	(substituted on) 61'
FL	21	Dean Mumm		(substituted on) 48'
SH	22	Nick Phipps		(substituted on) 67'
FH	23	Quade Cooper
Coach:
(Australia) Michael Cheika

Man of the Match:
Huw Jones (Scotland)

Touch judges:
Ben O'Keeffe (New Zealand)
Ian Davies (Wales)
Television match official:
Simon McDowell (Ireland)

Notes:

- Allan Dell (Scotland) made his international debut.
- Ross Ford (Scotland) became the third Scotsman to earn his 100th test cap.
- Israel Folau and Nick Phipps (both Australia) earned their 50th test caps.
- Australia retain the Hopetoun Cup.

12 November 2016
15:00 WET (UTC+0)

Portugal	26–21	Belgium
Try: Appleton 7' c Magalhães 12' c G. Foro (2) 21' m, 35' c Con: Ávila (3/4) 8', 12', 36'	Report (In French)	Try: K. Williams 40' c Brébant 55' c Debatty 67' c Con: K. Williams (3/3) 40', 57', 68'

Complexo Municipal de Atletismo, Setúbal
Referee: Iñigo Atorrasagasti (Spain)

Team details

FB	15	Pedro Bettencourt Ávila
RW	14	Gonçalo Foro
OC	13	Tomás Appleton
IC	12	José Lima
LW	11	Adérito Esteves
FH	10	Nuno Penha e Costa
SH	9	Francisco Pinto Magalhães
N8	8	Vasco Mendes
OF	7	Sebastião Villax
BF	6	João Lino
RL	5	Gonçalo Uva (c)
LL	4	Salvador Vassalo
TP	3	Francisco Bruno
HK	2	Duarte Diniz
LP	1	Bruno Medeiros
Replacements:
PR	16	João Côrte-Real
HK	17	Duarte Foro
PR	18	Diogo Hasse Ferreira
LK	19	Fernando Almeida
FL	20	Pedro Rosa
SH	21	Pedro Leal
FB	22	Nuno Sousa Guedes
CE	23	Manuel Vilela
Coach:
(Portugal) Martim Aguiar

FB	15	Alan Williams
RW	14	Thomas Walraff
OC	13	Hendrik Brouwers
IC	12	Guillaume Brébant
LW	11	Thomas Brouillard
FH	10	Kevin Williams
SH	9	Julien Berger (c)
N8	8	Bertrand Billi
OF	7	Amin Hamzaoui
BF	6	Gillian Benoy
RL	5	Tuur Moelants
LL	4	Thomas Vervoort
TP	3	Christophe Debaty
HK	2	Max Dubois
LP	1	Lucas Sotteau
Replacements:
HK	16	James Pearce
PR	17	Sydney Mulumba
PR	18	Julien Massimi
LK	19	Alec Maloir
FL	20	Michael Abrahams
CE	21	Louis Debatty
FH	22	Jens Torfs
SH	23	Tom Cocqu
Coach:
(Belgium) Guillaume Ajac

Touch judges:
Portugal Appt. (Portugal)
Portugal Appt. (Portugal)

12 November 2016
16:00 CET (UTC+1)

Spain	13–28	Tonga
Try: Howarth 44' c Con: Linklater (1/1) 44'; Pen: Linklater (2/3) 29', 61'	Report (In Spanish)	Try: Faleafa 31' c Vainikolo 33' c Takulua 57' c Hala 78' c Con: Takulua (4/4) 31', 34', 58', 79'

Estadio Nacional Complutense, Madrid
Attendance: 12,500
Referee: Shuhei Kubo (Japan)

Team details

FB	15	Brad Linklater
RW	14	Ignacio Contardi	(substituted off) 73'
OC	13	Fabien Perrin
IC	12	Thibaut Alvarez	(substituted off) 69'
LW	11	Sébastien Ascarat
FH	10	Mathieu Bélie
SH	9	Sébastien Rouet	(substituted off) 58'
N8	8	Jaime Nava de Olano (c)
OF	7	Gauthier Gibouin
BF	6	Pierre Barthere	(substituted off) 32'
RL	5	David González	(substituted off) 58'
LL	4	David Barrera Howarth
TP	3	Jesús Moreno	(substituted off) 46'
HK	2	Marco Pinto Ferrer	(substituted off) 47'
LP	1	Beñat Auzqui	(substituted off) 61'
Replacements:
PR	16	Fernando Martin López Perez	(substituted on) 61'
HK	17	Juan Anaya Lazaro	(substituted on) 47'
PR	18	Jonathan García	(substituted on) 46'
N8	19	Carlos Gavidi	(substituted on) 32'
FL	20	Mathew Foulds	(substituted on) 58'
SH	21	Grégory Maïquez	(substituted on) 58'
WG	22	Jordi Jorba	(substituted on) 73'
FH	23	Alvar Gimeno	(substituted on) 69'
Coach:
(Spain) Santiago Santos

FB	15	David Halaifonua
RW	14	Nafi Tuitavake		(substituted off) 79'
OC	13	Siale Piutau (c)
IC	12	Latiume Fosita		(substituted off) 79'
LW	11	Fetuʻu Vainikolo
FH	10	Kali Hala
SH	9	Sonatane Takulua		(substituted off) 79'
N8	8	Tevita Koloamatangi		(substituted off) 61'
OF	7	Jack Ram
BF	6	Daniel Faleafa		(substituted off) 37'	(substituted on) 47'	(substituted off) 72'
RL	5	Joe Tuineau
LL	4	Steve Mafi
TP	3	Siua Halanukonuka		(substituted off) 59'
HK	2	Paul Ngauamo		(substituted off) 63'
LP	1	Tevita Mailau	(yellow card) 37' to 47'			(substituted off) 69'	(substituted on) 79'
Replacements:
HK	16	Elvis Taione		(substituted on) 63'
PR	17	Sione Lea		(substituted on) 37'	(substituted off) 47'	(substituted on) 69'	(substituted off) 79'
PR	18	Paea Faʻanunu		(substituted on) 59'
FL	19	Valentino Mapapalangi		(substituted on) 61'
FL	20	Kotoni Ale				(substituted on) 72'
SH	21	Tomasi Palu		(substituted on) 79'
CE	22	Tevita Taufuʻi		(substituted on) 79'
WG	23	Fetuli Paea		(substituted on) 79'
Coach:
(Australia) Toutai Kefu

Touch judges:
Marius Mitrea (Italy)
Ian Tempest (England)
Television match official:
Graham Hughes (England)

- Mathew Foulds, Carlos Gavidi, Alvar Gimeno and Fabien Perrin (all Spain) and Kotoni Ale, Tevita Koloamatangi, Valentino Mapapalangi, Fetuli Paea and Tevita Taufuʻi (all Tonga) made their international debuts.
- This was the first ever match played between these two nations.
- This was Tonga's 100th test victory.

12 November 2016
18:00 EET (UTC+2)

Romania	23–10	United States
Try: Van Heerden 6' c Fercu 10' m Lucaci 33' m Con: Vlaicu (1/3) 8'; Pen: Vlaicu (2/3) 15', 73'	Report (In Romanian)	Try: Holder 51' c Con: Holder (1/1) 52'; Pen: Holder (1/1) 68'

Stadionul Arcul de Triumf, Bucharest
Attendance: 5,000
Referee: Paul Williams (New Zealand)

Team details

FB	15	Cătălin Fercu		(substituted off) 75'
RW	14	Tangimana Fonovai
OC	13	Jack Umaga		39' to 40'
IC	12	Florin Vlaicu
LW	11	Ionuț Dumitru
FH	10	Jody Rose
SH	9	Florin Surugiu		(substituted off) 70'
N8	8	Stelian Burcea (c)		(substituted off) 56'	(substituted on) 66'
OF	7	Vasile Rus		(substituted off) 53'
BF	6	Viorel Lucaci
RL	5	Marius Antonescu		(substituted off) 70'
LL	4	Johan van Heerden
TP	3	Alexandru Țăruș		(substituted off) 73'
HK	2	Eugen Căpățână	(yellow card) 56' to 66'		(substituted off) 66'
LP	1	Mihai Lazăr		(substituted off) 48'
Replacements:
HK	16	Andrei Rădoi		(substituted on) 56'
PR	17	Ionel Badiu		(substituted on) 48'
PR	18	Alexandru Gordaș		(substituted on) 73'
LK	19	Valentin Popârlan		(substituted on) 70'
FL	20	Andrei Gorcioaia		(substituted on) 53'
SH	21	Valentin Calafeteanu		(substituted on) 70'
WG	22	Stephen Shennan		(substituted on) 39'	(substituted off) 40'
CE	23	Florin Popa		(substituted on) 75'
Coach:
(Wales) Lynn Howells

FB	15	Madison Hughes	(substituted off) 73'
RW	14	Blaine Scully
OC	13	Thretton Palamo
IC	12	Bryce Campbell
LW	11	Martin Iosefo
FH	10	Will Holder
SH	9	Nate Augspurger
N8	8	Andrew Durutalo
OF	7	Todd Clever (c)	(substituted off) 53'
BF	6	Alastair McFarland
RL	5	Nick Civetta
LL	4	Nate Brakeley	(substituted off) 40'
TP	3	Chris Baumann
HK	2	Joe Taufete'e	(substituted off) 66'
LP	1	Titi Lamositele	(substituted off) 68'
Replacements:
HK	16	James Hilterbrand	(substituted on) 66'
PR	17	Eric Fry	(substituted on) 68'
PR	18	Dino Waldren
LK	19	Samu Manoa	(substituted on) 40'
N8	20	Langilangi Haupeakui	(substituted on) 53'
SH	21	Stephen Tomasin
FH	22	JP Eloff
WG	23	Matai Leuta	(substituted on) 73'
Coach:
(New Zealand) John Mitchell

Touch judges:
Greg Garner (England)
Gary Conway (Ireland)
Television match official:
Carlo Damasco (England)

Notes:

- Tangimana Fonovai and Florin Popa (both Romania) and Bryce Campbell, Nick Civetta, Madison Hughes, Martin Iosefo and Matai Leuta (all United States) made their international debuts.
- Romania claimed the Pershing Cup.

12 November 2016
17:45 CET (UTC+1)

France	52–8	Samoa
Try: Vakatawa (3) 11' m, 64' m, 77' c Huget 28' m Ollivon 32' c Fickou 55' c Penalty try 75' c Con: Machenaud (2/5) 33', 56'; Serin (2/2) 76', 78'; Pen: Machenaud (3/3) 9', 24', 37'	Report	Try: Lee-Lo 41' m Pen: Fa'apale (1/1) 7'

Stadium Municipal, Toulouse
Attendance: 33,000
Referee: JP Doyle (England)

Team details

FB	15	Scott Spedding
RW	14	Yoann Huget
OC	13	Rémi Lamerat	(substituted off) 47'
IC	12	Wesley Fofana
LW	11	Virimi Vakatawa
FH	10	François Trinh-Duc	(substituted off) 47'
SH	9	Maxime Machenaud	(substituted off) 66'
N8	8	Loann Goujon	(substituted off) 10'
OF	7	Kevin Gourdon		(substituted off) 69'
BF	6	Louis Picamoles
RL	5	Yoann Maestri
LL	4	Julien Le Devedec	(substituted off) 50'	(substituted on) 69'
TP	3	Uini Atonio	(substituted off) 51'
HK	2	Guilhem Guirado (c)	12' to 16'		(substituted off) 55'
LP	1	Jefferson Poirot	(substituted off) 35'
Replacements:
HK	16	Camille Chat	(substituted on) 12'	(substituted off) 16'	(substituted on) 55'
PR	17	Cyril Baille	(substituted on) 35'
PR	18	Rabah Slimani	(substituted on) 51'
LK	19	Sebastien Vahaamahina	(substituted on) 50'
N8	20	Charles Ollivon	(substituted on) 10'
SH	21	Baptiste Serin	(substituted on) 66'
FH	22	Jean-Marc Doussain	(substituted on) 47'
CE	23	Gaël Fickou	(substituted on) 47'
Coach:
(France) Guy Novès

FB	15	Paul Williams
RW	14	Paul Perez
OC	13	George Pisi	(substituted off) 76'
IC	12	Rey Lee-Lo
LW	11	David Lemi (c)
FH	10	Patrick Fa'apale	(substituted off) 69'
SH	9	Kahn Fotuali'i
N8	8	Genesis Mamea
OF	7	Jack Lam	(substituted off) 56'
BF	6	Alafoti Fa'osiliva
RL	5	Filo Paulo
LL	4	Chris Vui	(substituted off) 56'
TP	3	Census Johnston	(substituted off) 48'
HK	2	Manu Leiataua	(substituted off) 63'
LP	1	Sakaria Taulafo	(substituted off) 48'
Replacements:
HK	16	Elia Elia	(substituted on) 63'
PR	17	Logovi'i Mulipola	(substituted on) 48'
PR	18	Anthony Perenise	(substituted on) 48'
LK	19	Jeff Lepa	(substituted on) 56'
FL	20	Greg Foe	(substituted on) 56'
SH	21	Pele Cowley
FH	22	D'Angelo Leuila	(substituted on) 69'
WG	23	Ken Pisi	(substituted on) 76'
Coach:
(New Zealand) Alama Ieremia

Man of the Match:
Virimi Vakatawa (France)

Touch judges:
Craig Joubert (South Africa)
Tom Foley (England)
Television match official:
Stefano Pennè (Italy)

Notes:

- Cyril Baille (France) and Elia Elia, Genesis Mamea and Chris Vui (all Samoa) made their international debuts.

12 November 2016
17:45 CET (UTC+1)

Germany	24–21	Uruguay
Try: Otto 47' c Poppmeier 51' m Con: Hilsenbeck (1/2) 48'; Pen: Hilsenbeck (4/8) 17', 31', 57', 80'	Report	Try: Silva (2) 2' m, 24' c Con: Berchesi (1/2) 25'; Pen: Berchesi (3/4) 28', 49', 68'

Frankfurter Volksbank Stadion, Frankfurt
Attendance: 3,500
Referee: Lloyd Linton (Scotland)

Team details

FB	15	Raynor Parkinson
RW	14	Steffen Liebig
OC	13	Marcel Coetzee		(substituted off) 61'
IC	12	Carlos Soteras-Merz
LW	11	Marvin Dieckmann
FH	10	Chris Hilsenbeck
SH	9	Tim Menzel
N8	8	Jaco Otto		(substituted off) 59'
OF	7	Jarrid Els
BF	6	Adriaan Theisinger		(substituted off) 61'
RL	5	Michael Poppmeier (c)		(substituted off) 59'
LL	4	Erik Marks	(yellow card) 7' to 17'
TP	3	Samy Füchsel
HK	2	Mika Tyumenev
LP	1	Julius Nostadt		(substituted off) 61'
Replacements:
HK	16	Dasch Barber		(substituted on) 61'
PR	17	Jörn Schröder		(substituted on) 61'
PR	18	Chris Howells
N8	19	Timo Vollenkemper		(substituted on) 59'
FL	20	Sebastian Ferreira		(substituted on) 59'
SH	21	Raphael Pyrasch
CE	22	Harris Aounallah
WG	23	Clemens von Grumbkow		(substituted on) 61'
Coach:
(South Africa) Kobus Potgieter

FB	15	Manuel Blengio
RW	14	Rodrigo Silva
OC	13	Jerónimo Etcheverry
IC	12	Nicolás Freitas	(yellow card) 31' to 41'
LW	11	Andrés Rocco		(substituted off) 61'
FH	10	Felipe Berchesi
SH	9	Guillermo Lijtenstein (c)		(substituted off) 77'
N8	8	Gonzalo Soto
OF	7	Santiago Hernández
BF	6	Joaquín Dell’acqua		(substituted off) 57'
RL	5	Diego Ayala		(substituted off) 68'
LL	4	Diego Magno
TP	3	Juan Echeverría
HK	2	Facundo Gattas
LP	1	Mateo Sanguinetti
Replacements:
HK	16	Marcos Chamyan
PR	17	Ignacio Secco
PR	18	Francisco Jiménez
LK	19	Ignacio Dotti		(substituted on) 68'
FL	20	Juan Manuel Gaminara		(substituted on) 57'
SH	21	Santiago Arata		(substituted on) 77'
WG	22	Mauro Daverio
CE	23	Juan Manuel Cat		(substituted on) 61'
Coach:
(Argentina) Esteban Meneses

Touch judges:
Vlad Iordachescu (Romania)
Shota Tevzadze (Georgia)

Notes:

- Dasch Barber, Marcel Coetzee, Marvin Dieckmann and Sebastian Ferreira (all Germany) and Juan Manuel Cat and Santiago Hernández (both Uruguay) made their international debuts.
- This was the first ever meeting between the two nations.
- This was the first time since 27 October 2012, that Germany has beaten a side ranked higher than them in the World Rugby Rankings; Germany (31) Ukraine (29).

12 November 2016
17:30 GMT (UTC+0)

Wales	24–20	Argentina
Try: L. Williams 42' m G. Davies 54' c Con: Halfpenny (1/2) 55'; Pen: Halfpenny (4/4) 14', 23', 65', 77'	Report	Try: Hernández 47' c Landajo 60' c Con: Sánchez (2/2) 48', 61'; Pen: Sánchez (2/3) 3', 73'

Millennium Stadium, Cardiff
Attendance: 50,175
Referee: Angus Gardner (Australia)

Team details

FB	15	Leigh Halfpenny
RW	14	George North
OC	13	Jonathan Davies
IC	12	Scott Williams
LW	11	Liam Williams
FH	10	Dan Biggar
SH	9	Gareth Davies
N8	8	Ross Moriarty
OF	7	Justin Tipuric
BF	6	Sam Warburton
RL	5	Alun Wyn Jones
LL	4	Luke Charteris
TP	3	Tomas Francis
HK	2	Ken Owens	(substituted off) 45'
LP	1	Gethin Jenkins (c)	(substituted off) 62'
Replacements:
HK	16	Scott Baldwin	(substituted on) 45'
PR	17	Nicky Smith	(substituted on) 62'
PR	18	Samson Lee
LK	19	Cory Hill
FL	20	James King
SH	21	Lloyd Williams
FH	22	Gareth Anscombe
CE	23	Jamie Roberts
Coach:
(Wales) Rob Howley

FB	15	Joaquín Tuculet		(substituted off) 35'
RW	14	Matías Moroni
OC	13	Matías Orlando
IC	12	Juan Martín Hernández		(substituted off) 74'
LW	11	Santiago Cordero
FH	10	Nicolás Sánchez
SH	9	Martín Landajo		(substituted off) 62'
N8	8	Facundo Isa
OF	7	Javier Ortega Desio		(substituted off) 39'	(substituted on) 49'
BF	6	Pablo Matera		(substituted off) 62'
RL	5	Matías Alemanno
LL	4	Guido Petti		(substituted off) 58'
TP	3	Ramiro Herrera	(yellow card) 39' to 49'			(substituted off) 70'
HK	2	Agustín Creevy (c)		(substituted off) 65'
LP	1	Lucas Noguera Paz		(substituted off) 49'
Replacements:
HK	16	Julián Montoya		(substituted on) 65'
PR	17	Santiago García Botta		(substituted on) 49'
PR	18	Enrique Pieretto		(substituted on) 39'	(substituted off) 49'	(substituted on) 70'
N8	19	Leonardo Senatore		(substituted on) 62'
FL	20	Tomás Lezana		(substituted on) 58'
SH	21	Tomás Cubelli		(substituted on) 62'
FH	22	Santiago González Iglesias		(substituted on) 74'
CE	23	Jerónimo de la Fuente		(substituted on) 35'
Coach:
(Argentina) Daniel Hourcade

Man of the Match:
Alun Wyn Jones (Wales)

Touch judges:
Mike Fraser (New Zealand)
Luke Pearce (England)
Television match official:
Shaun Davey (England)

Notes:

- Dan Biggar (Wales) earned his 50th test cap.

12 November 2016
19:15 WET (UTC+0)

Ireland	52–21	Canada
Try: Earls 5' c Marshall 21' c O'Halloran (2) 37' m, 77' m Penalty try 44' c Dillane 58' c Marmion 65' c Tracy 80' m Con: Jackson (6/6) 6', 22', 38', 45', 60', 66'	Report	Try: Van der Merwe 23 'c Paris 28' c Evans 56' c Con: McRorie (3/3) 25', 29', 57'

Aviva Stadium, Dublin
Attendance: 43,000
Referee: Marius van der Westhuizen (South Africa)

Team details

FB	15	Tiernan O'Halloran
RW	14	Craig Gilroy	(substituted off) 66'
OC	13	Garry Ringrose
IC	12	Luke Marshall
LW	11	Keith Earls
FH	10	Paddy Jackson	(substituted off) 67'
SH	9	Kieran Marmion	(substituted off) 66'
N8	8	Jack O'Donoghue
OF	7	Seán O'Brien	(substituted off) 67'
BF	6	Peter O'Mahony (c)
RL	5	Billy Holland
LL	4	Ultan Dillane	(substituted off) 72'
TP	3	Finlay Bealham	(substituted off) 47'
HK	2	Seán Cronin	(substituted off) 60'
LP	1	Cian Healy	(substituted off) 56'
Replacements:
HK	16	James Tracy	(substituted on) 60'
PR	17	Dave Kilcoyne	(substituted on) 56'
PR	18	John Ryan	(substituted on) 47'
LK	19	Donnacha Ryan	(substituted on) 72'
FL	20	Dan Leavy	(substituted on) 67'
SH	21	Luke McGrath	(substituted on) 66'
FH	22	Joey Carbery	(substituted on) 67'
WG	23	Niyi Adeolokun	(substituted on) 66'
Coach:
(New Zealand) Joe Schmidt

FB	15	Matt Evans
RW	14	D. T. H. van der Merwe
OC	13	Conor Trainor
IC	12	Ciaran Hearn	(substituted off) 68'
LW	11	Taylor Paris
FH	10	Connor Braid
SH	9	Gordon McRorie	(substituted off) 69'
N8	8	Aaron Carpenter (c)	(substituted off) 45'
OF	7	Lucas Rumball	(substituted off) 66'
BF	6	Kyle Baillie
RL	5	Evan Olmstead
LL	4	Brett Beukeboom
TP	3	Jake Ilnicki	(substituted off) 79'
HK	2	Ray Barkwill	61' to 67'		(substituted off) 75'
LP	1	Djustice Sears-Duru	(substituted off) 70'
Replacements:
HK	16	Eric Howard	(substituted on) 61'-	(substituted off) 67'	(substituted on) 75'
PR	17	Rob Brouwer	(substituted on) 70'
PR	18	Matt Tierney	(substituted on) 79'
FL	19	Admir Cejvanovic	(substituted on) 45'
FL	20	Matt Heaton	(substituted on) 66'
SH	21	Phil Mack	(substituted on) 69'
FH	22	Pat Parfrey
CE	23	Nick Blevins	(substituted on) 68'
Coach:
(New Zealand) Mark Anscombe

Man of the Match:
Ultan Dillane (Ireland)

Touch judges:
Matthew Carley (England)
Thomas Charabas (France)
Television match official:
Tim Hayes (Wales)

Notes:

- Niyi Adeolokun, Billy Holland, Dan Leavy, Jack O'Donoghue, Luke McGrath, Garry Ringrose, John Ryan and James Tracy (all Ireland) and Admir Cejvanovic (Canada) made their international debuts.

13 November 2016
16:00 CLST (UTC-03)

Chile	30–12	South Korea
Try: Larenas 20' c Muñita 37' c Brangier 55' c Con: González (3/3) 21', 38', 56'; Pen: González (3/3) 2', 8', 65'	Report	Try: Sung Min 42' c Yong-heung 61' m Con: Hyuk (1/2) 43'

Estadio San Carlos de Apoquindo, Las Condes
Attendance: 1,500
Referee: Joaquín Montes (Uruguay)

Team details

FB	15	Rodrigo Fernández
RW	14	Tomás Ianiszewski
OC	13	Felipe Brangier		(substituted off) 61'
IC	12	Ricardo Sifri
LW	11	Juan Pablo Larenas
FH	10	Francisco González		(substituted off) 75'
SH	9	Juan Pablo Perrotta		(substituted off) 75'
N8	8	Nikola Bursic		(substituted off) 44'
OF	7	Javier Richard	(yellow card) 71' to 80'
BF	6	Benjamín Soto (c)		(substituted off) 72'
RL	5	Mario Mayol
LL	4	Francisco Hurtado
TP	3	José Tomás Muñita		(substituted off) 75'
HK	2	Manuel Gurruchaga		(substituted off) 41'
LP	1	Claudio Zamorano		(substituted off) 66'
Replacements:
HK	16	Tomás Dussaillant		(substituted on) 41'
PR	17	Álvaro Ide		(substituted on) 66'
PR	18	Lucas Bordigoni		(substituted on) 75'
LK	19	Martín Sigren		(substituted on) 72'
FL	20	Cristóbal Niedmann	(yellow card) 71' to 80'	(substituted on) 44'
SH	21	Beltrán Vergara		(substituted on) 75'
FH	22	Jorge Castillo		(substituted on) 75'
WG	23	Matías Contreras		(substituted on) 61'
Coach:
(France) Bernard Charreyre

FB	15	Chang Yong-heung
RW	14	Jeong Yeon Sik	(substituted off) 49'
OC	13	Jang Sung Min
IC	12	Moon Jung Ho	(substituted off) 55'
LW	11	Park Han Gyul
FH	10	Yoo Jae Hyuk
SH	9	Lee Myung Jun	(substituted off) 64'
N8	8	Park Soon-Chai
OF	7	Choi Kang San	(substituted off) 57'
BF	6	Lee Yong Seung
RL	5	Lee Jin Seok	(substituted off) 77'
LL	4	Yang Dae Yeong	(substituted off) 69'
TP	3	Shin Dong-won (c)	(substituted off) 73'
HK	2	Lim Jun Hee
LP	1	Son Young-ki	(substituted off) 56'
Replacements:
PR	16	Kang Taeh Yun	(substituted on) 56'
FL	17	Yoo-Yi Hoon	(substituted on) 73'
PR	18	Park Jong Yeol	(substituted on) 57'
LK	19	Shin Dahyun	(substituted on) 77'
FL	20	Son Min Su	(substituted on) 69'
SH	21	Shin Ki-chul	(substituted on) 64'
FH	22	Lee Jae Bok	(substituted on) 49'
CE	23	Kim Nam Uk	(substituted on) 55'
Coach:
(New Zealand) John Walters

Touch judges:
Francisco Saavedra (Chile)
Claudio Ruz (Chile)

16 November 2016
19:45 GMT (UTC+0)

Harlequins (England)	10–26	Māori All Blacks
Try: Murphy 51' c Con: Swiel (1/1) 52'; Pen: Swiel (1/1) 7'	Report	Try: Lowe (2) 14' c, 18' c Christie 22' m Wainui 25' c Con: West (3/4) 16', 19', 24'

Twickenham Stoop, London
Attendance: 12,100
Referee: Andrew Brace (Ireland)

Team details

FB	15	(Scotland) Ruaridh Jackson
RW	14	(England) Sam Aspland-Robinson
OC	13	(England) Gabriel Ibitoye
IC	12	(England) Henry Cheeseman
LW	11	(Lithuania) Jonas Mikalcius
FH	10	(South Africa) Tim Swiel	(substituted off) 76'
SH	9	(Wales) Luc Jones	(substituted off) 77'
N8	8	(New Zealand) George Naoupu
OF	7	(England) Archie White	(substituted off) 77'
BF	6	(Samoa) Daniel Leo	(substituted off) 63'
RL	5	(England) Stan South
LL	4	(New Zealand) Mark Reddish
TP	3	(Wales) Adam Jones (c)	(substituted off) 54'
HK	2	(England) Joe Gray	(substituted off) 40'
LP	1	(England) Dan Murphy	(substituted off) 54'
Replacements:
HK	16	(England) Charlie Piper	(substituted on) 40'	(substituted off) 76'
PR	17	(Wales) Owen Evans	(substituted on) 54'
PR	18	(England) Matt Shields	(substituted on) 54'
FL	19	(England) Billy Harding	(substituted on) 77'
FL	20	(England) Alex Bradley	(substituted on) 63'
SH	21	(England) Joshua Davies	(substituted on) 77'
CE	22	(England) Luke Peters		(substituted on) 76'
WG	23	(Samoa) Alofa Alofa	(substituted on) 77'
Coach:
(England) John Kingston

FB	15	James Lowe
RW	14	Ambrose Curtis
OC	13	Matt Proctor
IC	12	Tim Bateman		(substituted off) 53'
LW	11	Sean Wainui
FH	10	Ihaia West		(substituted off) 53'
SH	9	Brad Weber		(substituted off) 72'
N8	8	Akira Ioane
OF	7	Shane Christie		(substituted off) 40'
BF	6	Whetu Douglas
RL	5	Tom Franklin
LL	4	Leighton Price		(substituted off) 69'
TP	3	Ben May		(substituted off) 45'
HK	2	Ash Dixon (c)		(substituted off) 72'
LP	1	Kane Hames		(substituted off) 45'
Replacements:
HK	16	Joe Royal		(substituted on) 72'
PR	17	Chris Eves	(yellow card) 79' to 80'	(substituted on) 45'
PR	18	Marcel Renata		(substituted on) 45'
LK	19	Jacob Skeen		(substituted on) 69'
FL	20	Reed Prinsep		(substituted on) 40'
SH	21	Billy Guyton		(substituted on) 72'
FH	22	Otere Black		(substituted on) 53'
CE	23	Jason Emery		(substituted on) 53'
Coach:
(New Zealand) Colin Cooper

Man of the Match:
Akira Ioane (Māori All Blacks)

Touch judges:
Dean Richards (England)
Paul Dix (England)
Television match official:
David Rose (England)

19 November 2016
15:00 GET (UTC+4)

Georgia	20–16	Samoa
Try: Penalty try 9' c Bitsadze 29' c Con: Kvirikashvili (2/2) 10', 30'; Pen: Kvirikashvili (2/2) 38', 58'	Report	Try: Pisi 20' c Con: Fa'apale (1/1) 21'; Pen: Fa'apale (3/3) 11', 49', 54'

Mikheil Meskhi Stadium, Tbilisi
Attendance: 22,000
Referee: Alexandre Ruiz (France)

Team details

FB	15	Merab Kvirikashvili
RW	14	Tamaz Mchedlidze
OC	13	Giorgi Koshadze	(substituted off) 65'
IC	12	Merab Sharikadze
LW	11	Alexander Todua
FH	10	Lasha Malaghuradze
SH	9	Vasil Lobzhanidze	(substituted off) 67'
N8	8	Beka Bitsadze
OF	7	Mamuka Gorgodze (c)
BF	6	Viktor Kolelishvili	(substituted off) 55'
RL	5	Giorgi Nemsadze
LL	4	Konstantin Mikautadze	(substituted off) 60'
TP	3	Levan Chilachava	(substituted off) 55'
HK	2	Jaba Bregvadze	(substituted off) 72'
LP	1	Mikheil Nariashvili	(substituted off) 49'
Replacements:
HK	16	Badri Alkhazashvili	(substituted on) 72'
PR	17	Karlen Asieshvili	(substituted on) 49'
PR	18	Davit Kubriashvili	(substituted on) 55'
FL	19	Shalva Sutiashvili	(substituted on) 60'
FL	20	Giorgi Tkhilaishvili	(substituted on) 55'
SH	21	Giorgi Begadze	(substituted on) 67'
FH	22	Revaz Jinchvelashvili
WG	23	Giorgi Aptsiauri	(substituted on) 65'
Coach:
(New Zealand) Milton Haig

FB	15	Albert Nikoro
RW	14	Paul Perez
OC	13	George Pisi
IC	12	Rey Lee-Lo
LW	11	David Lemi (c)
FH	10	Patrick Fa'apale	(substituted off) 65'
SH	9	Kahn Fotuali'i
N8	8	Alafoti Fa'osiliva	(substituted off) 65'
OF	7	Greg Foe
BF	6	Jack Lam
RL	5	Filo Paulo	(substituted off) 4'
LL	4	Jeff Lepa
TP	3	Anthony Perenise	(substituted off) 49'
HK	2	Manu Leiataua	(substituted off) 30'
LP	1	Logovi'i Mulipola
Replacements:
HK	16	Elia Elia	(substituted on) 30'
PR	17	Hisa Sasagi	(substituted on) 49'
PR	18	Nephi Leatigaga
LK	19	Talaga Alofipo	(substituted on) 4'
FL	20	Genesis Mamea	(substituted on) 65'
FL	21	Oneone Fa'afou
SH	22	Pele Cowley
FH	23	D'Angelo Leuila	(substituted on) 65'
Coach:
(New Zealand) Alama Ieremia

Man of the Match:
Levan Chilachava (Georgia)

Touch judges:
JP Doyle (England)
Tom Foley (England)
Television match official:
Brian MacNeice (Ireland)

Notes:

- Giorgi Koshadze (Georgia) and Hisa Sasagi (Samoa) made their international debuts.
- Giorgi Begadze (Georgia) earned his 50th test cap.
- This was Georgia's largest winning margin over Samoa, surpassing the 1 point difference set in 2013.

19 November 2016
15:00 CET (UTC+1)

Italy	20–18	South Africa
Try: Van Schalkwyk 11' c Venditti 55' c Con: Canna (2/2) 12', 57'; Pen: Padovani (1/1) 29'; Canna (1/1) 64'	Report	Try: Habana 8' m De Allende 16' c Con: Lambie (1/2) 18'; Pen: Lambie (1/1) 45'; Jantjies (1/1) 60'

Stadio Artemio Franchi, Florence
Attendance: 21,700
Referee: George Clancy (Ireland)

Team details

FB	15	Edoardo Padovani
RW	14	Giulio Bisegni
OC	13	Tommaso Benvenuti
IC	12	Luke McLean
LW	11	Giovanbattista Venditti
FH	10	Carlo Canna		(substituted off) 70'
SH	9	Giorgio Bronzini		(substituted off) 70'
N8	8	Sergio Parisse (c)
OF	7	Simone Favaro
BF	6	Francesco Minto		(substituted off) 59'
RL	5	Dries van Schalkwyk		(substituted off) 27'
LL	4	Marco Fuser	(yellow card) 41' to 51'
TP	3	Lorenzo Cittadini		(substituted off) 40'
HK	2	Ornel Gega
LP	1	Sami Panico		(substituted off) 40'
Replacements:
HK	16	Tommaso D'Apice
PR	17	Nicola Quaglio		(substituted on) 40'
PR	18	Simone Ferrari		(substituted on) 40'
LK	19	George Biagi		(substituted on) 27'
N8	20	Braam Steyn		(substituted on) 59'
SH	21	Edoardo Gori		(substituted on) 70'
FH	22	Tommaso Allan		(substituted on) 70'
CE	23	Tommaso Boni
Coach:
(Ireland) Conor O'Shea

FB	15	Willie le Roux	(substituted off) 74'
RW	14	Ruan Combrinck
OC	13	Francois Venter
IC	12	Damian de Allende
LW	11	Bryan Habana
FH	10	Patrick Lambie	(substituted off) 52'
SH	9	Rudy Paige	(substituted off) 52'
N8	8	Warren Whiteley
OF	7	Willem Alberts	(substituted off) 64'
BF	6	Nizaam Carr
RL	5	Lood de Jager	(substituted off) 70'
LL	4	Pieter-Steph du Toit
TP	3	Vincent Koch	(substituted off) 52'
HK	2	Adriaan Strauss (c)	(substituted off) 76'
LP	1	Tendai Mtawarira	(substituted off) 52'
Replacements:
HK	16	Bongi Mbonambi	(substituted on) 76'
PR	17	Steven Kitshoff	(substituted on) 52'
PR	18	Trevor Nyakane	(substituted on) 52'
LK	19	Franco Mostert	(substituted on) 70'
FL	20	Oupa Mohojé	(substituted on) 64'
SH	21	Faf de Klerk	(substituted on) 52'
FH	22	Elton Jantjies	(substituted on) 52'
FB	23	Johan Goosen	(substituted on) 74'
Coach:
(South Africa) Allister Coetzee

Man of the Match:
Edoardo Padovani (Italy)

Touch judges:
Nigel Owens (Wales)
David Wilkinson (Ireland)
Television match official:
Peter Fitzgibbon (Ireland)

Notes:

- Simone Ferrari and Nicola Quaglio both made their international debuts Italy.
- This was Italy's first ever win over South Africa in 13 attempts, and was Italy's first ever win over one of the big three Southern Hemisphere nations (Australia, New Zealand and South Africa).

19 November 2016
15:00 CET (UTC+1)

Germany	16–6	Brazil
Try: Poppmeier 8' m Otto 61' m Pen: Parkinson (2/3) 19', 52'	Report	Pen: Duque (2/5) 48', 66'

Fritz-Grunebaum-Sportpark, Heidelberg
Attendance: 2,500
Referee: Iñigo Atorrasagasti (Spain)

Team details

FB	15	Harris Aounallah
RW	14	Steffen Liebig
OC	13	Marcel Coetzee
IC	12	Carlos Soteras-Merz
LW	11	Marvin Dieckmann		(substituted off) 36'
FH	10	Raynor Parkinson
SH	9	Tim Menzel
N8	8	Jarrid Els		(substituted off) 43'
OF	7	Adriaan Theisinger	(yellow card) 47' to 57'	(substituted off) 57'
BF	6	Jaco Otto
RL	5	Michael Poppmeier (c)
LL	4	Erik Marks
TP	3	Samy Füchsel		(substituted off) 74'
HK	2	Dasch Barber
LP	1	Julius Nostadt		(substituted off) 74'
Replacements:
HK	16	Dale Garner
PR	17	Jörn Schröder		(substituted on) 74'
PR	18	Chris Howells		(substituted on) 74'
N8	19	Timo Vollenkemper		(substituted on) 57'
FL	20	Sebastian Ferreira		(substituted on) 43'
SH	21	Daniel Koch
CE	22	Oliver Paine
WG	23	Clemens von Grumbkow		(substituted on) 36'
Coach:
(South Africa) Kobus Potgieter

FB	15	Daniel Sancery
RW	14	Mateus Estrela
OC	13	Felipe Sancery
IC	12	Moisés Duque
LW	11	Stefano Giantorno
FH	10	Guilherme Coghetto
SH	9	Johannes Beukes
N8	8	Nick Smith (c)
OF	7	João Luiz da Ros
BF	6	Cleber Dias
RL	5	Gabriel Paganini
LL	4	Lucas Piero
TP	3	Caique Segura
HK	2	Yan Rosetti
LP	1	Jonatas Paulo
Replacements:
HK	16	Daniel Danielewicz
PR	17	Alexandre Alves
PR	18	Wilton Rebolo
LK	19	Joabe Souza
FL	20	Matheus Daniel
SH	21	Bruno Garcia
FH	22	Luan Soares
WG	23	Robert Tenorio (rugby)
Coach:
(Argentina) Rodolfo Ambrosio

Touch judges:
Kilian O'Brien (Germany)
Kathi Pickert (Germany)

19 November 2016
14:30 GMT (UTC+0)

England	58–15	Fiji
Try: Joseph (2) 3' c, 55' c Daly 8' c Rokoduguni (2) 12' m, 64' m Harrison 19' m Launchbury (2) 26' c, 69' m Goode 49' m Con: Farrell (4/6) 4', 9', 27', 50'; Ford (1/3) 56'; Pen: Farrell (1/1) 37'	Report	Try: Nadolo 31' m Nakarawa 40' m Talebula 43' m

Twickenham Stadium, London
Attendance: 81,409
Referee: Marius Mitrea (Italy)

Team details

FB	15	Alex Goode
RW	14	Semesa Rokoduguni
OC	13	Jonathan Joseph	(substituted off) 65'
IC	12	Owen Farrell	(substituted off) 52'
LW	11	Elliot Daly
FH	10	George Ford
SH	9	Ben Youngs	(substituted off) 52'
N8	8	Billy Vunipola
OF	7	Chris Robshaw
BF	6	Teimana Harrison	(substituted off) 47'
RL	5	Courtney Lawes	(substituted off) 65'
LL	4	Joe Launchbury
TP	3	Dan Cole	(substituted off) 57'
HK	2	Dylan Hartley (c)	(substituted off) 51'
LP	1	Mako Vunipola	(substituted off) 51'
Replacements:
HK	16	Jamie George	(substituted on) 51'
PR	17	Joe Marler	(substituted on) 51'
PR	18	Kyle Sinckler	(substituted on) 57'
LK	19	Charlie Ewels	(substituted on) 65'
N8	20	Nathan Hughes	(substituted on) 47'
SH	21	Danny Care	(substituted on) 52'
CE	22	Ben Te'o	(substituted on) 52'
CE	23	Henry Slade	(substituted on) 65'
Coach:
(Australia) Eddie Jones

FB	15	Metuisela Talebula
RW	14	Benito Masilevu	(substituted off) 60'
OC	13	Asaeli Tikoirotuma
IC	12	Albert Vulivuli
LW	11	Nemani Nadolo
FH	10	Josh Matavesi
SH	9	Serupepeli Vularika	(substituted off) 40'
N8	8	Akapusi Qera (c)	(substituted off) 58'
OF	7	Peceli Yato
BF	6	Dominiko Waqaniburotu	(substituted off) 77'
RL	5	Leone Nakarawa
LL	4	Api Ratuniyarawa	(substituted off) 53'
TP	3	Manasa Saulo	(substituted off) 65'
HK	2	Sunia Koto	(substituted off) 51'
LP	1	Campese Ma’afu	(substituted off) 5'
Replacements:
HK	16	Tuapati Talemaitoga	(substituted on) 51'
PR	17	Peni Ravai	(substituted on) 5'
PR	18	Lee-roy Atalifo	(substituted on) 65'
LK	19	Nemia Soqeta	(substituted on) 53'
FL	20	Naulia Dawai	(substituted on) 58'
FL	21	Eremasi Radrodro	(substituted on) 77'
SH	22	Niko Matawalu	(substituted on) 40'
FB	23	Kini Murimurivalu	(substituted on) 60'
Coach:
(New Zealand) John McKee

Man of the Match:
Semesa Rokoduguni (England)

Touch judges:
Paul Williams (New Zealand)
Lloyd Linton (Scotland)
Television match official:
Gareth Simmonds (Wales)

Notes:

- Charlie Ewels (England) made his international debut.
- Sunia Koto (Fiji) earned his 50th test cap.

19 November 2016
14:30 GMT (UTC+0)

Wales	33–30	Japan
Try: Lydiate 10' c Roberts 22' c Warburton 51'; Con: Halfpenny (3/3) 12', 23', 52'; Pen: Halfpenny (3/3) 42', 59', 69'; Drop: S. Davies (1/1) 79'	Report	Try: Yamada 37' c Fukuoka 54' c Lotoahea 73' c Con: Lafaele (1/1) 38'; Tamura (2/2) 56' c, 74'; Pen: Tamura (3/4) 4', 8', 62'

Millennium Stadium, Cardiff
Attendance: 73,969
Referee: Marius van der Westhuizen (South Africa)

Team details

FB	15	Liam Williams	(yellow card) 7' to 17'
RW	14	Leigh Halfpenny
OC	13	Jonathan Davies
IC	12	Jamie Roberts
LW	11	Alex Cuthbert
FH	10	Gareth Anscombe		(substituted off) 67'
SH	9	Lloyd Williams		(substituted off) 50'
N8	8	James King
OF	7	Sam Warburton (c)
BF	6	Dan Lydiate
RL	5	Alun Wyn Jones
LL	4	Cory Hill		(substituted off) 61'
TP	3	Samson Lee		(substituted off) 67'
HK	2	Scott Baldwin
LP	1	Nicky Smith		(substituted off) 67'
Replacements:
HK	16	Kristian Dacey
PR	17	Rhys Gill		(substituted on) 67'
PR	18	Scott Andrews		(substituted on) 67'
LK	19	Jake Ball		(substituted on) 61'
FL	20	Ross Moriarty
SH	21	Gareth Davies		(substituted on) 50'
FH	22	Sam Davies		(substituted on) 67'
WG	23	Keelan Giles
Coach:
(Wales) Rob Howley

FB	15	Kotaro Matsushima
RW	14	Akihito Yamada			(substituted off) 73'
OC	13	Timothy Lafaele
IC	12	Harumichi Tatekawa (c)
LW	11	Kenki Fukuoka
FH	10	Yu Tamura	(substituted off) 32'	(substituted on) 39'
SH	9	Fumiaki Tanaka	(substituted off) 76'
N8	8	Amanaki Mafi
OF	7	Shunsuke Nunomaki	(substituted off) 59'
BF	6	Malgene Ilaua	(substituted off) 67'
RL	5	Samuela Anise	(substituted off) 51'
LL	4	Kyosuke Kajikawa
TP	3	Kensuke Hatakeyama	(substituted off) 51'
HK	2	Shota Horie	(substituted off) 59'
LP	1	Satoshi Nakatani	(substituted off) 51'
Replacements:
HK	16	Takeshi Hino	(substituted on) 59'
PR	17	Koki Yamamoto	(substituted on) 51'
PR	18	Heiichiro Ito	(substituted on) 51'
FL	19	Uwe Helu	(substituted on) 51'
FL	20	Shuhei Matsuhashi	(substituted on) 51'
FL	21	Yuhimaru Mimura	(substituted on) 67'
SH	22	Keisuke Uchida	(substituted on) 76'
FB	23	Amanaki Lotoahea	(substituted on) 32'	(substituted off) 39'	(substituted on) 73'
Coach:
(New Zealand) Jamie Joseph

Man of the Match:
Amanaki Mafi (Japan)

Touch judges:
John Lacey (Ireland)
Craig Maxwell-Keys (England)
Television match official:
Eric Gauzins (France)

Notes:

- Takeshi Hino (Japan) made his international debut.

19 November 2016
16:00 CET (UTC+1)

Spain	33–16	Uruguay
Try: Barthere (2) 26' m, 40' c Jorba 53' c Contardi 62' m Con: Linklater (2/4) 40', 54'; Pen: Linklater (3/3) 3', 24', 44'	Report (in Spanish)	Try: Gattas 71' c Con: Ormaechea (1/1) 72'; Pen: Etcheverry (3/3) 9', 16', 31'

Estadio Ciudad de Málaga, Málaga
Attendance: 10,000
Referee: Federico Anselmi (Argentina)

Team details

FB	15	Brad Linklater
RW	14	Ignacio Contardi
OC	13	Fabien Perrin
IC	12	Alvar Gimeno	(yellow card) 15' to 25'	(substituted off) 70'
LW	11	Jordi Jorba		(substituted off) 76'
FH	10	Mathieu Bélie
SH	9	Juan Ramos		(substituted off) 53'
N8	8	Jaime Nava de Olano (c)	(red card) 80'
OF	7	Gauthier Gibouin
BF	6	Pierre Barthere
RL	5	David González		(substituted off) 51'
LL	4	David Barrera Howarth
TP	3	Jesús Moreno		(substituted off) 57'
HK	2	Beñat Auzqui		(substituted off) 61'
LP	1	Fernando Martin López Perez		(substituted off) 55'
Replacements:
HK	16	Joe Hutchinson		(substituted on) 55'
PR	17	Juan Anaya Lazaro		(substituted on) 61'
PR	18	Xerom Civil		(substituted on) 57'
N8	19	Carlos Gavidi		(substituted on) 51'	(substituted off) 61'
FL	20	Mathew Foulds		(substituted on) 61'
SH	21	Facundo Munilla		(substituted on) 53'
CE	22	Federico Castiglioni		(substituted on) 70'
WG	23	Arturo Iñiguez		(substituted on) 76'
Coach:
(Spain) Santiago Santos

FB	15	Rodrigo Silva
RW	14	Santiago Arata		(substituted off) 61'
OC	13	Santiago Gibernau		(substituted off) 48'
IC	12	Nicolás Freitas
LW	11	Andrés Rocco
FH	10	Jerónimo Etcheverry		(substituted off) 53'
SH	9	Agustín Ormaechea
N8	8	Gonzalo Soto
OF	7	Franco Lamanna	(yellow card) 42' to 52'
BF	6	Juan Manuel Gaminara (c)	(red card) 80'
RL	5	Ignacio Dotti
LL	4	Diego Magno
TP	3	Mario Sagario		(substituted off) 48'
HK	2	Carlos Arboleya		(substituted off) 48'
LP	1	Mateo Sanguinetti
Replacements:
PR	16	Ignacio Secco
HK	17	Facundo Gattas		(substituted on) 48'
PR	18	Juan Echeverría		(substituted on) 48'
LK	19	Diego Ayala
N8	20	Santiago Hernández
SH	21	Guillermo Lijtenstein		(substituted on) 53'
FH	22	Manuel Blengio		(substituted on) 61'
CE	23	Juan Manuel Cat		(substituted on) 48'
Coach:
(Argentina) Esteban Meneses

Touch judges:
Dan Jones (Wales)
Craig Evans (Wales)

Notes:

- Arturo Iniguez and Juan Ramos (both Spain) made their international debuts.

19 November 2016
18:00 EET (UTC+2)

Romania	21–16	Canada
Try: Vlaicu 12' c Dumitru 24' m Con: Vlaicu (1/2) 13'; Pen: Vlaicu (3/4) 4', 31', 54'	Report	Try: Mack 74' c Con: Braid (1/1) 75'; Pen: McRorie (3/3) 2', 15', 60'

Stadionul Arcul de Triumf, Bucharest
Attendance: 4,900
Referee: Shuhei Kubo (Japan)

Team details

FB	15	Cătălin Fercu
RW	14	Tangimana Fonovai
OC	13	Jack Umaga	(substituted off) 70'
IC	12	Florin Popa
LW	11	Ionuț Dumitru
FH	10	Florin Vlaicu
SH	9	Florin Surugiu	(substituted off) 69'
N8	8	Andrei Gorcioaia
OF	7	Stelian Burcea (c)
BF	6	Viorel Lucaci	(substituted off) 77'
RL	5	Marius Antonescu	(substituted off) 61'
LL	4	Johan van Heerden
TP	3	Alexandru Țăruș	(substituted off) 46'
HK	2	Eugen Căpățână	(substituted off) 63'
LP	1	Mihai Lazăr	(substituted off) 73'
Replacements:
HK	16	Andrei Rădoi	(substituted on) 63'
PR	17	Ionel Badiu	(substituted on) 73'
PR	18	Alexandru Gordaș	(substituted on) 46'
LK	19	Valentin Popârlan	(substituted on) 61'
FL	20	Cristi Chirica	(substituted on) 77'
SH	21	Valentin Calafeteanu	(substituted on) 69'
WG	22	Nicolas Onutu
WG	23	Stephen Shennan	(substituted on) 70'
Coach:
(Wales) Lynn Howells

FB	15	Matt Evans	(substituted off) 73'
RW	14	D. T. H. van der Merwe (c)
OC	13	Conor Trainor	(substituted off) 55'
IC	12	Ben LeSage
LW	11	Taylor Paris
FH	10	Connor Braid
SH	9	Gordon McRorie	(substituted off) 61'
N8	8	Admir Cejvanovic
OF	7	Matt Heaton
BF	6	Kyle Baillie	(substituted off) 25'
RL	5	Evan Olmstead
LL	4	Brett Beukeboom
TP	3	Jake Ilnicki	(substituted off) 73'
HK	2	Ray Barkwill
LP	1	Djustice Sears-Duru	(substituted off) 55'
Replacements:
HK	16	Eric Howard
PR	17	Rob Brouwer	(substituted on) 55'
PR	18	Ryan Kotlewski	(substituted on) 73'
LK	19	Conor Keys
N8	20	Clay Panga	(substituted on) 25'
SH	21	Phil Mack	(substituted on) 61'
FH	22	Pat Parfrey	(substituted on) 73'
CE	23	Ciaran Hearn	(substituted on) 55'
Coach:
(New Zealand) Mark Anscombe

Touch judges:
Luke Pearce (England)
Gary Conway (Ireland)
Television match official:
Stefano Pennè (Italy)

Notes:

- Cristi Chirica (Romania) made his international debut.

19 November 2016
17:00 CET (UTC+1)

Tonga	20–17	United States
Try: Veainu 11' c Vainikolo 23' c Con: Takulua (2/2) 11', 24'; Pen: Takulua (2/2) 40', 63'	Report	Try: Iosefo 38' c Taufete'e 52' c Con: Holder (2/2) 39', 52'; Pen: Holder (1/1) 16'

Anoeta Stadium, San Sebastián, Spain
Attendance: 12,500
Referee: Nick Briant (New Zealand)

Team details

FB	15	Telusa Veainu		(substituted off) 40'
RW	14	Nafi Tuitavake
OC	13	Siale Piutau (c)		(substituted off) 56'
IC	12	Latiume Fosita
LW	11	Fetuʻu Vainikolo
FH	10	Kali Hala
SH	9	Sonatane Takulua
N8	8	Tevita Koloamatangi		(substituted off) 74'
OF	7	Jack Ram
BF	6	Daniel Faleafa			(substituted off) 74'
RL	5	Joe Tuineau
LL	4	Steve Mafi
TP	3	Siua Halanukonuka		(substituted off) 53'	(substituted on) 74'
HK	2	Paul Ngauamo		(substituted off) 60'
LP	1	Tevita Mailau		(substituted off) 53'
Replacements:
HK	16	Elvis Taione		(substituted on) 60'
PR	17	Paea Faʻanunu		(substituted on) 53'
PR	18	Sila Puafisi	(yellow card) 70' to 80'	(substituted on) 53'
FL	19	Valentino Mapapalangi		(substituted on) 74'
FL	20	Kotoni Ale		(substituted on) 56'
SH	21	Tomasi Palu
CE	22	Tevita Taufuʻi
FB	23	David Halaifonua		(substituted on) 40'
Coach:
(Australia) Toutai Kefu

FB	15	Madison Hughes
RW	14	Blaine Scully (c)
OC	13	Thretton Palamo	(substituted off) 64'
IC	12	Marcel Brache
LW	11	Martin Iosefo
FH	10	Will Holder	(substituted off) 68'
SH	9	Nate Augspurger
N8	8	Andrew Durutalo	(substituted off) 74'
OF	7	Tony Lamborn
BF	6	Samu Manoa	(substituted off) 54'
RL	5	Nick Civetta
LL	4	Cam Dolan
TP	3	Chris Baumann
HK	2	James Hilterbrand
LP	1	Joe Taufete'e
Replacements:
HK	16	Pat Blair
PR	17	Angus MacLellan
PR	18	Dino Waldren
FL	19	Alastair McFarland	(substituted on) 74'
N8	20	Langilangi Haupeakui	(substituted on) 54'
SH	21	Mike Te'o	(substituted on) 68'
WG	22	Matai Leuta	(substituted on) 64'
CE	23	JP Eloff
Coach:
(New Zealand) John Mitchell

Touch judges:
Alhambra Nievas (Spain)
Iñigo Atorrasagasti (Spain)
Television match official:
Carlo Damasco (Italy)

Notes:

- Marcel Brache (United States) made his international debut.

19 November 2016
17:00 GMT (UTC+0)

Scotland	19–16	Argentina
Try: Maitland 54' c Con: Laidlaw (1/1) 55'; Pen: Laidlaw (4/4) 3', 28', 68', 80+3'	Report	Try: Orlando 50' c Con: Sánchez (1/1) 51'; Pen: Sánchez (3/3) 39', 44', 63'

Murrayfield Stadium, Edinburgh
Attendance: 50,481
Referee: Ben O'Keeffe (New Zealand)

Team details

FB	15	Stuart Hogg
RW	14	Sean Maitland
OC	13	Huw Jones	(substituted off) 58'
IC	12	Alex Dunbar
LW	11	Tommy Seymour
FH	10	Finn Russell
SH	9	Greig Laidlaw (c)
N8	8	John Barclay
OF	7	Hamish Watson
BF	6	Magnus Bradbury	(substituted off) 51'
RL	5	Jonny Gray
LL	4	Grant Gilchrist	(substituted off) 71'
TP	3	Zander Fagerson	(substituted off) 51'
HK	2	Fraser Brown	(substituted off) 22'	(substituted on) 34'	(substituted off) 68'
LP	1	Allan Dell	(substituted off) 74'
Replacements:
HK	16	Ross Ford	(substituted on) 22'	(substituted off) 34'	(substituted on) 68'
PR	17	Alex Allan	(substituted on) 74'
PR	18	Moray Low	(substituted on) 51'
LK	19	Tim Swinson	(substituted on) 71'
N8	20	Ryan Wilson	(substituted on) 51'
SH	21	Ali Price
FH	22	Peter Horne	(substituted on) 58'	(substituted off) 79'
WG	23	Tim Visser		(substituted on) 79'
Coach:
(New Zealand) Vern Cotter

FB	15	Joaquín Tuculet
RW	14	Matías Moroni	(substituted off) 74'
OC	13	Matías Orlando	(substituted off) 71'
IC	12	Juan Martín Hernández
LW	11	Santiago Cordero
FH	10	Nicolás Sánchez
SH	9	Martín Landajo	(substituted off) 58'
N8	8	Facundo Isa	(substituted off) 57'
OF	7	Javier Ortega Desio
BF	6	Pablo Matera
RL	5	Matías Alemanno
LL	4	Guido Petti	(substituted off) 71'
TP	3	Ramiro Herrera	(substituted off) 71'
HK	2	Agustín Creevy (c)	(substituted off) 71'
LP	1	Lucas Noguera Paz	(substituted off) 71'
Replacements:
HK	16	Julián Montoya	(substituted on) 71'
PR	17	Santiago García Botta	(substituted on) 71'
PR	18	Enrique Pieretto	(substituted on) 71'
N8	19	Leonardo Senatore	(substituted on) 57'
FL	20	Juan Manuel Leguizamón	(substituted on) 71'
SH	21	Tomás Cubelli	(substituted on) 58'
CE	22	Jerónimo de la Fuente	(substituted on) 74'
CE	23	Juan Pablo Estelles	(substituted on) 71'
Coach:
(Argentina) Daniel Hourcade

Man of the Match:
Jonny Gray (Scotland)

Touch judges:
Jérôme Garcès (France)
Thomas Charabas (France)
Television match official:
Shaun Davey (England)

Notes:

- Magnus Bradbury (Scotland) made his international debut.
- Nicolás Sánchez (Argentina) earned his 50th test cap.
- This is the first time that Scotland has won three matches in a row against Argentina.

19 November 2016
17:30 WET (UTC+0)

Ireland	9–21	New Zealand
Pen: Sexton (1/1) 9'; Jackson (2/2) 24', 57'	Report	Try: Fekitoa (2) 2' c, 65' c B. Barrett 13' c Con: B. Barrett (3/3) 4', 14', 66'

Aviva Stadium, Dublin
Attendance: 51,000
Referee: Jaco Peyper (South Africa)

Team details

FB	15	Rob Kearney
RW	14	Andrew Trimble
OC	13	Jared Payne
IC	12	Robbie Henshaw	(substituted off) 10'
LW	11	Simon Zebo	(substituted off) 72'
FH	10	Johnny Sexton	(substituted off) 17'
SH	9	Conor Murray
N8	8	Jamie Heaslip
OF	7	Seán O'Brien
BF	6	CJ Stander	(substituted off) 21'
RL	5	Devin Toner
LL	4	Donnacha Ryan	(substituted off) 57'
TP	3	Tadhg Furlong	(substituted off) 67'
HK	2	Rory Best (c)	(substituted off) 67'
LP	1	Jack McGrath	(substituted off) 57'
Replacements:
HK	16	Seán Cronin	(substituted on) 67'
PR	17	Cian Healy	(substituted on) 57'
PR	18	Finlay Bealham	(substituted on) 67'
LK	19	Iain Henderson	(substituted on) 57'
FL	20	Josh van der Flier	(substituted on) 21'
SH	21	Kieran Marmion	(substituted on) 72'
FH	22	Paddy Jackson	(substituted on) 17'
CE	23	Garry Ringrose	(substituted on) 10'
Coach:
(New Zealand) Joe Schmidt

FB	15	Ben Smith		(substituted off) 72'
RW	14	Israel Dagg
OC	13	Malakai Fekitoa	(yellow card) 48' to 58'
IC	12	Anton Lienert-Brown
LW	11	Julian Savea		(substituted off) 57'
FH	10	Beauden Barrett
SH	9	Aaron Smith	(yellow card) 17' to 27'	(substituted off) 51'
N8	8	Kieran Read (c)
OF	7	Sam Cane		(substituted off) 17'
BF	6	Liam Squire		(substituted off) 67'
RL	5	Sam Whitelock
LL	4	Brodie Retallick
TP	3	Owen Franks		(substituted off) 51'
HK	2	Dane Coles		(substituted off) 67'
LP	1	Joe Moody		(substituted off) 48'
Replacements:
HK	16	Codie Taylor		(substituted on) 67'
PR	17	Wyatt Crockett		(substituted on) 48'
PR	18	Charlie Faumuina		(substituted on) 51'
LK	19	Scott Barrett		(substituted on) 67'
FL	20	Ardie Savea		(substituted on) 17'
SH	21	TJ Perenara		(substituted on) 57'
FH	22	Aaron Cruden		(substituted on) 57'
WG	23	Waisake Naholo		(substituted on) 72'
Coach:
(New Zealand) Steve Hansen

Man of the Match:
Beauden Barrett (New Zealand)

Touch judges:
Mathieu Raynal (France)
Ian Davies (Wales)
Television match official:
Jon Mason (Wales)

19 November 2016
21:00 CET (UTC+1)

France	23–25	Australia
Try: Vakatawa 16' m Doussain 52' m Fofana 66' c Con: Machenaud (1/3) 65'; Pen: Machenaud (2/3) 5', 40'	Report	Try: Penalty try 23' c Foley 42' c Kuridrani 57' m Con: Foley (2/3) 24, 44'; Pen: Foley (2/2) 21', 36'

Stade de France, Saint-Denis
Attendance: 80,000
Referee: Glen Jackson (New Zealand)

Team details

FB	15	Scott Spedding	(substituted off) 29'	(substituted on) 36'
RW	14	Noa Nakaitaci
OC	13	Rémi Lamerat	(substituted off) 67'
IC	12	Wesley Fofana
LW	11	Virimi Vakatawa
FH	10	Jean-Marc Doussain			(substituted off) 43'	(substituted on) 50'	(substituted off) 56'
SH	9	Maxime Machenaud	(substituted off) 73'
N8	8	Louis Picamoles	(substituted off) 70'
OF	7	Kevin Gourdon
BF	6	Charles Ollivon
RL	5	Yoann Maestri
LL	4	Sébastien Vahaamahina	(substituted off) 63'
TP	3	Uini Atonio	(substituted off) 63'
HK	2	Guilhem Guirado (c)	(substituted off) 63'
LP	1	Cyril Baille	(substituted off) 63'
Replacements:
HK	16	Camille Chat	(substituted on) 63'
PR	17	Xavier Chiocci	(substituted on) 63'
PR	18	Rabah Slimani	(substituted on) 63'
LK	19	Julien Le Devedec	(substituted on) 63'
N8	20	Damien Chouly	(substituted on) 70'
SH	21	Baptiste Serin	(substituted on) 73'
FH	22	Camille Lopez	(substituted on) 29'	(substituted off) 36'	(substituted on) 43'	(substituted off) 50'	(substituted on) 56'
CE	23	Gaël Fickou	(substituted on) 67'
Coach:
(France) Guy Novès

FB	15	Luke Morahan
RW	14	Sefa Naivalu
OC	13	Tevita Kuridrani
IC	12	Kyle Godwin
LW	11	Henry Speight
FH	10	Bernard Foley
SH	9	Will Genia	(substituted off) 77'
N8	8	Sean McMahon	(substituted off) 67'
OF	7	David Pocock (c)
BF	6	Scott Fardy
RL	5	Rob Simmons
LL	4	Kane Douglas	(substituted off) 69'
TP	3	Allan Alaalatoa	(substituted off) 69'
HK	2	Tolu Latu	(substituted off) 64'
LP	1	James Slipper	(substituted off) 63'
Replacements:
HK	16	Stephen Moore	(substituted on) 64'
PR	17	Scott Sio	(substituted on) 63'
PR	18	Tom Robertson	(substituted on) 69'
LK	19	Will Skelton	(substituted on) 69'
FL	20	Dean Mumm	(substituted on) 67'
SH	21	Nick Phipps	(substituted on) 77'
FH	22	Jono Lance
WG	23	Taqele Naiyaravoro
Coach:
(Australia) Michael Cheika

Touch judges:
Matthew Carley (England)
Greg Garner (England)
Television match official:
Graham Hughes (England)

Notes:

- Yoann Maestri (France) earned his 50th test cap.
- Kyle Godwin (Australia) made his international debut.
- This was Australia's first win over France in France since their 59–16 win in 2010
- Australia reclaimed the Trophée des Bicentenaires for the first time since 2014.

19 November 2016
18:00 CLST (UTC-03)

Chile	36–38	South Korea
Try: Bursic 7' c Brangier 17' c Ianiszewski (3) 23' c, 42' m, 56' m Fernández 47' m Con: González (3/6) 8', 18', 23'	Report	Try: Kang San 44' c Hee 59' c Gyul (3) 69' m, 72' c, 79' m Bok 80' c Con: Ryu (4/6) 45', 59', 73', 80'

Old Grangonian Club, Santiago
Referee: Pablo de Lucca (Argentina)

Team details

FB	15	Rodrigo Fernández	(substituted off) 72'
RW	14	Tomás Ianiszewski
OC	13	Felipe Brangier
IC	12	Ricardo Sifri	(substituted off) 65'
LW	11	Juan Pablo Larenas	(substituted off) 28'
FH	10	Francisco González
SH	9	Beltrán Vergara	(substituted off) 63'
N8	8	Nikola Bursic	(substituted off) 59'
OF	7	Javier Richard (c)
BF	6	Cristóbal Niedmann
RL	5	Mario Mayol
LL	4	Francisco Hurtado
TP	3	José Tomás Muñita	(substituted off) 55'
HK	2	Tomás Dussaillant
LP	1	Claudio Zamorano	(substituted off) 57'
Replacements:
HK	16	Sebastián Parra
PR	17	Iñaki Gurruchaga	(substituted on) 57'
PR	18	Lucas Bordigoni	(substituted on) 55'
LK	19	Martín Sigren	(substituted on) 72'
FL	20	Eduardo Orpis	(substituted on) 59'
SH	21	Juan Pablo Perrotta	(substituted on) 63'
WG	22	Pedro Verschae	(substituted on) 65'
FB	23	Pablo Casas	(substituted on) 28'
Coach:
(France) Bernard Charreyre

FB	15	Chang Yong-heung
RW	14	Jeong Yeon Sik
OC	13	Jang Sung Min
IC	12	Kim Nam Uk	(substituted off) 28'
LW	11	Park Han Gyul
FH	10	Lee Jae Bok
SH	9	Shin Ki-chul	(substituted off) 21'
N8	8	Park Soon-Chai
OF	7	Choi Kang San	(substituted off) 55'
BF	6	Lee Yong Seung
RL	5	Lee Jin Seok
LL	4	Yang Dae Yeong	(substituted off) 65'
TP	3	Shin Dong-won (c)	(substituted off) 41'
HK	2	Kim Jeep
LP	1	Son Young-ki
Replacements:
PR	16	Kang Taeh Yun
PR	17	Park Jong Yeol	(substituted on) 41'
HK	18	Lim Jun Hee	(substituted on) 55'
LK	19	Min-Soo Son
FL	20	Yoo Ji-hoon	(substituted on) 65'
SH	21	Lee Myung Jun	(substituted on) 21'
FH	22	Jae-Hyuk Ryu	(substituted on) 28'
CE	23	Moon Jung Ho
Coach:
(New Zealand) John Walters

Touch judges:
Luis Díaz (Chile)
Frank Méndez (Chile)

24 November 2016
20:45 CET (UTC+1)

French Barbarians	19–11	Australia A
Try: Lakafia 76' c Con: Dumora (1/1) 77'; Pen: Lonca (1/1) 29'; Dumora (3/3) 53', 61', 69'	Report	Try: Mowen 2' m Pen: Frisby (1/1) 9'; Godwin (1/1) 75'

Stade Chaban-Delmas, Bordeaux
Attendance: 30,028
Referee: Juan Sylvestre (Argentina)

25 November 2016
20:00 CET (UTC+1)

Samoa	25–23	Canada
Try: Perez 8' c Con: Leuila (1/1) 9'; Pen: Leuila (4/4) 14', 24', 50', 73'; Drop: Leuila (2/3) 10', 68'	Report	Try: Olmstead 58' m Van der Merwe (2) 64' m, 79' c Con: Braid (1/3) 79'; Pen: Braid (2/2) 16', 27'

Stade des Alpes, Grenoble, France
Attendance: 12,000
Referee: Luke Pearce (England)

Team details

FB	15	Albert Nikoro		(substituted off) 71'
RW	14	Ken Pisi
OC	13	Paul Perez
IC	12	Winston Stanley		(substituted off) 68'
LW	11	David Lemi (c)
FH	10	D'Angelo Leuila		(substituted off) 73'
SH	9	Kahn Fotuali'i
N8	8	Genesis Mamea		(substituted off) 71'
OF	7	Greg Foe
BF	6	Alafoti Fa'osiliva
RL	5	Jeff Lepa
LL	4	Taiasina Tuifu'a	(yellow card) 56' to 66'
TP	3	Logovi'i Mulipola		(substituted off) 51'
HK	2	Elia Elia		(substituted off) 58'
LP	1	Sakaria Taulafo		(substituted off) 71'
Replacements:
HK	16	Seilala Lam		(substituted on) 58'
PR	17	Nephi Leatigaga		(substituted on) 71'
PR	18	Census Johnston		(substituted on) 51'
LK	19	Talaga Alofipo
FL	20	Oneone Fa'afou		(substituted on) 71'
SH	21	Danny Tusitala		(substituted on) 73'
CE	22	Ope Peleseuma		(substituted on) 68'
FB	23	Ahsee Tuala		(substituted on) 71'
Coach:
(New Zealand) Alama Ieremia

FB	15	Matt Evans
RW	14	D. T. H. van der Merwe (c)
OC	13	Ciaran Hearn
IC	12	Nick Blevins
LW	11	Conor Trainor
FH	10	Connor Braid
SH	9	Phil Mack
N8	8	Admir Cejvanovic
OF	7	Matt Heaton
BF	6	Evan Olmstead
RL	5	Brett Beukeboom
LL	4	Jamie Cudmore	(yellow card) 62' to 72'
TP	3	Jake Ilnicki
HK	2	Ray Barkwill
LP	1	Rob Brouwer		(substituted off) 51'
Replacements:
HK	16	Eric Howard
PR	17	Djustice Sears-Duru		(substituted on) 51'
PR	18	Matt Tierney
LK	19	Conor Keys
N8	20	Clay Panga
SH	21	Andrew Ferguson
FH	22	Pat Parfrey
CE	23	Ben LeSage
Coach:
(New Zealand) Mark Anscombe

Touch judges:
David Wilkinson (Ireland)
Gary Conway (Ireland)

Notes:

- Nephi Leatigaga and Ope Peleseuma (both Samoa) made their international debut.

26 November 2016
14:30 CET (UTC+1)

Germany	36–14	Brazil

Bruno-Plache-Stadion, Leipzig
Attendance: 2,600
Referee: Maxime Burlet (Belgium)

26 November 2016
15:00 CET (UTC+1)

Italy	17–19	Tonga
Try: Cittadini 12' c Allan 54' c Con: Canna (1/1) 13'; Allan (1/1) 55'; Pen: Padovani (1/1) 77'	Report	Try: Piutau 51' c Con: Takulua (1/1) 53'; Pen: Takulua (4/5) 32', 45', 77', 80'

Stadio Euganeo, Padua
Attendance: 18,125
Referee: John Lacey (Ireland)

Team details

FB	15	Edoardo Padovani
RW	14	Giulio Bisegni
OC	13	Tommaso Benvenuti
IC	12	Luke McLean
LW	11	Giovanbattista Venditti
FH	10	Carlo Canna		(substituted off) 53'
SH	9	Giorgio Bronzini		(substituted off) 53'
N8	8	Dries van Schalkwyk
OF	7	Simone Favaro (c)
BF	6	Francesco Minto		(substituted off) 43'	(substituted on) 49'	(substituted off) 70'
RL	5	Marco Fuser
LL	4	Quintin Geldenhuys		(substituted off) 47'
TP	3	Lorenzo Cittadini		(substituted off) 40'
HK	2	Ornel Gega
LP	1	Sami Panico	(yellow card) 40' to 50'		(substituted off) 49'
Replacements:
HK	16	Tommaso D'Apice
PR	17	Nicola Quaglio		(substituted on) 43'
PR	18	Simone Ferrari		(substituted on) 40'
LK	19	George Biagi		(substituted on) 47'
N8	20	Braam Steyn		(substituted on) 70'
SH	21	Edoardo Gori		(substituted on) 53'
FH	22	Tommaso Allan	(yellow card) 71' to 80'	(substituted on) 53'
CE	23	Michele Campagnaro
Coach:
(Ireland) Conor O'Shea

FB	15	David Halaifonua		(substituted off) 61'
RW	14	Nafi Tuitavake
OC	13	Siale Piutau (c)
IC	12	Latiume Fosita
LW	11	Fetuʻu Vainikolo
FH	10	Kali Hala
SH	9	Sonatane Takulua
N8	8	Tevita Koloamatangi		(substituted off) 20'
OF	7	Jack Ram
BF	6	Daniel Faleafa
RL	5	Joe Tuineau
LL	4	Steve Mafi
TP	3	Siua Halanukonuka		(substituted off) 53'
HK	2	Paul Ngauamo		(substituted off) 61'
LP	1	Tevita Mailau		(substituted off) 53'
Replacements:
HK	16	Elvis Taione
PR	17	Paea Faʻanunu		(substituted on) 53'
PR	18	Sila Puafisi		(substituted on) 53'
FL	19	Valentino Mapapalangi	(yellow card) 23' to 33'	(substituted on) 20'
FL	20	Kotoni Ale
SH	21	Tomasi Palu		(substituted on) 61'
CE	22	Tevita Taufuʻi
WG	23	Cooper Vuna		(substituted on) 61'
Coach:
(Australia) Toutai Kefu

Man of the Match:
Luke McLean (Italy)

Touch judges:
Alexandre Ruiz (France)
Andrew Brace (Ireland)
Television match official:
Jon Mason (Wales)

Notes:

- This was Tonga's first win over Italy since winning 28–25 during the 1999 Rugby World Cup.
- This was Tonga's fifth ever win over a tier 1 nation, their first since beating Scotland 21–15 in 2012.
- Cooper Vuna made his Tongan international debut, having previously earned 2 international caps for Australia.

26 November 2016
15:10 CET (UTC+1)

Fiji	38–25	Japan
Try: Vulivuli 14' c Talebula 21' c Botia (2) 34' c, 42' c Nadolo 50' c Con: Nadolo (5/5) 15', 22', 35', 43', 51'; Pen: Nadolo (1/3) 80'	Report	Try: Matsushima (2) 57' c, 77' c Ilaua 63' m Con: Tamura (2/3) 57', 77'; Pen: Tamura (2/2) 19', 32'

Stade de la Rabine, Vannes, France
Attendance: 7,500
Referee: Craig Joubert (South Africa)

Team details

FB	15	Kini Murimurivalu
RW	14	Metuisela Talebula
OC	13	Albert Vulivuli
IC	12	Levani Botia			(substituted off) 73'
LW	11	Nemani Nadolo
FH	10	Ben Volavola
SH	9	Niko Matawalu			(substituted off) 78'
N8	8	Akapusi Qera (c)
OF	7	Peceli Yato	(yellow card) 17' to 27'	(yellow card) 31' (red card)
BF	6	Dominiko Waqaniburotu			(substituted off) 60'
RL	5	Leone Nakarawa
LL	4	Nemia Soqeta			(substituted off) 54'
TP	3	Manasa Saulo			(substituted off) 64'
HK	2	Sunia Koto			(substituted off) 56'
LP	1	Peni Ravai			(substituted on) 75'
Replacements:
HK	16	Tuapati Talemaitoga			(substituted on) 56'
PR	17	Joeli Veitayaki Jr.			(substituted on) 75'
PR	18	Lee-roy Atalifo			(substituted on) 64'
LK	19	Api Ratuniyarawa			(substituted on) 54'
FL	20	Naulia Dawai			(substituted on) 60'
N8	21	Eremasi Radrodro
SH	22	Serupepeli Vularika			(substituted on) 78'
WG	23	Waisea Nayacalevu			(substituted on) 73'
Coach:
(New Zealand) John McKee

FB	15	Kotaro Matsushima
RW	14	Akihito Yamada	(substituted off) 51'
OC	13	Timothy Lafaele
IC	12	Harumichi Tatekawa (c)	(substituted off) 51'
LW	11	Kenki Fukuoka
FH	10	Yu Tamura
SH	9	Fumiaki Tanaka	(substituted off) 75'
N8	8	Amanaki Mafi
OF	7	Shunsuke Nunomaki	(substituted off) 40'
BF	6	Malgene Ilaua
RL	5	Samuela Anise
LL	4	Kyosuke Kajikawa	(substituted off) 47'
TP	3	Kensuke Hatakeyama	(substituted off) 40'
HK	2	Shota Horie	(substituted off) 64'
LP	1	Satoshi Nakatani	(substituted off) 47'
Replacements:
PR	16	Kanta Higashionna	(substituted on) 47'
HK	17	Takeshi Hino	(substituted on) 64'
PR	18	Heiichiro Ito	(substituted on) 40'
LK	19	Kotaro Yatabe	(substituted on) 47'
FL	20	Shuhei Matsuhashi	(substituted on) 40'
SH	21	Keisuke Uchida	(substituted on) 75'
FB	22	Amanaki Lotoahea	(substituted on) 51'
CE	23	Karne Hesketh	(substituted on) 51'
Coach:
(New Zealand) Jamie Joseph

Touch judges:
Jaco Peyper (South Africa)
Thomas Charabas (France)
Television match official:
Peter Fitzgibbon (Ireland)

Notes:

- Joeli Veitayaki Jr. (Fiji) made his international debut.

26 November 2016
14:30 GMT (UTC+0)

England	27–14	Argentina
Try: Penalty try 28' c May 67' m Con: Farrell (1/2) 29'; Pen: Farrell (5/8) 3', 12', 23', 51', 63'	Report	Try: Isa 40' c Cordero 40' c Con: Hernández (2/2) 40', 42'

Twickenham Stadium, London
Attendance: 81,586
Referee: Pascal Gaüzère (France)

Team details

FB	15	Mike Brown		(substituted off) 74'
RW	14	Jonny May
OC	13	Jonathan Joseph
IC	12	Owen Farrell
LW	11	Elliot Daly	(red card) 4'
FH	10	George Ford
SH	9	Ben Youngs		(substituted off) 69'
N8	8	Billy Vunipola		(substituted off) 38'
OF	7	Tom Wood		(substituted off) 40+5'	(substituted on) 47'
BF	6	Chris Robshaw
RL	5	George Kruis		(substituted off) 78'
LL	4	Courtney Lawes
TP	3	Dan Cole	(yellow card) 40+4' to 47'			(substituted off) 73'
HK	2	Dylan Hartley (c)		(substituted off) 59'
LP	1	Mako Vunipola		(substituted off) 59'
Replacements:
HK	16	Jamie George		(substituted on) 59'
PR	17	Joe Marler	(yellow card) 75' to 80'	(substituted on) 59'
PR	18	Kyle Sinckler		(substituted on) 40+5'	(substituted off) 47'	(substituted on) 73'
LK	19	Charlie Ewels		(substituted on) 78'
FL	20	Teimana Harrison		(substituted on) 38'
SH	21	Danny Care		(substituted on) 69'
CE	22	Ben Te'o
CE	23	Henry Slade		(substituted on) 74'
Coach:
(Australia) Eddie Jones

FB	15	Santiago Cordero
RW	14	Matías Orlando	(yellow card) 28' to 38'
OC	13	Matías Moroni
IC	12	Santiago González Iglesias			(substituted off) 7'
LW	11	Juan Pablo Estelles		(substituted off) 75'
FH	10	Juan Martín Hernández		(substituted off) 3'	(substituted on) 7'
SH	9	Tomás Cubelli		(substituted off) 67'
N8	8	Leonardo Senatore		(substituted off) 4'
OF	7	Javier Ortega Desio
BF	6	Pablo Matera	(yellow card) 65' to 75'
RL	5	Matías Alemanno		(substituted off) 63'
LL	4	Guido Petti
TP	3	Ramiro Herrera		(substituted off) 61'	(substituted on) 79'
HK	2	Agustín Creevy (c)		(substituted off) 61'
LP	1	Lucas Noguera Paz		(substituted off) 63'
Replacements:
HK	16	Julián Montoya		(substituted on) 61'
PR	17	Santiago García Botta		(substituted on) 63'
PR	18	Enrique Pieretto	(red card) 75'	(substituted on) 61'
N8	19	Facundo Isa		(substituted on) 4'	(substituted off) 79'
FL	20	Tomás Lezana		(substituted on) 63'
SH	21	Martín Landajo		(substituted on) 67'
CE	22	Jerónimo de la Fuente		(substituted on) 3'
CE	23	Gabriel Ascárate		(substituted on) 75'
Coach:
(Argentina) Daniel Hourcade

Man of the Match:
Chris Robshaw (England)

Touch judges:
Marius Mitrea (Italy)
Ian Davies (Wales)
Television match official:
Gareth Simmonds (Wales)

26 November 2016
14:30 GMT (UTC+0)

Scotland	43–16	Georgia
Try: Seymour 7' c Penalty try 14' c Maitland 19' c Hogg (2) 34' c, 76' m Watson 41' c Con: Laidlaw (5/5) 8', 14', 20', 35', 41'; Pen: Laidlaw (1/1) 27'	Report	Try: Lobzhanidze (2) 4' m, 53' m Pen: Kvirikashvili (2/2) 17', 31'

Rugby Park, Kilmarnock
Attendance: 15,401
Referee: Matthew Carley (England)

Team details

FB	15	Stuart Hogg
RW	14	Sean Maitland		(substituted off) 51'
OC	13	Mark Bennett		(substituted off) 62'
IC	12	Alex Dunbar
LW	11	Tommy Seymour
FH	10	Finn Russell
SH	9	Greig Laidlaw (c)		(substituted off) 73'
N8	8	Ryan Wilson
OF	7	Hamish Watson
BF	6	Rob Harley		(substituted off) 47'
RL	5	Jonny Gray
LL	4	Richie Gray		(substituted off) 73'
TP	3	Zander Fagerson		(substituted off) 23'	(substituted on) 40'	(substituted off) 55'
HK	2	Ross Ford		(substituted off) 51'
LP	1	Allan Dell		(substituted off) 55'
Replacements:
HK	16	Fraser Brown		(substituted on) 51'
PR	17	Alex Allan		(substituted on) 55'
PR	18	Moray Low	(yellow card) 73' to 80'	(substituted on) 23'	(substituted off) 40'	(substituted on) 55'
LK	19	Grant Gilchrist		(substituted on) 73'
FL	20	John Barclay		(substituted on) 47'
SH	21	Ali Price		(substituted on) 73'
FH	22	Peter Horne		(substituted on) 62'
WG	23	Rory Hughes		(substituted on) 51'
Coach:
(New Zealand) Vern Cotter

FB	15	Merab Kvirikashvili
RW	14	Giorgi Aptsiauri		(substituted off) 20'
OC	13	Merab Sharikadze
IC	12	Tamaz Mchedlidze
LW	11	Alexander Todua
FH	10	Lasha Malaghuradze
SH	9	Vasil Lobzhanidze
N8	8	Beka Bitsadze				(substituted off) 51'
OF	7	Mamuka Gorgodze (c)
BF	6	Viktor Kolelishvili		(substituted off) 45'
RL	5	Giorgi Nemsadze		(substituted off) 61'
LL	4	Konstantin Mikautadze	(yellow card) 14' to 24'	(substituted off) 41'	(substituted on) 47'
TP	3	Levan Chilachava		(substituted off) 48'
HK	2	Jaba Bregvadze		(substituted off) 48'
LP	1	Mikheil Nariashvili		(substituted off) 48'
Replacements:
HK	16	Badri Alkhazashvili		(substituted on) 48'
PR	17	Karlen Asieshvili		(substituted on) 48'
PR	18	Davit Kubriashvili		(substituted on) 48'
N8	19	Lasha Lomidze		(substituted on) 41'	(substituted off) 47'	(substituted on) 51'
FL	20	Giorgi Tkhilaishvili		(substituted on) 45'
SH	21	Giorgi Begadze
FB	22	Beka Tsiklauri		(substituted on) 20'
FL	23	Shalva Sutiashvili		(substituted on) 61'
Coach:
(New Zealand) Milton Haig

Man of the Match:
Ryan Wilson (Scotland)

Touch judges:
Mathieu Raynal (France)
Dan Jones (Wales)
Television match official:
Simon McDowell (Ireland)

Notes:

- Ali Price (Scotland) made his international debut.

26 November 2016
18:00 EET (UTC+2)

Romania	36–10	Uruguay
Try: Shennan (2) 31' m, 37' c Van Heerden 40' c Surugiu 55' c Fercu 75' c Con: Vlaicu (4/5) 38', 40', 56', 76'; Pen: Vlaicu (1/1) 17'	Report	Try: Lijtenstein 73' c Con: Berchesi (1/1) 74'; Pen: Berchesi (1/1) 35'

Stadionul Arcul de Triumf, Bucharest
Attendance: 5,000
Referee: Ben Whitehouse (Wales)

Team details

FB	15	Cătălin Fercu
RW	14	Tangimana Fonovai	(yellow card) 71' to 80'
OC	13	Jack Umaga		(substituted off) 67'
IC	12	Florin Popa
LW	11	Stephen Shennan		(substituted off) 61'
FH	10	Florin Vlaicu
SH	9	Florin Surugiu		(substituted off) 76'
N8	8	Andrei Gorcioaia
OF	7	Stelian Burcea (c)
BF	6	Viorel Lucaci		(substituted off) 62'
RL	5	Valentin Popârlan		(substituted off) 74'
LL	4	Johan van Heerden
TP	3	Alexandru Țăruș		(substituted off) 48'
HK	2	Andrei Rădoi		(substituted off) 54'
LP	1	Mihai Lazăr		(substituted off) 70'
Replacements:
HK	16	Eugen Căpățână		(substituted on) 54'
PR	17	Ionel Badiu		(substituted on) 70'
PR	18	Alexandru Gordaș		(substituted on) 48'
LK	19	Ionuț Mureșan		(substituted on) 74'
FL	20	Cristi Chirica		(substituted on) 62'
SH	21	Alexandru Tigla		(substituted on) 76'
CE	22	Paula Kinikinilau		(substituted on) 67'
WG	23	Ionuț Dumitru		(substituted on) 61'
Coach:
(Wales) Lynn Howells

FB	15	Manuel Blengio	(yellow card) 44' to 54'
RW	14	Mauro Daverio		(substituted off) 48'
OC	13	Santiago Gibernau		(substituted off) 66'
IC	12	Nicolás Freitas
LW	11	Santiago Arata
FH	10	Felipe Berchesi
SH	9	Agustín Ormaechea		(substituted off) 66'
N8	8	Gonzalo Soto
OF	7	Santiago Hernández		(substituted off) 66'
BF	6	Joaquín Dell’acqua
RL	5	Diego Ayala		(substituted off) 56'
LL	4	Franco Lamanna
TP	3	Mario Sagario (c)		(substituted off) 56'
HK	2	Carlos Arboleya		(substituted off) 66'
LP	1	Ignacio Secco		(substituted off) 56'
Replacements:
HK	16	Facundo Gattas		(substituted on) 56'
PR	17	Francisco Jiménez		(substituted on) 66'
PR	18	Mateo Sanguinetti		(substituted on) 56'
LK	19	Diego Magno		(substituted on) 56'
FL	20	Marcos Chamyan		(substituted on) 66'
SH	21	Guillermo Lijtenstein		(substituted on) 66'
CE	22	Juan Manuel Cat		(substituted on) 48'
WG	23	Andrés Rocco		(substituted on) 66'
Coach:
(Argentina) Esteban Meneses

Touch judges:
Lloyd Linton (Scotland)
Ian Tempest (England)
Television match official:
Neil Paterson (Scotland)

Notes:

- Ionuț Mureșan and Alexandru Tigla (both Romania) and Marcos Chamyan (Uruguay) made their international debuts.

26 November 2016
17:30 WET (UTC+0)

Ireland	27–24	Australia
Try: Henderson 23' c Ringrose 33' c Earls 65' c Con: Jackson (3/3) 24', 34', 67'; Pen: Jackson (2/2) 17', 49'	Report	Try: Haylett-Petty 39' c Kuridrani 45' c Naivalu 56' c Con: Foley (3/3) 40', 47', 57'; Pen: Foley (1/1) 60'

Aviva Stadium, Dublin
Attendance: 51,000
Referee: Jérôme Garcès (France)

Team details

FB	15	Rob Kearney	(substituted off) 11'
RW	14	Andrew Trimble	(substituted off) 30'
OC	13	Jared Payne	(substituted off) 40'
IC	12	Garry Ringrose
LW	11	Keith Earls
FH	10	Paddy Jackson
SH	9	Conor Murray
N8	8	Jamie Heaslip	(substituted off) 60'
OF	7	Josh van der Flier
BF	6	CJ Stander
RL	5	Devin Toner
LL	4	Iain Henderson	(substituted off) 55'
TP	3	Tadhg Furlong	(substituted off) 70'
HK	2	Rory Best (c)	(substituted off) 75'
LP	1	Jack McGrath	(substituted off) 60'
Replacements:
HK	16	Seán Cronin	(substituted on) 75'
PR	17	Cian Healy	(substituted on) 60'
PR	18	Finlay Bealham	(substituted on) 70'
LK	19	Ultan Dillane	(substituted on) 55'
FL	20	Peter O'Mahony	(substituted on) 60'
SH	21	Kieran Marmion	(substituted on) 40'
FH	22	Joey Carbery	(substituted on) 30'
WG	23	Simon Zebo	(substituted on) 11'
Coach:
(New Zealand) Joe Schmidt

FB	15	Israel Folau
RW	14	Dane Haylett-Petty
OC	13	Tevita Kuridrani
IC	12	Reece Hodge		(substituted off) 79'
LW	11	Henry Speight		(substituted off) 55'
FH	10	Bernard Foley	(yellow card) 79' to 80'
SH	9	Will Genia
N8	8	David Pocock
OF	7	Michael Hooper
BF	6	Dean Mumm	(yellow card) 22' to 32'
RL	5	Rob Simmons		(substituted off) 67'
LL	4	Rory Arnold		(substituted off) 40'
TP	3	Sekope Kepu		(substituted off) 67'
HK	2	Stephen Moore (c)		(substituted off) 75'
LP	1	Scott Sio		(substituted off) 67'
Replacements:
HK	16	Tolu Latu		(substituted on) 76'
PR	17	James Slipper		(substituted on) 67'
PR	18	Allan Alaalatoa		(substituted on) 67'
LK	19	Kane Douglas		(substituted on) 40'
FL	20	Sean McMahon		(substituted on) 67'
SH	21	Nick Phipps
FH	22	Quade Cooper		(substituted on) 79'
WG	23	Sefa Naivalu		(substituted on) 55'
Coach:
(Australia) Michael Cheika

Man of the Match:
Josh van der Flier (Ireland)

Touch judges:
JP Doyle (England)
Craig Maxwell-Keys (England)
Television match official:
Eric Gauzins (France)

Notes:

- Rory Best became the fifth Irishman to earn his 100th test cap.
- This was the first time Ireland had achieved back to back wins over Australia since their 1979 Tour of Australia.
- Ireland becomes just the second Northern Hemisphere nation, besides England in both 2002 and 2003, to earn wins over Australia, New Zealand and South Africa all in the same year.
- This was the first time that Ireland has retained the Lansdowne Cup.

26 November 2016
17:30 GMT (UTC+0)

Wales	27–13	South Africa
Try: Owens 45' m Tipuric 75' min c Con: Halfpenny (1/2) 76'; Pen: Halfpenny (5/5) 11', 17', 21', 33', 42'	Report	Try: Cassiem 69' c Con: Lambie (1/1) 70'; Pen: Jantjies (2/2) 6', 23'

Millennium Stadium, Cardiff
Attendance: 55,122
Referee: Romain Poite (France)

Team details

FB	15	Leigh Halfpenny
RW	14	George North
OC	13	Jonathan Davies
IC	12	Scott Williams	(substituted off) 78'
LW	11	Liam Williams	(substituted off) 58'
FH	10	Dan Biggar
SH	9	Gareth Davies
N8	8	Ross Moriarty
OF	7	Justin Tipuric
BF	6	Dan Lydiate	(substituted off) 40'
RL	5	Alun Wyn Jones
LL	4	Luke Charteris	(substituted off) 78'
TP	3	Tomas Francis	(substituted off) 67'
HK	2	Ken Owens	(substituted off) 59'
LP	1	Gethin Jenkins (c)	(substituted off) 66'
Replacements:
HK	16	Scott Baldwin	(substituted on) 59'
PR	17	Nicky Smith	(substituted on) 66'
PR	18	Samson Lee	(substituted on) 67'
LK	19	Cory Hill	(substituted on) 78'
N8	20	Taulupe Faletau	(substituted on) 40'
SH	21	Lloyd Williams
FH	22	Sam Davies	(substituted on) 58'
CE	23	Jamie Roberts	(substituted on) 78'
Coach:
(Wales) Rob Howley

FB	15	Johan Goosen
RW	14	Ruan Combrinck
OC	13	Francois Venter
IC	12	Rohan Janse van Rensburg		(substituted off) 67'
LW	11	Jamba Ulengo
FH	10	Elton Jantjies		(substituted off) 58'
SH	9	Faf de Klerk	(yellow card) 41' to 51'	(substituted off) 64'
N8	8	Warren Whiteley
OF	7	Uzair Cassiem
BF	6	Nizaam Carr		(substituted off) 78'
RL	5	Lood de Jager
LL	4	Pieter-Steph du Toit		(substituted off) 67'
TP	3	Lourens Adriaanse		(substituted off) 67'
HK	2	Adriaan Strauss (c)		(substituted off) 71'
LP	1	Tendai Mtawarira		(substituted off) 58'
Replacements:
HK	16	Malcolm Marx		(substituted on) 71'
PR	17	Steven Kitshoff		(substituted on) 58'
PR	18	Trevor Nyakane		(substituted on) 67'
LK	19	Franco Mostert		(substituted on) 67'
FL	20	Jean-Luc du Preez		(substituted on) 77'
SH	21	Piet van Zyl		(substituted on) 64'
FH	22	Patrick Lambie		(substituted on) 58'
CE	23	Lionel Mapoe		(substituted on) 67'
Coach:
(South Africa) Allister Coetzee

Man of the Match:
Justin Tipuric (Wales)

Touch judges:
Greg Garner (England)
Tom Foley (England)
Television match official:
Graham Hughes (England)

Notes:

- This was Wales' largest winning margin over South Africa, surpassing the 10 point margin set in 1999.
- Uzair Cassiem, Jean-Luc du Preez and Rohan Janse van Rensburg (all South Africa) made their international debuts.
- This was the first ever time that Wales had retained the Prince William Cup.

26 November 2016
21:00 CET (UTC+1)

France	19–24	New Zealand
Try: Picamoles 61' c Con: Serin (1/1) 62'; Pen: Machenaud (2/2) 24', 39'; Serin (2/2) 49', 76'	Report	Try: Dagg 6' c B. Barrett 42' c Faumuina 57' c Con: B. Barrett (3/3) 7', 42', 58'; Pen: B. Barrett (1/1) 16'

Stade de France, Saint-Denis
Attendance: 80,000
Referee: Wayne Barnes (England)

Team details

FB	15	Brice Dulin
RW	14	Noa Nakaitaci
OC	13	Rémi Lamerat			(substituted off) 60'
IC	12	Wesley Fofana	11' to 16'
LW	11	Virimi Vakatawa
FH	10	Camille Lopez
SH	9	Maxime Machenaud	(substituted off) 47'
N8	8	Louis Picamoles	(substituted off) 66'
OF	7	Kevin Gourdon
BF	6	Charles Ollivon
RL	5	Yoann Maestri	(substituted off) 14'
LL	4	Sébastien Vahaamahina
TP	3	Uini Atonio	(substituted off) 60'
HK	2	Guilhem Guirado (c)	(substituted off) 69'
LP	1	Xavier Chiocci	(substituted off) 60'
Replacements:
HK	16	Camille Chat	(substituted on) 69'
PR	17	Cyril Baille	(substituted on) 60'
PR	18	Rabah Slimani	(substituted on) 60'
LK	19	Julien Le Devedec	(substituted on) 14'
N8	20	Damien Chouly	(substituted on) 66'
SH	21	Baptiste Serin	(substituted on) 47'
FH	22	Jean-Marc Doussain
CE	23	Gaël Fickou	(substituted on) 11'	(substituted off) 16'	(substituted on) 60'
Coach:
(France) Guy Novès

FB	15	Israel Dagg	(substituted off) 56'
RW	14	Waisake Naholo
OC	13	Anton Lienert-Brown
IC	12	Ryan Crotty	(substituted off) 43'
LW	11	Julian Savea
FH	10	Beauden Barrett
SH	9	TJ Perenara	(substituted off) 58'
N8	8	Kieran Read (c)
OF	7	Matt Todd	(substituted off) 56'
BF	6	Jerome Kaino
RL	5	Sam Whitelock
LL	4	Brodie Retallick	(substituted off) 43'
TP	3	Owen Franks	(substituted off) 47'
HK	2	Dane Coles	(substituted off) 62'
LP	1	Joe Moody	(substituted off) 43'
Replacements:
HK	16	Codie Taylor	(substituted on) 62'
PR	17	Wyatt Crockett	(substituted on) 43'
PR	18	Charlie Faumuina	(substituted on) 47'
LK	19	Scott Barrett	(substituted on) 43'
FL	20	Ardie Savea	(substituted on) 56'
SH	21	Aaron Smith	(substituted on) 58'
FH	22	Aaron Cruden	(substituted on) 56'
WG	23	Rieko Ioane	(substituted on) 43'
Coach:
(New Zealand) Steve Hansen

Touch judges:
Federico Anselmi (Argentina)
Dudley Phillips (Ireland)
Television match official:
Rowan Kitt (England)

Notes:

- This was New Zealand's 10th consecutive victory over France, their longest ever winning streak over the French.
- New Zealand retained the Dave Gallaher Trophy for the fourth consecutive time.

1 December 2016
15:00 WET (UTC+0)

Portugal	21–17	Brazil
Try: Appleton 21' m Costa 41' c Con: Lima (1/2) 42'; Pen: Lima (3/4) 32', 35', 63'		Try: F. Sancery 18' c Duque 71' c Con: Duque (2/2) 19', 72'; Pen: Duque (1/1) 3'

Estádio Municipal Sérgio Conceição, Coimbra
Attendance: 2,000
Referee: Vlad Iordachescu (Romania)

Team details

FB	15	José Lima
RW	14	Pedro Silvério
OC	13	Tomás Appleton
IC	12	Vasco Ribeiro		(substituted off) 59'
LW	11	Duarte Moreira (rugby union)Duarte Moreira
FH	10	Nuno Penha Costa
SH	9	Francisco Pinto Magalhães (c)		(substituted off) 66'
N8	8	Pedro Rosa	(yellow card) 69' to 79'
OF	7	Sebastião Villax		(substituted off) 46'
BF	6	Maxime Vaz		(substituted off) 72'
RL	5	Gonçalo Uva	(yellow card) 74' to 80'
LL	4	João Lino
TP	3	Francisco Bruno		(substituted off) 50'
HK	2	Duarte Diniz		(substituted off) 59'
LP	1	Bruno Medeiros		(substituted off) 50'
Replacements:
PR	16	João Côrte-Real		(substituted on) 50'
HK	17	Duarte Foro	(yellow card) 79' to 80'	(substituted on) 59'
PR	18	José Conde		(substituted on) 50'
LK	19	José Fino		(substituted on) 72'
FL	20	Miguel Macedo		(substituted on) 46'
SH	21	João Belo		(substituted on) 66'
CE	22	Manuel Vilela		(substituted on) 59'
FH	23	Duarte Marques
Coach:
(Portugal) Martim Aguiar

FB	15	Daniel Sancery
RW	14	Robert Tenorio (rugby)
OC	13	Felipe Sancery
IC	12	Luan Soares		(substituted off) 72'
LW	11	Stefano Giantorno		(substituted off) 44'
FH	10	Moisés Duque
SH	9	Beukes Cremer		(substituted off) 74'
N8	8	Nick Smith (c)
OF	7	João Luiz da Ros		(substituted off) 47'
BF	6	Matheus Daniel	(yellow card) 62' to 72'	(substituted off) 74'
RL	5	Gabriel Paganini
LL	4	Lucas Piero	(yellow card) 74' to 80'
TP	3	Flávio Chuahy		(substituted off) 40'
HK	2	Yan Rosetti	(yellow card) 79' to 80'
LP	1	Alexandre Figueiredo		(substituted off) 58'
Replacements:
HK	16	Daniel Danielewicz
PR	17	Jonatas Paulo		(substituted on) 58'
PR	18	Caíque Silva		(substituted on) 40'
FL	19	Cleber Dias		(substituted on) 47'
FL	20	Joabe de Souza		(substituted on) 74'
SH	21	Bruno Garcia		(substituted on) 74'
CE	22	Mateus Estrela		(substituted on) 72'
FB	23	Guilherme Coghetto		(substituted on) 44'
Coach:
(Argentina) Rodolfo Ambrosio

Touch judges:
Portugal Appt. (Portugal)
Portugal Appt. (Portugal)

3 December 2016
14:30 GMT (UTC+0)

England	37–21	Australia
Try: Joseph (2) 29' c, 73' c Yarde 44' c Youngs 49' c Con: Farrell (3/3) 29', 45', 51'; Ford (1/1) 75'; Pen: Farrell (3/3) 18', 27', 57'	Report	Try: Naivalu 6' c Kepu 65' m Con: Foley (1/2) 9'; Pen: Foley (3/4) 14', 34', 40'

Twickenham Stadium, London
Attendance: 81,787
Referee: Jaco Peyper (South Africa)

Team details

FB	15	Mike Brown
RW	14	Marland Yarde
OC	13	Jonathan Joseph
IC	12	Owen Farrell	(substituted off) 66'
LW	11	Jonny May
FH	10	George Ford
SH	9	Ben Youngs	(substituted off) 62'
N8	8	Nathan Hughes
OF	7	Tom Wood
BF	6	Chris Robshaw	(substituted off) 68'
RL	5	George Kruis	(substituted off) 72'
LL	4	Courtney Lawes
TP	3	Dan Cole	(substituted off) 66'
HK	2	Dylan Hartley (c)	(substituted off) 58'
LP	1	Mako Vunipola	(substituted off) 58'
Replacements:
HK	16	Jamie George	(substituted on) 58'
PR	17	Joe Marler	(substituted on) 58'
PR	18	Kyle Sinckler	(substituted on) 66'
LK	19	Charlie Ewels	(substituted on) 72'
FL	20	Teimana Harrison	(substituted on) 68'
SH	21	Danny Care	(substituted on) 62'
CE	22	Ben Te'o	(substituted on) 66'
CE	23	Henry Slade
Coach:
(Australia) Eddie Jones

FB	15	Israel Folau
RW	14	Dane Haylett-Petty	(yellow card) 71' to 80'
OC	13	Tevita Kuridrani
IC	12	Reece Hodge		(substituted off) 68'
LW	11	Sefa Naivalu		(substituted off) 68'
FH	10	Bernard Foley
SH	9	Nick Phipps		(substituted off) 68'
N8	8	Lopeti Timani		(substituted off) 66'
OF	7	Michael Hooper
BF	6	David Pocock
RL	5	Rob Simmons
LL	4	Kane Douglas		(substituted off) 60'
TP	3	Sekope Kepu		(substituted off) 72'
HK	2	Stephen Moore (c)		(substituted off) 72'
LP	1	Scott Sio		(substituted off) 57'
Replacements:
HK	16	Tolu Latu		(substituted on) 72'
PR	17	James Slipper		(substituted on) 72'
PR	18	Tom Robertson		(substituted on) 57'
FL	19	Dean Mumm		(substituted on) 60'
FL	20	Sean McMahon		(substituted on) 66'
SH	21	Nick Frisby		(substituted on) 68'
FH	22	Quade Cooper		(substituted on) 68'
WG	23	Henry Speight		(substituted on) 68'
Coach:
(Australia) Michael Cheika

Man of the Match:
Ben Youngs (England)

Touch judges:
Craig Joubert (South Africa)
Ben Whitehouse (Wales)
Television match official:
Peter Fitzgibbon (Ireland)

Notes:

- England retained the Cook Cup.
- England became only the 2nd team in the professional era to win all their matches in a calendar year, after New Zealand in 2013. Note New Zealand (1997) and Ireland (2009) both went the year unbeaten, but drew tests with England and Australia respectively.

== See also ==
- 2016 World Rugby Americas Pacific Challenge
- 2016 Cup of Nations
- 2019 Rugby World Cup
- 2016 mid-year rugby union internationals
- End of year rugby union tests
- Mid-year rugby union tests
