= 2015 World Rugby Nations Cup =

Tournament details
- Countries: Argentina XV; Namibia; Romania; Spain
- Tournament format(s): Round-robin
- Date: 12 – 21 June 2014

Tournament statistics
- Teams: 4
- Matches played: 6
- Tries scored: 21 (3.5 per match)
- Top point scorer(s): (Romania) Florin Vlaicu
- Top try scorer(s): (Romania) Viorel Lucaci (2) (Romania) Florin Surugiu (2)

Final
- Champions: Romania (3rd title)
- Runners-up: Argentina XV

The 2015 World Rugby Nations Cup was the tenth edition of the international rugby union tournament, a competition created by the World Rugby. For the ninth time in a row, it was held at the Stadionul Naţional de Rugby in Bucharest, Romania, and was played between 12 and 21 June, running alongside 2015 World Rugby Tbilisi Cup in Georgia.

Romania, the hosts, were joined by ENC side Spain and Argentina A side, Argentina Jaguars, while Namibia returned for the first time since 2011, as they and Romania prepare to participate in the 2015 Rugby World Cup.

Hosts Romania won the tournament, for the first time since 2013, with three from three victories.

== Standings ==
	Team	Games				Points			Tries		Bounus points	Points
	Team	Played	Won	Drawn	Lost	For	Against	Difference	For	Against	Bounus points	Points
1	Romania	3	3	0	0	101	12	+89	9	0	1	13
2	Argentina XV	3	2	0	1	45	39	+6	6	2	1	9
3	Spain	3	1	0	2	35	53	–18	3	4	0	4
4	Namibia	3	0	0	3	16	93	–77	1	14	0	0
Source : worldrugby.org Points breakdown: *4 points for a win *2 points for a draw *1 bonus point for a loss by seven points or less *1 bonus point for scoring four or more tries in a match

== Fixtures ==
The fixtures were announced on 1 May 2015.

=== Matchday 1 ===
12 June 2015
17:00 EET (UTC+2)

Namibia	10–30	Argentina XV
Try: Kotzé 24' c Con: Kotzé (1/1) 25'; Drop: Kotzé (1/1) 33'	Stats	Try: Panceyra Garrido 8' c Bosch 39' c Cappiello 51' m Paz m Con: Novillo (2/3) 9', 40'; Pen: Novillo (2/4) 29', 54'

Referee: Alexandre Ruiz (France)

FB	15	Johann Tromp
RW	14	Russell van Wyk
OC	13	Danie van Wyk
IC	12	JC Greyling	(substituted off) 75'
LW	11	David Philander
FH	10	Theuns Kotzé	(substituted off) 75'
SH	9	Eugene Jantjies	(substituted off) 64'
N8	8	PJ van Lill (c)
OF	7	Janco Venter	(substituted off) 61'
BF	6	Tinus du Plessis
RL	5	Nico Esterhuyse
LL	4	Tijuee Uanivi
TP	3	Aranos Coetzee	(substituted off) 27'
HK	2	DG Wiese	(substituted off) 67'
LP	1	Casper Viviers	(substituted off) 67'
Replacements:
HK	16	Rathony Becker	(substituted on) 67'
PR	17	Johnny Redelinghuys	(substituted on) 27'
PR	18	AJ de Klerk	(substituted on) 67'
FL	19	Leneve Damens	(substituted on) 61'
FL	20	Thomasau Forbes
SH	21	Eniell Buitendag	(substituted on) 64'
FH	22	Shaun Kaizemi	(substituted on) 75'
CE	23	Heinrich Smit	(substituted on) 75'
Coach:
(Namibia) Danie Vermeulen

FB	15	Tomás Carrió
RW	14	Franco Cuaranta
OC	13	Juan Cappiello	(substituted off) 75'
IC	12	Joaquín Paz
LW	11	Augusto López
FH	10	Juan León Novillo	(substituted off) 58'
SH	9	Gonzalo Bertranou (c)	(substituted off) 58'
N8	8	Aníbal Panceyra Garrido	(substituted off) 61'
OF	7	Gonzalo Paulín	(substituted off) 71'
BF	6	Lucas Maguire
RL	5	Gerónimo Albertario
LL	4	Franco Baldoni
TP	3	Guido Randisi	(substituted off) 58'
HK	2	Facundo Bosch	(substituted off) 62'
LP	1	Roberto Tejerizo	(substituted off) 56'
Replacements:
PR	16	Santiago García Botta	(substituted on) 56'
HK	17	Tomás Baravalle	(substituted on) 62'
PR	18	Nicolás Mirande	(substituted on) 58'
LK	19	Manuel Plaza	(substituted on) 71'
N8	20	Miguel Urtubey	(substituted on) 61'
SH	21	Lucas Alcácer	(substituted on) 58'
FH	22	Cristian Nacassian	(substituted on) 58'
CE	23	Ignacio Brex	(substituted on) 75'
Coach:
(Argentina) Felipe Contepomi (Argentina) Ricardo Le Fort

12 June 2015
20:00 EET (UTC+2)

Romania	35–9	Spain
Try: Lucaci (2) 35' c, 68' c Con: Vlaicu (1/1) 35'; Dumbravă (1/1) 69'; Pen: Vlaicu (6/7) 8', 14', 29', 47', 49', 53'; Fercu (1/1) 78'	Stats	Pen: Linklater (1/3) 16'; Aubanell (2/2) 44', 59'

Referee: Luke Pearce (England)

FB	15	Cătălin Fercu
RW	14	Adrian Apostol	(yellow card) 19' to 29'
OC	13	Csaba Gál
IC	12	Florin Vlaicu		(substituted off) 60'
LW	11	Ionuț Botezatu
FH	10	Dănuț Dumbravă		(substituted off) 69'
SH	9	Valentin Calafeteanu		(substituted off) 54'
N8	8	Stelian Burcea		(substituted off) 69'
OF	7	Mihai Macovei (c)
BF	6	Viorel Lucaci
RL	5	Marian Drenceanu
LL	4	Valentin Popârlan		(substituted off) 55'
TP	3	Andrei Ursache		(substituted off) 68'
HK	2	Otar Turashvili		(substituted off) 67'
LP	1	Mihai Lazăr		(substituted off) 67'
Replacements:
HK	16	Andrei Rădoi		(substituted on) 67'
PR	17	Constantin Pristăviță		(substituted on) 67'
PR	18	Vlad Bădălicescu		(substituted on) 69'
LK	19	Marius Antonescu		(substituted on) 55'
N8	20	Vlad Nistor		(substituted on) 69'
SH	21	Florin Surugiu		(substituted on) 54'
FH	22	Jody Rose		(substituted on) 69'
WG	23	Florin Ioniță		(substituted on) 60'
Coach:
(Wales) Lynn Howells

FB	15	Sergi Aubanell
RW	14	Ignacio Contardi
OC	13	Federico Castiglione
IC	12	Thibaut Alvarez
LW	11	Pierre García		(substituted off) 60'
FH	10	Brad Linklater
SH	9	Gregory Maiquez		(substituted off) 74'
N8	8	Jaime Nava de Olano (c)
OF	7	Adam Newton
BF	6	Javier de Juan
RL	5	Aníbal Bonán	(yellow card) 52' to 62'
LL	4	David Barrera Howarth
TP	3	Francisco Sanz Benlloch		(substituted off) 67'
HK	2	Joe Hutchinson
LP	1	Fernando Martin Lopez Perez		(substituted off) 57'
Replacements:
PR	16	Francisco Blanco	(yellow card) 71' to 80'	(substituted on) 57'
HK	17	Juan Anaya Lazaro
PR	18	Ángel Durango		(substituted on) 67'
FL	19	Manuel Mora Ruiz
FL	20	Jose Luis del Valle
SH	21	Facundo Munilla		(substituted on) 74'
FH	22	Marcos Puig
CE	23	Gauthier Minguillón		(substituted on) 60'
Coach:
(Spain) Santiago Santos

=== Matchday 2 ===
17 June 2015
17:00 EET (UTC+2)

Argentina XV	15–6	Spain
Try: Carrió 41' m Cuaranta 47' c Con: Nacassian (1/2) 48'; Pen: Nacassian (1/2) 7'	Stats	Pen: Aubanell (1/2) 56'; Linklater (1/1) 68'

Referee: Alexandre Ruiz (France)

FB	15	Tomás Carrió
RW	14	Franco Cuaranta
OC	13	Ignacio Brex		5' to 18'
IC	12	Brian Ormson
LW	11	Bautista Álvarez
FH	10	Cristian Nacassian
SH	9	Lucas Alcácer (c)
N8	8	Aníbal Panceyra Garrido
OF	7	Miguel Urtubey
BF	6	Lucas Maguire	(yellow card) 32' to 42'	(substituted off) 49'
RL	5	Gerónimo Albertario
LL	4	Manuel Plaza
TP	3	Lucas Martínez		(substituted off) 60'
HK	2	Tomás Baravalle
LP	1	Santiago García Botta		(substituted off) 62'
Replacements:
PR	16	Roberto Tejerizo
HK	17	Facundo Bosch		(substituted on) 62'
PR	18	Nicolás Mirande		(substituted on) 60'
LK	19	Franco Baldoni
FL	20	Martín Chiappesoni		(substituted on) 49'
SH	21	Gonzalo Bertranou
CE	22	Juan Cappiello		(substituted on) 5'	(substituted off) 18'
WG	23	Augusto López
Coach:
(Argentina) Felipe Contepomi (Argentina) Ricardo Le Fort

FB	15	Sergi Aubanell		(substituted off) 62'
RW	14	Antoine Sánchez
OC	13	Brad Linklater
IC	12	Thibaut Alvarez		(substituted off) 60'
LW	11	Ignacio Contardi
FH	10	Marcos Puig
SH	9	Gregory Maiquez
N8	8	Jaime Nava de Olano (c)		(substituted off) 50'
OF	7	Jose Luis del Valle
BF	6	David Barrera Howarth
RL	5	Aníbal Bonán	(yellow card) 38' to 48'		(substituted off) 54'
LL	4	Tomás Urbaitis
TP	3	Fernando Martin Lopez Perez		(substituted off) 48'
HK	2	Juan Anaya Lazaro		(substituted off) 46'
LP	1	Francisco Sanz Benlloch		(substituted off) 43'
Replacements:
PR	16	Francisco Blanco		(substituted on) 48'
HK	17	Johnathan Phipps		(substituted on) 46'
PR	18	Joe Hutchinson		(substituted on) 43'
FL	19	Manuel Mora Ruiz		(substituted on) 54'
FL	20	Javier de Juan		(substituted on) 50'
SH	21	Facundo Munilla
FH	22	Pierre García		(substituted on) 62'
CE	23	Gauthier Minguillón		(substituted on) 60'
Coach:
(Spain) Santiago Santos

17 June 2015
20:00 EET (UTC+2)

Romania	43–3	Namibia
Try: Macovei (2) 10' m, 51' c Surugiu 23' m Ioniță 34' c Botezatu 41' m Morrison 70' c Vlaicu 73' c Con: Dumbravă (2/5) 34', 52'; Vlaicu (2/2) 71', 74'	Stats	Pen: Kaizemi (1/1) 3'

Referee: Federico Anselmi (Argentina)

FB	15	Cătălin Fercu	(substituted off) 52'
RW	14	Florin Ioniță
OC	13	Catalin Dascălu
IC	12	Csaba Gál	(substituted off) 64'
LW	11	Ionuț Botezatu
FH	10	Dănuț Dumbravă
SH	9	Florin Surugiu	(substituted off) 67'
N8	8	Mihai Macovei (c)
OF	7	Randall Morrison
BF	6	Viorel Lucaci	(substituted off) 66'
RL	5	Marian Drenceanu	(substituted off) 62'
LL	4	Marius Antonescu
TP	3	Andrei Ursache	(substituted off) 46'
HK	2	Andrei Rădoi
LP	1	Mihai Lazăr	(substituted off) 54'
Replacements:
HK	16	Otar Turashvili
PR	17	Constantin Pristăviță	(substituted on) 54'
PR	18	Vlad Bădălicescu	(substituted on) 46'
LK	19	Dorin Lazăr	(substituted on) 62'
N8	20	Vlad Nistor	(substituted on) 67'
SH	21	Valentin Calafeteanu	(substituted on) 67'
CE	22	Florin Vlaicu	(substituted on) 64'
WG	23	Stephen Hihetah	(substituted on) 52'
Coach:
(Wales) Lynn Howells

FB	15	Johann Tromp
RW	14	David Philander
OC	13	Danie van Wyk
IC	12	JC Greyling
LW	11	Conrad Marais
FH	10	Shaun Kaizemi	(substituted off) 40'
SH	9	Eugene Jantjies
N8	8	PJ van Lill (c)
OF	7	Leneve Damens
BF	6	Thomasau Forbes
RL	5	Nico Esterhuyse
LL	4	Janco Venter	(substituted off) 68'
TP	3	Casper Viviers
HK	2	Callie Swanepoel	(substituted off) 52'
LP	1	Johnny Redelinghuys	(substituted off) 52'
Replacements:
HK	16	DG Wiese	(substituted on) 52'
PR	17	Jaco Engels
PR	18	AJ de Klerk	(substituted on) 52'
LK	19	Tjiuee Uanivi	(substituted on) 68'
FL	20	Roderique Victor
SH	21	Eniell Buitendag
FH	22	Theuns Kotzé
CE	23	Heinrich Smit	(substituted on) 40'
Coach:
(Namibia) Danie Vermeulen

=== Matchday 3 ===
21 June 2015
17:00 EET (UTC+2)

Spain	20–3	Namibia
Try: Contardi 12' m Bonán 27' c Garcia 31' m Con: Aubanell (1/3) 28'; Pen: Aubanell (1/2) 79'	Stats	Con: Kotzé (1/2) 16'

Referee: Federico Anselmi (Argentina)

FB	15	Sergi Aubanell
RW	14	Ignacio Contardi	(substituted off) 75'
OC	13	Federico Castiglione
IC	12	Thibaut Alvarez
LW	11	Pierre García	(substituted off) 47'
FH	10	Brad Linklater
SH	9	Facundo Munilla
N8	8	Jaime Nava de Olano (c)			(substituted off) 69'
OF	7	Adam Newton	(substituted off) 58'
BF	6	Javier de Juan	33' to 40'
RL	5	Aníbal Bonán	(substituted off) 69'
LL	4	David Barrera Howarth
TP	3	Fernando Martin Lopez Perez	(substituted off) 47'
HK	2	Juan Anaya Lazaro	(substituted off) 47'
LP	1	Francisco Sanz Benlloch	(substituted off) 40'
Replacements:
PR	16	Francisco Blanco	(substituted on) 47'
HK	17	Johnathan Phipps	(substituted on) 47'
PR	18	Joe Hutchinson	(substituted on) 40'
LK	19	Tomás Urbaitis	(substituted on) 69'
FL	20	Francisco Copplet	(substituted on) 33'	(substituted off) 40'	(substituted on) 69'
FL	21	Jose Luis del Valle	(substituted on) 58'
WG	22	Antoine Sánchez	(substituted on) 75'
CE	23	Gauthier Minguillón	(substituted on) 47'
Coach:
(Spain) Santiago Santos

FB	15	Johann Tromp
RW	14	David Philander
OC	13	Danie van Wyk
IC	12	JC Greyling
LW	11	Russell van Wyk	(substituted off) 63'
FH	10	Theuns Kotzé
SH	9	Eniell Buitendag	(substituted off) 55'
N8	8	PJ van Lill (c)
OF	7	Tinus du Plessis
BF	6	Thomasau Forbes
RL	5	Tijuee Uanivi
LL	4	Janco Venter
TP	3	Aranos Coetzee	(substituted off) 65'
HK	2	DG Wiese	(substituted off) 65'
LP	1	Casper Viviers	71' to 73'
Replacements:
HK	16	Callie Swanepoel	(substituted on) 65'
PR	17	Johnny Redelinghuys	(substituted on) 65'
PR	18	AJ de Klerk	(substituted on) 71'	(substituted off) 73'
LK	19	Nico Esterhuyse
FL	20	Leneve Damens
SH	21	Eugene Jantjies	(substituted on) 55'
CE	22	Heinrich Smit	(substituted on) 63'
WG	23	Conrad Marais
Coach:
(Namibia) Danie Vermeulen

21 June 2015
20:00 EET (UTC+2)

Romania	23–0	Argentina XV
Try: Lazăr 24' c Surugiu 59' c Con: Vlaicu (2/2) 25', 59'; Pen: Vlaicu (3/5) 46', 49', 52'	Stats

Referee: Luke Pearce (England)

FB	15	Cătălin Fercu
RW	14	Adrian Apostol
OC	13	Csaba Gál
IC	12	Florin Vlaicu
LW	11	Ionuț Botezatu
FH	10	Michael Wiringi
SH	9	Valentin Calafeteanu	(substituted off) 57'
N8	8	Mihai Macovei (c)
OF	7	Vlad Nistor
BF	6	Viorel Lucaci
RL	5	Marian Drenceanu
LL	4	Marius Antonescu
TP	3	Vlad Bădălicescu	(substituted off) 60'
HK	2	Otar Turashvili
LP	1	Mihai Lazăr	(substituted off) 75'
Replacements:
HK	16	Andrei Rădoi	(substituted on) 75'
PR	17	Constantin Pristăviță	(substituted on) 60'
PR	18	Alex Gordaș
LK	19	Dorin Lazăr
FL	20	Stelian Burcea
SH	21	Florin Surugiu	(substituted on) 57'
FH	22	Dănuț Dumbravă
WG	23	Florin Ioniță
Coach:
(Wales) Lynn Howells

FB	15	Tomás Carrió
RW	14	Augusto López
OC	13	Juan Cappiello
IC	12	Joaquín Paz
LW	11	Franco Cuaranta
FH	10	Juan León Novillo
SH	9	Gonzalo Bertranou (c)
N8	8	Martín Chiappesoni
OF	7	Gonzalo Paulín
BF	6	Lucas Maguire (yellow card) 23' to 33'
RL	5	Aníbal Panceyra Garrido
LL	4	Gerónimo Albertario
TP	3	Guido Randisi
HK	2	Facundo Bosch
LP	1	Roberto Tejerizo
Replacements:
PR	16	Santiago García Botta
HK	17	Tomás Baravalle
PR	18	Nicolás Mirande
LK	19	Franco Baldoni
N8	20	Miguel Urtubey
SH	21	Lucas Alcácer
CE	22	Brian Ormson
WG	23	Bautista Álvarez
Coach:
(Argentina) Felipe Contepomi (Argentina) Ricardo Le Fort

== See also ==
- 2015 World Rugby Pacific Nations Cup
- 2015 World Rugby Tbilisi Cup
