= 2015 Rugby World Cup squads =

The 2015 Rugby World Cup was an international rugby union tournament held in England and Wales from 18 September until 31 October 2015. 20 national teams competed, each bringing a squad of 31 players to the tournament. Each team had to submit their squad to World Rugby by 31 August 2015. A player could be replaced for medical or compassionate reasons, but would be unable to return to the squad. Any replacement players had an enforced stand-down period of 48 hours before they could take the field.

Players marked (c) were the nominated captains for their teams. All details, such as number of international caps and player age, are as of the opening day of the tournament on 18 September 2015.

== Pool A ==
=== Australia ===
On 21 August, Australia announced their 31-man squad.

^{1} On 29 September, Sam Carter and James Hanson were called up to the squad to replace Will Skelton and Wycliff Palu, injured during Australia's game with Uruguay.

Head coach: (Australia) Michael Cheika

Player	Position	Date of birth (age)	Caps	Club/province
James Hanson ^{1}	Hooker	15 September 1988 (aged 27)	10	(Australia) Queensland Reds
Stephen Moore (c)	Hooker	20 January 1983 (aged 32)	96	(Australia) Brumbies
Tatafu Polota-Nau	Hooker	26 July 1985 (aged 30)	54	(Australia) Waratahs
Greg Holmes	Prop	11 June 1983 (aged 32)	18	(Australia) Queensland Reds
Sekope Kepu	Prop	5 February 1986 (aged 29)	56	(Australia) Waratahs
Scott Sio	Prop	16 October 1991 (aged 23)	10	(Australia) Brumbies
James Slipper	Prop	6 June 1989 (aged 26)	68	(Australia) Queensland Reds
Toby Smith	Prop	10 October 1988 (aged 26)	1	(Australia) Melbourne Rebels
Sam Carter ^{1}	Lock	10 October 1989 (aged 25)	12	(Australia) Brumbies
Kane Douglas	Lock	1 June 1989 (aged 26)	16	(Australia) Queensland Reds
Dean Mumm	Lock	5 March 1984 (aged 31)	37	(Australia) Waratahs
Rob Simmons	Lock	19 April 1989 (aged 26)	53	(Australia) Queensland Reds
Will Skelton ^{1}	Lock	3 May 1992 (aged 23)	12	(Australia) Waratahs
Scott Fardy	Flanker	5 July 1984 (aged 31)	24	(Australia) Brumbies
Michael Hooper	Flanker	29 October 1991 (aged 23)	46	(Australia) Waratahs
Sean McMahon	Flanker	18 June 1994 (aged 21)	4	(Australia) Melbourne Rebels
David Pocock	Flanker	23 April 1988 (aged 27)	50	(Australia) Brumbies
Ben McCalman	Number 8	18 March 1988 (aged 27)	41	(Australia) Western Force
Wycliff Palu ^{1}	Number 8	27 July 1982 (aged 33)	56	(Australia) Waratahs
Will Genia	Scrum-half	17 January 1988 (aged 27)	60	(Australia) Queensland Reds
Nick Phipps	Scrum-half	9 January 1989 (aged 26)	32	(Australia) Waratahs
Quade Cooper	Fly-half	5 April 1988 (aged 27)	57	(Australia) Queensland Reds
Bernard Foley	Fly-half	8 September 1989 (aged 26)	21	(Australia) Waratahs
Kurtley Beale	Centre	6 January 1989 (aged 26)	53	(Australia) Waratahs
Matt Giteau	Centre	29 September 1982 (aged 32)	96	(France) Toulon
Tevita Kuridrani	Centre	31 March 1991 (aged 24)	24	(Australia) Brumbies
Matt To'omua	Centre	2 January 1990 (aged 25)	25	(Australia) Brumbies
Adam Ashley-Cooper	Wing	27 March 1984 (aged 31)	108	(Australia) Waratahs
Rob Horne	Wing	15 August 1989 (aged 26)	27	(Australia) Waratahs
Drew Mitchell	Wing	26 March 1984 (aged 31)	65	(France) Toulon
Henry Speight	Wing	25 March 1988 (aged 27)	4	(Australia) Brumbies
Joe Tomane	Wing	11 February 1990 (aged 25)	16	(Australia) Brumbies
Israel Folau	Fullback	3 April 1989 (aged 26)	33	(Australia) Waratahs

=== England ===
On 27 August, England announced their 31-man squad.

^{1} On 28 September, Nick Easter was called up to the squad to replace Billy Vunipola, injured during England's game with Wales.

Head coach: (England) Stuart Lancaster

Player	Position	Date of birth (age)	Caps	Club/province
Jamie George	Hooker	22 October 1990 (aged 24)	2	(England) Saracens
Rob Webber	Hooker	1 August 1986 (aged 29)	13	(England) Bath
Tom Youngs	Hooker	28 January 1987 (aged 28)	24	(England) Leicester Tigers
Kieran Brookes	Prop	29 August 1990 (aged 25)	12	(England) Northampton Saints
Dan Cole	Prop	9 May 1987 (aged 28)	52	(England) Leicester Tigers
Joe Marler	Prop	7 July 1990 (aged 25)	33	(England) Harlequins
Mako Vunipola	Prop	13 January 1991 (aged 24)	23	(England) Saracens
David Wilson	Prop	9 April 1985 (aged 30)	43	(England) Bath
George Kruis	Lock	22 February 1990 (aged 25)	8	(England) Saracens
Joe Launchbury	Lock	12 April 1991 (aged 24)	24	(England) Wasps
Courtney Lawes	Lock	23 February 1989 (aged 26)	40	(England) Northampton Saints
Geoff Parling	Lock	28 October 1983 (aged 31)	25	(England) Exeter Chiefs
James Haskell	Flanker	2 April 1985 (aged 30)	60	(England) Wasps
Chris Robshaw (c)	Flanker	4 June 1986 (aged 29)	39	(England) Harlequins
Tom Wood	Flanker	3 November 1986 (aged 28)	38	(England) Northampton Saints
Nick Easter ^{1}	Number 8	15 August 1978 (aged 37)	52	(England) Harlequins
Ben Morgan	Number 8	18 February 1989 (aged 26)	29	(England) Gloucester
Billy Vunipola ^{1}	Number 8	3 November 1992 (aged 22)	19	(England) Saracens
Danny Care	Scrum-half	2 January 1987 (aged 28)	52	(England) Harlequins
Richard Wigglesworth	Scrum-half	9 June 1983 (aged 32)	23	(England) Saracens
Ben Youngs	Scrum-half	5 September 1989 (aged 26)	49	(England) Leicester Tigers
Owen Farrell	Fly-half	24 September 1991 (aged 23)	31	(England) Saracens
George Ford	Fly-half	16 March 1993 (aged 22)	13	(England) Bath
Brad Barritt	Centre	7 August 1986 (aged 29)	23	(England) Saracens
Sam Burgess	Centre	14 December 1988 (aged 26)	2	(England) Bath
Jonathan Joseph	Centre	21 May 1991 (aged 24)	13	(England) Bath
Henry Slade	Centre	19 March 1993 (aged 22)	1	(England) Exeter Chiefs
Jonny May	Wing	1 April 1990 (aged 25)	16	(England) Gloucester
Jack Nowell	Wing	11 April 1993 (aged 22)	9	(England) Exeter Chiefs
Anthony Watson	Wing	26 February 1994 (aged 21)	11	(England) Bath
Mike Brown	Fullback	4 September 1985 (aged 30)	39	(England) Harlequins
Alex Goode	Fullback	7 May 1988 (aged 27)	18	(England) Saracens

=== Fiji ===
On 21 August, Fiji announced their 31-man squad.

^{1} On 25 September, Timoci Nagusa was called up to the squad to replace Waisea Nayacalevu, injured during Fiji's game with Australia.

^{2} On 27 September, Taniela Koroi was called up to the squad to replace Isei Colati, injured during Fiji's game with Australia.

Head coach: (New Zealand) John McKee

Player	Position	Date of birth (age)	Caps	Club/province
Sunia Koto	Hooker	15 April 1980 (aged 35)	43	(France) Narbonne
Talemaitoga Tuapati	Hooker	16 August 1984 (aged 31)	29	(France) Provence
Viliame Veikoso	Hooker	4 April 1982 (aged 33)	30	(England) Doncaster
Lee Roy Atalifo	Prop	10 May 1988 (aged 27)	2	(Fiji) Suva
Isei Colati ^{2}	Prop	23 December 1983 (aged 31)	7	(France) Nevers
Taniela Koroi ^{2}	Prop	8 February 1990 (aged 25)	2	(Italy) Mogliano
Campese Ma'afu	Prop	19 December 1984 (aged 30)	35	(France) Provence
Peni Ravai	Prop	16 June 1990 (aged 25)	9	(Fiji) Nadroga
Manasa Saulo	Prop	6 April 1989 (aged 26)	24	(Romania) Timișoara Saracens
Tevita Cavubati	Lock	12 August 1987 (aged 28)	8	(England) Worcester Warriors
Leone Nakarawa	Lock	2 April 1988 (aged 27)	31	(Scotland) Glasgow Warriors
Api Ratuniyarawa	Lock	11 July 1986 (aged 29)	16	(France) Agen
Nemia Soqeta	Lock	4 March 1985 (aged 30)	7	(France) Biarritz Olympique
Akapusi Qera (c)	Flanker	24 April 1984 (aged 31)	47	(France) Montpellier
Malakai Ravulo	Flanker	22 September 1983 (aged 31)	34	(Romania) Steaua București
Dominiko Waqaniburotu	Flanker	20 April 1986 (aged 29)	24	(France) Brive
Peceli Yato	Flanker	17 January 1993 (aged 22)	4	(France) Clermont
Sakiusa Matadigo	Number 8	8 August 1982 (aged 33)	20	(France) Lyon
Netani Talei	Number 8	19 March 1983 (aged 32)	30	(England) Harlequins
Nemia Kenatale	Scrum-half	21 January 1986 (aged 29)	34	(Romania) Farul Constanța
Nikola Matawalu	Scrum-half	8 March 1989 (aged 26)	26	(England) Bath
Henry Seniloli	Scrum-half	15 June 1989 (aged 26)	8	Unattached
Josh Matavesi	Fly-half	5 October 1990 (aged 24)	14	(Wales) Ospreys
Ben Volavola	Fly-half	13 January 1991 (aged 24)	5	(Australia) Waratahs
Levani Botia	Centre	14 March 1989 (aged 26)	5	(France) La Rochelle
Vereniki Goneva	Centre	5 April 1984 (aged 31)	35	(England) Leicester Tigers
Gabiriele Lovobalavu	Centre	20 June 1985 (aged 30)	20	(France) Bayonne
Nemani Nadolo	Wing	31 January 1988 (aged 27)	20	(New Zealand) Crusaders
Timoci Nagusa ^{1}	Wing	7 February 1987 (aged 28)	22	(France) Montpellier
Waisea Nayacalevu ^{1}	Wing	26 June 1990 (aged 25)	11	(France) Stade Français
Asaeli Tikoirotuma	Wing	24 June 1986 (aged 29)	14	(England) London Irish
Kini Murimurivalu	Fullback	15 May 1989 (aged 26)	11	(France) La Rochelle
Metuisela Talebula	Fullback	20 May 1991 (aged 24)	16	(France) Bordeaux Bègles

=== Uruguay ===
On 30 August, Uruguay announced their 31-man squad.

Head coach: (Uruguay) Pablo Lemoine

Player	Position	Date of birth (age)	Caps	Club/province
Germán Kessler	Hooker	1 July 1994 (aged 21)	11	(Uruguay) Los Cuervos
Nicolás Klappenbach	Hooker	25 March 1982 (aged 33)	46	(Uruguay) Champagnat
Carlos Arboleya	Prop	23 July 1985 (aged 30)	50	(Uruguay) Trébol de Paysandú
Alejo Corral	Prop	11 September 1981 (aged 34)	47	(Argentina) San Isidro
Oscar Durán	Prop	16 August 1980 (aged 35)	31	(Uruguay) Carrasco Polo
Mario Sagario	Prop	29 June 1986 (aged 29)	47	(France) Massy
Mateo Sanguinetti	Prop	26 July 1992 (aged 23)	14	(Uruguay) Los Cuervos
Franco Lamanna	Lock	5 October 1991 (aged 23)	22	(Uruguay) Carrasco Polo
Mathias Palomeque	Lock	10 July 1986 (aged 29)	24	(Uruguay) Trébol de Paysandú
Santiago Vilaseca (c)	Lock	17 September 1984 (aged 31)	33	(Uruguay) Old Boys
Jorge Zerbino	Lock	27 December 1991 (aged 23)	11	(Uruguay) Old Christians
Agustín Alonso	Flanker	24 September 1991 (aged 23)	12	(Uruguay) Montevideo
Fernando Bascou	Flanker	5 April 1987 (aged 28)	25	(Uruguay) Pucaru Stade Gaulois
Matías Beer	Flanker	16 December 1993 (aged 21)	11	(Uruguay) Old Christians
Juan de Freitas	Flanker	13 December 1989 (aged 25)	38	(Uruguay) Champagnat
Juan Manuel Gaminara	Flanker	1 May 1989 (aged 26)	23	(Uruguay) Old Boys
Diego Magno	Flanker	27 April 1989 (aged 26)	49	(Uruguay) Montevideo
Alejandro Nieto	Number 8	7 January 1988 (aged 27)	27	(Uruguay) Champagnat
Alejo Durán	Scrum-half	20 May 1991 (aged 24)	31	(Uruguay) Trébol de Paysandú
Agustín Ormaechea	Scrum-half	8 March 1991 (aged 24)	23	(France) Stade Montois
Felipe Berchesi	Fly-half	12 April 1991 (aged 24)	15	(France) Carcassonne
Manuel Blengio	Fly-half	28 April 1994 (aged 21)	10	(Uruguay) Old Christians
Joaquín Prada	Centre	15 July 1991 (aged 24)	28	(Uruguay) Los Cuervos
Alberto Román	Centre	1 June 1987 (aged 28)	36	(Uruguay) Pucaru Stade Gaulois
Andrés Vilaseca	Centre	8 May 1991 (aged 24)	12	(Uruguay) Old Boys
Francisco Bulanti	Wing	12 April 1980 (aged 35)	22	(Uruguay) Trébol de Paysandú
Jerónimo Etcheverry	Wing	11 January 1988 (aged 27)	42	(Uruguay) Carrasco Polo
Santiago Gibernau	Wing	15 May 1988 (aged 27)	32	(Uruguay) Carrasco Polo
Leandro Leivas	Wing	6 July 1988 (aged 27)	43	(Uruguay) Old Christians
Gastón Mieres	Fullback	5 October 1989 (aged 25)	37	(Italy) Valpolicella
Rodrigo Silva	Fullback	2 November 1992 (aged 22)	14	(Uruguay) Carrasco Polo

=== Wales ===
On 31 August, Wales announced their 31-man squad.

After injuries to Rhys Webb and Leigh Halfpenny during Wales' warm-up match against Italy, Mike Philips and Eli Walker were called up to replace the injured duo.

On 14 September, Eli Walker was released from the squad following injury and was replaced with Ross Moriarty.

^{1} On 21 September, Tyler Morgan was called up to the squad to replace Cory Allen who tore his hamstring in Wales's opening win against Uruguay.

^{2} On 28 September, Gareth Anscombe and James Hook were called up to the squad to replace Hallam Amos and Scott Williams who were injured in Wales's win against England.

^{3} On 11 October, Liam Williams was ruled out of the World Cup having suffered an injury against Australia, and Eli Walker re-joined the squad to replace him. Walker was allowed to re-join the squad, as he was released from the team before Wales officially arrived in tournament.

Head coach: (New Zealand) Warren Gatland

Player	Position	Date of birth (age)	Caps	Club/province
Scott Baldwin	Hooker	12 July 1988 (aged 27)	10	(Wales) Ospreys
Ken Owens	Hooker	3 January 1987 (aged 28)	29	(Wales) Scarlets
Tomas Francis	Prop	27 April 1992 (aged 23)	2	(England) Exeter Chiefs
Paul James	Prop	13 May 1982 (aged 33)	62	(Wales) Ospreys
Aaron Jarvis	Prop	20 May 1986 (aged 29)	13	(Wales) Ospreys
Gethin Jenkins	Prop	17 November 1980 (aged 34)	116	(Wales) Cardiff Blues
Samson Lee	Prop	30 November 1992 (aged 22)	12	(Wales) Scarlets
Jake Ball	Lock	21 June 1991 (aged 24)	14	(Wales) Scarlets
Luke Charteris	Lock	9 March 1983 (aged 32)	57	(France) Racing
Bradley Davies	Lock	9 January 1987 (aged 28)	46	(England) Wasps
Dominic Day	Lock	22 August 1985 (aged 30)	2	(England) Bath
Alun Wyn Jones	Lock	19 September 1985 (aged 29)	90	(Wales) Ospreys
James King	Flanker	24 July 1990 (aged 25)	6	(Wales) Ospreys
Dan Lydiate	Flanker	18 December 1987 (aged 27)	47	(Wales) Ospreys
Ross Moriarty	Flanker	18 April 1994 (aged 21)	2	(England) Gloucester
Justin Tipuric	Flanker	6 August 1989 (aged 26)	33	(Wales) Ospreys
Sam Warburton (c)	Flanker	5 October 1988 (aged 26)	55	(Wales) Cardiff Blues
Taulupe Faletau	Number 8	12 November 1990 (aged 24)	48	(Wales) Newport Gwent Dragons
Gareth Davies	Scrum-half	18 August 1990 (aged 25)	4	(Wales) Scarlets
Mike Phillips	Scrum-half	29 August 1982 (aged 33)	94	(France) Racing
Lloyd Williams	Scrum-half	30 November 1989 (aged 25)	19	(Wales) Cardiff Blues
Gareth Anscombe ^{2}	Fly-half	10 May 1991 (aged 24)	1	(Wales) Cardiff Blues
Dan Biggar	Fly-half	16 October 1989 (aged 25)	35	(Wales) Ospreys
Rhys Priestland	Fly-half	9 January 1987 (aged 28)	35	(England) Bath
Cory Allen ^{1}	Centre	11 February 1993 (aged 22)	3	(Wales) Cardiff Blues
James Hook ^{2}	Centre	27 June 1985 (aged 30)	78	(England) Gloucester
Tyler Morgan ^{1}	Centre	2 September 1995 (aged 20)	1	(Wales) Newport Gwent Dragons
Jamie Roberts	Centre	8 November 1986 (aged 28)	70	(England) Harlequins
Scott Williams ^{2}	Centre	10 October 1990 (aged 24)	32	(Wales) Scarlets
Hallam Amos ^{2}	Wing	24 September 1994 (aged 20)	3	(Wales) Newport Gwent Dragons
Alex Cuthbert	Wing	5 April 1990 (aged 25)	35	(Wales) Cardiff Blues
George North	Wing	13 April 1992 (aged 23)	51	(England) Northampton Saints
Eli Walker ^{3}	Wing	28 March 1992 (aged 23)	1	(Wales) Ospreys
Matthew Morgan	Fullback	23 April 1992 (aged 23)	3	(England) Bristol
Liam Williams ^{3}	Fullback	9 April 1991 (aged 24)	23	(Wales) Scarlets

== Pool B ==
=== Japan ===
On 31 August, Japan announced their 31-man squad.

Head coach: (Australia) Eddie Jones

Player	Position	Date of birth (age)	Caps	Club/province
Shota Horie	Hooker	21 January 1986 (aged 29)	38	(Japan) Panasonic Wild Knights
Takeshi Kizu	Hooker	15 July 1988 (aged 27)	37	(Japan) Kobelco Steelers
Hiroki Yuhara	Hooker	21 January 1984 (aged 31)	22	(Japan) Toshiba Brave Lupus
Kensuke Hatakeyama	Prop	2 August 1985 (aged 30)	68	(Japan) Suntory Sungoliath
Keita Inagaki	Prop	2 June 1990 (aged 25)	6	(Japan) Panasonic Wild Knights
Masataka Mikami	Prop	4 June 1988 (aged 27)	29	(Japan) Toshiba Brave Lupus
Hiroshi Yamashita	Prop	1 January 1986 (aged 29)	45	(Japan) Kobelco Steelers
Shoji Ito	Lock	2 December 1980 (aged 34)	34	(Japan) Kobelco Steelers
Shinya Makabe	Lock	26 March 1987 (aged 28)	31	(Japan) Suntory Sungoliath
Hitoshi Ono	Lock	6 May 1978 (aged 37)	94	(Japan) Toshiba Brave Lupus
Luke Thompson	Lock	16 April 1981 (aged 34)	58	(Japan) Kintetsu Liners
Michael Broadhurst	Flanker	30 October 1986 (aged 28)	22	(Japan) Ricoh Black Rams
Justin Ives	Flanker	24 May 1984 (aged 31)	29	(Japan) Canon Eagles
Michael Leitch (c)	Flanker	7 October 1988 (aged 26)	43	(New Zealand) Chiefs
Hendrik Tui	Flanker	13 December 1987 (aged 27)	32	(Australia) Queensland Reds
Koliniasi Holani	Number 8	25 October 1981 (aged 33)	41	(Japan) Panasonic Wild Knights
Amanaki Mafi	Number 8	11 January 1990 (aged 25)	3	(Japan) NTT Communications Shining Arcs
Atsushi Hiwasa	Scrum-half	22 May 1987 (aged 28)	47	(Japan) Suntory Sungoliath
Fumiaki Tanaka	Scrum-half	3 January 1985 (aged 30)	49	(New Zealand) Highlanders
Harumichi Tatekawa	Fly-half	2 December 1989 (aged 25)	38	(Japan) Kubota Spears
Kosei Ono	Fly-half	17 April 1987 (aged 28)	29	(Japan) Suntory Sungoliath
Kotaro Matsushima	Centre	26 February 1993 (aged 22)	12	(Japan) Suntory Sungoliath
Male Sa'u	Centre	13 October 1987 (aged 27)	23	(Japan) Yamaha Júbilo
Yu Tamura	Centre	9 January 1989 (aged 26)	32	(Japan) NEC Green Rockets
Craig Wing	Centre	26 December 1979 (aged 35)	10	(Japan) Kobelco Steelers
Yoshikazu Fujita	Wing	8 October 1993 (aged 21)	27	(Japan) Waseda University
Kenki Fukuoka	Wing	7 September 1992 (aged 23)	15	(Japan) Tsukuba University
Karne Hesketh	Wing	1 August 1985 (aged 30)	9	(Japan) Munakata Sanix Blues
Toshiaki Hirose	Wing	17 October 1981 (aged 33)	28	(Japan) Toshiba Brave Lupus
Akihito Yamada	Wing	26 July 1985 (aged 30)	13	(Japan) Panasonic Wild Knights
Ayumu Goromaru	Fullback	1 March 1986 (aged 29)	52	(Japan) Yamaha Júbilo

=== Samoa ===
On 11 August, Samoa announced their 31-man squad.

On 24 August, Faifili Levave was called up to replace Fa'atiga Lemalu who withdrew due to injury.

On 11 September, Census Johnston was called up to replace Logovi'i Mulipola.

Head coach: (Samoa) Stephen Betham

Player	Position	Date of birth (age)	Caps	Club/province
Ole Avei	Hooker	13 June 1983 (aged 32)	21	(France) Bordeaux Bègles
Manu Leiataua	Hooker	26 December 1986 (aged 28)	8	(France) Aurillac
Motu Matu'u	Hooker	30 April 1987 (aged 28)	3	(New Zealand) Hurricanes
Viliamu Afatia	Prop	24 May 1990 (aged 25)	11	(France) Agen
Jake Grey	Prop	17 February 1984 (aged 31)	4	(Samoa) SCOPA
Census Johnston	Prop	6 May 1981 (aged 34)	48	(France) Toulouse
Anthony Perenise	Prop	18 October 1982 (aged 32)	24	(England) Bristol
Sakaria Taulafo	Prop	29 January 1983 (aged 32)	36	(France) Stade Français
Filo Paulo	Lock	6 November 1987 (aged 27)	18	(Italy) Benetton Treviso
Joe Tekori	Lock	17 December 1983 (aged 31)	32	(France) Toulouse
Kane Thompson	Lock	9 January 1982 (aged 33)	31	(England) Newcastle Falcons
Maurie Fa'asavalu	Flanker	12 January 1980 (aged 35)	25	(France) Oyonnax
Alafoti Faosiliva	Flanker	28 October 1985 (aged 29)	13	(England) Bath
Jack Lam	Flanker	18 November 1987 (aged 27)	15	(England) Bristol
Faifili Levave	Flanker	15 January 1986 (aged 29)	6	Unattached
Ofisa Treviranus (c)	Flanker	31 March 1984 (aged 31)	32	(England) London Irish
TJ Ioane	Number 8	9 May 1989 (aged 26)	6	(England) Sale Sharks
Sanele Vavae Tuilagi	Number 8	15 June 1988 (aged 27)	4	(France) Carcassonne
Vavao Afemai	Scrum-half	18 February 1992 (aged 23)	5	(Samoa) Vaiala
Kahn Fotuali'i	Scrum-half	22 May 1982 (aged 33)	24	(England) Northampton Saints
Patrick Fa'apale	Fly-half	5 March 1991 (aged 24)	6	(Samoa) Vaiala
Tusi Pisi	Fly-half	18 June 1982 (aged 33)	21	(Japan) Suntory Sungoliath
Michael Stanley	Fly-half	29 December 1989 (aged 25)	6	Unattached
Rey Lee-Lo	Centre	20 February 1987 (aged 28)	2	(Wales) Cardiff Blues
Johnny Leota	Centre	21 January 1984 (aged 31)	19	(England) Sale Sharks
Paul Perez	Centre	26 July 1986 (aged 29)	11	(South Africa) Sharks
George Pisi	Centre	29 June 1986 (aged 29)	17	(England) Northampton Saints
Fa'atoina Autagavaia	Wing	18 September 1988 (aged 27)	16	(France) Nevers
Ken Pisi	Wing	24 February 1989 (aged 26)	6	(England) Northampton Saints
Alesana Tuilagi	Wing	24 February 1981 (aged 34)	34	(England) Newcastle Falcons
Tim Nanai-Williams	Fullback	12 June 1989 (aged 26)	1	(Japan) Ricoh Black Rams

=== Scotland ===
On 1 September, Scotland announced their 31-man squad.

On 14 September, Kevin Bryce replaced Stuart McInally in the squad following injury.

^{1} On 29 September, Blair Cowan replaced Grant Gilchrist in the squad following injury.

^{2} On 17 October, Rory Sutherland replaced Ryan Grant in the squad following injury.

Head coach: (New Zealand) Vern Cotter

Player	Position	Date of birth (age)	Caps	Club/province
Fraser Brown	Hooker	20 June 1989 (aged 26)	10	(Scotland) Glasgow Warriors
Kevin Bryce	Hooker	7 September 1988 (aged 27)	2	(Scotland) Glasgow Warriors
Ross Ford	Hooker	23 April 1984 (aged 31)	89	(Scotland) Edinburgh
Alasdair Dickinson	Prop	11 September 1983 (aged 32)	47	(Scotland) Edinburgh
Ryan Grant ^{2}	Prop	8 October 1985 (aged 29)	23	(Scotland) Glasgow Warriors
WP Nel	Prop	30 April 1986 (aged 29)	3	(Scotland) Edinburgh
Gordon Reid	Prop	4 March 1987 (aged 28)	12	(Scotland) Glasgow Warriors
Rory Sutherland ^{2}	Prop	24 August 1992 (aged 23)	0	(Scotland) Edinburgh
Jon Welsh	Prop	13 October 1986 (aged 28)	7	(England) Newcastle Falcons
Grant Gilchrist ^{1}	Lock	9 August 1990 (aged 25)	10	(Scotland) Edinburgh
Jonny Gray	Lock	14 March 1994 (aged 21)	15	(Scotland) Glasgow Warriors
Richie Gray	Lock	24 August 1989 (aged 26)	46	(France) Castres
Tim Swinson	Lock	17 February 1987 (aged 28)	13	(Scotland) Glasgow Warriors
Blair Cowan ^{1}	Flanker	21 April 1986 (aged 29)	13	(England) London Irish
John Hardie	Flanker	27 July 1988 (aged 27)	2	Unattached
Alasdair Strokosch	Flanker	21 February 1983 (aged 32)	46	(France) Perpignan
Ryan Wilson	Flanker	18 May 1989 (aged 26)	11	(Scotland) Glasgow Warriors
David Denton	Number 8	5 February 1990 (aged 25)	28	(Scotland) Edinburgh
Josh Strauss	Number 8	23 October 1986 (aged 28)	0	(Scotland) Glasgow Warriors
Sam Hidalgo-Clyne	Scrum-half	4 August 1993 (aged 22)	7	(Scotland) Edinburgh
Greig Laidlaw (c)	Scrum-half	12 October 1985 (aged 29)	41	(England) Gloucester
Henry Pyrgos	Scrum-half	9 July 1989 (aged 26)	16	(Scotland) Glasgow Warriors
Finn Russell	Fly-half	23 September 1992 (aged 22)	11	(Scotland) Glasgow Warriors
Duncan Weir	Fly-half	10 May 1991 (aged 24)	19	(Scotland) Glasgow Warriors
Mark Bennett	Centre	3 February 1993 (aged 22)	9	(Scotland) Glasgow Warriors
Peter Horne	Centre	5 October 1989 (aged 25)	10	(Scotland) Glasgow Warriors
Matt Scott	Centre	30 September 1990 (aged 24)	29	(Scotland) Edinburgh
Richie Vernon	Centre	7 July 1987 (aged 28)	22	(Scotland) Glasgow Warriors
Sean Lamont	Wing	15 January 1981 (aged 34)	97	(Scotland) Glasgow Warriors
Sean Maitland	Wing	14 September 1988 (aged 27)	16	(England) London Irish
Tommy Seymour	Wing	1 July 1988 (aged 27)	18	(Scotland) Glasgow Warriors
Tim Visser	Wing	29 May 1987 (aged 28)	21	(England) Harlequins
Stuart Hogg	Fullback	24 June 1992 (aged 23)	33	(Scotland) Glasgow Warriors

=== South Africa ===
On 28 August, South Africa announced their 31-man squad.

^{1} On 27 September, Jan Serfontein was called up to the squad to replace captain Jean de Villiers, injured during South Africa's game with Samoa.

Head coach: (South Africa) Heyneke Meyer

Player	Position	Date of birth (age)	Caps	Club/province
Schalk Brits	Hooker	16 May 1981 (aged 34)	8	(England) Saracens
Bismarck du Plessis	Hooker	22 May 1984 (aged 31)	73	(France) Montpellier
Adriaan Strauss	Hooker	18 November 1985 (aged 29)	48	(South Africa) Bulls
Jannie du Plessis	Prop	16 November 1982 (aged 32)	64	(France) Montpellier
Frans Malherbe	Prop	14 March 1991 (aged 24)	6	(South Africa) Stormers
Tendai Mtawarira	Prop	1 August 1985 (aged 30)	68	(South Africa) Sharks
Trevor Nyakane	Prop	4 May 1989 (aged 26)	16	(South Africa) Bulls
Coenie Oosthuizen	Prop	22 March 1989 (aged 26)	21	(South Africa) Cheetahs
Lood de Jager	Lock	17 December 1992 (aged 22)	12	(South Africa) Cheetahs
Pieter-Steph du Toit	Lock	20 August 1992 (aged 23)	4	(South Africa) Sharks
Eben Etzebeth	Lock	29 October 1991 (aged 23)	37	(South Africa) Stormers
Victor Matfield	Lock	11 May 1977 (aged 38)	123	(England) Northampton Saints
Willem Alberts	Flanker	11 May 1984 (aged 31)	33	(France) Stade Français
Schalk Burger	Flanker	13 April 1983 (aged 32)	79	(South Africa) Stormers
Siya Kolisi	Flanker	16 June 1991 (aged 24)	11	(South Africa) Stormers
Francois Louw	Flanker	15 June 1985 (aged 30)	36	(England) Bath
Duane Vermeulen	Number 8	3 July 1986 (aged 29)	29	(France) Toulon
Fourie du Preez	Scrum-half	24 March 1982 (aged 33)	70	(Japan) Suntory Sungoliath
Rudy Paige	Scrum-half	2 August 1989 (aged 26)	0	(South Africa) Bulls
Ruan Pienaar	Scrum-half	10 March 1984 (aged 31)	84	(Ireland) Ulster
Pat Lambie	Fly-half	17 October 1990 (aged 24)	44	(South Africa) Sharks
Handré Pollard	Fly-half	9 March 1994 (aged 21)	13	(South Africa) Bulls
Morné Steyn	Fly-half	11 July 1984 (aged 31)	59	(France) Stade Français
Damian de Allende	Centre	25 November 1991 (aged 23)	7	(South Africa) Stormers
Jean de Villiers (c) ^{1}	Centre	24 February 1981 (aged 34)	107	(South Africa) Stormers
Jesse Kriel	Centre	15 February 1994 (aged 21)	4	(South Africa) Bulls
Jan Serfontein ^{1}	Centre	15 April 1993 (aged 22)	21	(South Africa) Bulls
Bryan Habana	Wing	12 June 1983 (aged 32)	110	(France) Toulon
Lwazi Mvovo	Wing	3 June 1986 (aged 29)	13	(South Africa) Sharks
JP Pietersen	Wing	12 July 1986 (aged 29)	60	(South Africa) Sharks
Zane Kirchner	Fullback	16 June 1984 (aged 31)	30	(Ireland) Leinster
Willie le Roux	Fullback	18 August 1989 (aged 26)	28	(South Africa) Cheetahs

=== United States ===
On 1 September, the United States named their 31-man squad.

On 3 September, Scott LaValla was replaced by Matt Trouville following an injury suffered in training.

Head coach: (United States) Mike Tolkin

Player	Position	Date of birth (age)	Caps	Club/province
Zach Fenoglio	Hooker	29 July 1989 (aged 26)	13	(United States) Glendale Raptors
Phil Thiel	Hooker	29 October 1984 (aged 30)	32	(United States) Life University
Chris Baumann	Prop	18 May 1987 (aged 28)	4	(United States) Santa Monica
Eric Fry	Prop	14 September 1987 (aged 28)	33	(England) Newcastle Falcons
Olive Kilifi	Prop	28 September 1986 (aged 28)	12	(United States) Seattle Saracens
Titi Lamositele	Prop	11 February 1995 (aged 20)	13	(England) Saracens
Matekitonga Moeakiola	Prop	16 May 1978 (aged 37)	31	(France) Castanet
Joe Taufete'e	Prop	4 October 1992 (aged 22)	0	(United States) Belmont Shore
Cam Dolan	Lock	2 March 1990 (aged 25)	16	(Wales) Cardiff Blues
Greg Peterson	Lock	26 March 1991 (aged 24)	8	(Scotland) Glasgow Warriors
Hayden Smith	Lock	10 April 1985 (aged 30)	26	(England) Saracens
Louis Stanfill	Lock	30 May 1985 (aged 30)	55	(United States) Seattle Saracens
Andrew Durutalo	Flanker	25 October 1987 (aged 27)	9	(United States) USA Sevens
Matt Trouville	Flanker	9 June 1986 (aged 29)	4	(United States) Seattle Saracens
Alastair McFarland	Flanker	2 June 1989 (aged 26)	5	(United States) NYAC
John Quill	Flanker	10 March 1990 (aged 25)	14	(United States) NYAC
Danny Barrett	Number 8	23 March 1990 (aged 25)	9	(United States) USA Sevens
Samu Manoa	Number 8	5 March 1985 (aged 30)	11	(France) Toulon
Niku Kruger	Scrum-half	9 October 1991 (aged 23)	1	(United States) Glendale Raptors
Mike Petri	Scrum-half	16 August 1984 (aged 31)	54	(United States) NYAC
AJ MacGinty	Fly-half	26 February 1990 (aged 25)	5	(United States) Life University
Shalom Suniula	Fly-half	6 May 1988 (aged 27)	14	(United States) Seattle Saracens
Seamus Kelly	Centre	30 May 1991 (aged 24)	20	(United States) SFGG
Folau Niua	Centre	27 January 1985 (aged 30)	15	(United States) USA Sevens
Thretton Palamo	Centre	22 September 1988 (aged 26)	10	(England) London Welsh
Andrew Suniula	Centre	1 May 1982 (aged 33)	37	(Romania) București
Takudzwa Ngwenya	Wing	22 July 1985 (aged 30)	32	(France) Biarritz Olympique
Blaine Scully	Wing	29 February 1988 (aged 27)	26	(Wales) Cardiff Blues
Zack Test	Wing	13 October 1989 (aged 25)	4	(United States) USA Sevens
Brett Thompson	Wing	17 August 1990 (aged 25)	4	(United States) USA Sevens
Chris Wyles (c)	Fullback	13 September 1983 (aged 32)	50	(England) Saracens

== Pool C ==
=== Argentina ===
On 16 August, Argentina announced their initial 31-man squad.

Hours after the 31-man squad was announced, Matías Díaz suffered an injury and was replaced in the squad by Juan Pablo Orlandi.

^{1} On 15 October, Juan Figallo was called up to the squad to replace Nahuel Tetaz Chaparro after he suffered an injury in training.

^{2} Due to an injury to Agustín Creevy, usual prop Lucas Noguera Paz will cover hooker from the bench against South Africa in the Bronze Final. However, an injury sustained in training for prop Marcos Ayerza ruled him out of the Bronze Final the day before the match, and Santiago García Botta was called up as his replacement. As there was no further cover for prop, García Botta was cleared to play in the match, despite the stand-down period of 48 hours before an injury replacement can take the field, though he is only permitted to play if absolutely required.

Head coach: (Argentina) Daniel Hourcade

Player	Position	Date of birth (age)	Caps	Club/province
Agustín Creevy (c)	Hooker	15 March 1985 (aged 30)	40	(Argentina) UAR
Julián Montoya	Hooker	29 October 1993 (aged 21)	9	(Argentina) UAR
Marcos Ayerza ^{2}	Prop	12 January 1983 (aged 32)	60	(England) Leicester Tigers
Juan Figallo ^{1}	Prop	25 March 1988 (aged 27)	22	(England) Saracens
Santiago García Botta ^{2}	Prop	19 June 1992 (aged 23)	5	(Argentina) UAR
Ramiro Herrera	Prop	14 February 1989 (aged 26)	13	(Argentina) UAR
Lucas Noguera Paz	Prop	10 May 1993 (aged 22)	16	(Argentina) UAR
Juan Pablo Orlandi	Prop	20 June 1983 (aged 32)	16	Unattached
Nahuel Tetaz Chaparro ^{1}	Prop	6 November 1989 (aged 25)	20	(Argentina) UAR
Matías Alemanno	Lock	5 December 1991 (aged 23)	14	(Argentina) UAR
Mariano Galarza	Lock	12 November 1986 (aged 28)	24	(England) Gloucester
Tomás Lavanini	Lock	22 January 1993 (aged 22)	21	(Argentina) UAR
Guido Petti	Lock	17 November 1994 (aged 20)	6	(Argentina) UAR
Juan Martín Fernández Lobbe	Flanker	19 November 1981 (aged 33)	64	(France) Toulon
Juan Manuel Leguizamón	Flanker	6 June 1983 (aged 32)	62	(Argentina) UAR
Pablo Matera	Flanker	18 July 1993 (aged 22)	16	(Argentina) UAR
Javier Ortega Desio	Flanker	14 June 1990 (aged 25)	16	(Argentina) UAR
Facundo Isa	Number 8	21 September 1993 (aged 21)	7	(Argentina) UAR
Leonardo Senatore	Number 8	13 May 1984 (aged 31)	31	Unattached
Tomás Cubelli	Scrum-half	12 June 1989 (aged 26)	38	(Argentina) UAR
Martín Landajo	Scrum-half	14 June 1988 (aged 27)	46	(Argentina) UAR
Santiago González Iglesias	Fly-half	16 June 1988 (aged 27)	18	(Argentina) UAR
Nicolás Sánchez	Fly-half	26 October 1988 (aged 26)	33	(Argentina) UAR
Marcelo Bosch	Centre	7 January 1984 (aged 31)	35	(England) Saracens
Jerónimo de la Fuente	Centre	24 February 1991 (aged 24)	13	(Argentina) UAR
Juan Martín Hernández	Centre	7 August 1982 (aged 33)	53	(Argentina) UAR
Matías Moroni	Centre	29 March 1991 (aged 24)	4	(Argentina) UAR
Juan Pablo Socino	Centre	30 May 1988 (aged 27)	2	(England) Newcastle Falcons
Horacio Agulla	Wing	22 October 1984 (aged 30)	60	(England) Bath
Santiago Cordero	Wing	6 December 1993 (aged 21)	12	(Argentina) UAR
Juan Imhoff	Wing	11 May 1988 (aged 27)	29	(France) Racing
Lucas González Amorosino	Fullback	2 November 1985 (aged 29)	43	Unattached
Joaquín Tuculet	Fullback	8 August 1989 (aged 26)	23	(Argentina) UAR

=== Georgia ===
On 1 September, Georgia announced their 31-man squad.

^{1} On 29 September, Anton Peikrishvili was called up to the squad to replace Davit Kubriashvili, injured during Georgia's game with Argentina.

Head coach: (New Zealand) Milton Haig

Player	Position	Date of birth (age)	Caps	Club/province
Jaba Bregvadze	Hooker	23 April 1987 (aged 28)	29	(Georgia (country)) Kochebi Bolnisi
Shalva Mamukashvili	Hooker	2 October 1990 (aged 24)	31	(England) Sale Sharks
Simon Maisuradze	Hooker	14 September 1986 (aged 29)	32	(France) La Voulte-Valence
Kakha Asieshvili	Prop	21 April 1987 (aged 28)	11	(France) Brive
Levan Chilachava	Prop	17 August 1991 (aged 24)	25	(France) Toulon
Davit Kubriashvili ^{1}	Prop	12 March 1986 (aged 29)	40	(France) Stade Français
Mikheil Nariashvili	Prop	25 May 1990 (aged 25)	28	(France) Montpellier
Anton Peikrishvili ^{1}	Prop	18 September 1987 (aged 28)	16	(France) Bayonne
Davit Zirakashvili	Prop	20 September 1983 (aged 31)	50	(France) Clermont
Giorgi Chkhaidze	Lock	24 June 1982 (aged 33)	85	(France) Lille
Levan Datunashvili	Lock	18 January 1983 (aged 32)	71	(France) Aurillac
Konstantin Mikautadze	Lock	7 January 1991 (aged 24)	36	(France) Toulon
Giorgi Nemsadze	Lock	26 September 1984 (aged 30)	51	(France) Tarbes
Mamuka Gorgodze (c)	Flanker	14 July 1984 (aged 31)	61	(France) Toulon
Viktor Kolelishvili	Flanker	9 October 1989 (aged 25)	32	(France) Clermont
Shalva Sutiashvili	Flanker	24 January 1984 (aged 31)	49	(France) Massy
Giorgi Tkhilaishvili	Flanker	8 April 1991 (aged 24)	21	(Georgia (country)) Batumi
Lasha Lomidze	Number 8	30 June 1992 (aged 23)	13	(France) Béziers Hérault
Giorgi Begadze	Scrum-half	4 March 1986 (aged 29)	36	(Georgia (country)) Kochebi Bolnisi
Vazha Khutsishvili	Scrum-half	2 September 1992 (aged 23)	20	(Georgia (country)) Rustavi Kharebi
Vasil Lobzhanidze	Scrum-half	14 October 1996 (aged 18)	6	(Georgia (country)) Armazi Tbilisi
Lasha Khmaladze	Fly-half	20 January 1988 (aged 27)	39	(Georgia (country)) Lelo Saracens
Lasha Malaghuradze	Fly-half	2 January 1986 (aged 29)	58	(France) Stade Bagnérais
Davit Kacharava	Centre	16 January 1985 (aged 30)	83	(Russia) Enisey-STM
Merab Sharikadze	Centre	17 May 1993 (aged 22)	36	(France) Aurillac
Tamaz Mchedlidze	Centre	17 March 1993 (aged 22)	31	(France) Agen
Giorgi Aptsiauri	Wing	20 January 1994 (aged 21)	10	(Georgia (country)) AIA Kutaisi
Muraz Giorgadze	Wing	28 June 1994 (aged 21)	7	(Georgia (country)) Armazi Tbilisi
Giorgi Pruidze	Wing	2 June 1994 (aged 21)	4	(Georgia (country)) AIA Kutaisi
Alexander Todua	Wing	2 November 1987 (aged 27)	48	(Georgia (country)) Lelo Saracens
Merab Kvirikashvili	Fullback	27 December 1983 (aged 31)	85	(France) Montluçon
Beka Tsiklauri	Fullback	9 February 1989 (aged 26)	20	(Georgia (country)) Locomotive Tbilisi

=== Namibia ===
On 27 August, Namibia announced their 31-man squad.

Head coach (Wales) Phil Davies

Player	Position	Date of birth (age)	Caps	Club/province
Torsten van Jaarsveld	Hooker	30 June 1987 (aged 28)	7	(South Africa) Cheetahs
Louis van der Westhuizen	Hooker	25 February 1995 (aged 20)	2	(South Africa) Leopards
Aranos Coetzee	Prop	14 March 1988 (aged 27)	5	(South Africa) Cheetahs
AJ de Klerk	Prop	19 December 1987 (aged 27)	5	(Namibia) Wanderers
Jaco Engels	Prop	17 December 1980 (aged 34)	12	(Namibia) Trustco United
Raoul Larson	Prop	14 May 1984 (aged 31)	6	(South Africa) Eagles
Johnny Redelinghuys	Prop	2 February 1984 (aged 31)	47	(Namibia) Wanderers
Casper Viviers	Prop	1 June 1988 (aged 27)	13	(Namibia) Trustco United
Tjiuee Uanivi	Lock	31 December 1990 (aged 24)	10	(France) Brive
Janco Venter	Lock	19 September 1994 (aged 20)	8	(South Africa) Maties
Renaldo Bothma	Flanker	18 September 1989 (aged 26)	7	(Japan) Toyota Verblitz
Jacques Burger (c)	Flanker	29 July 1983 (aged 32)	35	(England) Saracens
Wian Conradie	Flanker	14 October 1994 (aged 20)	1	(South Africa) Johannesburg Uni.
Tinus du Plessis	Flanker	20 May 1984 (aged 31)	44	(Namibia) Wanderers
Rohan Kitshoff	Flanker	13 September 1985 (aged 30)	22	(South Africa) Durbanville-Bellville
Leneve Damens	Number 8	30 May 1993 (aged 22)	3	(Namibia) Wanderers
PJ van Lill	Number 8	4 December 1983 (aged 31)	39	(France) Bayonne
Eniell Buitendag	Scrum-half	21 June 1989 (aged 26)	13	(Namibia) Wanderers
Eugene Jantjies	Scrum-half	8 October 1986 (aged 28)	45	(Romania) Dinamo București
Damian Stevens	Scrum-half	2 June 1995 (aged 20)	1	(South Africa) Ikey Tigers
Theuns Kotzé	Fly-half	16 July 1987 (aged 28)	25	(France) Bourg-en-Bresse
Darryl de la Harpe	Centre	2 October 1986 (aged 28)	27	(Namibia) Western Suburbs
Johan Deysel	Centre	26 September 1991 (aged 23)	9	(South Africa) Leopards
JC Greyling	Centre	21 June 1991 (aged 24)	8	(Ireland) Old Wesley
Danie van Wyk	Centre	30 March 1986 (aged 29)	13	(Namibia) Trustco United
Conrad Marais	Wing	26 April 1989 (aged 26)	8	(France) Béziers Hérault
David Philander	Wing	4 January 1987 (aged 28)	23	(New Zealand) Spotswood United
Heinrich Smit	Wing	21 November 1990 (aged 24)	11	(South Africa) NWU Pukke
Russell van Wyk	Wing	12 August 1990 (aged 25)	4	(Namibia) Western Suburbs
Chrysander Botha	Fullback	13 July 1988 (aged 27)	34	(England) Exeter Chiefs
Johann Tromp	Fullback	23 December 1990 (aged 24)	18	(Namibia) Wanderers

=== New Zealand ===
On 30 August, New Zealand announced their 31-man squad.

^{1} On 10 October, Joe Moody was called up to the squad to replace Tony Woodcock, injured during New Zealand's game with Tonga.

^{2} On 29 October, Pauliasi Manu was called up to the squad to replace Wyatt Crockett, injured during New Zealand's game with France.

Head coach: (New Zealand) Steve Hansen

Player	Position	Date of birth (age)	Caps	Franchise/province
Dane Coles	Hooker	10 December 1986 (aged 28)	30	Hurricanes / Wellington
Keven Mealamu	Hooker	20 March 1979 (aged 36)	126	Blues / Auckland
Codie Taylor	Hooker	31 March 1991 (aged 24)	3	Crusaders / Canterbury
Wyatt Crockett ^{2}	Prop	24 January 1983 (aged 32)	40	Crusaders / Canterbury
Charlie Faumuina	Prop	24 December 1986 (aged 28)	27	Blues / Auckland
Ben Franks	Prop	27 March 1984 (aged 31)	43	Hurricanes / Hawke's Bay
Owen Franks	Prop	23 December 1987 (aged 27)	72	Crusaders / Canterbury
Pauliasi Manu ^{2}	Prop	23 December 1987 (aged 27)	0	Chiefs / Counties Manukau
Joe Moody ^{1}	Prop	18 September 1988 (aged 27)	8	Crusaders / Canterbury
Tony Woodcock ^{1}	Prop	27 January 1981 (aged 34)	115	Blues / North Harbour
Brodie Retallick	Lock	31 May 1991 (aged 24)	41	Chiefs / Hawke's Bay
Luke Romano	Lock	16 February 1986 (aged 29)	20	Crusaders / Canterbury
Sam Whitelock	Lock	12 October 1988 (aged 26)	66	Crusaders / Canterbury
Sam Cane	Flanker	13 January 1992 (aged 23)	24	Chiefs / Bay of Plenty
Jerome Kaino	Flanker	6 April 1983 (aged 32)	60	Blues / Auckland
Richie McCaw (c)	Flanker	31 December 1980 (aged 34)	142	Crusaders / Canterbury
Liam Messam	Flanker	25 March 1984 (aged 31)	42	Chiefs / Waikato
Kieran Read	Number 8	26 October 1985 (aged 29)	77	Crusaders / Canterbury
Victor Vito	Number 8	27 March 1987 (aged 28)	28	Hurricanes / Wellington
Tawera Kerr-Barlow	Scrum-half	15 August 1990 (aged 25)	15	Chiefs / Waikato
TJ Perenara	Scrum-half	23 January 1992 (aged 23)	15	Hurricanes / Wellington
Aaron Smith	Scrum-half	21 November 1988 (aged 26)	41	Highlanders / Manawatu
Beauden Barrett	Fly-half	27 May 1991 (aged 24)	30	Hurricanes / Taranaki
Dan Carter	Fly-half	5 March 1982 (aged 33)	106	Crusaders / Canterbury
Colin Slade	Fly-half	10 October 1987 (aged 27)	20	Crusaders / Canterbury
Malakai Fekitoa	Centre	10 May 1992 (aged 23)	11	Highlanders / Auckland
Ma'a Nonu	Centre	21 May 1982 (aged 33)	97	Hurricanes / Wellington
Conrad Smith	Centre	12 October 1981 (aged 33)	88	Hurricanes / Wellington
Sonny Bill Williams	Centre	3 August 1985 (aged 30)	26	Chiefs / Counties Manukau
Nehe Milner-Skudder	Wing	15 December 1990 (aged 24)	2	Hurricanes / Manawatu
Waisake Naholo	Wing	8 May 1991 (aged 24)	1	Highlanders / Taranaki
Julian Savea	Wing	7 August 1990 (aged 25)	35	Hurricanes / Wellington
Ben Smith	Fullback	1 June 1986 (aged 29)	41	Highlanders / Otago

=== Tonga ===
On 18 August, Tonga announced their 30-man squad, with an additional player yet to be named.

On 31 August, Tonga announced the 31st player to complete their squad.

Head coach: (Tonga) Mana Otai

Player	Position	Date of birth (age)	Caps	Club/province
Aleki Lutui	Hooker	1 July 1978 (aged 37)	36	(England) Ampthill
Paul Ngauamo	Hooker	19 February 1986 (aged 29)	3	(France) Stade Montois
Elvis Taione	Hooker	25 May 1983 (aged 32)	18	(England) Exeter Chiefs
Halani Aulika	Prop	31 August 1983 (aged 32)	13	(England) London Irish
Tevita Mailau	Prop	25 April 1985 (aged 30)	16	(France) Perpignan
Sila Puafisi	Prop	15 April 1988 (aged 27)	19	(Scotland) Glasgow Warriors
Sona Taumalolo	Prop	13 November 1981 (aged 33)	17	(France) Grenoble
Soane Tongaʻuiha	Prop	21 January 1982 (aged 33)	15	(France) Oyonnax
Uili Koloʻofai	Lock	29 September 1982 (aged 32)	5	Unattached
Tukulua Lokotui	Lock	31 December 1979 (aged 35)	24	(France) Béziers Hérault
Steve Mafi	Lock	9 December 1989 (aged 25)	14	(Australia) Western Force
Joe Tuineau	Lock	18 August 1981 (aged 34)	22	(France) Dax
Sione Kalamafoni	Flanker	18 May 1988 (aged 27)	25	(England) Gloucester
Nili Latu (c)	Flanker	19 February 1982 (aged 33)	40	(England) Newcastle Falcons
Jack Ram	Flanker	14 January 1987 (aged 28)	2	(New Zealand) Blues
Hale T-Pole	Flanker	30 April 1979 (aged 36)	31	Unattached
Opeti Fonua	Number 8	26 May 1986 (aged 29)	6	(England) Leicester Tigers
Viliami Maʻafu	Number 8	9 March 1982 (aged 33)	24	(France) Oyonnax
Samisoni Fisilau	Scrum-half	29 November 1987 (aged 27)	15	(England) Jersey
Sosefo Maʻake	Scrum-half	15 September 1991 (aged 24)	1	(Tonga) Havelu Bulldogs
Sonatane Takulua	Scrum-half	1 November 1991 (aged 23)	10	(England) Newcastle Falcons
Latiume Fosita	Fly-half	25 July 1992 (aged 23)	12	(England) Doncaster
Kurt Morath	Fly-half	13 November 1984 (aged 30)	26	Unattached
Sione Piukala	Centre	8 June 1985 (aged 30)	14	(France) Perpignan
Siale Piutau	Centre	13 October 1985 (aged 29)	20	(Japan) Yamaha Júbilo
Viliami Tahituʻa	Centre	2 October 1991 (aged 23)	2	Unattached
David Halaifonua	Wing	5 July 1987 (aged 28)	13	(England) Gloucester
William Helu	Wing	19 April 1986 (aged 29)	20	(Scotland) Edinburgh
Fetuʻu Vainikolo	Wing	30 January 1985 (aged 30)	22	(France) Oyonnax
Telusa Veainu	Wing	26 December 1990 (aged 24)	4	(Australia) Melbourne Rebels
Vunga Lilo	Fullback	28 February 1983 (aged 32)	38	(France) Montauban

== Pool D ==
=== Canada ===
On 25 August, Canada announced their 31-man squad.

On 10 September, Jake Ilnicki was called up to replace the injured Jason Marshall.

^{1} On 24 September, James Pritchard was called up to the squad to replace Liam Underwood, injured during Canada's opening game with Ireland.

^{2} On 28 September, Pat Parfrey was called up to the squad to replace Connor Braid, injured during Canada's game with Italy.

Head coach: (New Zealand) Kieran Crowley

Player	Position	Date of birth (age)	Caps	Club/province
Ray Barkwill	Hooker	26 August 1980 (aged 35)	22	(Canada) Ontario Blues
Aaron Carpenter	Hooker	9 January 1983 (aged 32)	67	(England) Cornish Pirates
Benoît Piffero	Hooker	21 May 1987 (aged 28)	9	(Canada) Atlantic Rock
Hubert Buydens	Prop	4 January 1982 (aged 33)	35	(Canada) Prairie Wolf Pack
Jake Ilnicki	Prop	24 February 1992 (aged 23)	8	(Australia) NSW Country Eagles
Djustice Sears-Duru	Prop	24 May 1994 (aged 21)	8	(Canada) Ontario Blues
Andrew Tiedemann	Prop	21 July 1988 (aged 27)	35	(Canada) Prairie Wolf Pack
Doug Wooldridge	Prop	19 December 1985 (aged 29)	19	(Canada) Ontario Blues
Brett Beukeboom	Lock	13 August 1989 (aged 26)	15	(England) Cornish Pirates
Jamie Cudmore	Lock	6 September 1978 (aged 37)	35	(France) Clermont
Evan Olmstead	Lock	21 February 1991 (aged 24)	5	(Australia) Greater Sydney Rams
Nanyak Dala	Flanker	18 June 1984 (aged 31)	34	(Canada) Prairie Wolf Pack
Kyle Gilmour	Flanker	26 January 1988 (aged 27)	11	(England) Rotherham
John Moonlight	Flanker	2 July 1987 (aged 28)	20	(Canada) Ontario Blues
Jebb Sinclair	Flanker	8 April 1986 (aged 29)	39	(England) London Irish
Tyler Ardron (c)	Number 8	16 June 1991 (aged 24)	20	(Wales) Ospreys
Richard Thorpe	Number 8	1 November 1984 (aged 30)	6	(England) London Welsh
Phil Mack	Scrum-half	18 September 1985 (aged 30)	27	(Canada) BC Bears
Jamie Mackenzie	Scrum-half	28 February 1989 (aged 26)	7	(Canada) Ontario Blues
Gordon McRorie	Scrum-half	12 May 1988 (aged 27)	12	(Canada) Prairie Wolf Pack
Nathan Hirayama	Fly-half	23 March 1988 (aged 27)	19	(Canada) BC Bears
Liam Underwood ^{1}	Fly-half	3 June 1991 (aged 24)	10	(Canada) Ontario Blues
Nick Blevins	Centre	11 November 1988 (aged 26)	25	(Canada) Prairie Wolf Pack
Connor Braid ^{2}	Centre	31 May 1990 (aged 25)	18	(Canada) BC Bears
Ciaran Hearn	Centre	30 December 1985 (aged 29)	45	(Canada) Atlantic Rock
Pat Parfrey ^{2}	Centre	1 November 1991 (aged 23)	7	(Canada) Atlantic Rock
Conor Trainor	Centre	12 May 1989 (aged 26)	18	(Canada) BC Bears
Jeff Hassler	Wing	21 August 1991 (aged 24)	15	(Wales) Ospreys
Phil Mackenzie	Wing	25 February 1987 (aged 28)	27	(England) Sale Sharks
D. T. H. van der Merwe	Wing	28 April 1986 (aged 29)	35	(Wales) Scarlets
Matt Evans	Fullback	2 January 1988 (aged 27)	29	(England) Cornish Pirates
Harry Jones	Fullback	26 August 1989 (aged 26)	17	(Canada) BC Bears
James Pritchard ^{1}	Fullback	21 July 1979 (aged 36)	61	(England) Bedford Blues

=== France ===
On 23 August, France announced their 31-man squad.

^{1} On 20 September, Rémy Grosso was called up to the squad to replace Yoann Huget, injured during France's opening game with Italy.

Head coach: (France) Philippe Saint-André

Player	Position	Date of birth (age)	Caps	Club/province
Guilhem Guirado	Hooker	17 June 1986 (aged 29)	34	Toulon
Benjamin Kayser	Hooker	26 July 1984 (aged 31)	33	Clermont
Dimitri Szarzewski	Hooker	26 January 1983 (aged 32)	81	Racing
Uini Atonio	Prop	26 March 1990 (aged 25)	9	La Rochelle
Eddy Ben Arous	Prop	25 August 1990 (aged 25)	7	Racing
Vincent Debaty	Prop	2 October 1981 (aged 33)	32	Clermont
Nicolas Mas	Prop	23 May 1980 (aged 35)	80	Montpellier
Rabah Slimani	Prop	18 October 1989 (aged 25)	17	Stade Français
Alexandre Flanquart	Lock	9 October 1989 (aged 25)	15	Stade Français
Yoann Maestri	Lock	14 January 1988 (aged 27)	38	Toulouse
Pascal Papé	Lock	5 October 1980 (aged 34)	61	Stade Français
Thierry Dusautoir (c)	Flanker	18 November 1981 (aged 33)	76	Toulouse
Bernard Le Roux	Flanker	4 June 1989 (aged 26)	18	Racing
Yannick Nyanga	Flanker	19 December 1983 (aged 31)	43	Racing
Fulgence Ouedraogo	Flanker	21 July 1986 (aged 29)	37	Montpellier
Damien Chouly	Number 8	27 November 1985 (aged 29)	31	Clermont
Louis Picamoles	Number 8	5 February 1986 (aged 29)	47	Toulouse
Rory Kockott	Scrum-half	25 June 1986 (aged 29)	9	Castres
Morgan Parra	Scrum-half	15 November 1988 (aged 26)	61	Clermont
Sébastien Tillous-Borde	Scrum-half	29 April 1985 (aged 30)	16	Toulon
Frédéric Michalak	Fly-half	16 October 1982 (aged 32)	73	Toulon
Rémi Talès	Fly-half	2 May 1984 (aged 31)	19	Racing
Mathieu Bastareaud	Centre	17 September 1988 (aged 27)	35	Toulon
Alexandre Dumoulin	Centre	24 August 1989 (aged 26)	4	Racing
Gaël Fickou	Centre	26 March 1994 (aged 21)	13	Toulouse
Wesley Fofana	Centre	20 January 1988 (aged 27)	35	Clermont
Rémy Grosso ^{1}	Wing	4 December 1988 (aged 26)	0	Castres
Sofiane Guitoune	Wing	27 March 1989 (aged 26)	4	Bordeaux Bègles
Yoann Huget ^{1}	Wing	2 June 1987 (aged 28)	40	Toulouse
Noa Nakaitaci	Wing	11 July 1990 (aged 25)	4	Clermont
Brice Dulin	Fullback	13 April 1990 (aged 25)	20	Racing
Scott Spedding	Fullback	4 May 1986 (aged 29)	10	Clermont

=== Ireland ===
On 1 September, Ireland named their 31-man squad.

^{1} On 10 October, Jared Payne was ruled out of the World Cup having suffered an injury against Romania. He was replaced by Issac Boss on 17 October 2015.

^{2} On 12 October, Rhys Ruddock was called into replace Peter O'Mahony, who was ruled out of the World Cup having suffered knee ligament damage against France.

^{3} On 13 October, Mike McCarthy was called into replace Paul O'Connell, ruled out of the World Cup after tearing his hamstring during the group stage victory over France.

Head coach: (New Zealand) Joe Schmidt

Player	Position	Date of birth (age)	Caps	Club/province
Rory Best	Hooker	15 August 1982 (aged 33)	85	(Ireland) Ulster
Seán Cronin	Hooker	6 May 1986 (aged 29)	45	(Ireland) Leinster
Richardt Strauss	Hooker	29 January 1986 (aged 29)	10	(Ireland) Leinster
Tadhg Furlong	Prop	14 November 1992 (aged 22)	2	(Ireland) Leinster
Cian Healy	Prop	7 October 1987 (aged 27)	51	(Ireland) Leinster
Jack McGrath	Prop	11 October 1989 (aged 25)	20	(Ireland) Leinster
Mike Ross	Prop	21 December 1979 (aged 35)	52	(Ireland) Leinster
Nathan White	Prop	4 September 1981 (aged 34)	3	(Ireland) Connacht
Iain Henderson	Lock	21 February 1992 (aged 23)	19	(Ireland) Ulster
Mike McCarthy ^{3}	Lock	27 November 1981 (aged 33)	17	(Ireland) Leinster
Paul O'Connell (c) ^{3}	Lock	20 October 1979 (aged 35)	104	(Ireland) Munster
Donnacha Ryan	Lock	11 December 1983 (aged 31)	31	(Ireland) Munster
Devin Toner	Lock	29 June 1986 (aged 29)	27	(Ireland) Leinster
Chris Henry	Flanker	17 October 1984 (aged 30)	19	(Ireland) Ulster
Jordi Murphy	Flanker	22 April 1991 (aged 24)	12	(Ireland) Leinster
Seán O'Brien	Flanker	14 February 1987 (aged 28)	37	(Ireland) Leinster
Peter O'Mahony ^{2}	Flanker	17 September 1989 (aged 26)	32	(Ireland) Munster
Rhys Ruddock ^{2}	Flanker	13 November 1990 (aged 24)	5	(Ireland) Leinster
Jamie Heaslip	Number 8	15 December 1983 (aged 31)	75	(Ireland) Leinster
Isaac Boss ^{1}	Scrum-half	9 April 1980 (aged 35)	22	(Ireland) Leinster
Conor Murray	Scrum-half	20 April 1989 (aged 26)	37	(Ireland) Munster
Eoin Reddan	Scrum-half	20 November 1980 (aged 34)	64	(Ireland) Leinster
Paddy Jackson	Fly-half	5 January 1992 (aged 23)	12	(Ireland) Ulster
Ian Madigan	Fly-half	21 March 1989 (aged 26)	21	(Ireland) Leinster
Johnny Sexton	Fly-half	11 July 1985 (aged 30)	53	(Ireland) Leinster
Darren Cave	Centre	5 April 1987 (aged 28)	10	(Ireland) Ulster
Keith Earls	Centre	2 October 1987 (aged 27)	41	(Ireland) Munster
Robbie Henshaw	Centre	12 June 1993 (aged 22)	12	(Ireland) Connacht
Jared Payne ^{1}	Centre	13 October 1985 (aged 29)	8	(Ireland) Ulster
Tommy Bowe	Wing	22 February 1984 (aged 31)	63	(Ireland) Ulster
Luke Fitzgerald	Wing	13 September 1987 (aged 28)	30	(Ireland) Leinster
Dave Kearney	Wing	19 June 1989 (aged 26)	10	(Ireland) Leinster
Simon Zebo	Wing	16 March 1990 (aged 25)	18	(Ireland) Munster
Rob Kearney	Fullback	26 March 1986 (aged 29)	63	(Ireland) Leinster

=== Italy ===
On 24 August, Italy announced their 31-man squad.

On 1 September, Simone Favaro was called up to the squad to replace the injured Angelo Esposito.

On 10 September, Enrico Bacchin was called up to the squad to replace the injured Luca Morisi.

^{1} On 21 September, Michele Visentin was called up to the squad to replace Andrea Masi, injured during Italy's opening game with France.

^{2} On 5 October, Alberto De Marchi and Andrea Lovotti were called up to the squad to replace the injured Martin Castrogiovanni and Michele Rizzo.

Head coach: (France) Jacques Brunel

Player	Position	Date of birth (age)	Caps	Club/province
Leonardo Ghiraldini	Hooker	26 December 1984 (aged 30)	78	(England) Leicester Tigers
Davide Giazzon	Hooker	16 January 1986 (aged 29)	21	(Italy) Benetton Treviso
Andrea Manici	Hooker	28 April 1990 (aged 25)	13	(Italy) Zebre
Matías Agüero	Prop	13 February 1981 (aged 34)	36	Unattached
Martin Castrogiovanni ^{2}	Prop	21 October 1981 (aged 33)	113	(France) Racing
Dario Chistolini	Prop	14 September 1988 (aged 27)	11	(Italy) Zebre
Lorenzo Cittadini	Prop	17 December 1982 (aged 32)	40	(England) Wasps
Alberto De Marchi ^{2}	Prop	13 March 1986 (aged 29)	28	(Italy) Benetton Treviso
Andrea Lovotti ^{2}	Prop	28 July 1989 (aged 26)	0	(Italy) Zebre
Michele Rizzo ^{2}	Prop	16 September 1982 (aged 33)	19	(England) Leicester Tigers
Valerio Bernabò	Lock	3 March 1984 (aged 31)	25	(Italy) Zebre
Joshua Furno	Lock	21 October 1989 (aged 25)	31	(England) Newcastle Falcons
Marco Fuser	Lock	9 March 1991 (aged 24)	5	(Italy) Benetton Treviso
Quintin Geldenhuys	Lock	19 June 1981 (aged 34)	57	(Italy) Zebre
Mauro Bergamasco	Flanker	1 May 1979 (aged 36)	104	Unattached
Simone Favaro	Flanker	7 November 1988 (aged 26)	24	(Scotland) Glasgow Warriors
Francesco Minto	Flanker	20 May 1987 (aged 28)	19	(Italy) Benetton Treviso
Samuela Vunisa	Flanker	19 August 1988 (aged 27)	8	(England) Saracens
Alessandro Zanni	Flanker	31 January 1984 (aged 31)	90	(Italy) Benetton Treviso
Sergio Parisse (c)	Number 8	12 September 1983 (aged 32)	113	(France) Stade Français
Edoardo Gori	Scrum-half	5 March 1990 (aged 25)	43	(Italy) Benetton Treviso
Guglielmo Palazzani	Scrum-half	11 April 1991 (aged 24)	11	(Italy) Zebre
Marcello Violi	Scrum-half	11 October 1993 (aged 21)	2	(Italy) Zebre
Tommaso Allan	Fly-half	26 April 1993 (aged 22)	17	(France) Perpignan
Carlo Canna	Fly-half	25 August 1992 (aged 23)	3	(Italy) Zebre
Enrico Bacchin	Centre	28 November 1992 (aged 22)	3	(Italy) Benetton Treviso
Tommaso Benvenuti	Centre	12 December 1990 (aged 24)	31	(England) Bristol
Michele Campagnaro	Centre	13 March 1993 (aged 22)	14	(England) Exeter Chiefs
Gonzalo García	Centre	18 February 1984 (aged 31)	37	(Italy) Zebre
Leonardo Sarto	Wing	15 January 1992 (aged 23)	19	(Italy) Zebre
Giovanbattista Venditti	Wing	27 March 1990 (aged 25)	29	(England) Newcastle Falcons
Michele Visentin ^{1}	Wing	13 December 1991 (aged 23)	1	(Italy) Zebre
Andrea Masi ^{1}	Fullback	30 March 1981 (aged 34)	94	(England) Wasps
Luke McLean	Fullback	29 June 1987 (aged 28)	71	(Italy) Benetton Treviso

=== Romania ===
On 25 August, Romania announced their 31-man squad.

^{1} On 29 September, Vlad Nistor was called up to the squad to replace Ovidiu Tonita, injured during Romania's game with Ireland.

Head coach: (Romania) Lynn Howells

Player	Position	Date of birth (age)	Caps	Club/province
Eugen Căpățână	Hooker	18 June 1986 (aged 29)	18	(Romania) Timișoara Saracens
Andrei Rădoi	Hooker	21 April 1987 (aged 28)	46	(Romania) Timișoara Saracens
Otar Turashvili	Hooker	14 July 1986 (aged 29)	21	(France) Colomiers
Mihai Lazăr	Prop	3 November 1986 (aged 28)	47	(France) Castres
Paulică Ion	Prop	10 January 1983 (aged 32)	70	(France) Perpignan
Horațiu Pungea	Prop	18 February 1986 (aged 29)	26	(France) Oyonnax
Alexandru Țăruș	Prop	9 May 1989 (aged 26)	7	(Romania) Timișoara Saracens
Andrei Ursache	Prop	10 May 1984 (aged 31)	22	(France) Carcassonne
Marius Antonescu	Lock	9 August 1992 (aged 23)	9	(France) Tarbes
Valentin Popârlan	Lock	12 June 1987 (aged 28)	47	(Romania) Timișoara Saracens
Valentin Ursache	Lock	12 August 1985 (aged 30)	60	(France) Oyonnax
Johan van Heerden	Lock	12 September 1986 (aged 29)	1	(Romania) Baia Mare
Stelian Burcea	Flanker	7 October 1983 (aged 31)	50	(Romania) Timișoara Saracens
Viorel Lucaci	Flanker	30 March 1986 (aged 29)	42	(Romania) Steaua București
Mihai Macovei (c)	Flanker	29 October 1986 (aged 28)	64	(France) Colomiers
Daniel Carpo	Number 8	26 November 1984 (aged 30)	51	(Romania) Steaua București
Ovidiu Tonița ^{1}	Number 8	6 July 1980 (aged 35)	70	(France) Provence
Vlad Nistor ^{1}	Number 8	26 March 1994 (aged 21)	14	(France) Castres
Tudorel Bratu	Scrum-half	23 April 1991 (aged 24)	0	(Romania) Dinamo
Valentin Calafeteanu	Scrum-half	25 January 1985 (aged 30)	73	(Romania) Timișoara Saracens
Florin Surugiu	Scrum-half	10 December 1984 (aged 30)	51	(Romania) Steaua București
Dănuț Dumbravă	Fly-half	6 August 1981 (aged 34)	72	(Romania) Steaua București
Michael Wiringi	Fly-half	1 August 1985 (aged 30)	1	(Romania) Baia Mare
Csaba Gál	Centre	7 March 1985 (aged 30)	84	(Romania) Cluj
Paula Kinikinilau	Centre	30 August 1986 (aged 29)	1	(Romania) Timișoara Saracens
Florin Vlaicu	Centre	26 July 1986 (aged 29)	81	(Romania) Steaua București
Adrian Apostol	Wing	11 March 1990 (aged 25)	19	(Romania) Baia Mare
Ionuț Botezatu	Wing	5 May 1987 (aged 28)	27	(Romania) Baia Mare
Florin Ioniță	Wing	5 April 1990 (aged 25)	17	(Romania) Steaua București
Mădălin Lemnaru	Wing	26 March 1989 (aged 26)	27	(Romania) Timișoara Saracens
Cătălin Fercu	Fullback	5 September 1986 (aged 29)	80	(England) Saracens
Sabin Strătilă	Fullback	27 March 1995 (aged 20)	1	(Romania) Steaua București

== Player statistics ==
All statistics are to the original 31-man squad as of 18 September 2015. Statistics do not include players who joined a squad during the tournament.

=== Player representation by club ===
Players	Clubs
21	(Scotland) Glasgow Warriors, (Argentina) UAR
17	(Ireland) Leinster
16	(England) Saracens
14	(France) Toulon
13	(Australia) New South Wales Waratahs
12	(England) Bath
11	(France) Clermont, (Wales) Ospreys, (France) Racing
10	(New Zealand) Crusaders, (New Zealand) Hurricanes
9	(Australia) Brumbies, (England) Newcastle Falcons, (France) Stade Français, (Romania) Timișoara Saracens, (Italy) Zebre
8	(Italy) Benetton Treviso, (Wales) Cardiff Blues, (Scotland) Edinburgh (England) Leicester Tigers, (England) Northampton Saints, (Ireland) Ulster

=== Player representation by league ===
League		Players	Percent	Outside national squad
Total		620	—	—
Canada		18	2.9%	—
England		103	16.6%	72
France		121	19.5%	90
(Georgia (country)) Georgia		11	1.8%	—
Japan		33	5.3%	5
Namibia		11	1.8%	—
Romania		26	4.2%	5
United States		19	3.1%	—
Uruguay		26	4.2%	—
Pro12	Ireland	32	5.2%	2
Pro12	Italy	17	2.7%	1
Pro12	Scotland	29	4.7%	5
Pro12	Wales	28	4.5%	7
Super Rugby	Argentina	21	3.4%	—
Super Rugby	Australia	33	5.3%	4
Super Rugby	New Zealand	36	5.8%	5
Super Rugby	South Africa	22	3.6%	3
Other		21	3.4%	15
Unattached		13	2.1%	—

=== Average age of squads ===
Nation	Avg. Age	Oldest player	Youngest player
Argentina	27	Juan Martín Fernández Lobbe (33 years, 303 days)	Guido Petti (20 years, 305 days)
Australia	27	Wycliff Palu (33 years, 53 days)	Sean McMahon (21 years, 92 days)
Canada	28	Jamie Cudmore (37 years, 353 days)	Djustice Sears-Duru (21 years, 117 days)
England	26	Richard Wigglesworth (32 years, 101 days)	Anthony Watson (21 years, 204 days)
Fiji	29	Sunia Koto (35 years, 156 days)	Peceli Yato (22 years, 244 days)
France	28	Nicolas Mas (35 years, 118 days)	Gaël Fickou (21 years, 176 days)
Georgia	26	Giorgi Chkhaidze (33 years, 56 days)	Vasil Lobzhanidze (18 years, 339 days)
Ireland	28	Paul O'Connell (35 years, 333 days)	Robbie Henshaw (22 years, 98 days)
Italy	28	Mauro Bergamasco (36 years, 140 days)	Marcello Violi (21 years, 342 days)
Japan	29	Hitoshi Ono (37 years, 135 days)	Yoshikazu Fujita (21 years, 345 days)
Namibia	26	Jaco Engels (34 years, 275 days)	Damian Stevens (20 years, 108 days)
New Zealand	28	Keven Mealamu (36 years, 182 days)	Malakai Fekitoa (23 years, 131 days)
Romania	29	Ovidiu Tonița (35 years, 74 days)	Sabin Strătilă (20 years, 175 days)
Samoa	29	Maurie Fa'asavalu (35 years, 249 days)	Vavao Afemai (23 years, 212 days)
Scotland	27	Sean Lamont (34 years, 246 days)	Jonny Gray (21 years, 188 days)
South Africa	28	Victor Matfield (38 years, 130 days)	Handré Pollard (21 years, 193 days)
Tonga	30	Aleki Lutui (37 years, 79 days)	Latiume Fosita (23 years, 55 days)
United States	27	Matekitonga Moeakiola (37 years, 125 days)	Titi Lamositele (20 years, 219 days)
Uruguay	26	Francisco Bulanti (35 years, 159 days)	Germán Kessler (21 years, 79 days)
Wales	26	Gethin Jenkins (34 years, 305 days)	Hallam Amos (20 years, 359 days)

=== Squad caps ===
Nation	Caps	Most capped player	Least capped player
New Zealand	1484	Richie McCaw (142)	Waisake Naholo (1)
South Africa	1297	Victor Matfield (123)	Rudy Paige (0)
Australia	1263	Adam Ashley-Cooper (108)	Toby Smith (1)
Romania	1185	Csaba Gál (84)	Tudorel Bratu (0)
Italy	1181	Martin Castrogiovanni (113); Sergio Parisse (113)	Marcello Violi (2)
Georgia	1148	Giorgi Chkhaidze (85)	Giorgi Pruidze (4)
Ireland	1066	Paul O'Connell (104)	Tadhg Furlong (2)
Wales	1051	Gethin Jenkins (116)	Dominic Day (1); Tomas Francis (1); Ross Moriarty (1)
Japan	1016	Hitoshi Ono (94)	Amanaki Mafi (3)
France	1002	Dimitri Szarzewski (81)	Alexandre Dumoulin (4); Sofiane Guitoune (4); Noa Nakaitaci (4)
Argentina	871	Juan Martín Fernández Lobbe (64)	Juan Pablo Socino (2)
Uruguay	866	Diego Magno (48)	Matías Beer (9)
England	784	James Haskell (60)	Henry Slade (1)
Scotland	713	Sean Lamont (97)	Josh Strauss (0)
Canada	692	Aaron Carpenter (67)	Evan Olmstead (5)
Fiji	619	Akapusi Qera (47)	Lee Roy Atalifo (2)
United States	567	Louis Stanfill (55)	Joe Taufete'e (0)
Tonga	527	Nili Latu (40)	Sosefo Maʻake (1)
Namibia	505	Johnny Redelinghuys (47)	Wian Conradie (1); Damian Stevens (1)
Samoa	505	Census Johnston (48)	Tim Nanai-Williams (1)

=== Previous World Cup experience ===
==== By tournaments ====
Player	World Cups
(Italy) Mauro Bergamasco	4
(South Africa) Schalk Burger	3
(New Zealand) Dan Carter	3
(Italy) Martin Castrogiovanni	3
(Georgia (country)) Giorgi Chkhaidze	3
(Canada) Jamie Cudmore	3
(Romania) Dănuț Dumbravă	3
(Samoa) Maurie Fa'asavalu	3
(Wales) Gethin Jenkins	3
(Georgia (country)) Merab Kvirikashvili	3
(Italy) Andrea Masi	3
(South Africa) Victor Matfield	3
(New Zealand) Richie McCaw	3
(New Zealand) Keven Mealamu	3
(Ireland) Paul O'Connell	3
(Italy) Sergio Parisse	3
(Romania) Paulică Ion	3
(Romania) Ovidiu Tonița	3
(New Zealand) Tony Woodcock	3
62 Players	2
158 Players	1
380 Players	0

==== By matches ====
Player	RWC matches
(New Zealand) Richie McCaw	16
(Wales) Gethin Jenkins	15
(South Africa) Victor Matfield	14
(New Zealand) Keven Mealamu	14
(South Africa) Schalk Burger	13
(Ireland) Paul O'Connell	13
(Italy) Martin Castrogiovanni	12
(Georgia (country)) Merab Kvirikashvili	12
(France) Frédéric Michalak	12
(Italy) Sergio Parisse	12
(France) Dimitri Szarzewski	12
(Romania) Ovidiu Tonița	12
(Argentina) Horacio Agulla	11
(Australia) Adam Ashley-Cooper	11
(Italy) Mauro Bergamasco	11
(Georgia (country)) Giorgi Chkhaidze	11
(France) Thierry Dusautoir	11
(South Africa) Bryan Habana	11
(Argentina) Juan Manuel Leguizamón	11
(Italy) Andrea Masi	11
(South Africa) JP Pietersen	11
(South Africa) Fourie du Preez	11
(New Zealand) Tony Woodcock	11
(Wales) Alun Wyn Jones	11
