= Vlad Nistor =

Vlad Nistor may refer to:

- Vlad Nistor (rugby union) (born 1994), Romanian rugby union player
- Vlad Nistor (politician), Romanian politician
