= Ricardo Le Fort =

Argentine rugby union player (born 1965)

- Born: Ricardo Agusto Le Fort; October 13, 1965 (age 61) San Miguel de Tucumán

Rugby union career
- Position: Hooker
Senior career
Years	Team	Apps	(Points)
198?-199?	Tucumán Rugby Club		
International career
Years	Team	Apps	(Points)
1990-1995	Argentina	16	(5)

Ricardo Agusto Le Fort (born 13 October 1965 in San Miguel de Tucumán) is a former Argentine rugby union player. He played as a hooker.

Le Fort played is entire career for Tucumán Rugby Club in the Nacional de Clubes of Argentina.

He had 6 caps for Argentina, from 1990 to 1995, scoring 1 try, 5 points on aggregate. He was called for the 1991 Rugby World Cup, playing in two games and remaining scoreless, and for the 1995 Rugby World Cup, but this time he didn't leave the bench.

He is the head coach of Argentina Jaguars.

He is the current head coach of the Paraguay National Team
