= Tomás Carrió =

Argentine rugby union player (born 1989)

- Born: 10 March 1989 (age 37) Chaco Province, Argentina
- Height: 5 ft 11 in (180 cm)
- Weight: 185 lb (84 kg)

Rugby union career
- Position: Utility back
Senior career
| Years | Team | Apps | (Points) |
| 2014–2016 | Duendes | 5 | (20) |
| 2015 | Pampas XV | 5 | (20) |
| 2017 | Rangers Vicenza | 6 | (53) |
| 2017–2018 | Valladolid | 22 | (121) |
| 2019–2020 | Aparejadores | 9 | (69) |
| 2020–2021 | Valladolid | 16 | (73) |
| 2021–2024 | Aparejadores | 46 | (352) |
| 2022–2023 | Castilla y León Iberians | | |
| 2024–2025 | Rangers Vicenza | | |
International career
| Years | Team | Apps | (Points) |
| 2013–2015 | Argentina XV | 6 | (15) |
Coaching career
- Years: Team
- 2025-: Real Ciencias RC

Tomás Carrió (born 10 March 1989) is an Argentine former international rugby union player and coach who coaches Real Ciencias RC of the Division de Honor de Rugby.

A utility back from Chaco Province, Carrió played with Rosario-based club Duendes from 2008 to 2015, during which time he earned six Pumas caps as a wing and fullback, scoring three international tries.

Carrió left Argentine rugby in 2017 to play professional rugby in Europe. He had one season with Italian club Rangers Vicenza and then competed in Spain until 2024. Used as a goal-kicking fly-half, Carrió spent the most seasons with Aparejadores, which he captained in multiple campaigns. He won the Copa del Rey in his final season at Aparejadores.

== See also ==
- List of Argentina national rugby union players
