= Santiago García Botta =

Argentine rugby union player (born 1992)

- Full name: Santiago García Botta
- Born: 19 June 1992 (age 34) Buenos Aires, Argentina
- Height: 183 cm (6 ft 0 in)
- Weight: 110 kg (243 lb; 17 st 5 lb)

Rugby union career
- Position: Loosehead Prop
- Current team: Harlequins
Senior career
Years	Team	Apps	(Points)
2011-2014	Belgrano	57	(20)
2014-2015	Stade Français Paris	3	(0)
2015	Pampas XV	5	(0)
2016-2019	Jaguares	44	(5)
2019-	Harlequins	69	(0)
2011-	Total	178	(25)
- Correct as of 10 December 2023
International career
Years	Team	Apps	(Points)
2012	Argentina under-20	-	(-)
2013-2018	Argentina	34	(5)
- Correct as of 10 December 2023

Santiago García Botta (born 19 June 1992 in Buenos Aires) is an Argentine rugby union player. He plays as a prop.

== Career ==
He played at Belgrano Athletic Club at the Nacional de Clubes. He moved to Stade Français, returning afterwards to Argentina to play for the Pampas XV.

García Botta was a regular player for Argentina Jaguars. He played at the 2015 World Rugby Nations Cup, where the Jaguars were runners-up. He won 34 caps for Argentina, with one try scored, over a five-year international career. His first game was at the 85–10 win over Chile, at 1 May 2013, in Montevideo, for the 2015 Rugby World Cup qualifyings. He scored a try in his international debut.

He was a late call up for the Pumas in the 2015 Rugby World Cup, haven been called up on 29 October the day before the Bronze final against South Africa. He came on during the 77th minute of the game.

In 2019 he joined English club Harlequins. He was a replacement in the Premiership final against Exeter on 26 June 2021 as Harlequins won the game 40–38 in the highest scoring Premiership final ever.
