= Vlad Bădălicescu =

Romania international rugby union player

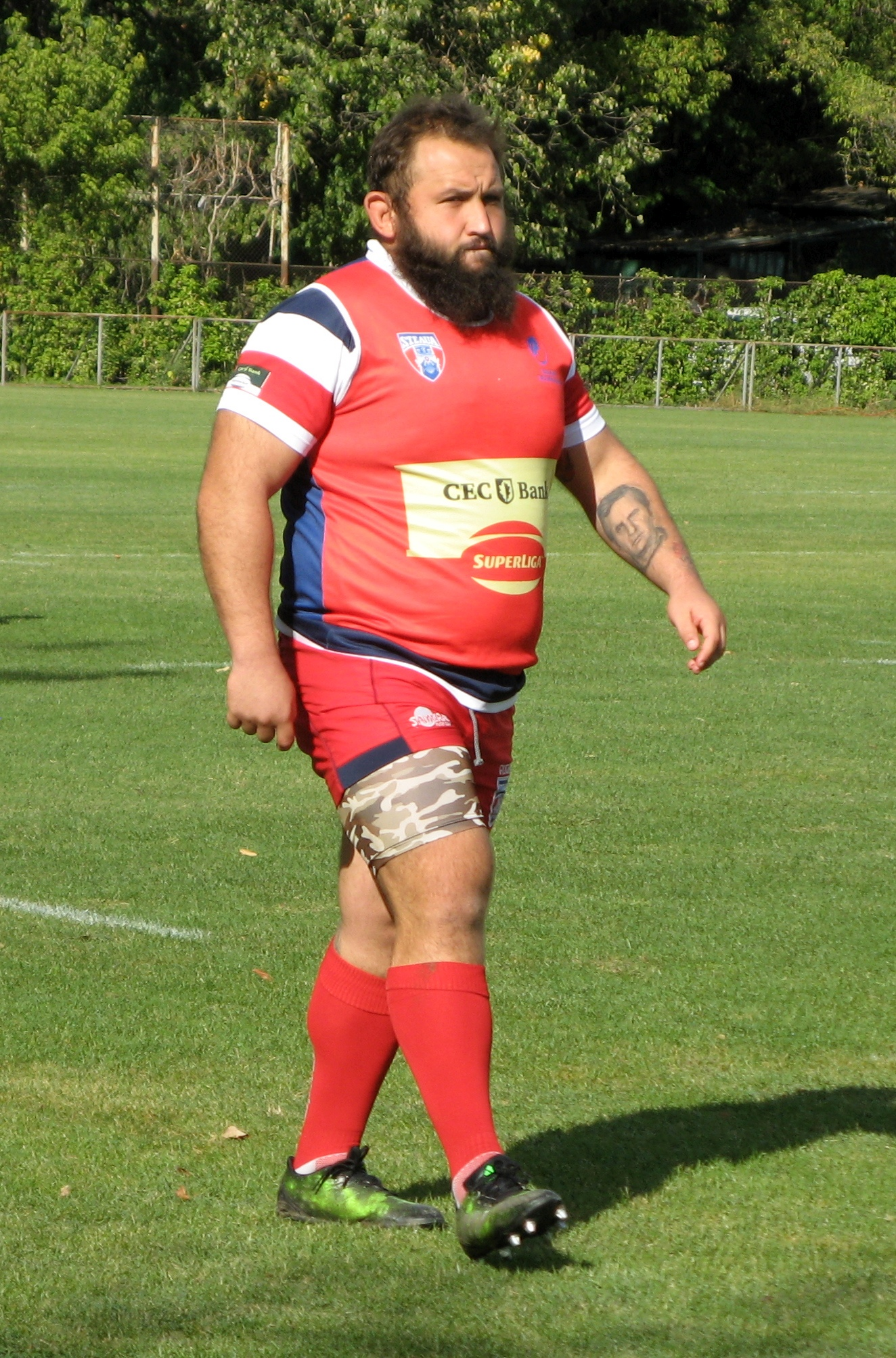
- Vlad Bădălicescu training with Steaua in 2017
- Full name: Vlad-Cornel Bădălicescu
- Born: 4 August 1988 (age 38) Bucharest, Romania
- Height: 1.78 m (5 ft 10 in)
- Weight: 113 kg (17 st 11 lb; 249 lb)

Rugby union career
- Position: Prop
- Current team: Steaua București
Senior career
Years	Team	Apps	(Points)
2010–15	Bucharest Wolves	22	(0)
2013	Dinamo București	3	(0)
2014	Farul Constanța	15	(0)
2015	Olipmia București	7	(0)
2015–16	L'Aquila	16	(0)
2016–	Steaua București	16	(10)
- Correct as of 15 April 2017
International career
Years	Team	Apps	(Points)
2012–	Romania	7	(0)
- Correct as of 15 April 2017

Vlad-Cornel Bădălicescu (born 4 August 1988 in Bucharest) is a Romanian rugby union football player. He plays as a prop for professional SuperLiga club Steaua București. He also plays for Romania's national team, the Oaks, making his international debut at the 2010–12 European Nations Cup in a match against the Os Lobos.

== Career ==
During his career Vlad Bădălicescu also played for Dinamo București, Farul Constanța, Olipmia București, Bucharest Wolves and L'Aquila Rugby.
