= Marian Drenceanu =

Romanian rugby union footballer

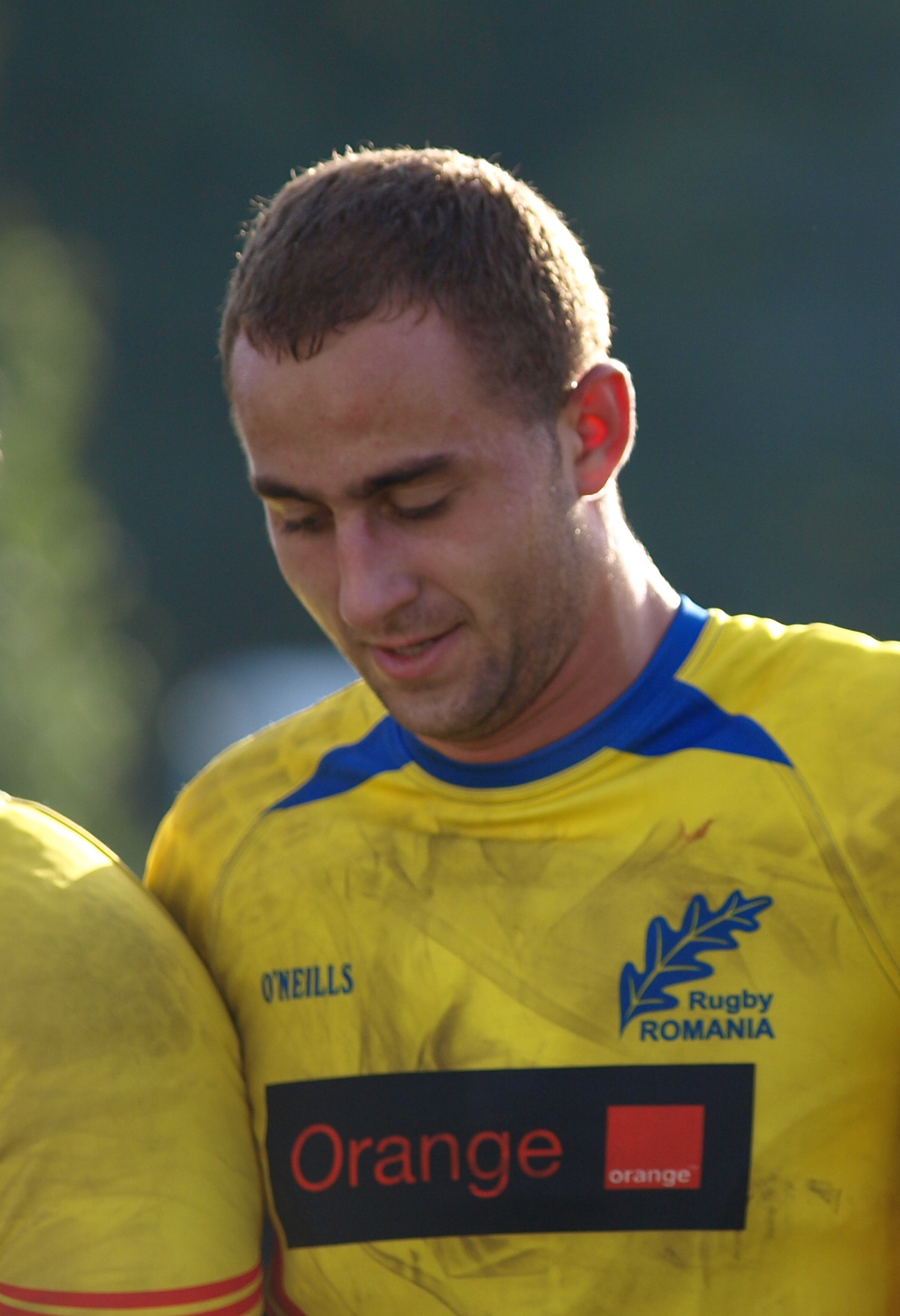
- Marian Drenceanu in 2008 with Romania U-19 National Rugby Union Team
- Born: Marian Drenceanu; 1 March 1990 (age 36) Iași, Romania
- Height: 6 ft 7 in (2.01 m)
- Weight: 19 st 5 lb (271 lb; 123 kg)

Rugby union career
- Position: Lock
- Current team: CSM București
Youth career
- CSS Unirea Iași
Amateur team(s)
Years	Team	Apps	(Points)
- UAV Arad
Senior career
Years	Team	Apps	(Points)
2012–18	Timișoara Saracens	41	(25)
2018–19	CSM București	3	(0)
2019–present	Steaua București	3	(0)
Provincial / State sides
Years	Team	Apps	(Points)
2010–14	București Wolves	13	(0)
- Correct as of 18 September 2019
International career
Years	Team	Apps	(Points)
2014–present	Romania	6	(0)
- Correct as of 18 September 2019

Marian Drenceanu (born 1 March 1990) is a Romanian rugby union footballer. He plays the position of lock.

== Club career ==
He played for Timișoara Saracens between 2012 and 2018. At the start of 2019 he transferred to CSM București, in the SuperLiga. Following CSM's dissolution in 2019 he chose to represent Steaua București.

== International career ==
Drenceanu has six caps for Romania. He won his first cap in 2014 against Russian Medvedi.
