= Lucas Maguire =

Argentine rugby union player (born 1991)

- Born: 26 January 1991 (age 35) Buenos Aires, Argentina
- Height: 6 ft 1 in (185 cm)
- Weight: 216 lb (98 kg)

Rugby union career
- Position: Back-row
International career
Years	Team	Apps	(Points)
2014–16	Argentina	3	(0)

Lucas Maguire (born 26 January 1991) is an Argentine rugby union player.

Born in Buenos Aires, Maguire started out as a centre and winger, but later began filling back row positions at hometown club CUBA, where he has spent his entire career after debuting in the 2011 season. He played in the 2013 and 2021 Torneo de la URBA-winning sides, as well as the club's 2014 Nacional de Clubes tournament win.

Maguire gained three Test caps for Argentina from 2014 to 2016, playing as a flanker and number eight, for two matches against Chile and one against Uruguay. He was in the Argentina XV team at the 2016 World Rugby Nations Cup in Bucharest and became the first player to score a six-point try in a northern hemisphere international.

== See also ==
- List of Argentina national rugby union players
