= Aníbal Panceyra Garrido =

Argentine rugby union player

Aníbal Panceyra
- Born: Aníbal Panceyra Garrido; 23 October 1988 (age 38) Argentina
- Height: 1.95 m (6 ft 5 in)
- Weight: 92 kg (203 lb; 14 st 7 lb)

Rugby union career
- Position: Lock / Flanker / Number 8
Senior career
Years	Team	Apps	(Points)
2015–2017	Tala	19	(15)
2015	Pampas XV	1	(0)
2021–	Cafeteros Pro	0	(0)
- Correct as of 19 February 2021
International career
Years	Team	Apps	(Points)
2007	Argentina U20s	4	(0)
2015	Argentina XV	4	(10)
- Correct as of 19 February 2021
National sevens team
Years	Team		Comps
2012–2014	Argentina Sevens		11
- Correct as of 19 February 2021

Aníbal Panceyra Garrido (Note: In this Spanish name, the first or paternal surname is Panceyra and the second or maternal family name is Garrido.) (born 23 October 1988) is an Argentine rugby union player, currently playing for Súper Liga Americana de Rugby side Cafeteros Pro. His preferred position is lock, flanker or number 8.

== Professional career ==
Panceyra Garrido signed for Súper Liga Americana de Rugby side Cafeteros Pro ahead of the 2021 Súper Liga Americana de Rugby season. He had previously represented the Argentina Sevens side at 11 competitions between 2012 and 2014, including at the 2013 Rugby World Cup Sevens. He also represented Pampas XV and the Argentina XV.
