= Tomás Baravalle =

Argentine rugby union player

- Born: 24 December 1990 (age 35) Rosario
- Height: 1.82 m (6 ft 0 in)
- Weight: 101 kg (15 st 13 lb; 223 lb)

Rugby union career
- Position: Hooker
- Current team: Dallas Jackals
Youth career
- Jockey Club
Senior career
| Years | Team | Apps | (Points) |
| 2010−2012 | Jockey Club | | |
| 2012−2014 | San Gregorio Catania | | |
| 2014 | Pakuranga United | | |
| 2014−2017 | Jockey Club | 5 | (0) |
| 2017−2022 | Benetton | 61 | (40) |
| 2023− | Dallas Jackals | | |
- Correct as of 19 March 2023
International career
| Years | Team | Apps | (Points) |
| 2010 | Argentina Under 20 | 5 | (5) |
| 2014−2015 | Argentina XV | 6 | (0) |
- Correct as of 16 May 2020

Tomás Baravalle (born 24 December 1990) is an Argentine rugby union player. Born and raised in Rosario, he currently plays for American team Dallas Jackals in Major League Rugby (MLR). His usual position is as at Hooker.

He played for Italian team Benetton in Pro14 and United Rugby Championship from 2018 to 2022.

After playing for Argentina Under 20 in 2010, from 2014 to 2015 Baravalle was named in the Argentina XV.
