= Casper Viviers =

Namibia international rugby union player

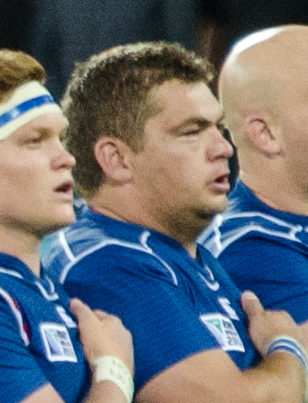
- Full name: Casper Wilfried Viviers
- Born: 1 June 1988 (age 38) Windhoek, South West Africa
- Height: 1.85 m (6 ft 1 in)
- Weight: 120 kg (18 st 13 lb; 265 lb)

Rugby union career
- Position: Prop
- Current team: Welwitschias
Youth career
- 2005: Namibia Under-18
Senior career
Years	Team	Apps	(Points)
2010–2011	Cahors	13	(0)
2011–2013	Saint-Junien	29	(5)
2013–2015	Saint Nazaire	27	(5)
2015	Welwitschias	2	(0)
2015–2017	Bobigny	21	(5)
2016	→ Welwitschias	4	(0)
2018–present	Welwitschias	2	(0)
- Correct as of 22 July 2018
International career
Years	Team	Apps	(Points)
2010–present	Namibia	35	(5)
- Correct as of 16 November 2018

Casper Wilfried Viviers (born 1 June 1988) is a rugby union player for the Namibia national team and the Welwitschias in the Currie Cup and the Rugby Challenge. He was named in Namibia's squad for the 2015 Rugby World Cup.
