= Otar Turashvili =

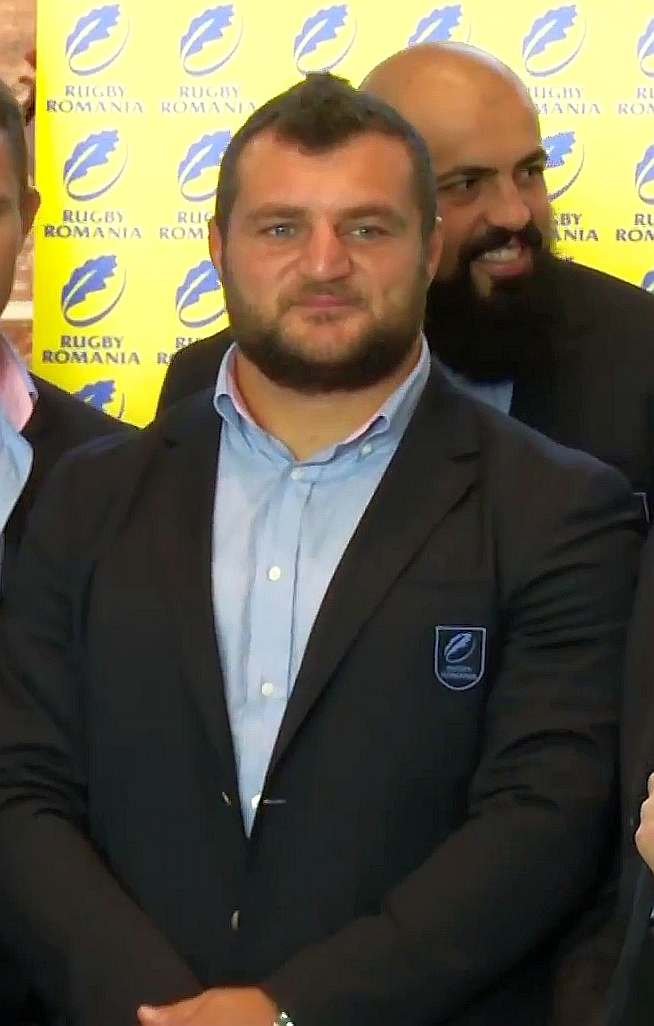
- Otar Turashvili during a press conference before departing for 2015 Rugby World Cup
- Born: 14 July 1986 (age 40) Tbilisi, Georgia
- Height: 1.84 m (6 ft 0 in)
- Weight: 118 kg (260 lb)

Rugby union career
- Position(s): Hooker; Prop
Senior career
Years	Team	Apps	(Points)
2012–15	București Wolves	12	(5)
2015–	Colomiers	36	(5)
- Correct as of 11 June 2016
Provincial / State sides
Years	Team	Apps	(Points)
2012	Timișoara Saracens	1	(0)
2013–14	Farul Constanța	17	(5)
2015	Olimpia București	6	(0)
- Correct as of 11 June 2016
International career
Years	Team	Apps	(Points)
2012–	Romania	35	(17)
- Correct as of 19 June 2017

Otar Turashvili (Georgian: ოთარ ტურაშვილი; born 14 July 1986) is a Georgian-born Romanian rugby union player. He plays primarily as a hooker and occasionally as a prop for professional SuperLiga club București and București-based European Challenge Cup side the Wolves. Turashvili also plays for Romania's national team the Oaks.
