= Eneill Buitendag =

Namibian rugby union player

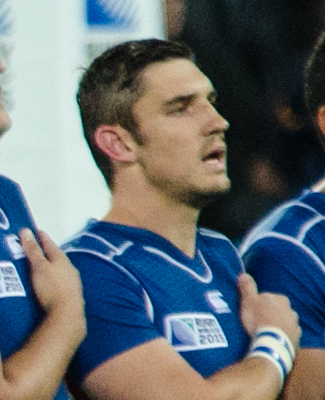
- Born: 21 June 1989 (age 37) Windhoek, South West Africa
- Height: 1.86 m (6 ft 1 in)
- Weight: 94 kg (207 lb; 14 st 11 lb)
- School: Windhoek High School
- University: University of Stellenbosch

Rugby union career
- Position: Scrum-half
Youth career
- 2008: Western Province
Senior career
| Years | Team | Apps | (Points) |
| 2015 | Welwitschias | 7 | (0) |
- Correct as of 22 July 2018
International career
| Years | Team | Apps | (Points) |
| 2010–2015 | Namibia | 15 | (5) |
- Correct as of 22 July 2018

Eneill Buitendag (born 21 June 1989) is a Namibian rugby union player. He was named in Namibia's squad for the 2015 Rugby World Cup.
