= Conrad Marais =

Namibian rugby union player

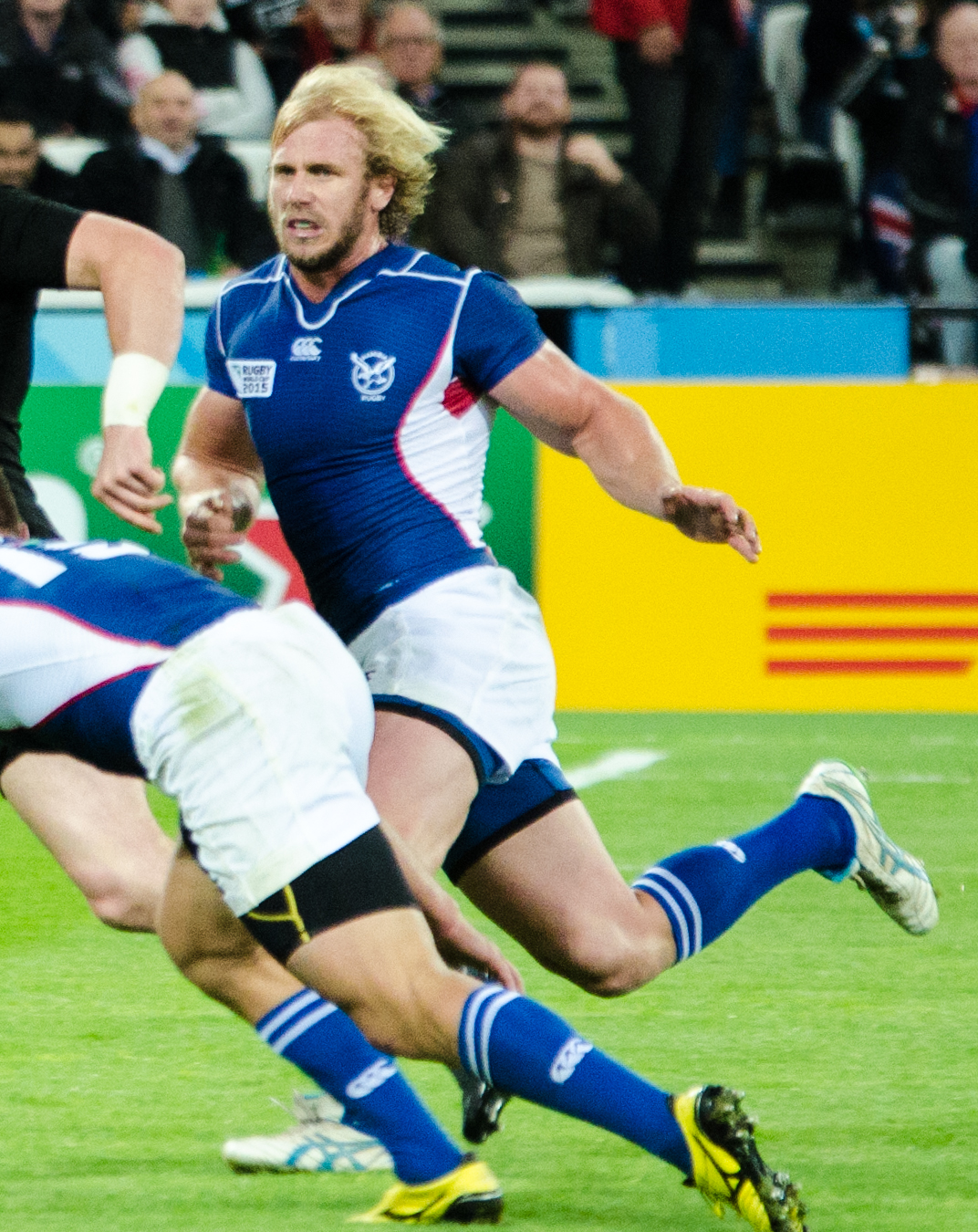
- Conrad Marais at the 2015 Rugby World Cup
- Born: 26 April 1989 (age 37)
- Height: 1.93 m (6 ft 4 in)
- Weight: 103 kg (227 lb; 16 st 3 lb)

Rugby union career
- Position: Wing
International career
Years	Team	Apps	(Points)
2010–present	Namibia	10	(25)
- Correct as of 11 October 2015

Conrad Marais (born 26 April 1989) is a Namibian rugby union player. He was named in Namibia's squad for the 2015 Rugby World Cup.
