= Florin Ioniță =

Romania international rugby union player

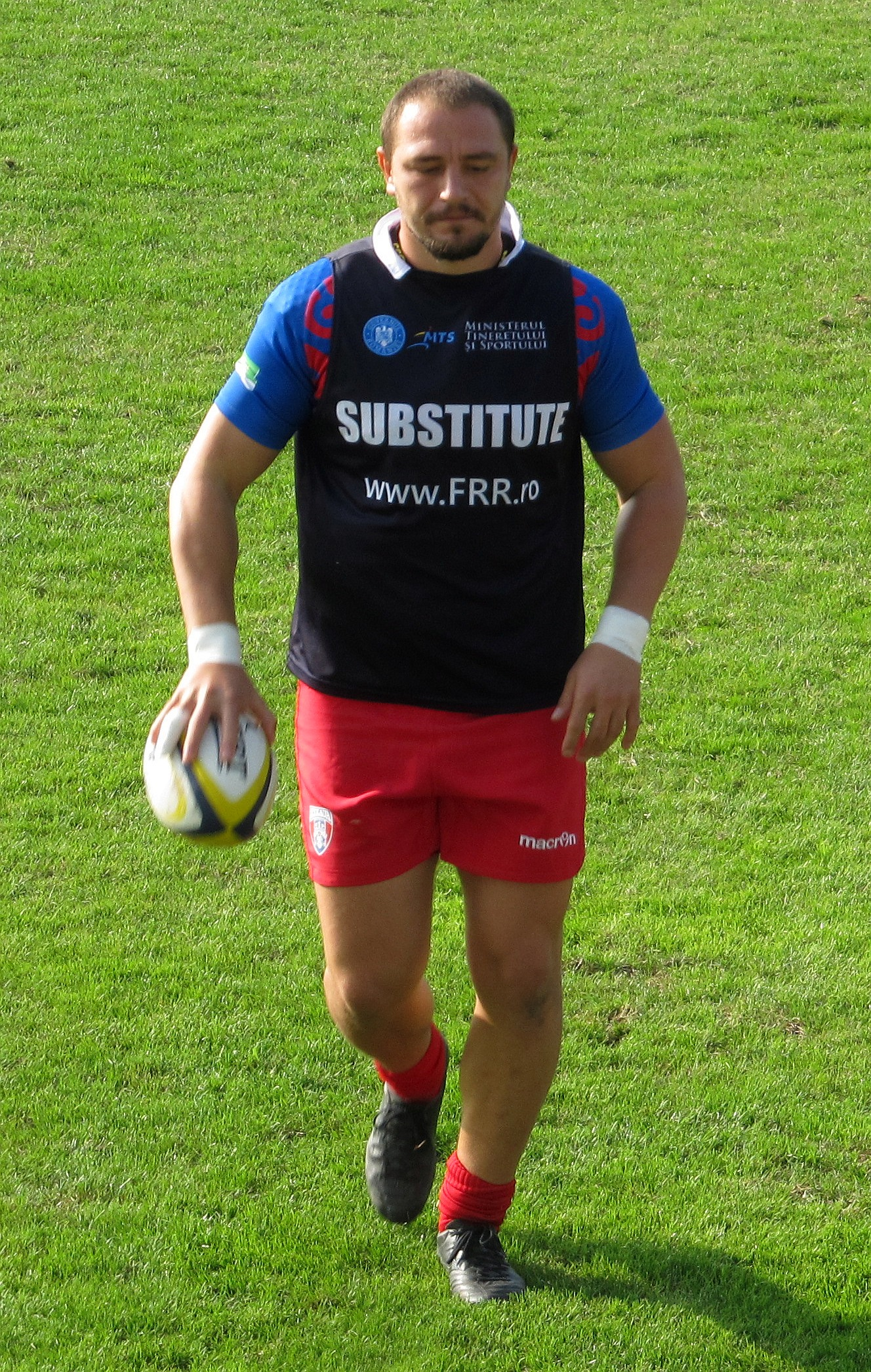
- Florin Ioniță training for Steaua during a match half-time in 2019
- Born: Florin Claudiu Ioniță; 5 April 1990 (age 36) Bucharest, Romania
- Height: 1.95 m (6 ft 5 in)
- Weight: 96 kg (212 lb)

Rugby union career
- Position(s): Centre, Wing
Senior career
Years	Team	Apps	(Points)
2012–15	București Wolves	7	(5)
- Correct as of 20 September 2015
Provincial / State sides
Years	Team	Apps	(Points)
2013–	Steaua București	28	(30)
- Correct as of 5 December 2015
International career
Years	Team	Apps	(Points)
2013–	Romania	20	(10)
- Correct as of 13 February 2016

Florin Claudiu Ioniță (born 5 April 1990) is a Romanian rugby union player. He plays in the wing and occasionally centre position for professional SuperLiga club Steaua and București based European Challenge Cup side the Wolves. Ioniță also plays for Romania's national team the Oaks.
