= David Philander =

Namibia international rugby union player

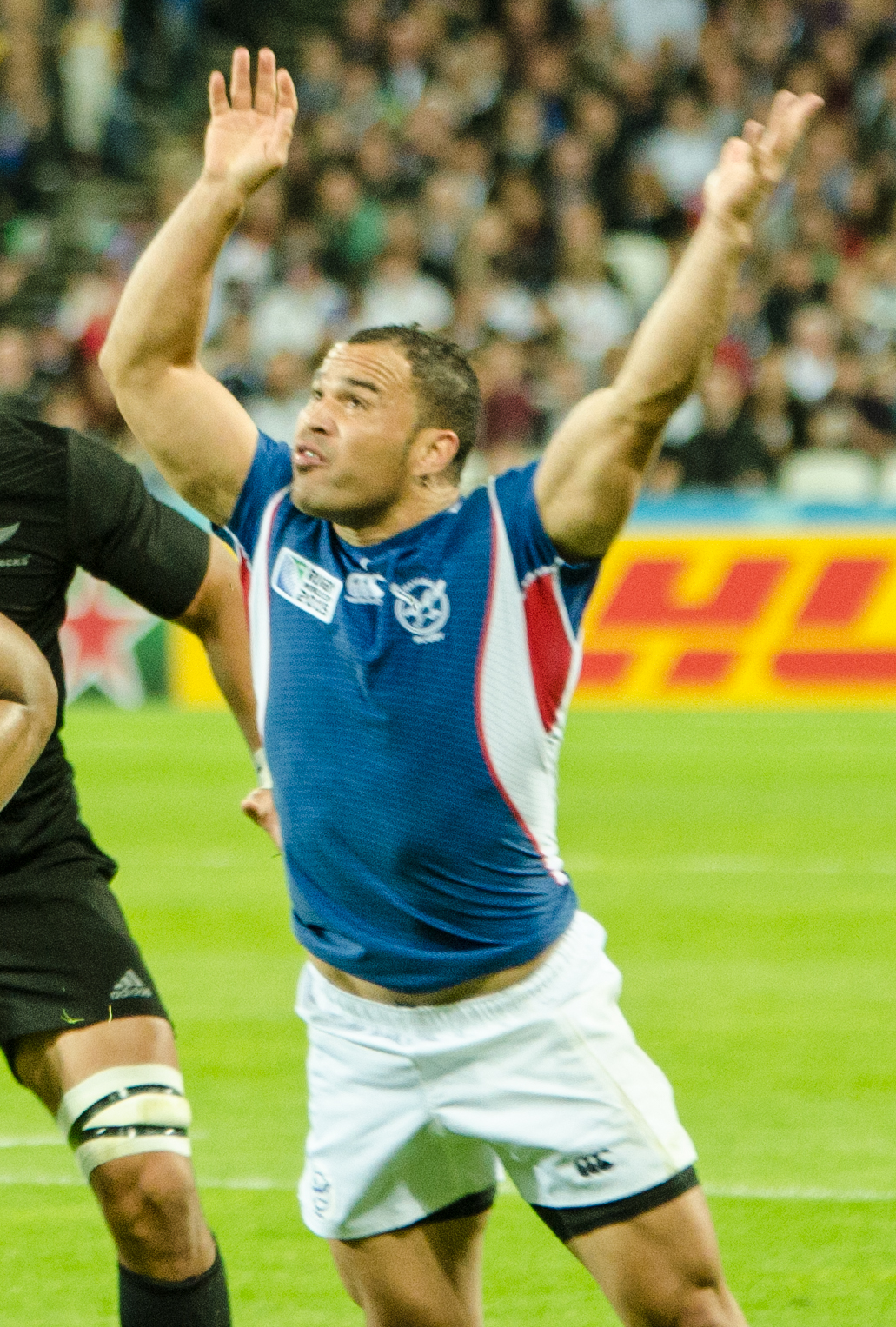
- Full name: David Glen Philander
- Born: 1 April 1987 (age 39) Windhoek, South-West Africa
- Height: 1.75 m (5 ft 9 in)
- Weight: 94 kg (207 lb; 14 st 11 lb)
- School: Dawid Bezuidenhout High School, Windhoek

Rugby union career
- Position: Winger
- Current team: Welwitschias
Youth career
- 2005: Griquas
- 2006–2008: Leopards
Amateur team(s)
Years	Team	Apps	(Points)
- Spotswood United
Senior career
Years	Team	Apps	(Points)
2011	Welwitschias	3	(5)
2017–present	Welwitschias	13	(35)
- Correct as of 5 June 2018
International career
Years	Team	Apps	(Points)
2008–2017	Namibia	30	(50)
- Correct as of 18 November 2017

David Philander (born 4 January 1987) is a rugby union winger who plays for the Welwitschias and the Namibian national rugby union team. Philander made his debut for the Namibia in 2008 and was part of the squad at the 2015 Rugby World Cup.
