= Viorel Lucaci =

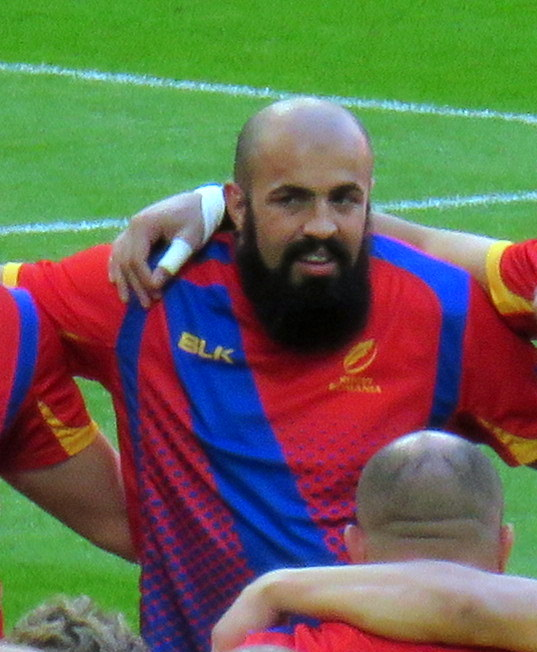
- Born: 29 August 1986 (age 40) Gura Humorului, Romania
- Height: 1.90 m (6 ft 3 in)
- Weight: 103 kg (16 st 3 lb; 227 lb)

Rugby union career
- Position: Flanker
- Correct as of 20 September 2015
Senior career
Years	Team	Apps	(Points)
2007–14	București Wolves	20	(10)
- Correct as of 23 March 2019
Provincial / State sides
Years	Team	Apps	(Points)
2013–21	Steaua București		
- Correct as of 23 March 2019
International career
Years	Team	Apps	(Points)
2009–19	Romania	65	(50)
- Correct as of 23 March 2019

Viorel Lucaci (born 29 August 1986) is a Romanian rugby union player. He plays primarily as a flanker and occasionally as a lock.

He plays for amateur SuperLiga club Steaua and for București based European Challenge Cup side the Wolves.

He has 46 caps for Romania, since 2009, with 6 tries scored, 30 points on aggregate. He was called for the 2015 Rugby World Cup, playing in all the four games but without scoring.
