= Florin Surugiu =

Romania international rugby union player

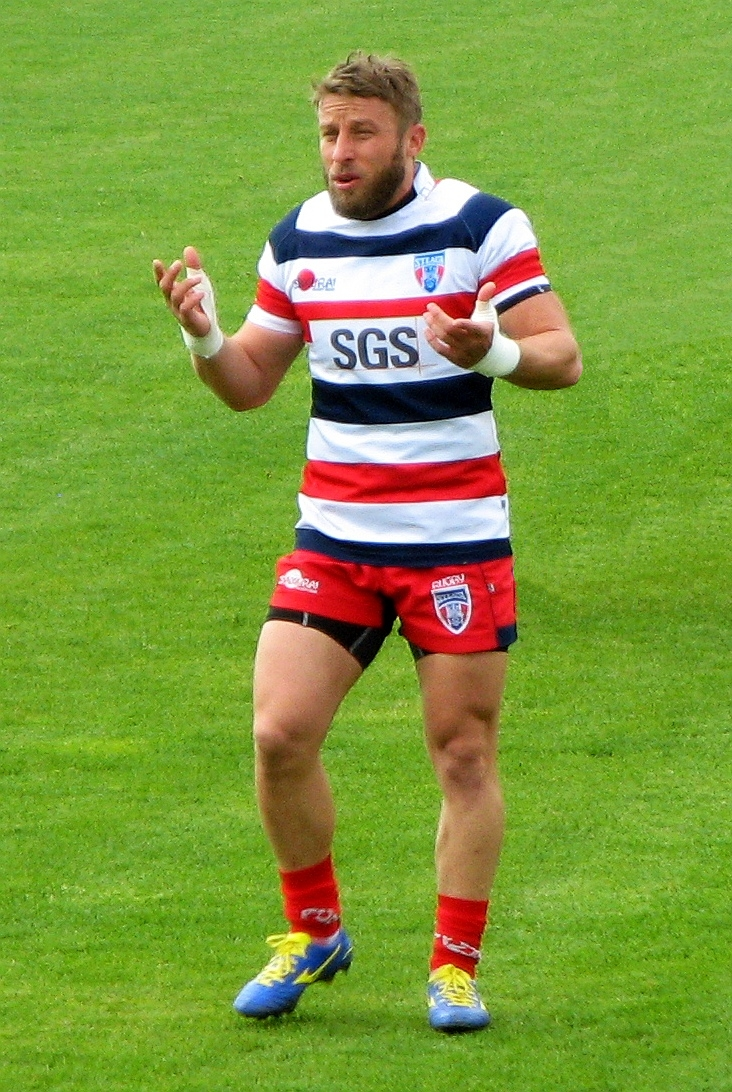
- Florin Surugiu playing for Steaua in 2017
- Born: 10 December 1984 (age 41) Bucharest, Romania
- Height: 1.72 m (5 ft 7 1/2 in)
- Weight: 80 kg (12 st 8 lb; 180 lb)

Rugby union career
- Position: Scrum-half
- Correct as of 25 November 2013
Senior career
Years	Team	Apps	(Points)
2008–2012	Steaua București	18	(25)
2012–	CSM București	23	(5)
2013–15	București Wolves	11	(5)
- Correct as of 27 August 2015
International career
Years	Team	Apps	(Points)
2008–	Romania	101	(25)
- Correct as of 25 November 2017

Florin Surugiu (born 10 December 1984 in Bucharest, Romania) is a Romanian rugby union player. He plays in the scrum-half position for amateur SuperLiga club CSM București and București based European Challenge Cup side the Wolves. Surugiu also plays for Romania's national team the Oaks.

Surugiu made his international debut in 2008 as a substitute against Uruguay. He played for Romania in the IRB Nations Cup and in their 2011 Rugby World Cup qualifying before appearing for them in the 2011 Rugby World Cup. He played three Tests at the World Cup, one as a substitute against Scotland and two in the scrum-half position against Argentina and Georgia.
