= Heinrich Smit (rugby union) =

Namibia international rugby union player

- Born: November 21, 1990 (age 35)
- Height: 1.75 m (5 ft 9 in)
- Weight: 88 kg (13 st 12 lb; 194 lb)
- School: St. Andrew's College

Rugby union career
- Position: Wing
Provincial / State sides
Years	Team	Apps	(Points)
2016–2017	Welwitschias	14	(3)
- Correct as of 5 June 2018
International career
Years	Team	Apps	(Points)
2013–2016	Namibia	18	(25)

Heinrich 'Cooper' Smit (born 21 November 1990) is a rugby union winger who plays for NWU Pukke and Namibia. Smit made his debut for the Namibia in 2013 and was part of the squad at the 2015 Rugby World Cup.
