= Marius Antonescu =

Romanian rugby union player

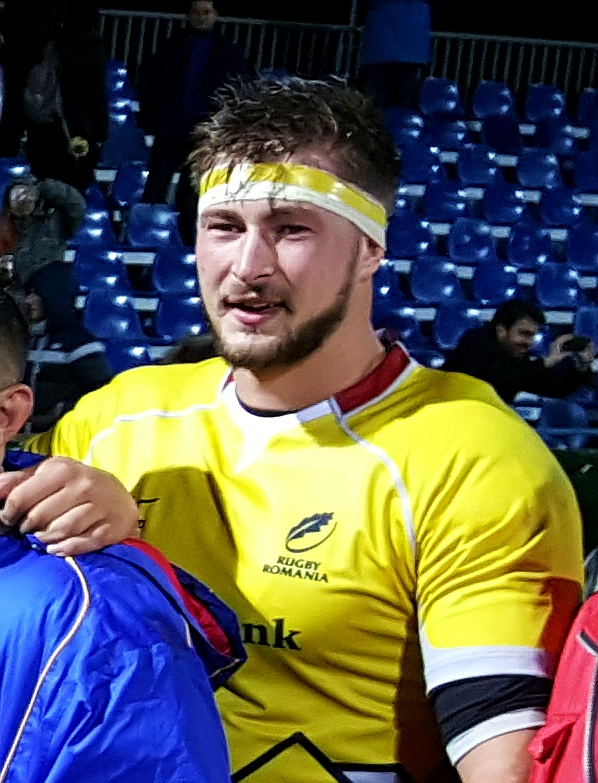
- Marius Antonescu in 2016 after winning the Pershing Trophy against USA
- Born: Marius Constantin Antonescu; 9 August 1992 (age 34) Mangalia, Romania
- Height: 1.97 m (6 ft 5 1/2 in)
- Weight: 109 kg (17 st 2 lb; 240 lb)

Rugby union career
- Position: Lock
Provincial / State sides
Years	Team	Apps	(Points)
2012	Dinamo București	2	(0)
2013–14	Olimpia București	2	(0)
2014–	Tarbes	54	(15)
- Correct as of 8 December 2016
International career
Years	Team	Apps	(Points)
2014–	Romania	28	(0)
- Correct as of 22 November 2017

Marius Constantin Antonescu (born 9 August 1992) is a Romanian rugby union player. He plays as a lock.

He plays for Tarbes in France.

He has 10 caps for Romania, since his debut in 2014, and still has to score his first points. Antonescu was part of the squad at the 2015 Rugby World Cup, playing a single game, as a substitute.
