= Ionuț Botezatu =

Romania international rugby union player

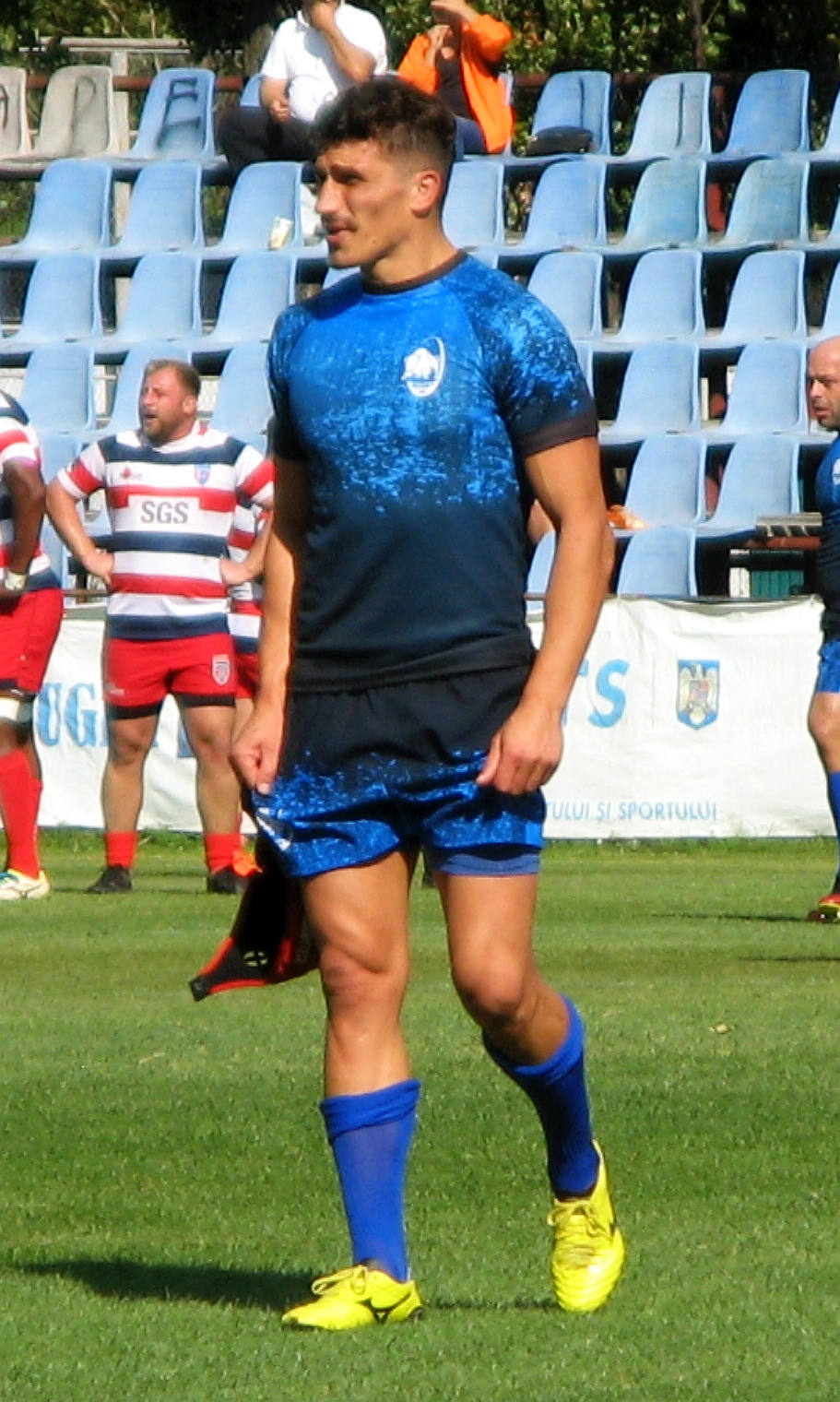
- Ionuț Botezatu playing for CSM Baia Mare during a SuperLiga match in 2017
- Born: Cătălin Ionuț Botezatu; 12 December 1987 (age 38) Pașcani, Romania
- Height: 1.80 m (5 ft 11 in)
- Weight: 80 kg (176 lb)

Rugby union career
- Position(s): Wing, Fullback
- Correct as of 20 September 2015
Senior career
Years	Team	Apps	(Points)
2009–15	București Wolves	20	(35)
- Correct as of 20 September 2015
Provincial / State sides
Years	Team	Apps	(Points)
2013–	Baia Mare	35	(20)
- Correct as of 5 December 2015
International career
Years	Team	Apps	(Points)
2009–	Romania	34	(15)
- Correct as of 13 July 2019
National sevens team
Years	Team		Comps
2019-	Romania 7`s		1

Cătălin Ionuț Botezatu (born 12 December 1987) is a Romanian rugby union player. He plays in the wing and occasionally fullback position for amateur SuperLiga club Baia Mare and București based European Challenge Cup side the Wolves. Botezatu also plays for Romania's national team the Oaks.
