= Johnny Redelinghuys =

Namibia international rugby union player

- Born: Johannes Hermanus Redelinghuys; 7 February 1984 (age 42) Windhoek, Namibia
- Height: 5 ft 11 in (1.80 m)
- Weight: 111 kg (245 lb; 17 st 7 lb)

Rugby union career
- Position: Prop
Amateur team(s)
Years	Team	Apps	(Points)
2004	Free State Cheetahs Academy		
Senior career
Years	Team	Apps	(Points)
2005	Free State Cheetahs		
2006–present	Wanderers		
2011–present	Welwitschias		
International career
Years	Team	Apps	(Points)
2006–2015	Namibia	50	(25)

Johannes Hermanus Redelinghuys (born 7 February 1984 in Windhoek) is a Namibian rugby union prop. He is a member of the Namibia national rugby union team and participated with the squad at the 2007 Rugby World Cup.
