= Vlad Nistor (rugby union) =

- Born: Vlad Alexandru Nistor; 26 March 1994 (age 32) Gura Humorului, Romania
- Height: 1.91 m (6 ft 3 in)
- Weight: 105 kg (231 lb)
- Notable relative: Andrei Nistor (brother)

Rugby union career
- Position(s): Flanker, Number 8
- Current team: SC Albi
Senior career
Years	Team	Apps	(Points)
2016-	SC Albi		
International career
Years	Team	Apps	(Points)
2013–	Romania	25	(10)
- Correct as of 25 November 2017

Vlad Alexandru Nistor (born 26 March 1994) is a Romanian international rugby union player. He was a replacement player at the 2015 Rugby World Cup.

== Early life ==
Nistor was born in Gura Humorului, he began playing rugby at a young age, after following the family tradition in the sport. He captained majority of all his junior sides he played for, and at 18 he would make his way to France for a contract with the Academy of Rugby those at Castres Olympique, who had then just won the Top 14 title in one of the strongest leagues in Europe.
