= 2018 Rugby Europe Championship =

- Date: 10 February 2018 – 18 March 2018
- Countries: Belgium; Georgia; Germany; Romania; Russia; Spain

Tournament statistics
- Champions: Georgia (10th title)
- Grand Slam: Georgia (7th)
- Antim Cup: Georgia (11th title)
- Matches played: 15
- Attendance: 139,003 (9,267 per match)
- Tries scored: 109 (7.27 per match)
- Top point scorer(s): (Russia) Yuri Kushnarev (45)
- Top try scorer(s): (Romania) Sione Faka'osilea (3) (Romania) Paula Kinikinilau (3) (Georgia (country)) Giorgi Kveseladze (3) (Spain) Fernando López Pérez (3) (Russia) Anton Rudoy (3)
- Official website: Rugby International Championship

The 2018 Rugby Europe Championship is the premier rugby union competition outside of the Six Nations Championship in Europe. This is the second season under its new format, that saw Georgia, Germany, Romania, Russia, Spain and Belgium compete for the title.

This year's edition of the Rugby Europe Championship also served as a key stage of the European region qualification process for the 2019 Rugby World Cup. The team with the best record across the 2017 and 2018 Championships qualified as Europe 1. As Georgia have already secured qualification automatically, results involving that team are discarded for the purposes of Rugby World Cup qualification.

Both the Championship and the Qualification Process were heavily affected by controversial disciplinary issues involving player eligibility and the selection of neutral officials (namely, Romanian referee Vlad Iordachescu in Belgium-Spain). In respect of matters relating to the eligibility of players, following a full review of the evidence, including statements and submissions from World Rugby, Rugby Europe, Belgium, Romania, Spain and Russia, the independent committee found:

- Belgium had fielded one or more ineligible players on 7 occasions during the 2017 and 2018 Rugby Europe Championships (of which 6 matches related to Rugby World Cup 2019 qualifying);
- Romania has fielded one ineligible player on 8 occasions during the 2017 and 2018 Rugby Europe Championships (of which 6 matches related to Rugby World Cup 2019 qualifying);
- Spain had fielded one or more ineligible players on 9 occasions during the 2017 and 2018 Rugby Europe Championships (of which 8 matches related to Rugby World Cup 2019 qualifying).

In respect of sanctions, pursuant to Regulation 18, the independent committee determined the following:

The deduction of 5 points for any match in which a union fielded an ineligible player. in practice this meant the following

- 40-point deduction for Spain
- 30-point deduction for Belgium;
- 30-point deduction for Romania.

Therefore, based on a re-modelling of the Rugby Europe Championship tables in the context of Rugby World Cup 2019 qualifying, Russia would qualify as Europe 1 into Pool A replacing Romania and Germany will replace Spain in the European play-off against Portugal.

Georgia's victory in the 2018 Rugby Europe Championship itself was unaffected. Germany's proposed promotion/relegation play-off with Portugal, however, becomes a Romania-Portugal play-off. Ironically, Germany would now face Portugal in the Rugby World Cup European qualification play-off.

== Table ==
Champions
Advances to promotion/relegation play-off

Pos.	Team	Games				Points			Tries			TBP	LBP	GS	Table points
Pos.	Team	Played	Won	Drawn	Lost	For	Against	Diff	For	Against	Diff	TBP	LBP	GS	Table points
1	Georgia	5	5	0	0	188	35	+153	26	2	+25	3	0	1	24
2	Russia	5	2	0	3	142	84	+58	19	12	+7	2	1	0	11
3	Germany	5	0	0	5	34	359	−325	3	55	−52	0	0	0	0
4	Belgium	5	2	0	3	106	182	−76	14	26	−12	1	0	0	−1*
5	Spain	5	3	0	2	146	74	+72	19	4	+18	1	0	0	−7*
6	Romania	5	3	0	2	198	80	+118	28	9	+19	2	0	0	−11*
Source- Points were awarded to the teams as follows: Win – 4 points | Draw – 2 points | At least 3 more tries than opponent – 1 point | Loss within 7 points – 1 point | Loss greater than 7 points – 0 points | Completing a Grand Slam – (not counted towards World Cup qualification) * deducted points

== Fixtures ==
=== Week 1 ===
10 February 2018
14:00 GET (UTC+04)

(1 TBP) Georgia	47–0	Belgium
Try: Chilachava 9' c Mamukashvili 16' c Zhvania 26' c Tsiklauri 40+1' c Pruidze 55' m Todua 67' c Sitchinava 79' c Con: Tsiklauri (6/7) 10', 17', 27', 40+2', 68', 79'	Gamesheet

AIA Arena (Kutaisi), Kutaisi
Attendance: 4,900
Referee: Marius Mitrea (Italy)

LP	1	Zurab Zhvania		(substituted off) 52'
HK	2	Shalva Mamukashvili	(yellow card) 41' to 51'			(substituted off) 60'
TP	3	Levan Chilachava		(substituted off) 52'
LL	4	Giorgi Nemsadze (c)
RL	5	Nodar Tcheishvili		(substituted off) 70'
BF	6	Otar Giorgadze		43' to 52'
OF	7	Giorgi Tkhilaishvili		(substituted off) 41'
N8	8	Lasha Lomidze
SH	9	Gela Aprasidze		(substituted off) 60'
FH	10	Revaz Jinchvelashvili
LW	11	Alexander Todua
IC	12	Giorgi Kveseladze
OC	13	David Kacharava		(substituted off) 60'
RW	14	Giorgi Pruidze
FB	15	Beka Tsiklauri
Replacements:
HK	16	Giorgi Chkoidze		(substituted in) 43'	(substituted off) 52'	(substituted in) 60'
PR	17	Tornike Mataradze		(substituted in) 52'	(substituted off) 65'
PR	18	Giorgi Melikidze		(substituted in) 52'
FL	19	Mikheil Gachechiladze		(substituted in) 41'
FL	20	Guram Shengelia		(substituted in) 70'
SH	21	Vasil Lobzhanidze		(substituted in) 60'
FH	22	Lasha Malaguradze		(substituted in) 60'
WG	23	Anzor Sitchinava			(substituted in) 65'
Coach:
Milton Haig

LP	1	Lucas Sotteau	(substituted off) 52'
HK	2	Thomas Dienst (c)	(substituted off) 45'
TP	3	Sydney Mulumba	(substituted off) 41'
LL	4	Guillaume Mortier
RL	5	Sven d'Hooghe
BF	6	Bertrand Billi
OF	7	Amin Hamzaoui	(substituted off) 70'
N8	8	Brieuc Corradi	(substituted off) 20'
SH	9	Tom Cocqu	(substituted off) 45'
FH	10	Vincent Hart
LW	11	Ervin Muric
IC	12	Nathan Bontems
OC	13	Guillaume Piron
RW	14	Thomas Wallraf
FB	15	Dazzy Cornez	(substituted off) 41'
Replacements:
HK	16	Max Dubois	(substituted in) 45'
PR	17	Bastien Gallaire	(substituted in) 52'
PR	18	Tom Herenger
FL	19	Vincent Tauzia	(substituted in) 20'
FL	20	Isaac Montoisy	(substituted in) 45'
SH	21	Benjamin Cocu	(substituted in) 41'
CE	22	Louis Debatty	(substituted in) 70'
PR	23	Romain Pinte	(substituted in) 41'
Coach:
Guillaume Ajac

Touch judges:
Matteo Liperini (Italy)
Simone Boaretto (Italy)

10 February 2018
15:00 MSK (UTC+03)

(1 LBP) Russia	13–20	Spain
Try: Gerasimov 8' c Con: Kushnarev (1/1) 9'; Pen: Kushnarev (2/2) 29', 63'	Gamesheet	Try: Rouet (2) 25' m, 31' c Barthère 66' m Con: Linklater (1/3) 32'; Pen: Linklater (1/2) 40'

Kuban Stadium, Krasnodar
Attendance: 11,500
Referee: Frank Murphy (Ireland)

LP	1	Andrei Polivalov	(substituted off) 56'
HK	2	Stanislav Selskii	(substituted off) 46'
TP	3	Innoentiy Zykov	(substituted off) 79'
LL	4	Evgeny Elgin
RL	5	Andrei Ostrikov	(substituted off) 70'
BF	6	Victor Gresev	(substituted off) 48'
OF	7	Andrei Temnov
N8	8	Anton Rudoy
SH	9	Alexei Shcherban	(substituted off) 79'
FH	10	Ramil Gaisin
LW	11	Vasily Artemyev (c)	(substituted off) 74'
IC	12	Dmitri Gerasimov
OC	13	Igor Galinovskiy	(substituted off) 70'
RW	14	German Davydov
FB	15	Yuri Kushnarev
Replacements:
HK	16	Valery Tsnobiladze	(substituted in) 46'
PR	17	Valery Morozov	(substituted in) 56'
PR	18	Magomed Davudov	(substituted in) 79'
FL	19	Andrei Garbuzov	(substituted in) 70'
LK	20	Tagir Gadzhiev	(substituted in) 48'
FB	21	Vasily Dorofeev	(substituted in) 79'
WG	22	Vladislav Sozonov	(substituted in) 74'
CE	23	Sergey Trishin	(substituted in) 70'
Coach:
Aleksandr Pervukhin

LP	1	Beñat Auzqui	(substituted off) 56'
HK	2	Marco Pinto Ferrer	71' to 78'
TP	3	Jonathan García	(substituted off) 5'
LL	4	David Barrera
RL	5	Lucas Guillaume	(substituted off) 52'
BF	6	Pierre Barthère
OF	7	Gautier Gibouin
N8	8	Jaime Nava de Olano (c)	(substituted off) 63'
SH	9	Guillaume Rouet	(substituted off) 75'
FH	10	Mathieu Bélie	(substituted off) 74'
LW	11	Sebastien Ascarat
IC	12	Dan Snee
OC	13	Fabien Perrin
RW	14	Brad Linklater	(substituted off) 68'
FB	15	Charlie Malié
Replacements:
PR	16	Fernando López Pérez	(substituted in) 56'
HK	17	Juan Anaya Lazaro	(substituted in) 71'	(substituted off) 78'
PR	18	Anibal Bonán	(substituted in) 52'
FL	19	Thibaut Visensang	(substituted in) 63'
SH	20	Sébastien Rouet	(substituted in) 75'
CE	21	Ignacio Contardi Medina	(substituted in) 68'
WG	22	Bastien Fuster	(substituted in) 74'
PR	23	Jesús Moreno Rodríguez	(substituted in) 5'
Coach:
Santiago Santos

Touch judges:
Stuart Gaffikin (Ireland)
Chris Harrington (Ireland)

10 February 2018
16:00 EET (UTC+02)

(1 TBP) Romania	85–6	Germany
Try: Faka'osilea (2) 5' c, 60' c Lazăr 15' c Fonovai (2) 27' m, 35' c Macovei (2) 40' m, 69' m Burcea 44' c Kinikinilau (2) 47' c, 62' c Dumitru 51' c Coste 73' c Shennan 80'; Con: Vlaicu (8/10) 6', 16', 36', 45', 47', 53', 61', 63'; Calafeteanu (2/3) 75', 80+1'	Gamesheet	Pen: Menzel (2/3) 18', 31'

Cluj Arena, Cluj
Attendance: 1,500
Referee: Max Burlet (Belgium)

LP	1	Mihăiţă Lazăr	(substituted off) 55'
HK	2	Andrei Rădoi	(substituted off) 70'
TP	3	Andrei Ursache	(substituted off) 53'
LL	4	Johan van Heerden	(substituted off) 53'
RL	5	Marius Antonescu
BF	6	Valentin Ursache	(substituted off) 60'
OF	7	Mihai Macovei (c)
N8	8	Stelian Burcea
SH	9	Florin Surugiu	(substituted off) 48'
FH	10	Florin Vlaicu	(substituted off) 66'
LW	11	Ionuț Dumitru	(substituted off) 55'
IC	12	Sione Faka'osilea
OC	13	Paula Kinikinilau
RW	14	Tangimana Fonovai
FB	15	Cătălin Fercu
Replacements:
HK	16	Florin Bărdașu	(substituted in) 70'
PR	17	Ionel Badiu	(substituted in) 55'
PR	18	Alexandru Țăruș	(substituted in) 53'
LK	19	Alin Coste	(substituted in) 53'
FL	20	Andrei Gorcioaia	(substituted in) 60'
SH	21	Valentin Calafeteanu	(substituted in) 48'
WG	22	Stephen Shennan	(substituted in) 55'
WG	23	Jack Umaga	(substituted in) 66'
Coach:
Lynn Howells

LP	1	Julius Nostadt (c)	(substituted off) 56'
HK	2	Senzokuhle Ngubane	(substituted off) 69'
TP	3	Paul Weiss	(substituted off) 77'
LL	4	Eric Marks
RL	5	Stefan Mau
BF	6	Falk Duwe	(substituted off) 77'
OF	7	Rafael Dutta	(substituted off) 50'
N8	8	Luke Dyckhoff
SH	9	Tim Menzel
FH	10	Daniel Koch
LW	11	Christopher Korn	(substituted off) 70'
IC	12	Yassin Ayachi	(substituted off) 41'
OC	13	Robin Plümpe	(substituted off) 60'
RW	14	Paul Pfisterer
FB	15	Marvin Dieckmann
Replacements:
HK	16	Sam Ramsay	(substituted in) 69'
PR	17	Felix Martel	(substituted in) 77'
PR	18	Marcus Bender	(substituted in) 56'
FL	19	Yasar Bauer	(substituted in) 77'
N8	20	Carsten Lang	(substituted in) 50'
FB	21	Jan Piosik	(substituted in) 70'
WG	22	Mark Sztyndera	(substituted in) 41'
CE	23	Clemens von Grumbkow	(substituted in) 60'
Coach:
Pablo Lemoine

Touch judges:
John Catteau (Belgium)
Kevin Sulejmani (Belgium)

=== Week 2 ===
17 February 2018
15:00 MSK (UTC+03)

(1 TBP) Russia	48–7	Belgium
Try: Babaev 7' c Garbuzov 24' m Gadzhiev 39' c Elgin (2) 56' m, 71' c Galinovskiy 65' c Fedotko 74' c Con: Kushnarev (5/7) 8', 40', 66', 72', 75'; Pen: Kushnarev (1/1) 52'	Gamesheet	Try: Hart 47' c Con: Hart (1/1) 48'

Kuban Stadium, Krasnodar
Attendance: 6,000
Referee: Iñigo Atorrasagasti (Spain)

LP	1	Sergey Sekisov	(substituted off) 50'
HK	2	Valery Tsnobiladze	(substituted off) 53'
TP	3	Innoentiy Zykov	(substituted off) 66'
LL	4	Andrei Garbuzov	(substituted off) 50'
RL	5	Evgeny Elgin
BF	6	Andrei Temnov	(substituted off) 58'
OF	7	Tagir Gadzhiev
N8	8	Anton Rudoy
SH	9	Vasily Dorofeev	(substituted off) 57'
FH	10	Ramil Gaisin	(substituted off) 66'
LW	11	Vladislav Sozonov
IC	12	Dmitri Gerasimov
OC	13	Mikhail Babaev
RW	14	German Davydov	(substituted off) 58'
FB	15	Yuri Kushnarev (c)
Replacements:
HK	16	Nazir Gazanov	(substituted in) 53'
PR	17	Andrei Polivalov	(substituted in) 50'
PR	18	Magomed Davudov	(substituted in) 66'
LK	19	Bogdan Fedotko	(substituted in) 50'
FL	20	Viktor Gresev	(substituted in) 58'
SH	21	Alexei Shcherban	(substituted in) 57'
WG	22	Igor Galinovskiy	(substituted in) 58'
WG	23	Denis Simplikevich	(substituted in) 66'
Coach:
Aleksandr Pervukhin

LP	1	Lucas Sotteau	(substituted off) 45'
HK	2	Thomas Dienst	(substituted off) 45'
TP	3	Alexis Cuffolo	(substituted off) 59'
LL	4	Tuur Moelants
RL	5	Sven d'Hooghe	(substituted off) 63'
BF	6	Bertrand Billi
OF	7	Amin Hamzaoui	(substituted off) 45'
N8	8	Thomas Demolder
SH	9	Julien Berger (c)	(substituted off) 48'
FH	10	Sébastien Guns	(substituted off) 72'	(substituted in) 79'
LW	11	Louis Debatty	(substituted off) 66'
IC	12	Nathan Bontems
OC	13	Guillaume Piron
RW	14	Thomas Wallraf		(substituted off) 79'
FB	15	Vincent Hart
Replacements:
HK	16	Max Dubois	(substituted in) 45'
PR	17	Bastien Gallaire	(substituted in) 45'
LK	18	Guillaume Mortier	(substituted in) 63'
FL	19	Maxime Temmerman	(substituted in) 45'
WG	20	Eliott van Trappen	(substituted in) 66'
SH	21	Tom Cocqu	(substituted in) 48'
SH	22	Isaac Montoisy	(substituted in) 72'
PR	23	Romain Pinte	(substituted in) 59'
Coach:
Guillaume Ajac

Touch judges:
Jorge Molpeceres (Spain)
Eki Fanlo (Spain)

17 February 2018
14:30 CET (UTC+01)

Germany	0–64	Georgia (1 TBP)
	Gamesheet	Try: Kveseladze (3) 10' c, 62' c, 76' m Todua 15' m Chilachava 28' c Peikrishvili 49' c Gachechiladze 59' c Giorgadze 69' c Zhvania 73' m Khmaladze 80+1' c Con: Tsiklauri (7/10) 11', 29', 50', 60', 64', 70', 80+2'

Sparda-Bank-Hessen-Stadion, Offenbach am Main
Attendance: 2,150
Referee: Craig Evans (Wales)

LP	1	Marcus Bender		(substituted off) 75'
HK	2	Gilles Valette		(substituted off) 55'
TP	3	Felix Martel		(substituted off) 54'
LL	4	Eric Marks
RL	5	Stefan Mau		(substituted off) 60'
BF	6	Falk Duwe
OF	7	Kain Rix
N8	8	Luke Dyckhoff		(substituted off) 74'
SH	9	Oliver Paine		(substituted off) 65'
FH	10	Wynston Cameron-Dow
LW	11	Zani Dembele		(substituted off) 9'
IC	12	Clemens von Grumbkow (c)
OC	13	Robin Plümpe		(substituted off) 70'
RW	14	Paul Pfisterer	(yellow card) 51' to 62'
FB	15	Daniel Koch
Replacements:
HK	16	Sam Ramsay		(substituted in) 75'
PR	17	Senzokuhle Ngubane		(substituted in) 55'
PR	18	Paul Weiss		(substituted in) 54'
LK	19	Jens Listmann		(substituted in) 60'
N8	20	Carsten Lang		(substituted in) 74'
FB	21	Jan Piosik		(substituted in) 65'
CE	22	Yassin Ayachi		(substituted in) 70'
CE	23	Pascal Fischer		(substituted in) 9'
Coach:
Pablo Lemoine

LP	1	Mikheil Nariashvili	(substituted off) 57'
HK	2	Shalva Mamukashvili	(substituted off) 57'
TP	3	Levan Chilachava	(substituted off) 41'
LL	4	Giorgi Nemsadze (c)
RL	5	Nodar Tcheishvili	(substituted off) 60'
BF	6	Mikheil Gachechiladze
OF	7	Viktor Kolelishvili	(substituted off) 64'
N8	8	Lasha Lomidze
SH	9	Gela Aprasidze	(substituted off) 41'
FH	10	Lasha Khmaladze
LW	11	Alexander Todua	(substituted off) 73'
IC	12	Giorgi Kveseladze
OC	13	David Kacharava	(substituted off) 64'
RW	14	Anzor Sitchinava
FB	15	Beka Tsiklauri
Replacements:
HK	16	Badri Alkhazashvili	(substituted in) 57'
PR	17	Zurab Zhvania	(substituted in) 57'
PR	18	Anton Peikrishvili	(substituted in) 41'
FL	19	Otar Giorgadze	(substituted in) 60'
FL	20	Giorgi Tsutskiridze	(substituted in) 64'
SH	21	Vasil Lobzhanidze	(substituted in) 41'
FH	22	Lasha Malaguradze	(substituted in) 64'
WG	23	Giorgi Pruidze	(substituted in) 73'
Coach:
Milton Haig

Touch judges:
Mike English (Wales)
Dewi Philips (Wales)

18 February 2018
12:45 CET (UTC+01)

Spain	22–10	Romania
Try: Auzqui 4' m Ascarat 8' m Pen: Linklater (4/4) 21', 46', 62', 71'	Gamesheet	Try: Faka'osilea 77' c Con: Calafeteanu (1/1) 77'; Pen: Vlaicu (1/1) 13'

Estadio Nacional Complutense, Madrid
Attendance: 15,000
Referee: Thomas Charabas (France)

LP	1	Beñat Auzqui		(substituted off) 51'
HK	2	Marco Pinto Ferrer		(substituted off) 65'
TP	3	Jesús Moreno Rodríguez		(substituted off) 58'
LL	4	David Barrera
RL	5	Ilaitia Gavidi		(substituted off) 53'
BF	6	Pierre Barthère
OF	7	Lucas Guillaume		(substituted off) 69'
N8	8	Gautier Gibouin (c)
SH	9	Guillaume Rouet		(substituted off) 70'
FH	10	Mathieu Bélie		35' to 40'
LW	11	Sébastien Ascarat				(substituted off) 78'
IC	12	Dan Snee	(yellow card) 26' to 36'	(substituted off) 71'
OC	13	Fabien Perrin
RW	14	Brad Linklater
FB	15	Charlie Malié
Replacements:
PR	16	Fernando López Pérez		(substituted in) 51'
HK	17	Juan Anaya Lazaro		(substituted in) 65'
FL	18	Anibal Bonán		(substituted in) 53'
FL	19	Thibaut Visensang		(substituted in) 69'
SH	20	Sébastien Rouet		(substituted in) 70'
CE	21	Ignacio Contardi Medina		(substituted in) 35'	(substituted off) 40'	(substituted in) 78'
WG	22	Bastien Fuster		(substituted in) 71'
PR	23	Xerom Civil Bonaventure		(substituted in) 58'
Coach:
Santiago Santos

LP	1	Mihăiţă Lazăr		(substituted off) 53'
HK	2	Andrei Rădoi		(substituted off) 72'
TP	3	Andrei Ursache		(substituted off) 69'
LL	4	Johan van Heerden
RL	5	Marius Antonescu		(substituted off) 61'
BF	6	Valentin Ursache
OF	7	Mihai Macovei (c)
N8	8	Stelian Burcea		(substituted off) 69'
SH	9	Florin Surugiu		(substituted off) 62'
FH	10	Florin Vlaicu		(substituted off) 70'
LW	11	Stephen Shennan		(substituted off) 65'
IC	12	Sione Faka'osilea
OC	13	Paula Kinikinilau
RW	14	Tangimana Fonovai	(yellow card) 1' to 11'
FB	15	Cătălin Fercu
Replacements:
HK	16	Eugen Căpățână		(substituted in) 72'
PR	17	Ionel Badiu		(substituted in) 53'
PR	18	Alexandru Țăruș		(substituted in) 69'
LK	19	Valentin Popârlan		(substituted in) 61'
FL	20	Andrei Gorcioaia		(substituted in) 69'
SH	21	Valentin Calafeteanu		(substituted in) 62'
WG	22	Ionuț Dumitru		(substituted in) 65'
WG	23	Jack Umaga		(substituted in) 70'
Coach:
Lynn Howells

Touch judges:
Vivien Praderie (France)
Cyrille Le Gall (France)

=== Week 3 ===
3 March 2018
18:00 GET (UTC+04)

Georgia	23–10	Spain
Try: Penalty try 54'; Melikidze 80+7' c Con: Matiashvili (1/1) 80+8'; Pen: Matiashvili (3/4) 10', 28', 40'	Gamesheet	Try: Tauli 80+4' c Con: Peluchon (1/1) 80+5'; Pen: Peluchon (1/2) 34'

Mikheil Meskhi Stadium, Tbilisi
Attendance: 27,000
Referee: Ian Davies (Wales)

LP	1	Mikheil Nariashvili		(substituted off) 58'
HK	2	Shalva Mamukashvili		(substituted off) 62'
TP	3	Levan Chilachava		(substituted off) 62'
LL	4	Giorgi Nemsadze (c)
RL	5	Shalva Sutiashvili		(substituted off) 66'
BF	6	Giorgi Tkhilaishvili		(substituted off) 66'
OF	7	Viktor Kolelishvili
N8	8	Lasha Lomidze
SH	9	Vasil Lobzhanidze		(substituted off) 62'
FH	10	Lasha Khmaladze		(substituted off) 80+6'
LW	11	Alexander Todua
IC	12	Giorgi Kveseladze
OC	13	David Kacharava	(yellow card) 80+2' to 80+8'
RW	14	Anzor Sitchinava		(substituted off) 78'
FB	15	Soso Matiashvili
Replacements:
HK	16	Badri Alkhazashvili		(substituted in) 62'
PR	17	Zurab Zhvania		(substituted in) 58'
PR	18	Giorgi Melikidze		(substituted in) 62'
FL	19	Otar Giorgadze		(substituted in) 66'
FL	20	Mikheil Gachechiladze		(substituted in) 66'
SH	21	Gela Aprasidze		(substituted in) 62'
FH	22	Lasha Malaguradze		(substituted in) 80+6'
CE	23	Giorgi Koshadze		(substituted in) 78'
Coach:
Milton Haig

LP	1	Fernando López Pérez	(substituted off) 62'
HK	2	Quentin García	(substituted off) 66'
TP	3	Jesús Moreno Rodríguez	(substituted off) 48'
LL	4	David González	(substituted off) 60'
RL	5	Joshua Peters	(substituted off) 70'
BF	6	Asier Ussáraga Latierro
OF	7	Matthew Foulds
N8	8	Ilaitia Gavidi	(substituted off) 55'
SH	9	Sébastien Rouet	(substituted off) 60'
FH	10	Dan Snee (c)
LW	11	Silvio Casteglioni Algorriz	(substituted off) 55'
IC	12	Thibaut Álvarez
OC	13	Joan Losada Gifra
RW	14	Javier Carrión Llorens
FB	15	Mathieu Peluchon
Replacements:
PR	16	Jean-Baptiste Custoja	(substituted in) 62'
HK	17	Stephen Barnes	(substituted in) 66'
FL	18	Manuel Mora Ruiz	(substituted in) 60'
FL	19	Lionel Tauli	(substituted in) 55'
SH	20	Grégory Maiquez	(substituted in) 60'
CE	21	Iñaki Mateu Spuches	(substituted in) 70'
WG	22	Julen Goia Iriberri	(substituted in) 55'
PR	23	Alberto Blanco Alonso	(substituted in) 48'
Coach:
Santiago Santos

Touch judges:
Elgan Williams (Wales)
Gareth John (Wales)

3 March 2018
16:00 EET (UTC+02)

Romania	25–15	Russia
Try: Penalty try 6'; Shennan 49' m Kinikinilau 74' m Căpățână 79' m Pen: Calafeteanu (1/1) 38'	Gamesheet	Try: Gerasimov 30' m Gaisin 69' c Con: Gaisin (1/1) 70'; Pen: Kushnarev (1/1) 35'

Cluj Arena, Cluj
Attendance: 2,000
Referee: Alexandre Ruiz (France)

LP	1	Mihăiţă Lazăr	(substituted off) 50'
HK	2	Andrei Rădoi	(substituted off) 65'
TP	3	Alexandru Țăruș	(substituted off) 71'
LL	4	Johan van Heerden
RL	5	Valentin Popârlan	(substituted off) 61'
BF	6	Vlad Nistor	(substituted off) 41'
OF	7	Andrei Gorcioaia
N8	8	Stelian Burcea (c)
SH	9	Valentin Calafeteanu	(substituted off) 72'
FH	10	Jack Umaga
LW	11	Ionuț Dumitru
IC	12	Sione Faka'osilea
OC	13	Paula Kinikinilau
RW	14	Tangimana Fonovai	(substituted off) 34'
FB	15	Cătălin Fercu
Replacements:
HK	16	Eugen Căpățână	(substituted in) 65'
PR	17	Ionel Badiu	(substituted in) 50'
PR	18	Constantin Pristăviță	(substituted in) 71'
LK	19	Marius Antonescu	(substituted in) 61'
FL	20	Kuselo Moyake	(substituted in) 41'
SH	21	Florin Surugiu	(substituted in) 72'
WG	22	Stephen Shennan	(substituted in) 34'	(substituted off) 57'
FH	23	Florin Vlaicu		(substituted in) 57'
Coach:
Lynn Howells

LP	1	Sergey Sekisov	(substituted off) 50'
HK	2	Valery Tsnobiladze	(substituted off) 63'
TP	3	Innoentiy Zykov	(substituted off) 75'
LL	4	Andrei Garbuzov
RL	5	Evgeny Elgin	(substituted off) 75'
BF	6	Viktor Gresev	(substituted off) 71'
OF	7	Tagir Gadzhiev
N8	8	Dmitri Krotov
SH	9	Vasily Dorofeev	(substituted off) 50'
FH	10	Yuri Kushnarev (c)	(substituted off) 63'
LW	11	Evgeni Nepeivoda	(substituted off) 72'
IC	12	Dmitri Gerasimov
OC	13	Sergey Trishin
RW	14	Mikhail Babaev
FB	15	Ramil Gaisin
Replacements:
HK	16	Nazir Gazanov	(substituted in) 63'
PR	17	Andrei Polivalov	(substituted in) 50'
PR	18	Magomed Davudov	(substituted in) 75'
LK	19	Anton Sychev	(substituted in) 75'
N8	20	Anton Rudoy	(substituted in) 71'
SH	21	Alexei Shcherban	(substituted in) 50'
WG	22	Alexey Mikhaltsov	(substituted in) 72'
FB	23	Alexander Budychenko	(substituted in) 63'
Coach:
Mark McDermott

Touch judges:
Luc Ramos (France)
Pierre-Baptiste Nuchy (France)

3 March 2018
16:00 CET (UTC+01)

(1 TBP) Belgium	69–15	Germany
Try: Reynaert (2) 2' m, 79' c Berger 8' c Penalty try 14'; Williams 17' m Jadot 21' m Piron (2) 26' c, 54' m Benoy 31' c Hart 50' c d'Hooghe 67' c Con: Williams (6/10) 8', 27', 32', 51', 68', 89'	Gamesheet	Try: Listmann 65' m Harris 76' c Con: Cameron-Dow (1/2) 77'; Pen: Cameron-Dow (1/1) 6'

Nelson Mandela Sports Centre, Brussels
Attendance: 1,600
Referee: Pierre Brousset (France)

LP	1	Alexis Cuffolo	(substituted off) 45'
HK	2	Thomas Dienst	(substituted off) 41'
TP	3	Maxime Jadot	(substituted off) 53'
LL	4	Tuur Moelants	(substituted off) 50'
RL	5	Thomas Vervoort			(substituted off) 59'
BF	6	Gillian Benoy	10' to 14'
OF	7	Bertrand Billi
N8	8	Thomas Demolder
SH	9	Julien Berger	(substituted off) 55'
FH	10	Vincent Hart	(substituted off) 55'
LW	11	Craig Dowsett
IC	12	Jens Torfs (c)
OC	13	Guillaume Piron	(substituted off) 55'
RW	14	Charles Reynaert
FB	15	Alan Williams
Replacements:
PR	16	Victor Paquet	(substituted in) 41'
PR	17	Lucas Sotteau	(substituted in) 45'
LK	18	Sven d'Hooghe	(substituted in) 50'
FL	19	Amin Hamzaoui	(substituted in) 10'	(substituted off) 14'	(substituted in) 59'
FH	20	Sebastian Guns	(substituted in) 55'
SH	21	Tom Cocqu	(substituted in) 55'
CE	22	Nathan Bontems	(substituted in) 55'
PR	23	Romain Pinte	(substituted in) 53'
Coach:
Guillaume Ajac

LP	1	Marcus Bender	(substituted off) 73'
HK	2	Michail Tyumenev	(substituted off) 57'
TP	3	Paul Weiss	(substituted off) 57'
LL	4	Jens Listmann	(substituted off) 70'
RL	5	Stefan Mau	(substituted off) 32'
BF	6	Falk Duwe
OF	7	Eric Marks (c)
N8	8	Luke Dyckhoff
SH	9	Oliver Paine	(substituted off) 57'
FH	10	Wynston Cameron-Dow
LW	11	Nico Müller
IC	12	Robin Plümpe	(substituted off) 6'
OC	13	Sam Harris
RW	14	Pascal Fischer
FB	15	Lukas Deichmann
Replacements:
HK	16	Sam Ramsay	(substituted in) 73'
PR	17	Senzokuhle Ngubane	(substituted in) 70'
PR	18	Felix Martel	(substituted in) 57'
FL	19	Elias Haase	(substituted in) 32'
N8	20	Carsten Lang	(substituted in) 57'
FB	21	Jan Piosik	(substituted in) 57'
FL	22	Robert Lehmann		(substituted in) 70'
WG	23	Mark Sztyndera	(substituted in) 6'	(substituted off) 70'
Coach:
Pablo Lemoine

Touch judges:
Aurélie Groizeleau (France)
Clara Munarini (Italy)

=== Week 4 ===
10 March 2018
13:00 EET (UTC+02)

(1 TBP) Romania	62–12	Belgium
Try: Penalty try (3) 11', 43', 74'; Umaga 17' m Burcea 23' c Moyake (2) 28' c, 51' c Dumitru 54' m Badiu 64' c Con: Calafeteanu (2/3) 24', 30'; Fercu (1/2) 52'; Vlaicu (1/1) 64'; Pen: Calafeteanu 40'	Gamesheet	Try: Cocu 37' m Muric 75' c Con: Vassart (1/1) 76'

Stadionul Municipal, Buzău
Attendance: 2,000
Referee: Sam Grove-White (Scotland)

LP	1	Ionel Badiu	(yellow card) 33' to 43'			(substituted off) 66'
HK	2	Eugen Căpățână
TP	3	Alexandru Țăruș		(substituted off) 60'
LL	4	Johan van Heerden		(substituted off) 66'
RL	5	Valentin Popârlan
BF	6	Andrei Gorcioaia
OF	7	Kuselo Moyake
N8	8	Stelian Burcea (c)		39' to 41'		(substituted off) 55'
SH	9	Valentin Calafeteanu		(substituted off) 47'
FH	10	Jack Umaga
LW	11	Ionuț Dumitru
IC	12	Sione Faka'osilea		(substituted off) 56'
OC	13	Paula Kinikinilau
RW	14	Marius Simionescu		(substituted off) 73'
FB	15	Cătălin Fercu
Replacements:
HK	16	Andrei Rădoi
PR	17	Constantin Pristăviță		(substituted in) 39'	(substituted off) 41'	(substituted in) 66'
PR	18	Alex Gordaș		(substituted in) 60'
LK	19	Adrian Motoc		(substituted in) 66'
FL	20	Razvan Iliescu				(substituted in) 55'
SH	21	Florin Surugiu		(substituted in) 47'
WG	22	Robert Neagu		(substituted in) 73'
FH	23	Florin Vlaicu		(substituted in) 56'
Coach:
Lynn Howells

LP	1	Lucas Sotteau		(substituted off) 41'
HK	2	Alexis Cuffolo		(substituted off) 49'
TP	3	James Pearse	(yellow card) 70' to 80'
LL	4	Tom Herenger
RL	5	Sven d'Hooghe
BF	6	Gillian Benoy		(substituted off) 55'
OF	7	Amin Hamzaoui	(yellow card) 47' to 57'	(substituted off) 72'
N8	8	Maxime Temmerman		(substituted off) 35'
SH	9	Oliver Claxton
FH	10	Sebastien Guns		(substituted off) 64'
LW	11	Ervin Muric
IC	12	Florian Piron		(substituted off) 61'
OC	13	Benjamin Cocu
RW	14	Thomas Wallraf
FB	15	Craig Dowsett (c)		(substituted off) 55'
Replacements:
HK	16	Thomas Dienst		(substituted in) 49'
PR	17	Romain Pinte		(substituted in) 41'
LK	18	Tuur Moelants		(substituted in) 55'
N8	19	Keran Caro		(substituted in) 35'
CE	20	Louis Debatty		(substituted in) 61'
SH	21	Isaac Montoisy		(substituted in) 64'
CE	22	Antoine Vassart		(substituted in) 55'
PR	23	Adelin Mehrez		(substituted in) 72'
Coach:
Guillaume Ajac (France)

Touch judges:
Keith Allen (Scotland)
Graeme Ormiston (Scotland)

10 March 2018
15:00 MSK (UTC+03)

Russia	9–29	Georgia (1 TBP)
Pen: Kushnarev (3/3) 17', 30', 39'	Gamesheet	Try: Peikrishvili 25' c Asieshvili 66' c Gachechiladze 72' c Kvirikashvili 76' m Con: Matiashvili (3/3) 26', 67', 73'; Pen: Matiashvili (1/1) 48'

Kuban Stadium, Krasnodar
Attendance: 3,000
Referee: Anthony Woodthorpe (England)

LP	1	Sergey Sekisov	(substituted off) 58'
HK	2	Stanislav Selskiy	(substituted off) 64'
TP	3	Evgeny Pronenko	(substituted off) 74'
LL	4	Andrei Garbuzov
RL	5	Evgeny Elgin
BF	6	Viktor Gresev
OF	7	Tagir Gadzhiev	(substituted off) 52'
N8	8	Anton Rudoy	(substituted off) 68'
SH	9	Vasily Dorofeev	(substituted off) 64'
FH	10	Yuri Kushnarev (c)
LW	11	Evgeni Nepeivoda	(substituted off) 71'
IC	12	Dmitri Gerasimov
OC	13	Sergey Trishin	(substituted off) 74'
RW	14	Mikhail Babaev
FB	15	Ramil Gaisin
Replacements:
HK	16	Nazir Gazanov	(substituted in) 64'
PR	17	Andrei Polivalov	(substituted in) 58'
PR	18	Magomed Davudov	(substituted in) 74'
LK	19	Alexander Ilyin	(substituted in) 68'
LK	20	Anton Sychev	(substituted in) 52'
SH	21	Alexei Shcherban	(substituted in) 64'
WG	22	Alexey Mikhaltsov	(substituted in) 71'
FB	23	Alexander Budychenko	(substituted in) 74'
Coach:
Mark McDermott

LP	1	Mikheil Nariashvili	(substituted off) 58'
HK	2	Shalva Mamukashvili	(substituted off) 68'
TP	3	Anton Peikrishvili	(substituted off) 49'
LL	4	Giorgi Nemsadze (c)
RL	5	Nodar Tcheishvili	(substituted off) 61'
BF	6	Giorgi Tkhilaishvili
OF	7	Viktor Kolelishvili
N8	8	Lasha Lomidze
SH	9	Vasil Lobzhanidze
FH	10	Lasha Khmaladze
LW	11	Soso Matiashvili	(substituted off) 74'
IC	12	Giorgi Kveseladze	(substituted off) 71'
OC	13	David Kacharava
RW	14	Anzor Sitchinava	(substituted off) 76'
FB	15	Merab Kvirikashvili
Replacements:
HK	16	Badri Alkhazashvili	(substituted in) 68'
PR	17	Karlen Asieshvili	(substituted in) 58'
PR	18	Giorgi Melikidze	(substituted in) 49'
LK	19	Shalva Sutiashvili	(substituted in) 61'
FL	20	Mikheil Gachechiladze
SH	21	Gela Aprasidze	(substituted in) 76'
FH	22	Lasha Malaguradze	(substituted in) 71'
CE	23	Giorgi Koshadze	(substituted in) 74'
Coach:
Milton Haig

Touch judges:
Michael Hudson (England)
Alex Bryzgalin (Russia)

11 March 2018
12:30 CET (UTC+01)

(1 TBP) Spain	84–10	Germany
Try: Barthère 13' c Contardi Medina 17' c Penalty try 20'; Bonán (2) 27' m, 64' m Álvarez 33' c Gibouin 41'; López Pérez (2) 49' c, 68' c Visensang 55' c Ascarat 76' m Linklater 80+4'; Con: Peluchon (6/7) 13', 18', 33', 41', 49', 55'; Linklater (2/4) 68', 80+4'; Pen: Peluchon (2/2) 3', 7'	Gamesheet	Try: Hees 60' c Con: Koch (1/1) 60'; Pen: Koch (1/1) 52'

Estadio Nacional Complutense, Madrid
Attendance: 15,753
Referee: Marius Mitrea (Italy)

LP	1	Beñat Auzqui	(substituted off) 41'
HK	2	Marco Pinto Ferrer	(substituted off) 41'
TP	3	Jesús Moreno Rodríguez	(substituted off) 41'
LL	4	Anibal Bonán
RL	5	David Barrera
BF	6	Pierre Barthère			(substituted off) 48'
OF	7	Gautier Gibouin	(substituted off) 55'
N8	8	Jaime Nava de Olano (c)	25' to 39'
SH	9	Guillaume Rouet	(substituted off) 41'
FH	10	Mathieu Bélie	(substituted off) 41'
LW	11	Sébastien Ascarat
IC	12	Thibaut Álvarez
OC	13	Fabien Perrin
RW	14	Ignacio Contardi Medina
FB	15	Mathieu Peluchon	(substituted off) 61'
Replacements:
PR	16	Fernando López Pérez	(substituted in) 41'
HK	17	Juan Anaya Lazaro	(substituted in) 41'
FL	18	Ilaitia Gavidi	(substituted in) 55'
FL	19	Thibaut Visensang	(substituted in) 25'	(substituted off) 39'	(substituted in) 48'
SH	20	Sébastien Rouet	(substituted in) 41'
CE	21	Dan Snee	(substituted in) 41'
FB	22	Brad Linklater	(substituted in) 61'
PR	23	Alberto Blanco Alfonso	(substituted in) 41'
Coach:
Santiago Santos

LP	1	Senzokuhle Ngubane		(substituted off) 47'
HK	2	Michail Tyumenev		(substituted off) 47'
TP	3	Matthias Schösser		(substituted off) 70'
LL	4	Jens Listmann
RL	5	Eric Marks (c)		79' to 80+4'
BF	6	Elias Haase		(substituted off) 57'
OF	7	Falk Duwe	(yellow card) 20' to 30'	(substituted off) 70'
N8	8	Carsten Lang		(substituted off) 41'
SH	9	Jan Piosik
FH	10	Kieron Davies
LW	11	Nico Müller		(substituted off) 41'
IC	12	Tomás van Gelderen
OC	13	Yassin Ayachi		(substituted off) 55'
RW	14	Zinzan Hees
FB	15	Daniel Koch
Replacements:
HK	16	Sam Ramsay		(substituted in) 70'
PR	17	Felix Martel		(substituted in) 70'
PR	18	Marcus Bender		(substituted in) 47'
HK	19	Gilles Valette		(substituted in) 47'
FL	20	Robert Lehmann		(substituted in) 57'
WG	21	Christopher Korn		(substituted in) 55'
CE	22	Pascal Fischer		(substituted in) 41'
CE	23	Kain Rix		(substituted in) 41'
Coach:
Pablo Lemoine

Touch judges:
Andrea Piardi (Italy)
Matteo Franco (Italy)

=== Week 5 ===
18 March 2018
16:00 GET (UTC+04)

Georgia	25–16	Romania
Try: Lomidze 20' c Sitchinava 42' c Asieshvili 69' m Con: Matiashvili (2/3) 21', 43'; Pen: Matiashvili (2/2) 8', 47'	Gamesheet	Try: Rădoi 78' c Con: Vlaicu (1/1) 78'; Pen: Vlaicu (3/3) 11', 37', 60'

Boris Paichadze Dinamo Arena, Tbilisi
Attendance: 38,000
Referee: Ludovic Cayre (France)

LP	1	Mikheil Nariashvili		(substituted off) 51'
HK	2	Shalva Mamukashvili		(substituted off) 54'
TP	3	Levan Chilachava		(substituted off) 60'
LL	4	Giorgi Nemsadze (c)	(yellow card) 36' to 46'
RL	5	Nodar Tcheishvili		(substituted off) 54'	(substituted in) 57'	(substituted off) 60'
BF	6	Giorgi Tkhilaishvili
OF	7	Viktor Kolelishvili		(substituted off) 54'
N8	8	Lasha Lomidze			57' to 60'
SH	9	Vasil Lobzhanidze		(substituted off) 71'
FH	10	Lasha Khmaladze
LW	11	Soso Matiashvili
IC	12	Giorgi Kveseladze		(substituted off) 74'
OC	13	David Kacharava
RW	14	Anzor Sitchinava
FB	15	Merab Kvirikashvili		(substituted off) 63'
Replacements:
HK	16	Badri Alkhazashvili		(substituted in) 54'
PR	17	Karlen Asieshvili		(substituted in) 51'
PR	18	Giorgi Melikidze		(substituted in) 60'
LK	19	Shalva Sutiashvili		(substituted in) 54'
FL	20	Mikheil Gachechiladze		(substituted in) 54'
SH	21	Gela Aprasidze		(substituted in) 71'
FH	22	Lasha Malaguradze		(substituted in) 74'
WG	23	Alexander Todua		(substituted in) 63'
Coach:
Milton Haig

LP	1	Ionel Badiu	(yellow card) 19' to 30'			(substituted off) 70'
HK	2	Eugen Căpățână		(substituted off) 59'
TP	3	Alexandru Țăruș		(substituted off) 60'
LL	4	Johan van Heerden	(yellow card) 48' to 58'
RL	5	Valentin Popârlan
BF	6	Dumani Mtya		(substituted off) 65'
OF	7	Kuselo Moyake
N8	8	Stelian Burcea (c)		(substituted off) 72'
SH	9	Florin Surugiu		(substituted off) 62'
FH	10	Jack Umaga
LW	11	Ionuț Dumitru		(substituted off) 19'	(substituted in) 30'
IC	12	Florin Vlaicu
OC	13	Paula Kinikinilau		(substituted off) 41'
RW	14	Tangimana Fonovai
FB	15	Cătălin Fercu		(substituted off) 70'
Replacements:
HK	16	Andrei Rădoi		(substituted in) 59'
PR	17	Mihăiţă Lazăr		(substituted in) 19'	(substituted off) 30'	(substituted in) 70'
PR	18	Constantin Pristăviță		(substituted in) 60'
LK	19	Adrian Motoc		(substituted in) 72'
FL	20	Christian Chirica		(substituted in) 65'
SH	21	Valentin Calafeteanu		(substituted in) 62'
WG	22	Marius Simionescu		(substituted in) 70'
CE	23	Sione Faka'osilea		(substituted in) 41'
Coach:
Lynn Howells

Touch judges:
Nicolas Dabas (France)
Sébastien Boyer (France)

18 March 2018
13:00 CET (UTC+01)

Germany	3–57	Russia (1 TBP)
Pen: Müller 6'	Gamesheet	Try: Tsnobiladze (2) 10' c, 18' m Rudoy (3) 26' c, 29' c, 80+1' m Krotov 32' c Budychenko 49'; Mikhaltsov (2) 57' c, 75' m Con: Kushnarev (6/7) 11', 26', 30', 34', 50', 58'

Sportpark Höhenberg, Köln
Attendance: 2,600
Referee: Ian Tempest (England)

LP	1	Alexander Lidell		(substituted off) 66'
HK	2	Senzokuhle Ngubane
TP	3	Felix Martel		(substituted off) 53'
LL	4	Stefan Mau	(yellow card) 23' to 33'	(substituted off) 55'
RL	5	Jens Listmann
BF	6	Eric Marks (c)
OF	7	Robert Lehmann		(substituted off) 64'
N8	8	Falk Duwe		(substituted off) 69'
SH	9	Jan Piosik		(substituted off) 53'
FH	10	Oliver Paine
LW	11	Nico Müller
IC	12	Pascal Fischer
OC	13	Christopher Korn
RW	14	Florian Wehrspann
FB	15	Manuel Müller
Replacements:
HK	16	Sam Ramsay		(substituted in) 66'
PR	17
PR	18	Marcus Bender		(substituted in) 53'
LK	19	Christian Hug		(substituted in) 55'
N8	20	Carsten Lang		(substituted in) 64'
FH	21	Kieron Davies		(substituted in) 53'
FL	22	Elias Haase		(substituted in) 69'
CE	23	Yassin Ayachi
Coach:
Pablo Lemoine

LP	1	Andrei Polivalov	(substituted off) 53'
HK	2	Valery Tsnobiladze	(substituted off) 53'
TP	3	Evgeny Pronenko	(substituted off) 61'
LL	4	Andrei Garbuzov	(substituted off) 53'
RL	5	Evgeny Elgin
BF	6	Viktor Gresev	(substituted off) 61'
OF	7	Dmitri Krotov
N8	8	Anton Rudoy
SH	9	Vasily Dorofeev	(substituted off) 58'
FH	10	Yuri Kushnarev (c)	(substituted off) 69'
LW	11	Alexey Mikhaltsov
IC	12	Dmitri Gerasimov
OC	13	Sergey Trishin	(substituted off) 66'
RW	14	Mikhail Babaev
FB	15	Alexander Budychenko
Replacements:
HK	16	Stanislav Selskiy	(substituted in) 53'
PR	17	Sergey Sekisov	(substituted in) 53'
PR	18	Evgeny Mishechkin	(substituted in) 61'
LK	19	Alexander Ilyin	(substituted in) 53'
FL	20	Nikita Vavilin	(substituted in) 61'
SH	21	Alexei Shcherban	(substituted in) 58'
SH	22	Konstantin Uzunov	(substituted in) 69'
FB	23	Viktor Kononov	(substituted in) 66'
Coach:
Mark McDermott

Touch judges:
Simon Harding (England)
Clive Sharp (England)

18 March 2018
13:00 CET (UTC+01)

Belgium	18–10	Spain
Pen: Hart (6/7) 20', 24', 29', 37', 49', 76'	Gamesheet	Try: López Pérez 70' c Con: Peluchon (1/1) 70'; Pen: Peluchon (1/1) 74'

King Baudouin Stadium – Annex 2, Brussels
Attendance: 3,000
Referee: Vlad Iordăchescu (Romania)

LP	1	Julien Massimi	(substituted off) 46'
HK	2	Thomas Dienst	(substituted off) 61'
TP	3	Maxime Jadot	(substituted off) 70'
LL	4	Bertrand Billi	(substituted off) 78'
RL	5	Tuur Moelants	(substituted off) 60'
BF	6	Gillian Benoy
OF	7	Jean-Maurice Decubber	(substituted off) 79'
N8	8	Thomas Demolder
SH	9	Julien Berger	(substituted off) 79'
FH	10	Vincent Hart
LW	11	Craig Dowsett
IC	12	Jens Torfs (c)
OC	13	Guillaume Piron
RW	14	Ervin Muric
FB	15	Charles Reynaert	(substituted off) 63'
Replacements:
PR	16	Alexis Cuffolo	(substituted in) 61'
PR	17	Lucas Sotteau	(substituted in) 46'
LK	18	Sven d'Hooghe	(substituted in) 79'
N8	19	Keran Caro	(substituted in) 60'
FL	20	Amin Hamzaoui	(substituted in) 79'
SH	21	Sebastien Guns	(substituted in) 79'
WG	22	Thomas Wallraf	(substituted in) 63'
PR	23	Romain Pinte	(substituted in) 70'
Coach:
Guillaume Ajac

LP	1	Beñat Auzqui	(yellow card) 48' to 58'	(substituted off) 60'
HK	2	Marco Pinto Ferrer		(substituted off) 56'
TP	3	Jesús Moreno Rodríguez		(substituted off) 66'
LL	4	David Barrera		(substituted off) 49'
RL	5	Ilaitia Gavidi		(substituted off) 70'
BF	6	Pierre Barthère
OF	7	Lucas Guillaume
N8	8	Gautier Gibouin (c)
SH	9	Guillaume Rouet
FH	10	Mathieu Bélie
LW	11	Sébastien Ascarat		(substituted off) 60'
IC	12	Dan Snee		(substituted off) 66'
OC	13	Fabien Perrin
RW	14	Brad Linklater
FB	15	Charlie Malie
Replacements:
PR	16	Fernando López Pérez		(substituted in) 60'
HK	17	Quentin García		(substituted in) 56'
LK	18	Anibal Bonán		(substituted in) 49'
FL	19	Thibaut Visensang		(substituted in) 70'
SH	20	Sébastien Rouet
FB	21	Mathieu Peluchon		(substituted in) 66'
CE	22	Ignacio Contardi Medina		(substituted in) 60'
PR	23	Alberto Blanco Alfonso		(substituted in) 66'
Coach:
Santiago Santos

Touch judges:
Radu Petrescu (Romania)
Alexandru Ionescu (Romania)

== Relegation/promotion play-off ==
10 November 2018
16:00 EET (UTC+02)

Romania	36–6	Portugal
	Gamesheet

Stadionul Lascăr Ghineț (Arena Zimbrilor), Baia Mare
Attendance: 3,000
Referee: Ian Tempest (England)

== See also ==
- Rugby Europe International Championships
- 2017–18 Rugby Europe International Championships
- 2019 Rugby World Cup – Europe qualification
- Six Nations Championship
- Antim Cup
