= 2017–18 Rugby Europe International Championships =

- Date: October 2017 – June 2018
- Countries: 35

Tournament statistics
- Champions: Championship; Georgia (10); Trophy; Portugal (2); Conference 1 Lithuania (2); Malta (2); Conference 2 Luxembourg (1); Cyprus (1); Development; Bulgaria (1)
- Antim Cup: (Georgia (country)) (11th title)
- Matches played: 73
- Attendance: 190,278 (2,607 per match)
- Tries scored: 509 (6.97 per match)
- Top point scorer(s): Championship (Russia) Yuri Kushnarev (45); Trophy (Netherlands) Liam McBride (57); Conference (Denmark) Cassius Deschamps (59); Development (Bulgaria) Petar Nikolov (41)
- Top try scorer(s): Championship (Romania) Sione Faka'osilea (3) (Romania) Paula Kinikinilau (3) (Georgia (country)) Giorgi Kveseladze (3) (Spain) Fernando López Pérez (3) (Russia) Anton Rudoy (3); Trophy (Netherlands) Sep Visser (8); Conference (Luxembourg) Gauthier Bares (5) (Serbia) Igor Dejanović (5) (Malta) James Kirk (5) (Denmark) Christian Melgaard (5) (Malta) Luke Watts (5); Development (Bulgaria) Ivayilo Ivanov (4)
- Official website: Rugby Europe

The 2017–18 Rugby Europe International Championships is the European Championship for tier 2 and tier 3 rugby union nations. The 2017–18 season is the second of its new format and structure, where all Levels play on a one-year cycle, replacing the old format of a two-year cycle, with the teams playing each other both home and away.

For all teams competing in the Championship, except for Georgia, this year's edition of the Rugby Europe International Championships doubles as the second year of 2019 Rugby World Cup qualifiers for the European region, where the winner of the two-year cycle, excluding Georgia, automatically qualifies to the tournament as Europe 1. All other teams remain in contention, playing in their respective leagues, but also playing in World Cup play-offs, for the right to play in the Europe/Oceania play-off against Oceania 3.

== Countries ==
Pre-tournament World Rugby rankings in parentheses. Trophy and Conference as of 9 October 2017. Championship as of 5 February 2018.

Championship

- Belgium (29) ‡
- Georgia (12)
- Germany (27)
- Romania (15) *
- Russia (19)
- Spain (20)

Conference 1
North

- Hungary (70) ↑
- Latvia (50)
- Lithuania (38)
- Sweden (61)
- Ukraine (37) ↓

Conference 2
North

- Denmark (86)
- Estonia (NR) ‡
- Finland (102)
- Luxembourg (63) ↓
- Norway (92)

Development

- Bulgaria
- Montenegro
- Turkey ↓

Trophy

- Czech Republic (32) ↑
- Moldova (36)
- Netherlands (33)
- Poland (34)
- Portugal (25) •
- Switzerland (30)

South

- Andorra (65)
- Bosnia and Herzegovina (71) ↑
- Croatia (57)
- Israel (59)
- Malta (45) •

South

- Austria (85)
- Cyprus (NR) ↓
- Serbia (78)
- Slovakia (NR) ↑
- Slovenia (75)

Legend:
* Champion of 2016–17 season; ↑ Promoted from lower division during 2016–17 season; • Division Champion but not promoted during 2016–17 season; ‡ Last place inside own division but not relegated during 2016–17 season; ↓ Relegated from higher division during 2016–17 season.

== 2018 Rugby Europe Championship ==
The six teams participating in the 2018 Championship remain the same as the 2017 season, after Belgium survived a relegation threat by defeating Portugal in a playoff in May 2017. Following the match on 18 March 2018 between Belgium and Spain, an appeal by the Spanish Rugby Federation to World Rugby and Rugby Europe was published for the match to be replayed, following the appointment of a Romanian referee – Romania needed Spain to lose in order to qualify. In the meantime, World Rugby also received complaints amid European countries fielding ineligible players, in breach of Regulation 8, during the qualification process; issues were made against all competing five nations. The appeal from Spain for their match to be replayed was held whilst the appointed panel investigated the accused ineligible players, although the final verdict around the Belgium–Spain was for the result to stand. The neutral panel cleared Germany and Russia of the alleged ineligible players, but found Belgium, Romania and Spain guilty of breaching Regulation 8. The panel determined that each nation would be deducted 5 points for each game they had fielded an ineligible player, regardless of if more than one ineligible player had been fielded. The investigation found that Belgium and Romania had fielded ineligible players 6 times (a deduction of 30 points) and Spain 8 times (a deduction of 40 points) during the qualification process. This meant, with the deducted points for the respective nations, Russia would qualify ahead of Romania and Germany would advance to the play-off's ahead of Spain.

Champions
Advances Promotion/
Relegation play-off

Pos.	Team	Games				Points			TBP	LBP	GS	Table points
Pos.	Team	Played	Won	Drawn	Lost	For	Against	Diff	TBP	LBP	GS	Table points
1	Georgia	5	5	0	0	188	35	+153	3	0	1	24
2	Russia	5	2	0	3	142	84	+58	2	1	0	11
3	Germany	5	0	0	5	34	359	−325	0	0	0	0
4	Belgium	5	2	0	3	106	182	−76	1	0	0	-1*
5	Spain	5	3	0	2	146	74	+72	1	0	0	-7*
6	Romania	5	3	0	2	198	80	+118	2	0	0	-11*
Points were awarded to the teams as follows: Win – 4 points : Draw – 2 points : Loss within 7 points – 1 point : Loss greater than 7 points – 0 points: At least 3 more tries than opponent- 1 point Completing a Grand Slam – 1 point (will not be counted towards World Cup Qualification) * deducted points

Matches

10 February 2018
14:00 GET (UTC+04)

(1 TBP) Georgia	47–0	Belgium
	Gamesheet

AIA Arena (Kutaisi), Kutaisi
Attendance: 4,900
Referee: (Italy) Marius Mitrea

10 February 2018
15:00 MSK (UTC+03)

(1 LBP) Russia	13–20	Spain
	Gamesheet

Kuban Stadium, Krasnodar
Attendance: 11,500
Referee: (Ireland) Frank Murphy

10 February 2018
16:00 EET (UTC+02)

(1 TBP) Romania	85–6	Germany
	Gamesheet

Cluj Arena, Cluj
Attendance: 1,500
Referee: (Belgium) Max Burlet

17 February 2018
15:00 MSK (UTC+03)

(1 TBP) Russia	48–7	Belgium
	Gamesheet

Kuban Stadium, Krasnodar
Attendance: 6,000
Referee: (Spain) Iñigo Atorrasagasti

17 February 2018
14:30 CET (UTC+01)

Germany	0–64	Georgia (1 TBP)
	Gamesheet

Sparda-Bank-Hessen-Stadion, Offenbach am Main
Attendance: 2,150
Referee: (Wales) Craig Evans

18 February 2018
12:45 CET (UTC+01)

Spain	22–10	Romania
	Gamesheet

Estadio Nacional Complutense, Madrid
Attendance: 15,000
Referee: (France) Thomas Charabas

3 March 2018
18:00 GET (UTC+04)

Georgia	23–10	Spain
	Gamesheet

Mikheil Meskhi Stadium, Tbilisi
Attendance: 30,000
Referee: (Wales) Ian Davies

3 March 2018
16:00 EET (UTC+02)

Romania	25–15	Russia
	Gamesheet

Cluj Arena, Cluj
Attendance: 2,000
Referee: (France) Alexandre Ruiz

3 March 2018
16:00 CET (UTC+01)

(1 TBP) Belgium	69–15	Germany
	Gamesheet

Nelson Mandela Sports Centre, Brussels
Attendance: 1,600
Referee: (France) Pierre Brousset

10 March 2018
13:00 EET (UTC+02)

(1 TBP) Romania	62–12	Belgium
	Gamesheet

Stadionul Municipal, Buzău
Attendance: 2,000
Referee: (Scotland) Sam Grove-White

10 March 2018
15:00 MSK (UTC+03)

Russia	9–29	Georgia (1 TBP)
	Gamesheet

Kuban Stadium, Krasnodar
Attendance: 3,000
Referee: (England) Anthony Woodthorpe

11 March 2018
12:30 CET (UTC+01)

(1 TBP) Spain	84–10	Germany
	Gamesheet

Estadio Nacional Complutense, Madrid
Attendance: 15,753
Referee: (Italy) Marius Mitrea

18 March 2018
16:00 GET (UTC+04)

(1 TBP) Georgia	25–16	Romania
	Gamesheet

Boris Paichadze Dinamo Arena, Tbilisi
Attendance: 38,000
Referee: (France) Pierre Brousset

18 March 2018
13:00 CET (UTC+01)

Germany	3–57	Russia (1 TBP)
	Gamesheet

Sportpark Höhenberg, Köln
Attendance: 2,600
Referee: (England) Ian Tempest

18 March 2018
13:00 CET (UTC+01)

Belgium	18–10	Spain
	Gamesheet

King Baudouin Stadium – Annex 2, Brussels
Attendance: 3,000
Referee: (Romania) Vlad Iordăchescu

== 2017–18 Rugby Europe Trophy ==
Champions and
advances to Promotion/
Relegation play-off
Relegated

Pos.	Team	Games				Points			TBP	LBP	GS	Table points
Pos.	Team	Played	Won	Drawn	Lost	For	Against	Diff	TBP	LBP	GS	Table points
1	Portugal	5	5	0	0	168	76	+92	2	0	1	23
2	Netherlands	5	4	0	1	199	110	+89	3	0	0	19
3	Czech Republic	5	3	0	2	93	120	−27	0	0	0	12
4	Switzerland	5	2	0	3	109	122	−13	0	2	0	10
5	Poland	5	1	0	4	106	147	−41	0	3	0	7
6	Moldova	5	0	0	5	58	158	−100	0	1	0	1
Points were awarded to the teams as follows: Win – 4 points : Draw – 2 points : Loss within 7 points – 1 point : Loss greater than 7 points – 0 points: At least 3 more tries than opponent- 1 point Completing a Grand Slam – 1 point (will not be counted towards World Cup Qualification)

Matches

28 October 2017
15:00 CEST (UTC+02)

Czech Republic	19–14	Poland (1 LBP)
	Gamesheet

Stadion Markéta, Prague
Attendance: 1,500
Referee: (Romania) Vlad Iordăchescu

11 November 2017
13:30 EET (UTC+02)

Moldova	7–59	Netherlands (1 TBP)
	Gamesheet

Complexul Sportiv Raional, Orhei
Attendance: 400
Referee: (Italy) Claudio Blessano

18 November 2017
15:00 WET (UTC+00)

(1 TBP) Portugal	45–12	Czech Republic
	Gamesheet

CAR Rugby do Jamor, Oeiras
Attendance: 1,000
Referee: (England) Christophe Ridley

18 November 2017
15:00 CET (UTC+01)

(1 LBP) Switzerland	27–30	Netherlands
	Gamesheet

Stade Municipal, Yverdon-les-Bains
Attendance: 2,000
Referee: (Spain) Iñigo Atorrasagasti

18 November 2017
17:30 CET (UTC+01)

Poland	13–0	Moldova
	Gamesheet

MoSiR Stadium, Gdańsk
Attendance: 3,000
Referee: (Portugal) Paulo Duarte

25 November 2017
13:15 EET (UTC+02)

(1 LBP) Moldova	20–22	Switzerland
	Gamesheet

Complexul Sportiv Raional, Orhei
Attendance: 300
Referee: (Ireland) Nigel Correll

10 February 2018
15:00 WET (UTC+00)

(1 TBP) Portugal	36–12	Netherlands
	Gamesheet

CAR Rugby do Jamor, Oeiras
Attendance: 1,500
Referee: (France) Minery Sebastien

24 February 2018
15:00 WET (UTC+00)

Portugal	31–17	Switzerland
	Gamesheet

Complexo Municipal de Atletismo, Setúbal
Attendance: 1,500
Referee: (Romania) Vlad Iordăchescu

3 March 2018
15:00 CET (UTC+01)

(1 TBP) Netherlands	71–30	Poland
	Gamesheet

NRCA Stadium, Amsterdam
Attendance: 4,000
Referee: (France) Ludovic Cayre

10 March 2018
13:15 EET (UTC+02)

Moldova	10–29	Portugal
	Gamesheet

Stadionul Raional, Anenii Noi
Attendance: 350
Referee: (Georgia (country)) Shoda Tevzadze

10 March 2018
14:00 CET (UTC+01)

Czech Republic	17–13	Switzerland (1 LBP)
	Gamesheet

Stadion Markéta, Prague
Attendance: 800
Referee: (Romania) Vlad Iordăchescu

17 March 2018
15:00 CET (UTC+01)

Switzerland	30–24	Poland (1 LBP)
	Gamesheet

Stade des Cherpines, Plan-les-Ouates
Attendance: 800
Referee: (Italy) Andrea Piardi

17 March 2018
15:00 CET (UTC+01)

(1 TBP) Netherlands	27–10	Czech Republic
	Gamesheet

NRCA Stadium, Amsterdam
Attendance: 2,500
Referee: (Belgium) Maxime Burlet

24 March 2018
18:00 CET (UTC+01)

(1 LBP) Poland	25–27	Portugal
	Gamesheet

Stadion Widzewa, Łódź
Attendance: 600
Referee: (Wales) Dan Jones

21 April 2018
14:00 CEST (UTC+02)

Czech Republic	35–21	Moldova
	Gamesheet

Stadion Markéta, Prague
Attendance: 600
Referee: (Scotland) Finlay Brown

== 2017–18 Rugby Europe Conference ==
=== Conference 1 ===
==== Conference 1 North ====
Champions and advances to
Promotion play-off
Relegated

Pos.	Team	Games				Points			TBP	LBP	GS	Table points
Pos.	Team	Played	Won	Drawn	Lost	For	Against	Diff	TBP	LBP	GS	Table points
1	Lithuania	4	4	0	0	127	78	+49	2	0	1	19
2	Ukraine	4	2	1	1	92	63	+79	2	0	0	12
3	Sweden	4	2	0	2	92	109	−17	1	0	0	9
4	Hungary	4	0	1	3	60	72	−12	0	3	0	5
5	Latvia	4	1	0	3	72	121	−49	0	0	0	4
Points were awarded to the teams as follows: Win – 4 points : Draw – 2 points : Loss within 7 points – 1 point : Loss greater than 7 points – 0 points: At least 3 more tries than opponent- 1 point Completing a Grand Slam – 1 point (will not be counted towards World Cup Qualification)

Matches

14 October 2017
15:00 CEST (UTC+02)

Sweden	12–10	Hungary (1 LBP)
	Gamesheet

Bollspelaren, Norrköping
Attendance: 650
Referee: (Belgium) Philippe Lenne

21 October 2017
12:00 CEST (UTC+02)

(1 LBP) Hungary	6–12	Latvia
	Gamesheet

Frankarénában, Esztergom
Attendance: 300
Referee: (Czech Republic) Tomáš Tuma

28 October 2017
14:00 EEST (UTC+03)

(1 TBP) Ukraine	29–8	Sweden
	Gamesheet

Spartak Stadium, Odesa
Attendance: 1,500
Referee: (Romania) Ionuț Bodea

28 November 2017
15:00 EET (UTC+02)

Latvia	19–33	Lithuania (1 TBP)
	Gamesheet

Zemgale Olympic Center, Jelgava
Attendance: 500
Referee: (Germany) Dan Maughan

4 November 2017
14:00 EET (UTC+02)

Lithuania	22–12	Ukraine
	Gamesheet

Aukstaitijos Sporto Kompleksas, Panevėžys
Attendance: 500
Referee: (Germany) Killian O'Brien

21 April 2018
12:00 CEST (UTC+02)

(1 LBP) Hungary	25–29	Lithuania
	Gamesheet

Városi Szabadidő Központ, Százhalombatta
Attendance: 400
Referee: (Italy) Claudio Blessano

28 April 2018
15:00 EEST (UTC+03)

(1 TBP) Lithuania	43–22	Sweden
	Gamesheet

Telšių Miesto Stadionas, Telšiai
Attendance: 2,500
Referee: (Russia) Alexei Bryzgalin

28 April 2018
16:00 EEST (UTC+03)

Ukraine	19–19	Hungary
	Gamesheet

Yunist' Stadium, Lviv
Attendance: 300
Referee: (Italy) Matteo Liperini

5 May 2018
15:00 EEST (UTC+03)

Latvia	14–32	Ukraine (1 TBP)
	Gamesheet

Upesciema Stadions, Upesciems
Attendance: n.a.
Referee: (Croatia) Hrvoje Bartolic

12 May 2018
15:00 CEST (UTC+02)

(1 TBP) Sweden	50–27	Latvia
	Gamesheet

Enköpings RK, Enköping
Attendance: 500
Referee: (Switzerland) Yann Benoît

==== Conference 1 South ====
Champions and advances to
Promotion play-off
Relegated

Pos.	Team	Games				Points			TBP	LBP	GS	Table points
Pos.	Team	Played	Won	Drawn	Lost	For	Against	Diff	TBP	LBP	GS	Table points
1	Malta	4	4	0	0	221	48	+173	3	0	1	20
2	Croatia	4	2	1	1	85	97	−12	1	0	0	11
3	Israel	4	2	0	2	105	86	+19	1	1	0	10
4	Bosnia and Herzegovina	4	1	0	3	54	140	−86	0	0	0	4
5	Andorra	4	0	1	3	60	154	−94	0	2	0	4
Points were awarded to the teams as follows: Win – 4 points : Draw – 2 points : Loss within 7 points – 1 point : Loss greater than 7 points – 0 points: At least 3 more tries than opponent- 1 point Completing a Grand Slam – 1 point (will not be counted towards World Cup Qualification)

Matches

21 October 2017
18:00 CEST (UTC+02)

(1 LBP) Andorra	22–27	Israel
	Gamesheet

Estadi Nacional, Andorra la Vella
Attendance: 600
Referee: (Switzerland) Yann Benoit

28 October 2017
15:00 CEST (UTC+02)

Croatia	32–17	Israel
	Gamesheet

Stari Plac Stadion, Split
Attendance: 600
Referee: (Italy) Matteo Liperini

28 October 2017
15:00 CEST (UTC+02)

Bosnia and Herzegovina	20–52	Malta (1 TBP)
	Gamesheet

Atletski Stadion, Zenica
Attendance: n.a.
Referee: (Czech Republic) Stepan Cekal

4 November 2017
15:00 CET (UTC+01)

(1 TBP) Malta	56–8	Croatia
	Gamesheet

Hibernians Stadium, Paola
Attendance: 3,000
Referee: (France) François Bouzac

11 November 2017
15:00 IST (UTC+02)

(1 TBP) Israel	44–8	Bosnia and Herzegovina
	Gamesheet

Wingate Institute, Netanya
Attendance: 1,400
Referee: (Belgium) John Catteau

17 March 2018
15:00 IST (UTC+02)

(1 LBP) Israel	17–24	Malta
	Gamesheet

Wingate Institute, Netanya
Attendance: 500
Referee: (Spain) Jorge Mopeceres

17 March 2018
15:00 CET (UTC+01)

Bosnia and Herzegovina	20–17	Andorra (1 LBP)
	Gamesheet

Arena Zenica, Zenica
Attendance: 500
Referee: (Romania) Cristian Șerban

24 March 2018
15:00 CET (UTC+01)

(1 TBP) Malta	89–3	Andorra
	Gamesheet

Hibernians Stadium, Paola
Attendance: 1,500
Referee: (Czech Republic) Matej Razga

28 April 2018
18:30 CEST (UTC+02)

Croatia	27–6	Bosnia and Herzegovina
	Gamesheet

Stadion NŠC Stjepan Spajić, Zagreb
Attendance: 1,000
Referee: (Ireland) Mark Patton

5 May 2018
15:00 CEST (UTC+02)

Andorra	18–18	Croatia
	Gamesheet

Estadi Nacional, Andorra la Vella
Attendance: 500
Referee: (Belgium) Philippe Lenne

=== Conference 2 ===
==== Conference 2 North ====
Champions and Promoted
Relegated

Pos.	Team	Games				Points			TBP	LBP	GS	Table points
Pos.	Team	Played	Won	Drawn	Lost	For	Against	Diff	TBP	LBP	GS	Table points
1	Luxembourg	4	4	0	0	162	24	+138	2	0	1	19
2	Denmark	4	3	0	1	211	45	+166	2	0	0	14
3	Finland	4	2	0	2	107	120	−13	1	0	0	9
4	Norway	4	1	0	3	83	90	−7	1	1	0	6
5	Estonia	4	0	0	4	31	315	−284	0	0	0	0
Points were awarded to the teams as follows: Win – 4 points : Draw – 2 points : Loss within 7 points – 1 point : Loss greater than 7 points – 0 points: At least 3 more tries than opponent- 1 point Completing a Grand Slam – 1 point (will not be counted towards World Cup Qualification)

Matches

14 October 2017
18:00 CEST (UTC+02)

Denmark	3–18	Luxembourg
	Gamesheet

Atletikstadion, Odense
Attendance: 1,000
Referee: (Sweden) Rami Aro

14 October 2017
15:00 EEST (UTC+03)

Finland	15–8	Norway (1 LBP)
	Gamesheet

Myllypuron urheilupuisto, Helsinki
Attendance: 250
Referee: (Spain) Alhambra Nievas

28 October 2017
15:00 CEST (UTC+02)

Norway	12–24	Denmark
	Gamesheet

Bislett Stadium, Oslo
Attendance: 1,500
Referee: (Ireland) Joy Neville

11 November 2017
14:00 CET (UTC+01)

(1 TBP) Luxembourg	64–0	Estonia
	Gamesheet

Stade Josy Barthel, Luxembourg City
Attendance: 600
Referee: (Denmark) Michael Hawkins

14 April 2018
16:00 CEST (UTC+02)

(1 TBP) Luxembourg	45–5	Finland
	Gamesheet

Stade Josy Barthel, Luxembourg City
Attendance: 1,300
Referee: (Netherlands) Gert Visser

28 April 2018
15:00 CEST (UTC+02)

(1 TBP) Denmark	127–5	Estonia
	Gamesheet

Atletikstadion, Odense
Attendance: 200
Referee: (Scotland) Finlay Brown

28 April 2018
18:00 CEST (UTC+02)

Luxembourg	35–17	Norway
	Gamesheet

Stade Josy Barthel, Luxembourg City
Attendance: 1,000
Referee: (Germany) Dan Maughan

12 May 2018
15:00 EEST (UTC+03)

Finland	10–57	Denmark (1 TBP)
	Gamesheet

Myllypuron urheilupuisto, Helsinki
Attendance: 250
Referee: (Poland) Lukasz Jasinski

12 May 2018
15:00 EEST (UTC+03)

Estonia	16–47	Norway (1 TBP)
	Gamesheet

Tamme Staadion, Tartu
Attendance: 100
Referee: (Lithuania) Ramunas Grumbinas

9 June 2018
15:00 EEST (UTC+03)

Estonia	10–77	Finland (1 TBP)
	Gamesheet

Tamme Staadion, Tartu
Attendance: 100
Referee: (Russia) Arthur Kaptyukh

==== Conference 2 South ====
Champions and Promoted

Pos.	Team	Games				Points			TBP	LBP	GS	Table points
Pos.	Team	Played	Won	Drawn	Lost	For	Against	Diff	TBP	LBP	GS	Table points
1	Cyprus	4	3	0	1	114	51	+63	2	0	0	14
2	Austria	4	3	0	1	110	85	+25	1	0	0	13
3	Serbia	4	2	0	2	131	98	+33	1	1	0	10
4	Slovenia	4	2	0	2	82	75	+7	0	1	0	9
5	Slovakia	4	0	0	4	45	173	−128	0	0	0	0
Points were awarded to the teams as follows: Win – 4 points : Draw – 2 points : Loss within 7 points – 1 point : Loss greater than 7 points – 0 points: At least 3 more tries than opponent- 1 point Completing a Grand Slam – 1 point (will not be counted towards World Cup Qualification)

Matches

21 October 2017
15:00 CEST (UTC+02)

Austria	27–25	Serbia (1 LBP)
	Gamesheet

Wiener Sportclub-Platz, Wien
Attendance: 1170
Referee: (Hungary) Csaba Priskin

28 October 2017
15:00 CEST (UTC+02)

Serbia	21–30	Slovenia
	Gamesheet

Stadion Borca, Starčevo
Attendance: 450
Referee: (Poland) Lukasz Jasinski

4 November 2017
15:00 CET (UTC+01)

Slovenia	29–15	Slovakia
	Gamesheet

Stadion park Šiška, Ljubljana
Attendance: 600
Referee: (Croatia) Hrvoje Bartolić

11 November 2017
15:00 EET (UTC+02)

(1 TBP) Cyprus	42–5	Austria
	Gamesheet

Stelios Kyriakides Stadium, Paphos
Attendance: 1,000
Referee: (Israel) Ariel Cabral

25 November 2017
15:00 CET (UTC+01)

Slovakia	6–38	Cyprus (1TBP)
	Gamesheet

Štadión PFK, Piešťany
Attendance: 300
Referee: (Belgium) Nicolas Vandecauter

24 March 2018
15:00 CET (UTC+01)

(1 TBP) Austria	56–0	Slovakia
	Gamesheet

Wiener Sportclub-Platz, Wien
Attendance: 800
Referee: (Portugal) Afonso Noguiera

24 March 2018
15:00 EET (UTC+02)

Cyprus	17–5	Slovenia
	Gamesheet

Stelios Kyriakides Stadium, Paphos
Attendance: n.a.
Referee: (Czech Republic) Tomáš Tuma

7 April 2018
15:00 CEST (UTC+02)

(1 LBP) Slovenia	8–22	Austria
	Gamesheet

Stadion park Šiška, Ljubljana
Attendance: 225
Referee: (Georgia (country)) Nika Amashukeli

21 April 2018
14:00 CEST (UTC+02)

Slovakia	24–50	Serbia (1 TBP)
	Gamesheet

Štadión PFK, Piešťany
Attendance: 250
Referee: (Scotland) David Sutherland

28 April 2018
14:00 CEST (UTC+02)

Serbia	35–17	Cyprus
	Gamesheet

Stadion NC Makiš, Beograd
Attendance: 300
Referee: (Portugal) Pedro Mendes Silva

== 2018 Rugby Europe Development ==
Champions and Promoted

Pos.	Team	Games				Points			TBP	LBP	GS	Table points
Pos.	Team	Played	Won	Drawn	Lost	For	Against	Diff	TBP	LBP	GS	Table points
1	Bulgaria	2	2	0	0	96	25	+71	1	0	0	9
2	Turkey	2	1	0	1	38	47	−9	0	0	0	4
3	Montenegro	2	0	0	2	8	70	−62	0	1	0	1
Points were awarded to the teams as follows: Win – 4 points : Draw – 2 points : Loss within 7 points – 1 point : Loss greater than 7 points – 0 points: At least 3 more tries than opponent- 1 point Completing a Grand Slam – 1 point (will not be counted towards World Cup Qualification)

Matches

14 April 2018
12:00 CEST (UTC+02)

Montenegro	0–57	Bulgaria (1 TBP)
	Gamesheet

Stadion kraj Bistrice, Nikšić
Attendance: 200
Referee: (Sweden) Rami Aro

28 April 2018
16:00 TRT (UTC+03)

Turkey	13–8	Montenegro (1 LBP)
	Gamesheet

Maltepe Hasan Polat Stadyumu, Istanbul
Attendance: 300
Referee: (Romania) Alexandru Ionescu

5 May 2018
15:00 EEST (UTC+03)

Bulgaria	39–25	Turkey
	Gamesheet

NSA Vassil Levski, Sofia
Attendance: 600
Referee: (Serbia) Dejan Stiglic

== Play-offs ==
=== Championship-Trophy Promotion play-off ===
10 November 2018
14:00 EET (UTC+02)

Romania	36–6	Portugal
	Gamesheet

Stadionul Lascăr Ghineț (Arena Zimbrilor), Baia Mare
Attendance: 3,000
Referee: (England) Ian Tempest

=== Conference 1 promotion to Trophy play-off ===
19 May 2018
14:00 EEST (UTC+03)

Lithuania	81–10	Malta
	Gamesheet

Šiaulių savivaldybės stadionas, Šiauliai
Attendance: 1,500
Referee: (France) Rémy Charleroy

== See also ==
- 2019 Rugby World Cup – Europe qualification
