= 2018–19 Rugby Europe Trophy =

2018-19 Rugby Europe Trophy
- Date: 28 September 2018 – 14 April 2019
- Countries: Czech Republic; Lithuania; Netherlands; Poland; Portugal; Switzerland

Tournament statistics
- Champions: Portugal (3rd title)
- Grand Slam: Portugal (3)
- Matches played: 14
- Attendance: 29,521 (2,109 per match)
- Tries scored: 94 (6.71 per match)
- Top point scorer(s): (Portugal) Jorge Abecassis (49)
- Top try scorer(s): (Portugal) João Belo (5) (Portugal) Rodrigo Marta (5)
- Official website: 2018-19 Rugby Europe International Championships

The 2018–19 Rugby Europe Trophy is the second-level rugby union competition below the premier Championship. It is the third Trophy competition under its new format, that will see Czech Republic, Lithuania, Netherlands, Poland, and Switzerland compete for the title, and a place in the Championship-Trophy promotion play-off.

This year's competition sees Lithuania joining the Trophy after winning the Trophy-Conference 1 promotion play-off against Malta. After the Championship-Trophy promotion play-off of the 2017-18 season, which was played on 3 November 2018 between Portugal and Romania after the eligibility case of the 2018 Rugby Europe Championship, Portugal remained on the Trophy level and lost the relegation play-off for the second year in a row.

== Table ==
Champions and advances to
Promotion/relegation play-off
Relegated

Place	Nation	Games				Points			Try BP	Losing BP	Grand Slam BP	Table points
Place	Nation	played	won	drawn	lost	for	against	diff	Try BP	Losing BP	Grand Slam BP	Table points
1	Portugal	5	5	0	0	272	31	+241	4	0	1	25
2	Netherlands	5	4	0	1	164	58	+106	2	0	0	18
3	Switzerland	5	3	0	2	108	138	−20	0	0	0	12
4	Poland	5	2	0	3	104	164	-60	1	1	0	10
5	Lithuania	5	1	0	4	63	175	−112	1	0	0	5
6	Czech Republic	5	0	0	5	59	205	−146	0	1	0	1
Pre-Tournament rankings in parentheses. Points were awarded to the teams as follows: Win - 4 points | Draw - 2 points | Loss - 0 points Match bonus points: Scoring at least 3 more tries than the opponent - 1 point | Losing by 7 points or less - 1 point | Overall bonus point: Completing a Grand Slam (winning all matches) - 1 point

== Fixtures ==
29 September 2018
16:00 CEST (UTC+02)

Czech Republic	22-41	Poland
Try: Dan Hošek 37', 41'; Tomáš Forst 73'; Con: Tomáš Forst 38'; Jiří Pantůček 74'; Pen: Jiří Pantůček 51'	Gamesheet	Try: Piotr Zeszutek 11', 30'; Michał Jurczyński 24'; Daniel Gdula 55'; Stanisław Powała-Niedżwieck 78'; Con: Mateusz Adamski 12', 25', 31'; Wojciech Piotrowicz 56', 79'; Pen: Mateusz Adamski 8'; Wojciech Piotrowicz 54'

Stadion Mládeže, Zlín
Attendance: 500
Referee: (Ireland) Stuart Gaffikin

FB	15	Martin Kovář
RW	14	Tomáš Forst
OC	13	Jiří Pantůček
IC	12	Karel Berounský
LW	11	Daniel Stárka	(substituted off) 57'
FH	10	Albert Froněk	(substituted off) 71'
SH	9	Matyáš Hopp	(substituted off) 52'
N8	8	Dan Hošek
OF	7	James Faktor
BF	6	Vojtěch Havel
RL	5	Jiří Frank	(substituted off) 65'
LL	4	Robert Trefný	(substituted off) 71'
TP	3	Martin Havlíček	(substituted off) 71'
HK	2	Matouš Hodek	(substituted off) 71'
LP	1	Anthony Kent	(substituted off) 71'
Replacements:
	16	Adam Leitmančik	(substituted on) 71'
	17	Michal Průša	(substituted on) 71'
	18	Štěpán Pekař	(substituted on) 71'
	19	Jan Olbrich	(substituted on) 71'
	20	Radim Hutník	(substituted on) 65'
	21	Zbyněk Schütz	(substituted on) 52'
	22	Jakub Čížek	(substituted on) 71'
	23	František Ševčík	(substituted on) 57'
Coach:
Phil Pretorius

FB	15	Krystian Pogorzelski		(substituted off) 41'
RW	14	Andrzej Charlat
OC	13	Michał Jurczyński
IC	12	Daniel Gdula
LW	11	Grzegorz Szczepański	(substituted off) 36'	(substituted on) 44'
FH	10	Mateusz Adamski		(substituted off) 79'
SH	9	Mateusz Plichta
N8	8	Piotr Zeszutek
OF	7	Lawrie Seydak
BF	6	Piotr Wiśniewski		(substituted off) 66'
RL	5	Stanisław Powała-Niedżwieck
LL	4	Adam Piotrowski		(substituted off) 77'
TP	3	Robizon Kelberashvili		(substituted off) 44'
HK	2	Adrian Chróściel
LP	1	Kamil Bobryk	(yellow card) 35'	(substituted off) 77'
Replacements:
	16	Michał Gadomski	(substituted on) 36'	(substituted off) 44'	(substituted on) 77'
	17	Radosław Bysewski		(substituted on) 44'
	18	Wojciech Król		(substituted on) 77'
	19	Marek Mirosz		(substituted on) 66'
	20	Artur Fursenko
	21	Wojciech Piotrowicz		(substituted on) 41'
	22	Maciej Grabowski		(substituted on) 79'
	23	Sebastian Kostałkwoski
Coach:
Duaine Lindsay

Man of the Match:

Touch judges:
(Ireland) Oisin Quinn
(Ireland) Daniel Carson
Television Match Official

Notes:

13 October 2018
14:00 EEST (UTC+03)

(1 TBP) Lithuania	30–10	Czech Republic
	Gamesheet

Šiaulių savivaldybės stadionas, Šiauliai
Attendance: 1,000
Referee: (Portugal) Pedro Mendes Silva

FB	15	Dainius Tamoliūnas
RW	14	Domantas Bagužis
OC	13	Mantautas Vilimavičius
IC	12	Donatas Vilimavičius
LW	11	Matas Miežys
FH	10	Tautvydas Krasauskas
SH	9	Tomas Bagdonas
N8	8	Žygimantas Radžius
OF	7	Justinas Urbonas
BF	6	Paulius Stingūnas
RL	5	Karolis Navickas	(yellow card) 29'
LL	4	Darius Vaitkevičius
TP	3	Modestas Bekeris
HK	2	Tomas Zibolis
LP	1	Tautvydas Mažylis
Replacements:
	16	Donatas Trumpickas
	17	Sigitas Čiakas
	18	Vaidas Kizilaitis
	19	Airidas Savickas
	20	Deividas Vorašilka
	21	Aurimas Streckis
	22	Kęstutis Karbauskas
	23	Daivaras Jonaitis
Coach:
Ntando Manyosha

FB	15	Jakub Čížek
RW	14	Michal Neužil
OC	13	Jan Tieber
IC	12	Karel Berounský
LW	11	František Ševčík
FH	10	Albert Froněk
SH	9	Zbyněk Schütz
N8	8	Dan Hošek
OF	7	Radim Hutník
BF	6	Vojtěch Havel
RL	5	Lukáš Chytil
LL	4	Robert Trefný
TP	3	Martin Havlíček
HK	2	Matouš Hodek
LP	1	Anthony Kent
Replacements:
	16	Adam Leitmančik
	17	Michal Průša
	18	Štěpán Pekař
	19	Václav Monček
	20	Petr Máslo
	21	Matyáš Hopp
	22	Ali Samet
	23	Žemlička Jaroslav
Coach:
Phil Pretorius

Man of the Match:

Touch judges:
(Portugal) José Termudo
(Portugal) Fernando Mendes
Television Match Official

Notes:

3 November 2018
18:00 CET (UTC+01)

(1 TBP) Poland	33–0	Lithuania
	Gamesheet

Stadion Miejski, Łódź
Attendance: 2,155
Referee: (Italy) Gianluca Gnecchi

17 November 2018
15:00 CET (UTC+01)

Switzerland	17–5	Czech Republic
	Gamesheet

Stade Municipal, Yverdon-les-Bains
Attendance: 2,000
Referee: (Belgium) Maxime Burlet

17 November 2018
18:00 CET (UTC+01)

Poland	0–49	Netherlands (1 TBP)
	Gamesheet

Arena Lublin, Lublin
Attendance: 4,000
Referee: (Scotland) Keith Allen

24 November 2018
15:00 CET (UTC+01)

Netherlands	36–15	Switzerland
	Gamesheet

NRCA Stadium, Amsterdam
Attendance: 1,400
Referee: (Georgia (country)) Shota Tevzadze

16 February 2019
15:00 WET (UTC+00)

(1 TBP) Portugal	65–5	Poland
Try: Jean Sousa 25'; João Belo 35'; Salvador Vassalo 54', 80+3'; Manuel Marta 60'; Rodrigo Marta 67', 73'; António Cortes 75'; Con: Jorge Abecassis 26', 68', 74', 76', 80+4'; Pen: Jorge Abecassis 5', 10', 20', 24', 33'	WR Report; Gamesheet	Try: Dawid Plitcha 63'

Complexo Municipal de Atletismo, Setúbal
Referee: (Italy) Manuel Bottino

FB	15	Manuel Marta		(substituted off) 69'
RW	14	Rodrigo Marta
OC	13	Rodrigo Freudenthal
IC	12	Tomás Appleton		(substituted off) 58'
LW	11	António Cortes
FH	10	Jorge Abecassis
SH	9	João Belo	(substituted off) 54'	(substituted on) 65'	(substituted off) 71'
N8	8	Vasco Baptista
OF	7	Salvador Vassalo
BF	6	João Granate
RL	5	Jean Sousa	(yellow card) 50'	(substituted off) 60'
LL	4	José D'alte		(substituted off) 65'
TP	3	Diogo Hasse Ferriera
HK	2	Nuno Mascarenhas		(substituted off) 51'
LP	1	João Corte-Real	(substituted off) 51'	(substituted on) 69'
Replacements:
	16	Bruno Rocha		(substituted on) 51'
	17	Duarte Diniz		(substituted on) 51'
	18	José Andrade	(substituted on) 60'	(substituted off) 65'
	19	Sebastião Villax
	20	Martim Cardoso	(substituted on) 54'	(substituted off) 65'	(substituted on) 71'
	21	Vasco Ribeiro		(substituted on) 58'
	22	António Marques		(substituted on) 69'
	23	Francisco Bruno		(substituted on) 69'
Coach:
Martim Aguiar

FB	15	Przemysław Rajewski	(substituted off) 37'	(substituted off) 71'
RW	14	Michał Jurczyński
OC	13	Daniel Gdula
IC	12	Kewin Bracik
LW	11	Grzegorz Szczepański
FH	10	Wojciech Piotrowicz
SH	9	Mateusz Plichta
N8	8	Piotr Zeszutek	(yellow card) 50'
OF	7	Aleksander Nowicki
BF	6	Piotr Wiśniewski		(substituted off) 49'
RL	5	Mateusz Bartoszek
LL	4	Ronan Seydak
TP	3	Radosław Bysewski		(substituted off) 52'
HK	2	Grzegorz Buczek		(substituted off) 61'
LP	1	Michał Gadomski		(substituted off) 23'
Replacements:
	16	Adrian Potrykus		(substituted on) 49'
	25	Adrian Chróściel		(substituted on) 23'	(yellow card) 49'
	18	Hugo Mazur
	19	Kostiantyn Bezverkhyi		(substituted on) 61'
	20	Adrian Niemiee
	21	Dawid Plitcha		(substituted on) 37'
	22	Artur Fursenko		(substituted on) 71'
	23	Robizon Kelberashvili		(substituted on) 52'
Coach:
Duaine Lindsay

Man of the Match:

Touch judges:
(Italy) Gabriel Chirnoaga
(Italy) Filippo Bertelli
Television Match Official

Notes:

9 March 2019
13:15 CET (UTC+01)

Netherlands	5–18	Portugal
	Gamesheet

NRCA Stadium, Amsterdam
Attendance: 7,000
Referee: (Belgium) Maxime Burlet

16 March 2019
15:00 CET (UTC+01)

Switzerland	14–48	Portugal (1 TBP)
	Gamesheet

Centre sportif de Colovray, Nyon
Attendance: 2,107
Referee: (Spain) Inigo Atorrasagasti

16 March 2019
14:00 CET (UTC+01)

Czech Republic	22–24	Netherlands
	Gamesheet

Tarta Arena, Smíchov
Attendance: 850
Referee: (Portugal) Paolo Duarte

23 March 2019
15:00 WET (UTC+00)

Portugal (1 TBP)	93–0	Czech Republic
	Gamesheet

Complexo Desportivo, Caldas da Rainha
Attendance: n.a.
Referee: (France) Tual Trainini

23 March 2019
15:00 CET (UTC+01)

Poland (1 LBP)	25–28	Switzerland
	Gamesheet

Stadion Miejski, Łódź
Attendance: 2,500
Referee: (Romania) Vlad Iordăchescu

6 April 2019
14:00 EEST (UTC+03)

Lithuania	7–48	Portugal (1 TBP)
	Gamesheet

Sporto centras, Jurbarkas
Attendance: 1,700
Referee: (France) Jonathan Dufort

13 April 2019
15:00 CEST (UTC+02)

Switzerland	34–24	Lithuania
	Gamesheet

Stadion Breite, Schaffhausen
Attendance: 1,309
Referee: (Wales) Alad Evans

8 June 2019
17:00 EEST (UTC+03)

Lithuania	3–50	Netherlands
	Gamesheet

Panevėžio kūno kultūros ir sporto centras, Panevėžys
Attendance: n/a
Referee: (Republic of Ireland) Jonathan Erskine

== Relegation/Promotion play-off ==
15 June 2019
13:50 CET (UTC+01)

Germany	32-37	Portugal
	Gamesheet

Frankfurt
Attendance: 800
Referee: (Ireland) Sean Gallagher

== Top scorers ==
=== Top points scorers ===
Pos	Name	Team	Pts
1	Jorge Abecassis	Portugal	49
2	Simon Perrod	Switzerland	39
3	Rodrigo Marta	Portugal	34
4	João Belo	Portugal	25
4	Rodrigo Marta	Portugal	25
4	Wojciech Piotrowicz	Poland	25

=== Top try scorers ===
Pos	Name	Team	Tries
1	Rodrigo Marta	Portugal	5
1	João Belo	Portugal	5
3	Manuel Marta	Portugal	4
3	Lucas Heinrich	Switzerland	4
5	Domantas Bagužis	Lithuania	3
5	Caetano Branco	Portugal	3
5	António Vidinha	Portugal	3
5	Piotr Zeszutek	Poland	3
5	Josh Gascoigne	Netherlands	3
5	Amir Rademaker	Netherlands	3
5	Wolf van Dijk	Netherlands	3

== See also ==
- Rugby Europe International Championships
- 2018–19 Rugby Europe International Championships
- Six Nations Championship
- Antim Cup
