= Kinikinilau =

Kinikinilau is a surname. Notable people with the surname include:

- Paula Kinikinilau (born 1986), Tongan-born Romanian rugby union player
- Roy Kinikinilau (born 1980), Tongan rugby union player
