= Anzor Sitchinava =

- Born: 9 September 1995 (age 31) Tbilisi, Georgia
- Height: 1.90 m (6 ft 3 in)
- Weight: 93 kg (14 st 9 lb)

Rugby union career
- Position: Wing
Senior career
Years	Team	Apps	(Points)
2015–	Academy Tbilisi	45	(65)
- Correct as of 19/03/2018
International career
Years	Team	Apps	(Points)
2014–2015	Georgia U20	13	(10)
2016–	Georgia	9	(15)
- Correct as of 23 June 2018

Anzor Sitchinava (born 8 September 1995) is a Georgian rugby union player. He plays on the wing, for Academy Tbilisi in the Didi 10 and the Georgia national team.

Sitchinava received a yellow card for tackling a player in the air in his first international match against Japan in 2016. He was selected as part of the 36-man Georgian squad to prepare for the 2018 Rugby Europe Championship.
