= Fonovai Tangimana =

Romania international rugby union player

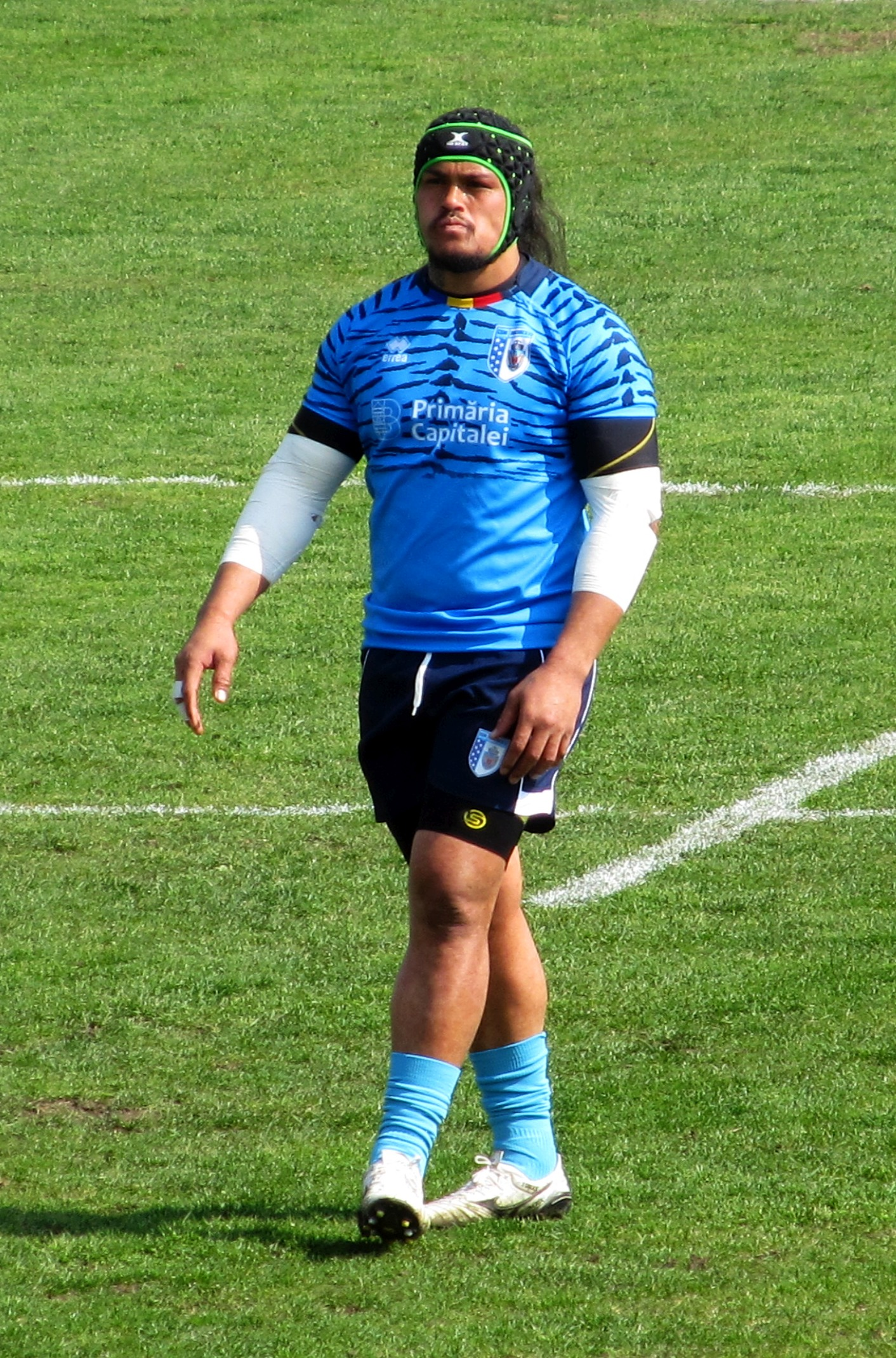
- Fonovai Tangimana playing for CSM București during the 2019 Cupa României Final
- Full name: Fonovai Tangimana
- Born: 25 October 1989 (age 37) Neiafu, Tonga
- Height: 1.88 m (6 ft 2 in)
- Weight: 111 kg (17 st 7 lb; 245 lb)

Rugby union career
- Position(s): Wing; Centre
- Current team: Steaua București
Amateur team(s)
Years	Team	Apps	(Points)
2007–12	Toloa Old Boys College		
Senior career
Years	Team	Apps	(Points)
2012–18	Timișoara Saracens	58	(160)
2018–19	CSM București	15	(25)
2019–Present	Steaua București	3	(10)
- Correct as of 16 April 2020
International career
Years	Team	Apps	(Points)
2016–Present	Romania	17	(20)
- Correct as of 16 April 2020

Fonovai Tangimana (born 25 October 1989) is a Tongan-born Romanian rugby union football player. He plays in the wing position for professional SuperLiga club Steaua București but can also play in the centre position as well. He currently plays for Romania's national team, the Oaks, making his international debut at the autumn tests in 2016 more specifically in a match against the Eagles.
