= Badri Alkhazashvili =

Georgian rugby union player

- Born: 31 July 1995 (age 31) Tbilisi Georgia
- Height: 1.81 m (5 ft 11 in)
- Weight: 107 kg (16 st 12 lb; 236 lb)

Rugby union career
- Position: Hooker
Senior career
Years	Team	Apps	(Points)
2016-2019	Toulon	2	(0)
2019	→Provence (loan)	4	(0)
2019-2020	Lyon	9	(0)
2021-	CA Brive	13	(0)
- Correct as of 17 April 2021
International career
Years	Team	Apps	(Points)
2015–2016	Georgia U20	10	(5)
2016-	Georgia	9	(0)
- Correct as of 19 April 2021

Badri Alkhazashvili (Georgian: ბადრი ალხაზაშვილი; born 31 July 1995) is a Georgian rugby union player. His position is hooker, and he currently plays for Lyon in the Top 14 and the Georgia national rugby union team.
