= Levan Chilachava =

Georgian rugby union player

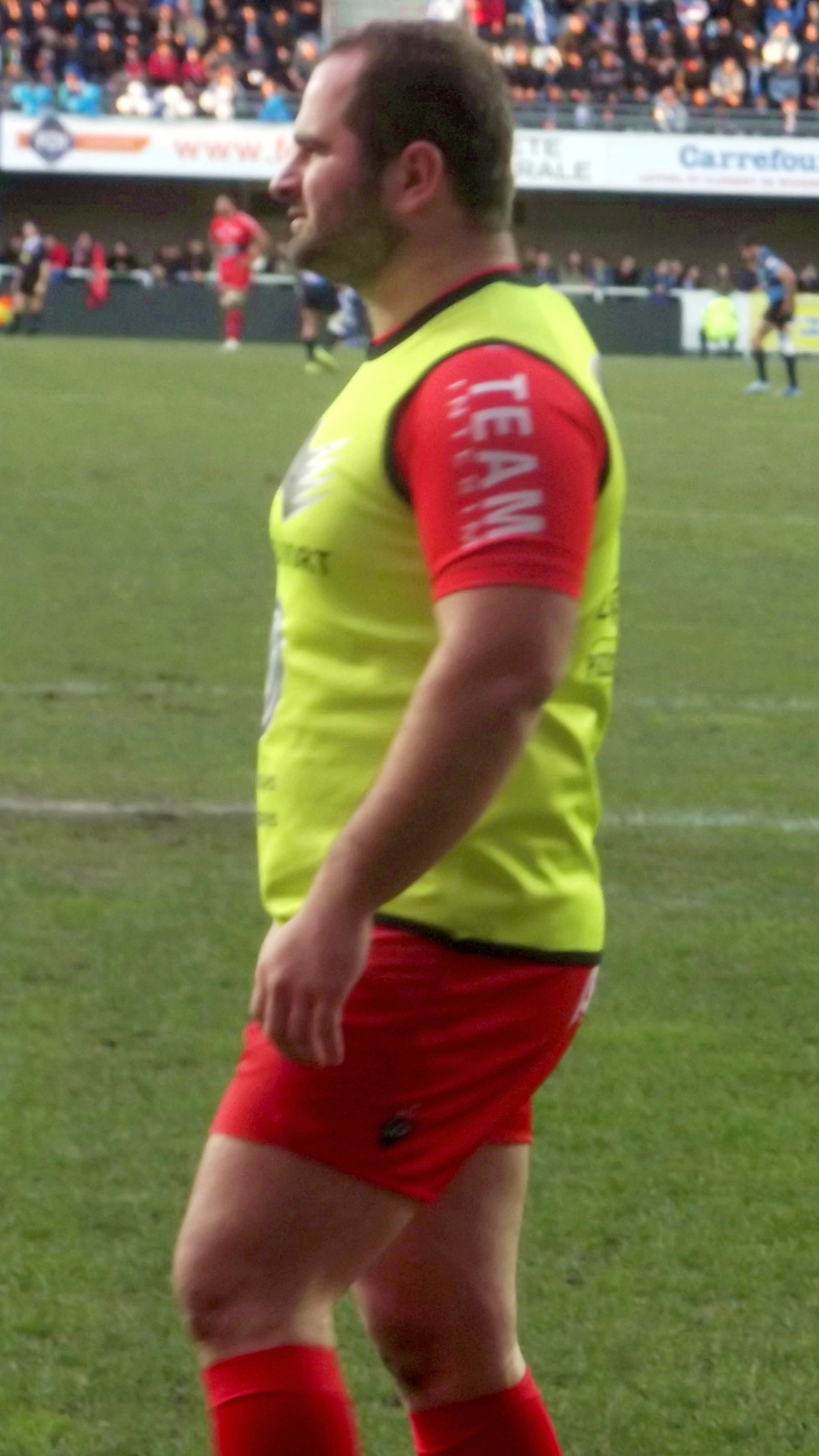
- Born: Levan Chilachava; 17 August 1991 (age 35) Sokhumi, Georgia
- Height: 1.88 m (6 ft 2 in)
- Weight: 128 kg (282 lb; 20 st 2 lb)

Rugby union career
- Position: Prop
- Current team: RC Toulon
Youth career
- until 2009: Universiteti Tbilisi
- 2010-2011: RC Toulon
Senior career
Years	Team	Apps	(Points)
2011-2018	RC Toulon	108	(45)
2018-2020	Montpellier	38	(20)
2020-	Castres Olympique	42	(15)
- Correct as of 26 July 2021
International career
Years	Team	Apps	(Points)
2010-	Georgia	49	(40)
- Correct as of 26 July 2021

Levan Chilachava (Georgian: ლევან ჩილაჩავა) (born 17 August 1991 in Sokhumi, Georgia) is a Georgian rugby union player. He plays prop for Georgia on international level. Chilachava also plays for French club, Toulon in the Top 14 competition.

On the 11 February 2012 Chilachava made his debut for Georgia against Spain in the European Nations Cup. He then was named in Georgia's 2012 end of year tour squad.

== Career statistics ==
As of match played 7 June 2015.

Club	Season	Top 14				Champions Cup				Total			
Club	Season	Apps	Tries	Yel	Red	Apps	Tries	Yel	Red	Apps	Tries	Yel	Red
RC Toulon	2011–12	1	0	0	0	0	0	0	0	1	0	0	0
RC Toulon	2012–13	9	1	0	0	0	0	0	0	9	1	0	0
RC Toulon	2013–14	7	0	0	0	0	0	0	0	7	0	0	0
RC Toulon	2014–15	16	2	0	0	4	0	0	0	20	2	0	0
Career total		33	3	1	0	4	0	0	0	34	3	1	0
