= Mikheil Gachechiladze =

Georgian rugby union player

- Born: 24 December 1990 (age 35) Tbilisi, Georgian SSR, Soviet Union
- Height: 1.91 m (6 ft 3 in)
- Weight: 105 kg (231 lb; 16 st 7 lb)

Rugby union career
- Position: Flanker
- Current team: The Black Lion
Senior career
Years	Team	Apps	(Points)
2012–2014	Hagetmau	30	(0)
2014–2015	Carqueiranne-Hyères	14	(5)
2016–2022	Enisei-STM	88	(125)
2022–	The Black Lion	11	(25)
- Correct as of 12 May 2023
International career
Years	Team	Apps	(Points)
2018–	Georgia	19	(20)
- Correct as of 12 May 2023

Mikheil Gachechiladze (Georgian: მიხეილ გაჩეჩილაძე; born 24 December 1990) is a Georgian professional rugby union player who plays as a flanker for Super Cup club The Black Lion and the Georgia national team.

== Honours ==
- Russian Championships (4): 2017, 2018, 2019, 2020/21
- Russian Cup (2): 2017, 2020
- Russian Supercup: 2017
- Nikolaev Cup (3): 2017, 2018, 2021
- European Rugby Continental Shield (2): 2016–17, 2017–18
