= Ionel Badiu =

Romanian rugby union player

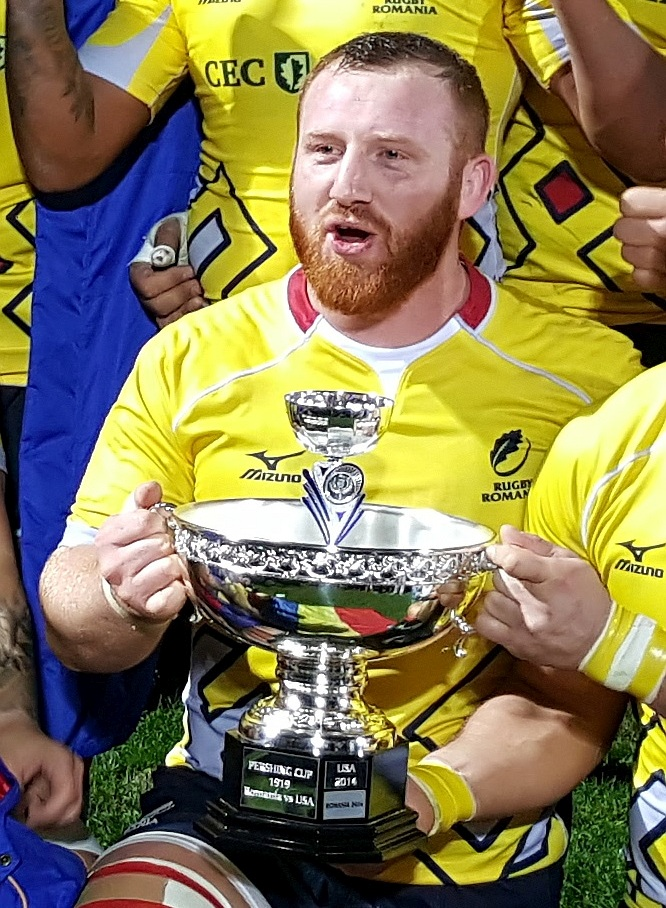
- Ionel Badiu in 2016 holding the Pershing Cup Trophy won against USA
- Full name: Ionel Badiu
- Born: 29 July 1989 (age 37) Vidra, Romania
- Height: 1.85 m (6 ft 1 in)
- Weight: 116 kg (18 st 4 lb; 256 lb)

Rugby union career
- Position: Prop
- Current team: Valence Romans
Senior career
Years	Team	Apps	(Points)
- SC Mazamet
- Farul Constanța
2013–2014	Rodez Aveyron	20	(10)
2014–2017	Carcassonne	31	(0)
2017–2018	SCM Rugby Timișoara	7	(0)
2017–2018	Valence Romans	47	(5)
- Correct as of 25 December 2020
International career
Years	Team	Apps	(Points)
2014–2020	Romania	23	(15)
- Correct as of 25 December 2020

Ionel Badiu (born 29 July 1989) was a Romanian rugby union football player. He played as a prop for professional Rugby Pro D2 club Carcassonne. He also played for the Romania national rugby union team, making his international debut at the 2014 IRB Nations Cup in a match against the Russia national rugby union team.
