= Lasha Lomidze (rugby union, born 1992) =

Georgian rugby union player

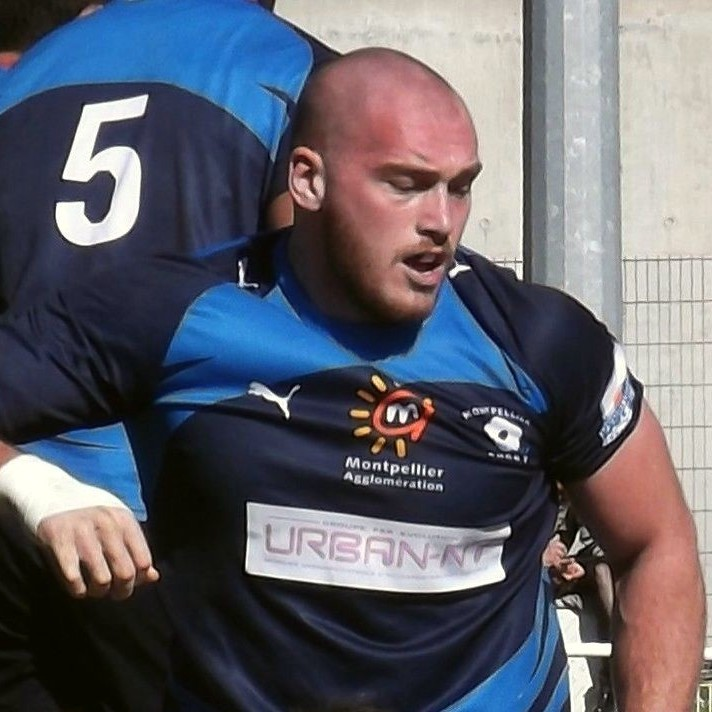
- Born: 30 June 1992 (age 34) Tbilisi, Georgia
- Height: 1.95 m (6 ft 5 in)
- Weight: 110 kg (17 st 5 lb; 240 lb)

Rugby union career
- Position(s): Number 8, Flanker, Lock
Senior career
Years	Team	Apps	(Points)
2012–2014	Montpellier	7	(0)
2014–2017	Béziers	38	(25)
2017-2017	Krasny Yar	5	(0)
2017-2017	London Irish	8	(5)
2018-2019	Aurillac	11	(0)
2019	Doncaster Knights	4	(0)
2019−2020	Lazio	9	(5)
2020−	Dax		
- Correct as of 4 September 2015
International career
Years	Team	Apps	(Points)
2012	Georgia Under 20	3	(5)
2013–	Georgia	46	(20)
- Correct as of 16 September 2019

Lasha Lomidze (born 30 June 1992) is a Georgian rugby union player. His position is number 8, and he currently plays for London Irish in the English Premiership and the Georgia national team.

== Biography ==
Lasha Lomidze was formed in Montpellier. He made no appearances for the first team during his time at the club, but he was a part of Montpellier's Under-23 side that became the champion de France Espoirs in May 2013. During the summer of 2014, he signed for AS Béziers Hérault.

Lasha Lomidze was in the Georgian squad for 2015 Rugby World Cup.

On 1 June 2017, he signed for English Premiership club London Irish.
