= Anton Peikrishvili =

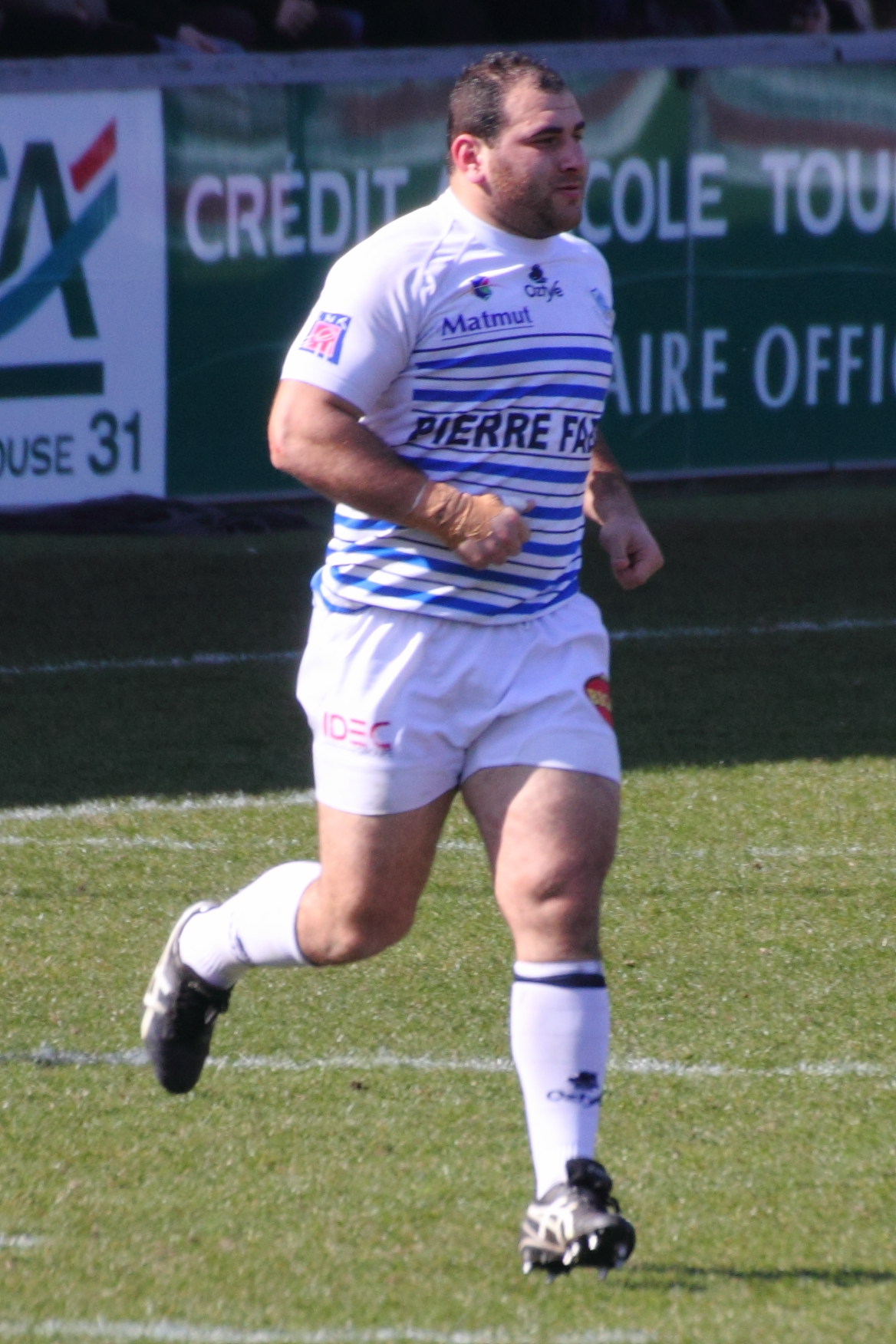
- Image of Anton Peikrishvili
- Born: Anton Peikrishvili; 18 September 1987 (age 39) Tbilisi, Georgia
- Height: 1.83 m (6 ft 0 in)
- Weight: 121 kg (19 st 1 lb)

Rugby union career
- Position: Prop
- Current team: Cardiff Blues
Senior career
Years	Team	Apps	(Points)
2010–2014	Castres	69	(15)
2014–2016	Brive	21	(10)
2016–2016	Ulster	0	(0)
2016-2018	Cardiff Blues	27	(5)
2019-	Aia Kutaisi	0	(0)
- Correct as of 13 Jan 2019
International career
Years	Team	Apps	(Points)
2008–	Georgia	27	(30)
- Correct as of 19 April 2018

Anton Peikrishvili (born 18 September 1987) is a Georgian rugby union player. His position is prop, and he currently plays for Cardiff Blues in the Pro14 and the Georgia national team.
