= Andrei Rădoi =

Romanian rugby player (born 1987)

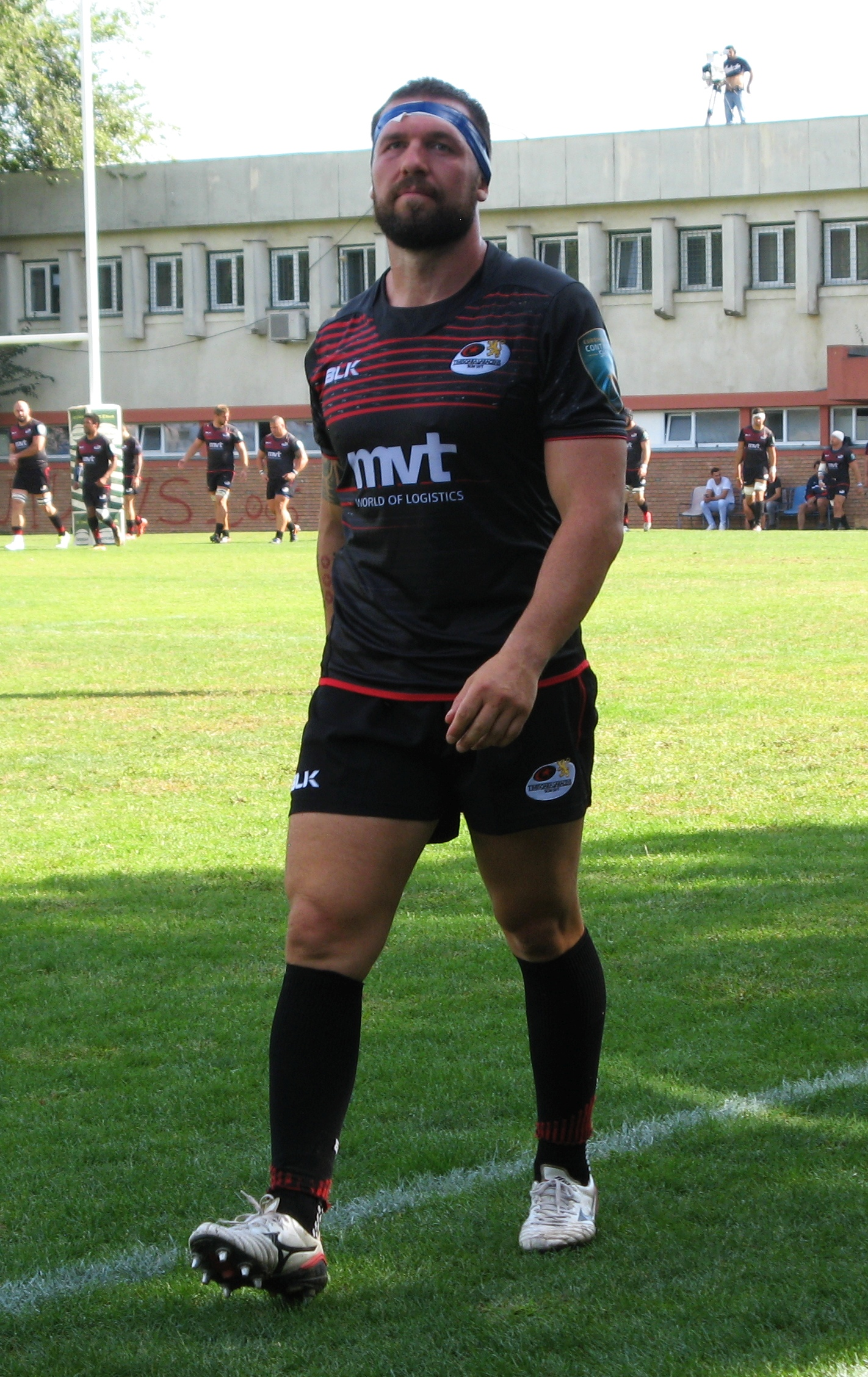
- Rădoi in 2018 during a SuperLiga match
- Born: 7 February 1987 (age 39)
- Height: 1.85 m (6 ft 1 in)
- Weight: 95 kg (14 st 13 lb; 209 lb)

Rugby union career
- Position: Hooker
- Current team: SCM Rugby Timișoara
Senior career
Years	Team	Apps	(Points)
2008–11	București Oaks	11	(0)
2011–14	București Wolves	11	(0)
2014–15	Ealing Trailfinders	27	(10)
- Correct as of 21 May 2016
Provincial / State sides
Years	Team	Apps	(Points)
2013	Baia Mare	11	(5)
2015–	Timișoara Saracens	7	(5)
- Correct as of 21 May 2016
International career
Years	Team	Apps	(Points)
2008–	Romania	70	(56)
- Correct as of 25 November 2017

Andrei Rădoi (born 7 February 1987) is a Romanian rugby union player. He plays in the hooker position for professional Liga Națională de Rugby club SCM Rugby Timișoara and București based European Challenge Cup side the Wolves.

Rădoi also played for Romania's national team the Oaks. Between December 2013 Rădoi plays for Ealing Trailfinders, promoted in April 2015 to the English Championship (level 2).

In 2022 he was given a four-year ban for breaking anti-doping regulations.
