= Ionuț Dumitru =

Romania international rugby union player

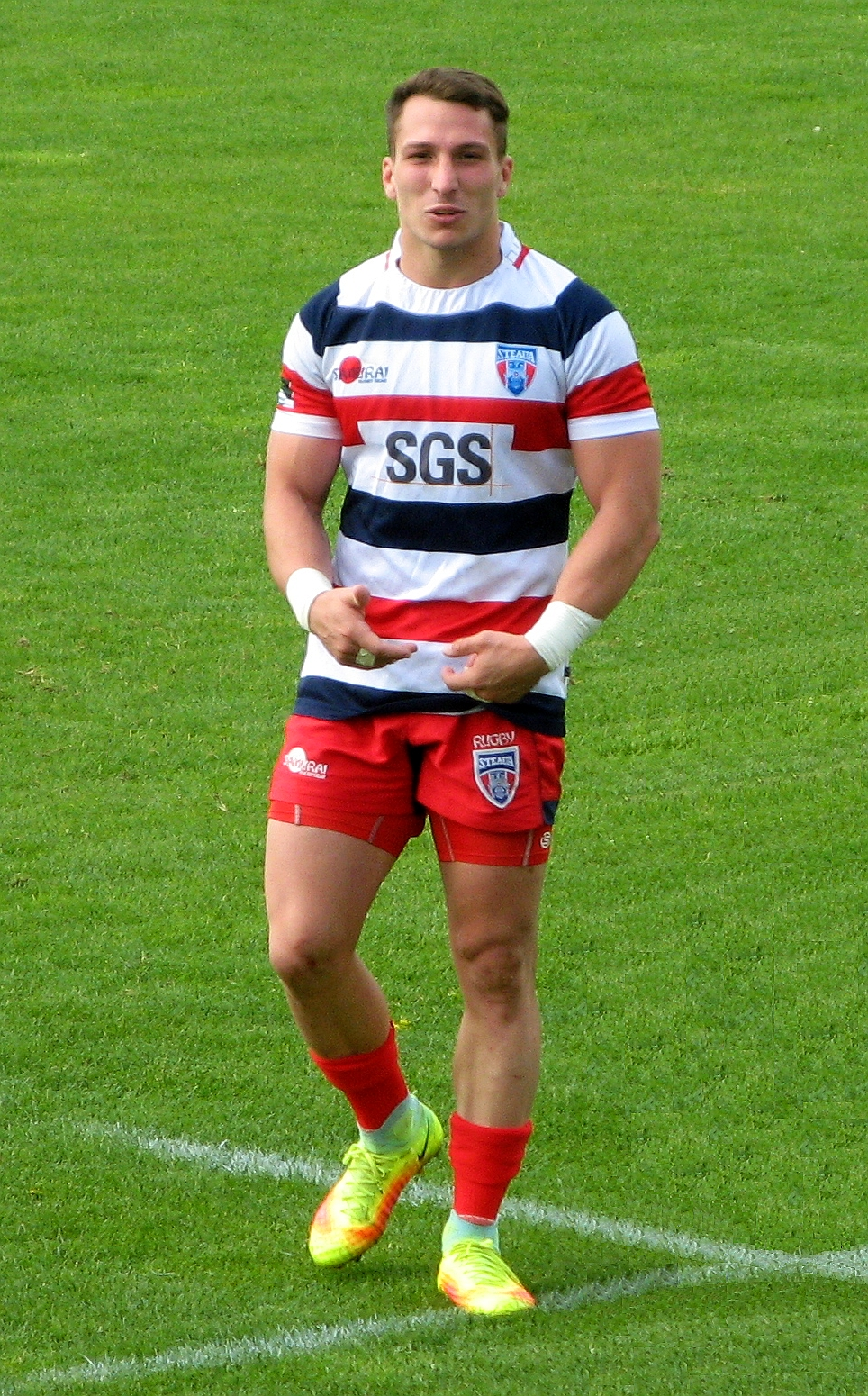
- Melinte representing CSA Steaua in the 2017–18 SuperLiga, April 2017
- Full name: Ionuț Răzvan Dumitru
- Born: 6 November 1992 (age 34) București, Romania
- Height: 176 cm (5 ft 9 in)
- Weight: 79 kg (174 lb; 12 st 6 lb)

Rugby union career
- Position: Fullback
- Current team: CSA Steaua
Senior career
Years	Team	Apps	(Points)
2013–2014	București Wolves	5	(0)
2016–	CSA Steaua	49	(100)
- Correct as of 4 July 2021
International career
Years	Team	Apps	(Points)
2013–2021	Romania	47	(66)
- Correct as of 4 July 2021

Ionuț Răzvan Dumitru (born 6 November 1992) is a Romanian rugby union player. He plays mainly as a wing and occasionally as a centre for professional SuperLiga club Steaua and București based European Challenge Cup side the Wolves. Dumitru also plays for Romania's national team the Oaks.

== Professional career ==
Ionuț Dumitru currently plays for Steaua București.

== International career ==
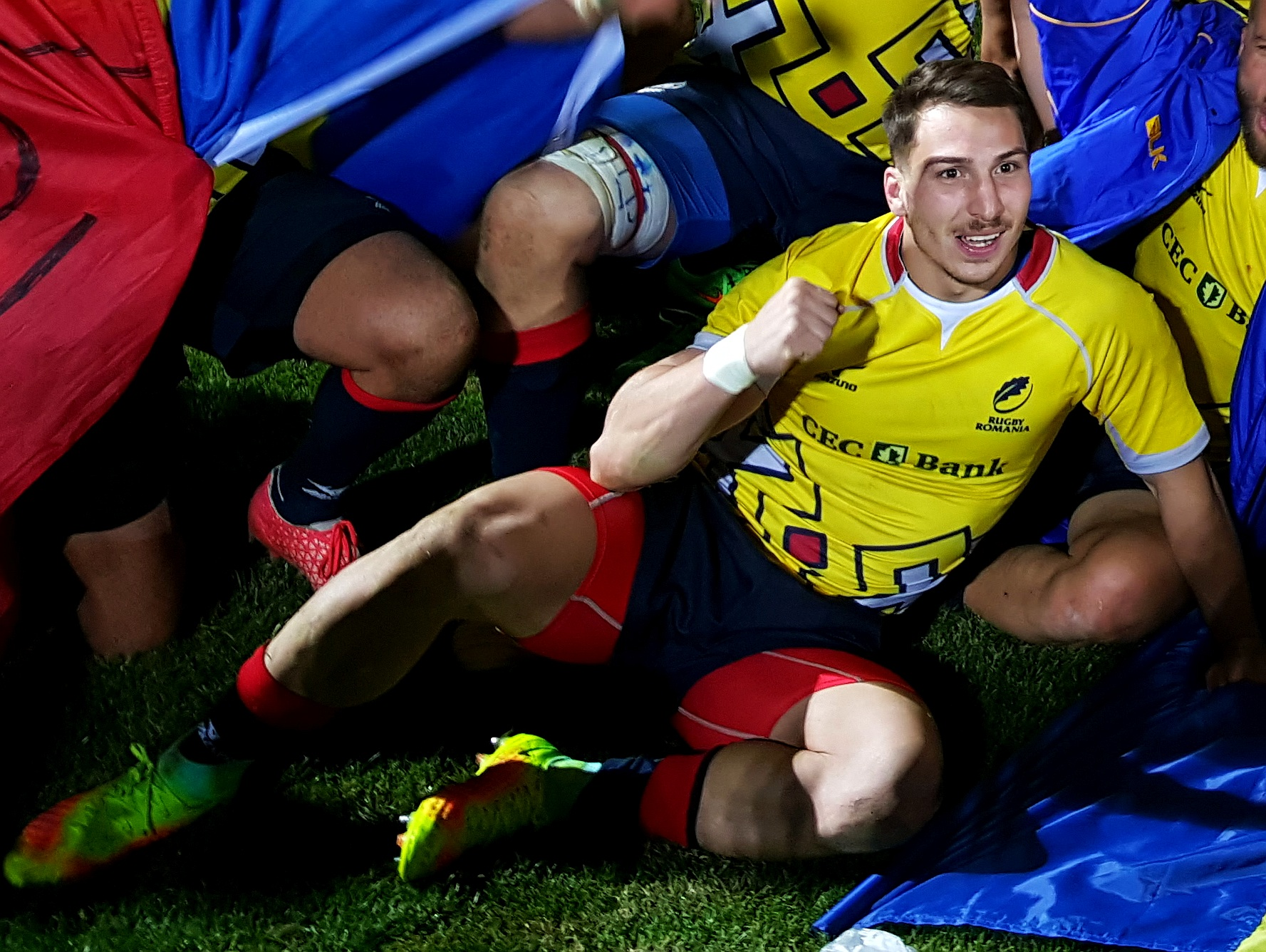
Dumitru after winning the Pershing Trophy Cup in 2015 at their home ground, Stadionul Arcul de Triumf after a test match against USA

Dumitru made his international debut in 2013 in the wing position against Russia. He played for Romania in the IRB Nations Cup and in their 2015 Rugby World Cup qualifying before appearing for them in their 2013 end of year tour.
