= Julien Berger =

Belgium international rugby union player (born 1990)

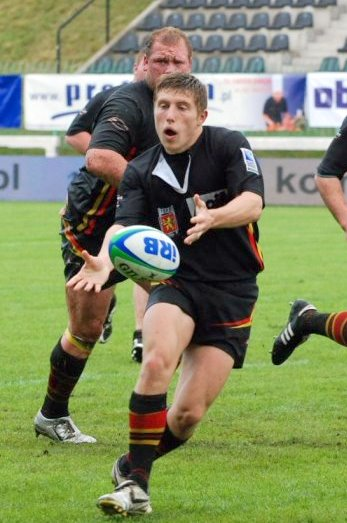
- Born: Julien Berger; 10 January 1990 (age 36)
- Height: 1.71 m (5 ft 7 in)
- Weight: 85 kg (187 lb)

Rugby union career
- Position: Scrum-half
Senior career
Years	Team	Apps	(Points)
2009–2015	La Rochelle	80	(20)
2015–2017	Provence Rugby	36	(25)
2017–2018	USA Limoges	16	(10)
2018–2019	RC Nimes	10	(5)
2019	USO Nevers	9	(5)
2020–	Union Cognac Saint-Jean-d'Angély	5	(0)
International career
Years	Team	Apps	(Points)
2010–	Belgium	29	(50)
- Correct as of 5 December 2020
National sevens team
Years	Team		Comps
	Belgium		1
- Correct as of 5 December 2020

Julien Berger is a Belgian rugby union player who currently plays for his national side and the French club La Rochelle as a scrum-half. He has played for La Rochelle since 2009 and has played 14 games, but had only started in 5 (during the 2011–12 season).
