= Stelian Burcea =

Romanian rugby union player

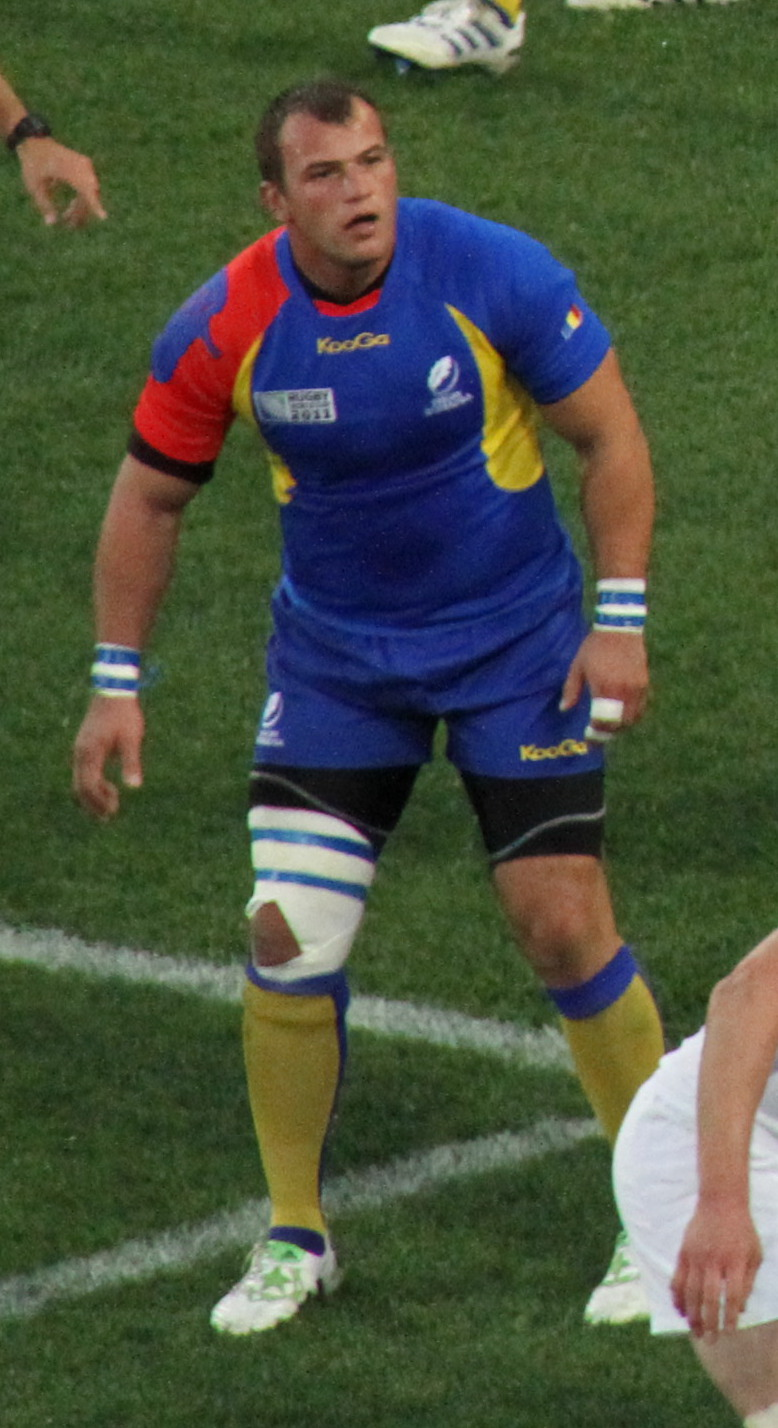
- Stelian Burcea at the 2011 Rugby World Cup
- Born: Sandu Stelian Burcea; 7 October 1983 (age 43) Pitești, Romania
- Height: 6 ft 4 in (1.93 m)
- Weight: 225 lb (102 kg; 16.1 st)

Rugby union career
- Position(s): Lock, Flanker, Number 8
Senior career
Years	Team	Apps	(Points)
2013–14	București Wolves	4	(0)
Provincial / State sides
Years	Team	Apps	(Points)
2005–11	Steaua București	35	(10)
2012–	Timișoara Saracens	40	(60)
- Correct as of 5 December 2015
International career
Years	Team	Apps	(Points)
2006–	Romania	71	(40)
- Correct as of 25 November 2017

Sandu Stelian Burcea (born 7 October 1983) is a Romanian rugby union player. He plays as a lock, flanker and number eight.

Burcea is a player and the captain for RC Timişoara in the Romanian Rugby Championship. He won the National Championship titles in 2011/12 and 2012/13. He is also player and captain for București Wolves, a team made from the best players at the Romanian Rugby Championship that competes at the European Challenge Cup.

He has 44 caps for Romania, since 2006, with 4 tries scored, 20 points on aggregate. Burcea first cap came at the 14-62 loss to France, in Bucharest, in a friendly game, at 17 June 2006, when he was 22 years old. He was called for the 2011 Rugby World Cup, playing in two games but without scoring. He played once again at the 2015 Rugby World Cup, being used in three games, but once again remaining scoreless.
