= Thibault Visensang =

Thibaut Visensang
- Born: Thibaut Visensang; 8 January 1991 (age 35)
- Height: 1.83 m (6 ft 0 in)
- Weight: 95 kg (14 st 13 lb)

Rugby union career
- Position: Flanker
Senior career
Years	Team	Apps	(Points)
2010-2013	Bayonne	8	(5)
2013-2014	Albi	24	(5)
2014-2016	Bayonne	19	(10)
2016-2018	US Tyrosse	35	(25)
2018-2022	UC Saint-Jean-d'Angély	?	(?)
- Correct as of 11 February 2025
International career
Years	Team	Apps	(Points)
2011	France U20	8	(5)
2014-2018	Spain	4	(0)
Coaching career
- Years: Team
- 2024-: US Tyrosse

Thibaut Visensang (born 8 January 1991) is a former French-born Spanish professional rugby union player. He played at flanker for Bayonne in the Top 14.
