= Anton Rudoy =

- Born: 21 February 1983 (age 43) Kazakhstan
- Height: 6 ft 3 in (1.91 m)
- Weight: 102 kg (225 lb)

Rugby union career
- Position: Flanker
- Current team: Krasny Yar
International career
Years	Team	Apps	(Points)
2006-2011	Kazakhstan	28	(120)
2015–Present	Russia	21	(60)

Anton Rudoy (Russian: Антон Владимирович Рудой; born 21 February 1983 in Almaty) is a Kazakh and Russian rugby union player. He plays as a flanker.

Rudoy has played in Russia for Enisey-STM, in 2003, RC Novokuznetsk, from 2004 to 2007, and once again for Enisey-STM, since 2008.

He has been a key player for Kazakhstan since his first game in 2006. He played in their 2011 Rugby World Cup campaign, that led them to be the second-best team from Asia, reaching a repechage game with Uruguay, losing 44–7. He also played in their disappointing 2015 Rugby World Cup qualifying match, where Kazakhstan was eliminated in the first round, not reaching the final stage of the Asia Cup.

Since 2015, he plays for the Russian national rugby union team.
