= Sione Fakaʻosilea =

Romania international rugby union player (born 1987)

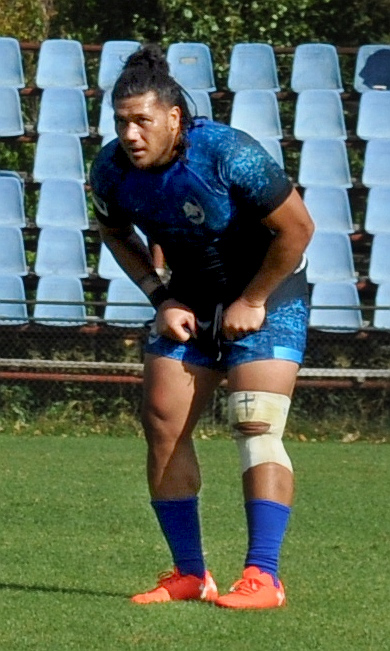
- Sione Fakaʻosilea playing for CSM Baia Mare in 2017
- Full name: Sione Ingo Fakaʻosilea
- Born: 13 January 1987 (age 39) Tonga
- Height: 1.82 m (5 ft 11 1/2 in)
- Weight: 109 kg (17 st 2 lb; 240 lb)

Rugby union career
- Position: Centre
- Current team: Baia Mare
Senior career
Years	Team	Apps	(Points)
2014–	Baia Mare		
- Correct as of 20 March 2017
International career
Years	Team	Apps	(Points)
2017–2018	Romania	13	(20)
- Correct as of 27 March 2018
National sevens team
Years	Team		Comps
2013	Tonga 7s		1 (0 pts)

Sione Fakaʻosilea (born 13 January 1987) is a rugby union player from Tonga. He plays in the centre position for professional SuperLiga club Baia Mare.

He played for the Tonga national rugby sevens team in 2013 and went on to play for Romania's national 15-a-side team, making his international debut at the 2017 Rugby Europe Championship in a match against the Russian Medvedi. However, after featuring in 13 internationals for Romania, including six in Rugby World Cup qualification matches for the 2019 Rugby World Cup, questions were raised over Fakaʻosilea's eligibility to represent Romania. As Fakaʻosilea had previously represented Tonga in Sevens rugby at the 2013 Gold Coast Sevens, this rendered him ineligible to represent Romania under World Rugby rules on switching nationalities.

== Honours ==
Baia Mare

- SuperLiga: 2014
