= Giorgi Kveseladze =

Georgian rugby union player

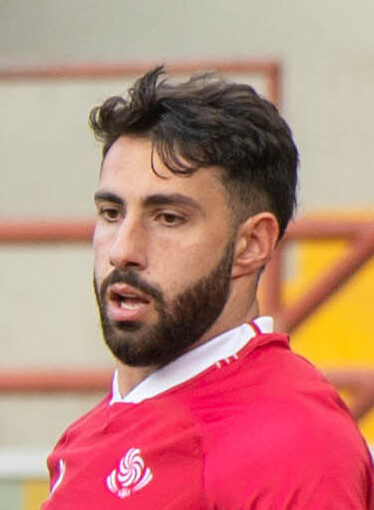
- Born: 11 November 1997 (age 29) Tbilisi, Georgia
- Height: 1.85 m (6 ft 1 in)
- Weight: 96 kg (15 st 2 lb; 212 lb)

Rugby union career
- Position: Centre
Senior career
Years	Team	Apps	(Points)
2017–2020	RC Armazi Marneuli	7	(10)
2021-2023	Gloucester	28	(0)
2023-2024	Black Lion	9	(0)
2024-	FC Grenoble	26	(15)
- Correct as of 3 December 2023
International career
Years	Team	Apps	(Points)
2016–2017	Georgia U20	12	(5)
2017–	Georgia	78	(65)
- Correct as of 2 August 2024

Giorgi Kveseladze (born November 11, 1997) is a Georgian rugby union player who plays as a centre for Georgian side Black Lion.

== Career ==
In 2018, Kveseladze played for Georgia Sevens, participating with Georgia in the 2018 Hong Kong rugby sevens tournament. He will quickly win in the Georgian back lines, holding the 2018 and 2019 European Championships. He was included in the Georgian squad for the 2019 Rugby World Cup. He played four matches for Georgia, and scored a try against Uruguay.

In 2020, after having taken part in the Rugby Europe International Championships again, he is part of the squad that takes part in the Autumn Nations Cup. It is particularly evident during the meeting against Ireland. He scored the first try for Georgia in the competition, and was named best player of the third weekend of competition. At the end of the competition, his try was voted the best try of the tournament.

On 16 December 2020, Kveseladze joined English side Gloucester in the Premiership Rugby on an undisclosed length deal. He is only the second Georgian player in history to sign with a Premiership club. He made his first appearance on the 6 February 2021 against London Irish, coming on in the 67th minute. He made his first start for the club against Northampton Saints.
