= Paula Kinikinilau =

Romania international rugby union player

Paula Fakavainga Kinikinilau
- Born: Paula Fakavainga Kinikinilau; 30 August 1986 (age 40) Fangale'ounga, Tonga
- Height: 6 ft 1 in (1.85 m)
- Weight: 16 st 7.5 lb (16 st 7.5 lb; 105.0 kg)

Rugby union career
- Position: Centre
Senior career
Years	Team	Apps	(Points)
2013–14	București Wolves	4	(5)
- Correct as of 27 August 2015
Provincial / State sides
Years	Team	Apps	(Points)
2010–11	Otago	1	(5)
2012	Steaua București	0	(0)
2012–	Timișoara Saracens	33	(50)
- Correct as of 5 December 2015
International career
Years	Team	Apps	(Points)
2015–	Romania	21	(30)
- Correct as of 25 November 2017

Paula Fakavainga Kinikinilau (born 30 August 1986) is a Tongan-born Romanian rugby union footballer. A centre, he is currently playing for RC Timişoara in the Romanian Rugby Championship. He played for the Otago ITM Cup team in the New Zealand Domestic competition in 2010. He also played in Singapore for the Penguins and in Hong Kong.

He made his international debut in 2015 during a Rugby World Cup warm-up match for Romania against Tonga. He played in the 2015 Rugby World Cup.
