= 2017 June rugby union tests =

International rugby matches

The 2017 mid-year rugby union internationals (also known as the summer internationals in the Northern Hemisphere) were international rugby union matches that were mostly played in the Southern Hemisphere during the June international window.

The matches were part of World Rugby's Global rugby calendar (2012–19) that includes Test matches between the touring Northern Hemisphere nations and the home Southern Hemisphere nations. In addition to this, the global calendar gives Tier 2 nations the opportunity to play Tier 1 nations outside the November international window, increasing competitiveness from the Tier 2 sides.

Australia, the only southern hemisphere Tier 1 nation not to host a test series, staged three one-off test matches; Scotland, Italy and Fiji. The Fijian test was the first between the two sides in Australia since 2010, and was also the first Australia v Tier 2 nation match in Australia since Samoa visited in 2011. Fiji also played host to Italy and Scotland to become the second Tier 2 nation to play three back-back Tier 1 sides during an international window, after Samoa participated in the South African quadrangular tournament in 2013. En route to their test matches in Australia and Fiji, Italy and Scotland played each other in Singapore, which was the first ever Tier 1 v Tier 1 match played in the country.

For Argentina, Australia, New Zealand and South Africa, the matches acted as warm-ups ahead of the 2017 Rugby Championship. It was also a historic match when Kenya hosted Germany as the teams had never played each other before.

== Series ==
The international window coincided with the 2017 British & Irish Lions tour to New Zealand, consisting of a three-test series between the Lions and New Zealand, plus seven non-test matches. Before the Lions series, New Zealand hosted Samoa for the first time since 2008. This was the first time that New Zealand hosted a Tier 2 nation since they played Fiji in June 2011. The match between New Zealand and Samoa followed a curtain raiser between Tonga and Wales, which was played at the same stadium, a neutral venue for the teams. Wales later travelled to Samoa, who hosted the Welsh for the first time since 1994.

South Africa hosted France for the first time since 2010, while playing their first test series against the French since 2005. Argentina hosted England for a two-test series, while Japan hosted Ireland for the first time since 2005, the last time the two sides met. Before Ireland faced Japan, they played a one-off test away to the United States.

| Series | Result | Winners |
|---|---|---|
| Argentina v England test series | 0–2 | England |
| Japan v Ireland test series | 0–2 | Ireland |
| New Zealand v British & Irish Lions test series | 1–1 | Drawn |
| South Africa v France test series | 3–0 | South Africa |

=== Other tours ===
Georgia travelled to the Americas where they played Canada, the United States and Argentina across the three week window. Romania, who no longer take part in the World Rugby Nations Cup, played three one-off matches, against Japan, Canada and Brazil. The Brazilian test was a historic first between the two nations, who had never played each other before, and was the first time since Brazil played a France XV side in 1985 that Brazil have played a team in a higher tier than them outside any tournament or competition. Before that test, Brazil played host to Portugal.

| Team/Tour | Opponents |
|---|---|
| Georgia tour | United States (won) – Canada (won) – Argentina (lost) |
| Italy tour | Scotland (lost) – Fiji (lost) – Australia (lost) |
| Romania tour | Japan (lost) – Canada (won) |
| Scotland tour | Italy (won) – Australia (won) – Fiji (lost) |
| Wales tour | Tonga (won) – Samoa (won) |

== Fixtures ==
=== 27–28 May ===
27 May 2017
16:00 EAT (UTC+03)

| Kenya | 29–30 | Germany |
| Try: Kerre 3' m Kopondo 17' c Onsomu 50' c Ambunya 60' c Con: Mukidza (3/4) 18', 51', 61'; Pen: Mukidza (1/2) 70' | Report | Try: Poppmeier 25' c Brenner 42' m Els 65' c Aounallah 73' m Con: Parkinson (1/2) 26'; Hilsenbeck (1/2) 66'; Pen: Parkinson (1/1) 2'; Drop: Hilsenbeck (1/1) 80+1' |

RFUEA Ground, Nairobi
Attendance: 10,000
Referee: Cwengile Jadezweni (South Africa)

Team details

| FB | 15 | Tony Onyango |
| RW | 14 | Darwin Mukidza |
| OC | 13 | David Ambunya |
| IC | 12 | Patrice Agunda | | (substituted off) 62' |
| LW | 11 | Jacob Ojee | | (substituted off) 74' |
| FH | 10 | Biko Adema | | (substituted off) 61' |
| SH | 9 | Samson Onsomu |
| N8 | 8 | Martin Owila | (yellow card) 76' to 80' |
| OF | 7 | Davis Chenge |
| BF | 6 | Eric Kerre | | (substituted off) 30' |
| RL | 5 | Simon Muniafu |
| LL | 4 | Wilson Kopondo (c) | | (substituted off) 52' |
| TP | 3 | Dennis Karani | | (substituted off) 48' |
| HK | 2 | Peter Karia | | (substituted off) 40' |
| LP | 1 | Moses Amusala | | (substituted off) 44' |
Replacements:
| HK | 16 | Philip Ikambili | | (substituted on) 40' |
| PR | 17 | Oscar Simiyu | | (substituted on) 44' |
| PR | 18 | Bramwell Mayaka | | (substituted on) 48' |
| LK | 19 | Oliver Mang’eni | | (substituted on) 52' |
| FL | 20 | George Nyambua | | (substituted on) 30' |
| SH | 21 | Kelvin Masai | | (substituted on) 61' |
| FH | 22 | Leo Seje Owade | | (substituted on) 62' |
| WG | 23 | Dennis Muhanji | | (substituted on) 74' |
Coach:
(South Africa) Jerome Paarwater

| FB | 15 | Harris Aounallah |
| RW | 14 | Ben Ellermann |
| OC | 13 | Marcel Coetzee | (substituted off) 21' |
| IC | 12 | Raynor Parkinson | (substituted off) 47' | (substituted on) 51' | (substituted off) 61' |
| LW | 11 | Mathieu Ducau |
| FH | 10 | Chris Hilsenbeck |
| SH | 9 | Tim Menzel | (substituted off) 59' |
| N8 | 8 | Jarrid Els |
| OF | 7 | Jaco Otto | (substituted off) 21' | (substituted on) 26' | (substituted off) 40' |
| BF | 6 | Kehoma Brenner | (substituted off) 47' |
| RL | 5 | Michael Poppmeier (c) |
| LL | 4 | Erik Marks |
| TP | 3 | Samy Füchsel | (substituted off) 71' |
| HK | 2 | Mika Tyumenev | (substituted off) 47' |
| LP | 1 | Julius Nostadt | (substituted off) 26' |
Replacements:
| PR | 16 | Jörn Schröder | (substituted on) 26' |
| PR | 17 | Antony Dickinson | (substituted on) 71' |
| N8 | 18 | Timo Vollenkemper | (substituted on) 47' |
| HK | 19 | Dasch Barber | (substituted on) 47' |
| WG | 20 | Mark Sztyndera | (substituted on) 21' |
| SH | 21 | Sean Armstrong | (substituted on) 59' |
| CE | 22 | Jamie Murphy | (substituted on) 47' | (substituted off) 51' | (substituted on) 61' |
| FL | 23 | Marcel Henn | (substituted on) 21' | (substituted off) 26' | (substituted on) 40' |
Coach:
(South Africa) Kobus Potgieter

Touch judges:
Kenya Appt. (Kenya)
Kenya Appt. (Kenya)

Notes:

- This was the first meeting between the two nations.
- Philip Ikambili, Bramwell Mayaka, George Nyambua, Leo Seje Owade and Oscar Simiyu (all Kenya) and Ben Ellermann and Marcel Henn (both Germany) made their international debuts.

28 May 2017
15:00 BST (UTC+01)

| England | 28–14 | Barbarians |
| Try: Earle 16' c Isiekwe 67' c Care 80' m Con: Ford (2/3) 17', 68'; Pen: Ford (3/4) 30', 40', 47' | Report | Try: Ashley-Cooper 42' c Tekori 76' c Con: Madigan (2/2) 44', 76' |

Twickenham Stadium, London
Attendance: 51,636
Referee: Andrew Brace (Ireland)

Team details

| FB | 15 | Mike Brown | (substituted off) 29' | (substituted on) 36' |
| RW | 14 | Nathan Earle | | | (substituted off) 72' |
| OC | 13 | Sam James |
| IC | 12 | Alex Lozowski | (substituted off) 14' |
| LW | 11 | Jonny May |
| FH | 10 | George Ford (c) |
| SH | 9 | Danny Care |
| N8 | 8 | Josh Beaumont | (substituted off) 47' |
| OF | 7 | Sam Underhill | (substituted off) 36' |
| BF | 6 | Chris Robshaw (c) |
| RL | 5 | Nick Isiekwe | (substituted off) 68' |
| LL | 4 | Charlie Ewels |
| TP | 3 | Will Collier | (substituted off) 64' |
| HK | 2 | Jack Singleton | (substituted off) 61' |
| LP | 1 | Ellis Genge | (substituted off) 68' |
Replacements:
| HK | 16 | George McGuigan | (substituted on) 61' |
| PR | 17 | Ross Harrison | (substituted on) 68' |
| PR | 18 | Jamal Ford-Robinson | (substituted on) 64' |
| LK | 19 | Will Spencer | (substituted on) 68' |
| FL | 20 | Tom Curry | (substituted on) 36' |
| FL | 21 | Mark Wilson | (substituted on) 47' |
| SH | 22 | Richard Wigglesworth | (substituted on) 29' | (substituted off) 36' | (substituted on) 72' |
| FB | 23 | Mike Haley | (substituted on) 14' |
Coach:
(Australia) Eddie Jones

| FB | 15 | (England) Alex Goode |
| RW | 14 | (Fiji) Timoci Nagusa |
| OC | 13 | (France) Yann David | | (substituted off) 20' |
| IC | 12 | (South Africa) François Steyn |
| LW | 11 | (Australia) Adam Ashley-Cooper | | (substituted off) 65' |
| FH | 10 | (Ireland) Ian Madigan |
| SH | 9 | (Samoa) Kahn Fotuali'i | | (substituted off) 65' |
| N8 | 8 | (Argentina) Facundo Isa | | (substituted off) 65' |
| OF | 7 | (England) Steffon Armitage | | (substituted off) 56' | (substituted on) 65' |
| BF | 6 | (France) Thierry Dusautoir (c) |
| RL | 5 | (New Zealand) Jeremy Thrush |
| LL | 4 | (Argentina) Patricio Albacete | | (substituted off) 45' |
| TP | 3 | (Samoa) Census Johnston | | (substituted off) 52' |
| HK | 2 | (Wales) Richard Hibbard | | (substituted off) 45' |
| LP | 1 | (Georgia (country)) Mikheil Nariashvili | (yellow card) 55' to 65' | | (substituted off) 65' |
Replacements:
| HK | 16 | (South Africa) Schalk Brits | | (substituted on) 45' |
| PR | 17 | (New Zealand) Chris King | | (substituted on) 56' |
| PR | 18 | (Scotland) WP Nel | | (substituted on) 52' |
| LK | 19 | (Samoa) Joe Tekori | | (substituted on) 45' |
| N8 | 20 | (France) Gillian Galan | | (substituted on) 65' |
| SH | 21 | (South Africa) Ruan Pienaar | | (substituted on) 65' |
| CE | 22 | (New Zealand) Robbie Fruean | | (substituted on) 20' |
| WG | 23 | (Argentina) Horacio Agulla | | (substituted on) 65' |
Coach:
(New Zealand) Vern Cotter

Man of the Match:
Tom Curry (England)

Touch judges:
John Lacey (Ireland)
Ben Whitehouse (Wales)
Television match official:
Peter Fitzgibbon (Ireland)

=== 1 June ===
1 June 2017
19:30 IST (UTC+01)

| Ulster (Ireland) | 28–43 | Barbarians |
| Try: McCloskey 5' c Keane 10' c Patterson 34' c O'Connor 42' c Con: Wilson (1/1) 6'; Pienaar (2/2) 11', 35'; Herron (1/1) 43' | Report | Try: Flynn 19' m Nayacalevu (2) 23' c, 60' c King (2) 31' m, 39' m Penalty try 54' c Tekori 77' c Con: Agulla (1/3) 24'; Madigan (2/3) 54', 60'; Dusautoir (1/1) 78' |

Ravenhill Stadium, Belfast
Attendance: 15,500
Referee: Ben Whitehouse (Wales)

Team details

| FB | 15 | (Ireland) Peter Nelson | (substituted off) 60' | (substituted on) 76' |
| RW | 14 | (Ireland) Mark Keane | (substituted off) 66' |
| OC | 13 | (Ireland) Callum Patterson | | (substituted off) 76' |
| IC | 12 | (Ireland) Stuart McCloskey |
| LW | 11 | (Ireland) Craig Gilroy |
| FH | 10 | (England) Brett Herron |
| SH | 9 | (South Africa) Ruan Pienaar (c) | (substituted off) 35' |
| N8 | 8 | (Ireland) Roger Wilson (c) | (substituted off) 53' |
| OF | 7 | (Ireland) Clive Ross |
| BF | 6 | (Ireland) Matthew Rea |
| RL | 5 | (England) Peter Browne |
| LL | 4 | (Ireland) Alan O'Connor | (substituted off) 58' |
| TP | 3 | (Ireland) Rodney Ah You | (substituted off) 40' |
| HK | 2 | (Ireland) Rob Herring | (substituted off) 53' |
| LP | 1 | (Ireland) Andrew Warwick | (substituted off) 40' |
Replacements:
| HK | 16 | (Ireland) John Andrew | (substituted on) 53' |
| PR | 17 | (Ireland) Kyle McCall | (substituted on) 40' |
| PR | 18 | (Ireland) Ross Kane | | (substituted on) 58' |
| N8 | 19 | (Ireland) Stephen Mulholland | (substituted on) 53' |
| FL | 20 | (Ireland) Chris Henry | (substituted on) 58' |
| SH | 21 | (Ireland) Paul Marshall | (substituted on) 35' |
| SH | 22 | (Ireland) David Shanahan | (substituted on) 60' |
| CE | 23 | (Ireland) Callum Smith | (substituted on) 66' |
| PR | 24 | (Ireland) Ricky Lutton | (substituted on) 40' | (substituted off) 58' |
Coach:
(Australia) Les Kiss

| FB | 15 | (England) Alex Goode |
| RW | 14 | (Samoa) David Smith |
| OC | 13 | (Fiji) Waisea Nayacalevu |
| IC | 12 | (New Zealand) Robbie Fruean |
| LW | 11 | (Argentina) Horacio Agulla | | (substituted off) 55' |
| FH | 10 | (Ireland) Ian Madigan | | (substituted off) 66' |
| SH | 9 | (South Africa) Rory Kockott | | (substituted off) 48' |
| N8 | 8 | (Argentina) Facundo Isa |
| OF | 7 | (France) Thierry Dusautoir (c) |
| BF | 6 | (Samoa) Joe Tekori | | (substituted off) 58' | (substituted on) 67' |
| RL | 5 | (Argentina) Patricio Albacete | | (substituted off) 43' |
| LL | 4 | (South Africa) Paul Willemse | | | (substituted off) 67' |
| TP | 3 | (Ireland) Mike Ross | | | (substituted off) 45' | (substituted on) 71' |
| HK | 2 | (New Zealand) Corey Flynn | | (substituted off) 51' |
| LP | 1 | (New Zealand) Chris King | | (substituted off) 43' | (substituted on) 45' | (substituted off) 51' |
Replacements:
| HK | 16 | (Wales) Richard Hibbard | | (substituted on) 51' |
| PR | 17 | (France) Vincent Pelo | | | | (substituted on) 51' |
| PR | 18 | (Samoa) Census Johnston | | (substituted on) 43' | (substituted off) 71' |
| LK | 19 | (New Zealand) Jeremy Thrush | | (substituted on) 58' |
| FL | 20 | (New Zealand) Chris Masoe | (yellow card) 76' to 80' | (substituted on) 43' |
| SH | 21 | (Samoa) Kahn Fotuali'i | | (substituted on) 48' |
| FH | 22 | (Australia) Brock James | | (substituted on) 66' |
| FB | 23 | (France) Jean-Marcellin Buttin | | (substituted on) 55' |
Coach:
(New Zealand) Vern Cotter

Man of the Match:
(France) Thierry Dusautoir (Barbarians)

Touch judges:
David Wilkinson (Ireland)
Jonny Erskine (Ireland)
Television match official:
Simon McDowell (Ireland)

=== 10 June ===
10 June 2017
15:00 AEST (UTC+10)

| Australia | 37–14 | Fiji |
| Try: Folau (2) 3' c, 54' c Speight (2) 10' m, 80' m Moore 66' c Con: Foley (3/4) 4', 55', 68'; Pen: Foley (2/2) 8', 28' | Report | Try: Goneva 62' c T. Nagusa 76' c Con: Volavola (2/2) 63', 78' |

Melbourne Rectangular Stadium, Melbourne
Attendance: 13,583
Referee: Matthew Carley (England)

Team details

| FB | 15 | Israel Folau | (yellow card) 19' to 29' |
| RW | 14 | Dane Haylett-Petty | | | (substituted off) 73' |
| OC | 13 | Tevita Kuridrani |
| IC | 12 | Karmichael Hunt |
| LW | 11 | Henry Speight | | (substituted off) 68' | (substituted on) 73' |
| FH | 10 | Bernard Foley | | (substituted off) 68' |
| SH | 9 | Will Genia | | (substituted off) 68' |
| N8 | 8 | Scott Higginbotham | | (substituted off) 68' |
| OF | 7 | Michael Hooper (c) |
| BF | 6 | Ned Hanigan |
| RL | 5 | Adam Coleman |
| LL | 4 | Sam Carter | | (substituted off) 50' |
| TP | 3 | Allan Alaalatoa | | (substituted off) 60' |
| HK | 2 | Tatafu Polota-Nau | | (substituted off) 53' |
| LP | 1 | Tom Robertson | | (substituted off) 57' |
Replacements:
| HK | 16 | Stephen Moore | | (substituted on) 53' |
| PR | 17 | Toby Smith | | (substituted on) 57' |
| PR | 18 | Sekope Kepu | | (substituted on) 60' |
| LK | 19 | Rory Arnold | | (substituted on) 50' |
| FL | 20 | Richard Hardwick | | (substituted on) 68' |
| SH | 21 | Joe Powell | | (substituted on) 68' |
| FH | 22 | Quade Cooper | | (substituted on) 68' |
| CE | 23 | Reece Hodge | | (substituted on) 68' |
Coach:
(Australia) Michael Cheika

| FB | 15 | Kini Murimurivalu |
| RW | 14 | Timoci Nagusa |
| OC | 13 | Albert Vulivuli | (substituted off) 68' |
| IC | 12 | Jale Vatubua |
| LW | 11 | Vereniki Goneva |
| FH | 10 | Ben Volavola |
| SH | 9 | Nikola Matawalu | (substituted off) 59' |
| N8 | 8 | Akapusi Qera (c) |
| OF | 7 | Naulia Dawai | (substituted off) 68' |
| BF | 6 | Dominiko Waqaniburotu | (substituted off) 50' |
| RL | 5 | Leone Nakarawa |
| LL | 4 | Tevita Cavubati | (substituted off) 50' |
| TP | 3 | Peni Ravai | (substituted off) 52' |
| HK | 2 | Sunia Koto | (substituted off) 46' |
| LP | 1 | Campese Ma'afu | (substituted off) 73' |
Replacements:
| HK | 16 | Talemaitoga Tuapati | (substituted on) 46' |
| PR | 17 | Joeli Veitayaki Jr. | (substituted on) 73' |
| PR | 18 | Kalivati Tawake | (substituted on) 52' |
| LK | 19 | Api Ratuniyarawa | (substituted on) 50' |
| FL | 20 | Viliame Mata | (substituted on) 50' |
| N8 | 21 | Nemani Nagusa | (substituted on) 68' |
| SH | 22 | Serupepeli Vularika | (substituted on) 59' |
| WG | 23 | Benito Masilevu | (substituted on) 68' |
Coach:
(New Zealand) John McKee

Man of the Match:
Will Genia (Australia)

Touch judges:
Wayne Barnes (England)
Brendon Pickerill (New Zealand)
Television match official:
Ben Skeen (New Zealand)

Notes:

- Ned Hanigan, Richard Hardwick, Karmichael Hunt, Joe Powell (all Australia), Viliame Mata, Kalivati Tawake and Jale Vatubua (all Fiji) made their international debuts.

10 June 2017
14:40 JST (UTC+09)

| Japan | 33–21 | Romania |
| Try: Yamada 12' c Fukuoka 37' c Leitch 41' c Con: Ogura (3/3) 14', 38', 42'; Pen: Ogura (4/4) 19', 23', 33', 52' | Report | Try: Macovei 55' c Faka'osilea 65' c Con: Vlaicu (2/2) 57', 67'; Pen: Vlaicu (3/3) 3', 5', 30' |

Umakana Yokana Stadium, Kumamoto
Attendance: 18,585
Referee: Alexandre Ruiz (France)

Team details

| FB | 15 | Ryuji Noguchi |
| RW | 14 | Akihito Yamada |
| OC | 13 | Timothy Lafaele |
| IC | 12 | Derek Carpenter | | (substituted off) 73' |
| LW | 11 | Kenki Fukuoka |
| FH | 10 | Jumpei Ogura | | (substituted off) 66' |
| SH | 9 | Fumiaki Tanaka | | (substituted off) 66' |
| N8 | 8 | Amanaki Mafi | | (substituted off) 57' |
| OF | 7 | Yoshitaka Tokunaga |
| BF | 6 | Michael Leitch |
| RL | 5 | Uwe Helu | | (substituted off) 66' |
| LL | 4 | Kotaro Yatabe |
| TP | 3 | Takuma Asahara | | (substituted off) 57' |
| HK | 2 | Shota Horie (c) | | (substituted off) 70' |
| LP | 1 | Koki Yamamoto | | (substituted off) 40' |
Replacements:
| HK | 16 | Yusuke Niwai | | (substituted on) 70' |
| PR | 17 | Keita Inagaki | | (substituted on) 40' |
| PR | 18 | Heiichiro Ito | (yellow card) 62' to 72' | (substituted on) 57' |
| LK | 19 | Yuya Odo | | (substituted on) 66' |
| FL | 20 | Hendrik Tui | | (substituted on) 57' |
| SH | 21 | Keisuke Uchida | | (substituted on) 66' |
| FH | 22 | Yu Tamura | | (substituted on) 66' |
| FB | 23 | Kotaro Matsushima | | (substituted on) 73' |
Coach:
(New Zealand) Jamie Joseph

| FB | 15 | Sabin Strătilă | (substituted off) 62' |
| RW | 14 | Tangimana Fonovai |
| OC | 13 | Paula Kinikinilau |
| IC | 12 | Sione Faka'osilea |
| LW | 11 | Jack Cobden | (substituted off) 61' |
| FH | 10 | Florin Vlaicu |
| SH | 9 | Florin Surugiu |
| N8 | 8 | Mihai Macovei (c) |
| OF | 7 | Viorel Lucaci |
| BF | 6 | Andrei Gorcioaia | (substituted off) 70' |
| RL | 5 | Marius Antonescu | (substituted off) 53' |
| LL | 4 | Johannes van Heerden |
| TP | 3 | Andrei Ursache | (substituted off) 76' |
| HK | 2 | Otar Turashvili | (substituted off) 66' |
| LP | 1 | Ionel Badiu | (substituted off) 57' |
Replacements:
| HK | 16 | Andrei Rădoi | (substituted on) 66' |
| PR | 17 | Constantin Pristăviță | (substituted on) 57' |
| PR | 18 | Alexandru Țăruș | (substituted on) 76' |
| LK | 19 | Valentin Popârlan | (substituted on) 53' |
| N8 | 20 | Vlad Nistor | (substituted on) 70' |
| SH | 21 | Tudorel Bratu |
| FH | 22 | Luke Samoa | (substituted on) 62' |
| WG | 23 | Ionuț Dumitru | (substituted on) 61' |
Coach:
(Wales) Lynn Howells

Touch judges:
JP Doyle (England)
Will Houston (Australia)
Television match official:
Glenn Newman (New Zealand)

Notes:

- Shota Horie (Japan) earned his 50th test cap.
- Derek Carpenter and Yusuke Niwai (both Japan) made their international debuts.

10 June 2017
20:00 SGT (UTC+08)

| Italy | 13–34 | Scotland |
| Try: Campagnaro 65' m Esposito 80' m Pen: Allan (1/1) 9' | Report | Try: Price 36' m Visser 39' c Ford (2) 42' c, 48' m Hoyland 74' c Con: Taylor (1/1) 40'; Russell (1/3) 43'; Horne (1/1) 75'; Pen: Russell (1/1) 5' |

National Stadium, Singapore
Attendance: 8,734
Referee: Paul Williams (New Zealand)

Team details

| FB | 15 | Edoardo Padovani |
| RW | 14 | Angelo Esposito |
| OC | 13 | Michele Campagnaro | | | | (substituted off) 70' |
| IC | 12 | Tommaso Boni | | (substituted off) 40' | (substituted on) 43' | (substituted off) 79' |
| LW | 11 | Leonardo Sarto |
| FH | 10 | Tommaso Allan | | (substituted off) 63' | | (substituted on) 79' |
| SH | 9 | Edoardo Gori (c) | | (substituted off) 57' |
| N8 | 8 | Robert Barbieri | | (substituted off) 50' |
| OF | 7 | Maxime Mbanda |
| BF | 6 | Francesco Minto |
| RL | 5 | Dean Budd | (yellow card) 46' to 56' |
| LL | 4 | Marco Fuser | | (substituted off) 57' |
| TP | 3 | Simone Ferrari | | (substituted off) 59' |
| HK | 2 | Luca Bigi | | (substituted off) 51' |
| LP | 1 | Andrea Lovotti | | (substituted off) 51' |
Replacements:
| HK | 16 | Ornel Gega | | (substituted on) 51' |
| PR | 17 | Federico Zani | | (substituted on) 51' |
| PR | 18 | Pietro Ceccarelli | | (substituted on) 59' |
| LK | 19 | Dries van Schalkwyk | | (substituted on) 57' |
| N8 | 20 | Braam Steyn | (yellow card) 71' to 80' | (substituted on) 50' |
| SH | 21 | Marcello Violi | | (substituted on) 57' |
| FH | 22 | Carlo Canna | | (substituted on) 63' |
| CE | 23 | Tommaso Benvenuti | | (substituted on) 40' | (substituted off) 43' | (substituted on) 70' |
Coach:
(Ireland) Conor O'Shea

| FB | 15 | Duncan Taylor |
| RW | 14 | Damien Hoyland |
| OC | 13 | Matt Scott |
| IC | 12 | Alex Dunbar |
| LW | 11 | Tim Visser | (substituted off) 68' |
| FH | 10 | Finn Russell | (substituted off) 39' | (substituted off) 50' |
| SH | 9 | Ali Price | (substituted off) 50' |
| N8 | 8 | Josh Strauss | (substituted off) 50' |
| OF | 7 | Ryan Wilson |
| BF | 6 | John Barclay (c) |
| RL | 5 | Ben Toolis |
| LL | 4 | Tim Swinson | (substituted off) 58' |
| TP | 3 | WP Nel | (substituted off) 55' |
| HK | 2 | Ross Ford | (substituted off) 55' |
| LP | 1 | Allan Dell | 18' to 27' | | (substituted off) 55' |
Replacements:
| HK | 16 | Fraser Brown | (substituted on) 55' |
| PR | 17 | Gordon Reid | (substituted on) 18' | (substituted off) 27' | (substituted on) 55' |
| PR | 18 | Zander Fagerson | (substituted on) 55' |
| FL | 19 | Rob Harley | (substituted on) 50' |
| FL | 20 | Magnus Bradbury | (substituted on) 58' |
| WG | 21 | Rory Hughes | (substituted on) 68' |
| SH | 22 | Henry Pyrgos | (substituted on) 50' |
| FH | 23 | Peter Horne | (substituted on) 39' | (substituted off) 41' | (substituted on) 50' |
Coach:
(Scotland) Gregor Townsend

Man of the Match:
Ben Toolis (Scotland)

Touch judges:
Mike Fraser (New Zealand)
Jordan Way (Australia)
Television match official:
Minoru Fuji (Japan)

Notes:

- John Hardie was named in the starting XV, but withdrew after getting injured during the warm-up. Ryan Wilson replaced Hardie in the starting XV, Rory Hughes was added to the bench.
- Luca Bigi, Dean Budd and Federico Zani (all Italy) made their international debuts.

10 June 2017
17:00 SAST (UTC+02)

| South Africa | 37–14 | France |
| Try: Kriel 30' c Penalty try 59'; Cronjé 60' c Serfontein 67' c Con: Jantjies (3/3) 32', 61', 68'; Pen: Jantjies (3/3) 10', 14', 39' | Report | Try: Chavancy 34' c Serin 54' c Con: Plisson (2/2) 36', 55' |

Loftus Versfeld Stadium, Pretoria
Attendance: 29,313
Referee: Glen Jackson (New Zealand)

Team details

| FB | 15 | Andries Coetzee |
| RW | 14 | Raymond Rhule | (substituted off) 72' |
| OC | 13 | Jesse Kriel | (substituted off) 56' |
| IC | 12 | Jan Serfontein |
| LW | 11 | Courtnall Skosan |
| FH | 10 | Elton Jantjies |
| SH | 9 | Ross Cronjé | (substituted off) 63' |
| N8 | 8 | Warren Whiteley (c) |
| OF | 7 | Oupa Mohojé | (substituted off) 59' |
| BF | 6 | Siya Kolisi |
| RL | 5 | Franco Mostert | (substituted off) 63' |
| LL | 4 | Eben Etzebeth |
| TP | 3 | Frans Malherbe | (substituted off) 63' |
| HK | 2 | Malcolm Marx | (substituted off) 63' |
| LP | 1 | Tendai Mtawarira | (substituted off) 53' |
Replacements:
| HK | 16 | Bongi Mbonambi | (substituted on) 63' |
| PR | 17 | Steven Kitshoff | (substituted on) 53' |
| PR | 18 | Coenie Oosthuizen | (substituted on) 63' |
| LK | 19 | Pieter-Steph du Toit | (substituted on) 63' |
| FL | 20 | Jean-Luc du Preez | (substituted on) 59' |
| SH | 21 | Francois Hougaard | (substituted on) 63' |
| FH | 22 | François Steyn | (substituted on) 56' |
| WG | 23 | Dillyn Leyds | (substituted on) 72' |
Coach:
(South Africa) Allister Coetzee

| FB | 15 | Brice Dulin | (yellow card) 60' to 70' | (substituted off) 70' |
| RW | 14 | Yoann Huget |
| OC | 13 | Henry Chavancy |
| IC | 12 | Gaël Fickou |
| LW | 11 | Virimi Vakatawa |
| FH | 10 | Jules Plisson | | (substituted off) 70' |
| SH | 9 | Maxime Machenaud | | (substituted off) 46' |
| N8 | 8 | Louis Picamoles | | (substituted off) 63' |
| OF | 7 | Loann Goujon | | (substituted off) 51' |
| BF | 6 | Yacouba Camara |
| RL | 5 | Yoann Maestri (c) |
| LL | 4 | Julien Le Devedec |
| TP | 3 | Uini Atonio | | (substituted off) 21' | (substituted on) 26' | (substituted off) 53' |
| HK | 2 | Clément Maynadier | | (substituted off) 51' |
| LP | 1 | Jefferson Poirot | | (substituted off) 59' |
Replacements:
| HK | 16 | Camille Chat | | (substituted on) 51' |
| PR | 17 | Eddy Ben Arous | | (substituted on) 59' |
| PR | 18 | Mohamed Boughanmi | | (substituted on) 21' | (substituted off) 26' | (substituted on) 53' |
| FL | 19 | Bernard Le Roux | | (substituted on) 63' |
| FL | 20 | Kevin Gourdon | | (substituted on) 51' |
| SH | 21 | Baptiste Serin | | (substituted on) 46' |
| FH | 22 | Jean-Marc Doussain | | (substituted on) 70' |
| WG | 23 | Vincent Rattez | | (substituted on) 70' |
Coach:
(France) Guy Novès

Man of the Match:
Malcolm Marx (South Africa)

Touch judges:
Ben O'Keeffe (New Zealand)
Marius Mitrea (Italy)
Television match official:
Rowan Kitt (England)

Notes:

- Andries Coetzee, Ross Cronjé, Dillyn Leyds, Raymond Rhule and Courtnall Skosan (all South Africa) and Mohamed Boughanmi and Vincent Rattez (both France) made their international debuts.

10 June 2017
13:00 BRT (UTC-03)

| Brazil | 25–21 | Portugal |
| Try: Tenório 73' m F. Sancery 76' c D. Sancery 78' c Con: Duque (2/3) 77', 79'; Pen: Duque (2/2) 8', 16' | Report | Try: T. Appleton 10' m Cardoso Pinto 48' c Con: Penha e Costa (1/2) 49'; Pen: Penha e Costa (3/5) 18', 45', 68' |

Pacaembu Stadium, São Paulo
Referee: Damian Schneider (Argentina)

Team details

| FB | 15 | Daniel Sancery |
| RW | 14 | Stefano Giantorno | (substituted off) 5' |
| OC | 13 | Felipe Sancery |
| IC | 12 | Moisés Duque |
| LW | 11 | Luca Tranquez | (substituted off) 54' |
| FH | 10 | Josh Reeves |
| SH | 9 | Lucas Duque | (substituted off) 62' |
| N8 | 8 | Nick Smith | (substituted off) 40' |
| OF | 7 | Artur Bergo | (substituted off) 65' |
| BF | 6 | André Arruda |
| RL | 5 | Gabriel Paganini |
| LL | 4 | Cléber Dias |
| TP | 3 | Matheus Rocha | (substituted off) 40' |
| HK | 2 | Yan Rosetti (c) |
| LP | 1 | Jonatas Paulo | (substituted off) 36' |
Replacements:
| HK | 16 | Endy Willian |
| PR | 17 | Caíque Silva | (substituted on) 36' |
| PR | 18 | Pedro Bengaló | (substituted on) 40' |
| FL | 19 | Matheus Daniel | (substituted on) 40' |
| FL | 20 | João Luiz da Ros | (substituted on) 65' |
| SH | 21 | Laurent Bourda-Couhet | (substituted on) 5' |
| WG | 22 | De Wet van Niekerk | (substituted on) 54' |
| WG | 23 | Robert Tenório | (substituted on) 62' |
Coach:
(Argentina) Rodolfo Ambrosio

| FB | 15 | Manuel Cardoso Pinto |
| RW | 14 | Gonçalo Foro (c) |
| OC | 13 | Tomás Appleton |
| IC | 12 | José Luis Cabral |
| LW | 11 | Aderito Esteves |
| FH | 10 | Nuno Penha e Costa | | (substituted off) 75' |
| SH | 9 | Francisco Pinto Magalhães | | (substituted off) 73' |
| N8 | 8 | João Lino |
| OF | 7 | Sebastião Villax | (yellow card) 55' to 65' |
| BF | 6 | Geordie McSullea | | (substituted off) 49' |
| RL | 5 | Gonçalo Uva |
| LL | 4 | José Andrade |
| TP | 3 | Francisco Bruno | | (substituted off) 65' |
| HK | 2 | Duarte Diniz | | (substituted off) 65' |
| LP | 1 | Bruno Medeiros | | (substituted off) 65' |
Replacements:
| PR | 16 | João Corte Real | | (substituted on) 65' |
| PR | 17 | Nuno Mascarenhas | | (substituted on) 65' |
| HK | 18 | José Conde | | (substituted on) 65' |
| LK | 19 | João Granate | | (substituted on) 49' |
| FL | 20 | Francisco Appleton |
| FB | 21 | Jorge Abecassis | | (substituted on) 75' |
| SH | 22 | Manuel Queirós | | (substituted on) 73' |
| WG | 23 | Castelo Branco |
Coach:
(Portugal) Martim Aguiar

Touch judges:
Henrique Platais (Brazil)
Ricardo Sant'Anna (Brazil)

Notes:

- Jorge Abecassis, José Luis Cabral and Manuel Cardoso Pinto (all Portugal) made their international debuts.
- Brazil defeated Portugal for the first time ever.

10 June 2017
16:15 ART (UTC-03)

| Argentina | 34–38 | England |
| Try: Boffelli 7' c Lavanini 36' c De la Fuente 50' c Tuculet 52' c Con: Sánchez (4/4) 8', 37', 51', 54'; Pen: Sánchez (1/3) 40'; Drop: Hernández (1/1) 76' | Report | Try: Yarde 30' c May 46' c Ford 64' m Solomona 78' c Con: Ford (3/4) 32', 48', 78'; Pen: Ford (4/4) 16', 26', 42', 62' |

Estadio San Juan del Bicentenario, San Juan
Attendance: 23,000
Referee: Nigel Owens (Wales)

Team details

| FB | 15 | Joaquín Tuculet |
| RW | 14 | Matías Moroni |
| OC | 13 | Matías Orlando |
| IC | 12 | Jerónimo de la Fuente |
| LW | 11 | Emiliano Boffelli | (substituted off) 61' |
| FH | 10 | Nicolás Sánchez | (substituted off) 61' |
| SH | 9 | Martín Landajo | (substituted off) 68' |
| N8 | 8 | Juan Manuel Leguizamón | (substituted off) 57' |
| OF | 7 | Javier Ortega Desio |
| BF | 6 | Pablo Matera |
| RL | 5 | Tomás Lavanini | (substituted off) 47' |
| LL | 4 | Matías Alemanno |
| TP | 3 | Enrique Pieretto | (substituted off) 54' |
| HK | 2 | Agustín Creevy (c) | (substituted off) 47' |
| LP | 1 | Lucas Noguera Paz | (substituted off) 69' |
Replacements:
| HK | 16 | Julián Montoya | (substituted on) 47' |
| PR | 17 | Santiago García Botta | (substituted on) 69' |
| PR | 18 | Nahuel Tetaz Chaparro | (substituted on) 54' |
| LK | 19 | Guido Petti | (substituted on) 47' |
| N8 | 20 | Leonardo Senatore | (substituted on) 57' |
| SH | 21 | Gonzalo Bertranou | (substituted on) 68' |
| CE | 22 | Juan Martín Hernández | (substituted on) 61' |
| WG | 23 | Ramiro Moyano | (substituted on) 61' |
Coach:
(Argentina) Daniel Hourcade

| FB | 15 | Mike Brown |
| RW | 14 | Marland Yarde | (substituted off) 50' |
| OC | 13 | Henry Slade |
| IC | 12 | Alex Lozowski | (substituted off) 54' |
| LW | 11 | Jonny May |
| FH | 10 | George Ford |
| SH | 9 | Danny Care | (substituted off) 77' |
| N8 | 8 | Nathan Hughes |
| OF | 7 | Tom Curry | (substituted off) 70' |
| BF | 6 | Mark Wilson |
| RL | 5 | Charlie Ewels | (substituted off) 76' |
| LL | 4 | Joe Launchbury |
| TP | 3 | Harry Williams | (substituted off) 61' |
| HK | 2 | Dylan Hartley (c) |
| LP | 1 | Ellis Genge | (substituted off) 54' |
Replacements:
| HK | 16 | Jack Singleton |
| PR | 17 | Matt Mullan | (substituted on) 54' |
| PR | 18 | Will Collier | (substituted on) 61' |
| LK | 19 | Nick Isiekwe | (substituted on) 76' |
| FL | 20 | Don Armand | (substituted on) 70' |
| SH | 21 | Jack Maunder | (substituted on) 77' |
| FH | 22 | Piers Francis | (substituted on) 54' |
| WG | 23 | Denny Solomona | (substituted on) 50' |
Coach:
(Australia) Eddie Jones

Man of the Match:
George Ford (England)

Touch judges:
John Lacey (Ireland)
Egon Seconds (South Africa)
Television match official:
Aaron Paterson (New Zealand)

Notes:

- Emiliano Boffelli (Argentina) and Don Armand, Will Collier, Tom Curry, Piers Francis, Nick Isiekwe, Alex Lozowski, Jack Maunder, Denny Solomona, Harry Williams and Mark Wilson (all England) made their international debuts.

10 June 2017
15:00 MDT (UTC-06)

| Canada | 0–13 | Georgia |
| | Report | Try: Kvirikashvili 75' c Con: Kvirikashvili (1/1) 77'; Pen: Kvirikashvili (2/4) 4', 46' |

Calgary Rugby Park, Calgary
Referee: Andrew Brace (Ireland)

Team details

| FB | 15 | Andrew Coe | | (substituted off) 63' |
| RW | 14 | Dan Moor |
| OC | 13 | Conor Trainor |
| IC | 12 | Giuseppe du Toit |
| LW | 11 | Sean Duke |
| FH | 10 | Shane O'Leary |
| SH | 9 | Phil Mack |
| N8 | 8 | Admir Cejvanovic |
| OF | 7 | Matt Heaton |
| BF | 6 | Kyle Baillie | | (substituted off) 40' |
| RL | 5 | Conor Keys | | (substituted off) 59' | (substituted on) 78' |
| LL | 4 | Brett Beukeboom (c) | (yellow card) 71' to 80' |
| TP | 3 | Jake Ilnicki | | (substituted off) 60' |
| HK | 2 | Benoît Piffero | | (substituted off) 71' |
| LP | 1 | Djustice Sears-Duru | | (substituted off) 60' |
Replacements:
| HK | 16 | Eric Howard | | (substituted on) 71' |
| PR | 17 | Anthony Luca | | (substituted on) 60' |
| PR | 18 | Matt Tierney | | (substituted on) 60' |
| LK | 19 | Liam Chisholm | | (substituted on) 59' | (substituted off) 78' |
| N8 | 20 | Aaron Carpenter | | (substituted on) 20' |
| SH | 21 | Andrew Ferguson |
| FH | 22 | Gradyn Bowd |
| CE | 23 | Ciaran Hearn | | (substituted on) 63' |
Coach:
(New Zealand) Mark Anscombe

| FB | 15 | Merab Kvirikashvili |
| RW | 14 | Soso Matiashvili |
| OC | 13 | Davit Kacharava |
| IC | 12 | Merab Sharikadze (c) |
| LW | 11 | Alexander Todua |
| FH | 10 | Lasha Khmaladze | (substituted off) 78' |
| SH | 9 | Vasil Lobzhanidze | (substituted off) 68' |
| N8 | 8 | Beka Bitsadze |
| OF | 7 | Giorgi Tkhilaishvili | (substituted off) 39' |
| BF | 6 | Lasha Lomidze |
| RL | 5 | Konstantin Mikautadze | (substituted off) 58' |
| LL | 4 | Giorgi Nemsadze | (substituted off) 78' |
| TP | 3 | Anton Peikrishvili | (substituted off) 27' |
| HK | 2 | Jaba Bregvadze | (substituted off) 70' |
| LP | 1 | Mikheil Nariashvili | (substituted off) 66' |
Replacements:
| HK | 16 | Badri Alkhazashvili | (substituted on) 70' |
| PR | 17 | Karlen Asieshvili | (substituted on) 66' |
| PR | 18 | Soso Bekoshvili | (substituted on) 27' |
| LK | 19 | Nodar Tcheishvili | (substituted on) 78' |
| FL | 20 | Otar Giorgadze | (substituted on) 39' |
| SH | 21 | Giorgi Begadze | (substituted on) 68' |
| FH | 22 | Lasha Malaghuradze | (substituted on) 78' |
| LK | 23 | Giorgi Chkhaidze | (substituted on) 58' |
Coach:
(New Zealand) Milton Haig

Man of the Match:
Shane O'Leary (Canada)

Touch judges:
Shuhei Kubo (Japan)
Ben Whitehouse (Wales)

Notes:

- Davit Kacharava (Georgia) earned his 100th test cap.
- Andrew Coe, Anthony Luca and Shane O'Leary (all Canada) made their international debuts.
- Canada failed to score in a match for the first time since losing 41–0 to Scotland in 2008, while Georgia shut out an opponent for the first time since beating Belgium 35–0 in 2014.

10 June 2017
16:00 EDT (UTC-04)

| United States | 19–55 | Ireland |
| Try: Civetta 19' c Quill 45' c Matyas 54' m Con: MacGinty (2/3) 20', 46' | Report | Try: Earls (2) 2' m, 18' m Stockdale 14' c N. Scannell 30' m Marmion 34' c Conan 43' c Ja. Ryan 61' m McGrath 67' c Zebo 74' c Con: Ringrose (1/1) 15'; Carbery (2/6) 35', 44'; R. Scannell (2/2) 68', 75' |

Red Bull Arena, Harrison
Attendance: 22,370
Referee: Luke Pearce (England)

Team details

| FB | 15 | Ben Cima | (substituted off) 60' |
| RW | 14 | Mike Te'o |
| OC | 13 | Ryan Matyas |
| IC | 12 | Marcel Brache | (substituted off) 27' | (substituted on) 35' | (substituted off) 66' |
| LW | 11 | Martin Iosefo | (substituted off) 50' |
| FH | 10 | AJ MacGinty |
| SH | 9 | Nate Augspurger (c) |
| N8 | 8 | David Tameilau | (substituted off) 40' |
| OF | 7 | Tony Lamborn |
| BF | 6 | John Quill |
| RL | 5 | Nick Civetta | (substituted off) 47' |
| LL | 4 | Nate Brakeley |
| TP | 3 | Chris Baumann | (substituted off) 48' |
| HK | 2 | Peter Malcolm | (substituted off) 40' |
| LP | 1 | Ben Tarr | (substituted off) 40' |
Replacements:
| HK | 16 | James Hilterbrand | (substituted on) 40' |
| PR | 17 | Joe Taufete'e | (substituted on) 40' |
| PR | 18 | Paddy Ryan | (substituted on) 48' |
| LK | 19 | Matthew Jensen | (substituted on) 47' |
| FL | 20 | Andrew Durutalo | (substituted on) 40' |
| SH | 21 | Shaun Davies | (substituted on) 50' |
| FH | 22 | Will Magie | (substituted on) 27' | (substituted off) 35' | (substituted on) 66' |
| CE | 23 | Bryce Campbell | (substituted on) 60' |
Coach:
(New Zealand) John Mitchell

| FB | 15 | Tiernan O'Halloran | (substituted off) 71' |
| RW | 14 | Keith Earls |
| OC | 13 | Garry Ringrose |
| IC | 12 | Luke Marshall | (substituted off) 50' |
| LW | 11 | Jacob Stockdale |
| FH | 10 | Joey Carbery | (substituted off) 50' |
| SH | 9 | Kieran Marmion | (substituted off) 60' |
| N8 | 8 | Jack Conan |
| OF | 7 | Josh Van Der Flier |
| BF | 6 | Rhys Ruddock (c) |
| RL | 5 | Devin Toner |
| LL | 4 | Quinn Roux | (substituted off) 60' |
| TP | 3 | John Ryan | (substituted off) 50' |
| HK | 2 | Niall Scannell | (substituted off) 50' |
| LP | 1 | Cian Healy | (substituted off) 50' |
Replacements:
| HK | 16 | Dave Heffernan | (substituted on) 50' |
| PR | 17 | Dave Kilcoyne | (substituted on) 50' |
| PR | 18 | Andrew Porter | (substituted on) 50' |
| LK | 19 | James Ryan | (substituted on) 60' |
| FL | 20 | Dan Leavy | (substituted on) 71' |
| SH | 21 | Luke McGrath | (substituted on) 60' |
| CE | 22 | Rory Scannell | (substituted on) 40' |
| FB | 23 | Simon Zebo | (substituted on) 50' |
Coach:
(New Zealand) Joe Schmidt

Touch judges:
Federico Anselmi (Argentina)
Chris Assmus (Canada)
Television match official:
Neil Paterson (Scotland)

Notes:

- Paddy Ryan (United States) and Dave Heffernan, Andrew Porter, James Ryan, Rory Scannell and Jacob Stockdale (all Ireland) made their international debuts.

=== 16–17 June ===
16 June 2017
17:30 NZST (UTC+12)

| Tonga | 6–24 | Wales |
| Pen: Takulua (2/4) 22', 43' | Report | Try: Cuthbert 18' m Penalty try 79'; Pen: S. Davies (4/6) 2', 51', 67', 77' |

Eden Park, Auckland, New Zealand
Attendance: 26,129
Referee: Nick Briant (New Zealand)

Team details

| FB | 15 | David Halaifonua |
| RW | 14 | Nafi Tuitavake | (substituted off) 70' |
| OC | 13 | Siale Piutau (c) |
| IC | 12 | Viliami Tahituʻa | (substituted off) 59' |
| LW | 11 | Cooper Vuna |
| FH | 10 | Latiume Fosita |
| SH | 9 | Sonatane Takulua | (substituted off) 77' |
| N8 | 8 | Valentino Mapapalangi |
| OF | 7 | Nili Latu | (substituted off) 74' |
| BF | 6 | Daniel Faleafa |
| RL | 5 | Steve Mafi |
| LL | 4 | Leva Fifita |
| TP | 3 | Ben Tameifuna | (substituted off) 56' |
| HK | 2 | Paul Ngauamo |
| LP | 1 | Latu Talakai | (substituted off) 58' |
Replacements:
| HK | 16 | Suliasi Taufalele |
| PR | 17 | Sila Puafisi | (substituted on) 56' |
| PR | 18 | Phil Kite | (substituted on) 58' |
| FL | 19 | Sione Tau |
| FL | 20 | Michael Faleafa | (substituted on) 74' |
| SH | 21 | Leon Fukofuka | (substituted on) 77' |
| FH | 22 | Kali Hala | (substituted on) 59' |
| WG | 23 | Kiti Taimani Vaini | (substituted on) 70' |
Coach:
(Australia) Toutai Kefu

| FB | 15 | Gareth Anscombe |
| RW | 14 | Alex Cuthbert | (substituted off) 40' |
| OC | 13 | Scott Williams | (substituted off) 58' | (substituted on) 67' |
| IC | 12 | Jamie Roberts (c) |
| LW | 11 | Steff Evans |
| FH | 10 | Sam Davies |
| SH | 9 | Gareth Davies |
| N8 | 8 | Josh Navidi | (substituted off) 78' |
| OF | 7 | Thomas Young | (substituted off) 58' |
| BF | 6 | Aaron Shingler |
| RL | 5 | Cory Hill |
| LL | 4 | Seb Davies |
| TP | 3 | Tomas Francis | (substituted off) 78' |
| HK | 2 | Kristian Dacey | (substituted off) 58' |
| LP | 1 | Nicky Smith | (substituted off) 78' |
Replacements:
| HK | 16 | Ryan Elias | (substituted on) 58' |
| PR | 17 | Wyn Jones | (substituted on) 78' |
| PR | 18 | Dillon Lewis | (substituted on) 78' |
| FL | 19 | Ellis Jenkins | (substituted on) 58' |
| FL | 20 | Ollie Griffiths | (substituted on) 78' |
| SH | 21 | Aled Davies | (substituted on) 70' |
| FH | 22 | Owen Williams | (substituted on) 58' | (substituted off) 67' |
| CE | 23 | Cory Allen | (substituted on) 40' |
Coach:
(Wales) Robin McBryde

Touch judges:
Mike Fraser (New Zealand)
Cam Stone (New Zealand)
Television match official:
Ben Skeen (New Zealand)

Notes:

- This was Wales' first win at Eden Park.
- Michael Faleafa, Leva Fifita, Leon Fukofuka, Phil Kite, Latu Talakai, Kiti Taimani Vaini and Ben Tameifuna (all Tonga) and Aled Davies, Seb Davies, Ryan Elias, Steff Evans, Ollie Griffiths, Wyn Jones, Dillon Lewis, Owen Williams and Thomas Young (all Wales) made their international debuts.

16 June 2017
20:00 NZST (UTC+12)

| New Zealand | 78–0 | Samoa |
| Try: Lienert-Brown 11' c B. Barrett (2) 29' c, 58' c A. Savea (2) 33' c, 75' c Williams 39' c Dagg 41' c Savea 51' m Taylor 55' c Fifita 61' c Perenara 71' m Cane 78' m Con: B. Barrett (7/8) 12', 30', 34', 40', 42', 56', 60'; Sopoaga (2/4) 62', 77' | Report |

Eden Park, Auckland
Attendance: 26,129
Referee: Mathieu Raynal (France)

Team details

| FB | 15 | Ben Smith (c) | (substituted off) 62' |
| RW | 14 | Israel Dagg |
| OC | 13 | Anton Lienert-Brown |
| IC | 12 | Sonny Bill Williams |
| LW | 11 | Julian Savea |
| FH | 10 | Beauden Barrett | (substituted off) 60' |
| SH | 9 | Aaron Smith | (substituted off) 56' |
| N8 | 8 | Ardie Savea |
| OF | 7 | Sam Cane |
| BF | 6 | Jerome Kaino | (substituted off) 56' |
| RL | 5 | Sam Whitelock | (substituted off) 50' |
| LL | 4 | Brodie Retallick |
| TP | 3 | Owen Franks | (substituted off) 50' |
| HK | 2 | Codie Taylor | (substituted off) 62' |
| LP | 1 | Joe Moody | (substituted off) 50' |
Replacements:
| HK | 16 | Nathan Harris | (substituted on) 62' |
| PR | 17 | Wyatt Crockett | (substituted on) 50' |
| PR | 18 | Charlie Faumuina | (substituted on) 50' |
| LK | 19 | Scott Barrett | (substituted on) 50' |
| LK | 20 | Vaea Fifita | (substituted on) 56' |
| SH | 21 | TJ Perenara | (substituted on) 56' |
| FH | 22 | Lima Sopoaga | (substituted on) 60' |
| FB | 23 | Jordie Barrett | (substituted on) 62' |
Coach:
(New Zealand) Steve Hansen

| FB | 15 | Ahsee Tuala |
| RW | 14 | Albert Nikoro | (substituted off) 56' |
| OC | 13 | Kieron Fonotia |
| IC | 12 | Alapati Leiua |
| LW | 11 | Tim Nanai-Williams |
| FH | 10 | Tusi Pisi | (substituted off) 62' |
| SH | 9 | Kahn Fotuali'i (c) | (substituted off) 73' |
| N8 | 8 | Faifili Levave |
| OF | 7 | Fa'alemiga Selesele | (substituted off) 57' |
| BF | 6 | Piula Faʻasalele |
| RL | 5 | Fa'atiga Lemalu |
| LL | 4 | Chris Vui | (substituted off) 60' |
| TP | 3 | Census Johnston | (substituted off) 50' |
| HK | 2 | Manu Leiataua | (substituted off) 60' |
| LP | 1 | Viliamu Afatia | (substituted off) 68' |
Replacements:
| HK | 16 | Seilala Lam | (substituted on) 60' |
| PR | 17 | Nephi Leatigaga | (substituted on) 68' |
| PR | 18 | Paul Alo-Emile | (substituted on) 50' |
| FL | 19 | Taiasina Tuifu'a | (substituted on) 60' |
| FL | 20 | Alafoti Fa'osiliva | (substituted on) 57' |
| SH | 21 | Dwayne Polataivao | (substituted on) 73' |
| FH | 22 | D'Angelo Leuila | (substituted on) 62' |
| WG | 23 | Ken Pisi | (substituted on) 56' |
Coach:
(New Zealand) Alama Ieremia

Touch judges:
Rohan Hoffmann (Australia)
Jordan Way (Australia)
Television match official:
Ian Smith (Australia)

Notes:

- Samoa failed to score in a game for the first time since losing to Fiji 60–0 in 1996; they failed to score against New Zealand for the first time.
- Jordie Barrett and Vaea Fifita (both New Zealand) and Paul Alo-Emile and Kieron Fonotia (both Samoa) made their international debuts.
- Beauden Barrett (New Zealand) earned his 50th test cap.

17 June 2017
14:40 FJT (UTC+12)

| Fiji | 22–19 | Italy |
| Try: Vasiteri 3' c Vatubua 16' c Goneva 44' m Con: Volavola (2/3) 4', 16'; Drop: Volavola (1/1) 80' | Report | Try: Mbanda 56' c Con: Allan (1/1) 57'; Pen: Allan (4/4) 6', 14', 27', 76' |

ANZ National Stadium, Suva
Attendance: 10,000
Referee: Paul Williams (New Zealand)

Team details

| FB | 15 | Kini Murimurivalu |
| RW | 14 | Timoci Nagusa | (yellow card) 54' to 64' |
| OC | 13 | Jale Vatubua |
| IC | 12 | Eroni Vasiteri | | (substituted off) 61' |
| LW | 11 | Vereniki Goneva |
| FH | 10 | Ben Volavola |
| SH | 9 | Serupepeli Vularika | | (substituted off) 66' |
| N8 | 8 | Nemani Nagusa | | (substituted off) 75' |
| OF | 7 | Akapusi Qera (c) |
| BF | 6 | Dominiko Waqaniburotu | | (substituted off) 50' |
| RL | 5 | Leone Nakarawa |
| LL | 4 | Api Ratuniyarawa | | (substituted off) 50' |
| TP | 3 | Kalivati Tawake | | (substituted off) 40' |
| HK | 2 | Talemaitoga Tuapati |
| LP | 1 | Peni Ravai | | (substituted off) 73' |
Replacements:
| HK | 16 | Jale Sassen |
| PR | 17 | Joeli Veitayaki Jr. | | (substituted on) 73' |
| PR | 18 | Manasa Saulo | | (substituted on) 40' |
| LK | 19 | Tevita Cavubati | | (substituted on) 50' |
| FL | 20 | Viliame Mata | | (substituted on) 50' |
| FL | 21 | Mosese Voka | | (substituted on) 75' |
| SH | 22 | Nikola Matawalu | | (substituted on) 66' |
| WG | 23 | Benito Masilevu | | (substituted on) 61' |
Coach:
(New Zealand) John McKee

| FB | 15 | Edoardo Padovani |
| RW | 14 | Angelo Esposito |
| OC | 13 | Michele Campagnaro |
| IC | 12 | Tommaso Boni | (substituted off) 71' |
| LW | 11 | Leonardo Sarto |
| FH | 10 | Tommaso Allan |
| SH | 9 | Marcello Violi | (substituted off) 61' |
| N8 | 8 | Braam Steyn | (substituted off) 47' |
| OF | 7 | Maxime Mbanda |
| BF | 6 | Francesco Minto (c) |
| RL | 5 | Dean Budd |
| LL | 4 | Marco Fuser | (substituted off) 72' |
| TP | 3 | Simone Ferrari | (substituted off) 26' | (substituted on) 32' | (substituted off) 75' |
| HK | 2 | Luca Bigi | (substituted off) 50' |
| LP | 1 | Andrea Lovotti | (substituted off) 63' |
Replacements:
| HK | 16 | Ornel Gega | (substituted on) 50' |
| PR | 17 | Federico Zani | (substituted on) 63' |
| PR | 18 | Tiziano Pasquali | (substituted on) 26' | (substituted off) 32' | (substituted on) 75' |
| LK | 19 | Dries van Schalkwyk | (substituted on) 47' |
| LK | 20 | Federico Ruzza | (substituted on) 72' |
| SH | 21 | Tito Tebaldi | (substituted on) 61' |
| FH | 22 | Carlo Canna |
| CE | 23 | Tommaso Benvenuti | (substituted on) 71' |
Coach:
(Ireland) Conor O'Shea

Touch judges:
Pascal Gaüzère (France)
Graham Cooper (Australia)

Notes:

- Tiziano Pasquali (Italy) made his international debut.

17 June 2017
15:00 AEST (UTC+10)

| Australia | 19–24 | Scotland |
| Try: Folau (2) 19' c, 39' m Genia 56' c Con: Foley (2/3) 20', 57' | Report | Try: Taylor 14' c Russell 26' c Watson 61' c Con: Russell (3/3) 15', 26', 62'; Pen: Tonks (1/1) 2' |

Sydney Football Stadium, Sydney
Attendance: 30,721
Referee: Wayne Barnes (England)

Team details

| FB | 15 | Israel Folau |
| RW | 14 | Dane Haylett-Petty |
| OC | 13 | Tevita Kuridrani |
| IC | 12 | Karmichael Hunt | | (substituted off) 66' |
| LW | 11 | Eto Nabuli | | (substituted off) 60' |
| FH | 10 | Bernard Foley | (yellow card) 23' to 33' |
| SH | 9 | Will Genia |
| N8 | 8 | Scott Higginbotham | | (substituted off) 56' |
| OF | 7 | Michael Hooper (c) |
| BF | 6 | Ned Hanigan |
| RL | 5 | Adam Coleman |
| LL | 4 | Sam Carter | | (substituted off) 42' |
| TP | 3 | Allan Alaalatoa | | (substituted off) 54' |
| HK | 2 | Tatafu Polota-Nau | | (substituted off) 49' |
| LP | 1 | Tom Robertson | | (substituted off) 68' |
Replacements:
| HK | 16 | Stephen Moore | | (substituted on) 49' |
| PR | 17 | Scott Sio | | (substituted on) 68' |
| PR | 18 | Sekope Kepu | | (substituted on) 54' |
| LK | 19 | Rory Arnold | | (substituted on) 42' |
| FL | 20 | Richard Hardwick | | (substituted on) 56' |
| SH | 21 | Joe Powell |
| FH | 22 | Quade Cooper | | (substituted on) 66' |
| CE | 23 | Reece Hodge | | (substituted on) 60' |
Coach:
(Australia) Michael Cheika

| FB | 15 | Greig Tonks |
| RW | 14 | Lee Jones |
| OC | 13 | Alex Dunbar |
| IC | 12 | Duncan Taylor |
| LW | 11 | Rory Hughes | | (substituted off) 40' |
| FH | 10 | Finn Russell |
| SH | 9 | Ali Price | | (substituted off) 64' |
| N8 | 8 | Ryan Wilson | (yellow card) 38' to 48' | (substituted off) 57' |
| OF | 7 | Hamish Watson |
| BF | 6 | John Barclay (c) |
| RL | 5 | Jonny Gray |
| LL | 4 | Ben Toolis | | (substituted off) 72' |
| TP | 3 | Zander Fagerson | | (substituted off) 45' |
| HK | 2 | Fraser Brown | | (substituted off) 48' |
| LP | 1 | Gordon Reid | | (substituted off) 54' |
Replacements:
| HK | 16 | Ross Ford | | (substituted on) 48' |
| PR | 17 | Allan Dell | | (substituted on) 54' |
| PR | 18 | WP Nel | | (substituted on) 45' |
| LK | 19 | Tim Swinson | | (substituted on) 72' |
| N8 | 20 | Josh Strauss | | (substituted on) 57' |
| SH | 21 | Henry Pyrgos | | (substituted on) 64' |
| FB | 22 | Ruaridh Jackson |
| CE | 23 | Matt Scott | | (substituted on) 40' |
Coach:
(Scotland) Gregor Townsend

Touch judges:
Matthew Carley (England)
Brendon Pickerill (New Zealand)
Television match official:
Shane McDermott (New Zealand)

Notes:

- Eto Nabuli (Australia) made his international debut.
- Scotland defeated Australia for the first time since their 9–6 away victory in 2012.
- Scotland beat Australia away for a second consecutive match, following their 9–6 victory in Australia in 2012..

17 June 2017
14:00 JST (UTC+09)

| Japan | 22–50 | Ireland |
| Try: Noguchi 59' c Fukuoka 76' m Nagare 78' m Con: Matsuda (2/3) 60', 79'; Pen: Tamura (1/1) 14' | Report | Try: Earls (2) 11' c, 70' m Leavy (2) 24' c, 28' c Conan (2) 30' c, 45' c Ringrose 65' c Con: Jackson (5/5) 12', 25', 29', 32', 46'; R. Scannell (1/2) 66'; Pen: Jackson (1/1) 6' |

Shizuoka Stadium, Shizuoka
Attendance: 27,381
Referee: Marius van der Westhuizen (South Africa)

Team details

| FB | 15 | Ryuji Noguchi |
| RW | 14 | Kotaro Matsushima |
| OC | 13 | Will Tupou |
| IC | 12 | Derek Carpenter | | (substituted off) 66' |
| LW | 11 | Kenki Fukuoka |
| FH | 10 | Yu Tamura | | (substituted off) 58' |
| SH | 9 | Fumiaki Tanaka | | (substituted off) 54' |
| N8 | 8 | Amanaki Mafi | | (substituted off) 40' |
| OF | 7 | Yoshitaka Tokunaga |
| BF | 6 | Michael Leitch |
| RL | 5 | Uwe Helu | | (substituted off) 54' |
| LL | 4 | Kotaro Yatabe |
| TP | 3 | Heiichiro Ito | (yellow card) 24' to 34' | (substituted off) 58' |
| HK | 2 | Shota Horie (c) | | (substituted off) 54' |
| LP | 1 | Keita Inagaki | | (substituted off) 40' |
Replacements:
| HK | 16 | Yusuke Niwai | | (substituted on) 54' |
| PR | 17 | Shintaro Ishihara | | (substituted on) 40' |
| PR | 18 | Takuma Asahara | | (substituted on) 58' |
| FL | 19 | Hendrik Tui | | (substituted on) 40' |
| N8 | 20 | Shuhei Matsuhashi | | (substituted on) 54' |
| SH | 21 | Yutaka Nagare | | (substituted on) 54' |
| CE | 22 | Ryohei Yamanaka | | (substituted on) 66' |
| FH | 23 | Rikiya Matsuda | | (substituted on) 58' |
Coach:
(New Zealand) Jamie Joseph

| FB | 15 | Simon Zebo | | (substituted off) 40' |
| RW | 14 | Andrew Conway | (yellow card) 51' to 61' |
| OC | 13 | Garry Ringrose | | (substituted off) 67' |
| IC | 12 | Rory Scannell |
| LW | 11 | Keith Earls |
| FH | 10 | Paddy Jackson | | (substituted off) 61' |
| SH | 9 | Luke McGrath |
| N8 | 8 | Jack Conan | | | | | | (substituted off) 75' |
| OF | 7 | Dan Leavy | | (substituted off) 53' | (substituted on) 58' |
| BF | 6 | Rhys Ruddock (c) | | | | (substituted off) 63' | (substituted on) 72' |
| RL | 5 | Devin Toner | | (substituted off) 61' |
| LL | 4 | Quinn Roux |
| TP | 3 | John Ryan | | (substituted off) 61' | (substituted on) 78' |
| HK | 2 | Niall Scannell | | (substituted off) 54' |
| LP | 1 | Cian Healy | | (substituted off) 58' |
Replacements:
| HK | 16 | James Tracy | | (substituted on) 54' |
| PR | 17 | Dave Kilcoyne | | (substituted on) 58' |
| PR | 18 | Finlay Bealham | | (substituted on) 61' | (substituted off) 78' |
| LK | 19 | Kieran Treadwell | | (substituted on) 61' |
| N8 | 20 | Jack O'Donoghue | | (substituted on) 53' | (substituted off) 58' | (substituted on) 63' | (substituted off) 72' | (substituted on) 75' |
| SH | 21 | Kieran Marmion | | (substituted on) 67' |
| WG | 22 | Rory O'Loughlin | | (substituted on) 61' |
| FB | 23 | Tiernan O'Halloran | | (substituted on) 40' |
Coach:
(New Zealand) Joe Schmidt

Touch judges:
JP Doyle (England)
Alexandre Ruiz (France)
Television match official:
Glenn Newman (New Zealand)

Notes:

- Will Tupou (Japan) and Rory O'Loughlin and Kieran Treadwell (both Ireland) made their international debuts.

17 June 2017
19:35 NZST (UTC+12)

| Māori All Blacks | 10–32 | British & Irish Lions |
| Try: Messam 12' c Con: McKenzie (1/1) 13'; Pen: McKenzie (1/2) 22' | Report | Try: Penalty try 51'; Itoje 54'c Con: Halfpenny (1/1) 56'; Pen: Halfpenny (6/6) 5', 10', 20', 33', 44', 70' |

Rotorua International Stadium, Rotorua
Attendance: 28,177
Referee: Jaco Peyper (South Africa)

Team details

| FB | 15 | James Lowe |
| RW | 14 | Nehe Milner-Skudder |
| OC | 13 | Matt Proctor | | (substituted off) 54' |
| IC | 12 | Charlie Ngatai |
| LW | 11 | Rieko Ioane |
| FH | 10 | Damian McKenzie | | (substituted off) 67' |
| SH | 9 | Tawera Kerr-Barlow | (yellow card) 48' to 58' | (substituted off) 74' |
| N8 | 8 | Liam Messam |
| OF | 7 | Elliot Dixon | | (substituted off) 72' |
| BF | 6 | Akira Ioane |
| RL | 5 | Tom Franklin |
| LL | 4 | Joe Wheeler | | (substituted off) 70' |
| TP | 3 | Ben May | | (substituted off) 70' |
| HK | 2 | Ash Dixon (c) | | (substituted off) 70' |
| LP | 1 | Kane Hames | | (substituted off) 62' |
Replacements:
| HK | 16 | Hikawera Elliot | | (substituted on) 70' |
| PR | 17 | Chris Eves | | (substituted on) 62' |
| PR | 18 | Marcel Renata | | (substituted on) 70' |
| LK | 19 | Leighton Price | | (substituted on) 70' |
| FL | 20 | Kara Pryor | | (substituted on) 72' |
| SH | 21 | Bryn Hall | | (substituted on) 74' |
| FH | 22 | Ihaia West | | (substituted on) 67' |
| CE | 23 | Rob Thompson | | (substituted on) 54' |
Coach:
(New Zealand) Colin Cooper

| FB | 15 | (Wales) Leigh Halfpenny |
| RW | 14 | (England) Anthony Watson |
| OC | 13 | (Wales) Jonathan Davies |
| IC | 12 | (England) Ben Te'o |
| LW | 11 | (Wales) George North | (substituted off) 64' |
| FH | 10 | (Ireland) Johnny Sexton | (substituted off) 67' |
| SH | 9 | (Ireland) Conor Murray | (substituted off) 67' |
| N8 | 8 | (Wales) Taulupe Faletau |
| OF | 7 | (Ireland) Seán O'Brien |
| BF | 6 | (Ireland) Peter O'Mahony (c) | (substituted off) 64' |
| RL | 5 | (England) George Kruis | (substituted off) 60' |
| LL | 4 | (England) Maro Itoje |
| TP | 3 | (Ireland) Tadhg Furlong | (substituted off) 65' |
| HK | 2 | (England) Jamie George | (substituted off) 65' |
| LP | 1 | (England) Mako Vunipola | (substituted off) 60' |
Replacements:
| HK | 16 | (Wales) Ken Owens | (substituted on) 65' |
| PR | 17 | (Ireland) Jack McGrath | (substituted on) 60' |
| PR | 18 | (England) Kyle Sinckler | (substituted on) 65' |
| LK | 19 | (Ireland) Iain Henderson | (substituted on) 60' |
| FL | 20 | (Wales) Sam Warburton | (substituted on) 64' |
| SH | 21 | (Scotland) Greig Laidlaw | (substituted on) 67' |
| FH | 22 | (Wales) Dan Biggar | (substituted on) 67' |
| CE | 23 | (England) Elliot Daly | (substituted on) 64' |
Coach:
(New Zealand) Warren Gatland

Touch judges:
Jérôme Garcès (France)
Romain Poite (France)
Television match official:
Ian Smith (Australia)

17 June 2017
17:00 SAST (UTC+02)

| South Africa | 37–15 | France |
| Try: Serfontein 20' c Kolisi 27' c Oosthuizen 68' c Jantjies 79' c Con: Jantjies (4/4) 22', 28', 70', 80'; Pen: Jantjies (3/4) 6', 31', 39' | Report | Try: Spedding 3' c Penaud 70' m Con: Serin (1/1) 4'; Pen: Trinh-Duc (1/2) 64' |

Kings Park Stadium, Durban
Attendance: 41,000
Referee: Ben O'Keeffe (New Zealand)

Team details

| FB | 15 | Andries Coetzee |
| RW | 14 | Raymond Rhule | (substituted off) 79' |
| OC | 13 | Lionel Mapoe | (substituted off) 65' |
| IC | 12 | Jan Serfontein |
| LW | 11 | Courtnall Skosan |
| FH | 10 | Elton Jantjies |
| SH | 9 | Ross Cronjé | (substituted off) 65' |
| N8 | 8 | Warren Whiteley (c) |
| OF | 7 | Oupa Mohojé | (substituted off) 14' |
| BF | 6 | Siya Kolisi |
| RL | 5 | Franco Mostert |
| LL | 4 | Eben Etzebeth | (substituted off) 65' |
| TP | 3 | Frans Malherbe | (substituted off) 65' |
| HK | 2 | Malcolm Marx | (substituted off) 74' |
| LP | 1 | Tendai Mtawarira | (substituted off) 53' |
Replacements:
| HK | 16 | Bongi Mbonambi | (substituted on) 74' |
| PR | 17 | Steven Kitshoff | (substituted on) 53' |
| PR | 18 | Coenie Oosthuizen | (substituted on) 65' |
| LK | 19 | Pieter-Steph du Toit | (substituted on) 65' |
| FL | 20 | Jean-Luc du Preez | (substituted on) 14' |
| SH | 21 | Francois Hougaard | (substituted on) 65' |
| FH | 22 | François Steyn | (substituted on) 65' |
| WG | 23 | Dillyn Leyds | (substituted on) 79' |
Coach:
(South Africa) Allister Coetzee

| FB | 15 | Scott Spedding |
| RW | 14 | Yoann Huget | (substituted off) 13' |
| OC | 13 | Damian Penaud |
| IC | 12 | Gaël Fickou |
| LW | 11 | Virimi Vakatawa |
| FH | 10 | François Trinh-Duc | (substituted off) 74' |
| SH | 9 | Baptiste Serin | (substituted off) 56' |
| N8 | 8 | Louis Picamoles | (substituted off) 22' |
| OF | 7 | Kevin Gourdon |
| BF | 6 | Yacouba Camara |
| RL | 5 | Romain Taofifénua |
| LL | 4 | Yoann Maestri | (substituted off) 73' |
| TP | 3 | Rabah Slimani | (substituted off) 58' |
| HK | 2 | Guilhem Guirado (c) | (substituted off) 74' |
| LP | 1 | Jefferson Poirot | (substituted off) 58' |
Replacements:
| HK | 16 | Clément Maynadier | (substituted on) 74' |
| PR | 17 | Eddy Ben Arous | (substituted on) 58' |
| PR | 18 | Uini Atonio | (substituted on) 58' |
| FL | 19 | Julien Le Devedec | (substituted on) 73' |
| FL | 20 | Bernard Le Roux | (substituted on) 22' |
| SH | 21 | Antoine Dupont | (substituted on) 56' |
| FH | 22 | Jean-Marc Doussain | (substituted on) 74' |
| WG | 23 | Nans Ducuing | (substituted on) 13' |
Coach:
(France) Guy Novès

Man of the Match:
Siya Kolisi (South Africa)

Touch judges:
Glen Jackson (New Zealand)
Angus Gardner (Australia)
Television match official:
Rowan Kitt (England)

Notes:

- Nans Ducuing and Damian Penaud (both France) made their international debuts.
- Yoann Huget (France) earned his 50th test cap.

17 June 2017
16:15 ART (UTC-03)

| Argentina | 25–35 | England |
| Try: Tuculet 7' c Matera 51' m Boffelli 58' c Con: Sánchez (2/3) 9', 59'; Pen: Sánchez (2/4) 14', 18' | Report | Try: Ewels 4' c Francis 30' m Care 55' c Collier 64' c Con: Ford (3/4) 5', 56', 65'; Pen: Ford (2/2) 10', 28'; Drop: Ford (1/1) 73' |

Estadio Brigadier General Estanislao López, Santa Fe
Attendance: 29,750
Referee: John Lacey (Ireland)

Team details

| FB | 15 | Joaquín Tuculet |
| RW | 14 | Ramiro Moyano |
| OC | 13 | Matías Orlando |
| IC | 12 | Jerónimo de la Fuente |
| LW | 11 | Emiliano Boffelli | (substituted off) 73' |
| FH | 10 | Nicolás Sánchez |
| SH | 9 | Martín Landajo | (substituted off) 73' |
| N8 | 8 | Juan Manuel Leguizamón |
| OF | 7 | Javier Ortega Desio |
| BF | 6 | Pablo Matera | (substituted off) 54' |
| RL | 5 | Tomás Lavanini |
| LL | 4 | Matías Alemanno | (substituted off) 46' |
| TP | 3 | Enrique Pieretto | (substituted off) 49' |
| HK | 2 | Agustín Creevy (c) | (substituted off) 59' |
| LP | 1 | Lucas Noguera Paz | (substituted off) 46' |
Replacements:
| HK | 16 | Julián Montoya | (substituted on) 59' |
| PR | 17 | Nahuel Tetaz Chaparro | (substituted on) 46' |
| PR | 18 | Ramiro Herrera | (substituted on) 49' |
| LK | 19 | Guido Petti | (substituted on) 46' |
| N8 | 20 | Leonardo Senatore | (substituted on) 54' |
| SH | 21 | Gonzalo Bertranou | (substituted on) 73' |
| CE | 22 | Juan Martín Hernández | (substituted on) 61' |
| CE | 23 | Matías Moroni | (substituted on) 73' |
Coach:
(Argentina) Daniel Hourcade

| FB | 15 | Mike Brown |
| RW | 14 | Marland Yarde | (substituted off) 65' |
| OC | 13 | Henry Slade |
| IC | 12 | Piers Francis | (substituted off) 65' |
| LW | 11 | Jonny May |
| FH | 10 | George Ford |
| SH | 9 | Danny Care |
| N8 | 8 | Nathan Hughes |
| OF | 7 | Sam Underhill | (substituted off) 59' |
| BF | 6 | Chris Robshaw |
| RL | 5 | Charlie Ewels |
| LL | 4 | Joe Launchbury |
| TP | 3 | Harry Williams | (substituted off) 59' |
| HK | 2 | Dylan Hartley (c) |
| LP | 1 | Ellis Genge | (substituted off) 52' |
Replacements:
| HK | 16 | Jack Singleton |
| PR | 17 | Matt Mullan | (substituted on) 52' |
| PR | 18 | Will Collier | (substituted on) 59' |
| LK | 19 | Nick Isiekwe |
| FL | 20 | Mark Wilson | (substituted on) 59' |
| SH | 21 | Jack Maunder |
| FH | 22 | Alex Lozowski | (substituted on) 65' |
| WG | 23 | Denny Solomona | (substituted on) 65' |
Coach:
(Australia) Eddie Jones

Touch judges:
Nigel Owens (Wales)
Egon Seconds (South Africa)
Television match official:
Aaron Paterson (New Zealand)

Notes:

- Sam Underhill (England) made his international debut.

17 June 2017
15:00 MDT (UTC-06)

| Canada | 9–25 | Romania |
| Pen: McRorie (3/4) 11', 24', 47' | Report | Try: Lucaci 17' c Fonovai (2) 41' c, 62' m Con: Vlaicu (2/3) 18', 42'; Pen: Vlaicu (2/3) 53', 73' |

Ellerslie Rugby Park, Edmonton
Referee: Shuhei Kubo (Japan)

Team details

| FB | 15 | Ciaran Hearn |
| RW | 14 | D. T. H. van der Merwe (c) | (yellow card) 55' to 65' |
| OC | 13 | Conor Trainor | | (substituted off) 29' |
| IC | 12 | Nick Blevins | | (substituted off) 53' |
| LW | 11 | Sean Duke |
| FH | 10 | Connor Braid |
| SH | 9 | Gordon McRorie | | (substituted off) 63' |
| N8 | 8 | Aaron Carpenter | | (substituted off) 40' |
| OF | 7 | Matt Heaton |
| BF | 6 | Tyler Ardron | (yellow card) 23' to 33' |
| RL | 5 | Evan Olmstead |
| LL | 4 | Brett Beukeboom (c) |
| TP | 3 | Matt Tierney | | (substituted off) 63' |
| HK | 2 | Ray Barkwill | | (substituted off) 63' |
| LP | 1 | Anthony Luca | | (substituted off) 49' |
Replacements:
| HK | 16 | Benoît Piffero | | (substituted on) 63' |
| PR | 17 | Djustice Sears-Duru | | (substituted on) 49' |
| PR | 18 | Ryan Ackerman | | (substituted on) 63' |
| LK | 19 | Conor Keys | | (substituted on) 40' | (substituted off) 58' |
| FL | 20 | Kyle Baillie | | | (substituted on) 58' |
| SH | 21 | Phil Mack | | (substituted on) 63' |
| FH | 22 | Shane O'Leary | | (substituted on) 53' |
| FB | 23 | Andrew Coe | | (substituted on) 29' |
Coach:
(New Zealand) Mark Anscombe

| FB | 15 | Luke Samoa |
| RW | 14 | Tangimana Fonovai |
| OC | 13 | Paula Kinikinilau |
| IC | 12 | Sione Faka'osilea |
| LW | 11 | Ionuț Dumitru | | (substituted off) 77' |
| FH | 10 | Florin Vlaicu |
| SH | 9 | Florin Surugiu |
| N8 | 8 | Mihai Macovei (c) |
| OF | 7 | Viorel Lucaci | | (substituted off) 71' |
| BF | 6 | Vlad Nistor | | (substituted off) 26' |
| RL | 5 | Valentin Popârlan |
| LL | 4 | Johannes van Heerden |
| TP | 3 | Andrei Ursache | | (substituted off) 65' |
| HK | 2 | Otar Turashvili | (red card) 23' |
| LP | 1 | Ionel Badiu | | (substituted off) 65' |
Replacements:
| PR | 16 | Constantin Pristăviță | | (substituted on) 65' |
| HK | 17 | Andrei Rădoi | | (substituted on) 26' |
| PR | 18 | Alexandru Țăruș | | (substituted on) 65' |
| LK | 19 | Marius Antonescu |
| FL | 20 | Andrei Gorcioaia | | (substituted on) 71' |
| SH | 21 | Tudorel Bratu |
| CE | 22 | Florin Popa |
| FB | 23 | Marius Simionescu | | (substituted on) 77' |
Coach:
(Wales) Lynn Howells

Touch judges:
Andrew Brace (Ireland)
Ben Whitehouse (Wales)

Notes:

- Canada hosted Romania for the first time.
- Ryan Ackerman (Canada) and Marius Simionescu (Romania) made their international debuts.
- Aaron Carpenter surpassed Al Charron's record of 76 caps to become Canada's most capped player.

17 June 2017
19:00 EDT (UTC-04)

| United States | 17–21 | Georgia |
| Try: Augspurger 57' c Jensen 72' c Con: MacGinty (2/2) 58', 73'; Pen: MacGinty (1/1) 16' | Report | Try: Kvirikashvili 9' m Penalty try 40'; Pen: Kvirikashvili (3/5) 23', 28', 43' |

Fifth Third Bank Stadium, Kennesaw
Referee: Federico Anselmi (Argentina)

Team details

| FB | 15 | Mike Te'o |
| RW | 14 | Matai Leuta | | (substituted off) 40' | (substituted on) 50' |
| OC | 13 | Bryce Campbell | | (substituted off) 69' |
| IC | 12 | AJ MacGinty |
| LW | 11 | Nate Augspurger |
| FH | 10 | Will Magie | | (substituted off) 53' |
| SH | 9 | Shaun Davies | | (substituted off) 60' |
| N8 | 8 | Cam Dolan | | (substituted off) 53' |
| OF | 7 | Tony Lamborn |
| BF | 6 | Todd Clever (c) | | (substituted off) 65' |
| RL | 5 | Ben Landry |
| LL | 4 | Nate Brakeley |
| TP | 3 | Chris Baumann | (yellow card) 40' to 50' | | (substituted off) 50' |
| HK | 2 | James Hilterbrand | | (substituted off) 53' |
| LP | 1 | Anthony Purpura | | (substituted off) 40' |
Replacements:
| HK | 16 | Peter Malcolm | | (substituted on) 53' |
| PR | 17 | Ben Tarr | | (substituted on) 40' |
| PR | 18 | Dino Waldren | | (substituted on) 40' |
| LK | 19 | Matthew Jensen | | (substituted on) 65' |
| FL | 20 | Andrew Durutalo | | (substituted on) 53' |
| FH | 21 | Ben Cima | | (substituted on) 69' |
| CE | 22 | Marcel Brache | | (substituted on) 53' |
| WG | 23 | Ryan Matyas | | (substituted on) 60' |
Coach:
(New Zealand) John Mitchell

| FB | 15 | Merab Kvirikashvili |
| RW | 14 | Giorgi Koshadze |
| OC | 13 | Davit Kacharava |
| IC | 12 | Merab Sharikadze (c) |
| LW | 11 | Alexander Todua |
| FH | 10 | Lasha Khmaladze | | (substituted off) 73' |
| SH | 9 | Vasil Lobzhanidze | | (substituted off) 60' |
| N8 | 8 | Beka Bitsadze |
| OF | 7 | Viktor Kolelishvili | | (substituted off) 55' |
| BF | 6 | Lasha Lomidze |
| RL | 5 | Konstantin Mikautadze | | (substituted off) 50' |
| LL | 4 | Giorgi Nemsadze | | (substituted off) 63' |
| TP | 3 | Levan Chilachava | | (substituted off) 40' |
| HK | 2 | Jaba Bregvadze | | (substituted off) 50' |
| LP | 1 | Mikheil Nariashvili | | (substituted off) 69' |
Replacements:
| HK | 16 | Shalva Mamukashvili | | (substituted on) 50' |
| PR | 17 | Tornike Mataradze | | (substituted on) 69' |
| PR | 18 | Soso Bekoshvili | | (substituted on) 40' |
| LK | 19 | Giorgi Chkhaidze | | (substituted on) 50' |
| FL | 20 | Otar Giorgadze | | (substituted on) 63' |
| SH | 21 | Giorgi Begadze | | (substituted on) 60' |
| FH | 22 | Lasha Malaghuradze | | (substituted on) 73' |
| FL | 23 | Giorgi Tsutskiridze | (yellow card) 65' to 75' | (substituted on) 55' |
Coach:
(New Zealand) Milton Haig

Touch judges:
Luke Pearce (England)
Chris Assmus (Canada)
Television match official:
Neil Paterson (Scotland)

Notes:

- Konstantin Mikautadze (Georgia) earned his 50th test cap.

=== 23–24 June ===
23 June 2017
19:30 WST (UTC+13)

| Samoa | 17–19 | Wales |
| Try: Leiua 3' c Leiataua 52' c Con: Pisi (2/2) 4', 53'; Pen: Pisi (1/2) 9' | Report | Try: Evans (2) 41' m, 73' m Pen: S. Davies (3/4) 12', 19', 37' |

Apia Park, Apia
Referee: Marius van der Westhuizen (South Africa)

Team details

| FB | 15 | D'Angelo Leuila |
| RW | 14 | Alapati Leiua |
| OC | 13 | Kieron Fonotia |
| IC | 12 | Rey Lee-Lo |
| LW | 11 | David Lemi (c) | (substituted off) 75' |
| FH | 10 | Tusi Pisi |
| SH | 9 | Kahn Fotuali'i |
| N8 | 8 | Alafoti Fa'osiliva | (substituted off) 48' |
| OF | 7 | Galu Taufale | (substituted off) 59' |
| BF | 6 | Piula Faʻasalele |
| RL | 5 | Fa'atiga Lemalu |
| LL | 4 | Chris Vui |
| TP | 3 | Paul Alo-Emile | (substituted off) 77' |
| HK | 2 | Manu Leiataua | (substituted off) 68' |
| LP | 1 | Viliamu Afatia | (substituted off) 59' |
Replacements:
| HK | 16 | Seilala Lam | (substituted on) 68' |
| PR | 17 | Nephi Leatigaga | (substituted on) 59' |
| PR | 18 | Bronson Tauakipulu | (substituted on) 77' |
| FL | 19 | Faifili Levave | (substituted on) 48' |
| N8 | 20 | Sanele Vavae Tuilagi | (substituted on) 59' |
| SH | 21 | Dwayne Polataivao |
| CE | 22 | Henry Taefu |
| FH | 23 | Tila Mealoi | (substituted on) 75' |
Coach:
(New Zealand) Alama Ieremia

| FB | 15 | Gareth Anscombe |
| RW | 14 | Cory Allen |
| OC | 13 | Tyler Morgan | (substituted off) 59' |
| IC | 12 | Jamie Roberts (c) |
| LW | 11 | Steff Evans |
| FH | 10 | Sam Davies |
| SH | 9 | Aled Davies |
| N8 | 8 | Josh Navidi |
| OF | 7 | Ellis Jenkins |
| BF | 6 | Aaron Shingler | (substituted off) 64' |
| RL | 5 | Rory Thornton |
| LL | 4 | Seb Davies | (substituted off) 48' |
| TP | 3 | Dillon Lewis | (substituted off) 64' |
| HK | 2 | Ryan Elias | (substituted off) 56' |
| LP | 1 | Nicky Smith | (substituted off) 56' |
Replacements:
| HK | 16 | Scott Baldwin | (substituted on) 56' |
| PR | 17 | Wyn Jones | (substituted on) 56' |
| PR | 18 | Rhodri Jones | (substituted on) 64' |
| LK | 19 | Adam Beard | (substituted on) 48' |
| FL | 20 | Thomas Young | (substituted on) 64' |
| SH | 21 | Tomos Williams |
| FH | 22 | Owen Williams |
| CE | 23 | Scott Williams | (substituted on) 59' |
Coach:
(Wales) Robin McBryde

Touch judges:
Mike Fraser (New Zealand)
Rohan Hoffmann (Australia)

Notes:

- Tila Mealoi, Bronson Tauakipulu and Galu Taufale (all Samoa) and Adam Beard and Rory Thornton (both Wales) made their international debuts.
- Wales beat Samoa for the first time since their 17–10 win during the 2011 Rugby World Cup; it was their first win in Samoa since winning 32–14 in 1986.
- Wales won all their June test matches for the first time since beating Canada and the United States during their 2009 tour.

24 June 2017
14:30 FJT (UTC+12)

| Fiji | 27–22 | Scotland |
| Try: Yato 37' m Seniloli 62' c Con: Volavola (1/2) 63'; Pen: Volavola (5/6) 25', 36', 46', 56', 68' | Report | Try: Ford 30' c Jackson 53' c Brown 75' m Con: Jackson (2/3) 31', 54'; Pen: Jackson (1/1) 61' |

ANZ National Stadium, Suva
Referee: Pascal Gaüzère (France)

Team details

| FB | 15 | Kini Murimurivalu |
| RW | 14 | Josua Tuisova |
| OC | 13 | Albert Vulivuli | | (substituted off) 77' |
| IC | 12 | Jale Vatubua | | (substituted off) 70' |
| LW | 11 | Patrick Osborne |
| FH | 10 | Ben Volavola |
| SH | 9 | Serupepeli Vularika | | (substituted off) 57' |
| N8 | 8 | Akapusi Qera (c) | | (substituted off) 65' |
| OF | 7 | Peceli Yato |
| BF | 6 | Dominiko Waqaniburotu | | (substituted off) 34' | (substituted on) 39' |
| RL | 5 | Leone Nakarawa |
| LL | 4 | Tevita Cavubati | (yellow card) 15' to 25' | (substituted off) 70' |
| TP | 3 | Kalivati Tawake | | (substituted off) 79' |
| HK | 2 | Sunia Koto | | (substituted off) 51' |
| LP | 1 | Peni Ravai | (yellow card) 29' to 39' | | | (substituted off) 60' |
Replacements:
| HK | 16 | Talemaitoga Tuapati | | (substituted on) 51' |
| PR | 17 | Joeli Veitayaki Jr. | | (substituted on) 34' | (substituted off) 39' | (substituted on) 60' |
| PR | 18 | Mosese Ducivaki | | (substituted on) 79' |
| LK | 19 | Sikeli Nabou | | (substituted on) 70' |
| FL | 20 | Naulia Dawai | | (substituted on) 65' |
| SH | 21 | Henry Seniloli | | (substituted on) 57' |
| CE | 22 | John Stewart | | (substituted on) 70' |
| WG | 23 | Benito Masilevu | | (substituted on) 77' |
Coach:
(New Zealand) John McKee

| FB | 15 | Ruaridh Jackson |
| RW | 14 | Damien Hoyland |
| OC | 13 | Nick Grigg |
| IC | 12 | Duncan Taylor | | (substituted off) 40' |
| LW | 11 | Tim Visser |
| FH | 10 | Peter Horne |
| SH | 9 | Henry Pyrgos | | (substituted off) 65' |
| N8 | 8 | Josh Strauss | (yellow card) 21' to 31' | (substituted off) 70' |
| OF | 7 | John Hardie | | (substituted off) 52' |
| BF | 6 | John Barclay (c) | | (substituted off) 57' |
| RL | 5 | Jonny Gray |
| LL | 4 | Tim Swinson |
| TP | 3 | WP Nel | | (substituted off) 50' |
| HK | 2 | Ross Ford | | (substituted off) 50' |
| LP | 1 | Alex Allan | | (substituted off) 40' |
Replacements:
| HK | 16 | Fraser Brown | | (substituted on) 50' |
| PR | 17 | Gordon Reid | | (substituted on) 40' |
| PR | 18 | Zander Fagerson | | (substituted on) 50' |
| LK | 19 | Ben Toolis | | (substituted on) 70' |
| FL | 20 | Hamish Watson | | (substituted on) 52' |
| N8 | 21 | Ryan Wilson | | (substituted on) 57' |
| SH | 22 | Ali Price | | (substituted on) 65' |
| FB | 23 | Greig Tonks | | (substituted on) 40' |
Coach:
(Scotland) Gregor Townsend

Touch judges:
Will Houston (Australia)
Damon Murphy (Australia)

Notes:

- Mosese Ducivaki, Sikeli Nabou, John Stewart and Josua Tuisova (all Fiji) and Nick Grigg (Scotland) made their international debuts.
- Ross Ford surpassed Chris Paterson's record of 109 caps to become Scotland's most capped player.
- Fiji beat Scotland for the second time, after winning 51–26 in Suva in 1998.
- Fiji beat two Tier 1 nations in a single year for the first time, having also beaten Italy 22–19.

24 June 2017
15:00 AEST (UTC+10)

| Australia | 40–27 | Italy |
| Try: Naivalu (2) 13' c, 43' c Folau (2) 16' c, 29' c Foley 76' c Hodge 79' m Con: Foley (5/6) 14', 18', 31', 44', 78' | Report | Try: Campagnaro 34' c Padovani 63' c Benvenuti 67' c Con: Allan (3/3) 36', 64', 68'; Pen: Allan (2/2) 1', 27' |

Lang Park, Brisbane
Attendance: 21,849
Referee: Matthew Carley (England)

Team details

| FB | 15 | Israel Folau |
| RW | 14 | Dane Haylett-Petty |
| OC | 13 | Rob Horne | | (substituted off) 65' |
| IC | 12 | Karmichael Hunt |
| LW | 11 | Sefa Naivalu | | (substituted off) 48' |
| FH | 10 | Bernard Foley |
| SH | 9 | Will Genia | | (substituted off) 78' |
| N8 | 8 | Lopeti Timani |
| OF | 7 | Michael Hooper |
| BF | 6 | Ned Hanigan |
| RL | 5 | Adam Coleman | | (substituted off) 61' |
| LL | 4 | Rory Arnold | | (substituted off) 69' |
| TP | 3 | Allan Alaalatoa | | (substituted off) 56' |
| HK | 2 | Stephen Moore (c) | | (substituted off) 49' |
| LP | 1 | Scott Sio | | (substituted off) 48' |
Replacements:
| HK | 16 | Tatafu Polota-Nau | | (substituted on) 49' |
| PR | 17 | Toby Smith | (yellow card) 73' to 80' | (substituted on) 48' |
| PR | 18 | Sekope Kepu | | (substituted on) 56' |
| LK | 19 | Sam Carter | | (substituted on) 61' |
| FL | 20 | Jack Dempsey | | (substituted on) 69' |
| SH | 21 | Joe Powell | | (substituted on) 78' |
| FH | 22 | Quade Cooper | | (substituted on) 65' |
| CE | 23 | Reece Hodge | | (substituted on) 48' |
Coach:
(Australia) Michael Cheika

| FB | 15 | Edoardo Padovani |
| RW | 14 | Angelo Esposito | | (substituted off) 50' |
| OC | 13 | Michele Campagnaro |
| IC | 12 | Tommaso Boni | | | | (substituted off) 78' |
| LW | 11 | Giovanbattista Venditti |
| FH | 10 | Tommaso Allan | | (substituted off) 53' | (substituted on) 58' |
| SH | 9 | Tito Tebaldi | | (substituted off) 59' |
| N8 | 8 | Dries van Schalkwyk |
| OF | 7 | Maxime Mbanda | | (substituted off) 56' |
| BF | 6 | Francesco Minto (c) |
| RL | 5 | Dean Budd |
| LL | 4 | Marco Fuser | | (substituted off) 65' |
| TP | 3 | Simone Ferrari | | (substituted off) 78' |
| HK | 2 | Luca Bigi | | (substituted off) 56' |
| LP | 1 | Andrea Lovotti | | (substituted off) 65' |
Replacements:
| HK | 16 | Ornel Gega | | (substituted on) 56' |
| PR | 17 | Federico Zani | | (substituted on) 65' |
| PR | 18 | Pietro Ceccarelli | | (substituted on) 78' |
| LK | 19 | Marco Lazzaroni | | (substituted on) 56' |
| N8 | 20 | Braam Steyn | (yellow card) 75' to 80' | (substituted on) 65' |
| SH | 21 | Edoardo Gori | | (substituted on) 59' |
| FH | 22 | Carlo Canna | | (substituted on) 53' | (substituted off) 58' | (substituted on) 78' |
| CE | 23 | Tommaso Benvenuti | | (substituted on) 50' |
Coach:
(Ireland) Conor O'Shea

Man of the Match:
Israel Folau (Australia)

Touch judges:
Wayne Barnes (England)
Brendon Pickerill (New Zealand)
Television match official:
Ben Skeen (New Zealand)

Notes:

- Jack Dempsey (Australia) and Marco Lazzaroni (Italy) made their international debuts.

24 June 2017
14:40 JST (UTC+09)

| Japan | 13–35 | Ireland |
| Try: Matsushima 23' m Yamada 61' m Pen: Ogura (1/1) 14' | Report | Try: Ringrose 2' c Van Der Flier 10' c Marmion 16' c Ruddock 30' c Reidy 77' c Con: Jackson (5/5) 3', 11', 18', 31', 78' |

Ajinomoto Stadium, Chōfu
Attendance: 29,354
Referee: JP Doyle (England)

Team details

| FB | 15 | Ryuji Noguchi | (substituted off) 67' |
| RW | 14 | Akihito Yamada |
| OC | 13 | Kotaro Matsushima | (substituted off) 67' |
| IC | 12 | Yu Tamura |
| LW | 11 | Kenki Fukuoka |
| FH | 10 | Jumpei Ogura | (substituted off) 40' |
| SH | 9 | Yutaka Nagare | (substituted off) 52' |
| N8 | 8 | Amanaki Mafi |
| OF | 7 | Shuhei Matsuhashi |
| BF | 6 | Michael Leitch (c) |
| RL | 5 | Uwe Helu | (substituted off) 63' |
| LL | 4 | Luke Thompson |
| TP | 3 | Takuma Asahara | (substituted off) 40' |
| HK | 2 | Yusuke Niwai | (substituted off) 40' |
| LP | 1 | Shintaro Ishihara | (substituted off) 47' |
Replacements:
| HK | 16 | Shota Horie | (substituted on) 40' |
| PR | 17 | Keita Inagaki | (substituted on) 47' |
| PR | 18 | Takayuki Watanabe | (substituted on) 40' |
| LK | 19 | Kotaro Yatabe | (substituted on) 63' |
| FL | 20 | Yoshitaka Tokunaga | (substituted on) 67' |
| SH | 21 | Fumiaki Tanaka | (substituted on) 52' |
| FH | 22 | Rikiya Matsuda | (substituted on) 40' |
| CE | 23 | Ryohei Yamanaka | (substituted on) 67' |
Coach:
(New Zealand) Jamie Joseph

| FB | 15 | Andrew Conway |
| RW | 14 | Keith Earls | (substituted off) 54' |
| OC | 13 | Garry Ringrose | (substituted off) 78' |
| IC | 12 | Luke Marshall |
| LW | 11 | Jacob Stockdale |
| FH | 10 | Paddy Jackson |
| SH | 9 | Kieran Marmion | (substituted off) 72' |
| N8 | 8 | Jack Conan |
| OF | 7 | Josh Van Der Flier | | | (substituted off) 67' |
| BF | 6 | Rhys Ruddock (c) | (substituted off) 54' | (substituted on) 60' |
| RL | 5 | Devin Toner |
| LL | 4 | Kieran Treadwell | (substituted off) 51' |
| TP | 3 | John Ryan | (substituted off) 60' |
| HK | 2 | James Tracy | (substituted off) 51' |
| LP | 1 | Cian Healy | (substituted off) 60' |
Replacements:
| HK | 16 | Niall Scannell | (substituted on) 51' |
| PR | 17 | Dave Kilcoyne | (substituted on) 60' |
| PR | 18 | Andrew Porter | (substituted on) 60' |
| LK | 19 | James Ryan | (substituted on) 51' |
| FL | 20 | Sean Reidy | (substituted on) 54' | (substituted off) 60' | (substituted on) 67' |
| SH | 21 | John Cooney | (substituted on) 72' |
| CE | 22 | Rory Scannell | (substituted on) 78' |
| FB | 23 | Tiernan O'Halloran | (substituted on) 54' |
Coach:
(New Zealand) Joe Schmidt

Touch judges:
Mathieu Raynal (France)
Alexandre Ruiz (France)
Television match official:
Glenn Newman (New Zealand)

Notes:

- John Cooney (Ireland) made his international debut.
- Michael Leitch (Japan) and Devin Toner (Ireland) earned their 50th test cap.

24 June 2017
19:35 NZST (UTC+12)

| New Zealand | 30–15 | British & Irish Lions |
| Try: Taylor 17' c Ioane (2) 54' c, 69' c Con: B. Barrett (3/3) 19', 55', 71'; Pen: B. Barrett (3/3) 13', 33', 60' | Report | Try: O'Brien 35' m Webb 80' c Con: Farrell (1/2) 80'; Pen: Farrell (1/1) 30' |

Eden Park, Auckland
Attendance: 48,181
Referee: Jaco Peyper (South Africa)

Team details

| FB | 15 | Ben Smith | (substituted off) 26' |
| RW | 14 | Israel Dagg |
| OC | 13 | Ryan Crotty | (substituted off) 33' |
| IC | 12 | Sonny Bill Williams |
| LW | 11 | Rieko Ioane |
| FH | 10 | Beauden Barrett |
| SH | 9 | Aaron Smith | (substituted off) 55' |
| N8 | 8 | Kieran Read (c) | (substituted off) 76' |
| OF | 7 | Sam Cane |
| BF | 6 | Jerome Kaino | (substituted off) 46' |
| RL | 5 | Sam Whitelock |
| LL | 4 | Brodie Retallick |
| TP | 3 | Owen Franks | (substituted off) 53' |
| HK | 2 | Codie Taylor | (substituted off) 66' |
| LP | 1 | Joe Moody | (substituted off) 53' |
Replacements:
| HK | 16 | Nathan Harris | (substituted on) 66' |
| PR | 17 | Wyatt Crockett | (substituted on) 53' |
| PR | 18 | Charlie Faumuina | (substituted on) 53' |
| LK | 19 | Scott Barrett | (substituted on) 76' |
| FL | 20 | Ardie Savea | (substituted on) 46' |
| SH | 21 | TJ Perenara | (substituted on) 55' |
| FH | 22 | Aaron Cruden | (substituted on) 26' |
| CE | 23 | Anton Lienert-Brown | (substituted on) 33' |
Coach:
(New Zealand) Steve Hansen

| FB | 15 | (Wales) Liam Williams | (substituted off) 71' |
| RW | 14 | (England) Anthony Watson |
| OC | 13 | (Wales) Jonathan Davies |
| IC | 12 | (England) Ben Te'o | (substituted off) 56' |
| LW | 11 | (England) Elliot Daly |
| FH | 10 | (England) Owen Farrell |
| SH | 9 | (Ireland) Conor Murray | (substituted off) 67' |
| N8 | 8 | (Wales) Taulupe Faletau |
| OF | 7 | (Ireland) Seán O'Brien |
| BF | 6 | (Ireland) Peter O'Mahony (c) | (substituted off) 53' |
| RL | 5 | (England) George Kruis |
| LL | 4 | (Wales) Alun Wyn Jones | (substituted off) 47' |
| TP | 3 | (Ireland) Tadhg Furlong | (substituted off) 58' |
| HK | 2 | (England) Jamie George | (substituted off) 67' |
| LP | 1 | (England) Mako Vunipola | (substituted off) 51' |
Replacements:
| HK | 16 | (Wales) Ken Owens | (substituted on) 67' |
| PR | 17 | (Ireland) Jack McGrath | (substituted on) 51' |
| PR | 18 | (England) Kyle Sinckler | (substituted on) 58' |
| LK | 19 | (England) Maro Itoje | (substituted on) 47' |
| FL | 20 | (Wales) Sam Warburton | (substituted on) 53' |
| SH | 21 | (Wales) Rhys Webb | (substituted on) 67' |
| FH | 22 | (Ireland) Johnny Sexton | (substituted on) 56' |
| FB | 23 | (Wales) Leigh Halfpenny | (substituted on) 71' |
Coach:
(New Zealand) Warren Gatland

Touch judges:
Romain Poite (France)
Jérôme Garcès (France)
Television match official:
George Ayoub (Australia)

24 June 2017
17:00 SAST (UTC+02)

| South Africa | 35–12 | France |
| Try: J.A. Kriel 6' c Etzebeth 41' m Marx 61' c Paige 74' c Con: Jantjies (3/4) 6', 61', 75'; Pen: Jantjies (3/4) 5', 22', 39' | Report | Pen: Plisson (4/5) 11', 15', 40', 57' |

Ellis Park Stadium, Johannesburg
Attendance: 55,820
Referee: Angus Gardner (Australia)

Team details

| FB | 15 | Andries Coetzee |
| RW | 14 | Raymond Rhule | (substituted off) 71' |
| OC | 13 | Jesse Kriel | (substituted off) 71' |
| IC | 12 | Jan Serfontein |
| LW | 11 | Courtnall Skosan |
| FH | 10 | Elton Jantjies |
| SH | 9 | Francois Hougaard | (substituted off) 71' |
| N8 | 8 | Jean-Luc du Preez | (substituted off) 55' |
| OF | 7 | Jaco Kriel |
| BF | 6 | Siya Kolisi |
| RL | 5 | Franco Mostert | (substituted off) 67' |
| LL | 4 | Eben Etzebeth (c) |
| TP | 3 | Ruan Dreyer | (substituted off) 55' |
| HK | 2 | Malcolm Marx | (substituted off) 67' |
| LP | 1 | Tendai Mtawarira | (substituted off) 55' |
Replacements:
| HK | 16 | Bongi Mbonambi | (substituted on) 67' |
| PR | 17 | Steven Kitshoff | (substituted on) 55' |
| PR | 18 | Coenie Oosthuizen | (substituted on) 55' |
| LK | 19 | Pieter-Steph du Toit | (substituted on) 55' |
| LK | 20 | Lood de Jager | (substituted on) 67' |
| SH | 21 | Rudy Paige | (substituted on) 71' |
| FH | 22 | François Steyn | (substituted on) 71' |
| WG | 23 | Dillyn Leyds | (substituted on) 71' |
Coach:
(South Africa) Allister Coetzee

| FB | 15 | Brice Dulin |
| RW | 14 | Nans Ducuing |
| OC | 13 | Damian Penaud | (substituted off) 64' |
| IC | 12 | Gaël Fickou |
| LW | 11 | Virimi Vakatawa | (substituted off) 77' |
| FH | 10 | Jules Plisson |
| SH | 9 | Baptiste Serin | (substituted off) 71' |
| N8 | 8 | Louis Picamoles | (substituted off) 70' |
| OF | 7 | Kevin Gourdon |
| BF | 6 | Yacouba Camara | (substituted off) 40' |
| RL | 5 | Romain Taofifénua | (substituted off) 64' |
| LL | 4 | Yoann Maestri |
| TP | 3 | Rabah Slimani | (substituted off) 58' | (substituted on) 70' |
| HK | 2 | Guilhem Guirado (c) |
| LP | 1 | Jefferson Poirot | (substituted off) 68' |
Replacements:
| HK | 16 | Clément Maynadier | (substituted on) 70' |
| PR | 17 | Xavier Chiocci | (substituted on) 68' |
| PR | 18 | Uini Atonio | (substituted on) 58' | (substituted off) 70' |
| LK | 19 | Paul Jedrasiak | (substituted on) 64' |
| FL | 20 | Loann Goujon | (substituted on) 40' |
| SH | 21 | Maxime Machenaud | (substituted on) 71' |
| FH | 22 | François Trinh-Duc | (substituted on) 64' |
| WG | 23 | Vincent Rattez | (substituted on) 77' |
Coach:
(France) Guy Novès

Touch judges:
Ben O'Keeffe (New Zealand)
Glen Jackson (New Zealand)
Television match official:
Rowan Kitt (England)

Notes:

- Ruan Dreyer (South Africa) made his international debut.

24 June 2017
19:00 EEST (UTC+03)

| Romania | 56–5 | Brazil |
| Try: Gorcioaia (3) 4' c, 10' c, 57' c Rădoi (3) 16' c, 30' c, 69' c Macovei 23' c Popârlan 78' c Con: Samoa (7/7) 5', 11', 17', 24', 31', 58', 70'; Vlaicu (1/1) 79' | Report | Try: Arruda 45' m |

Stadionul Arcul de Triumf, Bucharest
Referee: Shota Tevzadze (Georgia)

Team details

| FB | 15 | Marius Simionescu |
| RW | 14 | Tangimana Fonovai |
| OC | 13 | Paula Kinikinilau |
| IC | 12 | Sione Faka'osilea |
| LW | 11 | Jack Cobden | | (substituted off) 62' |
| FH | 10 | Luke Samoa | | (substituted off) 75' |
| SH | 9 | Florin Surugiu | | (substituted off) 53' |
| N8 | 8 | Mihai Macovei (c) | | (substituted off) 70' |
| OF | 7 | Vlad Nistor |
| BF | 6 | Andrei Gorcioaia |
| RL | 5 | Marius Antonescu | (yellow card) 40' to 50' | (substituted off) 66' |
| LL | 4 | Johannes van Heerden |
| TP | 3 | Andrei Ursache | | (substituted off) 35' | (substituted on) 72' |
| HK | 2 | Andrei Rădoi | | (substituted off) 72' |
| LP | 1 | Ionel Badiu | | (substituted off) 46' |
Replacements:
| PR | 16 | Ovidiu Cojocaru | | (substituted on) 72' |
| HK | 17 | Constantin Pristăviță | | (substituted on) 46' |
| PR | 18 | Alex Gordaș | | (substituted on) 35' | (substituted off) 72' |
| LK | 19 | Valentin Popârlan | | (substituted on) 66' |
| FL | 20 | Viorel Lucaci | | (substituted on) 70' |
| SH | 21 | Tudorel Bratu | | (substituted on) 53' |
| FH | 22 | Florin Vlaicu | | (substituted on) 75' |
| WG | 23 | Ionuț Dumitru | | (substituted on) 62' |
Coach:
(Wales) Lynn Howells

| FB | 15 | Daniel Sancery |
| RW | 14 | Laurent Bourda-Couhet |
| OC | 13 | Felipe Sancery |
| IC | 12 | Moisés Duque |
| LW | 11 | De Wet van Niekerk |
| FH | 10 | Josh Reeves |
| SH | 9 | Lucas Duque | | (substituted off) 59' |
| N8 | 8 | André Arruda |
| OF | 7 | Artur Bergo | | (substituted off) 59' |
| BF | 6 | João Luiz da Ros | (yellow card) 40' to 50' | (substituted off) 70' |
| RL | 5 | Gabriel Paganini | | (substituted off) 59' |
| LL | 4 | Cléber Dias |
| TP | 3 | Pedro Bengaló | | (substituted off) 40' |
| HK | 2 | Yan Rosetti (c) |
| LP | 1 | Jonatas Paulo | | (substituted off) 35' |
Replacements:
| HK | 16 | Endy Willian |
| PR | 17 | Lucas Abud | | (substituted on) 35' |
| PR | 18 | Matheus Rocha | | (substituted on) 40' |
| FL | 19 | Matheus Wolf | | (substituted on) 59' |
| N8 | 20 | Nick Smith | | (substituted on) 70' |
| FL | 21 | Matheus Daniel | | (substituted on) 59' |
| WG | 22 | Robert Tenório | | (substituted on) 59' |
| FB | 23 | Guilherme Coghetto |
Coach:
(Argentina) Rodolfo Ambrosio

Touch judges:
Ionut Bodea (Romania)
Cristian Serban (Romania)

Notes:

- This was the first match between the two nations.
- Ovidiu Cojocaru (Romania) made his international debut.

24 June 2017
16:15 ART (UTC-03)

| Argentina | 45–29 | Georgia |
| Try: Creevy 32' c Tuculet 36' c Moyano (3) 42' c, 52' c, 55' m Con: Sánchez (4/5) 33', 37', 43', 52'; Pen: Sánchez (4/5) 3', 15', 23', 26' | Report | Try: Kacharava 38' m Penalty try 50'; Matiashvili 67' c Mamukashvili 78' c Con: Matiashvili (2/2) 68', 79'; Pen: Kvirikashvili (1/1) 19' |

Estadio 23 de Agosto, Jujuy
Referee: Luke Pearce (England)

Team details

| FB | 15 | Joaquín Tuculet |
| RW | 14 | Matías Moroni |
| OC | 13 | Matías Orlando | | (substituted off) 53' | (substituted on) 66' |
| IC | 12 | Jerónimo de la Fuente |
| LW | 11 | Ramiro Moyano | (yellow card) 20' to 30' | | (substituted off) 66' |
| FH | 10 | Nicolás Sánchez | | (substituted off) 59' |
| SH | 9 | Martín Landajo | | (substituted off) 59' |
| N8 | 8 | Leonardo Senatore | | (substituted off) 50' |
| OF | 7 | Rodrigo Báez |
| BF | 6 | Tomás Lezana | | (substituted off) 16' |
| RL | 5 | Matías Alemanno |
| LL | 4 | Guido Petti |
| TP | 3 | Enrique Pieretto | | (substituted off) 50' |
| HK | 2 | Agustín Creevy (c) | | (substituted off) 40' |
| LP | 1 | Nahuel Tetaz Chaparro | | (substituted off) 51' |
Replacements:
| HK | 16 | Julián Montoya | | (substituted on) 40' |
| PR | 17 | Lucas Noguera Paz | | (substituted on) 51' |
| PR | 18 | Ramiro Herrera | | (substituted on) 50' |
| FL | 19 | Pablo Matera | | (substituted on) 16' |
| N8 | 20 | Benjamín Macome | | (substituted on) 50' |
| SH | 21 | Gonzalo Bertranou | | (substituted on) 59' |
| FH | 22 | Santiago González Iglesias | | (substituted on) 59' |
| WG | 23 | Germán Schulz | | (substituted on) 53' |
Coach:
(Argentina) Daniel Hourcade

| FB | 15 | Merab Kvirikashvili | (substituted off) 47' |
| RW | 14 | Tamaz Mchedlidze |
| OC | 13 | Davit Kacharava |
| IC | 12 | Merab Sharikadze (c) |
| LW | 11 | Alexander Todua |
| FH | 10 | Lasha Khmaladze |
| SH | 9 | Vasil Lobzhanidze | (substituted off) 53' |
| N8 | 8 | Lasha Lomidze |
| OF | 7 | Viktor Kolelishvili | | | (substituted off) 56' |
| BF | 6 | Otar Giorgadze | 13' to 20' | | (substituted off) 48' |
| RL | 5 | Konstantin Mikautadze |
| LL | 4 | Giorgi Nemsadze | (substituted off) 69' |
| TP | 3 | Soso Bekoshvili | (substituted off) 60' |
| HK | 2 | Jaba Bregvadze | (substituted off) 53' |
| LP | 1 | Mikheil Nariashvili | (substituted off) 53' |
Replacements:
| HK | 16 | Shalva Mamukashvili | (substituted on) 53' |
| PR | 17 | Tornike Mataradze | (substituted on) 53' |
| PR | 18 | Nikoloz Khatiashvili | (substituted on) 60' |
| LK | 19 | Giorgi Chkhaidze | | | (substituted on) 48' |
| FL | 20 | Giorgi Tsutskiridze | (substituted on) 13' | (substituted off) 20' | (substituted on) 56' |
| SH | 21 | Giorgi Begadze | (substituted on) 53' |
| FH | 22 | Lasha Malaghuradze | (substituted on) 69' |
| WG | 23 | Soso Matiashvili | (substituted on) 47' |
Coach:
(New Zealand) Milton Haig

Touch judges:
John Lacey (Ireland)
Egon Seconds (South Africa)
Television match official:
Aaron Paterson (New Zealand)

=== 1 July ===
1 July 2017
19:35 NZST (UTC+12)

| New Zealand | 21–24 | British & Irish Lions |
| Pen: B. Barrett (7/10) 19', 31', 36', 47', 53', 57', 66' | Report | Try: Faletau 59' m Murray 68' c Con: Farrell (1/2) 69'; Pen: Farrell (4/4) 22', 33', 40', 77' |

Wellington Regional Stadium, Wellington
Attendance: 38,931
Referee: Jérôme Garcès (France)

Team details

| FB | 15 | Israel Dagg |
| RW | 14 | Waisake Naholo | | (substituted off) 59' |
| OC | 13 | Anton Lienert-Brown |
| IC | 12 | Sonny Bill Williams | (red card) 24' |
| LW | 11 | Rieko Ioane |
| FH | 10 | Beauden Barrett |
| SH | 9 | Aaron Smith | | (substituted off) 65' |
| N8 | 8 | Kieran Read (c) |
| OF | 7 | Sam Cane | | (substituted off) 63' |
| BF | 6 | Jerome Kaino | | (substituted off) 26' |
| RL | 5 | Sam Whitelock | | (substituted off) 72' |
| LL | 4 | Brodie Retallick |
| TP | 3 | Owen Franks | | (substituted off) 52' |
| HK | 2 | Codie Taylor | | (substituted off) 79' |
| LP | 1 | Joe Moody | | (substituted off) 52' |
Replacements:
| HK | 16 | Nathan Harris | | (substituted on) 79' |
| PR | 17 | Wyatt Crockett | | (substituted on) 52' |
| PR | 18 | Charlie Faumuina | | (substituted on) 52' |
| LK | 19 | Scott Barrett | | (substituted on) 72' |
| FL | 20 | Ardie Savea | | (substituted on) 63' |
| SH | 21 | TJ Perenara | | (substituted on) 65' |
| FH | 22 | Aaron Cruden | | (substituted on) 59' |
| CE | 23 | Ngani Laumape | | (substituted on) 26' |
Coach:
(New Zealand) Steve Hansen

| FB | 15 | (Wales) Liam Williams |
| RW | 14 | (England) Anthony Watson | | (substituted off) 24' | (substituted on) 30' |
| OC | 13 | (Wales) Jonathan Davies |
| IC | 12 | (England) Owen Farrell |
| LW | 11 | (England) Elliot Daly |
| FH | 10 | (Ireland) Johnny Sexton |
| SH | 9 | (Ireland) Conor Murray |
| N8 | 8 | (Wales) Taulupe Faletau |
| OF | 7 | (Ireland) Seán O'Brien | | (substituted off) 63' | (substituted on) 65' |
| BF | 6 | (Wales) Sam Warburton (c) |
| RL | 5 | (Wales) Alun Wyn Jones | | (substituted off) 58' |
| LL | 4 | (England) Maro Itoje |
| TP | 3 | (Ireland) Tadhg Furlong | | (substituted off) 61' |
| HK | 2 | (England) Jamie George |
| LP | 1 | (England) Mako Vunipola | (yellow card) 55' to 65' | | (substituted off) 65' |
Replacements:
| HK | 16 | (Wales) Ken Owens |
| PR | 17 | (Ireland) Jack McGrath | | (substituted on) 63' |
| PR | 18 | (England) Kyle Sinckler | | (substituted on) 61' |
| LK | 19 | (England) Courtney Lawes | | (substituted on) 58' |
| FL | 20 | (Ireland) CJ Stander |
| SH | 21 | (Wales) Rhys Webb |
| CE | 22 | (England) Ben Te'o |
| WG | 23 | (England) Jack Nowell | | (substituted on) 24' | (substituted off) 30' |
Coach:
(New Zealand) Warren Gatland

Touch judges:
Jaco Peyper (South Africa)
Romain Poite (France)
Television match official:
George Ayoub (Australia)

Notes:

- Ngani Laumape (New Zealand) made his international debut.
- The British & Irish Lions beat New Zealand for the first time since winning 20–7 during their 1993 tour.
- The Lions ended New Zealand's 47-match winning streak at home, losing for the first time since their 32–29 loss to South Africa in 2009.
- New Zealand failed to score a try in a game for the first time since they drew with Australia 12–all in 2014, and failed to score a try in a home game for the first time since beating Australia 12–6 in 2002.
- Sonny Bill Williams became the first New Zealand player to be sent off since Colin Meads was dismissed against Scotland in 1967, and the first ever to be sent off at home.

=== 8 July ===
8 July 2017
19:35 NZST (UTC+12)

| New Zealand | 15–15 | British & Irish Lions |
| Try: Laumape 14' c J. Barrett 35' m Con: B. Barrett (1/2) 15'; Pen: B. Barrett (1/2) 67' | | Pen: Farrell (4/4) 20', 32', 59', 77'; Daly (1/1) 41' |

Eden Park, Auckland
Attendance: 48,609
Referee: Romain Poite (France)

Team details

| FB | 15 | Jordie Barrett |
| RW | 14 | Israel Dagg |
| OC | 13 | Anton Lienert-Brown |
| IC | 12 | Ngani Laumape | | (substituted off) 66' |
| LW | 11 | Julian Savea | | (substituted off) 72' |
| FH | 10 | Beauden Barrett |
| SH | 9 | Aaron Smith | | (substituted off) 73' |
| N8 | 8 | Kieran Read (c) |
| OF | 7 | Sam Cane | | (substituted off) 59' |
| BF | 6 | Jerome Kaino | (yellow card) 49' to 59' |
| RL | 5 | Sam Whitelock | | (substituted off) 77' |
| LL | 4 | Brodie Retallick |
| TP | 3 | Owen Franks | | (substituted off) 57' |
| HK | 2 | Codie Taylor | | (substituted off) 72' |
| LP | 1 | Joe Moody | | (substituted off) 57' |
Replacements:
| HK | 16 | Nathan Harris | | (substituted on) 72' |
| PR | 17 | Wyatt Crockett | | (substituted on) 57' |
| PR | 18 | Charlie Faumuina | | (substituted on) 57' |
| LK | 19 | Scott Barrett | | (substituted on) 77' |
| FL | 20 | Ardie Savea | | (substituted on) 59' |
| SH | 21 | TJ Perenara | | (substituted on) 73' |
| FH | 22 | Aaron Cruden | | (substituted on) 72' |
| CE | 23 | Malakai Fekitoa | | (substituted on) 66' |
Coach:
(New Zealand) Steve Hansen

| FB | 15 | (Wales) Liam Williams |
| RW | 14 | (England) Anthony Watson | (substituted off) 72' |
| OC | 13 | (Wales) Jonathan Davies |
| IC | 12 | (England) Owen Farrell |
| LW | 11 | (England) Elliot Daly |
| FH | 10 | (Ireland) Johnny Sexton | (substituted off) 48' | (substituted on) 52' | (substituted off) 72' |
| SH | 9 | (Ireland) Conor Murray | (substituted off) 69' |
| N8 | 8 | (Wales) Taulupe Faletau |
| OF | 7 | (Ireland) Seán O'Brien | (substituted off) 40' |
| BF | 6 | (Wales) Sam Warburton (c) | | (substituted off) 66' | (substituted on) 72' |
| RL | 5 | (Wales) Alun Wyn Jones | (substituted off) 49' | (substituted on) 66' | (substituted off) 72' |
| LL | 4 | (England) Maro Itoje |
| TP | 3 | (Ireland) Tadhg Furlong | (substituted off) 59' |
| HK | 2 | (England) Jamie George | (substituted off) 69' |
| LP | 1 | (England) Mako Vunipola | (substituted off) 59' |
Replacements:
| HK | 16 | (Wales) Ken Owens | (substituted on) 69' |
| PR | 17 | (Ireland) Jack McGrath | (substituted on) 59' |
| PR | 18 | (England) Kyle Sinckler | (substituted on) 59' |
| LK | 19 | (England) Courtney Lawes | (substituted on) 49' |
| FL | 20 | (Ireland) CJ Stander | (substituted on) 40' |
| SH | 21 | (Wales) Rhys Webb | (substituted on) 69' |
| CE | 22 | (England) Ben Te'o | (substituted on) 48' | (substituted off) 52' | (substituted on) 72' |
| WG | 23 | (England) Jack Nowell | (substituted on) 72' |
Coach:
(New Zealand) Warren Gatland

Man of the Match:
Jonathan Davies (British & Irish Lions) Touch judges:
Jérôme Garcès (France)
Jaco Peyper (South Africa)
Television match official:
George Ayoub (Australia)

Notes:

- Kieran Read (New Zealand) became the seventh All Black to reach 100 test caps.
- Aaron Cruden and Charlie Faumuina (both New Zealand) earned their 50th test caps.
- The Lions and New Zealand drew a test match for the first time since their 14–14 draw in 1971, and the Lions drew a test match for the first time since their 13–13 draw with South Africa in 1974.
- The British & Irish Lions drew a series with New Zealand for the first time, and drew a series for the first time since the 2–2 draw with South Africa in 1955.
- New Zealand failed to win at Eden Park for the first time since drawing 18–18 with South Africa in 1994.

== See also ==
- 2017 World Rugby Nations Cup
- 2017 World Rugby Pacific Nations Cup
- 2017 end-of-year rugby union internationals
- United States v Canada Home & Away playoffs
