= Marius Simionescu =

Romanian rugby union player

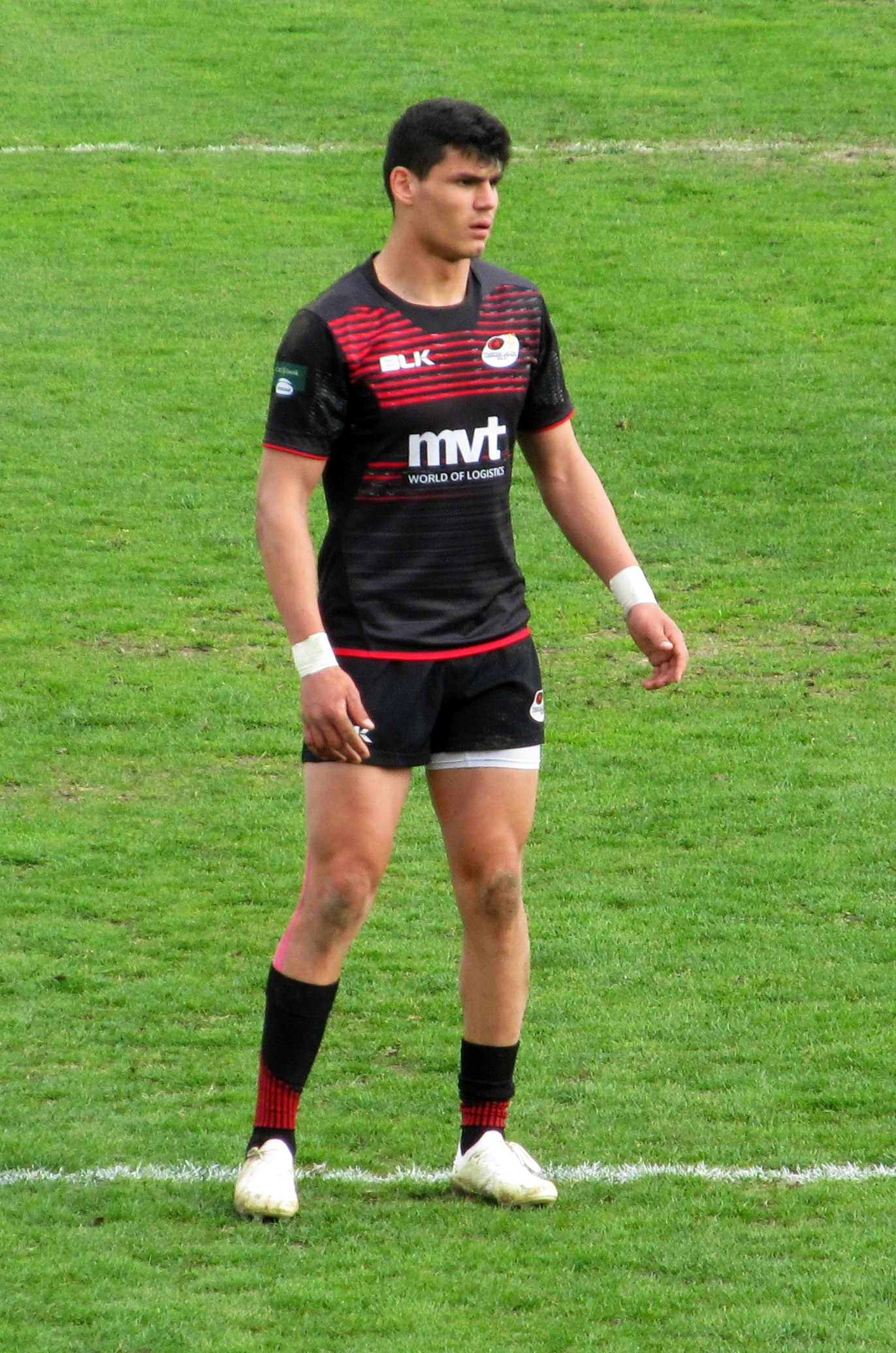
- Marius Simionescu playing for Timișoara Saracens during the 2019 Cupa României Final
- Full name: Marius Mihai Simionescu
- Born: 5 September 1997 (age 29) Erbiceni, Romania
- Height: 1.87 m (6 ft 1 1/2 in)
- Weight: 84 kg (13 st 3 lb; 185 lb)

Rugby union career
- Position: Fullback
- Current team: Timișoara Saracens
Youth career
- ?–2014: CSS Unirea Iași
- 2014–2016: Timișoara Saracens
Senior career
Years	Team	Apps	(Points)
2016–	Timișoara Saracens	13	(20)
- Correct as of 10 March 2018
International career
Years	Team	Apps	(Points)
2017–	Romania	6	(0)
- Correct as of 10 March 2018

Marius Simionescu (born 5 September 1997) is a Romanian rugby union football player. He plays as a fullback for professional SuperLiga club, Timișoara Saracens. He also plays for Romania's national team, the Oaks, making his international debut at the 2017 mid-year rugby union internationals in a match against the Canadian Canucks.

== Career ==
Before joining Timișoara Saracens' youth team, Simionescu played for CSS Unirea Iași.

== Honours ==
Timișoara Saracens

- SuperLiga: 2016–17
- Romanian Cup: 2016
