= Bronson Tauakipulu =

Samoan rugby union player

- Born: Bronson Ezrom Frazer Jr Fotuali'i-Tauakipulu; 8 January 1996 (age 30) Samoa
- Height: 188 cm (6 ft 2 in)
- Weight: 124 kg (273 lb; 19 st 7 lb)
- School: Brisbane Boys’ College
- Notable relative(s): Tiaan Tauakipulu, Murray Taulagi

Rugby union career
- Position: Prop
Senior career
Years	Team	Apps	(Points)
2019–	Queensland Country	0	(0)
- Correct as of 26 August 2019
International career
Years	Team	Apps	(Points)
2017	Samoa	1	(0)
- Correct as of 26 August 2019

Bronson Tauakipulu (born 8 January 1996 in Samoa) is a Samoan rugby union player who plays for the Queensland Country in the National Rugby Championship. His playing position is prop. He has signed for the Queensland Country squad in 2019. He is also a Samoan international.
