= Florin Popa =

Romanian politician (1954–2025)

Member of the Chamber of Deputies of Romania for Galați County
- In office 20 December 2016 – 21 December 2020

Personal details
- Born: 21 January 1954; Tecuci, Romania
- Died: 21 March 2025 (aged 71)
- Political party: PSD

Florin Popa (21 January 1954 – 21 March 2025) was a Romanian politician. A member of the Social Democratic Party, he served in the Chamber of Deputies from 2016 to 2020.

Popa died on 21 March 2025, at the age of 71.
