= Mosese Ducivaki =

- Full name: Mosese Wesele Digo Ducivaki
- Born: 28 February 1991 (age 35)
- Height: 5 ft 9 in (175 cm)
- Weight: 262 lb (119 kg)

Rugby union career
- Position: Prop
Senior career
Years	Team	Apps	(Points)
2017–19	Fijian Drua		
2020–	SCM Timișoara		
International career
Years	Team	Apps	(Points)
2017–18	Fiji	3	(0)

Mosese Wesele Digo Ducivaki (born 28 February 1991) is a Fijian rugby union player.

== Biography ==
Ducivaki comes from Ketei on Totoya island. He is a primary school teacher by profession.

A prop, Ducivaki started playing with Naitasiri in 2013 and gained a Fiji "A" call up in 2016 to compete in the World Rugby Pacific Challenge. He debuted for the Flying Fijians against Scotland in 2017 and made two further capped appearances the following year. Since 2020, Ducivaki has played his rugby in Romania for SCM Timișoara.

== See also ==
- List of Fiji national rugby union players
