= Ryan Ackerman =

Canada international rugby union player (born 1985)

- Born: August 9, 1985 (age 41) Regina, SK, Canada
- Height: 6 ft 5 in (1.96 m)
- Weight: 277 lb (126 kg)
- School: Thom Collegiate
- University: University of Regina

Rugby union career
- Position: Prop
International career
Years	Team	Apps	(Points)
2017	Canada	1	(0)

Ryan Ackerman (born August 9, 1985) is a former Canadian football and rugby union player.

== Biography ==
Ackerman is a native of Regina, Saskatchewan and attended Thom Collegiate, where he played both sports.

An offensive lineman, Ackerman played football for the University of Regina and was picked up by the Saskatchewan Roughriders in the fourth round of the 2007 CFL draft, the 28th overall selection. He was added to the Winnipeg Blue Bombers' practice roster in 2009.

Ackerman, a rugby union prop, played for the Burnaby Lake Rugby Club. He earned a Canada cap in a Test match against Romania at Ellerslie Rugby Park in Edmonton in 2017.

== See also ==
- List of Canada national rugby union players
