= 2019 Rugby World Cup warm-up matches =

In 2019, some rugby union national teams played matches in preparation for the 2019 Rugby World Cup. The matches saw New Zealand lose first place in the World Rugby Rankings, initially to Wales, and eventually to Ireland.

== Fixtures ==
=== 22 June ===
22 June 2019
19:00 UYT (UTC-03)

Uruguay	21–41	Spain
Try: Vilaseca 33' c Echeverría 55' c Inciarte 72' c Con: Vilaseca (2/2) 34', 56'; Cat (1/1) 73'	Report	Try: Munilla (2) 9' c, 44' c Domínguez 15' m Del Hoyo (2) 24' c, 40' c Mélé 77' c Con: Mélé (4/5) 10', 25', 45', 77'; Casteglioni (1/1) 40'; Pen: Mélé (1/1) 70'

Estadio Charrúa, Montevideo
Attendance: 2,200
Referee: Federico Anselmi (Argentina)

Team details

FB	15	Gastón Mieres
RW	14	Leandro Leivas
OC	13	Nicolás Freitas
IC	12	Andrés Vilaseca
LW	11	Rodrigo Silva		(substituted off) 62'
FH	10	Juan Manuel Cat
SH	9	Agustín Ormaechea		(substituted off) 44'
N8	8	Manuel Diana		(substituted off) 46'
OF	7	Santiago Civetta		(substituted off) 51'
BF	6	Juan Manuel Gaminara (c)
RL	5	Manuel Leindekar
LL	4	Ignacio Dotti		(substituted off) 66'
TP	3	Juan Rombys		(substituted off) 51'
HK	2	Germán Kessler		(substituted off) 71'
LP	1	Mateo Sanguinetti		(substituted off) 51'
Replacements:
HK	16	Guillermo Pujadas		(substituted on) 71'
PR	17	Facundo Gattas		(substituted on) 51'
PR	18	Juan Echeverría		(substituted on) 51'
LK	19	Gonzalo Soto Mera		(substituted on) 66'
FL	20	Leandro Segredo		(substituted on) 51'
FL	21	Juan Diego Ormaechea		(substituted on) 46'
SH	22	Santiago Arata	(yellow card) 53'	(substituted on) 44'
WG	23	Tomás Inciarte		(substituted on) 62'
Coach:
(Argentina) Esteban Meneses

FB	15	Federico Casteglioni
RW	14	Ignacio Contardi		(substituted off) 70'
OC	13	Richard Stewart
IC	12	Álvar Gimeno
LW	11	Guillermo Domínguez		(substituted off) 77'
FH	10	David Mélé	(yellow card) 34'
SH	9	Facundo Munilla		(substituted off) 58'
N8	8	Afa Tauli
OF	7	Juan Pablo Guido
BF	6	Victor Sánchez Borrego		(substituted off) 37'
RL	5	Michael Walter-Fitton		(substituted off) 28'	(substituted on) 39'	(substituted off) 59'
LL	4	Manuel Mora
TP	3	Alberto Blanco	(yellow card) 59'			(substituted off) 69'
HK	2	Vicente del Hoyo		(substituted off) 58'
LP	1	Fernando Martín López (c)		(substituted off) 52'
Replacements:
PR	16	Thierry Feuteu		(substituted on) 52'
HK	17	Pablo Miejimolle		(substituted on) 58'
PR	18	Mattius Pisapia				(substituted on) 59'
LK	19	Ien Ascroft-Leigh		(substituted on) 28'	(substituted off) 39'	(substituted on) 69'
FL	20	Oier Goia		(substituted on) 37'
SH	21	Emiliano Calle Rivas		(substituted on) 58'
WG	22	Jordi Jorba		(substituted on) 70'
WG	23	Julen Goia		(substituted on) 77'
Coach:
(Spain) Santiago Santos

Assistant referees:
URU Appt. (Uruguay)
URU Appt. (Uruguay)
Television match official:
UAR Appt. (Argentina)

Notes:

- Pablo Miejimolle (Spain) made his international debut.
- This was Spain's largest winning margin over Uruguay, surpassing the 17-point difference set in 2016.

=== 13 July ===
13 July 2019
15:00 FJT (UTC+12)

Fiji	27–10	Māori All Blacks
Try: Veitokani 22' c Mata 33' m Nayacalevu (2) 47' c, 72' m Con: Volavola (2/4) 23', 48'; Pen: Volavola (1/1) 45'	Report	Try: Wainui (2) 53' m, 67' m

ANZ National Stadium, Suva
Attendance: 10,000
Referee: Damon Murphy (Australia)

Team details

FB	15	Alivereti Veitokani
RW	14	Josua Tuisova
OC	13	Waisea Nayacalevu	(substituted off) 74'
IC	12	Levani Botia
LW	11	Eroni Sau
FH	10	Ben Volavola	(substituted off) 64'
SH	9	Frank Lomani	(substituted off) 62'
N8	8	Viliame Mata	(substituted off) 40'
OF	7	Semi Kunatani
BF	6	Dominiko Waqaniburotu (c)	(substituted off) 69'
RL	5	Leone Nakarawa
LL	4	Albert Tuisue
TP	3	Manasa Saulo	(substituted off) 31'	(substituted on) 74'
HK	2	Samuel Matavesi	(substituted off) 58'
LP	1	Peni Ravai	46' to 52'		(substituted off) 58'
Replacements:
HK	16	Mesu Dolokoto	(substituted on) 58'
PR	17	Eroni Mawi	(substituted on) 46'	(substituted off) 52'	(substituted on) 58'
PR	18	Kalivati Tawake	(substituted on) 31'	(substituted off) 74'
LK	19	Api Ratuniyarawa	(substituted on) 69'
N8	20	Nemani Nagusa	(substituted on) 40'
SH	21	Henry Seniloli	(substituted on) 62'
CE	22	Sevanaia Galala	(substituted on) 74'
WG	23	Patrick Osborne	(substituted on) 64'
Coach:
(New Zealand) John McKee

FB	15	Fletcher Smith		(substituted off) 74'
RW	14	Shaun Stevenson
OC	13	Rob Thompson
IC	12	Teihorangi Walden		(substituted off) 49'
LW	11	Sean Wainui
FH	10	Otere Black	(yellow card) 38'
SH	9	Te Toiroa Tahuriorangi		(substituted off) 49'
N8	8	Akira Ioane		(substituted off) 51'
OF	7	Mitch Karpik
BF	6	Reed Prinsep
RL	5	Tom Franklin
LL	4	Isaia Walker-Leawere		(substituted off) 51'
TP	3	Tyrel Lomax		(substituted off) 51'
HK	2	Ash Dixon (c)		(substituted off) 55'
LP	1	Ross Wright		7' to 17'		(substituted off) 28'	(substituted on) 40'	(substituted off) 65'
Replacements:
HK	16	Nathan Harris		(substituted on) 55'
PR	17	Haereiti Hetet		(substituted on) 7'	(substituted off) 17'	(substituted on) 28'	(substituted off) 40'	(substituted on) 65'
PR	18	Marcel Renata		(substituted on) 51'
LK	19	Pari Pari Parkinson		(substituted on) 51'
FL	20	Whetu Douglas		(substituted on) 51'
SH	21	Bryn Hall		(substituted on) 49'
CE	22	Alex Nankivell		(substituted on) 49'
WG	23	Jordan Hyland		(substituted on) 74'
Coach:
(New Zealand) Clayton McMillan

Man of the Match:
Levani Botia (Fiji)

Assistant referees:
Graham Cooper (Australia)
Jordan Way (Australia)

Notes:

- Fiji's win ended a 16-match losing streak against the Maori All Blacks, dating back to 1957.

=== 20 July ===
20 July 2019
19:35 NZST (UTC+12)

Māori All Blacks	26–17	Fiji
Try: Wainui 14' c Thompson 44' c Nankivell 60' m Walker-Leawere 64' c Con: Black (3/4) 15', 44', 65'	Report	Try: Veremalua 9' c Dyer 75' c Con: Veitokani (1/1) 10'; Matavesi (1/1) 76'; Pen: Veitokani (1/1) 52'

Rotorua International Stadium, Rotorua
Attendance: 13,404
Referee: Nic Berry (Australia)

Team details

FB	15	Shaun Stevenson
RW	14	Jordan Hyland
OC	13	Rob Thompson	(substituted off) 73'
IC	12	Alex Nankivell
LW	11	Sean Wainui
FH	10	Otere Black	(substituted off) 72'
SH	9	Bryn Hall	(substituted off) 55'
N8	8	Whetu Douglas
OF	7	Mitch Karpik	(substituted off) 53'
BF	6	Reed Prinsep
RL	5	Pari Pari Parkinson	(substituted off) 46'
LL	4	Tom Franklin
TP	3	Tyrel Lomax	(substituted off) 46'	(substituted on) 55'	(substituted off) 72'
HK	2	Ash Dixon (c)	(substituted off) 53'
LP	1	Ross Wright	(substituted off) 61'
Replacements:
HK	16	Nathan Harris	(substituted on) 53'
PR	17	Haereiti Hetet	(substituted on) 61'
PR	18	Marcel Renata	(substituted on) 46'	(substituted off) 55'	(substituted on) 72'
LK	19	Isaia Walker-Leawere	(substituted on) 46'
N8	20	Akira Ioane	(substituted on) 53'
SH	21	Te Toiroa Tahuriorangi	(substituted on) 55'
FB	22	Fletcher Smith	(substituted on) 72'
CE	23	Teihorangi Walden	(substituted on) 73'
Coach:
(New Zealand) Clayton McMillan

FB	15	Kini Murimurivalu	(substituted off) 53'
RW	14	Patrick Osborne
OC	13	Waisea Nayacalevu
IC	12	Jale Vatubua	(substituted off) 72'
LW	11	Filipo Nakosi
FH	10	Alivereti Veitokani
SH	9	Henry Seniloli	(substituted off) 61'
N8	8	Nemani Nagusa	(substituted off) 45'
OF	7	Mosese Voka
BF	6	Dominiko Waqaniburotu (c)
RL	5	Api Ratuniyarawa	(substituted off) 55'
LL	4	Tevita Ratuva
TP	3	Lee Roy Atalifo	(substituted off) 55'
HK	2	Tuvere Veremalua	(substituted off) 48'
LP	1	Campese Ma'afu	(substituted off) 63'
Replacements:
HK	16	Sam Matavesi	(substituted on) 48'
PR	17	Joeli Veitayaki Jr.	(substituted on) 63'
PR	18	Luke Tagi	(substituted on) 55'
LK	19	Albert Tuisue	(substituted on) 55'
N8	20	Johnny Dyer	(substituted on) 5'
SH	21	Seru Vularika	(substituted on) 61'
CE	22	Sevanaia Galala	(substituted on) 72'
CE	23	Josh Matavesi	(substituted on) 53'
Coach:
(New Zealand) John McKee

Assistant referees:
Damon Murphy (Australia)
Jordan Way (Australia)
Television match official:
James Leckie (Fiji)

=== 10 August ===
10 August 2019
14:00 IST (UTC+01)

Ireland	29–10	Italy
Try: Carbery 17' c Kearney 28' c Conway 37' m Murphy 44' m Marmion 62' m Con: Carbery (2/5) 18', 29'	Report	Try: Mbanda 12' m Canna 20 'm

Aviva Stadium, Dublin
Attendance: 30,000
Referee: Luke Pearce (England)

Team details

FB	15	Jordan Larmour
RW	14	Andrew Conway	(substituted off) 59'
OC	13	Garry Ringrose
IC	12	Chris Farrell
LW	11	Dave Kearney
FH	10	Joey Carbery	(substituted off) 64'
SH	9	Luke McGrath	(substituted off) 56'
N8	8	Jordi Murphy
OF	7	Tommy O'Donnell
BF	6	Rhys Ruddock (c)	(substituted off) 56'
RL	5	Jean Kleyn		62' to 70'
LL	4	Devin Toner	(substituted off) 56'	(substituted on) 62' (substituted off) 70'
TP	3	Andrew Porter	(substituted off) 70'
HK	2	Rob Herring	(substituted off) 18'
LP	1	Jack McGrath	(substituted off) 40'
Replacements:
HK	16	Niall Scannell	(substituted on) 18'
PR	17	Cian Healy	(substituted on) 70'
PR	18	John Ryan	(substituted on) 40'
LK	19	Iain Henderson	(substituted on) 56'
FL	20	Tadhg Beirne	(substituted on) 60'
SH	21	Kieran Marmion	(substituted on) 56'
FH	22	Jack Carty	(substituted on) 64'
WG	23	Mike Haley	(substituted on) 59'
Coach:
(New Zealand) Joe Schmidt

FB	15	Edoardo Padovani
RW	14	Angelo Esposito
OC	11	Giulio Bisegni
IC	13	Tommaso Benvenuti	(substituted off) 24'	(substituted on) 35'
LW	23	Matteo Minozzi			(substituted off) 40'
FH	10	Carlo Canna
SH	9	Guglielmo Palazzani	(substituted off) 51'
N8	8	Jimmy Tuivaiti	(substituted off) 49'
OF	7	Maxime Mbanda	(substituted off) 48'
BF	6	Giovanni Licata
RL	5	Dean Budd (c)
LL	4	Alessandro Zanni	(substituted off) 52'
TP	3	Marco Riccioni	(substituted off) 51'
HK	2	Oliviero Fabiani	(substituted off) 40'
LP	1	Nicola Quaglio	(substituted off) 40'
Replacements:
HK	16	Federico Zani	(substituted on) 40'
PR	17	Andrea Lovotti	(substituted on) 40'
PR	18	Simone Ferrari	(substituted on) 51'
FL	19	Marco Lazzaroni	(substituted on) 48'
FL	20	Renato Giammarioli	(substituted on) 49'
SH	21	Callum Braley	(substituted on) 51'
FH	22	Ian McKinley	(substituted on) 24'	(substituted off) 35'	(substituted on) 40'
FL	26	Sebastian Negri	(substituted on) 52'
Coach:
(Ireland) Conor O'Shea

Man of the Match:
Andrew Conway (Ireland)

Assistant referees:
Tom Foley (England)
Mike Adamson (Scotland)
Television match official:
Graham Hughes (England)

Notes:

- Mike Haley and Jean Kleyn (both Ireland) and Callum Braley and Marco Riccioni (both Italy) made their international debuts.
- Marco Zanon withdrew at the last moment due to injury, being replaced by the wing/fullback Matteo Minozzi.

=== 11 August ===
11 August 2019
14:00 BST (UTC+01)

England	33–19	Wales
Try: Vunipola 3' c Cokanasiga 12' c Cowan-Dickie 38' c Con: Ford (3/3) 4', 14', 39'; Pen: Ford (3/3) 43', 60', 72'; Drop: Daly (1/1) 76'	Report	Try: G. Davies 21' c North 49' m Wyn Jones 55' c Con: Anscombe (1/1) 23'; Biggar (1/2) 56'

Twickenham Stadium, London
Attendance: 80,944
Referee: Mathieu Raynal (France)

Team details

FB	15	Elliot Daly
RW	14	Joe Cokanasiga
OC	13	Jonathan Joseph	(substituted off) 78'
IC	12	Piers Francis	(substituted off) 73'
LW	11	Anthony Watson
FH	10	George Ford (c)
SH	9	Willi Heinz	(substituted off) 49'
N8	8	Billy Vunipola
OF	7	Tom Curry	(substituted off) 28'
BF	6	Lewis Ludlam	(substituted off) 67'
RL	5	Charlie Ewels
LL	4	Joe Launchbury	(substituted off) 78'
TP	3	Dan Cole	(substituted off) 52'
HK	2	Luke Cowan-Dickie
LP	1	Ellis Genge
Replacements:
HK	16	Jack Singleton	(substituted on) 78'
PR	17	Joe Marler
PR	18	Harry Williams	(substituted on) 52'
LK	19	George Kruis	(substituted on) 67'
FL	20	Courtney Lawes	(substituted on) 28'
SH	21	Ben Youngs	(substituted on) 49'
CE	22	Joe Marchant	(substituted on) 78'
CE	23	Manu Tuilagi	(substituted on) 73'
Coach:
(Australia) Eddie Jones

FB	15	Liam Williams
RW	14	George North
OC	13	Jonathan Davies
IC	12	Hadleigh Parkes	(substituted off) 67'
LW	11	Josh Adams
FH	10	Gareth Anscombe	(substituted off) 33'
SH	9	Gareth Davies	(substituted off) 52'
N8	8	Ross Moriarty
OF	7	Justin Tipuric	(substituted off) 61'
BF	6	Aaron Wainwright
RL	5	Alun Wyn Jones (c)
LL	4	Adam Beard	(substituted off) 67'
TP	3	Tomas Francis	(substituted off) 49'
HK	2	Ken Owens	(substituted off) 51'
LP	1	Nicky Smith	(substituted off) 49'
Replacements:
HK	16	Elliot Dee	(substituted on) 51'
PR	17	Wyn Jones	(substituted on) 49'
PR	18	Dillon Lewis	(substituted on) 49'
LK	19	Jake Ball	(substituted on) 67'
FL	20	Aaron Shingler	(substituted on) 61'
SH	21	Aled Davies	(substituted on) 52'
FH	22	Dan Biggar	(substituted on) 33'
WG	23	Owen Watkin	(substituted on) 67'
Coach:
(New Zealand) Warren Gatland

Man of the Match:
Billy Vunipola (England)

Assistant referees:
Pascal Gaüzère (France)
Alexandre Ruiz (France)
Television match official:
Brian MacNeice (Ireland)

Notes:

- Willi Heinz, Lewis Ludlam, Joe Marchant, and Jack Singleton (all England) made their international debuts.
- Alun Wyn Jones (Wales) became his country's most-capped player with 135 international appearances; 126 for Wales, 9 for the British and Irish Lions.
- Wales' defeat ended their record 14-match unbeaten streak.
- Sam Underhill, Henry Slade and Ruaridh McConnochie were named in England's starting lineup at open-side flanker, outside centre and right wing respectively, but were all ruled out due to injury. Tom Curry moved to open-side as Lewis Ludlam took Curry's place at blind-side, while Jonathan Joseph and Joe Cokanasiga replaced Slade and McConnochie. Courtney Lawes and Manu Tuilagi took Ludlam and Cokanasiga's places on the bench. Tomos Williams was also to start as the replacement scrum half for Wales but was also ruled out. He was replaced by Aled Davies.

=== 12 August ===
12 August 2019
19:00 MSK (UTC+03)

Russia	40–0	Russia Club XV
Try: Zhivatov 9' m Gaisin 25' c Gadzhiev 38' c Sychev (2) 42' c, 63' c Simplikevich 46' c Con: Gaisin (1/2) 25'; Kushnarev (3/3) 39', 43', 47'; Yanyushkin (1/1) 64'	Report (In Russian)

Slava Stadium, Moscow
Attendance: 1,500
Referee: Artur Kaptyukh (Russia)

=== 17 August ===
17 August 2019
19:35 NZST (UTC+12)

New Zealand	36–0	Australia
Try: Mo'unga 29' c Smith 32' c Williams 46' c Reece 67' c Bridge 78' m Con: Mo'unga (3/3) 31', 34', 46'; B. Barrett (1/2) 69'; Pen: Mo'unga (1/2) 4'	Report

Eden Park, Auckland
Attendance: 48,339
Referee: Jaco Peyper (South Africa)

Team details

FB	15	Beauden Barrett
RW	14	Sevu Reece
OC	13	Anton Lienert-Brown
IC	12	Sonny Bill Williams	(substituted off) 65'
LW	11	George Bridge
FH	10	Richie Mo'unga	(substituted off) 58'
SH	9	Aaron Smith	(substituted off) 52'
N8	8	Kieran Read (c)
OF	7	Sam Cane	(substituted off) 67'
BF	6	Ardie Savea
RL	5	Sam Whitelock
LL	4	Patrick Tuipulotu	(substituted off) 37'	(substituted on) 45'	(substituted off) 70'
TP	3	Nepo Laulala	(substituted off) 65'
HK	2	Dane Coles	(yellow card) 37'		(substituted off) 56'
LP	1	Joe Moody	(substituted off) 52'
Replacements:
HK	16	Codie Taylor	(substituted on) 37'	(substituted off) 45'	(substituted on) 56'
PR	17	Ofa Tu'ungafasi	(substituted on) 52'
PR	18	Angus Ta'avao	(substituted on) 65'
LK	19	Jackson Hemopo			(substituted on) 70'
FL	20	Matt Todd	(substituted on) 67'
SH	21	TJ Perenara	(substituted on) 52'
CE	22	Ngani Laumape	(substituted on) 65'
FB	23	Jordie Barrett	(substituted on) 58'
Coach:
(New Zealand) Steve Hansen

FB	15	Kurtley Beale
RW	14	Reece Hodge
OC	13	James O'Connor	(substituted off) 71'
IC	12	Samu Kerevi
LW	11	Marika Koroibete
FH	10	Christian Lealiifano	(substituted off) 46'
SH	9	Nic White	(substituted off) 51'
N8	8	Isi Naisarani
OF	7	Michael Hooper (c)
BF	6	Lukhan Salakaia-Loto	(substituted off) 61'
RL	5	Adam Coleman	(substituted off) 57'
LL	4	Izack Rodda
TP	3	Allan Alaalatoa	(substituted off) 45'
HK	2	Tolu Latu	(substituted off) 57'
LP	1	Scott Sio	(substituted off) 50'
Replacements:
HK	16	Folau Fainga'a	(substituted on) 57'
PR	17	James Slipper	(substituted on) 50'
PR	18	Taniela Tupou	(substituted on) 45'
LK	19	Rob Simmons	(substituted on) 57'
FL	20	Liam Wright	(substituted on) 61'
SH	21	Will Genia	(substituted on) 51'
FH	22	Matt To'omua	(substituted on) 46'
CE	23	Adam Ashley-Cooper	(substituted on) 71'
Coach:
(Australia) Michael Cheika

Man of the Match:
Anton Lienert-Brown (New Zealand)

Assistant referees:
Matthew Carley (England)
Shuhei Kubo (Japan)
Television match official:
Marius Jonker (South Africa)

Notes:

- Liam Wright (Australia) made his international debut.
- New Zealand retained the Bledisloe Cup.
- This was Steve Hansen's 100th test as head coach of New Zealand.

17 August 2019
14:15 BST (UTC+01)

Wales	13–6	England
Try: North 34' c Con: Biggar (1/1) 35'; Pen: Biggar (1/1) 26'; Halfpenny (1/2) 76'	Report	Pen: Ford (2/2) 51', 57'

Millennium Stadium, Cardiff
Attendance: 73,931
Referee: Pascal Gaüzère (France)

Team details

FB	15	Leigh Halfpenny
RW	14	George North
OC	13	Jonathan Davies
IC	12	Hadleigh Parkes	(substituted off) 75'
LW	11	Josh Adams
FH	10	Dan Biggar	(substituted off) 75'
SH	9	Gareth Davies	(substituted off) 61'
N8	8	Ross Moriarty
OF	7	James Davies	(substituted off) 24'
BF	6	Aaron Wainwright	(substituted off) 41'
RL	5	Alun Wyn Jones (c)
LL	4	Jake Ball	(substituted off) 66'
TP	3	Tomas Francis	(substituted off) 47'
HK	2	Ken Owens
LP	1	Nicky Smith	(substituted off) 47'
Replacements:
HK	16	Elliot Dee	(substituted on) 66'
PR	17	Wyn Jones	(substituted on) 47'
PR	18	Dillon Lewis	(substituted on) 47'
FL	19	Aaron Shingler	(substituted on) 41'
FL	20	Josh Navidi	(substituted on) 24'
SH	21	Aled Davies	(substituted on) 61'
FH	22	Jarrod Evans	(substituted on) 75'
CE	23	Owen Watkin	(substituted on) 75'
Coach:
(New Zealand) Warren Gatland

FB	15	Elliot Daly
RW	14	Anthony Watson	(yellow card) 33'
OC	13	Jonathan Joseph
IC	12	Piers Francis		(substituted off) 52'
LW	11	Joe Cokanasiga
FH	10	George Ford (c)		(substituted off) 61'
SH	9	Willi Heinz		(substituted off) 35'	(substituted on) 41'	(substituted off) 47'
N8	8	Billy Vunipola
OF	7	Lewis Ludlam		(substituted off) 76'
BF	6	Courtney Lawes
RL	5	Maro Itoje
LL	4	Joe Launchbury		(substituted off) 54'
TP	3	Dan Cole		(substituted off) 61'
HK	2	Luke Cowan-Dickie		(substituted off) 45'
LP	1	Ellis Genge		(substituted off) 45'
Replacements:
HK	16	Jamie George		(substituted on) 45'
PR	17	Joe Marler		(substituted on) 45'
PR	18	Kyle Sinckler		(substituted on) 61'
LK	19	George Kruis		(substituted on) 54'
HK	20	Jack Singleton		(substituted on) 76'
SH	21	Ben Youngs		(substituted on) 35'	(substituted off) 41'	(substituted on) 47'
FH	22	Owen Farrell		(substituted on) 52'
CE	23	Manu Tuilagi		(substituted on) 61'
Coach:
(Australia) Eddie Jones

Man of the Match:
Dan Biggar (Wales)

Assistant referees:
Mathieu Raynal (France)
Alexandre Ruiz (France)
Television match official:
Brian MacNeice (Ireland)

Notes:

- With this result, Wales became the fourth team to be placed number 1 in the World Rugby Rankings, ending New Zealand's 10-year run at the top dating back to 16 November 2009.
- England failed to score in a first half for the first time since their 2011 World Cup quarter-final versus France.
- Ruaridh McConnochie was named as England's right wing but was ruled out with injury for the second week running. He was replaced by Anthony Watson. Liam Williams was also ruled out at fullback for Wales and replaced by Leigh Halfpenny.
- Following George North's try, when Dan Biggar took a quick penalty before England's Ben Youngs had come on for Willi Heinz, World Rugby changed Law 3 so that play cannot restart until a player who has gone off due a blood or head injury has been temporarily replaced.

17 August 2019
17:05 SAST (UTC+02)

South Africa	24–18	Argentina
Try: Nkosi (2) 32' m, 48' c Con: Jantjies (1/2) 49'; Pen: Jantjies (4/4) 19', 60', 69', 78'	Report	Try: Petti 40' c Matera 65' m Con: Bonilla (1/1) 40'; Pen: Bonilla (1/2) 27'; Urdapilleta (1/1) 57'

Loftus Versfeld Stadium, Pretoria
Attendance: 29,826
Referee: Luke Pearce (England)

Team details

FB	15	Warrick Gelant
RW	14	S'busiso Nkosi
OC	13	Jesse Kriel
IC	12	André Esterhuizen	(substituted off) 55'
LW	11	Dillyn Leyds
FH	10	Elton Jantjies
SH	9	Cobus Reinach	(substituted off) 69'
N8	8	Marcell Coetzee	(substituted off) 16'
OF	7	Rynhardt Elstadt
BF	6	Siya Kolisi	(substituted off) 53'
RL	5	Lood de Jager	(substituted off) 68'
LL	4	RG Snyman
TP	3	Vincent Koch	(substituted off) 78'
HK	2	Schalk Brits (c)	(substituted off) 71'
LP	1	Thomas du Toit	(substituted off) 47'
Replacements:
HK	16	Siyabonga Ntubeni	(substituted on) 71'
PR	17	Lizo Gqoboka	(substituted on) 47'
PR	18	Wilco Louw	(substituted on) 78'
LK	19	Marvin Orie	(substituted on) 68'
FL	20	Kwagga Smith	(substituted on) 16'
FL	21	Marco van Staden	(substituted on) 53'
SH	22	Faf de Klerk	(substituted on) 69'
CE	23	François Steyn	(substituted on) 55'
Coach:
(South Africa) Rassie Erasmus

FB	15	Joaquín Tuculet
RW	14	Sebastián Cancelliere
OC	13	Jerónimo de la Fuente
IC	12	Lucas Mensa
LW	11	Ramiro Moyano	(substituted off) 70'
FH	10	Joaquín Díaz Bonilla	(substituted off) 55'
SH	9	Felipe Ezcurra	(substituted off) 55'
N8	8	Javier Ortega Desio	(substituted off) 47'
OF	7	Marcos Kremer	(substituted off) 55'
BF	6	Pablo Matera (c)
RL	5	Tomás Lavanini
LL	4	Guido Petti
TP	3	Santiago Medrano	(substituted off) 55'
HK	2	Julián Montoya	(substituted off) 55'
LP	1	Mayco Vivas	(substituted off) 55'
Replacements:
HK	16	Santiago Socino	(substituted on) 55'
PR	17	Nahuel Tetaz Chaparro	(substituted on) 55'
PR	18	Juan Figallo	(substituted on) 55'
LK	19	Matías Alemanno	(substituted on) 55'
FL	20	Tomás Lezana	(substituted on) 47'
SH	21	Gonzalo Bertranou	(substituted on) 55'
FH	22	Benjamín Urdapilleta	(substituted on) 55'
WG	23	Santiago Carreras	(substituted on) 70'
Coach:
(Argentina) Mario Ledesma

Assistant referees:
Andrew Brace (Ireland)
Pierre Brousset (France)
Television match official:
Simon McDowell (Ireland)

Notes:

- Siyabonga Ntubeni (South Africa) and Santiago Carreras and Lucas Mensa (both Argentina) made their international debuts.
- Jerónimo de la Fuente (Argentina) earned his 50th test cap.

17 August 2019
18:25 CEST (UTC+02)

Italy	85–15	Russia
Try: Morisi 7' c Parisse 15' c Bellini (2) 24' m, 27' c Minozzi (3) 37' c, 59' m, 73' c Hayward 40' m Allan 41' c Ferrari 47' c Padovani (2) 56' c, 66' c Canna 80' m Con: Allan (6/8) 8', 16', 28', 37', 42', 48'; Canna (4/5) 57', 67', 74', 80'	Report (In Italian)	Try: Golosnitsky 17' m Fedotko 78' c Con: Kushnarev (1/1) 79'; Pen: Gaisin (1/2) 3'

Stadio Riviera delle Palme, San Benedetto del Tronto
Attendance: 10,853
Referee: Karl Dickson (England)

Team details

FB	15	Jayden Hayward	(substituted off) 51'
RW	14	Mattia Bellini
OC	13	Michele Campagnaro
IC	12	Luca Morisi
LW	11	Matteo Minozzi
FH	10	Tommaso Allan	(substituted off) 51'
SH	9	Tito Tebaldi	(substituted off) 51'
N8	8	Sergio Parisse (c)	(substituted off) 51'
OF	7	Jake Polledri
BF	6	Braam Steyn
RL	5	Federico Ruzza
LL	4	Dave Sisi	(substituted off) 51'
TP	3	Tiziano Pasquali	(substituted off) 45'
HK	2	Luca Bigi	(substituted off) 45'
LP	1	Andrea Lovotti	(substituted off) 40'
Replacements:
HK	16	Federico Zani	(substituted on) 45'
PR	17	Simone Ferrari	(substituted on) 40'
PR	18	Marco Riccioni	(substituted on) 45'
LK	19	Alessandro Zanni	(substituted on) 51'
FL	20	Sebastian Negri	(substituted on) 51'
SH	21	Callum Braley	(substituted on) 51'
FH	22	Carlo Canna	(substituted on) 51'
FB	23	Edoardo Padovani	(substituted on) 51'
Coach:
(Ireland) Conor O'Shea

FB	15	Vasily Artemyev (c)
RW	14	Vladislav Sozonov
OC	13	Vladimir Ostroushko	(substituted off) 68'
IC	12	Dmitry Gerasimov
LW	11	Kirill Golosnitsky
FH	10	Ramil Gaisin	(substituted off) 40'
SH	9	Dmitry Perov	(substituted off) 63'
N8	8	Victor Gresev
OF	7	Tagir Gadzhiev	(substituted off) 66'
BF	6	Andrei Ostrikov
RL	5	Andrey Garbuzov	(substituted off) 49'
LL	4	Nikita Vavilin
TP	3	Kirill Gotovtsev	(substituted off) 45'
HK	2	Stanislav Sel'skiy	(substituted off) 49'
LP	1	Valery Morozov	(substituted off) 51'
Replacements:
HK	16	Evgeny Matveev	(substituted on) 49'
PR	17	Andrey Polivalov	(substituted on) 51'
PR	18	Vladimir Podrezov	(substituted on) 45'
LK	19	Bogdan Fedotko	(substituted on) 49'
FL	20	Vitaly Zhivatov	(substituted on) 66'
SH	21	Vasily Dorofeev	(substituted on) 63'
FH	22	Yuri Kushnarev	(substituted on) 40'
WG	23	Denis Simplikevich	(substituted on) 68'
Coach:
(Wales) Lyn Jones

Man of the Match:
Jake Polledri (Italy)

Assistant referees:
Ben Whitehouse (Wales)
Sean Gallagher (Ireland)

Notes:

- Russia played a Tier 1 nation outside a Rugby World Cup for the first time since their game against Italy in 2006. Russia most recently played a Tier 1 nation, Australia, during the 2011 Rugby World Cup.

17 August 2019
21:05 CEST (UTC+02)

France	32–3	Scotland
Try: Raka 2' c Médard (2) 22' m, 54' m Alldritt 33' m Dupont 61' c Con: Lopez (2/5) 3', 62'; Pen: Lopez (1/1) 15'	Report	Pen: Hastings (1/1) 26'

Allianz Riviera, Nice
Attendance: 35,624
Referee: Nigel Owens (Wales)

Team details

FB	15	Maxime Médard
RW	14	Damian Penaud	(substituted off) 64'
OC	13	Gaël Fickou
IC	12	Wesley Fofana	(substituted off) 66'
LW	11	Alivereti Raka
FH	10	Camille Lopez
SH	9	Antoine Dupont	(substituted off) 64'
N8	8	Grégory Alldritt	(substituted off) 35'	(substituted on) 40'	(substituted off) 61'
OF	7	Charles Ollivon
BF	6	François Cros
RL	5	Sébastien Vahaamahina
LL	4	Paul Gabrillagues	(substituted off) 71'
TP	3	Rabah Slimani	(substituted off) 55'
HK	2	Camille Chat	(substituted off) 55'
LP	1	Jefferson Poirot (c)	(substituted off) 55'
Replacements:
HK	16	Peato Mauvaka	(substituted on) 55'
PR	17	Dany Priso	(substituted on) 55'
PR	18	Emerick Setiano	(substituted on) 55'
LK	19	Félix Lambey	(substituted on) 71'
N8	20	Louis Picamoles	(substituted on) 35'	(substituted off) 40'	(substituted on) 61'
SH	21	Baptiste Serin	(substituted on) 64'
FH	22	Romain Ntamack	(substituted on) 66'
FB	23	Thomas Ramos	(substituted on) 64'
Coach:
(France) Jacques Brunel

FB	15	Stuart Hogg		(substituted off) 55'
RW	14	Darcy Graham
OC	13	Huw Jones
IC	12	Duncan Taylor		(substituted off) 47'
LW	11	Byron McGuigan
FH	10	Adam Hastings	(yellow card) 32'
SH	9	Ali Price		(substituted off) 55'
N8	8	Josh Strauss
OF	7	Jamie Ritchie
BF	6	John Barclay		(substituted off) 52'
RL	5	Grant Gilchrist
LL	4	Ben Toolis		(substituted off) 55'
TP	3	Simon Berghan		(substituted off) 52'
HK	2	Stuart McInally (c)		(substituted off) 66'
LP	1	Jamie Bhatti		(substituted off) 40'
Replacements:
HK	16	George Turner		(substituted on) 66'
PR	17	Gordon Reid		(substituted on) 52'
PR	18	Zander Fagerson		(substituted on) 40'
LK	19	Scott Cummings		(substituted on) 55'
FL	20	Matt Fagerson		(substituted on) 52'
SH	21	George Horne		(substituted on) 55'
CE	22	Rory Hutchinson		(substituted on) 47'
FB	23	Blair Kinghorn		(substituted on) 55'
Coach:
(Scotland) Gregor Townsend

Assistant referees:
Wayne Barnes (England)
Federico Anselmi (Argentina)
Television match official:
Graham Hughes (England)

Notes:

- François Cros, Peato Mauvaka, Alivereti Raka and Emerick Setiano (all France) and Scott Cummings and Rory Hutchinson (both Scotland) made their international debuts.

=== 24 August ===
24 August 2019
15:00 TOT (UTC+13)

Tonga	19–15	(Australia) Western Force
Try: Faiva 26' c Fukofuka 57' c Halaifonua 66' m Con: Faiva (1/1) 27'; Morath (1/2) 58'		Try: Lavaka 19' m McGregor 32' m Bardoul 80' m

Teufaiva Sport Stadium, Nukuʻalofa
Attendance: 1,000
Referee: Kaveni Talemaivalagi (Fiji)

24 August 2019
14:00 SAST (UTC+02)

Sharks Invitation XV (South Africa)	0–43	Namibia
		Try: Plato 8' m Conradie 21' m Walters (2) 34' c, 66' m Van Jaarsveld 44' c Kitshoff 53' m Forbes 70' c Con: Steenkamp (3/5) 22', 34', 45'; Stevens (1/2) 71'

Crusaders, Durban
Referee: Blake Beattie (South Africa)

24 August 2019
13:10 BST (UTC+01)

Scotland	17–14	France
Try: Maitland 39' c Harris 60' c Con: Laidlaw (2/2) 40', 61'; Pen: Laidlaw (1/1) 5'	Report	Try: Penaud (2) 2' c, 27' c Con: Ramos (2/2) 3', 29'

Murrayfield Stadium, Edinburgh
Attendance: 66,181
Referee: Wayne Barnes (England)

Team details

FB	15	Stuart Hogg
RW	14	Tommy Seymour	(substituted off) 17'
OC	13	Chris Harris
IC	12	Peter Horne	(substituted off) 69'
LW	11	Sean Maitland
FH	10	Finn Russell
SH	9	Greig Laidlaw (c)	(substituted off) 74'
N8	8	Blade Thomson	(substituted off) 43'
OF	7	Hamish Watson
BF	6	Ryan Wilson
RL	5	Sam Skinner	(substituted off) 64'
LL	4	Scott Cummings	(substituted off) 59'
TP	3	Willem Nel	(substituted off) 59'
HK	2	George Turner
LP	1	Gordon Reid	(substituted off) 48'
Replacements:
HK	16	Grant Stewart	(substituted on) 64'
PR	17	Allan Dell	(substituted on) 48'
PR	18	Simon Berghan	(substituted on) 59'
LK	19	Grant Gilchrist	(substituted on) 59'
FL	20	John Barclay	(substituted on) 43'
SH	21	George Horne	(substituted on) 74'
CE	22	Rory Hutchinson	(substituted on) 69'
FB	23	Blair Kinghorn	(substituted on) 17'
Coach:
(Scotland) Gregor Townsend

FB	15	Thomas Ramos	(substituted off) 65'
RW	14	Damian Penaud
OC	13	Sofiane Guitoune
IC	12	Gaël Fickou
LW	11	Alivereti Raka
FH	10	Camille Lopez	(substituted off) 39'
SH	9	Antoine Dupont	(substituted off) 64'
N8	8	Grégory Alldritt	(substituted off) 75'
OF	7	Charles Ollivon
BF	6	Arthur Iturria
RL	5	Sébastien Vahaamahina
LL	4	Félix Lambey	(substituted off) 51'
TP	3	Rabah Slimani	(substituted off) 64'
HK	2	Guilhem Guirado (c)	(substituted off) 52'
LP	1	Jefferson Poirot	(substituted off) 52'
Replacements:
HK	16	Camille Chat	(substituted on) 52'
PR	17	Cyril Baille	(substituted on) 52'
PR	18	Emerick Setiano	(substituted on) 64'
LK	19	Romain Taofifénua	(substituted on) 51'
FL	20	Yacouba Camara	(substituted on) 75'
SH	21	Baptiste Serin	(substituted on) 64'
FH	22	Romain Ntamack	(substituted on) 39'
FB	23	Maxime Médard	(substituted on) 65'
Coach:
(France) Jacques Brunel

Man of the Match:
Hamish Watson (Scotland)

Assistant referees:
Andrew Brace (Ireland)
Federico Anselmi (Argentina)
Television match official:
Graham Hughes (England)

Notes:

- Grant Stewart and Blade Thomson (both Scotland) made their international debuts.
- Wesley Fofana was to start at inside centre for France but was ruled out through injury. Gaël Fickou moved to the inside while Sofiane Guitoune came in to the outside.
- Nigel Owens was due to assistant referee in this match but was reassigned to referee the England v Ireland game in place of Jaco Peyper who withdrew from his officiating duties in that game due to a delayed flight. Andrew Brace replaced Owens on the touchline.

24 August 2019
15:00 BST (UTC+01)

England	57–15	Ireland
Try: Cokanasiga (2) 11' m, 65' c Daly 30' c Tuilagi 36' c Itoje 45' c Kruis 53' c Curry 57' c Cowan-Dickie 77' c Con: Farrell (6/7) 31', 37', 47', 55', 58', 66'; Ford (1/1) 79'; Pen: Farrell (1/1) 7'	Report	Try: Larmour 9' c Aki 73' m Con: Byrne (1/1) 10'; Pen: Byrne (1/1) 26'

Twickenham Stadium, London
Attendance: 80,000
Referee: Nigel Owens (Wales)

Team details

FB	15	Elliot Daly
RW	14	Joe Cokanasiga
OC	13	Manu Tuilagi		(substituted off) 72'
IC	12	Owen Farrell (c)		(substituted off) 68'
LW	11	Jonny May
FH	10	George Ford
SH	9	Ben Youngs		(substituted off) 55'
N8	8	Billy Vunipola
OF	7	Sam Underhill		(substituted off) 60'
BF	6	Tom Curry		(substituted off) 60'
RL	5	George Kruis	(yellow card) 80'
LL	4	Maro Itoje
TP	3	Kyle Sinckler		(substituted off) 61'
HK	2	Jamie George		(substituted off) 55'
LP	1	Joe Marler		(substituted off) 62'	(substituted on) 79'
Replacements:
HK	16	Luke Cowan-Dickie		(substituted on) 55'
PR	17	Mako Vunipola		(substituted on) 62'	(substituted off) 79'
PR	18	Dan Cole		(substituted on) 61'
LK	19	Courtney Lawes		(substituted on) 60'
FL	20	Mark Wilson		(substituted on) 60'
SH	21	Willi Heinz		(substituted on) 55'
CE	22	Piers Francis		(substituted on) 68'
CE	23	Joe Marchant		(substituted on) 72'
Coach:
(Australia) Eddie Jones

FB	15	Rob Kearney	(substituted off) 55'
RW	14	Jordan Larmour
OC	13	Garry Ringrose
IC	12	Bundee Aki
LW	11	Jacob Stockdale
FH	10	Ross Byrne	(substituted off) 56'
SH	9	Conor Murray	31' to 38'		(substituted off) 40'
N8	8	CJ Stander
OF	7	Josh van der Flier
BL	6	Peter O'Mahony
RL	5	Jean Kleyn	(substituted off) 56'
LL	4	Iain Henderson	(substituted off) 61'
TP	3	Tadhg Furlong	(substituted off) 56'
HK	2	Rory Best (c)	(substituted off) 56'
LP	1	Cian Healy	(substituted off) 40'
Replacements:
HK	16	Seán Cronin	(substituted on) 56'
PR	17	Jack McGrath	(substituted on) 40'
PR	18	Andrew Porter	(substituted on) 56'
LK	19	Devin Toner	(substituted on) 56'
FL	20	Tadhg Beirne	(substituted on) 61'
SH	21	Luke McGrath	(substituted on) 31'	(substituted off) 38'	(substituted on) 40'
FH	22	Jack Carty	(substituted on) 56'
WG	23	Andrew Conway	(substituted on) 55'
Coach:
(New Zealand) Joe Schmidt

Man of the Match:
Manu Tuilagi (England)

Assistant referees:
Jérôme Garcès (France)
Alexandre Ruiz (France)
Television match official:
Philippe Bonhoure (France)

Notes:

- England recorded their largest win over Ireland, surpassing the 40 point margin set in 1997. England's 57 points total was their highest score against Ireland, surpassing the 50 points scored in 2000.
- Jaco Peyper was the appointed match referee but missed the game due to a delayed flight. Nigel Owens replaced him.

24 August 2019
14:00 UYT (UTC-03)

Uruguay	24–20	Sudamérica XV
Try: Kessler 6' c Freitas 14' c Leivas (2) 66' m, 72' m Con: Berchesi (1/4) 7'	Report	Try: Rebolo 20' c Reeves (2) 39' m, 50' m Con: Reeves (1/3) 21'; Pen: Reeves (1/2) 70'

Estadio Charrúa, Montevideo
Referee: Damián Schneider (Argentina)

24 August 2019
15:00 EDT (UTC-04)

Canada	35–38	(Ireland) Leinster
Try: Olmstead 39' c Ardron 47' c Parfrey (2) 59' c, 70' c Baillie 66' c Con: Nelson (5/5) 40', 48', 60', 67', 71	Report	Try: Deegan (3) 5' m, 26' c, 73' c B. Byrne 16' c Murphy 64' m Keenan 80' c Con: Frawley (2/4) 17', 27'; H. Byrne (2/2) 74', 80'

Tim Hortons Field, Hamilton
Referee: Moe Chaudhry (Canada)

=== 27 August ===
27 August 2019
19:15 GET (UTC+04)

Georgia	24–20	(South Africa) Southern Kings
Try: Aptsiauri 15' m Melikidze 67' m Penalty try 73'; Sutiashvili 76' c Con: Malaghuradze (1/2) 78'	Report	Try: Sithole 6' c Ambadiang 21' c Con: Catrakilis (2/2) 10', 23'; Pen: Catrakilis (2/2) 2', 49'

Mikheil Meskhi Stadium, Tbilisi
Attendance: 8,000
Referee: Andrew Brace (Ireland)

27 August 2019
19:00 MSK (UTC+03)

Russia	22–35	Jersey Reds
Try: Yanyushkin 34' m Sozonov 40' c Matveev 61' m Ostrikov 70' m Con: Yanyushkin (1/2) 40'	Report	Try: Van Dam 14' c Jones 19' c Dyer 26' c Ma'afu 38' c Slowik 54' c Con: Dyer (5/5) 14', 19', 26', 38', 54'

Slava Stadium, Moscow
Attendance: 2,000
Referee: Alexei Lebedev (Russia)

=== 30 August ===
30 August 2019
21:10 CEST (UTC+02)

France	47–19	Italy
Try: Huget 3' m Penalty try 24'; Chat 31' c Dupont 44' c Iturria 46' c Taofifénua 59' c Ramos 75' c Con: Ntamack (5/6) 32', 45', 47', 60', 76'	Report (In Italian)	Try: Bellini (2) 20' c, 67' m Polledri 51' c Con: Allan (2/3) 20', 52'

Stade de France, Saint-Denis
Referee: Matthew Carley (England)

Team details

FB	15	Maxime Médard
RW	14	Yoann Huget		(substituted off) 26'
OC	13	Sofiane Guitoune		(substituted off) 57'
IC	12	Wesley Fofana		(substituted off) 69'
LW	11	Gaël Fickou
FH	10	Romain Ntamack
SH	9	Antoine Dupont		(substituted off) 57'
N8	8	Louis Picamoles	(yellow card) 18'
OF	7	Yacouba Camara
BF	6	Wenceslas Lauret		(substituted off) 62'
RL	5	Romain Taofifénua
LL	4	Arthur Iturria		(substituted off) 55'
TP	3	Rabah Slimani	(yellow card) 22'	(substituted off) 52'
HK	2	Camille Chat		(substituted off) 52'
LP	1	Jefferson Poirot (c)		(substituted off) 52'
Replacements:
HK	16	Guilhem Guirado		(substituted on) 52'
PR	17	Cyril Baille		(substituted on) 52'
PR	18	Emerick Setiano		(substituted on) 52'
LK	19	Félix Lambey		(substituted on) 55'
FL	20	François Cros		(substituted on) 62'
SH	21	Baptiste Serin		(substituted on) 57'
WG	22	Virimi Vakatawa		(substituted on) 57'
FB	23	Thomas Ramos		(substituted on) 69'
Coach:
(France) Jacques Brunel

FB	15	Jayden Hayward
RW	14	Mattia Bellini	(yellow card) 24'
OC	13	Michele Campagnaro
IC	12	Luca Morisi		(substituted off) 27'
LW	11	Matteo Minozzi
FH	10	Tommaso Allan		(substituted off) 61'
SH	9	Tito Tebaldi		(substituted off) 62'
N8	8	Sergio Parisse (c)
OF	7	Jake Polledri		36' to 40'
BL	6	Braam Steyn				(substituted off) 62'
RL	5	Federico Ruzza		(substituted off) 54'
LL	4	Alessandro Zanni
TP	3	Marco Riccioni		(substituted off) 36'
HK	2	Luca Bigi		(substituted off) 47'
LP	1	Simone Ferrari		(substituted off) 40'
Replacements:
HK	16	Federico Zani		(substituted on) 47'
PR	17	Andrea Lovotti		(substituted on) 40'
PR	18	Tiziano Pasquali		(substituted on) 36'
LK	19	Dean Budd		(substituted on) 54'
FL	20	Sebastian Negri		(substituted on) 36'	(substituted off) 40'	(substituted on) 62'
SH	21	Guglielmo Palazzani		(substituted on) 62'
CE	22	Carlo Canna		(substituted on) 61'
WG	23	Tommaso Benvenuti		(substituted on) 27'
Coach:
(Ireland) Conor O'Shea

Assistant referees:
Luke Pearce (England)
Federico Anselmi (Argentina)
Television match official:
Graham Hughes (England)

Notes:

- Tommaso Allan (Italy) earned his 50th test cap.

30 August 2019
19:10 UYT (UTC-03)

Uruguay XV	43–5	Brazil XV
Try: Kessler 3' c Diana 14' m Mieres 37' m Freitas 52' m Inciarte 70' c A. Ormaechea 80' c Con: Cat (2/4) 4', 40'; Favaro (2/3) 71', 80'	Report	Try: Lima 65' m

Estadio Charrúa, Montevideo
Referee: Pablo De Luca (Argentina)

30 August 2019
18:30 PDT (UTC-07)

Canada	45–13	(Canada) BC All-Stars
Try: Coe 7' c Quattrin 11' c Blanchet (2) 54' c, 66' c Mack 76' c Con: O'Leary (6/6) 8', 12, 55', 67', 70', 77'; Pen: O'Leary (1/1) 28'	Report	Try: Mason 34' c Con: A. McQueen (1/1) 35'; Pen: A. McQueen (2/2) 15', 24'

Westhills Stadium, Langford, BC
Referee: Chris Assmus (Canada)

=== 31 August ===
31 August 2019
14:00 NZST (UTC+12)

New Zealand Heartland XV	19–36	Samoa
Try: Wright 14' c Holani 37' c Paiaua 45' m Con: Lash (2/3) 15', 14'	Report	Try: Alaalatoa (2) 5' m, 53' c Tuala (3) 18' m, 26' m, 80' c Paulo 43' c Con: Pisi (3/3) 44', 54', 80'

Eden Park, Auckland
Referee: Paul Williams (New Zealand)

31 August 2019
16:30 NZST (UTC+12)

Fiji	29–19	Tonga
Try: Tuisova 8' c Goneva 23' m Kunatani 37' m Waqaniburotu 46' c S. Matavesi 55' m Con: Volavola (2/5) 9', 47'		Try: Piutau 2' c Ngauamo 19' m Sakalia 61' c Con: Faiva (2/3) 3', 62'

Eden Park, Auckland, New Zealand
Referee: Ben O'Keeffe (New Zealand)

Team details

FB	15	Alivereti Veitokani
RW	14	Josua Tuisova
OC	13	Semi Radradra
IC	12	Levani Botia
LW	11	Vereniki Goneva
FH	10	Ben Volavola
SH	9	Frank Lomani
N8	8	Peceli Yato	(yellow card) 71'
OF	7	Semi Kunatani
BF	6	Dominiko Waqaniburotu (c)
RL	5	Leone Nakarawa
LL	4	Tevita Cavubati
TP	3	Kalivati Tawake
HK	2	Sam Matavesi
LP	1	Campese Ma'afu
Replacements:
HK	16	Tuvere Veremalua
PR	17	Eroni Mawi
PR	18	Peni Ravai
LK	19	Tevita Ratuva
N8	20	Viliame Mata
SH	21	Nikola Matawalu
CE	22	Josh Matavesi
WG	23	Waisea Nayacalevu
Coach:
(New Zealand) John McKee

FB	15	David Halaifonua
RW	14	Atieli Pakalani
OC	13	Siale Piutau (c)
IC	12	Cooper Vuna
LW	11	Viliami Lolohea
FH	10	James Faiva
SH	9	Sonatane Takulua
N8	8	Maama Vaipulu	(yellow card) 71'
OF	7	Fotu Lokotui
BF	6	Steve Mafi
RL	5	Leva Fifita
LL	4	Sam Lousi
TP	3	Siua Halanukonuka
HK	2	Paul Ngauamo
LP	1	Siegfried Fisiʻihoi
Replacements:
HK	16	Sosefo Sakalia
PR	17	Vunipola Fifita
PR	18	Maʻafu Fia
FL	19	Zane Kapeli
FL	20	Sione Kalamafoni
SH	21	Leon Fukofuka
FH	22	Kurt Morath
CE	23	Mali Hingano
Coach:
(Australia) Toutai Kefu

Assistant referees:
Nick Briant (New Zealand)
Cam Stone (New Zealand)
Television match official:
Aaron Paterson (New Zealand)

31 August 2019
14:30 BST (UTC+01)

Wales	17–22	Ireland
Try: Lane 64' c Patchell 76' c Con: Patchell (2/2) 65', 77'; Pen: J. Evans (1/1) 16'	Report	Try: Stockdale (2) 18' c, 28' m Penalty try 58'; Con: Carty (1/2) 19'; Pen: Carty (1/2) 9'

Millennium Stadium, Cardiff
Referee: Romain Poite (France)

Team details

FB	15	Hallam Amos
RW	14	Owen Lane
OC	13	Scott Williams
IC	12	Owen Watkin
LW	11	Steff Evans		(substituted off) 47'
FH	10	Jarrod Evans		(substituted off) 40'
SH	9	Aled Davies		(substituted off) 47'
N8	8	Josh Navidi (c)
OF	7	James Davies			(substituted off) 52'	(substituted on) 63'
BF	6	Aaron Shingler		(substituted off) 63'
RL	5	Bradley Davies		(substituted off) 47'
LL	4	Adam Beard
TP	3	Samson Lee		(substituted off) 40'	(substituted on) 52'	(substituted off) 63'
HK	2	Ryan Elias		(substituted off) 63'
LP	1	Rhys Carré		(substituted off) 40'
Replacements:
HK	16	Elliot Dee		(substituted on) 63'
PR	17	Rob Evans		(substituted on) 40'
PR	18	Leon Brown	(yellow card) 52'	(substituted on) 40'
LK	19	Jake Ball		(substituted on) 47'
FL	20	Aaron Wainwright		(substituted on) 63'
SH	21	Tomos Williams		(substituted on) 47'
FH	22	Rhys Patchell		(substituted on) 40'
FB	23	Jonah Holmes		(substituted on) 47'
Coach:
(New Zealand) Warren Gatland

FB	15	Will Addison	(substituted off) 44'	(substituted on) 52'	(substituted off) 57'
RW	14	Andrew Conway
OC	13	Chris Farrell
IC	12	Bundee Aki
LW	11	Jacob Stockdale	(substituted off) 40'
FH	10	Jack Carty
SH	9	Kieran Marmion	(substituted off) 60'
N8	8	Jack Conan
OF	7	Peter O'Mahony (c)	(substituted off) 60'
BL	6	Tadhg Beirne
RL	5	James Ryan	(substituted off) 52'
LL	4	Iain Henderson
TP	3	John Ryan	(substituted off) 52'
HK	2	Niall Scannell	(substituted off) 52'
LP	1	Dave Kilcoyne	(substituted off) 46'
Replacements:
HK	16	Rory Best	(substituted on) 52'
PR	17	Andrew Porter	(substituted on) 46'
PR	18	Tadhg Furlong	(substituted on) 52'
LK	19	Devin Toner	(substituted on) 52'
FL	20	Jordi Murphy	(substituted on) 60'
SH	21	Luke McGrath	(substituted on) 60'
CE	22	Garry Ringrose	(substituted on) 44'	(substituted off) 52'	(substituted on) 57'
WG	23	Dave Kearney	(substituted on) 40'
Coach:
(New Zealand) Joe Schmidt

Man of the Match::
Jack Carty (Ireland)

Assistant referees:
Jérôme Garcès (France)
Karl Dickson (England)
Television match official:
Rowan Kitt (England)

Notes:

- This was Warren Gatland's last home game in charge of Wales.
- Rhys Carré and Owen Lane (both Wales) made their international debuts.
- This ended Wales' 11-match home unbeaten run.
- With this loss, Wales dropped from number one in the World Rugby Rankings, after only spending two weeks at the top.

31 August 2019
16:30 SAST (UTC+02)

Namibia	28–22	(South Africa) Southern Kings
Try: Van Jaarsveld 20' c Jantjies 68' c Plato (2) 72' c, 79' c Con: Steenkamp (1/1) 21'; Loubser (3/3) 69', 73', 80'		Try: Mnisi 16' m Jackson (2) 25' c, 31' c Con: B. Pretorius (2/3) 25', 33'; Pen: B. Pretorius (1/1) 2'

Hage Geingob Stadium, Windhoek
Referee: Egon Seconds (South Africa)

31 August 2019
20:00 GET (UTC+04)

Georgia	10–44	Scotland
Try: Asieshvili 59' c Con: Abzhandadze (1/1) 60'; Pen: Matiashvili (1/1) 35'	Report	Try: Toolis 14' c Hutchinson (2) 20' c, 47' c Graham 63' c Cummings 77' c Con: Laidlaw (3/3) 15', 21', 48'; Russell (1/1) 64'; Hastings (1/1) 78'; Pen: Laidlaw (3/3) 7', 13', 40' +2

Dinamo Arena, Tbilisi
Attendance: 45,000
Referee: Pascal Gaüzère (France)

Team details

FB	15	Soso Matiashvili	(substituted off) 55'
RW	14	Mirian Modebadze
OC	13	Zurab Dzneladze	(substituted off) 57'
IC	12	Davit Kacharava
LW	11	Alexander Todua
FH	10	Tedo Abzhandadze
SH	9	Vasil Lobzhanidze	(substituted off) 55'
N8	8	Beka Gorgadze
OF	7	Beka Saghinadze
BF	6	Otar Giorgadze
RL	5	Konstantin Mikautadze	(substituted off) 60'
LL	4	Shalva Sutiashvili	(substituted off) 67'
TP	3	Beka Gigashvili	(substituted off) 57'
HK	2	Shalva Mamukashvili	(substituted off) 57'
LP	1	Mikheil Nariashvili (c)	(substituted off) 57'
Replacements:
HK	16	Giorgi Chkoidze	(substituted on) 57'
PR	17	Karlen Asieshvili	(substituted on) 57'
PR	18	Levan Chilachava	(substituted on) 57'
LK	19	Giorgi Nemsadze	(substituted on) 60'
N8	20	Lasha Lomidze	(substituted on) 67'
SH	21	Gela Aprasidze	(substituted on) 55'
CE	22	Lasha Khmaladze	(substituted on) 55'
WG	23	Tamaz Mchedlidze	(substituted on) 57'
Coach:
(New Zealand) Milton Haig

FB	15	Blair Kinghorn
RW	14	Darcy Graham
OC	13	Rory Hutchinson
IC	12	Sam Johnson	(substituted off) 49'
LW	11	Sean Maitland
FH	10	Finn Russell	(substituted off) 66'
SH	9	Greig Laidlaw	(substituted off) 60'
N8	8	Matt Fagerson	(substituted off) 60'
OF	7	Hamish Watson
BF	6	John Barclay	(substituted off) 70'
RL	5	Grant Gilchrist
LL	4	Ben Toolis
TP	3	Willem Nel	(substituted off) 60'
HK	2	Stuart McInally (c)	(substituted off) 66'
LP	1	Allan Dell	(substituted off) 60'
Replacements:
HK	16	Grant Stewart	(substituted on) 66'
PR	17	Jamie Bhatti	(substituted on) 60'
PR	18	Zander Fagerson	(substituted on) 60'
LK	19	Scott Cummings	(substituted on) 70'
N8	20	Josh Strauss	(substituted on) 60'
SH	21	Ali Price	(substituted on) 60'
FH	22	Adam Hastings	(substituted on) 64'
CE	23	Huw Jones	(substituted on) 49'
Coach:
(Scotland) Gregor Townsend

Man of the Match:
Finn Russell (Scotland)

Assistant referees:
Ben Whitehouse (Wales)
Pierre Brousset (France)
Television match official:
Trevor Fisher (England)

Notes:

- Scotland became the first Tier One nation to play a Test match in Georgia.

=== 6 September ===
6 September 2019
19:15 JST (UTC+09)

Japan	7–41	South Africa
Try: Matsushima 60' c Con: Tamura (1/1) 61'	Report	Try: Kolbe (2) 8' c, 73' c Mapimpi (3) 22' c, 31' m, 53' m Jantjies 79' c Con: Pollard (2/4) 9', 24'; Steyn (2/2) 74', 80' +1; Pen: Pollard (1/1) 39'

Kumagaya Rugby Ground, Kumagaya
Attendance: 22,258
Referee: Nic Berry (Australia)

Team details

FB	15	Will Tupou
RW	14	Kotaro Matsushima
OC	13	Timothy Lafaele
IC	12	Ryoto Nakamura
LW	11	Kenki Fukuoka	(substituted off) 5'
FH	10	Yu Tamura
SH	9	Kaito Shigeno	(substituted off) 54'
N8	8	Amanaki Mafi	(substituted off) 46'
OF	7	Lappies Labuschagné
BF	6	Michael Leitch (c)
RL	5	Uwe Helu	(substituted off) 40'
LL	4	Luke Thompson
TP	3	Koo Ji-won	(substituted off) 40'
HK	2	Atsushi Sakate	(substituted off) 71'
LP	1	Keita Inagaki	(substituted off) 61'
Replacements:
HK	16	Takuya Kitade	(substituted on) 71'
PR	17	Isileli Nakajima	(substituted on) 61'
PR	18	Asaeli Ai Valu	(substituted on) 40'
LK	19	James Moore	(substituted on) 40'
FL	20	Yoshitaka Tokunaga	(substituted on) 46'
SH	21	Yutaka Nagare	(substituted on) 54'
FH	22	Rikiya Matsuda		(substituted on) 66'
WG	23	Ataata Moeakiola	(substituted on) 5'	(substituted off) 66'
Coach:
(New Zealand) Jamie Joseph

FB	15	Willie le Roux
RW	14	Cheslin Kolbe
OC	13	Lukhanyo Am		(substituted off) 64'
IC	12	Damian de Allende
LW	11	Makazole Mapimpi
FH	10	Handré Pollard		(substituted off) 60'
SH	9	Faf de Klerk		(substituted off) 66'
N8	8	Duane Vermeulen
OF	7	Pieter-Steph du Toit
BF	6	Siya Kolisi (c)		(substituted off) 66'
RL	5	Franco Mostert
LL	4	Eben Etzebeth		(substituted off) 70'
TP	3	Frans Malherbe		(substituted off) 51'	(substituted on) 64'
HK	2	Malcolm Marx		(substituted off) 54'
LP	1	Steven Kitshoff		(substituted off) 54'
Replacements:
HK	16	Bongi Mbonambi		(substituted on) 54'
PR	17	Tendai Mtawarira		(substituted on) 54'
PR	18	Trevor Nyakane		(substituted on) 51'	(substituted off) 64'
LK	19	RG Snyman		(substituted on) 70'
FL	20	Francois Louw	(yellow card) 71'	(substituted on) 66'
SH	21	Herschel Jantjies		(substituted on) 66'
CE	22	François Steyn		(substituted on) 60'
CE	23	Jesse Kriel		(substituted on) 64'
Coach:
(South Africa) Rassie Erasmus

Assistant referees:
Mike Fraser (New Zealand)
Graham Cooper (Australia)
Television match official:
Shane McDermott (New Zealand)

Notes:

- Takuya Kitade (Japan) made his international debut.
- Pieter-Steph du Toit (South Africa) earned his 50th test cap.
- This was the first time that Japan has hosted South Africa.

6 September 2019
19:30 BST (UTC+01)

Scotland	36–9	Georgia
Try: Price 17' m Kinghorn 23' m Johnson 50' c D. Graham 69' m G. Horne 71' c P. Horne 77' c Con: Hastings (2/5) 51', 78'; G. Horne (1/1) 72'	Report	Pen: Abzhandadze (3/4) 20', 27', 30'

Murrayfield Stadium, Edinburgh
Attendance: 53,000
Referee: Romain Poite (France)

Team details

FB	15	Blair Kinghorn		(substituted off) 26'
RW	14	Tommy Seymour
OC	13	Duncan Taylor
IC	12	Sam Johnson		(substituted off) 64'
LW	11	Darcy Graham
FH	10	Adam Hastings
SH	9	Ali Price		(substituted off) 51'
N8	8	Blade Thomson		(substituted off) 32'	(substituted on) 42'
OF	7	Jamie Ritchie		(substituted off) 45'
BF	6	Ryan Wilson (c)
RL	5	Jonny Gray		(substituted off) 40'
LL	4	Scott Cummings
TP	3	Zander Fagerson	(yellow card) 32'			(substituted off) 58'
HK	2	George Turner
LP	1	Gordon Reid		(substituted off) 54'
Replacements:
HK	16	Grant Stewart			(substituted on) 65'
PR	17	Allan Dell		(substituted on) 54'
PR	18	Simon Berghan		(substituted on) 32'	(substituted off) 42'	(substituted on) 58'
LK	19	Ben Toolis		(substituted on) 40'	(substituted off) 65'
FL	20	Magnus Bradbury		(substituted on) 45'
SH	21	George Horne		(substituted on) 51'
CE	22	Peter Horne		(substituted on) 64'
CE	23	Chris Harris		(substituted on) 26'
Coach:
(Scotland) Gregor Townsend

FB	15	Soso Matiashvili
RW	14	Zurab Dzneladze	(yellow card) 49'
OC	13	Davit Kacharava		(substituted off) 52'
IC	12	Lasha Malaghuradze		(substituted off) 65'
LW	11	Mirian Modebadze
FH	10	Tedo Abzhandadze
SH	9	Vasil Lobzhanidze		(substituted off) 60'
N8	8	Beka Gorgadze
OF	7	Giorgi Tkhilaishvili
BF	6	Shalva Sutiashvili		(substituted off) 32'	(substituted on) 42'	(substituted off) 64'
RL	5	Giorgi Nemsadze
LL	4	Konstantin Mikautadze		(substituted off) 72'
TP	3	Beka Gigashvili		(substituted off) 64'	(substituted on) 72'
HK	2	Shalva Mamukashvili		(substituted off) 72'
LP	1	Mikheil Nariashvili (c)	(yellow card) 32'			(substituted off) 64'
Replacements:
HK	16	Vano Karkadze		(substituted on) 72'
PR	17	Guram Gogichashvili		(substituted on) 32'	(substituted off) 42'	(substituted on) 64'
PR	18	Giorgi Melikidze		(substituted on) 64'	(substituted on) 72'
LK	19	Lasha Lomidze		(substituted on) 72'
FL	20	Beka Saghinadze				(substituted on) 64'
SH	21	Gela Aprasidze		(substituted on) 60'
CE	22	Giorgi Kveseladze		(substituted on) 52'
CE	23	Tamaz Mchedlidze		(substituted on) 65'
Coach:
(New Zealand) Milton Haig

Man of the Match::
Darcy Graham (Scotland)

Assistant referees:
Andrew Brace (Ireland)
Karl Dickson (England)
Television match official:
Rowan Kitt (England)

6 September 2019
19:45 BST (UTC+01)

England	37–0	Italy
Try: Youngs 44' c Marchant 52' c Genge 67' c Watson 73' c Con: Farrell (4/4) 44', 53', 69', 75'; Pen: Farrell (3/4) 4', 19', 40'	Report

St James' Park, Newcastle upon Tyne
Attendance: 50,157
Referee: Ben O'Keeffe (New Zealand)

Team details

FB	15	Anthony Watson
RW	14	Ruaridh McConnochie	(substituted off) 51'
OC	13	Joe Marchant
IC	12	Piers Francis	(substituted off) 46'
LW	11	Jonny May
FH	10	Owen Farrell (c)
SH	9	Ben Youngs	(substituted off) 60'
N8	8	Billy Vunipola	(substituted off) 57'
OF	7	Mark Wilson
BF	6	Tom Curry
RL	5	Courtney Lawes
LL	4	Joe Launchbury	(substituted off) 32'
TP	3	Dan Cole	(substituted off) 32'
HK	2	Jamie George	(substituted off) 56'	(substituted on) 72'
LP	1	Joe Marler	(substituted off) 32'	(substituted on) 75'
Replacements:
HK	16	Luke Cowan-Dickie	(substituted on) 56'	(substituted off) 72'
PR	17	Ellis Genge	(substituted on) 32'
PR	18	Kyle Sinckler	(substituted on) 32'	(substituted off) 75'
LK	19	Charlie Ewels	(substituted on) 32'
FL	20	Matt Kvesic	(substituted on) 57'
SH	21	Willi Heinz	(substituted on) 60'
FH	22	George Ford	(substituted on) 46'
WG	23	Joe Cokanasiga	(substituted on) 51'
Coach:
(Australia) Eddie Jones

FB	15	Jayden Hayward
RW	14	Mattia Bellini
OC	13	Giulio Bisegni
IC	12	Tommaso Benvenuti
LW	11	Edoardo Padovani
FH	10	Carlo Canna	(substituted off) 72'
SH	9	Callum Braley	(substituted off) 53'	(substituted on) 63'	(substituted off) 72'
N8	8	Jimmy Tuivaiti	(substituted off) 40'
OF	7	Braam Steyn
BL	6	Sebastian Negri	(substituted off) 47'
RL	5	Dean Budd (c)
LL	4	David Sisi	(substituted off) 69'
TP	3	Simone Ferrari	(substituted off) 46'
HK	2	Oliviero Fabiani	(substituted off) 53'
LP	1	Nicola Quaglio	(substituted off) 46'
Replacements:
HK	16	Federico Zani	(substituted on) 53'
PR	17	Andrea Lovotti	(substituted on) 46'
PR	18	Marco Riccioni	(substituted on) 46'
LK	19	Federico Ruzza	(substituted on) 47'
LK	20	Alessandro Zanni	(substituted on) 69'
FL	21	Maxime Mbanda	(substituted on) 40'
SH	22	Guglielmo Palazzani	(substituted on) 53'	(substituted off) 63'	(substituted on) 72'
FH	23	Tommaso Allan	(substituted on) 72'
Coach:
(Ireland) Conor O'Shea

Man of the Match:
Ben Youngs (England)

Assistant referees:
Jérôme Garcès (France)
Frank Murphy (Ireland)
Television match official:
Brian MacNeice (Ireland)

Notes:

- Ruaridh McConnochie (England) made his international debut.
- This was the first time England had played in Newcastle upon Tyne and the first home match played away from Twickenham since playing Uruguay at City of Manchester Stadium during the 2015 Rugby World Cup, and the first non-Rugby World Cup game since playing Argentina at Old Trafford in 2009.

=== 7 September ===
7 September 2019
14:35 NZST (UTC+12)

New Zealand	92–7	Tonga
Try: Reece 8' c B. Smith (2) 15', 37' c Taylor 19' c Bridge (4) 26' m, 40' m, 52' c, 56' c Read 32' c Perenara 35' c Crotty (2) 39' c, 64' c Todd 45' m Savea 46' c Con: B. Barrett (7/8) 9', 17', 21, 33', 36', 38', 40'; Ioane (4/6) 47', 53', 57', 65'	Report	Try: Piutau 77' c Con: Takulua (1/1) 78'

Waikato Stadium, Hamilton
Attendance: 22,349
Referee: Angus Gardner (Australia)

Team details

FB	15	Ben Smith	(substituted off) 53'
RW	14	Sevu Reece
OC	13	Anton Lienert-Brown
IC	12	Ryan Crotty	(substituted off) 66'
LW	11	George Bridge
FH	10	Beauden Barrett	(substituted off) 40'
SH	9	TJ Perenara	(substituted off) 58'
N8	8	Kieran Read (c)
OF	7	Matt Todd	(substituted off) 53'
BF	6	Ardie Savea
RL	5	Sam Whitelock	(substituted off) 49'
LL	4	Patrick Tuipulotu
TP	3	Nepo Laulala	(substituted off) 53'
HK	2	Codie Taylor	(substituted off) 53'
LP	1	Joe Moody	(substituted off) 53'
Replacements:
HK	16	Liam Coltman	(substituted on) 52'
PR	17	Ofa Tu'ungafasi	(substituted on) 52'
PR	18	Angus Ta'avao	(substituted on) 52'
LK	19	Scott Barrett	(substituted on) 49'
FL	20	Luke Jacobson	(substituted on) 52'
SH	21	Aaron Smith	(substituted on) 58'
FH	22	Josh Ioane	(substituted on) 40'
FB	23	Jordie Barrett	(substituted on) 52'
Coach:
(New Zealand) Steve Hansen

FB	15	David Halaifonua		(substituted off) 40'
RW	14	Cooper Vuna
OC	13	Mali Hingano		(substituted off) 62'
IC	12	Siale Piutau (c)
LW	11	Viliami Lolohea		(substituted off) 53'
FH	10	Kurt Morath
SH	9	Sonatane Takulua
N8	8	Maama Vaipulu
OF	7	Foto Lokotui		(substituted off) 46'
BF	6	Sione Kalamafoni
RL	5	Leva Fifita		(substituted off) 63'
LL	4	Sam Lousi	(yellow card) 60'
TP	3	Siua Halanukonuka		(substituted off) 40'
HK	2	Siua Maile		(substituted off) 62'
LP	1	Siegfried Fisiʻihoi		(substituted off) 58'
Replacements:
HK	16	Sione Angaʻaelangi		(substituted on) 62'
PR	17	Vunipola Fifita		(substituted on) 58'
PR	18	Maʻafu Fia		(substituted on) 40'
LK	19	Daniel Faleafa		(substituted on) 63'
FL	20	Zane Kapeli		(substituted on) 46'
SH	21	Leon Fukofuka		(substituted on) 62'
FH	22	James Faiva		(substituted on) 53'
WG	23	Atieli Pakalani		(substituted on) 40'
Coach:
(Australia) Toutai Kefu

Assistant referees:
Damon Murphy (Australia)
Jordan Way (Australia)
Television match official:
James Leckie (Australia)

Notes:

- This was Steve Hansen's last home game in charge of New Zealand.
- Josh Ioane (New Zealand) and Vunipola Fifita and Siua Maile (both Tonga) made their international debuts.
- No replacement was brought on for Ryan Crotty.

7 September 2019
15:00 AEST (UTC+10)

Randwick (Australia)	0–74	Argentina
	Report	Try: Cubelli 18' c Montoya 23' c Leguizamón 32' c Kremer 38' c Carreras 40' m Chaparro 43' c Delguy (4) 61' m, 63' m, 66' m, 70' c Creevy 74' c Herrera 77' m Con: Urdapilleta (4/5) 19', 23', 33', 39'; Sánchez (3/7) 44', 71', 75'

Coogee Oval, Coogee
Referee: James Quinn (Australia)

7 September 2019
19:30 AEST (UTC+10)

Australia	34–15	Samoa
Try: Coleman 7' m Koroibete 15' m Ashley-Cooper 30' m Salakaia-Loto 35' c Haylett-Petty 70' c To'omua 80' m Con: Foley (2/6) 36', 71'	Report	Try: Polataivao (2) 52' m, 61' c Con: Pisi (1/2) 62'; Pen: Pisi (1/2) 28'

Western Sydney Stadium, Parramatta
Attendance: 16,091
Referee: Paul Williams (New Zealand)

Team details

FB	15	Tom Banks
RW	14	Dane Haylett-Petty
OC	13	Adam Ashley-Cooper
IC	12	Matt To'omua
LW	11	Marika Koroibete	(substituted off) 72'
FH	10	Bernard Foley
SH	9	Will Genia	(substituted off) 68'
N8	8	Jack Dempsey	(substituted off) 72'
OF	7	David Pocock (c)	(substituted off) 58'
BF	6	Lukhan Salakaia-Loto
RL	5	Adam Coleman	(substituted off) 55'
LL	4	Rob Simmons
TP	3	Sekope Kepu	(substituted off) 49'
HK	2	Jordan Uelese	(substituted off) 64'
LP	1	James Slipper	(substituted off) 54'
Replacements:
HK	16	Tatafu Polota-Nau	(substituted on) 64'
PR	17	Scott Sio	(substituted on) 54'
PR	18	Taniela Tupou	(substituted on) 49'
LK	19	Luke Jones	(substituted on) 55'
FL	20	Liam Wright	(substituted on) 58'
N8	21	Rob Valetini	(substituted on) 72'
SH	22	Nick Phipps	(substituted on) 68'
CE	23	James O'Connor	(substituted on) 72'
Coach:
(Australia) Michael Cheika

FB	15	Tim Nanai-Williams
RW	14	Belgium Tuatagaloa	(substituted off) 57'
OC	13	Alapati Leiua
IC	12	Rey Lee-Lo
LW	11	Ed Fidow
FH	10	Tusi Pisi	(substituted off) 75'
SH	9	Scott Malolua	(substituted off) 40'
N8	8	Afaesetiti Amosa	(substituted off) 72'
OF	7	Jack Lam (c)	9' to 17'		(substituted off) 37'
BF	6	TJ Ioane
RL	5	Kane Le'aupepe
LL	4	Filo Paulo
TP	3	Michael Alaalatoa	(substituted off) 49'
HK	2	Ray Niuia	(substituted off) 44'
LP	1	Jordan Lay	(substituted off) 44'
Replacements:
HK	16	Motu Matu'u	(substituted on) 44'
PR	17	Paul Alo-Emile	(substituted on) 49'
PR	18	Logovi'i Mulipola	(substituted on) 44'
LK	19	Josh Tyrell	(substituted on) 9'	(substituted off) 17'	(substituted on) 37'
FL	20	Seilala Lam	(substituted on) 72'
SH	21	Dwayne Polataivao	(substituted on) 40'
FH	22	AJ Alatimu	(substituted on) 75'
FB	23	Ahsee Tuala	(substituted on) 57'
Coach:
(New Zealand) Steve Jackson

Assistant referees:
Brendon Pickerill (New Zealand)
Cam Stone (New Zealand)
Television match official:
Ben Skeen (New Zealand)

Notes:

- Rob Valetini (Australia), Michael Alaalatoa and Scott Malolua (both Samoa) made their international debuts.

7 September 2019
14:00 IST (UTC+01)

Ireland	19–10	Wales
Try: Kearney 21' c Furlong 50' c Ryan 58' m Con: Sexton (2/3) 22', 52'	Report	Try: Parkes 30' c Con: Halfpenny (1/1) 31'; Pen: Halfpenny (1/2) 25'

Aviva Stadium, Dublin
Referee: Mathieu Raynal (France)

Team details

FB	15	Rob Kearney
RW	14	Jordan Larmour
OC	13	Robbie Henshaw
IC	12	Bundee Aki
LW	11	Keith Earls	(substituted off) 52'
FH	10	Johnny Sexton	(substituted off) 63'
SH	9	Conor Murray	(substituted off) 71'
N8	8	Jack Conan
OF	7	Josh van der Flier	(substituted off) 59'
BF	6	CJ Stander
RL	5	Jean Kleyn	(substituted off) 52'
LL	4	James Ryan
TP	3	Tadhg Furlong	(substituted off) 56'
HK	2	Rory Best (c)	(substituted off) 52'
LP	1	Cian Healy	(substituted off) 41'
Replacements:
HK	16	Seán Cronin	(substituted on) 52'
PR	17	Dave Kilcoyne	(substituted on) 41'
PR	18	Andrew Porter	(substituted on) 56'
LK	19	Iain Henderson	(substituted on) 52'
FL	20	Rhys Ruddock	(substituted on) 59'
SH	21	Luke McGrath	(substituted on) 71'
FH	22	Jack Carty	(substituted on) 63'
CE	23	Garry Ringrose	(substituted on) 52'
Coach:
(New Zealand) Joe Schmidt

FB	15	Leigh Halfpenny		(substituted off) 65'
RW	14	George North
OC	13	Jonathan Davies
IC	12	Hadleigh Parkes
LW	11	Josh Adams
FH	10	Rhys Patchell		(substituted off) 23'
SH	9	Tomos Williams		(substituted off) 69'
N8	8	Ross Moriarty		(substituted off) 59'
OF	7	Justin Tipuric
BF	6	Aaron Wainwright
RL	5	Alun Wyn Jones (c)
LL	4	Jake Ball		(substituted off) 73'
TP	3	Tomas Francis		(substituted off) 59'
HK	2	Elliot Dee		(substituted off) 59'
LP	1	Wyn Jones		(substituted off) 59'
Replacements:
HK	16	Ken Owens		(substituted on) 59'
PR	17	Nicky Smith		(substituted on) 59'
PR	18	Dillon Lewis		(substituted on) 59'
LK	19	Adam Beard	(yellow card) 77'	(substituted on) 73'
FL	20	Josh Navidi		(substituted on) 59'
SH	21	Gareth Davies		(substituted on) 69'
FH	22	Dan Biggar		(substituted on) 23'
WG	23	Liam Williams		(substituted on) 65'
Coach:
(New Zealand) Warren Gatland

Assistant referees:
Wayne Barnes (England)
Luke Pearce (England)
Television match official:
Graham Hughes (England)

Notes:

- This was the last home game for Rory Best, playing for Ireland.
- This was Joe Schmidt's last home game in charge of Ireland.
- With this win, Ireland became the fifth team to be placed number 1 on the World Rugby Rankings, replacing New Zealand who had briefly retaken top spot from Wales after Ireland's earlier win against Wales the previous week.

7 September 2019
15:00 SAST (UTC+02)

Namibia	21–17	(South Africa) Southern Kings
Try: Greyling 32' m Van der Westhuizen 56' c Con: Loubser (1/2) 57'; Pen: Loubser (3/3) 18', 40', 45'		Try: Van Rooyen 37' c De Wee 72' c Con: Catrakilis (1/1) 38'; B. Pretorius (1/1) 72'; Pen: Catrakilis (1/1) 22'

Walvis Bay High School Stadium, Walvis Bay
Referee: Quinton Immelman (South Africa)

7 September 2019
19:00 MSK (UTC+03)

Russia	14–42	(Ireland) Connacht
Try: Artemyev 31' c Davydov 54' c Con: Kushnarev (2/2) 32', 55'		Try: Daly 4' c Leader 16' c Murphy 43' c Fitzgerald (2) 69' c, 72' c Boyle 78' c Con: Leader (6/6) 5', 17', 44', 70', 73', 79'

VTB Arena, Moscow
Attendance: 6,500
Referee: George Clancy (Ireland)

7 September 2019
15:00 UYT (UTC-03)

Uruguay	24–35	Argentina XV
Try: Kessler 8' c Freitas 25' c Magno 66' c Con: Ormaechea (2/2) 9', 26'; Favaro (1/1) 67'; Pen: Ormaechea (1/1) 10'	Report	Try: Montagner 4' c Chocobares 20' c Grondona 23' c Cancelliere 43' c Mendy 80' c Con: Albornoz (4/4) 5', 21', 24', 44'; Elías (1/1) 80'

Estadio Charrúa, Montevideo
Referee: Felipe Balbontín (Chile)

7 September 2019
19:00 PDT (UTC-07)

Canada	15–20	United States
Try: McRorie 2' c Nelson 16' m Con: Nelson (1/1) 3'; Pen: Nelson (1/1) 42'		Try: Dolan 37' c Fawsitt 49' m Iosefo 70' m Con: Magie (1/2) 38'; Pen: Magie (1/1) 20'

BC Place, Vancouver
Referee: Alexandre Ruiz (France)

Team details

FB	15	Pat Parfrey
RW	14	Jeff Hassler
OC	13	Ben LeSage
IC	12	Ciaran Hearn	(substituted off) 67'
LW	11	D. T. H. van der Merwe
FH	10	Peter Nelson	(substituted off) 62'
SH	9	Gordon McRorie	(substituted off) 72'
N8	8	Tyler Ardron (c)
OF	7	Lucas Rumball
BF	6	Justin Blanchet	(substituted off) 11'
RL	5	Kyle Baillie	(substituted off) 33'
LL	4	Evan Olmstead
TP	3	Matt Tierney	(substituted off) 55'
HK	2	Eric Howard	(substituted off) 64'
LP	1	Hubert Buydens	(substituted off) 18'	(substituted on) 18'	(substituted off) 55'
Replacements:
HK	16	Andrew Quattrin	(substituted on) 64'
PR	17	Djustice Sears-Duru	(substituted on) 18'	(substituted off) 18'	(substituted on) 55'
PR	18	Jake Ilnicki	(substituted on) 55'
LK	19	Mike Sheppard	(substituted on) 11'
FL	20	Matt Heaton	(substituted on) 33'
SH	21	Jamie Mackenzie	(substituted on) 72'
FH	22	Shane O'Leary	(substituted on) 62'
CE	23	Nick Blevins	(substituted on) 67'
Coach:
(Wales) Kingsley Jones

FB	15	Will Hooley
RW	14	Blaine Scully (c)
OC	13	Marcel Brache
IC	12	Paul Lasike
LW	11	Martin Iosefo	(substituted off) 75'
FH	10	Will Magie	(substituted off) 51'
SH	9	Nate Augspurger	(substituted off) 62'
N8	8	Cam Dolan
OF	7	Hanco Germishuys	(substituted off) 75'
BF	6	John Quill
RL	5	Greg Peterson		(substituted off) 72'
LL	4	Ben Landry	(substituted off) 63'	(substituted on) 72'
TP	3	Titi Lamositele	(substituted off) 49'
HK	2	Joe Taufete'e	(substituted off) 49'
LP	1	Eric Fry	(substituted off) 65'	(substituted on) 76'
Replacements:
HK	16	Dylan Fawsitt	(substituted off) 49'
PR	17	Olive Kilifi	(substituted on) 65'	(substituted off) 76'
PR	18	Paul Mullen	(substituted on) 49'
LK	19	Nate Brakeley	(substituted on) 63'
FL	20	Malon Al-Jiboori	(substituted on) 75'
SH	21	Shaun Davies	(substituted on) 62'
CE	22	Bryce Campbell	(substituted on) 75'
FB	23	Mike Te'o	(substituted on) 51'
Coach:
(South Africa) Gary Gold

Touch judges:
Mike Adamson (Scotland)
Sean Gallagher (Ireland)
Television match official:
Olly Hodges (Ireland)

Notes:

- Blaine Scully (United States) earned his 50th test cap.

== See also ==
- 2019 World Rugby Pacific Nations Cup
- 2019 Rugby Championship
- 2019 June rugby union tests
