= 2018 World Rugby Pacific Nations Cup =

Rugby Tournament 2018

Tournament details
- Countries: Fiji; Georgia; Samoa; Tonga
- Date: 9–16 June 2018

Tournament statistics
- Teams: 4
- Matches played: 4
- Attendance: 2,175 (544 per match)
- Tries scored: 23 (5.75 per match)
- Top point scorer(s): (Georgia (country)) Soso Matiashvili (21)
- Top try scorer(s): (Fiji) Henry Seniloli (3)

Final
- Champions: Fiji (5th title)
- Runners-up: Tonga

The 2018 World Rugby Pacific Nations Cup was the thirteenth edition of the Pacific Nations Cup annual international rugby union competition. All matches for the 2018 tournament, played over two rounds, were held in Fiji at the ANZ National Stadium in Suva.

Hosts Fiji and fellow Pacific nations Samoa and Tonga were joined by Georgia who competing for the first time in the tournament. Romania was also initially scheduled to compete for the Cup until Samoa's place in the competition was confirmed in May 2018.

Fiji won the tournament with two wins from their two matches played. Tonga and Georgia placed second and third respectively with one win each.

== Standings ==
Pos	Team	Pld	W	D	L	PF	PA	PD	TF	TA	TB	LB	Pts
1	Fiji	2	2	0	0	61	37	+24	10	5	2	0	10
2	Tonga	2	1	0	1	43	34	+9	5	3	0	1	5
3	Georgia	2	1	0	1	31	52	−21	3	8	0	0	4
4	Samoa	2	0	0	2	40	52	−12	5	7	0	1	1

Rules for classification: 4 points for a win, 2 points for a draw, 1 bonus point for a loss by seven points or less, 1 bonus point for scoring four or more tries in a match

== Fixtures ==
The match schedule:

=== Round 1 ===
9 June 2018
13:00 FJT (UTC+12)

(1 BP) Tonga	15–16	Georgia
Try: V. Lolohea 71' m Halaifonua 79' c Con: Morath (1/1) 79'; Pen: Takulua (1/2) 38'	Report	Try: Matiashvili 7' c Con: Matiashvili (1/1) 8'; Pen: Matiashvili (3/5) 21', 35', 60'

ANZ National Stadium, Suva
Attendance: 675
Referee: Brendon Pickerill (New Zealand)

FB	15	Sione Fifita
RW	14	David Halaifonua
OC	13	Nafi Tuitavake	(substituted off) 17'
IC	12	Siale Piutau (c)
LW	11	Penikolo Latu	(substituted off) 70'
FH	10	Kurt Morath
SH	9	Sonatane Takulua	(substituted off) 75'
N8	8	Nasi Manu
OF	7	Fotu Lokotui
BF	6	Daniel Faleafa	(substituted off) 56'
RL	5	Joe Tuineau
LL	4	Leva Fifita	(substituted off) 75'
TP	3	David Lolohea	(substituted off) 62'
HK	2	Paul Ngauamo	(substituted off) 70'
LP	1	Siegfried Fisiihoi	(substituted off) 70'
Replacements:
HK	16	Sosefo Sakalia	(substituted in) 70'
PR	17	David Feao	(substituted in) 70'
PR	18	Ben Tameifuna	(substituted in) 62'
N8	25	Valentino Mapapalangi	(substituted in) 56'
FL	26	Michael Faleafa	(substituted in) 75'
SH	21	Shinnosuke Tu'umoto'oa	(substituted in) 75'
CE	22	Latiume Fosita	(substituted in) 17'
WG	23	Viliami Lolohea	(substituted in) 70'
Coach:
(Australia) Toutai Kefu

FB	15	Soso Matiashvili
RW	14	Anzor Sitchinava
OC	13	Davit Kacharava
IC	12	Giorgi Kveseladze		(substituted off) 3'
LW	11	Alexander Todua		(substituted off) 65'
FH	10	Lasha Khmaladze
SH	9	Vasil Lobzhanidze		(substituted off) 75'
N8	8	Mikheil Gachechiladze	(yellow card) 46' to 56'
OF	7	Otar Giorgadze
BF	6	Shalva Sutiashvili		(substituted off) 65'
RL	5	Nodar Tcheishvili		(substituted off) 53'
LL	4	Giorgi Nemsadze (c)
TP	3	Levan Chilachava		(substituted off) 54'
HK	2	Shalva Mamukashvili		(substituted off) 54'
LP	1	Karlen Asieshvili		(substituted off) 67'
Replacements:
HK	16	Jaba Bregvadze		(substituted in) 54'	(yellow card) 78' to 80'
PR	17	Giorgi Tetrashvili		(substituted in) 67'
PR	18	Irakli Mirtskhulava		(substituted in) 54'
LK	19	Konstantin Mikautadze		(substituted in) 53'
FL	20	Saba Shubitidze		(substituted in) 65'
SH	21	Giorgi Begadze		(substituted in) 75'
CE	22	Lasha Malaghuradze		(substituted in) 3'
FB	23	Merab Kvirikashvili		(substituted in) 65'
Coach:
(New Zealand) Milton Haig

Touch judges:
Graham Cooper (Australia)
Cam Stone (New Zealand)
Television match official:
Ian Smith (Australia)

Notes:

- David Feao, Sione Fifita, David Lolohea, Viliami Lolohea and Nasi Manu (all Tonga) made their international debuts.
- Jaba Bregvadze (Georgia) earned his 50th test cap.

9 June 2018
15:30 FJT (UTC+12)

(1 BP) Fiji	24–22	Samoa (1 BP)
Try: Murimurivalu 25' m Volavola 32' m Seniloli 38' c Goneva 50' c Con: Volavola (2/4) 39', 51'	Report	Try: Matavao 59' c J. Lam 68' m Polataivao 78' c Con: Pisi (1/1) 60'; Tuala (1/2) 79'; Pen: Pisi (1/1) 22'

ANZ National Stadium, Suva
Attendance: 1,500
Referee: Mike Fraser (New Zealand)

FB	15	Kini Murimurivalu
RW	14	Benito Masilevu		(substituted off) 62'
OC	13	Jale Vatubua	(yellow card) 8' to 18'
IC	12	Sevanaia Galala
LW	11	Vereniki Goneva			(substituted off) 69'	(substituted in) 77'
FH	10	Ben Volavola
SH	9	Henry Seniloli		(substituted off) 62'
N8	8	Akapusi Qera (c)	(yellow card) 28' to 38'
OF	7	Viliame Mata
BF	6	Dominiko Waqaniburotu		(substituted off) 55'
RL	5	Leone Nakarawa
LL	4	Api Ratuniyarawa		(substituted off) 76'
TP	3	Manasa Saulo		(substituted off) 76'
HK	2	Talemaitoga Tuapati		(substituted off) 67'
LP	1	Campese Ma'afu		(substituted off) 50'	(substituted in) 69'	(substituted off) 77'
Replacements:
HK	16	Veremalua Vugakoto		(substituted in) 67'
PR	17	Eroni Mawi	(yellow card) 67' to 77'	(substituted in) 50'
PR	18	Ropate Rinakama		(substituted in) 76'
LK	19	Sikeli Nabou		(substituted in) 76'
N8	20	Nemani Nagusa		(substituted in) 55'
SH	21	Serupepeli Vularika		(substituted in) 62'
FH	22	Alivereti Veitokani		(substituted in) 62'
WG	23	Timoci Nagusa
Coach:
(New Zealand) John McKee

FB	15	Ahsee Tuala
RW	14	Ed Fidow
OC	13	Rey Lee-Lo	(substituted off) 28'	(substituted in) 40'
IC	12	Alapati Leiua
LW	11	Sinoti Sinoti			(substituted off) 49'
FH	10	Tusi Pisi	(substituted off) 70'
SH	9	Melani Matavao	(substituted off) 70'
N8	8	Mat Luamanu	(substituted off) 49'
OF	7	Jack Lam
BF	6	Piula Faʻasalele
RL	5	Chris Vui (c)
LL	4	Josh Tyrell	(substituted off) 61'
TP	3	Paul Alo-Emile	(substituted off) 55'
HK	2	Motu Matu'u	(substituted off) 61'
LP	1	Logovi'i Mulipola	(substituted off) 40'
Replacements:
HK	16	Seilala Lam	(substituted in) 61'
PR	17	Jordan Lay	(substituted in) 40'
PR	18	Viliamu Afatia	(substituted in) 55'
LK	19	Joe Tekori	(substituted in) 61'
FL	20	TJ Ioane	(substituted in) 49'
SH	21	Dwayne Polataivao	(substituted in) 70'
FH	22	Rodney Iona	(substituted in) 70'
WG	23	Paul Perez	(substituted in) 28'	(substituted off) 40'	(substituted in) 49'
Coach:
(Samoa) Fuimaono Tafua

Touch judges:
Jérôme Garcès (France)
Jordan Way (Australia)
Television match official:
Ian Smith (Australia)

Notes:

- Sevanaia Galala, Eroni Mawi, Alivereti Veitokani and Veremalua Vugakoto (all Fiji) and Rodney Iona, Ed Fidow and Mat Luamanu (all Samoa) made their international debuts.
- Vereniki Goneva (Fiji) earned his 50th test cap.

=== Round 2 ===
16 June 2018
13:00 FJT (UTC+12)

Tonga	28–18	Samoa
Try: Lolohea 6' c Vuna 18' c Latu 59' m Con: Takulua (2/3) 7', 19'; Pen: Takulua (3/3) 31', 49', 58'	Report	Try: Fidow 75' m Matavao 80' c Con: Pisi (1/2) 80'; Pen: Tuala (2/2) 13', 23'

ANZ National Stadium, Suva
Referee: Brendon Pickerill (New Zealand)

FB	15	David Halaifonua		(substituted off) 51'
RW	14	Viliami Lolohea
OC	13	Nafi Tuitavake
IC	12	Siale Piutau (c)		8' to 13'
LW	11	Cooper Vuna
FH	10	Kurt Morath
SH	9	Sonatane Takulua
N8	8	Nasi Manu		(substituted off) 53'
OF	7	Fotu Lokotui
BF	6	Steve Mafi
RL	5	Joe Tuineau		(substituted off) 48'
LL	4	Leva Fifita
TP	3	Siua Halanukonuka		(substituted off) 54'
HK	2	Paul Ngauamo	(yellow card) 79' to 80'
LP	1	Siegfried Fisiihoi		(substituted off) 72'
Replacements:
HK	16	Sosefo Sakalia	(yellow card) 68' to 78'		(substituted in) 67'
PR	17	David Feao		(substituted in) 72'
PR	18	Ben Tameifuna		(substituted in) 54'
N8	25	Valentino Mapapalangi		(substituted in) 48'	(substituted off) 67'
FL	26	Maama Vaipulu		(substituted in) 53'
SH	21	Shinnosuke Tu'umoto'oa
CE	22	Latiume Fosita		(substituted in) 8'	(substituted off) 13'
WG	23	Penikolo Latu		(substituted in) 51'
Coach:
(Australia) Toutai Kefu

FB	15	Ahsee Tuala	(substituted off) 63'
RW	14	Paul Perez
OC	13	Alofa Alofa	(substituted off) 61'
IC	12	Alapati Leiua
LW	11	Sinoti Sinoti
FH	10	Tusi Pisi
SH	9	Dwayne Polataivao	(substituted off) 54'
N8	8	Jack Lam	(substituted off) 71'
OF	7	TJ Ioane
BF	6	Piula Faʻasalele
RL	5	Chris Vui (c)
LL	4	Joe Tekori	(substituted off) 54'
TP	3	Viliamu Afatia	(substituted off) 67'
HK	2	Seilala Lam	(substituted off) 67'
LP	1	Jordan Lay	(substituted off) 40'
Replacements:
HK	16	Elia Elia	(substituted in) 67'
PR	17	James Lay	(substituted in) 67'
PR	18	Paul Alo-Emile	(substituted in) 40'
LK	19	Brandon Nansen	(substituted in) 54'
FL	20	Ofisa Treviranus	(substituted in) 71'
SH	21	Melani Matavao	(substituted in) 54'
FH	22	Rodney Iona	(substituted in) 63'
WG	23	Ed Fidow	(substituted in) 61'
Coach:
(Samoa) Fuimaono Tafua

Touch judges:
Graham Cooper (Australia)
Cam Stone (New Zealand)
Television match official:
Aaron Paterson (New Zealand)

16 June 2018
15:30 FJT (UTC+12)

(1 BP) Fiji	37–15	Georgia
Try: Seniloli (2) 14' m, 17' m Vatubua 49' c Lomani (2) 62' c, 78' m Radradra 80+3' m Con: Nadolo (2/4) 50', 63'; Pen: Nadolo (1/1) 55'	Report	Try: Kolelishvili 23' c Todua 39' m Con: Matiashvili (1/2) 24'; Pen: Matiashvili (1/2) 9'

ANZ National Stadium, Suva
Referee: Jérôme Garcès (France)

FB	15	Kini Murimurivalu	(substituted off) 66'
RW	14	Vereniki Goneva
OC	13	Semi Radradra
IC	12	Jale Vatubua	(substituted off) 78'
LW	11	Nemani Nadolo
FH	10	Ben Volavola
SH	9	Henry Seniloli	(substituted off) 61'
N8	8	Viliame Mata	(substituted off) 61'
OF	7	Akapusi Qera (c)
BF	6	Dominiko Waqaniburotu
RL	5	Leone Nakarawa
LL	4	Api Ratuniyarawa	(substituted off) 72'
TP	3	Manasa Saulo	(substituted off) 64'
HK	2	Veremalua Vugakoto	(substituted off) 78'
LP	1	Campese Ma'afu	(substituted off) 71'
Replacements:
HK	16	Ratunaisa Navuma	(substituted in) 78'
PR	17	Eroni Mawi	(substituted in) 71'
PR	18	Mosese Ducivaki	(substituted in) 64'
LK	19	Sikeli Nabou	(substituted in) 72'
N8	20	Nemani Nagusa	(substituted in) 61'
SH	21	Frank Lomani	(substituted in) 61'
FH	22	Alivereti Veitokani	(substituted in) 78'
WG	23	Timoci Nagusa	(substituted in) 66'
Coach:
(New Zealand) John McKee

FB	15	Soso Matiashvili
RW	14	Tamaz Mchedlidze	(substituted off) 68'
OC	13	Davit Kacharava
IC	12	Lasha Malaghuradze	(substituted off) 66'
LW	11	Alexander Todua
FH	10	Lasha Khmaladze
SH	9	Vasil Lobzhanidze	(substituted off) 55'
N8	8	Otar Giorgadze	(substituted off) 52'
OF	7	Viktor Kolelishvili
BF	6	Giorgi Tsutskiridze
RL	5	Konstantin Mikautadze	(substituted off) 52'
LL	4	Giorgi Nemsadze (c)
TP	3	Levan Chilachava	(substituted off) 40'
HK	2	Shalva Mamukashvili	(substituted off) 71'
LP	1	Karlen Asieshvili	(substituted off) 55'
Replacements:
HK	16	Giorgi Chkoidze	(substituted in) 71'
PR	17	Zurab Zhvania	(substituted in) 55'
PR	18	Giorgi Melikidze	(substituted in) 40'
LK	19	Nodar Tcheishvili	(substituted in) 52'
LK	20	Shalva Sutiashvili	(substituted in) 52'
SH	21	Giorgi Begadze	(substituted in) 55'
CE	22	Giorgi Kveseladze	(substituted in) 66'
FB	23	Merab Kvirikashvili	(substituted in) 68'
Coach:
(New Zealand) Milton Haig

Touch judges:
Mike Fraser (New Zealand)
Jordan Way (Australia)
Television match official:
Aaron Paterson (New Zealand)

Notes:

- Semi Radradra (Fiji) made his international debut.
- This was Fiji's largest winning margin over Georgia, surpassing the 5-point difference set in 2012, and their first win over Georgia in Fiji.

== Statistics ==
=== Points scorers ===
Pos	Name	Team	Pts
1	Soso Matiashvili	Georgia	21
2	Sonatane Takulua	Tonga	16
3	Henry Seniloli	Fiji	15
4	Viliami Lolohea	Tonga	10
4	Frank Lomani	Fiji	10
4	Melani Matavao	Samoa	10
7	Ben Volavola	Fiji	9
8	Ahsee Tuala	Samoa	8
9	Nemani Nadolo	Fiji	7
9	Tusi Pisi	Samoa	7

=== Try scorers ===
Pos	Name	Team	Tries
1	Henry Seniloli	Fiji	3
2	Viliami Lolohea	Tonga	2
2	Frank Lomani	Fiji	2
2	Melani Matavao	Samoa	2
5	14 players		1

== Squads ==
Nation	Head coach	Captain
Fiji	(New Zealand) John McKee	Akapusi Qera
Georgia	(New Zealand) Milton Haig	Giorgi Nemsadze
Samoa	(Samoa) Fuimaono Tafua	Chris Vui
Tonga	(Tonga) Toutai Kefu	Siale Piutau

Note: Number of caps and players' ages are indicated as of 9 June 2018 – the tournament's opening day, pre first tournament match.

=== Fiji ===
On 30 May, John McKee finalised a 32-man squad for the Pacific Nations Cup and their June test match against Tonga.

Player	Position	Date of birth (age)	Caps	Club/province
Ratunaisa Navuma	Hooker		1	(Fiji) Nadroga
Talemaitoga Tuapati	Hooker	August 16, 1985 (aged 32)	41	(France) Provence
Veremalua Vugakoto	Hooker	December 29, 1997 (aged 20)	0	(Fiji) Nadroga
Mosese Ducivaki	Prop	February 28, 1991 (aged 27)	1	(Fiji) Naitasiri
Campese Ma'afu	Prop	December 19, 1984 (aged 33)	50	(England) Northampton Saints
Eroni Mawi	Prop	June 2, 1996 (aged 22)	0	(Fiji) Naitasiri
Peni Ravai	Prop	June 16, 1990 (aged 27)	24	(France) Bordeaux Bègles
Ropate Rinakama	Prop	January 17, 1988 (aged 30)	2	(France) Grenoble
Manasa Saulo	Prop	April 6, 1989 (aged 29)	35	(England) London Irish
Kalivati Tawake	Prop	November 16, 1988 (aged 29)	7	(Australia) Waratahs
Sikeli Nabou	Lock	March 5, 1988 (aged 30)	4	(France) Biarritz Olympique
Leone Nakarawa	Lock	April 2, 1988 (aged 30)	47	(France) Racing 92
Api Ratuniyarawa	Lock	July 11, 1986 (aged 31)	28	(England) Northampton Saints
Albert Tuisue	Lock	June 6, 1993 (aged 25)	0	(Australia) West Harbour
Viliame Mata	Flanker	October 22, 1991 (aged 26)	4	(Scotland) Edinburgh
Akapusi Qera (c)	Flanker	April 24, 1984 (aged 34)	62	(France) Agen
Mosese Voka	Flanker	June 7, 1985 (aged 33)	5	(Fiji) Suva
Dominiko Waqaniburotu	Flanker	April 20, 1986 (aged 32)	37	(France) Brive
Nemani Nagusa	Number 8	June 21, 1988 (aged 29)	13	(France) Aurillac
Frank Lomani	Scrum-half	April 18, 1996 (aged 22)	3	(Fiji) Naitasiri
Henry Seniloli	Scrum-half	June 15, 1989 (aged 28)	19	(Romania) Timișoara Saracens
Serupepeli Vularika	Scrum-half	April 29, 1990 (aged 28)	9	(Fiji) Suva
Alivereti Veitokani	Fly-half	November 2, 1992 (aged 25)	0	(Fiji) Namosi
Ben Volavola	Fly-half	January 13, 1991 (aged 27)	22	(France) Bordeaux Bègles
Sevanaia Galala	Centre	January 29, 1993 (aged 25)	0	(France) Brive
Semi Radradra	Centre	June 13, 1992 (aged 25)	0	(France) Toulon
Jale Vatubua	Centre	August 30, 1991 (aged 26)	7	(France) Pau
Vereniki Goneva	Wing	April 5, 1984 (aged 34)	49	(England) Newcastle Falcons
Benito Masilevu	Wing	October 7, 1989 (aged 28)	9	(France) Brive
Nemani Nadolo	Wing	January 31, 1988 (aged 30)	28	(France) Montpellier
Timoci Nagusa	Wing	July 14, 1987 (aged 30)	31	(France) Montpellier
Josua Tuisova	Wing	February 4, 1994 (aged 24)	5	(France) Toulon
Kini Murimurivalu	Fullback	May 15, 1989 (aged 29)	21	(France) La Rochelle

=== Georgia ===
On 1 June, Head Coach Milton Haig finalised a 32-man touring squad for the Pacific Nations Cup and their June test match against Japan.

Player	Position	Date of birth (age)	Caps	Club/province
Jaba Bregvadze	Hooker	24 April 1987 (aged 31)	49	(Japan) Sunwolves
Giorgi Chkoidze	Hooker	17 May 1991 (aged 27)	4	(Georgia (country)) Jiki Gori
Shalva Mamukashvili	Hooker	2 October 1990 (aged 27)	55	(Georgia (country)) Locomotive
Karlen Asieshvili	Prop	21 April 1987 (aged 31)	31	(France) Brive
Levan Chilachava	Prop	17 August 1991 (aged 26)	39	(France) Toulon
Giorgi Melikidze	Prop	24 May 1996 (aged 22)	8	(France) Stade Français
Irakli Mirtskhulava	Prop	22 December 1988 (aged 29)	11	(France) Oyonnax
Giorgi Tetrashvili	Prop	31 August 1993 (aged 24)	9	(France) Agen
Zurab Zhvania	Prop	17 October 1991 (aged 26)	33	(France) Stade Français
Konstantin Mikautadze	Lock	1 July 1991 (aged 26)	54	(France) Montpellier
Giorgi Nemsadze (c)	Lock	26 September 1984 (aged 33)	82	(England) Bristol
Shalva Sutiashvili	Lock	24 January 1984 (aged 34)	67	(France) Angouleme
Nodar Tcheishvili	Lock	13 November 1990 (aged 27)	12	(France) Chambéry
Otar Giorgadze	Flanker	2 March 1996 (aged 22)	11	(France) Clermont
Viktor Kolelishvili	Flanker	9 October 1989 (aged 28)	48	(France) Clermont
Guram Shengelia	Flanker	10 October 1992 (aged 25)	2	(Georgia (country)) Jiki Gori
Saba Shubitidze	Flanker	7 April 1994 (aged 24)	10	(Georgia (country)) Academy
Giorgi Tsutskiridze	Flanker	26 October 1996 (aged 21)	8	(France) Aurillac
Mikheil Gachechiladze	Number 8	24 December 1990 (aged 27)	6	(Russia) Enisei-STM
Giorgi Begadze	Scrum-half	4 March 1986 (aged 32)	60	(Georgia (country)) Locomotive
Vasil Lobzhanidze	Scrum-half	14 October 1996 (aged 21)	33	(France) Brive
Vazha Khutsishvili	Scrum-half	27 March 1993 (aged 25)	24	(Georgia (country)) Kharebi
Revaz Jinchvelashvili	Fly-half	18 August 1995 (aged 22)	8	(Georgia (country)) Armazi
Lasha Khmaladze	Fly-half	20 January 1988 (aged 30)	63	(Georgia (country)) Batumi
Davit Kacharava	Centre	16 January 1985 (aged 33)	109	(Russia) Enisei-STM
Giorgi Kveseladze	Centre	11 November 1997 (aged 20)	8	(Georgia (country)) Armazi
Lasha Malaghuradze	Centre	2 January 1986 (aged 32)	84	(Russia) Krasny Yar
Tamaz Mchedlidze	Centre	17 March 1993 (aged 25)	47	(France) Agen
Soso Matiashvili	Wing	27 January 1993 (aged 25)	10	(Georgia (country)) Lelo Saracens
Alexander Todua	Wing	2 November 1987 (aged 30)	72	(Georgia (country)) Lelo Saracens
Anzor Sitchinava	Wing	8 September 1995 (aged 22)	7	(Georgia (country)) Academy
Merab Kvirikashvili	Fullback	27 December 1983 (aged 34)	111	(Georgia (country)) Lelo Saracens
Beka Tsiklauri	Fullback	9 February 1989 (aged 29)	30	(Georgia (country)) Locomotive

=== Samoa ===
On 22 May, Titimaea Tafua named a 28-man squad for the Pacific Nations Cup and Samoa's 2019 Rugby World Cup two-test play-off series against a yet to be decided team.

Note: Flags indicate national union for the club/province as defined by World Rugby.

Player	Position	Date of birth (age)	Caps	Club/province
Elia Elia	Hooker	22 January 1996 (aged 22)	5	(England) Harlequins
Seilala Lam	Hooker	18 February 1989 (aged 29)	6	(France) Perpignan
Motu Matu'u	Hooker	30 April 1987 (aged 31)	12	(England) Gloucester
Viliamu Afatia	Prop	24 March 1990 (aged 28)	17	(France) Racing 92
Paul Alo-Emile	Prop	22 December 1991 (aged 26)	4	(France) Stade Français
James Lay	Prop	16 December 1993 (aged 24)	4	(England) Bristol Bears
Jordan Lay	Prop	5 November 1992 (aged 25)	5	(Scotland) Edinburgh
Logovi'i Mulipola	Prop	11 March 1987 (aged 31)	20	(England) Leicester Tigers
Brandon Nansen	Lock	3 November 1993 (aged 24)	1	(France) Stade Français
Joe Tekori	Lock	17 December 1983 (aged 34)	34	(France) Toulouse
Josh Tyrell	Lock	16 October 1990 (aged 27)	2	(England) Doncaster Knights
Chris Vui (c)	Lock	11 February 1993 (aged 25)	8	(England) Bristol Bears
Piula Faʻasalele	Flanker	22 January 1988 (aged 30)	12	(France) Toulouse
TJ Ioane	Flanker	9 May 1989 (aged 29)	13	(England) Sale Sharks
Ofisa Treviranus	Flanker	30 March 1984 (aged 34)	38	(England) London Irish
Jack Lam	Flanker	18 November 1987 (aged 30)	25	(England) Bristol Bears
Mat Luamanu	Number 8	4 March 1988 (aged 30)	0	(England) Harlequin
Melani Matavao	Half-back	19 November 1995 (aged 22)	3	(New Zealand) Harbour RFC
Dwayne Polataivao	Half-back	30 July 1990 (aged 27)	5	(New Zealand) Northcote RFC
Rodney Iona	First five-eighth	17 August 1991 (aged 26)	0	(Australia) Western Force
Tusi Pisi	First five-eighth	18 June 1982 (aged 35)	30	(England) Bristol
Rey Lee-Lo	Centre	20 February 1986 (aged 32)	17	(Wales) Cardiff Blues
Alapati Leiua	Centre	21 September 1988 (aged 29)	18	(England) Bristol
Alofa Alofa	Wing	12 March 1991 (aged 27)	3	(England) Harlequin
Ed Fidow	Wing	11 September 1993 (aged 24)	0	(France) Bordeaux
Paul Perez	Wing	26 July 1986 (aged 31)	22	(France) Toulouse
Sinoti Sinoti	Wing	9 September 1985 (aged 32)	5	(England) Newcastle Falcons
Ahsee Tuala	Fullback	23 August 1989 (aged 28)	10	(England) Northampton Saints

=== Tonga ===
On 21 May, Toutai Kefu named a 30-man squad for the Pacific Nations Cup and their June test match against Fiji.

Player	Position	Date of birth (age)	Caps	Club/province
Sione Lea	Hooker	12 January 1987 (aged 31)	5	(New Zealand) Clifton
Paul Ngauamo	Hooker	19 February 1990 (aged 28)	12	(France) Agen
Sosefo Sakalia	Hooker	14 December 1991 (aged 26)	2	(Romania) Steaua București
Paea Faʻanunu	Prop	4 November 1988 (aged 29)	7	(France) Dax
David Feao	Prop	6 October 1990 (aged 27)	0	(France) Narbonne
Vunipola Fifita	Prop	28 February 1996 (aged 22)	0	(Australia) Souths
Siegfried Fisiihoi	Prop	8 June 1987 (aged 31)	2	(France) Stade Français
Siua Halanukonuka	Prop	9 August 1986 (aged 31)	6	(Scotland) Glasgow Warriors
David Lolohea	Prop	26 February 1992 (aged 26)	0	(Australia) West Harbour
Ben Tameifuna	Prop	30 August 1991 (aged 26)	3	(France) Racing 92
Daniel Faleafa	Lock	13 February 1989 (aged 29)	15	(France) Colomiers
Leva Fifita	Lock	29 July 1989 (aged 28)	5	(France) Grenoble
Steve Mafi	Lock	9 December 1989 (aged 28)	25	(France) Castres
Joe Tuineau	Lock	18 August 1981 (aged 36)	28	(France) Dax
Michael Faleafa	Flanker	3 February 1992 (aged 26)	3	(France) Perpignan
Fotu Lokotui	Flanker	19 March 1992 (aged 26)	2	(New Zealand) Patumahoe
Maama Vaipulu	Flanker	21 July 1989 (aged 28)	2	(France) Castres
Nasi Manu	Number 8	15 August 1988 (aged 29)	0	(Italy) Benetton
Valentino Mapapalangi	Number 8	18 July 1993 (aged 24)	6	(England) Leicester Tigers
Sonatane Takulua	Half-back	11 January 1991 (aged 27)	25	(England) Newcastle Falcons
Shinnosuke Tu'umoto'oa	Half-back	11 June 1994 (aged 23)	1	(Japan) NEC Green Rockets
Kurt Morath	First five-eighth	13 November 1984 (aged 33)	30	(United States) Utah Warriors
George Taina	First five-eighth	21 October 1995 (aged 22)	2	(New Zealand) Pakuranga United
Latiume Fosita	Centre	25 July 1992 (aged 25)	24	(New Zealand) Papatoetoe
Siale Piutau (c)	Centre	13 October 1985 (aged 32)	32	(England) Bristol
Nafi Tuitavake	Centre	21 January 1989 (aged 29)	8	(England) Northampton Saints
Sione Fifita	Wing	17 April 1990 (aged 28)	0	(Australia) Parramatta
Penikolo Latu	Wing	17 June 1993 (aged 24)	2	(New Zealand) University of Waikato
Viliami Lolohea	Wing	4 July 1993 (aged 24)	0	(New Zealand) Papatoetoe
Cooper Vuna	Wing	5 July 1987 (aged 30)	6	(England) Worcester Warriors
David Halaifonua	Fullback	5 July 1987 (aged 30)	25	(England) Gloucester

== See also ==
- 2018 mid-year rugby union internationals
