= Melani Matavao =

Samoan rugby union and sevens player

- Born: 19 November 1995 (age 30) Motoʻotua, Samoa
- Height: 1.71 m (5 ft 7 in)
- Weight: 73 kg (161 lb; 11 st 7 lb)
- School: St. Joseph's College

Rugby union career
- Position: Scrum-half
Senior career
Years	Team	Apps	(Points)
2018	Otago	7	(5)
- Correct as of 28 August 2023
International career
Years	Team	Apps	(Points)
2015	Samoa U20	3	(0)
2017–	Samoa	13	(40)
- Correct as of 28 August 2023
National sevens team
Years	Team		Comps
2019–	Samoa		20
- Correct as of 28 August 2023

Melani Matavao (born 19 November 1995) is a Samoan professional rugby union player who plays as a scrum-half for the Samoa national team.

== Club career ==
Matavao has come through Samoa's PPS Super 9 competition as a key player for the Aana Chiefs. In 2018 he was given a place with Otago under World Rugby's Pacific Combine scheme, playing 7 games in the 2018 Mitre 10 Cup season.

In 2019 he signed for the Asia Pacific Dragons, but did not play any matches with the team.

== International career ==
In 2015 Matavao was selected for the Samoan Under 20 side for the U20 World Championship in Italy. In 2016 he was selected for Samoa A.

He was selected for the Samoan national team in 2017, making his debut in a test against Scotland in Edinburgh. He played for Samoa in the 2018 World Rugby Pacific Nations Cup. He was decisive in Samoa's qualification for the 2019 Rugby World Cup, scoring two tries in a qualifier against Germany.

In February 2019 he was selected for the first time for the Samoa Sevens. He was then named to Samoa's Rugby World Cup squad. After the world cup, he played in the 2020 world sevens series.

Matavao was selected for the Samoan squad to the 2022 Rugby World Cup Sevens in Cape Town.
