= Ropate Rinakama =

Fiji international rugby union player (born 1988)

- Born: 17 January 1988 (age 38)
- Height: 6 ft 0 in (183 cm)
- Weight: 273 lb (124 kg)
- School: Mount Albert Grammar School

Rugby union career
- Position: Prop
Senior career
Years	Team	Apps	(Points)
2017–18	FC Grenoble	7	(0)
2019–20	Worcester Warriors	3	
Provincial / State sides
Years	Team	Apps	(Points)
2013, 2019	North Harbour	7	(0)
2017–18	Northland	21	(5)
2021–22	Manawatu	6	(0)
International career
Years	Team	Apps	(Points)
2017–18	Fiji	3	(0)

Ropate Rinakama (born 17 January 1988) is a Fijian rugby union player.

== Biography ==
Born in Fiji, Rinakama took up a scholarship to finish his schooling at Auckland's Mount Albert Grammar School.

A tighthead prop, Rinakama played provincial rugby in New Zealand for North Harbour, Northland and Manawatu. He also had stints in Europe as short-term injury cover at FC Grenoble in 2017-18 and the Worcester Warriors in 2019–20.

Rinakama was capped twice during Fiji's 2017 end of year Northern Hemisphere tour and gained a third cap for the Flying Fijians against Samoa in a 2018 Pacific Nations Cup match in Suva.

== See also ==
- List of Fiji national rugby union players
