= Emerick Setiano =

France international rugby union player

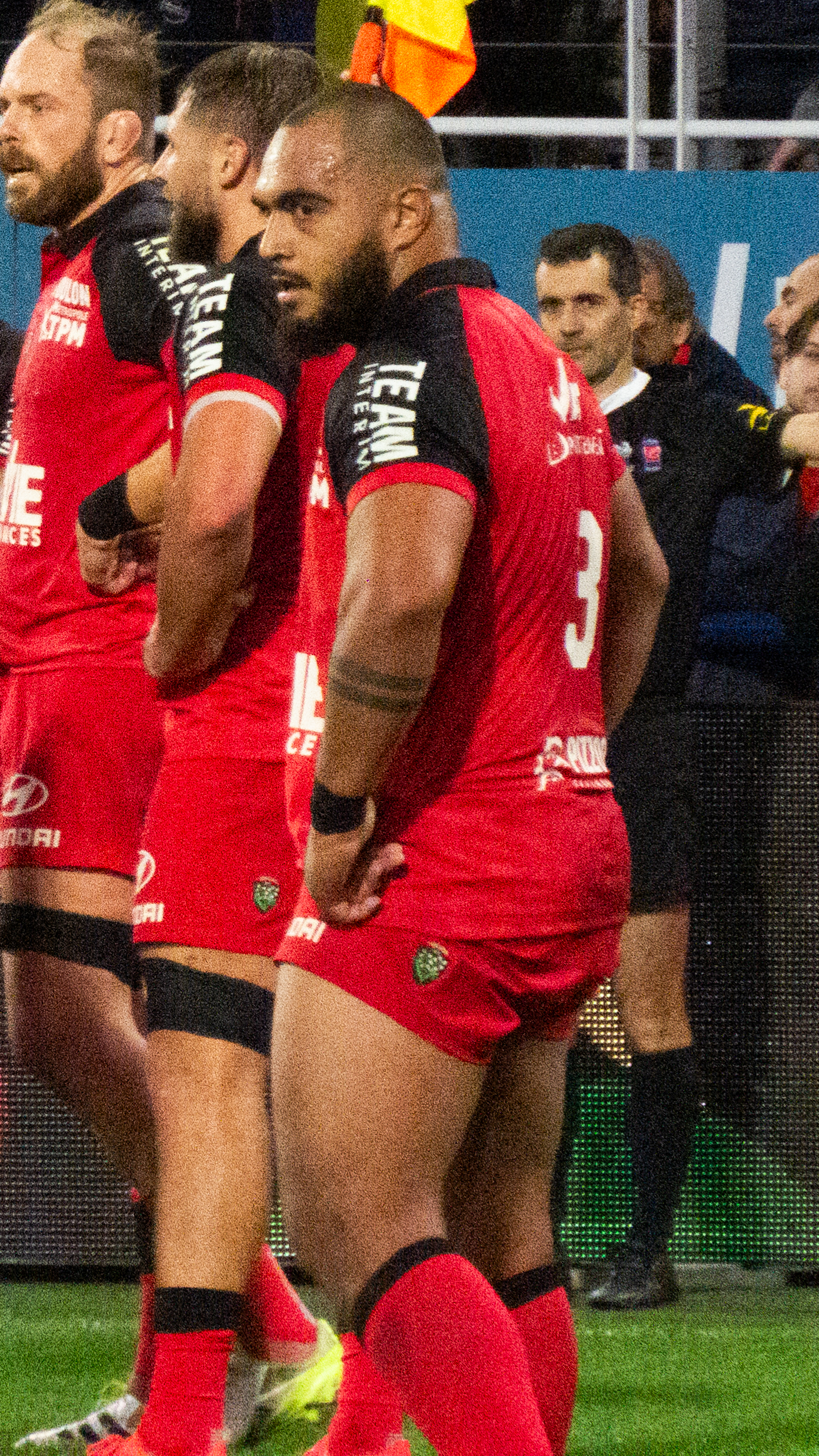
- Born: Emerick Setiano; 19 July 1996 (age 30) Angers, France
- Height: 1.85 m (6 ft 1 in)
- Weight: 114 kg (17 st 13 lb; 251 lb)

Rugby union career
- Position: Prop
- Current team: Bayonne
Amateur team(s)
Years	Team	Apps	(Points)
- SCO Angers
- Tours
2014–2016	Toulon		
Senior career
Years	Team	Apps	(Points)
2016–2025	Toulon	158	(5)
2025–	Bayonne	7	(0)
- Correct as of 22 October 2025
International career
Years	Team	Apps	(Points)
2016	France U20	10	(0)
2019–	France	6	(0)
- Correct as of 20 October 2019

Emerick Setiano (born 19 July 1996) is a French rugby union player. His position is prop and he currently plays for Bayonne in the Top 14.
