= Eroni Mawi =

Fiji international rugby union player (born 1996)

- Full name: Eroni Cama Talemaisolomoni Mawi
- Born: 6 February 1996 (age 30) Lautoka, Fiji
- Height: 189 cm (6 ft 2 in)
- Weight: 131 kg (289 lb; 20 st 9 lb)
- School: Lelean Memorial School

Rugby union career
- Position: Loosehead Prop
- Current team: Saracens
Amateur team(s)
Years	Team	Apps	(Points)
–	Naitasiri	–	(–)
Senior career
Years	Team	Apps	(Points)
2017–2018	Fijian Drua	18	(5)
2019	Fijian Latui	–	(–)
2020–	Saracens	75	(40)
- Correct as of 16 February 2025
International career
Years	Team	Apps	(Points)
2015–2016	Fiji U20	5	(6)
2017–2019	Fiji Warriors	7	(10)
2018–	Fiji	50	(10)
- Correct as of 16 February 2025

Eroni Cama Talemaisolomoni Mawi (born 6 February 1996) is a Fijian professional rugby union player, who currently plays for Saracens in England's Premiership Rugby, and the Fijian national team. He previously represented Fijian Latui in Global Rapid Rugby and Fijian Drua in Australia's National Rugby Championship. His primary position is loosehead prop.

== Club career ==
=== Fiji ===
Mawi started his career with the amateur team Naitasiri, playing in the Fijian national championship.

In 2017, Mawi joined the new Fijian Drua team, which competed in the Australian National Rugby Championship. For his first professional season, he played in nine matches. The following season, he helped the Drua to clinch the NRC title, featuring in the team's victory in the final against Queensland Country.

In 2019, Mawi joined the Fijian Latui, which had been integrated into the newly created Global Rapid Rugby competition.

=== Saracens ===
In February 2020, Mawi was recruited by the English Premiership club Saracens, initially on a short-term deal, to replace the injured loosehead prop Ralph Adams-Hale. After this stint, he was retained in the London club's squad for the 2020–21 season.

During the 2021–22 Premiership season, Mawi extended his stay with Saracens up to 2024. He played in 17 league matches during the team's run to the Premiership final, which they lost to Leicester Tigers.

Mawi helped Saracens to win the 2022–23 Premiership title, making 18 appearances throughout the season, including a start in the final, where the team defeated Sale Sharks by a score of 35–25. The following year, he signed a new long-term contract with Saracens, keeping him at the club until 2027.

== International career ==
Mawi played for the Fiji U20 team in 2015 and 2016, competing in the World Rugby U20 Championship during both years. In 2017, he was selected by the Fiji Warriors, to play in the World Rugby Pacific Challenge.

Mawi received his first senior call-up to represent Fiji in June 2018, ahead of the 2018 Pacific Nations Cup. He earned his first international cap on 9 June, during a match against Samoa in Suva.

In August 2019, Mawi was named in Fiji's squad for the 2019 Rugby World Cup in Japan. He made three appearances during the competition.

In August 2023, Mawi was selected in Fiji's 33-man squad for the 2023 Rugby World Cup in France. He started all five of the team's matches, as they reached the tournament's knockout stage for the first time since 2007.
