= Brandon Nansen =

- Born: 3 November 1993 (age 33)
- Height: 1.98 m (6 ft 6 in)
- Weight: 121 kg (19 st 1 lb; 267 lb)
- School: Sacred Heart College, Auckland

Rugby union career
- Position: Lock / Loose forward
- Current team: Dragons
Youth career
- 2009–2011: Auckland
Senior career
| Years | Team | Apps | (Points) |
| 2013–2017 | North Harbour | 40 | (5) |
| 2017 | Blues | | |
| 2017-2018 | Stade Français | 5 | |
| 2018-2020 | Dragons | 17 | (0) |
| 2020-2021 | Brive | 5 | (0) |
| 2021- | Northampton Saints | 0 | (0) |
- Correct as of 3 November 2016
International career
| Years | Team | Apps | (Points) |
| 2011 | New Zealand Schoolboys | | |
| 2017 | Samoa | 3 | (0) |
- Correct as of 25 October 2018

Brandon Nansen (born 3 November 1993) is a New Zealand rugby union player who currently plays as a lock or loose forward for Northampton Saints. Previously Nansen represented North Harbour in New Zealand's provincial rugby tournament and the Blues in Super Rugby, for the Dragons in the Pro14 and for Stade Français Paris and CA Brive in the French Top14. He has also played internationally for Samoa.

== Early life ==
Nansen attended Sacred Heart College and represented Auckland at under-16 and under-18 level.

== Club career ==
He started his senior career in 2013, playing for North Harbour. He quickly became a regular in the side and went on to make 9 appearances for them as they lifted the Mitre 10 Cup Championship in 2016 and earned the right to play in the Premiership in 2017.

Solid performances for North Harbour over the course of four seasons culminated in their promotion to the Mitre 10 Cup Premiership, and Nansen was named as a member of the Blues squad for the 2017 Super Rugby season.

Nansen joined the Welsh regional team the Dragons for the 2018-19 season.

On 3 July 2020, Nansen leaves Dragons to return to France to sign for Brive in the Top 14 for the 2020-21 season.

On 29 May 2021, Nansen moves to England to join Northampton Saints in the Premiership Rugby ahead of the 2021-22 season.

== International career ==
Nansen was a New Zealand Schoolboys representative in 2011, where he played in a side that featured future All Blacks; Ardie Savea and Patrick Tuipulotu.

== Career honours ==
North Harbour

- Mitre 10 Cup Championship – 2016
