= Ratu Veremalua Vugakoto =

Fijian rugby union player (born 1997)

- Born: Ratu Veremalua Taukanoa Vugakoto; 29 December 1997 (age 28) Daviqele, Naukelevu, Kadavu
- Height: 6 ft (183 cm)
- Weight: 17 st 2 lb (240 lb; 109 kg)
- School: Nelson Boys College, Sigatoka

Rugby union career
- Position: Hooker
- Current team: Utah Warriors
Senior career
Years	Team	Apps	(Points)
2018	Fijian Drua	3	(0)
2019	Fijian Latui		
2020	Utah Warriors		
- Correct as of 7 September 2019
International career
Years	Team	Apps	(Points)
2018	Fiji	6	(0)
- Correct as of 7 September 2019

Ratu Veremalua Taukanoa Vugakoto, also known as Tuvere Vugakoto (born 29 December 1997) is a Fijian rugby player who plays for the Utah Warriors in Major League Rugby (MLR).

He previously played for Fijian Latui in Global Rapid Rugby and the Fijian national rugby team. He was educated at Nelson College in New Zealand, where he played for the school's 1st XV rugby team. His primary position is hooker.

In August 2019, he was named to Fiji's squad for the 2019 Rugby World Cup.
