= David Halaifonua =

Tonga international rugby union player

- Born: Tevita David Halaifonua; 5 July 1987 (age 39) Vava'u, Tonga
- Height: 1.89 m (6 ft 2 in)
- Weight: 104 kg (16 st 5 lb; 229 lb)
- School: Tupou College

Rugby union career
- Position(s): Wing, Fullback
Senior career
Years	Team	Apps	(Points)
2013–2014	Warringah	3	(0)
2014	US Bergerac		
2014	Kandy SC		
2014–2018	Gloucester	45	(60)
2018–2020	Coventry	29	(27)
2020–2021	Ampthill	3	(10)
2021-2022	London Scottish	13	(5)
2022-2023	SC 1880 Frankfurt		
2023-	Hull	15	(10)
- Correct as of 7 July 2023
International career
Years	Team	Apps	(Points)
2009–2019	Tonga	33	(27)
2020-2021	Tonga 7s		
- Correct as of 7 July 2023

David Halaifonua (born July 5, 1987) is a Tongan national rugby union player who currently plays for Hull RUFC in the National League 2 North and for the Tonga national team.

Halaifonua first played club rugby for Warringah, a rugby union club located in New South Wales, Australia, that compete in their competitions, the Shute Shield and the Tooheys New Cup. He then moved to France as he signed a contract for US Bergerac, who compete in Federale 1, the third level of domestic competition in France.

During the 2013–14 season, Halaifonua joined fellow Tongans Hale T-Pole and Paula Kaho in Sri Lanka. He played for the Sri Lanka champions Kandy SC.

On 4 December 2014, Halaifonua officially signed for English side Gloucester Rugby who compete in the Aviva Premiership from the 2014–15 season.

Halaifonua made his international debut for Tonga in the 2009 IRB Pacific Nations Cup losing 22–36 to Fiji.

On 26 April 2018, David left Gloucester, having played 44 times, to sign for newly promoted side Coventry in the RFU Championship from the 2018–19 season.

He joined London Scottish ahead of the 2020–21 season.
