= Sevanaia Galala =

Fijian rugby union player (born 1993)

- Full name: Sevanaia Galala Sekaia
- Born: 29 January 1993 (age 33) Fiji
- Height: 188 cm (6 ft 2 in)
- Weight: 104 kg (229 lb; 16 st 5 lb)

Rugby union career
- Position: Centre / Wing
- Current team: Brive
Senior career
Years	Team	Apps	(Points)
2011–	Brive	154	(130)
- Correct as of 1 November 2021
International career
Years	Team	Apps	(Points)
2012–2013	Fiji U20	5	(5)
2018–	Fiji	4	(0)
- Correct as of 1 November 2021

Sevanaia Galala (born 29 January 1993 in Fiji) is a Fijian rugby union player who plays for Brive in the Top 14. His playing position is centre or wing. Galala has represented Brive since 2011. He made his debut for Fiji in 2018 against Samoa.
