= Otar Giorgadze =

Georgian rugby union player

- Born: 2 March 1996 (age 30) Tbilisi, Georgia
- Height: 1.94 m (6 ft 4 in)
- Weight: 110 kg (17 st 5 lb)

Rugby union career
- Position(s): Flanker, lock
Senior career
| Years | Team | Apps | (Points) |
| 2015-2018 | Clermont | 7 | (5) |
| 2018-2022 | Brive | 50 | (60) |
| 2022-2024 | Montauban | 27 | (10) |
| 2024-2025 | Valence Romans | 6 | (0) |
| 2025- | The Black Lion | | |
- Correct as of 16 July 2025
International career
| Years | Team | Apps | (Points) |
| 2015–2016 | Georgia U20 | 13 | (10) |
| 2015- | Georgia | 42 | (65) |
- Correct as of 16 July 2025

Otar Giorgadze (born March 2, 1996) is a Georgian Rugby Union player. His position is flanker and he currently plays for The Black Lion in Georgia and the Georgia national team.
