= Tamaz Mchedlidze =

- Born: Tamaz Mchedlidze; 17 March 1993 (age 33) Tbilisi, Georgia
- Height: 1.95 m (6 ft 5 in)
- Weight: 110 kg (17 st 5 lb; 240 lb)

Rugby union career
- Position(s): Wing; Centre
Senior career
Years	Team	Apps	(Points)
2012–2013	Mont-de-Marsan	6	(0)
2013–2014	Bourg-en-Bresse	14	(0)
2014–2019	Agen	84	(75)
International career
Years	Team	Apps	(Points)
2013–2021	Georgia	61	(35)
- Correct as of 13 April 2023

Tamaz Mchedlidze (born 17 March 1993 in Georgia) is a former Georgian rugby union player. He played at wing and centre and was able to cover the back row.

== Club career ==
Mchedlidze began his rugby career in Tbilisi with the club 'Universiteti'. He then played for the Georgian Premiership team Armia Tbilisi. In 2012, he joined the Top 14 side Stade Montois and played in five European Challenge Cup games and one Top 14 game during the season. The following year, he joined Union Sportive Bressane, who had just been promoted to the Pro D2. Mchedlidze played 14 games for the team, but the team was relegated. Mchedlidze joined Agen during summer 2014.

== International career ==
Mchedlidze made his debut for the Georgia national team against Belgium on 2 February 2013 during the European Nations Cup. He scored his first two international tries on 9 March 2013 against Spain.
