= Giorgi Chkoidze =

Georgian rugby union player

- Born: 17 May 1991 (age 35) Tbilisi, Georgia
- Height: 1.81 m (5 ft 11 in)
- Weight: 106 kg (234 lb; 16 st 10 lb)

Rugby union career
- Position: Hooker
- Current team: The Black Lion
Senior career
Years	Team	Apps	(Points)
2014–2018	Jiki Gori	47	(20)
2018–2019	Lelo Saracens		
2019–2022	Lokomotiv Penza		
2022–	The Black Lion	5	(5)
- Correct as of 12 May 2023
International career
Years	Team	Apps	(Points)
2017–	Georgia	30	(35)
- Correct as of 12 May 2023

Giorgi Chkoidze (Georgian: გიორგი ჭყოიძე; born 17 May 1991) is a Georgian professional rugby union player who plays as a hooker for Super Cup club The Black Lion and the Georgia national team.
