= Henry Seniloli =

Fijian rugby union player (born 1989)

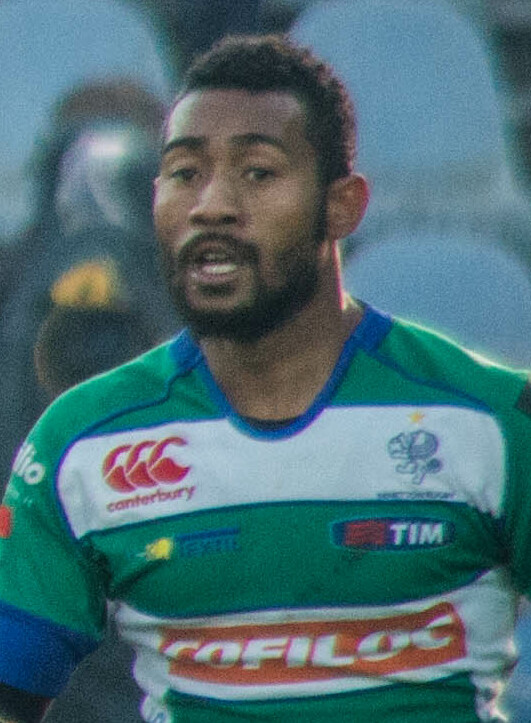
- Born: Henry Ratu Wainiu Seniloli; 15 June 1989 (age 37) Tavua, Fiji
- Height: 175 cm (5 ft 9 in)
- Weight: 75 kg (165 lb; 11 st 11 lb)

Rugby union career
- Position: Scrum-half
Senior career
| Years | Team | Apps | (Points) |
| – | Tailevu Knights | | |
| 2014–15 | Treviso | 10 | (10) |
| 2017−18 | Timișoara Saracens | 5 | (5) |
| 2018−19 | Doncaster Knights | 11 | (7) |
| 2020 | Colorno | | |
- Correct as of 7 September 2019
International career
| Years | Team | Apps | (Points) |
| 2009 | Fiji Under 20 | 4 | (2) |
| 2016 | Fiji Warriors | 7 | (10) |
| 2013– | Fiji | 26 | (50) |
- Correct as of 7 September 2019
National sevens team
| Years | Team | | Comps |
| 2014 | Fiji | | 9 |

Henry Ratu Wainiu Seniloli (born 15 June 1989) is a Fijian rugby union player who currently plays as a Scrum-half for Benetton Treviso. He made his debut for Fiji against Romania on 23 November 2013.
