= Lasha Malaghuradze =

Georgian rugby union player

- Born: 2 January 1986 (age 40) Tbilisi, Georgian SSR, Soviet Union
- Height: 1.92 m (6 ft 3 1/2 in)
- Weight: 95 kg (14 st 13 lb; 209 lb)

Rugby union career
- Position(s): Fly-half, Centre
Senior career
Years	Team	Apps	(Points)
-2008	Kochebi		
2008-2011	Béziers	38	(178)
2011-2012	Rhône		
2012-2016	Bagnères	66	(522)
2016-	Krasny Yar	16	(117)
- Correct as of 4 September 2017
International career
Years	Team	Apps	(Points)
- Georgia U21
2008-2020	Georgia	100	(187)
- Correct as of 14 July 2021

Lasha Malaghuradze (Georgian: ლაშა მალაღურაძე; born 2 June 1986 in Tbilisi) is a Georgian rugby union player. His usual position is fly-half.

He played for Qochebi Tbilisi, where he won 2007 Georgia Championship, before moving to AS Béziers Hérault (2008/09-2010/11). He also played for Stade Bagnérais (2012/13-2015/16), before moving to Krasny Yar Krasnoyarsk, in Russia, where he plays since 2016/17.

After playing for Georgia Under-21 team, he made his debut for Georgia in 2008 against Portugal. He has 90 caps for Georgia, since 2008, with 5 tries, 37 conversions, 25 penalties and 3 drop goals scored, 183 points on aggregate.
