= Dwayne Polataivao =

Samoan rugby union player

- Born: 30 July 1990 (age 36) Samoa
- Height: 1.75 m (5 ft 9 in)
- Weight: 92 kg (14 st 7 lb; 203 lb)
- School: De La Salle College

Rugby union career
- Position: Scrum-half
Senior career
Years	Team	Apps	(Points)
2019	Doncaster Knights	5	(0)
2020	Utah Warriors	5	(10)
- Correct as of 5 September 2020
Provincial / State sides
Years	Team	Apps	(Points)
2015	Auckland	1	(0)
2020	Tasman	7	(0)
- Correct as of 14 November 2020
Super Rugby
Years	Team	Apps	(Points)
2020, 2022	Moana Pasifika	3	(0)
- Correct as of 3 April 2022
International career
Years	Team	Apps	(Points)
2016–2021	Samoa	21	(20)
- Correct as of 3 April 2022

Dwayne E. Polataivao (born 30 July 1990) is a Samoan rugby union player. A scrum-half, he played for Moana Pasifika in Super Rugby in 2022. He has also represented Samoa internationally.

== Career ==
Dwayne was educated at De La Salle College, Māngere East.

He started his professional career playing for the Auckland in 2015, and was first selected for the Samoa national team in 2016.

He joined the Doncaster Knights in 2019.

He was selected for the Samoa national squad ahead of the 2019 World Rugby Pacific Nations Cup.

In September 2020 he was named in the Tasman Mako squad for the 2020 Mitre 10 Cup. He played 7 games for the Mako in the 2020 season as they won their second premiership title in a row.

Polataivao was named in the Moana Pasifika squad to play the Maori All Blacks in late 2020, coming off the bench and scoring a try in a 28-21 loss.
