= Leva Fifita =

Tongan rugby union player

- Full name: Salesi Halaleva Lapota Fifita
- Born: 29 July 1989 (age 37) Neiafu, Tonga
- Height: 1.94 m (6 ft 4 in)
- Weight: 118 kg (260 lb; 18 st 8 lb)
- Notable relative: Vaea Fifita (brother)

Rugby union career
- Position: Lock
- Current team: Oyonnax
Senior career
Years	Team	Apps	(Points)
2016–2017	Waikato	12	(0)
2017–2021	Grenoble	65	(40)
2021–2023	Connacht	24	(10)
2023–present	Oyonnax	2	(0)
- Correct as of 4 September 2023
International career
Years	Team	Apps	(Points)
2009	Tonga U20	4	(5)
2017–	Tonga	28	(20)
- Correct as of 21 June 2023

Salesi Halaleva Lapota Fifita (born 29 July 1989) is a Tongan professional rugby union player who plays as a lock for Top 14 club Oyonnax Rugby and the Tonga national team.

== Professional career ==
=== Club ===
Fifita started his professional career in 2016 playing for Waikato, having previously played for Hamilton Old Boys. In February 2017 he trained with the Chiefs development squad, but not play any of the three friendly matches scheduled for the team.

In December 2017 he joined Rugby Pro D2 team FC Grenoble as a replacement for Mickaël Capelli. In March 2018 he extended his contract until June 2019. He later extended his contract for three more seasons. In June 2021 he activated his departure clause early, leaving Grenoble and signing with Irish team Connacht. He made his debut for the club in September 2021.

He joins Oyonnax Rugby in August 2023.

=== International ===
He made his international debut for Tonga against Wales on 16 June 2017. He was also part of the Tongan team which emerged as runners-up to Fiji at the 2017 World Rugby Pacific Nations Cup. He was included in the Tongan squad for the 2019 Rugby World Cup in Japan. He played four games in this competition, against England, Argentina, France and the United States. He was selected again to play against Scotland in Tonga's 2021 tour of the northern hemisphere.
