= Josh Tyrell =

- Born: 16 October 1990 (age 36) New Zealand
- Height: 1.94 m (6 ft 4 in)
- Weight: 117 kg (258 lb)

Rugby union career
- Position: Lock
Senior career
Years	Team	Apps	(Points)
2018–2019	Doncaster Knights		
2019–2021	Oyonnax		
2021–2023	Biarritz		
2023–Present	Provence		
Provincial / State sides
Years	Team	Apps	(Points)
2013–2016	Waikato		
2016–2018	North Harbour		
International career
Years	Team	Apps	(Points)
2017-2019	Samoa	8	(5)

Josh Tyrell is a New Zealand-born rugby union lock who has played for Samoa internationally.
