= Karlen Asieshvili =

Georgian rugby union player

- Born: 21 April 1987 (age 39) Chokhatauri, Georgia
- Height: 1.81 m (5 ft 11 in)
- Weight: 119 kg (262 lb; 18 st 10 lb)

Rugby union career
- Position: Prop
Senior career
Years	Team	Apps	(Points)
2005-2010	Kochebi Bolnisi		
2010–2011	Orthez	19	(0)
2011–2013	Aurillac	44	(0)
2013–2020	Brive	129	(60)
2020-2022	Rouen	34	(0)
- Correct as of 18 September 2026
International career
Years	Team	Apps	(Points)
2008–2019	Georgia	35	(30)
- Correct as of 18 September 2026

Karlen Asieshvili (born 21 April 1987) is a Georgian rugby union player. His position is prop, and he currently plays for Brive in the Top 14 and the Georgia national team. He played for Georgia in the 2015 Rugby World Cup.
