= Jale Vatubua =

Fiji international rugby union & league player

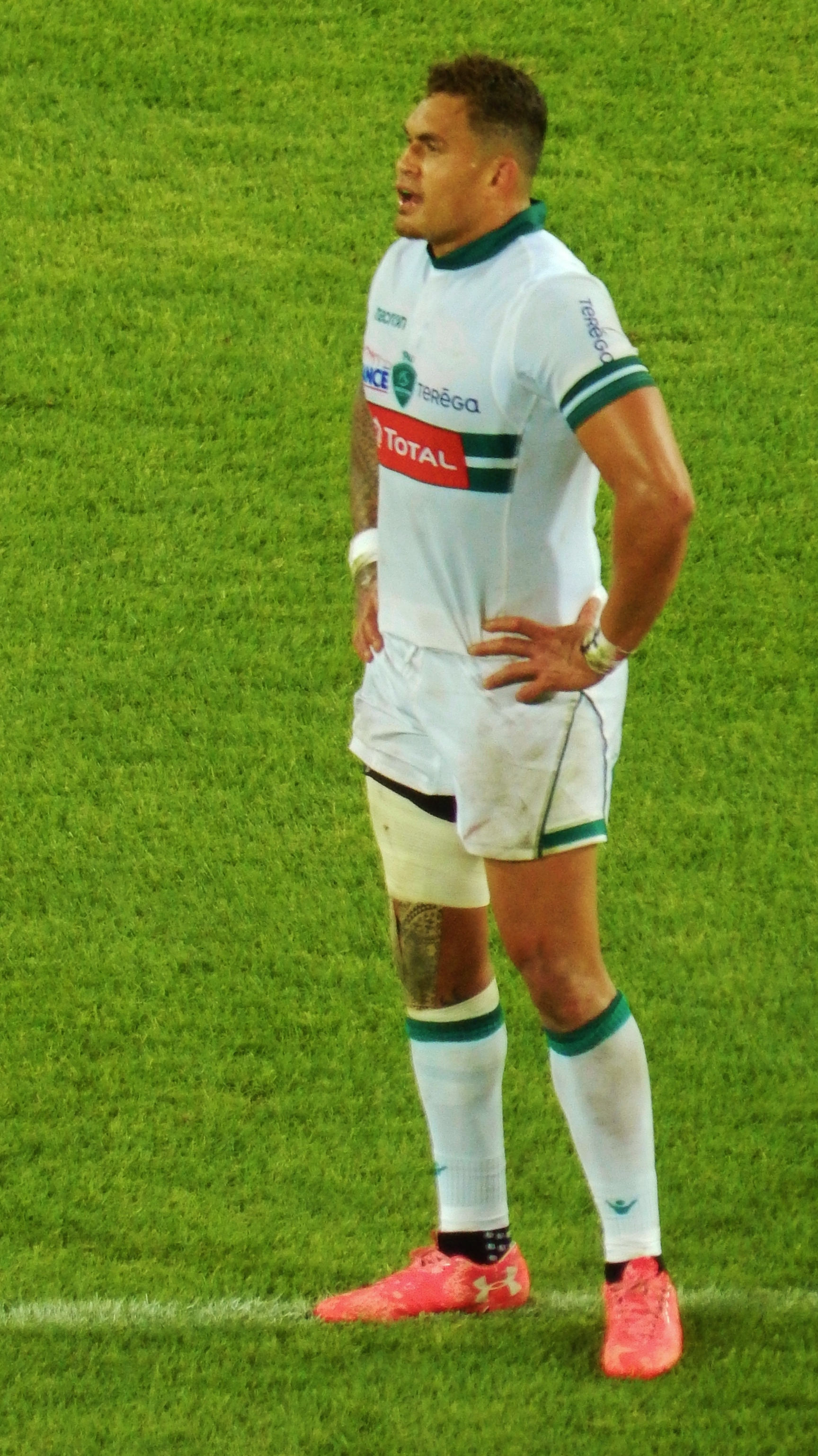
- Jale Vatubua
- Full name: Jale Kaikadavu Vatubua
- Born: 30 August 1991 (age 35) Fiji
- Height: 1.89 m (6 ft 2 in)
- Weight: 112 kg (17 st 9 lb; 247 lb)
- Occupation: rugby player

Rugby union career
- Position: Centre
- Current team: Pau
Senior career
Years	Team	Apps	(Points)
2009–10	Waikato	2	(0)
2010–12	Melbourne Rebels	8	(0)
2012-	Pau	182	((110))
- Correct as of 11 October 2017
International career
Years	Team	Apps	(Points)
2017–present	Fiji	15	(15)
- Correct as of 7 September 2019
- Rugby league career

Playing information
Club
Years	Team	Pld	T	G	FG	P
2026–	Saint-Gaudens Bears
- As of 13 November 2026

Jale Kaikadavu Vatubua (born 30 August 1991) is a Fijian former rugby union player and current rugby league player for Saint-Gaudens Bears in the Super XIII. His usual position is as a centre, He previously for Pau in the Top 14 and the Fiji national team.
