= Giorgi Melikidze =

- Born: Giorgi Melikidze; 24 June 1996 (age 30) Georgia
- Height: 1.79 m (5 ft 11 in)
- Weight: 117 kg (18 st 6 lb)

Rugby union career
- Position(s): Prop; Hooker
- Current team: Stade Français
Youth career
- 2015: Stade Français
Senior career
Years	Team	Apps	(Points)
2015–	Stade Français	182	(80)
- Correct as of 13 July 2021
International career
Years	Team	Apps	(Points)
2016–	Georgia	29	(15)
- Correct as of 13 July 2021

Giorgi Melikidze (born 24 May 1996) is a Georgian rugby union player. His position is prop, and he currently plays for Stade Français in the Top 14 and the Georgia national team.
