= Vunipola Fifita =

Australian rugby union player

- Born: 28 February 1996 (age 30) Tonga
- Height: 180 cm (5 ft 11 in)
- Weight: 118 kg (260 lb; 18 st 8 lb)
- School: Newington College

Rugby union career
- Position: Prop
Amateur team(s)
Years	Team	Apps	(Points)
2014	Randwick		
2016	Southern Districts		
2017	West Harbour		
Senior career
Years	Team	Apps	(Points)
2018–	Canberra Vikings	8	(0)
- Correct as of 11 September 2019
Super Rugby
Years	Team	Apps	(Points)
2019–	Brumbies	1	(0)
- Correct as of 11 September 2019
International career
Years	Team	Apps	(Points)
2015	Tonga U20	3	(5)
2016	Australia U20	3	(0)
2019	Tonga	2	(0)
- Correct as of 11 September 2019

Vunipola Fifita (born 28 February 1996 in Tonga) is an Australian rugby union player who plays for the Brumbies in Super Rugby. His playing position is prop. He has signed for the Brumbies squad in 2019. He came to Australia from his native Tonga to attend Newington College (2012 – 2014) at the age of 15.
