= Kalivati Tawake =

Fijian rugby union player

- Born: Kalivati Tawake; 16 November 1988 (age 37) Fiji
- Height: 182 cm (6 ft 0 in)
- Weight: 124 kg (19 st 7 lb; 273 lb)

Rugby union career
- Position: Prop
- Current team: CA Périgueux Dordogne
Senior career
Years	Team	Apps	(Points)
2017	Fijian Drua	6	(0)
2018–	Biarritz Olympique	29	(5)
–	CA Périgueux Dordogne		
Super Rugby
Years	Team	Apps	(Points)
2017–2018	Waratahs	2	(0)
International career
Years	Team	Apps	(Points)
2016–	Fiji	13	(5)

Kalivati Tawake (born 16 November 1988) is a Fijian rugby union player who plays for CA Périgueux Dordogne. His position of choice is prop.

Tawake has played for Fijian Drua, the New South Wales Waratahs and Biarritz Olympique.

He currently (2021) plays for CA Périgueux Dordogne in France as a prop.

He has made 13 international appearances for Fiji, scoring 5 points. In 2019, Tawake suffered a knee injury playing for Fiji against Tonga ruling him out of the rugby world cup squad.

Tawake moved to CA Périgueux Dordogne in 2023, playing 16 games for the club in the 2023/24 season.
