= 2019 World Rugby Pacific Nations Cup =

Tournament details
- Countries: Canada; Fiji; Japan; Samoa; Tonga; United States
- Date: 27 July – 10 August 2019

Tournament statistics
- Teams: 6
- Matches played: 9
- Tries scored: 54 (6 per match)
- Top point scorer(s): (Japan) Yu Tamura (39 Pts)
- Top try scorer(s): (Japan) Kenki Fukuoka (Japan) Kotaro Matsushima (3 tries)

Final
- Champions: Japan (3rd title)
- Runners-up: Fiji

The 2019 World Rugby Pacific Nations Cup was the 14th Pacific Nations Cup, an annual international rugby union competition contested by the men's national teams of the Tier 2 rugby nations located around the Pacific: Canada, Fiji, Japan, Samoa, Tonga and the United States. Japan won their second outright Pacific Nations Cup (and their third overall, having shared the 2014 title with Samoa), winning all three of their matches with try-scoring bonus points to finish top of the standings with 15 points.

== Format ==
The tournament used a cross-pool format. The six national teams were divided into two pools of three. Each team played three matches, one against each of the teams in the opposite pool. The tournament placings were decided on the number of points accumulated from all matches.

== Standings ==
Overall standings
Pos	Team	Pld	W	D	L	PF	PA	PD	TF	TA	TB	LB	Pts
1	Japan	3	3	0	0	109	48	+61	14	6	3	0	15
2	Fiji	3	2	0	1	69	50	+19	10	6	1	0	9
3	United States	3	2	0	1	80	63	+17	9	8	1	0	9
4	Samoa	3	1	0	2	38	40	−2	4	5	0	2	6
5	Tonga	3	1	0	2	57	89	−32	9	12	1	0	5
6	Canada	3	0	0	3	55	118	−63	8	17	1	0	1

Updated to match(es) played on unknown. Source: rugbyarchive.net
Rules for classification:
- 4 points for a win
- 2 points for a draw
- 1 bonus point for a loss by seven points or less
- 1 bonus point for scoring four or more tries in a match

Pool A standings
Pos	Team	Pld	W	D	L	PF	PA	PD	TF	TA	TB	LB	Pts
1	Fiji	3	2	0	1	69	50	+19	10	6	1	0	9
2	United States	3	2	0	1	80	63	+17	9	8	1	0	9
3	Tonga	3	1	0	2	57	89	−32	9	12	1	0	5

Source: rugbyarchive.net

Pool B standings
Pos	Team	Pld	W	D	L	PF	PA	PD	TF	TA	TB	LB	Pts
1	Japan	3	3	0	0	109	48	+61	14	6	3	0	15
2	Samoa	3	1	0	2	38	40	−2	4	5	0	2	6
3	Canada	3	0	0	3	55	118	−63	8	17	1	0	1

Source: rugbyarchive.net

== Fixtures ==
There were five fixtures played in Fiji, two in Japan, and one each in Samoa and United States. Neutral referees and television match officials were appointed for all matches.

=== Round 1 ===
27 July 2019
15:00 WST (UTC+13)

Samoa	25–17	Tonga
Try: Leiua 43' c Amosa 71' c Tuatagaloa 79' m Con: Seuteni (1/1) 44'; Alatimu (1/2) 72'; Pen: Seuteni (2/2) 21', 49'	Report	Try: Vuna 10' m Tameifuna 40' m Sakalia 58' c Con: Faiva (1/3) 59'

Apia Park, Apia
Referee: Mike Fraser (New Zealand)

Team details

FB	15	Ahsee Tuala
RW	14	Johnny Vaili	(substituted off) 68'
OC	13	Alapati Leiua
IC	12	Rey Lee-Lo
LW	11	Belgium Tuatagaloa
FH	10	UJ Seuteni	(substituted off) 68'
SH	9	Auvasa Faleali'i	(substituted off) 68'
N8	8	Afa Amosa
OF	7	TJ Ioane	(substituted off) 71'
BF	6	Chris Vui
RL	5	Kane Leaupepe
LL	4	Filo Paulo	(substituted off) 54'
TP	3	Paul Alo-Emile	(substituted off) 77'
HK	2	Motu Matu'u (c)	(substituted off) 52'
LP	1	Logovi'i Mulipola	(substituted off) 52'
Replacements:
HK	16	Ray Niuia	(substituted in) 52'
PR	17	Jordan Lay	(substituted in) 52'
PR	18	Alofaaga Sao	(substituted in) 77'
LK	19	Senio Toleafoa	(substituted in) 54'
FL	20	Almanda Motuga	(substituted in) 71'
SH	21	Dwayne Polataivao	(substituted in) 68'
FH	22	AJ Alatimu	(substituted in) 68'
WG	23	Jamie-Jerry Taulagi	(substituted in) 68'
Coach:
Steve Jackson

FB	15	Nafi Tuitavake
RW	14	David Halaifonua		(substituted off) 40'
OC	13	Mali Hingano
IC	12	Cooper Vuna
LW	11	Viliami Lolohea
FH	10	James Faiva
SH	9	Sami Fisilau		(substituted off) 55'
N8	8	Sione Vailanu		(substituted off) 49'
OF	7	Maama Vaipulu			Substituted off
BF	6	Zane Kapeli
RL	5	Sam Lousi		(substituted off) 40'
LL	4	Leva Fifita
TP	3	Ben Tameifuna		(substituted off) 40'
HK	2	Elvis Taione (c)		(substituted off) 53'	(substituted in) 70'
LP	1	Paea Faʻanunu		(substituted off) 67'
Replacements:
HK	16	Sosefo Sakalia	(yellow card) 70' to 80'	(substituted in) 53'
PR	17	Toma Taufa		(substituted in) 67'
PR	18	Maʻafu Fia		(substituted in) 40'	(substituted off) 72'
LK	19	Onehunga Havili		(substituted in) 40'
PR	20	Siua Halanukonuka			(substituted in) 72'
FL	21	Fotu Lokotui	(yellow card) 66' to 76'	(substituted in) 49'
SH	22	Leon Fukofuka		(substituted in) 55'
WG	23	Otumaka Mausia		(substituted in) 40'
Coach:
Toutai Kefu

Touch judges:
Graham Cooper (Australia)
Kaveni Talemaivalagi (Fiji)
In Goal Judges:
Avii Faalupega (Samoa)
Posi Isamaeli (Samoa)

Notes:

- Afa Amosa, Senio Toleafoa, Alofaaga Sao, UJ Seuteni, Belgium Tuatagaloa and Johnny Vaili made their test debut for Samoa.
- James Faiva, Mali Hingano, Sam Lousi, Otumaka Mausia and Toma Taufa made their test debut for Tonga.

27 July 2019
14:50 JST (UTC+09)

Japan	34–21	Fiji
Try: Fukuoka 6' m Matsushima (2) 19' c, 55' m Lafaele 22' c Himeno 30' c Con: Tamura (3/5) 19', 24', 32'; Pen: Tamura (1/1) 2'	Report	Try: Botia 12' c S. Matavesi (2) 38' c, 60' c Con: Volavola (3/3) 13', 39', 61'

Kamaishi Recovery Memorial Stadium, Kamaishi
Attendance: 13,135
Referee: Luke Pearce (England)

Team details

FB	15	Will Tupou	(substituted off) 61'
RW	14	Kotaro Matsushima
OC	13	Timothy Lafaele
IC	12	Ryoto Nakamura
LW	11	Kenki Fukuoka	(substituted off) 60'
FH	10	Yu Tamura
SH	9	Kaito Shigeno	(substituted off) 57'
N8	8	Amanaki Mafi	(substituted off) 60'
OF	7	Lappies Labuschagné (c)	(substituted off) 33'
BF	6	Kazuki Himeno
RL	5	Luke Thompson
LL	4	James Moore
TP	3	Asaeli Ai Valu	(substituted off) 61'
HK	2	Shota Horie	(substituted off) 61'
LP	1	Keita Inagaki	(substituted off) 71'
Replacements:
HK	16	Atsushi Sakate	(substituted in) 61'
PR	17	Shogo Miura	(substituted in) 71'
PR	18	Yusuke Kizu	(substituted in) 61'
LK	19	Wimpie van der Walt	(substituted in) 60'
FL	20	Michael Leitch	(substituted in) 33'
SH	21	Yutaka Nagare	(substituted in) 57'
FH	22	Rikiya Matsuda	(substituted in) 67'
WG	23	Lomano Lemeki	(substituted in) 60'
Coach:
Jamie Joseph

FB	15	Alivereti Veitokani		(substituted off) 61'
RW	14	Filipo Nakosi	(yellow card) 29' to 39'	(substituted off) 50'
OC	13	Waisea Nayacalevu
IC	12	Levani Botia
LW	11	Patrick Osborne
FH	10	Ben Volavola
SH	9	Frank Lomani		(substituted off) 74'
N8	8	Viliame Mata		(substituted off) 57'
OF	7	Semi Kunatani
BF	6	Dominiko Waqaniburotu (c)
RL	5	Leone Nakarawa
LL	4	Albert Tuisue		(substituted off) 46'
TP	3	Manasa Saulo		(substituted off) 46'
HK	2	Sam Matavesi		(substituted off) 61'
LP	1	Eroni Mawi		(substituted off) 48'
Replacements:
HK	16	Mesu Dolokoto		(substituted in) 61'
PR	17	Peni Ravai		(substituted in) 48'
PR	18	Lee Roy Atalifo		(substituted in) 46'
LK	19	Api Ratuniyarawa		(substituted in) 46'
FL	20	Peceli Yato		(substituted in) 57'
SH	21	Henry Seniloli		(substituted in) 74'
CE	22	Jale Vatubua		(substituted in) 50'
CE	23	Josh Matavesi		(substituted in) 61'
Coach:
John McKee

Touch judges:
Mike Adamson (Scotland)
Cam Stone (New Zealand)
Television match official:
Glenn Newman (New Zealand)

Notes:

- Yusuke Kizu, Lappies Labuschagné and James Moore (all Japan) and Filipo Nakosi (Fiji) made their international debut.
- This was Japan's first win over Fiji since their 24–13 win during the 2011 IRB Pacific Nations Cup.
- This was Fiji's first loss in the Pacific Nations Cup since their 18-13 defeat to Samoa in 2014.

27 July 2019
18:00 PDT (UTC-07)

United States	47–19	Canada
Try: Fawsitt 10' c Scully 24' c Landry 61' c Moore 64' m Pifeleti 69' m De Haas 78' c Con: MacGinty (3/4) 11', 24', 62'; Hooley (1/2) 79'; Pen: MacGinty (3/4) 36', 40', 47'	Report	Try: Ardron 42' c Penalty try 77'; Trainor 80' m Con: Nelson (1/2) 43'

Infinity Park, Glendale
Attendance: 5,000
Referee: Andrew Brace (Ireland)

Team details

FB	15	Will Hooley
RW	14	Blaine Scully (c)			(substituted off) 73'
OC	13	Marcel Brache		(substituted off) 40'
IC	12	Bryce Campbell
LW	11	Martin Iosefo
FH	10	AJ MacGinty		(substituted off) 66'
SH	9	Shaun Davies		(substituted off) 58'
N8	8	Cam Dolan
OF	7	John Quill
BF	6	Malon Al-Jiboori		(substituted off) 66'
RL	5	Nick Civetta				(substituted off) 65'
LL	4	Ben Landry		45' to 53'
TP	3	Paul Mullen		(substituted off) 66'
HK	2	Dylan Fawsitt		(substituted off) 58'	(substituted in) 73'
LP	1	Chance Wenglewski		(substituted off) 63'
Replacements:
HK	16	Kapeli Pifeleti	(yellow card) 73' to 80'	(substituted in) 58'
PR	17	David Ainuu		(substituted in) 63'
PR	18	Paddy Ryan		(substituted in) 66'
LK	19	Greg Peterson		(substituted in) 45'	(substituted off) 53'	(substituted in) 65'
N8	20	Jamason Fa'anana Schultz		(substituted in) 66'
SH	21	Ruben de Haas		(substituted in) 58'
CE	22	Gannon Moore		(substituted in) 40'
WG	23	Madison Hughes		(substituted in) 66'
Coach:
Gary Gold

FB	15	Pat Parfrey	(substituted off) 62'
RW	14	Conor Trainor
OC	13	Ben LeSage
IC	12	Ciaran Hearn
LW	11	D. T. H. van der Merwe
FH	10	Peter Nelson
SH	9	Phil Mack	(substituted off) 69'
N8	8	Tyler Ardron (c)
OF	7	Matt Heaton	(substituted off) 37'
BF	6	Kyle Baillie
RL	5	Conor Keys	(substituted off) 66'
LL	4	Evan Olmstead
TP	3	Cole Keith	(substituted off) 58'
HK	2	Benoît Piffero	(substituted off) 58'
LP	1	Hubert Buydens	(substituted off) 58'
Replacements:
HK	16	Andrew Quattrin	(substituted in) 58'
PR	17	Rob Brouwer	(substituted in) 58'
PR	18	Jake Ilnicki	(substituted in) 58'
FL	19	Justin Blanchet	(substituted in) 37'
N8	20	Luke Campbell	(substituted in) 66'
SH	21	Gordon McRorie	(substituted in) 69'
FH	22	Shane O'Leary	(substituted in) 62'
CE	23	Nick Blevins
Coach:
Kingsley Jones

Touch judges:
Ben Whitehouse (Wales)
Ludovic Cayre (France)
Television match official:
David Grashoff (England)

Notes:

- Jamason Fa'anana Schultz (United States) and Peter Nelson and Andrew Quattrin (both Canada) made their international debuts.

=== Round 2 ===
3 August 2019
14:30 FJT (UTC+12)

United States	13–10	Samoa
Try: MacGinty 19' c Con: MacGinty (1/1) 20'; Pen: MacGinty (2/2) 2', 80'	Report	Try: Leiua 5' c Con: Alatimu (1/1) 6'; Pen: Taefu (1/1) 72'

ANZ National Stadium, Suva, Fiji
Referee: Nigel Owens (Wales)

Team details

FB	15	Will Hooley
RW	14	Blaine Scully (c)
OC	13	Bryce Campbell
IC	12	Paul Lasike
LW	11	Martin Iosefo	(substituted off) 64'
FH	10	AJ MacGinty
SH	9	Ruben de Haas
N8	8	Cam Dolan	(substituted off) 43'
OF	7	John Quill
BF	6	Tony Lamborn
RL	5	Greg Peterson
LL	4	Ben Landry	(substituted off) 69'
TP	3	Paul Mullen	(substituted off) 57'
HK	2	James Hilterbrand	(substituted off) 75'
LP	1	Chance Wenglewski	(substituted off) 57'
Replacements:
HK	16	Dylan Fawsitt	(substituted in) 75'
PR	17	David Ainuu	(substituted in) 57'
PR	18	Paddy Ryan	(substituted in) 57'
LK	19	Nate Brakeley	(substituted in) 69'
FL	20	Ben Pinkelman	(substituted in) 43'
SH	21	Nate Augspurger	(substituted in) 64'
FH	22	Will Magie
WG	23	Madison Hughes
Coach:
Gary Gold

FB	15	Ahsee Tuala
RW	14	Johnny Vaili	(substituted off) 46'
OC	13	Kieron Fonotia
IC	12	Henry Taefu
LW	11	Alapati Leiua
FH	10	AJ Alatimu	(substituted off) 46'
SH	9	Pele Cowley	(substituted off) 46'
N8	8	Piula Fa'asalele (c)	(substituted off) 43'
OF	7	TJ Ioane
BF	6	Henry Stowers	(substituted off) 55'
RL	5	Senio Toleafoa
LL	4	Filo Paulo
TP	3	James Lay	(substituted off) 56'
HK	2	Seilala Lam	(substituted off) 49'
LP	1	Jordan Lay	(substituted off) 56'
Replacements:
HK	16	Elia Elia	(substituted in) 49'
PR	17	Logovi'i Mulipola	(substituted in) 56'
PR	18	Alofaaga Sao	(substituted in) 56'
FL	19	Jack Lam	(substituted in) 55'
N8	20	Afa Amosa	(substituted in) 43'
SH	21	Auvasa Faleali'i	(substituted in) 46'
CE	22	Rey Lee-Lo	(substituted in) 46'
WG	23	Jamie-Jerry Taulagi	(substituted in) 46'
Coach:
Steve Jackson

Touch judges:
Damon Murphy (Australia)
Kaveni Talemaivalagi (Fiji)
In Goal Judges:
FRU Appt. (Fiji)
FRU Appt. (Fiji)

Notes:

- Ben Pinkelman (United States) and Henry Stowers (Samoa) made their international debuts.

3 August 2019
17:15 FJT (UTC+12)

Fiji	38–13	Canada
Try: Mata 8' m Yato 17' c Nakarawa 29' c Ravai 43' c Tuisova 48' m Dolokoto 67' c Con: Matavesi (4/6) 18', 30', 43', 68'	Report	Try: Lloyd 35' c Con: O'Leary (1/1) 36'; Pen: O'Leary (2/2) 4', 12'

ANZ National Stadium, Suva, Fiji
Referee: Mike Fraser (New Zealand)

Team details

FB	15	Kini Murimurivalu
RW	14	Josua Tuisova
OC	13	Semi Radradra
IC	12	Jale Vatubua	(substituted off) 57'
LW	11	Eroni Sau	(substituted off) 51'
FH	10	Josh Matavesi
SH	9	Henry Seniloli	(substituted off) 59'
N8	8	Viliame Mata
OF	7	Semi Kunatani
BF	6	Peceli Yato	(substituted off) 70'
RL	5	Leone Nakarawa (c)	(substituted off) 59'
LL	4	Tevita Ratuva
TP	3	Peni Ravai	(substituted off) 49'
HK	2	Tuvere Veremalua	(substituted off) 49'
LP	1	Campese Ma'afu	(substituted off) 50'
Replacements:
HK	16	Mesu Dolokoto	(substituted in) 49'
PR	17	Eroni Mawi	(substituted in) 50'
PR	18	Lee Roy Atalifo	(substituted in) 49'
LK	19	Tevita Cavubati	(substituted in) 59'
FL	20	Mosese Voka	(substituted in) 70'
SH	21	Nikola Matawalu	(substituted in) 59'
FH	22	Ben Volavola	(substituted in) 57'
WG	23	Patrick Osborne	(substituted in) 51'
Coach:
John McKee

FB	15	Peter Nelson	(substituted off) 67'
RW	14	Jeff Hassler
OC	13	Nick Blevins
IC	12	Ciaran Hearn
LW	11	Kainoa Lloyd
FH	10	Shane O'Leary	(substituted off) 60'
SH	9	Gordon McRorie
N8	8	Luke Campbell
OF	7	Lucas Rumball	(substituted off) 56'
BF	6	Justin Blanchet	(substituted off) 2'
RL	5	Kyle Baillie (c)	(substituted off) 45'
LL	4	Conor Keys
TP	3	Jake Ilnicki	(substituted off) 44'
HK	2	Eric Howard	(substituted off) 70'
LP	1	Rob Brouwer	(substituted off) 54'
Replacements:
HK	16	Andrew Quattrin	(substituted in) 70'
PR	17	Djustice Sears-Duru	(substituted in) 54'
PR	18	Matt Tierney	(substituted in) 44'
LK	19	Evan Olmstead	(substituted in) 45'
FL	20	Mike Sheppard	(substituted in) 2'
FL	21	Matt Heaton	(substituted in) 56'
SH	22	Jamie Mackenzie	(substituted in) 60'
CE	23	Conor Trainor	(substituted in) 67'
Coach:
Kingsley Jones

Touch judges:
Nick Briant (New Zealand)
Graham Cooper (Australia)
In Goal Judges:
FRU Appt. (Fiji)
FRU Appt. (Fiji)

Notes:

- Tevita Ratuva (Fiji) made his international debut.

3 August 2019
19:10 JST (UTC+09)

Japan	41–7	Tonga
Try: Mafi 9' c Valu 19' c Lafaele 28' c Matsushima 71' c Fukuoka 78' c Con: Tamura (5/5) 10', 22', 30', 72', 79'; Pen: Tamura (2/2) 49', 68'	Report	Try: Fifita 56' c Con: Takulua (1/1) 57'

Hanazono Rugby Stadium, Higashiōsaka
Attendance: 20,940
Referee: Jérôme Garcès (France)

Team details

FB	15	Will Tupou
RW	14	Kotaro Matsushima
OC	13	Timothy Lafaele
IC	12	Ryoto Nakamura	(substituted off) 58'
LW	11	Lomano Lemeki	(substituted off) 70'
FH	10	Yu Tamura
SH	9	Yutaka Nagare	(substituted off) 58'
N8	8	Amanaki Mafi
OF	7	Yoshitaka Tokunaga	(substituted off) 64'
BF	6	Michael Leitch (c)
RL	5	Wimpie van der Walt	(substituted off) 56'
LL	4	Luke Thompson
TP	3	Asaeli Ai Valu	(substituted off) 70'
HK	2	Shota Horie	(substituted off) 64'
LP	1	Keita Inagaki	(substituted off) 70'
Replacements:
HK	16	Atsushi Sakate	(substituted in) 64'
PR	17	Shogo Miura	(substituted in) 70'
PR	18	Yusuke Kizu	(substituted in) 70'
LK	19	Uwe Helu	(substituted in) 56'
FL	20	Kazuki Himeno	(substituted in) 64'
SH	21	Kaito Shigeno	(substituted in) 58'
FH	22	Rikiya Matsuda	(substituted in) 58'
WG	23	Kenki Fukuoka	(substituted in) 70'
Coach:
Jamie Joseph

FB	15	David Halaifonua
RW	14	Atieli Pakalani
OC	13	Siale Piutau (c)
IC	12	Cooper Vuna		(substituted off) 69'
LW	11	Nafi Tuitavake	(yellow card) 3' to 13'
FH	10	Latiume Fosita
SH	9	Sonatane Takulua		(substituted off) 64'
N8	8	Maama Vaipulu		(substituted off) 60'
OF	7	Fotu Lokotui
BF	6	Daniel Faleafa		(substituted off) 76'
RL	5	Leva Fifita
LL	4	Steve Mafi		(substituted off) 68'
TP	3	Maʻafu Fia		(substituted off) 48'
HK	2	Sosefo Sakalia		(substituted off) 55'
LP	1	Paea Faʻanunu		(substituted off) 40'
Replacements:
HK	16	Paul Ngauamo		(substituted in) 55'
PR	17	Toma Taufa		(substituted in) 40'
PR	18	Ben Tameifuna		(substituted in) 48'
N8	19	Sione Vailanu		(substituted in) 60'
LK	20	Onehunga Havili		(substituted in) 76'
FL	21	Zane Kapeli		(substituted in) 68'
SH	22	Leon Fukofuka		(substituted in) 64'
FH	23	James Faiva		(substituted in) 69'
Coach:
Toutai Kefu

Touch judges:
Luke Pearce (England)
Brendon Pickerill (New Zealand)
Television match official:
Glenn Newman (New Zealand)

=== Round 3 ===
9 August 2019
15:00 FJT (UTC+12)

Tonga	33–23	Canada
Try: Halaifonua 7' c Lolohea 29' c Hingano 33' m Talakai 41' c Vailanu 71' c Con: Takulua (3/3) 8', 31', 43'; Fosita (1/1) 73'	Report	Try: Hassler (2) 40' m Parfrey 64' m Van der Merwe 73' m Pen: McRorie (1/1) 17'

Churchill Park, Lautoka
Referee: Nigel Owens (Wales)

Team details

FB	15	David Halaifonua
RW	14	Atieli Pakalani
OC	13	Mali Hingano
IC	12	Siale Piutau (c)	(substituted off) 48'
LW	11	Viliami Lolohea
FH	10	James Faiva	(substituted off) 48'
SH	9	Sonatane Takulua	(substituted off) 57'
N8	8	Zane Kapeli
OF	7	Fotu Lokotui	(substituted off) 19'
BF	6	Steve Mafi
RL	5	Sam Lousi
LL	4	Leva Fifita
TP	3	Siua Halanukonuka	(substituted off) 40'
HK	2	Paul Ngauamo	(substituted off) 64'
LP	1	Paea Faʻanunu	(substituted off) 40'
Replacements:
HK	16	Elvis Taione	(substituted in) 64'
PR	17	Latu Talakai	(substituted in) 40'
PR	18	Ben Tameifuna	(substituted in) 40'
N8	19	Sione Vailanu	(substituted in) 19'
FL	20	Daniel Faleafa	(substituted in) 44'
SH	21	Leon Fukofuka	(substituted in) 57'
FH	22	Latiume Fosita	(substituted in) 48'
WG	23	Cooper Vuna	(substituted in) 48'
Coach:
Toutai Kefu

FB	15	Peter Nelson
RW	14	Jeff Hassler
OC	13	Ben LeSage
IC	12	Ciaran Hearn	(substituted off) 68'
LW	11	D. T. H. van der Merwe
FH	10	Gordon McRorie
SH	9	Phil Mack	(substituted off) 50'
N8	8	Tyler Ardron (c)
OF	7	Lucas Rumball
BF	6	Luke Campbell	(substituted off) 47'
RL	5	Evan Olmstead
LL	4	Mike Sheppard	(substituted off) 47'
TP	3	Matt Tierney	(substituted off) 52'
HK	2	Eric Howard	(substituted off) 20'
LP	1	Djustice Sears-Duru	(substituted off) 68'
Replacements:
HK	16	Benoît Piffero	(substituted in) 20'
PR	17	Hubert Buydens	(substituted in) 68'
PR	18	Cole Keith	(substituted in) 52'
LK	19	Conor Keys	(substituted in) 47'
FL	20	Matt Heaton	(substituted in) 47'
WG	21	Kainoa Lloyd
CE	22	Nick Blevins	(substituted in) 68'
FH	23	Pat Parfrey	(substituted in) 50'
Coach:
Kingsley Jones

Touch judges:
Ben O'Keeffe (New Zealand)
Tevita Rokovereni (Fiji)
In Goal Judges:
FRU Appt. (Fiji)
FRU Appt. (Fiji)

10 August 2019
16:35 FJT (UTC+12)

United States	20–34	Japan
Try: Hughes 16' c Germishuys 71' c Con: Hooley (2/2) 17', 72'; Pen: Hooley (2/2) 29', 40'	Report	Try: Leitch (2) 3' c, 55' c Fukuoka 11' c Yamanaka 42' c Con: Tamura (4/4) 4', 12', 43', 56'; Pen: Tamura (2/2) 9', 39'

ANZ National Stadium, Suva
Referee: Glen Jackson (New Zealand)

Team details

FB	15	Will Hooley
RW	14	Blaine Scully (c)
OC	13	Marcel Brache
IC	12	Paul Lasike
LW	11	Madison Hughes	(substituted off) 57'
FH	10	AJ MacGinty	(substituted off) 37'
SH	9	Shaun Davies	(substituted off) 54'
N8	8	Jamason Fa'anana Schultz
OF	7	Hanco Germishuys
BF	6	Malon Al-Jiboori	(substituted off) 57'
RL	5	Greg Peterson	(substituted off) 57'
LL	4	Nate Brakeley
TP	3	Paul Mullen	(substituted off) 59'
HK	2	Mike Sosene-Feagai	(substituted off) 65'
LP	1	Chance Wenglewski	(substituted off) 40'
Replacements:
HK	16	Dylan Fawsitt	(substituted in) 65'
PR	17	David Ainuu	(substituted in) 40'
PR	18	Paddy Ryan	(substituted in) 59'
LK	19	Ben Landry	(substituted in) 57'
FL	20	Ben Pinkelman	(substituted in) 57'
SH	21	Nate Augspurger	(substituted in) 54'
FH	22	Will Magie	(substituted in) 37'
CE	23	Thretton Palamo	(substituted in) 57'
Coach:
Gary Gold

FB	15	Ryohei Yamanaka	(substituted off) 57'
RW	14	Kotaro Matsushima
OC	13	Will Tupou
IC	12	Timothy Lafaele
LW	11	Kenki Fukuoka
FH	10	Yu Tamura	(substituted off) 64'
SH	9	Fumiaki Tanaka	(substituted off) 50'
N8	8	Hendrik Tui	(substituted off) 78'
OF	7	Lappies Labuschagné
BF	6	Michael Leitch (c)	(substituted off) 57'
RL	5	Uwe Helu	(substituted off) 50'
LL	4	James Moore
TP	3	Asaeli Ai Valu
HK	2	Shota Horie	(substituted off) 57'
LP	1	Keita Inagaki	(substituted off) 64'
Replacements:
HK	16	Atsushi Sakate	(substituted in) 57'
PR	17	Koki Yamamoto	(substituted in) 64'
PR	18	Yusuke Kizu	(substituted in) 78'
LK	19	Wimpie van der Walt	(substituted in) 50'
FL	20	Kazuki Himeno	(substituted in) 57'
SH	21	Yutaka Nagare	(substituted in) 50'
FH	22	Rikiya Matsuda	(substituted in) 64'
WG	23	Lomano Lemeki	(substituted in) 57'
Coach:
Jamie Joseph

Touch judges:
Ben O'Keeffe (New Zealand)
Tevita Rokovereni (Fiji)
In Goal Judges:
FRU Appt. (Fiji)
FRU Appt. (Fiji)

10 August 2019
19:15 FJT (UTC+12)

Fiji	10–3	Samoa
Try: Goneva 43' c Con: Volavola (1/1) 45'; Pen: Volavola (1/1) 32'	Report	Pen: Seuteni (1/3) 39'

ANZ National Stadium, Suva
Referee: Brendon Pickerill (New Zealand)

Team details

FB	15	Setariki Tuicuvu		(substituted off) 70'
RW	14	Vereniki Goneva
OC	13	Semi Radradra
IC	12	Levani Botia
LW	11	Patrick Osborne
FH	10	Ben Volavola		(substituted off) 77'
SH	9	Frank Lomani		(substituted off) 5'	(substituted in) 18'	(substituted off) 77'
N8	8	Viliame Mata		(substituted off) 57'
OF	7	Semi Kunatani
BF	6	Dominiko Waqaniburotu (c)
RL	5	Leone Nakarawa
LL	4	Tevita Cavubati		(substituted off) 62'
TP	3	Peni Ravai		(substituted off) 46'
HK	2	Sam Matavesi		(substituted off) 70'
LP	1	Campese Ma'afu		(substituted off) 46'
Replacements:
HK	16	Mesu Dolokoto		(substituted in) 70'
PR	17	Eroni Mawi		(substituted in) 46'
PR	18	Kalivati Tawake		(substituted in) 47'
LK	19	Tevita Ratuva		(substituted in) 62'
FL	20	Peceli Yato	(yellow card) 76' to 80'	(substituted in) 57'
SH	21	Nikola Matawalu		(substituted in) 5'	(substituted off) 18'	(substituted in) 77'
CE	22	Josh Matavesi		(substituted in) 77'
FB	23	Kini Murimurivalu		(substituted in) 70'
Coach:
John McKee

FB	15	Ahsee Tuala
RW	14	Alapati Leiua
OC	13	Kieron Fonotia
IC	12	Rey Lee-Lo
LW	11	Belgium Tuatagaloa
FH	10	UJ Seuteni	(substituted off) 65'
SH	9	Dwayne Polataivao
N8	8	TJ Ioane	(substituted off) 50'
OF	7	Jack Lam (c)
BF	6	Chris Vui
RL	5	Kane Leaupepe
LL	4	Filo Paulo
TP	3	Paul Alo-Emile	(substituted off) 67'
HK	2	Motu Matu'u	(substituted off) 52'
LP	1	Logovi'i Mulipola	(substituted off) 67'
Replacements:
HK	16	Ray Niuia	(substituted in) 52'
PR	17	Jordan Lay	(substituted in) 67'
PR	18	James Lay	(substituted in) 67'
LK	19	Senio Toleafoa
FL	20	Henry Stowers	(substituted in) 50'
SH	21	Pele Cowley
FH	22	AJ Alatimu	(substituted in) 65'
CE	23	Henry Taefu
Coach:
Steve Jackson

Touch judges:
Damon Murphy (Australia)
Jordan Way (Australia)
In Goal Judges:
FRU Appt. (Fiji)
FRU Appt. (Fiji)

== Statistics ==
=== Points scorers ===
Pos	Name	Team	Pts
1	Yu Tamura	Japan	39
2	AJ MacGinty	United States	28
3	Kenki Fukuoka	Japan	15
3	Kotaro Matsushima	Japan	15
5	Will Hooley	United States	10
6	UJ Seuteni	Samoa	11
6	Ben Volavola	Fiji	11
8	Jeff Hassler	Canada	10
8	Timothy Lafaele	Japan	10
8	Michael Leitch	Japan	10
8	Alapati Leiua	Samoa	10
8	Sam Matavesi	Fiji	10

=== Try scorers ===
Pos	Name	Team	Tries
1	Kenki Fukuoka	Japan	3
1	Kotaro Matsushima	Japan	3
3	Jeff Hassler	Canada	2
3	Timothy Lafaele	Japan	2
3	Michael Leitch	Japan	2
3	Alapati Leiua	Samoa	2
3	Sam Matavesi	Fiji	2
8	36 players with 1 try		

== Squads ==
Nation	Head coach	Captain
Canada	Kingsley Jones	Tyler Ardron
Fiji	John McKee	Dominiko Waqaniburotu
Japan	Jamie Joseph	Michael Leitch
Samoa	Steve Jackson	Various
Tonga	Toutai Kefu	Siale Piutau
United States	Gary Gold	Blaine Scully

Note: Number of caps and players' ages are indicated as of 27 July 2019 – the tournament's opening day, pre first tournament match.

=== Canada ===
On 18 July, Kingsley Jones named his 31-man squad for the Pacific Nations Cup.

On 1 August, winger Kainoa Lloyd was added to the squad as injury cover.

Note: Flags indicate national union for the club/province as defined by World Rugby.

Player	Position	Date of birth (age)	Caps	Club/province
Eric Howard	Hooker	5 September 1993 (aged 25)	20	(United States) New Orleans Gold
Benoît Piffero	Hooker	21 May 1987 (aged 32)	22	(France) Blagnac SCR
Andrew Quattrin	Hooker	29 August 1996 (aged 22)	0	(Canada) Toronto Arrows
Rob Brouwer	Prop	10 December 1982 (aged 36)	9	(Canada) Toronto Arrows
Hubert Buydens	Prop	4 January 1982 (aged 37)	52	(United States) New Orleans Gold
Jake Ilnicki	Prop	27 February 1992 (aged 27)	31	(United States) Seattle Seawolves
Cole Keith	Prop	7 May 1997 (aged 22)	12	(Canada) Toronto Arrows
Djustice Sears-Duru	Prop	24 May 1994 (aged 25)	46	(United States) Seattle Seawolves
Matt Tierney	Prop	4 July 1996 (aged 23)	17	(France) Castres Olympique
Conor Keys	Lock	2 August 1995 (aged 23)	13	Unattached
Evan Olmstead	Lock	21 February 1991 (aged 28)	27	Unattached
Mike Sheppard	Lock	20 December 1988 (aged 30)	5	(Canada) Toronto Arrows
Kyle Baillie	Flanker	7 April 1991 (aged 28)	25	(United States) New Orleans Gold
Justin Blanchet	Flanker	25 August 1993 (aged 25)	3	Unattached
Matt Heaton	Flanker	9 February 1993 (aged 26)	21	(England) Darlington Mowden Park
Lucas Rumball	Flanker	2 August 1995 (aged 23)	29	(Canada) Toronto Arrows
Tyler Ardron	Number 8	16 June 1991 (aged 28)	31	(New Zealand) Chiefs
Luke Campbell	Number 8	10 February 1992 (aged 27)	9	(Canada) Toronto Arrows
Jamie Mackenzie	Scrum-half	28 February 1989 (aged 30)	17	(Canada) Toronto Arrows
Phil Mack	Scrum-half	18 August 1985 (aged 33)	55	(United States) Seattle Seawolves
Gordon McRorie	Fly-half	12 May 1988 (aged 31)	39	(Canada) Prairie Wolf Pack
Shane O'Leary	Fly-half	3 December 1993 (aged 25)	10	(England) Nottingham
Pat Parfrey	Fly-half	1 November 1991 (aged 27)	27	(Canada) Toronto Arrows
Nick Blevins	Centre	11 November 1988 (aged 30)	59	(Canada) Prairie Wolf Pack
Ciaran Hearn	Centre	30 December 1985 (aged 33)	66	Unattached
Ben LeSage	Centre	24 November 1995 (aged 23)	12	(Canada) BC Bears
Conor Trainor	Centre	12 May 1989 (aged 30)	32	(France) USO Nevers
Jeff Hassler	Wing	21 August 1991 (aged 27)	21	(United States) Seattle Seawolves
Kainoa Lloyd	Wing	21 May 1994 (age 31)	10	(Canada) Toronto Arrows
Taylor Paris	Wing	6 October 1992 (aged 26)	27	(France) Castres Olympique
D. T. H. van der Merwe	Wing	28 April 1986 (aged 33)	55	(Scotland) Glasgow Warriors
Peter Nelson	Fullback	5 October 1992 (age 33)	0	Unattached

=== Fiji ===
On 30 May, John McKee named an initial 50-man extended squad for the upcoming Pacific Nations Cup which was cut down to 42 in June.

Player	Position	Date of birth (age)	Caps	Club/province
Mesu Dolokoto	Hooker	21 January 1995 (aged 24)	3	(Fiji) Fijian Latui
Sam Matavesi	Hooker	13 January 1992 (aged 27)	6	(England) Cornish Pirates
Tuvere Veremalua	Hooker	29 December 1997 (aged 21)	4	(Fiji) Fijian Latui
Lee Roy Atalifo	Prop	10 May 1988 (aged 31)	9	(England) Jersey Reds
Campese Ma'afu	Prop	19 December 1984 (aged 34)	56	Unattached
Eroni Mawi	Prop	2 June 1996 (aged 23)	5	(Fiji) Fijian Latui
Peni Ravai	Prop	16 June 1990 (aged 29)	24	(France) Bordeaux Bègles
Manasa Saulo	Prop	6 April 1989 (aged 30)	41	Unattached
Luke Tagi	Prop	23 June 1997 (aged 22)	0	(Fiji) Fijian Latui
Kalivati Tawake	Prop	16 November 1988 (aged 30)	10	(France) Biarritz
Joeli Veitayaki Jr.	Prop	14 March 1986 (aged 33)	7	(Fiji) Fijian Latui
Tevita Cavubati	Lock	12 August 1987 (aged 31)	22	(England) Harlequins
Leone Nakarawa	Lock	2 April 1988 (aged 31)	54	(France) Racing 92
Api Ratuniyarawa	Lock	11 July 1986 (aged 33)	30	(England) Northampton Saints
Tevita Ratuva	Lock	8 May 1995 (aged 24)	0	(France) Bordeaux Bègles
Albert Tuisue	Lock	6 June 1993 (aged 26)	4	(England) London Irish
Semi Kunatani	Flanker	27 October 1990 (aged 28)	6	(England) Harlequins
Viliame Mata	Flanker	22 October 1991 (aged 27)	9	(Scotland) Edinburgh
Mosese Voka	Flanker	7 June 1985 (aged 34)	8	(Fiji) Fijian Drua
Dominiko Waqaniburotu (c)	Flanker	20 April 1986 (aged 33)	44	(France) Pau
Peceli Yato	Flanker	17 January 1993 (aged 26)	13	(France) Clermont Auvergne
John Dyer	Number 8	6 February 1992 (aged 27)	0	(Fiji) Fijian Latui
Nemani Nagusa	Number 8	21 June 1988 (aged 31)	16	(England) Newcastle Falcons
Frank Lomani	Scrum-half	18 April 1996 (aged 23)	8	(Fiji) Fijian Drua
Nikola Matawalu	Scrum-half	8 March 1989 (aged 30)	33	(Scotland) Glasgow Warriors
Henry Seniloli	Scrum-half	15 June 1989 (aged 30)	24	(England) Doncaster Knights
Seru Vularika	Scrum-half	29 April 1990 (aged 29)	11	(Fiji) Fijian Latui
Alivereti Veitokani	Fly-half	2 November 1992 (aged 26)	5	(England) London Irish
Ben Volavola	Fly-half	13 January 1991 (aged 28)	28	(France) Racing 92
Levani Botia	Centre	14 March 1989 (aged 30)	11	(France) La Rochelle
Sevanaia Galala	Centre	29 January 1993 (aged 26)	2	(France) Brive
Josh Matavesi	Centre	5 October 1990 (aged 28)	17	(England) Newcastle Falcons
Waisea Nayacalevu	Centre	26 June 1990 (aged 29)	16	(France) Stade Français
Semi Radradra	Centre	13 June 1992 (aged 27)	3	(France) Bordeaux Bègles
Jale Vatubua	Centre	30 August 1991 (aged 27)	13	(France) Pau
Vereniki Goneva	Wing	5 April 1984 (aged 35)	54	(England) Newcastle Falcons
Filipo Nakosi	Wing	8 April 1992 (aged 27)	0	(France) Castres Olympique
Patrick Osborne	Wing	14 June 1987 (aged 32)	6	(Japan) Kubota Spears
Eroni Sau	Wing	2 May 1990 (aged 29)	2	(France) Perpignan
Josua Tuisova	Wing	4 February 1994 (aged 25)	7	(France) Toulon
Kini Murimurivalu	Fullback	15 May 1989 (aged 30)	24	(France) La Rochelle
Setariki Tuicuvu	Fullback	7 September 1995 (aged 23)	1	(France) Clermont Auvergne

=== Japan ===
On 17 July, Japan named a 35-man squad for their 2019 World Rugby Pacific Nations Cup campaign.

Player	Position	Date of birth (age)	Caps	Franchise/province
Kosuke Horikoshi	Hooker	2 June 1995 (aged 24)	2	(Japan) Suntory Sungoliath
Shota Horie	Hooker	21 January 1986 (aged 33)	58	(Japan) Sunwolves / Panasonic Wild Knights
Atsushi Sakate	Hooker	21 June 1993 (aged 26)	13	(Japan) Sunwolves / Panasonic Wild Knights
Keita Inagaki	Prop	2 June 1990 (aged 29)	25	(Japan) Sunwolves / Panasonic Wild Knights
Yusuke Kizu	Prop	2 December 1995 (aged 23)	0	(Japan) Toyota Verblitz
Shogo Miura	Prop	6 August 1995 (aged 23)	5	(Japan) Sunwolves / Toyota Verblitz
Asaeli Ai Valu	Prop	7 May 1989 (aged 30)	5	(Japan) Sunwolves / Panasonic Wild Knights
Luke Thompson	Lock	16 April 1981 (aged 38)	64	(Japan) Kintetsu Liners
Wimpie van der Walt	Lock	6 January 1989 (aged 30)	9	(Japan) NTT DoCoMo Red Hurricanes
Uwe Helu	Lock	12 July 1990 (aged 29)	11	(Japan) Sunwolves / Yamaha Júbilo
James Moore	Lock	11 June 1993 (aged 26)	0	(Japan) Sunwolves
Hendrik Tui	Loose forward	13 December 1987 (aged 31)	43	(Japan) Sunwolves
Yoshitaka Tokunaga	Loose forward	10 April 1992 (aged 27)	10	(Japan) Toshiba Brave Lupus
Shunsuke Nunomaki	Loose forward	13 July 1992 (aged 27)	7	(Japan) Sunwolves / Panasonic Wild Knights
Michael Leitch	Loose forward	7 October 1988 (aged 30)	59	(Japan) Sunwolves / Toshiba Brave Lupus
Lappies Labuschagné	Loose forward	11 January 1989 (aged 30)	0	(Japan) Sunwolves / Kubota Spears
Kazuki Himeno	Loose forward	27 July 1994 (aged 25)	9	(Japan) Sunwolves / Toyota Verblitz
Amanaki Mafi	Loose forward	21 January 1990 (aged 29)	22	(Japan) NTT Communications Shining Arcs
Kaito Shigeno	Scrum-half	21 November 1990 (aged 28)	7	(Japan) Sunwolves
Fumiaki Tanaka	Scrum-half	3 January 1985 (aged 34)	69	(Japan) Sunwolves / Panasonic Wild Knights
Yutaka Nagare	Scrum-half	4 September 1992 (aged 26)	15	(Japan) Sunwolves / Suntory Sungoliath
Yu Tamura	Fly-half	9 January 1989 (aged 30)	54	(Japan) Sunwolves
Rikiya Matsuda	Fly-half	9 January 1989 (aged 30)	16	(Japan) Panasonic Wild Knights
Will Tupou	Centre	20 July 1990 (aged 29)	6	(Japan) Coca-Cola Red Sparks
Ryoto Nakamura	Centre	3 June 1991 (aged 28)	16	(Japan) Suntory Sungoliath
Timothy Lafaele	Centre	19 August 1991 (aged 27)	14	(Japan) Sunwolves / Coca-Cola Red Sparks
Ryohei Yamanaka	Wing	22 June 1988 (aged 31)	12	(Japan) Sunwolves / Kobelco Steelers
Kenki Fukuoka	Wing	7 September 1992 (aged 26)	30	(Japan) Panasonic Wild Knights
Ataata Moeakiola	Wing	6 February 1996 (aged 23)	3	(New Zealand) Chiefs
Lomano Lemeki	Wing	30 January 1989 (aged 30)	8	(Japan) Honda Heat
Kotaro Matsushima	Fullback	26 February 1993 (aged 26)	30	(Japan) Sunwolves / Suntory Sungoliath

=== Samoa ===
On 22 June, Steve Jackson named a 33-man squad for the 2019 Pacific Nations Cup.

Note: Flags indicate national union for the club/province as defined by World Rugby.

Player	Position	Date of birth (age)	Caps	Club/province
Elia Elia	Hooker	22 January 1996 (aged 23)	6	(England) Harlequins
Seilala Lam	Hooker	18 February 1989 (aged 30)	10	(France) Perpignan
Motu Matu'u	Hooker	30 April 1987 (aged 32)	18	(England) London Irish
Ray Niuia	Hooker	14 October 1991 (aged 27)	2	(New Zealand) Highlanders
Paul Alo-Emile	Prop	22 December 1991 (aged 27)	10	(France) Stade Français
James Lay	Prop	16 December 1993 (aged 25)	9	(England) Bristol
Jordan Lay	Prop	5 November 1992 (aged 26)	11	(England) Bristol
Logovi'i Mulipola	Prop	11 March 1987 (aged 32)	26	(England) Newcastle
Alofaaga Sao	Prop	9 October 1997 (aged 21)	0	(Samoa) Savai'i Vikings
Hisa Sasagi	Prop	29 July 1987 (aged 31)	4	(New Zealand) Blues
Kane Leaupepe	Lock	3 December 1992 (aged 26)	3	(New Zealand) Hurricanes
Filo Paulo	Lock	6 November 1987 (aged 31)	30	Unattached
Senio Toleafoa	Lock	26 August 1993 (aged 25)	0	(France) Nevers
Chris Vui	Lock	11 February 1993 (aged 26)	12	(England) Bristol
Piula Fa'asalele	Flanker	22 January 1988 (aged 31)	17	(France) Perpignan
Faifili Levave	Flanker	15 January 1986 (aged 33)	19	Unattached
Tofatuimoana Solia	Flanker	21 January 1993 (aged 26)	0	(Samoa) Southern Tornadoes
Henry Stowers	Flanker	3 March 1995 (aged 24)	0	(Australia) Western Force
Afa Amosa	Number 8	11 October 1990 (aged 28)	0	(France) Bordeaux-Bègles
Jack Lam	Number 8	18 November 1987 (aged 31)	32	Unattached
Pele Cowley	Scrum-half	16 April 1993 (aged 26)	11	(New Zealand) Ponsonby RFC
Auvasa Faleali'i	Scrum-half	9 February 1990 (aged 29)	2	(France) Nevers
Dwayne Polataivao	Scrum-half	30 July 1990 (aged 28)	10	Unattached
AJ Alatimu	Fly-half	25 March 1993 (aged 26)	1	(Australia) Western Force
UJ Seuteni	Fly-half	9 December 1993 (aged 25)	0	(France) Bordeaux-Bègles
Kieron Fonotia	Centre	2 February 1988 (aged 31)	7	(Wales) Scarlets
Rey Lee-Lo	Centre	28 February 1986 (aged 33)	21	(Wales) Cardiff Blues
Alapati Leiua	Centre	21 September 1988 (aged 30)	24	(England) Bristol
Henry Taefu	Centre	2 April 1993 (aged 26)	2	(Australia) Western Force
Jamie-Jerry Taulagi	Wing	18 June 1993 (aged 26)	4	(France) Agen
Belgium Tuatagaloa	Wing	19 September 1989 (aged 29)	0	Unattached
Johnny Vaili	Wing	7 June 1995 (aged 24)	0	(Samoa) Aana Chiefs
Ahsee Tuala	Fullback	23 August 1989 (aged 29)	16	(England) Northampton

=== Tonga ===
Tonga squad for the 2019 World Rugby Pacific Nations Cup.

Note: Flags indicate national union for the club/province as defined by World Rugby.

Player	Position	Date of birth (age)	Caps	Club/province
Paul Ngauamo	Hooker	19 February 1990 (aged 29)	16	(France) Agen
Sosefo Sakalia	Hooker	14 December 1991 (aged 27)	7	(Singapore) Asia Pacific Dragons
Elvis Taione	Hooker	25 May 1983 (aged 36)	27	(England) Exeter Chiefs
Paea Faʻanunu	Prop	4 November 1988 (aged 30)	8	(France) Castres
Maʻafu Fia	Prop	22 November 1989 (aged 29)	1	(Wales) Ospreys
Siegfried Fisi'ihoi	Prop	8 June 1987 (aged 32)	7	(France) Stade Français
Siua Halanukonuka	Prop	9 August 1986 (aged 32)	8	(Scotland) Glasgow Warriors
Ben Tameifuna	Prop	30 August 1991 (aged 27)	7	(France) Racing 92
Toma Taufa	Prop	9 March 1995 (aged 24)	0	(France) Aviron Bayonnais
Leva Fifita	Lock	29 July 1989 (aged 29)	10	(France) Grenoble
Onehunga Havili	Lock	16 February 1996 (aged 23)	4	(England) Exeter Chiefs
Sam Lousi	Lock	20 July 1991 (aged 28)	0	(New Zealand) Hurricanes
Steve Mafi	Lock	9 December 1989 (aged 29)	29	(France) Castres
Daniel Faleafa	Flanker	13 February 1989 (aged 30)	17	(England) Coventry
Zane Kapeli	Flanker	28 September 1992 (aged 26)	1	(New Zealand) Bay of Plenty
Fotu Lokotui	Flanker	19 March 1992 (aged 27)	7	Kagifa Samoa
Maama Vaipulu	Flanker	21 July 1989 (aged 30)	4	(France) Castres
Nasi Manu	Number 8	15 August 1988 (aged 30)	3	(Italy) Benetton
Sione Vailanu	Number 8	27 January 1995 (aged 24)	4	(England) Saracens
Sami Fisilau	Half-back	29 November 1987 (aged 31)	18	(New Zealand) Auckland Marist
Leon Fukofuka	Half-back	8 September 1994 (aged 24)	2	Kagifa Samoa
Sonatane Takulua	Half-back	11 January 1991 (aged 28)	30	(England) Newcastle Falcons
James Faiva	First five-eighth	13 June 1994 (aged 25)	0	(Spain) El Salvador
Latiume Fosita	First five-eighth	25 July 1992 (aged 27)	27	Kagifa Samoa
Mali Hingano	Centre	27 January 1992 (aged 27)	0	(France) Stade Français
Otumaka Mausia	Centre	22 April 1997 (aged 22)	0	(New Zealand) Auckland
Siale Piutau	Centre	13 October 1985 (aged 33)	35	(England) Bristol Rugby
Nafi Tuitavake	Centre	21 January 1989 (aged 30)	11	(England) Northampton Saints
Viliami Lolohea	Wing	4 July 1993 (aged 26)	5	(New Zealand) Papatoetoe
Atieli Pakalani	Wing	2 August 1989 (aged 29)	6	(Australia) Eastwood
Cooper Vuna	Wing	5 July 1987 (aged 32)	8	(England) Bath
David Halaifonua	Fullback	5 July 1987 (aged 32)	28	(England) Coventry

=== United States ===
On the 13 June, Gary Gold named a 50-man extended squad for the Pacific Nations Cup, and in preparation ahead of the 2019 Rugby World Cup.

Player	Position	Date of birth (age)	Caps	Club/province
Dylan Fawsitt	Hooker	24 July 1990 (aged 29)	8	(United States) Rugby United New York
Mike Sosene-Feagai	Hooker	17 April 1993 (aged 26)	4	(New Zealand) Auckland
James Hilterbrand	Hooker	21 May 1989 (aged 30)	18	(Australia) Manly
Kapeli Pifeleti	Hooker	1 September 1999 (aged 19)	2	(United States) San Diego Legion
Joe Taufete'e	Hooker	4 October 1992 (aged 26)	22	(England) Worcester Warriors
David Ainuu	Prop	20 November 1999 (aged 19)	5	(France) Toulouse
Titi Lamositele	Prop	11 February 1995 (aged 24)	27	(England) Saracens
Paul Mullen	Prop	16 November 1991 (aged 27)	10	(United States) Houston SaberCats
Dino Waldren	Prop	11 July 1991 (aged 28)	19	(United States) San Diego Legion
Chance Wenglewski	Prop	9 April 1997 (aged 22)	3	(United States) Rugby ATL
Olive Kilifi	Prop	28 September 1986 (aged 32)	26	(United States) Seattle Seawolves
Paddy Ryan	Prop	11 December 1990 (aged 28)	4	(United States) Rugby United New York
Eric Fry	Prop	14 September 1987 (aged 31)	44	(France) RC Vannes
Nick Civetta	Lock	5 November 1989 (aged 29)	22	(England) Doncaster Knights
Nate Brakeley	Lock	31 August 1989 (aged 29)	18	(United States) Rugby United New York
Samu Manoa	Lock	5 March 1985 (aged 34)	22	(United States) Seattle Seawolves
Siaosi Mahoni	Lock	29 January 1997 (aged 22)	2	(United States) San Diego Legion
Louis Stanfill	Lock	30 May 1985 (aged 34)	56	(United States) San Diego Legion
Greg Peterson	Lock	26 March 1991 (aged 28)	20	(England) Newcastle Falcons
Ben Landry	Lock	26 March 1991 (aged 28)	18	(England) Ealing Trailfinders
Malon Al-Jiboori	Flanker	1 August 1994 (aged 24)	2	(United States) Glendale Raptors
Psalm Wooching	Flanker	16 January 1997 (aged 22)	4	(United States) San Diego Legion
Ben Pinkelman	Flanker	13 June 1994 (aged 25)	0	(United States) USA Sevens
Tony Lamborn	Flanker	31 July 1994 (aged 24)	18	(Australia) Melbourne Rebels
Hanco Germishuys	Flanker	24 August 1996 (aged 22)	15	(United States) Glendale Raptors
John Quill	Flanker	10 March 1990 (aged 29)	33	(United States) Rugby United New York
David Tameilau	Flanker	22 January 1990 (aged 29)	15	(Scotland) Glasgow Warriors
Cam Dolan	Number 8	7 March 1990 (aged 29)	44	(United States) New Orleans Gold
Ross Deacon	Number 8	29 October 1993 (aged 25)	0	(United States) Rugby United New York
Jamason Faʻanana-Schultz	Number 8	13 June 1996 (aged 23)	0	(United States) Houston Sabercats
Riekert Hattingh	Number 8	5 March 1994 (aged 25)	0	(United States) Seattle Seawolves
Nate Augspurger	Scrum-half	31 January 1990 (aged 29)	21	(United States) San Diego Legion
Shaun Davies	Scrum-half	20 June 1989 (aged 30)	22	(United States) Glendale Raptors
Ruben de Haas	Scrum-half	9 October 1998 (aged 20)	11	(South Africa) Cheetahs
Mike Petri	Scrum-half	16 August 1984 (aged 34)	57	(United States) Rugby United New York
Ben Cima	Fly-half	20 March 1996 (aged 23)	10	(United States) Seattle Seawolves
Will Hooley	Fly-half	28 October 1993 (aged 25)	8	(England) Bedford Blues
AJ MacGinty	Fly-half	26 February 1990 (aged 29)	21	(England) Sale Sharks
Will Magie	Fly-half	23 February 1992 (aged 27)	23	(United States) Glendale Raptors
Bryce Campbell	Centre	21 September 1994 (aged 24)	25	(England) London Irish
Paul Lasike	Centre	18 June 1990 (aged 29)	13	(England) Harlequins
Gannon Moore	Centre	1 June 1990 (aged 29)	3	(United States) Utah Warriors
Thretton Palamo	Centre	22 September 1988 (aged 30)	17	(United States) Houston Sabercats
Martin Iosefo	Centre	13 January 1990 (aged 29)	3	(United States) USA Sevens
Marcel Brache	Wing	15 October 1987 (aged 31)	16	(Australia) Western Force
Tim Maupin	Wing	23 March 1989 (aged 30)	9	(United States) New Orleans Gold
Ryan Matyas	Wing	24 December 1990 (aged 28)	12	(United States) San Diego Legion
Madison Hughes	Wing	26 October 1992 (aged 26)	3	(United States) USA Sevens
Mike Te'o	Fullback	23 July 1993 (aged 26)	23	(United States) San Diego Legion
Blaine Scully	Fullback	29 February 1988 (aged 31)	46	(Wales) Cardiff Blues

== See also ==
- 2019 Rugby World Cup warm-up matches
