= 2017 World Rugby Pacific Nations Cup =

International rugby union tournament edition

Tournament details
- Countries: Fiji; Samoa; Tonga
- Tournament format(s): Round-robin
- Date: 1–15 July 2017

Tournament statistics
- Teams: 3
- Matches played: 3
- Attendance: 26,500 (8,833 per match)
- Tries scored: 13 (4.33 per match)
- Top point scorer(s): (Tonga) Sonatane Takulua (25)
- Top try scorer(s): (Fiji) Henry Seniloli (3)

Final
- Champions: Fiji (4th title)
- Runners-up: Tonga

The 2017 World Rugby Pacific Nations Cup was the twelfth edition of the Pacific Nations Cup annual international rugby union tournament. The 2017 title was contested solely by the Pacific nations of Fiji, Samoa and Tonga.

Teams competing in previous years, Canada, Japan and the United States were not scheduled to participate in the tournament for 2017 or 2016 due to the 2019 Rugby World Cup qualifying format. The top two teams on aggregate across the 2016 and 2017 Pacific Nations Cups for Japan 2019, with the team finishing third scheduled to enter the repechage for qualification.

Having not hosted a test match since playing Fiji in June 2009, Tonga was given the go-ahead to host a test match with World Rugby's approval of the revamped Teufaiva Sport Stadium.

Fiji retained their title to win for the third consecutive year.

== Table ==
Pos	Team	Pld	W	D	L	PF	PA	PD	TF	TA	TB	LB	Pts
1	Fiji	2	2	0	0	52	26	+26	6	2	1	0	9
2	Tonga	2	1	0	1	40	40	0	4	3	0	1	5
3	Samoa	2	0	0	2	42	68	−26	3	8	0	1	1

Rules for classification: 4 points for a win, 2 points for a draw, 1 bonus point for a loss by seven points or less, 1 bonus point for scoring four or more tries in a match

== Fixtures ==
The full match schedule was announced on 23 March 2017.

=== Round 1 ===
1 July 2017
15:00 TOT (UTC+13)

Tonga	30–26	Samoa
Try: Latu 13' c Pakalani 17' c Takulua 47' c Con: Takulua (3/3) 14', 19', 49'; Pen: Takulua (3/3) 12', 33', 42'	Report	Try: Levave 30' c Leiua 65' c Con: Pisi (2/2) 30', 66'; Pen: Pisi (4/4) 8', 21', 35', 44'

Teufaiva Sport Stadium, Nukuʻalofa
Attendance: 10,000
Referee: Marius Mitrea (Italy)

FB	15	Atieli Pakalani
RW	14	David Halaifonua
OC	13	Nafi Tuitavake
IC	12	Siale Piutau (c)
LW	11	Cooper Vuna	(substituted off) 69'
FH	10	Latiume Fosita
SH	9	Sonatane Takulua
N8	8	Valentino Mapapalangi	(substituted off) 40'
OF	7	Nili Latu
BF	6	Daniel Faleafa
RL	5	Steve Mafi	(substituted off) 66'
LL	4	Leva Fifita
TP	3	Siua Halanukonuka	(substituted off) 61'
HK	2	Paul Ngauamo
LP	1	Siegfried Fisiihoi
Replacements:
HK	16	Suliasi Taufalele
PR	17	Latu Talakai
PR	18	Ben Tameifuna	(substituted on) 61'
FL	19	Jack Ram	(substituted on) 66'
FL	20	Michael Faleafa	(substituted on) 40'
SH	21	Leon Fukofuka
FH	22	Kali Hala
CE	23	Tevita Taufuʻi	(substituted on) 69'
Coach:
(Australia) Toutai Kefu

FB	15	Tim Nanai-Williams
RW	14	Alapati Leiua
OC	13	Kieron Fonotia	(substituted off) 77'
IC	12	Rey Lee-Lo
LW	11	David Lemi (c)
FH	10	Tusi Pisi	(substituted off) 66'
SH	9	Kahn Fotuali'i	(substituted off) 74'
N8	8	Faifili Levave
OF	7	Galu Taufale
BF	6	Piula Faʻasalele
RL	5	Fa'atiga Lemalu	(substituted off) 61'
LL	4	Chris Vui
TP	3	Paul Alo-Emile
HK	2	Manu Leiataua	(substituted off) 79'
LP	1	Nephi Leatigaga	(substituted off) 56'
Replacements:
HK	16	Elia Elia	(substituted on) 79'
PR	17	Jordan Lay	(substituted on) 56'
PR	18	James Lay
LK	19	Masalosalo Tutaia	(substituted on) 61'
FL	20	Taiasina Tuifu'a
SH	21	Auvasa Faleali'i	(substituted on) 74'
FH	22	D'Angelo Leuila	(substituted on) 66'
CE	23	Henry Taefu	(substituted on) 77'
Coach:
(New Zealand) Alama Ieremia

Touch judges:
Nick Briant (New Zealand)
Paul Williams (New Zealand)

Notes:

- This was Tonga's first home game since they played Fiji in 2009.
- This was Tonga's first win over Samoa since they won 29–19 in 2011.
- Siegfried Fisiihoi, Atieli Pakalani (both Tonga), Auvasa Faleali'i, Jordan Lay, Henry Taefu and Masalosalo Tutaia (all Samoa) made their international debuts.
- David Lemi (Samoa) earned his 50th test cap.

=== Round 2 ===
8 July 2017
15:00 TOT (UTC+13)

Tonga	10–14	Fiji
Try: Fisiihoi 46' c Con: Takulua (1/1) 47'; Pen: Takulua (1/2) 25'	Report	Try: Nakarawa 53' m Pen: Volavola (3/3) 14', 65', 72'

Teufaiva Sport Stadium, Nukuʻalofa
Attendance: 10,000
Referee: Nick Briant (New Zealand)

FB	15	Atieli Pakalani
RW	14	David Halaifonua	(substituted off) 77'
OC	13	Siale Piutau (c)
IC	12	Tevita Taufuʻi
LW	11	Cooper Vuna	(substituted off) 77'
FH	10	Latiume Fosita
SH	9	Sonatane Takulua
N8	8	Valentino Mapapalangi	(substituted off) 72'
OF	7	Jack Ram				(substituted off) 55'
BF	6	Daniel Faleafa	(substituted off) 3'	(substituted on) 11'	42' to 55'
RL	5	Steve Mafi
LL	4	Leva Fifita
TP	3	Siua Halanukonuka	(substituted off) 55'
HK	2	Paul Ngauamo	(substituted off) 72'
LP	1	Siegfried Fisiihoi	(substituted off) 62'
Replacements:
HK	16	Suliasi Taufalele	(substituted on) 72'
PR	17	Latu Talakai	(substituted on) 62'
PR	18	Ben Tameifuna	(substituted on) 55'
FL	19	Sione Tau	(substituted on) 72'
FL	20	Michael Faleafa	(substituted on) 3'	(substituted off) 11'	(substituted on) 42'
SH	21	Leon Fukofuka
FH	22	Kali Hala	(substituted on) 77'
WG	23	Kiti Taimani Vaini	(substituted on) 77'
Coach:
(Australia) Toutai Kefu

FB	15	Timoci Nagusa
RW	14	Josua Tuisova	(substituted off) 76'
OC	13	Asaeli Tikoirotuma	(substituted off) 61'
IC	12	Jale Vatubua
LW	11	Patrick Osborne
FH	10	Ben Volavola
SH	9	Serupepeli Vularika	(substituted off) 34'
N8	8	Nemani Nagusa
OF	7	Akapusi Qera (c)
BF	6	Dominiko Waqaniburotu	(substituted off) 61'
RL	5	Leone Nakarawa
LL	4	Tevita Cavubati	(substituted off) 61'
TP	3	Manasa Saulo	(substituted off) 51'
HK	2	Sunia Koto	(substituted off) 40'
LP	1	Campese Ma'afu	(substituted off) 51'	(substituted on) 77'
Replacements:
HK	16	Talemaitoga Tuapati	(substituted on) 40'
PR	17	Peni Ravai	(substituted on) 51'	(substituted off) 77'
PR	18	Kalivati Tawake	(substituted on) 51'
LK	19	Api Ratuniyarawa	(substituted on) 61'
FL	20	Viliame Mata	(substituted on) 61'
SH	21	Henry Seniloli	(substituted on) 34'
CE	22	Vereniki Goneva	(substituted on) 61'
WG	23	Benito Masilevu	(substituted on) 76'
Coach:
(New Zealand) John McKee

Touch judges:
Paul Williams (New Zealand)
Marius Mitrea (Italy)

Notes:

- Sione Tau (Tonga) made his international debut.
- With this Result Fiji guaranteed qualification for the Rugby World Cup 2019 as Oceana 1.

=== Round 3 ===
15 July 2017
14:00 WST (UTC+13)

Samoa	16–38	Fiji
Try: Lemi 20' c Con: Pisi (1/1) 21'; Pen: Pisi (3/6) 27', 33', 37'	Report	Try: Seniloli (3) 10' c, 23' c, 42' c Vatubua 53' c Ratuniyarawa 75' c Con: Volavola (5/5) 11', 24', 43', 54', 76'; Pen: Volavola (1/1) 62'

Apia Park, Apia
Attendance: 6,500
Referee: Paul Williams (New Zealand)

FB	15	Tim Nanai-Williams
RW	14	Alapati Leiua
OC	13	Kieron Fonotia	(substituted off) 64'
IC	12	Rey Lee-Lo
LW	11	David Lemi (c)	(substituted off) 73'
FH	10	Tusi Pisi
SH	9	Kahn Fotuali'i	(substituted off) 76'
N8	8	Faifili Levave	(substituted off) 57'
OF	7	Jack Lam
BF	6	Piula Faʻasalele	(substituted off) 67'
RL	5	Fa'atiga Lemalu
LL	4	Chris Vui
TP	3	Paul Alo-Emile	(substituted off) 51'
HK	2	Elia Elia	(substituted off) 58'
LP	1	Jordan Lay	(substituted off) 76'
Replacements:
HK	16	Seilala Lam	(substituted on) 58'
PR	17	Nephi Leatigaga	(substituted on) 76'
PR	18	James Lay	(substituted on) 51'
FL	19	Galu Taufale	(substituted on) 67'
N8	20	Sanele Vavae Tuilagi	(substituted on) 57'
SH	21	Auvasa Faleali'i	(substituted on) 76'
FH	22	D'Angelo Leuila	(substituted on) 64'
FB	23	Ahsee Tuala	(substituted on) 73'
Coach:
(New Zealand) Alama Ieremia

FB	15	Timoci Nagusa	(substituted off) 60'
RW	14	Vereniki Goneva
OC	13	Asaeli Tikoirotuma	(substituted off) 74'
IC	12	Jale Vatubua
LW	11	Patrick Osborne
FH	10	Ben Volavola
SH	9	Henry Seniloli	(substituted off) 76'
N8	8	Nemani Nagusa
OF	7	Akapusi Qera (c)	(substituted off) 66'
BF	6	Dominiko Waqaniburotu
RL	5	Leone Nakarawa
LL	4	Tevita Cavubati	(substituted off) 59'
TP	3	Manasa Saulo	(substituted off) 60'
HK	2	Talemaitoga Tuapati	(substituted off) 66'
LP	1	Campese Ma'afu	(substituted off) 66'
Replacements:
HK	16	Sunia Koto	(substituted on) 66'
PR	17	Joeli Veitayaki Jr.	(substituted on) 66'
PR	18	Kalivati Tawake	(substituted on) 60'
LK	19	Api Ratuniyarawa	(substituted on) 59'
FL	20	Viliame Mata	(substituted on) 66'
SH	21	Frank Lomani	(substituted on) 76'
CE	22	Eroni Vasiteri	(substituted on) 74'
WG	23	Josua Tuisova	(substituted on) 60'
Coach:
(New Zealand) John McKee

Touch judges:
Marius Mitrea (Italy)
Nick Briant (New Zealand)

Notes:

- James Lay (Samoa) and Frank Lomani (Fiji) made their international debuts.
- This was Fiji's first win in Samoa since their 17–16 win in 2002.

== Squads ==
Nation	Head coach	Captain
Fiji	(New Zealand) John McKee	Akapusi Qera
Samoa	(New Zealand) Alama Ieremia	David Lemi
Tonga	(Australia) Toutai Kefu	Siale Piutau

Note: Number of caps and players' ages are indicated as of 1 July 2017 – the tournament's opening day, pre first tournament match.

=== Fiji ===
On 9 May, John McKee named an extended squad ahead of Fiji's 2017 June tests against Australia, Italy and Scotland and their Rugby Pacific Nations Cup / 2019 RWC Oceania qualification campaign in July.

Player	Position	Date of birth (age)	Caps	Club/province
Sunia Koto	Hooker	April 15, 1980 (aged 37)	54	(France) Mâcon
Jale Sassen	Hooker	September 6, 1992 (aged 24)	1	(Fiji) Suva
Talemaitoga Tuapati	Hooker	August 16, 1985 (aged 31)	36	(France) Provence
Lee Roy Atalifo	Prop	March 10, 1988 (aged 29)	9	Unattached
Mosese Ducivaki	Prop	February 28, 1991 (aged 26)	1	(Fiji) Naitasiri
Campese Ma'afu	Prop	December 19, 1984 (aged 32)	45	(England) Northampton Saints
Peni Ravai	Prop	June 16, 1990 (aged 27)	21	(France) Aurillac
Manasa Saulo	Prop	April 6, 1989 (aged 28)	31	(France) Toulon
Kalivati Tawake	Prop	November 16, 1988 (aged 28)	3	(Fiji) Suva
Joeli Veitayaki Jr.	Prop	March 14, 1986 (aged 31)	5	(Fiji) Naitasiri Highlanders
Leone Nakarawa	Lock	April 2, 1988 (aged 29)	42	(France) Racing 92
Tevita Cavubati	Lock	August 12, 1987 (aged 29)	18	(England) Worcester Warriors
Api Ratuniyarawa	Lock	July 11, 1986 (aged 30)	24	(England) Northampton Saints
Sikeli Nabou	Lock	March 5, 1988 (aged 29)	1	(France) Biarritz Olympique
Naulia Dawai	Flanker	June 26, 1987 (aged 30)	8	(Republic of Ireland) Connacht
Viliame Mata	Flanker	October 22, 1991 (aged 25)	2	(Scotland) Edinburgh
Akapusi Qera (c)	Flanker	April 24, 1984 (aged 33)	57	(France) Montpellier
Mosese Voka	Flanker	June 7, 1985 (aged 32)	4	(Fiji) Suva
Dominiko Waqaniburotu	Flanker	April 20, 1986 (aged 31)	33	(France) Brive
Peceli Yato	Flanker	January 17, 1993 (aged 24)	9	(France) Clermont Auvergne
Nemani Nagusa	Number 8	June 21, 1988 (aged 29)	8	(Fiji) Nadroga
Nikola Matawalu	Scrum-half	March 8, 1989 (aged 28)	32	(England) Exeter Chiefs
Henry Seniloli	Scrum-half	June 15, 1989 (aged 28)	14	(Romania) Timișoara Saracens
Serupepeli Vularika	Scrum-half	April 29, 1990 (aged 27)	8	(Fiji) Suva
Ben Volavola	Fly-half	January 13, 1991 (aged 26)	17	(Australia) Melbourne Rebels
Levani Botia	Centre	March 14, 1989 (aged 28)	8	(France) La Rochelle
Vereniki Goneva	Centre	April 5, 1984 (aged 33)	44	(England) Newcastle Falcons
John Stewart	Centre	February 17, 1988 (aged 29)	1	(Fiji) Suva
Asaeli Tikoirotuma	Centre	June 24, 1986 (aged 31)	19	(England) London Irish
Jale Vatubua	Centre	August 30, 1991 (aged 25)	3	(France) Pau
Eroni Vasiteri	Centre	May 27, 1989 (aged 28)	3	(Fiji) Nadroga
Albert Vulivuli	Centre	May 26, 1985 (aged 32)	16	(France) Racing 92
Benito Masilevu	Wing	October 7, 1989 (aged 27)	8	(France) Brive
Nemani Nadolo	Wing	January 31, 1988 (aged 29)	26	(France) Montpellier
Timoci Nagusa	Wing	July 14, 1987 (aged 29)	26	(France) Montpellier
Patrick Osborne	Wing	June 14, 1987 (aged 30)	4	(New Zealand) Highlanders
Josua Tuisova	Wing	February 4, 1994 (aged 23)	1	(France) Toulon
Kini Murimurivalu	Fullback	May 15, 1989 (aged 28)	18	(France) La Rochelle
Metuisela Talebula	Fullback	May 24, 1991 (aged 26)	22	(France) Bordeaux Bègles

=== Samoa ===
On 29 May, Alama Ieremia named a 35-man squad ahead of Samoa's 2017 June tests against New Zealand and Wales and their Pacific Nations Cup / 2019 RWC Oceania qualification campaign in July.

Player	Position	Date of birth (age)	Caps	Club/province
Elia Elia	Hooker	January 22, 1996 (aged 21)	3	(England) Harlequins
Seilala Lam	Hooker	February 18, 1989 (aged 28)	5	(France) Nevers
Manu Leiataua	Hooker	December 26, 1986 (aged 30)	15	(France) Bayonne
Viliamu Afatia	Prop	May 24, 1990 (aged 27)	17	(France) Racing 92
Paul Alo-Emile	Prop	December 22, 1991 (aged 25)	2	(France) Stade Français
Census Johnston	Prop	May 6, 1981 (aged 36)	57	(France) Toulouse
James Lay	Prop	December 16, 1993 (aged 23)	0	(New Zealand) Whakarewarewa
Jordan Lay	Prop	November 5, 1992 (aged 24)	0	(New Zealand) Whakarewarewa
Nephi Leatigaga	Prop	December 5, 1993 (aged 23)	3	(Italy) Piacenza
Hisa Sasagi	Prop	June 29, 1987 (aged 30)	1	(New Zealand) Southern RFC
Bronson Tauakipulu	Prop	January 8, 1996 (aged 21)	1	(New Zealand) Northshore
Fa'atiga Lemalu	Lock	April 17, 1989 (aged 28)	20	(England) Saracens
Masalosalo Tutaia	Lock	June 5, 1984 (aged 33)	0	(France) Pau
Chris Vui	Lock	February 11, 1993 (aged 24)	3	(England) Worcester Warriors
Piula Faʻasalele	Flanker	January 22, 1988 (aged 29)	7	(France) Toulouse
Alafoti Fa'osiliva	Flanker	October 28, 1985 (aged 31)	23	(England) Worcester Warriors
Jack Lam	Flanker	November 18, 1987 (aged 29)	21	(England) Bristol
Faifili Levave	Flanker	January 15, 1986 (aged 31)	14	(Japan) Mitsubishi Sagamihara DynaBoars
Kelly Meafua	Flanker	October 16, 1990 (aged 26)	0	(Australia) West Harbour
Fa'alemiga Selesele	Flanker	February 28, 1989 (aged 28)	5	(Samoa) Moataa
Galu Taufale	Flanker	March 17, 1987 (aged 30)	1	(New Zealand) Poneke
Taiasina Tuifu'a	Flanker	August 20, 1984 (aged 32)	19	(France) Lyon
Sanele Vavae Tuilagi	Number 8	June 15, 1988 (aged 29)	8	(France) Carcassonne
Auvasa Faleali'i	Scrum-half	February 9, 1990 (aged 27)	0	(France) Nevers
Kahn Fotuali'i	Scrum-half	May 22, 1982 (aged 35)	33	(England) Bath
Dwayne Polataivao	Scrum-half	July 30, 1990 (aged 26)	3	(New Zealand) Northcote RFC
D'Angelo Leuila	Fly-half	January 18, 1997 (aged 20)	6	(New Zealand) Papatoetoe RFC
Tila Mealoi	Fly-half	June 28, 1991 (aged 26)	1	(Samoa) Apia Maroons
Tusi Pisi	Fly-half	June 18, 1982 (aged 35)	28	(England) Bristol
Kieron Fonotia	Centre	February 2, 1988 (aged 29)	2	(Wales) Ospreys
Rey Lee-Lo	Centre	February 20, 1986 (aged 31)	12	(Wales) Cardiff Blues
Alapati Leiua	Centre	September 21, 1988 (aged 28)	13	(England) Wasps
Henry Taefu	Centre	April 2, 1993 (aged 24)	0	(Australia) Queensland Reds
David Lemi (c)	Wing	February 10, 1982 (aged 35)	49	(England) Bristol
Tim Nanai-Williams	Wing	June 12, 1989 (aged 28)	6	(New Zealand) Chiefs
Ken Pisi	Wing	February 24, 1989 (aged 28)	13	(England) Northampton Saints
Albert Nikoro	Fullback	August 7, 1992 (aged 24)	6	(Australia) West Scarborough
Ahsee Tuala	Fullback	August 23, 1989 (aged 27)	6	(England) Northampton Saints

=== Tonga ===
On 9 June, Tonga named a 35-man extended squad for their 2017 June test against Wales and their Pacific Nations Cup / 2019 RWC Oceania qualification campaign in July.

Player	Position	Date of birth (age)	Caps	Club/province
Sione Lea	Hooker	12 January 1987 (aged 30)	3	(New Zealand) Clifton
Paul Ngauamo	Hooker	19 February 1990 (aged 27)	10	(France) Stade Montois
Suliasi Taufalele	Hooker	12 August 1988 (aged 28)	4	(New Zealand) Ardmore Marist
Siegfried Fisiihoi	Prop	8 June 1987 (aged 30)	0	(New Zealand) Chiefs
Siua Halanukonuka	Prop	9 August 1986 (aged 30)	4	(New Zealand) Highlanders
Phil Kite	Prop	24 April 1993 (aged 24)	1	(Australia) Queensland Reds
Sila Puafisi	Prop	15 April 1988 (aged 29)	27	(Scotland) Glasgow Warriors
Latu Talakai	Prop	26 December 1989 (aged 27)	1	(New Zealand) Fraser Tech
Ben Tameifuna	Prop	30 August 1991 (aged 25)	1	(France) Racing 92
Daniel Faleafa	Lock	13 February 1989 (aged 28)	11	(France) Albi
Leva Fifita	Lock	29 July 1989 (aged 27)	1	(New Zealand) Hamilton Old Boys
Steve Mafi	Lock	9 December 1989 (aged 27)	21	(France) Castres Olympique
Vainanuma Manu	Lock	1 August 1992 (aged 24)	0	(Tonga) Marist
Harrison Mataele	Lock		0	(New Zealand) Grammar TEC
Michael Faleafa	Flanker	3 February 1992 (aged 25)	1	(New Zealand) Hikurangi
Nili Latu	Flanker	19 February 1982 (aged 35)	53	(England) Newcastle Falcons
Sione Lolohea	Flanker		0	(Tonga) Silapelu’ua
Otenili Moala	Flanker		0	(New Zealand) Hamilton Old Boys
Jack Ram	Flanker	14 January 1987 (aged 30)	11	(England) Doncaster Knights
Sione Tau	Flanker	21 February 1989 (aged 28)	0	(France) Agen
Valentino Mapapalangi	Number 8	13 July 1993 (aged 23)	4	(New Zealand) Kia Toa
Leon Fukofuka	Scrum-half	8 September 1994 (aged 22)	1	(New Zealand) Crusaders
Sefo Ma'ake	Scrum-half	15 September 1991 (aged 25)	1	(Tonga) Havelu Bulldogs
Sonatane Takulua	Scrum-half	11 January 1991 (aged 26)	21	(England) Newcastle Falcons
Latiume Fosita	Fly-half	25 July 1992 (aged 24)	22	(New Zealand) Papatoetoe
Kali Hala	Fly-half	6 March 1991 (aged 26)	6	(New Zealand) Karaka
Siale Piutau (c)	Centre	13 October 1985 (aged 31)	28	(England) Bristol
Viliami Tahituʻa	Centre	10 September 1992 (aged 24)	4	(Japan) Yamaha Júbilo
Tevita Taufuʻi	Centre	21 March 1988 (aged 29)	1	(New Zealand) Melville
Tuihakavalu Ika	Wing	12 May 1995 (aged 22)	0	(Tonga) Toloa Old Boys
Atieli Pakalani	Wing	2 August 1989 (aged 27)	0	(Australia) Southern Districts
Nafi Tuitavake	Wing	21 January 1989 (aged 28)	5	(England) Northampton Saints
Kiti Taimani Vaini	Wing		1	(New Zealand) Grammar TEC
Cooper Vuna	Wing	5 July 1987 (aged 29)	2	(England) Worcester Warriors
David Halaifonua	Fullback	5 July 1987 (aged 29)	22	(England) Gloucester
