= Matavesi =

Matavesi is a surname. Notable people with the surname include:

- Josh Matavesi (born 1990), Cornish rugby union player
- Sam Matavesi (born 1992), Fijian rugby union player
