= Alofaaga Sao =

- Full name: Alofaaga Junior Sao
- Born: 9 October 1997 (age 29)
- Height: 5 ft 11 in (180 cm)
- Weight: 271 lb (123 kg)

Rugby union career
- Position: Prop
International career
Years	Team	Apps	(Points)
2019–	Samoa	2	(0)

Alofaaga Junior Sao (born 9 October 1997) is a Samoan international rugby union player.

A prop, Sao grew up in Sa'asa'ai and Saipipi on the island of Savaiʻi, where he used to weight train by lifting 32 coconuts bundled together. He was educated at LDS Church College in Vaiola.

Sao was called up by Samoa from the Savai'i Vikings in 2019 for the Pacific Nations Cup, the youngest member of the squad at 21-years of age. He made his debut in a win over Tonga at Apia Park.

== See also ==
- List of Samoa national rugby union players
