= Alamanda Motuga =

Samoan rugby union player

- Full name: Alamanda Lolo Motuga
- Born: 11 September 1994 (age 32) Auckland, New Zealand
- Height: 1.88 m (6 ft 2 in)
- Weight: 111 kg (245 lb; 17 st 7 lb)
- School: Manurewa High School

Rugby union career
- Position: Flanker
- Current team: Counties Manukau, Moana Pasifika
Senior career
Years	Team	Apps	(Points)
2020–	Counties Manukau	10	(30)
2022–	Moana Pasifika	17	(15)
- Correct as of 28 August 2023
International career
Years	Team	Apps	(Points)
2019–	Samoa	5	(10)
- Correct as of 28 August 2023
National sevens team
Years	Team		Comps
2016–	Samoa		37
- Correct as of 28 August 2023

Alamanda Lolo Motuga (born 11 September 1994) is a professional rugby union player who played as a flanker for Super Rugby club Moana Pasifika. Born in New Zealand, he represents Samoa at international level after qualifying on ancestry grounds.

== Early life ==
Motuga was educated at Manurewa High School in Auckland, New Zealand. He began playing rugby for Manurewa in the Counties-Manukau Amateur Federation Championship. He also played rugby sevens with the Auckland Marist team.

== Club career ==
In 2020 he joined the Counties Manukau squad for the 2020 Mitre 10 Cup. In November 2020 he represented Moana Pasifika in their inaugural match against the Māori All Blacks. In October 2021 he signed to Moana Pacifica for the 2022 season.

In June 2025 he was released from Moana Pasifikia. He was subsequently named to the Manukau Steelers squad.

== International career ==
In February 2016 he was selected for the Samoa national rugby sevens team to play in the Las Vegas and Vancouver legs of the 2015–16 World Rugby Sevens Series. In May 2016 he was part of the Samoan team that won the 2016 Paris Sevens. He went on to represent Samoa in 36 sevens competitions from 2016.

In July 2019 he was selected for the Samoa national rugby union team for the 2019 World Rugby Pacific Nations Cup, making his debut for the national side against Tonga. His performances for Samoa and Samoa Sevens earned him a call-up to the Samoa squad for the 2019 Rugby World Cup as a replacement for Afa Amosa.

He competed for Samoa at the 2024 Summer Olympics in Paris.

In November 2026 he was named to the manu Samoa team for the Nations Cup.
