= Fautua Otto =

Samoan rugby union player (born 1985)

Tua Otto
- Full name: Fautua Otto
- Born: 23 July 1985 (age 41) Sa'asa'ai, Western Samoa
- Height: 6 ft 1 in (185 cm)
- Weight: 198 lb (90 kg)

Rugby union career
- Position: Centre / Wing
Senior career
Years	Team	Apps	(Points)
2011–14	Bristol Bears		
2015–16	Jersey Reds		
International career
Years	Team	Apps	(Points)
2010–14	Samoa	12	(15)

Fautua Otto (born 23 July 1985) is a Samoan former international rugby union player.

Born in Sa'asa'ai, Otto was a centre and winger, capped 12 times for Samoa between 2010 and 2014. He scored a try against England at Twickenham in 2010 and also represented Samoa in rugby sevens, including matches in their 2009–10 IRB Sevens World Series title-winning campaign.

Otto had several years in England's RFU Championship. He competed for Bristol between 2011 and 2014, scoring 13 tries, then continued his career at the Jersey Reds in 2015. His contract was terminated by Jersey in 2016 after he was convicted of driving while disqualified and jailed for five months.

== See also ==
- List of Samoa national rugby union players
