= Phil Kite =

Phil Kite may refer to:

- Phil Kite (footballer) (born 1962), English football goalkeeper of the 1980s and 1990s
- Phil Kite (rugby union) (born 1993), Tonga rugby union international prop
