= Galu Taufale =

- Born: 17 March 1987 (age 39)
- Height: 6 ft 2 in (188 cm)
- Weight: 235 lb (107 kg)
- School: Newlands College

Rugby union career
- Position: Back-row
Provincial / State sides
Years	Team	Apps	(Points)
2016–19	Wellington	31	(25)
International career
Years	Team	Apps	(Points)
2017	Samoa	3	(0)

Galu Taufale (born 17 March 1987) is a Samoan former international rugby union player.

Taufale was born in Samoa and moved to New Zealand as a one-year old. He grew up in Wellington's northern suburbs and attended Newlands College. A Johnsonville junior product, Taufale briefly played senior rugby for the club after finishing school, then had four seasons with the Wests Roosters.

A long-time Poneke player, Taufale broke into the Wellington provincial side in 2016 at the late age of 29 and was captain during their 2017 campaign which ended with a Mitre 10 Cup title. He won a Samoa call up for their 2017 mid-year internationals, debuting as an openside flanker in a home Test against Wales, then playing twice at the Pacific Nations Cup, against Tonga in Nuku'alofa and Fiji in Apia.

== See also ==
- List of Samoa national rugby union players
