= Belgium Tuatagaloa =

Samoan rugby union player (born 1989)

- Born: 19 September 1989 (age 37) Auckland, New Zealand
- Height: 182 cm (6 ft 0 in)
- Weight: 115 kg (254 lb; 18 st 2 lb)
- School: Māngere College

Rugby union career
- Position: Wing, centres, 2nd 5/8 (rugby union)
Senior career
Years	Team	Apps	(Points)
2013	Canterbury	5	(20)
2014	Wellington	8	(10)
2016–2019	Valence Romans	40	(110)
2019–2020	London Irish	10	(15)
2020–	Rouen		
- Correct as of 10 August 2019
International career
Years	Team	Apps	(Points)
2019–	Samoa	7	(10)
- Correct as of 14 September 2019
National sevens teams
Years	Team		Comps
2012–2013	New Zealand		9
2015–2018	Samoa		17
- Correct as of 10 August 2019

Belgium Tuatagaloa (born 19 September 1989) is a rugby union player who has represented the New Zealand Sevens team, in 2012 and 2013, and Samoa in sevens 2015-2017 and in fifteens from 2019. Born in Auckland, New Zealand, he qualifies for Samoa through heritage. He has played for Canterbury in the ITM Cup and for Valence Romans Rugby in France's Fédérale 1, the third division. He currently plays for Rouen in the Pro D2. He has also played for London Irish and in 2022 played for Racing 92 in the Supersevens Tournament where he was named in the tournament team.

Initially a promising New Zealand boxer, Tuatagaloa fell into rugby in his late teens (2007) and the athletically strong runner impressed with his quick grasp of the game. He play 1st XV Rugby at Mangere College along with Ofa Tuʻungafasi. He was spotted by Sir Gordon Tietjens, the celebrated coach of the New Zealand men's national team in rugby sevens, the All Blacks Sevens.

He quickly rose through the NZ development system and in 2012 his form saw him make his debut for the New Zealand Sevens team. For two years 2012 and 2013 he became a regular feature on the IRB World Rugby Sevens Circuit. During this time the All Black Sevens team was the winner of the IRB Sevens World Series in 2012 and 2013.

As a result of his good handling and defensive skills combined with his speed and elusiveness, Tuatagaloa also gained a contract with provincial powerhouse Canterbury in 2013 where he was also drafted into Crusaders Squad for the 2013 season. Tuatagaloa made his provincial debut for Canterbury in 2013. Unfortunately, a broken leg bought a sudden end to his relationship with Canterbury and the Crusaders Squad.

Once recovered from injury the Olympic rules allowed Tuatagaloa to switch to the Samoan national sevens team to play in the 2015 through to 2018 seasons which included a memorable IRB Tournament win in Paris 2016.

He played in France for Valence Romans Rugby (French Fédérale 1) and was the leading try scorer in this competition with 18 tries in the 2018–19 season. He predominantly plays on the wing (left and right), but also plays inside-centre, outside-centre and fullback.

Due to fears over his availability during the 2019 Rugby World Cup his contract was not renewed for following season.

In December 2019 it was confirmed he had signed with Premiership Rugby side London Irish for the remainder of the season.

He later signed with Pro D2 outfit Rouen in France for the 2020–21 season.

He is currently now coaching at Glenwood High School, and as of now he's the 1st XV head coach replacing Justin Hollis who will coach at Stanford Lake College in Haenertsberg, Limpopo
