= Miles Craigwell =

US rugby sevens player (born 1986)

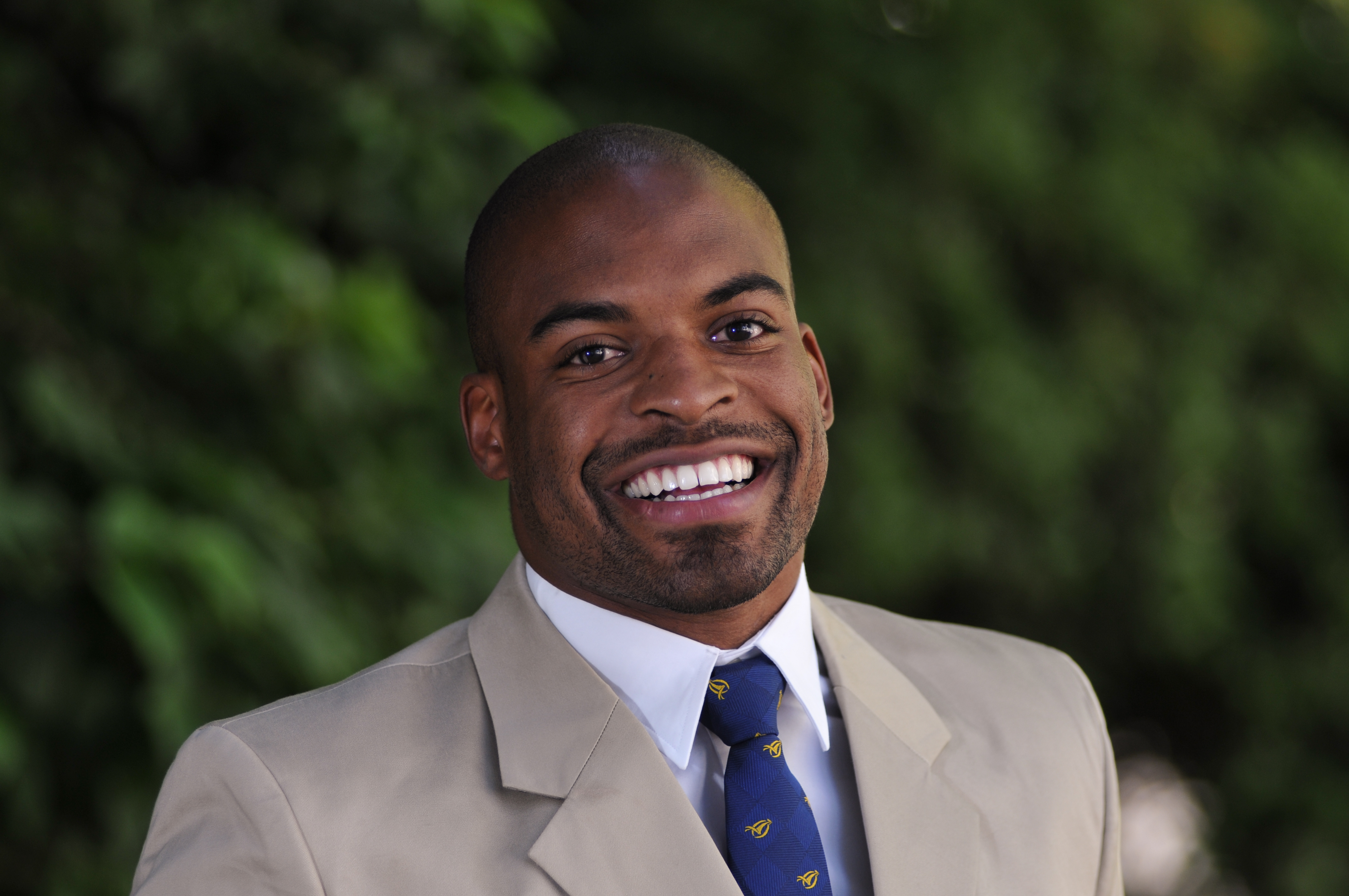
- Craigwell in 2011
- Born: March 24, 1986 (age 40) Boston, Massachusetts, U.S.
- Height: 6 ft 2 in (1.88 m)
- Weight: 215 lb (98 kg)

Rugby union career
- Position: Wing
Senior career
Years	Team	Apps	(Points)
2011	New York		
2012	Seattle		
National sevens team
Years	Team		Comps
2011–2014	United States		8

Miles Craigwell (born March 24, 1986) is a former international sevens rugby player and college football player. He played for the United States sevens team on the World Series circuit and at club level he played with the New York Athletic Club RFC and with the Seattle Saracens.

== American Football ==
In college, Craigwell played safety (and some wide receiver) with the Brown University football team. He received All-Ivy League Football Honorable Mention for the 2008 season. Craigwell graduated from Brown University in 2009 with a B.A. in Business Economics.

After college, Craigwell went on to the NFL, where he was signed as an undrafted free agent by the Miami Dolphins as a safety. However, he was relegated to the practice squad by the Miami Dolphins in May 2010, and was left to contemplate his future.

== Rugby Union ==
Craigwell's journey to rugby began in June 2010. He was eating in a diner, and saw the Collegiate Rugby Championship on NBC. Craigwell admired the pace of the game and the athleticism of the players, and decided he wanted to play rugby. Craigwell began playing rugby in July 2010, having never played rugby a day in his life. Craigwell was a fast learner, and by August 2010 Craigwell was playing in the USA Rugby Men's 7s All-Star Championships. By the end of 2010, Craigwell was playing for the national team in the IRB Sevens World Series.

Former U.S. head coach Al Caravelli has remarked on Craigwell's abilities: "He is very powerful and his defensive ability is scary. He hits so hard, he is very explosive."

== Combine ==
Pre-draft measurables
Height	Weight	40-yard dash	Vertical jump	Broad jump
6 ft 1 in (1.85 m)	215 lb (98 kg)	4.46 s	39 in (0.99 m)	10 ft 11 in (3.33 m)
