= Kazuki Himeno =

Japan international rugby union player

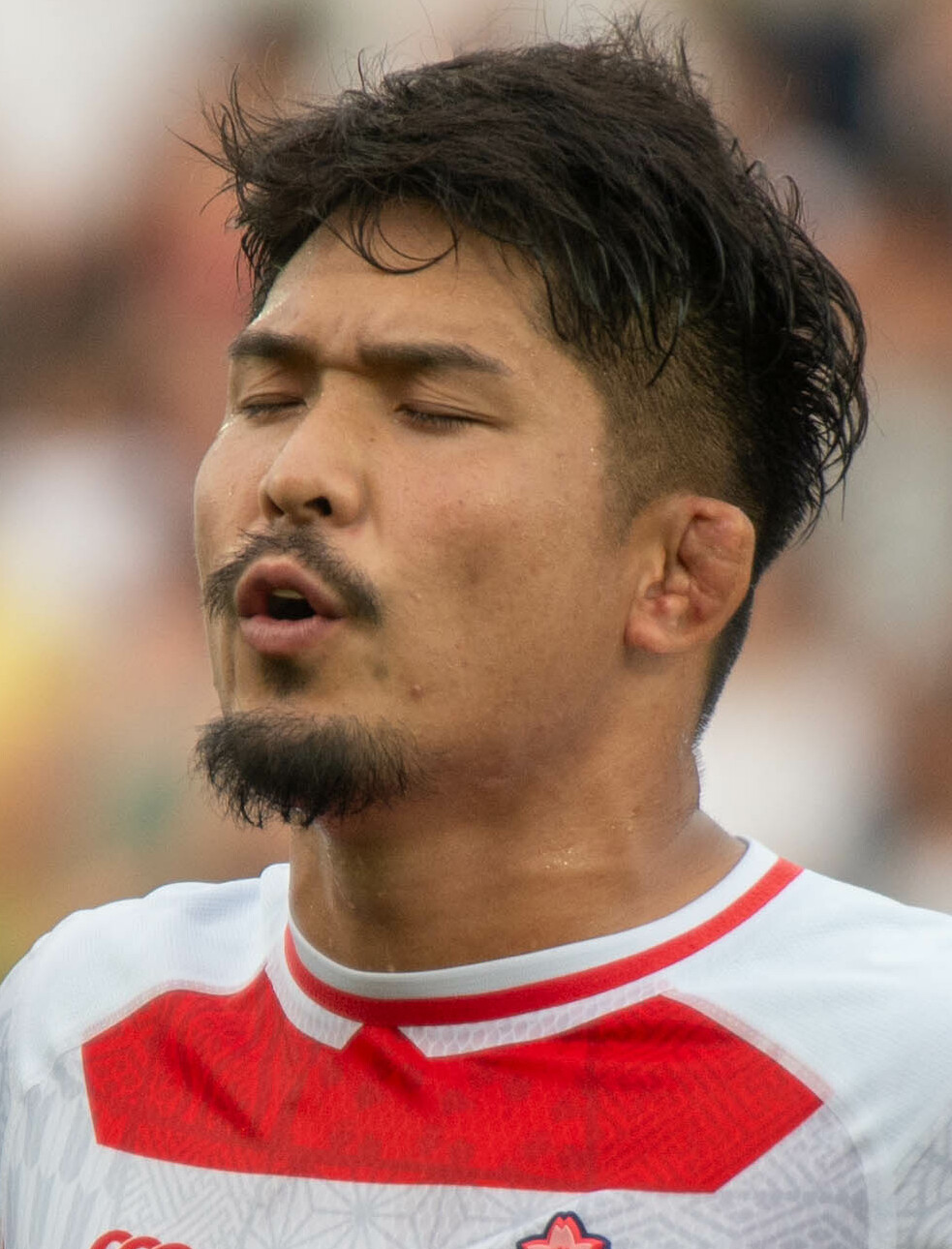
- Himeno with Japan in 2023
- Born: 27 July 1994 (age 32) Nagoya, Aichi, Japan
- Height: 1.87 m (6 ft 2 in)
- Weight: 108 kg (238 lb; 17 st 0 lb)
- University: Teikyo University

Rugby union career
- Position(s): Number 8, Flanker, Lock
- Current team: Toyota Verblitz
Senior career
Years	Team	Apps	(Points)
2017–	Toyota Verblitz	94	(140)
2018	Sunwolves	11	(10)
2021	Highlanders	11	(10)
- Correct as of 28 August 2023
International career
Years	Team	Apps	(Points)
2013	Japan U20	4	(0)
2017–	Japan	36	(35)
2023	Japan XV	1	(0)
- Correct as of 28 August 2023

Kazuki Himeno (姫野 和樹, Himeno Kazuki; born 27 July 1994) is a Japanese professional rugby union player who plays as a number eight for Japan Rugby League One club Toyota Verblitz and captains the Japan national team.

Praised for attributes including physical ball carrying, defensive work and leadership abilities, Himeno represented the Brave Blossoms at the 2019 Rugby World Cup and has been highlighted as one of Japan's key players ahead of the 2023 edition in France.

== Club career ==
Himeno experienced a rapid rise within the Japanese club game in 2017. Having emerged as a leading performer for Teikyo University, he was selected to captain Toyota Verblitz by coach Jake White.

Himeno joined Super Rugby side The Highlanders ahead of the 2021 Super Rugby season, after previous success at the franchise for compatriot Fumiaki Tanaka. His debut was delayed by a two-week quarantine period upon arrival in New Zealand, but quickly established himself as a key player in the team. According to Honey Hireme of Sky, Himeno rapidly became a fan favourite in Dunedin based on "his work-rate around the field, barn-storming runs with ball in hand, and punishing defence". He was named as the Rookie of the Year for the Super Rugby Aotearoa phase of the season and remained integral as The Highlanders reached the final of Super Rugby Trans-Tasman, but were beaten 23-15 by the Blues at Eden Park.

Himeno reflected on his time in New Zealand as crucial for his player development ahead of the 2023 Rugby World Cup, describing how "My body got sharper and I have more mobility. I've changed my training method and my body fat percentage has decreased. It's great to have learnt how to play the No. 7 position. It'll be a valuable option for the team too."

== International career ==
After only 9 Top League appearances for Toyota Verblitz, which included 8 starts, Himeno received his first call-up to Japan's senior squad ahead of the 2017 end-of-year rugby union internationals. He made his debut against Australia in November 2017, scoring a try and impressing in defence as his side were defeated 63–30.

Himeno impressed as part of the host nation's side at the 2019 Rugby World Cup. Across the tournament he was the only player to gain more than 200 metres and won four penalties at the breakdown, a tournament high. His defence was vital as Japan won a crucial 19–12 victory against Ireland at Shizuoka Stadium, winning a breakdown penalty on the Japanese line with 15 minutes remaining.

== Career statistics ==
=== List of international tries ===
Number	Position	Points	Tries	Result	Opposition	Venue	Date	Ref.
1	Lock	5	1	Lost	Australia	Nissan Stadium	4 November 2017	
2	Number 8	5	1	Won	Georgia	Toyota Stadium	23 June 2018	
3	Flanker	5	1	Won	Fiji	Kamaishi Recovery Memorial Stadium	27 July 2019	
4	Number 8	5	1	Won	Samoa	Toyota Stadium	5 October 2019	
5	Flanker	5	1	Lost	British & Irish Lions	Murrayfield Stadium	26 June 2021	
6	Flanker	5	1	Won	Portugal	Estádio Cidade	13 November 2021	
7	Flanker	5	1	Lost	New Zealand	National Stadium	29 October 2022	

as of 4 August 2023
