= Juan Rombys =

Uruguayan rugby union player

- Full name: Juan Pedro Rombys Aguzzi
- Born: 5 March 1987 (age 39) Paysandu, Uruguay
- Height: 188 cm (6 ft 2 in)
- Weight: 117 kg (258 lb)

Rugby union career
- Position: Prop
- Current team: Trébol de Paysandú
Senior career
Years	Team	Apps	(Points)
- Trébol de Paysandú
- Correct as of 25 September 2019
International career
Years	Team	Apps	(Points)
2008–present	Uruguay	31	(0)
- Correct as of 25 September 2019

Juan Pedro Rombys Aguzzi (born 5 March 1987) is a Uruguayan rugby union player who generally plays as a prop and has represented Uruguay internationally since 2008. He was included in the Uruguayan squad for the 2019 Rugby World Cup in Japan (the first time the tournament was held in Japan and indeed Asia). This tournament also marked his first World Cup appearance for Uruguay.

== Career ==
He made his international debut for Uruguay against Argentina on 31 May 2008. He has subsequently made several starting appearances and was substituted into Uruguay's famous victory against Fiji on 25 September 2019. Quite remarkably, in 2012 he gave up the sport and continued working in agriculture, only returning to the sport during the 2018 season. This successful comeback highlights a theme in the Uruguay team, who have in the past been accurately described as "amateur players" and who must often maintain jobs alongside the sport.
