= Yusuke Kizu =

Japanese rugby union player

- Born: 2 December 1995 (age 30) Oita Prefecture, Japan
- Height: 1.78 m (5 ft 10 in)
- Weight: 113 kg (17 st 11 lb; 249 lb)

Rugby union career
- Position: Prop
- Current team: Toyota Verblitz
Senior career
Years	Team	Apps	(Points)
2018–present	Toyota Verblitz	62	(15)
- Correct as of 21 February 2021
International career
Years	Team	Apps	(Points)
2019–	Japan	6	(0)
- Correct as of 21 February 2021

Yusuke Kizu (born 2 December 1995) is a Japanese rugby union player who generally plays as a prop. He represents Japan internationally and plays for Toyota Verblitz in the Japanese Top League. He was included in the Japanese squad for the 2019 Rugby World Cup, which was held in Japan for the first time and for the first time in Asia.

== Career ==
Yusuke made his club debut for Toyota Verblitz in 2018. He made his international debut for Japan against Fiji on 27 July 2019 at the 2019 World Rugby Pacific Nations Cup round match, where Japan defeated Fiji 34-21, and went on to win the tournament for the third time.
