= Glenwood High School =

Glenwood High School may refer to:

in Australia

- Glenwood High School (Australia), Glenwood, NSW, Australia

in Scotland

- Glenwood High School, Glenrothes, Glenrothes, Fife, Scotland

in South Africa

- Glenwood High School (Durban), Durban, South Africa
- Glenwood High School (Pretoria), Pretoria, South Africa

in the United States

(by state)

- Glenwood High School (Alabama), Phenix City, Alabama
- Glenwood High School (Arkansas), Glenwood, Arkansas
- Glenwood High School (Georgia), Glenwood, Georgia
- Glenwood High School (Illinois), Chatham, Illinois
- Glenwood High School (Iowa), Glenwood, Iowa
- Glenwood High School (Ohio), New Boston, Ohio
