= Filipo Nakosi =

Fiji international rugby union player (born 1992)

- Born: Filipo Nakosi; 8 April 1992 (age 34)
- Height: 6 ft (183 cm)
- Weight: 15 st 6 lb (216 lb; 98 kg)
- Notable relative: Josua Tuisova (brother)

Rugby union career
- Position: Wing
- Current team: Castres Olympique
Senior career
Years	Team	Apps	(Points)
2014–2015	Northland	11	(5)
2015–2018	Agen	49	(90)
2018–2019	Toulon	18	(50)
2019–	Castres	86	(110)
- Correct as of 23 January 2024
International career
Years	Team	Apps	(Points)
2019	Fiji	3	((0))
- Correct as of 25 September 2019

Filipo Nakosi (born 8 April 1992) is a Fijian rugby player for Castres Olympique in France's Top 14, the highest level of French rugby. His primary position is wing. His brother Josua Tuisova is also a Fiji international player.

== Career ==
Nakosi began his career in his native Fiji playing for Nadi in the Skipper Cup, he then joined amateur club Awanui in New Zealand's Northland Rugby Union. His performances saw him make the Northland Mitre 10 Cup team playing in 11 games before moving on to a fully professional contract with SU Agen in France, as a medical joker (injury replacement) for Canadian wing Taylor Paris.

His impressive performances saw Agen make him a permanent signing at the end of the season with a two-year contract. However, in November 2016 it was announced Nakosi had signed for Toulon to join his brother Josua Tuisova, before allowing him to remain at Agen for a further season on loan.

After playing only one season for Toulon Nakosi moved on again to Castres Olympique in the summer of 2019.

In August 2019 he was named in Fiji's squad for the 2019 Rugby World Cup.
