= Suliasi Taufalele =

- Born: Suliasi Fakalolo Taufalele; 12 August 1988 (age 38) Tokoroa, New Zealand
- Height: 1.83 m (6 ft 0 in)
- Weight: 113 kg (17 st 11 lb)
- School: Saint Kentigern College

Rugby union career
- Position: Hooker
- Current team: Ardmore Marist
Senior career
Years	Team	Apps	(Points)
	Ardmore Marist	200	
Provincial / State sides
Years	Team	Apps	(Points)
2011–	Counties Manukau	28	(5)
- Correct as of 23 October 2016
International career
Years	Team	Apps	(Points)
2013–	Tonga	5	(0)

Suliasi Taufalele (born 12 August 1988) is a Tongan rugby player His regular playing position is hooker. He represents the Tonga national rugby union team. He has played in the Chiefs development side and was also a member of the Counties Manukau Steelers side that won the championship in the 2012 ITM Cup. He was also selected for the Steelers' squad for the 2013 ITM Cup season. He plays club rugby for Ardmore Marist.
