= Pio Tuwai =

Fijian rugby union player

- Born: August 26, 1983 (age 43) Nabukavesi
- Height: 1.95 m (6 ft 5 in)
- Weight: 108 kg (238 lb; 17 st 0 lb)

Rugby union career
National sevens team
| Years | Team | Comps |
- Fiji 7s

Pio Tuwai is a Fiji rugby union player. He currently plays for the Fiji sevens team.

Tuwai played for the Sri Lankan Army in 2014. He returned to the Fiji sevens team in 2015 and played at the Hong Kong Sevens.
