= Phil Kite (rugby union) =

Tonga international rugby union player

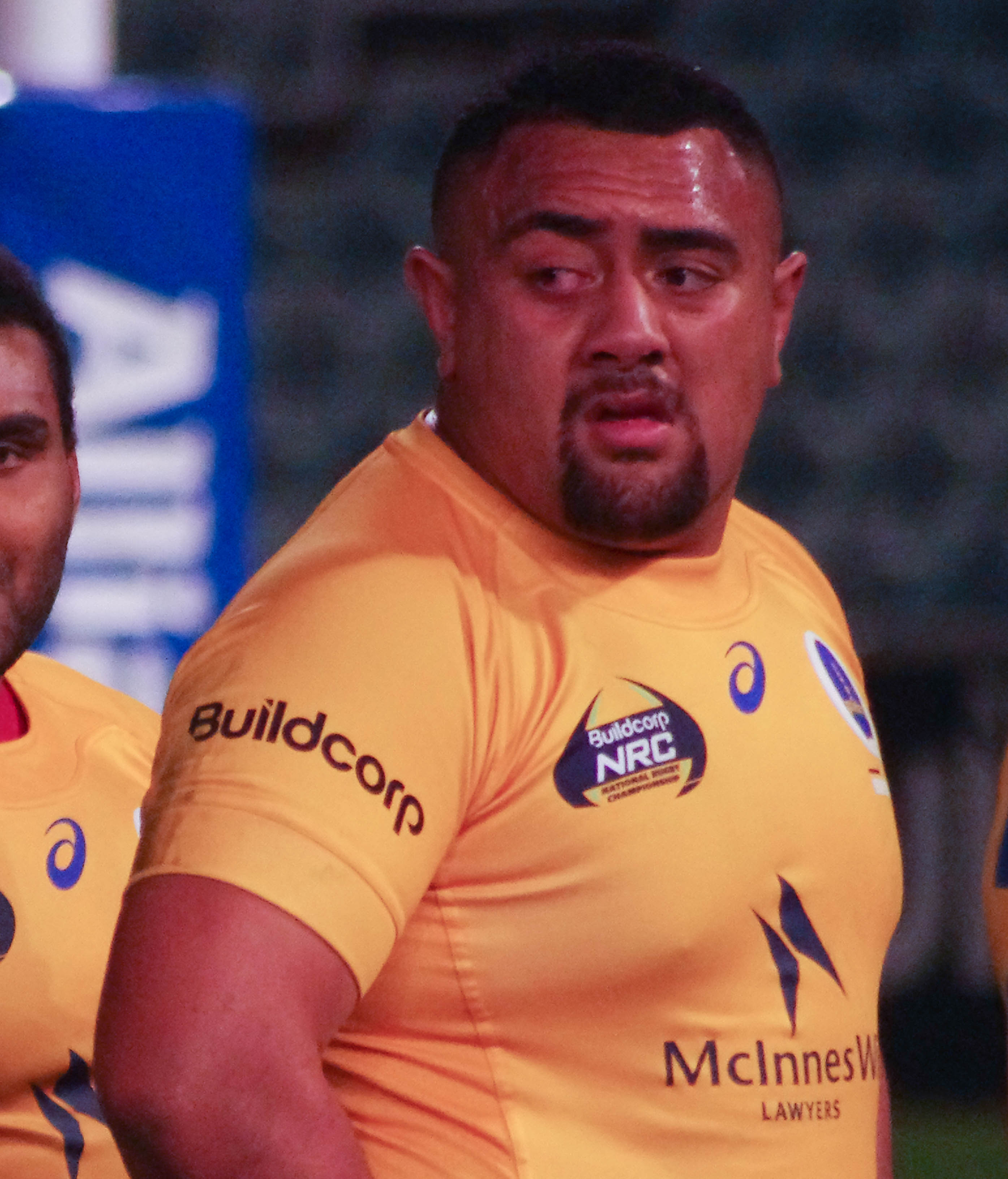
- Full name: Philip Kite
- Born: 24 April 1993 (age 33) Auckland, New Zealand
- Height: 6 ft 1 in (185 cm)
- Weight: 319 lb (145 kg)
- School: St Joseph's College, Nudgee

Rugby union career
- Position: Prop
Senior career
Years	Team	Apps	(Points)
2017–	RC Vannes		
Super Rugby
Years	Team	Apps	(Points)
2017	Queensland Reds		
International career
Years	Team	Apps	(Points)
2017–	Tonga	2	(0)

Philip Kite (born 24 April 1993) is a Tongan rugby union player.

== Biography ==
Born in Auckland, Kite attended St Joseph's College in the Brisbane suburb of Nudgee and was an Australian Under-20s representative at the 2013 IRB Junior World Championship.

Kite, a prop, was in the Brisbane City side that won the 2014 National Rugby Championship, after which he played rugby in Canberra with the Tuggeranong Vikings. He left for New Zealand in 2016 to play at Northland.

In 2017, Kite made a single Super Rugby appearances for Queensland Reds and gained a Test cap with the Tonga national team against Wales in Auckland, as a second-half substitute for Latu Talakai.

Kite has played in France with Pro D2 club Rugby Club Vannes since the 2017/18 season.

In 2022, Kite was capped again for Tonga in a win over Spain.

== See also ==
- List of Tonga national rugby union players
