= Josua Tuisova =

Fijian rugby union player (born 1994)

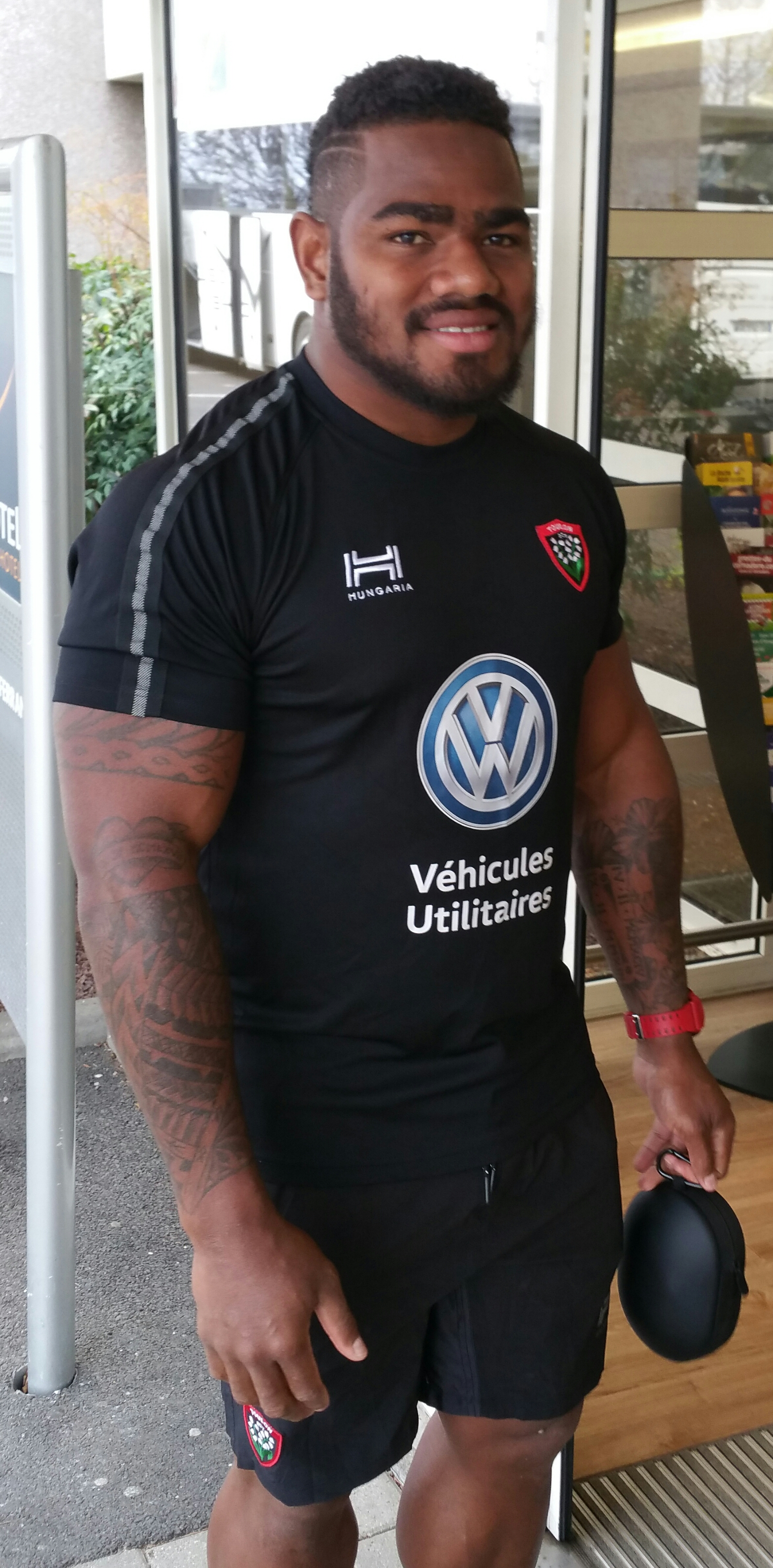
- Tuisova in April 2017
- Full name: Josua Tuisova Ratulevu
- Born: 4 February 1994 (age 32) Votua, Ba, Fiji
- Height: 1.81 m (5 ft 11 in)
- Weight: 113 kg (17 st 11 lb; 249 lb)
- School: John Wesley College
- Notable relative(s): Pio Tuwai (brother); Filipo Nakosi (half-brother)

Rugby union career
- Position(s): Wing, Centre, Number 8
- Current team: Racing 92
Senior career
Years	Team	Apps	(Points)
2013–2019	Toulon	122	(285)
2019–2023	Lyon	72	(130)
2023–	Racing 92	38	(35)
- Correct as of 19 October 2025
International career
Years	Team	Apps	(Points)
2017–	Fiji	35	(40)
- Correct as of 1 October 2022
National sevens team
Years	Team		Comps
2013–	Fiji		
Medal record
Men's rugby sevens
Representing Fiji
Olympic Games
Gold medal – first place	2016 Rio de Janeiro	Team competition

Josua Tuisova Ratulevu (born 4 February 1994) is a Fijian rugby union player. A wing or centre, he currently plays for Racing 92 in France's Top 14. He won a gold medal in sevens as part of the Fiji team at the 2016 Rio Olympics. Known for his strong running and physical play, he is nicknamed "Human Bulldozer" and "The Bus".

== Career ==
He began his career in Fiji, playing sevens for Westfield Barbarians, captained by his older brother and ex-Fiji sevens player, Pio Tuwai. He made his international sevens debut for Fiji in the 2013 Wellington Sevens against Scotland at rover.

In July 2013, he was signed by French Top 14 club RC Toulonnais (Toulon). He made his debut against Racing Métro 92 in August, and scored his first try against Bayonne. In May 2015, he signed a four-year deal to stay at Toulon.

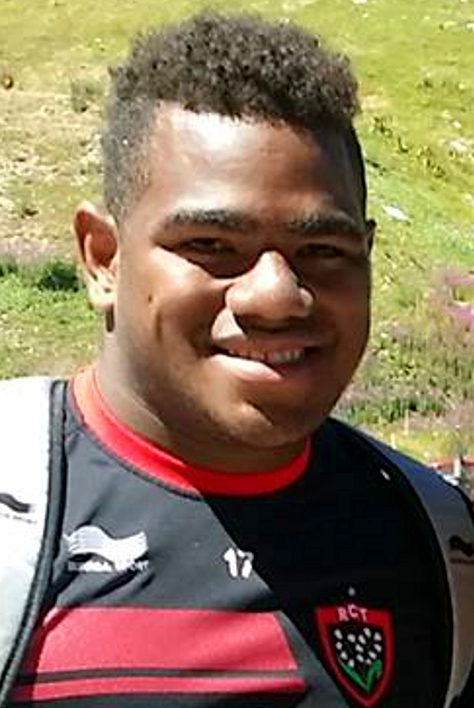
Josua Tuisova in 2015

He was included in Fiji's squad for the 2023 World Cup in France. He played on in the tournament until Fiji's exit in the quarterfinals, despite tragedy striking him during the pool stage when his son died.

== Personal life ==
On 30 September 2023, Tuisova's seven-year-old son Tito died after a long illness, hours before he was to partake in Fiji's 2023 World Cup match against Georgia. Despite this, Tuisova decided to continue playing on and missed his son's funeral.

== Honours ==
- Winner of the 2013–14 Top 14
- Winner of the 2013–14 Heineken Cup
- Winner of the 2014–15 ERC Cup
- Olympic Gold Medallist for Fiji sevens at the 2016 Rio Olympics.
