= Justin Blanchet =

Canadian rugby union player

- Born: 25 August 1993 (age 33) Canada
- Height: 193 cm (6 ft 4 in)
- Weight: 98 kg (216 lb; 15 st 6 lb)

Rugby union career
- Position: Flanker
Senior career
Years	Team	Apps	(Points)
2012–2013	Exeter Chiefs	3	(0)
2014–2019	Bedford Blues	74	(10)
- Correct as of 5 May 2021
International career
Years	Team	Apps	(Points)
2019	Canada	7	(0)
- Correct as of 5 May 2021

Justin Blanchet (born 25 August 1993) is a former Canadian rugby union player who played for the Exeter Chiefs and Bedford Blues. His playing position was flanker. He retired following his fourth concussion sustained in a warm-up match in the lead up to the 2019 Rugby World Cup. Previously, he had earned 7 caps for the Canada national team, making his debut against Brazil in the 2019 Americas Rugby Championship. His performances in the rest of the tournament saw him named in the Canada squad for the 2019 Rugby World Cup, however he withdrew from the squad following his concussion on 10 September 2019, following the warm-up match against the United States.
