= Paea Faʻanunu =

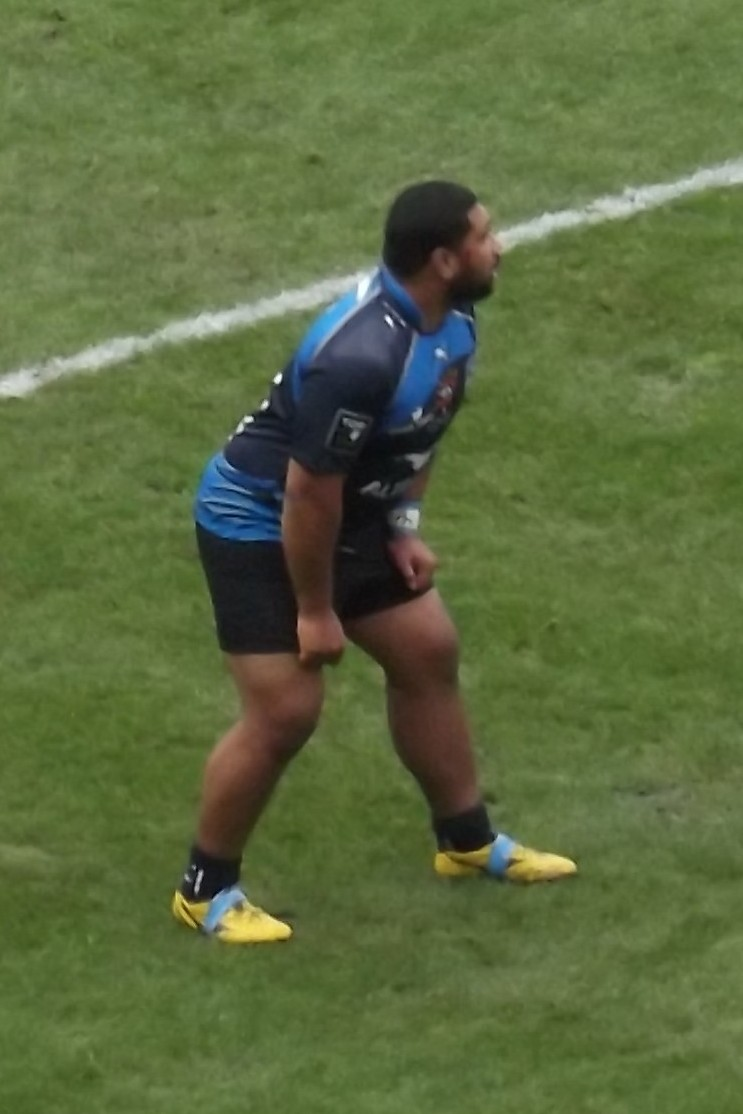
- Full name: Paea Okalani Fa'anunu
- Born: 4 November 1988 (age 38) Auckland, New Zealand
- Height: 1.87 m (6 ft 2 in)
- Weight: 124 kg (19 st 7 lb; 273 lb)
- School: Kelston Boys' High School

Rugby union career
- Position: Prop
- Current team: Castres
Senior career
Years	Team	Apps	(Points)
2008–2009	Auckland	17	(5)
2010	Northland	1	(0)
2011–2013	Canterbury	33	(25)
2013–2014	Montpellier	12	(0)
2014–2015	Castres	19	(15)
2016–2018	Dax	43	(25)
2018–	Castres	4	(0)
- Correct as of 22 May 2018
International career
Years	Team	Apps	(Points)
2008	New Zealand U20	4	(10)
2014–	Tonga	7	(0)
- Correct as of 22 May 2018

Paea Okalani Faʻanunu (born 4 November 1988) is a Tongan rugby union player. He plays in the prop position for the France based Top 14 side, Castres. Faʻanunu also represents Tonga at international level.

Faʻanunu played for Canterbury in the ITM Cup. His performances at domestic level had seen him named in the Crusaders wider training squad for the 2013 Super Rugby season. He made his international debut against Italy on 8 November 2014.

== Honours ==
=== Club ===
(France) Castres

- Top 14: 2017–18
