= Api Ratuniyarawa =

Fiji rugby union player (born 1986)

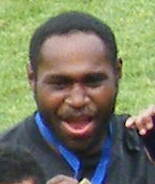
- Born: Apisalome Ratuniyarawa; 11 July 1986 (age 40) Sigatoka, Fiji
- Height: 1.98 m (6 ft 6 in)
- Weight: 115 kg (18 st 2 lb; 254 lb)
- School: Cuvu College

Rugby union career
- Position: Lock
Senior career
Years	Team	Apps	(Points)
2012	North Harbour	4	(5)
2013–2016	Agen	71	(25)
2016–2022	Northampton Saints	133	(30)
2022–2023	London Irish	21	(5)
- Correct as of 5 May 2023
International career
Years	Team	Apps	(Points)
2012–2023	Fiji	38	(15)
- Correct as of 23 June 2022

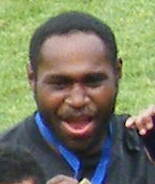
Api Ratuniyarawa in 2013

Api Ratuniyarawa (born 11 July 1986) is a Fijian former rugby union player who most recently played for English Premiership side London Irish until they went into administration. He was named in Fiji's squad for the 2015 Rugby World Cup. He was given a two-year and ten-month jail term in January 2024 after being convicted of sexual assault.

== Playing career ==
=== Northampton Saints ===
In September 2016, he signed for Northampton Saints joining another Fijian player, Campese Ma'afu at the club.

After joining Saints, the lock featured in three games for the club before being called away to Fiji for the Autumn Internationals, earning his 20th cap for his country against his Northampton Saints teammates Dylan Hartley, Courtney Lawes and Teimana Harrison at Twickenham on Saturday 19 November 2016.

Having racked up 31 appearances for the club, Ratuniyarawa was involved in the Saints' campaign to secure European Champions Cup rugby for the 2017/18 season. They beat Stade Français Paris in the European Champions Cup play-off final by one point to seal the last spot in the following season's competition, Ratuniyarawa coming off the bench to make an impact in that fixture.

=== International ===
The forward was also selected for Fiji's international summer series for 2017 alongside fellow Northampton Saint, Campese Ma'afu.

== Sexual assault conviction ==
In November 2023, Ratuniyarawa was charged with sexual assault by South Wales Police. He later pled guilty to two counts of assault by penetration and one count of sexual assault at Cardiff Crown Court. He was granted bail until a sentencing hearing on 9 January 2024 and was placed on the sex offenders register. He was given a two-year and ten-month jail term in January 2024. He is still serving his sentence in the UK and is facing potential deportation at the end of his sentence, despite having strong family ties to the UK.
