= Masalosalo Tutaia =

Samoa international rugby union player

- Born: 5 June 1984 (age 42) Tokoroa, New Zealand
- Height: 6 ft 8 in (203 cm)
- Weight: 260 lb (118 kg)

Rugby union career
- Position: Lock
International career
Years	Team	Apps	(Points)
2017	Samoa	1	(0)

Masalosalo Tutaia (born 5 June 1984) is a New Zealand-born Samoan former professional rugby union player.

Tutaia, born in Tokoroa, Waikato, is of Samoan descent and was capped once for Samoa in 2017, as a substitute against Tonga at Teufaiva Sport Stadium in Nukuʻalofa.

A lock, Tutaia plied his trade in France from 2013 to 2020. He was a nominee for Pro D2 player of the season with Stade Montois in 2015. Following his time at Stade Montois, Tutaia competed in France's top flight, the Top 14, with Section Paloise, USA Perpignan and Union Bordeaux Bègles.

Tutaia is the eldest brother of New Zealand netball international Maria Folau and brother-in-law of Israel Folau.

== See also ==
- List of Samoa national rugby union players
