= Sam Matavesi =

Fijian rugby union player (born 1982)

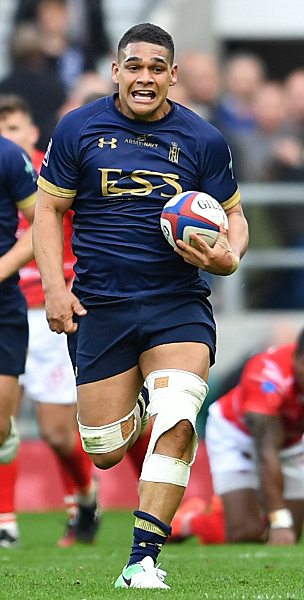
- Full name: Samuel Sireli Matavesi
- Born: 13 January 1992 (age 34) Truro, Cornwall
- Height: 183 cm (6 ft 0 in)
- Weight: 102 kg (225 lb; 16 st 1 lb)
- School: Camborne Science and International Academy
- Notable relative: Josh Matavesi (brother)

Rugby union career
- Position(s): Hooker; Openside flanker
- Current team: Camborne RFC
Senior career
Years	Team	Apps	(Points)
2012–2015	Plymouth Albion	37	(20)
2017–2019	Cornish Pirates	32	(60)
2019	→ Toulouse (loan)	3	(5)
2019–2024	Northampton Saints	80	(65)
2024–2025	Lyon	18	(10)
2025–	Camborne RFC	15	(25)
- Correct as of 3 September 2025
International career
Years	Team	Apps	(Points)
2013–	Fiji	38	(30)
- Correct as of 12 July 2025

Sam Matavesi (born 13 January 1992) is a Fijian rugby union player who plays for National League 1 side Camborne RFC. He has previously played notably for Northampton Saints and in the French Top 14 with Toulouse and Lyon. His position of choice is hooker even though he has played at openside flanker and Number 8 during spells of his career.

== Career ==
Sam is the younger brother of Josh Matavesi. His father, Sireli Matavesi came to England in the 1980s from Fiji and never left. He played for Cornwall, a team his 3 sons also played for. Sam also works for the Royal Navy, working out of the RNAS Culdrose as well as playing for their rugby union team.

He made his debut for the Flying Fijians against Canada in the 2013 IRB Pacific Nations Cup off the bench at Number 8. In December 2019, Matavesi joined Northampton Saints in the Premiership Rugby with immediate effect from the 2019–20 season.

After leaving Northampton Saints in 2024, Matavesi joined Lyon, his second stint with a Top 14 side, having already played for Toulouse earlier in his career.

After two seasons with Lyon, Matavesi moved back Cornwall to join Camborne RFC to play alongside his brother Josh Matavesi.
