= Afa Amosa =

Samoa international rugby union player (born 1990)

- Born: Afaesetiti Amosa; 11 October 1990 (age 36)
- Height: 6 ft 3 in (191 cm)
- Weight: 17 st 8 lb (246 lb; 112 kg)

Rugby union career
- Position: Number 8
- Current team: Aviron Bayonnais
Senior career
Years	Team	Apps	(Points)
2012–2013	Bizkaia Gernika	28?	(>55)
2013–2015	Colomiers	49	(25)
2015–2018	La Rochelle	65	(60)
2018–2021	Bordeaux	27	(35)
2021–	Bayonne	1	(5)
- Correct as of 13 September 2019
International career
Years	Team	Apps	(Points)
2019	Samoa	4	(10)
- Correct as of 13 September 2019

Afaesetiti Amosa (born 11 October 1990) is a Samoan rugby player for Aviron Bayonnais in France's Top 14, the highest level of French rugby. His primary position is number 8.

== Career ==
Born in Samoa Amosa moved to Australia at the age of four, and played his junior rugby for Moorabbin Rugby Club in Melbourne, featured for the Brumbies Academy side before returning to Melbourne to play for the Melbourne Rebels academy side.

In August 2012 Amosa moved to Bizkaia Gernika in Spain's División de Honor de Rugby, they also competed in the 2012–13 European Challenge Cup where Amosa played in 6 games. He caught the eye of US Colomiers' coach Bernard Goutta and moved to the Pro D2 side that summer. After two years in Colomiers he was due to sign for Toulon, but the transfer fell through and in September 2015 after starting the season with Colomiers he moved to Top 14 side La Rochelle.

On 25 March 2018 it was announced he had signed for Union Bordeaux Bègles on a two-year contract.

On 15 February 2021 it was announced he had signed for Aviron Bayonnais as medikal joker to help staying the club on Top14 ( actually they are in the thirteenth place ). In his first match against the Toulon, Afa made a try and the basque club won the match.

On 23 August 2019, Amosa was named in Samoa's 34-man training squad for the 2019 Rugby World Cup, before being named in the final 31 on 31 August.
