= Sa'asa'ai =

Village on the island of Savai'i in Samoa

Coordinates: 13°38′S 172°12′W

Sa'asa'ai is a village on the east coast of Savai'i island in Samoa. The village is part of the electoral constituency (Faipule District) of Fa'asaleleaga 4 which is within the larger political district (Itumalo) of Fa'asaleleaga. The population is 526 (2006 Census).
