= Latu Talakai =

Tongan rugby union player

- Full name: Sione Latu Talakai
- Born: 26 December 1979 (age 46) Neiafu, Vava'u, Tonga
- Height: 1.93 m (6 ft 4 in)
- Weight: 132 kg (291 lb)

Rugby union career
- Position: Prop
- Current team: Eastwood
Senior career
Years	Team	Apps	(Points)
2009-2018	Waikato		
2018-present	Eastwood		
- Correct as of 22 September 2019
International career
Years	Team	Apps	(Points)
2017–present	Tonga	6	(5)
- Correct as of 22 September 2019

Sione Latu Talakai (born 26 December 1989) is a Tongan rugby union player who generally plays as a prop represents Tonga internationally and plays for Australian Shute Shield club Eastwood. He was included in the Tongan squad for the 2019 Rugby World Cup which is held in Japan for the first time and also marks his first World Cup appearance. He helped captain the Wests Bulldogs to a premiership in 2022.

== Career ==
He made his international debut for Tonga against Wales on 16 June 2017. He was also part of the Tongan team which emerged as runners-up to Fiji at the 2017 World Rugby Pacific Nations Cup.
