= Jordan Lay =

Samoan rugby union player

- Full name: Jordan Andrew Lay
- Born: 5 November 1992 (age 34) Motoʻotua, Samoa
- Height: 1.84 m (6 ft 0 in)
- Weight: 117 kg (258 lb; 18 st 6 lb)
- School: King's College
- Notable relative: James Lay (brother)

Rugby union career
- Position: Prop
- Current team: Blues, Auckland
Senior career
Years	Team	Apps	(Points)
2017	Bay of Plenty	9	(0)
2017–2018	Edinburgh	12	(5)
2018–2020	Bristol Bears	6	(0)
2019–2021	→ Ospreys (loan)	5	(0)
2020	Bay of Plenty	8	(0)
2021–2022, 2024–	Auckland	13	(0)
2022–	Blues	27	(0)
- Correct as of 5 November 2024
International career
Years	Team	Apps	(Points)
2017–	Samoa	26	(0)
- Correct as of 28 August 2023

Jordan Andrew Lay (born 5 November 1992) is a Samoan professional rugby union player who plays as a prop for Super Rugby club Blues and the Samoa national team.

== Early life ==
Lay was born in Samoa, but moved to New Zealand with his parents at age 3 and went to school in Auckland.

== Club career ==
In December 2017 Lay joined Pro14 side Edinburgh Rugby for the remainder of the season after a 2017 ITM Cup campaign with Bay of Plenty. A request to add Lay to Edinburgh's European Challenge Cup squad in January 2018 was declined.

== International career ==
On 23 August 2019, he was named in Samoa's 34-man training squad for the 2019 Rugby World Cup, before being named in the final 31 on 31 August.
