= Piula Faʻasalele =

Piula Fa'asalele
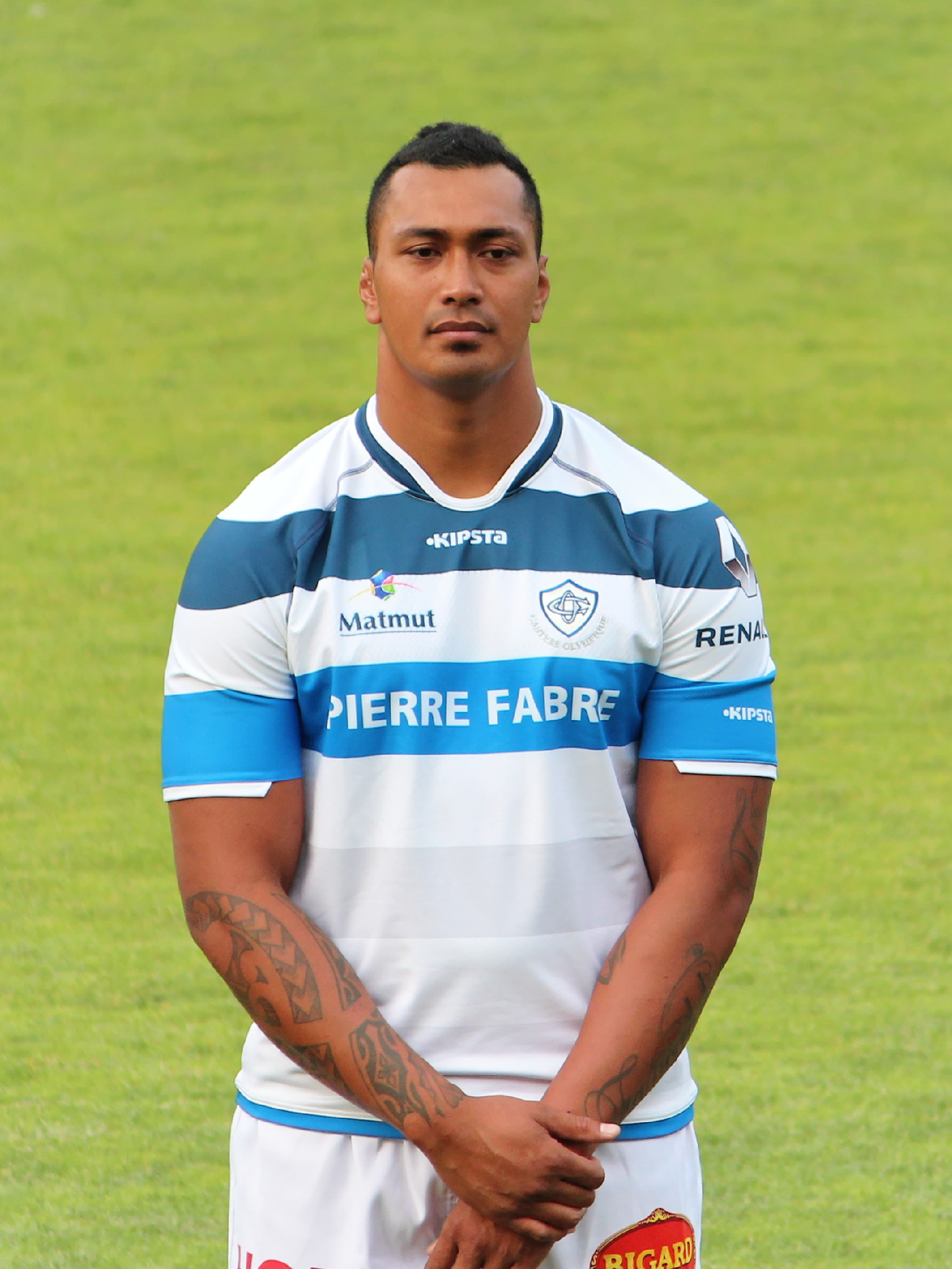
- Born: Piula Fa'asalele; 22 January 1988 (age 38) Wellington, New Zealand
- Height: 1.96 m (6 ft 5 in)
- Weight: 120 kg (18 st 13 lb; 265 lb)
- School: De La Salle College

Rugby union career
- Position: Flanker
Senior career
Years	Team	Apps	(Points)
2008–2009	Niort	9	(0)
2009–2012	La Rochelle	48	(35)
2012-2016	Castres	54	(5)
2016-2019	Stade Toulousain	66	(25)
2019-	USAP	70	(25)
- Correct as of 9 December 2019
International career
Years	Team	Apps	(Points)
2013-	Samoa	18	(10)
- Correct as of 14 September 2019

Piula Fa'asalele (born 1988) is a Samoan professional rugby union player. He currently plays at flanker for USAP in the Pro D2 (French's second division).

== Honours ==
Toulouse

- European Rugby Champions Cup: 2024
