= Elia Elia =

Samoan rugby union player

- Born: 22 January 1996 (age 30) Christchurch, New Zealand
- Height: 1.83 m (6 ft 0 in)
- Weight: 110 kg (17 st 5 lb; 243 lb)
- School: St Thomas Of Canterbury College
- Notable relative: George Naoupu

Rugby union career
- Position: Hooker
- Current team: Harlequins
Amateur team(s)
| Years | Team | Apps | (Points) |
| 2014-2016 | Canterbury University DIV 1 | | |
Senior career
| Years | Team | Apps | (Points) |
| 2016–2021 | Harlequins | 67 | (45) |
- Correct as of 9 June 2021
International career
| Years | Team | Apps | (Points) |
| 2014–16 | Samoa Under 20 | 9 | (35) |
| 2016– | Samoa | 6 | (0) |
- Correct as of 16 June 2018

Elia Elia (born 22 January 1996) is a Samoan rugby union player. His usual position is hooker and, since 2016, he has played for Harlequins.

Elia played most of his rugby in Christchurch, New Zealand. In 2013, he was selected for the Condor Sevens and, in 2014, the under-19 team, which he captained in 2015. In 2016, he was selected for Manu Samoa.

In 2016, he signed a contract with Harlequins. His contract was extended in 2017, and again in 2019.

In October 2020, he was banned for three matches for dangerous tackling.

He left Harlequins in 2021.
