= James Lay =

Samoa international rugby union player

- Full name: James Michael Lay
- Born: 16 December 1993 (age 32) Motoʻotua, Samoa
- Height: 1.80 m (5 ft 11 in)
- Weight: 118 kg (260 lb; 18 st 8 lb)
- School: King's College
- Notable relative: Jordan Lay (brother)

Rugby union career
- Position: Prop
- Current team: Auckland, Blues
Senior career
Years	Team	Apps	(Points)
2016	Auckland	4	(0)
2017–2018	Bay of Plenty	20	(10)
2018–2019	Bristol Bears	19	(0)
2020–2023	Auckland	14	(0)
2021– 2023	Blues	10	(0)
2024-2025	Moana Pasifika	6	(0)
2024-2025	North Harbour	5	(0)
- Correct as of 4 October 2025
International career
Years	Team	Apps	(Points)
2017–2023	Samoa	19	(0)
- Correct as of 4 October 2025

James Michael Lay (born 16 December 1993) is a Samoan former professional rugby union player who plays as a prop who represented the Samoa national team.

== International career ==
Lay was born in Samoa, but moved to New Zealand with his parents at age two and attended school in Auckland.

On 23 August 2019, he was named in Samoa's 34-man training squad for the 2019 Rugby World Cup, before being named in the final 31 on 31 August.

Lay retired from professional rugby at the end of 2025, finishing his career as the captain of Moana Pasifika.
