= Josh Matavesi =

Fiji international rugby union player

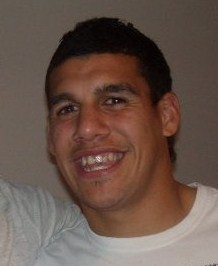
- Born: Joshua Lewis Matavesi; 5 October 1990 (age 36) Camborne, Cornwall
- Height: 1.88 m (6 ft 2 in)
- Weight: 123 kg (19 st 5 lb; 271 lb)
- School: Camborne Science and International Academy
- University: Truro College
- Notable relative(s): Joel Matavesi; Sam Matavesi; Sireli Matavesi

Rugby union career
- Position(s): Fly-half, Centre, Fullback
Amateur team(s)
Years	Team	Apps	(Points)
2006-2008	Camborne RFC	49	(25)
2008-2009	Mounts Bay RFC	13	(40)
Senior career
Years	Team	Apps	(Points)
2009-2011	Exeter Chiefs	61	(0)
2011-2012	Racing Métro	40	(10)
2012-2014	Worcester Warriors	48	(15)
2014-2017	Ospreys	121	(85)
2017-2020	Newcastle Falcons	89	(40)
2020-2021	Bath	46	(27)
2021-2023	Toyota Industries Shuttles	17	(49)
2024	NTT DoCoMo Red Hurricanes	2	(0)
2025-	Camborne RFC	27	(87)
- Correct as of 17 June 2022
International career
Years	Team	Apps	(Points)
2009-2010	Fiji U20	5	(23)
2008-2019	Fiji	47	(56)
- Correct as of 17 June 2022

Joshua Lewis Matavesi (born 5 October 1990) is a rugby union player, who currently plays for National League 1 side Camborne RFC, and formerly played for the Fiji national team at international level. Matavesi was born in Cornwall, England, to a Cornish mother and Fijian father.

== Early life ==
Matavesi was born in Camborne in Cornwall, to a Cornish mother and Fijian father. He identifies himself as "Cornish Fijian" and has said that he feels Cornish, not English. His father, Sireli Matavesi, who is from Vanua Balavu, Lau Islands, Fiji, toured the United Kingdom as a Fiji Barbarian in 1987 where he met his wife, Karen.

== Club career ==
Matavesi was offered a contract by the Camborne RFC. He also played rugby for the same club as his father. He also played for Mounts Bay RFC in National Division Two. He also played for Truro College and has also made a handful of appearances for Exeter United. In December 2008, he was called up to the England Under-20 squad for the 2009 Six Nations Under-20 tournament. He was signed on by the Exeter Chiefs in August 2009 before making his debut against Sale Sharks at fullback. Josh played in the 2010 IRB Junior World Championship with Fiji U20s in Argentina. It was then announced that he had signed on for Racing Métro 92 in the Top 14 competition as a Medical Joker for Juan Martín Hernández. He made his Top 14 debut off the bench against SU Agen in April 2011. In 2012, he signed a contract with Worcester Warriors. On 31 January 2014 he signed for the Ospreys. Josh signed to play for the Newcastle Falcons in the Aviva Premiership from the 2017–18 season. He subsequently joined Bath in January 2020.

On 9 September 2021, Matavesi departed Bath to travel to Japan to join Toyota Industries Shuttles Aichi in Japan Rugby League One competition from the 2021-22 season.

In 2025, Matavesi rejoined his hometown club, Camborne RFC. In the proceeding 25/26 season, the team gained promotion into National League 1 (English third tier) for the first time in the clubs history.

== International career ==
In November 2009, he was called up to join the Fiji team for the 2009 Autumn Internationals against Scotland, Ireland and Romania. He made his debut against Scotland playing at fullback and was replaced in the second-half. He came off the bench against Ireland, replacing Norman Ligairi at fullback, but in the final test against Romania, he started at flyhalf because Fiji's first choice 10, Nicky Little had already returned to his club along with a few other players. Fiji defeated the Romanians 29 - 18 with Matavesi scoring 9 points and converting 3 of the 4 tries.

He was part of Fiji's U20 team in the 2010 IRB Junior World Championship in June 2010. In October, he was selected again to the Fiji team to take part in Fiji's end of year rugby tour to Europe.

In 2015 Matavesi was named in Fiji's 2015 Rugby World Cup squad.

On 22 May 2018 he was named in the Barbarians squad to face England in the Quilter Cup Fixture. Following fitness tests, It was determined Bundee Aki and Charles Piutau would both miss the game while fly-half AJ MacGinty was withdrawn by his club. This led to Matavesi, Finn Russell and Malakai Fekitoa being added to the squad with the addition of Denis Buckley and Newcastle Falcons teammate Nili Latu. The Barbarians beat England 63–45.

On 9 October 2019, after the conclusion of Fiji's involvement of the 2019 Rugby World Cup, Matevasi announced his retirement from international rugby, via a post on Instagram.
