= Campese Ma'afu =

Australian rugby union player (born 1984)

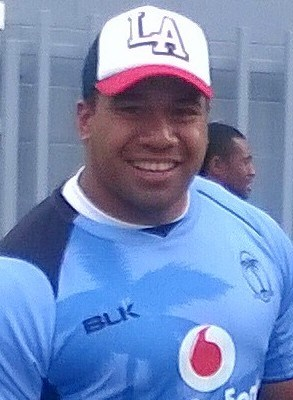
- Born: George David Campese Ma'afu; 19 December 1984 (age 41) Sydney, Australia
- Height: 1.81 m (5 ft 11 1/2 in)
- Weight: 118 kg (18 st 8 lb; 260 lb)
- School: Granville Boys High School
- Notable relative(s): Salesi Ma'afu (brother); Apakuki Ma'afu (brother)
- Occupation: Security

Rugby union career
- Position: Loosehead prop
Senior career
Years	Team	Apps	(Points)
2010–2012	West Harbour	??	(??)
2012–2013	Cardiff Blues	5	(5)
2013–2015	Nottingham	36	(20)
2015–2016	Provence	7	(0)
2016–2018	Northampton Saints	36	(0)
2018–2019	Leicester Tigers	9	(0)
- Correct as of 15 May 2019
International career
Years	Team	Apps	(Points)
2010–Present	Fiji	58	(10)
- Correct as of 7 September 2019

Campese Ma'afu, (born 19 December 1984) is an Australian professional rugby union player. Ma'afu was selected to the Fiji national squad in 2010 and has gone on to win more than 50 caps. Ma'afu has also played professionally for Cardiff Blues, Nottingham, Provence, Northampton Saints and Leicester Tigers.

== Career ==
=== Family ===
Campese is the second oldest out 3 brothers, Salesi & Apakuki, born and raised in the Western suburbs of Sydney, he is of Tongan heritage through his father and Fijian heritage on his mother's side. His father and mother hail from the villages of Kolovai & Drue, Kadavu respectively.

The Ma'afu family made an especially interesting mark in rugby history in 2010 when the two brothers, Salesi and Campese, played against each other in a test match between Australia and Fiji. Elder brother Salesi played for the Wallabies at tight-head Prop while younger brother Campese played for Fiji at loose-head prop. A third brother, the youngest, 'Apakuki, plays for Tonga.

=== Club career ===
Ma'afu joined Cardiff Blues for the start of the Pro12 2012/13 season. He signed to play for Nottingham R.F.C. in the RFU Championship in the 2013/14 season. He remained at Nottingham until signing for the French Pro D2 club Provence in 2015.

In 2016, he signed for Aviva Premiership side, Northampton Saints with immediate effect from the 2016–17 season.

Ma'afu has since notched up 14 appearances for the Midlands side and most recently helped Saints' second the Northampton Wanderers reach the final of the Aviva 'A' League. Ma'afu and the side beat Gloucester United 36–15 to take the title.

It was announced on 5 June 2017 that Ma'afu would link up with fellow Saints Api Ratuniyarawa and head back to Fiji for the summer international.

After 2 seasons with Northampton, Ma'afu initially signed for Ealing Trailfinders before subsequently joining Leicester Tigers for the 2018/19 season. On 15 May 2019 he was announced as one of the players to leave Leicester following the end of the 2018–19 Premiership Rugby season.
