= 2017 end-of-year rugby union internationals =

The 2017 end-of-year rugby union internationals, also known as the November internationals, or autumn internationals in the Northern Hemisphere, were international rugby union matches in 2017.

Rugby Championship winners New Zealand travelled to France for two matches (one an uncapped XV match), Scotland and Wales. Argentina faced England, Ireland and Italy - with the latter two countries also hosting South Africa. The Springboks also faced their June test series opposition, France, whom they had beaten 3–0, before ending their tour in Wales, after the international window. Having beaten New Zealand in the third Bledisloe Cup Test match in October, Australia travelled to play Wales, England and Scotland, the latter of whom had beaten the Wallabies in Sydney during the June internationals.

Four Tier 2 nations faced Tier 1 opposition during the international window. Ireland and Italy hosted Fiji, the first time since 2009 for Ireland. England and Scotland played host to Samoa. France and Wales hosted historic matches against Tier 2 opposition, with Wales playing Georgia for the first time and France hosting Japan for the first time in the professional era; Japan's previous visit to France came in 1973. For Japan this was the third time in five years that they had played two Tier 1 opponents during the November tests, having already hosted Australia prior to their away match against France.

== Tier 2 and Tier 3 ==
After defeating Canada and the United States away earlier in the year, Georgia played host to the same opposition at home. Romania took on Pacific opposition, hosting Samoa, and playing Samoa, for the first time since 1989, before playing host to Tonga after losing for the first time against them in 2015. For the second year in a row, Spain faced Tier 2 opposition from outside of Europe, facing Canada in what was the first meeting since they first played in 2010. As in previous November internationals, travelling Tier 2 nations faced each other at neutral venues in Europe. This year saw Japan face Tonga in Toulouse, while Fiji faced Canada in Narbonne. With Uruguay's 2019 Rugby World Cup qualifier play-offs taking place in February 2018, they embarked on a two-test series against Namibia as preparation. This was the first time since 2000 that the two nations has met, and the first time Namibia hosted the Los Teros.

Having won their two-test series against Brazil in November 2015 and November 2016, Germany faced Brazil for the third year in a row, this time in a one-off test match. Germany later went on to face Chile and the United States, in what were historic first ever matches between the respective nations. Brazil also faced historic opposition, playing Belgium and Spain for the first time.

== Fixtures ==
=== 21 October ===
21 October 2017
19:00 AEST (UTC+10)

Australia	23–18	New Zealand
Try: Hodge 6' c Folau 39' m Koroibete 56' m Con: Foley (1/3) 8'; Pen: Hodge (2/2) 63', 77'	Report	Try: Naholo 13' c Ioane 70' m Con: Sopoaga (1/1) 15'; Pen: Sopoaga (2/2) 24', 30'

Lang Park, Brisbane
Attendance: 45,107
Referee: Wayne Barnes (England)

Team details

FB	15	Israel Folau
RW	14	Marika Koroibete
OC	13	Tevita Kuridrani
IC	12	Kurtley Beale	(substituted off) 69'
LW	11	Reece Hodge
FH	10	Bernard Foley
SH	9	Will Genia	(substituted off) 74'
N8	8	Sean McMahon
OF	7	Michael Hooper (c)
BF	6	Jack Dempsey	(substituted off) 72'
RL	5	Adam Coleman
LL	4	Rob Simmons	(substituted off) 42'
TP	3	Sekope Kepu	(substituted off) 60'
HK	2	Tatafu Polota-Nau	(substituted off) 60'
LP	1	Scott Sio	(substituted off) 64'
Replacements:
HK	16	Stephen Moore	(substituted on) 60'
PR	17	Tom Robertson	(substituted on) 64'
PR	18	Allan Alaalatoa	(substituted on) 60'
LK	19	Lukhan Tui	(substituted on) 42'
FL	20	Ned Hanigan	(substituted on) 72'
SH	21	Nick Phipps	(substituted on) 74'
CE	22	Samu Kerevi	(substituted on) 69'
WG	23	Henry Speight
Coach:
(Australia) Michael Cheika

FB	15	Damian McKenzie
RW	14	Waisake Naholo
OC	13	Ryan Crotty	(substituted off) 69'
IC	12	Sonny Bill Williams
LW	11	Rieko Ioane	(substituted off) 21'	(substituted on) 30'
FH	10	Lima Sopoaga			(substituted off) 60'
SH	9	Aaron Smith	(substituted off) 64'
N8	8	Kieran Read (c)
OF	7	Sam Cane
BF	6	Liam Squire	(substituted off) 74'
RL	5	Scott Barrett	(substituted off) 60'
LL	4	Sam Whitelock
TP	3	Nepo Laulala	(substituted off) 50'
HK	2	Dane Coles	(substituted off) 60'
LP	1	Kane Hames	(substituted off) 37'
Replacements:
HK	16	Codie Taylor	(substituted on) 60'
PR	17	Wyatt Crockett	(substituted on) 37'
PR	18	Ofa Tu'ungafasi	(substituted on) 50'
LK	19	Patrick Tuipulotu	(substituted on) 60'
FL	20	Ardie Savea	(substituted on) 74'
SH	21	TJ Perenara	(substituted on) 64'
CE	22	Anton Lienert-Brown	(substituted on) 69'
WG	23	David Havili	(substituted on) 21'	(substituted off) 30'	(substituted on) 60'
Coach:
(New Zealand) Steve Hansen

Man of the Match:
Jack Dempsey (Australia)

Touch judges:
Marius van der Westhuizen (South Africa)
Egon Seconds (South Africa)
Television match official:
Marius Jonker (South Africa)

Notes:

- Sam Cane (New Zealand) earned his 50th test cap.
- This was the first time New Zealand had lost multiple tests in a calendar year since 2011. It was also the first time they had failed to win more than 2 tests since 2009.

=== 28 October ===
28 October 2017
15:00 AEDST (UTC+11)

Australia	31–28	Barbarians
Try: Paia'aua (2) 8' m, 61' c Speight 40' c Dempsey 53' m Moore 72' c Con: Paia'aua (3/5) 40', 62', 73'	Report	Try: Ready 24' c Naiyaravoro (2) 27' c, 66' c Banks 29' c Con: Cooper (4/4) 25', 28', 31', 68'

Sydney Football Stadium, Sydney
Attendance: 17,021
Referee: Brendon Pickerill (New Zealand)

Team details

FB	15	Karmichael Hunt
RW	14	Henry Speight
OC	13	Samu Kerevi	(substituted off) 48'
IC	12	Bill Meakes	(substituted off) 55'
LW	11	Israel Folau
FH	10	Duncan Paia'aua
SH	9	Nick Phipps (c)	(substituted off) 68'
N8	8	Lopeti Timani	(substituted off) 62'
OF	7	Jack Dempsey	(substituted off) 76'
BF	6	Ned Hanigan
RL	5	Lukhan Tui	(substituted off) 35'
LL	4	Kane Douglas
TP	3	Allan Alaalatoa	(substituted off) 59'	(substituted on) 74'
HK	2	Jordan Uelese	(substituted off) 48'
LP	1	Tom Robertson	(substituted off) 65'
Replacements:
HK	16	Stephen Moore	(substituted on) 48'
PR	17	Tetera Faulkner	(substituted on) 65'
PR	18	Jermaine Ainsley	(substituted on) 59'	(substituted off) 74'
FL	19	Liam Wright	(substituted on) 62'
N8	20	Ben McCalman	(substituted on) 35'
SH	21	Joe Powell	(substituted on) 68'
WG	22	Curtis Rona	(substituted on) 55'
WG	23	Izaia Perese	(substituted on) 48'
Coach:
(Australia) Michael Cheika

FB	15	(Samoa) Tim Nanai-Williams
RW	14	(Australia) Tom Banks		(substituted off) 74'
OC	13	(Australia) Eto Nabuli
IC	12	(New Zealand) George Moala
LW	11	(Australia) Taqele Naiyaravoro	(yellow card) 70' to 80'
FH	10	(Australia) Quade Cooper (c)	(yellow card) 71' to 80'
SH	9	(New Zealand) Augustine Pulu		(substituted off) 74'
N8	8	(Australia) Wycliff Palu		(substituted off) 54'
OF	7	(Australia) Matt Hodgson				(substituted off) 54'
BF	6	(Fiji) Isi Naisarani
RL	5	(Australia) Sam Carter		(substituted off) 3'	(substituted on) 16'
LL	4	(Australia) Luke Jones
TP	3	(Tonga) Taniela Tupou		(substituted off) 74'
HK	2	(Australia) Andrew Ready		(substituted off) 63'
LP	1	(Australia) Pekahou Cowan		(substituted off) 62'
Replacements:
HK	16	(New Zealand) Anaru Rangi		(substituted on) 63'
PR	17	(Australia) Ben Alexander		(substituted on) 62'
PR	18	(Australia) Salesi Manu		(substituted on) 74'
LK	19	(Australia) Matt Philip		(substituted on) 3'	(substituted off) 16'	(substituted on) 54'
N8	20	(Australia) Kane Koteka		(substituted on) 54'
SH	21	(Australia) Theo Strang		(substituted on) 74'
FH	22	(Australia) Sam Greene		(substituted on) 74'
WG	23	(Australia) Andrew Kellaway
Coach:
(Australia) Alan Jones

Touch judges:
Jamie Nutbrown (New Zealand)
James Leckie (Australia)
Television match official:
Aaron Paterson (New Zealand)

28 October 2017
15:00 JST (UTC+9)

Japan	27–47	World XV
Try: Noguchi 33' c Teaupa 74' c Helu 80' c Con: Tamura (1/1) 34'; Matsuda (2/2) 74', 80'; Pen: Tamura (2/2) 15', 28'	Report	Try: Fujita (2) 6' c, 56' c Aso 21' c Wykes 44' m Strauss 51' c Flynn 63' c Buckman 78' c Con: Goromaru (5/6) 7', 23', 52', 58', 64'; Yamasawa (1/1) 79'

Level5 Stadium, Fukuoka
Attendance: 10,303
Referee: Nic Berry (Australia)

Team details

FB	15	Ryuji Noguchi	(yellow card) 42' to 52'
RW	14	Lomano Lemeki
OC	13	Sione Teaupa
IC	12	Ryoto Nakamura
LW	11	Akihito Yamada		(substituted off) 12'
FH	10	Yu Tamura		(substituted off) 50'
SH	9	Fumiaki Tanaka		(substituted off) 8'
N8	8	Michael Leitch (c)
OF	7	Shunsuke Nunomaki		(substituted off) 54'
BF	6	Yoshitaka Tokunaga		(substituted off) 40'
RL	5	Wimpie van der Walt		(substituted off) 50'
LL	4	Kazuki Himeno		(substituted off) 58'
TP	3	Koo Ji-won		(substituted off) 50'
HK	2	Atsushi Sakate		(substituted off) 50'
LP	1	Keita Inagaki		(substituted off) 58'
Replacements:
HK	16	Takeshi Hino		(substituted on) 50'
PR	17	Shintaro Ishihara		(substituted on) 58'
PR	18	Asaeli Ai Valu		(substituted on) 50'
LK	19	Kotaro Yatabe		(substituted on) 58'
LK	20	Uwe Helu		(substituted on) 50'
N8	21	Fetuani Lautaimi		(substituted on) 40'
FL	22	Shuhei Matsuhashi		(substituted on) 54'
SH	23	Yutaka Nagare		(substituted on) 8'
FH	24	Rikiya Matsuda		(substituted on) 12'
CE	25	Ryohei Yamanaka		(substituted on) 50'
Coach:
(New Zealand) Jamie Joseph

FB	15	(Japan) Ayumu Goromaru		(substituted off) 64'
RW	14	(Japan) Yoshikazu Fujita			(substituted off) 79'
OC	13	(New Zealand) Richard Buckman
IC	12	(South Africa) Harold Vorster
LW	11	(New Zealand) Vince Aso
FH	10	(Australia) Berrick Barnes		(substituted off) 69'
SH	9	(New Zealand) Andrew Ellis (c)		(substituted off) 54'
N8	8	(South Africa) Willie Britz
OF	7	(Australia) Ed Quirk		(substituted off) 61'
BF	6	(South Africa) Kwagga Smith
RL	5	(South Africa) RG Snyman
LL	4	(England) Geoff Parling		(substituted off) 40'
TP	3	(South Africa) Ruan Smith		(substituted off) 54'	(substituted on) 79'
HK	2	(South Africa) Adriaan Strauss		(substituted off) 54'
LP	1	(South Africa) Jacques van Rooyen		(substituted off) 40'
Replacements:
HK	16	(New Zealand) Corey Flynn		(substituted on) 54'
PR	17	(New Zealand) Greg Pleasants-Tate			(substituted on) 69'
PR	18	(Argentina) Facundo Gigena		(substituted on) 40'	(substituted off) 69'
LK	19	(Australia) Sam Wykes		(substituted on) 40'
FL	20	(Italy) Simone Favaro		(substituted on) 61'
SH	21	(Australia) Nic Stirzaker		(substituted on) 54'
FH	22	(Japan) Takuya Yamasawa		(substituted on) 69'
WG	23	(Australia) Digby Ioane		(substituted on) 64'
PR	24	(South Africa) JP Smith	(yellow card) 72' to 80'	(substituted on) 54'
Coach:
(New Zealand) Robbie Deans

Touch judges:
Angus Gardner (Australia)
Rohan Hoffmann (Australia)
Television match official:
Ian Smith (Australia)

=== 3/4 November ===
3 November 2017
19:00 PDT (UTC-07)

Canada	9–51	Māori All Blacks
Pen: Staller (3/3) 6', 16', 20'	Report	Try: Curtis 17' c Ioane 27' c Franklin 38' c Ngatai 52' c Stevenson 62' m Garden-Bachop 68' c Wainui 78' m Con: West (4/4) 18', 28', 39', 53'; Garden-Bachop (1/3) 69'; Pen: West (2/2) 3', 35'

BC Place, Vancouver
Attendance: 29,480
Referee: Kurt Weaver (United States)

Team details

FB	15	Andrew Coe
RW	14	Brock Staller
OC	13	Ben LeSage		(substituted off) 56'
IC	12	Guiseppe du Toit		(substituted off) 70'
LW	11	Dan Moor
FH	10	Pat Parfrey
SH	9	Phil Mack (c)		(substituted off) 70'
N8	8	Tyler Ardron
OF	7	Matt Heaton
BF	6	Dustin Dobravsky		(substituted off) 57'
RL	5	Josh Larsen	(yellow card) 57' to 67'
LL	4	Kyle Baillie		(substituted off) 50'
TP	3	Matt Tierney		(substituted off) 64'
HK	2	Ray Barkwill		(substituted off) 65'
LP	1	Hubert Buydens		(substituted off) 64'
Replacements:
HK	16	Eric Howard		(substituted on) 65'
PR	17	Djustice Sears-Duru		(substituted on) 64'
PR	18	Ryan Kotlewski		(substituted on) 64'
FL	19	Lucas Rumball		(substituted on) 57'
LK	20	Evan Olmstead		(substituted on) 50'
SH	21	Andrew Ferguson		(substituted on) 70'
FH	22	Robbie Povey		(substituted on) 77'
WG	23	Kainoa Lloyd		(substituted on) 56'
Coach:
(Wales) Kingsley Jones

FB	15	Charlie Ngatai
RW	14	Sean Wainui
OC	13	Tim Bateman	(yellow card) 42' to 52'
IC	12	Rob Thompson
LW	11	Ambrose Curtis		(substituted off) 25'
FH	10	Ihaia West		(substituted off) 53'
SH	9	Brad Weber		(substituted off) 66'
N8	8	Akira Ioane
OF	7	Dan Pryor	(yellow card) 15' to 25'	(substituted off) 58'
BF	6	Tom Franklin
RL	5	Jarrad Hoeata		(substituted off) 50'
LL	4	Jackson Hemopo
TP	3	Marcel Renata		(substituted off) 50'
HK	2	Ash Dixon (c)		(substituted off) 66'
LP	1	Chris Eves		(substituted off) 50'
Replacements:
HK	16	Liam Polwart		(substituted on) 66'
PR	17	Ross Wright		(substituted on) 50'
PR	18	Tyrel Lomax		(substituted on) 50'
FL	19	Jordan Manihera		(substituted on) 50'
FL	20	Sam Henwood		(substituted on) 58'
SH	21	Te Toiroa Tahuriorangi		(substituted on) 66'
FH	22	Jackson Garden-Bachop		(substituted on) 53'
WG	23	Shaun Stevenson		(substituted on) 25'
Coach:
(New Zealand) Clayton McMillan

Touch judges:
Derek Summers (United States)
Josh Houston (United States)
Television match official:
Marc Nelson (United States)

Notes:

- This set a record attendance for a Test rugby match in Canada.

4 November 2017
14:40 JST (UTC+9)

Japan	30–63	Australia
Try: Van der Walt 44' c Mafi 68' c Himeno 80' c Con: Matsuda (1/1) 44'; Tamura (2/2) 69', 80'; Pen: Matsuda (3/4) 17', 48', 53'	Report	Try: Kerevi (2) 5' c, 50' c Speight 11' c Polota-Nau 24' c Kuridrani (3) 32' c, 39' c, 56' c Phipps 61' c Simmons 64' c Con: Hodge (9/9) 6, 11, 24, 34, 40, 52, 57, 62, 65'

International Stadium Yokohama, Yokohama
Attendance: 43,621
Referee: Nick Briant (New Zealand)

Team details

FB	15	Kotaro Matsushima
RW	14	Lomano Lemeki	(substituted off) 60'
OC	13	Timothy Lafaele
IC	12	Harumichi Tatekawa	(substituted off) 52'
LW	11	Ryuji Noguchi
FH	10	Rikiya Matsuda
SH	9	Fumiaki Tanaka	(substituted off) 60'
N8	8	Amanaki Mafi
OF	7	Shunsuke Nunomaki	(substituted off) 63'
BF	6	Michael Leitch (c)
RL	5	Uwe Helu	(substituted off) 19'
LL	4	Kazuki Himeno
TP	3	Takuma Asahara	(substituted off) 52'
HK	2	Shota Horie	(substituted off) 63'
LP	1	Keita Inagaki	(substituted off) 72'
Replacements:
HK	16	Atsushi Sakate	(substituted on) 63'
PR	17	Koki Yamamoto	(substituted on) 72'
PR	18	Asaeli Ai Valu	(substituted on) 52'
LK	19	Wimpie van der Walt	(substituted on) 19'
N8	20	Fetuani Lautaimi	(substituted on) 63'
SH	21	Yutaka Nagare	(substituted on) 60'
FH	22	Yu Tamura	(substituted on) 60'
CE	23	Sione Teaupa	(substituted on) 52'
Coach:
(New Zealand) Jamie Joseph

FB	15	Kurtley Beale	(substituted off) 58'
RW	14	Henry Speight
OC	13	Tevita Kuridrani
IC	12	Samu Kerevi
LW	11	Marika Koroibete
FH	10	Reece Hodge
SH	9	Nick Phipps	(substituted off) 67'
N8	8	Sean McMahon	(substituted off) 62'
OF	7	Michael Hooper (c)	(substituted off) 62'
BF	6	Ned Hanigan
RL	5	Adam Coleman	(substituted off) 62'	(substituted on) 75'
LL	4	Rob Simmons		(substituted off) 75'
TP	3	Sekope Kepu	(substituted off) 58'
HK	2	Tatafu Polota-Nau	(substituted off) 52'
LP	1	Scott Sio	(substituted off) 58'
Replacements:
HK	16	Stephen Moore	(substituted on) 52'
PR	17	Tom Robertson	(substituted on) 58'
PR	18	Allan Alaalatoa	(substituted on) 58'
LK	19	Matt Philip	(substituted on) 62'
N8	20	Ben McCalman	(substituted on) 62'
N8	21	Lopeti Timani	(substituted on) 62'
FH	22	Joe Powell	(substituted on) 67'
WG	23	Curtis Rona	(substituted on) 58'
Coach:
(Australia) Michael Cheika

Touch judges:
Mike Fraser (New Zealand)
Tim Baker (Hong Kong)
Television match official:
Ben Skeen (New Zealand)

Notes:

- Asaeli Ai Valu, Kazuki Himeno, Fetuani Lautaimi, Sione Teaupa and Wimpie van der Walt (all Japan) and Matt Philip (Australia) made their international debuts.
- Ben McCalman (Australia) earned his 50th Test cap.
- Japan's 30 points was the most they had scored against Australia in a Test match, surpassing their previous record of 25 set in 1975.
- The 43,621 attendance was a record for a Test match in Japan.

4 November 2017
15:00 GMT (UTC+0)

Barbarians	22–31	New Zealand
Try: Mo'unga 8' m Bridge (2) 14' m, 80' m Carter 28' c Con: Mo'unga (1/4) 29'	Report	Try: Perenara 17' m Fifita 34' m Laumape 52' c Cane 54' c Harris 58' c Con: B. Barrett (3/4) 53', 55', 59'

Twickenham Stadium, London
Attendance: 63,000
Referee: Nigel Owens (Wales)

Team details

FB	15	(New Zealand) George Bridge
RW	14	(New Zealand) Julian Savea
OC	13	(New Zealand) Richard Buckman	(substituted off) 67'
IC	12	(South Africa) Harold Vorster
LW	11	(New Zealand) Vince Aso
FH	10	(New Zealand) Richie Mo'unga
SH	9	(New Zealand) Andrew Ellis (c)	(substituted off) 50'
N8	8	(New Zealand) Luke Whitelock
OF	7	(South Africa) Kwagga Smith
BF	6	(New Zealand) Steve Luatua	(substituted off) 61'
RL	5	(New Zealand) Dominic Bird	(substituted off) 49'
LL	4	(Australia) Sam Carter	(substituted off) 52'
TP	3	(New Zealand) Atunaisa Moli	(substituted off) 45'
HK	2	(South Africa) Adriaan Strauss	(substituted off) 60'
LP	1	(South Africa) Jacques van Rooyen	(substituted off) 45'
Replacements:
HK	16	(South Africa) Akker van der Merwe	(substituted on) 60'
PR	17	(New Zealand) Ben Franks	(substituted on) 45'
PR	18	(South Africa) Ruan Smith	(substituted on) 45'
N8	19	(South Africa) Willie Britz	(substituted on) 49'
FL	20	(South Africa) Ruan Ackermann	(substituted on) 52'
SH	21	(New Zealand) Mitchell Drummond	(substituted on) 50'
FH	22	(South Africa) Robert du Preez	(substituted on) 67'
FL	23	(New Zealand) Dillon Hunt	(substituted on) 61'
Coach:
(New Zealand) Robbie Deans

FB	15	David Havili			(substituted off) 45'
RW	14	Waisake Naholo	(substituted off) 67'
OC	13	Anton Lienert-Brown
IC	12	Ngani Laumape
LW	11	Seta Tamanivalu
FH	10	Beauden Barrett (c)	(substituted off) 14'	(substituted on) 21'
SH	9	TJ Perenara	(substituted off) 45'
N8	8	Jerome Kaino	(substituted off) 45'
OF	7	Ardie Savea
BF	6	Vaea Fifita
RL	5	Scott Barrett	(substituted off) 54'	63' to 67'
LL	4	Luke Romano		(substituted off) 63'	(substituted on) 67'
TP	3	Ofa Tu'ungafasi	(substituted off) 67'
HK	2	Nathan Harris	(substituted off) 67'
LP	1	Kane Hames	(substituted off) 54'
Replacements:
HK	16	Asafo Aumua	(substituted on) 67'
PR	17	Tim Perry	(substituted on) 54'
PR	18	Jeffery Toomaga-Allen	(substituted on) 67'
LK	19	Patrick Tuipulotu	(substituted on) 54'
FL	20	Sam Cane	(substituted on) 45'
SH	21	Tawera Kerr-Barlow	(substituted on) 45'
FH	22	Lima Sopoaga	(substituted on) 14'	(substituted off) 21'	(substituted on) 45'
WG	23	Matt Duffie	(substituted on) 67'
Coach:
(New Zealand) Steve Hansen

Man of the Match:
(South Africa) Kwagga Smith (Barbarians)

Touch judges:
Nic Berry (Australia)
Ben Whitehouse (Wales)
Television match official:
Rowan Kitt (England)

Notes:

- New Zealand claimed the Killik Cup.

=== 10/11 November ===
10 November 2017
19:30 WET (UTC+0)

Barbarians	27–24	Tonga
Try: Naiyaravoro 17' m Bridge 20' c Murphy 68' c Ellis 73' m Con: Du Preez (2/4) 21', 69'; Pen: Du Preez (1/1) 35'	Report	Try: Pakalani 1' c Lokotui 8' c Vailanu (2) 62' m, 78' m Con: Takulua (2/3) 3', 10'

Thomond Park, Limerick
Referee: Frank Murphy (Ireland)

Team details

FB	15	(New Zealand) George Bridge
RW	14	(Australia) Taqele Naiyaravoro	(substituted off) 63'
OC	13	(New Zealand) Richard Buckman
IC	12	(South Africa) Harold Vorster
LW	11	(New Zealand) Vince Aso
FH	10	(South Africa) Robert du Preez
SH	9	(Australia) Nic Stirzaker	(substituted off) 14'
N8	8	(South Africa) Willie Britz
OF	7	(Italy) Simone Favaro	(substituted off) 50'
BF	6	(Ireland) Jordi Murphy
RL	5	(Ireland) Quinn Roux	(substituted off) 45'
LL	4	(England) Geoff Parling (c)	(substituted off) 40'
TP	3	(Ireland) Brian Scott	(substituted off) 40'
HK	2	(South Africa) Akker van der Merwe	(substituted off) 50'
LP	1	(Ireland) James Cronin	(substituted off) 8'
Replacements:
HK	16	(South Africa) Adriaan Strauss	(substituted on) 50'
PR	17	(South Africa) Jacques van Rooyen	(substituted on) 8'
PR	18	(South Africa) Ruan Smith	(substituted on) 40'
LK	19	(Ireland) Donncha O'Callaghan	(substituted on) 40'
FL	20	(Ireland) John Muldoon	(substituted on) 50'
SH	21	(New Zealand) Andrew Ellis	(substituted on) 14'
WG	22	(Samoa) David Smith	(substituted on) 63'
LK	23	(Australia) Sam Carter	(substituted on) 45'
Coach:
(New Zealand) Robbie Deans

FB	15	Atieli Pakalani
RW	14	David Halaifonua
OC	13	Nafi Tuitavake	(substituted off) 72'
IC	12	Tevita Taufu’i	(substituted off) 11'
LW	11	Cooper Vuna
FH	10	Kali Hala
SH	9	Sonatane Takulua (c)	(substituted off) 70'
N8	8	Maama Vaipulu	(substituted off) 50'
OF	7	Fotu Lokotui
BF	6	Daniel Faleafa
RL	5	Steve Mafi
LL	4	Leva Fifita	(substituted off) 50'
TP	3	Ben Tameifuna	(substituted off) 57'
HK	2	Sione Lea	(substituted off) 63'
LP	1	Paea Faʻanunu	(substituted off) 40'
Replacements:
HK	16	Maile Ngauamo	(substituted on) 63'
PR	17	Latu Talakai	(substituted on) 40'
PR	18	Halani Aulika	(substituted on) 57'
LK	19	Onehunga Havili	(substituted on) 50'
FL	20	Sione Vailanu	(substituted on) 50'
SH	21	Shinnosuke Tu'umoto'oa	(substituted on) 70'
WG	22	Penikolo Latu	(substituted on) 11'
CE	23	Fetuli Paea	(substituted on) 72'
Coach:
(Australia) Toutai Kefu

Touch judges:
Sean Gallagher (Ireland)
Joy Neville (Ireland)

10 November 2017
20:45 CET (UTC+1)

French Barbarians	19–15	Māori All Blacks
Try: Chouzenoux 22' m Pélissié 46' m Pen: Ramos (1/1) 15'; Ntamack (2/2) 61', 68'	Report	Try: Wainui 43' m Penalty try 71'; Pen: Garden-Bachop (1/1) 11'

Stade Chaban-Delmas, Bordeaux
Attendance: 30,000
Referee: Shuhei Kubo (Japan)

Team details

FB	15	(France) Thomas Ramos		(substituted off) 40'
RW	14	(France) Bastien Pourailly
OC	13	(France) Aurélien Rougerie (c)
IC	12	(France) Pierre Aguillon		(substituted off) 65'
LW	11	(France) Jean-Baptiste Dubie
FH	10	(France) Romain Ntamack
SH	9	(France) Baptiste Couilloud		(substituted off) 61'
N8	8	(France) Martin Devergie
OF	7	(France) Baptiste Chouzenoux		(substituted off) 42'
BF	6	(France) Mahamadou Diaby		(substituted off) 61'
RL	5	(France) Alexandre Flanquart				(substituted off) 78'
LL	4	(France) Swan Rebbadj			(substituted off) 74'	(substituted on) 78'
TP	3	(France) Cedate Gomes Sa		(substituted off) 63'
HK	2	(France) Adrien Pélissié		(substituted off) 55'
LP	1	(France) Sébastien Taofifénua		(substituted off) 61'	(substituted on) 74'
Replacements:
HK	16	(France) Anthony Etrillard		(substituted on) 55'
PR	17	(France) Antoine Tichit	(yellow card) 71' to 80'	(substituted on) 61'
PR	18	(France) Emerick Setiano		(substituted on) 63'
LK	19	(France) Florian Verhaeghe		(substituted on) 61'
FL	20	(France) Mathieu Babillot		(substituted on) 42'
SH	21	(France) Teddy Iribaren		(substituted on) 61'
FH	22	(France) Matthieu Jalibert		(substituted on) 40'
FB	23	(France) Louis Dupichot		(substituted on) 65'
Coach:
(France) Frank Azema

FB	15	Charlie Ngatai
RW	14	Sean Wainui
OC	13	Tim Bateman
IC	12	Rob Thompson		(substituted off) 40'
LW	11	Shaun Stevenson
FH	10	Jackson Garden-Bachop		(substituted off) 61'
SH	9	Brad Weber		(substituted off) 48'
N8	8	Akira Ioane
OF	7	Sam Henwood		(substituted off) 50'
BF	6	Tom Franklin
RL	5	Keepa Mewett		(substituted off) 55'
LL	4	Jackson Hemopo
TP	3	Marcel Renata		(substituted off) 40'
HK	2	Ash Dixon (c)		(substituted off) 61'
LP	1	Chris Eves		(substituted off) 50'
Replacements:
HK	16	Liam Polwart		(substituted on) 61'
PR	17	Ross Wright		(substituted on) 50'
PR	18	Tyrel Lomax		(substituted on) 40'
FL	19	Jordan Manihera	(yellow card) 55' to 65'	(substituted on) 55'
FL	20	Dan Pryor		(substituted on) 50'
SH	21	Jonathan Ruru		(substituted on) 48'
FH	22	Ihaia West		(substituted on) 61'
CE	23	Teihorangi Walden		(substituted on) 40'
Coach:
(New Zealand) Clayton McMillan

Touch judges:
FFR appointment (France)
FFR appointment (France)
Television match official:
FFR appointment (France)

11 November 2017
18:00 GET (UTC+4)

Georgia	54–22	Canada
Try: Matiashvili (2) 1' c, 68' c Nemsadze 40' c Chilachava 51' c Sharikadze 57' c Asieshvili 77' c Con: Matiashvili (6/6) 3', 40', 53', 58', 69', 79'; Pen: Matiashvili (4/4) 9', 14', 24', 44'	Report	Try: Paris 33' m Van der Merwe 55' c Staller 60' c Con: Staller (2/3) 56', 60'; Pen: Staller (1/1) 7'

Dinamo Arena, Tbilisi
Attendance: 25,000
Referee: Ben Whitehouse (Wales)

Team details

FB	15	Soso Matiashvili
RW	14	Giorgi Koshadze
OC	13	Davit Kacharava	(substituted off) 73'
IC	12	Merab Sharikadze (c)
LW	11	Mirian Modebadze
FH	10	Lasha Khmaladze	(substituted off) 70'
SH	9	Vasil Lobzhanidze	(substituted off) 62'
N8	8	Beka Bitsadze
OF	7	Viktor Kolelishvili	(substituted off) 59'
BF	6	Lasha Lomidze
RL	5	Giorgi Nemsadze
LL	4	Konstantin Mikautadze	(substituted off) 53'
TP	3	Levan Chilachava	(substituted off) 65'
HK	2	Jaba Bregvadze	(substituted off) 65'
LP	1	Mikheil Nariashvili	(substituted off) 50'
Replacements:
HK	16	Shalva Mamukashvili	(substituted on) 65'
PR	17	Karlen Asieshvili	(substituted on) 50'
PR	18	Soso Bekoshvili	(substituted on) 65'
LK	19	Giorgi Chkhaidze	(substituted on) 53'
FL	20	Giorgi Tkhilaishvili	(substituted on) 62'
SH	21	Giorgi Begadze	(substituted on) 62'
FH	22	Revaz Jinchvelashvili	(substituted on) 70'
CE	23	Giorgi Kveseladze	(substituted on) 73'
Coach:
(New Zealand) Milton Haig

FB	15	Andrew Coe
RW	14	Brock Staller
OC	13	D. T. H. van der Merwe
IC	12	Ciaran Hearn	(substituted off) 62'
LW	11	Taylor Paris
FH	10	Pat Parfrey
SH	9	Phil Mack (c)
N8	8	Tyler Ardron
OF	7	Matt Heaton
BF	6	Lucas Rumball	(substituted off) 24'
RL	5	Evan Olmstead	(substituted off) 70'
LL	4	Josh Larsen
TP	3	Jake Ilnicki	(substituted off) 55'
HK	2	Ray Barkwill	(substituted off) 55'
LP	1	Djustice Sears-Duru	(substituted off) 55'
Replacements:
HK	16	Eric Howard	(substituted on) 55'
PR	17	Anthony Luca	(substituted on) 55'
PR	18	Cole Keith	(substituted on) 55'
LK	19	Kyle Baillie	(substituted on) 70'
LK	20	Conor Keys
FL	21	Kyle Gilmour	(substituted on) 24'
SH	22	Andrew Ferguson
CE	23	Giuseppe du Toit	(substituted on) 62'
Coach:
(Wales) Kingsley Jones

Man of the Match:
Soso Matiashvili (Georgia)

Touch judges:
Alexandre Ruiz (France)
Craig Evans (Wales)
Television match official:
Neil Hennessy (Wales)

Notes:

- Giorgi Kveseladze, Mirian Modebadze (both Georgia) and Josh Larsen (Canada) made their international debuts.
- This was Georgia largest winning margin over Canada.

11 November 2017
15:00 CET (UTC+1)

Germany	45–12	Brazil
Try: Coetzee 5' m Füchsel 12' c Otto 23' c Schramm (2) 34' c, 43' c Klewinghaus 49' m Barber 62' c Con: Parkinson (5/7) 14', 24', 36', 44', 63'	Report	Try: F. Sancery 55' c Arruda 76' m Con: Reeves (1/2) 57'

Bruno-Plache-Stadion, Leipzig
Attendance: 2,668
Referee: David Wilkinson (Ireland)

Team details

FB	15	Marcel Coetzee
RW	14	Nikolai Klewinghaus
OC	13	Mathieu Ducau	(substituted off) 70'
IC	12	Wynston Cameron-Dow
LW	11	Pierre Mathurin
FH	10	Raynor Parkinson
SH	9	Sean Armstrong (c)	(substituted off) 47'
N8	8	Ayron Schramm
OF	7	Jaco Otto	(substituted off) 49'
BF	6	Sebastian Ferreira	(substituted off) 50'
RL	5	Erik Marks
LL	4	Michael Poppmeier
TP	3	Samy Füchsel	(substituted off) 65'
HK	2	Dasch Barber	(substituted off) 72'
LP	1	Jörn Schröder	(substituted off) 49'
Replacements:
HK	16	Gilles Valette	(substituted on) 72'
PR	17	Anthony Dickinson	(substituted on) 65'
PR	18	Julius Nostadt	(substituted on) 49'
N8	19	Jarrid Els	(substituted on) 49'
LK	20	Marcel Henn	(substituted on) 50'
SH	21	Tim Menzel	(substituted on) 47'
CE	22	Jamie Murphy	(substituted on) 70'
WG	23	Steffen Liebig
Coach:
(South Africa) Kobus Potgieter

FB	15	Daniel Sancery
RW	14	Lucas Tranquez		(substituted off) 72'
OC	13	Felipe Sancery
IC	12	De Wet van Niekerk
LW	11	Stefano Giantorno		(substituted off) 70'
FH	10	Josh Reeves
SH	9	Douglas Rauth		(substituted off) 71'
N8	8	André Arruda
OF	7	Cléber Dias
BF	6	Artur Bergo		(substituted off) 55'
RL	5	Gabriel Paganini
LL	4	Lucas Piero	(yellow card) 3' to 13'	(substituted off) 47'	(substituted on) 52'
TP	3	Caíque Silva		(substituted off) 52'
HK	2	Yan Rosetti (c)	(yellow card) 42' to 52'		(substituted off) 52'
LP	1	Lucas Abud		(substituted off) 38'
Replacements:
HK	16	Endy Willian		(substituted on) 47'
PR	17	Matheus Rocha		(substituted on) 38'
PR	18	Michel Gomes		(substituted on) 52'
N8	19	Mauricio Canterle
FL	20	Matheus Daniel		(substituted on) 55'
SH	21	Matheus Cruz		(substituted on) 71'
CE	22	Moisés Duque		(substituted on) 72'
WG	23	Lucas Muller		(substituted on) 70'
Coach:
(Argentina) Rodolfo Ambrosio

Touch judges:
Nigel Correll (Ireland)
Oisin Quinn (Ireland)

11 November 2017
15:00 CET (UTC+1)

Italy	19–10	Fiji
Try: Ferrari 27' c Con: Canna (1/1) 28'; Pen: Canna (3/3) 4', 52', 57'; McKinley (1/1) 79'	Report	Try: Nakarawa 38' c Con: Volavola (1/1) 39'; Pen: Volavola (1/2) 20'

Stadio Angelo Massimino, Catania
Attendance: 12,343
Referee: John Lacey (Ireland)

Team details

FB	15	Jayden Hayward
RW	14	Leonardo Sarto
OC	13	Tommaso Boni
IC	12	Tommaso Castello	20' to 26'
LW	11	Mattia Bellini
FH	10	Carlo Canna	(substituted off) 61'
SH	9	Marcello Violi	(substituted off) 68'
N8	8	Sergio Parisse (c)
OF	7	Braam Steyn
BF	6	Francesco Minto	(substituted off) 57'
RL	5	Dean Budd
LL	4	Marco Fuser	(substituted off) 68'
TP	3	Simone Ferrari	(substituted off) 46'
HK	2	Luca Bigi	(substituted off) 46'
LP	1	Andrea Lovotti	5' to 6'		25' to 26'		(substituted off) 50'
Replacements:
HK	16	Leonardo Ghiraldini	(substituted on) 46'
PR	17	Federico Zani	(substituted on) 5'	(substituted off) 6'	(substituted on) 25'	(substituted off) 26'	(substituted on) 50'
PR	18	Dario Chistolini	(substituted on) 46'
LK	19	Marco Lazzaroni	(substituted on) 68'
FL	20	Giovanni Licata	(substituted on) 57'
SH	21	Edoardo Gori	(substituted on) 68'
FH	22	Ian McKinley	(substituted on) 61'
FB	23	Matteo Minozzi	(substituted on) 20'	(substituted off) 26'
Coach:
(Ireland) Conor O'Shea

FB	15	Kini Murimurivalu
RW	14	Josua Tuisova
OC	13	Asaeli Tikoirotuma
IC	12	Jale Vatubua		(substituted off) 51'
LW	11	Timoci Nagusa		(substituted off) 75'
FH	10	Ben Volavola	(yellow card) 63' to 73'
SH	9	Frank Lomani		(substituted off) 51'
N8	8	Nemani Nagusa		(substituted off) 67'
OF	7	Akapusi Qera (c)
BF	6	Semi Kunatani
RL	5	Leone Nakarawa
LL	4	Api Ratuniyarawa		(substituted off) 67'
TP	3	Manasa Saulo		(substituted off) 66'
HK	2	Talemaitoga Tuapati		(substituted off) 53'
LP	1	Campese Ma'afu		(substituted off) 53'
Replacements:
HK	16	Sunia Koto		(substituted on) 53'
PR	17	Peni Ravai		(substituted on) 53'
PR	18	Ropate Rinakama		(substituted on) 66'
LK	19	Sikeli Nabou		(substituted on) 67'
FL	20	Mosese Voka		(substituted on) 67'
SH	21	Henry Seniloli		(substituted on) 51'
CE	22	Levani Botia		(substituted on) 51'
WG	23	Vereniki Goneva		(substituted on) 75'
Coach:
(New Zealand) John McKee

Man of the Match:
Dean Budd (Italy)

Touch judges:
Brendon Pickerill (New Zealand)
Pierre Brousset (France)
Television match official:
Neil Paterson (Scotland)

Notes:

- Jayden Hayward, Giovanni Licata, Ian McKinley, Matteo Minozzi (all Italy), Semi Kunatani and Ropate Rinakama (both Fiji) made their international debuts.

11 November 2017
14:30 GMT (UTC+0)

Scotland	44–38	Samoa
Try: Hogg 1' c H. Jones 34' m McInally (2) 40' c, 45' c Dunbar 65' m Horne 73' c Con: Russell (3/5) 2', 40', 46'; Horne (1/1) 75'; Pen: Russell (2/2) 14', 24'	Report	Try: Tyrell 27' c Faʻasalele 49' c Nanai-Williams 62' c Fonotia 67' c Treviranus 76' c Con: Nanai-Williams (5/5) 27', 50', 63', 68', 77'; Pen: Nanai-Williams (1/2) 11'

Murrayfield Stadium, Edinburgh
Attendance: 67,144
Referee: Nic Berry (Australia)

Team details

FB	15	Stuart Hogg
RW	14	Tommy Seymour	(substituted off) 58'
OC	13	Huw Jones
IC	12	Alex Dunbar
LW	11	Lee Jones
FH	10	Finn Russell	(substituted off) 65'
SH	9	Ali Price	(substituted off) 65'
N8	8	Ryan Wilson
OF	7	Hamish Watson
BF	6	John Barclay (c)	(substituted off) 58'
RL	5	Jonny Gray
LL	4	Ben Toolis	(substituted off) 71'
TP	3	WP Nel	(substituted off) 31'
HK	2	Stuart McInally	(substituted off) 58'
LP	1	Darryl Marfo	(substituted off) 58'
Replacements:
HK	16	George Turner	(substituted on) 58'
PR	17	Jamie Bhatti	(substituted on) 58'
PR	18	Zander Fagerson	(substituted on) 31'
LK	19	Tim Swinson	(substituted on) 71'
N8	20	Cornell du Preez	(substituted on) 58'
SH	21	Henry Pyrgos	(substituted on) 65'
FH	22	Peter Horne	(substituted on) 65'
CE	23	Chris Harris	(substituted on) 58'
Coach:
(Scotland) Gregor Townsend

FB	15	Ahsee Tuala	(substituted off) 74'
RW	14	Paul Perez
OC	13	Kieron Fonotia
IC	12	Rey Lee-Lo	(substituted off) 69'
LW	11	David Lemi
FH	10	Tim Nanai-Williams
SH	9	Pele Cowley	(substituted off) 50'
N8	8	Jack Lam
OF	7	TJ Ioane	(substituted off) 61'
BF	6	Piula Faʻasalele
RL	5	Chris Vui (c)
LL	4	Josh Tyrell	(substituted off) 71'
TP	3	Donald Brighouse	(substituted off) 51'
HK	2	Manu Leiataua	(substituted off) 56'
LP	1	Jordan Lay	(substituted off) 58'
Replacements:
HK	16	Motu Matu'u	(substituted on) 56'
PR	17	James Lay	(substituted on) 58'
PR	18	Hisa Sasagi	(substituted on) 51'
LK	19	Fa'atiga Lemalu	(substituted on) 71'
FL	20	Ofisa Treviranus	(substituted on) 61'
SH	21	Melani Matavao	(substituted on) 50'
FH	22	AJ Alatimu	(substituted on) 74'
CE	23	Alapati Leiua	(substituted on) 69'
Coach:
(Samoa) Titimaea Tafua

Man of the Match:
Stuart McInally (Scotland)

Touch judges:
Paul Williams (New Zealand)
George Clancy (Ireland)
Television match official:
Simon McDowell (Ireland)

Notes:

- Jamie Bhatti, Darryl Marfo, Chris Harris, George Turner (all Scotland), AJ Alatimu, Donald Brighouse, Melani Matavao and Josh Tyrell (all Samoa) made their international debut.

11 November 2017
15:00 GMT (UTC+0)

England	21–8	Argentina
Try: Hughes 22' m Rokoduguni 65' c Con: Ford (1/2) 67'; Pen: Ford (3/4) 6', 13', 33'	Report	Try: Sánchez 77' m Pen: Boffelli (1/2) 9'

Twickenham Stadium, London
Attendance: 81,683
Referee: Marius van der Westhuizen (South Africa)

Team details

FB	15	Mike Brown	(substituted off) 21'
RW	14	Anthony Watson
OC	13	Jonathan Joseph	(substituted off) 61'
IC	12	Henry Slade
LW	11	Elliot Daly
FH	10	George Ford
SH	9	Ben Youngs	(substituted off) 61'
N8	8	Nathan Hughes	(substituted off) 70'
OF	7	Sam Underhill
BF	6	Chris Robshaw
RL	5	George Kruis	(substituted off) 56'
LL	4	Courtney Lawes
TP	3	Dan Cole	(substituted off) 67'
HK	2	Dylan Hartley (c)	(substituted off) 58'
LP	1	Mako Vunipola	(substituted off) 67'
Replacements:
HK	16	Jamie George	(substituted on) 58'
PR	17	Ellis Genge	(substituted on) 67'
PR	18	Harry Williams	(substituted on) 67'
LK	19	Joe Launchbury	(substituted on) 56'
FL	20	Sam Simmonds	(substituted on) 70'
SH	21	Danny Care	(substituted on) 61'
FH	22	Alex Lozowski	(substituted on) 61'
WG	23	Semesa Rokoduguni	(substituted on) 21'
Coach:
(Australia) Eddie Jones

FB	15	Joaquín Tuculet
RW	14	Ramiro Moyano	(substituted off) 54'
OC	13	Matías Moroni
IC	12	Santiago González Iglesias
LW	11	Emiliano Boffelli
FH	10	Juan Martín Hernández	(substituted off) 63'
SH	9	Martín Landajo	(substituted off) 67'
N8	8	Tomás Lezana	(substituted off) 56'
OF	7	Marcos Kremer
BF	6	Pablo Matera
RL	5	Tomás Lavanini	(substituted off) 67'
LL	4	Matías Alemanno
TP	3	Nahuel Tetaz Chaparro	(substituted off) 58'
HK	2	Agustín Creevy (c)	(substituted off) 67'
LP	1	Santiago García Botta	(substituted off) 58'
Replacements:
HK	16	Julián Montoya	(substituted on) 67'
PR	17	Lucas Noguera Paz	(substituted on) 58'
PR	18	Enrique Pieretto	(substituted on) 58'
N8	19	Benjamín Macome	(substituted on) 56'
N8	20	Leonardo Senatore	(substituted on) 67'
SH	21	Gonzalo Bertranou	(substituted on) 67'
FH	22	Nicolás Sánchez	(substituted on) 63'
WG	23	Sebastián Cancelliere	(substituted on) 54'
Coach:
(Argentina) Daniel Hourcade

Man of the Match:
Mako Vunipola (England)

Touch judges:
Nigel Owens (Wales)
Dan Jones (Wales)
Television match official:
Olly Hodges (Ireland)

Notes:

- Sam Simmonds (England) and Sebastian Cancelliere (Argentina) made their international debuts.

11 November 2017
17:15 GMT (UTC+0)

Wales	21–29	Australia
Try: S. Evans 16' c Amos 79' m Con: Halfpenny (1/2) 18'; Pen: Halfpenny (3/4) 8', 37', 51'	Report	Try: Polota-Nau 12' c Coleman 21' c Hooper 40' m Beale 62' c Con: Foley (3/4) 13', 23', 63'; Pen: Hodge (1/1) 33'

Millennium Stadium, Cardiff
Attendance: 70,275
Referee: Glen Jackson (New Zealand)

Team details

FB	15	Leigh Halfpenny
RW	14	Liam Williams
OC	13	Jonathan Davies
IC	12	Owen Williams	(substituted off) 68'
LW	11	Steff Evans	(substituted off) 64'
FH	10	Dan Biggar
SH	9	Gareth Davies	(substituted off) 75'
N8	8	Taulupe Faletau
OF	7	Josh Navidi
BF	6	Aaron Shingler	(substituted off) 74'
RL	5	Alun Wyn Jones (c)
LL	4	Jake Ball	(substituted off) 68'
TP	3	Tomas Francis	(substituted off) 74'
HK	2	Ken Owens	(substituted off) 74'
LP	1	Rob Evans	(substituted off) 68'
Replacements:
HK	16	Kristian Dacey	(substituted on) 74'
PR	17	Nicky Smith	(substituted on) 68'
PR	18	Leon Brown	(substituted on) 74'
LK	19	Cory Hill	(substituted on) 68'
FL	20	Sam Cross	(substituted on) 74'
SH	21	Aled Davies	(substituted on) 75'
CE	22	Owen Watkin	(substituted on) 68'
WG	23	Hallam Amos	(substituted on) 64'
Coach:
(New Zealand) Warren Gatland

FB	15	Kurtley Beale
RW	14	Marika Koroibete
OC	13	Tevita Kuridrani
IC	12	Samu Kerevi		(substituted off) 52'
LW	11	Reece Hodge
FH	10	Bernard Foley
SH	9	Will Genia
N8	8	Sean McMahon
OF	7	Michael Hooper (c)	(yellow card) 67' to 77'
BF	6	Ned Hanigan		(substituted off) 63'
RL	5	Adam Coleman
LL	4	Rob Simmons		(substituted off) 63'
TP	3	Sekope Kepu		(substituted off) 64'
HK	2	Tatafu Polota-Nau		(substituted off) 58'
LP	1	Scott Sio		(substituted off) 68'
Replacements:
HK	16	Stephen Moore		(substituted on) 58'
PR	17	Tom Robertson		(substituted on) 68'
PR	18	Allan Alaalatoa		(substituted on) 64'
LK	19	Matt Philip		(substituted on) 63'
N8	20	Ben McCalman		(substituted on) 63'
SH	21	Nick Phipps
FB	22	Karmichael Hunt		(substituted on) 52'
WG	23	Henry Speight
Coach:
(Australia) Michael Cheika

Man of the Match:
Will Genia (Australia)

Touch judges:
Jaco Peyper (South Africa)
Ian Tempest (England)
Television match official:
Graham Hughes (England)

Notes:

- Leon Brown, Sam Cross and Owen Watkin (all Wales) made their international debuts.
- Australia retained the James Bevan Trophy.

11 November 2017
17:30 GMT (UTC+0)

Ireland	38–3	South Africa
Try: Conway 24' m Ruddock 70' c Herring 75' c Stockdale 80' c Con: Sexton (1/2) 72'; Carbery (2/2) 77', 80'; Pen: Sexton (4/4) 3', 14', 19', 56'	Report	Pen: Jantjies (1/1) 43'

Aviva Stadium, Dublin
Attendance: 51,000
Referee: Ben O'Keeffe (New Zealand)

Team details

FB	15	Rob Kearney	(substituted off) 73'
RW	14	Andrew Conway
OC	13	Robbie Henshaw
IC	12	Bundee Aki
LW	11	Jacob Stockdale
FH	10	Johnny Sexton	(substituted off) 74'
SH	9	Conor Murray	(substituted off) 70'
N8	8	CJ Stander
OF	7	Seán O'Brien
BF	6	Peter O'Mahony	(substituted off) 50'
RL	5	Devin Toner
LL	4	Iain Henderson	(substituted off) 70'
TP	3	Tadhg Furlong	(substituted off) 70'
HK	2	Rory Best (c)	(substituted off) 66'
LP	1	Cian Healy	(substituted off) 66'
Replacements:
HK	16	Rob Herring	(substituted on) 66'
PR	17	Dave Kilcoyne	(substituted on) 66'
PR	18	John Ryan	(substituted on) 70'
LK	19	James Ryan	(substituted on) 70'
FL	20	Rhys Ruddock	(substituted on) 50'
SH	21	Kieran Marmion	(substituted on) 70'
FB	22	Joey Carbery	(substituted on) 74'
WG	23	Darren Sweetnam	(substituted on) 73'
Coach:
(New Zealand) Joe Schmidt

FB	15	Andries Coetzee
RW	14	Dillyn Leyds
OC	13	Jesse Kriel
IC	12	Damian de Allende	(substituted off) 56'
LW	11	Courtnall Skosan
FH	10	Elton Jantjies	(substituted off) 56'
SH	9	Ross Cronjé	(substituted off) 68'
N8	8	Francois Louw
OF	7	Pieter-Steph du Toit	(substituted off) 74'
BF	6	Siya Kolisi	(substituted off) 68'	(substituted on) 74'
RL	5	Lood de Jager	(substituted off) 66'
LL	4	Eben Etzebeth (c)
TP	3	Coenie Oosthuizen	(substituted off) 1'
HK	2	Malcolm Marx	(substituted off) 68'
LP	1	Tendai Mtawarira	(substituted off) 53'
Replacements:
HK	16	Bongi Mbonambi	(substituted on) 68'
PR	17	Steven Kitshoff	(substituted on) 53'
PR	18	Wilco Louw	(substituted on) 1'
LK	19	Franco Mostert	(substituted on) 66'
N8	20	Uzair Cassiem	(substituted on) 68'
SH	21	Rudy Paige	(substituted on) 68'
FH	22	Handré Pollard	(substituted on) 56'
CE	23	Francois Venter	(substituted on) 56'
Coach:
(South Africa) Allister Coetzee

Man of the Match:
Johnny Sexton (Ireland)

Touch judges:
Wayne Barnes (England)
Ian Davies (Wales)
Television match official:
Rowan Kitt (England)

Notes:

- Bundee Aki and Darren Sweetnam (both Ireland) made their international debuts.
- Seán O'Brien (Ireland) earned his 50th test cap.
- This was Ireland's largest winning margin over South Africa, surpassing the 17-point margin set in 2006.

11 November 2017
20:45 CET (UTC+1)

France	18–38	New Zealand
Try: Thomas 26' m Penalty try 46'; Pen: Belleau (2/2) 41', 51'	Report	Try: Coles 8' c Naholo (2) 21' c, 79' c Crotty 35' c Cane 38' c Con: Barrett (5/5) 9', 23', 37', 40', 80'; Pen: Barrett (1/1) 16'

Stade de France, Saint-Denis
Attendance: 78,561
Referee: Angus Gardner (Australia)

Team details

FB	15	Nans Ducuing		(substituted off) 74'
RW	14	Teddy Thomas
OC	13	Mathieu Bastareaud
IC	12	Geoffrey Doumayrou		(substituted off) 62'
LW	11	Yoann Huget
FH	10	Anthony Belleau
SH	9	Antoine Dupont		(substituted off) 72'
N8	8	Louis Picamoles		(substituted off) 66'
OF	7	Kevin Gourdon
BF	6	Judicaël Cancoriet
RL	5	Paul Gabrillagues		(substituted off) 61'
LL	4	Sébastien Vahaamahina
TP	3	Rabah Slimani	(yellow card) 33' to 43'	(substituted off) 61'
HK	2	Guilhem Guirado (c)		(substituted off) 69'
LP	1	Jefferson Poirot		(substituted off) 34'	(substituted on) 40'	(substituted off) 66'
Replacements:
HK	16	Clément Maynadier		(substituted on) 69'
PR	17	Raphaël Chaume		(substituted on) 34'	(substituted off) 40'	(substituted on) 66'
PR	18	Daniel Kotze		(substituted on) 61'
LK	19	Paul Jedrasiak		(substituted on) 61'
FL	20	Anthony Jelonch		(substituted on) 66'
SH	21	Baptiste Serin		(substituted on) 72'
FH	22	François Trinh-Duc		(substituted on) 74'
CE	23	Damian Penaud		(substituted on) 62'
Coach:
(France) Guy Novès

FB	15	Damian McKenzie		(substituted off) 65'
RW	14	Waisake Naholo
OC	13	Ryan Crotty		(substituted off) 64'
IC	12	Sonny Bill Williams	(yellow card) 47' to 57'
LW	11	Rieko Ioane
FH	10	Beauden Barrett
SH	9	Aaron Smith		(substituted off) 68'
N8	8	Kieran Read (c)		(substituted off) 47'
OF	7	Sam Cane
BF	6	Vaea Fifita
RL	5	Sam Whitelock
LL	4	Luke Romano		29' to 37'		(substituted off) 64'
TP	3	Nepo Laulala		(substituted off) 60'
HK	2	Dane Coles		(substituted off) 23'
LP	1	Kane Hames		(substituted off) 47'
Replacements:
HK	16	Codie Taylor		(substituted on) 23'
PR	17	Wyatt Crockett		(substituted on) 47'
PR	18	Ofa Tu'ungafasi		(substituted on) 60'
LK	19	Scott Barrett		(substituted on) 29'	(substituted off) 37'	(substituted on) 64'
FL	20	Matt Todd		(substituted on) 47'
SH	21	TJ Perenara		(substituted on) 68'
FH	22	Lima Sopoaga		(substituted on) 65'
CE	23	Anton Lienert-Brown		(substituted on) 64'
Coach:
(New Zealand) Steve Hansen

Man of the Match:
Waisake Naholo (New Zealand)

Touch judges:
Matthew Carley (England)
Tom Foley (England)
Television match official:
David Grashoff (England)

Notes:

- Anthony Belleau, Judicaël Cancoriet, Raphael Chaume, Geoffrey Doumayrou, Paul Gabrillagues and Anthony Jelonch (all France) made their international debuts.
- Yoann Huget (France) earned his 50th test cap.
- New Zealand retain the Dave Gallaher Trophy.

=== 14 November ===
14 November 2017
19:30 CET (UTC+1)

France XV	23–28	New Zealand XV
Try: Lacroix (2) 15' c, 27' m Chavancy 72' m Con: Trinh-Duc (1/2) 16'; Pen: Trinh-Duc (1/1) 35'; Plisson (1/1) 60'	Report	Try: Squire 10' c Duffie 23' c Tuipulotu 51' c Laumape 55' c Con: Sopoaga (3/3) 11', 24', 52'; Mo'unga (1/1) 56'

Parc Olympique Lyonnais, Lyon
Attendance: 58,607
Referee: Luke Pearce (England)

Team details

FB	15	Scott Spedding
RW	14	Gabriel Lacroix	(substituted off) 66'
OC	13	Henry Chavancy
IC	12	Jonathan Danty	(substituted off) 25'	(substituted on) 35'	(substituted off) 54'
LW	11	Hugo Bonneval
FH	10	François Trinh-Duc	(substituted off) 58'
SH	9	Yann Lesgourgues
N8	8	Marco Tauleigne	(substituted off) 13'
OF	7	Sekou Macalou
BF	6	Wenceslas Lauret
RL	5	Romain Taofifénua	(substituted off) 52'
LL	4	Yoann Maestri (c)
TP	3	Malik Hamadache	(substituted off) 57'
HK	2	Camille Chat	(substituted off) 57'	(substituted on) 63'	(substituted off) 70'
LP	1	Dany Priso	(substituted off) 52'
Replacements:
HK	16	Christopher Tolofua	(substituted on) 57'
PR	17	Cedate Gomes Sa	(substituted on) 57'
PR	18	Lucas Pointud	(substituted on) 52'
LK	19	Julien Le Devedec	(substituted on) 52'
FL	20	Fabien Sanconnie	(substituted on) 13'	63' to 70'
SH	21	Maxime Machenaud	(substituted on) 66'
FH	22	Jules Plisson	(substituted on) 58'
WG	23	Vincent Rattez	(substituted on) 25'	(substituted off) 35'	(substituted on) 54'
Coach:
(France) Guy Novès

FB	15	David Havili
RW	14	Matt Duffie
OC	13	Jack Goodhue	(yellow card) 68' to 78'
IC	12	Ngani Laumape
LW	11	Seta Tamanivalu
FH	10	Lima Sopoaga		(substituted off) 52'
SH	9	Tawera Kerr-Barlow		(substituted off) 70'
N8	8	Luke Whitelock (c)
OF	7	Ardie Savea		(substituted off) 70'
BF	6	Liam Squire		(substituted off) 52'
RL	5	Dominic Bird
LL	4	Patrick Tuipulotu		(substituted off) 66'
TP	3	Jeffery Toomaga-Allen		(substituted off) 66'
HK	2	Nathan Harris		(substituted off) 66'
LP	1	Tim Perry		(substituted off) 57'
Replacements:
HK	16	Asafo Aumua		(substituted on) 66'
PR	17	Atunaisa Moli		(substituted on) 57'
PR	18	Ofa Tu'ungafasi		(substituted on) 66'
LK	19	Scott Barrett		(substituted on) 66'
FL	20	Akira Ioane		(substituted on) 52'
FL	21	Dillon Hunt		(substituted on) 70'
SH	22	Mitchell Drummond		(substituted on) 70'
FH	23	Richie Mo'unga		(substituted on) 52'
Coach:
(New Zealand) Steve Hansen

Man of the Match:
Gabriel Lacroix (France XV)

Touch judges:
Andrew Brace (Ireland)
David Wilkinson (Ireland)
Television match official:
Sean Davey3,000 (England)

=== 18 November ===
18 November 2017
15:00 CET (UTC+1)

Belgium	19–23	Brazil
Try: Torfs 18' c Dowsett (2) 45' c, 80' m Con: Piron (1/1) 19'; Hart (1/2) 46'; Pen: Piron (0/1)	Report	Try: Dias 54' m F. Sancery 58' m Van Niekerk 72'; Con: Reeves (1/3) 73'; Pen: Reeves (2/3) 24', 64'

King Baudouin Stadium (Annex 2), Brussels
Attendance: 3,000
Referee: Craig Maxwell-Keys (England)

Team details

FB	15	Florian Piron	(substituted off) 40'
RW	14	Marc Tchangue	(substituted off) 60'
OC	13	Guillaume Piron
IC	12	Jens Torfs (c)	(substituted off) 60'
LW	11	Craig Dowsett
FH	10	Vincent Hart
SH	9	Isaac Montoisy
N8	8	Nick Cording
OF	7	Amin Hamzaoui
BF	6	Gillian Benoy	(substituted off) 60'
RL	5	Sven D’Hooghe
LL	4	Bertrand Billi	(substituted off) 50'
TP	3	Maxime Jadot	(substituted off) 66'
HK	2	Thomas Dienst	(substituted off) 70'
LP	1	James Pearse	(substituted off) 50'
Replacements:
HK	16	Gianni Vercammen	(substituted on) 70'
PR	17	Sep de Backer	(substituted on) 50'
LK	18	Tuur Moelants	(substituted on) 50'
FL	19	Maxime Temmerman	(substituted on) 60'
SH	20	Louis Debatty	(substituted on) 60'
WG	21	Thomas Brouillard	(substituted on) 40'
FH	22	Kevin Williams	(substituted on) 60'
PR	23	Romain Pinte	(substituted on) 66'
Coach:
(Belgium) Guillaume Ajac

FB	15	Daniel Sancery
RW	14	Lucas Muller	(substituted off) 71'
OC	13	Felipe Sancery
IC	12	Moisés Duque
LW	11	De Wet van Niekerk
FH	10	Josh Reeves
SH	9	Matheus Cruz	(substituted off) 14'
N8	8	Alexandre Alves	(substituted off) 44'
OF	7	André Arruda
BF	6	Artur Bergo
RL	5	Cléber Dias
LL	4	Lucas Piero
TP	3	Pedro Bengaló	(substituted off) 55'
HK	2	Yan Rosetti (c)
LP	1	Lucas Abud	(substituted off) 78'
Replacements:
HK	16	Endy Willian
PR	17	Michel Gomes	(substituted on) 78'
PR	18	Caíque Silva	(substituted on) 55'
N8	19	Mauricio Canterle
FL	20	Matheus Daniel	(substituted on) 44'
SH	21	Will Broderick	(substituted on) 14'
FH	22	Leonardo Ceccarelli
WG	23	Lucas Tranquez	(substituted on) 71'
Coach:
(Argentina) Rodolfo Ambrosio

Touch judges:
Jamie Leahy (England)
Lionel Spooner (England).

Notes:

- Nick Cording, Amin Hamzaoui, Vincent Hart (all Belgium) and Will Broderick (Brazil) made their international debuts.
- This was the first meeting between the two nations.
- This was Brazil's first victory on in Europe.

18 November 2017
15:00 CET (UTC+1)

Italy	15–31	Argentina
Pen: Canna (4/4) 12', 20', 32', 48'; Drop: Violi (1/1) 56'	Report	Try: Cancelliere 26' m Kremer 68' c Tuculet 76' c Con: Sánchez (2/3) 69', 77'; Pen: Hernández (1/1) 11'; Sánchez (3/3) 45', 53', 59'

Stadio Artemio Franchi, Florence
Attendance: 21,874
Referee: Jaco Peyper (South Africa)

Team details

FB	15	Jayden Hayward
RW	14	Leonardo Sarto	(substituted off) 51'
OC	13	Tommaso Boni
IC	12	Tommaso Castello
LW	11	Mattia Bellini
FH	10	Carlo Canna	(substituted off) 71'
SH	9	Marcello Violi	(substituted off) 59'
N8	8	Sergio Parisse (c)
OF	7	Braam Steyn
BF	6	Francesco Minto	(substituted off) 61'
RL	5	Dean Budd	(substituted off) 71'
LL	4	Marco Fuser
TP	3	Simone Ferrari	(substituted off) 59'
HK	2	Luca Bigi	(substituted off) 40'	(substituted on) 74'
LP	1	Andrea Lovotti	(substituted off) 51'
Replacements:
HK	16	Leonardo Ghiraldini	(substituted on) 40'	(substituted off) 74'
PR	17	Federico Zani	(substituted on) 51'
PR	18	Dario Chistolini	(substituted on) 59'
LK	19	Federico Ruzza	(substituted on) 71'
FL	20	Giovanni Licata	(substituted on) 61'
SH	21	Tito Tebaldi	(substituted on) 59'
FH	22	Ian McKinley	(substituted on) 71'
FB	23	Matteo Minozzi	(substituted on) 51'
Coach:
(Ireland) Conor O'Shea

FB	15	Joaquín Tuculet
RW	14	Sebastián Cancelliere
OC	13	Matías Orlando	(substituted off) 57'
IC	12	Santiago González Iglesias
LW	11	Emiliano Boffelli
FH	10	Nicolás Sánchez	(substituted off) 5'	(substituted on) 15'
SH	9	Martín Landajo	(substituted off) 59'
N8	8	Juan Manuel Leguizamón	(substituted off) 57'
OF	7	Marcos Kremer
BF	6	Pablo Matera
RL	5	Tomás Lavanini
LL	4	Matías Alemanno	(substituted off) 51'
TP	3	Nahuel Tetaz Chaparro	(substituted off) 62'
HK	2	Agustín Creevy (c)	(substituted off) 59'
LP	1	Santiago García Botta	(substituted off) 43'
Replacements:
HK	16	Julián Montoya	(substituted off) 59'
PR	17	Lucas Noguera Paz	(substituted off) 43'
PR	18	Enrique Pieretto	(substituted off) 62'
LK	19	Guido Petti	(substituted off) 51'
N8	20	Benjamín Macome	(substituted off) 57'
SH	21	Gonzalo Bertranou	(substituted off) 59'
CE	22	Juan Martín Hernández	(substituted off) 5'	(substituted on) 15'
WG	23	Matías Moroni	(substituted off) 57'
Coach:
(Argentina) Daniel Hourcade

Man of the Match:
Nicolás Sánchez (Argentina)

Touch judges:
Glen Jackson (New Zealand)
Pierre Brousset (France)
Television match official:
Brian MacNeice (Ireland)

Notes:

- Joaquín Tuculet (Argentina) earned his 50th test cap.

18 November 2017
16:00 CAT (UTC+2)

Namibia	36–52	Uruguay
Try: De la Harpe 28' c Kitshoff 40' c Greyling 56' m De Klerk 63' c Tromp 72' c Con: Loubser (4/5) 29', 40', 63', 73'; Pen: Loubser (1/1) 21'	Report	Try: Sanguinetti (2) 4' c, 52' c Silva (2) 13' c, 76' c Nieto (2) 23' c, 36' c Arboleya 80' c Con: Favaro (7/7) 5', 15', 23', 37', 53', 77', 80'; Pen: Favaro (1/1) 18'

Hage Geingob Rugby Stadium, Windhoek
Attendance: 2,000
Referee: Egon Seconds (South Africa)

Team details

FB	15	Johann Tromp	(substituted off) 76'
RW	14	Lesley Klim
OC	13	JC Greyling
IC	12	Darryl de la Harpe
LW	11	David Philander	(substituted off) 60'
FH	10	Cliven Loubser
SH	9	Damian Stevens	(substituted off) 74'
N8	8	Christo van der Merwe
OF	7	Thomasau Forbes	(substituted off) 64'
BF	6	Rohan Kitshoff (c)
RL	5	Ruan Ludick
LL	4	Mahepisa Tjeriko	(substituted off) 27'
TP	3	AJ de Klerk	(substituted off) 74'
HK	2	Obert Nortjé	(substituted off) 53'
LP	1	Collen Smith	(substituted off) 40'
Replacements:
HK	16	Niël van Vuuren	(substituted on) 53'
PR	17	Casper Viviers	(substituted on) 40'
PR	18	Nelius Theron	(substituted on) 74'
LK	19	Johan Retief	(substituted on) 27'
LK	20	Max Katjijeko	(substituted on) 64'
SH	21	TC Kisting	(substituted on) 74'
FH	22	Theuns Kotzé	(substituted on) 60'
CE	23	Justin Newman	(substituted on) 76'
Coach:
(Wales) Phil Davies

FB	15	Gastón Mieres
RW	14	Federico Favaro
OC	13	Nicolás Freitas
IC	12	Andrés Vilaseca
LW	11	Francisco Berchesi	(substituted off) 71'
FH	10	Rodrigo Silva
SH	9	Santiago Arata	(substituted off) 40'
N8	8	Alejandro Nieto
OF	7	Manuel Diana	(substituted off) 65'
BF	6	Juan Manuel Gaminara (c)
RL	5	Rodolfo Garese	(substituted off) 57'
LL	4	Ignacio Dotti
TP	3	Juan Echeverría	(substituted off) 73'
HK	2	Germán Kessler	(substituted off) 68'
LP	1	Mateo Sanguinetti	(substituted off) 73'
Replacements:
HK	16	Carlos Pombo	(substituted on) 68'
PR	17	Carlos Arboleya	(substituted on) 73'
PR	18	Matías Benítez	(substituted on) 73'
LK	19	Diego Magno	(substituted on) 57'
FL	20	Franco Lamanna	(substituted on) 65'
WG	21	Gastón Gibernau
SH	22	Agustín Ormaechea	(substituted on) 40'
FH	23	Agustín Della Corte	(substituted on) 71'
Coach:
(Argentina) Esteban Meneses

Touch judges:
Rasta Rasivhenge (South Africa)
Cwengile Jadezweni (South Africa)

Notes:

- Nelius Theron (Namibia) made his international debut.
- Gastón Mieres (Uruguay) earned his 50th test cap.
- This is the first time that Namibia has hosted Uruguay in a test match.
- This is Uruguay's largest winning margin over Namibia, surpassing the 11-point difference set in 2000.

18 November 2017
14:30 GMT (UTC+0)

Wales	13–6	Georgia
Try: Amos 18' c Con: Priestland (1/1) 20'; Pen: Priestland (2/2) 6', 61'	Report	Pen: Matiashvili (2/2) 28', 49'

Millennium Stadium, Cardiff
Attendance: 55,310
Referee: Mathieu Raynal (France)

Team details

FB	15	Liam Williams		(substituted off) 55'
RW	14	Alex Cuthbert
OC	13	Scott Williams
IC	12	Owen Watkin
LW	11	Hallam Amos
FH	10	Rhys Priestland
SH	9	Rhys Webb		(substituted off) 56'
N8	8	Seb Davies			(substituted off) 80'
OF	7	Sam Cross		(substituted off) 40'
BF	6	Dan Lydiate (c)
RL	5	Cory Hill		(substituted off) 74'
LL	4	Adam Beard
TP	3	Leon Brown		(substituted off) 55'
HK	2	Kristian Dacey		(substituted off) 67'	(substituted on) 80'
LP	1	Nicky Smith		(substituted off) 55'
Replacements:
HK	16	Elliot Dee		(substituted on) 67'
PR	17	Wyn Jones		(substituted on) 55'
PR	18	Tomas Francis	(yellow card) 80' to 80'	(substituted on) 55'
FL	19	Josh Navidi		(substituted on) 40'
N8	20	Taulupe Faletau		(substituted on) 74'
SH	21	Aled Davies		(substituted on) 56'
FH	22	Dan Biggar		(substituted on) 55'
CE	23	Owen Williams
Coach:
(New Zealand) Warren Gatland

FB	15	Soso Matiashvili
RW	14	Giorgi Koshadze	(substituted off) 74'
OC	13	Davit Kacharava
IC	12	Merab Sharikadze (c)
LW	11	Mirian Modebadze
FH	10	Lasha Khmaladze	(substituted off) 45'
SH	9	Vasil Lobzhanidze	(substituted off) 55'
N8	8	Beka Bitsadze
OF	7	Viktor Kolelishvili	(substituted off) 62'
BF	6	Lasha Lomidze
RL	5	Giorgi Nemsadze	(substituted off) 65'
LL	4	Konstantin Mikautadze
TP	3	Levan Chilachava	(substituted off) 62'	(substituted on) 74'
HK	2	Jaba Bregvadze	(substituted off) 66'
LP	1	Mikheil Nariashvili	(substituted off) 66'
Replacements:
HK	16	Shalva Mamukashvili	(substituted on) 66'
PR	17	Karlen Asieshvili	(substituted on) 66'
PR	18	Soso Bekoshvili	(substituted on) 62'	(substituted off) 74'
LK	19	Giorgi Chkhaidze	(substituted on) 65'
FL	20	Giorgi Tkhilaishvili	(substituted on) 62'
SH	21	Giorgi Begadze	(substituted on) 55'
FH	22	Revaz Jinchvelashvili	(substituted on) 45'
FB	23	Merab Kvirikashvili	(substituted on) 74'
Coach:
(New Zealand) Milton Haig

Man of the Match:
Dan Lydiate (Wales)

Touch judges:
Shuhei Kubo (Japan)
Sean Gallagher (Ireland)
Television match official:
Leo Colgan (Ireland)

Notes:

- Elliot Dee (Wales) made his international debut.
- This was the first meeting between the two nations.

18 November 2017
15:45 CET (UTC+1)

Spain	27–37	Canada
Try: Guillaume 19' c Contardi 23' c Auzqui 55' m López Perez 78' m Con: Linklater (2/4) 20', 24'; Pen: Linklater (1/1) 16'	Report	Try: Paris (2) 35' c, 44' c Van der Merwe (2) 39' c, 50' c Con: Staller (4/4) 36', 40', 45', 51'; Pen: Staller (3/4) 10', 59', 66'

Estadio Nacional Complutense, Madrid
Attendance: 7,000
Referee: Ian Tempest (England)

Team details

FB	15	Brad Linklater
RW	14	Ignacio Contardi		(substituted off) 67'
OC	13	Fabien Perrin
IC	12	Daniel Snee		(substituted off) 62'
LW	11	Sébastien Ascarat
FH	10	Mathieu Bélie
SH	9	Guillaume Rouet	(yellow card) 43' to 53'	(substituted off) 62'
N8	8	Fred Quercy
OF	7	Gauthier Gibouin (c)		(substituted off) 60'
BF	6	Pierre Barthère
RL	5	David Barrera Howarth
LL	4	Lucas Guillaume		(substituted off) 42'
TP	3	Jesús Moreno		(substituted off) 40'
HK	2	Marco Pinto Ferrer		(substituted off) 52'
LP	1	Beñat Auzqui		(substituted off) 57'
Replacements:
PR	16	Fernando Martin López Perez		(substituted on) 57'
HK	17	Juan Anaya Lazaro		(substituted on) 52'
PR	18	Jonathan Garcia		(substituted on) 40'
LK	19	Kalokalo Gavidi		(substituted on) 42'
FL	20	Mathieu Visensang		(substituted on) 60'
SH	21	Sébastien Rouet		(substituted on) 62'
CE	22	Thibaut Álvarez		(substituted on) 62'
WG	23	Joan Losada		(substituted on) 67'
Coach:
(Spain) Santiago Santos

FB	15	Andrew Coe
RW	14	Brock Staller	(substituted off) 69'
OC	13	D. T. H. van der Merwe
IC	12	Ciaran Hearn
LW	11	Taylor Paris
FH	10	Pat Parfrey	(substituted off) 74'
SH	9	Phil Mack (c)	(substituted off) 67'
N8	8	Aaron Carpenter	(substituted off) 30'
OF	7	Kyle Baillie
BF	6	Matt Heaton
RL	5	Evan Olmstead
LL	4	Josh Larsen	(substituted off) 74'
TP	3	Matt Tierney	(substituted off) 52'
HK	2	Ray Barkwill	(substituted off) 52'
LP	1	Hubert Buydens	(substituted off) 52'
Replacements:
HK	16	Benoît Piffero	(substituted on) 52'
PR	17	Djustice Sears-Duru	(substituted on) 52'
PR	18	Cole Keith	(substituted on) 52'
LK	19	Brett Beukeboom	(substituted on) 74'
FL	20	Kyle Gilmour	(substituted on) 30'
SH	21	Andrew Ferguson	(substituted on) 67'
CE	22	Giuseppe du Toit	(substituted on) 74'
WG	23	Kainoa Lloyd	(substituted on) 69'
Coach:
(Wales) Kingsley Jones

Touch judges:
Frank Murphy (Ireland)
Joy Neville (Ireland)

Notes:

- Joan Losada (Spain) made his international debut.

18 November 2017
15:00 GMT (UTC+0)

England	30–6	Australia
Try: Daly 53' c Joseph 71' c May 78' m Care 80' m Con: Farrell (2/4) 55', 73'; Pen: Farrell (2/2) 6', 32'	Report	Pen: Hodge (1/1) 48'; Foley (1/2) 63'

Twickenham Stadium, London
Attendance: 81,909
Referee: Ben O'Keeffe (New Zealand)

Team details

FB	15	Anthony Watson
RW	14	Jonny May
OC	13	Jonathan Joseph
IC	12	Owen Farrell
LW	11	Elliot Daly
FH	10	George Ford	(substituted off) 69'
SH	9	Ben Youngs	(substituted off) 69'
N8	8	Nathan Hughes	(substituted off) 62'
OF	7	Sam Underhill	(substituted off) 16'
BF	6	Chris Robshaw
RL	5	Courtney Lawes
LL	4	Joe Launchbury
TP	3	Dan Cole	(substituted off) 66'
HK	2	Dylan Hartley (c)	(substituted off) 56'
LP	1	Mako Vunipola	(substituted off) 63'
Replacements:
HK	16	Jamie George	(substituted on) 56'
PR	17	Joe Marler	(substituted on) 63'
PR	18	Harry Williams	(substituted on) 66'
LK	19	Maro Itoje	(substituted on) 16'
FL	20	Sam Simmonds	(substituted on) 62'
SH	21	Danny Care	(substituted on) 69'
CE	22	Henry Slade	(substituted on) 69'
WG	23	Semesa Rokoduguni
Coach:
(Australia) Eddie Jones

FB	15	Kurtley Beale	(yellow card) 40' to 50'
RW	14	Marika Koroibete
OC	13	Tevita Kuridrani
IC	12	Samu Kerevi		(substituted off) 66'
LW	11	Reece Hodge
FH	10	Bernard Foley
SH	9	Will Genia		(substituted off) 70'
N8	8	Sean McMahon		(substituted off) 78'
OF	7	Michael Hooper (c)	(yellow card) 33' to 43'
BF	6	Ned Hanigan		(substituted off) 40'
RL	5	Blake Enever		(substituted off) 61'
LL	4	Rob Simmons
TP	3	Sekope Kepu		(substituted off) 66'
HK	2	Tatafu Polota-Nau		(substituted off) 63'
LP	1	Scott Sio		(substituted off) 69'
Replacements:
HK	16	Stephen Moore		(substituted on) 63'
PR	17	Tom Robertson		(substituted on) 69'
PR	18	Allan Alaalatoa		(substituted on) 66'
LK	19	Matt Philip		(substituted on) 61'
N8	20	Ben McCalman		(substituted on) 40'
N8	21	Lopeti Timani		(substituted on) 78'
SH	22	Nick Phipps		(substituted on) 70'
FB	23	Karmichael Hunt		(substituted on) 66'
Coach:
(Australia) Michael Cheika

Man of the Match:
Joe Launchbury (England)

Touch judges:
Marius van der Westhuizen (South Africa)
George Clancy (Ireland)
Television match official:
Simon McDowell (Ireland)

Notes:

- Blake Enever (Australia) made his international debut.
- This is England's largest winning margin over Australia, surpassing the 17-point difference set in 2010.
- England retain the Cook Cup.
- England extend their winning run against Australia to five consecutive matches, equalling their previous winning run against them set between 2000 and 2003.
- Owen Farrell became England's all-time leading points scorer against Australia, surpassing Jonny Wilkinson's 114 points.
- Australian captain Michael Hooper's eighth international yellow card makes him the most yellow-carded player in test history.

18 November 2017
17:00 CET (UTC+1)

Germany	17–46	United States
Try: Schramm 12' c Cameron-Dow 71' c Con: Parkinson (2/2) 13', 72'; Pen: Parkinson (1/1) 23'	Report	Try: Scully 39' c Taufete'e 43' c Davies 48' c Matyas 62' m MacGinty 65' c Malcolm 79' c Con: MacGinty (5/6) 40', 44', 49', 66', 80'; Pen: MacGinty (2/3) 16', 26'

BRITA-Arena, Wiesbaden
Attendance: 3,150
Referee: Brendon Pickerill (New Zealand)

Team details

FB	15	Hagen Schulte	(substituted off) 72'
RW	14	Mathieu Ducau
OC	13	Wynston Cameron-Dow
IC	12	Raynor Parkinson	(substituted off) 74'
LW	11	Marcel Coetzee
FH	10	Chris Hilsenbeck
SH	9	Sean Armstrong (c)	(substituted off) 72'
N8	8	Ayron Schramm
OF	7	Jaco Otto	(substituted off) 56'
BF	6	Sebastian Ferreira
RL	5	Erik Marks	72' to 77'
LL	4	Michael Poppmeier		(substituted off) 77'
TP	3	Samy Füchsel	(substituted off) 74'
HK	2	Dasch Barber	(substituted off) 63'
LP	1	Julius Nostadt	(substituted off) 56'
Replacements:
PR	16	Jörn Schröder	(substituted on) 56'
HK	17	Mika Tyumenev	(substituted on) 63'
PR	18	Anthony Dickinson	(substituted on) 74'
LK	19	Adam Preocanin	(substituted on) 72'
LK	20	Marcel Henn	(substituted on) 56'
WG	21	Pierre Mathurin	(substituted on) 72'
WG	22	Steffen Liebig	(substituted on) 72'
CE	23	Jamie Murphy	(substituted on) 74'
Coach:
(South Africa) Kobus Potgieter

FB	15	Mike Te'o	(substituted off) 72'
RW	14	Blaine Scully (c)
OC	13	Marcel Brache
IC	12	Bryce Campbell
LW	11	Ryan Matyas	(substituted off) 63'
FH	10	AJ MacGinty
SH	9	Shaun Davies	(substituted off) 63'
N8	8	Andrew Durutalo	(substituted off) 72'
OF	7	Tony Lamborn
BF	6	Ben Landry
RL	5	Nick Civetta
LL	4	Greg Peterson	(substituted off) 40'
TP	3	Dino Waldren	(substituted off) 60'
HK	2	Joe Taufete'e	(substituted off) 60'
LP	1	Olive Kilifi	(substituted off) 72'
Replacements:
HK	16	Peter Malcolm	(substituted on) 60'
PR	17	Huluholo Moungaloa	(substituted on) 72'
PR	18	Paddy Ryan	(substituted on) 60'
N8	19	Cam Dolan	(substituted on) 72'
FL	20	John Quill	(substituted on) 40'
SH	21	Nate Augspurger	(substituted on) 63'
FH	22	Will Magie	(substituted on) 63'
CE	23	JP Eloff	(substituted on) 72'
Coach:
(New Zealand) Dave Hewett

Touch judges:
Ben Whitehouse (Wales)
Vlad Iordăchescu (Romania)

Notes:

- Adam Preocanin, Hagen Schulte (both Germany) and Huluholo Moungaloa (United States) made their international debuts.
- This was the first meeting between the two nations.

18 November 2017
18:00 EET (UTC+2)

Romania	17–13	Samoa
Try: Rădoi 58' c Badiu 74' c Con: Vlaicu (2/2) 59', 75'; Pen: Vlaicu (1/1) 18'	Report (In Romanian)	Try: Matu'u 37' c Con: Nanai-Williams (1/1) 38'; Pen: Nanai-Williams (1/1) 35', 49'

Stadionul Arcul de Triumf, Bucharest
Attendance: 6,000
Referee: Mike Adamson (Scotland)

Team details

FB	15	Marius Simionescu
RW	14	Tangimana Fonovai
OC	13	Paula Kinikinilau
IC	12	Sione Faka'osilea
LW	11	Ionuț Dumitru
FH	10	Florin Vlaicu
SH	9	Florin Surugiu
N8	8	Stelian Burcea	(substituted off) 59'
OF	7	Mihai Macovei (c)
BF	6	Andrei Gorcioaia
RL	5	Marius Antonescu
LL	4	Johannes van Heerden	(substituted off) 79'
TP	3	Andrei Ursache
HK	2	Andrei Rădoi	(substituted off) 71'
LP	1	Mihai Lazăr	(substituted off) 73'
Replacements:
PR	16	Ionel Badiu	(substituted on) 73'
HK	17	Ovidiu Cojocaru	(substituted on) 71'
PR	18	Alex Gordaș
LK	19	Ionuț Mureșan	(substituted on) 79'
N8	20	Vlad Nistor	(substituted on) 59'
SH	21	Tudorel Bratu
CE	22	Jack Umaga
WG	23	Robert Neagu
Coach:
(Wales) Lynn Howells

FB	15	Ahsee Tuala
RW	14	Paul Perez
OC	13	Kieron Fonotia
IC	12	Rey Lee-Lo		(substituted off) 78'
LW	11	David Lemi
FH	10	Tim Nanai-Williams
SH	9	Dwayne Polataivao		(substituted off) 71'
N8	8	Ofisa Treviranus		(substituted off) 59'
OF	7	Jack Lam
BF	6	Piula Faʻasalele
RL	5	Chris Vui (c)	(yellow card) 73' to 80'
LL	4	Fa'atiga Lemalu		(substituted off) 68'
TP	3	Donald Brighouse		(substituted off) 45'
HK	2	Motu Matu'u		(substituted off) 57'
LP	1	Jordan Lay		(substituted off) 54'
Replacements:
HK	16	Manu Leiataua		(substituted on) 57'
PR	17	James Lay		(substituted on) 54'
PR	18	Hisa Sasagi		(substituted on) 45'
LK	19	Brandon Nansen		(substituted on) 68'
FL	20	Maurie Fa'asavalu		(substituted on) 59'
SH	21	Melani Matavao		(substituted on) 71'
WG	22	Jamie-Jerry Taulagi
CE	23	Alapati Leiua		(substituted on) 78'
Coach:
(Samoa) Titimaea Tafua

Touch judges:
Dan Jones (Wales)
Shota Tevzadze (Georgia)
Television match official:
Neil Paterson (Scotland)

Notes:

- Brandon Nansen (Samoa) made his international debut.

18 November 2017
17:15 CET (UTC+1)

Japan	39–6	Tonga
Try: Lemeki (2) 3' c, 59' c Mafi 29' c Leitch 32' c Fukuoka 74' m Con: Tamura (4/5) 4', 30', 33', 60'; Pen: Tamura (2/2) 12', 38'	Report	Pen: Takulua (2/2) 8', 21'

Stade Ernest-Wallon, Toulouse, France
Attendance: 1,000
Referee: Andrew Brace (Ireland)

Team details

FB	15	Kotaro Matsushima	(substituted off) 71'
RW	14	Lomano Lemeki
OC	13	Timothy Lafaele	(substituted off) 65'
IC	12	Harumichi Tatekawa
LW	11	Kenki Fukuoka
FH	10	Yu Tamura
SH	9	Fumiaki Tanaka	(substituted off) 48'
N8	8	Amanaki Mafi	(substituted off) 55'
OF	7	Michael Leitch (c)
BF	6	Kazuki Himeno
RL	5	Shinya Makabe	(substituted off) 65'
LL	4	Wimpie van der Walt
TP	3	Koo Ji-won	(substituted off) 55'
HK	2	Shota Horie	(substituted off) 61'
LP	1	Keita Inagaki	(substituted off) 70'
Replacements:
HK	16	Atsushi Sakate	(substituted on) 61'
PR	17	Shintaro Ishihara	(substituted on) 70'
PR	18	Asaeli Ai Valu	(substituted on) 55'
FL	19	Shunsuke Nunomaki	(substituted on) 55'
N8	20	Fetuani Lautaimi	(substituted on) 65'
SH	21	Yutaka Nagare	(substituted on) 48'
CE	22	Sione Teaupa	(substituted on) 65'
WG	23	Yoshikazu Fujita	(substituted on) 71'
Coach:
(New Zealand) Jamie Joseph

FB	15	Atieli Pakalani
RW	14	David Halaifonua		(substituted off) 62'
OC	13	Nafi Tuitavake
IC	12	Siale Piutau
LW	11	Cooper Vuna
FH	10	Kali Hala		(substituted off) 62'
SH	9	Sonatane Takulua (c)		(substituted off) 75'
N8	8	Maama Vaipulu
OF	7	Fotu Lokotui		(substituted off) 61'
BF	6	Daniel Faleafa
RL	5	Steve Mafi		(substituted off) 40'
LL	4	Leva Fifita	(yellow card) 28' to 38'
TP	3	Halani Aulika		(substituted off) 50'
HK	2	Sione Lea		(substituted off) 67'
LP	1	Latu Talakai		(substituted off) 67'
Replacements:
HK	16	Sione Lolohea		(substituted on) 67'
PR	17	Jethro Felemi		(substituted on) 67'
PR	18	Paea Faʻanunu		(substituted on) 50'
LK	19	Onehunga Havili		(substituted on) 61'
FL	20	Sione Vailanu		(substituted on) 40'
SH	21	Shinnosuke Tu'umoto'oa		(substituted on) 75'
FH	22	George Taina		(substituted on) 62'
WG	23	Penikolo Latu	(yellow card) 74' to 80'	(substituted on) 62'
Coach:
(Australia) Toutai Kefu

Touch judges:
Pascal Gaüzère (France)
Craig Evans (Wales)
Television match official:
Jon Mason (Wales)

Notes:

- Koo Ji-won (Japan), Jethro Felemi, Onehunga Havili, Penikolo Latu, Fotu Lokotui, Sione Lolohea, George Taina, Shinnosuke Tu'umoto'oa, Sione Vailanu and Maama Vaipulu (all Tonga) made their international debuts.
- This was Japan's biggest winning margin over Tonga, surpassing the 27-point difference set in 1999.

18 November 2017
17:15 GMT (UTC+0)

Scotland	17–22	New Zealand
Try: Gray 61' c H. Jones 76' c Con: Russell (2/2) 62', 77'; Pen: Russell (1/2) 6'	Report	Try: Taylor 44' m McKenzie 50' c B. Barrett 66' c Con: B. Barrett (2/3) 51', 68'; Pen: B. Barrett (1/1) 38'

Murrayfield Stadium, Edinburgh
Attendance: 67,533
Referee: Matthew Carley (England)

Team details

FB	15	Stuart Hogg
RW	14	Tommy Seymour
OC	13	Huw Jones
IC	12	Alex Dunbar	(substituted off) 46'
LW	11	Lee Jones	(substituted off) 68'
FH	10	Finn Russell
SH	9	Ali Price	(substituted off) 75'
N8	8	Cornell du Preez
OF	7	Hamish Watson	(substituted off) 26'
BF	6	John Barclay (c)
RL	5	Jonny Gray
LL	4	Ben Toolis	(substituted off) 58'
TP	3	Zander Fagerson	(substituted off) 40'
HK	2	Stuart McInally
LP	1	Darryl Marfo	(substituted off) 58'
Replacements:
HK	16	George Turner		(substituted on) 49'
PR	17	Jamie Bhatti	(substituted on) 58'
PR	18	Simon Berghan	(substituted on) 40'
LK	19	Grant Gilchrist	(substituted on) 58'
FL	20	Luke Hamilton	(substituted on) 26'	(substituted off) 49'
SH	21	Henry Pyrgos	(substituted on) 75'
FH	22	Peter Horne	(substituted on) 46'
WG	23	Byron McGuigan	(substituted on) 68'
Coach:
(Scotland) Gregor Townsend

FB	15	Damian McKenzie
RW	14	Waisake Naholo		(substituted off) 74'
OC	13	Ryan Crotty		(substituted off) 58'	(substituted on) 64'
IC	12	Sonny Bill Williams				(substituted off) 68'
LW	11	Rieko Ioane
FH	10	Beauden Barrett
SH	9	Aaron Smith		(substituted off) 64'
N8	8	Kieran Read (c)
OF	7	Sam Cane	(yellow card) 60' to 70'	(substituted off) 74'
BF	6	Vaea Fifita			(substituted off) 70'
RL	5	Sam Whitelock
LL	4	Luke Romano		(substituted off) 46'
TP	3	Nepo Laulala		(substituted off) 58'
HK	2	Codie Taylor		(substituted off) 74'
LP	1	Kane Hames		(substituted off) 51'	(substituted on) 70'
Replacements:
HK	16	Nathan Harris		(substituted on) 74'
PR	17	Wyatt Crockett	(yellow card) 70' to 80'	(substituted on) 51'
PR	18	Ofa Tu'ungafasi		(substituted on) 58'
FL	19	Liam Squire		(substituted on) 46'
FL	20	Matt Todd		(substituted on) 74'
SH	21	TJ Perenara		(substituted on) 64'
FH	22	Lima Sopoaga		(substituted on) 74'
CE	23	Anton Lienert-Brown		(substituted on) 58'	(substituted off) 64'	(substituted on) 68'
Coach:
(New Zealand) Steve Hansen

Man of the Match:
Stuart Hogg (Scotland)

Touch judges:
Romain Poite (France)
Ian Davies (Wales)
Television match official:
Graham Hughes (England)

Notes:

- Luke Hamilton and Byron McGuigan (both Scotland) made their international debuts.

18 November 2017
17:30 WET (UTC+0)

Ireland	23–20	Fiji
Try: Sweetnam 6' m Kearney 22' m Conan 33' c Con: Carbery (1/3) 34'; Pen: Keatley (2/2) 65', 72'	Report	Try: Seniloli 39' c T. Nagusa 44' c Con: Volavola (2/2) 40', 45'; Pen: Volavola (2/2) 20', 68'

Aviva Stadium, Dublin
Attendance: 51,000
Referee: Paul Williams (New Zealand)

Team details

FB	15	Andrew Conway
RW	14	Darren Sweetnam
OC	13	Chris Farrell	(substituted off) 64'
IC	12	Stuart McCloskey
LW	11	Dave Kearney
FH	10	Joey Carbery	(substituted off) 63'
SH	9	Kieran Marmion	(substituted off) 77'
N8	8	Jack Conan
OF	7	Jordi Murphy
BF	6	Rhys Ruddock (c)	(substituted off) 61'
RL	5	Devin Toner	(substituted off) 63'
LL	4	Ultan Dillane
TP	3	Andrew Porter	(substituted off) 55'
HK	2	Rob Herring	(substituted off) 55'
LP	1	Jack McGrath	(substituted off) 55'
Replacements:
HK	16	James Tracy	(substituted on) 55'
PR	17	Cian Healy	(substituted on) 55'
PR	18	Tadhg Furlong	(substituted on) 55'
LK	19	Kieran Treadwell	(substituted on) 63'
N8	20	CJ Stander	(substituted on) 61'
SH	21	Luke McGrath	(substituted on) 77'
FH	22	Ian Keatley	(substituted on) 63'
CE	23	Robbie Henshaw	(substituted on) 64'
Coach:
(New Zealand) Joe Schmidt

FB	15	Kini Murimurivalu
RW	14	Timoci Nagusa	(substituted off) 58'
OC	13	Jale Vatubua	(substituted off) 72'
IC	12	Levani Botia
LW	11	Nemani Nadolo
FH	10	Ben Volavola
SH	9	Henry Seniloli	(substituted off) 47'
N8	8	Nemani Nagusa	(substituted off) 63'
OF	7	Akapusi Qera (c)
BF	6	Dominiko Waqaniburotu
RL	5	Leone Nakarawa
LL	4	Api Ratuniyarawa	(substituted off) 69'
TP	3	Manasa Saulo	(substituted off) 58'
HK	2	Talemaitoga Tuapati	(substituted off) 69'
LP	1	Campese Ma'afu	(substituted off) 57'
Replacements:
HK	16	Sunia Koto	(substituted on) 69'
PR	17	Peni Ravai	(substituted on) 57'
PR	18	Kalivati Tawake	(substituted on) 58'
LK	19	Sikeli Nabou	(substituted on) 69'
FL	20	Semi Kunatani	(substituted on) 63'
SH	21	Nikola Matawalu	(substituted on) 47'
CE	22	Asaeli Tikoirotuma	(substituted on) 72'
WG	23	Vereniki Goneva	(substituted on) 58'
Coach:
(New Zealand) John McKee

Man of the Match:
Andrew Conway (Ireland)

Touch judges:
Angus Gardner (Australia)
Alexandre Ruiz (France)
Television match official:
David Grashoff (England)

Notes:

- Chris Farrell (Ireland) made his international debut.

18 November 2017
20:45 CET (UTC+1)

France	17–18	South Africa
Try: Belleau 26' c Serin 75' c Con: Belleau (2/2) 27', 76'; Pen: Belleau (1/3) 47'	Report	Try: Leyds 6' m Kriel 61' c Con: Pollard (1/2) 62'; Pen: Pollard (2/5) 17', 58'

Stade de France, Saint-Denis
Attendance: 55,000
Referee: Nigel Owens (Wales)

Team details

FB	15	Nans Ducuing
RW	14	Teddy Thomas
OC	13	Mathieu Bastareaud		(substituted off) 67'
IC	12	Geoffrey Doumayrou		(substituted off) 76'
LW	11	Yoann Huget
FH	10	Anthony Belleau
SH	9	Antoine Dupont		(substituted off) 54'
N8	8	Louis Picamoles
OF	7	Kevin Gourdon		(substituted off) 52'
BF	6	Judicaël Cancoriet
RL	5	Paul Gabrillagues		(substituted off) 4'
LL	4	Sébastien Vahaamahina
TP	3	Rabah Slimani		(substituted off) 68'
HK	2	Guilhem Guirado (c)		(substituted off) 68'
LP	1	Jefferson Poirot		(substituted off) 58'
Replacements:
HK	16	Clément Maynadier		(substituted on) 68'
PR	17	Sébastien Taofifénua		(substituted on) 58'
PR	18	Daniel Kotze		(substituted on) 68'
LK	19	Paul Jedrasiak		(substituted on) 4'
FL	20	Anthony Jelonch		(substituted on) 52'
SH	21	Baptiste Serin	(yellow card) 57' to 67'	(substituted on) 54'
FH	22	François Trinh-Duc		(substituted on) 76'
CE	23	Damian Penaud		(substituted on) 67'
Coach:
(France) Guy Novès

FB	15	Andries Coetzee
RW	14	Dillyn Leyds
OC	13	Jesse Kriel
IC	12	Francois Venter
LW	11	Courtnall Skosan
FH	10	Handré Pollard
SH	9	Ross Cronjé
N8	8	Duane Vermeulen
OF	7	Siya Kolisi	(substituted off) 72'
BF	6	Francois Louw
RL	5	Lood de Jager
LL	4	Eben Etzebeth (c)	(substituted off) 61'
TP	3	Wilco Louw	(substituted off) 73'
HK	2	Malcolm Marx
LP	1	Tendai Mtawarira	(substituted off) 52'
Replacements:
HK	16	Bongi Mbonambi
PR	17	Steven Kitshoff	(substituted on) 52'
PR	18	Trevor Nyakane	(substituted on) 73'
LK	19	Franco Mostert	(substituted on) 61'
N8	20	Dan du Preez	(substituted on) 72'
SH	21	Rudy Paige
FH	22	Elton Jantjies
CE	23	Damian de Allende
Coach:
(South Africa) Allister Coetzee

Touch judges:
Wayne Barnes (England)
Tom Foley (England)
Television match official:
Rowan Kitt (England)

Notes:

- Sébastien Taofifénua (France) and Dan du Preez (South Africa) made their international debuts.

=== 25 November ===
25 November 2017
18:00 GET (UTC+4)

Georgia	21–20	United States
Try: Penalty try 16'; Chilachava 28' c Bregvadze 39' c Con: Matiashvili (2/2) 30', 39'	Report	Try: Taufete'e (2) 5' m, 23' c Campbell 76' m Con: MacGinty (1/3) 25'; Pen: MacGinty (1/2) 58'

Mikheil Meskhi Stadium, Tbilisi
Attendance: 20,000
Referee: Pierre Brousset (France)

Team details

FB	15	Merab Kvirikashvili		(substituted off) 67'
RW	14	Soso Matiashvili
OC	13	Merab Sharikadze (c)
IC	12	Giorgi Kveseladze
LW	11	Mirian Modebadze
FH	10	Revaz Jinchvelashvili
SH	9	Vasil Lobzhanidze		(substituted off) 7'
N8	8	Beka Bitsadze
OF	7	Viktor Kolelishvili	(yellow card) 23' to 33'	(substituted off) 62'
BF	6	Shalva Sutiashvili		(substituted off) 53'
RL	5	Konstantin Mikautadze
LL	4	Giorgi Chkhaidze		(substituted off) 53'
TP	3	Levan Chilachava	(yellow card) 32' to 42'	(substituted off) 67'
HK	2	Jaba Bregvadze		(substituted off) 64'
LP	1	Mikheil Nariashvili		(substituted off) 64'
Replacements:
HK	16	Shalva Mamukashvili		(substituted on) 64'
PR	17	Zurab Zhvania		(substituted on) 64'
PR	18	Soso Bekoshvili		(substituted on) 67'
LK	19	Giorgi Nemsadze		(substituted on) 53'
N8	20	Lasha Lomidze		(substituted on) 53'
FL	21	Giorgi Tkhilaishvili		(substituted on) 62'
SH	22	Gela Aprasidze		(substituted on) 7'
FH	23	Lasha Malaghuradze		(substituted on) 67'
Coach:
(New Zealand) Milton Haig

FB	15	Blaine Scully (c)
RW	14	Mike Te'o
OC	13	Marcel Brache
IC	12	Bryce Campbell
LW	11	Ryan Matyas		(substituted off) 78'
FH	10	AJ MacGinty
SH	9	Shaun Davies		(substituted off) 78'
N8	8	Samu Manoa
OF	7	John Quill		(substituted off) 53'
BF	6	Ben Landry		(substituted off) 74'
RL	5	Nick Civetta
LL	4	Greg Peterson		(substituted off) 63'
TP	3	Dino Waldren		(substituted off) 53'
HK	2	Joe Taufete'e		(substituted off) 59'
LP	1	Olive Kilifi		(substituted off) 15'
Replacements:
HK	16	Peter Malcolm		(substituted on) 59'
PR	17	Huluholo Moungaloa	(yellow card) 66' to 76'	(substituted on) 15'
PR	18	Paddy Ryan		(substituted on) 53'
LK	19	Nate Brakeley		(substituted on) 63'
FL	20	Andrew Durutalo		(substituted on) 76'
FL	21	Tony Lamborn		(substituted on) 53'
SH	22	Nate Augspurger		(substituted on) 78'
FH	23	Will Magie		(substituted on) 78'
Coach:
(New Zealand) Dave Hewett

Touch judges:
Adam Leal (England)
Jonathan Healy (England)
Television match official:
Kevin Beggs (Ireland)

Notes:

- Giorgi Chkhaidze (Georgia) earned his 100th test cap.

25 November 2017
15:00 CET (UTC+1)

Germany	10–32	Chile
Try: Szczesny 79' c Con: Heimpel (1/1) 80'; Pen: Heimpel (1/1) 7'	Report	Try: Velarde 28' c Perrotta 33' c Munita 60' c Ianiszewski 76' m Con: Ianiszewski (3/4) 29', 34', 61'; Pen: Ianiszewski (2/3) 57', 68'

Sparda-Bank-Hessen-Stadion, Offenbach
Attendance: 2,600
Referee: Dan Jones (Wales)

Team details

FB	15	Bastian Himmer
RW	14	Phil Szczesny
OC	13	Robin Plümpe
IC	12	Kain Rix
LW	11	Tim Lichtenberg
FH	10	Fabian Heimpel
SH	9	Raphael Pyrasch (c)
N8	8	Carsten Lang
OF	7	Luke Haynes
BF	6	Rafael Dutta
RL	5	Robert Lehmann
LL	4	Max Reinhard
TP	3	Paul Weiss
HK	2	Gino Gennaro
LP	1	Marcus Bender
Replacements:
HK	16	Marcel Becker
PR	17	Senzo Ngubane
PR	18	Felix Martel
LK	19	Benedikt Sabinarz
FL	20	Stefan Mau
SH	21	Daniel Koch
FH	22	Sebastian Fromm
CE	23	Carlos Soteras-Merz
Coach:
(South Africa) Vuyo Zangqa

FB	15	Tomás Ianiszewski
RW	14	Mauricia Urrutia
OC	13	Jose Ignacio Larenas (c)
IC	12	Francisco de la Fuente
LW	11	Franco Velarde
FH	10	Santiago Videla
SH	9	Juan Pablo Perrotta
N8	8	Benjamín Soto
OF	7	Anton Petrowitsch
BF	6	Javier Richard
RL	5	Mario Mayol
LL	4	Nikola Bursic
TP	3	Jose Tomas Munita
HK	2	Tomás Dussaillant
LP	1	Vittoria Lastra
Replacements:
HK	16	Ignacio Guajardo
PR	17	Claudio Zamorano
PR	18	Marco Diaz
LK	19	Raimundo Piwonka
FL	20	Manuel Dagnino
SH	21	Sergio Bascuñán
FH	22	Benjamin Pizarro
WG	23	Matias Balbontin
Coach:
(New Zealand) Mark Cross

Touch judges:
Gwyn Morris (Wales)
Aled Evans (Wales)

Notes:

- Marcel Becker, Rafael Dutta, Sebastian Fromm, Gino Gennaro, Luke Haynes, Carsten Lang, Robert Lehmann, Tim Lichtenberg, Felix Martel, Stefan Mau, Senzo Ngubane, Robin Plümpe, Max Reinhard, Kain Rix and Benedikt Sabinarz (all Germany) made their international debuts.
- This was the first meeting between the two nations.

25 November 2017
15:00 CET (UTC+1)

Italy	6–35	South Africa
Pen: Canna (2/3) 10', 19'	Report	Try: F. Louw 13' c Mbonambi 23' c Venter 33' c Kitshoff 43' c Mostert 75'; Con: Pollard (4/4) 15', 24', 34', 44'; Jantjies (1/1) 77'

Stadio Euganeo, Padua
Attendance: 23,595
Referee: Romain Poite (France)

Team details

FB	15	Jayden Hayward
RW	14	Angelo Esposito
OC	13	Tommaso Boni
IC	12	Tommaso Castello	(substituted off) 70'
LW	11	Mattia Bellini
FH	10	Carlo Canna	(substituted off) 54'
SH	9	Marcello Violi	(substituted off) 48'
N8	8	Sergio Parisse (c)
OF	7	Braam Steyn	(substituted off) 48'
BF	6	Giovanni Licata
RL	5	Dean Budd
LL	4	Marco Fuser	(substituted off) 68'
TP	3	Simone Ferrari	(substituted off) 60'
HK	2	Luca Bigi	(substituted off) 48'
LP	1	Andrea Lovotti
Replacements:
HK	16	Leonardo Ghiraldini	(substituted on) 48'
PR	17	Federico Zani
PR	18	Tiziano Pasquali	(substituted on) 60'
FL	19	Francesco Minto	(substituted on) 68'
FL	20	Renato Giammarioli	(substituted on) 48'
SH	21	Edoardo Gori	(substituted on) 48'
FH	22	Ian McKinley	(substituted on) 54'
FB	23	Matteo Minozzi	(substituted on) 70'
Coach:
(Ireland) Conor O'Shea

FB	15	Andries Coetzee
RW	14	Dillyn Leyds
OC	13	Jesse Kriel
IC	12	Francois Venter
LW	11	Courtnall Skosan	(substituted off) 60'
FH	10	Handré Pollard	(substituted off) 65'
SH	9	Ross Cronjé
N8	8	Duane Vermeulen
OF	7	Pieter-Steph du Toit	(substituted off) 73'
BF	6	Francois Louw
RL	5	Lood de Jager
LL	4	Eben Etzebeth (c)	(substituted off) 60'
TP	3	Wilco Louw	(substituted off) 65'
HK	2	Bongi Mbonambi	(substituted off) 60'
LP	1	Tendai Mtawarira	(substituted off) 27'
Replacements:
HK	16	Chiliboy Ralepelle	(substituted on) 60'
PR	17	Steven Kitshoff	(substituted on) 27'
PR	18	Trevor Nyakane	(substituted on) 65'
LK	19	Franco Mostert	(substituted on) 60'
N8	20	Dan du Preez	(substituted on) 73'
SH	21	Rudy Paige	(substituted on) 54'
FH	22	Elton Jantjies	(substituted on) 65'
FB	23	Warrick Gelant	(substituted on) 60'
Coach:
(South Africa) Allister Coetzee

Man of the Match:
Handré Pollard (South Africa)

Touch judges:
John Lacey (Ireland)
Ben Whitehouse (Wales)
Television match official:
Eric Gauzins (France)

Notes:

- Renato Giammarioli (Italy) and Warrick Gelant (South Africa) made their international debuts.

25 November 2017
16:00 CAT (UTC+2)

Namibia	34–39	Uruguay
Try: Kitshoff 26' c De la Harpe (2) 31' c, 55' m Nortjé 70' m Greyling 74' m Con: Loubser (2/3) 27', 32'; Kotzé (1/2) 75'; Pen: Loubser (1/1) 20'	Report	Try: Echeverría 9' c Ormaechea 15' c Kessler 48' m Arata (2) 57' c, 66' c Con: Favaro (4/5) 11', 16', 58', 68'; Pen: Favaro (2/3) 38', 78'

Hage Geingob Rugby Stadium, Windhoek
Attendance: 3,000
Referee: Rasta Rasivhenge (South Africa)

Team details

FB	15	Chrysander Botha	(substituted off) 58'
RW	14	Lesley Klim
OC	13	JC Greyling
IC	12	Darryl de la Harpe
LW	11	Gino Wilson
FH	10	Cliven Loubser
SH	9	Damian Stevens	(substituted off) 71'
N8	8	Adriaan Booysen	(substituted off) 54'
OF	7	Johan Retief
BF	6	Rohan Kitshoff (c)
RL	5	Ruan Ludick
LL	4	Tjiuee Uanivi
TP	3	Nelius Theron	(substituted off) 40'
HK	2	Niël van Vuuren	(substituted off) 62'
LP	1	Casper Viviers	(substituted off) 71'
Replacements:
HK	16	Obert Nortjé	(substituted on) 62'
PR	17	Collen Smith	(substituted on) 71'
PR	18	AJ de Klerk	(substituted on) 40'
FL	19	Prince ǃGaoseb
FL	20	Christo van der Merwe	(substituted on) 54'
SH	21	Eugene Jantjies	(substituted on) 71'
FH	22	Theuns Kotzé	(substituted on) 58'
CE	23	Justin Newman
Coach:
(Wales) Phil Davies

FB	15	Gastón Mieres
RW	14	Federico Favaro
OC	13	Nicolás Freitas
IC	12	Andrés Vilaseca
LW	11	Gastón Gibernau		(substituted off) 65'
FH	10	Rodrigo Silva
SH	9	Agustín Ormaechea		(substituted off) 51'
N8	8	Alejandro Nieto
OF	7	Gonzalo Soto		(substituted off) 51'
BF	6	Juan Manuel Gaminara (c)
RL	5	Diego Ayala		(substituted off) 51'
LL	4	Ignacio Dotti	(yellow card) 25' to 35'	(substituted off) 64'
TP	3	Juan Echeverría		(substituted off) 62'
HK	2	Germán Kessler		(substituted off) 64'
LP	1	Mateo Sanguinetti		(substituted off) 71'
Replacements:
HK	16	Carlos Pombo		(substituted on) 64'
PR	17	Carlos Arboleya		(substituted on) 62'
PR	18	Matías Benítez		(substituted on) 71'
FL	19	Rodolfo Garese		(substituted on) 51'
LK	20	Diego Magno		(substituted on) 64'
FL	21	Franco Lamanna		(substituted on) 51'
SH	22	Santiago Arata		(substituted on) 51'
FH	23	Agustín Della Corte		(substituted on) 65'
Coach:
(Argentina) Esteban Meneses

Touch judges:
Egon Seconds (South Africa)
Cwengile Jadezweni (South Africa)

25 November 2017
14:30 GMT (UTC+0)

Scotland	53–24	Australia
Try: McGuigan (2) 15' c, 60' m Price 39' c Maitland 45' m Gray 48' c Jones 55' m Barclay 74' c McInally 79' c Con: Russell (5/8) 17', 40', 49', 75', 80'; Pen: Russell (1/1) 14'	Report	Try: Kuridrani (2) 33' c, 36' m Beale 42' m Timani 68' c Con: Foley (2/4) 34', 68'

Murrayfield Stadium, Edinburgh
Attendance: 67,144
Referee: Pascal Gaüzère (France)

Team details

FB	15	Sean Maitland	(substituted off) 72'
RW	14	Tommy Seymour
OC	13	Huw Jones
IC	12	Peter Horne	(substituted off) 61'
LW	11	Byron McGuigan
FH	10	Finn Russell
SH	9	Ali Price	(substituted off) 66'
N8	8	Ryan Wilson
OF	7	Hamish Watson	(substituted off) 66'
BF	6	John Barclay (c)
RL	5	Jonny Gray
LL	4	Grant Gilchrist	(substituted off) 53'
TP	3	Simon Berghan	(substituted off) 40'
HK	2	Stuart McInally	(substituted off) 57'	(substituted on) 69'
LP	1	Darryl Marfo	(substituted off) 40'
Replacements:
HK	16	Fraser Brown	(substituted on) 57'	(substituted off) 69'
PR	17	Jamie Bhatti	(substituted on) 40'
PR	18	Zander Fagerson	(substituted on) 40'
LK	19	Ben Toolis	(substituted on) 53'
N8	20	Cornell du Preez	(substituted on) 66'
SH	21	Henry Pyrgos	(substituted on) 66'
CE	22	Phil Burleigh	(substituted on) 61'
FH	23	Ruaridh Jackson	(substituted on) 72'
Coach:
(Scotland) Gregor Townsend

FB	15	Kurtley Beale	(yellow card) 78' to 80'
RW	14	Marika Koroibete		(substituted off) 67'
OC	13	Tevita Kuridrani
IC	12	Samu Kerevi		(substituted off) 61'
LW	11	Reece Hodge
FH	10	Bernard Foley
SH	9	Will Genia		(substituted off) 57'
N8	8	Sean McMahon
OF	7	Michael Hooper (c)
BF	6	Ben McCalman		(substituted off) 53'
RL	5	Blake Enever		(substituted off) 53'
LL	4	Rob Simmons		(substituted off) 67'
TP	3	Sekope Kepu	(red card) 38'
HK	2	Stephen Moore		(substituted off) 59'
LP	1	Scott Sio		(substituted off) 70'
Replacements:
HK	16	Tatafu Polota-Nau		(substituted on) 59'
PR	17	Tetera Faulkner		(substituted on) 70'
PR	18	Taniela Tupou		(substituted on) 53'
LK	19	Lukhan Tui		(substituted on) 53'
N8	20	Lopeti Timani		(substituted on) 67'
SH	21	Nick Phipps		(substituted on) 57'
FB	22	Karmichael Hunt		(substituted on) 61'
WG	23	Henry Speight		(substituted on) 67'
Coach:
(Australia) Michael Cheika

Man of the Match:
Byron McGuigan (Scotland)

Touch judges:
JP Doyle (England)
David Wilkinson (Ireland)
Television match official:
Graham Hughes (England)

Notes:

- Phil Burleigh (Scotland) and Taniela Tupou (Australia) made their international debuts.
- Stuart Hogg was named in the starting XV, but was injured in the warm-up.
- Sekope Kepu is the first Wallaby to be red-carded since Tevita Kuridrani in 2013.
- This is Scotland's largest winning margin over Australia, surpassing the nine-point margin set in 1981.
- This is the most points Scotland has ever scored against Australia.
- This is Scotland's first win over Australia in Scotland since 2009.
- This is the first time that Scotland has beaten Australia more than once in one calendar year.
- Scotland retain the Hopetoun Cup for the first time since 2012.

25 November 2017
15:30 CET (UTC+1)

Spain	67–28	Brazil
	Report

Estadio El Pantan, Villajoyosa
Referee: Sean Gallagher (Ireland)

Team details

FB	15	Charly Malié
RW	14	Brad Linklater
OC	13	Mathieu Peluchon
IC	12	Thibaut Álvarez
LW	11	Ignacio Contardi
FH	10	Daniel Snee
SH	9	Guillaume Rouet
N8	8	Thibault Visensang
OF	7	Gauthier Gibouin (c)
BF	6	Pierre Barthère
RL	5	Anibal Bonan
LL	4	David Barrera Howarth
TP	3	Jonathan Garcia
HK	2	Marco Pinto Ferrer
LP	1	Beñat Auzqui
Replacements:
PR	16	Fernando Martin López Perez
HK	17	Juan Anaya Lazaro
PR	18	Jesús Moreno
LK	19	Kalokalo Gavidi
FL	20	Jaime Nava de Olano
SH	21	Sébastien Rouet
FH	22	Alvar Gimeno
CE	23	Fabien Perrin
Coach:
(Spain) Santiago Santos

FB	15	Daniel Sancery
RW	14	Jacobus De Wet van Niekerk
OC	13	Felipe Sancery (c)
IC	12	Moisés Duque
LW	11	Stefano Giantorno
FH	10	Josh Reeves
SH	9	Matheus Cruz
N8	8	André Arruda
OF	7	Cléber Dias
BF	6	Artur Bergo
RL	5	Mauricio Canterle
LL	4	Lucas Piero
TP	3	Pedro Bengaló
HK	2	Endy Willian
LP	1	Michel Gomes
Replacements:
HK	16	Yan Rosetti
PR	17	Lucas Abud
PR	18	Caíque Silva
FL	19	Alexandre Alves
SH	20	Matheus da Cruz
SH	21	Douglas Rauth
WG	22	Lucas Tranquez
WG	23	Lucas Muller
Coach:
(Argentina) Rodolfo Ambrosio

Touch judges:
Kieran Barry (Ireland)
Ken Imbusch (Ireland)

25 November 2017
15:00 GMT (UTC+0)

England	48–14	Samoa
Try: Brown 1' c Lozowski 8' m Ewels 28' c Daly 60' c, 76' c Slade 69' c Rokoduguni 80' m Con: Ford (5/7) 2', 29', 61', 70', 78'; Pen: Ford (1/1) 18'	Report	Try: Faʻasalele 12' c Vui 72' c Con: Nanai-Williams (2/2) 13', 73'

Twickenham Stadium, London
Attendance: 81,911
Referee: Andrew Brace (Ireland)

Team details

FB	15	Mike Brown
RW	14	Jonny May	(substituted off) 46'
OC	13	Henry Slade
IC	12	Alex Lozowski	(substituted off) 56'
LW	11	Elliot Daly
FH	10	George Ford (c)
SH	9	Danny Care	(substituted off) 56'
N8	8	Sam Simmonds
OF	7	Chris Robshaw (c)
BF	6	Maro Itoje
RL	5	Charlie Ewels	(substituted off) 63'
LL	4	Joe Launchbury	(substituted off) 30'
TP	3	Dan Cole	(substituted off) 56'
HK	2	Jamie George	(substituted off) 63'
LP	1	Ellis Genge	(substituted off) 45'
Replacements:
HK	16	Dylan Hartley	(substituted on) 63'
PR	17	Joe Marler	(substituted on) 45'
PR	18	Harry Williams	(substituted on) 56'
LK	19	Nick Isiekwe	(substituted on) 63'
LK	20	Courtney Lawes	(substituted on) 30'
SH	21	Ben Youngs	(substituted on) 56'
CE	22	Piers Francis	(substituted on) 56'
WG	23	Semesa Rokoduguni	(substituted on) 46'
Coach:
(Australia) Eddie Jones

FB	15	Ahsee Tuala
RW	14	Paul Perez
OC	13	Kieron Fonotia
IC	12	Alapati Leiua	(substituted off) 67'
LW	11	David Lemi	(substituted off) 73'
FH	10	Tim Nanai-Williams
SH	9	Dwayne Polataivao	(substituted off) 73'
N8	8	Jack Lam	(substituted off) 67'
OF	7	TJ Ioane
BF	6	Piula Faʻasalele
RL	5	Chris Vui (c)
LL	4	Josh Tyrell	(substituted off) 61'
TP	3	Donald Brighouse	(substituted off) 46'
HK	2	Motu Matu'u	(substituted off) 30'
LP	1	Jordan Lay	(substituted off) 57'
Replacements:
HK	16	Manu Leiataua	(substituted on) 30'
PR	17	James Lay	(substituted on) 57'
PR	18	Hisa Sasagi	(substituted on) 46'
LK	19	Fa'atiga Lemalu	(substituted on) 61'
FL	20	Ofisa Treviranus	(substituted on) 67'
SH	21	Melani Matavao	(substituted on) 73'
CE	22	Rey Lee-Lo	(substituted on) 67'
WG	23	Jamie-Jerry Taulagi	(substituted on) 73'
Coach:
(Samoa) Titimaea Tafua

Man of the Match:
George Ford (England)

Touch judges:
Nigel Owens (Wales)
Wayne Davies (Wales)
Television match official:
Simon McDowell (Ireland)

Notes:

- Jamie-Jerry Taulagi (Samoa) made his international debut.

25 November 2017
18:00 EET (UTC+2)

Romania	20–25	Tonga
Try: Rădoi 54' c Van Heerden 61' c Con: Vlaicu (2/2) 56', 62'; Pen: Vlaicu (2/2) 4', 23'	Report (In Romanian)	Try: Pakalani 40' m Fifita 44' c Taina 59' c Con: Takulua (2/3) 46', 60'; Pen: Takulua (1/1) 19'; Drop: Takulua (1/1) 69'

Stadionul Arcul de Triumf, Bucharest
Referee: Tom Foley (England)

Team details

FB	15	Marius Simionescu
RW	14	Tangimana Fonovai
OC	13	Paula Kinikinilau	(substituted off) 63'
IC	12	Sione Faka'osilea
LW	11	Ionuț Dumitru
FH	10	Florin Vlaicu
SH	9	Florin Surugiu
N8	8	Stelian Burcea (c)	(substituted off) 61'
OF	7	Vlad Nistor
BF	6	Cristi Chirica	(substituted off) 76'
RL	5	Valentin Popârlan
LL	4	Johannes van Heerden
TP	3	Alexandru Țăruș
HK	2	Andrei Rădoi	(substituted off) 56'
LP	1	Mihai Lazăr	(substituted off) 70'
Replacements:
HK	16	Florin Bărdașu	(substituted on) 56'
PR	17	Ionel Badiu	(substituted on) 70'
PR	18	Alex Gordaș
LK	19	Adrian Motoc	(substituted on) 76'
FL	20	Kuselo Moyake	(substituted on) 61'
SH	21	Tudorel Bratu
CE	22	Jack Umaga	(substituted on) 63'
WG	23	Fili Lomani
Coach:
(Wales) Lynn Howells

FB	15	Atieli Pakalani		(substituted off) 40'
RW	14	Penikolo Latu
OC	13	Nafi Tuitavake		56' to 63'
IC	12	Siale Piutau (c)
LW	11	Cooper Vuna
FH	10	George Taina
SH	9	Sonatane Takulua
N8	8	Maama Vaipulu
OF	7	Fotu Lokotui		(substituted off) 72'
BF	6	Daniel Faleafa		(substituted off) 63'
RL	5	Steve Mafi
LL	4	Leva Fifita
TP	3	Paea Faʻanunu		(substituted off) 56'
HK	2	Sione Lea		(substituted off) 70'
LP	1	Latu Talakai		(substituted off) 70'
Replacements:
HK	16	Sione Lolohea		(substituted on) 70'
PR	17	Jethro Felemi		(substituted on) 70'
PR	18	Leo Halavatau		(substituted on) 56'
LK	19	Onehunga Havili		(substituted on) 72'
FL	20	Sione Vailanu		(substituted on) 63'
SH	21	Shinnosuke Tu'umoto'oa
FH	22	Kali Hala		(substituted on) 56'	(substituted off) 63'
CE	23	Fetuli Paea	(yellow card) 57' to 67'	(substituted on) 40'
Coach:
(Australia) Toutai Kefu

Touch judges:
Rhys Thomas (Wales)
Shota Tevzadze (Georgia)
Television match official:
Stefano Penne (Italy)

Notes:

- Adrian Motoc, Kuselo Moyake (both Romania) and Leo Halavatau (Tonga) made their international debuts.

25 November 2017
18:00 CET (UTC+1)

Fiji	57–17	Canada
Try: Tawake 7' c Tuapati 22' m Penalty try 28'; Lomani 33' c Goneva 40' c Yato 44' m Nakarawa 67' c Botia 73' c Kunatani 77' m Con: Volavola (5/8) 8', 34', 40', 68', 74'	Report	Try: Penalty try 15'; Sears-Duru 64' c Con: Staller (1/1) 65'; Pen: Staller (1/1) 31'

Parc des Sports Et de l'Amitié, Narbonne, France
Referee: Matthew Carley (England)

Team details

FB	15	Kini Murimurivalu	(yellow card) 15' to 25'	(substituted off) 53'
RW	14	Josua Tuisova
OC	13	Vereniki Goneva		(substituted off) 62'
IC	12	Levani Botia
LW	11	Nemani Nadolo
FH	10	Ben Volavola
SH	9	Frank Lomani		(substituted off) 69'
N8	8	Akapusi Qera (c)		(substituted off) 58'
OF	7	Semi Kunatani
BF	6	Dominiko Waqaniburotu	(yellow card) 60' to 70'
RL	5	Leone Nakarawa		(substituted off) 69'
LL	4	Peceli Yato
TP	3	Kalivati Tawake		(substituted off) 60'
HK	2	Talemaitoga Tuapati		(substituted off) 71'
LP	1	Campese Ma'afu		(substituted off) 60'
Replacements:
HK	16	Ratunaisa Navuma		(substituted on) 71'
PR	17	Joeli Veitayaki Jr.		(substituted on) 60'
PR	18	Ropate Rinakama		(substituted on) 60'
LK	19	Sikeli Nabou		(substituted on) 69'
N8	20	Nemani Nagusa		(substituted on) 58'
SH	21	Henry Seniloli		(substituted on) 69'
CE	22	Asaeli Tikoirotuma		(substituted on) 62'
WG	23	Timoci Nagusa		(substituted on) 53'
Coach:
(New Zealand) John McKee

FB	15	Andrew Coe	(substituted off) 38'
RW	14	Brock Staller
OC	13	D. T. H. van der Merwe
IC	12	Ciaran Hearn	(substituted off) 39'
LW	11	Taylor Paris
FH	10	Pat Parfrey	(substituted off) 52'
SH	9	Phil Mack (c)	(substituted off) 58'
N8	8	Kyle Gilmour
OF	7	Matt Heaton
BF	6	Kyle Baillie	(substituted off) 69'
RL	5	Evan Olmstead
LL	4	Josh Larsen
TP	3	Jake Ilnicki	(substituted off) 46'
HK	2	Benoît Piffero	(substituted off) 46'
LP	1	Hubert Buydens	23' to 27'		(substituted off) 45'
Replacements:
HK	16	Ray Barkwill	(substituted on) 46'
PR	17	Djustice Sears-Duru	(substituted on) 23'	(substituted off) 27'	(substituted on) 45'
PR	18	Matt Tierney	(substituted on) 46'
LK	19	Brett Beukeboom	(substituted on) 69'
FL	20	Lucas Rumball	(substituted on) 58'
SH	21	Andrew Ferguson	(substituted on) 52'
CE	22	Ben LeSage	(substituted on) 39'
WG	23	Kainoa Lloyd	(substituted on) 38'
Coach:
(Wales) Kingsley Jones

Touch judges:
Shuhei Kubo (Japan)
Vlad Iordăchescu (Romania)
Television match official:
Brian MacNeice (Ireland)

Notes:

- Ratunaisa Navuma (Fiji) made his international debut.
- Campese Ma'afu (Fiji) earned his 50th test cap.
- This is Fiji's largest winning margin over Canada, surpassing the 31-point difference set in 2000.

25 November 2017
17:15 GMT (UTC+0)

Wales	18–33	New Zealand
Try: S. Williams 40' m Davies 68' c Con: Halfpenny (1/2) 70'; Pen: Halfpenny (2/3) 8', 31'	Report	Try: Naholo (2) 13' c, 37' m Lienert-Brown 56' c Ioane (2) 61' c, 73' c Con: B. Barrett (4/5) 14', 56', 63', 74'

Millennium Stadium, Cardiff
Attendance: 74,169
Referee: Wayne Barnes (England)

Team details

FB	15	Leigh Halfpenny
RW	14	Hallam Amos
OC	13	Scott Williams	(substituted off) 57'
IC	12	Owen Williams
LW	11	Steff Evans
FH	10	Dan Biggar	(substituted off) 63'
SH	9	Rhys Webb	(substituted off) 8'
N8	8	Taulupe Faletau
OF	7	Josh Navidi
BF	6	Aaron Shingler	(substituted off) 70'
RL	5	Alun Wyn Jones (c)
LL	4	Jake Ball
TP	3	Tomas Francis	(substituted off) 75'
HK	2	Ken Owens	(substituted off) 75'
LP	1	Rob Evans	(substituted off) 57'
Replacements:
HK	16	Kristian Dacey	(substituted on) 75'
PR	17	Wyn Jones	(substituted on) 57'
PR	18	Leon Brown	(substituted on) 75'
LK	19	Cory Hill	(substituted on) 18'
FL	20	Justin Tipuric	(substituted on) 70'
SH	21	Gareth Davies	(substituted on) 8'
FH	22	Rhys Priestland	(substituted on) 63'
CE	23	Jamie Roberts	(substituted on) 57'
Coach:
(New Zealand) Warren Gatland

FB	15	Damian McKenzie
RW	14	Waisake Naholo		(substituted off) 70'
OC	13	Ryan Crotty		(substituted off) 18'
IC	12	Sonny Bill Williams
LW	11	Rieko Ioane
FH	10	Beauden Barrett
SH	9	Aaron Smith		(substituted off) 63'
N8	8	Luke Whitelock		(substituted off) 45'
OF	7	Sam Cane
BF	6	Liam Squire
RL	5	Sam Whitelock (c)	(yellow card) 67' to 77'
LL	4	Patrick Tuipulotu		(substituted off) 45'
TP	3	Nepo Laulala		(substituted off) 40'
HK	2	Codie Taylor		(substituted off) 70'
LP	1	Kane Hames		(substituted off) 59'
Replacements:
HK	16	Nathan Harris		(substituted on) 70'
PR	17	Wyatt Crockett		(substituted on) 59'
PR	18	Ofa Tu'ungafasi		(substituted on) 40'
LK	19	Scott Barrett		(substituted on) 45'
FL	20	Matt Todd		(substituted on) 45'
SH	21	TJ Perenara		(substituted on) 63'
FH	22	Lima Sopoaga		(substituted on) 70'
CE	23	Anton Lienert-Brown		(substituted on) 18'
Coach:
(New Zealand) Steve Hansen

Man of the Match:
Rieko Ioane (New Zealand)

Touch judges:
Jérôme Garcès (France)
Frank Murphy (Ireland)
Television match official:
Rowan Kitt (England)

Notes:

- Rhys Priestland and Scott Williams (both Wales) earned their 50th test caps.

25 November 2017
17:30 WET (UTC+0)

Ireland	28–19	Argentina
Try: Stockdale (2) 20' c, 41' c Stander 62' m Con: Sexton (2/3) 21', 42'; Pen: Sexton (3/3) 3', 13', 74'	Report	Try: Tuculet 54' c Leguizamón 70' m Montoya 80' c Con: Sánchez (2/3) 55', 80'

Aviva Stadium, Dublin
Attendance: 51,000
Referee: Mathieu Raynal (France)

Team details

FB	15	Rob Kearney
RW	14	Adam Byrne
OC	13	Chris Farrell	(substituted off) 59'
IC	12	Bundee Aki
LW	11	Jacob Stockdale
FH	10	Johnny Sexton	(substituted off) 74'
SH	9	Conor Murray	(substituted off) 76'
N8	8	CJ Stander
OF	7	Seán O'Brien	(substituted off) 63'
BF	6	Peter O'Mahony	(substituted off) 74'
RL	5	Iain Henderson
LL	4	James Ryan	(substituted off) 48'
TP	3	Tadhg Furlong	(substituted off) 66'
HK	2	Rory Best (c)
LP	1	Cian Healy	(substituted off) 59'
Replacements:
HK	16	James Tracy	(substituted on) 74'
PR	17	Dave Kilcoyne	(substituted on) 59'
PR	18	John Ryan	(substituted on) 66'
LK	19	Devin Toner	(substituted on) 48'
FL	20	Rhys Ruddock	(substituted on) 63'
SH	21	Luke McGrath	(substituted on) 76'
FH	22	Ian Keatley	(substituted on) 74'
WG	23	Andrew Conway	(substituted on) 59'
Coach:
(New Zealand) Joe Schmidt

FB	15	Joaquín Tuculet
RW	14	Ramiro Moyano
OC	13	Matías Moroni
IC	12	Santiago González Iglesias	(substituted off) 55'
LW	11	Emiliano Boffelli	(substituted off) 66'
FH	10	Nicolás Sánchez
SH	9	Martín Landajo	(substituted off) 57'
N8	8	Tomás Lezana
OF	7	Marcos Kremer
BF	6	Pablo Matera
RL	5	Tomás Lavanini	(substituted off) 63'
LL	4	Matías Alemanno	(substituted off) 55'
TP	3	Nahuel Tetaz Chaparro	(substituted off) 63'
HK	2	Agustín Creevy (c)	(substituted off) 59'
LP	1	Santiago García Botta	(substituted off) 63'
Replacements:
HK	16	Julián Montoya	(substituted on) 59'
PR	17	Lucas Noguera Paz	(substituted on) 63'
PR	18	Enrique Pieretto	(substituted on) 63'
LK	19	Guido Petti	(substituted on) 55'
FL	20	Juan Manuel Leguizamón	(substituted on) 63'
SH	21	Gonzalo Bertranou	(substituted on) 57'
CE	22	Jerónimo de la Fuente	(substituted on) 55'
WG	23	Sebastián Cancelliere	(substituted on) 66'
Coach:
(Argentina) Daniel Hourcade

Man of the Match:
Jacob Stockdale (Ireland)

Touch judges:
Marius Mitrea (Italy)
Mike Adamson (Scotland)
Television match official:
David Grashoff (England)

Notes:

- Adam Byrne (Ireland) made his international debut.

25 November 2017
20:45 CET (UTC+1)

France	23–23	Japan
Try: Slimani 39' c Lacroix 48' c Con: Trinh-Duc (2/2) 40', 50'; Pen: Trinh Duc (3/3) 13', 29', 67'	Report	Try: Horie 22' m Lafaele 41' c Ai Valu 72' m Con: Tamura (1/3) 43'; Pen: Tamura (2/2) 4', 62'

U Arena, Nanterre
Attendance: 23,000
Referee: Luke Pearce (England)

Team details

FB	15	Scott Spedding	(substituted off) 48'
RW	14	Teddy Thomas
OC	13	Damian Penaud	(substituted off) 45'
IC	12	Henry Chavancy
LW	11	Gabriel Lacroix
FH	10	François Trinh-Duc
SH	9	Baptiste Serin	(substituted off) 65'
N8	8	Louis Picamoles	(substituted off) 74'
OF	7	Sekou Macalou
BF	6	Judicaël Cancoriet
RL	5	Sébastien Vahaamahina
LL	4	Romain Taofifénua	(substituted off) 40'
TP	3	Rabah Slimani	(substituted off) 74'
HK	2	Guilhem Guirado (c)	(substituted off) 54'
LP	1	Jefferson Poirot	(substituted off) 49'
Replacements:
HK	16	Camille Chat	(substituted on) 54'
PR	17	Sébastien Taofifénua	(substituted on) 49'
PR	18	Daniel Kotze	(substituted on) 74'
LK	19	Paul Jedrasiak	(substituted on) 40'
FL	20	Fabien Sanconnie	(substituted on) 74'
SH	21	Antoine Dupont	(substituted on) 65'
CE	22	Mathieu Bastareaud	(substituted on) 45'
WG	23	Hugo Bonneval	(substituted on) 48'
Coach:
(France) Guy Novès

FB	15	Kotaro Matsushima
RW	14	Lomano Lemeki
OC	13	Timothy Lafaele
IC	12	Harumichi Tatekawa	(substituted off) 60'
LW	11	Kenki Fukuoka	(substituted off) 17'
FH	10	Yu Tamura
SH	9	Yutaka Nagare	(substituted off) 60'
N8	8	Amanaki Mafi
OF	7	Michael Leitch (c)
BF	6	Kazuki Himeno
RL	5	Shinya Makabe	(substituted off) 7'	(substituted on) 16'			(substituted off) 60'
LL	4	Wimpie van der Walt			28' to 33'		(substituted off) 67'
TP	3	Koo Ji-won	(substituted off) 54'
HK	2	Shota Horie
LP	1	Keita Inagaki	(substituted off) 67'
Replacements:
HK	16	Atsushi Sakate
PR	17	Shintaro Ishihara	(substituted on) 67'
PR	18	Asaeli Ai Valu	(substituted on) 54'
FL	19	Yoshitaka Tokunaga	(substituted on) 7'	(substituted off) 16'	(substituted on) 28'	(substituted off) 33'	(substituted on) 60'
N8	20	Fetuani Lautaimi					(substituted on) 67'
SH	21	Fumiaki Tanaka	(substituted on) 60'
CE	22	Sione Teaupa	(substituted on) 60'
WG	23	Yoshikazu Fujita	(substituted on) 17'
Coach:
(New Zealand) Jamie Joseph

Touch judges:
George Clancy (Ireland)
Joy Neville (Ireland)
Television match official:
Sean Davey (England)

Notes:

- This is the first draw between the two nations.
- Gabriel Lacroix and Sekou Macalou (both France) made their international debuts.
- This was the first rugby match at U Arena, which opened the previous month and became the new home of Top 14 side Racing 92 in December 2017.

=== 2 December ===
2 December 2017
14:30 GMT (UTC+0)

Wales	24–22	South Africa
Try: Williams 4' c Parkes (2) 7' c, 32' c Con: Halfpenny (3/3) 5', 8', 33'; Pen: Halfpenny (1/1) 67'		Try: Gelant 36' c Pollard 45' m Kriel 54' c Con: Pollard (2/3) 38', 55'; Pen: Pollard (1/1) 30'

Millennium Stadium, Cardiff
Attendance: 65,317
Referee: Jérôme Garcès (France)

Team details

FB	15	Leigh Halfpenny
RW	14	Hallam Amos
OC	13	Scott Williams
IC	12	Hadleigh Parkes
LW	11	Steff Evans
FH	10	Dan Biggar	(substituted off) 47'
SH	9	Aled Davies	(substituted off) 56'
N8	8	Taulupe Faletau
OF	7	Josh Navidi	(substituted off) 74'
BF	6	Aaron Shingler
RL	5	Alun Wyn Jones (c)
LL	4	Cory Hill
TP	3	Scott Andrews
HK	2	Kristian Dacey	(substituted off) 53'
LP	1	Rob Evans	(substituted off) 47'
Replacements:
HK	16	Elliot Dee	(substituted on) 53'
PR	17	Wyn Jones	(substituted on) 47'
PR	18	Rhodri Jones
LK	19	Seb Davies
FL	20	Dan Lydiate	(substituted on) 74'
SH	21	Rhys Webb	(substituted on) 56'
FH	22	Rhys Patchell	(substituted on) 47'
CE	23	Owen Watkin
Coach:
(New Zealand) Warren Gatland

FB	15	Andries Coetzee	(substituted off) 76'
RW	14	Dillyn Leyds
OC	13	Jesse Kriel
IC	12	Francois Venter
LW	11	Warrick Gelant
FH	10	Handré Pollard	(substituted off) 70'
SH	9	Ross Cronjé	(substituted off) 70'
N8	8	Dan du Preez	(substituted off) 76'
OF	7	Pieter-Steph du Toit
BF	6	Siya Kolisi
RL	5	Lood de Jager
LL	4	Eben Etzebeth (c)	(substituted off) 40'
TP	3	Wilco Louw	(substituted off) 68'
HK	2	Malcolm Marx	(substituted off) 70'
LP	1	Steven Kitshoff
Replacements:
HK	16	Bongi Mbonambi	(substituted on) 70'
PR	17	Trevor Nyakane	(substituted on) 68'
PR	18	Ruan Dreyer
FL	19	Oupa Mohojé	(substituted on) 40'
N8	20	Uzair Cassiem	(substituted on) 76'
SH	21	Louis Schreuder	(substituted on) 70'
FH	22	Elton Jantjies	(substituted on) 70'
CE	23	Lukhanyo Am	(substituted on) 76'
Coach:
(South Africa) Allister Coetzee

Man of the Match:
Hadleigh Parkes (Wales)

Touch judges:
Wayne Barnes (England)
Frank Murphy (Ireland)
Television match official:
Rowan Kitt (England)

Notes

- Hadleigh Parkes (Wales) and Lukhanyo Am and Louis Schreuder (both South Africa) made their international debuts.
- Wales retain the Prince William Cup.

== See also ==
- 2017 Cup of Nations
- 2019 Rugby World Cup
- 2017 mid-year rugby union internationals
- End of year rugby union tests
- Mid-year rugby union tests
