= Leo Halavatau =

Tonga international rugby union player

- Born: Leo Halavatau; 21 November 1983 (age 42) Tonga
- Height: 1.80 m (5 ft 11 in)
- Weight: 123 kg (19 st 5 lb)

Rugby union career
- Position: Prop
Senior career
Years	Team	Apps	(Points)
- Birmingham & Solihull
2011–2016	London Irish	62	(10)
2016-	Soyaux Angoulême XV Charente		
- Correct as of 28 February 2014
International career
Years	Team	Apps	(Points)
2017	Tonga	1	(0)
- Correct as of 25 November 2017

Leo Halavatau (born 21 November 1983) is a Tongan rugby union player.

Leo joined the Sunbry-based Aviva Premiership outfit from the former Championship side Birmingham & Solihull for the start of the 2011/12 season. He made his debut for the club, coming off the bench to replace Faan Rautenbach in the London Double Header fixture against Harlequins at the start of that season, before earning his first start the following week against Sale Sharks. Leo went on to make 11 appearances for the club in his first season, and November 2012 signed a 3-year contract extension, keeping him at the club until the end of the 2015/16 season.

With injuries to fellow tightheads during the 2013/14 season Halavatau has featured in all but one of the exiles matchday squads, earning plaudits for both his workrate around the park and his scrummaging. Leo has had experiences with playing back row. He made his 100th appearance for London Irish in December 2015. He was released by London Irish in 2016.

In 2021 he moved to Chatres Rugby. In March 2022 he signed a one-year contract extension.
