= Baptiste Chouzenoux =

French professional rugby union player

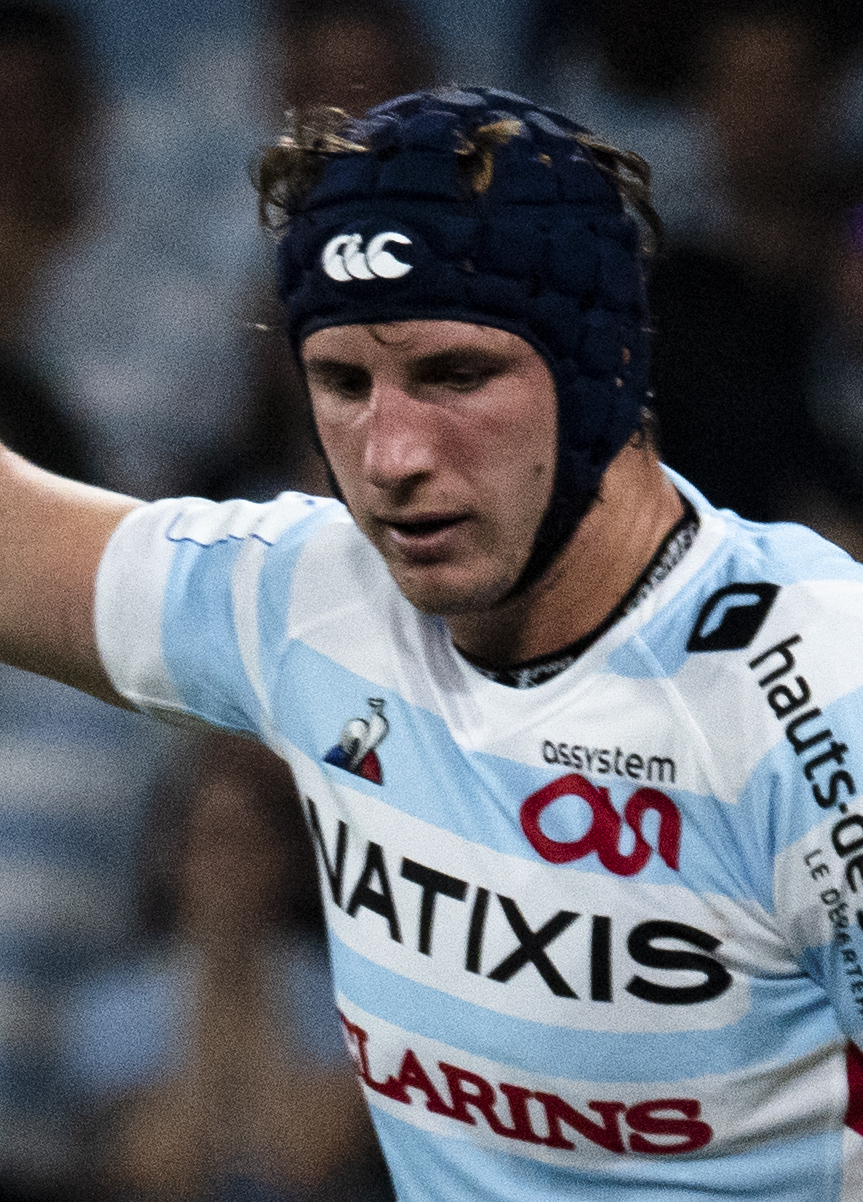
- Baptiste Chouzenoux playing for Racing 92 against Saracens on 17 November 2019
- Born: Baptiste Chouzenoux; 7 August 1993 (age 33) Bayonne, France
- Height: 2.01 m (6 ft 7 in)
- Weight: 107 kg (16 st 12 lb)

Rugby union career
- Position: Flanker
- Current team: Racing 92
Senior career
Years	Team	Apps	(Points)
2014–2017	Bayonne	51	(20)
2017–	Racing 92	25	(5)
- Correct as of 12 May 2018

Baptiste Chouzenoux (born 7 August 1993) is a French professional rugby union player. He plays at flanker for Racing 92 in the Top 14.
