= Hisa Sasagi =

Yoshihisa Sasagi
- Born: 29 June 1987 (age 39) Motootua, Samoa
- Height: 1.86 m (6 ft 1 in)
- Weight: 127 kg (20 st 0 lb; 280 lb)
- School: Otago Boys' High School

Rugby union career
- Position: Prop
Provincial / State sides
| Years | Team | Apps | (Points) |
| 2012– | Otago | 25 | (0) |
- Correct as of 28 October 2016
Super Rugby
| Years | Team | Apps | (Points) |
| 2019 | Blues | 1 | |
International career
| Years | Team | Apps | (Points) |
| 2016 | Samoa | 4 | (0) |
- Correct as of 25 November 2017

Yoshihisa "Hisa" Sasagi (born 29 June 1987) is a Samoan rugby union player who currently plays as a prop for Otago in the ITM Cup. Despite debuting for the Razorbacks in 2012 it was not until 2015 when he finally established himself as a regular starter. His performances in helping Otago reach the championship semi-finals saw him named as a member of the Hurricanes wider training group ahead of the 2016 Super Rugby season. Hisa made his debut for the Blues against the hurricanes in round 18 of the 2019 Investec Super Rugby Season, becoming Blues number 303.

Sasagi was born in Samoa but came to Dunedin as a child when his father attended the University of Otago.
