= Martin Devergie =

French rugby union player

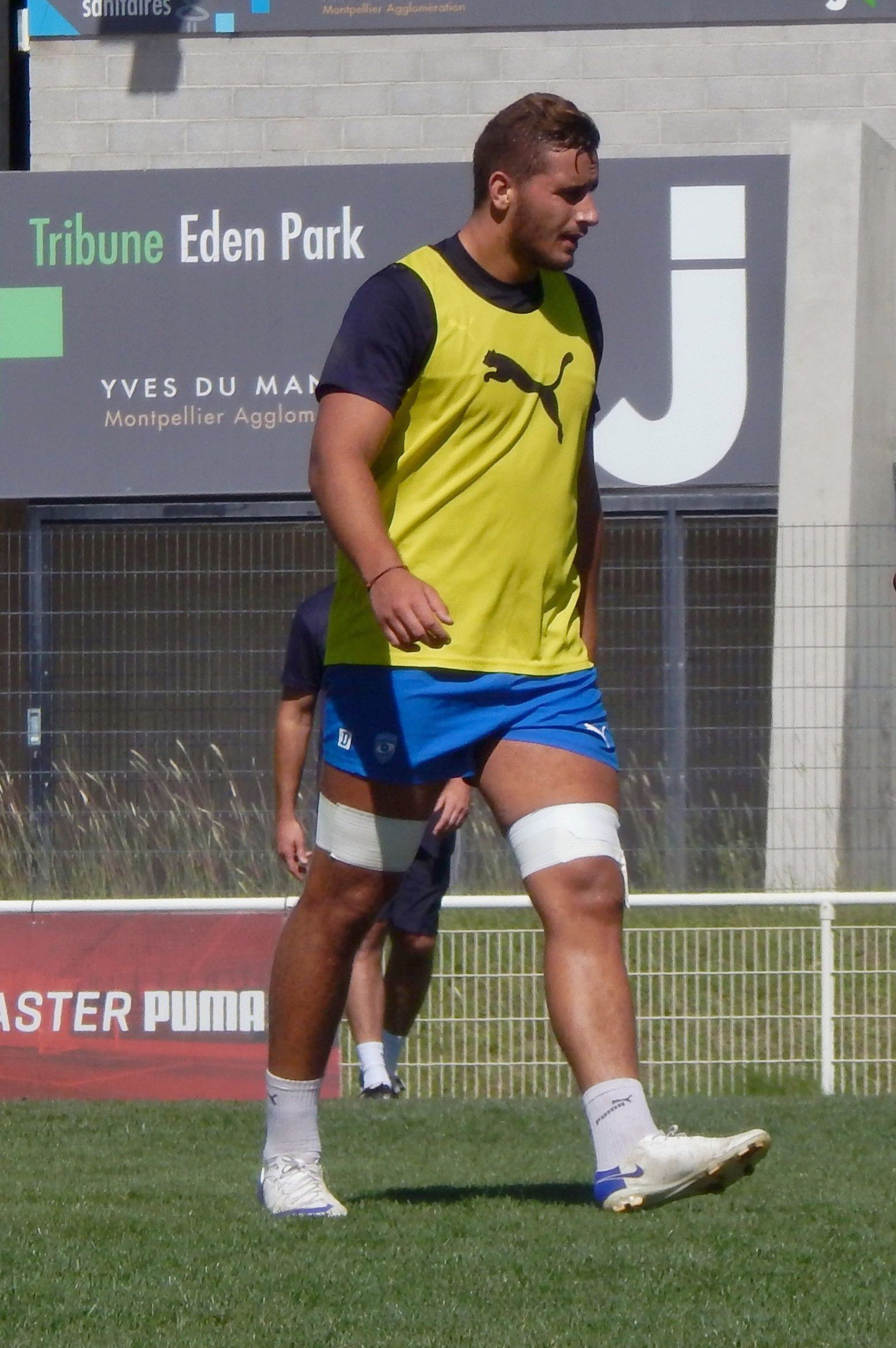
- Born: 26 June 1995 (age 31)
- Height: 6 ft 4 in (193 cm)
- Occupation: Back row

Rugby union career
Senior career
Years	Team	Apps	(Points)
–	Montpellier Hérault Rugby		

Martin Devergie (born 26 June 1995) is a French rugby union player playing at the 3rd line center position in the Montpellier Hérault Rugby squad. He is the son of former international rugby player Thierry Devergie, who played at RC Nîmes and FC Grenoble.

== Biography ==
After having made some meetings with the MHR during the 2015-2016 season, Martin Devergie was loaned for the 2016-2017 season in Colomiers, a Pro D2 club. In March 2017, he signed a 3-year contract with the Montpellier Hérault Rugby.

In November 2017, he was selected with the French Barbarians to face the Maori All Blacks at the Stade Chaban-Delmas in Bordeaux; the Baa-Baas won 19 to 15.

== National Team Statistics ==
- Selections with the France Under 20 team
- Selections with the France Under-19 team
- Selections with the France Under-18 team
