= Rory Sutherland (rugby union) =

Scottish rugby union player (born 1992)

- Born: 24 August 1992 (age 34) Hawick, Scottish Borders, Scotland
- Height: 1.83 m (6 ft 0 in)
- Weight: 113 kg (249 lb; 17 st 11 lb)
- School: Hawick High School

Rugby union career
- Position: Loosehead Prop
Amateur team(s)
Years	Team	Apps	(Points)
2011-12	Hawick		
2012-13	Biggar		
2013-14	Gala		
Senior career
Years	Team	Apps	(Points)
2014–21	Edinburgh	99	(10)
2021–22	Worcester Warriors	14	(5)
2022–23	Ulster	12	(0)
2023–24	Oyonnax	11	(0)
2024–	Glasgow Warriors	16	(0)
International career
Years	Team	Apps	(Points)
2016–	Scotland	55	(0)
2021, 2025	British & Irish Lions	2	(0)
2026	Scotland 'A'	1	(0)
- Correct as of 18 November 2026

Rory Sutherland (born 24 August 1992) is a Scotland international rugby union player who plays as a prop for Glasgow Warriors. He previously played for Oyonnax, Ulster Rugby, Worcester Warriors and Edinburgh Rugby.

== Early life ==
Sutherland is a former Trinity Primary and Hawick High School pupil.

Sutherland came through the ranks with his hometown club and school sides before representing the Borders and Scotland at under-17 and under-18 in the back-row.

== Club career ==
He switched to loose-head prop during his first season of senior rugby at Hawick and, after a season with Biggar, caught the attention of RBS Premiership runners-up and Border League winners Gala.

In 2017, Sutherland suffered a serious adductor injury that threatened his career and required him to spend time in a wheelchair.

While on the 2021 British & Irish Lions tour to South Africa it was announced that Sutherland would join Worcester Warriors ahead of the 2021/22 season. On 5 October 2022 all Warriors players had their contracts terminated due to the liquidation of the company to which they were employed. Following the termination of his Worcester Warriors contract, Sutherland signed a short-term contract with Ulster. He left Ulster at the end of the season. After the 2023 Rugby World Cup he joined Oyonnax on a one-year contract to play in the French Top 14.

He joined reigning United Rugby Championship side Glasgow Warriors for season 2024-25. He made his competitive debut on 27 September 2024 against Benetton Rugby for the Glasgow side, becoming Glasgow Warrior No. 362.

== International career ==
=== Scotland ===
Sutherland received his first call up to the senior Scotland squad by coach Vern Cotter on 19 January 2016 for the 2016 Six Nations Championship. Sutherland got his first Scotland cap during the Six Nations against Ireland in 2016. By 2021, he had made 18 appearances for Scotland, 16 as a starter and two as a replacement.

In 2023 Sutherland was selected in Scotland's 33 player squad for the 2023 Rugby World Cup in France.

He played for Scotland 'A' on 6 February 2026 in their match against Italy XV.

=== British & Irish Lions ===
In May 2021, Sutherland was selected in the 37-man squad for the British and Irish Lions tour of South Africa. He took to the field in the opening warmup match against Japan at Murrayfield, becoming Lion #840. After strong performances in the tour's warm-up matches, he was selected on the substitutes' bench for the first Test but was subsequently elevated to the starting line up just hours before kick-off. He played 55 minutes as the Lions won 17–22 to lead the series. Then he came off the bench the following week for his second Test cap.

He was not selected in the initial squad for the 2025 British & Irish Lions tour to Australia, but was subsequently called up ahead of the test series getting underway. He made an appearance in the final midweek match against the Pasifika XV.

== Personal life ==
Sutherland is married and they have three children.
