= 2021 British & Irish Lions tour to South Africa =

International rugby union tour

- Date: 26 June – 7 August 2021
- Coach: (New Zealand) Warren Gatland
- Tour captain(s): (Wales) Alun Wyn Jones (Ireland) Conor Murray (temporary) (Note: Murray replaced Jones as tour captain after Jones was injured.)
- Top point scorer: (Wales) Dan Biggar (47)
- Top try scorer: (Wales) Josh Adams (8)
Summary
P	W	D	L
Total
9	6	0	3
Test match
3	1	0	2
Opponent
P	W	D	L
South Africa
3	1	0	2

Tour chronology
- ← New Zealand 2017 Australia 2025 →

The 2021 British & Irish Lions tour to South Africa was an international rugby union tour that took place in South Africa in July and August 2021. The British & Irish Lions, a team selected from players eligible to represent England, Ireland, Scotland or Wales, played a three-match test series against South Africa, and tour matches against three of South Africa's four United Rugby Championship teams and South Africa A.

The COVID-19 pandemic significantly disrupted the tour, leading to numerous schedule changes and the matches in South Africa taking place without fans present. Before leaving for South Africa, the Lions beat Japan in a warm-up match at Murrayfield Stadium in Edinburgh. They won all of their matches against the South African franchises, but lost to South Africa A.

South Africa won the test series by two matches to one. The Lions won the first test 22–17 on 24 July, but South Africa won the second test 27–9 a week later before winning the third test 19–16 with a late penalty on 7 August.

Warren Gatland was the Lions' head coach, making him only the second coach to lead the team on three consecutive tours. (Note: Gatland was also an assistant coach in 2009, making this his fourth tour.) Alun Wyn Jones of Wales was the Lions' tour captain, but was injured in the home match against Japan on 26 June; he initially withdrew from the squad before returning three weeks later. Ireland's Conor Murray took over as captain during Jones' absence.

== Schedule ==
The eight-match schedule was announced on 4 December 2019, and confirmed on 14 May 2021. The Lions also scheduled a home match against Japan for 26 June, the first time the teams had met, and the first game to be hosted by the Lions since they played Argentina at the Millennium Stadium in 2005. Unlike recent tours, when the Lions played seven games against non-national teams, in 2021 there are only five.

Due to the uncertainty of the COVID-19 pandemic, it was reported in early 2021 that the tour could be held in Britain and Ireland instead of South Africa, postponed to 2022 or cancelled altogether. With the Lions traditionally being a touring side, thousands of fans signed a petition to put pressure on the Lions board to keep the tour in South Africa and postpone until 2022. In January 2021, Rugby Australia offered to host the tournament in Australia if it could not be held in South Africa, but this was rejected. In March 2021, it was confirmed that the tour would go ahead as planned.

Originally, the eight matches were to be played in the home stadiums of the Lions' opponents. Due to COVID, the schedule was changed so that all eight matches would be played in only four venues, all in Gauteng or Cape Town, to reduce the teams' travel requirements. A match against an SA Invitational team was replaced by one against the South African Lions franchise to reduce the risks associated with drawing a squad from around the country. The match against the Bulls was cancelled due to several positive COVID tests in the Bulls' camp, and a second match against the Sharks was added instead. On 20 July, it was announced that the second and third tests would be moved from Johannesburg to Cape Town.

Date	Home team	Score	Away team	Venue	Details	Result
26 June	British & Irish Lions	28–10	Japan	Murrayfield Stadium, Edinburgh	Match details	Win
3 July	Lions	14–56	British & Irish Lions	Ellis Park Stadium, Johannesburg	Match details	Win
7 July	Sharks	7–54	British & Irish Lions	Ellis Park Stadium, Johannesburg	Match details	Win
10 July	Sharks	31–71	British & Irish Lions	Loftus Versfeld Stadium, Pretoria	Match details	Win
14 July	South Africa A	17–13	British & Irish Lions	Cape Town Stadium, Cape Town	Match details	Loss
17 July	Stormers	3–49	British & Irish Lions	Cape Town Stadium, Cape Town	Match details	Win
24 July	South Africa	17–22	British & Irish Lions	Cape Town Stadium, Cape Town	Match details	Win
31 July	South Africa	27–9	British & Irish Lions	Cape Town Stadium, Cape Town	Match details	Loss
7 August	South Africa	19–16	British & Irish Lions	Cape Town Stadium, Cape Town	Match details	Loss

== Venues ==
Cape Town, Western Cape	Johannesburg, Gauteng	Pretoria, Gauteng
Cape Town Stadium	Ellis Park Stadium	Loftus Versfeld Stadium
Capacity: 58,000	Capacity: 62,000	Capacity: 51,762
2021 British & Irish Lions tour to South Africa is located in South Africa

== Squads ==
=== Lions ===
Lions chairman Jason Leonard announced an initial squad of 37 on 6 May 2021, made up of 11 players from England, 10 from Wales, 8 from Ireland and 8 from Scotland.

Prop Andrew Porter withdrew from the squad on 5 June because of a toe injury; he was replaced by Kyle Sinckler.

Rónan Kelleher joined the pre-tour training camp in Jersey to cover for hookers Jamie George and Luke Cowan-Dickie, who had club commitments. Kelleher was not added to the touring squad at the time, but was called up to the squad on 14 July.

On 26 June, tour captain Alun Wyn Jones and Justin Tipuric withdrew from the tour after being injured against Japan; Adam Beard and Josh Navidi were called up as their replacements. On 14 July, Jones returned to the squad, having overcome his shoulder injury.

On 10 July, Marcus Smith was called up as Finn Russell was injured, with Russell remaining on the tour.

Notes: Ages listed are as of the first tour match on 26 June. Player positions are per the Lions' website. Bold denotes that the player was selected for a previous Lions squad. Italic denotes a player that withdrew from the squad following selection.

Player	Position	Date of birth (age)	National team	Club/province	National caps (Lions caps)	Notes
Luke Cowan-Dickie	Hooker	20 June 1993 (aged 28)	England	Exeter Chiefs	31	
**Jamie George**	Hooker	20 October 1990 (aged 30)	England	Saracens	59 (3)	
Rónan Kelleher	Hooker	24 January 1998 (aged 23)	Ireland	Leinster	11	Called up as additional cover
**Ken Owens**	Hooker	3 January 1987 (aged 34)	Wales	Scarlets	82 (2)	
Zander Fagerson	Prop	19 January 1996 (aged 25)	Scotland	Glasgow Warriors	38	
**Tadhg Furlong**	Prop	14 November 1992 (aged 28)	Ireland	Leinster	49 (3)	
Wyn Jones	Prop	26 February 1992 (aged 29)	Wales	Scarlets	35	
Andrew Porter	Prop	16 January 1996 (aged 25)	Ireland	Leinster	37	Withdrew due to injury sustained before tour
**Kyle Sinckler**	Prop	30 March 1993 (aged 28)	England	Bristol Bears	47 (3)	Replaced Andrew Porter
Rory Sutherland	Prop	24 August 1992 (aged 28)	Scotland	Edinburgh	16	
**Mako Vunipola**	Prop	14 January 1991 (aged 30)	England	Saracens	67 (6)	
Adam Beard	Second row	7 January 1996 (aged 25)	Wales	Ospreys	25	Replaced Alun Wyn Jones
Tadhg Beirne	Second row	8 January 1992 (aged 29)	Ireland	Munster	22	
**Iain Henderson**	Second row	21 February 1992 (aged 29)	Ireland	Ulster	63	
Jonny Hill	Second row	8 June 1994 (aged 27)	England	Exeter Chiefs	9	
**Maro Itoje**	Second row	28 October 1994 (aged 26)	England	Saracens	48 (3)	
**Alun Wyn Jones** (c)	Second row	19 September 1985 (aged 35)	Wales	Ospreys	148 (9)	Missed three weeks of the tour due to injury
**Courtney Lawes**	Second row	23 February 1989 (aged 32)	England	Northampton Saints	87 (2)	
Jack Conan	Back row	29 July 1992 (aged 28)	Ireland	Leinster	20	
Tom Curry	Back row	15 June 1998 (aged 23)	England	Sale Sharks	33	
**Taulupe Faletau**	Back row	12 November 1990 (aged 30)	Wales	Bath	86 (4)	
Josh Navidi	Back row	30 December 1990 (aged 30)	Wales	Cardiff Blues	28	Replaced Justin Tipuric
Sam Simmonds	Back row	10 November 1994 (aged 26)	England	Exeter Chiefs	7	
**Justin Tipuric**	Back row	6 August 1989 (aged 31)	Wales	Ospreys	85 (1)	Withdrew due to injury sustained during tour
Hamish Watson	Back row	15 October 1991 (aged 29)	Scotland	Edinburgh	41	
**Gareth Davies**	Scrum-half	18 August 1990 (aged 30)	Wales	Scarlets	62	
**Conor Murray** (c)	Scrum-half	20 April 1989 (aged 32)	Ireland	Munster	89 (5)	Replaced Alun Wyn Jones as tour captain
Ali Price	Scrum-half	12 May 1993 (aged 28)	Scotland	Glasgow Warriors	42	
**Dan Biggar**	Fly-half	16 October 1989 (aged 31)	Wales	Northampton Saints	92	
**Owen Farrell**	Fly-half	24 September 1991 (aged 29)	England	Saracens	93 (4)	
**Finn Russell**	Fly-half	23 September 1992 (aged 28)	Scotland	Racing 92	55	
Marcus Smith	Fly-half	14 February 1999 (aged 22)	England	Harlequins	2	Called up as injury cover for Finn Russell
Bundee Aki	Centre	7 April 1990 (aged 31)	Ireland	Connacht	31	
**Elliot Daly**	Centre	8 October 1992 (aged 28)	England	Saracens	52 (3)	
Chris Harris	Centre	28 December 1990 (aged 30)	Scotland	Gloucester	28	
**Robbie Henshaw**	Centre	12 June 1993 (aged 28)	Ireland	Leinster	52	
Josh Adams	Wing	21 April 1995 (aged 26)	Wales	Cardiff Blues	32	
Louis Rees-Zammit	Wing	2 February 2001 (aged 20)	Wales	Gloucester	9	
Duhan van der Merwe	Wing	4 June 1995 (aged 26)	Scotland	Edinburgh	10	
**Anthony Watson**	Wing	26 February 1994 (aged 27)	England	Bath	51 (3)	
**Stuart Hogg**	Full back	24 June 1992 (aged 29)	Scotland	Exeter Chiefs	85	
**Liam Williams**	Full back	9 April 1991 (aged 30)	Wales	Scarlets	71 (3)	

==== Management and staff ====
Reported candidates to coach the 2021 Lions included Warren Gatland, Eddie Jones, Gregor Townsend, Joe Schmidt, Dai Young and Mark McCall. Gatland was announced as the head coach on 12 June 2019.

On 13 April 2021, Gatland announced his coaching team, including Scotland head coach Gregor Townsend as attack coach, Scotland defence coach Steve Tandy, Leinster forwards coach Robin McBryde and Wales kicking coach Neil Jenkins. This was the sixth tour for Jenkins (two as a player, four as a coach), for Townsend, Tandy and McBryde this is their first Lions tour as coaches.

Role	Name	
Management
Chief executive	Steve Brown	Steve Brown
Managing director	Ben Calveley	Ben Calveley
Chairman/Team manager	Jason Leonard	Jason Leonard
Coaches
Role	Name	Union/Club
Head coach	(New Zealand) Warren Gatland	(New Zealand) Chiefs
Assistant coach (attack)	(Scotland) Gregor Townsend	Scotland
Assistant coach (forwards)	(Wales) Robin McBryde	(Ireland) Leinster
Assistant coach (defence)	(Wales) Steve Tandy	Scotland
Assistant coach (kicking)	(Wales) Neil Jenkins	Wales
Performance staff
Head of medical	Prabhat Mathema	Wales
Doctor	Dr Geoff Davies	Wales
Doctor	Dr Ciaran Cosgrove	Ireland
Physiotherapist	Bob Stewart	England
Physiotherapist	John Miles	Wales
Soft tissue therapist	Ann-Marie Birmingham	England
Soft tissue therapist	Hanlie Fouche	Wales
Head of strength & conditioning	Paul Stridgeon	Wales
Strength & conditioning coach	Jon Clarke	England
Strength & conditioning coach	Huw Bennett	Wales
Sports scientist	Brian Cunniffe	English Institute of Sport
Head of analysis	Rhodri Bown	Wales
Analyst	Vinny Hammond	Ireland
Analyst	Marc Kinnaird	Wales
Analyst	Gavin Vaughan	Scotland
Head of Communications	Tim Percival	England

=== South Africa ===
On 5 June, South Africa named a 46-man squad for their two-test series against Georgia and the three tests against the British & Irish Lions.

On 10 July, Lizo Gqoboka and Fez Mbatha were added to the squad as COVID-19 cover.

Coaching team:

- Head coach: (South Africa) Jacques Nienaber
- Forwards coach: (South Africa) Deon Davids
- Backs coach: (South Africa) Mzwandile Stick
- Assistant coach: (Ireland) Felix Jones
- Assistant coach: (South Africa) Daan Human

Note: Ages, caps and clubs as of first test match on 24 July 2021.

Player	Position	Date of birth (age)	Caps	Club/province
Joseph Dweba	Hooker	25 October 1995 (aged 25)	0	(France) Bordeaux Bègles
Malcolm Marx	Hooker	13 July 1994 (aged 27)	34	(Japan) Kubota Spears
Fez Mbatha	Hooker	2 August 1999 (aged 21)	0	(South Africa) Sharks
Bongi Mbonambi	Hooker	7 January 1991 (aged 30)	37	(South Africa) Stormers
Scarra Ntubeni	Hooker	18 February 1991 (aged 30)	1	(South Africa) Stormers
Thomas du Toit	Prop	5 May 1995 (aged 26)	12	(South Africa) Sharks
Lizo Gqoboka	Prop	24 March 1990 (aged 31)	2	(South Africa) Bulls
Steven Kitshoff	Prop	10 February 1992 (aged 29)	48	(South Africa) Stormers
Vincent Koch	Prop	13 March 1990 (aged 31)	21	(England) Saracens
Frans Malherbe	Prop	14 March 1991 (aged 30)	39	(South Africa) Stormers
Ox Nché	Prop	23 July 1995 (aged 26)	2	(South Africa) Sharks
Trevor Nyakane	Prop	4 May 1989 (aged 32)	43	(South Africa) Bulls
Coenie Oosthuizen	Prop	22 March 1989 (aged 32)	30	(England) Sale Sharks
Lood de Jager	Lock	17 December 1992 (aged 28)	45	(England) Sale Sharks
Eben Etzebeth	Lock	29 October 1991 (aged 29)	86	(France) Toulon
Nico Janse van Rensburg	Lock	6 May 1994 (aged 27)	0	(France) Montpellier
Franco Mostert	Lock	27 November 1990 (aged 30)	40	(Japan) Honda Heat
Marvin Orie	Lock	2 June 1993 (aged 27)	4	(South Africa) Stormers
RG Snyman	Lock	29 January 1995 (aged 26)	23	(Ireland) Munster
Dan du Preez	Loose forward	5 August 1995 (aged 26)	4	(England) Sale Sharks
Jean-Luc du Preez	Loose forward	5 August 1995 (aged 25)	13	(England) Sale Sharks
Pieter-Steph du Toit	Loose forward	20 August 1992 (aged 28)	56	(South Africa) Stormers
Rynhardt Elstadt	Loose forward	20 December 1989 (aged 31)	2	(France) Toulouse
Siya Kolisi (c)	Loose forward	16 June 1991 (aged 30)	51	(South Africa) Sharks
Kwagga Smith	Loose forward	11 June 1996 (aged 25)	7	(Japan) Yamaha Júbilo
Marco van Staden	Loose forward	25 August 1995 (aged 25)	3	(South Africa) Bulls
Duane Vermeulen	Loose forward	3 July 1986 (aged 35)	54	(South Africa) Bulls
Jasper Wiese	Loose forward	21 October 1995 (aged 25)	1	(England) Leicester Tigers
Faf de Klerk	Scrum-half	19 October 1991 (aged 29)	30	(England) Sale Sharks
Herschel Jantjies	Scrum-half	22 April 1996 (aged 25)	11	(South Africa) Stormers
Sanele Nohamba	Scrum-half	19 January 1999 (aged 22)	0	(South Africa) Sharks
Cobus Reinach	Scrum-half	7 February 1990 (aged 31)	15	(France) Montpellier
Elton Jantjies	Fly-half	1 August 1990 (aged 30)	38	(France) Pau
Handré Pollard	Fly-half	11 March 1994 (aged 27)	49	(France) Montpellier
Morné Steyn	Fly-half	11 July 1984 (aged 37)	66	(South Africa) Bulls
Lukhanyo Am	Centre	28 November 1993 (aged 27)	15	(South Africa) Sharks
Damian de Allende	Centre	25 November 1991 (aged 29)	47	(Ireland) Munster
Jesse Kriel	Centre	15 February 1994 (aged 27)	47	(Japan) Canon Eagles
Wandisile Simelane	Centre	21 March 1998 (aged 23)	0	(South Africa) Lions
François Steyn	Centre	14 May 1987 (aged 34)	68	(South Africa) Cheetahs
Cheslin Kolbe	Wing	28 October 1993 (aged 27)	14	(France) Toulouse
Makazole Mapimpi	Wing	26 July 1990 (aged 30)	14	(South Africa) Sharks
Sbu Nkosi	Wing	21 January 1996 (aged 25)	11	(South Africa) Sharks
Yaw Penxe	Wing	3 April 1997 (aged 24)	0	(South Africa) Sharks
Rosko Specman	Wing	28 April 1989 (aged 32)	1	(South Africa) Cheetahs
Aphelele Fassi	Fullback	23 January 1998 (aged 23)	1	(South Africa) Sharks
Willie le Roux	Fullback	18 August 1989 (aged 31)	62	(Japan) Toyota Verblitz
Damian Willemse	Fullback	7 May 1998 (aged 23)	7	(South Africa) Stormers

== Matches ==
=== British & Irish Lions v Japan ===
The Lions began their 2021 tour with their first ever match in Scotland. Lions captain Alun Wyn Jones was substituted in the 7th minute after suffering a dislocated shoulder that seemed to rule him out of the tour. The Lions went 21–0 up in the first 23 minutes, through tries from Josh Adams, Duhan van der Merwe and Robbie Henshaw, all converted by Dan Biggar, but also lost flanker Justin Tipuric to a shoulder injury in the 21st minute. Tadhg Beirne added a fourth try after half-time, again converted by Biggar to make it 28–0. Japan responded with a try by Kazuki Himeno after 58 minutes, converted by Yu Tamura, who also kicked a penalty with 12 minutes to go to make the final score 28–10. The British & Irish Lions Board later stated that this was not a Lions Test match, and classed it as "an international fixture", but each Lions player received a cap and each debutant was awarded a Lions number.

26 June 2021
15:00 BST (UTC+01)

British & Irish Lions	28–10	Japan
Try: Adams 11' c Van der Merwe 17' c Henshaw 22' c Beirne 48' c Con: Biggar (4/4) 13', 18', 23', 48'	Report	Try: Himeno 58' c Con: Tamura (1/1) 60'; Pen: Tamura (1/2) 68'

Murrayfield Stadium, Edinburgh
Attendance: 16,500
Referee: Pascal Gaüzère (France)

Team details

FB	15	(Wales) Liam Williams	(substituted off) 64'
RW	14	(Wales) Josh Adams
OC	13	(Ireland) Robbie Henshaw
IC	12	(Ireland) Bundee Aki	(substituted off) 54'
LW	11	(Scotland) Duhan van der Merwe
FH	10	(Wales) Dan Biggar
SH	9	(Ireland) Conor Murray	(substituted off) 60'
N8	8	(Ireland) Jack Conan
OF	7	(Wales) Justin Tipuric	(substituted off) 21'
BF	6	(Ireland) Tadhg Beirne
RL	5	(Wales) Alun Wyn Jones (c)	(substituted off) 7'
LL	4	(Ireland) Iain Henderson
TP	3	(Ireland) Tadhg Furlong	(substituted off) 50'
HK	2	(Wales) Ken Owens	(substituted off) 54'
LP	1	(Scotland) Rory Sutherland	(substituted off) 50'
Replacements:
HK	16	(England) Jamie George	(substituted on) 54'
PR	17	(Wales) Wyn Jones	(substituted on) 50'
PR	18	(England) Kyle Sinckler	(substituted on) 50'
LK	19	(England) Courtney Lawes	(substituted on) 7'
N8	20	(Wales) Taulupe Faletau	(substituted on) 21'
SH	21	(Scotland) Ali Price	(substituted on) 60'
FH	22	(England) Owen Farrell	(substituted on) 54'
WG	23	(England) Anthony Watson	(substituted on) 64'
Coach:
(New Zealand) Warren Gatland

FB	15	Ryohei Yamanaka
RW	14	Kotaro Matsushima
OC	13	Timothy Lafaele
IC	12	Ryoto Nakamura
LW	11	Siosaia Fifita
FH	10	Yu Tamura
SH	9	Kaito Shigeno	(substituted off) 49'
N8	8	Amanaki Mafi	(substituted off) 49'
OF	7	Lappies Labuschagné
BF	6	Michael Leitch (c)	(substituted off) 49'
RL	5	James Moore
LL	4	Wimpie van der Walt	(substituted off) 60'
TP	3	Koo Ji-won	(substituted off) 49'
HK	2	Atsushi Sakate
LP	1	Keita Inagaki	(substituted off) 53'
Replacements:
HK	16	Kosuke Horikoshi
PR	17	Craig Millar	(substituted on) 53'
PR	18	Asaeli Ai Valu	(substituted on) 49'
FL	19	Jack Cornelsen	(substituted on) 60'
FL	20	Kazuki Himeno	(substituted on) 49'
N8	21	Tevita Tatafu	(substituted on) 49'
SH	22	Naoto Saito	(substituted on) 49'
FH	23	Rikiya Matsuda
Coach:
(New Zealand) Jamie Joseph

Player of the Match:
Dan Biggar (British & Irish Lions)

Assistant referees:
Pierre Brousset (France)
Ludovic Cayre (France)
Television match official:
Eric Gauzins (France)

Notes:

- Hamish Watson and Zander Fagerson (British & Irish Lions) were named to start, but were withdrawn in the days leading up to the game due to injuries to the head and back respectively. Justin Tipuric replaced Watson, while Tadhg Furlong was promoted from the bench to replace Fagerson; Kyle Sinckler replaced Furlong on the bench.
- No replacement was made for Jack Conan.
- Jack Cornelsen, Siosaia Fifita, Craig Millar and Naoto Saito (all Japan) made their international debuts.
- Japan became the eighth test nation to play the Lions.
- Josh Adams, Bundee Aki, Tadhg Beirne, Jack Conan, Wyn Jones, Ali Price, Rory Sutherland and Duhan van der Merwe all made their Lions debuts.

=== Lions v British & Irish Lions ===
3 July 2021
18:00 SAST (UTC+02)

Lions	14–56	British & Irish Lions
Try: V. Tshituka 34' c Maxwane 43' c Con: Hendrikse (2/2) 35', 44'	Report	Try: Rees-Zammit 3' c H. Watson 6' c Price 32' c Adams (4) 41' c, 53' c, 67' c, 71' c Davies 65' c Con: Farrell (8/8) 4', 7', 33', 41', 55', 66', 68', 72'

Ellis Park Stadium, Johannesburg
Attendance: 0
Referee: AJ Jacobs (South Africa)

Team details

FB	15	EW Viljoen
RW	14	Jamba Ulengo
OC	13	Mannie Rass
IC	12	Burger Odendaal	(substituted off) 55'
LW	11	Rabz Maxwane
FH	10	Jordan Hendrikse	(substituted off) 66'
SH	9	Dillon Smit	(substituted off) 39'	(substituted on) 40'	(substituted off) 55'
N8	8	Francke Horn (c)
BF	7	Vincent Tshituka
OF	6	Sibusiso Sangweni	(substituted off) 66'
RL	5	Reinhard Nothnagel	(substituted off) 69'
LL	4	Ruben Schoeman
TP	3	Ruan Dreyer	(substituted off) 55'
HK	2	PJ Botha	(substituted off) 55'
LP	1	Nathan McBeth	(substituted off) 55'
Replacements:
HK	16	Jaco Visagie	(substituted on) 55'
PR	17	Sti Sithole	(substituted on) 55'
PR	18	Carlü Sadie	(substituted on) 55'
LK	19	Ruhan Straeuli	(substituted on) 66'
FL	20	Emmanuel Tshituka	(substituted on) 69'
SH	21	Morné van den Berg	(substituted on) 39'	(substituted off) 40'	(substituted on) 55'
FH	22	Fred Zeilinga	(substituted on) 55'
CE	23	Dan Kriel	(substituted on) 66'
Coach:
(South Africa) Ivan van Rooyen

FB	15	(Scotland) Stuart Hogg (c)
RW	14	(Wales) Louis Rees-Zammit
OC	13	(Scotland) Chris Harris	(substituted off) 69'
IC	12	(England) Owen Farrell
LW	11	(Wales) Josh Adams
FH	10	(Scotland) Finn Russell	(substituted off) 60'
SH	9	(Scotland) Ali Price	(substituted off) 60'
N8	8	(Wales) Taulupe Faletau	(substituted off) 55'
OF	7	(Scotland) Hamish Watson
BF	6	(England) Courtney Lawes
RL	5	(England) Jonny Hill
LL	4	(England) Maro Itoje	(substituted off) 69'
TP	3	(England) Kyle Sinckler	(substituted off) 55'
HK	2	(England) Jamie George	(substituted off) 69'
LP	1	(Wales) Wyn Jones	(substituted off) 55'
Replacements:
HK	16	(England) Luke Cowan-Dickie	(substituted on) 69'
PR	17	(England) Mako Vunipola	(substituted on) 55'
PR	18	(Scotland) Zander Fagerson	(substituted on) 55'
LK	19	(Ireland) Iain Henderson	(substituted on) 69'
N8	20	(England) Sam Simmonds	(substituted on) 55'
SH	21	(Wales) Gareth Davies	(substituted on) 60'
CE	22	(Ireland) Bundee Aki	(substituted on) 69'
CE	23	(England) Elliot Daly	(substituted on) 60'
Coach:
(New Zealand) Warren Gatland

Player of the Match:
Hamish Watson (British & Irish Lions)

Assistant referees:
Wayne Barnes (England)
Jaco Peyper (South Africa)
Television match official:
Stuart Berry (South Africa)

=== Sharks v British & Irish Lions ===
7 July 2021
20:00 SAST (UTC+02)

Sharks	7–54	British & Irish Lions
Try: Venter 50' c Con: Bosch (1/1) 50'	Report	Try: Adams (3) 2' c, 56' c, 77' c Van der Merwe (3) 6' c, 25' m, 73' c Aki 38' c Rees-Zammit 60' c Con: Farrell (3/4) 3', 6', 40'; Russell (4/4) 57', 61', 74', 79'

Ellis Park Stadium, Johannesburg
Attendance: 0
Referee: Jaco Peyper (South Africa)

Team details

FB	15	Manie Libbok		(substituted off) 62'
RW	14	Werner Kok	(yellow card) 20' to 30'
OC	13	Jeremy Ward
IC	12	Marius Louw
LW	11	Thaakir Abrahams
FH	10	Curwin Bosch
SH	9	Jaden Hendrikse		(substituted off) 67'
N8	8	Phepsi Buthelezi (c)
BF	7	Thembelani Bholi		(substituted off) 55'
OF	6	James Venter
RL	5	Hyron Andrews		(substituted off) 8'
LL	4	Ruben van Heerden		(substituted off) 61'
TP	3	Khutha Mchunu		(substituted off) 45'
HK	2	Fez Mbatha		(substituted off) 55'
LP	1	Khwezi Mona		(substituted off) 45'
Replacements:
HK	16	Kerron van Vuuren		(substituted on) 55'
PR	17	Ntuthuko Mchunu		(substituted on) 45'
PR	18	Wiehahn Herbst		(substituted on) 45'
LK	19	JJ van der Mescht		(substituted on) 61'
LK	20	Reniel Hugo		(substituted on) 8'
FL	21	Dylan Richardson		(substituted on) 55'
SH	22	Grant Williams		(substituted on) 67'
WG	23	Anthony Volmink		(substituted on) 62'
Coach:
(South Africa) Sean Everitt

FB	15	(Wales) Josh Adams
RW	14	(Wales) Louis Rees-Zammit
OC	13	(England) Elliot Daly
IC	12	(Ireland) Bundee Aki
LW	11	(Scotland) Duhan van der Merwe
FH	10	(England) Owen Farrell	(substituted off) 51'
SH	9	(Scotland) Ali Price
N8	8	(England) Sam Simmonds	(substituted off) 61'
OF	7	(England) Tom Curry	(substituted off) 61'
BF	6	(Wales) Josh Navidi	(substituted off) 71'
RL	5	(Wales) Adam Beard
LL	4	(Ireland) Iain Henderson (c)	(substituted off) 67'
TP	3	(Scotland) Zander Fagerson	(substituted off) 51'
HK	2	(England) Luke Cowan-Dickie	(substituted off) 55'
LP	1	(England) Mako Vunipola	(substituted off) 51'
Replacements:
HK	16	(Wales) Ken Owens	(substituted on) 55'
PR	17	(Scotland) Rory Sutherland	(substituted on) 51'
PR	18	(Ireland) Tadhg Furlong	(substituted on) 51'
LK	19	(England) Maro Itoje	(substituted on) 67'
N8	20	(Ireland) Jack Conan	(substituted on) 61'
FL	21	(Scotland) Hamish Watson	(substituted on) 71'
FH	22	(Scotland) Finn Russell	(substituted on) 51'
N8	23	(Wales) Taulupe Faletau	(substituted on) 61'
Coach:
(New Zealand) Warren Gatland

Player of the Match:
Duhan van der Merwe (British & Irish Lions)

Assistant referees:
Wayne Barnes (England)
AJ Jacobs (South Africa)
Television match official:
Marius van der Westhuizen (South Africa)

Notes:

- Dan Biggar, Gareth Davies, Anthony Watson, Liam Williams (all starting XV), Tadhg Beirne, Chris Harris, Stuart Hogg and Conor Murray (all replacements) were named in the Lions team, but were removed prior to the match, after either testing positive for COVID-19 or having close contact with a tour member who tested positive. They were replaced by Josh Adams, Taulupe Faletau, Owen Farrell, Maro Itoje, Ali Price, Finn Russell, Louis Rees-Zammit and Hamish Watson.

=== Sharks v British & Irish Lions ===
10 July 2021
18:00 SAST (UTC+02)

Sharks	31–71	British & Irish Lions
Try: Volmink (2) 10' c, 35' c Abrahams 14' m Hendrikse 23' c Kok 52' m Con: Cronjé (3/5) 11', 24', 36'	Report	Try: Harris 4' c George (2) 20' m, 54' c Van der Merwe 25' c Beirne (2) 38' c, 63' c Conan 47' m Daly 50' c A. Watson (2) 58' c, 79' m Curry 66' c Con: Biggar (8/10) 5', 26', 39', 51', 55', 58', 64', 66'

Loftus Versfeld Stadium, Pretoria
Attendance: 0
Referee: Wayne Barnes (England)

Team details

FB	15	Anthony Volmink
RW	14	Marnus Potgieter
OC	13	Werner Kok
IC	12	Murray Koster		(substituted off) 65'
LW	11	Thaakir Abrahams
FH	10	Lionel Cronjé		(substituted off) 59'
SH	9	Jaden Hendrikse	(red card) 45'
N8	8	Phepsi Buthelezi (c)		(substituted off) 59'
BF	7	Mpilo Gumede		(substituted off) 49'
OF	6	Dylan Richardson
RL	5	Reniel Hugo
LL	4	Le Roux Roets		(substituted off) 49'
TP	3	Wiehahn Herbst		(substituted off) 53'
HK	2	Kerron van Vuuren		(substituted off) 59'
LP	1	Ntuthuko Mchunu		(substituted off) 51'
Replacements:
HK	16	Dan Jooste		(substituted on) 59'
PR	17	Mzamo Majola		(substituted on) 51'
PR	18	Khutha Mchunu
FL	19	Thembelani Bholi		(substituted on) 59'
LK	20	Jeandre Labuschagne		(substituted on) 49'
SH	21	Cameron Wright		(substituted on) 49'
FH	22	Boeta Chamberlain		(substituted on) 59'
CE	23	Jeremy Ward
PR	24	Lourens Adriaanse		(substituted on) 53'
CE	25	Rynhardt Jonker		(substituted on) 65'
FH	26	Curwin Bosch
Coach:
(South Africa) Sean Everitt

FB	15	(Wales) Liam Williams
RW	14	(England) Anthony Watson
OC	13	(England) Elliot Daly
IC	12	(Scotland) Chris Harris		(substituted off) 67'
LW	11	(Scotland) Duhan van der Merwe
FH	10	(Wales) Dan Biggar
SH	9	(Wales) Gareth Davies		(substituted off) 46'
N8	8	(Ireland) Jack Conan		(substituted off) 55'
OF	7	(Scotland) Hamish Watson		(substituted off) 59'
BF	6	(Ireland) Tadhg Beirne
RL	5	(England) Jonny Hill
LL	4	(England) Courtney Lawes		(substituted off) 65'
TP	3	(Ireland) Tadhg Furlong		(substituted off) 55'
HK	2	(England) Jamie George (c)		(substituted off) 55'
LP	1	(Scotland) Rory Sutherland		(substituted off) 55'
Replacements:
HK	16	(Wales) Ken Owens		(substituted on) 55'
PR	17	(Wales) Wyn Jones		(substituted on) 55'
PR	18	(England) Kyle Sinckler		(substituted on) 55'
LK	19	(Wales) Adam Beard		(substituted on) 65'
N8	20	(England) Sam Simmonds		(substituted on) 55'
FL	21	(England) Tom Curry		(substituted on) 59'
SH	22	(Ireland) Conor Murray	(yellow card) 75'	(substituted on) 46'
CE	23	(Ireland) Bundee Aki		(substituted on) 67'
Coach:
(New Zealand) Warren Gatland

Player of the Match:
Elliot Daly (British & Irish Lions)

Assistant referees:
Jaco Peyper (South Africa)
AJ Jacobs (South Africa)
Television match official:
Stuart Berry (South Africa)

Notes:

- Maro Itoje (British & Irish Lions) was named to start but withdrew due to illness and was replaced by Courtney Lawes; Adam Beard took Lawes' place on the bench. Finn Russell was named on the bench, but also withdrew due to injury and was replaced by Bundee Aki.
- Jamie George became the first Englishman to captain a British & Irish Lions team since Phil Vickery captained the side against Western Province in 2009.

=== South Africa A v British & Irish Lions ===
14 July 2021
20:00 SAST (UTC+02)

South Africa A	17–13	British & Irish Lions
Try: Nkosi 12' c Am 31' c Con: Steyn (2/2) 13', 33'; Pen: Steyn (1/2) 5'	Report	Try: Jones 43' c Con: Farrell (1/1) 44'; Pen: Farrell (2/2) 27', 50'

Cape Town Stadium, Cape Town
Attendance: 5
Referee: Jaco Peyper (South Africa)

Team details

FB	15	Willie le Roux		(substituted off) 54'
RW	14	Cheslin Kolbe
OC	13	Lukhanyo Am (c)
IC	12	Damian de Allende		(substituted off) 52'
LW	11	Sbu Nkosi
FH	10	Morné Steyn
SH	9	Faf de Klerk	(yellow card) 38' to 48'
N8	8	Jasper Wiese		(substituted off) 72'
BF	7	Pieter-Steph du Toit		(substituted off) 42'
OF	6	Marco van Staden	(yellow card) 39' to 49'	(substituted off) 64'
RL	5	Franco Mostert
LL	4	Eben Etzebeth
TP	3	Trevor Nyakane		(substituted off) 41'
HK	2	Joseph Dweba		(substituted off) 38'
LP	1	Steven Kitshoff		(substituted off) 60'
Replacements:
HK	16	Malcolm Marx		(substituted on) 38'
PR	17	Coenie Oosthuizen		(substituted on) 60'
PR	18	Vincent Koch		(substituted on) 41'
LK	19	Nico Janse van Rensburg		(substituted on) 64'
FL	20	Rynhardt Elstadt		(substituted on) 42'
SH	21	Herschel Jantjies		(substituted on) 72'
CE	22	Jesse Kriel		(substituted on) 54'
CE	23	Damian Willemse		(substituted on) 52'
FL	24	Kwagga Smith
FH	25	Elton Jantjies
Coach:
(South Africa) Rassie Erasmus (Note: South Africa's director of rugby, Rassie Erasmus, coached the South Africa A side in the absence of head coach Jacques Nienaber, who was in isolation after contracting COVID-19.)

FB	15	(Wales) Liam Williams	(substituted off) 14'
RW	14	(Wales) Louis Rees-Zammit
OC	13	(Scotland) Chris Harris
IC	12	(Ireland) Bundee Aki
LW	11	(England) Anthony Watson
FH	10	(England) Owen Farrell
SH	9	(Ireland) Conor Murray (c)	(substituted off) 75'
N8	8	(Wales) Taulupe Faletau	(substituted off) 47'
OF	7	(England) Tom Curry
BF	6	(Wales) Josh Navidi	(substituted off) 69'
RL	5	(Ireland) Iain Henderson	(substituted off) 60'
LL	4	(England) Maro Itoje
TP	3	(England) Kyle Sinckler	(substituted off) 62'
HK	2	(Wales) Ken Owens	(substituted off) 50'
LP	1	(Wales) Wyn Jones	(substituted off) 45'
Replacements:
HK	16	(England) Luke Cowan-Dickie	(substituted on) 50'
PR	17	(England) Mako Vunipola	(substituted on) 45'
PR	18	(Scotland) Zander Fagerson	(substituted on) 62'
LK	19	(Wales) Adam Beard	(substituted on) 60'
FL	20	(Ireland) Tadhg Beirne	(substituted on) 69'
N8	21	(England) Sam Simmonds	(substituted on) 47'
SH	22	(Wales) Gareth Davies	(substituted on) 75'
CE	23	(England) Elliot Daly	(substituted on) 14'
Coach:
(New Zealand) Warren Gatland

Player of the Match:
Cheslin Kolbe (South Africa A)

Assistant referees:
Wayne Barnes (England)
Marius van der Westhuizen (South Africa)
Television match official:
Marius Jonker (South Africa)

Notes

- Josh Adams (British & Irish Lions) was withdrawn from the squad for personal reasons and was replaced by Liam Williams, meaning Anthony Watson shifted from fullback to wing.
- Dan Biggar (British & Irish Lions) was also in the initial XV but was withdrawn from the squad prior to kick-off and replaced by Owen Farrell.

=== Stormers v British & Irish Lions ===
17 July 2021
18:00 SAST (UTC+02)

Stormers	3–49	British & Irish Lions
Pen: Swiel (1/1) 19'	Report	Try: Beard 27' c Cowan-Dickie 33' c Hill 40' c Conan 49' c Fagerson 67' c Rees-Zammit 73' c Simmonds 77' c Con: Smith (7/7) 28', 34', 40', 50', 68', 75', 78'

Cape Town Stadium, Cape Town
Attendance: 0
Referee: Wayne Barnes (England)

Team details

FB	15	Sergeal Petersen
RW	14	Leolin Zas	(substituted off) 61'
OC	13	Juan de Jongh
IC	12	Dan du Plessis	(substituted off) 65'
LW	11	Edwill van der Merwe
FH	10	Tim Swiel	(substituted off) 48'
SH	9	Godlen Masimla
N8	8	Evan Roos	(substituted off) 65'
BF	7	Johan du Toit
OF	6	Nama Xaba	(substituted off) 61'
RL	5	JD Schickerling
LL	4	Ernst van Rhyn (c)
TP	3	Neethling Fouché	(substituted off) 66'
HK	2	JJ Kotze	(substituted off) 48'
LP	1	Leon Lyons	(substituted off) 65'
Replacements:
HK	16	Andre-Hugo Venter	(substituted on) 48'
PR	17	Dian Bleuler	(substituted on) 65'
PR	18	Lee-Marvin Mazibuko	(substituted on) 66'
LK	19	Justin Basson	(substituted on) 65'
FL	20	Marcel Theunissen	(substituted on) 61'
SH	21	Thomas Bursey	(substituted on) 61'
FH	22	Abner van Reenen	(substituted on) 48'
CE	23	Cornel Smit	(substituted on) 65'
FL	24	Niel Otto
Coach:
(South Africa) John Dobson

FB	15	(Scotland) Stuart Hogg (c)
RW	14	(Wales) Josh Adams	(substituted off) 57'
OC	13	(England) Elliot Daly
IC	12	(Ireland) Robbie Henshaw	(substituted off) 57'
LW	11	(Scotland) Duhan van der Merwe
FH	10	(England) Marcus Smith
SH	9	(Scotland) Ali Price	(substituted off) 57'
N8	8	(Ireland) Jack Conan	(substituted off) 57'
OF	7	(Scotland) Hamish Watson
BF	6	(Ireland) Tadhg Beirne
RL	5	(England) Jonny Hill
LL	4	(Wales) Adam Beard	(substituted off) 53'
TP	3	(Ireland) Tadhg Furlong	(substituted off) 53'
HK	2	(England) Luke Cowan-Dickie	(substituted off) 48'
LP	1	(Scotland) Rory Sutherland	(substituted off) 48'
Replacements:
HK	16	(England) Jamie George	(substituted on) 48'
PR	17	(England) Mako Vunipola	(substituted on) 48'
PR	18	(Scotland) Zander Fagerson	(substituted on) 53'
LK	19	(Wales) Alun Wyn Jones	(substituted on) 53'
N8	20	(England) Sam Simmonds	(substituted on) 57'
SH	21	(Wales) Gareth Davies	(substituted on) 57'
CE	22	(Scotland) Chris Harris	(substituted on) 57'
WG	23	(Wales) Louis Rees-Zammit	(substituted on) 57'
Coach:
(New Zealand) Warren Gatland

Player of the Match:
Luke Cowan-Dickie (British & Irish Lions)

Assistant referees:
Jaco Peyper (South Africa)
AJ Jacobs (South Africa)
Television match official:
Marius van der Westhuizen (South Africa)

Notes:

- Rikus Pretorius and Seabelo Senatla (starting XV) and Kwenzo Blose and Sazi Sandi (replacements) were named in the Stormers team, but were withdrawn ahead of the game, with Leolin Zas and Juan de Jongh being moved to the starting XV. The Stormers bench was reduced from twelve to nine, which included the addition of Dian Bleuler.

=== South Africa v British & Irish Lions (first test) ===
24 July 2021
18:00 SAST (UTC+02)

South Africa	17–22	British & Irish Lions
Try: De Klerk 49' m Pen: Pollard (4/5) 13', 17', 26', 30'	Report	Try: Cowan-Dickie 43' c Con: Biggar (1/1) 44'; Pen: Biggar (4/5) 19', 52', 55', 62'; Farrell (1/1) 78'

Cape Town Stadium, Cape Town
Attendance: 0
Referee: Nic Berry (Australia)

FB	15	Willie le Roux	(substituted off) 66'
RW	14	Cheslin Kolbe
OC	13	Lukhanyo Am
IC	12	Damian de Allende
LW	11	Makazole Mapimpi
FH	10	Handré Pollard	(substituted off) 70'
SH	9	Faf de Klerk	(substituted off) 73'
N8	8	Kwagga Smith	(substituted off) 63'
BF	7	Pieter-Steph du Toit
OF	6	Siya Kolisi (c)
RL	5	Franco Mostert	(substituted off) 62'
LL	4	Eben Etzebeth
TP	3	Trevor Nyakane	(substituted off) 40'
HK	2	Bongi Mbonambi	(substituted off) 40'
LP	1	Ox Nché	(substituted off) 40'
Replacements:
HK	16	Malcolm Marx	(substituted on) 40'
PR	17	Steven Kitshoff	(substituted on) 40'
PR	18	Frans Malherbe	(substituted on) 40'
LK	19	Lood de Jager	(substituted on) 62'
FL	20	Rynhardt Elstadt	(substituted on) 63'
SH	21	Herschel Jantjies	(substituted on) 73'
FH	22	Elton Jantjies	(substituted on) 70'
FB	23	Damian Willemse	(substituted on) 66'
Coach:
(South Africa) Jacques Nienaber

FB	15	(Scotland) Stuart Hogg
RW	14	(England) Anthony Watson
OC	13	(England) Elliot Daly	(substituted off) 64'	(substituted on) 66'
IC	12	(Ireland) Robbie Henshaw
LW	11	(Scotland) Duhan van der Merwe	(substituted off) 70'
FH	10	(Wales) Dan Biggar		(substituted off) 66'
SH	9	(Scotland) Ali Price	(substituted off) 63'
N8	8	(Ireland) Jack Conan
OF	7	(England) Tom Curry	(substituted off) 56'
BF	6	(England) Courtney Lawes	(substituted off) 72'
RL	5	(Wales) Alun Wyn Jones (c)
LL	4	(England) Maro Itoje
TP	3	(Ireland) Tadhg Furlong	(substituted off) 66'
HK	2	(England) Luke Cowan-Dickie	(substituted off) 56'
LP	1	(Scotland) Rory Sutherland	(substituted off) 56'
Replacements:
HK	16	(Wales) Ken Owens	(substituted on) 56'
PR	17	(England) Mako Vunipola	(substituted on) 56'
PR	18	(England) Kyle Sinckler	(substituted on) 66'
LK	19	(Ireland) Tadhg Beirne	(substituted on) 72'
FL	20	(Scotland) Hamish Watson	(substituted on) 56'
SH	21	(Ireland) Conor Murray	(substituted on) 63'
FH	22	(England) Owen Farrell	(substituted on) 64'
FB	23	(Wales) Liam Williams	(substituted on) 70'
Coach:
(New Zealand) Warren Gatland

Player of the Match:
Maro Itoje (British & Irish Lions)

Assistant referees:
Ben O'Keeffe (New Zealand)
Mathieu Raynal (France)
Television match official:
Marius Jonker (South Africa) (Note: Replaced New Zealand's Brendon Pickerill for the full test series after Pickerill was unable to travel due to COVID restrictions.)

Notes:

- Wyn Jones (British & Irish Lions) was originally named in the starting XV, but withdrew ahead of the game due to injury. He was replaced by Rory Sutherland, who was replaced by Mako Vunipola on the bench.
- Tadhg Beirne, Dan Biggar, Tom Curry, Jack Conan, Luke Cowan-Dickie, Robbie Henshaw, Stuart Hogg, Ali Price, Rory Sutherland, Duhan van der Merwe and Hamish Watson all made their Lions test debuts.
- Handré Pollard (South Africa) earned his 50th test cap.
- With Stuart Hogg, Duhan van der Merwe, Ali Price and Rory Sutherland in the starting line-up, this match represented the first time since 2005 that any Scottish player started a British & Irish Lions test match, and the most Scottish players named in starting line-up since 1989.

=== South Africa v British & Irish Lions (second test) ===
31 July 2021
18:00 SAST (UTC+02)

South Africa	27–9	British & Irish Lions
Try: Mapimpi 44' m Am 60' c Con: Pollard (1/2) 61'; Pen: Pollard (5/6) 3', 31', 70', 75', 80'	Report	Pen: Biggar (3/4) 9', 16', 36'

Cape Town Stadium, Cape Town
Attendance: 0
Referee: Ben O'Keeffe (New Zealand)

FB	15	Willie le Roux
RW	14	Cheslin Kolbe	(yellow card) 24' to 34'
OC	13	Lukhanyo Am
IC	12	Damian de Allende
LW	11	Makazole Mapimpi		(substituted off) 67'
FH	10	Handré Pollard
SH	9	Faf de Klerk		(substituted off) 63'
N8	8	Jasper Wiese		(substituted off) 55'
BF	7	Pieter-Steph du Toit		(substituted off) 21'
OF	6	Siya Kolisi (c)		(substituted off) 72'
RL	5	Franco Mostert
LL	4	Eben Etzebeth
TP	3	Frans Malherbe		(substituted off) 55'
HK	2	Bongi Mbonambi		(substituted off) 55'
LP	1	Steven Kitshoff		(substituted off) 59'
Replacements:
HK	16	Malcolm Marx		(substituted on) 55'
PR	17	Trevor Nyakane		(substituted on) 59'
PR	18	Vincent Koch		(substituted on) 55'
LK	19	Lood de Jager		(substituted on) 55'
FL	20	Marco van Staden		(substituted on) 72'
FL	21	Kwagga Smith		(substituted on) 21'
SH	22	Herschel Jantjies		(substituted on) 63'
FB	23	Damian Willemse		(substituted on) 67'
Coach:
(South Africa) Jacques Nienaber

FB	15	(Scotland) Stuart Hogg
RW	14	(England) Anthony Watson
OC	13	(Scotland) Chris Harris		(substituted off) 61'
IC	12	(Ireland) Robbie Henshaw
LW	11	(Scotland) Duhan van der Merwe	(yellow card) 22' to 32'
FH	10	(Wales) Dan Biggar		(substituted off) 57'
SH	9	(Ireland) Conor Murray		(substituted off) 57'
N8	8	(Ireland) Jack Conan		(substituted off) 59'
OF	7	(England) Tom Curry
BF	6	(England) Courtney Lawes		(substituted off) 70'
RL	5	(Wales) Alun Wyn Jones (c)
LL	4	(England) Maro Itoje
TP	3	(Ireland) Tadhg Furlong		(substituted off) 55'
HK	2	(England) Luke Cowan-Dickie		(substituted off) 55'
LP	1	(England) Mako Vunipola		(substituted off) 55'
Replacements:
HK	16	(Wales) Ken Owens		(substituted on) 55'
PR	17	(Scotland) Rory Sutherland		(substituted on) 55'
PR	18	(England) Kyle Sinckler		(substituted on) 55'
LK	19	(Ireland) Tadhg Beirne		(substituted on) 70'
N8	20	(Wales) Taulupe Faletau		(substituted on) 59'
SH	21	(Scotland) Ali Price		(substituted on) 57'
FH	22	(England) Owen Farrell		(substituted on) 57'
CE	23	(England) Elliot Daly		(substituted on) 61'
Coach:
(New Zealand) Warren Gatland

Player of the Match:
Makazole Mapimpi (South Africa)

Assistant referees:
Nic Berry (Australia)
Mathieu Raynal (France)
Television match official:
Marius Jonker (South Africa)

Notes:

- Steven Kitshoff (South Africa) earned his 50th test cap.
- Chris Harris made his Lions test debut.

=== South Africa v British & Irish Lions (third test) ===
7 August 2021
18:00 SAST (UTC+02)

South Africa	19–16	British & Irish Lions
Try: Kolbe 55' c Con: Pollard (1/1) 56'; Pen: Pollard (2/4) 11', 35'; Steyn (2/2) 66', 78'	Report	Try: Owens 18' c Con: Russell (1/1) 20'; Pen: Russell (3/3) 16', 62', 74'

Cape Town Stadium, Cape Town
Attendance: 0
Referee: Mathieu Raynal (France)

FB	15	Willie le Roux	(substituted off) 68'
RW	14	Cheslin Kolbe
OC	13	Lukhanyo Am
IC	12	Damian de Allende
LW	11	Makazole Mapimpi
FH	10	Handré Pollard	(substituted off) 64'
SH	9	Cobus Reinach	(substituted off) 63'
N8	8	Jasper Wiese		(substituted off) 62'
BF	7	Franco Mostert	12' to 20'
OF	6	Siya Kolisi (c)	(substituted off) 55'	(substituted on) 62'
RL	5	Lood de Jager			(substituted off) 52'
LL	4	Eben Etzebeth
TP	3	Frans Malherbe	(substituted off) 55'
HK	2	Bongi Mbonambi	(substituted off) 55'
LP	1	Steven Kitshoff	(substituted off) 60'
Replacements:
HK	16	Malcolm Marx	(substituted on) 55'
PR	17	Trevor Nyakane	(substituted on) 60'
PR	18	Vincent Koch	(substituted on) 55'
FL	19	Marco van Staden	(substituted on) 55'
FL	20	Kwagga Smith	(substituted on) 12'	(substituted off) 20'	(substituted on) 52'
SH	21	Herschel Jantjies	(substituted on) 63'
FH	22	Morné Steyn	(substituted on) 64'
FB	23	Damian Willemse	(substituted on) 68'
Coach:
(South Africa) Jacques Nienaber

FB	15	(Wales) Liam Williams
RW	14	(Wales) Josh Adams
OC	13	(Ireland) Robbie Henshaw
IC	12	(Ireland) Bundee Aki
LW	11	(Scotland) Duhan van der Merwe
FH	10	(Wales) Dan Biggar	(substituted off) 10'
SH	9	(Scotland) Ali Price	(substituted off) 58'
N8	8	(Ireland) Jack Conan	(substituted off) 60'
OF	7	(England) Tom Curry
BF	6	(England) Courtney Lawes
RL	5	(Wales) Alun Wyn Jones (c)	(substituted off) 60'
LL	4	(England) Maro Itoje
TP	3	(Ireland) Tadhg Furlong	(substituted off) 58'
HK	2	(Wales) Ken Owens	(substituted off) 53'
LP	1	(Wales) Wyn Jones	(substituted off) 43'
Replacements:
HK	16	(England) Luke Cowan-Dickie	(substituted on) 53'
PR	17	(England) Mako Vunipola	(substituted on) 43'
PR	18	(England) Kyle Sinckler	(substituted on) 58'
LK	19	(Wales) Adam Beard	(substituted on) 60'
N8	20	(England) Sam Simmonds	(substituted on) 60'
SH	21	(Ireland) Conor Murray	(substituted on) 58'
FH	22	(Scotland) Finn Russell	(substituted on) 10'
CE	23	(England) Elliot Daly
Coach:
(New Zealand) Warren Gatland

Player of the Match:
Cheslin Kolbe (South Africa)

Assistant referees:
Ben O'Keeffe (New Zealand)
Nic Berry (Australia)
Television match official:
Marius Jonker (South Africa)

Notes:

- Damian de Allende (South Africa) earned his 50th test cap.
- Josh Adams, Bundee Aki, Adam Beard, Wyn Jones, Finn Russell and Sam Simmonds all made their Lions test debuts.
- South Africa won the inaugural Lions Series Trophy.
