= Ali Price =

Scottish rugby union player (born 1993)

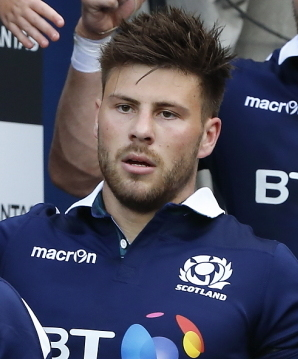
- Price representing Scotland during the Summer Internationals
- Full name: Alistair William Price
- Born: 12 May 1993 (age 33) King's Lynn, England
- Height: 1.78 m (5 ft 10 in)
- Weight: 88 kg (194 lb; 13 st 12 lb)
- School: Wisbech Grammar School

Rugby union career
- Position: Scrum-half
- Current team: Montpellier
Senior career
Years	Team	Apps	(Points)
2011–2013	Bedford Blues	5	(0)
2013	Saracens	1	(0)
2014–2023	Glasgow Warriors	130	(95)
2023–2025	Edinburgh	11	(5)
2025-	Montpellier	27	(20)
- Correct as of 8 September 2025
International career
Years	Team	Apps	(Points)
2013	Scotland U20	5	(0)
2016–	Scotland	68	(30)
2021	British & Irish Lions	3	(0)
2022	Scotland 'A'	1	(5)
- Correct as of 16 March 2024

Alistair William Price (born 12 May 1993) is a professional rugby union player who plays as a scrum-half for Top 14 club Montpellier. Born in England, he represents Scotland at international level after qualifying on ancestry grounds.

== Early life ==
Price was born on 12 May 1993 in King's Lynn, Norfolk, England. He was educated at Wisbech Grammar School, a private school in Wisbech, Cambridgeshire. He is eligible to play for Scotland through his Scottish mother. He has extended family in Troon, South Ayrshire.

Price was drafted to Ayr in the Scottish Premiership for the 2017–18 season.

== Club career ==
Price signed for Glasgow Warriors in the 2013–14 season as part of their Elite Development Programme. As part of this deal, Price also played for the BT Premiership side Stirling County. In November 2023 Price was loaned to Edinburgh, where he stayed until the end of the 2024–25 season, signing for Montpellier from the 2025–26 season.

On 21 December 2015 Price graduated from the Scottish Rugby Academy and signed a professional contract with Glasgow Warriors.

Price's nickname amongst his teammates at Glasgow is "Ah-ha-li Price" in reference to another famous Norfolk resident, Alan Partridge.

== International career ==
=== Scotland ===
On 26 November 2016, Price made his Scotland debut against Georgia in a 43 points to 16 win at Rugby Park, Kilmarnock.

Price was selected in Scotland's 2019 Rugby World Cup squad and played in Scotland's opening Pool A match against Ireland. However, he sustained a foot injury and that curtailed his World Cup experience.

Price was capped by Scotland 'A' on 25 June 2022 in their match against Chile.

In 2023 Price was selected in Scotland's 33 player squad for the 2023 Rugby World Cup in France.

=== British & Irish Lions ===
In May 2021, Price was selected in the 37-man squad for the British and Irish Lions tour of South Africa. He became Lion #843 after taking to the field in the opening warmup match against Japan at Murrayfield.

Price scored a try on his first Lions start against the Sigma Lions at Ellis Park Stadium in Johannesburg.

After performing strongly in the tour's warm-up matches, and despite Conor Murray having previously been named tour captain, Price was selected in the starting line up for the first Test, playing for 65 minutes as the Lions won 22–17 to take a lead in the series. He then came off the bench for another cap in the second Test defeat, before being restored to the starting line-up for the third and decisive Test.

== Career statistics ==
=== List of international tries ===
No.	Date	Venue	Opponent	Score	Result	Competition
1	10 June 2017	National Stadium, Kallang, Singapore	Italy	8–3	34–13	2017 June rugby union tests
2	25 November 2017	Murrayfield Stadium, Edinburgh, Scotland	Australia	15–12	53–24	2017 end-of-year rugby union internationals
3	23 February 2019	Stade de France, Paris, France	France	8–20	10–27	2019 Six Nations Championship
4	6 September 2019	Murrayfield Stadium, Edinburgh, Scotland	Georgia	5–0	36–9	2019 Rugby World Cup warm-up matches
5	30 September 2023	Stade Pierre-Mauroy, Lille, France	Romania	12–0	84–0	2023 Rugby World Cup
6	7 October 2023	Stade de France, Paris, France	Ireland	12–36	14–36	2023 Rugby World Cup

as of 7 October 2023
