= Duhan van der Merwe =

British Lions & Scotland international rugby union player (born 1995)

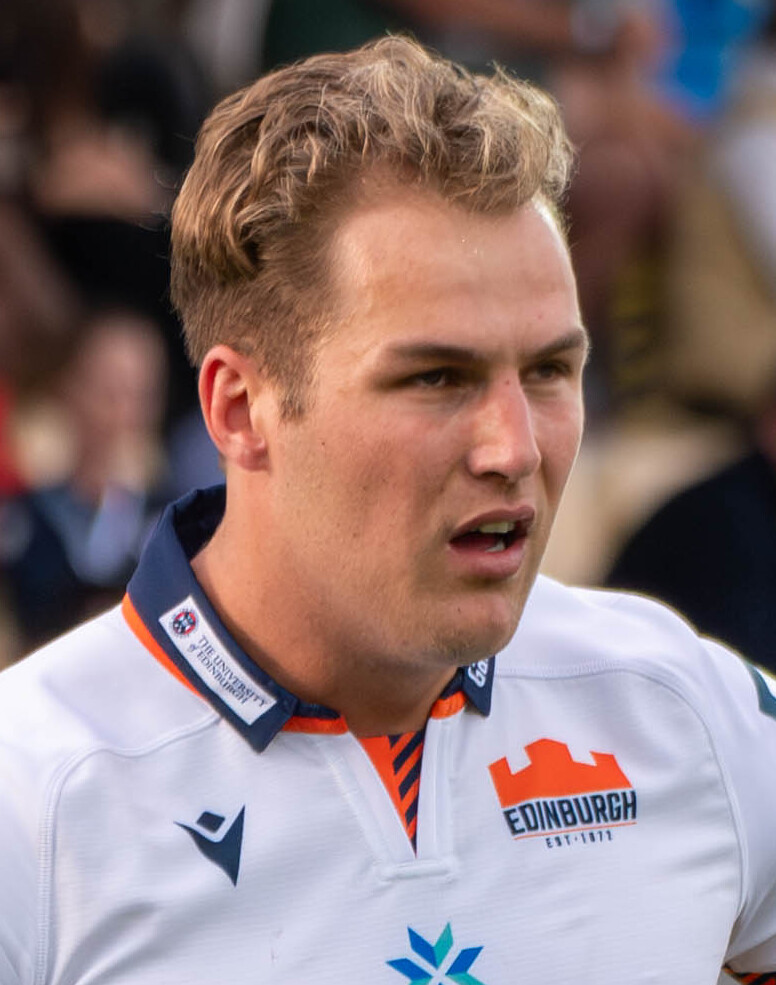
- van der Merwe representing Edinburgh during the 2025–26 United Rugby Championship
- Born: 4 June 1995 (age 31) George, Western Cape, South Africa
- Height: 1.94 m (6 ft 4 in)
- Weight: 106 kg (234 lb; 16 st 10 lb)
- School: Hoërskool Outeniqua
- University: University of Pretoria
- Notable relative: Akker van der Merwe (brother)

Rugby union career
- Position: Wing
- Current team: Edinburgh
Senior career
Years	Team	Apps	(Points)
2016	Blue Bulls	2	(0)
2016–2017	Montpellier	4	(15)
2017–2021	Edinburgh	67	(200)
2021–2022	Worcester Warriors	17	(40)
2022–	Edinburgh	45	(90)
- Correct as of 11 March 2026
International career
Years	Team	Apps	(Points)
2014	South Africa U20	2	(0)
2020–	Scotland	54	(175)
2021, 2025	British & Irish Lions	3	(5)
- Correct as of 18 November 2026

Duhan van der Merwe (born 4 June 1995) is a professional rugby union player who plays as a wing for Edinburgh in the United Rugby Championship (URC) and the Scotland national team. Born in South Africa, he represents Scotland having qualified on residency grounds.

Van der Merwe's rugby career began in George, South Africa, playing for Outeniqua High School before gaining provincial recognition in youth tournaments. He impressed at the Craven Week, earning a spot on the South Africa Schools team and excelling in the Under-18 International Series.He made it on to the SA under18 ruby team and had a great season.

Transitioning to the professional level, he joined the Blue Bulls' academy in 2014 and made his mark with the South Africa under-20 squad at the World Rugby U20 Championship. He continued to shine domestically with the Blue Bulls and UP Tuks, leading as a top scorer in the Varsity Cup. His international career began when he became eligible for Scotland in 2020, and he has since represented the nation in the Six Nations Championship and the Rugby World Cup, becoming their all-time top try scorer in 2024.

== Early life ==
Duhan was born to Dulene (mother) and Alhan (father) van der Merwe, in George, a coastal town in the Western Cape province of South Africa. He attended and played rugby for Outeniqa High School (Hoërskool Outeniqua), earning several provincial colours by representing the SWD Eagles at youth tournaments. In 2011, he represented SWD [South Western Districts] at the Under-16 Grant Khomo Week held in Queenstown, appearing in all three matches and scoring a try in their 25–8 victory over KwaZulu-Natal.

The following year, he played for SWD at the premier schoolboy rugby tournament in South Africa, the Under-18 Craven Week. He scored four tries – two against the Limpopo Blue Bulls and two against Western Province – at the tournament held in Port Elizabeth. He was named in the South Africa Schools team at the conclusion of the tournament, and made two starts for them in the Under-18 International Series, helping them to victories over France and England.

Still eligible for the Under-18s in 2013, van der Merwe again played in all three of SWD's matches at the Craven Week held in Polokwane. He scored three tries – two against Eastern Province and one in a victory over the Blue Bulls – and was again included in the South African Schools team. He scored a try in their 19–14 victory over England in their first match of the 2013 Under-18 International Series, and followed that up with two tries in their next match against France. He didn't score in their final match against Wales, but still finished as the top try scorer in the competition.

He also played rugby sevens, where he represented South Africa.

== Club career ==
=== Youth ===
After high school, van der Merwe moved to Pretoria, where he joined the Blue Bulls' academy for the 2014 season.

He returned to domestic action to play for the Blue Bulls U19 team in the 2014 Under-19 Provincial Championship. He made twelve starts in the competition and scored a total of eight tries, the second-highest by a Blue Bulls player and joint-third overall in Group A of the competition. After scoring a single try in matches against Sharks U19 and Western Province U19, he scored two tries against the Leopards U19 in a 52–27 win. Another try in their second meeting against Western Province was followed by a hat-trick in a 46–24 victory over the Leopards in Potchefstroom. The helped his side finish top of the log and make it all the way to the final of the competition before losing to Western Province. In addition to his appearance for the Under-19 team, he also played one match for the Blue Bulls U21 side, in a 24–10 victory over Free State U21.

He had an operation at the start of 2015, which ruled him out of action for the majority of the season, also ruling him out of contention with a second consecutive Under 20 Championship. He returned to action for the Blue Bulls U21s, making six starts in the Under-21 Provincial Championship, scoring one try in their 43–10 victory over Eastern Province U21.

At the start of 2016, he played Varsity Cup rugby with UP Tuks, starting all eight of their matches. He scored tries in defeats to NWU Pukke and UFS Shimlas and scored two tries in their 68–25 victory over CUT Ixias. In their final match of the regular season against bottom team UCT Ikey Tigers, Van der Merwe scored six of his side's eleven tries in a 100–25 victory. With bonus points in effect for scoring tries that originated outside the final 22, Van der Merwe's point haul in the match was a massive 48 points and he finished the competition as the top try scorer and the fourth-highest points scorer.

After the Varsity Cup, van der Merwe made his domestic first class debut for the Blue Bulls in the 2016 Currie Cup qualification series. He made an appearance as a replacement in a 14–19 defeat to the Eastern Province Kings, and made his first start a week later against the Pumas, which would be his final action in a Blue Bulls shirt.

=== Montpellier ===
He moved to France in July 2016 to join Top 14 side Montpellier, signing a youth contract with the team. He made his debut for the senior team in their Round 15 match against Pau, replacing Joffrey Michel. A recurring hip injury, and difficulties adjusting to the culture and language, meant he gained little game time.

=== Edinburgh ===
Van der Merwe signed a two-year professional contract with Scottish Pro14 side Edinburgh ahead of the 2017–18 season. He failed his medical due to a long-standing hip injury, but Edinburgh head coach Richard Cockerill signed him despite this. The injury meant he missed half of his first season. However, his impact afterwards was strong. One area of improvement was seeking to get more involved in the game, from his wing position.

=== Worcester Warriors ===
On 4 January 2021, it was announced that Van der Merwe would move to England to sign for Worcester Warriors ahead of the 2021–22 Premiership Rugby season on a long-term deal. Due to the club entering administration all Warriors players had their contracts terminated on 5 October 2022.

Only hours after having his contract terminated at Worcester Warriors it was confirmed that Van der Merwe would return to Edinburgh on a long-term deal.

He returned to Edinburgh at the end of 2022 following the termination of his contract with Worcester Warriors.

=== Return to Edinburgh ===
In December 2024, he signed a two-year contract extension with Edinburgh Rugby, committing to remain with the team until at least the 2027 Rugby World Cup.

== International career ==
=== South Africa U20 ===
Van der Merwe was a late call-up to the South Africa Under-20 squad that participated at the 2014 IRB Junior World Championship in New Zealand, replacing Rohan Janse van Rensburg who picked up an injury in South Africa's 61–5 victory against Scotland in the opening round in Pool C. Van der Merwe was an unused replacement for their 33–24 victory over hosts New Zealand in their second match, but started their final pool match, a 21–8 victory over Samoa to help the team finish top of their pool to progress to the semi-finals. He didn't feature in their 32–25 win over New Zealand at that stage, but was named on the bench for the final against England and came on as a replacement in the second half, with South Africa losing 20–21 to finish as runners-up in the competition.

=== Scotland ===
Van der Merwe became available for the Scottish international rugby team in Summer 2020. This was based on residency having then lived in Scotland for 3 years since he joined Edinburgh in 2017. He made his international debut for Scotland against Georgia on 23 October 2020, scoring a try in the process. He doubled his test try-scoring tally on 14 November, touching down one of Scotland's four tries in Florence during victory over Italy. then adding another in Dublin on 5 December.

Van der Merwe scored the decisive try in Scotland's victory over England in the opening match of the 2021 Six Nations Championship. The following month he scored a further two tries against Italy in a 52–10 victory. This was followed by another brace in the final match of the championship in Paris, the second coming in 84th minute of play to secure a dramatic last-gasp win, Scotland's first in France since 1999. During this campaign, he became the first player in Scotland history to end a Six Nations tournament as the outright top scorer, excluding joint top scorers. This brought his tally to eight tries in his first ten test matches.

Van der Merwe was selected in Scotland's 33-player squad for the 2023 Rugby World Cup in France; however, they exited the tournament in the pool stage, failing to beat both Ireland and South Africa.

Van der Merwe was then selected for the 2024 Six Nations Championship. He scored his first Scotland hat-trick against England, after scoring two in the opener against Wales.

Van der Merwe was selected for the Scotland team's Skyscanner Americas Tour in the summer of 2024, his two tries on that tour against USA and Uruguay, saw him overtake Stuart Hogg as the scorer of the most international tries for Scotland.

In February 2025, during the 2025 Six Nations, despite losing the fixture 16–15 he scored a try and won his third consecutive man of the match in the Calcutta Cup against England. In November 2025, he once again overtook Darcy Graham to become the all-time leading tryscorer for Scotland on 35 after a 56–0 win against Tonga in the 2025 Autumn Nations Series.

=== British & Irish Lions ===
In May 2021, Van der Merwe was selected in the 37-man squad for the British & Irish Lions tour to South Africa.

He took to the field in the opening warm-up match against Japan at Murrayfield, scoring a try in the process and becoming Lion #841. After performing well in the tour's warm up games, scoring five tries in four appearances, he was selected in the starting line up for the first Test and played 70 minutes as the Lions won 17–22. He subsequently played the full 80 minutes of both the second and third Tests as well.

In May 2025, van Der Merwe was again selected, this time by Head Coach Andy Farrell for the 2025 British & Irish Lions tour to Australia.

== Personal life ==
Van der Merwe and his wife Nika married in 2023.

Van der Merwe has an older brother, Akker van der Merwe, who is also a professional rugby union player. Akker plays hooker for the Blue Bulls.

== Career statistics ==
=== List of international tries ===
No.	Date	Venue	Opponent	Score	Result	Competition
1	23 October 2020	Murrayfield Stadium, Edinburgh, Scotland	Georgia	39–7	48–7	2020 end-of-year rugby union internationals
2	14 November 2020	Stadio Artemio Franchi, Florence, Italy	Italy	5–6	28–17	Autumn Nations Cup
3	5 December 2020	Aviva Stadium, Dublin, Ireland	Ireland	14–18	16–31	Autumn Nations Cup
4	6 February 2021	Twickenham Stadium, London, England	England	8–3	11–6	2021 Six Nations Championship
5	20 March 2021	Murrayfield Stadium, Edinburgh, Scotland	Italy	10–7	52–10	2021 Six Nations Championship
6	20 March 2021	Murrayfield Stadium, Edinburgh, Scotland	Italy	50–10	52–10	2021 Six Nations Championship
7	26 March 2021	Stade de France, Paris, France	France	5–3	27–23	2021 Six Nations Championship
8	26 March 2021	Stade de France, Paris, France	France	25–23	27–23	2021 Six Nations Championship
9	26 June 2021	Murrayfield Stadium, Edinburgh, Scotland	Japan	12–0	28–10	2021 British & Irish Lions tour to South Africa
10	20 November 2021	Murrayfield Stadium, Edinburgh, Scotland	Japan	5–0	29–20	2021 end-of-year rugby union internationals
11	26 February 2022	Murrayfield Stadium, Edinburgh, Scotland	France	15–36	17–36	2022 Six Nations Championship
12	16 July 2022	Estadio Único Madre de Ciudades, Santiago del Estero, Argentina	Argentina	5–3	31–34	2022 mid-year rugby union tests
13	16 July 2022	Estadio Único Madre de Ciudades, Santiago del Estero, Argentina	Argentina	26–13	31–34	2022 mid-year rugby union tests
14	5 November 2022	Murrayfield Stadium, Edinburgh, Scotland	Fiji	19–12	28–12	2022 end-of-year rugby union internationals
15	19 November 2022	Murrayfield Stadium, Edinburgh, Scotland	Argentina	12–7	52–29	2022 end-of-year rugby union internationals
16	4 February 2023	Twickenham Stadium, London, England	England	12–5	29–23	2023 Six Nations Championship
17	4 February 2023	Twickenham Stadium, London, England	England	27–23	29–23	2023 Six Nations Championship
18	18 March 2023	Murrayfield Stadium, Edinburgh, Scotland	Italy	5–3	26–14	2023 Six Nations Championship
19	12 August 2023	Stade Geoffroy Guichard, Saint-Étienne, France	France	15–27	27–30	2023 Rugby World Cup warm-up matches
20	26 August 2023	Murrayfield Stadium, Edinburgh, Scotland	Georgia	5–6	33–6	2023 Rugby World Cup warm-up matches
21	26 August 2023	Murrayfield Stadium, Edinburgh, Scotland	Georgia	33–6	33–6	2023 Rugby World Cup warm-up matches
22	24 September 2023	Stade de Nice, Nice, France	Tonga	12–10	45–17	2023 Rugby World Cup
23	3 February 2024	Millennium Stadium, Cardiff, Wales	Wales	18–0	27–26	2024 Six Nations Championship
24	3 February 2024	Millennium Stadium, Cardiff, Wales	Wales	25–0	27–26	2024 Six Nations Championship
25	24 February 2024	Murrayfield Stadium, Edinburgh, Scotland	England	5–10	30–21	2024 Six Nations Championship
26	24 February 2024	Murrayfield Stadium, Edinburgh, Scotland	England	12–10	30–21	2024 Six Nations Championship
27	24 February 2024	Murrayfield Stadium, Edinburgh, Scotland	England	22–13	30–21	2024 Six Nations Championship
28	12 July 2024	Audi Field, Washington DC, United States	United States	5–0	42–7	2024 mid-year rugby union tests
29	27 July 2024	Estadio Charrúa, Montevideo, Uruguay	Uruguay	19-0	31–19	2024 mid-year rugby union tests
30	2 November 2024	Murrayfield Stadium, Edinburgh, Scotland	Fiji	48-17	57–17	2024 end-of-year rugby union internationals
31	24 November 2024	Murrayfield Stadium, Edinburgh, Scotland	Australia	17-6	27–13	2024 end-of-year rugby union internationals
32	9 February 2025	Murrayfield Stadium, Edinburgh, Scotland	Ireland	5-17	18–32	2025 Six Nations Championship
33	22 February 2025	Twickenham Stadium, London, England	England	7-10	16–15	2025 Six Nations Championship
34	1 November 2025	Murrayfield Stadium, Edinburgh, Scotland	United States	12-0	85-0	2025 end-of-year rugby union internationals
35	1 November 2025	Murrayfield Stadium, Edinburgh, Scotland	United States	33-0	85-0	2025 end-of-year rugby union internationals

as of 11 March 2026
