= Adam Beard =

Welsh rugby union player

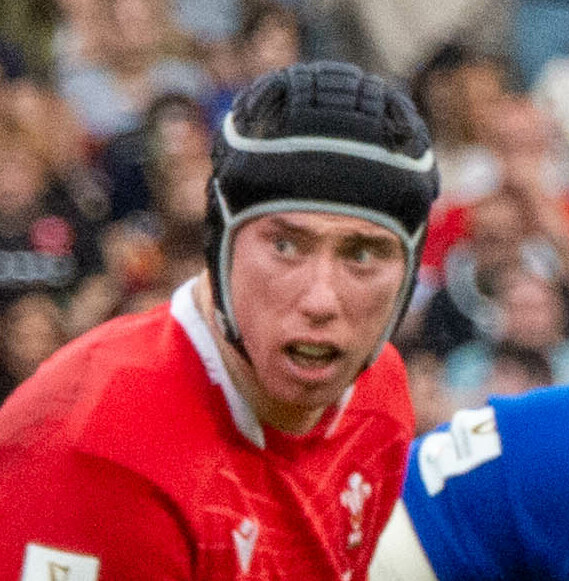
- Beard representing Wales during the Six Nations Championship
- Full name: Adam James Beard
- Born: 7 January 1996 (age 30) Swansea, Wales
- Height: 2.03 m (6 ft 8 in)
- Weight: 126 kg (278 lb; 19 st 12 lb)
- School: Neath Port Talbot College

Rugby union career
- Position: Lock
- Current team: Montpellier
Senior career
Years	Team	Apps	(Points)
2014–2025	Ospreys	135	(10)
2025–	Montpellier	23	(5)
- Correct as of 13 August 2026
International career
Years	Team	Apps	(Points)
2015–2016	Wales U20s	15	(10)
2017–	Wales	70	(0)
2021	British & Irish Lions	1	(0)
- Correct as of 13 August 2026

Adam James Beard (born 7 January 1996) is a Welsh professional rugby union player who plays as a lock for Montpellier and the Wales national team.

== Club career ==
Beard made his debut for the Ospreys in 2012 having previously played for their academy team, Aberavon RFC and Birchgrove RFC.

On 2 July 2025, after 11 years playing for Ospreys, Beard would leave the Welsh region to sign for French team Montpellier on a three-year deal in the Top 14 from the 2025-26 season. As part of Montpellier, Beard won the 2025-26 EPCR Challenge Cup.

== International career ==
=== Wales ===
In May 2017 Beard was named in the Wales senior squad for the tests against Tonga and Samoa in June 2017 He made his debut for Wales against Samoa in Apia on the 2017 summer tour, coming on as a replacement, and then made his first start in the home victory over Georgia five months later. His 6 Nations debut came in the win over France in Paris in 2019 – his ninth straight win in a Wales shirt. He went on to start in four of the Grand Slam matches in the 2019 championships, and came on as a replacement in the other, as he extended his unbeaten run in a Welsh shirt to 11 matches up to 1 August 2019.

Beard was named in the squad for the 2026 Six Nations by Steve Tandy.

=== British and Irish Lions ===
Beard was called into the British & Irish Lions squad for the 2021 tour to South Africa. This followed the temporary withdrawal of tour captain Alun Wyn Jones following a shoulder injury. On 7 July Beard made his Lions debut in the Provincial game against the Sharks. Beard would go on to make his Lions test debut in the third test against the Springboks.

== Personal life ==
Beard is married to Chelsea Beard, the Wales netball international.

== Honours ==
=== Montpellier ===
- EPCR Challenge Cup: 2026

=== Wales ===
- Six Nations Championship: 2019, 2021
- Grand Slam: 2019
- Triple Crown: 2019, 2021
- Doddie Weir Cup: 2019, 2021, 2022
