= Chris Harris (rugby union) =

British Lions & Scotland international rugby union player

- Born: Christopher James Harris; 28 December 1990 (age 35) Carlisle, England
- Height: 1.88 m (6 ft 2 in)
- Weight: 104 kg (16 st 5 lb; 229 lb)
- University: Northumbria University

Rugby union career
- Position: Centre
Amateur team(s)
Years	Team	Apps	(Points)
2009–2014	Tynedale	47	(118)
Senior career
Years	Team	Apps	(Points)
2014−2019	Newcastle Falcons	101	(85)
2014−2015	→ Rotherham Titans	6	(0)
2019–2025	Gloucester	110	(135)
2025–2026	Bath	14	(0)
2026-	Newcastle Red Bulls		
- Correct as of 1 May 2026
International career
Years	Team	Apps	(Points)
2013	England Counties	2	(15)
2017–2023	Scotland	46	(30)
2021	British & Irish Lions	1	(0)
- Correct as of 30 September 2023

Christopher James Harris (born 28 December 1990) is a rugby union player who plays centre for Bath in Premiership Rugby and for Scotland.

== Early life and education ==
Harris was born in Cumbria, England, and attended Trinity School, Carlisle. He played rugby whilst young at Carlisle rugby club. He married long time girlfriend Ruby Wilkinson on 13 August 2022.

He studied at Northumbria University, gaining a 2:1 BSc in Architectural Technology in 2013.

== Rugby playing career ==
=== Club ===
Harris was dual registered with Tynedale RFC in National League 1 and also had a loan spell with Rotherham Titans in the Championship.

In October 2014 Harris made his professional debut for the Newcastle Falcons, scoring a try against București Wolves in the European Challenge Cup. In December 2014, Harris scored two tries on his Premiership debut against Saracens.

With the Falcons being relegated, Harris joined Gloucester for the start of the 2019–20 season

On 29 May 2025, it was announced that Harris was joining local rivals Bath for the 2025-26 Premiership season, on a one year deal. He made his debut for bath on 6 September 2025 in a pre-season friendly match against Glasgow Warriors.

=== International ===
In June 2013, Harris scored a try for England Counties XV against Belgium.

In October 2017, Harris received his first call up to the senior Scotland squad by coach Gregor Townsend for the Autumn Internationals. Harris is Scottish qualified through his Edinburgh born grandmother. On 11 November 2017, Harris made his test debut at Murrayfield against Samoa. Harris started in the first Six Nations game against Wales in 2018. He scored his first try for Scotland in a game vs Italy 2019 Six Nations, scoring just minutes after making an appearance off the bench and scored the winning try for Scotland against France at Murrayfield. He appeared for Scotland in the 2019 Rugby World Cup fixtures and continued his form to play in every match for 2020 Six Nations.

Harris played in all five matches of the 2021 Six Nations, including stirring away victories at both Twickenham and in Paris. Gregor Townsend said that Harris was one of Scotland's "defensive leaders."

In 2023 Harris was selected in Scotland's 33 player squad for the 2023 Rugby World Cup in France.

=== British & Irish Lions tour to South Africa, 2021 ===
Harris was selected in the starting line-up for the second Test match.

=== International statistics ===
Appearances and tries by national team and year
National team	Year	Apps	Tries
Scotland	2017	1	0
Scotland	2018	5	0
Scotland	2019	8	2
Scotland	2020	9	1
Scotland	2021	8	0
Scotland	2022	8	2
Scotland	2023	7	1
Total		46	6

Appearances and tries by national team and year
National team	Year	Apps	Tries
British & Irish Lions	2021	1	0
Total		1	0
