= Bundee Aki =

British Lions & Ireland international rugby union player (born 1990)

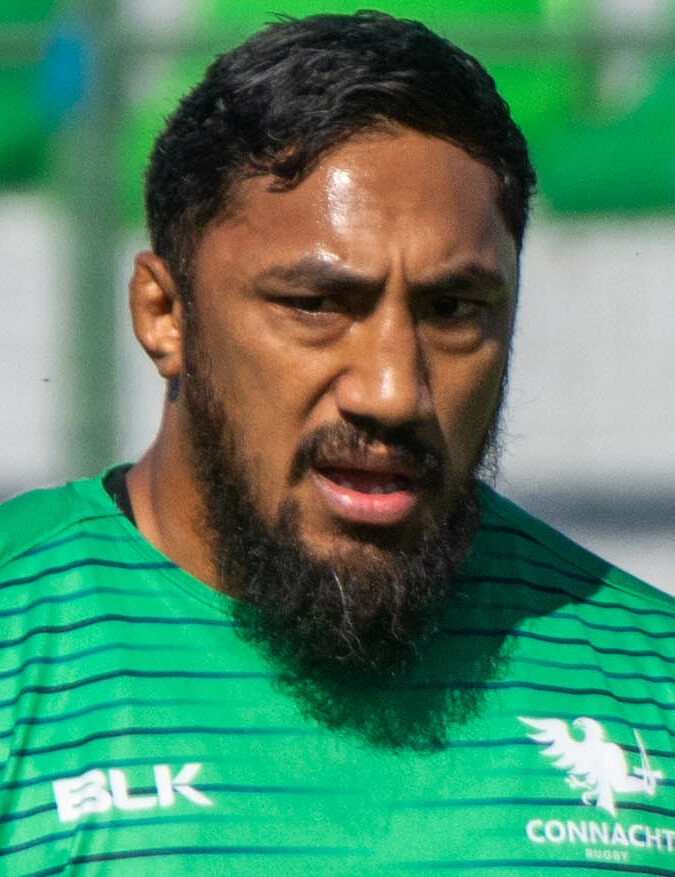
- Aki representing Connacht during the 2022–23 EPCR Challenge Cup
- Full name: Fua Leiofi Bundellu Aki
- Born: 7 April 1990 (age 36) Auckland, New Zealand
- Height: 1.78 m (5 ft 10 in)
- Weight: 102 kg (225 lb; 16 st 1 lb)
- School: Manurewa High School
- University: Athlone Institute of Technology

Rugby union career
- Position: Centre
- Current team: Connacht
Senior career
Years	Team	Apps	(Points)
2011–2014	Counties Manukau	43	(50)
2013–2014	Chiefs	25	(50)
2014–	Connacht	160	(160)
- Correct as of 20 March 2026
International career
Years	Team	Apps	(Points)
2017–	Ireland	72	(95)
2021, 2025	British & Irish Lions	4	(0)
- Correct as of 21 November 2026

Fua Leiofi Bundellu Aki (born 7 April 1990) is a professional rugby union player who plays as a centre for United Rugby Championship club Connacht. Born in New Zealand, he represents Ireland at international level after qualifying on residency grounds. He has four caps for the British and Irish Lions, has won three Six Nations Championships, three Triple Crowns and two Grand Slams with Ireland, a Super Rugby title with the Chiefs and one PRO12 title with Connacht.

== Early life ==
Of Samoan descent, Aki was born in the Auckland suburb of Ōtāhuhu, to Hercules and Sautia Aki. He was named Fua Leiofi, but was called Bundellu after the doctor who delivered him. The nickname "Bundee" was given to him by a rugby coach at under-age level. Bundee is the second eldest of six children, with one brother and four sisters.

Aki grew up in Manurewa, a suburb in South Auckland, and attended Manurewa High School, where he played for the school's First XV rugby team. He took a year out from a professional rugby career in 2011, when he worked as a bank teller.

== Club career ==
=== Malaysia ===
Aki played for the Borneo Eagles based in Sabah, East Malaysia.

=== Counties Manukau ===
Aki began playing for Counties Manukau in the 2011 season. He made nine appearances for the side with five of these coming as starts, scoring three tries as they finished fourth in the Championship Division of the 2011 ITM Cup. In the 2012 ITM Cup, he played 11 of the team's 12 games, starting on each occasion and scoring six tries. Counties Manukau finished top of the Championship Division and won their play-off games against Southland and Otago, which earned the side promotion to the following year's Premiership Division.

With Counties promoted to the Premiership Division, he played in all ten of their regular season games in the 2013 ITM Cup, starting eight of these, as the team qualified for the play-offs on their return to the top flight. He also started in the team's play-off semi-final, a 41–10 defeat to Wellington. Aki scored one try during the course of the season, with the score coming against Tasman in a 20–40 defeat.

2014 was Aki's final season with Counties, as it had been announced earlier in the year that he would be leaving New Zealand to join Irish side Connacht. He started all ten games as Counties finished fifth, two points outside the playoff places, in the 2014 ITM Cup, but did not score any points. Aki's final appearance for Counties Manukau came in the team's 41–18 victory over Auckland on 8 October 2014.

=== Chiefs ===
In September 2012, it was announced that Aki had signed for reigning Super Rugby champions the Chiefs, having been part of the side's development set up previously. Aki came into the team for the 2013 Super Rugby season. He played in 13 of the side's 18 regular season games, starting 12 of these and scoring five tries, as Chiefs finished top of the table. Aki also featured for the team in the play-offs coming off the bench after 48 minutes against Crusaders in the semi-final, and after 46 minutes in the final against the Brumbies as Chiefs won their second title in a row.

Aki played ten times for Chiefs in the regular season of the 2014 season, starting seven of these matches and scoring three tries. Chiefs finished sixth in the final standings of the league season, the final qualifying spot for the competition's play-off rounds. Aki started in the Chiefs' quarter-final game against the Brumbies, a replay of the previous year's final. Aki scored his fourth try of the season, but finished on the losing side as the Brumbies won the game by 32–30. This was Aki's final game for the Chiefs, as it had been announced earlier in the year that he would be moving to Irish side, Connacht.

=== Connacht ===
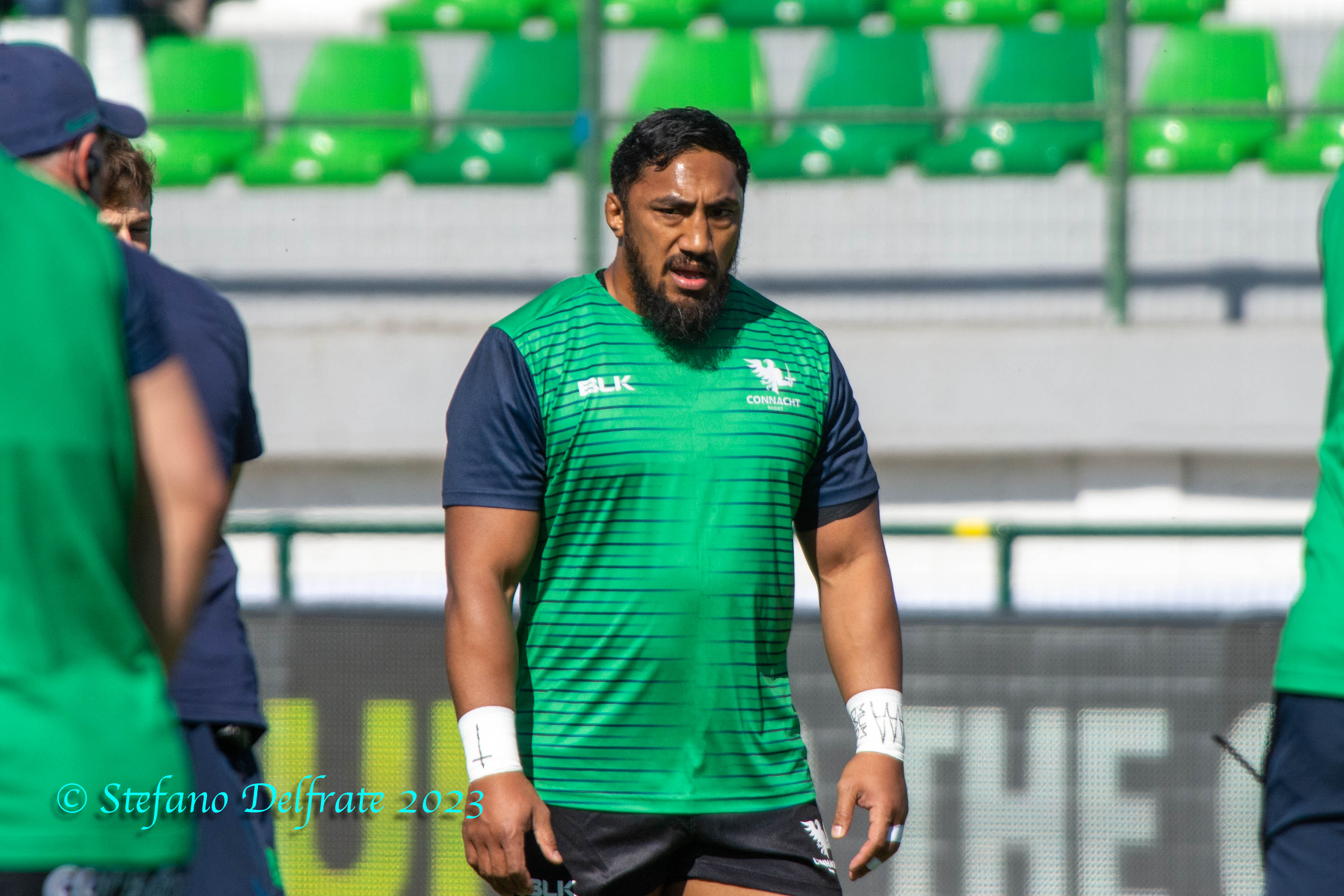
Aki before Connacht's 2022–23 Challenge Cup match against Benetton Rugby

Aki signed for Connacht in April 2014 and moved to Ireland ahead of the 2014–15 season. This move made him the second Chiefs player in as many years to join Connacht, following the transfer of captain Craig Clarke the previous season. He quickly became a key part of Connacht's setup, starting whenever fit and excelling on the pitch.

For his performances with Connacht during the 2015–16 Pro12 season, which saw the club win the Pro12 league for the first time. Aki was awarded the Player of the Year. On 25 October 2016, Aki signed a new contract to remain at Connacht until 2020. He became eligible to play for Ireland after completing three years of residence in the country in October 2017.

In November 2019, he signed a fresh three-year extension to his central contract, to keep him with Connacht until the summer of 2023 at least, the first Connacht player to sign a central deal with the union. After signing, he declared: "I am truly grateful for the opportunity I have been given to represent both Connacht and Irish and am delighted to extend my IRFU contract". His decision to extend his contract came after much media speculation about what his future may hold after a disappointing 2019 Rugby World Cup.

In October 2023, following Ireland's exit from the Rugby World Cup and Aki's nomination for World Player Of The Year, the IRFU announced Aki had extended his central contract, keeping him at Connacht to 2025.

On 17 December 2024, after much speculation over his future, Aki signed a one-year contract extension with Connacht and the IRFU until the end of the 2025–26 season.

== International career ==
=== Ireland call-up ===
Aki was qualified to play for New Zealand, where he was born and raised, and Samoa, the country of origin of his parents. However, after completing a three-year residency period, he became eligible to represent Ireland on the international stage.

On 26 October 2017, Aki was named in the extended Ireland squad for the Autumn internationals. His inclusion came at a time when a growing number of players were qualifying to play for a foreign nation based on the three-year residency rule, which sparked a huge debate about eligibility rules in rugby union.

Parts of the media stated that he had no real connection with Ireland, was getting in the way of Irish talent going through the ranks, and questioned loyalty issues should Aki decide to move abroad after his contract was over thus ending his international career. His selection was criticised by some former internationals, including Neil Francis and Luke Fitzgerald, who was generally critical of the residency rule, but supported by others including Alan Quinlan Simon Easterby, and Chris Farrell. Other rugby figures, including Conor Murray, and former Ireland head coach Eddie O'Sullivan, whilst critical of the residency rule, felt it was unfair individual players such as Aki to be singled out for criticism. Aki acknowledged the criticism, admitting that a big part of his motivation to move to Ireland was to play international rugby, and noted that he hoped that he could do the country proud with his on-field performance.

=== Ireland career ===
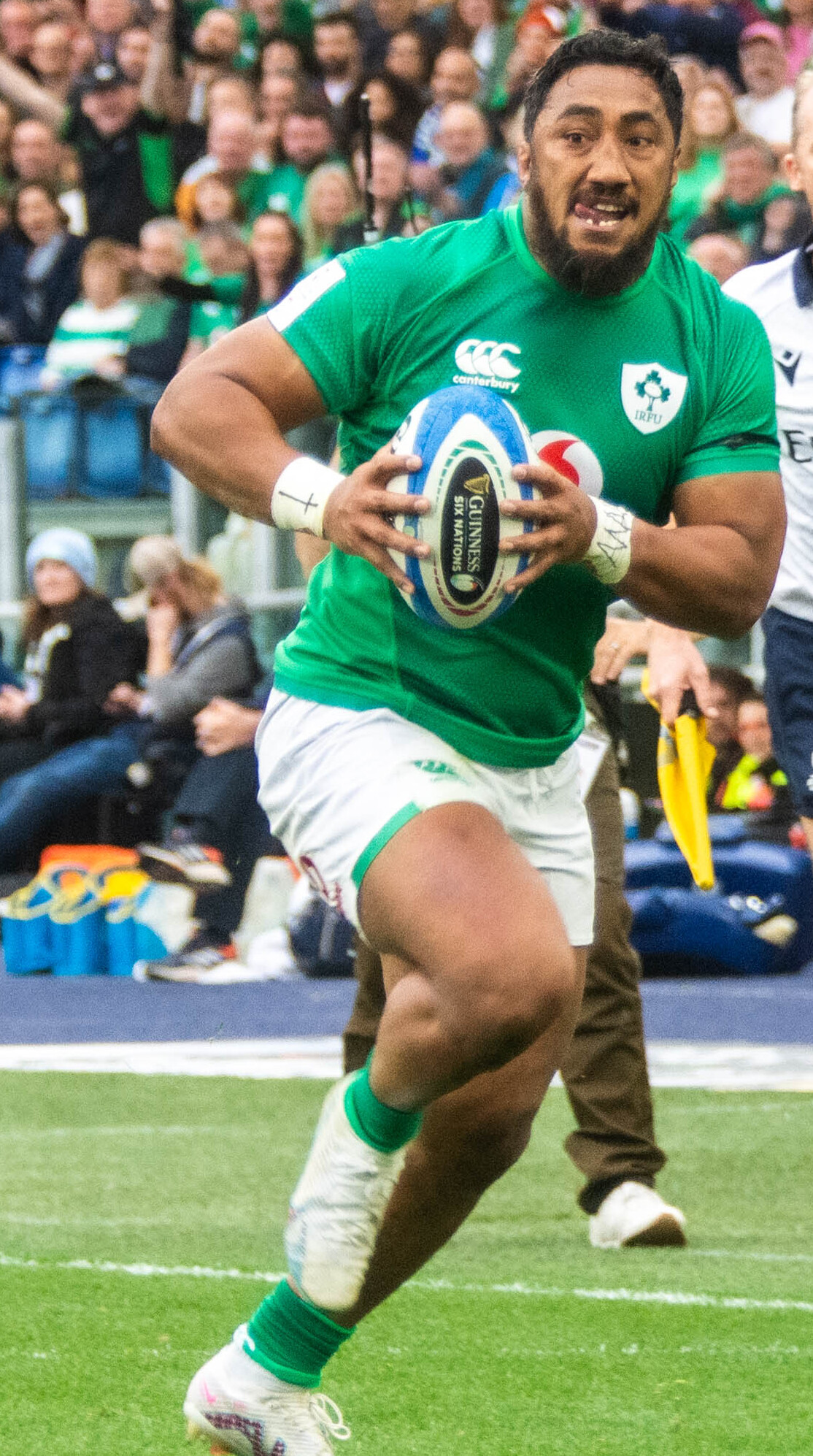
Aki makes a break during 2023 Six Nations match

Aki made his debut for Ireland in the 38–3 win against South Africa at the Aviva Stadium on 11 November 2017, playing the full 80 minutes. Two weeks later he played against Argentina, again featuring for the entire match in a 28–19 win.

In the 2018 Six Nations, Aki was the only centre to feature in every game for Ireland as they won the Grand Slam. Injuries to centre partners Garry Ringrose, Robbie Henshaw and Chris Farrell meant that Aki started every match and was only replaced in the final game against England due to injury. He was also part of the team's end-of season tour of Australia, which saw Ireland win a test series against Australia for the first time since 1979.

Aki continued to be a regular starter for Ireland in the 2018–19 season. On 17 November 2018, he started against his native New Zealand in a 16–9 win. This was Ireland's first victory over the All Blacks on home soil. Aki also featured in all five of Ireland's games in the 2019 Six Nations, as they finished third in a disappointing defence of their Grand Slam title.

In September 2019, Aki was named in the Irish squad for the upcoming World Cup in Japan. He started Ireland's opening game against Scotland, but was removed after only 20 minutes in the 27–3 win due to a head injury. This injury caused him to miss the next game against hosts Japan, which ended in a shock 19–12 defeat to leave Ireland in danger of elimination. Aki returned to the starting lineup for the following game against Russia, and also started the final pool match against over Samoa but was sent off in the 29th minute of the 47–5 win. The red card resulted in a three-game suspension, ruling Aki out of the remainder of the tournament. Ireland were eliminated in the next round, as New Zealand ran out 46–14 victors in the quarter-finals.

Aki was banned for four games after receiving a red card for a high tackle on Billy Vunipola in Ireland's 32–18 win against England in the 2021 Six Nations Championship on 20 March.

He was called up to be part of the Irish squad for the 2023 Six Nations, which Ireland went on to win their fourth Grand Slam. In August 2023, he was selected to be in Ireland's World Cup squad ahead of the 2023 World Cup in France. Throughout the tournament he equalled the record for the most tries scored by an individual player for Ireland in a single world cup campaign, equalling the record set by Keith Earls with a total of five which he achieved at the 2011 tournament. He was one of four players nominated for Player of the Tournament following the completion of the World Cup. In January 2024, Aki was named the Guinness Rugby Writers of Ireland Men's Players of The Year.

The Ireland squad for the 2024 Six Nations were announced in January, with Bundee being included. He received significant praise from the Evening Standard for his performances against Wales in a 31–7 victory for Ireland on 24 February. In November 2024, having lost his place in the side for a fixture against Argentina to Robbie Henshaw, he returned to the side for Ireland's 2024 Autumn Nation Series fixture against Fiji. He went on to score a try and win player-of-the-match as Ireland won 52–17.

In February 2025, he scored a try in the opening round of the 2025 Six Nations in a 27–22 win against England.

Initially named in the 2026 Six Nations squad for Ireland, Aki was dropped from the squad after a misconduct complaint relating to his behaviour towards referee Eoghan Cross at a provincial match against Leinster on 24 January. He was given a four game ban and as a consequence, missed the first three games of the 2026 Six Nations.

=== British & Irish Lions ===
On 6 May 2021, Aki was named in the squad for the 2021 British & Irish Lions tour to South Africa. He made his test debut on 7 August 2021 in the final test. South Africa won the final test 19–16 and the series by two games to one. He was selected for the 2025 British & Irish Lions tour to Australia and played a warm-up match before the tour at the Aviva Stadium in Dublin against Argentina, scoring the first try. However, the Lions ended up losing the game.

== Personal life ==
Aki grew up and went to school with former Chiefs teammate Tim Nanai-Williams.

Aki has five children and frequently highlights the importance his family has to him. Aki lives in Oranmore, a suburb of Galway city.

On 16 September 2024, Aki was granted Irish citizenship; he maintains dual citizenship.

== Career statistics ==
=== List of international tries ===
Number	Position	Points	Tries	Result	Opposition	Venue	Date	Ref.
1	Centre	5	1	Won	Italy	Aviva Stadium	10 February 2018	
2	Centre	5	1	Won	Wales	Aviva Stadium	24 February 2018	
3	Centre	5	1	Won	Argentina	Aviva Stadium	10 November 2018	
4	Centre	5	1	Lost	England	Twickenham Stadium	24 August 2019	
5	Centre	5	1	Won	Italy	Aviva Stadium	24 October 2020	
6	Centre	5	1	Won	Japan	Aviva Stadium	6 November 2021	
7	Centre	5	1	Won	Wales	Aviva Stadium	5 February 2022	
8	Centre	5	1	Lost	New Zealand	Eden Park	2 July 2022	
9	Centre	5	1	Won	Australia	Aviva Stadium	19 November 2022	
10	Centre	5	1	Won	Italy	Stadio Olimpico	25 February 2023	
11	Centre	5	1	Won	England	Aviva Stadium	19 August 2023	
12–13	Centre	10	2	Won	Romania	Nouveau Stade de Bordeaux	9 September 2023	
14–15	Centre	10	2	Won	Tonga	Stade de la Beaujoire	16 September 2023	
16	Centre	5	1	Lost	New Zealand	Stade de France	14 October 2023	
17	Centre	5	1	Won	Fiji	Aviva Stadium	23 November 2024	
18	Centre	5	1	Won	England	Aviva Stadium	1 February 2025	

as of 1 February 2025

== Honours ==
Chiefs

- 1× Super Rugby: 2013

Connacht

- 1× Pro12: 2016
- 1× Pro12 Player of the Season: 2016
- 1× Pro12 Dream Team: 2016

Ireland

- 3× Six Nations Championship: 2018, 2023, 2024
- 2× Grand Slam: 2018, 2023
- 5× Triple Crown: 2018, 2022, 2023, 2025, 2026

Individual

- 1× World Rugby Men's 15s Player of the Year Nominee: 2023
- 1x Ireland Men's XVs players’ player of the year: 2024
