= Josh Navidi =

Welsh international rugby union player

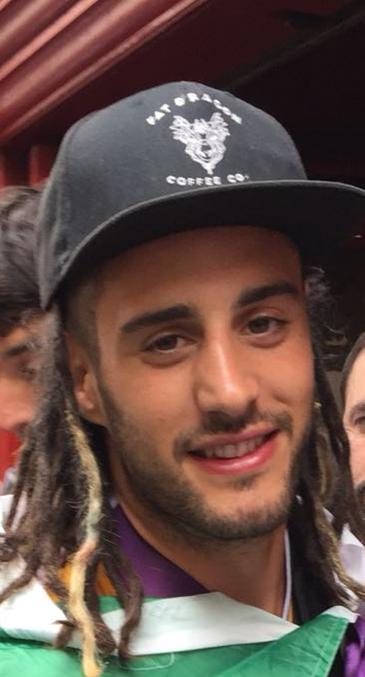
- Full name: Joshua Rajai Navidi
- Born: 13 December 1990 (age 35) Bridgend, Bridgend County Borough, Wales
- Height: 182 cm (6 ft 0 in)
- Weight: 105 kg (231 lb)
- School: St Bede's College, Christchurch; Brynteg School

Rugby union career
- Position(s): Flanker, Number eight
Youth career
- –2006: Bridgend Athletic
- 2007–2008: St Bede's College
Amateur team(s)
Years	Team	Apps	(Points)
2009	Glamorgan Wanderers		
2009–2010	Cardiff RFC		
2010	Cardiff Rugby Academy		
- Correct as of 2010
Senior career
Years	Team	Apps	(Points)
2009–2023	Cardiff Rugby	184	(105)
- Correct as of 21 April 2023
International career
Years	Team	Apps	(Points)
2009–2010	Wales U20	8	(0)
2013–2022	Wales	33	(5)
2021	British & Irish Lions	0	(0)
- Correct as of 16 July 2022

Joshua Rajai Navidi (born 30 December 1990) is a Welsh former international rugby union player who played as a flanker and a number eight. Navidi played for Cardiff Rugby and Wales before he retired, being captain of the national team briefly in 2019, and represented the British and Irish Lions on their 2021 tour of South Africa. He has also previously captained Wales U20.

== Early and personal life ==
Navidi was born in the South Wales town of Bridgend, located in the principal area of the same name, to Iranian father Hedy (Hedayat Rajai Navidi) and Welsh mother Euros (née Wyn Lloyd). Navidi's mother Euros, a hairdresser, hails from Anglesey in the north-west of Wales. His father, Hedy, who is a businessman and former wrestler, hails from Tabriz in the far north-west of Iran which he left at 18-years-old (1979) during the Iranian Revolution. Coming to the United Kingdom, Hedy studied at Bangor University in the north of Wales where Navidi's parents met.

At 16-years-old Navidi moved to Christchurch, New Zealand with his father. While in New Zealand Navidi attended the Catholic boarding school, St Bede's College. Navidi spent two years there and played in the school's third XV in his first season. In his second season with St Bede's, which the school granted Navidi a scholarship for, he started every game for the first team. The team finished third after losing to the prestigious Hamilton Boys' High School in the National First XV Championship competition, the premier rugby competition for secondary schools in New Zealand. After two years in New Zealand Navidi was offered a place in the Canterbury Academy, however Navidi returned to Wales and was given a trial at Cardiff.

== International ==
In January 2013 Navidi was selected in the 35 man Wales squad for the 2013 Six Nations championship.

In May 2013 Navidi was selected in the Wales national rugby union team 32 man training squad for the summer 2013 tour to Japan. He made his international debut against Japan at openside flanker on 15 June 2013.

Navidi was a squad member at the 2019 Rugby World Cup, and played in four matches before a hamstring injury ended his participation in the tournament. He was called up to the British and Irish Lions squad for the 2021 tour to South Africa following the injury to Justin Tipuric.

== Post-rugby career ==
Navidi is learning Welsh. He owns and is the director of Cute Club, a car dealership in Llantwit Major. He is also a DJ.
