= Lukhanyo Am =

South African rugby union player (born 1993)

- Born: 28 November 1993 (age 32) Zwelitsha, South Africa
- Height: 1.86 m (6 ft 1 in)
- Weight: 93 kg (205 lb; 14 st 9 lb)
- School: Hoërskool De Vos Malan

Rugby union career
- Position: Centre / Wing
- Current team: Mitsubishi Dynaboars
Youth career
- 2012: Border Bulldogs
Senior career
Years	Team	Apps	(Points)
2013 2015	Border Bulldogs	20	(5)
2014	Falcons	2	(5)
2016	Southern Kings	10	(5)
2016–2025	Sharks (Currie Cup)	23	(30)
2017–2025	Sharks	114	(115)
2022	→ Kobelco Kobe Steelers	6	(15)
2025–	Mitsubishi Dynaboars	17	(25)
- Correct as of 23 May 2026
International career
Years	Team	Apps	(Points)
2016	South Africa 'A'	2	(0)
2017–	South Africa	42	(35)
- Correct as of 16 November 2024
Medal record
Men's Rugby 15's
Representing South Africa
Rugby World Cup
Gold medal – first place	2019 Japan	Squad
Gold medal – first place	2023 France	Squad

Lukhanyo Am (born 28 November 1993) is a South African professional rugby union player who plays for the Mitsubishi Sagamihara DynaBoars as a centre. Am previously played for the Sharks, and has represented the South Africa national rugby union team.

== Professional career ==
Am played for the Margate-based SKZN Rugby Academy before he was called into the Border Bulldogs Under-19 squad that won the 2012 Under-19 Provincial Championship Division B and winning promotion to Division A, making six appearances and scoring three tries.

After spending time with Saracens during the off-season as part of an exchange programme in conjunction with the British High Commission, he returned to be included in the Border Bulldogs senior squad for the 2013 Vodacom Cup competition and made his senior debut against defending champions Western Province in Paarl.

=== Southern Kings ===
At the start of 2016, Am was one of two Sharks players that joined the Southern Kings' Super Rugby squad for a trial period as they prepared for the 2016 Super Rugby season.

=== Sharks ===
After a successful spell at Southern Kings there were high expectations that Am had to meet. He did not disappoint and played a crucial part for the Sharks, helping them reach the quarter finals of the 2017, 2018 and 2019 Super Rugby seasons. In January 2020, Am was named captain of the Sharks for the 2020 Super Rugby season, replacing the retiring Tendai Mtawarira. Am departed the Sharks on 5 November 2025 for Mitsubishi Sagamihara DynaBoars.

== International career ==
In 2013, Am was named in a South African Barbarians team to face Saracens in London.

=== South Africa 'A' ===
South Africa 'A' 2016

In 2016, Am was included in a South Africa 'A' squad that played a two-match series against a touring England Saxons team. He came on as a replacement in their first match in Bloemfontein, but ended on the losing side as the visitors ran out 32–24 winners. He was promoted to the starting line-up for the second match of the series, a 26–29 defeat to the Saxons in George.

South Africa 'A' 2021

Am was named as Captain of South Africa 'A' for the warm-up game against the British and Irish Lions on July 14, 2021. He proudly led the South African team to a win against the visitors. Lukhanyo scored one of the two converted tries in the exhibition match.

=== South Africa ===
Am was included in the South African squad for the 2017 end-of-year rugby union internationals.

He has had a prolific impact on the backline of the Springboks, partnering well with Damian De Allende and causing havoc for opposition teams. He was very instrumental in the lead up games to the 2019 Rugby Championship campaign. Am was part of the Springboks team that lifted the coveted 2019 Rugby Championship trophy. He has also been named on several games the vice-captain to Siya Kolisi, as further proof of his instrumental impact on the team.

2019 Rugby World Cup in Japan

Am was named in South Africa's squad for the 2019 Rugby World Cup. South Africa won the tournament, defeating England 32-12 in the final. During the final, Am assisted Makazole Mapimpi's try, which was South Africa's first try in a Rugby World Cup final. Am played in six of the team's seven matches during the tournament.

The British and Irish Lions Tour 2021

Am played all the games against the visiting British and Irish Lions, having successfully led South Africa 'A' as captain in the warmup match. The Springboks eventually won the series and this was a further crowning of Am and his centre partner Damian De Allende, when they were applauded for their escapades and well regarded as the best center pairing in World Rugby.

2023 Rugby World Cup in France

Although Am did not initially make South Africa's 2023 Rugby World Cup squad due to injury suffered in the last game against the Argentinian team, he was later called up to the campaign in France for the injured Makazole Mapimpi.

== Honours ==
South Africa

- 2019 Rugby Championship Winner.
- 2019 Rugby World Cup Japan Winner.
- 2021 South Africa 'A' vs British & Irish Lions tour to South Africa appointed Captain.
- 2021 South Africa 'A' vs British & Irish Lions tour to South Africa Winner.
- 2021 British & Irish Lions tour to South Africa Winner.
- 2023 Rugby World Cup France Winner.
- 2024 Qatar Airways Cup in Twickenham - Springboks vs Wales Winner.
- 2024 Nelson Mandela Plate - Springboks vs Wallabies Winner.
- 2024 Freedom Cup - Springboks vs All Blacks Winner.
- 2024 Rugby Championship Winner.

Sharks

- 2023–24 EPCR Challenge Cup Winner
- 2024 Currie Cup Championship Winner

=== Test Match Record ===
As of 25 May 2025

Against	P	W	D	L	Tri	Pts	%Won
Argentina	8	6	0	2	1	5	75
Australia	5	2	0	3	1	5	40
England	5	4	0	1	0	0	80
British & Irish Lions	3	2	0	1	1	5	66.67
Italy	1	1	0	0	1	5	100
Japan	2	2	0	0	0	0	100
Namibia	1	1	0	0	1	5	100
New Zealand	9	4	1	4	1	5	44.44
Portugal	1	1	0	0	1	5	100
Scotland	2	2	0	0	0	0	100
Wales	5	4	0	1	0	0	80
Total	42	29	1	12	7	35	69.05

P = Games Played, W = Games Won, D = Games Drawn, L = Games Lost, Tri = Tries Scored, Pts = Points Scored

=== International tries ===
As of 25 May 2025

Try	Opposing team	Location	Venue	Competition	Date	Result	Score
1	Argentina	Durban, South Africa	Kings Park Stadium	2018 Rugby Championship	18 August 2018	Win	34–21
2	Namibia	Aichi, Japan	Toyota Stadium	2019 Rugby World Cup	28 September 2019	Win	57–3
3	Italy	Fukuroi, Japan	Shizuoka Stadium	2019 Rugby World Cup	4 October 2019	Win	49–3
4	British & Irish Lions	Cape Town, South Africa	Cape Town Stadium	2021 British & Irish Lions Tour to South Africa	31 July 2021	Win	27–9
5	Australia	Brisbane, Australia	Lang Park	2021 Rugby Championship	18 September 2021	Loss	30–17
6	New Zealand	Johannesburg, South Africa	Ellis Park Stadium	2022 Rugby Championship	13 August 2022	Loss	23–35
7	Portugal	Bloemfontein, South Africa	Free State Stadium	2024 mid-year tests	20 July 2024	Win	64–21
