= Hamish Watson (rugby union) =

British Lions & Scotland international rugby union player

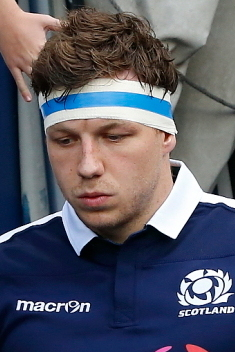
- Watson representing Scotland during the Summer Internationals
- Full name: Hamish Fergus Wallace Watson
- Born: 15 October 1991 (age 35) Manchester, England
- Height: 1.80 m (5 ft 11 in)
- Weight: 102 kg (225 lb; 16 st 1 lb)
- School: Oakham School

Rugby union career
- Position: Flanker
- Current team: Leicester Tigers
Senior career
Years	Team	Apps	(Points)
2011–2026	Edinburgh Rugby	159	(100)
2026	→Leicester Tigers (loan)	6	(0)
2026–	Castres		
- Correct as of 7 June 2026
International career
Years	Team	Apps	(Points)
2011	Scotland U20	10	(0)
2015–	Scotland	59	(40)
2021	British & Irish Lions	1	(0)
- Correct as of 30 September 2023
National sevens team
Years	Team		Comps
2011–2012	Scotland		4
- Correct as of 18 March 2023

Hamish Fergus Wallace Watson (born 15 October 1991) is a professional rugby union player who plays as a flanker for Top 14 side Castres Olympique. Between 2011 and 2026 he played 159 games for Edinburgh Rugby.

== Early life ==
He first played rugby at Terra Nova school, followed by a successful career at Wilmslow rugby club in the junior section. He then moved to Oakham School and played for Leicester Tigers Academy until the age of 18.

== Club career ==
At the start of his English professional career he moved to Oakham in Rutland and was at the Leicester Tigers Academy. On moving to Scotland he then played for Edinburgh Rugby. In March 2026 Watson returned to Leicester Tigers on an initial two month loan from parent club Edinburgh. On the 22nd March he made his first team debut 16 years after leaving the club playing the full game of Leicester’s 33-19 victory against Bristol Bears in the Premiership.

== International career ==
Although he was born and raised in England, Watson was eligible to represent Scotland due to his grandfather, who was born in Glasgow.

He progressed to a centrally held Scotland 7s contract in the summer of 2011 before being approached to join the Edinburgh Rugby elite development programme.

He made his Scotland Club XV debut in 2013 while at Edinburgh Academicals.

=== Scotland ===
After impressing for Edinburgh Rugby, Watson made his international debut in the home defeat to Italy during the 2015 Six Nations Championship. His first international try came during the Autumn Internationals of November 2016 as Scotland beat Georgia with his second coming the following summer in a victory over Australia in Sydney.

Watson was selected in Scotland's squad for the Rugby World Cup in 2019, but suffered a tournament-ending injury in the opening match against Ireland. Watson's form in the 2021 Six Nations Championship, in which he didn't miss a single tackle during the five matches, saw him win Player of the Championship.

In 2023 Watson was selected in Scotland's 33-player squad for the 2023 Rugby World Cup in France.

=== British & Irish Lions ===
Watson was selected in the 37-man squad for the British & Irish Lions 2021 tour to South Africa. He played in the first tour match against the Sigma Lions at Ellis Park Stadium in Johannesburg, becoming Lion #847. He scored a try within seven minutes and was named man of the match. After performing well in the tour's warm-up matches, he was selected on the substitutes' bench for the first Test, coming on early in the second half as the Lions won 22-17 to lead the series.

== Career statistics ==
=== International analysis by opposition ===
Opposition	Played	Win	Loss	Draw	Tries	Points	Win %
Argentina	4	3	1	0	1	5	.750
Australia	5	3	2	0	2	10	.600
England	6	3	2	1	0	0	.583
Fiji	2	1	1	0	0	0	.500
France	7	5	2	0	0	0	.714
Georgia	3	3	0	0	2	10	1.000
Ireland	7	1	6	0	1	5	.143
Italy	9	8	1	0	0	0	.889
Japan	1	1	0	0	0	0	1.000
New Zealand	2	0	2	0	0	0	.000
Romania	1	1	0	0	1	0	1.000
Samoa	1	1	0	0	0	0	1.000
South Africa (Note: Includes of one British & Irish Lions test appearance in the 2021 tour to South Africa.)	3	1	2	0	1	5	.333
Tonga	1	1	0	0	0	0	1.000
Wales	7	2	5	0	0	0	.286
Career	59	33	24	1	8	35	.578

as of 1 October 2023

== Personal life ==
Watson has gained two nicknames from fans: "The Mish", a shortening of his given name, and "Pinball", in reference to his unique running style which sees him bounce off several players over a short distance whilst carrying the ball. The nickname "Pinball" was given to Watson by the Scottish Rugby Podcast.
